= 2014–15 FC Desna Chernihiv season =

FC Desna Chernihiv
2014–15 season
- President: Oleksiy Chebotaryov
- Manager: Oleksandr Ryabokon
- Stadium: Chernihiv Stadium
- Ukrainian First League: 5th
- Ukrainian Cup: Round of 32 (1/16)
- Top goalscorer: League: Yehor Kartushov (8); All: Yehor Kartushov (8)
Home colours	Away colours

For the 2014–15 season, FC Desna Chernihiv competed in the Ukrainian First League.

== Players ==
=== Squad information ===
As of 31 May 2019

Squad no.	Name	Nationality	Position	Date of birth (age)
Goalkeepers
28	Maksym Tatarenko ^{List B}	(Ukraine)	GK	7 March 1999 (aged 20)
	Kostyantyn Makhnovskyi	(Ukraine)	GK	1 January 1989 (aged 30)
	Oleh Shevchenko	(Ukraine)	GK	5 June 1988 (aged 30)
Defenders
3	Temur Partsvania	(Ukraine) (Georgia (country))	DF	6 July 1991 (aged 27)
17	Andriy Hitchenko	(Ukraine)	DF	2 October 1984 (aged 34)
21	Serhiy Lyulka	(Ukraine)	DF	22 February 1990 (aged 29)
23	Dmytro Nyemchaninov	(Ukraine)	DF	27 January 1990 (aged 29)
32	Maksym Imerekov	(Ukraine)	DF	23 January 1991 (aged 28)
33	Andriy Slinkin	(Ukraine)	DF	19 February 1991 (aged 28)
45	Denys Favorov (Captain)	(Ukraine)	DF	1 April 1991 (aged 28)
Midfielders
7	Vladyslav Ohirya	(Ukraine)	MF	3 April 1990 (aged 29)
12	Yehor Kartushov	(Ukraine)	MF	5 January 1991 (aged 28)
14	Andriy Yakymiv ^{List B}	(Ukraine)	MF	15 June 1997 (aged 21)
15	Renat Mochulyak ^{List B}	(Ukraine)	MF	15 February 1998 (aged 21)
16	Yevheniy Belych ^{List B}	(Ukraine)	MF	9 January 2001 (aged 18)
18	Mykhaylo Kozak	(Ukraine)	MF	20 January 1991 (aged 28)
19	Artem Favorov	(Ukraine)	MF	19 March 1994 (aged 25)
22	Andriy Mostovyi	(Ukraine)	MF	24 January 1988 (aged 31)
27	Serhiy Starenkyi	(Ukraine)	MF	20 September 1984 (aged 34)
79	Mykhaylo Serhiychuk	(Ukraine)	MF	29 July 1991 (aged 27)
89	Oleksandr Volkov	(Ukraine)	MF	7 February 1989 (aged 30)
90	Andriy Bohdanov	(Ukraine)	MF	21 January 1990 (aged 29)
Forwards
9	Dmytro Khlyobas	(Ukraine)	FW	9 May 1994 (aged 25)
10	Oleksandr Filippov	(Ukraine)	FW	23 October 1992 (aged 26)
20	Denys Bezborodko (on loan from Shakhtar Donetsk)	(Ukraine)	FW	31 May 1994 (aged 25)

== Transfers ==
=== In ===
Date	Pos.	Player	Age	Moving from	Type	Fee	Source
Summer
15 July 2014	GK	(Ukraine) Serhiy Sitalo	38	(Ukraine) Tavriya Simferopol	Transfer	Free	
28 August 2014	MF	(Ukraine) Yaroslav Serdyuk	38	(Ukraine) Zhemchuzhina Yalta	Transfer	Free	

=== Out ===
Date	Pos.	Player	Age	Moving to	Type	Fee	Source
Summer
20 June 2014	MF	(Ukraine) Roman Machulenko	24	(Poland) OKS Stomil Olsztyn	Transfer	Free	
20 June 2014	MF	(Georgia (country)) Levan Gulordava	24	(Georgia (country)) Zugdidi	Transfer	Free	
20 June 2014	FW	(Ukraine) Yevhen Chepurnenko	24	(Ukraine) Oleksandriya	Transfer	Free	
20 June 2014	DF	(Ukraine) Ilya Seryi	25	(Ukraine) Polesie »Dobryanka	Transfer	Free	
Winter
22 January 2015	GK	(Ukraine) Andriy Fedorenko	24	(Sweden) IF Älgarna	Transfer	Free	

== Statistics ==
=== Appearances and goals ===
No.	Pos	Nat	Player	Total		Premier League		Cup	
No.	Pos	Nat	Player	Apps	Goals	Apps	Goals	Apps	Goals
Goalkeepers
	GK	(Ukraine) UKR	Oleh Shevchenko	2	0	2	0	0	0
	GK	(Ukraine) UKR	Andriy Fedorenko	6	0	6	0	0	0
	GK	(Ukraine) UKR	Serhiy Sitalo	22	0	22	0	0	0
Defenders
	DF	(Ukraine) UKR	Oleh Leonidov	5	0	5	0	0	0
	DF	(Ukraine) UKR	Yevhen Yeliseyev	9	2	9	2	0	0
	DF	(Ukraine) UKR	Volodymyr Chulanov	22	1	22	1	0	0
	DF	(Ukraine) UKR	Yarema Kavatsiv	26	3	26	3	0	0
	DF	(Ukraine) UKR	Vadym Melnyk	28	4	28	4	0	0
	DF	(Ukraine) UKR	Rudolf Sukhomlynov	20	0	20	0	0	0
	DF	(Ukraine) UKR	Vadym Malyuk	2	0	2	0	0	0
Midfielders
	MF	(Ukraine) UKR	Vadym Voronchenko	12	0	12	0	0	0
	MF	(Ukraine) UKR	Pavlo Shchedrakov	25	0	25	0	0	0
	MF	(Ukraine) UKR	Anton Kramar	9	2	9	2	0	0
	MF	(Ukraine) UKR	Vadym Zhuk	26	1	26	1	0	0
	MF	(Ukraine) UKR	Vadym Bovtruk	29	0	29	0	0	0
	MF	(Ukraine) UKR	Andriy Smalko	16	0	16	0	0	0
	MF	(Ukraine) UKR	Denys Skepskyi	12	3	12	3	0	0
Forwards
	FW	(Ukraine) UKR	Ruslan Kisil	12	1	12	1	0	0
	FW	(Ukraine) UKR	Oleksandr Derebchynskyi	25	5	25	5	0	0
	FW	(Ukraine) UKR	Yuriy Furta	16	2	16	2	0	0
	FW	(Ukraine) UKR	Petro Kondratyuk	27	7	27	7	0	0
	FW	(Ukraine) UKR	Mykhaylo Kozak	18	3	18	3	0	0
	FW	(Ukraine) UKR	Ihor Tymchenko	6	0	6	0	0	0
	FW	(Ukraine) UKR	Yehor Kartushov	29	8	29	8	0	0
Players transferred out during the season
	GK	(Ukraine) UKR	Andriy Fedorenko	6	0	6	0	0	0

Source: Competitions

Last updated: 31 May 2019

=== Goalscorers ===
Rank	No.	Pos	Nat	Name	Premier League	Cup	Europa League	Total
1		FW	(Ukraine)	Yehor Kartushov	8	0	0	8
2		FW	(Ukraine)	Petro Kondratyuk	7	0	0	7
3		FW	(Ukraine)	Oleksandr Derebchynskyi	5	0	0	5
4		DF	(Ukraine)	Vadym Melnyk	4	0	0	4
5
5		DF	(Ukraine)	Yarema Kavatsiv	3	0	0	3
5		MF	(Ukraine)	Denys Skepskyi	3	0	0	3
5		FW	(Ukraine)	Mykhaylo Kozak	3	0	0	3
6
6		MF	(Ukraine)	Anton Kramar	2	0	0	2
6		FW	(Ukraine)	Yuriy Furta	2	0	0	2
7
7		DF	(Ukraine)	Volodymyr Chulanov	1	0	0	1
7		MF	(Ukraine)	Vadym Zhuk	1	0	0	1
7		FW	(Ukraine)	Ruslan Kisil	1	0	0	1
				Total	40	0	0	40

Last updated: 31 May 2019
