= 2015–16 FC Desna Chernihiv season =

FC Desna Chernihiv
2015–16 season
- President: Oleksiy Chebotaryov
- Manager: Oleksandr Ryabokon
- Stadium: Chernihiv Stadium
- Ukrainian First League: 8th
- Ukrainian Cup: Round of 32 (1/16)
- Top goalscorer: League: Yevhen Chepurnenko (11); All: Yevhen Chepurnenko (11)
Home colours	Away colours

For the 2015–16 season the club competed in the Ukrainian First League and the Ukrainian Cup.

== Players ==
=== Squad information ===
As of 31 May 2019

Squad no.	Name	Nationality	Position	Date of birth (age)
Goalkeepers
	Kostyantyn Makhnovskyi	(Ukraine)	GK	1 January 1989 (aged 30)
	Oleh Shevchenko	(Ukraine)	GK	5 June 1988 (aged 30)
Defenders
3	Temur Partsvania	(Ukraine) (Georgia (country))	DF	6 July 1991 (aged 27)
17	Andriy Hitchenko	(Ukraine)	DF	2 October 1984 (aged 34)
21	Serhiy Lyulka	(Ukraine)	DF	22 February 1990 (aged 29)
23	Dmytro Nyemchaninov	(Ukraine)	DF	27 January 1990 (aged 29)
32	Maksym Imerekov	(Ukraine)	DF	23 January 1991 (aged 28)
33	Andriy Slinkin	(Ukraine)	DF	19 February 1991 (aged 28)
45	Denys Favorov (Captain)	(Ukraine)	DF	1 April 1991 (aged 28)
Midfielders
7	Vladyslav Ohirya	(Ukraine)	MF	3 April 1990 (aged 29)
12	Yehor Kartushov	(Ukraine)	MF	5 January 1991 (aged 28)
14	Andriy Yakymiv ^{List B}	(Ukraine)	MF	15 June 1997 (aged 21)
15	Renat Mochulyak ^{List B}	(Ukraine)	MF	15 February 1998 (aged 21)
16	Yevheniy Belych ^{List B}	(Ukraine)	MF	9 January 2001 (aged 18)
18	Mykhaylo Kozak	(Ukraine)	MF	20 January 1991 (aged 28)
19	Artem Favorov	(Ukraine)	MF	19 March 1994 (aged 25)
22	Andriy Mostovyi	(Ukraine)	MF	24 January 1988 (aged 31)
27	Serhiy Starenkyi	(Ukraine)	MF	20 September 1984 (aged 34)
79	Mykhaylo Serhiychuk	(Ukraine)	MF	29 July 1991 (aged 27)
89	Oleksandr Volkov	(Ukraine)	MF	7 February 1989 (aged 30)
90	Andriy Bohdanov	(Ukraine)	MF	21 January 1990 (aged 29)
Forwards
9	Dmytro Khlyobas	(Ukraine)	FW	9 May 1994 (aged 25)
10	Oleksandr Filippov	(Ukraine)	FW	23 October 1992 (aged 26)
20	Denys Bezborodko (on loan from Shakhtar Donetsk)	(Ukraine)	FW	31 May 1994 (aged 25)

== Transfers ==
=== In ===
Date	Pos.	Player	Age	Moving from	Type	Fee	Source
Summer
15 July 2015	DF	(Ukraine) Oleh Lutsenko	38	(Ukraine) Hirnyk Kryvyi Rih	Transfer	Free	
15 July 2015	DF	(Ukraine) Dmytro Zaderetskyi	38	(Ukraine) Volyn Lutsk	On Loan	Free	
15 July 2015	DF	(Ukraine) Oleksandr Iosha	20	(Ukraine) Shakhtar-3 Donetsk	Transfer	Free	
15 July 2015	MF	(Ukraine) Mykyta Vovchenko	38	(Ukraine) Poltava	Transfer	Free	
15 July 2015	MF	(Ukraine) Artem Gryshchenko	24	(Ukraine) Nyva Ternopil	Transfer	Free	
15 July 2015	FW	(Ukraine) Aderinsola Eseola	38	(Ukraine) Arsenal Kyiv	Transfer	Free	
Winter
9 February 2016	MF	(Ukraine) Maksym Banasevych	24	(Ukraine) Zorya Luhansk	Loan	Free	
25 March 2016	GK	(Ukraine) Bohdan Kohut	24	(Moldova) Zaria Bălți	Transfer	Free	
25 March 2016	DF	(Ukraine) Denys Favorov	24	(Ukraine) Poltava	Transfer	Free	
25 March 2016	DF	(Ukraine) Maksym Leshchenko	24	(Ukraine) Mykolaiv	Transfer	Free	
25 March 2016	MF	(Georgia (country)) Luka Koberidze	24	(Georgia (country)) Guria Lanchkhuti	Transfer	Free	

=== Out ===
Date	Pos.	Player	Age	Moving to	Type	Fee	Source
Summer
20 June 2015	MF	(Ukraine) Mykhaylo Kozak	24	(Ukraine) Oleksandriya	Transfer	Free	
20 June 2015	DF	(Ukraine) Vadym Zhuk	24	(Ukraine) Hirnyk Kryvyi Rih	Transfer	Free	
20 June 2015	DF	(Ukraine) Oleh Leonidov	24	(Ukraine) Kolos Kovalivka	Transfer	Free	
20 June 2015	FW	(Ukraine) Yuriy Furta	24	(Ukraine) Rukh Vynnyky	Transfer	Free	
20 June 2015	DF	(Ukraine) Yarema Kavatsiv	24	(Ukraine) Zirka Kropyvnytskyi	Transfer	Free	
Winter
22 January 2016	MF	(Ukraine) Ruslan Kisil	24	(Ukraine) Mariupol	Transfer	Free	
22 January 2016	DF	(Ukraine) Oleh Lutsenko	38	(Georgia (country)) Gagra	Transfer	Free	
22 January 2016	MF	(Ukraine) Mykyta Vovchenko	38	Unattached	Transfer	Free	
15 July 2016	FW	(Ukraine) Aderinsola Eseola	38	(Ukraine) Arsenal Kyiv	Transfer	Free	
15 July 2016	MF	(Ukraine) Maksym Marusych	22	(Ukraine) Hirnyk-Sport Horishni Plavni	Transfer	Free	

== Statistics ==
=== Appearances and goals ===
No.	Pos	Nat	Player	Total		Premier League		Cup	
No.	Pos	Nat	Player	Apps	Goals	Apps	Goals	Apps	Goals
Goalkeepers
1	GK	(Ukraine) UKR	Oleh Shevchenko	9	0	9	0	0	0
	GK	(Ukraine) UKR	Bohdan Kohut	7	0	7	0	0	0
31	GK	(Ukraine) UKR	Serhiy Sitalo	13	0	13	0	0	0
Defenders
13	DF	(Ukraine) UKR	Yevhen Yeliseyev	16	0	16	0	0	0
	DF	(Ukraine) UKR	Oleh Lutsenko	3	0	3	0	0	0
4	DF	(Ukraine) UKR	Vadym Melnyk	28	0	28	0	0	0
	DF	(Ukraine) UKR	Maksym Maksymenko	11	0	11	0	0	0
5	DF	(Ukraine) UKR	Volodymyr Chulanov	9	0	9	0	0	0
18	DF	(Ukraine) UKR	Rudolf Sukhomlynov	15	0	15	0	0	0
	DF	(Ukraine) UKR	Oleksandr Chornomorets	8	0	8	0	0	0
6	DF	(Ukraine) UKR	Dmytro Zaderetskyi	20	1	20	1	0	0
	DF	(Ukraine) UKR	Oleksandr Iosha	4	0	4	0	0	0
19	DF	(Ukraine) UKR	Vadym Malyuk	5	0	5	0	0	0
	DF	(Ukraine) UKR	Maksym Leshchenko	6	0	6	0	0	0
Midfielders
	MF	(Ukraine) UKR	Mykyta Vovchenko	6	0	6	0	0	0
	MF	(Ukraine) UKR	Denys Favorov	11	3	11	3	0	0
3	MF	(Ukraine) UKR	Pavlo Shchedrakov	25	1	25	1	0	0
	MF	(Ukraine) UKR	Maksym Marusych	3	0	3	0	0	0
21	MF	(Ukraine) UKR	Kostyantyn Kravchenko	8	0	8	0	0	0
	MF	(Georgia (country)) GEO	Luka Koberidze	8	0	8	0	0	0
2	MF	(Ukraine) UKR	Vadym Zhuk	15	0	15	0	0	0
11	MF	(Ukraine) UKR	Vadym Bovtruk	29	1	29	1	0	0
15	MF	(Ukraine) UKR	Artem Gryshchenko	16	1	16	1	0	0
	MF	(Ukraine) UKR	Yaroslav Bykovets	16	0	16	0	0	0
Forwards
10	FW	(Ukraine) UKR	Aderinsola Eseola	15	5	15	5	0	0
77	FW	(Ukraine) UKR	Oleksandr Ivashchenko	9	0	9	0	0	0
9	FW	(Ukraine) UKR	Petro Kondratyuk	0	0	0	0	0	0
7	FW	(Ukraine) UKR	Yevhen Chepurnenko	28	11	28	11	0	0
12	FW	(Ukraine) UKR	Yehor Kartushov	19	4	19	4	0	0
17	FW	(Ukraine) UKR	Ruslan Kisil	15	2	15	2	0	0

Source: Competitions

Last updated: 31 May 2019

=== Goalscorers ===
Rank	No.	Pos	Nat	Name	Premier League	Cup	Europa League	Total
1		FW	(Ukraine)	Yevhen Chepurnenko	11	0	0	11
2		FW	(Ukraine)	Aderinsola Eseola	5	0	0	0
3		FW	(Ukraine)	Yehor Kartushov	4	0	0	4
4		FW	(Ukraine)	Denys Favorov	3	0	0	3
5		FW	(Ukraine)	Ruslan Kisil	2	0	0	2
6		DF	(Ukraine)	Dmytro Zaderetskyi	1	0	0	1
6		MF	(Ukraine)	Pavlo Shchedrakov	1	0	0	1
6		MF	(Ukraine)	Vadym Bovtruk	1	0	0	1
6		MF	(Ukraine)	Artem Gryshchenko	1	0	0	1
				Total	29	0	0	29

Last updated: 31 May 2019
