= 2013–14 FC Desna Chernihiv season =

FC Desna Chernihiv
2014–15 season
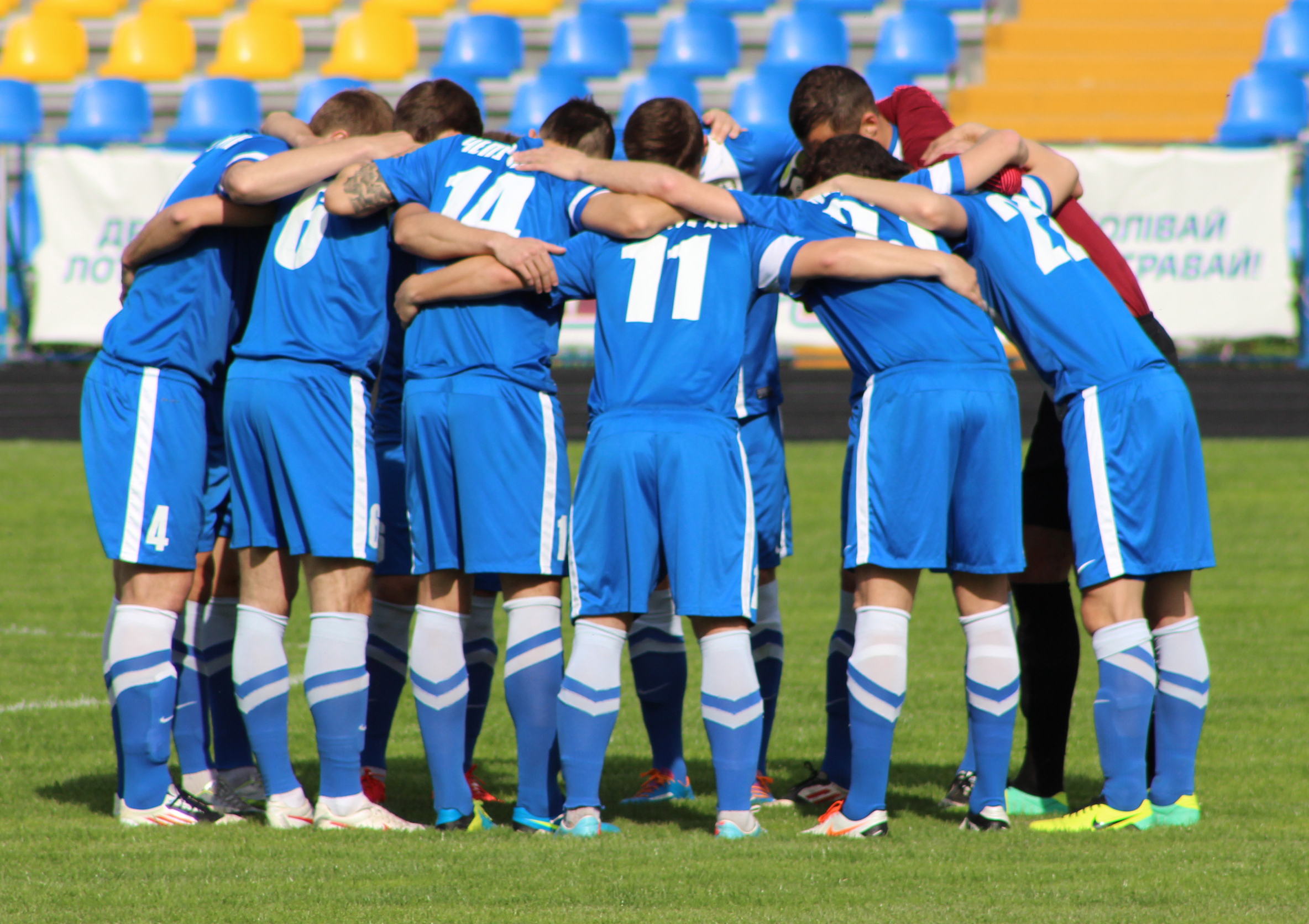
- President: Oleksiy Chebotaryov
- Manager: Oleksandr Ryabokon
- Stadium: Chernihiv Stadium
- Ukrainian First League: 5th
- Ukrainian Cup: Round of 8 (1/4)
- Top goalscorer: League: Yevhen Chepurnenko (7); All: Yevhen Chepurnenko (7)
Home colours	Away colours

For the 2013–14 season, FC Desna Chernihiv competed in the Ukrainian First League.

== Players ==
=== Squad information ===
As of 31 May 2019

Squad no.	Name	Nationality	Position	Date of birth (age)
Goalkeepers
28	Maksym Tatarenko ^{List B}	(Ukraine)	GK	7 March 1999 (aged 20)
	Kostyantyn Makhnovskyi	(Ukraine)	GK	1 January 1989 (aged 30)
	Oleh Shevchenko	(Ukraine)	GK	5 June 1988 (aged 30)
Defenders
3	Temur Partsvania	(Ukraine) (Georgia (country))	DF	6 July 1991 (aged 27)
17	Andriy Hitchenko	(Ukraine)	DF	2 October 1984 (aged 34)
21	Serhiy Lyulka	(Ukraine)	DF	22 February 1990 (aged 29)
23	Dmytro Nyemchaninov	(Ukraine)	DF	27 January 1990 (aged 29)
32	Maksym Imerekov	(Ukraine)	DF	23 January 1991 (aged 28)
33	Andriy Slinkin	(Ukraine)	DF	19 February 1991 (aged 28)
45	Denys Favorov (Captain)	(Ukraine)	DF	1 April 1991 (aged 28)
Midfielders
7	Vladyslav Ohirya	(Ukraine)	MF	3 April 1990 (aged 29)
12	Yehor Kartushov	(Ukraine)	MF	5 January 1991 (aged 28)
14	Andriy Yakymiv ^{List B}	(Ukraine)	MF	15 June 1997 (aged 21)
15	Renat Mochulyak ^{List B}	(Ukraine)	MF	15 February 1998 (aged 21)
16	Yevheniy Belych ^{List B}	(Ukraine)	MF	9 January 2001 (aged 18)
18	Mykhaylo Kozak	(Ukraine)	MF	20 January 1991 (aged 28)
19	Artem Favorov	(Ukraine)	MF	19 March 1994 (aged 25)
22	Andriy Mostovyi	(Ukraine)	MF	24 January 1988 (aged 31)
27	Serhiy Starenkyi	(Ukraine)	MF	20 September 1984 (aged 34)
79	Mykhaylo Serhiychuk	(Ukraine)	MF	29 July 1991 (aged 27)
89	Oleksandr Volkov	(Ukraine)	MF	7 February 1989 (aged 30)
90	Andriy Bohdanov	(Ukraine)	MF	21 January 1990 (aged 29)
Forwards
9	Dmytro Khlyobas	(Ukraine)	FW	9 May 1994 (aged 25)
10	Oleksandr Filippov	(Ukraine)	FW	23 October 1992 (aged 26)
20	Denys Bezborodko (on loan from Shakhtar Donetsk)	(Ukraine)	FW	31 May 1994 (aged 25)

== Transfers ==
=== In ===
Date	Pos.	Player	Age	Moving from	Type	Fee	Source
Summer
15 July 2013	MF	(Ukraine) Mykhaylo Kozak	38	(Ukraine) Stal Alchevsk	Transfer	Free	
15 July 2013	FW	(Ukraine) Pavlo Shchedrakov	38	(Ukraine) UkrAhroKom Holovkivka	Transfer	Free	

=== Out ===
Date	Pos.	Player	Age	Moving to	Type	Fee	Source
Summer
20 June 2013	GK	(Ukraine) Artem Beloshapka	38	(Ukraine) Sumy	Transfer	Free	
20 June 2013	FW	(Ukraine) Dmytro Brovkin	24	(Ukraine) UkrAhroKom Holovkivka	Transfer	Free	
Winter
22 January 2014	DF	(Ukraine) Illya Siryi	25	(Ukraine) Polissie Dibrianka	Transfer	Free	

== Statistics ==
=== Appearances and goals ===
No.	Pos	Nat	Player	Total		Premier League		Cup	
No.	Pos	Nat	Player	Apps	Goals	Apps	Goals	Apps	Goals
Goalkeepers
	GK	(Ukraine) UKR	Oleh Shevchenko	8	0	8	0	0	0
	GK	(Ukraine) UKR	Andriy Fedorenko	23	0	23	0	0	0
Defenders
	DF	(Ukraine) UKR	Anatoliy Burlin	6	0	6	0	0	0
	DF	(Ukraine) UKR	Tymur Rustamov	2	0	2	0	0	0
	DF	(Ukraine) UKR	Vadym Melnyk	30	0	30	0	0	0
	DF	(Ukraine) UKR	Ivan Bilyi	8	1	8	1	0	0
	DF	(Ukraine) UKR	Yarema Kavatsiv	24	2	24	2	0	0
	DF	(Ukraine) UKR	Volodymyr Chulanov	20	1	20	1	0	0
	DF	(Ukraine) UKR	Ilya Seryi	0	0	0	0	0	0
Midfielders
	MF	(Ukraine) UKR	Andriy Smalko	19	0	19	0	0	0
	MF	(Ukraine) UKR	Pavlo Shchedrakov	26	1	26	1	0	0
	MF	(Ukraine) UKR	Vadym Bovtruk	24	2	24	2	0	0
	MF	(Ukraine) UKR	Anton Kramar	10	0	10	0	0	0
	DF	(Ukraine) UKR	Oleksandr Stetsenko	15	0	15	0	0	0
	MF	(Ukraine) UKR	Roman Lutsenko	8	0	8	0	0	0
	MF	(Ukraine) UKR	Vadym Zhuk	18	0	18	0	0	0
Forwards
	FW	(Ukraine) UKR	Dmytro Brovkin	3	0	3	0	0	0
	FW	(Ukraine) UKR	Yevhen Chepurnenko	22	7	22	7	0	0
	FW	(Ukraine) UKR	Petro Kondratyuk	8	2	8	2	0	0
	FW	(Ukraine) UKR	Yuriy Pleshakov	9	2	9	2	0	0
	FW	(Ukraine) UKR	Mykhaylo Kozak	20	1	20	1	0	0
	FW	(Georgia (country)) GEO	Levan Gulordava	8	0	8	0	0	0
	FW	(Ukraine) UKR	Yehor Kartushov	26	6	26	6	0	0
	FW	(Ukraine) UKR	Oleksandr Derebchynskyi	5	1	5	1	0	0
	FW	(Ukraine) UKR	Yuriy Furta	19	4	19	4	0	0
	FW	(Ukraine) UKR	Andriy Kruhlyak	4	0	4	0	0	0

Source: Competitions

Last updated: 31 May 2019

=== Goalscorers ===
Rank	No.	Pos	Nat	Name	Premier League	Cup	Europa League	Total
1		FW	(Ukraine)	Yevhen Chepurnenko	7	0	0	7
2		FW	(Ukraine)	Yehor Kartushov	6	0	0	6
3		FW	(Ukraine)	Yuriy Furta	4	0	0	4
4		DF	(Ukraine)	Yarema Kavatsiv	4	0	0	4
4		MF	(Ukraine)	Vadym Bovtruk	2	0	0	2
4		FW	(Ukraine)	Yuriy Pleshakov	2	0	0	2
5		DF	(Ukraine)	Volodymyr Chulanov	1	0	0	1
5		MF	(Ukraine)	Pavlo Shchedrakov	1	0	0	1
5		FW	(Ukraine)	Mykhaylo Kozak	1	0	0	1
5		FW	(Ukraine)	Oleksandr Derebchynskyi	1	0	0	1
				Total	29	0	0	29

Last updated: 31 May 2019
