= Leonidov =

Leonidov (Russian: Леонидов) is a Russian surname that is derived from the male given name Leonid and literally means Leonid's. It may refer to the following notable people:

- Aleksei Leonidov, a nickname of Leo (Leonid) Feigin, a former BBC Russian Service disk jockey and a founder of Leo Records
- Ivan Leonidov (1902–1959), Soviet architect, urban planner, painter and teacher
- Leonid Leonidov (1873–1941), Russian and Soviet actor and stage director
- Oleh Leonidov (born 1985), Ukrainian football player
