= Viktor Sakhnyuk =

Ukrainian footballer

Personal information
- Full name: Viktor Viktorovych Sakhnyuk
- Date of birth: 4 June 1990 (age 36)
- Place of birth: Kyiv, Ukrainian SSR, Soviet Union
- Height: 1.78 m (5 ft 10 in)
- Position: Forward

Youth career
- 2003–2007: Dynamo Kyiv
- 2007: Dinaz Vyshhorod
- 2008–2009: Ružomberok

Senior career*
Years	Team	Apps	(Gls)
2009–2010	Ružomberok	4	(0)
2009–2010	→ Ružomberok B	11	(0)
2010–2012	Arsenal Kyiv	0	(0)
2012	Dukla Banská Bystrica	11	(1)
2013–2014	Tatran Liptovský Mikuláš	2	(0)
2014	Nyva Ternopil	3	(0)
2015	Enerhiya Nova Kakhovka	11	(2)
2015–2017	Stal Gorzyce		
2017	Erebuni Yerevan	7	(1)
2018	Kobra Kharkiv	2	(0)
2018–2019	Hirnyk Kryvyi Rih	18	(6)
2019	Tavriya Simferopol	11	(2)
2020	Bukovyna Chernivtsi	10	(1)
2021	Dnipro Cherkasy	14	(1)
2021–2022	Trostianets	12	(1)
2022–2023	Rubikon Kyiv	10	(0)
2023	Lokomotyv Kyiv	9	(1)

International career^{‡}
	Ukraine U21	4	(0)
- * Club domestic league appearances and goals as of 20 November 2023 ‡ National team caps and goals as of 2 October 2012

Viktor Viktorovych Sakhnyuk (Ukrainian: Віктор Вікторович Сахнюк; born 4 June 1990) is a Ukrainian professional footballer who plays as a forward.

== Club career ==
=== Dukla Banská Bystrica ===
He made his full professional debut for Dukla Banská Bystrica on 16 September 2012 against Žilina. The match ended in a 2–2 draw.
