= FC Kalynivka =

- Full name: FC Kalynivka
- Founded: 2021
- Ground: Kalynivka Askania Arena
- Chairman: Volodymyr Rudnytskyi
- Manager: Andriy Herasymenko
- League: Kyiv Oblast Champion

Football club Kalynivka (Ukrainian: Футбольний клуб ФК Калинівка) is an amateur Ukrainian football club from the village of Kalynivka, Brovary Raion, Kyiv Oblast. It has played in the Kiev Region Championship and Cup.

== History ==
In 2024, FC Kalynivka returned to regular participation in official competitions in the capital region, as confirmed by the club's president, Volodymyr Rudnytskyi. On 31 May 31, 2025, they won the Kyiv Regional cup by beating FC Dengoff Denikhivka 3-2. In June 2025, the club won the Kyiv Regional Championship by beating Lisne 4-2 on penalties, after regular time had ended 1-1. On 11 August 2026 they beat Chaika Vyshhorod in Ukrainian Cup reaching the Round of 64 (1/32) After this match, the midfielder Yevhen Chepurnenko and the striker =Artem Hryshchenko, thanks to their performances, were included in the symbolic team.

== Players ==
=== Current squad ===
As of 30 September 2026

Note: Flags indicate national team as defined under FIFA eligibility rules; some limited exceptions apply. Players may hold more than one non-FIFA nationality.

No.	Pos.	Nation	Player
1	GK	UKR	Dmytro Ivanov
4	DF	UKR	Oleksandr Kasyanenko
9	MF	UKR	Anatoliy Kuchynskyi
10	FW	UKR	Mykyta Komisar
11	FW	UKR	Vladyslav Alekseyev
15	MF	UKR	Yevgen Bondar
17	FW	UKR	Dmytro Borodenko
20	MF	UKR	Stanislav Rokotyanskyi
22	GK	UKR	Artem Horkovets

No.	Pos.	Nation	Player
23	GK	UKR	Kyrylo Duchev
25	MF	UKR	Andriy Makarenko
27	DF	UKR	Oleksandr Rudenko
29	DF	UKR	Oleksandr Kasyanenko
30	DF	UKR	Ilya Lyashchuk
27	FW	UKR	Artem Hryshchenko
34	GK	UKR	Oleg Mykolaychuk
36	MF	UKR	Yevhen Chepurnenko
55	FW	UKR	Daniil Volskyi

== Personnel ==
Position	Staff
President	(Ukraine) Volodymyr Rudnytskyi
Head coach	(Ukraine) Andriy Herasymenko

== League and cup history ==
Season	Div.	Pos.	Pl.	W	D	L	GS	GA	P	Domestic Cup	Other	Notes
2026–27	regional competitions (Kyiv Oblast)									1/32 finals		

== Honours ==
- Kyiv Oblast Champion
  - Champion: 2024–25
- Kyiv Oblast Cup
  - Champion: 2024–25
