= Dmytro Ivanov =

Ukrainian footballer

Personal information
- Full name: Dmytro Volodymyrovych Ivanov
- Date of birth: 30 September 1989 (age 37)
- Place of birth: Kyiv, Soviet Union
- Height: 1.90 m (6 ft 3 in)
- Position: Goalkeeper

Team information
- Current team: Kalynivka
- Number: 1

Youth career
- 1998–2003: Stal Kyiv
- 2003–2005: Nafkom Brovary

Senior career*
Years	Team	Apps	(Gls)
2005–2009	Nafkom Brovary	55	(0)
2009	Irpin Horenychi	1	(0)
2009–2011	BATE Borisov	0	(0)
2012	Prykarpattya Ivano-Frankivsk	8	(0)
2012–2013	Dinaz Vyshhorod		
2013	Shakhtar Sverdlovsk	3	(0)
2013	Dynamo Khmelnytskyi	15	(0)
2014	Nyva Ternopil	1	(0)
2015–2019	Arsenal Kyiv	37	(0)
2019–2021	Chaika Petropavlivska Borshchahivka	25	(0)
2025	Polissya Stavky	0	(0)
2025–	Kalynivka	0	(0)

International career
2005	Ukraine U16	1	(0)

Managerial career
- 2026: Kudrivka U19 (Goalkeeping Coach)
- 2026–: Kudrivka (Goalkeeping Coach)
- * Club domestic league appearances and goals as of 31 December 2021

Dmytro Ivanov (Ukrainian: Дмитро Володимирович Іванов: born 30 September 1989) is a Ukrainian former footballer who played as a goalkeeper.

== Coaching career ==
In February 2026, he was appointed as Goalkeeping Coach of Kudrivka U19 and in May 2026 he become Goalkeeping Coach of Kudrivka.
