= Oleksandr Shevchenko (footballer) =

Ukrainian footballer

Personal information
- Full name: Oleksandr Hryhorovych Shevchenko
- Date of birth: 24 October 1992 (age 34)
- Place of birth: Kyiv, Ukraine
- Height: 1.95 m (6 ft 5 in)
- Position: Centre-back

Youth career
- 2003–2004: Master-Yunior Kyiv
- 2005: Master-Yunior-2 Kyiv
- 2006–2008: Master-Yunior Kyiv
- 2008–2009: Lokomotyv Kyiv

Senior career*
Years	Team	Apps	(Gls)
2010	Start Kyiv (amateurs)	1	(0)
2013	Bucha (amateurs)		
2014	Avanhard Novohrad-Volynskyi (amateurs)	1	(0)
2015	Lehiya Kyiv (amateurs)	5	(2)
2015–2016	Enerhiya Nova Kakhovka	37	(1)
2017–2018	Arsenal Kyiv	7	(0)
2018–2020	Enerhiya Nova Kakhovka	52	(2)
2021	Tavriya Simferopol	5	(0)
2021	Olimpik Donetsk	4	(0)
2023	Lokomotyv Kyiv	1	(0)
- * Club domestic league appearances and goals as of 1 June 2024

Oleksandr Hryhorovych Shevchenko (Ukrainian: Олександр Григорович Шевченко; born 24 October 1992) is a Ukrainian professional footballer who plays as a centre-back.

== Career ==
Shevchenko isn't a product of the any youth sportive school and joined professional football only in July 2015, when signed a contract with FC Enerhiya Nova Kakhovka in the Ukrainian Second League.
