= Lokomotyv Stadium (Kyiv) =

Association football venue in Kyiv, Ukraine

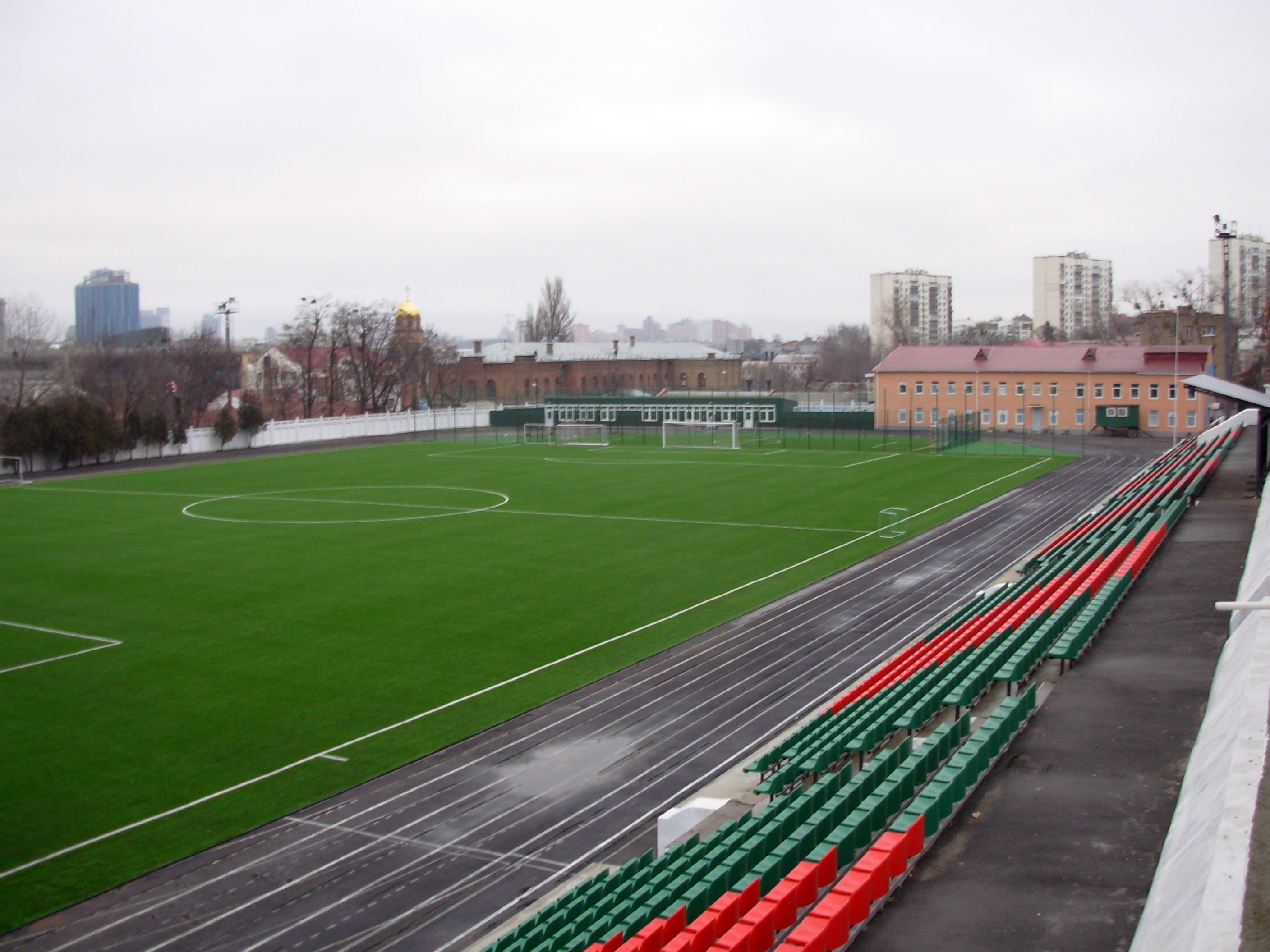
- Interactive map of Lokomotyv Stadium
- Full name: Stadium of the "Lokomotyv" Sports Complex
- Location: 10/2 Stadionnyi Lane, Kyiv, Ukraine
- Coordinates: 50°26′19.8″N 30°28′51.9″E
- Owner: Southwestern Railway
- Capacity: 1,631
- Surface: Artificial turf
- Field size: 104 m × 68 m (114 yd × 74 yd)

Construction
- Opened: 2 August 1925
- Renovated: 1934, 1983, 2012, 2022, 2026

Tenant
- FC Lokomotyv Kyiv

Lokomotyv Stadium (Ukrainian: Стадіон «Локомотив») is a football stadium in Kyiv, Ukraine, and the home ground of FC Lokomotyv Kyiv. Opened on 2 August 1925 on the site of a sports ground for railway station workers, it received its current name in October 1935. The stadium has a capacity of 1,631 spectators, equipped with individual plastic seats. It features an artificial turf pitch and floodlight towers. Behind one of the goals of the main pitch, there is an additional smaller football pitch.

== History ==
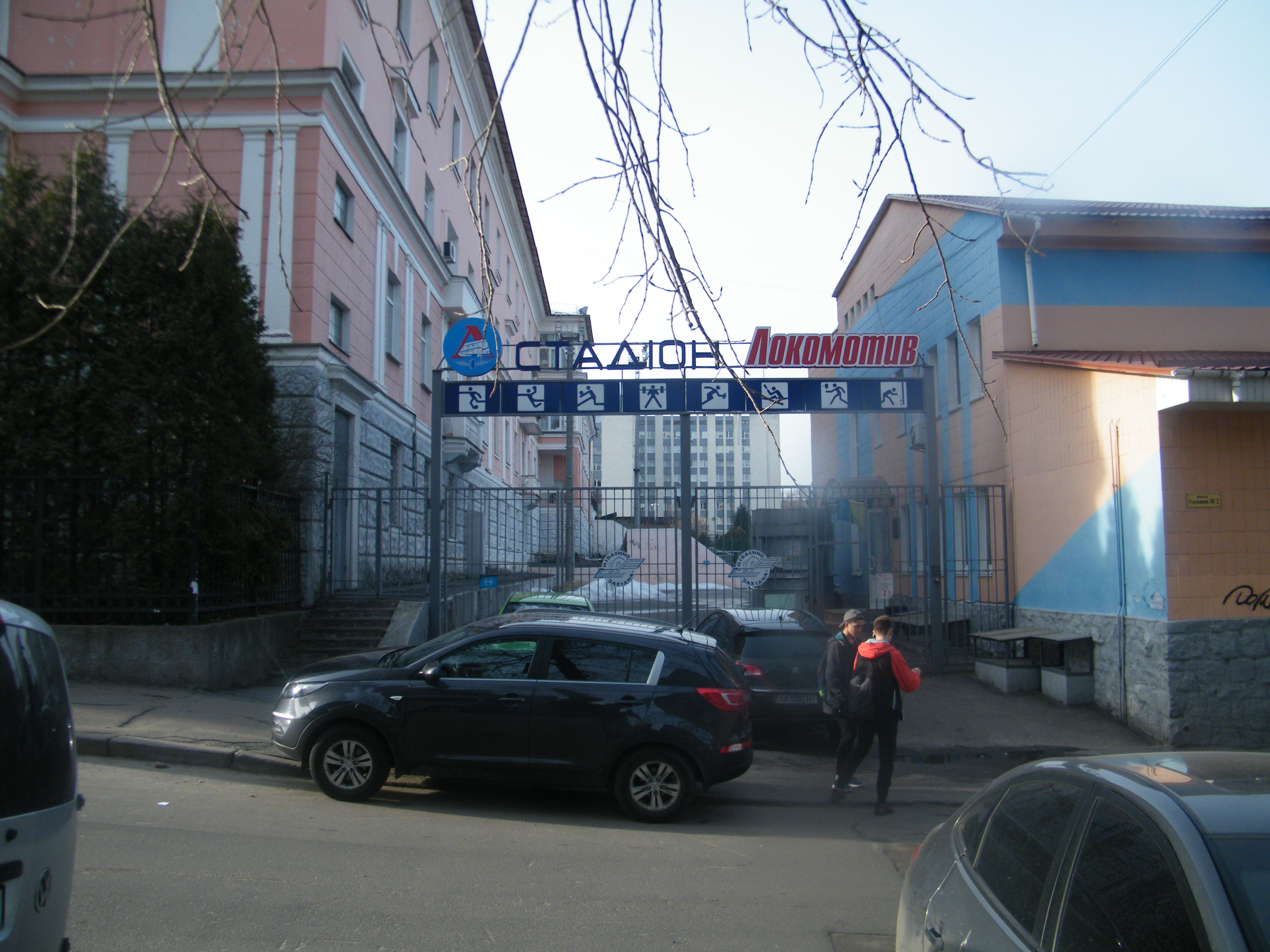
Entrance to the stadium

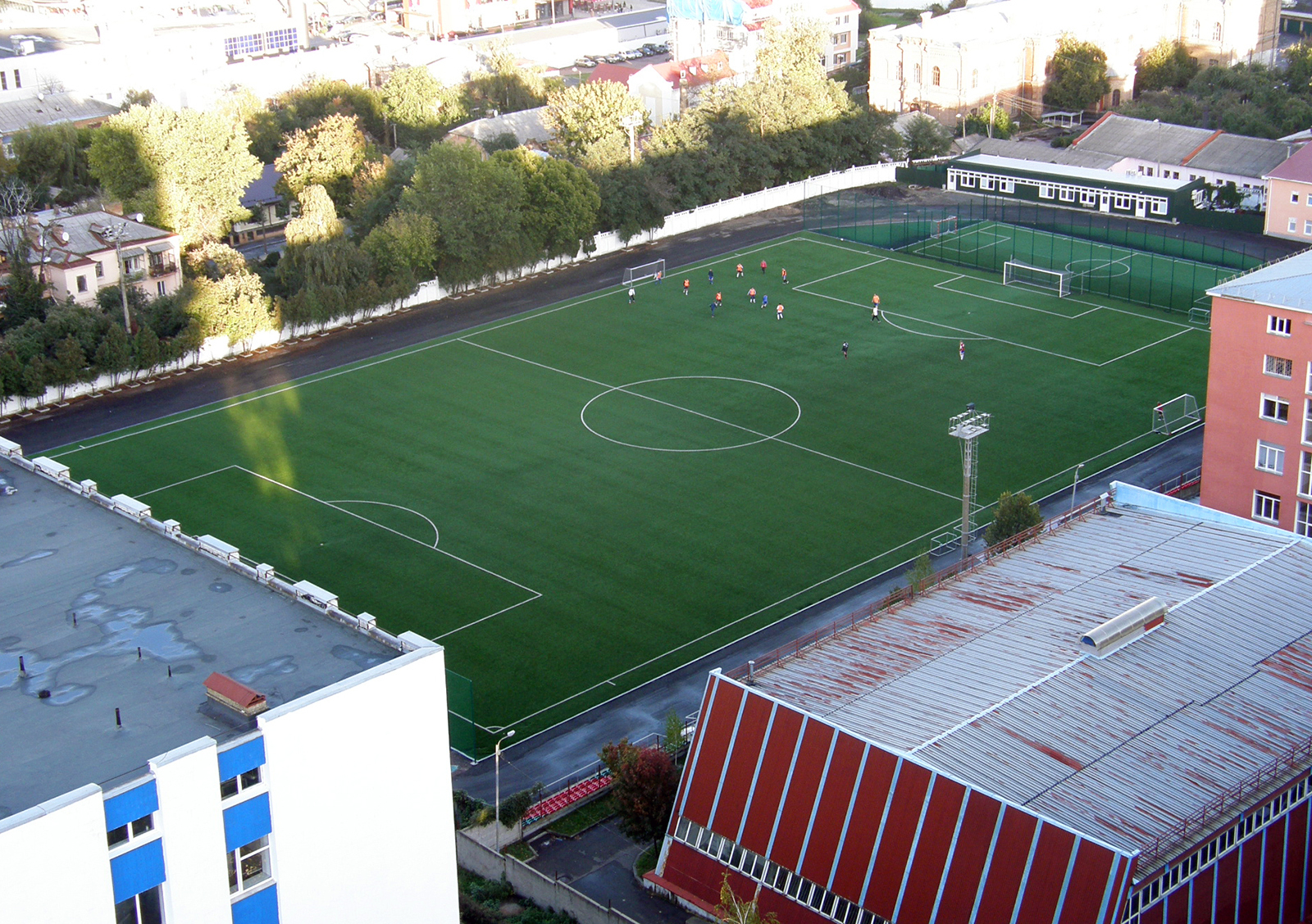
Aerial view of the stadium

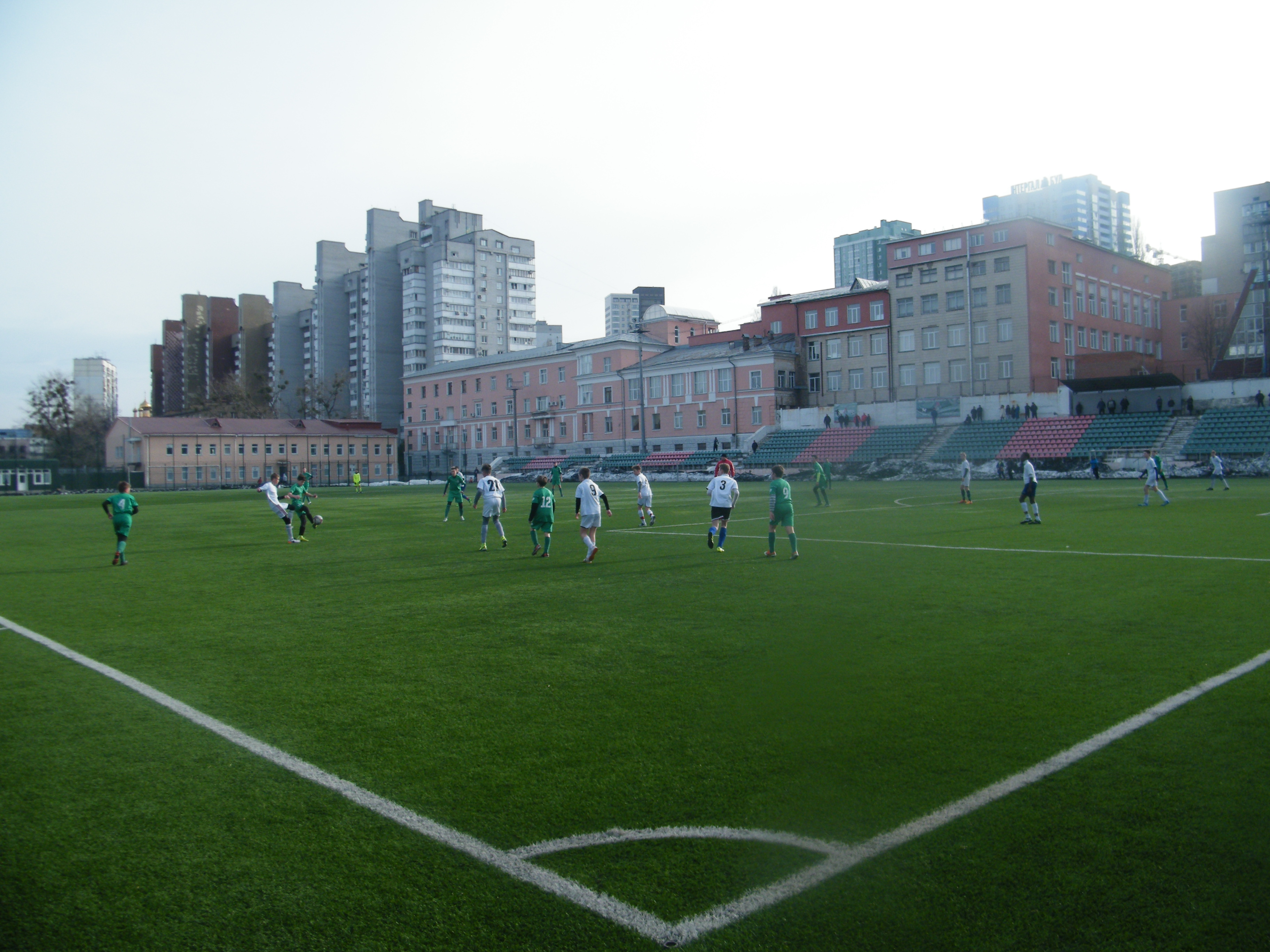
View of the stands

Since 1919, a sports ground for employees of the Kyiv-Pasazhyrskyi railway station existed on the site of the modern Lokomotyv Stadium. On 2 August 1925, a new stadium was officially opened for the "Zheldor" team (now FC Lokomotyv Kyiv), which was one of the strongest in Kyiv at the time. This event was officially reported in the Visnyk fizychnoi kultury newspaper (No. 10, October 1925):

New Railwaymen's Stadium.
On 2 August, on the outskirts of the city's working-class districts, amidst the railway colony, an exemplary stadium for the railwaymen of the Kyiv hub was solemnly opened…

— Visnyk fizychnoi kultury (October 1925)

For nearly two years, the stadium had no official name and was commonly referred to as "Zheldor", until it was officially named the "Red Railway Stadium" in 1927. The arena underwent its first major renovation in 1933–1934, which added stands for 10,000 spectators.

At the end of 1935, at a congress of physical culture athletes of the Southwestern Railway, a decision was made to establish the Lokomotiv Voluntary Sports Society, under which both the football team and the stadium received their new names. In 1938, Lokomotyv hosted matches of the Soviet Top League.

After the team lost its professional status in 1947, the arena primarily hosted Kyiv city championship matches and served as a training base for young footballers at the Lokomotyv Youth Football School.

Floodlights were installed at the stadium in 1983.

At the beginning of the 21st century, the stadium was on the verge of disappearing, with plans to build an upscale fitness center in its place. However, in 2011–2012, a renovation was completed, during which the stadium received plastic seats in the stands and a new Limonta MAX S 60 artificial turf pitch. In addition to the main 104 m × 68 m (114 yd × 74 yd) pitch, a smaller artificial turf pitch is located behind one of the goals, and running tracks surround the field.

In January 2022, Ukrzaliznytsia renovated the stadium's sports hall; the following month, the Russian invasion of Ukraine began.

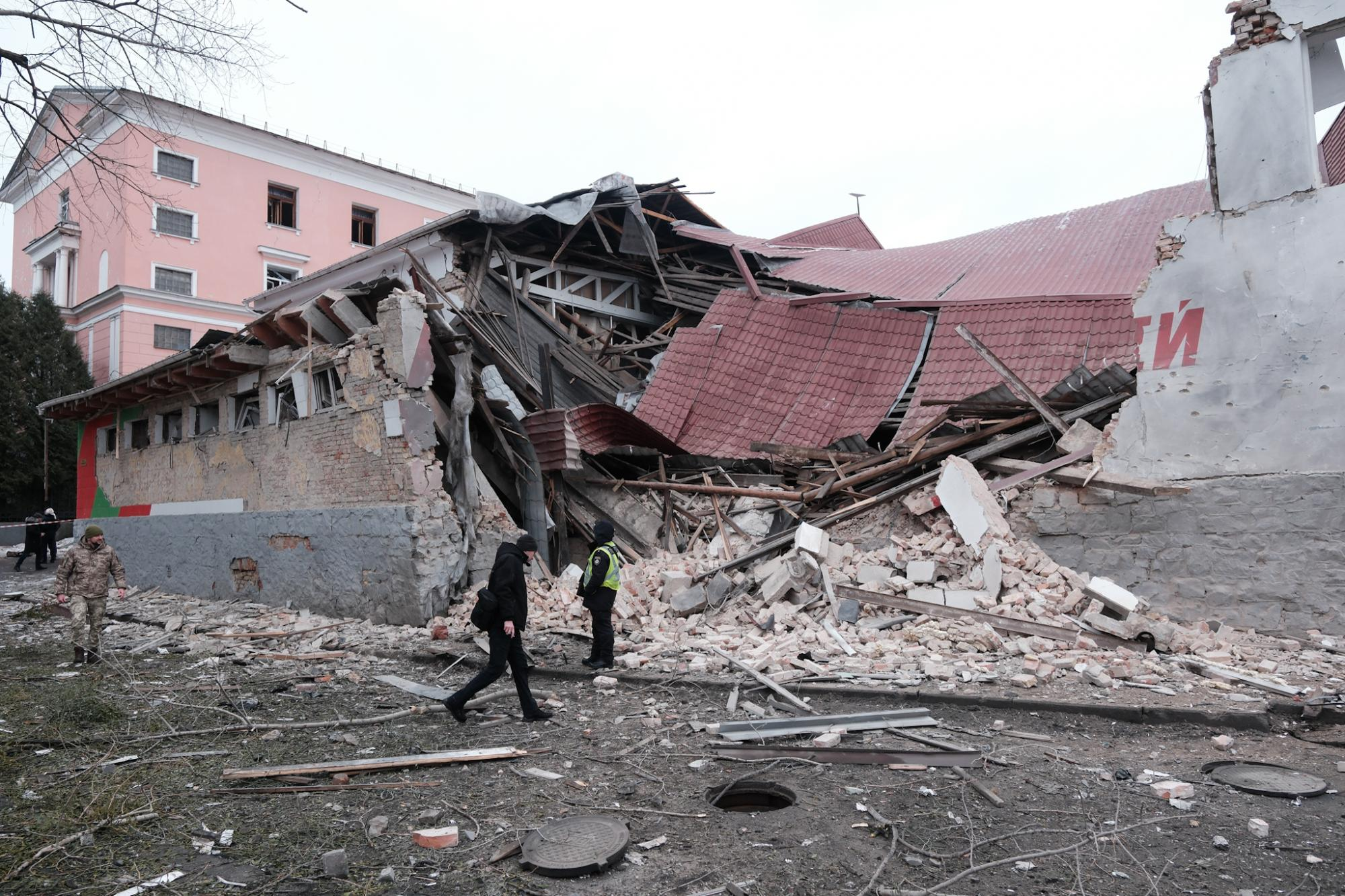
Aftermath of the Russian missile strike

On 23 January 2024, a Russian missile attack destroyed the main building, which housed the locker rooms, sports hall, and administrative offices of FC Lokomotyv.

In September 2024, Ukrzaliznytsia presented a reconstruction project for the sports complex, developed by the urban bureaus Big City Lab and PUPA, named "LokoCity". On 2 August 2025, on the 100th anniversary of Lokomotyv Stadium, Ukrzaliznytsia announced the start of the first stage of the stadium's reconstruction.
