= Beka Tugushi =

Georgian footballer

Personal information
- Date of birth: 24 January 1989 (age 37)
- Place of birth: Tbilisi, Georgian SSR
- Height: 1.88 m (6 ft 2 in)
- Position: Winger

Team information
- Current team: Samtredia
- Number: 8

Youth career
- 2007–2010: School No. 35 Tbilisi

Senior career*
Years	Team	Apps	(Gls)
2010–2011	KooTeePee	12	(4)
2011	PK-35 Vantaa	4	(1)
2012	Kolkheti Poti	17	(3)
2012–2014	Torpedo Kutaisi	31	(6)
2013	Metalurgi Rustavi	6	(0)
2014	Zestaponi	0	(0)
2014–2015	Torpedo Kutaisi	21	(3)
2015–2016	Ethnikos Achna	8	(0)
2016–2018	Torpedo Kutaisi	60	(8)
2018–	Samtredia	13	(1)

International career^{‡}
2017–	Georgia	2	(0)
- * Club domestic league appearances and goals as of 11 November 2018 ‡ National team caps and goals as of 17 March 2017

Beka Tugushi (Georgian: ბექა ტუღუში; born 24 January 1989) is a Georgian football player who plays for Samtredia.

== Club career ==
Tugushi spent the first years of his career in Finland, playing for KooTeePee and PK-35 Vantaa. He later returned to Georgia.

== International ==
Tugushi made his debut for the Georgia national football team on 23 January 2017 in a friendly against Uzbekistan.
