= Mahomed Mameshev =

Ukrainian footballer

Personal information
- Full name: Mahomed Yusufovych Mameshev
- Date of birth: 17 January 2002 (age 24)
- Place of birth: Kyiv, Ukraine
- Height: 1.80 m (5 ft 11 in)
- Position: Right winger

Youth career
- 2010–2020: Lokomotyv Kyiv

Senior career*
Years	Team	Apps	(Gls)
2020–2022	Nyva Ternopil	13	(0)
- * Club domestic league appearances and goals as of 30 May 2023

Mahomed Yusufovych Mameshev (Ukrainian: Магомед Юсуфович Мамешев; born 17 January 2002) is a Ukrainian professional footballer who plays as a right winger.
