= Oleh Kozishkurt =

Ukrainian footballer

Personal information
- Full name: Oleh Vadymovych Kozishkurt
- Date of birth: 9 September 2003 (age 23)
- Place of birth: Kyiv, Ukraine
- Height: 1.88 m (6 ft 2 in)
- Position: Central midfielder

Youth career
- 2014–2015: Atlet Kyiv
- 2015–2018: Lokomotyv Kyiv
- 2018–2020: Shakhtar Donetsk

Senior career*
Years	Team	Apps	(Gls)
2020–2021	Shakhtar Donetsk	0	(0)
2021–2022	Mariupol	1	(0)
2023–2024	Lokomotyv Kyiv	21	(1)
2024–2025	Lisne	11	(0)
2026	Bucha	0	(0)
2026	Druzhba-Kozaky	3	(0)
2026–	Bucha	0	(0)
- * Club domestic league appearances and goals as of 5 September 2026

Oleh Vadymovych Kozishkurt (Ukrainian: Олег Вадимович Козішкурт; born 9 September 2003) is a Ukrainian professional footballer who plays as a central midfielder.

In the summer of 2021, he moved to Mariupol as a free agent, where he initially played for the club's youth team. On September 18, 2021, he debuted in the T-shirt of the adult team of "Pryazovtsi" in the home match of the 8th round of the Premier League of Ukraine against Shakhtar Donetsk (0:5). Oleg entered the field in the starting lineup, and in the 61st minute he was replaced by Oleh Stepanenko
