= Mykyta Vovchenko =

Ukrainian footballer (born 1993)

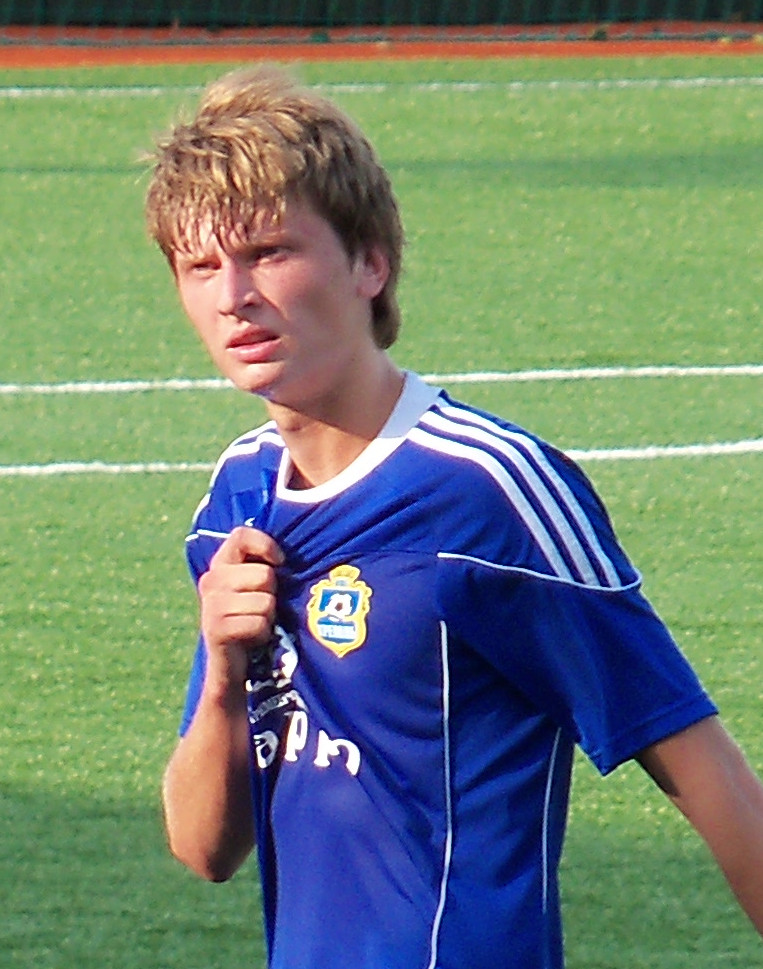
- With Kremin Kremenchuk in 2011

Personal information
- Full name: Mykyta Ihorovych Vovchenko
- Date of birth: 21 October 1993 (age 33)
- Place of birth: Omsk, Russia
- Height: 1.84 m (6 ft 0 in)
- Position: Midfielder

Youth career
- –2010: Kremin Kremenchuk

Senior career*
Years	Team	Apps	(Gls)
2010–2013	Kremin Kremenchuk	34	(2)
2013–2014	Obolon Kyiv	10	(2)
2014–2016	Poltava	19	(2)
2015–2016	Desna Chernihiv	6	(0)
2017–2019	Chemik Police		
2019–2020	Puszcza Niepołomice	5	(0)
2019–2020	Chemik Police	1	(0)
2020–2021	Kotwica Kołobrzeg	12	(1)
2021	Wybrzeże Rewalskie Rewal	9	(0)
2021–2022	Hutnik Szczecin	16	(5)
2022	Błękitni Stargard	8	(2)
2022	Chemik Police	0	(0)
- * Club domestic league appearances and goals as of 31 July 2024

Mykyta Ihorovych Vovchenko (Ukrainian: Микита Ігорович Вовченко; born 21 October 1993) is a Ukrainian professional footballer who plays as a midfielder.

== Career ==
Vovchenko started his career in 2010 with Kremin Kremenchuk, where he stayed until 2013, featuring in 34 league matches and scoring two goals. In the summer of 2013, he moved to Obolon Kyiv for one season, playing 10 matches and scoring twice. In 2014, Vovchenko joined Poltava until 2016, playing in 19 matches and scored two goals. In 2015, he signed with Desna Chernihiv for one season and playing six matches. In 2019, he moved to Puszcza Niepołomice in Poland, playing five matches in I liga. In the same season, he played one match for III liga side Chemik Police. In the summer of 2020, he moved to Kotwica Kołobrzeg in III liga, with the club finishing the 2020–21 season in 9th place of group II.

In the summer of 2022, Vovchenko returned to Chemik Police, but disappeared from the club after his first training session. Shortly after, he was discovered to be coordinating match-fixing in Polish lower divisions. On 10 November 2022, he was suspended indefinitely by the Polish Football Association.

== Honours ==
Kremin Kremenchuk

- Ukrainian Second League runner-up: 2009–10

Chemik Police

- IV liga West Pomerania: 2018–19
- Regional league Szczecin: 2017–18
- Polish Cup (Pomerania regionals): 2018–19
