= 2015–16 in Ukrainian football =

Football in Ukraine
- Season: 2015–16

Men's football
- Premier League: Dynamo Kyiv
- League 1: Zirka Kirovohrad
- League 2: Kolos Kovalivka
- Amateur League: Balkany Zorya (2016); Balkany Zorya (2015)
- Cup: Shakhtar Donetsk
- Amateur Cup: Hirnyk Sosnivka
- Super Cup: Shakhtar Donetsk

Women's football
- League High: Zhytlobud-2 Kharkiv (2016); Zhytlobud-1 Kharkiv (2015)
- League 1: Spartak Chernihiv (2016); Pantery Uman (2015)
- Women's Cup: Zhytlobud-1 Kharkiv (2016); Zhytlobud-1 Kharkiv (2015)

The 2015–16 season was the 25th season of competitive association football in Ukraine since dissolution of the Soviet Union.

== Men's club football ==
League	Promoted to league	Relegated from league
Premier League	FC Oleksandriya; Stal Dniprodzerzhynsk	~~Metalurh Donetsk~~; Illichivets Mariupol
League One	Cherkaskyi Dnipro; Obolon-Brovar Kyiv	~~Stal Alchevsk~~; Bukovyna Chernivtsi
League Two	FC Myr Hornostayivka; FC Kolos Kovalivka; FC Barsa Sumy; FC Inhulets Petrove; FC Arsenal-Kyiv; NK Veres Rivne; FC Nikopol-NHPU	~~NHPU-Makiivvuhillya Nikopol~~; ~~Shakhtar-3 Donetsk~~

Note: For all scratched clubs, see section Clubs removed for more details

=== Premier League ===
Pos	Team	Pld	W	D	L	GF	GA	GD	Pts	Qualification or relegation
1	Dynamo Kyiv (C)	26	23	1	2	54	11	+43	70	Qualification to Champions League group stage
2	Shakhtar Donetsk	26	20	3	3	76	25	+51	63	Qualification to Champions League third qualifying round (Note: Shakhtar Donetsk qualified for the Europa League group stage by winning the 2015–16 Ukrainian Cup. However, since they already qualified for European competition based on their league position, the spot awarded to the cup winners was passed down the league.)
3	Dnipro Dnipropetrovsk (Note: On 31 March 2016, the Adjudicatory Chamber of the UEFA Club Financial Control Body (CFCB) announced that Dnipro Dnipropetrovsk will be excluded from participating in the next UEFA club competition for which they would otherwise qualify in the next three (3) seasons (i.e. the 2016–17, 2017–18 and 2018–19 seasons).)	26	16	5	5	50	22	+28	53	
4	Zorya Luhansk	26	14	6	6	51	26	+25	48	Qualification to Europa League group stage
5	Vorskla Poltava	26	11	9	6	32	26	+6	42	Qualification to Europa League third qualifying round
6	FC Oleksandriya	26	10	8	8	30	29	+1	38	Qualification to Europa League third qualifying round
7	Karpaty Lviv	26	8	6	12	26	37	−11	30	
8	Stal Dniprodzerzhynsk	26	7	8	11	22	31	−9	29	
9	Olimpik Donetsk	26	6	7	13	22	35	−13	25	
10	Metalist Kharkiv	26	5	9	12	19	46	−27	24	Failed to receive attestation for the next season (Note: On 22 April 2016, the FFU Committee announced that Metalist Kharkiv and Hoverla Uzhhorod would not be allowed to participate in the professional competitions because of their debts to their players as well as Volyn Lutsk due to the fact that they had not even applied for a license for the following season. On 16 May 2016 the FFU Appeal Committee adopted decision to leave in force the decision of the FFU Football Clubs Attestation Committee of 22 April 2016 and refuse in issuing attestation for the next season for Hoverla Uzhhorod and Metalist Kharkiv by declining their appeals.)
11	Chornomorets Odesa	26	4	10	12	20	39	−19	22	
12	Volyn Lutsk (Note: Volyn Lutsk were deducted a total of eighteen points. Twelve points were deducted initially by FIFA for non-payment of wages owed to former players (Issa Ndoye and Dušan Savić). An additional six points were deducted by the Football Federation of Ukraine due to the club not complying with FIFA directives. On 30 May 2016 some Ukrainian media announced that Volyn was issued the attestation for the next season without financial guarantees. Later same day a FFU representative confirmed that Volyn managed to provide financial guarantees and made all required pre pays on time.)	26	10	8	8	36	36	0	20	
13	Hoverla Uzhhorod (Note: Hoverla Uzhhorod had nine points deducted due to not complying with decisions of the FFU Control and Disciplinary Committee (CDC).)	26	3	7	16	13	45	−32	7	Failed to receive attestation for the next season
14	Metalurh Zaporizhya (D)	26	0	3	23	7	50	−43	3	Expelled from competition during the season (Note: On 7 October 2015 FC Metalurh Zaporizhia petitioned to the Premier Liha to withdraw the club from the competition's participation due to the lack of financing. On 24 November 2015 Metalurh Zaporizhia informed the Premier Liha about decision of a deliberate assembly of the Metalurh Zaporizhia members in regards to liquidation of the club. Metalurh Zaporizhia were expelled from the competition after the winter break. Technical victories will be awarded to their opponents for the rest of season. In late April, it was announced that the team had not received a license for next season. On 2 March 2016 the Premier Liha cancelled the 17th round game for Metalurh Zaporizhia due to the fact that there are only four players were registered for the second half and only five more are allowed to be registered outside of a transfer window. Also the club failed to inform the league and the visiting team about place and time of the upcoming game.)

Source: uafootball.net.ua
Rules for classification: 1) Points; 2) Goal difference; 3) Goals scored; 4) Head-to-head points; 5) Head-to-head goal difference; 6) Head-to-head goals scored; 7) Fairplay ranking; 8) Draw.
(C) Champions; (D) Disqualified

=== League 1 ===
Pos	Team	Pld	W	D	L	GF	GA	GD	Pts	Promotion or relegation
1	Zirka Kirovohrad (C, P)	30	20	5	5	49	22	+27	65	Promoted to Ukrainian Premier League
2	Cherkaskyi Dnipro	30	16	7	7	45	27	+18	55	
3	Obolon-Brovar Kyiv	30	16	6	8	45	35	+10	54	
4	Illichivets Mariupol	30	14	11	5	34	23	+11	53	
5	Helios Kharkiv	30	13	12	5	33	24	+9	51	
6	Hirnyk Kryvyi Rih (D)	30	13	10	7	39	27	+12	49	Withdrew after the season (Note: Several weeks after the season completed the administration of Hirnyk Kryvyi Rih announced that the club would withdraw from the PFL. (23 June 2016))
7	MFC Mykolaiv (Note: The Control Disciplinary Committee of the Football Federation of Ukraine deducted three points and fined the clubs Nyva Ternopil, FC Ternopil and MFC Mykolaiv for match fixing during the 2014–15 season. (2 September 2015))	30	13	8	9	34	27	+7	44	
8	Desna Chernihiv	30	11	7	12	30	29	+1	40	
9	Naftovyk-Ukrnafta Okhtyrka	30	11	7	12	31	33	−2	40	
10	FC Poltava	30	10	8	12	29	32	−3	38	
11	Dynamo-2 Kyiv (D)	30	9	9	12	27	34	−7	36	Withdrew after the season (Note: The management of the senior club FC Dynamo Kyiv prior to the last game of the season announced that the reserve club, Dynamo-2 Kyiv would be terminating after the completion of the season.)
12	Hirnyk-Sport Komsomolsk	30	8	9	13	30	35	−5	33	
13	Avanhard Kramatorsk	30	8	8	14	28	42	−14	32	
14	FC Sumy	30	8	6	16	35	54	−19	30	Avoided relegation playoff (Note: Originally the fourteenth placed was to have played in a promotion-relegation playoff series against the third team in the Second League competition. However, two days before the end of the season, on 30 May 2016 the PFL ruled that due to sporting principles to keep 16 teams in the First League the promotion-relegation playoff match between the third placed team in the Second League against the 14th placed team in the First League was cancelled and that the third placed team in the Second League would be automatically promoted to the First League.)
15	FC Ternopil	30	6	7	17	18	47	−29	22	Avoided relegation (Note: Originally, as per competition regulations, the fifteenth placed team, FC Ternopil was to be relegated to the Ukrainian Second League. However, after the season at the Conference of the PFL in preparation for the 2016–17 Ukrainian First League season the committee decided to expand the competition to eighteen teams and include FC Ternopil.)
16	Nyva Ternopil (D)	30	2	4	24	10	26	−16	7	Withdrew during the season (Note: Nyva Ternopil announced that it will not play the first games of the spring half of the competition. The club indicated that it would compete in the Ternopil Oblast competition. The Football Federation of Ukraine formally expelled the club from the competition on 1 April 2016. Later In April 2016, the club joined the 2016 Ukrainian Football Amateur League.)

Source: (in Ukrainian) Professional Football League of Ukraine
Rules for classification: 1) points 2) goal difference 3) goals scored
4) head-to-head points 5) head-to-head goal difference 6) head-to-head goals scored
7) head-to-head fair play (all games) 8) draw or playoff
(C) Champions; (D) Disqualified; (P) Promoted

=== League 2 ===
Pos	Team	Pld	W	D	L	GF	GA	GD	Pts	Promotion or relegation
1	Kolos Kovalivka (C, P)	26	19	3	4	62	22	+40	60	Promoted to Ukrainian First League (Note: On 19 June 2015 the Professional Football League of Ukraine confirmed the number of clubs and criteria for relegation for the next season. It was decided that top two clubs would be promoted for the next season with the third playing play-off against the 14th placed team in the First League. However, two days before the end of the season, on 30 May 2016 the PFL ruled that due to sporting principles to keep 16 teams in the First League the promotion-relegation playoff match between the third placed team against the 14th placed team in the First League is cancelled and that the third placed team will be automatically promoted to the first League.)
2	Veres Rivne (P)	26	16	4	6	41	24	+17	52	Promoted to Ukrainian First League
3	Inhulets Petrove (P)	26	14	8	4	37	16	+21	50	Promoted to Ukrainian First League
4	Bukovyna Chernivtsi (P)	26	13	8	5	39	22	+17	47	Promoted to Ukrainian First League
5	Skala Stryi (P)	26	13	7	6	41	23	+18	46	Promoted to Ukrainian First League
6	Arsenal Kyiv (P)	26	13	4	9	37	30	+7	43	Promoted to Ukrainian First League
7	Real Pharma Odesa	26	12	5	9	31	29	+2	41	
8	Kremin Kremenchuk	26	11	7	8	43	31	+12	40	
9	Enerhiya Nova Kakhovka	26	10	3	13	31	38	−7	33	
10	Krystal Kherson	26	9	1	16	31	47	−16	28	
11	Myr Hornostayivka	26	8	3	15	38	47	−9	27	
12	Barsa Sumy	26	5	3	18	14	51	−37	18	Withdrew after the season (Note: After the season the Administration of Barsa Sumy informed the PFL that they would withdraw from the professional league. (7 July 2016))
13	Arsenal-Kyivshchyna Bila Tserkva	26	5	2	19	24	56	−32	17	
14	FC Nikopol-NPHU	26	2	6	18	18	51	−33	12	

Source: Scoresway
Rules for classification: 1) points 2) goal difference 3) goals scored 4) head-to-head points 5) head-to-head goal difference 6) head-to-head goals scored 7) head-to-head fair play (all games) 8) draw or playoff
(C) Champions; (P) Promoted

=== Cup competitions ===
==== Ukrainian Cup ====
21 May 2016
17:00

Zorya Luhansk	0–2	Shakhtar Donetsk
	Report	Hladkyy 42', 57'

Arena Lviv, Lviv
Attendance: 21,720
Referee: Yevhen Aranovskyi

==== Super Cup ====
14 July 2015

Dynamo Kyiv	0–2	Shakhtar Donetsk
	Report	Darijo Srna 90+2' (pen.); Taison 90+4'

Chornomorets Stadium, Odesa
Attendance: 34,164
Referee: Anatoliy Zhabchenko

== Women's club football ==
League	Promoted to league	Relegated from league
Higher League	Voskhod Stara Maiachka	~~Lehenda-ShVSM Chernihiv~~; Ateks SDIuShOR-16 Kyiv

Note: For all scratched clubs, see section Clubs removed for more details

=== Higher League ===
2015 Vyshcha Liha (women)
