= Football Association of Kyiv =

Football Association of Kyiv (FAK) (Ukrainian: Асоціація футболу міста Києва) is a football governing body in the region of Kyiv city, Ukraine. The association is a collective member of the Ukrainian Association of Football.

The city competitions separate from the Kyiv region started sometimes in mid 1930s with establishment of the city committee in physical culture and sports. However the first recorded official competitions started earlier just before the WWI in 1911 with creation of the Kiev Football League which existed until 1924. Following the disbandment of the Kiev Football League as a "heritage of the Tsarist regime", football competitions were conducted under auspices of regional council of physical culture gubernatorial and, after liquidations of gubernias, okruha (districtal). Due to inconsistency in conducting football competitions, in second half of 1920s they were organized by the Kyiv Trade Union council.

Clubs from Kyiv city sometimes compete in the championship of Kyiv Oblast and vice versa clubs from Kyiv Oblast sometimes compete in the championship of Kyiv city.

== Presidents ==
List of presidents

- 1966 – 1990 P. Frantsev
- 1990 – 1992 Volodymyr Muntyan
- 1992 – 2000 S. Shcherbak
- 2000 – 2002 Anatoliy Shepel
- 2002 – 2002 M. Hurynenko
- 2006 – Ihor Kochetov

== List of champions ==
- 1911 Politekhniki
- 1912 Sport
- 1913 Lyubiteli Sporta
- 1914 Lyubiteli Sporta (2)
- 1915 Sport (2)
- 1916 Politekhniki (2)
- 1917 no competition
- 1918 Maccabi
- 1919 not finished due to war
- 1920 Ukrainian-Soviet War
- 1921(s) 1. KSK of Lenin
- 1921(f) 1. KSK of Lenin (2)
- 1922(s) Zheldor
- 1922(f) Zheldor (2)
- 1923(s) Zheldor (3)
- 1923(f) Zheldor (4)
- 1924(s) Zheldor (5)
- 1924(f) Zheldor (6)
- 1925(s) no competition
- 1925(f) Zheldor (7)
- 1926(s) Zheldor (8)
- 1926(f) Zheldor (9)
- 1927(s) Raikomvod
- 1927(f) Zheldor (10)
- 1928 Raikomvod (2)
- 1929 Raikomvod (3)
- 1930 Mestran
- 1931 not finished
- 1932 no competition
- 1933 no competition
- 1934 Zheldor (11)
- 1935 Zheldor (12)
- 1936(s) ???
- 1936(f) ???
- 1937(s) KO DKA
- 1937(f) ???
- 1938(s) ???
- 1938(f) Dynamo
- 1939(s) ???
- 1939(f) ???
- 1940 Dynamo (2)
- 1941 not finished
- 1942-44 World War II
- 1945 Red Banner Artillery School
- 1946 Lokomotyv (13)
- 1947 Lokomotyv (14)
- 1948 ???
- 1949 ODO (2)
- 1950 Lokomotyv (15)
- 1951 Lokomotyv (16)
- 1952 ???
- 1953 Pecherskyi District
- 1954 Zenit (2)
- 1955 Dynamo (3)
- 1956 Zhovtnevyi District
- 1957 Bilshovyk
- 1958 Zhovtnevyi District (2)
- 1959 Bilshovyk (2)
- 1960 Zhovtnevyi District (3)
- 1961 SC Temp (4)
- 1962 SC Temp (5)
- 1963 ???
- 1964 Bilshovyk (3)
- 1965 Bilshovyk (4)
- 1966 ???
- 1967 SC Temp (6)
- 1968 ???
- 1969 Bilshovyk (5)
- 1970 Bilshovyk (6)
- 1971 Bilshovyk (7)
- 1972 Bilshovyk (8)
- 1973 Bilshovyk (9)
- 1974 ???
- 1975 SC Arsenal (3)
- 1976 Skhid
- 1977 Bilshovyk (10)
- 1978 Bilshovyk (11)
- 1979 Bilshovyk (12)
- 1980 Bilshovyk (13)
- 1981 ???
- 1982 ???
- 1983 ???
- 1984 Skhid (2)
- 1985 ???
- 1986 Bilshovyk (14)
- 1987 ???
- 1988 Verstatobudivnyk
- 1989 Metalist
- 1990 ???
- 1991 ???
- =independence of Ukraine=
- 1992-93 Zmina-Obolon
- 1993-94 Druzhba
- 1994-95 Lokomotyv (17)
- 1995-96 Dynamo-3
- 1996-97 Dynamo-3 (2)
- 1997-98 ???
- 1998-99 ATEK
- 1999-00 Dnipro
- 2000-01 Kyiv
- 2001-02 ATEK (2)
- 2002-03 Arsenal
- 2003 Sport School 15
- 2004 Alians
- 2005 OMIKS
- 2006 Alians (2)
- 2007 Zirka
- 2008 Zirka (2)
- 2009 Zirka (3)
- 2010 Zirka (4)
- 2011 Zirka (5)
- 2012 Zirka (6)
- 2013 Budstar Grup
- =Russo-Ukrainian War=
- 2014 Arsenal-Kyiv (2)
- 2015 Arsenal-Kyiv (3)
- 2016 Mezhyhiria Novi Petrivtsi
- 2017 Lokomotyv (18)
- 2017-18 Mezhyhiria Novi Petrivtsi (2)
- 2018-19 Lehia
- 2019-20 Mezhyhiria Novi Petrivtsi (3)
- 2020-21 Denhoff Denykhivka
- 2021-22 Denhoff Denykhivka (2)
- =full-scale Russian invasion=
- 2022-23 Atlet Kyiv
- 2023-24 Atlet Kyiv (2)

== Cup winners ==
- 1939 Dynamo
- 1940 Lokomotyv
- 1941 Lokomotyv
- 1942-43 World War II
- 1944 no competition
- 1945 no competition
- 1946 Dynamo
- 1947 Dynamo
- 1948 ???
- 1949 ODO
- 1950 Lokomotyv
- 1951 ODO
- 1952 Bilshovyk
- 1953 Arsenal
- 1954 Mashynobudivnyk
- 1955 ???
- 1956 Mashynobudivnyk
- 1957 Darnytsia Carriage Works
- 1958 Bilshovyk
- 1959 Bilshovyk
- 1960 Bilshovyk
- 1961 Bilshovyk
- 1962 Temp
- 1963 Bilshovyk
- 1964 Bilshovyk
- 1965 Bilshovyk
- 1966 Bilshovyk
- 1967 Bilshovyk
- 1968 Bilshovyk
- 1969 Bilshovyk
- 1970 Bilshovyk
- 1971 Bilshovyk
- 1972 Bilshovyk
- 1973 Bilshovyk
- 1974 Arsenal
- 1975 Bilshovyk
- 1976 Bilshovyk
- 1977 Chervonyi Ekskavator
- 1978 Bilshovyk
- 1979 Skhid
- 1980 Bilshovyk
- 1981 Skhid
- 1982 Skhid
- 1983 Skhid
- 1984 Skhid
- 1985 ???
- 1986 ???
- 1987 Bilshovyk
- 1988 Skhid
- 1989 ???
- 1990 Skhid
- 1991 Skhid
- 1992 Dynamo-3
- 1993 Zmina-Obolon
- 1994 Zmina-Obolon
- 1995 Dynamo-3
- 1996 Interkas
- 1997 Yevrobis
- 1998 ???
- 1999 ???
- 2001 ???
- 2002 ???
- 2003 Sport School 15
- 2004 Dnipro
- 2005 Alians
- 2006 Alians
- 2007-08 Kyiv
- 2008 Zirka
- 2009 Zirka
- 2010 Batkivshchyna
- 2011 Kyiv
- 2012 Batkivshchyna
- 2013 Batkivshchyna
- 2014 FC Mezhyhiria Novi Petrivtsi
- 2015 FC Mezhyhiria Novi Petrivtsi
- 2016 FC Dinaz Vyshhorod
- 2017
- 2018

== Professional clubs ==
=== Men's clubs ===
- FC Dynamo Kyiv, 1936-1941, 1944-present (89 seasons)
  - Dynamo-2, 1965, 1992-2016 (26 seasons)
  - Dynamo-3, 1993-1995, 1996-2008 (14 seasons)
- FC Lokomotyv Kyiv, 1936-1940, 2023– (8 seasons)
- SC Spartak Kyiv, 1937, 1949 (2 seasons)
- FC CSKA Kyiv (ODO, SKVO, SKA, SC Chernihiv, ZS Oriyana, CSK ZSU, CSKA-2), 1947-1949, 1952-1958, 1961-1987, 1990-2009 (57 seasons)
- SC Arsenal Kyiv, 1959-1963 (5 seasons)
- SC Temp Kyiv, 1964 (a season)

- FC Arsenal-Kyiv Kyiv (FC Boryspil, Borysfen, CSKA-Borysfen, CSKA, Arsenal), 1993-2013, 2015-2019 (24 seasons)
  - Arsenal-2, 2003/04 (a season)
- FC Obolon Kyiv (Obolon-PPO), 1993-2013 (20 seasons)
  - Obolon-2, 1998-2000, 2001-2009, 2012–2013 (11 seasons)
- FC Obolon Kyiv (Obolon-Brovar), 2013- (12 seasons)
  - Obolon-2 Bucha, 2019-2021 (2 seasons)
- FC Rubikon Kyiv, 2020-2023 (3 seasons)
- AFSC Kyiv, 2021–2022 (a season)
- FC Livyi Bereh Kyiv, 2021–2022, 2023– (3 seasons)
- FC UCSA Kyiv, 2023– (2 seasons)

=== Women's clubs ===
- Dynamo Kyiv, 1989-1994, 2022–2024
- Arena Kyiv, 1989-1993
- Tornado Kyiv (Nyva Baryshivka, Olimp Kyiv), 1989-1993
- Alina Kyiv (Radosin Kyiv), 1990-1997

- Spartak Kyiv, 1995
- Kyivska Rus Kyiv, 1999-2001
- Ateks Kyiv, 2003-2007, 2009-2018, 2021-2022
- Oleksandriya Kyiv, 2003
- Slavia Kyiv, 2003
- Sotstekh Kyiv, 2004
- Obolon Kyiv, 2024-

== Other clubs at national/republican level ==
Note: the list includes clubs that played at republican competitions before 1959 and the amateur or KFK competitions after 1964..

- DO/UDKA, 1936, 1946, 1949–1951
- Vympel, 1937
- Dynamo (klubnaya) (Dynamo-2, Dynamo-3), 1938, 1939, 1948, 1950, 1951, 1956, 1992/93 – 1994/95, 1996/97
- Lokomotyv, 1946, 1947, 1953–1957, 1980, 1981, 2021/22, 2022/23
- Spartak, 1946, 1954, 1956
- v/c 25750, 1948
- Trudovi Rezervy, 1948
- Mashynobudivnyk, 1949, 1952, 1953, 1955–1958
- Zenit, 1954
- Chervonyi Prapor, 1949
- Bilshovyk, 1952, 1973 – 1985, 1987 – 1990
- Torpedo, 1955–1959
- DRVZ, 1957–1959
- Vostok, 1964, 1977 – 1980, 1982 – 1990
- Temp (Zhovtnevyi Raion), 1957–1959, 1965, 1968, 1969
- Khimik, 1966
- Avtomobilist, 1971
- Arsenal, 1972 – 1977, 1979, 1980
- Chervonyi Ekskavator, 1978
- Olimpiets, 1981
- Metalist, 1986, 2005
- CSKA-2 (SKA, CSKA-3), 1988, 1989, 1995/96, 1999, 2000
- Krai, 1992/93, 1993/94
- Obolon-Zmina (Obolon-2), 1993/94, 1994/95, 1998/99, 2013
- Olimpik, 1993/94, 1994/95
- Interkas, 1997/98, 1998/99
- Dnipro, 1999 – 2003
- Zirka, 2008
- KNTEU, 2009
- Rubikon, 2017/18 – 2019/20
- Atlet Kyiv, 2019/20 – 2024/25
- Yednist, 2020/21, 2021/22
- Livyi Bereh, 2020/21
- Akademia Futbolu, 2020/21
- OC imeni Piddubnoho, 2021/22
- UCSA, 2021/22
- Rebel, 2024/25

== Notable footballers ==
=== Soviet Union national football team ===
- Oleg Blokhin
- Oleksiy Mykhaylychenko
- Anatoliy Byshovets
- Viacheslav Semenov
- Viktor Kanevskiy
- Vadym Sosnykhin
- Volodymyr Levchenko
- Valeriy Lobanovskyi
- Andriy Biba
- Anatoliy Shepel
- Valeriy Zuyev
- Mykola Pavlov

=== Ukraine national football team ===
- Oleksandr Shovkovskyi
- Vladyslav Vashchuk
- Oleksandr Kucher
- Illia Zabarnyi
- Roman Zozulya
- Serhiy Fedorov
- Yevhen Makarenko
- Vyacheslav Sviderskyi
- Ihor Zhabchenko
- Oleh Venhlinskyi
- Oleksandr Romanchuk
- Denys Boyko
- Serhiy Mizin
- Pylyp Budkivskyi
- Ihor Plastun
- Yevhen Cheberyachko
- Oleh Dopilka
- Yevhen Lutsenko
- Oleksiy Mykhaylychenko
- Oleksandr Rybka
- Artem Shabanov
- Valentyn Slyusar
- Oleksandr Syrota
- Oleksandr Andriyevskyi
- Andriy Bohdanov
- Denys Dedechko
- Mykola Ishchenko
- Ihor Kostyuk
- Serhiy Myakushko
- Oleh Naduda
- Andriy Pylyavskyi
- Vladyslav Veleten
- Oleksandr Yakovenko
- Oleksandr Yatsenko

== See also ==
- FFU Council of Regions
- Kyiv Oblast Football Association
