= Rudolf Sukhomlynov =

Ukrainian footballer

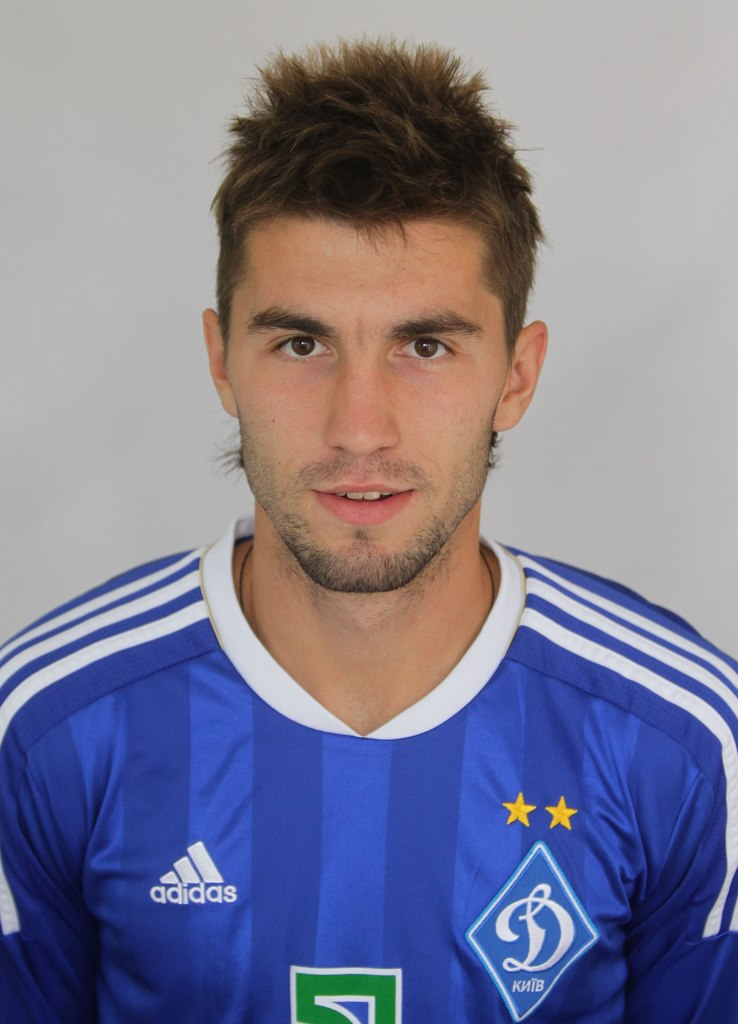

Personal information
- Full name: Rudolf Olehovych Sukhomlynov
- Date of birth: 11 March 1993 (age 33)
- Place of birth: Kyiv, Ukraine
- Height: 1.77 m (5 ft 10 in)
- Position: Left-back

Youth career
- 1999–2010: Dynamo Kyiv

Senior career*
Years	Team	Apps	(Gls)
2010–2013	Dynamo Kyiv	0	(0)
2011–2013	→ Dynamo-2 Kyiv	27	(0)
2013	Mykolaiv	1	(0)
2014–2015	Desna Chernihiv	38	(0)
2016	Skonto	0	(0)
2016–2017	Desna Chernihiv	9	(0)
2016	→ Zugdidi (loan)	7	(0)
2017	Samtredia	8	(0)
2017	Arsenal Kyiv	0	(0)
2018	Volyn Lutsk	16	(0)
2019	Polissya Zhytomyr	3	(0)
2019	Shevardeni-1906 Tbilisi	14	(1)
2020	Nyva Ternopil	0	(0)
2021	Atlet Kyiv	8	(0)
2021–2022	Olimpik Donetsk	1	(0)
2022	→ Rubikon Kyiv (loan)	16	(0)
2023	Lokomotyv Kyiv	13	(0)

International career^{‡}
2008–2009	Ukraine U16	11	(2)
2009–2010	Ukraine U17	10	(0)
2010–2011	Ukraine U18	10	(0)
2011	Ukraine U19	4	(0)
- * Club domestic league appearances and goals as of 1 February 2024 ‡ National team caps and goals as of 12 February 2022

Rudolf Olehovych Sukhomlynov (Ukrainian: Рудольф Олегович Сухомлинов; born 11 March 1993) is a Ukrainian professional footballer who plays as a left-back.

== Career ==
Sukhomlynov is a product of the Dynamo Kyiv youth sportive school. His first coaches were Vitaliy Khmelnytskyi and Yuriy Yastrebynskyi.

He spent his career in the Ukrainian First League clubs Dynamo-2 Kyiv and Mykolaiv, Desna Chernihiv.

== Personal life ==
He is the nephew of fellow footballer Vladyslav Sukhomlynov.

== Honours ==
=== Club ===
Samtredia

- Georgian Super Cup: 2017
