= FC Lokomotyv Kyiv =

Football club in Kyiv, Ukraine

Lokomotiv Kyiv
- Full name: Football Club Lokomotiv Kyiv
- Nickname: LOKO
- Founded: 1919; 107 years ago as ZhelDor
- Ground: Lokomotyv Stadium, Kyiv
- Capacity: 1,631
- Owner: Southwestern Railways
- Chairman: Oleksandr Yehorov
- Head coach: Vadym Lazorenko
- League: Ukrainian First League
- 2025–26: Ukrainian Second League, Group B, 1st of 11 (promoted)
- Website: https://lokomotyv.com/
Home colours	Away colours

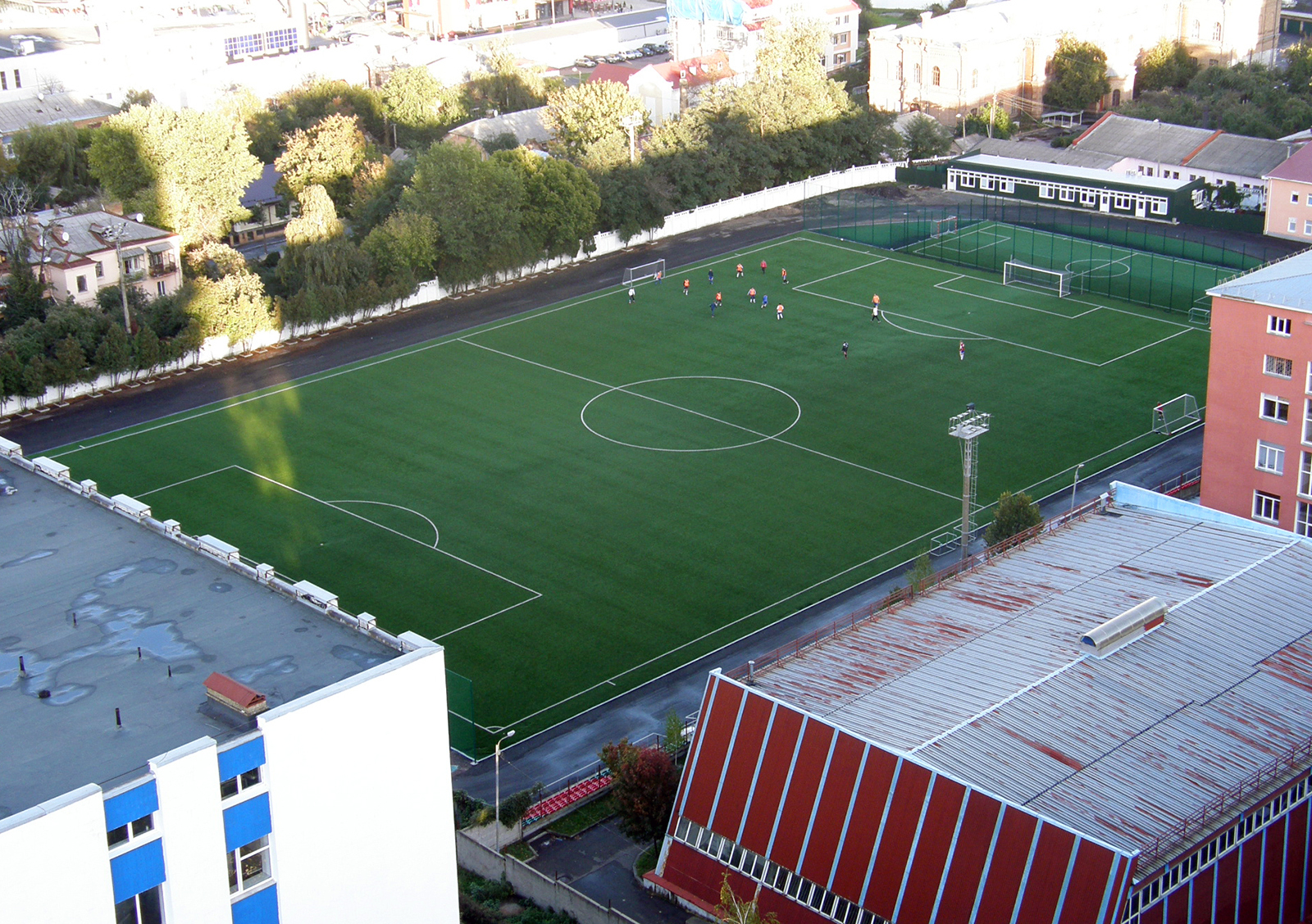
Lokomotyv Stadium in Kyiv

Football Club Lokomotiv Kyiv (Ukrainian: ФК Локомотив Київ) is a football club from Kyiv, Ukraine, owned by the South Western Railway. It currently participates in various Kyiv city football competitions and play in Ukrainian First League from 2026–27 after promotion from Second League in 2025–26. It also fields several of its junior teams in the Ukrainian youth league.

== History ==
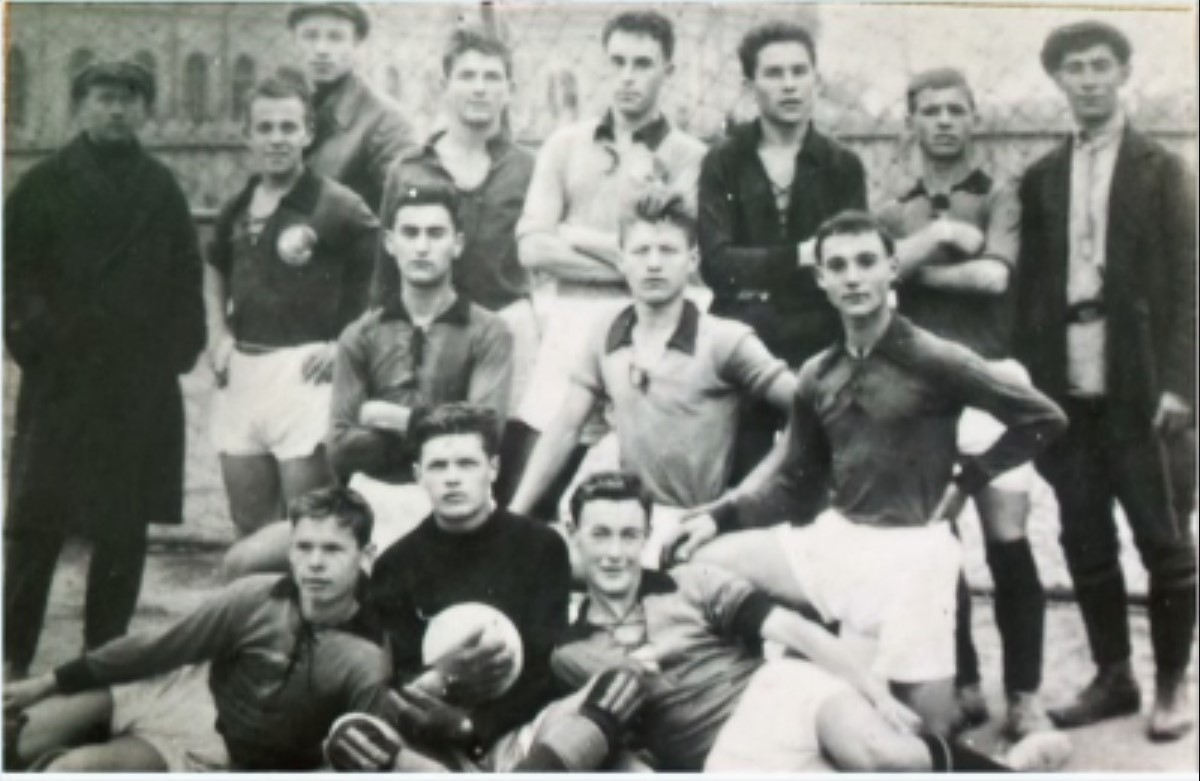
One of the first photos, 1919

Founded in 1919, as ZhelDor (Russian: ЖелДор, abbr. Railroad), soon after joining the Soviet Lokomotiv sports society, it changed its name twice, to Lokomotiv in 1936 and Lokomotiv Yuga in 1940. The team played its home games at its own stadium.

Lokomotyv Kyiv was among the first Ukrainian teams of masters, which were admitted to Soviet football league competitions in 1936. They made their debut at the 1936 Gruppa V (third tier). The spring competition was conducted in a single round-robin format with 8 participants. Lokomotyv placed 8th, right behind Ugolschiki Stalino (today Shakhtar Donetsk), and were relegated down to Gruppa G. The fall competition in Gruppa G was also conducted in a single round-robin format with 6 teams competing. Lokomotyv placed 3rd behind KhTZ Kharkiv (winners) and Stal Dnipropetrovsk.

Already in 1938, the Soviet football competitions were reorganized substantially. An enlarged single league was established for all teams of masters, and Lokomotyv Kyiv was admitted. The competitions were once again conducted in a single round-robin format and included 26 participants. Lokomotyv placed 17th in the 1938 Gruppa A and were relegated to Gruppa B. During the war years in 1939 and 1940, Lokomotyv competed in the second tier, Gruppa B. Along with the Soviet competitions, the club was participating in the Kyiv championships, which they won on multiple occasions. Before World War II, Lokomotyv was a regular participant in the Soviet Cup and the Football Cup of the Ukrainian SSR.

Following World War II, the club has competed in republican (Ukrainian SSR) and regional (Kyiv Oblast/City) competitions. Lookomotyv took part in no less than 7 seasons of the Football Championship of the Ukrainian SSR: 1946, 1947, 1953–1957; and at least 2 more seasons in the Ukrainian KFK football competitions: 1980 and 1981.

In 1958, the club was disbanded. A newly established Lokomotyv was forced to relocate to Vinnytsia, which in turn led to the creation of a new club Lokomotyv Vinnytsia (today Nyva Vinnytsia), which represented Southwestern Railways then. Lokomotyv remained in Vinnytsia until 1978, when the Vinnytsia team was passed on to the Kolos sports society.

The club's senior team was revived in 2021 and entered the 2021–22 Ukrainian Football Amateur League, which was interrupted by the 2022 Russian full-scale invasion of Ukraine.

In 2025–26 season, Lokomotyv Kyiv secure promotion to Ukrainian First League for the first time in their history from next season after finishing first place in Group B.

The club is now known for good training of young talent and selling them to domestic and European clubs. The most successful players among them are Andriy Yarmolenko and Oleksandr Yakovenko, who played for Belgian side Anderlecht. The club participated in the Second League.

== Current squad ==
As of 7 September 2026

Note: Flags indicate national team as defined under FIFA eligibility rules; some limited exceptions apply. Players may hold more than one non-FIFA nationality.

No.	Pos.	Nation	Player
1	GK	UKR	Roman Lyopka
3	DF	UKR	Roman Savchenko (on loan from Shakhtar Donetsk)
5	DF	UKR	Mykola Syrash
6	MF	UKR	Artem Sabalayev
7	MF	UKR	Bohdan Mordas
8	FW	UKR	Kyrylo Frolov
9	FW	UKR	Bohdan Manuylov
10	FW	UKR	Danylo Holub
11	MF	UKR	Oleksiy Sakhnenko
12	GK	UKR	Arsen Belimenko
14	FW	NGR	Faruk Ikenna Saheed
16	DF	UKR	Ilya Zasovitskyi (on loan from Kharkiv)
17	MF	UKR	Andriy Holovatenko

No.	Pos.	Nation	Player
18	DF	UKR	Denys Harkavenko
19	DF	UKR	Ruslan Tkachenko (on loan from Kharkiv)
23	FW	UKR	Daniil Belytskyi
27	MF	UKR	Volodymyr Tymenko
32	DF	UKR	Daniil Romanenko
33	FW	UKR	Serhiy Myakushko
44	DF	UKR	Tymur Titarenko
47	FW	UKR	Ihnat Pushkutsa (on loan from Veres Rivne)
71	GK	UKR	Maksym Karpenko
77	MF	UKR	Oleksandr Savchuk
90	MF	UKR	Petro Savchuk
99	DF	UKR	Yevheniy Yarmak

=== Out on loan ===
Note: Flags indicate national team as defined under FIFA eligibility rules; some limited exceptions apply. Players may hold more than one non-FIFA nationality.

No. / Pos. / Nation / Player	No. / Pos. / Nation / Player

== Honours ==
- Ukrainian Second League: 2025–26 (Group B)
- Kyiv city (1st tier)
  - Winners (5): 1945-46, 1946-47, 1949-50, 1950-51, 2016–17

== League history ==
=== Soviet Union / Ukrainian SSR ===
Season	Div.	Pos.	Pl.	W	D	L	GS	GA	P	All-Union Cup	Republican Cup	Europe	Notes

=== Ukraine ===
Season	Div.	Pos.	Pl.	W	D	L	GS	GA	P	Ukrainian Cup	Europe		Notes
2023–24	3rd(Second League "B")	10_{/14}	26	7	7	12	34	43	28	Third preliminary round (1/32)	-	-	-
2024–25	3rd(Second League "B")	3_{/10}	18	11	5	2	22	21	30	First preliminary round (1/64)	-	-	The league's play-offs:Third place play-off-Preliminary round FC Skala Stryi (1911) 1:4
2025–26	3rd(Second League "B")	1_{/11}	30	22	4	4	65	16	70	Quarter-finals (1/4)	-	-	Promoted to Ukrainian First League Title play-off: Kulykiv-Bilka 1:2
2026–27	2nd(First League)	7_{/16}	12	4	5	3	15	13	16	Round of 64 (1/32)	-	-	TBD

== Notable players ==
- (Soviet Union) Makar Honcharenko
- (Soviet Union) Kostyantyn Fomin
- (Soviet Union) Mikhail Tovarovsky
- (Ukraine) Viktor Melnyk
- (Ukraine) Yuriy Klymchuk
- (Ukraine) Kyrylo Romanyuk
- (Ukraine) Yevheniy Shevchenko
- (Ukraine) Viktor Sakhnyuk
- (Ukraine) Oleh Kozishkurt

== Head coaches ==
- –2023 Valeriy Havrylov
- 2023 Ruslan Umanets
- 2023–2025 Vadym Lazorenko
- 2025 Nazar Kozak (acting)
- 2025– Serhiy Karpenko

== Lokomotyv football academy ==
=== Notable alumni ===
- (Ukraine) Andriy Yarmolenko (youth)
- (Ukraine) Oleksandr Yakovenko (youth)
- (Ukraine) Kyrylo Kovalets (youth)
- (Ukraine) Anton Kanibolotskyi (youth)
- (Ukraine) Oleksiy Dovhyi (youth)
- (Ukraine) Oleh Synyohub (youth)
- (Ukraine) Serhiy Shapoval (youth)
- (Ukraine) Serhiy Herasymets (youth)
- (Ukraine) Yuriy Shevel (youth)
- (Ukraine) Roman Yalovenko (youth)
- (Ukraine) Oleksandr Shevchenko (youth)
- (Ukraine) Mahomed Mameshev (youth)
