= Vadym Zhuk =

Ukrainian footballer (born 1991)

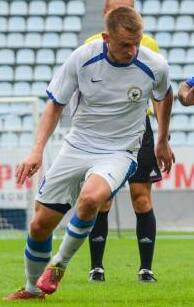
- Zhuk in 2015

Personal information
- Full name: Vadym Vadymovych Zhuk
- Date of birth: 15 April 1991 (age 35)
- Place of birth: Kyiv, Ukrainian SSR
- Height: 1.81 m (5 ft 11 in)
- Position: Right-back

Team information
- Current team: Bayern Hof
- Number: 3

Youth career
- 2004–2008: Knyazha Shchaslyve

Senior career*
Years	Team	Apps	(Gls)
2009–2011	Lviv	32	(0)
2009–2010	→ Lviv-2	24	(0)
2012–2015	Desna Chernihiv	90	(1)
2016	Hirnyk Kryvyi Rih	10	(0)
2016	Spartak Subotica	3	(0)
2017	Sumy	15	(0)
2017	Desna Chernihiv	7	(0)
2018	Poltava	11	(0)
2018–2020	Metalist 1925 Kharkiv	43	(2)
2020–2021	Polissya Zhytomyr	17	(0)
2021	Hirnyk-Sport Horishni Plavni	0	(0)
2021–2022	Desna Chernihiv	6	(0)
2022–	Bayern Hof	14	(0)
- * Club domestic league appearances and goals as of 20 November 2022

Vadym Vadymovych Zhuk (Ukrainian: Вадим Вадимович Жук; born 15 April 1991) is a Ukrainian professional footballer who plays as a right-back for Bayernliga Nord club Bayern Hof.

== Career ==
Zhuk is the product of the FC Knyazha Shchaslyve academy system.

=== Desna Chernihiv ===
From 2012 until 2015, he played for Desna Chernihiv, with whom he won the 2012–13 Ukrainian Second League.

=== Hirnyk Kryvyi Rih ===
In 2016 he moved to Hirnyk Kryvyi Rih.

=== Spartak Subotica ===
Later in 2016 he moved to Spartak Subotica in the Serbian SuperLiga.

=== Desna Chernihiv ===
In 2017 he signed with Desna Chernihiv for the second time. In the 2017–18 season, he helped the team earn promotion to the Ukrainian Premier League.

=== Poltava ===
In 2018 he moved to Poltava in the Ukrainian Second League.

=== Polissya Zhytomyr ===
In 2020 he moved to Polissya Zhytomyr in the Ukrainian First League.

=== Desna Chernihiv ===
On 22 July 2021 he returned to Desna Chernihiv on a one-year contract. On 25 July, he made his Ukrainian Premier League debut against Chornomorets Odesa at the Stadion Yuri Gagarin, replacing Oleksandr Safronov in the 71st minute.

=== Bayern Hof ===
On 24 July 2022 he moved to Bayern Hof in the Landesliga Bayern-Nordost. On 29 July he played his first match with the new club against Würzburger FV at the Stadion Grüne Au.

== Career statistics ==
As of match played 20 November 2022

Appearances and goals by club, season and competition
Club	Season	League			Cup		Europe		Other		Total	
Club	Season	Division	Apps	Goals	Apps	Goals	Apps	Goals	Apps	Goals	Apps	Goals
Lviv-2 (On Loan)	2009–10	Ukrainian First League	19	0	0	0	0	0	0	0	19	0
Lviv	2010–11	Ukrainian First League	12	0	0	0	0	0	0	0	12	0
Lviv	2011–12	Ukrainian First League	20	0	0	0	0	0	0	0	20	0
Desna Chernihiv	2012–13	Ukrainian Second League	24	0	1	0	0	0	0	0	25	0
Desna Chernihiv	2013–14	Ukrainian First League	18	0	3	0	0	0	0	0	21	0
Desna Chernihiv	2014–15	Ukrainian First League	26	1	1	0	0	0	0	0	27	1
Hirnyk Kryvyi Rih	2015–16	Ukrainian First League	10	0	0	0	0	0	0	0	10	0
Spartak Subotica	2016–17	Serbian SuperLiga	3	0	0	0	0	0	0	0	3	0
Sumy	2016–17	Ukrainian First League	13	0	2	0	0	0	0	0	15	0
Desna Chernihiv	2017–18	Ukrainian First League	7	0	0	0	0	0	0	0	7	0
Poltava	2017–18	Ukrainian First League	11	0	0	0	0	0	0	0	11	0
Metalist 1925 Kharkiv	2018–19	Ukrainian First League	22	2	1	0	0	0	0	0	23	2
Metalist 1925 Kharkiv	2019–20	Ukrainian First League	21	0	0	0	0	0	0	0	21	0
Polissya Zhytomyr	2020–21	Ukrainian First League	17	0	2	0	0	0	0	0	19	0
Desna Chernihiv	2021–22	Ukrainian Premier League	6	0	1	0	0	0	0	0	7	0
Bayern Hof	2022–23	Bayernliga	14	0	0	0	0	0	0	0	14	0
Career total			243	3	11	0	0	0	0	0	254	3

== Honours ==
Desna Chernihiv

- Ukrainian First League: 2017–18
- Ukrainian Second League: 2012–13
