= Yevhen Chepurnenko =

Ukrainian footballer (born 1989)

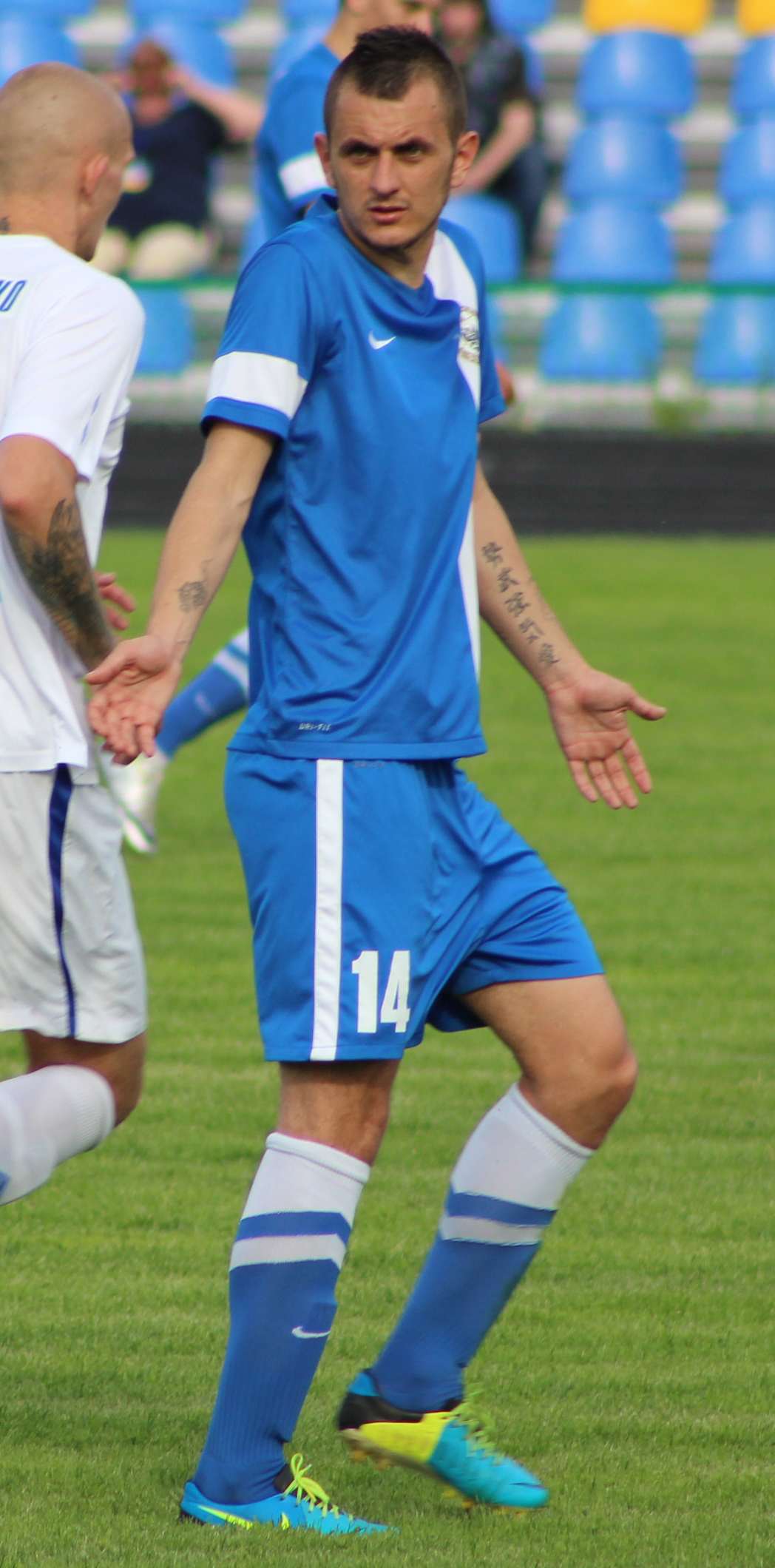

Personal information
- Full name: Yevhen Kostyantynovych Chepurnenko
- Date of birth: 6 September 1989 (age 37)
- Place of birth: Berdyansk, Ukrainian SSR, Soviet Union
- Height: 1.81 m (5 ft 11 1/2 in)
- Position: Midfielder

Team information
- Current team: FC Kalynivka

Youth career
- 2002–2003: Lokomotyv-MSM-OMIKS Kyiv
- 2003–2004: Vidradnyi Kyiv
- 2005–2006: Knyazha Schaslyve

Senior career*
Years	Team	Apps	(Gls)
2006–2007	Knyazha Schaslyve	28	(6)
2007–2008	Lviv	31	(8)
2008	Knyazha Schaslyve	11	(2)
2009–2011	Lviv	50	(11)
2011	Sevastopol	14	(1)
2012–2014	Desna Chernihiv	61	(18)
2014–2015	Oleksandriya	17	(2)
2015–2017	Desna Chernihiv	73	(20)
2018	Helios Kharkiv	10	(1)
2018	Volyn Lutsk	0	(0)
2018	Dnepr Mogilev	6	(0)
2019	Ahrobiznes Volochysk	8	(0)
2019–2020	Shevardeni-1906 Tbilisi	18	(4)
2020	Dinaz Vyshhorod	11	(9)
2021	Desna Chernihiv	8	(1)
2021	Dinaz Vyshhorod	18	(10)
2022	Zhetysu	10	(6)
2022	Odra Wodzisław Śląski	6	(1)
2022	Bukovyna Chernivtsi	4	(0)
2023	Kudrivka	14	(4)
2024	Nyva Buzova	5	(0)
2024	Dinaz Vyshhorod	11	(1)
2024–	Kalynivka	0	(0)
- * Club domestic league appearances and goals as of 23 January 2025

Yevhen Kostyantynovych Chepurnenko (Ukrainian: Євген Костянтинович Чепурненко; born 6 September 1989) is a Ukrainian professional footballer who plays as a midfielder.

== Career ==
=== Desna Chernihiv ===
In 2015, he returned to FC Desna Chernihiv, the main team of Chernihiv, where he stayed until 2017.

=== Dnepr Mogilev ===
In 2018, he moved to Belarusian side Dnepr Mogilev.

=== Shevardeni-1906 Tbilisi ===
In 2019, he joined Georgian club Shevardeni-1906 Tbilisi.

=== Dinaz Vyshhorod ===
In 2020, he signed for Dinaz Vyshhorod in Ukrainian Second League. He was voted the Best Player of the round 4 of the 2020–21 season. In January 2021, he extended his contract.

=== Return to Desna ===
On 19 February 2021, he rejoined Desna Chernihiv in Ukrainian Premier League. He made his league debut against Dynamo Kyiv at the Valeriy Lobanovskyi Dynamo Stadium, replacing Pylyp Budkivskyi. On 8 March 2021, he scored his first goal of the 2020–21 league season in a 0–4 away win Rukh Lviv at the Skif Stadium. In the summer of 2021, his contract with the club expired.

=== Return to Dinaz ===
On 5 July 2021, he returned to Dinaz Vyshhorod in Ukrainian Second League, signing a one-year contract. On 31 July, he scored against Dnipro Cherkasy. He was elected Best Player of the round 5 of the 2021–22 season. On 4 September, he scored two goals against Bukovyna. On 29 October, he scored twice against Rubikon Kyiv.

=== Zhetysu ===
In May 2022, he moved to Zhetysu in Kazakhstan First League. During his stay, he scored 6 goals in 10 league matches, before leaving the club on 17 July 2022.

=== Odra Wodzisław ===
On 31 July 2022, Chepurnenko signed a one-year deal with Polish III liga side Odra Wodzisław Śląski. On 7 August, he played his first match with the new club against Pniówek Pawłowice Śląskie. A week later, he scored his first goal for Odra against Goczałkowice-Zdrój. On 9 October, Odra announced they had amicably terminated their contract with Chepurenko.

=== Bukovyna Chernivtsi ===
In November 2022 he signed for Bukovyna Chernivtsi. In January 2023 he left the club by mutual consent.

=== FC Kalynivka ===
He signed also for Kalynivka and on 11 August 2026 he scored in Ukrainia Cup against Chaika Vyshhorod.

== Career statistics ==
=== Club ===
As of match played 23 January 2025

Appearances and goals by club, season and competition
Club	Season	League			Cup		Europe		Other		Total	
Club	Season	Division	Apps	Goals	Apps	Goals	Apps	Goals	Apps	Goals	Apps	Goals
Knyazha Schaslyve	2005–06	Ukrainian Second League	3	1	0	0	—		0	0	3	1
Knyazha Schaslyve	2006–07	Ukrainian Second League	25	5	0	0	—		0	0	25	5
Knyazha Schaslyve	Total		28	6	0	0	—		0	0	28	6
Lviv	2007–08	Ukrainian Second League	31	8	0	0	—		0	0	31	8
Knyazha Schaslyve	2008–09	Ukrainian First League	11	2	0	0	—		0	0	0	0
Lviv	2008–09	Ukrainian Premier League	0	0	0	0	—		0	0	0	0
Lviv	2009–10	Ukrainian First League	23	2	1	0	—		0	0	24	2
Lviv	2010–11	Ukrainian First League	27	9	1	0	—		0	0	28	9
Lviv	Total		50	11	2	0	—		0	0	52	11
Sevastopol	2011–12	Ukrainian First League	14	1	2	1	—		0	0	16	2
Desna Chernihiv	2011–12	Ukrainian Second League	9	4	1	0	—		0	0	10	4
Desna Chernihiv	2012–13	Ukrainian Second League	30	7	2	0	—		0	0	32	7
Desna Chernihiv	2013–14	Ukrainian First League	22	7	3	0	—		0	0	25	7
Desna Chernihiv	Total		61	18	6	0	—		0	0	67	18
Oleksandriya	2014–15	Ukrainian First League	17	2	1	1	—		0	0	18	3
Desna Chernihiv	2015–16	Ukrainian First League	28	11	1	0	—		0	0	29	11
Desna Chernihiv	2016–17	Ukrainian First League	26	6	3	0	—		0	0	29	6
Desna Chernihiv	2017–18	Ukrainian First League	19	3	3	0	—		0	0	22	3
Desna Chernihiv	Total		73	20	7	0	—		0	0	80	20
Helios Kharkiv	2017–18	Ukrainian First League	10	1	0	0	—		0	0	10	1
Dnepr Mogilev	2018	Belarusian Premier League	6	0	0	0	0	0	0	0	6	0
Ahrobiznes Volochysk	2018–19	Ukrainian First League	8	0	2	0	—		0	0	10	0
Shevardeni-1906 Tbilisi	2019	Erovnuli Liga 2	16	4	0	0	—		0	0	16	4
Shevardeni-1906 Tbilisi	2020	Erovnuli Liga 2	2	0	0	0	—		0	0	2	0
Shevardeni-1906 Tbilisi	Total		18	4	0	0	—		0	0	18	4
Dinaz Vyshhorod	2020–21	Ukrainian Second League	11	9	2	0	—		0	0	13	9
Desna Chernihiv	2020–21	Ukrainian Premier League	8	1	0	0	—		0	0	8	1
Dinaz Vyshhorod	2021–22	Ukrainian Second League	18	10	1	0	—		0	0	19	10
Zhetysu	2022	Kazakhstan First League	10	6	2	0	—		0	0	12	6
Odra Wodzisław Śląski	2022–23	III liga	6	1	—		—		—		6	1
Bukovyna Chernivtsi	2022–23	Ukrainian First League	4	0	0	0	—		0	0	4	0
Kudrivka	2023–24	Ukrainian Second League	14	4	3	0	—		0	0	17	4
Nyva Buzova	2023–24	Ukrainian First League	5	0	0	0	—		0	0	5	0
Dinaz Vyshhorod	2024–25	Ukrainian First League	11	1	1	0	—		0	0	12	1
Career total			413	105	29	2	0	0	0	0	442	107

== Honours ==
Liviv

- Ukrainian First League: 2007–08

Desna Chernihiv

- Ukrainian Second League: 2012–13

Oleksandriya

- Ukrainian First League: 2014–15

Kalynivka

- Kyiv Oblast championshipː 2024–25
- Kyiv Oblast Cup: 2024–25

Individual

- Desna Chernihiv Player of the Year: 2014, 2016
- Ukrainian First League Player of the Month: 2017–18, round 8
- Ukrainian Second League Player of the Week: 2020–21, round 4, 2021–22, round 5, 2021–22, round 13,
