= Oleh Lutsenko =

Ukrainian footballer

Personal information
- Full name: Oleh Oleksandrovych Lutsenko
- Date of birth: 14 February 1993 (age 33)
- Place of birth: Lubny, Ukraine
- Height: 1.86 m (6 ft 1 in)
- Position: Defender

Youth career
- 2006–2010: Molod Poltava
- 2010: Vorskla Poltava

Senior career*
Years	Team	Apps	(Gls)
2011	Shakhtar-3 Donetsk	1	(0)
2011–2012	Metalist Kharkiv	0	(0)
2012–2013	Volyn Lutsk	0	(0)
2013–2016	Chornomorets Odesa	2	(0)
2015	→ Hirnyk Kryvyi Rih (loan)	9	(0)
2015–2016	Desna Chernihiv	4	(0)
2016–2017	Gagra	29	(0)
2017–2018	Hirnyk-Sport Horishni Plavni	7	(0)
2018	Mykolaiv	4	(0)
2018	→ Mykolaiv-2	2	(0)
2018–2019	Merani Martvili	14	(0)
2019–2020	Lokomotiv Yerevan	32	(4)
2021	Rubikon Kyiv	10	(0)
2021	Olimpik Donetsk	1	(0)
2021	Rubikon Kyiv	6	(0)
- * Club domestic league appearances and goals as of 7 February 2023

Oleh Oleksandrovych Lutsenko (Ukrainian: Олег Олександрович Луценко; born 14 February 1993) is a Ukrainian professional footballer who plays as a defender.

Lutsenko is а product of youth team system of FC Molod Poltava. Made his debut for FC Chornomorets in the game against FC Dynamo Kyiv on 4 April 2015 in the Ukrainian Premier League.
