= Denys Favorov =

Ukrainian footballer (born 1991)

Denys Favorov Денис Фаворов
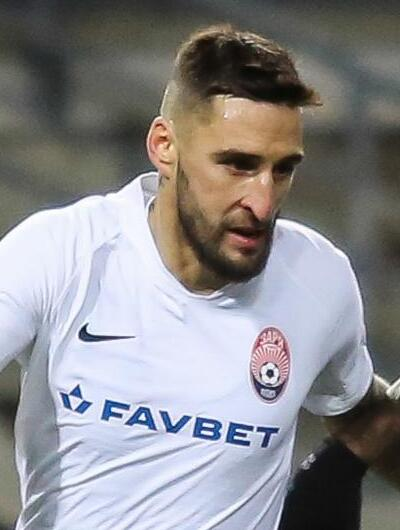
- Favorow with Zorya Luhansk in 2021

Personal information
- Full name: Denys Volodymyrovych Favorov
- Date of birth: 1 April 1991 (age 35)
- Place of birth: Kyiv, Ukrainian SSR
- Height: 1.84 m (6 ft 0 in)
- Position: Defender

Team information
- Current team: Wieczysta Kraków II (assistant)

Youth career
- 2004–2005: Dynamo Kyiv
- 2005–2007: Vidradnyi Kyiv
- 2007–2008: Arsenal Kyiv

Senior career*
Years	Team	Apps	(Gls)
2008–2013	Arsenal Kyiv	0	(0)
2011–2012	→ Slavutych Cherkasy (loan)	31	(1)
2013	Poltava	11	(0)
2014	Cherkaskyi Dnipro	23	(3)
2015	Poltava	23	(6)
2016–2020	Desna Chernihiv	130	(37)
2020–2022	Zorya Luhansk	36	(3)
2022–2024	Wieczysta Kraków	59	(14)
2025	Kotwica Kołobrzeg	9	(1)
Total		322	(65)
- * Club domestic league appearances and goals

Denys Volodymyrovych Favorov (Ukrainian: Денис Володимирович Фаворов; born 1 April 1991) is a Ukrainian former professional footballer who played as a defender. He currently works as an assistant coach of III liga club Wieczysta Kraków II.

== Career ==
=== Cherkaskyi Dnipro ===
In 2014, he played for Cherkaskyi Dnipro.

=== Desna Chernihiv ===
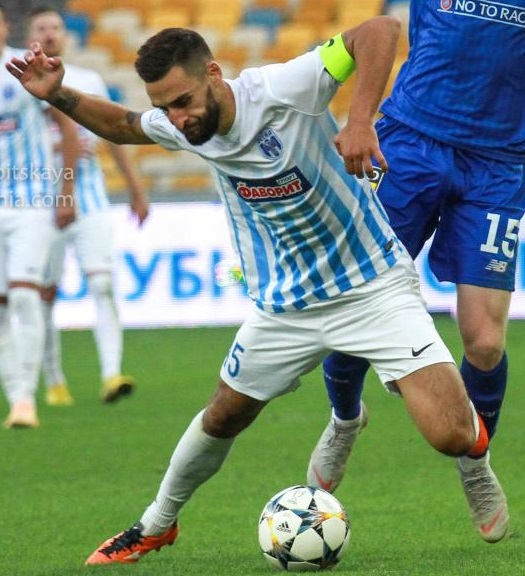
Denys Favorov with Desna Chernihiv

In March 2016, he signed a one-and-a-half-year contract with Ukrainian First League club Desna Chernihiv. In Chernihiv, he soon became one of the leaders of the team. In week 3 of the 2016–17 Ukrainian First League season, he was voted Player of the Week.

On 13 July 2017, Favorov signed a new contract with Desna for a period of three years. With Desna, he was promoted to the Ukrainian Premier League in the 2017–18 season.

In the 2018–19 season, Favorov finished with 15 goals in all competitions, making him the team's top scorer and earning him Player of the Year honours.

During the 2019–20 Ukrainian First League play-offs, he scored a penalty in a 2–0 away win against Kolos Kovalivka. On 5 July 2020, he scored two goals against Kolos Kovalivka on his way to Play of the Week plaudits.

These efforts earned Desna a place in the 2020–21 UEFA Europa League third qualifying round for the first time in club history.

Favarov was included in the Best IX squad for the 2019–20 Ukrainian Premier League.

=== Zorya Luhansk ===
On 9 August 2020, Favorov signed a two-year contract with Zorya Luhansk in the Ukrainian Premier League. On 22 August, he scored his first goal for the new club against Desna Chernihiv at the Stadion Yuri Gagarin in Chernihiv in the first match of the 2019–20 Ukrainian Premier League.

On 22 October 2020, he made his debut in the 2020–21 UEFA Europa League against Leicester City at the King Power Stadium. On 3 December, he provided the assist for Allahyar Sayyadmanesh's winning goal against Leicester in the return fixture at Slavutych-Arena. On 17 April 2021, he scored in a 2–4 league loss to Vorskla Poltava.

=== Wieczysta Kraków ===
On 2 August 2022, he signed a two-year contract with Polish III liga side Wieczysta Kraków. On 6 August, he played his first match with the new club against Ostrowiec. On 24 September, he scored his first goal for Wieczysta against Unia Tarnów.

Favorow featured regularly for Wieczysta, as the won group IV of the III liga in mid-2024 and won promotion to the third division. Shortly after, on 8 June 2024, it was announced Favorow would leave the club at the end of the month.

=== Kotwica Kołobrzeg ===
On 14 March 2025, he signed a contract with Kotwica Kołobrzeg in I liga. On 22 June 2025, he left the club along with the entire Kotwica roster.

== Coaching career ==
In August 2025, Favorov founded the Wolves Kraków academy. In March 2026, he returned to Wieczysta Kraków as an assistant at their under-19 team. In July 2026, he was moved to the reserve team to operate in the same role.

== Personal life ==
His younger brother Artem Favorov is also a professional footballer.

== Career statistics ==
Appearances and goals by club, season and competition
Club	Season	League			National cup (Note: Includes Ukrainian Cup, Polish Cup)		Europe		Total	
Club	Season	Division	Apps	Goals	Apps	Goals	Apps	Goals	Apps	Goals
Poltava	2013–14	Ukrainian First League	11	0	0	0	—		11	0
Cherkaskyi Dnipro	2013–14	Ukrainian Second League	8	2	0	0	—		8	2
Cherkaskyi Dnipro	2014–15	Ukrainian Second League	15	1	0	0	—		15	1
Cherkaskyi Dnipro	Total		23	3	0	0	—		23	3
Poltava	2014–15	Ukrainian First League	6	2	0	0	—		6	2
Poltava	2015–16	Ukrainian First League	17	4	0	0	—		17	4
Poltava	Total		23	6	0	0	—		23	6
Desna Chernihiv	2015–16	Ukrainian First League	11	3	0	0	—		11	3
Desna Chernihiv	2016–17	Ukrainian First League	30	5	3	1	—		33	6
Desna Chernihiv	2017–18	Ukrainian First League	27	15	2	1	—		29	16
Desna Chernihiv	2018–19	Ukrainian Premier League	31	6	2	1	—		33	7
Desna Chernihiv	2019–20	Ukrainian Premier League	31	8	2	0	—		33	8
Desna Chernihiv	Total		130	37	9	3	—		139	40
Zorya Luhansk	2020–21	Ukrainian Premier League	20	2	3	0	6 (Note: Appearances in UEFA Europa League)	0	29	2
Zorya Luhansk	2021–22	Ukrainian Premier League	16	1	1	0	7	0	24	1
Zorya Luhansk	Total		36	3	4	0	13	0	53	3
Wieczysta Kraków	2022–23	III liga, gr. IV	29	5	1	0	—		30	5
Wieczysta Kraków	2023–24	III liga, gr. IV	30	9	1	0	—		31	9
Wieczysta Kraków	Total		59	14	2	0	—		62	14
Kotwica Kołobrzeg	2024–25	I liga	9	1	—		—		9	1
Career total			291	64	15	3	13	0	319	67

== Honours ==
Desna Chernihiv

- Ukrainian First League: 2017–18

Zorya Luhansk

- Ukrainian Cup runner-up: 2020–21

Wieczysta Kraków

- III liga, group IV: 2023–24
- Polish Cup (Lesser Poland regionals): 2022–23

Individual

- Ukrainian Footballer of the Year: 2020
- Desna Chernihiv Player of the Year: 2018–19
- Ukrainian First League Best Player: 2017–18

Preceded by Vadym Melnyk	Captain of Desna Chernihiv; 2018-2020	Succeeded by Vladyslav Ohirya
