= Oleh Shevchenko (footballer, born 1988) =

Ukrainian footballer

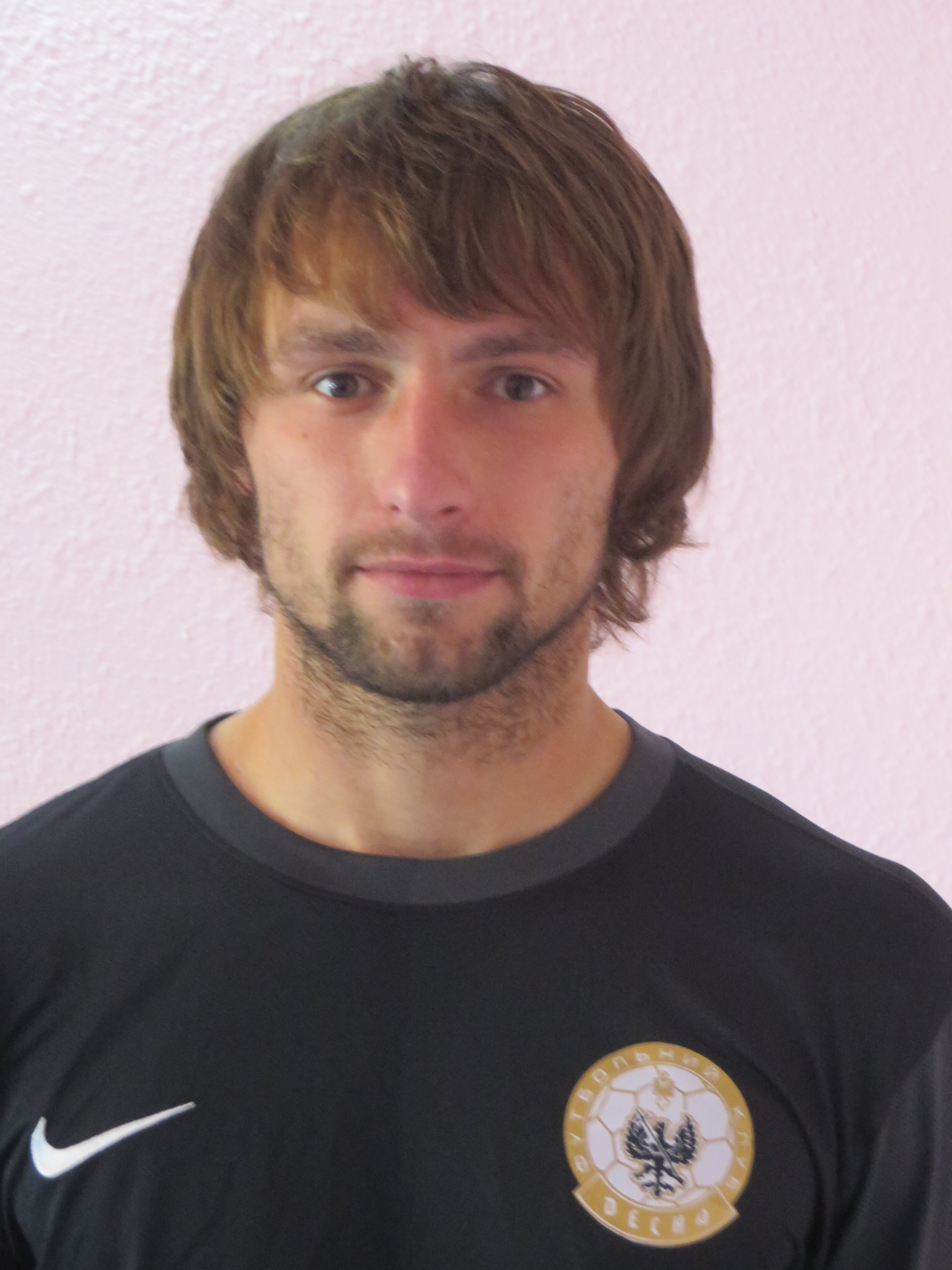

Personal information
- Full name: Oleg Yevhenovych Shevchenko
- Date of birth: 23 April 1988 (age 38)
- Place of birth: Ukrainian SSR
- Height: 1.90 m (6 ft 3 in)
- Position: Goalkeeper

Youth career
- Slavutych

Senior career*
Years	Team	Apps	(Gls)
2007–2009	Yednist-2 Plysky	6	(0)
2009–2013	Yednist Plysky	35	(0)
2013–2017	Desna Chernihiv	22	(0)
2017–2018	Polissya Zhytomyr	16	(0)
2018–2019	Avanhard Koryukivka	10	(0)
2010–2020	Agrodim	20	(0)
2020–2021	FC Nyva Terebovlya	10	(0)
2021–2022	Kalynivka	12	(0)

Managerial career
- 2022–2023: Zviahel (goalkeeping coach)
- 2023–2024: Nyva Buzova (goalkeeping coach)
- 2023–2024: Kudrivka (goalkeeping coach)
- 2024–2025: Livyi Bereh Kyiv U17 (coach)
- 2025–2026: Livyi Bereh-2 Kyiv (goalkeeping coach)
- 2026–: Livyi Bereh Kyiv U21 (goalkeeping coach)
- * Club domestic league appearances and goals as of 19 August 2026

Oleg Yevhenovych Shevchenko (Ukrainian: Оле́г Євге́нович Шевче́нко; born 23 April 1988) is a Ukrainian professional football goalkeeper who played for Desna Chernihiv.

== Career ==
Oleg Shevchenko having started his career with Slavutych, the first coach was Salei Oleksandr Mikhailovich. In 2008 he moved to Yednist Plysky, where he stayed until 2013 and he played 35 matches. In 2009 he played for Yednist Plysky 2 and he won the Ukrainian Football Amateur League. In the 2009–10 season, he took part in the team of Yednist Plysky getting into the 1/8 round of the Ukrainian Cup against Shakhtar Donetsk. In the 2010–11 season, he played for the amateur football club Yednist Plysky 2 at the Chernihiv Oblast Football Cup. In 2013 he moved to Desna Chernihiv, the main club of the city of Chernihiv, here he played until the end of 2017. In 2018 he moved to Polissya Zhytomyr in Ukrainian Second League.

== Honours ==
Desna Chernihiv

- Ukrainian First League: 2017–18
- Ukrainian First League: Runner-Up 2016–17

Yednist Plysky 2

- Ukrainian Football Amateur League: 2009
- Ukrainian Football Amateur League: Runner-Up 2007
