= Anton Kramar =

Ukrainian footballer (born 1988)

Personal information
- Full name: Anton Ihorovych Kramar
- Date of birth: 5 February 1988 (age 38)
- Place of birth: Smila, Ukrainian SSR, Soviet Union
- Height: 1.82 m (5 ft 11 1/2 in)
- Position: Midfielder

Youth career
- –2005: Sportive School Olimp Smila

Senior career*
Years	Team	Apps	(Gls)
2005–2009	FC Dnipro Cherkasy	80	(8)
2007	→FC Dnipro-2 Cherkasy	4	(0)
2009–2010	FC Arsenal Bila Tserkva	15	(1)
2010–2011	FC Lviv	33	(8)
2011–2013	FC Sevastopol	42	(2)
2012	→FC Bukovyna Chernivtsi	11	(0)
2012	→FC Sevastopol-2	1	(0)
2014	FC Desna Chernihiv	10	(0)
2014	FC Zirka Kirovohrad	6	(0)
2015	FC Desna Chernihiv	8	(2)
2016	FC Hirnyk Kryvyi Rih	11	(2)
2016–2018	FC Cherkaskyi Dnipro	49	(4)
- * Club domestic league appearances and goals as of 5 December 2019

Anton Kramar (Ukrainian: Антон Ігорович Крамар; born 5 February 1988) is a professional Ukrainian football retired midfielder.

== Playing career ==
Kramar is the product of the Sportive School Olimp in Smila. His first coach was V. Nahornyi.

He signed a contract with FC Lviv and made his debut in the match against FC Feniks-Illichovets Kalinine on 17 July 2010, scoring one goal.

== Singing career ==
After Kramar's contract with FC Cherkaskyi Dnipro expired in June 2018, he began to pursue his singing career and in December 2019 released his first single "Ми все розуміємо" (We understand everything).
