= Oleksandr Derebchynskyi =

Ukrainian footballer

Personal information
- Full name: Деребчинський Олександр Борисович
- Date of birth: 7 May 1991 (age 35)
- Place of birth: Odesa, Ukrainian SSR, USSR
- Height: 1.84 m (6 ft 0 in)
- Position: Forward

Senior career*
Years	Team	Apps	(Gls)
2012–2013	Krymteplytsia Molodizhne	7	(0)
2013–2014	Bukovyna Chernivtsi	13	(0)
2013–2015	Desna Chernihiv	32	(6)
2015–2017	Zirka Kropyvnytskyi	15	(1)
2017	Kolkheti-1913 Poti	14	(6)
2018–2019	Obolon Kyiv	18	(1)
2020–2021	Chaika Petropavlivska Borshchahivka	1	(0)
- * Club domestic league appearances and goals as of 24 November 2021

Oleksandr Derebchynskyi (Ukrainian: Деребчинский Александр Борисович) is a Ukraine football player.

== Career ==
Oleksandr Derebchynskyi started his career in 2012 with Krymteplytsia Molodizhne for one season where he played 7 matches. In summer 2013 he moved to Bukovyna Chernivtsi for one season where he played 13 matches. Then he moved to Desna Chernihiv the main club of Chernihiv, here he stayed two season where he manage to play 32 matches and scored 6 goals. In summer 2015 he moved to Zirka Kropyvnytskyi where he played 15 matches and scored 1 goal against Ternopil. 2017 he moved to Kolkheti-1913 Poti a football club in Georgia, here he played 14 matches and scoring 6 goals. In 2018 he returned to Ukraine in the side of Obolon Kyiv, where he played 18 matches and scoring 1 goal. In 2021 he played 1 match with SC Chaika in Ukrainian Second League.

== Honours ==
Zirka Kropyvnytskyi

- Ukrainian First League 2015–16

Desna Chernihiv

- Ukrainian Second League 2012–13
