= Oleh Leonidov =

Ukrainian footballer (born 1985)

Personal information
- Full name: Oleh Anatoliyovych Leonidov
- Date of birth: 16 August 1985 (age 41)
- Place of birth: Dnipropetrovsk, Ukrainian SSR, Soviet Union
- Height: 1.80 m (5 ft 11 in)
- Position: Defender

Senior career*
Years	Team	Apps	(Gls)
2004–2005	Elektrometalurh-NZF Nikopol	18	(0)
2006	PFC Sevastopol	1	(0)
2006	Alvita Sevastopol		
2007	Enerhiya Yuzhnoukrainsk	21	(0)
2008–2011	FC Lviv	37	(0)
2011–2012	Obolon Kyiv	8	(0)
2012	Naftovyk-Ukrnafta Okhtyrka	10	(0)
2012–2013	MFC Mykolaiv	16	(0)
2013–2014	Sumy	13	(1)
2014–2015	Desna Chernihiv	5	(0)
2015–2016	Kolos Kovalivka	5	(0)
2016–2017	Poltava	9	(0)
- * Club domestic league appearances and goals as of 8 December 2021

Oleh Anatoliyovych Leonidov (Ukrainian: Олег Анатолійович Леонідов; born 16 August 1985) is a professional Ukrainian football defender.

== Honours ==
Kolos Kovalivka

- Ukrainian Second League: 2015–16
