= 2016–17 FC Desna Chernihiv season =

FC Desna Chernihiv
2016–17 season
- President: Volodymyr Levin
- Manager: Oleksandr Ryabokon
- Stadium: Chernihiv Stadium
- Ukrainian First League: 2nd
- Ukrainian Cup: Round of 16 (1/8)
- Top goalscorer: League: Oleksandr Filippov (11); All: Oleksandr Filippov (11)
| Home colours | Away colours |

The 2016–17 season the club competed in the Ukrainian First League and Ukrainian Cup.

== Players ==
=== Squad information ===
As of 31 May 2019

| Squad no. | Name | Nationality | Position | Date of birth (age) |
Goalkeepers
| | Kostyantyn Makhnovskyi | (Ukraine) | GK | 1 January 1989 (aged 30) |
| | Oleh Shevchenko | (Ukraine) | GK | 5 June 1988 (aged 30) |
Defenders
| 3 | Temur Partsvania | (Ukraine) (Georgia (country)) | DF | 6 July 1991 (aged 27) |
| 17 | Andriy Hitchenko | (Ukraine) | DF | 2 October 1984 (aged 34) |
| 21 | Serhiy Lyulka | (Ukraine) | DF | 22 February 1990 (aged 29) |
| 23 | Dmytro Nyemchaninov | (Ukraine) | DF | 27 January 1990 (aged 29) |
| 32 | Maksym Imerekov | (Ukraine) | DF | 23 January 1991 (aged 28) |
| 33 | Andriy Slinkin | (Ukraine) | DF | 19 February 1991 (aged 28) |
| 45 | Denys Favorov (Captain) | (Ukraine) | DF | 1 April 1991 (aged 28) |
Midfielders
| 7 | Vladyslav Ohirya | (Ukraine) | MF | 3 April 1990 (aged 29) |
| 12 | Yehor Kartushov | (Ukraine) | MF | 5 January 1991 (aged 28) |
| 14 | Andriy Yakymiv ^{List B} | (Ukraine) | MF | 15 June 1997 (aged 21) |
| 15 | Renat Mochulyak ^{List B} | (Ukraine) | MF | 15 February 1998 (aged 21) |
| 16 | Yevheniy Belych ^{List B} | (Ukraine) | MF | 9 January 2001 (aged 18) |
| 18 | Mykhaylo Kozak | (Ukraine) | MF | 20 January 1991 (aged 28) |
| 19 | Artem Favorov | (Ukraine) | MF | 19 March 1994 (aged 25) |
| 22 | Andriy Mostovyi | (Ukraine) | MF | 24 January 1988 (aged 31) |
| 27 | Serhiy Starenkyi | (Ukraine) | MF | 20 September 1984 (aged 34) |
| 79 | Mykhaylo Serhiychuk | (Ukraine) | MF | 29 July 1991 (aged 27) |
| 89 | Oleksandr Volkov | (Ukraine) | MF | 7 February 1989 (aged 30) |
| 90 | Andriy Bohdanov | (Ukraine) | MF | 21 January 1990 (aged 29) |
Forwards
| 9 | Dmytro Khlyobas | (Ukraine) | FW | 9 May 1994 (aged 25) |
| 10 | Oleksandr Filippov | (Ukraine) | FW | 23 October 1992 (aged 26) |
| 20 | Denys Bezborodko (on loan from Shakhtar Donetsk) | (Ukraine) | FW | 31 May 1994 (aged 25) |

== Transfers ==
=== In ===
| Date | Pos. | Player | Age | Moving from | Type | Fee | Source |
Summer
| 15 July 2016 | FW | (Ukraine) Oleksandr Volkov | 26 | (Ukraine) Olimpik Donetsk | Transfer | Free | |
| 15 July 2016 | DF | (Ukraine) Denys Halenkov | 38 | (Ukraine) Olimpik Donetsk | On Loan | Free | |
| 8 July 2016 | DF | (Ukraine) Andriy Mostovyi | 38 | (Ukraine) Zirka Kropyvnytskyi | Transfer | Free | |
| 8 July 2016 | FW | (Ukraine) Oleksandr Filippov | 25 | (Ukraine) Avanhard Kramatorsk | Transfer | Free | |
| 8 July 2016 | MF | (Ukraine) Vyacheslav Akimov | 38 | (Ukraine) Illichivets Mariupol | Transfer | Free | |
Winter
| 10 February 2017 | MF | (Ukraine) Volodymyr Lysenko | 24 | (Ukraine) Olimpik Donetsk | Transfer | Free | |
| 2 March 2017 | MF | (Ukraine) Maksym Banasevych | 24 | (Ukraine) Zorya Luhansk | Transfer | Free | |
| 2 March 2017 | MF | (Georgia (country)) Levan Arveladze | 24 | (Ukraine) Naftovyk-Ukrnafta | Transfer | Free | |

=== Out ===
| Date | Pos. | Player | Age | Moving to | Type | Fee | Source |
Summer
| 2 September 2016 | DF | (Ukraine) Maksym Leshchenko | 24 | (Ukraine) Poltava | Transfer | Free | |
| 20 July 2016 | GK | (Ukraine) Bohdan Kohut | 24 | (Ukraine) Veres Rivne | Transfer | Free | |
| 20 July 2016 | DF | (Ukraine) Vadym Malyuk | 23 | (Ukraine) Yednist Plysky | Transfer | Free | |
| 20 July 2016 | DF | (Ukraine) Oleksandr Iosha | 20 | (Ukraine) Nyva Vinnytsia | Transfer | Free | |
| 20 July 2016 | MF | (Ukraine) Dmytro Zaderetskyi | 24 | (Ukraine) Volyn Lutsk | Loan Return | Free | |
| 20 July 2016 | MF | (Ukraine) Rudolf Sukhomlynov | 24 | (Georgia (country)) Odishi 1919 | On Loan | Free | |
Winter
| 10 February 2017 | GK | (Ukraine) Oleh Shevchenko | 24 | (Ukraine) Polissya Zhytomyr | Transfer | Free | |
| 10 February 2017 | MF | (Ukraine) Artem Gryshchenko | 24 | (Ukraine) Avanhard Koryukivka | Transfer | Free | |

== Statistics ==
=== Appearances and goals ===
| No. | Pos | Nat | Player | Total | | Premier League | | Cup | |
| No. | Pos | Nat | Player | Apps | Goals | Apps | Goals | Apps | Goals |
Goalkeepers
| | GK | (Ukraine) UKR | Kostyantyn Makhnovskyi | 31 | 0 | 31 | 0 | 0 | 0 |
| | GK | (Ukraine) UKR | Oleh Shevchenko | 3 | 0 | 3 | 0 | 0 | 0 |
| | GK | (Ukraine) UKR | Serhiy Melashenko | 0 | 0 | 0 | 0 | 0 | 0 |
Defenders
| | DF | (Ukraine) UKR | Vadym Melnyk | 29 | 6 | 29 | 6 | 0 | 0 |
| | DF | (Ukraine) UKR | Anton Bratkov | 3 | 0 | 3 | 0 | 0 | 0 |
| | DF | (Ukraine) UKR | Andriy Mostovyi | 32 | 1 | 32 | 1 | 0 | 0 |
| | DF | (Ukraine) UKR | Ihor Soldat | 7 | 0 | 7 | 0 | 0 | 0 |
| | DF | (Ukraine) UKR | Maksym Maksymenko | 26 | 2 | 26 | 2 | 0 | 0 |
| | DF | (Ukraine) UKR | Rudolf Sukhomlynov | 3 | 0 | 3 | 0 | 0 | 0 |
| | DF | (Ukraine) UKR | Oleksandr Holovko | 26 | 2 | 26 | 2 | 0 | 0 |
Midfielders
| | MF | (Ukraine) UKR | Artem Favorov | 13 | 1 | 12 | 1 | 1 | 0 |
| | MF | (Ukraine) UKR | Vadym Bovtruk | 21 | 1 | 21 | 1 | 0 | 0 |
| | MF | (Ukraine) UKR | Pavlo Shchedrakov | 23 | 0 | 23 | 0 | 0 | 0 |
| | MF | (Georgia (country)) GEO | Levan Arveladze | 12 | 4 | 12 | 4 | 0 | 0 |
| | MF | (Georgia (country)) GEO | Luka Koberidze | 26 | 1 | 26 | 1 | 0 | 0 |
| | MF | (Ukraine) UKR | Illya Kovalenko | 8 | 2 | 8 | 2 | 0 | 0 |
| | MF | (Ukraine) UKR | Ihor Kirienko | 12 | 1 | 12 | 1 | 0 | 0 |
| | MF | (Ukraine) UKR | Denys Favorov | 30 | 5 | 30 | 5 | 0 | 0 |
| | MF | (Ukraine) UKR | Maksym Banasevych | 18 | 3 | 18 | 3 | 0 | 0 |
| | MF | (Ukraine) UKR | Bohdan Myshenko | 11 | 0 | 11 | 0 | 0 | 0 |
| | MF | (Ukraine) UKR | Vyacheslav Akimov | 3 | 0 | 3 | 0 | 0 | 0 |
| | MF | (Ukraine) UKR | Artem Gryshchenko | 2 | 0 | 2 | 0 | 0 | 0 |
Forwards
| | MF | (Ukraine) UKR | Oleksandr Volkov | 28 | 4 | 28 | 4 | 0 | 0 |
| | FW | (Ukraine) UKR | Denys Halenkov | 7 | 0 | 7 | 0 | 0 | 0 |
| | FW | (Ukraine) UKR | Oleksandr Filippov | 23 | 11 | 23 | 11 | 0 | 0 |
| | FW | (Ukraine) UKR | Volodymyr Lysenko | 10 | 4 | 10 | 4 | 0 | 0 |
| | FW | (Ukraine) UKR | Yevhen Chepurnenko | 26 | 6 | 26 | 6 | 0 | 0 |
| | FW | (Ukraine) UKR | Yehor Kartushov | 34 | 4 | 34 | 4 | 0 | 0 |
Players transferred out during the season
| | GK | (Ukraine) UKR | Oleh Shevchenko | 3 | 0 | 3 | 0 | 0 | 0 |
| | DF | (Ukraine) UKR | Maksym Leshchenko | 0 | 0 | 0 | 0 | 0 | 0 |
| | MF | (Ukraine) UKR | Artem Gryshchenko | 2 | 0 | 2 | 0 | 0 | 0 |

Source: Competitions

Last updated: 31 May 2019

=== Goalscorers ===
| Rank | No. | Pos | Nat | Name | Premier League | Cup | Europa League | Total |
|---|---|---|---|---|---|---|---|---|
| 1 | | FW | (Ukraine) | Oleksandr Filippov | 11 | 1 | 0 | 12 |
| 2 | | DF | (Ukraine) | Vadym Melnyk | 6 | 0 | 0 | 6 |
| 2 | | FW | (Ukraine) | Yevhen Chepurnenko | 6 | 0 | 0 | 6 |
| 2 | | MF | (Ukraine) | Denys Favorov | 5 | 1 | 0 | 6 |
| 4 | | MF | (Georgia (country)) | Levan Arveladze | 4 | 0 | 0 | 4 |
| 4 | | FW | (Ukraine) | Oleksandr Volkov | 4 | 0 | 0 | 4 |
| 4 | | FW | (Ukraine) | Volodymyr Lysenko | 4 | 0 | 0 | 4 |
| 4 | | FW | (Ukraine) | Yehor Kartushov | 4 | 0 | 0 | 4 |
| 5 | | MF | (Ukraine) | Maksym Banasevych | 3 | 0 | 0 | 3 |
| 6 | | DF | (Ukraine) | Maksym Maksymenko | 2 | 0 | 0 | 2 |
| 6 | | MF | (Ukraine) | Illya Kovalenko | 2 | 0 | 0 | 2 |
| 7 | | MF | (Ukraine) | Artem Favorov | 1 | 0 | 0 | 1 |
| 7 | | MF | (Ukraine) | Vadym Bovtruk | 1 | 0 | 0 | 1 |
| 7 | | MF | (Georgia (country)) | Luka Koberidze | 1 | 0 | 0 | 1 |
| 7 | | MF | (Ukraine) | Ihor Kirienko | 1 | 0 | 0 | 1 |
| | | | | Total | 55 | 2 | 0 | 57 |

Last updated: 31 May 2019
