= 2018–19 FC Desna Chernihiv season =

FC Desna Chernihiv
2018–19 season
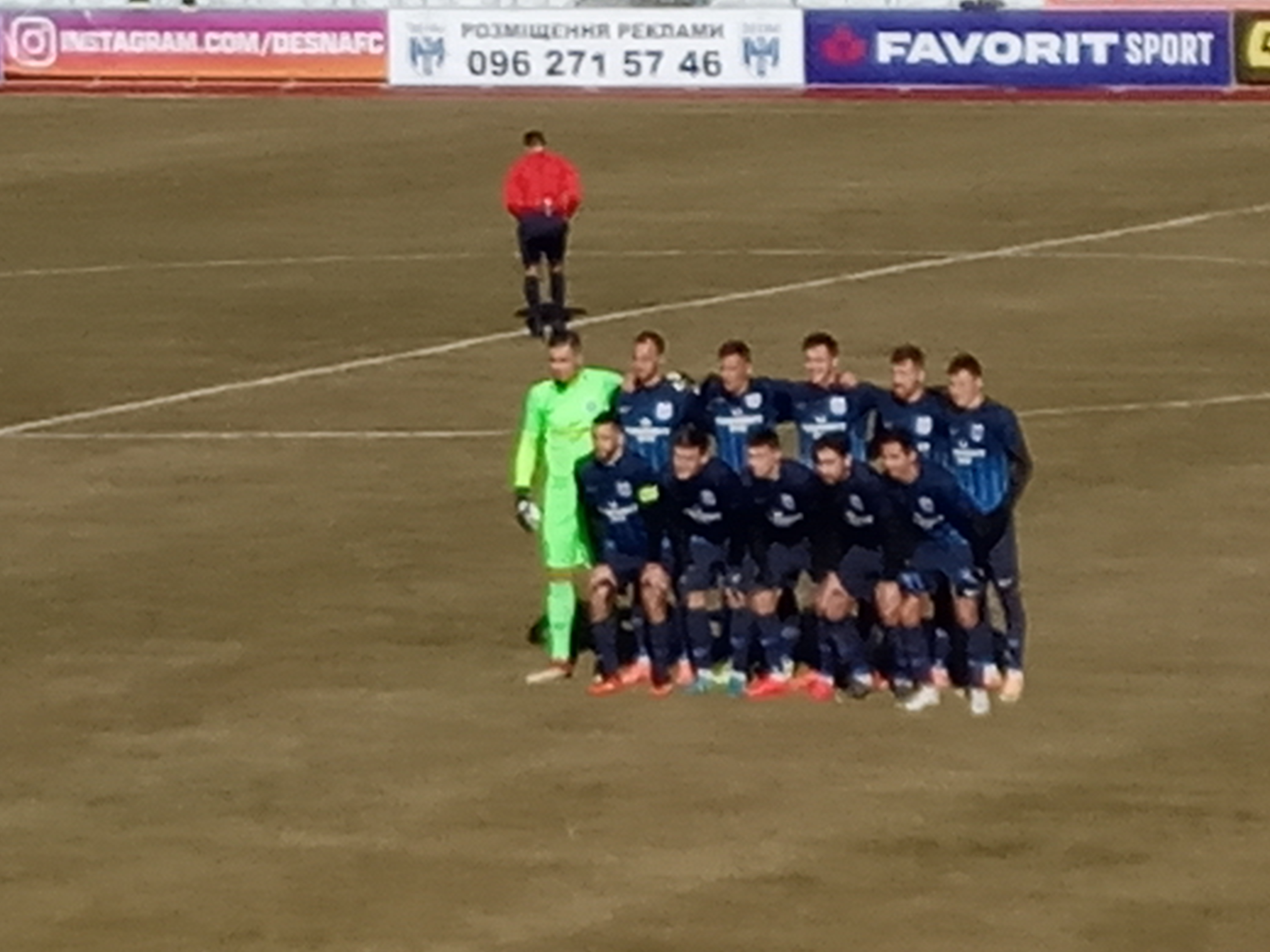
- President: Volodymyr Levin
- Manager: Oleksandr Ryabokon
- Stadium: Chernihiv Stadium
- Ukrainian Premier League: 8th
- Ukrainian Cup: Round of 16 (1/8)
- Top goalscorer: League: Denys Favorov (7); All: Denys Favorov (8)
Home colours	Away colours

The 2018–19 season was first season in the Ukrainian Premier League for FC Desna Chernihiv. Desna also competed in the Ukrainian Cup.

== Players ==
=== Squad information ===
As of 31 May 2019

Squad no.	Name	Nationality	Position	Date of birth (age)
Goalkeepers
28	Maksym Tatarenko ^{List B}	(Ukraine)	GK	7 May 1999 (aged 20)
44	Yevhen Past	(Ukraine)	GK	16 March 1988 (aged 31)
72	Ihor Lytovka	(Ukraine)	GK	5 June 1988 (aged 30)
Defenders
3	Temur Partsvania	(Ukraine) (Georgia (country))	DF	6 July 1991 (aged 27)
17	Andriy Hitchenko	(Ukraine)	DF	2 October 1984 (aged 34)
21	Serhiy Lyulka	(Ukraine)	DF	22 February 1990 (aged 29)
23	Dmytro Nyemchaninov	(Ukraine)	DF	27 January 1990 (aged 29)
32	Maksym Imerekov	(Ukraine)	DF	23 January 1991 (aged 28)
33	Andriy Slinkin	(Ukraine)	DF	19 February 1991 (aged 28)
45	Denys Favorov (Captain)	(Ukraine)	DF	1 April 1991 (aged 28)
Midfielders
7	Vladyslav Ohirya	(Ukraine)	MF	3 April 1990 (aged 29)
12	Yehor Kartushov	(Ukraine)	MF	5 January 1991 (aged 28)
14	Andriy Yakymiv ^{List B}	(Ukraine)	MF	15 June 1997 (aged 21)
15	Renat Mochulyak ^{List B}	(Ukraine)	MF	15 February 1998 (aged 21)
16	Yevheniy Belych ^{List B}	(Ukraine)	MF	9 January 2001 (aged 18)
18	Mykhaylo Kozak	(Ukraine)	MF	20 January 1991 (aged 28)
19	Artem Favorov	(Ukraine)	MF	19 March 1994 (aged 25)
22	Andriy Mostovyi	(Ukraine)	MF	24 January 1988 (aged 31)
27	Serhiy Starenkyi	(Ukraine)	MF	20 September 1984 (aged 34)
79	Mykhaylo Serhiychuk	(Ukraine)	MF	29 July 1991 (aged 27)
89	Oleksandr Volkov	(Ukraine)	MF	7 February 1989 (aged 30)
90	Andriy Bohdanov	(Ukraine)	MF	21 January 1990 (aged 29)
Forwards
9	Dmytro Khlyobas	(Ukraine)	FW	9 May 1994 (aged 25)
10	Oleksandr Filippov	(Ukraine)	FW	23 October 1992 (aged 26)
20	Denys Bezborodko (on loan from Shakhtar Donetsk)	(Ukraine)	FW	31 May 1994 (aged 25)

== Transfers ==
=== In ===
Date	Pos.	Player	Age	Moving from	Type	Fee	Source
Summer
8 June 2018	GK	(Ukraine) Yevhen Past	30	(Ukraine) Zirka Kropyvnytskyi	Transfer	Free	
12 June 2018	DF	(Ukraine) Andriy Hitchenko	33	(Ukraine) FC Oleksandriya	Transfer	Free	
15 June 2018	DF	(Ukraine) Serhiy Lyulka	28	(Ukraine) Chornomorets Odesa	Transfer	Free	
21 June 2018	DF	(Ukraine) Anton Bratkov	25	(Ukraine) Zirka Kropyvnytskyi	Transfer	Free	
23 June 2018	MF	(Ukraine) Serhiy Starenkyi	33	(Ukraine) FC Oleksandriya	Transfer	Free	
23 June 2018	MF	(Ukraine) Ruslan Kisil	26	(Ukraine) Olimpik Donetsk	Transfer	Free	
24 June 2018	MF	(Ukraine) Yevheniy Belych	17	(Ukraine) Desna U-17	Transfer	Free	
11 July 2018	FW	(Ukraine) Dmytro Khlyobas	24	(Ukraine) Dynamo Kyiv	Transfer	Free	
11 July 2018	FW	(Ukraine) Oleksandr Kovpak	35	(Ukraine) FC Poltava	Transfer	Free	
23 July 2018	MF	(Ukraine) Andriy Yakymiv	21	(Ukraine) Stal Kamianske	Transfer	Free	
23 July 2018	FW	(Ukraine) Oleksandr Sharylo	20	(Ukraine) Vorskla Poltava	Transfer	Free	
20 September 2018	DF	(Ukraine) Maksym Imerekov	27	(Cyprus) Ermis Aradippou	Transfer	Free	
20 September 2018	FW	(Ukraine) Roman Vovk	22	(Ukraine) Fakel Lipovets	Transfer	Free	
31 May 2018	GK	(Ukraine) Oleh Shevchenko	30	(Ukraine) Polissya Zhytomyr	Loan return		
31 May 2018	MF	(Ukraine) Vadym Bovtruk	26	(Ukraine) Polissya Zhytomyr	Loan return		
31 May 2018	MF	(Ukraine) Illya Kovalenko	28	(Ukraine) PFC Sumy	Loan return		
31 May 2018	FW	(Ukraine) Denys Halenkov	22	(Ukraine) PFC Sumy	Loan return		
Winter
16 January 2019	MF	(Ukraine) Andriy Bohdanov	28	(Poland) Arka Gdynia	Transfer	Free	
18 January 2019	DF	(Ukraine) Dmytro Nyemchaninov	29	(Russia) Krylia Sovetov Samara	Transfer	Undisclosed	
18 January 2019	FW	(Ukraine) Mykhaylo Serhiychuk	27	(Ukraine) Vorskla Poltava	Transfer	Free	
9 February 2019	MF	(Ukraine) Mykhaylo Kozak	28	(Ukraine) Rukh Vynnyky	Transfer	Free	
20 February 2019	DF	(Ukraine) Temur Partsvania	27	(Hungary) Kisvárda	Transfer	Free	
1 March 2019	MF	(Ukraine) Renat Mochulyak	21	(Ukraine) Desna-2 Chernihiv	Transfer	Free	
31 December 2018	GK	(Ukraine) Serhii Melashenko	22	(Ukraine) FC Mynai	Loan return		

=== Out ===
Date	Pos.	Player	Age	Moving to	Type	Fee	Source
Summer
1 June 2018	GK	(Ukraine) Oleh Shevchenko	30	Unattached	Transfer	Free	
1 June 2018	DF	(Ukraine) Vadym Melnyk	38	Unattached	Transfer	Free	
1 June 2018	DF	(Ukraine) Pavlo Schedrakov	33	Retired	Transfer		
1 July 2018	MF	(Ukraine) Levan Arveladze	25	(Ukraine) Zorya Luhansk	Transfer	Free	
9 July 2018	DF	(Georgia (country)) Giorgi Gadrani	23	(Georgia (country)) Dila Gori	Transfer	Free	
9 July 2018	DF	(Ukraine) Kyrylo Sydorenko	32	Unattached	Transfer	Free	
9 July 2018	MF	(Ukraine) Yevhen Chumak	22	(Georgia (country)) Shevardeni-1906 Tbilisi	Transfer	Free	
1 September 2018	MF	(Ukraine) Ruslan Kisil	26	Unattached	Transfer	Free	
21 September 2018	FW	(Ukraine) Denys Halenkov	22	(Ukraine) Polissya Zhytomyr	Transfer	Free	
27 September 2018	DF	(Ukraine) Oleksandr Holovko	23	Unattached	Transfer	Free	
4 October 2018	MF	(Ukraine) Ruslan Kisil	26	(Ukraine) Kolos Kovalivka	Transfer	Free	
23 June 2018	MF	(Ukraine) Illya Kovalenko	28	(Ukraine) Inhulets Petrove	Loan		
18 July 2018	GK	(Ukraine) Kostyantyn Makhnovskyi	29	(Ukraine) Olimpik Donetsk	Loan		
20 July 2018	MF	(Ukraine) Vadym Bovtruk	26	(Ukraine) PFC Sumy	Loan		
27 August 2018	GK	(Ukraine) Serhii Melashenko	22	(Ukraine) FC Mynai	Loan		
Winter
1 January 2019	MF	(Georgia (country)) Luka Koberidze	24	Unattached	Transfer	Free	
1 January 2019	FW	(Ukraine) Oleksandr Kovpak	35	Unattached	Transfer	Free	
2 February 2019	DF	(Ukraine) Anton Bratkov	25	(Israel) Maccabi Petah Tikva	Transfer	Free	
1 March 2019	GK	(Ukraine) Serhii Melashenko	22	(Ukraine) Hirnyk Kryvyi Rih	Transfer	Free	
10 February 2019	FW	(Ukraine) Roman Vovk	24	(Ukraine) Desna-2 Chernihiv	Transfer	Free	
10 January 2019	DF	(Ukraine) Vitaliy Yermakov	26	(Ukraine) Avanhard Kramatorsk	Loan		
10 February 2019	MF	(Ukraine) Maksym Banasevych	24	(Ukraine) Kolos Kovalivka	Loan		

== Pre-season and friendlies ==
28 June 2018 Friendly	Desna Chernihiv (Ukraine)	0–1	(Ukraine) Olimpik Donetsk	Chernihiv
16:00 EEST (UTC+03:00)		Report	Goal	Stadium: Chernihiv Stadium; Attendance: 1,000

3 July 2018 Friendly	Desna Chernihiv (Ukraine)	1–1	(Ukraine) Obolon-Brovar Kyiv	Chernihiv
16:00 EEST (UTC+03:00)	Denys Favorov 57' (pen.)	Report	Sydorenko 22' (o.g.)	Stadium: Chernihiv Stadium

4 July 2018 Friendly	Desna Chernihiv (Ukraine)	3–2	(Ukraine) Kolos Kovalivka	Chernihiv
15:00 EEST (UTC+03:00)	Mostovyi 31'; Artem Favorov 39'; Halenkov 75'	Report	Doroshenko 49' (pen.); Zuyevych 88'	Stadium: Chernihiv Stadium; Attendance: 300

9 July 2018 Friendly	Desna Chernihiv (Ukraine)	0–0	(Ukraine) Metalist 1925 Kharkiv	Poltava
17:00 EEST (UTC+03:00)		Report		Stadium: Lokomotyv Stadium; Attendance: 60; Referee: Denys Serdyuk

13 July 2018 Friendly	SC Dnipro-1 (Ukraine)	2–2	(Ukraine) Desna Chernihiv	Dnipro
17:00 EEST (UTC+03:00)	Polyovyi 79'; Kozhushko 85'	Report	Halenkov 53'; Khlyobas 60'	Stadium: Dnipro-Arena

14 July 2018 Friendly	Desna Chernihiv (Ukraine)	3–1	(Ukraine) PFC Sumy	Poltava
15:00 EEST (UTC+03:00)	Denys Favorov; Starenkyi; Kisil	Report	Rafalskyi	Stadium: Lokomotyv Stadium

18 July 2018 Friendly	Vorskla Poltava (Ukraine)	0–1	(Ukraine) Desna Chernihiv	Poltava
16:00 EEST (UTC+03:00)		Report	Filippov 25'	Stadium: Ltava Stadium; Attendance: 100

13 October 2018 Friendly	Desna Chernihiv (Ukraine)	4–0	(Georgia (country)) Kolkheti-1913 Poti	Chernihiv
16:00 EEST (UTC+03:00)	Yakymiv 57'; Apkhazava 60' (o.g.); Filippov 75'; Bezborodko 83'	Report		Stadium: Chernihiv Stadium

16 November 2018 Friendly	Dinamo Minsk-2 (Belarus)	0–7	(Ukraine) Desna Chernihiv	Belarus
EET (UTC+02:00)		Report	Sharylo, Khlyobas; Bratkov; Vovk (o.g.); Filippov

17 November 2018 Friendly	FC Smolevichi (Belarus)	0–4	(Ukraine) Desna Chernihiv	Belarus
EET (UTC+02:00)		Report	Starenkyi; Khlyobas; Bezborodko; Filippov

20 January 2019 Friendly	Desna Chernihiv (Ukraine)	0–1	(Romania) Dunărea Călărași	Turkey
EET (UTC+02:00)		Report	Ndiaye

21 January 2019 Friendly	Desna Chernihiv (Ukraine)	1–2	(Azerbaijan) Sabail Baku	Turkey
17:30 EET (UTC+02:00)	Volkov	Report	Goal

25 January 2019 Friendly	Desna Chernihiv (Ukraine)	0–1	(Denmark) Aalborg	Turkey
14:00 EET (UTC+02:00)		Report	Pedersen

26 January 2019 Friendly	Desna Chernihiv (Ukraine)	1–0	(Kosovo) FC Prishtina	Turkey
14:50 EET (UTC+02:00)	Slinkin 53'	Report

30 January 2019 Friendly	Desna Chernihiv (Ukraine)	1–1	(Serbia) Mladost Lučani	Turkey
EET (UTC+02:00)	Bohdanov 16'	Report	Markoski 28'

8 February 2019 Friendly	Desna Chernihiv (Ukraine)	0–1	(Romania) Petrolul Ploiești	Turkey
EET (UTC+02:00)		Report	Goal

9 February 2019 Friendly	Desna Chernihiv (Ukraine)	4–0	(Kazakhstan) Kaysar Kyzylorda	Turkey
17:00 EET (UTC+02:00)	Serhiychuk 21'; Bezborodko 29' (pen.); Arshakyan 69'; Filippov 74'	Report

12 February 2019 Friendly	Desna Chernihiv (Ukraine)	2–0	(Georgia (country)) Dinamo Batumi	Turkey
17:00 EET (UTC+02:00)	Serhiychuk 32'; Volkov 35'	Report

14 February 2019 Friendly	SC Dnipro-1 (Ukraine)	2–0	(Ukraine) Desna Chernihiv	Turkey
16:00 EET (UTC+02:00)	Nazarenko 50'; Zahalskyi 81'	Report

17 February 2019 Friendly	Desna Chernihiv (Ukraine)	1–2	(Armenia) Gandzasar Kapan	Turkey
14:00 EET (UTC+02:00)	Kozak	Report	Goal

18 February 2019 Friendly	Desna Chernihiv (Ukraine)	4–0	(Georgia (country)) Rustavi	Turkey
EET (UTC+02:00)	D. Favorov; Volkov; Bezborodko	Report

23 March 2019 Friendly	FC Minsk (Belarus)	0–3	(Ukraine) Desna Chernihiv	Belarus
13:00 EET (UTC+02:00)		Report	Starenkyi; Kozak; Filippov

23 March 2019 Friendly	Energetik-BGU Minsk (Belarus)	1–2	(Ukraine) Desna Chernihiv	Belarus
EET (UTC+02:00)		Report	Serhiychuk; Bohdanov

26 March 2019 Friendly	Belshina Bobruisk (Belarus)	0–3	(Ukraine) Desna Chernihiv	Belarus
EET (UTC+02:00)		[ Report]	Khlyobas; Filippov; Slinkin

== Competitions ==
=== Overall ===
Competition	First match	Last match	Starting round	Final position	Record							
Competition	First match	Last match	Starting round	Final position	Pld	W	D	L	GF	GA	GD	Win %
Premier League	25 July 2018	29 May 2019	Matchday 1	8th	32	12	5	15	35	41	−6	37.50
Cup	26 September 2018	31 October 2018	Round of 32 (1/16)	Round of 16 (1/8)	2	1	1	0	4	3	+1	50.00
Total					34	13	6	15	39	44	−5	38.24

Last updated: 31 May 2019
Source: Competitions

=== Premier League ===
==== League table ====
Pos	Team	Pld	W	D	L	GF	GA	GD	Pts	Qualification or relegation
7	Vorskla Poltava	32	12	6	14	31	43	−12	42	
8	Desna Chernihiv	32	12	5	15	35	41	−6	41	
9	Olimpik Donetsk	32	7	13	12	41	48	−7	34	
10	Karpaty Lviv (O)	32	8	9	15	44	53	−9	33	Qualification for the Relegation play-offs
11	Chornomorets Odesa (R)	32	8	7	17	31	49	−18	31	Qualification for the Relegation play-offs

Source: Ukrainian Premier League (in Ukrainian), UEFA, Soccerway
Rules for classification: 1) Points; 2) Head-to-head points; 3) Head-to-head goal difference; 4) Head-to-head higher number of goals scored; 5) Goal difference; 6) Higher number of goals scored; 7) Draw or "golden match" if tied for title (Article 22, paragraph 3).
(O) Play-off winners; (R) Relegated

Teams that placed 10th and 11th in the 2018–19 Ukrainian Premier League play two-leg play-off with the second and third teams of the 2018–19 Ukrainian First League. The draw for play-offs took place on 24 May 2019 and the games will be played on 4 and 8 June 2019.

Team 1	Agg.	Team 2	1st leg	2nd leg
Chornomorets Odesa	0 – 2	Kolos Kovalivka	0 – 0	0 – 2
Karpaty Lviv	3 – 1	Volyn Lutsk	0 – 0	3 – 1

=== First leg ===
4 June 2019
19:00 UTC+3

Chornomorets Odesa	0 – 0	Kolos Kovalivka
	Report

Chornomorets Stadium, Odesa
Attendance: 5,435
Referee: Anatoliy Abdula (Kharkiv)

4 June 2019
19:00 UTC+3

Karpaty Lviv	0 – 0	Volyn Lutsk
	Report

Ukraina Stadium, Lviv
Attendance: 10,104
Referee: Denys Shurman (Vyshneve)

=== Second leg ===
8 June 2019
17:00 UTC+3

Kolos Kovalivka	2 – 0	Chornomorets Odesa
Havrysh 57', 63' (pen.)	Report

Kolos Stadium, Kovalivka
Attendance: 2,500
Referee: Vitaliy Romanov

Kolos Kovalivka won 2–0 on aggregate and were promoted to the 2019–20 Ukrainian Premier League. Chornomorets Odesa were relegated to the 2019–20 Ukrainian First League

8 June 2019
19:00 UTC+3

Volyn Lutsk	0 – 3 ~~1 – 3~~	Karpaty Lviv
Kozhanov 42'	Report	Klyots 37'; Ponde 82' (pen.); Miroshnichenko 90+5'

Avanhard Stadium, Lutsk
Attendance: 5,200
Referee: Maksym Kozyryatskyi

Karpaty Lviv won 3–0 on aggregate and retained their spot in the 2019–20 Ukrainian Premier League. Volyn Lutsk remained in the 2019–20 Ukrainian First League

Due to fan violence at the game and attack on referee, the original score 1–3 was scratched and replaced with technical score 0–3 loss to Volyn and win for Karpaty. Additionally, the Lutsk department of police started criminal proceedings on the fact of intentional damage to property during the game by the Karpaty fans.

==== Results summary ====
Overall								Home						Away					
Pld	W	D	L	GF	GA	GD	Pts	W	D	L	GF	GA	GD	W	D	L	GF	GA	GD
32	12	5	15	35	41	−6	41	6	1	9	15	21	−6	6	4	6	20	20	0

Last updated: 31 May 2019.
Source: Competitive matches

==== Results by round ====
Round	1	2	3	4	5	6	7	8	9	10	11	12	13	14	15	16	17	18	19	20	21	22	23	24	25	26	27	28	29	30	31	32
Ground	H	A	H	A	H	A	H	H	A	H	A	A	H	A	H	A	H	A	A	H	A	H	A	H	A	A	H	H	A	H	H	A
Result	L	W	L	L	D	W	L	W	L	L	W	L	W	D	W	W	L	D	W	L	D	L	W	W	D	L	L	W	L	L	W	L
Position	11	4	8	9	9	6	9	6	7	9	7	9	7	7	6	5	7	6	4	6	7	8	7	7	7	7	7	7	8	8	8	8

Updated to match(es) played on 31 May 2019. Source: Competitive matches
A = Away; H = Home; W = Win; D = Draw; L = Loss

==== Matches ====
25 July 2018 1	Desna Chernihiv	0–2	Shakhtar Donetsk	Chernihiv
19:00 EEST (UTC+03:00)	Koberidze (yellow card) 45+1'	Report	Alan Patrick (yellow card) 25'; Moraes 31'; Marlos 55'; Rakitskiy (yellow card) 90+1'	Stadium: Chernihiv Stadium; Attendance: 5,500; Referee: Anatoliy Abdula

29 July 2018 2	FC Mariupol	1–4	Desna Chernihiv	Mariupol
19:30 EEST (UTC+03:00)	Kyryukhantsev (yellow card) 28'; Vakula 68'	Report	Khlyobas 3', 22'; Filippov 59', 78'	Stadium: Volodymyr Boiko Stadium; Attendance: 1,516; Referee: Serhiy Boyko

5 August 2018 3	Desna Chernihiv	0–2	FC Oleksandriya	Chernihiv
19:30 EEST (UTC+03:00)	Mostovyi (yellow card) 41'; Lyulka (yellow card) 48'; Ohirya (yellow card) 76'; Khlyobas (yellow card) 84'; Starenkyi (yellow card) 90+1'	Report	Banada 6'; Bondarenko 53'; Polyarus (yellow card) 61'	Stadium: Chernihiv Stadium; Attendance: 4,080; Referee: Maksym Kozyryatskyi

12 August 2018 4	Chornomorets Odesa	1–0	Desna Chernihiv	Odesa
19:30 EEST (UTC+03:00)	Smirnov 72'	Report		Stadium: Chornomorets Odesa; Attendance: 5,410; Referee: Oleksandr Omelchenko

19 August 2018 5	Desna Chernihiv	2–2	Karpaty Lviv	Chernihiv
17:00 EEST (UTC+03:00)	Bezborodko 25'; Koberidze (yellow card) 39'; Favorov 42'	Report	Erbes (yellow card) 20'; Miroshnichenko 58'; Carrascal (yellow card) 62'; Mehremić 80'	Stadium: Chernihiv Stadium; Attendance: 4,188; Referee: Dmytro Bondarenko

26 August 2018 6	Zorya Luhansk	0–2	Desna Chernihiv	Zaporizhia
19:30 EEST (UTC+03:00)	Lyednyev (yellow card) 45'	Report	Starenkyi 11'; Bezborodko 73'	Stadium: Slavutych-Arena; Attendance: 2,228; Referee: Ievgenii Aranovskyi

2 September 2018 7	Desna Chernihiv	0–1	Olimpik Donetsk	Chernihiv
14:00 EEST (UTC+03:00)	Ohirya (yellow card) 45'; Hitchenko (yellow card) 55' (yellow-red card) 76'; Filippov (yellow card) 60'	Report	Yevhen Pasich (yellow card) 39'; Bilonoh 54'; Dehtyarev (yellow card) 56'	Stadium: Chernihiv Stadium; Attendance: 3,567; Referee: Vitaliy Romanov

14 September 2018 8	Desna Chernihiv	1–0	Arsenal Kyiv	Chernihiv
19:00 EEST (UTC+03:00)	Artem Favorov 8'; Filippov (yellow card) 46'; Volkov (yellow card) 90+3'	Report	Datsenko (yellow card) 68'	Stadium: Chernihiv Stadium; Attendance: 3,274; Referee: Kostiantyn Trukhanov

23 September 2018 9	Dynamo Kyiv	4–0	Desna Chernihiv	Kyiv
17:00 EEST (UTC+03:00)	Harmash (yellow card) 21'; Burda 45'; Verbič 67'; Kędziora 74'; Tsyhankov 87'	Report	Bratkov (yellow card) 7'	Stadium: NSC Olimpiyskiy; Attendance: 10,318; Referee: Kateryna Monzul

30 September 2018 10	Desna Chernihiv	0–2	Vorskla Poltava	Chernihiv
14:00 EEST (UTC+03:00)		Report	Kulach 4'; Chesnakov (yellow card) 28'; Sharpar 62'	Stadium: Chernihiv Stadium; Attendance: 2,847; Referee: Oleksandr Omelchenko

7 October 2018 11	FC Lviv	1–3	Desna Chernihiv	Lviv
14:00 EEST (UTC+03:00)	Zapadnya (yellow card) 22'; Bruno Duarte 52'	Report	Artem Favorov 4', 87', (yellow card) 25'; Mostovyi (yellow card) 24'; Filippov 28', (yellow card) 80'; Yermakov (yellow card) 31' (yellow-red card) 45'; Starenkyi (yellow card) 42'; Kartushov (yellow card) 66'; Past (yellow card) 90+4'	Stadium: Arena Lviv; Attendance: 2,131; Referee: Mykola Balakin

19 October 2018 12	Shakhtar Donetsk	1–0	Desna Chernihiv	Kharkiv
19:00 EEST (UTC+03:00)	Kayode (red card) 64'; Moraes (yellow card) 78'; Maycon 88'; Marlos (yellow card) 90'	Report	Koberidze (yellow card) 34'; Mostovyi (yellow card) 69'; Past (yellow card) 81'; Imerekov (yellow card) 87'	Stadium: OSC Metalist; Attendance: 4,119; Referee: Serhiy Boyko

27 October 2018 13	Desna Chernihiv	2–0	FC Mariupol	Chernihiv
14:00 EEST (UTC+03:00)	Bezborodko 5', 47'	Report	Boryachuk (yellow card) 41'	Stadium: Chernihiv Stadium; Attendance: 2,873; Referee: Oleksandr Derdo

4 November 2018 14	FC Oleksandriya	1–1	Desna Chernihiv	Oleksandriya
14:00 EET (UTC+02:00)	Banada (yellow card) 31'; Zaporozhan 53' (pen.), (yellow card) 65'; Shendrik (yellow card) 67'; Ponomar (yellow card) 70'; Dovhyi (yellow card) 79'	Report	Koberidze (yellow card) 50'; Artem Favorov (yellow card) 71'; Hitchenko 87'	Stadium: CSC Nika Stadium; Attendance: 1,378; Referee: Volodymyr Novokhatniy

10 November 2018 15	Desna Chernihiv	2–0	Chornomorets Odesa	Chernihiv
17:00 EET (UTC+02:00)	Denys Favorov (yellow card) 15'; Bezborodko 55'; Artem Favorov 63'	Report	Ryzhuk (yellow card) 28' (yellow-red card) 42'	Stadium: Chernihiv Stadium; Attendance: 2,618; Referee: Oleksandr Omelchenko

24 November 2018 16	Karpaty Lviv	0–2	Desna Chernihiv	Lviv
14:00 EET (UTC+02:00)	Boroday (yellow card) 39' (yellow-red card) 52'; Méndez (yellow card) 90+1'	Report	Filippov 27'; Starenkyi 44'; Ohirya (yellow card) 86'	Stadium: Ukraina Stadium; Attendance: 1,361; Referee: Kostiantyn Trukhanov

1 December 2018 17	Desna Chernihiv	0–2	Zorya Luhansk	Kyiv
15:00 EET (UTC+02:00)	Starenkyi (yellow card) 29'; Artem Favorov (yellow card) 81'	Report	Silas 23', (yellow card) 87'; Vernydub (yellow card) 54'; Kabayev 80'	Stadium: Obolon Arena; Attendance: 670; Referee: Dmytro Kryvushkin

9 December 2018 18	Olimpik Donetsk	1–1	Desna Chernihiv	Kyiv
14:00 EET (UTC+02:00)	Yevhen Pasich 60'; Koltsov (yellow card) 90+3'	Report	Mostovyi (yellow card) 13'; Denys Favorov 63'	Stadium: Dynamo Stadium; Attendance: 330; Referee: Denys Shurman

24 February 2019 19	Arsenal Kyiv	0–2	Desna Chernihiv	Kyiv
14:00 EET (UTC+02:00)	Semenyuk (yellow card) 32'; Tankovskyi (yellow card) 62'; Bashlay (yellow card) 86'; Orikhovskyi (yellow card) 90'	Report	Denys Favorov 1'; Filippov (yellow card) 54'; Bohdanov (yellow card) 68'; Artem Favorov 90+1' (pen.)	Stadium: Dynamo Stadium; Attendance: 525; Referee: Oleksandr Derdo

2 March 2019 20	Desna Chernihiv	1–2	Dynamo Kyiv	Chernihiv
14:00 EET (UTC+02:00)	Artem Favorov (yellow card) 22'; Bezborodko (yellow card) 40'; Partsvania (yellow card) 70'; Serhiychuk (yellow card) 79'; Kartushov 83'	Report	Kędziora 25'; Buyalskyi 68'; Rusyn (yellow card) 90+1'	Stadium: Chernihiv Stadium; Attendance: 5,500; Referee: Yaroslav Kozyk

9 March 2019 21	Vorskla Poltava	0–0	Desna Chernihiv	Poltava
17:00 EET (UTC+02:00)	Kane (yellow card) 20' (yellow-red card) 83'; Giorgadze (yellow card) 32'; Chyzhov (yellow card) 39' (yellow-red card) 90+3'; Habelok (yellow card) 60'	Report	Mostovyi (yellow card) 25'; Bezborodko (yellow card) 71'; Filippov (yellow card) 72'; Volkov (yellow card) 87'	Stadium: Vorskla Stadium; Attendance: 1,602; Referee: Vitaliy Romanov

17 March 2019 22	Desna Chernihiv	0–1	FC Lviv	Chernihiv
17:00 EET (UTC+02:00)	Artem Favorov (yellow card) 28'; Denys Favorov (yellow card) 41'; Mostovyi (yellow card) 85'; Serhiychuk (yellow card) 90'	Report	Marthã (yellow card) 33'; Pedro Vitor 58', (yellow card) 85'	Stadium: Chernihiv Stadium; Attendance: 4,643; Referee: Dmytro Kutakov

6 April 2019 23	Olimpik Donetsk	0–2	Desna Chernihiv	Kyiv
14:00 EEST (UTC+03:00)	Dieye (yellow card) 26'; Hryshko (yellow card) 87'	Report	Denys Favorov 20', (yellow card) 89'; Artem Favorov (yellow card) 54'; Starenkyi 70'	Stadium: Dynamo Stadium; Attendance: 1,470; Referee: Kostiantyn Trukhanov

14 April 2019 24	Desna Chernihiv	2–1	Karpaty Lviv	Chernihiv
14:00 EEST (UTC+03:00)	Kartushov 8'; Artem Favorov (yellow card) 29'; Denys Favorov 72' (pen.)	Report	Shved 18'; Hongla (yellow card) 83'	Stadium: Chernihiv Stadium; Attendance: 2,861; Referee: Kateryna Monzul

23 April 2019 25	Vorskla Poltava	3–3	Desna Chernihiv	Poltava
19:30 EEST (UTC+03:00)	Martynenko (yellow card) 29'; Habelok 52'; Kobakhidze (yellow card) 55'; Sharpar 62' (pen.); Careca 71'	Report	Serhiychuk 2' (pen.), 42'; Khlyobas 14'; Mostovyi (yellow card) 27'; Artem Favorov (yellow card) 84'	Stadium: Vorskla Stadium; Attendance: 1,215; Referee: Volodymyr Novokhatniy

29 April 2019 26	Arsenal Kyiv	2–0	Desna Chernihiv	Kyiv
17:00 EEST (UTC+03:00)	Avahimyan 11'; Orikhovskyi 27' (pen.)	Report	Slinkin (yellow card) 26'; Imerekov (yellow card) 30'; Ohirya (yellow card) 40'; Filippov (yellow card) 55'	Stadium: Dynamo Stadium; Attendance: 307; Referee: Yuriy Mozharovskyi

5 May 2019 27	Desna Chernihiv	2–4	Chornomorets Odesa	Chernihiv
5 May EEST (UTC+03:00)	Denys Favorov 13'; Nyemchaninov (yellow card) 18'; Bohdanov (yellow card) 19'; Hitchenko 22'; Artem Favorov (yellow card) 46'; Kartushov (yellow card) 56'	Report	Vilhjálmsson 19', 86'; Koval (yellow card) 36'; Babenko (yellow card) 43'; Ryzhuk (yellow card) 79'; Pavlov (yellow card) 88', (goal) 90'; Musolitin 90+4'	Stadium: Chernihiv Stadium; Attendance: 3,074; Referee: Ivan Bondar

12 May 2019 28	Desna Chernihiv	2–1	Olimpik Donetsk	Chernihiv
14:00 EEST (UTC+03:00)	Denys Favorov 15'; Filippov 48'; Artem Favorov (yellow card) 90+4'	Report	Kravchuk (yellow card) 31'; Dieye 51'; Hryshko (yellow card) 62'	Stadium: Chernihiv Stadium; Attendance: 2,496; Referee: Kostiantyn Trukhanov

18 May 2019 29	Karpaty Lviv	2–0	Desna Chernihiv	Lviv
17:00 EEST (UTC+03:00)	Yoda (yellow card) 50' (yellow-red card) 51'; Ponde 52', (yellow card) 64'; Myakushko 77'; Nesterov (yellow card) 86'	Report	Artem Favorov (yellow card) 24'; Denys Favorov (yellow card) 51'; Ohirya (yellow card) 76'	Stadium: Ukraina Stadium; Attendance: 777; Referee: Maksym Kozyryatskyi

21 May 2019 30	Desna Chernihiv	0–1	Vorskla Poltava	Chernihiv
17:00 EEST (UTC+03:00)	Bezborodko (yellow card) 45'	Report	Petrović 30'; Kolomoyets (yellow card) 38'; Vasin (yellow card) 63'; Tkachenko (yellow card) 80'; Šehić (yellow card) 82'; Martynenko (yellow card) 86'	Stadium: Chernihiv Stadium; Attendance: 2,059; Referee: Dmytro Kutakov

25 May 2019 31	Desna Chernihiv	1–0	Arsenal Kyiv	Chernihiv
17:00 EEST (UTC+03:00)	Bohdanov 31'; Mostovyi (yellow card) 63'; Artem Favorov (yellow card) 65'; Denys Favorov (yellow card) 73'; Kartushov (yellow card) 89'	Report	Pidkivka (yellow card) 76'	Stadium: Chernihiv Stadium; Attendance: 2,040; Referee: Anatoliy Abdula

29 May 2019 32	Chornomorets Odesa	3–0	Desna Chernihiv	Odesa
17:00 EEST (UTC+03:00)	Ryzhuk (yellow card) 28'; Tanchyk 62'; Vilhjálmsson 73' (pen.), 85', (yellow card) 83'; Ostapenko (yellow card) 78'	Report	Denys Favorov (yellow card) 6'; Ohirya (yellow card) 19'; Nyemchaninov (red card) 72'	Stadium: Chornomorets Odesa; Attendance: 4,285; Referee: Mykola Balakin

=== Ukrainian Cup ===
26 September 2018 Round of 32	Krystal Kherson	2–3	Desna Chernihiv	Kherson
15:00 EEST (UTC+03:00)	Shevtsov (yellow card) 40'; Ihnatyev (yellow card) 71'; Barladym 76'; Bryzhchuk 90+3'	Report	Denys Favorov 52'; Yakymiv (yellow card) 58'; Volkov 60', (yellow card) 70'; Khlyobas 81'	Stadium: Stadion Kherson; Attendance: 1,626; Referee: Ivan Bondar

31 October 2018 Round of 16 (1/8)	Desna Chernihiv	1–1 (4 – 5 p)	Zorya Luhansk	Chernihiv
19:30 EET (UTC+02:00)	Bezborodko 37'; Lyulka (yellow card) 47'; Denys Favorov (yellow card) 72'; Yermakov (yellow card) 78'; Starenkyi (yellow card) 105'	Report	Mykhaylychenko (yellow card) 28'; Lytvyn (yellow card) 72'; Kharatin (yellow card) 77'; Lyednyev 84'	Stadium: Chernihiv Stadium; Attendance: 4,063; Referee: Ivan Bondar
	Penalties
	Artem Favorov (penalty scored); Filippov (penalty scored); Kartushov (penalty missed); Khlyobas (penalty scored); Denys Favorov (penalty scored)		Karavayev (penalty scored); Hromov (penalty scored); Acevedo (penalty scored); Lyednyev (penalty scored); Kharatin (penalty scored)

== Statistics ==
=== Appearances and goals ===
No.	Pos	Nat	Player	Total		Premier League		Cup	
No.	Pos	Nat	Player	Apps	Goals	Apps	Goals	Apps	Goals
Goalkeepers
44	GK	(Ukraine) UKR	Yevhen Past	21	0	21	0	0	0
72	GK	(Ukraine) UKR	Ihor Lytovka	13	0	11	0	2	0
	GK	(Ukraine) UKR	Kostyantyn Makhnovskyi	0	0	0	0	0	0
	GK	(Ukraine) UKR	Maksym Tatarenko	0	0	0	0	0	0
Defenders
3	DF	(Ukraine) UKR	Temur Partsvania	8	0	3+5	0	0	0
17	DF	(Ukraine) UKR	Andriy Hitchenko	25	2	24	2	0+1	0
21	DF	(Ukraine) UKR	Serhiy Lyulka	14	0	7+6	0	1	0
23	DF	(Ukraine) UKR	Dmytro Nyemchaninov	5	0	5	0	0	0
32	DF	(Ukraine) UKR	Maksym Imerekov	23	0	21	0	2	0
33	DF	(Ukraine) UKR	Andriy Slinkin	8	0	7+1	0	0	0
45	DF	(Ukraine) UKR	Denys Favorov	33	8	31	7	2	1
Midfielders
7	MF	(Ukraine) UKR	Vladyslav Ohirya	29	0	28	0	1	0
12	MF	(Ukraine) UKR	Yehor Kartushov	28	2	22+4	2	0+2	0
14	MF	(Ukraine) UKR	Andriy Yakymiv	6	0	2+2	0	2	0
15	MF	(Ukraine) UKR	Renat Mochulyak	1	0	0+1	0	0	0
16	MF	(Ukraine) UKR	Yevheniy Belych	1	0	0+1	0	0	0
18	MF	(Ukraine) UKR	Mykhaylo Kozak	4	0	1+3	0	0	0
19	MF	(Ukraine) UKR	Artem Favorov	29	5	26+2	5	0+1	0
22	MF	(Ukraine) UKR	Andriy Mostovyi	26	0	24	0	2	0
27	MF	(Ukraine) UKR	Serhiy Starenkyi	23	3	10+12	3	1	0
79	MF	(Ukraine) UKR	Mykhaylo Serhiychuk	11	2	4+7	2	0	0
89	MF	(Ukraine) UKR	Oleksandr Volkov	21	1	16+3	0	1+1	1
90	MF	(Ukraine) UKR	Andriy Bohdanov	13	1	11+2	1	0	0
Forwards
9	FW	(Ukraine) UKR	Dmytro Khlyobas	23	4	11+10	3	1+1	1
10	FW	(Ukraine) UKR	Oleksandr Filippov	30	5	24+4	5	1+1	0
20	FW	(Ukraine) UKR	Denys Bezborodko	24	6	16+7	5	1	1
	FW	(Ukraine) UKR	Roman Vovk	0	0	0+0	0	0	0
Players transferred out during the season
4	DF	(Ukraine) UKR	Anton Bratkov	17	0	14+2	0	1	0
5	DF	(Ukraine) UKR	Vitaliy Yermakov	9	0	3+4	0	2	0
8	MF	(Ukraine) UKR	Maksym Banasevych	12	0	2+9	0	1	0
11	MF	(Ukraine) UKR	Ruslan Kisil	1	0	1	0	0	0
13	MF	(Georgia (country)) GEO	Luka Koberidze	11	0	7+4	0	0	0
29	FW	(Ukraine) UKR	Oleksandr Kovpak	8	0	0+7	0	1	0
	FW	(Ukraine) UKR	Roman Vovk	0	0	0+0	0	0	0

Source: Competitions

Last updated: 31 May 2019

=== Goalscorers ===
Rank	No.	Pos	Nat	Name	Premier League	Cup	Total
1	45	DF	(Ukraine)	Denys Favorov	7	1	8
2	20	FW	(Ukraine)	Denys Bezborodko	5	1	6
3	10	FW	(Ukraine)	Oleksandr Filippov	5	0	5
3	19	MF	(Ukraine)	Artem Favorov	5	0	5
5	9	FW	(Ukraine)	Dmytro Khlyobas	3	1	4
6	27	MF	(Ukraine)	Serhiy Starenkyi	3	0	3
7	12	MF	(Ukraine)	Yehor Kartushov	2	0	2
7	17	DF	(Ukraine)	Andriy Hitchenko	2	0	2
7	79	MF	(Ukraine)	Mykhaylo Serhiychuk	2	0	2
10	81	MF	(Ukraine)	Oleksandr Volkov	0	1	1
10	90	MF	(Ukraine)	Andriy Bohdanov	1	0	1
				Own goal	0	0	0
				Total	35	4	39

Last updated: 31 May 2019

=== Clean sheets ===
Rank	No.	Pos	Nat	Name	Premier League	Cup	Total
1	44	GK	(Ukraine)	Yevhen Past	7	0	7
1	72	GK	(Ukraine)	Ihor Lytovka	2	0	2
				Total	9	0	9

Last updated: 31 May 2019

=== Disciplinary record ===
No.	Pos	Nat	Player	Premier League			Cup			Total		
No.	Pos	Nat	Player	Booked	(yellow card) (yellow-red card)	Sent off (straight red)	Booked	(yellow card) (yellow-red card)	Sent off (straight red)	Booked	(yellow card) (yellow-red card)	Sent off (straight red)
3	DF	(Ukraine)	Temur Partsvania	1	0	0	0	0	0	1	0	0
4	DF	(Ukraine)	Anton Bratkov	1	0	0	0	0	0	1	0	0
5	DF	(Ukraine)	Vitaliy Yermakov	0	1	0	1	0	0	1	1	0
7	MF	(Ukraine)	Vladyslav Ohirya	6	0	0	0	0	0	6	0	0
9	FW	(Ukraine)	Dmytro Khlyobas	1	0	0	0	0	0	1	0	0
10	FW	(Ukraine)	Oleksandr Filippov	6	0	0	0	0	0	6	0	0
12	MF	(Ukraine)	Yehor Kartushov	3	0	0	0	0	0	3	0	0
13	MF	(Georgia (country))	Luka Koberidze	4	0	0	0	0	0	4	0	0
14	MF	(Ukraine)	Andriy Yakymiv	0	0	0	1	0	0	1	0	0
17	DF	(Ukraine)	Andriy Hitchenko	0	1	0	0	0	0	0	1	0
19	MF	(Ukraine)	Artem Favorov	12	0	0	0	0	0	12	0	0
20	FW	(Ukraine)	Denys Bezborodko	3	0	0	0	0	0	3	0	0
21	DF	(Ukraine)	Serhiy Lyulka	1	0	0	1	0	0	2	0	0
22	MF	(Ukraine)	Andriy Mostovyi	8	0	0	0	0	0	8	0	0
23	DF	(Ukraine)	Dmytro Nyemchaninov	1	0	1	0	0	0	1	0	1
27	MF	(Ukraine)	Serhiy Starenkyi	3	0	0	1	0	0	4	0	0
32	DF	(Ukraine)	Maksym Imerekov	2	0	0	0	0	0	2	0	0
33	DF	(Ukraine)	Andriy Slinkin	1	0	0	0	0	0	1	0	0
44	GK	(Ukraine)	Yevhen Past	2	0	0	0	0	0	2	0	0
45	DF	(Ukraine)	Denys Favorov	6	0	0	1	0	0	7	0	0
79	MF	(Ukraine)	Mykhaylo Serhiychuk	2	0	0	0	0	0	2	0	0
89	MF	(Ukraine)	Oleksandr Volkov	2	0	0	1	0	0	3	0	0
90	MF	(Ukraine)	Andriy Bohdanov	2	0	0	0	0	0	2	0	0
			Total	67	2	1	6	0	0	73	2	1

Last updated: 31 May 2019
