= 2017–18 FC Desna Chernihiv season =

FC Desna Chernihiv
2017–18 season
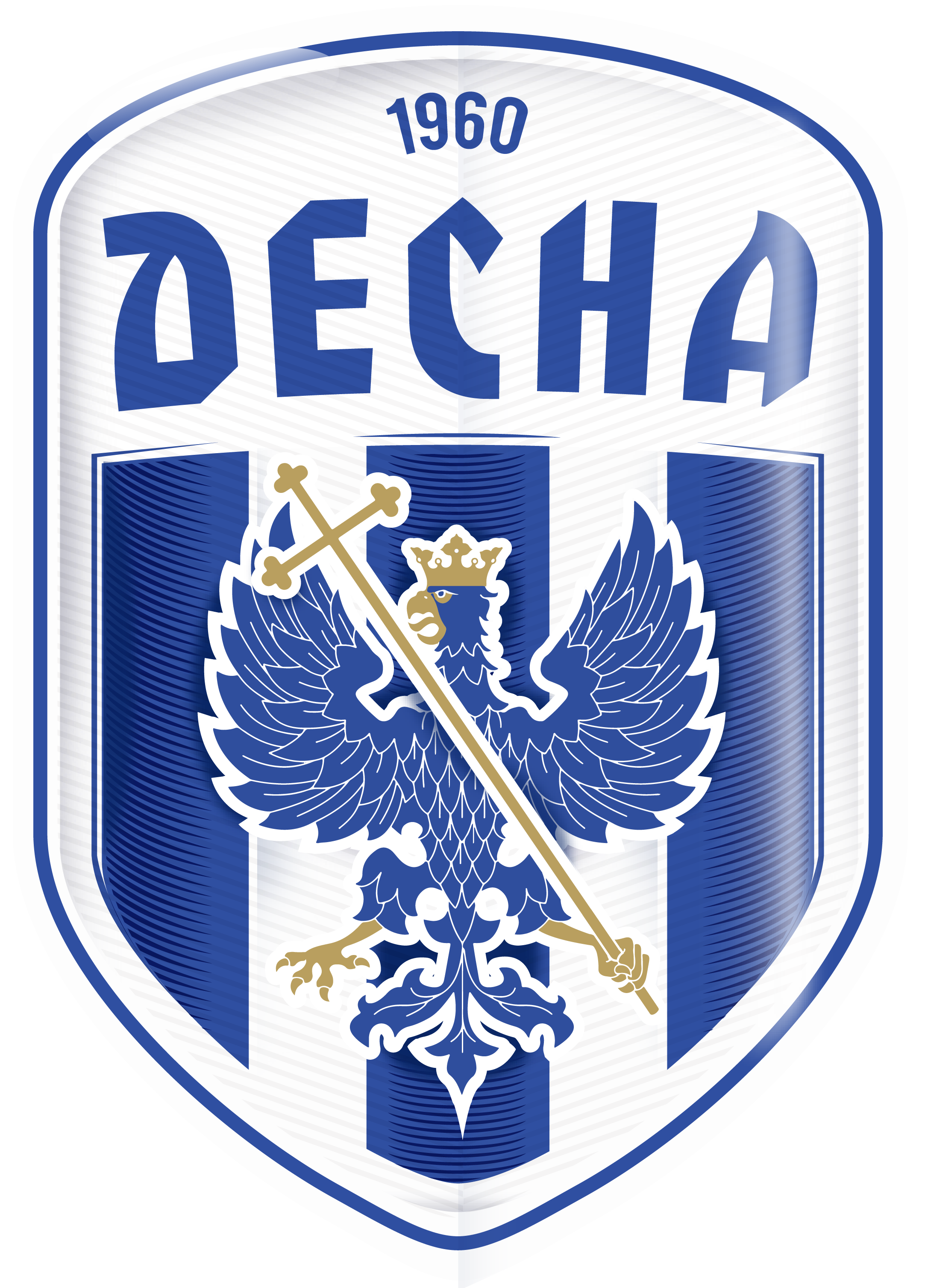
- President: Volodymyr Levin
- Manager: Oleksandr Ryabokon
- Stadium: Chernihiv Stadium
- Ukrainian First League: 3rd
- Ukrainian Cup: Round of 8 (1/4)
- Top goalscorer: League: Denys Favorov (12); All: Denys Favorov (13)
Home colours	Away colours

For the 2017–18 season the club competed in the Ukrainian First League and Ukrainian Cup.

== Players ==
=== Squad information ===
As of 31 May 2019

Squad no.	Name	Nationality	Position	Date of birth (age)
Goalkeepers
44	Kostyantyn Makhnovskyi	(Ukraine)	GK	1 January 1989 (aged 30)
72	Ihor Lytovka	(Ukraine)	GK	5 June 1988 (aged 30)
Defenders
3	Temur Partsvania	(Ukraine) (Georgia (country))	DF	6 July 1991 (aged 27)
17	Andriy Hitchenko	(Ukraine)	DF	2 October 1984 (aged 34)
21	Serhiy Lyulka	(Ukraine)	DF	22 February 1990 (aged 29)
23	Dmytro Nyemchaninov	(Ukraine)	DF	27 January 1990 (aged 29)
32	Maksym Imerekov	(Ukraine)	DF	23 January 1991 (aged 28)
33	Andriy Slinkin	(Ukraine)	DF	19 February 1991 (aged 28)
45	Denys Favorov (Captain)	(Ukraine)	DF	1 April 1991 (aged 28)
Midfielders
7	Vladyslav Ohirya	(Ukraine)	MF	3 April 1990 (aged 29)
12	Yehor Kartushov	(Ukraine)	MF	5 January 1991 (aged 28)
14	Andriy Yakymiv ^{List B}	(Ukraine)	MF	15 June 1997 (aged 21)
15	Renat Mochulyak ^{List B}	(Ukraine)	MF	15 February 1998 (aged 21)
16	Yevheniy Belych ^{List B}	(Ukraine)	MF	9 January 2001 (aged 18)
18	Mykhaylo Kozak	(Ukraine)	MF	20 January 1991 (aged 28)
19	Artem Favorov	(Ukraine)	MF	19 March 1994 (aged 25)
22	Andriy Mostovyi	(Ukraine)	MF	24 January 1988 (aged 31)
27	Serhiy Starenkyi	(Ukraine)	MF	20 September 1984 (aged 34)
79	Mykhaylo Serhiychuk	(Ukraine)	MF	29 July 1991 (aged 27)
89	Oleksandr Volkov	(Ukraine)	MF	7 February 1989 (aged 30)
90	Andriy Bohdanov	(Ukraine)	MF	21 January 1990 (aged 29)
Forwards
9	Dmytro Khlyobas	(Ukraine)	FW	9 May 1994 (aged 25)
10	Oleksandr Filippov	(Ukraine)	FW	23 October 1992 (aged 26)
20	Denys Bezborodko (on loan from Shakhtar Donetsk)	(Ukraine)	FW	31 May 1994 (aged 25)

== Transfers ==
=== In ===
Date	Pos.	Player	Age	Moving from	Type	Fee	Source
Summer
1 June 2017	DF	(Ukraine) Temur Partsvania	38	(Ukraine) Olimpik Donetsk	Transfer	Free	
1 June 2017	DF	(Ukraine) Denys Bezborodko	38	(Ukraine) Shakhtar Donetsk	On Loan	Free	
1 June 2017	DF	(Ukraine) Vadym Zhuk	38	(Ukraine) Sumy	Transfer	Free	
1 June 2017	DF	(Ukraine) Denys Oliynyk	38	(Germany) Darmstadt 98	Transfer	Free	
12 July 2017	MF	(Ukraine) Denys Skepskyi	38	(Ukraine) Cherkaskyi Dnipro	Transfer	Free	
Winter
1 January 2018	MF	(Ukraine) Artem Favorov	24	(Ukraine) Zirka Kropyvnytskyi	Transfer	Free	
1 February 2018	GK	(Ukraine) Ihor Lytovka	24	(Ukraine) Unattached	Transfer	Free	
20 January 2018	MF	(Ukraine) Vladyslav Ohirya	24	(Kazakhstan) Irtysh Pavlodar	Transfer	Free	
20 February 2018	MF	(Ukraine) Andriy Slinkin	24	Unattached	Transfer	Free	
20 February 2018	DF	(Ukraine) Vitaliy Yermakov	26	(Ukraine) Avanhard Kramatorsk	Transfer	Free	
2 March 2018	MF	(Ukraine) Yevhen Chumak	26	(Belarus) Dnepr Mogilev	Transfer	Free	
11 March 2018	MF	(Georgia (country)) Giorgi Gadrani	23	(Georgia (country)) Dinamo Tbilisi	Transfer	Free	
11 March 2018	DF	(Ukraine) Kyrylo Sydorenko	23	(Ukraine) Helios Kharkiv	Transfer	Free	

=== Out ===
Date	Pos.	Player	Age	Moving to	Type	Fee	Source
Summer
1 June 2017	DF	(Ukraine) Mykyta Vovchenko	25	(Poland) Chemik Police	Transfer	Free	
Winter
31 December 2017	MF	(Ukraine) Denys Skepskyi	38	Unattached	Transfer	Free	
1 January 2018	MF	(Ukraine) Oleh Shevchenko	24	(Ukraine) Polissya Zhytomyr	Transfer	Free	
1 January 2018	MF	(Ukraine) Anton Bratkov	24	(Ukraine) Zirka Kropyvnytskyi	Transfer	Free	
1 January 2018	DF	(Ukraine) Temur Partsvania	38	(Ukraine) Olimpik Donetsk	Transfer	Free	
1 January 2018	MF	(Ukraine) Denys Oliynyk	38	(Ukraine) Helios Kharkiv	Transfer	Free	
14 January 2018	MF	(Ukraine) Oleksandr Chornomorets	38	Unattached	Transfer	Free	
14 March 2018	MF	(Ukraine) Pavlo Shchedrakov	38	(Ukraine) Polissya Zhytomyr	Transfer	Free	
2 March 2018	MF	(Ukraine) Illya Kovalenko	24	(Ukraine) Sumy	On Loan	Free	

== Statistics ==
=== Appearances and goals ===
No.	Pos	Nat	Player	Total		Premier League		Cup	
No.	Pos	Nat	Player	Apps	Goals	Apps	Goals	Apps	Goals
Goalkeepers
	GK	(Ukraine) UKR	Kostyantyn Makhnovskyi	29	0	29	0	0	0
	GK	(Ukraine) UKR	Ihor Lytovka	5	0	5	0	0	0
	GK	(Ukraine) UKR	Serhiy Melashenko	1	0	1	0	0	0
Defenders
	DF	(Ukraine) UKR	Vadym Melnyk	27	1	27	1	0	0
	DF	(Ukraine) UKR	Anton Bratkov	21	0	21	0	0	0
	DF	(Ukraine) UKR	Andriy Mostovyi	33	1	33	1	0	0
	DF	(Georgia (country)) GEO	Giorgi Gadrani	5	0	5	0	0	0
	DF	(Ukraine) UKR	Temur Partsvaniya	12	1	10	1	2	0
	DF	(Ukraine) UKR	Andriy Slinkin	9	1	9	1	0	0
	DF	(Ukraine) UKR	Vitaliy Yermakov	10	0	10	0	0	0
	DF	(Ukraine) UKR	Oleksandr Chornomorets	16	0	16	0	0	0
	DF	(Ukraine) UKR	Kyrylo Sydorenko	5	1	5	1	0	0
	DF	(Ukraine) UKR	Oleksandr Holovko	12	1	12	1	0	0
Midfielders
	MF	(Ukraine) UKR	Artem Favorov	13	1	12	1	1	0
	MF	(Ukraine) UKR	Maksym Banasevych	20	2	20	2	0	0
	MF	(Ukraine) UKR	Pavlo Shchedrakov	16	0	16	0	0	0
	MF	(Georgia (country)) GEO	Levan Arveladze	29	4	29	4	0	0
	MF	(Ukraine) UKR	Denys Skepskyi	14	0	14	0	0	0
	MF	(Georgia (country)) GEO	Luka Koberidze	24	0	24	0	0	0
	MF	(Ukraine) UKR	Illya Kovalenko	14	1	14	1	0	0
	MF	(Ukraine) UKR	Ihor Kirienko	15	1	15	1	0	0
	MF	(Ukraine) UKR	Denys Favorov	25	12	25	12	0	0
	MF	(Ukraine) UKR	Yevhen Chumak	11	2	11	2	0	0
	MF	(Ukraine) UKR	Vladyslav Ohirya	12	0	12	0	0	0
	MF	(Ukraine) UKR	Vadym Zhuk	7	0	7	0	0	0
Forwards
	MF	(Ukraine) UKR	Oleksandr Volkov	28	8	28	8	0	0
	FW	(Ukraine) UKR	Denys Halenkov	7	0	7	0	0	0
	FW	(Ukraine) UKR	Oleksandr Filippov	29	11	29	11	0	0
	FW	(Ukraine) UKR	Volodymyr Lysenko	1	0	1	0	0	0
	FW	(Ukraine) UKR	Denys Bezborodko	26	9	26	9	0	0
	FW	(Ukraine) UKR	Yevhen Chepurnenko	19	3	19	3	0	0
	FW	(Ukraine) UKR	Denys Oliynyk	6	0	6	0	0	0
	FW	(Ukraine) UKR	Yehor Kartushov	25	4	25	4	0	0
Players transferred out during the season
	GK	(Ukraine) UKR	Oleh Shevchenko	0	0	0	0	0	0
	MF	(Ukraine) UKR	Denys Skepskyi	14	0	14	0	0	0
	DF	(Ukraine) UKR	Temur Partsvaniya	12	1	10	1	2	0
	FW	(Ukraine) UKR	Denys Oliynyk	6	0	6	0	0	0
	DF	(Ukraine) UKR	Anton Bratkov	21	0	21	0	0	0
	MF	(Ukraine) UKR	Pavlo Shchedrakov	16	0	16	0	0	0
	MF	(Ukraine) UKR	Illya Kovalenko	14	1	14	1	0	0

Source: Competitions

Last updated: 31 May 2019

=== Goalscorers ===
Rank	No.	Pos	Nat	Name	Premier League	Cup	Europa League	Total
1		MF	(Ukraine)	Denys Favorov	12	1	0	13
2		FW	(Ukraine)	Oleksandr Filippov	11	1	0	12
3		FW	(Ukraine)	Denys Bezborodko	9	0	0	9
4		MF	(Ukraine)	Oleksandr Volkov	8	0	0	8
5		FW	(Ukraine)	Yehor Kartushov	4	2	0	6
6		MF	(Georgia (country))	Levan Arveladze	4	0	0	4
7		FW	(Ukraine)	Yevhen Chepurnenko	3	0	0	3
8		MF	(Ukraine)	Maksym Banasevych	2	0	0	2
8		MF	(Ukraine)	Yevhen Chumak	2	0	0	2
9		DF	(Ukraine)	Vadym Melnyk	1	0	0	1
9		DF	(Ukraine)	Andriy Mostovyi	1	0	0	1
9		DF	(Ukraine)	Temur Partsvaniya	1	0	0	1
9		DF	(Ukraine)	Andriy Slinkin	1	0	0	1
9		DF	(Ukraine)	Kyrylo Sydorenko	1	0	0	1
9		MF	(Ukraine)	Artem Favorov	1	0	0	1
9		MF	(Ukraine)	Illya Kovalenko	1	0	0	1
9		MF	(Ukraine)	Ihor Kirienko	1	0	0	1
				Total	63	4	0	67

Last updated: 31 May 2019
