= Vitaliy Yermakov =

Ukrainian footballer

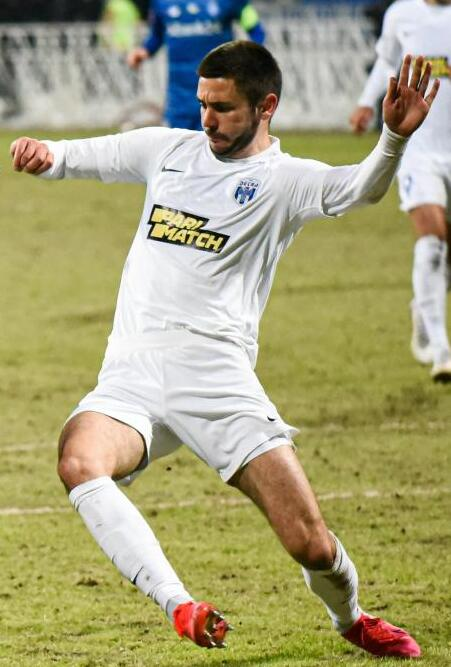

Personal information
- Full name: Vitaliy Mykhaylovych Yermakov
- Date of birth: 7 June 1992 (age 34)
- Place of birth: Rubizhne, Ukraine
- Height: 1.86 m (6 ft 1 in)
- Position: Centre-back

Team information
- Current team: Obolon Kyiv

Youth career
- Stal Alchevsk

Senior career*
Years	Team	Apps	(Gls)
2007–2011	Stal-2 Alchevsk		
2009–2015	Stal Alchevsk	61	(1)
2015	Pontos Vityazevo (amateurs)		
2016–2018	Avanhard Kramatorsk	62	(3)
2018–2021	Desna Chernihiv	43	(1)
2019	→ Avanhard Kramatorsk (loan)	10	(0)
2021–2022	Metalist 1925 Kharkiv	16	(0)
2022–2026	Chornomorets Odesa	96	(8)
2026–	Obolon Kyiv	9	(0)
- * Club domestic league appearances and goals as of 7 November 2026

Vitaliy Mykhaylovych Yermakov (Ukrainian: Віталій Михайлович Єрмаков; born 7 June 1992) is a Ukrainian professional footballer who plays as a centre-back for Obolon Kyiv.

== Club career ==
=== Desna Chernihiv ===
He made his Ukrainian Premier League debut for Desna Chernihiv on 29 July 2018 in a game against FC Mariupol.

He got again into the Quarterfinals of the Ukrainian Cup in the season 2019-20 for the third time in the history of the club.

In Premier League in the season 2019–20, with the club of Chernihiv, got the 4th place, through the play-offs for the Championship round table. On 26 February 2021 he scored his first goal with the team of Desna Chernihiv against Inhulets Petrove in Ukrainian Premier League at the Valeriy Lobanovskyi Dynamo Stadium ended 3-0 for Desna.

=== Metalist 1925 Kharkiv ===
In summer 2021 he signed for Metalist 1925 Kharkiv in Ukrainian Premier League where he played 16 matches.

=== Chornomorets Odesa ===
On 11 July 2022 Yermakov signed for Chornomorets Odesa. In June 2025, he extended his contract with the club for one year. Yermakov left the team on June 30, 2026.

=== Obolon Kyiv ===
On 8 July 2026, Yermakov signed for Obolon Kyiv in Ukrainian Premier League.

== Career statistics ==
=== Club ===
As of 16 October 2026

Appearances and goals by club, season and competition
Club	Season	League			Cup		Europe		Other		Total	
Club	Season	Division	Apps	Goals	Apps	Goals	Apps	Goals	Apps	Goals	Apps	Goals
Avanhard Kramatorsk
Avanhard Kramatorsk	2015–16	Ukrainian First League	11	0	0	0	0	0	0	0	11	0
Avanhard Kramatorsk	2016–17	Ukrainian First League	30	1	1	0	0	0	0	0	31	1
Avanhard Kramatorsk	2017–18	Ukrainian First League	21	2	1	0	0	0	0	0	22	2
Avanhard Kramatorsk	Total		62	3	2	0	0	0	0	0	64	3
Desna Chernihiv
Desna Chernihiv	2017–18	Ukrainian First League	10	0	0	0	0	0	0	0	10	0
Desna Chernihiv	2018–19	Ukrainian First League	7	0	0	0	0	0	0	0	7	0
Desna Chernihiv	Total		17	0	0	0	0	0	0	0	17	0
Avanhard Kramatorsk (loan)
Avanhard Kramatorsk (loan)	2018–19	Ukrainian First League	10	0	1	0	0	0	0	0	11	0
Avanhard Kramatorsk (loan)	Total		10	0	1	0	0	0	0	0	11	0
Desna Chernihiv
Desna Chernihiv	2018–19	Ukrainian Premier League	0	0	2	0	0	0	2	0	4	0
Desna Chernihiv	2019–20	Ukrainian Premier League	10	0	2	0	0	0	0	0	12	0
Desna Chernihiv	2020–21	Ukrainian Premier League	16	1	0	1	0	0	0	0	17	1
Desna Chernihiv	Total		26	1	4	0	0	0	2	0	32	1
Metalist 1925 Kharkiv
Metalist 1925 Kharkiv	2021–22	Ukrainian Premier League	16	0	1	0	0	0	0	0	17	1
Metalist 1925 Kharkiv	Total		16	0	1	0	0	0	0	0	17	1
Chornomorets Odesa
Chornomorets Odesa	2022–23	Ukrainian Premier League	25	3	0	0	0	0	0	0	25	3
Chornomorets Odesa	2023–24	Ukrainian Premier League	26	2	4	0	0	0	0	0	30	2
Chornomorets Odesa	2024–25	Ukrainian Premier League	21	0	0	0	0	0	0	0	21	0
Chornomorets Odesa	2025–26	Ukrainian First League	24	3	2	0	0	0	0	0	26	3
Chornomorets Odesa	Total		96	8	6	0	0	0	0	0	102	8
Obolon Kyiv
Obolon Kyiv	2026–27	Ukrainian Premier League	7	0	1	0	0	0	0	0	8	0
Total			7	0	1	0	0	0	0	0	8	0
Career total			234	12	15	0	0	0	2	0	251	13

== Honours ==
Chornomorets Odesa

- Ukrainian First League runner-up: 2025–26

Stal Alchevsk

- Ukrainian First League runner-up: 2012–13
