= Andriy Mostovyi =

Ukrainian footballer

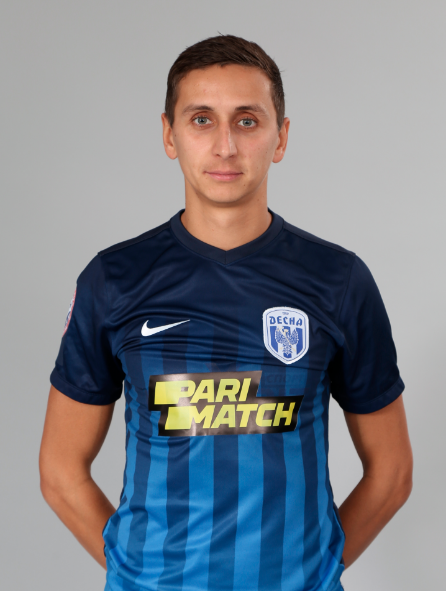

Personal information
- Full name: Andriy Volodymyrovych Mostovyi
- Date of birth: 24 January 1988 (age 38)
- Place of birth: Obukhiv, Kyiv Oblast, Ukrainian SSR
- Height: 1.81 m (5 ft 11 1/2 in)
- Position: Midfielder

Youth career
- 1994–2001: FC Obukhiv
- 2001–2002: RVUFK Kyiv
- 2002–2003: FC Skhid Kyiv
- 2003–2004: FC Lokomotyv Kyiv

Senior career*
Years	Team	Apps	(Gls)
2006–2008	Dnipro Cherkasy	18	(0)
2008	Knyazha Shchaslyve	30	(0)
2008	→ Knyazha-2 Shchaslyve	1	(0)
2009–2011	Lviv	42	(0)
2009–2010	→ Lviv-2	13	(2)
2011–2013	Arsenal Kyiv	0	(0)
2012–2013	→ Naftovyk-Ukrnafta Okhtyrka	16	(0)
2013–2016	Zirka Kirovohrad	73	(6)
2016–2021	Desna Chernihiv	138	(2)
2021–2022	Kryvbas Kryvyi Rih	12	(0)
2022	→ Shevardeni-1906 Tbilisi	8	(3)
2022–2023	FSV Duisburg	2	(0)

International career^{‡}
2006	Ukraine U18	2	(0)
- * Club domestic league appearances and goals as of 21 September 2022 ‡ National team caps and goals as of 15 September 2015

Andriy Mostovyi (Ukrainian: Андрій Володимирович Мостовий; born 24 January 1988) is a Ukrainian professional footballer who plays as a midfielder.

== Club ==
=== Desna Chernihiv ===
In 2016, Mostovyi moved to Desna Chernihiv and was promoted to the Ukrainian Premier League for the 2017–18 season.

In the 2019–20 Ukrainian First League season, he helped the team to fourth place in league, qualifying for the Europa League third qualifying round.

On 24 September 2020 Andriy Mostovyi was included in the team of Desna Chernihiv against VfL Wolfsburg for the Europa League third qualifying round at the AOK Stadion.

On 4 October 2020 he scored a goal against Shakhtar Donetsk at the Chernihiv Stadium for the Ukrainian Premier League in the season 2020-21.

In 2021 he left the club due his contract ended with the club of Chernihiv with big surprise of the Desna Chernihiv. He became part of one of the most successful times in the club's history. After that Volodymyr Levin, the president of Desna in an interview he explained the changes of the team and thank Monstovyi e other big players who left the club for the contribution to the team of Chernihiv for the last 3–4 years.

=== Hirnyk Kryvyi Rih ===
In June 2021 he moved to Hirnyk Kryvyi Rih, just promoted in Ukrainian First League. On 6 September 2021 he made his debut with the new club against Alians Lypova Dolyna in Ukrainian Premier League in the season 2021-22, replacing Dmytro Semenov at the 46 minute. On 20 February 2022 he played in the friendly match against Desna Chernihiv, his ex former club at the Asteria Football Center in Antalya.

=== Shevardeni-1906 Tbilisi (loan) ===
At the beginning of April 2022, he moved in Georgia to Shevardeni-1906 Tbilisi on loan, in Erovnuli Liga 2. On 16 April 2022, he scored against Rustavi and on 21 April 2022 he scored against WIT Georgia in Erovnuli Liga 2 in the season 2022. On 5 May 2022, he scored against Shukura Kobuleti at the Chele Arena in Erovnuli Liga 2 for the season 2022. In June 2022 he return to Hirnyk Kryvyi Rih and his contract with the club was ended.

== National team ==
In 2006, he was called up to play for the 23-man squad of the Ukraine U18.

== Career statistics ==
=== Club ===
As of match played 21 October 2022

Appearances and goals by club, season and competition
Club	Season	League			Cup		Europe		Other		Total	
Club	Season	Division	Apps	Goals	Apps	Goals	Apps	Goals	Apps	Goals	Apps	Goals
Dnipro Cherkasy	2005–06	Ukrainian Second League	1	0	0	0	0	0	0	0	1	0
Dnipro Cherkasy	2006–07	Ukrainian First League	16	0	0	0	0	0	0	0	16	0
Cherkasy-2	2006–07	Ukrainian First League	5	1	0	0	0	0	0	0	5	1
Dnipro Cherkasy	2007–08	Ukrainian First League	1	0	0	0	0	0	0	0	1	0
Knyazha Shchaslyve	2007–08	Ukrainian Second League	13	0	0	0	0	0	0	0	13	0
Knyazha Shchaslyve	2008–09	Ukrainian First League	17	0	1	0	0	0	0	0	18	0
Knyazha-2 Shchaslyve (loan)	2008–09	Ukrainian Second League	1	0	0	0	0	0	0	0	1	0
Lviv	2009–10	Ukrainian Premier League	0	0	0	0	0	0	0	0	0	0
Lviv-2	2009–10	Ukrainian Second League	13	2	0	0	0	0	0	0	13	2
Lviv	2010–11	Ukrainian First League	26	0	0	0	0	0	0	0	26	0
Arsenal Kyiv	2011–12	Ukrainian Premier League	0	0	0	0	0	0	0	0	0	0
Arsenal Kyiv	2012–13	Ukrainian Premier League	0	0	0	0	0	0	0	0	0	0
Naftovyk Okhtyrka (loan)	2012–13	Ukrainian First League	15	0	1	0	0	0	0	0	16	0
Zirka Kropyvnytskyi	2013–14	Ukrainian First League	28	3	2	0	0	0	0	0	30	2
Zirka Kropyvnytskyi	2014–15	Ukrainian First League	20	0	1	0	0	0	0	0	21	0
Zirka Kropyvnytskyi	2015–16	Ukrainian First League	19	3	3	0	0	0	0	0	22	3
Desna Chernihiv	2016-17	Ukrainian First League	32	0	3	0	0	0	0	0	35	0
Desna Chernihiv	2017–18	Ukrainian First League	33	1	2	0	0	0	0	0	35	1
Desna Chernihiv	2018–19	Ukrainian Premier League	24	0	2	0	0	0	0	0	26	0
Desna Chernihiv	2019–20	Ukrainian Premier League	29	0	1	0	0	0	0	0	30	0
Desna Chernihiv	2020–21	Ukrainian Premier League	20	1	2	0	0	0	0	0	22	1
Kryvbas Kryvyi Rih	2021-22	Ukrainian First League	12	0	0	0	0	0	0	0	12	0
Shevardeni-1906 Tbilisi (loan)	2022	Erovnuli Liga 2	8	3	0	0	0	0	0	0	8	3
FSV Duisburg	2022-23	Oberliga Niederrhein	2	0	0	0	0	0	0	0	2	0
Career total			335	14	18	0	0	0	0	0	353	14

=== International ===
Ukraine-18
Year	Apps	Goals
2006	2	0
Total	2	0

== Honours ==
Desna Chernihiv

- Ukrainian First League: 2017–18

Zirka Kropyvnytskyi

- Ukrainian First League: 2015–16

Knyazha Shchaslyve

- Ukrainian Second League: 2007–08

Dnipro Cherkasy

- Ukrainian Second League: 2005–06
