= Luka Koberidze =

Georgian footballer

Personal information
- Full name: Luka Koberidze
- Date of birth: 9 September 1994 (age 32)
- Place of birth: Tbilisi, Georgia
- Height: 1.80 m (5 ft 11 in)
- Position: Midfielder

Team information
- Current team: Odishi 1919
- Number: 19

Youth career
- 200?–2012: Baia Zugdidi

Senior career*
Years	Team	Apps	(Gls)
2012–2015	Zugdidi	29	(0)
2015	Guria Lanchkhuti	13	(0)
2016–2018	Desna Chernihiv	69	(1)
2019	Metalist 1925 Kharkiv	7	(0)
2019	Torpedo Kutaisi	0	(0)
2020	Shevardeni-1906 Tbilisi	12	(2)
2021–2022	VPK-Ahro Shevchenkivka	28	(1)
2022	Sioni Bolnisi	9	(0)
2022	Riteriai	5	(0)
2023	Marijampolė City	9	(1)
2024	Khosilot Farkhor	3	(0)
2025–	Odishi 1919	23	(0)
- * Club domestic league appearances and goals as of 21 November 2026

Luka Koberidze (Georgian: ლუკა კობერიძე; born 9 September 1994) is a Georgian professional footballer who plays as a midfielder for Odishi 1919.

== Career ==
Koberidze is a product of the FC Baia Zugdidi academy and played in the Georgian Erovnuli Liga until January 2016.

=== Desna Chernihiv ===
In 2016 he signed a three-year contract with Desna Chernihiv in the Ukrainian First League. With Desna he won the 2017–18 Ukrainian First League. After a disagreement with the player, the club decided not to extend his contract.

=== Metalist 1925 Kharkiv and Torpedo Kutaisi ===
In April 2019 he moved to Metalist 1925 Kharkiv in the Ukrainian First League, making only seven appearances before moving to Torpedo Kutaisi in the same season.

=== Shevardeni-1906 Tbilisi and VPK-Ahro Shevchenkivka ===
In 2020, Koberidze signed with Shevardeni-1906 Tbilisi for half a season, making 12 appearances. On 29 January 2021, though, he moved to VPK-Ahro Shevchenkivka in the Ukrainian First League. On 25 October he scored against Hirnyk-Sport Horishni Plavni.

=== Sioni Bolnisi ===
In April 2022 he moved to Georgian side Sioni Bolnisi in the Erovnuli Liga. On 14 April he made his debut against Torpedo Kutaisi at the Tamaz Stepania Stadium in Bolnisi.

=== Riteriai ===
In summer 2022, he moved to Riteriai in A Lyga for the 2022 season.

=== Marijampolė City ===
In February 2023 he moved to Marijampolė City. On 8 April he scored his first goal for Marijampolė City against Ekranas.

=== Khosilot Farkhor ===
On 12 July 2024, Tajikistan Higher League club Khosilot Farkhor announced the signing of Koberidze to a six-month contract.

== Career statistics ==
=== Club ===
As of match played 21 November 2026

Appearances and goals by club, season and competition
Club	Season	League			Cup		Europe		Other		Total	
Club	Season	Division	Apps	Goals	Apps	Goals	Apps	Goals	Apps	Goals	Apps	Goals
Zugdidi	2012–13	Umaglesi Liga	4	0	0	0	0	0	0	0	4	0
Zugdidi	2013–14	Umaglesi Liga	3	0	0	0	0	0	0	0	3	0
Zugdidi	2014–15	Umaglesi Liga	22	0	0	0	0	0	0	0	22	0
Guria	2015–16	Umaglesi Liga	13	0	3	0	0	0	0	0	16	0
Desna Chernihiv	2015–16	Ukrainian First League	8	0	0	0	0	0	0	0	8	0
Desna Chernihiv	2016–17	Ukrainian First League	26	1	1	0	0	0	0	0	27	1
Desna Chernihiv	2017–18	Ukrainian First League	26	0	3	1	0	0	0	0	29	1
Desna Chernihiv	2018–19	Ukrainian Premier League	11	0	0	0	0	0	0	0	11	0
Metalist 1925 Kharkiv	2018–19	Ukrainian First League	6	0	0	0	0	0	0	0	6	0
Torpedo Kutaisi	2019	Erovnuli Liga	0	0	0	0	0	0	0	0	0	0
Shevardeni-1906 Tbilisi	2020	Erovnuli Liga 2	12	2	0	0	0	0	0	0	12	2
VPK-Ahro Shevchenkivka	2020–21	Ukrainian First League	14	0	0	0	0	0	0	0	14	0
VPK-Ahro Shevchenkivka	2021–22	Ukrainian First League	14	1	3	0	0	0	0	0	17	1
Sioni Bolnisi	2022	Erovnuli Liga	9	0	0	0	0	0	0	0	9	0
FK Riteriai	2022	A Lyga	5	0	0	0	0	0	0	0	5	0
Marijampolė City	2023	I Lyga	9	1	0	0	0	0	0	0	9	1
Khosilot Farkhor	2024	Tajikistan Higher League	3	0	0	0	0	0	0	0	3	0
Odishi 1919	2025	Liga 3	0	0	1	0	0	0	0	0	1	0
Odishi 1919	2026	Erovnuli Liga 2	23	0	2	0	0	0	0	0	25	0
Career total			209	5	12	0	0	0	0	0	221	6

== Honours ==
Desna Chernihiv

- Ukrainian First League: 2017–18
