= Vyacheslav Akimov =

Ukrainian footballer

Personal information
- Full name: Vyacheslav Valeriyovych Akimov
- Date of birth: 17 October 1989 (age 37)
- Place of birth: Odesa, Ukrainian SSR
- Height: 1.90 m (6 ft 3 in)
- Position: Midfielder

Youth career
- 2002–2006: Youth Sportive School #9 Odesa

Senior career*
Years	Team	Apps	(Gls)
2007	FC Helios Kharkiv	6	(0)
2008	MFC Mykolaiv	16	(0)
2008–2009	FC Knyazha Shchaslyve	7	(0)
2009	FC Vorskla Poltava	0	(0)
2009–2010	FC Hoverla Uzhhorod	0	(0)
2010–2011	FC Tarutino (Amateur)	?	(?)
2011	FC Enerhetyk Burshtyn	5	(0)
2011–2012	FC Volyn Lutsk	1	(0)
2012–2014	FC Shakhtar-3 Donetsk	43	(6)
2014	FC Veris	5	(0)
2015	FC Hoverla Uzhhorod	4	(0)
2015	FC Illichivets Mariupol	6	(1)
2016–2017	FC Desna Chernihiv	3	(0)
2017-2018	FC Zhemchuzhyna Odesa	21	(1)
2021–2022	FC Viktoriya Mykolaivka	15	(1)
- * Club domestic league appearances and goals

Vyacheslav Valeriiovych Akimov (Ukrainian: В'ячеслав Валерійович Акімов, romanized: Viacheslav Valeriiovych Akimov; born 17 October 1989 in Odesa, Ukrainian SSR) is a professional Ukrainian football midfielder who played for FC Desna Chernihiv in the Ukrainian First League.

== Career ==
Akimov is product of Youth Sportive School #9 Odesa.

He made his début in the Ukrainian Premier League, played for FC Volyn Lutsk in the game against FC Obolon Kyiv on 26 August 2012.
