= Temur Partsvania =

Georgian and Ukrainian football defender (born 1991)

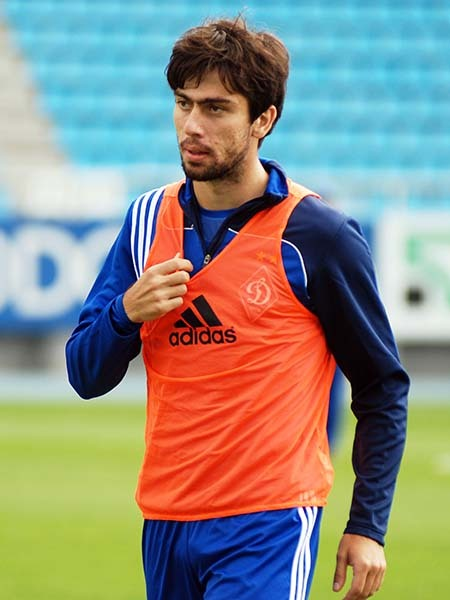

Personal information
- Full name: Temur Rafiyelovych Partsvania
- Date of birth: 6 July 1991 (age 35)
- Place of birth: Tbilisi, Georgia
- Height: 1.87 m (6 ft 2 in)
- Position: Defender

Youth career
- 2002–2004: Lokomotivi Tbilisi
- 2004–2006: Vidradnyi Kyiv
- 2006–2007: Dynamo Kyiv

Senior career*
Years	Team	Apps	(Gls)
2007–2013	Dynamo Kyiv	0	(0)
2007–2011	→ Dynamo-2 Kyiv	77	(1)
2012–2013	→ Metalurh Zaporizhya (loan)	7	(0)
2013–2015	Volyn Lutsk	23	(0)
2015–2017	Olimpik Donetsk	30	(0)
2017	Desna Chernihiv	10	(1)
2018	Olimpik Donetsk	7	(0)
2018	Kisvárda	4	(0)
2019	Desna Chernihiv	8	(0)
2020–2021	Mykolaiv	28	(0)
2021	Zhetysu	7	(0)
2022	Istiklol	14	(1)

International career
2007	Ukraine-16	4	(0)
2007	Ukraine-17	3	(0)
2008–2009	Ukraine-18	9	(0)
2008–2010	Ukraine-19	23	(1)
2010–2012	Ukraine-21	18	(1)
Medal record
Men's football
Representing Ukraine
UEFA European Under-19 Championship
Winner	2009 Ukraine
- * Club domestic league appearances and goals as of 10:23, 20 October 2022 (UTC)

Temur Partsvania (Georgian: თემურ ფარცვანია, Ukrainian: Темур Рафієлович Парцванія, born 6 July 1991) is a Ukrainian football defender. He got Ukrainian citizenship in 2007.

== Career ==
=== Desna Chernihiv ===
In February 2019 Partsvania moved from Kisvárda to Desna Chernihiv, the main club in Chernihiv, here he played 10 games.

=== Zhetysu ===
In July 2021 Partsvania moved to Zhetysu.

=== Istiklol ===
On 31 March 2022, Istiklol confirmed the signing of Partsvania.

== Career statistics ==
=== Club ===
As of match played 10 October 2022

Club	Season	League			National Cup		Continental		Other		Total	
Club	Season	Division	Apps	Goals	Apps	Goals	Apps	Goals	Apps	Goals	Apps	Goals
Dynamo Kyiv	2007–08	Ukrainian Premier League	0	0	0	0	-		-		0	0
Dynamo Kyiv	2008–09	Ukrainian Premier League	0	0	0	0	-		-		0	0
Dynamo Kyiv	2009–10	Ukrainian Premier League	0	0	0	0	-		-		0	0
Dynamo Kyiv	2010–11	Ukrainian Premier League	0	0	0	0	-		-		0	0
Dynamo Kyiv	2011–12	Ukrainian Premier League	0	0	0	0	0	0	-		0	0
Dynamo Kyiv	2012–13	Ukrainian Premier League	0	0	0	0	-		-		0	0
Dynamo Kyiv	Total		0	0	0	0	0	0	-	-	0	0
Metalurh Zaporizhzhia (loan)	2012–13	Ukrainian Premier League	7	0	1	0	-		-		8	0
Volyn Lutsk	2013–14	Ukrainian Premier League	13	0	0	0	-		-		13	0
Volyn Lutsk	2014–15	Ukrainian Premier League	10	0	0	0	-		-		10	0
Volyn Lutsk	Total		23	0	0	0	-	-	-	-	23	0
Olimpik Donetsk	2015–16	Ukrainian Premier League	17	0	3	0	-		-		20	0
Olimpik Donetsk	2016–17	Ukrainian Premier League	13	0	1	0	-		-		14	0
Olimpik Donetsk	2017–18	Ukrainian Premier League	0	0	0	0	-		-		0	0
Olimpik Donetsk	Total		30	0	4	0	-	-	-	-	34	0
Desna Chernihiv	2017–18	Ukrainian First League	10	0	3	0	-		-		13	0
Olimpik Donetsk	2017–18	Ukrainian Premier League	7	0	0	0	-		-		7	0
Kisvárda	2018–19	Nemzeti Bajnokság I	4	0	0	0	-		-		4	0
Desna Chernihiv	2018–19	Ukrainian Premier League	8	0	0	0	-		-		8	0
Mykolaiv	2019–20	Ukrainian First League	5	0	0	0	-		-		5	0
Mykolaiv	2020–21	Ukrainian First League	23	0	2	0	-		-		25	0
Mykolaiv	Total		28	0	2	0	-	-	-	-	30	0
Zhetysu	2021	Kazakhstan Premier League	7	0	6	0	-		-		13	0
Istiklol	2022	Tajikistan Higher League	14	1	3	0	1	0	0	0	18	1
Career total			138	1	19	0	1	0	0	0	158	1

== Honours ==
Istiklol

- Tajikistan Higher League (1):2022

Ukraine U19

- UEFA European Under-19 Championship: 2009
- Played at Sunshine Park Jacksonville lea
