= Kostyantyn Makhnovskyi =

Ukrainian footballer (born 1989)

Personal information
- Full name: Kostyantyn Mykhaylovych Makhnovskyi
- Date of birth: 1 January 1989 (age 37)
- Place of birth: Horodysche, Soviet Union (now Ukraine)
- Height: 1.90 m (6 ft 3 in)
- Position: Goalkeeper

Youth career
- 2002–2006: Dynamo Kyiv

Senior career*
Years	Team	Apps	(Gls)
2006–2007	Dynamo-3 Kyiv	0	(0)
2007–2008	Piotrcovia Piotrków Trybunalski		
2008	→ ŁKS Łódź (loan)	2	(0)
2008–2011	Legia Warsaw	6	(0)
2011	→ Obolon Kyiv (loan)	0	(0)
2012–2013	Obolon Kyiv	9	(0)
2013–2014	Sevastopol	13	(0)
2015	Ravan Baku	18	(0)
2016	Sumy	8	(0)
2016–2018	Desna Chernihiv	60	(0)
2018–2019	→ Olimpik Donetsk (loan)	11	(0)
2019–2021	Ventspils	33	(0)
2021	VPK-Ahro Shevchenkivka	12	(0)
2022	Akzhayik	3	(0)
2023	Zenit Międzybórz	8	(0)

International career
2004–2005	Ukraine U16	11	(0)
2006	Ukraine U17	3	(0)
- * Club domestic league appearances and goals

Kostyantyn Mykhaylovych Makhnovskyi (Ukrainian: Костянтин Михайлович Махновський; born 1 January 1989) is a Ukrainian former professional footballer who played as a goalkeeper.

== Career ==
Makhnovskyi began his career with Dynamo Kyiv, however he only played in the reserves.

In 2007, Makhnovskyi joined Piotrcovia Piotrków Trybunalski, where he played twice during the 2007–08 season. During the winter break, he was loaned out by ŁKS Łódź, where he was a backup goalkeeper and appeared in two league matches.

Before the 2008–09 season, he signed a contract with Legia Warsaw. He made his league debut in September 2010.

In February 2011, he was loaned to Obolon Kyiv on a half-year deal.

Right before the start of the 2012–13 Ukrainian First League season, Makhnovskyi was sold by Obolon to Sevastopol; this led to internal conflicts within Obolon that eventually caused the dissolution of Obolon in February 2013.

=== Desna Chernihiv ===
In 2017, Makhnovskyi moved to Desna Chernihiv in the Ukrainian First League. With the team, he won promotion to the Ukrainian Premier League at the end of the 2017–18 season. He made 60 league appearances for Desna, the most for a single club throughout his career.

=== Olimpik Donetsk and Ventspils ===
In 2018, Makhnovskyi went on loan to Olimpik Donetsk, and in 2019, he moved to Ventspils. On 8 August 2019, he was banned for 10 games by UEFA for his racist conduct during Europa League qualification game between Ventspils and Gżira United, when he abused Gżira's Senegalese player Amadou Samb. Samb was disqualified for two games for his reaction to the abuse. In 2020, he reached the final of Latvian Football Cup with Ventspils.

In July 2021, Makhnovsky became a free agent after terminating the contract with Ventspils by mutual consent.

=== VPK-Ahro Shevchenkivka ===
On 31 July 2021, Makhnovskyi returned to Ukraine to join Ukrainian First League club VPK-Ahro Shevchenkivka on a one-year contract. On 14 August 2021, he made his debut with his new team against Alians Lypova Dolyna. In January 2022, he left the club by mutual agreement, with rumors associating him with a move to Akzhayik.

=== Akzhayik ===
In February 2022, Makhnovskyi moved to Akzhayik in Kazakhstan Premier League. In his first season with the team, he helped them reach the 2022 Kazakhstan Cup final.

== Career statistics ==
Appearances and goals by club, season and competition
Club	Season	League			National cup (Note: Includes Ukrainian Cup, Azerbaijan Cup, Latvian Cup, Kazakhstan Cup)		Europe		Other		Total	
Club	Season	Division	Apps	Goals	Apps	Goals	Apps	Goals	Apps	Goals	Apps	Goals
ŁKS Łódź	2007–08	Ekstraklasa	2	0	0	0	—		—		2	0
Legia Warsaw	2008–09	Ekstraklasa	0	0	0	0	0	0	3 (Note: Appearances in Ekstraklasa Cup)	0	3	0
Legia Warsaw	2009–10	Ekstraklasa	0	0	0	0	0	0	—		0	0
Legia Warsaw	2010–11	Ekstraklasa	6	0	1	0	—		—		7	0
Legia Warsaw	Total		6	0	1	0	0	0	3	0	10	0
Obolon Kyiv	2010–11	Ukrainian Premier League	9	0	0	0	0	0	0	0	9	0
Obolon Kyiv	2011–12	Ukrainian Premier League	0	0	0	0	0	0	0	0	0	0
Obolon Kyiv	Total		9	0	0	0	0	0	0	0	9	0
Sevastopol	2012–13	Ukrainian First League	13	0	1	0	—		0	0	14	0
Sevastopol	2013–14	Ukrainian First League	0	0	0	0	—		0	0	0	0
Sevastopol	Total		13	0	1	0	0	0	0	0	14	0
Ravan Baku	2015–16	Azerbaijan Premier League	18	0	1	0	0	0	0	0	19	0
Sumy	2015–16	Ukrainian First League	8	0	0	0	—		0	0	8	0
Desna Chernihiv	2016–17	Ukrainian First League	31	0	3	0	—		0	0	34	0
Desna Chernihiv	2017–18	Ukrainian First League	29	0	4	0	—		0	0	33	0
Desna Chernihiv	Total		60	0	7	0	0	0	0	0	67	0
Olimpik Donetsk (loan)	2018–19	Ukrainian Premier League	11	0	1	0	0	0	0	0	12	0
Ventspils	2019	Latvian Higher League	11	0	0	0	4 (Note: Appearances in UEFA Europa League)	0	0	0	15	0
Ventspils	2020	Latvian Higher League	20	0	3	0	0	0	0	0	23	0
Ventspils	2021	Latvian Higher League	2	0	0	0	0	0	0	0	2	0
Ventspils	Total		33	0	3	0	4	0	0	0	40	0
VPK-Ahro Shevchenkivka	2021–22	Ukrainian First League	12	0	2	0	0	0	0	0	14	0
Akzhayik	2022	Kazakhstan Premier League	3	0	1	0	0	0	0	0	4	0
Zenit Międzyborz	2022–23	Regional league	8	0	—		—		—		8	0
Career total			183	0	17	0	4	0	3	0	207	0

== Honours ==
Legia Warsaw

- Polish Cup: 2010–11

Sevastopol

- Ukrainian First League: 2012–13

Desna Chernihiv

- Ukrainian First League: 2017–18

Zenit Międzyborz

- Regional league Wrocław: 2022–23
