= Serhiy Melashenko =

Ukrainian footballer

Personal information
- Full name: Serhiy Yuriyovych Melashenko
- Date of birth: 16 August 1996 (age 30)
- Place of birth: Chernihiv, Ukraine
- Height: 1.90 m (6 ft 3 in)
- Position: Goalkeeper

Youth career
- 2015: Yunist Chernihiv

Senior career*
Years	Team	Apps	(Gls)
2015	LKT Chernihiv	7	(0)
2016	Zernoprom Anysiv	1	(0)
2016–2018	Desna Chernihiv	1	(0)
2018	→ Mynai (loan)	11	(0)
2019	→ Hirnyk Kryvyi Rih (loan)	4	(0)
2020–2021	Nevėžis	44	(0)
2022	Riteriai	27	(0)
2023–2025	TransINVEST	12	(0)
- * Club domestic league appearances and goals as of 20 September 2025

Serhiy Yuriyovych Melashenko (Ukrainian: Сергій Юрійович Мелашенко; born 10 August 1996) is a Ukrainian professional footballer who plays as a goalkeeper.

== Career ==
Makhnovskyi began his career with Yunist Chernihiv. The sports school is known for its talent players like Andriy Yarmolenko, Nika Sichinava. Melashenko, played also in LKT Chernihiv and in Chernihiv kulikovka.

=== Desna Chernihiv ===
In 2016 he moved to Desna Chernihiv the main club in the city of Chernihiv in Ukrainian First League. With the team he was promoted in Ukrainian Premier League. On 19 May 2018, he made his debut against Helios Kharkiv at the Chernihiv Stadium in Chernihiv replacing Kostyantyn Makhnovskyi.

=== Mynai ===
On 27 August 2018 he moved to Mynai, where he played 11 matches in the season.

=== Hirnyk Kryvyi Rih ===
In 2019, he moved to Hirnyk Kryvyi Rih in Ukrainian Second League where in the season 2018–19 he got third place.

=== Nevėžis ===
In 2021 he moved to Nevėžis, based in the city of Kėdainiai in Lithuania and playing in A Lyga. In 2021, he made 17 appearances with the club in A Lyga.

=== Riteriai ===
In February 2022 he signed with Lithuanian FK Riteriai.

=== TransINVEST ===
In 2023 he moved to TransINVEST where he heped the club the club to win the I Lyga and the Lithuanian Football Cup.

== Personal life ==
His father Yuriy Melashenko was a coach of Yunist Chernihiv and a football goalkeeper of Desna Chernihiv.

== Honours ==
TransINVEST

- I Lyga: 2023
- Lithuanian Football Cupː2023

Nevėžis

- I Lyga: 2020

Mynai

- Ukrainian Second League: 2018–19

Desna Chernihiv

- Ukrainian First League: 2017–18
