= Ihor Lytovka =

Ukrainian footballer (born 1988)

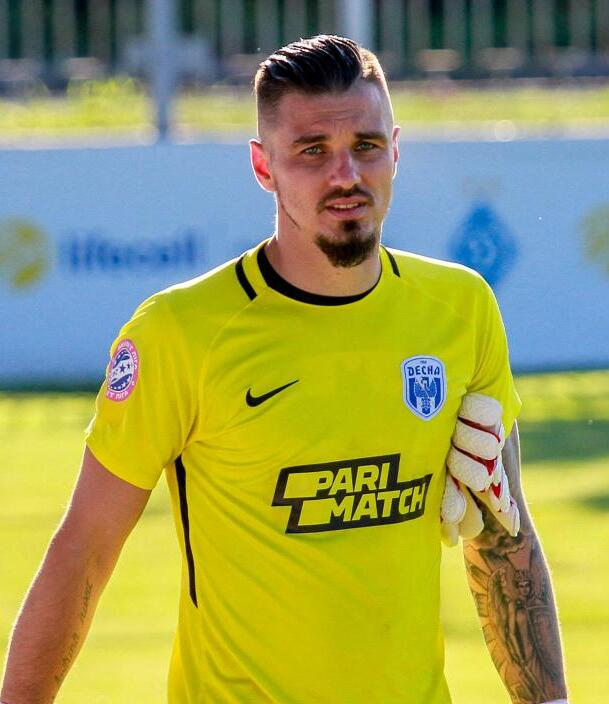
- Igor Lytovka with Desna Chernihiv

Personal information
- Full name: Ihor Yuriyovych Lytovka
- Date of birth: 5 June 1988 (age 38)
- Place of birth: Nikopol, Ukrainian SSR
- Height: 1.87 m (6 ft 2 in)
- Position: Goalkeeper

Team information
- Current team: Varnsdorf
- Number: 33

Youth career
- 2001–2002: Kolos Nikopol
- 2002–2006: FC Obriy Nikopol

Senior career*
Years	Team	Apps	(Gls)
2006	Elektrometalurh-NZF Nikopol	1	(0)
2007–2014	Sevastopol	93	(0)
2009	→ Tavriya Simferopol (loan)	0	(0)
2014–2015	Olimpik Donetsk	13	(0)
2015	Voluntari	2	(0)
2016	Riga	23	(0)
2017–2022	Desna Chernihiv	37	(0)
2022	Zagora Unešić	0	(0)
2023–2024	Andijon	36	(0)
2025–	Gagra	0	(0)
2025–	Varnsdorf	11	(0)
- * Club domestic league appearances and goals as of 23 November 2025

Ihor Lytovka (Ukrainian: Ігор Юрійович Литовка; born 5 June 1988) is a Ukrainian professional footballer who plays as a goalkeeper for Varnsdorf.

== Career ==
=== Sevastopol ===
In 2007 he moved to Sevastopol and he won the Ukrainian First League of the season one season and he got promoted to the Ukrainian Premier League.

=== Tavriya Simferopol (Loan) ===
He was on loan in Tavriya Simferopol in the Ukrainian Premier League, but not played for main squad.

=== Olimpik Donetsk ===
In 2014, he moved to Olimpik Donetsk, where he riched the semifinal of Ukrainian Cup in the season 2014–15.

=== Voluntari ===
In 2015, he played for Voluntari in Romania in Liga II and with the club he won the competition in the season 2014–15.

=== Riga ===
In 2016 he moved from FC Voluntari to Riga in Latvia where he got into the final of the Latvian Cup in the season 2016–17.

=== Desna Chernihiv ===
In winter transfer 2016–17, he signed for Desna Chernihiv and he got promoted to Ukrainian Premier League in the season 2017–18 where he played 11 matches. In summer 2018, after the arrival at the club of Yevhen Past, he become the second goalkeeper of the club of Chernihiv. On 30 October 2019 he played in Ukrainian Cup against MFC Mykolaiv where Desna Chernihiv won 4–2 away at the Tsentralnyi Miskyi Stadion. With the club of Chernihiv he also qualified for the Europa League third qualifying round where he played 5 matches in Ukrainian Premier League in the season 2019–20. On 15 August 2020 he extended his contract with Desna

He played against Rukh Lviv in Desna's first match of 2020–21 Ukrainian Cup, in which the club won 2–1 and qualified for the Round 16.

=== Zagora Unešić ===
On 26 August 2022 he moved to Zagora Unešić in Croatia.

=== Andijon ===
In February 2023 he signed two-year contract with Andijon in Uzbekistan Super League. In 2024 he won the Uzbekistan Cup in 2024.

=== Gagra & Varnsdorf ===
He moved to Gagra without playing and then moved to Varnsdorf, in Czech Republic.

== Personal life ==
In March 2022, his wife gave birth to a daughter named Mia.

== Outside of professional football ==
In March 2022, during the Siege of Chernihiv, Lytovka, together with other Desna's ex-players like Andriy Totovytskyi, Yevhen Selin, Vladyslav Kalitvintsev, Yehor Kartushov, Pylyp Budkivskyi, Levan Arveladze, Andriy Dombrovskyi, Oleksandr Filippov, Artem Favorov and Denys Favorov, transferred money for the civilian population of the city of Chernihiv.

== Career statistics ==
=== Club ===
As of match played 5 March 2026

Appearances and goals by club, season and competition
Club	Season	League			Cup		Europe		Other		Total	
Club	Season	Division	Apps	Goals	Apps	Goals	Apps	Goals	Apps	Goals	Apps	Goals
Sevastopol	2007–08	Ukrainian Premier League	2	0	2	0	0	0	0	0	4	0
Sevastopol	2008–09	Ukrainian Premier League	2	0	2	0	0	0	0	0	4	0
Sevastopol	2009–10	Ukrainian Premier League	10	0	0	0	0	0	0	0	10	0
Sevastopol	2010–11	Ukrainian Premier League	2	0	1	0	0	0	0	0	3	0
Sevastopol	2011–12	Ukrainian Premier League	33	0	1	0	0	0	0	0	31	0
Sevastopol	2012–13	Ukrainian Premier League	14	0	3	0	0	0	0	0	17	0
Sevastopol	2013–14	Ukrainian Premier League	17	0	2	0	0	0	0	0	19	0
Olimpik Donetsk	2014–15	Ukrainian Premier League	13	0	2	0	0	0	0	0	15	0
Voluntari	2014–15	Liga II	2	0	0	0	0	0	0	0	2	0
Riga	2016	Latvian Higher League	21	0	0	0	0	0	0	0	21	0
Desna Chernihiv	2017–18	Ukrainian First League	5	0	2	0	0	0	0	0	7	0
Desna Chernihiv	2018–19	Ukrainian Premier League	11	0	2	0	0	0	0	0	12	0
Desna Chernihiv	2019–20	Ukrainian Premier League	2	0	2	0	0	0	0	0	4	0
Desna Chernihiv	2020–21	Ukrainian Premier League	6	0	1	0	0	0	2 (Note: Two appearances in Friendly match)	0	9	0
Desna Chernihiv	2021-22	Ukrainian Premier League	13	0	0	0	0	0	0	0	13	0
Zagora Unešić	2022-23	Treća HNL	0	0	0	0	0	0	0	0	0	0
Andijon	2023	Uzbekistan Super League	24	0	2	0	0	0	0	0	26	0
Andijon	2024	Uzbekistan Super League	12	0	4	0	0	0	0	0	16	0
Gagra	2025	Erovnuli Liga	0	0	0	0	0	0	0	0	0	0
Varnsdorf	2025–26	Bohemian Football League	11	0	1	0	0	0	0	0	12	0
Career total			200	0	28	0	0	0	2	0	215	0

== Honours ==
Andijon

- Uzbekistan Cup: 2024

Desna Chernihiv

- Ukrainian First League: 2017–18

Riga

- Latvian Cup Runners-up:2016–17

Sevastopol

- Ukrainian First League: (2) 2009–10, 2012–13

Voluntari

- Liga II:2014–15

== Gallery ==
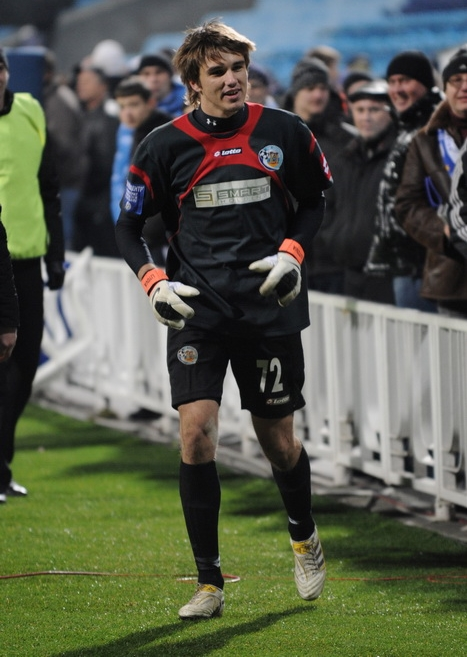
Igor Lytovka with Sevastopol

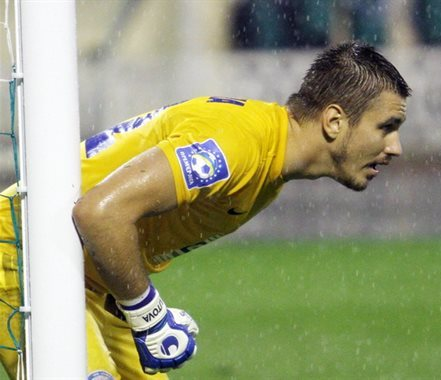
Igor Lytovka with Sevastopol

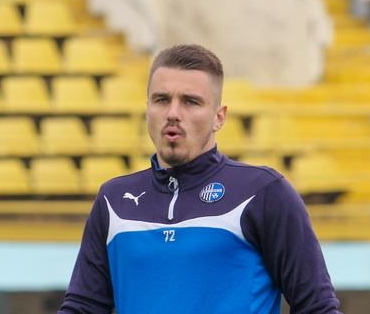
Igor Lytovka with Olimpik Donetsk

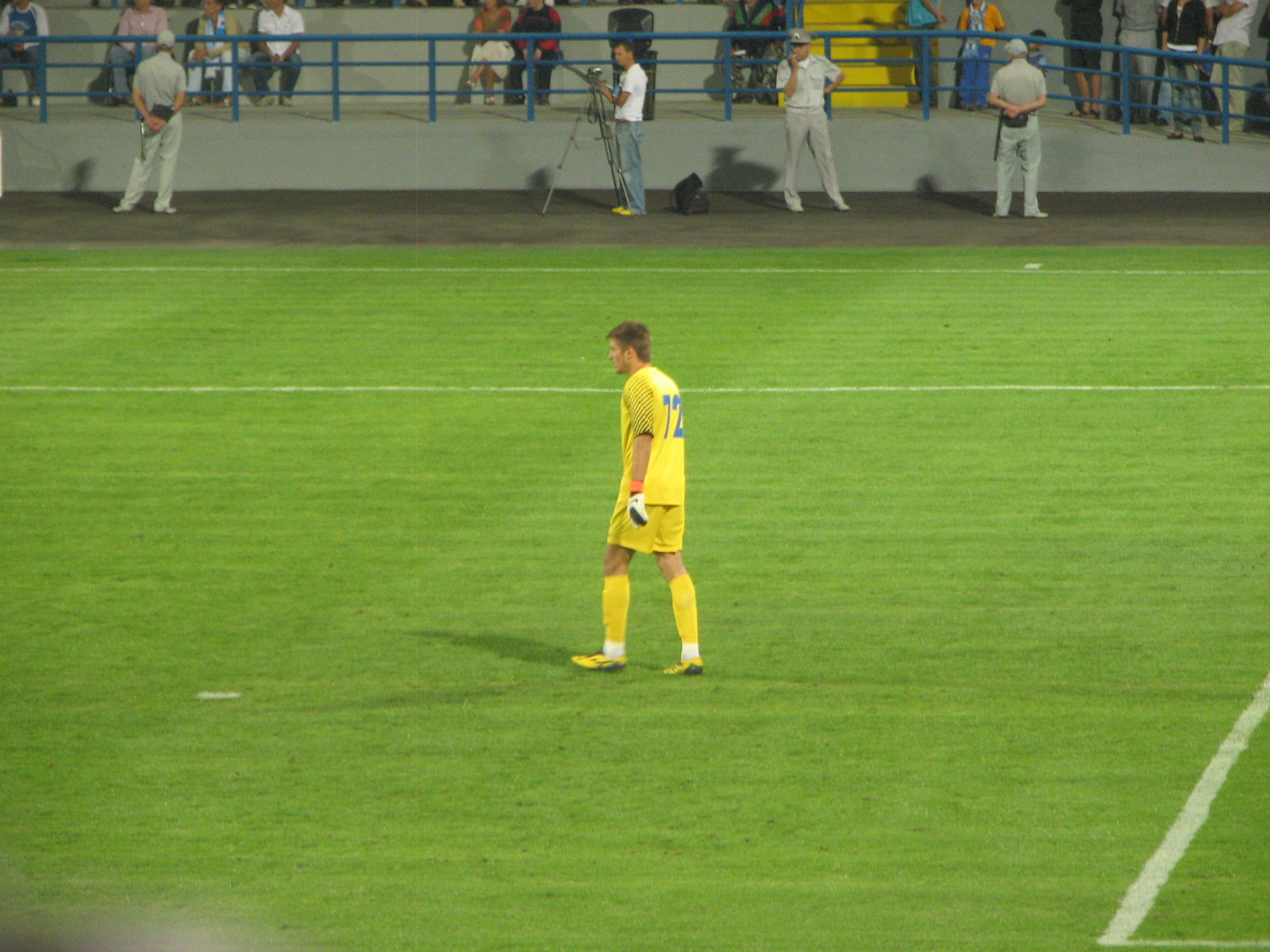
Igor Lytovka with Sevastopol

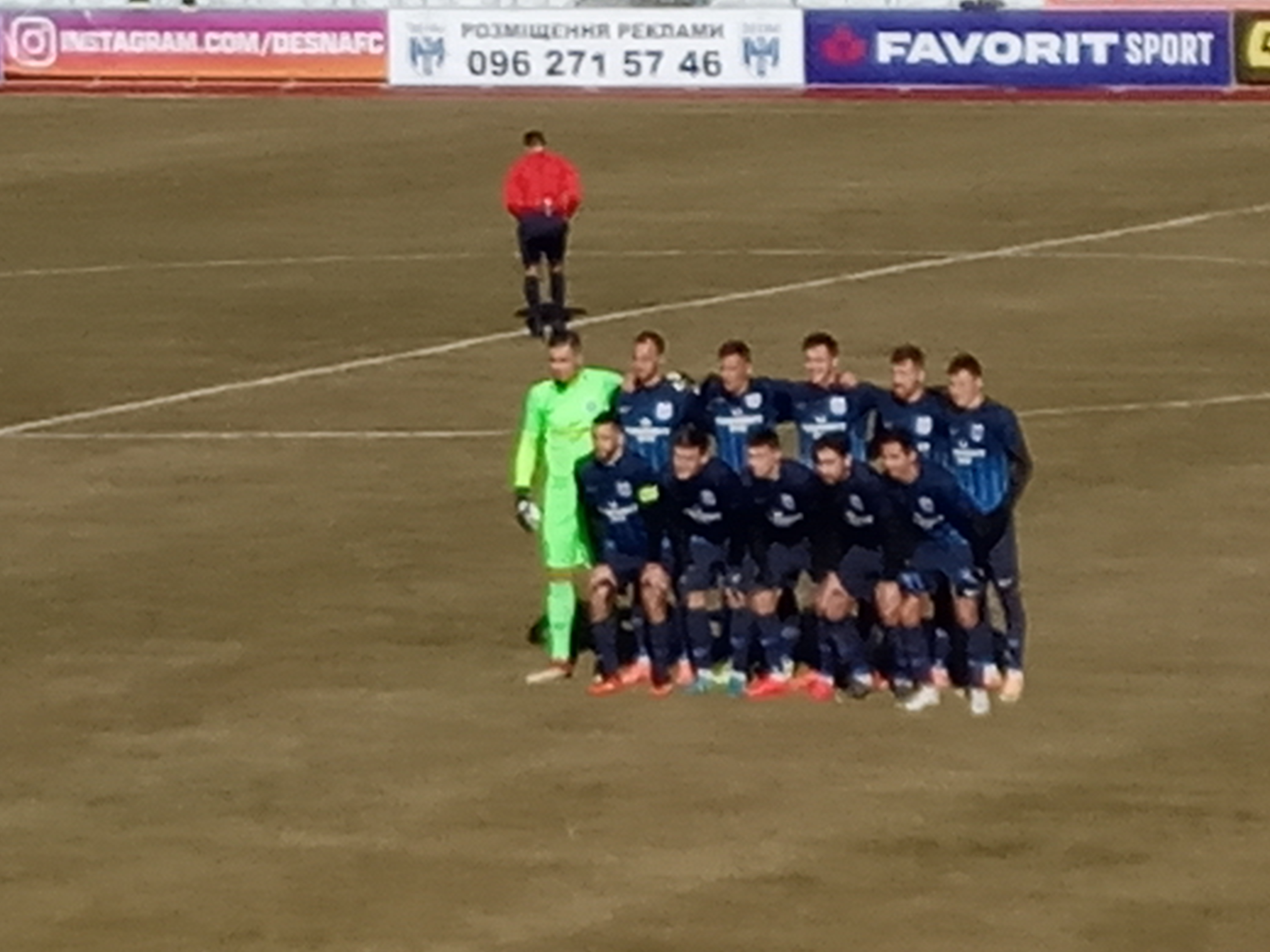
Igor Lytovka with Desna Chernihiv
