= Denys Halenkov =

Ukrainian footballer

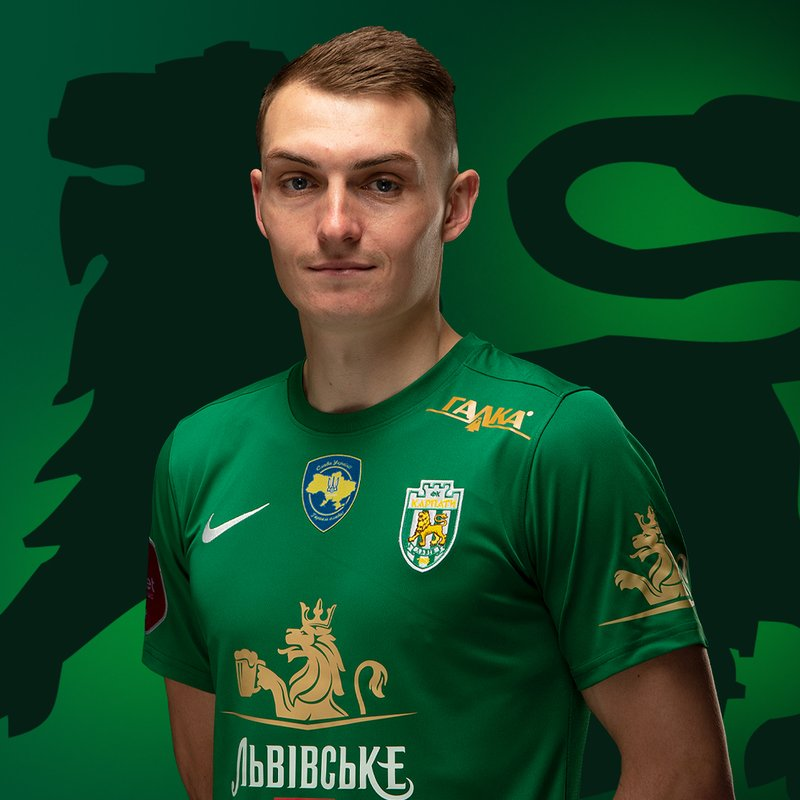

Personal information
- Full name: Denys Ihorovych Halenkov
- Date of birth: 13 October 1995 (age 31)
- Place of birth: Dnipropetrovsk, Ukraine
- Height: 1.84 m (6 ft 0 in)
- Position: Forward

Team information
- Current team: Poltava
- Number: 7

Youth career
- 2007–2012: ISTA Dnipropetrovsk
- 2012–2013: Dnipro Dnipropetrovsk

Senior career*
Years	Team	Apps	(Gls)
2013–2014	Dnipro Dnipropetrovsk	0	(0)
2014–2016	Olimpik Donetsk	3	(0)
2016–2018	Desna Chernihiv	14	(0)
2018	→ Sumy (loan)	8	(1)
2018–2021	Polissya Zhytomyr	61	(5)
2021–2024	Karpaty Lviv	38	(3)
2023–2024	→ Ahrobiznes Volochysk (loan)	22	(4)
2024–	Poltava	62	(3)
- * Club domestic league appearances and goals as of 22 November 2026

Denys Ihorovych Halenkov (Ukrainian: Денис Ігорович Галенков; born 13 October 1995) is a professional Ukrainian football striker who plays for Poltava.

== Career ==
Halenkov is a product of the ISTA Dnipropetrovsk and FC Dnipro Dnipropetrovsk youth school systems.

He made his debut for FC Olimpik in the match against FC Illichivets Mariupol on 30 May 2015 in the Ukrainian Premier League.

=== Desna Chernihiv ===
In summer 2016 he moved to Desna Chernihiv, the main club of Chernihiv in Ukrainian First League, where he played 14 games.

=== Polissya Zhytomyr ===
In 2018 he moved to Polissya Zhytomyr and with the club he got promoted to Ukrainian First League after getting second place in Ukrainian Second League, in the season 2019–20.

=== Karpaty Lviv ===
In summer 2021 he moved Karpaty Lviv in Ukrainian Second League. On 4 August 2021 he scored in the First preliminary round of Ukrainian Cup against AFSC Kyiv. On 31 August 2021 he scored in the Third preliminary round of Ukrainian Cup against Volyn Lutsk. On 5 September he made his contribue to the victory against FC Chernihiv, the second main team of the city of Chernihiv at the Ukraina Stadium in Lviv.

=== Poltava ===
On 9 August 2024, Halenkov joined Poltava in Ukrainian First League. On 9 November 2025 he scored his first goal in Ukrainian Premier League against Shakhtar Donetsk.

== Honours ==
Polissya Zhytomyr

- Ukrainian Second League: 2019–20

Desna Chernihiv

- Ukrainian First League: 2017–18
