= Vladyslav Ohirya =

Ukrainian footballer

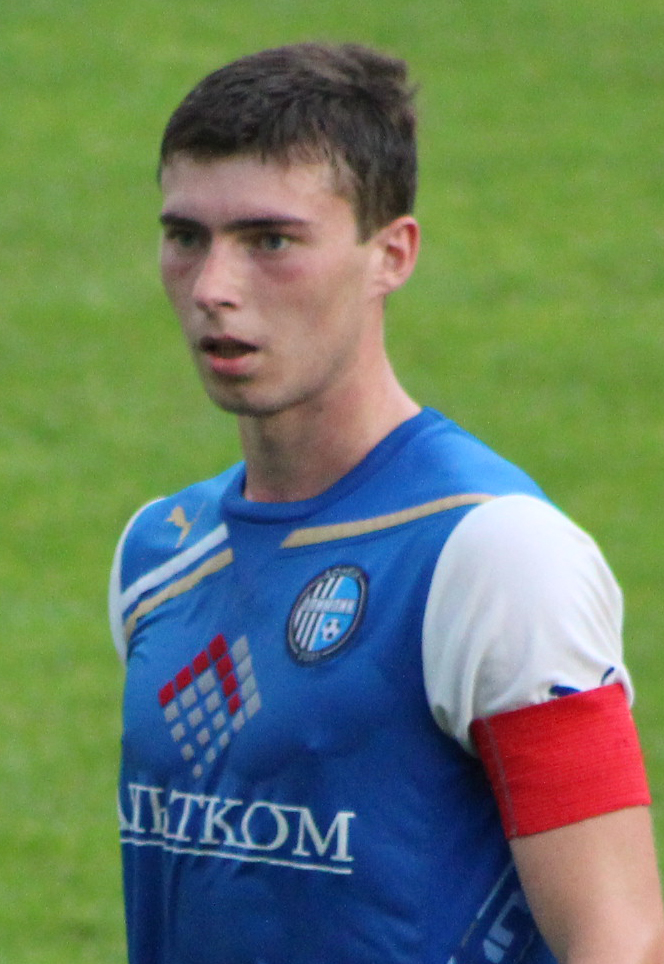

Personal information
- Full name: Vladyslav Leonidovych Ohirya
- Date of birth: 3 April 1990 (age 36)
- Place of birth: Hirske, Ukrainian SSR
- Height: 1.75 m (5 ft 9 in)
- Position: Midfielder

Youth career
- FC Shakhtar Hirske
- 2003–2007: LVUFK Luhansk

Senior career*
Years	Team	Apps	(Gls)
2007–2013	Zorya Luhansk	3	(0)
2010–2011	→ Arsenal Bila Tserkva (loan)	28	(2)
2011–2013	→ Olimpik Donetsk (loan)	63	(0)
2013–2016	Olimpik Donetsk	74	(0)
2016–2017	Oleksandriya	21	(1)
2017	Irtysh Pavlodar	11	(0)
2017–2021	Desna Chernihiv	92	(0)
2021–2024	Polissya Zhytomyr	44	(1)
2024	Chornomorets Odesa	2	(0)
2024	Dinaz Vyshhorod	11	(0)
2025	Lisne	1	(0)

International career
2008–2009	Ukraine U19	3	(0)
- * Club domestic league appearances and goals as of 2 September 2025

Vladyslav Ohirya (Ukrainian: Владислав Леонідович Огіря; born 3 April 1990) is a Ukrainian professional footballer who plays as a midfielder.

== Career ==
He is a product of the LVUFK Luhansk youth academy. He later signed with Ukrainian Premier League side FC Zorya Luhansk and went on loan to Arsenal Bila Tserkva and Olimpik Donetsk in the Ukrainian First League. He made his FC Zorya debut as a substitute against FC Karpaty Lviv on 8 August 2009.

=== Desna Chernihiv ===
In 2017, he moved to Desna Chernihiv. Two seasons later, he helped the club qualify for the 2020–21 Europa League third qualifying round.

In 2020 he became the captain of the club. He extended his contract with Desna Chernihiv for two more years following the 2020–21 season. On 24 June 2021, he left the club after four seasons.

=== Polissya Zhytomyr ===
On 26 June 2021 he signed for Polissya Zhytomyr in the Ukrainian First League. He was appointed captain for the 2022–23 season.

=== FC Lisne ===
In July 2025 he signed for Lisne just admitted in Ukrainian Second League.

== Honours ==
Polissya Zhytomyr

- Ukrainian First League: 2022–23

Desna Chernihiv

- Ukrainian First League: 2017–18

Olimpik Donetsk

- Ukrainian First League: 2013–14

== Gallery ==
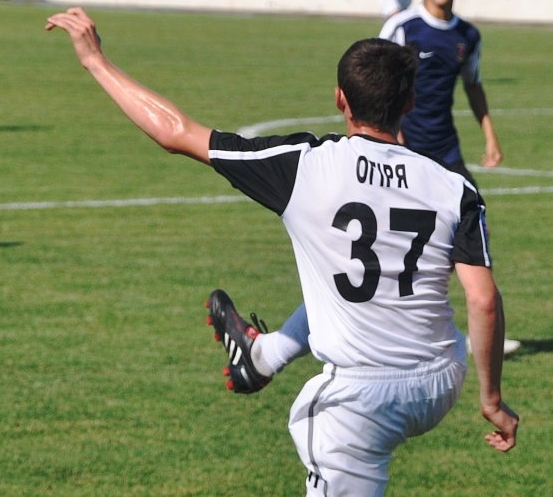
Vladyslav Ohirya with Arsenal Bila Tserkva in 2010

Preceded by Denys Favorov; 2018- 2020	Captain of Desna Chernihiv; 2020-2021	Succeeded by Yehor Kartushov
