= Andriy Yakymiv =

Ukrainian footballer

Personal information
- Full name: Andriy Andriyovych Yakymiv
- Date of birth: 15 June 1997 (age 29)
- Place of birth: Chervonohrad, Ukraine
- Height: 1.83 m (6 ft 0 in)
- Position: Midfielder

Team information
- Current team: Livyi Bereh Kyiv
- Number: 97

Youth career
- 2010–2014: UFK Lviv

Senior career*
Years	Team	Apps	(Gls)
2014–2016	Karpaty Lviv	0	(0)
2016–2018	Stal Kamianske	27	(1)
2018–2019	Desna Chernihiv	4	(0)
2019–2020	Kaposvári Rákóczi	15	(0)
2020–2021	Chornomorets Odesa	7	(0)
2021	Inhulets Petrove	0	(0)
2022	Nõmme Kalju	0	(0)
2022	Lviv	6	(0)
2023–	Livyi Bereh Kyiv	68	(6)
- * Club domestic league appearances and goals as of 3 June 2026

Andriy Andriyovych Yakymiv (Ukrainian: Андрій Андрійович Якимів; born 15 June 1997) is a Ukrainian professional footballer who plays as a midfielder for Livyi Bereh Kyiv.

== Career ==
Yakymiv is a product of the UFK Lviv youth team system playing at the Ukrainian Youth Football League. In 2014 he signed with FC Karpaty Lviv for which he played only in the Ukrainian Premier League Reserves.

Beginning in summer 2016 he played for FC Stal Kamianske, making his senior debut and scoring the winning goal against FC Zorya Luhansk on 16 July 2017 in the Ukrainian Premier League.
