= Mykhaylo Serhiychuk =

Ukrainian footballer

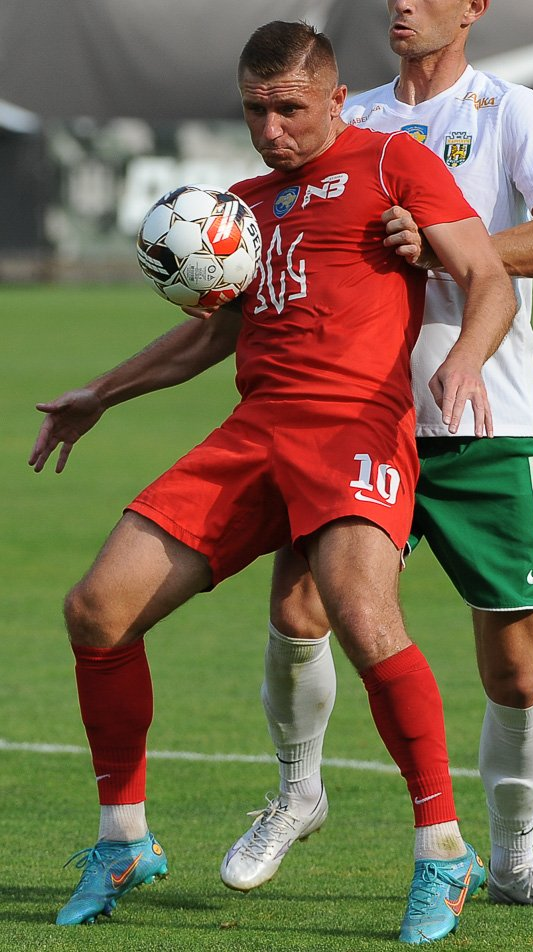
- Mykhaylo Serhiychuk with Nyva Buzova in 2023

Personal information
- Full name: Mykhaylo Mykolayovych Serhiychuk
- Date of birth: 29 July 1991 (age 35)
- Place of birth: Kostiantynivka, Rivne Oblast, Soviet Union (now Ukraine)
- Height: 1.78 m (5 ft 10 in)
- Position: Forward

Team information
- Current team: Trostianets
- Number: 13

Youth career
- 2005–2008: KOLIPS-Shturm Kostopil

Senior career*
Years	Team	Apps	(Gls)
2008–2010	Veres Rivne	35	(3)
2009	→ Nyva Vinnytsia (loan)	9	(0)
2011–2013	Slavutych Cherkasy	57	(17)
2013–2014	Mykolaiv	20	(10)
2014–2016	Karpaty Lviv	21	(1)
2015–2016	→ Hoverla Uzhhorod (loan)	17	(2)
2016	Veres Rivne	17	(4)
2017	Olimpik Donetsk	9	(2)
2017–2018	Veres Rivne	20	(6)
2018	Vorskla Poltava	20	(3)
2019	Desna Chernihiv	11	(2)
2019	Ventspils	9	(1)
2020–2022	Veres Rivne	52	(9)
2023	Bukovyna Chernivtsi	8	(4)
2023	Nyva Buzova	17	(2)
2024	Dinaz Vyshhorod	8	(0)
2024–	Trostianets	14	(3)
- * Club domestic league appearances and goals as of 24 April 2024

Mykhaylo Mykolayovych Serhiychuk (Ukrainian: Михайло Миколайович Сергійчук; born 29 July 1991) is a Ukrainian professional footballer who plays as a striker for Trostianets.

== Career ==
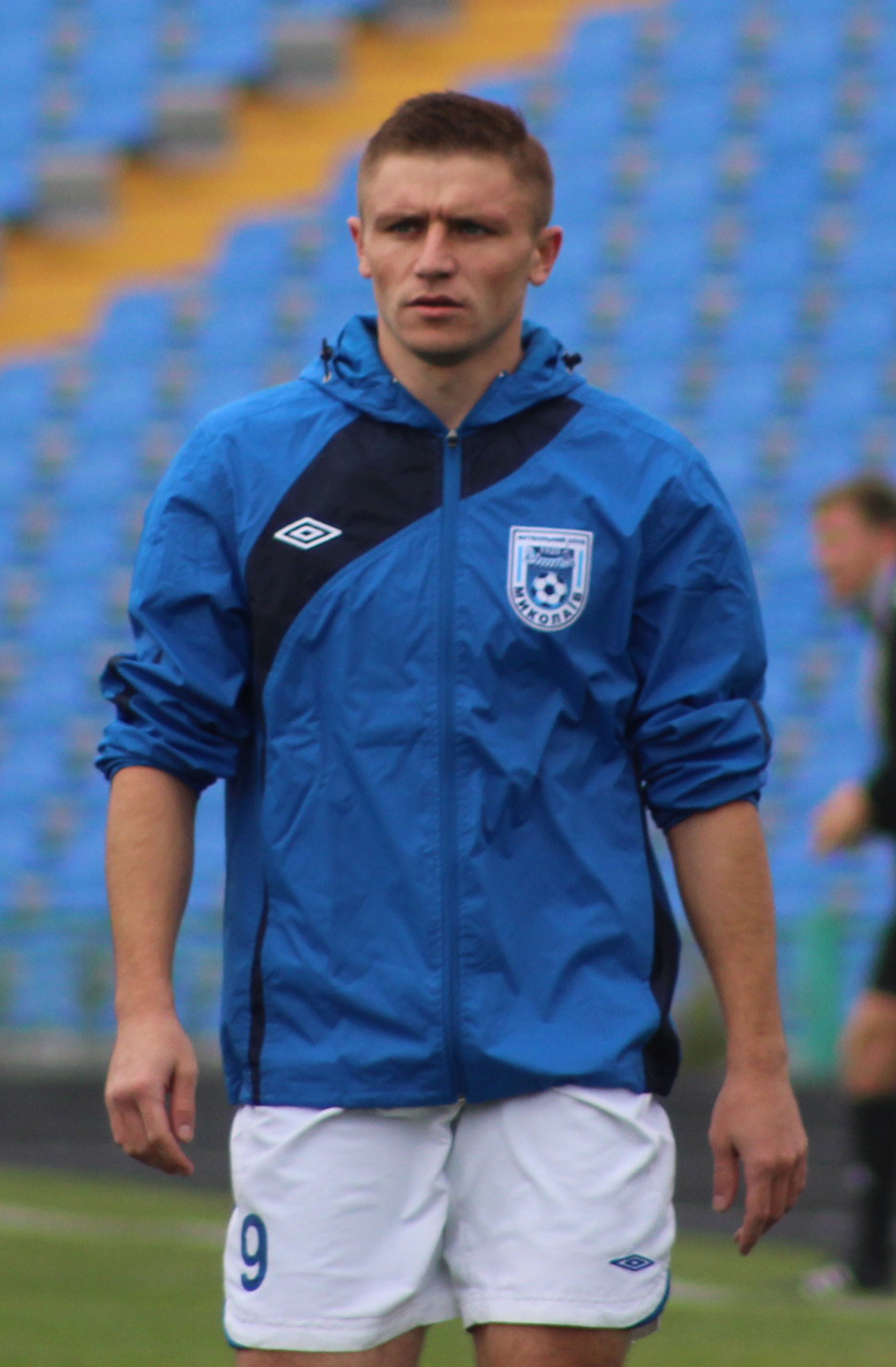
Playing for Mykolaiv in 2013

=== Early years ===
He is a product of KOLIPS-Shturm Kostopil sportive school.

=== Mykolaiv ===
Serhiychuk spent time with different Ukrainian teams that played in the Ukrainian Second League and was promoted to the Ukrainian First League as player of his new club Mykolaiv in 2013.

=== Desna Chernihiv ===
In January 2019 he moved from Vorskla Poltava to Desna Chernihiv.

=== Ventspils ===
In the summer of 2019 he moved to Ventspils.

=== Veres Rivne ===
On 29 August 2021 he scored against Desna Chernihiv in the Ukrainian Premier League at the Chernihiv Stadium. He was chosen player of the round 6 of the 2021–22 Ukrainian Premier League. On 1 December 2022 his contract with the club was terminated.

=== Bukovyna Chernivtsi ===
In March 2023 he signed for Bukovyna Chernivtsi. On 14 April 2023 he scored against Chernihiv in Ukrainian First League.

== Honours ==
=== Club ===
Veres Rivne

- Ukrainian First League: (2) 2020–21, 2016–17

Nyva Vinnytsia

- Ukrainian Second League: 2009–10

=== Individual ===
- Ukrainian Premier League Player of the Round: Round 6
