= Andriy Slinkin =

Ukrainian footballer

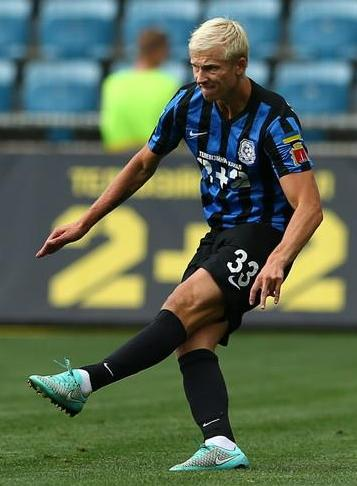

Personal information
- Full name: Andriy Viktorovych Slinkin
- Date of birth: 19 February 1991 (age 35)
- Place of birth: Odesa, Ukrainian SSR, Soviet Union
- Height: 1.78 m (5 ft 10 in)
- Position: Left back

Youth career
- 2005: FC Ukrposhta Odesa
- 2006–2007: FC Yunha-Chorne More Odesa
- 2007–2008: Chornomorets Odesa

Senior career*
Years	Team	Apps	(Gls)
2008–2016	Chornomorets Odesa	30	(0)
2010–2011	→ Chornomorets-2 Odesa	16	(6)
2012	→ Sumy (loan)	12	(0)
2014	→ Senica (loan)	12	(0)
2016	→ Zaria Bălți (loan)	10	(2)
2016	Dacia Chișinău	12	(1)
2017	Zaria Bălți	21	(0)
2018–2019	Desna Chernihiv	18	(1)
2019	Mykolaiv	8	(0)
2020	Chornomorets Odesa	14	(0)
2021	Ventspils	4	(0)
2021	Peremoha Dnipro	2	(0)
2021–2022	Nyva Vinnytsia	11	(0)
2022	Shevardeni-1906 Tbilisi	7	(0)
2022	Jonava	8	(0)
- * Club domestic league appearances and goals as of 18 March 2023

Andriy Slinkin (Ukrainian: Андрій Вікторович Слінкін; born 19 February 1991) is a Ukrainian footballer who plays as a left back.

== Career ==
In 2022 he moved to FK Jonava

== Honours ==
Chornomorets Odesa

- Ukrainian Cup Runner-up: 2012–13
- Ukrainian Super Cup Runner-up: 2013
