= List of FC Desna Chernihiv records and statistics =

FC Desna Chernihiv (Ukrainian: ФК «Десна» Чернігів) is a Ukrainian football club based in Chernihiv. The original name of the club was "Avanhard" (FC Avanhard Chernihiv) during its first year of existence as part of a republican Avanhard sports society. Between 1961 and 1970 the club was called Desna. In 1972 it was replaced with SC Chernihiv (team of the SKA Kyiv) that played in Chernihiv for the next couple of years. In 1977 Desna was revived now in place of the amateur club "Khimik Chernihiv" that won regional competitions.

== Players in national teams ==
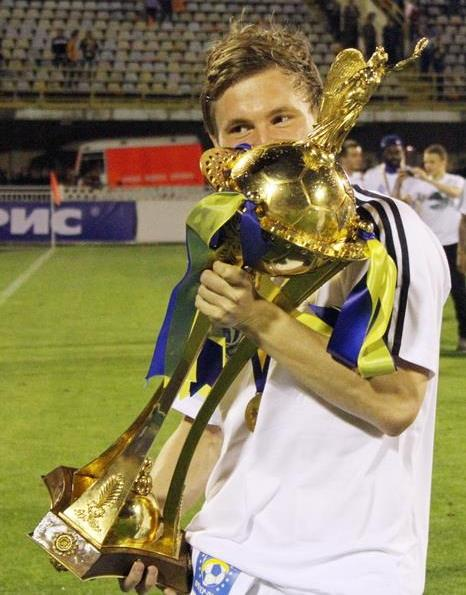
Vladyslav Kalitvintsev, the first player belonging to Desna Chernihiv to be called in the Ukraine national football team.

In September 2021, Vladyslav Kalitvintsev became the first player belonging to Desna to be called in the Ukraine national football team against Finland. For the same match has been included also Serhiy Bolbat who played in Desna on loan from Shakhtar Donetsk. There are other players who took part in the national team before and after playing in the club like Pylyp Budkivskyi, Yevhen Selin, Andriy Totovytskyi, Denys Bezborodko and Vladislav Nosenko. The first player to be called Ukraine national football team was Yukhym Konoplya in 2020 but the player was on loan to the club by Shakhtar Donetsk There are other players who took part in the national team before and after playing in the club like Pylyp Budkivskyi, Yevhen Selin, Andriy Totovytskyi, Denys Bezborodko. Regarding other country, Desna had the Estonian international experience Joonas Tamm and the Constantin Dima who served only the under 21 team. The club had also Andriy Biba that he played one match for Soviet Union national football team, Oleh Kuznetsov, thatafter left the club got into the final of the European Football Championship in 1988 and Viktor Bannikov that he also got into the final of the European Football Championship in 1972.

=== Ukraine ===
Ukraine national football team
Rank	Player	Year of Debut	Total Caps	Total Goals
1	(Ukraine) Vladyslav Kalitvintsev	2021	0	0
2	(Ukraine) Serhiy Bolbat (Loan from Shakhtar Donetsk)	2014-2019	5	0
3	(Ukraine) Yukhym Konoplya (Loan from Shakhtar Donetsk)	2020-	20	2
Ukraine under-21
1	(Ukraine) Illya Shevtsov	2020-2021	4	1
2	(Ukraine) Serhiy Bolbat (Loan from Shakhtar Donetsk)	2013–2014	13	2
3	(Ukraine) Vikentiy Voloshyn (on loan from Dynamo Kyiv)	2021-2022	0	0
4	(Ukraine) Dmytro Zaderetskyi	2015	4	1
5	(Ukraine) Mykhailo Mudryk (Loan from Shakhtar Donetsk)	2019-	9	2
6	(Ukraine) Yukhym Konoplya (Loan from Shakhtar Donetsk)	2019–2020	7	1
Ukraine under-20
1	(Ukraine) Oleksandr Safronov	2018–2019	7	0
2	(Ukraine) Yukhym Konoplya (Loan from Shakhtar Donetsk)	2019	8	0
Ukraine under-19
1	(Ukraine) Oleksandr Safronov	2017–2018	7	2
2	(Ukraine) Vikentiy Voloshyn (on loan from Dynamo Kyiv)	2018–2019	4	2
3	(Ukraine) Yukhym Konoplya (Loan from Shakhtar Donetsk)	2018	4	0
Ukraine under-18
1	(Ukraine) Oleksandr Safronov	2016–2017	4	0
2	(Ukraine) Vikentiy Voloshyn (on loan from Dynamo Kyiv)	2018	2	0
3	(Ukraine) Yukhym Konoplya (Loan from Shakhtar Donetsk)	2016	8	0
Ukraine under-17
1	(Ukraine) Illya Shevtsov	2016-2017	7	1
2	(Ukraine) Vikentiy Voloshyn (on loan from Dynamo Kyiv)	2017-2018	14	5
3	(Ukraine) Mykhailo Mudryk (Loan from Shakhtar Donetsk)	2017–2018	5	3
4	(Ukraine) Yukhym Konoplya(Loan from Shakhtar Donetsk)	2014–2015	7	0
Ukraine under-16
1	(Ukraine) Yevheniy Belych	2016-2017	4	0

The lists of players who took part in the national team during their time at the club. In bold the player currently playing for the club.

=== Estonia ===
Rank	Player	Year of Debut	Total Caps	Total Goals
1	(Estonia) Joonas Tamm	2011-	64	4

The lists of players who took part in the national team during their time at the club.

=== Romania ===
Rank	Player	Year of Debut	Total Caps	Total Goals
1	(Romania) Constantin Dima	2015	8	0

The lists of players who took part in the national team during their time at the club.

== Player records and statistics ==
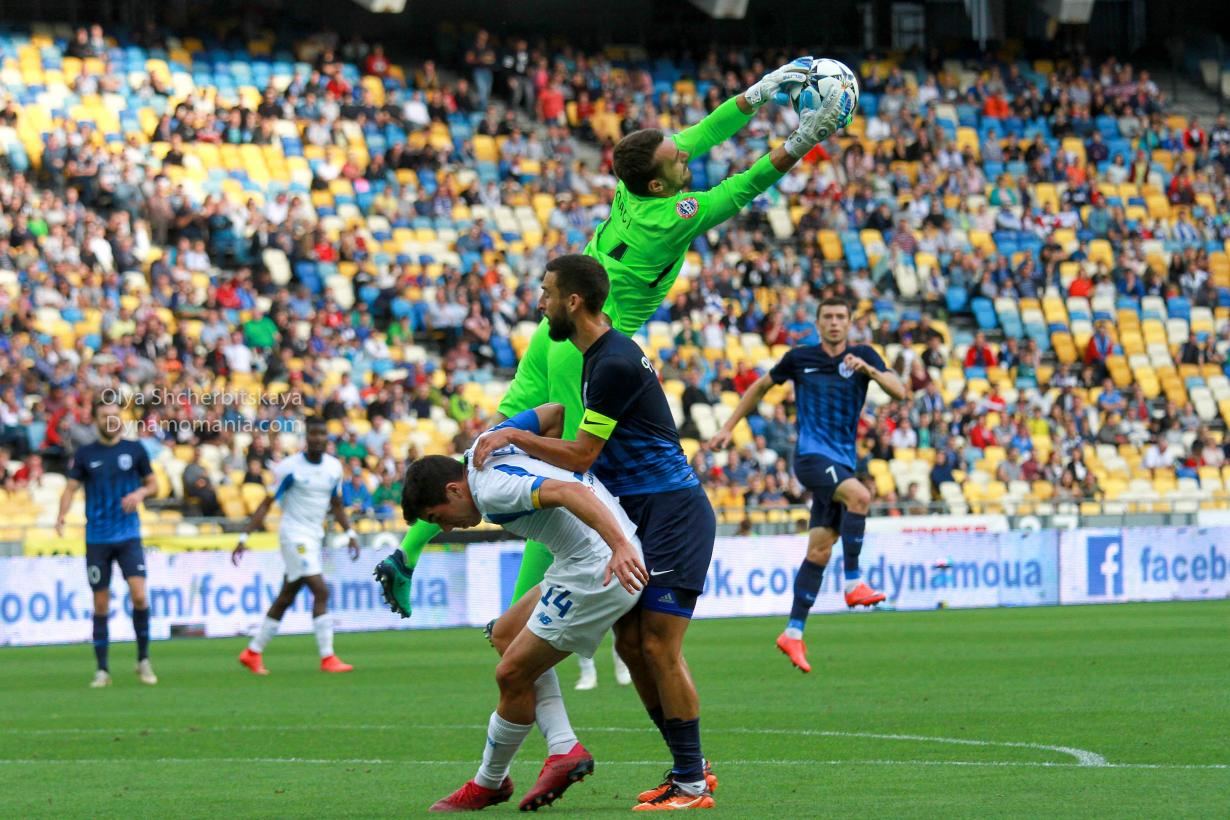
Yevhen Past - The Goalkeeper with most clean sheets in Ukrainian Premier League with Desna Chernihiv in the season 2019–20

=== Appearances ===
- Most player appearances in all competitions: (Ukraine) Serhiy Sapronov, 474 matches
- Most foreign player appearances in all competitions: (Georgia (country)) Kakhaberi Sartania, 136 matches

=== Goalkeepers ===
- Most clean sheets in Ukrainian Premier League: (Ukraine) Yevhen Past, 11 matches in the season 2019–20 (with Andriy Pyatov)
- Most appearances in all competitions: (Ukraine) Yuriy Ovcharov, 198 matches
- Most appearances in UEFA Europa League: (Ukraine) Yevhen Past, 1 match
- Most appearances as foreigner goalkeeper: (Georgia (country)) Nikoloz Kheladze, 2 matches
- Most appearances goalkeeper with dual citizenship: (Ukraine) (Russia) Dmytro Tyapushkin, 116 matches

=== Goalscorers ===
- Most goals in all competitions: (Ukraine) Oleksandr Kozhemyachenko, 128 goals
- Most goals by season in Ukrainian Premier League: (Ukraine) Oleksandr Filippov Season 2019–20 (16 goals)

=== Top goalscorers ===
- Top Scorer Ukrainian Second League: (Ukraine) Oleksandr Kozhemyachenko season 2010–11 (12 goals)
- Top Scorer Ukrainian Second League: (Ukraine) Oleksandr Kozhemyachenko season 2004–05 (20 goals)
- Top Scorer Ukrainian Second League: (Ukraine) Oleksandr Kozhemyachenko season 2005–06 (21 goals)

=== Most Valuable Players ===
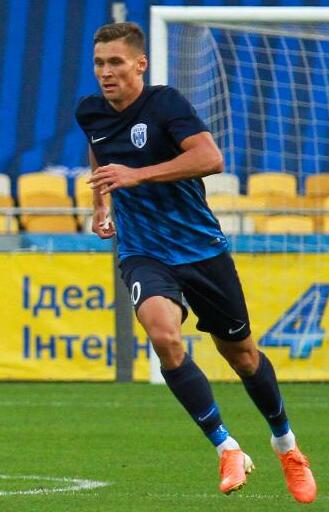
Oleksandr Filippov - Most Valuable Player sold by the club

Departure:
Rank	Name	Price
**1**	(Ukraine) Oleksandr Filippov	€1.500.000
**2**	(Ukraine) Vladyslav Kalitvintsev	€500.000
**3**	(Ukraine) Oleksiy Hutsulyak	€500.000
**4**	(Ukraine) Artem Favorov	€470.000
**5**	(Ukraine) Andriy Yarmolenko	€250.000

Arrivals:
Rank	Name	Price
**1**	(Ukraine) Oleksiy Hutsulyak	€300.000
**2**	(Ukraine) Artem Sukhotskyi	€250.000
**3**	(Romania) Constantin Dima	€100.000
**4**	(Georgia (country)) Luka Koberidze	€25.000

=== Full appearances ===
This List of Desna Chernihiv records and statistics. In bold the players who are corrently playing with Desna.

#	Position	Name	Career	Caps	Goals
1	DF	(Ukraine) Serhiy Sapronov	1979–1984 & 1987–1992 & 1996–2000	474	7
2	FW	(Soviet Union) Hennadiy Horshkov	1977–1979 & 1980–1987	385	112
3	DF	(Soviet Union) Valeriy Kravchinsky	1960–1970	383	3
4	FW	(Soviet Union) Andriy Protsko	1966–1970 & 1977–1980	318	57
5	FW	(Ukraine) Volodymyr Avramenko	1991–2004	314	59
6	FW	(Ukraine) Oleksandr Kozhemyachenko	1998-2002 & 2002-2012	310	128
7	FW	(Soviet Union) Valentyn Buhlak	1981–1992	277	14
7	DF	(Ukraine) Yuriy Nadtochiy	1985-1997	277	5
8	FW	(Ukraine) Oleksandr Savenchuk	1992-1994 & 1994-1999 & 1994-1999 & 2003-2005	275	31
9	DF, MF, FW	(Ukraine) Viktor Rudoy	1980-1999	269	27
10	FW	(Ukraine) Ihor Bobovych	1993-2007	267	50
10	MF	(Ukraine) Yehor Kartushov	2012-2022	244	33
11	MF	(Ukraine) Igor Chetverik	1987-1994	241	56
11	DF	(Ukraine) Victor Lazarenko	1977-1980 & 1990-1992	237	3
11	DF	(Ukraine) Pavlo Schedrakov	2005–2009 & 2013–2018	237	7
12	MF	(Ukraine) Andrey Krivenok	1985 & 1990–1997	236	19
12	DF	(Ukraine) Vladimir Drobot	1991–1994 & 1994–1999	222	12
12	DF	(Soviet Union) Viktor Danilevsky	1978-1984	224	6
12	FW	(Ukraine) Yuriy Yakovenko	1990-1993 & 1999-2002 & 20032004	204	54
12	DF	(Ukraine) Yuriy Bondarenko	1988–1994 & 2000–2001 & 2001–2002	203	8
13	DF	(Ukraine) Volodymyr Chulanov	2005-2010 & 2011-2016	203	4
13	GK	(Ukraine) Yuriy Ovcharov	1984-1988 & 1991-1993 & 1997-1999 & 2001-2003	198	0
13	GK	(Ukraine) Yuriy Melashenko	1987-1994 & 1994-1995 & 1999-2002	194	0
14	DF	(Ukraine) Vadym Postovoy	1987-1994 & 1999-2002	190	21
15	DF	(Ukraine) Vladimir Kulik	1993-1998 & 1998–1999 & 2000-2001 & 2001-2002	178	7
16	DF	(Soviet Union) Mykola Lytvyn	1981 & 1986–1989	175	27
17	MF	(Ukraine) Vadym Melnyk	2012–2018	173	13
19	DF	(Soviet Union) Mikhail Chabaida	1968-1970 & 1977-1978	171	2
18	FW	(Ukraine) Peter Pilipeyko	1994–1987 & 1998–2000	169	40
18	FW	(Ukraine) Yuriy Ovcharenko	1990–1993 & 1993–1994 & 1996–1999	157	37
18	DF	(Ukraine) Konstantin Poznyak	1998-2005	144	1
18	MF, FW	(Ukraine) Valentyn Krukovets	2003-2007	143	51
19	MF	(Ukraine) Vadym Bovtruk	2011–2017	142	9
20	MF	(Ukraine) Andriy Mostovyi	2016–2021	141	2
23	MF	(Ukraine) Yevhen Chepurnenko	2012–2014 & 2015-2017 & 2021	141	39
21	MF	(Ukraine) Denys Favorov	2016-2020	139	39
22	FW	(Ukraine) Oleksandr Filippov	2016-2020	138	48
24	MF	(Georgia (country)) Kakhaberi Sartania	1993–1994 & 1994–2000	136	2
24	DF	(Ukraine) Petro Kondratyuk	2008–2009 & 2012–2016	133	27
24	MF	(Ukraine) Oleh Ivashchenko	1985 & 1987 & 1994–1997 & 1999–2000	131	4
24	MF	(Ukraine) Sergey Alayev	1999–2004 & 2004–2007 & 2010–2011	130	24
25	GK	(Soviet Union) Dmytro Tyapushkin	1988–1990	116	0
25	GK	(Soviet Union) Yuriy Hruznov	1966–1970	116	0
26	DF	(Ukraine) Igor Pakhar	1992–1995	115	0
27	MF	(Soviet Union) Anatoliy Matyukhin	1961-1964	111	0
26	MF	(Ukraine) Serhiy Starenkyi	2008–2010 & 2018–2021	108	14
27	DF	(Ukraine) Vadym Zhuk	2012–2015 & 2017 & 2021-2022	103	1
27	DF	(Ukraine) Volodymyr Kolomiets	1995–1999	103	3
27	DF	(Ukraine) Artem Perevozchikov	1999–2002 & 2003–2006	103	7
28	FW	(Soviet Union) Yukhym Shkolnykov	1963–1968	94	44
28	MF / FW	(Ukraine) Maksym Borovkov	2007–2010 & 2011–2012	94	1
29	MF	(Ukraine) Vladyslav Ohirya	2017-2021	92	0
35	DF	(Ukraine) Andriy Hitchenko	2010 & 2018-2021	91	8
30	DF / MF	(Soviet Union) Volodymyr Prychynenko	1986–1988	87	0
31	DF	(Soviet Union) Oleh Kuznetsov	1981–1982	86	0
32	DF	(Ukraine) Yarema Kavatsiv	2012–2015	85	8
33	MF	(Georgia (country)) Levan Arveladze	2016–2018 & 2019-2022	85	11
34	MF	(Ukraine) Dmytro Kolodin	2005–2007	83	24
34	GK	(Soviet Union) Serhiy Umen	1979-1984 & 1987	83	0
37	MF	(Ukraine) Yaroslav Serdyuk	2006-2012 & 2014-2015	82	2
37	GK	(Ukraine) Andriy Fedorenko	2008–2009 & 2012–2014	81	0
48	MF	(Ukraine) Serhiy Zelinsky	1989-1991 & 1994-1997	80	9
48	MF	(Ukraine) Oleksandr Volkov	2016-2019 & 2020-2021	80	12
48	FW	(Soviet Union) Volodymyr Zhylin	1986-1987	80	19
48	FW	(Ukraine) Denys Bezborodko	2017–2019 & 2021-2022	77	21
48	DF	(Ukraine) Denys Anelikov	2003–2004 & 2009–2013	76	1
41	DF	(Ukraine) Tymur Rustamov	2005-2008 & 2009-2010 & 2011-2013	75	4
42	MF	(Ukraine) Vitaliy Havrysh	2003–2006	74	17
43	GK	(Ukraine) Yevhen Past	2018–2021	72	0
44	MF	(Georgia (country)) Luka Koberidze	2016–2018	69	1
45	FW	(Ukraine) Yuriy Furta	2012–2014	67	14
48	DF	(Ukraine) Yaroslav Zaiats	1996–1999	66	5
48	MF	(Ukraine) Ruslan Hilazyev	1996–1998	66	5
48	MF	(Ukraine) Vladyslav Kalitvintsev	2019–2021	63	10
49	DF	(Ukraine) Maksym Imerekov	2018–	62	4
48	MF	(Ukraine) Yevhen Yeliseyev	2009–2010 & 2015	61	4
49	GK	(Ukraine) Viktor Litvin	1998–2001 & 2005–2008 & 2010–2011	60	0
49	GK	(Ukraine) Kostyantyn Makhnovskyi	2016–2019	60	0
49	MF	(Ukraine) Maksym Banasevych	2016 & 2017–2019	60	5
51	MF	(Ukraine) Volodymyr Holovaty	1997–1999	57	13
51	MF	(Ukraine) Serhiy Kucherenko	2007–2009	57	13
52	MF	(Ukraine) Artem Favorov	2018–2019	56	14
53	MF	(Ukraine) Andriy Dombrovskyi	2019-2022	53	0
53	MF	(Ukraine) Anton Bratkov	2016-2017 & 2018	53	8
53	FW	(Ukraine) Eldar Allakhverdiyev	2001–2003	52	7
53	DF	(Ukraine) Bohdan Husak	1997-1999	52	2
54	GK	(Soviet Union) Viktor Bannikov	1959–1961	51	0
54	DF	(Ukraine) Oleksandr Chornomorets	2016–2017	51	0
52	FW	(Georgia (country)) Gocha Gogokhia	1993-1993 & 1994-1995 & 1998-1999	48	9
53	FW	(Ukraine) Pylyp Budkivskyi	2020-2021	47	10
53	MF	(Ukraine) Dmytro Khlyobas	2018-2020	47	11
53	DF	(Ukraine) Rudolf Sukhomlynov	2014–2017	47	0
53	DF	(Ukraine) Andrey Belousov	1991–1994	47	1
55	DF	(Ukraine) Ruslan Ermolenkov	2006-2008 & 2009-2010	46	6
56	FW	(Ukraine) Maksym Dehtyarov	2019 & 2020-2022	44	8
56	MF	(Ukraine) Vitaliy Yermakov	2018-2019 & 2020-2021	44	2
56	DF	(Ukraine) Yukhym Konoplya	2019-2021	44	1
53	MF	(Ukraine) Andriy Totovytskyi	2020-2021	43	16
57	DF	(Ukraine) Dmytro Romanenko	1997—1998 & 2004	42	4
57	DF	(Ukraine) Andriy Smalko	2013—2016	42	0
57	MF	(Ukraine) Mykhaylo Kozak	2013–2015 & 2019	42	4
61	DF	(Ukraine) Maksym Stoyan	2008-2010	38	0
61	DF	(Ukraine) Oleksandr Stetsenko	2012–2014	38	12
61	GK	(Ukraine) Ihor Lytovka	2018-2022	37	0
61	FW	(Ukraine) Serhiy Hrybanov	2009–2010 & 2012	37	16
61	MF	(Ukraine) Maksym Maksymenko	2016–2017	37	2
62	MF	(Ukraine) Roman Lutsenko	2011–2013	36	3
62	DF / MF	(Ukraine) Ivan Bohatyr	2005–2006	36	0
64	GK	(Ukraine) Serhiy Sitalo	2014–2016	35	0
64	GK	(Ukraine) Yuriy Nikitenko	2007–2008	35	0
64	FW	(Ukraine) Mykola Ahapov	2013–2014	35	3
64	FW	(Ukraine) Roman Machulenko	2013–2014	35	1
64	MF	(Ukraine) Denys Skepskyi	2003 & 2011 & 2015 & 2017	35	6
67	DF	(Estonia) Joonas Tamm	2020-2021	33	2
67	MF	(Soviet Union) Serhiy Prychynenko	1979–1980	33	1
67	MF	(Ukraine) Oleksandr Kormich	1994–1995 & 1995–1997	33	2
67	MF / FW	(Ukraine) Oleksandr Hrebieniuk	2008–2009 & 2011	33	4
70	FW	(Ukraine) Oleksandr Derebchynskyi	2013-2015	32	6
71	MF	(Guinea) Mamadi Sangare	2007–2009	31	1
71	MF	(Ukraine) Vadym Voronchenko	2012–2015	31	1
71	MF	(Ukraine) Oleksiy Hutsulyak	2020-2021	30	2
71	FW	(Ukraine) Dmytro Brovkin	2012–2014	30	4
73	MF	(Soviet Union) Yevhen Maslennikov	1960	29	5
73	MF	(Soviet Union) Serhiy Morozov	1970	28	0
73	DF / MF	(Ukraine) Serhiy Datsenko	1995-1996	28	6
73	MF	(Ukraine) Ruslan Kisil	2014–2015 & 2018	28	3
76	FW	(Ukraine) Ihor Kirienko	2017–2019	27	2
76	FW	(Soviet Union) Valeriy Kinashenko	1989	27	3
76	DF	(Ukraine) Artem Akhrameyev	2003–2004	27	3
77	FW	(Ukraine) Artem Mostovyi	2008-2010	26	4
77	FW	(Ukraine) Vadym Antipov	2006–2007	26	1
80	FW	(Ukraine) Volodymyr Postolatyev	2007–2008	25	10
80	DF	(Serbia) Milan Zagorac	2003–2004	25	0
84	DF	(Ukraine) Oleksandr Romanchuk	2003–2004	24	0
84	DF	(Ukraine) Leonid Haidarzhy	1997–1998	24	1
84	MF	(Ukraine) Andriy Bohdanov	2019	24	1
85	DF	(Georgia (country)) Anzor Kavteladze	1993–1994 & 1994–1995	23	1
85	DF	(Ukraine) Temur Partsvania	2017 & 2019	23	1
85	DF	(Ukraine) Volodymyr Polishchuk	2005–2007	23	0
86	DF	(Azerbaijan) Vladislav Nosenko	2002–2004	22	0
86	GK	(Ukraine) Oleh Shevchenko	2013–2017	22	0
87	DF	(Ukraine) Mykola Zuyenko	2002–2003	21	0
87	MF	(Ukraine) Illya Kovalenko	2017–2018	21	3
87	FW	(Georgia (country)) Levan Gulordava	2010–2011 & 2013–2014	21	4
88	DF	(Ukraine) Dmytro Zaderetskyi	2015–2016	20	1
88	MF	(Ukraine) Orest Kuzyk	2015–2016	20	1
88	DF	(Ukraine) Oleh Kerchu	2006	20	0
89	FW	(Ukraine) Illya Shevtsov	2020-2022	19	1
89	MF	(Ukraine) Oleksandr Oliynyk	2010–2011	19	3
89	MF	(Ukraine) Ruslan Chernenko	2012-2013	19	3
89	DF	(Ukraine) Ivan Bilyi	2013	19	1
90	MF	(Ukraine) Taras Zaviyskyi	2021-	18	3
90	MF	(Ukraine) Andriy Slinkin	2018–2019	18	1
90	FW	(Ukraine) Roman Poltavets	2011–2012	18	1
90	FW	(Ukraine) Yuriy Pleshakov	2013–2014	18	5
90	MF	(Ukraine) Anton Kramar	2014-2015	18	2
90	GK	(Ukraine) Yevhen Shyryayev	2011–2012	18	0
90	DF	(Ukraine) Oleksandr Safronov	2021-2022	16	0
90	DF	(Ukraine) Oleksandr Malevanov	2001-2002	16	0
90	MF	(Ukraine) Sergey Shurkhal	1999–2000 & 2002–2003	16	0
91	MF	(Ukraine) Yevhen Selin	2021-2022	15	0
91	DF	(Ukraine) Yevhen Tsymbalyuk	2021-2022	15	0
91	DF	(Ukraine) Ihor Zelenyuk	1998-1999	15	0
91	MF	(Ukraine) Anatoliy Verteletsky	2006-2007	15	0
91	DF	(Ukraine) Oleh Ratiy	2006	15	3
91	DF	(Ukraine) Oleksandr Holovko	2016-2018	15	1
91	FW	(Ukraine) Aderinsola Habib Eseola	2015	15	5
93	FW	(Ukraine) Denys Halenkov	2016-2018	14	0
93	DF	(Ukraine) Valeriy Chornyi	2007-2008	14	0
94	MF	(Ukraine) Serhiy Bolbat	2021	12	0
94	DF	(Ukraine) Serhiy Cherniy	2006-2007	13	0
94	MF	(Ukraine) Valeriy Sokolenko	2007	13	0
94	MF	(Ukraine) Yevheniy Pichkur	2008-2009	13	2
94	MF	(Ukraine) Ruslan Zeynalov	2009	13	6
94	DF / FW	(Kazakhstan) Vladimir Martynov	1997 & 1999	13	3
94	MF	(Ukraine) Yuriy Komyahin	2008	13	1
94	DF	(Ukraine) Serhiy Lyulka	2018–2019	13	0
94	DF	(Georgia (country)) Vitaly Navrozashvili	2001–2002	12	0
94	DF	(Ukraine) Serhiy Burkovsky	2002–2005	12	0
94	DF	(Ukraine) Maksym Stankevych	2002–2005	12	0
94	DF	(Ukraine) Vyacheslav Sharpar	2009	12	2
94	DF	(Ukraine) Dmytro Lelyuk	2002–2003	12	1
96	MF	(Ukraine) Vikentiy Voloshyn	2021-2022	11	1
96	MF	(Ukraine) Bohdan Myshenko	2016–2017	11	0
96	MF	(Ukraine) Oleh Leshchynskyi	1983—1984	11	1
96	FW	(Ukraine) Volodymyr Lysenko	2017	11	4
96	FW	(Ukraine) Oleh Hrytsai	2003	11	0
96	FW	(Ukraine) Mykhaylo Serhiychuk	2019	11	2
96	FW	(Ukraine) Artem Mostovyi	2019	11	2
97	DF	(Ukraine) Pavlo Polehenko	2020-2021	10	0
97	DF	(Ukraine) Artem Sukhotskyi	2021	10	0
97	DF	(Ukraine) Oleksandr Polunytskiy	2006-2007	10	0
97	MF	(Ukraine) Mykhailo Mudryk	2020	10	0
97	MF	(Ukraine) Roman Voynarovskyi	2009–2010	10	2
97	FW	(Ukraine) Kostiantyn Trukhanov	2002	10	0
97	MF	(Ukraine) Yevhen Chumak	2018		
97	GK	(Ukraine) Artem Beloshapka	2011-2013	10	0
98	DF	(Ukraine) Artur Zapadnya	2018-2021	9	0
98	MF	(Ukraine) Ihor Myhalatiuk	2006-2007	9	1
98	DF	(Ukraine) Oleh Syzon	2003-2004	9	0
98	MF	(Ukraine) Andriy Yarmolenko	2006–2007	9	4
98	MF	(Ukraine) Oleh Mazurenko	2008	9	2
98	GK	(Ukraine) Ihor Vitiv	2008	9	0
98	MF	(Ukraine) Maksym Havrylenko	2012	9	1
98	MF	(Ukraine) Yuriy Fedosenko	2008	9	0
98	MF	(Ukraine) Mykhailo Bulkin	2010–2011	9	0
98	MF	(Ukraine) Ihor Pokarynin	2007-2008	9	0
98	FW	(Ukraine) Oleksandr Ivashchenko	2015	9	0
98	FW	(Soviet Union) Ivan Kamyshev	1960	9	1
99	MF	(Ukraine) Kostyantyn Kravchenko	2015	8	0
99	FW	(Ukraine) Volodymyr Vanin	2000-2001	8	1
100	DF	(Ukraine) Oleksandr Alekseenko	2021	7	0
100	MF	(Ukraine) Vladlen Yurchenko	2021	7	1
100	GK	(Ukraine) Maksym Kuchynskyi	2011	7	0
100	FW	(Ukraine) Oleksandr Kovpak	2018	7	0
100	MF	(Georgia (country)) Giorgi Gadrani	2018	7	0
100	GK	(Ukraine) Bohdan Kohut	2016	7	0
100	GK	(Ukraine) Ihor Krapyvkin	1998–1999	7	0
100	DF	(Ukraine) Vadym Hetman	2012	7	0
100	DF	(Ukraine) Ihor Soldat	2016–2017	7	0
100	MF	(Ukraine) Oleh Fedoruk	2001–2002	7	0
100	FW	(Ukraine) Denis Shevchuk	2011	7	1
103	MF	(Ukraine) Oleksandr Masalov	2021-2022	6	0
103	DF	(Soviet Union) Oleksandr Ryabokon	1982	6	0
103	MF	(Ukraine) Volodymyr Hapon	2008	6	0
103	GK	(Ukraine) Serhii Melashenko	2016-2019	6	0
103	FW	(Ukraine) Volodymyr Kilikevych	2009	6	1
103	MF	(Ukraine) Yakiv Kripak	2009	6	1
103	MF	(Ukraine) Denys Oliynyk	2017	6	0
103	MF	(Ukraine) Anatoliy Burlin	2014	6	0
103	MF	(Ukraine) Ihor Tymchenko	2015	6	0
103	MF	(Ukraine) Mykyta Vovchenko	2015-2016	6	0
104	GK	(Ukraine) Roman Mysak	2021-2022	5	0
104	DF	(Ukraine) Kyrylo Sydorenko	2018	5	0
104	DF	(Ukraine) Dmytro Nyemchaninov	2019	5	0
104	DF	(Ukraine) Oleh Leonidov	2014–2015	5	0
104	DF	(Ukraine) Oleksiy Kovtun	2021	4	0
104	DF	(Ukraine) Oleh Karamushka	2008	4	0
104	MF	(Ukraine) Anatoliy Matkevych	2007–2010	4	0
104	MF	(Ukraine) Ruslan Ivashko	2003	4	0
104	MF	(Ukraine) Andriy Yakymiv	2018–2019	4	0
104	DF	(Ukraine) Zaur Mamutov	2009	4	0
104	DF	(Ukraine) Oleh Karamushka	2003–2004	4	0
104	DF	(Ukraine) Volodymyr Gerasymets	1993–1994	3	0
104	DF	(Ukraine) Lubomyr Ivansky	2011–2012	3	0
104	MF	(Ukraine) Vyacheslav Akimov	2016–2017	3	0
104	MF	(Ukraine) Maksym Marusych	2016	3	0
104	MF	(Ukraine) Yuriy Stepanyuk	2011–2012	3	0
105	GK	(Georgia (country)) Nikoloz Kheladze	1993–1994	2	0
105	MF	(Ukraine) Yevheniy Belych	2018-2022	2	0
105	DF	(Ukraine) Vadym Kyrylov	2006-2007	2	0
105	DF	(Ukraine) Bohdan Biloshevskyi	2021	2	0
105	DF	(Ukraine) Andriy Pisnyi	2008	2	0
105	FW	(Ukraine) Vadym Kyrylov	2012	2	0
105	FW	(Ukraine) Ilya Seryi	2012–2014	2	0
105	DF	(Ukraine) Denys Volk-Karachevsky	2002–2003	1	0
105	DF	(Ukraine) Kristian Bilovar	2021	1	0
105	DF	(Romania) Constantin Dima	2021	1	0
105	DF	(Georgia (country)) Giorgi Parpalia	2008-2009	1	0
105	GK	(Ukraine) Yuriy Pankiv	2007	1	0
105	MF	(Soviet Union) Viktor Dohadailo	1981	1	0
105	FW	(Ukraine) Denys Demyanenko	2019-2022	1	0
105	MF	(Ukraine) Renat Mochulyak	2019-	1	0
105	MF	(Ukraine) Vitaliy Pryndeta	2019	1	0
105	GK	(Ukraine) Artem Padun	2000-2002	1	0
105	FW	(Ukraine) Yuriy Malyey	2011-2012	1	0
105	FW	(Ukraine) Andriy Vitoshynskyi	1999	1	0
105	MF	(Ukraine) Dmytro Trukhin	2002-2003	1	0
105	DF	(Ukraine) Serhiy Shpak	2005-2006	1	0

== Managerial records ==
- Longest-serving manager: Oleksandr Ryabokon (9 years)

== Presidential records ==
- Longest-serving President: Ivan Chaus - September 1999 — August 2007 (8 Years)

== Foreign players ==
The List of Foreign Players of Desna Chernihiv.

=== Foreigners ===
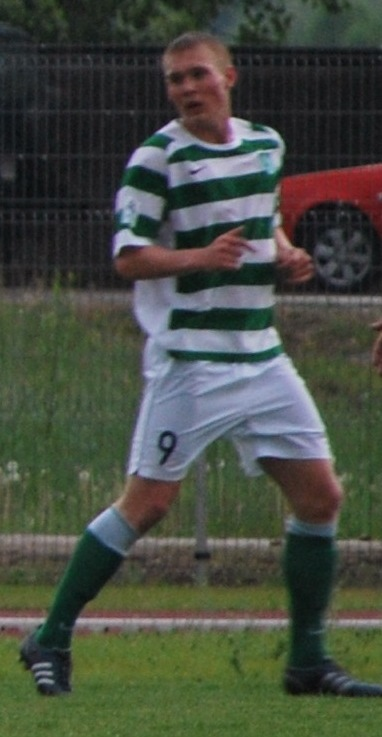
Joonas Tamm played for Desna Chernihiv from 2020 until 2021. He won the Baltic Cup in 2020 with Estonia

Country Born:	Nationality:	Name:	Season:	Position:	Caps:	Goals:
Soviet Union	Azerbaijan	Vladislav Nosenko	2002–2004	Defender	22	0
Belarus	(Belarus) Bielarusian	Artyom Khatskevich	2021-	Midfielder	0	0
Estonia	(Estonia) Estonian	Joonas Tamm	2020 – 2021	Defender	33	2
(Georgia (country)) Georgia	(Georgia (country)) Georgian	Giorgi Gadrani	2018	Midfielder	7	0
(Georgia (country)) Georgia	(Georgia (country)) Georgian	Giorgi Parpalia	2008–2009	Defender	1	0
(Georgia (country)) Georgia	(Georgia (country)) Georgian	Levan Arveladze	2016–2018 & 2020 – 2021	Midfielder	82	11
(Georgia (country)) Georgia	(Georgia (country)) Georgian	Luka Koberidze	2016–2018	Midfielder	69	1
Soviet Union	(Georgia (country)) Georgian	Anzor Kavteladze	1993–1994 & 1994–1995	Midfielder	23	1
Soviet Union	(Georgia (country)) Georgian	Levan Gulordava	2010–2011 & 2013–2014	Striker	21	4
Soviet Union	(Georgia (country)) Georgian	David Rukhadze	1993-1994	Defender	9	0
Soviet Union	(Georgia (country)) Georgian	Gocha Gogokhia	1993-1993 & 1994-1995 & 1998-1999	Striker	48	9
Soviet Union	(Georgia (country)) Georgian	Kakhaberi Sartania	1993–1994 & 1994–2000	Defender	136	2
Soviet Union	(Georgia (country)) Georgian	Vitaly Navrozashvili	2001–2002	Defender	12	0
Soviet Union	(Georgia (country)) Georgian	Nikoloz Kheladze	1993–1994	Goalkeeper	2	0
Greece	(Greece) Greek	Georgios Ermidis	2020 – 2022	Midfielder	0	0
Guinea	(Guinea) Guinean	Mamadi Sangare	2007–2009	Midfielder	31	1
Soviet Union	Kazakhstan	Vladimir Martynov	1997 & 1999	Defender/Forward	13	3
Soviet Union	Kyrgyzstan	Stanislav Tyulenev	1994–1995	Goalkeeper/	3	0
Soviet Union	(Moldova) Moldovan	Vadym Kyrylov	2006–2007	Forward	2	0
Romania	(Romania) Romanian	Constantin Dima	2021	Defender	1	0
(Socialist Federal Republic of Yugoslavia) SFR Yugoslavia	(Serbia) Serbian	Milan Zagorac	2003–2004	Defender	25	0

=== Dual citizenship ===
Citizenship:	Dual Citizenship:	Name:	Season:	Position:	Caps:	Goals:
(Georgia (country)) Georgian	(Ukraine) Ukrainian	Gocha Gogokhia	1993-1993 & 1994-1995 & 1998-1999	Forward	48	9
(Georgia (country)) Georgian	(Ukraine) Ukrainian	Kakhaberi Sartania	1993–1994 & 1994–2000	Defender	136	2
(Georgia (country)) Georgian	(Ukraine) Ukrainian	Levan Arveladze	2016–2018 & 2020 – 2021	Midfielder	82	11
(Georgia (country)) Georgian	(Ukraine) Ukrainian	Levan Gulordava	2010–2011 & 2013–2014	Forward	21	4
Guinea	(Ukraine) Ukrainian	Mamadi Sangare	2007–2009	Midfielder	31	1
Kazakhstan	(Ukraine) Ukrainian	Yevhen Shyryayev	2011–2012	Goalkeeper	18	0
Kyrgyzstan	(Ukraine) Ukrainian	Stanislav Tyulenev	1994–1995	Goalkeeper	3	0
Moldova	(Ukraine) Ukrainian	Vadym Kyrylov	2006–2007	Forward	2	0
Nigeria	(Ukraine) Ukrainian	Aderinsola Eseola	2015	Forward	15	5
(Russia) Russian	(Ukraine) Ukrainian	Vladyslav Kalitvintsev	2019 – 2021	Midfielder	63	10
(Russia) Russian	(Ukraine) Ukrainian	Yuriy Pleshakov	2013–2014	Forward	18	5
(Russia) Russian	(Ukraine) Ukrainian	Artem Beloshapka	2011–2013	Goalkeeper	10	0
(Russia) Russian	(Ukraine) Ukrainian	Dmytro Tyapushkin	1988–1990	Goalkeeper	116	0
(Russia) Russian	(Ukraine) Ukrainian	Volodymyr Prychynenko	1986–1988	Defender/Midfielder	87	0
(Russia) Russian	(Ukraine) Ukrainian	Vladimir Martynov	1997 & 1999	Defender/Forward	13	3
Russia	(Ukraine) Ukrainian	Anatoliy Verteletsky	2006–2007	Midfielder	16	0
Russia	(Ukraine) Ukrainian	Igor Vysochansky	1997–1998	Midfielder	13	0
Russia	(Ukraine) Ukrainian	Gennadiy Lagomina	1994–1996	Defender/Forward	31	1
Russia	(Ukraine) Ukrainian	Oleksandr Masalov	2021–2022	Defender	6	0

=== Other ===
Country Born:	Country moved:	Nationality:	Name:	Season:	Position:	Caps:	Goals:
East Germany	Soviet Union	(Ukraine) Ukrainian	Oleh Kuznetsov	1981–1982	Midfielder	86	0
Soviet Union	Kazakhstan	(Ukraine) Ukrainian	Vladimir Martynov	1997 & 1999	Defender/Forward	13	3
(Socialist Federal Republic of Yugoslavia) SFR Yugoslavia	Serbia and Montenegro	(Serbia) Serbian	Milan Zagorac	2003–2004	Defender	25	0
Soviet Union	Ukraine	(Ukraine) Ukrainian	Andriy Yarmolenko	2006–2007	Midfielder	9	4
(Czech Republic) Czechoslovakia	Ukraine	(Ukraine) Ukrainian	Mykhaylo Kozak	2013–2015 & 2018–2019	Midfielder	42	0
Hungary	Ukraine	(Ukraine) Ukrainian	Kristian Bilovar	2021	Defender	1	0
Soviet Union	Russia	(Ukraine) Ukrainian	Serhiy Sitalo	2014–2016	Goalkeeper	35	0
Soviet Union	Russia	(Ukraine) Ukrainian	Dmytro Lelyuk	2002–2003	Defender	12	1
Soviet Union	Russia	(Ukraine) Ukrainian	Roman Voynarovskyi	2009–2010	Midfielder	10	2
Soviet Union	Russia	(Ukraine) Ukrainian	Anatoliy Verteletsky	2006–2007	Midfielder	16	0
Soviet Union	(Georgia (country)) Georgian	(Ukraine) Ukrainian	Temur Partsvania	2017	Defender	18	1

== Captains ==
List of Captains of Desna Chernihiv since 1960

Player	Period As Captain	Period in the Club	Position	Caps	Goals
(Soviet Union) Ivan Kamyshev	1960	1960	Midfielder	9	1
(Soviet Union) Yevhen Maslennikov	1960	1960	Midfielder	29	5
(Soviet Union) Anatoliy Matyukhin	1961-1964	1961-1964	Defender	111	0
(Soviet Union) Valeriy Kravchinsky	1964–1970	1960–1970	Midfielder	383	3
(Soviet Union) Mikhail Chabaida	1970	1968-1970 & 1977-1978	Defender	171	2
(Soviet Union) (Ukraine) Igor Chetverik	1987-1994	1987-1994	Midfielder	241	56
(Ukraine) Yuriy Nadtochiy	1994-1995	1985 & 1990–1996	Defender	277	5
(Ukraine) Vadym Postovoy	1999–2001	1988–1990 & 1999–2001	Midfielder	137	16
(Ukraine) Vadym Melnyk	2016-2018	2012-2018	Midfielder	173	13
(Ukraine) Denys Favorov	2018-2020	2016-2020	Midfielder	139	39
(Ukraine) Vladyslav Ohirya	2020-2021	2017-2021	Midfielder	92	0
(Ukraine) Yehor Kartushov	2021-2022	2012–2022	Midfielder	244	33

In bold the player that are still playing for the club

== Honours and distinctions ==
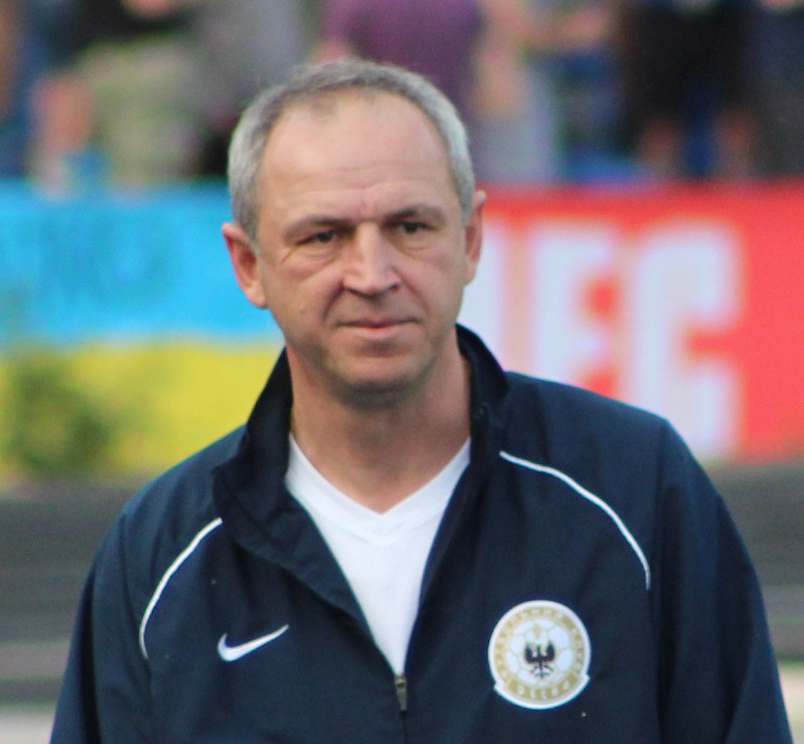
Oleksandr Ryabokon, the head-coach era of FC Desna, since 2012 and elected Best Coach of Ukrainian First League in 2016–17

=== Domestic competitions ===
- Ukrainian First League

Runners-up (1): 2016–17

- Ukrainian Second League

Winners (3): 1996–97 (Group A), 2005–06 (Group A), 2012–13 (Group A) (record)
Runners-up (4): 2000–01 (Group C), 2003–04 (Group C), 2004–05 (Group C), 2011–12 (Group A)

- Cup of the Ukrainian SSR

Semifinal (1) 1990

- Championship of the Ukrainian SSR

Runners-up (2): 1982, 1966
Runners-up (1): 1968

- Ukrainian Amateur Football Championship

Winners (1): 1976 as Khimik Chernihiv

- Ukrainian First League

Winners (1) Fair Play award 2017–18 season

- Ukrainian Premier League

Winners (1) Fair Play award 2019–20 season

=== Individual player and coach awards ===
[[File:Денис Фаворов. 23 вересня 2018.jpg|thumb|200px|right|{{center|Denys Favorov - Elected Ukrainian Footballer of the Year in 2020}]] Ukrainian Footballer of the Year

- (Ukraine) Denys Favorov 2020 (Desna, Zorya)

Best Coach of Ukrainian First League

- (Ukraine) Oleksandr Ryabokon 2016–17

Best Player of Ukrainian First League

- (Ukraine) Denys Favorov 2017–18

Top scorer of Ukrainian Second League

- (Ukraine) Oleksandr Kozhemyachenko: 2010–11 (12 goals)
- (Ukraine) Oleksandr Kozhemyachenko: 2004–05 (20 goals)
- (Ukraine) Oleksandr Kozhemyachenko: 2005–06 (21 goals)

Top Scorer Ukrainian Premier League Reserves (Under 21)

- (Ukraine) Illya Shevtsov 2019–20

== European record ==
Desna qualified for European football for the first time in the 2020–21 season, where they made their debut in the Europa League.

Season	Competition	Round	Club	Home	Away	Aggregate
2020–21	UEFA Europa League	3QR	(Germany) VfL Wolfsburg	—N/a	0–2	—N/a

=== UEFA club rankings ===
Rank	Country	Team	Points	Years
197	(Ukraine)	Desna Chernihiv	5.520	2022

As of 23 April 2022.
