= 2006–07 FC Desna Chernihiv season =

FC Desna Chernihiv
2006–07 season
- President: Ivan Chaus
- Manager: Oleksandr Tomakh
- Stadium: Chernihiv Stadium
- Ukrainian First League: 14th
- Ukrainian Cup: Round of 32 (1/16)
- Top goalscorer: League: Valentyn Krukovets (13); All: Valentyn Krukovets (13)
| Home colours | Away colours |

For the 2006–07 season, FC Desna Chernihiv competed in the Ukrainian First League.

== Transfers ==
=== In ===
| Date | Pos. | Player | Age | Moving from | Type | Fee | Source |
Summer
| 15 June 2006 | MF | (Ukraine) Andriy Yarmolenko | 20 | (Ukraine) Yunist Chernihiv | Transfer | Free | |
| 15 June 2006 | DF | (Ukraine) Volodymyr Polishchuk | 20 | (Ukraine) Borysfen Boryspil | Transfer | Free | |
| 15 June 2007 | DF | (Ukraine) Serhiy Cherniy | 20 | (Ukraine) Borysfen Boryspil | Transfer | Free | |
| 15 July 2006 | MF | (Ukraine) Oleksandr Babor | 20 | (Ukraine) Dnipro Cherkasy | Transfer | Free | |
| 15 June 2006 | MF | (Ukraine) Yakiv Kripak | 20 | (Ukraine) FC ZAlK Zaporizhzhia | Transfer | Free | |
| 15 June 2006 | FW | (Ukraine) Vadym Antipov | 20 | (Ukraine) FC Obriy Nikopol | Transfer | Free | |
| 15 June 2006 | FW | (Moldova) Vadym Kyrylov | 20 | (Ukraine) Zorya Luhansk | Transfer | Free | |
Winter
| 15 January 2007 | GK | (Ukraine) Yuriy Pankiv | 38 | (Ukraine) Karpaty Lviv | Transfer | Free | |
| 15 January 2007 | DF | (Ukraine) Maksym Stankevych | 38 | (Ukraine) Borysfen Boryspil | Transfer | Free | |
| 15 January 2007 | MF | (Ukraine) Ihor Myhalatiuk | 20 | (Ukraine) Enerhetyk Burshtyn | Transfer | Free | |
| 15 January 2007 | FW | (Ukraine) Ruslan Yermolenko | 20 | (Ukraine) Borysfen Boryspil | Transfer | Free | |

=== Out ===
| Date | Pos. | Player | Age | Moving to | Type | Fee | Source |
Summer
| 15 July 2006 | MF | (Ukraine) Oleksandr Babor | 20 | (Ukraine) Dnipro Cherkasy | Transfer | Free | |
| 15 July 2006 | MF | (Ukraine) Serhiy Hamal | 20 | (Ukraine) Bukovyna Chernivtsi | Transfer | Free | |
| 15 July 2006 | DF | (Ukraine) Serhiy Shpak | 20 | (Ukraine) Volyn Lutsk | Loan Return | Free | |
| 15 June 2006 | MF | (Ukraine) Yaroslav Bykovets | 20 | Unattached | Transfer | | |
Winter
| 15 January 2007 | MF | (Ukraine) Vitaliy Havrysh | 20 | (Ukraine) Stal Alchevsk | Transfer | Free | |
| 15 January 2007 | MF | (Ukraine) Andriy Yarmolenko | 20 | (Ukraine) Dynamo-2 Kyiv | Transfer | Free | |
| 15 January 2007 | DF | (Ukraine) Volodymyr Polishchuk | 20 | (Ukraine) Knyazha Shchaslyve | Transfer | Free | |
| 15 January 2007 | DF | (Ukraine) Serhiy Cherniy | 20 | (Ukraine) Borysfen Boryspil | Transfer | Free | |
| 15 January 2007 | MF | (Ukraine) Anatoliy Verteletsky | 20 | (Ukraine) Mykolaiv | Transfer | Free | |
| 15 January 2007 | DF | (Ukraine) Volodymyr Polishchuk | 20 | (Ukraine) Knyazha Shchaslyve | Transfer | Free | |
| 15 January 2007 | FW | (Ukraine) Ihor Bobovych | 20 | (Belarus) Smorgon | Transfer | Free | |
| 15 January 2007 | FW | (Moldova) Vadym Kyrylov | 20 | (Ukraine) Nyva Ternopil | Transfer | Free | |

== Statistics ==
=== Appearances and goals ===
| No. | Pos | Nat | Player | Total | | Premier League | | Cup | |
| No. | Pos | Nat | Player | Apps | Goals | Apps | Goals | Apps | Goals |
Goalkeepers
| | GK | (Ukraine) UKR | Yuriy Pankiv | 1 | 0 | 1 | 0 | 0 | 0 |
| | GK | (Ukraine) UKR | Viktor Litvin | 28 | 0 | 28 | 0 | 0 | 0 |
| | GK | (Ukraine) UKR | Artem Koleda | 10 | 0 | 10 | 0 | 0 | 0 |
Defenders
| | DF | (Ukraine) UKR | Oleksandr Polunytskiy | 10 | 0 | 10 | 0 | 0 | 0 |
| | DF | (Ukraine) UKR | Volodymyr Chulanov | 33 | 0 | 33 | 0 | 0 | 0 |
| | DF | (Ukraine) UKR | Volodymyr Polishchuk | 16 | 0 | 16 | 0 | 0 | 0 |
| | DF | (Ukraine) UKR | Tymur Rustamov | 5 | 0 | 5 | 0 | 0 | 0 |
| | DF | (Ukraine) UKR | Serhiy Cherniy | 13 | 0 | 13 | 0 | 0 | 0 |
| | DF | (Ukraine) UKR | Ivan Bohatyr | 16 | 0 | 16 | 0 | 0 | 0 |
| | DF | (Ukraine) UKR | Maksym Stankevych | 12 | 0 | 12 | 0 | 0 | 0 |
Midfielders
| | MF | (Ukraine) UKR | Valentyn Krukovets | 33 | 13 | 33 | 13 | 0 | 0 |
| | MF | (Ukraine) UKR | Ihor Bobovych | 13 | 2 | 13 | 2 | 0 | 0 |
| | MF | (Ukraine) UKR | Oleh Kerchu | 8 | 0 | 8 | 0 | 0 | 0 |
| | MF | (Ukraine) UKR | Vitaliy Havrysh | 18 | 5 | 18 | 5 | 0 | 0 |
| | MF | (Ukraine) UKR | Ihor Myhalatiuk | 9 | 1 | 9 | 1 | 0 | 0 |
| | MF | (Ukraine) UKR | Anatoliy Verteletsky | 15 | 0 | 15 | 0 | 0 | 0 |
| | MF | (Ukraine) UKR | Pavlo Shchedrakov | 32 | 2 | 32 | 2 | 0 | 0 |
| | MF | (Ukraine) UKR | Dmytro Kolodin | 33 | 7 | 33 | 7 | 0 | 0 |
| | MF | (Ukraine) UKR | Oleksandr Babor | 15 | 1 | 15 | 1 | 0 | 0 |
Forwards
| | FW | (Moldova) MDA | Vadym Kyrylov | 2 | 0 | 2 | 0 | 0 | 0 |
| | FW | (Ukraine) UKR | Vadym Antipov | 26 | 1 | 26 | 1 | 0 | 0 |
| | FW | (Ukraine) UKR | Ruslan Ermolenkov | 14 | 1 | 14 | 1 | 0 | 0 |
| | FW | (Ukraine) UKR | Andriy Yarmolenko | 8 | 4 | 8 | 4 | 0 | 0 |
| | FW | (Ukraine) UKR | Yakiv Kripak | 6 | 0 | 6 | 0 | 0 | 0 |
| | FW | (Ukraine) UKR | Oleksandr Kozhemyachenko | 34 | 9 | 34 | 9 | 0 | 0 |
| | FW | (Ukraine) UKR | Sergey Alayev | 28 | 3 | 28 | 3 | 0 | 0 |

Source: Competitions

Last updated: 31 May 2019

=== Goalscorers ===
| Rank | No. | Pos | Nat | Name | Premier League | Cup | Europa League | Total |
|---|---|---|---|---|---|---|---|---|
| 1 | | MF | (Ukraine) | Valentyn Krukovets | 13 | 0 | 0 | 13 |
| 2 | | FW | (Ukraine) | Oleksandr Kozhemyachenko | 9 | 0 | 0 | 9 |
| 2 | | MF | (Ukraine) | Dmytro Kolodin | 7 | 0 | 0 | 7 |
| 3 | | MF | (Ukraine) | Vitaliy Havrysh | 5 | 0 | 0 | 5 |
| 4 | | FW | (Ukraine) | Andriy Yarmolenko | 4 | 0 | 0 | 4 |
| 5 | | FW | (Ukraine) | Sergey Alayev | 3 | 0 | 0 | 3 |
| 6 | | MF | (Ukraine) | Ihor Bobovych | 2 | 0 | 0 | 2 |
| 6 | | MF | (Ukraine) | Pavlo Shchedrakov | 2 | 0 | 0 | 2 |
| 7 | | MF | (Ukraine) | Ihor Myhalatiuk | 1 | 0 | 0 | 1 |
| 7 | | FW | (Ukraine) | Vadym Antipov | 1 | 0 | 0 | 1 |
| 7 | | FW | (Ukraine) | Ruslan Ermolenkov | 1 | 0 | 0 | 1 |
| 7 | | MF | (Ukraine) | Oleksandr Babor | 1 | 0 | 0 | 1 |
| | | | | Total | 49 | 0 | 0 | 49 |

Last updated: 31 May 2019
