= 2012–13 FC Hoverla Uzhhorod season =

Hoverla
2012-13 season
- Chairman: (Ukraine) Yevhen Doroshenko
- Manager: (Ukraine) Oleksandr Sevidov
- Stadium: Avanhard Stadium
- Premier League: 15th
- Ukrainian Cup: Round of 16
- Top goalscorer: League: Mischenko (3); All: Mischenko (3)
- Highest home attendance: 6,500 vs Zorya
- Lowest home attendance: 4,700 vs Tavriya
- Average home league attendance: 5,525

The Hoverla 2012–13 season was Hoverla's sixth Ukrainian Premier League season, and their second season under manager Oleksandr Sevidov. During the season Hoverla will compete in the Ukrainian Premier League and Ukrainian Cup.

== Current squad ==
Squad is given according to Ukrainian Premier League official website of August 31, 2012. Note: Flags indicate national team as defined under FIFA eligibility rules; some limited exceptions apply. Players may hold more than one non-FIFA nationality.

No.	Pos.	Nation	Player
1	GK	UKR	Oleksandr Nad' (captain)
2	DF	UKR	Oleh Dopilka (on loan from Dynamo Kyiv)
3	DF	UKR	Pavlo Shchedrakov
7	MF	MNE	Mirko Raičević
8	MF	SRB	Aleksandar Trišović
9	FW	UKR	Oleh Mischenko (on loan from Metalurh Donetsk)
10	FW	UKR	Oleksandr Kosyrin
11	MF	UKR	Stanislav Pechonkin
13	DF	UKR	Yevhen Yeliseyev
15	MF	UKR	Dmytro Trukhin
17	DF	UKR	Serhiy Boyko
18	MF	UKR	Oleksandr Sytnyk
19	MF	UKR	Yevhen Makarenko (on loan from Dynamo Kyiv)

No.	Pos.	Nation	Player
21	DF	ARM	Yegishe Melikyan
22	MF	ARM	Arthur Yedigaryan
23	MF	UKR	Vladyslav Mykulyak
28	DF	MDA	Vitalie Bordian
29	DF	UKR	Andriy Hrinchenko
33	GK	UKR	Dmytro Babenko
34	DF	SRB	Bojan Mališić
37	MF	GER	David Odonkor
44	MF	GRE	Sotiris Balafas
76	FW	FRA	Damien Le Tallec
88	MF	ESP	Jordi López
99	FW	BUL	Svetoslav Todorov

== Competitions ==
=== 2012-13 Ukrainian Premier League ===
==== Results summary ====
Overall								Home						Away					
Pld	W	D	L	GF	GA	GD	Pts	W	D	L	GF	GA	GD	W	D	L	GF	GA	GD
21	2	5	14	19	43	−24	11	2	3	5	10	17	−7	0	2	9	9	26	−17

Last updated: 18 March 2013.
Source: Soccerway

==== Results by round ====
Round	1	2	3	4	5	6	7	8	9	10	11	12	13	14	15	16	17	18	19	20	21	22	23	24	25	26	27	28	29	30
Ground	A	H	A	H	A	H	A	H	A	H	A	A	H	A	H	H	A	H	A	H	A	H	A	H	A	H	H	A	H	A
Result	L	L	L	L	L	L	L	W	D	W	L	D	D	L	D	D	L	L	L	L	L									
Position	10	13	16	16	16	16	16	15	15	15	15	15	15	15	15	15	15	15	15	15	15									

Source: Soccerway
A = Away; H = Home; W = Win; D = Draw; L = Loss

==== Results ====
14 July 2012 Match 1	Chornomorets	3 – 2	Hoverla	Odesa
20:00	Leo Matos 15', 44'; Yeliseyev 33' (o.g.)	Summary	Mishchenko 52'; Trukhin 68'	Stadium: Chornomorets Stadium; Attendance: 23,583; Referee: Andriy Kuzmin

21 July 2012 Match 2	Hoverla	1 – 3	Shakhtar	Lviv
17:00	Raičević 85'	Summary	Mkhitaryan 51'; Ilsinho 52'; Seleznyov 90+3'	Stadium: Arena Lviv; Attendance: 5,100; Referee: Kostiantyn Trukhanov

27 July 2012 Match 3	Dynamo	3 – 1	Hoverla	Kyiv
19:00	Husyev 30'; Ideye Brown 86', 90+2'	Summary	Kosyrin 20'	Stadium: NSC Olimpiyskiy; Attendance: 20,153; Referee: Yuri Hrysio

3 August 2012 Match 4	Hoverla	0 – 1	Zorya	Uzhhorod
20:00		Summary	Lipartia 84' (pen.)	Stadium: Avanhard Stadium; Attendance: 6,500; Referee: Vitaliy Romanov

11 August 2012 Match 5	Dnipro	4 – 1	Hoverla	Dnipropetrovsk
19:30	Zozulya 12', 90+3'; Rotan 73'; Giuliano Victor 87'	Summary	Melikyan 54'; Shchedrakov (yellow card) 63' (yellow-red card) 90+2'	Stadium: Dnipro Arena; Attendance: 15,626; Referee: Dmytro Kutakov

18 August 2012 Match 6	Hoverla	0 – 3	Metalist	Uzhhorod
16:00		Summary	Cristaldo 17', 81' (pen.); Willian Gomes 30'	Stadium: Avanhard Stadium; Attendance: 5,800; Referee: Serhiy Boiko

25 August 2012 Match 7	Illichivets	2 – 0	Hoverla	Mariupol
17:00		Summary		Stadium: Illichivets Stadium; Attendance: 7,500; Referee: Yevhen Aranovskiy

31 August 2012 Match 8	Hoverla	2 – 1	Tavriya	Uzhhorod
19:00	Mishchenko 14'; Odonkor 36'	Summary	Kalynychenko 90+4'	Stadium: Avanhard Stadium; Attendance: 4,700; Referee: Yuri Hrysio

15 September 2012 Match 9	Metalurh Zaporizhya	1 – 1	Hoverla	Zaporizhya
14:00	Teikeu 63'	Summary	Mischenko 4'; Raičević (yellow card) 75' (yellow-red card) 88'	Stadium: Slavutych-Arena; Attendance: 4,500; Referee: Yuri Moseichuk

30 September 2012 Match 10	Hoverla	2 – 1	Metalurh Donetsk	Uzhhorod
16:00	Odonkor 54' (pen.); Mališić 86'	Summary	Ghazaryan 69'	Stadium: Avanhard Stadium; Attendance: 5,250; Referee: Anatoliy Abdula

6 October 2012 Match 11	Arsenal	2 – 0	Hoverla	Kyiv
17:30	Homenyuk 45+1'; Kovpak 68'	Summary		Stadium: Valeriy Lobanovskyi; Attendance: 1,728; Referee: Yuri Mozharovskyi

21 October 2012 Match 12	Karpaty	1 - 1	Hoverla	Lviv
17:30	Ksyonz (yellow card) 47'; Hladkyi 55'; Milošević (yellow card) 75'; Daushvili (yellow card) 80'	Summary	Raičević 45'; Yevhen Yeliseyev (yellow card) 68'; Balafas (yellow card) 76'	Stadium: Ukraina Stadium; Attendance: 12,800; Referee: Olexander Derdo

27 October 2013 Match 13	Hoverla	1 - 1	Kryvbas Kryvyi Rih	Avanhard Stadium
14:00	Makarenko (yellow card) 34'; Raičević 89'	Summary	Lobjanidze (yellow card) 28'; Bartulović 35'; Lysytskyi (yellow card) 90+3'	Attendance: 1,950; Referee: Sergiy Lysenchuk

4 November 2013 Match 14	Volyn Lutsk	2 - 1	Hoverla	Avanhard Stadium
17:30	Bicfalvi (yellow card) 19' (yellow-red card); Vladimir Arzhanov 41'; Savić 56'; Šikov (yellow card) 67'; Stević (yellow card) 83'; Litovchenko (yellow card) 89'	Summary	Le Tallec 60'; Bordian (yellow card) 90'	Attendance: 3,100; Referee: Sergiy Dankovskyi

==== League table ====
Pos	Team	Pld	W	D	L	GF	GA	GD	Pts
12	Vorskla Poltava	30	8	7	15	31	36	−5	31
13	Volyn Lutsk	30	7	8	15	26	45	−19	29
14	Karpaty Lviv	30	7	6	17	37	52	−15	27
15	Hoverla Uzhhorod	30	5	7	18	29	57	−28	22
16	Metalurh Zaporizhya	30	1	8	21	12	64	−52	11

Source: uafootball.net.ua
Rules for classification: 1st points; 2nd goal difference; 3rd goals scored; 4th head-to-head points; 5th head-to-head goal difference; 6th head-to-head goals scored; 7th fair play; 8th draw (Regulation, p.52-53).

=== 2012-13 Ukrainian Cup Results ===
23 September 2012; Round of 32	Helios Kharkiv	0 – 1	Hoverla	Kharkiv Oblast
16:00		Summary	Balafas 79'	Stadium: Sonyachniy Stadium, Pyatykhatka; Attendance: 1,200; Referee: Serhiy Berezka (Kyiv Oblast)

31 October 2012 Round of 16	Hoverla	v	Shakhtar Donetsk	Uzhhorod
				Stadium: Avanhard Stadium

== Squad statistics ==
=== Goal scorers ===
As of 7 October 2012

Place	Position	Nation	Number	Name	Premier League	Ukrainian Cup	Total
1	FW	(Ukraine)	9	Oleh Mischenko	3	0	3
2	MF	(Germany)	37	David Odonkor	2	0	2
3	MF	(Greece)	44	Sotiris Balafas	0	1	1
3	FW	(Ukraine)	10	Oleksandr Kosyrin	1	0	1
3	DF	(Serbia)	34	Bojan Mališić	1	0	1
3	DF	(Armenia)	21	Yegishe Melikyan	1	0	1
3	MF	(Montenegro)	7	Mirko Raičević	1	0	1
3	MF	(Ukraine)	15	Dmytro Trukhin	1	0	1
				TOTALS	10	1	11

=== Appearances and goals ===
As of 7 October 2012

No.	Pos	Nat	Player	Total		Premier League		Ukrainian Cup	
No.	Pos	Nat	Player	Apps	Goals	Apps	Goals	Apps	Goals
1	GK	(Ukraine) UKR	Oleksandr Nad'	5	0	5	0	0	0
2	DF	(Ukraine) UKR	Oleh Dopilka	2	0	2	0	0	0
3	DF	(Ukraine) UKR	Pavlo Shchedrakov	6	0	6	0	0	0
7	MF	(Montenegro) MNE	Mirko Raičević	9	1	9	1	0	0
8	MF	(Serbia) SRB	Aleksandar Trišović	5	0	1+4	0	0	0
9	FW	(Ukraine) UKR	Oleh Mischenko	9	3	6+3	3	0	0
10	FW	(Ukraine) UKR	Oleksandr Kosyrin	9	1	3+5	1	0+1	0
11	MF	(Ukraine) UKR	Stanislav Pechonkin	8	0	7+1	0	0	0
12	GK	(Ukraine) UKR	Anton Yashkov	1	0	0	0	1	0
13	DF	(Ukraine) UKR	Yevhen Yeliseyev	11	0	10	0	1	0
15	MF	(Ukraine) UKR	Dmytro Trukhin	12	1	11	1	1	0
18	MF	(Ukraine) UKR	Oleksandr Sytnyk	5	0	1+3	0	0+1	0
19	MF	(Ukraine) UKR	Yevhen Makarenko	9	0	7+1	0	1	0
21	DF	(Armenia) ARM	Yegishe Melikyan	5	1	4+1	1	0	0
22	MF	(Armenia) ARM	Arthur Yedigaryan	6	0	4+1	0	1	0
23	MF	(Ukraine) UKR	Vladyslav Mykulyak	7	0	4+2	0	0+1	0
28	DF	(Moldova) MDA	Vitalie Bordian	4	0	3	0	1	0
29	DF	(Ukraine) UKR	Andriy Hrinchenko	2	0	2	0	0	0
33	GK	(Ukraine) UKR	Dmytro Babenko	6	0	6	0	0	0
34	DF	(Serbia) SRB	Bojan Mališić	11	1	10	1	1	0
37	MF	(Germany) GER	David Odonkor	11	2	10+1	2	0	0
44	MF	(Greece) GRE	Sotiris Balafas	7	1	4+2	0	1	1
76	FW	(France) FRA	Damien Le Tallec	3	0	0+2	0	1	0
88	MF	(Spain) ESP	Jordi López	6	0	2+3	0	1	0
99	FW	(Bulgaria) BUL	Svetoslav Todorov	4	0	2+1	0	1	0
Players who appeared for Hoverla who left the club during the season:
28	FW	(Ukraine) UKR	Mykola Hibalyuk	3	0	2+1	0	0	0
77	MF	(Ukraine) UKR	Serhiy Valyayev	1	0	0+1	0	0	0

=== Disciplinary record ===
Number	Nation	Position	Name	Premier League		Ukrainian Cup		Total	
Number	Nation	Position	Name	Yellow card	Red card	Yellow card	Red card	Yellow card	Red card
1	(Ukraine)	GK	Oleksandr Nad'	2	0	0	0	2	0
2	(Ukraine)	DF	Oleh Dopilka	1	0	0	0	1	0
3	(Ukraine)	DF	Pavlo Shchedrakov	1	1	0	0	1	1
7	(Montenegro)	MF	Mirko Raičević	4	1	0	0	4	1
8	(Serbia)	MF	Aleksandar Trišović	1	0	0	0	1	0
10	(Ukraine)	FW	Oleksandr Kosyrin	3	0	0	0	3	0
12	(Ukraine)	GK	Anton Yashkov	0	0	1	0	1	0
13	(Ukraine)	DF	Yevhen Yeliseyev	2	0	0	0	2	0
11	(Ukraine)	MF	Stanislav Pechonkin	1	0	0	0	1	0
15	(Ukraine)	MF	Dmytro Trukhin	2	0	0	0	2	0
21	(Armenia)	DF	Yegishe Melikyan	1	0	0	0	1	0
22	(Armenia)	MF	Arthur Yedigaryan	2	0	0	0	2	0
23	(Ukraine)	MF	Vladyslav Mykulyak	2	0	0	0	2	0
28	(Ukraine)	FW	Mykola Hibalyuk	1	0	0	0	1	0
29	(Ukraine)	DF	Andriy Hrinchenko	1	0	0	0	1	0
33	(Ukraine)	GK	Dmytro Babenko	3	0	0	0	3	0
34	(Serbia)	DF	Bojan Mališić	3	0	0	0	3	0
37	(Germany)	MF	David Odonkor	2	0	0	0	2	0
44	(Greece)	MF	Sotiris Balafas	2	0	0	0	2	0
			TOTALS	34	2	1	0	35	2
