= Prychynenko =

Prychynenko may refer to

- Denis Prychynenko (born 1992), German-Ukrainian footballer who has played for Heart of Midlothian
- Serhiy Prychynenko (born 1960), Ukrainian footballer, father of Denis
- Stanislav Prychynenko (born 1991), Ukrainian International footballer who has played for SC Tavriya Simferopol
- Volodymyr Prychynenko (born 1960), Ukrainian football coach and player, twin brother of Serhiy, father of Stanislav
