= Krawczyński =

Krawczyński (masculine), Krawczyńska (feminine) is a Polish-language surname. Russian form: Kravchinsky, Uktrainian: Kravchynskyi.

Notable people with the surname include:

- Ilona Krawczyńska (born 1992), Polish model, TV presenter, blogger and influencer
- Stanisław Krawczyński (conductor) (born 1955), Polish conductor, rector of the Academy of Music in Krakow
- Stanisław Krawczyński (physician) (1884–1940), Polish physician and statesman, MP
- Zev Krawczynski, birth name of Wolf Gold (1889–1956), rabbi, Polish Jewish activist, and one of the signatories of the Israeli declaration of independence
