= Yevhen Maslennikov =

Association football player (born 1937)

Personal information
- Full name: Евгений Евсеевич Масленников
- Date of birth: 21 June 1937 (age 89)
- Place of birth: Soviet Union
- Positions: Midfielder; striker

Senior career*
Years	Team	Apps	(Gls)
1958	Veres Rivne	5	(0)
1959	Shakhtar (Korostyshiv)	0	(0)
1960	Avanhard Chernihiv	29	(5)
1961–1962	Polissya Zhytomyr	60	(9)
1963–1964	Spartak Ivano-Frankivsk	59	(9)
- * Club domestic league appearances and goals

Yevhen Maslennikov (Russian: Евгений Евсеевич Масленников; born 27 December 1937) is a retired Soviet football player who played as a midfielder and striker.

== Career ==
Yevhen Maslennikov started his career in 1949 with Veres Rivne, where he played 15 games. On April 20, 1958, the Veres Kolkhoznik held its first official match in the championship of the teams of masters of class "B" of the USSR championship. The rival was the players of the LTI team (Leningrad Institute of Technology). The score of the match was 0: 0. In 1960 the Avanhard Chernihiv was established in the city of Chernihiv and he was hired by the club where he played 29 games scoring 5 goals and here he also become captain of the club. From 1961 to 1962, he played for Polissya Zhytomyr, where he played 60 matches and scoring 9 goals. On 11 June and on 12 June 1961, he played against Dynamo Khmelnytskyi in Soviet Cup in the 1961 Soviet Cup. From 1963 to 1964, he played for Spartak Ivano-Frankivsk, where he played 59 scoring 9 goals.

Preceded by Ivan Kamyshev	Captain of Desna Chernihiv; 1960	Succeeded by Anatoliy Matyukhin
