= Anatoliy Matyukhin =

Association football player

Personal information
- Full name: Valeriy Kyrylovych Kravchynskyi
- Date of birth: 27 December 1930 (age 95)
- Place of birth: Chernihiv, Soviet Union (now Ukraine)
- Positions: Midfielder; defender

Senior career*
Years	Team	Apps	(Gls)
1949	Dinamo Yerevan	15	(0)
1949–1953	Dynamo Kyiv	10	(2)
1954–1958	CSKA Kyiv	135	(8)
1959–1960	Arsenal Kyiv	29	(2)
1961–1964	Desna Chernihiv	111	(0)
- * Club domestic league appearances and goals

Anatoly Terentyevich Matyukhin (Ukrainian: Матюхин Анатолий Терентьевич; born 27 December 1930) is a retired Soviet football defender. He spend most of his career with CSKA Kyiv and Desna Chernihiv the main club in Chernihiv.

Preceded by Yevhen Maslennikov	Captain of Desna Chernihiv; 1961-1964	Succeeded by Valeriy Kravchinsky
