= Ivan Kamyshev =

Association football player

Yevhen Maslennikov
Personal information
- Full name: Евгений Евсеевич Масленников
- Date of birth: 21 June 1935 (age 91)
- Place of birth: Soviet Union
- Positions: Midfielder; striker

Senior career*
Years	Team	Apps	(Gls)
1959	Shakhtar (Korostyshiv)	5	(0)
1960	Avanhard Chernihiv	9	(1)
1962	NZF Nikopol	29	(0)
- * Club domestic league appearances and goals

Yevhen Maslennikov (Russian: Камышев Иван М.; born in 1930) is a retired Soviet footballer who played as a midfielder or striker.

== Career ==
Yevhen Maslennikov started his career in 1959 with Shakhtar (Korostyshiv) where he played 5 matches. In 1960 he moved to the city of Chernihiv in the side of the new formed team Avanhard Chernihiv, where played 9 matches as captain and he scored 1 goal in 1960. In 1962 he moved to NZF Nikopol, where he played 29 matches.

Preceded by {{{before}}}	Captain of Desna Chernihiv; 1960	Succeeded by Yevhen Maslennikov
