= Sotiris Balafas =

Greek professional footballer

Personal information
- Full name: Sotirios Balafas
- Date of birth: 19 August 1986 (age 40)
- Place of birth: Arta, Greece
- Height: 1.88 m (6 ft 2 in)
- Position: Defensive midfielder

Youth career
- 1998–2001: Amvrakikos Arta
- 2001–2002: Ethnikos Fillipiada

Senior career*
Years	Team	Apps	(Gls)
2002–2005	Anagennisi Arta	21	(2)
2005–2012	PAOK	108	(7)
2009–2010	→ PAS Giannina (loan)	11	(0)
2010	→ Ergotelis (loan)	8	(0)
2012–2014	Hoverla Uzhhorod	42	(3)
2014–2017	Veria	43	(4)
2017–2018	Kerkyra	20	(0)
2019–2021	Niki Volos	27	(0)
2022	Asteras Tripotamos		

International career
2006–2009	Greece U21	13	(1)
- * Club domestic league appearances and goals as of 31 August 2020

Sotiris Balafas (Greek: Σωτήρης Μπαλάφας; born 19 August 1986) is a Greek former professional footballer who played as a defensive midfielder. He was known for his defensive awareness, his tackling and heading skills as well as his pace and strength.

== Club career ==
Balafas started his career in Anagennisi Arta and became an integral part of the team at very young age. He was mostly performing the duties of a centre back in his old club in contrast to his later role at PAOK. In the summer of 2005 he was picked up by PAOK for a transfer fee of 80,000 Euros. After a while he became a first-team option. In the 2007–08 season he was the first choice defensive midfielder for most of the season and was cooperating well with newcomer Ricardo Matias Verón.

Holding a secondary role in Fernando Santos's plans for the 2009–10 season, Balafas agreed during the pre-season to move on loan to the newly promoted PAS Giannina for one year. It was reported that the main reason for his choice to play for a minor club, was the possibility to work again with his mentor Georgios Paraschos.

During the 2011–12 season, after a lot of injuries among more senior players of the team, Balafas took his chances for the UEFA Europa League and after the winning goal against FC Karpaty Lviv became a fan favorite and his manager László Bölöni gave him more chances of playing time.

In the 2012–13 season, he decided to play abroad for the Ukrainian club Hoverla. In May 2014 he was released from the club.

On 10 September 2014, the Super League club Veria signed Balafas on a free transfer. He made his official debut against PAS Giannina during the fifth matchday of the Super League. He scored his first goal for Veria in a 2–0 home win against Platanias as he opened the score. Balafas renewed his contract with Veria in May 2015 for two more years. His new contract was due to expire on 31 June 2017. On 22 August 2015, Balafas was injured during training. He was diagnosed with clot rupture and the estimated time of his cure was about three to four months.

== International career ==
He has been a basic part of the Greece national under-21 football team along with former PAOK teammates Stelios Iliadis and Lazaros Christodoulopoulos, being capped for more than 10 times.

== Club statistics ==
Club performance			League		Cup		Continental		Total	
Season	Club	League	Apps	Goals	Apps	Goals	Apps	Goals	Apps	Goals
Greece			League		Greek Cup		Europe		Total	
2004–05	Anagennisi Arta	Beta Ethniki	21	2	1	0	0	0	22	2
2005–06	PAOK	Alpha Ethniki	17	0	1	0	4	0	22	0
2006–07	PAOK	Super League Greece	23	2	4	0	0	0	27	2
2007–08	PAOK	Super League Greece	24	3	1	0	0	0	25	3
2008–09	PAOK	Super League Greece	23	0	3	0	0	0	26	0
2009–10	PAS Giannina	Super League Greece	11	0	0	0	0	0	11	0
2009–10	Ergotelis	Super League Greece	8	0	0	0	0	0	8	0
2010–11	PAOK	Super League Greece	6	0	1	0	1	0	8	0
2011–12	PAOK	Super League Greece	15	2	3	0	4	1	22	3
2012–13	FC Hoverla Uzhhorod	Ukrainian Premier League	21	2	2	1	0	0	23	3
2013–14	FC Hoverla Uzhhorod	Ukrainian Premier League	21	1	1	0	0	0	22	1
2014–15	Veria	Super League Greece	16	1	3	0	0	0	19	1
2015–16	Veria	Super League Greece	3	1	0	0	0	0	3	1
2016–17	Veria	Super League Greece	24	2	2	0	0	0	26	2
2017–18	Kerkyra	Super League Greece	8	0	1	0	0	0	9	0
Career total			240	18	23	1	9	1	271	18

Greece U21 national team
Year	Apps	Goals
2006	4	0
2007	5	1
2008	3	0
2009	1	0
Total	13	1

"Statistics accurate as of 5 January 2012"
