= Valeriy Kravchynskyi =

Soviet and Ukrainian footballer (1938–2001)

Personal information
- Full name: Valeriy Kyrylovych Kravchynskyi
- Date of birth: 12 December 1938
- Place of birth: Chernihiv, Soviet Union (now Ukraine)
- Date of death: 20 January 2001 (aged 62)
- Place of death: Chernihiv
- Position: Defender

Youth career
- Desna Chernihiv

Senior career*
Years	Team	Apps	(Gls)
1958	ATK Chernihiv		
?	Spartak Chernihiv		
1960–1961	Avanhard Chernihiv	31	(0)
1961–1971	Desna Chernihiv	364	(3)

Managerial career
- 1970: Desna Chernihiv
- * Club domestic league appearances and goals

Valeriy Kyrylovych Kravchynskyi (Ukrainian: Валерій Кирилович Кравчинський; 12 December 1938 – 20 January 2001) was a Soviet and Ukrainian football defender. He spent most of his career with Desna Chernihiv the main club in Chernihiv.

== Career ==
As a child, he played football on Leskovitsa, took part in the unofficial championships of Chernihiv among street teams. In 1953 he enrolled in the football section, whose coach was Alexander Norov. In 1958, he played for ATK Chernihiv and for Spartak Chernihiv, then he joyed to Avanhard Chernihiv where he played 31 matches.

=== Desna Chernihiv ===
In 1961, Avanhard Chernihiv changed their name to Desna Chernihiv and Kravchinsky was appointed vice captain and in 1964 as captain. In 1965, Desna reached the 1/8 finals of the Soviet Cup, defeating 6 opponents, including the A-class teams - Shinnik and Baku's Neftyanik. Kravchinsky took part in the 1/8 Cup final against Kairat, in which Desna lost 3: 4. He considered this game to be the best in his career and in the history of Desna. In 1967 he received the title of Master of Sports of the USSR. and also in the season 1965-66 In 1968, he played 41 games and in 1969 45 games and been the most successful seasons.

== After retirement ==
Finished his football career in 1970. In the fall of 1970, he was invited by Oleh Bazylevych to the position of coach of the Desna team's double, but he was at this job for about a month, since after the end of the season the team was disbanded. In 1971 he graduated from the Chernigov branch of the Kiev Polytechnic Institute and got a job at the Chernihiv Radio Instrument Plant. At this enterprise he worked as a designer, senior engineer and foreman of the precision mechanics workshop, held the positions of department head, head of the trade union committee and deputy chief engineer. Until the age of 39 he played in the factory football team "Promin". He was awarded the Order of the Badge of Honor. In the last years of his life he worked as an engineer in the research and production complex "Vector" (Exclusion Zone of the Chernobyl NPP). He died of cancer in early 2001 at the age of 62.

== Tributes ==
In 2021, in honor of the famous football player, the regional football federation has approved an annual tournament for the Valery Kravchinsky Cup among the pupils of CYSS.

== Honours ==
Desna Chernihiv

- Football Championship of Ukrainian SSR: 1968
- Football Championship of Ukrainian SSR: Runner-Up 1966

Preceded by Anatoliy Matyukhin	Captain of Desna Chernihiv; 1964–1970	Succeeded by Mikhail Chabaida
