= Oleksandr Sytnyk =

Ukrainian footballer

Personal information
- Full name: Oleksandr Borysovych Sytnyk
- Date of birth: 2 January 1985 (age 41)
- Place of birth: Vinnytsia, Soviet Union (now Ukraine)
- Height: 1.78 m (5 ft 10 in)
- Position: Midfielder

Youth career
- Dynamo Kyiv

Senior career*
| Years | Team | Apps | (Gls) |
| 2001–2008 | Dynamo Kyiv | 0 | (0) |
| 2001–2002 | → Borysfen-2 Boryspil (loan) | 21 | (3) |
| 2002–2008 | → Dynamo-2 Kyiv | 50 | (7) |
| 2002–2004 | → Dynamo-3 Kyiv | 43 | (2) |
| 2005 | → Arsenal Kyiv (loan) | 1 | (0) |
| 2006 | → Kharkiv (loan) | 13 | (0) |
| 2007 | → Karpaty Lviv (loan) | 3 | (0) |
| 2008 | Zvezda Irkutsk | 10 | (1) |
| 2008–2010 | lllichivets Mariupol | 16 | (1) |
| 2010–2011 | Zirka Kirovohrad | 11 | (2) |
| 2011–2013 | Hoverla Uzhhorod | 35 | (8) |
| 2014 | Bucha (amateurs) | | |
| 2014 | Dinaz Vyshhorod (amateurs) | | |
| 2015 | Lehiya Kyiv (amateurs) | 5 | (0) |
| 2018 | Muzychi (amateurs) | 7 | (0) |
| 2018 | Denhoff Denykhivka (amateurs) | | |
| 2019 | Juniors Shpytky (amateurs) | 1 | (0) |

International career
| 2000–2002 | Ukraine U17 | 11 | (1) |
| 2004 | Ukraine U19 | 10 | (1) |
| 2003–2006 | Ukraine U21 | 18 | (0) |

Managerial career
- 2018–2023: Shakhtar Donetsk U17
- 2024: Vorskla Poltava (assistant)
- 2025–: Ukraine U17
Medal record
Men's football
Representing Ukraine
UEFA European Under-19 Championship
| Bronze medal – third place | 2004 Switzerland |
UEFA European Under-21 Championship
| Runner-up | 2006 Portugal |
- * Club domestic league appearances and goals

Oleksandr Borysovych Sytnyk (born 2 January 1985) is a Ukrainian former professional football defender and current manager.

== See also ==
- 2005 FIFA World Youth Championship squads#Ukraine
