= Denys Prychynenko =

Footballer (born 1992)

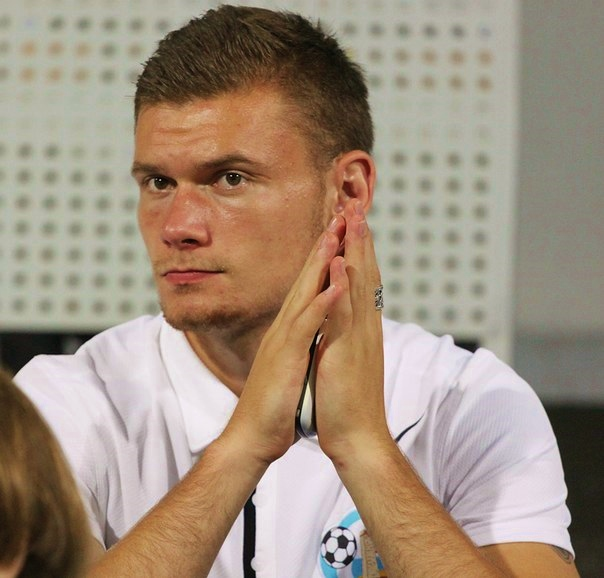
- Prychynenko in 2013

Personal information
- Full name: Denys Serhiyovych Prychynenko
- Date of birth: 17 February 1992 (age 34)
- Place of birth: Potsdam, Germany
- Height: 1.89 m (6 ft 2 in)
- Positions: Central midfielder; defender

Team information
- Current team: Wiltz 71
- Number: 13

Youth career
- 2007–2008: Energie Cottbus
- 2008–2009: Tennis Borussia Berlin
- 2009–2011: Heart of Midlothian

Senior career*
| Years | Team | Apps | (Gls) |
| 2011–2013 | Heart of Midlothian | 7 | (0) |
| 2011–2012 | → Raith Rovers (loan) | 5 | (1) |
| 2013–2014 | Sevastopol | 8 | (0) |
| 2014–2015 | CSKA Sofia | 11 | (0) |
| 2015–2016 | Union Berlin | 0 | (0) |
| 2016 | RWS Bruxelles | 6 | (0) |
| 2016–2021 | Beerschot | 137 | (7) |
| 2021–2024 | Deinze | 85 | (2) |
| 2024–2025 | Lokeren-Temse | 11 | (0) |
| 2025–2026 | Patro Eisden Maasmechelen | 20 | (1) |
| 2026– | Wiltz 71 | 5 | (0) |

International career^{‡}
| 2007–2008 | Ukraine U16 | 3 | (0) |
| 2009 | Ukraine U17 | 2 | (0) |
- * Club domestic league appearances and goals as of 16 September 2026 ‡ National team caps and goals as of 20 October 2013

Denys Serhiyovych Prychynenko (Ukrainian: Денис Сергійович Причиненко; born 17 February 1992) is a professional footballer who plays as a centre-back for Luxembourg National Division club Wiltz 71. Born in Germany, he represents Ukraine internationally.

== Youth career ==
Prychynenko was born on 17 February 1992 in Potsdam to a Ukrainian family. A pupil of the German football school.

Prychynenko played as an under-17 player for FC Energie Cottbus before joining Tennis Borussia Berlin in 2008. In 2009, he moved, joining Heart of Midlothian where he was a member of the successful under-19 squad who finished second behind Celtic during the 2010–11 Scottish Premier League under-19 season. He picked up the Hearts under 19 player of the season award and was their top scorer with 14 goals during season 2010–11.

== Club career ==
=== Heart of Midlothian ===
Prychynenko joined the Heart of Midlothian first team on 26 February 2011 being named as a substitute against Aberdeen and on one further occasion. Due to injury he failed to make his debut that season despite that his under 19 form earned him a new three-year contract extending his stay until 2014. In November 2011 he joined Raith Rovers on loan until January 2012 to gain first team experience. On return from Raith, Denys made his first team début for Hearts as a late substitute in a Scottish Premier League match; a 3–0 win over Aberdeen. He was an unused substitute as Hearts won the 2012 Scottish Cup final.

After making seven appearances for the club and having one more year left with the club, Prychyneko was released by the club, as Manager Gary Locke intended to reshape the squad.

=== Raith Rovers (loan) ===
On 3 November 2011, Prychynenko joined Scottish First Division side Raith Rovers on loan until 4 January 2012. Making his debut that weekend against Dundee at Dens Park. On 26 November, he was one of four on loan Jambos named in the starting line-up for the 3–2 victory over Hamilton Academical at Stark's Park. All three Raith goals were scored by on loan Hearts players as Prychynenko, Jason Holt and David Smith each netted their first professional goal. In all he made five appearances for the club, with his last appearance coming on 10 December against Livingston, due to requiring hernia surgery that limited his appearances. On 5 January 2012, Prychynenko's loan deal expired and he returned to Hearts.

=== Returning to Ukraine ===
After being released by Hearts, Prychychenko returned to Ukraine on 13 July 2013 by joining FC Sevastopol on a free transfer. In an interview with the Herald Scotland, he cited playing for Hearts as making him tougher player and talked about playing for a club in the Crimean war zone.

=== CSKA Sofia ===
On 17 July 2014, Prychynenko signed a one-year contract with the most successful club in Bulgaria, PFC CSKA Sofia. He made his debut 1 week after against Litex Lovech winning 1–0. After good performances in his first five games, Prychynenko signed a new three-year deal until 2017, on 2 September 2014.

=== Union Berlin ===
On 1 July 2015, Prychynenko signed a two-year contract with German 2. Bundesliga side 1. FC Union Berlin until 2017. He was released on 12 January 2016.

=== Royal White Star Brussels ===
End of February 2016, Prychynenko joined Belgian Second Division side Royal White Star Bruxelles, signing a contract until 2018 including an extension clause. He appeared in six games until the end of the season, achieving first place in the league with his team, which would usually lead to promotion to the Belgian first division. Bruxelles, however, didn't receive a license for professional football for the upcoming season and were relegated to the third tier.

=== Deinze ===
On 11 June 2021, he signed with Deinze as a free agent.

He left the club in December 2024 after Deinze was declared bankrupt and ceased operations.

=== Lokeren-Temse ===
On 19 December 2024, following Deinze's bankrupcty, newly promoted Challenger Pro League club Lokeren-Temse signed Prychynenko as a free agent.

=== Patro Eisden ===
On 25 June 2025, Prychynenko moved to Patro Eisden Maasmechelen.

== Personal life ==
Prychynenko was born in Potsdam, Germany, to Olena and Serhiy Prychynenko. His uncle Volodymyr Prychynenko and his cousin Stanislav Prychynenko (Volodymyr's son) are also professional footballers. Furthermore, Prychynenko holds a BA degree in business with marketing and is planning to start a law degree.

Prychynenko expressed the hope for a peaceful solution regarding the annexation of Crimea by the Russian Federation.

== Career statistics ==
As of match played 9 March 2025

Appearances and goals by club, season and competition
| Club | Season | League | | | National cup (Note: Includes Scottish Cup, Ukrainian Cup, Bulgarian Cup, DFB Pokal, Belgian Cup) | | League cup (Note: Includes Scottish League Cup) | | Continental | | Other | | Total | |
| Club | Season | Division | Apps | Goals | Apps | Goals | Apps | Goals | Apps | Goals | Apps | Goals | Apps | Goals |
|---|---|---|---|---|---|---|---|---|---|---|---|---|---|---|
| Heart of Midlothian | 2010-11 | Scottish Premier League | 0 | 0 | 0 | 0 | 0 | 0 | — | | — | | 0 | 0 |
| Heart of Midlothian | 2011-12 | Scottish Premier League | 3 | 0 | 1 | 0 | 0 | 0 | 0 | 0 | — | | 4 | 0 |
| Heart of Midlothian | 2012-13 | Scottish Premier League | 4 | 0 | 0 | 0 | 0 | 0 | 0 | 0 | — | | 4 | 0 |
| Heart of Midlothian | Total | | 7 | 0 | 1 | 0 | 0 | 0 | 0 | 0 | — | | 8 | 0 |
| Raith Rovers (loan) | 2011-12 | Scottish First Division | 5 | 1 | 0 | 0 | 0 | 0 | — | | 0 | 0 | 5 | 1 |
| Sevastopol | 2013-14 | Ukrainian Premier League | 8 | 0 | 0 | 0 | — | | — | | — | | 8 | 0 |
| CSKA Sofia | 2014-15 | Bulgarian A Group | 11 | 0 | 1 | 0 | — | | 0 | 0 | — | | 12 | 0 |
| Union Berlin | 2015-16 | 2. Bundesliga | 0 | 0 | 0 | 0 | — | | — | | — | | 0 | 0 |
| RWS Bruxelles | 2015-16 | Belgian Second Division | 6 | 0 | 0 | 0 | — | | — | | — | | 6 | 0 |
| Beerschot | 2016-17 | Belgian First Amateur Division | 14 | 0 | 0 | 0 | — | | — | | 6 (Note: Appearance(s) in Belgian First Amateur Division Promotion play-offs) | 0 | 20 | 0 |
| Beerschot | 2017-18 | Belgian First Division B | 23 | 1 | 1 | 0 | — | | — | | 12 (Note: Two appearances Belgian First Division B Promotion play-offs, Ten appearances and one goal in Belgian First Division A Europa League play-offs) | 1 | 36 | 2 |
| Beerschot | 2018-19 | Belgian First Division B | 26 | 2 | 2 | 0 | — | | — | | 11 (Note: Two appearances in Belgian First Division B Promotion play-offs, Nine appearances and one goal in Belgian First Division A Europa League play-offs) | 1 | 39 | 3 |
| Beerschot | 2019-20 | Belgian First Division B | 27 | 0 | 2 | 1 | — | | — | | 2 (Note: Appearance(s) in Belgian First Division B Promotion play-offs) | 0 | 31 | 1 |
| Beerschot | 2020-21 | Belgian First Division A | 16 | 1 | 1 | 0 | — | | — | | — | | 17 | 1 |
| Beerschot | Total | | 106 | 4 | 6 | 1 | — | | — | | 31 | 2 | 143 | 7 |
| Deinze | 2021-22 | Belgian First Division B | 25 | 1 | 2 | 1 | — | | — | | — | | 27 | 2 |
| Deinze | 2022-23 | Challenger Pro League | 26 | 1 | 2 | 0 | — | | — | | — | | 28 | 1 |
| Deinze | 2023-24 | Challenger Pro League | 22 | 0 | 1 | 0 | — | | — | | 2 (Note: Appearance(s) in Belgian Pro League Promotion/Relegation play-offs) | 0 | 25 | 0 |
| Deinze | 2024-25 | Challenger Pro League | 10 | 0 | 2 | 0 | — | | — | | — | | 12 | 0 |
| Deinze | Total | | 83 | 2 | 7 | 1 | — | | — | | 2 | 0 | 92 | 3 |
| Lokeren-Temse | 2024-25 | Challenger Pro League | 8 | 0 | 0 | 0 | — | | — | | — | | 8 | 0 |
| Career total | | | 234 | 7 | 15 | 2 | 0 | 0 | 0 | 0 | 33 | 2 | 282 | 11 |

== Honours ==
Heart of Midlothian

- Scottish Cup: 2011–12
