= Andriy Hrinchenko =

Ukrainian footballer

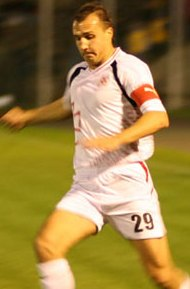

Personal information
- Full name: Andriy Hrinchenko
- Date of birth: 23 January 1986 (age 40)
- Place of birth: Ternopil, Soviet Union
- Height: 1.81 m (5 ft 11 in)
- Position: Defender

Youth career
- 1999–2000: DYuSSh Ternopil
- 2000–2001: Shakhtar Donetsk
- 2002–2003: Volyn Lutsk

Senior career*
Years	Team	Apps	(Gls)
2003	Kovel-Volyn-2 Kovel	5	(0)
2003–2008	Nyva Ternopil	110	(3)
2008–2009	Zorya Luhansk	25	(0)
2010–2012	Volyn Lutsk	28	(0)
2012–2013	Hoverla Uzhhorod	11	(0)
2014	Nyva Ternopil	26	(0)
2016	FC Nyva Terebovlya		
2016–2018	FC DSO-Podillya Ternopil Raion		
2019	Krystal Chortkiv		
2021	FC Plotycha		
- * Club domestic league appearances and goals

Andriy Hrinchenko (Ukrainian: Андрій Гринченко; born 23 January 1986) is a Ukrainian former professional football defender.
