= Levan Gulordava =

Georgian footballer

Personal information
- Full name: Levan Gulordava
- Date of birth: 16 May 1988 (age 38)
- Place of birth: Zugdidi, Georgia
- Height: 1.92 m (6 ft 3 1/2 in)
- Position: Forward

Youth career
- 2004: Arsenal Kyiv
- 2004–2005: Dnipro

Senior career*
| Years | Team | Apps | (Gls) |
| 2005–2007 | Arsenal Kyiv | 0 | (0) |
| 2008 | Industriya Dnipro (amateur) | 9 | (6) |
| 2010–2011 | Desna Chernihiv | 13 | (4) |
| 2011–2012 | Oleksandriya | 0 | (0) |
| 2011–2012 | Zirka Kropyvnytskyi | 6 | (1) |
| 2012–2013 | Arsenal Kyiv | 0 | (0) |
| 2013–2014 | Desna Chernihiv | 8 | (0) |
| 2014–2015 | Zugdidi | 8 | (0) |

Managerial career
- 2016–: Zugdidi
- * Club domestic league appearances and goals as of 22 November 2021

Levan Gulordava (Georgian: ლევან გულორდავა; born 16 June 1988) is a professional Georgian football midfielder.

== Club career ==
Gulordava is a product of Dnipro and Arsenal Kyiv. He made his debut as professional football player in 2005 with Arsenal Kyiv. In 2008 he moved to Industriya Dnipro, where he played 9 matches and scored 6 goals. In 2010 he moved Desna Chernihiv the main club of the city of Chernihiv, here he played 13 games and scored 4 goals in Ukrainian Second League. In 2011 he moved Oleksandriya and then in Zirka Kropyvnytskyi, where he played 6 matches and scored 1 goal. He returned to Arsenal Kyiv without playing and he returned to Desna Chernihiv, where he played 8 games and finally he returned to Zugdidi in Georgia.

== Managerial career ==
In 2016 he was appointed as coach of Zugdidi.
