= Mirko Raičević =

Montenegrin footballer

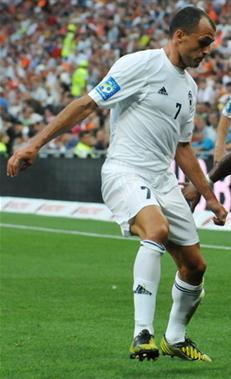
- Raičević in 2013.

Personal information
- Full name: Mirko Raičević
- Date of birth: 22 March 1982 (age 44)
- Place of birth: Titograd, SFR Yugoslavia
- Height: 1.78 m (5 ft 10 in)
- Position: Defensive midfielder

Youth career
- Mladost Podgorica

Senior career*
Years	Team	Apps	(Gls)
2001–2003	Obilić		
2001–2002	→ Mladi Obilić (loan)	28	(1)
2003	→ Žitorađa (loan)	15	(2)
2003–2008	Budućnost Podgorica	152	(11)
2008–2009	Zorya Luhansk	29	(2)
2009–2010	Chornomorets Odesa	18	(1)
2010–2015	Hoverla Uzhhorod	109	(8)
2015–2021	OFK Titograd	124	(9)

International career^{‡}
2007	Montenegro	3	(0)
- * Club domestic league appearances and goals as of 9 October 2020 ‡ National team caps and goals as of 18 July 2017

Mirko Raičević (Cyrillic: Mиpкo Paичeвић, born 22 March 1982), also known by his nickname Ćiro, is a Montenegrin footballer who finished his career at OFK Titograd.

== International career ==
He made his debut for Montenegro in his country's first ever competitive match on 24 March 2007, a friendly against Hungary in Podgorica. He also played in the Kirin Cup, in June 2007 and earned a total of 3 caps, scoring no goals.

== Honours ==
Budućnost

- Montenegrin First League: 2007–08
