= Vladimir Martynov (footballer) =

Kazakh footballer and manager

Personal information
- Full name: Vladimir Vladimirovich Martynov
- Date of birth: 6 April 1976 (age 50)
- Place of birth: Temirtau, Kazakh SSR
- Height: 1.88 m (6 ft 2 in)
- Positions: Defender; forward

Youth career
- –1993: SC Tavriya Simferopol

Senior career*
Years	Team	Apps	(Gls)
1993–1997	SC Tavriya Simferopol	25	(1)
1996–1997	→ FC Dynamo Saky (loan)	19	(1)
1997	FC Tytan Armyansk	4	(0)
1998	FC Kharchovyk Simferopol		
1998	FC Slavutych	7	(4)
1998	→ FC Desna Chernihiv (loan)	1	(0)
1998	FC Desna Chernihiv	8	(3)
1999	FC Prykarpattya Ivano-Frankivsk	12	(1)
1999	→ FC Enerhetyk Burshtyn (loan)	1	(0)
2000	FC Vinnytsia	11	(3)
2000	FC Polissya Zhytomyr	15	(4)
2001	FC Metalurh Donetsk	5	(0)
2001	→ FC Metalurh-2 Donetsk	14	(1)
2002	FC Polissya Zhytomyr	30	(4)
2003	FC Zakarpattia Uzhhorod	7	(0)
2003–2005	FC Zorya Luhansk	48	(5)
2005	FC Krymteplytsia Molodizhne	16	(3)
2006–2009	FC Ihroservice Simferopol	101	(8)
2009	FC Syhma Kherson		
2010	FC Myr Hornostayivka		
2010	FC Hvardiyets Hvardiyske		
2010–2012	FC YuIS-Service Simferopol		
2012–2013	FC ITV Simferopol		
2013–2014	FC YuIS-Service Simferopol		

Managerial career
- –2014: SC Tavriya Simferopol (academy)
- 2014–2019: FC TSK Simferopol
- * Club domestic league appearances and goals as of 28 September 2021

Vladimir Vladimirovich Martynov (Russian: Владимир Владимирович Мартынов); or Volodymyr Volodymyrovich Martynov (Ukrainian: Володимир Володимирович Мартинов; born 6 April 1976) is a Ukrainian (until 2014), Russian football manager and a former player.
