= Stanislav Prychynenko =

Ukrainian-Russian footballer

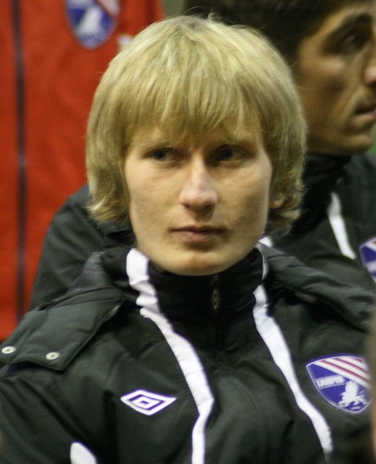

Personal information
- Full name: Stanislav Volodymyrovych Prychynenko
- Date of birth: 26 June 1991 (age 35)
- Place of birth: Simferopol, Ukrainian SSR
- Height: 1.82 m (6 ft 0 in)
- Position: Midfielder

Youth career
- 2002–2003: Tavriya Simferopol
- 2003–2008: Shakhtar Donetsk

Senior career*
Years	Team	Apps	(Gls)
2008–2011	Shakhtar Donetsk	0	(0)
2008–2010	→ Shakhtar-3 Donetsk	52	(9)
2011–2014	Tavriya Simferopol	31	(2)
2014–2017	Tosno	57	(0)
2017	→ Baltika Kaliningrad (loan)	11	(0)
2017	Baltika Kaliningrad	2	(0)
2018	Kolkheti-1913 Poti	10	(0)
2019–2020	Baltika Kaliningrad	21	(0)
2021	Akron Tolyatti	2	(0)

International career
2006–2007	Ukraine U-16	11	(3)
2006–2008	Ukraine U-17	14	(1)
2008	Ukraine U-18	1	(0)
2011	Ukraine U-21	1	(0)
- * Club domestic league appearances and goals

Stanislav Prychynenko (Ukrainian: Станіслав Володимирович Причиненко, born 26 June 1991) is a Ukrainian former football defender. He also holds Russian citizenship as Stanislav Vladimirovich Prichinenko (Russian: Станислав Владимирович Причиненко).

== Club career ==
Prychynenko began his playing career with SC Tavriya Simferopol's youth team. Then he spent some years in FC Shakhtar Donetsk football system. In February 2011 he signed two years deal with SC Tavriya.

Following a 6-month loan from FC Tosno, on 8 June 2017 he signed a 2-year contract with FC Baltika Kaliningrad.

== International career ==
He played some matches for Ukraine national youth football teams of different ages.

== Personal ==
His father Volodymyr Prychynenko, his uncle Serhiy Prychynenko and cousin Denis Prychynenko (Serhiy's son) all played football professionally.
