= Vadym Kyrylov =

Moldovan football striker (born 1981)

Personal information
- Full name: Vadym Kyrylov
- Date of birth: 2 June 1981 (age 45)
- Place of birth: Zoria, Bilhorod-Dnistrovskyi Raion, Ukrainian SSR
- Height: 1.87 m (6 ft 2 in)
- Position: Forward

Senior career*
Years	Team	Apps	(Gls)
1997–2002	Tiligul Tiraspol	86	(22)
2002	Karpaty Lviv	0	(0)
2002	→ Karpaty-2 Lviv	12	(2)
2003	Zakarpattia Uzhhorod	17	(0)
2004	Zirka Kirovohrad	11	(2)
2004–2005	Metalurh Zaporizhya	2	(0)
2005–2006	Zorya Luhansk	39	(16)
2007	Desna Chernihiv	2	(0)
2007	Nyva Ternopil	13	(6)
2008	Naftovyk Okhtyrka	13	(0)
2009	PFC Oleksandria	20	(5)
2010	Stal Dniprodzerzhynsk	7	(2)
2011–2015	Balkany Zoria	45	(7)
- * Club domestic league appearances and goals as of 20 February 2011

Vadym Kyrylov (born 2 June 1981) is a Moldovan football forward who played for Naftovyk in the Ukrainian Premier League.
