= Volodymyr Polishchuk =

Ukrainian football player

Personal information
- Full name: Volodymyr Vasylyovych Polishchuk
- Date of birth: 29 October 1974 (age 52)
- Place of birth: Kyiv, Ukraine SSR, USSR
- Height: 1.84 m (6 ft 1/2 in)
- Position: Midfielder

Senior career*
Years	Team	Apps	(Gls)
1993–1996	Dynamo Kyiv	0	(0)
1993–1996	→ Dynamo-2 Kyiv	64	(4)
1994–1995	→ Dynamo-3 Kyiv	10	(0)
1997	CSKA Kyiv	27	(2)
1997	→ CSKA-2 Kyiv	2	(0)
1998	Metalurh Mariupol	24	(1)
1999	Metalurh Zaporizhzhia	0	(0)
1999	→ Metalurh-2 Zaporizhzhia	6	(0)
1999	Chornomorets Odesa	4	(0)
2000	Tavriya Simferopol	12	(3)
2000–2002	CSKA / Arsenal Kyiv	37	(0)
2000–2002	→ CSKA-2 Kyiv	14	(0)
2002–2004	Illichivets Mariupol	34	(3)
2004	→ Illichivets-2 Mariupol	1	(0)
2004–2005	Vorskla Poltava	3	(0)
2005	Borysfen Boryspil	4	(0)
2006	Desna Chernihiv	28	(0)
2007	Knyazha Shchaslyve	7	(1)
- * Club domestic league appearances and goals

Volodymyr Vasylyovych Polishchuk (Ukrainian: Володимир Васильович Поліщук; born 29 October 1974) is a Ukrainian retired professional footballer.

== Career ==
Volodymyr Polishchuk was born on 29 July 1974 in Kyiv. Vikhovanets SDYUSSHOR Dynamo Kyiv. At the wlub, he received a professional car, having signed a contract with the club (1993 rik). Protest for the head team of the capital's dynamists did not get to play the official official match. Natomist played in the capital Dynamo-2 Kyiv. He made his debut for a friend match, 15 September 1993 ended (1: 1). In the 1st round of the Ukrainian First League against Prykarpattia Ivano-Frankivsk. Volodymyr entered at the 60th minute replaced Serhiy Baranovskiy, and on the 81st grade, he scored, which allowed to get one point in the whole match. With Dynamo-2 Kyiv, he played until 1996, playing 42 matches, which was distinguished by 2 goals, more than 3 matches won at the Ukrainian Cup. From 1993 to 1995 he played for the amateur club Dynamo-3 Kyiv at that hour, having played 9 matches.

In 1997, they moved to CSKA Kyiv, where debut at the last round of Ukrainian Premier League. Polishchuk played in the match against Nyva Ternopil ended 0-0. And decilcom days earlier, 6 Bereznya, Volodymyr was marked by his debut goal against the football team from Kyiv, on the 71st medley of the program (0: 1), the visibility of 1/2 of the Ukrainian Cup final against Shakhtar Donetsk entering at the 56th minute, replacing Vitaly Levchenko. Vyschiy Lizi of Ukraine was marked by the debut goal of 23rd of 1997 in the new (2: 2) vicious match of the 30th round against Dynamo Kyiv. Polіshchuk at that vyshov matches on the field in the starting in the line-uip, and on the 75th mininutes he replaced Mikhaylo Stelmakh. By stretching his transfer of the capital's armies, he won 27 matches and won 2 goals, and 2 more matches (1 goal) won the Ukrainian Cup.

=== Mariupol, Zaporizhzhia, Odesa and Simferopol ===
In 1998, he moved to the Metalurh Zaporizhzhia and he made his debut on 11 March 1998 ended (0: 3) in the match of the 1/8 final of the Ukrainian Cup. against the capital's Dynamo Kyiv. Volodymyr Polishchuk on the field at the starting in the fields and played the whole match. At the national championship, he made his debut for the Mariupolsk club in a nichi (1: 1) home match of the 16th round of the last league to the Ukrainian championship against Kryvbas Kryvorizkiy. Polishchuk Polishchuk was included in the line-up and played all match. One goal from the Metalurh Zaporizhzhia football team was awarded on 28 April 1998 to the rock on the 38th mediocre (2: 0) home match of the 22nd round of the big league to the Ukrainian championship against Chornomorets Odesa. Stretching his own move to Mariupol at the Ukrainian Championship won 24 matches and scored 1 goal, 2 more matches for the Mariupol won the Ukrainian Cup.

1999 rocketed to Metalurh Zaporizhzhia. As a matter of fact, as in the situation with Dynamo Kyiv, the club did not win a good match for the head team. Natomist having entered the other farm-club of Zaporozhtsy, "Metallurz-2". Debuting the team of metallurgists for a friend on April 4, 1999, in a new (1: 1) tour of the 16th round of the group In another league, the championship of Ukraine against the Zorya Luhansk . Volodymyr was included in the roster of the match and played all the matches. Having won 6 matches with the Metallurg-2 football player, having defeated the team.

In 1999 rotsi came to Chornomorets Odesa. He made his debut for the Odesa club on the 1st Serpnya in 1999 against the victorious (0: 5) vicious match of the 5th round of the big league championship of Ukraine against the Karpaty Lviv. Having played 3 more matches in the football "sailors", Volodymyr has played the role of the club.

In another part of the 1999/00 season, the rock was captured by the colors of the Simferopol "Tavria". For a new team, he made his debut in 25 Bereznya 2000 rock in the progressed (2: 4) visitor match of the 17th round of the last league to the Ukrainian championship against Kryvbas. Volodymyr Polishchuk at the starting on the bench and at the 48 minutes, replacing Andriy Oparin.

The first goal for the Simferopol team was awarded on April 8, 2000, to the 18th grade of the program (1: 3) home match of the 19th round of the great league to the Ukrainian championship against Dynamo Kyiv. Polishchuk viyshov on the field at the starting at the bench. The football player "Tavria" has won 12 matches, with 3 goals.

=== Turning to Kyiv and Mariupol ===
In the season 2000-2001 he moved to the CSKA Kyiv. Re-debuting with the Kyiv team, where he made his debut on 12 April 2000 in the match of the 1st round of the Ukrainian Premier League against the Stal Alchevsk. One goal from CSKA football meant 2 leaf fall in 2011 on the 43rd medley of a peremogy (4: 1) visitor to the 1/4 final of the Ukrainian Cup. Polishchuk viyshov on the field in the starting at the line up and played the whole match.

In the 2002 rock, a person from the Kyiv city's head Oleksandr Omelchenko and the president of CSKA Oleksandr Danilchuk was brought up about the appearance of Arsenal Kyiv. Otozh, repairing from another stake for the 2001/02 season, Volodymyr Polishchuk joined the Arsenal Kyiv in Kyiv. The new old club has a debut on 25 March 2002 in a new (0: 0) home match of the 15th round of the big league championship of Ukraine against the Simferopol "Tavria". Volodymyr viyshov on the field on the 70th Khvilini, replacing Oleksiy Osipov. Stretching his way to CSKA Kyiv in the Ukrainian Premier League, where he played 39 matches, the he played 3 matches and scored 1 goal and won the Ukrainian Cup.

In 2002, he moved to Metalurg Mariupol, where he made his debut on 13 April 2002 in the 2nd round of the Ukrainian Premier League to against the Obolon Kyiv. The first goal for metallurgists, for his own turn, was the 6th of 2002 rock on the 59th of the program (2: 2) home match of the 12th round of the all-round league championship of Ukraine against Shakhtar Donetsk. Polіshchuk at that matches started in the bench, and in the 87th minute replaced Ruslan Miklashevich. By extending his transfer to Metalurz, he won 34 matches against Vishіy lіzі and won 4 goals, more 2 matches were won in the Ukrainian Cup. 23 May 2004 rooku won a single match in the football team of Mariupol Metallurg-2 (26th round, group In another league championship of Ukraine) against Zaporizhzhia teammates, which ended with a win.

=== Vorskla and Borisfen ===
I am part of the 2004/05 season at the Vorskla Poltava. For the Poltava club, on 15 April 2004, he made his debut at home in the first match of the Ukrainian Premier League against Arsenal Kyiv ended 3:0. Volodymyr made his debut at the 45th minute where he replaced Volodymyr Brail. Played more than 2 matches in the Ukrainian Premier League, as well as 1 matches in the Ukrainian Cup.

For another part of the 2004/05 season, there was rocky provin at Borispil's Borysphenia in the first Ukrainian championship. He made his debut for the Borispil team on 10 spring 2005 in a rocky (0: 0) home match against Bershad. Polishchuk viyshov on the field in the starting match, and on the 86th grade, replacing Andriy Zaporozhan. In 2005 he moved to Borysfen Boryspil, but Volodymyr didn't tread much but only 4 matches.

=== Desna and Knyazha ===
In January 2006, he moved to Desna Chernihiv, the main club in Chernihiv, where he made his debut on April 8, 2006, in the cross-country (2: 0) visibility match of the 18th round of the group A of another league to the Ukrainian championship against the "Knyazhoi". Together with the team, he became the winner of the group A of Ukrainian Second League, and he got promoted to the Ukrainian First League. stretching out his own transfer to Chernigov won 29 matches in the championships of Ukraine and 1 - in the Ukrainian Cup. In January 2007, he moved to the club Knyazha Shchaslyve in Ukrainian Second League where he made his debut on 16 April 2007 in the 0:0 match of the 20th round of the group A in the 64th minute, replacing Igor Krajivskyi.

=== Completed career ===
By the end of the 2006/07 season, the rock was pinned at the professional level. From 2008 to 2010, the rock was played at the amateur club Zirka Kropyvnytskyi.

== Honours ==
Desna Chernihiv

- Ukrainian Second League: 2005–06
