= Volodymyr Prychynenko =

Ukrainian footballer (born 1960)

Personal information
- Full name: Volodymyr Oleksiyovych Prychynenko
- Date of birth: 2 April 1960 (age 66)
- Place of birth: Pryluky, Ukrainian SSR
- Height: 1.78 m (5 ft 10 in)
- Positions: Defender; midfielder

Team information
- Current team: Tavriya Simferopol (assistant coach)

Senior career*
Years	Team	Apps	(Gls)
1980–1981	Tavriya Simferopol	33	(1)
1982–1983	SKA Kyiv		
1983	Dnipro Cherkasy	34	(0)
1984–1985	Tavriya Simferopol	68	(3)
1986–1988	Desna Chernihiv	87	(0)
1989–1991	Nyva Vinnytsia	102	(1)
1992	FSV Velten	15	(0)
1992–1994	SV Falkensee-Finkenkrug		
1994	Temp Shepetivka	4	(0)
1995–1998	SV Falkensee-Finkenkrug		

Managerial career
- 1998–1999: Tavriya Simferopol (assistant)
- 2004: Tavriya-2 Simferopol (assistant)
- 2006–2008: Tavriya Simferopol (assistant)
- 2009: Tavriya Simferopol (reserves)
- 2011: FC ITV Simferopol
- 2015–: Tavriya Simferopol (assistant)
- * Club domestic league appearances and goals

Volodymyr Oleksiyovych Prychynenko (Ukrainian: Володимир Олексійович Причиненко; born 2 April 1960) is a Ukrainian football coach and former player. He works as an assistant coach with Tavriya Simferopol.

His twin brother Serhiy Prychynenko, his son Stanislav Prychynenko and his nephew Denis Prychynenko (Serhiy's son) are all professional footballers.
