= Ihor Myhalatiuk =

Ukrainian footballer

Personal information
- Full name: Мигалатюк Игорь Владимирович
- Date of birth: 26 July 1976 (age 50)
- Place of birth: Ukrainian SSR, USSR
- Height: 1.84 m (6 ft 0 in)
- Position: Midfielder

Senior career*
Years	Team	Apps	(Gls)
1993–1995	Bukovyna Chernivtsi	31	(1)
1995–1996	Halychyna Drohobych	1	(0)
1996–1997	Bukovyna Chernivtsi	8	(0)
1996–1997	Bălți	12	(1)
1997–2001	Bukovyna Chernivtsi	118	(6)
2001–2002	Chornomorets Odesa	31	(1)
2001–2002	Chornomorets-2 Odesa	2	(0)
2002–2003	Chornomorets Odesa	8	(1)
2002–2003	Nyva Vinnytsia	13	(0)
2003–2004	Spartak Ivano-Frankivsk	15	(1)
2003–2004	Bukovyna Chernivtsi	13	(1)
2004–2006	Spartak Ivano-Frankivsk	56	(4)
2006–2007	Enerhetyk Burshtyn	14	(1)
2006–2007	Desna Chernihiv	9	(1)
2007–2009	Enerhetyk Burshtyn	46	(3)
2009–2010	Bukovyna Chernivtsi	18	(2)
- * Club domestic league appearances and goals as of 16 December 2021

Ihor Myhalatiuk (Ukrainian: Мигалатюк Игорь Владимирович) is a Ukrainian retired footballer. Known for his performances for Bukovyna Chernivtsi and Chornomorets Odesa. He also spent most of his career at Enerhetyk Burshtyn and Enerhetyk Burshtyn. He has played over 400 official matches with Ukrainian teams during the years of independence.

== Career ==
Igor Migalatyuk is a graduate of the Chernivtsi Sports School Bukovyna Chernivtsi, his professional career began in 1994 in his native Bukovyna Chernivtsi. He made his debut in the Premier League of Ukraine on June 19 of the same year in a match against Ternopil Niva. In 1996, he joined the Moldovan Olympia. At the end of the season Igor returned to Bukovyna Chernivtsi, where he lost until the summer of 2001.

In connection with the unsuccessful 2000/01 season, in which Bukovyna Chernivtsi took the last place in the first league, Migalatyuk, like a number of other players, left his native club and immediately received an invitation to Odesa in Chornomorets Odesa, with which he won silver first league awards and registration for the next season in the major league of Ukraine. He also played in clubs: Nyva Vinnytsia, Spartak Ivano-Frankivsk. In winter 2007, he moved to Desna Chernihiv, the main club of Chernihiv. In summer 2007, he moved to Enerhetyk Burshtyn, where he played more than 150 matches in the first league of Ukraine. In summer 2009, he returned to his native team, where he played one season and ended his playing career. In total, he played over 200 matches for Bukovina (189 - the championship, 13 - the Cup).

== After retirement ==
Since 2015, he has been working on the Chernivtsi TV channel as a commentator for Bukovyna Chernivtsi's home matches.

== Personal life ==
He is married and has two daughters.

== Honours ==
Chornomorets Odesa

- Ukrainian Second League: 2009–10

Chornomorets Odesa

- Ukrainian First League: 2001–02

Bukovyna Chernivtsi

- Ukrainian Second League: 1999–2000
