= Dmytro Trukhin =

Ukrainian footballer

Personal information
- Full name: Dmytro Trukhin
- Date of birth: 29 June 1983 (age 43)
- Place of birth: Lutsk, Ukrainian SSR
- Height: 1.73 m (5 ft 8 in)
- Position: Midfielder

Senior career*
Years	Team	Apps	(Gls)
2000–2001	Lviv	5	(0)
2001–2002	Sokil Zolochiv	35	(1)
2002	→ Desna Chernihiv (loan)	1	(0)
2003–2005	Hazovyk-Skala Stryi	68	(3)
2006–2007	Krymteplytsia Molodizhne	35	(2)
2007–2008	Stal Alchevsk	54	(3)
2009–2011	Krymteplytsia Molodizhne	68	(9)
2011–2015	Hoverla Uzhhorod	98	(13)
- * Club domestic league appearances and goals as of 28 November 2021

Dmytro Trukhin (born 29 June 1983) is a Ukrainian professional footballer who played as a midfielder .
