= Oleksandr Polunytskyi =

Soviet footballer and Ukrainian coach

Personal information
- Full name: Олександр Віталійович Полуницький
- Date of birth: 16 January 1985 (age 41)
- Place of birth: Poltava, Ukrainian SSR, USSR
- Height: 1.84 m (6 ft 0 in)
- Position: Defender

Senior career*
Years	Team	Apps	(Gls)
2001–2002	Borysfen-2 Boryspil	19	(1)
2002–2003	Dynamo-3 Kyiv	34	(1)
2004–2006	Vorskla Poltava	5	(0)
2004–2005	→ Vorskla-2 Poltava	11	(1)
2006–2007	Desna Chernihiv	10	(0)
2007–2008	Stal Alchevsk	24	(2)
2008–2009	Stal Dniprodzerzhynsk	30	(5)
2009	Mykolaiv	12	(0)
2010	Stal Dniprodzerzhynsk	23	(1)
2011–2012	Poltava	25	(5)
2013	Karlivka	10	(0)
2013	Slavutich Cherkasy	9	(1)

International career
2000–2002	Ukraine U17	10	(1)
2003–2004	Ukraine U19	19	(0)
- * Club domestic league appearances and goals as of 14 December 2021

Oleksandr Vitaliyovych Polunytskyi (Ukrainian: Олександр Віталійович Полуницький) is a Ukrainian retired football player.

== Career ==
Pupil of the Children's and Youth Sports School named after Gorpinko (Poltava). The first coach was Karmalik V. N.. At the age of 15, he got into the academic class of Pavel Yakovenko, passed all his steps: Dynamo (Obukhov), Borysfen-2 Boryspil, Dynamo-3 Kyiv, youth teams of Ukraine. In the spring of 2004 he returned to his hometown to Vorskla Poltava. He made his debut in the vysheligovoy team on May 22, 2004 in the game against Chornomorets Odesa (0: 2). In total, he played 5 matches in the Ukrainian Premier League. Since 2006, he played in the Ukrainian First League, playing in the teams Desna Chernihiv, Stal Alchevsk, Stal Kamianske, Mykolaiv, Poltava, Poltava-2 Karlivka. In September 2013 he became a player of Cherkasy Slavutich.

== National team ==
In 2002, as part of the youth national team of Ukraine under (17 years old) took part in the matches of the European Championship. In 2004 he was called up to the youth team (under 19 years old) to prepare for the European Championship. It was not included in the official application for the championship. He played 18 matches for the youth national team of Ukraine, scored 1 goal. For the junior national team of Ukraine played 19 matches.
