= Maksym Stankevych =

Ukrainian footballer

Personal information
- Full name: Станкевич Максим Олегович
- Date of birth: 16 August 1975 (age 51)
- Place of birth: Ukrainian SSR, USSR
- Height: 1.84 m (6 ft 0 in)
- Position: Defender

Senior career*
Years	Team	Apps	(Gls)
2001	Borysfen-2 Boryspil	12	(0)
2001–2002	Borysfen Boryspil	1	(0)
2001–2003	Borysfen-2 Boryspil	32	(0)
2003–2004	Systema-Boreks Borodianka	15	(0)
2003–2004	Borysfen-2 Boryspil	14	(0)
2004–2007	Borysfen Boryspil	46	(0)
2006–2007	Desna Chernihiv	12	(0)
2007–2008	Knyazha Shchaslyve	1	(0)
- * Club domestic league appearances and goals as of 16 December 2021

Maksym Stankevych (Ukrainian: Станкевич Максим Олегович) is a Ukrainian retired footballer.

== Career ==
Anatoliy Verteletsky started his career at Borysfen-2 Boryspil and Borysfen Boryspil. In 2003 he moved Systema-Boreks Borodianka while continuing for Borysfen-2 Boryspil. In summer 2004 he returned to Borysfen Boryspil where he played 46 matches and in January 2007 he moved to Desna Chernihiv the main club of Chernihiv. In summer 2007 he moved to Knyazha Shchaslyve.
