= Serhiy Cherniy =

Ukrainian footballer

Personal information
- Date of birth: 9 April 1984 (age 42)
- Place of birth: Kyiv, Ukrainian SSR, USSR
- Height: 1.84 m (6 ft 1/2 in)
- Position: Defender

Senior career*
Years	Team	Apps	(Gls)
2000–2002	Dynamo Kyiv	0	(0)
2000–2002	→ Dynamo-3 Kyiv	24	(0)
2001	→ Dynamo-2 Kyiv	0	(0)
2002–2006	Borysfen Boryspil	63	(0)
2003	→ Borysfen-2 Boryspil	27	(1)
2004	→ Boreks-Borysfen Borodianka	13	(0)
2007	Desna Chernihiv	13	(0)
2008	Stal-2 Alchevsk	1	(0)
- * Club domestic league appearances and goals

Serhiy Cherniy (Ukrainian: Сергій Олександрович Черній) is a Ukrainian retired footballer.

== Career ==
Serhiy Cherniy started his career in 2000 with Dynamo-3 Kyiv, where he played 24 matches, staying with the club until 2002. In summer 2002, he played 13 matches with Borysfen-2 Boryspil. In the season 2003–2004, he moved to Borysfen Boryspil, where he played 13 matches. In 2003 he played 14 matches and scored 1 goal with Borysfen-2 Boryspil. In 2004 until 2006, he played 61 matches with Borysfen Boryspil. In summer 2006 he moved to Desna Chernihiv, the main club of the city of Chernihiv, where he played 13 games. In the winter transfer he returned to Borysfen Boryspil where he played 17 matches and in 2008 he played 1 match with Stal-2 Alchevsk.
