= Mykhaylo Chabayda =

Soviet footballer

Personal information
- Full name: Mykhaylo Prokopovych Chabayda
- Date of birth: 10 August 1948
- Place of birth: Chernihiv, Ukrainian SSR, Soviet Union
- Date of death: 4 August 1995 (aged 46)
- Place of death: Chernihiv, Ukraine
- Position: Defender

Senior career*
Years	Team	Apps	(Gls)
1968–1970	Desna Chernihiv	92	(2)
1971–1975	SKA Kyiv/SK Chernihiv	0	(0)
1976	Khimik Chernihiv		
1977–1978	Desna Chernihiv	79	(0)
- * Club domestic league appearances and goals

Mykhaylo Prokopovych Chabayda (Ukrainian: Михайло Прокопович Чабайда; 10 August 1948 – 4 August 1995) was a Soviet and Ukrainian football defender.

== Career ==
Mykhaylo Chabayda started his career with Desna Chernihiv in 1968 until 1970 where he played 92 matches and scoring 2 goals. With the movement of CSKA Kyiv to the city of Chernihiv, Mykhaylo become the captain of the club. In 1972 he played for Arsenal Kyiv here played 12 matches and scoring 1 goal. In 1973 the club changed the name to SK Chernihiv and here he played until 1975. In 1976 he played for Khimik Chernihiv, then in 1977 until 1978 he played again for Desna Chernihiv, where he played 79 matches.
