= Serhiy Prychynenko =

Ukrainian footballer

Personal information
- Full name: Serhiy Oleksiyovych Prychynenko
- Date of birth: 2 April 1960 (age 66)
- Place of birth: Pryluky, Ukrainian SSR
- Height: 1.78 m (5 ft 10 in)
- Position: Midfielder

Senior career*
Years	Team	Apps	(Gls)
1979–1980	Desna Chernihiv	33	(1)
1980–1983	Tavriya Simferopol	103	(6)
1984	CSKA Moscow	18	(1)
1985–1989	Tavriya Simferopol	181	(14)
1990–2002	Falkensee-Finkenkrug		
- * Club domestic league appearances and goals

Serhiy Oleksiyovych Prychynenko (Ukrainian: Сергій Олексійович Причиненко; born 2 April 1960) is a former Ukrainian football player.

== Personal life ==
His son Denys Prychynenko, his twin brother Volodymyr Prychynenko and nephew Stanislav Prychynenko (Volodymyr's son) were all professional footballers.
