= Vadym Antipov =

Ukrainian football striker

Personal information
- Full name: Vadym Petrovych Antipov
- Date of birth: 11 September 1988 (age 38)
- Place of birth: Ukrainian SSR, Soviet Union
- Height: 1.73 m (5 ft 8 in)
- Position: Forward

Youth career
- 2001–2004: UFK Dnipropetrovsk
- 2004: FC Kryvbas Kryvyi Rih
- 2004–2005: UFK Dnipropetrovsk
- 2006: FC Obriy Nikopol

Senior career*
Years	Team	Apps	(Gls)
2006–2007	FC Desna Chernihiv	26	(1)
2007–2008	FC Naftovyk-Ukrnafta Okhtyrka	13	(1)
2009	FC Feniks-Illichivets Kalinine	7	(0)
2010	FK Dukla Prague	5	(0)
2011	FK Mažeikiai	25	(7)
2012	FK Kruoja Pakruojis	13	(0)
2012–2013	FC Stal Dniprodzerzhynsk	13	(2)
2013	FC Poltava	9	(0)
2013–2014	FC Karlivka	17	(6)

International career
2004	Ukraine-16	2	(0)
2008	Ukraine-21	2	(0)
- * Club domestic league appearances and goals as of 30 June 2014

Vadym Antipov (Ukrainian: Вадим Петрович Антіпов, born 11 September 1988 in Ukrainian SSR, Soviet Union) is a Ukrainian former football striker who played in the Ukrainian First League, as well as abroad in the Czech Republic and Lithuania.

He joined Czech side FK Dukla Prague in 2010, scoring the only goal of the game in a winter friendly match against SK Benešov shortly after his arrival.
