= Anatoliy Verteletsky =

Soviet footballer and Ukrainian coach

Personal information
- Date of birth: 16 August 1975 (age 51)
- Place of birth: Ukrainian SSR, USSR
- Height: 1.77 m (5 ft 10 in)
- Position: Midfielder

Senior career*
Years	Team	Apps	(Gls)
1993–1994	Chayka-VMS Sevastopol	25	(1)
1994–1995	Dynamo Saky	59	(5)
1995–2004	Stal Alchevsk	228	(14)
2000–2001	→ Stal-2 Alchevsk	2	(0)
2004	→ Stal Dniprodzerzhynsk (loan)	1	(0)
2005	Ekibastuzets	27	(1)
2006	Ahata Luhansk		
2006	Desna Chernihiv	16	(0)
2007	Mykolaiv	4	(0)
2011–2012	Khimobladnannia Severodonetsk		
2014–2016	Gvardeyets Gvardeyskoye		
- * Club domestic league appearances and goals

Anatoliy Verteletsky (Ukrainian: Вертелецький Анатолій Анатолійович; born 16 August 1975) is a Ukrainian retired footballer.

== Career ==
Anatoliy Verteletsky started playing football in Crimea at the age of 10. The first coach is Vladimir Alexandrovich Grigoriev.

He played in the Sevastopol for Chayka-VMS Sevastopol, the Dynamo Saky and the Stal Alchevsk. In Alchevsk he played 242 games and scored 15 goals, of which 25 (1) in the Major League, 203 (13) in the First League, and 14 (1) in the Ukrainian Cup. He made his debut in the top division on July 12, 2000, in a game against CSKA Kiev (1: 2). At the end of 2004, the footballer's contract with Stal expired and the club's management decided not to sign a new agreement.

Verteletsky left for Kazakhstan, where he was among eight Ukrainians playing for Ekibastuz. Anatoly's partners in the Kazakh team were Eduard Stolbovoy, Andrey Oksimets, Andrey Zavyalov, Oleg Syomka, Sergey Yakovenko and others.

Finished his career in the first-league Desna Chernihiv and Mykolaiv.

== Honours ==
Stal Alchevsk

- Ukrainian First League: 2004–05

Stal Kamianske

- Ukrainian Second League: 2003–04
