= Yevhen Yeliseyev =

Ukrainian footballer

Personal information
- Full name: Yevhen Volodymyrovych Yeliseyev
- Date of birth: 6 March 1989 (age 37)
- Place of birth: Zaporizhia, Ukrainian SSR
- Height: 1.90 m (6 ft 3 in)
- Position: Midfielder

Youth career
- 2002–2004: Metalurh Zaporizhya
- 2004–2006: Shakhtar Donetsk

Senior career*
Years	Team	Apps	(Gls)
2006–2007	Shakhtar Donetsk	0	(0)
2006	→ Shakhtar-3 Donetsk	7	(0)
2007–2009	Dnipro Cherkasy	52	(1)
2009–2010	Desna Chernihiv	36	(1)
2011–2013	Hoverla Uzhhorod	55	(3)
2013	Belshina Bobruisk	1	(0)
2015	Desna Chernihiv	25	(3)
2016	Arsenal Kyiv	1	(0)
2017	Krystal Kherson	4	(0)
- * Club domestic league appearances and goals as of 7 December 2021

Yevhen Yeliseyev (Ukrainian: Євген Володимирович Єлісєєв; born 6 March 1989) is a Ukrainian former professional footballer.
