= 2005–06 FC Desna Chernihiv season =

FC Desna Chernihiv
2005–06 season
- President: Ivan Chaus
- Manager: Oleksandr Tomakh
- Stadium: Chernihiv Stadium
- Ukrainian Second League: 1ft
- Ukrainian Cup: Round of 64 (1/32)
- Top goalscorer: League: Oleksandr Kozhemyachenko (22); All: Oleksandr Kozhemyachenko (22)
Home colours	Away colours

For the 2005–06 season, FC Desna Chernihiv competed in the Ukrainian Second League.

== Transfers ==
=== In ===
Date	Pos.	Player	Age	Moving from	Type	Fee	Source
Summer
15 June 2005	GK	(Ukraine) Viktor Litvin	20	(Ukraine) FC Nizhyn	Loan Return	Free	
15 June 2005	DF	(Ukraine) Volodymyr Polishchuk	20	(Ukraine) Vorskla Poltava	Transfer	Free	
15 June 2005	DF	(Ukraine) Anatoly Sanin	20	(Ukraine) Metalist-2 Kharkiv	Transfer	Free	
15 June 2005	MF	(Ukraine) Yaroslav Bykovets	20	(Ukraine) Polissie Dibrianka	Transfer	Free	
Winter
15 January 2006	DF	(Ukraine) Anatoly Sanin	20	(Ukraine) Metalist-2 Kharkiv	Transfer	Free	
15 January 2006	DF	(Ukraine) Serhiy Shpak	20	(Ukraine) Volyn Lutsk	On Loan	Free	

=== Out ===
Date	Pos.	Player	Age	Moving to	Type	Fee	Source
Summer
15 July 2005	GK	(Ukraine) Denys Bobrov	38	(Ukraine) Tytan Armiansk	Transfer	Free	
15 July 2005	DF	(Ukraine) Konstantin Poznyak	20	(Ukraine) Hirnyk Kryvyi Rih	Transfer	Free	
15 July 2005	DF	(Ukraine) Artem Akhrameyev	20	(Ukraine) Arsenal Kharkiv	Transfer	Free	
15 July 2005	DF	(Ukraine) Oleksiy Shubin	20	Unattached	Transfer	Free	
15 July 2005	DF	(Ukraine) Dmytro Romanenko	38	(Ukraine) Stal Alchevsk	Transfer	Free	
15 July 2005	MF	(Ukraine) Volodymyr Lutsenko	20	(Ukraine) Khimik Krasnoperekopsk	Transfer	Free	
15 July 2005	MF	(Ukraine) Serhiy Burkovsky	20	(Ukraine) Unattached	Transfer	Free	
Winter
15 January 2006	DF	(Ukraine) Volodymyr Polishchuk	20	(Ukraine) Borysfen Boryspil	Transfer	Free	
15 January 2006	DF	(Ukraine) Artem Perevozchikov	20	(Ukraine) Spartak Sumy	Transfer	Free	
15 January 2006	MF	(Ukraine) Artem Perevozchikov	20	(Ukraine) Spartak Sumy	Transfer	Free	

== Statistics ==
=== Appearances and goals ===
No.	Pos	Nat	Player	Total		Premier League		Cup	
No.	Pos	Nat	Player	Apps	Goals	Apps	Goals	Apps	Goals
Goalkeepers
	GK	(Ukraine) UKR	Yuriy Pankiv	1	0	1	0	0	0
	GK	(Ukraine) UKR	Viktor Litvin	6	0	6	0	0	0
	GK	(Ukraine) UKR	Artem Koleda	26	0	26	0	0	0
Defenders
	DF	(Ukraine) UKR	Volodymyr Polishchuk	12	0	12	0	0	0
	DF	(Ukraine) UKR	Serhiy Shpak	1	0	1	0	0	0
	DF	(Ukraine) UKR	Volodymyr Chulanov	25	0	25	0	0	0
	DF	(Ukraine) UKR	Ivan Bohatyr	18	0	18	0	0	0
	DF	(Ukraine) UKR	Oleh Ratiy	15	3	15	3	0	0
	DF	(Ukraine) UKR	Tymur Rustamov	9	2	9	2	0	0
Midfielders
	MF	(Ukraine) UKR	Valentyn Krukovets	28	16	28	16	0	0
	MF	(Ukraine) UKR	Ihor Bobovych	25	6	25	6	0	0
	MF	(Ukraine) UKR	Pavlo Shchedrakov	26	0	26	0	0	0
	MF	(Ukraine) UKR	Dmytro Kolodin	17	13	17	13	0	0
	MF	(Ukraine) UKR	Serhiy Hamal	11	0	11	0	0	0
	MF	(Ukraine) UKR	Oleh Kerchu	12	0	12	0	0	0
	MF	(Ukraine) UKR	Vitaliy Havrysh	15	9	15	9	0	0
	MF	(Ukraine) UKR	Oleksandr Babor	14	0	14	0	0	0
	MF	(Ukraine) UKR	Artem Perevozchikov	11	0	11	0	0	0
	MF	(Ukraine) UKR	Yaroslav Bykovets	16	0	16	0	0	0
Forwards
	FW	(Ukraine) UKR	Oleksandr Kozhemyachenko	28	22	28	22	0	0
	FW	(Ukraine) UKR	Sergey Alayev	23	3	23	3	0	0

Source: Competitions

Last updated: 31 May 2019

=== Goalscorers ===
Rank	No.	Pos	Nat	Name	Premier League	Cup	Europa League	Total
1		FW	(Ukraine)	Oleksandr Kozhemyachenko	22	0	0	22
2		MF	(Ukraine)	Valentyn Krukovets	16	0	0	16
3		MF	(Ukraine)	Dmytro Kolodin	13	0	0	13
4		MF	(Ukraine)	Vitaliy Havrysh	9	0	0	9
5		MF	(Ukraine)	Ihor Bobovych	6	0	0	6
6		MF	(Ukraine)	Oleh Ratiy	3	0	0	3
6		FW	(Ukraine)	Sergey Alayev	3	0	0	3
7		MF	(Ukraine)	Tymur Rustamov	2	0	0	2
				Total	74	0	0	74

Last updated: 31 May 2019
