= 2004–05 FC Desna Chernihiv season =

FC Desna Chernihiv
2004–05 season
- President: Ivan Chaus
- Manager: Oleksandr Tomakh
- Stadium: Chernihiv Stadium
- Ukrainian Second League: 2nd
- Ukrainian Cup: Round of 64 (1/32)
- Top goalscorer: League: Oleksandr Kozhemyachenko (17); All: Oleksandr Kozhemyachenko (17)
Home colours	Away colours

For the 2004–05 season, FC Desna Chernihiv competed in the Ukrainian Second League.

== Players ==
=== Squad information ===
As of 19 July 2020

Squad no.	Name	Nationality	Position	Date of birth (age)
Goalkeepers
35	Maksym Tatarenko ^{List B}	(Ukraine)	GK	7 May 1999 (aged 21)
44	Yevhen Past	(Ukraine)	GK	16 March 1988 (aged 32)
72	Ihor Lytovka	(Ukraine)	GK	5 June 1988 (aged 32)
Defenders
4	Joonas Tamm	(Estonia)	DF	2 February 1992 (aged 28)
5	Vitaliy Yermakov	(Ukraine)	DF	7 June 1992 (aged 28)
17	Andriy Hitchenko	(Ukraine)	DF	2 October 1984 (aged 35)
22	Andriy Mostovyi	(Ukraine)	DF	24 January 1988 (aged 32)
26	Yukhym Konoplya ^{List B} (on loan from Shakhtar Donetsk)	(Ukraine)	DF	26 August 1999 (aged 20)
32	Maksym Imerekov	(Ukraine)	DF	23 January 1991 (aged 29)
43	Artur Zapadnya	(Ukraine)	DF	4 June 1990 (aged 30)
45	Denys Favorov (Captain)	(Ukraine)	DF	1 April 1991 (aged 29)
Midfielders
7	Vladyslav Ohirya	(Ukraine)	MF	3 April 1990 (aged 30)
8	Andriy Dombrovskyi	(Ukraine)	MF	12 August 1995 (aged 24)
9	Levan Arveladze	(Ukraine) (Georgia (country))	MF	6 April 1993 (aged 27)
11	Vladyslav Kalitvintsev	(Ukraine)	MF	4 January 1993 (aged 27)
12	Yehor Kartushov	(Ukraine)	MF	5 January 1991 (aged 29)
14	Andriy Yakymiv ^{List B}	(Ukraine)	MF	15 June 1997 (aged 23)
16	Yevheniy Belych ^{List B}	(Ukraine)	MF	9 January 2001 (aged 19)
20	Andriy Totovytskyi	(Ukraine)	MF	20 January 1993 (aged 27)
25	Oleksiy Hutsulyak	(Ukraine)	MF	25 December 1997 (aged 22)
27	Serhiy Starenkyi	(Ukraine)	MF	20 September 1984 (aged 35)
77	Orest Kuzyk	(Ukraine)	MF	17 May 1995 (aged 25)
Forwards
10	Oleksandr Filippov	(Ukraine)	FW	23 October 1992 (aged 27)
13	Dmytro Khlyobas	(Ukraine)	FW	9 May 1994 (aged 26)
28	Pylyp Budkivskyi	(Ukraine)	FW	10 March 1992 (aged 28)

== Transfers ==
=== In ===
Date	Pos.	Player	Age	Moving from	Type	Fee	Source
Summer
15 June 2004	DF	(Ukraine) Oleksiy Shubin	20	(Ukraine) Elektrometalurh-NZF Nikopol	Transfer	Free	
15 June 2004	MF	(Ukraine) Dmytro Kolodin	38	(Belarus) Lokomotiv Vitebsk	Transfer	Free	
15 June 2004	MF	(Ukraine) Pavlo Shchedrakov	38	(Ukraine) Borysfen-2 Boryspil	Transfer	Free	
15 June 2004	MF	(Ukraine) Oleksandr Babor	20	(Ukraine) Interagrosystem Mena	Transfer	Free	
15 June 2004	DF	(Ukraine) Anatoly Sanin	38	(Ukraine) Metalist-2 Kharkiv	Transfer	Free	
Winter
15 January 2005	GK	(Ukraine) Denys Bobrov	38	(Ukraine) Polissya Zhytomyr	Transfer	Free	
15 January 2005	DF	(Ukraine) Serhiy Hamal	38	(Ukraine) Bukovyna Chernivtsi	Transfer	Free	
15 January 2005	DF	(Ukraine) Dmytro Romanenko	38	(Ukraine) Stal Alchevsk	Transfer	Free	
15 January 2005	MF	(Ukraine) Volodymyr Lutsenko	20	(Ukraine) Mykolaiv	Transfer	Free	
15 January 2005	DF	(Ukraine) Artem Akhrameyev	20	(Ukraine) Hazovyk-HGV	Transfer	Free	

=== Out ===
Date	Pos.	Player	Age	Moving from	Type	Fee	Source
Summer
15 June 2004	GK	(Ukraine) Vasyl Skybenko	25	(Ukraine) Spartak Ivano-Frankivsk	Transfer	Free	
15 June 2004	DF	(Serbia and Montenegro) Milan Zagorac	20	(Ukraine) Kryvbas Kryvyi Rih	Transfer	Free	
15 June 2004	DF	(Ukraine) Yuriy Yakovenko	20	Unattached	Transfer	Free	
15 June 2004	MF	(Ukraine) Yaroslav Bykovets	20	(Ukraine) Polissie Dibrianka	Transfer	Free	

== Statistics ==
=== Appearances and goals ===
No.	Pos	Nat	Player	Total		Premier League		Cup	
No.	Pos	Nat	Player	Apps	Goals	Apps	Goals	Apps	Goals
Goalkeepers
	GK	(Ukraine) UKR	Denys Bobrov	4	0	4	0	0	0
	GK	(Ukraine) UKR	Artem Koleda	26	0	26	0	0	0
Defenders
	DF	(Ukraine) UKR	Artem Akhrameyev	14	0	14	0	0	0
	DF	(Ukraine) UKR	Oleksiy Shubin	8	0	8	0	0	0
	DF	(Ukraine) UKR	Anatoly Sanin	1	0	1	0	0	0
	DF	(Ukraine) UKR	Serhiy Burkovsky	1	0	1	0	0	0
	DF	(Ukraine) UKR	Dmytro Romanenko	3	0	3	0	0	0
	DF	(Ukraine) UKR	Konstantin Poznyak	13	0	13	0	0	0
Midfielders
	MF	(Ukraine) UKR	Valentyn Krukovets	27	5	27	5	0	0
	MF	(Ukraine) UKR	Dmytro Kolodin	6	0	6	0	0	0
	MF	(Ukraine) UKR	Serhiy Hamal	12	0	12	0	0	0
	MF	(Ukraine) UKR	Vitaliy Havrysh	19	2	19	2	0	0
	MF	(Ukraine) UKR	Oleksandr Savenchuk	12	0	12	0	0	0
	MF	(Ukraine) UKR	Ihor Bobovych	21	11	21	11	0	0
	MF	(Ukraine) UKR	Volodymyr Lutsenko	4	0	4	0	0	0
	MF	(Ukraine) UKR	Pavlo Shchedrakov	6	1	6	1	0	0
	MF	(Ukraine) UKR	Oleksandr Babor	26	2	26	2	0	0
	DF	(Ukraine) UKR	Artem Perevozchikov	18	3	18	3	0	0
Forwards
	FW	(Ukraine) UKR	Oleksandr Kozhemyachenko	22	17	22	17	0	0
	FW	(Ukraine) UKR	Ihor Bobovych	28	13	28	13	0	0
	FW	(Ukraine) UKR	Sergey Alayev	15	3	15	3	0	0

Source: Competitions

Last updated: 31 May 2019

=== Goalscorers ===
Rank	No.	Pos	Nat	Name	Premier League	Cup	Europa League	Total
1		FW	(Ukraine)	Oleksandr Kozhemyachenko	17	0	0	17
2		MF	(Ukraine)	Dmytro Kolodin	13	0	0	13
2		FW	(Ukraine)	Ihor Bobovych	13	0	0	13
3		MF	(Ukraine)	Valentyn Krukovets	5	0	0	5
4		FW	(Ukraine)	Sergey Alayev	3	0	0	3
5		MF	(Ukraine)	Vitaliy Havrysh	2	0	0	2
5		MF	(Ukraine)	Oleksandr Babor	2	0	0	2
6		MF	(Ukraine)	Pavlo Shchedrakov	1	0	0	1
				Total	56	0	0	56

Last updated: 31 May 2019
