= 2002–03 FC Desna Chernihiv season =

FC Desna Chernihiv
2002–03 season
- President: Ivan Chaus
- Manager: Vadym Lazorenko
- Stadium: Chernihiv Stadium
- Ukrainian Second League: 3rd
- Ukrainian Cup: Round of 64 (1/32)
- Top goalscorer: League: Volodymyr Avramenko (6); All: Volodymyr Avramenko (6)
Home colours	Away colours

For the 2002–03 season, FC Desna Chernihiv competed in the Ukrainian Second League.

== Transfers ==
=== In ===
Date	Pos.	Player	Age	Moving from	Type	Fee	Source
Summer
15 June 2002	GK	(Ukraine) Vasyl Skybenko	23	(Ukraine) Spartak Ivano-Frankivsk	Transfer	Free	
15 June 2002	GK	(Ukraine) Artem Koleda	20	(Ukraine) Krystal Kherson	Transfer	Free	
15 June 2002	DF	(Ukraine) Mykola Zuyenko	20	(Ukraine) Prykarpattia	Transfer	Free	
15 June 2002	MF	(Ukraine) Oleksandr Babor	20	(Ukraine) Ros Bila Tserkva	Transfer	Free	
15 June 2002	MF	(Azerbaijan) Vladislav Nosenko	20	(Latvia) Dinaburg	Transfer	Free	
15 June 2002	MF	(Ukraine) Dmytro Trukhin	20	(Ukraine) Sokil Zolochiv	Transfer	Free	
15 June 2002	MF	(Ukraine) Sergey Shurkhal	20	(Ukraine) Kherson	Transfer	Free	
15 June 2002	FW	(Ukraine) Oleh Hrytsai	20	(Ukraine) Polissya Zhytomyr	Transfer	Free	
15 June 2002	DF	(Ukraine) Denys Volk-Karachevskyi	20	(Ukraine) Sokil Zolochiv	On Loan	Free	
15 June 2002	MF	(Ukraine) Yaroslav Bykovets	20	(Ukraine) SDYuShOR Desna	On Loan	Free	
16 June 2002	MF	(Ukraine) Mykola Zuyenko	20	(Ukraine) Spartak Ivano-Frankivsk	Transfer	Free	
Winter
15 January 2003	MF	(Ukraine) Vitaliy Havrysh	20	(Ukraine) Desna Chernihiv Academy	Transfer	Free	
15 January 2003	MF	(Ukraine) Valentyn Krukovets	20	(Ukraine) Sokil Zolochiv	On Loan	Free	
15 January 2003	MF	(Ukraine) Denys Skepskyi	20	(Ukraine) Dynamo Kyiv	Transfer	Free	
15 January 2003	DF	(Ukraine) Dmytro Lelyuk	20	(Ukraine) Kryvbas Kryvyi Rih	Transfer	Free	
15 January 2003	FW	(Ukraine) Oleksandr Kozhemyachenko	20	(Ukraine) Sokil Zolochiv	Transfer	Free	

=== Out ===
Date	Pos.	Player	Age	Moving to	Type	Fee	Source
Summer
15 July 2002	GK	(Ukraine) Artem Padun	20	(Ukraine) Arsenal Bila Tserkva	Transfer	Free	
15 July 2002	GK	(Ukraine) Yuriy Melashenko	20	(Ukraine) Spartak Ivano-Frankivsk	Transfer	Free	
15 July 2002	DF	(Ukraine) Oleksandr Selivanov	20	(Ukraine) Yevropa Pryluky	Transfer	Free	
15 July 2002	DF	(Ukraine) Yuriy Bondarenko	20	(Ukraine) FC Nizhyn	Transfer	Free	
15 July 2002	DF	(Ukraine) Oleksandr Malevanov	20	(Ukraine) Stal Kamianske	Transfer	Free	
15 July 2002	MF	(Ukraine) Oleh Fedoruk	20	(Ukraine) Elektrometalurh-NZF	Transfer	Free	
15 July 2002	FW	(Ukraine) Oleksandr Kozhemyachenko	20	(Ukraine) Sokil Zolochiv	Transfer	Free	
15 July 2002	FW	(Ukraine) Yuriy Yakovenko	20	(Ukraine) Sokil Zolochiv	Transfer	Free	
Winter
15 January 2003	GK	(Ukraine) Artem Koleda	20	(Ukraine) Krystal Kherson	Transfer	Free	
15 January 2003	DF	(Ukraine) Maksym Markelov	20	(Ukraine) Sokil Zolochiv	Transfer	Free	
15 January 2003	DF	(Ukraine) Oleh Sobekh	20	(Ukraine) FC Nizhyn	Transfer	Free	
15 January 2003	MF	(Ukraine) Oleksandr Babor	20	(Ukraine) Sokil Zolochiv	Transfer	Free	
15 January 2003	MF	(Ukraine) Artem Perevozchikov	20	(Ukraine) Sokil Zolochiv	Transfer	Free	
15 January 2003	MF	(Ukraine) Sergey Shurkhal	20	(Ukraine) Sokil Zolochiv	Transfer	Free	
15 January 2003	FW	(Ukraine) Oleh Hrytsai	20	(Ukraine) Polissya Zhytomyr	Transfer	Free	
15 January 2003	MF	(Ukraine) Volodymyr Avramenko	20	(Ukraine) Sokil Zolochiv	Transfer	Free	
15 January 2003	MF	(Ukraine) Oleksandr Savenchuk	20	(Ukraine) Sokil Zolochiv	Transfer	Free	
15 January 2003	DF	(Ukraine) Denys Volk-Karachevskyi	20	(Ukraine) Sokil Zolochiv	Transfer	Free	
15 January 2003	MF	(Ukraine) Yaroslav Bykovets	20	(Ukraine) Sokil Zolochiv	Transfer	Free	

== Statistics ==
=== Appearances and goals ===
No.	Pos	Nat	Player	Total		Premier League		Cup	
No.	Pos	Nat	Player	Apps	Goals	Apps	Goals	Apps	Goals
	GK	(Ukraine) UKR	Vasyl Skybenko	23	0	22	0	1	0
	GK	(Ukraine) UKR	Yuriy Ovcharov	2	0	2	0	0	0
	GK	(Ukraine) UKR	Artem Koleda	1	0	1	0	0	0
Defenders
	DF	(Ukraine) UKR	Mykola Zuyenko	21	0	21	0	0	0
	DF	(Ukraine) UKR	Oleksandr Romanchuk	11	0	11	0	0	0
	DF	(Ukraine) UKR	Denys Volk-Karachevskyi	1	0	1	0	0	0
	DF	(Ukraine) UKR	Oleh Sobekh	9	0	9	0	0	0
	DF	(Azerbaijan) AZE	Vladislav Nosenko	11	0	11	0	0	0
	DF	(Ukraine) UKR	Dmytro Lelyuk	12	1	12	1	0	0
	DF	(Ukraine) UKR	Konstantin Poznyak	15	0	15	0	0	0
Midfielders
	MF	(Ukraine) UKR	Volodymyr Avramenko	24	6	24	6	0	0
	MF	(Ukraine) UKR	Valentyn Krukovets	16	5	16	5	0	0
	MF	(Ukraine) UKR	Oleksandr Savenchuk	19	3	19	3	0	0
	MF	(Ukraine) UKR	Vitaliy Havrysh	1	0	1	0	0	0
	MF	(Ukraine) UKR	Dmytro Trukhin	1	0	1	0	0	0
	MF	(Ukraine) UKR	Denys Skepskyi	1	0	1	0	0	0
	MF	(Ukraine) UKR	Oleksandr Babor	25	2	25	2	0	0
	MF	(Ukraine) UKR	Maksym Markelov	1	0	1	0	0	0
	MF	(Ukraine) UKR	Artem Perevozchikov	25	6	25	6	0	0
	MF	(Ukraine) UKR	Sergey Shurkhal	7	0	7	0	0	0
Forwards
	MF	(Ukraine) UKR	Oleh Hrytsai	11	0	11	0	0	0
	MF	(Ukraine) UKR	Yaroslav Bykovets	0	0	0	0	0	0
	FW	(Ukraine) UKR	Oleksandr Kozhemyachenko	25	4	25	4	0	0
	FW	(Ukraine) UKR	Eldar Allakhverdiyev	23	3	23	3	0	0
	FW	(Ukraine) UKR	Kostiantyn Trukhanov	10	0	10	0	0	0
	FW	(Ukraine) UKR	Sergey Alayev	11	2	11	2	0	0

Source: Competitions

Last updated: 31 May 2019

=== Goalscorers ===
Rank	No.	Pos	Nat	Name	Premier League	Cup	Europa League	Total
1		MF	(Ukraine)	Volodymyr Avramenko	6	0	0	6
2		MF	(Ukraine)	Valentyn Krukovets	5	0	0	5
3		MF	(Ukraine)	Oleksandr Kozhemyachenko	4	0	0	4
4		DF	(Ukraine)	Oleksandr Savenchuk	3	0	0	3
4		MF	(Ukraine)	Eldar Allakhverdiyev	3	0	0	3
3		FW	(Ukraine)	Sergey Alayev	2	0	0	2
3		MF	(Ukraine)	Oleksandr Babor	2	0	0	2
				Total	25	0	0	25

Last updated: 31 May 2019
