= 2003–04 FC Desna Chernihiv season =

FC Desna Chernihiv
2003–04 season
- President: Ivan Chaus
- Manager: Vadym Lazorenko
- Stadium: Chernihiv Stadium
- Ukrainian Second League: 2nd
- Ukrainian Cup: Round of 64 (1/32)
- Top goalscorer: League: Oleksandr Kozhemyachenko (15); All: Oleksandr Kozhemyachenko (15)
Home colours	Away colours

For the 2003–04 season, FC Desna Chernihiv competed in the Ukrainian Second League.

== Players ==
=== Squad information ===
As of 19 July 2020

Squad no.	Name	Nationality	Position	Date of birth (age)
Goalkeepers
35	Maksym Tatarenko ^{List B}	(Ukraine)	GK	7 May 1999 (aged 21)
44	Yevhen Past	(Ukraine)	GK	16 March 1988 (aged 32)
72	Ihor Lytovka	(Ukraine)	GK	5 June 1988 (aged 32)
Defenders
4	Joonas Tamm	(Estonia)	DF	2 February 1992 (aged 28)
5	Vitaliy Yermakov	(Ukraine)	DF	7 June 1992 (aged 28)
17	Andriy Hitchenko	(Ukraine)	DF	2 October 1984 (aged 35)
22	Andriy Mostovyi	(Ukraine)	DF	24 January 1988 (aged 32)
26	Yukhym Konoplya ^{List B} (on loan from Shakhtar Donetsk)	(Ukraine)	DF	26 August 1999 (aged 20)
32	Maksym Imerekov	(Ukraine)	DF	23 January 1991 (aged 29)
43	Artur Zapadnya	(Ukraine)	DF	4 June 1990 (aged 30)
45	Denys Favorov (Captain)	(Ukraine)	DF	1 April 1991 (aged 29)
Midfielders
7	Vladyslav Ohirya	(Ukraine)	MF	3 April 1990 (aged 30)
8	Andriy Dombrovskyi	(Ukraine)	MF	12 August 1995 (aged 24)
9	Levan Arveladze	(Ukraine) (Georgia (country))	MF	6 April 1993 (aged 27)
11	Vladyslav Kalitvintsev	(Ukraine)	MF	4 January 1993 (aged 27)
12	Yehor Kartushov	(Ukraine)	MF	5 January 1991 (aged 29)
14	Andriy Yakymiv ^{List B}	(Ukraine)	MF	15 June 1997 (aged 23)
16	Yevheniy Belych ^{List B}	(Ukraine)	MF	9 January 2001 (aged 19)
20	Andriy Totovytskyi	(Ukraine)	MF	20 January 1993 (aged 27)
25	Oleksiy Hutsulyak	(Ukraine)	MF	25 December 1997 (aged 22)
27	Serhiy Starenkyi	(Ukraine)	MF	20 September 1984 (aged 35)
77	Orest Kuzyk	(Ukraine)	MF	17 May 1995 (aged 25)
Forwards
10	Oleksandr Filippov	(Ukraine)	FW	23 October 1992 (aged 27)
13	Dmytro Khlyobas	(Ukraine)	FW	9 May 1994 (aged 26)
28	Pylyp Budkivskyi	(Ukraine)	FW	10 March 1992 (aged 28)

== Transfers ==
=== In ===
Date	Pos.	Player	Age	Moving from	Type	Fee	Source
Summer
15 June 2002	GK	(Ukraine) Artem Koleda	20	(Ukraine) Krystal Kherson	Transfer	Free	
15 June 2003	DF	(Serbia and Montenegro) Milan Zagorac	20	(Serbia and Montenegro) OFK Beograd	Transfer	Free	
15 June 2003	MF	(Ukraine) Oleksandr Babor	20	(Ukraine) Sokil Zolochiv	Transfer	Free	
15 June 2003	MF	(Ukraine) Artem Perevozchikov	20	(Ukraine) Sokil Zolochiv	Transfer	Free	
15 June 2003	FW	(Ukraine) Volodymyr Avramenko	20	(Ukraine) Sokil Zolochiv	Transfer	Free	
15 June 2003	MF	(Ukraine) Oleksandr Savenchuk	20	(Ukraine) Sokil Zolochiv	Transfer	Free	
15 June 2003	DF	(Ukraine) Denys Anelikov	20	(Ukraine) Shakhtar-3 Donetsk	Transfer	Free	
15 June 2003	DF	(Ukraine) Oleh Syzon	20	(Ukraine) Borysfen-2 Boryspil	Transfer	Free	
15 June 2003	MF	(Ukraine) Valentyn Krukovets	20	(Ukraine) Sokil Zolochiv	Transfer	Free	
15 June 2003	FW	(Ukraine) Ihor Bobovych	20	(Ukraine) Chornomorets Odesa	Transfer	Free	
15 June 2003	MF	(Ukraine) Yaroslav Bykovets	20	(Ukraine) Sokil Zolochiv	Transfer	Free	
Winter
15 January 2004	DF	(Azerbaijan) Vladislav Nosenko	20	(Ukraine) Zorya Luhansk	Transfer	Free	
15 January 2004	MF	(Ukraine) Oleksandr Dmytruk	20	(Ukraine) Borysfen Boryspil	Transfer	Free	
15 January 2004	MF	(Ukraine) Oleksandr Gonchar	20	(Ukraine) Borysfen Boryspil	Transfer	Free	
15 January 2004	FW	(Ukraine) Sergey Alayev	20	(Ukraine) Polesie Dobryanka	Transfer	Free	

=== Out ===
Date	Pos.	Player	Age	Moving to	Type	Fee	Source
Summer
15 July 2003	GK	(Ukraine) Yuriy Ovcharov	38	(Ukraine) Unattached	Transfer	Free	
15 June 2003	DF	(Ukraine) Mykola Zuyenko	20	(Ukraine) Podillya Khmelnytskyi	Transfer	Free	
Winter
15 January 2004	DF	(Ukraine) Oleksandr Romanchuk	20	(Ukraine) Dynamo-3 Kyiv	Transfer	Free	
15 January 2004	DF	(Ukraine) Dmytro Romanenko	38	(Ukraine) Stal Alchevsk	Transfer	Free	
15 January 2004	MF	(Ukraine) Oleksandr Babor	20	(Ukraine) Interagrosystem Mena	Transfer	Free	
15 January 2004	MF	(Ukraine) Oleksandr Dmytruk	20	(Ukraine) Boreks-Borysfen	Transfer	Free	
15 January 2004	DF	(Ukraine) Denys Anelikov	20	(Ukraine) Shakhtar-2 Donetsk	Transfer	Free	
15 January 2004	DF	(Ukraine) Oleh Syzon	20	(Ukraine) Borysfen Boryspil	Transfer	Free	
15 January 2004	MF	(Ukraine) Oleksandr Gonchar	20	(Ukraine) Boreks-Borysfen	Transfer	Free	

== Statistics ==
=== Appearances and goals ===
No.	Pos	Nat	Player	Total		Premier League		Cup	
No.	Pos	Nat	Player	Apps	Goals	Apps	Goals	Apps	Goals
Goalkeepers
	GK	(Ukraine) UKR	Vasyl Skybenko	29	0	28	0	1	0
	GK	(Ukraine) UKR	Denys Bobrov	4	0	4	0	0	0
	GK	(Ukraine) UKR	Artem Koleda	5	0	5	0	0	0
Defenders
	DF	(Ukraine) UKR	Oleksandr Romanchuk	13	0	13	0	0	0
	DF	(Ukraine) UKR	Denys Anelikov	7	0	7	0	0	0
	DF	(Ukraine) UKR	Serhiy Burkovsky	11	0	11	0	0	0
	DF	(Ukraine) UKR	Vladislav Nosenko	11	0	11	0	0	0
	DF	(Ukraine) UKR	Oleh Karamushka	4	0	4	0	0	0
	DF	(Serbia) SRB	Milan Zagorac	25	0	25	0	0	0
	DF	(Ukraine) UKR	Artem Akhrameyev	13	2	13	2	0	0
	DF	(Ukraine) UKR	Oleg Syzon	9	0	9	0	0	0
	DF	(Ukraine) UKR	Dmytro Romanenko	13	0	13	0	0	0
	DF	(Ukraine) UKR	Artem Perevozchikov	14	2	14	2	0	0
	DF	(Ukraine) UKR	Konstantin Poznyak	25	0	25	0	0	0
Midfielders
	MF	(Ukraine) UKR	Volodymyr Avramenko	23	3	23	3	0	0
	MF	(Ukraine) UKR	Valentyn Krukovets	22	11	22	11	0	0
	MF	(Ukraine) UKR	Oleksandr Gonchar	4	0	4	0	0	0
	MF	(Ukraine) UKR	Oleksandr Savenchuk	29	5	29	5	0	0
	MF	(Ukraine) UKR	Vitaliy Havrysh	10	2	10	2	0	0
	MF	(Ukraine) UKR	Denys Skepskyi	1	0	1	0	0	0
	MF	(Ukraine) UKR	Ihor Bobovych	26	10	26	10	0	0
	MF	(Ukraine) UKR	Oleksandr Dmytruk	2	1	2	1	0	0
	MF	(Ukraine) UKR	Oleksandr Babor	8	0	8	0	0	0
Forwards
	FW	(Ukraine) UKR	Oleksandr Kozhemyachenko	29	15	29	15	0	0
	FW	(Ukraine) UKR	Yuriy Yakovenko	14	0	14	0	0	0
	FW	(Ukraine) UKR	Sergey Alayev	18	6	18	6	0	0

Source: Competitions

Last updated: 31 May 2019

=== Goalscorers ===
Rank	No.	Pos	Nat	Name	Premier League	Cup	Europa League	Total
1		FW	(Ukraine)	Oleksandr Kozhemyachenko	15	0	0	15
2		MF	(Ukraine)	Valentyn Krukovets	11	0	0	11
3		FW	(Ukraine)	Ihor Bobovych	10	0	0	10
4		FW	(Ukraine)	Sergey Alayev	6	0	0	6
5		MF	(Ukraine)	Oleksandr Savenchuk	5	0	0	5
6		MF	(Ukraine)	Volodymyr Avramenko	3	0	0	3
7		DF	(Ukraine)	Artem Akhrameyev	2	0	0	2
7		MF	(Ukraine)	Vitaliy Havrysh	2	0	0	2
8		MF	(Ukraine)	Oleksandr Dmytruk	1	0	0	1
				Total	55	0	0	55

Last updated: 31 May 2019
