= FC Desna Chernihiv Player of the Year =

Professional football club based in Chernihiv, Ukraine

Desna Chernihiv
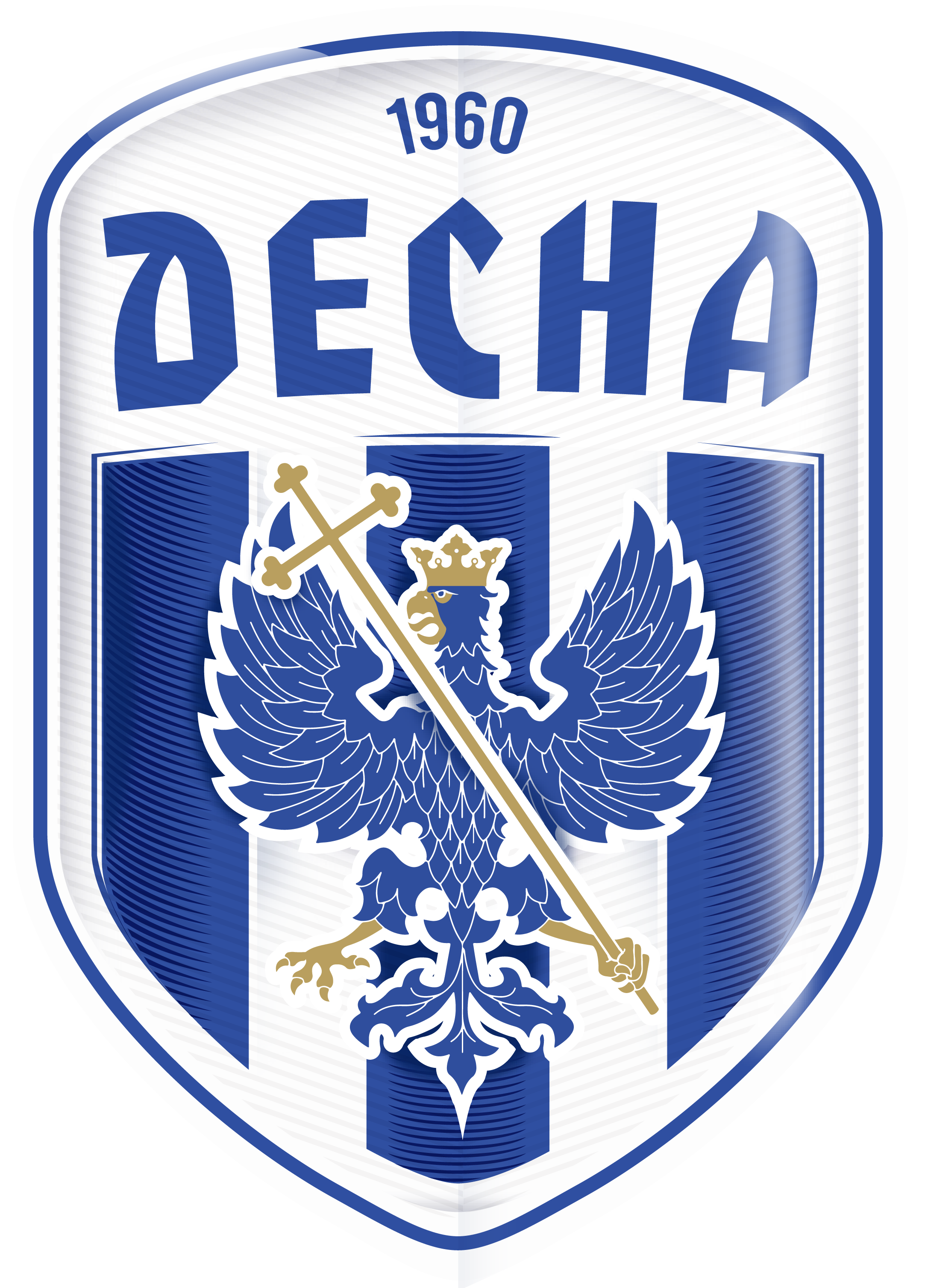
- Full name: Football Club Desna Chernihiv
- Nickname: Siveriany
- Founded: 1960
- Ground: Chernihiv Stadium
- Capacity: 12,060
- Website: http://desna.football/

The FFC Desna Chernihiv Player of the Year award is voted for annually by the members of the official fan club for FC Desna Chernihiv, in recognition of the best overall performance by an individual player throughout the football season. Towards the end of each season, members are invited to cast their votes for this award. The winner is the player who polls the most votes. The recipient is awarded a diploma, presented on the pitch before one of the last home games of the season.

== Winners ==
Season	Name	Age	Position	Nationality	International Caps	Current club
2023	Not held due to the war	-				
2022	Denys Bezborodko	27	Striker	Ukraine	77	(Ukraine) Chernihiv
2021	Andriy Totovytskyi	28	Midfielder	Ukraine	43	Retired
2020	Oleksandr Filippov	27	Striker	Ukraine	138	(Ukraine) Polissya Zhytomyr
2019	Denys Favorov	31	Midfielder	Ukraine	139	Retired
2018	Denys Bezborodko	27	Striker	Ukraine	77	(Ukraine) Chernihiv
2017	Oleksandr Filippov	27	Striker	Ukraine	138	(Ukraine) Polissya Zhytomyr
2016	Yevhen Chepurnenko	32	Midfielder	Ukraine	218	(Ukraine) Kalynivka
2015	Yehor Kartushov	31	Midfielder	Ukraine	244	(Ukraine) Chernihiv
2014	Yevhen Chepurnenko	32	Midfielder	Ukraine	218	(Ukraine) Kalynivka
2013	Petro Kondratyuk	43	Midfielder	Ukraine	133	Retired
2012	Roman Poltavets	38	Striker	Ukraine	18	Retired
2011	Oleksandr Kozhemyachenko	43	Striker	Ukraine	295	Retired
2010	Serhiy Hrybanov	40	Striker	Ukraine	39	Retired
2009	Ruslan Zeynalov	39	Midfielder	Ukraine	13	Retired
2008	Volodymyr Postolatyev	42	Striker	Ukraine	25	Retired
2007	Valentyn Krukovets	45	Striker	Ukraine	212	Retired
2006	Oleksandr Kozhemyachenko	43	Striker	Ukraine	295	Retired
2005	Oleksandr Kozhemyachenko	43	Striker	Ukraine	295	Retired
2004	Oleksandr Kozhemyachenko	43	Striker	Ukraine	295	Retired

== Wins by playing position ==
Position	Number of winners
Goalkeeper	0
Defender	0
Midfielder	7
Forward	12

== Wins by nationality ==
Nationality	Number of winners
Ukraine	19
