= 2005–06 in Ukrainian football =

Football in Ukraine
- Season: 2005–06

Men's football
- Premier League: Shakhtar Donetsk
- League 1: Zorya Luhansk
- League 2: Desna Chernihiv (Group A); MFC Mykolaiv (Group B); FC Dnipro Cherkasy (Group C)
- Amateur League: Shakhtar Sverdlovsk (2006); Ivan Odesa (2005)
- Cup: Dynamo Kyiv
- Amateur Cup: Karpaty Kamianka-Buzka (2006); Pivdenstal Yenakieve (2005)
- Super Cup: Shakhtar Donetsk

Women's football
- League High: Zhytlobud-1 Kharkiv (2006); Lehenda Chernihiv (2005)
- Women's Cup: Zhytlobud-1 Kharkiv (2006); Lehenda Chernihiv (2005)

The 2005–06 season was the 15th season of competitive association football in Ukraine since dissolution of the Soviet Union.

== Men's club football ==
League	Promoted to league	Relegated from league
Premier League	Stal Alchevsk; FC Kharkiv	Obolon Kyiv; Borysfen Boryspil
League One	Enerhetyk Burshtyn; FC Bershad; Krymteplytsia Molodizhne; Helios Kharkiv	Nafkom Brovary; MFC Mykolaiv; ~~Nyva Vinnytsia~~; ~~Polissia Zhytomyr~~
League Two	Yalos Yalta; Kremin Kremenchuk; Sokil Berezhany; Khimik Krasnoperekopsk; Yednist' Plysky; MFC Zhytomyr; Zhytychi Zhytomyr; Arsenal Kharkiv; Kryvbas-2 Kryvyi Rih; FC Kharkiv-2; Knyazha Shchaslyve; FC Boyarka 2006	~~Tekhno-Tsenter Rohatyn~~; ~~Spartak-2 Kalush~~; ~~Osvita Kyiv~~; ~~Palmira Odesa~~; ~~Real Odesa~~; ~~Elektrometalurh-NZF Nikopol~~; ~~Molniya Sieverodonetsk~~; ~~Uholyok Dymytrov~~; ~~Metalist-2 Kharkiv~~; ~~Vorskla-2 Poltava~~

Note: For all scratched clubs, see section Clubs removed for more details

=== Premier League ===
Pos	Team	Pld	W	D	L	GF	GA	GD	Pts	Qualification or relegation
1	Shakhtar Donetsk (C)	30	23	6	1	64	14	+50	75	Qualification to Champions League third qualifying round
2	Dynamo Kyiv	30	23	6	1	68	20	+48	75	Qualification to Champions League second qualifying round
3	Chornomorets Odesa	30	13	6	11	36	31	+5	45	Qualification to UEFA Cup second qualifying round
4	Illychivets Mariupol	30	12	7	11	30	34	−4	43	
5	Metalist Kharkiv	30	12	7	11	35	42	−7	43	
6	Dnipro Dnipropetrovsk	30	11	10	9	33	23	+10	43	Qualification to Intertoto Cup second round
7	Tavriya Simferopol	30	11	6	13	29	31	−2	39	
8	Metalurh Zaporizhya	30	11	6	13	32	40	−8	39	Qualification to UEFA Cup second qualifying round
9	Metalurh Donetsk	30	10	9	11	35	35	0	39	
10	Vorskla Poltava	30	9	10	11	28	34	−6	37	
11	Stal Alchevsk	30	9	9	12	26	39	−13	36	
12	Arsenal Kyiv	30	9	8	13	31	39	−8	35	
13	FC Kharkiv	30	9	6	15	29	36	−7	33	
14	Kryvbas Kryvyi Rih	30	9	6	15	27	35	−8	33	
15	Volyn Lutsk (R)	30	9	6	15	31	45	−14	33	Relegated to Ukrainian First League
16	Zakarpattia Uzhhorod (R)	30	3	6	21	17	53	−36	15	Relegated to Ukrainian First League

Source: uafootball.net.ua
(C) Champions; (R) Relegated
14 May 2006
18:00 LST

Shakhtar Donetsk	2 – 1 (a.e.t.)	Dynamo Kyiv
Marica 59'; Aghahowa 100'	Report	Rodolfo 79'

Metalurh Stadium, Kryvyi Rih
Attendance: 29,734
Referee: Ľ. Micheľ (Slovakia), (FIFA)

=== League 1 ===
Pos	Team	Pld	W	D	L	GF	GA	GD	Pts	Promotion or relegation
1	Zorya Luhansk (C, P)	34	27	6	1	74	13	+61	87	Promoted to Vyshcha Liha
2	Karpaty Lviv (P)	34	25	5	4	53	14	+39	80	Promoted to Vyshcha Liha
3	Obolon Kyiv	34	22	6	6	51	19	+32	72	
4	Naftovyk-Ukrnafta Okhtyrka	34	17	7	10	50	35	+15	58	
5	Dynamo-2 Kyiv	34	15	7	12	51	36	+15	52	
6	Hazovyk-Skala Stryi	34	14	10	10	35	33	+2	52	
7	Podillya Khmelnytskyi	34	14	7	13	39	37	+2	49	
8	Stal Dniprodzerzhynsk	34	13	9	12	34	29	+5	48	
9	Krymteplitsia Molodizhne	34	12	11	11	35	34	+1	47	
10	Spartak Ivano-Frankivsk	34	10	15	9	33	31	+2	45	
11	Shakhtar-2 Donetsk (D)	34	12	8	14	37	42	−5	44	Withdrew
12	Helios Kharkiv	34	12	8	14	26	35	−9	44	
13	Dynamo-Ihroservis Simferopol	34	10	8	16	40	51	−11	38	
14	Enerhetyk Burshtyn	34	8	12	14	31	44	−13	36	
15	CSKA Kyiv	34	8	8	18	25	52	−27	32	
16	Borysfen Boryspil	34	3	14	17	23	46	−23	23	
17	Spartak Sumy	34	5	5	24	28	68	−40	20	Avoided relegation
18	FC Bershad (D)	34	3	4	27	14	60	−46	4	Withdrew

Source: www.uafootball.net.ua
(C) Champions; (D) Disqualified; (P) Promoted

=== League 2 ===
Pos	Team	Pld	W	D	L	GF	GA	GD	Pts	Promotion or relegation
1	FC Desna Chernihiv (C, P)	28	24	2	2	76	13	+63	74	Promoted to First League
2	FC Fakel Ivano-Frankivsk	28	19	5	4	56	24	+32	62	
3	FC Rava Rava-Ruska	28	18	4	6	37	13	+24	58	Withdrew (Note: FC Rava Rava-Ruska completed the season and failed to submit a license for the next season.)
4	FC Nyva Ternopil	28	14	8	6	34	18	+16	50	
5	FC Karpaty-2 Lviv	28	14	4	10	39	36	+3	46	
6	FC Bukovyna Chernivtsi	28	13	5	10	38	33	+5	44	
7	FC Veres Rivne	28	12	6	10	33	40	−7	42	
8	FC Zhytychi Zhytomyr	28	10	11	7	38	34	+4	41	Withdrew (Note: FC Zhytychi Zhytomyr entered the competition after the breakup of FC Polissya Zhytomyr which competed in the Ukrainian First League from the prior season. After completing the season they failed to submit a license for the next season.)
9	FC Obolon-2 Kyiv	28	9	8	11	31	36	−5	35	
10	FC Chornohora Ivano-Frankivsk	28	7	8	13	25	32	−7	29	Withdrew (Note: FC Chornohora Ivano-Frankivsk completed the season, submitted a license for the next season but failed to pay the fee and thus were removed from the PFL.)
11	FC Dynamo-3 Kyiv	28	7	8	13	17	28	−11	29	
12	FC Knyazha Schaslyve	28	6	11	11	32	35	−3	29	
13	FC Naftovyk Dolyna	28	8	3	17	22	45	−23	27	
14	MFC Zhytomyr	28	3	2	23	16	38	−22	11	Withdrew (Note: MFC Zhytomyr entered the competition after the breakup of FC Polissya Zhytomyr from the prior season. They withdrew after the 21st round when after the Zhytomyr city elections in March 2006, the city decided not to continue funding the club the team was dissolved. (April 30th, 2006). Their games were considered technical losses for the rest of the season.)
15	FC Boyarka-2006 Boyarka	28	2	3	23	13	82	−69	9	Renamed (Note: During the season FC Osvita Kyiv became financially insolvent and withdrew. Administration moved to Boyarka where they changed the team name to FC Boyarka-2006. This was ratified by the UFF. (March 23rd, 2006))
-	FC Sokil Berezhany	0	-	-	-	-	-	—	0	Removed from the competition (Note: FC Sokil Berezhany were admitted into the PFL and after two games withdrew. Their record was one draw and one loss, scoring one goal and having 8 scored against. They were removed from the competition.)

(C) Champions; (P) Promoted
Notes:

Pos	Team	Pld	W	D	L	GF	GA	GD	Pts	Promotion or relegation
1	MFK Mykolaiv (C, P)	28	22	3	3	56	11	+45	69	Promoted to First League
2	PFC Oleksandria (P)	28	20	5	3	52	14	+38	65	Promoted to First League (Note: PFC Oleksandria were promoted to the Ukrainian First League for the 2006–07 season as the best 2nd placed team in amongst the three Second League teams within the Groups.)
3	FC Sevastopol	28	15	6	7	48	29	+19	51	
4	FC Yalos Yalta	28	12	7	9	28	27	+1	43	Withdrew (Note: FC Yalos Yalta completed the season and failed to submit a license for the next season.)
5	FC Kryvbas-2 Kryvyi Rih	28	11	6	11	45	43	+2	39	Withdrew (Note: FC Kryvbas-2 Kryvyi Rih completed the season but the main club Kryvbas Kryvyi Rih was in financial difficulty and consolidated their reserve and junior club to play in the reserves competition in the next season.)
6	FC Yednist' Plysky	28	10	8	10	38	36	+2	38	
7	FC Dnister Ovidiopol	28	10	8	10	28	27	+1	38	
8	FC Khimik Krasnoperekopsk	28	11	5	12	24	30	−6	38	
9	FC Zirka Kirovohrad	28	11	4	13	23	36	−13	37	Withdrew (Note: FC Zirka Kirovohrad completed the season and failed to submit a license for the next season due to financial insolvency.)
10	FC Tytan Armyansk	28	8	9	11	33	39	−6	33	
11	FC Hirnik Kryvyi Rih	28	7	11	10	23	34	−11	32	
12	Enerhiya Pivdenoukrainsk	28	6	8	14	29	45	−16	26	
13	FC Krystal Kherson	28	7	4	17	29	51	−22	25	Withdrew (Note: FC Krystal Kherson completed the season and failed to submit a license for the next season due to financial insolvency.)
14	FC Olkom Melitopol	28	6	7	15	25	39	−14	25	
15	FC Ros Bila Tserkva	28	5	7	16	26	45	−19	22	

(C) Champions; (P) Promoted
Notes:

Pos	Team	Pld	W	D	L	GF	GA	GD	Pts	Promotion or relegation
1	FC Dnipro Cherkasy (C, P)	24	18	3	3	49	22	+27	57	Promoted to First League
2	FC Illichivets-2 Mariupol	24	15	1	8	43	22	+21	46	
3	FC Metalurh-2 Zaporizhzhia	24	13	4	7	39	24	+15	43	
4	FC Nafkom Brovary	24	12	6	6	28	18	+10	42	
5	FC Olimpik Donetsk	24	13	2	9	42	28	+14	41	
6	FC Yavir Krasnopilya	24	11	5	8	25	26	−1	38	
7	FC Hazovyk-KhGV Kharkiv	24	10	7	7	41	34	+7	37	
8	FC Hirnyk-Sport Komsomolsk	24	10	4	10	30	31	−1	34	
9	FC Kremin Kremenchuk	24	9	6	9	22	34	−12	33	
10	FC Arsenal Kharkiv	24	9	3	12	35	44	−9	30	(Note: FC Arsenal Kharkiv entered a new team with new management.)
11	FC Shakhtar-3 Donetsk	24	8	2	14	32	38	−6	26	
12	MFC Oleksandria	24	4	2	18	20	37	−17	14	Withdrew (Note: MFC Oleksandria withdrew from the competition after Round 23 when after the city elections of Oleksandria the city administration was unable to budget funds for the team and terminated financial support. (June 7th, 2006) All games after this date were considered Technical losses.)
13	FC Kharkiv-2	24	0	3	21	12	60	−48	3	Withdrew (Note: FC Kharkiv-2 completed the season. The main club FC Kharkiv consolidated their reserve and junior club to play in the reserves competition in the next season.)

(C) Champions; (P) Promoted

=== Cup competitions ===
==== Ukrainian Cup ====
2 May 2006
17:00 LST

Dynamo Kyiv	1–0	Metalurh Zaporizhzhia
Kléber 47'	Report

NSC Olimpiyskiy, Kyiv
Attendance: 25,000
Referee: Lucílio Batista (Portugal)

==== Super Cup ====
9 July 2005
20:45 EEST

Dynamo Kyiv	1–1	Shakhtar Donetsk
Byalkevich 32'	Report	Elano 5'
Penalties
Aliyev (penalty scored); Sablić (penalty missed); Gavrančić (penalty scored); Husiev (penalty scored); Shatskikh (penalty missed)	3–4	(penalty scored) Jádson; (penalty scored) Raț; (penalty scored) Tymoshchuk; (penalty scored) Stoican; (penalty missed) Srna

Central Stadium "Chornomorets", Odesa
Attendance: 34,400
Referee: Ihor Podushkin (Kharkiv)

== Women's club football ==
League	Promoted to league	Relegated from league
Higher League	Voskhod Stara Maiachka	~~Lehenda-ShVSM Chernihiv~~; Ateks SDIuShOR-16 Kyiv

Note: For all scratched clubs, see section Clubs removed for more details

=== Higher League ===
2006 Vyshcha Liha (women)
