= Oleksandr Kachorenko =

Ukrainian footballer (born 1980)

Personal information
- Date of birth: 26 August 1980 (age 46)
- Place of birth: Kharkiv, Soviet Union
- Height: 1.84 m (6 ft 0 in)
- Position: Goalkeeper

Senior career*
Years	Team	Apps	(Gls)
1998–2004	Metalist Kharkiv	16	(0)
1998–2004	→ Metalist-2 Kharkiv	72	(0)
2005–2011	Helios Kharkiv	173	(0)
2012	Shakhtar Sverdlovsk	5	(0)
- * Club domestic league appearances and goals

Oleksandr Kachorenko (Ukrainian: Олександр Віталійович Качоренко; born 26 August 1980) is a Ukrainian former professional footballer.

== Career ==
He started his career for Metalist Kharkiv and played there from 1997 to 2004 when he was traded to Helios Kharkiv and became the starting goalkeeper.
