= Volodymyr Matsuta =

Ukrainian footballer (born 1975)

Personal information
- Full name: Volodymyr Mykhaylovych Matsuta
- Date of birth: 2 April 1975 (age 51)
- Place of birth: Chernihiv, Ukrainian SSR
- Height: 1.84 m (6 ft 0 in)
- Position: Midfielder

Senior career*
Years	Team	Apps	(Gls)
1994–1995	Cheksyl Chernihiv	12	(0)
1997–1998	Domobudivnyk Chernihiv	2	(0)
1998–1999	Desna Chernihiv	18	(0)
1998–1999	Domobudivnyk Chernihiv	5	(0)
1998–1999	Fortuna Cheksyl Chernihiv	8	(19)
1999–2000	Desna Chernihiv	13	(0)
1999–2000	Rihonda Bila Tserkva	3	(0)
2001	Fakel Varva	13	(1)
2001–2002	Enerhiya Chernihiv	6	(0)
2002–2003	Fakel Varva	27	(6)
2004	Nizhyn	8	(0)
2005–2006	Polissya Dobryanka	1	(0)
2006–2008	Nizhyn	2	(0)
2008–2009	Desna-2 Chernihiv	22	(6)
2009–2011	Yednist-2 Plysky	25	(6)
2012	ATK Chernihiv	15	(1)

Managerial career
- 2020–: Desna Chernihiv (youth)
- * Club domestic league appearances and goals as of 31 October 2025

Volodymyr Mykhaylovych Matsuta (Ukrainian: Володимир Михайлович Мацута; born 2 April 1975) is a Ukrainian retired footballer.

== Playing career ==
Vladimir Matsuta started his career with hometown club Cheksyl Chernihiv. Then he played 2 matches with Domobudivnyk Chernihiv. In 1998 he moved to Desna Chernihiv where he played 18 matches, 4 matches with Domobudivnyk Chernihiv and 18 matches with Fortuna Cheksyl Chernihiv scoring 19 goals. In 1999 he moved to Desna Chernihiv where he played 13 matches and then he moved to Ros Bila Tserkva where he played 3 matches. In 2001 played 6 matches with Enerhiya Chernihiv and then he moved to Fakel Varva until 2003 where he played 27 matches and scored 6 goals and he won the Chernihiv Oblast Championship. In 2004 he played 8 matches with FC Nizhyn and then in 2008 he moved to Desna-2 Chernihiv, the reserve squad of Desna Chernihiv, here he played 22 matches and scored 6 goals. In 2009 he moved to Yednist-2 Plysky for three seasons where he played 25 matches and scored 6 goals. In 2012 he played 15 matches and scored 1 goal for ATK Chernihiv.

== Coaching career ==
He has been appointed as SDYuShOR Desna, the young team of Desna Chernihiv.

== Personal life ==
In 2022, his house was sheltered and destroyed by the Russian Armed Forces during the Siege of Chernihiv of the Russian invasion of Ukraine. On 12 March 2022, together with Artem Padun, Valentyn Krukovets, Volodymyr Chulanov and Oleksandr Babor, Volodymyr organized a charity tournament at the Chernihiv Stadium to raise funds for the reconstruction of his house.

== Honours ==
Nizhyn

- Chernihiv Oblast Championship: 2004

Fakel Varva

- Chernihiv Oblast Championship: 2001
