= Volodymyr Yemets =

Soviet footballer and manager

Personal information
- Full name: Volodymyr Oleksandrovych Yemets
- Date of birth: 3 April 1937
- Place of birth: Nikopol, Ukrainian SSR
- Date of death: 9 November 1987 (aged 50)
- Place of death: Kishinev, Moldavian SSR
- Position: Defender

Senior career*
Years	Team	Apps	(Gls)
1956	Metalurh Dnipropetrovsk	4	(0)
1956–1964	Trubnik Nikopol	33	(4)

Managerial career
- 1965: Trubnik Nikopol (assistant)
- 1966–1970: Trubnik Nikopol
- 1971–1981: Kolos Nikopol
- 1981–1986: Dnipro Dnipropetrovsk
- 1987: Nistru Chișinău
- * Club domestic league appearances and goals

Volodymyr Oleksandrovych Yemets (Ukrainian: Володимир Олександрович Ємець; 3 April 1937 – 9 November 1987) was a Ukrainian footballer and manager.
