= Denys Volk-Karachevskyi =

Ukrainian footballer

Personal information
- Full name: Denys Serhiyovych Volk-Karachevskyi
- Date of birth: 24 August 1979 (age 47)
- Place of birth: Yalta, Ukrainian SSR, USSR
- Height: 1.84 m (6 ft 0 in)
- Position: Defender

Senior career*
Years	Team	Apps	(Gls)
1996–1997	Dynamo Saky	5	(0)
1997–1999	Tavriya Simferopol	9	(0)
2000–2002	Sokil Zolochiv	47	(3)
2002–2003	Desna Chernihiv	1	(0)
2002–2003	Sokil Zolochiv	18	(2)
2003–2004	Elektrometalurh-NZF	28	(6)
2004–2005	Krymteplytsia	23	(0)
2005–2006	Oleksandriya	11	(0)
2005–2006	Enerhiya Yuzhnoukrainsk	13	(3)
2006–2007	Hirnyk Kryvyi Rih	10	(0)
2006–2007	Enerhiya Yuzhnoukrainsk	14	(0)
2007–2008	Hirnyk Kryvyi Rih	12	(0)
- * Club domestic league appearances and goals as of 1 January 2022

Denys Serhiyovych Volk-Karachevskyi (Ukrainian: Денис Сергійович Волк-Карачевський) is a Ukrainian retired footballer.

== Career ==
Denys Volk-Karachevsky started playing in professional clubs in early 1997 in the second league team Dynamo with Sack. At the beginning of the 1997–1998 season, the footballer received an invitation to the team of the top Ukrainian league Tavriya Simferopol with Simferopol. Volk-Karachevsky played for the team for a year and a half, during which he played 9 matches of the Ukrainian championship and 1 match in Cup of Ukraine. In early 1999, the footballer briefly returned to his hometown, where he played for the amateur team "Chernomorets". In the 1999–2000 season, Denis Volk-Karachevsky began playing in the amateur team "Falcon" from Zolocheva. The team started the next season in the second league, and according to the results of the 2001–2002 season, it won a ticket to the first league. Volk-Karachevsky spent one season in the first league as a member of the Sokil Zolochiv team. for which he played 18 matches. and he played another match as part of the second league farm club Sokil Zolochiv. In the 2003–2004 season, the footballer played in the second league team Elektrometalurh-NZF, and in the 2004–2005 season as part of another second-league team "Crimean Greenhouse". In the second half of 2005, Volk-Karachevsky played in the second league team Oleksandriya, and spent 2006 as part of the second league team "Energy" with South Ukrainian. In 2007, Denis Volk-Karachevsky played in another team of the second league "Miner" with Krivoy Rog. In the future, the player played only in amateur teams, the most famous of which are Mir (Gornostayivka), Crystal (Kherson) and Elektrometalurh-NZF. Since 2012, the footballer played for the second time in his career in an amateur team from his hometown "Chernomorets".
