= Dmytro Lelyuk =

Soviet footballer and Ukrainian coach

Personal information
- Full name: Dmytro Valeriyovych Lelyuk
- Date of birth: 8 January 1974 (age 52)
- Place of birth: Vuhlehirsk, Ukrainian SSR
- Height: 1.84 m (6 ft 0 in)
- Position: Defender

Youth career
- DYuSSh Bershad

Senior career*
Years	Team	Apps	(Gls)
- Temp Vinnytsia
1994–1995	Duumvirat Vinnytsia		
1995–1998	Nyva Vinnytsia	26	(0)
1996–1997	→ Nyva Bershad	7	(0)
1997–1998	→ Nyva-2 Vinnytsia	7	(0)
1997–1999	Polissya Zhytomyr	28	(1)
1998–2002	Vinnytsia	104	(2)
2002–2003	Kryvbas Kryvyi Rih	0	(0)
2002–2003	Desna Chernihiv	12	(1)
2002–2003	Sokil Zolochiv	4	(0)
2002–2003	Elektrometalurh-NZF Nikopol	9	(0)
2002–2003	Olkom Melitopol	9	(0)
2004	Lokomotiv Chita	29	(0)
2005–2006	Dnipro Cherkasy	36	(1)
2007	Berdychiv		
2007	O.L.KAR Sharhorod	11	(1)
2008	Horyzont Koziatyn	2	(0)
2010	Sharhorod	7	(1)
2011	Nyva Bershad	6	(1)
- * Club domestic league appearances and goals as of 29 November 2021

Dmytro Valeriyovych Lelyuk (Ukrainian: Дмитро Валерійович Лелюк; born 8 January 1974) is a Ukrainian retired professional footballer who played as a defender.

== Career ==
=== Nyva Vinnytsia ===
Dmytro Lelyuk started his career in 1994 at Nyva Vinnytsia and staying there until 1998, playing 26 games. In 1996 played also 3 matches with Nyva-2 Vinnytsia.

=== Polissya Zhytomyr ===
In 1997 he moved to Polissya Zhytomyr where he played 20 matches and scored 1 goal.

=== Vinnytsia ===
In 1998 he returned to Vinnytsia until 2002 where he played 104 and scored 2 goals.

=== Desna Chernihiv ===
In 2002 he moved Desna Chernihiv the main club of the city of Chernihiv, where he played 12 matches and scored 1 goal.

=== Elektrometalurh-NZF Nikopol and Olkom Melitopol ===
In the same season he played 9 matches for Elektrometalurh-NZF Nikopol and also for Olkom Melitopol.

=== Lokomotiv Chita ===
In 2004 he moved to Russia and signed for Lokomotiv Chita where he played 29 matches.

== Honours ==
Nyva Vinnytsia

- Ukrainian Cup runner-up: 1995–96
