= Oleksandr Kozhemyachenko =

Ukrainian footballer and coach

Personal information
- Full name: Oleksandr Viktorovych Kozhemyachenko
- Date of birth: 29 December 1978 (age 47)
- Position: Striker

Youth career
- Avanhard Koriukivka

Senior career*
Years	Team	Apps	(Gls)
1998–2002	Desna Chernihiv	85	(31)
2002–2003	Sokil Zolochiv	2	(0)
2002–2012	Desna Chernihiv	210	(75)
2012–2017	Avanhard Koriukivka	89	(33)
- * Club domestic league appearances and goals

Oleksandr Viktorovych Kozhemyachenko (Ukrainian: Олександр Вікторович Кожем'яченко; born 29 December 1978) is a Ukrainian former professional footballer. He spent most of his career with Desna Chernihiv.

== Career ==
=== Desna Chernihiv ===
Kozhemyachenko started his career at Desna Chernihiv, where he played 85 games and scored 31 goals between 1998 and 2002. He made his debut on 3 May 1999.

After a brief spell away, he returned to Desna Chernihiv in 2002. He won the 2005–06 Ukrainian Second League with the club and won the league's golden boot with 21 goals. By the time he left Desna in 2012, he was the club's all-time leading scorer with 128 goals in all competitions.

=== Avangard Korukivka ===
In 2012, he moved to Avangard Korukivka, where he won Chernihiv Oblast Football Championship and the Chernihiv Oblast Football Cup in 2013.

== Honours ==
Desna Chernihiv

- Ukrainian Second League: 2005–06

FC Avanhard Koriukivka

- Chernihiv Oblast Football Championship: 2013
- Chernihiv Oblast Football Cup: 2013

Individual

- Top Scorer Ukrainian Second League: 2010–11 (12 goals)
- Top Scorer Ukrainian Second League: 2004–05 (20 goals)
- Top Scorer Ukrainian Second League: 2005–06 (21 goals)
- Desna Chernihiv Player of the Year: (4) 2004, 2005, 2006, 2011
