= Artem Padun =

Ukrainian footballer (born 1983)

Personal information
- Full name: Artem Vasylyovych Padun
- Date of birth: 2 August 1983 (age 43)
- Place of birth: Chernihiv, Ukrainian SSR
- Height: 1.93 m (6 ft 4 in)
- Position: Goalkeeper

Youth career
- 2000: Desna Chernihiv

Senior career*
Years	Team	Apps	(Gls)
2000–2002	Desna Chernihiv	1	(0)
2004	Polissya Dobryanka	2	(0)
2006	Avanhard Koryukivka	2	(0)
2007–2008	Arsenal Bila Tserkva	2	(0)
2008	Polissya Dobryanka	2	(0)
2008–2009	Arsenal Bila Tserkva	0	(0)
2009	Polissya Dobryanka	2	(0)
2009–2010	Desna Chernihiv	0	(0)
2011–2021	Avanhard Koryukivka	68	(0)
2021–2023	Chernihiv	0	(0)

Managerial career
- 2015: Avanhard Koryukivka
- 2016: SDYuShOR Desna Chernihiv
- 2020–: Chernihiv (goalkeeping coach)
- 2026–: Chernihiv (assistant coach)
- * Club domestic league appearances and goals as of 16 February 2022

Artem Vasylyovych Padun (Ukrainian: Артем Васильович Падун; born 2 August 1983) is a Ukrainian retired professional footballer who played as a goalkeeper.

== Playing career ==
He started his career in 2000 with Desna Chernihiv. Between 2007 and 2008, he played nine matches for Arsenal-Kyivshchyna Bila Tserkva, and in summer 2009, moved back to Desna Chernihiv. Two years later, he moved to Avangard Korukivka, where he played 64 matches and won the Chernihiv Oblast Football Championship twice and the Chernihiv Oblast Football Cup once. In summer 2021, he moved to rival club FC Chernihiv in the Ukrainian Second League.

== Coaching career ==
In 2015, he was appointed as coach of Avanhard Koryukivka before moving on to SDYuShOR Desna later in the year. In 2020 he became the goalkeeping coach of FC Chernihiv. In 2021 together with Mykhailo Yarmoshenko he also joined the club's technical staff. On 25 August he was appointed Assistant Coach of FC Chernihiv.

== Philanthropy ==
On 12 June 2022, together with Valentyn Krukovets, Volodymyr Chulanov, Oleksandr Babor, he organized a charity tournament at Chernihiv Stadium to raise money to reconstruct the house of Volodymyr Matsuta which was destroyed by Russian troops during the Siege of Chernihiv.

== Career statistics ==
=== Club ===
As of match played 30 August 2022

Appearances and goals by club, season and competition
Club	Season	League			Cup		Europe		Other		Total	
Club	Season	Division	Apps	Goals	Apps	Goals	Apps	Goals	Apps	Goals	Apps	Goals
Desna Chernihiv	2000–01	Ukrainian Second League	1	0	0	0	0	0	0	0	1	0
Desna Chernihiv	2001–02	Ukrainian Second League	0	0	0	0	0	0	0	0	0	0
Desna Chernihiv	Total		1	0	0	0	0	0	0	0	1	0
Polissya Dobryanka	2004	Ukrainian Amateur League	2	0	0	0	0	0	0	0	2	0
Avangard Korukivka	2005	Ukrainian Amateur League	2	0	0	0	0	0	0	0	2	0
Arsenal Bila Tserkva	2007–08	Ukrainian Second League	2	0	0	0	0	0	0	0	2	0
Polissya Dobryanka	2008	Ukrainian Amateur League	2	0	0	0	0	0	0	0	2	0
Arsenal Bila Tserkva	2008–09	Ukrainian Second League	0	0	0	0	0	0	0	0	0	0
Polissya Dobryanka	2009	Ukrainian Amateur League	2	0	0	0	0	0	0	0	2	0
Desna Chernihiv	2009–10	Ukrainian Second League	0	0	0	0	0	0	0	0	0	0
Avangard Korukivka	2011	Ukrainian Amateur League	4	0	0	0	0	0	0	0	4	0
Avangard Korukivka	2012	Ukrainian Amateur League	15	0	0	0	0	0	0	0	15	0
Avangard Korukivka	2013	Ukrainian Amateur League	12	0	0	0	0	0	0	0	12	0
Avangard Korukivka	2014	Ukrainian Amateur League	4	0	0	0	0	0	0	0	4	0
Avangard Korukivka	2015	Ukrainian Amateur League	0	0	0	0	0	0	0	0	0	0
Avangard Korukivka	2016	Ukrainian Amateur League	16	0	0	0	0	0	0	0	16	0
Avangard Korukivka	2016–17	Ukrainian Amateur League	17	0	0	0	0	0	0	0	17	0
Avangard Korukivka	2017–18	Ukrainian Amateur League	0	0	0	0	0	0	0	0	0	0
Avangard Korukivka	2018–19	Ukrainian Amateur League	0	0	0	0	0	0	0	0	0	0
Avangard Korukivka	2019–20	Ukrainian Amateur League	0	0	0	0	0	0	0	0	0	0
Avangard Korukivka	2020–21	Ukrainian Amateur League	0	0	0	0	0	0	0	0	0	0
Avangard Korukivka	Total		68	0	0	0	0	0	0	0	68	0
Chernihiv	2021–22	Ukrainian Second League	0	0	0	0	0	0	0	0	0	0
Chernihiv	2022–23	Ukrainian First League	0	0	0	0	0	0	0	0	0	0
Career total			79	0	0	0	0	0	0	0	79	0

== Honours ==
FC Avanhard Kriukivka

- Chernihiv Oblast Football Championship: 2012, 2013
- Chernihiv Oblast Football Cup 2013

Arsenal-Kyivshchyna Bila Tserkva

- Ukrainian Second League: 2008–09
