= Oleksiy Shubin =

Ukrainian footballer (1975–2025)

Personal information
- Date of birth: 5 April 1975
- Place of birth: Ukrainian SSR, USSR
- Date of death: c. 7 March 2025 (aged 49)
- Place of death: Lyptsi, Kharkiv Oblast, Ukraine
- Height: 1.84 m (6 ft 0 in)
- Position: Defender

Youth career
- 1992–1993: Shahtar Pavlohrad

Senior career*
Years	Team	Apps	(Gls)
1992–1993	Shahtar Pavlohrad	0	(0)
1993–1995	Vedrich Rechitsa	29	(0)
1995–1998	Torpedo Zaporizhzhia	61	(2)
1998	Metalurg Nikopol	13	(2)
1999–2001	Cherkasy	76	(0)
2002	Naftovyk Okhtyrka	21	(0)
2003	Elektrometalurh-NZF Nikopol	9	(1)
2004	Desna Chernihiv	8	(0)
- * Club domestic league appearances and goals

Oleksiy Shubin (Ukrainian: Олексій Вікторович Шубін; 5 April 1975 – c. 7 March 2025) was a Ukrainian footballer. Shubin was killed in action in March 2025 during the Russo-Ukrainian War.

== Career ==
Oleksiy Shubin, started his career with Rechitsa-2014 in 1993 in Belarus, where he played 14 matches and then 15 matches in 1994. In 1995, he moved to Torpedo Zaporizhzhia where he stayed until 1998 where he played 60 matches. In 1998, he moved to FC Cherkasy playing 14 matches and 13 matches with Metalurg Nikopol. In 1999, he returned to FC Cherkasy until 2001, playing 51 matches, before moving to Naftovyk Okhtyrka, where he played 11 matches. In 2004 he moved to Desna Chernihivl, the club in the city of Chernihiv where he played 9 matches and managed to play 12 matches and got second place in Ukrainian Second League in the season 2004–05.

== Death ==
Shubin joined the Ukrainian army during the Russo-Ukrainian War. He was killed during a combat mission near Lyptsi, by an FPV drone strike. Shubin's death was reported on 7 March 2025. He was 49 years old.

== Honours ==
Desna Chernihiv

- Ukrainian Second League: Runner-Up 2004–05

== See also ==
- List of Ukrainian sports figures killed during the Russo-Ukrainian war
