= Oleksandr Dmytruk =

Soviet footballer and Ukrainian coach

Personal information
- Date of birth: 16 July 1980 (age 46)
- Place of birth: Ukrainian SSR, USSR
- Height: 1.77 m (5 ft 10 in)
- Position: Midfielder

Senior career*
Years	Team	Apps	(Gls)
1998	Veres Rovno	22	(0)
1999–2005	Borysfen Boryspil	154	(16)
2000	→ Rihonda Bila Tserkva (loan)	6	(1)
2002–2003	→ Borisfen-2 Boryspil	9	(2)
2003	→ Desna Chernihiv (loan)	2	(1)
2004	→ Boreks-Borysfen Borodianka (loan)	7	(0)
2006	Obolon Kyiv	4	(0)
2007	Ros Bila Tserkva	6	(0)
- * Club domestic league appearances and goals as of 2 January 2022

Oleksandr Dmytruk (Ukrainian: Дмитрук Александр Николаевич; born 16 July 1980) is a Ukrainian retired footballer.

== Career ==
Oleksandr Dmytruk started his career in 1997 with Veres Rovno and Borysfen Boryspil. He played also for Borysfen Boryspil, Ros Bila Tserkva, Borisfen-2 Boryspil. In 2003 he moved to Desna Chernihiv the main club in Chernihiv, where he played 2 games and scored 1 goal. Then he moved to Boreks-Borysfen and Borisfen-2 Boryspil in the same season. In summer 2004 he moved back to Borysfen Boryspil where he played 29 matches and scored 1 goal and in 2005 he moved to Obolon Kyiv, where he played 4 matches.
