= Oleh Syzon =

Soviet footballer and Ukrainian coach

Personal information
- Full name: Сизон Олег Фёдорович
- Date of birth: 1 February 1977 (age 49)
- Place of birth: Ukrainian SSR, USSR
- Height: 1.84 m (6 ft 1/2 in)
- Position: Defender

Senior career*
| Years | Team | Apps | (Gls) |
| 1993–1994 | Olimpik Kyiv | 21 | (0) |
| 1995 | Kryvbas Kryvyi Rih | 2 | (0) |
| 1995 | Kakhovka | 15 | (3) |
| 1996–1997 | Slovianets Konotop | 15 | (1) |
| 1997 | Borysfen Boryspil | 15 | (2) |
| 1998 | Metalurh Mariupol | 9 | (1) |
| 1998 | Borysfen Boryspil | 12 | (1) |
| 1999 | Metalurh Mariupol | 7 | (0) |
| 2000–2004 | Borysfen Boryspil | 71 | (0) |
| 2001–2003 | → Borysfen-2 Boryspil | 7 | (0) |
| 2002 | → FC Yevropa Pryluky (loan) | 19 | (1) |
| 2003–2004 | → Desna Chernihiv (loan) | 9 | (0) |
| 2004 | → Boreks-Borysfen Borodianka | 9 | (0) |
| 2005 | Spartak Sumy | 29 | (0) |
| 2006 | Shakhtar Konotop | 3 | (0) |
- * Club domestic league appearances and goals

Oleh Syzon (Ukrainian: Сизон Олег Фёдорович; born 1 February 1977) is a retired Ukrainian footballer who played from 1993 to 2006.

== Career ==
Syzon was born in Konotop, Sumy Oblast, and attended the Kyiv Regional Military University of Physical Culture.

=== 1995 and 1996 ===
In 1995, he signed a professional contract with FC Kryvbas Kryvyi Rih. Syzon made his debut in an April 30, 1995 match against Kremin Kremenchuk in the 89th minute, replacing Vladislav Maltsev. He played two matches in the Ukrainian Premier League in 1994–95 with the club.

Syzon made his Ukrainian Cup debut against eventual winners FC Chornomorets Odesa, playing the entire match. He scored his first professional goal that year against Desna Chernihiv.

In the first half of the 1995–96 season, Syzon played 15 matches (scoring three goals) and one Ukrainian Cup match. As an amateur, he played 15 matches and scored one goal.

=== 1997 ===
In 1997, Syzon moved to Borysfen Boryspil. Debuting on July 14, 1997, he scored his first goal with the new team on the 67th day. Syzon played on December 31, 1997, in the first round of Group A against Mykolaiv, and played in the eighth round of Group A against Tysmenytsia. In the first half of the 1997–98 season, he won 15 regular-season matches (scoring two goals) and two more matches (scoring one goal) in the Ukrainian Cup. Syzon moved to FC Metalurh Donetsk, making his debut on April 1, 1998, in the Ukrainian Cup quarterfinal against Dynamo Kyiv.

=== 1998 and 1999 ===
He returned to Borysfen Boryspil before the start of the 1998–99 season, winning 12 matches and scoring one goal.

=== 2000s ===
In the spring of 2000, Borysfen Boryspil was promoted from the Ukrainian First League to the Ukrainian Premier League. Syzon played for Borysfen-2 Boryspil, its farm team, from 2001 to 2003. In the 2003–04 season, he played in nine matches and scored one goal for Desna Chernihiv. In 2006, Syzon won three matches in the amateur championship of Ukraine.
