= Oleksandr Honchar (footballer) =

Soviet footballer and Ukrainian coach

Personal information
- Full name: Oleksandr Borysovych Honchar
- Date of birth: February 25, 1980
- Place of birth: Shchaslyve, Ukrainian SSR, USSR
- Date of death: August 16, 2023 (aged 43)
- Place of death: Zaporizhzhia Oblast, Ukraine
- Height: 1.84 m (6 ft 0 in)
- Position: Midfielder

Senior career*
Years	Team	Apps	(Gls)
1997–2000	Borysfen Boryspil	81	(6)
2000	→ Prykarpattia Ivano-Frankivsk (loan)	15	(0)
2001–2002	Vorskla Poltava	18	(2)
2001–2002	→ Vorskla-2 Poltava	28	(0)
2002–2005	Borysfen Boryspil	75	(2)
2003–2004	→ Desna Chernihiv (loan)	4	(0)
2004	→ Boreks-Borysfen Borodianka	2	(1)
2005	Metalist Kharkiv	10	(0)
2006	Zorya Luhansk	9	(0)
2007	Knyazha Shchaslyve	8	(0)
2007–2008	Oleksandriya	24	(0)
2008	Poltava	16	(1)
2009	Nafkom Brovary	7	(1)
2009	Nyva Ternopil	21	(0)
- * Club domestic league appearances and goals

Oleksandr Borysovych Honchar (Ukrainian: Олександр Борисович Гончар) was a Ukrainian footballer.

== Career ==
Oleksandr Honchar was a pupil of Boryspil football. Honchar's first professional club was Borysfen Boryspil, for which he made his debut on July 31, 1997, in the first game after the team returned to the second league. For the next three seasons he was a player of the main team of Boryspil.

In the spring of 2000, Honchar transferred to the Ivano-Frankivsk Prykarpattia Premier League. There, his performances were noticed by the coaches of the youth team, and he was called to its meeting. However, as a member of the youth team, the player did not enter the field. In the summer, Prykarpattia flew to the first league, Borysfen Boryspil left the second league to the first, and Honchar returned to Borysfen Boryspil.

In the winter off-season of 2000/2001, Honchar transferred to Vorskla. In the Poltava club he immediately became a regular player, but in the spring of 2002 he stopped getting into the starting lineup, playing for the double. In the summer of the same year, the footballer returned to Borisfen for the third time in his career. It was at this time that Borysfen Boryspil achieved the greatest success in its history, having spent two seasons in the major leagues, Honchar was the main player of that team.

After Borisfen was relegated to the first division in 2005, Gonchar joined Metalist Kharkiv. In the winter off-season, the club decided to terminate the player's contract, and Honchar moved to Luhansk's Zorya, with which he reached the top league. In the major leagues, Honchar did not play, having played only 5 games per double, in addition, the club had significant financial problems, and Honchar left the team.

The player spent the second half of the 2007/2008 season in the second league Knyazha from his native Shchaslyve. The following season, Honchar played in the first league for Oleksandriya, and since the summer of 2008 he played for Poltava. In February 2009, Honchar was under review at the Uzbekistan Premier League club Kyzylkum (Zarafshan), but he did not join the Uzbek team, remaining in Ukraine. Honchar spent the spring part of the season at the Nafkom Brovary in Brovary, where he was the team's vice-captain. In July 2009 he moved to Nyva Ternopil, for which he played in the first league.

In 2023, he was killed in Zaporizhzhia while serving as part of an automobile brigade of the Airborne Assault Troops of the Armed Forces of Ukraine during the Russian invasion of Ukraine.

== Honours ==
Zorya Luhansk

- Ukrainian First League: 2005–06

Borysfen Boryspil

- Ukrainian First League: 2002–03
- Ukrainian Second League: 1999–2000

== See also ==
- List of Ukrainian sports figures killed during the Russo-Ukrainian war
