= Serhiy Shpak =

Ukrainian footballer

Personal information
- Full name: Шпак Сергей Фёдорович
- Date of birth: 1 January 1984 (age 42)
- Place of birth: Ukrainian SSR, USSR
- Height: 1.84 m (6 ft 1/2 in)
- Position: Defender

Senior career*
| Years | Team | Apps | (Gls) |
| 2001 | FC Yavir-Volynlis Tsuman | | |
| 2002–2007 | Volyn Lutsk | 8 | (0) |
| 2002–2003 | → Kovel-Volyn-2 Kovel | 32 | (2) |
| 2004 | → Ikva Mlyniv (loan) | 12 | (1) |
| 2005 | → Mykolaiv (loan) | 12 | (0) |
| 2006 | → Desna Chernihiv (loan) | 1 | (0) |
| 2007 | Vodnyk Rivne | | |
| 2008 | Chełmianka Chełm | | |
| 2008 | Enerhetyk Burshtyn | 3 | (0) |
| 2009 | CSKA Kyiv | 5 | (0) |
| 2009 | ODEK Orzhiv | | |
| 2009–2010 | Chełmianka Chełm | | |
| 2011 | Jaro | 2 | (0) |
| 2011 | KPV | 6 | (0) |
| 2011 | Jakobstads BK | 12 | (2) |
- * Club domestic league appearances and goals

Serhiy Shpak (Ukrainian: Шубин Алексей Викторович; born 1 January 1984) is a retired Ukrainian footballer.

== Career ==
Serhiy Shpak is a pupil of Volyn Lutsk football. Played for Volyn Lutsk, Kovel-Volyn-2, Ikva Mlyniv, Chelmyanka (Chelm, Poland), Mykolaiv, Desna Chernihiv, Enerhetyk Burshtyn and CSKA Kyiv. As a Volyn Lutsk player, on 23 July 2005 he played the only match in Ukrainian Premier League. In this game against Arsenal Kiev, he entered the field in the 87th minute, replacing the Romanian legionnaire Constantin Schumacher. In the understudy tournament he played 33 matches for Volyn Lutsk, scored 1 goal. In January 2006 he moved to Desna Chernihiv, the main club in the city of Chernihiv, where he won the Ukrainian Second League in the season 2005–06. In 2009, while playing for CSKA Kyiv, he was injured, due to which he remained out of football for a whole year. After his recovery, the player's agent invited him to try his hand at the Finnish championship. Sergei agreed, went through the training camp and as a result signed a contract with the team of Veikkausliga "Yaro". In the club of Alexei Eremenko, Shpak played 8 matches in total in all tournaments and in the course of the season moved to the team of the lower division "KPV".

== Honours ==
Desna Chernihiv

- Ukrainian Second League: 2005–06
