= Volodymyr Chulanov =

Soviet footballer and Ukrainian coach

Personal information
- Full name: Volodymyr Viktorovych Chulanov
- Date of birth: 12 October 1985 (age 41)
- Place of birth: Chernihiv, Soviet Union, (now Ukraine)
- Height: 1.84 m (6 ft 0 in)
- Position: Defender

Youth career
- 1999—2003: SDYuShOR Desna

Senior career*
Years	Team	Apps	(Gls)
2005–2009	Desna Chernihiv	117	(2)
2009–2010	Sevastopol	8	(0)
2009–2010	Desna Chernihiv	8	(0)
2010–2011	Helios Kharkiv	3	(0)
2011–2016	Desna Chernihiv	91	(2)
- * Club domestic league appearances and goals as of 24 November 2021

Volodymyr Viktorovych Chulanov (Ukrainian: Володимир Вікторович Чуланов born 12 October 1985) is a Ukrainian retired football player.

== Career ==
He started his career with Desna Chernihiv and on 6 August 2005 he made his debut in the season 2005-06 in Ukrainian First League. With the club of Chernihiv he played until 2009, then in 2010 he moved to Sevastopol and Helios Kharkiv, where he played 8 and 3 matches. In 2011 he returned to Desna Chernihiv until 2016 where he played 91 games and scored 2 goals.

== Philanthropy ==
On 12 March 2022 together with Artem Padun, Valentyn Krukovets, Oleksandr Babor, they organized a charity tournament in Chernihiv Stadium in Chernihiv to organize a donation to reconstruct the house of the Volodymyr Matsuta which was destroyed by the Russian troops, during the Siege of Chernihiv.
