= Denys Anelikov =

Soviet footballer and Ukrainian coach

Personal information
- Full name: Анеликов Денис Викторович
- Date of birth: 10 February 1982 (age 44)
- Place of birth: Krasnokamsk, Russian SFSR
- Height: 1.84 m (6 ft 1/2 in)
- Position: Defender

Youth career
- 1998–1999: UOR Simferopol

Senior career*
Years	Team	Apps	(Gls)
2000–2003	Shakhtar-3 Donetsk	72	(1)
2001–2003	Shakhtar-2 Donetsk	21	(0)
2004	Desna Chernihiv	8	(0)
2004	Oleksandriya	8	(0)
2005	Ihroservice Simferopol	15	(0)
2005–2008	Dnipro Cherkasy	61	(2)
2008	Shakhtyor Soligorsk	3	(0)
2009–2010	Desna Chernihiv	29	(1)
2010	Lviv	2	(0)
2011–2012	Desna Chernihiv	48	(0)
- * Club domestic league appearances and goals

Denys Anelikov (Ukrainian: Анеликов Денис Викторович) is a Ukrainian former football player.

== Career ==
He attended the Simferopol Olympic Reserve School. From 2000 to 2003, he played in the second and third teams of Shakhtar Donetsk. In the second half of the 2003/04 season he played for Desna Chernihiv, later he was a player at Oleksandriya and Ihroservice Simferopol from Simferopol.

Since 2006, he has played for Oleksandr Ryabokon's Dnipro Cherkasy for almost three seasons. In 2008 he moved to the Belarusian club Shakhtyor Soligorsk. The first match in the group of opportunities on March 29, 2008 in the 1/4 finals of the Belarusian Cup against Darida (2: 1). In Belarusian Premier League, he made his debut on April 6 in the match with Torpedo-BelAZ Zhodino (1: 0).

In the match of the second round, Anelikov was injured and was replaced in the 16th minute, and the next time he entered the field only a month later. After that, he stopped getting into the main team and played for the backup. In total, he played 12 matches in the understudy tournament and scored two goals.

On July 7, 2008 he took part in the match of the second round of the Intertoto Cup against the Austrian "Sturm" (0: 2). In August, Denis Anelikov played for the double, suffered a fracture of his left leg and did not play again until the end of the season.

In the summer of 2009, he attended a screening at Metalurh Zaporizhzhia. At the beginning of the 2009/10 season, he moved to Desna Chernihiv, whose coach was Oleksandr Ryabokon, who Anelikov knew from Dnipro Cherkasy. During the winter break, I was seen in the Akhtyrka "Oilman", but returned to Desna Chernihiv. He took part in the Makarov Winter Memorial, where the team reached the final.

After the end of the season, Desna Chernihiv lost its professional status and Anelikov, like the head coach, moved to FC Lviv, where he only came out twice as a substitute. In the second half of the 2010/11 season he returned to Desna Chernihiv.

Between 2014 and 2018 he played for amateur clubs in Crimea.
