= Anatoliy Sanin =

Ukrainian footballer

Anatolii Sanin
Personal information
- Date of birth: 12 August 1990 (age 36)
- Place of birth: Kharkiv, Ukrainian SSR, USSR
- Height: 1.84 m (6 ft 1/2 in)
- Position: Defender

Senior career*
Years	Team	Apps	(Gls)
1998–2001	Metalist Kharkiv	0	(0)
1998–2001	→ Metalist-2 Kharkiv	50	(3)
2002	Zirka Kirovohrad	15	(0)
2002–2005	Metalist Kharkiv	12	(0)
2002–2005	→ Metalist-2 Kharkiv	13	(0)
2004	→ Desna Chernihiv (loan)	1	(0)
2005	Zorya Luhansk	2	(0)
2006	YPA	1	(0)
2008	Sevastopol	8	(0)
- * Club domestic league appearances and goals as of 25 December 2021

Anatolii Anatoliiovych Sanin (Ukrainian: Анатолій Анатолійович Санін; born 12 August 1990) is a Ukrainian retired footballer.

== Career ==
Anatoly Sanin, started his career with Metalist-2 Kharkiv in 1998 until 2001 and he moved to Metalist Kharkiv and Zirka Kropyvnytskyi. In 2003 he moved to Metalist Kharkiv, where he won the Ukrainian First League in the season 2003–04 and promoted to the Ukrainian Premier League. In 2004 he moved to Desna Chernihiv, the club in the city of Chernihiv where he managed to get second place in Ukrainian Second League in the season 2004–05. In 2004, he moved back to Metalist-2 Kharkiv and in 2005 he played 2 matches with Zorya Luhansk where he contributed to with the Ukrainian First League in the season 2005–06. In 2006 he moved to Finland with YPA where he played only 1 match. In 2007 until 2008 he played 8 match with Sevastopol.

== Honours ==
Zorya Luhansk

- Ukrainian First League: 2005–06

Metalist Kharkiv

- Ukrainian First League: 2003–04
