= Serhiy Shurkhal =

Ukrainian footballer

Personal information
- Date of birth: 29 January 1980 (age 46)
- Place of birth: Chernihiv, Ukrainian SSR, USSR
- Height: 1.84 m (6 ft 0 in)
- Position: Midfielder

Youth career
- 1999: Desna Chernihiv

Senior career*
Years	Team	Apps	(Gls)
1999–2000	Desna Chernihiv	9	(0)
2001	Yevropa Pryluky	5	(0)
2001–2002	Kherson	5	(0)
2002–2003	Desna Chernihiv	7	(0)
2002–2003	Sokil Zolochiv	1	(0)
- * Club domestic league appearances and goals as of 30 January 2022

Serhiy Shurkhal (Ukrainian: Сергій Васильович Шурхал) is a retired Ukrainian professional footballer who played as a midfielder.

== Career ==
Serhiy Shurkhal, started his career with Avanhard Koryukivka and then in 1999 he moved to Desna Chernihiv the main club of Chernihiv. In 2001 he moved to Yevropa Pryluky where he played 5 matches, before playing 5 matches for Kherson. In summer 2002, he moved back to Desna Chernihiv in Ukrainian Second League where in the season 2002–03 he played 7 matches, where he managed to get third place. In January 2003, he moved to Sokil Zolochiv in the Ukrainian First League where he managed to play one match in the 2002–03 season.
