= Dmytro Kolodin =

Ukrainian footballer

Personal information
- Full name: Dmytro Viktorovych Kolodin
- Date of birth: 12 April 1978 (age 48)
- Place of birth: Kryvyi Rih, Ukrainian SSR, Soviet Union
- Height: 1.93 m (6 ft 4 in)
- Position: Attacking midfielder

Senior career*
Years	Team	Apps	(Gls)
1996–2001	Metalurh Zaporizhzhia	37	(2)
1998–1999	→ Metalurh-2 Zaporizhzhia	17	(2)
1999	→ Torpedo Zaporizhzhia (loan)	15	(1)
2000	→ Kryvbas Kryvyi Rih (loan)	3	(0)
2000	→ Kryvbas-2 Kryvyi Rih (loan)	24	(4)
2001	→ SSSOR-Metalurh Zaporizhzhia (loan)	12	(1)
2001	→ Elektrometalurh-NZF Nikopol (loan)	14	(0)
2002	Dinamo Minsk	7	(0)
2003–2004	Lokomotiv Vitebsk	56	(27)
2005–2007	Desna Chernihiv	83	(24)
2008	Smorgon	27	(8)
2008–2009	Dacia Chişinău	10	(0)
2009	Smorgon	12	(3)
2010	Qizilqum Zarafshon	3	(0)
2010	Naftan Novopolotsk	8	(0)
2011–2012	Mykolaiv	28	(4)
2012–2013	Zhemchuzhyna Yalta	21	(0)

Managerial career
- 2013–2015: Metalurh-2 Zaporizhzhia
- 2016: Inhulets Petrove
- * Club domestic league appearances and goals

Dmytro Viktorovych Kolodin (Ukrainian: Дмитро Вікторович Колодін; born 12 April 1978) is a former Ukrainian football midfielder.

== Career ==
Kolodin was born in Kryvyi Rih, Ukrainian SSR, Soviet Union. He began playing football with FC Metalurh Zaporizhzhia's youth side, and would eventually play professional football for the club from 1996 to 1999. He also played in the Ukrainian Premier League for FC Kryvbas Kryvyi Rih.

In 2002 Kolodin went to play in Belarus. He played for Dinamo Minsk and FC Lokomotiv Vitebsk. From 2005 to 2007 he played for Desna Chernihiv, the main team of Chernihiv, with which he took second place in the group of the second league, and here he won the Ukrainian Second League in the season 2005–06 and to get promoted to Ukrainian First League.

In 2008 he returned to Belarus. He played 27 matches for Smorgon, after which he accepted an offer from Dacia Chișinău. He began the 2009 season in Moldova, but returned to Smorgon after the team's financial situation deteriorated. He also spent the next season in two clubs: he started in Uzbekistan's Kyzylkum, and finished in Belarus' Naftan.

The last two years of his career he played in the Ukrainian teams Mykolaiv and Zhemchuzhyna Yalta.

== Honours ==
Desna Chernihiv

- Ukrainian Second League: 2005–06
