= Serhiy Hamal =

Ukrainian footballer

Personal information
- Full name: Serhiy Mykolayovych Hamal
- Date of birth: 22 August 1976 (age 50)
- Place of birth: Chernivtsi, Soviet Union (now Ukraine)
- Height: 1.84 m (6 ft 0 in)
- Position: Midfielder

Senior career*
Years	Team	Apps	(Gls)
1993	Lada Chernivtsi	11	(0)
1994	Bukovyna Chernivtsi	30	(0)
1995	Hirnyk Komsomolsk	4	(0)
1995–1996	CSKA / CSKA-2 Kyiv	30	(1)
1997–2001	Bukovyna Chernivtsi	144	(8)
2001	Cherkasy	15	(0)
2002–2003	Nafkom Brovary	35	(1)
2004	Bukovyna Chernivtsi	19	(0)
2005	Desna Chernihiv	24	(0)
2007	Luzhany	8	(0)
2007–2009	Bukovyna Chernivtsi	43	(0)
2009	Luzhany	11	(0)
- * Club domestic league appearances and goals

Serhiy Mykolayovych Hamal (Ukrainian: Сергій Миколайович Гамаль) is a Ukrainian retired footballer.

== Career ==
Serhiy Hamal is a pupil of the Chernivtsi Sports School Bukovyna Chernivtsi; he began his professional career in 1994 in his native Bukovyna Chernivtsi. He made his debut in the top league of Ukraine on March 12 of the same year in a match against Kryvbas Kryvyi Rih. In 1995 he was called up to serve in the armed forces of Ukraine, where he was sent to the central sports club of the army. At the end of his service life, Sergei returned to Bukovina.

In connection with the unsuccessful 2000/01 season, in which Bukovyna Chernivtsi took the last place in the first league, Hamal, like a number of other players, left his home club. He continued his career at the Nafkom Brovary, and in 2001 he played for the Cherkassy team. From 2003 to 2006 he played for his native Bukovyna Chernivtsi and January 2004 he moved to Desna Chernihiv, where he with the club of Chernihiv he won the Ukrainian Second League in the season 2005–06. In 2007, as a member of the Luzhany club, he became the bronze medalist of the amateur championship of Ukraine. After that, in the summer of 2007, he returned to his native team, where he played two seasons and ended his professional career as a player.

In 2017, already as a coach of a youth sports school, he got a job in the same Bukovyna Chernivtsi, namely, he helped the director of the school, Yuri Kraftruuk, with the coaching process. In December 2018, he entered the coaching staff of Vitaly Kunitsa, who had headed Bukovyna Chernivtsi the day before. Also, Sergei Nikolaevich simultaneously became the mentor of the youth team, which played in the all-Ukrainian junior league.

== Personal life ==
He is married, married to Oksana Hamal and has a daughter, Alexandra.

== Honours ==
Desna Chernihiv

- Ukrainian Second League: 2005–06

Nafkom Brovary

- Ukrainian Second League: 2002–03

Bukovyna Chernivtsi

- Ukrainian Second League: 1999–2000

CSKA Kyiv

- Ukrainian Second League: 1995–96
