= Artem Akhrameyev =

Soviet footballer and Ukrainian coach

Personal information
- Full name: Artem Yevhenovych Akhrameyev
- Date of birth: 5 April 1982 (age 44)
- Place of birth: Ukrainian SSR, USSR
- Height: 1.84 m (6 ft 0 in)
- Position: Defender

Youth career
- 1998–1999: Lokomotyv Kharkiv

Senior career*
| Years | Team | Apps | (Gls) |
| 1999–2003 | Metalist Kharkiv | 1 | (0) |
| 1999–2003 | → Metalist-2 Kharkiv | 87 | (2) |
| 2004 | Desna Chernihiv | 27 | (2) |
| 2005 | Hazovyk-KhGV Kharkiv | 9 | (0) |
| 2005–2006 | Arsenal Kharkiv | 12 | (2) |
| 2006 | Lokomotyv Dvorichna | 2 | (0) |
| 2006 | Stal Dniprodzerzhynsk | 1 | (0) |
| 2007 | YPA | 21 | (0) |
- * Club domestic league appearances and goals

Artem Yevhenovych Akhrameyev (Ukrainian: Артём Євгенович Ахрамеєв; born 5 April 1982) is a Ukrainian retired footballer.

== Career ==
Artem Akhrameyev started playing in 1999 until 2002 for Metalist-2 Kharkiv and Metalist Kharkiv. In summer 2002 he returned to Metalist-2 Kharkiv. In summer 2003 he moved to Desna Chernihiv in Chernihiv where he played 13 matches and scored 2 goals. In January 2004 he moved to Metalist-2 Kharkiv and Hazovyk-HGV. In summer 2004 he moved back to Desna Chernihiv where he played 14 matches and then he moved to Arsenal Kharkiv where he played 12 matches and scored 2 goals. In summer 2006 he moved Stal Kamianske and YPA in Finland.
