= Volodymyr Lutsenko =

Soviet footballer and Ukrainian coach

Personal information
- Date of birth: 17 February 1978 (age 48)
- Place of birth: Ukrainian SSR, USSR
- Height: 1.84 m (6 ft 0 in)
- Position: Defender

Senior career*
Years	Team	Apps	(Gls)
1996–1998	Podillya Khmelnytskyi	71	(4)
1999	Yesil-Bogatyr	13	(0)
2000	Podillya Khmelnytskyi	13	(4)
2000	Vinnytsia	14	(0)
2001–2002	Volyn Lutsk	39	(1)
2001–2002	→ Kovel-Volyn-2 Kovel	4	(0)
2003	Boreks-Borysfen Borodianka	27	(0)
2004	Mykolaiv	27	(0)
2005	Desna Chernihiv	4	(0)
2005	Khimik Krasnoperekopsk	13	(0)
2006	Krystal Kherson	13	(0)
2006–2008	Khimik Krasnoperekopsk	9	(0)
- * Club domestic league appearances and goals

Volodymyr Lutsenko (Ukrainian: Володимир Володимирович Луценко) is a Ukrainian retired footballer.

== Career ==
Volodymyr Lutsenko started playing in 1997 at Podillya Khmelnytskyi. In 1999, the Ukrainian coach Vladimir Strizhevsky, who previously worked in the Khmelnytsky team, headed the Petropavlovsk "Access-Esil" and invited Lutsenko to Kazakhstan. In the same year, with this team, the Ukrainians won silver medals in the championship. The following year, the footballer returned to Podillya Khmelnytskyi, and then in transit through Nyva Vinnytsia moved to Volyn Lutsk. In the first season with Lutsenko, the Lutsk team were ninth in the first league, and the next season they won the tournament hard.

On July 7, 2002, in the game against Dnipro, Vladimir made his debut in the top league, and in total, Lutsenko played 8 matches in the top division of Ukraine. Since 2003, he has played in the teams of the lower divisions: Boreks Borodianka, Mykolaiv, Desna Chernihiv, Krystal Kherson, Krystal Kherson.
