= Pavlo Shchedrakov =

Ukrainian footballer and manager (born 1985)

Pavlo Schedrakov
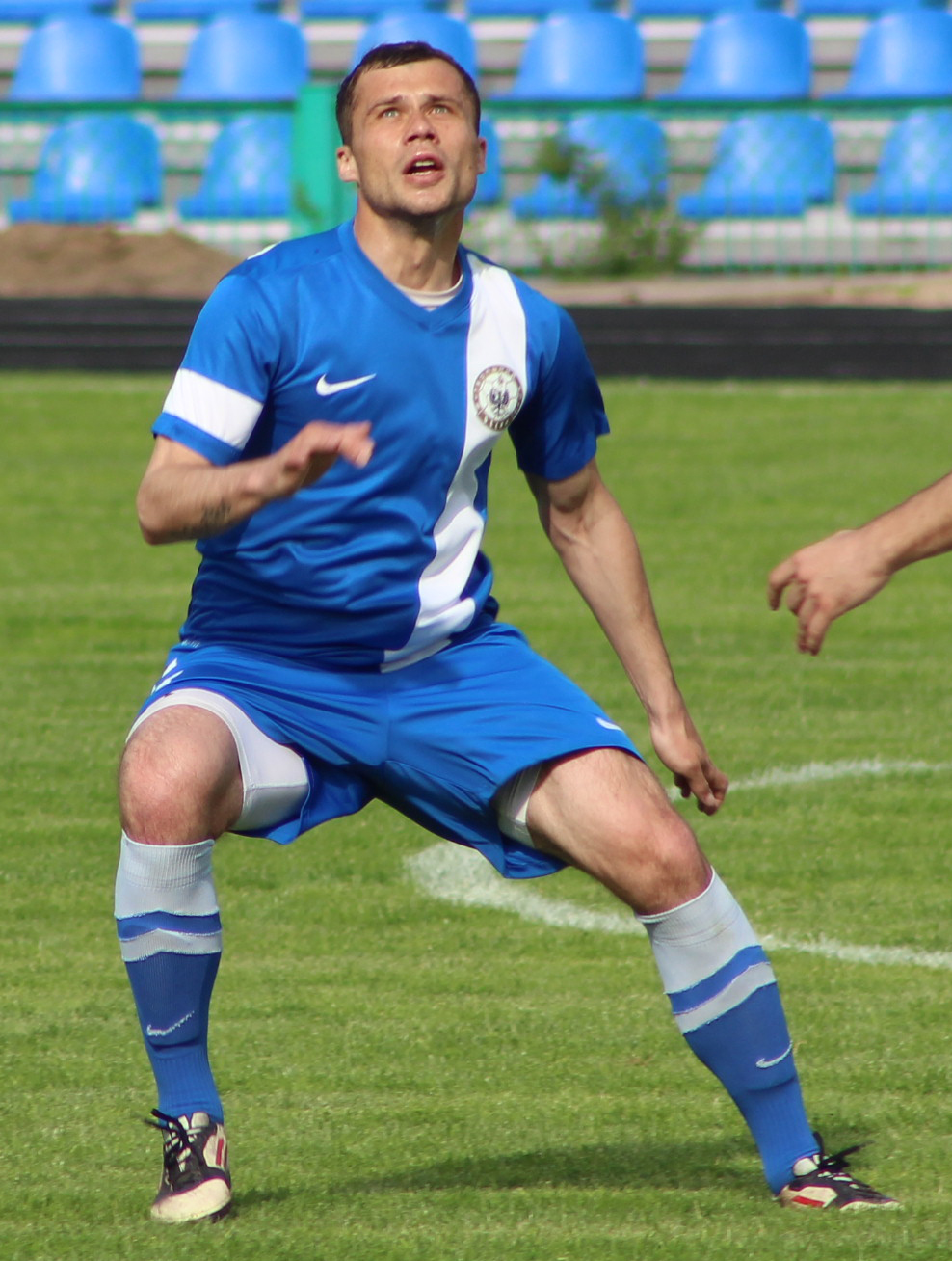

Personal information
- Full name: Pavlo Serhiyovych Schedrakov
- Date of birth: 17 January 1985 (age 41)
- Place of birth: Slavutych, Kyiv Oblast, Ukrainian SSR
- Height: 1.83 m (6 ft 0 in)
- Position: Defender

Youth career
- 1998–2002: Kaskad Slavutych

Senior career*
Years	Team	Apps	(Gls)
2004	Borysfen Boryspil	0	(0)
2004	→ Borysfen-2 Boryspil	10	(2)
2004	→ Systema-Boreks Borodianka (loan)	1	(0)
2005–2009	Desna Chernihiv	122	(5)
2009–2011	Krymteplytsia Molodizhne	55	(3)
2011–2013	Hoverla Uzhhorod	55	(1)
2013–2018	Desna Chernihiv	115	(2)
2018-2019	→ Polissya Zhytomyr (loan)	6	(0)
2019-2022	Kudrivka	5	(0)
2022	Fakel Lypovets	1	(0)
2022–2024	Kudrivka	10	(2)

Managerial career
- 2018–???: Desna Chernihiv (U21 assistant)
- 2024–: Kudrivka-Nyva (assistant)
- * Club domestic league appearances and goals as of 26 December 2024

Pavlo Schedrakov (Ukrainian: Павло Сергійович Щедраков; born 17 January 1985) is a Ukrainian retired footballer and current manager.

== Career ==
Schedrakov was born in the "atom-grad" Slavutych which is an exclave of Kyiv Oblast near the city of Chernihiv and was founded soon after the Chernobyl disaster.

Schedrakov is a product of the Kaskad Slavutych youth sportive school system. He spent his career in the Ukrainian football clubs of the different levels and also played one season in the Ukrainian Premier League with FC Hoverla Uzhhorod.

== Honours ==
Kudrivka

- Chernihiv Oblast Football Cup 2021
- Kyiv Oblast Football Federation: 2020
- Kyiv Oblast Football Cup: 2021

Desna Chernihiv

- Ukrainian First League: (1) 2017–18
- Ukrainian Second League: (2) 2005–06, 2012–13

Hoverla Uzhhorod

- Ukrainian First League: (1) 2011–12
