= Denys Bobrov =

Ukrainian footballer

Personal information
- Date of birth: 25 November 1982 (age 43)
- Place of birth: Chernihiv Ukrainian SSR, USSR
- Height: 1.84 m (6 ft 0 in)
- Position: Goalkeeper

Senior career*
Years	Team	Apps	(Gls)
2003	Boreks-Borysfen Borodianka	19	(0)
2004	Polissya Zhytomyr	14	(0)
2004–2005	Desna Chernihiv	4	(0)
2005–2010	Tytan Armiansk	77	(0)
2011	Mykolaiv	14	(0)
2012	Stal Dniprodzerzhynsk	8	(0)
2012	Zhemchuzhina Yalta	21	(0)
2013	Myr Hornostayivka	31	(0)
2014	Tytan Armiansk	6	(0)
2014–2017	Inhulets Petrove	31	(0)
2016–2017	→ Inhulets-2 Petrove	1	(0)
- * Club domestic league appearances and goals

Denys Bobrov (Ukrainian: Бобров Денис Сергійович; born 25 November 1982) is a Ukrainian retired footballer.

== Career ==
Denys Bobrov, started his career with Systema-Boreks Borodianka, Boreks-Borysfen, Polissya Zhytomyr. In 2004 he moved to Desna Chernihiv, the main city of Chernihiv in Ukrainian Second League which got second in the season 2004–05. In 2005 he moved to Tytan Armiansk until 2010 where he played 77 matches and then he moved to Mykolaiv for two seasons where he played 14 matches. In 2011 he played 8 games with Stal Kamianske and 9 with Myr Hornostayivka. In 2012 he moved to Zhemchuzhina Yalta and to Tytan Armiansk. In summer 2013 he moved to Myr Hornostayivka for one season where he played 22 matches. In 2015 he moved to Inhulets Petrove for two season where with the club he won the Ukrainian Second League in the season 2015–16 and he played 1 match for Inhulets-2 Petrove.

== Honours ==
Inhulets Petrove

- Ukrainian Second League: 2015–16

Desna Chernihiv

- Ukrainian Second League: Runner-Up 2004–05
