= Vasyl Skybenko =

Soviet footballer and Ukrainian coach

Personal information
- Full name: Скибенко Василь Іванович
- Date of birth: 13 April 1978 (age 48)
- Place of birth: Korolivka Ukrainian SSR, USSR
- Height: 1.84 m (6 ft 0 in)
- Position: Goalkeeper

Senior career*
Years	Team	Apps	(Gls)
1994-1998	Dynamo-3 Kyiv	12	(0)
1998-1999	Borysfen	18	(0)
1999-2001	Prykarpattia-2 Ivano-Frankivsk	18	(0)
2001-2002	Prykarpattia Ivano-Frankivsk	36	(0)
2002-2004	Desna Chernihiv	50	(0)
2004-2005	Spartak Ivano-Frankivsk	16	(0)
2005-2006	Borysfen	20	(0)
2006-2007	Helios Kharkiv	7	(0)
2006-2007	Borysfen	7	(0)
2007-2008	Poltava	13	(0)
2007-2008	Feniks-Illichovets Kalinine	3	(0)
2008-2009	Nafkom Brovary	10	(0)
2008-2009	Poltava	1	(0)
2009-2011	Nyva Vinnytsia	19	(0)
2011	Putrivka	10	(0)
2011-2015	Yednist-2 Plysky	1	(0)
2015-2018	Kyiv Patriots	53	(0)
- * Club domestic league appearances and goals as of 19 March 2021

Vasyl Skybenko (Ukrainian: Скибенко Василь Іванович; born April 13, 1978) is a retired Ukrainian football player.

== Career ==
Vasyl Skybenko was born in the village of Korolivka, and started playing football at SDYUSHOR Dynamo Kyiv. He started performing on football fields in 1995 as part of the Dynamo-3 Kyiv amateur team, and in the 1997–1998 season he played for Ukrainian Second League.

The following season, he moved to Borysfen, from Boryspil city. In 1999, he became a player of the team of Prykarpattia Ivano-Frankivsk in Ukrainian Premier League, however, in the first season of the new season, he played exclusively as part of Prykarpattia-2 Ivano-Frankivsk, which played in Ukrainian Second League. As part of the main team of the Prykarpattia Ivano-Frankivsk club, Skibenko started playing at the beginning of the 2000–2001 season, when the team was already playing in the first league, and became the main goalkeeper. In 2002, the football player joined the team of the second league Desna Chernihiv from Chernihiv city, in which he spent two seasons.

At the beginning of the 2004–2005 season, Vasyl Skybenko returned to the Spartak Ivano-Frankivsk, which at that time played under the name "Spartak", but this time he was not the main goalkeeper of the team, playing only 16 matches for the Spartak Ivano-Frankivsk.

Skibenko started the next season as part of Borysfen, which at that time had already reached the first league, and played in it until the end of 2006, playing 27 championship matches. The football player spent the second half of the 2006–2007 season as part of another team of the first league Helios Kharkiv from Kharkiv, for which he played 7 matches, and in the second half of 2007 he played for the first league club from Crimea Feniks-Illichovets Kalinine, in which he played only 3 matches. In 2017 he moved to Poltava, where he played 13 matches.

At the beginning of the 2009–2010 season, Skybenko became a player of Nyva Vinnytsia, and won a ticket to the first league with it. He played in the Vinnytsia team until the end of 2010, and during 2011 he played in amateur team Putrivka in the AAFU championship, and became the winner of the Oleh Makarov Memorial Tournament.

At the beginning of 2012, the football player joined the team of the second league Yednist' Plysky from the village of Plysky, and after the elimination of the team from the professional league, he played in it until 2015. In 2018 he moved to amateur teams Patriot until the end of 2021, becoming the oldest player and he become the best goalkeeper of the championship of the Kyiv region.

== Honours ==
Nyva Vinnytsia

- Ukrainian Second League: 2009–10

Putrivka

- Association of the Amateur Football of Ukraine: 2011 (finalist)
