= Serhiy Alayev =

Ukrainian footballer

Personal information
- Full name: Serhiy Anatoliyovych Alayev
- Date of birth: 6 April 1983 (age 43)
- Place of birth: Chernihiv, Ukrainian SSR, USSR
- Height: 1.84 m (6 ft 0 in)
- Position: Forward

Youth career
- 2000: Yunist Chernihiv

Senior career*
Years	Team	Apps	(Gls)
1999–2004	Desna Chernihiv	47	(11)
2004	Polissya Dobryanka	0	(0)
2004–2007	Desna Chernihiv	66	(9)
2007–2008	Hirnyk-Sport Komsomolsk	29	(10)
2008–2009	Stal Kamianske	4	(0)
2009	Polissya Dobryanka	0	(0)
2010–2011	Desna Chernihiv	17	(4)
2012	ATK Chernihiv	15	(7)
2013	LKT-Slavutych Slavutych	6	(0)
2015–2020	Avanhard Koryukivka	35	(5)
- * Club domestic league appearances and goals as of 23 January 2022

Serhiy Anatoliyovych Alayev (Ukrainian: Сергій Анатолійович Алаєв) is a Ukrainian retired professional footballer.

== Career ==
Sergey Alayev started his career with Yunist Chernihiv. In 1999 he moved to the main club of Chernihiv, where he played 2 matcthes. Here he stayed until 2004 playing 47 matches and scoring 11 goal. In summer 2004 he moved to Polesie Dobryanka without playing and he returned to Desna Chernihiv. In the season 2005–06 he won the Ukrainian Second League. In 2007 he moved to Hirnyk-Sport Horishni Plavni and in summer 2008 he moved to Stal Kamianske. Then he returned to Desna Chernihiv where he played 17 matches and scoring 4 goals. In 2010 he moved back to Desna Chernihiv. In 2013 he played 6 matches LKT-Slavutich Slavutich and in 2015 he moved to Avanhard Koryukivka playing 35 matches and scoring 5 goals.

== Honours ==
Desna Chernihiv

- Ukrainian Second League: 2005–06
