= Serhiy Burkovskyi =

Soviet footballer and Ukrainian coach

Personal information
- Date of birth: 8 August 1972 (age 54)
- Place of birth: Lutsk, Ukrainian SSR, USSR
- Height: 1.84 m (6 ft 1/2 in)
- Position: Defender

Senior career*
Years	Team	Apps	(Gls)
1994–1995	FC Pidshypnyk Lutsk	15	(0)
1996	ENKO Lutsk	2	(0)
1996	Kovel-Volyn Kovel	4	(0)
1997	Veres Rivne	15	(0)
1997	Torpedo Zaporizhzhia	11	(0)
1998–2002	Volyn Lutsk	93	(4)
2001	→ Kovel-Volyn-2 Kovel	1	(0)
2002	→ LUKOR Kalush (loan)	4	(0)
2003	Zhetysu	0	(0)
2003	Prylad-LDTU Lutsk	4	(0)
2004	Desna Chernihiv	12	(0)
2007–2008	ODEK Orzhiv		
- * Club domestic league appearances and goals as of 25 December 2021

Serhiy Burkovskyi (Ukrainian: Сергій Збиславович Бурковський) is a Ukrainian retired footballer.

== Career ==
Serhiy Burkovskyi, started his career with Veres Rovno in 1997 and Torpedo Zaporizhzhia. In 1998 he moved to Volyn Lutsk until 2002, where he won the Ukrainian First League in the season 2001–02. He also played for Kovel-Volyn Kovel 2. He also played 4 matches for LUKOR Kalush and in summer 2003 he moved to Desna Chernihiv the main club in the city of Chernihiv. Here he managed to play 12 matches and got second place in Ukrainian Second League in the season 2004–05.

== Honours ==
Volyn Lutsk

- Ukrainian First League: 2001–02

Desna Chernihiv

- Ukrainian Second League: Runner-Up 2004–05
