= Artem Perevozchikov =

Ukrainian footballer

Personal information
- Date of birth: 21 October 1980 (age 46)
- Place of birth: Chernihiv, Ukrainian SSR, USSR
- Height: 1.84 m (6 ft 0 in)
- Position: Midfielder

Senior career*
Years	Team	Apps	(Gls)
1999–2002	Desna Chernihiv	60	(2)
2002–2003	Sokil Zolochiv	1	(0)
2003–2006	Desna Chernihiv	43	(5)
2005–2006	Spartak Sumy	9	(0)
2007–2008	Hirnyk-Sport Horishni Plavni	2	(0)
2012	Stroitel-Energy Repki	4	(0)
2012	Avanhard Koryukivka	1	(0)
2015	Kobra-2000 Chernihiv	8	(0)
2016	FC Nizhyn	13	(4)
2017	Avers Bakhmach	1	(0)
- * Club domestic league appearances and goals as of 28 January 2022

Artem Perevozchikov (Ukrainian: Перевозчиков Артём Николаевич; born 21 October 1980) is a retired Ukrainian professional footballer who played as a midfielder.

== Career ==
Artem Perevozchikov started his career in 1999 with Desna Chernihiv, the main club in the city of Chernihiv, in Ukrainian Second League where he played 11 matches and with the club finished 9th in the league. In January 2003 he moved to Sokil Zolochiv where he played 1 match. In summer 2003 he moved back to Desna Chernihiv where he won the 2005–06 Ukrainian Second League. He also played 9 matches with Spartak Sumy. In summer 2007 he moved to Hirnyk-Sport Horishni Plavni, where he played 2 matches in the 2007–08 Ukrainian Second League season. In 2012 he moved to Stroitel-Energy Repki where he played 4 matches and then he moved to Avanhard Koryukivka where he won the Chernihiv Oblast Football Championship. In 2015 he moved to Kobra-2000 Chernihiv where he played 8 matches and in 2016 he moved to FC Frunzivets Nizhyn scoring 4 goals and winning the Chernihiv Oblast Football Championship and the Chernihiv Oblast Football Cup.

== Honours ==
Frunzivets Nizhyn

- Chernihiv Oblast Football Championship: 2016
- Chernihiv Oblast Football Cup: 2016

Avangard Korukivka

- Chernihiv Oblast Football Championship: 2012

Desna Chernihiv

- Ukrainian Second League: 2005–06
