= Artem Koleda =

Ukrainian footballer (born 1981)

Personal information
- Full name: Artem Serhiyovych Koleda
- Date of birth: 15 December 1981 (age 44)
- Place of birth: Chernihiv, Ukrainian SSR, USSR
- Height: 1.84 m (6 ft 0 in)
- Position: Goalkeeper

Senior career*
Years	Team	Apps	(Gls)
1999–2001	Dnipro Cherkasy	10	(0)
2001–2002	Krystal Kherson	9	(0)
2002–2003	Desna Chernihiv	1	(0)
2002–2003	Krystal Kherson	3	(0)
2003–2007	Desna Chernihiv	67	(0)
2007–2008	Hirnyk-Sport Horishni Plavni	10	(0)
2008–2010	Arsenal-Kyivshchyna Bila Tserkva	11	(0)
2009–2010	Desna Chernihiv	15	(0)
2010–2012	Zirka Kropyvnytskyi	11	(0)
Total		137	(0)

Managerial career
- 2012–2017: Zirka Kropyvnytskyi (goalkeeping coach)
- 2017–2018: Zirka-2 Kropyvnytskyi (goalkeeping coach)
- 2018–2019: Zirka Kropyvnytskyi (goalkeeping coach)
- 2019–2022: Zorya Luhansk U19 (goalkeeping coach)
- 2022–: Zorya Luhansk (goalkeeping coach)
- * Club domestic league appearances and goals

Artem Serhiyovych Koleda (Ukrainian: Артем Сергійович Коледа, born 15 December 1981) is a Ukrainian former footballer who played as a goalkeeper. He is currently the goalkeeper coach at Zorya Luhansk.

== Career ==
Koleda began his career at Dnipro Cherkasy in 1999. In 2001 he signed with Krystal Kherson, beginning a career jumping around a handful of lower-level teams in Ukraine, including several stints at Desna Chernihiv. He finally ended his playing career in 2012 with Zirka Kropyvnytskyi.

== After retirement ==
In June 2012 he became the goalkeeping coach of Zirka Kropyvnytskyi.

== Honours ==
Arsenal-Kyivshchyna Bila Tserkva

- Ukrainian Second League runner-up: 2008–09

Desna Chenrihiv

- Ukrainian Second League runner-up: 2003–04
