= Oleksandr Babor =

Ukrainian footballer

Personal information
- Full name: Oleksandr Viktorovych Babor
- Date of birth: 17 March 1980 (age 46)
- Place of birth: Ukrainian SSR, USSR
- Height: 1.84 m (6 ft 1/2 in)
- Position: Midfielder

Youth career
- 1997: Desna Chernihiv

Senior career*
Years	Team	Apps	(Gls)
1997–2000	Desna Chernihiv	11	(1)
2000–2001	Ros Bila Tserkva	37	(2)
2001	Ros-2 Bila Tserkva	1	(0)
2001–2002	Desna Chernihiv	16	(0)
2001–2002	Ros Bila Tserkva	15	(2)
2002–2003	Desna Chernihiv	25	(2)
2002–2003	Sokil Zolochiv	3	(0)
2003–2004	Desna Chernihiv	8	(0)
2004	Interahrosystem Mena	2	(0)
2004–2006	Desna Chernihiv	40	(2)
2006–2007	Dnipro Cherkasy	11	(0)
2007–2009	Desna Chernihiv	51	(4)
2009	Mykolaiv	5	(0)
2009	Yednist-2 Plysky	7	(3)
2009–2010	Desna Chernihiv	1	(0)
2010–2012	Yednist-2 Plysky	19	(7)
2012	LKT Chernihiv	15	(3)
2013	LKT-Slavutych Slavutych	15	(1)
2014	Avanhard Koriukivka	5	(0)
2015	LKT Chernihiv	9	(1)
2015	Avanhard Koriukivka	2	(0)
2016	Frunzenets Nizhyn	12	(2)
2016–2018	Avanhard Koriukivka	10	(2)
2018–2020	Kudrivka	14	(2)

Managerial career
- 2019: Yednist-ShVSM Plysky
- 2020–2022: Kudrivka
- 2024–2025: Livyi Bereh Kyiv (youth)
- 2025–: Livyi Bereh Kyiv (U19 assistant)
- * Club domestic league appearances and goals as of 13 November 2022

Oleksandr Viktorovych Babor (Ukrainian: Олександр Вікторович Бабор; born 17 March 1980) is a Ukrainian retired professional footballer who played as a defender.

== Career ==
Oleksandr Babor started his career in 1997 with Desna Chernihiv the main club of the city of Chernihiv. Here he played three seasons. In 2000 he moved to Ros Bila Tserkva where he managed to play 37 matches and scored 2 goals. In 2004 he moved to Desna Chernihiv where he won the 2005–06 Ukrainian Second League. He also played for Sokil Zolochiv, Dnipro Cherkasy and Mykolaiv. In 2009 he moved to Yednist-2 Plysky where he managed to win the Chernihiv Oblast Championship in 2009, 2010 and 2011, he also won the Chernihiv Oblast Cup in 2009 and 2010. In 2016 he moved to Frunzenets Nizhyn where he managed to win again the Chernihiv Oblast Championship and the Chernihiv Oblast Cup. After he played for Avanhard Koryukivka and in Kudrivka where he ended his career.

== Managerial career ==
In 2019 he was appointed as head coach of Yednist-ShVSM Plysky. I 2020 he become coach of Kudrivka where he managed to win the Chernihiv Oblast Football Championship in 2022.

== Philanthropy ==
In March 2022, together with Artem Padun, Valentyn Krukovets and Volodymyr Chulanov, Oleksandr organized a charity tournament at the Chernihiv Stadium to raise funds to reconstruct the house of Volodymyr Matsuta which was destroyed by the Russian troops during the Siege of Chernihiv.

== Honours ==
=== As a Player ===
Desna Chernihiv

- Ukrainian Second League: 2005–06

Yednist-2 Plysky

- Chernihiv Oblast Championship: 2009, 2010, 2011
- Chernihiv Oblast Cup: 2009, 2010

Frunzenets Nizhyn

- Chernihiv Oblast Championship: 2016
- Chernihiv Oblast Cup: 2016

=== As a Coach ===
Kudrivka

- Chernihiv Oblast Football Championship: 2022
- Chernihiv Oblast Football Cup: 2021, 2022
- Chernihiv Oblast Super Cup: 2021, 2022
- Kyiv Oblast Football Federation: 2020
- Kyiv Oblast Football Cup: 2021
