= Valentyn Krukovets =

Ukrainian footballer and coach

Personal information
- Full name: Valentyn Vasylyovych Krukovets
- Date of birth: 18 March 1979 (age 47)
- Place of birth: Lutsk, Ukrainian SSR, USSR
- Positions: Midfielder; striker

Senior career*
Years	Team	Apps	(Gls)
1997–1998	Khutrovyk Tysmenytsia	11	(1)
1998–1999	Troyanda-Ekspres Hirka Polonka	18	(4)
2000	Volyn Lutsk	32	(2)
2000–2003	Sokil Zolochiv	65	(18)
2002–2003	→ Desna Chernihiv (loan)	16	(5)
2003–2007	Desna Chernihiv	127	(46)
2008	Stal Dniprodzerzhynsk	7	(1)
2008–2013	Polissya Dobryanka	12	(2)
2018–2019	Ahrodim Bakhmach	12	(9)
2019–2023	Kudrivka	20	(2)

Managerial career
- 2008–2013: Polissya Dobryanka (coach)
- 2020: Kudrivka
- * Club domestic league appearances and goals

Valentyn Vasylyovych Krukovets (Ukrainian: Валентин Васильович Круковець; born 18 March 1979) is a Ukrainian former professional footballer.

== Philanthropy ==
On 12 March 2022, together with Artem Padun, Volodymyr Chulanov, Oleksandr Babor, he organized a charity tournament at Chernihiv Stadium to raise money to reconstruct the house of Volodymyr Matsuta which was destroyed by Russian troops during the Siege of Chernihiv.

== Honours ==
Kudrivka

- Chernihiv Oblast Football Cup 2021, 2022
- Kyiv Oblast Football Federation: 2020
- Kyiv Oblast Football Cup: 2021

Desna Chernihiv

- Ukrainian Second League: 2005–06

Sokil Zolochiv

- Ukrainian Second League: 2001–02

Individual

- Desna Chernihiv Player of the Year: 2007
