= FC Metalist-2 Kharkiv =

Ukrainian football team

FC Metalist-2 Kharkiv was a Ukrainian football team based in Kharkiv, Ukraine. The club has been featured regularly in the Ukrainian Second Division it serves as a junior team for the FC Metalist Kharkiv franchise. Like most tributary teams, the best players are sent up to the senior team, meanwhile developing other players for further call-ups.

The FC Avanhard Merefa that represented the Kharkiv Glass Factory was promoted to the Ukrainian Second League in 1996. After bankruptcy of the factory, the club was merged with FC Metalist Kharkiv and moved to Kharkiv initially as Avanhard-Metalist Kharkiv. The next season the club was officially renamed into Metalist-2 Kharkiv.

With introduction of competitions for reserves teams of the Higher League and placing 14th out of 15 team in the Second League competition, the team was withdrawn out of the league.

== League history ==
Season	Div.	Pos.	Pl.	W	D	L	GS	GA	P	Domestic Cup	Europe	Notes
1997	team created based on FC Avanhard-Metalist (formerly FC Avanhard Merefa)											
1997–98	3rd (Druha Liha)	13	30	8	4	18	39	52	28	1/128 finals		
1998–99	3rd (Druha Liha)	4	26	15	3	8	26	19	48			
1999–2000	3rd (Druha Liha)	11	26	8	5	13	21	31	29			
2000–01	3rd (Druha Liha)	9	30	11	7	12	39	43	40			
2001–02	3rd (Druha Liha)	10	34	12	9	13	42	41	45			
2002–03	3rd (Druha Liha)	7	28	9	10	9	32	24	37			
2003–04	3rd (Druha Liha)	5	30	17	4	9	55	27	55			
2003–04	3rd (Druha Liha)	5	30	17	4	9	55	27	55			
2004–05	3rd (Druha Liha)	14	28	6	6	16	28	49	24			dissolved
