= FC Elektrometalurh-NZF Nikopol =

Elektrometalurh-NZF Nikopol
- Logo of Metalurh
- Full name: FC Elektrometalurh-NZF Nikopol
- Founded: 1972
- Ground: Elektrometalurh Stadium
- Capacity: 7,200
- League: Dnipropetrovsk Regional Championship
- 2011: N/A
Home colours

FC Elektrometalurh-NZF Nikopol (also referred as FC Elektrometalurg-NZF Nikopol) is an amateur Ukrainian football club. The club is based in Nikopol, Ukraine and sponsored by the Nikopol Ferroalloy Plant (NZF).

== Brief history ==
=== Metalurh→Trubnik ===
In 1962–1970 in Nikopol existed another team of masters that was called Metalurh and later Trubnyk. Following the liquidation of the Soviet Class B competitions in 1971, Trubnyk was disbanded.

==== Managers ====
- 1958–1959 Morozov
- 1962–1962 Hreber
- 1968–1970 Yemets

=== Kolos→Metalurh→Elektrometalurh ===
The team was founded in 1950 as Kolos Nikopol Raion and in 1950–1970 competed in regional competitions of Volunteer Sport Society "Kolos" and the second group (tier) of the Dnipropetrovsk Oblast Championship. In 1971 it carried a name Selkhoztekhnika. That year the team's head coach was appointed Volodymyr Yemets who just before that was a head coach of Trubnik Nikopol. The team was also promoted to the Dnipropetrovsk Oblast top tier championship. In 1972 it changed its name back to Kolos and also entered republican competitions of KFK. The team was representing a collective farm of Nikopol Raion imeni Karla Marksa. After couple of seasons in competitions of KFK, on 14 October 1973 based on the team there was established Sports Club Kolos representing Nikopol Raion. In 1975 it won competitions of KFK and in 1976 entered competitions among teams of masters at the Soviet Second League. After few season, in 1979 it won the Ukrainian championship among teams of masters in the Soviet Second League and a brief promotional tournament among Second League group winners. Entering the Soviet First League, for the first couple of seasons Kolos was placing 5th place and in 1982 it had a chance to get promoted to Soviet Top League, but finished just a step short of promotion. At that time the club was coached by Yevhen Kucherevsky. In 1984 Kolos was almost relegated to the third tier, but managed to recover and for a few seasons stayed among mid-table clubs. It finally relegated in 1988 and then in 1989 again due to reorganization of the Soviet league system.

Following dissolution of the Soviet Union and organization of separate football competitions in the independence of Ukraine, the club joined was placed in the Ukrainian First League. In February 1992, it changed its name to Metalurh as the agrarian association Nikopolsky that was sponsoring Kolos was going through some financial hardship and the club was sold to the Nikopol's two main factories the Nikopol Ferroalloy Plant and the Southern Pipe-rolling factory. In 1999 the Southern Pipe-rolling factory was going through bankruptcy and was restructured, so the club's sole sponsor became the Nikopol Ferroalloy Plant.

In 2001 the club changed its name to Electrometalurh and in 2002 again to Electrometalurh-NZF when it got relegated to the Ukrainian Second League. After the unsuccessful season in 2005, the club gave up its professional status.

=== Rostok→Kolos ===
In 2001 the team of Nikopol Raion was reestablished as "Rostok" by a team of local agrarian company competing at regional competitions of Dnipropetrovsk Oblast. In 2002 it changed its name to Kolos Nikopol Raion.

== Awards ==
The team achieved third place in the USSR 1st League 1982 and 1985.

The best results in the Ukraine Championship

- the Runner up (2nd place) of group "B" of the First League in 1992

The other

- 3rd in the First League of 1995
- 3rd in the Second League of 2003
- 2nd in the Second League of 2004

== League and cup history ==
Season	Div.	Pos.	Pl.	W	D	L	GS	GA	P	Domestic Cup	Europe	Notes
1992	2nd	2	26	15	7	4	45	19	37			
1992–93	2nd	13	42	13	14	15	43	50	40			
1993–94	2nd	9	38	15	6	17	44	56	36			
1994–95	2nd	3	42	24	7	11	66	42	79			
1995–96	2nd	5	42	23	5	14	59	40	74			
1996–97	2nd	11	46	20	4	22	60	66	64			
1997–98	2nd	11	42	19	4	19	44	61	61			
1998–99	2nd	15	38	16	3	19	46	63	51			
1999-00	2nd	12	34	14	6	14	31	34	48			
2000–01	2nd	7	34	14	8	12	30	34	50			
2001–02	2nd	16	34	10	7	17	30	41	37			
2002–03	3rd	3	34	16	5	13	54	50	53			
2003–04	3rd	2	34	21	7	6	59	24	70			
2004–05	3rd	9	26	10	2	14	26	36	32			
2006	4th	2	6	3	1	2	7	6	10			
2006	4th	4	3	0	0	3	2	8	0			
2010	4th	4	8	2	1	5	16	15	7			

== Notable players ==
- Ihor Lytovka
- Dmytro Lelyuk
- Ihor Kiriyenko
