= 1981 FC Desna Chernihiv season =

FC Desna Chernihiv
1981 season
- Manager: Yukhym Shkolnykov
- Stadium: Chernihiv Stadium
- Football Championship of the Ukrainian SSR: 12th of 23
- Top goalscorer: League: Hennadiy Horshkov (14); All: Hennadiy Horshkov (14)
- Biggest win: Desna Chernihiv 5-0 Dnipro Cherkasy; SKA Lviv 0-5 Desna Chernihiv
- Biggest defeat: Dnipro Cherkasy 4-2 Desna Chernihiv
Home colours	Away colours

For the 1981 season, FC Desna Chernihiv competed in the 1981 Soviet Second League, Zone 5.

== Season summary ==
Yukhym Shkolnykov was confirmed as coach. The club participates in the Football Championship of the Ukrainian SSR. The club released some players such as Alexander Egurnov, Alexander Degtyarev, Volodymyr Ivashchenko, Igor Kotlyar, Anatoly Kudya, Viktor Lazarenko, Anatoly Pavlov, Nikolay Popeko, Vadim Tkachenko, Viktor Chulanov, Igor Tennak and Andriy Protsko. Yukhym Shkolnykov noticed young Oleh Kuznetsov playing for an amateur team and invited him to join the senior squad, increasingly relying on him and beginning to place his active confidence in Kuznetsov. On 17 April 1981, the club played a preseason friendly match against Dynamo Kyiv, losing 0–2 at the Chernihiv Stadium in Chernihiv. Desna Chernihiv finished the Football Championship of the Ukrainian SSR in thirteenth place, with 13 wins, 15 draws, and 16 losses.

== Players ==
=== Squad information ===
As of 5 November 2026

Squad no.	Name	Nationality	Position	Date of birth (age)
Goalkeepers
	Serhiy Umen	(Soviet Union)	GK	29 March 1962 (aged 19)
	Vyacheslav Kiselev	(Soviet Union)	GK	8 February 1949 (aged 32)
Defenders
	Mykola Lytvyn	(Soviet Union)	DF	27 November 1963 (aged 17)
	Sergey Ostap	(Soviet Union)	DF	3 July 1956 (aged 25)
	Oleksandr Bobaryko	(Soviet Union)	DF	4 March 1957 (aged 24)
	Vladimir Hlukhov	(Soviet Union)	DF	31 December 1957 (aged 23)
	Nikolay Lipoviy	(Soviet Union)	DF	21 May 1957 (aged 24)
	Viktor Dohadailo	(Soviet Union)	DF	17 April 1960 (aged 21)
	Alexander Stetsko	(Soviet Union)	DF	28 February 1963 (aged 18)
	Serhiy Sapronov	(Soviet Union)	DF	21 October 1961 (aged 19)
	Valery Tretyakov	(Soviet Union)	DF	21 November 1960 (aged 20)
Midfielders
	Viktor Danilevsky	(Soviet Union)	MF	18 July 1951 (aged 30)
	Anatoly Veretinsky	(Soviet Union)	MF	8 September 1954 (aged 26)
	Valentyn Buhlak	(Soviet Union)	MF	1 January 1961 (aged 20)
	Yuri Voronkov	(Soviet Union)	MF	8 September 1954 (aged 26)
	Alexander Kochergin	(Soviet Union)	MF	8 September 1963 (aged 17)
	Vyacheslav Kislenko	(Soviet Union)	MF	27 May 1959 (aged 22)
	Oleh Kuznetsov	(Soviet Union) (East Germany)	MF	22 March 1963 (aged 18)
	Oleh Kuzmenko	(Soviet Union)	MF	27 February 1969 (aged 12)
	Svyatoslav Petrenko	(Soviet Union)	MF	2 July 1961 (aged 20)
	Fedor Prikhodko	(Soviet Union)	MF	24 February 1961 (aged 20)
	Viktor Rudyi	(Soviet Union)	MF	11 February 1962 (aged 19)
	Stanislav Ustich	(Soviet Union)	MF	6 October 1956 (aged 24)
	Sergey Khamzin	(Soviet Union)	MF	6 October 1962 (aged 18)
Forwards
	Volodymyr Hrytsai	(Soviet Union)	FW	4 September 1957 (aged 23)
	Hennadiy Horshkov	(Soviet Union)	FW	8 January 1953 (aged 28)

== Transfers ==
=== In ===
Date	Pos.	Player	Age	Moving from	Type	Fee	Source
Summer
8 January 1981	MF	(Soviet Union) Oleh Kuznetsov	24	(Soviet Union) Yunist Chernihiv	Transfer	Free	
9 January 1981	MF	(Soviet Union) Valentyn Buhlak	20	(Soviet Union) Yunist Chernihiv	Transfer	Free	
10 January 1981	MF	(Soviet Union) Anatoly Veretinsky	26	(Soviet Union) Kryvbas Kryvyi Rih	Transfer	Free	
11 January 1981	MF	(Soviet Union) Alexander Kochergin	17	Unattached	Transfer	Free	
11 January 1981	MF	(Soviet Union) Oleh Kuzmenko	12	Unattached	Transfer	Free	
11 January 1981	DF	(Soviet Union) Alexander Stetsko	18	Unattached	Transfer	Free	
11 January 1981	DF	(Soviet Union) Valery Tretyakov	20	Unattached	Transfer	Free	
11 January 1981	MF	(Soviet Union) Sergey Khamzin	18	Unattached	Transfer	Free	
11 January 1981	DF	(Soviet Union) Sergey Ostap	25	(Soviet Union) Luch Chernihiv	Transfer	Free	
11 January 1981	DF	(Soviet Union) Vladimir Hlukhov	23	(Soviet Union) Titan Vilnohirsk	Transfer	Free	
11 January 1981	DF	(Soviet Union) Viktor Dohadailo	21	(Soviet Union) Ocean Kerch	Transfer	Free	
11 January 1981	DF	(Soviet Union) Nikolay Litvin	24	Unattached	Transfer		
11 January 1981	MF	(Soviet Union) Fedor Prikhodko	20	(Soviet Union) Elektrometalurh-NZF	Transfer	Free	

=== Out ===
Date	Pos.	Player	Age	Moving to	Type	Fee	Source
Summer
8 January 1981	DF	(Soviet Union) Alexander Egurnov		(Soviet Union) Luch Chernihiv	Transfer	Free	
8 January 1981	MF	(Soviet Union) Alexander Degtyarev		(Soviet Union) Chornomorets Odesa	Transfer	Free	
8 January 1981	DF	(Soviet Union) Volodymyr Ivashchenko		(Soviet Union) Metalurh Zaporizhzhia	Transfer	Free	
8 January 1981	FW	(Soviet Union) Igor Kotlyar		(Soviet Union) Metalurh Zaporizhzhia	Transfer	Free	
8 January 1981	FW	(Soviet Union) Anatoly Kudya		(Soviet Union) Elektrometalurh-NZF	Transfer	Free	
8 January 1981	DF	(Soviet Union) Viktor Lazarenko		(Soviet Union) Zirka Kropyvnytskyi	Transfer	Free	
8 January 1981	DF	(Soviet Union) Anatoly Pavlov		(Soviet Union) Zarya Voroshilovgrad	Transfer	Free	
8 January 1981	MF	(Soviet Union) Nikolay Popeko		Unattached	Transfer	Free	
8 January 1981	FW	(Soviet Union) Andriy Protsko		Retired			
8 January 1981	MF	(Soviet Union) Igor Tennak		(Soviet Union) Zarya Voroshilovgrad	Transfer	Free	
8 January 1981	MF	(Soviet Union) Vadim Tkachenko		Unattached	Transfer	Free	
8 January 1981	MF	(Soviet Union) Viktor Chulanov		Unattached	Transfer	Free	

== Pre-season and friendlies ==
Win Draw Loss

17 April 1981 Friendly	Chernihiv (Ukraine)	0–2	(Ukraine) Dynamo Kyiv
EET (UTC+02:00)		Report

== Competitions ==
=== Overall ===
Competition	First match	Last match	Starting round	Final position	Record							
Competition	First match	Last match	Starting round	Final position	Pld	W	D	L	GF	GA	GD	Win %
Soviet Second League	5 April 1981	20 October 1981	Matchday 1	13th	44	13	15	16	48	38	+10	29.55
Total					44	13	15	16	48	38	+10	29.55

Last updated: 5 November 2026
Source: Competitions

=== Soviet Second League ===
==== League table ====
Pos	Team	Pld	W	D	L	GF	GA	GD	Pts	Qualification or relegation
1	Kryvbas Kryvyi Rih (C, Q)	44	25	15	4	68	33	+35	65	Qualified for interzonal competitions among other Zone winners
2	Nyva Vinnytsia	44	23	11	10	60	34	+26	57	
3	Avanhard Rivne	44	21	14	9	62	23	+39	56	
4	Bukovyna Chernivtsi	44	23	9	12	58	28	+30	55	
5	Sudnobudivnyk Mykolaiv	44	19	13	12	50	39	+11	51	
6	Atlantyka Sevastopol	44	18	15	11	64	40	+24	51	
7	Vuhlyk Horlivka	44	16	19	9	53	44	+9	51	
8	Torpedo Lutsk	44	20	8	16	56	35	+21	48	
9	SKA Lviv	44	16	15	13	49	47	+2	47	Merged with Karpaty Lviv
10	Kolos Mezhyrich	44	19	8	17	50	49	+1	46	
11	Spartak Zhytomyr	44	15	13	16	38	47	−9	43	
12	Desna Chernihiv	44	13	15	16	48	38	+10	41	
13	Okean Kerch	44	13	14	17	45	51	−6	40	
14	Podillia Khmelnytskyi	44	15	9	20	45	64	−19	39	
15	Krystal Kherson	44	15	9	20	62	73	−11	39	
16	Novator Zhdanov	44	14	11	19	41	63	−22	39	
17	Zirka Kirovohrad	44	10	19	15	36	36	0	39	
18	Zakarpattia Uzhhorod	44	13	12	19	41	44	−3	38	
19	Kolos Poltava	44	11	16	17	33	61	−28	38	
20	Dnipro Cherkasy	44	13	11	20	44	55	−11	37	
21	Frunzenets Sumy	44	9	19	16	36	56	−20	37	
22	Metalurh Dniprodzerzhynsk	44	8	13	23	31	71	−40	29	
23	Shakhtar Stakhanov	44	10	6	28	34	73	−39	26	Avoided relegation

(C) Champions; (Q) Qualified for the phase indicated

=== Soviet Second League, Zone 5 ===
5 April 1981 1	Atlantyka Sevastopol	1–0	Desna Chernihiv	Sevastopol
19:00 EEST (UTC+03:00)		Report		Stadium: Sports Complex Sevastopol

8 April 1981 2	Desna Chernihiv	3–0	Metalurh Dniprodzerzhynsk	Chernihiv
19:00 EEST (UTC+03:00)		Report		Stadium: Chernihiv Stadium

12 April 1981 3	Novator Zhdanov	2–1	Desna Chernihiv	Mariupol
19:00 EEST (UTC+03:00)		Report

14 April 1981 4	Desna Chernihiv	0–0	Kosmos Pavlohrad	Chernihiv
19:00 EEST (UTC+03:00)		Report		Stadium: Chernihiv Stadium

21 April 1981 5	Shakhtar Stakhanov	1–0	Desna Chernihiv	Kadiivka
19:00 EEST (UTC+03:00)		Report		Stadium: Peremoha Stadium

29 April 1981 6	Frunzenets Sumy	0–1	Desna Chernihiv	Sumy
19:00 EEST (UTC+03:00)		Report		Stadium: Yuvileiny Stadium

4 May 1981 7	Desna Chernihiv	5–0	Dnipro Cherkasy	Chernihiv
19:00 EEST (UTC+03:00)		Report		Stadium: Chernihiv Stadium

7 May 1981 8	Desna Chernihiv	3–0	Metalurh Dniprodzerzhynsk	Chernihiv
19:00 EEST (UTC+03:00)		Report		Stadium: Chernihiv Stadium

12 May 1981 9	Novator Zhdanov	2–1	Desna Chernihiv	Mariupol
19:00 EEST (UTC+03:00)		Report		Stadium: Volodymyr Boyko Stadium

15 May 1981 10	Vuhlyk Horlivka	2–0	Desna Chernihiv	Horlivka
19:00 EEST (UTC+03:00)		Report

21 May 1981 11	Desna Chernihiv	1–1	SKA Lviv	Chernihiv
19:00 EEST (UTC+03:00)		Report		Stadium: Chernihiv Stadium

24 May 1981 12	Desna Chernihiv	1–1	Zakarpattia Uzhhorod	Chernihiv
19:00 EEST (UTC+03:00)		Report		Stadium: Chernihiv Stadium

28 May 1981 13	Avanhard Rivne	1–1	Desna Chernihiv	Rivne
19:00 EEST (UTC+03:00)		Report		Stadium: Avanhard Stadium

1 June 1981 14	Desna Chernihiv	1–0	Torpedo Lutsk	Chernihiv
19:00 EEST (UTC+03:00)		Report		Stadium: Chernihiv Stadium

7 June 1981 15	Desna Chernihiv	1–0	Bukovyna Chernivtsi	Chernihiv
19:00 EEST (UTC+03:00)		Report		Stadium: Chernihiv Stadium

7 June 1981 16	Desna Chernihiv	1–1	Podillia Khmelnytskyi	Chernihiv
19:00 EEST (UTC+03:00)		Report		Stadium: Chernihiv Stadium

16 June 1981 17	Spartak Zhytomyr	2–1	Desna Chernihiv	Zhytomyr
19:00 EEST (UTC+03:00)		Report		Stadium: Tsentralnyi Stadium

19 June 1981 18	Nyva Vinnytsia	3–2	Desna Chernihiv	Vinnytsia
19:00 EEST (UTC+03:00)		Report		Stadium: Tsentralnyi Stadium

25 June 1981 19	Sudnobudivnyk Mykolaiv	1–1	Desna Chernihiv	Mykolaiv
19:00 EEST (UTC+03:00)		Report		Stadium: Tsentralnyi Stadium

28 June 1981 20	Krystal Kherson	1–1	Desna Chernihiv	Kherson
19:00 EEST (UTC+03:00)		Report		Stadium: Krystal Stadium

3 July 1981 21	Desna Chernihiv	0–1	Kryvbas Kryvyi Rih	Chernihiv
19:00 EEST (UTC+03:00)		Report		Stadium: Chernihiv Stadium

6 July 1981 22	Desna Chernihiv	1–1	Zirka Kirovohrad	Chernihiv
19:00 EEST (UTC+03:00)		Report		Stadium: Chernihiv Stadium

17 July 1981 23	Desna Chernihiv	0–0	Atlantyka Sevastopol	Chernihiv
19:00 EEST (UTC+03:00)		Report		Stadium: Chernihiv Stadium

20 July 1981 24	Desna Chernihiv	1–1	Okean Kerch	Chernihiv
19:00 EEST (UTC+03:00)		Report		Stadium: Chernihiv Stadium

25 July 1981 25	Kolos Poltava	1–2	Desna Chernihiv	Poltava
19:00 EEST (UTC+03:00)		Report		Stadium: Kolos Stadium

28 July 1981 26	Kosmos Pavlohrad	0–0	Desna Chernihiv	Pavlohrad
19:00 EEST (UTC+03:00)		Report		Stadium: Shakhtar Stadium

2 August 1981 27	Desna Chernihiv	3–0	Shakhtar Stakhanov	Chernihiv
19:00 EEST (UTC+03:00)		Report		Stadium: Chernihiv Stadium

2 August 1981 28	Desna Chernihiv	1–1	Frunzenets Sumy	Chernihiv
19:00 EEST (UTC+03:00)		Report		Stadium: Chernihiv Stadium

10 August 1981 29	Dnipro Cherkasy	4–2	Desna Chernihiv	Cherkasy
19:00 EEST (UTC+03:00)		Report		Stadium: Tsentralnyi Stadion

18 August 1981 30	Metalurh Dniprodzerzhynsk	1–0	Desna Chernihiv	Kamianske
19:00 EEST (UTC+03:00)		Report		Stadium: Metalurh Stadium

24 August 1981 31	Desna Chernihiv	2–0	Novator Zhdanov	Chernihiv
19:00 EEST (UTC+03:00)		Report		Stadium: Chernihiv Stadium

27 August 1981 32	Desna Chernihiv	2–0	Vuhlyk Horlivka	Chernihiv
19:00 EEST (UTC+03:00)		Report		Stadium: Chernihiv Stadium

2 September 1981 33	SKA Lviv	0–5	Desna Chernihiv	Lviv
19:00 EEST (UTC+03:00)		Report		Stadium: Metalurh Stadium

5 September 1981 34	Zakarpattia Uzhhorod	1–0	Desna Chernihiv	Uzhhorod
19:00 EEST (UTC+03:00)		Report		Stadium: Avanhard Stadium

10 September 1981 35	Desna Chernihiv	0–3	Avanhard Rivne	Chernihiv
19:00 EEST (UTC+03:00)		Report		Stadium: Chernihiv Stadium

18 September 1981 36	Torpedo Lutsk	2–0	Desna Chernihiv	Lutsk
19:00 EEST (UTC+03:00)		Report		Stadium: Avanhard Stadium

22 September 1981 37	Bukovyna Chernivtsi	1–0	Desna Chernihiv	Chernivtsi
19:00 EEST (UTC+03:00)		Report		Stadium: Bukovyna Stadium

25 September 1981 38	Podillia Khmelnytskyi	1–0	Desna Chernihiv	Khmelnytskyi
19:00 EEST (UTC+03:00)		Report		Stadium: Sport Complex Podillia

1 October 1981 39	Desna Chernihiv	3–0	Spartak Zhytomyr	Chernihiv
19:00 EEST (UTC+03:00)		Report		Stadium: Chernihiv Stadium

4 October 1981 40	Desna Chernihiv	1–0	Nyva Vinnytsia	Chernihiv
19:00 EEST (UTC+03:00)		Report		Stadium: Chernihiv Stadium

9 October 1981 41	Desna Chernihiv	0–1	Sudnobudivnyk Mykolaiv	Chernihiv
19:00 EEST (UTC+03:00)		Report		Stadium: Chernihiv Stadium

12 October 1981 42	Desna Chernihiv	2–3	Krystal Kherson	Chernihiv
19:00 EEST (UTC+03:00)		Report		Stadium: Chernihiv Stadium

17 September 1981 43	Kryvbas Kryvyi Rih	0–0	Desna Chernihiv	Kryvyi Rih
19:00 EEST (UTC+03:00)		Report		Stadium: Hirnyk Stadium

20 September 1981 44	Zirka Kirovohrad	0–0	Desna Chernihiv	Kropyvnytskyi
19:00 EEST (UTC+03:00)		Report		Stadium: Zirka Stadium

== Statistics ==
=== Appearances and goals ===
No.	Pos	Nat	Player	Total		Soviet Second League		Cup of the Ukrainian SSR		Play-offs	
No.	Pos	Nat	Player	Apps	Goals	Apps	Goals	Apps	Goals	Apps	Goals
Goalkeepers
	GK	(Soviet Union) URS	Serhiy Umen	9	0	9	0	0	0	0	0
	GK	(Soviet Union) URS	Vyacheslav Kiselev	31	0	31	0	0	0	0	0
Defenders
	DF	(Soviet Union) URS	Mykola Lytvyn	6	1	6	1	0	0	0	0
	DF	(Soviet Union) URS	Sergey Ostap	31	1	31	1	0	0	0	0
	DF	(Soviet Union) URS	Oleksandr Bobaryko	21	1	21	1	0	0	0	0
	DF	(Soviet Union) URS	Vladimir Hlukhov	38	2	38	2	0	0	0	0
	DF	(Soviet Union) URS	Nikolay Lipoviy	39	0	39	0	0	0	0	0
	DF	(Soviet Union) URS	Viktor Dohadailo	1	0	1	0	0	0	0	0
	DF	(Soviet Union) URS	Alexander Stetsko	2	0	2	0	0	0	0	0
	DF	(Soviet Union) URS	Serhiy Sapronov	29	1	29	1	0	0	0	0
	DF	(Soviet Union) URS	Valery Tretyakov	3	0	3	0	0	0	0	0
Midfielders
	MF	(Soviet Union) URS	Oleh Kuznetsov	42	0	42	0	0	0	0	0
	MF	(Soviet Union) URS	Viktor Danilevsky	37	3	37	3	0	0	0	0
	MF	(Soviet Union) URS	Anatoly Veretinsky	11	1	11	1	0	0	0	0
	MF	(Soviet Union) URS	Valentyn Buhlak	20	1	20	1	0	0	0	0
	MF	(Soviet Union) URS	Yuri Voronkov	0	0	0	0	0	0	0	0
	MF	(Soviet Union) URS	Alexander Kochergin	1	0	1	0	0	0	0	0
	MF	(Soviet Union) URS	Vyacheslav Kislenko	39	5	39	5	0	0	0	0
	MF	(Soviet Union) URS	Oleh Kuzmenko	1	0	1	0	0	0	0	0
	MF	(Soviet Union) URS	Svyatoslav Petrenko	39	9	39	9	0	0	0	0
	MF	(Soviet Union) URS	Fedor Prikhodko	2	0	2	0	0	0	0	0
	MF	(Soviet Union) URS	Viktor Rudyi	39	1	39	1	0	0	0	0
	MF	(Soviet Union) URS	Stanislav Ustich	39	6	39	6	0	0	0	0
	MF	(Soviet Union) URS	Sergey Khamzin	2	0	2	0	0	0	0	0
Forwards
	FW	(Soviet Union) URS	Volodymyr Hrytsai	34	4	34	4	0	0	0	0
	FW	(Soviet Union) URS	Hennadiy Horshkov	41	14	41	14	0	0	0	0

Source: Competitions

Last updated: 5 November 2026

=== Goalscorers ===
Rank	No.	Pos	Nat	Name	Soviet Second League	Ukrainian SSR Cup	Play-offs	Total
1		FW	(Soviet Union)	Hennadiy Horshkov	14	0	0	14
2		MF	(Soviet Union)	Svyatoslav Petrenko	9	0	0	9
3		MF	(Soviet Union)	Stanislav Ustich	6	0	0	6
4		MF	(Soviet Union)	Vyacheslav Kislenko	5	0	0	5
5		FW	(Soviet Union)	Volodymyr Hrytsai	4	0	0	4
6		MF	(Soviet Union)	Viktor Danilevsky	3	0	0	3
7		MF	(Soviet Union)	Volodymyr Hlukhov	2	0	0	2
8		MF	(Soviet Union)	Valentyn Buhlak	1	0	0	1
9		MF	(Soviet Union)	Anatoly Veretinsky	1	0	0	1
10		MF	(Soviet Union)	Viktor Rudyi	1	0	0	1
11		DF	(Soviet Union)	Oleksandr Bobaryko	1	0	0	1
12		DF	(Soviet Union)	Serhiy Sapronov	1	0	0	1
13		DF	(Soviet Union)	Sergey Ostap	1	0	0	1
				Total	49	0	0	49

Last updated: 5 November 2026
