= 1982 FC Desna Chernihiv season =

FC Desna Chernihiv
1982 season
- Manager: Yukhym Shkolnykov
- Stadium: Chernihiv Stadium
- Football Championship of the Ukrainian SSR: 2nd of 24
- Top goalscorer: League: Hennadiy Horshkov (14); All: Hennadiy Horshkov (14)
- Biggest win: Desna Chernihiv 3-0 Podillya Khmelnytskyi; Desna Chernihiv 3-0 Ocean Kerch; Desna Chernihiv 3-0 Nyva Vinnytsia; Torpedo Lutsk 0-3 Desna Chernihiv
- Biggest defeat: Spartak Zhytomyr 4-0 Desna Chernihiv
Home colours	Away colours

For the 1981 season, FC Desna Chernihiv competed in the 1982 Soviet Second League, Zone 6.

== Season summary ==
The club participates in the Football Championship of the Ukrainian SSR. Before the season, the club terminated the contracts of defenders Oleksandr Bobaryko, Sergey Ostap, Mykola Lytvyn and Viktor Dohadailo where they moved to SKA Lviv, Tekstylnyk Chernihiv, Tavriya Simferopol and Ocean Kerch respectively. Midfielders Fedor Prikhodko, Stanislav Ustich, Anatoly Veretinsky, Oleh Kuzmenko, Sergey Khamzin, Yuri Voronkov, and Svyatoslav Petrenko have also left the club. Joining from Refrizherator Fastov is Mikhail Moskalenko, an experienced goalkeeper who has brought greater reliability between the posts. The young Oleksandr Ryabokon (who would later become one of the club's best coaches) also joins the club. In addition to the new goalkeeper e difender, Volodymyr Ivaschenko, Svyatoslav Petrenko, Vyacheslav Darvishev, Efremov Yuri, Ivan Ivanchenko, Viktor Nikitenko, Fedor Popovich, Igor Tennak, Sergey Shulyakov, Sergey Shulyakov and forward Hennadiy Chernenok from Yunist Chernihiv were added to the club. The team's midfield was anchored by the returning Oleh Kuznetsov, along with Viktor Danilevsky, Valentyn Buhlak, Vyacheslav Kislenko, and Viktor Rudyi, who ensured a high level of robust efficiency. In attack, Hennadiy Horshkov confirmed his status as the team's top scorer with 14 goals, just as in the previous season. The club finished the Football Championship of the Ukrainian SSR in second place, with 26 wins, 10 draws, and 10 losses.

== Players ==
=== Squad information ===
As of 12 November 2026

Squad no.	Name	Nationality	Position	Date of birth (age)
Goalkeepers
	Serhiy Umen	(Soviet Union)	GK	29 March 1962 (aged 20)
	Mikhail Moskalenko	(Soviet Union)	GK	8 February 1949 (aged 33)
	Vyacheslav Kiselev	(Soviet Union)	GK	8 February 1949 (aged 33)
Defenders
	Volodymyr Hlukhov	(Soviet Union)	DF	31 December 1957 (aged 24)
	Nikolay Lipoviy	(Soviet Union)	DF	21 May 1957 (aged 25)
	Serhiy Sapronov	(Soviet Union)	DF	21 October 1961 (aged 20)
	Oleksandr Ryabokon	(Soviet Union)	DF	21 February 1964 (aged 18)
	Vladimir Ivaschenko	(Soviet Union)	DF	3 August 1955 (aged 26)
	Viktor Danilevsky	(Soviet Union)	DF	18 June 1951 (aged 31)
Midfielders
	Oleh Kuznetsov	(Soviet Union) (East Germany)	MF	22 March 1963 (aged 19)
	Valentyn Buhlak	(Soviet Union)	MF	1 January 1961 (aged 21)
	Fedor Popovich	(Soviet Union)	MF	27 May 1965 (aged 16)
	Igor Tennak	(Soviet Union)	MF	13 June 1953 (aged 28)
	Vyacheslav Kislenko	(Soviet Union)	MF	27 May 1959 (aged 22)
	Svyatoslav Petrenko	(Soviet Union)	MF	2 July 1961 (aged 21)
	Fedor Prikhodko	(Soviet Union)	MF	24 February 1961 (aged 21)
	Viktor Rudyi	(Soviet Union)	MF	11 February 1962 (aged 20)
	Valery Volsky	(Soviet Union)	MF	2 January 1965 (aged 17)
	Vyacheslav Darvishev	(Soviet Union)	MF	28 March 1963 (aged 19)
	Yuri Efremov	(Soviet Union)	MF	21 March 1964 (aged 18)
	Ivan Ivanchenko	(Soviet Union)	MF	8 March 1954 (aged 28)
	Viktor Nikitenko	(Soviet Union)	MF	17 April 1957 (aged 25)
Forwards
	Hennadiy Horshkov	(Soviet Union)	FW	8 January 1953 (aged 29)
	Hennadiy Chernenok	(Soviet Union)	FW	2 December 1964 (aged 17)
	Sergey Shulyakov	(Soviet Union)	FW	10 November 1964 (aged 17)

== Transfers ==
=== In ===
Date	Pos.	Player	Age	Moving from	Type	Fee	Source
Summer
5 April 1982	GK	(Soviet Union) Mikhail Moskalenko	33	(Soviet Union) Refrizherator Fastov	Transfer	Free	
5 April 1982	DF	(Soviet Union) Oleksandr Ryabokon	18	Unattached	Transfer	Free	
5 April 1982	DF	(Soviet Union) Volodymyr Ivaschenko	26	(Soviet Union) Metalurh Zaporizhzhia	Transfer	Free	
5 April 1982	MF	(Soviet Union) Svyatoslav Petrenko	20	(Soviet Union) SKA Lviv	Transfer	Free	
5 April 1982	MF	(Soviet Union) Volsky Valery	17	Unattached	Transfer	Free	
5 April 1982	MF	(Soviet Union) Vyacheslav Darvishev	19	(Soviet Union) Nyva Vinnytsia	Transfer	Free	
5 April 1982	MF	(Soviet Union) Efremov Yuri	18	(Soviet Union) Spartak Moscow	Transfer	Free	
5 April 1982	MF	(Soviet Union) Ivan Ivanchenko	28	(Soviet Union) Spartak Ivano-Frankivsk	Transfer	Free	
5 April 1982	MF	(Soviet Union) Viktor Nikitenko	25	(Soviet Union) Spartak Ivano-Frankivsk	Transfer	Free	
5 April 1982	MF	(Soviet Union) Fedor Popovich	21	(Soviet Union) CSKA Kyiv	Transfer	Free	
5 April 1982	MF	(Soviet Union) Igor Tennak	28	(Soviet Union) Hirnyk Kryvyi Rih	Transfer	Free	
5 April 1982	FW	(Soviet Union) Hennadiy Chernenok	17	(Soviet Union) Yunist Chernihiv	Transfer	Free	
5 April 1982	FW	(Soviet Union) Sergey Shulyakov	17	Unattached	Transfer	Free	

=== Out ===
Date	Pos.	Player	Age	Moving to	Type	Fee	Source
Summer
8 January 1982	DF	(Soviet Union) Oleksandr Bobaryko	24	(Soviet Union) SKA Lviv	Transfer	Free	
9 January 1982	DF	(Soviet Union) Sergey Ostap	25	(Soviet Union) Tekstylnyk Chernihiv	Transfer	Free	
9 January 1982	DF	(Soviet Union) Alexander Stetsko	18	Unattached	Transfer	Free	
9 January 1982	DF	(Soviet Union) Mykola Lytvyn	17	(Soviet Union) Tavriya Simferopol	Transfer	Free	
9 January 1982	DF	(Soviet Union) Viktor Dohadailo	21	(Soviet Union) Ocean Kerch	Transfer	Free	
9 January 1982	MF	(Soviet Union) Alexander Kochergin	17	(Soviet Union) Ocean Kerch	Transfer	Free	
9 January 1982	MF	(Soviet Union) Fedor Prikhodko	20	(Soviet Union) Kolos Nikopol	Transfer	Free	
9 January 1982	MF	(Soviet Union) Stanislav Ustich	24	Unattached	Transfer	Free	
9 January 1982	MF	(Soviet Union) Anatoly Veretinsky	26	Unattached	Transfer	Free	
9 January 1982	MF	(Soviet Union) Oleh Kuzmenko	12	Unattached	Transfer	Free	
9 January 1982	MF	(Soviet Union) Sergey Khamzin	18	Unattached	Transfer	Free	
10 January 1982	MF	(Soviet Union) Yuri Voronkov	26	(Soviet Union) Dnipro Zhlobin	Transfer	Free	
10 January 1982	MF	(Soviet Union) Svyatoslav Petrenko	20	(Soviet Union) SKA Lviv	Transfer	Free	
11 January 1982	FW	(Soviet Union) Volodymyr Hrytsai	23	(Soviet Union) Khorazm	Transfer	Free	

== Pre-season and friendlies ==
Win Draw Loss

28 May 1982 Friendly	Chernihiv (Ukraine)	0–2	(Ukraine) Dynamo Kyiv
EET (UTC+02:00)		Report

== Competitions ==
=== Overall ===
Competition	First match	Last match	Starting round	Final position	Record							
Competition	First match	Last match	Starting round	Final position	Pld	W	D	L	GF	GA	GD	Win %
Soviet Second League	4 April 1982	19 October 1982	Matchday 1	(2nd) Runner-Up	46	26	10	10	64	37	+27	56.52
Total					46	26	10	10	64	37	+27	56.52

Last updated: 12 November 2026
Source: Competitions

=== Soviet Second League ===
==== League table ====
Pos	Team	Pld	W	D	L	GF	GA	GD	Pts	Qualification or relegation
1	Bukovyna Chernivtsi (C, Q)	46	29	8	9	71	34	+37	66	Qualified for interzonal competitions among other Zone winners
2	Desna Chernihiv	46	26	10	10	64	37	+27	62	
3	Kolos Mezhyrich	46	26	10	10	60	39	+21	62	
4	Avanhard Rivne	46	25	11	10	65	34	+31	61	
5	Nyva Vinnytsia	46	23	13	10	69	36	+33	59	
6	Atlantyka Sevastopol	46	22	12	12	68	39	+29	56	
7	Spartak Zhytomyr	46	23	8	15	68	46	+22	54	
8	Dnipro Cherkasy	46	21	12	13	54	42	+12	54	
9	Shakhtar Horlivka	46	19	12	15	61	57	+4	50	
10	Kryvbas Kryvyi Rih	46	20	9	17	50	48	+2	49	
11	Sudnobudivnyk Mykolaiv	46	16	12	18	56	48	+8	44	
12	Metalurh Dniprodzerzhynsk	46	17	9	20	47	47	0	43	
13	Prykarpattia Ivano-Frankivsk	46	17	8	21	41	58	−17	42	
14	Torpedo Lutsk	46	16	9	21	49	60	−11	41	
15	Zirka Kirovohrad	46	17	5	24	43	63	−20	39	
16	Mayak Kharkiv	46	14	10	22	52	65	−13	38	
17	Zakarpattia Uzhhorod	46	14	8	24	37	53	−16	36	
18	Stakhonovets Stakhanov	46	13	10	23	40	54	−14	36	
19	Krystal Kherson	46	12	12	22	41	64	−23	36	
20	Podillia Khmelnytskyi	46	12	12	22	37	62	−25	36	
21	Frunzenets Sumy	46	12	12	22	38	62	−24	36	
22	Novator Zhdanov	46	13	9	24	44	60	−16	35	
23	Okean Kerch	46	12	11	23	43	67	−24	35	
24	Kolos Poltava (R)	46	10	14	22	21	44	−23	34	Relegated

(C) Champions; (Q) Qualified for the phase indicated; (R) Relegated

=== Soviet Second League, Zone 6 ===
4 April 1982 1	Sudnobudivnyk Mykolaiv	0–0	Desna Chernihiv	Mykolaiv
19:00 EEST (UTC+03:00)		Report		Stadium: Tsentralnyi Stadion

8 April 1982 2	Krystal Kherson	0–1	Desna Chernihiv	Krystal
19:00 EEST (UTC+03:00)		Report		Stadium: Krystal Stadium

13 April 1982 3	Desna Chernihiv	0–0	Bukovyna Chernivtsi	Chernihiv
19:00 EEST (UTC+03:00)		Report		Stadium: Chernihiv Stadium

16 April 1982 4	Desna Chernihiv	3–0	Podillia Khmelnytskyi	Chernihiv
19:00 EEST (UTC+03:00)		Report		Stadium: Chernihiv Stadium

24 April 1982 5	Metalurh Dniprodzerzhynsk	2–1	Desna Chernihiv	Kamianske
19:00 EEST (UTC+03:00)		Report		Stadium: Metalurh Stadium

27 April 1982 6	Kolos Mezhyrich	1–0	Desna Chernihiv	Pavlohrad
19:00 EEST (UTC+03:00)		Report		Stadium: Shakhtar Stadium

3 May 1982 7	Desna Chernihiv	2–0	Frunzenets Sumy	Chernihiv
19:00 EEST (UTC+03:00)		Report		Stadium: Chernihiv Stadium

7 May 1982 8	Desna Chernihiv	2–0	Dnipro Cherkasy	Chernihiv
19:00 EEST (UTC+03:00)		Report		Stadium: Chernihiv Stadium

10 May 1982 9	Desna Chernihiv	1–0	Kolos Poltava	Chernihiv
19:00 EEST (UTC+03:00)		Report		Stadium: Chernihiv Stadium

15 May 1982 10	Zakarpattia Uzhhorod	1–0	Desna Chernihiv	Uzhhorod
19:00 EEST (UTC+03:00)		Report		Stadium: Avanhard Stadium

18 May 1982 11	Prykarpattia Ivano-Frankivsk	0–1	Desna Chernihiv	Ivano-Frankivsk
19:00 EEST (UTC+03:00)		Report		Stadium: MCS Rukh

24 May 1982 12	Desna Chernihiv	3–1	Kryvbas Kryvyi Rih	Chernihiv
19:00 EEST (UTC+03:00)		Report		Stadium: Chernihiv Stadium

27 May 1982 13	Desna Chernihiv	1–0	Zirka Kirovohrad	Chernihiv
19:00 EEST (UTC+03:00)		Report		Stadium: Chernihiv Stadium

3 June 1982 14	Novator Zhdanov	1–1	Desna Chernihiv	Zhdanov
19:00 EEST (UTC+03:00)		Report		Stadium: Novator Stadium

6 June 1982 15	Shakhtar Horlivka	3–0	Desna Chernihiv	Horlivka
19:00 EEST (UTC+03:00)		Report		Stadium: Shakhtar Stadium

10 June 1982 16	Desna Chernihiv	2–1	Avanhard Rivne	Chernihiv
19:00 EEST (UTC+03:00)		Report		Stadium: Chernihiv Stadium

15 June 1982 17	Desna Chernihiv	0–0	Torpedo Lutsk	Chernihiv
19:00 EEST (UTC+03:00)		Report		Stadium: Chernihiv Stadium

15 June 1982 18	Desna Chernihiv	3–1	Mayak Kharkiv	Chernihiv
19:00 EEST (UTC+03:00)		Report		Stadium: Chernihiv Stadium

21 June 1982 19	Desna Chernihiv	3–1	Stakhonovets Stakhanov	Chernihiv
19:00 EEST (UTC+03:00)		Report		Stadium: Chernihiv Stadium

27 June 1982 20	Nyva Vinnytsia	1–1	Desna Chernihiv	Vinnytsia
19:00 EEST (UTC+03:00)		Report		Stadium: Tsentralnyi Stadion

27 June 1982 21	Spartak Zhytomyr	4–0	Desna Chernihiv	Zhytomyr
19:00 EEST (UTC+03:00)		Report		Stadium: Tsentralnyi Stadion

6 July 1982 22	Desna Chernihiv	0–2	Atlantyka Sevastopol	Chernihiv
19:00 EEST (UTC+03:00)		Report		Stadium: Chernihiv Stadium

9 July 1982 23	Desna Chernihiv	3–0	Okean Kerch	Chernihiv
19:00 EEST (UTC+03:00)		Report		Stadium: Chernihiv Stadium

18 July 1982 24	Atlantyka Sevastopol	1–0	Desna Chernihiv	Sevastopol
19:00 EEST (UTC+03:00)		Report		Stadium: Sports Complex Sevastopol

21 July 1982 25	Okean Kerch	3–3	Desna Chernihiv	Kerch
19:00 EEST (UTC+03:00)		Report		Stadium: 50th Anniversary of October Stadium

26 July 1982 26	Desna Chernihiv	3–0	Nyva Vinnytsia	Chernihiv
19:00 EEST (UTC+03:00)		Report		Stadium: Chernihiv Stadium

5 August 1982 27	Mayak Kharkiv	1–2	Desna Chernihiv	Kharkiv
19:00 EEST (UTC+03:00)		Report		Stadium: KhTZ Stadium

8 August 1982 28	Stakhonovets Stakhanov	0–2	Desna Chernihiv	Stakhanov
19:00 EEST (UTC+03:00)		Report		Stadium: Peremoha Stadium

12 August 1982 29	Frunzenets Sumy	0–1	Desna Chernihiv	Sumy
19:00 EEST (UTC+03:00)		Report		Stadium: Yuvileiny Stadium

18 August 1982 30	Avanhard Rivne	0–0	Desna Chernihiv	Rivne
19:00 EEST (UTC+03:00)		Report		Stadium: Avanhard Stadium

21 August 1982 31	Torpedo Lutsk	0–3	Desna Chernihiv	Lutsk
19:00 EEST (UTC+03:00)		Report		Stadium: Avanhard Stadium

26 August 1982 32	Desna Chernihiv	1–0	Novator Zhdanov	Chernihiv
19:00 EEST (UTC+03:00)		Report		Stadium: Chernihiv Stadium

29 August 1982 33	Desna Chernihiv	2–0	Shakhtar Horlivka	Chernihiv
19:00 EEST (UTC+03:00)		Report		Stadium: Chernihiv Stadium

3 September 1982 34	Kryvbas Kryvyi Rih	1–0	Desna Chernihiv	Kryvyi Rih
19:00 EEST (UTC+03:00)		Report		Stadium: Metalurh Stadium

6 September 1982 35	Zirka Kirovohrad	1–0	Desna Chernihiv	Kropyvnytskyi
19:00 EEST (UTC+03:00)		Report		Stadium: Zirka Stadium

13 September 1982 36	Desna Chernihiv	0–0	Zakarpattia Uzhhorod	Chernihiv
19:00 EEST (UTC+03:00)		Report		Stadium: Chernihiv Stadium

16 September 1982 37	Desna Chernihiv	3–1	Prykarpattia Ivano-Frankivsk	Chernihiv
19:00 EEST (UTC+03:00)		Report		Stadium: Chernihiv Stadium

21 September 1982 38	Dnipro Cherkasy	0–0	Desna Chernihiv	Cherkasy
19:00 EEST (UTC+03:00)		Report		Stadium: Tsentralnyi Stadion

24 September 1982 39	Kolos Poltava	0–0	Desna Chernihiv	Poltava
19:00 EEST (UTC+03:00)		Report		Stadium: Kolos Stadium

30 September 1982 40	Desna Chernihiv	3–1	Metalurh Dniprodzerzhynsk	Chernihiv
19:00 EEST (UTC+03:00)		Report		Stadium: Chernihiv Stadium

3 October 1982 41	Desna Chernihiv	2–0	Kolos Mezhyrich	Chernihiv
19:00 EEST (UTC+03:00)		Report		Stadium: Chernihiv Stadium

8 October 1982 42	Bukovyna Chernivtsi	1–2	Desna Chernihiv	Chernivtsi
19:00 EEST (UTC+03:00)		Report		Stadium: Bukovyna Stadium

11 October 1982 43	Podillia Khmelnytskyi	2–1	Desna Chernihiv	Khmelnytskyi
19:00 EEST (UTC+03:00)		Report		Stadium: Podillia Stadium

16 October 1982 44	Desna Chernihiv	2–1	Sudnobudivnyk Mykolaiv	Chernihiv
19:00 EEST (UTC+03:00)		Report		Stadium: Chernihiv Stadium

19 October 1982 45	Desna Chernihiv	3–2	Krystal Kherson	Chernihiv
19:00 EEST (UTC+03:00)		Report		Stadium: Chernihiv Stadium

22 October 1982 46	Desna Chernihiv	2–1	Spartak Zhytomyr	Chernihiv
19:00 EEST (UTC+03:00)		Report		Stadium: Chernihiv Stadium

== Statistics ==
=== Appearances and goals ===
No.	Pos	Nat	Player	Total		Soviet Second League		Cup of the Ukrainian SSR		Play-offs	
No.	Pos	Nat	Player	Apps	Goals	Apps	Goals	Apps	Goals	Apps	Goals
Goalkeepers
	GK	(Soviet Union) URS	Serhiy Umen	10	0	10	0	0	0	0	0
	GK	(Soviet Union) URS	Mikhail Moskalenko	41	0	41	0	0	0	0	0
	GK	(Soviet Union) URS	Vyacheslav Kiselev	0	0	0	0	0	0	0	0
Defenders }
	DF	(Soviet Union) URS	Vladimir Hlukhov	40	4	40	4	0	0	0	0
	DF	(Soviet Union) URS	Nikolay Lipoviy	0	0	0	0	0	0	0	0
	DF	(Soviet Union) URS	Serhiy Sapronov	28	0	28	0	0	0	0	0
	DF	(Soviet Union) URS	Oleksandr Ryabokon	0	0	0	0	0	0	0	0
	DF	(Soviet Union) URS	Vladimir Ivaschenko	37	0	37	0	0	0	0	0
Midfielders
	MF	(Soviet Union) URS	Oleh Kuznetsov	44	0	44	0	0	0	0	0
	MF	(Soviet Union) URS	Fedor Popovich	3	0	3	0	0	0	0	0
	MF	(Soviet Union) URS	Igor Tennak	44	2	44	2	0	0	0	0
	MF	(Soviet Union) URS	Viktor Danilevsky	39	2	39	2	0	0	0	0
	MF	(Soviet Union) URS	Valery Volsky	9	0	9	0	0	0	0	0
	MF	(Soviet Union) URS	Vyacheslav Darvishev	2	0	2	0	0	0	0	0
	MF	(Soviet Union) URS	Yuri Efremov	10	1	10	1	0	0	0	0
	MF	(Soviet Union) URS	Ivan Ivanchenko	44	10	44	10	0	0	0	0
	MF	(Soviet Union) URS	Valentyn Buhlak	42	4	42	4	0	0	0	0
	MF	(Soviet Union) URS	Vyacheslav Kislenko	41	0	41	0	0	0	0	0
	MF	(Soviet Union) URS	Svyatoslav Petrenko	18	5	18	5	0	0	0	0
	MF	(Soviet Union) URS	Viktor Rudyi	43	10	43	10	0	0	0	0
	MF	(Soviet Union) URS	Viktor Nikitenko	43	6	43	6	0	0	0	0
Forwards
	FW	(Soviet Union) URS	Hennadiy Horshkov	42	14	42	14	0	0	0	0
	FW	(Soviet Union) URS	Hennadiy Chernenok	10	6	10	6	0	0	0	0
	FW	(Soviet Union) URS	Sergey Shulyakov	2	1	2	1	0	0	0	0

Source: Competitions

Last updated: 12 November 2026

=== Goalscorers ===
Rank	No.	Pos	Nat	Name	Soviet Second League	Cup of the Ukrainian SSR	Play-offs	Total
1		FW	(Soviet Union)	Hennadiy Horshkov	14	0	0	14
2		MF	(Soviet Union)	Viktor Rudyi	10	0	0	10
3		MF	(Soviet Union)	Ivan Ivanchenko	10	0	0	10
4		FW	(Soviet Union)	Hennadiy Chernenok	6	0	0	6
5		MF	(Soviet Union)	Viktor Nikitenko	6	0	0	6
6		MF	(Soviet Union)	Svyatoslav Petrenko	5	0	0	5
7		MF	(Soviet Union)	Valentyn Buhlak	4	0	0	4
8		DF	(Soviet Union)	Vladimir Hlukhov	4	0	0	4
9		MF	(Soviet Union)	Viktor Danilevsky	2	0	0	2
10		MF	(Soviet Union)	Igor Tennak	2	0	0	2
11		MF	(Soviet Union)	Yuri Efremov	1	0	0	1
12		FW	(Soviet Union)	Sergey Shulyakov	1	0	0	1
				Total	65	0	0	65

Last updated: 12 November 2026
