= Oleh Kuznetsov =

Ukrainian footballer (born 1963)

Oleh Kuznetsov Олег Кузнєцов
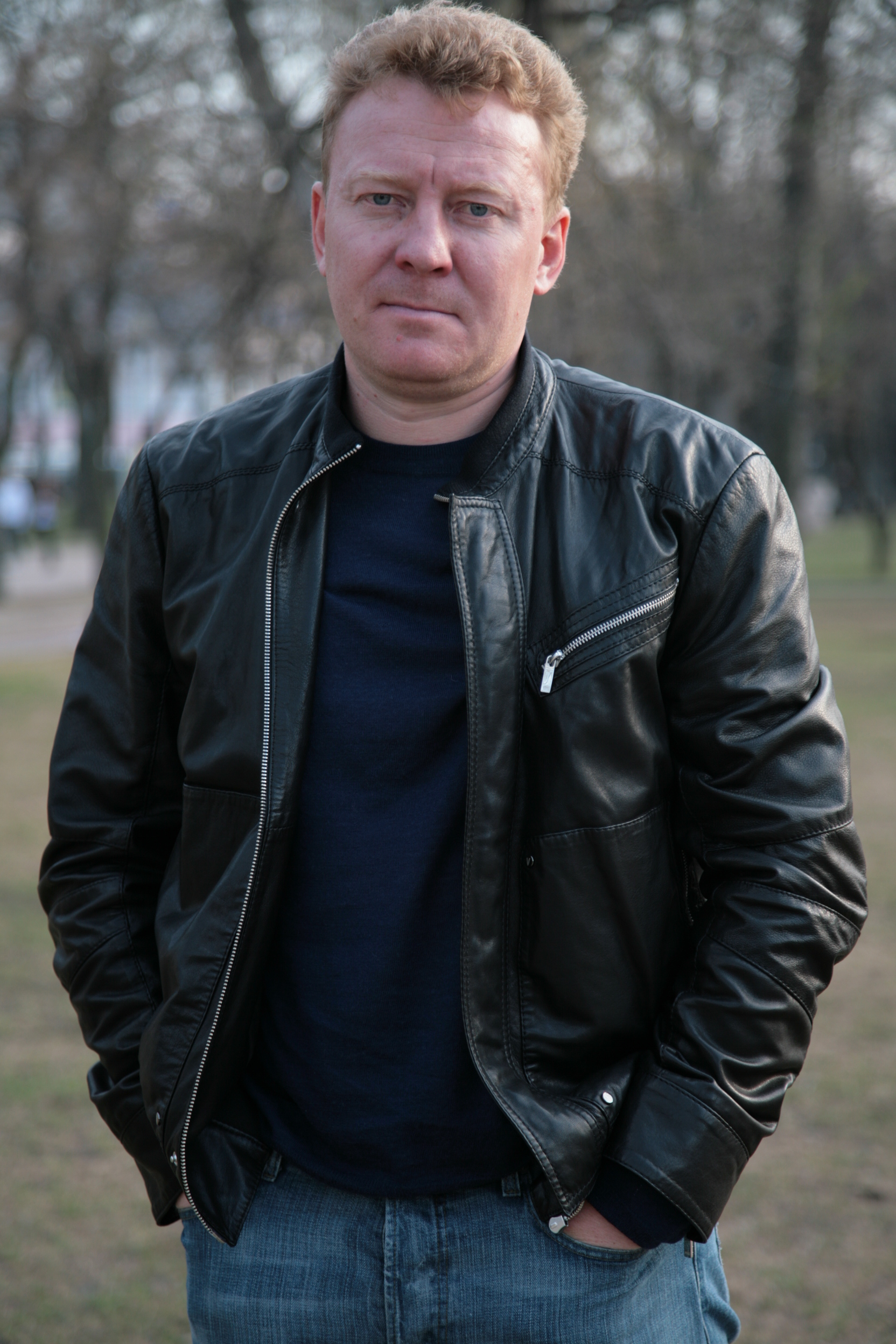

Personal information
- Full name: Oleg Wladimirowitsch Kuznetsow - Oleh Volodymyrovych Kuznetsov
- Date of birth: 22 March 1963 (age 63)
- Place of birth: Magdeburg, East Germany
- Height: 1.84 m (6 ft 0 in)
- Position: Central defender

Youth career
- 1971–1980: SDYuShOR Desna

Senior career*
Years	Team	Apps	(Gls)
1981–1982	Desna Chernihiv	86	(0)
1983–1990	Dynamo Kyiv	181	(5)
1990–1994	Rangers	35	(1)
1994–1995	Maccabi Haifa	6	(0)
1995–1997	CSKA-Borysfen Kyiv	11	(1)
Total		247	(7)

International career
1986–1991	USSR	58	(1)
1992	CIS	5	(0)
1992–1994	Ukraine	3	(0)

Managerial career
- 1998–2001: CSKA Kyiv (assistant)
- 2001–2002: Arsenal Kyiv
- 2002–2004: Dynamo Kyiv (assistant)
- 2002–2007: Ukraine (assistant)
- 2008: Moscow (assistant)
- 2010: Ukraine U17
- 2011: Ukraine U18
- 2012: Ukraine U19
- 2013: Ukraine U16
- 2014: Ukraine U17
- 2015: Ukraine U18
- 2016: Ukraine U19
- 2017: Ukraine U16
- 2018: Ukraine U17
- 2019: Ukraine U18
- 2020: Ukraine U19
- 2021–2023: Ukraine U16
- 2023: Ukraine U19
Medal record
Representing Soviet Union
UEFA European Championship
Runner-up	1988 West Germany
- * Club domestic league appearances and goals

Oleh Volodymyrovych Kuznetsov (born as Oleg Wladimirowitsch Kuznetsow in Germany) (Ukrainian: Олег Володимирович Кузнєцов) (born 22 March 1963) is a Ukrainian football coach and former professional player. He won domestic honours in the Soviet Union with Dynamo Kyiv (as well as the UEFA Cup Winners Cup in 1986), in Scotland with Rangers, in Israel with Maccabi Haifa and in Ukraine with CSKA-Borysfen Kyiv. Kuznetsov won 58 caps for the USSR national team between 1986 and 1991, being suspended for the final of UEFA Euro 1988 then was also selected for its successors, the CIS (five caps) and Ukraine (three caps).

== Club career ==
=== Desna Chernihiv ===
Kuznetsov was born in Magdeburg, East Germany into a military family stationed in East Germany. His family returned to their native Ukraine and the town of Chernihiv when his father retired from the army and got a job as an engineer at a local radio plant. His mother worked as an engineer in a construction and design institute, from where she retired. Kuznetsov started playing when he was eight years old with local football schools before signing for the city's professional club Desna Chernihiv in 1980, continuing to improve his technique and tactics under the guidance of coach Yukhym Shkolnykov. He made 86 appearances for Desna and helped the team to finish twelfth in the Soviet Second League (Zone 5) in the 1981 season, improving to second place in the 1982 season (Zone 6).

=== Dynamo Kyiv ===
After a successful 1982 season, Kuznetsov moved to Dynamo Kyiv where he remained until September 1990. He won the Soviet Top League in 1985, 1986 and 1990, the Soviet Cup in 1985, 1987 and 1990, and the UEFA Cup Winners' Cup in 1985–86. He became regarded as one of the best defenders in Europe in the second half of the 1980s, known for his strong ball-winning skills and long-range shooting power.

=== Rangers ===
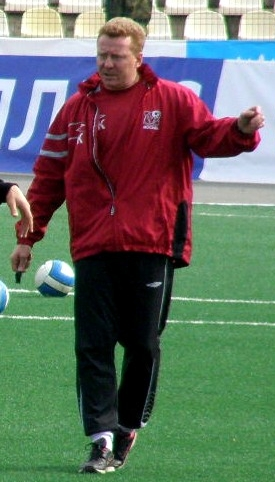
during a coaching session at FC Moscow in 2008

Kuznetsov transferred to Scottish club Rangers in 1990. He injured his cruciate ligament in his second game (against St Johnstone) and did not play again for a full year. New defensive players were brought in during his layoff such as Dave McPherson, and he was never a first choice again. A year after his arrival another Ukrainian, his former Dynamo Kyiv teammate Oleksiy Mykhaylychenko, joined the club, but they only played in 20 matches together across three seasons. He moved on in 1994 after a four-year stint badly hampered by injuries, with Basile Boli coming to Glasgow to take his place in the squad.

=== Maccabi Haifa ===
After being released by Rangers, Kuznetsov played for one season in Israel with Maccabi Haifa, winning the 1994–95 Israel State Cup and finishing runners-up in the 1994–95 Liga Leumit.

=== CSKA-Borysfen Kyiv ===
Kuznetsov returned to Ukraine to finish his career with CSKA-Borysfen Kyiv. In 1995–96 he won the Ukrainian Second League to achieve promotion to the Ukrainian First League.

== International career ==
He appeared in 58 games for the USSR national team (one goal), five times for the interim CIS after the fall of the Soviet Union and three times for the independent Ukraine side. He claimed a silver medal with the USSR at Euro 1988, and also appeared for them at the 1986 and 1990 FIFA World Cups; On 9 September 1990, he scored his only goal for the USSR in a 2–0 win against Norway in UEFA Euro 1992 qualifying at the Central Lenin Stadium in Moscow; subsequently he played for the CIS at Euro 1992 Finals.

== Coaching career ==
Kuznetsov began coaching in 1998 at the last club he played for professionally, CSKA Kyiv. Starting out as an assistant coach, he became head coach for the 2001–2002 season (with CSKA Kyiv becoming Arsenal Kyiv in the meantime).

He moved to the coaching staff at Dynamo Kyiv and later had several roles with the Ukraine national team, including as a member of the staff with the senior squad that reached the quarter-finals of the 2006 FIFA World Cup in Germany, and taking charge of various youth age group teams over the next decade.

== Career statistics ==
=== Club ===
Appearances and goals by club, season and competition
Club	Season	League			Cup		Europe		Other		Total	
Club	Season	Division	Apps	Goals	Apps	Goals	Apps	Goals	Apps	Goals	Apps	Goals
Desna Chernihiv	1981	Soviet Second League	42	0	0	0	0	0	0	0	42	0
Desna Chernihiv	1982	Soviet Second League	44	0	0	0	0	0	0	0	44	0
Dynamo Kyiv	1983	Soviet Top League	11	0	0	0	0	0	0	0	11	0
Dynamo Kyiv	1984	Soviet Top League	15	2	3	0	0	0	0	0	18	2
Dynamo Kyiv	1985	Soviet Top League	29	1	5	0	0	0	0	0	34	1
Dynamo Kyiv	1986	Soviet Top League	27	2	2	0	0	0	0	0	29	2
Dynamo Kyiv	1987	Soviet Top League	24	3	5	1	6	0	0	0	35	4
Dynamo Kyiv	1988	Soviet Top League	26	1	4	1	0	0	0	0	30	2
Dynamo Kyiv	1989	Soviet Top League	29	4	5	0	6	0	0	0	40	4
Dynamo Kyiv	1990	Soviet Top League	20	2	5	1	0	0	0	0	25	3
Rangers	1990–91	Scottish Football League	2	0	0	0	0	0	0	0	2	0
Rangers	1991–92	Scottish Football League	18	0	0	0	1	0	0	0	19	0
Rangers	1992–93	Scottish Football League	9	0	0	0	0	0	0	0	9	0
Rangers	1993–94	Scottish Football League	6	1	0	0	0	0	0	0	6	1
Maccabi Haifa	1994–95	Liga Leumit	6	0	0	0	2	0	0	0	8	0
CSKA-Borysfen Kyiv	1995–96	Ukrainian Second League	18	3	0	0	0	0	0	0	18	3
CSKA-Borysfen Kyiv	1996–97	Ukrainian First League	11	1	0	0	1	0	0	0	12	1
Career total			337	20	29	3	17	0	0	0	374	23

== Honours ==
=== Player ===
FC Desna Chernihiv

- Championship of the Ukrainian SSR: Runner-up 1982

Dynamo Kyiv

- UEFA Cup Winners' Cup: 1985–86
- Soviet Top League: 1985, 1986, 1990
- Soviet Cup: 1985, 1987, 1990

Rangers

- Scottish Premier Division: 1990–91, 1991–92, 1992–93, 1993–94
- Scottish League Cup: 1990–91, 1992–93, 1993–94
- Scottish Cup: 1991–92

CSKA Kyiv

- Ukrainian Second League: 1995–96

Soviet Union

- European Football Championship: Runner-up 1988

Individual

Ballon d'Or

- 1988 – 11th
- 1989 – 17th

Others

- Onze Mondial: 1987, 1988
