= FC Lehenda-ShVSM Chernihiv =

Ukrainian women's association football club

Lehenda-ShVSM Chernihiv
- Full name: Football Club Lehenda-ShVSM Chernihiv
- Founded: 1987
- Dissolved: 2018
- Ground: Lokomotiv stadium, Chernihiv; Tekstylschyk stadium, Chernihiv; Chernihiv Arena, Chernihiv
- Capacity: 2 000
- Chairman: (Ukraine) Volodymyr Maherramov
- Manager: (Ukraine) Serhiy Sapronov
- League: Ukrainian Women's League
- 2010: 1st
Home colours	Away colours

Lehenda-ShVSM Chernihiv (Ukrainian: "Легенда-ШВСМ" Чернігів) was a Ukrainian professional women's football club from Chernihiv, Ukraine. In 2018, it merged with Yednist Plysky as Yednist-ShVSM Plysky. In 2010–2014, the club was a leader in Ukrainian club football, holding the most national titles (6) at the time.

The ShVSM abbreviation stands for School of Higher Sports Mastery (Ukrainian: Школа Вищої Спортивної Майстерності).

== History ==
=== Origin during the Soviet era ===
Initially, the team was named SC Polissia Chernihiv. In October 1987, Mychailo Yushchenko decided to establish a women's football team at the "Polissia" gymnasium, which gave its name to the SC Polissia team. The creation of the team was supported by the local Cheksil "Worsted and Cloth Factory Combine". That's why the team used also the name Lehenda-Cheksil. The club was formed by the factory workers, as well as pupils from the city's schools No. 11 and 14, vocational school No. 13 and students from the Chernihiv Pedagogical Institute (Chernihiv Pedagogical University). At the beginning of April 1988, the team played its first match, in which it tied 2:2 with students of the Moscow Pedagogical Institute.

=== From SK Polissya Chernihiv to Lehenda Chernihiv ===
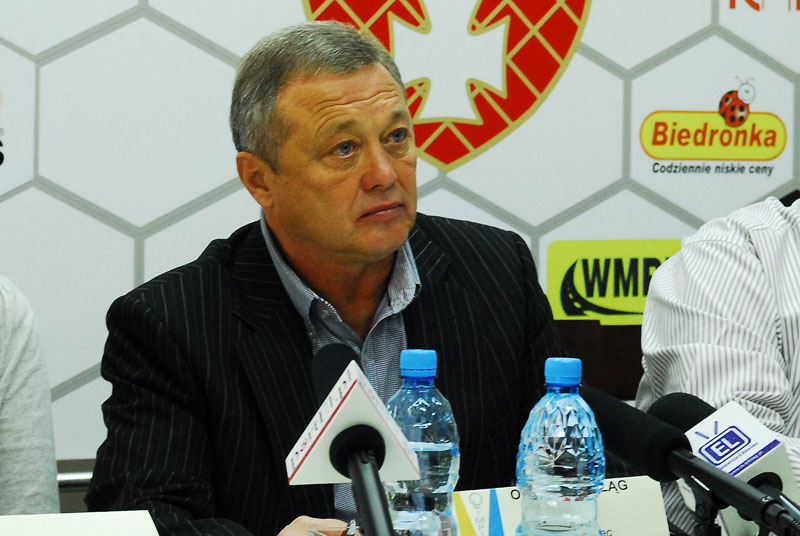
Anatoliy Piskovets, head coach of Lehenda Chernihiv from 1998 to 1999 and 2006 to 2007

In the first days of June 1988, the club was renamed Lehenda Chernihiv, taking part in amateur championships.

The first significant success of the "Lehenda" was the 3rd place in the Ukrainian Trade Unions Sports Association championship in November 1989. At the same time, the female football players made their debut in the USSR championship among Trade Union sports associations and placed 16th among 30 teams. In 1990 and 1991, there was the official Soviet women's football championship where Lehenda competed in the Higher League (top tier). In 1990 they placed 7th in their group and in 1991 6th.

After the collapse of the Soviet Union in 1992, the first league championship of Ukraine was the Ukrainian Women's League. The Lehenda football players won their first medals: bronze medals. In 1997, Lehenda's tenth anniversary was marked with its first "silver" in the national competitions. Based on the Chernihiv team, the Ukrainian youth team was established. In 1998–1999, "Lehenda" finished second, yielding the championship title to "Donchanka" Donetsk.

=== Champion of Ukrainian Women's League and Women's Cup ===
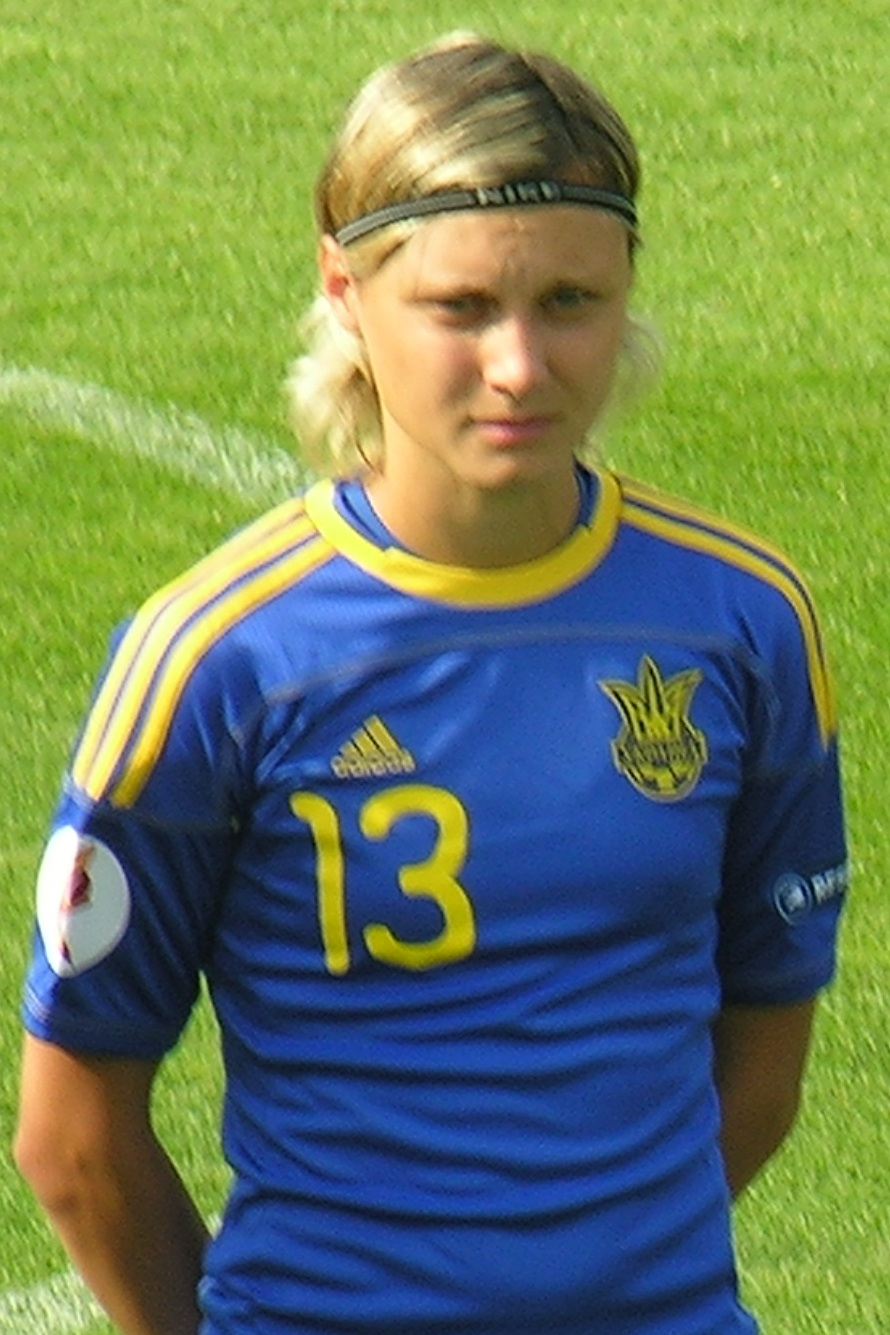
Yulia Kornievets - The best scorer in the history of Lehenda Chernihiv (148 goals in 142 matches), club record holder for the number of goals scored during the season (37) and in one game (10)

In 2000, they won their first Ukrainian Women's League title and in 2001 playing under the name Lehenda-Cheksil Chernihiv they won the Women's Cup. In 2002 they won the double, the Ukrainian Women's League and the Women's Cup and also in 2005 and 2009 they won the double in 2007 they won the Italy Women's Cup. At the European level, they came second in the group again, this time behind the Swedish club Malmö FF. The association founded a youth academy for girls aged 9 through 15 to encourage young talent. In 2009, they won both the Ukrainian Women's League and the Women's Cup, and in 2010 they won the Ukrainian Women's League. The offensive rock "Legend" has a different kind of "golden take". The team was also in UEFA Women's Champions League in the season 2011–12.

=== Recent time ===
In May 2020 Lehenda defeated Yatran-Basis from Uman in a difficult match, in the 2nd round of the Ukrainian Football Championship among women's teams at the Stadium Tekstylnyk. In the season 2017-18, the team arrived 3 in the Ukrainian Women's League behind Zhytlobud-1 Kharkiv and Zhytlobud-2 Kharkiv. After this season the team withdrew. In 2018 due to poor financing, Lehenda-ShVSM Chernihiv was merged with the recently formed Yednist Plysky women's club, therefore Ivan Bubys who previously was coaching Desna Chernihiv invited Kulyk to coach at the Skala Stryi youth academy as its under-15 boys team coach.

== Stadium and facilities ==
The matches are initially played at the Tekstylschyk Stadium in Lokomotiv Stadium and in Khimik Sport Complex. Afterwards, the team played also in the new modern Chernihiv Arena in Chernihiv, which belongs to FC Chernihiv.

== Notable players ==
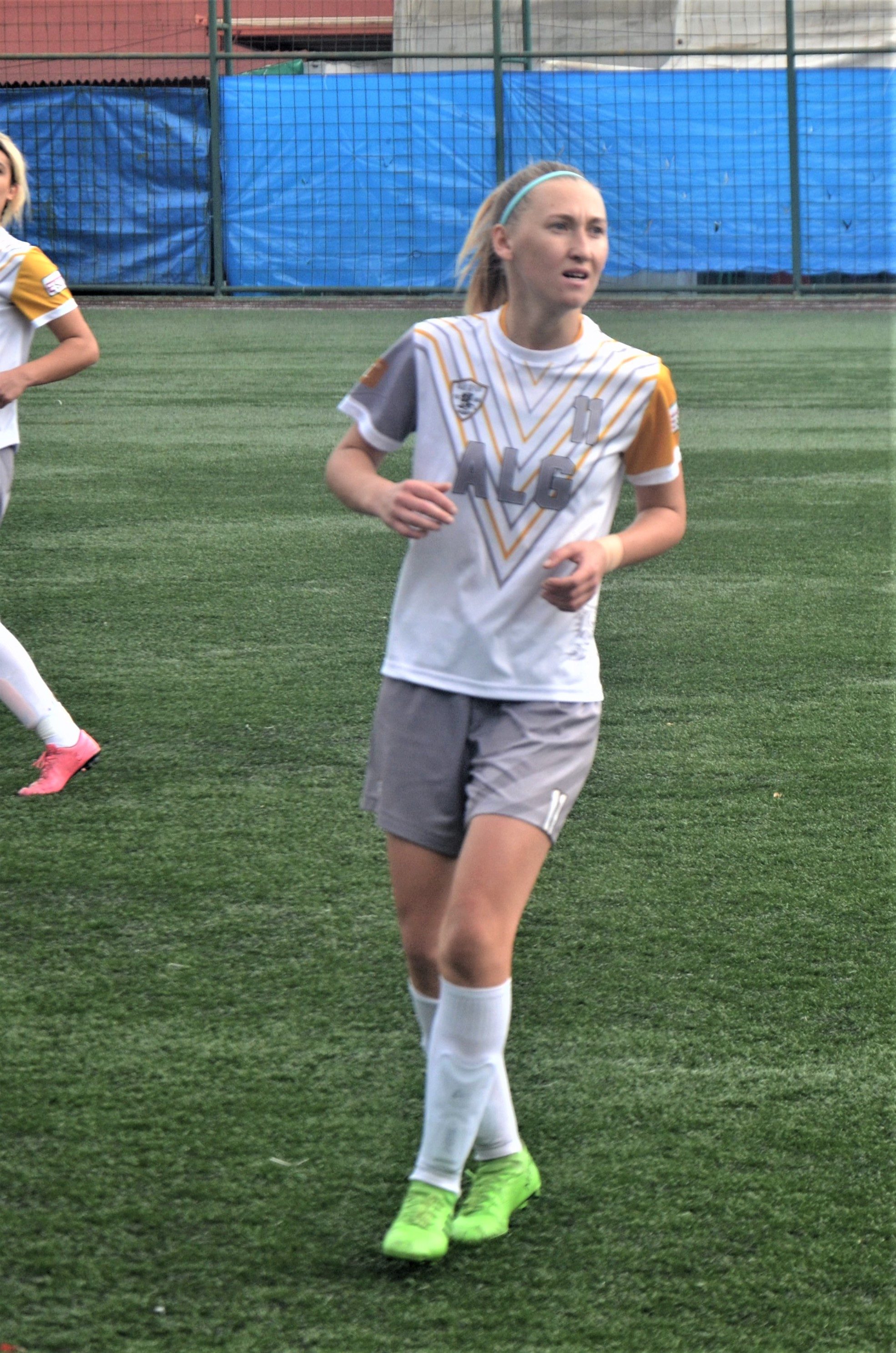
Liudmyla Shmatko

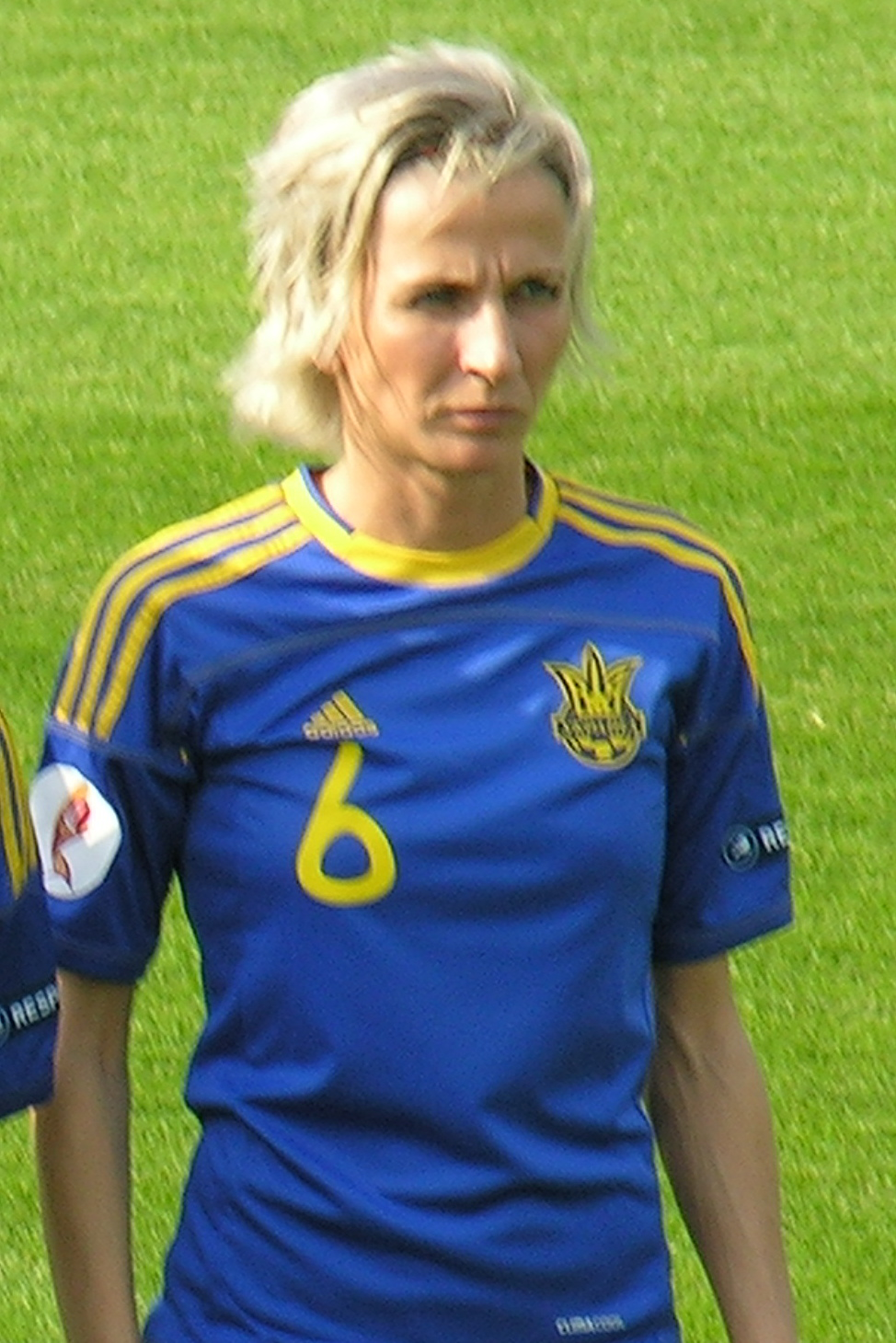
Lyudmyla Pekur

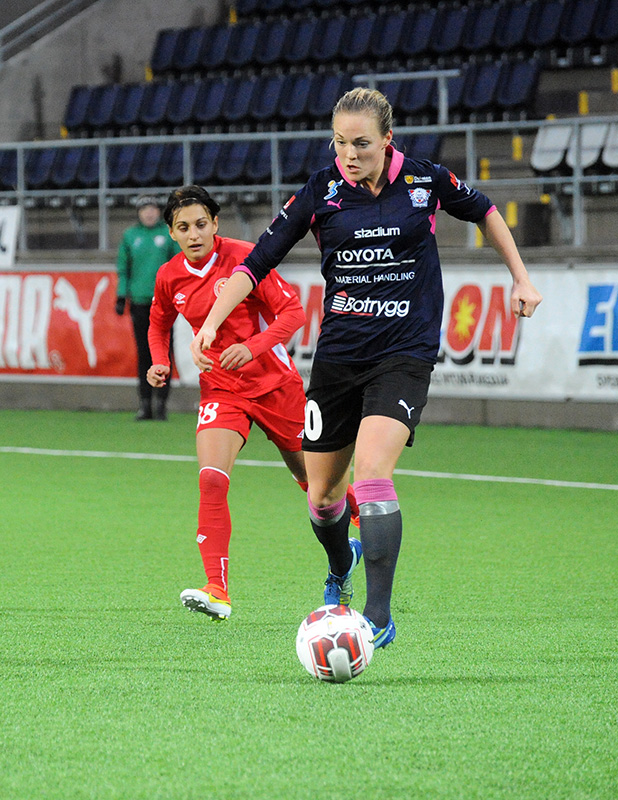
Olha Boychenko

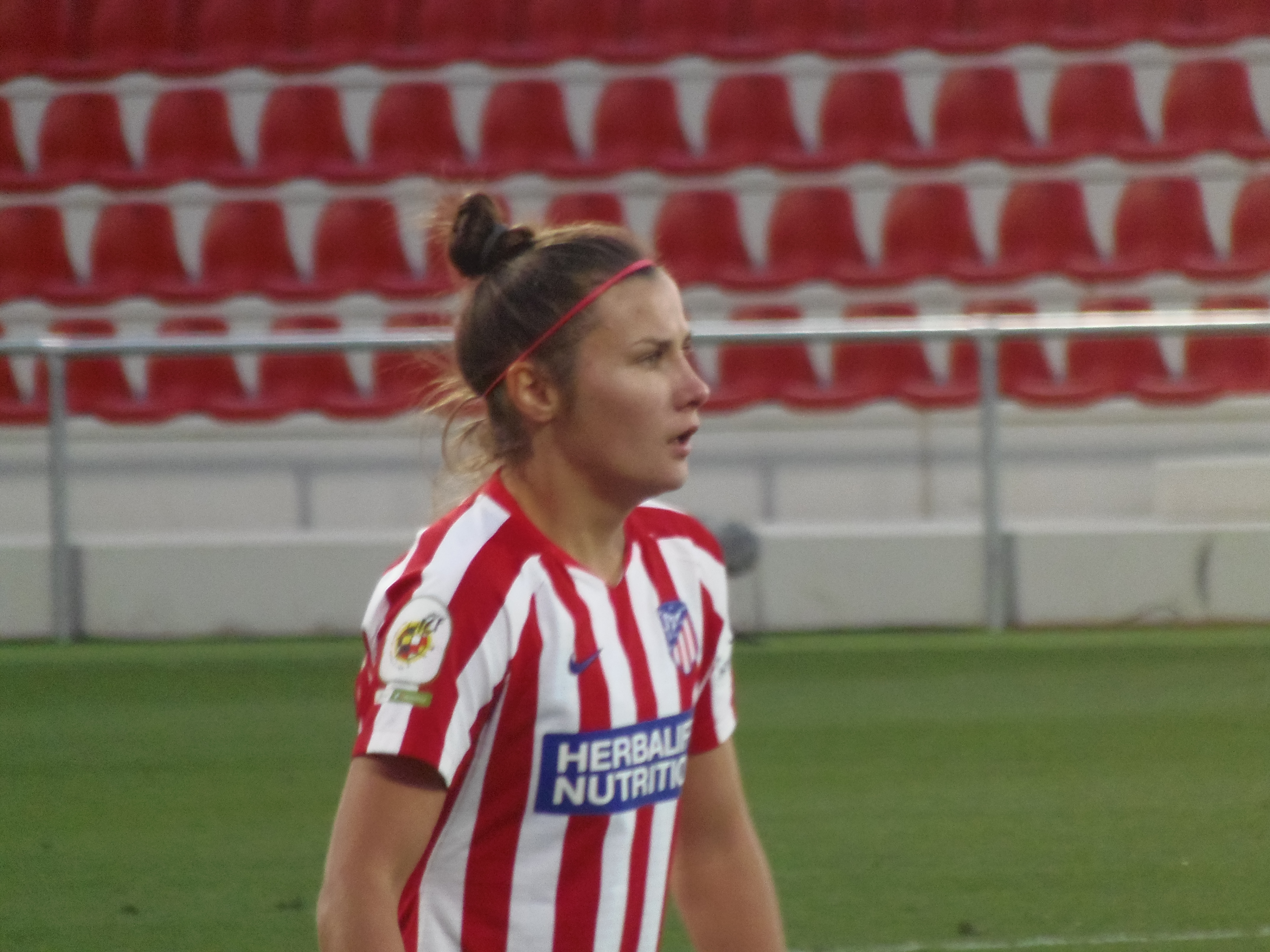
Olha Ovdiychuk

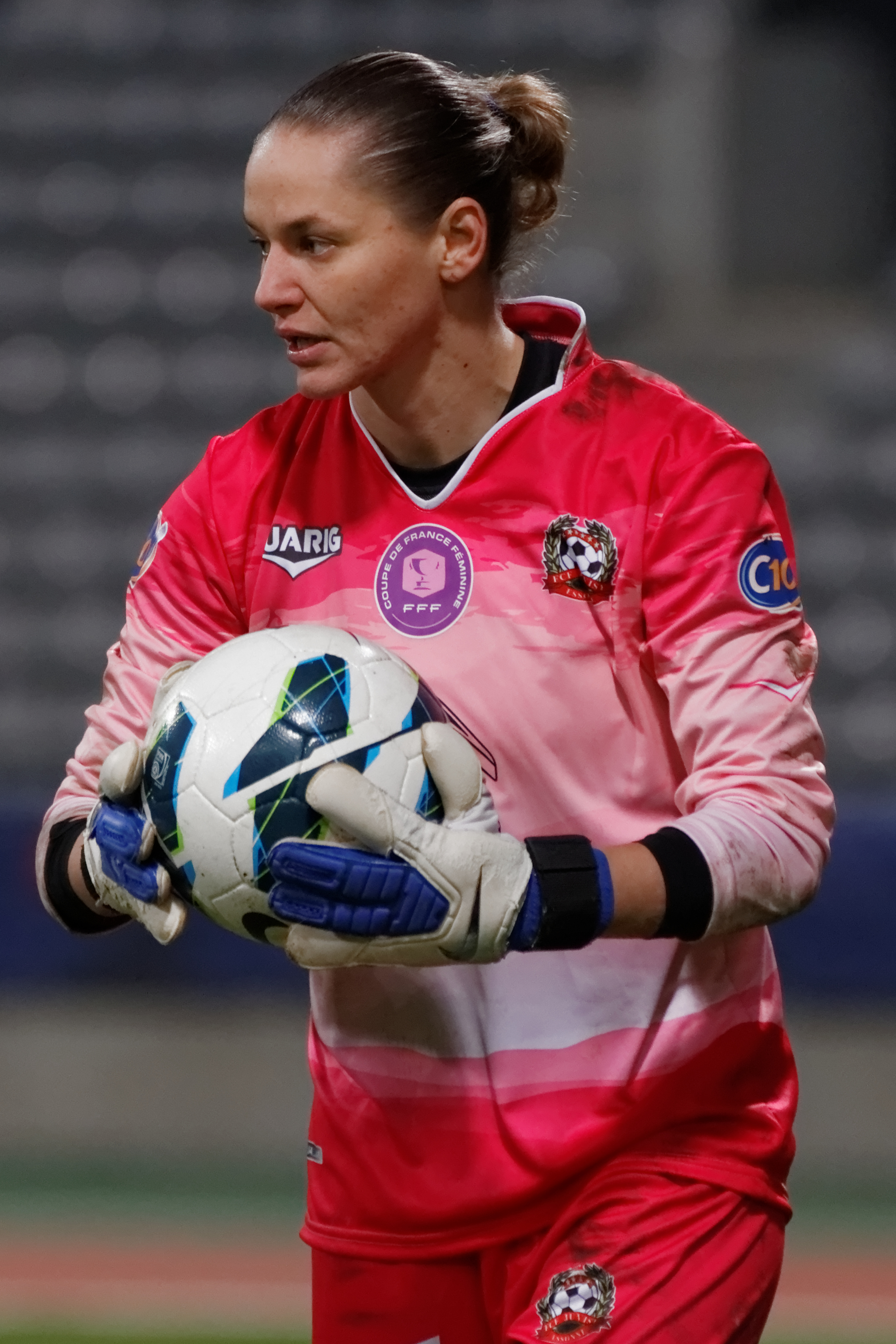
Iryna Zvarych

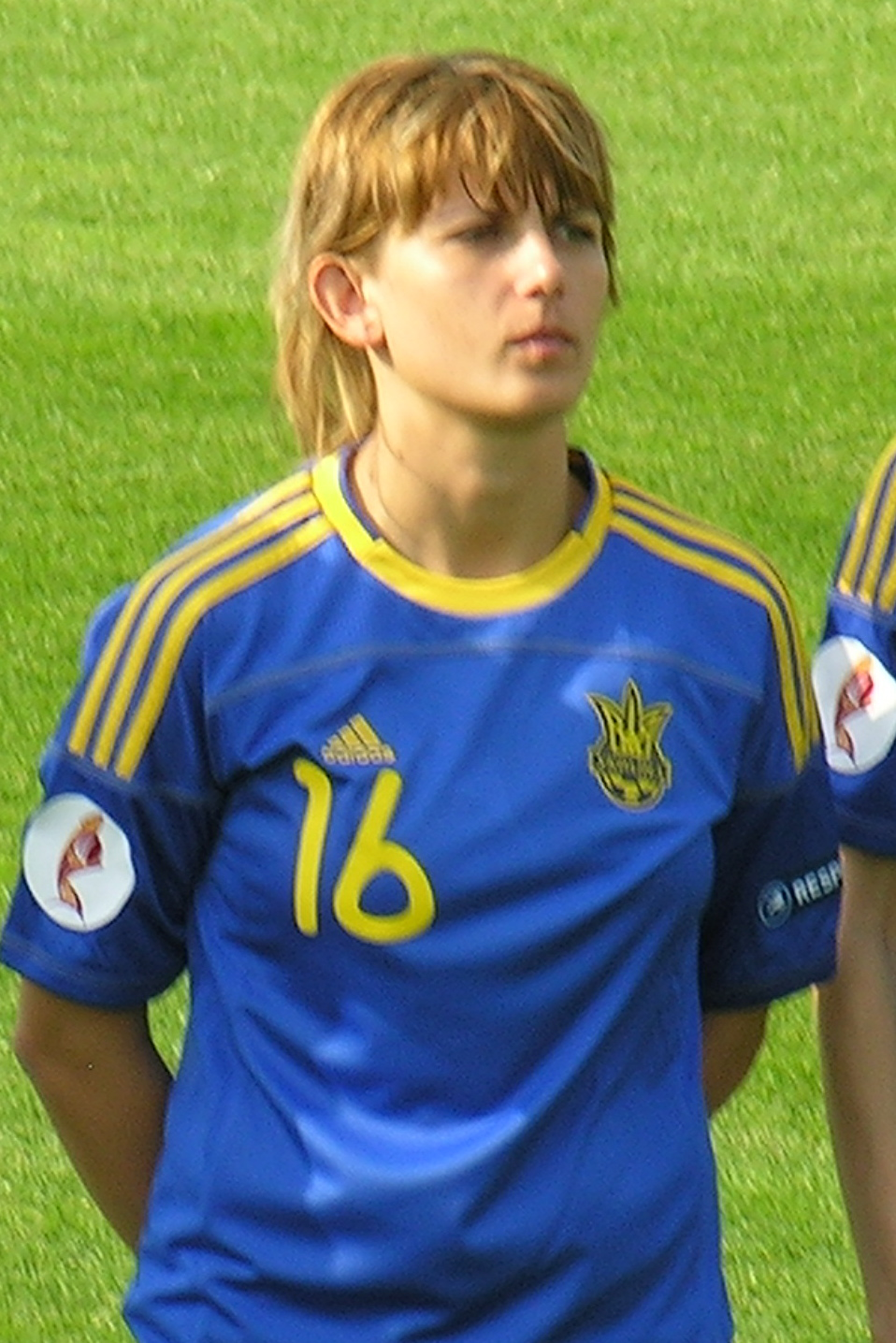
Alla Lyshafay

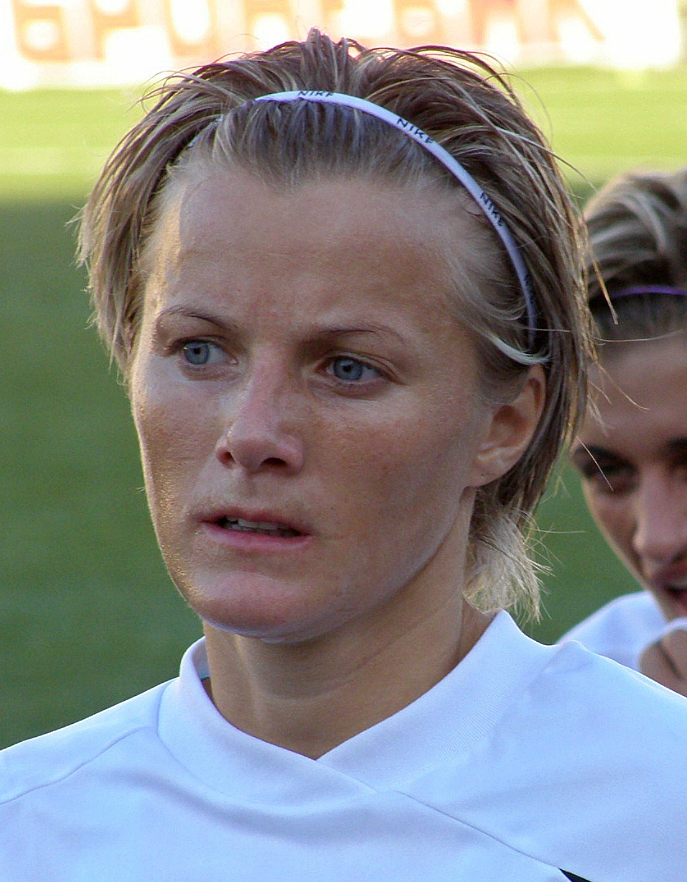
Vera Djatel

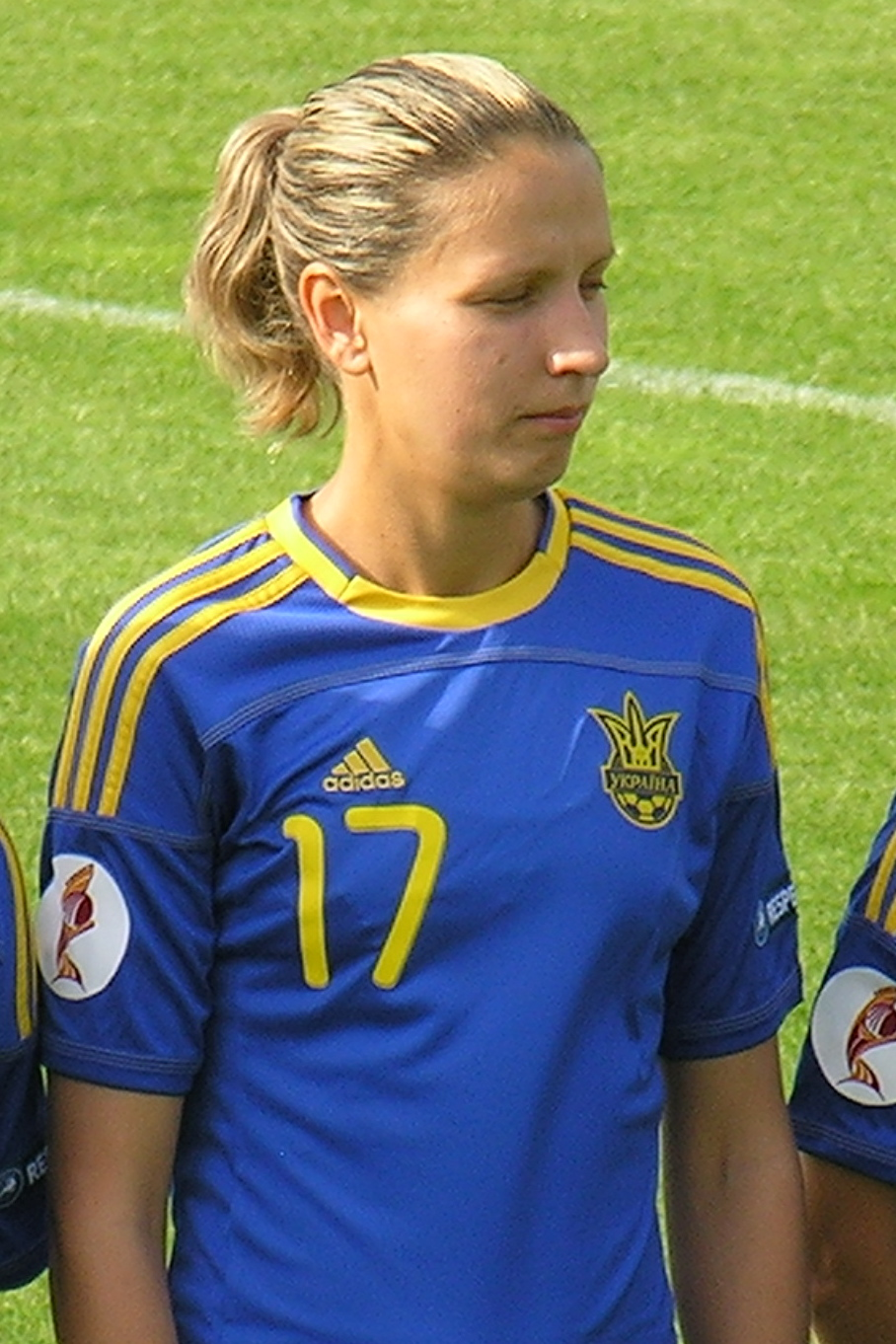
Daryna Apanashchenko

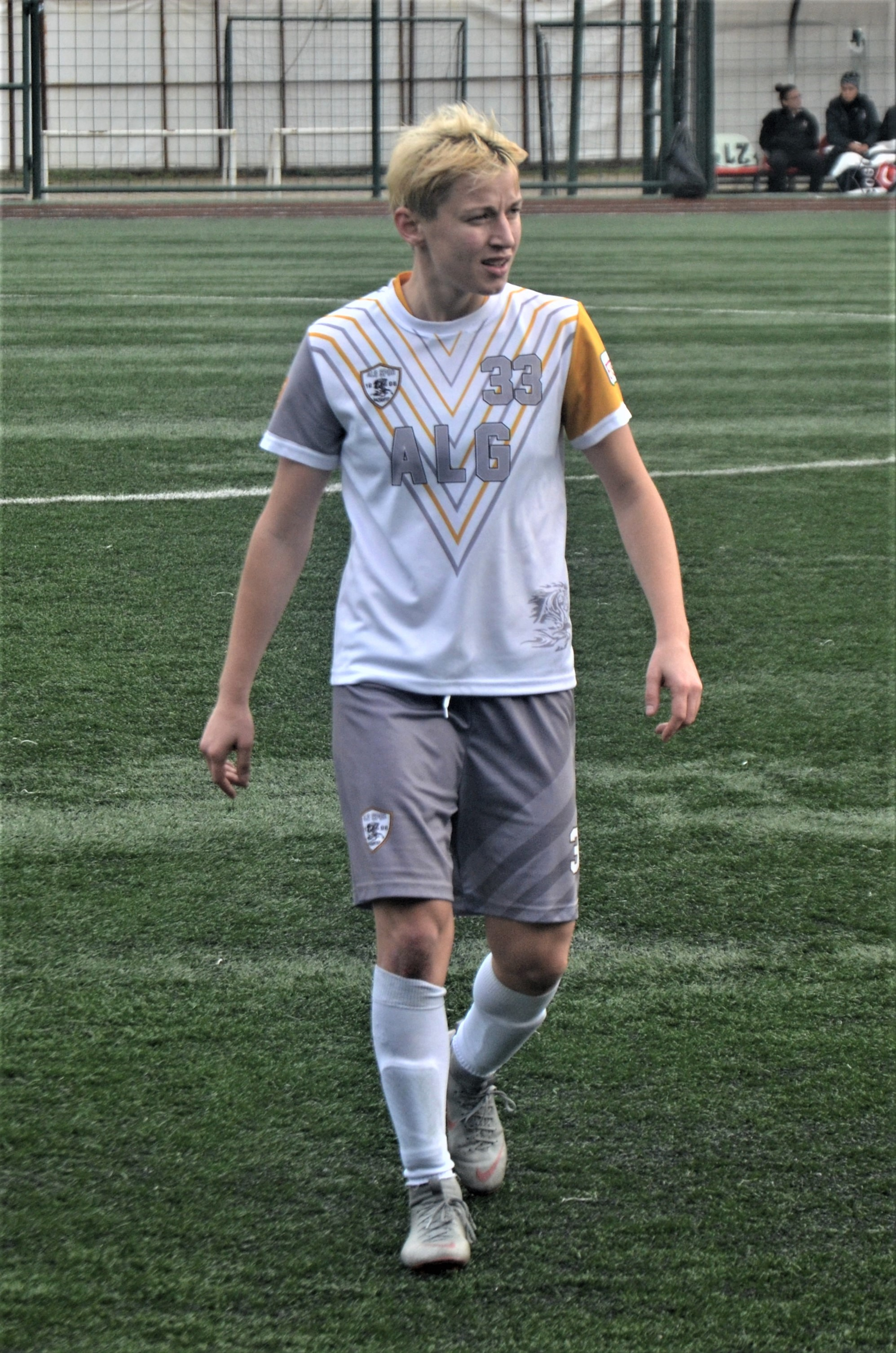
Natia Pantsulaia

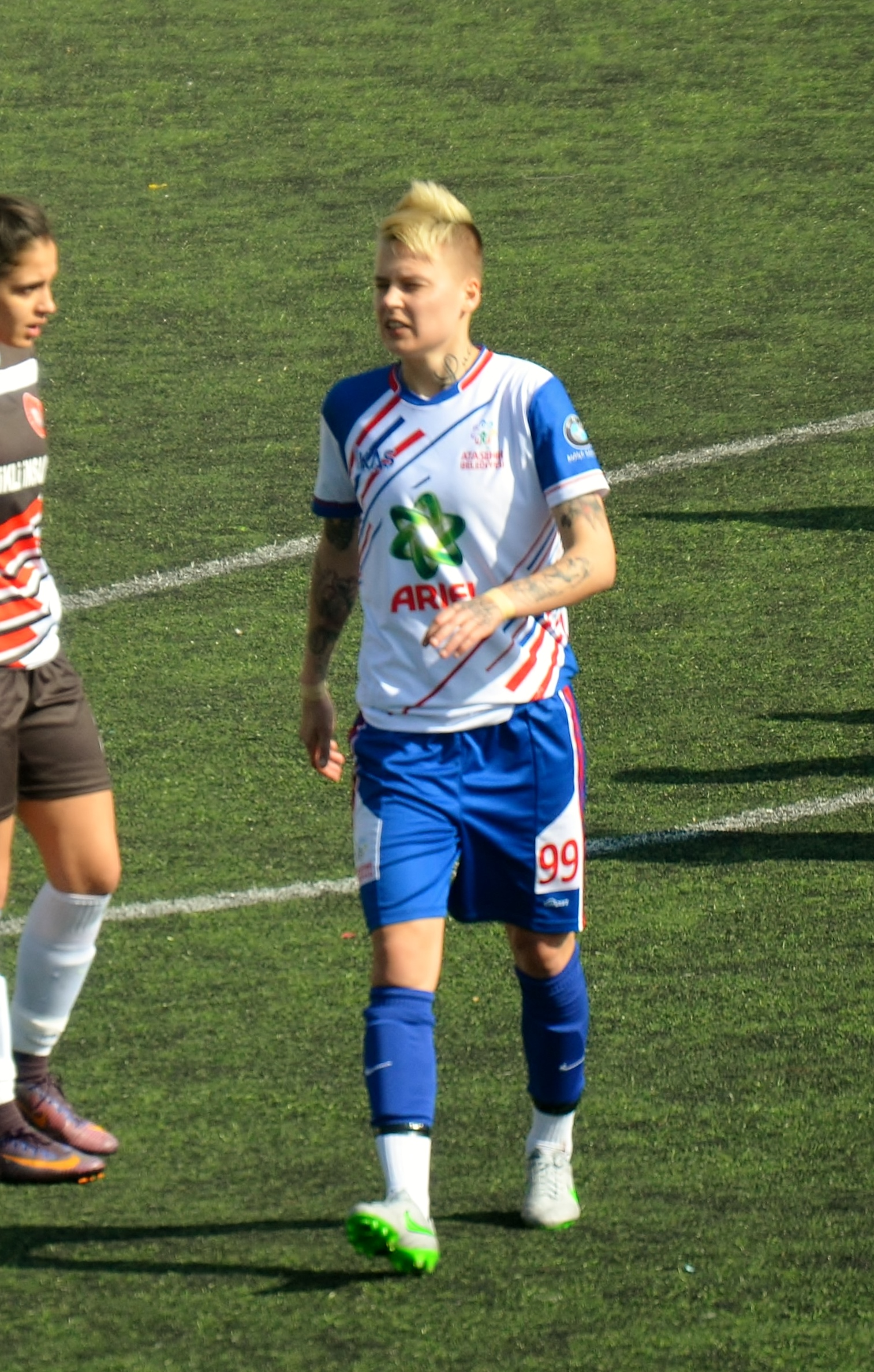
Tetyana Kozyrenko

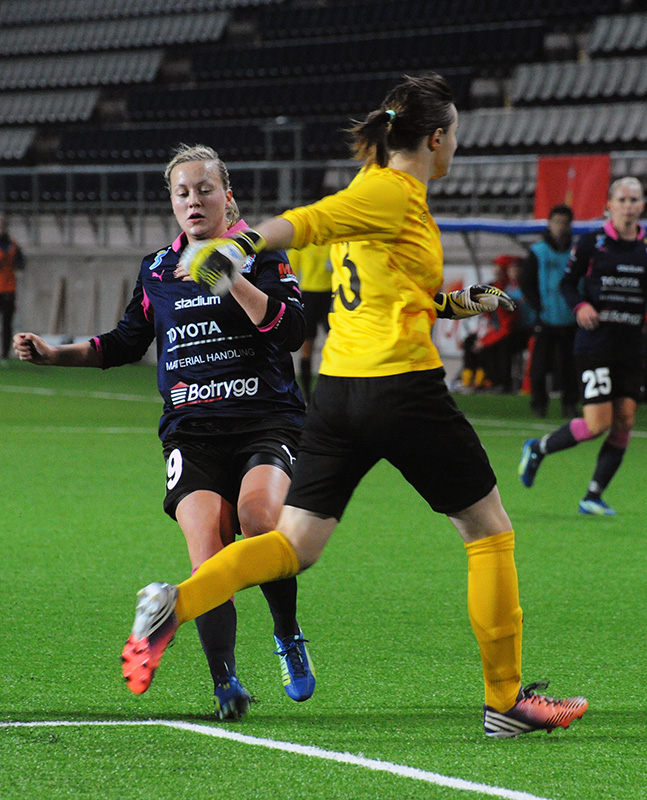
Kateryna Samson

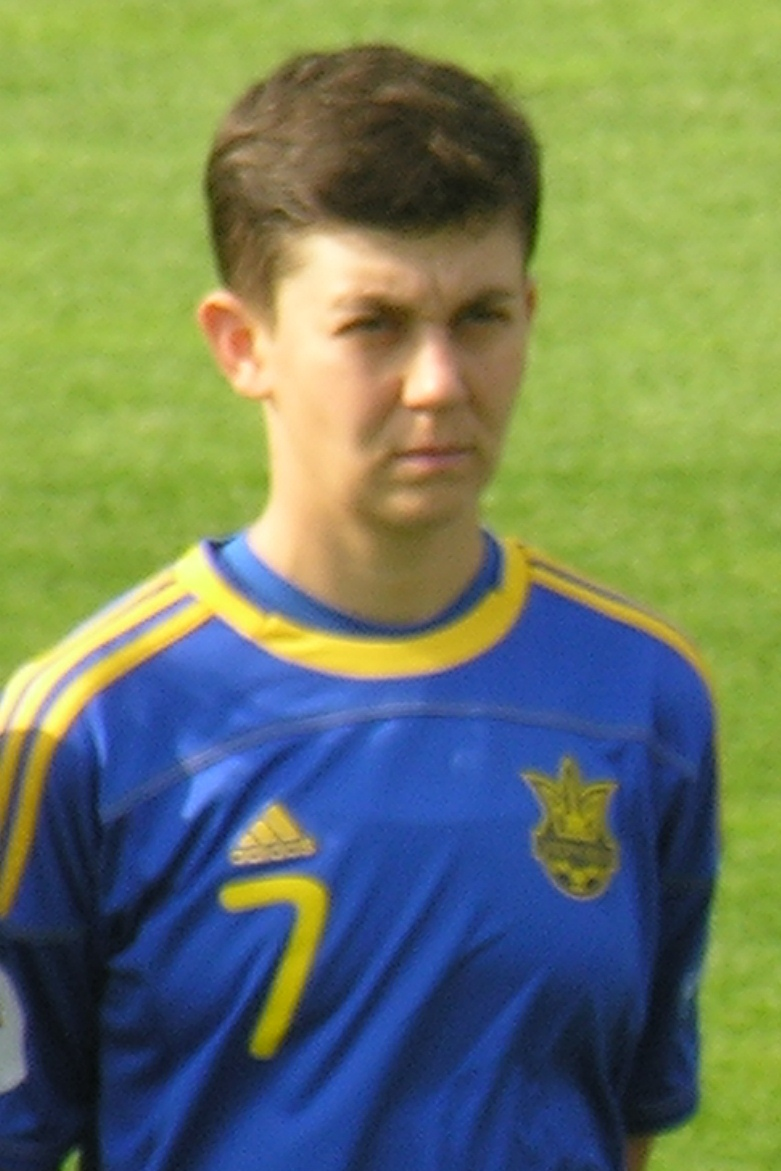
Olena Khodyreva

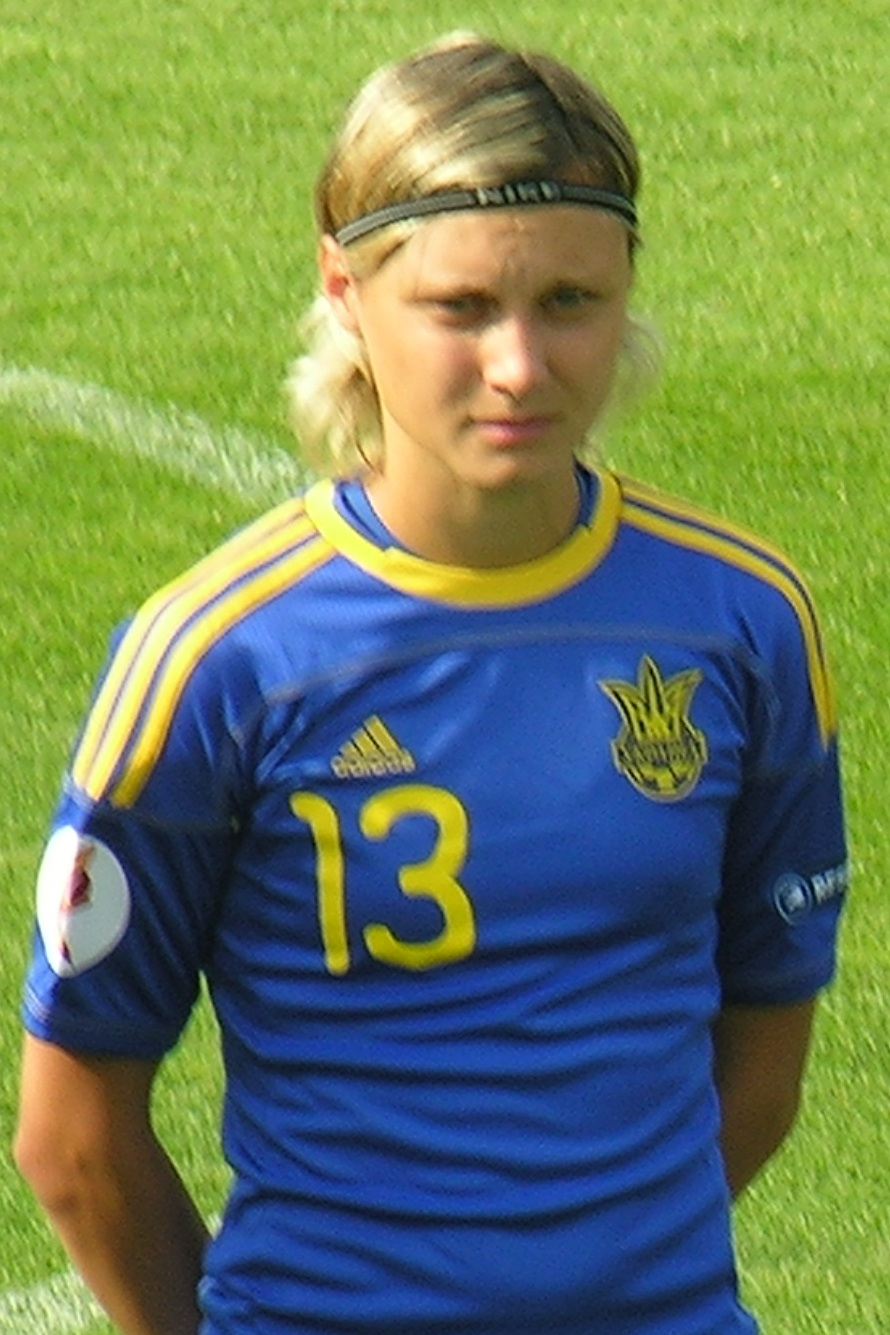
Yulia Kornievets

=== Former players ===
- (Ukraine) Daryna Apanaschenko
- (Ukraine) Vera Dyatel
- (Ukraine) Alla Lyshafay
- (Ukraine) Lyudmyla Pekur
- (Russia) Svetlana Petko
- (Ukraine) Iryna Zvarych
- (Ukraine) Oksana Yakovyshyn
- (Ukraine) Tetyana Fedosova
- (Ukraine) Tetyana Chorna
- (Ukraine) Nadiya Baranova
- (Ukraine) Anastasia Ilyina
- (Ukraine) Masha Vintonyak
- (Ukraine) Lyudmyla Lemeshko
- (Ukraine) Yulia Vashchenko
- (Ukraine) Darya Kravets
- (Ukraine) Natalya Zinchenko

== Managers ==
Manager	started	ended
(Soviet Union) (Ukraine) Mykhailo Yushchenko	1987	1996
(Ukraine) Mykola Lytvyn	1996	1997
(Ukraine) Mykhailo Yushchenko	1998	1998
(Ukraine) Anatoliy Piskovets	1998	1999
(Ukraine) Serhiy Umen	1999	2002
(Ukraine) Mykola Lytvyn	2002	2005
(Ukraine) Serhiy Umen	2004	2006
(Ukraine) Anatoliy Piskovets	2006	2007
(Ukraine) Volodymyr Zhylin	2007	2007
(Ukraine) Valery Tretyakov	2007	2007
(Ukraine) Serhiy Sapronov	2008	2012
(Ukraine) Yuriy Hruznov	2012	2012
(Ukraine) Volodymyr Kulyk	2012	2013
(Ukraine) Serhiy Sapronov	2014	2014
(Ukraine) Yuriy Hruznov	2014	2014
(Ukraine) Volodymyr Kulyk	2015	2018

== Honours ==
Ukrainian Women's League

- Winners (6): 2000, 2001, 2002, 2005, 2009, 2010
- Runners-up (10): 1997, 1998, 1999, 2003, 2004, 2006, 2008, 2011, 2013, 2015
- Third place (6):: 1992, 2007, 2014, 2016, 2017–18

Women's Cup

- Winners (4): 2001, 2002, 2005, 2009
- Runners-up (14): 1998, 1999, 2003, 2004, 2006, 2007, 2008, 2010, 2011, 2013, 2014, 2015, 2016, 2017–18

Winter Championship

- Winners (1): 2013
- Runners-up (2): 2008, 2018

Italy Women's Cup:

- Winners (1): 2006
- Third place (1):: 2005

== European history ==
Lehenda became the first women's club from Ukraine to enter the European competitions in 2001. They made their debut during the 2001–02 UEFA Women's Cup when they met the French side Toulouse FC at Dam Park in Ayr, Scotland. They lost the match 0:1 when Lyudmyla Lemeshko scored an own goal in the second half. Overall, they competed in 5 seasons of the UEFA Women's Champions League (formerly the UEFA Women's Cup), reaching the post-league stage in the 2010-11 season when they were defeated by the Russian side Rossiyanka.

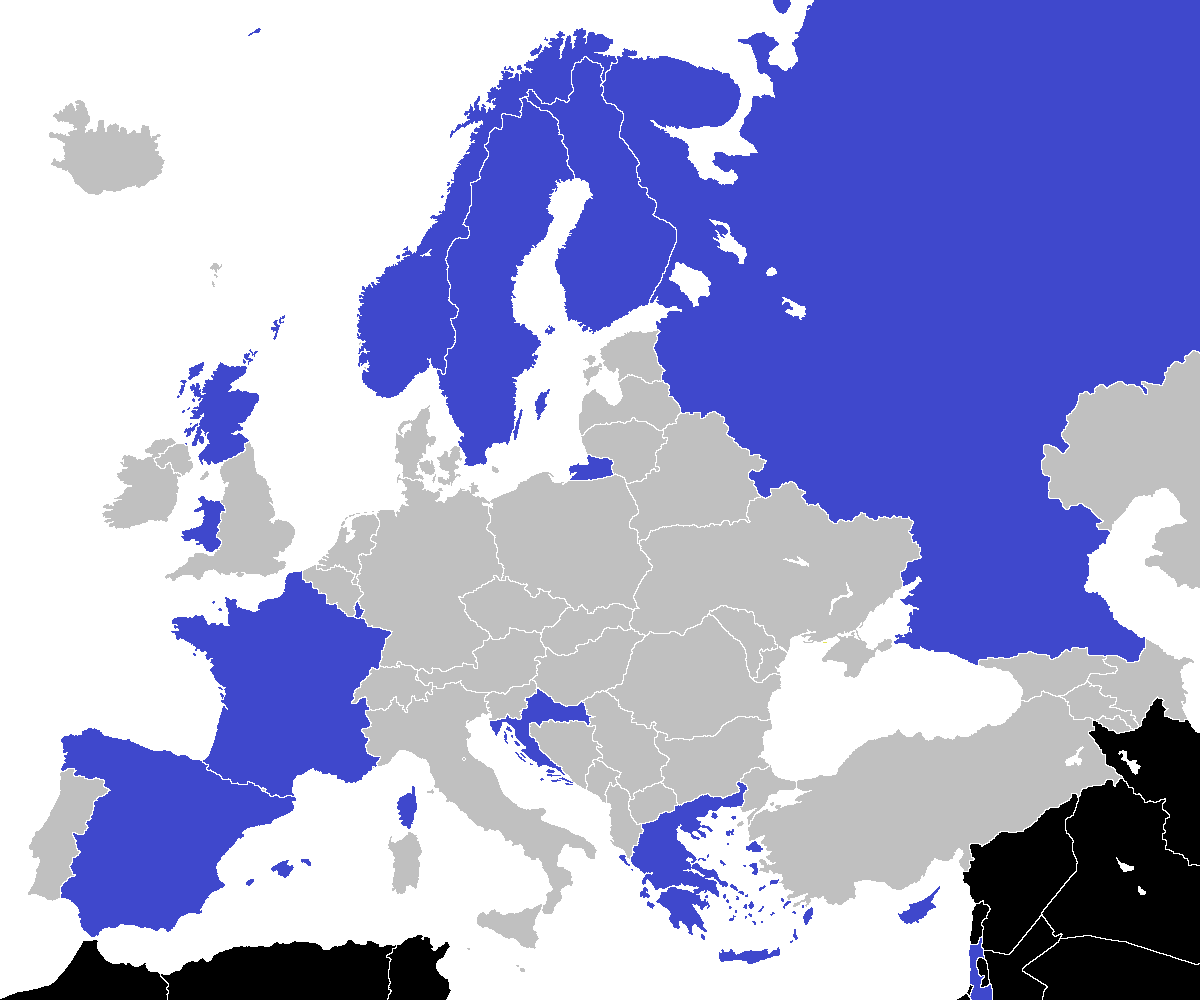
FC Lehenda Chernihiv opponents highlighted in blue as shown on the map

Season	Competition	Stage	Result	Opponent
2001-02	UEFA Women's Cup	Group Stage	0-1	(France) Toulouse FC
			1-1	(Scotland) Ayr United
			3-2	(Croatia) ZNK Osijek
2003-04	UEFA Women's Cup	Group Stage	4-0	(Israel) Maccabi Holon
			2-0	(Finland) United Jakobstad
			0-3	(Sweden) Malmö FF
2006-07	UEFA Women's Cup	Qualifying Stage	4-0	(Cyprus) AEK Kokkinochovion
			5-0	(Greece) PAOK Thessaloniki
			3-0	(Israel) Maccabi Holon
		Group Stage	0-2	(Sweden) Umeå IK
			1-2	(Norway) Kolbotn Fotball
			0-5	(Spain) RCD Espanyol
2010-11	Champions League	Round of 32	1-3 0-4	(Russia) Rossiyanka
2011-12	Champions League	Qualifying Stage	2-0	(Wales) Swansea City
			8-0	(Luxembourg) Progrès Niedercorn
			1-2	(Cyprus) Apollon Limassol

== Performance statistics ==
=== Soviet Union (1990–1991) ===
Performance in Soviet championship:

Tier І

== See also ==
- List of Chernihiv Sport Teams
- FC Desna Chernihiv
- FC Desna-2 Chernihiv
- FC Desna-3 Chernihiv
- SDYuShOR Desna
- FC Chernihiv
- Yunist Chernihiv
- FC Yednist' Plysky
- Spartak Chernihiv
