= Hennadiy Horshkov =

Soviet footballer and Ukrainian coach

Personal information
- Full name: Горшков, Геннадий Петрович
- Date of birth: 8 January 1953 (age 73)
- Place of birth: Zhovti Vody, Ukrainian SSR, USSR
- Position: Striker

Senior career*
Years	Team	Apps	(Gls)
1970–1975	FC Kolos Nikopol	0	(0)
1976–1977	FC Metalurh Zaporizhya	48	(2)
1977–1979	Desna Chernihiv	94	(17)
1980	FC Spartak Ivano-Frankivsk	22	(11)
1980–1987	Desna Chernihiv	291	(95)
1988	FC Zirka Kropyvnytskyi	2	(11)
1988–1989	FC Turtkulchi Turtkul	73	(12)
1989–1994	FC Cheksyl Chernihiv	40	(10)
1994–1995	FC Sirius Zhovti Vody	7	(0)

Managerial career
- 1987: Desna Chernihiv (assistant)
- * Club domestic league appearances and goals

Hennadiy Horshkov (Russian: Геннадий Петрович Горшков) (born January 8, January 1953) is a retired Soviet football player and Ukrainian coach. The best scorer of Desna Chernihiv in the championships of the USSR.

== Career ==
A pupil of Zheltovodsk football. The first coach is Alexander Lunin. In 1970 he became a player of the youth team "Vanguard". From 1973 he played for the main team, which played at the amateur level. From 1976 to 1988 he played for the teams of the second league FC Kolos Nikopol and from 1976 to 1977 he played for FC Metalurh Zaporizhya. From 1977 until 1979, he played Desna Chernihiv. Its considered the most productive player of the Chernihiv club in the championships of the USSR is 112 goals scored in 385 matches. Takes 14th place in the club of Eugene Derevyagi – the list of the most productive players of the championship of the Ukrainian SSR (in the second league). Part of the 1980 season played for the first league team – FC Spartak Ivano-Frankivsk.

In 1988 he moved to FC Zirka Kropyvnytskyi and to Tselinnik Turtkul a team in Uzbekistan. In 1989, he played for FC Cheksyl Chernihiv, another team in Chernihiv.

In 1994 he moved to FC Sirius Zhovti Vody the team in his city Zhovti Vody to close his career.

Vasily Hnatiuk in the book "Zheltovodsky football" described the football player as follows: "Without any special grenadier data, Gennady Gorshkov never played the role of center forward. He liked to attack the opponent's goal more from the depths of the field. In addition, in the interests of the team he often played in the middle of the field, playing the role of "passer" -dispatcher, which had his good technical arsenal and excellent football vision. He scored most of the goals from medium distances with a good tight shot (although he could "twist" from the standard) or sent the ball into the net, being in the right place at the right time... »

== Honours ==
Desna Chernihiv

- Championship of the Ukrainian SSR: Runner-up 1982

FC Cheksyl Chernihiv

- Chernihiv Oblast Football Championship 1983, 1992
- Chernihiv Oblast Football Cup 1984

Individual

- The best scorer of "Desna" in the championships of the USSR – 112 goals.
- The best scorer of "Desna" for the season – 1979, 1980, 1981, 1982, 1983, 1984, 1985.
