= Valentyn Buhlak =

Soviet footballer and Ukrainian coach

Personal information
- Full name: Valentyn Vladyslavovych Buhlak
- Date of birth: 1 January 1963
- Place of birth: Chernihiv, Ukrainian SSR, USSR
- Date of death: 18 July 1996 (aged 33)
- Place of death: Chernihiv, Ukraine
- Height: 1.70 m (5 ft 7 in)
- Position: Forward

Senior career*
Years	Team	Apps	(Gls)
1981–1983	Desna Chernihiv	48	(10)
1984	Metalurh Zaporizhzhia	24	(0)
1985	Desna Chernihiv	4	(1)
1987–1988	CSKA Moscow	3	(0)
1988–1992	Desna Chernihiv	158	(3)
1993–1995	Tekstylschyk Chernihiv	18	(1)
- * Club domestic league appearances and goals

Valentyn Vladyslavovych Buhlak (Ukrainian: Валентин Владиславович Буглак; 1 January 1963 – 18 July 1996) was a Soviet football player and Ukrainian coach. He spent most of his career to Desna Chernihiv the main club in Chernihiv.

== Career ==
In 1981 Buhlak started his career Desna Chernihiv until 1983. In 1984 he moved to Metalurh Zaporizhya, where he played 24 matches. In 1984 he moved to Desna Chernihiv for a few games and then he moved to CSKA Moscowl for one season and in 1988 he returned to Desna Chernihiv, where he played 158 games. In 1992 he moved to Tekstylschyk Chernihiv, where he played 18 matches and scored 1 goal.

== Honours ==
FC Cheksyl Chernihiv

- Chernihiv Oblast Football Cup 1984

Desna Chernihiv

- Championship of the Ukrainian SSR: Runner-up 1982
