= Viktor Danilevsky =

Ukrainian footballer (1951–2026)

Viktor Danilevskiy
Personal information
- Full name: Viktor Nikolayevich Danilevskiy
- Date of birth: 18 July 1951
- Place of birth: Chernihiv, Ukrainian SSR, Soviet Union (now Ukraine)
- Date of death: 14 February 2026 (aged 74)
- Position: Defender

Senior career*
| Years | Team | Apps | (Gls) |
| 1971–1973 | Khimik Chernihiv | 30 | (0) |
| 1974–1976 | Frunzenets | 20 | (1) |
| 1976–1978 | FC Dnipro | 26 | (0) |
| 1978–1984 | Desna Chernihiv | 224 | (6) |
- * Club domestic league appearances and goals

Viktor Nikolayevich Danilevskiy (Russian: Виктор Николаевич Данилевский; Ukrainian: Віктор Миколайович Данилевський, romanized: Viktor Mykolaiovych Danylevskyi; 18 July 1951 – 14 February 2026) was a Soviet footballer who played as a Defender.

== Playing career ==
Nikolayevich born in Chernihiv, where in 1972, he started to play for Khimik Chernihiv. With Khimik Chernihiv, he won the Chernihiv Oblast Football Championship in 1971, 1972 and 1973.

From 1974 until 1976, he played for Frunzenets where he earned 20 caps, scoring 1 goal. He also played 2 seasons with FC Dnipro.

In 1978, he moved to Desna Chernihiv, where he earned 224 caps scoring 6 goals. On 14 February 2026, he die at 75 years of age.

== Honours ==
Khimik Chernihiv

- Chernihiv Oblast Football Championship (3) 1971, 1972, 1973

Desna Chernihiv

- Championship of the Ukrainian SSRː Runners-up (1): 1982
