= Serhiy Sapronov =

Soviet footballer and Ukrainian coach

Personal information
- Full name: Сапронов Сергей Валентинович
- Date of birth: 21 October 1961 (age 65)
- Place of birth: Chernihiv, Ukrainian SSR, USSR
- Position: Defender

Youth career
- SDYuShOR Desna
- Desna-3 Chernihiv

Senior career*
Years	Team	Apps	(Gls)
1979–1984	Desna Chernihiv	180	(1)
1985	SKA Kyiv	28	(0)
1986	Nyva Vinnytsia	29	(0)
1987–1992	Desna Chernihiv	206	(6)
1992	Veres Rivne	6	(0)
1992–1995	Nyva Vinnytsia	76	(0)
1995	Zirka Kropyvnytskyi	2	(0)
1995–1996	Bukovyna Chernivtsi	26	(0)
1996–2000	Desna Chernihiv	80	(0)
Total		633	(7)

Managerial career
- 2001: Desna Chernihiv
- 2002-2005: FC Nizhyn
- 2008-2012: Lehenda Chernihiv
- 2012: SDUSHOR Spartak
- 2013-2015: Ukraine (women under 15)
- 2014: Lehenda-Chernihiv
- 2015: Ukraine (women under 17)
- 2019: Zhytlobud-1 Kharkiv
- * Club domestic league appearances and goals

Serhiy Sapronov (Ukrainian: Сапронов Сергей Валентинович; born 21 October 1961) is a retired Soviet football player and Ukrainian coach. He spent most of his career to Desna Chernihiv the main club in Chernihiv.

== Career ==
Serhiy Sapronov, started his career Desna Chernihiv, from the season 1979 until 1984, where he played 85 games and scored 31 goals. He made his debut for his new team on May 3, 1999 in a home match of the national championship between Chernihiv's Desna and Zaporizhia's Torpedo. In that match, the hosts lost 0: 3. Oleksandr came on in the 46th minute of the match instead of Petro Pylypeiko, but in the 65th minute he was replaced by Vadym.

== As coach ==
After completing his performances, he worked for some time as an assistant to the head coach of Desna, and from 2002 to 2005 he headed the amateur football club Nizhyn. During 2005-2007 he worked as a trainer-teacher of the Sports School of the FSO "Spartak". In 2008, he was appointed head coach of the Lehenda-Chernihiv women's football club. He won gold medals of the Ukrainian Championship twice in a row with the club (2009, 2010) and twice brought silver to Chernihiv. In 2009, the Legends footballers made a golden double, adding the Ukrainian Cup to the championship. Due to the unsuccessful start of the team in the 2012 championship, Sergei Sapronov was dismissed from the post of the head coach of Legends of his own free will.

In 2013, he was appointed as Ukraine (women under 15).

In 2019 he has been appointed as coach of Zhytlobud-1 Kharkiv.

== Honour ==
=== As Player ===
Desna Chernihiv

- Ukrainian Second League: 1996-97
- Championship of the Ukrainian SSR: Runner-up 1982

Zirka Kropyvnytskyi

- Ukrainian First League: 1994-95

Nyva Vinnytsia

- Ukrainian First League: 1992-93

=== As Coach ===
Lehenda Chernihiv

- Ukrainian Women's League: 2009, 2010
- Women's Cup: 2009
