= 1981 Soviet Second League, Zone 5 =

Football Championship of Ukrainian SSR
- Season: 1981
- Champions: Kryvbas Kryvyi Rih
- Promoted: none (after playoffs)
- Relegated: none (some teams withdrawn)
- Top goalscorer: 22 - Serhiy Shevchenko (Nyva)

1981 Football Championship of Ukrainian SSR was the 51st season of association football competition of the Ukrainian SSR, which was part of the Soviet Second League in Zone 5. The season started on 4 April 1981.

The 1981 Football Championship of Ukrainian SSR was won by Kryvbas Kryvyi Rih. Qualified for the interzonal playoffs, the team from Dnipropetrovsk Oblast did not manage to gain promotion by placing second in its group.

The "Ruby Cup" of Molod Ukrayiny newspaper (for the most scored goals) was received by Kryvbas Kryvyi Rih.

== Teams ==
=== Location map ===
Locations of teams in Second League, Zone 5

=== Promoted teams ===
- Kolos Mezhyrich – Champion of the Fitness clubs competitions (KFK) (debut)

=== Renamed teams ===
- Vuhlyk Horlivka was called Shakhtar Horlivka
- Shakhtar Stakhanov was called Stakhanovets Stakhanov

== Final standings ==
Pos	Team	Pld	W	D	L	GF	GA	GD	Pts	Qualification or relegation
1	Kryvbas Kryvyi Rih (C, Q)	44	25	15	4	68	33	+35	65	Qualified for interzonal competitions among other Zone winners
2	Nyva Vinnytsia	44	23	11	10	60	34	+26	57	
3	Avanhard Rivne	44	21	14	9	62	23	+39	56	
4	Bukovyna Chernivtsi	44	23	9	12	58	28	+30	55	
5	Sudnobudivnyk Mykolaiv	44	19	13	12	50	39	+11	51	
6	Atlantyka Sevastopol	44	18	15	11	64	40	+24	51	
7	Vuhlyk Horlivka	44	16	19	9	53	44	+9	51	
8	Torpedo Lutsk	44	20	8	16	56	35	+21	48	
9	SKA Lviv	44	16	15	13	49	47	+2	47	Merged with Karpaty Lviv
10	Kolos Mezhyrich	44	19	8	17	50	49	+1	46	
11	Spartak Zhytomyr	44	15	13	16	38	47	−9	43	
12	Desna Chernihiv	44	13	15	16	48	38	+10	41	
13	Okean Kerch	44	13	14	17	45	51	−6	40	
14	Podillia Khmelnytskyi	44	15	9	20	45	64	−19	39	
15	Krystal Kherson	44	15	9	20	62	73	−11	39	
16	Novator Zhdanov	44	14	11	19	41	63	−22	39	
17	Zirka Kirovohrad	44	10	19	15	36	36	0	39	
18	Zakarpattia Uzhhorod	44	13	12	19	41	44	−3	38	
19	Kolos Poltava	44	11	16	17	33	61	−28	38	
20	Dnipro Cherkasy	44	13	11	20	44	55	−11	37	
21	Frunzenets Sumy	44	9	19	16	36	56	−20	37	
22	Metalurh Dniprodzerzhynsk	44	8	13	23	31	71	−40	29	
23	Shakhtar Stakhanov	44	10	6	28	34	73	−39	26	Avoided relegation

(C) Champions; (Q) Qualified for the phase indicated

== Top goalscorers ==
The following were the top ten goalscorers.

#	Scorer	Goals (Pen.)	Team
1	Serhiy Shevchenko	22	Nyva Vinnytsia
2	Vitaliy Dmytrenko	21	Kryvbas Kryvyi Rih
3	Fedir Vasylchenko	20	Vuhlyk Horlivka
4	Oleksandr Novikov	19	Kolos Mezhyrich
5	Pavlo Petrov	17	Atlantyka Sevastopol
6	Volodymyr Chyrkov	16	Avanhard Rivno
6	Vilhelm Tellinher	16	Podillia Khmelnytskyi

== See also ==
- Soviet Second League
