= Serhiy Umen =

Soviet footballer and Ukrainian coach

Personal information
- Full name: Сергій Григорович Умен
- Date of birth: 29 March 1962 (age 64)
- Place of birth: Pryluky, Ukrainian SSR, USSR
- Position: Goalkeeper

Senior career*
Years	Team	Apps	(Gls)
1979-1984	Desna Chernihiv	63	(0)
1985-1986	Zirka Chernihiv	0	(0)
1987	Desna Chernihiv	20	(0)
1988	Zirka Chernihiv	0	(0)
1989	FC Alay	1	(0)
1990-1992	Zirka Chernihiv	0	(0)

Managerial career
- 1997-1999: Lehenda Chernihiv (Goalkeeper coach)
- 1999-2002: Lehenda Chernihiv
- 2003-2005: Lehenda Chernihiv (Goalkeeper coach)
- 2005-2007: Lehenda Chernihiv
- 2006: Ukraine (women)
- 2007-2012: Rossiyanka (Goalkeeper coach)
- * Club domestic league appearances and goals

Serhiy Umen (Ukrainian: Сергій Григорович Умен, romanized: Serhiy Hryhorovych Umen; Russian: Сергей Григорьевич Умен, romanized: Sergey Grigorovich Umen) (born in Pryluky, March 39, 1962) is a retired Soviet football player and Ukrainian coach. He spend most of his career to Desna Chernihiv the main club in Chernihiv. In 1989 he moved for FC Alay and in 1990 until 1992, he moved to Zirka Chernihiv.

== Playing career ==
In 1979, Serhiy Umen, started his career in Desna Chernihiv, the main club in Chernihiv. In 1982 with the club got second in the Championship of the Ukrainian SSR, Zone 6. From 1985 to 1986, he moved to Zirka Chernihiv, then in 1986 he moved to Desna Chernihiv again for one season.

== Coaching career ==
In 1997, he was appointed as coach of the female football Lehenda Chernihiv. In 2006 he was appointed as the Woman Ukrainian National Team. From 2007 until 2012 he was appointed as coach of Rossiyanka in the city of Khimki in Moscow Oblast, Russia. With the club he won the Russian Leagues in the season 2010, and in 2011–12. He won also the Russian Cups in 2008, 2009 and in 2010.

== Honours ==
As player

FC Desna Chernihiv

- Championship of the Ukrainian SSR: Runner-up 1982

As coach

Lehenda Chernihiv

- Ukrainian Women's League: 2000, 2001, 2002
- Women's Cup: 2001, 2002
