= Krystal Stadium =

Sporting venue in Ukraine

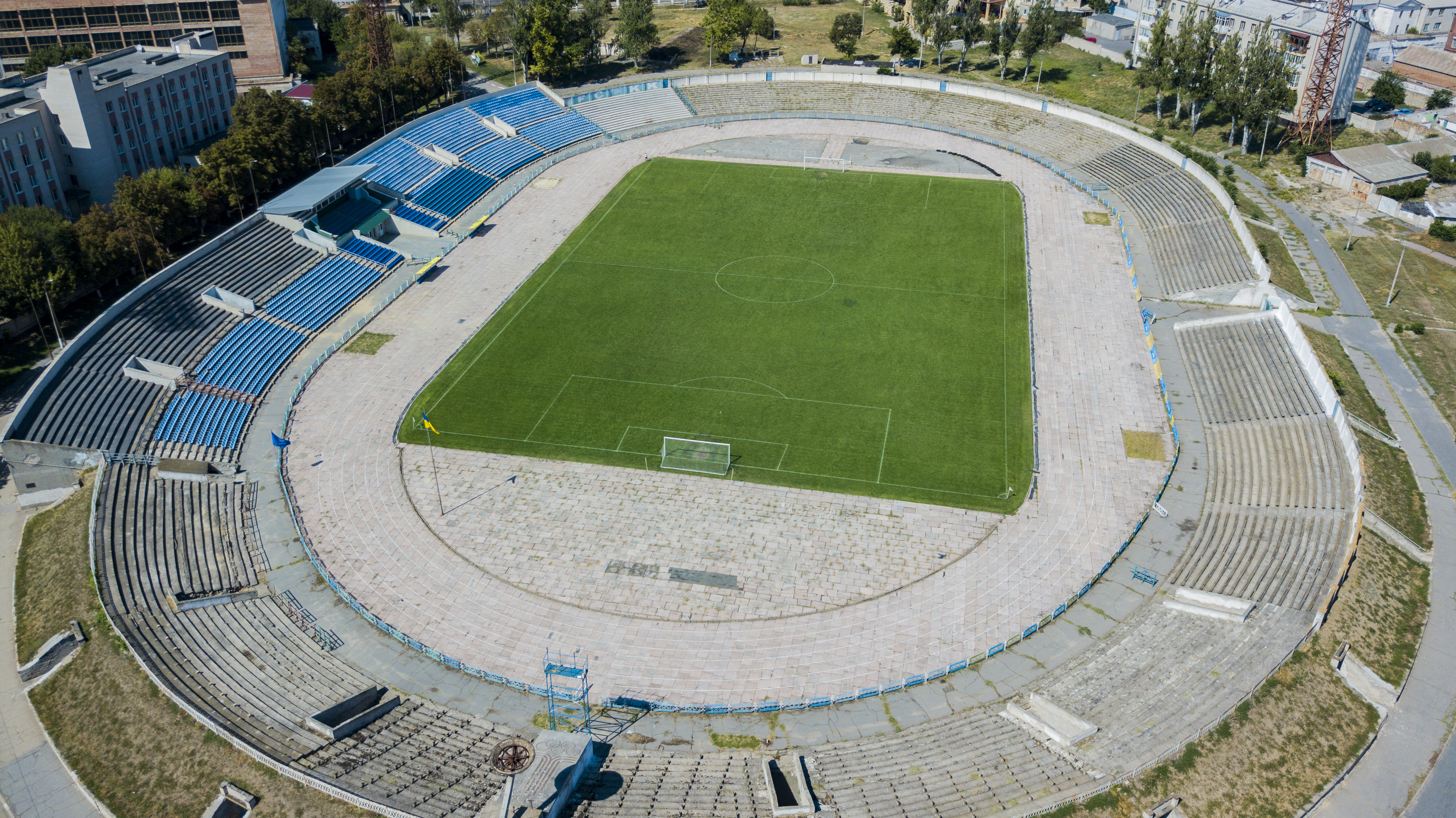
- in 2017
- Interactive map of Krystal Stadium
- Location: Kherson, Ukraine
- Coordinates: 46.636389°N 32.625278°E
- Capacity: 15,000
- Surface: Grass

Tenant
- FC Krystal Kherson

Krystal Stadium is a multi-use stadium in Kherson, Ukraine. It is currently used mostly for football matches and is the home of FC Krystal Kherson. The stadium has 3,400 seats and holds 15,000 spectators.

It is located in the city's center not far from the Dnieper river and is surrounded by several parks, such as the Kherson Fortress Park, the Glory Park, and the City Park.

The stadium is in somewhat poor condition and had ongoing renovations since 2017. Built in 1962, it has never been properly renovated.
