= Viktor Dohadailo =

Ukrainian football referee (born 1960)

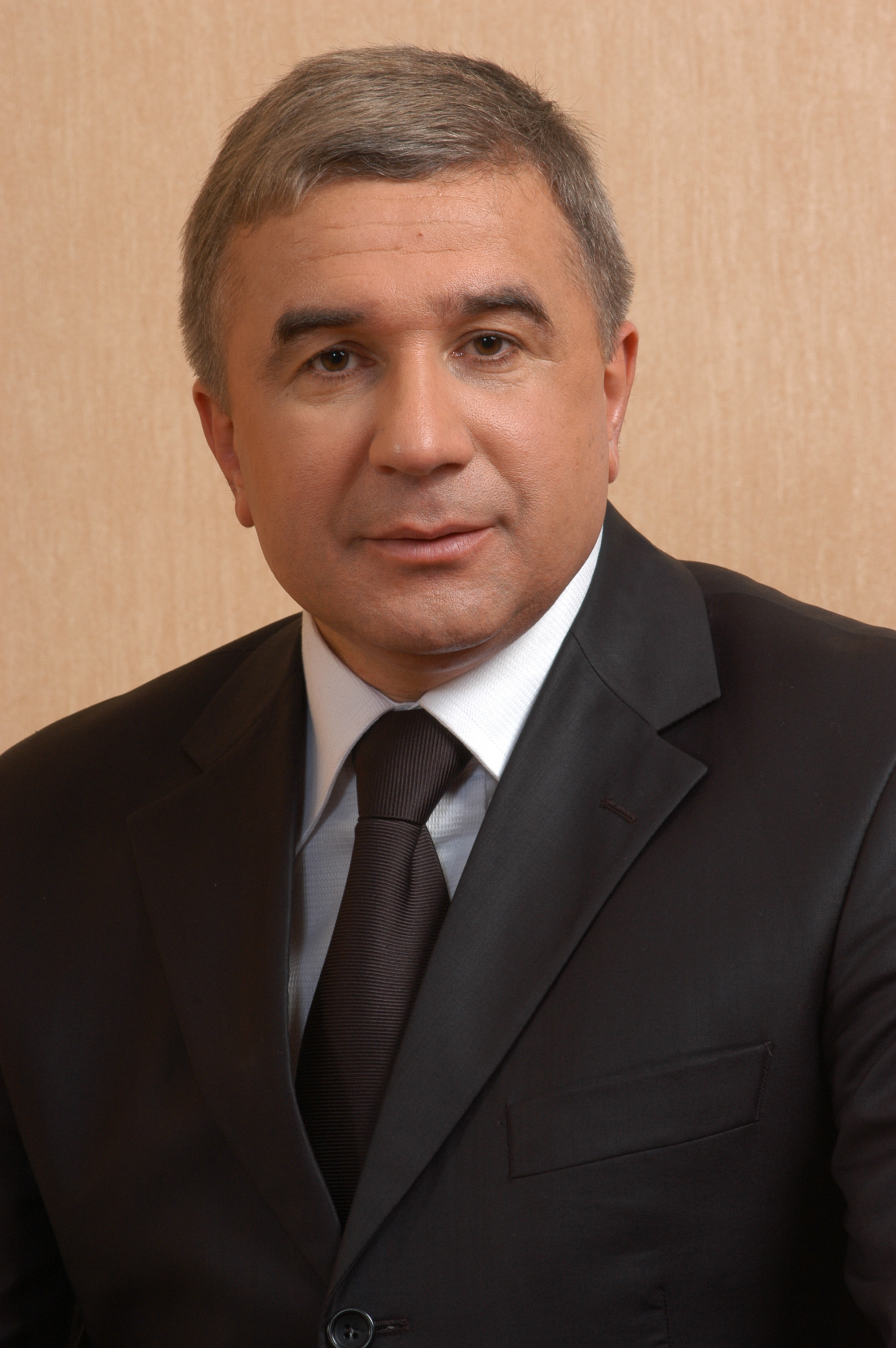
- Dohadailo in 2004

Personal information
- Full name: Viktor Havrylovych Dohadailo
- Date of birth: 17 April 1960 (age 66)
- Place of birth: Kyiv, Ukrainian SSR
- Position: Midfielder

Senior career*
Years	Team	Apps	(Gls)
1978	SKA Kyiv	13	(0)
1980	FC Ocean Kerch	25	(0)
1981	FC Desna Chernihiv	1	(0)
1982	FC Ocean Kerch	1	(0)

Managerial career
- 1994–1999: Ukraine U-21 (assistant)
- 1997–2001: Ukraine U-19 (assistant)
- 2001–2005: FC Shakhtar Donetsk (staff)
- 2005–2007: FC Chornomorets Odesa (assistant)
- 2007: FC Chornomorets Odesa (caretaker)
- 2008: FC Knyazha Shchaslyve (sports director)
- 2008: FC Knyazha Shchaslyve
- 2009: FC Kazakhmys
- 2010: FC Desna Chernihiv
- 2010–2011: FC Zirka Kirovohrad (assistant)
- 2011–2012: FC Okzhetpes
- 2012: FC Metalurh Zaporizhia (assistant)
- 2015–2016: FC Zaria Bălți (assistant)
- 2015–2016: FC Zaria Bălți (caretaker)
- 2016: FC Zugdidi (assistant)
- 2016–2017: FC Zirka Kropyvnytskyi (sports director)
- 2016: FC Zirka Kropyvnytskyi (caretaker)
- 2016: FC Zirka Kropyvnytskyi (U21 team)
- * Club domestic league appearances and goals

Viktor Havrylovych Dohadailo (Ukrainian: Віктор Гаврилович Догадайло; born 17 April 1960) is a Soviet retired footballer and Ukrainian football referee who currently serves as Ukrainian manager.
