= Mykola Lytvyn (footballer) =

Ukrainian footballer and coach

Personal information
- Full name: Mykola Viktorovych Lytvyn
- Date of birth: 27 November 1963 (age 62)
- Place of birth: Chystohalivka, Chornobyl Raion, Soviet Union
- Height: 1.81 m (5 ft 11 1/2 in)
- Position: Defender

Senior career*
Years	Team	Apps	(Gls)
1981	Desna Chernihiv	6	(1)
1982–1983	Tavriya Simferopol	24	(0)
1984–1985	Spartak Zhytomyr	54	(2)
1986–1989	Desna Chernihiv	169	(26)
1990–1991	Bukovina Chernivtsi	73	(9)
1992	Nyva Vinnytsia	9	(1)
1992–1993	Khimik Zhytomyr	29	(2)
1993	Korosten	8	(0)
1994	Vedrich Rechitsa	15	(1)
1995–1996	Ros Bila Tserkva	38	(6)

Managerial career
- 1996–1999: Lehenda Chernihiv
- 2002–2003: Ukraine (women)
- 2002–2005: Lehenda Chernihiv
- 2010: Desna Chernihiv (assistant)
- 2013: Arsenal Volodarka
- 2014–2016: Arsenal Bila Tserkva
- 2016–2018: Arsenal Bila Tserkva (assistant)
- * Club domestic league appearances and goals

Mykola Viktorovych Lytvyn (Ukrainian: Микола Вікторович Литвин; born 25 September 1958) is a professional Ukrainian football coach and former player.

== Honours ==
=== As Player ===
Bukovina Chernovtsy

- Soviet Second League: 1990

Khimik Zhytomyr

- Ukrainian Second League: 1992–93

=== As Coach ===
Lehenda-ShVSM Chernihiv

- Ukrainian Women's League 2002, 2005,
- Women's Cup 2002, 2005
