= FC Kosmos Pavlohrad =

Former professional Ukrainian football club

Kosmos Pavlohrad
- Founded: 1973
- Dissolved: 1995
- Ground: Shakhtar Stadium
- League: defunct

FC Kosmos Pavlohrad was a Ukrainian professional football club based in Pavlohrad, Ukraine.

== Brief overview ==
Before 1985, the club carried the name Kolos and represented the collective farm (kolkhoz) imyeni XXII syezda KPSS (the 22nd Congress of CPSU – им. ХХІІ съезда КПСС) from Mezhyrich. In 1981 the club was relocated from village Mezhyrich to Pavlohrad.

From 1986 to 1995, it played under the name Shakhtar representing the mining shaft imeni Geroyev Kosmasa (Heroes of the Universe – им. Героев космоса) of the Pavlohradvuhillia mining production association.

In 1994, it merged with another amateur club, Kosmos Pavlohrad, under the name Shakhtar Pavlohrad. In 1995, it changed its name to Kosmos Pavlohrad.

== Notable players ==
- Ihor Yavorskyi
- Volodymyr Stryzhevskyi
- Oleksandr Novikov
- Viktor Hromov

== Head coaches ==
- 1976 – 1978 Volodymyr Bahdasarov
- 1977 Mykola Dubynin
- 1980 – 1986 Oleksandr Popynachenko
- 1987 German Kudziyev
- 1989 Oleksiy Hryshyn
- 1990 Yuriy Rashchupkin
- 1992 – 1993 Anatoliy Keskyula
- 1994 Heorhiy Melnyk

=== Nachalniki komandy ===
- 1978 Volodymyr Aksyonov
- 1982 – 1985 Pavlo Kostin
- 1986 Pavlo Kostin
- 1988 – 1991 Anatoliy Keskyula
