= 1982 Soviet Second League, Zone 6 =

Football Championship of Ukrainian SSR
- Season: 1982
- Champions: Bukovyna Chernivtsi
- Promoted: none (after playoffs)
- Relegated: Kolos Poltava
- Top goalscorer: 32 - Serhiy Shevchenko (Nyva)

1982 Football Championship of Ukrainian SSR was the 52nd season of association football competition of the Ukrainian SSR, which was part of the Soviet Second League in Zone 6. The season started on 4 April 1982. Administratively, the Ukrainian Zone was moved again this time from Zone 5 to Zone 6.

The 1982 Football Championship of Ukrainian SSR was won by Bukovyna Chernivtsi. Qualified for the interzonal playoffs, the team from Chernivtsi Oblast did not manage to gain promotion by placing last in its group.

The "Ruby Cup" of Molod Ukrayiny newspaper (for the most scored goals) was received by Bukovyna Chernivtsi.

== Teams ==
=== Location map ===
Locations of teams in Lower Second League, Zone 1

=== Promoted teams ===
- Mayak Kharkiv – Champion of the Fitness clubs competitions (KFK) (debut)

=== Relegated teams ===
- Prykarpattia Ivano-Frankivsk – (Returning after 2 seasons)

=== Withdrawn teams ===
- SKA Lviv was merged with Karpaty Lviv and replaced the latter as SKA Karpaty Lviv in the Soviet Pervaya Liga (1982).

=== Renamed teams ===
- Shakhtar Horlivka was called Vuhlyk Horlivka
- Zakarpattia Uzhhorod was called Hoverla Uzhhorod
- Stakhanovets Stakhanov was called Shakhtar Stakhanov
- Prykarpattia Ivano-Frankivsk was called Spartak Ivano-Frankivsk

== Final standings ==
Pos	Team	Pld	W	D	L	GF	GA	GD	Pts	Qualification or relegation
1	Bukovyna Chernivtsi (C, Q)	46	29	8	9	71	34	+37	66	Qualified for interzonal competitions among other Zone winners
2	Desna Chernihiv	46	26	10	10	64	37	+27	62	
3	Kolos Mezhyrich	46	26	10	10	60	39	+21	62	
4	Avanhard Rivne	46	25	11	10	65	34	+31	61	
5	Nyva Vinnytsia	46	23	13	10	69	36	+33	59	
6	Atlantyka Sevastopol	46	22	12	12	68	39	+29	56	
7	Spartak Zhytomyr	46	23	8	15	68	46	+22	54	
8	Dnipro Cherkasy	46	21	12	13	54	42	+12	54	
9	Shakhtar Horlivka	46	19	12	15	61	57	+4	50	
10	Kryvbas Kryvyi Rih	46	20	9	17	50	48	+2	49	
11	Sudnobudivnyk Mykolaiv	46	16	12	18	56	48	+8	44	
12	Metalurh Dniprodzerzhynsk	46	17	9	20	47	47	0	43	
13	Prykarpattia Ivano-Frankivsk	46	17	8	21	41	58	−17	42	
14	Torpedo Lutsk	46	16	9	21	49	60	−11	41	
15	Zirka Kirovohrad	46	17	5	24	43	63	−20	39	
16	Mayak Kharkiv	46	14	10	22	52	65	−13	38	
17	Zakarpattia Uzhhorod	46	14	8	24	37	53	−16	36	
18	Stakhonovets Stakhanov	46	13	10	23	40	54	−14	36	
19	Krystal Kherson	46	12	12	22	41	64	−23	36	
20	Podillia Khmelnytskyi	46	12	12	22	37	62	−25	36	
21	Frunzenets Sumy	46	12	12	22	38	62	−24	36	
22	Novator Zhdanov	46	13	9	24	44	60	−16	35	
23	Okean Kerch	46	12	11	23	43	67	−24	35	
24	Kolos Poltava (R)	46	10	14	22	21	44	−23	34	Relegated

(C) Champions; (Q) Qualified for the phase indicated; (R) Relegated

== Top goalscorers ==
The following were the top ten goalscorers.

#	Scorer	Goals (Pen.)	Team
1	Serhiy Shevchenko	32	Nyva Vinnytsia
2	Fedir Vasylchenko	28	Shakhtar Horlivka
3	Volodymyr Shyshkov	25	Spartak Zhytomyr
4	Serhiy Shmundiak	22	Bukovyna Chernivtsi
5	Viktor Oliynyk	20	Bukovyna Chernivtsi
6	Yuriy Tarasov	18	Mayak Kharkiv
6	Hryhoriy Lazarko	18	Frunzenets Sumy
6	Oleksandr Novikov	18	Kolos Mezhyrich

== See also ==
- Soviet Second League
