= 1993–94 FC Desna Chernihiv season =

FC Desna Chernihiv season 1993–94

FC Desna Chernihiv
1993–94 season
- President: Ivan Fedorets
- Manager: Andriy Protsko (caretaker); Viktor Dubino
- Stadium: Chernihiv Stadium
- Ukrainian First League: 20th (Relegated)
- Ukrainian Cup: 1/16 finals
- Top goalscorer: Igor Chetverik (9)
- Highest home attendance: 8000 (vs Khimik Sievierodonetsk, 7 April 1994)
- Lowest home attendance: 300 (vs FC Dynamo-2 Kyiv, 28 October 1993)
- Biggest win: Desna Chernihiv 3-0 Artania Ochakiv
- Biggest defeat: Evis Mykolaiv 6-0 Desna Chernihiv
Home colours	Away colours

For the 1993–94 season, FC Desna Chernihiv competed for the third consecutive time in the Ukrainian First League, from which it was relegated to the Ukrainian Second League.The club played its matches at the Chernihiv Stadium.

== Season summary ==
In July 1993, before the start of the season, the head coach Yuriy Hruznov was replaced by Andriy Protsko as caretaker until January 1994. During the summer transfer session the club signed Andriy Huz from Khimik Chernihiv and Oleksandr Stelmakh with Oleh Sobekh were promoted to the first team from the SDYuShOR Desna academy. The Georgian defender Gocha Gogokhia and the forward Kakhaberi Sartania were also added to the team's squad. The club further reinforced the club with the signings of Yuriy Denysiuk, Yuriy Cherezov, Volodymyr Kulyk, Ihor Zhornyak, Volodymyr Herasymets and Yuriy Rogovoy. Midfielder Viktor Rudyi and forward Yuriy Ovcharenko also moved to Desna, from Cheksyl Chernihiv and Nyva Vinnytsia, respectively. Despite numerous new signings and a change of coach, the team lost 12 matches, drew 4, and won 3 during the first part of the season. In the Ukrainian Cup, the club reached the Round of 32, where they were eliminated by Torpedo Zaporizhzhia.

In January 1994 Viktor Dubino was appointed head coach until the end of the season. During the winter transfer window, the squad released the goalkeeper Andriy Huz and defender Andriy Bilousov and they being transferred to Tekstylnyk Chernihiv. Yuriy Denysiuk, Viktor Rudyi, Volodymyr Avramenko, Oleksandr Savenchuk, Yuriy Bondarenko, Yuriy Ovcharenko, Volodymyr Herasymets and Gocha Gogokhia also left the club. After the last match in July, the club was relegated in Ukrainian Second League.

== Players ==
=== Squad information ===
As of 30 October 2026

Squad no.	Name	Nationality	Position	Date of birth (age)
Goalkeepers
	Yuriy Melashenko	(Ukraine)	GK	21 April 1970 (aged 23)
	Nikoloz Kheladze	(Georgia (country))	GK	30 May 1972 (aged 21)
	Andriy Huz	(Ukraine)	GK	6 June 1974 (aged 19)
	Oleksandr Stelmakh	(Ukraine)	GK	18 June 1973 (aged 20)
Defenders
	David Rukhadze	(Georgia (country))	DF	6 March 1963 (aged 30)
	Andriy Bilousov	(Ukraine)	DF	14 January 1972 (aged 21)
	Oleksandr Lepekho	(Ukraine)	DF	25 October 1971 (aged 21)
	Yuriy Nadtochiy	(Ukraine)	DF	3 July 1967 (aged 26)
	Oleh Sobekh	(Ukraine)	DF	6 June 1976 (aged 17)
	Kakhaberi Sartania	(Georgia (country))	DF	8 August 1967 (aged 25)
	Andriy Kryvenok	(Ukraine)	DF	2 August 1972 (aged 20)
	Volodymyr Kulyk	(Ukraine)	DF	1 October 1969 (aged 23)
	Ihor Zhornyak	(Ukraine)	DF	25 January 1976 (aged 17)
	Yuriy Cherezov	(Ukraine)	DF	25 March 1970 (aged 23)
	Yuriy Denysiuk	(Ukraine)	DF	10 February 1964 (aged 29)
	Yuriy Esaulov	(Ukraine)	DF	14 January 1962 (aged 31)
	Igor Pakhar	(Ukraine)	DF	5 April 1967 (aged 26)
	Leonid Bumshteyn	(Ukraine)	DF	24 April 1970 (aged 23)
	Valentyn Shuman	(Ukraine)	DF	17 March 1968 (aged 25)
Midfielders
	Yuriy Bondarenko	(Ukraine)	MF	14 January 1972 (aged 21)
	Viktor Rudyi	(Ukraine)	MF	11 February 1972 (aged 21)
	Vladimir Drobot	(Ukraine)	MF	22 June 1969 (aged 24)
	Viktor Rudyi	(Ukraine)	MF	11 February 1962 (aged 31)
	Volodymyr Avramenko	(Ukraine)	MF	22 June 1969 (aged 24)
	Anzor Kavteladze	(Georgia (country))	MF	20 March 1974 (aged 19)
	Ihor Bobovych	(Ukraine)	MF	18 November 1975 (aged 17)
	Igor Simchuk	(Ukraine)	MF	11 February 1972 (aged 21)
	Oleksandr Savenchuk	(Ukraine)	MF	9 March 1975 (aged 18)
Forwards
	Igor Chetverik (Captain)	(Ukraine)	FW	2 June 1965 (aged 28)
	Volodymyr Herasymets	(Ukraine)	FW	2 July 1970 (aged 23)
	Yuriy Ovcharenko	(Ukraine)	FW	25 April 1968 (aged 25)
	Yuriy Rogovoy	(Ukraine)	FW	10 October 1974 (aged 18)
	Gocha Gogokhia	(Georgia (country))	FW	22 June 1969 (aged 24)

== Transfers ==
=== In ===
Date	Pos.	Player	Age	Moving from	Type	Fee	Source
Summer
15 June 1993	GK	(Ukraine) Oleksandr Stelmakh	20	(Ukraine) SDYuShOR Desna	Transfer	Free	
15 June 1993	GK	(Ukraine) Andriy Huz	20	(Ukraine) Khimik Chernihiv	Transfer	Free	
15 June 1993	DF	(Ukraine) Oleh Sobekh	22	(Ukraine) SDYuShOR Desna	Transfer	Free	
15 June 1993	DF	(Georgia (country)) Kakhaberi Sartania	22	(Georgia (country)) Odishi 1919	Transfer	Free	
15 June 1993	DF	(Ukraine) Yuriy Denysiuk	22	(Ukraine) Elektron Romny	Transfer	Free	
15 June 1993	DF	(Ukraine) Yuriy Cherezov	22	Unattached	Transfer	Free	
15 June 1993	DF	(Ukraine) Volodymyr Kulyk	23	(Ukraine) Burevestni Chernihiv	Transfer	Free	
18 June 1993	DF	(Ukraine) Ihor Zhornyak	23	Unattached	Transfer	Free	
18 June 1993	MF	(Ukraine) Volodymyr Herasymets	23	(Ukraine) Ros Bila Tserkva	Transfer	Free	
18 June 1993	MF	(Ukraine) Viktor Rudyi	23	(Ukraine) Cheksyl Chernihiv	Transfer	Free	
15 June 1993	FW	(Ukraine) Yuriy Ovcharenko	23	(Ukraine) Nyva Vinnytsia	Transfer	Free	
16 June 1993	FW	(Georgia (country)) Gocha Gogokhia	25	Unattached	Transfer	Free	
16 June 1993	FW	(Ukraine) Yuriy Rogovoy	25	Unattached	Transfer	Free	
Winter
15 June 1993	MF	(Ukraine) Yuriy Esaulov	20	(Georgia (country)) Khimyk Zhytomyr	Transfer	Free	
15 June 1993	GK	(Georgia (country)) Nikoloz Kheladze	20	(Georgia (country)) Magaroeli Chiatura	Transfer	Free	
8 January 2023	MF	(Georgia (country)) Anzor Kavteladze	24	(Georgia (country)) Chiatura	Transfer	Free	
8 January 2023	MF	(Georgia (country)) David Rukhadze	24	(Georgia (country)) Chiatura	Transfer	Free	

=== Out ===
Date	Pos.	Player	Age	Moving to	Type	Fee	Source
Summer
8 June 19934	FW	(Ukraine) Yuriy Yakovenko	20	(Ukraine) Kryvbas Kryvyi Rih	Transfer	Free	
Winter
8 January 1994	GK	(Ukraine) Andriy Huz	20	(Ukraine) Tekstylnyk Chernihiv	Transfer	Free	
8 January 1994	DF	(Ukraine) Andriy Bilousov	23	(Ukraine) Tekstylnyk Chernihiv	Transfer	Free	
8 January 1994	DF	(Ukraine) Oleksandr Lepekho	23	(Ukraine) Tekstylnyk Chernihiv	Transfer	Free	
8 January 1994	DF	(Ukraine) Yuriy Denysiuk	22	(Ukraine) Dunay Izmail	Transfer	Free	
8 January 1994	MF	(Ukraine) Viktor Rudyi	23	(Ukraine) Nyva Vinnytsia	Transfer	Free	
8 January 1994	MF	(Ukraine) Volodymyr Avramenko	20	(Ukraine) Dnipro	On Loan	Free	
9 January 1994	MF	(Ukraine) Oleksandr Savenchuk	23	(Ukraine) Torpedo Zaporizhzhia	On Loan	Free	
9 January 1994	MF	(Ukraine) Yuriy Bondarenko	23	(Ukraine) Torpedo Zaporizhzhia	Transfer	Free	
10 January 1994	FW	(Ukraine) Yuriy Ovcharenko	23	(Ukraine) Nyva Vinnytsia	On Loan	Free	
10 January 1994	MF	(Ukraine) Volodymyr Herasymets	23	(Ukraine) Nyva Vinnytsia	Transfer	Free	
10 January 1994	FW	(Georgia (country)) Gocha Gogokhia	25	(Ukraine) Stroitel (Brovary)	Transfer	Free	

== Competitions ==
=== Overall ===
Competition	First match	Last match	Starting round	Final position	Record							
Competition	First match	Last match	Starting round	Final position	Pld	W	D	L	GF	GA	GD	Win %
First League	15 August 1993	3 July 1994	Matchday 1	20th	38	7	10	21	29	56	−27	18.42
Cup	1 August 1993	3 November 1993	First preliminary round	Round of 32 (1/16)	4	3	0	1	10	5	+5	75.00
Total					42	10	10	22	39	61	−22	23.81

Last updated: 30 October 2026
Source: Competitions

=== Ukrainian First League ===
15 August 1993 1	Krystal Chortkiv	2–1	Desna Chernihiv	Chortkiv
19:00 EEST (UTC+03:00)	Leonidov 22'; Zelenyuk 89'	Report	Bondarenko 73'	Attendance: 2500

19 August 1993 2	Nord-Am-Podillia Khmelnytskyi	3–0	Desna Chernihiv	Khmelnytskyi
19:00 EEST (UTC+03:00)	Yaremenko 17'; Yaremenko 70'; Kharkivshchenko 75'	Report		Stadium: Stadium Podillia; Attendance: 4500

25 August 1993 3	Desna Chernihiv	0–1	Vorskla Poltava	Chernihiv
19:00 EEST (UTC+03:00)		Report	Kryvenok 56'; Kulyk 77'	Stadium: Stadion Yuri Gagarin; Attendance: 2000

29 August 1993 4	Desna Chernihiv	2–0	Polihraftekhnika Oleksandria	Chernihiv
19:00 EEST (UTC+03:00)		Report	Kryvenok 56'; Kulyk 77'	Stadium: Stadion Yuri Gagarin; Attendance: 2000

29 August 1993 5	Khimik Zhytomyr	2–1	Desna Chernihiv	Zhytomyr
19:00 EEST (UTC+03:00)	Leonov 12'; Vasylyshyn 44'	Report	Drobot 12'	Stadium: Stadion Zhytomyr; Attendance: 2000

14 September 1993 6	Metalurh Nikopol	3–1	Desna Chernihiv	Nikopol
19:00 EEST (UTC+03:00)	Zaitsev 51'; Grigorovich 63'; Grigorovich 71'	Report	Chetverik 85'	Stadium: Elektrometalurh Stadium; Attendance: 3500

17 September 1993 7	Evis Mykolaiv	6–0	Desna Chernihiv	Mykolaiv
19:00 EEST (UTC+03:00)	Myzenko 9'; Ulianytskyi 31'; Zabranskyi 43'; Kudlyuk 45'; Myzenko 53'; Zabranskyi 85'	Report		Stadium: Tsentralnyi Stadion; Attendance: 7000

24 September 1993 8	Desna Chernihiv	3–0	Artania Ochakiv	Chernihiv
19:00 EEST (UTC+03:00)	Nadtochiy 4'; Bondarenko 8'; Kulyk 69'	Report		Stadium: Stadion Yuri Gagarin; Attendance: 1500

27 September 1993 9	Desna Chernihiv	1–1	SC Odesa	Chernihiv
19:00 EEST (UTC+03:00)	Chetverik 34'	Report	Parkhomenko 44'	Stadium: Stadion Yuri Gagarin; Attendance: 1000

4 October 1993 10	Skala Stryi	1–0	Desna Chernihiv	Stryi
19:00 EEST (UTC+03:00)	Voloshyn 34'	Report		Stadium: Sokil Stadium; Attendance: 2000

7 October 1993 11	Prykarpattia Ivano-Frankivsk	2–1	Desna Chernihiv	Ivano-Frankivsk
19:00 EEST (UTC+03:00)	Yurchenko 8'; Turyanskyi 40'	Report	Chetverik 77'	Stadium: Elektron Stadium; Attendance: 4000

12 October 1993 12	Desna Chernihiv	0–0	Karpaty Mukacheve	Chernihiv
19:00 EEST (UTC+03:00)		Report		Stadium: Stadion Yuri Gagarin; Attendance: 1500

15 October 1993 13	Desna Chernihiv	1–0	Zakarpattia Uzhhorod	Chernihiv
19:00 EEST (UTC+03:00)	Chetverik 6'	Report		Stadium: Stadion Yuri Gagarin; Attendance: 1500

25 October 1993 14	Dnipro Cherkasy	2–0	Desna Chernihiv	Cherkasy
19:00 EEST (UTC+03:00)	Goldin 63'; Shkolnikov 78'	Report		Stadium: Tsentralnyi Stadion; Attendance: 2500

28 October 1993 15	Dynamo-2 Kyiv	2–0	Desna Chernihiv	Kyiv
19:00 EEST (UTC+03:00)	Mintenko 44'; Zavyalov 63'	Report		Stadium: Dynamo Stadium; Attendance: 300

9 November 1993 16	Desna Chernihiv	1–1	Stal Alchevsk	Chernihiv
19:00 EEST (UTC+03:00)	Kryvenok 6'	Report	Plotnikov 49'	Stadium: Stadion Yuri Gagarin; Attendance: 500

12 November 1993 17	Desna Chernihiv	1–1	Khimik Sievierodonetsk	Chernihiv
19:00 EEST (UTC+03:00)	Savenchuk 48'	Report	Skripnikov 62'	Stadium: Stadion Yuri Gagarin; Attendance: 500

18 November 1993 18	SBTS Sumy	2–1	Desna Chernihiv	Sumy
19:00 EEST (UTC+03:00)	Targonsky 57'; Lukash 88'	Report	Chetverik 75'	Stadium: Avanhard Stadium; Attendance: 500

21 November 1993 19	Naftovyk Okhtyrka	3–0	Desna Chernihiv	Okhtyrka
19:00 EEST (UTC+03:00)	Grachev 21'; Piskun 44'; Musolitin 44'	Report		Stadium: Naftovyk Stadium; Attendance: 1500

27 March 1994 20	Desna Chernihiv	0–0	Naftovyk Okhtyrka	Chernihiv
19:00 EEST (UTC+03:00)		Report		Stadium: Stadion Yuri Gagarin; Attendance: 4000

30 March 1994 21	Desna Chernihiv	0–0	SBTS Sumy	Chernihiv
19:00 EEST (UTC+03:00)		Report		Stadium: Stadion Yuri Gagarin; Attendance: 2000

7 April 1994 22	Khimik Siverodonetsk	2–0	Desna Chernihiv	Sievierodonetsk
19:00 EEST (UTC+03:00)	Babenko 35'; Zhevachenko 70'	Report		Stadium: Khimik Stadium; Attendance: 8000

10 April 1994 23	Stal Alchevsk	1–0	Desna Chernihiv	Alchevsk
19:00 EEST (UTC+03:00)	Babenko 35'	Report		Stadium: Stadium Stal; Attendance: 7000

17 April 1994 24	Desna Chernihiv	0–1	Dynamo-2 Kyiv	Chernihiv
19:00 EEST (UTC+03:00)		Report	Shevchenko 86'	Stadium: Stadion Yuri Gagarin; Attendance: 2000

20 April 1994 25	Desna Chernihiv	1–1	Dnipro Cherkasy	Chernihiv
19:00 EEST (UTC+03:00)	Chetverik 41'	Report	Prokhorenkov 40'	Stadium: Stadion Yuri Gagarin; Attendance: 2000

27 April 1994 26	Zakarpattia Uzhhorod	1–1	Desna Chernihiv	Uzhhorod
19:00 EEST (UTC+03:00)	Guntey 22'	Report	Chetverik 52'	Stadium: Stadium Avanhard; Attendance: 1000

29 April 1994 27	Karpaty Mukacheve	3–2	Desna Chernihiv	Uzhhorod
19:00 EEST (UTC+03:00)	Rusin 12'; Karibov 20'; Bako 51'	Report	Gogokhia 39'; Gogokhia 51'	Stadium: Stadium Avanhard; Attendance: 3500

8 May 1994 28	Desna Chernihiv	0–1	Prykarpattia Ivano-Frankivsk	Chernihiv
19:00 EEST (UTC+03:00)		Report	Irichuk 27'	Stadium: Stadion Yuri Gagarin; Attendance: 2000

11 May 1994 29	Desna Chernihiv	2–0	Skala Stryi	Chernihiv
19:00 EEST (UTC+03:00)	Gogokhia 34'; Sobekh 69'	Report		Stadium: Stadion Yuri Gagarin; Attendance: 2000

19 May 1994 30	SC Odesa	3–1	Desna Chernihiv	Odesa
19:00 EEST (UTC+03:00)	Georgievich 59'; Holovatsky 70'; Melnychenko 90'	Report	Chetverik 88'	Stadium: SKA Stadium; Attendance: 1200

22 May 1994 31	Artania Ochakiv	1–0	Desna Chernihiv	Ochakiv
19:00 EEST (UTC+03:00)	Andreyko 89'	Report		Stadium: Sokół Stadion; Attendance: 2000

30 May 1994 32	Desna Chernihiv	2–2	SBTS Sumy	Chernihiv
19:00 EEST (UTC+03:00)	Chetverik 50'; Ovcharenko 70'	Report	Sorokin 50'; Sorokin 89'	Stadium: Stadion Yuri Gagarin; Attendance: 2000

2 June 1994 33	Desna Chernihiv	1–0	Metalurh Nikopol	Chernihiv
19:00 EEST (UTC+03:00)	Kulyk 72'	Report		Stadium: Stadion Yuri Gagarin; Attendance: 2500

12 June 1994 34	Desna Chernihiv	1–0	Khimik Zhytomyr	Chernihiv
19:00 EEST (UTC+03:00)	Chetverik 76'	Report		Stadium: Stadion Yuri Gagarin; Attendance: 2000

20 June 1994 35	Polihraftekhnika Oleksandria	3–1	Desna Chernihiv	Oleksandriia
19:00 EEST (UTC+03:00)	Shazhko 29'; Bohatyr 68'; Chuichenko 61'	Report	Ovcharenko 90'	Stadium: Olimp Stadium; Attendance: 6000

23 June 1994 36	Khimik Zhytomyr	1–0	Desna Chernihiv	Zhytomyr
19:00 EEST (UTC+03:00)	Manasyan 86'	Report		Stadium: Stadium Vorskla; Attendance: 4000

30 June 1994 37	Desna Chernihiv	3–1	Nord-Am-Podillia Khmelnytskyi	Chernihiv
19:00 EEST (UTC+03:00)	Rogovoy 42'; Gogokhia 50'; Kryvenok 75'	Report	Bordyug 53'	Stadium: Stadion Yuri Gagarin; Attendance: 1000

3 July 1994 38	Desna Chernihiv	0–0	Karpaty Mukacheve	Chernihiv
19:00 EEST (UTC+03:00)		Report		Stadium: Stadion Yuri Gagarin; Attendance: 1000

=== Final standings ===
Pos	Team	Pld	W	D	L	GF	GA	GD	Pts	Promotion or relegation
1	Prykarpattia Ivano-Frankivsk (C, P)	38	26	7	5	81	33	+48	59	Promoted to Vyshcha Liha
2	Evis Mykolaiv (P)	38	25	6	7	76	32	+44	56	Promoted to Vyshcha Liha
3	Polihraftekhnika Oleksandria	38	22	11	5	62	22	+40	55	
4	Stal Alchevsk	38	22	7	9	56	40	+16	51	
5	Naftovyk Okhtyrka	38	19	10	9	57	28	+29	48	
6	Dnipro Cherkasy	38	19	7	12	56	39	+17	45	
7	Dynamo-2 Kyiv	38	16	8	14	50	37	+13	40	
8	Vorskla Poltava	38	15	7	16	30	52	−22	37	
9	Metalurh Nikopol	38	15	6	17	44	56	−12	36	
10	Khimik Zhytomyr	38	14	8	16	39	47	−8	36	
11	Nord-Am-Podillia Khmelnytskyi	38	13	9	16	45	47	−2	35	
12	Khimik Siverodonetsk	38	12	9	17	37	46	−9	33	
13	SC Odesa	38	12	9	17	43	54	−11	33	
14	Zakarpattia Uzhhorod	38	12	8	18	33	53	−20	32	
15	Karpaty Mukacheve	38	12	7	19	41	57	−16	31	
16	Skala Stryi	38	11	7	20	36	48	−12	29	
17	Krystal Chortkiv	38	10	9	19	29	41	−12	29	
18	SBTS Sumy	38	11	5	22	39	58	−19	27	
19	Artania Ochakiv (R)	38	9	6	23	29	69	−40	24	Relegated to Second League
20	Desna Chernihiv (R)	38	7	10	21	29	53	−24	24	Relegated to Second League

(C) Champions; (P) Promoted; (R) Relegated

=== Ukrainian Cup ===
Desna Chernihiv qualified for the Round of 32 (1/16) and ben eliminated by Torpedo Zaporizhzhia.

1 August 1993 Round of 62 (1/32)	Spartak (Okhtyrka)	0–2	Desna Chernihiv	Trostianets
17:00 EEST (UTC+03:00)		Report		Stadium: Stadion imeni V. Kutsa; Attendance: 1000

7 August 1993 Round of 32 (1/16)	Desna Chernihiv	5–1	Sula Lubny	Chernihiv
EEST (UTC+3)		Report		Stadium: Stadion Yuri Gagarin; Attendance: 1500

20 October 1993 Round of 32 (1/16)	Desna Chernihiv	1–0	Torpedo Zaporizhzhia	Chernihiv
EEST (UTC+3)	Avramenko 29'	Report		Stadium: Stadion Yuri Gagarin; Attendance: 2500; Referee: Oleksandr Tyutyun

3 November 1993 Round of 32 (1/16)	Torpedo Zaporizhzhia	4–2	Desna Chernihiv	Zaporizhia
EEST (UTC+3)	Zinich 32', 51', 83'; Yesipov 71'	Report	Kulyk 53'; Savenchuk 81'	Stadium: AvtoZAZ Stadium; Attendance: 1500; Referee: Oleksandr Hordiyenko (Dnipropetrovsk)

== Statistics ==
=== Appearances and goals ===
No.	Pos	Nat	Player	Total		Ukrainian First League		Ukrainian Cup		Play-offs	
No.	Pos	Nat	Player	Apps	Goals	Apps	Goals	Apps	Goals	Apps	Goals
Goalkeepers
	GK	(Ukraine) UKR	Yuriy Melashenko	35	0	31	0	4	0	0	0
	GK	(Ukraine) UKR	Yuriy Ovcharov	6	0	5	0	1	0	0	0
	GK	(Georgia (country)) GEO	Nikoloz Kheladze	2	0	2	0	0	0	0	0
	GK	(Ukraine) UKR	Oleksandr Stelmakh	0	0	0	0	0	0	0	0
Defenders
	DF	(Georgia (country)) GEO	David Rukhadze	9	0	9	0	0	0	0	0
	DF	(Ukraine) UKR	Yuriy Cherezov	13	1	10	1	3	0	0	0
	DF	(Ukraine) UKR	Yuriy Esaulov	16	1	16	1	0	0	0	0
	DF	(Ukraine) UKR	Igor Pakhar	35	0	31	0	4	0	0	0
	DF	(Ukraine) UKR	Leonid Bumshteyn	13	0	9	0	4	0	0	0
	DF	(Ukraine) UKR	Valentyn Shuman	16	0	12	0	4	0	0	0
	DF	(Ukraine) UKR	Oleksandr Lepekho	12	0	12	0	0	0	0	0
	DF	(Ukraine) UKR	Yuriy Nadtochiy	39	1	37	1	2	0	0	0
	DF	(Ukraine) UKR	Oleh Sobekh	11	1	11	1	0	0	0	0
	DF	(Georgia (country)) GEO	Kakhaberi Sartania	17	0	17	0	0	0	0	0
	DF	(Ukraine) UKR	Andriy Kryvenok	39	3	36	3	3	0	0	0
	DF	(Ukraine) UKR	Volodymyr Kulyk	41	5	37	3	4	2	0	0
	DF	(Ukraine) UKR	Ihor Zhornyak	3	0	3	0	0	0	0	0
Midfielders
	MF	(Ukraine) UKR	Igor Simchuk	9	0	7	0	2	0	0	0
	MF	(Georgia (country)) GEO	Anzor Kavteladze	18	0	18	0	0	0	0	0
	MF	(Ukraine) UKR	Ihor Bobovych	18	0	18	0	0	0	0	0
	MF	(Ukraine) UKR	Vladimir Drobot	13	3	10	1	3	2	0	0
Forwards
	FW	(Ukraine) UKR	Volodymyr Herasymets	3	0	3	0	0	0	0	0
	FW	(Ukraine) UKR	Yuriy Rogovoy	5	1	4	1	1	0	0	0
	FW	(Ukraine) UKR	Igor Chetverik	35	10	31	9	4	1	0	0
Players transferred out during the season
	GK	(Ukraine) UKR	Andriy Huz	2	0	2	0	0	0	0	0
	DF	(Ukraine) UKR	Yuriy Denysiuk	19	0	19	0	0	0	0	0
	DF	(Ukraine) UKR	Andriy Bilousov	19	0	16	0	3	0	0	0
	DF	(Ukraine) UKR	Oleksandr Lepekho	20	4	16	1	4	3	0	0
	MF	(Ukraine) UKR	Volodymyr Avramenko	20	2	16	0	4	2	0	0
	MF	(Ukraine) UKR	Viktor Rudyi	9	0	9	0	0	0	0	0
	MF	(Ukraine) UKR	Yuriy Bondarenko	22	2	18	2	4	0	0	0
	MF	(Ukraine) UKR	Oleksandr Savenchuk	20	4	16	1	4	3	0	0
	FW	(Ukraine) UKR	Yuriy Ovcharenko	5	2	5	2	0	0	0	0
	FW	(Georgia (country)) GEO	Gocha Gogokhia	13	4	13	4	0	0	0	0

Source: Competitions

Last updated: 30 October 2026

=== Goalscorers ===
Rank	No.	Pos	Nat	Name	Ukrainian First League	Ukrainian Cup	Play Offs	Total
1		FW	(Ukraine)	Igor Chetverik	9	0	0	9
2		DF	(Ukraine)	Volodymyr Kulyk	3	2	0	5
3		FW	(Georgia (country))	Gocha Gogokhia	4	0	0	4
4		MF	(Ukraine)	Oleksandr Savenchuk	1	3	0	4
5		DF	(Ukraine)	Andriy Kryvenok	3	0	0	3
6		MF	(Ukraine)	Vladimir Drobot	1	2	0	3
7		FW	(Ukraine)	Yuriy Ovcharenko	2	0	0	2
8		MF	(Ukraine)	Yuriy Bondarenko	2	0	0	2
9		MF	(Ukraine)	Volodymyr Avramenko	0	2	0	2
10		DF	(Ukraine)	Yuriy Cherezov	1	1	0	2
11		DF	(Ukraine)	Yuriy Nadtochiy	1	0	0	1
12		FW	(Ukraine)	Yuriy Rogovoy	1	0	0	1
13		DF	(Ukraine)	Oleh Sobekh	1	0	0	1
				Total	28	10	0	38

Last updated: 2 May 2023

=== Clean sheets ===
Rank	No.	Pos	Nat	Name	Ukrainian First League	Ukrainian Cup	Play-offs	Total
1	1	GK	(Ukraine)	Yuriy Melashenko	9	2	0	11
				Total	9	2	0	11

Last updated: 29 October 2026

=== Disciplinary record ===
No.	Pos	Nat	Player	First League			Ukrainian Cup			Play-offs			Total		
No.	Pos	Nat	Player	Yellow card	(yellow card) (yellow-red card)	Red card	Yellow card	(yellow card) (yellow-red card)	Red card	Yellow card	(yellow card) (yellow-red card)	Red card	Yellow card	(yellow card) (yellow-red card)	Red card
	DF	(Ukraine)	Yuriy Esaulov	4	0	0	0	0	0	0	0	0	4	0	0
	MF	(Ukraine)	Anatoly Havrilovsky	2	0	0	0	0	0	0	0	0	2	0	0
	DF	(Ukraine)	Igor Pakhar	2	0	0	1	0	0	0	0	0	3	0	0
	DF	(Ukraine)	Oleh Sobekh	2	0	0	0	0	0	0	0	0	2	0	0
	DF	(Georgia (country))	David Rukhadze	1	0	1	0	0	0	0	0	0	1	0	1
	MF	(Ukraine)	Vladimir Drobot	1	0	0	0	0	0	0	0	0	1	0	0
	DF	(Ukraine)	Andriy Bilousov	1	0	0	0	0	0	0	0	0	1	0	0
	DF	(Ukraine)	Valentyn Shuman	1	0	0	0	0	0	0	0	0	1	0	0
	DF	(Ukraine)	Yuriy Cherezov	1	0	0	0	0	0	0	0	0	1	0	0
	MF	(Ukraine)	Viktor Rudyi	1	0	0	0	0	0	0	0	0	1	0	0
	MF	(Georgia (country))	Anzor Kavteladze	1	0	0	0	0	0	0	0	0	1	0	0
	MF	(Ukraine)	Ihor Bobovych	1	0	0	0	0	0	0	0	0	1	0	0
	DF	(Ukraine)	Andriy Kryvenok	1	0	0	0	0	0	0	0	0	1	0	0
	DF	(Ukraine)	Andriy Kryvenok	1	0	0	0	0	0	0	0	0	1	0	0
	FW	(Ukraine)	Igor Chetverik	1	0	0	0	0	0	0	0	0	1	0	0
	FW	(Ukraine)	Yuriy Ovcharenko	1	0	0	0	0	0	0	0	0	1	0	0
	GK	(Georgia (country))	Nikoloz Kheladze	1	0	0	0	0	0	0	0	0	1	0	0
	FW	(Georgia (country))	Gocha Gogokhia	0	0	1	0	0	0	0	0	0	1	0	1
	MF	(Ukraine)	Yuriy Bondarenko	0	0	0	1	0	0	0	0	0	1	0	0
			Total	21	0	2	2	0	0	0	0	0	23	0	2

Last updated: 30 October 2026
