= 1991 FC Desna Chernihiv season =

FC Desna Chernihiv
1991 season
- President: Ivan Fedorets
- Manager: Yuriy Hruznov
- Stadium: Chernihiv Stadium
- Football Championship of the Ukrainian SSR: 13th of 14 Group A
- Football Cup of the Ukrainian SSR: 1/4 finals
- Top goalscorer: Yuriy Yakovenko, Igor Chetverik (12)
Home colours	Away colours

For the 1991 season, FC Desna Chernihiv competed in the Soviet Lower Second League, Zone 1.

== Season summary ==
The club participates in the Football Championship of the Ukrainian SSR for the last time before the Dissolution of the Soviet Union. Before the start of the season the club signed new players such as Yuriy Ovcharov, Andriy Bilousov, Serhiy Panich, Mayak Ochakov, Vitaliy Sokolov, Valeriy Husev, Volodymyr Avramenko, Vitaliy Arinin and Oleksandr Ilyich. At the same time, several players left the club, including Dmytro Tyapushkin, Vadym Postovoy, Alexander Likhobitsky, Svyatoslav Petrenko, Viktor Rudyi, Pyotr Andreevich, and Ivan Bulovchak. Desna Chernihiv finished the Football Championship of the Ukrainian SSR in thirteenth place, with 20 wins, 9 draws, and 21 losses. In the Ukrainian SSR Cup, they reached the quarter-finals, where they were eliminated by Kryvbas Kryvyi Rih.

== Players ==
=== Squad information ===
As of 1 November 2026

Squad no.	Name	Nationality	Position	Date of birth (age)
Goalkeepers
	Yuriy Melashenko	(Soviet Union)	GK	21 April 1970 (aged 21)
	Yuriy Ovcharov	(Soviet Union)	GK	19 March 1966 (aged 25)
Defenders
	Yuriy Nadtochiy	(Soviet Union)	DF	3 July 1967 (aged 24)
	Andriy Kryvenok	(Soviet Union)	DF	2 August 1972 (aged 18)
	Andriy Bilousov	(Soviet Union)	DF	14 January 1972 (aged 19)
	Leonid Bumstein	(Soviet Union)	DF	24 April 1970 (aged 21)
	Valeriy Husev	(Soviet Union)	DF	13 February 1970 (aged 21)
	Andriy Moscalets	(Soviet Union)	DF	5 May 1969 (aged 22)
	Oleksandr Lepekho	(Soviet Union)	DF	25 October 1971 (aged 19)
	Oleksandr Lykhobytskiy	(Soviet Union)	DF	12 August 1962 (aged 28)
	Ihor Pakhar	(Soviet Union)	DF	5 April 1967 (aged 24)
	Valentyn Shuman	(Soviet Union)	DF	17 March 1968 (aged 23)
	Yuriy Esaulov	(Soviet Union)	DF	14 January 1962 (aged 29)
	Serhiy Sapronov	(Soviet Union)	DF	21 October 1961 (aged 29)
Midfielders
	Yuriy Bondarenko	(Soviet Union)	MF	14 January 1972 (aged 19)
	Serhiy Panich	(Soviet Union)	MF	21 November 1971 (aged 19)
	Vitaliy Sokolov	(Soviet Union)	MF	1 November 1967 (aged 23)
	Valeriy Hritsenko	(Soviet Union)	MF	12 February 1967 (aged 24)
	Oleksandr Savenchuk	(Soviet Union)	MF	9 March 1975 (aged 16)
	Volodymyr Avramenko	(Soviet Union)	MF	22 June 1969 (aged 22)
	Vladimir Drobot	(Soviet Union)	MF	22 June 1969 (aged 22)
	Serhiy Zelinskyi	(Soviet Union)	MF	14 January 1972 (aged 19)
Forwards
	Oleksandr Ilyich	(Soviet Union)	FW	3 August 1973 (aged 17)
	Vitaliy Arinin	(Soviet Union)	FW	25 March 1970 (aged 21)
	Igor Chetverik (Captain)	(Soviet Union)	FW	2 June 1965 (aged 26)
	Yuriy Yakovenko	(Soviet Union)	FW	19 December 1971 (aged 19)
	Volodymyr Avramenko	(Soviet Union)	FW	20 March 1974 (aged 17)
	Yuriy Ovcharenko	(Soviet Union)	FW	25 April 1968 (aged 23)

== Transfers ==
=== In ===
Date	Pos.	Player	Age	Moving from	Type	Fee	Source
Summer
9 January 1991	GK	(Soviet Union) Yuriy Ovcharov	24	(Soviet Union) Kosonsoy	Transfer	Free	
9 January 1991	DF	(Soviet Union) Andriy Bilousov	19	Unattached	Transfer	Free	
9 January 1991	MF	(Soviet Union) Serhiy Panich	19	(Soviet Union) Mayak Ochakov	Transfer	Free	
9 January 1991	MF	(Soviet Union) Vitaliy Sokolov	23	(Soviet Union) Fakel Krasnohrad FC	Transfer	Free	
9 January 1991	MF	(Soviet Union) Valeriy Husev	21	(Soviet Union) Volyn Lutsk	Transfer	Free	
10 January 1991	FW	(Soviet Union) Volodymyr Avramenko	22	Unattached	Transfer	Free	
11 January 1991	FW	(Soviet Union) Vitaliy Arinin	21	Unattached	Transfer	Free	
11 January 1991	FW	(Soviet Union) Oleksandr Ilyich	17	(Soviet Union) Meliorator Kakhovka	Transfer	Free	

=== Out ===
Date	Pos.	Player	Age	Moving to	Type	Fee	Source
Summer
7 January 1991	GK	(Soviet Union) Dmytro Tyapushkin	21	(Soviet Union) Nyva Ternopil	Transfer	Free	
9 January 1991	DF	(Soviet Union) Vadym Postovoy	21	Unattached	Transfer	Free	
10 January 1991	MF	(Soviet Union) Alexander Likhobitsky	21	(Soviet Union) Zhenis	Transfer	Free	
10 January 1991	MF	(Soviet Union) Svyatoslav Petrenko	21	(Soviet Union) Dynamo Makhachkala	Transfer	Free	
10 January 1991	MF	(Soviet Union) Viktor Rudyi	21	(Soviet Union) Naftovyk Okhtyrka	Transfer	Free	
10 January 1991	MF	(Soviet Union) Andreevich Pyotr	21	(Soviet Union) Caspiy	Transfer	Free	
11 January 1991	FW	(Soviet Union) Ivan Bulovchak	21	(Czechoslovakia) Trenčín	Transfer	Free	

== Competitions ==
=== Overall ===
Competition	First match	Last match	Starting round	Final position	Record							
Competition	First match	Last match	Starting round	Final position	Pld	W	D	L	GF	GA	GD	Win %
Soviet Second League	7 April 1991	12 November 1991	Matchday 1	13th	50	20	9	21	59	59	+0	40.00
Cup	30 March 1991	19 September 1991	First preliminary round	Round of 32 (1/16)	5	3	2	0	10	3	+7	60.00
Total					55	23	11	21	69	62	+7	41.82

Last updated: 1 November 2026
Source: Competitions

== Final standings ==
Pos	Team	Pld	W	D	L	GF	GA	GD	Pts	Promotion or relegation
1	FC Naftovyk Okhtyrka (C, P)	50	29	17	4	87	34	+53	75	Promoted
2	FC Prykarpattia Ivano-Frankivsk (P)	50	31	9	10	86	43	+43	71	Promoted
3	FC Kolos Nikopol	50	28	13	9	86	45	+41	69	
4	FC Veres Rivne	50	28	13	9	67	38	+29	69	
5	FC Pryladyst Mukachevo	50	24	14	12	67	42	+25	62	
6	FC Krystal Kherson	50	23	15	12	82	60	+22	61	
7	FC Dynamo Bila Tserkva	50	25	9	16	69	50	+19	59	
8	FC Avtomobilist Sumy	50	20	14	16	51	40	+11	54	
9	FC Temp Shepetivka (P)	50	19	15	16	64	53	+11	53	Promoted
10	FC Polissya Zhytomyr	50	22	7	21	64	66	−2	51	
11	FC Kryvbas Kryvyi Rih	50	19	13	18	75	64	+11	51	
12	FC Shakhtar Pavlohrad	50	19	12	19	84	66	+18	50	
13	FC Desna Chernihiv	50	20	9	21	59	59	0	49	
14	FC Podillya Khmelnytskyi	50	18	13	19	54	55	−1	49	
15	FC Zakarpattia Uzhhorod	50	20	8	22	59	64	−5	48	
16	FC Karpaty Kamyanka-Buzka	50	15	15	20	48	55	−7	45	
17	FC Stal Kommunarsk	50	15	15	20	58	73	−15	45	
18	FC Dnipro Cherkasy	50	17	10	23	47	59	−12	44	
19	FC Khimik Severodonetsk	50	15	13	22	52	70	−18	43	
20	FC Vahonobudivnyk Stakhanov	50	17	8	25	56	75	−19	42	
21	SKA Kyiv	50	11	20	19	48	60	−12	42	
22	FC Chaika Sevastopol	50	13	15	22	58	77	−19	41	
23	FC Mayak Ochakiv	50	15	10	25	51	76	−25	40	
24	FC Okean Kerch (R)	50	15	10	25	49	72	−23	40	Relegated
25	FC Zirka Kirovohrad (R)	50	12	13	25	55	90	−35	37	Relegated
26	FC Mayak Kharkiv (R)	50	0	10	40	31	121	−90	10	Relegated

(C) Champions; (P) Promoted; (R) Relegated

=== Soviet Lower Second League, Zone 1 ===
7 April 1991 1	Zakarpattia Uzhhorod	1–1	Desna Chernihiv	Uzhhorod
19:00 EEST (UTC+03:00)		Report

10 April 1991 2	Karpaty Kamyanka-Buzka	0–0	Desna Chernihiv	Kamianka-Buzka
19:00 EEST (UTC+03:00)		Report

=== Cup of the Ukrainian SSR ===
30 March 1991 Round of 32 (1/16)	Kolos Nikopol	1–1	Desna Chernihiv	Nikopol
EEST (UTC+3)		Report		Stadium: Elektrometalurh Stadium

2 April 1991 Round of 32 (1/16)	Desna Chernihiv	1–0	Kolos Nikopol	Chernihiv
EEST (UTC+3)		Report		Stadium: Chernihiv Stadium

29 April 1991 Round of 16 (1/8)	Desna Chernihiv	5–1	Vahonobudivnyk Stakhanov	Chernihiv
EEST (UTC+3)		Report		Stadium: Chernihiv Stadium

28 June 1991 Round of 16 (1/8)	Vahonobudivnyk Stakhanov	0–2	Desna Chernihiv	Nikopol
EEST (UTC+3)		Report		Stadium: Elektrometalurh Stadium

2 July 2026 Round of 8 (1/4)	Desna Chernihiv	1–1	Kryvbas Kryvyi Rih	Chernihiv
EEST (UTC+3)		Report		Stadium: Chernihiv Stadium; Attendance: 2000

17 September 1991 Round of 8 (1/4)	Kryvbas Kryvyi Rih	0–0	Desna Chernihiv	Kryvyi Rih
EEST (UTC+3)		Report		Stadium: Metalurh Stadium; Attendance: 300

== Statistics ==
=== Appearances and goals ===
No.	Pos	Nat	Player	Total		Soviet Second League		Cup of the Ukrainian SSR		Play-offs	
No.	Pos	Nat	Player	Apps	Goals	Apps	Goals	Apps	Goals	Apps	Goals
Goalkeepers
	GK	(Soviet Union) URS	Yuriy Melashenko	37	0	37	0	0	0	0	0
	GK	(Soviet Union) URS	Yuriy Ovcharov	14	0	14	0	0	0	0	0
Defenders
	DF	(Soviet Union) URS	Igor Pakhar	42	0	42	0	0	0	0	0
	DF	(Soviet Union) URS	Yuriy Nadtochiy	47	1	47	1	0	0	0	0
	DF	(Soviet Union) URS	Andriy Kryvenok	0	0	0	0	0	0	0	0
	DF	(Soviet Union) URS	Serhiy Sapronov	45	2	45	2	0	0	0	0
	DF	(Soviet Union) URS	Andriy Bilousov	8	0	8	0	0	0	0	0
	DF	(Soviet Union) URS	Andriy Moscalets	1	0	1	0	0	0	0	0
Midfielders
	MF	(Soviet Union) URS	Yuriy Bondarenko	43	0	43	0	0	0	0	0
	MF	(Soviet Union) URS	Valeriy Gusev	36	2	36	2	0	0	0	0
	MF	(Soviet Union) URS	Vladimir Drobot	27	3	27	3	0	0	0	0
	MF	(Soviet Union) URS	Valeriy Hritsenko	47	5	47	5	0	0	0	0
	MF	(Soviet Union) URS	Valentyn Buhlak	39	2	39	2	0	0	0	0
	MF	(Soviet Union) URS	Serhiy Zelinskyi	4	0	4	0	0	0	0	0
	MF	(Soviet Union) URS	Andriy Kryvenok	47	6	47	6	0	0	0	0
	MF	(Soviet Union) URS	Serhiy Panich	0	0	0	0	0	0	0	0
	MF	(Soviet Union) URS	Valentyn Shuman	25	1	25	1	0	0	0	0
	MF	(Soviet Union) URS	Vitaliy Sokolov	15	0	15	0	0	0	0	0
Forwards
	FW	(Soviet Union) URS	Yuriy Yakovenko	47	12	47	12	0	0	0	0
	FW	(Soviet Union) URS	Vitaliy Arinin	22	2	22	2	0	0	0	0
	FW	(Soviet Union) URS	Igor Chetverik	49	12	49	12	0	0	0	0
	FW	(Soviet Union) URS	Volodymyr Avramenko	2	0	2	0	0	0	0	0
	FW	(Soviet Union) URS	Yuriy Ovcharenko	38	10	38	10	0	0	0	0
	FW	(Soviet Union) URS	Oleksandr Ilyich	24	1	24	1	0	0	0	0

Source: Competitions

Last updated: 1 November 2026

=== Goalscorers ===
Rank	No.	Pos	Nat	Name	Premier League	Cup	Europa League	Total
1		FW	(Soviet Union)	Yuriy Yakovenko	12	0	0	12
1		FW	(Soviet Union)	Igor Chetverik	12	0	0	12
2		FW	(Soviet Union)	Yuriy Ovcharenko	10	0	0	10
3		MF	(Soviet Union)	Andriy Kryvenok	6	0	0	6
4		MF	(Soviet Union)	Valeriy Hritsenko	5	0	0	5
5		MF	(Soviet Union)	Vladimir Drobot	3	0	0	3
6		DF	(Soviet Union)	Serhiy Sapronov	2	0	0	2
6		MF	(Soviet Union)	Valeriy Gusev	2	0	0	2
6		MF	(Soviet Union)	Valentyn Buhlak	2	0	0	2
6		FW	(Soviet Union)	Vitaliy Arinin	2	0	0	2
7		FW	(Soviet Union)	Oleksandr Ilyich	1	0	0	1
7		DF	(Soviet Union)	Andriy Moscalets	1	0	0	1
7		DF	(Soviet Union)	Yuriy Nadtochiy	1	0	0	1
				Total	59	0	0	59

Last updated: 1 November 2026
