= 1992 FC Desna Chernihiv season =

FC Desna Chernihiv
1992 season
- President: Ivan Fedorets
- Manager: Yuriy Hruznov
- Stadium: Chernihiv Stadium
- Ukrainian First League: 5th
- Ukrainian Cup: 1/32 finals
- Top goalscorer: League: Yuriy Ovcharenko (7); All: Yuriy Ovcharenko (7)
- Highest home attendance: 5000 (vs Podillya Khmelnytskyi, 29 May 1992)
- Lowest home attendance: 300 (vs SKA Kyiv, 8 April 1992)
- Biggest win: Desna Chernihiv 2-0 Krystal Chortkiv; Desna Chernihiv 2-0 Halychyna Drohobych; Desna Chernihiv 2-0 SKA Kyiv; Desna Chernihiv 2-0 Chaika Sevastopol
- Biggest defeat: Veres Rivne 4-0 Desna Chernihiv
| Home colours | Away colours |

For the 1992 season, FC Desna Chernihiv competed in the Ukrainian First League for the first time. The club played its matches at the Chernihiv Stadium in Chernihiv.

== Season summary ==
Following the Dissolution of the Soviet Union in 1991 and Ukraine's independence, Desna Chernihiv was transferred from the Football Championship of the Ukrainian SSR to the Ukrainian First League. Yuriy Hruznov has been confirmed as the team's coach, as have most of the players on the roster; with the exceptions of Andriy Moscalets, Valeriy Hritsenko, and Oleksandr Ilyich, who have been released. Meanwhile, Vitaliy Sokolov and Serhiy Zelinskyi have been transferred to Fakel Varva and Torpedo Zaporizhzhia, respectively. At the same time the club signed Igor Pakhar, Yuriy Esaulov and Oleksandr Likhovitskiy from Hydraulic Chernihiv, Neftçi and Zhenis respectively. In the new format of the Ukrainian Cup following Ukraine's independence, the club was eliminated by Vorskla Poltava, losing 1–0 at the Vorskla Stadium in Poltava. At the end of the season in the Ukrainian First League, the club recorded 11 wins, 7 draws, and 8 losses, finishing in 5th place in Group A.

== Players ==
=== Squad information ===
As of 31 October 2026

| Squad no. | Name | Nationality | Position | Date of birth (age) |
Goalkeepers
| | Yuriy Melashenko | (Ukraine) | GK | 21 April 1970 (aged 22) |
| | Yuriy Ovcharov | (Ukraine) | GK | 19 March 1966 (aged 26) |
Defenders
| | Yuriy Nadtochiy | (Ukraine) | DF | 3 July 1967 (aged 25) |
| | Andriy Kryvenok | (Ukraine) | DF | 2 August 1972 (aged 19) |
| | Andriy Bilousov | (Ukraine) | DF | 14 January 1972 (aged 20) |
| | Leonid Bumstein | (Ukraine) | DF | 24 April 1970 (aged 22) |
| | Valeriy Husev | (Ukraine) | DF | 13 February 1970 (aged 22) |
| | Oleksandr Lepekho | (Ukraine) | DF | 25 October 1971 (aged 20) |
| | Oleksandr Lykhobytskiy | (Ukraine) | DF | 12 August 1962 (aged 29) |
| | Ihor Pakhar | (Ukraine) | DF | 5 April 1967 (aged 25) |
| | Valentyn Shuman | (Ukraine) | DF | 17 March 1968 (aged 24) |
| | Yuriy Esaulov | (Ukraine) | DF | 14 January 1962 (aged 30) |
| | Serhiy Sapronov | (Ukraine) | DF | 21 October 1961 (aged 30) |
Midfielders
| | Yuriy Bondarenko | (Ukraine) | MF | 14 January 1972 (aged 20) |
| | Oleksandr Savenchuk | (Ukraine) | MF | 9 March 1975 (aged 17) |
| | Volodymyr Avramenko | (Ukraine) | MF | 22 June 1969 (aged 23) |
| | Vladimir Drobot | (Ukraine) | MF | 22 June 1969 (aged 23) |
Forwards
| | Vitaliy Arinin | (Ukraine) | FW | 25 March 1970 (aged 22) |
| | Igor Chetverik (Captain) | (Ukraine) | FW | 2 June 1965 (aged 27) |
| | Yuriy Yakovenko | (Ukraine) | FW | 19 December 1971 (aged 20) |
| | Volodymyr Avramenko | (Ukraine) | FW | 20 March 1974 (aged 18) |
| | Yuriy Ovcharenko | (Ukraine) | FW | 25 April 1968 (aged 24) |

== Transfers ==
=== In ===
| Date | Pos. | Player | Age | Moving from | Type | Fee | Source |
Summer
| 10 December 1991 | DF | (Soviet Union) Igor Pakhar | 25 | (Soviet Union) Hydraulic Chernihiv | Transfer | Free | |
| 11 December 1991 | DF | (Soviet Union) Yuriy Esaulov | 30 | (Soviet Union) Neftçi | Transfer | Free | |
| 12 December 1991 | MF | (Soviet Union) Oleksandr Likhovitskiy | 29 | (Soviet Union) Zhenis | Transfer | Free | |

=== Out ===
| Date | Pos. | Player | Age | Moving to | Type | Fee | Source |
Summer
| 13 December 1991 | DF | (Soviet Union) Andriy Moscalets | 20 | Unattached | End Contract | | |
| 14 December 1991 | DF | (Soviet Union) Valeriy Hritsenko | 20 | Unattached | Transfer | Free | |
| 8 December 1991 | MF | (Soviet Union) Serhiy Zelinskyi | 20 | (Soviet Union) Torpedo Zaporizhzhia | Transfer | Free | |
| 9 December 1991 | MF | (Soviet Union) Vitaliy Sokolov | 25 | (Soviet Union) Fakel Varva | Transfer | Free | |
| 11 December 1991 | FW | (Soviet Union) Oleksandr Ilyich | 21 | Unattached | Transfer | Free | |

== Competitions ==
=== Overall ===
| Competition | First match | Last match | Starting round | Final position | Record | | | | | | | |
| Competition | First match | Last match | Starting round | Final position | Pld | W | D | L | GF | GA | GD | Win % |
|---|---|---|---|---|---|---|---|---|---|---|---|---|
| First League | 15 August 1993 | 3 July 1994 | Matchday 1 | 5th | 26 | 11 | 7 | 8 | 23 | 24 | −1 | 42.31 |
| Cup | 16 February 1992 | 16 February 1992 | First preliminary round | Round of 32 (1/16) | 1 | 0 | 0 | 1 | 0 | 1 | −1 | 0.00 |
| Total | | | | | 27 | 11 | 7 | 9 | 23 | 25 | −2 | 40.74 |

Last updated: 30 October 2026
Source: Competitions

=== First League ===
==== League table ====
| Pos | Team | Pld | W | D | L | GF | GA | GD | Pts | Promotion or relegation |
|---|---|---|---|---|---|---|---|---|---|---|
| 1 | Veres Rivne (C, P) | 26 | 14 | 8 | 4 | 38 | 15 | +23 | 36 | Promoted to Vyshcha Liha |
| 2 | Pryladyst Mukacheve | 26 | 14 | 5 | 7 | 27 | 15 | +12 | 33 | |
| 3 | Polihraftekhnika Oleksandriya | 26 | 11 | 8 | 7 | 25 | 27 | −2 | 30 | |
| 4 | Podillia Khmelnytsky | 26 | 10 | 10 | 6 | 29 | 21 | +8 | 30 | |
| 5 | Krystal Chortkiv | 26 | 11 | 7 | 8 | 34 | 26 | +8 | 29 | |
| 6 | Desna Chernihiv | 26 | 11 | 7 | 8 | 23 | 24 | −1 | 29 | |
| 7 | Dynamo-2 Kyiv | 26 | 9 | 10 | 7 | 33 | 23 | +10 | 28 | |
| 8 | Avtomobilist Sumy | 26 | 11 | 4 | 11 | 29 | 29 | 0 | 26 | |
| 9 | Stal Alchevsk | 26 | 9 | 8 | 9 | 28 | 22 | +6 | 26 | |
| 10 | Polissia Zhytomyr (R) | 26 | 10 | 5 | 11 | 30 | 31 | −1 | 25 | Relegated to Second League |
| 11 | Halychyna Drohobych (R) | 26 | 9 | 5 | 12 | 25 | 32 | −7 | 23 | Relegated to Second League |
| 12 | Dnipro Cherkasy (R) | 26 | 9 | 4 | 13 | 22 | 27 | −5 | 22 | Relegated to Second League |
| 13 | Chaika Sevastopol (R) | 26 | 7 | 4 | 15 | 19 | 39 | −20 | 18 | Relegated to Second League |
| 14 | SKA Kyiv (R) | 26 | 3 | 3 | 20 | 14 | 45 | −31 | 9 | Relegated to Second League |

(C) Champions; (P) Promoted; (R) Relegated

| Pos | Team | Pld | W | D | L | GF | GA | GD | Pts | Promotion or relegation |
|---|---|---|---|---|---|---|---|---|---|---|
| 1 | Kryvbas Kryvyi Rih (C, P) | 26 | 15 | 10 | 1 | 46 | 23 | +23 | 40 | Promoted to Vyshcha Liha |
| 2 | Metalurh Nikopol | 26 | 15 | 7 | 4 | 45 | 19 | +26 | 37 | |
| 3 | Artania Ochakiv | 26 | 13 | 6 | 7 | 27 | 24 | +3 | 32 | |
| 4 | Ros Bila Tserkva | 26 | 13 | 5 | 8 | 40 | 32 | +8 | 31 | |
| 5 | Zakarpattia Uzhhorod | 26 | 13 | 5 | 8 | 28 | 25 | +3 | 31 | |
| 6 | Skala Stryi | 26 | 11 | 9 | 6 | 39 | 24 | +15 | 31 | |
| 7 | Shakhtar Pavlohrad | 26 | 13 | 4 | 9 | 46 | 33 | +13 | 30 | |
| 8 | Vorskla Poltava | 26 | 12 | 5 | 9 | 33 | 25 | +8 | 29 | |
| 9 | Khimik Severodonetsk | 26 | 10 | 7 | 9 | 28 | 28 | 0 | 27 | |
| 10 | Krystal Kherson (R) | 26 | 10 | 5 | 11 | 36 | 36 | 0 | 25 | Relegated to Second League |
| 11 | Azovets Mariupol (R) | 26 | 10 | 4 | 12 | 36 | 39 | −3 | 24 | Relegated to Second League |
| 12 | Shakhtar-2 Donetsk (R) | 26 | 5 | 2 | 19 | 25 | 48 | −23 | 12 | Relegated to Second League |
| 13 | Vahonobudivnyk Stakhanov (R) | 26 | 4 | 3 | 19 | 16 | 48 | −32 | 11 | Relegated to Second League |
| 14 | Chornomorets-2 Odesa (R) | 26 | 0 | 4 | 22 | 14 | 55 | −41 | 4 | Relegated to Second League |

(C) Champions; (P) Promoted; (R) Relegated

=== Ukrainian First League ===
| 15 March 1992 1 | Chaika Sevastopol | 3–0 | Desna Chernihiv | Sevastopol |
| 19:00 EEST (UTC+03:00) | | Report | | Stadium: Chaika Stadium; Attendance: 1000 |

| 20 March 1992 2 | Stal Alchevsk | 0–0 | Desna Chernihiv | Alchevsk |
| 19:00 EEST (UTC+03:00) | | Report | | Stadium: Stal Stadium (Alchevsk); Attendance: 5000 |

| 28 March 1992 3 | Desna Chernihiv | 2–0 | Krystal Chortkiv | Chernihiv |
| 19:00 EEST (UTC+03:00) | | Report | | Stadium: Chernihiv Stadium; Attendance: 2500 |

| 31 March 1992 4 | Desna Chernihiv | 0–0 | Krystal Chortkiv | Chernihiv |
| 19:00 EEST (UTC+03:00) | | Report | | Stadium: Chernihiv Stadium; Attendance: 3000 |

| 3 April 1992 5 | Desna Chernihiv | 2–0 | Halychyna Drohobych | Chernihiv |
| 19:00 EEST (UTC+03:00) | | Report | | Stadium: Chernihiv Stadium; Attendance: 2000 |

| 8 April 1992 6 | SKA Kyiv | 0–0 | Desna Chernihiv | Kyiv |
| 19:00 EEST (UTC+03:00) | | Report | | Stadium: SKA Stadium; Attendance: 300 |

| 11 April 1992 7 | Dnipro Cherkasy | 0–1 | Desna Chernihiv | Cherkasy |
| 19:00 EEST (UTC+03:00) | | Report | | Stadium: Cherkasy Arena; Attendance: 600 |

| 14 April 1992 8 | Polihraftekhnika Oleksandriya | 0–0 | Desna Chernihiv | Oleksandriya |
| 19:00 EEST (UTC+03:00) | | Report | | Stadium: Shakhtar Stadium; Attendance: 4000 |

| 20 April 1992 9 | Desna Chernihiv | 1–4 | Veres Rivne | Chernihiv |
| 19:00 EEST (UTC+03:00) | | Report | | Stadium: Chernihiv Stadium; Attendance: 2000 |

| 23 April 1992 10 | Desna Chernihiv | 1–0 | Podillia Khmelnytsky | Chernihiv |
| 19:00 EEST (UTC+03:00) | | Report | | Stadium: Chernihiv Stadium; Attendance: 1500 |

| 26 April 1992 11 | Desna Chernihiv | 1–0 | Polissia Zhytomyr | Chernihiv |
| 19:00 EEST (UTC+03:00) | | Report | | Stadium: Chernihiv Stadium; Attendance: 3000 |

| 3 May 1992 12 | Avtomobilist Sumy | 2–1 | Desna Chernihiv | Sumy |
| 19:00 EEST (UTC+03:00) | | Report | | Stadium: Kolos Stadium; Attendance: 1500 |

| 9 May 1992 13 | Desna Chernihiv | 1–0 | Dynamo-2 Kyiv | Chernihiv |
| 19:00 EEST (UTC+03:00) | | Report | | Stadium: Chernihiv Stadium; Attendance: 2000 |

| 14 May 1992 14 | Desna Chernihiv | 2–1 | Avtomobilist Sumy | Chernihiv |
| 19:00 EEST (UTC+03:00) | | Report | | Stadium: Chernihiv Stadium; Attendance: 1500 |

| 20 May 1992 15 | Dynamo-2 Kyiv | 1–1 | Desna Chernihiv | Kyiv |
| 19:00 EEST (UTC+03:00) | | Report | | Stadium: Dynamo Stadium; Attendance: 1500 |

| 26 May 1992 16 | Dynamo-2 Kyiv | 4–0 | Desna Chernihiv | Rivne |
| 19:00 EEST (UTC+03:00) | | Report | | Stadium: Avanhard Stadium; Attendance: 2000 |

| 29 May 1992 17 | Podillia Khmelnytsky | 0–0 | Desna Chernihiv | Khmelnytskyi |
| 19:00 EEST (UTC+03:00) | | Report | | Stadium: Podillya Stadium; Attendance: 5000 |

| 1 June 1992 18 | Polissia Zhytomyr | 1–2 | Desna Chernihiv | Zhytomyr |
| 19:00 EEST (UTC+03:00) | | Report | | Stadium: LKSMU Stadium; Attendance: 2000 |

| 7 June 1992 19 | Desna Chernihiv | 2–0 | SKA Kyiv | Chernihiv |
| 19:00 EEST (UTC+03:00) | | Report | | Stadium: Chernihiv Stadium; Attendance: 2000 |

| 10 June 1992 20 | Desna Chernihiv | 1–0 | Dnipro Cherkasy | Chernihiv |
| 19:00 EEST (UTC+03:00) | | Report | | Stadium: Chernihiv Stadium; Attendance: 1000 |

| 13 June 1992 21 | Desna Chernihiv | 2–2 | Polihraftekhnika Oleksandriya | Chernihiv |
| 19:00 EEST (UTC+03:00) | | Report | | Stadium: Chernihiv Stadium; Attendance: 3000 |

| 18 June 1992 22 | Krystal Chortkiv | 1–0 | Desna Chernihiv | Chortkiv |
| 19:00 EEST (UTC+03:00) | | Report | | Stadium: Kharchovyk Stadium; Attendance: 4000 |

| 21 June 1992 23 | Pryladyst Mukacheve | 1–0 | Desna Chernihiv | Mukachevo |
| 19:00 EEST (UTC+03:00) | | Report | | Stadium: October 50th Anniversary Stadium; Attendance: 3500 |

| 24 June 1992 24 | Halychyna Drohobych | 1–0 | Desna Chernihiv | Drohobych |
| 19:00 EEST (UTC+03:00) | | Report | | Stadium: Kranovyk Stadium; Attendance: 2500 |

| 29 June 1992 25 | Desna Chernihiv | 2–0 | Chaika Sevastopol | Chernihiv |
| 19:00 EEST (UTC+03:00) | | Report | | Stadium: Chernihiv Stadium; Attendance: 2500 |

| 5 July 1992 26 | Desna Chernihiv | 1–3 | Stal Alchevsk | Chernihiv |
| 19:00 EEST (UTC+03:00) | | Report | | Stadium: Chernihiv Stadium; Attendance: 1500 |

=== Ukrainian Cup ===
| 16 February 1992 Round of 64 (1/32) | Vorskla Poltava | 1–0 | Desna Chernihiv | Poltava |
| EEST (UTC+3) | Lukash 75' (pen.) | Report | | Stadium: Vorskla Stadium; Attendance: 6000; Referee: Vadym Shevchenko (Kyiv) |

== Statistics ==
=== Appearances and goals ===
| No. | Pos | Nat | Player | Total | | Ukrainian First League | | Ukrainian Cup | | Play-offs | |
| No. | Pos | Nat | Player | Apps | Goals | Apps | Goals | Apps | Goals | Apps | Goals |
Goalkeepers
| | GK | (Ukraine) UKR | Yuriy Melashenko | 24 | 0 | 23 | 0 | 1 | 0 | 0 | 0 |
| | GK | (Ukraine) UKR | Yuriy Ovcharov | 4 | 0 | 4 | 0 | 0 | 0 | 0 | 0 |
Defenders
| | DF | (Ukraine) UKR | Igor Pakhar | 27 | 0 | 26 | 0 | 1 | 0 | 0 | 0 |
| | DF | (Ukraine) UKR | Yuriy Esaulov | 22 | 0 | 21 | 0 | 1 | 0 | 0 | 0 |
| | DF | (Ukraine) UKR | Yuriy Nadtochiy | 26 | 0 | 25 | 0 | 1 | 0 | 0 | 0 |
| | DF | (Ukraine) UKR | Andriy Kryvenok | 23 | 3 | 22 | 3 | 1 | 0 | 0 | 0 |
| | DF | (Ukraine) UKR | Andriy Bilousov | 2 | 0 | 2 | 0 | 0 | 0 | 0 | 0 |
| | DF | (Ukraine) UKR | Serhiy Sapronov | 5 | 0 | 5 | 0 | 0 | 0 | 0 | 0 |
Midfielders
| | MF | (Ukraine) UKR | Yuriy Bondarenko | 18 | 1 | 17 | 1 | 1 | 0 | 0 | 0 |
| | MF | (Ukraine) UKR | Oleksandr Likhovitskiy | 24 | 1 | 24 | 1 | 0 | 0 | 0 | 0 |
| | MF | (Ukraine) UKR | Valeriy Gusev | 25 | 1 | 25 | 1 | 0 | 0 | 0 | 0 |
| | MF | (Ukraine) UKR | Vladimir Drobot | 24 | 1 | 23 | 1 | 1 | 0 | 0 | 0 |
| | MF | (Ukraine) UKR | Valentyn Buhlak | 20 | 1 | 20 | 1 | 0 | 0 | 0 | 0 |
Forwards
| | FW | (Ukraine) UKR | Yuriy Yakovenko | 24 | 4 | 24 | 4 | 0 | 0 | 0 | 0 |
| | FW | (Ukraine) UKR | Vitaliy Arinin | 24 | 4 | 24 | 4 | 0 | 0 | 0 | 0 |
| | FW | (Ukraine) UKR | Igor Chetverik | 24 | 2 | 23 | 2 | 1 | 0 | 0 | 0 |
| | FW | (Ukraine) UKR | Volodymyr Avramenko | 18 | 2 | 17 | 2 | 1 | 0 | 0 | 0 |
| | FW | (Ukraine) UKR | Yuriy Ovcharenko | 26 | 7 | 25 | 7 | 1 | 0 | 0 | 0 |
| | FW | (Ukraine) UKR | Yuriy Yakovenko | 25 | 4 | 24 | 4 | 1 | 0 | 0 | 0 |

Source: Competitions

Last updated: 31 October 2026

=== Goalscorers ===
| Rank | No. | Pos | Nat | Name | Ukrainian First League | Ukrainian Cup | Play Offs | Total |
|---|---|---|---|---|---|---|---|---|
| 1 | | FW | (Ukraine) | Yuriy Ovcharenko | 7 | 0 | 0 | 7 |
| 2 | | FW | (Ukraine) | Yuriy Yakovenko | 4 | 0 | 0 | 4 |
| 3 | | FW | (Ukraine) | Vitaliy Arinin | 4 | 0 | 0 | 4 |
| 4 | | DF | (Ukraine) | Andriy Kryvenok | 3 | 0 | 0 | 3 |
| 5 | | FW | (Ukraine) | Igor Chetverik | 2 | 0 | 0 | 2 |
| 6 | | FW | (Ukraine) | Volodymyr Avramenko | 2 | 0 | 0 | 2 |
| 7 | | MF | (Ukraine) | Yuriy Bondarenko | 1 | 0 | 0 | 1 |
| 8 | | MF | (Ukraine) | Oleksandr Likhovitskiy | 1 | 0 | 0 | 1 |
| 9 | | MF | (Ukraine) | Valeriy Gusev | 1 | 0 | 0 | 1 |
| 10 | | MF | (Ukraine) | Valentyn Buhlak | 1 | 0 | 0 | 1 |
| 11 | | MF | (Ukraine) | Vladimir Drobot | 1 | 0 | 0 | 1 |
| | | | | Total | 27 | 0 | 0 | 27 |

Last updated: 30 October 2026

=== Clean sheets ===
| Rank | No. | Pos | Nat | Name | Ukrainian First League | Ukrainian Cup | Play-offs | Total |
|---|---|---|---|---|---|---|---|---|
| 1 | 12 | GK | (Ukraine) | Yuriy Melashenko | 14 | 0 | 0 | 14 |
| 2 | 1 | GK | (Ukraine) | Yuriy Ovcharov | 1 | 0 | 0 | 1 |
| | | | | Total | 15 | 0 | 0 | 15 |

Last updated: 31 October 2026

=== Disciplinary record ===
| No. | Pos | Nat | Player | First League | | | Ukrainian Cup | | | Play-offs | | | Total | | |
| No. | Pos | Nat | Player | Yellow card | (yellow card) (yellow-red card) | Red card | Yellow card | (yellow card) (yellow-red card) | Red card | Yellow card | (yellow card) (yellow-red card) | Red card | Yellow card | (yellow card) (yellow-red card) | Red card |
| | FW | (Ukraine) | Igor Chetverik | 4 | 0 | 0 | 0 | 0 | 0 | 0 | 0 | 0 | 4 | 0 | 0 |
| | FW | (Ukraine) | Yuriy Ovcharenko | 1 | 0 | 0 | 0 | 0 | 0 | 0 | 0 | 0 | 1 | 0 | 0 |
| | GK | (Ukraine) | Yuriy Melashenko | 1 | 0 | 0 | 0 | 0 | 0 | 0 | 0 | 0 | 1 | 0 | 0 |
| | DF | (Ukraine) | Igor Pakhar | 1 | 0 | 0 | 0 | 0 | 0 | 0 | 0 | 0 | 1 | 0 | 0 |
| | MF | (Ukraine) | Oleksandr Likhovitskiy | 1 | 0 | 0 | 0 | 0 | 0 | 0 | 0 | 0 | 1 | 0 | 0 |
| | DF | (Ukraine) | Yuriy Esaulov | 0 | 0 | 0 | 1 | 0 | 0 | 0 | 0 | 0 | 1 | 0 | 0 |
| | | | Total | 8 | 0 | 0 | 1 | 0 | 0 | 0 | 0 | 0 | 9 | 0 | 0 |

Last updated: 31 October 2026
