= 1992–93 FC Desna Chernihiv season =

FC Desna Chernihiv
1992–93 season
- Manager: Yuriy Hruznov
- Stadium: Chernihiv Stadium; Yunist Stadium; Kotsiubynske Stadium
- Ukrainian First League: 19th
- Ukrainian Cup: 1/16 finals
- Top goalscorer: League: Yuriy Ovcharenko (11); All: Yuriy Ovcharenko (11)
- Highest home attendance: 10000 (vs Evis Stadium, 5 June 1993)
- Lowest home attendance: 100 (vs Avtomobilist Sumy, 14 November 1992)
- Biggest win: Desna Chernihiv 4-1 Kosmos Pavlohrad
- Biggest defeat: Polihraftekhnika Oleksandria 5-0 Desna Chernihiv
Home colours	Away colours

For the 1992–93 season, FC Desna Chernihiv competed in the Ukrainian First League. Desna Chernihiv participated also in this season's editions of the Ukrainian Cup. The club played most of its matches at the Chernihiv Stadium, with some games also taking place at the Yunist Stadium and the Kotsiubynske Stadium at the Kotsiubynske Village in Mykhailo-Kotsiubynske.

== Season summary ==
As coach was confirmed Yuriy Hruznov, who had led the team to fifth place in the previews seson. Desna Chernihiv signed some players such as Leonid Bumshteyn, Oleksiy Yanchyk and Oleksandr Lepekho. At the same time Serhiy Sapronov and Valentyn Buhlak left the club. On 1 August 1992, the club was eliminated by Dynamo-3 Kyiv at the First preliminary round of the 1992–93 Ukrainian Cup at the CSK ZSU Stadium in Kyiv. During the winter transfer window, the club acquired Yuriy Esaulov from Tekstylschyk Chernihiv, while forwards Yuriy Ovcharenko, Oleksandr Prykhodko and Vitaliy Arinin moved to Nyva Vinnytsia and Tekstylschyk Chernihiv, respectively. The club finished the Ukrainian First League season in 19th place, avoiding relegation.

== Players ==
=== Squad information ===
As of 30 October 2026

Squad no.	Name	Nationality	Position	Date of birth (age)
Goalkeepers
	Yuriy Melashenko	(Ukraine)	GK	21 April 1970 (aged 22)
	Yuriy Ovcharov	(Ukraine)	GK	19 March 1966 (aged 26)
	Oleksandr Prykhodko	(Ukraine)	GK	6 February 1971 (aged 21)
Defenders
	Yuriy Nadtochiy	(Ukraine)	DF	3 July 1967 (aged 25)
	Andriy Kryvenok	(Ukraine)	DF	2 August 1972 (aged 19)
	Andriy Bilousov	(Ukraine)	DF	14 January 1972 (aged 20)
	Leonid Bumstein	(Ukraine)	DF	24 April 1970 (aged 22)
	Valeriy Husev	(Ukraine)	DF	13 February 1970 (aged 22)
	Oleksandr Lepekho	(Ukraine)	DF	25 October 1971 (aged 20)
	Oleksandr Lykhobytskiy	(Ukraine)	DF	12 August 1962 (aged 29)
	Ihor Pakhar	(Ukraine)	DF	5 April 1967 (aged 25)
	Valentyn Shuman	(Ukraine)	DF	17 March 1968 (aged 24)
	Yuriy Esaulov	(Ukraine)	DF	14 January 1962 (aged 30)
	Oleksiy Yanchyk	(Ukraine)	DF	10 March 1975 (aged 17)
Midfielders
	Yuriy Bondarenko	(Ukraine)	MF	14 January 1972 (aged 20)
	Oleksandr Savenchuk	(Ukraine)	MF	9 March 1975 (aged 17)
	Volodymyr Avramenko	(Ukraine)	MF	22 June 1969 (aged 23)
	Vladimir Drobot	(Ukraine)	MF	22 June 1969 (aged 23)
	Oleksandr Prikhodko	(Ukraine)	MF	22 June 1969 (aged 23)
	Nykola Fedorko	(Ukraine)	MF	3 February 1970 (aged 22)
	Oleksandr Kaminskyi	(Ukraine)	MF	3 August 1970 (aged 21)
Forwards
	Vitaliy Arinin	(Ukraine)	FW	25 March 1970 (aged 22)
	Igor Chetverik (Captain)	(Ukraine)	FW	2 June 1965 (aged 27)
	Yuriy Yakovenko	(Ukraine)	FW	19 December 1971 (aged 20)
	Volodymyr Avramenko	(Ukraine)	FW	20 March 1974 (aged 18)
	Yuriy Ovcharenko	(Ukraine)	FW	25 April 1968 (aged 24)

== Transfers ==
=== In ===
Date	Pos.	Player	Age	Moving from	Type	Fee	Source
Summer
9 June 1992	GK	(Ukraine) Oleksandr Prykhodko	20	Unattached	Transfer	Free	
10 June 1992	DF	(Ukraine) Leonid Bumshteyn	23	Unattached	Transfer	Free	
11 June 1992	DF	(Ukraine) Oleksiy Yanchyk	23	Unattached	Transfer	Free	
12 June 1992	DF	(Ukraine) Oleksandr Lepekho	23	Unattached	Transfer	Free	
Winter
9 January 1993	DF	(Ukraine) Yuriy Esaulov	23	(Ukraine) Tekstylschyk Chernihiv	Transfer	Free	

=== Out ===
Date	Pos.	Player	Age	Moving to	Type	Fee	Source
Summer
16 June 1992	DF	(Ukraine) Serhiy Sapronov	23	(Ukraine) Nyva Vinnytsia	Transfer	Free	
18 June 1992	MF	(Ukraine) Valentyn Buhlak	23	(Ukraine) Tekstylschyk Chernihiv	Transfer	Free	
Winter
7 January 1993	GK	(Ukraine) Oleksandr Prykhodko	20	(Ukraine) Tekstylschyk Chernihiv	Transfer	Free	
8 January 1993	FW	(Ukraine) Vitaliy Arinin	20	(Ukraine) Tekstylschyk Chernihiv	Transfer	Free	
9 January 1993	FW	(Ukraine) Yuriy Ovcharenko	21	(Ukraine) Nyva Vinnytsia	Transfer	Free	

== Competitions ==
=== Overall ===
Competition	First match	Last match	Starting round	Final position	Record							
Competition	First match	Last match	Starting round	Final position	Pld	W	D	L	GF	GA	GD	Win %
First League	11 August 1992		Matchday 1	19th	42	13	9	20	42	49	−7	30.95
Ukrainian Cup	1 August 1992	1 August 1992	First preliminary round	First preliminary round	1	0	0	1	0	2	−2	0.00
Total					43	13	9	21	42	51	−9	30.23

Last updated: 15 October 2026
Source: Competitions

=== First League ===
==== League table ====
Pos	Team	Pld	W	D	L	GF	GA	GD	Pts	Promotion or relegation
17	Avtomobilist Sumy	42	13	10	19	39	61	−22	36	
18	Artania Ochakiv	42	15	5	22	42	73	−31	35	
19	Desna Chernihiv	42	13	9	20	42	49	−7	35	
20	Pryladyst Mukacheve	42	12	11	19	38	53	−15	35	
21	Ros Bila Tserkva (R)	42	10	15	17	40	48	−8	35	Relegated to Second League

Source: uafootball.net.ua
(R) Relegated

=== Ukrainian First League ===
11 August 1992 1	Nyva Vinnytsia	1–0	Desna Chernihiv	Vinnytsia
19:00 EEST (UTC+03:00)		Report		Stadium: Lokomotyv Stadium; Attendance: 5500

14 August 1992 2	Podillya Khmelnytskyi	1–1	Desna Chernihiv	Khmelnytskyi
19:00 EEST (UTC+03:00)		Report		Stadium: SC Podillya; Attendance: 3000

20 August 1992 3	Desna Chernihiv	1–1	Ros Bila Tserkva	Chernihiv
19:00 EEST (UTC+03:00)		Report		Stadium: Chernihiv Stadium; Attendance: 2000

23 August 1992 4	Desna Chernihiv	2–2	Dynamo-2 Kyiv	Chernihiv
19:00 EEST (UTC+03:00)		Report		Stadium: Chernihiv Stadium; Attendance: 1500

7 September 2026 5	Prykarpattia Ivano-Frankivsk	2–0	Desna Chernihiv	Ivano-Frankivsk
19:00 EEST (UTC+03:00)		Report		Stadium: Elektron Stadium; Attendance: 3000

10 September 2026 6	FC Pryladyst Mukacheve	0–0	Desna Chernihiv	Mukachevo
19:00 EEST (UTC+03:00)		Report		Stadium: Pryladyst Stadium; Attendance: 2600

15 September 2026 7	Desna Chernihiv	1–0	FC Evis Mykolaiv	Chernihiv
19:00 EEST (UTC+03:00)		Report		Stadium: Yunist Stadium; Attendance: 2000

18 September 2026 8	Desna Chernihiv	0–0	Metalurh Nikopol	Chernihiv
19:00 EEST (UTC+03:00)		Report		Stadium: Yunist Stadium; Attendance: 1000

23 September 1992 9	SC Odesa	3–1	Desna Chernihiv	Odessa
19:00 EEST (UTC+03:00)		Report		Stadium: SKA Stadium; Attendance: 2500

26 September 1992 10	Artania Ochakiv	0–1	Desna Chernihiv	Ochakiv
19:00 EEST (UTC+03:00)		Report		Stadium: Artania Stadium; Attendance: 1500

30 September 1992 11	Desna Chernihiv	1–2	Temp Shepetivka	Chernihiv
19:00 EEST (UTC+03:00)		Report		Stadium: Chernihiv Stadium; Attendance: 2200

3 October 1992 12	Desna Chernihiv	3–0	Krystal Chortkiv	Chernihiv
19:00 EEST (UTC+03:00)		Report		Stadium: Chernihiv Stadium; Attendance: 2200

10 October 1992 13	Shakhtar Pavlohrad	2–1	Desna Chernihiv	Donetsk
19:00 EEST (UTC+03:00)		Report		Stadium: Shakhtar Stadium; Attendance: 1200

13 October 1992 14	Polihraftekhnika Oleksandria	5–0	Desna Chernihiv	Oleksandria
19:00 EEST (UTC+03:00)		Report		Stadium: Olimp Stadium; Attendance: 2000

20 October 1992 15	Desna Chernihiv	1–0	Stal Alchevsk	Chernihiv
19:00 EEST (UTC+03:00)		Report		Stadium: Chernihiv Stadium; Attendance: 600

23 October 1992 16	Desna Chernihiv	2–0	Khimik Severodonetsk	Chernihiv
19:00 EEST (UTC+03:00)		Report		Stadium: Chernihiv Stadium; Attendance: 1000

28 October 1992 17	Naftovyk Okhtyrka	1–0	Desna Chernihiv	Trostianets
19:00 EEST (UTC+03:00)		Report		Stadium: Kuts Stadium; Attendance: 1000

31 October 1992 18	Vorskla Poltava	1–0	Desna Chernihiv	Poltava
19:00 EEST (UTC+03:00)		Report		Stadium: Vorskla Stadium; Attendance: 2500

6 November 1992 19	Desna Chernihiv	3–0	Zakarpattia Uzhhorod	Chernihiv
19:00 EEST (UTC+03:00)		Report		Stadium: Chernihiv Stadium; Attendance: 1000

9 November 1992 20	Desna Chernihiv	0–0	FC Skala Stryi	Chernihiv
19:00 EEST (UTC+03:00)		Report		Stadium: Chernihiv Stadium; Attendance: 1000

14 November 1992 21	Desna Chernihiv	3–2	Avtomobilist Sumy	Mykhailo-Kotsiubynske
19:00 EEST (UTC+03:00)		Report		Stadium: Kotsiubynske Stadium; Attendance: 100

30 March 1993 22	Avtomobilist Sumy	1–0	Desna Chernihiv	Sumy
19:00 EEST (UTC+03:00)		Report		Stadium: Kolos Stadium; Attendance: 2000

4 April 1993 23	FC Skala Stryi	1–1	Desna Chernihiv	Stryi
19:00 EEST (UTC+03:00)		Report		Stadium: Sokil Stadium; Attendance: 8000

7 April 1993 24	Zakarpattia Uzhhorod	1–0	Desna Chernihiv	Uzhhorod
19:00 EEST (UTC+03:00)		Report		Stadium: Avanhard Stadium; Attendance: 2500

14 April 1993 25	Desna Chernihiv	3–1	Vorskla Poltava	Chernihiv
19:00 EEST (UTC+03:00)		Report		Stadium: Chernihiv Stadium; Attendance: 3000

17 April 1993 26	Desna Chernihiv	0–1	Naftovyk Okhtyrka	Chernihiv
19:00 EEST (UTC+03:00)		Report		Stadium: Chernihiv Stadium; Attendance: 3000

25 April 1993 27	Khimik Severodonetsk	2–0	Desna Chernihiv	Sievierodonetsk
19:00 EEST (UTC+03:00)		Report		Stadium: Khimik Stadium; Attendance: 7000

25 April 1993 28	Stal Alchevsk	1–0	Desna Chernihiv	Alchevsk
19:00 EEST (UTC+03:00)		Report		Stadium: Stal Stadium; Attendance: 5000

5 May 1993 29	Desna Chernihiv	0–1	Polihraftekhnika Oleksandria	Chernihiv
19:00 EEST (UTC+03:00)		Report		Stadium: Chernihiv Stadium; Attendance: 3000

8 May 1993 30	Desna Chernihiv	4–1	Shakhtar Pavlohrad	Chernihiv
19:00 EEST (UTC+03:00)		Report		Stadium: Chernihiv Stadium; Attendance: 3000

14 May 1993 31	Krystal Chortkiv	1–0	Desna Chernihiv	Chortkiv
19:00 EEST (UTC+03:00)		Report		Stadium: Kharchovyk Stadium; Attendance: 2000

17 May 1993 32	Temp Shepetivka	3–1	Desna Chernihiv	Shepetivka
19:00 EEST (UTC+03:00)		Report		Stadium: Temp Stadium; Attendance: 6200

24 May 1993 33	Desna Chernihiv	1–0	Artania Ochakiv	Chernihiv
19:00 EEST (UTC+03:00)		Report		Stadium: Chernihiv Stadium; Attendance: 3000

24 May 1993 34	Desna Chernihiv	1–0	SC Odesa	Chernihiv
19:00 EEST (UTC+03:00)		Report		Stadium: Chernihiv Stadium; Attendance: 3000

2 June 1993 35	Metalurh Nikopol	2–1	Desna Chernihiv	Nikopol
19:00 EEST (UTC+03:00)		Report		Stadium: Elektrometalurh Stadium; Attendance: 2000

5 June 1993 36	Evis Mykolaiv	4–3	Desna Chernihiv	Mykolaiv
19:00 EEST (UTC+03:00)		Report		Stadium: Evis Stadium; Attendance: 10000

12 June 1993 37	Desna Chernihiv	3–1	Pryladyst Mukacheve	Chernihiv
19:00 EEST (UTC+03:00)		Report		Stadium: Chernihiv Stadium; Attendance: 2500

15 June 1993 38	Desna Chernihiv	0–0	Prykarpattia Ivano-Frankivsk	Chernihiv
19:00 EEST (UTC+03:00)		Report		Stadium: Chernihiv Stadium; Attendance: 2000

5 June 1993 39	Dynamo-2 Kyiv	1–1	Desna Chernihiv	Kiev
19:00 EEST (UTC+03:00)		Report		Stadium: Dynamo Stadium; Attendance: 2000

24 June 1993 40	FC Ros Bila Tserkva	1–0	Desna Chernihiv	Bila Tserkva
19:00 EEST (UTC+03:00)		Report		Stadium: Trudovi Rezervy Stadium; Attendance: 1500

30 June 1993 41	Desna Chernihiv	2–1	Nord-Am Podillya Khmelnytskyi	Chernihiv
19:00 EEST (UTC+03:00)		Report		Stadium: Chernihiv Stadium; Attendance: 3000

3 July 1993 42	Desna Chernihiv	0–2	Nyva Vinnytsia	Chernihiv
19:00 EEST (UTC+03:00)		Report		Stadium: Chernihiv Stadium; Attendance: 1500

=== Ukrainian Cup ===
1 August 1992 Round of 64 (1/32)	Dynamo-3 Kyiv	2–0	Desna Chernihiv	Kyiv
EEST (UTC+3)	Venglynskyi 60'; Nesterchuk 73'	Report		Stadium: CSK ZSU Stadium; Referee: 200

== Statistics ==
=== Appearances and goals ===
No.	Pos	Nat	Player	Total		Ukrainian First League		Ukrainian Cup		Play-offs	
No.	Pos	Nat	Player	Apps	Goals	Apps	Goals	Apps	Goals	Apps	Goals
Goalkeepers
	GK	(Ukraine) UKR	Yuriy Melashenko	15	0	14	0	1	0	0	0
	GK	(Ukraine) UKR	Yuriy Ovcharov	28	0	28	0	0	0	0	0
Defenders
	DF	(Ukraine) UKR	Yuriy Nadtochiy	41	1	40	1	1	0	0	0
	DF	(Ukraine) UKR	Andriy Kryvenok	41	1	40	1	1	0	0	0
	DF	(Ukraine) UKR	Andriy Bilousov	22	1	21	1	1	0	0	0
	DF	(Ukraine) UKR	Leonid Bumshteyn	10	0	10	0	0	0	0	0
	DF	(Ukraine) UKR	Valeriy Husev	5	0	4	0	1	0	0	0
	DF	(Ukraine) UKR	Oleksandr Lepekho	27	0	27	0	0	0	0	0
	DF	(Ukraine) UKR	Oleksandr Lykhobytskiy	19	2	18	2	1	0	0	0
	DF	(Ukraine) UKR	Ihor Pakhar	40	0	39	0	1	0	0	0
	DF	(Ukraine) UKR	Valentyn Shuman	12	0	12	0	0	0	0	0
	DF	(Ukraine) UKR	Yuriy Esaulov	3	0	2	0	1	0	0	0
	DF	(Ukraine) UKR	Oleksiy Yanchyk	2	0	2	0	0	0	0	0
Midfielders
	MF	(Ukraine) UKR	Yuriy Bondarenko	30	1	29	1	1	0	0	0
	MF	(Ukraine) UKR	Oleksandr Savenchuk	19	4	19	4	0	0	0	0
	MF	(Ukraine) UKR	Volodymyr Avramenko	34	2	34	2	0	0	0	0
	MF	(Ukraine) UKR	Volodymyr Drobot	33	2	32	2	1	0	0	0
	MF	(Ukraine) UKR	Oleksandr Prikhodko	1	0	1	0	0	0	0	0
	MF	(Ukraine) UKR	Igor Simchuk	33	1	33	1	0	0	0	0
	MF	(Ukraine) UKR	Nikolay Fedorko	14	2	14	2	0	0	0	0
	MF	(Ukraine) UKR	Oleksandr Kaminsky	1	0	1	0	0	0	0	0
Forwards
	FW	(Ukraine) UKR	Igor Chetverik	43	6	42	6	1	0	0	0
	FW	(Ukraine) UKR	Yuriy Yakovenko	42	5	42	5	0	0	0	0
	FW	(Ukraine) UKR	Volodymyr Avramenko	35	2	34	2	1	0	0	0
Players transferred out during the season
	GK	(Ukraine) UKR	Oleksandr Prykhodko	1	0	1	0	0	0	0	0
	FW	(Ukraine) UKR	Vitaliy Arinin	3	0	2	0	1	0	0	0
	FW	(Ukraine) UKR	Yuriy Ovcharenko	21	11	21	11	0	0	0	0

Source: Competitions

Last updated: 16 October 2026

=== Goalscorers ===
Rank	No.	Pos	Nat	Name	Ukrainian First League	Ukrainian Cup	Play Offs	Total
1		FW	(Ukraine)	Yuriy Ovcharenko	11	0	0	11
2		FW	(Ukraine)	Igor Chetverik	6	0	0	6
3		FW	(Ukraine)	Yuriy Yakovenko	5	0	0	5
4		MF	(Ukraine)	Oleksandr Savenchuk	4	0	0	4
5		FW	(Ukraine)	Volodymyr Avramenko	2	0	0	2
5		MF	(Ukraine)	Yuriy Yakovenko	2	0	0	2
5		DF	(Ukraine)	Oleksandr Lykhobytskiy	2	0	0	2
5		MF	(Ukraine)	Nikolay Fedorko	2	0	0	2
6		MF	(Ukraine)	Yuriy Bondarenko	1	0	0	1
6		MF	(Ukraine)	Igor Simchuk	1	0	0	1
6		DF	(Ukraine)	Andriy Bilousov	1	0	0	1
6		DF	(Ukraine)	Andriy Kryvenok	1	0	0	1
6		MF	(Ukraine)	Yuriy Nadtochiy	1	0	0	1
				Total	39	0	0	39

Last updated: 15 October 2026

=== Clean sheets ===
Rank	No.	Pos	Nat	Name	Ukrainian First League	Ukrainian Cup	Play-offs	Total
1	1	GK	(Ukraine)	Yuriy Ovcharov	6	0	0	6
2	12	GK	(Ukraine)	Yuriy Melashenko	5	0	0	5
				Total	11	0	0	11

Last updated: 31 October 2026

=== Disciplinary record ===
No.	Pos	Nat	Player	First League			Ukrainian Cup			Play-offs			Total		
No.	Pos	Nat	Player	Yellow card	(yellow card) (yellow-red card)	Red card	Yellow card	(yellow card) (yellow-red card)	Red card	Yellow card	(yellow card) (yellow-red card)	Red card	Yellow card	(yellow card) (yellow-red card)	Red card
	DF	(Ukraine)	Andriy Kryvenok	2	0	0	1	0	0	0	0	0	3	0	0
	MF	(Ukraine)	Igor Simchuk	2	0	0	0	0	0	0	0	0	2	0	0
	DF	(Ukraine)	Oleksandr Lykhobytskiy	2	0	0	0	0	0	0	0	0	2	0	0
	DF	(Ukraine)	Oleksandr Lepekho	2	0	0	0	0	0	0	0	0	2	0	0
	MF	(Ukraine)	Oleksandr Kaminsky	2	0	0	0	0	0	0	0	0	2	0	0
	DF	(Ukraine)	Ihor Pakhar	2	0	0	0	0	0	0	0	0	2	0	0
	MF	(Ukraine)	Volodymyr Drobot	2	0	0	0	0	0	0	0	0	2	0	0
	DF	(Ukraine)	Valentyn Shuman	2	0	0	0	0	0	0	0	0	2	0	0
	DF	(Ukraine)	Yuriy Nadtochiy	2	0	0	0	0	0	0	0	0	2	0	0
	MF	(Ukraine)	Yuriy Bondarenko	1	0	0	0	0	0	0	0	0	1	0	0
	FW	(Ukraine)	Igor Chetverik	1	0	0	0	0	0	0	0	0	1	0	0
	FW	(Ukraine)	Yuriy Ovcharenko	1	0	0	0	0	0	0	0	0	1	0	0
	DF	(Ukraine)	Andriy Bilousov	1	0	0	0	0	0	0	0	0	1	0	0
	FW	(Ukraine)	Volodymyr Avramenko	1	0	0	0	0	0	0	0	0	1	0	0
	FW	(Ukraine)	Yuriy Yakovenko	1	0	0	0	0	0	0	0	0	1	0	0
	DF	(Ukraine)	Valeriy Husev	0	0	0	1	0	0	0	0	0	1	0	0
			Total	24	0	0	2	0	0	0	0	0	26	0	0

Last updated: 16 October 2026
