= 1998–99 FC Desna Chernihiv season =

FC Desna Chernihiv
1999–00 season
- President: Volodymyr Khomenko
- Manager: Yukhym Shkolnykov
- Stadium: Chernihiv Stadium
- Ukrainian First League: 19th
- Ukrainian Cup: Round of 64 (1/32)
- Top goalscorer: League: Vladimir Martynov (5); All: Vladimir Martynov (5)
Home colours	Away colours

For the 1998–99 season, FC Desna Chernihiv competed in the Ukrainian First League.

== Players ==
=== Squad information ===
As of 19 July 2020

Squad no.	Name	Nationality	Position	Date of birth (age)
Goalkeepers
35	Maksym Tatarenko ^{List B}	(Ukraine)	GK	7 May 1999 (aged 21)
44	Yevhen Past	(Ukraine)	GK	16 March 1988 (aged 32)
72	Ihor Lytovka	(Ukraine)	GK	5 June 1988 (aged 32)
Defenders
4	Joonas Tamm	(Estonia)	DF	2 February 1992 (aged 28)
5	Vitaliy Yermakov	(Ukraine)	DF	7 June 1992 (aged 28)
17	Andriy Hitchenko	(Ukraine)	DF	2 October 1984 (aged 35)
22	Andriy Mostovyi	(Ukraine)	DF	24 January 1988 (aged 32)
26	Yukhym Konoplya ^{List B} (on loan from Shakhtar Donetsk)	(Ukraine)	DF	26 August 1999 (aged 20)
32	Maksym Imerekov	(Ukraine)	DF	23 January 1991 (aged 29)
43	Artur Zapadnya	(Ukraine)	DF	4 June 1990 (aged 30)
45	Denys Favorov (Captain)	(Ukraine)	DF	1 April 1991 (aged 29)
Midfielders
7	Vladyslav Ohirya	(Ukraine)	MF	3 April 1990 (aged 30)
8	Andriy Dombrovskyi	(Ukraine)	MF	12 August 1995 (aged 24)
9	Levan Arveladze	(Ukraine) (Georgia (country))	MF	6 April 1993 (aged 27)
11	Vladyslav Kalitvintsev	(Ukraine)	MF	4 January 1993 (aged 27)
12	Yehor Kartushov	(Ukraine)	MF	5 January 1991 (aged 29)
14	Andriy Yakymiv ^{List B}	(Ukraine)	MF	15 June 1997 (aged 23)
16	Yevheniy Belych ^{List B}	(Ukraine)	MF	9 January 2001 (aged 19)
20	Andriy Totovytskyi	(Ukraine)	MF	20 January 1993 (aged 27)
25	Oleksiy Hutsulyak	(Ukraine)	MF	25 December 1997 (aged 22)
27	Serhiy Starenkyi	(Ukraine)	MF	20 September 1984 (aged 35)
77	Orest Kuzyk	(Ukraine)	MF	17 May 1995 (aged 25)
Forwards
10	Oleksandr Filippov	(Ukraine)	FW	23 October 1992 (aged 27)
13	Dmytro Khlyobas	(Ukraine)	FW	9 May 1994 (aged 26)
28	Pylyp Budkivskyi	(Ukraine)	FW	10 March 1992 (aged 28)

== Transfers ==
=== In ===
Date	Pos.	Player	Age	Moving from	Type	Fee	Source
Summer
15 June 1998	GK	(Ukraine) Viktor Litvin	20	(Ukraine) Slavutych-CHAÉS	Loan Return	Free	
15 June 1998	DF	(Ukraine) Oleh Sobekh	20	(Ukraine) Slavutych	Loan Return	Free	
15 June 1998	DF	(Ukraine) Oleksandr Selivanov	20	(Ukraine) Cheksyl Chernihiv	Transfer	Free	
15 June 1998	MF	(Ukraine) Andriy Vitoshynskyi	20	Unattached	Transfer	Free	
15 June 1998	MF	(Ukraine) Vadim Danilevskiy	20	(Ukraine) Slavutich-ChNPP	Transfer	Free	
15 June 1998	MF	(Ukraine) Volodymyr Matsuta	20	(Ukraine) Domostroitel Chernihiv	Transfer	Free	
15 June 1998	FW	(Ukraine) Volodymyr Vanin	20	(Kazakhstan) Taraz	Transfer	Free	
15 June 1998	FW	(Ukraine) Volodymyr Avramenko	20	(Ukraine) Slavutych Chernobyl	Transfer	Free	
15 June 1998	FW	(Ukraine) Oleksandr Kozhemyachenko	20	(Ukraine) Avangard Korukivka	Transfer	Free	
15 June 1998	FW	(Georgia (country)) Gocha Gogokhia	20	(Ukraine) Domostroitel Chernihiv	Transfer	Free	
15 January 1998	FW	(Ukraine) Peter Pilipeyko	20	(Ukraine) Slavutych	Transfer	Free	
Winter
15 January 1999	GK	(Ukraine) Ihor Krapyvkin	20	(Ukraine) Mykolaiv	Transfer	Free	
15 January 1999	DF	(Ukraine) Bohdan Husak	20	(Ukraine) Kremin Kremenchuk	Transfer	Free	
15 January 1999	MF	(Ukraine) Zinoviy Vasyliv	20	(Ukraine) Vinnytsia	Transfer	Free	
15 January 1999	MF	(Ukraine) Volodymyr Holovaty	20	(Ukraine) Kremin Kremenchuk	Transfer	Free	
15 January 1999	MF	(Ukraine) Ruslan Hilazyev	20	(Moldova) Zimbru Chișinău	Transfer	Free	
15 January 1999	MF	(Ukraine) Oleksandr Savenchuk	20	(Ukraine) FC Dnipro	Transfer	Free	

=== Out ===
Date	Pos.	Player	Age	Moving to	Type	Fee	Source
Summer
15 June 1998	DF	(Ukraine) Leonid Haidarzhy	20	Unattached	Transfer	Free	
15 June 1998	DF	(Ukraine) Serhiy Sapronov	20	Unattached	Transfer	Free	
15 June 1998	DF	(Ukraine) Ihor Zelenyuk	20	Mykolaiv	Transfer	Free	
15 June 1998	MF	(Ukraine) Igor Vysochansky	20	Unattached	Transfer	Free	
Winter
15 January 1999	DF	(Ukraine) Oleh Sobekh	20	(Ukraine) Volyn Lutsk	Transfer	Free	
15 January 1999	DF	(Ukraine) Dmytro Romanenko	20	(Ukraine) Dynamo-2 Kyiv	Transfer	Free	
15 January 1999	MF	(Ukraine) Volodymyr Matsuta	20	(Ukraine) Domostroitel Chernihiv	Transfer	Free	
15 January 1999	FW	(Ukraine) Yuriy Bondarenko	20	(Ukraine) FC Nizhyn	Transfer	Free	
15 January 1999	FW	(Ukraine) Volodymyr Avramenko	20	(Ukraine) Nyva Vinnytsia	Transfer	Free	
15 January 1999	MF	(Ukraine) Oleksandr Savenchuk	20	(Ukraine) FC Dnipro	Transfer	Free	
15 January 1999	MF	(Ukraine) Andriy Vitoshynskyi	20	(Ukraine) Dynamo-3 Kyiv	Transfer	Free	

== Statistics ==
=== Appearances and goals ===
No.	Pos	Nat	Player	Total		Premier League		Cup	
No.	Pos	Nat	Player	Apps	Goals	Apps	Goals	Apps	Goals
Goalkeepers
	GK	(Ukraine) UKR	Ihor Krapyvkin	7	0	7	0	0	0
	GK	(Ukraine) UKR	Yuriy Ovcharov	29	0	29	0	0	0
	GK	(Ukraine) UKR	Oleksandr Mitko	0	0	0	0	0	0
	GK	(Ukraine) UKR	Viktor Litvin	5	0	5	0	0	0
Defenders
	DF	(Ukraine) UKR	Serhiy Sapronov	22	0	22	0	0	0
	DF	(Georgia (country)) GEO	Kakhaberi Sartania	30	0	30	0	0	0
	DF	(Ukraine) UKR	Bohdan Husak	18	0	18	0	0	0
	DF	(Ukraine) UKR	Ihor Zelenyuk	15	0	15	0	0	0
	DF	(Ukraine) UKR	Viktor Rudyi	15	1	15	1	0	0
	DF	(Ukraine) UKR	Yaroslav Zaiats	25	0	25	0	0	0
	DF	(Ukraine) UKR	Volodymyr Kulyk	17	1	17	1	0	0
	DF	(Ukraine) UKR	Dmytro Romanenko	10	0	10	0	0	0
	DF	(Ukraine) UKR	Volodymyr Kolomiets	30	0	30	0	0	0
	DF	(Ukraine) UKR	Vadim Danilevskiy	14	1	14	1	0	0
	DF	(Ukraine) UKR	Oleksandr Babor	3	1	3	1	0	0
	DF	(Ukraine) UKR	Volodymyr Matsuta	18	0	18	0	0	0
	DF	(Ukraine) UKR	Oleksandr Selivanov	16	0	16	0	0	0
	DF	(Ukraine) UKR	Konstantin Poznyak	13	0	13	0	0	0
Midfielders
	MF	(Ukraine) UKR	Ruslan Hilazyev	16	1	16	1	0	0
	MF	(Ukraine) UKR	Volodymyr Avramenko	11	5	11	5	0	0
	MF	(Ukraine) UKR	Volodymyr Holovaty	16	1	16	1	0	0
	MF	(Ukraine) UKR	Oleksandr Savenchuk	11	0	11	0	0	0
	MF	(Ukraine) UKR	Andriy Vitoshynskyi	1	0	1	0	0	0
	MF	(Ukraine) UKR	Zinoviy Vasyliv	18	2	18	2	0	0
	MF	(Ukraine) UKR	Vladimir Drobot	33	1	33	1	0	0
Forwards
	FW	(Ukraine) UKR	Oleksandr Kozhemyachenko	4	1	4	1	0	0
	FW	(Kazakhstan) KAZ	Vladimir Martynov	11	5	11	5	0	0
	FW	(Ukraine) UKR	Yuriy Ovcharenko	12	0	12	0	0	0
	FW	(Georgia (country)) GEO	Gocha Gogokhia	21	4	21	4	0	0
	FW	(Ukraine) UKR	Peter Pilipeyko	26	2	26	2	0	0
Players transferred out during the season
	MF	(Ukraine) UKR	Volodymyr Matsuta	18	0	18	0	0	0

Source: Competitions

Last updated: 9 May 2021

=== Goalscorers ===
Rank	No.	Pos	Nat	Name	Premier League	Cup	Europa League	Total
1		MF	(Ukraine)	Volodymyr Avramenko	5	0	0	5
1		FW	(Kazakhstan)	Vladimir Martynov	5	0	0	5
2		FW	(Georgia (country))	Gocha Gogokhia	4	0	0	4
3		MF	(Ukraine)	Zinoviy Vasyliv	2	0	0	2
3		DF	(Ukraine)	Viktor Rudyi	1	0	0	1
3		MF	(Ukraine)	Volodymyr Holovaty	1	0	0	1
3		MF	(Ukraine)	Ruslan Hilazyev	1	0	0	1
3		FW	(Ukraine)	Oleksandr Kozhemyachenko	1	0	0	1
3		DF	(Ukraine)	Volodymyr Kulyk	1	0	0	1
3		DF	(Ukraine)	Vladimir Drobot	1	0	0	1
3		MF	(Ukraine)	Oleksandr Babor	1	0	0	1
3		DF	(Ukraine)	Vadim Danilevskiy	1	0	0	1
				Total	24	0	0	24

Last updated: 31 May 2019
