= Piskun =

Piskun (Ukrainian or Belarusian: Піскун; Russian: Пискун) is a gender-neutral Slavic surname that may refer to the following notable people:

- Elena Piskun (born 1978), Belarusian former artistic gymnast
- Eduard Piskun (born 1967), Ukrainian football player
- Jerzy Piskun (1938–2018), Polish basketball player
- Svyatoslav Piskun (born 1959), Ukrainian lawyer and politician
- Andrew Piskun (born 1976), Australian musician
