= Vasyliv (surname) =

Vasyliv is a surname. Notable people with the surname include:

- Ihor Vasyliv (born 1979), Ukrainian politician
- Zinoviy Vasyliv (born 1973), Ukrainian footballer
