= Anzor Kavteladze =

Georgian footballer

Personal information
- Date of birth: 22 June 1969 (age 57)
- Place of birth: Chiatura, Georgia
- Height: 1.92 m (6 ft 4 in)
- Position: Centre back

Senior career*
Years	Team	Apps	(Gls)
1991–1994	Chiatura	15	(76)
1993–1994	Desna Chernihiv	18	(0)
1994–1995	Vorskla Poltava	14	(2)
1994–1995	Desna Chernihiv	5	(1)
1994–1996	Kremin Kremenchuk	33	(3)
1995–1996	Elektron Romny	5	(1)
1995–1996	Hoverla Uzhhorod	5	(0)
1996–1996	Elektron Romny	17	(5)
1997–1998	Dnipro Cherkasy	0	(0)
1997–1998	Chiatura	27	(2)
1998–1999	Guria Lanchkhuti	14	(0)
1999–2000	Chiatura	11	(9)
2000	Nizhny	14	(2)
- * Club domestic league appearances and goals as of 22 November 2021

Anzor Kavteladze (Georgian: ანზორ ქავთელაძე; born 22 July 1969 in Chiatura) is a professional Georgian football midfielder.

== Club career ==
Kavteladze, started his career with the club of Chiatura in Georgia. In 1993 he moved to Desna Chernihiv in Ukraine where he played 18 games. Then he played for Vorskla Poltava and then returned to Desna Chernihiv where he played 5 matches and scored 1 goal. In 1994 he moved to Kremin Kremenchuk, then in Elektron Romny in Hoverla Uzhhorod. In 1996 he moved again to Elektron Romny then in Dnipro Cherkasy. In 1997 he moved again to Chiatura where he played 27 games and scored 2 goals. In 1998 he moved to Guria Lanchkhuti and then in Chiatura. In 2000 he returned to Ukraine with Nizhny.
