= Volodymyr Kulyk =

Ukrainian footballer and coach

Personal information
- Full name: Volodymyr Mykolayovych Kulyk
- Date of birth: 1 October 1969 (age 57)
- Place of birth: Sumy, Ukrainian SSR, USSR
- Position: Defender

Senior career*
Years	Team	Apps	(Gls)
1993-1997	Desna Chernihiv	132	(6)
1997	Nerefa Slavutych	16	(0)
1998	Fakel Varva	15	(0)
1999	Desna Chernihiv	17	(1)
1999–2000	Elektron Romny	36	(3)
2000	Naftovyk Okhtyrka	1	(0)
2001	Desna Chernihiv	29	(1)

Managerial career
- 2003-2010: Yunist Chernihiv (academy)
- 2011–2012: Lehenda Chernihiv (Coach)
- 2012–2013: Lehenda Chernihiv (Head Coach)
- 2014: Lehenda Chernihiv (Coach)
- 2015-2018: Lehenda Chernihiv (Head Coach)
- 2018: Skala Stryi (academy)
- 2019–2022: Yednist-ShVSM Plysky (Head Coach)
- * Club domestic league appearances and goals

Volodymyr Kulyk (Russian: Кулик Владимир Николаевич; born 1 October 1969) is a retired Ukrainian football player and coach. He spent most of his career to Desna Chernihiv.

== Playing career ==
Kulyk started his professional career in Desna Chernihiv playing in the 1993–94 Ukrainian First League season. He made his professional debut in an away game against Spartak Okhtyrka in the 1993–94 Ukrainian Cup on 1 August 1993.

During the 2000–01 season, while playing for Elektron Romny, Kulyk was offered a contract from Desna which at that time was led by Yuriy Hruznov. After the first half of 2001–02 season, he was injured during a training session, after which Desna gave Kulyk some money for an operation and let him go. He soon retired thereafter.

== Coaching career ==
From 2003 to 2010, Kulyk was a coach at the Yunist Chernihiv academy. In 2011 he was invited to try his hand with women's football as an assistant coach for Serhiy Sapronov at Lehenda Chernihiv, where he remained from 2011 to 2018. In both 2011 and 2015, he managed to bring the team to second place in the Ukrainian Women's League. In 2018, due to poor financing, Lehenda Chernihiv was merged with Yednist-ShVSM Plysky's women's side and Kulyk moved to the Skala Stryi youth academy as its under-15 boys team coach. In 2019 he became the coach of Yednist-ShVSM Plysky.

== Honours ==
As player

Desna Chernihiv

- Ukrainian Second League: 1996–97
