= David Rukhadze =

Georgian footballer

Personal information
- Full name: David Nikolaevich Rukhadze
- Date of birth: 6 March 1963 (age 63)
- Place of birth: Georgia SSR, USSR
- Height: 1.84 m (6 ft 0 in)
- Position: Defender

Senior career*
Years	Team	Apps	(Gls)
1982	Meshakhte Tkibuli	1	(0)
1985–1989	Lokomotiv Samtredia	104	(5)
1989–1992	Kolkheti Khobi	103	(1)
1992–1993	Torpedo Kutaisi	27	(0)
1993–1994	Chiatura	16	(1)
1993–1994	Desna Chernihiv	9	(1)
1994–1995	Guria Lanchkhuti	10	(1)
1995–1996	Sioni Bolnisi	15	(1)
1996	Zvezda Irkutsk	2	(0)
1996–1997	Torpedo Kutaisi	13	(0)
1997	Yekaterinburg	24	(1)
- * Club domestic league appearances and goals as of 12 January 2022

David Rukhadze (Georgian: დავით რუხაძე; born 9 September 1963 in Tbilisi) is a professional Georgian footballer.

== Career ==
Having finished his football career in the team of another league Meshakhte Tkibuli. In 1985–1989, he was a rock musician at Lokomotiv (Samtredia). During the 1987 season, the team won the first place at the Other Lizi (9th zone). In 1989 he moved to Kolkheti Khobi. In total for the whole team has played 103 matches in the championships of the USSR and Georgia. From 1992 to 1993 he played for Torpedo Kutaisi.

During the winter season, interrupt the 1993–94 season and he moved to Desna Chernihiv, the main club in the city of Chernihiv, where he made its debut on 27 March 1994 in the home match of the 21st round of the Ukrainian Second League against Naftovyk Okhtyrka. David was on the field at the starting match and played the whole match. Sheds 1994 to rock won 9 singles at the First Lizi of Ukraine. Then he turned to Georgia, for the clubs Guria Lanchkhuti, Sioni Bolnisi and Torpedo Kutaisi. In 1996 and 1997, he played in First Russian Championship for Zvezda Irkutsk and Yekaterinburg.

From 1998 to 2010 he worked as a coach at the children school "Dynamo" (Kutaisi), then with the teams "Imereti" and "Meshakhte". In 2016, he got rid of the Іmereti football federation.
