= Nikoloz Kheladze =

Georgian professional footballer

Personal information
- Full name: Хеладзе Николоз Гивиевич
- Date of birth: 30 May 1972 (age 54)
- Place of birth: Georgia SSR, USSR
- Height: 1.84 m (6 ft 0 in)
- Position: Goalkeeper

Senior career*
Years	Team	Apps	(Gls)
1990	Ukimerioni Kutaisi	3	(0)
1990–1993	Torpedo Kutaisi	36	(0)
1993–1994	Magaroeli Chiatura	13	(0)
1993–1994	Desna Chernihiv	2	(0)
1994–1996	Torpedo Kutaisi	46	(0)
1996–1997	Torpedo-2 Kutaisi	4	(0)
1996–1997	Torpedo Kutaisi	4	(0)
1997	Angusht Nazran	3	(0)
- * Club domestic league appearances and goals as of 12 January 2022

Nikoloz Kheladze (Georgian: ნიკოლოზ ხელაძე; born 30 May 1972) is a professional Georgian footballer.

== Career ==
Since 1990 he has played in the Georgian Premier League for Torpedo Kutaisi and Magaroeli Chiatura. In 1991 he became a bronze medalist of the Georgian championship.

In 1994 he joined the Ukrainian team Desna Chernihiv. In the T-shirt of the Chernihiv club on April 29, 1994, in the lost (2: 3) away match of the 28th round of the First League against Mukachevo "Carpathians". Nikoloz came on the field in the starting lineup, and in the 46th minute he was replaced by Yuri Melashenko. The Georgian goalkeeper failed to gain a foothold in Desna. From the end of April to the beginning of May 1994 he played 2 matches in the First League of Ukraine. During the 1994–95 season he returned to Torpedo. In 1997 he played for the Russian club Angusht Nazran.
