= Andriy Vitoshynskyi =

Ukrainian footballer (born 1981)

Personal information
- Full name: Andriy Vitoshynskyi
- Date of birth: 21 February 1981 (age 45)
- Place of birth: Soviet Union
- Height: 1.75 m (5 ft 9 in)
- Position: Midfielder

Senior career*
Years	Team	Apps	(Gls)
1998	Dynamo-3 Kyiv	4	(0)
1999	Desna Chernihiv	1	(0)
2000–2001	CSKA-2 Kyiv	4	(0)
2001	Systema-Boreks Borodianka	0	(0)
2005–2006	Yednist' Plysky	42	(1)
2007–2008	Zakarpattia Uzhhorod	24	(1)
2009	Poltava	10	(0)
- * Club domestic league appearances and goals as of 02:32, 20 February 2011 (UTC)

Andriy Vitoshynskyi (Ukrainian: Андрій Вітошинський; born 21 February 1981) is a Ukrainian footballer who has played for Ukrainian Premier League club FC Zakarpattia Uzhhorod.
