= Eduard Piskun =

Ukrainian footballer (born 1967)

Personal information
- Full name: Eduard Oleksandrovych Piskun
- Date of birth: 1 January 1967 (age 59)
- Place of birth: Zhdanov, Ukrainian SSR
- Height: 1.72 m (5 ft 8 in)
- Positions: Defender; forward; midfielder

Youth career
- KhGVUFK-1 Kharkiv

Senior career*
Years	Team	Apps	(Gls)
1984–1985	Mayak Kharkiv	62	(4)
1986	Atlantyka Sevastopol	13	(4)
1986–1987	SKA Kyiv	57	(6)
1988–1989	Chayka Sevastopol	82	(11)
1989–1990	Metalurh Zaporizhzhia	18	(2)
1990	Chayka Sevastopol	19	(4)
1991	Tavriya Simferopol	27	(1)
1992–1994	Naftovyk Okhtyrka	77	(14)
1994	KAMAZ Naberezhnye Chelny	2	(0)
1994	→ KAMAZ-d Naberezhnye Chelny (loan)	1	(0)
1994–1995	Naftovyk Okhtyrka	38	(5)
1995–1996	Zirka-NIBAS Kirovohrad	24	(0)
1996	Kuban Krasnodar	13	(0)
1996	→ Kuban-d Krasnodar (loan)	6	(3)
1997	Nyva Bershad	15	(1)
1998	Nyva Vinnytsia	28	(0)
1999	Papirnyk Malyn	11	(1)
1999	Systema-Boreks Borodianka	15	(1)
2000–2001	Elektron Romny	21	(0)
- * Club domestic league appearances and goals

Eduard Oleksandrovych Piskun (Ukrainian: Едуард Олександрович Піскун; born 1 January 1967) is a Ukrainian former professional football player.

== Personal life ==
His son Vladyslav Piskun is also a professional footballer.
