= Ihor Zelenyuk =

Ukrainian footballer

Personal information
- Date of birth: 15 October 1972 (age 54)
- Place of birth: Ukrainian SSR, USSR
- Height: 1.84 m (6 ft 0 in)
- Position: Defender

Senior career*
Years	Team	Apps	(Gls)
1993–1994	Krystal Chortkiv	37	(1)
1994	Nyva Ternopil	2	(0)
1994	Bukovyna Chernivtsi	6	(0)
1995	Krystal Chortkiv	34	(0)
1996	Ros Bila Tserkva	2	(0)
1996–1997	Nyva Ternopil	29	(0)
1998	Desna Chernihiv	15	(0)
1999–2000	Mykolaiv	40	(0)
2000	→ Olimpiya FC AES Yuzhnoukrainsk (loan)	2	(0)
2001	Tobol	29	(1)
- * Club domestic league appearances and goals

Ihor Zelenyuk (Ukrainian: Ігор Михайлович Зеленюк) is a Ukrainian retired footballer.

== Career ==
He started playing in the Ukrainian championship in 1993 in the first league team Krystal Chortkiv. In his first match (against Desna Chernihiv), Zelenyuk scored his first and last goal in the Ukrainian championships.

The following year, Igor moved to Ternopil's Niva, where he played two matches in the top league of the Ukrainian championship. The first match: July 17, 1994 Nyva Ternopil - "Temp" (0: 0). Unable to establish himself in the team from the "tower", Zelenyuk returned to the Ukrainian First League in Bukovyna Chernivtsi, and then - back in the Krystal Chortkiv.

In 1996, Zelenyuk played for the second time in the major league, which he left in the same season with the team Nyva Ternopil. The third arrival in "tower" for Igor passed according to the scenario of the second, - his Mykolaiv also following the results of a season lost a place in the top division.

In 2001, the footballer played in the championship of Kazakhstan for Tobol, with which he took sixth place.
