= Zinoviy Vasyliv =

Soviet footballer and Ukrainian coach

Personal information
- Full name: Zinoviy Vasylyovych Vasyliv
- Date of birth: 3 June 1973 (age 53)
- Place of birth: Ukrainian SSR, USSR
- Height: 1.84 m (6 ft 0 in)
- Position: Midfielder

Senior career*
Years	Team	Apps	(Gls)
1993–1994	Khutrovyk Tysmenytsia	32	(4)
1994–1995	Prykarpattia Ivano-Frankovsk	1	(0)
1995–1996	Khutrovyk Tysmenytsia	68	(11)
1996–1997	Prykarpattia Ivano-Frankovsk	2	(0)
1996–1997	Krystal Chortkiv	1	(0)
1996–1997	Khutrovyk Tysmenytsia	18	(2)
1997–1998	Prykarpattia Ivano-Frankovsk	1	(0)
1997–1998	Khutrovyk Tysmenytsia	31	(9)
1998–1999	Vinnytsia	17	(5)
1998–1999	Desna Chernihiv	18	(2)
1999–2000	Vinnytsia	28	(7)
2000–2001	Prykarpattia Ivano-Frankovsk	12	(0)
2000–2001	Vinnytsia	15	(1)
2000–2001	Podillya Khmelnytskyi	1	(0)
2001–2002	Prykarpattia Ivano-Frankovsk	3	(0)
2001–2002	Enerhetyk Burshtyn	2	(4)
2001–2002	Happy End Camenca	14	(3)
2003–2004	Tekhno-Tsentr Rohatyn	12	(0)
2004–2005	Fakel Ivano-Frankivsk	12	(0)

Managerial career
- 2016–2021: Prykarpattia Ivano-Frankivsk (coach)
- * Club domestic league appearances and goals

Zinoviy Vasylyovych Vasyliv (Ukrainian: Зіновій Васильович Василів; born 3 June 1973) is a Ukrainian football coach and former player.

== Playing career ==
On 21 August 1992, he began his football career at Khutrovyk Tysmenytsia. On 5 March 1995, he made his debut for Prikarpatye Ivano-Frankovsk in a match against Dynamo Kyiv. After that he played again in "Khutrovyk", and also played one match in Krystal Chortkiv. In the summer of 1998 he moved to Desna Chernihiv. During the winter break of the 1998–99 season, he transferred to Vinnytsia. In early 2001 he returned to Prikarpatye Ivano-Frankovsk. He also played two matches for Burshtyn's Energetika, and in August left for Moldova, where he defended the colors of the first-league Happy End (Kamianka). In early 2003 he returned home and then played in Prikarpatye Ivano-Frankovsk in the amateur championship of Ukraine. In the 2003–04 season he performed at the Techno-Center club (Rohatyn). In the summer of 2004 he accepted an invitation to the newly created Fakel (Ivano-Frankivsk), where at the end of the year he ended his career as a professional football player. After that he played in amateur clubs "Luzhany", "Karpaty" (Yaremche), Khutrovyk Tysmenytsia and "Cheremosh" (Verkhovyna).

== Coaching career ==
From July 2016 Vasyliv worked in the coaching staff of Prykarpattia Ivano-Frankivsk.
