= Oleh Sobekh =

Soviet footballer and Ukrainian coach (born 1976)

Personal information
- Full name: Собех Олег Михайлович
- Date of birth: 6 June 1976 (age 50)
- Place of birth: Chernihiv, Ukrainian SSR, USSR
- Height: 1.84 m (6 ft 0 in)
- Position: Defender

Senior career*
Years	Team	Apps	(Gls)
1993–1998	Desna Chernihiv	113	(5)
1997–1998	→ Slavutich-Chernobyl (On Loan)	16	(0)
1998–1999	Desna Chernihiv	15	(2)
1998–2000	Volyn Lutsk	33	(2)
2000–2001	Desna Chernihiv	13	(2)
2000–2001	Volyn Lutsk	6	(0)
2001–2003	Desna Chernihiv	33	(1)
2003–2007	FC Nizhyn	15	(0)
- * Club domestic league appearances and goals as of 15 January 2022

Oleh Sobekh (Ukrainian: Собех Олег Михайлович; born June 6, 1976) is a retired Ukrainian football player.

== Career ==
Oleh Sobekh started his career in 1993 with Desna Chernihiv, where he played until December 1997 where he played 113 matches and scored 5 goals and in the season 1996–97 with the club of Chernihiv he won the Ukrainian Second League. In January 1998 he played 16 matches with Slavutich-Chernobyl. In 1998 he returned to Desna Chernihiv where he played 15 matches and scored 2 goals. Then he moved to Volyn Lutsk where he played 33 matches and scored 2 goals. In 2000 he returned again to Desna Chernihiv where he played 13 matches and scored 2 goals. He also played 6 matches for Volyn Lutsk. In 2001 he returned to Desna Chernihiv for two seasons and he played 33 matches and scored 1 goal. In 2003 he moved to FC Nizhyn, where stayed until 2007 and he played 15 matches.

== Honours ==
Volyn Lutsk

- Ukrainian First League: 2001–02

Desna Chernihiv

- Ukrainian Second League: 1996–97
