= Gocha Gogokhia =

Georgian footballer

Personal information
- Full name: Гогохия Гоча Гурджаниевич
- Date of birth: 22 June 1969 (age 57)
- Place of birth: Georgia SSR
- Height: 1.92 m (6 ft 4 in)
- Position: Forward

Senior career*
Years	Team	Apps	(Gls)
1993–1994	Desna Chernihiv	13	(3)
1993–1994	Stroitel (Brovary)	5	(0)
1994–1995	Desna Chernihiv	14	(1)
1994–1995	Vorskla Poltava	7	(0)
1995–1998	Fakel Varva	46	(15)
1997–1998	Domostroitel Chernihiv	2	(1)
1998–1999	Desna Chernihiv	21	(4)
2000–2001	FC Nizhyn	14	(8)
2002	Yevropa Pryluky	2	(0)
2002–2003	FC Nizhyn	11	(5)
2003–2004	Yednist Plysky	14	(14)
- * Club domestic league appearances and goals as of 31 January 2022

Gocha Gogokhia (Georgian: Гогохия Гоча Гурджаниевич; born 22 July 1969) is a professional football forward.

== Club career ==
Gocha Gogokhia, started his career in 1993 with Desna Chernihiv the main club of the city of Chernihiv in Ukrainian First League, where he played 13 matches and scored 3 goals. In January 1994 he moved to Stroitel (Brovary) where he played 5 matches. In summer 1994 he moved back to Desna Chernihiv in Ukrainian Second League here he played 14 matches and scored 1 goal. In January 1995 he moved to Vorskla Poltava where he played 7 matches. In summer 1995 he moved to Fakel Varva for three season where he played 46 matches and scored 15 goals. Here he won the Chernihiv Oblast Football Championship in 1995 and 1996 he also won the Chernihiv Oblast Football Cup in 1995. In 1998 he moved back to Desna Chernihiv in Ukrainian First League where in the season 1998–99 he played 21 matches and scored 4 goals. In summer 2000 he moved to Nizhyn where he managed to play 25 matches and scored 13 goals and also here won the Chernihiv Oblast Football Championship in 2000 and the Chernihiv Oblast Football Cup in 2000, 2001 and 2003. In summer 2004 he moved to Yednist Plysky where he played 14 matches and scored 14 goals.

== Honours ==
Nizhyn

- Chernihiv Oblast Football Championship: 2000
- Chernihiv Oblast Football Cup: 2000, 2001, 2003

Fakel Varva

- Chernihiv Oblast Football Championship: 1995, 1996
- Chernihiv Oblast Football Cup: 1995
