= Viktor Rudyi =

Soviet footballer

Viktor Rudoy Рудой Владимирович
Personal information
- Full name: Рудой Виктор Владимирович
- Date of birth: 11 February 1962 (age 64)
- Place of birth: Zhytomyr, Ukrainian SSR, USSR
- Position: Midfielder

Youth career
- SDYuShOR Desna
- Desna-3 Chernihiv

Senior career*
Years	Team	Apps	(Gls)
1980–1983	Desna Chernihiv	160	(20)
1984	Metalurh Zaporizhya	12	(0)
1985–1989	Nyva Vinnytsia	175	(28)
1989–1990	Desna Chernihiv	61	(5)
1991	Naftovyk Okhtyrka	1	(0)
1991	Bukovyna Chernivtsi	3	(0)
1992–1993	Cheksyl Chernihiv		
1993	Nyva Vinnytsia	2	(0)
1994	Desna Chernihiv	9	(0)
1994–1995	Torpedo Mogilev	43	(4)
1995–1996	Ros Bila Tserkva	17	(2)
1996–1997	Hapoel Ashkelon		
1997–1998	Desna Chernihiv	24	(1)
1998	Domobudivnyk Chernihiv	5	(3)
1999	Desna Chernihiv	15	(1)
- * Club domestic league appearances and goals

Viktor Rudoy (Ukrainian: Рудой Виктор Владимирович; born 11 February 1962) is a retired Soviet and Ukrainian football player. He spend most of his career to Desna Chernihiv the main club in Chernihiv.

== Career ==
A pupil of the Chernigov Children's and Youth Sports School of Desna Chernihiv, coaches - Miroslav Mandrik, Efim Shkolnikov. Since 1980 he played at the senior level for the Desna Chernihiv in the second league of the USSR. In 1982 he became the second prize-winner of the Ukrainian SSR championship among the teams of the second league. In 1984 he moved to Metalurh Zaporizhya, who played in the first league, but played only 12 matches, in all of them he came out on substitutions. In 1985 he moved to Nyva Vinnytsia, spent four and a half seasons with it, having played 175 matches in the second league. In the summer of 1989 he temporarily returned to Desna Chernihiv, which played in the second and then in the second lower league. In the last season of the USSR championship, he played in the second lower league for Neftyanik (Akhtyrka) and in the first league for Bukovyna Chernivtsi, but he could not gain a foothold anywhere. After the collapse of the USSR, he played for some time in amateur competitions in Chernigov. In the summer of 1993, he moved to Nyva Vinnytsia and played 2 matches in the Ukrainian Premier League. He played his debut match in the tournament on August 8, 1993, against Torpedo Zaporizhia, replacing Viktor Budnik in the 76th minute. At the beginning of 1994 he returned to Desna Chernihiv, which played in the first league and finished there last in IN 1999 and also played few games with Domostroitel Chernihiv.

== Honours ==
Naftovyk Okhtyrka

- Championship of the Ukrainian SSR: 1991

Desna Chernihiv

- Ukrainian Second League: 1996–97

Torpedo Mogilev

- Belarusian Cup: Runners-up 1994–95

Desna Chernihiv

- Championship of the Ukrainian SSR: Runner-up 1982
