= Yuriy Nadtochiy =

Ukrainian footballer (born 1967)

Personal information
- Date of birth: 3 July 1967 (age 59)
- Place of birth: Chernihiv, Ukrainian SSR, Soviet Union
- Position: Defender

Senior career*
Years	Team	Apps	(Gls)
1985	Desna Chernihiv	23	(1)
1990–1996	Desna Chernihiv	254	(4)
1997	Gomel	9	(0)
1997	Slavutych	7	(0)
1997–1999	Domostroitel Chernihiv	11	(0)
- * Club domestic league appearances and goals

Yuriy Nadtochiy (Ukrainian: Надточий Юрий Николаевич; born 3 July 1967) is a Ukrainian former professional football defender who played most of his career in Desna Chernihiv.

== Career ==
In 1985, Nadtochiy started his career with Desna Chernihiv the main club in Chernihiv. Here he stayed until 1996, where he played 277 games and scored 5 goals. In 1997 he moved to Gomel in the city of Gomel in Belarus, where he managed to win the Belarusian First League in the season 1997. Then he returned to Ukraine joining Slavutych in the city of Slavutych and then he ended his career with Domostroitel Chernihiv a team in the city of Chernihiv. In 2016 he took part of Veterans of Desna Chernihiv took part in an international football tournament, which took place in Zhodino, Belarus. The honor of the Chernihiv region in Belarus was defended by Savenchuk Alexander, Andrey Belousov, Selivanov Alexander, Rubanchuk Valery, Team Peter, Matsuta Vladimir, Prokha Oleg, Zhornyak Igor, Pilipeyko Peter, Simchuk Igor.

== Honours ==
Gomel

- Belarusian First League: 1997

Desna Chernihiv

- Ukrainian Second League: 1996–97
