= Yuriy Yakovenko (footballer, born 1971) =

Soviet footballer and Ukrainian coach

Personal information
- Full name: Yuriy Viktorovych Yakovenko
- Date of birth: 19 December 1971 (age 54)
- Place of birth: Bakhmach, Ukrainian SSR, USSR
- Height: 1.84 m (6 ft 0 in)
- Position: Forward

Senior career*
Years	Team	Apps	(Gls)
1990–1993	Desna Chernihiv	134	(26)
1993–1997	Kryvbas Kryvyi Rih	99	(11)
1997	Torpedo Arzamas	39	(19)
1998–1999	Torpedo-ZIL Moscow	41	(15)
1999–2001	Desna Chernihiv	40	(21)
2001–2002	Zirka Kropyvnytskyi	17	(4)
2001–2002	Desna Chernihiv	16	(7)
2003–2004	Zirka Kropyvnytskyi	27	(2)
2003–2004	Desna Chernihiv	14	(0)
- * Club domestic league appearances and goals as of 28 November 2021

Yuriy Viktorovych Yakovenko (Ukrainian: Юрій Вікторович Яковенко; born 19 December 1971, Bakhmach) is a Soviet and Ukrainian retired football player.

== Career ==
He began playing at the adult level in 1990 as part of the Desna Chernihiv, as part of which he spent two seasons in the Soviet Second League of the USSR and two - in the Ukrainian First League of Ukraine.

In 1993 he moved to Kryvbas Kryvyi Rih. He made his Premier League debut on 8 August 1993 against Luhansk Zari, and scored his first goal on 8 October 1993 against Dnipro. He spent three and a half seasons with the club from Krivoy Rog, played 99 matches in the top league and scored 11 goals.

In 1997 he played in the second division of Russia for Torpedo Arzamas, became the best scorer of his club with 19 goals. In 1998, as part of Torpedo-ZIL Moscow became the winner of the zonal tournament of the second division, the following year he played for the team only one match in the first division.

In 1999 he returned to Desna Chernihiv, where he scored 16 goals in the 2000/01 season and became the silver medalist of the zonal tournament of the second league. In early 2002 he moved to Zirka Kropyvnytskyi, became the winner of the first league of the 2002/03 season. In the 2003/04 season he played 10 matches and scored one goal in the Premier League as a member of Zvezda, but in the middle of the season he returned to Desna. In 2004 he finished his sports career.

In total, he played 109 matches and scored 12 goals in the Ukrainian Premier League. As part of the Desna Chernihiv in the championships of the USSR and Ukraine scored 57 goals, is among the top ten scorers of the club in history.

He graduated from the Faculty of Physical Education of Chernihiv Pedagogical University. Since 2004 he has been working as a graphic designer.
