= Ihor Chetveryk =

Ukrainian footballer

Personal information
- Full name: Ihor Mykolayovych Chetveryk
- Date of birth: 2 June 1965 (age 61)
- Place of birth: Ukrainian SSR, Soviet Union
- Position: Forward

Senior career*
| Years | Team | Apps | (Gls) |
| 1987–1994 | Desna Chernihiv | 240 | (45) |
| 1994–1995 | Dnipro Cherkasy | 15 | (3) |
| 1995–1996 | Fakel Varva | 6 | (0) |
| 1996–1999 | Dnipro Cherkasy | 43 | (1) |
| 2000–2001 | Sirius Fotboll | 6 | (3) |
- * Club domestic league appearances and goals as of 14 November 2021

Ihor Mykolayovych Chetveryk (Ukrainian: Ігор Миколайович Четверик; born 2 June 1965) is a former Ukrainian professional footballer who played as a forward.

== Career ==
Chetveryk started his career with Desna Chernihiv, where he played 240 matches and served as captain between 1987 and 1994. He then jumped between several clubs, spending two spells with Dnipro Cherkasy before ending his career at Sirius Fotboll.
