= Yuriy Melashenko =

Soviet footballer and Ukrainian coach

Personal information
- Full name: Yuriy Mykhaylovych Melashenko
- Date of birth: 21 April 1970 (age 56)
- Place of birth: Chernihiv, Ukrainian SSR, USSR
- Height: 1.84 m (6 ft 0 in)
- Position: Goalkeeper

Youth career
- SDYuShOR Desna

Senior career*
Years	Team	Apps	(Gls)
1987–1993	Desna Chernihiv	114	(0)
1994–1995	Kryvbas Kryvyi Rih	2	(0)
1994–1995	Desna Chernihiv	5	(0)
1995–1999	Bukovyna Chernivtsi	107	(0)
1999–2002	Desna Chernihiv	104	(0)
2002–2003	Spartak Ivano-Frankivsk	15	(0)
2002–2003	Sokil Zolochiv	2	(0)
2002–2003	Kalush	0	(0)
2003	Navbahor Namangan	2	(0)

Managerial career
- 2010-2013: Yunist Chernihiv
- * Club domestic league appearances and goals as of 24 November 2021

Yuriy Mykhaylovych Melashenko (Ukrainian: Юрій Михайлович Мелашенко) is a Soviet and Ukrainian retired football player who played as a goalkeeper.

== Career ==
As a 17-year-old student, Melashenko became a Desna Chernihiv player, the main club of the city of Chernihiv, where was born. He played there for three season and in 1988, he took part of the Soviet Second League. In the 1991 season, he became the main goalkeeper.

In 1994, he played 2 matches with FC Kryvbas Kryvyi Rih in Vyshcha Liha in the season 1994–95. From 1995 until 1999, he played for Bukovyna Chernivtsi. For 4 seasons he played on the field in 113 matches, becoming the medalist of the Ukrainian First League.

In 1999, he turned to Desna Chernihiv, where he played for 3 seasons. In total for Desna Chernihiv he played 203 matches (194 - in the championships of the USSR and Ukraine and 9 - in the Ukrainian Cup).

In the season 2002–03, he played in the Ukrainian First League for Spartak Ivano-Frankivsk and Sokil Zolochiv. In 2003 he moved to Navbahor Namangan an Uzbek football club based in Namangan, which he got 3rd place in the championship in Uzbekistan.

== After Retirement ==
After the completion of the football career, he started his career as coach. In 2015, having cheated the team of the Chernihiv Collegium No. 11 at the Leather Ball tournament, where the team took 2nd place. From 2010 until 2013, he was a coach at the Yunist Chernihiv.

== Personal life ==
His son Serhiy Melashenko is a football player, goalkeeper that played for the club Desna Chernihiv.
