= Oleksandr Lepekho =

Ukrainian footballer (born 1971)

Personal information
- Date of birth: 25 October 1971 (age 55)
- Place of birth: Chernihiv, Ukrainian SSR, USSR
- Height: 1.84 m (6 ft 0 in)
- Position: Defender

Senior career*
Years	Team	Apps	(Gls)
1992–1993	Desna Chernihiv	39	(0)
1994	Tekstylschyk Chernihiv	13	(0)
1994	Desna Chernihiv	12	(0)
1995	Cheksyl Chernihiv	12	(0)
1995–1997	Nerafa Slavutych	46	(3)
1997–1998	Torpedo-Kadino Mogilev	46	(1)
1999–2002	Desna Chernihiv	54	(0)
2002–2003	FC Nizhyn	20	(1)
- * Club domestic league appearances and goals

Oleksandr Lepekho (Ukrainian: Лепехо Александр Николаевич; born 25 October 1971) is a Ukrainian retired footballer.

== Career ==
Oleksandr Lepekho started his career in 1992 with Desna Chernihiv where he played 39 matches. In 1993 he played 13 matches with Cheksyl Chernihiv another club in the city of Chernihiv. In 1994 he moved back to Desna Chernihiv where he played 12 matches and then he played 12 matches again with Cheksyl Chernihiv. In 1995 he moved to Voskhod Slavutich where he played 30 matches and scored 3 goals in the main time the club changed its name to Nerafa Slavutych. In 1997 he moved to Torpedo Mogilev a club in Belarus where he played 46 matches and scored 1 goal. In 1999 he moved back to Desna Chernihiv in Chernihiv where he played 54 matches in 2002 he moved to Nizhyn playing 20 matches and scored 1 goal.
