= Andriy Kryvenok =

Soviet and Ukrainian footballer

Andrey Krivenok
Personal information
- Full name: Кривенок Андрей Валерьевич
- Date of birth: 25 April 1967 (age 59)
- Place of birth: Chernihiv, Ukrainian SSR, USSR
- Height: 1.84 m (6 ft 0 in)
- Position: Midfielder

Senior career*
| Years | Team | Apps | (Gls) |
| 1985 | Desna Chernihiv | 8 | (0) |
| 1988 | Ghidroteksyl Chernihiv | 0 | (0) |
| 1989 | Turtkulchi Turtkul | 11 | (0) |
| 1990–1997 | Desna Chernihiv | 236 | (19) |
| 1997–1998 | Cheksyl Chernihiv | 0 | (0) |
| 1998–1999 | Fortuna Cheksyl Chernihiv | 8 | (10) |
| 1998–1999 | Domostroitel Chernihiv | 6 | (2) |
| 2003 | Polissya Dobryanka | 1 | (0) |

Managerial career
- 2004: Desna-2 Chernihiv coach
- * Club domestic league appearances and goals as of 31 october 2025

Andrey Krivenok (Ukrainian: Кривенок Андрей Валерьевич) is a retired Soviet and Ukrainian football player.

== Playing career ==
Serhiy Melnichenko started his career in 1985 with Desna Chernihiv, the main club in the city of Chernihiv where he played 8 matches. In 1988 he moved to Ghidroteksyl Chernihiv and in 1989 he moved to Turtkulchi Turtkul where he played 11 matches. In 1990 he returned Desna Chernihiv where he played until 1997 where he played 236 matches and scored 19 goals. Here he won the Ukrainian Second League in season 1996–97. In 1997 he moved back to Cheksyl Chernihiv without playing and then he moved Fortuna Cheksyl Chernihiv where he played 8 matches and scored 10 goals. In the same season he moved to Domostroitel Chernihiv where he played 6 matches and scored 2 goals.

== Coaching career ==
In 2004 he was appointed as coach of Desna-2 Chernihiv, the reserve squad of Desna Chernihiv.

== Honours ==
Desna Chernihiv

- Ukrainian Second League: 1996–97
