= Yuriy Ovcharenko =

Soviet footballer and Ukrainian coach

Personal information
- Date of birth: 25 April 1968 (age 58)
- Place of birth: Ladan, Ukrainian SSR, USSR
- Height: 1.84 m (6 ft 0 in)
- Position: Forward

Senior career*
Years	Team	Apps	(Gls)
1990–1992	Desna Chernihiv	87	(29)
1993–1994	Nyva Vinnytsia	42	(14)
1994	Desna Chernihiv	5	(2)
1994	Nyva Vinnytsia	3	(0)
1994	Podillya Khmelnytskyi	6	(0)
1995	Nyva Vinnytsia	4	(0)
1996	Ros Bila Tserkva	22	(5)
1996–1998	Desna Chernihiv	64	(18)
2000–2001	Fakel Varva	17	(6)
2001–2005	Yevropa Pryluky	32	(8)
- * Club domestic league appearances and goals

Yuriy Ovcharenko (Ukrainian: Овчаренко Юрий Николаевич) is a Ukrainian retired footballer.

== Career ==
He began his football career in 1990 as part of the Ukrainian Second League in Desna Chernihiv. He did not play often that season, played 3 matches and scored 1 goal. The following year he became the main player of the team. On February 16, 1992, he made his debut in Ukrainian Cup, in the lost (0: 1) away match of the 1/32 final against Poltava's Vorskla. Yuri came on the field in the starting lineup and played the whole match. In the first league of the championship of Ukraine he made his debut on March 14, 1992, in the lost (0: 1) away match of the 1st round of subgroup 1 against Sevastopol "Seagull". Ovcharenko came out in the starting lineup and played the whole match. He scored his debut goal for Desna on May 9, 1992, in the 48th minute of the victorious (1: 0) home match of the 15th round of subgroup 1 against Dynamo Kyiv in Kyiv. Ovcharenko came on in the 29th minute, replacing Odeksandr Likhobytsky. In the T-shirt of the Chernihiv team in the championships of Ukraine and the USSR he played 87 matches and scored 29 goals, played another match in the Ukrainian Cup.

During the winter break of the 1992–93 season, he moved to the first-league Vinnytsia's Niva. He made his debut for the new team on March 27, 1993, in a victorious (3-0) home match of the 23rd round against Stryi's Skala. Yuri went on the field in the starting lineup and played the whole match. He scored his debut goal in the Nyva Vinnytsia team's T-shirt on March 30, 1993, in the 11th minute of the winning (3: 1) home match of the 24th round against Uzhhorod's Zakarpattia. Ovcharenko went on the field in the starting lineup and played the whole match. As part of Niva, he played 42 matches in the Ukrainian championship and scored 14 goals, and played 4 more matches (1 goal) in the Ukrainian Cup.
