= Yuriy Bondarenko =

Association football player

Yuriy Bondarenko Volodymyrovych
Personal information
- Full name: Бондаренко Юрий Владимирович
- Date of birth: 14 January 1972 (age 54)
- Place of birth: Chernihiv, Soviet Union (now Ukraine)
- Positions: Midfielder; defender

Youth career
- SDYuShOR Desna

Senior career*
Years	Team	Apps	(Gls)
1988–1993	Desna Chernihiv	157	(6)
1994–1997	Torpedo Zaporizhzhia	89	(9)
1997–2000	Vinnytsia	98	(5)
2000	→ Podillya Khmelnytskyi (loan)	1	(0)
2001–2002	Desna Chernihiv	46	(2)
2002	FC Nizhyn	3	(0)
2002–2003	Stal Kamianske	15	(0)
- * Club domestic league appearances and goals

Yuriy Volodymyrovych Bondarenko (Ukrainian: Юрій Володимирович Бондаренко; born 14 January 1972) is a Ukrainian retired footballer who played as a defender.

== Honours ==
Desna Chernihiv

- Ukrainian Second League: 2000–01
