= Oleksandr Savenchuk =

Soviet footballer

Personal information
- Full name: Савенчук Александр Михайлович
- Date of birth: 9 May 1975 (age 51)
- Place of birth: Chernihiv, Ukrainian SSR, USSR
- Height: 1.70 m (5 ft 7 in)
- Position: Striker

Senior career*
| Years | Team | Apps | (Gls) |
| 1993 | Desna Chernihiv | 35 | (5) |
| 1993–1994 | Torpedo Zaporizhzhia | 4 | (0) |
| 1994–1998 | Desna Chernihiv | 129 | (10) |
| 1999–2000 | Dnipro Dnipropetrovsk | 27 | (1) |
| 1999–2000 | → Dnipro-2 Dnipropetrovsk | 6 | (1) |
| 2000 | FC Nizhyn | 10 | (0) |
| 2001–2004 | Desna Chernihiv | 92 | (16) |
| 2002 | → Sokil Zolochiv (loan) | 2 | (1) |
| 2005 | Slavia Mozyr | 8 | (0) |
- * Club domestic league appearances and goals

Oleksandr Savenchuk (Ukrainian: Савенчук Александр Михайлович; born 9 May 1975) is a Ukrainian former footballer. He spent most of his career at Desna Chernihiv.

== Career ==
He started his career at Desna Chernihiv in 1993, where he played 35 matches and scored 5 goals. In 1993 he moved for one season to Torpedo Zaporizhzhia, where he played 4 games.
