= Andriy Bilousov =

Former Ukrainian footballer and coach

Andrey Belousov
Personal information
- Full name: Белоусов Андрей Владимирович
- Date of birth: 14 January 1972 (age 54)
- Place of birth: Chernihiv, Ukrainian SSR, USSR
- Height: 1.84 m (6 ft 0 in)
- Position: Defender

Youth career
- RVUFK Kyiv

Senior career*
Years	Team	Apps	(Gls)
1991–1994	Desna Chernihiv	47	(1)
1993–1995	Tekstylnyk Chernihiv	24	(0)
1994–1995	Ros Bila Tserkva	7	(0)
1995–1996	Kryvbas Kryvyi Rih	3	(0)
1995–1996	Ros Bila Tserkva	1	(0)
1995–1996	Slavutych	14	(0)
1996–1997	Kryvbas Kryvyi Rih	13	(0)
1998	Krasnoznamensk	31	(0)
1999	Spartak Semey	14	(1)
2000–2001	Volyn Lutsk	12	(2)
2000–2001	Sokil Zolochiv	10	(0)
2001–2002	Volyn Lutsk	5	(0)
2002	Okean Nakhodka	14	(0)
2002–2003	Kovel-Volyn Kovel	6	(0)
2003	Okean Nakhodka	18	(0)
2004–2005	Helios Kharkiv	26	(0)
2005–2006	Mykolaiv	23	(4)
2006–2007	Podillya Khmelnytskyi	17	(0)
2007–2008	Akzhayik	42	(3)
2009	FC Polesie Dobryanka	0	(0)
2011	ATK Chernihiv	0	(0)
- * Club domestic league appearances and goals as of 27 November 2021

Andrey Belousov (Ukrainian: Белоусов Андрей Владимирович) is a retired Ukrainian professional footballer.

== Career ==
Belousov started playing at Chernihiv Polytechnic and then for the local team Desna Chernihiv in Ukrainian Second League. In 1996 he signed with Kryvbas Kryvyi Rih. He made his debut in the Ukrainian Premier League on 20 July 1996 against FC Dnipropetrovsk. In 1999 he moved to Akzhayik in the Kazakh top division.

He spent most of the remainder of his career in the lower divisions of Ukraine, Russia and Kazakhstan.
