= Volodymyr Avramenko =

Ukrainian footballer

Personal information
- Full name: Авраменко Владимир Александрович
- Date of birth: 20 March 1974 (age 52)
- Place of birth: Ukrainian SSR, USSR
- Position: Striker

Senior career*
Years	Team	Apps	(Gls)
1991–2004	Desna Chernihiv (loan)	293	(54)
1993–1994	→ FC Dnipro (loan)	7	(0)
1997–1998	→ Slavutych Chernobyl (loan)	16	(0)
1998–1999	→ Nyva Vinnytsia (loan)	9	(0)
1999–2000	→ Systema-Boreks Borodianka (loan)	15	(1)
2002–2003	→ FC Sokil Zolochiv (loan)	4	(1)
2004	→ FC Smorgon (loan)	12	(2)
2004–2005	Olympia FC NPP Yuzhnoukrainsk	13	(0)
2005–2006	Energiya Yuzhnoukrainsk	14	(0)
2006	Avangard Korukivka	0	(0)
- * Club domestic league appearances and goals

Volodymyr Avramenko (Ukrainian: Авраменко Владимир Александрович; born 20 March 1974) is a retired Ukrainian footballer and coach. He spend most of his career to Desna Chernihiv the main club in Chernihiv.

== Career ==
Avramenko started his career Desna Chernihiv in 1992, remaining there until 2004, having spent a number of seasons out on loan.

== Honours ==
Desna Chernihiv

- Ukrainian Second League: 1996–97
