= Volodymyr Drobot =

Ukrainian footballer

Personal information
- Date of birth: 2 August 1972 (age 54)
- Place of birth: Chernihiv, Ukrainian SSR, USSR
- Height: 1.84 m (6 ft 0 in)
- Position: Defender

Senior career*
Years	Team	Apps	(Gls)
1991–1994	Desna Chernihiv	124	(8)
1994–1995	Tekstylnyk Chernihiv	4	(0)
1994–1999	Desna Chernihiv	98	(4)
1999–2000	Poligraftekhnika Oleksandriya	8	(0)
1999–2000	Dnipro Cherkasy	5	(0)
- * Club domestic league appearances and goals as of 15 January 2022

Vladimir Drobot (Ukrainian: Владимир Васильевич Дробот) is a retired Ukrainian football player.

== Career ==
Volodymyr Drobot started his career in 1991 with Desna Chernihiv, the main club in the city of Chernihiv. In 1995 he played 4 matches with Tekstylnyk Chernihiv, another club in Chernihiv. In 1999 he moved back to Desna Chernihiv until 1999. In summer 1999 he moved to Poligraftekhnika Oleksandriya in the Ukrainian First League where he played 8 matches. In the same season he moved Dnipro Cherkasy where he played 5 matches and here he ended his career.

== Honours ==
Desna Chernihiv

- Ukrainian Second League: 1996–97
