= Yuriy Hruznov =

Soviet football goalkeeper

Personal information
- Full name: Yuriy Mykolayovych Hruznov
- Date of birth: 22 February 1947 (age 79)
- Place of birth: Chernihiv, Ukrainian SSR, Soviet Union
- Height: 1.80 m (5 ft 11 in)
- Position: Goalkeeper

Senior career*
Years	Team	Apps	(Gls)
1965–1966	Dynamo Kyiv	0	(0)
1965	→ Dynamo-2 Kyiv (loan)	4	(0)
1966–1970	Desna Chernihiv	116	(0)
1971	FC Dynamo Khmelnytskyi		
1973–1976	Khimik Chernihiv		

Managerial career
- 1990–1993: Desna Chernihiv
- 1993: Fandok Babruysk
- 1995: Kryvbas Kryvyi Rih
- 1997: Gomel
- 1999–2002: Desna Chernihiv
- 2012: Lehenda-Chernihiv
- 2014: Lehenda-Chernihiv
- * Club domestic league appearances and goals as of 18 March 2023

Yuriy Hruznov (Ukrainian: Юрій Миколайович Грузнов; 22 February 1947) is a former professional Soviet football goalkeeper and later Soviet and Ukrainian coach.

== Coaching career ==
Beside coaching male teams, Hruznov also was a head coach of the Chernihiv city male team FC Desna Chernihiv and female team WFC Lehenda-ShVSM Chernihiv.

== Honours ==
=== As player ===
FC Khimik Chernihiv

- Ukrainian Amateur Football Championship:1976
- Chernihiv Oblast Football Championship 1973, 1974, 1975, 1976
- Chernihiv Oblast Football Cup 1974, 1975

=== As coach ===
Gomel

- Belarusian First League: 1997
