= 1995–96 FC Desna Chernihiv season =

FC Desna Chernihiv
1995–96 season
- President: Ivan Fedorets
- Manager: Yukhym Shkolnykov
- Stadium: Chernihiv Stadium
- Ukrainian Second League: 7th
- Ukrainian Cup: Round of 32 (1/16)
- Top goalscorer: League: Petro Pylypeyko, (15); All: Petro Pylypeyko, (15)
- Highest home attendance: 7000 (vs Kalush, 6 May 1996)
- Lowest home attendance: 100 (vs Obolon Kyiv, 14 September 2026)
- Biggest win: Desna Chernihiv 6-1 Haray Zhovkva
- Biggest defeat: CSKA Kyiv 2-0 Desna Chernihiv; Krystal Kherson 2-0 Desna Chernihiv
Home colours	Away colours

For the 1995–96 season, FC Desna Chernihiv competed in the Ukrainian Second League for the second consecutive season.

== Season summary ==
As coach was confirmed Yukhym Shkolnykov. During the summer transfer window, the contracts of goalkeeper Oleksandr Kuzmik, defender Igor Pakhar, and forward Yuriy Rogovoy were terminated. The goalkeeper Stanislav Tyulenev moved to Russia to join Kolos Krasnodarwhile the defenders Igor Zhornyak and Yuriy Nadtochiy have also moved to Voshod Slavutich and Gomel in Belarus, respectively. At the same time the club signed some players such as such as Ihor Khimanych, Volodymyr Kolomiets, Serhiy Sapronov, Andrey Zakharov, Ruslan Hilazyev, Serhiy Zghura and the striker Andriy Borysyuk. In the Ukrainian Cup, the club reached the third qualifying round, where they were eliminated by Dynamo-2 Kyiv on penalties after regulation time ended 0–0.

== Players ==
=== Squad information ===
As of 24 October 2026

Squad no.	Name	Nationality	Position	Date of birth (age)
Goalkeepers
	Ihor Khimanych	(Ukraine)	GK	11 May 1966 (aged 29)
	Oleksandr Mitko	(Ukraine)	GK	3 August 1974 (aged 20)
Defenders
	Yuriy Nadtochiy (Captain)	(Ukraine)	DF	3 August 1964 (aged 30)
	Oleh Sobekh	(Ukraine)	DF	6 June 1976 (aged 19)
	Yaroslav Zayats	(Ukraine)	DF	8 December 1960 (aged 34)
	Kakhaberi Sartania	(Georgia (country))	DF	8 August 1967 (aged 27)
	Viktor Rudyi	(Ukraine)	DF	11 February 1962 (aged 33)
	Serhiy Sapronov	(Ukraine)	DF	21 October 1961 (aged 33)
	Oleh Ivashchenko	(Ukraine)	DF	5 May 1964 (aged 31)
	Volodymyr Kolomiets	(Ukraine)	DF	14 March 1974 (aged 21)
	Oleksandr Kormich	(Ukraine)	DF	2 October 1972 (aged 22)
	Andriy Kryvenok	(Ukraine)	DF	25 April 1967 (aged 28)
	Volodymyr Kulyk	(Ukraine)	DF	1 October 1969 (aged 25)
	Vadym Danylevskyi	(Ukraine)	DF	9 April 1972 (aged 23)
	Oleksandr Marek	(Ukraine)	DF	27 May 1972 (aged 23)
	Andrey Zakharov	(Ukraine)	DF	22 December 1968 (aged 26)
Midfielders
	Volodymyr Avramenko	(Ukraine)	MF	20 March 1974 (aged 21)
	Oleksandr Savenchuk	(Ukraine)	MF	9 May 1975 (aged 20)
	Ruslan Hilazyev	(Ukraine)	MF	7 January 1977 (aged 18)
	Ihor Bobovych	(Ukraine)	MF	18 November 1975 (aged 19)
	Serhiy Zelinskyi	(Ukraine)	MF	14 January 1972 (aged 23)
	Vladimir Drobot	(Ukraine)	MF	2 August 1972 (aged 22)
	Ihor Lyashenko	(Ukraine)	MF	27 August 1972 (aged 22)
Forwards
	Serhiy Zghura	(Ukraine)	FW	3 November 1977 (aged 17)
	Andriy Borysyuk	(Ukraine)	FW	29 July 1975 (aged 19)
	Yuriy Ovcharenko	(Ukraine)	FW	25 April 1968 (aged 27)
	Petro Pylypeyko	(Ukraine)	FW	1 June 1968 (aged 27)
	Serhiy Datsenko	(Ukraine)	FW	10 December 1977 (aged 17)

== Transfers ==
=== In ===
Date	Pos.	Player	Age	Moving from	Type	Fee	Source
Summer
15 June 1996	GK	(Ukraine) Ihor Khimanych	20	(Ukraine) Hirnyk Kryvyi Rih	Transfer	Free	
15 June 1996	DF	(Ukraine) Volodymyr Kolomiets	20	Unattached	Transfer	Free	
15 June 1996	DF	(Ukraine) Serhiy Sapronov	20	(Ukraine) Bukovyna Chernivtsi	Transfer	Free	
15 June 1996	DF	(Ukraine) Andrey Zakharov	20	(Ukraine) Vodnik Kherson	Transfer	Free	
15 June 1996	MF	(Ukraine) Ruslan Hilazyev	20	(Ukraine) Dynamo-Flesh Odesa	Transfer	Free	
15 June 1996	MF	(Ukraine) Serhiy Zghura	20	(Ukraine) Naftokhimik Kremenchuk	Transfer	Free	
15 June 1996	FW	(Ukraine) Andriy Borysyuk	20	(Ukraine) Nyva Vinnytsia	Transfer	Free	

=== Out ===
Date	Pos.	Player	Age	Moving to	Type	Fee	Source
Summer
15 June 1995	GK	(Kyrgyzstan) Stanislav Tyulenev	20	(Russia) Kolos Krasnodar	Transfer	Free	
15 June 1995	GK	(Ukraine) Oleksandr Kuzmik	20	Unattached	Transfer	Free	
15 June 1995	DF	(Ukraine) Yuriy Nadtochiy	20	(Belarus) Gomel	Transfer	Free	
15 June 1995	DF	(Ukraine) Igor Zhornyak	20	(Ukraine) Voshod Slavutich	Transfer	Free	
15 June 1995	DF	(Ukraine) Igor Pakhar	23	Unattached	Transfer	Free	
16 June 1995	FW	(Ukraine) Yuriy Rogovoy	25	Unattached	Transfer	Free	
Winter
15 January 1996	DF	(Ukraine) Oleksandr Marek	20	(Ukraine) Systema-Boreks Borodianka	Transfer	Free	
15 January 1996	DF	(Ukraine) Andrey Zakharov	20	(Ukraine) Fakel Varva	Transfer	Free	
15 January 1996	FW	(Ukraine) Serhiy Datsenko	20	(Ukraine) Dynamo-2 Kyiv	Transfer	Free	

== Competitions ==
=== Overall ===
Competition	First match	Last match	Starting round	Final position	Record							
Competition	First match	Last match	Starting round	Final position	Pld	W	D	L	GF	GA	GD	Win %
Second League	5 August 1995	29 June 1996	Matchday 1	7th	40	21	9	10	55	30	+25	52.50
Cup	16 October 1995	19 October 1995	First preliminary round	Round of 32 (1/16)	2	1	0	1	0	0	+0	50.00
Total					42	22	9	11	55	30	+25	52.38

Last updated: 30 October 2026
Source: Competitions

=== Ukrainian Second League ===
5 August 1995 1	Desna Chernihiv	2–2	Haray Zhovkva	Chernihiv
19:00 EEST (UTC+03:00)		Report		Stadium: Chernihiv Stadium; Attendance: 2500

8 August 1995 2	Desna Chernihiv	0–0	Skify Lviv	Chernihiv
19:00 EEST (UTC+03:00)		Report		Stadium: Chernihiv Stadium; Attendance: 1500

13 August 1995 3	Ros Bila Tserkva	0–2	Desna Chernihiv	Bila Tserkva
19:00 EEST (UTC+03:00)		Report		Stadium: Trudovi Reservy Stadium; Attendance: 1500

16 August 1995 4	Nyva-Cosmos Myronivka	1–1	Desna Chernihiv	Karapyshi
19:00 EEST (UTC+03:00)		Report		Stadium: Stadium Kolos; Attendance: 1500

21 August 1995 5	Desna Chernihiv	4–0	Dynamo-Flesh Odesa	Chernihiv
19:00 EEST (UTC+03:00)		Report		Stadium: Chernihiv Stadium; Attendance: 2000

24 August 1995 6	Desna Chernihiv	1–0	Olimpiya Yuzhnoukrainsk	Chernihiv
19:00 EEST (UTC+03:00)		Report		Stadium: Chernihiv Stadium; Attendance: 2000

29 August 1995 7	Halychyna Drohobych	1–0	Desna Chernihiv	Drohobych
19:00 EEST (UTC+03:00)		Report		Stadium: Stadium Kranovshchyk; Attendance: 3000

1 September 1995 8	Karpaty Mukacheve	0–0	Desna Chernihiv	Mukachevo
19:00 EEST (UTC+03:00)		Report		Stadium: Pryboryst Stadium; Attendance: 2500

6 September 1995 9	Desna Chernihiv	6–1	Haray Zhovkva	Chernihiv
19:00 EEST (UTC+03:00)		Report		Stadium: Chernihiv Stadium; Attendance: 300

9 September 1995 10	Desna Chernihiv	2–1	Krystal Kherson	Chernihiv
19:00 EEST (UTC+03:00)		Report		Stadium: Chernihiv Stadium; Attendance: 3500

14 September 1995 11	Obolon Kyiv	1–0	Desna Chernihiv	Kiev
19:00 EEST (UTC+03:00)		Report		Attendance: 100

17 September 1995 12	Ahrotekhservis Sumy	2–1	Desna Chernihiv	Sumy
19:00 EEST (UTC+03:00)		Report		Stadium: Avanhard Stadium; Attendance: 1000

22 September 1995 13	Desna Chernihiv	1–1	Kalush	Chernihiv
19:00 EEST (UTC+03:00)		Report		Stadium: Chernihiv Stadium; Attendance: 2000

25 September 1995 14	Desna Chernihiv	1–0	Khutrovyk Tysmenytsia	Chernihiv
19:00 EEST (UTC+03:00)		Report		Stadium: Chernihiv Stadium; Attendance: 1500

3 October 1995 15	Keramik Baranivka	2–1	Desna Chernihiv	Baranivka
19:00 EEST (UTC+03:00)		Report		Attendance: 1500

8 October 1995 16	Desna Chernihiv	2–2	CSKA Kyiv	Chernihiv
19:00 EEST (UTC+03:00)		Report		Stadium: Chernihiv Stadium; Attendance: 2000

11 October 1995 17	Desna Chernihiv	1–0	Systema-Boreks Borodianka	Chernihiv
19:00 EEST (UTC+03:00)		Report		Stadium: Chernihiv Stadium; Attendance: 2000

24 October 1995 18	Hazovyk Komarno	0–2	Desna Chernihiv	Komarno
19:00 EEST (UTC+03:00)		Report		Stadium: Stadium Gazovyk; Attendance: 1000

27 October 1995 19	Avanhard Zhydachiv	1–0	Desna Chernihiv	Zhydachiv
19:00 EEST (UTC+03:00)		Report		Stadium: Stadium Avangard; Attendance: 500

1 November 1995 20	Skhid Slavutych	1–0	Desna Chernihiv	Slavutych
19:00 EEST (UTC+03:00)		Report		Stadium: Dynamovets Stadium; Attendance: 600

4 April 1996 21	Desna Chernihiv	2–0	Skhid Slavutych	Chernihiv
19:00 EEST (UTC+03:00)		Report		Stadium: Chernihiv Stadium; Attendance: 1200

9 April 1996 22	Desna Chernihiv	2–0	Avanhard Zhydachiv	Chernihiv
19:00 EEST (UTC+03:00)		Report		Stadium: Chernihiv Stadium; Attendance: 2500

12 April 1996 23	Desna Chernihiv	2–0	Hazovyk Komarno	Chernihiv
19:00 EEST (UTC+03:00)		Report		Stadium: Chernihiv Stadium; Attendance: 3000

17 April 1996 24	Systema-Boreks Borodianka	2–2	Desna Chernihiv	Borodianka
19:00 EEST (UTC+03:00)		Report		Stadium: Stadium Borex; Attendance: 2000

17 April 1996 25	CSKA Kyiv	2–0	Desna Chernihiv	Kiev
19:00 EEST (UTC+03:00)		Report		Stadium: Stadium CSKA; Attendance: 300

25 April 1996 26	Desna Chernihiv	2–0	Keramik Baranivka	Chernihiv
19:00 EEST (UTC+03:00)		Report		Stadium: Chernihiv Stadium; Attendance: 2500

3 May 1996 27	Khutrovyk Tysmenytsia	2–1	Desna Chernihiv	Tysmenytsia
19:00 EEST (UTC+03:00)		Report		Stadium: Stadium Khutrovyk; Attendance: 1000

6 May 1996 28	Kalush	0–1	Desna Chernihiv	Kalush
19:00 EEST (UTC+03:00)		Report		Stadium: Stadium Khimik; Attendance: 7000

10 May 1996 29	Desna Chernihiv	3–0	Ahrotekhservis Sumy	Chernihiv
19:00 EEST (UTC+03:00)		Report		Stadium: Chernihiv Stadium; Attendance: 1200

14 May 1996 30	Desna Chernihiv	1–0	Obolon Kyiv	Chernihiv
19:00 EEST (UTC+03:00)		Report		Stadium: Chernihiv Stadium; Attendance: 3000

19 May 1996 31	Krystal Kherson	2–0	Desna Chernihiv	Kherson
19:00 EEST (UTC+03:00)		Report		Stadium: Krystal Stadium; Attendance: 4000

2 June 2026 32	Desna Chernihiv	0–1	Karpaty Mukacheve	Chernihiv
19:00 EEST (UTC+03:00)		Report		Stadium: Chernihiv Stadium; Attendance: 1500

5 June 2026 33	Desna Chernihiv	2–1	Halychyna Drohobych	Chernihiv
19:00 EEST (UTC+03:00)		Report		Stadium: Chernihiv Stadium; Attendance: 1800

10 June 1996 34	Olimpiya Yuzhnoukrainsk	1–3	Desna Chernihiv	Pivdennoukrainsk
19:00 EEST (UTC+03:00)		Report		Stadium: Stadium Olimp; Attendance: 500

13 June 1996 35	Dynamo-Flesh Odesa	0–1	Desna Chernihiv	Odesa
19:00 EEST (UTC+03:00)		Report		Stadium: Spartak Stadium; Attendance: 1000

18 June 2026 36	Desna Chernihiv	1–1	Nyva-Cosmos Myronivka	Chernihiv
19:00 EEST (UTC+03:00)		Report		Stadium: Chernihiv Stadium; Attendance: 2000

21 June 2026 38	Desna Chernihiv	3–0	Ros Bila Tserkva	Chernihiv
19:00 EEST (UTC+03:00)		Report		Stadium: Chernihiv Stadium; Attendance: 2000

13 June 1996 35	Haray Zhovkva	2–2	Desna Chernihiv	Zhovkva
19:00 EEST (UTC+03:00)		Report		Stadium: Stadium Rostochie; Attendance: 500

=== Ukrainian Cup ===
16 October 1995 Second qualifying round	Desna Chernihiv	0–0 (5–4 p)	Avtomobilist	Chernihiv
17:00 EEST (UTC+03:00)		Report		Stadium: Chernihiv Stadium; Attendance: 1500

19 October 1995 Second qualifying round	Desna Chernihiv	0–0 (5–6 p)	Dynamo-2 Kyiv	Chernihiv
17:00 EEST (UTC+03:00)		Report		Stadium: Chernihiv Stadium; Attendance: 1200

== Statistics ==
=== Appearances and goals ===
No.	Pos	Nat	Player	Total		Ukrainian Second League		Ukrainian Cup		Play-offs	
No.	Pos	Nat	Player	Apps	Goals	Apps	Goals	Apps	Goals	Apps	Goals
Goalkeepers
	GK	(Ukraine) UKR	Ihor Khimanych	31	0	29	0	2	0	0	0
	GK	(Ukraine) UKR	Oleksandr Mitko	13	0	12	0	1	0	0	0
Defenders
	DF	(Ukraine) UKR	Yuriy Nadtochiy	40	0	38	0	2	0	0	0
	DF	(Ukraine) UKR	Oleh Sobekh	27	2	26	2	1	0	0	0
	DF	(Ukraine) UKR	Yaroslav Zaiats	9	0	9	0	0	0	0	0
	DF	(Ukraine) UKR	Peter Komanda	26	0	25	0	1	0	0	0
	DF	(Georgia (country)) GEO	Kakhaberi Sartania	20	0	18	0	2	0	0	0
	DF	(Ukraine) UKR	Oleh Ivashchenko	35	0	33	0	2	0	0	0
	DF	(Ukraine) UKR	Volodymyr Kolomiets	16	0	16	0	0	0	0	0
	DF	(Ukraine) UKR	Oleksandr Kormich	18	0	17	0	1	0	0	0
	DF	(Ukraine) UKR	Andrey Krivenok	32	4	32	4	0	0	0	0
	DF	(Ukraine) UKR	Volodymyr Kulyk	39	5	38	5	1	0	0	0
	DF	(Ukraine) UKR	Serhiy Melnichenko	12	1	12	1	0	0	0	0
Midfielders
	MF	(Ukraine) UKR	Volodymyr Avramenko	34	6	32	6	2	0	0	0
	MF	(Ukraine) UKR	Oleksandr Savenchuk	38	7	36	7	2	0	0	0
	MF	(Ukraine) UKR	Ruslan Hilazyev	14	1	14	1	0	0	0	0
	MF	(Ukraine) UKR	Ihor Bobovych	28	6	28	4	0	2	0	0
	MF	(Ukraine) UKR	Serhiy Zelinskyi	29	3	27	3	2	0	0	0
	MF	(Ukraine) UKR	Vladimir Drobot	34	1	32	1	2	0	0	0
Forwards
	FW	(Ukraine) UKR	Yuriy Ovcharenko	17	9	17	9	0	0	0	0
	FW	(Ukraine) UKR	Hennadiy Lahomyna	19	1	18	1	1	0	0	0
	FW	(Ukraine) UKR	Petro Pylypeyko	39	15	37	15	2	0	0	0
Players transferred out during the season
	DF	(Ukraine) UKR	Oleksandr Marek	7	0	7	0	0	0	0	0
	DF	(Ukraine) UKR	Andrey Zakharov	2	0	2	0	0	0	0	0
	FW	(Ukraine) UKR	Serhiy Datsenko	16	3	14	3	2	0	0	0

Source: Competitions

Last updated: 25 October 2026

=== Goalscorers ===
Rank	No.	Pos	Nat	Name	Ukrainian Second League	Ukrainian Cup	Play-offs	Total
1		FW	(Ukraine)	Petro Pylypeyko	15	0	0	15
2		FW	(Ukraine)	Yuriy Ovcharenko	9	0	0	9
3		MF	(Ukraine)	Oleksandr Savenchuk	7	0	0	7
4		MF	(Ukraine)	Volodymyr Avramenko	6	0	0	6
5		MF	(Ukraine)	Volodymyr Kulyk	5	0	0	5
6		MF	(Ukraine)	Ihor Bobovych	4	0	0	4
6		DF	(Ukraine)	Andrey Krivenok	4	0	0	4
7		MF	(Ukraine)	Serhiy Zelinskyi	3	0	0	3
8		FW	(Ukraine)	Serhiy Datsenko	3	0	0	3
9		DF	(Ukraine)	Oleh Sobekh	2	0	0	2
10		MF	(Ukraine)	Volodymyr Avramenko	1	0	0	1
11		MF	(Ukraine)	Ruslan Hilazyev	1	0	0	1
12		MF	(Ukraine)	Vladimir Drobot	1	0	0	1
13		FW	(Ukraine)	Hennadiy Lahomyna	1	0	0	1
				Total	62	0	0	62

Last updated: 31 May 2019

=== Clean sheets ===
Rank	No.	Pos	Nat	Name	Ukrainian First League	Ukrainian Cup	Play-offs	Total
1		GK	(Ukraine)	Ihor Khimanych	14	2	0	16
2		GK	(Ukraine)	Oleksandr Mitko	5	1	0	6
				Total	19	3	0	22

Last updated: 25 October 2026

=== Disciplinary record ===
No.	Pos	Nat	Player	Second League			Ukrainian Cup			Play-offs			Total		
No.	Pos	Nat	Player	Yellow card	(yellow card) (yellow-red card)	Red card	Yellow card	(yellow card) (yellow-red card)	Red card	Yellow card	(yellow card) (yellow-red card)	Red card	Yellow card	(yellow card) (yellow-red card)	Red card
	DF	(Ukraine)	Andriy Kryvenok	7	0	0	0	0	0	0	0	0	7	0	0
	MF	(Ukraine)	Oleksandr Savenchuk	7	0	0	0	0	0	0	0	0	7	0	0
	MF	(Ukraine)	Serhiy Zelinskyi	5	0	0	0	0	0	0	0	0	5	0	0
	DF	(Ukraine)	Oleksandr Marek	3	1	0	0	0	0	0	0	0	3	1	0
	FW	(Ukraine)	Hennadiy Lahomyna	3	0	0	0	0	0	0	0	0	3	0	0
	MF	(Ukraine)	Volodymyr Drobot	3	0	0	0	0	0	0	0	0	3	0	0
	DF	(Ukraine)	Oleksandr Kormich	3	0	0	0	0	0	0	0	0	3	0	0
	DF	(Ukraine)	Yuriy Nadtochiy	3	0	0	0	0	0	0	0	0	3	0	0
	DF	(Ukraine)	Volodymyr Kulyk	3	0	0	0	0	0	0	0	0	3	0	0
	MF	(Ukraine)	Volodymyr Avramenko	2	0	0	0	0	0	0	0	0	2	0	0
	DF	(Ukraine)	Oleh Ivashchenko	2	0	0	0	0	0	0	0	0	2	0	0
	DF	(Ukraine)	Peter Komanda	2	0	0	0	0	0	0	0	0	2	0	0
	MF	(Ukraine)	Ihor Bobovych	2	0	0	0	0	0	0	0	0	2	0	0
	FW	(Ukraine)	Serhiy Datsenko	1	0	0	0	0	0	0	0	0	1	0	0
	DF	(Georgia (country))	Kakhaberi Sartania	1	0	0	0	0	0	0	0	0	1	0	0
	FW	(Ukraine)	Petro Pylypeyko	1	0	0	0	0	0	0	0	0	1	0	0
	GK	(Ukraine)	Oleksandr Mitko	1	0	0	0	0	0	0	0	0	1	0	0
	DF	(Ukraine)	Oleh Sobekh	1	0	0	0	0	0	0	0	0	1	0	0
	MF	(Ukraine)	Serhiy Melnichenko	1	0	0	0	0	0	0	0	0	1	0	0
	DF	(Ukraine)	Volodymyr Kolomiets	1	0	0	0	0	0	0	0	0	1	0	0
			Total	55	1	0	0	0	0	0	0	0	55	1	0

Last updated: 25 October 2026
