= 1994–95 FC Desna Chernihiv season =

FC Desna Chernihiv
1994–95 season
- President: Ivan Fedorets
- Manager: Andriy Protsko
- Stadium: Chernihiv Stadium
- Ukrainian Second League: 11th
- Ukrainian Cup: 1/32 finals
- Top goalscorer: League: Petro Pylypeyko, (10); All: Petro Pylypeyko, (10)
- Highest home attendance: 3800 (vs Chayka Sevastopol, 19 April 1995)
- Lowest home attendance: 100 (vs Garant Donetsk, 19 September 1994); 100 (vs Dynamo Luhansk, 22 September 1994)
- Biggest win: Chornomorets-2 Odesa 0-3 Desna Chernihiv; Desna Chernihiv 3-0 Druzhba Berdiansk
- Biggest defeat: Yavir Krasnopillia 3-0 Desna Chernihiv
Home colours	Away colours

For the 1994–95 season, FC Desna Chernihiv competed for the first time in the Ukrainian Second League.The club played its matches at the Chernihiv Stadium.

== Season summary ==
The club, which has just been relegated to the Ukrainian Second League, has confirmed Andriy Protsko as coach. During the summer transfer window Oleksandr Lepekho, Oleksandr Kormich, Peter Komanda and Oleh Ivashchenko arrive from Cheksyl Chernihiv. Defender Oleksandr Marek, midfielder Serhiy Zelinskyi and forwards Serhiy Datsenko and Petro Pylypeyko also arrive. Vladimir Drobot, Yuriy Cherezov, Igor Chetverik and Georgians Nikoloz Kheladze, David Rukhadze have left the club. In Ukrainian Cup, the club reached the round of 32; after defeating SBTS (Sumy), the club was eliminated by Systema-Boreks Borodianka.

== Players ==
=== Squad information ===
As of 26 October 2026

Squad no.	Name	Nationality	Position	Date of birth (age)
Goalkeepers
	Stanislav Tyulenev	(Kyrgyzstan)	GK	2 January 1973 (aged 21)
	Ihor Khimanych	(Ukraine)	GK	11 May 1966 (aged 28)
	Oleksandr Mitko	(Ukraine)	GK	3 August 1974 (aged 19)
	Oleksandr Stelmakh	(Ukraine)	GK	7 January 1976 (aged 18)
	Yuriy Melashenko	(Ukraine)	GK	21 April 1970 (aged 24)
Defenders
	Yuriy Nadtochiy (Captain)	(Ukraine)	DF	3 August 1964 (aged 29)
	Oleh Sobekh	(Ukraine)	DF	6 June 1976 (aged 18)
	Kakhaberi Sartania	(Georgia (country))	DF	8 August 1967 (aged 26)
	Oleh Ivashchenko	(Ukraine)	DF	5 May 1964 (aged 30)
	Volodymyr Kolomiets	(Ukraine)	DF	14 March 1974 (aged 20)
	Oleksandr Kormich	(Ukraine)	DF	2 October 1972 (aged 21)
	Andriy Kryvenok	(Ukraine)	DF	25 April 1967 (aged 27)
	Volodymyr Kulyk	(Ukraine)	DF	1 October 1969 (aged 24)
	Vadym Danylevskyi	(Ukraine)	DF	9 April 1972 (aged 22)
	Oleksandr Marek	(Ukraine)	DF	27 May 1972 (aged 22)
	Andrey Zakharov	(Ukraine)	DF	22 December 1968 (aged 25)
Midfielders
	Volodymyr Avramenko	(Ukraine)	MF	20 March 1974 (aged 20)
	Oleksandr Savenchuk	(Ukraine)	MF	9 May 1975 (aged 19)
	Ruslan Hilazyev	(Ukraine)	MF	7 January 1977 (aged 17)
	Ihor Bobovych	(Ukraine)	MF	18 November 1975 (aged 18)
	Serhiy Zelinskyi	(Ukraine)	MF	14 January 1972 (aged 22)
	Vladimir Drobot	(Ukraine)	MF	2 August 1972 (aged 21)
	Ihor Lyashenko	(Ukraine)	MF	27 August 1972 (aged 21)
	Anzor Kavteladze	(Georgia (country))	MF	22 June 1969 (aged 25)
Forwards
	Petro Pylypeyko	(Ukraine)	FW	1 June 1968 (aged 26)
	Serhiy Datsenko	(Ukraine)	FW	10 December 1977 (aged 16)
	Hennadiy Lahomyna	(Ukraine)	FW	9 September 1973 (aged 20)
	Gocha Gogokhia	(Georgia (country))	FW	22 June 1957 (aged 37)

== Transfers ==
=== In ===
Date	Pos.	Player	Age	Moving from	Type	Fee	Source
Summer
15 June 1994	DF	(Ukraine) Oleksandr Marek	20	(Ukraine) Shakhtar Stakhanov	Transfer	Free	
15 June 1994	DF	(Ukraine) Oleksandr Lepekho	20	(Ukraine) Cheksyl Chernihiv	Transfer	Free	
15 June 1994	DF	(Ukraine) Oleksandr Kormich	20	(Ukraine) Cheksyl Chernihiv	Transfer	Free	
15 June 1994	MF	(Ukraine) Serhiy Zelinskyi	20	(Ukraine) Krystal Kherson	Transfer	Free	
15 June 1994	MF	(Ukraine) Peter Komanda	20	(Ukraine) Cheksyl Chernihiv	Transfer	Free	
15 June 1994	MF	(Ukraine) Oleh Ivashchenko	20	(Ukraine) Cheksyl Chernihiv	Transfer	Free	
15 June 1994	FW	(Ukraine) Serhiy Datsenko	20	(Ukraine) Desna Chernihiv Academy	Transfer	Free	
15 June 1994	FW	(Ukraine) Petro Pylypeyko	20	Unattached	Transfer	Free	
Winter
15 January 1995	GK	(Kyrgyzstan) Stanislav Tyulenev	20	(Ukraine) Dnipro Cherkasy	Transfer	Free	
15 January 1995	DF	(Ukraine) Yuriy Denysiuk	20	(Ukraine) Dunay Izmail	Transfer	Free	
15 January 1995	DF	(Georgia (country)) Kakhaberi Sartania	20	(Ukraine) Vorskla Poltava	Transfer	Free	
15 January 1995	FW	(Ukraine) Hennadiy Lahomyna	20	(Ukraine) Silur Khartsyzsk	Transfer	Free	

=== Out ===
Date	Pos.	Player	Age	Moving to	Type	Fee	Source
Summer
16 June 1994	GK	(Georgia (country)) Nikoloz Kheladze	20	(Georgia (country)) Torpedo Kutaisi	Transfer	Free	
16 June 1994	DF	(Ukraine) Vladimir Drobot	20	(Ukraine) Cheksyl Chernihiv	Transfer	Free	
16 June 1994	DF	(Ukraine) Yuriy Cherezov	22	(Ukraine) Tekstylnyk Chernihiv	Transfer	Free	
16 June 1994	MF	(Georgia (country)) David Rukhadze	24	(Georgia (country)) Guria Lanchkhuti	Transfer	Free	
16 June 1994	MF	(Ukraine) Igor Chetverik	24	(Ukraine) Dnipro Cherkasy	Transfer	Free	
Winter
14 January 1995	GK	(Ukraine) Yuriy Melashenko	20	(Ukraine) Hirnyk Kryvyi Rih	Transfer	Free	
15 January 1995	GK	(Ukraine) Oleksandr Stelmakh	20	(Ukraine) Tekstylschyk Chernihiv	Transfer	Free	
15 January 1995	DF	(Ukraine) Yuriy Denysyuk	22	(Ukraine) Systema-Boreks Borodianka	Transfer	Free	
15 January 1995	DF	(Ukraine) Oleksandr Lepekho	20	(Ukraine) Tekstylschyk Chernihiv	Transfer	Free	

== Competitions ==
=== Overall ===
Competition	First match	Last match	Starting round	Final position	Record							
Competition	First match	Last match	Starting round	Final position	Pld	W	D	L	GF	GA	GD	Win %
Second League	5 August 1994	3 July 1995	Matchday 1	11th	42	17	7	18	44	43	+1	40.48
Cup	1 September 1994	5 September 1994	First preliminary round	Round of 32 (1/16)	2	1	0	1	2	2	+0	50.00
Total					44	18	7	19	46	45	+1	40.91

Last updated: 30 October 2026
Source: Competitions

=== Second League ===
==== League table ====
Pos	Team	Pld	W	D	L	GF	GA	GD	Pts	Promotion or relegation
1	Yavir Krasnopillia (C, P)	42	29	6	7	71	30	+41	93	Promoted to First League
2	FC Lviv (P)	42	30	3	9	73	39	+34	93	Promoted to First League
3	Dynamo Luhansk (D)	42	26	5	11	72	47	+25	83	Merged with Metalurh Mariupol
4	Dynamo Saky	42	25	5	12	62	33	+29	80	
5	Halychyna Drohobych	42	25	5	12	49	29	+20	80	
6	Titan Armyansk	42	22	10	10	68	36	+32	76	
7	Medita Shakhtarsk	42	22	8	12	57	36	+21	74	
8	Hazovyk Komarno	42	22	6	14	66	39	+27	72	
9	Meliorator Kakhovka	42	21	9	12	49	40	+9	72	
10	Druzhba Berdiansk	42	16	11	15	41	43	−2	59	
11	Desna Chernihiv	42	17	7	18	44	43	+1	58	
12	Azovets Mariupol	42	17	6	19	37	55	−18	57	
13	Chaika Sevastopol	42	16	8	18	42	45	−3	56	
14	Transimpeks-Ros Bila Tserkva	42	14	7	21	41	63	−22	49	
15	Artania Ochakiv (D)	42	13	8	21	30	58	−28	47	Merged with Olympiya FC
16	Sirius Kryvyi Rih (Note: Sirius Kryvyi Rih moved from Zhovti Vody in June 1995.) (D)	42	13	6	23	40	57	−17	45	Merged with Sportinvest Kryvyi Rih
17	Viktor Zaporizhzhia	42	12	6	24	54	60	−6	42	
18	Vodnyk Kherson	42	11	7	24	35	61	−26	40	
19	Okean Kerch (D)	42	11	5	26	42	67	−25	38	Withdrew
20	Shakhtar-2 Donetsk	42	10	7	25	37	71	−34	37	
21	Chornomorets-2 Odesa (D)	42	6	11	25	19	48	−29	29	Replaced with FC Dynamo-Dogma Odesa
22	Shakhtar Pavlohrad	42	5	12	25	33	62	−29	27	Avoided relegation

Source: uafootball.net.ua
(C) Champions; (D) Disqualified; (P) Promoted

=== Ukrainian Second League ===
5 August 1994 1	Desna Chernihiv	2–1	Transimpeks-Ros Bila Tserkva	Chernihiv
19:00 EEST (UTC+03:00)		Report		Stadium: Chernihiv Stadium; Attendance: 1500

8 August 1994 2	Desna Chernihiv	1–2	Lviv	Chernihiv
19:00 EEST (UTC+03:00)		Report		Stadium: Chernihiv Stadium; Attendance: 1500

13 August 1994 3	Yavir Krasnopillia	3–0	Desna Chernihiv	Krasnopillia
19:00 EEST (UTC+03:00)		Report		Stadium: Kolos Stadium; Attendance: 2000

25 August 1994 4	Hazovyk Komarno	2–0	Desna Chernihiv	Komarno
19:00 EEST (UTC+03:00)		Report		Stadium: Hazovyk Stadium; Attendance: 1000

28 August 1994 5	Halychyna Drohobych	2–0	Desna Chernihiv	Drohobych
19:00 EEST (UTC+03:00)		Report		Stadium: Kranivnyk Stadium; Attendance: 3000

11 September 1994 6	Desna Chernihiv	2–1	Viktor Zaporizhzhia	Chernihiv
19:00 EEST (UTC+03:00)		Report		Stadium: Chernihiv Stadium; Attendance: 1500

14 September 1994 7	Desna Chernihiv	0–0	Sirius Kryvyi Rih	Chernihiv
19:00 EEST (UTC+03:00)		Report		Stadium: Chernihiv Stadium; Attendance: 1500

19 September 1994 8	Garant Donetsk	0–0	Desna Chernihiv
19:00 EEST (UTC+03:00)		Report		Attendance: 100

22 September 1994 9	Dynamo Luhansk	2–1	Desna Chernihiv	Luhansk
19:00 EEST (UTC+03:00)		Report		Stadium: Avanhard Stadium (Luhansk)Avanhard Stadium; Attendance: 100

30 September 1994 10	Desna Chernihiv	0–1	Medita Shakhtarsk	Chernihiv
19:00 EEST (UTC+03:00)		Report		Stadium: Chernihiv Stadium; Attendance: 1000

3 October 1994 11	Desna Chernihiv	1–0	Shakhtar Pavlohrad	Chernihiv
19:00 EEST (UTC+03:00)		Report		Stadium: Chernihiv Stadium; Attendance: 1000

7 October 1994 12	Vodnyk Kherson	1–0	Desna Chernihiv	Kherson
19:00 EEST (UTC+03:00)		Report		Stadium: Krystal Stadium; Attendance: 1500

10 October 1994 13	Chornomorets-2 Odesa	0–3	Desna Chernihiv	Odesa
19:00 EEST (UTC+03:00)		Report		Stadium: SKA Stadium; Attendance: 500

16 October 1994 14	Desna Chernihiv	2–0	Meliorator Kakhovka	Chernihiv
19:00 EEST (UTC+03:00)		Report		Stadium: Chernihiv Stadium; Attendance: 1500

16 October 1994 15	Desna Chernihiv	2–0	Artania Ochakiv	Chernihiv
19:00 EEST (UTC+03:00)		Report		Stadium: Chernihiv Stadium; Attendance: 400

24 October 1994 16	Dynamo Saky	3–2	Desna Chernihiv	Saky
19:00 EEST (UTC+03:00)		Report		Stadium: Avanhard Stadium; Attendance: 4500

27 October 1994 17	Chaika Sevastopol	3–2	Desna Chernihiv	Sevastopol
19:00 EEST (UTC+03:00)		Report		Stadium: Chaika Stadium; Attendance: 1000

5 November 1994 18	Desna Chernihiv	1–0	Okean Kerch	Chernihiv
19:00 EEST (UTC+03:00)		Report		Stadium: Chernihiv Stadium; Attendance: 500

11 November 1994 19	Desna Chernihiv	0–2	Titan Armyansk	Chernihiv
19:00 EEST (UTC+03:00)		Report		Stadium: Chernihiv Stadium; Attendance: 1500

15 November 1994 20	Azovets Mariupol	2–0	Desna Chernihiv	Mariupol
19:00 EEST (UTC+03:00)		Report		Stadium: Azovstal Stadium; Attendance: 500

18 November 1994 21	Druzhba Berdiansk	1–1	Desna Chernihiv	Osypenko
19:00 EEST (UTC+03:00)		Report		Stadium: Druzhba Stadium; Attendance: 350

1 April 1995 22	Desna Chernihiv	3–0	Druzhba Berdiansk	Chernihiv
19:00 EEST (UTC+03:00)		Report		Stadium: Chernihiv Stadium; Attendance: 1500

4 April 1995 23	Desna Chernihiv	0–1	Azovets Mariupol	Chernihiv
19:00 EEST (UTC+03:00)		Report		Stadium: Chernihiv Stadium; Attendance: 1500

10 April 1995 24	Titan Armyansk	0–0	Desna Chernihiv	Armiansk
19:00 EEST (UTC+03:00)		Report		Stadium: Khimik Stadium; Attendance: 1500

13 April 1995 25	Okean Kerch	1–0	Desna Chernihiv	Kerch
19:00 EEST (UTC+03:00)		Report		Stadium: Stadium named after 50th anniversary of October; Attendance: 1500

19 April 1995 26	Desna Chernihiv	1–0	Chaika Sevastopol	Chernihiv
19:00 EEST (UTC+03:00)		Report		Stadium: Chernihiv Stadium; Attendance: 3800

22 April 1995 27	Desna Chernihiv	0–0	Dynamo Saky	Chernihiv
19:00 EEST (UTC+03:00)		Report		Stadium: Chernihiv Stadium; Attendance: 2000

27 April 1995 28	Artania Ochakiv	0–0	Desna Chernihiv	Ochakiv
19:00 EEST (UTC+03:00)		Report		Stadium: Artania Stadium; Attendance: 1000

30 April 1995 29	Meliorator Kakhovka	2–0	Desna Chernihiv	Kakhovka
19:00 EEST (UTC+03:00)		Report		Stadium: Olympic Stadium; Attendance: 2000

7 May 1995 30	Desna Chernihiv	2–0	Chornomorets-2 Odesa	Chernihiv
19:00 EEST (UTC+03:00)		Report		Stadium: Chernihiv Stadium; Attendance: 3000

10 May 1995 31	Desna Chernihiv	2–0	Vodnyk Kherson	Chernihiv
19:00 EEST (UTC+03:00)		Report		Stadium: Chernihiv Stadium; Attendance: 1000

15 May 1995 32	Shakhtar Pavlohrad	0–1	Desna Chernihiv	Pavlohrad
19:00 EEST (UTC+03:00)		Report		Stadium: Hirnyk Stadium; Attendance: 2000

18 May 1995 33	Shakhtar Pavlohrad	1–1	Desna Chernihiv	Khrestivka
19:00 EEST (UTC+03:00)		Report		Stadium: Yuvileinyi Stadium; Attendance: 1000

26 May 1995 34	Desna Chernihiv	2–1	Dynamo Luhansk	Chernihiv
19:00 EEST (UTC+03:00)		Report		Stadium: Chernihiv Stadium; Attendance: 3000

29 May 1995 35	Desna Chernihiv	2–1	Shakhtar-2 Donetsk	Chernihiv
19:00 EEST (UTC+03:00)		Report		Stadium: Chernihiv Stadium; Attendance: 2000

4 June 1995 36	Sirius Kryvyi Rih	1–0	Desna Chernihiv	Kryvyi Rih
19:00 EEST (UTC+03:00)		Report		Stadium: Sukhaya Balka; Attendance: 300

13 June 1995 37	Desna Chernihiv	0–2	Halychyna Drohobych	Chernihiv
19:00 EEST (UTC+03:00)		Report		Stadium: Chernihiv Stadium; Attendance: 2000

16 June 1995 38	Desna Chernihiv	3–1	Hazovyk Komarno	Chernihiv
19:00 EEST (UTC+03:00)		Report		Stadium: Chernihiv Stadium; Attendance: 2000

25 June 1995 39	Desna Chernihiv	0–1	Yavir Krasnopillia	Chernihiv
19:00 EEST (UTC+03:00)		Report		Stadium: Chernihiv Stadium; Attendance: 2500

30 June 1995 40	FC Lviv	3–1	Desna Chernihiv	Lviv
19:00 EEST (UTC+03:00)		Report		Stadium: Yunist Stadium; Attendance: 2000

3 July 1995 41	Transimpeks-Ros Bila Tserkva	2–3	Desna Chernihiv	Bila Tserkva
19:00 EEST (UTC+03:00)		Report		Stadium: Trudovi Reservy Stadium; Attendance: 1000

=== Ukrainian Cup ===
1 September 1994 Round of 128 (1/64)	Desna Chernihiv	2–1	SBTS (Sumy)	Chernihiv
17:00 EEST (UTC+03:00)		Report		Stadium: Chernihiv Stadium; Attendance: 1500

5 September 1994 Round of 64 (1/32)	Systema-Boreks Borodianka	1–0	Desna Chernihiv	Borodianka
17:00 EEST (UTC+03:00)		Report		Stadium: Stadium Borex; Attendance: 2500

== Statistics ==
=== Appearances and goals ===
No.	Pos	Nat	Player	Total		Ukrainian Second League		Ukrainian Cup		Play-offs	
No.	Pos	Nat	Player	Apps	Goals	Apps	Goals	Apps	Goals	Apps	Goals
Goalkeepers
	GK	(Ukraine) UKR	Ihor Khimanych	15	0	15	0	0	0	0	0
	GK	(Ukraine) UKR	Oleksandr Mitko	2	0	2	0	0	0	0	0
	GK	(Ukraine) UKR	Oleksandr Kuzmik	2	0	2	0	0	0	0	0
	GK	(Kyrgyzstan) KGZ	Stanislav Tyulenev	3	0	3	0	0	0	0	0
Defenders
	DF	(Ukraine) UKR	Yuriy Rohovyi	24	2	22	1	2	1	0	0
	DF	(Ukraine) UKR	Yaroslav Martsynkyv	2	0	2	0	0	0	0	0
	DF	(Ukraine) UKR	Ihor Pakhar	20	0	19	0	1	0	0	0
	DF	(Ukraine) UKR	Yuriy Nadtochiy	42	1	40	1	2	0	0	0
	DF	(Ukraine) UKR	Oleh Sobekh	41	1	40	1	1	0	0	0
	DF	(Ukraine) UKR	Petro Komanda	42	0	40	0	2	0	0	0
	DF	(Ukraine) UKR	Oleksandr Marek	29	2	27	2	2	0	0	0
	DF	(Ukraine) UKR	Anatoliy Havrilovskyi	11	0	11	0	0	0	0	0
	DF	(Georgia (country)) GEO	Kakhaberi Sartania	6	1	5	0	1	1	0	0
	DF	(Ukraine) UKR	Oleh Ivashchenko	41	3	39	3	2	0	0	0
	DF	(Ukraine) UKR	Oleksandr Kormich	16	2	16	2	0	0	0	0
	DF	(Ukraine) UKR	Andriy Kryvenok	27	2	25	2	2	0	0	0
	DF	(Ukraine) UKR	Yuriy Esaulov	1	0	1	0	0	0	0	0
	DF	(Ukraine) UKR	Volodymyr Kulyk	36	2	34	2	2	0	0	0
	DF	(Ukraine) UKR	Ihor Zhornyak	2	0	2	0	0	0	0	0
Midfielders
	MF	(Ukraine) UKR	Volodymyr Avramenko	18	1	18	1	0	0	0	0
	MF	(Georgia (country)) GEO	Anzor Kavteladze	6	1	5	1	1	0	0	0
	MF	(Ukraine) UKR	Serhiy Zelinskyi	17	5	17	5	0	0	0	0
	MF	(Ukraine) UKR	Ihor Bobovych	40	5	39	5	1	0	0	0
	MF	(Ukraine) UKR	Oleksandr Savenchuk	21	2	21	2	0	0	0	0
	MF	(Ukraine) UKR	Vladimir Drobot	33	1	33	1	0	0	0	0
Forwards
	FW	(Ukraine) UKR	Petro Pylypeyko	39	15	37	15	2	0	0	0
	FW	(Ukraine) UKR	Serhiy Datsenko	13	3	13	3	0	0	0	0
	FW	(Ukraine) UKR	Hennadiy Lahomyna	13	0	13	0	0	0	0	0
	FW	(Georgia (country)) GEO	Gocha Gogokhia	16	1	14	1	2	0	0	0
Players transferred out during the season
	GK	(Ukraine) UKR	Yuriy Melashenko	5	0	5	0	0	0	0	0
	GK	(Ukraine) UKR	Oleksandr Stelmakh	20	0	18	0	2	0	0	0
	DF	(Ukraine) UKR	Yuriy Denysiuk	3	0	3	0	0	0	0	0
	DF	(Ukraine) UKR	Oleksandr Lepekho	14	0	12	0	2	0	0	0

Source: Competitions

Last updated: 26 October 2026

=== Clean sheets ===
Rank	No.	Pos	Nat	Name	Ukrainian First League	Ukrainian Cup	Play-offs	Total
1		GK	(Ukraine)	Ihor Khimanych	8	0	0	8
2		GK	(Ukraine)	Oleksandr Stelmakh	7	0	0	7
3		GK	(Ukraine)	Yuriy Melashenko	1	0	0	1
4		GK	(Ukraine)	Oleksandr Kuzmik	1	0	0	1
				Total	17	0	0	17

Last updated: 26 October 2026

=== Disciplinary record ===
No.	Pos	Nat	Player	Second League			Ukrainian Cup			Play-offs			Total		
No.	Pos	Nat	Player	Yellow card	(yellow card) (yellow-red card)	Red card	Yellow card	(yellow card) (yellow-red card)	Red card	Yellow card	(yellow card) (yellow-red card)	Red card	Yellow card	(yellow card) (yellow-red card)	Red card
	DF	(Ukraine)	Oleh Sobekh	4	0	0	0	0	0	0	0	0	4	0	0
	DF	(Ukraine)	Volodymyr Kulyk	4	0	0	0	0	0	0	0	0	4	0	0
	DF	(Ukraine)	Oleksandr Marek	3	0	0	0	0	0	0	0	0	3	0	0
	MF	(Ukraine)	Ihor Bobovych	3	0	0	0	0	0	0	0	0	3	0	0
	DF	(Ukraine)	Petro Komanda	3	0	0	0	0	0	0	0	0	3	0	0
	MF	(Ukraine)	Vladimir Drobot	3	0	0	0	0	0	0	0	0	3	0	0
	FW	(Ukraine)	Petro Pylypeyko	3	0	0	0	0	0	0	0	0	3	0	0
	MF	(Ukraine)	Serhiy Zelinskyi	3	0	0	0	0	0	0	0	0	3	0	0
	DF	(Ukraine)	Andriy Kryvenok	3	0	0	0	0	0	0	0	0	3	0	0
	DF	(Ukraine)	Oleksandr Lepekho	2	0	0	1	0	0	0	0	0	3	0	0
	DF	(Ukraine)	Anatoliy Havrilovskyi	2	0	0	0	0	0	0	0	0	2	0	0
	DF	(Ukraine)	Yuriy Nadtochiy	2	0	0	0	0	0	0	0	0	2	0	0
	DF	(Ukraine)	Oleh Ivashchenko	2	0	0	0	0	0	0	0	0	2	0	0
	DF	(Ukraine)	Ihor Pakhar	1	0	0	1	0	0	0	0	0	2	0	0
	MF	(Georgia (country))	Anzor Kavteladze	1	0	0	0	0	0	0	0	0	1	0	0
	DF	(Ukraine)	Yuriy Esaulov	1	0	0	0	0	0	0	0	0	1	0	0
	DF	(Ukraine)	Ihor Zhornyak	1	0	0	0	0	0	0	0	0	1	0	0
	MF	(Ukraine)	Volodymyr Avramenko	1	0	0	0	0	0	0	0	0	1	0	0
	GK	(Ukraine)	Oleksandr Mitko	1	0	0	0	0	0	0	0	0	1	0	0
	GK	(Ukraine)	Ihor Khimanych	1	0	0	0	0	0	0	0	0	1	0	0
	FW	(Ukraine)	Serhiy Datsenko	1	0	0	0	0	0	0	0	0	1	0	0
	FW	(Ukraine)	Hennadiy Lahomyna	1	0	0	0	0	0	0	0	0	1	0	0
			Total	46	0	0	2	0	0	0	0	0	48	0	0

Last updated: 26 October 2026
