= 1996–97 FC Desna Chernihiv season =

FC Desna Chernihiv
1996–97 season
- President: Ivan Fedorets
- Manager: Yukhym Shkolnykov
- Stadium: Chernihiv Stadium
- Ukrainian Second League: 1st (champions)
- Ukrainian Cup: Round of 32 (1/16)
- Top goalscorer: League: Petro Pylypeyko (8); All: Petro Pylypeyko (8)
- Highest home attendance: 60000 (vs Khutrovyk Tysmenytsia, 21 May 1997)
- Lowest home attendance: 400 (vs Ros Bila Tserkva, 11 November 1996)
- Biggest win: Desna Chernihiv 4-0 Pokuttia Kolomyia
- Biggest defeat: Pokuttia Kolomyia 2-0 Desna Chernihiv
Home colours	Away colours

For the 1996–97 season, FC Desna Chernihiv competed in the Ukrainian Second League. Desna Chernihiv participated also in this season's editions of the Ukrainian Cup. The club played its matches at the Chernihiv Stadium.

== Season summary ==
As coach was appointed Yukhym Shkolnykov. During the summer transfers, club signed some players such as such as Yuriy Ovcharov, Dmytro Romanenko, Viktor Rudyi, Serhiy Sapronov, Vadim Danilevskiy, Ruslan Hilazyev, Yuriy Ovcharenko, Serhiy Zgura, Andriy Borysyuk and Hennadiy Lahomyna. The experienced coach did not make many rash moves. Every player was given the opportunity to prove their worth and earn a spot on the team, through an intensive selection process. In particular, the forward Yuriy Ovcharenko has reached his best form. At the end of the season, the club won the Ukrainian Second League in group A, ahead of Fakel Varva, finishing with 66 points from 20 wins, 6 draws, and 4 defeats.

== Players ==
=== Squad information ===
As of 22 October 2026

Squad no.	Name	Nationality	Position	Date of birth (age)
Goalkeepers
	Yuriy Ovcharov	(Ukraine)	GK	19 March 1966 (aged 30)
	Ihor Khimanych	(Ukraine)	GK	11 May 1966 (aged 30)
	Oleksandr Mitko	(Ukraine)	GK	3 August 1974 (aged 21)
Defenders
	Yuriy Nadtochiy	(Ukraine)	DF	3 August 1964 (aged 31)
	Oleh Sobekh	(Ukraine)	DF	6 June 1976 (aged 20)
	Yaroslav Zayats	(Ukraine)	DF	8 December 1960 (aged 35)
	Kakhaberi Sartania	(Georgia (country))	DF	8 August 1967 (aged 28)
	Viktor Rudyi	(Ukraine)	DF	11 February 1962 (aged 34)
	Serhiy Sapronov	(Ukraine)	DF	21 October 1961 (aged 34)
	Oleh Ivashchenko	(Ukraine)	DF	5 May 1964 (aged 32)
	Volodymyr Kolomiets	(Ukraine)	DF	14 March 1974 (aged 22)
	Oleksandr Kormich	(Ukraine)	DF	2 October 1972 (aged 23)
	Andriy Kryvenok	(Ukraine)	DF	25 April 1967 (aged 29)
	Volodymyr Kulyk	(Ukraine)	DF	1 October 1969 (aged 26)
	Vadym Danylevskyi	(Ukraine)	DF	9 April 1972 (aged 24)
Midfielders
	Volodymyr Avramenko	(Ukraine)	MF	20 March 1974 (aged 22)
	Oleksandr Savenchuk	(Ukraine)	MF	9 May 1975 (aged 21)
	Ruslan Hilazyev	(Ukraine)	MF	7 January 1977 (aged 19)
	Ihor Bobovych	(Ukraine)	MF	18 November 1975 (aged 20)
	Serhiy Zelinskyi	(Ukraine)	MF	14 January 1972 (aged 24)
	Vladimir Drobot	(Ukraine)	MF	2 August 1972 (aged 23)
	Ihor Lyashenko	(Ukraine)	MF	27 August 1972 (aged 23)
Forwards
	Serhiy Zghura	(Ukraine)	FW	3 November 1977 (aged 18)
	Andriy Borysyuk	(Ukraine)	FW	29 July 1975 (aged 20)
	Yuriy Ovcharenko	(Ukraine)	FW	25 April 1968 (aged 28)
	Petro Pylypeyko	(Ukraine)	FW	1 June 1968 (aged 28)

== Transfers ==
=== In ===
Date	Pos.	Player	Age	Moving from	Type	Fee	Source
Summer
15 June 1996	GK	(Ukraine) Yuriy Ovcharov	20	(Ukraine) Zirka Kropyvnytskyi	Transfer	Free	
15 June 1996	DF	(Ukraine) Dmytro Romanenko	20	(Ukraine) Slavutych	Transfer	Free	
15 June 1996	DF	(Ukraine) Viktor Rudyi	20	(Ukraine) Ros Bila Tserkva	Transfer	Free	
15 June 1996	DF	(Ukraine) Serhiy Sapronov	20	(Ukraine) Bukovyna Chernivtsi	Transfer	Free	
15 June 1996	MF	(Ukraine) Vadim Danilevskiy	20	(Ukraine) Tekstylschyk Chernihiv	Transfer	Free	
15 June 1996	MF	(Ukraine) Ruslan Hilazyev	20	(Ukraine) Dynamo-Flesh Odesa	Transfer	Free	
15 June 1996	FW	(Ukraine) Yuriy Ovcharenko	20	(Ukraine) Ros Bila Tserkva	Transfer	Free	
15 June 1996	FW	(Ukraine) Serhiy Zgura	20	(Ukraine) Naftokhimik Kremenchuk	Transfer	Free	
15 June 1996	FW	(Ukraine) Andriy Borysyuk	20	(Ukraine) Nyva Vinnytsia	Transfer	Free	
15 June 1996	FW	(Ukraine) Hennadiy Lahomyna	20	(Russia) Industriya Borovsk	Transfer	Free	
15 June 1996	DF	(Ukraine) Peter Komanda	20	(Ukraine) Domostroitel Chernihiv	Transfer	Free	
Winter
15 June 1997	DF	(Ukraine) Yaroslav Zaiats	20	(Ukraine) Bukovyna Chernivtsi	Transfer	Free	

=== Out ===
Date	Pos.	Player	Age	Moving to	Type	Fee	Source
Winter
7 January 1997	DF	(Ukraine) Yuriy Nadtochiy	20	(Belarus) Gomel	Transfer	Free	

== Competitions ==
=== Overall ===
Competition	First match	Last match	Starting round	Final position	Record							
Competition	First match	Last match	Starting round	Final position	Pld	W	D	L	GF	GA	GD	Win %
Ukrainian Second League	10 October 1996	10 June 1997	Matchday 1	Winner	30	20	6	4	39	12	+27	66.67
Ukrainian Cup	28 August 1996	28 August 1996	First preliminary round	Round of 64 (1/32)	1	1	0	0	1	0	+1	100.00
Total					31	21	6	4	40	12	+28	67.74

Last updated: 15 May 1997
Source: Competitions

=== Ukrainian Second League ===
10 August 2026 1	Desna Chernihiv	0–0	Papirnyk Malyn	Chernihiv
19:00 EEST (UTC+03:00)		Report		Stadium: Chernihiv Stadium; Attendance: 2000

18 August 2026 2	Pokuttia Kolomyia	3–0	Desna Chernihiv	Kolomyia
19:00 EEST (UTC+03:00)		Report		Stadium: Yunost Stadium; Attendance: 5000

24 August 2026 3	Desna Chernihiv	0–1	Fakel Varva	Chernihiv
19:00 EEST (UTC+03:00)		Report		Stadium: Chernihiv Stadium; Attendance: 3000

1 September 2026 4	Tysmenytsia	0–0	Desna Chernihiv	Tysmenytsia
19:00 EEST (UTC+03:00)		Report		Attendance: 2000

9 September 1996 5	Desna Chernihiv	1–0	Papirnyk Malyn	Chernihiv
19:00 EEST (UTC+03:00)		Report		Stadium: Chernihiv Stadium; Attendance: 2000

14 September 2026 6	Kalush	0–1	Desna Chernihiv	Kalush
19:00 EEST (UTC+03:00)		Report		Stadium: Khimik Stadium; Attendance: 3500

22 September 1996 7	Desna Chernihiv	3–1	Nyva Bershad	Chernihiv
19:00 EEST (UTC+03:00)		Report		Stadium: Chernihiv Stadium; Attendance: 600

28 September 1996 8	Desna Chernihiv	1–0	Haray Zhovkva	Chernihiv
19:00 EEST (UTC+03:00)		Report		Stadium: Chernihiv Stadium; Attendance: 1500

6 October 2026 9	Systema-Boreks Borodianka	2–1	Desna Chernihiv	Borodianka
19:00 EEST (UTC+03:00)		Report		Stadium: Stadium Sistema; Attendance: 700

12 October 2026 10	Desna Chernihiv	0–0	Hazovyk Komarno	Chernihiv
19:00 EEST (UTC+03:00)		Report		Stadium: Chernihiv Stadium; Attendance: 2000

19 October 2026 11	Karpaty Mukacheve	3–0	Desna Chernihiv	Mukachevo
19:00 EEST (UTC+03:00)		Report		Stadium: Pryboryst Stadium; Attendance: 2000

27 October 2026 12	Desna Chernihiv	2–0	Keramik Baranivka	Chernihiv
19:00 EEST (UTC+03:00)		Report		Stadium: Chernihiv Stadium; Attendance: 2000

1 November 1996 13	Halychyna Drohobych	0–0	Desna Chernihiv	Dobrich
19:00 EEST (UTC+03:00)		Report		Stadium: Stadion Druzhba; Attendance: 500

6 November 2026 14	Desna Chernihiv	3–0	Nerafa Slavutych	Chernihiv
19:00 EEST (UTC+03:00)		Report		Stadium: Chernihiv Stadium; Attendance: 2000

11 November 1996 15	Ros Bila Tserkva	1–2	Desna Chernihiv	Bila Tserkva
19:00 EEST (UTC+03:00)		Report		Stadium: Trudovi Rezervy Stadium; Attendance: 400

16 March 1997 16	Desna Chernihiv	2–0	Ros Bila Tserkva	Chernihiv
19:00 EEST (UTC+03:00)		Report		Stadium: Chernihiv Stadium; Attendance: 2500

22 March 1997 17	Nerafa Slavutych	0–2	Desna Chernihiv	Slavutych
19:00 EEST (UTC+03:00)		Report		Stadium: Stadium Dynamovets; Attendance: 2000

18 March 1997 18	Desna Chernihiv	1–0	Halychyna Drohobych	Chernihiv
19:00 EEST (UTC+03:00)		Report		Stadium: Chernihiv Stadium; Attendance: 1500

5 April 1997 19	Keramik Baranivka	x–x	Desna Chernihiv
19:00 EEST (UTC+03:00)		Report

13 April 1997 20	Desna Chernihiv	3–0	Karpaty Mukacheve	Chernihiv
19:00 EEST (UTC+03:00)		Report		Stadium: Chernihiv Stadium; Attendance: 5000

19 April 1997 21	Hazovyk Komarno	0–1	Desna Chernihiv	Komarno
19:00 EEST (UTC+03:00)		Report		Stadium: Stadium Gazovik; Attendance: 1000

24 April 1997 22	Desna Chernihiv	2–0	Systema-Boreks Borodianka	Chernihiv
19:00 EEST (UTC+03:00)		Report		Stadium: Chernihiv Stadium; Attendance: 2000

29 April 1997 23	Haray Zhovkva	0–2	Desna Chernihiv	Zhovkva
19:00 EEST (UTC+03:00)		Report		Stadium: Stadium Raztochye; Attendance: 1500

4 May 1997 24	Nyva Bershad	0–0	Desna Chernihiv	Bershad
19:00 EEST (UTC+03:00)		Report		Stadium: Kolos Stadium; Attendance: 2500

10 May 1997 25	Desna Chernihiv	2–0	Kalush	Chernihiv
19:00 EEST (UTC+03:00)		Report		Stadium: Chernihiv Stadium; Attendance: 5000

15 May 1997 26	Obolon-PPO Kyiv	0–0	Desna Chernihiv	Kiev
19:00 EEST (UTC+03:00)		Report		Stadium: Stadium Zmina; Attendance: 1000

21 May 1997 27	Desna Chernihiv	3–1	Tysmenytsia	Chernihiv
19:00 EEST (UTC+03:00)		Report		Stadium: Chernihiv Stadium; Attendance: 6000

26 May 1997 28	Fakel Varva	0–1	Desna Chernihiv	Varva
19:00 EEST (UTC+03:00)		Report		Stadium: Yunist Stadium; Attendance: 5000

5 June 1997 29	Desna Chernihiv	4–0	Pokuttia Kolomyia	Chernihiv
19:00 EEST (UTC+03:00)		Report		Stadium: Chernihiv Stadium; Attendance: 4500

10 June 2026 28	Papirnyk Malyn	0–2	Desna Chernihiv	Malyn
19:00 EEST (UTC+03:00)		Report		Stadium: Central Stadium Avangard; Attendance: 2000

=== Ukrainian Cup ===
28 August 1996 Round of 64 (1st stage)	Fakel Varva	0–1	Desna Chernihiv	Hrebinka
17:00 EEST (UTC+03:00)		Report		Stadium: Lokomotyv Stadium; Attendance: 800

18 September 1996 Round of 64 (2nd stage)	Desna Chernihiv	x–x	Fakel Varva	Chernihiv
17:00 EEST (UTC+03:00)		Report		Stadium: Chernihiv Stadium; Attendance: 2000

== Statistics ==
=== Appearances and goals ===
No.	Pos	Nat	Player	Total		Ukrainian Second League		Ukrainian Cup		Play-offs	
No.	Pos	Nat	Player	Apps	Goals	Apps	Goals	Apps	Goals	Apps	Goals
Goalkeepers
	GK	(Ukraine) UKR	Yuriy Ovcharov	14	0	14	0	0	0	0	0
	GK	(Ukraine) UKR	Ihor Khimanych	14	0	13	0	1	0	0	0
	GK	(Ukraine) UKR	Oleksandr Mitko	4	0	4	0	0	0	0	0
Defenders
	DF	(Ukraine) UKR	Oleh Sobekh	18	1	17	1	1	0	0	0
	DF	(Ukraine) UKR	Yaroslav Zayats	9	0	9	0	0	0	0	0
	DF	(Georgia (country)) GEO	Kakhaberi Sartania	28	0	27	0	1	0	0	0
	DF	(Ukraine) UKR	Viktor Rudyi	6	1	6	1	0	0	0	0
	DF	(Ukraine) UKR	Serhiy Sapronov	25	0	24	0	1	0	0	0
	DF	(Ukraine) UKR	Oleh Ivashchenko	34	0	33	0	1	0	0	0
	DF	(Ukraine) UKR	Volodymyr Kolomiets	28	2	27	2	1	0	0	0
	DF	(Ukraine) UKR	Oleksandr Kormich	2	0	2	0	0	0	0	0
	DF	(Ukraine) UKR	Andriy Kryvenok	13	1	12	0	1	1	0	0
	DF	(Ukraine) UKR	Volodymyr Kulyk	23	1	22	1	1	0	0	0
	DF	(Ukraine) UKR	Vadym Danylevskyi	1	0	1	0	0	0	0	0
Midfielders
	MF	(Ukraine) UKR	Volodymyr Avramenko	14	1	13	1	1	0	0	0
	MF	(Ukraine) UKR	Oleksandr Savenchuk	19	0	19	0	0	0	0	0
	MF	(Ukraine) UKR	Ruslan Hilazyev	14	1	14	1	0	0	0	0
	MF	(Ukraine) UKR	Ihor Bobovych	28	4	27	4	1	0	0	0
	MF	(Ukraine) UKR	Serhiy Zelinskyi	11	4	11	4	0	0	0	0
	MF	(Ukraine) UKR	Vladimir Drobot	21	2	20	2	1	0	0	0
	MF	(Ukraine) UKR	Ihor Lyashenko	28	3	27	3	1	0	0	0
Forwards
	FW	(Ukraine) UKR	Serhiy Zghura	13	0	13	0	0	0	0	0
	FW	(Ukraine) UKR	Andriy Borysyuk	9	0	9	0	0	0	0	0
	FW	(Ukraine) UKR	Yuriy Ovcharenko	17	0	17	0	0	0	0	0
	FW	(Ukraine) UKR	Petro Pylypeyko	28	8	27	8	1	0	0	0
Players transferred out during the season
	DF	(Ukraine) UKR	Yuriy Nadtochiy	15	0	14	0	1	0	0	0

Source: Competitions

Last updated: 22 October 2026

=== Goalscorers ===
Rank	No.	Pos	Nat	Name	Ukrainian Second League	Ukrainian Cup	Play-offs	Total
1		FW	(Ukraine)	Petro Pylypeyko	8	0	0	8
2		MF	(Ukraine)	Ihor Bobovych	4	0	0	4
2		MF	(Ukraine)	Serhiy Zelinskyi	4	0	0	4
3		MF	(Ukraine)	Ihor Lyashenko	3	0	0	3
4		DF	(Ukraine)	Volodymyr Kolomiets	2	0	0	2
4		MF	(Ukraine)	Vladimir Drobot	2	0	0	2
5		DF	(Ukraine)	Oleh Sobekh	1	0	0	1
5		DF	(Ukraine)	Viktor Rudyi	1	0	0	1
5		MF	(Ukraine)	Volodymyr Avramenko	1	0	0	1
5		MF	(Ukraine)	Ruslan Hilazyev	1	0	0	1'
5		DF	(Ukraine)	Volodymyr Kulyk	1	0	0	1
6		DF	(Ukraine)	Andriy Kryvenok	0	1	0	1
				Total	28	1	0	29

Last updated: 31 May 2019

=== Clean sheets ===
Rank	No.	Pos	Nat	Name	Ukrainian First League	Ukrainian Cup	Play-offs	Total
1		GK	(Ukraine)	Yuriy Ovcharov	13	0	0	13
2		GK	(Ukraine)	Ihor Khimanych	7	1	0	8
3		GK	(Ukraine)	Oleksandr Mitko	3	0	0	3
				Total	23	1	0	24

Last updated: 21 October 2026

=== Disciplinary record ===
No.	Pos	Nat	Player	Second League			Ukrainian Cup			Play-offs			Total		
No.	Pos	Nat	Player	Yellow card	(yellow card) (yellow-red card)	Red card	Yellow card	(yellow card) (yellow-red card)	Red card	Yellow card	(yellow card) (yellow-red card)	Red card	Yellow card	(yellow card) (yellow-red card)	Red card
	DF	(Ukraine)	Serhiy Sapronov	5	0	0	0	0	0	0	0	0	5	0	0
	MF	(Ukraine)	Vladimir Drobot	2	0	0	1	0	0	0	0	0	3	0	0
	DF	(Ukraine)	Yuriy Nadtochiy	2	0	0	0	0	0	0	0	0	2	0	0
	MF	(Ukraine)	Serhiy Zghura	2	0	0	0	0	0	0	0	0	2	0	0
	DF	(Georgia (country))	Kakhaberi Sartania	2	0	0	0	0	0	0	0	0	2	0	0
	DF	(Ukraine)	Oleh Ivashchenko	1	0	0	0	0	0	0	0	0	1	0	0
	DF	(Ukraine)	Volodymyr Kolomiets	1	0	0	0	0	0	0	0	0	1	0	0
	MF	(Ukraine)	Serhiy Zelinskyi	1	0	0	0	0	0	0	0	0	1	0	0
	MF	(Ukraine)	Ruslan Hilazyev	1	0	0	0	0	0	0	0	0	1	0	0
	MF	(Ukraine)	Ihor Lyashenko	1	0	0	0	0	0	0	0	0	1	0	0
	FW	(Ukraine)	Yuriy Ovcharenko	1	0	0	0	0	0	0	0	0	1	0	0
	GK	(Ukraine)	Yuriy Ovcharov	1	0	0	0	0	0	0	0	0	1	0	0
	DF	(Ukraine)	Yaroslav Zayats	1	0	0	0	0	0	0	0	0	1	0	0
	DF	(Ukraine)	Volodymyr Kulyk	0	0	0	1	0	0	0	0	0	1	0	0
	MF	(Ukraine)	Ihor Bobovych	0	0	0	1	0	0	0	0	0	1	0	0
			Total	21	0	0	3	0	0	0	0	0	24	0	0

Last updated: 21 October 2026
