= 1995–96 in Ukrainian football =

The 1995–96 season was the fourth season of competitive football in Ukraine.

== National team ==
6 September 1995 UEFA Euro 1996 qualifying	Lithuania	1–3	Ukraine	Vilnius, Lithuania
	Sukristov (yellow card) 10'; Maciulevičius 17'	Report	Kalitvintsev (yellow card) 4'; Horilyi (yellow card) 53'; Huseinov 66', 70'; Holovko (yellow card) 81'; Husin 83'	Stadium: Zalgiris Stadium; Attendance: 6,000; Referee: Brendan Shorte (Ireland)

11 October 1995 UEFA Euro 1996 qualifying	Slovenia	3–2	Ukraine	Ljubljana, Slovenia
	Udovič (yellow card) 33'; Milanič (yellow card) 48'; Udovic 50', 90'; Zahovic 73'; Galič (yellow card) 74'	Report	Zhabchenko (red card) 16'; Skrypnyk (yellow card) 21'; Skrypnyk 23'; Huseinov 44'; Holovko (yellow card) 45'; Nahornyak (yellow card) 80'	Stadium: Stadion za Bežigradom; Attendance: 2,750; Referee: Alain Hammer (Luxembourg)

11 November 1995 UEFA Euro 1996 qualifying	Italy	3–1	Ukraine	Bari, Italy
	Ravanelli 21', 49'; Baggio (yellow card) 32'; Maldini 53'; Crippa (yellow card) 70'	Report	Bezhenar (yellow card) 11'; Polunin 19'; Luzhnyi (yellow card) 57'	Stadium: Stadio San Nicola; Attendance: 43,999; Referee: Serge Muhmenthaler (Switzerland)

9 April 1996 Friendly	Moldova	2–2	Ukraine	Chişinău, Moldova
17:00 (UTC+03:00)	Testemitanu 72'; Popovici 83'	Report	Huseinov 49', 66'	Stadium: Stadionul Republican; Attendance: 7,000; Referee: Vadim Zhuk (Belarus)

1 May 1996 Friendly	Turkey	3–2	Ukraine	Samsun, Turkey
20:00 (UTC+03:00)	Şükür 7'; Yiğit 13'; Kerimoğlu 32'	Report	Shevchenko 10'; Huseinov 34'	Stadium: 19 Mayıs Stadium; Attendance: 18,000; Referee: Otar Guntadze (Georgia)

== Premier League ==
=== League table ===
Pos	Team	Pld	W	D	L	GF	GA	GD	Pts	Qualification or relegation
1	Dynamo Kyiv (Note: Participant of the 1996 Ukrainian Cup Final) (C)	34	24	7	3	65	17	+48	79	Qualification to Champions League qualifying round
2	Chornomorets Odesa	34	22	7	5	56	25	+31	73	Qualification to UEFA Cup second qualifying round
3	Dnipro Dnipropetrovsk	34	19	6	9	65	34	+31	63	
4	CSKA-Borysfen Kyiv	34	15	11	8	47	27	+20	56	
5	Metalurh Zaporizhzhia	34	16	4	14	49	42	+7	52	
6	Zirka-NIBAS Kirovohrad	34	14	8	12	37	33	+4	50	
7	Torpedo Zaporizhzhia	34	15	3	16	40	46	−6	48	
8	Karpaty Lviv	34	12	10	12	39	39	0	46	
9	Kremin Kremenchuk	34	14	4	16	46	56	−10	46	
10	Shakhtar Donetsk	34	13	6	15	44	43	+1	45	Qualification to Intertoto Cup group stage
11	Prykarpattya Ivano-Frankivsk	34	12	8	14	49	49	0	44	
12	Tavriya Simferopol	34	12	8	14	46	46	0	44	
13	Nyva Ternopil	34	13	3	18	37	42	−5	42	
14	Kryvbas Kryvyi Rih	34	11	9	14	43	52	−9	42	
15	Nyva Vinnytsia	34	11	7	16	28	36	−8	40	Qualification to Cup Winners' Cup qualifying round
16	SC Mykolaiv (R)	34	10	8	16	37	53	−16	38	Relegated to Ukrainian First League
17	Volyn Lutsk (R)	34	9	7	18	34	58	−24	34	Relegated to Ukrainian First League
18	Zorya Luhansk (R)	34	4	4	26	16	80	−64	16	Relegated to Ukrainian First League

Source: uafootball.net.ua
Rules for classification: 1st points; 2nd goal difference; 3rd goal scored
(C) Champions; (R) Relegated

== First League ==
=== League table ===
Pos	Team	Pld	W	D	L	GF	GA	GD	Pts	Promotion or relegation
1	Vorskla Poltava (C, P)	42	32	7	3	92	37	+55	103	Promoted to Vyshcha Liha
2	Bukovyna Chernivtsi	42	30	5	7	83	34	+49	95	
3	Stal Alchevsk	42	26	5	11	73	40	+33	83	
4	Polihraftekhnika Oleksandria	42	23	7	12	69	37	+32	76	
5	Metalurh Nikopol	42	23	5	14	59	40	+19	74	
6	Dynamo-2 Kyiv	42	20	12	10	64	42	+22	72	
7	Khimik Severodonetsk	42	20	11	11	68	32	+36	71	
8	Naftovyk Okhtyrka	42	18	12	12	52	37	+15	66	
9	Shakhtar Makiivka	42	19	7	16	63	55	+8	64	
10	Krystal Chortkiv	42	19	6	17	70	54	+16	63	
11	FC Lviv	42	18	8	16	55	42	+13	62	
12	Podillia Khmelnytskyi	42	17	11	14	57	50	+7	62	
13	Yavir Krasnopillia	42	17	9	16	53	43	+10	60	
14	Khimik Zhytomyr	42	16	10	16	55	57	−2	58	
15	Naftokhimik Kremenchuk (D)	42	16	7	19	43	45	−2	55	Withdrew
16	Veres Rivne	42	15	9	18	39	49	−10	54	
17	Zakarpattia Uzhhorod	42	14	8	20	49	67	−18	50	
18	SC Odesa	42	11	11	20	35	63	−28	44	
19	Metalist Kharkiv	42	10	9	23	40	54	−14	39	
20	Dnipro Cherkasy	42	6	4	32	26	91	−65	22	
21	Ratusha Kamyanets-Podilskyi (R)	42	6	2	34	14	103	−89	20	Relegation to Druha Liha
22	Skala Stryi (R)	42	2	3	37	21	108	−87	9	Relegation to Druha Liha

(C) Champions; (D) Withdrew; (P) Promoted; (R) Relegated

== Second League ==
=== Group A ===
Pos	Team	Pld	W	D	L	GF	GA	GD	Pts	Promotion or relegation
1	CSKA Kyiv (C, P)	40	27	8	5	61	27	+34	89	Promoted to Persha Liha
2	Krystal Kherson	40	24	7	9	75	29	+46	79	Play off
3	Khutrovyk Tysmenytsia	40	24	3	13	66	33	+33	75	
4	Obolon Kyiv	40	22	9	9	60	35	+25	75	
5	Kalush	40	22	8	10	64	31	+33	74	
6	Nyva-Cosmos Myronivka	40	21	10	9	59	36	+23	73	
7	Desna Chernihiv	40	21	9	10	55	30	+25	72	
8	Haray Zhovkva	40	20	7	13	49	35	+14	67	
9	Systema-Boreks Borodianka	40	17	12	11	34	31	+3	63	
10	Hazovyk Komarno	40	18	8	14	47	38	+9	62	
11	Avanhard Zhydachiv	40	18	8	14	44	44	0	62	
12	Karpaty Mukacheve	40	17	8	15	39	35	+4	59	
13	Keramik Baranivka	40	18	5	17	38	41	−3	59	
14	Halychyna Drohobych	40	16	8	16	39	40	−1	56	
15	Skhid Slavutych	40	14	10	16	43	51	−8	52	
16	Olimpiya Yuzhnoukrainsk	40	12	7	21	34	67	−33	43	
17	Ros Bila Tserkva	40	10	9	21	28	61	−33	39	
18	Ahrotekhservis Sumy (D)	40	8	6	26	25	77	−52	30	Dissolved
19	Skify Lviv (Note: SC Skify Lviv and FC Kakhovka quit the League after the first half.) (D)	40	6	5	29	20	28	−8	23	Withdrew
20	Dynamo-Flesh Odesa (D)	40	3	6	31	12	85	−73	15	Dissolved
21	Kakhovka (D)	40	3	3	34	11	49	−38	12	Withdrew
22	Temp-Advis-2 Shepetivka (Note: FC Temp-Advis-2 Shepetivka stopped its participation after the 7th round (results were scratched).) (D)	7	0	0	7	2	15	−13	0	Withdrew

Source: uafootball.net.ua
(C) Champions; (D) Disqualified; (P) Promoted

=== Group B ===
Pos	Team	Pld	W	D	L	GF	GA	GD	Pts	Promotion or relegation
1	Metalurh Mariupol (C, P)	38	30	4	4	70	24	+46	94	Promoted to Persha Liha
2	Metalurh Donetsk (O, P)	38	24	7	7	53	27	+26	79	Play off
3	Metalurh Novomoskovsk	38	23	6	9	53	33	+20	75	
4	Oskil Kupiansk	38	21	7	10	45	28	+17	70	
5	Avanhard-Industria Rovenky	38	19	11	8	45	36	+9	68	
6	Tytan Armyansk	38	19	10	9	59	38	+21	67	
7	Shakhtar Stakhanov	38	19	9	10	41	33	+8	66	
8	Viktor Zaporizhzhia	38	19	5	14	54	34	+20	62	
9	Shakhtar-2 Donetsk	38	18	7	13	44	32	+12	61	
10	Dynamo Saky	38	17	8	13	42	36	+6	59	
11	Druzhba Berdiansk	38	17	8	13	41	38	+3	59	
12	Chaika Sevastopol	38	17	7	14	55	39	+16	58	
13	Torpedo Melitopol	38	12	14	12	44	35	+9	50	
14	Portovyk Illichivsk	38	14	5	19	30	56	−26	47	
15	Dnistrovets B.-Dnistrovskyi (D)	38	13	7	18	25	54	−29	46	Withdrew
16	Hirnyk Komsomolsk	38	10	8	20	33	71	−38	38	
17	Sportinvest Kryvyi Rih (Note: After the winter break three other teams stopped their participation: Prometey Dniprodzerzhynsk, Dynamo Slovyansk, Sportinvest Kryvyi Rih.) (D)	38	6	2	30	20	33	−13	20	Withdrew
18	Shakhtar Sverdlovsk (Note: Shakhtar Sverdlovsk withdrew after the 25th round.) (D)	38	5	4	29	24	37	−13	19	Withdrew
19	Dynamo Slovyansk (D)	38	1	8	29	13	36	−23	11	Withdrew
20	Prometey Dniprodzerzhynsk (D)	38	1	1	36	10	81	−71	4	Withdrew
21	Kosmos Pavlohrad (Note: Kosmos Pavlohrad quit competition after the 11th round. All its results were annulled.) (D)	11	0	6	5	10	20	−10	6	Withdrew

Source: uafootball.net.ua
(C) Champions; (D) Disqualified; (O) Play-off winners; (P) Promoted
