= Tyulenev =

Tyulenev is a surname. Notable people with the surname include:

- Ivan Tyulenev (1892–1978), Soviet military commander
- Stanislav Tyulenev (born 1973), Kyrgyz footballer
