= Andriy Zakharov =

Andriy Zakharov may refer to:

- Andriy Zakharov (footballer)
- Andrey Zakharov (journalist)
