= Ihor Zhornyak =

Ukrainian footballer

Igor Zhornyak
Personal information
- Date of birth: 25 January 1976 (age 50)
- Place of birth: Chernihiv, Ukrainian SSR, USSR
- Height: 1.84 m (6 ft 0 in)
- Position: Defender

Senior career*
Years	Team	Apps	(Gls)
1993–1995	Desna Chernihiv	5	(0)
1995–1996	Voskhod Slavutich	15	(0)
1996–1997	Nerafa Slavutych	9	(0)
1998–1999	Fortuna-Cheksil Chernihiv	2	(0)
1999–2000	Desna Chernihiv	8	(0)
2000	FC Nizhyn	6	(0)
2001–2002	Energiya Chernigov	14	(3)
2004	Mena	2	(0)
- * Club domestic league appearances and goals as of 15 January 2022

Igor Zhornyak (Ukrainian: Ігор Васильович Жорняк) is a retired Ukrainian football player.

== Career ==
Igor Zhornyak started his career in 1993 with Desna Chernihiv where he played 2 matches. In the season 1994–95 he played 3 matches and he got 11th place in Ukrainian Second League, getting 11 place in the league. In 1995 he moved to Voskhod Slavutich where he played 15 matches and 9 matches with the same club that changed its name to Nerafa Slavutych. In 1998 he played 2 matches with Fortuna-Cheksil Chernihiv. In 1998 he moved back to Desna Chernihiv where he played 8 matches in Ukrainian Second League in the season 1999–2000. He also played 6 matches with FC Nizhyn and 14 matches with Energiya Chernigov and then he moved to Mena, another club in the Chernihiv Oblast.
