= Oleksandr Hrytsay =

Ukrainian footballer (born 1977)

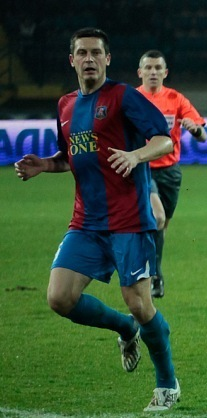
- Hrytsay with Dnipro Cherkasy

Personal information
- Full name: Oleksandr Anatoliyovych Hrytsay
- Date of birth: 30 September 1977 (age 49)
- Place of birth: Chernihiv, Soviet Union
- Height: 1.78 m (5 ft 10 in)
- Position: Central defender

Youth career
- 1993: Yunist Chernihiv

Senior career*
Years	Team	Apps	(Gls)
1994–1995	Cheksyl Chernihiv	25	(0)
1997–1999	Dnipro Cherkasy	70	(3)
1999–2010	Dnipro Dnipropetrovsk	194	(4)
2000–2002	→ Dnipro-2 Dnipropetrovsk	14	(1)
2000–2002	→ Dnipro-3 Dnipropetrovsk	4	(0)
2009	→ Kryvbas Kryvyi Rih (loan)	10	(0)
2009–2010	→ Arsenal Kyiv (loan)	27	(1)
2010–2012	Arsenal Kyiv	43	(0)
2012–2015	Zorya Luhansk	78	(3)
Total		461	(12)

International career
2007	Ukraine	3	(0)

Managerial career
- 2015–2019: Zorya Luhansk (assistant)
- 2020–2021: Rukh Lviv (assistant)
- 2021: VPK-Ahro Shevchenkivka
- 2022–2023: Dnipro-1 (assistant)
- 2025–2026: Chornomorets Odesa (assistant)
- * Club domestic league appearances and goals

Oleksandr Hrytsay (Ukrainian: Олександр Анатолійович Грицай; born 30 September 1977) is a Ukrainian retired professional footballer who played as central defender.

== Club career ==
=== Cheksyl Chernihiv ===
Hrytsay started his career at FC Cheksyl Chernihiv, where he played 25 matches.

=== Dnipro Cherkasy ===
Hrytsay moved to FC Dnipro Cherkasy from 1997 to 1999, scoring three goals in 70 appearances for the club.

=== Dnipro Dnipropetrovsk ===
In 1999, he moved to Dnipro Dnipropetrovsk, where is spent the majority of his career, scoring four goals in 194 appearances. He played in the final of the 2003–04 Ukrainian Cup with Dnipro he got in the final of the Ukrainian Cup.

=== Kryvbas Kryvyi Rih (On Loan) ===
In 2009 he moved on loan to Kryvbas Kryvyi Rih where he played 10 matches.

=== Arsenal Kyiv ===
In 2010 he moved on loan to Arsenal Kyiv, appearing in 27 matches, scoring a goal, and reaching the semi-final of Ukrainian Cup.

=== Zorya Luhansk ===
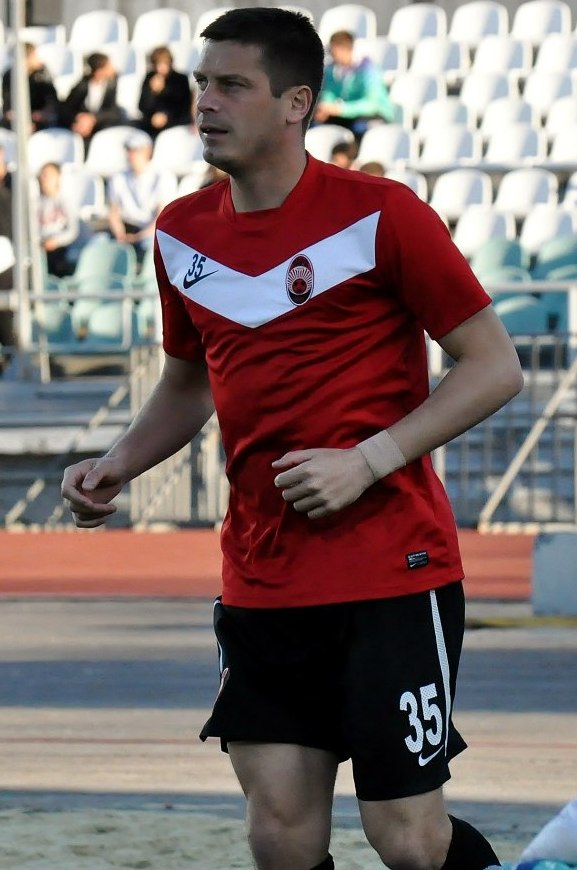
Hrytsay with Zorya Luhansk

On 9 January 2012, Hrytsay moved to Zorya Luhansk, where he stayed until 2015. In 2015 he retired and joined the coaching staff of the club.

== International career ==
Hrytsay made his debut for the Ukraine national football team on 22 August 2007 in a 2–1 victory over Uzbekistan. On 17 October 2007 he played against Faroe Islands replacing Anatoliy Tymoshchuk at 69 minute. On 21 November 2007, he played titular against France.

== Managerial career ==
From 2015 to 2019 he has been hired as Zorya Luhansk assistant coach. In 2020 he has been appointed as Rukh Lviv as assistant and he left in summer 2021. as he has been appointed as head coach of VPK-Ahro Shevchenkivka in Ukrainian First League. On 18 August 2021 he managed to bring the team into the Second preliminary round, after winning against Real Pharma Odesa in the season 2021–22 in Ukrainian Cup. On 31 August 2021 he managed to get the team into the Round of 32, after winning against Balkany Zorya in Ukrainian Cup in the season 2021–22. In 2025 he was appointed as assistant coach of Chornomorets Odesa.

== Honours ==
Dnipro Dnipropetrovsk

- Ukrainian Cup runner-up: 2003–04
