= Volodymyr Zhylin =

Soviet footballer and Ukrainian coach

Volodymyr Zhylin Vasylovych
Personal information
- Full name: Жилин Владимир Васильевич
- Date of birth: 26 February 1959 (age 67)
- Place of birth: Chernihiv, Ukrainian SSR, USSR
- Position: Forward

Senior career*
Years	Team	Apps	(Gls)
1977	SKA Kyiv	6	(1)
1978–1984	Dnipro Cherkasy	218	(28)
1985	Dinamo Bila Tserkva	21	(4)
1986–1987	Desna Chernihiv	80	(19)
1988	Polissya Zhytomyr	13	(1)
1992–1995	Tekstylnyk Chernihiv	22	(2)

Managerial career
- 1997-1998: Desna Chernihiv
- 2007: Lehenda Chernihiv (Head coach)
- * Club domestic league appearances and goals

Volodymyr Zhylin (Ukrainian: Жилин Владимир Васильевич; born 26 February 1959) is a retired Soviet football player and Ukrainian coach.

== Playing career ==
Volodymyr Zhylin, started his career in CSKA Kyiv, and with the team got second in *Championship of the Ukrainian SSR in 1977. In 1978 he moved to Dnipro Cherkasy. In 1985 he moved to Ros Bila Tserkva and in 1986 he played for Desna Chernihiv until 1987. In 1989, he moved to Polissya Zhytomyr in Soviet Second League and from 1992 until 1995 he moved to Tekstylnyk Chernihiv, that recently the name was changed in Cheksyl Chernihiv and he won the Chernihiv Oblast Football Championship in 1992 In the season 1993/1994 he got 4th in the league.

== Coaching career ==
From 1997 until 1998 he was appointed as Desna Chernihiv, then in 2007 he became the coach of the female football team Lehenda Chernihiv. With the club in got third place in Ukrainian Women's League and second in the Women's Cup in 2007.

== Honours ==
=== As player ===
CSKA Kyiv

- Championship of the Ukrainian SSR: Runner-up 1977

Tekstylnyk Chernihiv

- Chernihiv Oblast Football Championship: 1992
