= Serhiy Melnichenko =

Soviet footballer and Ukrainian coach

Personal information
- Full name: Мельниченко Сергей Владимирович
- Date of birth: 17 April 1965 (age 61)
- Place of birth: Chernihiv, Ukrainian SSR, USSR
- Height: 1.84 m (6 ft 0 in)
- Position: Midfielder

Senior career*
| Years | Team | Apps | (Gls) |
| 1983–1987 | Desna Chernihiv | 89 | (2) |
| 1985 | gidrotehnik chernigov fc | 0 | (0) |
| 1992–1994 | Cheksyl Chernihiv | 43 | (0) |
| 1994–1995 | Ros Bila Tserkva | 12 | (0) |
| 1994–1995 | Cheksyl Chernihiv | 15 | (0) |
| 1995–1996 | Desna Chernihiv | 12 | (1) |
| 1995–1996 | Ros Bila Tserkva | 18 | (0) |
| 1995–1996 | Domostroitel Chernihiv | 2 | (0) |
- * Club domestic league appearances and goals as of 15 January 2022

Serhiy Melnichenko (Ukrainian: Мельниченко Сергей Владимирович) is a retired Soviet and Ukrainian football player.

== Career ==
Serhiy Melnichenko started his career in 1985 with Desna Chernihiv, the main club in the city of Chernihiv for 3 seasons where he played 89 matches and scored 2 goals. Then he moved to Khimik Chernihiv. In 9985 he moved to gidrotehnik chernigov fc and in Cheksyl Chernihiv where he stayed until 1994 playing 43 matches. In 1994 he moved to Ros Bila Tserkva where he played 12 matches. In 1994 he moved back to Cheksyl Chernihiv where he played 15 matches and also 12 matches Desna Chernihiv, scoring 1 goals. In 1995 he returned to Ros Bila Tserkva where he played 18 matches and he played also 2 matches with Domostroitel Chernihiv.

== Honours ==
Cheksyl Chernihiv

- Chernihiv Oblast Football Championship: 1992
