= Oleh Ivashchenko (footballer) =

Soviet footballer and Ukrainian coach

Personal information
- Full name: Олег Михайлович Іващенко
- Date of birth: 5 May 1964 (age 62)
- Place of birth: Chernihiv, Ukrainian SSR, Soviet Union
- Height: 1.84 m (6 ft 0 in)
- Position: Midfielder

Senior career*
| Years | Team | Apps | (Gls) |
| 1985 | Desna Chernihiv | 1 | (0) |
| 1985 | Khimik Chernihiv | 1 | (0) |
| 1987 | Desna Chernihiv | 33 | (1) |
| 1993–1994 | Cheksyl Chernihiv | 12 | (0) |
| 1994–1997 | Desna Chernihiv | 89 | (3) |
| 1997–1998 | Slavutich-ChNPP" Slavutich | 16 | (0) |
| 1998–1999 | Domostroitel Chernihiv | 6 | (1) |
| 1999–2000 | Desna Chernihiv | 8 | (0) |
- * Club domestic league appearances and goals as of 28 November 2021

Oleh Mykhailovych Ivashchenko (Ukrainian: Олег Михайлович Іващенко; born 6 May 1954) is a retired Soviet and Ukrainian football player.

== Career ==
Oleh Ivashchenko started his career in 1985 with Desna Chernihiv, then he moved to Khimik Chernihiv, where he won the Chernihiv Oblast Football Championship and the Chernihiv Oblast Football Cup in 1985. Then he returned to Desna Chernihiv and in 1993 he moved to Cheksyl Chernihiv for one season where he played 12 matches. In 1994 he returned to Desna Chernihiv for three season where he played 89 and scored 3 goals where he won the Ukrainian Second League in season 1996–97. In 1997 he played 16 matches with Slavutich-ChNPP" Slavutich and 6 with Domostroitel Chernihiv. In 1999 he played 8 matches again with Desna Chernihiv.

== Honours ==
Desna Chernihiv

- Ukrainian Second League: 1996–97

Khimik Chernihiv

- Chernihiv Oblast Football Championship: 1985
- Chernihiv Oblast Football Cup: 1985
