= 1994–95 in Ukrainian football =

The 1994–95 season was the fourth season of competitive football in Ukraine.

== National team ==
26 August 1994
friendly match

United Arab Emirates	1 – 1	Ukraine
Al-Owairan ?'		Finkel 90'

7 September 1994
Euro 1996 qualifier

Ukraine	0 – 2	Lithuania
		Ivanauskas 53'; Skarbalius 61'

11 September 1994
friendly match

South Korea	1 – 0	Ukraine
Hong Myung Bo 77' (pen.)

13 September 1994
friendly match

South Korea	2 – 0	Ukraine
Kim Do Hun 30'; Hwang Sun-Hong 60'

10 October 1994
Euro 1996 qualifier

Ukraine	0 – 0	Slovenia

13 November 1994
Euro 1996 qualifier

Ukraine	3 – 0	Estonia
Konovalov 30'; Kirs 45' (o.g.); Guseinov 72'

25 March 1995
Euro 1996 qualifier

Croatia	4 – 0	Ukraine
Boban 14'; Suker 20', 80'; Prosinecki 71' (pen.)

29 March 1995
Euro 1996 qualifier

Ukraine	0 – 2	Italy
		Lombardo 11'; Dzola 38'

26 April 1995
Euro 1996 qualifier

Estonia	0 – 1	Ukraine
		Guseinov 17'

11 June 1995
Euro 1996 qualifier

Ukraine	1 – 0	Croatia
Kalitvintsev 13'

== Premier League ==
=== League table ===
Pos	Team	Pld	W	D	L	GF	GA	GD	Pts	Qualification or relegation
1	Dynamo Kyiv (C)	34	25	8	1	87	24	+63	83	Qualification to Champions League qualifying round
2	Chornomorets Odesa	34	22	7	5	62	29	+33	73	Qualification to UEFA Cup qualifying round
3	Dnipro Dnipropetrovsk (Note: Participant of the 1995 Ukrainian Cup Final.)	34	19	8	7	60	33	+27	65	
4	Shakhtar Donetsk	34	18	8	8	52	29	+23	62	Qualification to Cup Winners' Cup qualifying round
5	Tavriya Simferopol	34	17	8	9	61	37	+24	59	
6	Kryvbas Kryvyi Rih	34	13	9	12	35	30	+5	48	
7	Torpedo Zaporizhzhia	34	15	3	16	49	49	0	48	
8	Karpaty Lviv	34	12	9	13	32	36	−4	45	
9	Metalurh Zaporizhzhia	34	11	10	13	47	42	+5	43	
10	Kremin Kremenchuk	34	12	6	16	42	54	−12	42	
11	Prykarpattya Ivano-Frankivsk	34	11	8	15	40	52	−12	41	
12	Nyva Ternopil	34	11	5	18	40	44	−4	38	
13	SC Mykolaiv	34	11	5	18	33	59	−26	38	
14	Nyva Vinnytsia	34	10	7	17	38	51	−13	37	
15	Volyn Lutsk	34	11	3	20	29	58	−29	36	
16	Zorya-MALS Luhansk	34	10	5	19	35	70	−35	35	
17	Temp Shepetivka (R)	34	10	4	20	31	41	−10	34	Relegated to Ukrainian First League
18	Veres Rivne (R)	34	8	7	19	28	63	−35	31	Relegated to Ukrainian First League

Source: uafootball.net.ua
Rules for classification: 1st points; 2nd goal difference; 3rd goal scored
(C) Champions; (R) Relegated

== First League ==
=== League table ===
Pos	Team	Pld	W	D	L	GF	GA	GD	Pts	Promotion or relegation
1	Zirka-NIBAS Kirovohrad (C, P)	42	27	10	5	68	26	+42	91	Promoted to Vyshcha Liha
2	CSKA-Borysfen Boryspil (P)	42	26	9	7	73	31	+42	87	Promoted to Vyshcha Liha
3	Metalurh Nikopol	42	24	7	11	66	42	+24	79	
4	Khimik Zhytomyr	42	20	15	7	61	37	+24	75	
5	Naftovyk Okhtyrka	42	23	3	16	69	51	+18	72	
6	Podillia Khmelnytskyi	42	20	11	11	48	39	+9	71	
7	Dynamo-2 Kyiv	42	19	8	15	65	40	+25	65	
8	Polihraftekhnika Oleksandria	42	18	8	16	59	37	+22	62	
9	Stal Alchevsk	42	19	5	18	57	50	+7	62	
10	Metalist Kharkiv	42	17	9	16	48	44	+4	60	
11	Vorskla Poltava	42	17	8	17	49	48	+1	59	
12	SC Odesa	42	16	8	18	51	51	0	56	
13	Bazhanovets Makiivka	42	16	7	19	52	57	−5	55	
14	Khimik Siverodonetsk	42	15	9	18	43	56	−13	54	
15	Bukovyna Chernivtsi	42	16	5	21	43	45	−2	53	
16	Naftokhimik Kremenchuk	42	14	10	18	50	50	0	52	
17	Zakarpattia Uzhhorod	42	12	10	20	40	62	−22	46	
18	Krystal Chortkiv	42	12	9	21	35	67	−32	45	
19	Skala Stryi	42	12	9	21	31	65	−34	45	
20	Dnipro Cherkasy	42	11	8	23	32	48	−16	41	
21	Karpaty Mukacheve (R)	42	12	5	25	39	74	−35	41	Relegated to Second League
22	FC Sumy (R)	42	8	3	31	22	81	−59	27	Relegated to Second League

(C) Champions; (P) Promoted; (R) Relegated

== Second League ==
=== League table ===
Pos	Team	Pld	W	D	L	GF	GA	GD	Pts	Promotion or relegation
1	Yavir Krasnopillia (C, P)	42	29	6	7	71	30	+41	93	Promoted to First League
2	FC Lviv (P)	42	30	3	9	73	39	+34	93	Promoted to First League
3	Dynamo Luhansk (D)	42	26	5	11	72	47	+25	83	Merged with Metalurh Mariupol
4	Dynamo Saky	42	25	5	12	62	33	+29	80	
5	Halychyna Drohobych	42	25	5	12	49	29	+20	80	
6	Titan Armyansk	42	22	10	10	68	36	+32	76	
7	Medita Shakhtarsk	42	22	8	12	57	36	+21	74	
8	Hazovyk Komarno	42	22	6	14	66	39	+27	72	
9	Meliorator Kakhovka	42	21	9	12	49	40	+9	72	
10	Druzhba Berdiansk	42	16	11	15	41	43	−2	59	
11	Desna Chernihiv	42	17	7	18	44	43	+1	58	
12	Azovets Mariupol	42	17	6	19	37	55	−18	57	
13	Chaika Sevastopol	42	16	8	18	42	45	−3	56	
14	Transimpeks-Ros Bila Tserkva	42	14	7	21	41	63	−22	49	
15	Artania Ochakiv (D)	42	13	8	21	30	58	−28	47	Merged with Olympiya FC
16	Sirius Kryvyi Rih (Note: Sirius Kryvyi Rih moved from Zhovti Vody in June 1995.) (D)	42	13	6	23	40	57	−17	45	Merged with Sportinvest Kryvyi Rih
17	Viktor Zaporizhzhia	42	12	6	24	54	60	−6	42	
18	Vodnyk Kherson	42	11	7	24	35	61	−26	40	
19	Okean Kerch (D)	42	11	5	26	42	67	−25	38	Withdrew
20	Shakhtar-2 Donetsk	42	10	7	25	37	71	−34	37	
21	Chornomorets-2 Odesa (D)	42	6	11	25	19	48	−29	29	Replaced with FC Dynamo-Dogma Odesa
22	Shakhtar Pavlohrad	42	5	12	25	33	62	−29	27	Avoided relegation

Source: uafootball.net.ua
(C) Champions; (D) Disqualified; (P) Promoted
