= Ihor Khimanych =

Ukrainian association football player (born 1966)

Igor Khimanych
Personal information
- Date of birth: 11 June 1966 (age 60)
- Place of birth: Ukrainian SSR, USSR
- Height: 1.84 m (6 ft 1/2 in)
- Position: Goalkeeper

Senior career*
Years	Team	Apps	(Gls)
1986	Zirka Kirovohrad	2	(0)
1989	Kolos Nikopol	4	(0)
1989–1990	Kryvbas Kryvyi Rih	5	(0)
1991–1992	Khimik Sieverodonetsk	42	(0)
1992	Tavriya Kherson	0	(0)
1992	Khimik Sieverodonetsk	10	(0)
1993	Ros Bila Tserkva	2	(0)
1994	Kryvbas-Ruda Kryvyi Rih	15	(0)
1996–1996	Desna Chernihiv	57	(4)
1997	Slavutich	16	(3)
1999	System-Borex Borodianka	2	(0)
2000–2001	Fakel Varva	23	(0)
2003	Smorgon	6	(0)

Managerial career
- 2011: Khujand (assistant)
- 2012: Pamir Dushanbe (assistant)
- 2017: Arsenal Kyiv (goalkeeper coach)
- 2018: Alliance Lypova Dolyna (goalkeeper coach)
- * Club domestic league appearances and goals as of 25 November 2022

Igor Khimanych (Ukrainian: Химанич Ігор Миколайович) is a retired Soviet and Ukrainian football player goalkeeper.

== Career ==
Ihor Khimanych was born in Kryvyi Rih. In 1986, he made his debut in Zirka Kirovohrad, for which he played 2 matches. He made his next attempt to gain a foothold in the team of masters in 1989, joining the Kolos Nikopol, but already in the same season he returned to his hometown, concluding an agreement with Kryvbas Kryvyi Rih. In the spring of 1995, Khimanych joined the Desna Chernihiv, the club in the city of Chernihiv. In the season 1996–97 with the club he won the Ukrainian Second League. At the end of 1999, he defended the colors of System-Borex Borodianka and later he played in the amateur championship for Fakel-GPZ Varva with the club he won the Chernihiv Oblast Football Championship in 2000. In 2003 he moved to Smorgon in the Belarusian Premier League.

== Coach career ==
After he retired from playing football, in 2011 he was appointed as coach of Khujand and in 2012 for Pamir Dushanbe. In 2017, he moved to the position of goalkeeping coach of Arsenal Kyiv and in 2018 he was invited to be goalkeeper coach for Alliance Lypova.

== Honours ==
Fakel Varva

- Chernihiv Oblast Football Championship 2001

Desna Chernihiv

- Ukrainian Second League: 1996–97
