= Yunost Stadium =

Yunost Stadium may refer to:

- Yunost Stadium (Armavir), Russia
- Yunost Stadium (Lida), Belarus
- Yunost Stadium (Mozyr), Belarus
- Yunost Stadium (Oral), Kazakhstan
- Yunost Stadium (Slonim), Belarus
- Yunost Stadium (Smorgon), Belarus
- Yunost Stadium (Osipovichi), Belarus
- Yunost Stadium (Chernihiv), Ukraine
