= Kakhaberi Sartania =

Georgian footballer

Personal information
- Date of birth: 8 August 1967 (age 59)
- Place of birth: Georgia SSR, USSR
- Height: 1.84 m (6 ft 0 in)
- Position: Defender

Senior career*
Years	Team	Apps	(Gls)
1990–1993	Odishi 1919	59	(8)
1993–1994	Desna Chernihiv	17	(0)
1993–1994	Budivelnyk Brovary	5	(0)
1994–1995	Vorskla Poltava	19	(0)
1994–1996	Desna Chernihiv	23	(0)
1995–1996	Elektron Romny	5	(1)
1996–1998	Desna Chernihiv	53	(1)
1997–1998	Slavutych-ChAES Slavutych	2	(0)
1998–2000	Desna Chernihiv	43	(1)
2000	Nizhyn	14	(0)
- * Club domestic league appearances and goals as of 12 January 2022

Kakhaberi Sartania (Georgian: კახაბერი სართანია; born 8 August 1967) is a Georgian former professional footballer.

== Honours ==
Nizhyn

- Chernihiv Oblast Football Championship: 2000
- Chernihiv Oblast Football Cup: 2000

Desna Chernihiv

- Ukrainian Second League: 1996–97
