= Petro Pylypeyko =

Soviet footballer

Peter Pilipeyko
Personal information
- Full name: Пилипейко Пётр Сергеевич
- Date of birth: 1 June 1968 (age 58)
- Place of birth: Chernihiv, Ukrainian SSR, USSR
- Height: 1.84 m (6 ft 0 in)
- Position: Forward

Senior career*
Years	Team	Apps	(Gls)
1994–1987	Desna Chernihiv	129	(34)
1997–1998	Slavutich-Chernobyl	10	(2)
1998–2000	Desna Chernihiv	36	(4)
2000	Fakel Varva	16	(6)
- * Club domestic league appearances and goals as of 15 January 2022

Peter Pilipeyko (Ukrainian: Пилипейко Пётр Сергеевич) is a retired Soviet and Ukrainian football player.

== Career ==
Peter Komanda started his career in 1994 with Desna Chernihiv, where he played until December 1997. In the season 1994–1995 he played 40 matches and scored 10 goals, where he got 11th place in Ukrainian Second League. In January 1998 he played 10 matches with Slavutich-Chernobyl, where he scored 2 goals. In 1998 he returned to Desna Chernihiv where he stayed until 2000, where he played 36 matches and scored 4 goals. In 2000 he moved to Fakel Varva where he played 16 matches and scored 6 goals and after he ended his career.
