= Serhiy Datsenko (footballer, born 1977) =

Ukrainian manager and former footballer

Personal information
- Full name: Serhiy Anatoliyovych Datsenko
- Date of birth: 10 December 1977 (age 48)
- Place of birth: Chernihiv, Ukrainian SSR
- Height: 1.82 m (5 ft 11 1/2 in)
- Position: Defender

Youth career
- Yunist Chernihiv
- Desna Chernihiv

Senior career*
Years	Team	Apps	(Gls)
1994–1996	Desna Chernihiv	28	(6)
1996–1997	Dynamo Kyiv	1	(0)
1996	→ Dynamo-2 Kyiv	34	(4)
1997	→ Dynamo-3 Kyiv	6	(1)
1997–1998	Metalurh Donetsk	20	(0)
1997–1998	→ Metalurh-2 Donetsk	8	(4)
1998–1999	Kryvbas Kryvyi Rih	22	(1)
1999	→ Kryvbas-2 Kryvyi Rih	5	(0)
2000	Dynamo Kyiv	0	(0)
2000	→ Dynamo-2 Kyiv	2	(0)
2000	→ Dynamo-3 Kyiv	4	(0)
2000–2004	Rostov	93	(4)
2005	Terek Grozny	4	(0)
2012–2018	Avanhard Koriukivka	75	(8)
2018–2022	Kudrivka	10	(1)

International career
1998	Ukraine U21	2	(0)

Managerial career
- 2020–2022: Kudrivka (assistant)
- 2022–2023: Kudrivka
- * Club domestic league appearances and goals as of 20 March 2023

Serhiy Anatoliyovych Datsenko (Ukrainian: Сергій Анатолійович Даценко; born 10 December 1977) is a Ukrainian manager and former professional footballer.

== Playing career ==
Datsenko started his career at Yunist Chernihiv before moving to Desna Chernihiv youth system. In 1994 he moved to the senior team of Desna Chernihiv where he played for two years before moving to Dynamo Kyiv in Ukrainian Premier League.

== Coaching career ==
In 2022, he was appointed as coach of Kudrivka where he managed to bring the club to win the Chernihiv Oblast Football Cup. In the mean time the club was admitted in Ukrainian Second League for the first time. He has been elected best Coach of Round 13 of Ukrainian Second League of the season 2021–22 He has been elected best Coach of Round 13 of the 2023–24 Ukrainian Second League. In November 2023, despite the results of the club were quite good, he was sacked by the management's club.

== Honours ==
=== As a Manager ===
Kudrivka

- Chernihiv Oblast Football Cup: 2021, 2022
- Kyiv Oblast Football Federation: 2020
- Kyiv Oblast Football Cup: 2021

=== As a Player ===
Avanhard Koryukivka

- Chernihiv Oblast Football Champions: 2012, 2013
- Chernihiv Oblast Football Cup: 2013

Dynamo Kyiv 2

- Ukrainian First League: 2000–01

Dynamo Kyiv

- Ukrainian Premier League: 1996–97
