= Oleksandr Mitko =

Ukrainian footballer

Personal information
- Date of birth: 3 August 1974 (age 52)
- Place of birth: Chernihiv, Ukrainian SSR, USSR
- Height: 1.84 m (6 ft 0 in)
- Position: Goalkeeper

Senior career*
| Years | Team | Apps | (Gls) |
| 1994–1999 | Desna Chernihiv | 22 | (0) |
| 1998–1999 | Nyva Vinnytsia | 0 | (0) |
| 1999–2000 | Desna Chernihiv | 6 | (0) |
| 2001 | Yevropa Pryluky | 2 | (0) |
| 2001 | FC Nizhyn | 3 | (0) |
| 2002–2003 | Fakel Varva | 7 | (0) |
| 2004 | Kommunalnik Zhlobin | 23 | (0) |
- * Club domestic league appearances and goals as of 15 January 2022

Oleksandr Mitko (Ukrainian: Митько Александр Михайлович) is a Ukrainian retired football player.

== Career ==
Volodymyr Kolomiets started his career in 1994 with Desna Chernihiv, the main club in the city of Chernihiv. In the season 1996–97 with the club he won the Ukrainian Second League. In 2001 he played 2 matches with Yevropa Pryluky and 3 with FC Nizhyn. In 2002 he moved to Fakel Varva where he won the Chernihiv Oblast Football Championship. In 2004 he moved to Kommunalnik Zhlobin from Zhlobin, playing in the Belarusian Second League.

== Honours ==
Fakel Varva

- Chernihiv Oblast Football Championship 2002

Desna Chernihiv

- Ukrainian Second League: 1996–97
