= Vadym Danylevskyi =

Ukrainian footballer

Vadim Danilevskiy
Personal information
- Full name: Данилевський Вадим Вікторович
- Date of birth: 9 April 1972 (age 54)
- Place of birth: Chernihiv Ukrainian SSR, USSR
- Height: 1.84 m (6 ft 0 in)
- Position: Midfielder

Senior career*
Years	Team	Apps	(Gls)
1994–1995	Tekstylschyk Chernihiv	12	(0)
1996–1998	Desna Chernihiv	22	(1)
1997–1998	Slavutich-ChNPP Slavutich	3	(0)
1998–2000	Desna Chernihiv	24	(1)
- * Club domestic league appearances and goals as of 15 January 2022

Vadim Danilevskiy (Ukrainian: Данилевський Вадим Вікторович) is a retired Ukrainian football player.

== Career ==
Vadim Danilevskiy started his career with Tekstylschyk Chernihiv in the city of Chernihiv. In 1996 he moved to the main club of the city Desna Chernihiv where he played 22 matches and scored 1 goal until 1998. He also played 3 matches with Slavutich-ChNPP" Slavutich and then he returned Desna Chernihiv in 1998 for two season where he played 24 matches and scored 1 goal. In 2000 he ended his career in the club of Chernihiv.
