= FC Cheksyl Chernihiv =

Ukrainian football club

FC Cheksil Chernihiv
- Full name: ФК Чексил Чернигов
- Nickname(s): Чексил
- Founded: 1983-1997
- Dissolved: 1999
- Ground: Stadium Tekstylnyk, Chernihiv
- League: Chernihiv Oblast Football Championship

FC Cheksyl Chernihiv (Ukrainian: ФК Чексіл Чернигов) was a Ukrainian football club established in 1983 as a local clothing factory team known as "Cheksil" during the Soviet era. It was disbanded in 1999. The team also produced players like Oleksandr Hrytsay, and Ihor Bobovych and Oleh Hrytsai from Chernihiv.

== History ==
=== Origin as Tekstylschyk Chernihiv ===
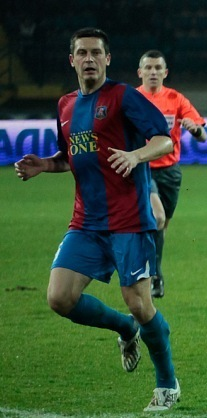
Oleksandr Hrytsay started his career in Cheksil Chernihiv

In 1983, the team was established as "Tekstylschyk Chernihiv", winning the Chernihiv Oblast Football Championship in its first season as well as the Chernihiv Oblast Football Cup the following year.

=== Rebranding as FC Cheksyl Chernihiv ===
In 1992, the team changed its name to FC Cheksyl Chernihiv and won the Chernihiv Oblast Football Championship for a second time, adding a third title five years later in 1997.

== Facilities & Venue ==
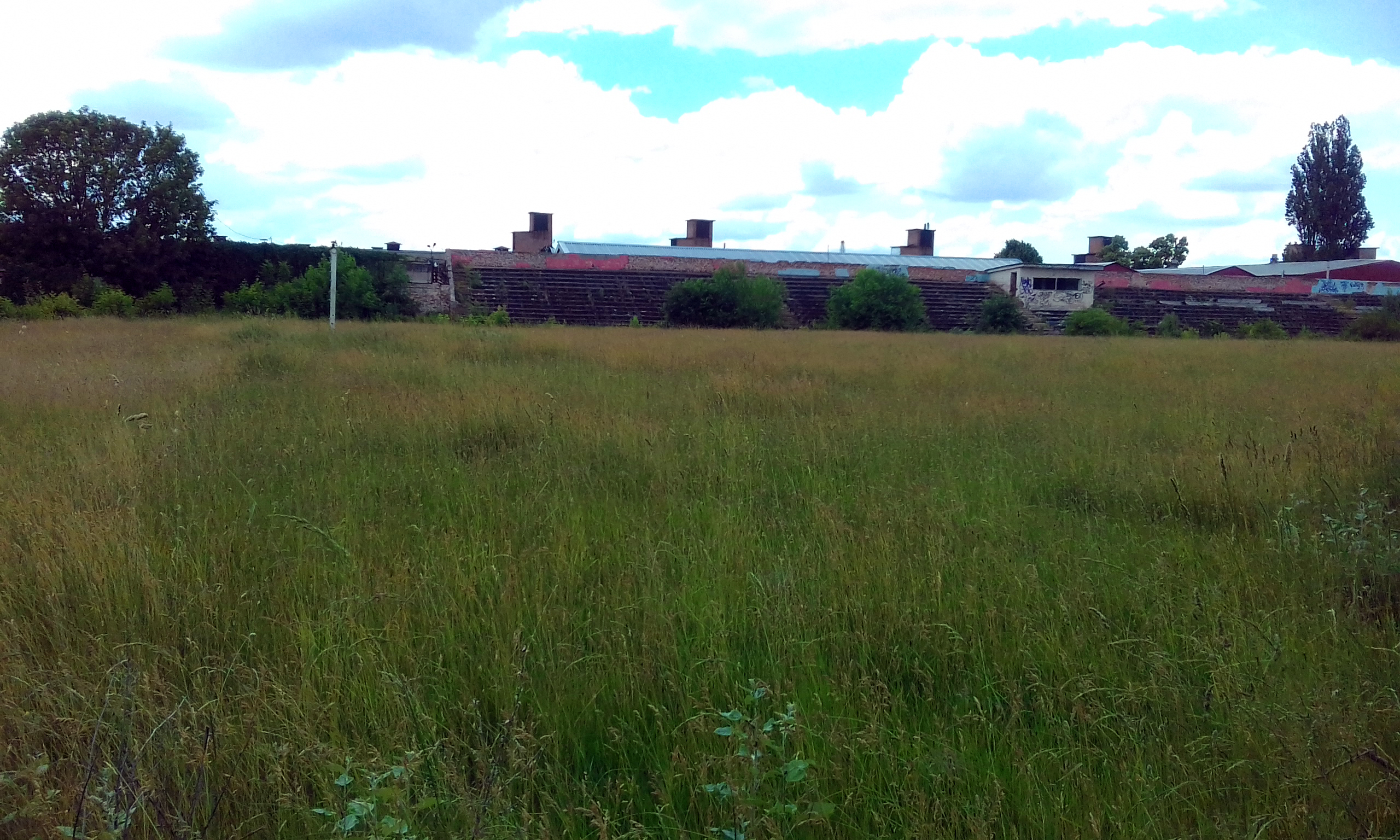
Tekstylnyk stadium in Chernihiv

The team played in the Stadium Tekstylschyk, located in Ushinsky, Novozavodsky District. The stadium was also used by the female football club WFC Lehenda-ShVSM Chernihiv. The venue was used also by Desna-3 Chernihiv, Desna-2 Chernihiv, SDYuShOR Desna and Spartak ShVSM Chernihiv.

== Honours ==
Chernihiv Oblast Football Championship

- Winners (3): 1983, 1992, 1997

Chernihiv Oblast Football Cup

- Winners (1): 1984

== Notable players ==
- (Ukraine) Oleksandr Hrytsay
- (Ukraine) Oleh Hrytsai
- (Soviet Union) Vadym Postovoy
- (Soviet Union) Hennadiy Horshkov
- (Soviet Union) Ihor Zhornyak
- (Ukraine) Ihor Bobovych
- (Ukraine) Valentyn Buhlak
- (Ukraine) Volodymyr Zhylin
- (Soviet Union) Viktor Lazarenko
- (Ukraine) Andrey Belousov
- (Ukraine) Serhiy Zelinsky
- (Ukraine) Oleh Ivashchenko
- (Ukraine) Oleksandr Kormich
- (Ukraine) Serhiy Melnichenko
- (Ukraine) Peter Komanda
- (Ukraine) Andrey Krivenok
- (Ukraine) Vladimir Drobot
- (Ukraine) Oleksandr Stelmakh
- (Ukraine) Vadim Danilevskiy
- (Ukraine) Volodymyr Matsuta
- (Ukraine) Oleksandr Lepekho
- (Ukraine) Oleksandr Selivanov
- (Ukraine) Viktor Rudyi
- (Ukraine) Andriy Huz
- (Ukraine) Vitaliy Arinin
- (Ukraine) Yuriy Cherezov

== See also ==
- List of sport teams in Chernihiv
- FC Desna Chernihiv
- FC Desna-2 Chernihiv
- FC Desna-3 Chernihiv
- SDYuShOR Desna
- Yunist Chernihiv
- Yunist ShVSM
- Lehenda Chernihiv
