= Volodymyr Kolomiets =

Ukrainian footballer

Vyacheslav Kolomiyets
Personal information
- Full name: Vyacheslav Volodymyrovych Kolomiyets
- Date of birth: 14 March 1974 (age 52)
- Place of birth: Chernihiv, Ukrainian SSR, USSR
- Height: 1.84 m (6 ft 0 in)
- Position: Defender

Senior career*
Years	Team	Apps	(Gls)
1995–1999	Desna Chernihiv	103	(3)
1999–2000	Polissya Zhytomyr	16	(0)
2000	Fakel Varva	15	(2)
2001	Yevropa Pryluky	4	(0)
2001–2002	Fakel Varva	3	(0)
2003–2004	Nizhyn	10	(0)
- * Club domestic league appearances and goals as of 15 January 2022

Vyacheslav Volodymyrovych Kolomiyets (Ukrainian: В'ячеслав Володимирович Коломієць) is a retired Ukrainian footballer who last played as defender for FC Nizhyn.

== Career ==
Volodymyr Kolomiets started his career in 1995 with Desna Chernihiv, the main club in the city of Chernihiv. In the season 1996–97 he won the Ukrainian Second League. In 1999 he moved to Polissya Zhytomyr in Ukrainian First League in the season 1999–2000. In 2000 he moved to where he moved to Fakel Varva where he played 15 matches where he scored 2 goals and he won the Chernihiv Oblast Football Championship. In 2001 he played 4 matches with Yevropa Pryluky and 3 matches with Fakel Varva. In 2003 he moved to FC Nizhyn where he played 10 matches.

== Honours ==
Nizhyn

- Chernihiv Oblast Football Championship 2004
- Chernihiv Oblast Football Cup: 2003, 2004

Fakel Varva

- Chernihiv Oblast Football Championship 2001, 2002

Desna Chernihiv

- Ukrainian Second League: 1996–97
