= Ihor Bobovych =

Ukrainian footballer

Personal information
- Full name: Ihor Mykhailovych Bobovych
- Date of birth: 18 November 1975 (age 50)
- Place of birth: Chernihiv, Ukrainian SSR, USSR
- Height: 1.86 m (6 ft 1 in)
- Position: Forward

Youth career
- 1992: Khimik Chernihiv
- 1992–1993: Tekstylschyk Chernihiv

Senior career*
Years	Team	Apps	(Gls)
1993–1998	Desna Chernihiv	130	(14)
1998–2000	Nyva Vinnytsia	44	(2)
2000	Polissya Zhytomyr	13	(0)
2001	Desna Chernihiv	26	(4)
2002–2003	Chornomorets Odesa	42	(6)
2003	Chornomorets-2 Odesa	1	(3)
2003–2006	Desna Chernihiv	92	(30)
2007	Smorgon	6	(1)
2007–2008	Desna Chernihiv	3	(0)
2008–2009	Polissya Dobryanka	4	(1)
- * Club domestic league appearances and goals

Ihor Mykhailovych Bobovych (Ukrainian: Ігор Михайлович Бобович; born 18 November 1975) is a retired Ukrainian football player. He spend most of his career to Desna Chernihiv.

== Career ==
Bobovych, started his young career in 1992, he played for FC Khimik Chernihiv until 1993, then in the season 1992-1993 he played for Tekstylschyk Chernihiv. In 1993 the coach of Desna Chernihiv, called him and he started his career in the main club of Chernihiv. In 2001 he moved Chornomorets Odesa, the main city of Odesa, where he won the Ukrainian First League in the season 2001–02 and he got promoted to Ukrainian Premier League. In 2007 he moved to FC Smorgon a team in Belarus, where he played almost 6 games and scored 1 goal. In 2017 he gave an interview at the Desna Chernihiv, where he spoke about the improvement of the team of Chernihiv.

== Honours ==
Tekstylschyk Chernihiv

- Chernihiv Oblast Football Federation: 1993

Desna Chernihiv

- Ukrainian Second League: 1996–97, 2005–06
