= Serhiy Zelinskyi =

Ukrainian footballer

Serhiy Zelinsky
Personal information
- Date of birth: 14 January 1972 (age 54)
- Place of birth: Chernihiv, Ukrainian SSR, USSR
- Height: 1.74 m (5 ft 8 1/2 in)
- Position: Midfielder

Youth career
- SDYuShOR Desna

Senior career*
Years	Team	Apps	(Gls)
1989–1991	Desna Chernihiv	26	(1)
1992–1993	Torpedo Zaporizhzhia	10	(0)
1993–1994	Tavriya Kherson	28	(4)
1995–1996	Desna Chernihiv	54	(8)
1997	Cheksyl Chernihiv	0	(0)
1997	Domostroitel Chernigov	2	(0)
1998	Torpedo-Kadino Mogilev	23	(3)
1999	Fakel Varva	11	(8)
1999	Volyn Lutsk	14	(2)
2000	Tyumen	14	(4)
2001–2002	Fakel Varva	27	(7)
2008	Druzhba-Nova Varva	18	(4)
- * Club domestic league appearances and goals as of 28 November 2021

Serhiy Zelinsky (Ukrainian: Зелінський Сергій Леонідович) is a retired Soviet and Ukrainian football player. He is known for his performances in the club of the Premier League Torpedo Zaporizhzhia, as well as performances in Ukrainian clubs of the lower league and in the top Belarusian division in the team Torpedo Mogilev.

== Career ==
Serhiy Zelinsky was born in Chernihiv. The young football player made his debut in the local team Desna Chernihiv, which at that time played in the Soviet Second League, in 1989, and played in its composition until 1991. Zelinsky made his debut in the Ukrainian Premier League in September 1992 for the high-league club Torpedo Mogilev. Having played for the team in 10 matches of the Ukrainian championship, Serhiy Zelinsky became a player of the Ukrainian Second League team Krystal Kherson from Kherson. The footballer played for this team for a year and a half, but did not become a major player in it, and in early 1995 he returned to the Desna Chernihiv, which at that time played in the first Ukrainian league. However, during his performances Zelinsky also did not become a player of the team, and from the beginning of 1997 he played for the Chernihiv amateur teams "Domobudivnyk" and Tekstilnyk. In 1998, Sergei Zelinsky played in the club of the highest Belarusian division Torpedo Mogilev from Mogilev. After returning to Ukraine, the footballer played for the amateur teams GPZ from Varva and Sula from Luben. From July 1999, Zelinsky played for the Ukrainian First League club Volyn Lutsk from Lutsk, but in six months he left the team and became a player of the Second League Russian club Tyumen from the city of the same name. After returning to Ukraine, the footballer again played for an amateur club from Druzhba-Nova Varva, now called Druzhba-Nova Varva, and finished his performances on the football fields.

== Honours ==
Fakel Varva

- Ukrainian Football Amateur League: 1998–99
- Chernihiv Oblast Football Championship: 2001

Cheksyl Chernihiv

- Chernihiv Oblast Football Championship: 1997

Desna Chernihiv

- Ukrainian Second League: 1996–97
