= Oleksandr Marek =

Ukrainian footballer

Personal information
- Date of birth: 27 May 1972 (age 54)
- Place of birth: Chernihiv, Ukrainian SSR, USSR
- Height: 1.84 m (6 ft 0 in)
- Position: Defender

Senior career*
Years	Team	Apps	(Gls)
1991–1993	CSKA Kyiv	65	(1)
1993–1994	Shakhtar Stakhanov	12	(1)
1994–1996	Desna Chernihiv	34	(2)
1995–1996	Systema-Boreks Borodianka	5	(0)
- * Club domestic league appearances and goals as of 20 January 2022

Oleksandr Marek (Ukrainian: Марек Александр Ярославович) is a retired Ukrainian footballer.

== Career ==
Oleksandr Marek started his career in 1991 with CSKA Kyiv in Soviet Second League for two season where he played 65 matches and scored 1 goal. In 1993 he moved to Shakhtar Stakhanov for one season playing 12 matches and scored 1 goal. In 1994 he moved to Desna Chernihiv, the main club of Chernihiv, in Ukrainian Second League, where he played 34 matches and scored 2 goals. In the season 1994–95 he played 27 matches and scored 2 goals. In 1995 he moved to Systema-Boreks Borodianka where he played 5 matches.
