= Oleksandr Kormych =

Soviet footballer and Ukrainian coach

Personal information
- Full name: Кормич Олександр Леонідович
- Date of birth: 2 October 1972 (age 54)
- Place of birth: Ukrainian SSR, USSR
- Height: 1.84 m (6 ft 0 in)
- Position: Defender

Senior career*
Years	Team	Apps	(Gls)
1992–1994	Cheksyl Chernihiv	20	(3)
1994–1995	Desna Chernihiv	16	(2)
1994–1995	Cheksyl Chernihiv	12	(0)
1995–1997	Desna Chernihiv	17	(0)
1995–1997	Domostroitel Chernihiv	0	(0)
- * Club domestic league appearances and goals as of 29 November 2021

Oleksandr Kormych (Ukrainian: Олександр Леонідович Кормич) is a Soviet and Ukrainian former professional footballer played as a defender.

== Career ==
Oleksandr Kormych started his career with Cheksyl Chernihiv the club in Chernihiv, in 1992 where he won the Chernihiv Oblast Football Championship in 1992. In the season 1993-1994 he played 20 matches. In summer 1994, he moved to the main club of the city Desna Chernihiv, where he played 16 matches and scored 2 goals. In January 1995, he returned to Cheksyl Chernihiv where he playing 12 matches. In summer 1995 he moved to Desna Chernihiv where the club was in Ukrainian Second League here he played 17 matches where with the club got 7th place in the season 1995–96. In the season 1996–97 he played 2 matches with the club of Chernihiv and then in January 1997 he had been transferred to Domostroitel Chernihiv, where he ended his career without playing.

== Honours ==
Cheksyl Chernihiv

- Chernihiv Oblast Football Championship: 1992
