= Stanislav Tyulenev =

Kyrgyzstani footballer

Personal information
- Date of birth: 2 January 1973 (age 53)
- Place of birth: Bishkek, Kyrgyzstan SSR, USSR
- Height: 1.84 m (6 ft 1/2 in)
- Position: Goalkeeper

Senior career*
| Years | Team | Apps | (Gls) |
| 1991–1992 | Alga Bishkek | 15 | (8) |
| 1992–1994 | Dnipro Cherkasy | 23 | (0) |
| 1994–1995 | Desna Chernihiv | 3 | (0) |
| 1995 | Kolos Krasnodar | 0 | (0) |
| 1995 | Kolos 2 Krasnodar | 2 | (0) |
| 1996 | Kolos Krasnodar | 2 | (0) |
| 1996–1997 | Mykolaiv | 2 | (0) |
| 1997–1998 | Zirka Smila | 5 | (0) |
| 1998–1999 | Cherkasy | 6 | (0) |

International career
| 1992 | Kyrgyzstan | 1 | (0) |
- * Club domestic league appearances and goals as of 22 January 2022

Stanislav Tyulenev (Ukrainian: Станіслав Олександрович Тюленєв; born 2 January 1973) is a Kyrgyz former professional footballer who played as a goalkeeper.

== Career ==
Pupil of Alga Bishkek. In 1991-1992 he played for the team of his hometown Alga Bishkek, with which in 1992 he won the first independent Kyrgyzstan League of Kyrgyzstan. In 1993 he moved to the Ukrainian club Dnipro Cherkasy in Ukrainian Second League. With the Cherkasy team he won the Ukrainian Second League in the season 1992–93 and won the right to play in the Ukrainian First League. For three incomplete seasons in Cherkasy, Tyulenev could not get the place of the main goalkeeper, he played in only 23 matches. Since 1994 he played in the teams Desna Chernihiv, Kolos Krasnodar, Mykolaiv, but not in any of these teams also did not become the main goalkeeper. In 1998 he returned to Dnipro Cherkasy, where he ended his career.

== National team ==
He played 1 friendly match for Kyrgyzstan. On September 26, 1992, he played 90 minutes in Bishkek against Kazakhstan.

== Honours ==
Alga Bishkek

- Kyrgyzstan League: 1992
- Kyrgyzstan Cup: 1992

Dnipro Cherkasy

- Ukrainian Second League: 1992–93
