= Ruslan Hilazyev =

Ukrainian football player (born 1977)

Personal information
- Full name: Ruslan Nakifovych Hilazyev
- Date of birth: 7 January 1977 (age 49)
- Place of birth: Odesa, Ukrainian SSR
- Height: 1.78 m (5 ft 10 in)
- Position: Midfielder

Team information
- Current team: Chornomorets Odesa (sporting director)

Senior career*
Years	Team	Apps	(Gls)
1995–1996	Dynamo-Flesh Odesa	55	(0)
1996–1998	Desna Chernihiv	66	(5)
1998–2001	Zimbru Chișinău	56	(7)
2001–2008	Chornomorets Odesa	145	(8)
2001–2004	Chornomorets-2 Odesa	5	(0)
2007–2008	→ Dnister Ovidiopol (loan)	24	(3)
Total		330	(23)

Managerial career
- 2009–2010: Chornomorets Odesa (U21)
- 2017–: Chornomorets Odesa (sporting director)
- * Club domestic league appearances and goals

Ruslan Nakifovych Hilazyev (Ukrainian: Руслан Накіфович Гілазєв, born 7 January 1977) is a Ukrainian retired professional footballer who played as a midfielder and manager.

== Career ==
He is the product of the Chornomorets Odesa Youth Team. He started his career at the local Dynamo-Flash at that time playing the Second League. Later he moved to Moldova to play for Zimbru Chișinău and then back to Ukraine in Desna Chernihiv. Ruslan Hilazyev returned to his home town to play for Chornomorets Odesa in 2001. While playing to Moldova, Hilazyev helped Zimbru Chișinău to bring two league Divizia Naţională titles. In Chornomorets during the 2005–06 season, Ruslan Hilazyev helped the club achieve a bronze spot in the Ukrainian Championship.

=== Honors ===
Team

- Moldovan National Division: 1998–99 (1st), 1999–2000 (1st)
- Ukrainian Premier League: 2005–06 (3rd)
