= Hennadiy Lahomyna =

Ukrainian footballer

Gennadiy Lagomina
Personal information
- Date of birth: 9 September 1973 (age 53)
- Place of birth: Ukrainian SSR, USSR
- Height: 1.84 m (6 ft 1/2 in)
- Position: Forward

Senior career*
| Years | Team | Apps | (Gls) |
| 1992 | Zirka Kropyvnytskyi | 6 | (0) |
| 1993–1994 | Kirovets Makiivka | 20 | (0) |
| 1994–1995 | Silur Khartsyzsk | 10 | (0) |
| 1994–1996 | Desna Chernihiv | 31 | (1) |
| 1996 | Industriya Borovsk | 38 | (4) |
| 1997 | Spartak Ryazan | 5 | (0) |
| 1998 | Neftyanik Bugulma | 6 | (5) |
| 1999 | Spartak Lukhovitsy | 1 | (0) |
- * Club domestic league appearances and goals as of 20 January 2022

Gennadiy Lagomina (Ukrainian: Лагомина Геннадий Станиславович) is a Ukrainian retired footballer.

== Career ==
Gennadiy Lagomina started his career in 1992 with Zirka Kropyvnytskyi. In 1993 he played 20 matches for one season with Kirovets Makiivka. In 1994 he moved to Silur Khartsyzsk where he played 10 matches and then he moved to Desna Chernihiv in Chernihiv, here he stayed until 1996 playing 31 matches and scored 1 goal. In 1996 he moved to Industriya Borovsk in Russia in the Russian Second Division. In 1997 he moved to Spartak Ryazan in the Russian First Division playing 5 matches and in 1998 he played 6 matches scoring 5 goals with Neftyanik Bugulma in the Russian Amateur Football League. In 1999 he played 1 match for Spartak Lukhovitsy.
