= Trudovi Reservy Stadium =

Sports stadium

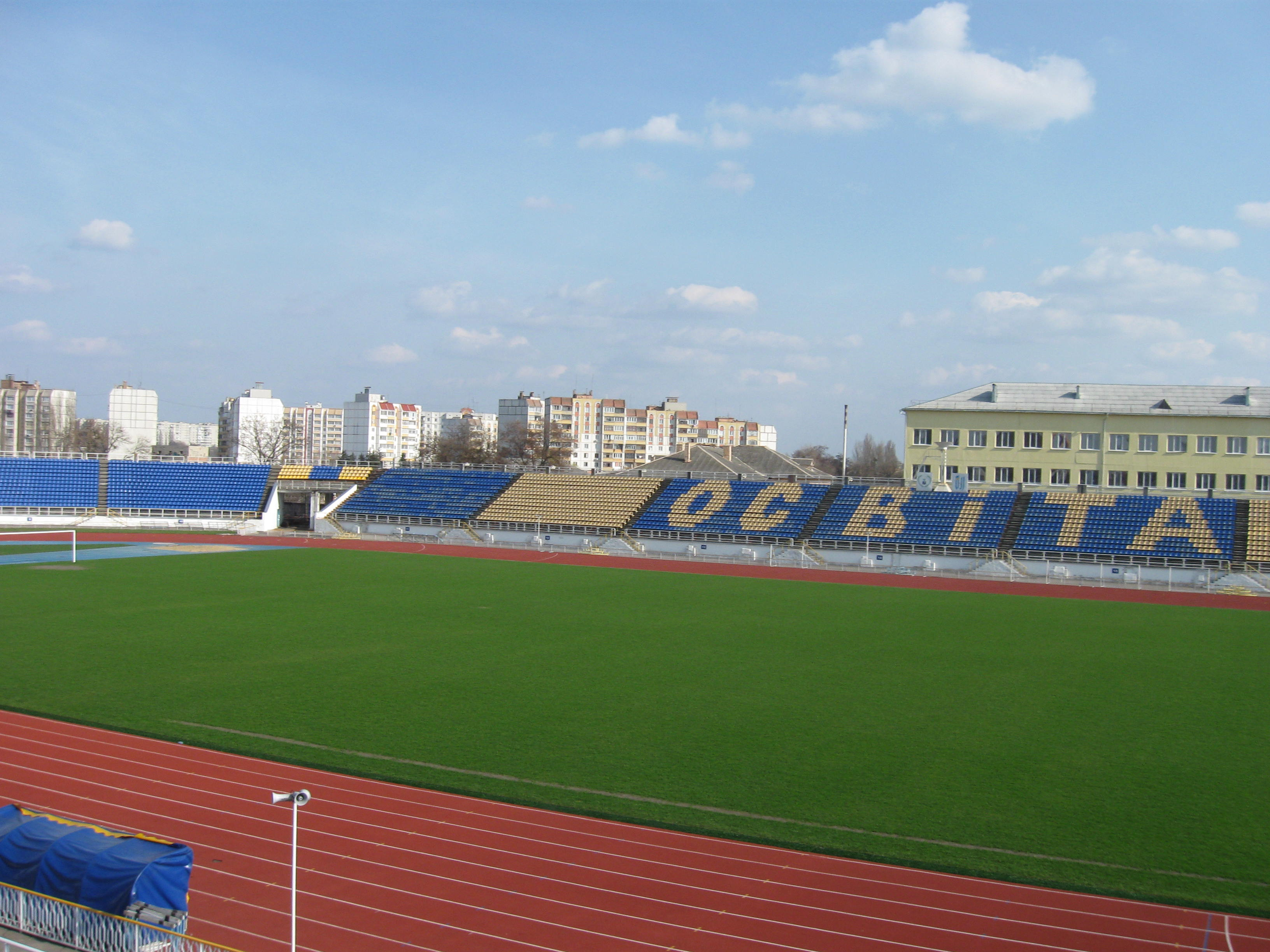
- Interactive map of Trudovi Reservy Stadium
- Location: Bila Tserkva, Ukraine
- Coordinates: 49°47′38″N 30°07′23″E
- Owner: Ministry of Education and Science
- Capacity: 13,500 (football)
- Surface: Grass
- Field size: 104m x 72m

Tenants
- FC Ros Bila Tserkva; FC Arsenal-Kyivshchyna Bila Tserkva

Trudovi Reservy Stadium (Ukrainian: Стадіон «Трудові резерви») is a football stadium in Bila Tserkva, Ukraine. The stadium is a home arena for FC Arsenal-Kyivshchyna Bila Tserkva. Following the 2022 Russian invasion of Ukraine, the fate of the stadium was unknown.
