= Andriy Zakharov (footballer) =

Ukrainian footballer

Personal information
- Full name: Andriy Oleksandrovych Zakharov
- Date of birth: 22 December 1968 (age 57)
- Place of birth: Chernihiv, Ukrainian SSR
- Height: 1.84 m (6 ft 0 in)
- Position: Defender

Senior career*
Years	Team	Apps	(Gls)
1993–1994	Vorskla Poltava	24	(2)
1994–1995	Vodnyk Kherson	4	(0)
1995–1996	Desna Chernihiv	2	(0)
1995–1996	Fakel Varva	0	(0)
1996–1997	Dzharylhach Skadovsk	0	(0)
- * Club domestic league appearances and goals as of 21 January 2022

Andriy Oleksandrovych Zakharov (Ukrainian: Андрій Олександрович Захаров; born 22 December 1968) is a Ukrainian retired footballer.

== Career ==
He started his career in 1993 with Vorskla Poltava in the Ukrainian First League. In 1994 he moved to Vodnik Kherson where he played 4 matches. In 1995 he moved to Desna Chernihiv in the Ukrainian Second League. In 1996 he moved to Fakel Varva in the city of Varva which was playing in Chernihiv Oblast Football Championship but he didn't play a single match. In the same season he moved to Dzharylhach Skadovsk without playing and then he ended his career.
