= Petro Komanda =

Soviet footballer

Personal information
- Full name: Петро Євгенійович Команда
- Date of birth: 10 July 1968 (age 58)
- Place of birth: Chernihiv, Ukrainian SSR, USSR
- Height: 1.84 m (6 ft 0 in)
- Position: Midfielder

Senior career*
Years	Team	Apps	(Gls)
1995–1986	Desna Chernihiv	5	(0)
1992–1994	Cheksyl Chernihiv	23	(0)
1994–1996	Desna Chernihiv	65	(1)
1996–1999	Domostroitel Chernihiv	21	(4)
- * Club domestic league appearances and goals as of 15 January 2022

Petro Komanda (Ukrainian: Петро Євгенійович Команда) is a retired Soviet and Ukrainian football player.

== Career ==
Petro Komanda started his career in 1985 with Desna Chernihiv, where he played 5 matches, then in 1992 he moved to Cheksyl Chernihiv, another team in the city of Chernihiv. In 1992 he moved to Cheksyl Chernihiv, where he won the Chernihiv Oblast Football Championship and the Chernihiv Oblast Football Cup in 1992. Then he returned to Desna Chernihiv and in 1993 he moved to Cheksyl Chernihiv for one season where he played 12 matches. In 1994 he returned to Desna Chernihiv for two season where he played 65 and scored 1 goal.

== Honours ==
Khimik Chernihiv

- Chernihiv Oblast Football Championship: 1992
- Chernihiv Oblast Football Cup: 1992
