= 1996–97 Ukrainian Second League =

Ukrainian Second League
- Season: 1996–97
- Champions: (A) - Desna Chernihiv (B) - Avanhard-Inter Rovenky

The 1996–97 Ukrainian Second League was the sixth season of 3rd level professional football in Ukraine. The competition commenced on 10 August 1996 and ended on 21 June 1997.

== Teams ==
=== Promoted teams ===
Six teams have been promoted from the 1995–96 Ukrainian Football Amateur League:

- Pokuttya Kolomyia - Group 1 winner (debut)
- Papirnyk Malyn - Group 3 winner (debut)
- Fakel Varva - Group 4 winner (debut)
- Lokomotyv Smila - Group 3 runner-up (debut)
- Avanhard Merefa - Group 4 third (debut)
- Portovyk Kerch - Group 6 winner (debut)

Two teams were added also without participation in the Ukrainian Football Amateur League:

- Nyva Bershad - undetermined (debut), supposedly instead of Sportinvest Kryvyi Rin (withdrew at the last season winter break, yet placed above the 18th position)
- FC Petrivtsi - undetermined (debut)

=== Relegated teams ===
Two teams have been relegated from the 1995–96 Ukrainian First League:

- Ratusha Kamyanets-Podilskyi – 21st place (debut)
- Skala Stryi – 22nd place (debut)

=== Withdrawn teams ===
- Ratusha Kamyanets-Podilskyi
- Skala Stryi
- Chayka Sevastopol
- Druzhba Berdiansk
- Dnistrovets Bilhorod-Dnistrovskyi
- Nyva-Kosmos Myronivka
- Avanhard Zhydachiv

=== Merged and renamed teams ===
- Skhid Slavutch changed its name to Nerafa Slavutych.
- Khutrovyk Tysmenytsia changed its name to FC Tysmenytsia.
- Obolon Kyiv changed its name to Obolon-PPO Kyiv in cooperation with the Ukrainian Armed Forces (PPO is an abbreviation for Anti-Air Defense).
- During winter break, Avanhard Merefa moved to Kharkiv and changed its name to Avanhard-Metalist Kharkiv.

=== Location map ===
Locations of team home grounds in Ukrainian Second League 1996-97

== Group A ==
=== Final standings ===
Pos	Team	Pld	W	D	L	GF	GA	GD	Pts	Promotion or relegation
1	Desna Chernihiv (C, P)	30	20	6	4	39	12	+27	66	Promoted to Persha Liha
2	Fakel Varva	30	18	7	5	40	20	+20	61	
3	Tysmenytsia	30	17	7	6	41	21	+20	58	
4	Obolon-PPO Kyiv	30	15	11	4	34	17	+17	56	
5	Karpaty Mukacheve	30	15	7	8	43	24	+19	52	
6	Halychyna Drohobych	30	12	10	8	34	27	+7	46	
7	Pokuttia Kolomyia	30	12	8	10	21	29	−8	44	
8	Systema-Boreks Borodianka	30	11	8	11	28	31	−3	41	
9	Nyva Bershad	30	11	6	13	31	36	−5	39	second team of Nyva Vinnytsia
10	Haray Zhovkva	30	10	7	13	29	28	+1	37	
11	Kalush	30	9	8	13	32	29	+3	35	
12	Hazovyk Komarno	30	9	7	14	23	26	−3	34	
13	Papirnyk Malyn	30	8	7	15	16	32	−16	31	
14	Nerafa Slavutych	30	8	3	19	24	56	−32	27	
15	Ros Bila Tserkva	30	6	4	20	14	49	−35	22	Avoided relegation (Note: FC Ros Bila Tserkva was allowed to stay, but was reformed into FC Ryhonda for the next season.)
16	Keramik Baranivka (D)	30	4	4	22	15	27	−12	16	Withdrew (Note: FC Keramik Baranivka stopped its participation after the first half.)

Source: uafootball.net.ua
(C) Champions; (D) Disqualified; (P) Promoted

=== Top goalscorers ===
	Scorer	Goals (Pen.)	Team
1	Orest Atamanchuk	11 (3)	Tysmenytsia
2	Volodymyr Kryzhanivsky	10	Kalush
2	Yuriy Ovcharenko	10	Ros / Desna
4	Valeriy Sanytsky	9	Fakel Varva
5	Vasyl Klymko	8	Halychyna Drohobych
5	Petro Pylypeiko	8	Desna Chernihiv
5	Oleksandr Shevchenko	8	Nyva Bershad

== Group B ==
=== Final standings ===
Pos	Team	Pld	W	D	L	GF	GA	GD	Pts	Promotion or relegation
1	Avanhard-Industria Rovenky (C, P)	32	24	4	4	50	17	+33	76	Promoted to Persha Liha
2	Tytan Armyansk	32	17	6	9	51	29	+22	57	
3	Oskil Kupiansk	32	15	10	7	38	23	+15	55	
4	Petrivtsi	32	15	8	9	46	36	+10	53	
5	Metalurh Novomoskovsk	32	15	5	12	52	34	+18	50	
6	Krystal Kherson	32	13	8	11	44	34	+10	47	
7	Shakhtar Stakhanov	32	14	4	14	42	42	0	46	
8	Viktor Zaporizhzhia	32	12	8	12	46	48	−2	44	
9	Shakhtar-2 Donetsk	32	10	11	11	43	39	+4	41	
10	Torpedo Melitopol	32	9	14	9	26	32	−6	41	
11	Portovyk Illichivsk	32	11	7	14	27	28	−1	40	
12	Olimpia FC AES	32	9	12	11	25	33	−8	39	
13	Lokomotyv Smila	32	9	10	13	29	37	−8	37	
14	Hirnyk-Sport Komsomolsk	32	10	6	16	20	32	−12	36	
15	Avanhard-Metalist Merefa (Note: Avanhard-Metalist Merefa in the first half of the season was called Avanhard Merefa.)	32	9	6	17	24	49	−25	33	
16	Dynamo Saky (R)	32	8	8	16	23	43	−20	32	Relegated
17	Portovyk Kerch (D)	32	6	5	21	27	57	−30	23	Dissolved (Note: Portovyk Kerch became the third post Soviet club that was relegated to amateurs.)

Source: uafootball.net.ua
(C) Champions; (D) Disqualified; (P) Promoted; (R) Relegated

=== Top goalscorers ===
	Scorer	Goals (Pen.)	Team
1	Ihor Tolstov	15 (3)	Hirnyk-Sport / Petrivtsi
2	Oleh Pokusa	13	Metalurh Novomoskovsk
3	Kostyantyn Vizyonok	12 (1)	Tytan Armyansk
4	Oleksandr Kryvoruchko	11	Oskil Kupiansk
4	Oleksandr Lyubynsky	11 (5)	Krystal Kherson

== See also ==
- 1996–97 Ukrainian Premier League
- 1996–97 Ukrainian First League
- 1996–97 Ukrainian Cup
