= FC Slavutych =

Slavutych
- Full name: Football Club Slavutych
- Founded: 1994
- Dissolved: 1998
- Ground: Kaskad Stadium, Slavutych, Ukraine
- Coordinates: 51°31′26.9″N 30°45′19.8″E
Home colours	Away colours

Slavutych Football Club (Ukrainian: Футбольний Клуб «Славутич», romanized: Futbol'nyy Klub "Slavutych") was a Ukrainian football club from Slavutych, Kyiv Oblast. Founded in 1994, it participated in professional competitions in 1995–1998 spending three seasons in the Ukrainian Second League.

== History ==
=== Overview ===
The first football activities in the city started in 1987, just after its foundation to replace Pripyat, abandoned after the Chernobyl disaster of 1986. The football club Stroitel Pripyat, founded in 1970s, was renamed "Stroitel Slavutych", and ceased its activities after the end of 1988 season.

The club joined competitions four rounds before the end of the 1994-95 Ukrainian Third League season replacing the bankrupted club FC Transimpeks Vyshneve which after its merge with FC Ros Bila Tserkva it moved to the town of Trezyne near Bila Tserkva.

=== Name ===
- 1995–1996 FC Skhid Slavutych
- 1996–1997 FC Nerafa Slavutych
- 1997–1998 FC Slavutych-ChAES Slavutych

== League and cup history ==
Season	Div.	Pos.	Pl.	W	D	L	GS	GA	P	Domestic Cup	Europe	Notes
1994–95	4	15	42	14	9	19	35	51	51			

== See also ==
- FC Stroitel Pripyat
- List of football clubs in Ukraine
