= 1999–2000 FC Desna Chernihiv season =

FC Desna Chernihiv
1999–00 season
- President: Ivan Chaus
- Manager: Vadym Lazorenko
- Stadium: Chernihiv Stadium
- Ukrainian Second League: 9th
- Ukrainian Cup: 1/16 finals Second League Cup
- Top goalscorer: League: Yuriy Yakovenko (5); All: Yuriy Yakovenko (5)
Home colours	Away colours

For the 1999–2000 season, FC Desna Chernihiv competed in the Ukrainian Second League.

== Players ==
=== Squad information ===
As of 19 July 2020

Squad no.	Name	Nationality	Position	Date of birth (age)
Goalkeepers
35	Maksym Tatarenko ^{List B}	(Ukraine)	GK	7 May 1999 (aged 21)
44	Yevhen Past	(Ukraine)	GK	16 March 1988 (aged 32)
72	Ihor Lytovka	(Ukraine)	GK	5 June 1988 (aged 32)
Defenders
4	Joonas Tamm	(Estonia)	DF	2 February 1992 (aged 28)
5	Vitaliy Yermakov	(Ukraine)	DF	7 June 1992 (aged 28)
17	Andriy Hitchenko	(Ukraine)	DF	2 October 1984 (aged 35)
22	Andriy Mostovyi	(Ukraine)	DF	24 January 1988 (aged 32)
26	Yukhym Konoplya ^{List B} (on loan from Shakhtar Donetsk)	(Ukraine)	DF	26 August 1999 (aged 20)
32	Maksym Imerekov	(Ukraine)	DF	23 January 1991 (aged 29)
43	Artur Zapadnya	(Ukraine)	DF	4 June 1990 (aged 30)
45	Denys Favorov (Captain)	(Ukraine)	DF	1 April 1991 (aged 29)
Midfielders
7	Vladyslav Ohirya	(Ukraine)	MF	3 April 1990 (aged 30)
8	Andriy Dombrovskyi	(Ukraine)	MF	12 August 1995 (aged 24)
9	Levan Arveladze	(Ukraine) (Georgia (country))	MF	6 April 1993 (aged 27)
11	Vladyslav Kalitvintsev	(Ukraine)	MF	4 January 1993 (aged 27)
12	Yehor Kartushov	(Ukraine)	MF	5 January 1991 (aged 29)
14	Andriy Yakymiv ^{List B}	(Ukraine)	MF	15 June 1997 (aged 23)
16	Yevheniy Belych ^{List B}	(Ukraine)	MF	9 January 2001 (aged 19)
20	Andriy Totovytskyi	(Ukraine)	MF	20 January 1993 (aged 27)
25	Oleksiy Hutsulyak	(Ukraine)	MF	25 December 1997 (aged 22)
27	Serhiy Starenkyi	(Ukraine)	MF	20 September 1984 (aged 35)
77	Orest Kuzyk	(Ukraine)	MF	17 May 1995 (aged 25)
Forwards
10	Oleksandr Filippov	(Ukraine)	FW	23 October 1992 (aged 27)
13	Dmytro Khlyobas	(Ukraine)	FW	9 May 1994 (aged 26)
28	Pylyp Budkivskyi	(Ukraine)	FW	10 March 1992 (aged 28)

== Transfers ==
=== In ===
Date	Pos.	Player	Age	Moving from	Type	Fee	Source
Summer
15 June 1999	GK	(Ukraine) Yuriy Melashenko	20	(Ukraine) Bukovyna Chernivtsi	Transfer	Free	
15 June 2000	DF	(Ukraine) Viktor Zapara	20	(Kazakhstan) Ordabasy	Transfer	Free	
15 June 1999	DF	(Ukraine) Volodymyr Kolomiets	20	Unattached	Transfer	Free	
15 June 1999	DF	(Ukraine) Maksym Markelov	20	(Ukraine) SDYuShOR Desna	Transfer	Free	
15 June 1999	DF	(Ukraine) Igor Zhornyak	20	(Ukraine) Fortuna Cheksyl Chernihiv	Transfer	Free	
15 June 1999	DF	(Ukraine) Oleksandr Lepekho	20	(Belarus) Torpedo Mogilev	Transfer	Free	
15 June 1999	MF	(Ukraine) Vadym Postovoy	20	(Ukraine) Cheksyl Chernihiv	Transfer	Free	
15 June 1999	MF	(Ukraine) Vladimir Matsuta	20	(Ukraine) Fortuna Cheksyl Chernihiv	Transfer	Free	
Winter
15 January 2000	DF	(Ukraine) Oleksandr Malevanov	20	(Ukraine) Monolith Konstantinovka	Transfer	Free	
15 January 2000	FW	(Ukraine) Volodymyr Avramenko	20	(Ukraine) Systema-Boreks Borodianka	Transfer	Free	

=== Out ===
Date	Pos.	Player	Age	Moving to	Type	Fee	Source
Summer
15 June 1999	GK	(Ukraine) Yuriy Ovcharov	20	(Ukraine) Polissya Zhytomyr	Transfer	Free	
15 June 1999	GK	(Ukraine) Ihor Krapyvkin	20	(Ukraine) Bukovyna Chernivtsi	Transfer	Free	
15 June 1999	DF	(Ukraine) Serhiy Sapronov	20	Unattached	Transfer	Free	
15 June 1999	DF	(Ukraine) Vladimir Drobot	20	Unattached	Transfer	Free	
15 June 1999	DF	(Ukraine) Ihor Zelenyuk	20	(Ukraine) Mykolaiv	Transfer	Free	
15 June 1999	DF	(Ukraine) Bohdan Husak	20	(Ukraine) Kremin Kremenchuk	Transfer	Free	
15 June 1999	DF	(Ukraine) Yaroslav Zaiats	20	Unattached	Transfer	Free	
15 June 1999	DF	(Ukraine) Valeriy Zhogolko	20	(Ukraine) Slavyanets Konotop	Transfer	Free	
15 June 1999	MF	(Ukraine) Zinoviy Vasyliv	20	(Ukraine) Vinnytsia	Transfer	Free	
15 June 1999	FW	(Georgia (country)) Gocha Gogokhia	20	(Ukraine) FC Nizhyn	Transfer	Free	
Winter
15 January 2000	MF	(Ukraine) Oleksandr Babor	20	(Ukraine) Ros Bila Tserkva	Transfer	Free	
15 January 2000	MF	(Ukraine) Vladimir Matsuta	20	(Ukraine) Ros Bila Tserkva	Transfer	Free	
15 January 2000	FW	(Ukraine) Yuriy Bondarenko	20	(Ukraine) FC Nizhyn	Transfer	Free	

== Statistics ==
=== Appearances and goals ===
No.	Pos	Nat	Player	Total		Premier League		Cup	
No.	Pos	Nat	Player	Apps	Goals	Apps	Goals	Apps	Goals
Goalkeepers
	GK	(Ukraine) UKR	Yuriy Melashenko	11	0	11	0	0	0
	GK	(Ukraine) UKR	Oleksandr Mitko	6	0	6	0	0	0
	GK	(Ukraine) UKR	Viktor Litvin	7	0	7	0	0	0
Defenders
	DF	(Ukraine) UKR	Maksym Markelov	3	0	3	0	0	0
	DF	(Ukraine) UKR	Andrey Kislenko	2	0	2	0	0	0
	DF	(Georgia (country)) GEO	Kakhaberi Sartania	13	1	13	1	0	0
	DF	(Ukraine) UKR	Oleh Ivashchenko	8	0	8	0	0	0
	DF	(Ukraine) UKR	Igor Zhornyak	8	0	8	0	0	0
	DF	(Ukraine) UKR	Oleksandr Lepekho	14	0	14	0	0	0
	DF	(Ukraine) UKR	Oleksandr Alekseenko	7	0	7	0	0	0
	DF	(Ukraine) UKR	Vadim Danilevskiy	10	0	10	0	0	0
	DF	(Ukraine) UKR	Valeriy Zhogolko	11	0	11	0	0	0
	DF	(Ukraine) UKR	Andrey Kislenko	2	0	2	0	0	0
	DF	(Ukraine) UKR	Vladislav Nitskiy	11	1	11	1	0	0
	DF	(Ukraine) UKR	Konstantin Poznyak	22	1	22	1	0	0
	DF	(Ukraine) UKR	Andrey Polyanitsa	17	0	17	0	0	0
	DF	(Ukraine) UKR	Ruslan Popov	18	1	18	1	0	0
	DF	(Ukraine) UKR	Oleksandr Selivanov	13	2	13	2	0	0
	DF	(Ukraine) UKR	Yevgeniy Tsepkalo	11	2	11	2	0	0
	DF	(Ukraine) UKR	Valeriy Chornyi	0	0	0	0	0	0
	DF	(Ukraine) UKR	Viktor Zapara	8	1	8	1	0	0
Midfielders
	MF	(Ukraine) UKR	Artem Perevozchikov	11	0	11	0	0	0
	MF	(Ukraine) UKR	Serhiy Sapronov	13	0	13	0	0	0
	MF	(Ukraine) UKR	Volodymyr Avramenko	11	5	11	5	0	0
	MF	(Ukraine) UKR	Vadym Postovoy	11	1	11	1	0	0
	MF	(Ukraine) UKR	Oleksandr Babor	8	0	8	0	0	0
	MF	(Ukraine) UKR	Oleksandr Danilenko	0	0	0	0	0	0
	MF	(Ukraine) UKR	Ihor Lyashenko	11	0	11	0	0	0
	MF	(Ukraine) UKR	Oleksandr Timoshevskiy	2	0	2	0	0	0
	MF	(Ukraine) UKR	Oleksandr Tsybenko	12	0	12	0	0	0
	MF	(Ukraine) UKR	Sergey Shurkhal	9	0	9	0	0	0
	MF	(Ukraine) UKR	Volodymyr Matsuta	13	0	13	0	0	0
Forwards
	FW	(Ukraine) UKR	Oleksandr Kozhemyachenko	23	5	23	5	0	0
	FW	(Ukraine) UKR	Yuriy Yakovenko	11	5	11	5	0	0
	FW	(Ukraine) UKR	Peter Pilipeyko	12	3	12	3	0	0
	FW	(Ukraine) UKR	Sergey Alayev	2	0	2	0	0	0
Players transferred out during the season
	MF	(Ukraine) UKR	Volodymyr Matsuta	13	0	13	0	0	0

Source: Competitions

Last updated: 9 May 2021

=== Goalscorers ===
Rank	No.	Pos	Nat	Name	Premier League	Cup	Europa League	Total
1		FW	(Ukraine)	Oleksandr Kozhemyachenko	5	0	0	5
1		MF	(Ukraine)	Volodymyr Avramenko	5	0	0	5
1		FW	(Ukraine)	Yuriy Yakovenko	5	0	0	5
2		FW	(Ukraine)	Peter Pilipeyko	3	0	0	3
3		DF	(Ukraine)	Oleksandr Selivanov	2	0	0	2
3		DF	(Ukraine)	Yevgeniy Tsepkalo	2	0	0	2
4		DF	(Georgia (country))	Kakhaberi Sartania	1	0	0	1
4		DF	(Ukraine)	Konstantin Poznyak	1	0	0	1
4		DF	(Ukraine)	Vadym Postovoy	1	0	0	1
4		DF	(Ukraine)	Vladislav Nitskiy	1	0	0	1
4		DF	(Ukraine)	Ruslan Popov	1	0	0	1
4		DF	(Ukraine)	Viktor Zapara	1	0	0	1
				Total	28	0	0	28

Last updated: 31 May 2019
