= 2001–02 FC Desna Chernihiv season =

FC Desna Chernihiv
2001–02 season
- President: Ivan Chaus
- Manager: Vadym Lazorenko
- Stadium: Chernihiv Stadium
- Ukrainian Second League: 4th
- Ukrainian Cup: Round 1
- Top goalscorer: League: Oleksandr Kozhemyachenko (15); All: Oleksandr Kozhemyachenko (15)
Home colours	Away colours

For the 2001–02 season, FC Desna Chernihiv competed in the Ukrainian Second League.

== Players ==
=== Squad information ===
As of 19 July 2020

Squad no.	Name	Nationality	Position	Date of birth (age)
Goalkeepers
35	Maksym Tatarenko ^{List B}	(Ukraine)	GK	7 May 1999 (aged 21)
44	Yevhen Past	(Ukraine)	GK	16 March 1988 (aged 32)
72	Ihor Lytovka	(Ukraine)	GK	5 June 1988 (aged 32)
Defenders
4	Joonas Tamm	(Estonia)	DF	2 February 1992 (aged 28)
5	Vitaliy Yermakov	(Ukraine)	DF	7 June 1992 (aged 28)
17	Andriy Hitchenko	(Ukraine)	DF	2 October 1984 (aged 35)
22	Andriy Mostovyi	(Ukraine)	DF	24 January 1988 (aged 32)
26	Yukhym Konoplya ^{List B} (on loan from Shakhtar Donetsk)	(Ukraine)	DF	26 August 1999 (aged 20)
32	Maksym Imerekov	(Ukraine)	DF	23 January 1991 (aged 29)
43	Artur Zapadnya	(Ukraine)	DF	4 June 1990 (aged 30)
45	Denys Favorov (Captain)	(Ukraine)	DF	1 April 1991 (aged 29)
Midfielders
7	Vladyslav Ohirya	(Ukraine)	MF	3 April 1990 (aged 30)
8	Andriy Dombrovskyi	(Ukraine)	MF	12 August 1995 (aged 24)
9	Levan Arveladze	(Ukraine) (Georgia (country))	MF	6 April 1993 (aged 27)
11	Vladyslav Kalitvintsev	(Ukraine)	MF	4 January 1993 (aged 27)
12	Yehor Kartushov	(Ukraine)	MF	5 January 1991 (aged 29)
14	Andriy Yakymiv ^{List B}	(Ukraine)	MF	15 June 1997 (aged 23)
16	Yevheniy Belych ^{List B}	(Ukraine)	MF	9 January 2001 (aged 19)
20	Andriy Totovytskyi	(Ukraine)	MF	20 January 1993 (aged 27)
25	Oleksiy Hutsulyak	(Ukraine)	MF	25 December 1997 (aged 22)
27	Serhiy Starenkyi	(Ukraine)	MF	20 September 1984 (aged 35)
77	Orest Kuzyk	(Ukraine)	MF	17 May 1995 (aged 25)
Forwards
10	Oleksandr Filippov	(Ukraine)	FW	23 October 1992 (aged 27)
13	Dmytro Khlyobas	(Ukraine)	FW	9 May 1994 (aged 26)
28	Pylyp Budkivskyi	(Ukraine)	FW	10 March 1992 (aged 28)

== Transfers ==
=== In ===
Date	Pos.	Player	Age	Moving from	Type	Fee	Source
Summer
15 June 2001	GK	(Ukraine) Yuriy Ovcharov	20	(Ukraine) Polissya Zhytomyr	Transfer	Free	
15 June 2001	GK	(Ukraine) Viktor Litvin	20	(Ukraine) FC Nizhyn	Loan Return	Free	
15 June 2001	DF	(Ukraine) Volodymyr Kulyk	20	(Ukraine) Elektron Romny	Transfer	Free	
15 June 2001	DF	(Ukraine) Oleh Sobekh	20	(Ukraine) Volyn Lutsk	Transfer	Free	
15 June 2001	MF	(Ukraine) Oleksandr Babor	20	(Ukraine) Ros Bila Tserkva	Transfer	Free	
15 June 2001	MF	(Ukraine) Ihor Bobovych	20	(Ukraine) Polissya Zhytomyr	Transfer	Free	
15 June 2001	MF	(Ukraine) Oleksandr Savenchuk	20	(Ukraine) Nizhyn	Transfer	Free	
15 June 2001	FW	(Ukraine) Eldar Allakhverdiyev	20	(Ukraine) Ros Bila Tserkva	Transfer	Free	
Winter
15 January 2002	DF	(Ukraine) Oleksandr Malevanov	20	(Ukraine) Monolith Konstantinovka	Transfer	Free	
15 January 2002	DF	(Ukraine) Oleksandr Selivanov	20	(Ukraine) Yevropa Pryluky	Transfer	Free	
15 January 2002	MF	(Azerbaijan) Vladislav Nosenko	20	(Latvia) Dinaburg	Transfer	Free	
15 January 2002	MF	(Ukraine) Oleh Fedoruk	20	(Ukraine) Fortuna Sharhorod	Transfer	Free	

=== Out ===
Date	Pos.	Player	Age	Moving to	Type	Fee	Source
Summer
15 June 2001	DF	(Ukraine) Vadym Postovoy	20	(Ukraine) Mena	Transfer	Free	
15 June 2001	DF	(Ukraine) Oleksandr Selivanov	20	(Ukraine) Yevropa Pryluky	Transfer	Free	
15 June 2001	DF	(Ukraine) Ruslan Popov	20	(Ukraine) Spartak Sumy	Transfer	Free	
15 June 2001	FW	(Ukraine) Volodymyr Vanin	20	Unattached	Transfer	Free	
Winter
15 January 2002	DF	(Ukraine) Oleksandr Lepekho	20	(Ukraine) FC Nizhyn	Transfer	Free	
15 January 2002	MF	(Ukraine) Oleksandr Babor	20	(Ukraine) Ros Bila Tserkva	Transfer	Free	
15 January 2002	FW	(Ukraine) Yuriy Bondarenko	20	(Ukraine) FC Nizhyn	Transfer	Free	
15 July 2002	FW	(Ukraine) Yuriy Yakovenko	20	(Ukraine) Sokil Zolochiv	Transfer	Free	

== Statistics ==
=== Appearances and goals ===
No.	Pos	Nat	Player	Total		Premier League		Cup	
No.	Pos	Nat	Player	Apps	Goals	Apps	Goals	Apps	Goals
Goalkeepers
	GK	(Ukraine) UKR	Yuriy Melashenko	34	0	34	0	0	0
	GK	(Ukraine) UKR	Yuriy Ovcharov	1	0	1	0	0	0
	GK	(Ukraine) UKR	Artem Padun	0	0	0	0	0	0
	GK	(Ukraine) UKR	Andriy Huz	0	0	0	0	0	0
Defenders
	DF	(Ukraine) UKR	Maksym Markelov	5	0	5	0	0	0
	DF	(Ukraine) UKR	Oleksandr Lepekho	13	0	13	0	0	0
	DF	(Ukraine) UKR	Oleksandr Malevanov	16	0	16	0	0	0
	DF	(Ukraine) UKR	Volodymyr Kulyk	14	1	14	1	0	0
	DF	(Georgia (country)) GEO	Vitaly Navrozashvili	12	0	12	0	0	0
	DF	(Ukraine) UKR	Oleh Sobekh	24	1	24	1	0	0
	DF	(Ukraine) UKR	Konstantin Poznyak	29	0	29	0	0	0
	DF	(Ukraine) UKR	Andrey Polyanitsa	29	2	29	2	0	0
	DF	(Ukraine) UKR	Oleksandr Selivanov	0	0	0	0	0	0
Midfielders
	MF	(Ukraine) UKR	Volodymyr Avramenko	34	11	34	11	0	0
	MF	(Ukraine) UKR	Yuriy Bondarenko	31	1	31	1	0	0
	MF	(Azerbaijan) AZE	Vladislav Nosenko	11	0	11	0	0	0
	MF	(Ukraine) UKR	Oleh Fedoruk	7	0	7	0	0	0
	MF	(Ukraine) UKR	Ihor Bobovych	13	1	13	1	0	0
	MF	(Ukraine) UKR	Oleksandr Savenchuk	32	8	32	8	0	0
	MF	(Ukraine) UKR	Oleksandr Babor	16	0	16	0	0	0
	MF	(Ukraine) UKR	Artem Perevozchikov	17	0	17	0	0	0
	MF	(Ukraine) UKR	Boris Shevelyuk	6	0	6	0	0	0
Forwards
	FW	(Ukraine) UKR	Oleksandr Kozhemyachenko	31	15	31	15	0	0
	FW	(Ukraine) UKR	Yuriy Yakovenko	16	7	16	7	0	0
	FW	(Ukraine) UKR	Volodymyr Vanin	0	0	0	0	0	0
	FW	(Ukraine) UKR	Eldar Allakhverdiyev	28	4	28	4	0	0
	FW	(Ukraine) UKR	Sergey Alayev	13	2	13	2	0	0

Source: Competitions

Last updated: 31 May 2019

=== Goalscorers ===
Rank	No.	Pos	Nat	Name	Premier League	Cup	Europa League	Total
1		FW	(Ukraine)	Oleksandr Kozhemyachenko	15	0	0	15
2		MF	(Ukraine)	Volodymyr Avramenko	11	0	0	11
3		MF	(Ukraine)	Oleksandr Savenchuk	8	0	0	8
4		FW	(Ukraine)	Yuriy Yakovenko	7	0	0	7
5		FW	(Ukraine)	Eldar Allakhverdiyev	4	0	0	4
6		FW	(Ukraine)	Sergey Alayev	2	0	0	2
7
7		DF	(Ukraine)	Oleh Sobekh	1	0	0	1
7		MF	(Ukraine)	Yuriy Bondarenko	1	0	0	1
7		MF	(Ukraine)	Ihor Bobovych	1	0	0	1
				Total	50	0	0	50

Last updated: 31 May 2019
