= 1997–98 FC Desna Chernihiv season =

FC Desna Chernihiv
1997–98 season
- President: Arkadiy Rynskyi
- Manager: Yukhym Shkolnykov
- Stadium: Chernihiv Stadium
- Ukrainian First League: 15th
- Ukrainian Cup: Round of 32 (1/16)
- Top goalscorer: League: Orest Atamanchuk (10); All: Yuriy Ovcharenko (13)
- Highest home attendance: 20000 (vs Mykolaiv, 11 May 1998)
- Lowest home attendance: 100 (vs CSCA-2 Kyiv , 26 June 1998)
- Biggest win: Desna Chernihiv 3-0 Avanhard-Industria Rovenky
- Biggest defeat: Volyn Lutsk 3-0 Desna Chernihiv
Home colours	Away colours

For the 1997–98 season, FC Desna Chernihiv competed in the Ukrainian First League. The club played its matches at the Chernihiv Stadium.

== Season summary ==
Yukhym Shkolnikov was confirmed as manager. In the summer transfer window, several players left the club, such as Ihor Krapyvkin, Yuriy Nadtochiy, Volodymyr Kulyk, Serhiy Zelinskyi, Andrey Krivenok and Serhiy Zgura. At the same time more players were added to the club like Dmytro Romanenko, Volodymyr Holovaty, Bohdan Husak, Yuriy Ovcharenko and Orest Atamanchuk. In the Ukrainian Cup the team eliminated Tsementnyk Mykolaiv and Dynamo-2 Kyiv before being eliminated by Metalurh Mariupol in the Round of 32. In the end of the season, the team finished the Ukrainian First League in 15th place, tied on points with Bukovyna Chernivtsi.

== Players ==
=== Squad information ===
As of 22 October 2026

Squad no.	Name	Nationality	Position	Date of birth (age)
Goalkeepers
	Yuriy Ovcharov	(Ukraine)	GK	19 March 1966 (aged 31)
	Ihor Khimanych	(Ukraine)	GK	11 May 1966 (aged 31)
	Oleksandr Mitko	(Ukraine)	GK	3 August 1974 (aged 22)
	Ihor Krapyvkin	(Ukraine)	GK	14 May 1966 (aged 31)
Defenders
	Yuriy Nadtochiy	(Ukraine)	DF	3 August 1964 (aged 32)
	Oleh Sobekh	(Ukraine)	DF	6 June 1976 (aged 21)
	Yaroslav Zayats	(Ukraine)	DF	8 December 1960 (aged 36)
	Kakhaberi Sartania	(Georgia (country))	DF	8 August 1967 (aged 29)
	Viktor Rudyi	(Ukraine)	DF	11 February 1962 (aged 35)
	Serhiy Sapronov	(Ukraine)	DF	21 October 1961 (aged 35)
	Oleh Ivashchenko	(Ukraine)	DF	5 May 1964 (aged 33)
	Volodymyr Kolomiets	(Ukraine)	DF	14 March 1974 (aged 23)
	Oleksandr Kormich	(Ukraine)	DF	2 October 1972 (aged 24)
	Vadym Danylevskyi	(Ukraine)	DF	9 April 1972 (aged 25)
	Valeriy Shapovalov	(Ukraine)	DF	27 August 1976 (aged 20)
	Dmytro Romanenko	(Ukraine)	DF	1 May 1980 (aged 17)
Midfielders
	Volodymyr Avramenko	(Ukraine)	MF	20 March 1974 (aged 23)
	Oleksandr Savenchuk	(Ukraine)	MF	9 May 1975 (aged 22)
	Ruslan Hilazyev	(Ukraine)	MF	7 January 1977 (aged 20)
	Ihor Bobovych	(Ukraine)	MF	18 November 1975 (aged 21)
	Vladimir Drobot	(Ukraine)	MF	2 August 1972 (aged 24)
	Igor Vysochansky	(Ukraine)	MF	3 May 1968 (aged 29)
	Ihor Lyashenko	(Ukraine)	MF	27 August 1972 (aged 24)
Forwards
	Andriy Borysyuk	(Ukraine)	FW	29 July 1975 (aged 21)
	Yuriy Ovcharenko	(Ukraine)	FW	25 April 1968 (aged 29)
	Petro Pylypeyko	(Ukraine)	FW	1 June 1968 (aged 29)
	Vladimir Martynov	(Kazakhstan)	FW	6 April 1976 (aged 21)

== Transfers ==
=== In ===
Date	Pos.	Player	Age	Moving from	Type	Fee	Source
Summer
15 June 1997	DF	(Ukraine) Dmytro Romanenko	20	(Ukraine) Slavutych	Transfer	Free	
15 June 1997	MF	(Ukraine) Volodymyr Holovaty	20	(Ukraine) Slavutych	Transfer	Free	
15 June 1997	MF	(Ukraine) Bohdan Husak	20	(Ukraine) Tysmenytsia	Transfer	Free	
15 June 1997	FW	(Ukraine) Yuriy Ovcharenko	20	(Ukraine) Ros Bila Tserkva	Transfer	Free	
15 June 1997	FW	(Ukraine) Orest Atamanchuk	20	(Ukraine) Khutrovyk Tysmenytsia	Transfer	Free	
Winter
15 January 1998	GK	(Ukraine) Ihor Krapyvkin	20	(Ukraine) Mykolaiv	Transfer	Free	
15 January 1998	DF	(Ukraine) Valeriy Shapovalov	20	(Ukraine) Kryvbas Kryvyi Rih	Transfer	Free	
15 January 1998	DF	(Ukraine) Dmytro Romanenko	20	(Ukraine) Slavutych	Transfer	Free	
15 January 1998	MF	(Ukraine) Igor Vysochansky	20	(Ukraine) Domostroitel Chernihiv	Transfer	Free	
15 January 1998	FW	(Kazakhstan) Vladimir Martynov	20	(Ukraine) Slavutych	Transfer	Free	

=== Out ===
Date	Pos.	Player	Age	Moving to	Type	Fee	Source
Summer
15 January 1998	GK	(Ukraine) Ihor Krapyvkin	20	(Ukraine) Mykolaiv	Transfer	Free	
15 June 1997	DF	(Ukraine) Yuriy Nadtochiy	20	(Belarus) Gomel	Transfer	Free	
15 June 1997	DF	(Ukraine) Volodymyr Kulyk	20	(Belarus) Gomel	Transfer	Free	
15 June 1997	MF	(Ukraine) Serhiy Zelinskyi	20	(Ukraine) Domostroitel Chernihiv	Transfer	Free	
15 June 1997	MF	(Ukraine) Andrey Krivenok	20	(Ukraine) Cheksyl Chernihiv	Transfer	Free	
15 June 1996	FW	(Ukraine) Serhiy Zgura	20	(Moldova) Zimbru Chișinău	Transfer	Free	
Winter
15 January 1998	DF	(Ukraine) Oleh Sobekh	20	(Ukraine) Slavutych	On Loan	Free	
15 January 1998	DF	(Ukraine) Valeriy Shapovalov	20	(Ukraine) Kryvbas Kryvyi Rih	Transfer	Free	
15 January 1998	MF	(Ukraine) Vadim Danilevskiy	20	(Ukraine) Slavutich-ChNPP	Transfer	Free	
15 June 1998	FW	(Ukraine) Volodymyr Avramenko	20	(Ukraine) Slavutych	Transfer	Free	
15 January 1998	FW	(Ukraine) Andriy Borysyuk	20	(Ukraine) Fortuna Sharhorod	Transfer	Free	
15 January 1998	FW	(Ukraine) Orest Atamanchuk	20	(Ukraine) Slavutych	Transfer	Free	
15 January 1998	FW	(Ukraine) Peter Pilipeyko	20	(Ukraine) Slavutych	Transfer	Free	

== Competitions ==
=== Overall ===
Competition	First match	Last match	Starting round	Final position	Record							
Competition	First match	Last match	Starting round	Final position	Pld	W	D	L	GF	GA	GD	Win %
Ukrainian First League	10 October 1996	10 June 1997	Matchday 1	25	42	14	12	16	45	53	−8	33.33
Ukrainian Cup	22 July 1997	1 November 1997	First preliminary round	Round of 32 (1/16)	8	6	0	2	13	12	+1	75.00
Total					50	20	12	18	58	65	−7	40.00

Last updated: 22 October 2026
Source: Competitions

=== Ukrainian First League ===
2 August 1997 1	Desna Chernihiv	1–1	FC Cherkasy	Chernihiv
19:00 EEST (UTC+03:00)		Report		Stadium: Chernihiv Stadium; Attendance: 4000

8 August 1997 2	Avanhard-Industria Rovenky	0–0	Desna Chernihiv	Rovenky
19:00 EEST (UTC+03:00)		Report		Stadium: Avanhard Stadium; Attendance: 3500

11 August 1997 3	Zorya Luhansk	1–1	Desna Chernihiv	Luhansk
19:00 EEST (UTC+03:00)		Report		Stadium: Avanhard Stadium; Attendance: 1500

16 August 1997 4	Desna Chernihiv	1–1	Polihraftekhnika Oleksandria	Chernihiv
19:00 EEST (UTC+03:00)		Report		Stadium: Chernihiv Stadium; Attendance: 4000

19 August 1997 5	Desna Chernihiv	1–0	Kremin Kremenchuk	Chernihiv
19:00 EEST (UTC+03:00)		Report		Stadium: Chernihiv Stadium; Attendance: 4300

25 August 1997 6	Polissya Zhytomyr	3–2	Desna Chernihiv	Zhytomyr
19:00 EEST (UTC+03:00)		Report		Stadium: Central Stadium; Attendance: 1000

28 August 1997 7	Nyva Vinnytsia	4–1	Desna Chernihiv	Vinnytsia
19:00 EEST (UTC+03:00)		Report		Stadium: Central Stadium; Attendance: 4000

2 September 1997 8	Dynamo-2 Kyiv	1–0	Desna Chernihiv	Kiev
19:00 EEST (UTC+03:00)		Report		Stadium: Dynamo Stadium; Attendance: 500

11 September 1997 9	Desna Chernihiv	3–2	SC Mykolaiv	Chernihiv
19:00 EEST (UTC+03:00)		Report		Stadium: Chernihiv Stadium; Attendance: 6000

14 September 1997 10	Desna Chernihiv	3–1	Metalurh Nikopol	Chernihiv
19:00 EEST (UTC+03:00)		Report		Stadium: Chernihiv Stadium; Attendance: 3000

20 September 1997 11	Bukovyna Chernivtsi	1–0	Desna Chernihiv	Chernivtsi
19:00 EEST (UTC+03:00)		Report		Stadium: Bukovyna Stadium; Attendance: 2000

23 September 1997 12	Volyn Lutsk	3–0	Desna Chernihiv	Lutsk
19:00 EEST (UTC+03:00)		Report		Stadium: Avanhard Stadium; Attendance: 1500

28 September 1997 13	Desna Chernihiv	1–0	Yavir Krasnopillia	Chernihiv
19:00 EEST (UTC+03:00)		Report		Stadium: Chernihiv Stadium; Attendance: 3000

1 October 1997 14	Desna Chernihiv	1–1	Naftovyk Okhtyrka	Chernihiv
19:00 EEST (UTC+03:00)		Report		Stadium: Chernihiv Stadium; Attendance: 2000

7 October 1997 15	Shakhtar Makiivka	2–2	Desna Chernihiv	Makiivka
19:00 EEST (UTC+03:00)		Report		Stadium: Avanhard Stadium; Attendance: 1100

10 October 1997 16	Stal Alchevsk	4–0	Desna Chernihiv	Alchevsk
19:00 EEST (UTC+03:00)		Report		Stadium: Stal Stadium (Alchevsk); Attendance: 6000

6 November 1997 17	Desna Chernihiv	1–1	Verkhovyna Uzhhorod	Chernihiv
19:00 EEST (UTC+03:00)		Report		Stadium: Chernihiv Stadium; Attendance: 800

6 November 1997 18	Desna Chernihiv	1–0	Lviv	Chernihiv
19:00 EEST (UTC+03:00)		Report		Stadium: Chernihiv Stadium; Attendance: 1500

14 November 1997 19	Khimik Severodonetsk	0–2	Desna Chernihiv	Sievierodonetsk
19:00 EEST (UTC+03:00)		Report		Stadium: Khimik Stadium; Attendance: 1500

17 November 1997 20	Metalist Kharkiv	2–1	Desna Chernihiv	Kharkiv
19:00 EEST (UTC+03:00)		Report		Stadium: Metalist Stadium; Attendance: 12000

21 November 1997 21	Desna Chernihiv	1–0	CSCA-2 Kyiv	Chernihiv
19:00 EEST (UTC+03:00)		Report		Stadium: Chernihiv Stadium; Attendance: 1000

27 November 1997 22	Desna Chernihiv	0–1	Metalist Kharkiv	Chernihiv
19:00 EEST (UTC+03:00)		Report		Stadium: Chernihiv Stadium; Attendance: 5000

30 March 1998 23	Desna Chernihiv	1–0	Khimik Severodonetsk	Chernihiv
19:00 EEST (UTC+03:00)		Report		Stadium: Chernihiv Stadium; Attendance: 4000

4 April 1998 24	Lviv	0–1	Desna Chernihiv	Lviv
19:00 EEST (UTC+03:00)		Report		Stadium: Yunost Stadium; Attendance: 1000

7 April 1998 25	Verkhovyna Uzhhorod	2–2	Desna Chernihiv	Uzhhorod
19:00 EEST (UTC+03:00)		Report		Stadium: Avanhard Stadium; Attendance: 1000

13 April 1998 26	Desna Chernihiv	1–0	FC Stal Alchevsk	Chernihiv
19:00 EEST (UTC+03:00)		Report		Stadium: Chernihiv Stadium; Attendance: 3000

16 April 1998 27	Desna Chernihiv	1–1	Shakhtar Makiivka	Chernihiv
19:00 EEST (UTC+03:00)		Report		Stadium: Chernihiv Stadium; Attendance: 3000

22 April 1998 28	Naftovyk Okhtyrka	4–0	Desna Chernihiv	Okhtyrka
19:00 EEST (UTC+03:00)		Report		Stadium: Naftovyk Stadium; Attendance: 3000

26 April 1998 29	FC Yavir Krasnopillia	2–1	Desna Chernihiv	Krasnopillia
19:00 EEST (UTC+03:00)		Report		Stadium: Stadium Kolos; Attendance: 1100

30 April 1998 30	Desna Chernihiv	1–0	Volyn Lutsk	Chernihiv
19:00 EEST (UTC+03:00)		Report		Stadium: Chernihiv Stadium; Attendance: 5000

3 May 1998 31	Desna Chernihiv	1–0	Bukovyna Chernivtsi	Chernihiv
19:00 EEST (UTC+03:00)		Report		Stadium: Chernihiv Stadium; Attendance: 2500

8 May 2018 32	Metalurh Nikopol	1–0	Desna Chernihiv	Nikopol
19:00 EEST (UTC+03:00)		Report		Stadium: Trubnik Stadium; Attendance: 2000

11 May 2018 33	SC Mykolaiv	3–1	Desna Chernihiv	Mykolaiv
19:00 EEST (UTC+03:00)		Report		Stadium: Tsentralnyi Stadion; Attendance: 20000

19 May 1998 34	Desna Chernihiv	0–1	Dynamo-2 Kyiv	Chernihiv
19:00 EEST (UTC+03:00)		Report		Stadium: Chernihiv Stadium; Attendance: 8000

24 May 1998 35	Desna Chernihiv	1–1	Nyva Vinnytsia	Chernihiv
19:00 EEST (UTC+03:00)		Report		Stadium: Chernihiv Stadium; Attendance: 4500

27 May 1998 36	Desna Chernihiv	1–2	Polissya Zhytomyr	Chernihiv
19:00 EEST (UTC+03:00)		Report		Stadium: Chernihiv Stadium; Attendance: 4500

8 June 1998 37	Kremin Kremenchuk	2–1	Desna Chernihiv	Kremenchuk
19:00 EEST (UTC+03:00)		Report		Stadium: Polytechnic Stadium; Attendance: 3000

11 June 1998 38	Polihraftekhnika Oleksandria	2–2	Desna Chernihiv	Oleksandria
19:00 EEST (UTC+03:00)		Report		Stadium: Nika Stadium; Attendance: 2000

16 June 1998 39	Desna Chernihiv	2–0	Zorya Luhansk	Chernihiv
19:00 EEST (UTC+03:00)		Report		Stadium: Chernihiv Stadium; Attendance: 1500

19 June 1998 40	Desna Chernihiv	3–0	FC Avanhard-Industria Rovenky	Chernihiv
19:00 EEST (UTC+03:00)		Report		Stadium: Chernihiv Stadium; Attendance: 2000

23 June 1998 41	FC Cherkasy	2–2	Desna Chernihiv	Cherkasy
19:00 EEST (UTC+03:00)		Report		Stadium: Central Stadium; Attendance: 200

26 June 1998 42	CSCA-2 Kyiv	1–0	Desna Chernihiv	Kiev
19:00 EEST (UTC+03:00)		Report		Stadium: CSK ZSU Stadium; Attendance: 100

=== Ukrainian Cup ===
22 July 1997 Second qualification round (1st stage)	Desna Chernihiv	3–0	FC Tsementnyk Mykolaiv	Chernihiv
17:00 EEST (UTC+03:00)		Report		Stadium: Chernihiv Stadium; Attendance: 2000

26 July 1997 Second qualification round (2nd stage)	Tsementnyk Mykolaiv	4–1 (4–4 agg.)	Desna Chernihiv	Mykolaiv
17:00 EEST (UTC+03:00)		Report		Attendance: 2000

15 October 1997 Third qualification round (1st stage)	Desna Chernihiv	1–0	Dynamo-2 Kyiv	Chernihiv
17:00 EEST (UTC+03:00)		Report		Stadium: Chernihiv Stadium; Attendance: 2000

20 October 1997 Third qualification round(2nd stage)	Dynamo-2 Kyiv	1–2 (1–3 agg.)	Desna Chernihiv	Kiev
17:00 EEST (UTC+03:00)		Report		Stadium: Stadium Temp; Attendance: 300

25 October 1997 Round of 32 (1st stage)	Metalurh Mariupol	5–3	Desna Chernihiv	Mariupol
17:00 EEST (UTC+03:00)		Report		Stadium: Stadium Azovstal; Attendance: 6000

11 November 1997 Round of 32 (2nd stage)	Desna Chernihiv	3–2 (7–6 agg.)	Metalurh Mariupol	Chernihiv
17:00 EEST (UTC+03:00)		Report		Stadium: Chernihiv Stadium; Attendance: 3000

== Statistics ==
=== Appearances and goals ===
No.	Pos	Nat	Player	Total		Ukrainian First League		Ukrainian Cup		Play-offs	
No.	Pos	Nat	Player	Apps	Goals	Apps	Goals	Apps	Goals	Apps	Goals
Goalkeepers
	GK	(Ukraine) UKR	Ihor Krapyvkin	11	0	11	0	0	0	0	0
	GK	(Ukraine) UKR	Yuriy Ovcharov	34	0	29	0	5	0	0	0
	GK	(Ukraine) UKR	Oleksandr Mitko	4	0	4	0	0	0	0	0
Defenders
	DF	(Ukraine) UKR	Oleh Sobekh	20	0	19	0	1	0	0	0
	DF	(Ukraine) UKR	Serhiy Sapronov	24	0	21	0	3	0	0	0
	DF	(Georgia (country)) GEO	Kakhaberi Sartania	29	2	26	1	3	1	0	0
	DF	(Ukraine) UKR	Leonid Haidarzhy	26	1	24	1	2	0	0	0
	DF	(Ukraine) UKR	Yaroslav Zaiats	37	1	32	1	5	0	0	0
	DF	(Ukraine) UKR	Viktor Rudyi	24	0	18	0	6	0	0	0
	DF	(Ukraine) UKR	Bohdan Husak	40	2	34	2	6	0	0	0
	DF	(Ukraine) UKR	Volodymyr Kolomiets	35	2	30	1	5	1	0	0
	DF	(Ukraine) UKR	Volodymyr Kulyk	2	0	1	0	1	0	0	0
	DF	(Ukraine) UKR	Dmytro Romanenko	20	5	16	2	4	3	0	0
Midfielders
	MF	(Ukraine) UKR	Ruslan Hilazyev	36	8	36	3	0	5	0	0
	MF	(Ukraine) UKR	Oleksandr Savenchuk	48	1	42	1	6	0	0	0
	MF	(Ukraine) UKR	Igor Vysochansky	13	0	13	0	0	0	0	0
	MF	(Ukraine) UKR	Ihor Bobovych	21	1	17	1	4	0	0	0
	MF	(Ukraine) UKR	Volodymyr Holovaty	47	5	41	4	6	1	0	0
	MF	(Ukraine) UKR	Vladimir Drobot	13	0	12	0	1	0	0	0
	MF	(Ukraine) UKR	Oleksandr Babor	1	0	0	0	1	0	0	0
Forwards
	FW	(Kazakhstan) KAZ	Vladimir Martynov	1	0	1	0	0	0	0	0
	FW	(Ukraine) UKR	Andriy Borysyuk	3	0	3	0	0	0	0	0
	FW	(Ukraine) UKR	Yuriy Ovcharenko	41	12	36	9	5	3	0	0
Players transferred out during the season
	DF	(Ukraine) UKR	Oleh Sobekh	20	0	19	0	1	0	0	0
	DF	(Ukraine) UKR	Vadim Danilevskiy	21	1	21	1	0	0	0	0
	DF	(Ukraine) UKR	Valeriy Shapovalov	15	1	15	1	0	0	0	0
	MF	(Ukraine) UKR	Volodymyr Avramenko	27	3	24	2	3	1	0	0
	FW	(Ukraine) UKR	Orest Atamanchuk	45	12	41	10	4	2	0	0
	FW	(Ukraine) UKR	Peter Pilipeyko	28	1	25	1	3	0	0	0

Source: Competitions

Last updated: 22 October 2026

=== Goalscorers ===
Rank	No.	Pos	Nat	Name	Ukrainian First League	Ukrainian Cup	Play-offs	Total
1		FW	(Ukraine)	Yuriy Ovcharenko	9	4	0	13
2		FW	(Ukraine)	Orest Atamanchuk	10	0	0	10
3		MF	(Ukraine)	Volodymyr Holovaty	4	1	0	5
4		DF	(Ukraine)	Dmytro Romanenko	2	3	0	5
5		MF	(Ukraine)	Ruslan Hilazyev	3	0	0	3
6		MF	(Ukraine)	Volodymyr Avramenko	2	1	0	3
7		DF	(Ukraine)	Bohdan Husak	2	0	0	2
8		DF	(Georgia (country))	Kakhaberi Sartania	1	1	0	2
9		FW	(Ukraine)	Orest Atamanchuk	0	2	0	2
10		FW	(Ukraine)	Peter Pilipeyko	1	0	0	1
11		DF	(Ukraine)	Valeriy Shapovalov	1	0	0	1
12		DF	(Ukraine)	Leonid Haidarzhy	1	0	0	1
13		DF	(Ukraine)	Yaroslav Zaiats	1	0	0	1
14		MF	(Ukraine)	Oleksandr Savenchuk	1	0	0	1
15		MF	(Ukraine)	Ihor Bobovych	1	0	0	1
16		DF	(Ukraine)	Vadim Danilevskiy	1	0	0	1
17		FW	(Ukraine)	Volodymyr Kolomiets	0	1	0	1
				Total	34	13	0	47

Last updated: 22 October 2026

=== Clean sheets ===
Rank	No.	Pos	Nat	Name	Ukrainian First League	Ukrainian Cup	Play-offs	Total
1		GK	(Ukraine)	Yuriy Ovcharov	8	1	0	9
2		GK	(Ukraine)	Ihor Krapyvkin	3	0	0	3
1		GK	(Ukraine)	Oleksandr Mitko	1	0	0	1
				Total	12	1	0	13

Last updated: 22 October 2026
