= 2000–01 FC Desna Chernihiv season =

FC Desna Chernihiv
2000–01 season
- President: Ivan Chaus
- Manager: Vadym Lazorenko
- Stadium: Chernihiv Stadium
- Ukrainian Second League: 2nd
- Ukrainian Cup: 1/16 finals Second League Cup
- Top goalscorer: League: Yuriy Yakovenko (16); All: Yuriy Yakovenko (16)
Home colours	Away colours

For the 2000–01 season, FC Desna Chernihiv competed in the Ukrainian Second League.

== Players ==
=== Squad information ===
As of 19 July 2020

Squad no.	Name	Nationality	Position	Date of birth (age)
Goalkeepers
35	Maksym Tatarenko ^{List B}	(Ukraine)	GK	7 May 1999 (aged 21)
	Artem Padun	(Ukraine)	GK	2 August 1983 (aged 17)
72	Ihor Lytovka	(Ukraine)	GK	5 June 1988 (aged 32)
Defenders
4	Joonas Tamm	(Estonia)	DF	2 February 1992 (aged 28)
5	Vitaliy Yermakov	(Ukraine)	DF	7 June 1992 (aged 28)
17	Andriy Hitchenko	(Ukraine)	DF	2 October 1984 (aged 35)
22	Andriy Mostovyi	(Ukraine)	DF	24 January 1988 (aged 32)
26	Yukhym Konoplya ^{List B} (on loan from Shakhtar Donetsk)	(Ukraine)	DF	26 August 1999 (aged 20)
32	Maksym Imerekov	(Ukraine)	DF	23 January 1991 (aged 29)
43	Artur Zapadnya	(Ukraine)	DF	4 June 1990 (aged 30)
45	Denys Favorov (Captain)	(Ukraine)	DF	1 April 1991 (aged 29)
Midfielders
7	Vladyslav Ohirya	(Ukraine)	MF	3 April 1990 (aged 30)
8	Andriy Dombrovskyi	(Ukraine)	MF	12 August 1995 (aged 24)
9	Levan Arveladze	(Ukraine) (Georgia (country))	MF	6 April 1993 (aged 27)
11	Vladyslav Kalitvintsev	(Ukraine)	MF	4 January 1993 (aged 27)
12	Yehor Kartushov	(Ukraine)	MF	5 January 1991 (aged 29)
14	Andriy Yakymiv ^{List B}	(Ukraine)	MF	15 June 1997 (aged 23)
16	Yevheniy Belych ^{List B}	(Ukraine)	MF	9 January 2001 (aged 19)
20	Andriy Totovytskyi	(Ukraine)	MF	20 January 1993 (aged 27)
25	Oleksiy Hutsulyak	(Ukraine)	MF	25 December 1997 (aged 22)
27	Serhiy Starenkyi	(Ukraine)	MF	20 September 1984 (aged 35)
77	Orest Kuzyk	(Ukraine)	MF	17 May 1995 (aged 25)
Forwards
10	Oleksandr Filippov	(Ukraine)	FW	23 October 1992 (aged 27)
13	Dmytro Khlyobas	(Ukraine)	FW	9 May 1994 (aged 26)
28	Pylyp Budkivskyi	(Ukraine)	FW	10 March 1992 (aged 28)

== Transfers ==
=== In ===
Date	Pos.	Player	Age	Moving from	Type	Fee	Source
Summer
15 June 2000	GK	(Ukraine) Artem Padun	20	(Ukraine) SDYuShOR Desna	Transfer	Free	
15 June 2000	DF	(Ukraine) Oleh Sobekh	20	(Ukraine) Volyn Lutsk	Transfer	Free	
15 June 2000	DF	(Ukraine) Volodymyr Kulyk	20	(Ukraine) Naftovyk Okhtyrka	Transfer	Free	
15 June 2000	FW	(Ukraine) Volodymyr Vanin	20	(Kazakhstan) Taraz	Transfer	Free	
Winter
15 June 2001	DF	(Ukraine) Oleksandr Malevanov	20	(Ukraine) Monolith Konstantinovka	Transfer	Free	

=== Out ===
Date	Pos.	Player	Age	Moving to	Type	Fee	Source
Summer
15 June 2000	DF	(Ukraine) Serhiy Sapronov	20	Unattached	Transfer	Free	
15 June 2000	DF	(Ukraine) Igor Zhornyak	20	(Ukraine) FC Nizhyn	Transfer	Free	
15 June 2000	DF	(Ukraine) Valeriy Zhogolko	20	(Ukraine) Elektron Romny	Transfer	Free	
15 June 2000	FW	(Georgia (country)) Kakhaberi Sartania	20	(Ukraine) FC Nizhyn	Transfer	Free	
Winter
15 January 2001	GK	(Ukraine) Viktor Litvin	20	(Ukraine) FC Nizhyn	Loan Return	Free	
15 January 2001	DF	(Ukraine) Viktor Zapara	20	(Ukraine) Niva-Borisfen Mironovka	Transfer	Free	
15 January 2001	DF	(Ukraine) Oleh Sobekh	20	(Ukraine) Volyn Lutsk	Transfer	Free	
15 January 2001	FW	(Ukraine) Yuriy Bondarenko	20	(Ukraine) FC Nizhyn	Transfer	Free	

== Statistics ==
=== Appearances and goals ===
No.	Pos	Nat	Player	Total		Premier League		Cup	
No.	Pos	Nat	Player	Apps	Goals	Apps	Goals	Apps	Goals
Goalkeepers
	GK	(Ukraine) UKR	Yuriy Melashenko	30	0	30	0	0	0
	GK	(Ukraine) UKR	Artem Padun	1	0	1	0	0	0
	GK	(Ukraine) UKR	Viktor Lytvyn	3	0	3	0	0	0
Defenders
	DF	(Ukraine) UKR	Volodymyr Kulyk	14	1	14	1	0	0
	DF	(Ukraine) UKR	Oleh Sobekh	13	2	13	2	0	0
	DF	(Ukraine) UKR	Oleksandr Lepekho	27	0	27	0	0	0
	DF	(Ukraine) UKR	Viktor Zapara	14	1	14	1	0	0
	DF	(Ukraine) UKR	Maksym Markelov	0	0	0	0	0	0
	DF	(Ukraine) UKR	Artem Perevozchikov	7	0	7	0	0	0
	DF	(Ukraine) UKR	Konstantin Poznyak	27	0	27	0	0	0
	DF	(Ukraine) UKR	Andrey Polyanitsa	21	1	21	1	0	0
	DF	(Ukraine) UKR	Ruslan Popov	9	0	9	0	0	0
	DF	(Ukraine) UKR	Oleksandr Selivanov	17	0	17	0	0	0
	DF	(Ukraine) UKR	Yevgeniy Tsepkalo	15	0	15	0	0	0
Midfielders
	MF	(Ukraine) UKR	Volodymyr Avramenko	27	12	27	12	0	0
	MF	(Ukraine) UKR	Vadym Postovoy	19	4	19	4	0	0
	MF	(Ukraine) UKR	Yuriy Bondarenko	15	1	15	1	0	0
	MF	(Ukraine) UKR	Ihor Bobovych	15	3	15	3	0	0
	MF	(Ukraine) UKR	Vyacheslav Kovalenko	12	0	12	0	0	0
	MF	(Ukraine) UKR	Ihor Lyashenko	14	1	14	1	0	0
	MF	(Ukraine) UKR	Sergey Sinelnik	30	12	30	12	0	0
	MF	(Ukraine) UKR	Boris Shevelyuk	14	1	14	1	0	0
Forwards
	FW	(Ukraine) UKR	Oleksandr Kozhemyachenko	27	10	27	10	0	0
	FW	(Ukraine) UKR	Volodymyr Vanin	8	1	8	1	0	0
	FW	(Ukraine) UKR	Yuriy Yakovenko	29	16	29	16	0	0
	FW	(Ukraine) UKR	Sergey Alayev	3	0	3	0	0	0

Source: Competitions

Last updated: 31 May 2019

=== Goalscorers ===
Rank	No.	Pos	Nat	Name	Premier League	Cup	Europa League	Total
1		FW	(Ukraine)	Yuriy Yakovenko	16	0	0	16
2		MF	(Ukraine)	Volodymyr Avramenko	12	0	0	12
3		FW	(Ukraine)	Oleksandr Kozhemyachenko	10	0	0	10
4		MF	(Ukraine)	Vadym Postovoy	4	0	0	4
5		MF	(Ukraine)	Ihor Bobovych	3	0	0	3
7		MF	(Ukraine)	Ihor Lyashenko	1	0	0	1
7		MF	(Ukraine)	Yuriy Bondarenko	1	0	0	1
7		FW	(Ukraine)	Volodymyr Vanin	1	0	0	1
7		DF	(Ukraine)	Viktor Zapara	1	0	0	1
7		DF	(Ukraine)	Andrey Polyanitsa	1	0	0	1
				Total	50	0	0	50

Last updated: 31 May 2019
