= Serhiy Turyanskyi =

Ukrainian footballer (born 1962)

Personal information
- Full name: Serhiy Myronovych Turyanskyi
- Date of birth: 25 May 1962 (age 64)
- Place of birth: Kolomyia, Ukrainian SSR
- Height: 1.85 m (6 ft 1 in)
- Position: Forward

Team information
- Current team: FC Karpaty Yaremche (manager)

Youth career
- Kolomea sport school

Senior career*
Years	Team	Apps	(Gls)
1982	Avtomobilist Tiraspol	28	(8)
1983	Nistru Chişinău	19	(2)
1984	SKA Karpaty Lviv	5	(0)
1986–1988	Prykarpattya Ivano-Frankivsk	51	(24)
1988	Tavriya Simferopol	25	(5)
1988	Bystrytsia Nadvirna	?	(?)
1989	Prykarpattia	43	(11)
1990	Nyva Vinnytsia	21	(4)
1990–1992	Nyíregyháza Spartacus	?	(?)
1992–93	Khutrovyk Tysmenytsia	?	(?)
1993–1996	Prykarpattia	71	(30)
1996	Tysmenytsia	7	(7)
1997–98	Nyva Ternopil	29	(9)

International career
1994	Ukraine	1	(0)

Managerial career
- 2001: Prykarpattya Ivano-Frankivsk
- 2004–2008: Teplovyk Ivano-Frankivsk
- 2010–: FC Karpaty Yaremche
- * Club domestic league appearances and goals

Serhiy Turyanskyi (Ukrainian: Сергій Миронович Турянський; born 25 May 1962) is a Ukrainian professional football coach and former player. He also played in the neighboring countries of Poland and Hungary.

== Playing career ==
His primary football development obtained in the Kolomyia sport school. He made his professional debut in the Soviet Second League B in the beginning of the 1980s for couple of Moldavian clubs. Around mid-80s he played for the Lviv army-men, subsequently transferring to the fourth-runner of the Ivano-Frankivsk football, Prykarpattia. In 1988 Turyanskyi managed to play for Tavria as well as the amateur club from Nadvirna (Ivano-Frankivsk Oblast), eventually ending up back at Prykarpattia. Before playing abroad he also played in Vinnytsia. In 1993 Turyanskyi returned to native Prykarpattia for which played 70+ games and earning the honors of the Ukrainian First League. For short time he played in Tysmenytsia, a city next to Ivano-Frankivsk and later for Nyva Ternopil where he finished his career.

Turyanskyi played a single game for the national team on 15 March 1994. In the game against Israel he substituted Serhiy Konovalov on the 68th minute and later received a yellow card. Ukraine has lost the game at home 0:1.
