= Orest Atamanchuk =

Soviet footballer and Ukrainian coach

Personal information
- Date of birth: 5 September 1971 (age 55)
- Place of birth: Ukrainian SSR, USSR
- Height: 1.84 m (6 ft 0 in)
- Position: Forward

Senior career*
Years	Team	Apps	(Gls)
1995–1997	Khutrovyk Tysmenytsia	75	(28)
1997–1998	Desna Chernihiv	41	(10)
1998	Slavutych-ChAES	1	(0)
1998–1999	Kryvbas Kryvyi Rih	12	(3)
1998–1999	Kryvbas-2 Kryvyi Rih	11	(3)
1999–2000	Prykarpattia Ivano-Frankivsk	14	(3)
1999–2000	→ Prykarpattia-2 Ivano-Frankivsk	4	(3)
2001–2002	Kryvbas Kryvyi Rih	12	(0)
2003–2005	Spartak Ivano-Frankivsk	19	(3)
2004–2005	Krymteplytsia Molodizhne	10	(0)
2005–2007	Kryvbas Kryvyi Rih	48	(11)
- * Club domestic league appearances and goals as of 13 January 2022

Orest Atamanchuk (Ukrainian: Атаманчук Орест Богданович) is a Ukrainian retired footballer.

== Career ==
Orest Atamanchuk, started his career in 1995 at Khutrovyk Tysmenytsia. In summer 1997 he moved to Desna Chernihiv, the main club in the city of Chernihiv, then he moved to Slavutych-ChAES. In 1998 he moved to Kryvbas Kryvyi Rih, Kryvbas-2 Kryvyi Rih and in 1999 he played for Prykarpattia Ivano-Frankivsk and Prykarpattia-2 Ivano-Frankivsk. In 2001 he played again for Kryvbas Kryvyi Rih and in 2003 he played 19 matches scoring 3 goals with Spartak Ivano-Frankivsk. I 2004 he played 10 matches with Krymteplytsia Molodizhne, the club in Crimea and 48 matches and scoring 11 goals with Kryvbas Kryvyi Rih.

== Honours ==
Krymteplytsia Molodizhne

- Ukrainian Second League: 2004–05
