= Igor Vysochansky =

Soviet footballer and Ukrainian coach

Personal information
- Full name: Высочанский Игорь Брониславович
- Date of birth: 3 May 1968 (age 58)
- Place of birth: Ukrainian SSR, USSR
- Height: 1.84 m (6 ft 0 in)
- Position: Midfielder

Senior career*
Years	Team	Apps	(Gls)
1991–1993	Halychyna Drohobych	51	(10)
1993–1994	Volyn Lutsk	9	(0)
1993–1994	Zirka Kropyvnytskyi	11	(0)
1994–1996	Lviv	58	(15)
1996–1997	Systema-Boreks	12	(2)
1997–1998	Desna Chernihiv	13	(0)
1999–2000	Reformatsiya Abakan	18	(1)
2000–2001	Hazovyk Komarno	12	(0)
2001–2003	Dynamo Kirov	74	(8)
- * Club domestic league appearances and goals as of 13 January 2022

Igor Vysochansky (Ukrainian: Высочанский Игорь Брониславович) is a retired Ukrainian footballer who played as a midfielder.

== Career ==
Igor Vysochansky started his career in 1992 for two season with Halychyna Drohobych then he moved to Volyn Lutsk. In 1993 he played 11 matches with Zirka Kropyvnytskyi and 58 matches with Lviv and 12 Systema-Boreks. In 1997 he moved to Desna Chernihiv, the main club of Chernihiv where he played 18 matches and scored 1 goal. In 199 he played 18 matches with Reformatsiya Abakan and 12 matches with Hazovyk Komarno, then he returned to Russia for two seasons where he played 74 matches and scored 8 goals with Dynamo Kirov.
