= Oleksandr Aleksiyenko =

Ukrainian footballer (1981–2014)

Personal information
- Full name: Oleksandr Anatoliyovych Aleksiyenko
- Date of birth: 6 October 1981
- Place of birth: Chernihiv, Ukrainian SSR, USSR
- Date of death: 23 April 2014 (aged 32)
- Place of death: Chernihiv, Chernihiv Oblast, Ukraine
- Height: 1.84 m (6 ft 0 in)
- Position: Defender

Youth career
- 1999: Desna Chernihiv

Senior career*
Years	Team	Apps	(Gls)
1999–2000	Desna Chernihiv	7	(0)
2001–2004	Energiya Chernihiv	26	(3)
2005–2006	Enerhiya Yuzhnoukrainsk	28	(0)
2006–2008	Spartakus Szarowola	0	(0)
2008–2011	Sevastopol	79	(13)
2011–2012	Buran-Resource Donetsk	8	(2)
2012	Gvardeyets Gvardeyskoye	12	(0)
2012–2013	Buran-Resource Donetsk	16	(1)
- * Club domestic league appearances and goals as of 31 January 2022

Oleksandr Anatoliyovych Aleksiyenko (Ukrainian: Олександр Анатолійович Алексієнко; 6 October 1981 – 23 April 2014) was a retired Ukrainian footballer who played as a defender.

== Career ==
Oleksandr Aleksiyenko was a product of Desna Chernihiv in 1999. Then he moved to the main team and he managed to play 7 matches in the season 1999–2000 in Ukrainian Second League. In 2001 he moved to Energiya Chernihiv where he stayed until 2004 where he managed to play 26 matches and scored 3 goals. In 2005 he moved to Enerhiya Yuzhnoukrainsk in Ukrainian Second League where he managed 28 matches and he managed to get 12 place in the season 2005–06. In 2008 he moved to Sevastopol where he managed to play 79 matches and scored 13 goals where he stayed until 2011. He also won the Ukrainian First League in the season 2009–10. In 2011 he moved to Buran-Resource Donetsk where he played 8 matches and scored 2 goals. In summer 2012 he moved to Gvardeyets Gvardeyskoye where he played 12 matches and then he moved back to Buran-Resource Donetsk where he played 16 matches and scored 1 goal.

== Honours ==
Sevastopol

- Ukrainian First League: 2009–10
