= Oleksandr Tsybenko =

Ukrainian footballer

Personal information
- Date of birth: 29 January 1980 (age 46)
- Place of birth: Chernihiv, Ukrainian SSR, USSR
- Height: 1.84 m (6 ft 0 in)
- Position: Midfielder

Youth career
- Yunist Chernihiv

Senior career*
Years	Team	Apps	(Gls)
1994–1995	Dynamo-3 Kyiv	1	(0)
1995–1996	Ros Bila Tserkva	13	(0)
1999–2000	Desna Chernihiv	12	(0)
2001–2002	Yevropa Pryluky	34	(16)
2003	FC Nizhyn	4	(1)
- * Club domestic league appearances and goals as of 30 January 2022

Oleksandr Tsybenko (Ukrainian: Олександр Володимирович Цибенко) is a retired Ukrainian professional footballer who played as a midfielder.

== Career ==
Oleksandr Tsybenko started his career with Yunist Chernihiv, the young team in the city of Chernihiv. In 1993, he moved to Dynamo-3 Kyiv in the Ukrainian Football Amateur League, where he played 1 match in the 1993–94 season. In 1995, he moved to Ros Bila Tserkva, playing 13 matches and finishing 13th in the 1995–96 Ukrainian Second League season. In 1999, he moved to Desna Chernihiv, the main club in Chernihiv, competing in the Ukrainian Second League. There, he played 12 matches in 1999–2000 season, where he finished in 9th place with the club. In 2001, he moved to Yevropa Pryluky where he played until 2002, playing 34 matches and scoring 16 goals. In 2003, he moved to FC Nizhyn, playing 4 matches, scoring 1 goal, and winning the Chernihiv Oblast Football Cup.

== Honours ==
Nizhyn

- Chernihiv Oblast Football Cup: 2003
