= Andriy Borysyuk =

Soviet footballer and Ukrainian coach

Personal information
- Full name: Борисюк Андрей Витальевич
- Date of birth: 29 July 1975 (age 51)
- Place of birth: Ukrainian SSR, USSR
- Height: 1.84 m (6 ft 0 in)
- Position: Forward

Senior career*
Years	Team	Apps	(Gls)
1992–1994	Nyva Vinnytsia	11	(2)
1993–1994	Polissya Zhytomyr	1	(0)
1994–1995	Uzhhorod	4	(0)
1994–1996	Nyva Vinnytsia	27	(0)
1996–1998	Desna Chernihiv	12	(0)
1998–1999	Fortuna Sharhorod	10	(1)
- * Club domestic league appearances and goals as of 15 January 2022

Andriy Borysyuk (Ukrainian: Борисюк Андрей Витальевич) is a retired Ukrainian footballer who played as a forward.

== Career ==
Andriy Borysyuk started his career in 1992 at the Nyva Vinnytsia where he played 11 matches and scored 2 goals. Here he won the Ukrainian First League in the season 1992–93. In 1994 he played 4 matches with Nyva Vinnytsia and 27 matches with Nyva Vinnytsia. Here he got into the final of Ukrainian Cup in the season 1995–96. In summer 1996 he moved to Desna Chernihiv, the main club of the city of Chernihiv, where he won the Ukrainian Second League in the season 1996–97. In 1998 he moved to Fortuna Sharhorod.

== Honours ==
Desna Chernihiv

- Ukrainian Second League: 1996–97

Nyva Vinnytsia

- Ukrainian First League: 1992–93
- Ukrainian Cup: Runner-Up 1995–96
