= Bohdan Husak =

Ukrainian footballer

Bogdan Husak
Personal information
- Full name: Гусак Богдан Ярославович
- Date of birth: 4 May 1972 (age 54)
- Place of birth: Ukrainian SSR, USSR
- Height: 1.84 m (6 ft 0 in)
- Position: Defender

Senior career*
Years	Team	Apps	(Gls)
1989–1992	Halychyna Drohobych	3	(0)
1992–1993	Spartak Ivano-Frankivsk	3	(1)
1993–1994	Krystal Chortkiv	37	(1)
1994–1995	Spartak Ivano-Frankivsk	8	(0)
1994–1995	Krystal Chortkiv	20	(0)
1995–1996	Spartak Ivano-Frankivsk	7	(0)
1995–1996	Khutrovyk Tysmenytsia	29	(0)
1996–1997	FK Tysmenytsya	28	(5)
1997–1998	Desna Chernihiv	34	(2)
1998–1999	Kremin Kremenchuk	16	(3)
1998–1999	Desna Chernihiv	18	(0)
1999–2000	Kremin Kremenchuk	14	(1)
2000–2002	Techno-Centr Rohatyn	59	(6)
- * Club domestic league appearances and goals as of 13 January 2022

Bohdan Husak (Ukrainian: Гусак Богдан Ярославович) is a Ukrainian retired footballer.

== Career ==
A pupil of Ivano-Frankivsk CYSS. He began his football career in the club "Galychyna" (Drohobych), which played in the Second League of the USSR. He played 3 matches for the Drohobych team in the USSR championship.

In 1992 he moved to Spartak Ivano-Frankivsk. He made his debut for the Spartak Ivano-Frankivsk club on October 23, 1992, in a victorious (3: 1) home match of the 16th round of the First League against Ochakiv "Artania". Bogdan came on in the 79th minute, replacing Valery Lakhmai. He scored his debut goal for Spartak Ivano-Frankivsk on October 21, 1992, in the 64th minute of a draw (2: 2) away match of the 18th round of the First League against Crystal (Chortkiv). Gusak came on the field in the starting lineup, and in the 88th minute he was replaced by Oleg Humeniuk. In the first part of the 1992–93 season he played 3 matches in the Prykarpattia T-shirt and scored 1 goal.

In 1993 he accepted the invitation of Krystal Chortkiv. He made his debut for the new team on August 1, 1993, in the lost (1: 3) away match of the 1/64 finals of the Cup of Ukraine against Khmelnytsky "Advis". Bogdan went on the field in the starting lineup and played the whole match, and in the 17th minute received a yellow card. He made his debut for Krystal in the First League on August 15, 1993, in a victorious (2: 1) home match of the 1st round against Chernihiv's Desna. Gusak came on the field in the starting lineup and played the whole match. The only goal for the Chortkiv team was scored on May 30, 1994, in the 75th minute of the 33rd round of the First League against Spartak Ivano-Frankivsk. Gusak came out on top in the starting lineup and played the entire match. He played 57 matches (1 goal) for Crystal in the First League and played 3 more matches in the Ukrainian Cup.
