= Eldar Allakhverdiyev =

Soviet footballer and Ukrainian coach

Personal information
- Full name: Eldar Hafarovych Allakhverdiyev
- Date of birth: 28 June 1978 (age 48)
- Place of birth: Konotop, Ukrainian SSR, USSR
- Height: 1.84 m (6 ft 0 in)
- Position: Forward

Senior career*
Years	Team	Apps	(Gls)
1997–1999	Borysfen Boryspil	35	(3)
1998–1999	Mykolaiv	3	(0)
1999–2000	Borysfen Boryspil	8	(1)
1999–2000	Ros Bila Tserkva	13	(1)
2000–2001	Borysfen Boryspil	1	(0)
2000–2001	Ros Bila Tserkva	21	(0)
2001–2003	Desna Chernihiv	51	(7)
2002–2003	Sokil Zolochiv	3	(0)
- * Club domestic league appearances and goals as of 30 November 2021

Eldar Hafarovych Allakhverdiyev (Ukrainian: Ельдар Гафарович Аллахвердієв) is a retired Soviet and Ukrainian football player.

== Career ==
Eldar Allakhverdiyev, started his career in 1997 at Borysfen Boryspil in Kyiv until 1999, where he played 35 games and scoring 3 goals. In 1998 he played also 3 matches with Mykolaiv. He made his debut on 3 April 1999 during the match Metallurg (Mariupol) - SC Nikolaev, 3: 0. Then he played in the Ukrainian Second League clubs Ros Bila Tserkva and in 2001 he moved to Desna Chernihiv, the main club of Chernihiv. Since 2004 he has played in amateur and futsal teams. He spent some time in the Polish championship team.

== Honours ==
Borysfen Boryspil

- Ukrainian Second League: 1999–2000
