= Volodymyr Holovaty =

Soviet footballer and Ukrainian coach

Personal information
- Full name: Головатый Владимир Мирославович
- Date of birth: 2 November 1968 (age 57)
- Place of birth: Ukraine SSR, USSR
- Height: 1.84 m (6 ft 1/2 in)
- Position: Midfielder

Senior career*
Years	Team	Apps	(Gls)
1985–1995	Spartak Ivano-Frankivsk	130	(9)
1995–1998	Kalush	65	(12)
1997–1998	Desna Chernihiv	41	(4)
1997–1998	Slavutych	1	(0)
1998–1999	Kremin Kremenchuk	18	(2)
1998–1999	Desna Chernihiv	16	(1)
1999–2000	Kremin Kremenchuk	22	(3)
2000–2001	Enerhetyk Burshtyn	14	(2)
2000–2001	Kalush	14	(4)
2001–2002	Enerhetyk Burshtyn	30	(3)
2002–2003	Naftovyk Dolyna	13	(2)
- * Club domestic league appearances and goals as of 29 November 2021

Volodymyr Holovaty (Ukrainian: Головатый Владимир Мирославович) is a retired Soviet and Ukrainian football player.

== Career ==
Volodymyr Holovaty, started his career in 1985 at Spartak Ivano-Frankivsk until 1995, where he played 130 games. In 1995 he moved to Kalush. After a short break in his career, he returned to the team in 1989, and then in 1992, after the collapse of the USSR. In the first league of Ukraine, Golovaty spent two seasons and at the end of the 1993/94 season entered the elite division with the team. The following season, he played 13 games in the Major League and scored a goal against Volyn Lutsk. However, in the course of the season, the player left the team and moved to the amateur Kremin Kremenchuk. In the 1995/96 and 1996/97 seasons he played for Kalush in Ukrainian Second League. In 1997 he signed a contract with Desna Chernihiv the club of Chernihiv in Ukrainian First League and spent one and a half seasons with it. Later he played for other clubs of the first and second league "Flint", Kalush, Enerhetyk Burshtyn and Naftovyk Dolyna. In 2000, returning to Kalush, he was also the head coach of the team. In 2004, after the end of his playing career, he headed the amateur club "Tuzhilov".

== Honours ==
Spartak Ivano-Frankivsk

- Ukrainian First League: 1993–94
