= Dmytro Romanenko =

Ukrainian footballer

Personal information
- Full name: Романенко Дмитрий Иванович
- Date of birth: 1 May 1980 (age 46)
- Place of birth: Chernihiv, Ukrainian SSR, Soviet Union
- Position: Defender

Senior career*
Years	Team	Apps	(Gls)
1997–1998	Slavutych	10	(1)
1997–1999	Desna Chernihiv	26	(4)
1998–1999	Dynamo 2 Kyiv	9	(0)
1998–1999	Dynamo 3 Kyiv	7	(0)
1999–2000	Dynamo 2 Kyiv	10	(0)
1999–2000	Dynamo 3 Kyiv	14	(0)
1999–2000	Hoverla Uzhhorod	21	(0)
2001–2004	Naftovyk Okhtyrka	79	(7)
2003–2004	Desna Chernihiv	13	(0)
2004–2005	Stal Alchevsk	15	(0)
2004–2005	Desna Chernihiv	3	(0)
2005–2005	Stal Alchevsk	0	(0)
2005–2007	Mykolaiv	27	(0)
2008	Desna-2 Chernihiv	3	(0)
2008–2009	Arsenal-Kyivshchyna	1	(0)
2009	Polesie Dobryanka	0	(0)
2009	Builder-Energy	0	(0)
2012–2017	Avangard Korukivka	76	(9)
2012–2017	Avers Bakhmach	0	(0)
- * Club domestic league appearances and goals as of 14 November 2021

Dmytro Romanenko (Ukrainian: Романенко Дмитрий Иванович; born 1 May 1980) is a Ukrainian former professional footballer who played as a defender.

== Career ==
Dmytro Romanenko started his football career in his native club Desna Chernihiv. He also performed at their farm team Slavutych-ChNPP. In early 1999, he accepted an invitation from Dynamo Kyiv, but played only in the second and third teams of Dynamo. Later he moved to Hoverla Uzhhorod, and then to Naftovyk Okhtyrka. In 2004 he returned to Desna Chernihiv. In the winter of 2005 he became a player of Alchevsk "Steel", which played in the Ukrainian Premier League. Then I passed to Mykolaiv. 2008 began as part of the amateur club Desna-2 Chernihiv. Then he played 1 match in the shirt of the second league Kyiv Arsenal-Kyivshchyna. After that he played at the amateur level for "Polissya" (Dobryanka), "Budivel-Energiya" (Ripky), "Avangard" (Koryukivka) and Avers Bakhmach.
