= Ihor Krapyvkin =

Ukrainian footballer and coach

Personal information
- Full name: Ihor Yevhenovych Krapyvkin
- Date of birth: 14 May 1966
- Place of birth: Dnipropetrovsk, Soviet Union (now Dnipro, Ukraine)
- Date of death: 18 February 2021 (aged 54)
- Place of death: Kryvyi Rih, Ukraine
- Height: 1.84 m (6 ft 0 in)
- Position: Goalkeeper

Senior career*
Years	Team	Apps	(Gls)
1985	Kryvbas Kryvyi Rih	4	(0)
1987	SKA Odesa	24	(0)
1987	Krystal Kherson	23	(0)
1987–1989	SKA Odesa	61	(0)
1990	Chornomorets Odesa	0	(0)
1991–1993	Bukovyna Chernivtsi	53	(0)
1993–1995	Prykarpattia Ivano-Frankivsk	24	(0)
1994–1996	Chemlon Humenné	8	(0)
1996–1997	Tysmenytsia	2	(0)
1996–1997	Prykarpattia Ivano-Frankivsk	3	(0)
1997–1999	Desna Chernihiv	18	(0)
1998–1999	Mykolaiv	6	(0)
1999–2000	Bukovyna Chernivtsi	0	(0)
1999–2000	Polissya Zhytomyr	6	(0)
1999–2000	Papirnyk Malyn	1	(0)
2000–2001	Bukovyna Chernivtsi	7	(0)

Managerial career
- 2002–2003: Kryvbas Kryvyi Rih (goalkeeping coach)
- * Club domestic league appearances and goals as of 2 January 2022

Ihor Yevhenovych Krapyvkin (Ukrainian: Ігор Євгенович Крапивкін; 14 May 1966 – 18 February 2021) was a Ukrainian footballer and goalkeeping coach.

== Career ==
Ihor Krapyvkin is a pupil of Dnipropetrovsk football. In 1984 he performed in the double "Dnieper". Not having a chance to make his debut as a member of the USSR champions, he went to gain experience in the teams of the second league "Kryvbass" and "Crystal". He served in the SKA in Odesa.

From 1991 to 1993 he defended the door of Bukovyna Chernivtsi. In this team, Igor made his debut in the first league of the USSR championship, and then - on March 7, 1992, and in the top league of the Ukrainian championship (the first match against "Niva" Ternopil - 2: 1). In the 1993–94 season, the Chernivtsi team fought for survival in the top league and released Krapivkin to the first league Spartak Ivano-Frankivsk. During the season in Spartak Ivano-Frankivsk, Igor played 12 matches and won gold medals with the team in the first league of the Ukrainian championship. After playing half of the season in the major league for Spartak Ivano-Frankivsk, he moved to the Slovak team of the major league "Hemlon" (Humenne). Winner of the Slovak Cup 1995–96.

In 1996 he returned to Ukraine. After returning he played in the teams Spartak Ivano-Frankivsk, Khutrovyk Tysmenytsia, Desna Chernihiv, Mykolaiv, Polissya Zhytomyr, "Bumazhnik". In 1997 he was a member of the Russian team Druzhba Maykop. He finished his career in 2001 in "Bukovina". In total, he played 68 official matches for Bukovyna Chernivtsi in the championship and 7 in the cup).

In total, he played 52 matches in the Premier League of Ukraine, conceding 78 goals (Bukovyna Chernivtsi(33 matches, 43 conceded), Prykarpattia (13 matches, 19 conceded), Mykolaiv (6 goals, 16 conceded))

== Coaching career ==
In the 2002–03 season he coached Kryvbas Kryvyi Rih goalkeepers. In 2005 he coached the backup of the Kryvyi Rih team. Participated in matches of Kryvbass veterans.
