= Andriy Kyslenko =

Ukrainian footballer

Andrey Kislenko
Personal information
- Date of birth: 20 March 1982 (age 44)
- Place of birth: Chernihiv, Ukrainian SSR, USSR
- Height: 1.84 m (6 ft 0 in)
- Position: Defender

Youth career
- 1999: Yunist Chernihiv

Senior career*
Years	Team	Apps	(Gls)
1999–2000	Desna Chernihiv	2	(0)
2001	FC Ros Bila Tserkva 2	1	(0)
2001–2002	Ros Bila Tserkva	13	(2)
2001–2003	CSKA Kyiv	25	(0)
2003–2005	Dnipro Cherkasy	22	(1)
2004–2006	Stal Kamianske	32	(1)
2006–2007	Knyazha Shchaslyve	16	(0)
2007–2008	Feniks-Illichovets Kalinine	7	(0)
2008–2009	CSKA Kyiv	6	(0)
- * Club domestic league appearances and goals as of 30 January 2022

Andrey Kislenko (Ukrainian: Кисленко Андрей Вячеславович) is a retired Ukrainian professional footballer who played as a defender.

== Career ==
Andrey Kislenko started his career in 1999 with Yunist Chernihiv a club in the city of Chernihiv. In the same year he moved to Desna Chernihiv, the main club of the city, where he played 2 matches in Ukrainian Second League in the season 1999–2000 and get 9 place in the league. In 2001 he played 1 match with FC Ros Bila Tserkva 2 and 13 matches for Ros Bila Tserkva scoring 2 goals. In 2001 he moved to CSKA Kyiv where he stayed until 2003, where he played 25 matches. In 2002 he moved to Dnipro Cherkasy where he played 22 matches and scored 1 goal. In summer 2004 he moved to Stal Kamianske for two season where he played 32 matches and scored 1 goal. In 2006 he moved to Knyazha Shchaslyve where he played 16 matches and in 2007 he played 7 matches with Feniks-Illichovets Kalinine. In 2009 he moved back to CSKA Kyiv where he played 6 matches.
