= Valeriy Shapovalov =

Soviet footballer and Ukrainian coach

Personal information
- Date of birth: 27 August 1976 (age 50)
- Place of birth: Odesa, Ukrainian SSR, USSR
- Height: 1.84 m (6 ft 1/2 in)
- Position: Defender

Youth career
- ????–1992: SDYuShOR Chornomorets Odesa

Senior career*
Years	Team	Apps	(Gls)
1992–1994	SC Odesa	40	(0)
1994–1995	Dynamo-Flash Odesa	33	(1)
1996	Bukovyna Chernivtsi	16	(2)
1996	Dnipro Dnipropetrovsk	1	(0)
1997	Zirka Kirovohrad	7	(0)
1997	Kryvbas Kryvyi Rih	8	(0)
1998	Desna Chernihiv	15	(1)
1998–2000	Zirka Kirovohrad	54	(6)
1998–2000	→ Zirka-2 Kirovohrad	7	(1)
2000–2001	Metalurh Zaporizhzhia	5	(0)
2000–2001	→ Metalurh-2 Zaporizhzhia	13	(1)
2002	Mykolaiv	26	(5)
2003	Ordabasy	28	(2)
2004	Belshina Bobruisk	9	(0)
2005–2006	Ordabasy	51	(3)
2007	Okzhetpes	25	(2)

Managerial career
- 2009: Okzhetpes
- 2015–2016: Zirka Kirovohrad (assistant)
- 2016: Inhulets Petrove (assistant)
- 2023–2024: Trostianets
- * Club domestic league appearances and goals

Valeriy Shapovalov (Ukrainian: Валерій Валерійович Шаповалов) is a Ukrainian retired footballer.

== Career ==
He started playing football in his native Odesa. From 1993 to 1995 he played in the Odesa teams SC Odesa and "Dynamo-SKA". In 1996 he moved to Dnipro Dnipropetrovsk, where on October 26 of the same year in the game against Ternopil "Nyva" he made his debut in the Vyshcha Liha. Unable to become a player of the main team of Dnipro, Shapovalov continued his career in other teams of the top division: Zirka, Kryvbas Kryvyi Rih, Metalurh Zaporizhzhia. In total, he played 75 games in the top league of the Ukrainian championship, played a total of 241 matches for Ukrainian clubs at the professional level and scored 24 goals.

From 2003 to 2007 (with a break: 2004 - Belshina Bobruisk) he played in Kazakhstan in the teams Ordabasy Shymkent. He played 104 matches and scored 7 goals in the Super League. In 2008 he ended his playing career.

== Coaching career ==
In 2009 he worked in the coaching staff of Eduard Glazunov in the team "Okzhetpes". From August 2009, after the removal of Glazunov, he led this team as and. at. head coach. He held this position until December of the same year, when Sergei Gerasimets was appointed coach of the team. In 2015 he was appointed assistant head coach of Zirka Kirovohrad, where he worked until August 2016. Then he continued to work as an assistant to Serhiy Lavrynenko in Petrove "Inhulets".
