= Volodymyr Vanin =

Soviet footballer and Ukrainian coach

Personal information
- Full name: Высочанский Игорь Брониславович
- Date of birth: 3 May 1968 (age 58)
- Place of birth: Chernihiv Ukrainian SSR, USSR
- Height: 1.84 m (6 ft 0 in)
- Position: Forward

Senior career*
Years	Team	Apps	(Gls)
1992–1993	Dynamo-2 Kyiv	23	(3)
1993–1994	Viktor Zaporizhia	31	(27)
1994–1995	Metalurh Zaporizhzhia	23	(5)
1994–1995	Viktor Zaporizhia	6	(8)
1995–1996	Metalurh Zaporizhzhia	6	(1)
1995–1997	Viktor Zaporizhia	36	(11)
1997–1998	Metalurg Nikopol	20	(2)
1997–1998	Viktor Zaporizhia	9	(0)
1999	Sintez Shymkent	6	(0)
1999	Taraz	10	(1)
2000–2001	Desna Chernihiv	74	(8)
- * Club domestic league appearances and goals as of 13 January 2022

Volodymyr Vanin (Ukrainian: Высочанский Игорь Брониславович) is a retired Ukrainian footballer who played as a midfielder.

== Career ==
Volodymyr Vanin started his football career in 1991 as a member of the double of Metalurh Zaporizhzhia. The following year he accepted an invitation from Dynamo Kyiv, but due to huge competition in the first team, Kyiv did not get a chance to prove himself. Therefore, he was sent to the second Dynamo team, for which he made his debut on March 17, 1992, in a draw (0: 0) away match of the 2nd round of subgroup 1 of the First League against Alchevsk "Steel". Volodymyr came on the field in the starting lineup and played the whole match. He scored his debut goal for Kyiv on May 6, 1992, in the 61st minute of the victorious (2: 1) home match of the 14th round of subgroup 1 of the First League against Sumy. Vanin came on in the 46th minute, replacing Dmytro Zubakha. He played for Dynamo-2 Kyiv for one and a half seasons. During this time he played 24 matches (3 goals) in the Ukrainian First League, played 2 more matches in the Ukrainian Cup.

On the eve of the start of the 1993–94 season, he moved to the Victor Transitional League club of Zaporizhzhya. He played 31 matches for the new team in his debut season, scoring 27 goals. He helped the team win bronze medals in the championship, and he became the top scorer of the championship. He started the 1994–95 season in Ukrainian Second League, he played 6 matches in which he scored 8 goals. Due to his high performance, Volodymyr was noticed by the more famous Zaporizhzhya club, Metallurg, and in early September 1994 he joined Metallurg. He made his debut in the new team on September 10, 1994, in the victorious (1: 0) home match of the 8th round of the Ukrainian Premier League against Rivne's Veres. Vanin came on the field in the starting lineup, and in the 59th minute he was replaced by Oleg Lipsky. He scored his debut goal in the Premier League on October 2, 1994, in the 22nd minute of a draw (1: 1) home match of the 11th round against Dynamo Kyiv. Volodymyr came on the field in the starting lineup and played the whole match. In the Premier League, he played 29 matches for Metalurh and scored 6 goals, and played 4 more matches (1 goal) in the Ukrainian Cup.

During the winter break of the 1995–96 season, he returned to Victor. He made his debut for Viktor Zaporizhia after his return on April 2, 1996, in a lost (0: 1) away match of the 23rd round of Group B of the Second League against "Vanguard-Industry". Vanin came on in the 58th minute to replace Volodymyr Lobanov. He scored his debut goal for the Zaporizhzhya team on April 5, 1996, in the 36th minute of the winning (4: 0) away match of the 24th round of Group B of the Second League against Shakhtar Sverdlovsk. Volodymyr came on the field in the starting lineup and played the whole match. He played two seasons in the team, during this time he played 45 matches (11 goals) in the Second League, played 2 more matches (1 goal) in the Cup of Ukraine. During the winter break of the 1997–98 season, he transferred to Metalurh Nikopol. He made his debut in the T-shirt of the Nikopol club on March 27, 1998, in the victorious (1: 0) home match of the 23rd round of the First League against Uzhhorod's Verkhovyna. Volodymyr came on in the 55th minute, replacing Serhiy Lyutikov. He scored his debut goal for Metallurg on April 22, 1998, in the 30th minute of the victorious (2: 1) away match of the 29th round of the First League against Chernivtsi's Bukovyna. Vanin came out in the starting lineup, and in the 86th minute he was replaced by Sergei Lyutikov. He played 20 matches for Metalurh and scored 2 goals.

He spent the 1999 season in the clubs of the Premier League of Kazakhstan - Sintez Shymkent (6 matches in the championship, 2 matches and 1 goal in the National Cup) and Taraz (10 matches in the championship, 1 goal).

In 2001 he returned to Ukraine, where he signed a contract with Desna Chernihiv. He made his debut as a member of the Chernihiv team on April 22, 2001, in a lost (0: 1) away match of the 20th round of Group B of the Ukrainian Second League against Kharkiv "Arsenal". Vladimir came on the field in the starting lineup, and in the 33rd minute he was replaced by Oleg Sobekh. The only goal in the Desna T-shirt was scored on June 11, 2001, in the 80th minute of the winning (3: 1) away match of the 28th round of Group B of the Second League against Poltava's Vorskla-2. Volodymyr went on the field in the starting lineup and played the whole match. In the spring-summer part of the 2000–01 season in the Ukrainian Second League where he played 8 matches and scored 1 goal. The following season he did not play in the Ukrainian championship, played 1 match in the Ukrainian Cup. He spent the second half of the 2001–02 season in Zaporizhzhya ZALK. He played 2 matches in the amateur championship of Ukraine. At the end of the season he finished his playing career.
