= Yaroslav Zayats =

Soviet footballer and Ukrainian coach

Yuriy Yakovenko
Personal information
- Full name: Яковенко, Юрий Викторович
- Date of birth: 8 December 1960 (age 65)
- Place of birth: Ukrainian SSR, USSR
- Height: 1.84 m (6 ft 0 in)
- Position: Defender

Senior career*
Years	Team	Apps	(Gls)
1980–1990	Nyva Vinnytsia	330	(20)
1990–1994	Błękitni Kielce	94	(2)
1994–1995	Bukovyna Chernivtsi	19	(0)
1994–1995	Nyva Vinnytsia	9	(0)
1995–1997	Bukovyna Chernivtsi	44	(2)
1996–1999	Desna Chernihiv	66	(1)
- * Club domestic league appearances and goals as of 29 November 2021

Yaroslav Zaiats (Ukrainian: Заяць Ярослав Миколайович) is a Soviet and Ukrainian former professional footballer played as a defender.

== Career ==
He began playing at Nyva Vinnytsia from 1980 until 1990, where he played 330 and scored 20 goals. In 1990 he moved to Błękitni Kielce in Poland. Here he stayed until 1994 where he played 94 matches and scored two goals. In 1994 he returned to Ukraine on the football club of Bukovyna Chernivtsi until 1997, where he played 65 matches and scored two goals also with the club got second place in Ukrainian First League in 1995–96. In 1997 he moved to Desna Chernihiv, where he played 66 matches and scored one goal, where he contributed to win the Ukrainian Second League in the season 1996–97.

== Honours ==
Desna Chernihiv

- Ukrainian Second League: 1996–97
