= Viktor Zapara =

Ukrainian former footballer

Personal information
- Full name: Viktor Zapara
- Date of birth: 6 April 1972 (age 54)
- Place of birth: Chernihiv Ukraine
- Height: 1.74 m (5 ft 8 1/2 in)
- Position: Defender

Senior career*
Years	Team	Apps	(Gls)
1992–1996	Nyva Myronivka	93	(10)
1996–1997	Fakel Varva	8	(1)
1996–1997	Nyva Myronivka	8	(0)
1997–1999	Fakel Varva	37	(4)
1998–1999	Veres Rivne	1	(0)
1999–2001	Desna Chernihiv	23	(1)
2001	Nyva Myronivka	4	(0)
2001	FC Nizhyn	2	(0)
2001–2002	Krasyliv	14	(2)
2003	HPZ Varva	9	(0)

Managerial career
- 2018: Rosava-Nasha Ryaba
- * Club domestic league appearances and goals as of 26 November 2022

Viktor Zapara (Ukrainian: Запара Віктор Михайлович; born 6 April 1972) is a Ukrainian former professional footballer who played as a defender.

== Career ==
Zapara began his career at Niva-Borisfen Mironovka in 1992. He spent the majority of his peripatetic career moving between a handful of teams in the Ukrainian lower divisions, most notably Fakel Varva.

== After retirement ==
After the end of his football career he became the manager of Rosava-Nasha Ryaba.

== Honours ==
Niva-Borisfen Mironovka

- Ukrainian First League Runner up:1994–95
