= Oleksandr Selivanov =

Ukrainian footballer

Personal information
- Date of birth: 7 August 1977 (age 49)
- Place of birth: Chernihiv, Ukrainian SSR, USSR
- Height: 1.84 m (6 ft 0 in)
- Position: Defender

Youth career
- 1999: SDYuShOR Desna

Senior career*
Years	Team	Apps	(Gls)
1997–1998	Cheksyl Chernihiv	0	(0)
1998–2001	Desna Chernihiv	46	(2)
2001	Yevropa Pryluky	10	(0)
2001–2002	Desna Chernihiv	0	(0)
2002–2003	Yevropa Pryluky	15	(0)
2003	FC Nizhyn	4	(0)
2003–2004	Enerhetyk Burshtyn	1	(0)
2006	Avanhard Koryukivka	0	(0)
2011–2012	LKT Chernihiv	1	(0)

Managerial career
- 2025–: Desna-3 Chernihiv
- * Club domestic league appearances and goals as of 28 January 2022

Oleksandr Selivanov (Ukrainian: Олександр Анатолійович Селіванов) is a retired Ukrainian professional footballer who played as a defender.

== Career ==
Oleksandr Selivanov, started his career with Cheksyl Chernihiv a club in Chernihiv without playing. In 1998 he moved to Desna Chernihiv in Ukrainian First League, here he managed to played 16 matches in the season 1998–99 but the club got relegated in Ukrainian Second League. In the season 1999–2000 he managed to play 13 matches and scored 2 goal and the club got 9th place in the league. In the season 2000–01 he got 2 place with the club and he managed to play 17 matches. He also played 10 matches with Yevropa Pryluky, then he returned to Desna Chernihiv without playing a single match. In summer 2002 he moved back to Yevropa Pryluky where he played 15 matches and 4 matches with FC Nizhyn. In 2003 he moved to Enerhetyk Burshtyn where he played only 1 match. In 2006 he moved to Avanhard Koryukivka without playing and in 2012 he played 1 match with LKT Chernihiv.
