= Kostyantyn Poznyak =

Ukrainian footballer

Konstantin Poznyak
Personal information
- Date of birth: 13 November 1977 (age 48)
- Place of birth: Chernihiv, Ukrainian SSR, USSR
- Height: 1.84 m (6 ft 0 in)
- Position: Defender

Youth career
- 1999: SDYuShOR Desna

Senior career*
Years	Team	Apps	(Gls)
1998–2005	Desna Chernihiv	144	(1)
2005–2006	Hirnyk Kryvyi Rih	8	(0)
2006	Avanhard Koryukivka	1	(0)
2011–2013	Niva Chernihiv	13	(0)
- * Club domestic league appearances and goals as of 30 January 2022

Konstantin Poznyak (Ukrainian: Константин Владимирович Позняк) is a retired Ukrainian professional footballer who played as a defender.

== Career ==
Konstantin Poznyak, started his career in 1998 with Desna Chernihiv the club in the city of Chernihiv. Here he stayed until 2005 where he played 144 and scored 1 goal in 1999–2000 in Ukrainian Second League. In 2000–01 he played 27 matches in Ukrainian Second League where he got 2 place in the league and in the season 2001–02 he played 29 matches. In 2005 he moved to Hirnyk Kryvyi Rih in Ukrainian Second League where in the season 2005–06 where he played 8 matches. In 2006 he moved to Avanhard Koryukivka and in 2011 he moved to Niva Chernihiv where in 2012 he played 13 matches.
