= Artur Zapadnya =

Ukrainian footballer (born 1990)

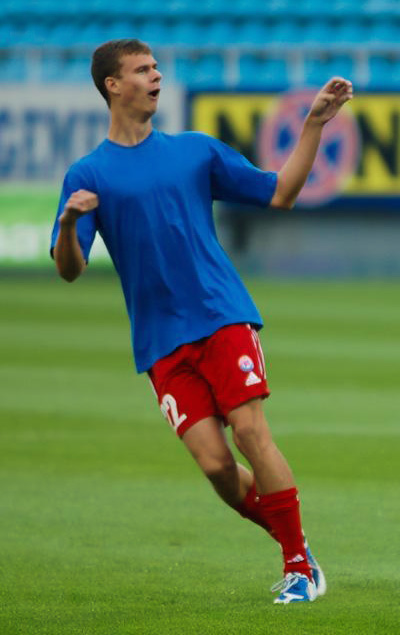
- Artur Zapadnya in 2009.

Personal information
- Full name: Artur Volodymyrovych Zapadnya
- Date of birth: 4 June 1990 (age 36)
- Place of birth: Pershotravensk, Ukrainian SSR
- Height: 1.83 m (6 ft 0 in)
- Position: Defender

Youth career
- 2005: Volyn Lutsk
- 2005–2006: Nafkom Brovary
- 2007: FC Monolit Illichivsk

Senior career*
Years	Team	Apps	(Gls)
2008–2011	Illichivets Mariupol	14	(0)
2012–2013	Vorskla Poltava	2	(0)
2013–2014	Metalurh Zaporizhya	0	(0)
2014–2016	Sumy	58	(4)
2016–2018	Veres Rivne	49	(0)
2018	Lviv	17	(1)
2019	Volyn Lutsk	11	(0)
2019–2020	Desna Chernihiv	9	(0)
2021	Metalist 1925 Kharkiv	27	(1)
2022–2023	Maktaaral	13	(0)

International career^{‡}
2010–2011	Ukraine U21	5	(0)
- * Club domestic league appearances and goals as of 10 July 2022 ‡ National team caps and goals as of 26 January 2022

Artur Zapadnya (Ukrainian: Артур Володимирович Западня; born 4 June 1990) is a Ukrainian football defender.

== Career ==
Zapadnya made his first team debut in a Premier League match against FC Kryvbas Kryvyi Rih on 9 May 2009, and was substituted in first time. In February 2012, he signed a contract with the Ukrainian Premier League's club FC Vorskla Poltava for 1 year with possibility to extend it for one more year. In 2019 he moved to Volyn Lutsk, where he played 11 matches.

=== Desna Chernihiv ===
In summer 2019 he signed for FC Desna Chernihiv, the main club in the city of Chernihiv in Ukrainian Premier League. With the club, he was promoted for the Europa League third qualifying round, for the first time in the history of the club. In January 2021, with agree with the club his contract was ended.

=== Metalist 1925 Kharkiv ===
On 9 January 2021 he signed for Metalist 1925 Kharkiv in Ukrainian First League. On 15 March 2021 he made his debut with the new team against Alians Lypova Dolyna in the winning match for 2-1. On 23 September 2021 he played in Ukrainian Cup against Epitsentr Dunaivtsi getting into the Round of 16 of the competition in the season 2021-22. On 22 October 2021 he scored against Inhulets Petrove in Ukrainian Premier League in the season 2021-22. In January 2022, his contract with the club was ended.

=== Maktaaral ===
In January 2022, he moved to Maktaaral in Kazakhstan Premier League.

== International career ==
He was several times called up to the Ukraine national under-21 football team, including for the match against Malta U21 on 29 May 2010.

== Honours ==
Metalist 1925 Kharkiv

- Ukrainian First League: 2020-21

Veres Rivne

- Ukrainian First League: 2016–17
