= Vadym Lazorenko =

Ukrainian football manager (born 1965)

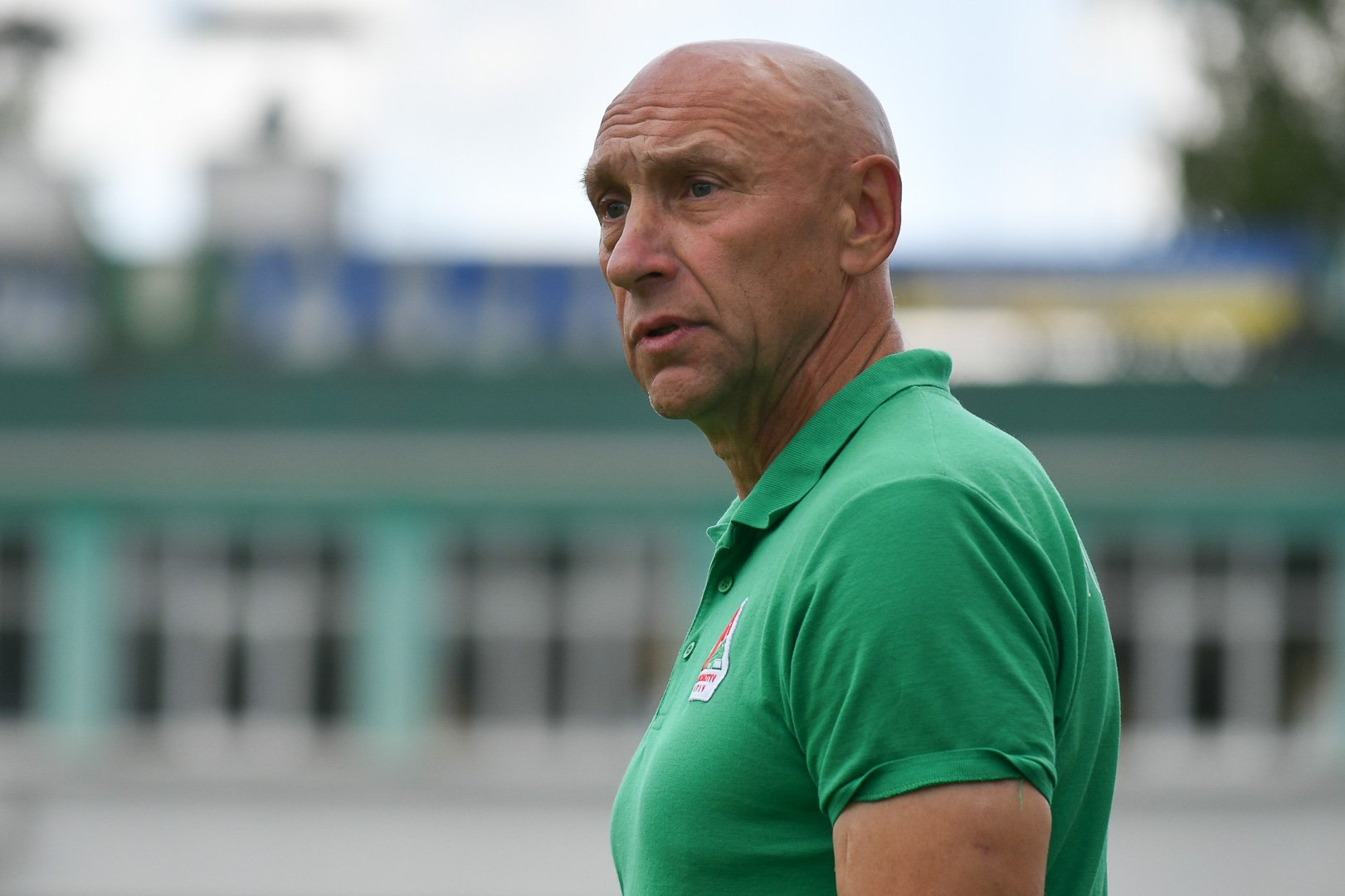

Personal information
- Full name: Vadym Mykolayovych Lazorenko
- Date of birth: 1 March 1965 (age 61)
- Place of birth: Kyiv, Ukrainian SSR
- Position: Defender

Youth career
- 19??–1983: Dynamo Kyiv

Senior career*
Years	Team	Apps	(Gls)
1983–1984	FC Dynamo Irpin	18	(0)
1986	FC Nyva Ternopil	9	(0)
1987–1991	FC Dynamo Bila Tserkva	200	(14)
1991–1992	FC VSS Košice	??	(??)

Managerial career
- 1994–1995: FC Skhid Slavutych
- 1996–1997: FC Systema-Boreks Borodyanka
- 1997–1999: FC Obolon-PPO Kyiv
- 1999–2000: FC Borysfen Boryspil
- 2001–2003: FC Ros Bila Tserkva
- 2003–2005: FC Desna Chernihiv
- 2005: FC Arsenal Kyiv (reserves)
- 2006–2007: FC Arsenal Kyiv (assistant)
- 2008: FC Stal Dniprodzerzhynsk
- 2009–2011: FC Yednist Plysky
- 2011–2012: FC Volyn Lutsk (assistant)
- 2012: FC Metalurh Zaporizhia (assistant)
- 2013–2019: FC Vorskla Poltava (assistant)
- 2019: Ararat Yerevan
- 2023–2025: Lokomotyv Kyiv
- * Club domestic league appearances and goals

Vadym Lazorenko (Ukrainian: Вадим Миколайович Лазоренко, born 1 March 1965 in Kyiv) is a former Soviet footballer and Ukrainian football manager.
