= Viktor Lytvyn =

Ukrainian footballer

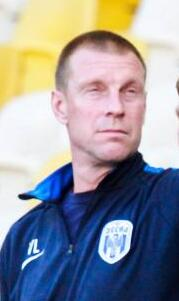

Personal information
- Full name: Viktor Mykolayovych Lytvyn
- Date of birth: 8 January 1976 (age 50)
- Place of birth: Chernihiv, Ukrainian SSR, USSR
- Height: 1.84 m (6 ft 0 in)
- Position: Goalkeeper

Senior career*
Years	Team	Apps	(Gls)
1996–1998	Slavutych-ChAES Slavutych	22	(0)
1998–2001	Desna Chernihiv	15	(0)
2001–2005	Nizhyn	44	(0)
2005–2008	Desna Chernihiv	38	(0)
2007–2008	Feniks-Illichovets Kalinine	8	(0)
2008–2009	Desna Chernihiv	0	(0)
2008–2009	Desna-2 Chernihiv	9	(0)
2010–2011	Desna Chernihiv	7	(0)
2017–2018	Kudrivka	5	(0)
- * Club domestic league appearances and goals as of 1 May 2025

Viktor Mykolayovych Lytvyn (Ukrainian: Віктор Миколайович Литвин) is a Ukrainian retired professional footballer.

== Career ==
Viktor Lytvyn started his career in 1996 with Nerafa Slavutych (later known as Slavutych-ChAES Slavutych) where he played 23 matches. In 1998 he moved to Desna Chernihiv the main club of the city of Chernihiv. Here he played 15 matches and then in 2001 he moved to FC Nizhyn. In 2005 he moved back to Desna Chernihiv until 2008 where he played 38 matches and he won the Ukrainian Second League in the season 2005–06. Then he played 8 matches with Feniks-Illichivec (Kalinino). In 2008 he moved again back to Desna Chernihiv without playing and he has been sent to Desna-2 Chernihiv the reserve squad of the club and he played 9 matches, finishing with 7 matches for Desna Chernihiv.

== Honours ==
Desna Chernihiv

- Ukrainian Second League: 2005–06
