= Ruslan Popov =

Ukrainian footballer

Personal information
- Full name: Ruslan Viktorovych Popov
- Date of birth: 9 August 1977 (age 49)
- Place of birth: Chernihiv, Ukrainian SSR
- Height: 1.84 m (6 ft 0 in)
- Position: Defender

Senior career*
Years	Team	Apps	(Gls)
1999–2001	Desna Chernihiv	27	(1)
2001–2002	Spartak Sumy	5	(0)
2002	Nizhyn	7	(0)
2006	Avanhard Koryukivka	1	(0)
- * Club domestic league appearances and goals as of 28 January 2022

Ruslan Viktorovych Popov (Ukrainian: Руслан Вікторович Попов; born 9 August 1977) is a Ukrainian retired professional footballer who played as a defender.

== Career ==
Ruslan Popov started his career in 1999 with Desna Chernihiv in Ukrainian Second League where he managed to play 11 matches and with the club he got 9 place in the league and he played 18 games and scored 1 goal in the season 1999–2000 In the season 2000–01 he played 9 matches and he got second place in the league. In the summer of 2001 he moved back to Spartak Sumy in Ukrainian Second League where he played 5 matches and he managed to win the Ukrainian Second League in 2001–02. In the summer of 2001 he moved to Nizhyn, where he won the Chernihiv Oblast Football Cup in 2002. In 2006 he moved to Avanhard Koryukivka.

== Personal life ==
His son Bohdan Popov is also a professional footballer who plays for Empoli.

== Honours ==
Nizhyn

- Chernihiv Oblast Football Cup: 2002

Spartak Sumy

- Ukrainian Second League: 2001–02
