= Oleksandr Malevanov =

Soviet footballer and Ukrainian coach

Personal information
- Date of birth: 13 February 1974 (age 52)
- Place of birth: Ukrainian SSR, USSR
- Height: 1.84 m (6 ft 1/2 in)
- Position: Defender

Senior career*
Years	Team	Apps	(Gls)
1991–1992	Shakhtar-2 Donetsk	16	(0)
1992–1993	Metalurh Kostyantynivka	30	(0)
1993–1994	Shakhtar Donetsk	7	(0)
1994–1995	Volyn Lutsk	16	(0)
1994–1995	Shakhtar-2 Donetsk	5	(0)
1995–1996	Volyn Lutsk	25	(0)
1996–1998	Metalurh Donetsk	45	(2)
1997–1998	Metalurh-2 Donetsk	12	(2)
1998–1999	Sheriff Tiraspol	16	(0)
2000	fortuna kontarnoe	4	(1)
2001	Monolith Konstantinovka	16	(0)
2001–2002	Desna Chernihiv	16	(0)
2002–2003	Stal Kamianske	3	(0)
- * Club domestic league appearances and goals as of 1 January 2022

Oleksandr Malevanov (Ukrainian: Олександр Васильович Малєванов) is a Ukrainian retired footballer.

== Career ==
Oleksandr Malevanov started playing football at the Novator Youth Sports School, and later continued to improve his football skills at the UOR in Donetsk. In 1991, the young footballer was invited to Shakhtar Donetsk, but did not make his way to the city's main team immediately, but started playing for the Pitmen's second team in the first and second Ukrainian leagues. Malevanov made his debut for Shakhtar's main team only in August 1993, but spent most of his time in reserve, coming on the field only at the end of the match. while playing for Shakhtar-2 Donetsk or Garant's amateur Donetsk club. This situation lasted until the spring of 1995, when Alexander Malevanov, along with other players from Donetsk, including Vadim Solodky and Yuri Sinkov, was invited to another team in the major leagues Volyn Lutsk. Although the defender from Donetsk region immediately became a major player in the Lutsk club, playing 16 matches in the second half of the 1994–1995 season, and 25 matches in the next, but Volyn Lutsk failed the 1995–1996 season and dropped out. to the first league. In this regard, Malevanov and a group of other players joined the Donetsk "Metallurg" in the off-season, and took part in the clash with the team "Crystal" from Kherson for a place in the first league, which was vacated after refusing to participate in Kremenchug. "Petrochemistry". Donetsk club defeated Kherson with a score of 3–1, and also reached the first league. In this match, Alexander Malevanov played in the basis of all 90 minutes of the match. In the first league, the Donetsk club in a tense struggle with Volyn Lutsk and "Dynamo-2" unexpectedly won the championship and won a ticket to the top league. Malevanov was one of the club's main defenders this season, playing 38 matches in the championship. However, with the entry into the top league, the player lost his place in the main lineup of "Methadone", played a number of matches for the second lineup of "Metallurg" in the second league, and started the next season in Sheriff Tiraspol in the Moldovan National Division of Moldova. After a short stay in the Moldovan club, Oleksandr Malevanov returned to Ukraine, where he played for a number of amateur clubs: Fortuna (Shakhtarsk), Monolit (Kostiantynivka), Shakhtar (Luhansk). In early 2002, the footballer played in the Ukrainian Second League for Desna Chernihiv, the main club of the city of Chernihiv. In the second half of 2002, Malevanov became a player of Stal Kamianske, which became the last professional football club. After completing his professional football career, Malevanov moved to his native Mariupol, where he played for local amateur teams.

== Honours ==
Sheriff Tiraspol

- Moldovan Cup: 1998–99

Metalurh Donetsk

- Ukrainian First League: 1996–97
