= Ivan Chaus =

Ukrainian politician and entrepreneur

Personal details
- Born: 14 September 1967 (age 58) Chernihiv, Ukrainian SSR
- Party: Servant of the People
- Profession: Businessman

Ivan Petrovych Chaus (Ukrainian: Іван Петрович Чаус; born 14 September 1967) is a Ukrainian businessman and football chairman. In 1992, he became the president of Polissya Dobryanka football club. From 1999 to 2007, he served as the president of Desna Chernihiv football club.

== Biography ==
Chaus was born on 14 April 1967 in Chernihiv, which at the time was part of the Soviet Union. He pursued a career as a businessman in the Chernihiv Oblast and graduated from Taras Shevchenko National University in Chernihiv. Chaus was involved in establishing the historical and cultural center of Sofia Rusova and served as the president of the Sofia Rusova Charitable Foundation. In 2020, he was elected as a deputy of the Chernihiv Regional Council representing the Servant of the People party.

== Football ==
In 1992, Chaus became the president of Polissya Dobryanka. From 1999 to 2007, he served as the president of the third-division side Desna Chernihiv, succeeding Volodymyr Khomenko. In 2006, he facilitated the transfer of Andriy Yarmolenko from Yunist Chernihiv Youth.

Chaus was invited back to assist the club's president, Valeriy Korotkov, and in 2009, he was appointed as Vice-President during the presidency of Oleksandr Povorozniuk, but left the club shortly after his arrival. He later remarked, "When I returned to Desna Chernihiv for the second time in February this year, my primary aim was to cleanse Chernihiv football, freeing it from the recent accumulation of dirt. By dirt, I mean both the bribery of judges and the team being used as a 'bargaining chip' in political games. My intent was genuine because Desna is my home; I devoted almost 10 years of my life to it." Ivan Chaus currently holds the record for the longest-serving president of the club in Chernihiv.

== Personal life ==
He has a son, Maksym Chaus, who was a professional footballer.

== See also ==
- FC Desna Chernihiv
