= FC Khutrovyk Tysmenytsia =

Ukrainian football team

FC Khutrovyk Tysmenytsia (Ukrainian: Футбольний клуб «Хутровик» (Тисмениця)) is a Ukrainian football team based in Tysmenytsia, Ivano-Frankivsk Oblast. The club has existed since the 1950s. It plays in the Ivano-Frankivsk Oblast Second League (season 2018–19).

Following the dissolution of the Soviet Union, Khutrovyk won the 1992 Ivano-Frankivsk Oblast Football Championship First League, the top tier of the regional football competitions. In the final Khutrovyk defeated their main opponent, Khimik Kalush 4:3. The win gave the club a jump start when it began their participation in the Ukrainian national football competitions. The club joined the 1992–93 Ukrainian Football Championship for KFK teams, where they finished first in their group. The club was managed by Yaroslav Dumanskyi. One of their forwards Serhiy Turyanskyi became the top goalscorer for their group.

In 1993, Khutrovyk joined the Ukrainian Transitional League (Perekhidna Liha), which was the fourth tier of the Ukrainian national football league system in the early 1990s and above the national amateur competitions (KFK-level competitions at that time). They played their first game in the 1993–94 Ukrainian Transitional League on 31 August 1993, when they visited Prometei Khartsyzk, coached by the Shakhtar legend Mykhaylo Sokolovskyi. Khutrovyk won the match 1:0 at the Stadion "Stalekanatnyk" in Khartsyzk; Vasyliv was the sole goalscorer in the game. At the end of the season, they placed 9th among 18 participating teams.

In 1994, the Transitional League was renamed the Third League. The 1994–95 Ukrainian Third League season was the last for the tier, which was discontinued in 1995 with better members joining the higher tier. Khutrovyk started the season under the new manager Borys Pazukhin. They started the season with two games at home which they won both with goal difference of 7:1. The Tysmenytsia team finished 3rd among 22 participants and easily qualified for the higher tier. The goalkeeper Serhiy Stashko was among the best goalies that season with the team placing 2nd in goals conceded.

The club's main team spent three years in the Ukrainian Second Division before it withdrew at the end of the 1997–98 season.

== League and cup history ==
Season	Div.	Pos.	Pl.	W	D	L	GS	GA	P	Domestic Cup	Europe	Notes
1995–96	3rd "A"	3	40	24	3	13	66	33	75			
1996–97	3rd "A"	3	30	17	7	6	41	21	58			
1997–98	3rd "A"	17	34	11	5	18	35	49	38			Relegation playoff winner withdrew
