= List of FC Desna Chernihiv managers =

List of all managers of Ukrainian football club FC Desna Chernihiv.

== Managers ==
- Figures correct as of December 2, 2020. Includes all competitive matches

* Player-manager
+ Caretaker manager
M = Matches played; W = Matches won; D = Matches drawn; L = Matches lost; F = Goals for; A = Goals against

Name	Nationality	From	To	M	W	D	L	F	A	Win%	Honours	Notes
Oleksandr Shchanov	Soviet Union	1960	1960									
Anatoly Zhyhan	Soviet Union	1960	1960									
Yosyp Lifshyts	Soviet Union	1961	1961									
Yevgeny Goryansky	Soviet Union	1962	1963									
Mykhaylo Chyrko	Soviet Union	1963	1963									
Vadim Radzishevskiy	Soviet Union	1964	1964									
Valentin Tugarin	Soviet Union	1965	1966									
Sergei Korshunov	Soviet Union	1966	1966									
Viktor Zhiltsov	Soviet Union	1967	1967									
Yevhen Lemeshko	Soviet Union	1967	1967									
Valentin Tugarin	Soviet Union	1968	1968									
Volodymyr Onyshchenko	Soviet Union	1969	1969									
Oleh Bazylevych	Soviet Union	1969	1970									
Yukhym Shkolnykov	Soviet Union	1977	1982									
Andriy Protsko	Soviet Union	1983	1983									
Yevgeny Goryansky	Soviet Union	1983	1984									
Mykhaylo Fomenko	Soviet Union	1985	1986									
Andriy Protsko	Soviet Union	1987	1987									
Mykhailo Dunets	Soviet Union	1988	1989									
Andriy Protsko+	Soviet Union	1989	1989									
Yuriy Hruznov	Ukraine	1990	1993									
Andriy Protsko+	Ukraine	1993	1993									
Viktor Dubino	Ukraine	1994	1994									
Andriy Protsko	Ukraine	1994	1996									
Yukhym Shkolnykov	Ukraine	1996	1998									
Yuriy Hruznov	Ukraine	1999	2002									
Vadym Lazorenko	Ukraine	2002	2004									
Oleksandr Tomakh	Ukraine	2004	2007									
Serhiy Bakun+	Ukraine	2007	2007									
Serhiy Kucherenko	Ukraine	2007	2008									
Oleksandr Ryabokon	Ukraine	2008	2008									
Mykhailo Dunets	Ukraine	2009	2009									
Yuriy Ovcharov+	Ukraine	2009	2009									
Oleksandr Ryabokon	Ukraine	2009	2010									
Viktor Dohadaylo	Ukraine	2010	2010									
Ikor Khimich+	Ukraine	2010	2010									
Oleh Melnychenko+	Ukraine	2010	2010									
Oleksiy Skala	Ukraine	2010	2010									
Anatoly Byelay	Ukraine	2011	2011									
Oleksandr Deriberin	Ukraine	2011	2012									
Oleksandr Ryabokon	Ukraine	March; 2012	present									
