= List of sports venues in Chernihiv =

This is a full list of sport venues in Chernihiv:

Image:	Venue Name:	Tenants:	Location:
	Olympic sports training center	Desna Chernihiv; Desna-2 Chernihiv; Desna-3 Chernihiv; SDYuShOR Desna	st. Shevchenko, 61, Chernihiv, 14027 Ukraine
	Chernihiv Arena	FC Chernigiv; WFC Lehenda-ShVSM Chernihiv Spartak Chernihiv; FC Desna-2 Chernihiv, SDYuShOR Desna; Desna-3 Chernihiv; Desna-2 Chernihiv	Kiltseva St, 2а, Chernihiv, Chernihiv Oblast, Ukraine 14039
	Yunist Stadium	Yunist Chernihiv; Yunist ShVSM; FC Chernigiv; Olimpik Donetsk; Desna-2 Chernihiv; Desna-3 Chernihiv	Chernihivs'ka, Chernihiv, Ukraine, 16624
	Tekstylschyk stadium	WFC Lehenda-ShVSM Chernihiv; FC Cheksyl Chernihiv (Defunct)	vul. Ivana Mazepi, 66, Chernihiv, Ukraine, 16624,
	Lokomotiv stadium	Desna Chernihiv; WFC Lehenda-ShVSM Chernihiv; FC Desna-2 Chernihiv	vulytsia Zhabynskoho, 19 Chernihiv, Ukraine, 16624,
	Khimik Sport Complex	Khimik Chernihiv; FC Chernihiv; Desna-2 Chernihiv; Desna-3 Chernihiv; FC Udar Chernigov	Ivana Mazepy St, 78, Chernihiv, Ukraine 14039
	Nastolny Tennis Sport Complex	Chernihiv Tennis Team	Honcha vulytsia, 23, Chernihiv, Ukraine
	Backyard Sport Court Builders	Chernihiv Backyard Sport Court Builders	3 Nosivka, Chernihiv, Ukraine
