= Ultras Desna =

Supporters' group of Desna Chernihiv

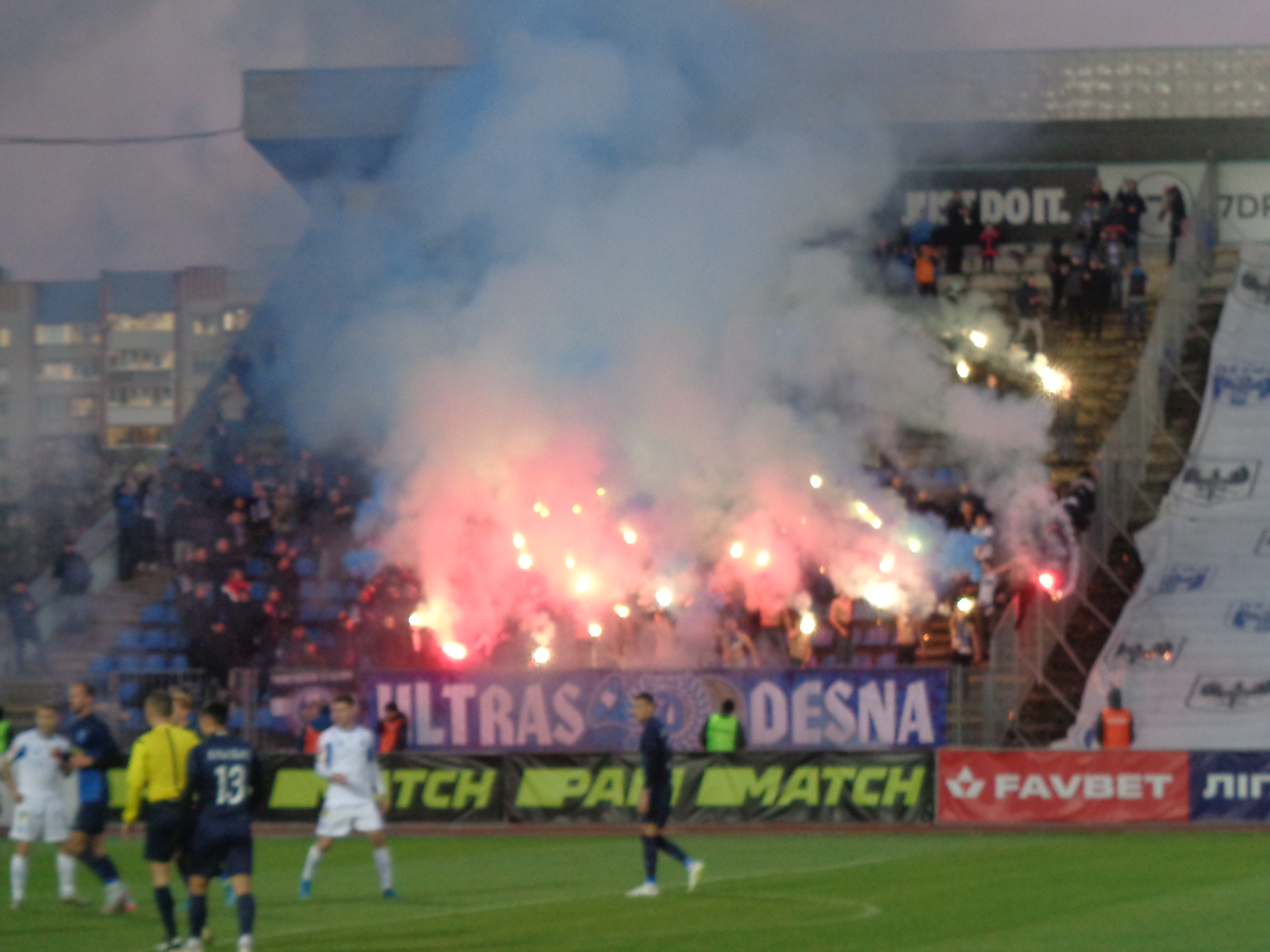
- North Block during a match against Dynamo Kyiv (15-12-2019)
- Nickname: North Block
- Established: 1989–present
- Type: Supporters' group Ultras group
- Team: Desna Chernihiv
- Motto: DESNA
- Location: Chernihiv, Ukraine
- Arena: Chernihiv Stadium
- Colors: Blue, white

Ultra Desna (Ukrainian: Ультрас Десна) is the organized supporters group of the Ukrainian multi-sports club Desna Chernihiv. They are known for supporting and following their team, at home and away. During Desna's matches, the fans display the teams colours of blue and white.

== History ==
=== Origin ===
The first organized departure of fans for the away match of Desna fans took place on 1 August 1990, when Chernihiv's fans supported their home club in Kyiv. Four Chernihiv enthusiasts came to the match against SKA Kyiv; one of them still supports Desna. For over 16 years, a loyal fan has always been with the team and has more than 170 away games.

In independent Ukraine, a significant surge in attendance, up to 6,520 spectators per game on average in the 2003/04 season, occurred in the first half of the 2000s. The highest attendance at home matches in the championship of Ukraine — 6,684 — was recorded in the 2007/08 season, in which the team took 4th place in the Ukrainian First League. Since 2008, the club team has never been without support in away matches. For eight years, at least one fan is always been with the team no matter the circumstances or weather. In 2010, Desna could have disappeared from the football map of Ukraine, but a team of enthusiasts of led by Oleksiy Chebotaryov saved the situation - Desna not only continues to exist, but also sets maximum goals.

=== Australian fan ===
In 2016, an Australian fan called Ian Brash become a real fan of Desna and constantly traveled from England to Ukraine to see the team playing at home and away, supporting the club. In the same year the club appealed to its fans to choose a new emblem for the club; voting was ended until 22 July 2016 in the Desna's official Facebook page.

In 2017, the club's president Oleksiy Chebotaryov resigned for being wanted by the Ukrainian law enforcement and ran from Ukraine. Club ownership was passed to Volodymyr Levin. Ultras Desna - North Block with some followers of football were pointing out that the club was proudly demonstrating the club's supervisory board without showing any information about the club's owner (a common issue among most Ukrainian professional clubs), three members out of 14 were also current members of the UAF Executive Committee including Hennadiy Prokopovych and Artem Frankov as well as the president of the Ukrainian PFL Serhiy Makarov. They also signed and an electronic petition with a request to return Desna Chernihiv to the Ukrainian Premier League has been registered on the official website of the President of Ukraine, Petro Poroshenko.

In December 2019, during the match against Dynamo Kyiv, the fan show a great choreography for the team and the ground in the stadium after the Dynamo's fan did the same for their club. On 12 March 2020 during the Quarterfinal match in Ukrainian Cup against Vorskla Poltava, in the season 2019-20, the match was played behind closed doors due to quarantine in Ukraine during the COVID-19 pandemic and fans supported the team outside the Stadion Yuri Gagarin. They are also active in many social media like the Russian-based Telegram Channel.

In May 2020, during the play off for the Europa League third qualifying round, during the matches against Dynamo Kyiv and against Kolos Kovalivka, the Ultras Desna - North Block, due to the COVID-19 pandemic, supported Desna from the roof of the library of Tarnovsky (Museum of antiquities), just beside the Chernihiv Stadium.

In November 2020, a group of fans dressed in team-colored caps and scarves showed up at the club's offices, forcing Ovrachenko to leave. They then threw the manager into a garbage can and accompanied him as in a parade through the streets of the city. Immediately the club and the Nord Block group took their distance on this fact, declaring themselves strangers about this fact.

In November 2020, the eagle became the new mascot of Desna Chernihiv. This bird is depicted not as the coat of arms of the city, nor the team logo. In 2020, the club asked their fans to choose the Desna Chernihiv Player of the Year for the season 2020. The result was Oleksandr Filippov with 228 votes, Yevhen Past with 197 votes, Yevhen Past 149 votes. In February 2021, the president of the club Volodymyr Levin expressed his gratitude to the fans to be appeared again in Chernihiv Stadium to support the team, after the situation with the COVID-19 pandemic.

=== Desna Volunteer Center ===
A Desna's fan Andriy (Sheriff) Kozachenko died in the war with Russian hatred. In 2022, the Desna's fan during the russian aggression, set up a volunteer center They buy necessary things for the Armed Forces and go to the front, take people out of hot spots and even catch looters Everyone is trying to help as much as they can. Some are defending the country at the forefront, some are supporting the economy by working in the rear, some are volunteering. In the column of the New Channel #GoodHistories, the public relations specialist of FC Desna Dmytro told how the team of fans became a powerful volunteer center. Together with Vysokyi Val, the Desna Volunteer Center organized great donations of a large number of people, including former and current players of FC Desna (Yehor Kartushov, Andriy Dombrovskyi, Yevhen Selin, Artem Favorov, Denys Favorov, Oleksandr Filippov, Yevhen Past, Vladyslav Kalitvintsev, etc.), significant support was provided to Chernihiv defenders and have already raised one million hryvnias with fundraising, search and purchase of the necessary equipment for the needs of the Armed Forces. On Desna's Instagram channel was published a page on which the Ultras Desna sent an explosive "greeting" to the Russians after the invasion. In August 2022, Ultras Desna burned Oleksandr Masalov's passport Desny fans appealed to the ex-player of the team. Masalov lost his Russian passport at the destroyed Chernihiv Stadium. The left defender, who previously played for Desna, moved to play in Russian for Ufa as a free agent. Ultras of the Chernihiv club recorded an appeal to the football player-traitor and burned Masalov's Russian passport.

== Friendships and rivalries ==
The group consists of fans from Dynamo Kyiv, Kharkiv, Dnipro, Lviv, Stal Kamianske and Ivano-Frankivsk. The group has sporting rivalry with the fans of Polissya Zhytomyr and Cherkashchyna, despite overall friendly relations between the supporter groups.

Friendships

- (Ukraine) Dynamo Kyiv
- (Ukraine) Kharkiv
- (Ukraine) Dnipro
- (Ukraine) Lviv
- (Ukraine) Stal Kamianske
- (Ukraine) Ivano-Frankivsk
- (Ukraine) FC Chernihiv

Rivalries

- (Ukraine) Polissya Zhytomyr
- (Ukraine) Cherkashchyna

== See also ==
- Football culture
- Major football rivalries
- Tifo
- Ultras groups
- Hooliganism
- Football chants
