= Oleksandr Masalov =

Ukrainian footballer (born 1997)

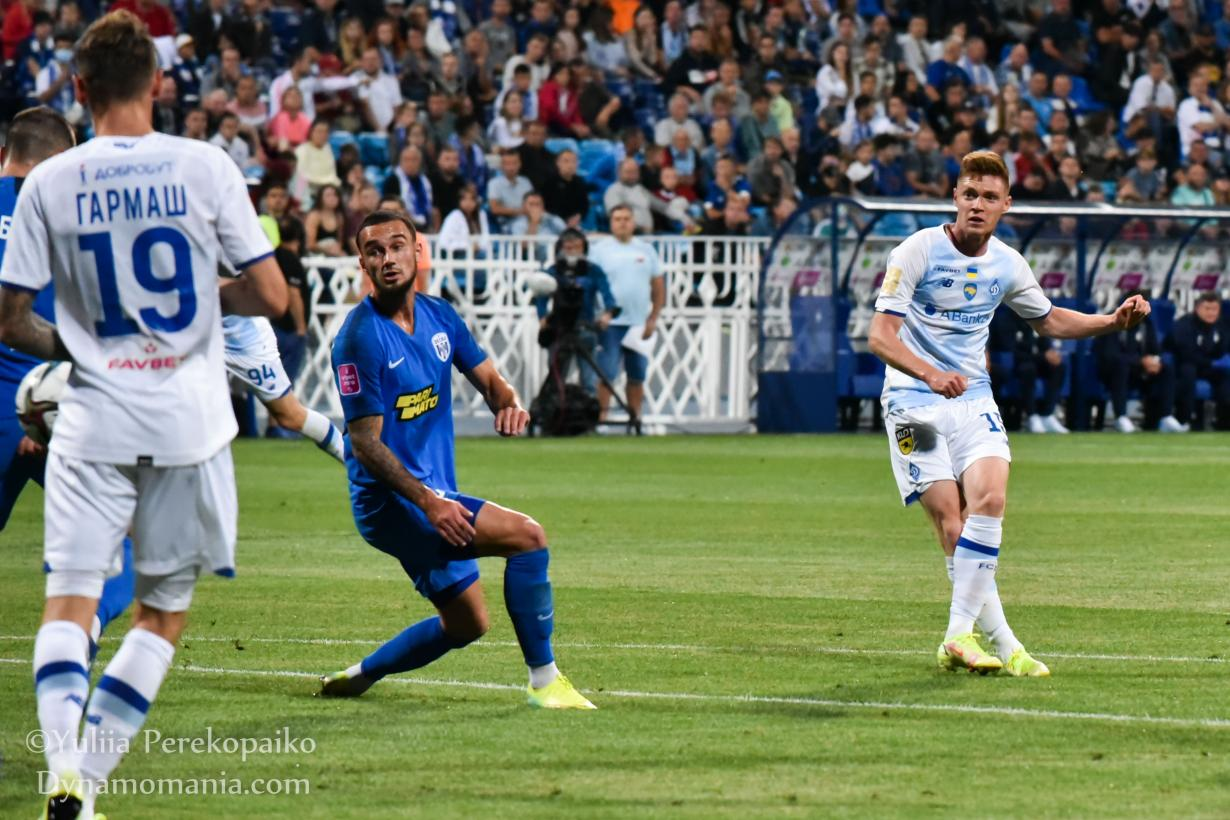

Personal information
- Full name: Oleksandr Oleksandrovych Masalov
- Date of birth: 22 January 1997 (age 29)
- Place of birth: Sevastopol, Ukraine
- Height: 1.87 m (6 ft 2 in)
- Position: Centre-back

Team information
- Current team: Dynamo Saint Petersburg
- Number: 15

Youth career
- –2010: SDYuShOR №5 Sevastopol
- 2011–2016: Dynamo Kyiv
- 2016–2017: Shakhtar Donetsk

Senior career*
Years	Team	Apps	(Gls)
2018–2019	Shakhtar Donetsk	0	(0)
2018	→ Kolos Kovalivka (loan)	9	(0)
2019–2021	Dinamo-Auto Tiraspol	34	(0)
2021–2022	Desna Chernihiv	6	(0)
2022	Ufa	9	(0)
2023	Rubin Yalta	11	(2)
2023	Leon Saturn Ramenskoye	9	(0)
2024	Torpedo Moscow	0	(0)
2024	Dynamo Vologda	8	(0)
2025–	Dynamo St. Petersburg	49	(13)

International career^{‡}
2012	Ukraine U16	2	(1)
2013	Ukraine U17	5	(0)
2015	Ukraine U18	2	(0)
2015	Ukraine U19	2	(0)
- * Club domestic league appearances and goals as of 5 November 2026 ‡ National team caps and goals as of 30 August 2021

Oleksandr Oleksandrovych Masalov (Ukrainian: Олександр Олександрович Масалов; born 22 January 1997) is a Ukrainian professional footballer who plays as a centre-back for Dynamo Saint Petersburg.

== Club career ==
Masalov is a youth product of Dynamo Kyiv. In 2016 he moved to the Shakhtar Donetsk academy.

=== Kolos Kovalivka ===
Masalov started his senior career with Kolos Kovalivka.

=== Dinamo-Auto Tiraspol ===
In 2019 he moved to Dinamo-Auto Tiraspol, where he played 34 matches. He reached the quarter-final of the 2019–20 Moldovan Cup in his first season with the club. On 27 August 2020, he played in the first qualifying of the 2020-21 UEFA Europa League against Ventspils. In the 2020–21 Moldovan Cup, he helped the side reach the semi-final.

=== Desna Chernihiv ===
In August 2021 he moved to Desna Chernihiv the Ukrainian Premier League on a one-year contract. On 14 August he made his league debut for the club against SC Dnipro-1 at the Stadion Yuri Gagarin, replacing Vikentiy Voloshyn at the 74th minute.

=== Ufa ===
In August 2022, he signed for Ufa in the Russian First League. His contract with Ufa was terminated by mutual consent on 7 February 2023.

=== Dynamo Saint Petersburg ===
In February 2025 he signed for Dynamo Saint Petersburg in the Russian Second League.

== Personal life ==
In August 2022, after the confirmation of his move to Russian side Ufa, members of supporters' club "Ultras Desna" recorded a video in which they burned what they alleged to be Masalov's Russian passport. In the video, in which they accused the footballer of "treason," the ultras claimed to have delivered his Ukrainian passport to the national security services, to "let the intelligence services deal with shit like you".

== Career statistics ==
=== Club ===
As of match played 5 November 2026

Appearances and goals by club, season and competition
Club	Season	League			Cup		Europe		Other		Total	
Club	Season	Division	Apps	Goals	Apps	Goals	Apps	Goals	Apps	Goals	Apps	Goals
Kolos Kovalivka	2017-18	Ukrainian First League	9	0	0	0	0	0	0	0	9	0
Dinamo-Auto Tiraspol	2019	Moldovan National Division	8	0	0	0	0	0	0	0	8	0
Dinamo-Auto Tiraspol	2020-21	Moldovan National Division	25	0	2	0	1 (Note: one appearance in Europa League First qualifying round)	0	0	0	28	0
Dinamo-Auto Tiraspol	2021-22	Moldovan National Division	1	0	2	0	0	0	0	0	3	0
Desna Chernihiv	2021-22	Ukrainian Premier League	6	0	0	0	0	0	0	0	6	0
Ufa	2022-23	Russian First League	9	0	1	0	0	0	0	0	10	0
Leon Saturn Ramenskoye	2023	Russian Second League	9	0	1	0	0	0	0	0	10	0
Torpedo Moscow	2023–24	Russian First League	0	0	0	0	0	0	0	0	0	0
Dynamo Vologda	2025	Russian Second League	8	0	0	0	0	0	0	0	8	0
Dynamo Saint Petersburg	2025	Russian Second League	24	6	1	0	0	0	0	0	25	6
Dynamo Saint Petersburg	2026	Russian Second League	25	7	2	2	0	0	0	0	27	9
Career total			124	13	9	2	1	0	0	0	133	15
