= Serhiy Kucherenko (footballer, born 1984) =

Ukrainian footballer

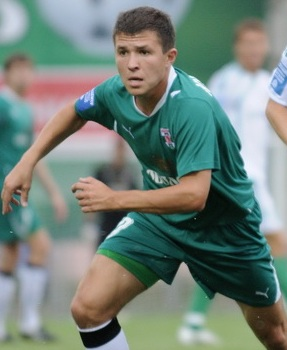

Personal information
- Full name: Serhiy Serhiyovich Kucherenko
- Date of birth: 7 January 1984 (age 42)
- Place of birth: Kirovohrad, Ukrainian SSR, Soviet Union
- Height: 1.74 m (5 ft 9 in)
- Position: Attacking midfielder

Senior career*
Years	Team	Apps	(Gls)
2001	Portovyk Illichivsk	0	(0)
2002-2003	MFC Mykolaiv	2	(0)
2002–2003	Olimpiya FC AES Yuzhnoukrainsk	32	(3)
2003–2006	Podillya Khmelnytskyi	83	(20)
2007	Spartak Ivano-Frankivsk	3	(1)
2007–2009	Desna Chernihiv	57	(13)
2009–2010	Krymteplytsia Molodizhne	57	(13)
2010–2012	Obolon Kyiv	26	(4)
2011–2012	→ Zakarpattia Uzhhorod (loan)	20	(3)
2012	→ Obolon Kyiv	11	(2)
2013–2014	MFK Mykolaiv	23	(5)
2016–2017	Krymteplytsia Molodizhne	30	(0)
- * Club domestic league appearances and goals as of 5 May 2013

Serhiy Serhiiovych Kucherenko (Ukrainian: Сергій Сергійович Кучеренко, romanized: Serhii Serhiiovych Kucherenko; born 7 January 1984) is a Ukrainian former football midfielder.

== Career ==
Born in Kirovohrad in the family of football player and coach Serhiy Petrovich Kucherenko. At the age of two, he moved to Odesa with his family. Kucherenko is a pupil of the local Chornomorets Odesa school, where his father was the coach. In the youth football league of Ukraine he played from 1998 to 2001 for Chornomorets Odesa and the Youth Sports School 11.

In 2001, he was at the disposal of the Portovik club from Ilyichevsk, which played in the Ukrainian Second League of Ukraine. However, as part of the team, he did not play more than one game. In 2002 he was a member of "Mykolaiv". On 27 September 2002, he played the only match for Mykolaiv in the First League of Ukraine in the home game against Stal Alchevsk (2: 1), Kucherenko came out on 77 minutes instead of Vladimir Vozny.

In 2002, he began playing in the Olimpia FC NPP team in the Ukrainian Second League. In total, he played 32 matches for the club and scored 3 goals in the league and 1 match in the Ukrainian Cup. In the second half of the 2003/04 season, he moved to Podillia Khmelnytskyi, where his father was the coach. Also, Kucherenko could go to the Ovidiopol "Dniester". Sergey became the main player in the team. In the winter of 2006, I went to the screening in the Latvian Ventspils, and a year later in the Liepaja Metallurg. However, he did not sign contracts with clubs from Latvia. He spent about three years at Podillia and played in 99 games and scored 23 goals in the championships, in the Obolon Kyiv he played 2 matches and scored 1 goal.

In March 2007, his father became the head of Spartak Ivano-Frankivsk. Together with him, Sergey joined the team. As part of the team, he played only 3 games, in which he scored 1 goal. In the summer of 2007 he played for the Odesa amateur team "Ivan". He played in 2 matches and scored 1 goal in the Ukrainian amateur championship and 3 games in the Regional Cup.

=== Desna Chernihiv ===
In the summer of 2007, Mr Kucherenko headed the Desna Chernihiv and his son became one of the players he invited to his new team. Serhiy played for Desna for a year and a half, became one of the leaders of the club, played 56 games in the Ukrainian First League and scored 13 goals, played 4 matches in the Ukrainian Cup and scored 2 goals. In December 2008, he visited the Kaliningrad "Baltika", and then in the Chornomorets Odesa. In January 2009, Sergei visited Tavriya Simferopol, but did not sign a contract with the club.

After he visited the screening in "Tavria", he received an offer from the youth Krymteplytsia Molodizhne. In February 2009 he became the bronze medalist of the Krymteplitsa Cup. In the match for 3rd place, Krymteplitsa beat Foros (2: 2 regular time and 4: 3 on penalties). As a result, Kucherenko signed a contract with Krymteplitsa in March 2009. In the 2008/09 season, Kucherenko played for the greenhouses in 11 games and scored 4 goals.

The first half of the 2009/10 season was less productive for Kucherenko than the second, he scored 3 goals in 16 games. In February 2010, together with the team, he won the Krymteplitsa Cup, in the final the club beat Energetik Burshtyn (2: 0). In October 2009, "Krymteplitsa" was headed by Alexander Sevidov and in the second half of the season Kucherenko scored 16 goals in 17 matches, including 5 doubles and 1 hat-trick. As a result, acting as a midfielder, with 19 goals scored, he became the top scorer of the First League of the 2009/10 season, and Kucherenko was also recognized as the best player of this season according to the newspaper "Ukrainian Football". In total for Krymteplitsa in the First League he played 44 matches and scored 23 goals, in the Ukrainian Cup he played 3 games and scored 1 goal.

In the summer of 2010, he signed a three-year contract with Obolon Kyiv. According to the site Football.ua, Kucherenko became Obolon Kyiv's top newcomer in the summer transfer window. On 9 July 2010, he made his debut in the Ukrainian Premier League at the age of 26 in a home match against Dynamo Kyiv (2: 2), Kucherenko came out on the 80th minute instead of Igor Plastun. In total, in the first half of the 2010/11 season, he scored 3 goals from penalties in 14 matches and became one of the disappointments of the first round at Obolon Kyiv.

On 9 April 2011, in an away match against Shakhtar Donetsk (0: 1), Kucherenko, at the end of the meeting at the 86th minute, scored the winning goal of Obolon Kyiv against Rustam Khudzhamov with a free-kick. This defeat for Shakhtar Donetsk was the first at the Donbas Arena. In total, in the 2010/11 season, he played 21 matches and scored 4 goals in the Ukrainian Premier League, 1 match in the Ukrainian Cup and 1 match in which he scored 1 goal in the Ukrainian youth championship.

In the summer of 2011 it was put up for transfer. As a result, he transferred on loan to Hoverla-Transcarpathia, where Alexander Sevidov was a coach. Playing for the club for six months, he spent 20 matches in the Ukrainian First League and scored 3 goals and in the Ukrainian Cup 3 games in which he scored 1 goal.

In January 2012 he returned to Obolon Kyiv for which he played until the end of the year. Oleksandr Slobodyan, the president of the club, spoke critically about sending Kucherenko on loan to Zakarpattia.

Since April 2013 he played for the MFC Mykolaiv. 8 September 2016 was announced for the club Krymteplytsia Molodizhne performing in the Crimean regional championship.

== National team ==
In 2007 he was called up to the student team of Ukraine.

== Personal life ==
He is the son of Serhiy Petrovych Kucherenko, who become the coach of Desna Chernihiv.

== Honours ==
Uzhhorod

- Ukrainian First League: 2011–12

Individual

- Top Scorer Ukrainian First League: 2009–10

== Gallery ==
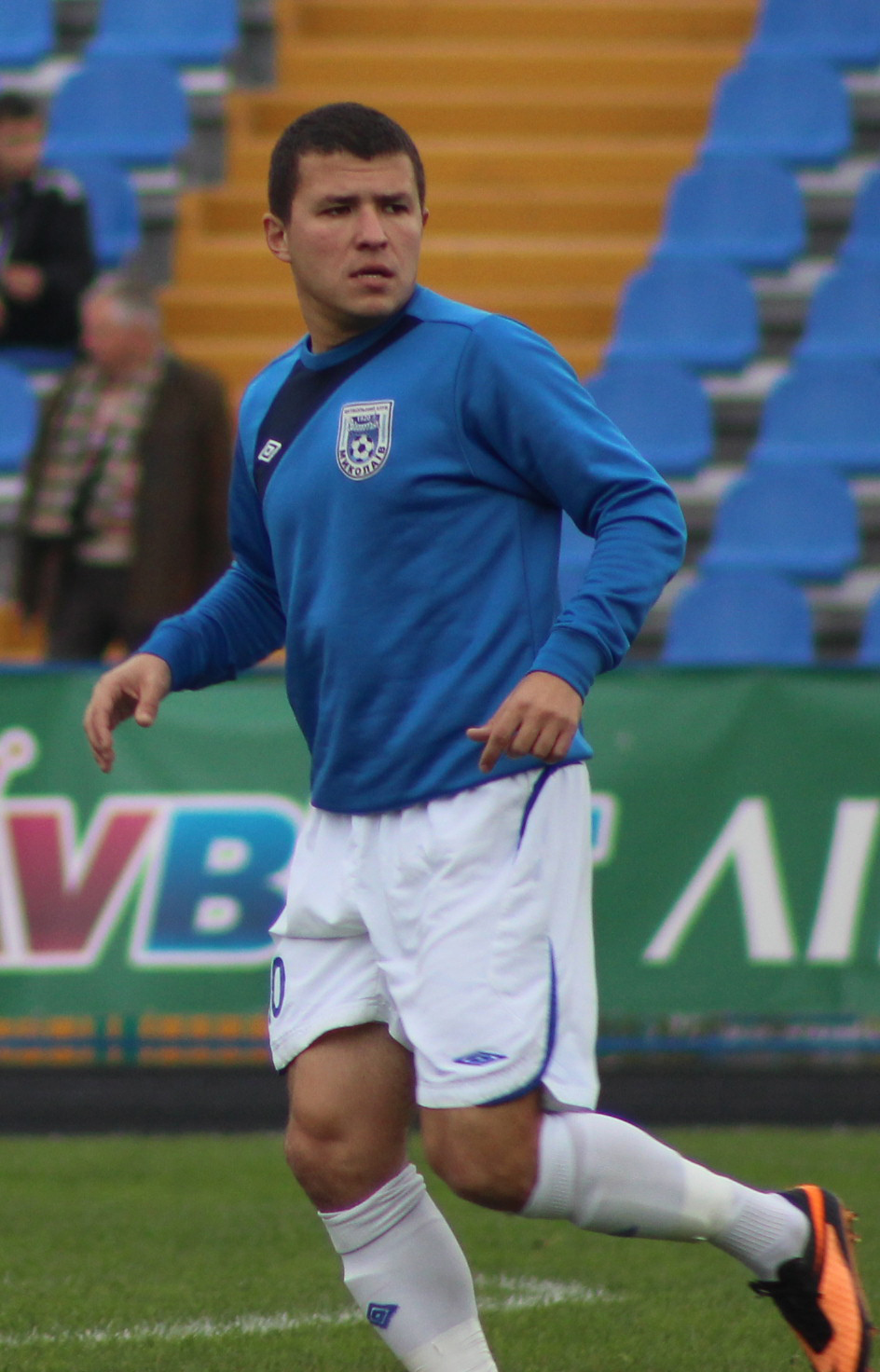
Serhiy Kucherenko
