= Yuriy Tymoshok =

Ukrainian politician and entrepreneur

Тимошок Юрій Миколайович

Personal details
- Born: Yuriy Tymoshok; 12 December 1963 (age 62) Kyiv, Ukrainian SSR, Soviet Union
- Party: Lytvyn Bloc
- Profession: Businessman

Yuriy Tymoshok (Ukrainian: Тимошок Юрій Миколайович; born 12 December 1963) is a Ukrainian businessman, politician and football president. Head of the Department of Alcohol Industry in Chernihiv region. Today he is the General Director of CJSC "Ftorpolimermash", at the same time he is the main observer. Member of the People's Party. President of Desna Chernihiv.

== Biography ==
Yuriy Tymoshok was born on 12 december 2021, in Kyiv but he spent his childhood in Liubech, Ripky Raion, because he has ancestral roots here. Many of his colleagues and friends, described him as a man of words and concrete deeds and ready to communicate with people, ready to help them solve urgent issues. Most importantly, he can hear those who turn to him. In 2007 he was candidate from the Lytvyn Bloc of parliamentary elections (№ 159 in the list). He works in the alcohol industry. Deputy Director of the concern, which includes the company "Chernihivspirtgorilka". Previously, he headed the Kholm Alcohol Plant in Chernihiv Oblast and the Sumispirt enterprise, Tymoshok was also the main supervisory board of the Chernihivspirtgorilka enterprise.

== Sport ==
In 2010 he become President of the football club Desna Chernihiv, the main club of the city of Chernihiv and the new Club formed for the 2010–11 season. In 2012 he state that he was a co-owner of Desna club is owned by a group of people who manage the company "BSM". It includes a group of companies engaged in consulting, the alcoholic beverage industry, construction, and charity. As coach for the club he appointed Oleksandr Deriberin and he managed to bring the club at the second place in Ukrainian Second League and gained the playoff of the Ukrainian Second League in the season 2011–12.

== See also ==
- FC Desna Chernihiv
