= Khimik Stadium =

The Khimik Stadium is a name of several sports facilities that during the times of Soviet Union belonged to the Khimik sports society. Itself Khimik means a chemist.

It may refer to:

== Russia ==
- Khimik Stadium (Dzerzhinsk), a stadium in Dzerzhinsk
- Khimik Stadium (Kemerovo), a stadium in Kemerovo
- Khimik Stadium, a stadium in Yaroslavl in 1957–1960, today Shinnik Stadium

== Ukraine ==
- Khimik Stadium, a stadium in Armyansk
- Khimik Sport Complex, a stadium in Chernihiv
- Khimik Stadium, a stadium in Kalush
- Khimik Stadium, a stadium in Krasnoperekopsk
- Khimik Stadium, a stadium in Pervomaiskyi
- Khimik Stadium, a stadium in Rivne
- Khimik Stadium, a stadium in Severodonetsk
- Khimik Stadium, a stadium in Slovyansk
