= 1970 KFK competitions (Ukraine) =

KFK competitions
- Season: 1970
- Champions: Sokil Lviv

The 1970 KFK competitions in Ukraine were part of the 1970 Soviet KFK competitions that were conducted in the Soviet Union. It was 7th season of the KFK in Ukraine since its introduction in 1964.

== First stage ==
=== Group 1 ===
- Kolos Buchach
- Sokil Lviv
- Khimik Kalush
- Kooperator Berehovo
- Tsementnyk Mykolaiv
- Voskhod Chernivtsi
- Enerhiya Khmelnytskyi
- Budivelnyk Khust

=== Group 2 ===
Pos	Team	Pld	W	D	L	GF	GA	GD	Pts
1	Khimik Chernihiv	14	10	4	0	32	6	+26	24
2	Avtomobilist Khmelnyk	14	7	4	3	12	16	−4	18
3	Torpedo Rivno	14	6	5	3	16	9	+7	17
4	Kozhevenchyk Berdychiv	14	7	3	4	17	11	+6	17
5	Vymiriuvach Zhytomyr	14	7	2	5	18	14	+4	16
6	Avtomobilist Bila Tserkva	14	4	3	7	16	17	−1	11
7	Avanhard Uman	14	1	3	10	9	26	−17	5
8	Mekhanizator Rozhyshche	14	1	2	11	7	28	−21	4

Source: ukr-football.org.ua

=== Group 3 ===
Pos	Team	Pld	W	D	L	GF	GA	GD	Pts
1	Avanhard Simferopil	14	12	0	2	29	12	+17	24
2	Koktebel Shchebetivka	14	7	1	6	18	4	+14	15
3	Metalist Sevastopol	14	7	1	6	12	12	0	15
4	Spartak Mykolaiv	14	5	4	5	7	9	−2	14
5	Lokomotyv Znamianka	14	6	2	6	6	16	−10	14
6	Budivelnyk Henichesk	14	6	1	7	5	16	−11	13
7	Komunarovets Mykolaiv	14	5	1	8	7	21	−14	11
8	Povstannia Tatarbunary	14	3	0	11	10	4	+6	6

Source: ukr-football.org.ua

=== Group 4 ===
Pos	Team	Pld	W	D	L	GF	GA	GD	Pts
1	Avanhard Ordzhonikidze	14	8	5	1	20	6	+14	21
2	Shakhtar Makiivka	14	7	6	1	24	4	+20	20
3	Metalurh Yenakieve	14	6	6	2	21	9	+12	18
4	Vahonobudivnyk Kremenchuk	14	6	4	4	21	14	+7	16
5	Khimik Shostka	14	4	4	6	12	23	−11	12
6	Sputnik Poltava	14	1	8	5	7	14	−7	10
7	Dzerzhynets Dzerzhynsk	14	2	4	8	15	32	−17	8
8	Donets Izyum	14	2	3	9	11	29	−18	7

Source: ukr-football.org.ua

=== Group 5 ===
Pos	Team	Pld	W	D	L	GF	GA	GD	Pts
1	Tsvetmet Artemivsk	16	10	4	2	27	9	+18	24
2	Mayak Kharkiv	16	10	4	2	27	14	+13	24
3	Shakhtar Lysychansk	16	7	6	3	25	12	+13	20
4	ZKL Dnipropetrovsk	16	7	2	7	21	16	+5	16
5	Sitall Kostiantynivka	16	5	6	5	20	19	+1	16
6	Tytan Zaporizhia	16	5	5	6	15	17	−2	15
7	Shakhtar Krasnodon	16	5	5	6	15	18	−3	15
8	Torpedo Melitopol	16	3	5	8	22	31	−9	11
9	Vuhlyk Kramatorsk	16	1	1	14	6	42	−36	3

Source: ukr-football.org.ua

== Final ==
Pos	Team	Pld	W	D	L	GF	GA	GD	Pts
1	Sokil Lviv	4	2	2	0	8	6	+2	6
2	Avanhard Ordzhonikidze	4	1	2	1	5	4	+1	4
3	Khimik Chernihiv	4	1	2	1	6	6	0	4
4	Tsvetmet Artemivsk	4	1	2	1	4	4	0	4
5	Avanhard Simferopol	4	1	0	3	5	8	−3	2

Source: ukr-football.org.ua

== Promotion ==
None of KFK teams were promoted to the 1971 Soviet Second League, Zone 1.

- none

However, to the Class B were promoted following teams that did not participate in the KFK competitions:

- none
