= 1975 KFK competitions (Ukraine) =

KFK competitions
- Season: 1975
- Champions: Kolos Nikopol

The 1975 KFK competitions in Ukraine were part of the 1975 Soviet KFK competitions that were conducted in the Soviet Union. It was 11th season of the KFK in Ukraine since its introduction in 1964.

== First stage ==
=== Group 1 ===
Pos	Team	Pld	W	D	L	GF	GA	GD	Pts
1	Sokil Lviv	12	9	0	3	24	14	+10	18
2	Elektron Ivano-Frankivsk	12	7	2	3	15	16	−1	16
3	Torpedo Rivne	12	5	3	4	15	14	+1	13
4	Dnister Zalishchyky	12	6	1	5	14	19	−5	13
5	Avanhard Vinnytsia	12	4	2	6	16	15	+1	10
6	Burevisnyk Ternopil	12	3	1	8	12	14	−2	7
7	Voskhod Chernivtsi	12	3	1	8	14	18	−4	7

Source: ukr-football.org.ua

=== Group 2 ===
Pos	Team	Pld	W	D	L	GF	GA	GD	Pts
1	Prylad Mukachevo	14	9	4	1	23	5	+18	22
2	SKA Lviv	14	7	1	6	16	13	+3	15
3	Kolos Khodoriv	14	6	2	6	22	18	+4	14
4	Silmash Kovel	14	6	2	6	15	22	−7	14
5	Sluch Krasyliv	14	5	3	6	15	17	−2	13
6	Elektrovymiriuvach Zhytomyr	14	5	3	6	18	22	−4	13
7	Refryzherator Fastiv	14	4	3	7	8	15	−7	11
8	Arsenal Kyiv	14	3	4	7	12	17	−5	10

Source: ukr-football.org.ua

=== Group 3 ===
Pos	Team	Pld	W	D	L	GF	GA	GD	Pts
1	Khimik Chernihiv	12	7	3	2	21	6	+15	17
2	Shakhtar Oleksandriya	12	5	5	2	19	13	+6	15
3	Radyst Kirovohrad	12	5	4	3	13	13	0	14
4	Lokomotyv Smila	12	3	7	2	15	16	−1	13
5	Bilshovyk Kyiv	12	4	4	4	11	14	−3	12
6	Khvylia Mykolaiv	12	4	3	5	12	13	−1	11
7	Fotoprylad Cherkasy	12	0	2	10	9	25	−16	2

Source: ukr-football.org.ua

=== Group 4 ===
Pos	Team	Pld	W	D	L	GF	GA	GD	Pts
1	Kolos Nikopol	14	13	1	0	32	4	+28	27
2	Portovyk Illichivsk	14	9	1	4	29	12	+17	19
3	Avanhard Simferopil	14	6	2	6	22	19	+3	14
4	Shtorm Odesa	14	6	2	6	19	19	0	14
5	Tytan Armyansk	14	4	4	6	23	26	−3	12
6	Enerhiya Nova Kakhovka	14	4	2	8	19	31	−12	10
7	Budivelnyk Henichesk	14	3	3	8	27	36	−9	9
8	Okean Mykolaiv	14	2	3	9	12	36	−24	7

Source: ukr-football.org.ua

=== Group 5 ===
Pos	Team	Pld	W	D	L	GF	GA	GD	Pts
1	Metalurh Kupiansk	12	7	5	0	21	5	+16	19
2	Vikhr Dnipropetrovsk	12	7	3	2	16	6	+10	17
3	Monolit Donetsk	12	6	4	2	24	7	+17	16
4	Promin Poltava	12	4	4	4	18	15	+3	12
5	Vohnetryvnyk Chasiv Yar	12	4	3	5	16	24	−8	11
6	Svema Shostka	12	1	5	6	8	28	−20	7
7	Hazovyk Shebelynky	12	1	0	11	6	27	−21	2
8	Komunar Zaporizhia	0	-	-	-	-	-	—	0

Source: ukr-football.org.ua

=== Group 6 ===
Pos	Team	Pld	W	D	L	GF	GA	GD	Pts
1	Shakhtar Kadiivka	14	7	7	0	29	13	+16	21
2	Hvardiets Odesa	14	7	5	2	19	15	+4	19
3	Bliuminh Kramatorsk	14	7	4	3	24	19	+5	18
4	Mashynobudivnyk Druzhkivka	14	7	3	4	17	13	+4	17
5	Strila Zaporizhia	14	7	3	4	13	16	−3	17
6	Azovets Berdiansk	14	3	5	6	13	20	−7	11
7	Khimik Rubizhne	14	2	5	7	16	26	−10	9
8	Spartak Kharkiv	14	2	0	12	9	18	−9	4

Source: ukr-football.org.ua

== Final ==
Pos	Team	Pld	W	D	L	GF	GA	GD	Pts	Promotion
1	Kolos Nikopol	5	3	2	0	9	2	+7	8	Promoted to Second League
2	Metalurh Kupyansk	5	3	1	1	5	4	+1	7	
3	Khimik Chernihiv	5	2	2	1	6	4	+2	6	
4	Prylad Mukacheve	5	1	2	2	7	7	0	4	
5	Sokil Lviv	5	1	1	3	2	6	−4	3	
6	Shakhtar Kadiivka	5	0	2	3	4	10	−6	2	

Source: ukr-football.org.ua
