= Andriy Protsko =

Soviet footballer and coach (born 1947)

Personal information
- Full name: Andriy Andriyovych Protsko
- Date of birth: 14 October 1947 (age 79)
- Place of birth: Chernihiv, Ukrainian SSR, Soviet Union
- Position: Forward

Youth career
- Sports school Chernihiv
- SDYuShOR Desna

Senior career*
Years	Team	Apps	(Gls)
1965	Spartak Chernihiv	0	(0)
1966–1970	Desna Chernihiv	191	(30)
1971–1972	FC Dynamo Khmelnytskyi	?	(2)
1973	Khimik Chernihiv		
1974	Kolos Poltava	17	(1)
1975–1976	Khimik Chernihiv		
1977–1980	Desna Chernihiv	127	(27)

Managerial career
- 1981–1982: Desna Chernihiv (ass't)
- 1983: Desna Chernihiv
- 1984–1986: Desna Chernihiv (ass't)
- 1987: Desna Chernihiv
- 1989: Desna Chernihiv
- 1990–1993: Desna Chernihiv (ass't)
- 2001–2002: Desna Chernihiv (ass't)
- * Club domestic league appearances and goals

Andriy Protsko (Ukrainian: Андрій Андрійович Процко; born 14 October 1947) is a former professional Soviet football forward and coach.

== Career ==
He started his career for FC Desna Chernihiv in 1966– until 1970. In 1971 he moved to FC Dynamo Khmelnytskyi until 1972. The following year he moved to FC Khimik Chernihiv, where he won Ukrainian Amateur Football Championship in 1976, the Chernihiv Oblast Football Championship in 1973, 1975, 1976. He also won the Chernihiv Oblast Football Cup 1975. FC Kolos Poltava, FC Khimik Chernihiv. In 1977 he returned to FC Desna Chernihiv until 1980.

== Honours ==
=== As Player ===
Khimik Chernihiv

- Ukrainian Amateur Football Championship: 1976
- Chernihiv Oblast Football Championship 1973, 1975, 1976
- Chernihiv Oblast Football Cup 1975

Desna Chernihiv

- Football Championship of the Ukrainian SSR: 1968
