= Yuriy Ovcharov =

Soviet footballer and Ukrainian coach

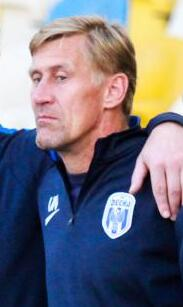

Personal information
- Full name: Ovcharov Yuriy Mykolayovych
- Date of birth: 19 March 1966 (age 60)
- Place of birth: Kirovsk, Ukrainian SSR, USSR
- Height: 1.84 m (6 ft 0 in)
- Position: Goalkeeper

Senior career*
Years	Team	Apps	(Gls)
1984–1988	Desna Chernihiv	72	(0)
1988–1990	Kosonsoy	50	(0)
1991–1993	Desna Chernihiv	51	(0)
1993–1995	Zirka Kropyvnytskyi	46	(0)
1995–1996	Stal Alchevsk	18	(0)
1996–1997	Zirka Kropyvnytskyi	5	(0)
1997–1999	Desna Chernihiv	72	(0)
1999–2000	Polissya Zhytomyr	11	(0)
2001–2003	Desna Chernihiv	3	(0)

Managerial career
- 2003–2010: Desna Chernihiv (goalkeeping coach)
- 2009: Desna Chernihiv (caretaker)
- 2010–2011: Lviv (goalkeeping coach)
- 2011: Bukovyna (goalkeeping coach)
- 2012–2022: Desna Chernihiv (goalkeeping coach)
- 2022–2024: Kudrivka (goalkeeping coach)
- * Club domestic league appearances and goals

Yuriy Ovcharov (Ukrainian: Ovcharov Yuriy Mykolayovych; born 19 March 1966) is a retired Soviet and Ukrainian football player.

== Playing career ==
A pupil of Luhansk football. From 1984 to 1988 he played for Desna Chernihiv in the Ukrainian Second League. In 1989 he moved to Kosonsoy, where he became a silver medalist of the second league in 1990 (zone 9). In 1991 he returned to Desna Chernihiv. The first match in the championship of Ukraine was played on 3 May 1992 in the 13th round of the Ukrainian First League against Sumy "Motorist" (2–1 loss). In the fall of 1993 he played for Polissya Zhytomyr.

In 1994 he became a player of Stal Alchevsk. For two seasons as a member of the Kirovograd team he won a bronze medal of the Ukrainian Second League (1993–94) and a gold medal of the first league (1994–95). He spent the 1995–96 season at Alchevsk Steel, which took third place in the Ukrainian First League. In 1996 he returned to Zirka Kropyvnytskyi. He made his debut in the major leagues on 15 September 1996 in a match against Dnipro (4–0 loss).

In 1997 he returned to Chernihiv. In 14 games of the 1996–97 championship, in which Desna Chernihiv took first place in Group "A" of the Ukrainian Second League, missed 1 goal. In 1999 he played for Polissya Zhytomyr, in 2002–2003 he was a player for Desna.

== Coaching career ==
After the end of the player's career in 2003, he got a position in the coaching staff of Desna Chernihiv. In 2008 he was included in the team's application for the position of goalkeeper. In the summer of 2009, during 6 rounds of the Ukrainian championship, he acted as head coach due to the fact that Desna Chernihiv did not sign a contract with Oleksandr Ryabokon. According to the results of the 2009–10 season, "Desna" took 8th place in the Ukrainian First League, but was excluded from the PFL. Yuriy Ovcharov together with head coach Oleksandr Ryabokon transferred to Lviv. From 2011 he worked as a coach of Bukovyna goalkeepers. In the summer of 2012 he returned to Desna Chernihiv.

== Honours ==
Zirka Kropyvnytskyi

- Ukrainian Second League: 1993–94
