= Yukhym Shkolnykov =

Ukrainian footballer (1939–2009)

Personal information
- Full name: Yukhym Hryhorovych Shkolnykov
- Date of birth: 31 January 1939
- Place of birth: Chernihiv, Ukrainian SSR, Soviet Union (now Ukraine)
- Date of death: 3 September 2009 (aged 70)
- Place of death: Woodbridge Township, New Jersey
- Position: Forward

Senior career*
Years	Team	Apps	(Gls)
1960	Avanhard Chernihiv	2	(0)
1961–1963	Zirka Chernihiv		
1963–1968	Desna Chernihiv	86	(50)
1969–1971	Khimik Chernihiv		

International career
1965	Ukraine		(8)

Managerial career
- 1969–1971: Khimik Chernihiv (player-coach)
- 1974: SC Chernihiv
- 1976: Khimik Chernihiv
- 1977–1982: Desna Chernihiv
- 1983–1986: Nyva Vinnytsia
- 1987–1992: Bukovyna Chernivtsi
- 1992–1994: Nyva Vinnytsia
- 1994: CS Tiligul-Tiras Tiraspol
- 1995–1996: Bukovyna Chernivtsi
- 1996–1999: Desna Chernihiv
- 2001: Polissya Zhytomyr
- 2004: Polissya Zhytomyr
- 2007: Desna Chernihiv (team's chief)
- * Club domestic league appearances and goals

Yukhym Hryhorovych Shkolnykov (Note: Ukrainian: Юхим Григорович Школьников, romanized: Yukhym Hryhorovych Shkolnykov) (31 January 1939 – 3 September 2009) was a Ukrainian coach and Soviet footballer. He was on the original squad of Avanhard Chernihiv, that in 1960 joined the Class B competitions.

== Playing career ==
Since 1960 he played for the Chernihiv's Desna (Avanhard at first). In 1965, when he was touring with the Ukraine football national team India, Burma and Thailand (scored 8 goals), he received an invitation from Nikolai Starostin to move to Muscovite "Spartak", but decided to stay in his Chernihiv team.

In 1963 after his return from Zirka Chernihiv, Shkolnikov became a fan's favorite whom the Chernihiv's fans called "Fima, davai" (Fima, let's go).

In 1976 as a coach of amateur Khimik Chernihiv he won the Chernihiv Oblast Football Championship in 1976. The year later, in 1977, Desna Chernihiv was reestablished.

== Coaching career ==
At the end of his playing career he coached the amateur team Khimik Chernihiv, which under his leadership became the Champion of Ukrainian Amateur Football Championship in 1976. In 1977, on the basis of "Chemist" was revived "Desna", in 1982 took second place in the Ukrainian zone of the Second League of the USSR. With Vinnytsia's Niva (1983–1986) he won medals in the Second All-Union League for three consecutive seasons.

In 1987–1992 he headed Bukovyna Chernivtsi in 1988 got the first place and in 1989 got second. The team entered won the Soviet Second League in 1990 and was promoted to First League of the USSR and the following season took 5th place. In 1991, after the collapse of the Soviet Union, he was one of the candidates for the position of head coach of the national team of Ukraine.

== Honours ==
=== As player ===
Khimik Chernihiv

- Chernihiv Oblast Football Championship 1969, 1970, 1971

Desna Chernihiv

- Football Championship of the Ukrainian SSR: 1968

FC Zirka Chernihiv

- Chernihiv Oblast Football Championship 1962

=== As coach ===
Desna Chernihiv

- Ukrainian Second League: 1996–97

Bukovyna Chernivtsi

- Football Championship of the Ukrainian SSR: 1988
- Soviet Vtoraya Liga: 1990

Nyva Vinnytsia

- Ukrainian First League: 1992–93
- Championship of the Ukrainian SSR: 1984

Khimik Chernihiv

- Chernihiv Oblast Football Championship 1976
