= Mykhaylo Dunets =

Ukrainian football manager (born 1950)

Personal information
- Full name: Mykhaylo Mykhaylovych Dunets
- Date of birth: 3 November 1950 (age 75)
- Place of birth: Proskuriv, Ukrainian SSR
- Position: Defender

Youth career
- Dynamo Khmelnytskyi

Senior career*
Years	Team	Apps	(Gls)
1967	Dynamo Khmelnytskyi	0	(0)
1968–1969	Sluch Krasyliv		
1970–1971	Temp Orsha		
1972–1973	Dvina Vitebsk	63	(0)
1974	Baltika Kaliningrad	7	(0)
1975	Trud Shevchenko		
1976	Spartak Semipalatinsk		

Managerial career
- 1978: Podillya Khmelnytskyi (assistant)
- 1979–1981: Nyva Pidhaitsi
- 1981: Podillya Khmelnytskyi
- 1982: Kolos Pavlohrad
- 1983–1986: Nyva Ternopil
- 1988–1989: Desna Chernihiv
- 1989–1990: Zaria Bălţi
- 1991: Nyva Ternopil
- 1992: Kryvbas Kryvyi Rih (assistant)
- 1993–1994: Veres Rivne
- 1994: Podillya Khmelnytskyi
- 1998: Chornomorets Odesa (assistant)
- 1999: Polissya Zhytomyr
- Örnsköldsvik
- Kramfors
- 2003: Karpaty-2 Lviv
- 2004–2005: Junsele
- 2006: Friska Viljor
- 2007: Olimpia Bălţi
- 2007: Junsele
- 2007–2008: Krymteplytsia Molodizhne
- 2008: Komunalnyk Luhansk
- 2009: Desna Chernihiv
- 2011: Dynamo Khmelnytskyi
- 2012–2014: Nyva Ternopil (assistant)
- 2014–2015: Inhulets Petrove (sporting director)
- * Club domestic league appearances and goals

Mykhaylo Mykhaylovych Dunets (Ukrainian: Михайло Михайлович Дунець; born 3 November 1950) is a Soviet and Ukrainian former football player and coach.
