= Khimik Sport Complex =

Multi-purpose stadium in Chernihiv, Ukraine

Khimik Sports Complex
- Interactive map of Khimik Sports Complex
- Location: Ivana Mazepy St, 78, Chernihiv, Chernihiv Oblast, Ukraine, 16624
- Coordinates: 51°28′12″N 31°14′46″E
- Surface: Grass
- Field size: 105x68

Tenants
- FC Chernihiv; Lehenda Chernihiv; Desna-2 Chernihiv; Desna-3 Chernihiv; SDYuShOR Desna; Yunist Nika; Khimik Chernihiv (Defunct)

Khimik Sports Complex (Ukrainian: Химик, Спорткомплекс) is located in Ivana Mazepy St, 78, Chernihiv, Chernihiv Oblast, Ukraine 14039.

== General description ==
The Khimik Sport Complex is located nearby the Tekstylnyk stadium on an area of 4.5 hectares. In the past was the home arena of football club Khimik Chernihiv, located also by 2–3 km from the Chernihiv Ovruch railway and the Monument to Soldiers Liberators in Victory Square. There are football fields, tennis courts; there are also large and small gyms in the room, a big gym. 4 changing rooms with toilets and showers; wood-fired sauna. The Complex offers services of sports facilities for cultural events. There are high-class table tennis and tennis sparring coaches, that can helps anyone interested in improving their skills. Football fans can rent any of the three fields of different sizes or a gym. After a good workout there is an opportunity to take a steam bath in a cozy sauna.

== History ==
=== Origin ===
The football field was the home venue of the defunt football team Khimik Chernihiv football club, which won the Ukrainian Amateur Football Championship in 1976. It won the Chernihiv Oblast Football Championship 15 times and the Chernihiv Oblast Football Cup 10 times.

On 14 August 2013, the final of the Chernihiv Oblast Supercup was played on the football field between the local team FC Chernihiv and Avanhard Koriukivka.

On 10 October 2017, the Ukrainian Cadet Championship was held at the Khimik Sport Complex. This championship is one of the selection criteria for the Ukrainian national team, which participates in all international competitions. The Ukrainian championship was held for boys and girls born in 2003 and during the successful years.

On February 2 and 3, 2019, the Khimik Sport Complex hosted the WAKO Ukrainian Kickboxing Championship for Students and Youth. Approximately seven hundred athletes from nineteen regions of Ukraine, along with one hundred and seventeen judges, arrived in Chernihiv.

In September 2020, the facility hosted the Ukrainian Table Tennis Championship for Athletes with Hearing Impairment (men and women). Competitions were held in individual, doubles, and team categories. Fourteen female and twenty-two male athletes from various regions of Ukraine competed for the prizes.

From September 28 to October 7, the national training camp for the youth (born in 2003) and cadet (born in 2006) national teams was held at the Khimik sports complex.

The football venue was used also by the female football club Lehenda Chernihiv, the young team academy of SDYuShOR Desna, Desna-3 Chernihiv and Desna-2 Chernihiv. In summer 2021, FC Chernihiv, used the venue for the training for the next season (2021-22) of Ukrainian Second League.

=== Damaged ===
The complex suffered during the battles for Chernihiv in February–April 2022. The sports complex was targeted, but the rocket missed the building, leaving a crater on the adjacent sports field instead. The crater is approximately ten meters deep. The "Chemistry" hall suffered severe damage, with all windows broken, plaster crumbling, tables, floors, ceilings, and electrical wiring damaged. The table tennis center was rendered virtually unusable. The Khimik-Chernihiv Sports Complex came under artillery fire several times during the fighting. More than ten shells fell on the territory of the complex, one of which formed a ten-meter funnel on the football field. The shells hit the Khimik sports hall, where a number of national tournaments were held before the Russian attack, both at the youth and adult levels. The open-air tennis court, which was hit by several mines, was also damaged. According to the employees of the sports complex, looting occurred during the siege of Chernihiv, as eight TV sets disappeared from the building.

=== 2023 ===
In 2023, the complex hosted the Ukrainian Table Tennis Championship for the first time since the large-scale invasion. Also in 2023, the management of FC Chernihiv contributed to the restoration of the football field, as after the destruction of the Chernihiv Arena, they were looking for a place to train.

== Important matches ==
=== Chernihiv Oblast Super Cup (final) ===
Date	Team #1	Result	Team #2	Round	Attendance	Source
14 August 2013	(Ukraine) USB Chernihiv	1–0	(Ukraine) Avanhard Koriukivka	2013		

== Gallery ==
View of the Sports Hall

View of the Sports Hall

View of the Football Pitch

View of the Tennis Court

== See also ==
- List of sports venues in Chernihiv
- Khimik Chernihiv
- FC Chernihiv
