= Yevgeny Goryansky =

Russian footballer

Personal information
- Full name: Yevgeny Ivanovich Goryansky
- Date of birth: 28 February 1929
- Place of birth: Moscow, Russian SFSR
- Date of death: 13 July 1999 (aged 70)
- Place of death: Moscow, Russia
- Height: 1.74 m (5 ft 8 1/2 in)
- Positions: Forward; midfielder

Youth career
- FC Dynamo Moscow

Senior career*
Years	Team	Apps	(Gls)
1948	FC Dynamo-Klubnaya Moscow		
1949–1952	ODO Lviv		
1953–1956	FC Lokomotiv Moscow	33	(8)

Managerial career
- 1958–1960: Zvezda Kirovograd
- 1961: Sudnobudivnyk Mykolaiv
- 1962: FC Desna Chernihiv
- 1963: FC Karpaty Lviv (team director)
- 1963: FC Dynamo Kyiv (assistant)
- 1966: FC Zorya Luhansk
- 1968: FC Lokomotiv Moscow (team director)
- 1968–1969: Soviet Union (assistant)
- 1970–1972: FC Zenit Leningrad
- 1973: Soviet Union
- 1974–1976: FC Dinamo Minsk
- 1978: FC Dynamo Makhachkala
- 1980: FC Dynamo Moscow
- 1983–1984: FC Desna Chernihiv
- 1986–1988: FC Lokomotiv Moscow (academy)
- 1992: FC Oka (assistant)
- * Club domestic league appearances and goals

Yevgeny Ivanovich Goryansky (Russian: Евгений Иванович Горянский; 28 February 1929 – 13 July 1999) was a Russian football striker and football coach.

== Career ==
In 1945, he began his career in junior football for Dynamo Moscow. Then for three years he served in the military club OBO Lviv. After demobilization, he returned to Moscow, where he was player of Lokomotiv Moscow. In 1956, as a result of severe injuries he was forced to end his playing career and began an illustrious coaching career.

In 1960, he graduated from the Pedagogical Institute in Luhansk. From 1958, he coached the Ukrainian clubs Zirka Kirovohrad, Sudnobudivelnyk Mykolaiv and Desna Chernihiv. In 1963, he worked as a manager of the club Karpaty Lviv, and later helped train Dynamo Kiev. In the years 1966-1967 he led the club FC Zorya Luhansk, then became director of Lokomotiv Moscow. From September 1968 to May 1969 he worked on the staff training team of the USSR, and later became Assistant Director of the Football Association Sports Committee of the USSR, where he worked until June 1970. After managing Zenit Leningrad in 1973, he was the Soviet national team coach. He then ran Dinamo Minsk, Dinamo Makhachkala and Dynamo Moscow. In the years 1980-1983 he re-trained, and from 1986 to 1988 he worked as a coach at the School of Sports of Lokomotiv Moscow. He died on July 13, 1999, in Moscow.

Goryansky was champion of the First League of the Soviet Union in 1975 with Dinamo Minsk. He won the title of Master of Sports of the USSR in 1967, title of Merited Coach of the Ukrainian SSR in 1963, the title of Merited Coach of the Russian SFSR in 1973 and the title of Merited Coach of the Byelorussian SSR in 1975.
