= Yevhen Lemeshko =

Ukrainian football coach (1930–2016)

Personal information
- Full name: Yevhen Pylypovych Lemeshko
- Date of birth: 11 December 1930
- Place of birth: Mykolaiv, Ukrainian SSR
- Date of death: 2 June 2016 (aged 85)
- Place of death: Kyiv, Ukraine
- Height: 1.82 m (6 ft 0 in)
- Position: Goalkeeper

Senior career*
Years	Team	Apps	(Gls)
1949	Sudnobudivnyk Mykolaiv		
1950	Lokomotyv Kharkiv		
1950–1958	Dynamo Kyiv		
1959	Sudnobudivnyk Mykolaiv		
1959–1960	Shakhtar Stalino		

International career
1956	Ukraine	2	(0)

Managerial career
- 1960–1966: FC Dynamo Khmelnytskyi
- 1967: Karpaty Lviv
- 1968–1970: FC Dynamo Khmelnytskyi
- 1971–1974: FC Sudobudivnyk Mykolaiv
- 1977–1988: Metalist Kharkiv
- 1989–1993: FC Torpedo Zaporizhia
- 1993: Metalist Kharkiv
- * Club domestic league appearances and goals

Yevhen Lemeshko (Ukrainian: Євген Пилипович Лемешко; 11 December 1930 – 2 June 2016) was a Ukrainian football player and coach as well as chairman of the Council of Veteran Footballers.

== Club career ==
Lemeshko started his football career as a player for FC Dynamo Kyiv, but due to an injury he continued his football career as a coach.

== International career ==
In 1956 Lemeshko played couple of games for Ukraine at the Spartakiad of the Peoples of the USSR.

== Coaching career ==
In 1980, Lemeshko became a Merited Coach of Ukraine.

Team	Nat	From	To	Record				
Team	Nat	From	To	G	W	D	L	Win %
Podillia	(Soviet Union)	1961	1965	199	77	51	71	38.7
Karpaty	(Soviet Union)	July 1966	August 1967	47	19	11	17	40.4
Desna	(Soviet Union)	August 1967	December 1967	11	6	3	2	54.5
Podillia	(Soviet Union)	1968	1970	136	55	42	39	40.4
MFC Mykolaiv	(Soviet Union)	1971	1974	189	101	47	41	53.4
Krystal	(Soviet Union)	March 1976	December 1976	38	14	15	9	36.8
Metalist	(Soviet Union)	January 1977	December 1988	521	227	136	158	43.6
Torpedo Zap	(Soviet Union) (Ukraine)	June 1989	23 April 1993	175	78	41	56	44.6
Podillia	(Ukraine)	1 May 1993	30 June 1993	12	5	3	4	41.7
Metalist	(Ukraine)	1 August 1993	December 1993	19	4	5	10	21.1
Total				1,347	586	354	407	43.5

== Death ==
Lemeshko died on 2 June 2016 at the age of 85.

== Personal information ==
Lemeshko was a father-in-law of Oleh Protasov.

== Honors ==
=== Coach ===
Sudnobudivnyk

- Champion of Ukraine: 1974

Metalist Kharkiv

- Champion of Ukraine: 1978
- Champion USSR: 1981
- USSR Cup: 1983, 1988

Torpedo Zaporizhia

- Champion of Ukraine: 1990

== See also ==
- List of football managers with the most matches
