= Serhiy Kucherenko (footballer, born 1961) =

Ukrainian football player and coach

Serhiy Petrovich Kucherenko
Personal information
- Full name: Serhiy Petrovich Kucherenko
- Date of birth: 22 August 1961 (age 65)
- Place of birth: Odesa, Ukrainian SSR, Soviet Union
- Position: Defender

Youth career
- Chornomorets Odesa

Senior career*
Years	Team	Apps	(Gls)
1980	Podillya Khmelnytskyi	5	(0)
1982–1985	Zirka Kirovohrad	110	(1)
1985–1987	Spartak Ryazan	56	(1)
1989	Dynamo Odesa	0	(0)
1991	Zirka Kirovohrad	40	(0)

Managerial career
- 2003: Yunist Chornomorets Odesa
- 2005–2006: Podillya Khmelnytskyi
- 2007: Spartak Ivano-Frankivsk
- 2007–2008: Desna Chernihiv
- 2009: FSh "Nasaf" Karshi
- * Club domestic league appearances and goals

Serhiy Petrovich Kucherenko (Russian: Кучеренко Сергей Петрович; born 22 August 1961) is a Ukrainian football coach and former player.

== Managerial career ==
In 2005, Kucherenko was appointed head coach of Podillya Khmelnytskyi. In 2007, he became head coach of Spartak Ivano-Frankivsk. From 2007 to 2008, Kucherenko was coach of Desna Chernihiv. In 2009, he was head coach of Uzbek Mash'al club.

== Personal life ==
Kucherenko's son Serhiy was also a Desna Chernihiv football player.
