= FC Khimik Chernihiv =

Ukrainian football club

- Full name: ФК «Хімік» Чернігів
- Founded: 1950s
- Dissolved: 1993
- Ground: Khimik Sports Complex, Ivana Mazepy St, 78, Chernihiv, Chernihiv Oblast, Ukraine
- League: Chernihiv Oblast Football Championship

FC Khimik Chernihiv (Ukrainian: ФК «Хімік» Чернігів) was a Ukrainian football "Khimik" Chernihiv. A Ukrainian and Soviet amateur club, the club played in the Championship and Cup of Chernihiv region and the Championship of the USSR among CPK. The club played at a stadium of the same name.

== History ==
Khimik was established sometime in 1950s in Chernihiv as a factory team of chemical factory "Khimvolokno" during the Soviet period (Ukrainian SSR) and it remains the team with a record number of the most Chernihiv Oblast Football Championship titles.

The team got third in Ukrainian Amateur Football Championship in 1970 in 1975. In 1976, the team won the Ukrainian Amateur Football Championship and produced players like Yuriy Hruznov, Andriy Protsko, Ihor Bobovych, Yukhym Shkolnykov and Viktor Danilevsky.

In 1977 was taken its roots in order to revived Desna Chernihiv the main team in Chernihiv. Anyway, the team won the Chernihiv Oblast Football Championship in 1985, 1986,1987, 1991 and 1993, The team won also the Chernihiv Oblast Football Cup in 1985 and 1988.

== Facilities & Venue ==
The team played in Khimik Sports Complex, Chernihiv, next to the Cheksil factory 2–3 km by the Chernihiv Ovruch railway and the Monument to Soldiers Liberators in Victory Square.

== Honours ==
Ukrainian Amateur Football Championship

- Winners (1): 1976
- Third place (2):, 1970, 1975

Chernihiv Oblast Football Championship

- Winners (15): 1967, 1968, 1969, 1970, 1971, 1972, 1973, 1974, 1975, 1976, 1985, 1986, 1987, 1991, 1993

Chernihiv Oblast Football Cup

- Winners (10): 1966, 1967, 1968, 1969, 1970, 1974, 1975, 1985, 1988

== Notable players ==
- (Soviet Union) Yuriy Hruznov
- (Soviet Union) Andriy Protsko
- (Soviet Union) Yukhym Shkolnykov
- (Ukraine) Ihor Bobovych
- (Soviet Union) Victor Lazarenko
- (Soviet Union) Mikhail Chabaida
- (Soviet Union) Oleh Ivashchenko
- (Soviet Union) Viktor Danilevsky

== See also ==
- List of sport teams in Chernihiv
- FC Desna Chernihiv
- FC Desna-2 Chernihiv
- FC Desna-3 Chernihiv
- SDYuShOR Desna
- Yunist Chernihiv
- Yunist ShVSM
- Lehenda Chernihiv
