= FC Temp Orsha =

Temp Orsha
- Full name: Football Club Temp Orsha
- Founded: 1960
- Dissolved: 1991
- Ground: Central Sport Complex

FC Temp Orsha was a football club based in Baran, Vitebsk Oblast.

== History ==
The team was founded in 1960 as Temp Baran. Since its foundation and until the dissolution of Soviet Union the team was playing in Belarusian SSR league or Vitebsk Oblast league. Despite officially representing the town of Baran (located 9 km southwest from Orsha), its name was often rendered as Temp Orsha in match programmes or media.

Temp Orsha finished third in Belarusian SSR league in 1978 and reached the final of Belarusian SSR Cup twice (in 1975 and 1987). The club was folded after 1991 season.
