= Oleksandr Ryabokon =

Ukrainian footballer & manager (born 1964)

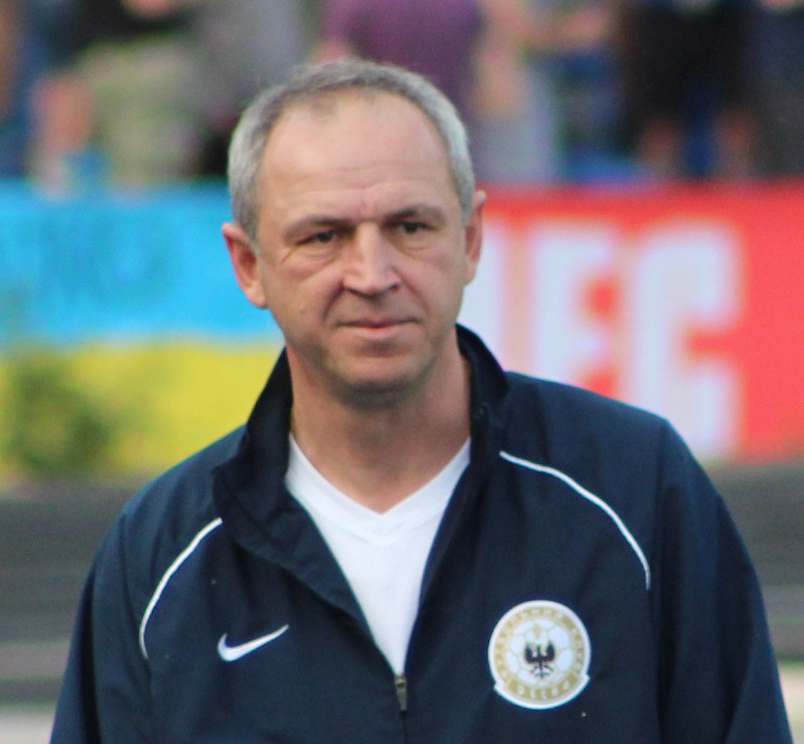

Personal information
- Full name: Oleksandr Dmytrovych Ryabokon
- Date of birth: 21 February 1964 (age 62)
- Place of birth: Kyiv, Ukrainian SSR, Soviet Union
- Height: 1.85 m (6 ft 1 in)
- Position: Defender

Team information
- Current team: Livyi Bereh Kyiv

Youth career
- Dynamo Kyiv

Senior career*
Years	Team	Apps	(Gls)
1982	Desna Chernihiv	6	(0)
1983	SKA Kyiv		
1984	Dnipro Cherkasy	16	(0)
1985	Zirka Kirovohrad	31	(0)
1987	Vorskla Poltava	44	(1)
1988	Gomselmash Gomel	8	(0)
1988–1989	Spartak Anapa	24	(6)
1990	Lori Kirovakan	37	(0)
1991	Zirka Kirovohrad	43	(5)
1992	Dnipro Cherkasy	22	(1)
1992	Meliorator Kakhovka	4	(1)
1993–1994	Sirius Kryvyi Rih	43	(9)
1995	Torpedo Mogilev	12	(0)
1995	Systema-Boreks Borodianka	2	(0)
1995	Torpedo Mogilev	8	(1)
1996–1997	Nerafa Slavutych	30	(4)
1997	Shanghai Pudong		
1998	Veres Rivne	16	(1)

Managerial career
- 1998–1999: Borysfen Boryspil (assistant)
- 1999–2000: Prykarpattia Ivano-Frankivsk (assistant)
- 2000–2001: Borysfen Boryspil
- 2001–2002: Ukraine U19
- 2002–2004: Borysfen Boryspil
- 2005: Obolon Kyiv
- 2005–2006: Dinamo Minsk
- 2006: Borysfen Boryspil
- 2007–2008: Dnipro Cherkasy
- 2008–2009: Desna Chernihiv
- 2009–2010: Desna Chernihiv
- 2010–2011: Lviv
- 2011: Sevastopol
- 2012–2022: Desna Chernihiv
- 2024: Dinaz Vyshhorod
- 2025: Lisne
- 2025–: Livyi Bereh Kyiv
- * Club domestic league appearances and goals

Oleksandr Ryabokon (Ukrainian: Олександр Дмитрович Рябоконь; born 21 February 1964) is a former Ukrainian football defender, and recently, until 2022, the head-coach of FC Desna Chernihiv in the Ukrainian Premier League. He is known for transforming a third tier team into a solid top-flight participant. He is also a combat veteran of the Russo-Ukrainian War.

== Career ==
=== Footballer ===
A product of the Dynamo Kyiv football academy (specialized sports school of Olympic reserve), Ryabokon started his professional career in FC Desna Chernihiv in 1982. During the Soviet period he changed clubs every season playing mostly at the Soviet third tier. In late 1980s he managed to play for some Caucasus region clubs from Circassian Anapa and Armenian Vanadzor. Following dissolution of the Soviet Union, he soon gained squad stability playing for Sirius Zhovti Vody, a former Soviet third tier team, after which he finally signed up with a top-flight club from Belarus, FC Torpedo Mogilev. After a season in Belarus, Ryabokon returned to Ukraine where he continued to play at the third tier switching clubs every season.

=== Coach ===
After he retired from playing football, he was invited to work as an assistant coach in 1998. In 2000, Ryabokon became the head coach of the FC Borysfen Boryspil and two years later got the team promoted to the Ukrainian Premier League. At the end of June 2010, Ryabokon became the new head coach of FC Lviv in the Ukrainian First League.

=== Desna Chernihiv ===
In 2012 he signed for Desna Chernihiv. he managed to promoted the team in Ukrainian First League after a great season 2012–13 of the Ukrainian Second League. In the season 2016–17 he has been elected Best Coach in the round 21, Round 23, Round 25, Round 29 and at the end of the season he has been elected even the best coach of the Ukrainian First League in the season 2016–17 and he next season with the club of Chernihiv won the Ukrainian First League in the season 2017–18.

In the season 2018–19 season he led the team to stay in Ukrainian Premier League without been relegated and he was elected Best Coach in Round 2, Round 6, Round 13 and Round 24.

In the 2019–20 season of the Ukrainian Premier League has been elected Best Coach in September 2019, in March 2020 and in June 2020.

He managed to bring the club at the 4th place in Ukrainian Premier League in the 2019–20 season and to qualify for the Europa League third qualifying round, for the first time in the history of the Club since 1960. Oleksandr Ryabokon won the Best Coach, 9 times in the 2019–20 season being the most winning coach in 32 rounds.

In the 2020-21 season of the Ukrainian Premier League was elected Best Coach of the round 1.

On 24 September 2020 Ryabokon was the coach that provided line up of the team of Desna Chernihiv against VfL Wolfsburg for the Europa League third qualifying round at the AOK Stadion.

On 9 March 2021 he has been elected Best Coach of the Round 17 of the Ukrainian Premier League in the 2020-21 season. On 12 April 2021 he was elected coach of the Round 21 in the season 2020-21 of Ukrainian Premier League

After the 2020-21 season, the club failed to qualify for the cups and Oleksandr Ryabokon with president of the club Volodymyr Levin let some players leave the club and adding new ones also with experience like Yevhen Selin who played in the Ukraine national football team. They worked also to rejuvenate the team, develop the academy in Chernihiv adding some players from Desna 3 Chernihiv and Desna 2 Chernihiv like Yevheniy Belych. In december 2021, the Desna Chernihiv's president Volodymyr Levin defined Ryabokon one of the best UPL of Ukrainian Premier League.

In 2022 due to the Russian full-scale invasion, Ryabokon soon after his birthday signed up for the Ukrainian Territorial Defense Forces in Chernihiv Oblast and participated in liberation of the region from the Russian occupational forces that were forced to flee.

== Honours ==
=== Player ===
Torpedo Mogilev

- Belarusian Cup runners-up: 1995

=== Coach ===
- Ukrainian First League: 2017–18
- Ukrainian Second League: 2012–13
- Ukrainian First League: 2002–03
- Belarusian Premier League Runner-up: 2005
- Ukrainian First League Runner-up: 2002–03

=== Individual ===
- Ukrainian First League Best Coach: 2016–17
