= Viktor Dubino =

Soviet footballer and Ukrainian coach

Personal information
- Full name: Дубино Виктор Прокофьевич
- Date of birth: 21 April 1946 (age 80)
- Place of birth: Ukrainian SSR, USSR
- Height: 1.84 m (6 ft 0 in)
- Position: Goalkeeper

Senior career*
Years	Team	Apps	(Gls)
1965	Nyva Vinnytsia	0	(0)
1966	Shakhtar Donetsk	0	(0)
1966–1967	Shakhtar Yenakiyevo	16	(0)
1970	Karpaty Mukacheve	0	(0)
1971–1974	Hoverla Uzhhorod	30	(2)

Managerial career
- 1991: Dnipro Cherkasy
- 1992: Hoverla Uzhhorod
- 1993: Ros Bila Tserkva
- 1994: Desna Chernihiv
- 2018–: Krystal Chortkiv
- * Club domestic league appearances and goals as of 2 January 2022

Viktor Dubino (Ukrainian: Дубино Виктор Прокофьевич) is a Ukrainian retired footballer.

== Playing career ==
A pupil of Smolensk SKA, the first coach - V. Belokon. In 1965 he began his football career as a member of the reserve team of Nyva Vinnytsia. The following year he moved to Shakhtar Donetsk, but even here he played exclusively for the reserve squad. In the summer of 1966 he went to Shakhtar Yenakiyevo. In the summer of 1969 he moved to the Karpaty Mukacheve. In the summer of 1970 he became a player of Hoverla Uzhhorod, as part of which he ended his career as a player in 1972. After a long break, in 1991 he returned to the football field, playing one match as part of the Dnipro Cherkasy.

== Coaching career ==
At the end of his career, the player began coaching. In 1991 he worked as the technical director of Dnipro Cherkasy. In 1993, until August, he headed Ros Bila Tserkva. After the end of his career as a football player, he started working as a coach. In 1991 практика на the post of technical director of Dnipro Cherkasy. In 1993, until August, he was in charge of Ros Bila Tserkva . In early 1994 he was appointed head coach of Desna Chernihiv", which he headed until August 1994. On April 17, 2018, he headed the amateur team Krystal Chortkiv.
