= Valentin Tugarin =

Soviet football manager

Personal information
- Full name: Valentin Yakovlevich Tugarin
- Date of birth: 5 May 1931
- Place of birth: USSR
- Date of death: 1998 (aged 66–67)

Managerial career
- Years: Team
- 1963–1964: SKCF Sevastopol
- 1965: FC Desna Chernihiv
- 1970: Avanhard Sevastopol (director)
- 1977: Avanhard Rivne
- 1980: Spartak Ivano-Frankivsk
- 1981–1982: Kryvbas Kryvyi Rih
- 1983–1986: Atlantyka Sevastopol
- 1989–1991: Vulkan Petropavlovsk-Kamchatsky

Valentin Yakovlevich Tugarin (Russian: Валентин Яковлевич Тугарин; 5 May 1931 – 1998) was a Soviet football manager.

== Coach career ==
In 1971, Tugarin worked at the club FC Avanhard Sevastopol as a director of the club. Since 1965, coached FC Desna Chernihiv, Avanhard Rivne, Spartak Ivano-Frankivsk, Kryvbas Kryvyi Rih, Atlantyka Sevastopol and Vulkan Petropavlovsk-Kamchatsky.
