= Oleksandr Shchanov =

Soviet footballer

Personal information
- Full name: Oleksandr Ivanovych Shchanov
- Date of birth: 13 July 1924
- Place of birth: Ivanovo, Soviet Union
- Date of death: 6 November 2009 (aged 85)
- Place of death: Kyiv, Ukraine
- Position: Forward

Youth career
- 1940: Osnova Ivanovo

Senior career*
Years	Team	Apps	(Gls)
1946–1952	FC Dynamo Kyiv	20	(0)
1954	ODO Kiev	4	(0)

Managerial career
- 1952–1954: FC Dynamo Kyiv (assistant)
- 1954–1955: FShM Kyiv (assistant)
- 1955: Dynamo Kyiv (director)
- 1955–1956: FC Spartak Stanislav
- 1957: FC Arsenal Kyiv (assistant)
- 1957–1959: FC Spartak Stanislav
- 1959: FC Temp Kyiv (assistant)
- 1960: FC Avangard Chernihiv
- 1962–1963: FC Avangard Kharkiv (assistant)
- 1963: FC SKA Kyiv (assistant)
- 1964: FC Spartak Ivano-Frankivsk
- 1965: FC Temp Kyiv
- * Club domestic league appearances and goals

Oleksandr Shchanov (Ukrainian: Олександр Іванович Щанов, Russian: Александр Иванович Щанов; 13 July 1924 – 6 November 2009) was a Ukrainian football defender, forward, and manager. He was also a World War II veteran who fought in the Eastern Front.

== Playing career ==
Shchanov played in local Osnova Ivanovo since his childhood. Shchanov played for FC Dynamo Kyiv. Due to a knee injury in 1952, he was forced to end his playing career.

== Coaching career ==
At the beginning of his coaching career, Shchanov trained young players in Dynamo Kyiv. From 1954 to 1955, he trained youth in FShM Kyiv (The Football School Youth). In May 1955, he returned to Dynamo Kyiv, where he worked as a manager of the team. In September 1955, he was invited to lead FC Spartak Stanislav, and by managing this team, he became the champion of the Ukrainian SSR in 1955. He worked with a number of football clubs, including FC Temp Kyiv, FC Avangard Chernihiv, FC Avangard Kharkiv, and FC SKA Kyiv.

== Personal life ==
In addition to participating in football, Shchanov fought in World War II. His knee injury in 1952 prevented him from continuing his original career as a player.

On 6 November 2009, Oleksandr Ivanovych Shchanov died at the age of 86.

== Honours ==
=== Player ===
- Soviet Top League Reserves: 1952 Champion

=== Coach ===
- Ukrainian SRR Champion: 1955
