= Volodymyr Levin =

Ukrainian politician and businessman

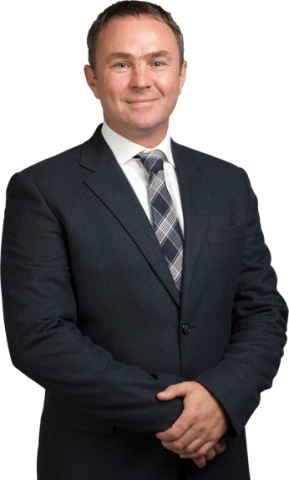
- Левін Володимир Ілліч
- Born: Levin Illich Volodymyr; 1 June 1970 (age 56); Kyiv, Ukrainian SSR, Soviet Union
- Other occupation: Chairman of Desna Chernihiv

Volodymyr Illich Levin (Ukrainian: Володимир Ілліч Левін; born 1 June 1970) is a Ukrainian politician and businessman. In 2017 he became chairman of Desna Chernihiv.

== Biography ==
Levin was born in Kyiv and he is a Member of the Kyiv City Council of the VIII convocation (Solidarity faction).Also Member of the Council of Entrepreneurs under the Cabinet of Ministers of Ukraine, member of the Public Council under the Ministry of Finance of Ukraine, Vice-President of the Ukrainian Market, President of the Chernihiv Desna Football Club. He is also a Member of the Standing Committee on Budget and Socio-Economic Development of the Kyiv City Council.

=== Economic studies ===
Since 2019, Volodymyr Levin has been working on the technical implementation of Universal Basic Income (UBI). He is currently stating that the Russian invasion of Ukraine is the perfect opportunity to implement UBI. He has written 4 papers discussing and explaining how can it be implemented.

=== Political career ===
Since 2013, he has been a member of the Council of Entrepreneurs under the Cabinet of Ministers of Ukraine. In addition to working in the Kyiv City Council, the candidate manages several companies, including AF-Leasing LLC, which is listed as his place of work on the CEC website. In 2015, he was elected a deputy of the Kyiv City Council from the BPP Solidarity in 86 constituencies of the Obolon district. Member of the Standing Committee on Budget and Socio-Economic Development.

In 2022 According to Chernihiv Region Events and Comments, Volodymyr Levin, President of Desna Chernihiv, is being considered the main candidate from the Servant of the People in the 206th constituency election. A sociological campaign close to the Servants of the People has already included Volodymyr Levin in the initial poll, which is currently underway in 206 constituencies.

=== Sports and patronage ===
In 2017 Levin become the president of Desna Chernihiv. He managed to sign the Estonian international Joonas Tamm, the goalkeeper Yevhen Past and bring the club to the Ukrainian Premier League. The team got into the Europa League third qualifying round for the first time in the history of the club. The striker Oleksandr Filippov was sold for 1.5 million of euro, becoming the most expensive player sold by the club, with some Italian clubs interested on the player.

In summer 2021, the club went through a financial turmoil. 15 players were sold, 13 were acquired. In February 2022, after he made public his candidacy for the Servant of the People in the 206th constituency election, he announced the plan to build a Yuri Gagarin Stadium in Chernihiv. In May 2022 in a meeting of UPL clubs asked to support the Chernihiv club in the 2022/23 season after the russian aggression. He also confirmed that the leadership of the club will not give up and that the main plan is to build a children's academy and training fields, restore the team.
