= Oleksandr Deriberin =

Soviet footballer and Ukrainian coach (born 1967)

Personal information
- Full name: Oleksandr Pavlovych Deriberin
- Date of birth: 25 February 1967 (age 59)
- Place of birth: Maykop, Adyghe AO, Russian SFSR
- Height: 1.92 m (6 ft 3 1/2 in)
- Position: Goalkeeper

Senior career*
Years	Team	Apps	(Gls)
1986	FC Druzhba Maykop	2	(0)
1988–1989	FC Druzhba Maykop	36	(0)
1990	FC Spartak Anapa	13	(0)
1991	FC Khimik Belorechensk	5	(0)
1991	FC Etalon Baksan	16	(0)
1992–1993	FC Druzhba Maykop	52	(0)
1995	FC Puteyets Belorechensk		

Managerial career
- 1995–2002: RVUFK Kyiv (academy)
- 2002–2003: FC Mostransgaz Gazoprovod (assistant)
- 2004–2005: PFC Nyva Vinnytsia (GK coach)
- 2004–2006: Ukraine U17 (assistant)
- 2005–2007: FC Nafkom Brovary
- 2008–2010: Ukraine U17 (assistant)
- 2010: FC Zirka Kirovohrad
- 2011–2012: FC Desna Chernihiv
- 2012: FC Desna Chernihiv (director of sports)
- 2016: FC Druzhba Maykop
- 2016–: Neftchi Baku (assistant)
- * Club domestic league appearances and goals

Oleksandr Deriberin (Ukrainian: Олександр Павлович Деріберін; born 25 February 1967) is a retired Soviet footballer and currently Ukrainian coach.

Deriberin was born in Maykop, Adyghe Autonomous Oblast, Russian SFSR, Soviet Union. From July 2011 to March 2012 he coached the clubs FC Desna Chernihiv and FC Druzhba Maykop.
