= FC Desna Chernihiv =

Professional football club based in Chernihiv, Ukraine

Desna Chernihiv
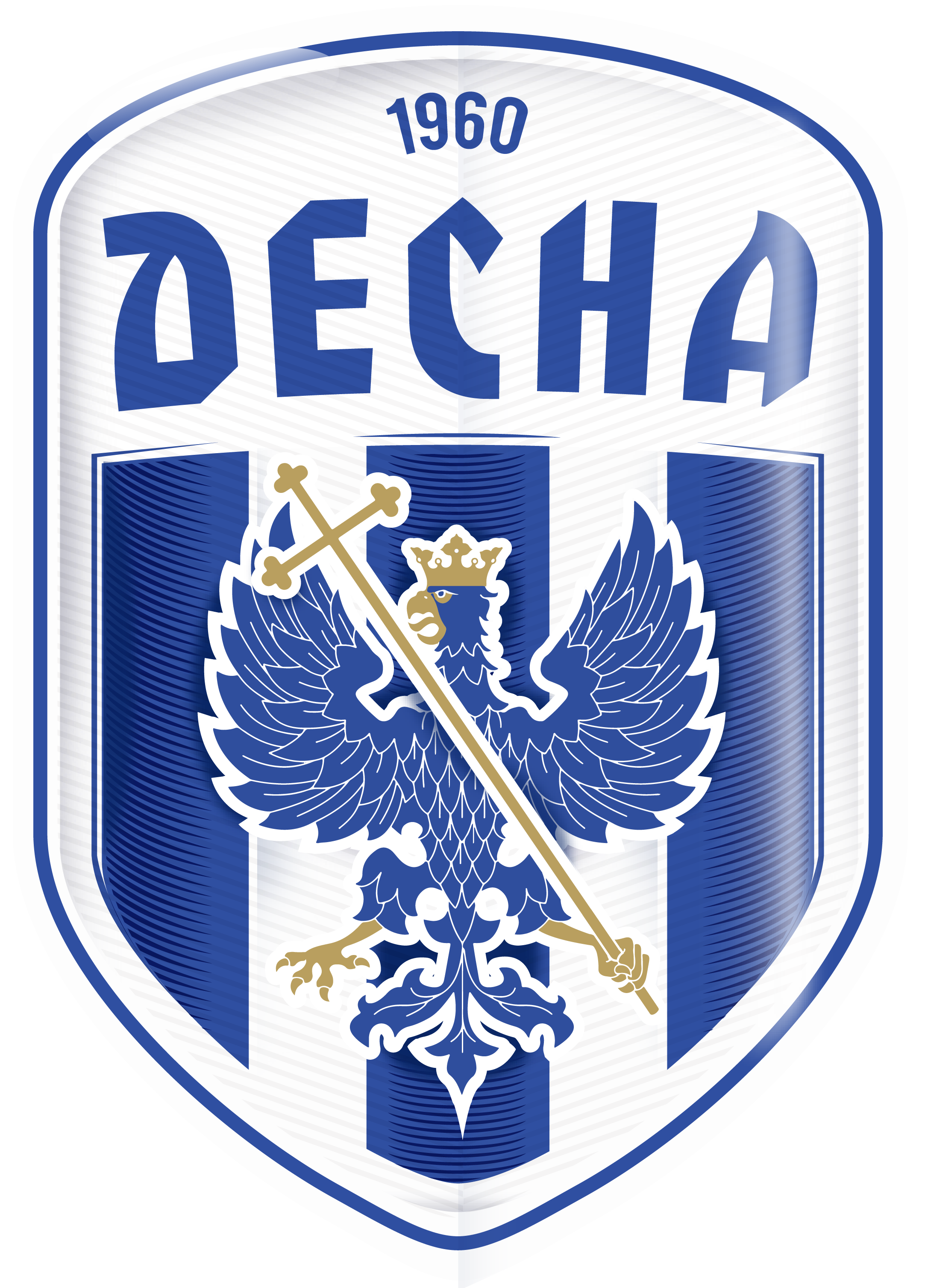
- Full name: Football Club Desna Chernihiv
- Nickname: Siveriany
- Founded: 1960; 66 years ago
- Ground: Vacant
- Capacity: 12,060
- Chairman: Volodymyr Levin
- Manager: Oleksandr Ryabokon
- League: Chernihiv Oblast Championship
- 2021–22: Ukrainian Premier League, 7th of 16
- Website: http://desna.football/
Home colours	Away colours

Football Club Desna Chernihiv (Ukrainian: ФК «Десна» Чернігів) is a Ukrainian football club based in Chernihiv. The original name of the club was "Avanhard" (FC Avanhard Chernihiv) during its first year of existence as part of a republican Avanhard sports society. Between 1961 and 1970 the club was called Desna. In 1972, it was replaced with SC Chernihiv (team of the SKA Kyiv) that played in Chernihiv for the next couple of years. In 1977, the Desna name was revived in place of the amateur club "FC Khimik Chernihiv" that won regional competitions.

Due to the infrastructure of the club being destroyed by the Russian military during the Siege of Chernihiv in 2022, the club pulled out of professional tournaments and plays irregular amateur-level matches (e.g. the Chernihiv Oblast Championship). Desna, along with FC Mariupol, were awarded rights to play in the Ukrainian Premier League in the future case of restoring their infrastructure. In 2025, both clubs were excluded from the Premier League, with the question of determining their professional status being delegated to the Ukrainian Association of Football.

== History ==
=== Original team of masters Avanhard Chernihiv ===
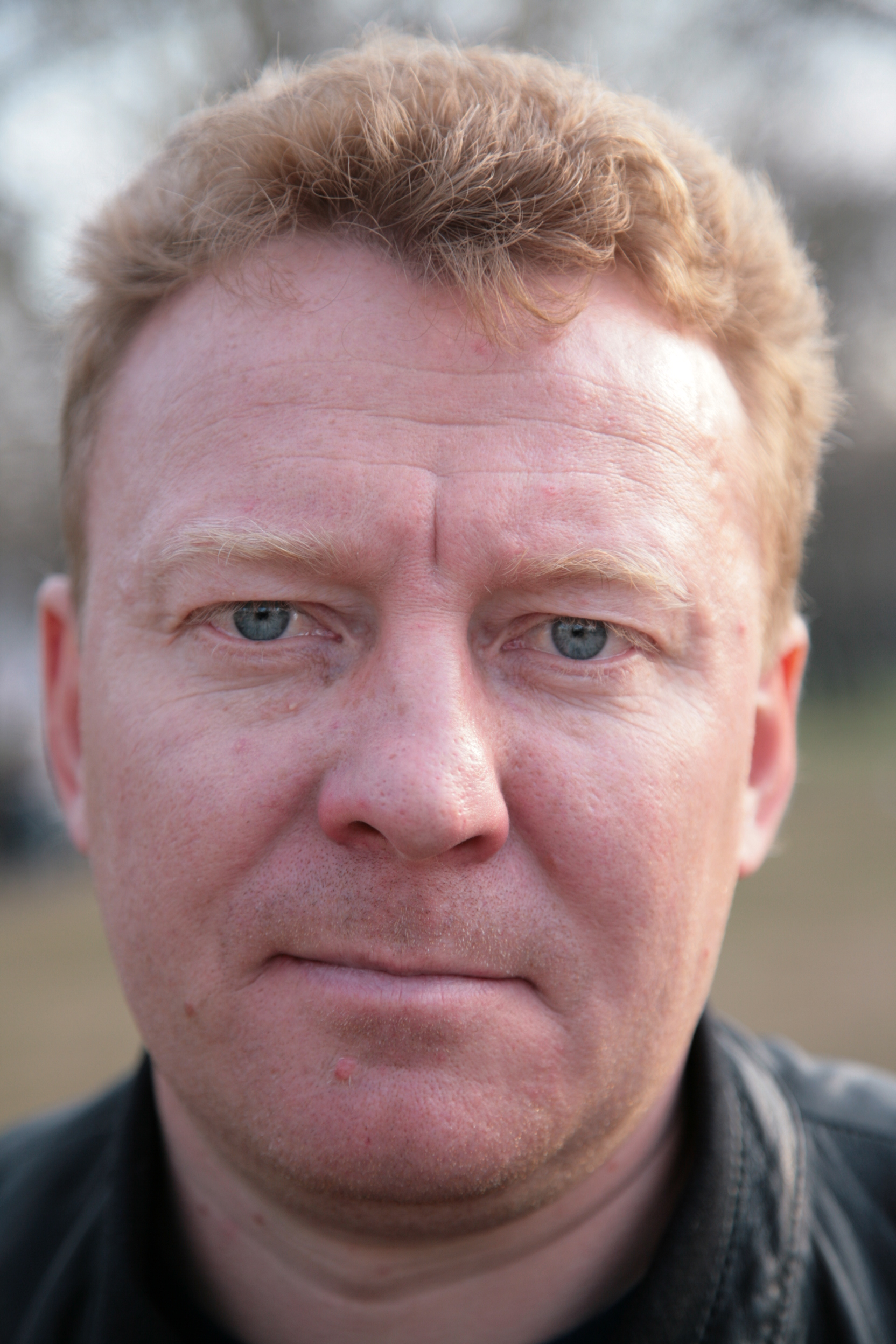
Oleh Kuznetsov, played for FC Desna Chernihiv in the season 1981–1982

The team of masters was established in Chernihiv in 1960 under the name "Avanhard" as part of the republican Avanhard sports society and entering competitions of the class "B" competitions (concurrently Football Championship of the Ukrainian SSR). That year the Chernihiv team "Avanhard" would take part in the state football championship (challenge) among the Class B teams. The team was created on already existing Chernihiv city team that also was known as Avanhard and played earlier in republican level competitions.

In the season 1958, "Avanhard Chernihiv", signed Viktor Bannikov for one year, considered one of the best goalkeepers in the Soviet Union earning the title of the best twice in 1964 and 1970 and distinguished Master of Sport of USSR (1991). From 1966 to 1979 the goalkeeper was Yuriy Hruznov from Chernihiv.

In the "Avanhard Chernihiv"'s squad were included better footballers of the region (Chernihiv Oblast). Among them are goalkeeper V.Lomako, field players V.Kravchynskyi, Yu.Shkolnikov, O.Finkelberh, and others, in such way the chairman of regional council of sports societies and organizations V.Tatur informed readers of "Desnyanska Pravda" on 10 February 1960. "The team's coach is appointed a former Dynamo Kyiv player Aleksandr Shchanov. These days "Avanhard" will proceed with its training and in already the nearest future in Chernihiv will start reconstruction and upgrade of the city's stadium. In its construction will take part quite a few city residents, public, youth, and Komsomol activists". Over 26 seasons in the USSR championships, Desna played 1,099 matches, of which 380 won, 301 – tied and 418 – lost. They scored 1145 goals, conceded – 1251.

In February, "Avanhard Chernihiv" took part in the winter championship of the Chernihiv Oblast (see Chernihiv Oblast Football Federation), and the team played their first official match on 17 April 1960, in Kirovohrad against the "Zirka" (0:3). The next match, "Avanhard" held a draw with Kyivan "Arsenal" (0:0), and then lost at its home field to "Lokomotyv" out of Vinnytsia (today FC Nyva Vinnytsia) with a score of 0:6. In May 1960, Aleksandr Shchanov was dismissed. The duties of a head coach were performed by his assistant Anatoliy Zhigan, who was approved in this position in July 1960. In its first season in the USSR championship, the team took 16th place out of 17 teams in the 1st zone of the Ukrainian Class B class (second tier) and won relegation playoff against Avanhard Pryluky to stay in the league.

=== Name Change from "Avanhard Chernihiv" to "FC Desna Chernihiv" ===
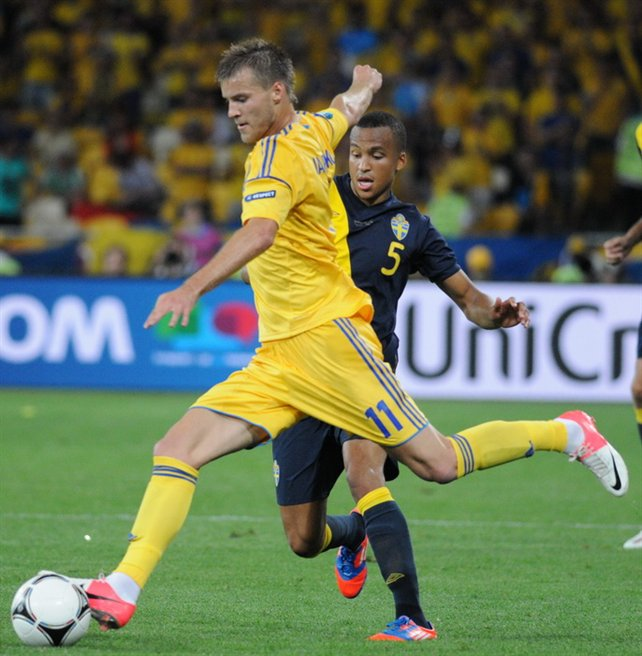
Andriy Yarmolenko in the season 2006/2007 played for FC Desna Chernihiv

In 1961 the team received the name "Desna". According to the results of the 1961 season, Desna took the 5th place in its group and the 10th place in the final of the Ukrainian SSR (class "B"). Among all the Ukrainian teams of the championship of the USSR Chernihiv team was the 13th.

In 1962, the team was coached by Yevgeny Goryansky and in 1965 Desna achieved its highest achievement in the Soviet Union era. Defeating six opponents, including class "A" teams – "Shinnik" and "Neftçi", the team reached the 1/8 finals of the USSR Cup, where they lost to "Kairat" in Almaty with a score 3:4. The following season, the team fought for leadership in the first zone of the Ukrainian class "B" – the winners were given the right to fight for securing the second group of the "A" class (later reorganized into the First League). "Desna" skipped forward only Khmelnitsky "Dynamo", and in the overall standings took the 4th place in the championship of the Ukrainian SSR.

In 1968, Desna, taking fourth place in the final tournament of the best Ukrainian teams of the "B" class, won a ticket to the second group of the "A" class. At the end of the 1970 season, the team took 11th place among 22 teams, but at the end of the year the decision of the new head of the Chernihiv region was to disband the club. In 1972 the city of Chernihiv was represented by a football team called the "team of Chernihiv city" and later renamed as SC Chernihiv. The team represented the Armed Forces of Kiev Military District and better known as SKA Kyiv. The 1976 season was its last season at professional level.

At the same period of time in 1976 "Khimik" Chernihiv, led by the former player of the Desna, Yukhym Shkolnykov, won the Ukrainian SSR championship among the physical culture teams, thus gaining an opportunity to participate at professional level, the Soviet Second League. In 1977 "Desna", the composition of which was formed from the former players of "Khimik" Chernihiv, entered the Soviet Second League. In the season 1981–1982 Oleh Kuznetsov, started his career in FC Desna Chernihiv, as the family moved to Chernihiv and later he played for Dynamo Kyiv, Rangers, Maccabi Haifa and CSKA-Borysfen Kyiv, winning UEFA Cup Winners' Cup, Soviet Top League, Soviet Cup. Scottish Premier Division, Scottish League Cup, Scottish Cup with Rangers. He also got the final with Soviet Union in UEFA Euro 1988 in the West Germany with 11th and 17th places for Ballon d'Or in 1988 and 1989. In summer 1982, the club signed Oleksandr Ryabokon as defender and the team, placed 2nd in the Ukrainian zone of the Second League, won silver medals of the football championship of the Ukrainian SSR. In the season 1983–1984 the team was coached by the experience of Yevgeny Goryansky having coached Soviet Union and clubs like FC Dinamo Minsk, FC Dynamo Moscow, FC Dynamo Kyiv and FC Zenit Leningrad. In 1990 the club got into the semifinal of Cup of the Ukrainian SSR against Naftovyk Okhtyrka. In 1991 he got into the quarterfinal of Cup of the Ukrainian SSR against Kryvbas Kryvyi Rih.

=== Transition from Soviet competitions to Ukrainian ===
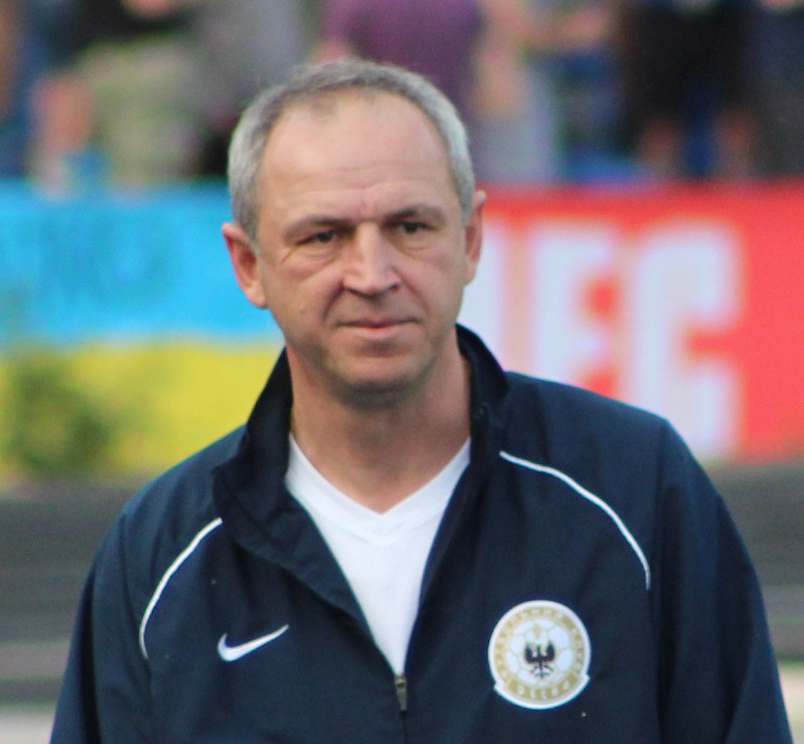
Oleksandr Ryabokon, the head-coach era of FC Desna, since 2012 and elected Best Coach of Ukrainian First League in 2016–17

After the collapse of the Soviet Union and the proclamation of Ukraine's independence, Desna started playing in the Ukrainian First League, but in the season 1993/94 it was relegated to the third tier. The coach was Yuriy Hruznov from 1990 to 1993 and the club won the Ukrainian Second League group tournament in the season 1996–97, the team returned to the First League for two seasons. Since 1999, for seven seasons, Chernihiv footballers performed in the Second League. In the Summer 2003, the club acquired the Serbia defender Milan Zagorac and the coach was Vadym Lazorenko from 2002 to 2004. Desna got second in the Ukrainian Second League with Oleksandr Kozhemyachenko top scores with 21 goals and the season 2005–06 finally won the and Ukrainian Second League and the club return the team to the Ukrainian First League in the season 2006–07. First League in the championship of 2005/06 mentors Olexandr Tomakh and Yukhym Shkolnykov were managed.

In summer time 2006, FC Desna signed the professional Forward Andriy Yarmolenko, who played for who played for FC Dynamo Kyiv, Borussia Dortmund and now plays for West Ham United F.C. He also played for under-21 squad for also participated in the 2008 UEFA European Under-19 Championship qualification. He later participated in qualification and finals of the 2011 UEFA European Under-21 Football Championship. With the Ukraine National Team, in the 2010 FIFA World Cup qualification game against Andorra, Yarmolenko made his first senior appearance for Ukraine and scored in a 5–0 win. On 2 September 2011, in an international friendly against Uruguay in Kharkiv, Yarmolenko set a national team record by scoring 14 seconds into the match, the fastest time in which a Ukraine national team player has scored a goal. UEFA Euro 2016 qualifying, play-off victory over Slovenia to qualify the nation for Euro 2016.

In August 2007 Desna changed its president and the new president became a local activist and businessman Oleksiy Savchenko who headed a public organization "For Chernihiv!". In the 2007/08 season Desna took the 4th place in the Ukrainian First League, which at that time was the best result of the team in the Ukrainian championship. In October 2008 the club's president Oleksiy Savchenko made a huge announcement stating that he paid around $5,000 to $15,000 to referees for the club to get the needed result. The Football Federation of Ukraine (today Ukrainian Association of Football) was not able to ignore such announcement and Hryhoriy Surkis took it under a personal control and called on the General Prosecutor's Office to initiate an investigation. As a result the FFU Control and Disciplinary Commission prohibited Savchenko and former Desna head coach Kucherenko perform any duties connected with football until the end of the investigation. In addition, five Ukrainian referees were suspended of their duties during that time as well. In November 2008 the club's president Oleksiy Savchenko announced that he sold 50% of the club's stock for ₴10 million and the club's co-owner became Ukrainian parliamentarian of Party of Regions Pavlo Klymets who was the owner of "Olimp" company specializing in production of vodka. Later in 2008 in interview Savchenko denied the fact that he ever stated of "greasing" referees for the club. And he also denied the fact of selling the club stating that he transferred the club to the city authorities for free.

During the winter break of the 2008/09, the Desna leadership changed again and the new president Korotkov invited "experimental" head coach Mykhailo Dunets who in the fall half headed Komunalnyk Luhansk that became insolvent. Korotkov already worked with Dunets back in 1990s in Veres. Following the 2008/09 season, Desna faced serious financial crisis and the club's players refused to play due to unpaid wages. In the middle of July 2009 Dunets was forced to take a leave and he tried to fight requesting to be officially relinquished of duties. His protest was ignored and few days later Oleksandr Ryabokon became the new head coach. After the end of the 2009/10 season Desna was deprived of professional status due to the fact that it did not pass the certification, but the new authority managed to revive the team and declare it in the Second League.

With the election of Viktor Yanukovych in 2010 the ownership of Desna was taken over by Oleksiy Chebotaryov who had close relationships with Yanukovych, Minister of Interior Vitaliy Zakharchenko and General Prosecutor Shokin. In the season 2011–12, the coach was Oleksandr Deriberin that brought the club at the second place in Ukrainian Second League and gained the playoff. Following the Euromaidan as many other members of Party of Regions Chebotaryov runaway from Ukraine to Moscow.

=== Promotion to Ukrainian Premier League ===
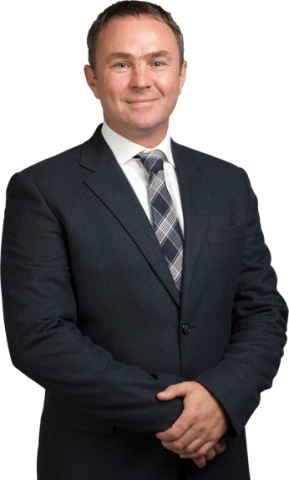
Volodymyr Levin, the president who managed to bring the club in Ukrainian Premier League.

In the 2012–13 season, Desna won the Ukrainian Second League title and rose in the class. Following the results of the championship of 2013/14 the team took the 5th position in the First League. In the Ukrainian Cup in the season 2013–14, the team for the first time in history reached the quarter finals, having beaten "Metalurh" Zaporizhya (1:1, in a penalty shootout – 5:4) on its field. In the match 1/4 finals with the "Shakhtar" "Desna" lost with a score of 0:2. The coach Oleksandr Ryabokon was elected best coach of the Ukrainian First League in the season 2016–17.

In the summer 2016, the club signed the striker Oleksandr Filippov, from FC Avanhard Kramatorsk and in 2016/17 season Desna won the silver medals of the First League and for the first time in history gained the right to compete in the Premier League.

However, on 1 June 2017, it was announced that Desna was denied in receiving license to play in the top division. The argument was that the club is not able to provide guarantees for an adequate financing of infrastructure. In reality, the problem was not only in half-shady financial irregularities, but also shady ownership of the club. The license was received by NK Veres Rivne, the third-placed team during the last season in the second-tier division.

Both clubs FC Desna Chernihiv and NK Veres Rivne did not play at their home stadiums in the 2016–17 Ukrainian First League. The first one played in Kyiv at the Obolon Arena, while the other one played in Varash, at the Izotop Stadium of the Rivne Nuclear Power Plant. The administration of Desna released a letter of protest before a meeting of FFU representative. On 2 June 2017, it was announced about the final composition of the clubs and calendar for the upcoming season. In October 2017 the club's ownership was passed to Volodymyr Levin. According to the results of the 2017/18 season Desna won the bronze medals of the First League and gained the right to compete in the Premier League through the play-offs against Zirka Kropyvnytskyi. The captain Denys Favorov was elected Best Player Ukrainian First League in the season 2017–18. The team got into the Quarterfinals of the Ukrainian Cup in the season 2017–18 against Dynamo Kyiv.

=== Fair Play prize of Ukrainian Premier League ===
In the summer of 2020, the captain Denys Favorov left the club after 4 years, to the surprise of many people, as the club chose not to extend his contract. It was particularly surprising given that Favorov was elected Ukrainian Footballer of the Year in 2020. The striker Oleksandr Filippov was sold for 1.5 million euros, becoming the most expensive player sold by the club, also with some Italian clubs interested in the player. After the draw for the Europa League third qualifying round, Desna got the German team VfL Wolfsburg and on 24 September 2020 they lost 2–0 at the AOK Stadion.

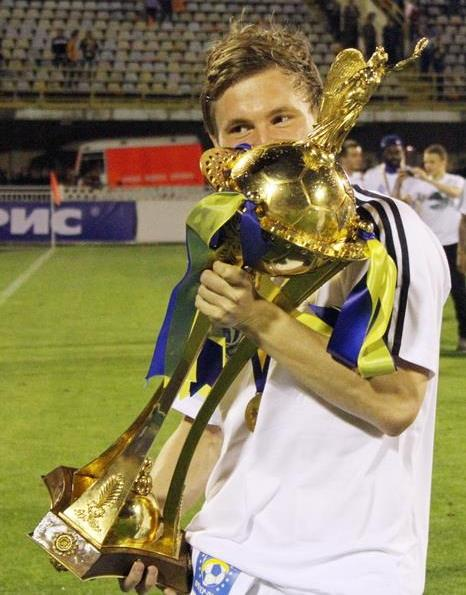
Vladyslav Kalitvintsev, the first player belonging to Desna Chernihiv to be called in the Ukraine national football team.

In October 2020 Yukhym Konoplya (on loan from Shakhtar Donetsk), has been called for the Ukraine national football team, for friendly match against France and UEFA Nations League matches against Germany and Spain on 7, 10 and 13 October 2020 respectively, becoming the first player of playing in Desna Chernihiv, called in the Ukraine national team.

In January 2021, the team has won the Fair Play prize in the UPL as the best team in the season 2019–20.The award ceremony was attended by the President of the Ukrainian Football Association, UEFA Executive Committee member Andriy Pavelko, UAF First Vice President Oleh Protasov, UAF Referees Committee Chairman Luciano Luci, UPL Executive Director Yevhen Dyky and PFL President Oleksandr Kadenko.

In summer of 2021 the club fails to qualify for the cups and according with the president of the club, Volodymyr Levin, said that the club has a 4-month debt to the players for the payment of salaries and the management of the UPL club decided to cut the budget for the 2021/22 season. A number of players have left Desna. The club begins the rejuvenation of the team, leaving starting players who have made the history of the club and begins to develop the team's academy and choose some of Desna 2 players. The team was requalified and new young players has been added into the club with good results at the beginning of the season to the surprise of many people and the press. In September 2021, Vladyslav Kalitvintsev has been included in the reserve team of Ukraine national football team against Finland, becoming the first player belonging to Desna to be called in the Ukraine national football team.

== Infrastructure ==
=== Stadium ===
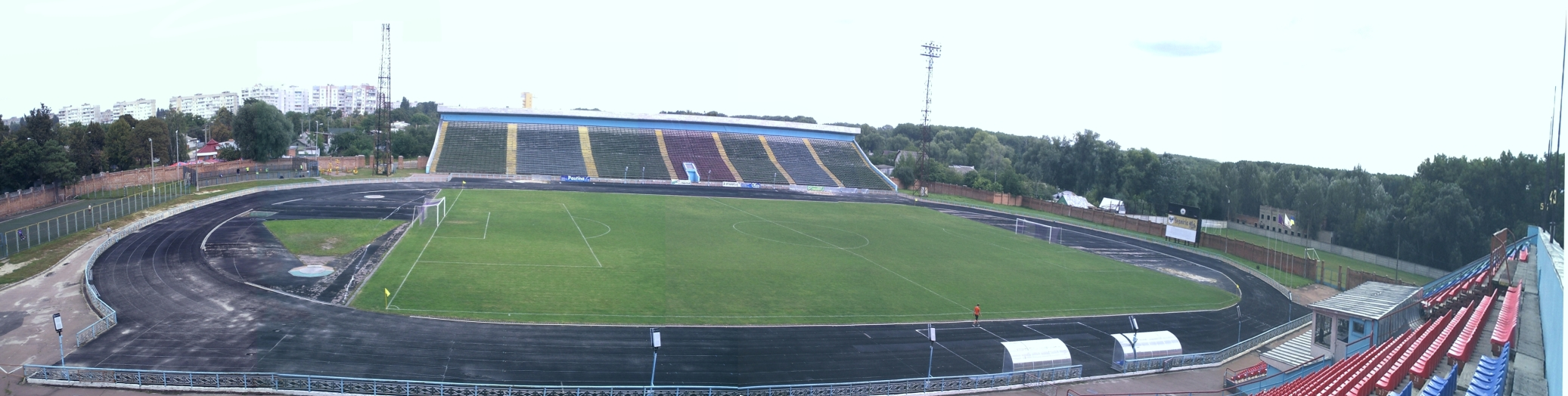
Stadion Yuri Gagarin in Chernihiv

The team play in the Olympic sports training center "Chernihiv" (formerly Stadion Yuriya Gagarina). The Stadion Yuri Gagarin in Chernihiv was built in 1936 for 3,000 spectators in eastern portion of a city park (garden) that exists since 1804 and where previously was located residence of the Chernihiv Archbishops. During World War II, the Chernihiv Stadium was heavily damaged and in the 1950s was completely reconstructed, included stadium walls and two stands for 11,000 spectators. In 1961, it was named after the Russian Soviet cosmonaut Yuri Gagarin. On 25 May 1964, Gagarin in person attended the stadium. In the mid 1980s, the stadium capacity was increased to 14,000. The stadium was heavily damaged by Russian forces during the Siege of Chernihiv in 2022.

=== Training centre ===
Desna Chernihiv, train in the "Olympic sports training center" and sometime in Chernihiv Arena, which is belong of FC Chernihiv. Desna Chernihiv and the young brother team FC Chernihiv, want to build football fields and other sports infrastructure. Both plots are located in the ZAZ neighborhood near Kiltseva – Voloshkova – Kalinova – Dachna streets. The first has an area of 1.4794 hectares, its regulatory monetary value is ₴1,923,367.94. Based on the results of the bidding, the relevant agreement will be concluded by 31 December 2026. The area of the second plot is 3.9469 hectares, its normative monetary value is ₴5,131,364.69. The agreement will be valid until 31 December 2025.

=== Youth, academy and reserves ===
The club has few reserve teams, the main one is FC Desna-2 Chernihiv, which in 2008 entered the professional leagues for the first time. The team had been competing in the Chernihivska Oblast competition and prepared themselves in the fourth-level 2008 Ukrainian Football Amateur League. The club has, the Youth Sports School called Yunist Chernihiv, where produced players like Andriy Yarmolenko. The academy of Desna, produced also Illya Shevtsov, which become the top scorer for the Ukrainian Premier League Reserves in the season 2019–20. In 2021, the club planned to create a children's academy.

== Desna's supporters ==
The fans of FC Desna Chernihiv are called Ultras Desna. During FC Desna Chernihiv matches, the fan area is a strip of white and blue colors. On 12 March 2020 during the Quarterfinal match against Vorskla Poltava, the match was played behind closed doors due to quarantine in Ukraine during COVID-19 pandemic and "Ultra Desna" supported the team outside the Stadion Yuri Gagarin. They are also active in many social media like the Russian-based Telegram Channel. There are fans outside Ukraine, like in Italy but there is also an Australian fan of Desna called Ian Brush who constantly travels from England to Ukraine to see the team playing at home and away since 2016 supporting the club.

== Honours and distinctions ==
=== Domestic competitions ===
- Ukrainian First League

Runners-up (1): 2016–17

- Ukrainian Second League

Winners (3): 1996–97 (Group A), 2005–06 (Group A), 2012–13 (Group A) (record)
Runners-up (4): 2000–01 (Group C), 2003–04 (Group C), 2004–05 (Group C), 2011–12 (Group A)

- Cup of the Ukrainian SSR

Semifinal (1) 1990

- Championship of the Ukrainian SSR

Runners-up (2): 1982, 1966
Runners-up (1): 1968

- Ukrainian Amateur Football Championship

Winners (1): 1976 as Khimik Chernihiv

- Ukrainian First League

Winners (1) Fair Play award 2017–18 season

- Ukrainian Premier League

Winners (1) Fair Play award 2019–20 season

=== Individual Player & Coach awards ===
Ukrainian Footballer of the Year

- (Ukraine) Denys Favorov 2020 (Desna, Zorya)

Best Coach of Ukrainian First League

- (Ukraine) Oleksandr Ryabokon 2016–17

Best Player of Ukrainian First League

- (Ukraine) Denys Favorov 2017–18

Top Scorer of Ukrainian Second League

- (Ukraine) Oleksandr Kozhemyachenko: 2010–11 (12 goals)
- (Ukraine) Oleksandr Kozhemyachenko: 2004–05 (20 goals)
- (Ukraine) Oleksandr Kozhemyachenko: 2005–06 (21 goals)

Top Scorer Ukrainian Premier League Reserves (Under 21)

- (Ukraine) Illya Shevtsov 2019–20

== Crest and colours ==
Coat of arms of Chernihiv

=== Crest ===
The crest of the club, which was created in early 2008 contained an image of an eagle from the coat of arms of Chernihiv and a sign of Chernihiv prince Mstyslav Volodymyrovych.

The modern crest, made in the traditional white and blue colors of the Desna, was presented on 27 July 2016. In the development of the emblem the fans of the team took part. On the shield is a stylized eagle – the main element of the city coat of arms of Chernihiv. The image of the eagle was used as a symbol of Chernihiv princes from the middle of the 10th century. The golden cross, which holds the eagle, symbolizes the importance of Christianity in the history of the city, one of the main spiritual centers of Ukraine. Vertical blue and white stripes on the emblem are based on the form in which the players of the Desna have been playing since 1962. The inscription "Desna" is made in a font that was used on the previous emblems of the club.

There are old crests of the club:

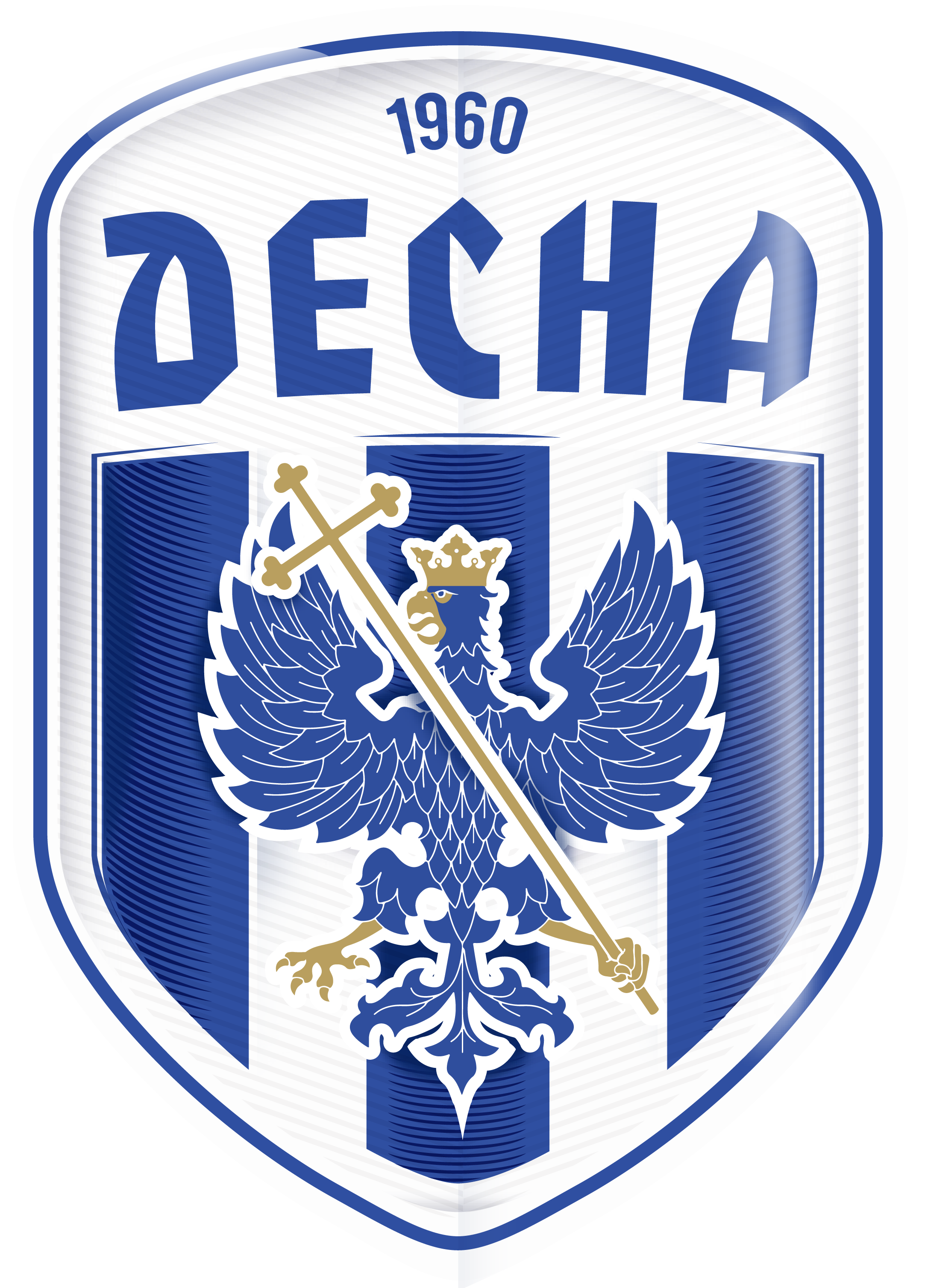
Club logo from 2016 to the present

=== Colours ===
The historical colours of Desna are white and blue. In the 1961 season, white and blue were used as home colours, green and blue as away colours. In a friendly match against Hammarby on 22 October 1961, Desna players wore red shirts and blue shorts.

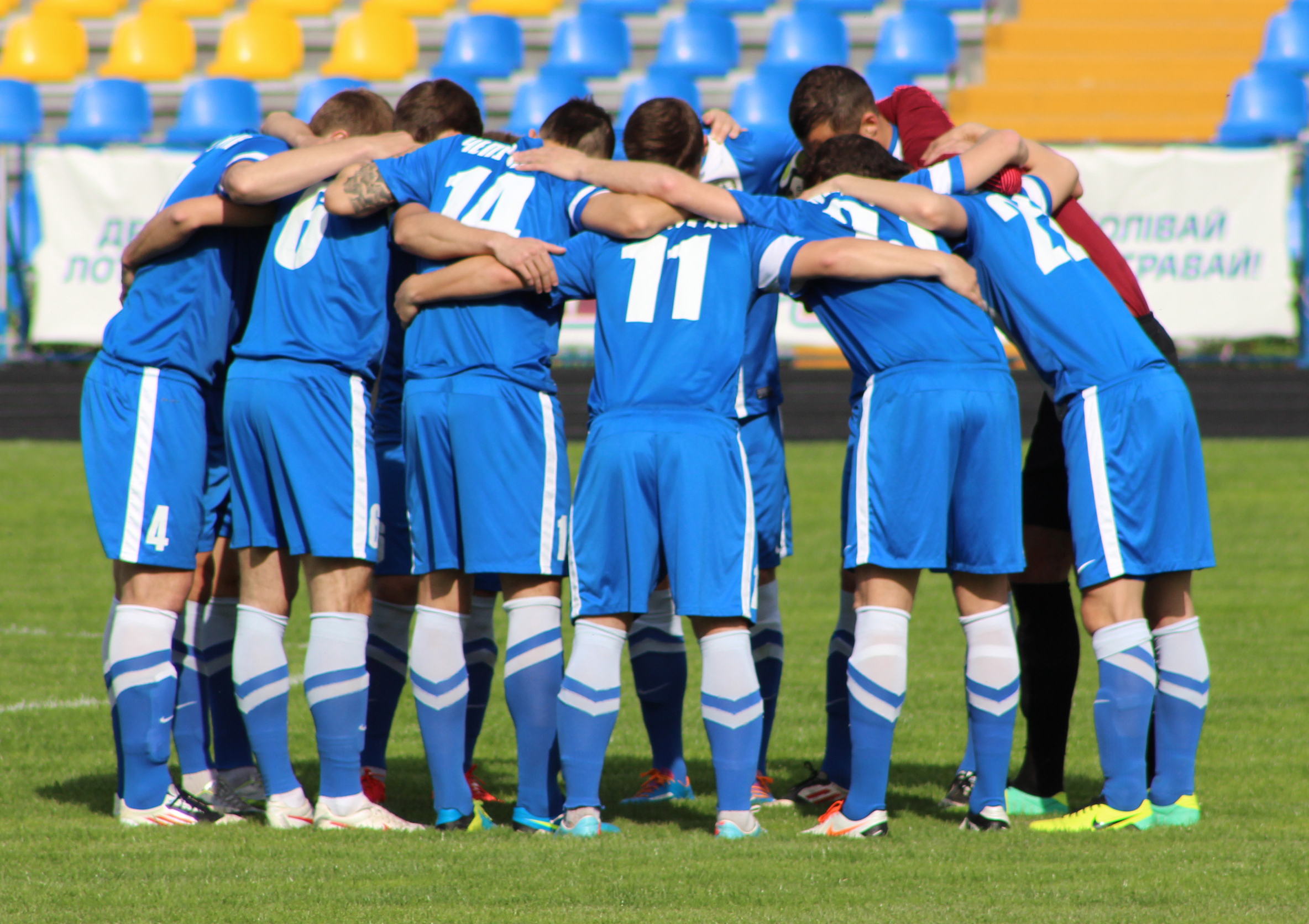
Desna Chernihiv players wearing blue and white kits on 22 May 2014

== Players ==
=== Current squad ===
As of 10 April 2023

Note: Flags indicate national team as defined under FIFA eligibility rules; some limited exceptions apply. Players may hold more than one non-FIFA nationality.

No. / Pos. / Nation / Player	No. / Pos. / Nation / Player

=== Other players under contract ===
Note: Flags indicate national team as defined under FIFA eligibility rules; some limited exceptions apply. Players may hold more than one non-FIFA nationality.

No. / Pos. / Nation / Player	No. / Pos. / Nation / Player

=== Out on loan ===
Note: Flags indicate national team as defined under FIFA eligibility rules; some limited exceptions apply. Players may hold more than one non-FIFA nationality.

No.	Pos.	Nation	Player

=== Reserve team ===
For the reserve squads, see Desna-2 Chernihiv and Desna-3 Chernihiv

Note: Flags indicate national team as defined under FIFA eligibility rules; some limited exceptions apply. Players may hold more than one non-FIFA nationality.

No.	Pos.	Nation	Player
—	GK	UKR	Oleksandr Khodachenko
—	DF	UKR	Bohdan Bozhok
—	DF	UKR	Artur Havrylenko
—	DF	UKR	Dmytro Zapeka
—	MF	UKR	Oleksandr Kabushka
—	MF	UKR	Serhiy Korshun
—	MF	UKR	Oleksandr Savchuk
—	MF	UKR	Bohdan Sheyko
—	MF	UKR	Andriy Slotyuk

No.	Pos.	Nation	Player
—	MF	UKR	Serhiy Makarenko
—	MF	UKR	Serhiy Stepanov
—	MF	UKR	Denys Kharchenko
—	MF	UKR	Vladyslav Yefymenko
—	MF	UKR	Denys Zibnytsky
—	MF	UKR	Mykola Pykhtar
—	MF	UKR	Denys Khapilin
—	MF	UKR	Nazar Shevaha
—	FW	UKR	Oleksiy Pashchenko

== Records ==
As of 22 September 2021

=== Most goals ===
No.	Player	Pos.	Tenure	Goals
1	(Ukraine) Oleksandr Kozhemyachenko	FW	1998–2002, 2002–12	128
2	(Soviet Union) Hennadiy Horshkov	FW	1977–79, 1980–87	112
3	(Soviet Union) (Ukraine) Volodymyr Avramenko	FW	1991–2004	59
4	(Soviet Union) Andriy Protsko	FW	1966–70, 1977–80	57
5	(Ukraine) Valentyn Krukovets	MF, FW	2003–07	51
6	(Ukraine) Ihor Bobovych	FW	1993–2007	50
7	(Ukraine) Oleksandr Filippov	FW	2016–21	48
8	(Soviet Union) Yukhym Shkolnykov	FW	1963–68	44
9	(Ukraine) Denys Favorov	DF	2016–20	39
9	(Ukraine) Yevhen Chepurnenko	MF	2012–14, 2015–17, 2021	39
10	(Ukraine) Yehor Kartushov	MF	2012–2022	33

=== Most appearances ===
No.	Player	Pos.	Tenure	App.
1	(Soviet Union) (Ukraine) Serhiy Sapronov	DF	1979–84, 1987–92, 1996–2000	474
2	(Soviet Union) Hennadiy Horshkov	FW	1977–79, 1980–87	385
3	(Soviet Union) Valeriy Kravchynskyi	DF	1960–70	383
4	(Soviet Union) Andriy Protsko	FW	1966–70, 1977–80	318
5	(Soviet Union) (Ukraine) Volodymyr Avramenko	FW	1991–2004	314
6	(Ukraine) Oleksandr Kozhemyachenko	FW	1998–2002, 2002–12	310
7	(Soviet Union) (Ukraine) Valentyn Buhlak	FW	1981–92	277
8	(Ukraine) Oleksandr Savenchuk	FW	1993–2004	275
9	(Soviet Union) (Ukraine) Viktor Rudyi	DF, MF, FW	1980–99	269
10	(Ukraine) Ihor Bobovych	FW	1993–2007	267

== Coaches and administration ==
Administration	Coaching (main team)	Coaching (U-21 team)	Coaching (U-19 team)
President – Volodymyr Levin; Director – Ihor Usharuk; Chief of squad – Vitaliy Kleimyonov; Sports director – Vadym Melnyk; Technical director – Andriy Smalko	Head coach – Oleksandr Ryabokon; Assistant coach – Oleksandr Prykhodko; Fitness coach – Oleh Tomashevskyi; Goalkeepers coach – Yuriy Ovcharov	Senior coach U21 – Oleksandr Datsyuk; Assistant coach U21 – Pavlo Shchedrakov; Senior coach U19 – Serhiy Bakun; Youth Academy – Volodymyr Matsuta	

== Managers and presidents ==
=== USSR ===
Dates	Name
1960	(Soviet Union) Oleksandr Shchanov
1960	(Soviet Union) Anatoly Zhyhan
1961	(Soviet Union) Yosyp Lifshyts
1962–1963	(Soviet Union) Yevgeny Goryansky
1963	(Soviet Union) Mykhaylo Chyrko
1964	(Soviet Union) Vadim Radzishevskiy
1965–1966	(Soviet Union) Valentin Tugarin
1966	(Soviet Union) Sergei Korshunov
1967	(Soviet Union) Viktor Zhiltsov
1967	(Soviet Union) Yevhen Lemeshko
1968	(Soviet Union) Valentin Tugarin
1969	(Soviet Union) Volodymyr Onyshchenko
1969–1970	(Soviet Union) Oleh Bazylevych
1970	(Soviet Union) Valeriy Kravchynskyi
1977–1982	(Soviet Union) Yukhym Shkolnykov
1983	(Soviet Union) Andriy Protsko
1983–1984	(Soviet Union) Yevgeny Goryansky
1985–1986	(Soviet Union) Mykhaylo Fomenko
1987	(Soviet Union) Andriy Protsko
1988–1989	(Soviet Union) Mykhailo Dunets
1989	(Soviet Union) Andriy Protsko (caretaker)

=== Ukraine ===
Dates	Name
1990–1993	(Ukraine) Yuriy Hruznov
1993	(Ukraine) Andriy Protsko (caretaker)
1994	(Ukraine) Viktor Dubino
1994–1996	(Ukraine) Andriy Protsko
1996–1999	(Ukraine) Yukhym Shkolnykov
1999–2002	(Ukraine) Yuriy Hruznov
2002–2004	(Ukraine) Vadym Lazorenko
2004–2007	(Ukraine) Oleksandr Tomakh
2007	(Ukraine) Serhiy Bakun (caretaker)
2007–2008	(Ukraine) Serhiy Kucherenko
2008	(Ukraine) Oleksandr Ryabokon
2009	(Ukraine) Mykhailo Dunets
2009	(Ukraine) Yuriy Ovcharov (caretaker)
2009–2010	(Ukraine) Oleksandr Ryabokon
2010	(Ukraine) Viktor Dohadaylo
2010	(Ukraine) Ihor Khimich (caretaker)
2010	(Ukraine) Oleh Melnychenko (caretaker)
2010	(Tajikistan) Vitaly Levchenko
2010	(Ukraine) Oleksiy Skala
2011	(Ukraine) Anatoly Byelay
2011–2012	(Ukraine) Oleksandr Deriberin
2012–	(Ukraine) Oleksandr Ryabokon

President	Citizenship	Period
Ivan Fedorets	Ukraine	January 1994 — 1997
Arkadiy Rynskyi	Ukraine	1997 — 1998
Volodymyr Khomenko	Ukraine	1998 — 1999
Ivan Chaus	Ukraine	September 1999 — August 2007
Oleksiy Savchenko	Ukraine	August 2007—2008
Pavlo Klymets	Ukraine	November 2008 — February 2009
Valeriy Korotkov	Ukraine	February 2009 — May 2009
Oleksandr Povorozniuk	Ukraine	May 2009 — 2010
Yuriy Tymoshok	Ukraine	2010 — 2012
Oleksiy Chebotaryov	Ukraine	2010 — 2017
Volodymyr Levin	Ukraine	2017—present

== League and cup history ==
=== Soviet Union ===
Season	Div.	Pos.	Pl.	W	D	L	GS	GA	P	Domestic Cup	Europe	Notes
1960	Class B, Ukraine I	16	32	5	6	21	29	62	16			Relegation playoff
1961	Class B, Ukraine I	5	34	13	13	8	50	49	39	UkSSR zone 1, Final (1/64)		Relegation playoff
1961	9–10 pos.	10	2	0	1	1	2	4	1	UkSSR zone 1, Final (1/64)		Relegation playoff
1962	Class B, Ukraine III	4	24	10	8	6	40	33	28	UkSSR zone, 1/8 finals (1/256)		Relegation playoff
1962	7–17 pos.	13	10	1	7	2	7	9	9	UkSSR zone, 1/8 finals (1/256)		Relegated
In 1963 Class A was expanded with an extra tier, Class B was downgraded
1963	Class B, Ukraine I	11	38	12	12	14	35	42	36	UkSSR zone 1, 1/4 finals (1/512)		
1963	21–22 pos.	21	2	1	0	1	4	3	2	UkSSR zone 1, 1/4 finals (1/512)		
1964	Class B, Ukraine I	11	30	8	10	12	23	31	26	UkSSR zone 1, Final (1/128)		
1964	25–30 pl.	25	10	4	5	1	15	8	13	UkSSR zone 1, Final (1/128)		
1965	Class B, Ukraine I	9	30	8	14	8	32	33	30	1/8 finals		
1965	19–24 pl.	21	10	4	2	4	13	14	10	1/8 finals		
1966	Class B, Ukraine I	2	38	19	11	8	56	32	49	1/128 finals		
1966	3–4 pl.	4	2	0	1	1	0	2	1	1/128 finals		
1967	Class B, Ukraine I	8	40	17	11	12	44	33	45	UkSSR zone 1, 1/8 finals (1/1024)		
1968	Class B, Ukraine II	3	40	24	6	10	50	27	54	Crimea zone, Final (1/256)		
1968	Final UkSSR	4	7	3	2	2	6	6	8	Crimea zone, Final (1/256)		Promoted
1969	Class A, Group 2, Subgroup 3	18	42	11	14	17	30	59	36	1/128 finals		Relegated
1970	Class A, Group 2, Zone 1	11	42	17	10	15	43	45	44	1/128 Finals		Disbanded
Desna was disbanded in 1971–76
1977	Second League, Zone 2	14	44	11	16	17	34	42	38			
1978	Second League, Zone 2	11	44	16	13	15	37	33	45			
1979	Second League, Zone 2	17	46	13	12	21	37	57	38			
1980	Second League, Zone 5	8	44	18	13	13	50	29	49			
1981	Second League, Zone 5	12	44	13	15	16	48	38	41			
1982	Second League, Zone 6	2	46	26	10	10	64	38	62			
1983	Second League, Zone 6	23	50	16	8	26	26	50	38			
1984	Second League, Zone 2, Group 1	11	24	6	5	13	24	39	17			
1984	Final 13–26 pl.	20	14	6	3	5	20	24	15			
1985	Second League, Zone 2, Group 1	10	26	7	6	13	26	36	20			
1985	Final 15–28 pl.	23	14	6	3	5	16	19	15			
1986	Second League, Zone 2, Group 1	10	26	8	7	11	25	31	23			
1986	Final 15–28 pl.	23	14	5	3	6	12	13	13			
1987	Second League, Zone 6	24	52	11	17	24	48	80	39			
1988	Second League, Zone 6	21	50	14	14	22	42	59	42			
1989	Second League, Zone 5	17	42	14	8	20	39	54	36			Relegated
1990	Soviet Lower Second League, Zone 1	12	36	13	6	17	35	39	32	UkSSR Cup, 1/2 finals		
1991	Soviet Lower Second League, Zone 1	13	50	20	9	21	59	59	49	UkSSR Cup, 1/4 finals		

=== Ukraine ===
Season	Div.	Pos.	Pl.	W	D	L	GS	GA	P	Domestic Cup	Europe		Notes
1992	2nd "A"	5	26	11	7	8	23	24	29	1/32 finals			
1992–93	2nd	19	42	13	9	20	42	49	35	1/64 finals			
1993–94	2nd	20	38	7	10	21	29	53	24	1/16 finals			Relegated
1994–95	3rd	11	42	17	7	18	44	43	58	1/32 finals			
1995–96	3rd "A"	7	40	21	9	10	55	30	72	1/32 finals			
1996–97	3rd "A"	1	30	26	6	4	39	12	66	1/32 finals Second stage			Promoted
1997–98	2nd	15	42	14	12	16	45	53	54	1/16 finals			
1998–99	2nd	19	38	7	6	25	28	60	27	1/32 finals			Relegated
1999-00	3rd "C"	9	26	11	5	10	27	32	38	1/16 finals Second League Cup			
2000–01	3rd "C"	2	30	18	5	7	66	29	59	1/16 finals Second League Cup			
2001–02	3rd "C"	4	34	18	6	10	57	43	60	Round 1			
2002–03	3rd "C"	3	28	19	1	8	36	25	58	1/32 finals			
2003–04	3rd "C"	2	30	23	5	2	67	25	74	1/32 finals			
2004–05	3rd "C"	2	28	21	4	3	59	26	67	1/8 finals			
2005–06	3rd "A"	1	28	24	2	2	76	13	74	1/32 finals			Promoted
2006–07	2nd	14	36	11	8	17	51	58	41	1/16 finals			
2007–08	2nd	4	38	20	7	11	61	44	67	1/8 finals			
2008–09	2nd	7	32	13	8	11	31	33	47	1/16 finals			
2009–10	2nd	8	34	12	12	10	38	30	48	1/32 finals			Relegated
2010–11	3rd "A"	5	22	12	4	6	38	24	40	1/64 finals			
2011–12	3rd "A"	2	26	18	5	3	48	19	59	1/32 finals			Play-off
2012–13	3rd "A"	1	20	14	6	0	35	12	48	1/16 finals			
2012–13	3rd "1"	1	30	20	9	1	55	22	69	1/16 finals			Promoted
2013–14	2nd	5	30	14	2	14	33	27	44	1/4 finals			
2014–15	2nd	5	30	12	11	7	44	27	47	1/16 finals			
2015–16	2nd	8	30	11	7	12	30	29	40	1/16 finals			
2016–17	2nd	2	34	22	8	4	55	23	74	1/8 finals			Denied Promotion
2017–18	2nd	3	34	22	5	7	71	25	71	1/4 finals			Promoted
2018–19	1st	8	32	12	5	15	35	41	41	1/8 finals			
2019–20	1st	4	32	17	5	10	59	33	56	1/4 finals			
2020–21	1st	6	26	10	8	8	38	32	38	1/8 finals	EL	3QR	
2021–22	1st	7	18	7	4	7	22	27	25	1/16 finals			

1 tier – 3 seasons (Ukraine)
2 tier – 4 seasons (USSR) + 14 seasons (Ukraine)
3 tier – 20 seasons (USSR) + 13 seasons (Ukraine)
4 tier – 2 seasons (USSR)

== European record ==
Desna qualified for European football for the first time in the 2020–21 season, where they made their debut in the Europa League.

Season	Competition	Round	Club	Home	Away	Aggregate
2020–21	UEFA Europa League	3QR	(Germany) VfL Wolfsburg	—N/a	0–2	—N/a

=== UEFA club rankings ===
Rank	Country	Team	Points	Years
197	(Ukraine)	Desna Chernihiv	5.520	2022

As of 23 April 2022.

== See also ==
- List of sport teams in Chernihiv
