= 1976 KFK competitions (Ukraine) =

KFK competitions
- Season: 1976
- Champions: Khimik Chernihiv

The 1976 KFK competitions in Ukraine were part of the 1976 Soviet KFK competitions that were conducted in the Soviet Union. It was 12th season of the KFK in Ukraine since its introduction in 1964.

== First stage ==
=== Group 1 ===
Pos	Team	Pld	W	D	L	GF	GA	GD	Pts
1	Sokil Lviv	18	15	2	1	23	5	+18	32
2	Khimik Kalush	18	10	6	2	28	18	+10	26
3	Sluch Krasyliv	18	8	6	4	34	17	+17	22
4	Silmash Kolomyia	18	8	5	5	20	16	+4	21
5	Burevisnyk Ternopil	18	7	6	5	16	15	+1	20
6	Sluch Berezne	18	7	5	6	24	23	+1	19
7	Kombainobudivnyk Ternopil	18	9	1	8	23	23	0	19
8	Raduvanka Uzhhorod	18	4	2	12	22	26	−4	10
9	Kolos Luzhany	18	2	3	13	15	48	−33	7
10	Dynamo Uzhhorod	18	1	2	15	13	27	−14	4

Source: ukr-football.org.ua

=== Group 2 ===
Pos	Team	Pld	W	D	L	GF	GA	GD	Pts
1	Elektron Ivano-Frankivsk	20	13	4	3	34	11	+23	30
2	SKA Lviv	20	13	4	3	35	14	+21	30
3	Elektrovymiriuvach Zhytomyr	20	9	4	7	34	28	+6	22
4	Burevisnyk Kamianets-Podilskyi	20	8	5	7	28	22	+6	21
5	Arsenal Kyiv	20	9	3	8	22	21	+1	21
6	Torpedo Rivne	20	5	9	6	19	19	0	19
7	Silmash Kovel	20	8	3	9	30	32	−2	19
8	Prylad Mukachevo	20	6	6	8	24	28	−4	18
9	Torpedo Drohobych	20	5	6	9	20	27	−7	16
10	Kolos Zalishchyky	20	4	5	11	37	45	−8	13
11	Avanhard Vinnytsia	20	2	7	11	19	35	−16	11

Source: ukr-football.org.ua

=== Group 3 ===
Pos	Team	Pld	W	D	L	GF	GA	GD	Pts
1	Khimik Chernihiv	22	14	5	3	49	15	+34	33
2	Refryzherator Fastiv	20	12	3	5	28	17	+11	27
3	Bilshovyk Kyiv	20	11	4	5	29	10	+19	26
4	Lokomotyv Smila	20	10	5	5	16	21	−5	25
5	Promin Chernihiv	20	6	9	5	19	15	+4	21
6	Promin Poltava	20	5	9	6	27	22	+5	19
7	Vodnyk Mykolaiv	20	8	3	9	16	16	0	19
8	Zoria Uman	20	5	6	9	13	24	−11	16
9	Dnipro Cherkasy	20	4	4	12	20	37	−17	12
10	Dnipro Kremenchuk	20	3	6	11	12	39	−27	12
11	Shynnyk Bila Tserkva	20	4	2	14	17	50	−33	10

Source: ukr-football.org.ua

=== Group 4 ===
Pos	Team	Pld	W	D	L	GF	GA	GD	Pts
1	Tytan Armyansk	18	14	2	2	56	14	+42	30
2	Portovyk Illichivsk	0	-	-	-	-	-	—	0
3	Budivelnyk Henichesk	0	-	-	-	-	-	—	0
4	Radyst Kirovohrad	0	-	-	-	-	-	—	0
5	Shakhtar Oleksandriya	0	-	-	-	-	-	—	0
6	Enerhiya Nova Kakhovka	18	6	4	8	23	21	+2	16
7	Khvylia Mykolaiv	0	-	-	-	-	-	—	0
8	Budivelnyk Yalta	0	-	-	-	-	-	—	0
9	Okean Mykolaiv	0	-	-	-	-	-	—	0
10	Lokomotyv Znamianka	0	-	-	-	-	-	—	0

Source: ukr-football.org.ua

=== Group 5 ===
Pos	Team	Pld	W	D	L	GF	GA	GD	Pts
1	Metalurh Kupiansk	18	13	3	2	34	7	+27	29
2	Vikhr Dnipropetrovsk	18	13	3	2	26	7	+19	29
3	Kirovets Makiivka	18	8	6	4	24	14	+10	22
4	Avanhard Lozova	18	9	4	5	19	19	0	22
5	Khimik Sloviansk	18	7	4	7	24	23	+1	18
6	Transformator Zaporizhia	18	5	7	6	23	22	+1	17
7	Komunarets Komunarsk	18	5	5	8	21	19	+2	15
8	Khimik Rubizhne	18	5	1	12	18	33	−15	11
9	Metalurh Artemivsk	18	4	2	12	18	38	−20	10
10	Bliuminh Kramatorsk	18	2	3	13	9	34	−25	7

Source: ukr-football.org.ua

== Final ==
Pos	Team	Pld	W	D	L	GF	GA	GD	Pts
1	Khimik Chernihiv	4	3	1	0	6	3	+3	7
2	Tytan Armyansk	4	2	2	0	6	4	+2	6
3	Elektron Ivano-Frankivsk	4	2	1	1	7	5	+2	5
4	Sokil Lviv	4	1	0	3	5	7	−2	2
5	Metalurh Kupyansk	4	0	0	4	3	8	−5	0

Source: ukr-football.org.ua
