= List of monuments and memorials of the Soviet Union =

The following list includes monuments and memorials built in or by the Soviet Union.

- 26 Commissars Memorial
- Alyosha Monument, Murmansk
- Barmaley Fountain
- Bronze Soldier of Tallinn
- Chekhov Monument in Taganrog
- Cosmonauts Alley
- Defence Forces Cemetery of Tallinn
- Garibaldi Monument in Taganrog
- Green Belt of Glory
- Katyn war cemetery
- Khimki War Memorial
- Leningrad Hero City Obelisk
- Liberty Statue (Budapest)
- Mamayev Kurgan
- Memorial Museum of Cosmonautics
- Memorial to Polish Soldiers and German Anti-Fascists
- Memorial to the Victims of the Deportation of 1944
- Monument to the Conquerors of Space
- Monument to the Liberators of Soviet Latvia and Riga from the German Fascist Invaders
- Monument to the Liberator Soldier (Kharkiv)
- Monument to the Revolution of 1905
- Monument to the Soviet Army, Sofia
- Mother Armenia
- Mother Armenia, Gyumri
- Mother Motherland, Kiev
- The Motherland Calls
- Mound of Glory
- Mound of Immortality
- Museum of The History of Ukraine in World War II
- Nizami Mausoleum
- Poklonnaya Hill
- Piskaryovskoye Memorial Cemetery
- Robespierre Monument
- Sardarapat Memorial
- Shtyki Memorial
- Slavín
- Soviet Military Cemetery, Warsaw
- Soviet War Memorial (Schönholzer Heide)
- Soviet War Memorial (Tiergarten)
- Soviet War Memorial (Treptower Park)
- Soviet War Memorial (Vienna)
- Memorial of Glory (Tiraspol)
- Monument to Soviet Tank Crews
- To Donbas Liberators
- Tomb of the Unknown Soldier (Moscow)
- Tsitsernakaberd
- Vagif Mausoleum
- Victory Monument in Netanya
- Victory Monument (Tolyatti)
- Victory Park, Dushanbe
- Victory Park (Tolyatti)
- Victory Square, Bishkek
- Victory Square, Saint Petersburg
- Victory Square (Vitebsk)

== See also ==
- Personifications of Russia § Statues
- Propaganda in the Soviet Union
