= List of Soviet war memorials =

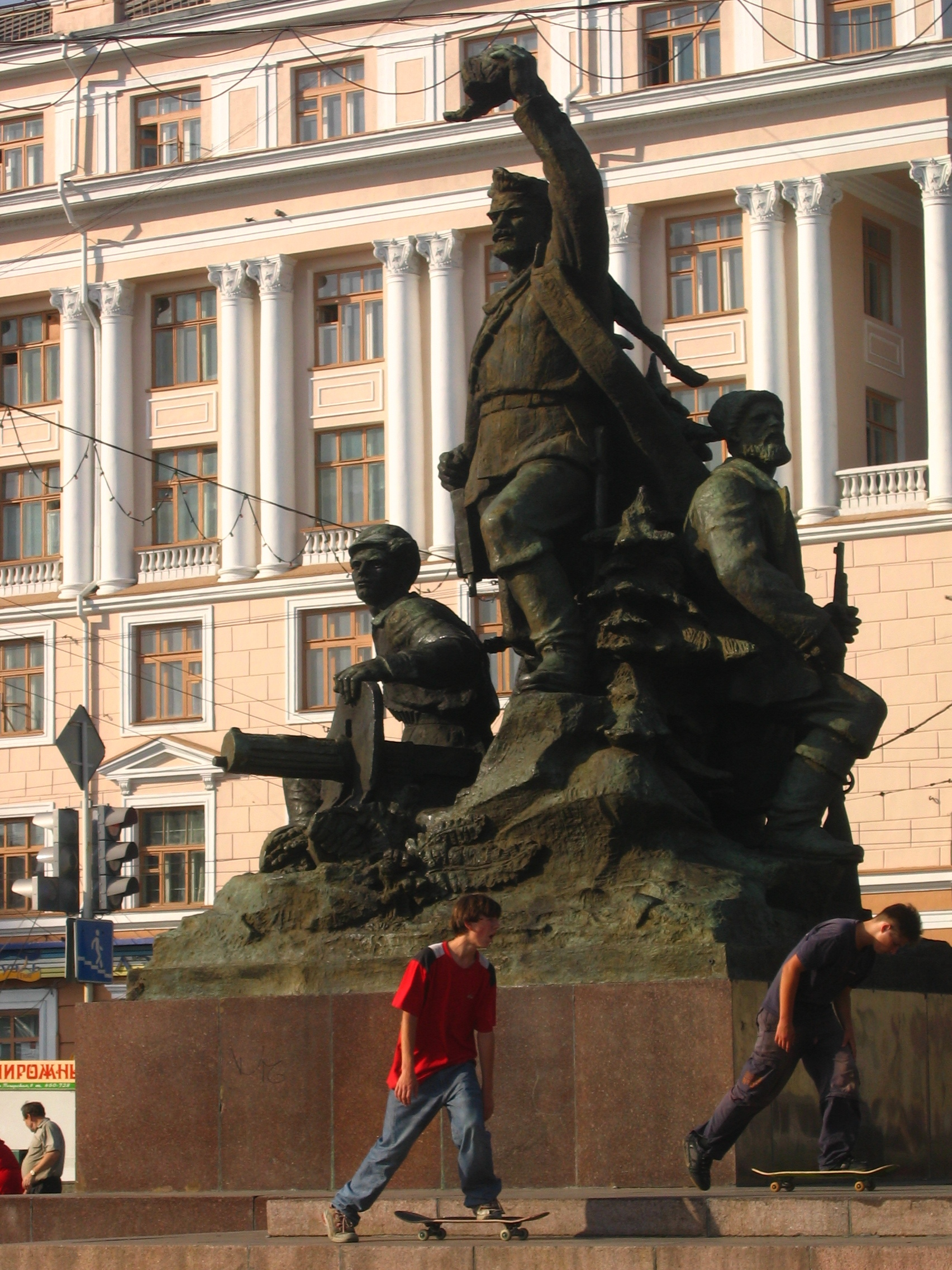
A memorial to the fighters for the Soviet Power in the Far East (Vladivostok, Russia, 2004)

Soviet war memorials are memorials commemorating the activities of Soviet Armed Forces in any of the wars involving Soviet Union, but most notably World War II. After the dissolution of the Soviet Union and the 2022 Russian invasion of Ukraine, many of the memorials, especially the ones dedicated to the activities of Soviet Armed Forces in former Soviet Bloc countries during World War II, have been removed, relocated, altered or have had their meaning reinterpreted (such as the Liberty Statue in Budapest).

== Austria ==
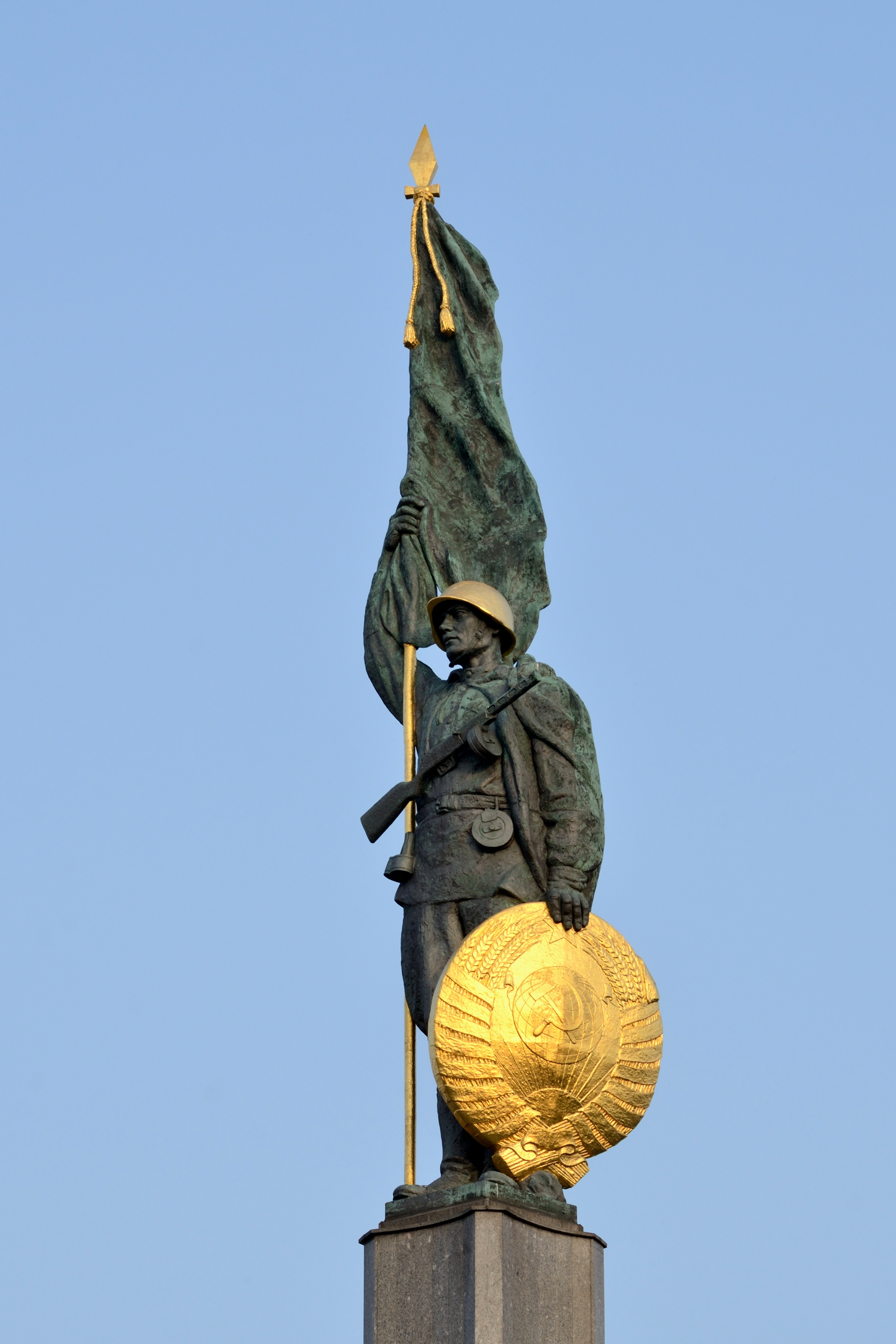
Soviet War Memorial in Vienna

- Soviet War Memorial (Vienna)
- Victory Monument to the Red Army
- Soviet War Graves at Zentralfriedhof (Vienna)

== Belarus ==
- Minsk Hero City Obelisk
- Victory Square, Minsk
- Mound of Glory, Minsk
- Brest Hero Fortress
- Khatyn Memorial
- Victory Square (Vitebsk)

== Bulgaria ==
- Alyosha Monument, Plovdiv
- Monument to the Soviet Army, Sofia
- Monument to the Fallen Soviet Pilots, Byala Slatina

== Cuba ==
- Memorial to the Soviet Internationalist Soldier, Havana

== China ==
- Monument to the Soviet Army Martyrs, Changchun
- Soviet Red Army Monument, Harbin
- Monument to the Soviet Back Baikal Tank Battalion Soldiers, Shengyang
- Monument to the Soviet Army Martyrs in the Lüshun Russian Military Cemetery

== Czech Republic ==
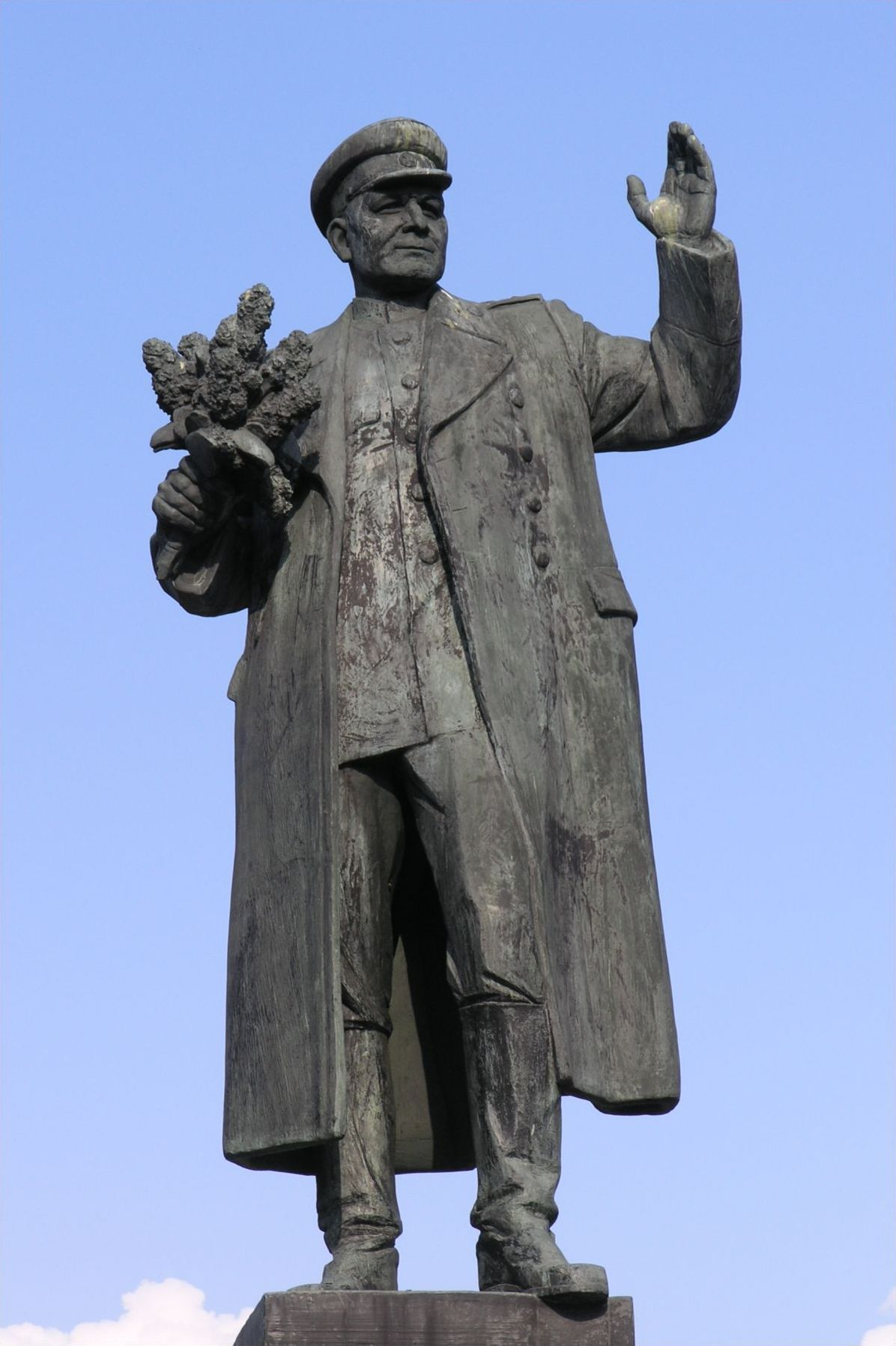
Statue of Ivan Konev

- Monument to Soviet Tank Crews (first painted, later removed)
- Statue of Ivan Konev (removed in 2020)
- Monument to the Liberation of the City by the Red Army in Hradec Králové (removed in 1991)
- Monument to the Red Army soldiers in Luková
- Red Army Memorial (Olomouc)
- Red Army Statue (Adamov)
- Red Army Statue (Keblice)
- Red Army Statue (Šlapanice)

== Germany ==
- Soviet War Memorial (Treptower Park), a memorial in Treptower Park, Berlin
- Soviet War Memorial (Seelow Heights), a memorial in Seelow Heights, Brandenburg
- Soviet War Memorial (Tiergarten), a memorial in Tiergarten, Berlin
- Soviet War Memorial (Schönholzer Heide), a memorial in Schönholzer Heide, Berlin

== Estonia ==
- Bronze Soldier of Tallinn (relocated to Tallinn Military Cemetery in 2007)
- Monument to the Red Army soldiers who died during the Second World War in Narva (removed in 2022)
- Narva tank (removed in 2022)
- Rakvere Brotherly Grave Monument (removed in 2022)
- Soldiers' Memorial in Osmussaari (removed in 2023)

== Hungary ==
- Liberty Statue (Budapest), the Soviet inscription has been replaced
- Liberty Square (Budapest)
- Hungarian-Soviet Friendship Memorial, now in Memento Park
- Soviet War Memorial (Debrecen)

== Kyrgyzstan ==
- Victory Square, Bishkek

== Lithuania ==
Memorial of Red Army soldiers in Antakalnis Cemetery, Vilnius (removed in 2022)

== Latvia ==
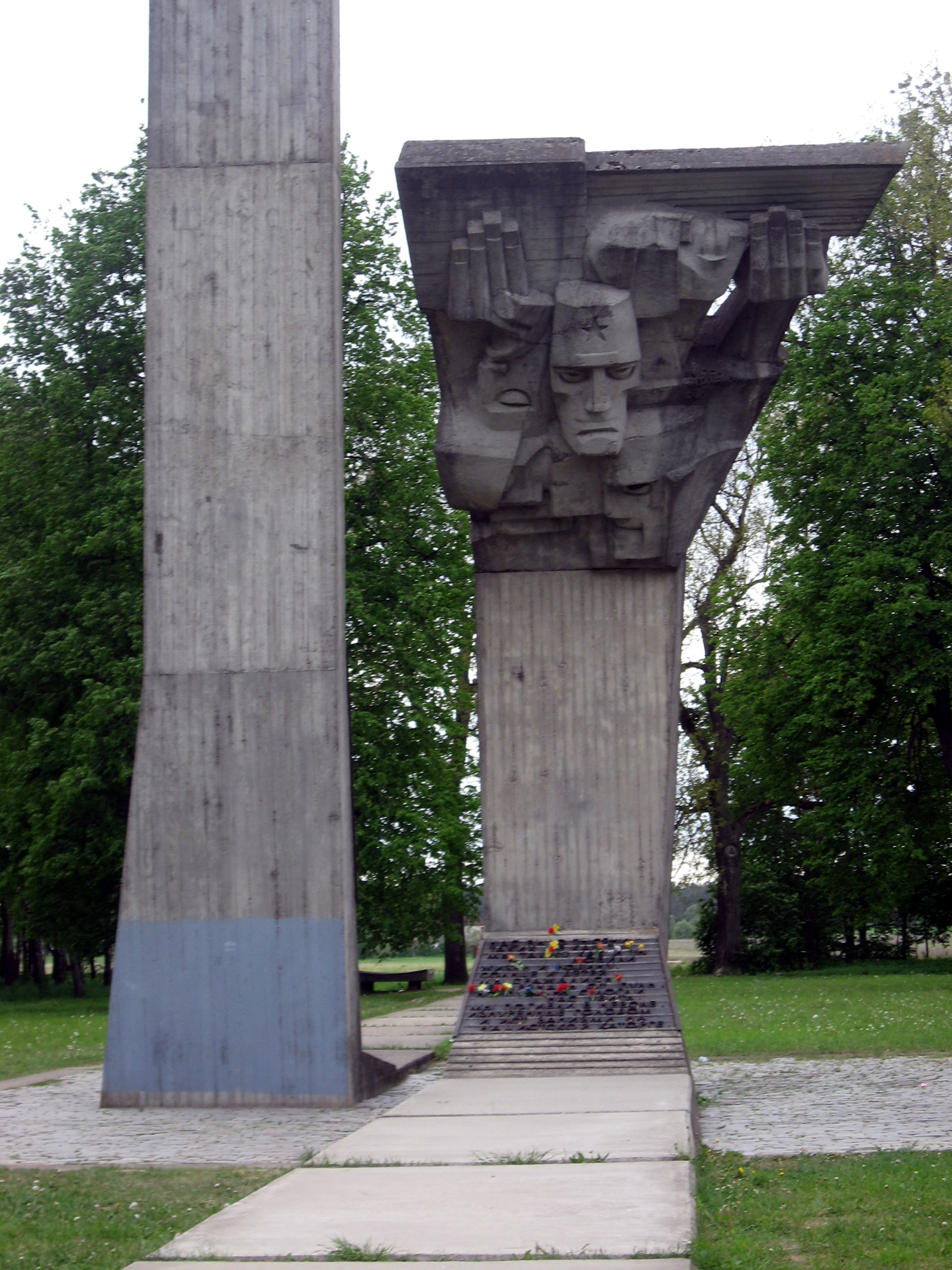
Monument to the Soviet Prisoners of War in Salaspils

- Monument to the Liberators of Soviet Latvia and Riga from the German Fascist Invaders (removed in 2022)
- Monument to the Soviet Prisoners of War in Salaspils
- Memorial to the Fallen Soviet Soldiers in Jēkabpils
- Monument to Latvian Riflemen

== Mongolia ==
- Zaisan Memorial, Ulaanbaatar

== North Korea ==
- Liberation Monument, Pyongyang

== Norway ==
- Monument to Red Army Liberators, Roald Amundsens gate, Kirkenes

== Poland ==
After 2017, Poland's Law and Justice (PiS) government destroyed most of the Soviet War Memorials in Poland.

- Cemetery of the Soviet Army Soldiers in Braniewo
- Monument to Brotherhood in Arms, Warsaw (removed in 2011)
- Monument of Gratitude to the Soldiers of the Red Army In Warsaw (removed in 2018)
- Monument of Gratitude to the Red Army in Buczkowice (removed in 2018)
- Monument of Gratitude to the Red Army in Bobolice (removed in 2022)
- Monument "To the Destroyers of Hitlerism" (removed in 2019)
- Monument in Honor of the Red Army in Chrzowice (removed in 2022)
- Monument of Gratitude and Brotherhood of the Soviet Army and the Polish Army in Ciechocinek (removed in 2014)
- Monument of Gratitude in Dąbrowa Górnicza (removed in 2018)
- Monument of Gratitude to the Soviet Army in Szczecin (removed in 2017)
- Soviet Military Cemetery, Warsaw

== Serbia ==
- Monument to Soviet War Veterans, Avala, Belgrade

== Tajikistan ==
- Victory Park, Dushanbe

== Ukraine ==
- Mother Ukraine, Kyiv (modified in 2023)
- Tomb of the Unknown Soldier, Kyiv
- Hero City monument, Kyiv (modified in 2023)
- Afghanistan War Memorial, Kyiv
- Nikolai Vatutin monument, Kyiv (removed in 2023)
- Monument to the Liberator Soldier, Kharkiv (destroyed in 2022)
- Monument to the Unknown Sailor, Odesa
- Monument to Soldiers Liberators, Chernihiv
- To Donbas Liberators, Donetsk

== Other ==
Joseph Stalin is still quoted in stone in German and Russian at least in Treptow and Vienna. Such inscriptions have been generally removed in Soviet Union and Soviet bloc countries as part of de-Stalinization.

A Soviet war memorial was erected in Plummer Park, West Hollywood, California in 2005. The memorial depicts cranes in flight, a reference to a popular Russian-language song by Rasul Gamzatov. A refrain from the song is shown in both English and Russian. A granite slab bears the inscription "dedicated in honor of and in tribute to the World War II veterans from the former Soviet Union" in English. West Hollywood is the center of a large Russian-speaking community from the former Soviet Union.
