= Soviet War Memorials in Romania =

Memorials to Soviet Union's role in World War II

Soviet War Memorials in Romania commemorate the role of the Soviet Union in World War II.

Following the war, hundreds of such memorials were built and inscribed in honor of the Red Army soldiers participating in the capture of Romania. They are protected by a 2003 law guaranteeing the integrity of graves and war memorials. As of 2026, Romania had 180 Red Army monuments in 145 places, as well as 233 cemeteries for Soviet soldiers.

== List ==
Location	Image
Adjud	
Alba Iulia	
Buzău	
Câmpulung	
Constanța	
Fălticeni	
Focșani	
Hârlău	
Medgidia	
Miercurea Ciuc	
Pașcani	
Roman	
Sighetu Marmației	
Suceava	
Timișoara	
Vlădeni, Brașov	
