= Lokomotyv Stadium =

Lokomotyv Stadium is a name of several stadiums in Ukraine.

- Lokomotyv stadium (Chernihiv), a stadium in Chernihiv
- Lokomotyv Stadium (Poltava), a stadium in Poltava
- Lokomotyv Republican Sports Complex, a stadium in Simferopol
- Lokomotyv Stadium, a stadium in Korosten
- Lokomotyv Stadium, former name of Hirka Stadium in Ivano-Frankivsk
- Lokomotyv Stadium, former name of Tsentralnyi Stadion (Vinnytsia) in Vinnytsia
