= Victory Square, Chernihiv =

Square in Chernihiv, Ukraine

Victory Square
- Площа Перемоги
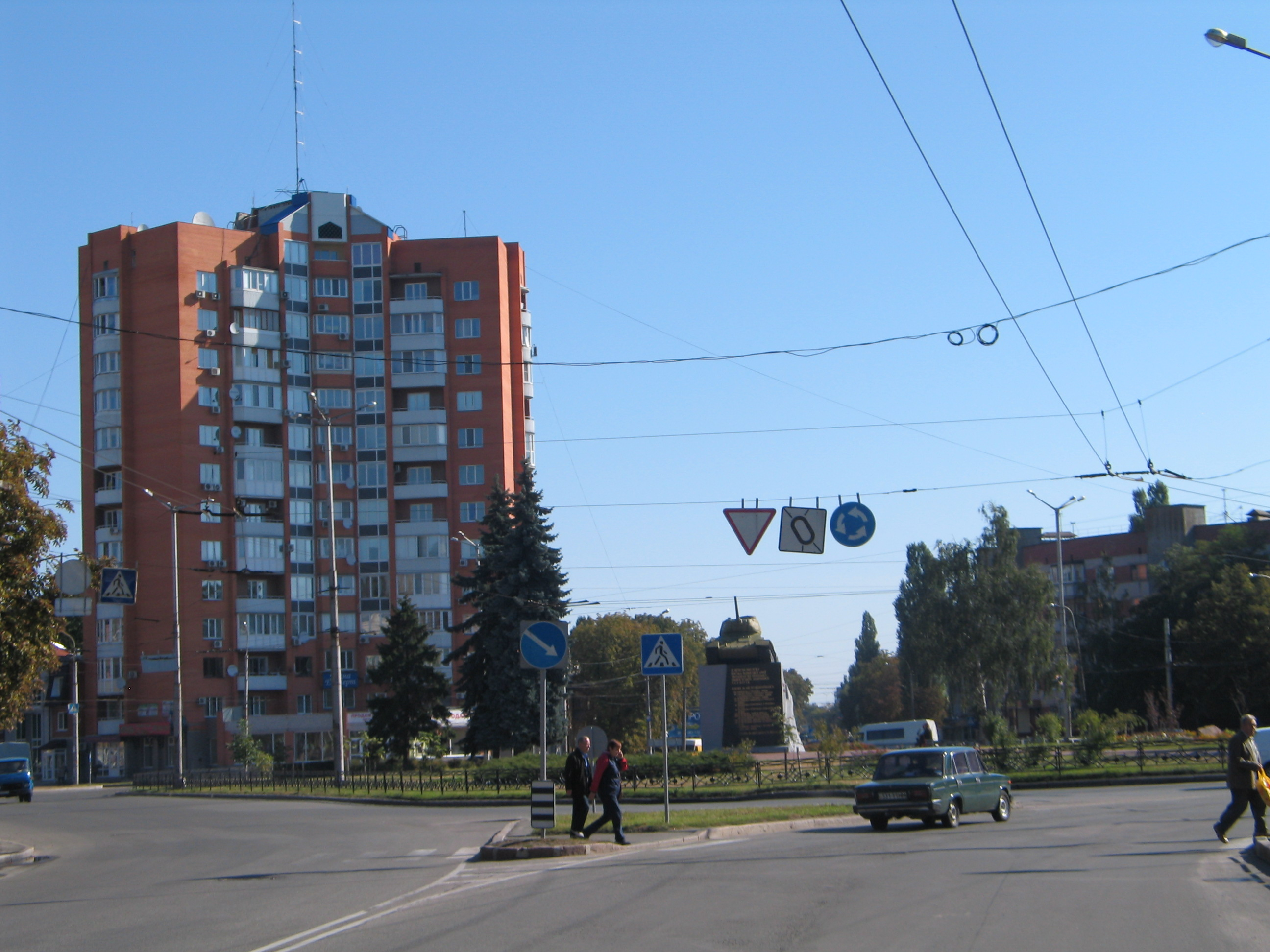
- Interactive map of Victory Square
- Native name: Площа Перемоги (Ukrainian)
- Former name: Victory Square
- Type: Square
- Location: Novozavodskyi District, Chernihiv, Ukraine
- Coordinates: 51°29′13″N 31°16′30″E

Victory Square (Ukrainian: Площа Перемоги) is a square in the Novozavodskyi District of Chernihiv at the intersection of Victory Avenue and Ivan Mazepa Street.

== History ==
The square was formed after the Great Patriotic War and is called by its modern name in honor of the victory of the Red Army and the Soviet people over Nazi Germany in the Great Patriotic War of 1941–1945. In 1968, in the center of the square in honor of the 25th anniversary of the liberation of the city, a memorial sign was erected in honor of the Monument to Soldiers Liberators. In September 2018 they repaired the road surface on Victory Square (in the center of which is a post with a T-34 tank – a memorial sign in honor of the development of Chernihiv).

== Description ==
Traffic is not regulated by traffic lights. A public garden is laid out on the square – a protected zone for a historical monument of local significance. There is a memorial in honor of Soviet soldiers-liberators, which is a tank on a pedestal. The sections of Pobeda Avenue and Ivan Mazepa Street adjacent to the square are occupied by multi-storey residential buildings (mainly five, eight and fifteen-storey residential buildings).

== Transport ==
The main Chernihiv–Ovruch railway is located nearby and bus routes number 1, 3, 4, 5, and 7 have two stops: Ploshchad Pobedy on Pobedy Avenue and Ivan Mazepa Street.

== Gallery ==
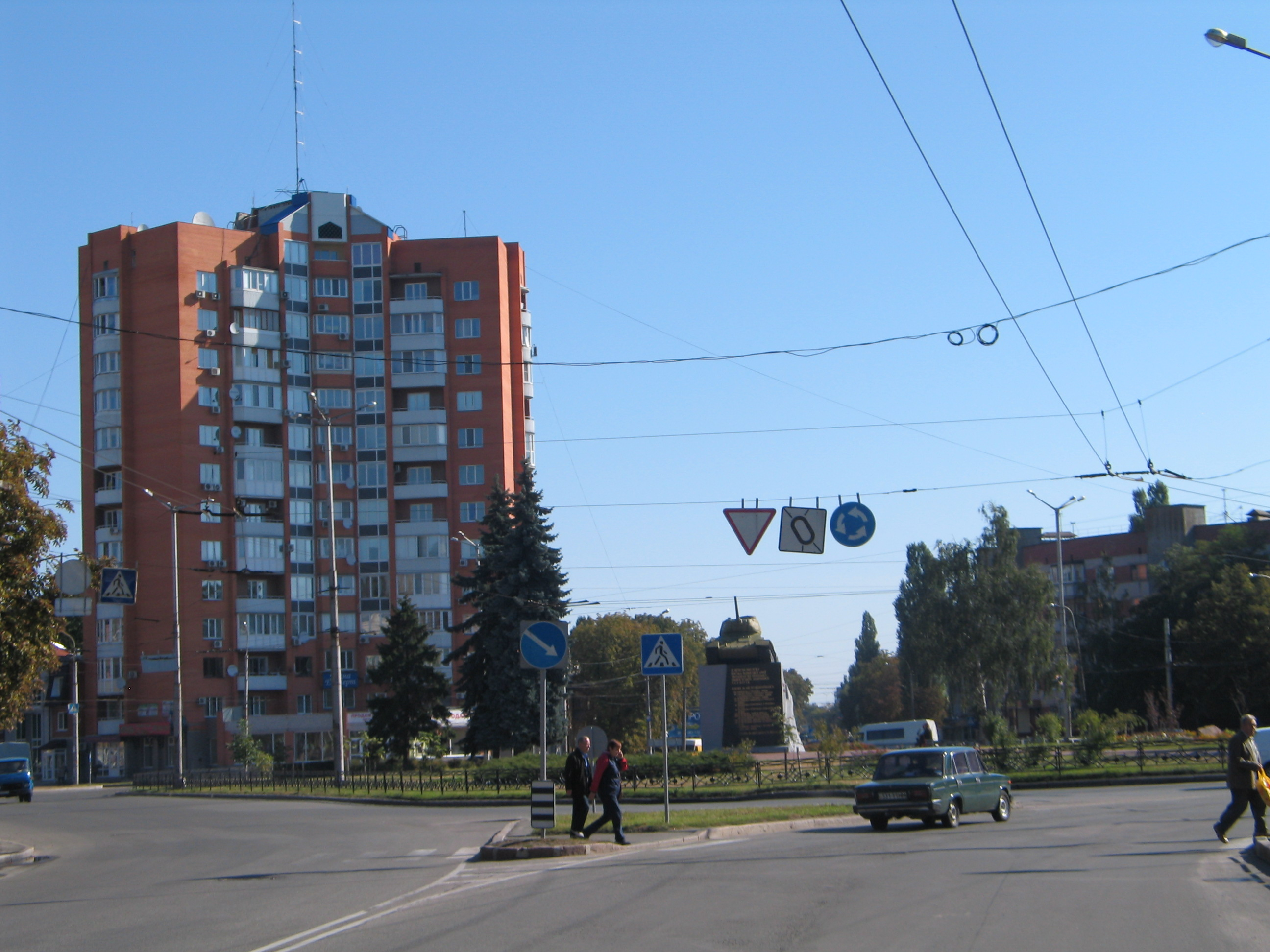
View of Victory Square with the Monument to Soldiers Liberators

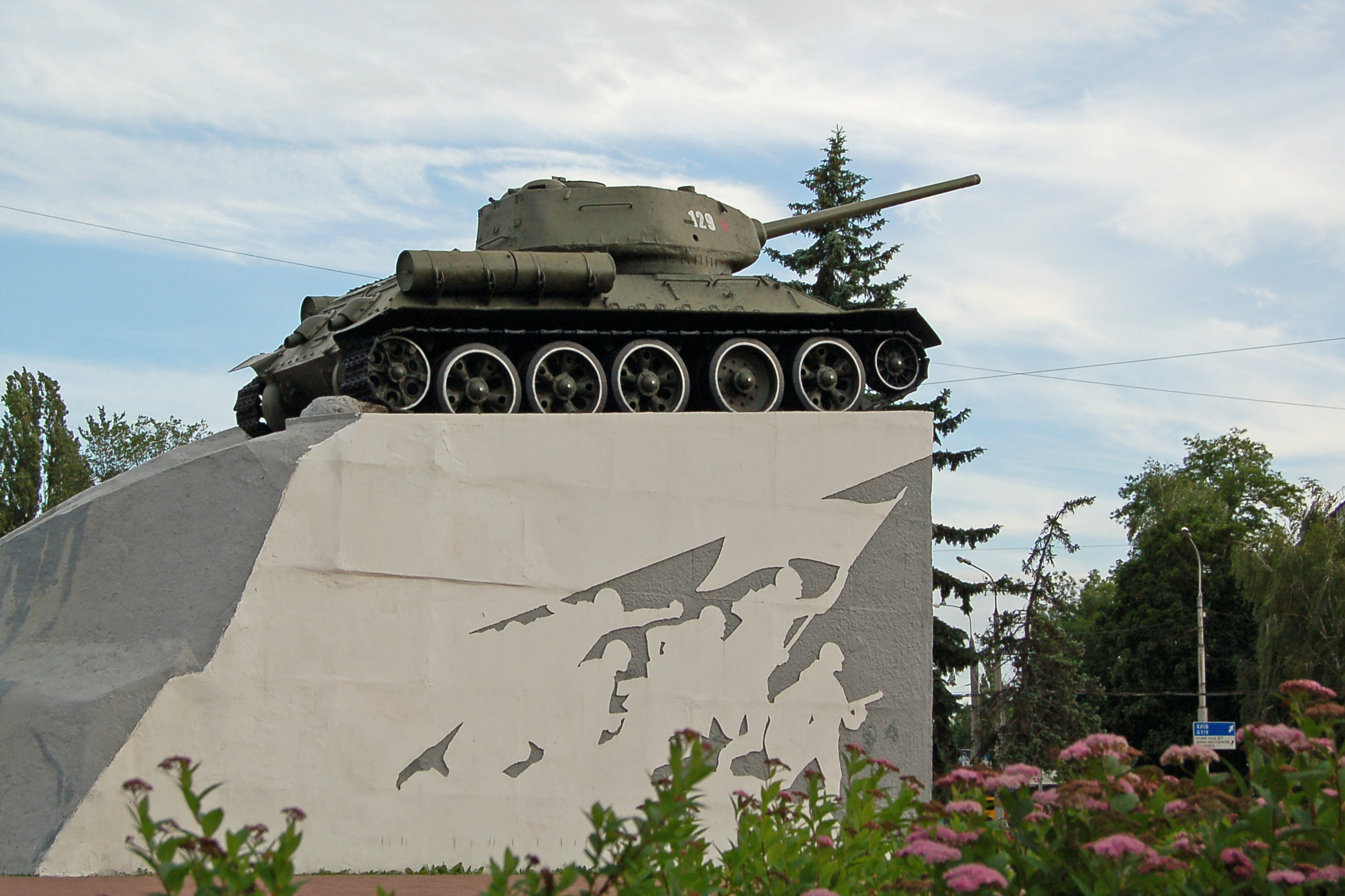
Memorial sign in honor of Soviet liberators, Chernihiv, the intersection of st. Mazepa and Victory Avenue

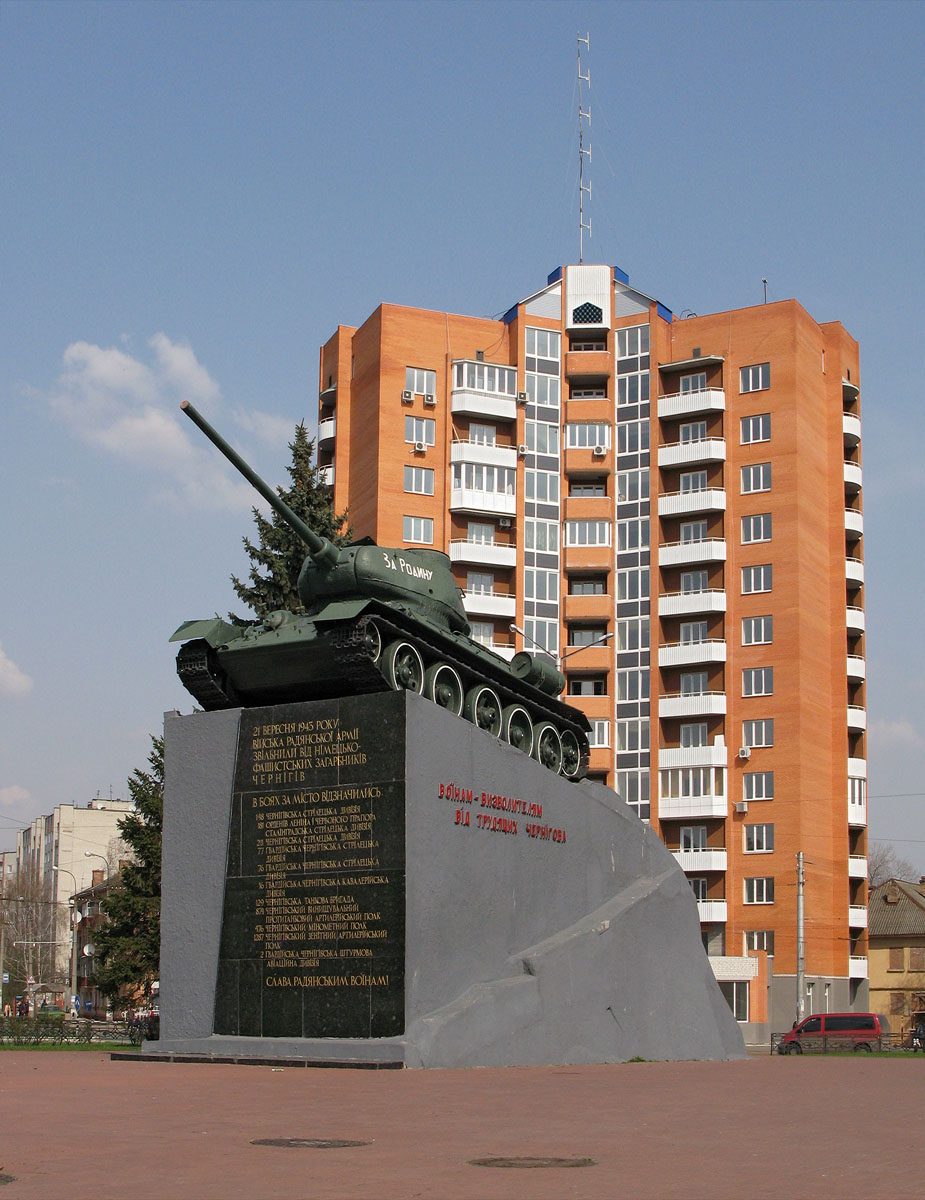

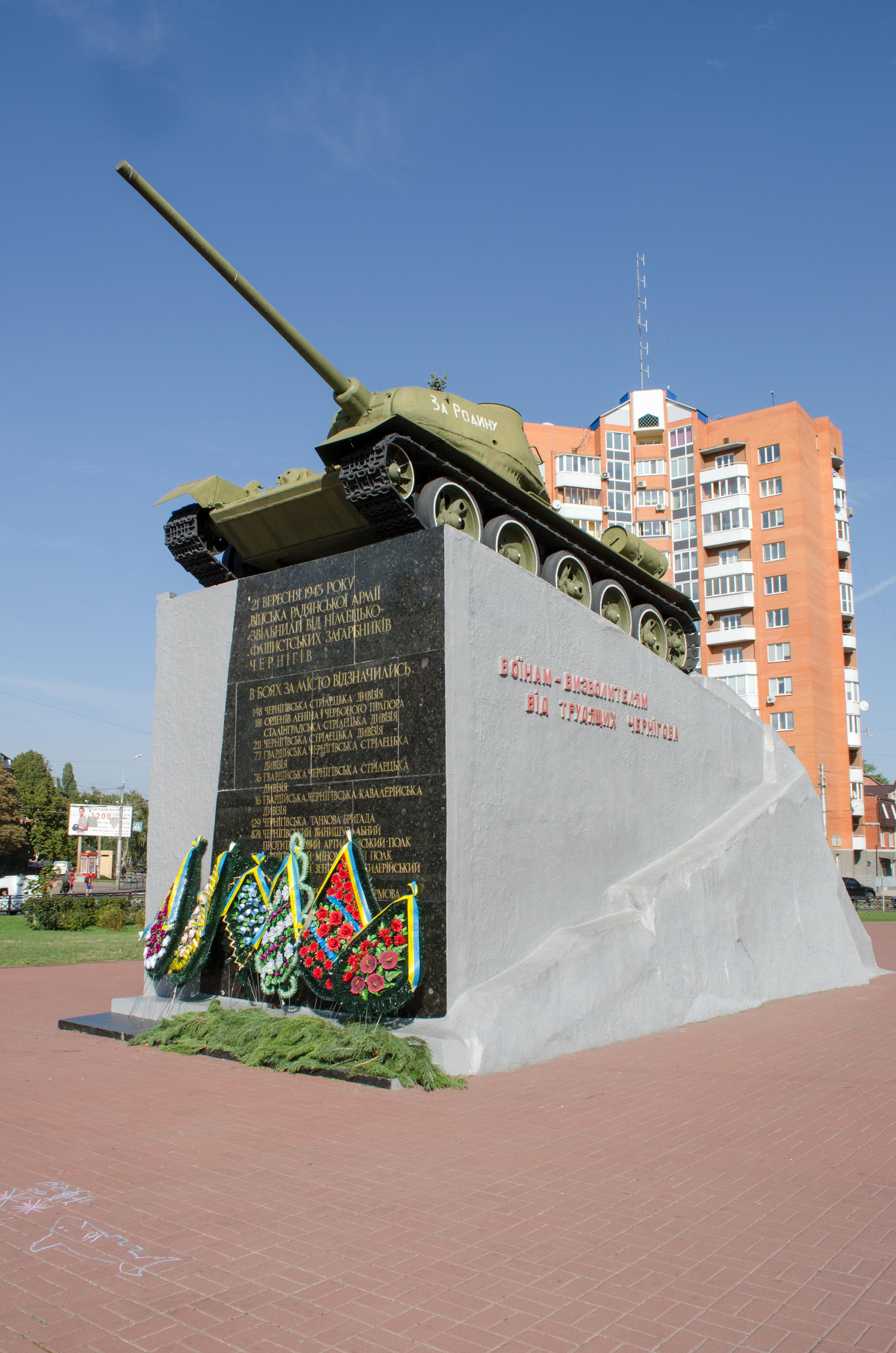

== See also ==
- List of streets and squares in Chernihiv
