= Lokomotyv stadium (Chernihiv) =

Stadium in Chernihiv, Ukraine

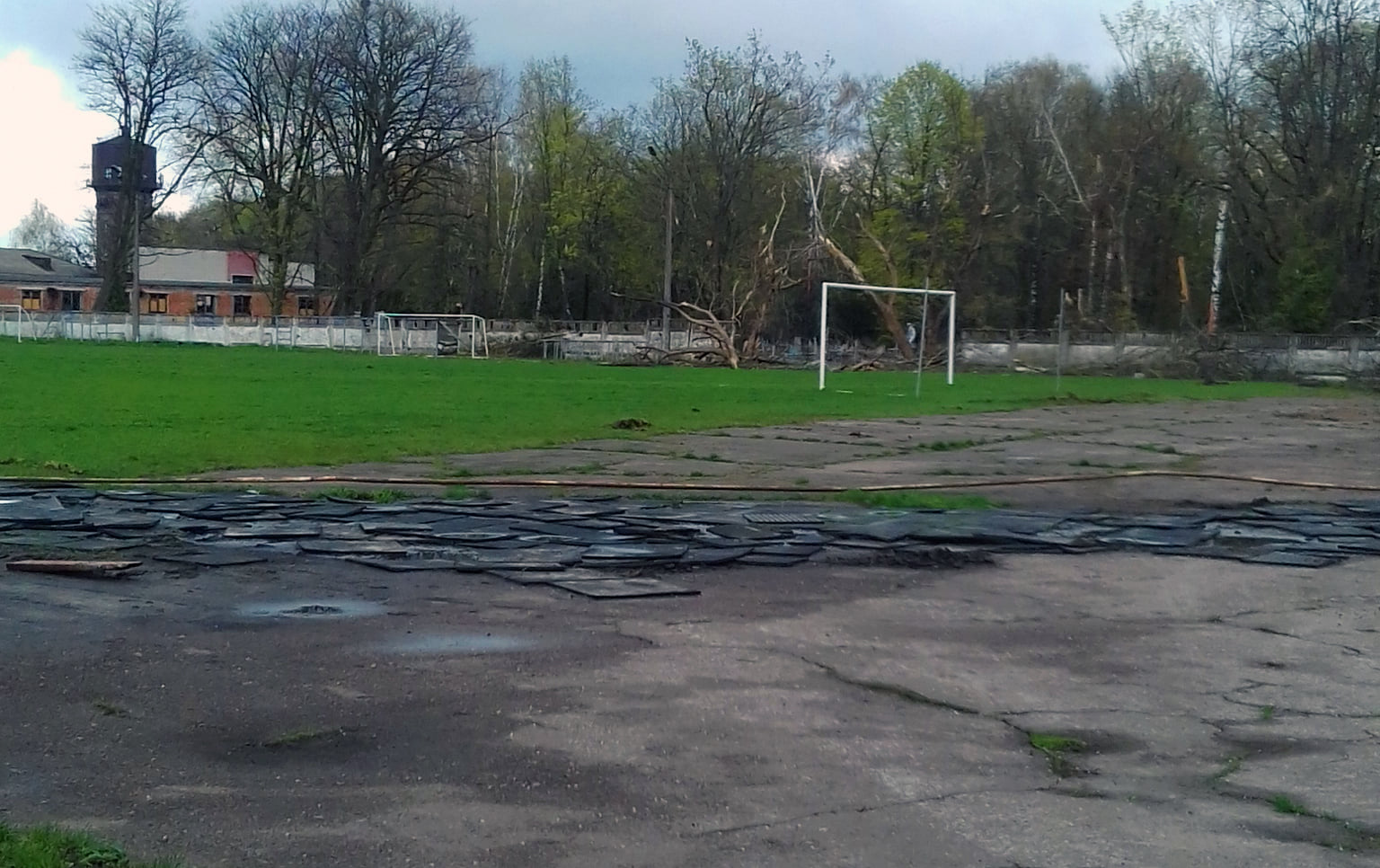
- Interactive map of Lokomotyv stadium
- Location: vulytsia Zhabynskoho, 19 Chernihiv, Ukraine, 16624
- Coordinates: 51°29′33″N 31°16′9″E
- Surface: soil
- Field size: 105x68

Construction
- Opened: 1950
- Renovated: 2016

Tenants
- WFC Lehenda-ShVSM Chernihiv; Spartak ShVSM Chernihiv; Desna Chernihiv; FC Chernihiv; Desna Chernihiv U14; Desna Chernihiv U19; Desna Chernihiv U21

Lokomotiv stadium (Ukrainian: стадіон Локомотив) is a football stadium in Chernihiv. The stadium is located close to the Chernihiv–Ovruch railway and the Monument to Soldiers Liberators in Victory Square. Nearby, there are also the Khimik Sports Complex and Tekstylschyk stadium. There is a "tribune" of a row of six or seven wooden benches, where the local youth hang out for beer and seeds in the evening.

== History ==
=== Reconstruction ===
After years of the stadium having been in a dilapidated state, by 2016, a reconstruction plan had been put in place. In 2017 the city of Chernihiv wanted to reconstruct the stadium "Locomotive" and planned to spend 14 million Ukrainian hryvnias (₴) from the city budget on the reconstruction of Lokomotiv stadium. In 2017, the mayor, Vladyslav Atroshenko, in turn announced a project for the reconstruction of the Lokomotiv Stadium on Zhabynskoho Street. Its cost is at least ₴70 million. He said that the city has already three stadiums, the main one Gagarin Stadium. The second is the Yunist Stadium and the third stadium is private, Chernihiv Arena at ZAZ. In 2019, the stadium was included in the list of facilities to be financed by the State Fund for Regional Development. Its user will be the municipal after-school educational institution "Specialized School for Children and Youth of the Desna Olympic Football Reserve" of the Chernihiv City Council. In November 2021, the stadium hosted the "New York Marathon That No One Wants to Run," organized by Nova Poshta.

=== Impact of the Russo–Ukrainian war ===
The Russo–Ukrainian war has resulted in damage on the stadium. It suffered during the battles for Chernihiv in February–April 2022. In particular, the fence of the stadium after the shelling by the Russian occupiers and the stands were damaged.

== Usage ==
The stadium was used for the home matches of Desna Chernihiv in the Ukrainian Amateur Football Championship. It was used also for WFC Lehenda-ShVSM Chernihiv and Spartak ShVSM Chernihiv the female teams in Chernihiv. The stadium was used for Desna Chernihiv U14, Desna Chernihiv U19 and Desna Chernihiv U21 as the training ground

== Gallery ==
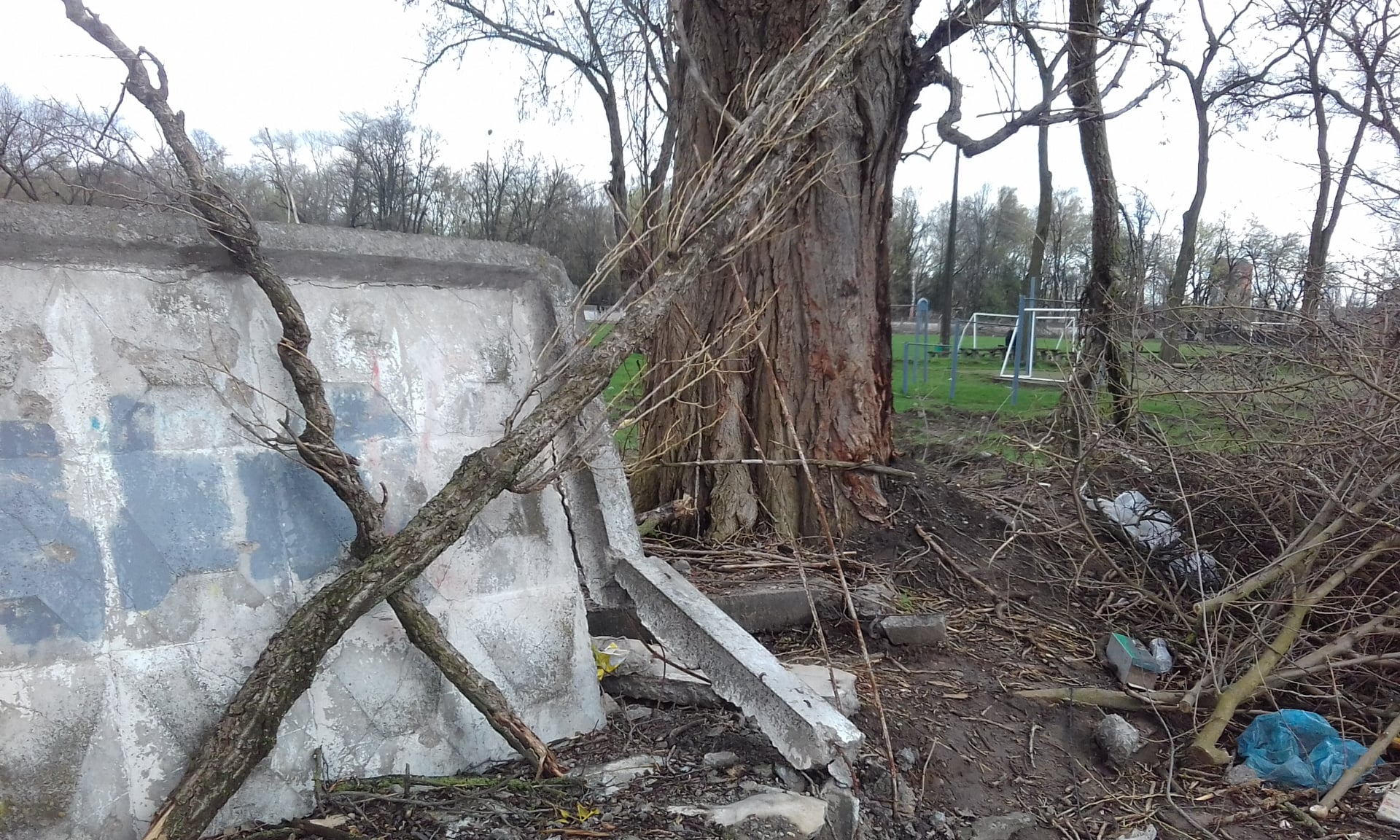
The fence of the stadium after the shelling by the Russian occupiers. Chernihiv. April 26, 2022

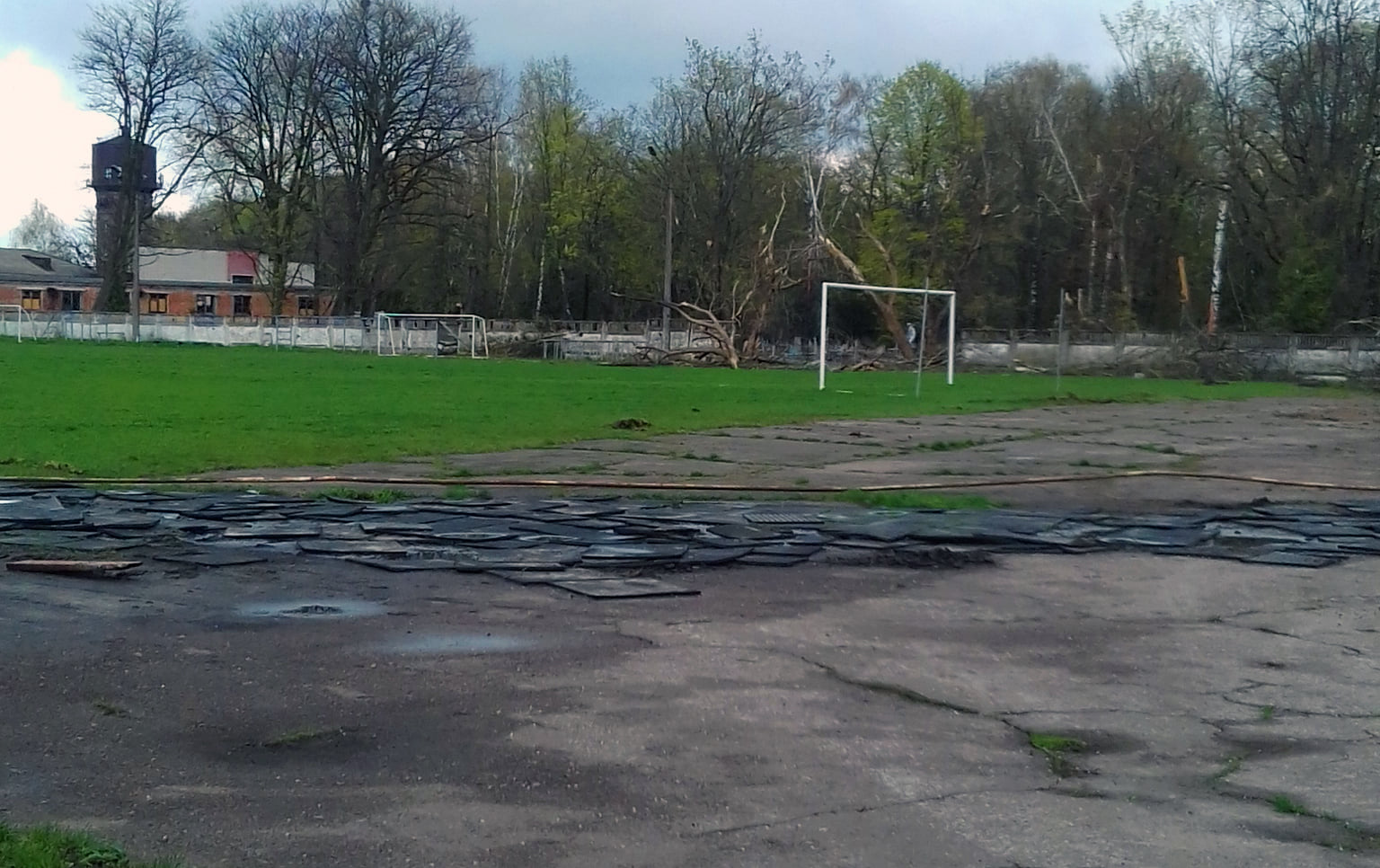
View of the Lokomotiv Stadium in Chernihiv

== See also ==
- List of sports venues in Chernihiv
