= Monument to Soldiers Liberators (Chernihiv) =

Monument in Chernihiv, Ukraine

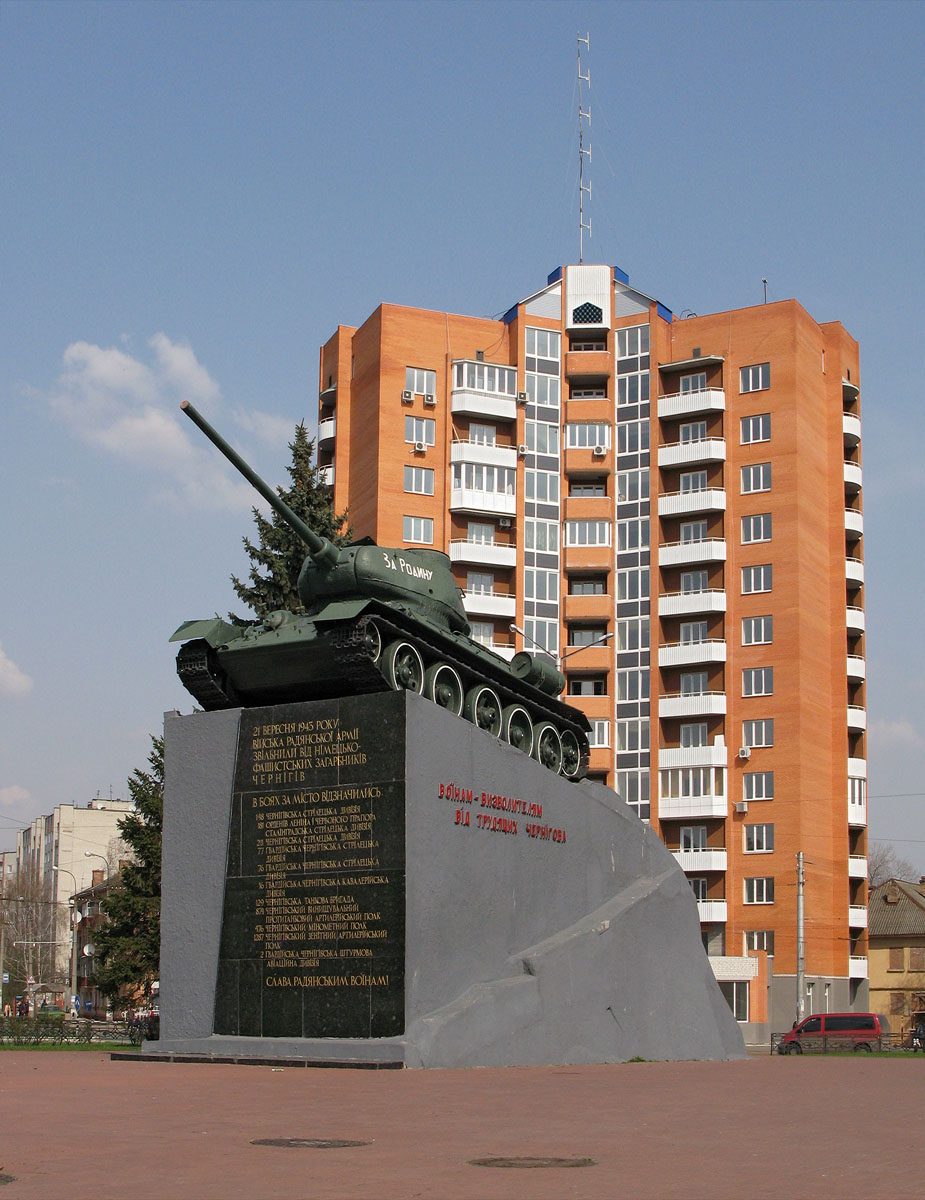
- Interactive map of the Monument to Soldiers Liberators area

General information
- Location: Victory Square Chernihiv, Ukraine
- Coordinates: 51°29′13″N 31°16′30″E
- Inaugurated: 1968

Monument to Soldiers Liberators (Ukrainian: Пам'ятник воїнам-визволителям, romanized: Pamiatnyk voinam-vyzvolyteliam) is located in Chernihiv, Ukraine, in Victory Square in front of Chernihiv–Ovruch railway and nearby Lokomotiv stadium.

== History ==
It was erected in 1968 and it is a tank mounted on a granite pedestal, divisions that took part in the battles for the liberation of the city are embossed in gold letters. The main element of the composition is the legendary T-34 tank - a Soviet medium tank during the Great Patriotic War, the most massive medium tank of the Second World War. Combat vehicles of this series were the first to break into Chernigov, occupied by the Nazis. There are legends in the city about the tank installed on the Circle:

1. This is the first tank to break into Chernihiv.
2. The inscription "For the Motherland!" on the left side of the tower - during the Great Patriotic War, it was found under layers of paint.
3. If you fill in the solarium and put the batteries in, the tank will go.
4. The tank is not securely closed, homeless people were sleeping in it

== Gallery ==
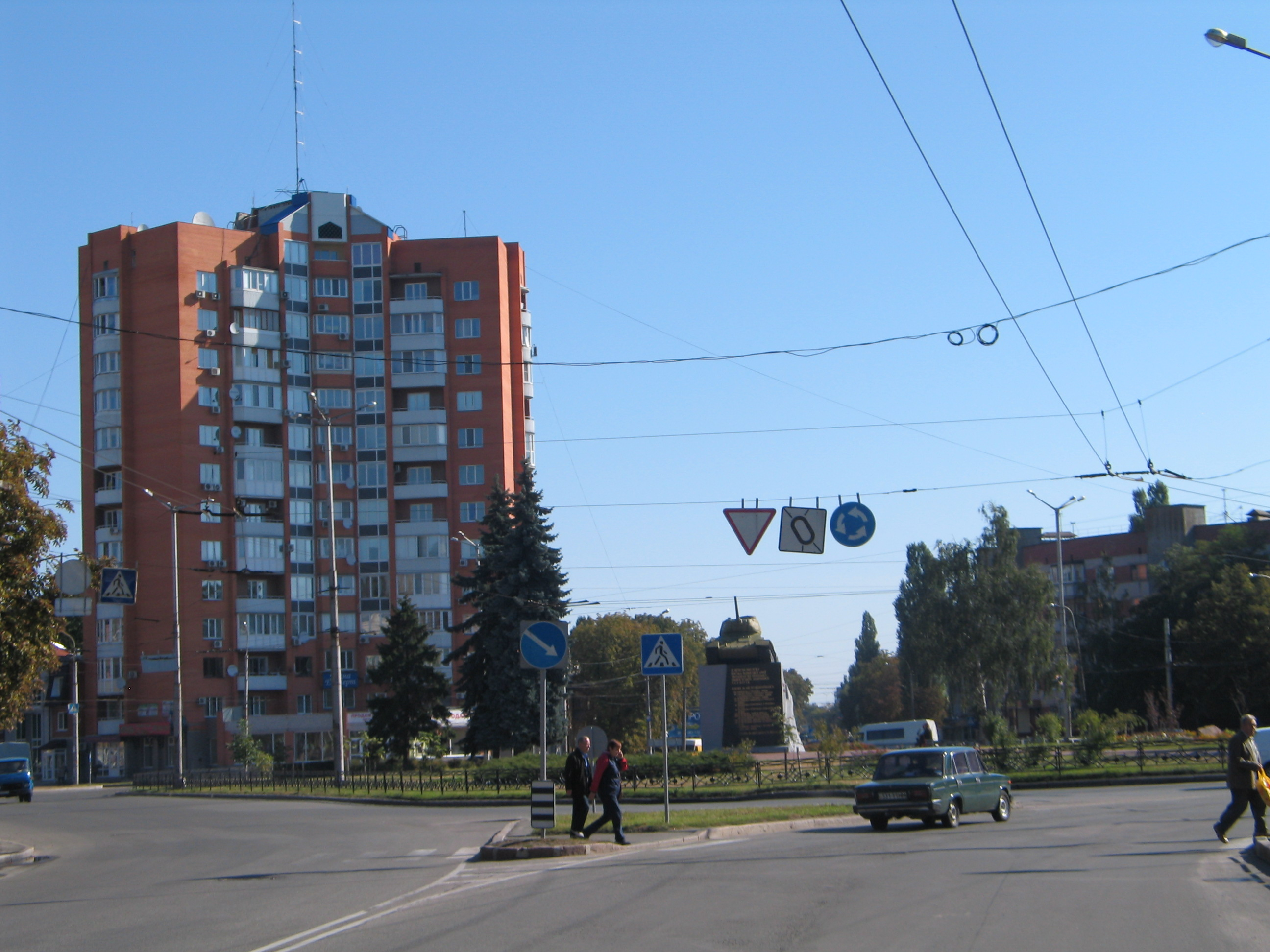
View of Victory Square with the Monument to Soldiers Liberators

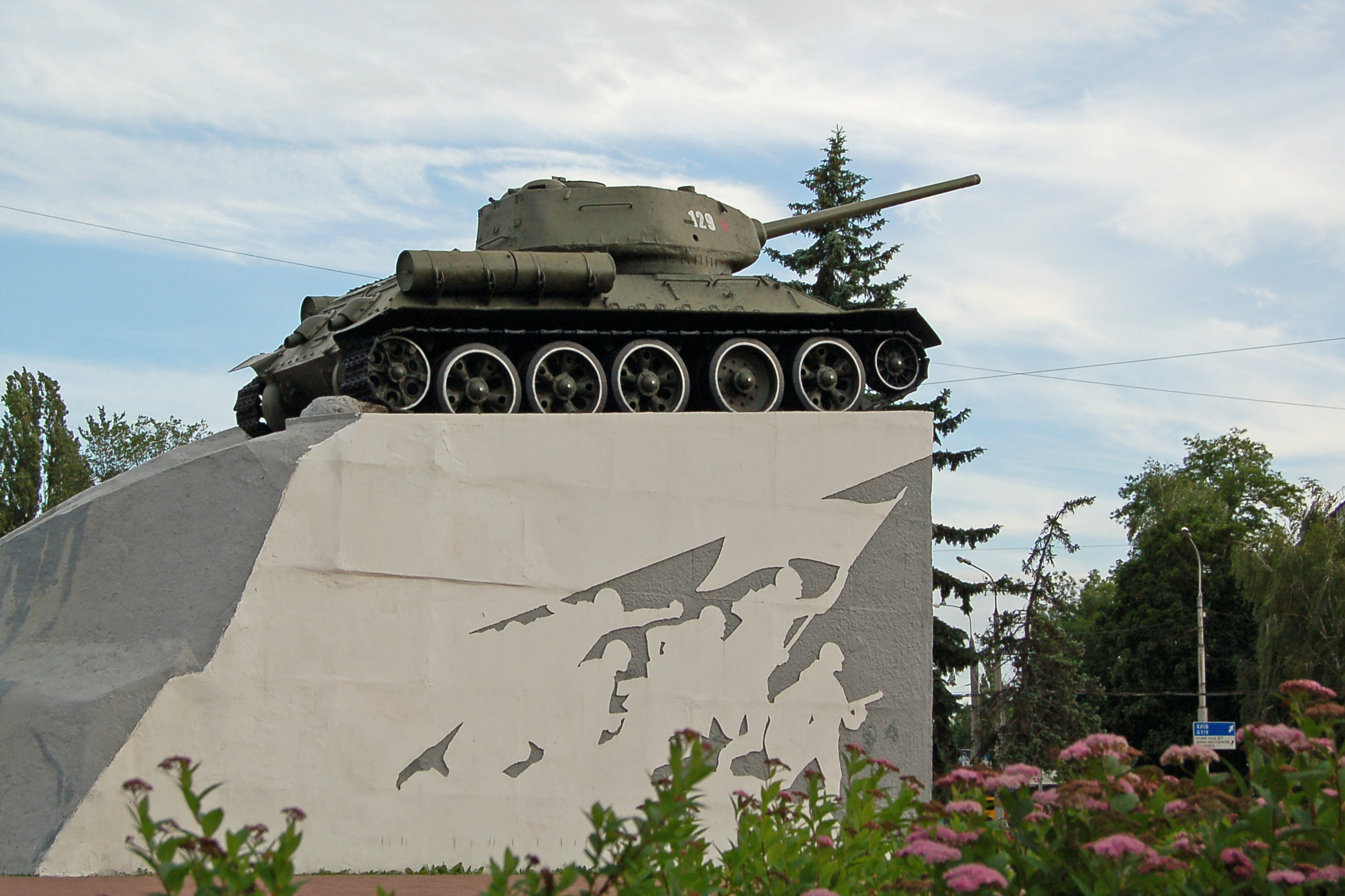
Memorial sign in honor of Soviet liberators, Chernihiv, the intersection of st. Mazepa and Victory Avenue

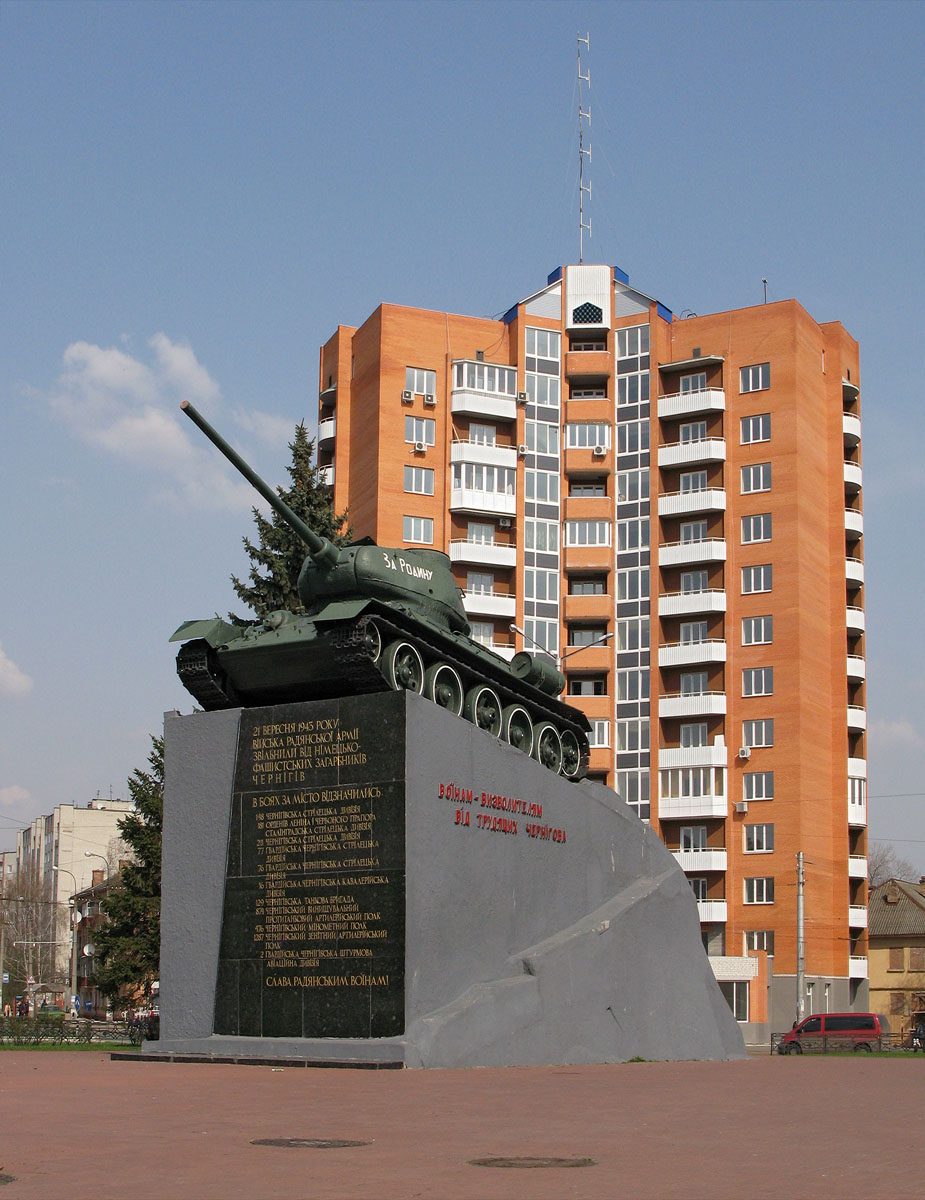

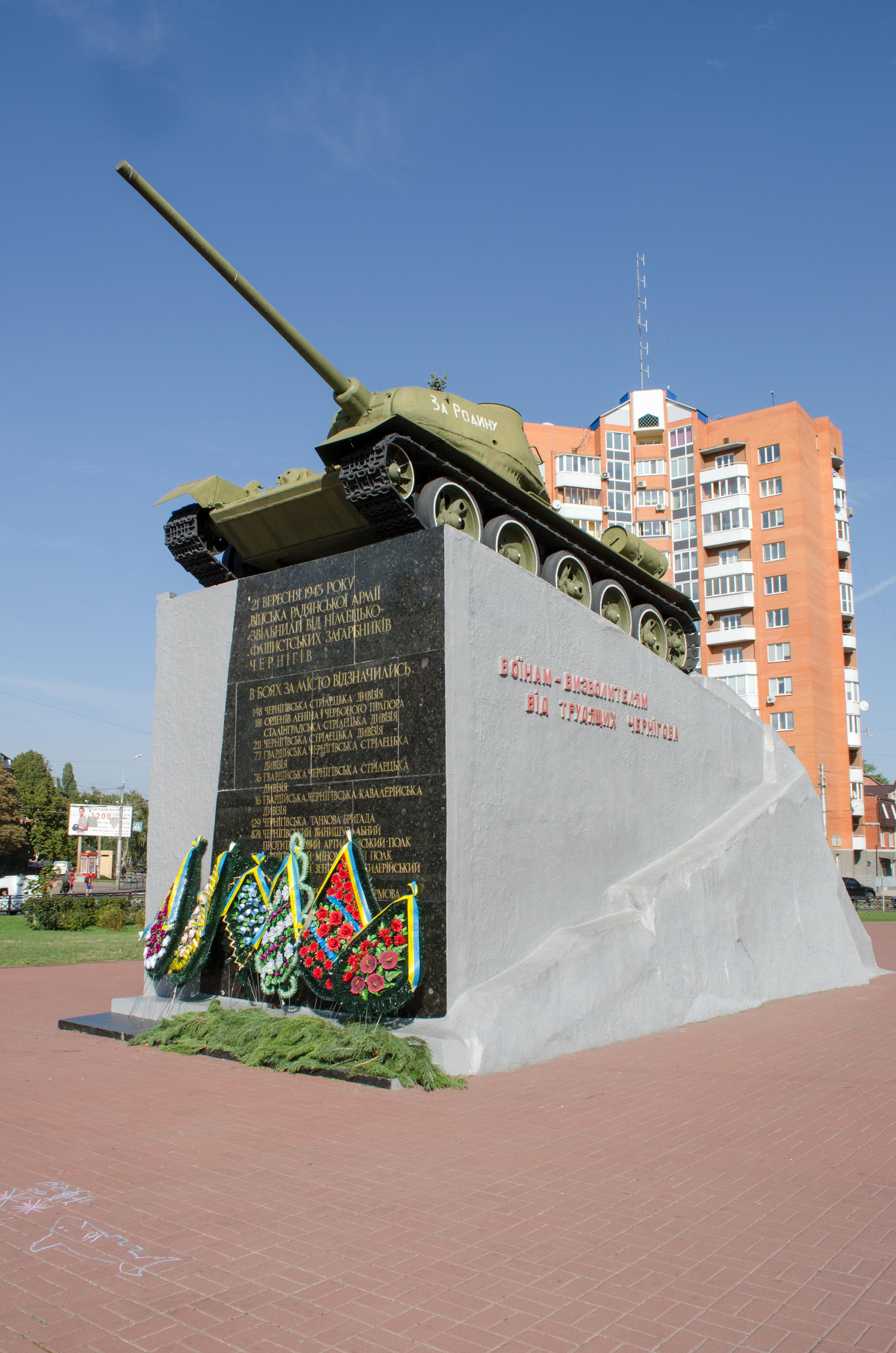

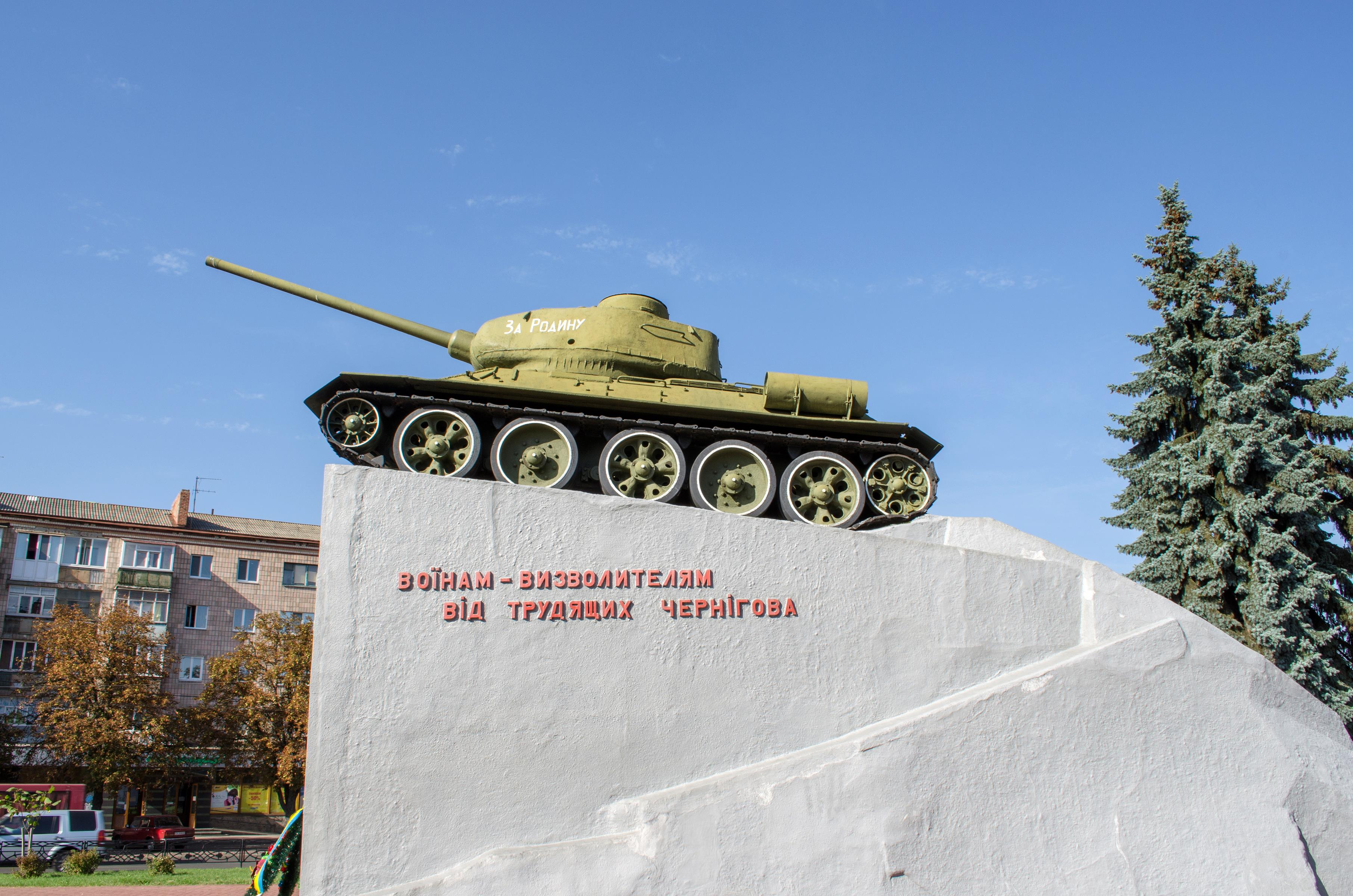

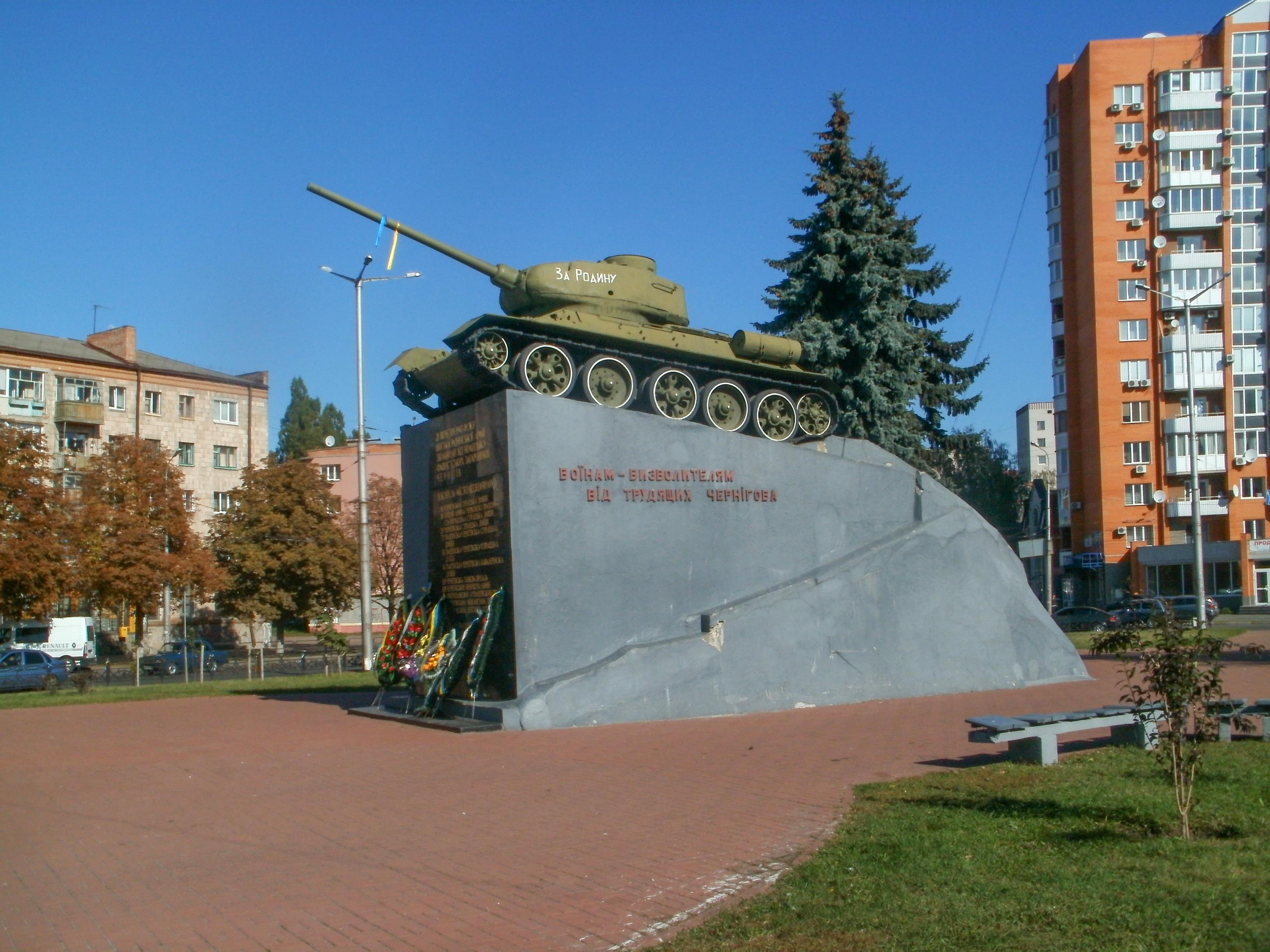

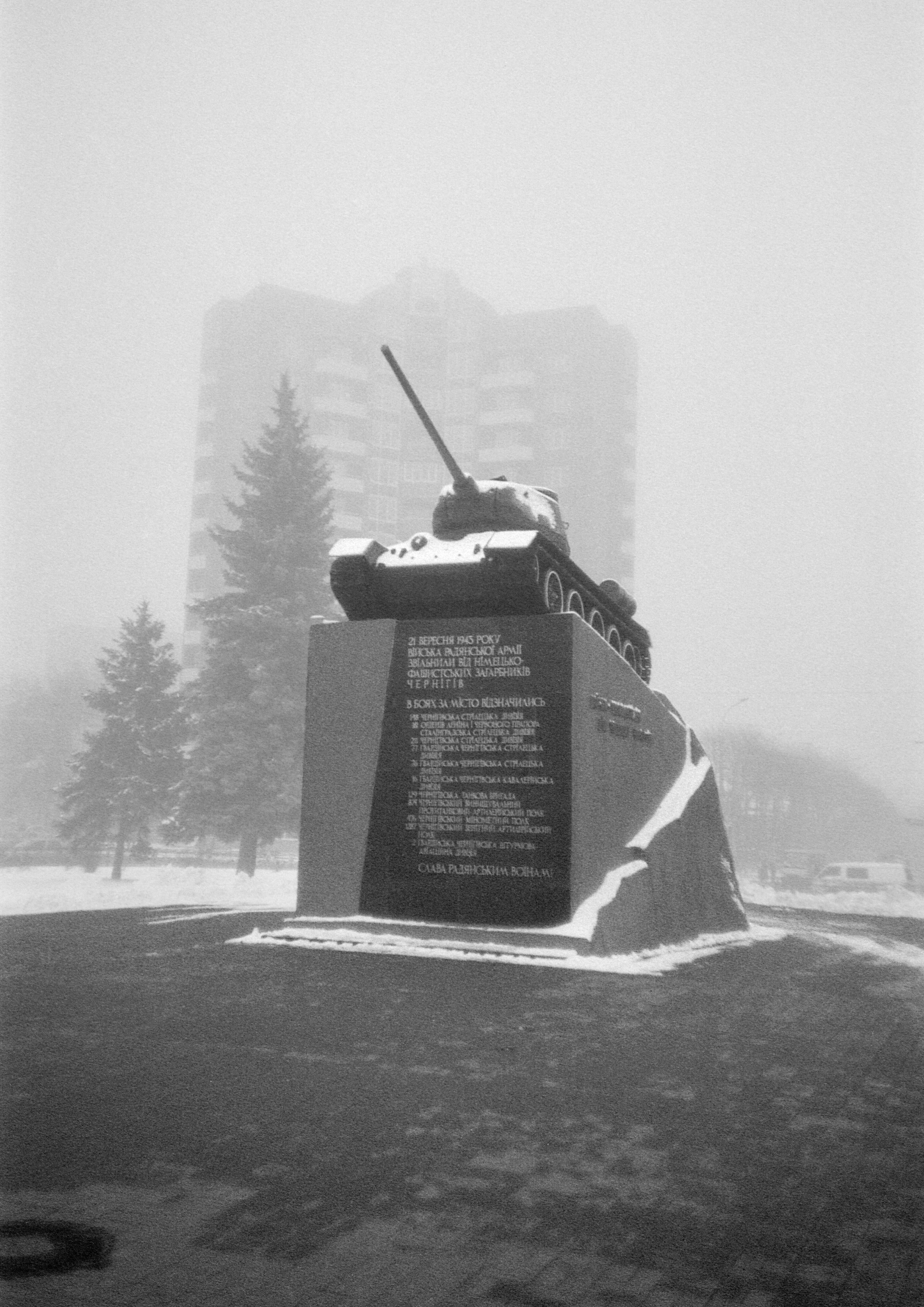
