= Mound of Immortality =

Various war monuments in Belarus and Russia

Mound of Immortality (Russian: Курган Бессмертия, Kurgan Bessmertiya) is the name of several memorials/monuments in the former Soviet Union that commemorate the Soviet soldiers and ordinary citizens who fought and perished during the German–Soviet War. They exist in the following locations:

- Polotsk, Belarus
- Orsha, Belarus
- Bryansk, Russia
- Smolensk, Russia
- Yefremov, Tula Oblast, Russia

In addition there is a Mound of Immortality in honor of Polish-Lithuanian-Belarusian poet Adam Mickiewicz in Novogrudok, Belarus.

== See also ==
- Mound of Glory
