= Mother Armenia, Gyumri =

Coordinates: 40°46′49.80″N 43°49′29.30″E

Mother Armenia
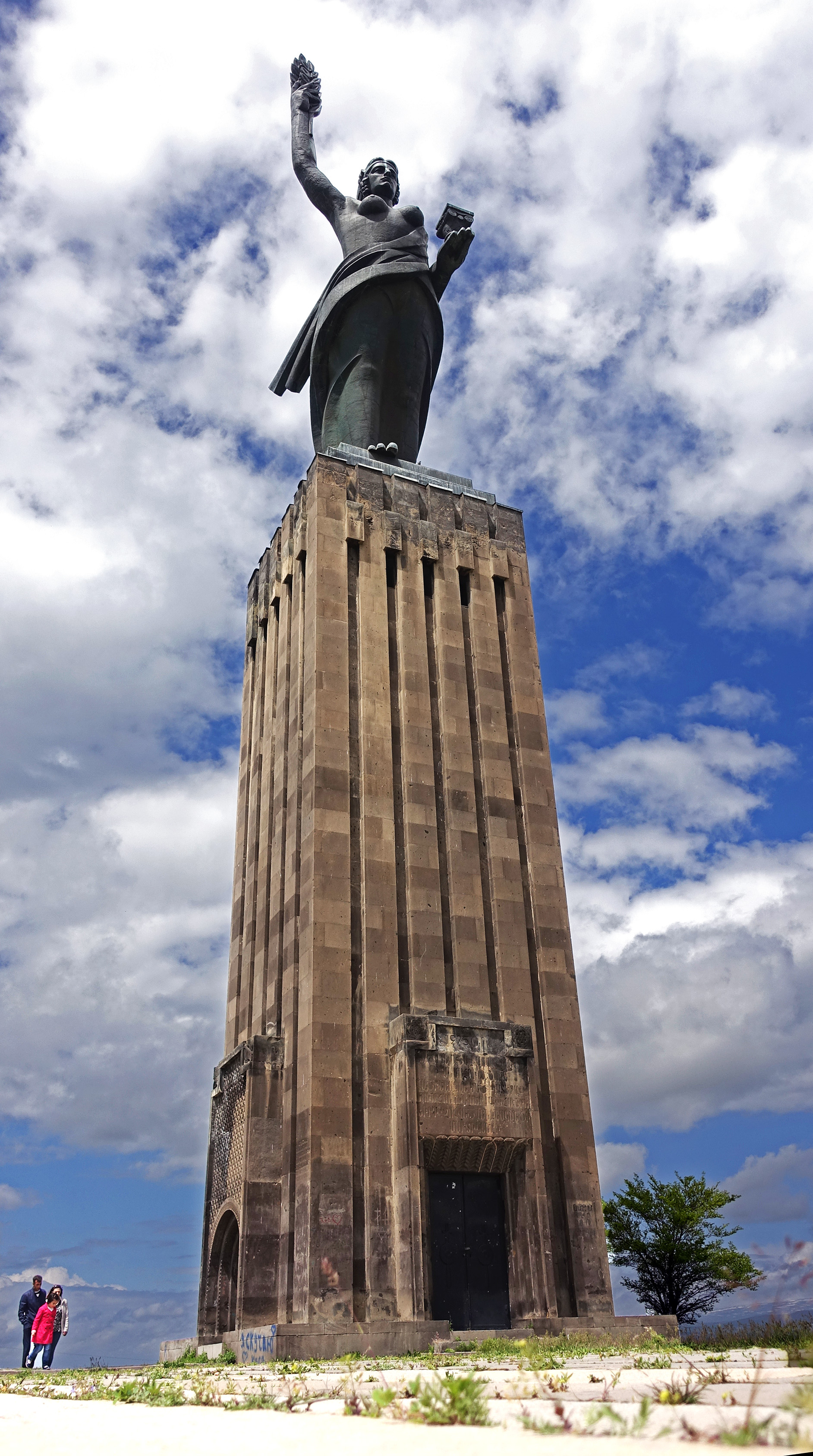
- Mother Armenia
- Interactive map of Mother Armenia
- Location: Gyumri, Armenia

History
- Founded: 1975

Site notes
- Architect: Rafik Yeghoyan
- Sculptor: Ara Sargsian, Yerem Vartanyan, Gaspar Gasparyan

The Mother Armenia (Armenian: Մայր Հայաստան, romanized: Mayr Hayastan) monumental statue is a female personification of Armenia, located in the city of Gyumri. It resembles the monumental complex of Mother Armenia in the capital Yerevan. It was erected in 1975 on a hill west of Gyumri city. It was composed by sculptors Ara Sargsian, Gaspar Gasparyan and Yerem Vartanyan. The architect is Rafik Yeghoyan.

== Gallery ==
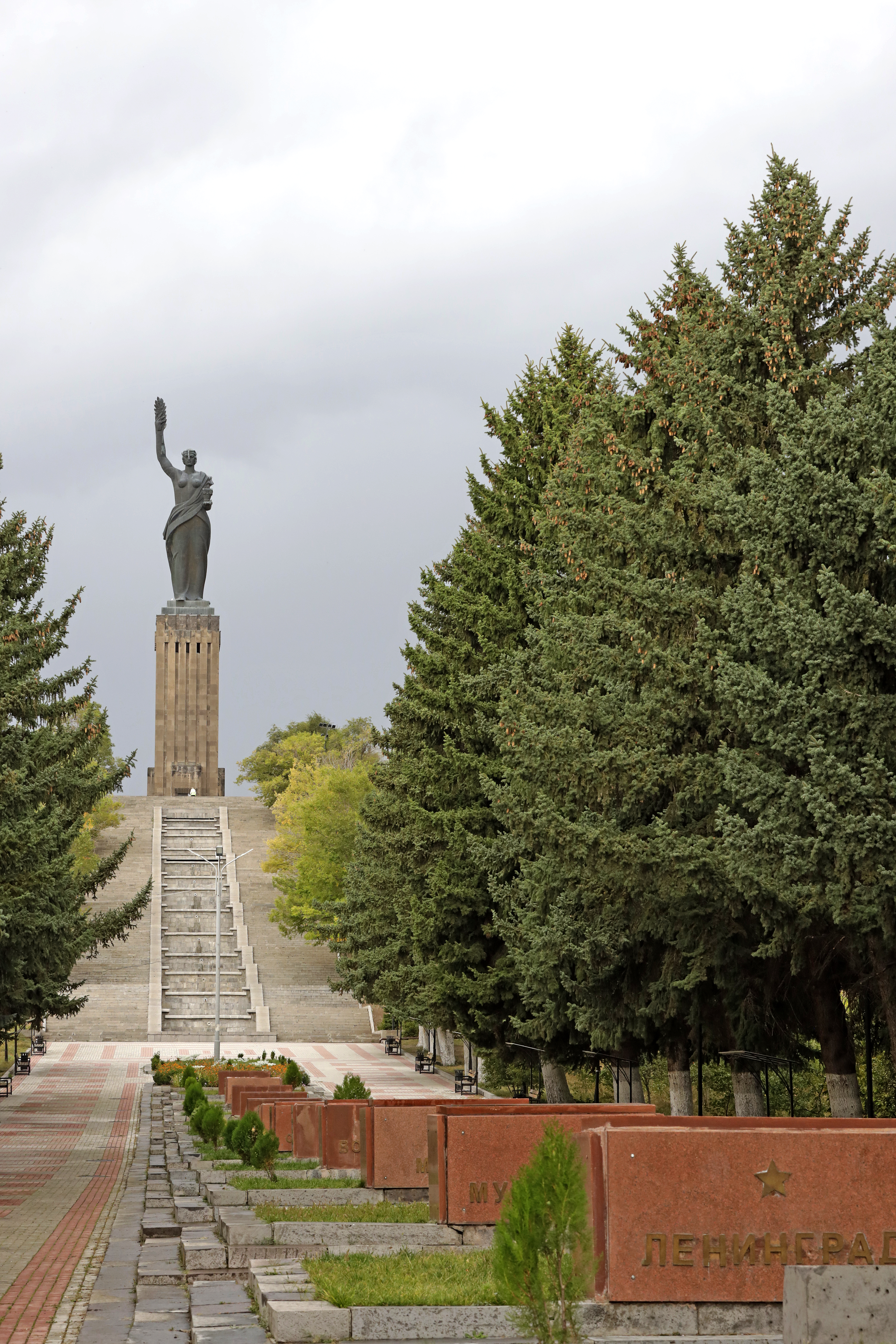

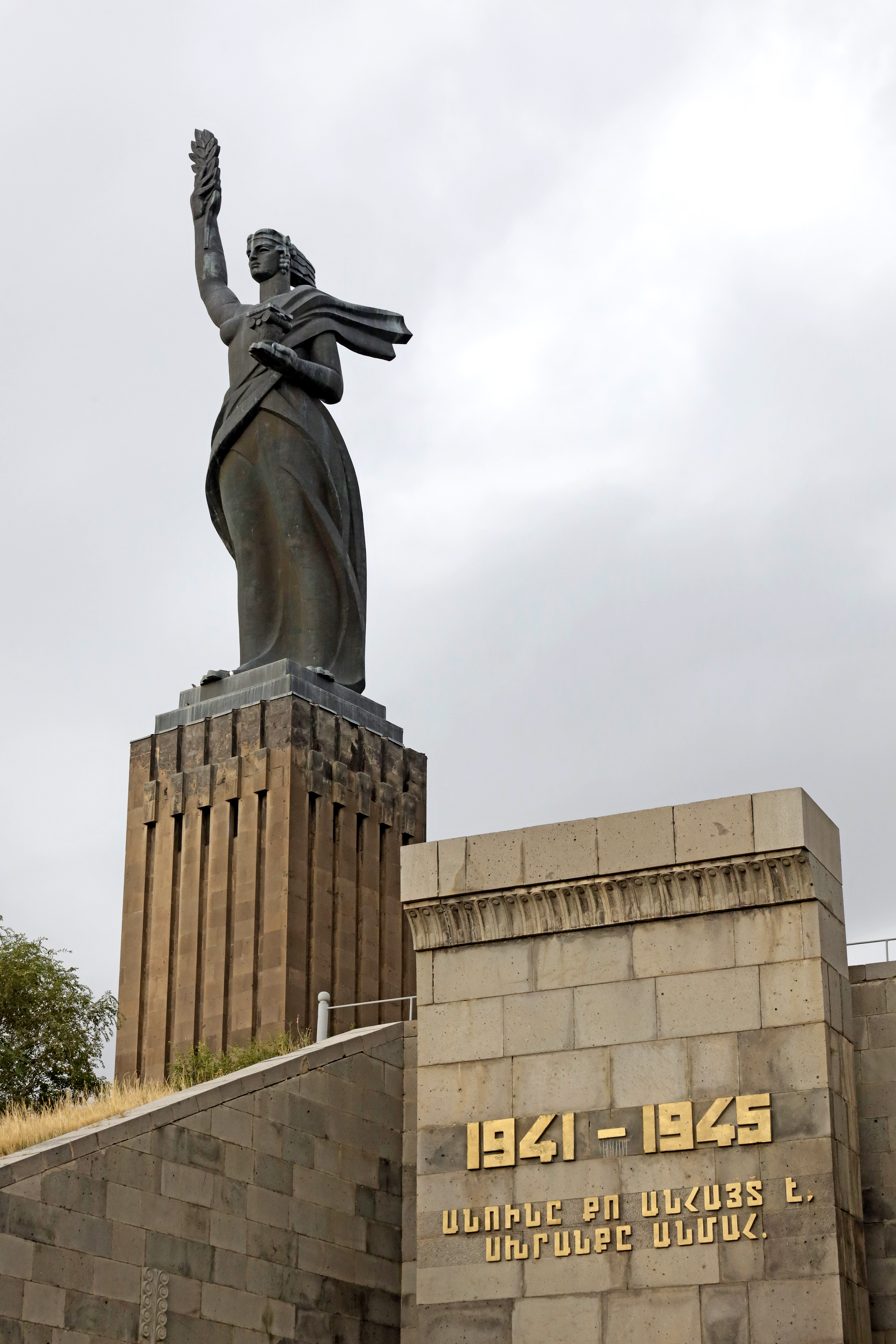

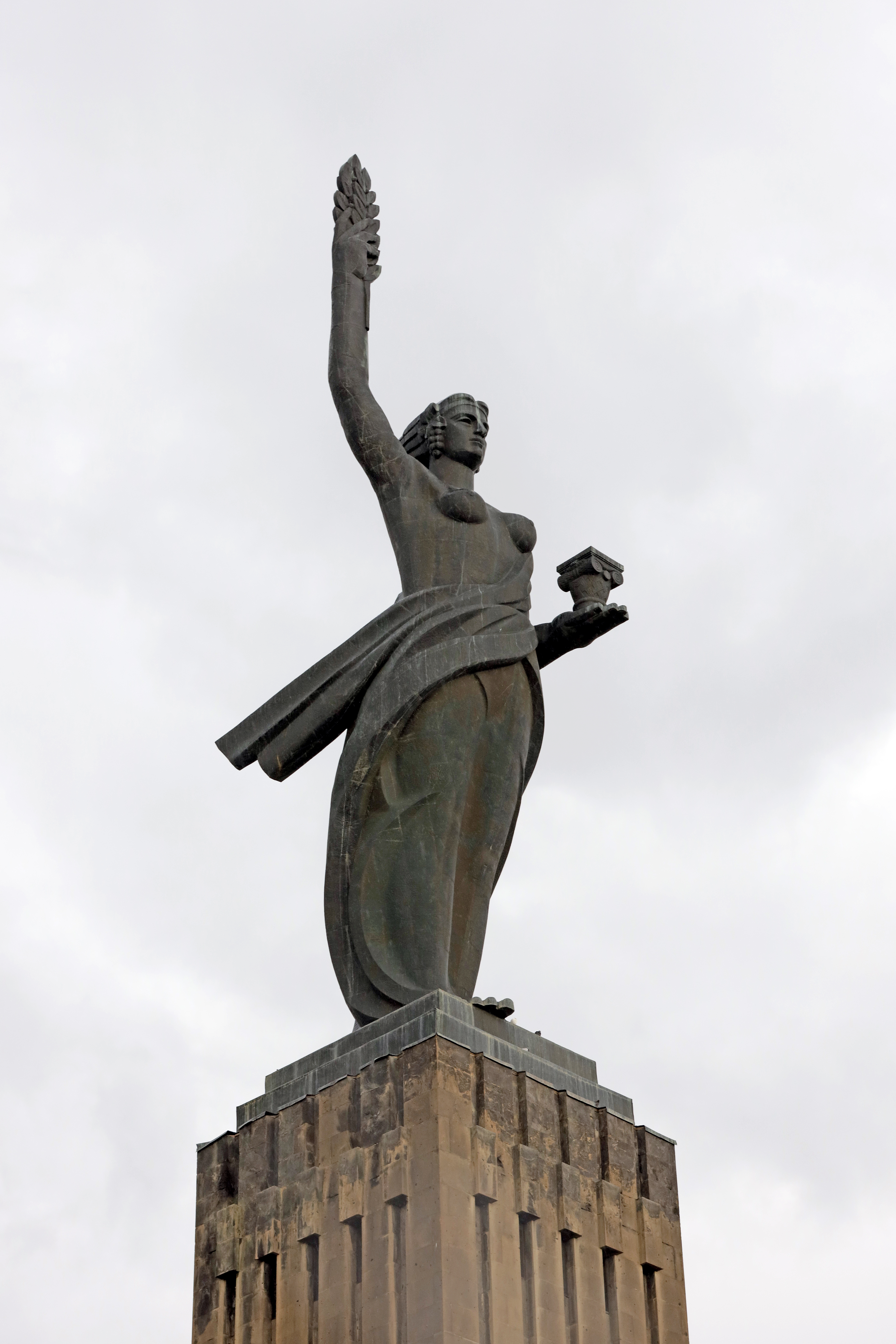

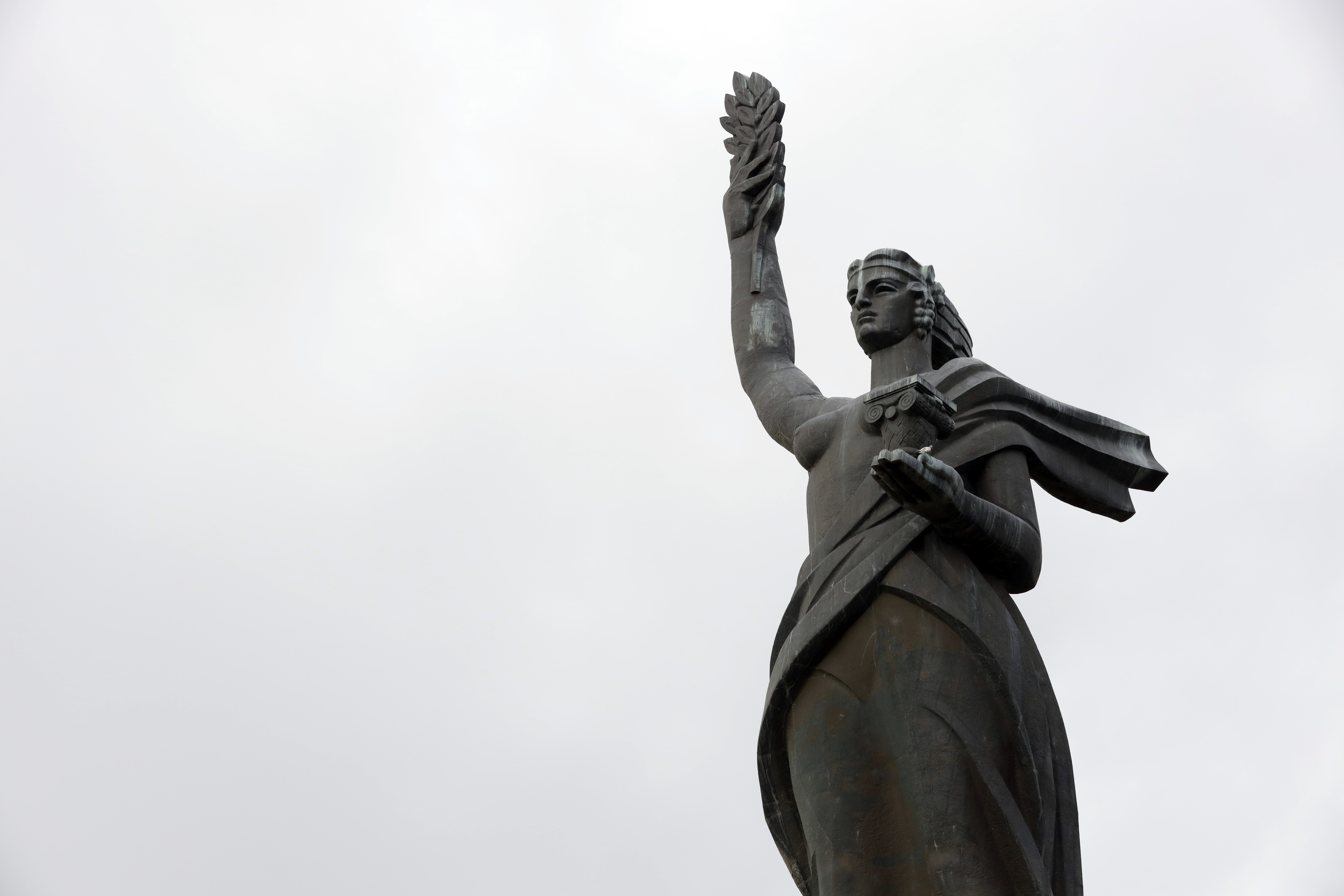

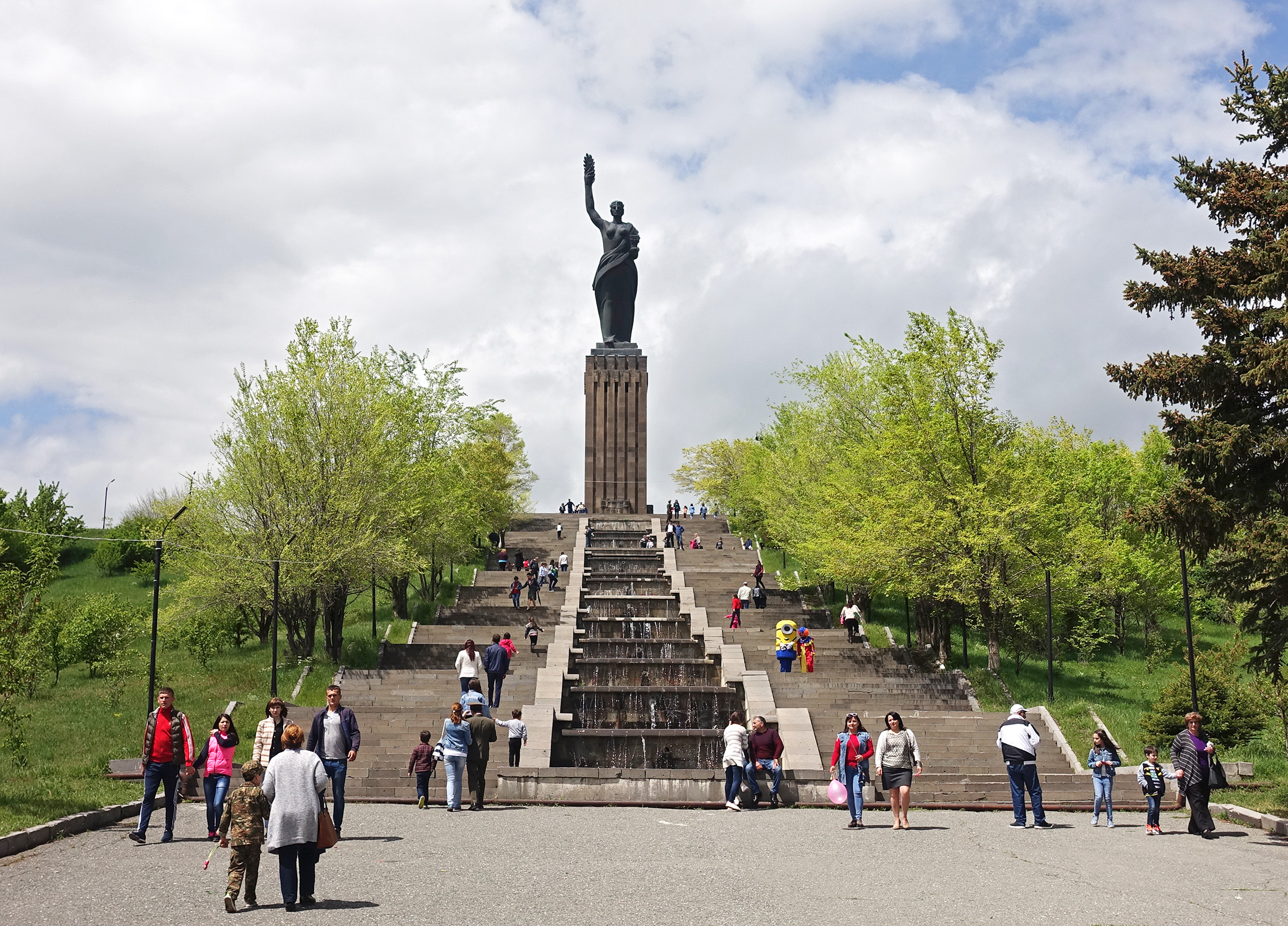
Victory park

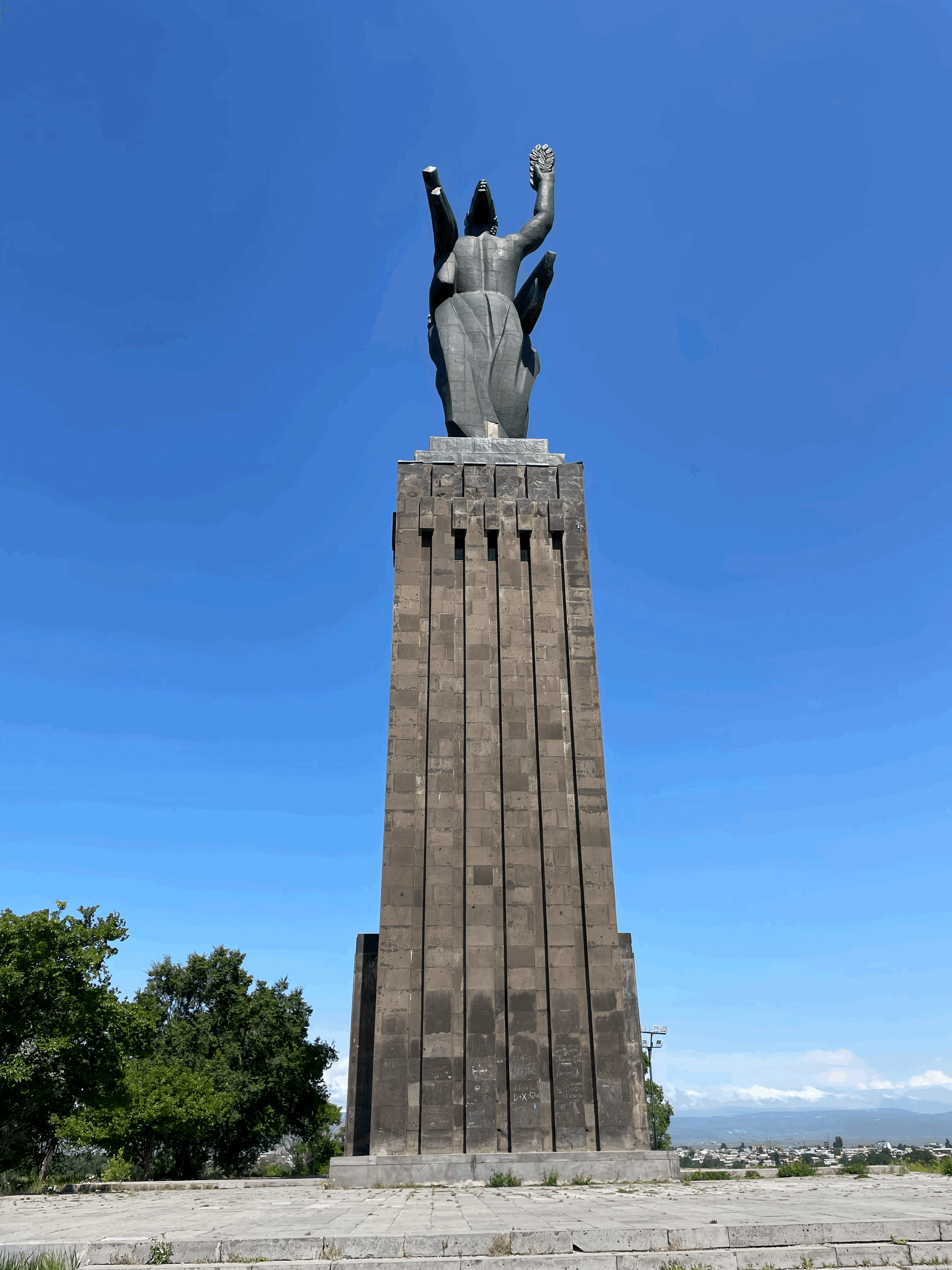
