= National Memorial of the Republic of Belarus =

World War II memorial in Minsk, Belarus

Coordinates: 54°20′06″N 27°56′39″E

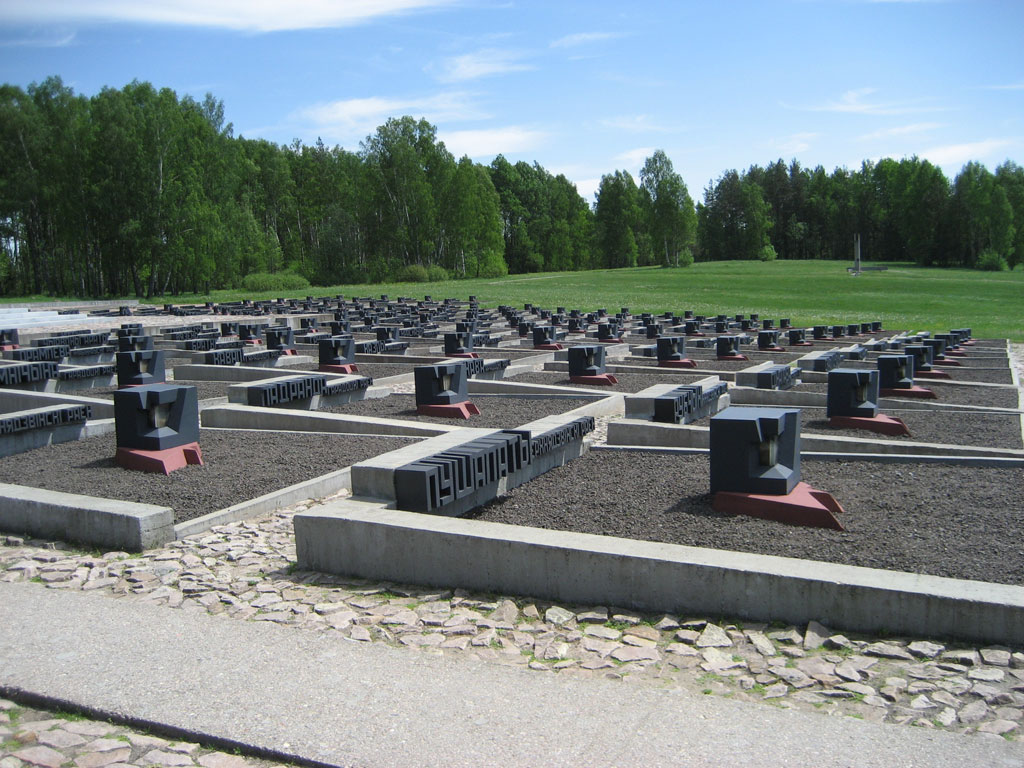
Cemetery of the burned villages

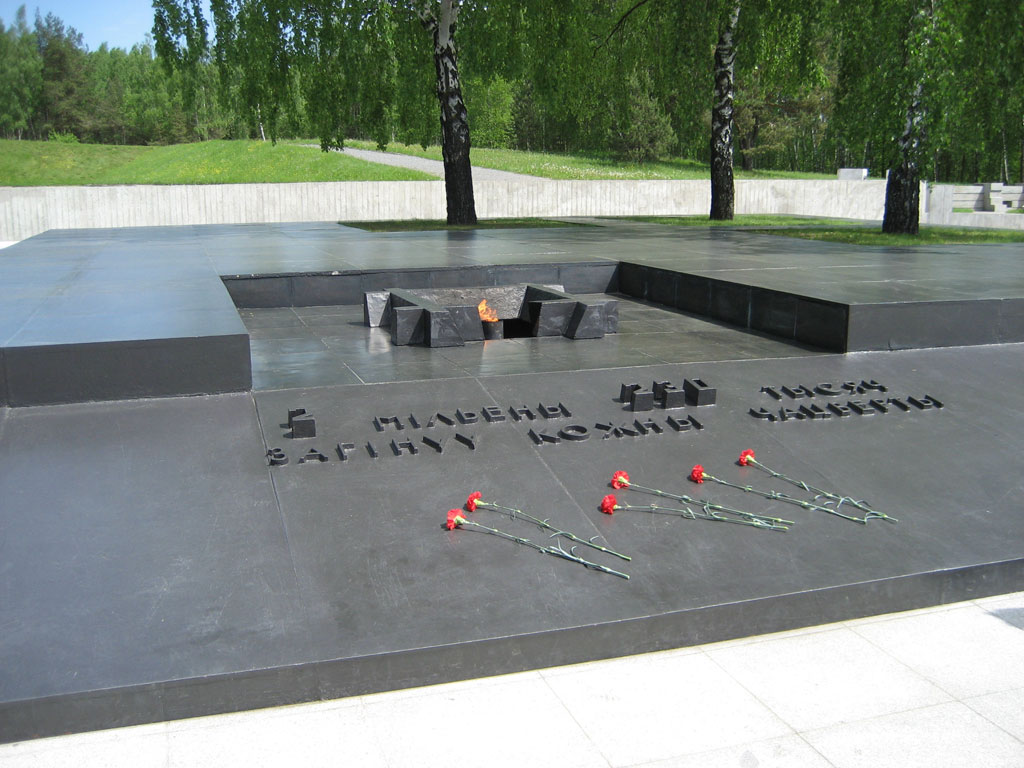
The eternal flame

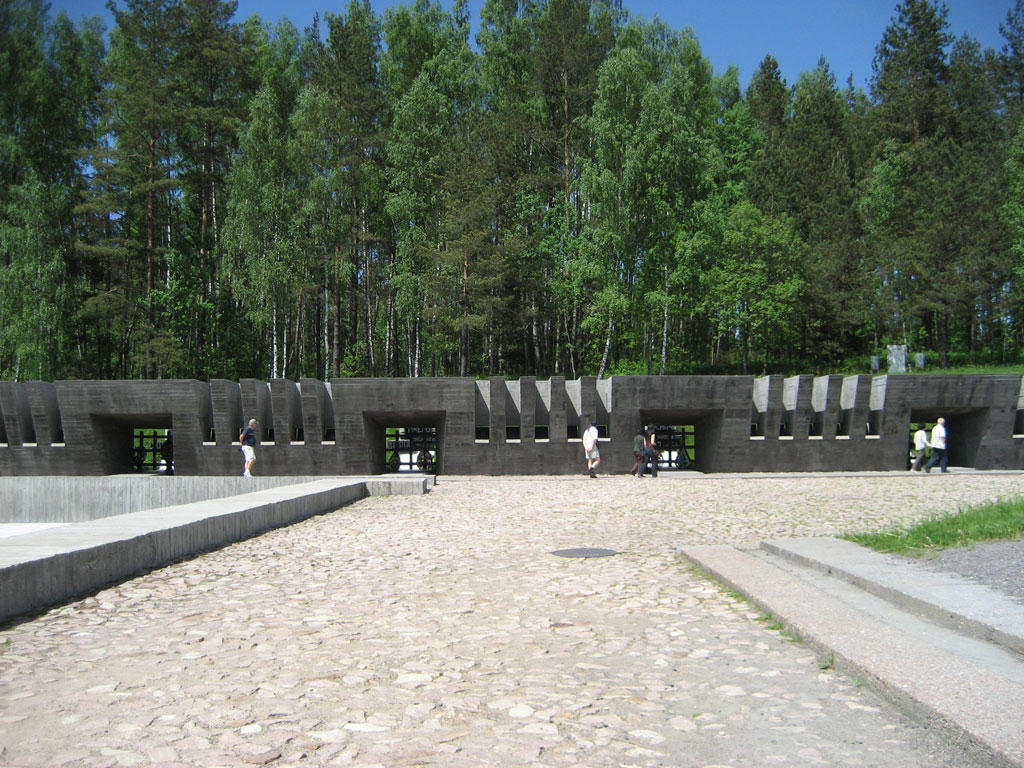
The memorial wall

The Khatyn national state memorial of the Republic of Belarus is the central war memorial of Belarus for all victims of the German occupation during World War II. It commemorates particularly the more than 600 "burnt villages" which, together with their inhabitants, were destroyed by the Germans throughout the war. The Khatyn massacre was one of them; the village lies about 60 kilometres north of Minsk on the road to Vitebsk in the Logoisky district, in the Minsk Region.

== Background ==
Of about nine million people who fell into the hands of the Germans in Belarus, about 1.6 to 1.7 million were murdered, namely 700,000 prisoners of war, 500,000 to 550,000 Jews, 345,000 victims of the so-called partisan combat and about 100,000 members of other population groups. In addition, several hundred thousand Belarusians fell in the ranks of the Red Army.

More than 147,000 people died in over 5,000 villages that were completely or partially destroyed. 627 villages were totally destroyed, 186 of them not rebuilt after the war. A total of 345,000 people were killed in German partisan combat in Belarus. Nine out of ten of the victims were not partisans.

Of the total number of 5295 villages destroyed, 3% were destroyed in the first year of war in 1941, 16% in 1942, 63% in 1943 and 18% in 1944.

Frequently state visitors come here to lay a wreath in memory of the more than two million dead.

The destruction of Khatyn and the murder of the villagers was an act of revenge in response to the bombardment of a German motorcade by Belarusian partisans on 22 March 1943, killing the company commander, Captain Hans Woellke, and three Ukrainian members of the Battalion 118 protection team. On the same day Khatyn was plundered and destroyed by Battalion 118 and SS Special Battalion Dirlewanger. They drove the inhabitants first into the village barn, set it on fire and with machine guns shot the people who tried to save themselves from the barn. A total of 149 villagers died, including 75 children. One adult, the then 56-year-old village blacksmith Iosif Kaminskij, and five children survived the destruction of Khatyn and the Second World War. Two more girls were able to flee from the burning barn into the forest and were taken in by inhabitants of the village Khvorosteni, but then died in the destruction of that very village.

== The memorial ==
The memorial was inaugurated on 5 July 1969. It was designed and created by the architects Yuri Gradow, Leonid Lewin, Walentin Sankowitsch and the sculptor Sergej Selichanow. The opening began with a mourning ceremony in Minsk. Delegations from Russia, Ukraine, Georgia, Moldova and other republics of the Soviet Union, from the then twin cities and other foreign guests took part in the ceremony and the trip to Khatyn. This village represents the many destroyed villages in Belarus. The survivor Kaminskij also spoke at the opening ceremony.

The renovation and reconstruction of the State Memorial "Khatyn" was completed in July 2004, on the occasion of the 60th anniversary of the "Liberation of Belarus from the German-Fascist Conquerors" in Khatyn, which was commemorated in the presence of the Presidents of Belarus, Aljaksandr Lukashenka, Russia, Vladimir Putin, and Ukraine, Leonid Kuchma. In July 2004, a photographic exposition was inaugurated at the memorial, commemorating Khatyn, Maly Trostenez and the Ozarichi concentration camp as another example.

The memorial contains many symbols, the three most important of which are probably the memories of Khatyn, the cemetery of the burnt villages and the trees of the rebuilt villages.

Furthermore, the "eternal flame" burns in a large black granite stone block on which three birches grow.

This symbolizes the fact that about a quarter of all Belarusian inhabitants died in the Second World War.

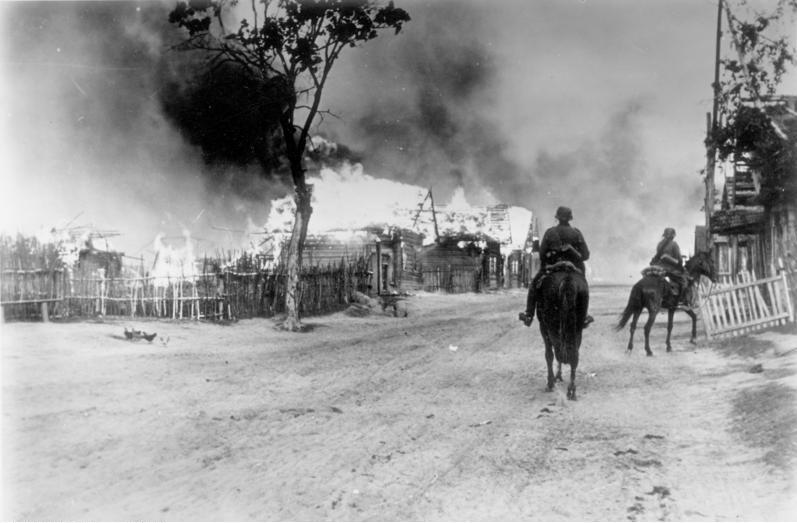
Soviet Union 1941: Burning village

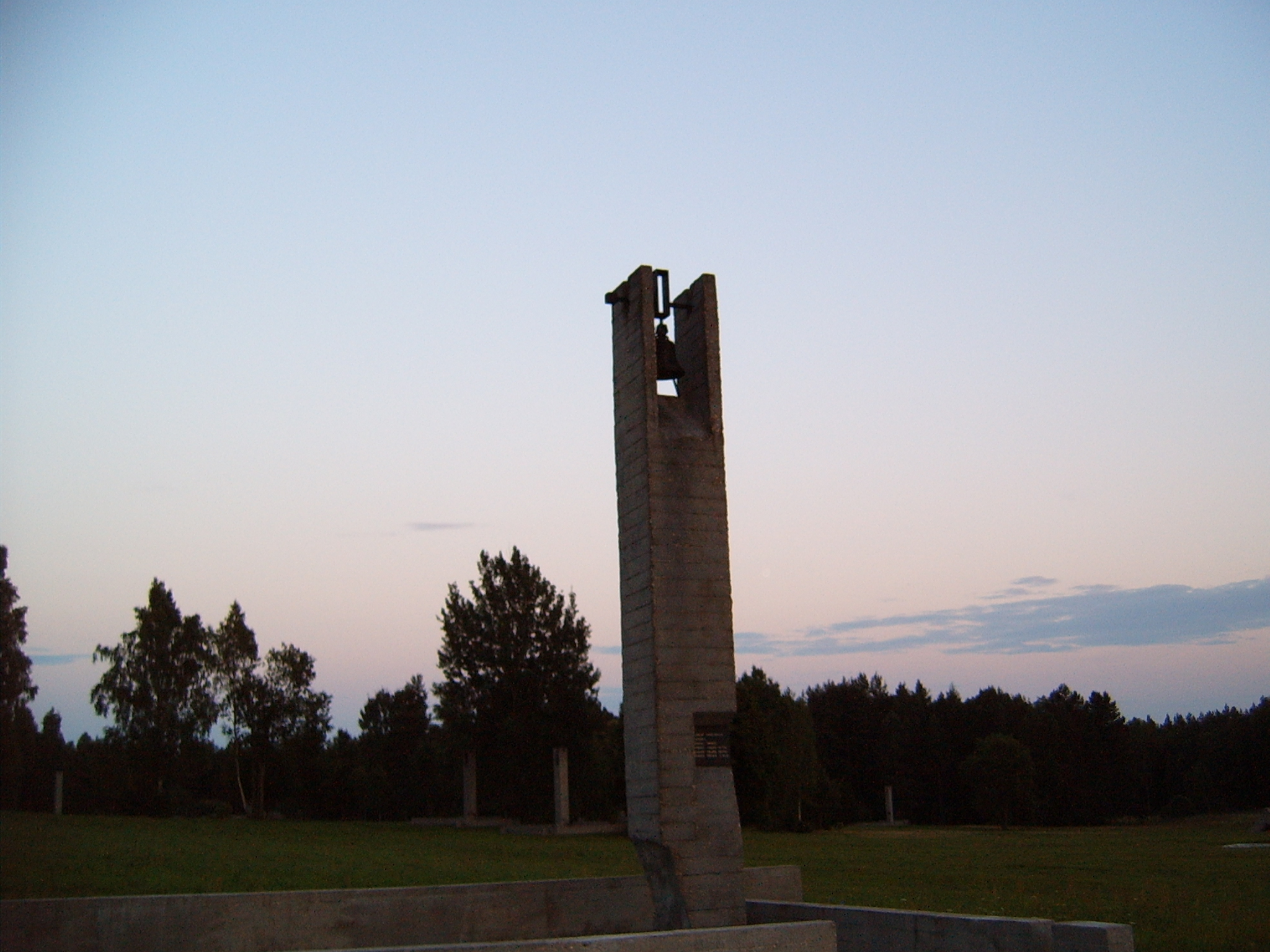
The symbolic fireplaces of Khatyn

Everywhere in the area where the houses of Khatyn village once stood, their floor plans are indicated by concrete beams embedded in the ground. A symbolic chimney juts out into the air as a reminder of each fire ruin. A bell strikes every thirty seconds together with all the other bells in the chimney steles commemorating the destroyed houses. The number and ages of the victims are recorded at each house. At the entrance of the symbolic village there is a six-metre-high bronze sculpture depicting Iosif Kaminskij carrying his dead son Adam in his arms. Behind the sculpture there is also a symbolic reproduction of the village barn, which commemorates the annihilation of the village population.

The cemetery of the burned villages looks like the burial grounds on any modern cemetery. Uniform rows of graves and identical type of lettering. But each of the 185 graves represents a village that was destroyed in the so-called punitive operations. On each grave there is an urn filled with native soil and an inscription with the name of the village and the name of the district where the village used to be, which remained extinct after the war.

The names of 433 Belarusian villages, burned like Khatyn but rebuilt after the war, are immortalized like branches on symbolic "trees of life". In the Logojskij district alone, 21 villages and their populations were burned down. After the war 11 villages were rebuilt.

In a long memorial wall, memorial plates with the names and deaths of the concentration camps and extermination sites in Belarus were placed in niches. The path along this wall commemorates over 260 death camps and mass extermination sites of the German SS, the Ordnungspolizei and the Wehrmacht.
