= Monument to the Revolution of 1905 =

Monument in Tallinn, Estonia

- 59°26′06″N 24°44′58″E
- Location: Tallinn, Estonia

Memorial to the Revolution of 1905 in Tallinn, Estonia, is a public monument erected to commemorate the events of the Revolution of 1905. The only writing upon the monument is the date of "1905", in a similar manner to its counterpart in Riga, Latvia.
