= Novozavodskyi District =

City district of Chernihiv, Ukraine

Novozavodskyi District Новозаводський район
- Urban district
- Interactive map of Novozavodskyi District
- Coordinates: 51°30′00″N 31°18′00″E
- Country: Ukraine
- City: Chernihiv
- Established: 3 January 1974

Area
  - Total: 32.62 km^{2} (12.59 sq mi)

Population (2010)
  - Total: 179,600
  - Density: 5,506/km^{2} (14,260/sq mi)
- Time zone: UTC+2 (EET)
  - Summer (DST): UTC+3 (EEST)

The Novozavodskyi District (Ukrainian: Новозаводський район, romanized: Novozavodskyi raion) is one of two administrative urban districts (raions) of the city of Chernihiv, located in northern Ukraine.
