= Victory Square (Vitebsk) =

Square in Vitebsk, Belarus

Coordinates: 55.1842°N 30.2030°E

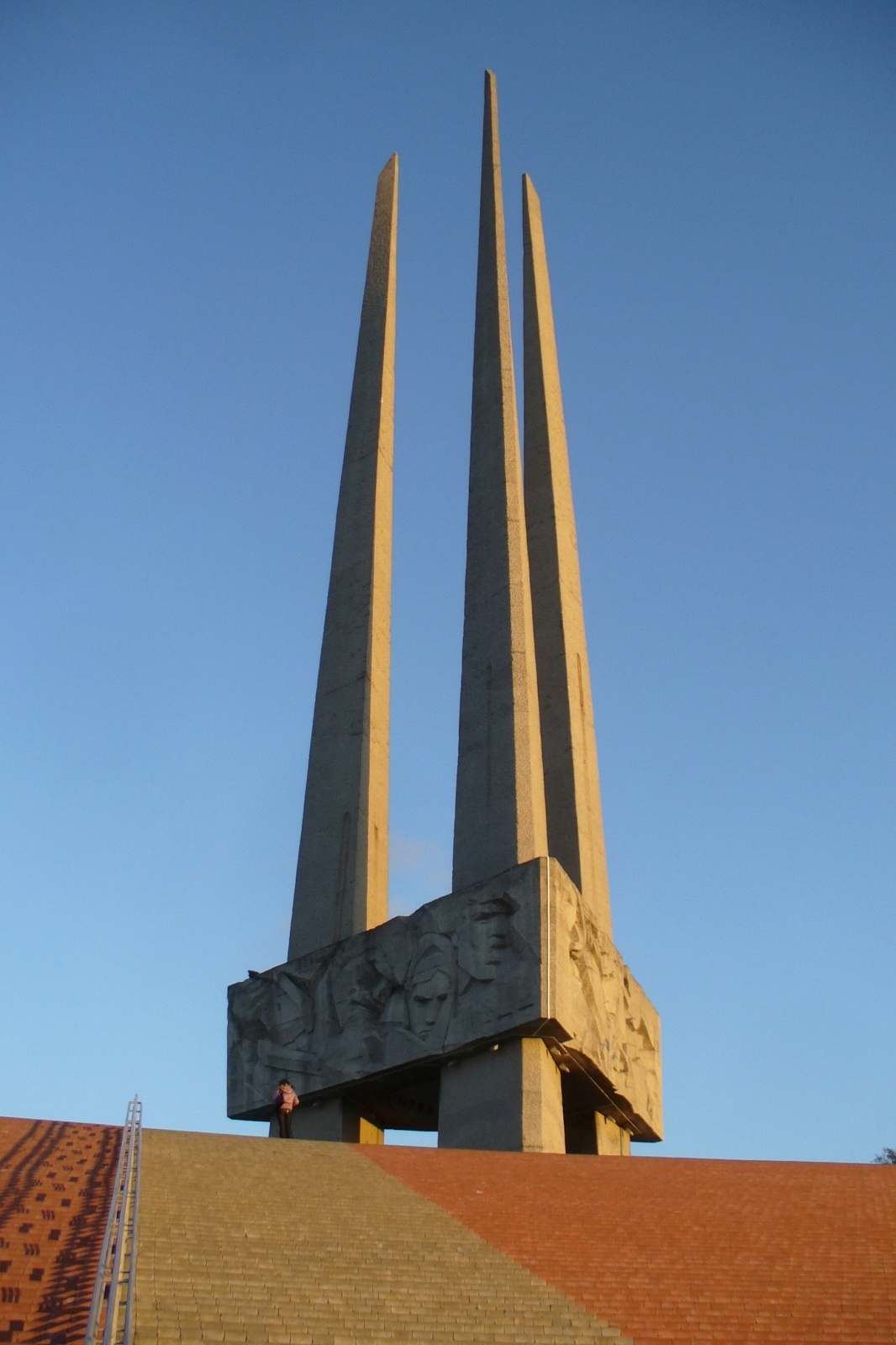
The victory monument on the square in the evening.

Victory Square (Belarusian: Плошча Перамогі, romanized: Plošča Pieramohi) is a square in Vitebsk, Belarus. It is currently the largest square in Belarus. It is situated on the bank of the Dvina River. During all the major public holidays (ex: Victory Day and Independence Day), parades and performances take place on the square. In the winter, the main Christmas tree in the country is located on the square.

== History ==
The area got its name in 1973, being called Orsha Square prior to that. Until the mid-1960s, the square consisted of city bath, which was adjacent to the local cemetery. It was opened on 30 June 1974 as part of the national celebrations in the Byelorussian Soviet Socialist Republic in honor of the 30th anniversary of the Minsk Offensive and in the framework the local events held in honor of the same anniversary of the Vitebsk–Orsha Offensive. In 1990, the memorial part was supplemented with two sculptural groups on the descent to the memorial. In 2009, the square went through reconstruction. In early May 2010, the reconstruction of Victory Square was completed in time for the 65th anniversary of the defeat of Nazi Germany.

== Three Bayonets ==
The Victory Square Memorial Complex, also known as Three Bayonets, is located on the square and commemorates Soviet Red Army soldiers, as well as partisans in the Belarusian resistance from Vitebsk Oblast who served during the Eastern Front of World War II. There are three 56-meter bayonet-like figures on a relief depicting Soldiers, Underground Fighters and Partisans. The eternal flame is lit on the star-shaped podium.
