= Monument to the Liberator Soldier (Kharkiv) =

Monument in Kharkiv, Ukraine

- Пам'ятник Воїну-визволителю
- Interactive map of Monument to the Liberator Soldier
- Location: Kharkiv, Ukraine
- Coordinates: 50°2′5.6″N 36°13′16.4″E
- Type: statue
- Opening date: 1981
- Dedicated to: Red Army

Immovable Monument of Local Significance of Ukraine
- Official name: Пам’ятник радянським воїнам-визволителям (Monument to Soviet Soldiers-Liberators)
- Type: Monumental Art
- Reference no.: 1816-Ха

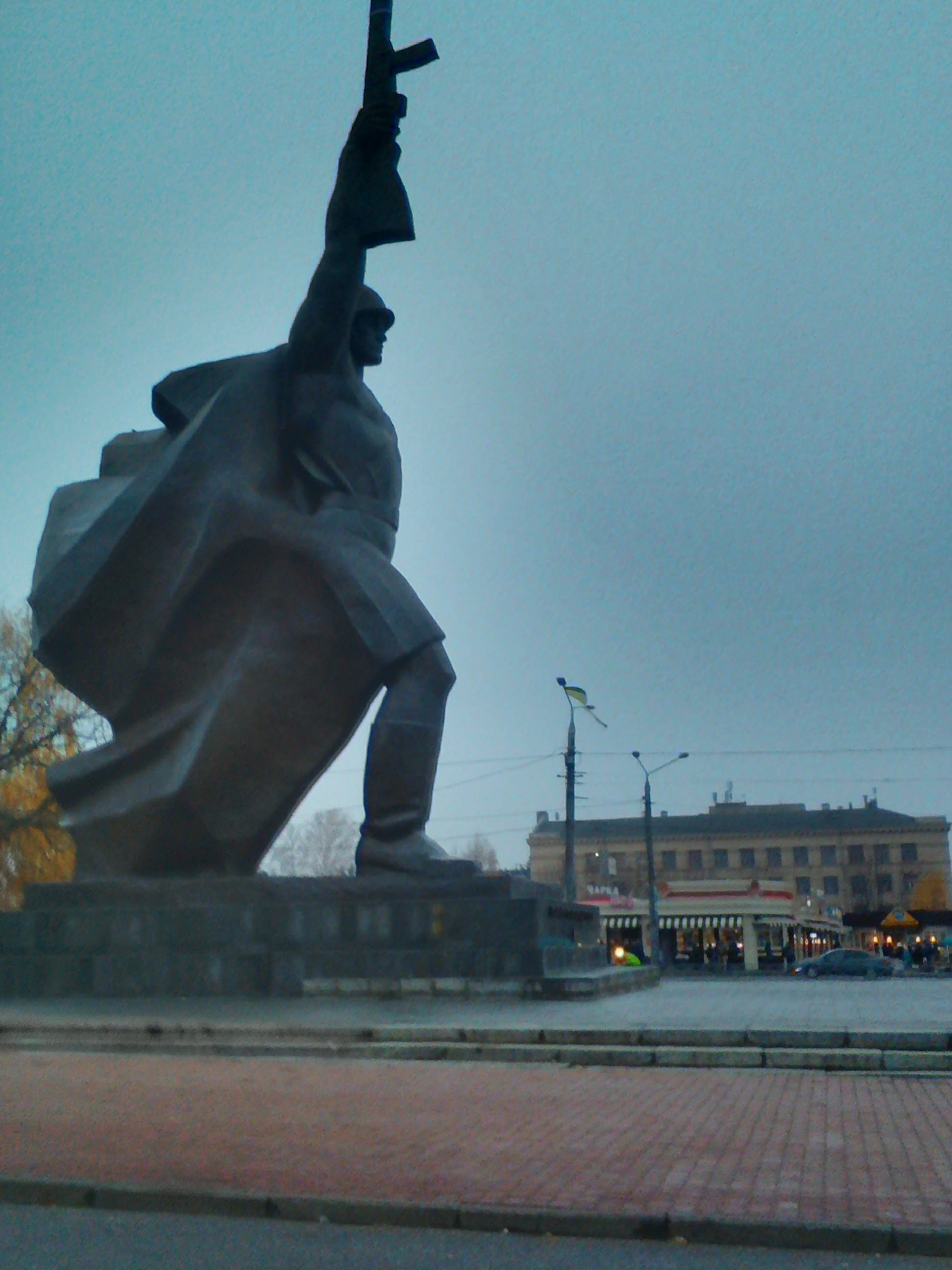
Monument to the Liberator Soldier (photographed 2016)

The Monument to the Liberator Soldier (Ukrainian: Пам'ятник Воїну-визволителю, romanized: Pamiatnyk Voinu-vyzvolyteliu, Russian: Памятник Воину-освободителю), commonly called "Pavlusha" (Ukrainian: Павлуша, Russian: Павлуша), is a large monument in Kharkiv to the Red Army troops who recaptured the city from Nazi Germany in 1943.

The monument is located across from the August 23 metro station. It was dedicated in 1981. The sculptors were Y. I. Ryk and I. P. Yastryebov, and the architects were A. A. Maksimenko, E. A. Svyatchenko, and E. Y. Cherkasov. The centerpiece is a large statue of a Red Army soldier with a carbine raised high in his right hand. The statue is flanked by two artillery pieces and walls with replicas of the Order of Victory and the Order of the Patriotic War.

By 2009, the monument was in need of repair and maintenance. Previously, this had been the responsibility of the Green Areas Trust, but this body was now defunct, and so the monument had not been maintained for a decade, and required attention including testing for structural integrity, cleaning, and refacing of the pedestal.

The repair was paid for by extrabudgetary funds. Money was raised by local and regional party leaders. Repair and cleaning of the pedestal alone cost more than ₴60,000. The project was completed within six months, in time for Victory Day (May 9) of 2010. Further cleaning and restoration was done in 2012.

Kharkivites call the monument "Pavlusha" (by way of analogy with the Bulgarian monument "Alyosha" in Plovdiv), or simply "The Soldier". It is a popular meeting place and background for photographs.

In 2013, the National Bank of Ukraine issued a commemorative coin, "Liberation of Kharkiv from the Fascist Invaders", as part of the series Victory in the Great Patriotic War of 1941–1945, showing the statue on the obverse.

The monument was damaged by Russian artillery shelling on May 23, 2022.
