= Mound of Glory =

Memorial in Belarus

Coordinates: 54°01′07″N 27°53′54″E

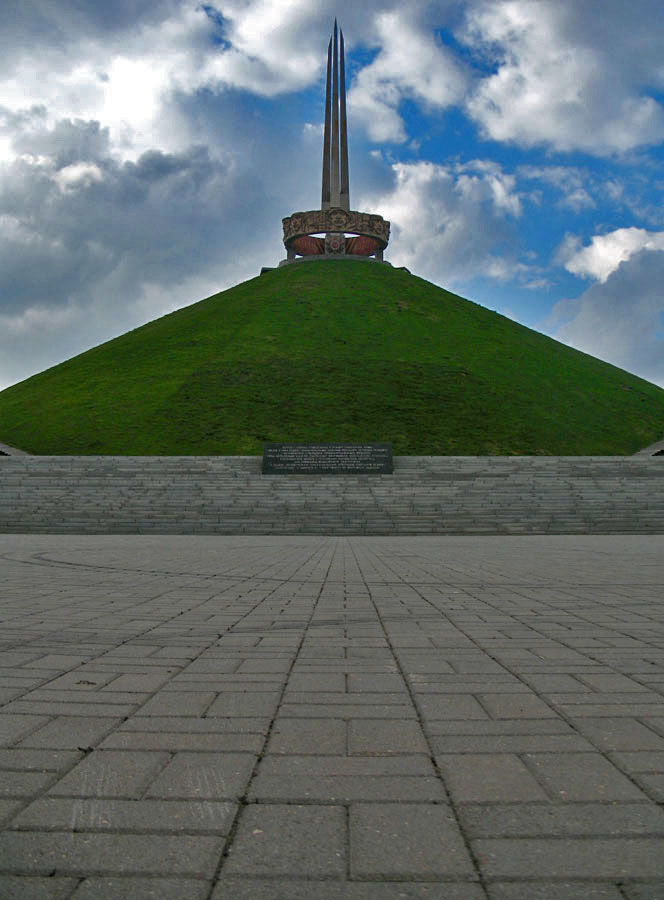
Mound of Glory

The Mound of Glory (Belarusian: Курган Славы, romanized: Kurhan Slavy, lit. 'Kurgan of Glory') is a memorial complex honouring Soviet soldiers who fought during World War II, located 21 km from Minsk, Belarus on the Moscow Highway. Designed by O.Stakhovich and sculpted by Andrei Bembel, it was established in 1969 on the 25th anniversary of the liberation of Belarus during Operation Bagration (1944).

== History ==
The monument commemorates the Soviet liquidation of a German pocket during Operation Bagration.

On August 18, 1966, the government of the Byelorussian Soviet Socialist Republic decided to construct a monument, to be named the Mound of Glory, in honor of the Soviet soldiers who fought in World War II and the liberation of Belarus. Construction started in November 1967 and was finished in 1969.

In 2021, the Independence Day ceremony was held at the Mound of Glory.

== See also ==
- Mamayev Kurgan
- Mound of Immortality
