= History of FC Desna Chernihiv =

Desna Chernihiv
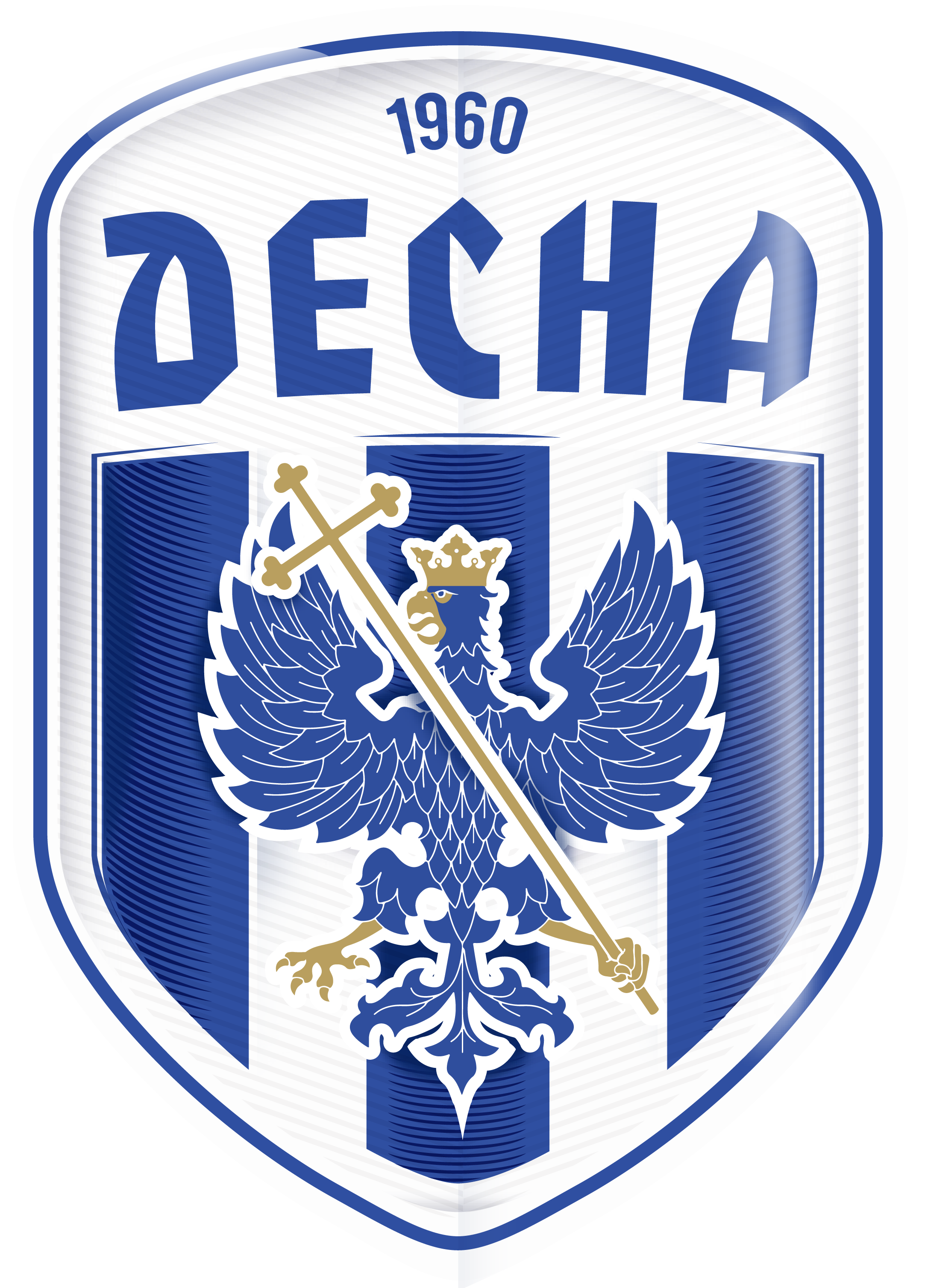
- Full name: Football Club Desna Chernihiv
- Nickname: Siveriany
- Founded: 1960
- Ground: Chernihiv Stadium
- Capacity: 12,060
- Chairman: Volodymyr Levin
- Manager: Oleksandr Ryabokon
- League: Ukrainian Premier League
- 2021–22: Ukrainian Premier League, 7th of 14
- Website: http://desna.football/
Home colours	Away colours

The club's name was "Avanhard" (FC Avanhard Chernihiv) during its first year of existence as part of a republican Avanhard sports society. Between 1961 and 1970 the club was known as Desna Chernihiv.

== Beginnings of Football FC Desna Chernihiv (1960) ==
=== 1960–1968 ===
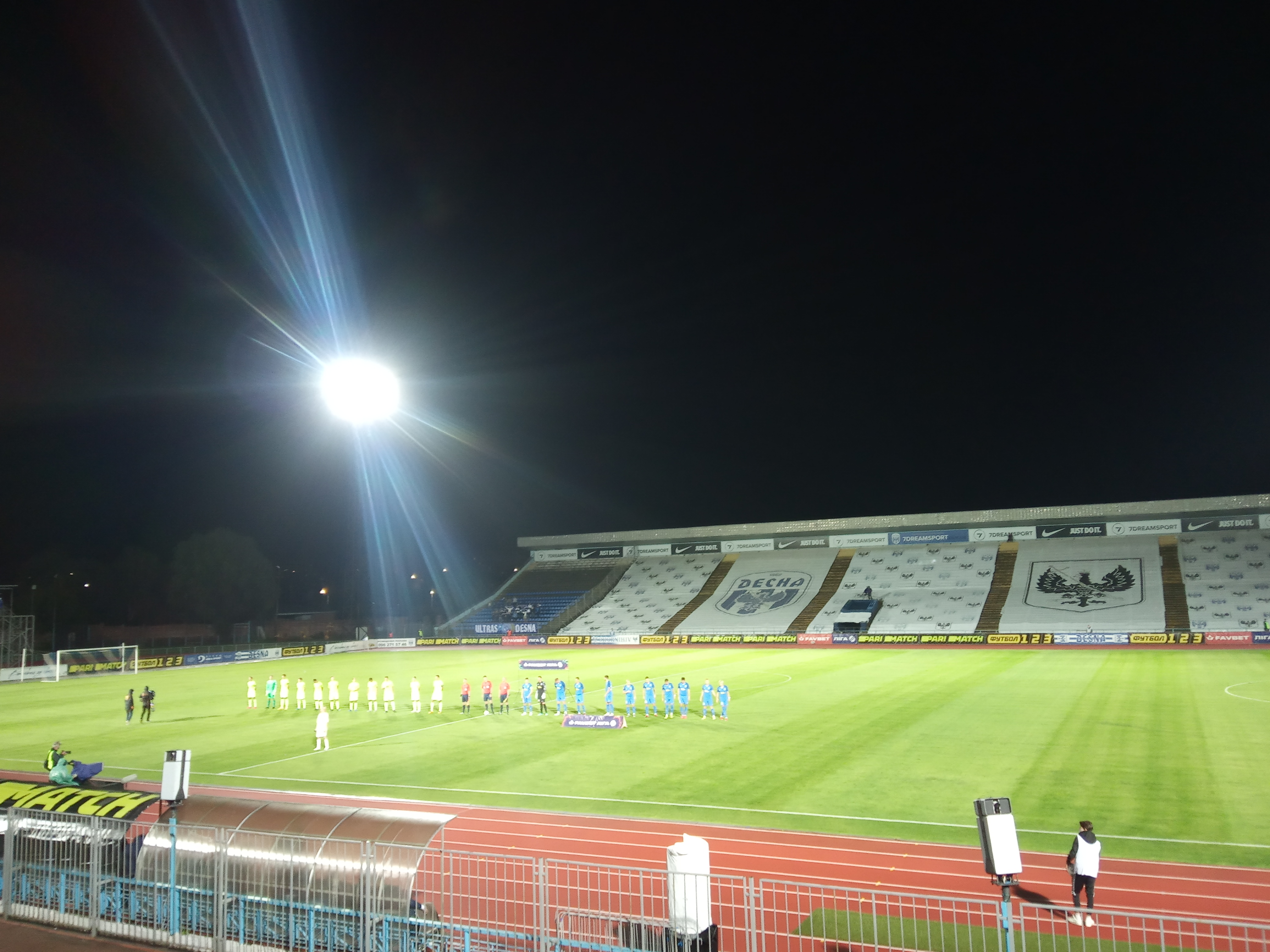
Stadion Yuri Gagarin in Chernihiv opened in 1936 and named in honour of Yuri Gagarin in 1961.

The team of masters was established in Chernihiv in 1960 under the name "Avanhard" as part of the republican Avanhard sports society and entering competitions of the class "B" competitions (concurrently Football Championship of the Ukrainian SSR). That year the Chernihiv team "Avanhard" would take part in the state football championship (challenge) among the Class B teams. The team was created on already existing Chernihiv city team that also was known as Avanhard and played earlier in republican level competitions. In 1960 "Avanhard Chernihiv", signed Viktor Bannikov for one year, considered one of the best goalkeepers in the Soviet Union earning the title of the best twice in 1964 and 1970 and distinguished Master of Sport of USSR (1991). In 1961, the stadium in the city of Chernihiv was named the Russian Soviet cosmonaut Yuri Gagarin and on 25 May 1964, he attended the stadium in person. From 1966 to 1979 the goalkeeper was Yuriy Hruznov from Chernihiv. In the "Avanhard Chernihiv"'s squad were included better footballers of the region (Chernihiv Oblast). Among them are goalkeeper V.Lomako, field players V.Kravchynskyi, Yu.Shkolnikov, O.Finkelberh, and others, in such way the chairman of regional council of sports societies and organizations V.Tatur informed readers of "Desnyanska Pravda" on 10 February 1960. "The team's coach is appointed a former Dynamo Kyiv player Aleksandr Shchanov. These days "Avanhard" will proceed with its training and in already the nearest future in Chernihiv will start reconstruction and upgrade of the city's stadium. In its construction will take part quite a few city residents, public, youth, and Komsomol activists". Over 26 seasons in the USSR championships, Desna played 1,099 matches, of which 380 won, 301 – tied and 418 – lost. They scored 1145 goals, conceded – 1251. In February, "Avanhard Chernihiv" took part in the winter championship of the Chernihiv Oblast (see Chernihiv Oblast Football Federation), and the team played their first official match on April 17, 1960, in Kirovohrad against the "Zirka" (0:3). The next match, "Avanhard" held a draw with Kyivan "Arsenal" (0:0), and then lost at its home field to "Lokomotyv" out of Vinnytsia (today FC Nyva Vinnytsia) with a score of 0:6. In May 1960, Aleksandr Shchanov was dismissed. The duties of a head coach were performed by his assistant Anatoliy Zhigan, who was approved in this position in July 1960. In its first season in the USSR championship, the team took 16th place out of 17 teams in the 1st zone of the Ukrainian Class B class (second tier) and won relegation playoff against Avanhard Pryluky to stay in the league. In 1961 the team received the name "Desna". According to the results of the 1961 season, Desna took the 5th place in its group and the 10th place in the final of the Ukrainian SSR (class "B"). Among all the Ukrainian teams of the championship of the USSR Chernihiv team was the 13th. In 1962, the team was coached by Yevgeny Goryansky and in 1965 Desna achieved its highest achievement in the Soviet Union era. Defeating six opponents, including class "A" teams – "Shinnik" and "Neftçi", the team reached the 1/8 finals of the USSR Cup, where they lost to "Kairat" in Almaty with a score 3:4. The following season, the team fought for leadership in the first zone of the Ukrainian class "B" – the winners were given the right to fight for securing the second group of the "A" class (later reorganized into the First League). "Desna" skipped forward only Khmelnitsky "Dynamo", and in the overall standings took the 4th place in the championship of the Ukrainian SSR.

=== 1968–1980: SK Chernihiv & Khimik Chernihiv ===
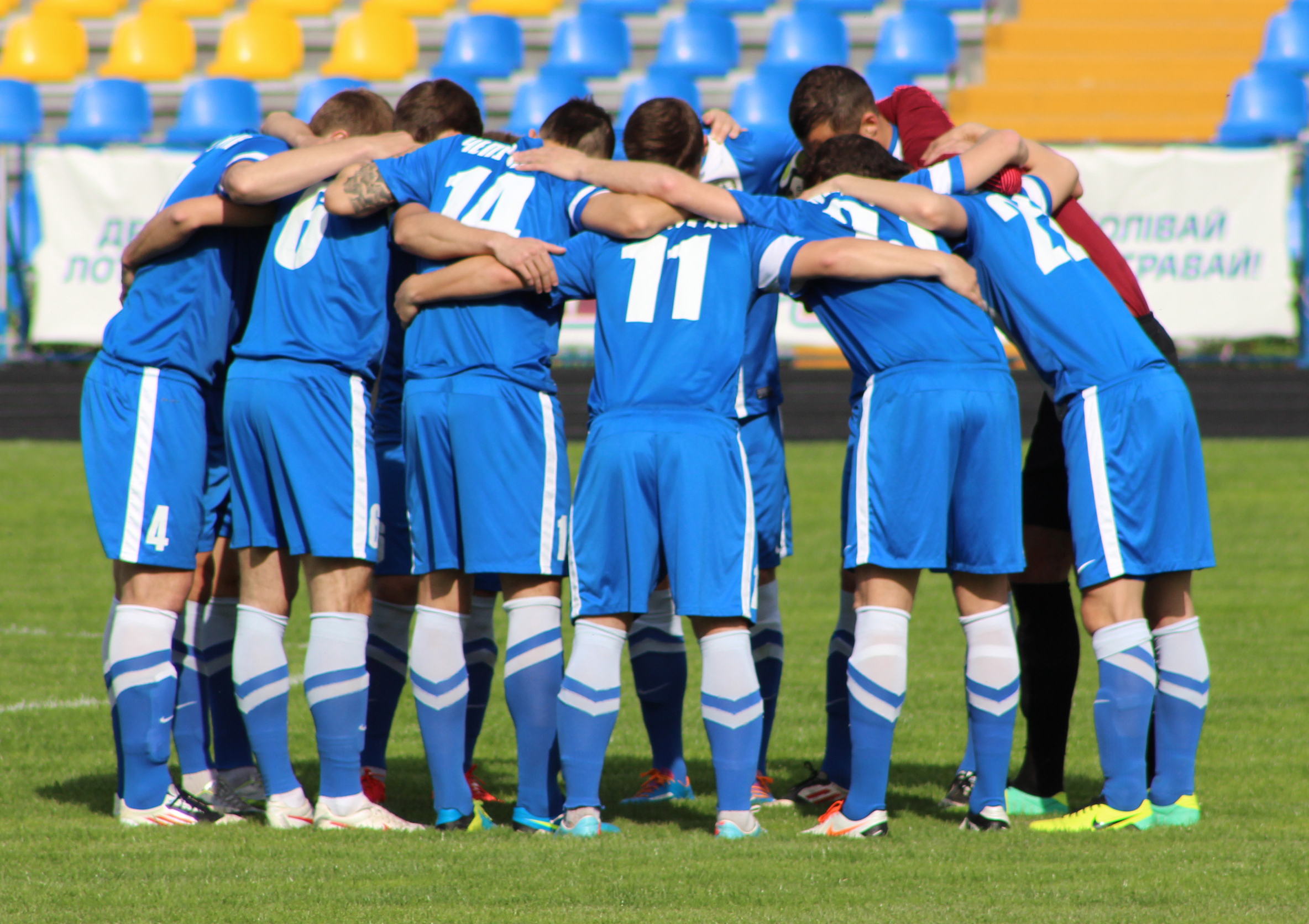
the club of Desna Chernihiv

In 1968, Desna, taking fourth place in the final tournament of the best Ukrainian teams of the "B" class, won a ticket to the second group of the "A" class. At the end of the 1970 season, the team took 11th place among 22 teams, but at the end of the year the decision of the new head of the Chernihiv region was to disband the club. In 1972 the city of Chernihiv was represented by a football team called the "team of Chernihiv city" and later renamed as SC Chernihiv after SKA Kyiv (Sports Club of Army – Kyiv) team moved to Chernihiv and changed its name to SK Chernihiv. The team represented the Armed Forces of Kiev Military District and better known as SKA Kyiv. He represented Desna in the 1972, 1973, 1974, 1975 and had moved back to Kyiv in 1976 as SKA. The 1976 season was its last season at professional level. At the same period of time in 1976 "Khimik" Chernihiv, led by the former player of the Desna, Yukhym Shkolnykov, won the Ukrainian SSR championship among the physical culture teams, thus gaining an opportunity to participate at professional level, the Soviet Second League. In 1977 Desna was revived in place of the amateur club "Khimik Chernihiv" and the composition of which was formed from the former players and the team entered the Soviet Second League. In the mid-1980s, the Stadion Yuri Gagarin capacity was increased to 14,000.

=== 1981–1991 ===
In the season 1981–1982 Oleh Kuznetsov, played for Desna Chernihiv, later he played for Dynamo Kyiv, Rangers, Maccabi Haifa and CSKA-Borysfen Kyiv. He won with UEFA Cup Winners' Cup, Soviet Top League, Soviet Cup. Scottish Premier Division, Scottish League Cup, Scottish Cup with Rangers. He got the final with Soviet Union in UEFA Euro 1988 in the West Germany with 11th and 17th places for Ballon d'Or in 1988 and 1989. In summer 1982, the club signed Oleksandr Ryabokon, the defender and then later he will be appointed as Head Coach in 2008–2009, the team in the 1982 season, tookd the 2nd place in the Ukrainian zone of the Second League, won silver medals of the football championship of the Ukrainian SSR. In 1983–1984 the team was coached by the experience of Yevgeny Goryansky having coached Soviet Union and clubs like FC Dinamo Minsk, FC Dynamo Moscow, FC Dynamo Kyiv and FC Zenit Leningrad. From 1985 to 1986 another coach was Mykhaylo Fomenko was appointed as coach and in 1990 the club got into the semifinal of Cup of the Ukrainian SSR against Naftovyk Okhtyrka. In 1991 he got into the quarterfinal of Cup of the Ukrainian SSR against Kryvbas Kryvyi Rih.

== Transition from Soviet competitions to Ukrainian ==
Ukraine

=== Ultras Desna ===
After the collapse of the Soviet Union and the proclamation of Ukraine's independence, they organized a fan club called "Ultras Desna" date on 1 August 1990, when Chernihiv's fans supported their home club in Kyiv. The first organized departure of fans for the away match of Desna fans was dated back on 1 August 1990, when Chernihiv's fans supported their home club in Kyiv. Four Chernihiv enthusiasts came to the match against SKA Kyiv and, most interestingly, one of them still supports Desna.

=== 1990-1997 ===
The club started playing in the Ukrainian First League and from 1990 until 1993, Yuriy Hruznov, but in the season 1993/94 it was relegated to the third tier. The team won the Ukrainian Second League group tournament in the season 1996–97, the team returned to the Ukrainian First League for two seasons.

=== 1997–1999 ===
From 1997 until 1997, the club played for 2 years in Ukrainian First League, where in the season 1997–98 riched the Round of 16 of the Ukrainian Cup. In the season 1998–99 the club got into the round 32 of the Ukrainian Cup and in Ukrainian First League in the season 1998–99, the club relegated in Ukrainian Second League.

== Ivan Chaus Era (1999-2006) ==
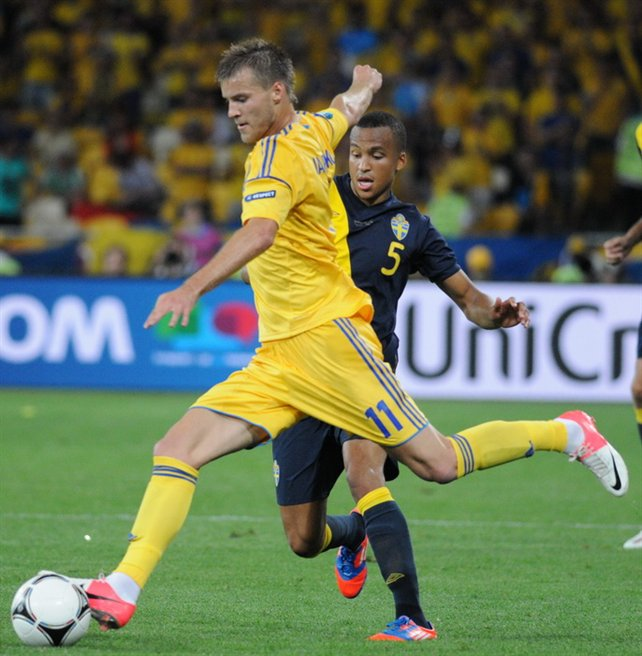
Andriy Yarmolenko in the season 2006/2007 played for FC Desna Chernihiv

=== 1999–2006: Oleksandr Kozhemyachenko ===
In 1999 the club was to the president, Ivan Chaus, a businessman from Chernihiv, that stayed president, for seven seasons, Desna Chernihiv footballers performed in the Ukrainian Second League. In 2002 was appointed as coach Vadym Lazorenko and in 2003 they hired the Serbia and Montenegro defender Milan Zagorac. Desna got second in the Ukrainian Second League with Oleksandr Kozhemyachenko top scores with 21 goals and the season 2005–06 finally won the and Ukrainian Second League and the club return the team to the Ukrainian First League in the season 2006–07. First League in the championship of 2005/06 mentors Olexandr Tomakh and Yukhym Shkolnykov were managed.

=== 2006–2007: Andriy Yarmolenko ===
In summer time 2006, Desna discovered the professional Forward Andriy Yarmolenko from Yunist Chernihiv school in Chernihiv, who later played for who played for FC Dynamo Kyiv, Borussia Dortmund and now plays for West Ham United F.C. He also played for under-21 squad for also participated in the 2008 UEFA European Under-19 Championship qualification. He later participated in qualification and finals of the 2011 UEFA European Under-21 Football Championship. With the Ukraine National Team, in the 2010 FIFA World Cup qualification game against Andorra, Yarmolenko made his first senior appearance for Ukraine and scored in a 5–0 win. On 2 September 2011, in an international friendly against Uruguay in Kharkiv, Yarmolenko set a national team record by scoring 14 seconds into the match, the fastest time in which a Ukraine national team player has scored a goal. UEFA Euro 2016 qualifying, play-off victory over Slovenia to qualify the nation for Euro 2016. In the 2007/08 season Desna took the 4th place in the Ukrainian First League, which at that time was the best result of the team in the Ukrainian championship.

== Oleksiy Savchenko & Pavlo Klymets ==
In August 2007, Oleksiy Savchenko become the president of the club until 2008. Then in November 2008 the he announced that he sold 50% of the club's stock for 10 million hryvnias and the club's co-owner became Ukrainian parliamentarian of Party of Regions Pavlo Klymets who was the owner of "Olimp" company specializing in production of vodka. After the completion of the 2009–10 Ukrainian First League the club failed attestation and deprived of professional status due to the fact that it did not pass the certification, the PFL withdrew their license and the club. but the new authority managed to revive the team and declare it in the Second League. However, the club was reformed with new management as "Sporting Football Club" Desna Chernihiv and was readmitted in the Ukrainian Second League.

== Oleksandr Povorozniuk & Yuriy Tymoshok ==
In spring 2009, Oleksandr Povorozniuk, become President of Desna Chernihiv football club of the city of Chernihiv, until 2010. He became the property of businessman Valeriy Korotkov, involving his business partner Oleksandr Povorozniuk, who first became vice president and president of the club since the summer of 2009. Oleksandr Povorozniuk was ready to invest his own funds in the football club: However, the local authorities, despite promises to support the club and complete the stadium, did nothing. In the summer of 2010, Oleksandr Povorozniuk abandoned Desna Chernihiv due to the club's debts. In 2010, Yuriy Tymoshok become the new president of the club until 2012 and the new Club formed for the 2010–11 season. As coach was appointed Oleksandr Deriberin and he managed to bring the club at the second place in Ukrainian Second League and gained the playoff in the season 2011–12.

== Oleksandr Ryabokon Era (2012–present) ==
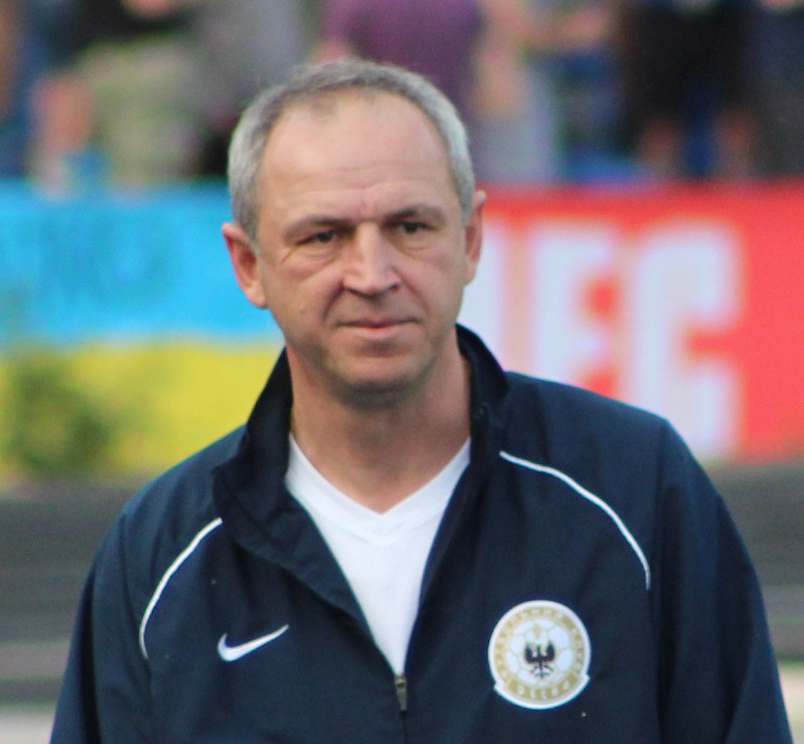
Oleksandr Ryabokon, the head-coach era of FC Desna, since 2012 and elected Best Coach of Ukrainian First League in 2016–17

=== Promotion to Ukrainian First League ===
In the 2012–13 season Desna won the Ukrainian Second League title and rose in the class. Following the results of the championship of 2013/14 the team took the 5th position in the First League. In the Ukrainian Cup in the season 2013–14, the team for the first time in history reached the quarter-finals, having beaten "Metalurh" Zaporizhya (1:1, in a penalty shootout – 5:4) on its field. In the match 1/4 finals with the "Shakhtar" "Desna" lost with a score of 0:2. In the summer 2016, the club changed its logo and appealed to its fans to choose a new emblem of the club, voting on Desna's official Facebook page until July 22. In the same year the club signed the new striker Oleksandr Filippov, from Avanhard Kramatorsk and in 2016/17 season Desna won the silver medals of the First League and for the first time in history gained the right to compete in the Premier League. At the same time Yevheniy Belych was called 4 times in Ukraine U16 and became the first player belonging to Desna to be called in Ukraine U16. The coach Oleksandr Ryabokon was elected best coach of the Ukrainian First League in the season 2016–17. However, on 1 June 2017, it was announced that Desna was denied in receiving license to play in the top division. The argument was that the club is not able to provide guarantees for an adequate financing of infrastructure. In reality, the problem was not only in half-shady financial irregularities, but also shady ownership of the club. The license was received by NK Veres Rivne, the third-placed team during the last season in the second-tier division. Both clubs FC Desna Chernihiv and NK Veres Rivne did not play at their home stadiums in the 2016–17 Ukrainian First League. The first one played in Kyiv at the Obolon Arena, while the other one played in Varash, at the Izotop Stadium of the Rivne Nuclear Power Plant. The administration of Desna released a letter of protest before a meeting of FFU representative. On 2 June 2017, it was announced about the final composition of the clubs and calendar for the upcoming season. In summer 2017 FC Desna signed Temur Partsvania that in 2009 he won the UEFA European Under-19 Championship in 2009 with Ukraine-19.

== The Levin Era (2017–present) ==
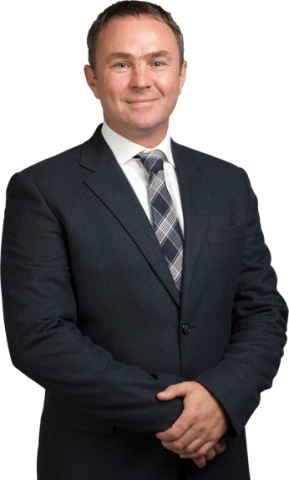
Volodymyr Levin, the president who managed to bring the club in Ukrainian Premier League.

=== Promotion to Ukrainian Premier League ===
In October 2017 the club's president Aleksei Chebotarev (Oleksiy Chebotaryov) resigned for being wanted by the Ukrainian law enforcement and ran from Ukraine, the club's ownership was passed to Volodymyr Levin. In particular, the former president is in suspicion to be involved in organization of crime groups that were involved in killing and kidnappings during the Euromaidan events in Kyiv in fall-winter of 2013–14. Some followers of football were pointing out that the club was proudly demonstrating the club's supervisory board without showing any information about the club's owner (a common issue among most Ukrainian professional clubs), three members out of 14 were also current members of the UAF Executive Committee including Hennadiy Prokopovych and Artem Frankov as well as the president of the Ukrainian PFL Serhiy Makarov. The fan also signed and an electronic petition with a request to return Desna Chernihiv to the Ukrainian Premier League has been registered on the official website of the President of Ukraine, Petro Poroshenko. According with the results of the 2017/18 season Desna won the bronze medals in Ukrainian First League of the 2017–18 and gained the right to compete in the Ukrainian Premier League through the play-offs against Zirka Kropyvnytskyi and got promoted to the Ukrainian Premier League for the first time in their history. The captain Denys Favorov was elected Best Player Ukrainian First League in the season 2017–18. The team got into the quarterfinals of the Ukrainian Cup in the season 2017–18 against Dynamo Kyiv.In 2018 in order to reinforce the team, the club signed the experienced goalkeeper Yevhen Past and Artem Favorov (the brother of Denys Favorov).

=== 4th place in Ukrainian Premier League ===
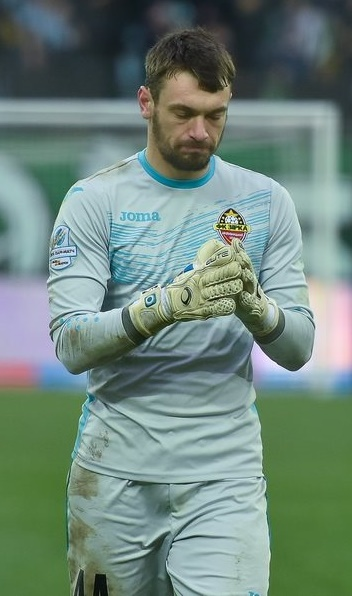
Yevhen Past, the goalkeeper with most clean sheets in Ukrainian Premier League in 2019–20 (shared with Andriy Pyatov)

In the season 2019–20, the club started very well, in particular the striker Oleksandr Filippov was in great form scoring many goals in the league. In January the club decided to reinforce the defence, in January 2020, they hired the Estonian international Joonas Tamm and the club during the season 2019–20 got again into the quarterfinals of the Ukrainian Cup for the second time of the history of the club. In Premier League in the season 2019–20, Desna got the 4th place, through the play-offs for the Championship round table, winning also against club like Dynamo Kyiv in Kyiv at the NSC Olimpiyskiy on 15 September 2019 for 1–2 (Vladyslav Kalitvintsev 40', Artem Besyedin 49, Oleksandr Filippov 56).

Due to the COVID-19 pandemic in Ukraine and based on resolutions of the Cabinet of Ukraine and the UAF Executive Committee, on 11 March 2020 the UPL adopted a decision to conduct games of the league's championship as well as under-21 and under-19 championships without spectators until 3 April 2020 (the first two rounds of the season's second stage). Desna Chernihiv, started the play-offs for the Championship round table, 15 March 2020 with Dynamo Kyiv in Kyiv drawing 1–1 at the NSC Olimpiyskiy. Due to pandemic situation worldwide, the League was temporally suspended. The play-off started again 30 May 2020 and FC Desna Chernihiv won away 0–2 against FC Kolos Kovalivka and 5–1 away against FC Oleksandriya on 14 June 2020. Next match Desna lost 3–2 against Shakhtar Donetsk 6 June 2020. Desna made incredible performance winning 5–1 away against FC Oleksandriya 15 June 2020. On 21 June 2020, the club lost 1–2 at home against Zorya Luhansk and one week later FC Desna won 3–2 at home against Dynamo Kyiv in an incredible match . On 5 July 2020 the club won 5–1 at home against FC Kolos Kovalivka and be the team that scored most goals during the play off Wednesday 8 July 2020, Desna qualified mathematically for the Europa League third qualifying round, for the first time in the history of the Club since 1960, following the victory of the Ukrainian Cup by Dynamo Kyiv against Vorskla Poltava and being the third best attach and the third best defence in the season. Also Yevhen Past was the goalkeeper with most clean sheets in 11 matches together with the international Ukrainian goalkeeper Andriy Pyatov. In summer 2020, Illya Shevtsov was promoted to the new team as he become top scorer of Ukrainian Premier League Reserves in the season 2019–20 with 13 goals. During the summer transfer window, the captain Denys Favorov, left the club after 4 years with big surprise of many people as the club didn't extend the contract and player was elected Ukrainian Footballer of the Year in 2020.

=== Europa League third qualifying round & Fair Play prize ===
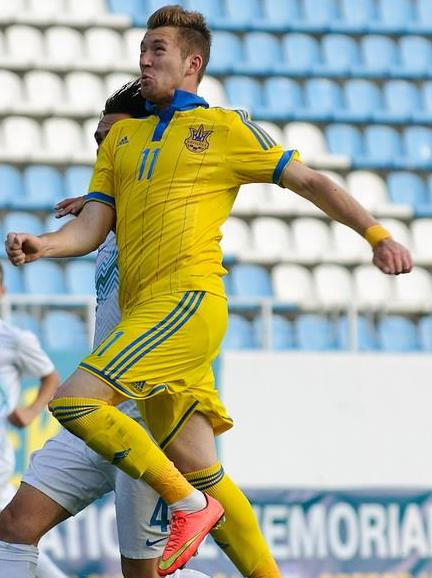
Denys Bezborodko from Chernihiv been elected Desna Chernihiv Player of the Year in 2018, and in 2022

. At the start of the new season after two matches, the striker Oleksandr Filippov was sold for 1.5 million of euro, becoming the most expensive player sold by the club, also with some Italian clubs interested in the player. After the draw for the Europa League third qualifying round, Desna got the German team VfL Wolfsburg and on 24 September 2020 they lost 2–0 at the AOK Stadion. In October 2020 Yukhym Konoplya (on loan from Shakhtar Donetsk), has been called for the Ukraine national football team, for friendly match against France and UEFA Nations League matches against Germany and Spain on 7, 10 and 13 October 2020 respectively, becoming the first player of playing in Desna Chernihiv, called in the Ukraine National Team. On 16 December 2020, Denys Bezborodko returned to Desna from Oleksandriya and in January 2021, the team has won the Fair Play prize in the UPL as the best team in the season 2019–20. The award ceremony was attended by the President of the Ukrainian Football Association, UEFA Executive Committee member Andriy Pavelko, UAF First Vice President Oleh Protasov, UAF Referees Committee Chairman Luciano Luci, UPL Executive Director Yevhen Dyky and PFL President Oleksandr Kadenko. In the meantime Yevheniy Belych and Illya Shevtsov they have been sent on loan to Dinaz Vyshhorod and Inhulets Petrove until the rest of the season to get more matches playing with experience. In December 2020 the club shot a film-story about FC "Desna" called "FC Desna "60 years", where viewers will see the idols of generations - Yuriy Hruznov, Oleh Kuznetsov, Andriy Yarmolenko and many other footballers whose careers are connected with the Desna Chernihiv. The team acquired Constantin Dima, the first Romanian player and Artem Sukhotskyi to reinforce the defence and as mitfield the called back a previews desna player Yevhen Chepurnenko. The very first half of the season was very successfully but in the second part of the season the club lost their main top scored Andriy Totovytskyi and Pylyp Budkivskyi as they got injured and the team finished 6th in the Ukrainian Premier League. In summer of 2021 the club fails to qualify for the cups and according with the president of the club, Volodymyr Levin, said that the club has a 4-month debt to the players for the payment of salaries and the management of the UPL club decided to cut the budget for the 2021/22 season. A number of players have left Desna, like Yevhen Past, Andriy Hitchenko, Joonas Tamm, Andriy Mostovyi and Vladyslav Ohirya.

=== Reorganization ===
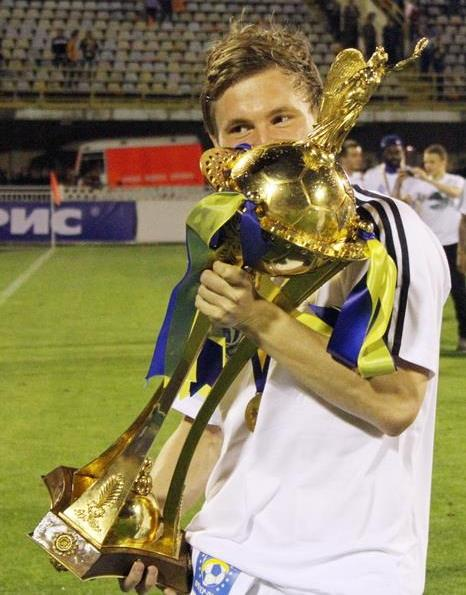
Vladyslav Kalitvintsev, the first player belonging to Desna Chernihiv to be called in the Ukraine national football team.

The club begins the rejuvenation of the team, leaving starting players who have made the history of the club and begins to develop the team's academy and choose some of Desna 2 players, like Yevheniy Belych and Illya Shevtsov that they returned from loan. The team was requalified and the first step was the extension of the contract with Yehor Kartushov and elected captain, then new young players has been added into the club like Oleksandr Safronov, Taras Zaviyskyi, Yevhen Tsymbalyuk and Vikentiy Voloshyn on loan from Dynamo Kyiv. Second the club also added experiences players like Yevhen Selin and Serhiy Bolbat on loan from Shakhtar Donetsk, plus Yevhen Khacheridi was on view for three weeks but after that, on 25 August 2021, Khacheredi left Desna training camp after spending about three weeks in the location of the Desna Chernihiv, with which he maintained training form, the parties did not come to a common denominator regarding the signing of the contract. Khacheridi left the training camp of Oleksandr Ryabokon's team on his own initiative. It is unknown whether the search for a new club will continue. The team changed more than half with 18 players left and the same number added into the club with good results at the beginning of the season to the surprise of many people and the press. In particular was Denys Bezborodko and Vladyslav Kalitvintsev with important pass for the striker and in September he has been included in the reserve team of Ukraine national football team against Finland, becoming the first player belonging to Desna to be called in the Ukraine national football team. In the squad was also included Serhiy Bolbat (on loan from Shakhtar Donetsk). On 27 September 2021, the president Volodymyr Levin, spoke about the situation with the wage arrears of the players in the club and confirmed that the wages started to be paid and also the wage arrears ensuring that no one has problems. He stated that Desna is one big friendly family, which we play football and in October 2021 the financial situation of the club started to be significantly better. In October 2021, a new interesting research is brought by the Football Observatory (CIES), show up that Desna and Athletic Bilbao (Spain) are the only teams in Europe without foreigners players. Victor Mukha before to die, he published the book "The historical path of Desna". The author of seven books about the club did not have time to see his eighth book. In January 2022, Vladyslav Kalitvintsev moved to Oleksandriya in Ukrainian Premier League, where Desna Chernihiv received 500,000, becoming the second most expensive player sold by the club with Oleksiy Hutsulyak. On 11 February 2022 the team flew to Turkey bringing new young players like Georgios Ermidis, Danyil Pus, Artem Khatskevich, Denys Demyanenko, Dzhilindo Bezghubchenko, Bohdan Sheiko, Serhiy Makarenko and Oleksiy Pashchenko from Desna-3 Chernihiv and Desna-2 Chernihiv. On 11 February 2022, the team departed for the preparation in Turkey, where they played against Velež Mostar, Torpedo Kutaisi, Kryvbas Kryvyi Rih in Antalya in a friendly match.

== Siege of Chernihiv ==
=== Gagarin Stadium Damaged ===
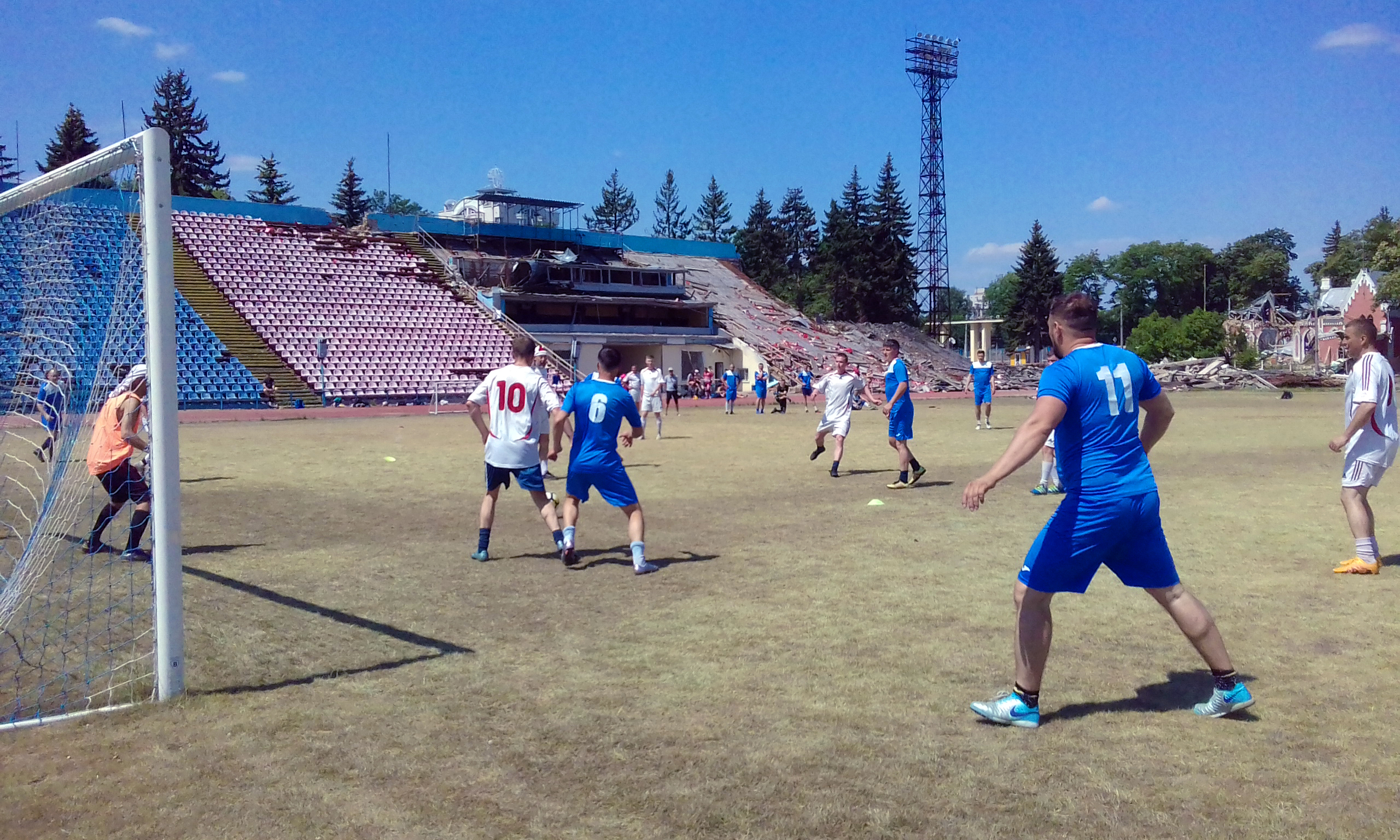
Match Desna-Albion during a charity tournament Matsuta Open at the Gagarin stadium destroyed by the Russian invaders. Chernihiv, 11 June 2022

On 24 February 2022, during the 2022 Russian invasion of Ukraine, the Ukrainian Premier League was suspended due to the Russian invasion of Ukraine and in the city of Chernihiv was under siege by the Russian Armed Forces according to the Russian Ministry of Defense, The team couldn't return to his home city and on 11 March 2022, a Russian airstrike also damaged the training ground Chernihiv Arena and in the same day the also Chernihiv Stadium, the main stadium of the club with the library beside were badly damaged by a Russian airstrike. After the shelling, the arena turned into ruins, but a lot of equipment remained inside, but looters robbed the Desna home arena, which had been bombed by Russian occupiers the day before. The looters took advantage of the situation by snatching TVs, rehabilitation devices and other things, the Bombardier YouTube channel reported. The video also shows the office of Desna head coach Oleksandr Ryabokon - a funnel 3–4 meters deep can be seen from the window. Due to the war and the stop of the Ukrainian Premier League the medfield Andriy Dombrovskyi moved on loan to Termalica Nieciecza in Ekstraklasa and the striker Denys Bezborodko went on loan to Gyirmót in Nemzeti Bajnokság I for three months. Also the goalkeeper Dmytro Sydorenko moved to Izolator Boguchwała and the defender Oleksandr Safronov moved to Nafta 1903 The manager of Desna Chernihiv Dmitry Doroshko spoke about the current state of affairs in the Chernihiv "Desna" and the prospects of the club. He shared details of the state of his club and what his future prospects are. Doroshko noted that, unfortunately, today there are almost no football clubs in Ukraine, except for the capital's Dynamo and Donetsk's Shakhtar, which participate in charity matches organized in support of Ukraine, which was not affected by the war. When the tragic pages in the history of Ukraine began, when the Russian Federation declared war, Desna Chernihiv was at a training camp held in Turkey. Of the entire team, only Yevhen Selin, who is volunteering, decided to return to Ukraine. He was not afraid to go to Chernihiv and take the necessary help to the APU.At the moment, all Desna players keep in touch with each other, constantly asking questions about the condition of the football stadium (which was practically destroyed by the occupiers), as well as helping with money matters. Doroshko noted that thanks to their players, they managed to buy a lot of equipment for the Ukrainian army. At the moment, the club has to say goodbye to players whose contracts have expired. And those players whose contracts are valid, go to other clubs on lease, if they can find a place so that they do not wait until the summer.
