= 2021–22 FC Desna Chernihiv season =

Desna Chernihiv
2021–22 season
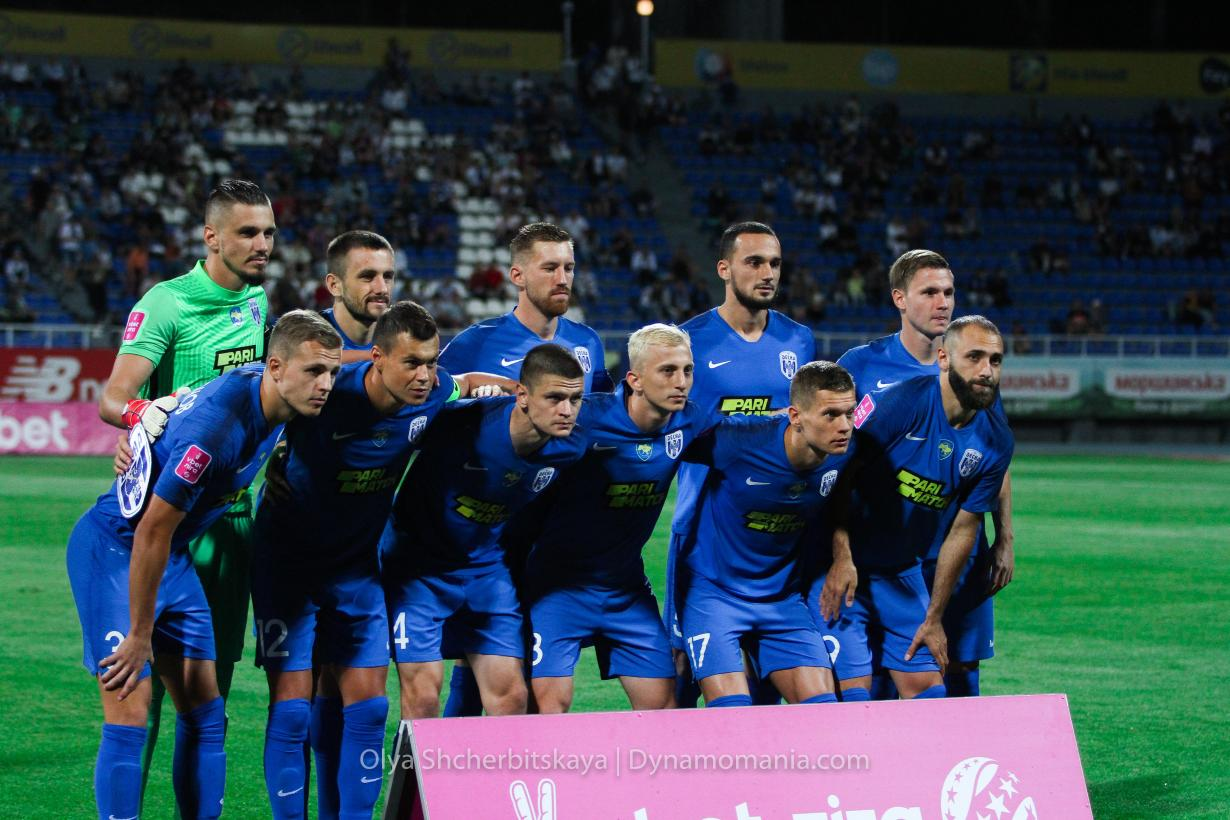
- Chairman: Volodymyr Levin
- Manager: Oleksandr Ryabokon
- Stadium: Chernihiv Stadium
- Ukrainian Premier League: 7th
- Ukrainian Cup: Round of 32
- Top goalscorer: Denys Bezborodko (7 goals)
Home colours	Away colours

The 2021–22 season was FC Desna Chernihiv's 61st season in existence and the club's fourth consecutive season in the top flight of Ukrainian football. In summer of 2021 the club fails to qualify for the cups and according with the president of the club, Volodymyr Levin, said that the club has a 4-month debt to the players for the payment of salaries and the management of the UPL club decided to cut the budget for the 2021/22 season. A number of players have left Desna. The club begins the rejuvenation of the team, leaving starting players who have made the history of the club and begins to develop the team's academy and choose some of Desna 2 and Desna 3 players. On 15 July 2021 the cooperation with the sponsor Parimatch was extended. In summer 2021, the team was requalified and new young players has been added into the club with good results at the first four matches in Ukrainian Premier League.

== Players ==
=== Squad information ===
As of 18 February 2022

Squad no.	Name	Nationality	Position	Date of birth (age)
Goalkeepers
1	Dmytro Sydorenko^{List B & C}	(Ukraine)	GK	12 November 2002 (aged 18)
21	Roman Mysak	(Ukraine)	GK	9 September 1991 (aged 29)
62	Illya Karavashchenko^{List B & C}	(Ukraine)	GK	25 June 2001 (aged 20)
72	Ihor Lytovka	(Ukraine)	GK	5 June 1988 (aged 33)
Defenders
2	Vadym Zhuk	(Ukraine)	DF	15 April 1991 (aged 30)
3	Oleksandr Safronov	(Ukraine)	DF	11 June 1999 (aged 22)
4	Yevhen Tsymbalyuk	(Ukraine)	DF	19 June 1996 (aged 25)
5	Oleksandr Masalov	(Ukraine)	DF	22 January 1997 (aged 24)
6	Kristian Bilovar	(Ukraine)	DF	5 February 2001 (aged 20)
6	Oleksiy Kovtun	(Ukraine)	DF	5 February 1995 (aged 26)
23	Danyil Pus ^{List C}	(Ukraine)	DF	2 January 2003 (aged 18)
33	Yevhen Selin	(Ukraine)	DF	9 May 1988 (aged 33)
Midfielders
7	Serhiy Makarenko ^{List C}	(Ukraine)	MF	21 March 2003 (aged 18)
7	Oleksiy Hutsulyak	(Ukraine)	MF	25 December 1997 (aged 23)
7	Serhiy Bolbat	(Ukraine)	MF	13 June 1993 (aged 28)
8	Andriy Dombrovskyi	(Ukraine)	MF	12 August 1995 (aged 25)
9	Levan Arveladze	(Ukraine)	MF	12 August 1993 (aged 27)
10	Dzhilindo Bezghubchenko ^{List C}	(Ukraine)	MF	7 February 2003 (aged 18)
10	Andriy Totovytskyi	(Ukraine)	MF	20 January 1993 (aged 28)
11	Vladyslav Kalitvintsev	(Ukraine)	MF	4 January 1993 (aged 28)
12	Yehor Kartushov (Captain)	(Ukraine)	MF	5 January 1991 (aged 30)
15	Vikentiy Voloshyn (on loan from Dynamo Kyiv)	(Ukraine)	MF	17 April 2001 (aged 20)
16	Yevheniy Belych	(Ukraine)	MF	6 January 2001 (aged 20)
17	Taras Zaviyskyi	(Ukraine)	MF	13 April 1995 (aged 25)
28	Giorgios Ermides ^{List B & C}	(Greece)	MF	8 June 2001 (aged 20)
80	Bohdan Sheiko ^{List C}	(Ukraine)	MF	27 November 2003 (aged 17)
80	Vladlen Yurchenko	(Ukraine)	MF	22 January 1994 (aged 27)
89	Renat Mochulyak ^{List B}	(Ukraine)	MF	15 February 1998 (aged 23)
91	Pavlo Shostka ^{List C}	(Ukraine)	MF	24 June 2002 (aged 19)
	Artem Khatskevich ^{List C}	(Belarus)	MF	16 June 2003 (aged 18)
	Andriy Slotyuk ^{List B}	(Ukraine)	MF	31 May 1999 (aged 22)
Forwards
11	Oleksiy Pashchenko ^{List B}	(Ukraine)	FW	29 June 2003 (aged 18)
19	Denys Demyanenko ^{List B}	(Ukraine)	FW	5 July 2000 (aged 20)
20	Denys Bezborodko	(Ukraine)	FW	31 May 1994 (aged 27)
28	Pylyp Budkivskyi	(Ukraine)	FW	10 March 1992 (aged 29)
77	Maksym Dehtyarov	(Ukraine)	FW	30 May 1993 (aged 28)
90	Illya Shevtsov	(Ukraine)	FW	13 April 2000 (aged 21)

== Transfers ==
=== In ===
Date	Pos.	Player	Age	Moving from	Type	Fee	Source
Summer
28 May 2021	MF	(Ukraine) Illya Shevtsov	21	(Ukraine) Inhulets Petrove	Transfer	Loan Return	
28 May 2021	MF	(Ukraine) Yevheniy Belych	20	(Ukraine) Desna-2 Chernihiv	Transfer	Free	
28 May 2021	MF	(Ukraine) Andriy Slotyuk	22	(Ukraine) Metal Kharkiv	Transfer	Loan Return	
1 July 2021	GK	(Ukraine) Illya Karavashchenko	20	(Ukraine) Desna-2 Chernihiv	Transfer	Free	
14 July 2021	DF	(Ukraine) Oleksandr Safronov	22	(Ukraine) SC Dnipro-1	Transfer	Free	
15 July 2021	MF	(Ukraine) Yevhen Selin	33	(Cyprus) Anorthosis Famagusta	Transfer	Free	
15 July 2021	FW	(Ukraine) Taras Zaviyskyi	26	(Ukraine) Olimpik Donetsk	Transfer	Free	
16 July 2021	DF	(Ukraine) Yevhen Tsymbalyuk	25	(Ukraine) Olimpik Donetsk	Transfer	Free	
16 July 2021	GK	(Ukraine) Dmytro Sydorenko	19	(Ukraine) Desna-3 Chernihiv	Transfer	Free	
22 July 2021	DF	(Ukraine) Pavlo Shostka	20	(Ukraine) Desna-3 Chernihiv	Transfer	Free	
22 July 2021	DF	(Ukraine) Vadym Zhuk	30	(Ukraine) Horishni Plavni	Transfer	Free	
23 July 2021	MF	(Ukraine) Vikentiy Voloshyn	20	(Ukraine) Dynamo Kyiv	Transfer	Loan	
23 July 2021	DF	(Ukraine) Kristian Bilovar	20	(Ukraine) Dynamo Kyiv	Transfer	Loan	
5 August 2021	DF	(Ukraine) Oleksandr Masalov	24	(Moldova) Dinamo-Auto	Transfer	Free	
5 August 2021	GK	(Ukraine) Roman Mysak	29	(Ukraine) Rukh Lviv	Transfer	Free	
12 August 2021	MF	(Ukraine) Renat Mochulyak	23	(Ukraine) Desna-2 Chernihiv	Transfer	Free	
12 August 2021	MF	(Ukraine) Denys Demyanenko	21	(Ukraine) Desna-2 Chernihiv	Transfer	Free	
20 August 2021	MF	(Ukraine) Serhiy Bolbat	28	(Ukraine) Shakhtar Donetsk	Transfer	Loan	
1 September 2021	MF	(Belarus) Artem Khatskevich	21	(Ukraine) Dynamo Kyiv	Transfer	Loan	
10 September 2021	DF	(Ukraine) Oleksiy Kovtun	26	(Ukraine) Mynai	Transfer	Free	
30 September 2021	DF	(Ukraine) Vladlen Yurchenko	27	(Ukraine) Zorya Luhansk	Transfer	Free	
10 October 2021	GK	(Ukraine) Illya Karavashchenko	20	(Ukraine) VPK-Ahro Shevchenkivka	Transfer	Loan Return	
Winter
11 February 2022	DF	(Ukraine) Danyil Pus	18	(Ukraine) Desna-3 Chernihiv	Transfer	Free	
11 February 2022	DF	(Belarus) Artem Khatskevich	18	(Ukraine) Desna-3 Chernihiv	Transfer	Free	
11 February 2022	MF	(Ukraine) Dzhilindo Bezghubchenko	18	(Ukraine) Desna-2 Chernihiv	Transfer	Free	
11 February 2022	MF	(Greece) Georgios Ermidis	20	(Ukraine) Desna-2 Chernihiv	Transfer	Free	
11 February 2022	MF	(Ukraine) Denys Demyanenko	21	(Ukraine) Desna-3 Chernihiv	Transfer	Free	
11 February 2022	MF	(Ukraine) Bohdan Sheiko	21	(Ukraine) Desna-2 Chernihiv	Transfer	Free	
11 February 2022	MF	(Ukraine) Serhiy Makarenko	21	(Ukraine) Desna-3 Chernihiv	Transfer	Free	
11 February 2022	FW	(Ukraine) Oleksiy Pashchenko	21	(Ukraine) Desna-2 Chernihiv	Transfer	Free	

=== Out ===
Date	Pos.	Player	Age	Moving to	Type	Fee	Source
Summer
19 May 2021	DF	(Ukraine) Bohdan Biloshevskyi	21	(Ukraine) Dynamo Kyiv	Transfer	Loan Return	
22 May 2021	DF	(Ukraine) Yukhym Konoplya	21	(Ukraine) Shakhtar Donetsk	Transfer	Loan Return	
28 May 2021	DF	(Estonia) Joonas Tamm	29	(Ukraine) Vorskla Poltava	Transfer	Free	
31 May 2021	DF	(Ukraine) Pavlo Polehenko	26	(Ukraine) Inhulets Petrove	Transfer	Free	
1 June 2021	DF	(Ukraine) Maksym Imerekov	30	(Ukraine) Zorya Luhansk	Transfer	Free	
15 June 2021	DF	(Ukraine) Andriy Mostovyi	33	(Ukraine) Kryvbas Kryvyi Rih	Transfer	Free	
24 June 2021	MF	(Ukraine) Vladyslav Ohirya	31	(Ukraine) Polissya Zhytomyr	Transfer	Free	
1 July 2021	DF	(Ukraine) Andriy Hitchenko	36	(Ukraine) Polissya Zhytomyr	Transfer	Free	
4 July 2021	MF	(Ukraine) Oleksandr Volkov	32	(Ukraine) LNZ Cherkasy	Transfer	Free	
5 July 2021	MF	(Ukraine) Yevhen Chepurnenko	31	(Ukraine) Dinaz Vyshhorod	Transfer	Free	
5 July 2021	GK	(Ukraine) Yevhen Past	33	(Ukraine) SC Dnipro-1	Transfer	Free	
7 July 2021	MF	(Ukraine) Vitaliy Yermakov	29	(Ukraine) Metalist 1925 Kharkiv	Transfer	Free	
16 July 2021	DF	(Romania) Constantin Dima	21	(Romania) UTA Arad	Transfer	Free	
16 July 2021	DF	(Ukraine) Artem Sukhotskyi	29	Unattached			
23 July 2021	GK	(Ukraine) Illya Karavashchenko	20	(Ukraine) VPK-Ahro Shevchenkivka	Transfer	On Loan	
15 August 2021	MF	(Ukraine) Oleksiy Hutsulyak	23	(Ukraine) SC Dnipro-1	Transfer	500.000 Euro	
3 September 2021	DF	(Ukraine) Kristian Bilovar	20	(Ukraine) Dynamo Kyiv	Transfer	Loan Return	
1 October 2021	MF	(Ukraine) Renat Mochulyak	23	(Ukraine) Livyi Bereh Kyiv	Transfer	Free	
1 October 2021	DF	(Ukraine) Pavlo Shostka	19	(Ukraine) Dnipro Cherkasy	Transfer	Free	
Winter
21 December 2021	MF	(Ukraine) Andriy Totovytskyi	28	(Ukraine) Kolos Kovalivka	Transferred	Free	
22 December 2021	MF	(Ukraine) Serhiy Bolbat	28	(Ukraine) Shakhtar Donetsk	Transfer	Loan Return	
22 December 2021	FW	(Ukraine) Pylyp Budkivskyi	29	(Ukraine) Polissya Zhytomyr	Transfer	Free	
22 December 2021	MF	(Ukraine) Vladlen Yurchenko	27	(Latvia) Riga FC	Transfer	Free	
28 December 2021	MF	(Ukraine) Vladyslav Kalitvintsev	28	(Ukraine) Oleksandriya	Transfer	500.000 Euro	
8 January 2022	DF	(Ukraine) Oleksiy Kovtun	26	Unattached	Transfer	Free	
18 February 2022	MF	(Ukraine) Yehor Kartushov	31	(Ukraine) Metalist Kharkiv	Transfer	Free	
18 March 2022	MF	(Ukraine) Yevheniy Belych	21	(Poland) Piast Nowa Ruda	Transfer	Free	
18 March 2022	MF	(Ukraine) Serhiy Makarenko	21	(Poland) Piast Nowa Ruda	Transfer	Free	
25 March 2022	MF	(Ukraine) Andriy Dombrovskyi	26	(Poland) Termalica Nieciecza	Transfer	On Loan	
26 March 2022	FW	(Ukraine) Denys Bezborodko	27	(Hungary) Gyirmót	Transfer	On Loan	
26 March 2022	DF	(Ukraine) Oleksandr Safronov	27	(Slovenia) Nafta 1903	Transfer	On Loan	
26 March 2022	GK	(Ukraine) Dmytro Sydorenko	19	(Poland) Izolator Boguchwała	Transfer	On Loan	
7 April 2022	MF	(Ukraine) Levan Arveladze	29	(Georgia (country)) Torpedo Kutaisi	Transfer	Free	
23 May 2022	MF	(Ukraine) Denys Demyanenko	20	(Poland) Cosmos Nowotaniec	Transfer	Free	

== Pre-season and friendlies ==
Win Draw Loss

10 July 2021 Friendly	Desna Chernihiv (Ukraine)	3-0	(Ukraine) FC Chernihiv	Chernihiv
EET (UTC+02:00)	Budkivskyi; Budkivskyi; Bezborodko			Stadium: Stadion Yuri Gagarin

14 July 2021 Friendly	Desna Chernihiv (Ukraine)	4-2	(Ukraine) VPK-Ahro Shevchenkivka	Chernihiv
EET (UTC+18:00)	Kalitvintsev 16'; Kalitvintsev 22'; Safronov 31'; Arveladze 47'		Kulish 34'; Litvinenko 57'	Stadium: Stadion Yuri Gagarin

15 July 2021 Friendly	Desna Chernihiv (Ukraine)	2-2	(Ukraine) SC Chaika	Chernihiv
EET (UTC+18:00)	Bezborodko 11'; Shevtsov 64' (p)		Ruslani 19'; Lyha 47'	Stadium: Stadion Yuri Gagarin

18 July 2021 Friendly	Desna Chernihiv (Ukraine)	2-0	(Ukraine) Veres Rivne	Bucha
EET (UTC+18:00)	Totovytskyi 9'; Zaviyskyi 47'			Stadium: Stadium Yuvileinyi

19 July 2021 Friendly	LNZ Cherkasy (Ukraine)	2-0	(Ukraine) Desna Chernihiv	Kyiv
EET (UTC+18:00)	Zamurenko 54'; Voytsekhovskyi 73'			Stadium: Stadium in Shchaslyve (Arsenal-Knyazha Arena)

5 September 2021 Friendly	Kolos Kovalivka (Ukraine)	2-1	(Ukraine) Desna Chernihiv	Kovalivka
EET (UTC+18:00)	Sakiv; Bohdanov	Report	Zaviyskyi	Stadium: Kolos Stadium

15 November 2021 Friendly	Desna Chernihiv (Ukraine)	1-0	(Ukraine) Olimpik Donetsk	Kyiv
EET (UTC+18:00)	Budkivskyi 71' (p)	Report		Stadium: Bannikov Stadium

25 January 2022 Friendly	Livyi Bereh Kyiv (Ukraine)	1-1	(Ukraine) Desna Chernihiv	Kyiv
EET (UTC+15:30)	Ulyanytskyi 80'	Report	Shevtsov 71'	Stadium: Stadion "Livyi Bereh", Hnidyn

29 January 2022 Friendly	Obolon Kyiv (Ukraine)	1-0	(Ukraine) Desna Chernihiv	Kyiv
EET (UTC+18:00)	Oleksiy Shchebetun 6'	Report		Stadium: Obolon Arena

5 February 2022 Friendly	FC Chernihiv (Ukraine)	1-0	(Ukraine) Desna Chernihiv	Chernihiv
EET (UTC+15:30)	Serdyuk 38'	Report		Stadium: Yunist Stadium

14 February 2022 Friendly	Velež Mostar (Bosnia and Herzegovina)	2-1	(Ukraine) Desna Chernihiv	Antalya
EET (UTC+18:00)	Haskić 4'; Safronov 9' (o.g.)	Report	Arveladze 40'	Stadium: Winter sports camps

17 February 2022 Friendly	Desna Chernihiv (Ukraine)	2-0	(Georgia (country)) Torpedo Kutaisi	Antalya
EET (UTC+20:30)	Bezborodko 10'; Shevtsov 60' (p)	Report		Stadium: Miracle Sport Center

20 February 2022 Friendly	Kryvbas Kryvyi Rih (Ukraine)	0-2	(Ukraine) Desna Chernihiv	Antalya
EET (UTC+16:00)		Report	Selin 22'; Bezborodko 31'; Voloshyn (penalty missed) 45 (p)	Stadium: Asteria Football Center, Belek

== Competitions ==
=== Overall ===
Competition	Started round	Current position	Final position	First match	Last match
Premier League	Matchday 1	—	—	25 July 2021	21 April 2022
Cup	Round of 16	Round of 32 (1/16)	Round of 32 (1/16)	September 2021	September 2021

Updated to match played 26 May 2021
Source: Competitions

=== Overview ===
Competition	Record							
Competition	G	W	D	L	GF	GA	GD	Win %
Premier League	0	0	0	0	0	0	+0	—
Cup	1	0	0	1	1	2	−1	0.00
Total	0	0	0	0	0	0	+0	—

Updated to match played 21 September 2021
Source: Competitions

=== Ukrainian Premier League ===
==== League table ====
Pos	Team	Pld	W	D	L	GF	GA	GD	Pts	Qualification or relegation
5	Vorskla Poltava	18	9	6	3	30	18	+12	33	Qualification for the Europa Conference League second qualifying round
6	Oleksandriya	18	7	5	6	19	16	+3	26	
7	Desna Chernihiv (Note: Desna Chernihiv and Mariupol confirmed that they cannot compete next season due to destroyed infrastructure and the difficult situation in their cities.)	18	7	4	7	22	27	−5	25	Membership suspended after season
8	Kolos Kovalivka	18	7	3	8	14	23	−9	24	
9	Veres Rivne	18	6	5	7	15	20	−5	23	

Source: upl.ua
Rules for classification: 1) Points; 2) Head-to-head points; 3) Head-to-head goal difference; 4) Head-to-head higher number of goals scored; 5) Goal difference; 6) higher number of goals scored; 7) Draw or "Golden match" if two teams tied for title (Article 22, paragraph 3).

==== Results by round ====
Round	1	2	3	4	5	6	7	8	9	10	11	12	13	14	15	16	17	18	19	20	21	22	23	24	25	26	27	28	29	30
Ground	H	A	H	H	A	A	H	A	H	A	H	A	H	A	H	A	H	A	A	H	H	A	H	A	H	A	H	A	H	A
Result	W	W	W	W	L	L	D	W	L	L	D	D	L	W	L	W	D	L												
Position	1	1	1	1	2	4	4	3	6	7	7	8	9	7	8	6	7	7												

Updated to match(es) played on 28 November 2021. Source: 1
A = Away; H = Home; W = Win; D = Draw; L = Loss

==== Results ====
25 July 2021 1	Desna Chernihiv	3–0	Chornomorets Odesa	Chernihiv
EEST (UTC+3)	Selin (yellow card) 35'; Kalitvintsev (yellow card) 50'; Kalitvintsev 52'; Kalitvintsev 56'; Zaviyskyi 80'	Report	Biloshevskyi (yellow card) 20' (yellow-red card) 39'; Avahimyan (yellow card) 37'; Vanat (yellow card) 78'	Stadium: Stadion Yuri Gagarin; Attendance: 3087; Referee: Oleksii Derevinskyi

1 August 2021 2	FC Mariupol	1–2	Desna Chernihiv	Mariupol
EEST (UTC+3)	Kashchuk (yellow card) 28' (yellow-red card) 35'; Kulakov 65'; Chobotenko (yellow card) 78'; Mykytyshyn (yellow card) 83'	Report	Kalitvintsev (yellow card) 49'; Safronov (yellow card) 64'; Selin (yellow card) 68'; Budkivskyi 71'; Bezborodko 90+2'	Stadium: Volodymyr Boiko Stadium; Attendance: 2400; Referee: Yaroslav Kozyk

9 August 2021 3	Desna Chernihiv	2–0	Inhulets Petrove	Chernihiv
EEST (UTC+3)	Dombrovskyi (yellow card) 30'; Arveladze (yellow card) 50'; Bezborodko 86'; Bezborodko 90+1'	Report	Salem (yellow card) 10'; Sitalo (yellow card) 57'	Stadium: Stadion Yuri Gagarin; Attendance: 3357; Referee: Roman Blavatskyi

14 August 2021 4	Desna Chernihiv	2–1	SC Dnipro-1	Chernihiv
EEST (UTC+3)	Bezborodko 30'; Zaviyskyi 86'	Report	Adamyuk (yellow card) 33'; Di Franco (yellow card) 40' (yellow-red card) 59'; Lohinov (yellow card) 43'; Pikhalyonok (yellow card) 75' (yellow-red card) 75'; Dovbyk 78'	Stadium: Stadion Yuri Gagarin; Attendance: 3587; Referee: Kateryna Monzul

22 August 2021 5	Dynamo Kyiv	4–0	Desna Chernihiv	Kyiv
EEST (UTC+3)	Buyalskyi 30'; Buyalskyi (yellow card) 37'; Tsyhankov 38'; Shaparenko (yellow card) 55'; Tsyhankov 56'; Zaviyskyi 79' (o.g.); Zabarnyi (yellow card) 84'; Tymchyk (yellow card) 90'	Report	Zaviyskyi (yellow card) 45+2'	Stadium: Lobanovsky Dynamo Stadium; Attendance: 8902; Referee: Paskhal Ihor

29 August 2021 6	Desna Chernihiv	0–4	Veres Rivne	Chernihiv
EEST (UTC+3)	Safronov (yellow card) 35'; Zaviyskyi (yellow card) 90+1'	Report	Nyemchaninov 4'; Serhiychuk 25'; Pasich (yellow card) 27'; Pasich 35'; Klyots 45+1'; Kucherov (yellow card) 69'; Ghecev (yellow card) 90+2'	Stadium: Stadion Yuri Gagarin; Attendance: 3180; Referee: Dmytro Panchyshyn

12 September 2021 7	Vorskla Poltava	2–2	Desna Chernihiv	Poltava
EEST (UTC+3)	Puclin 4'; Thill (yellow card) 16'; Stepanyuk 17'; Bondarenko (yellow card) 70'	Report	Selin (yellow card) 12'; Voloshyn 25'; Voloshyn (yellow card) 28'; Bezborodko 32'; Kartushov (yellow card) 41'; Zaviyskyi (yellow card) 64'; Tsymbalyuk (yellow card) 81'	Stadium: Butovsky Vorskla Stadium; Attendance: 5345; Referee: Serhiy Boyko

17 September 2021 8	Desna Chernihiv	1–0	Rukh Lviv	Chernihiv
EEST (UTC+3)	Zhuk (yellow card) 40'; Totovytskyi 90'; Mysak (yellow card) 90+2'	Report	Boryachuk (yellow card) 7'; Fedorchuk (yellow card) 26'; Prytula (yellow card) 53'; Karasyuk (yellow card) 88'; Sych (yellow card) 90'	Stadium: Stadion Yuri Gagarin; Attendance: 1117; Referee: Volodymyr Novohatnii

26 September 2021 9	Desna Chernihiv	1–2	Metalist 1925 Kharkiv	Chernihiv
EEST (UTC+3)	Totovytskyi 12'; Voloshyn (yellow card) 20'	Report	Marlyson 1'; Fabinho (yellow card) 19'; Kravchenko 49'; Kravchenko (yellow card) 52'; Habelok (yellow card) 55'	Stadium: Stadion Yuri Gagarin; Attendance: 1814; Referee: Oleksandr Omelchenko

3 October 2021 10	Zorya Luhansk	2–0	Desna Chernihiv	Zaporizhzhia
EEST (UTC+3)	Buletsa (penalty missed) 7'; Khomchenovskyi (yellow card) 12'; Buletsa 19'; Cvek (yellow card) 48'; Hromov 70'; Snurnitsyn (yellow card) 90+5'	Report	Lytovka (yellow card) 6'; Bolbat (yellow card) 37'; Budkivskyi (yellow card) 57'	Stadium: Slavutych-Arena; Attendance: 925; Referee: Andrii Kovalenko

17 October 2021 11	Mynai	0–0	Desna Chernihiv	Uzhhorod
EEST (UTC+3)	Matić (yellow card) 43'; Akhmedzade (yellow card) 56'; Khakhlyov (yellow card) 90+3'	Report	Dombrovskyi (yellow card) 75'; Bolbat (yellow card) 86'; Dehtyarov (yellow card) 89'; Kalitvintsev (yellow card) 90+3'	Stadium: Avanhard Stadium; Attendance: 1400; Referee: Dmytro Panchyshyn

23 October 2021 12	Desna Chernihiv	1–1	Oleksandriya	Chernihiv
EEST (UTC+3)	Bezborodko 35'; Budkivskyi (yellow card) 85'; Tsymbalyuk (yellow card) 90+1'	Report	Dryshlyuk (yellow card) 13'; Tretyakov 28'; Tsurikov (yellow card) 33'; Kalyuzhnyi (yellow card) 42'; Ustymenko (yellow card) 81'	Stadium: Stadion Yuri Gagarin; Attendance: 1644; Referee: Andrii Shandor

30 October 2021 13	Shakhtar Donetsk	4–1	Desna Chernihiv	Kyiv
EEST (UTC+3)	Solomon 8'; Sudakov 27'; Stepanenko (yellow card) 51'; Tetê 62'; Fernando 64'; Bondar (yellow card) 70'	Report	Bezborodko 23'	Stadium: NSC Olimpiyskiy; Attendance: 3184; Referee: Denys Shurman

7 November 2021 14	FC Lviv	0–2	Desna Chernihiv	Lviv
EEST (UTC+3)	Nych (yellow card) 21'; Zozulya (yellow card) 40'; Romanchuk (red card) 90+2'	Report	Kalitvintsev 52'; Zaviyskyi 82'	Stadium: Arena Lviv; Referee: Viktor Kopievskii

21 November 2021 15	Desna Chernihiv	0–1	Kolos Kovalivka	Chernihiv
EEST (UTC+3)	Bezborodko (yellow card) 54+1'; Selin (red card) 53'	Report	Zadoya (yellow card) 17'; Petrov (yellow card) 20'; Bohdanov (yellow card) 24'; Zolotov (yellow card) 28'; Sichinava 67'; Carioca (red card) 90+1'	Stadium: Stadion Yuri Gagarin; Attendance: 841; Referee: Maksym Kozyriatskyi

27 November 2021 16	Chornomorets Odesa	0–1	Desna Chernihiv	Odesa
EEST (UTC+3)	Vanat (yellow card) 40'; Vachiberadze (yellow card) 48'; Vantukh (yellow card) 59'; Dubko (yellow card) 86'; Isayenko (yellow card) 90+1'	Report	Totovytskyi 27'; Bolbat (yellow card) 32'	Stadium: Chornomorets Stadium; Attendance: 1374; Referee: Ihor Paskhal

5 December 2021 17	Desna Chernihiv	3–3	FC Mariupol	Chernihiv
EEST (UTC+3)	Kalitvintsev (yellow card) 45'; Dombrovskyi (yellow card) 45+1'; Arveladze 51'; Yurchenko 57'; Budkivskyi (penalty missed) 75 (p); Voloshyn 80'	Report	Myshnyov (yellow card) 16'; Kashchuk 24'; Chekh (yellow card) 37'; Kashchuk 49' (p); Khromey 90'	Stadium: Stadion Yuri Gagarin; Attendance: 631; Referee: Viktor Kopievskii

10 December 2021 18	Inhulets Petrove	2–1	Desna Chernihiv	Kropyvnytskyi
EEST (UTC+3)	Pospyelov 34'; Polehenko 47'; Kovalenko (yellow card) 62'; Opanasenko (yellow card) 77' (yellow-red card) 85'	Report	Dehtyarov 56'; Dehtyarov (yellow card) 69'; Selin (yellow card) 70'; Safronov (yellow card) 90+1'	Stadium: Zirka Stadium; Attendance: 421; Referee: Andrii Kovalenko

27 February 2022 19	SC Dnipro-1	Cancelled	Desna Chernihiv	Dnipro
EEST (UTC+3)		[Summary]		Stadium: Dnipro-Arena

5 March 2022 20	Desna Chernihiv	Cancelled	Dynamo Kyiv	Chernihiv
EEST (UTC+3)		[Summary]		Stadium: Stadion Yuri Gagarin

13 March 2022 21	Veres Rivne	Cancelled	Desna Chernihiv	Lutsk
EEST (UTC+3)		[Summary]		Stadium: Avanhard Stadium

19 March 2022 22	Desna Chernihiv	Cancelled	Vorskla Poltava	Chernihiv
EEST (UTC+3)		[Summary]		Stadium: Stadion Yuri Gagarin

2 April 2021 23	Rukh Lviv	Cancelled	Desna Chernihiv	Lviv
EEST (UTC+3)		[Summary]		Stadium: Ukraina Stadium

9 April 2022 24	Metalist 1925 Kharkiv	Cancelled	Desna Chernihiv	Kharkiv
EEST (UTC+3)		[Summary]		Stadium: Metalist OSC

16 April 2022 25	Desna Chernihiv	Cancelled	Zorya Luhansk	Chernihiv
EEST (UTC+3)		[Summary]		Stadium: Stadion Yuri Gagarin

23 April 2022 26	Desna Chernihiv	Cancelled	FC Mynai	Chernihiv
EEST (UTC+3)		[Summary]		Stadium: Stadion Yuri Gagarin

30 April 2022 27	FC Oleksandriya	Cancelled	Desna Chernihiv	Oleksandriya
EEST (UTC+3)		[Summary]		Stadium: CSC Nika Stadium

7 May 2021 28	Desna Chernihiv	Cancelled	Shakhtar Donetsk	Chernihiv
EEST (UTC+3)		[Summary]		Stadium: Stadion Yuri Gagarin

14 May 2022 29	Desna Chernihiv	Cancelled	FC Lviv	Chernihiv
EEST (UTC+3)		[Summary]		Stadium: Stadion Yuri Gagarin

21 May 2022 30	Kolos Kovalivka	Cancelled	Desna Chernihiv	Kolos Kovalivka
EEST (UTC+3)		[Summary]		Stadium: Kolos Stadium

=== Ukrainian Cup ===
21 September 2021 Round of 16	Metalist Kharkiv	2–1	Desna Chernihiv	Kharkiv
EEST (UTC+3)	Tankovskyi (yellow card) 51'; Demchenko (yellow card) 67'; Harris 73'; Porokh (yellow card) 81'; Myzyuk 88'	Report	Voloshyn 44'; Selin (yellow card) 49'; Budkivskyi (yellow card) 68'; Kalitvintsev (yellow card) 79'	Stadium: OSC Metalist; Attendance: 26,668; Referee: M.O. Balakin (Kyivska Oblast)

== Statistics ==
=== Appearances and goals ===
No.	Pos	Nat	Player	Total		Premier League		Cup		EL	
No.	Pos	Nat	Player	Apps	Goals	Apps	Goals	Apps	Goals	Apps	Goals
Goalkeepers
21	GK	(Ukraine) UKR	Roman Mysak	6	0	5	0	1	0	0	0
62	GK	(Ukraine) UKR	Illya Karavashchenko	0	0	0	0	0	0	0	0
72	GK	(Ukraine) UKR	Ihor Lytovka	13	0	13	0	0	0	0	0
Defenders
2	DF	(Ukraine) UKR	Vadym Zhuk	7	0	6	0	1	0	0	0
4	DF	(Ukraine) UKR	Yevhen Tsymbalyuk	15	0	15	0	0	0	0	0
5	DF	(Ukraine) UKR	Oleksandr Masalov	6	0	6	0	0	0	0	0
23	DF	(Ukraine) UKR	Danyil Pus	0	0	0	0	0	0	0	0
33	DF	(Ukraine) UKR	Yevhen Selin	16	0	15	0	1	0	0	0
	DF	(Belarus) BLR	Artem Khatskevich	0	0	0	0	0	0	0	0
Midfielders
7	MF	(Ukraine) UKR	Serhiy Makarenko	0	0	0	0	0	0	0	0
10	MF	(Ukraine) UKR	Dzhilindo Bezghubchenko	0	0	0	0	0	0	0	0
15	MF	(Ukraine) UKR	Vikentiy Voloshyn	12	3	11	2	1	1	0	0
16	MF	(Ukraine) UKR	Yevheniy Belych	1	0	1	0	0	0	0	0
17	MF	(Ukraine) UKR	Taras Zaviyskyi	18	3	17	3	1	0	0	0
28	MF	(Greece) GRE	Giorgios Ermidis	0	0	0	0	0	0	0	0
80	MF	(Ukraine) UKR	Bohdan Sheiko	0	0	0	0	0	0	0	0
Forwards
11	FW	(Ukraine) UKR	Oleksiy Pashchenko	0	0	0	0	0	0	0	0
19	FW	(Ukraine) UKR	Denys Demyanenko	0	0	0	0	0	0	0	0
90	FW	(Ukraine) UKR	Illya Shevtsov	12	0	12	0	0	0	0	0
Players transferred out during the season
6	DF	(Ukraine) UKR	Kristian Bilovar	1	0	1	0	0	0	0	0
7	MF	(Ukraine) UKR	Oleksiy Hutsulyak	2	0	2	0	0	0	0	0
89	MF	(Ukraine) UKR	Renat Mochulyak	0	0	0	0	0	0	0	0
91	MF	(Ukraine) UKR	Pavlo Shostka	0	0	0	0	0	0	0	0
10	MF	(Ukraine) UKR	Andriy Totovytskyi	14	3	13	3	1	0	0	0
28	FW	(Ukraine) UKR	Pylyp Budkivskyi	19	1	18	1	1	0	0	0
6	DF	(Ukraine) UKR	Oleksiy Kovtun	5	0	4	0	1	0	0	0
7	MF	(Ukraine) UKR	Serhiy Bolbat	14	0	13	0	1	0	0	0
80	MF	(Ukraine) UKR	Vladlen Yurchenko	7	1	7	1	0	0	0	0
11	MF	(Ukraine) UKR	Vladyslav Kalitvintsev	17	3	16	3	1	0	0	0
12	MF	(Ukraine) UKR	Yehor Kartushov	16	0	15	0	1	0	0	0
77	MF	(Ukraine) UKR	Maksym Dehtyarov	12	1	11	1	1	0	0	0
20	FW	(Ukraine) UKR	Denys Bezborodko	19	7	18	7	1	0	0	0
1	GK	(Ukraine) UKR	Dmytro Sydorenko	0	0	0	0	0	0	0	0
3	DF	(Ukraine) UKR	Oleksandr Safronov	16	0	16	0	0	0	0	0
8	MF	(Ukraine) UKR	Andriy Dombrovskyi	17	0	16	0	1	0	0	0
9	MF	(Ukraine) UKR	Levan Arveladze	16	1	15	1	1	0	0	0

Source: Competitions

Last updated: 7 April 2022

=== Goalscorers ===
Rank	No.	Pos	Nat	Name	Premier League	Cup	Europa League	Total
1	20	FW	(Ukraine)	Denys Bezborodko	7	0	0	7
2	11	MF	(Ukraine)	Vladyslav Kalitvintsev	3	0	0	3
2	17	MF	(Ukraine)	Taras Zaviyskyi	3	0	0	3
2	10	MF	(Ukraine)	Andriy Totovytskyi	3	0	0	3
2	15	MF	(Ukraine)	Vikentiy Voloshyn	2	1	0	3
4	9	MF	(Georgia (country))	Levan Arveladze	1	0	0	1
4	28	FW	(Ukraine)	Pylyp Budkivskyi	1	0	0	1
4	80	MF	(Ukraine)	Vladlen Yurchenko	1	0	0	1
4	77	FW	(Ukraine)	Maksym Dehtyarov	1	0	0	1
				Total	22	1	0	23

Last updated: 10 December 2021

=== Clean sheets ===
Rank	No.	Pos	Nat	Name	Premier League	Cup	Europa League	Total
1	72	GK	(Ukraine)	Ihor Lytovka	4	0	0	4
2	21	GK	(Ukraine)	Roman Mysak	2	0	0	2
				Total	6	0	0	6

Last updated: 27 November 2021

=== Disciplinary record ===
No.	Pos	Nat	Player	Premier League			Cup			Europa League			Total		
No.	Pos	Nat	Player	Yellow card	(yellow card) (yellow-red card)	Red card	Yellow card	(yellow card) (yellow-red card)	Red card	Yellow card	(yellow card) (yellow-red card)	Red card	Yellow card	(yellow card) (yellow-red card)	Red card
33	MF	(Ukraine)	Yevhen Selin	5	0	1	1	0	0	0	0	0	6	0	1
11	MF	(Ukraine)	Vladyslav Kalitvintsev	4	0	0	1	0	0	0	0	0	5	0	0
4	DF	(Ukraine)	Yevhen Tsymbalyuk	4	0	0	0	0	0	0	0	0	4	0	0
17	MF	(Ukraine)	Taras Zaviyskyi	3	0	0	0	0	0	0	0	0	3	0	0
7	MF	(Ukraine)	Serhiy Bolbat	3	0	0	0	0	0	0	0	0	3	0	0
8	MF	(Ukraine)	Andriy Dombrovskyi	3	0	0	0	0	0	0	0	0	3	0	0
3	DF	(Ukraine)	Oleksandr Safronov	3	0	0	0	0	0	0	0	0	3	0	0
15	MF	(Ukraine)	Vikentiy Voloshyn	2	0	0	0	0	0	0	0	0	2	0	0
28	FW	(Ukraine)	Pylyp Budkivskyi	2	0	0	1	0	0	0	0	0	3	0	0
77	FW	(Ukraine)	Maksym Dehtyarov	2	0	0	0	0	0	0	0	0	2	0	0
9	MF	(Georgia (country))	Levan Arveladze	1	0	0	0	0	0	0	0	0	1	0	0
12	MF	(Ukraine)	Yehor Kartushov	1	0	0	0	0	0	0	0	0	1	0	0
15	DF	(Ukraine)	Vadym Zhuk	1	0	0	0	0	0	0	0	0	1	0	0
15	GK	(Ukraine)	Roman Mysak	1	0	0	0	0	0	0	0	0	1	0	0
72	GK	(Ukraine)	Ihor Lytovka	1	0	0	0	0	0	0	0	0	1	0	0
20	FW	(Ukraine)	Denys Bezborodko	1	0	0	0	0	0	0	0	0	1	0	0
			Total	37	0	0	3	0	0	0	0	0	40	0	1

Last updated: 10 December 2021
