= Oleksandr Tomakh (footballer, born 1948) =

Soviet footballer and Ukrainian coach

Aleksandr Tomakh
Personal information
- Full name: Oleksandr Oleksandrovych Tomakh
- Date of birth: 17 October 1948 (age 78)
- Place of birth: Minsk, Belarusian SSR
- Positions: Midfielder; right back

Senior career*
Years	Team	Apps	(Gls)
1967–1968	FC Bukovyna Chernivtsi		
1968–1975	FC Metalurh Zaporizhzhia		
1976–1978	FC Dnipro Dnipropetrovsk		
1978–1980	FC Metalurh Zaporizhzhia		

Managerial career
- 1981–1988: FC Metalurh Zaporizhzhia
- 1988–1990: FC Nyva Vinnytsia
- 1990–1994: FC Viktor Zaporizhzhia
- 1994–1998: FC Metalurh Zaporizhzhia
- 1994–2002: FC Metalurh Zaporizhzhia (vice-president)
- 2003–2004: FC Systema-Boreks Borodianka
- 2004: FC Polissya Zhytomyr
- 2004–2007: FC Desna Chernihiv
- 2007–2009: FC Arsenal Kyiv (sportive director)
- 2009–2010: FC Skala Morshyn
- 2012: FC Arsenal Kyiv (sportive director)
- 2013–2015: FC Metalurh Zaporizhzhia (sportive director)
- 2014–2015: FC Metalurh Zaporizhzhia (interim coach)
- * Club domestic league appearances and goals

Oleksandr Oleksandrovych Tomakh (Ukrainian: Олександр Олександрович Томах; born 17 October 1948 in Minsk, Belarusian SSR) is a retired Soviet football player and a Ukrainian coach.

== After Retirement ==
In 2004, the president of Desna Chernihiv, Ivan Chaus appointed as coach of the club of the city of Chernihiv. He managed to win the Ukrainian Second League in the season 2005–06 and having in his team Andriy Yarmolenko and Oleksandr Kozhemyachenko top scorer of the Ukrainian Second League in the season 2004–05.

== Honours ==
Desna Chernihiv

- Ukrainian Second League: 2005–06

=== Individual ===
- Ukrainian Second League Best Coach: 2005–06

== See also ==
- Oleksandr Tomakh (footballer born 1993)
- History of FC Desna Chernihiv
