= Yevheniy Belych =

Ukrainian footballer (born 2001)

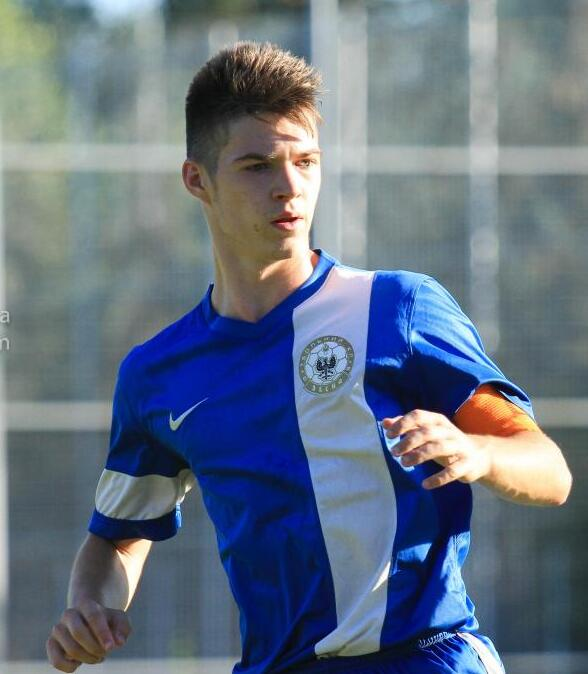
- Belych in 2018

Personal information
- Full name: Yevheniy Stanislavovych Belych
- Date of birth: 9 January 2001 (age 25)
- Place of birth: Chernihiv, Ukraine
- Height: 1.74 m (5 ft 9 in)
- Position: Midfielder

Team information
- Current team: KSZO Ostrowiec
- Number: 17

Youth career
- 2013–2018: SDYuShOR Desna
- 2018: Desna-3 Chernihiv
- 2018–2019: Desna-2 Chernihiv

Senior career*
Years	Team	Apps	(Gls)
2019–2022	Desna Chernihiv	2	(0)
2021	→ Dinaz Vyshhorod (loan)	9	(0)
2022	→ Piast Nowa Ruda (loan)	12	(5)
2022–2023	Orzeł Ząbkowice Śląskie	26	(6)
2023–2024	Odra Bytom Odrzański	32	(9)
2024–2025	Hutnik Kraków	32	(3)
2025–	KSZO Ostrowiec	41	(14)

International career
2016–2017	Ukraine U16	4	(0)
- * Club domestic league appearances and goals as of 16 November 2026

Yevheniy Stanislavovych Belych (Ukrainian: Євгеній Станіславович Белич; born 9 January 2001) is a Ukrainian professional footballer who plays as a midfielder for Polish club KSZO Ostrowiec Świętokrzyski.

== Club career ==
Belych is a product of the Desna Chernihiv youth system.

=== Desna Chernihiv ===
He made his Ukrainian Premier League debut for Desna Chernihiv on 25 May 2019 in a game against FC Arsenal Kyiv. In June, he signed a professional contract extension with Desna, extending it at the end of the season.

=== Loan to Dinaz Vyshhorod ===
On 19 February 2021 he moved on loan to Dinaz Vyshhorod in the Ukrainian Second League. On 19 March, he made his debut with the new team against Chaika.

=== Return to Desna Chernihiv ===
On 25 July 2021, he made his return to the first team in the Ukrainian Premier League against Chornomorets Odesa, replacing Andriy Totovytskyi in the 87th minute.

=== Piast Nowa Ruda ===
On 18 March 2022, he moved to Piast Nowa Ruda in Poland.

=== Hutnik Kraków ===
In summer 2024, Belych signed a contract with Hutnik Kraków in II liga. On 25 June 2025, Hutnik announced he would leave the club at the end of the month.

=== KSZO Ostrowiec Świętokrzyski ===
On 26 June 2025, Belych signed for III liga club KSZO Ostrowiec Świętokrzyski.

== International career ==
Between 2016 and 2017, Belych appeared four times for the Ukraine under-16 side, becoming the first Desna player to do so.

== Career statistics ==
As of match played 14 November 2026

Appearances and goals by club, season and competition
Club	Season	League			National cup (Note: Includes Polish Cup)		Europe		Other		Total	
Club	Season	Division	Apps	Goals	Apps	Goals	Apps	Goals	Apps	Goals	Apps	Goals
Desna Chernihiv	2019–20	Ukrainian Premier League	1	0	0	0	0	0	0	0	1	0
Desna Chernihiv	2021–22	Ukrainian Premier League	1	0	0	0	0	0	0	0	1	0
Desna Chernihiv	Total		2	0	0	0	0	0	0	0	2	0
Dinaz Vyshhorod (loan)	2020–21	Ukrainian Second League	9	0	0	0	0	0	0	0	9	0
Piast Nowa Ruda (loan)	2021–22	IV liga Lower Silesia	12	5	—		—		—		12	5
Orzeł Ząbkowice Śląskie	2022–23	IV liga Lower Silesia	26	6	—		—		—		26	6
Odra Bytom Odrzański	2023–24	III liga, group III	32	9	—		—		—		32	9
Hutnik Kraków	2024–25	II liga	32	3	1	2	—		—		33	5
KSZO Ostrowiec	2025–26	III liga, group IV	29	13	—		—		3 (Note: Appearances in II liga relegation play-offs)	0	32	13
KSZO Ostrowiec	2026–27	III liga, group IV	12	1	—		—		—		12	1
KSZO Ostrowiec	Total		41	14	—		—		3	0	44	14
Career total			154	37	1	2	0	0	3	0	158	39
