= Dmytro Sydorenko =

Ukrainian footballer (born 2002)

Personal information
- Full name: Dmytro Vyacheslavovich Sydorenko
- Date of birth: 12 November 2002 (age 24)
- Place of birth: Chernihiv, Ukraine
- Height: 1.87 m (6 ft 2 in)
- Position: Goalkeeper

Team information
- Current team: Miedź Legnica
- Number: 12

Youth career
- 2015–2018: SDYuShOR Desna
- 2018–2020: Desna-3 Chernihiv
- 2020–2021: Desna-2 Chernihiv

Senior career*
| Years | Team | Apps | (Gls) |
| 2021–2022 | Desna Chernihiv | 0 | (0) |
| 2022 | Izolator Boguchwała | 18 | (0) |
| 2022–2025 | Pogoń Grodzisk Maz. | 51 | (0) |
| 2025– | Miedź Legnica | 9 | (0) |
| 2025 | → Pogoń Grodzisk Maz. (loan) | 13 | (0) |
| 2025 | Miedź Legnica II | 4 | (0) |
| 2026 | → Rekord Bielsko-Biała (loan) | 1 | (0) |
- * Club domestic league appearances and goals as of 7 November 2026

Dmytro Vyacheslavovich Sydorenko (Ukrainian: Дмитро Вячеславович Сидоренко; born 1 November 2002) is a Ukrainian professional footballer who plays as a goalkeeper for I liga club Miedź Legnica.

== Career ==
=== Desna Chernihiv ===
Sydorenko is a product of the Desna Chernihiv youth system, playing for Desna-3 Chernihiv and Desna-2 Chernihiv. Due to the full-scale Russian invasion of Ukraine, he left the club.

=== Izolator Boguchwała ===
In March 2022, Sydorenko signed with Izolator Boguchwała in IV liga. On 26 March, he made his debut against Karpaty Krosno. In the summer, he left the club.

=== Pogoń Grodzisk Mazowiecki ===
In July 2022, Sydorenko moved to Pogoń Grodzisk Mazowiecki in III liga. He made his II liga debut on 20 July 2023 in a 2–0 victory over Polonia Bytom.

=== Miedź Legnica ===
On 21 January 2025, Sydorenko signed a three-and-a-half-year contract with I liga club Miedź Legnica. He was then loaned back to Pogoń until the end of the season. He made his contribution to get the club promoted to I liga.

On 2 August 2025, Sydorenko made his debut for Miedź in a 4–0 league loss against Pogoń Grodzisk Mazowiecki. On 24 September 2025, he made his first Polish Cup appearance for Miedź in a 2–0 win over Pogoń Siedlce.

==== Loan to Rekord Bielsko-Biała ====
On 26 February 2026, he was loaned to Rekord Bielsko-Biała in II liga.

== Career statistics ==
As of match played 7 November 2026

Appearances and goals by club, season and competition
| Club | Season | League | | | National cup (Note: Includes Polish Cup) | | Other | | Total | |
| Club | Season | Division | Apps | Goals | Apps | Goals | Apps | Goals | Apps | Goals |
|---|---|---|---|---|---|---|---|---|---|---|
| Desna Chernihiv | 2021–22 | Ukrainian Premier League | 0 | 0 | 0 | 0 | 0 | 0 | 0 | 0 |
| Izolator Boguchwała | 2021–22 | IV liga Subcarpathia | 18 | 0 | — | | — | | 18 | 0 |
| Pogoń Grodzisk Maz. | 2022–23 | III liga, group I | 10 | 0 | 0 | 0 | — | | 10 | 0 |
| Pogoń Grodzisk Maz. | 2023–24 | III liga, group I | 22 | 0 | — | | — | | 22 | 0 |
| Pogoń Grodzisk Maz. | 2024–25 | II liga | 32 | 0 | 2 | 0 | — | | 34 | 0 |
| Pogoń Grodzisk Maz. | Total | | 64 | 0 | 2 | 0 | — | | 66 | 0 |
| Miedź Legnica | 2025–26 | I liga | 1 | 0 | 2 | 0 | — | | 3 | 0 |
| Miedź Legnica | 2026–27 | I liga | 8 | 0 | 1 | 0 | — | | 9 | 0 |
| Miedź Legnica | Total | | 9 | 0 | 3 | 0 | — | | 12 | 0 |
| Miedź Legnica II | 2025–26 | III liga, group III | 4 | 0 | 0 | 0 | — | | 4 | 0 |
| Rekord Bielsko-Biała (loan) | 2025–26 | II liga | 1 | 0 | — | | — | | 1 | 0 |
| Career total | | | 96 | 0 | 5 | 0 | 0 | 0 | 101 | 0 |

== Honours ==
Pogoń Grodzisk Mazowiecki

- II liga runner-up: 2024–25
- III liga, group I: 2023–24
- Polish Cup (Masovia regionals): 2023–24
