= Andriy Dombrovskyi =

Ukrainian footballer

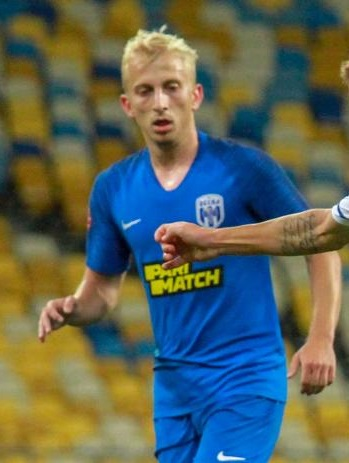

Personal information
- Full name: Andriy Anatoliyovych Dombrovskyi
- Date of birth: 12 August 1995 (age 31)
- Place of birth: Kyiv, Ukraine
- Height: 1.76 m (5 ft 9 1/2 in)
- Position: Midfielder

Youth career
- 2009–2010: FC Hart-Ros Irpin
- 2011: Obolon-Zmina Kyiv
- 2011–2012: FC Zirka Kyiv

Senior career*
Years	Team	Apps	(Gls)
2012–2014	Illichivets Mariupol	0	(0)
2014–2019	Arsenal Kyiv	106	(3)
2019–2022	Desna Chernihiv	53	(0)
2022	→ Bruk-Bet Termalica (loan)	8	(0)
2022–2025	Bruk-Bet Termalica	77	(2)
- * Club domestic league appearances and goals as of 09:29, 29 May 2025 (UTC)

Andriy Dombrovskyi (Ukrainian: Андрій Анатолійович Домбровський; born 22 August 1995) is a Ukrainian professional footballer who plays as a midfielder.

== Career ==
Dombrovskyi is a product of the FC Hart-Ros Irpen and two Kyivan Youth Sportive Schools: Obolon-Zmina and Zirka. His first trainer was Oleksandr Kaploushenko. He spent his career as a player for Illichivets Mariupol in the Ukrainian Premier League Reserves and afterwards for Arsenal Kyiv.

=== Desna Chernihiv ===
On 25 July 2019, he moved to Desna Chernihiv. On 24 August 2019, he made his debut against Oleksandriya, replacing Andriy Bohdanov in the 80th minute. Desna Chernihiv finished 4th in the 2019-20 Ukrainian Premier League season and qualified for the 2020–21 Europa League third qualifying round for the first time in club history.

On 12 September 2021, he was elected Man of the Match for a league victory over Vorskla Poltava.

==== Loan to Bruk-Bet Termalica ====
On 25 March 2022, he moved on loan to Polish Ekstraklasa side Bruk-Bet Termalica Nieciecza. He made his debut on 4 April in a 1–1 draw against Radomiak Radom at the Stadion Sportowy Bruk-Bet Termalica.

=== Bruk-Bet Termalica ===
On 13 June 2022, despite Bruk-Bet Termalica's relegation to I liga, he joined the team permanently on a three-year deal.

He was released by the club upon the expiration of his contract on 30 June 2025.

== Outside of professional football ==
In March 2022, during the Siege of Chernihiv, Andriy Dombrovskyi, together with other former Desna Chernihiv players, raised money for the civilian population of the city of Chernihiv.

== Career statistics ==
As of match played 7 December 2024

Appearances and goals by club, season and competition
Club	Season	League			National cup (Note: Includes Ukrainian Cup, Polish Cup)		Europe		Other		Total	
Club	Season	Division	Apps	Goals	Apps	Goals	Apps	Goals	Apps	Goals	Apps	Goals
Arsenal Kyiv	2014–15	Ukrainian Second League	0	0	2	0	—		0	0	2	0
Arsenal Kyiv	2015–16	Ukrainian Second League	22	2	1	0	—		0	0	23	2
Arsenal Kyiv	2016–17	Ukrainian First League	26	1	2	0	—		0	0	28	1
Arsenal Kyiv	2017–18	Ukrainian First League	29	0	3	0	—		0	0	32	0
Arsenal Kyiv	2018–19	Ukrainian Premier League	29	0	0	0	—		0	0	29	0
Arsenal Kyiv	Total		106	3	8	0	—		0	0	114	3
Desna Chernihiv	2019–20	Ukrainian Premier League	17	0	1	0	—		0	0	18	0
Desna Chernihiv	2020–21	Ukrainian Premier League	20	0	2	0	1 (Note: Appearance in UEFA Europa League)	0	0	0	23	0
Desna Chernihiv	2021–22	Ukrainian Premier League	16	0	1	0	—		0	0	17	0
Desna Chernihiv	Total		53	0	4	0	1	0	0	0	58	0
Bruk-Bet Termalica (loan)	2021–22	Ekstraklasa	8	0	—		—		—		8	0
Bruk-Bet Termalica	2022–23	I liga	29	1	0	0	—		—		29	1
Bruk-Bet Termalica	2023–24	I liga	29	1	0	0	—		—		29	1
Bruk-Bet Termalica	2024–25	I liga	19	0	1	0	—		—		20	0
Bruk-Bet Termalica	Total		85	2	0	0	—		—		86	2
Career total			244	5	13	0	1	0	0	0	258	5

== Honours ==
Arsenal Kyiv

- Ukrainian First League: 2017–18
- Ukrainian Second League: 2015–16

Illichivets Mariupol

- Ukrainian Premier League Reserves: 2013–14
