= Fabinho (footballer, born 1996) =

Brazilian footballer

Personal information
- Full name: Fábio Alexander Freitas de Almeida
- Date of birth: 7 July 1996 (age 30)
- Place of birth: Rio de Janeiro, Brazil
- Height: 1.86 m (6 ft 1 in)
- Position: Central midfielder

Team information
- Current team: Primavera

Youth career
- –2015: Sacavenense
- 2015: Torreense

Senior career*
Years	Team	Apps	(Gls)
2015–2016	Pinhalnovense	0	(0)
2016–2017	Oriental Dragon		
2017–2018	Vasco da Gama	0	(0)
2018–2019	Teresópolis	5	(2)
2019	Metalist 1925 Kharkiv	2	(0)
2019–2020	Olimpik Donetsk	13	(0)
2020–2021	Ventspils	11	(0)
2021–2022	Metalist 1925 Kharkiv	15	(0)
2022	→ Ponte Preta (loan)	1	(0)
2023–	Primavera	0	(0)
- * Club domestic league appearances and goals as of 18 January 2023

Fábio Alexander Freitas de Almeida (born 7 July 1996), known as Fabinho, is a Brazilian professional footballer who plays as a central midfielder for Primavera.

== Club career ==
In July 2021, Fabinho switched to Ukrainian club Metalist 1925 Kharkiv.
