= Vladyslav Kalitvintsev =

Ukrainian footballer

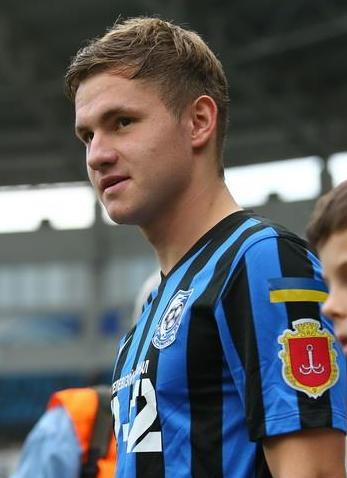
- Kalitvintsev with Chornomorets Odesa in 2015

Personal information
- Full name: Vladyslav Yuriyovych Kalitvintsev
- Date of birth: 4 January 1993 (age 33)
- Place of birth: Moscow, Russia
- Height: 1.78 m (5 ft 10 in)
- Position: Midfielder

Team information
- Current team: Metalist 1925 Kharkiv
- Number: 45

Youth career
- 2001–2003: Yevrobis Kyiv
- 2003–2009: Dynamo Kyiv

Senior career*
Years	Team	Apps	(Gls)
2009–2018	Dynamo Kyiv	14	(2)
2009	→ Dynamo-2 Kyiv	13	(2)
2013	→ Slovan Liberec (loan)	13	(0)
2015–2016	→ Chornomorets Odesa (loan)	32	(5)
2017	→ Zorya Luhansk (loan)	15	(2)
2019	Arsenal Kyiv	11	(1)
2019–2021	Desna Chernihiv	63	(10)
2022–2024	Oleksandriya	44	(3)
2024–	Metalist 1925 Kharkiv	39	(1)

International career^{‡}
2008–2009	Ukraine U16	14	(4)
2009–2010	Ukraine U17	11	(0)
2009–2011	Ukraine U18	4	(0)
2010–2012	Ukraine U19	7	(1)
2012	Ukraine U20	1	(0)
2013–2014	Ukraine U21	21	
- * Club domestic league appearances and goals as of 3 June 2026 ‡ National team caps and goals as of 24 January 2019

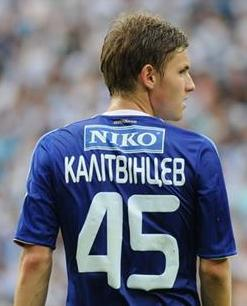
Kalitvintsev in 2013

Vladyslav Yuriyovych Kalitvintsev (Ukrainian: Владислав Юрійович Калітвінцев; born 4 January 1993) is a professional footballer who plays as a midfielder for Metalist 1925 Kharkiv. Born in Russia, he has represented Ukraine at youth level.

There are instances of his last name (surname) being spelled as Kalytvyntsev due to transliteration issues.

== Career ==
=== Dynamo Kyiv ===
He made his debut for Dynamo Kyiv against FC Metalurh Zaporizhya on 9 May 2010. Being only 17 years and 4 months old at his first appearance, he is the youngest player ever to play for Dynamo Kyiv in the Ukrainian Premier League. In the 2014–15 and 2015–16 seasons, he won the Ukrainian Premier League with Kyiv. He also won the Ukrainian Cup in both seasons.

=== Arsenal Kyiv ===
In March 2019, he moved to Arsenal Kyiv, where he played 11 matches and scored one goal against Vorskla Poltava.

=== Desna Chernihiv ===
In 2019, he signed with Desna Chernihiv. On 15 September, he scored against his former club. He was named Best Player of the Round 7. As a result of the club's 4th-place finish in 2019–20, they qualified for the 2020–21 Europa League for the first time in club history.

On 24 September 2020, Kalitvintsev played against VfL Wolfsburg in the Europa League. On 16 February 2021 he extended his contract with Desna Chernihiv until 2023. On 1 May he scored against Kolos Kovalivka.

On 25 July 2021, he scored two goals in a 3–0 victory over Chornomorets Odesa.

On 28 December, Kalitvintsev terminated his contract with Desna Chernihiv, claiming non-payment of his salary.

=== Oleksandriya ===
In January 2022, he moved to Oleksandriya in the Ukrainian Premier League for €500,000.

=== Metalist 1925 Kharkiv ===
On 21 August 2024, Kalitvintsev joined Metalist 1925 Kharkiv in the Ukrainian First League on a two-season contract.

== International career ==
He was part of the Ukraine under-21 side that reached the final of the 2013 Commonwealth of Independent States Cup. He was also part of the side that won the competition the following year. In September 2021, he was called up to the senior side for a friendly against Finland, becoming the first player belonging to Desna Chernihiv to be called in the Ukraine national football team, but did not make a debut at the pitch.

== Personal life ==
Kalitvintsev is the son of Yuriy Kalitvintsev, a former Ukrainian international and assistant manager.

== Outside of professional football ==
In March 2022, during the Siege of Chernihiv, Kalitvintsev, together with other former Desna players, raised and donated money to the civilian population of the city.

== Career statistics ==
=== Club ===
As of match played 3 May 2026

Appearances and goals by club, season and competition
Club	Season	League			Cup		Europe		Other		Total	
Club	Season	Division	Apps	Goals	Apps	Goals	Apps	Goals	Apps	Goals	Apps	Goals
Dynamo-2 Kyiv	2009–10	Ukrainian First League	9	3	0	0	0	0	0	0	9	3
Total			9	3	0	0	0	0	0	0	9	3
Dynamo Kyiv	2009–10	Ukrainian Premier League	1	0	0	0	0	0	0	0	1	0
Dynamo Kyiv	2010–11	Ukrainian Premier League	1	0	0	0	0	0	0	0	1	0
Dynamo Kyiv	2011–12	Ukrainian Premier League	1	0	0	0	0	0	0	0	1	0
Dynamo Kyiv	2012–13	Ukrainian Premier League	1	0	0	0	0	0	0	0	1	0
Dynamo Kyiv	2013–14	Ukrainian Premier League	3	0	0	0	0	0	0	0	3	0
Dynamo Kyiv	2014–15	Ukrainian Premier League	6	1	3	1	5	0	0	0	14	2
Dynamo Kyiv	2018–19	Ukrainian Premier League	1	0	0	0	0	0	0	0	1	0
Dynamo Kyiv	Total		14	1	3	1	5	0	0	0	22	2
Slovan Liberec (loan)	2013–14	Czech First League	13	0	1	1	11 (Note: eleven appearances in 2013–14 UEFA Europa League)	1	0	0	25	2
Chornomorets Odesa (loan)	2015–16	Ukrainian Premier League	20	5	2	0	0	0	0	0	22	5
Chornomorets Odesa (loan)	2016–17	Ukrainian Premier League	12	0	0	0	0	0	0	0	12	0
Zorya Luhansk (loan)	2016–17	Ukrainian Premier League	6	1	0	0	0	0	0	0	6	1
Zorya Luhansk (loan)	2017–18	Ukrainian Premier League	9	1	0	0	0	0	0	0	9	1
Arsenal Kyiv	2018–19	Ukrainian Premier League	11	1	0	0	0	0	0	0	11	1
Desna Chernihiv	2019–20	Ukrainian Premier League	26	6	2	0	0	0	0	0	28	6
Desna Chernihiv	2020–21	Ukrainian Premier League	21	1	2	0	1 (Note: one appearance in Europa League third qualifying round)	0	0	0	24	1
Desna Chernihiv	2021–22	Ukrainian Premier League	16	3	1	0	0	0	0	0	17	3
Desna Chernihiv	Total		63	10	5	0	1	0	0	0	69	10
Oleksandriya	2021–22	Ukrainian Premier League	0	0	0	0	0	0	0	0	0	0
Oleksandriya	2022–23	Ukrainian Premier League	20	2	0	0	0	0	0	0	22	2
Oleksandriya	2023-23	Ukrainian Premier League	24	1	2	0	0	0	0	0	26	1
Oleksandriya	Total		44	3	2	0	0	0	0	0	48	3
Metalist 1925 Kharkiv	2024-25	Ukrainian First League	15	0	1	0	0	0	2	1	18	1
Metalist 1925 Kharkiv	2025-26	Ukrainian Premier League	21	1	4	0	0	0	0	0	25	1
Total			36	1	5	0	0	0	2	1	43	2
Career total			237	26	18	2	17	1	2	1	274	30

== Honours ==
Dynamo Kyiv

- Ukrainian Premier League: (2) 2014–15 2015–16
- Ukrainian Cup: (2) 2013–14, 2014–15
- Ukrainian Super Cup runners-up: 2013

Ukraine national under-21
Winner (1): Commonwealth of Independent States Cup: 2014
Runner Up (1): Commonwealth of Independent States Cup: 2013

Individual

- Best Player of November 2021 of Desna Chernihiv

== Gallery ==
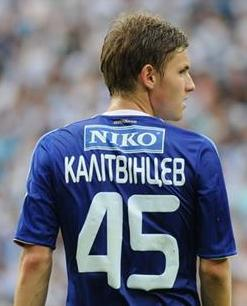
Kalytvyntsev in 2013 with Slovan Liberec

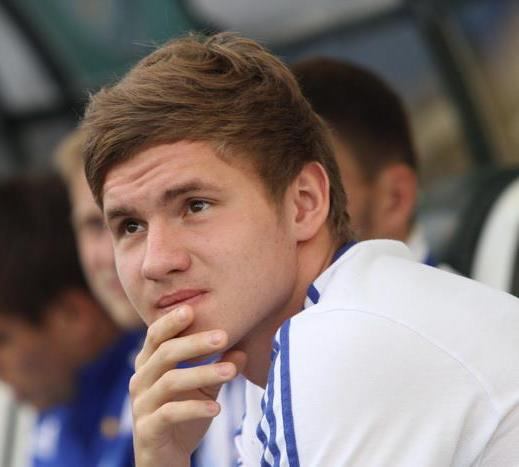
Kalytvyntsev in 2014 with Arsenal Kyiv

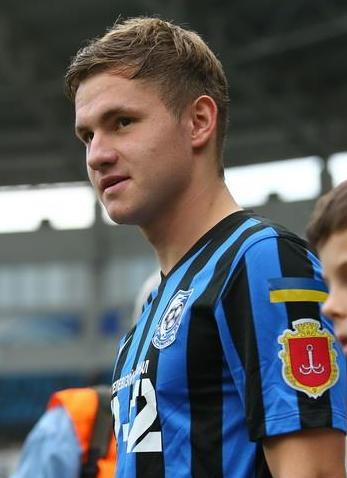
Kalytvyntsev in 2015 with Chornomorets Odesa

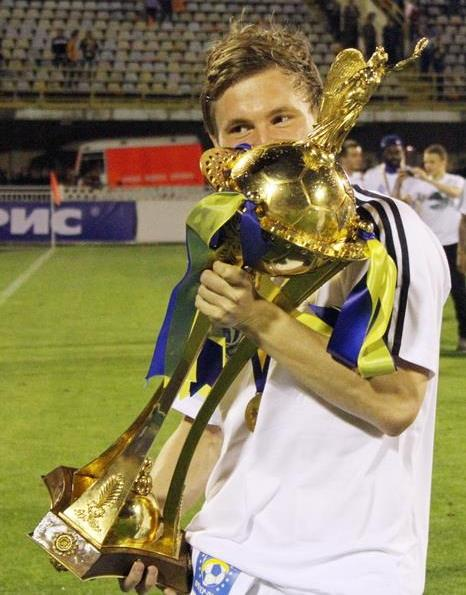
Kalytvyntsev with the Ukrainian Cup in the season 2013–14

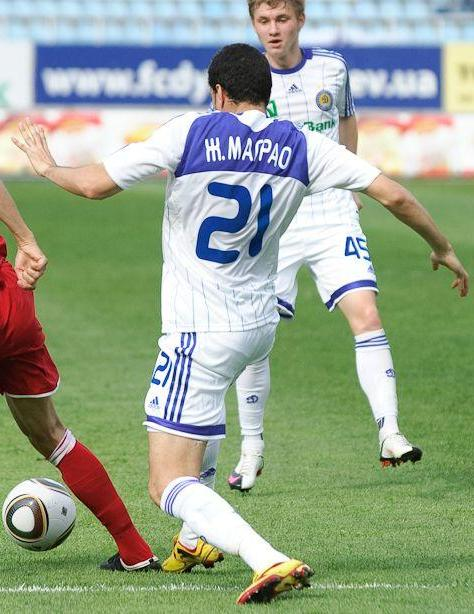
Gérson Magrão & Kalytvyntsev

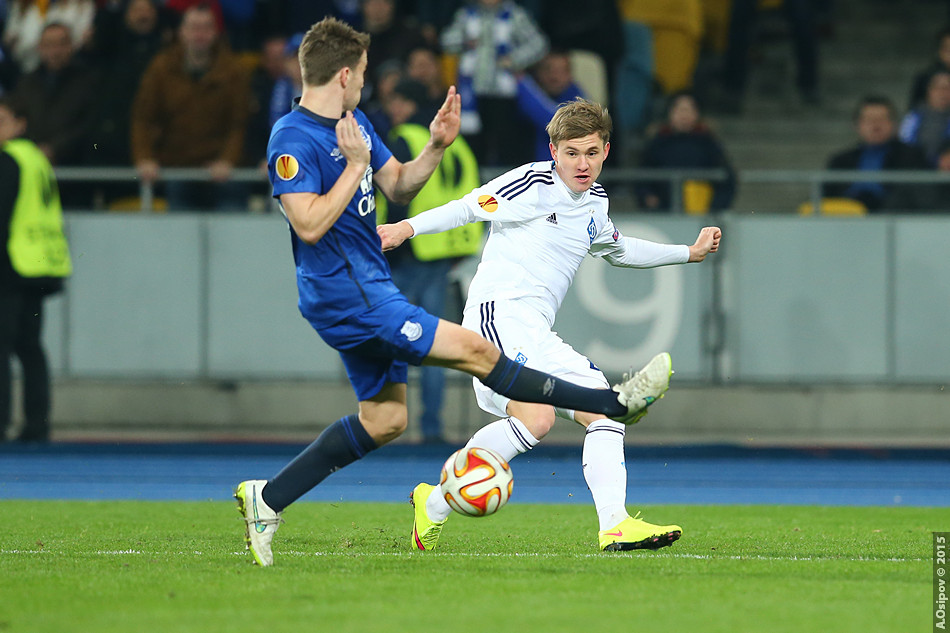
Vladyslav Kalitvintsev with Dynamo Kyiv

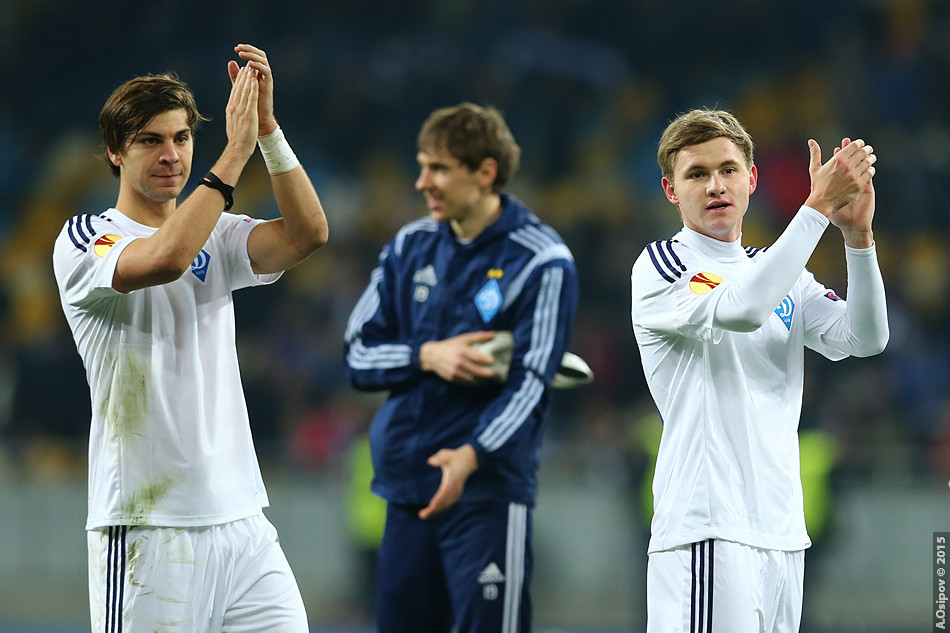
Kalytvyntsev & Aleksandar Dragović with Dynamo Kyiv

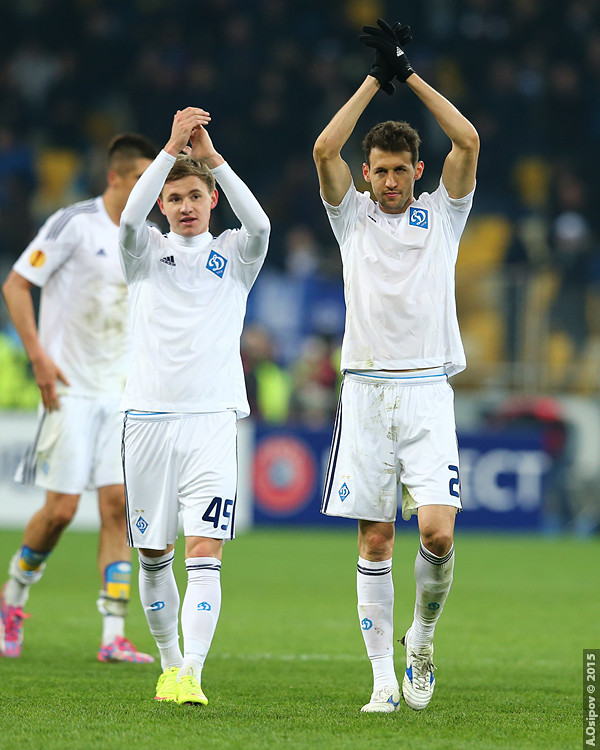
Kalytvyntsev with Danilo da Silva with Dynamo Kyiv
