= Taras Zaviyskyi =

Ukrainian footballer

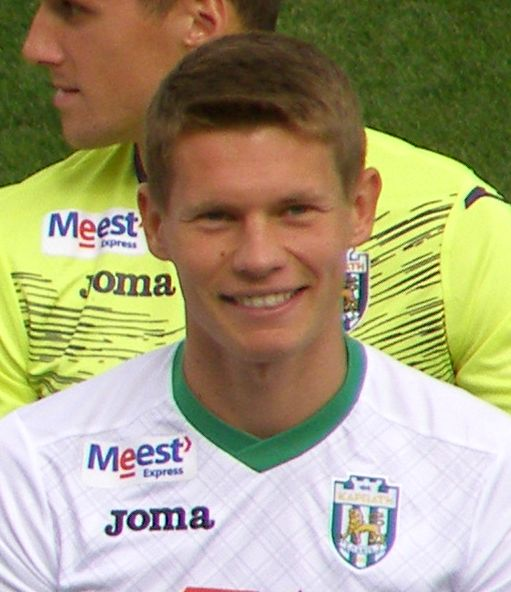

Personal information
- Full name: Taras Mykhaylovych Zaviyskyi
- Date of birth: 12 April 1995 (age 31)
- Place of birth: Lviv, Ukraine
- Height: 1.79 m (5 ft 10 in)
- Positions: Right-back; midfielder

Team information
- Current team: Slávia TU Košice
- Number: 25

Youth career
- 2005–2012: Karpaty Lviv

Senior career*
Years	Team	Apps	(Gls)
2012–2018	Karpaty Lviv	9	(1)
2018	→ Lviv (loan)	1	(0)
2018–2019	Buchonia Flieden	11	(4)
2019–2021	Olimpik Donetsk	37	(2)
2021–2022	Desna Chernihiv	18	(3)
2022–2025	Bruk-Bet Termalica	81	(3)
2026–	Slávia TU Košice	4	(2)

International career
2011–2012	Ukraine U16	4	(0)
2011–2012	Ukraine U17	13	(3)
2012–2013	Ukraine U18	9	(0)
2013–2014	Ukraine U19	3	(2)
2019	Ukraine (students)		
- * Club domestic league appearances and goals as of 11 November 2026

Taras Zaviyskyi (Ukrainian: Тарас Михайлович Завійський; born 12 April 1995) is a Ukrainian professional footballer who plays as a right-back or midfielder.

== Club career ==
Zaviyskyi is the product of the Karpaty Lviv School System, where he started training at the age of ten. His first trainer was Mykola Dudarenko.

=== Karpaty Lviv ===
In 2012, he started his career with Karpaty Lviv in Ukrainian Premier League. He made his debut entering as a second-half substitute against Metalurh Zaporizhya on 15 March 2013. On 29 October 2016, he scored against Dynamo Kyiv at the NSC Olimpiyskiy.

=== Olimpik Donetsk ===
In the summer of 2019, he signed a contract with fellow Ukrainian Premier League side Olimpik Donetsk. On 12 July 2020 he scored two goals in a 1–4 win over Mariupol.

=== Desna Chernihiv ===
On 15 July 2021, he signed a contract for two years with Desna Chernihiv . On 25 July 2021, he made his league debut with the new club against Chornomorets Odesa, scoring a goal in a 3–0 victory. On 14 August 2021, he scored against SC Dnipro-1. On 7 November 2021, he scored against Lviv at the Arena Lviv.

=== Bruk-Bet Termalica ===
On 21 June 2022, Zaviyskyi joined Polish I liga side Bruk-Bet Termalica Nieciecza on a two-year deal with an extension option. On 15 July, he made his debut against Odra Opole.

He was released by the club upon the expiration of his contract on 30 June 2025.

== International career ==
He represented Ukraine at multiple youth levels, including under-16, under-17, under-18 and under-19.

== Career statistics ==
As of match played 11 November 2026

Appearances and goals by club, season and competition
Club	Season	League			National cup (Note: Includes Ukrainian Cup, Polish Cup)		Europe		Other		Total	
Club	Season	Division	Apps	Goals	Apps	Goals	Apps	Goals	Apps	Goals	Apps	Goals
Karpaty Lviv	2012–13	Ukrainian Premier League	2	0	0	0	—		0	0	2	0
Karpaty Lviv	2013–14	Ukrainian Premier League	0	0	0	0	—		0	0	0	0
Karpaty Lviv	2014–15	Ukrainian Premier League	0	0	0	0	—		0	0	0	0
Karpaty Lviv	2015–16	Ukrainian Premier League	0	0	0	0	—		0	0	0	0
Karpaty Lviv	2016–17	Ukrainian Premier League	7	1	0	0	—		0	0	7	1
Karpaty Lviv	Total		9	1	0	0	—		0	0	9	1
Lviv (loan)	2017–18	Ukrainian Second League	1	0	0	0	—		0	0	1	0
Buchonia Flieden	2018–19	Hessenliga	11	4	0	0	—		0	0	11	4
Olimpik Donetsk	2019–20	Ukrainian Premier League	20	2	2	0	—		0	0	22	2
Olimpik Donetsk	2020–21	Ukrainian Premier League	17	0	1	0	—		0	0	18	0
Olimpik Donetsk	Total		37	2	3	0	—		0	0	40	2
Desna Chernihiv	2021–22	Ukrainian Premier League	18	3	1	0	—		0	0	19	3
Bruk-Bet Termalica	2022–23	I liga	22	0	1	0	—		2 (Note: Appearances in I liga promotion play-offs)	0	25	0
Bruk-Bet Termalica	2023–24	I liga	30	3	1	0	—		—		31	3
Bruk-Bet Termalica	2024–25	I liga	26	0	1	0	—		—		27	0
Bruk-Bet Termalica	Total		81	3	3	0	—		—		84	3
Slávia TU Košice	2025–26	2. Liga	4	2	0	0	—		0	0	4	2
Slávia TU Košice	2026–27	2. Liga	0	0	1	0	—		0	0	1	0
Total			4	2	1	0	—		—		5	2
Career total			158	15	8	0	—		2	0	168	15
