= Piast Nowa Ruda =

Polish football club

- Full name: Klub Sportowy; Piast Nowa Ruda
- Founded: 11 July 1946; 79 years ago (as KS Nowa Ruda)
- Ground: Stadion Centrum Turystyczno-Sportowego
- Capacity: 1,852
- Chairman: Dawid Szukiełowicz
- Manager: Karol Ulatowski
- League: IV liga Lower Silesia
- 2023–24: IV liga Lower Silesia, 10th of 18
Home colours	Away colours

KS Piast Nowa Ruda is a Polish sports club from Nowa Ruda in Lower Silesia. Its football teams include junior and women's teams. The club also has archery, athletics, swimming, volleyball, table tennis and skiing sections.

== History ==
On 11 July 1946, a sports club was established by the local coal mine by the name KS Nowa Ruda and its history has been intertwined with that of the local mine. That same year the name changed to Klub Sportowy Węglowiec. In 1949, another name change meant that the club was called KS Górnik. In 1955, a merger of the club with another local team Włókniarz Nowa Ruda caused the new club to become ZKS Piast Nowa Ruda, a name which became legally recognised in 1957. Under the decision of the Minister of Mining and Energy in 1972, another merger took place when the local mine in Nowa Ruda was merged with another in Słupiec to become one, which meant that its two football teams also merged, therefore ZKS Górnik Słupiec merged with Piast to become GKS Piast Nowa Ruda, before finally reverting it original prefix KS in 1992, a name which remains to this day. The club's biggest footballing achievements came in the mid-1980s and early 1990s where the team has enjoyed spells in the higher leagues, including a season in the second highest division and several in the third tier.

== Honours ==
- II liga
  - Third place: 1987–88
- III liga
  - Champions: 1985–86
  - 3rd place: 1989–90
- Polish Cup
  - Round of 16: 1984–85

== Fans ==
While Piast has a relatively small but loyal following, many Piast fans also follow the local powerhouse WKS Śląsk Wrocław. The Piast fanbase has good relationships with fans of Nysa Zgorzelec, Polonia Bystrzyca Kłodzka, Bielawianka Bielawa and Kryształ Stronie Śląskie. Local rivals include Górnik Wałbrzych, Lechia Dzierżoniów and Moto-Jelcz Oława.
