= Denys Demyanenko =

Ukrainian footballer

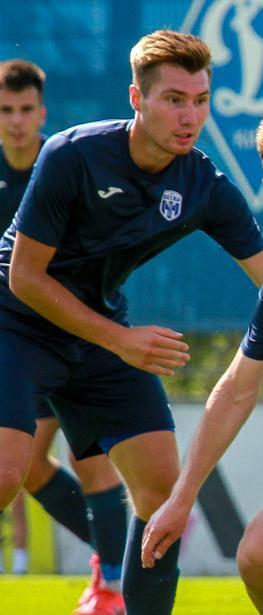
- Demyanenko with Desna-2 Chernihiv in 2020

Personal information
- Full name: Denys Anatoliyovych Demyanenko
- Date of birth: 5 July 2000 (age 26)
- Place of birth: Kyiv, Ukraine
- Height: 1.85 m (6 ft 1 in)
- Position: Defensive midfielder

Youth career
- 2013–2018: Atlet Kyiv
- 2018–2021: Desna-2 Chernihiv

Senior career*
Years	Team	Apps	(Gls)
2019–2022	Desna Chernihiv	1	(0)
2022–2023	Cosmos Nowotaniec	44	(8)
2023–2024	Karpaty Krosno	29	(3)
2024–2025	Stal Kraśnik	30	(17)
2025–2026	Lewart Lubartów	15	(4)
2026	Motor Lublin II	13	(3)
- * Club domestic league appearances and goals as of 08:12, 7 July 2026 (UTC)

Denys Anatoliyovych Demyanenko (Ukrainian: Денис Анатолійович Дем'яненко; born 5 July 2000) is a Ukrainian professional footballer who plays as a defensive midfielder.

== Career ==
Born in Kyiv, Demyanenko is a product of the local Atlet youth sportive school system.

=== Desna-2 Chernihiv ===
In September 2018, he signed a deal with Ukrainian Premier League club Desna Chernihiv, the main team in the city of Chernihiv. He was also part of Desna-2 Chernihiv, for whom he played 35 matches and scored 7 goals.

=== Desna Chernihiv ===
He also made his debut for the senior team on 26 February 2021, coming on off the bench in a home win against Inhulets Petrove.

=== Karpaty Krosno ===
On 19 July 2023, he joined III liga club Karpaty Krosno on a deal until June 2024.

=== Stal Kraśnik ===
On 10 July 2024, Demyanenko moved to IV liga Lublin club Stal Kraśnik.

== Personal life ==
Denys is a son of a Ukrainian football coach and former football defender Anatoliy Demyanenko.

== Career statistics ==
As of match played 13 June 2026

Appearances and goals by club, season and competition
Club	Season	League			National cup		Europe		Other		Total	
Club	Season	Division	Apps	Goals	Apps	Goals	Apps	Goals	Apps	Goals	Apps	Goals
Desna Chernihiv	2020–21	Ukrainian Premier League	1	0	0	0	—		—		1	0
Cosmos Nowotaniec	2021–22	Regional league gr. Krosno	14	4	—		—		—		14	4
Cosmos Nowotaniec	2022–23	IV liga Subcarpathia	30	4	—		—		—		30	4
Cosmos Nowotaniec	Total		44	8	—		—		—		44	8
Karpaty Krosno	2023–24	III liga, group IV	29	3	—		—		—		29	3
Stal Kraśnik	2024–25	IV liga Lublin	30	17	—		—		—		30	17
Lewart Lubartów	2025–26	IV liga Lublin	15	4	—		—		—		15	4
Motor Lublin II	2025–26	IV liga Lublin	13	3	—		—		—		13	3
Career total			132	35	0	0	0	0	0	0	132	35

== Honours ==
Cosmos Nowotaniec

- IV liga Subcarpathia: 2022–23
- Regional league, group Krosno: 2021–22
- Polish Cup (Krosno regionals): 2022–23

Stal Kraśnik

- IV liga Lublin: 2024–25
