= Renat Mochulyak =

Ukrainian footballer

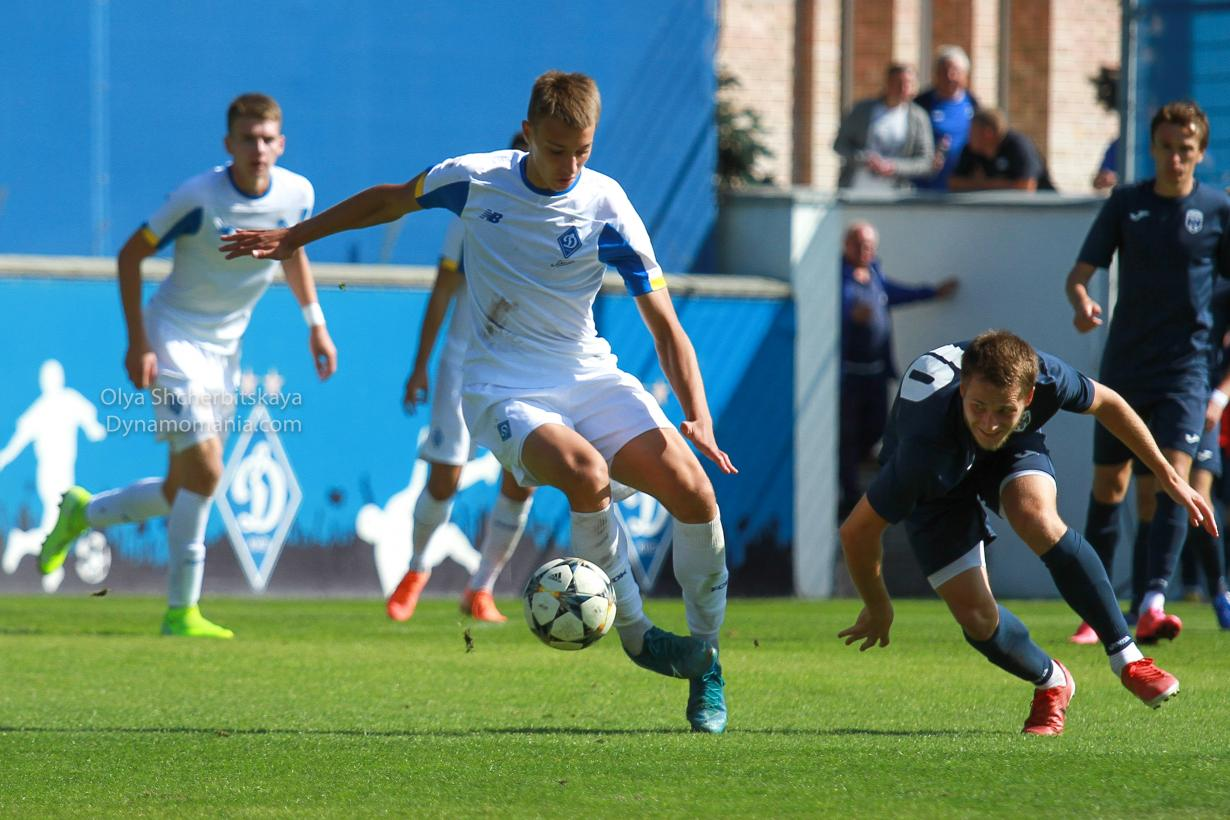

Personal information
- Full name: Renat Olehovych Mochulyak
- Date of birth: 15 February 1998 (age 28)
- Place of birth: Odesa, Ukraine
- Height: 1.78 m (5 ft 10 in)
- Position: Midfielder

Team information
- Current team: Lüner SV
- Number: 10

Youth career
- 2011–2012: Chornomorets Odesa
- 2012–2015: Dynamo Kyiv

Senior career*
Years	Team	Apps	(Gls)
2015–2016	Dynamo Kyiv	0	(0)
2016	→ Dynamo-2 Kyiv	2	(0)
2017	Platanias	0	(0)
2017–2018	Chornomorets Odesa	0	(0)
2019–2020	→ Sfîntul Gheorghe (loan)	15	(2)
2019–2021	Desna Chernihiv	1	(0)
2021	Livyi Bereh Kyiv	6	(0)
2022	Ahrobiznes Volochysk	0	(0)
2023–2026	VfL Kamen	1	(0)
2026–	Lüner SV	11	(3)

International career^{‡}
2014	Ukraine U16	6	(1)
2014	Ukraine U17	7	(3)
- * Club domestic league appearances and goals as of 20 November 2026 ‡ National team caps and goals as of 6 January 2021

Renat Olehovych Mochulyak (Ukrainian: Ренат Олегович Мочуляк; born 15 February 1998) is a Ukrainian professional footballer who plays as a midfielder for Lüner SV.

== Career ==
Mochulyak began his playing career with FC Chornomorets and FC Dynamo Kyiv youth teams. Then at 18 he was promoted to FC Dynamo-2 Kyiv in the Ukrainian First League. He made his first team debut entering as a second-half substitute against FC Avanhard Kramatorsk on 2 April 2016.In December 2016 he signed a contract with Greek club Platanias.

=== Desna-2 Chernihiv ===
In 2018 he moved to Desna 2 Chernihiv, the reserve squad of the main club in Chernihiv. On 29 May 2015 he made his debut with the senior team Desna Chernihiv against Chornomorets Odesa in Ukrainian Premier League in the season 2018-19. He played with Desna 2 Chernihiv, 24 matches and scored 4 goals. On 10 May 2019 he missed a penalty against Lviv.

=== Sfântul Gheorghe Suruceni (Loan) ===
In the winter transfer 2020, he went on loan to Sfântul Gheorghe Suruceni, where he got into the final of the Moldovan Cup in 2019–20.

=== Desna Chernihiv ===
In January 2021, after the good experience in Moldova, he returned to Desna Chernihiv in Ukrainian Premier League. On 31 January 2021, he played in the friendly match against PFC Lokomotiv Tashkent in Turkey. He played most of the matches in Desna-2 Chernihiv.

=== Desna-3 Chernihiv ===
On 21 August 2021 he received a yellow card against Dynamo Kyiv in the Ukrainian Premier League Reserves. On 28 August 2021 he scored for Desna-3 Chernihiv against Veres Rivne at the Chernihiv Arena in the 31st minute.

=== Livyi Bereh Kyiv ===
In October 2021 he moved to Livyi Bereh Kyiv in the Ukrainian Second League. On 2 October 2021 he made his debut against Karpaty Halych in the Ukrainian Second League and 4 days later he played against Chernihiv.

=== Ahrobiznes Volochysk ===
In February 2022 he moved to Ahrobiznes Volochysk in Ukrainian First League.

=== VfL Kamen ===
He signed for VfL Kamen in Landesliga Westfalen.

== International career ==
In 2014 Mochulyak was called up to the Ukraine national under-16 football team where he played 6 matches and scored 1 goal. He was also called up to the Ukraine national under-17 football team where he played 7 matches and scored 3 goals.

== Personal life ==
His father Oleh Mochulyak was also a professional football player, who played for Chornomorets Odesa, Chornomorets-2 Odesa, SC Odesa, Ivan Odesa, Tavriya Simferopol, Nyva Ternopil e Atyrau.

== Career statistics ==
=== Club ===
As of match played 20 November 2026

Appearances and goals by club, season and competition
Club	Season	League			Cup		Europe		Other		Total	
Club	Season	Division	Apps	Goals	Apps	Goals	Apps	Goals	Apps	Goals	Apps	Goals
Dynamo-2 Kyiv	2015–16	Ukrainian First League	2	0	0	0	0	0	0	0	2	0
Chornomorets Odesa	2017–18	Ukrainian Premier League	0	0	0	0	0	0	0	0	0	0
Desna Chernihiv	2018–19	Ukrainian Premier League	1	0	0	0	0	0	0	0	1	0
Desna Chernihiv	2020–21	Ukrainian Premier League	0	0	0	0	0	0	0	0	0	0
Desna Chernihiv	2021–22	Ukrainian Premier League	0	0	0	0	0	0	0	0	0	0
Desna Chernihiv	Total		1	0	0	0	0	0	0	0	1	0
Sfîntul Gheorghe (loan)	2020–21	Moldovan National Division	15	2	3	1	2	0	0	0	20	3
Livyi Bereh Kyiv	2021–22	Ukrainian Second League	6	0	0	0	0	0	0	0	6	0
Ahrobiznes Volochysk	2021–22	Ukrainian First League	0	0	0	0	0	0	0	0	0	0
Lüner SV	2026–27	Westfalenliga	11	3	2	0	0	0	0	0	13	3
Career total			35	5	5	1	2	0	0	0	42	5

== Honours ==
Sfîntul Gheorghe

- Moldovan Cup runner-up: 2019–20
