= 2020–21 FC Desna Chernihiv season =

FC Desna Chernihiv
2020–21 season
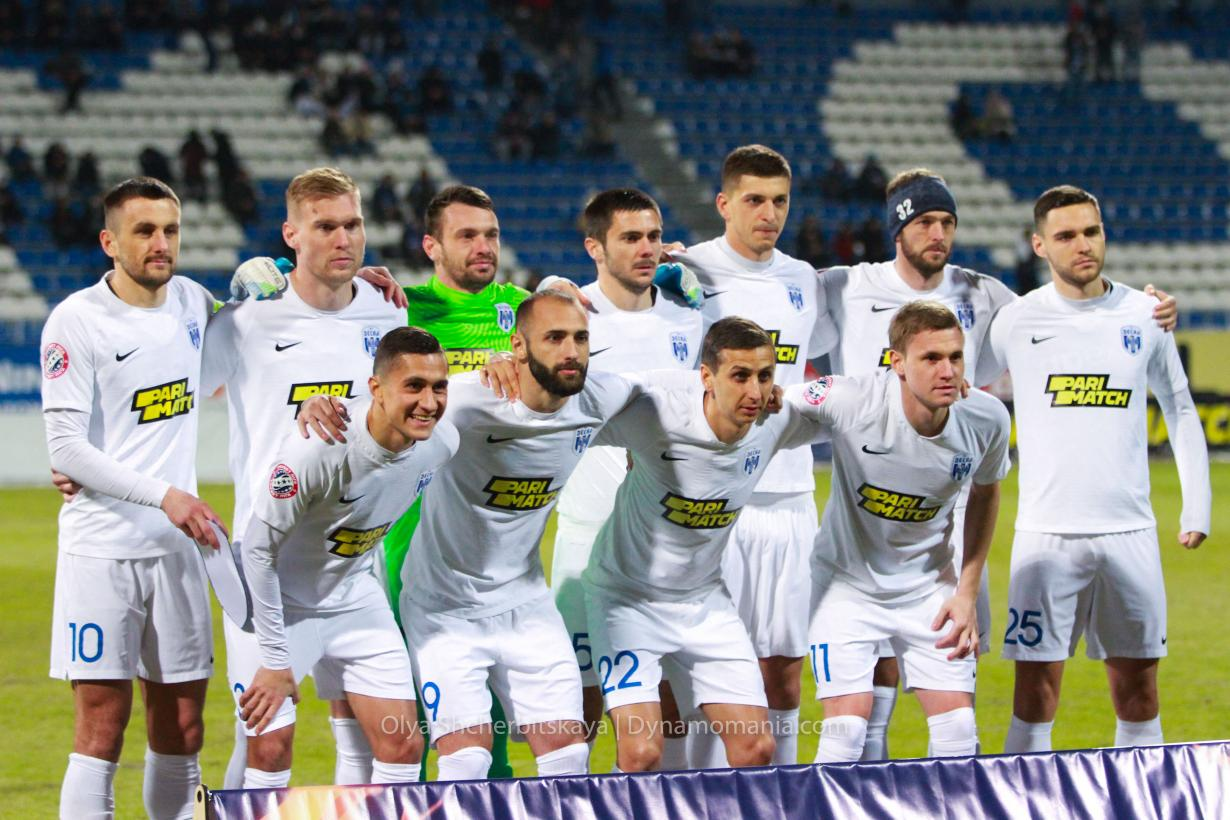
- Chairman: Volodymyr Levin
- Manager: Oleksandr Ryabokon
- Stadium: Chernihiv Stadium
- Ukrainian Premier League: 6th
- Ukrainian Cup: Round of 16
- UEFA Europa League: Third qualifying round
- Top goalscorer: League: Andriy Totovytskyi (9); All: Andriy Totovytskyi (9)
- Highest home attendance: 2,983 (vs Dynamo Kyiv, 21 February 2021)
- Lowest home attendance: 0
- Average home league attendance: 561
Home colours	Away colours

The 2020–21 season was FC Desna Chernihiv's 61st season in existence and the club's third consecutive season in the top flight of Ukrainian football. In addition to the domestic league, Desna Chernihiv participated in this season's editions of the Ukrainian Cup and the UEFA Europa League. The season covers the period from August 2020 to 30 June 2021.

== Players ==
=== Squad information ===
As of 30 June 2021

Squad no.	Name	Nationality	Position	Date of birth (age)
Goalkeepers
44	Yevhen Past	(Ukraine)	GK	16 March 1988 (aged 33)
72	Ihor Lytovka	(Ukraine)	GK	5 June 1988 (aged 33)
79	Illya Karavashchenko^{List B}	(Ukraine)	GK	25 June 2001 (aged 20)
78	Dmytro Sydorenko^{List B}	(Ukraine)	GK	12 November 2002 (aged 18)
Defenders
3	Pavlo Polehenko	(Ukraine)	DF	6 January 1995 (aged 26)
4	Joonas Tamm	(Estonia)	DF	2 February 1992 (aged 29)
5	Vitaliy Yermakov	(Ukraine)	DF	7 June 1992 (aged 29)
6	Constantin Dima	(Romania)	DF	21 July 1999 (aged 21)
17	Andriy Hitchenko	(Ukraine)	DF	2 October 1984 (aged 36)
22	Andriy Mostovyi	(Ukraine)	DF	24 January 1988 (aged 33)
23	Artem Sukhotskyi	(Ukraine)	DF	6 December 1992 (aged 28)
26	Yukhym Konoplya ^{List B} (on loan from Shakhtar Donetsk)	(Ukraine)	DF	26 August 1999 (aged 21)
32	Maksym Imerekov	(Ukraine)	DF	23 January 1991 (aged 30)
Midfielders
7	Vladyslav Ohirya (Captain)	(Ukraine)	MF	3 April 1990 (aged 31)
8	Andriy Dombrovskyi	(Ukraine)	MF	12 August 1995 (aged 25)
9	Levan Arveladze	(Ukraine) (Georgia (country))	MF	6 April 1993 (aged 28)
11	Vladyslav Kalitvintsev	(Ukraine)	MF	4 January 1993 (aged 28)
12	Yehor Kartushov	(Ukraine)	MF	5 January 1991 (aged 30)
14	Yevhen Chepurnenko	(Ukraine)	MF	6 September 1989 (aged 31)
18	Bohdan Biloshevskyi ^{List B} (on loan from Dynamo Kyiv)	(Ukraine)	MF	12 January 2000 (aged 21)
20	Andriy Totovytskyi	(Ukraine)	MF	20 January 1993 (aged 28)
25	Oleksiy Hutsulyak	(Ukraine)	MF	25 December 1997 (aged 23)
89	Oleksandr Volkov	(Ukraine)	MF	7 February 1989 (aged 32)
88	Giorgios Ermides ^{List B}	(Greece)	MF	8 June 2001 (aged 20)
Forwards
19	Denys Demyanenko ^{List B}	(Ukraine)	MF	5 July 2000 (aged 20)
20	Denys Bezborodko	(Ukraine)	FW	31 May 1994 (aged 27)
28	Pylyp Budkivskyi	(Ukraine)	FW	10 March 1992 (aged 29)
77	Maksym Dehtyarov	(Ukraine)	FW	30 May 1993 (aged 28)
90	Illya Shevtsov	(Ukraine)	FW	13 April 2000 (aged 21)

== Transfers ==
=== In ===
Date	Pos.	Player	Age	Moving from	Type	Fee	Source
Summer
9 August 2020	GK	(Ukraine) Dmytro Sydorenko	18	(Ukraine) Desna-3 Chernihiv	Transfer	Free	
10 August 2020	GK	(Ukraine) Illya Karavashchenko	19	(Ukraine) Desna-2 Chernihiv	Transfer	Free	
12 August 2020	FW	(Ukraine) Maksym Dehtyarov	27	(Ukraine) Olimpik Donetsk	Transfer	Free	
17 September 2020	DF	(Ukraine) Pavlo Polehenko	25	(Ukraine) FC Mariupol	Transfer	Free	
1 August 2020	MF	(Ukraine) Oleksandr Volkov	31	(Ukraine) Kolos Kovalivka	Loan return	Free	
6 August 2020	MF	(Ukraine) Mykhailo Mudryk	19	(Ukraine) Shakhtar Donetsk	Loan	Free	
6 October 2020	MF	(Greece) Georgios Ermidis	19	(Greece) Panionios U-19	Transfer	Free	
Winter
16 January 2021	FW	(Ukraine) Denys Bezborodko	26	(Ukraine) Oleksandriya	Transfer	Free	
29 January 2021	DF	(Romania) Constantin Dima	21	(Romania) Astra Giurgiu	Transfer	100k	
18 February 2021	MF	(Ukraine) Yevhen Chepurnenko	31	(Ukraine) Dinaz Vyshhorod	Transfer	Free	
19 February 2021	DF	(Ukraine) Artem Sukhotskyi	28	(Slovakia) Slovan Bratislava	Transfer	250k	
4 January 2021	MF	(Ukraine) Renat Mochulyak	19	(Moldova) Sfântul Gheorghe Suruceni	Loan return	Free	
13 January 2021	FW	(Ukraine) Vladyslav Vakula	21	(Ukraine) Shakhtar Donetsk	Loan	Free	
25 January 2021	MF	(Ukraine) Bohdan Biloshevskyi	21	(Ukraine) Dynamo Kyiv	Loan	Free	

=== Out ===
Date	Pos.	Player	Age	Moving to	Type	Fee	Source
Summer
8 August 2020	GK	(Ukraine) Maksym Tatarenko	21	(Ukraine) Kudrivka	Transfer	Free	
9 August 2020	DF	(Ukraine) Denys Favorov	29	(Ukraine) Zorya Luhansk	Transfer	Free	
22 September 2020	FW	(Ukraine) Oleksandr Filippov	27	(Belgium) Sint-Truiden	Transfer	€1.5M	
31 July 2020	MF	(Ukraine) Orest Kuzyk	25	(Greece) PAS Giannina	Loan return	Free	
Winter
31 December 2020	FW	(Ukraine) Dmytro Khlyobas	26	(Ukraine) Kolos Kovalivka	Transfer	Free	
4 January 2021	DF	(Ukraine) Artur Zapadnya	30	(Ukraine) Metalist 1925 Kharkiv	Transfer	Free	
11 January 2021	DF	(Ukraine) Serhiy Starenkyi	36	(Ukraine) Dinaz Vyshhorod	Transfer	Free	
8 January 2021	DF	(Ukraine) Mykhailo Mudryk	20	(Ukraine) Shakhtar Donetsk	Loan Return	Free	
31 January 2021	DF	(Ukraine) Vladyslav Vakula	36	(Ukraine) Shakhtar Donetsk	Loan Return	Free	
11 February 2021	MF	(Ukraine) Andriy Slotyuk	20	(Ukraine) Metal Kharkiv	Loan	Free	
19 February 2021	MF	(Ukraine) Yevheniy Belych	20	(Ukraine) Dinaz Vyshhorod	Loan	Free	
2 March 2021	FW	(Ukraine) Illya Shevtsov	20	(Ukraine) Inhulets Petrove	Loan	Free	

== Pre-season and friendlies ==
Win Draw Loss

6 August 2020 Friendly	Dynamo Kyiv U-21 (Ukraine)	2–2	(Ukraine) Desna Chernihiv	Kyiv
17:00 EEST (UTC+03:00)	Isayenko 55', 80'	Report	Kalitvintsev 4'; Filippov 48'	Stadium: Dynamo Training Center

10 August 2020 Friendly	Dinaz Vyshhorod (Ukraine)	1–4	(Ukraine) Desna Chernihiv	Demydiv
17:00 EEST (UTC+03:00)	Bovtruk 50'	Report	Shevtsov 59' (pen.), 65', 79'; Budkivskyi 69'	Stadium: Local stadium

11 August 2020 Friendly	Dynamo Kyiv (Ukraine)	1–2	(Ukraine) Desna Chernihiv	Kyiv
18:00 EEST (UTC+03:00)	Tsyhankov 80'	Report	Filippov 32'; Shevtsov 82'	Stadium: Dynamo Training Center

14 August 2020 Friendly	Desna Chernihiv (Ukraine)	2–0	(Ukraine) Olimpik Donetsk	Bucha
17:00 EEST (UTC+03:00)	Mudryk 40'; Budkivskyi 90'	Report		Stadium: Yuvileynyi Stadium

15 August 2020 Friendly	Shakhtar Donetsk U-21 (Ukraine)	1–4	(Ukraine) Desna Chernihiv
EEST (UTC+03:00)	Goal	Report	Khlyobas 12'; Mudryk 63'; Hutsulyak 78'; Budkivskyi 81'

29 August 2020 Friendly	Obolon Kyiv (Ukraine)	2–5	(Ukraine) Desna Chernihiv	Bucha
17:30 EEST (UTC+03:00)	Medynskyi 35'; 70'	Report	Hutsulyak; Shevtsov; Kartushov; Mudryk; Filippov	Stadium: Obolon training facility

4 September 2020 Friendly	Desna Chernihiv (Ukraine)	0–0	(Ukraine) Polissya Zhytomyr
EEST (UTC+03:00)		Report

5 September 2020 Friendly	Shakhtar Donetsk U-21 (Ukraine)	1–5	(Ukraine) Desna Chernihiv
EEST (UTC+03:00)	Goal	Report	Imerekov 12'; Budkivskyi 31'; Shevtsov 60', 77'; Filippov 69'

25 January 2021 Friendly	Desna Chernihiv (Ukraine)	0–1	(Serbia) Partizan	Turkey
15:00 EET (UTC+02:00)		Report	Bahebeck 55'

30 January 2021 Friendly	Desna Chernihiv (Ukraine)	3–1	(North Macedonia) Shkëndija	Turkey
15:00 EET (UTC+02:00)

31 January 2021 Friendly	Desna Chernihiv (Ukraine)	0–0	(Uzbekistan) Lokomotiv Tashkent	Turkey
15:00 EET (UTC+02:00)		Report

3 February 2021 Friendly	Desna Chernihiv (Ukraine)	4–0	(Ukraine) Ahrobiznes Volochysk	Turkey
EET (UTC+02:00)	Hutsulyak 33'; Tamm 41'; Budkivskyi 43'; Kartushov 76'	Report

4 February 2021 Friendly	Desna Chernihiv (Ukraine)	2–0	(Montenegro) Rudar Pljevlja	Turkey
EET (UTC+02:00)	Bezborodko; Belych	Report

9 February 2021 Friendly	Desna Chernihiv (Ukraine)	2–3	(Latvia) Ventspils	Turkey
EET (UTC+02:00)	Shevtsov 9'; Polehenko 14'		9'; 71'; 81'

== Competitions ==
=== Overview ===
Competition	First match	Last match	Starting round	Final position	Record							
Competition	First match	Last match	Starting round	Final position	Pld	W	D	L	GF	GA	GD	Win %
Ukrainian Premier League	22 August 2020	9 May 2021	Matchday 1	6th	26	10	8	8	38	32	+6	38.46
Ukrainian Cup	30 September 2020	16 December 2020	Round of 32 (1/16)	Round of 16 (1/8)	2	1	0	1	2	2	+0	50.00
Europa League	24 September 2020	24 September 2020	Third qualifying round	Third qualifying round	1	0	0	1	0	2	−2	0.00
Total					29	11	8	10	40	36	+4	37.93

Last updated: 9 May 2021
Source: Competitions

=== Ukrainian Premier League ===
==== League table ====
Pos	Team	Pld	W	D	L	GF	GA	GD	Pts	Qualification or relegation
4	Kolos Kovalivka	26	10	11	5	36	26	+10	41	Qualification for the Europa Conference League third qualifying round
5	Vorskla Poltava	26	11	8	7	37	30	+7	41	Qualification for the Europa Conference League second qualifying round
6	Desna Chernihiv	26	10	8	8	38	32	+6	38	
7	SC Dnipro-1	26	8	6	12	36	38	−2	30	
8	FC Lviv	26	8	5	13	25	51	−26	29 (Note: Head-to-head goal difference: Lviv +1, Oleksandriya -1)	

Source: Ukrainian Premier League
Rules for classification: 1) Points; 2) Head-to-head points; 3) Head-to-head goal difference; 4) Head-to-head higher number of goals scored; 5) Goal difference; 6) Higher number of goals scored; 7) Draw or "Golden match" if two teams tied for title (Article 22, paragraph 3).

==== Results summary ====
Overall								Home						Away					
Pld	W	D	L	GF	GA	GD	Pts	W	D	L	GF	GA	GD	W	D	L	GF	GA	GD
26	10	8	8	38	32	+6	38	8	3	2	24	11	+13	2	5	6	14	21	−7

Last updated: 9 May 2021.

==== Results by round ====
Round	1	2	3	4	5	6	7	8	9	10	11	12	13	14	15	16	17	18	19	20	21	22	23	24	25	26
Ground	H	A	A	H	H	A	A	A	H	H	A	H	H	A	H	H	A	A	H	H	H	A	A	H	A	A
Result	W	D	D	W	D	L	W	D	W	L	D	W	W	L	D	W	W	L	L	W	W	L	L	D	D	L
Position	4	3	6	4	5	7	4	4	4	4	4	3	3	3	4	4	4	4	5	4	4	5	6	5	5	6

Updated to match(es) played on 9 May 2021. Source:
A = Away; H = Home; W = Win; D = Draw; L = Loss

==== Matches ====
22 August 2020 1	Desna Chernihiv	3–1	Zorya Luhansk	Chernihiv
17:00 EEST (UTC+03:00)	Kalitvintsev (yellow card) 30'; Budkivskyi (yellow card) 49', (goal) 74'; Filippov 56' (pen.); Mostovyi (yellow card) 59'; Tamm 62'; Dombrovskyi (yellow card) 74'; Imerekov (yellow card) 90'	Report	Favorov 43'; Grechkin (yellow card) 76'; Kocherhin (yellow card) 90'	Stadium: Chernihiv Stadium; Attendance: 0 Referee: Dmytro Bondarenko
Note: Match was played behind closed doors due to quarantine in Ukraine during COVID-19 pandemic.

11 September 2020 2	Dynamo Kyiv	0–0	Desna Chernihiv	Kyiv
19:00 EEST (UTC+03:00)	Zabarnyi (yellow card) 67'	Report	Kalitvintsev (yellow card) 55'; Dombrovskyi (yellow card) 64'; Hitchenko (yellow card) 74'	Stadium: NSC Olimpiyskiy; Attendance: 0 Referee: Ihor Paskhal
Note: Match was played behind closed doors due to quarantine in Ukraine during COVID-19 pandemic.

19 September 2020 3	Inhulets Petrove	1–1	Desna Chernihiv	Kropyvnytskyi
17:00 EEST (UTC+03:00)	Synyohub (yellow card) 15'; Sichinava (yellow card) 18', (goal) 57'; Kucherenko (yellow card) 47'; Schedryi (yellow card) 65'; Krynskyi (yellow card) 90+3'	Report	Khlyobas (yellow card) 3'; Ohirya (yellow card) 10'; Kalitvintsev (yellow card) 35'; Konoplya (yellow card) 44'; Hitchenko 49'	Stadium: Zirka Stadium; Attendance: 766; Referee: Yuriy Ivanov

29 September 2020 4	Desna Chernihiv	3–1	Rukh Lviv	Chernihiv
19:30 EEST (UTC+03:00)	Mostovyi (yellow card) 9'; Totovytskyi 13' (pen.); Dehtyarov 45'; Yermakov (yellow card) 45+1'; Budkivskyi 71', (yellow card) 77'; Konoplya (yellow card) 87'	Report	Kukharuk (yellow card) 2'; Gliha (yellow card) 13'; Kukharevych (yellow card) 27'; Klymchuk 30'; Mysyk (yellow card) 70'	Stadium: Chernihiv Stadium; Attendance: 597; Referee: Denus Shurman

4 October 2020 5	Desna Chernihiv	2–2	Shakhtar Donetsk	Chernihiv
17:00 EEST (UTC+03:00)	Mostovyi 17'; Totovytskyi 26'; Hutsulyak (yellow card) 83'; Lytovka (yellow card) 90+3'	Report	Kovalenko 4'; Dentinho 79'; Stepanenko (yellow card) 90+3'	Stadium: Chernihiv Stadium; Attendance: 1,300; Referee: Ihor Paskhal

18 October 2020 6	SC Dnipro-1	2–0	Desna Chernihiv	Dnipro
19:30 EEST (UTC+03:00)	Nazarenko 2'; Adamyuk (yellow card) 44'; Dovbyk 50' (pen.); Ihnatenko (yellow card) 77'	Report	Mostovyi (yellow card) 31'; Kartushov (yellow card) 61'	Stadium: Dnipro-Arena; Attendance: 0 Referee: Kateryna Monzul
Note: Match was played behind closed doors due to quarantine in Ukraine during COVID-19 pandemic.

24 October 2020 7	Olimpik Donetsk	0–2	Desna Chernihiv	Kyiv
17:00 EEST (UTC+03:00)	Benito (yellow card) 26'; Zahedi (yellow card) 61'	Report	Shevtsov 24'; Imerekov (yellow card) 30'; Totovytskyi 37', (yellow card) 79'; Hitchenko (yellow card) 48'	Stadium: Dynamo Stadium; Attendance: 0 Referee: Denys Shurman

31 October 2020 8	FC Oleksandriya	2–2	Desna Chernihiv	Oleksandriya
17:00 EET (UTC+02:00)	Myshenko (yellow card) 44'; Tretyakov (yellow card) 50'; Pashayev (yellow card) 70'; Banada 72'; Sitalo 82', (yellow card) 83'	Report	Mostovyi (yellow card) 25'; Hitchenko (yellow card) 28'; Ohirya (yellow card) 34'; Totovytskyi 40' (pen.); Imerekov (yellow card) 65' (yellow-red card) 89'; Budkivskyi 84'	Stadium: CSC Nika Stadium; Attendance: 0 Referee: Yaroslav Kozyk
Note: Match was played behind closed doors due to quarantine in Ukraine during COVID-19 pandemic.

7 November 2020 9	Desna Chernihiv	1–0	FC Mynai	Kyiv
19:30 EET (UTC+02:00)	Mudryk (yellow card) 16'; Budkivskyi 80'; Past (yellow card) 90+4'	Report	Shynder (yellow card) 53'; Mayembe (yellow card) 87'	Stadium: Obolon Arena; Attendance: 0 Referee: Roman Blavatskyi
Note: Match was played behind closed doors due to quarantine in Ukraine during COVID-19 pandemic.

22 November 2020 10	Desna Chernihiv	0–1	FC Lviv	Chernihiv
17:00 EET (UTC+02:00)	Ohirya (yellow card) 31'	Report	Kazlauskas (yellow card) 19'; Hrysyo 21'; Zakharkiv (yellow card) 31'; Rafael Sabino (yellow card) 34'	Stadium: Chernihiv Stadium; Attendance: 0 Referee: Serhiy Boyko
Note: Match was played behind closed doors due to quarantine in Ukraine during COVID-19 pandemic.

29 November 2020 11	Kolos Kovalivka	1–1	Desna Chernihiv	Kovalivka
17:00 EET (UTC+02:00)	Lysenko 12' (pen.); Smyrnyi (yellow card) 24'; Bohdanov (yellow card) 67'	Report	Budkivskyi 27' (pen.); Imerekov (yellow card) 56' (yellow-red card) 90+5'; Konoplya (yellow card) 67'; Mostovyi (yellow card) 88'; Tamm (yellow card) 90+4'	Stadium: Kolos Stadium; Attendance: 0 Referee: Vitaliy Romanov
Note: Match was played behind closed doors due to quarantine in Ukraine during COVID-19 pandemic.

6 December 2020 12	Desna Chernihiv	1–0	Vorskla Poltava	Chernihiv
17:00 EET (UTC+02:00)	Yermakov (yellow card) 30'; Kalitvintsev (yellow card) 74'; Dehtyarov 90+4'	Report	Stepanyuk (yellow card) 19' (yellow-red card) 84'; Yavorskyi (yellow card) 80'	Stadium: Chernihiv Stadium; Attendance: 0 Referee: Kateryna Monzul
Note: Match was played behind closed doors due to quarantine in Ukraine during COVID-19 pandemic.

13 December 2020 13	Desna Chernihiv	2–0	FC Mariupol	Kyiv
17:00 EET (UTC+02:00)	Kartushov 50', (yellow card) 90+2'; Khlyobas 56'; Dombrovskyi (yellow card) 77'	Report	Chobotenko (yellow card) 75'; Bondarenko (yellow card) 79'; Chekh (yellow card) 84'	Stadium: NSC Olimpiyskiy; Attendance: 0 Referee: Oleksandr Shandor
Note: Match was played behind closed doors due to quarantine in Ukraine during COVID-19 pandemic.

13 February 2021 14	Zorya Luhansk	2–1	Desna Chernihiv	Zaporizhia
14:00 EET (UTC+02:00)	Hladkyy 18', 61'; Abu Hanna (yellow card) 45+1'	Report	Totovytskyi 21'; Imerekov (yellow card) 51'; Ohirya (yellow card) 64'; Konoplya (yellow card) 77'; Budkivskyi (yellow card) 90+2'; Kalitvintsev (yellow card) 90+2'	Stadium: Slavutych-Arena; Attendance: 0 Referee: Anatoliy Abdula
Note: Match was played behind closed doors due to quarantine in Ukraine during COVID-19 pandemic.

21 February 2021 15	Desna Chernihiv	1–1	Dynamo Kyiv	Kyiv
19:30 EET (UTC+02:00)	Yermakov (yellow card) 9'; Budkivskyi 53'; Imerekov (yellow card) 57'; Arveladze (yellow card) 69'; Bezborodko (yellow card) 84' (yellow-red card) 86'	Report	Besyedin (yellow card) 45+1'; Rodrigues (yellow card) 69'; Tsyhankov (yellow card) 80', (goal) 90+2' (pen.); Mykolenko (yellow card) 89'	Stadium: Dynamo Stadium; Attendance: 2,983; Referee: Ihor Paskhal

26 February 2021 16	Desna Chernihiv	3–0	Inhulets Petrove	Kyiv
19:00 EET (UTC+02:00)	Totovytskyi 34'; Hitchenko 57'; Yermakov 84'	Report		Stadium: Dynamo Stadium; Attendance: 350; Referee: Andriy Kovalenko

8 March 2021 17	Rukh Lviv	0–4	Desna Chernihiv	Lviv
14:00 EET (UTC+02:00)	Kondrakov (yellow card) 36'; Gliha (yellow card) 40'; Fedorchuk (yellow card) 85'	Report	Budkivskyi (yellow card) 12', (goal) 62' (pen.); Chepurnenko 21'; Kartushov 43'; Hutsulyak 65'; Mostovyi (yellow card) 78'	Stadium: Skif Stadium; Attendance: 980; Referee: Vitaliy Romanov

14 March 2021 18	Shakhtar Donetsk	4–0	Desna Chernihiv	Kyiv
17:00 EET (UTC+02:00)	Tetê 34' (pen.), 80'; Matviyenko (yellow card) 40'; Dodô (yellow card) 67'; Solomon 75', 77'	Report	Ohirya (yellow card) 30'; Imerekov (yellow card) 34'	Stadium: NSC Olimpiyskiy; Attendance: 3,802; Referee: Ihor Paskhal

20 March 2021 19	Desna Chernihiv	0–2	SC Dnipro-1	Chernihiv
17:00 EET (UTC+02:00)	Bezborodko (yellow card) 90+2'	Report	Ćuže 45+1', 90+3'; Dovbyk (yellow card) 51'	Stadium: Chernihiv Stadium; Attendance: 2,073; Referee: Kateryna Monzul

3 April 2021 20	Desna Chernihiv	2–0	Olimpik Donetsk	Chernihiv
19:30 EEST (UTC+03:00)	Totovytskyi 43'; Bezborodko 70'; Sukhotskyi (yellow card) 79'	Report	Kargbo (yellow card) 58'; Benito (yellow card) 68'	Stadium: Chernihiv Stadium; Attendance: 0 Referee: Oleksandr Shandor
Note: Match was played behind closed doors due to quarantine in Ukraine during COVID-19 pandemic.

10 April 2020 21	Desna Chernihiv	4–1	FC Oleksandriya	Chernihiv
19:30 EEST (UTC+03:00)	Imerekov 32'; Konoplya (yellow card) 50'; Totovytskyi 54', 90+2'; Bezborodko (yellow card) 58'; Hutsulyak 78'; Ohirya (yellow card) 80'	Report	Kovalets 29'	Stadium: Chernihiv Stadium; Attendance: 0 Referee: Denys Shurman
Note: Match was played behind closed doors due to quarantine in Ukraine during COVID-19 pandemic.

17 April 2021 22	FC Mynai	3–1	Desna Chernihiv	Uzhhorod
14:00 EEST (UTC+03:00)	Nuriyev 23' (pen.), 39'; Pynyashko 50'	Report	Tamm (yellow card) 23'; Imerekov 56'; Ohirya (yellow card) 58'; Volkov (yellow card) 63'; Kartushov (yellow card) 77'	Stadium: Avanhard Stadium; Attendance: 800; Referee: Vitaliy Romanov

24 April 2021 23	FC Lviv	1–0	Desna Chernihiv	Lviv
19:30 EEST (UTC+03:00)	Renan 44'; Mahmutovic (yellow card) 56'; Dovhyi (yellow card) 68'; Čirjak (yellow card) 82'; Antwi (yellow card) 90+2'; Yakimets (red card) 90+3'	Report	Mostovyi (yellow card) 27'; Kalitvintsev (yellow card) 77'	Stadium: Arena Lviv; Attendance: 0 Referee: Yevhen Aranovskyi
Note: Match was played behind closed doors due to quarantine in Ukraine during COVID-19 pandemic.

1 May 2021 24	Desna Chernihiv	2–2	Kolos Kovalivka	Chernihiv
14:00 EEST (UTC+03:00)	Konoplya (yellow card) 45+1'; Ohirya (yellow card) 47' (yellow-red card) 66'; Kalitvintsev 59'; Kartushov 84'	Report	Bohdanov (yellow card) 27'; Petrov 30', (yellow card) 47'; Churko 53', (yellow card) 63'; Chornomorets (yellow card) 58'; Kucheruk (yellow card) 81'	Stadium: Chernihiv Stadium; Attendance: 0 Referee: Yuriy Ivanov
Note: Match was played behind closed doors due to quarantine in Ukraine during COVID-19 pandemic.

5 May 2021 25	Vorskla Poltava	1–1	Desna Chernihiv	Poltava
19:00 EEST (UTC+03:00)	Thill 18'; Yakubu (yellow card) 62' (yellow-red card) 86'; Sapay (yellow card) 90'	Report	Konoplya (yellow card) 39'; Hitchenko 54'; Tamm (yellow card) 69'; Hutsulyak (yellow card) 90+3'	Stadium: Vorskla Stadium; Attendance: 0 Referee: Kateryna Monzul
Note: Match was played behind closed doors due to quarantine in Ukraine during COVID-19 pandemic.

9 May 2021 26	FC Mariupol	4–1	Desna Chernihiv	Mariupol
14:00 EEST (UTC+03:00)	Muravskyi (yellow card) 37'; Ocheretko 61'; Sikan 63', 79'; Bondarenko (yellow card) 83', (goal) 86'	Report	Konoplya 44'; Hutsulyak (yellow card) 56'; Dombrovskyi (yellow card) 58' (yellow-red card) 62'; Sukhotskyi (yellow card) 69'	Stadium: Volodymyr Boiko Stadium; Attendance: 572; Referee: Mykola Balakin

=== Ukrainian Cup ===
30 September 2020 Round of 32 (1/16)	Desna Chernihiv	2–1	Rukh Lviv	Chernihiv
17:00 EEST (UTC+03:00)	Ohirya (yellow card) 40'; Dehtyarov 75', 81'	Report	Rusyn (yellow card) 45'; Kukharuk (yellow card) 45+1'; Zastavnyi (yellow card) 55'; Tamm 59' (o.g.); Antwi (yellow card) 78'; Kalyuzhnyi (yellow card) 85'	Stadium: Chernihiv Stadium; Attendance: 1,250; Referee: Andriy Kovalenko

16 December 2020 Round of 16 (1/8)	Desna Chernihiv	0–1	Zorya Luhansk	Kyiv
14:00 EET (UTC+02:00)	Konoplya (yellow card) 53'; Past (yellow card) 88'; Hutsulyak (yellow card) 88' (yellow-red card) 89'	Report	Yurchenko 16' (pen.), (red card) 58'; Shevchenko (yellow card) 81'; Abu Hanna (yellow card) 88'	Stadium: Dynamo Stadium; Attendance: 0 Referee: Denys Shurman

=== UEFA Europa League ===
24 September 2020 3Q	Wolfsburg (Germany)	2–0	(Ukraine) Desna Chernihiv	Wolfsburg, Germany
21:15 EEST (UTC+03:00)	Guilavogui 15'; Marmoush (yellow card) 50'; Ginczek 90+2'	Report	Tamm (yellow card) 57' (yellow-red card) 60'; Konoplya (yellow card) 66'; Ohirya (yellow card) 70'; Totovytskyi (yellow card) 88'	Stadium: AOK Stadion; Attendance: 0 Referee: Lawrence Visser

== Statistics ==
=== Appearances and goals ===
No.	Pos	Nat	Player	Total		Premier League		Cup		EL	
No.	Pos	Nat	Player	Apps	Goals	Apps	Goals	Apps	Goals	Apps	Goals
Goalkeepers
1	GK	(Ukraine) UKR	Dmytro Sydorenko	0	0	0	0	0	0	0	0
2	GK	(Ukraine) UKR	Illya Karavashchenko	0	0	0	0	0	0	0	0
44	GK	(Ukraine) UKR	Yevhen Past	23	0	21	0	1	0	1	0
72	GK	(Ukraine) UKR	Ihor Lytovka	7	0	5+1	0	1	0	0	0
Defenders
3	DF	(Ukraine) UKR	Pavlo Polehenko	10	0	7+3	0	0	0	0	0
4	DF	(Estonia) EST	Joonas Tamm	23	1	20	1	2	0	1	0
5	DF	(Ukraine) UKR	Vitaliy Yermakov	18	1	7+9	1	1	0	0+1	0
6	DF	(Romania) ROU	Constantin Dima	1	0	0+1	0	0	0	0	0
17	DF	(Ukraine) UKR	Andriy Hitchenko	22	3	15+5	3	1	0	1	0
22	DF	(Ukraine) UKR	Andriy Mostovyi	23	1	17+3	1	1+1	0	1	0
23	DF	(Ukraine) UKR	Artem Sukhotskyi	10	0	6+4	0	0	0	0	0
26	DF	(Ukraine) UKR	Yukhym Konoplya	25	1	20+2	1	2	0	1	0
32	DF	(Ukraine) UKR	Maksym Imerekov	17	2	15	2	1+1	0	0	0
Midfielders
7	MF	(Ukraine) UKR	Vladyslav Ohirya	27	0	24	0	2	0	1	0
8	MF	(Ukraine) UKR	Andriy Dombrovskyi	23	0	12+8	0	2	0	1	0
9	MF	(Ukraine) UKR	Levan Arveladze	16	0	8+7	0	0+1	0	0	0
10	MF	(Ukraine) UKR	Andriy Totovytskyi	20	9	16+2	9	0+1	0	1	0
11	MF	(Ukraine) UKR	Vladyslav Kalitvintsev	24	1	19+2	1	2	0	1	0
12	MF	(Ukraine) UKR	Yehor Kartushov	25	3	10+13	3	1	0	1	0
14	MF	(Ukraine) UKR	Yevhen Chepurnenko	8	1	4+4	1	0	0	0	0
18	MF	(Ukraine) UKR	Bohdan Biloshevskyi	2	0	2	0	0	0	0	0
25	MF	(Ukraine) UKR	Oleksiy Hutsulyak	27	2	19+5	2	0+2	0	0+1	0
89	MF	(Ukraine) UKR	Oleksandr Volkov	2	0	0+2	0	0	0	0	0
Forwards
19	FW	(Ukraine) UKR	Denys Demyanenko	1	0	0+1	0	0	0	0	0
20	FW	(Ukraine) UKR	Denys Bezborodko	10	1	5+5	1	0	0	0	0
28	FW	(Ukraine) UKR	Pylyp Budkivskyi	19	7	11+5	7	2	0	1	0
77	FW	(Ukraine) UKR	Maksym Dehtyarov	20	4	6+12	2	0+2	2	0	0
90	FW	(Ukraine) UKR	Illya Shevtsov	9	1	2+5	1	1	0	0+1	0
Players transferred out during the season
10	FW	(Ukraine) UKR	Oleksandr Filippov	2	1	2	1	0	0	0	0
13	FW	(Ukraine) UKR	Dmytro Khlyobas	7	1	4+2	1	0+1	0	0	0
14	MF	(Ukraine) UKR	Mykhailo Mudryk	11	0	8+2	0	1	0	0	0
27	MF	(Ukraine) UKR	Serhiy Starenkyi	4	0	0+4	0	0	0	0	0
43	DF	(Ukraine) UKR	Artur Zapadnya	3	0	1+1	0	1	0	0	0

Source: Competitions

Last updated: 9 May 2021

=== Goalscorers ===
Rank	No.	Pos	Nat	Name	Premier League	Cup	Europa League	Total
1	10	MF	(Ukraine)	Andriy Totovytskyi	9	0	0	9
2	28	FW	(Ukraine)	Pylyp Budkivskyi	7	0	0	7
3	77	FW	(Ukraine)	Maksym Dehtyarov	2	2	0	4
4	12	MF	(Ukraine)	Yehor Kartushov	3	0	0	3
4	17	DF	(Ukraine)	Andriy Hitchenko	3	0	0	3
6	25	MF	(Ukraine)	Oleksiy Hutsulyak	2	0	0	2
6	32	DF	(Ukraine)	Maksym Imerekov	2	0	0	2
8	4	DF	(Estonia)	Joonas Tamm	1	0	0	1
8	5	DF	(Ukraine)	Vitaliy Yermakov	1	0	0	1
8	10	FW	(Ukraine)	Oleksandr Filippov	1	0	0	1
8	11	MF	(Ukraine)	Vladyslav Kalitvintsev	1	0	0	1
8	13	FW	(Ukraine)	Dmytro Khlyobas	1	0	0	1
8	14	MF	(Ukraine)	Yevhen Chepurnenko	1	0	0	1
8	20	FW	(Ukraine)	Denys Bezborodko	1	0	0	1
8	22	DF	(Ukraine)	Andriy Mostovyi	1	0	0	1
8	26	DF	(Ukraine)	Yukhym Konoplya	1	0	0	1
8	90	FW	(Ukraine)	Illya Shevtsov	1	0	0	1
				Total	38	2	0	40

Last updated: 9 May 2021

=== Clean sheets ===
Rank	No.	Pos	Nat	Name	Premier League	Cup	Europa League	Total
1	44	GK	(Ukraine)	Yevhen Past	7	0	0	7
1	72	GK	(Ukraine)	Ihor Lytovka	1	0	0	1
				Total	8	0	0	8

Last updated: 9 May 2021

=== Disciplinary record ===
No.	Pos	Nat	Player	Premier League			Cup			Europa League			Total		
No.	Pos	Nat	Player	Booked	(yellow card) (yellow-red card)	Sent off (straight red)	Booked	(yellow card) (yellow-red card)	Sent off (straight red)	Booked	(yellow card) (yellow-red card)	Sent off (straight red)	Booked	(yellow card) (yellow-red card)	Sent off (straight red)
4	DF	(Estonia)	Joonas Tamm	3	0	0	0	0	0	0	1	0	3	1	0
5	DF	(Ukraine)	Vitaliy Yermakov	3	0	0	0	0	0	0	0	0	3	0	0
7	MF	(Ukraine)	Vladyslav Ohirya	7	1	0	1	0	0	1	0	0	9	1	0
8	MF	(Ukraine)	Andriy Dombrovskyi	3	1	0	0	0	0	0	0	0	3	1	0
9	MF	(Ukraine)	Levan Arveladze	1	0	0	0	0	0	0	0	0	1	0	0
10	MF	(Ukraine)	Andriy Totovytskyi	1	0	0	0	0	0	1	0	0	2	0	0
11	MF	(Ukraine)	Vladyslav Kalitvintsev	6	0	0	0	0	0	0	0	0	6	0	0
12	MF	(Ukraine)	Yehor Kartushov	3	0	0	0	0	0	0	0	0	3	0	0
13	FW	(Ukraine)	Dmytro Khlyobas	1	0	0	0	0	0	0	0	0	1	0	0
14	MF	(Ukraine)	Mykhailo Mudryk	1	0	0	0	0	0	0	0	0	1	0	0
17	DF	(Ukraine)	Andriy Hitchenko	3	0	0	0	0	0	0	0	0	3	0	0
20	FW	(Ukraine)	Denys Bezborodko	2	1	0	0	0	0	0	0	0	2	1	0
22	DF	(Ukraine)	Andriy Mostovyi	7	0	0	0	0	0	0	0	0	7	0	0
23	DF	(Ukraine)	Artem Sukhotskyi	2	0	0	0	0	0	0	0	0	2	0	0
25	MF	(Ukraine)	Oleksiy Hutsulyak	3	0	0	0	1	0	0	0	0	3	1	0
26	DF	(Ukraine)	Yukhym Konoplya	7	0	0	1	0	0	1	0	0	9	0	0
28	FW	(Ukraine)	Pylyp Budkivskyi	4	0	0	0	0	0	0	0	0	4	0	0
32	DF	(Ukraine)	Maksym Imerekov	5	2	0	0	0	0	0	0	0	5	2	0
44	GK	(Ukraine)	Yevhen Past	1	0	0	1	0	0	0	0	0	2	0	0
72	GK	(Ukraine)	Ihor Lytovka	1	0	0	0	0	0	0	0	0	1	0	0
89	MF	(Ukraine)	Oleksandr Volkov	1	0	0	0	0	0	0	0	0	1	0	0
			Total	65	5	0	3	1	0	3	1	0	71	7	0

Last updated: 9 May 2021

=== Attendances ===
	Matches	Attendances	Average	High	Low
Premier League	13	7,303	561	2,983	0
Cup	2	1,250	625	1,250	1,250
Total	15	8,553	570	2,983	0

Last updated: 9 May 2021
