= FC Desna-2 Chernihiv =

Association football club

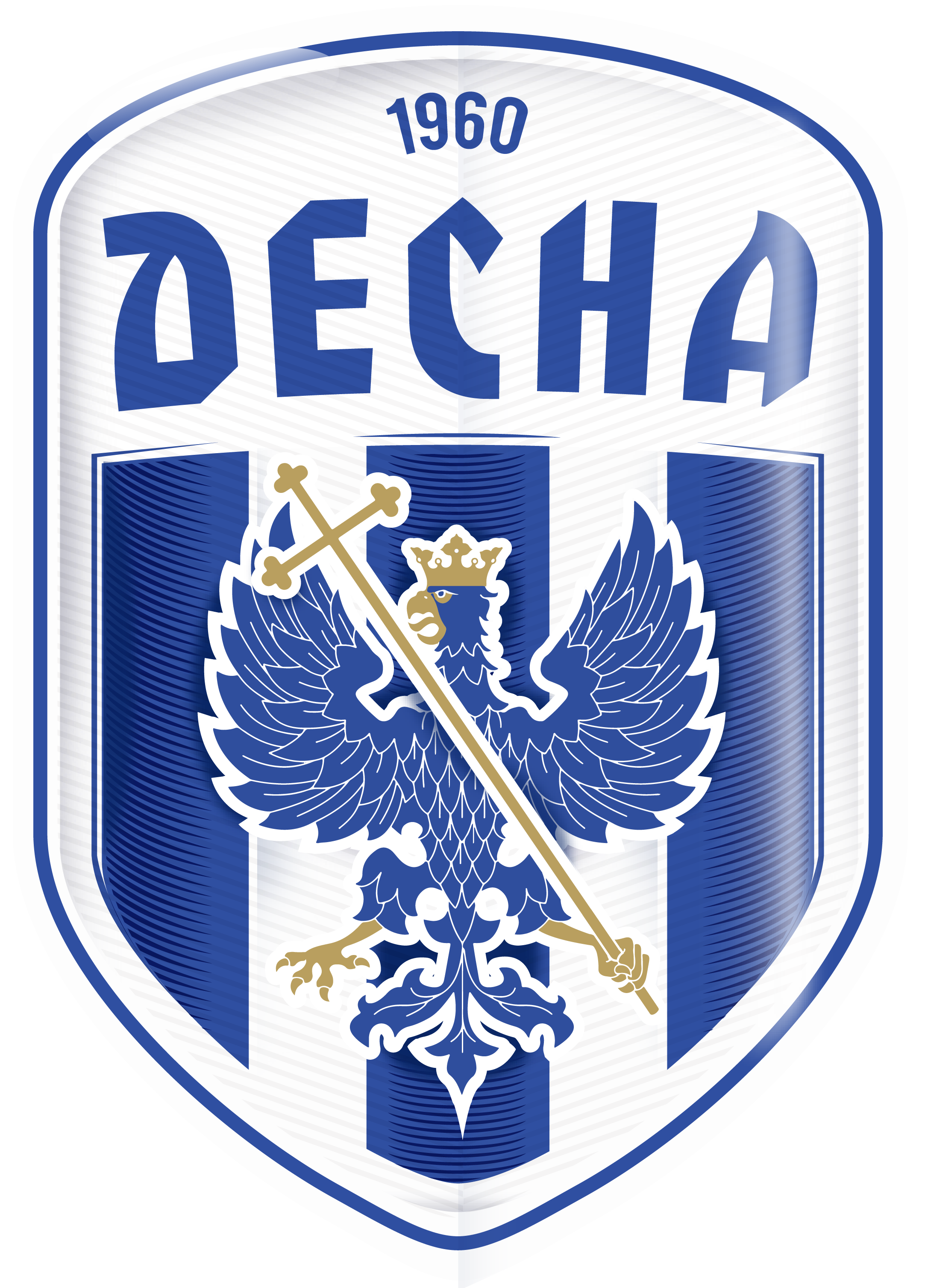
- Full name: FC Desna-2 Chernihiv
- Nickname: Desna Chernihiv U21
- Dissolved: 2022
- Ground: Chernihiv Stadium; Chernihiv Arena; Tekstylnyk Stadium; Lokomotiv stadium
- Capacity: 12,060; 1,000
- Chairman: Volodymyr Levin
- Manager: Oleksandr Datsiuk
- League: Ukrainian Premier League Reserves
- 2020–21: Ukrainian Premier League Reserves, Group A, 13th of 14
- Website: https://desna.football/
Home colours	Away colours

FC Desna-2 Chernihiv (Ukrainian: ФК "Десна-2" Чернігів) is the under-21 reserve squad of Ukrainian football club Desna Chernihiv from the city of Chernihiv.

== History ==
FC Desna-2 entered the professional leagues for the first time in 2008. With the recent successes and improvement the senior team has had, the club entered the Ukrainian Second League to give their players more exposure to higher quality competition. Desna-2 had been competing in the Chernihivska Oblast competition.

Due to the 2022 Russian invasion of Ukraine, on 11 March 2022, the training ground Chernihiv Stadium was badly damaged by a Russian airstrike. The club was dissolved along with the senior team, Desna-3 Chernihiv and the Desna Chernihiv Academy.

== Stadium and facilities ==
The team plays in the Olympic Sports Training Center Chernihiv (formerly Stadion Yuri Gagarin). The stadium, located in Chernihiv, was built in 1936 for 3,000 spectators. Recently the team has been transferred to play in the new modern Chernihiv Arena, which belongs to professional club FC Chernihiv, playing in the Ukrainian Second League.

== Crest ==
The crest of the club, which was created in early 2008, contained an image of an eagle from the coat of arms of Chernihiv and a sign of Chernihiv prince Mstyslav Volodymyrovych.

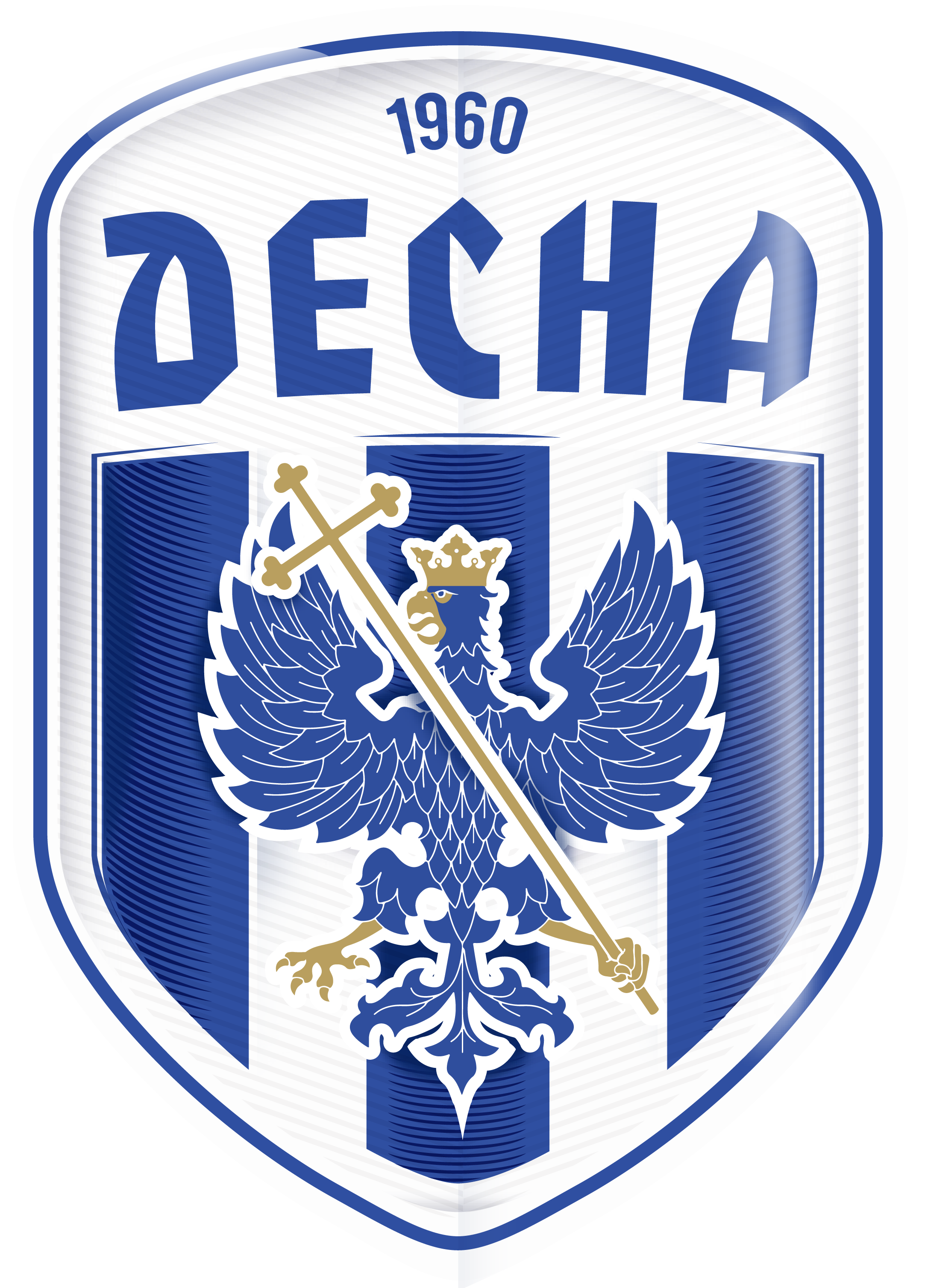
Club emblem from 2016 to the present

== Players ==
=== Current squad ===
Note: Flags indicate national team as defined under FIFA eligibility rules; some limited exceptions apply. Players may hold more than one non-FIFA nationality.

No.	Pos.	Nation	Player
—	MF	UKR	Serhiy Makarenko
—	MF	UKR	Danylo Kibalnyk
—	MF	UKR	Andriy Slotyuk

No.	Pos.	Nation	Player
—	MF	UKR	Bohdan Sheiko
—	FW	UKR	Oleksiy Pashchenko

== Managers ==
- 1985–1994 Oleksandr Sergeevich
- 2004 Andrey Krivenok
- 2008 Serhiy Bakun
- 2016–2017 Serhiy Bakun
- 2017 Oleksandr Datsiuk
- 2019 Oleksandr Pyshchur

== Notable players ==
Players who have played in the club and who have distinguished themselves in some higher leagues above the amateurs and who have also become coaches

- (Armenia) Eduard Halstyan
- (Ukraine) Maksym Tatarenko
- (Ukraine) Teymuraz Mchedlishvili
- (Ukraine) Illya Karavashchenko
- (Ukraine) Illya Shevtsov

== League and cup history ==
=== Ukrainian Amateur League ===
Season	Div.	Pos.	Pl.	W	D	L	GS	GA	P	Domestic Cup	Europe	Notes
2008	4th	5	8	2	1	5	7	10	7			

=== Ukrainian Premier League Under-21 ===
Season	Div.	Pos.	Pl.	W	D	L	GS	GA	P	Domestic Cup	Europe	Notes
2018–19	1st	10	32	7	3	22	22	35	28			
2019–20	1st	9	21	5	3	13	28	44	18			
2020–21	1st	13	26	3	5	18	23	76	14			
2021–22	1st	16	18	2	1	15	9	68	6			Membership suspended

== See also ==
- List of sport teams in Chernihiv
- FC Desna Chernihiv
- FC Desna-3 Chernihiv
- SDYuShOR Desna
- FC Chernihiv
- Yunist Chernihiv
- Lehenda Chernihiv
- Yunist ShVSM
