= Bohdan Biloshevskyi =

Ukrainian footballer

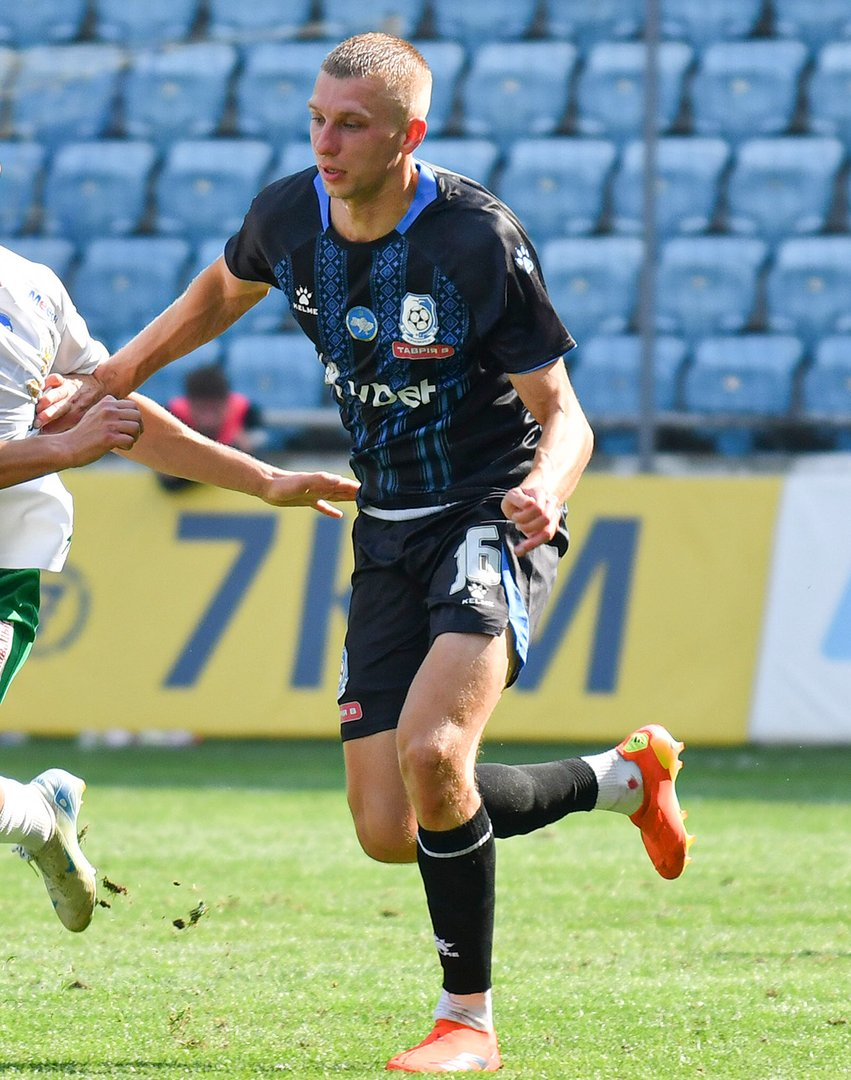

Personal information
- Full name: Bohdan Olehovych Biloshevskyi
- Date of birth: 12 January 2000 (age 26)
- Place of birth: Nizhyn, Ukraine
- Height: 1.87 m (6 ft 2 in)
- Position: Defender

Team information
- Current team: Nyva Ternopil
- Number: 18

Youth career
- 200?–2011: Youth Sportive School Nizhyn
- 2011–2018: Dynamo Kyiv

Senior career*
Years	Team	Apps	(Gls)
2018–2023	Dynamo Kyiv	0	(0)
2021	→ Desna Chernihiv (loan)	2	(0)
2021	→ Chornomorets Odesa (loan)	7	(0)
2022–2023	→ Oleksandriya (loan)	3	(0)
2023–2024	Oleksandriya	9	(0)
2025–2026	Chornomorets Odesa	21	(0)
2026	Poltava	2	(0)
2026–	Sambir-Nyva-2 Ternopil	2	(0)
2026–	Nyva Ternopil	2	(0)

International career^{‡}
2016–2017	Ukraine U17	5	(0)
2017	Ukraine U18	1	(0)
2018–2019	Ukraine U19	4	(0)
2019–2022	Ukraine U21	6	(0)
- * Club domestic league appearances and goals as of 22 November 2026 ‡ National team caps and goals as of 3 September 2025

Bohdan Olehovych Biloshevskyi (Ukrainian: Богдан Олегович Білошевський; born 12 January 2000) is a Ukrainian professional footballer who plays as a defender for Nyva Ternopil.

== Career ==
=== Early years ===
Born in Nizhyn, Biloshevskyi began his career in the local Nizhyn youth sportive school, until his transfer to the Dynamo Kyiv academy in 2011. He played in the Ukrainian Premier League Reserves and never made his debut for the senior Dynamo Kyiv squad.

=== Dynamo Kyiv ===
In May 2021, he returned to Dynamo Kyiv.

==== Loan to Desna Chernihiv ====
In January 2021 Biloshevskyi signed one-year loan contract with the Ukrainian Premier League's side FC Desna Chernihiv and made the debut for this team as a start squad player in an away match against FC Zorya Luhansk on 13 February 2021.

==== Loan to Chornomorets Odesa ====
In summer time he moved on loan to Chornomorets Odesa and on 25 July 2021, he made his debut in Ukrainian Premier League with the new club against Desna Chernihiv at the Stadion Yuri Gagarin and he was sent off at the 39 minute of the first half for a second yellow card.

==== Loan to Oleksandriya ====
In 2022, he was loaned to Oleksandriya in Ukrainian Premier League.

=== Oleksandriya ===
In the summer of 2023, Oleksandriya offered a full contract, but in July 2024 his contract was terminated by mutual agreement.

=== Chornomorets Odesa ===
In summer 2024, Biloshevskyi signed a new contract with Chornomorets Odesa. In July 2025 his contract with the club was extended. On 26 February 2026, he left FC Chornomorets.

=== SC Poltava ===
On 23 April 2026, he signed for Poltava in Ukrainian Premier League.

=== Nyva Ternopil & Sambir-Nyva-2 Ternopil ===
In October 2026, he moved to Nyva Ternopil and Sambir-Nyva-2 Ternopil.

== Career statistics ==
=== Club ===
As of 22 November 2026

Appearances and goals by club, season and competition
Club	Season	League			Cup		Europe		Other		Total	
Club	Season	Division	Apps	Goals	Apps	Goals	Apps	Goals	Apps	Goals	Apps	Goals
Desna Chernihiv (loan)	2020–21	Ukrainian Premier League	2	0	0	0	0	0	0	0	2	0
Chornomorets Odesa (loan)	2021–22	Ukrainian Premier League	7	0	1	0	0	0	0	0	8	0
Oleksandriya (loan)	2022–23	Ukrainian Premier League	3	0	0	0	0	0	0	0	3	0
Oleksandriya	2023–24	Ukrainian Premier League	9	0	2	0	0	0	0	0	11	0
Chornomorets Odesa	2024–25	Ukrainian Premier League	20	0	0	0	0	0	0	0	20	0
Chornomorets Odesa	2025–26	Ukrainian First League	1	0	0	0	0	0	0	0	1	0
Poltava	2025–26	Ukrainian Premier League	1	0	0	0	0	0	0	0	1	0
Sambir-Nyva-2 Ternopil	2026–27	Ukrainian Second League	2	0	0	0	0	0	0	0	2	0
Nyva Ternopil	2026–27	Ukrainian First League	2	0	0	0	0	0	0	0	2	0
Career total			47	0	3	0	0	0	0	0	50	0

== Honours ==
Chornomorets Odesa

- Ukrainian First League runner-up: 2025–26
