= Constantin Dima =

Romanian footballer

Personal information
- Full name: Constantin Cristian Dima
- Date of birth: 21 July 1999 (age 27)
- Place of birth: Bucharest, Romania
- Height: 1.85 m (6 ft 1 in)
- Position: Defender

Youth career
- –2016: Dinamo București

Senior career*
Years	Team	Apps	(Gls)
2016–2018	Dinamo București	0	(0)
2016–2017	→ Metalul Reșița (loan)	25	(1)
2017–2018	→ Sepsi OSK (loan)	24	(0)
2018	Viitorul Constanța	0	(0)
2019–2021	Astra Giurgiu	37	(0)
2021	Desna Chernihiv	1	(0)
2021–2022	UTA Arad	6	(0)
2022–2023	Chindia Târgoviște	1	(0)
2023	Metaloglobus București	7	(0)
2023–2024	Concordia Chiajna	10	(0)

International career
2014–2015	Romania U16	4	(1)
2015–2016	Romania U17	3	(0)
2016	Romania U18	2	(0)
2016–2018	Romania U19	6	(0)
2019	Romania U21	1	(0)
- * Club domestic league appearances and goals as of 11 May 2024

Constantin Cristian Dima (born 21 July 1999) is a Romanian professional footballer who plays as a defender.

== Club career ==
A product of Dinamo București's academy, Dima started his professional career in Liga II side Sportul Snagov, where he played 25 matches and scored once during the 2016–17 campaign.

=== Desna Chernihiv ===
In January 2021, he moved to Desna Chernihiv, signing a three-and-a-half-year contract and becoming the first Romanian player in Desna's history. The club paid 100,000 euros for Dima, with Astra supposed to receive 20% of the amount of any Dima's resale. On 26 February, he made his Ukrainian Premier League debut against Inhulets Petrove at the Valeriy Lobanovskyi Dynamo Stadium, replacing Pylyp Budkivskyi in the second half. On 16 July, he was released by the club.

=== UTA Arad ===
On 4 October 2021, Dima joined UTA Arad in Liga I on a two-year deal.

=== Chindia Târgoviște ===
In the summer of 2022, Dima moved to Chindia Târgoviște in Liga I. On 3 January 2023, he left the club by mutual consent.

=== Metaloglobus București ===
In February 2023, Dima moved to Metaloglobus București in Liga II.

== International career ==
Dima has represented Romania national team at numerous youth level: U17, U19 and U21. In May 2021, he was called up for the Romanian Olympic football team.

== Career statistics ==
As of match played 11 May 2024

Appearances and goals by club, season and competition
Club	Season	League			National cup (Note: Includes Cupa României)		Europe		Other		Total	
Club	Season	Division	Apps	Goals	Apps	Goals	Apps	Goals	Apps	Goals	Apps	Goals
Metalul Reșița (loan)	2016–17	Liga II	25	1	0	0	—		—		25	1
Sepsi OSK (loan)	2017–18	Liga I	24	0	1	0	—		—		25	0
Viitorul Constanța	2018–19	Liga I	0	0	1	0	—		—		1	0
Astra Giurgiu	2018–19	Liga I	3	0	1	0	—		—		4	0
Astra Giurgiu	2019–20	Liga I	25	0	2	0	—		—		27	0
Astra Giurgiu	2020–21	Liga I	9	0	1	0	—		—		10	0
Astra Giurgiu	Total		37	0	4	0	—		—		41	0
Desna Chernihiv	2020–21	Ukrainian Premier League	1	0	0	0	—		—		1	0
UTA Arad	2021–22	Liga I	6	0	0	0	—		—		6	0
Chindia Târgoviște	2022–23	Liga I	1	0	3	0	—		—		4	0
Metaloglobus București	2022–23	Liga II	7	0	—		—		1	0	8	0
Concordia Chiajna	2023–24	Liga II	5	0	—		—		—		5	0
Concordia Chiajna	2024–25	Liga II	5	0	1	0	—		—		6	0
Career total			106	1	9	0	—		1	0	117	1

== Honours ==
Astra Giurgiu

- Cupa României runner-up: 2018–19, 2020–21
