= Serhiy Bakun =

Ukrainian association football manager

Personal information
- Full name: Бакун Сергей Николаевич
- Date of birth: 29 January 1962 (age 64)
- Place of birth: Kyiv, Ukrainian SSR, Soviet Union

Team information
- Current team: Desna Chernihiv U19

Managerial career
- Years: Team
- 2003: Polissya
- 2004–2007: Desna Chernihiv coach
- 2007: Desna Chernihiv Head coach
- 2007–2008: Desna Chernihiv caretaker
- 2008: Desna-2 Chernihiv
- 2009–2011: Yednist-2
- 2016–2017: Desna-2 Chernihiv
- 2008-: Desna-3 Chernihiv

Serhiy Bakun (Ukrainian: Бакун Сергей Николаевич; born 21 February 1964 in Kyiv, in the Ukrainian SSR of the Soviet Union) is a former Ukrainian head-coach of Desna Chernihiv U19.

== Coaching career ==
In 2003 he coached the amateur team "Polissya" (Dobryanka). From 2004 to May 2007 he helped to train Desna Chernihiv, and on May 7, 2007 he was appointed acting head of the Chernihiv club, which he managed until June 25, 2007. After that, until June 2008, he continued to help coach Desna. From June to October 2008, he headed Desna-2 Chernihiv. From 2009 to June 2011 he worked as the head coach of Yednist-2., where he won the Chernihiv Oblast Football Federation in 2009, 2010

== Honours ==
FC Yednist' Plysky 2

- Ukrainian Football Amateur League: 2009
- Chernihiv Oblast Football Federation: (3) 2009, 2010

Desna Chernihiv

- Ukrainian Second League: 2005–06

Polissia Dobrianka

- Chernihiv Oblast Football Federation: (1) 2003
