= Artem Sukhotskyi =

Ukrainian footballer

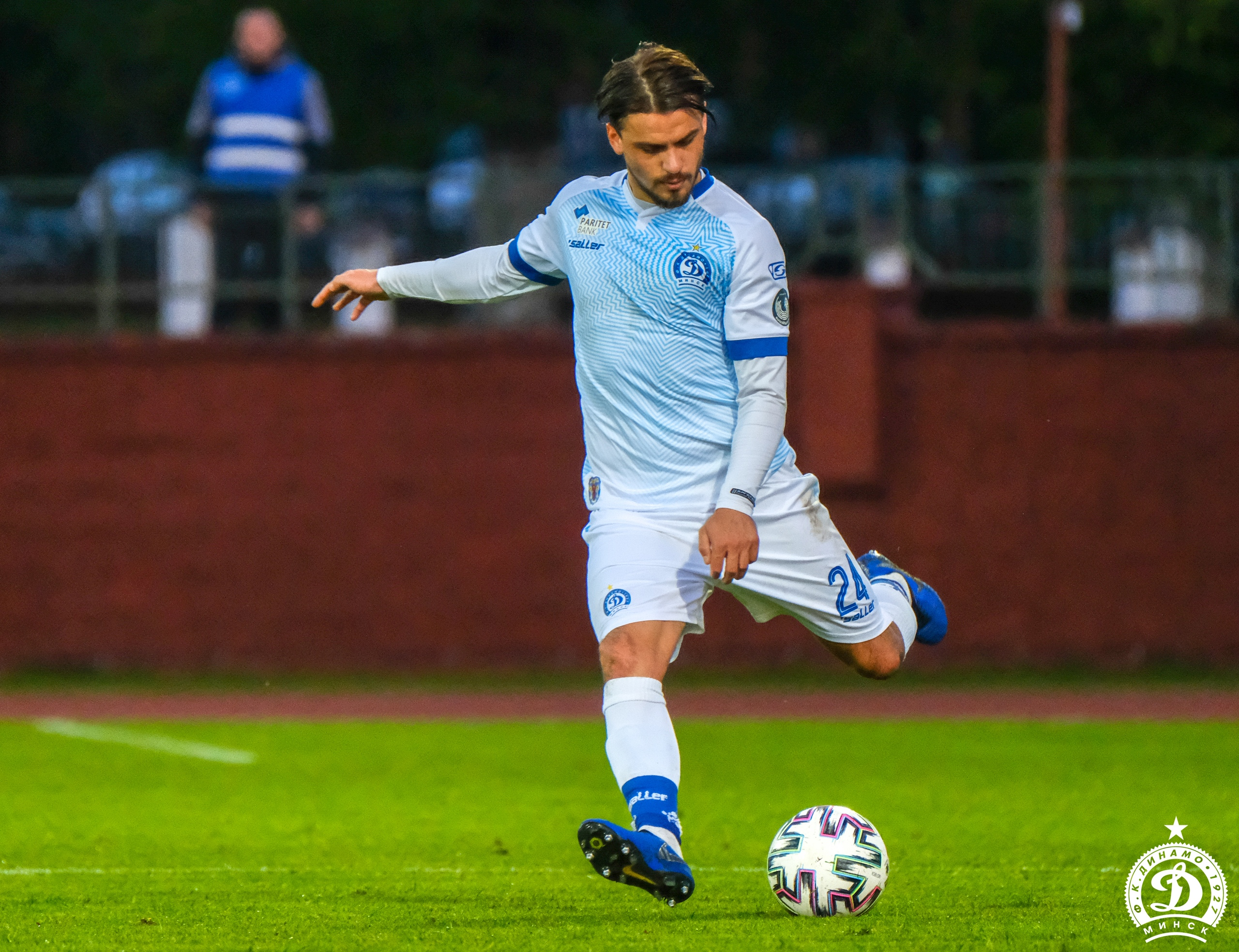
- Sukhotskyi with Dinamo Minsk in 2020

Personal information
- Full name: Artem Mykhaylovych Sukhotskyi
- Date of birth: 6 December 1992 (age 33)
- Place of birth: Nizhyn, Ukraine
- Height: 1.80 m (5 ft 11 in)
- Position: Left-back

Youth career
- 2005–2006: RVUFK Kyiv
- 2006–2009: Dynamo Kyiv

Senior career*
Years	Team	Apps	(Gls)
2009–2011	Dynamo Kyiv	0	(0)
2010–2011	Dynamo-2 Kyiv	33	(0)
2012–2013	Illichivets Mariupol	0	(0)
2013–2016	Oleksandriya	68	(4)
2016–2017	Zorya Luhansk	40	(1)
2018–2020	Slovan Bratislava	38	(3)
2020	→ Slovan Bratislava B	1	(0)
2020	→ Dinamo Minsk (loan)	25	(0)
2021	Desna Chernihiv	10	(0)
2022	Chornomorets Odesa	0	(0)
2024–2025	Zagłębie Sosnowiec	40	(1)
2025–2026	Dainava	3	(0)

International career
2007–2009	Ukraine U16	12	(0)
2009	Ukraine U17	3	(0)
2009–2010	Ukraine U18	12	(3)
- * Club domestic league appearances and goals as of 19 November 2025 (UTC)

Artem Mykhaylovych Sukhotskyi (Ukrainian: Артем Михайлович Сухоцький; born 6 December 1992) is a Ukrainian professional footballer who plays as a left-back.

== Club career ==
He is a product of the Dynamo Kyiv sportive school. On 12 January 2012, Sukhotskyi signed a contract with Illichivets Mariupol in the Ukrainian Premier League.

=== Zorya Luhansk ===
In 2016, he moved to Zorya Luhansk. He made 40 league appearances and scored once for the club, helping them finish third in the 2016–17 season.

=== Slovan Bratislava ===
In January 2018, Sukhotskyi joined Slovak side Slovan Bratislava, with whom he won two league titles, in 2018–19 and 2019–20, as well as the 2019–20 Slovak Cup.

=== Dinamo Minsk ===
In 2020, he moved on loan to Dinamo Minsk where he played 25 match in Belarusian Premier League.

=== Desna Chernihiv ===
On 19 February 2021, Sukhotskyi joined Desna Chernihiv, the main club of Chernihiv, becoming the second most expensive player of the club, after Oleksiy Hutsulyak. On 26 February 2021, he made his league debut for the new club in a 3–0 win over Inhulets Petrove at the Valeriy Lobanovskyi Dynamo Stadium. On 16 July 2021, it was announced he would be leaving the club shortly.

=== Chornomorets Odesa ===
In late December 2021, rumors emerged linking Sukhotskyi with Chornomorets Odesa in Ukrainian Premier League - they were confirmed in January 2022, when he joined the club from Odesa. In June 2022, his contract with the club was terminated.

=== Zagłębie Sosnowiec ===
After spending over one-year-and-a-half without a club, on 15 February 2024 Sukhotskyi joined Polish second division outfit Zagłębie Sosnowiec until the end of the season. After Zagłębie was unable to avoid relegation to the II liga, Sukhotskyi extended his contract with the club for another year on 25 June 2024. He was released by Zagłębie at the end of his contract in June 2025.

=== Dainava ===
On 27 September 2025, Sukhotskyi signed with Lithuanian side Dainava.

== International career ==
In 2007 he was called up to the Ukraine U16, where in two years he managed to play 12 matches. In 2009 he managed to play 3 matches in Ukraine U17. He also played 12 matches and scored 3 goals from 2009 to 2010.

== Career statistics ==
=== Club ===
As of match played 2 November 2025

Appearances and goals by club, season and competition
Club	Season	League			National cup (Note: Includes Ukrainian Cup, Slovak Cup, Belarusian Cup)		Europe		Other		Total	
Club	Season	Division	Apps	Goals	Apps	Goals	Apps	Goals	Apps	Goals	Apps	Goals
Oleksandriya	2013–14	Ukrainian First League	25	1	2	0	0	0	0	0	27	1
Oleksandriya	2014–15	Ukrainian First League	27	2	2	0	0	0	0	0	29	2
Oleksandriya	2015–16	Ukrainian Premier League	16	1	2	0	0	0	0	0	18	1
Oleksandriya	Total		68	4	6	0	0	0	0	0	74	4
Zorya Luhansk	2015–16	Ukrainian Premier League	6	0	4	0	0	0	0	0	10	0
Zorya Luhansk	2016–17	Ukrainian Premier League	17	1	1	0	1 (Note: Appearance(s) in UEFA Europa League)	0	0	0	19	1
Zorya Luhansk	2017–18	Ukrainian Premier League	17	0	1	0	6	0	0	0	24	0
Zorya Luhansk	Total		40	1	6	0	7	0	0	0	53	1
Slovan Bratislava	2018–19	Slovak Super Liga	26	1	0	0	3	0	0	0	29	1
Slovan Bratislava	2019–20	Slovak Super Liga	12	2	3	0	7 (Note: Two appearances in UEFA Europa League, five appearances in UEFA Champions League)	0	0	0	22	2
Slovan Bratislava	Total		38	3	3	0	10	0	0	0	51	3
Slovan Bratislava B	2019–20	2. liga	1	0	0	0	—		0	0	1	0
Dinamo Minsk	2020	Belarusian Premier League	25	0	1	0	1	0	0	0	27	0
Desna Chernihiv	2020–21	Ukrainian Premier League	10	0	0	0	0	0	0	0	10	0
Zagłębie Sosnowiec	2023–24	I liga	12	0	—		—		—		12	0
Zagłębie Sosnowiec	2024–25	II liga	28	1	0	0	—		—		28	1
Zagłębie Sosnowiec	Total		40	1	0	0	—		—		40	1
Dainava	2025	A Lyga	3	0	0	0	—		—		3	0
Career total			225	9	16	0	18	0	0	0	259	9

=== International ===
Appearances and goals by national team and year
National team	Year	Apps	Goals
Ukraine U18
Ukraine U18	2019	6	1
Ukraine U18	2020	7	2
Ukraine U18	Total	13	3
Ukraine U17
Ukraine U17	2009	3	0
Ukraine U17	Total	3	0
Ukraine U16
Ukraine U16	2007	2	0
Ukraine U16	2008	4	0
Ukraine U16	2009	6	0
Ukraine U16	Total	12	0
Career total		28	3

== Honours ==
Oleksandriya

- Ukrainian First League: 2014–15

Slovan Bratislava

- Slovak Super Liga: 2018–19, 2019–20
- Slovak Cup: 2019–20

Zorya Luhansk

- Ukrainian Cup runner-up: 2015–16

== Gallery ==
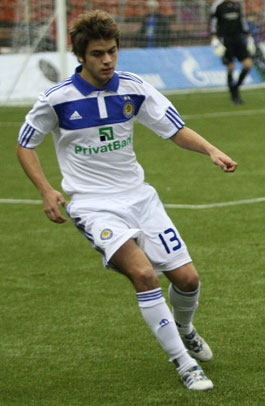
Artem Sukhotskyi during the game for Dynamo Kyiv

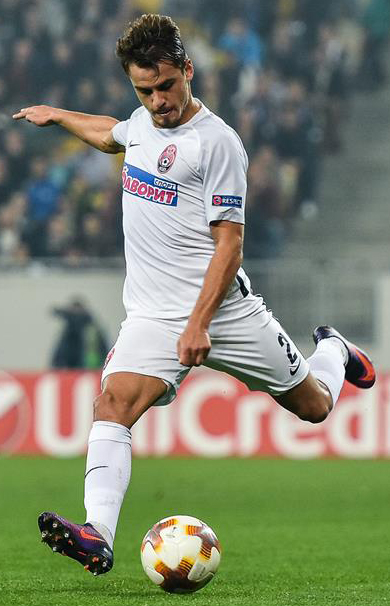
Sukhotskyi with Zorya Luhansk

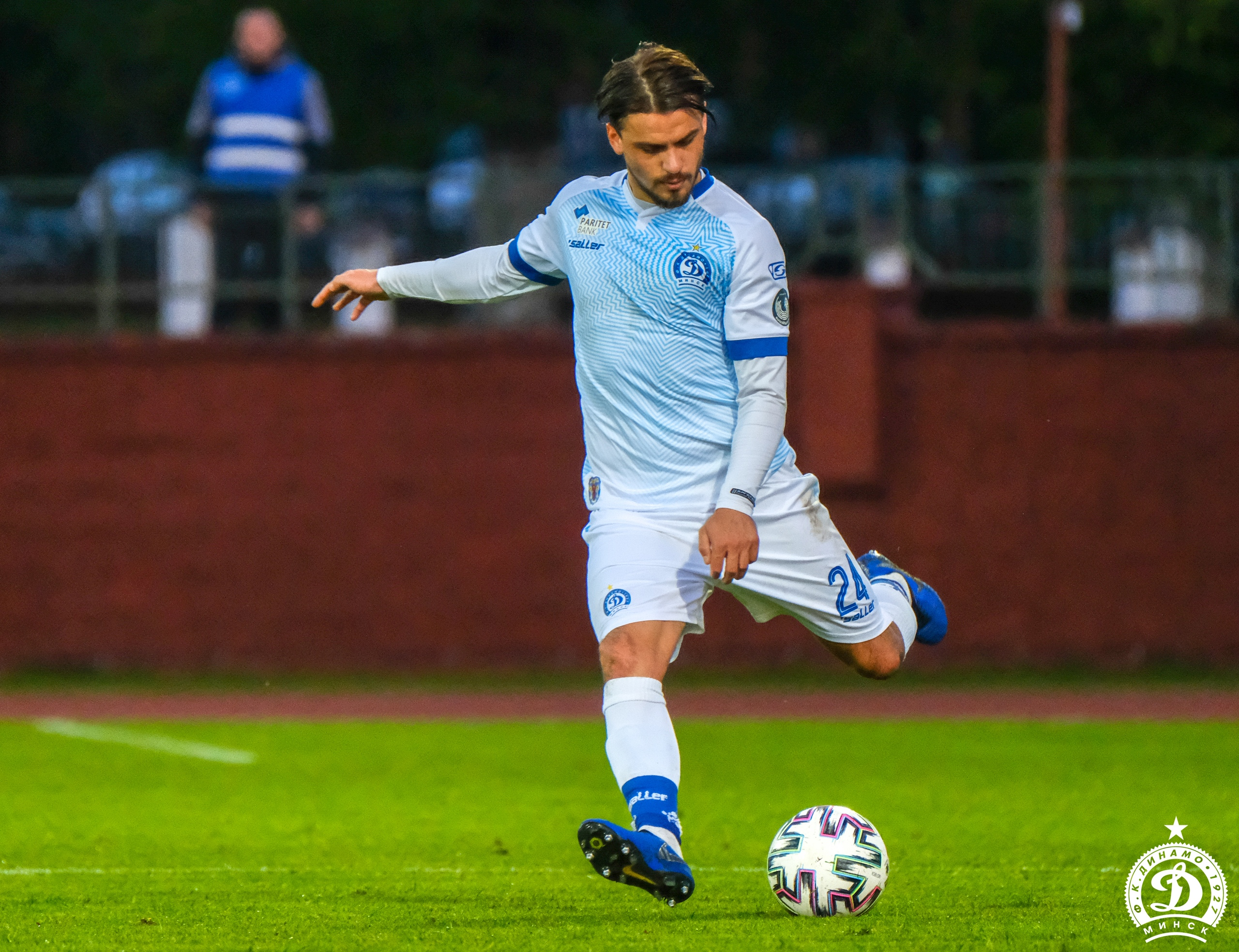
Sukhotskyi with Dinamo Minsk
