= FC Desna Chernihiv junior squads and academy =

Association football club

FC Desna-3 Chernihiv
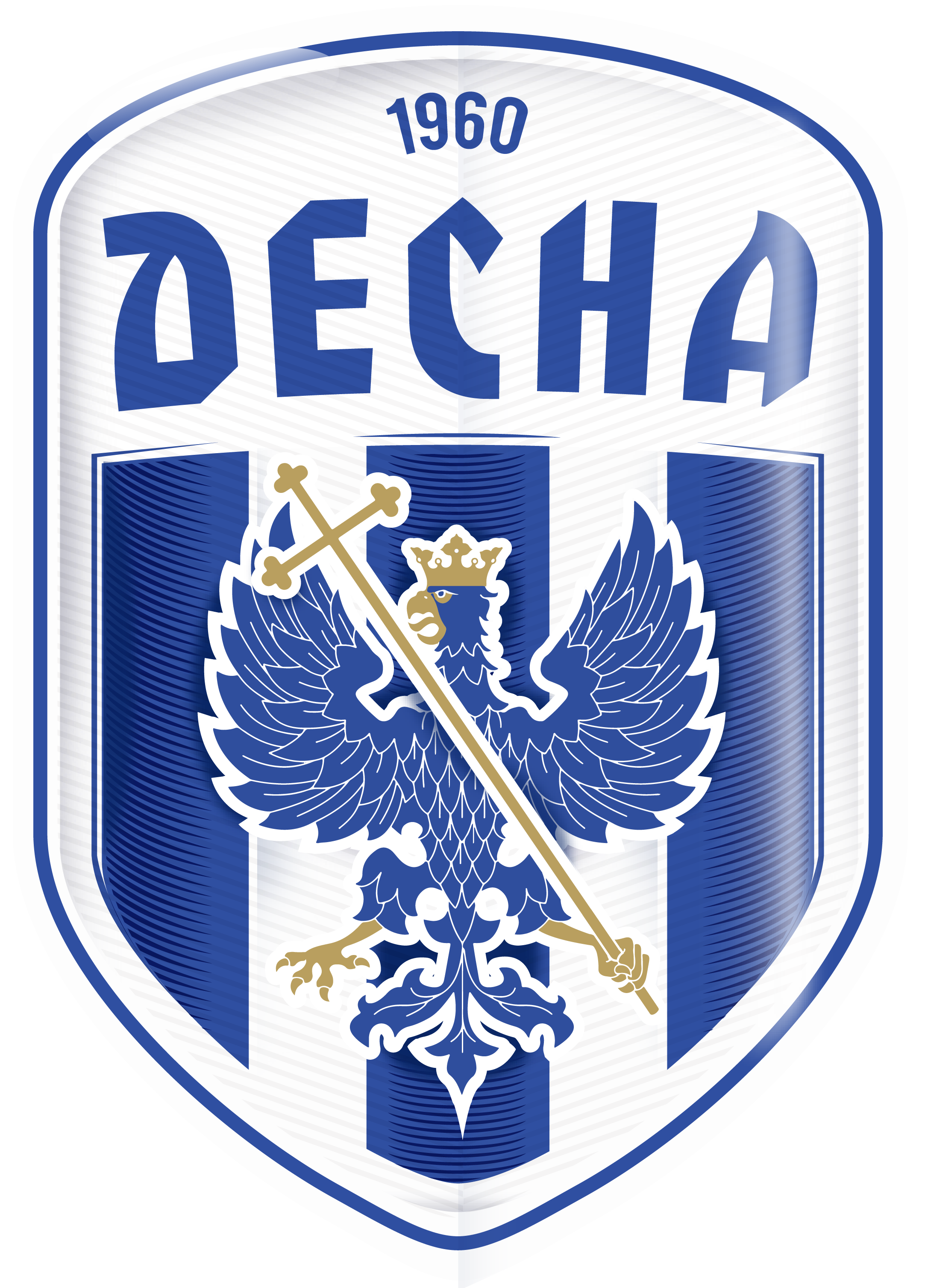
- Full name: FC Desna-3 Chernihiv (Desna Chernihiv Under19)
- Nickname: Desna Chernihiv U19
- Ground: Chernihiv Arena; Chernihiv Stadium; Tekstylschyk stadium Lokomotiv stadium
- Capacity: 12,060; 1,000
- Chairman: Volodymyr Levin
- Manager: Oleksandr Selivanov
- League: Ukrainian Premier League Reserves
- 2020–21: Ukrainian Premier League Reserves, Group A, 13th of 14
- Website: http://desna.football/
Home colours	Away colours

FC Desna-3 Chernihiv (Ukrainian: ФК "Десна-3" Чернігів) is the under-19 reserve squad of Ukrainian football club Desna Chernihiv.

== History ==
=== Origin ===
The club served as a training spot for young prospects, but under the management of new Desna youth coaches and was considered the 3rd squad team or junior team from the Desna Chernihiv franchise. In 2008, the experience manager, Serhiy Bakun, who trained also Desna-2 Chernihiv was appointed as coach.

=== Youth Sector ===
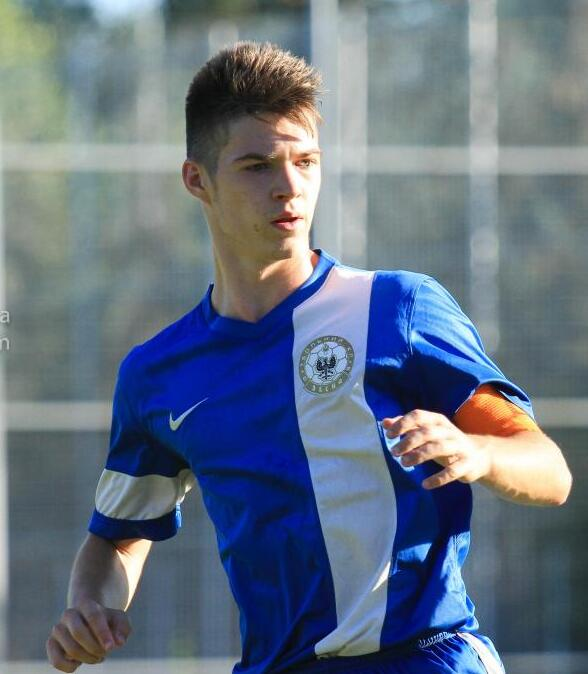
Yevheniy Belych, one of the product of the club

The club has been responsible for producing some of the club's players, including Yevheniy Belych, Oleksandr Pyshchur and Dmytro Sydorenko, Bohdan Lytvynenko, Maksym Shumylo who have managed to become regular players in Ukrainian Second League and abroad.

In September 2021, Artem Khatskevich, (son of Alyaksandr Khatskevich) joyned the club.

Following the transfer ban imposed by Desna Chernihiv, some Desna 19 players, such us Georgios Ermidis, Danyil Pus, Artem Khatskevich, Dzhilindo Bezghubchenko, Bohdan Sheiko, Serhiy Makarenko and Oleksiy Pashchenko have been called up to the first team which left for the preparation in Turkey.

=== Chernihiv Stadium Damaged ===
Some days later, due to the 2022 Russian invasion of Ukraine, the team couldn't return to his home city and on 11 March 2022, the training ground Chernihiv Stadium was badly damaged by a Russian airstrike. The club was dissolved along with the senior team, Desna-2 Chernihiv and the Desna Chernihiv Academy.

=== Reorganized ===
In summer 2025, it was announced that the Desna U19 team from the Ukrainian Youth Football Academy will participate in Ukrainian First League U-19 Championship.

== Stadium and facilities ==
The team plays in the Olympic Sports Training Center Chernihiv (formerly Stadion Yuri Gagarin). The stadium, located in Chernihiv, was built in 1936 for 3,000 spectators. Recently the team has been transferred to play in the new modern Chernihiv Arena, which belongs to professional club FC Chernihiv, playing in the Ukrainian Second League.

== Crest ==
The crest of the club, which was created in early 2008 contained an image of an eagle from the coat of arms of Chernihiv and a sign of Chernihiv prince Mstyslav Volodymyrovych.

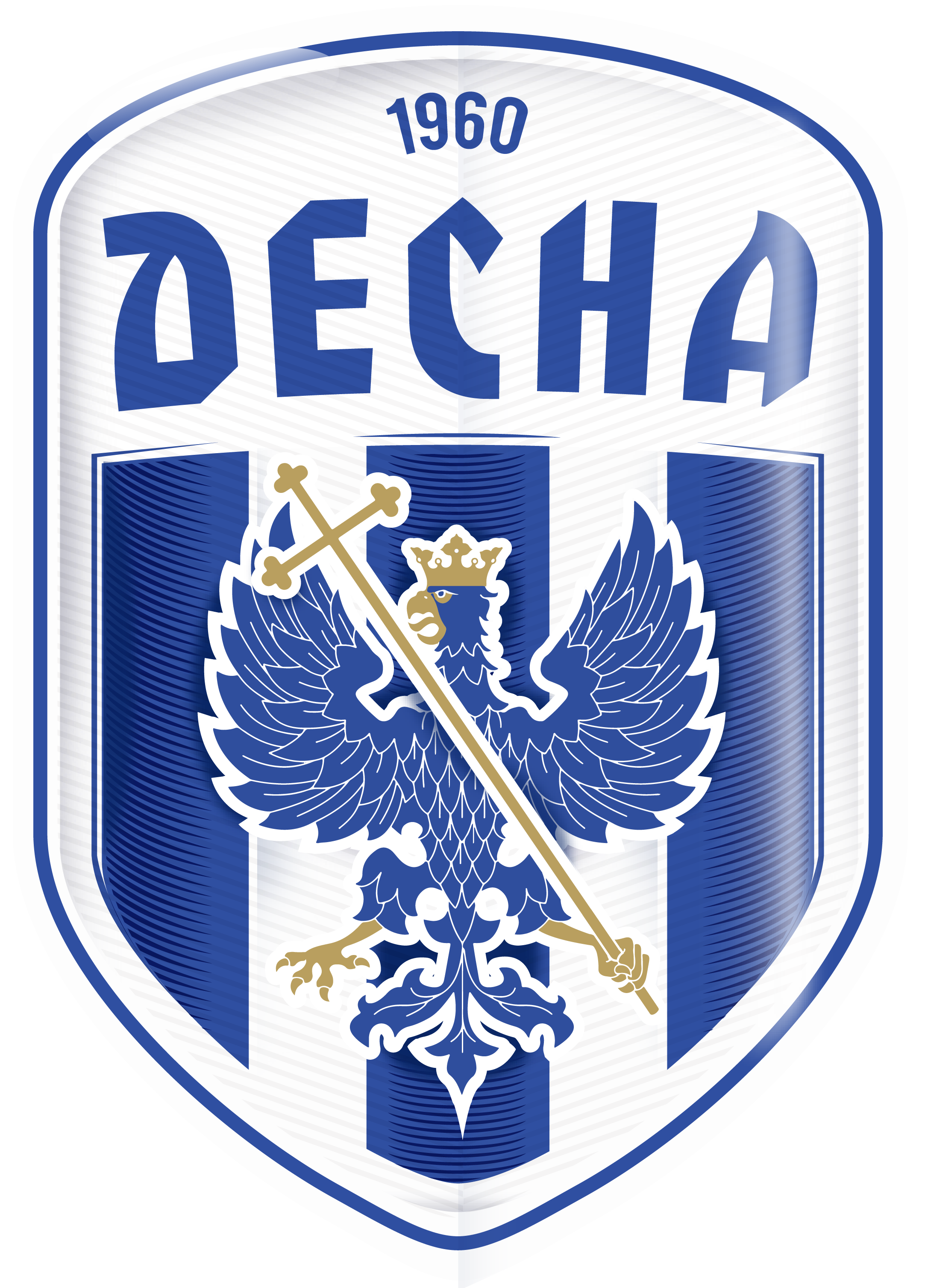
Club emblem from 2016 to the present

== Players ==
=== Current squad ===
Note: Flags indicate national team as defined under FIFA eligibility rules; some limited exceptions apply. Players may hold more than one non-FIFA nationality.

No.	Pos.	Nation	Player
—	GK	UKR	Oleksandr Khodachenko
—	GK	UKR	Yehor Kolomiyets
—	DF	UKR	Bohdan Bozhok
—	DF	UKR	Artur Havrylenko
—	DF	UKR	Dmytro Zapeka
—	MF	UKR	Oleksandr Kabushka
—	MF	UKR	Serhiy Korshun
—	MF	UKR	Nikita Posmashnyy
—	MF	UKR	Oleksandr Savchuk

No.	Pos.	Nation	Player
—	MF	UKR	Serhiy Stepanov
—	MF	UKR	Denys Kharchenko
—	MF	UKR	Vladyslav Yefymenko
—	MF	UKR	Denys Zibnytsky
—	MF	UKR	Mykola Pykhtar
—	MF	UKR	Denys Khapilin
—	MF	UKR	Stanislav Khomych
—	MF	UKR	Nazar Shevaha

== Managers ==
- 2008–2021 Serhiy Bakun
- 2021–2022 Oleksandr Zub
- 2025– Oleksandr Selivanov

== League and cup history ==
Season	Div.	Pos.	Pl.	W	D	L	GS	GA	P	Domestic Cup	Europe	Notes
2018–19	1st	10	32	8	4	20	41	81	28			
2019–20	1st	13	16	0	1	15	10	68	1			
2020–21	1st	13	26	3	5	18	21	77	14			
2021–22	1st	16	18	2	0	16	9	68	14			Membership suspended

== See also ==
- List of sport teams in Chernihiv
- FC Desna Chernihiv
- FC Desna-2 Chernihiv
- SDYuShOR Desna
- FC Chernihiv
- Yunist Chernihiv
- Lehenda Chernihiv
- Yunist ShVSM
