= Illya Shevtsov =

Ukrainian footballer

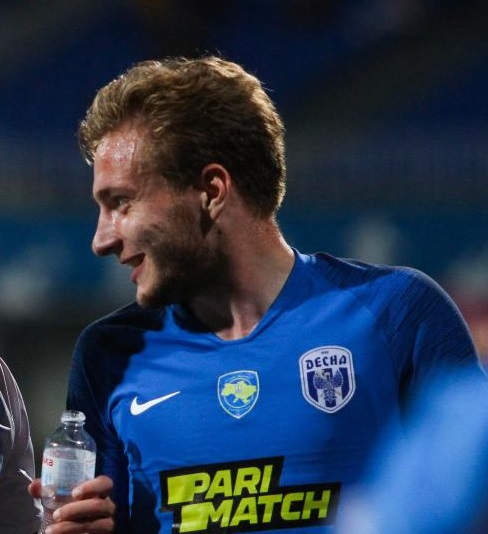

Personal information
- Full name: Illya Serhiyovych Shevtsov
- Date of birth: 13 April 2000 (age 26)
- Place of birth: Kherson, Ukraine
- Height: 1.82 m (5 ft 11 1/2 in)
- Position: Midfielder

Youth career
- 2011–2015: Krystal Kherson
- 2017: Shakhtar Donetsk

Senior career*
| Years | Team | Apps | (Gls) |
| 2015–2016 | Krystal Kherson | 36 | (4) |
| 2017–2019 | Shakhtar Donetsk | 0 | (0) |
| 2018–2019 | → Krystal Kherson (loan) | 12 | (5) |
| 2019–2022 | Desna Chernihiv | 19 | (1) |
| 2021 | → Inhulets Petrove (loan) | 8 | (2) |
| 2022 | → Charlotte Independence (loan) | 22 | (3) |
| 2024–2025 | Chornomorets Odesa | 12 | (1) |

International career^{‡}
| 2016–2017 | Ukraine U17 | 7 | (1) |
| 2020 | Ukraine U21 | 4 | (1) |
- * Club domestic league appearances and goals as of 5 August 2025 ‡ National team caps and goals as of 19 September 2020

Illya Shevtsov (Ukrainian: Ілля Сергійович Шевцов; born 13 April 2000) is a Ukrainian professional footballer who plays as a midfielder.

== Club career ==
=== Krystal Kherson ===
Shevtsov started his professional career at age 15, playing in the Ukrainian Second League for Krystal Kherson. He made his league debut for the club on 8 August 2015 as a substitute against Real Pharma Odesa.

=== Shakhtar Donetsk ===
In December 2016, he signed with Shakhtar Donetsk, where he played mainly for the under-19 team.

==== On loan to Krystal Kherson ====
In summer 20218 he moved back on loan to Krystal Kherson in Ukrainian Second League.

=== Desna 2 Chernihiv ===
In 2019, Shevtsov signed with Desna-2 Chernihiv, the reserve team of Desna Chernihiv of the Ukrainian Premier League. On 13 March 2020, he scored five goals in a match against Lviv 2, on his way to becoming the top scorer of the 2019–20 Ukrainian Under-21 Championship.

=== Desna Chernihiv ===
In summer 2020, Shevtsov was on the first team of Desna Chernihiv, for their Europa League third qualifying round match against VfL Wolfsburg, appearing in the second half as a substitute. On 24 October, he scored his first goal for Desna Chernihiv, in a 2–0 victory over Olimpik Donetsk.

==== On loan to Inhulets Petrove ====
In March 2021, he was loaned to Inhulets Petrove until the end of the 2020–21 season. He made his debut for that team on 7 March, against Kolos Kovalivka. On 3 April, he scored his first goal for Inhulets Petrove, converting a penalty kick against Mariupol.

=== Return to Desna Chernihiv ===
In summer 2021, Shevtsov returned to Desna Chernihiv. On 25 July, he made his 2021–22 season debut against Chornomorets Odesa, coming on as a substitute in the 81st minute. In 2022, following the Russian invasion of Ukraine, he terminated his contract with the club.

==== On loan to Charlotte Independence ====
In May 2022, he was loaned to Charlotte Independence in USL League One. On 5 June, he made his league debut against Greenville Triumph, replacing Grayson Barber in the 63rd minute. On 26 June, he scored his first goal for the club, in a match against Forward Madison. On 10 September 2022, he had the go-ahead score against Greenville for the 2–1 victory. In December 2022 his contract with the club was expired.

=== Chornomorets Odesa ===
On 6 September 2024, Shevtsov joined Ukrainian Premier League side Chornomorets Odesa, making his debut against Obolon Kyiv on 4 October 2024. He scored his first club and league goal in this match.

== International career ==
In 2017, Shevtsov was on the Ukraine under-17 team, helping it qualify for the 2017 UEFA European Under-17 Championship in Croatia. He played seven games and scored a goal.

He was included in the Ukraine under-21 team for the 2021 UEFA European Under-21 Championship qualification competition, which made him the first player from Desna Chernihiv to be included in a Ukraine under-21 side. On 9 October 2020, he made his debut in Ukraine under-21 against Romania, replacing Danylo Sikan in the 66th minute.

On 13 November 2020, he scored his first goal for the Ukraine under-21s in a 4–1 away victory over Malta, in a 2021 UEFA European Under-21 Championship qualifier.

== Personal life ==
He is the son of Ukrainian former footballer and coach Serhiy Shevtsov.

== Career statistics ==
=== Club ===
As of 10 May 2025

Appearances and goals by club, season and competition
| Club | Season | League | | | Cup | | Europe | | Other | | Total | |
| Club | Season | Division | Apps | Goals | Apps | Goals | Apps | Goals | Apps | Goals | Apps | Goals |
|---|---|---|---|---|---|---|---|---|---|---|---|---|
| Krystal Kherson | 2015–16 | Ukrainian Second League | 24 | 2 | 2 | 0 | 0 | 0 | 0 | 0 | 26 | 2 |
| Krystal Kherson | 2016–17 | Ukrainian Second League | 12 | 2 | 0 | 0 | 0 | 0 | 0 | 0 | 12 | 2 |
| Shakhtar Donetsk | 2017–18 | Ukrainian Premier League | 0 | 0 | 0 | 0 | 0 | 0 | 0 | 0 | 0 | 0 |
| Krystal Kherson | 2018–19 | Ukrainian Second League | 12 | 5 | 1 | 0 | 0 | 0 | 0 | 0 | 13 | 5 |
| Desna Chernihiv | 2020–21 | Ukrainian Premier League | 7 | 1 | 1 | 0 | 1 (Note: Appearance in UEFA Europa League) | 0 | 0 | 0 | 9 | 1 |
| Desna Chernihiv | 2021–22 | Ukrainian Premier League | 12 | 0 | 0 | 0 | 0 | 0 | 0 | 0 | 12 | 0 |
| Inhulets Petrove (loan) | 2020–21 | Ukrainian Premier League | 8 | 2 | 0 | 0 | 0 | 0 | 0 | 0 | 8 | 2 |
| Charlotte Independence (loan) | 2022 | USL League One | 22 | 3 | 0 | 0 | 0 | 0 | 0 | 0 | 22 | 3 |
| Chornomorets Odesa | 2024–25 | Ukrainian Premier League | 12 | 1 | 0 | 0 | 0 | 0 | 0 | 0 | 12 | 1 |
| Career total | | | 108 | 16 | 4 | 0 | 1 | 0 | 0 | 0 | 111 | 16 |

== Honours ==
Individual

- Top Scorer of Ukrainian Premier League Reserves: 2019–20 (13 goals)

== Gallery ==
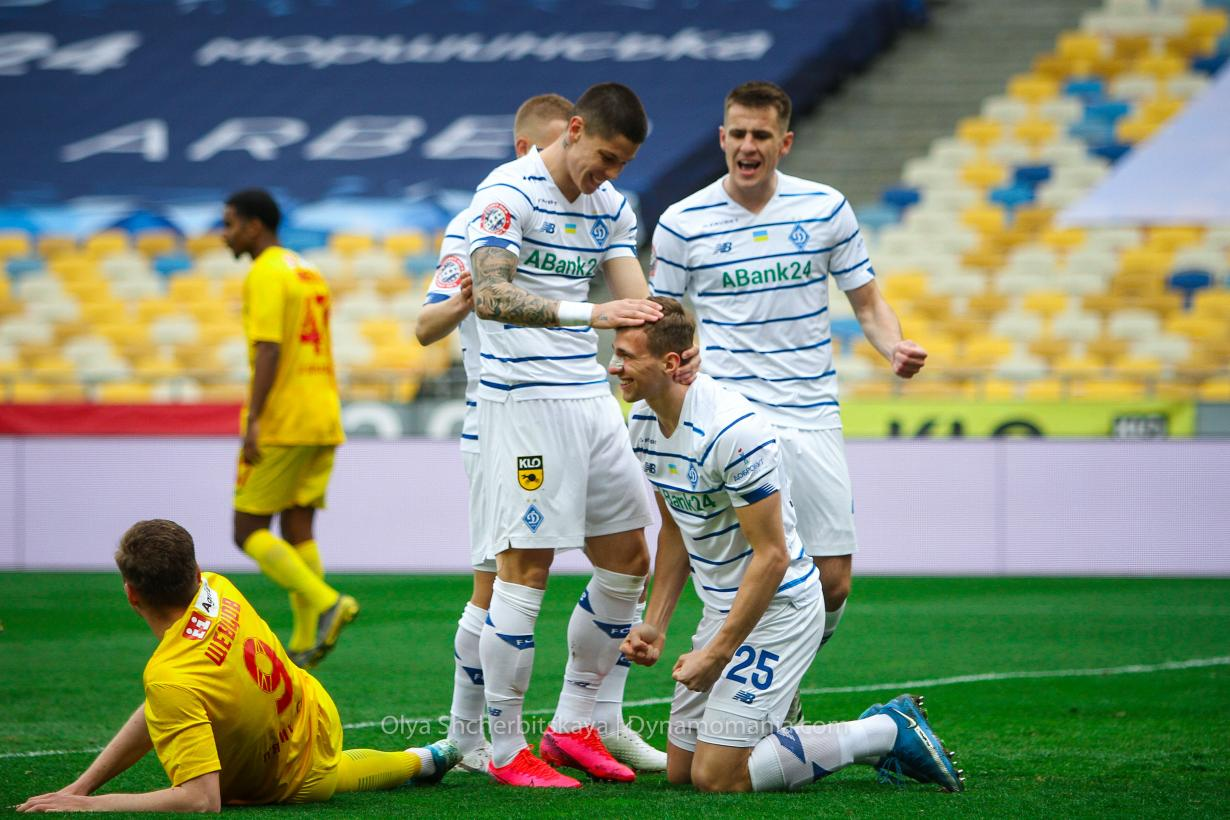
Shevtsov playing for Inhulets Petrove
