= Oleksandr Zub =

Ukrainian footballer and coach (born 1977)

Personal information
- Full name: Зуб Олександр Сергійович
- Date of birth: 3 May 1977 (age 49)
- Place of birth: Chernihiv, Ukrainian SSR, Soviet Union
- Date of death: 23 April 2025
- Height: 1.85 m (6 ft 1 in)
- Position: Defender

Youth career
- 1985-1994: SDYuShOR Desna

Senior career*
Years	Team	Apps	(Gls)
1997	Spartak Yerevan	1	(0)
2001	Europa Pryluky,	17	(1)
2002	Fakel-GPZ Varva	2	(0)

Managerial career
- 2003: SDYuShOR Desna
- 2005: SDYuShOR Desna
- 2021–2022: Desna-3 Chernihiv
- * Club domestic league appearances and goals

Oleksandr Zub (Ukrainian: Зуб Олександр Сергійович; born Chernihiv 3 May 1977) is a retired Ukrainian footballer and current head coach of FC Desna-3 Chernihiv.

== Career ==
=== Footballer ===
As a player, Zub was a product of SDYuShOR Desna. In childhood, due to family circumstances, he moved to Armenia for a while. From the age of 18, he served for 2 years (from 1995 to 1997) in the army. Since he was not accepted into the Armenian military unit due to his lack of knowledge of the language, he served in the Russian reconnaissance company of the Special Forces, which was stationed in Yerevan. In 1997, he played for Spartak Yerevan, with which he took 5th place in the championship of Armenia. From 2001 to 2014, he played for the Ukrainian amateur teams Europa Pryluky, Fakel-GPZ Varva, Polyssya Dobryanka, Avanhard Koryukivka, Kholodny Yar, Budivel-Energia Ripky, Zernoprom Anisiv

=== Coach ===
After the end of his playing career, he was appointed as coach of SDYuShOR Desna in 2003 and 2005. In 2021 he was appointed as coach Desna-3 Chernihiv, the under-19 team of the Desna Chernihiv

== Outside of professional football ==
On March 3, 2022, during the Siege of Chernihiv, during the 2022 Russian invasion of Ukraine, he began serving in the Chernihiv Municipal Guard.
