= 2018–19 Ukrainian Premier League Under-21 and Under-19 =

Ukrainian Premier League Reserves
- Season: 2018–19
- Top goalscorer: 14 – Andriy Kulakov (Shakhtar)

The 2018–19 Ukrainian Premier League Reserves and Under 19 season were competitions between the reserves of Ukrainian Premier League Clubs and the Under 19s.

== Teams ==
| Entering | Replaced |
|---|---|
| FC Lviv; Arsenal–Kyiv (U21); Desna Chernihiv (U21) Volyn Lutsk (U19); Metalurh Zaporizhia (U19) | Veres Rivne; Stal Kamianske; Zirka Kropyvnytskyi Skala Stryi (U19) |

== Under 21 competition ==
=== Standings ===
| Pos | Team | Pld | W | D | L | GF | GA | GD | Pts |
|---|---|---|---|---|---|---|---|---|---|
| 1 | Dynamo Kyiv reserves | 32 | 25 | 4 | 3 | 91 | 23 | +68 | 79 |
| 2 | Oleksandriya reserves | 32 | 21 | 6 | 5 | 55 | 25 | +30 | 69 |
| 3 | Shakhtar Donetsk reserves | 32 | 16 | 8 | 8 | 63 | 36 | +27 | 56 |
| 4 | Zorya Luhansk reserves | 32 | 14 | 3 | 15 | 64 | 68 | −4 | 45 |
| 5 | Vorskla Poltava reserves | 32 | 13 | 3 | 16 | 53 | 45 | +8 | 42 |
| 6 | Arsenal–Kyiv reserves | 32 | 11 | 4 | 17 | 49 | 77 | −28 | 37 |
| 7 | Mariupol reserves | 32 | 16 | 5 | 11 | 54 | 56 | −2 | 53 |
| 8 | Chornomorets Odesa reserves | 32 | 15 | 7 | 10 | 43 | 39 | +4 | 52 |
| 9 | Karpaty Lviv reserves | 32 | 13 | 6 | 13 | 50 | 55 | −5 | 45 |
| 10 | Desna Chernihiv reserves | 32 | 8 | 4 | 20 | 41 | 81 | −40 | 28 |
| 11 | Lviv reserves | 32 | 7 | 3 | 22 | 35 | 80 | −45 | 24 |
| 12 | Olimpik Donetsk reserves | 32 | 5 | 3 | 24 | 23 | 36 | −13 | 18 |

Source: Ukrainian Premier League website (in Ukrainian)
Rules for classification: 1) points; 2) goal difference; 3) number of goals scored. Relegation is dependent on senior club

=== Top scorers ===
| Scorer | Goals (Pen.) | Team |
|---|---|---|
| (Ukraine) Andriy Kulakov | 14 (1) | Shakhtar Donetsk Reserves |
| (Ukraine) Roman Vovk | 13 (2) | Desna Chernihiv reserves |
| (Ukraine) Yuriy Shpyrka | 11 | Dynamo Kyiv Reserves |
| (Ukraine) Oleksandr Hlahola | 11 (2) | Shakhtar Donetsk Reserves |
| (Ukraine) Rostyslav Lyakh | 10 (2) | Karpaty Lviv Reserves |
| (Ukraine) Vladyslav Borysenko | 10 (2) | Zorya Luhansk Reserves |
| (Ukraine) Danyil Sukhoruchko | 9 | Arsenal–Kyiv Reserves |
| (Ukraine) Yuriy Kozyrenko | 9 | Vorskla Poltava Reserves |
| (Ukraine) Ihor Zahoruyko | 9 | Zorya Luhansk Reserves |
| (Ukraine) Orest Tkachuk | 9 (2) | Oleksandriya Reserves |
| (Ukraine) Vladyslav Buhay | 9 (2) | Mariupol Reserves |

== Under 19 competition ==
| Pos | Team | Pld | W | D | L | GF | GA | GD | Pts |
|---|---|---|---|---|---|---|---|---|---|
| 1 | Dynamo Kyiv reserves | 26 | 23 | 2 | 1 | 83 | 22 | +61 | 71 |
| 2 | Shakhtar Donetsk reserves | 26 | 22 | 4 | 0 | 69 | 8 | +61 | 70 |
| 3 | Karpaty Lviv reserves | 26 | 14 | 5 | 7 | 54 | 39 | +15 | 47 |
| 4 | Volyn Lutsk reserves | 26 | 14 | 1 | 11 | 50 | 36 | +14 | 43 |
| 5 | Mariupol reserves | 26 | 12 | 6 | 8 | 40 | 32 | +8 | 42 |
| 6 | Zorya Luhansk reserves | 26 | 11 | 6 | 9 | 32 | 25 | +7 | 39 |
| 7 | Vorskla Poltava reserves | 26 | 12 | 3 | 11 | 39 | 34 | +5 | 39 |
| 8 | Arsenal–Kyiv reserves | 26 | 12 | 2 | 12 | 51 | 62 | −11 | 38 |
| 9 | Oleksandriya reserves | 26 | 10 | 6 | 10 | 42 | 30 | +12 | 36 |
| 10 | Lviv reserves | 26 | 9 | 4 | 13 | 30 | 50 | −20 | 31 |
| 11 | Metalurh Zaporizhia reserves | 26 | 9 | 3 | 14 | 55 | 61 | −6 | 30 |
| 12 | Chornomorets Odesa reserves | 26 | 8 | 4 | 14 | 23 | 42 | −19 | 28 |
| 13 | Olimpik Donetsk reserves | 26 | 1 | 2 | 23 | 12 | 31 | −19 | 5 |
| 14 | Desna Chernihiv reserves | 26 | 1 | 0 | 25 | 16 | 124 | −108 | 3 |

Source: Ukrainian Premier League website (in Ukrainian)
Rules for classification: 1) points; 2) goal difference; 3) number of goals scored. Relegation is dependent on senior club

=== Top scorers ===
| Scorer | Goals (Pen.) | Team |
|---|---|---|
| (Ukraine) Artem Bondarenko | 20 (5) | Shakhtar Donetsk Reserves |
| (Ukraine) Vasyl Runich | 18 (5) | Karpaty Lviv Reserves |
| (Ukraine) Yevhen Isayenko | 17 (3) | Dynamo Kyiv Reserves |
| (Ukraine) Petro Lutsiv | 16 (7) | Oleksandriya Reserves |
| (Ukraine) Oleksiy Sydorov | 15 | Metalurh Zaporizhia Reserves |

== See also ==
- 2018–19 Ukrainian Premier League
