= 2019–20 Ukrainian Premier League Under-21 and Under-19 =

Ukrainian Premier League Under-21 and Under-19
- Season: 2019–20
- Champions: None
- Top goalscorer: 13 – Illia Shevtsov (Desna)

The 2019–20 Ukrainian Premier League Under-21 and Under-19 season were competitions between the youth teams of the Ukrainian Premier League. The season was abandoned in March due to the COVID-19 pandemic worldwide.

Before the season Dynamo Kyiv was a defending champion in both competition categories (U–21 and U–19 teams). Shakhtar Donetsk was in the lead in competitions among "under-21" teams, while Dynamo Kyiv ended up at top of competition table among "under-19" teams. No titles were officially given out and all youth competitions were declared incomplete.

== Teams ==
Entering	Replaced
SC Dnipro-1; Kolos Kovalivka	Arsenal–Kyiv; Chornomorets Odesa; Olimpik Donetsk

== Under-21 competition ==
=== Standings ===
Pos	Team	Pld	W	D	L	GF	GA	GD	Pts
1	FC Shakhtar Donetsk U-21	21	17	2	2	46	16	+30	53
2	FC Dynamo Kyiv U-21	21	15	4	2	56	27	+29	49
3	FC Vorskla Poltava U-21	21	12	5	4	48	30	+18	41
4	FC Oleksandriya U-21	21	11	3	7	39	25	+14	36
5	FC Zorya Luhansk U-21	21	9	2	10	37	32	+5	29
6	FC Karpaty Lviv U-21	21	7	5	9	36	38	−2	26
7	FC Lviv U-21	21	8	2	11	32	45	−13	26
8	FC Mariupol U-21	21	7	3	11	30	42	−12	24
9	FC Desna Chernihiv U-21	21	5	3	13	28	44	−16	18
10	FC Kolos Kovalivka U-21	20	3	3	14	17	39	−22	12
11	SC Dnipro-1 U-21	21	2	6	13	20	51	−31	12

Source: Ukrainian Premier League website
Rules for classification: 1) points; 2) goal difference; 3) number of goals scored. Relegation is dependent on senior club

=== Top scorers ===
Scorer	Goals (Pen.)	Team
(Ukraine) Illia Shevtsov	13 (2)	Desna Chernihiv U-21
(Ukraine) Artem Bilyi	11 (5)	Vorskla Poltava U-21
(Ukraine) Stanislav Sorokin	9 (2)	Kolos Kovalivka U-21
(Ukraine) Yevhen Isayenko	8 (2)	Dynamo Kyiv U-21
(Ukraine) Denis Yanakov	8 (3)	Dynamo Kyiv U-21

Source: Ukrainian Premier League website

== Under-19 competition ==
Pos	Team	Pld	W	D	L	GF	GA	GD	Pts
1	FC Dynamo Kyiv U-19	16	14	1	1	56	8	+48	43
2	FC Shakhtar Donetsk U-19	15	14	0	1	49	10	+39	42
3	FC Vorskla Poltava U-19	16	11	3	2	37	11	+26	36
4	FC Volyn Lutsk U-19	16	11	1	4	37	28	+9	34
5	FC Oleksandriya U-19	16	8	5	3	30	20	+10	29
6	FC Karpaty Lviv U-19	15	9	1	5	35	17	+18	28
7	FC Metalurh Zaporizhia U-19	16	5	2	9	23	33	−10	17
8	FC Lviv U-19	15	5	2	8	21	34	−13	17
9	FC Zorya Luhansk U-19	16	4	3	9	20	25	−5	15
10	FC Mariupol U-19	16	2	5	9	19	33	−14	11
11	FC Kolos Kovalivka U-19	15	3	1	11	19	41	−22	10
12	SC Dnipro-1 U-19	16	2	3	11	15	43	−28	9
13	FC Desna Chernihiv U-19	16	0	1	15	10	68	−58	1

Source: Ukrainian Premier League website
Rules for classification: 1) points; 2) goal difference; 3) number of goals scored. Relegation is dependent on senior club

=== Top scorers ===
Scorer	Goals (Pen.)	Team
(Ukraine) Abdulla Abdullayev	21 (5)	Shakhtar Donetsk U-19
(Ukraine) Vladyslav Vanat	19 (4)	Dynamo Kyiv U-19
(Ukraine) Danylo Kravchuk	14 (2)	Vorskla Poltava U-19

Source: Ukrainian Premier League website

== See also ==
- 2019–20 Ukrainian Premier League
