= 2021–22 Ukrainian Premier League Under-19 =

Ukrainian Premier League Under-19
- Season: 2021–22

The 2021–22 Ukrainian Premier League Under-19 season were competitions between the youth teams of the Ukrainian Premier League.

== Teams ==
Entering	Replaced
Veres Rivne; Chornomorets Odesa; Metalist 1925 Kharkiv	Olimpik Donetsk

== League table ==
Pos	Team	Pld	W	D	L	GF	GA	GD	Pts	Qualification or relegation
1	Rukh Lviv	18	15	2	1	49	11	+38	47	Qualification to Domestic Champions path
2	Dynamo Kyiv	19	15	1	3	72	17	+55	46	
3	Shakhtar Donetsk	18	14	1	3	46	13	+33	43	Qualification to UEFA Champions League Path
4	Metalist 1925 Kharkiv	18	13	2	3	32	14	+18	41	
5	Zorya Luhansk	18	10	4	4	57	23	+34	34	
6	Vorskla Poltava	18	10	2	6	32	23	+9	32	
7	Dnipro-1	17	9	2	6	33	27	+6	29	
8	Oleksandriya	18	8	3	7	21	29	−8	27	
9	Kolos Kovalivka	19	7	1	11	24	32	−8	22 (Note: Head-to-head goal difference: Kolos –8; Chornomorets –13)	
10	Chornomorets Odesa	18	6	4	8	18	31	−13	22	
11	Mariupol (Note: Desna Chernihiv and Mariupol confirmed that they cannot compete next season due to destroyed infrastructure and the difficult situation in their cities concern of 2022 Russian invasion of Ukraine.)	18	7	0	11	25	31	−6	21	Membership suspended
12	Lviv	18	5	2	11	12	31	−19	17	
13	Inhulets Petrove	19	4	2	13	20	42	−22	14	
14	Mynai	18	3	3	12	17	39	−22	12	
15	Veres Rivne	18	2	1	15	9	45	−36	7	
16	Desna Chernihiv	18	2	0	16	9	68	−59	6	Membership suspended

Source: Ukrainian Premier League website
Rules for classification: 1) Points; 2) Head-to-head points; 3) Head-to-head goal difference; 4) Head-to-head higher number of goals scored; 5) Goal difference; 6) higher number of goals scored; 7) Draw or "Golden match" if two teams tied for title (Article 22, paragraph 3).

=== Top scorers ===
Scorer	Team	Goals (Pen.)
(Ukraine) Daniel Kivinda	Dnipro-1	14
(Senegal) Samba Diallo	Dynamo Kyiv	13
(Brazil) Guilherme Smith	Zorya Luhansk	13 (1)
(Ukraine) Danylo Honcharuk	Shakhtar Donetsk	11 (2)
(Ukraine) Denys Nahnoynyi	Zorya Luhansk	10 (1)
(Ukraine) Yaroslav Karabin	Rukh Lviv	10 (3)

Source: Ukrainian Premier League website

== See also ==
- 2021–22 Ukrainian Premier League
