= 2016–17 Ukrainian First League =

Ukrainian First League
- Season: 2016–17
- Champions: Illichivets Mariupol
- Promoted: Illichivets Mariupol; ~~Desna Chernihiv~~; Veres Rivne
- Relegated: Bukovyna Chernivtsi; Skala Stryi; FC Ternopil
- Matches: 305
- Goals: 691 (2.27 per match)
- Top goalscorer: 24 goals – Ruslan Stepanyuk (Veres)
- Biggest home win: 6 – Mykolaiv 7–1 FC Ternopil (Round 32)
- Biggest away win: 5 – Hirnyk-Sport 1–6 Veres (Round 8)
- Highest scoring: 9 – Arsenal Kyiv 5–4 Skala (Round 32)
- Longest winning run: 8 – Illichivets (Round 1–8)
- Longest unbeaten run: 12 – Illichivets (Round 1–12)
- Longest winless run: 19 – Skala (Round 14–32)
- Longest losing run: 12 – Skala (Round 21–32)
- Highest attendance: 5,200 – Veres–Desna (Round 23)
- Lowest attendance: 0 (Note: Match played without spectators due to sanctions (see results section)) – Veres–Hirnyk-Sport (Round 25)
- All statistics correct as of 3 June 2017.

The 2016–17 Ukrainian First League was the 26th since its establishment. The fixtures were announced on 16 July 2016, and the competition commenced on 24 July 2016. The spring session started on 12 March 2017 with the competition ending on 2 June 2017.

== Teams ==
=== Promoted teams ===
Originally, as per competition regulations the top three teams were promoted from the 2015–16 Ukrainian Second League. However, prior to the season commencing at the Conference of the PFL in preparation for the season the committee decided to expand the competition to eighteen teams and include the fourth, fifth and sixth placed teams. Six teams promotion beat the previous record of five teams that was set back in 2002 (14 years ago).

- Kolos Kovalivka – champion of the 2015–16 Ukrainian Second League (debut)
- Veres Rivne – runner-up (returning for the first time since 1996–97 season, 19 seasons absence)
- Inhulets Petrove – 3rd placed (debut)
- Bukovyna Chernivtsi – 4th placed (returning after one season)
- Skala Stryi – 5th placed (debut, however a club from Stryi namely FC Hazovyk-Skala Stryi competed in the 2005–06 season)
- Arsenal Kyiv – 6th placed (debut, however a predecessor of Arsenal Kyiv, CSKA-Borysfen Kyiv, competed in the 1994–95 season)

=== Relegated teams ===
No teams were relegated from the Ukrainian Premier League

=== Withdrawn teams ===
Two teams were withdrawn before the season:

- Dynamo-2 Kyiv
- Hirnyk Kryvyi Rih

=== Location map ===
The following displays the location of teams.

Home venues of teams in the 2016–17 Ukrainian First League.

== Stadiums ==
The following stadiums are considered home grounds for the teams in the competition.

| Rank | Stadium | Capacity | Club | Notes |
|---|---|---|---|---|
| 1 | Yuvileiny Stadium, Sumy | 25,800 | PFC Sumy | |
| 2 | Vorskla Stadium, Poltava | 24,795 | FC Poltava | Used in Round 28 (Note: FC Poltava moved their home match in Round 28 to Vorskla Stadium due to the reseeding of the pitch at Lokomotyv Stadium.) |
| 3 | Central City Stadium, Mykolaiv | 16,700 | MFC Mykolaiv | |
| 4 | City Stadium, Ternopil | 12,750 | FC Ternopil | |
| 5 | Illichivets Stadium, Mariupol | 12,680 | Illichivets Mariupol | |
| 6 | Chernihiv Stadium, Chernihiv (Note: Due to reconstruction of the pitch at Chernihiv Stadium before the start of the season, Desna Chernihiv moved their home fixtures to different arenas.) | 12,060 | Desna Chernihiv | |
| 7 | Bukovyna Stadium, Chernivtsi | 12,000 | Bukovyna Chernivtsi | |
| 8 | Central Stadion, Cherkasy | 10,321 | Cherkaskyi Dnipro | |
| 9 | Sokil Stadium, Stryi | 6,000 | Skala Stryi | |
| 10 | Kolos Stadium, Boryspil | 5,654 | Arsenal Kyiv | |
| 11 | Naftovyk Stadium, Okhtyrka | 5,256 | Naftovyk-Ukrnafta Okhtyrka | |
| 12 | Obolon Arena, Kyiv | 5,100 | Obolon-Brovar Kyiv | |
| 12 | Obolon Arena, Kyiv | 5,100 | Desna Chernihiv | Used in Round 2, 11 and Spring session. |
| 13 | Sonyachny Stadium, Kharkiv | 4,924 | Helios Kharkiv | |
| 13 | Sonyachny Stadium, Kharkiv | 4,924 | Desna Chernihiv | Used in Round 4, 6 and 8 |
| 14 | Avanhard Stadium, Rivne | 4,500 | Veres Rivne | |
| 15 | Avanhard Stadium, Kramatorsk | 4,000 | Avanhard Kramatorsk | |
| 16 | Kolos Stadium, Berezne | 3,800 | Veres Rivne | Used in Round 19 |
| 17 | Izotop Stadium, Varash | 3,000 | Veres Rivne | Used in the Spring session (Note: Due to the pitch at Avanhard Stadium not being ready after the winter break, Veres Rivne moved their rescheduled Round 15 match and Round 21 home fixtures to Izotop Stadium.) |
| 18 | Lokomotyv Stadium, Poltava | 2,500 | FC Poltava | |
| 18 | Yunist Stadium, Horishni Plavni | 2,500 | Hirnyk-Sport Horishni Plavni | |
| 20 | Kolos Stadium, Kovalivka | 1,850 | Kolos Kovalivka | |
| 21 | Inhulets Stadium, Petrove | 1,720 | Inhulets Petrove | |
| 22 | Knyazha Arena, Shchaslyve | 1,000 | Arsenal Kyiv | |
| 23 | Ltava Stadium, Poltava | 640 | FC Poltava | Used in Round 30 |
| 24 | FC Viktorya Stadium, Mykolayivka, Bilopillia Raion, Sumy Oblast | 500 | FC Sumy | Used in Round 6 |
| 24 | Poltava Training Base Stadium, Kopyly, Poltava Raion, Poltava Oblast | 500 | FC Sumy | Used in Round 20 |

== Managers ==
| Club | Head coach | Replaced coach |
|---|---|---|
| Arsenal Kyiv | (Ukraine) Serhiy Litovchenko | |
| Avanhard Kramatorsk | (Ukraine) Oleksandr Kosevych | (Ukraine) Yakiv Kripak |
| Bukovyna Chernivtsi | (Ukraine) Oleh Ratiy | (Ukraine) Serhiy Shyshchenko |
| Cherkaskyi Dnipro | (Ukraine) Vadym Yevtushenko | (Ukraine) Ihor Stolovytskyi (Ukraine) Oleksandr Kyrylyuk (Kyrgyzstan) Vitaliy Kobzar (caretaker) |
| Desna Chernihiv | (Ukraine) Oleksandr Ryabokon | |
| Helios Kharkiv | (Ukraine) Serhiy Syzykhin | |
| Hirnyk-Sport Horishni Plavni | (Ukraine) Serhiy Puchkov | (Ukraine) Ihor Zhabchenko |
| Illichivets Mariupol | (Ukraine) Oleksandr Sevidov | |
| Inhulets Petrove | (Ukraine) Serhiy Lavrynenko | (Ukraine) Eduard Khavrov |
| Kolos Kovalivka | (Ukraine) Ruslan Kostyshyn | |
| MFC Mykolaiv | (Ukraine) Ruslan Zabranskyi | |
| Naftovyk-Ukrnafta Okhtyrka | (Ukraine) Volodymyr Knysh | |
| Obolon-Brovar Kyiv | (Ukraine) Oleh Mazurenko | (Russia) Sergei Soldatov |
| FC Poltava | (Ukraine) Volodymyr Prokopynenko | (Ukraine) Anatoliy Bezsmertnyi (Turkmenistan) Andrei Zavyalov (caretaker) (Ukraine) Yuriy Yaroshenko |
| Skala Stryi | (Ukraine) Roman Hnativ | (Ukraine) Vasyl Malyk |
| PFC Sumy | (Ukraine) Anatoliy Bezsmertnyi | (Ukraine) Yuriy Yaroshenko (Ukraine) Pavlo Kikot (caretaker) (Ukraine) Volodymyr Lyutyi |
| FC Ternopil | (Kazakhstan) Petr Badlo | (Ukraine) Ivan Marushchak (Ukraine) Vasyl Matviykiv (caretaker) |
| Veres Rivne | (Ukraine) Yuriy Virt (caretaker) | (Ukraine) Volodymyr Mazyar |

=== Managerial changes ===
| Team | Outgoing head coach | Manner of departure | Date of vacancy | Table | Incoming head coach | Date of appointment |
|---|---|---|---|---|---|---|
| Bukovyna Chernivtsi | (Ukraine) Viktor Mhlynets | Resigns | 29 May 2016 | Pre-season | (Ukraine) Serhiy Shyshchenko | 29 June 2016 |
| FC Ternopil | (Ukraine) Vasyl Ivehesh | Work with the youth teams | 30 June 2016 | Pre-season | (Ukraine) Ivan Marushchak | 1 July 2016 |
| Inhulets Petrove | (Ukraine) Eduard Khavrov | Sacked (Note: Eduard Khavrov continued to perform managerial duties and the club announced that he will be in that position until a replacement was found.) | 21 August 2016 | 16th | (Ukraine) Serhiy Lavrynenko | 31 August 2016 |
| FC Poltava | (Ukraine) Anatoliy Bezsmertnyi | Sacked | 5 September 2016 | 13th | (Turkmenistan) Andrei Zavyalov (caretaker) | 5 September 2016 |
| Avanhard Kramatorsk | (Ukraine) Yakiv Kripak | Resigned | 9 September 2016 | 15th | (Ukraine) Oleksandr Kosevych | 9 September 2016 |
| PFC Sumy | (Ukraine) Yuriy Yaroshenko | Sacked | 16 September 2016 | 14th | (Ukraine) Pavlo Kikot | 16 September 2016 |
| FC Ternopil | (Ukraine) Ivan Marushchak | Sacked | 16 September 2016 | 18th | (Ukraine) Vasyl Matviykiv (caretaker) (Note: On 12 January 2017 Mykola Krut, a curator of FC Ternopil, announced that an agreement was reached with Roman Maksymyuk for the position of head coach for the senior team and Maksymyuk has submitted documents to be selected. However, less than a week later on 18 January 2017 it was announced that the club and Maksymyuk did not reach agreement in regards to the coaching approach and the senior team of the club will continue to be coached by Matviykiv.) | 16 September 2016 |
| FC Poltava | (Turkmenistan) Andrei Zavyalov (caretaker) | End of interim spell | 21 September 2016 | 11th | (Ukraine) Yuriy Yaroshenko | 21 September 2016 |
| Cherkaskyi Dnipro | (Ukraine) Ihor Stolovytskyi | Sacked | 23 September 2016 | 6th | (Ukraine) Oleksandr Kyrylyuk | 23 September 2016 |
| Obolon-Brovar Kyiv | (Russia) Sergei Soldatov | Resigned | 24 October 2016 | 10th | (Ukraine) Oleh Mazurenko | 24 October 2016 |
| Cherkaskyi Dnipro | (Ukraine) Oleksandr Kyrylyuk | Sacked | 10 November 2016 | 7th | (Kyrgyzstan) Vitaliy Kobzar (caretaker) | 10 November 2016 |
| Cherkaskyi Dnipro | (Kyrgyzstan) Vitaliy Kobzar (caretaker) | End of interim duty | 26 November 2016 | 7th | (Ukraine) Vadym Yevtushenko | 26 November 2016 |
| Hirnyk-Sport Horishni Plavni | (Ukraine) Ihor Zhabchenko | End of contract | 20 December 2016 | 15th | (Ukraine) Serhiy Puchkov | 21 December 2016 |
| Bukovyna Chernivtsi | (Ukraine) Serhiy Shyshchenko | Resigns | 28 December 2016 | 14th | (Ukraine) Oleh Ratiy | 5 February 2017 |
| FC Skala Stryi | (Ukraine) Vasyl Malyk | Contract terminated | 27 January 2017 | 17th | (Ukraine) Roman Hnativ | 27 January 2017 |
| PFC Sumy | (Ukraine) Pavlo Kikot | end of interim duty | 25 January 2017 | 16th | (Ukraine) Volodymyr Lyutyi | 25 January 2017 |
| PFC Sumy | (Ukraine) Volodymyr Lyutyi | Resigns (Note: During the winter break PFC Sumy seeking extra funding signed a contract with a Chinese investor and was hired as a head coach Volodymyr Lyutyi. However, the investment never eventuated as the investor failed to complete the transaction. The club was on a verge of bankruptcy and the coaching staff was released. Financial support for the club was provided by an amateur club Ahrobiznes-TSK Romny, and the president hired Anatoliy Bezsmertnyi for Sumy.) | 4 March 2017 | 16th | (Ukraine) Anatoliy Bezsmertnyi | 4 March 2017 |
| Veres Rivne | (Ukraine) Volodymyr Mazyar | Family circumstances breach of contract (fired) | 25 April 2017 16 June 2017 | 3rd | (Ukraine) Yuriy Virt (caretaker) | 25 April 2017 |
| FC Ternopil | (Ukraine) Vasyl Matviykiv (caretaker) | Interim | 1 May 2017 | 18th | (Kazakhstan) Petr Badlo | 1 May 2017 |
| FC Poltava | (Ukraine) Yuriy Yaroshenko | Sacked | 5 May 2017 | 11th | (Ukraine) Volodymyr Prokopynenko | 5 May 2017 |

== League table ==
| Pos | Team | Pld | W | D | L | GF | GA | GD | Pts | Promotion, qualification or relegation |
|---|---|---|---|---|---|---|---|---|---|---|
| 1 | Illichivets Mariupol (C, P) | 34 | 25 | 6 | 3 | 61 | 21 | +40 | 81 | Promotion to Ukrainian Premier League |
| 2 | Desna Chernihiv (Note: The Ukrainian Premier League did not grant Desna Chernihiv a licence to participate in the league, indicating that the club is not able to guarantee for an adequate financing of their infrastructure.) | 34 | 22 | 8 | 4 | 55 | 23 | +32 | 74 | |
| 3 | Veres Rivne (P) | 34 | 20 | 7 | 7 | 62 | 32 | +30 | 67 | Promotion to Ukrainian Premier League |
| 4 | Helios Kharkiv | 34 | 16 | 10 | 8 | 31 | 22 | +9 | 58 | |
| 5 | Kolos Kovalivka | 34 | 16 | 9 | 9 | 52 | 38 | +14 | 57 | |
| 6 | Naftovyk-Ukrnafta Okhtyrka | 34 | 15 | 9 | 10 | 47 | 29 | +18 | 54 | |
| 7 | Avanhard Kramatorsk | 34 | 14 | 10 | 10 | 32 | 28 | +4 | 52 | |
| 8 | Cherkaskyi Dnipro | 34 | 12 | 12 | 10 | 30 | 29 | +1 | 48 | |
| 9 | Obolon-Brovar Kyiv | 34 | 12 | 9 | 13 | 37 | 37 | 0 | 45 | |
| 10 | Arsenal Kyiv | 34 | 12 | 9 | 13 | 38 | 39 | −1 | 45 | |
| 11 | Hirnyk-Sport Horishni Plavni | 34 | 12 | 7 | 15 | 47 | 54 | −7 | 43 | |
| 12 | FC Poltava (Note: On 12 January 2017, FC Poltava were deducted a total of 3 points in accordance with the FFU Control and Disciplinary Committee.) | 34 | 13 | 4 | 17 | 33 | 43 | −10 | 40 | |
| 13 | Inhulets Petrove | 34 | 10 | 8 | 16 | 33 | 45 | −12 | 38 | |
| 14 | MFC Mykolaiv | 34 | 11 | 4 | 19 | 35 | 44 | −9 | 37 | |
| 15 | PFC Sumy (O) | 34 | 8 | 12 | 14 | 34 | 44 | −10 | 36 | Qualification to relegation play-offs |
| 16 | Bukovyna Chernivtsi (R) | 34 | 8 | 9 | 17 | 27 | 40 | −13 | 33 | Relegation to Ukrainian Second League |
| 17 | Skala Stryi (R) | 34 | 5 | 5 | 24 | 25 | 58 | −33 | 20 | Relegation to Ukrainian Second League |
| 18 | FC Ternopil (R) | 34 | 3 | 6 | 25 | 17 | 70 | −53 | 15 | Relegation to Ukrainian Second League |

Source: PFL.ua
Rules for classification: 1) Points; 2) Goal difference; 3) Goals scored; 4) Head-to-head points; 5) Head-to-head goal difference; 6) Head-to-head away goals scored; 7) Draw or "golden match" (if tied for first).
(C) Champions; (O) Play-off winners; (P) Promoted; (R) Relegated

=== Results ===
| Home \ Away | ARK | AVK | BUC | CHD | DES | HEL | HIS | ILL | IHP | KOK | MYK | NAF | OBK | POL | SKS | SUM | TNP | VER |
|---|---|---|---|---|---|---|---|---|---|---|---|---|---|---|---|---|---|---|
| Arsenal Kyiv | | 0–3 | 0–1 | 0–0 | 1–2 | 1–0 | 2–0 | 0–3 | 3–0 | 3–3 | 1–0 | 2–1 | 2–1 | 0–1 | 5–4 | 1–1 | 4–0 | 0–0 |
| Avanhard Kramatorsk | 0–2 | | 1–1 | 0–1 | 0–2 | 1–1 | 0–1 | 2–1 | 1–1 | 0–1 | 2–0 | 1–0 | 3–1 | 1–0 | 2–0 | 0–2 | 2–0 | 1–0 |
| Bukovyna Chernivtsi | 0–2 | 0–0 | | 0–0 | 0–1 | 1–1 | 2–0 | 0–2 | 0–1 | 2–3 | 2–0 | 2–2 | 0–0 | 0–2 | 1–0 | 1–0 | 4–0 (Note: Round 19 match postponed due to heavy snowfalls that made the pitch unplayable. Match played after Round 25.) | 0–1 |
| Cherkaskyi Dnipro | 1–0 | 1–0 | 2–0 | | 1–0 | 1–0 | 2–2 | 1–2 | 0–2 | 0–0 | 0–0 | 1–0 | 1–0 | 0–1 | 2–1 | 0–2 | 3–0 | 3–0 |
| Desna Chernihiv | 5–1 | 2–0 | 0–0 | 1–1 | | 1–1 | 2–0 | 3–1 | 1–0 | 0–4 | 3–1 | 1–0 | 2–2 | 0–1 | 3–0 | 0–0 | 2–0 | 0–0 |
| Helios Kharkiv | 1–0 | 0–0 | 1–0 | 2–1 | 0–1 | | 0–1 | 0–2 | 1–0 | 0–0 | 2–0 | 1–0 | 0–0 | 1–0 | 1–0 | 1–0 | 4–1 | 2–1 |
| Hirnyk-Sport Horishni Plavni | 1–0 | 1–1 | 0–0 | 5–2 | 2–5 | 0–2 | | 1–3 | 3–1 | 0–0 | 3–1 | 0–1 | 0–2 | 4–0 | 3–0 | 1–0 | 2–0 | 1–6 |
| Illichivets Mariupol | 0–0 | 0–0 | 1–0 | 2–0 | 1–1 | 2–0 | 3–1 | | 1–0 | 3–1 | 2–0 | 1–0 | 3–0 | 3–1 | 2–1 | 5–1 | 3–0 (Note: FC Ternopil informed the Professional Football League of Ukraine and administration of Illichivets that the club would not play their Round 14 match due to a flu epidemic affecting the team with only seven players available for selection. (13 October 2016) Control-Disciplinary Committee of the FFU awards a 3–0 technical victory to Illichivets . (1 November 2016)) | 1–1 |
| Inhulets Petrove | 2–1 | 2–3 | 1–1 | 1–1 | 1–2 | 0–0 | 2–0 | 1–1 | | 0–0 | 1–0 | 1–3 | 0–1 | 1–0 | 1–0 | 1–3 | 3–0 | 1–2 |
| Kolos Kovalivka | 1–1 | 2–2 | 3–1 | 2–1 | 0–1 | 1–3 | 1–3 | 0–1 | 2–2 | | 5–3 | 1–0 | 2–0 | 1–0 | 0–1 | 0–0 | 4–1 | 2–1 |
| MFC Mykolaiv | 2–1 | 1–0 | 3–1 | 0–0 | 0–2 | 0–0 | 0–1 | 1–2 | 1–0 | 1–0 | | 0–3 (Note: Round 10 match between Mykolaiv and Naftovyk-Ukrnafta was postponed on mutual agreement to October 13 as Mykolaiv's Central City Stadium was unavailable. Match played after Round 13.) | 0–0 | 0–1 | 2–0 | 4–0 | 7–1 | 1–2 |
| Naftovyk-Ukrnafta Okhtyrka | 0–0 | 1–1 | 2–0 | 1–1 | 2–0 | 1–1 | 3–2 | 1–1 | 3–1 | 2–1 | 1–0 | | 1–2 | 3–1 | 1–2 | 4–0 | 2–1 | 2–0 |
| Obolon-Brovar Kyiv | 0–1 | 1–2 | 1–0 | 0–1 | 1–2 | 3–0 | 2–1 | 1–2 | 4–1 | 2–1 | 2–0 | 0–3 | | 0–1 | 1–0 | 3–2 | 2–0 | 0–0 |
| FC Poltava | 0–1 | 0–1 | 2–1 | 3–1 | 0–1 | 1–2 | 2–2 | 0–2 | 2–1 | 0–2 | 0–2 | 1–1 | 1–1 | | 2–1 | 0–2 | 3–1 | 0–1 |
| Skala Stryi | 1–1 | 0–1 | 0–3 | 0–0 | 2–5 | 0–1 | 3–2 | 0–1 | 0–1 | 1–2 | 0–0 | 0–0 | 2–2 | 3–1 | | 0–4 | 1–0 | 0–3 |
| PFC Sumy | 1–1 | 0–0 | 2–0 | 1–0 | 0–0 | 0–0 | 1–1 | 0–2 | 1–1 | 1–2 | 1–2 | 1–2 | 1–1 | 1–3 | 2–1 | | 1–1 | 0–2 |
| FC Ternopil | 2–1 | 0–1 | 0–2 | 1–1 | 0–2 | 0–1 | 1–1 | 0–1 | 0–2 | 0–2 | 2–1 | 0–0 | 0–0 | 0–1 | 1–0 | 2–2 | | 0–1 |
| Veres Rivne | 2–0 | 3–0 | 5–1 | 0–0 | 0–2 | 2–1 | 4–2 (Note: Veres played their Round 25 match without spectators due to sanctions imposed by the Control-Disciplinary Committee of the FFU for fan violence during the Round 21 against Kolos.) | 3–1 | 4–0 | 2–3 | 3–1 | 2–0 (Note: Round 15 fixture between Veres and Naftovyk-Ukrnafta was postponed until March 12 by mutual agreement. (12 October 2016) The match was played at Izotop Stadium in Varash.) | 1–1 | 2–2 | 1–1 | 2–1 | 4–2 | |

Updated to match(es) played on 2 June 2017. Source: (in Ukrainian)
Legend: Blue = home team win; Yellow = draw; Red = away team win.

=== Position by round ===
| Team ╲ Round | 1 | 2 | 3 | 4 | 5 | 6 | 7 | 8 | 9 | 10 | 11 | 12 | 13 | 14 | 15 | 16 | 17 | 18 | 19 | 20 | 21 | 22 | 23 | 24 | 25 | 26 | 27 | 28 | 29 | 30 | 31 | 32 | 33 | 34 |
|---|---|---|---|---|---|---|---|---|---|---|---|---|---|---|---|---|---|---|---|---|---|---|---|---|---|---|---|---|---|---|---|---|---|---|
| Illichivets Mariupol | 4 | 2 | 2 | 1 | 1 | 1 | 1 | 1 | 1 | 1 | 1 | 1 | 1 | 1 | 1 | 1 | 1 | 1 | 1 | 1 | 1 | 1 | 1 | 1 | 1 | 1 | 1 | 1 | 1 | 1 | 1 | 1 | 1 | 1 |
| Desna Chernihiv | 2 | 3 | 5 | 5 | 5 | 5 | 4 | 5 | 5 | 5 | 3 | 3 | 3 | 3 | 3 | 2 | 2 | 2 | 3 | 3 | 3 | 3 | 2 | 2 | 2 | 2 | 3 | 3 | 2 | 2 | 2 | 2 | 2 | 2 |
| Veres Rivne | 6 | 4 | 1 | 2 | 2 | 3 | 3 | 2 | 2 | 2 | 2 | 2 | 2 | 2 | 2 | 3 | 3 | 3 | 2 | 2 | 2 | 2 | 3 | 3 | 3 | 3 | 2 | 2 | 3 | 3 | 3 | 3 | 3 | 3 |
| Helios Kharkiv | 1 | 1 | 3 | 3 | 3 | 2 | 2 | 4 | 3 | 3 | 4 | 4 | 4 | 5 | 4 | 4 | 4 | 4 | 4 | 4 | 5 | 5 | 6 | 6 | 5 | 5 | 5 | 5 | 4 | 5 | 5 | 5 | 5 | 4 |
| Kolos Kovalivka | 12 | 14 | 8 | 6 | 4 | 4 | 5 | 3 | 4 | 4 | 5 | 5 | 5 | 6 | 6 | 7 | 6 | 5 | 6 | 5 | 4 | 4 | 4 | 4 | 4 | 4 | 4 | 4 | 5 | 4 | 4 | 4 | 4 | 5 |
| Naftovyk-Ukrnafta Okhtyrka | 7 | 9 | 15 | 12 | 8 | 9 | 8 | 6 | 7 | 7 | 6 | 6 | 6 | 4 | 5 | 5 | 5 | 6 | 5 | 6 | 6 | 6 | 5 | 5 | 6 | 6 | 6 | 6 | 6 | 6 | 6 | 6 | 7 | 6 |
| Avanhard Kramatorsk | 9 | 10 | 14 | 14 | 17 | 13 | 13 | 15 | 15 | 14 | 14 | 12 | 15 | 11 | 11 | 10 | 8 | 8 | 10 | 9 | 9 | 9 | 8 | 8 | 8 | 9 | 7 | 7 | 8 | 7 | 7 | 7 | 6 | 7 |
| Cherkaskyi Dnipro | 11 | 7 | 4 | 4 | 7 | 7 | 6 | 7 | 6 | 6 | 7 | 7 | 8 | 7 | 7 | 6 | 7 | 7 | 7 | 7 | 7 | 8 | 9 | 9 | 9 | 7 | 8 | 9 | 7 | 9 | 9 | 8 | 8 | 8 |
| Obolon-Brovar Kyiv | 5 | 6 | 6 | 7 | 6 | 6 | 9 | 10 | 12 | 10 | 9 | 10 | 10 | 8 | 10 | 11 | 11 | 10 | 8 | 10 | 10 | 10 | 11 | 10 | 10 | 10 | 11 | 10 | 11 | 8 | 8 | 10 | 9 | 9 |
| Arsenal Kyiv | 10 | 11 | 11 | 13 | 15 | 11 | 11 | 11 | 9 | 8 | 10 | 11 | 7 | 9 | 9 | 9 | 10 | 9 | 9 | 8 | 8 | 7 | 7 | 7 | 7 | 8 | 10 | 8 | 9 | 10 | 10 | 9 | 10 | 10 |
| Hirnyk-Sport Horishni Plavni | 14 | 17 | 13 | 16 | 13 | 17 | 17 | 17 | 17 | 17 | 16 | 17 | 17 | 17 | 16 | 17 | 17 | 17 | 17 | 15 | 15 | 13 | 12 | 12 | 14 | 13 | 12 | 12 | 12 | 12 | 11 | 11 | 11 | 11 |
| FC Poltava | 3 | 5 | 7 | 8 | 9 | 12 | 12 | 12 | 13 | 11 | 11 | 8 | 9 | 10 | 8 | 8 | 9 | 11 | 11 | 11 | 11 | 11 | 10 | 11 | 11 | 11 | 9 | 11 | 10 | 11 | 12 | 12 | 12 | 12 |
| Inhulets Petrove | 13 | 16 | 17 | 15 | 16 | 16 | 16 | 16 | 16 | 16 | 15 | 16 | 16 | 16 | 17 | 16 | 15 | 13 | 14 | 13 | 14 | 15 | 15 | 14 | 13 | 14 | 14 | 14 | 13 | 13 | 13 | 13 | 13 | 13 |
| MFC Mykolaiv | 17 | 15 | 16 | 17 | 14 | 10 | 10 | 9 | 8 | 9 | 8 | 9 | 11 | 14 | 14 | 12 | 13 | 14 | 12 | 12 | 12 | 12 | 14 | 15 | 15 | 15 | 15 | 15 | 15 | 15 | 15 | 14 | 14 | 14 |
| PFC Sumy | 8 | 13 | 9 | 9 | 10 | 14 | 15 | 13 | 14 | 15 | 17 | 14 | 13 | 12 | 13 | 13 | 14 | 15 | 15 | 16 | 16 | 16 | 16 | 16 | 16 | 16 | 16 | 16 | 16 | 16 | 16 | 16 | 16 | 15 |
| Bukovyna Chernivtsi | 16 | 8 | 12 | 11 | 12 | 8 | 7 | 8 | 10 | 12 | 12 | 13 | 12 | 13 | 12 | 14 | 12 | 12 | 13 | 14 | 13 | 14 | 13 | 13 | 12 | 12 | 13 | 13 | 14 | 14 | 14 | 15 | 15 | 16 |
| Skala Stryi | 15 | 12 | 10 | 10 | 11 | 15 | 14 | 14 | 11 | 13 | 13 | 15 | 14 | 15 | 15 | 15 | 16 | 16 | 16 | 17 | 17 | 17 | 17 | 17 | 17 | 17 | 17 | 17 | 17 | 17 | 17 | 17 | 17 | 17 |
| FC Ternopil | 18 | 18 | 18 | 18 | 18 | 18 | 18 | 18 | 18 | 18 | 18 | 18 | 18 | 18 | 18 | 18 | 18 | 18 | 18 | 18 | 18 | 18 | 18 | 18 | 18 | 18 | 18 | 18 | 18 | 18 | 18 | 18 | 18 | 18 |

Updated to match(es) played on 2 June 2017. Source: pfl.ua

== Relegation play-off ==
The draw for relegation play-off scheduling was held on 3 June 2017.

| Team 1 | Agg. | Team 2 | 1st leg | 2nd leg |
|---|---|---|---|---|
| PFC Sumy | 3–1 | FC Balkany Zorya | 2–0 | 1–1 |

=== First leg ===
6 June 2017
17:00 UTC+3

| PFC Sumy | 2–0 | FC Balkany Zorya |
|---|---|---|
| Oliynyk 36'; Yarovenko 60' (pen.) | Report |

Yuvileiny Stadium, Sumy
Referee: Serhiy Boyko (Kyiv Oblast)

=== Second leg ===
10 June 2017
17:00 UTC+3

| FC Balkany Zorya | 1–1 | PFC Sumy |
|---|---|---|
| Raichev 40' | Report | Bohachov 84' (pen.) |

Boris Tropaneț Stadium, Zorya, Sarata Raion, Odesa Oblast
Referee: Mykola Kryvonosov (Kyiv)

PFC Sumy wins 3–1 on aggregate and remains in First League. FC Balkany Zorya loses but later was promoted to the 2017–18 Ukrainian First League, due to sanctions against FC Dnipro.

== Top goalscorers ==
The season top goalscorers were:

| Rank | Scorer | Team | Goals (Pen.) |
|---|---|---|---|
| 1 | (Ukraine) Ruslan Stepanyuk | Veres Rivne | 24 (5) |
| 2 | (Ukraine) Ruslan Kisil | Illichivets Mariupol | 17 (1) |
| 3 | (Ukraine) Oleksandr Bondarenko | Kolos Kovalivka | 13 |
| 4 | (Ukraine) Illya Kovalenko (Note: Illya Kovalenko signed with FC Desna Chernihiv during winter break.) | Obolon-Brovar Kyiv / Desna | 12 (2) |
| 4 | (Ukraine) Viktor Berko | MFC Mykolaiv | 12 (4) |
| 6 | (Ukraine) Oleksandr Filippov | Desna Chernihiv | 11 (1) |
| 7 | (Ukraine) Levan Arveladze (Note: Levan Arveladze signed with FC Desna Chernihiv during winter break.) | Naftovyk-Ukrnafta / Desna | 10 (5) |
| 7 | (Ukraine) Oleksandr Pozdeyev | Kolos Kovalivka | 10 (8) |
| 9 | (Ukraine) Ruslan Fomin | Illichivets Mariupol | 9 |
| 9 | (Ukraine) Aderinsola Habib Eseola (Note: Aderinsola Habib Eseola signed with FC Zirka Kropyvnytskyi during winter break.) | Arsenal Kyiv | 9 (1) |

== Awards ==
=== Round awards ===
| Round | Player | | | Coach | | |
| Round | Player | Club | Reference | Coach | Club | Reference |
|---|---|---|---|---|---|---|
| Round 21 | (Ukraine) Oleksandr Yarovenko | PFC Sumy | | (Ukraine) Oleksandr Ryabokon | Desna Chernihiv | |
| Round 22 | (Ukraine) Vyacheslav Ryabov | Kolos Kovalivka | | (Ukraine) Serhiy Puchkov | Hirnyk-Sport Horishni Plavni | |
| Round 23 | (Ukraine) Denys Kozhanov | Illichivets Mariupol | | (Ukraine) Oleksandr Ryabokon (2) | Desna Chernihiv | |
| Round 24 | (Ukraine) Ruslan Stepanyuk | Veres Rivne | | (Ukraine) Ruslan Kostyshyn | Kolos Kovalivka | |
| Round 25 | (Ukraine) Vasyl Prodan | Obolon-Brovar Kyiv | | (Ukraine) Oleksandr Ryabokon (3) | Desna Chernihiv | |
| Round 26 | (Ukraine) Viktor Berko | MFC Mykolaiv | | (Ukraine) Vadym Yevtushenko | Cherkaskyi Dnipro | |
| Round 27 | (Ukraine) Oleksiy Moyseyenko | Hirnyk-Sport Horishni Plavni | | (Ukraine) Oleksandr Sevidov | Illichivets Mariupol | |
| Round 28 | (Ukraine) Levan Arveladze | Desna Chernihiv | | (Ukraine) Volodymyr Knysh | Naftovyk-Ukrnafta Okhtyrka | |
| Round 29 | (Ukraine) Serhiy Kravchenko | Helios Kharkiv | | (Ukraine) Oleksandr Ryabokon (4) | Desna Chernihiv | |
| Round 30 | (Ukraine) Andriy Shevchuk | Hirnyk-Sport Horishni Plavni | | (Ukraine) Oleksandr Kosevych | Avanhard Kramatorsk | |
| Round 31 | (Ukraine) Oleksandr Bondarenko | Kolos Kovalivka | | (Ukraine) Ruslan Kostyshyn (2) | Kolos Kovalivka | |
| Round 32 | (Ukraine) Denys Kozhanov | Illichivets Mariupol | | (Ukraine) Volodymyr Knysh (2) | Naftovyk-Ukrnafta Okhtyrka | |
| Round 33 | (Ukraine) Ihor Poruchynskyi | Skala Stryi | | (Ukraine) Anatoliy Bezsmertnyi | PFC Sumy | |
| Round 34 | (Ukraine) Artem Starhorodskyi | Arsenal-Kyiv | | (Ukraine) Serhiy Syzykhin | Helios Kharkiv | |

=== Season awards ===
The laureates of the 2016–17 season were:

- Best player: (Ukraine) Ruslan Stepanyuk (Veres Rivne)
- Best coach: (Ukraine) Oleksandr Ryabokon (Desna Chernihiv)
- Best goalscorer: (Ukraine) Ruslan Stepanyuk (Veres Rivne)

== See also ==
- 2016–17 Ukrainian Premier League
- 2016–17 Ukrainian Second League
- 2016–17 Ukrainian Cup
