= 2015–16 Ukrainian First League =

Ukrainian First League
- Season: 2015–16
- Champions: Zirka Kirovohrad
- Promoted: Zirka Kirovohrad
- Relegated: ~~Nyva~~ (withdrew); ~~Dynamo-2~~ (withdrew); ~~Hirnyk~~ (withdrew)
- Matches: 220
- Goals: 509 (2.31 per match)
- Top goalscorer: 16 – Artem Favorov (Obolon-Brovar)
- Biggest home win: Zirka 6–0 FC Ternopil (Round 5)
- Biggest away win: 4 – Nyva 0–4 FC Sumy (Round 3)
- Highest scoring: 7 – Hirnyk-Sport 3–4 FC Poltava (Round 29)
- Longest winning run: 6 – Zirka (Round 19–25)
- Longest unbeaten run: 9 – Helios (Rounds 1–9)
- Longest winless run: 8 –Illichivets (Rounds 3–4, 6, 8–9, ppd. 7, 10, ppd. 5)
- Longest losing run: 8 – Nyva (Round 6–9, Round 11–14)
- Highest attendance: 7,500 – Dnipro–Hirnyk (Round 20)
- Lowest attendance: 100 – Desna–FC Sumy(Round 12)

The 2015–16 Ukrainian First League was the 25th since its establishment. The competition commenced on 26 July 2015 with eight matches. The competition had a winter break which began after Round 18 on November 22. The competition resumed on 26 March 2016 and completed on 1 June 2016.

== Teams ==
The number of teams for the competition was confirmed on 19 June 2015.

=== Promoted teams ===
Two teams were promoted from the 2014–15 Ukrainian Second League.

- Cherkaskyi Dnipro – champion (returning as a successor of FC Dnipro Cherkasy that last participated in the 2007–08 Ukrainian First League, 7 seasons absence)
- Obolon-Brovar Kyiv – 2nd place runner-up (returning as a successor of FC Obolon Kyiv after an absence of three seasons)

=== Relegated teams ===
One team was promoted from the 2014–15 Ukrainian Premier League.

- Illichivets Mariupol – 14th place (returning after an absence of seven seasons)

=== Reinstated teams ===
- Avanhard Kramatorsk – special case (returning after an absence of one season)

=== Location map ===
The following displays the location of teams.

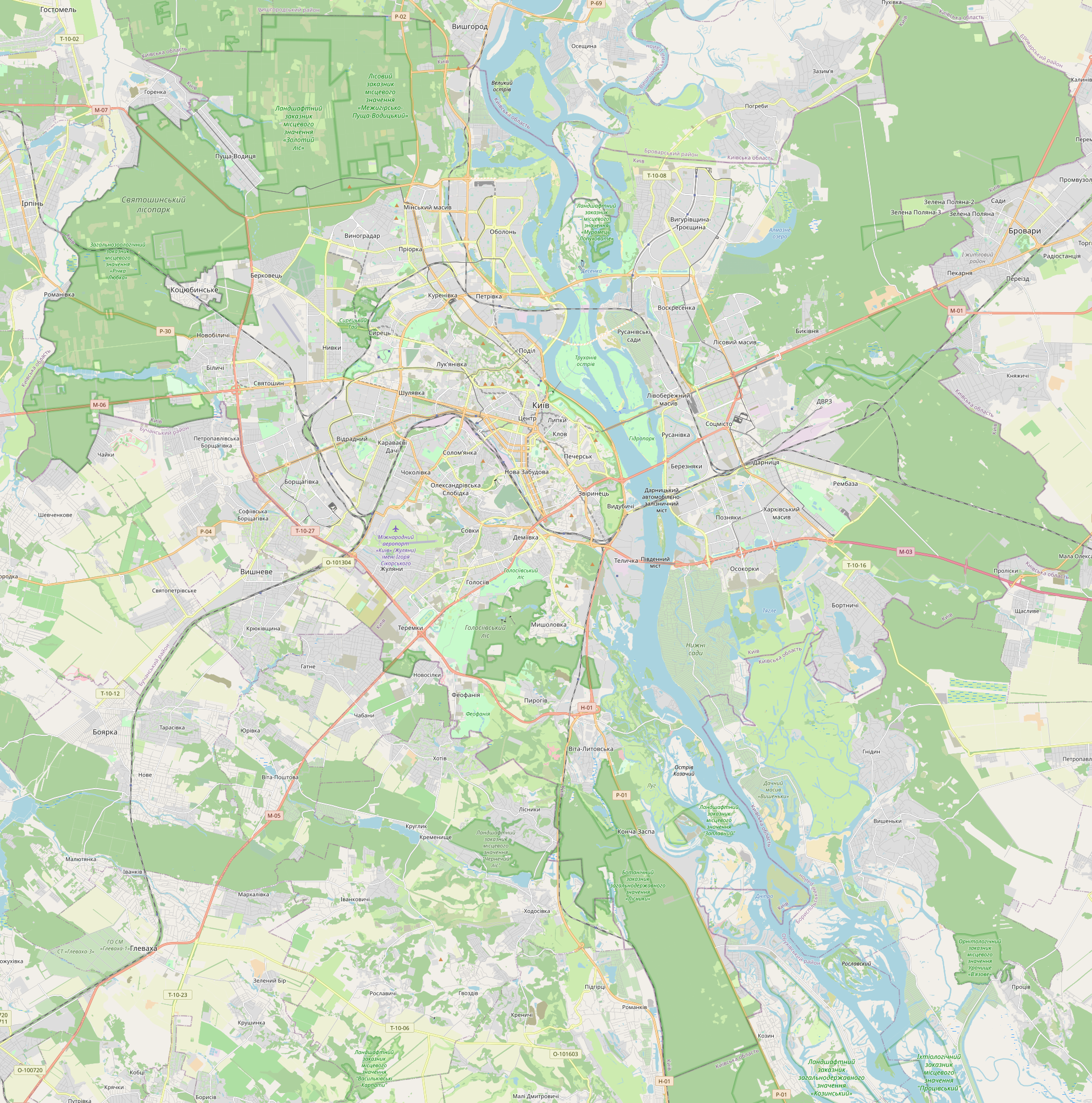
Kyiv city home venues of teams in the League
Home venues of teams in the 2015–16 Ukrainian First League.

=== Stadiums ===
The following stadiums are considered home grounds for the teams in the competition.

Rank	Stadium	Capacity	Club	Notes
1	Metalurh Stadium, Kryvyi Rih	29,783	Hirnyk Kryvyi Rih	
2	Yuvileiny Stadium, Sumy	25,800	FC Sumy	
3	Lobanovskyi Dynamo Stadium, Kyiv	16,873	Dynamo-2 Kyiv	Used as home ground in Round 14 and 17
4	Central City Stadium, Mykolaiv	16,700	MFC Mykolaiv	
5	Zirka Stadium, Kirovohrad	13,667	Zirka Kirovohrad	
6	Labor Reserve, Bila Tserkva	13,500	Desna Chernihiv	Used as home ground (Note: Due to reconstruction of their home ground Yuri Gagarin Stadium, Desna Chernihiv played their Round 12 home game in Bila Tserkva)
7	City Stadium, Ternopil	12,750	Nyva Ternopil	
7	City Stadium, Ternopil	12,750	FC Ternopil	
8	Illichivets Stadium, Mariupol	12,680	Illichivets Mariupol	
9	Yuri Gagarin Stadium, Chernihiv	12,060	Desna Chernihiv	
10	Central Stadion, Cherkasy	10,321	Cherkaskyi Dnipro	
11	Naftovyk Stadium, Okhtyrka	5,256	Naftovyk-Ukrnafta Okhtyrka	
12	Obolon Arena, Kyiv	5,100	Obolon-Brovar Kyiv	
13	Sonyachny Stadium, Kharkiv	4,924	Helios Kharkiv	
14	Avanhard Stadium, Kramatorsk	2,500	Avanhard Kramatorsk	
15	Lokomotov Stadium, Poltava	2,500	FC Poltava	
16	Yunist Stadium, Komsomolsk	2,500	Hirnyk-Sport Komsomolsk	
17	Dynamo Training Center, Kyiv	1,200	Dynamo-2 Kyiv	

== Managers ==
Club	Coach	Replaced coach
Avanhard Kramatorsk	(Ukraine) Yakiv Kripak	
Cherkaskyi Dnipro	(Ukraine) Ihor Stolovytskyi	
Desna Chernihiv	(Ukraine) Oleksandr Ryabokon	
Dynamo-2 Kyiv	(Ukraine) Vadym Yevtushenko	
Helios Kharkiv	(Ukraine) Serhiy Syzykhin	
Hirnyk Kryvyi Rih	(Ukraine) Hennadiy Prykhodko	
Hirnyk-Sport Komsomolsk	(Ukraine) Ihor Zhabchenko	
Illichivets Mariupol	(Ukraine) Valeriy Kriventsov	
MFC Mykolaiv	(Ukraine) Ruslan Zabranskyi	
Naftovyk-Ukrnafta Okhtyrka	(Ukraine) Volodymyr Knysh	
Nyva Ternopil	(Kazakhstan) Petr Badlo (interim)	(Ukraine) Roman Tolochko
Obolon-Brovar Kyiv	(Russia) Sergei Soldatov	
FC Poltava	(Ukraine) Anatoliy Bezsmertnyi (interim)	(Ukraine) Oleh Fedorchuk
FC Sumy	(Ukraine) Yuriy Yaroshenko	
FC Ternopil	(Ukraine) Vasyl Ivehesh	
Zirka Kirovohrad	(Ukraine) Serhiy Lavrynenko	

=== Managerial changes ===
Team	Outgoing head coach	Manner of departure	Date of vacancy	Table	Incoming head coach	Date of appointment
Helios Kharkiv	(Ukraine) Serhiy Syzykhin (interim)	Change of contract	1 July 2015	Pre-season	(Ukraine) Serhiy Syzykhin	1 July 2015
Nyva Ternopil	(Ukraine) Roman Tolochko	Resigns	9 September 2015	15th	(Kazakhstan) Petr Badlo (interim)	9 September 2015
FC Ternopil	(Ukraine) Vasyl Ivehesh	Hospitalized	13 May 2016	15th	(Ukraine) Ivan Maruschak (interim)	14 May 2016

== League table ==
Pos	Team	Pld	W	D	L	GF	GA	GD	Pts	Promotion or relegation
1	Zirka Kirovohrad (C, P)	30	20	5	5	49	22	+27	65	Promoted to Ukrainian Premier League
2	Cherkaskyi Dnipro	30	16	7	7	45	27	+18	55	
3	Obolon-Brovar Kyiv	30	16	6	8	45	35	+10	54	
4	Illichivets Mariupol	30	14	11	5	34	23	+11	53	
5	Helios Kharkiv	30	13	12	5	33	24	+9	51	
6	Hirnyk Kryvyi Rih (D)	30	13	10	7	39	27	+12	49	Withdrew after the season (Note: Several weeks after the season completed the administration of Hirnyk Kryvyi Rih announced that the club would withdraw from the PFL. (23 June 2016))
7	MFC Mykolaiv (Note: The Control Disciplinary Committee of the Football Federation of Ukraine deducted three points and fined the clubs Nyva Ternopil, FC Ternopil and MFC Mykolaiv for match fixing during the 2014–15 season. (2 September 2015))	30	13	8	9	34	27	+7	44	
8	Desna Chernihiv	30	11	7	12	30	29	+1	40	
9	Naftovyk-Ukrnafta Okhtyrka	30	11	7	12	31	33	−2	40	
10	FC Poltava	30	10	8	12	29	32	−3	38	
11	Dynamo-2 Kyiv (D)	30	9	9	12	27	34	−7	36	Withdrew after the season (Note: The management of the senior club FC Dynamo Kyiv prior to the last game of the season announced that the reserve club, Dynamo-2 Kyiv would be terminating after the completion of the season.)
12	Hirnyk-Sport Komsomolsk	30	8	9	13	30	35	−5	33	
13	Avanhard Kramatorsk	30	8	8	14	28	42	−14	32	
14	FC Sumy	30	8	6	16	35	54	−19	30	Avoided relegation playoff (Note: Originally the fourteenth placed was to have played in a promotion-relegation playoff series against the third team in the Second League competition. However, two days before the end of the season, on 30 May 2016 the PFL ruled that due to sporting principles to keep 16 teams in the First League the promotion-relegation playoff match between the third placed team in the Second League against the 14th placed team in the First League was cancelled and that the third placed team in the Second League would be automatically promoted to the First League.)
15	FC Ternopil	30	6	7	17	18	47	−29	22	Avoided relegation (Note: Originally, as per competition regulations, the fifteenth placed team, FC Ternopil was to be relegated to the Ukrainian Second League. However, after the season at the Conference of the PFL in preparation for the 2016–17 Ukrainian First League season the committee decided to expand the competition to eighteen teams and include FC Ternopil.)
16	Nyva Ternopil (D)	30	2	4	24	10	26	−16	7	Withdrew during the season (Note: Nyva Ternopil announced that it will not play the first games of the spring half of the competition. The club indicated that it would compete in the Ternopil Oblast competition. The Football Federation of Ukraine formally expelled the club from the competition on 1 April 2016. Later In April 2016, the club joined the 2016 Ukrainian Football Amateur League.)

Source: (in Ukrainian) Professional Football League of Ukraine
Rules for classification: 1) points 2) goal difference 3) goals scored
4) head-to-head points 5) head-to-head goal difference 6) head-to-head goals scored
7) head-to-head fair play (all games) 8) draw or playoff
(C) Champions; (D) Disqualified; (P) Promoted

=== Results ===
As of 1 June 2016

Home \ Away	AVK	CHD	DES	DK2	HEL	HIR	HIS	ILL	MYK	NAF	NVT	OBK	POL	SUM	TNP	ZIR
Avanhard Kramatorsk		1–1	1–1	1–0	0–0	0–1	2–1	0–2	0–2	2–3	+:-	1–2	0–0	3–0	2–0	0–2
Cherkaskyi Dnipro	2–0		2–0	3–1	1–1	2–1	3–0	3–2	0–2	1–0	3–1	4–0	2–1	2–0	2–0	2–2
Desna Chernihiv	3–1	3–1		1–2	0–1	1–1	0–2	0–1	0–1	1–2	+:-	0–2	2–1	4–1	1–1	1–0
Dynamo-2 Kyiv	2–1	2–2	3–1		0–0	0–0	1–1	1–0	0–0	0–0	1–0	1–3	2–1	4–1	2–1	0–1
Helios Kharkiv	2–0	1–1	0–1	1–1		2–1	1–1	0–0 (Note: Illichivets Mariupol postpones their Round 12 away match against Helios Kharkiv since several players were called for international duty. Match was played after Round 16.)	2–2	0–2	3–0 (Note: Nyva Ternopil informed the PFL that they would not arrive for their Round 10 match against Helios Kharkiv due to their difficult financial situation. Control Disciplinary Committee of the Football Federation of Ukraine awarded a 3–0 technical victory to Helios. (12 November 2015))	1–2	1–0	3–2	3–0	1–1
Hirnyk Kryvyi Rih	1–1	2–1	0–0	2–0	1–1		3–1	1–2	3–0	0–3	+:-	2–1	0–0	2–0	1–1	0–0
Hirnyk-Sport Komsomolsk	0–1	0–1	0–0	0–0	1–1	1–0 (Note: Round 4 match at Yunist Stadium between Hirnyk-Sport and Hirnyk was abandoned due to the waterlogged condition of the pitch due to torrential rain prior to the start of the match. The match was rescheduled and played after Round 12 on 14 October.)		1–1	3–1	2–0	1–3	1–2	3–4	3–0	1–3	1–1
Illichivets Mariupol	1–1	1–1	0–1 (Note: Illichivets Mariupol postpones their Round 7 home match against Desna Chernihiv since several players were called for international duty. Match played after Round 9.)	4–2	3–1	2–1	0–0		0–0	1–1	1–0	1–0	2–1	1–1 (Note: Illichivets Mariupol postpones their Round 5 home match against FC Sumy since several players were called for international duty. Match played after Round 10.)	0–0	3–0
MFC Mykolaiv	2–1	1–0	3–1	0–0	0–2	0–3	2–0	4–0		0–1	3–0	2–2	1–1	3–1	3–0	0–2
Naftovyk-Ukrnafta Okhtyrka	4–2	0–1	1–1	1–0	0–1	2–3	0–2	1–0	0–0		+:-	1–1	1–1	0–0	2–0	2–3
Nyva Ternopil (Note: Nyva Ternopil informed the PFL that the club will not be able to take part in the first game of the spring half of the season. (23 March 2016) Later the FFU formally expelled the club and awarded technical victories to their opponents. (1 April 2016))	0–1	1–1	2–0	-:+	-:+	0–1	0–0	-:+	-:+	0–1		-:+	0–1	0–4	-:+	0–1
Obolon-Brovar Kyiv	1–1	1–0	0–0	2–0	1–2	2–3	1–0	0–2	0–0	3–0	2–2		3–1	4–2	3–2	1–2
FC Poltava	0–1	0–2	0–1	2–0	0–0		1–0	1–2	1–0	3–1	+:-	1–2		2–2	1–0	1–0
PFC Sumy	3–2	0–1	0–4	2–1	0–0	2–2	0–1	0–1	2–1	2–0	1–1	2–0	1–3		4–1	0–1
FC Ternopil	1–1	1–0	0–2	1–0	0–1	0–3	1–1	1–1	0–1	1–0	1–0	0–2	1–1	0–1		1–2
Zirka Kirovohrad	5–1	2–0	1–0	2–1	4–0	2–1	1–3	0–0	2–1	1–0	+:-	1–2	2–0	2–0	6–0	

Updated to match(es) played on 1 June 2016. Source: (in Ukrainian)
Legend: Blue = home team win; Yellow = draw; Red = away team win.

=== Position by round ===
Team ╲ Round	1	2	3	4	5	6	7	8	9	10	11	12	13	14	15	16	17	18	19	20	21	22	23	24	25	26	27	28	29	30
Zirka Kirovohrad	13	14	7	4	1	3	2	2	1	2	1	1	1	1	1	1	1	1	1	1	1	1	1	1	1	1	1	1	1	1
Cherkaskyi Dnipro	9	3	8	5	8	4	3	4	2	5	3	4	3	4	3	3	3	3	3	3	4	3	3	3	2	2	4	3	2	2
Obolon-Brovar Kyiv	1	7	12	8	6	8	6	3	5	6	4	2	2	2	2	2	2	5	4	4	2	4	4	4	4	4	2	2	3	3
Illichivets Mariupol	2	1	2	3	7	9	9	9	10	14	11	13	10	11	10	7	8	8	7	6	6	6	6	6	6	6	5	4	4	4
Helios Kharkiv	10	11	6	2	4	2	4	5	3	4	6	6	7	9	8	8	5	4	5	5	5	5	5	5	5	5	6	6	6	5
Hirnyk Kryvyi Rih	14	5	4	7	5	5	7	8	6	3	2	3	4	3	4	4	4	2	2	2	3	2	2	2	3	3	3	5	5	6
MFC Mykolaiv	3	6	10	10	10	7	8	7	8	8	8	7	9	6	5	5	6	6	10	10	9	11	11	11	11	10	9	7	7	7
Desna Chernihiv	7	12	9	11	12	10	10	10	11	10	13	10	8	8	9	11	11	11	9	7	7	10	10	10	10	9	8	8	8	8
Naftovyk-Ukrnafta Okhtyrka	8	4	1	1	2	6	5	6	7	7	7	12	13	13	14	13	13	12	12	12	10	8	9	8	7	7	7	9	10	9
FC Poltava	6	8	13	14	9	12	12	11	9	9	9	11	12	10	12	9	9	10	8	8	8	7	7	7	8	8	10	10	9	10
Dynamo-2 Kyiv	4	2	3	6	3	1	1	1	4	1	5	5	5	5	6	6	7	7	6	9	11	9	8	9	9	11	13	12	12	11
Hirnyk-Sport Komsomolsk	12	10	11	13	15	15	16	14	15	13	12	9	6	7	7	10	10	9	11	11	13	13	12	12	12	13	11	11	11	12
Avanhard Kramatorsk	16	16	16	16	16	16	13	12	13	12	10	8	11	12	11	12	12	13	13	13	12	12	13	13	13	12	12	13	13	13
PFC Sumy	5	9	5	9	11	11	11	13	14	15	15	15	14	14	13	15	15	14	14	14	15	14	14	14	14	14	14	14	14	14
FC Ternopil	15	13	14	12	14	13	14	15	12	11	14	14	15	15	15	14	14	15	15	15	14	15	15	15	15	15	15	15	15	15
Nyva Ternopil	11	15	15	15	13	14	15	16	16	16	16	16	16	16	16	16	16	16	16	16	16	16	16	16	16	16	16	16	16	16

Updated to match(es) played on 1 June 2016. Source: pfl.ua

== Top goalscorers ==
As of 1 June 2016

Rank	Scorer	Goals (Pen.)	Team
1	(Ukraine) Artem Favorov	16 (3)	Obolon-Brovar Kyiv
2	(Ukraine) Yevhen Chepurnenko	11 (1)	Desna Chernihiv
3	(Ukraine) Artem Sitalo	10 (4)	Hirnyk Kryvyi Rih
3	(Ukraine) Serhiy Vakulenko	10 (6)	Illichivets Mariupol
5	(Ukraine) Volodymyr Bayenko	8	Hirnyk Kryvyi Rih
5	(Ukraine) Denys Skepskyi	8 (2)	Cherkaskyi Dnipro
7	(Ukraine) Borys Baranets	7	Zirka Kirovohrad
7	(Ukraine) Oleksandr Batalskyi	7	Cherkaskyi Dnipro

Rank	Scorer	Goals (Pen.)	Team
7	(Ukraine) Oleksiy Chychykov	7	Zirka Kirovohrad
7	(Ukraine) Ruslan Ivashko	7	Hirnyk-Sport Komsomolsk
7	(Ukraine) Roman Loktionov	7	Zirka Kirovohrad
7	(Ukraine) Vasyl Prodan	7	Obolon-Brovar Kyiv
7	(Ukraine) Artur Zahorulko	7	Illichivets Mariupol
7	(Ukraine) Denys Favorov (Note: Denys Favorov signed with Desna Chernihiv during the winter break.)	7 (1)	FC Poltava/Desna Chernihiv
7	(Ukraine) Ihor Sikorskyi	7 (4)	MFC Mykolaiv

== See also ==
- 2015–16 Ukrainian Premier League
- 2015–16 Ukrainian Second League
- 2015–16 Ukrainian Cup
