= FC Skala Stryi =

FC Skala Stryi may refer to:

- FC Skala Stryi (1911), a Ukrainian football team based in Stryi, Lviv oblast, dissolved in 2009; revived in 2020 as Skala 1911 Stryi
- FC Skala Stryi (2004), a Ukrainian football team from Stryi, Lviv oblast, dissolved in 2018
