= Ruslan Ivashko =

Ukrainian footballer

Personal information
- Full name: Ruslan Viktorovych Ivashko
- Date of birth: 10 November 1986 (age 40)
- Place of birth: Chernivtsi, Ukrainian SSR
- Height: 1.92 m (6 ft 3 1/2 in)
- Position: Forward

Youth career
- 1997–2004: Bukovyna Chernivtsi
- 2004: Tavriya Simferopol

Senior career*
Years	Team	Apps	(Gls)
2004–2006	Tavriya Simferopol	0	(0)
2005	→ Feniks-Illichovets Kalinine (loan)	2	(0)
2006–2007	Khimik Krasnoperekopsk	20	(4)
2007–2008	Illichivets Mariupol	17	(3)
2008	→ Illichivets-2 Mariupol	4	(0)
2008	Desna Chernihiv	4	(0)
2009–2010	Feniks-Illichovets Kalinine	50	(7)
2011	Arsenal Bila Tserkva	8	(0)
2011–2014	Hoverla Uzhhorod	0	(0)
2011	→ Prykarpattya Ivano-Frankivsk (loan)	12	(9)
2012	→ Enerhetyk Burshtyn (loan)	10	(2)
2012–2013	→ Poltava (loan)	28	(12)
2013	→ Nyva Ternopil (loan)	10	(0)
2014	Torpedo-BelAZ Zhodino	15	(1)
2015	Hirnyk-Sport Komsomolsk	26	(6)
2016–2017	Helios Kharkiv	37	(7)
2017	Isloch Minsk Raion	11	(3)
2018	Volyn Lutsk	3	(0)
2019–2020	Epitsentr Dunaivtsi (amateur)		
2020–2021	Epitsentr Dunaivtsi	40	(16)
2022	ASD Castellarano		
- * Club domestic league appearances and goals as of 31 December 2021

Ruslan Ivashko (Ukrainian: Руслан Вікторович Івашко; born 10 November 1986) is a Ukrainian former professional football forward.

Ivashko is the product of the FC Bukovyna and SC Tavriya sportive schools. His first trainer was Dmytro Hordey.

== Honours ==
Individual

- Best Player of round 17 of Ukrainian Second League: 2020–21
