= Oleh Kvych =

Ukrainian footballer

Personal information
- Full name: Oleh Kvych
- Date of birth: 12 September 1996 (age 30)
- Place of birth: Uzhhorod, Zakarpattia Oblast, Ukraine
- Height: 1.75 m (5 ft 9 in)
- Position: Midfielder

Team information
- Current team: FSC Stará Říše
- Number: 8

Youth career
- Skala Stryi

Senior career*
Years	Team	Apps	(Gls)
2013–2017	Skala Stryi	32	(4)
2017	Stal Rzeszow	10	(0)
2017	TJ Sokol Přibyslavice	4	(8)
2018	FC Zbrojovka Brno II	4	(1)
2018–2019	FSC Stará Říše		
2019	1.SC Znojmo	4	(0)
2019–2020	FSC Stará Říše		
2020–2021	TJ Sokol Přibyslavice		
2021–	FSC Stará Říše		

International career
2013–2014	Ukraine U18	14	(2)
2014–2015	Ukraine U19	6	(0)
- * Club domestic league appearances and goals as of 09:53, 12 September 2024 (UTC)

Oleh Kvych (born 12 September 1996) is a Ukrainian professional footballer who plays as a midfielder for Czech club FSC Stará Říše.

== Career ==
In the summer 2019, Kvych joined 1. SC Znojmo FK.
