= Sergei Pestryakov =

Russian footballer

Personal information
- Full name: Sergei Yuryevich Pestryakov
- Date of birth: 26 January 1989 (age 37)
- Place of birth: Moscow, Russian SFSR
- Height: 1.79 m (5 ft 10 1/2 in)
- Position: Midfielder

Youth career
- FShM-Torpedo Moscow

Senior career*
Years	Team	Apps	(Gls)
2009–2010	FC Sportakademklub Moscow	57	(6)
2011–2012	FC KAMAZ Naberezhnye Chelny	6	(0)
2012–2014	FC Volga Tver	45	(4)
2014	FC Zhemchuzhina Yalta	0	(0)
- * Club domestic league appearances and goals

Sergei Yuryevich Pestryakov (Russian: Серге́й Юрьевич Пестряков; born 26 January 1989) is a former Russian professional football player.

== Club career ==
He played in the Russian Football National League for FC KAMAZ Naberezhnye Chelny in 2011.
