= Heorhiy Kopaliani =

Ukrainian footballer

Personal information
- Full name: Heorhiy Mykolayovych Kopaliani
- Date of birth: 7 March 1994 (age 32)
- Place of birth: Kyiv, Ukraine
- Height: 1.92 m (6 ft 3 1/2 in)
- Position: Goalkeeper

Team information
- Current team: FC Juniors Shpytky (amateur)
- Number: 1

Youth career
- 2007–2011: FC Arsenal Kyiv

Senior career*
Years	Team	Apps	(Gls)
2012–2013	FC Arsenal Kyiv	1	(0)
2014	FC Poltava	0	(0)
2015	FC Arsenal Kyiv	6	(0)
2016–	FC Juniors Shpytky (amateur)	0	(0)
- * Club domestic league appearances and goals as of 18 January 2017

Heorhiy Kopaliani (Ukrainian: Георгій Миколайович Копаліані; born 7 March 1994) is a professional Ukrainian football goalkeeper who played for the amateur club FC Juniors Shpytky.

Kopaliani is a product of FC Arsenal.

Made his debut for FC Arsenal in a game against FC Shakhtar Donetsk on 5 October 2013 in the Ukrainian Premier League.
