= Oleksandr Kobelya =

Ukrainian footballer (born 2002)

Personal information
- Full name: Oleksandr Mykolayovych Kobelya
- Date of birth: 28 February 2002 (age 24)
- Place of birth: Terebovlia, Ukraine
- Position: Attacking midfielder

Youth career
- 2013–2015: DYuSSh Terebovlya
- 2015–2019: Ternopil

Senior career*
Years	Team	Apps	(Gls)
2018	Ternopil	8	(3)
2019	Kozova	12	(3)
2020–2021	Nyva Terebovlya	21	(0)
2021–2022	Nyva Ternopil	11	(0)
2022	Nyva Terebovlya	10	(3)
2023–2024	Kolos Buchach	31	(6)
- * Club domestic league appearances and goals as of 5 May 2025

Oleksandr Mykolayovych Kobelya (Ukrainian: Олександр Миколайович Кобеля; born 28 February 2002) is a Ukrainian professional footballer who plays as an attacking midfielder.
