= 2012 Ukrainian Football Amateur League =

Ukrainian Football Amateur League
- Season: 2012
- Dates: 2 May – 15 September 2012
- Champions: Karpaty Kolomyia (1st title) Lokomotyv Kupyansk (losing finalist)
- Promoted: 3 – (Ternopil, Zhemchuzhyna, SKA)
- Relegated: 8 teams (withdrawn)

The 2012 Ukrainian Football Amateur League season.

== Teams ==
=== Returning/reformed clubs ===
- Arsenal Kharkiv (returning, last played season in 1998–99)
- FC Ternopil (returning, last played season in 2010)

=== Debut ===
List of teams that are debuting this season in the league.

- Hvardiyets Hvardiyske
- Retro Vatutine
- Zhemchuzhina Yalta
- ITV Simferopol
- Savinyon Tairove
- Karpaty Kolomyia
- FC Tarutyne
- Lehion Zhytomyr
- FC Volodarka

=== Withdrawn ===
List of clubs that took part in last year competition, but chose not to participate in 2012 season:

- Arsenal Zhytomyr
- FC Lysychansk
- FC Sambir
- Avanhard Novohrad-Volynskyi
- Metalurh Malyn
- Yednist-2 Plysky
- Dinaz Vyshhorod
- FC Popasna
- SC Korosten
- FC Putrivka

=== Location map ===
Location of participating teams in the 2012 Ukrainian amateur championship

== First stage ==
=== Group 1 ===
Pos	Team	Pld	W	D	L	GF	GA	GD	Pts	Qualification
1	ODEK Orzhiv (Q)	10	9	0	1	20	5	+15	27	Finals
2	Retro Vatutine (Q)	10	6	1	3	10	7	+3	19	Finals
3	Karpaty Kolomyia (Q)	10	4	2	4	12	13	−1	14	Finals
4	Lehion Zhytomyr	10	3	1	6	7	17	−10	10	
5	Ternopil (Q)	10	3	0	7	8	5	+3	9	Second League
6	Volodarka	10	2	2	6	5	15	−10	8	

(Q) Qualified for the phase indicated

=== Group 2 ===
Pos	Team	Pld	W	D	L	GF	GA	GD	Pts	Qualification
1	Lokomotyv Kupiansk (Q)	6	5	0	1	10	3	+7	15	Finals
2	Nove Zhyttia Andriyivka (Q)	6	3	1	2	5	4	+1	10	Finals
3	Arsenal Kharkiv	6	2	0	4	5	12	−7	6	
4	Zhemchuzhyna Yalta (Q)	6	1	1	4	4	5	−1	4	Second League
5	Olimpik Kirovohrad	3	0	0	3	1	10	−9	0	

(Q) Qualified for the phase indicated

=== Group 3 ===
Pos	Team	Pld	W	D	L	GF	GA	GD	Pts	Qualification
1	Hvardiyets Hvardiyske (Q)	12	10	0	2	33	16	+17	30	Finals
2	Sovinyon Tayirove (Q)	12	9	1	2	33	10	+23	28	Finals
3	Torpedo Mykolaiv (Q)	12	7	2	3	26	24	+2	23	Finals
4	ITV Simferopol	12	5	1	6	22	27	−5	16	
5	Tarutyne	12	4	1	7	24	29	−5	13	
6	Foros	12	2	0	10	15	34	−19	6	
7	SKA Odesa (Q)	12	1	1	10	6	19	−13	4	Second League

(Q) Qualified for the phase indicated

== Finals ==
=== Group A ===
Pos	Team	Pld	W	D	L	GF	GA	GD	Pts	Qualification	KKO	HHV	TMY	NZA
1	Karpaty Kolomyia (H, Q)	3	2	1	0	6	4	+2	7	Final game	—	1–1	3–2	2–1
2	Hvardiyets Hvardiyske	3	1	2	0	3	2	+1	5			—	2–1	0–0
3	Torpedo Mykolaiv	3	1	0	2	5	6	−1	3				—	2–1
4	Nove Zhyttia Andriyivka	3	0	1	2	2	4	−2	1					—

(H) Hosts; (Q) Qualified for the phase indicated

=== Group B ===
Pos	Team	Pld	W	D	L	GF	GA	GD	Pts	Qualification	LKU	STA	ODK	RVA
1	Lokomotyv Kupiansk (Q)	3	2	0	1	7	2	+5	6	Final game	—	0–1	2–0	5–1
2	Sovinyon Tayirove	3	2	0	1	6	4	+2	6			—	0–3	5–1
3	ODEK Orzhiv	3	1	0	2	3	3	0	3				—	0–1
4	Retro Vatutine	3	1	0	2	3	10	−7	3					—

(Q) Qualified for the phase indicated

=== Championship match ===
15 September 2012
16:00

Karpaty Kolomyia	4 – 1	Lokomotyv Kupyansk
Tkachuk 34'; Oliynyk 36'; Rodevych 45+1', 71'	Report	Batusov 60'

Yunist Stadium, Kolomyia
Attendance: 4,500
Referee: Fedunets

== Number of teams by region ==
Number	Region	Team(s)
4	Autonomous Republic of Crimea	FC Foros, Hvardiets Hvardiyske, ITV Simferopol, Zhemchuzhyna Yalta
3	Odesa Oblast	Savinyon Tairove, SKA Odesa, FC Tarutyne
2	Kharkiv Oblast	Arsenal Kharkiv, Lokomotyv Kupiansk
1	Cherkasy Oblast	Retro Vatutine
1	Ivano-Frankivsk Oblast	Karpaty Kolomyia
1	Kirovohrad Oblast	Olimpik Kirovohrad
1	Kyiv Oblast	FC Volodarka
1	Mykolaiv Oblast	Torpedo Mykolaiv
1	Poltava Oblast	Nove Zhyttia Andriivka
1	Rivne Oblast	ODEK Orzhiv
1	Ternopil Oblast	FC Ternopil
1	Zhytomyr Oblast	Lehion Zhytomyr
