= Oleksiy Rodevych =

Ukrainian footballer

Personal information
- Full name: Oleksiy Stanislavovych Rodevych
- Date of birth: 11 August 1988 (age 38)
- Place of birth: Kolomyia, Ivano-Frankivsk Oblast, Ukrainian SSR
- Height: 1.87 m (6 ft 2 in)
- Position: Midfielder

Team information
- Current team: FC Karpaty Kolomyia

Senior career*
Years	Team	Apps	(Gls)
2007–2012	FC Karpaty Lviv	0	(0)
2007–2008	FC Karpaty-2 Lviv	24	(2)
2010–2012	→ MFC Mykolaiv (loan)	33	(10)
2012–	FC Karpaty Kolomyia	15	(7)
- * Club domestic league appearances and goals as of 26 February 2013

Oleksiy Rodevych (Ukrainian: Олексій Станіславович Родевич; born 11 August 1988) is a professional Ukrainian football midfielder. He is the product of the Karpaty Lviv Youth School System.
