= Vitaliy Myrnyi =

Ukrainian footballer (born 1992)

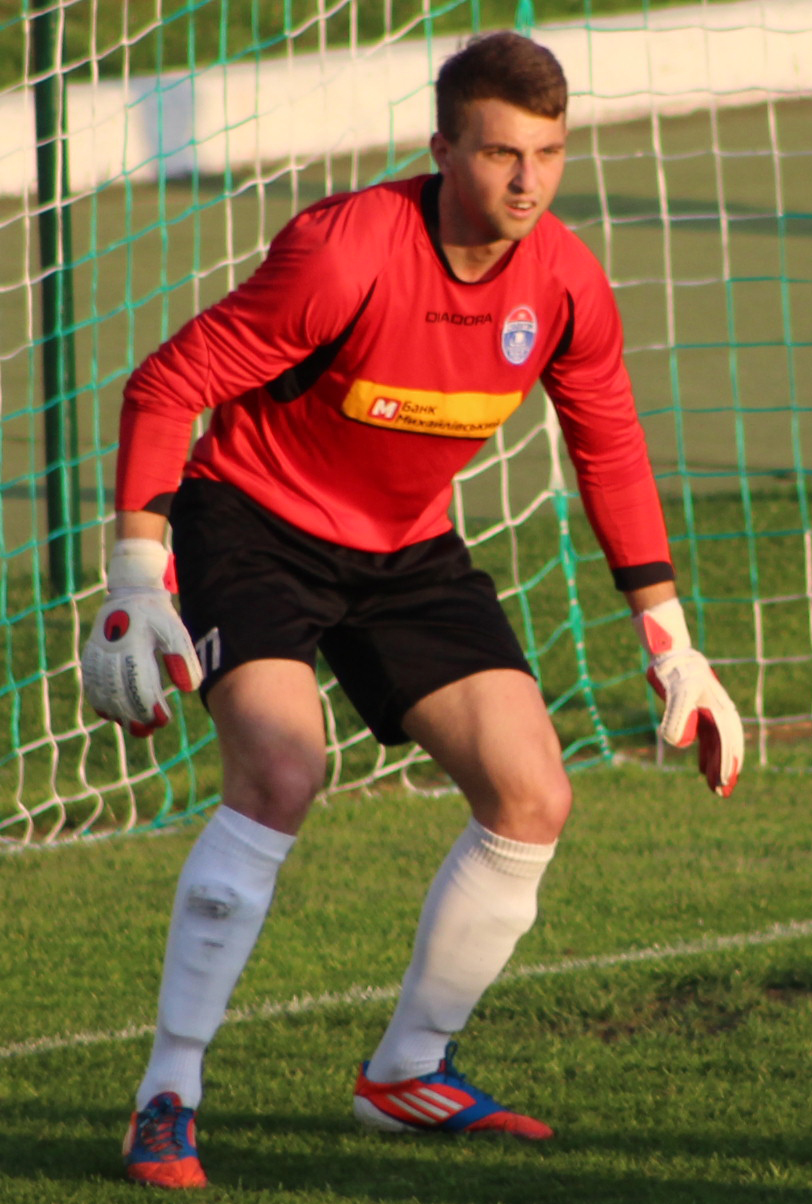

Personal information
- Full name: Vitaliy Oleksandrovych Myrnyi
- Date of birth: 3 April 1992 (age 34)
- Place of birth: Poltava, Ukraine
- Height: 1.85 m (6 ft 1 in)
- Position: Goalkeeper

Youth career
- 2005–2008: Molod Poltava
- 2008–2009: Kremin Kremenchuk

Senior career*
| Years | Team | Apps | (Gls) |
| 2010–2011 | Levadia II Tallinn | 16 | (0) |
| 2011 | Levadia Tallinn | 0 | (0) |
| 2011–2013 | Banga Gargždai | 57 | (0) |
| 2014–2016 | Cherkaskyi Dnipro | 34 | (0) |
| 2016 | Utenis Utena | 8 | (0) |
| 2016 | Ternopil | 9 | (0) |
| 2017 | Cherkaskyi Dnipro | 0 | (0) |
| 2017 | Olimpiya Savyntsi | 1 | (0) |
| 2017–2018 | Hirnyk-Sport Horishni Plavni | 18 | (0) |
| 2018 | Neftchi Fergana | 9 | (0) |
| 2018 | Hirnyk-Sport Horishni Plavni | 2 | (0) |
| 2019 | Andijon | 18 | (0) |
| 2020 | Chornomorets Odesa | 0 | (0) |
| 2021 | Kremin Kremenchuk | 9 | (0) |
- * Club domestic league appearances and goals as of 17 February 2022

Vitaliy Oleksandrovych Myrnyi (Ukrainian: Віталій Олександрович Мирний; born 3 April 1992) is a Ukrainian professional footballer who plays in the goalkeeper position.
