= Nazar Kmit =

Ukrainian footballer

Personal information
- Full name: Nazar Mykolayovych Kmit
- Date of birth: 11 September 1993 (age 33)
- Place of birth: Ukraine
- Position: Midfielder

Senior career*
Years	Team	Apps	(Gls)
2012–2017	Skala Stryi	103+	(3+)
- * Club domestic league appearances and goals

Nazar Mykolayovych Kmit (Ukrainian: Назар Миколайович Кміть; born 11 September 1993) is a Ukrainian retired footballer.

== Career ==
While attending the EduKick academy in Spain, Kmit trialed with English side Preston North End.

In 2012, he signed for Skala Stryi in the Ukrainian third division, where his father Mykola Kmit was president. After making 103 appearances for the club, Kmit sustained an injury, with the doctors advising him to take a 1-year break from football. During that time, he decided to retire due to starting a dairy farm.
