= Kalinine, Krasnohvardiiske Raion =

Village in Crimea, Ukraine

Kalinine Калініне
- Village
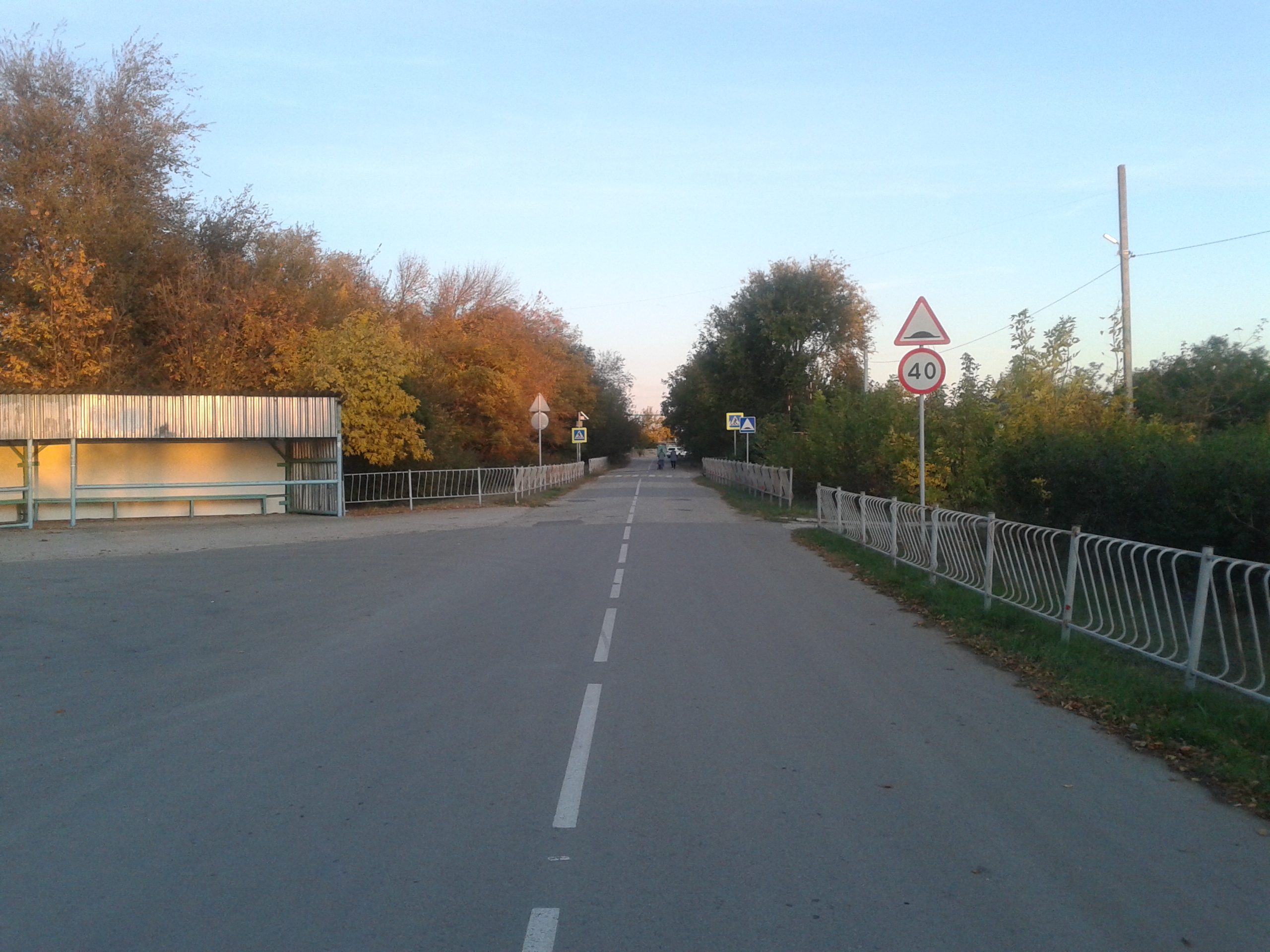

- Location within Crimea Location within Ukraine
- Coordinates: 45°35′28″N 34°13′26″E
- Country: Ukraine (occupied by Russia)
- Republic: Autonomous Republic of Crimea
- Raion: Krasnohvardiiske Raion
- Elevation: 38 m (125 ft)

Population (2001)
  - Total: 1,156
- Time zone: UTC+2 (EET)
  - Summer (DST): UTC+3 (EEST)
- Postal code: 97006
- Area code: +380 6556
- Vehicle registration: AK/KK/01

Kalinine (Ukrainian: Калініне; Russian: Калинино) or Umiut (Ukrainian: Умют; Crimean Tatar: Ümüt) is a village in the Krasnohvardiiske Raion (district) of the Autonomous Republic of Crimea, a territory recognized by a majority of countries as part of Ukraine and currently occupied and unilaterally annexed by Russia. Its population is 1,156.

== History ==
The village was established in 1925 by those who resettled from the Kiev Governorate. On initiative of Jewish population, the village was renamed Kalinindorf in 1930s. During the World War II 65 residents of the village fought against the Nazi Germany and 21 of them perished. On May 18, 1948, Kalinindorf was renamed to Kalinine.

During the Soviet period, the village housed a collective farm "imeni Kalinina", a few factories, and other agricultural and food production enterprises.

== Kalinine rural council ==
Kalinine is the administrative seat of a rural council, a type of raion subdivision. The Kalinine rural council consists of four populated places, including the village of Kalinine. Other places are Vyshniakivka, Komunary, and Pobiedyne.

== Demographics ==
As of the 2001 Ukrainian census, the village had a population of 1,156 inhabitants. It is estimated that ethnic Ukrainians, of whom roughly 60% are native Russian speakers, make up the largest ethnic group in the village. Other significant groups are Russians and Crimean Tatars. The exact native language composition was as follows:

First languages in Kalinine
	percent
Russian	65.4%
Ukrainian	21.8%
Crimean Tatar	11.9%
Belarusian	0.3%
Romanian	0.1%
others	0.3%

== Sports ==
The village has a stadium and, in the past, hosted the Ukrainian professional football club Feniks-Illichovets Kalinine.

== See also ==
- Kalynivske, Kherson Oblast
