= Dmytro Oliynyk =

Ukrainian footballer

Personal information
- Full name: Dmytro Ruslanovych Oliynyk
- Date of birth: 25 February 1993 (age 33)
- Place of birth: Amvrosiivka, Ukraine
- Height: 1.76 m (5 ft 9 in)
- Position: Right midfielder

Youth career
- 2006–2010: Olimpik Donetsk

Senior career*
| Years | Team | Apps | (Gls) |
| 2010–2015 | Shakhtar Donetsk | 0 | (0) |
| 2010–2015 | → Shakhtar-3 Donetsk | 73 | (6) |
| 2013 | → Olimpik Donetsk (loan) | 4 | (0) |
| 2014 | → Poltava (loan) | 6 | (0) |
| 2015–2016 | Sumy | 16 | (0) |
| 2016–2017 | Veres Rivne | 0 | (0) |
| 2017 | Sumy | 10 | (1) |
| 2017–2018 | Poltava | 24 | (0) |
| 2018–2021 | Metalurh Zaporizhzhia | 54 | (10) |
| 2021–2023 | Obolon Kyiv | 17 | (0) |
| 2023 | Druzhba Myrivka | 2 | (2) |
| 2023–2024 | Mariupol | 11 | (1) |
- * Club domestic league appearances and goals as of 3 July 2024

Dmytro Ruslanovych Oliynyk (Ukrainian: Дмитро Русланович Олійник; born 25 February 1993) is a Ukrainian professional footballer who plays as a right midfielder.
