= Taras Chervonetskyi =

Ukrainian footballer (born 1995)

Personal information
- Full name: Taras Mykolayovych Chervonetskyi
- Date of birth: 10 June 1995 (age 31)
- Place of birth: Ternopil, Ukraine
- Height: 1.72 m (5 ft 7 1/2 in)
- Position: Defender

Youth career
- 2008–2011: Youth Sportive School Ternopil
- 2012–2013: Youth Sportive School #5 Sevastopol

Senior career*
Years	Team	Apps	(Gls)
2011	Ternopil	?	(?)
2013–2014	Sevastopol	1	(0)
2013	→ Sevastopol-2	8	(0)
2014	Dnipro Dnipropetrovsk	0	(0)
2016	Bakhchysarai	2	(1)
2016–2017	Ternopil	28	(1)
2020–2021	Epitsentr Dunaivtsi	?	(?)
- * Club domestic league appearances and goals as of 3 September 2020

Taras Chervonetskyi (Ukrainian: Тарас Миколайович Червонецький; born 10 June 1995 in Ternopil, Ukraine) is a Ukrainian football midfielder who played for FC Epitsentr Dunaivtsi in the Ukrainian Second League.

== Career ==
Chervonetskyi is a product of the Youth Sportive School Ternopil system. His first trainer was Vasyl Zatorskyi. In 2012, he signed a contract with FC Sevastopol.
