= Pavlo Kikot =

Ukrainian footballer and coach

Personal information
- Full name: Pavlo Mykolayovych Kikot
- Date of birth: 27 September 1967 (age 59)
- Place of birth: Kyiv, Ukrainian SSR
- Position: Defender

Youth career
- Dynamo Kyiv Sports School
- Skhid Kyiv

Senior career*
Years	Team	Apps	(Gls)
1986	Mashynobudivnyk Borodianka		
1988–1989	Dynamo Bila Tserkva	8	(0)
1990	Sula Lubny		
1990	Vyšná Šebastová		
1991–1993	Bukoza Vranov nad Topľou		
1994–1995	Obolon-Zmina Kyiv	11	(0)
1994–1995	JOKO Slovácko-Slavia Uherské Hradiště		
1996–1999	Dnipro Kyiv	35	(1)

Managerial career
- 1999: Interkas Kyiv
- 2000: Dnipro Kyiv
- 2009–2010: Dynamo Kyiv Football School (staff)
- 2014: Skala Stryi (youth)
- 2014–2016: Skala Stryi (U19)
- 2016–2017: Sumy
- * Club domestic league appearances and goals

Pavlo Mykolayovych Kikot (Ukrainian: Павло Миколайович Кікоть; born 27 September 1967) is a former Soviet and Ukrainian footballer and football coach.

== Career ==
Since 2016 till January 2017 he worked a coach of Sumy.
