= Andrei Zavyalov =

Turkmen footballer

Andrei Zavyalov Андрій Зав'ялов
Personal information
- Full name: Andrei Aleksandrovich Zavyalov
- Date of birth: 2 January 1971 (age 55)
- Place of birth: Bila Tserkva, Ukrainian SSR
- Height: 1.78 m (5 ft 10 in)
- Position: Midfielder

Youth career
- RSShI Kyiv
- FC Dynamo Kyiv

Senior career*
Years	Team	Apps	(Gls)
1989–1990	FC Dynamo Kyiv	0	(0)
1990–1991	FC Dynamo Bila Tserkva	81	(15)
1992–1994	FC Dynamo Kyiv	14	(3)
1992–1994	→ FC Dynamo-2 Kyiv (loans)	75	
1995	PFC Nyva Vinnytsia	5	(1)
1995	FC KAMAZ Naberezhnye Chelny	3	(0)
1995	→ FC KAMAZ-d Naberezhnye Chelny (loan)	3	(1)
1995–1996	FC Dynamo-2 Kyiv	20	(6)
1996–1997	FC Prykarpattya Ivano-Frankivsk		
1997–2001	FC Metalurh Donetsk	84	(5)
1997–1998	→ FC Metalurh-2 Donetsk	5	(1)
2001	FC Polihraftekhnika Oleksandria	6	(0)
2002	FC Kryvbas Kryvyi Rih	13	(2)
2002–2003	Hapoel Ironi Rishon LeZion	31	(1)
2003	FC Zakarpattia Uzhhorod	14	(0)
2004	FC CSKA Kyiv	16	(1)
2004	FC Esil Bogatyr	18	(2)
2004–2005	FC Stal Dniprodzerzhynsk	6	(0)
2005	FC Ekibastuzets	11	(1)
2006–2008	FC CSKA Kyiv	23	(0)

International career
1998–1999	Turkmenistan	3	(1)

Managerial career
- 2010–2012: FC Poltava (assistant)
- 2012–2013: FC Poltava-2 Karlivka
- 2016: FC Poltava (caretaker)
- * Club domestic league appearances and goals

Andrei Aleksandrovich Zavyalov (Ukrainian: Андрій Олександрович Зав'ялов, romanized: Andrii Oleksandrovych Zavialov; Russian: Андрей Александрович Завьялов; born 2 January 1971) is a football coach and former player. Born in Ukraine, he represented Turkmenistan internationally.

== Career ==
He started his career with FC Dynamo Kyiv.

== Honours ==
Dynamo Kyiv

- Ukrainian Premier League champion: 1992–93, 1993–94
- Ukrainian Cup winner: 1992–93

== International ==
He represented Turkmenistan national football team at the 1998 Asian Games.
