= Vasyl Prodan =

Ukrainian footballer

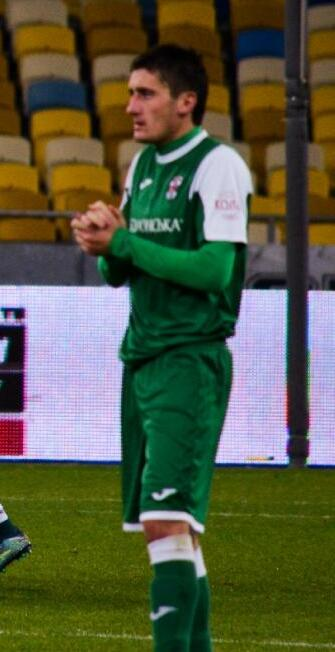
- Prodan with Obolon-Brovar Kyiv in 2015

Personal information
- Full name: Vasyl Vasylyovych Prodan
- Date of birth: 15 March 1988 (age 38)
- Place of birth: Ukrainian SSR, Soviet Union
- Position: Midfielder

Youth career
- 2002–2004: Sports school 11 Chonomorets Odesa
- 2004: Sports school 9 Byelanov Spartak Odesa
- 2004–2005: Sports school 11 Chonomorets Odesa

Senior career*
Years	Team	Apps	(Gls)
2005–2011	FC Dnister Ovidiopol	149	(7)
2011–2013	FC Real Pharma Odesa	66	(18)
2014–2018	FC Obolon-Brovar Kyiv	108	(30)
2019–2020	Kudrivka	2	(0)
- * Club domestic league appearances and goals as of 31 December 2018

Vasyl Prodan (Ukrainian: Василь Васильович Продан; born 15 March 1988) is a professional Ukrainian football midfielder who currently plays for FC Obolon-Brovar Kyiv in the Ukrainian First League.

Prodan is a product of the Odessa city football academies including Chornomorets and Spartak. He became noticeable during the 2015-16 Ukrainian First League season when he scored seven goals playing for Obolon-Brovar.
