= FC Zhemchuzhina Yalta =

Ukrainian association football team

- Full name: Football Club Zhemchuzhina Yalta
- Founded: 2010
- Dissolved: 2014
- Ground: Avanhard Stadion

FC Zhemchuzhina Yalta (Russian: «Жемчужина» (Ялта); FC Zhemchuzhyna Yalta in Ukrainian transliteration (Ukrainian: „Жемчужина“» (Ялта)) was a professional football club based in Yalta. Founded in 2010, the club reached the Ukrainian Second League for the 2012–13 season. In June 2013 it was refused a license for the league, however, and expelled from professional football, due to the club's debts. Following the annexation of Crimea by the Russian Federation, Zhemchuzhina were accepted into the Russian Professional Football League for the 2014–15 season. As Ukraine considers Crimea Ukrainian territory, Football Federation of Ukraine lodged a complaint with UEFA about Crimean clubs' participation in Russian competitions. UEFA's judgment is that any matches Zhemchuzhina plays "under the auspices of the Russian Football Union will not be recognised".

On 4 December 2014 UEFA banned Crimean clubs from participating in Russian professional competitions, and announced that a new local Crimean league will be set up in the future that UEFA will manage directly.

== History ==
Zhemchuzhyna Yalta was founded in 2010 after the withdrawal of FC Feniks-Illichovets Kalinine from the Ukrainian First League. The team declared its readiness to take over the rest of season in the First league. However, Zhemchuzhyna was unable to get a license for the right to participate in the first league through licensing regulations of UEFA and FFU. The investors of Zhemchuzhyna guaranteed stable funding only if the club moved to Yalta.

The team did not enter the PFL in the 2011–12 season. Instead the team participated in the championship of the Crimea and the amateur championship of Ukraine. In 2012–2013 season the club gained professional status and entered in the Ukrainian Second League championship in Ukraine. In June 2013 the club was refused attestation and expelled from the Ukrainian Second League because of numerous debts to players, staff and others.

Following the annexation of Crimea by the Russian Federation, Zhemchuzhina were accepted into the Russian Professional Football League for the 2014–15 season.

The team has a training base for sports called "Inkomsport" in Kuibysheve, which is approximately 60 miles from Yalta.

== League and cup history ==
=== Ukraine ===
Season	Div.	Pos.	Pl.	W	D	L	GS	GA	P	Domestic Cup	Europe	Notes
2012	4th (Amatorska Liha)	4	6	1	1	4	4	5	4			
2012–13	3rd (Druha Liha)	13	24	4	4	16	21	48	13	1/16 finals		−3; qualified to Group 3
2012–13	3rd (Druha Liha)	3	6	1	1	4	5	10	4	1/16 finals		Stage 2

=== Russia ===
Season	Div.	Pos.	Pl.	W	D	L	GS	GA	P	Domestic Cup	Europe	Notes
2014-15	3rd "South Group 1" (Vtoraya Liga, Yug Gruppa 1)	—_{/11}	17	3	4	10	13	31	13	1/256 finals		Annulled

== Head coaches ==
- 2010-2014 Ivan Marushchak
- 2014-2014 Vyacheslav Zhygailov

== See also ==
- FC Feniks-Illichovets Kalinine
