= FC Karpaty Kolomyia =

FC Karpaty Kolomyia is an amateur Ukrainian football club from Kolomyia, Ivano-Frankivsk Oblast. The head coach of the senior team is Vasyl Blyasetsky. Karpaty plays at the Yunist Stadium that has 5,000 seats.

The club was founded in 2006 as FC Karpaty Pechenizhyn and until 2011 played in the town of Pechenizhyn at Karpaty Stadium. After moving to Kolomyia in 2011, Karpaty applied to be admitted to the Ukrainian Second League in November 2011. In summer of 2012 the original president of the club Dmytro Lashchuk left the club and recreated a new FC Karpaty Pechenizhyn in Pechenizhyn. In 2012 Karpaty Kolomyia won the Amateur Championship of Ukraine.
