= FC Feniks-Illichovets Kalinine =

Feniks-Illichovets Kalinine
- Full name: Futbol′nyy klub Feniks-Illichovets Kalinine
- Founded: 2000
- Dissolved: 2011
- Ground: Stadium Yunist, Kalinine, Crimea
- Capacity: 1,050
- 2010–11: Ukrainian First League, 18th
Home colours

FC Feniks-Illichovets Kalinine (Ukrainian: Фенікс-Іллічовець (also Фенікс-Іллічiвець); Russian: Феникс-Ильичёвец) was a Ukrainian football club based in Kalinine which is located south-west of Dzhankoy (in the Crimea region).

== History ==
The team was winner of the Crimea championship in 2005, its bronze medallist in 2004 and 2006 and silver medallist of the Ukrainian amateur championship in 2005. In 2006/07 season they played in the Ukrainian Second League (group B), became runners-up and were promoted to the First League.

They participated in the Ukrainian First League until the club folded and withdrew from the competition during the winter break of the 2010–11 Ukrainian First League season.

The club attempted to reform at the end of 2010 as FC Zhemchuzhyna (Perlyna – in Ukrainian), in Yalta, Ukraine but the PFL did not allow for the transfer to occur.

The club's president was Andrey Ryumshin.

== League and cup history (Ukraine) ==
Season	Div.	Pos.	Pl.	W	D	L	GS	GA	P	Domestic Cup	Europe	Notes
2003	5th Crimean Championship	4_{/15}	28	17	5	6	43	28	56			
2004	5th Crimean Championship	3_{/15}	28	21	2	5	58	30	65			
2005	5th Crimean Championship	1_{/14}	26	21	3	2	90	22	66			Admitted to Amateur League
2005	4th Amateur League Gr. 2	1_{/5}	6	5	0	1	15	5	15			Final (2nd, admitted)
2006–07	3rd Second League Gr. B	2_{/16}	28	17	6	5	42	22	57	1/32 finals		Promoted
2007–08	2nd First League	16_{/20}	38	11	8	19	35	56	41	1/32 finals		
2008–09	2nd First League	13_{/18}	32	9	11	12	33	38	38	1/8 finals		
2009–10	2nd First League	14_{/18}	34	10	7	17	39	52	37	1/8 finals		
2010–11	2nd First League	18_{/18}	34	3	2	29	17	48	8	1/8 finals		−3 – withdrew

== Head coaches ==
- (Ukraine) Oleksandr Haidash (2008–09)
- (Ukraine) Ivan Maruschak (2010–2011)

== Honours ==
- Crimea championship (Ukrainian Lower League Tier)

2005

== See also ==
- FC Yalos Yalta
- FC Zhemchuzhyna Yalta
