= FC Ternopil =

Ternopil
- Full name: Football Club Ternopil
- Founded: 2007
- Ground: Ternopilsky Misky Stadion
- Capacity: 15,150
- Chairman: Mykola Krut (Ternopil municipality)
- Manager: Andriy Yablonskyi
- League: Ternopil Oblast Championship
- 2020–21: 6th

FC Ternopil is a Ukrainian football club based in Ternopil, Ukraine. The club was originally created as a second team of FC Nyva Ternopil. After its reformation and return to professional level, the club competed in the Ukrainian Second League.

== History ==
=== Nyva Ternopil farm team ===
In 2000 at the initiative of Ternopil Mayor Anatoliy Kucherenko, the Ternopil Pedagogical Lyceum (college) of the Ternopil Volodymyr Hnatyuk National Pedagogical University established a team Nyva Ternopil-2, which became a farm club of Nyva Ternopil. The club participated in the Ukrainian Second League during the 2000–01 and 2001–02 seasons. However, after the winter beak in 2002 the club changed their name to FC Ternopil. At the end of the 2001–02 season the main club was relegated from the Ukrainian First League and FC Ternopil lost its professional license.

In 2003, the team called Burevisnyk was formed and began competing in the top league of Ternopil obslast, representing Ternopil Pedagogical University.

=== Independent municipal team and club ===
On May 16, 2007 the team ceased its affiliation with Nyva Ternopil and formed a single club – Ternopil-Burevisnyk. In the same year the team won their first trophy – as champions of Ternopil oblast.

The club continued to perform successfully in the Ternopil Oblast league as well as winning the Ternopil Oblast Cup and Super Cup in 2010 and 2011.

The club also represented Ukraine in the European University games and were champions in 2009.

In June 2012 the club applied for a professional license with the PFL and was granted entry to the Ukrainian Second League for the 2012–13 season.

After two seasons the club was promoted to the Ukrainian First League after finishing 3rd in 2014. In the 2015–16 season the club finished in 15th and were to be relegated but the Professional Football League of Ukraine decided to expand the competition for the next season to 18 teams and the club was left in the First League.

=== Ternopil sports school ===
In 2018 the Ternopil sports school financed by the municipal government and under the same logo as the city's club entered national amateur football competitions. The head coach of the team Andiry Yablonskyi in interview stated that the new team is not a direct descendant of the former city's club. Many players were taken from another city's team Ternopil-Pedlitsei that competes at regional level.

== Honors ==
- Champions of Ternopil Oblast – 2007, 2009, 2010, 2011
- Ternopil Oblast Cup Winners – 2001, 2009, 2010
- Silver medalist of Ukraine among college competition – 2009, 2010
- European University Champions – 2009

== League and cup history ==
=== FC Ternopil Nyva-2 ===
Season	Division	Pos	P	W	D	L	F	A	Pts	Domestic Cup	Europe	Notes
2000–01	3rd "A"	11	30	8	7	15	26	52	31			
2001–02	3rd "A"	15	36	9	8	19	26	49	35			Withdrew (Note: After the winter break the club was renamed from Nyva Ternopil-2 to FC Ternopil. It was forced to withdraw after the season since the main team Nyva Ternopil relegated to the same level.)

=== FC Ternopil ===
Season	Division	Pos	P	W	D	L	F	A	Pts	Domestic Cup	Europe	Notes
2010	4th	1	8	7	1	0	19	4	22			
2010	4th	4	3	0	0	3	1	12	0			
2012	4th	5	10	3	0	7	8	5	9			
2012–13	3rd "A"	3	20	11	2	7	31	20	35	1/64 finals		
2012–13	3rd	4	30	15	4	11	43	34	49	1/64 finals		Group 1 - Stage 2
2013–14	3rd	3	36	20	11	5	56	27	71	1/4 finals		Promoted
2014–15	2nd	11	30	11	8	11	33	49	41	1/16 finals		
2015–16	2nd	15	30	6	7	17	18	47	22	1/8 finals		Avoided relegation; −3
2016–17	2nd	18	34	3	6	25	17	70	15	1/16 finals		Relegated
2017–18	3rd	–	~~4~~	~~0~~	~~0~~	~~4~~	~~2~~	~~9~~	~~0~~	1/64 finals		Withdrew (Note: Withdrew in the beginning of the season and its league results were annulled.)

=== FC Ternopil-DYuSSh ===
Season	Division	Pos	P	W	D	L	F	A	Pts	Domestic Cup	Europe	Notes
2018–19	4th	9_{/11}	18	2	1	15	11	55	7			

== Players ==
=== Current squad ===
Note: Flags indicate national team as defined under FIFA eligibility rules; some limited exceptions apply. Players may hold more than one non-FIFA nationality.

No.	Pos.	Nation	Player
1	GK	UKR	Volodymyr Kravchuk
71	GK	UKR	Vitaliy Myrnyi
4	DF	UKR	Ihor Nakonechnyi
5	DF	UKR	Stepan Klekot
7	DF	UKR	Ihor Kurylo
19	DF	UKR	Oleksiy Sheyko
23	DF	UKR	Vladyslav Hevlych
77	DF	UKR	Taras Chervonetskyi
9	MF	UKR	Pavlo Choromaz

No.	Pos.	Nation	Player
10	MF	UKR	Yaroslav Solonynko
11	MF	UKR	Serhiy Polyanchuk
17	MF	UKR	Vitaliy Bohdanov
20	MF	UKR	Ihor Vons
20	MF	UKR	Taras Hromyak
23	MF	UKR	Taras Kryvyi
25	MF	UKR	Yuri Sokolovskiy
14	FW	UKR	Andriy Riznyk
23	FW	UKR	Artur Dori

== Managers ==
- 2007-2016 Vasyl Ivehesh
- 2016 Ivan Marushchak
- 2016-2017 Vasyl Matviykiv (caretaker)
- 2017 Petr Badlo

== See also ==
- PFC Nyva Ternopil
- FC Chortkiv
- Ternopil City Stadium
- Ternopil Volodymyr Hnatyuk National Pedagogical University
