= Volodymyr Knysh =

Ukrainian footballer (born 1970)

Personal information
- Full name: Volodymyr Mykolayovych Knysh
- Date of birth: 24 December 1970 (age 55)
- Place of birth: Dnipropetrovsk, Ukrainian SSR
- Height: 1.84 m (6 ft 0 in)
- Position: Defender

Youth career
- Dnipropetrovsk Oblast boarding school
- 1989: Dnipro Dnipropetrovsk

Senior career*
Years	Team	Apps	(Gls)
1990–1991	Alga Bishkek	38	(0)
1992	Kryvbas Kryvyi Rih	27	(1)
1993–94	Veres Rivne	23	(1)

Managerial career
- 1995–1999: Dnipropetrovsk School of Physical Culture
- 1999–2000: Dnipro Dnipropetrovsk (assistant)
- 2004–2012: Dnipro (academy coach)
- 2012–2013: Academia Chișinău
- 2013–2014: Skala Stryi
- 2014: FC Olimpik Petrykivka
- 2015: Naftovyk-Ukrnafta Okhtyrka (assistant)
- 2015–2018: Naftovyk-Ukrnafta Okhtyrka
- 2018–2021: FC VPK-Ahro Shevchenkivka (assistant)
- 2021: Kryvbas Kryvyi Rih (assistant)
- 2022–: Polissya Zhytomyr (assistant)
- * Club domestic league appearances and goals

Volodymyr Knysh (Ukrainian: Володимир Миколайович Книш; born 24 December 1970 Dnipropetrovsk, Ukrainian SSR) is a former Soviet and Ukrainian footballer and Ukrainian football coach who managed Naftovyk-Ukrnafta Okhtyrka.
