= Vasyl Ivehesh =

Ukrainian footballer and coach

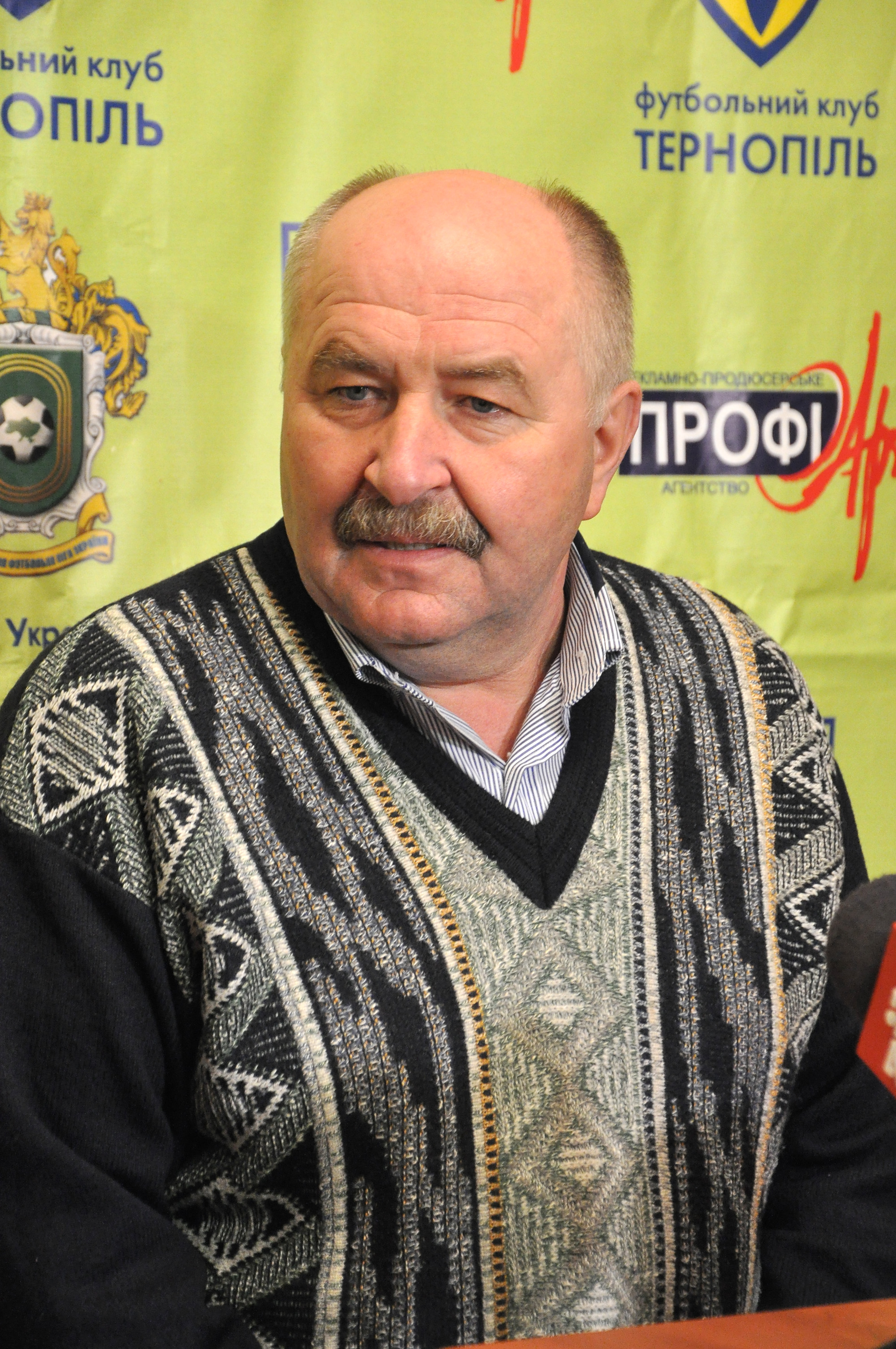

Personal information
- Full name: Vasyl Petrovych Ivehesh
- Date of birth: 3 March 1961 (age 65)
- Place of birth: Korolevo, Ukrainian SSR
- Position: Midfielder

Senior career*
Years	Team	Apps	(Gls)
- Nyva Pidhaitsi
- Zoria Khorostkiv
- Podillya Khmelnytskyi
- Nyva Ternopil
1990–1992	Dnister Zalishchyky		

Managerial career
- Dnister Zalishchyky
- Krystal Chortkiv
- Nadiya Nahiryanka
- 199?–2000: Postomicy (Czech Republic)
- 2000–200?: Pedlitsey Ternopil
- Burevisnyk Ternopil
- 2007–2016: Ternopil
- * Club domestic league appearances and goals

Vasyl Petrovych Ivehesh (Ukrainian: Василь Петрович Івегеш; born 3 March 1961) is a Ukrainian professional football coach and a former player.

Ivehesh became a manager for several amateur clubs after retiring as a player. From 2007 to 2016, he served as manager for FC Ternopil, earning promotion to the Ukrainian First League in 2014.
