= Ivan Marushchak =

Ukrainian football coach (born 1970)

Ivan Maruschak
Personal information
- Full name: Ivan Petrovych Maruschak
- Date of birth: 25 April 1970 (age 56)
- Place of birth: Horodok, Ternopil Oblast, Ukrainian SSR

Managerial career
- Years: Team
- 1997: Artek Yalta
- 1998: Mozdok
- 1999–2000: Orbita Krasnohvardiyske
- 2000–2002: Bospor Kerch
- 2002–2004: Tavriya-2 Simferopol
- 2004: Tavriya Simferopol (assistant)
- 2005: Yalos Yalta
- 2006–2008: Olkom Melitopol
- 2008: Knyazha-2 Shchaslyve
- 2009–2010: Feniks-Illichovets Kalinine
- 2010: Foros
- 2010: Feniks-Illichovets Kalinine
- 2010–2013: Zhemchuzhyna Yalta
- 2014: Zhemchuzhyna Yalta
- 2015: Ahro Synkiv
- 2016: Ternopil
- 2016: Ternopil (president)

Ivan Marushchak (Ukrainian: Іван Петрович Марущак; born 25 April 1970) is a Ukrainian football coach.

== Career ==
In 1988–90, he served in the Soviet Army, after which worked as a sports instructor in Chernivtsi. In 2003 while working in SC Tavriya Simferopol, Marushchak graduated the Moscow State Academy of Physical Culture and Sports.

In 2014, Marushchak ended up in a middle of political scandal connected with the annexation of Crimea by the Russian Federation when FC Zhemchuzhyna Yalta played couple of exhibition games with Russian FC Terek Grozny. After the annexation of Crimea Marushchak coached Zhemchuzhyna Yalta which competed in the 2014 Republican championship leading it at the first half.

In August 2014 Zhemchuzhyna Yalta coached by Marushchak started to play in the Russian Cup and the Russian Second League.

Marushchak is a non-partisan member of the Ternopil Oblast Council. In 2015, he served as the president of FC Ahro Synkiv and in 2016, he became the president of FC Ternopil.
