= Sergei Soldatov (footballer, born 1970) =

Ukrainian footballer and coach (born 1970)

Personal information
- Full name: Sergei Viktorovich Soldatov
- Date of birth: 12 October 1970 (age 56)
- Place of birth: Sochi, Russian SFSR
- Height: 1.76 m (5 ft 9 1/2 in)
- Position: Midfielder

Senior career*
Years	Team	Apps	(Gls)
1992	FC Arsenal Tula	2	(0)
1992	FC Torpedo Sochi	22	(3)
1992–1993	FC Dynamo-3 Kyiv	8	(0)
1993–1994	FC Transimpeks Vyshneve	7	(0)
1993–1994	FC Slavutych	7	(0)
1995	FC Lada-Togliatti	21	(2)
1995	FC Lada-2 Togliatti	5	(1)
1996	FC Zhemchuzhina-2 Sochi	30	(1)
1997–1998	FC Energia Chaikovskiy	51	(2)
1999–2002	FC Metallurg-ZAPSIB Novokuznetsk	110	(12)
2002–2003	FC Dnipro Kyiv	18	(2)

Managerial career
- 2003–2012: Sports School Zmina Kyiv (staff)
- 2013–2016: FC Obolon-Brovar Kyiv
- * Club domestic league appearances and goals

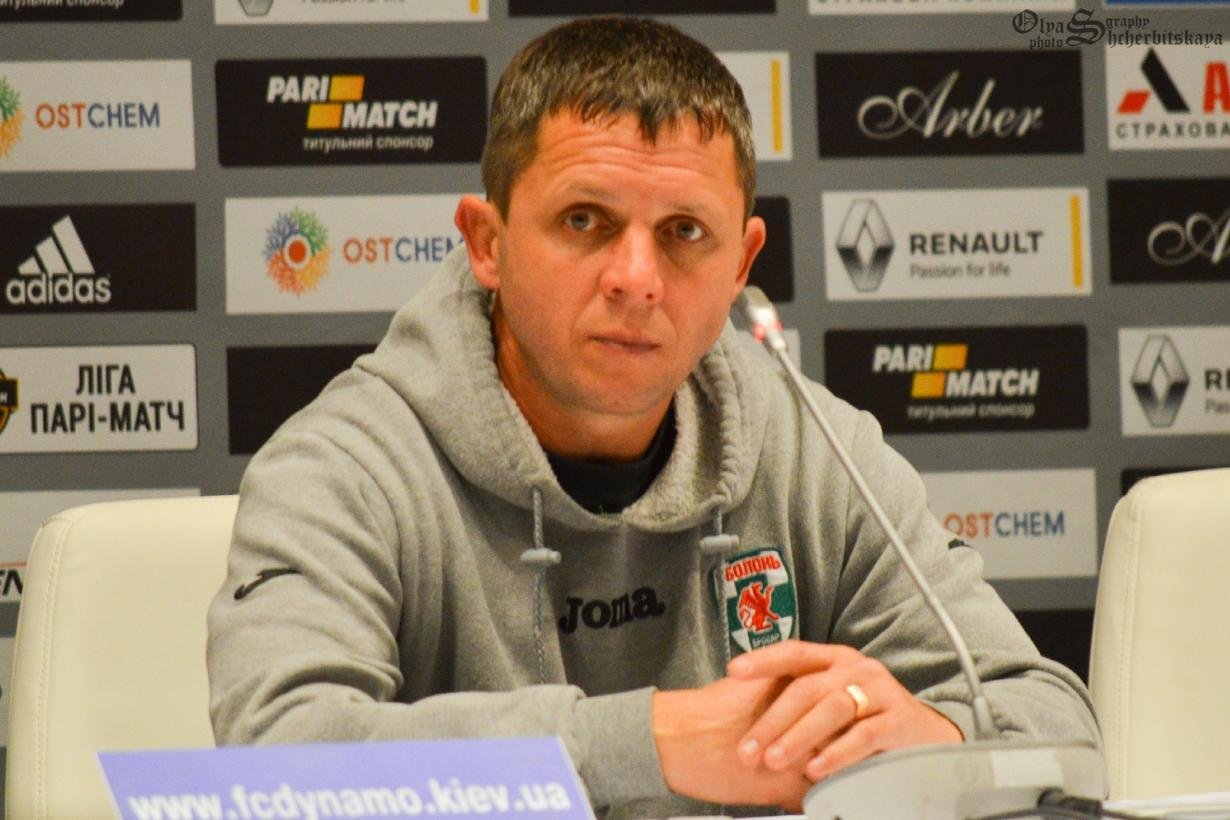
Match "Dynamo" - October 27, 2015

Sergei Soldatov (Russian: Сергей Викторович Солдатов; born 12 October 1970) is a former footballer and current football coach.

== Career ==
He worked as a coach for FC Obolon Kyiv and FC Obolon-Brovar Kyiv academy known as Sports School Zmina Kyiv.
