= Petro Badlo =

Ukrainian association football player

Personal information
- Full name: Petro Klymentiyovych Badlo
- Date of birth: 24 May 1976 (age 50)
- Place of birth: Tovste, Ukrainian SSR
- Height: 1.78 m (5 ft 10 in)
- Position: Defender

Senior career*
Years	Team	Apps	(Gls)
–1994	Dnister Zalishchyky	24	(5)
1995–1996	Krystal Chortkiv	26	(1)
1996–1997	Pokuttia Kolomyia	14	(2)
1997–1998	Krystal Chortkiv	40	(0)
1998	Nyva Ternopil	0	(0)
1999–2006	Tobol	206	(17)
2007–2014	Aktobe	167	(9)
2016–2017	Nyva Ternopil	10	(0)

Managerial career
- 2015–2017: Nyva Ternopil
- 2017: Ternopil
- 2022: Aktobe
- * Club domestic league appearances and goals

Petro Klymentiyovych Badlo (Ukrainian: Петро Климентійович Бадло; born 24 May 1976) is a Ukrainian football manager and former footballer.

== Playing career ==
=== Beginnings in Ukraine ===
Badlo began his career in his home country of Ukraine and, at the age of 16, he debuted in the Ukrainian Second League (the third tier) for Dnister (Zalishchyky). In 1995, Badlo made the step up to the Ukrainian First League (the second tier) when he signed for Krystal (Chortkiv). In 1996, Badlo signed for Ukrainian Second League club Pokuttia, where he made 14 league appearances and scored 2 goals. In 1998, Badlo made the step up to the Ukrainian Premier League (the highest football league in Ukraine) when he signed for Nyva (Ternopil).

=== Successes in Kazakhstan ===
In 1999 season, Badlo signed for Kazakhstani team Tobol and began a successful spell in the Kazakhstan Premier League. After seven years with Tobol, Balbdo signed for another Kazakhstani top flight team – Aktobe. Over the next three seasons, he helped them to three consecutive league titles in 2007, 2008, 2009. Aktobe were also successful in the 2008 Kazakhstan Cup and competed in the qualifying stages for the UEFA Champions League by virtue of their league success.

In 2016, Badlo returned to Ukrainian and to Nyva (Ternopil) who, by this point, were playing in the Ukrainian Amateur Football Championship (the fourth tier).

== Managerial career ==
In 2015, Badlo was appointed manager of Nyva (Ternopil) in the Ukrainian second tier. In 2017, he was appointed manager of Ukrainian third-tier side Ternopil. In 2022, he was appointed as the caretaker manager of Aktobe in the Kazakhstani top flight – the Kazakhstan Premier League.
