= Anatoliy Bezsmertnyi =

Ukrainian footballer (born 1969)

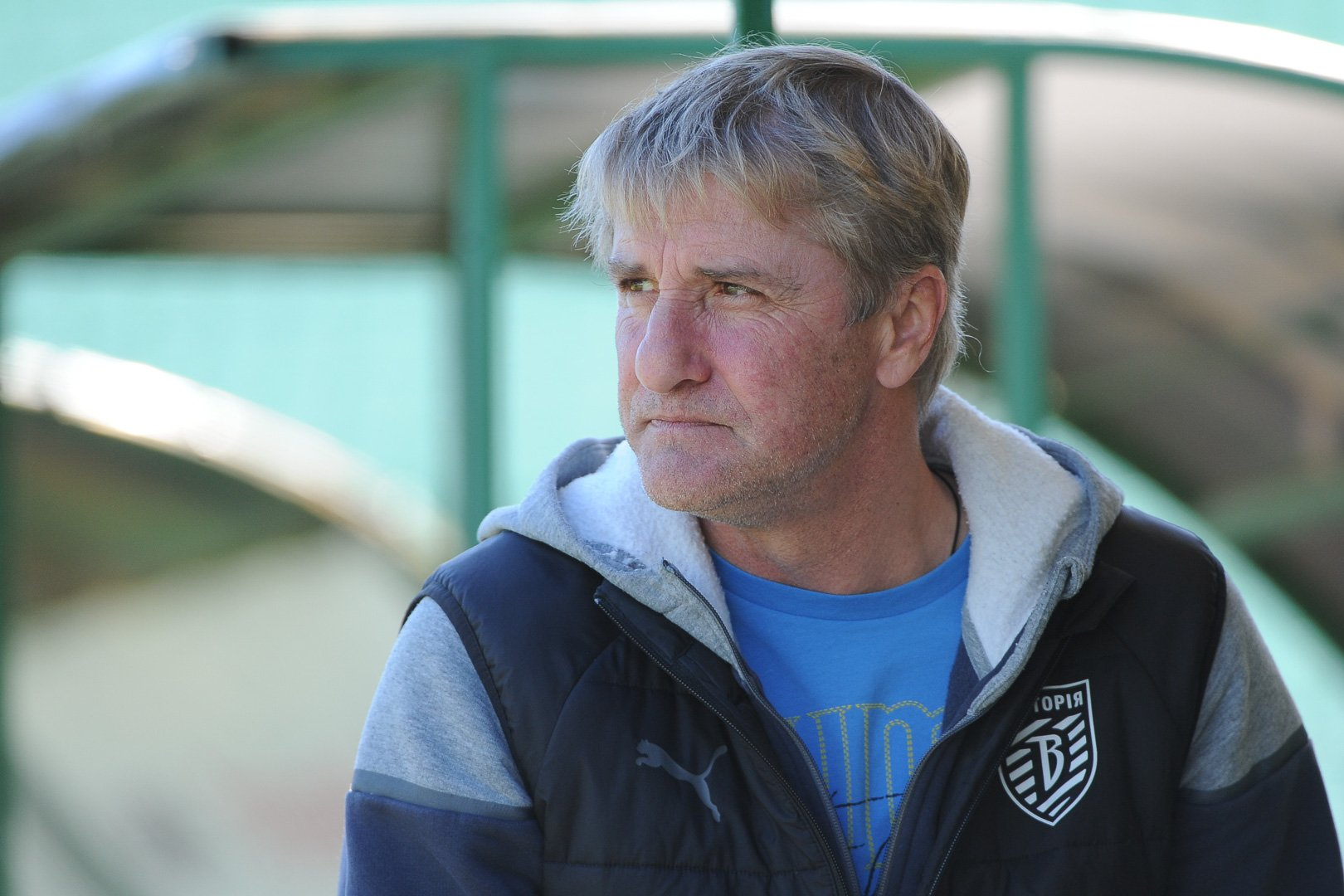

Personal information
- Full name: Anatoliy Petrovych Bezsmertnyi
- Date of birth: 21 January 1969 (age 57)
- Place of birth: Kyiv, Soviet Union
- Height: 1.82 m (6 ft 0 in)
- Positions: Defender; midfielder

Team information
- Current team: Dynamo Kyiv (assistant)

Youth career
- Dynamo Kyiv

Senior career*
Years	Team	Apps	(Gls)
1987	Tavriya Simferopol	14	(0)
1988–1990	Halychyna Drohobych (SKA Lvov)	38	(0)
1991	Pryladyst Mukacheve	40	(0)
1991–1993	Dynamo Kyiv	31	(0)
1992–1994	→ Dynamo-2 Kyiv (loan)	16	(0)
1994–1997	FC Tyumen	109	(4)
1998–2001	Rostselmash Rostov-on-Don	100	(4)
1999–2000	→ Rostselmash-2 Rostov-on-Don (loan)	5	(0)
2002	Chernomorets Novorossiysk	23	(0)
2003–2004	Dynamo Stavropol	49	(0)
2005	Metalist-UHMK Kyiv	3	(0)
2005–2007	Dnipro Cherkasy	31	(0)
2008–2009	Irpin Horenychi	8	(0)
Total		450	(8)

Managerial career
- 2008–2009: Dnipro Cherkasy
- 2010–2013: Poltava
- 2015–2016: Poltava
- 2017: Sumy
- 2017–2018: Poltava
- 2018–2020: Polissya Zhytomyr
- 2020: Cherkashchyna
- 2021: Lviv
- 2021–2022: Viktoriya Mykolaivka
- 2022: Alians Lypova Dolyna
- 2023: Lviv
- 2023–2026: Viktoriya Sumy
- * Club domestic league appearances and goals

Anatoliy Petrovych Bezsmertnyi (Ukrainian: Анатолій Петрович Безсмертний; born 21 January 1969) is a Ukrainian professional football manager and former player. He is currently an assistant coach of Ukrainian Premier League club Dynamo Kyiv.

== Career ==
Bezsmertnyi started playing football at the Dynamo sports school of Olympic Reserve, and his first coach was Volodymyr Onyshchenko.

He made his professional debut in the Soviet Second League in 1987 for SC Tavriya Simferopol. In 1988 he was drafted to military service and spent couple of seasons playing for a sports company of SKA Lvov in competitions for armed forces and later at professional level for its descendant Halychyna Drohobych.

After his military service, Bezsmertnyi spent a season in neighboring Zakarpattia playing for a Mukachevo team. At the end of 1991 with a help of the Zakarpattia native and Dynamo's veteran Mykhailo Koman, he returned to Dynamo Kyiv.

While being a manager of Dnipro Cherkasy in 2008–09 season, Bezsmertnyi played couple of seasons in the national Amateur League for a veteran team Irpin Horenychi from Kyiv suburbs. He won the 2008 Ukrainian Amateur Cup with club by defeating Halychyna Lviv in the final.

As part of the FC Poltava coaching staff, at age 45 Bezsmertnyi also played for another Kyivan veteran team "Yevrobis-Ahrobiznes", which competed in the 2014 Ukrainian Amateur Cup in one game against ODEK Orzhiv at the CSK ZSU Stadium.

== Honours ==
Dynamo Kyiv

- Ukrainian Premier League: 1993; runner-up 1992

Irpin Horenychi

- Ukrainian Amateur Cup: 2008

Individual

- Russian Second Division Zone South best defender: 2004
