= Serhiy Syzykhin =

Ukrainian footballer and coach

Personal information
- Full name: Serhiy Valeriyovych Syzykhin
- Date of birth: 2 March 1980 (age 46)
- Place of birth: Zhdanov, Ukrainian SSR
- Position: Midfielder

Youth career
- ????–1997: Bubka College of Olympic Reserve

Senior career*
| Years | Team | Apps | (Gls) |
| 1999–2001 | Mashynobudivnyk Druzhkivka | 33 | (0) |
| 2001–2002 | Metalurh Donetsk | 0 | (0) |
| 2001–2002 | Metalurh-2 Donetsk | 25 | (2) |
| 2002 | Spartak Sumy | 2 | (0) |
| 2003–2004 | Zakarpattia Uzhhorod | 35 | (1) |
| 2004–2005 | Stal Dniprodzerzhynsk | 37 | (1) |
| 2006 | Banants Yerevan | 13 | (3) |
| 2006–2008 | Helios Kharkiv | 57 | (0) |
| 2008–2009 | Dnipro Cherkasy | 21 | (0) |

Managerial career
- 2012–2015: Helios Kharkiv (academy)
- 2015: Helios Kharkiv (caretaker)
- 2015–2017: Helios Kharkiv
- * Club domestic league appearances and goals

Serhiy Syzykhin (Ukrainian: Сергiй Валерiйович Сизихiн; born 2 March 1980) is a former Ukrainian footballer and football coach.
