= FC Poltava =

- Full name: FC Poltava
- Founded: June 5, 2007
- Dissolved: June 21, 2018
- Ground: Lokomotiv Stadium
- Capacity: 2,500
- Chairman: Leonid Sobolev
- League: defunct
- 2017–18: First League, 2nd (promotion via play-offs)

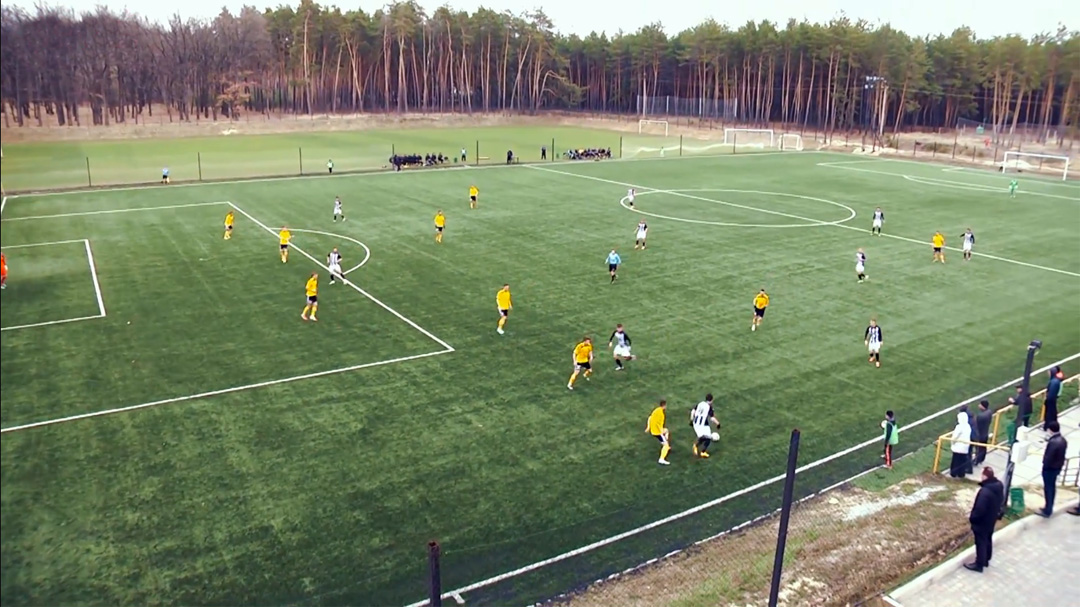
FC Poltava training base in Kopyly

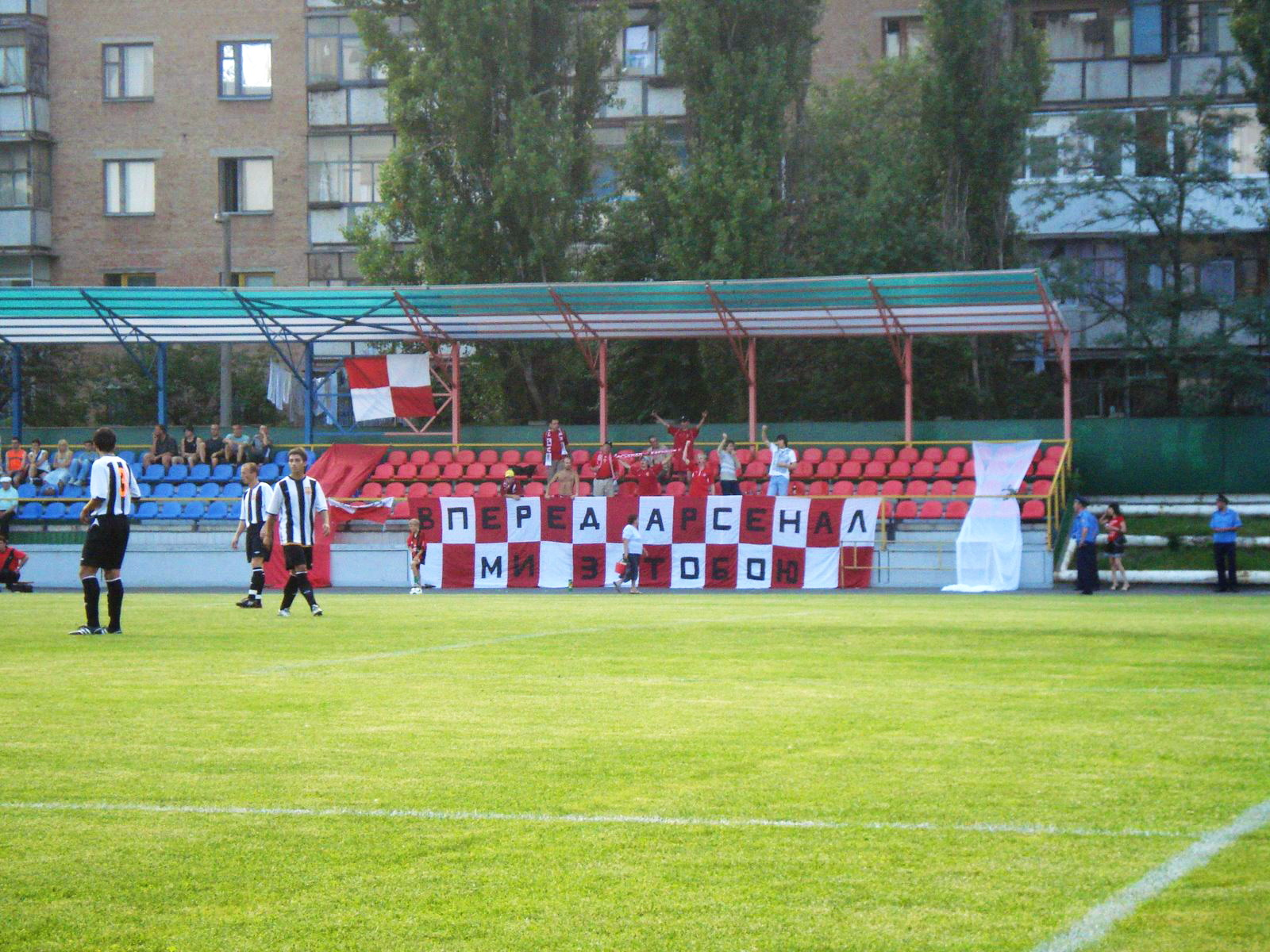
Lokomotyv Stadium during the game between Arsenal Kharkiv and FC Poltava

FC Poltava (Ukrainian: ФК Полтава) was a Ukrainian football club based in Poltava in 2007–2018.

== History ==
The club was created by the newly elected mayor of Poltava city, Andriy Matkovsky (2006–2010), who became the club's Honorary President, while the main sponsor and president was Leonid Sobolev.

FC Poltava entered the professional leagues for the 2007–08 season in the Druha Liha B without playing a single game at amateur level. The first coach of the main team was Oleksandr Omelchuk, who previously coached FC Vorskla-2 Poltava. FC Poltava started the season terribly, but in the second half they improved a great deal.

The team's goal was to train players for the teams of the Premier League and First League. The club also had intentions to reestablish the forgotten Poltava derby that in the Soviet times took place between teams of Kolhospnyk (today's Vorskla) and Lokomotyv. FC Poltava reached an agreement of cooperation with the local DYuSSh (sports school) imeni Horpynka as their supporting academy. Already in summer of 2010 the club announced of its withdrawal from the professional football due to a biased attitude from the PFL of Ukraine, particularly its refereeing. After some talks with several state officials and from Ministry of sport a consensus was found. It was decided that the club would continue its participation in the Second League.

The home uniform was dark green.

On 21 June 2018, it was announced that FC Poltava was dissolved.

== Honours ==
- Ukrainian First League
  - Runners-up (1): 2017–18
- Ukrainian Second League
  - Winners (1): 2011–12
  - Runners-up (2): 2008–09, 2010–11

== List of head coaches ==
- 2007–2009: Oleksandr Omelchuk
- 2009–2010: Ivan Shariy (caretaker)
- 2010–2010: Yuriy Malyhin
- 2010–2013: Anatoliy Bezsmertnyi
- 2013–2015: Ilya Blyznyuk
- 2015: Oleh Fedorchuk
- 2015–2016 Anatoliy Bezsmertnyi
- 2016: Andriy Zavyalov (caretaker)
- 2016–2017: Yuriy Yaroshenko
- 2017: Volodymyr Prokopinenko
- 2017–2018: Anatoliy Bezsmertnyi

== League and cup history ==
Emblem before 2012

Season	Div.	Pos.	Pl.	W	D	L	GS	GA	P	Domestic Cup	Europe	Notes
2007–08	3rd "B"	11	34	11	10	13	36	51	43	Did not enter		
2008–09	3rd "B"	2	34	21	9	4	52	23	72	1/32 finals		
2009–10	3rd "B"	3	26	16	6	4	34	16	54	1/16 finals		
2010–11	3rd "B"	2	22	15	3	4	41	24	48	1/8 finals		
2011–12	3rd "B"	1	26	18	5	3	50	18	59	1/16 finals		Promoted
2012–13	2nd	13	34	11	12	11	35	35	45	1/32 finals		
2013–14	2nd	4	30	14	4	12	36	34	46	1/16 finals		
2014–15	2nd	10	30	11	9	10	29	27	42	1/8 finals		
2015–16	2nd	10	30	10	8	12	29	32	38	1/32 finals		
2016–17	2nd	12	34	13	4	17	33	43	40	1/4 finals		−3
2017–18	2nd	2	34	23	3	8	56	26	72	1/32 finals		Promoted
2018–19	before the start of the season withdrew and dissolved											
