= FC Skala Stryi (2004) =

Skala Stryi
- Full name: FC Skala Stryi
- Founded: 2004 (crest year 1911) (Note: traditional foundation year of FC Skala Stryi)
- Ground: Medyk Stadium, Morshyn; Sokil Stadium, Stryi
- Capacity: 812; 6,000
- Chairman: Mykola Kmit
- League: Ukrainian Second League
- 2016–17: First League, 17th (relegated)

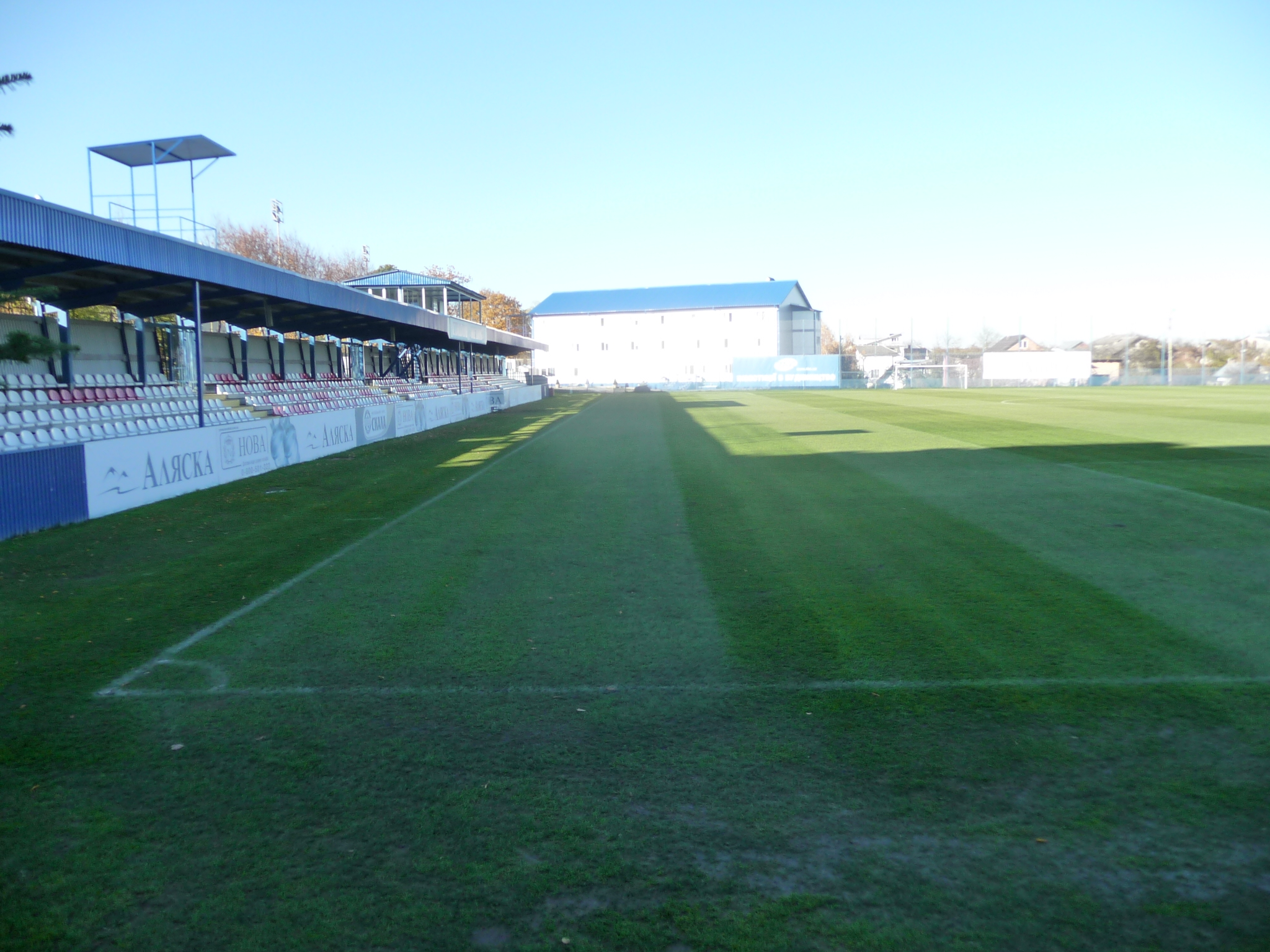
Medyk Stadium in Morshyn

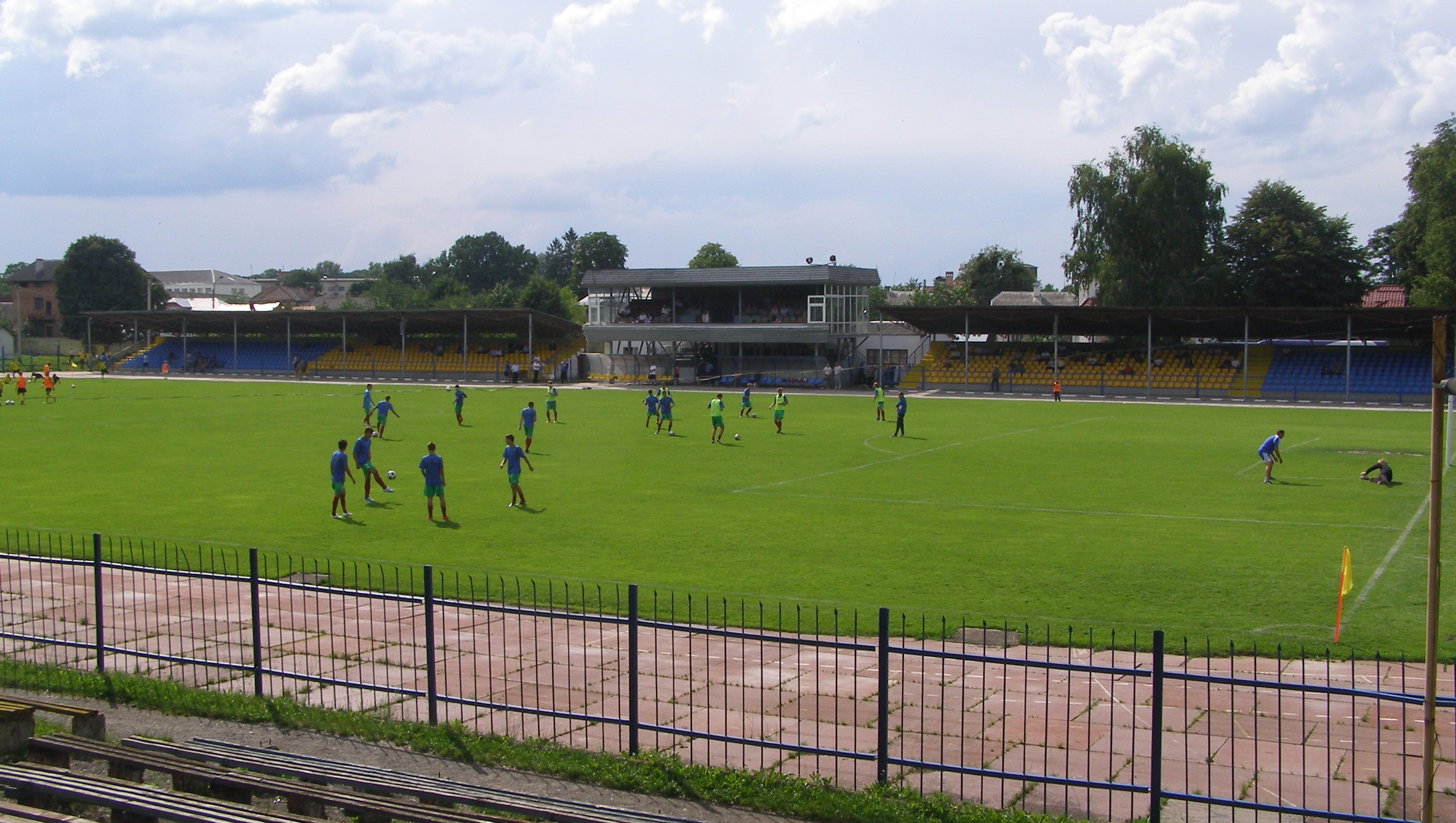
Sokil Stadium in Stryi

FC Skala Stryi was a Ukrainian football professional team from Stryi in Lviv oblast. It used to play at Medyk Stadium in Morshyn that previously belonged to former FC Medyk Morshyn. On 9 July 2018 the Professional Football League of Ukraine confirmed that the club withdrew from competition.

It is the fourth reincarnation of Ukrainian sports club that existed in Austria-Hungary (Kingdom of Galicia and Lodomeria) in 1911.

== History ==
=== Name changes ===
- 2004–2009 FC Morshyn
- 2010 FC Skala Morshyn
- 2011–2018 FC Skala Stryi

=== Club's history ===
Besides Mykola Kmit, the initiative to create the club also came from a member of the Board of Directors of IDS Group, Vsevolod Bilas, and the president of the Georgian FC Gagra, Beso Chikhradze.

In 2004-2009, the club was competing in the Ukrainian Youth Football League as a youth football club FC Morshyn. At the same time, another club, FC Hazovyk-Skala Stryi, represented the neighboring city of Stryi in the Ukrainian First League. In 2006, Hazovyk-Skala was reorganized as FC Lviv and moved to Lviv. In 2009 FC Morshyn entered the professional ranks with their first game played as a friendly against FC Lviv. During the 2009–10 winter break it renamed itself to FC Skala Morshyn, while playing in Stryi.

On 10 February 2011 the club was renamed again to FC Skala Stryi due to the fact that it was playing in Stryi.

On 19 June 2018, the club's president Mykola Kmyt announced that his club will withdraw from competition if the club will not find new owners. Several days before, the club's general director Luis Esmi commented on the withdrawal of Skala Stryi. He explained that the club requested clarification from the Football Federation of Ukraine (FFU) on the situation regarding fixed matches and information regarding punishment for the guilty. The federation was accusing the club of match-fixing. Esmi confirmed that the club released all its players. He also stated that the club will certainly withdraw if the federation establishes that their players were involved in match-fixing, and will think about whether or not to participate if other clubs were involved but no one would get punished.

On 14 June 2018, the club expressed its intentions to merge its football academy with the academy of FC Volyn Lutsk.

== League and cup history ==
Season	Div.	Pos.	Pl.	W	D	L	GS	GA	P	Domestic Cup	Other		Notes
FC Morshyn
2009	4th "1"	4	8	1	1	6	12	23	4				
Skala Morshyn
2009–10	3rd "A"	11	20	1	3	16	11	40	6	1/32 finals	PFL LC	Group Stage	
Skala Stryi
2010–11	3rd "A"	7	22	10	5	7	26	19	35	1/32 finals			moved to Stryi
2011–12	3rd "A"	9	26	8	4	14	26	36	28	1/32 finals			
2012–13	3rd "A"	5	20	9	6	5	19	15	33	1/64 finals			
2012–13	3rd "1"	5	30	10	7	13	25	41	37	1/64 finals			Stage 2
2013–14	3rd	18	35	8	3	24	22	57	27	1/32 finals			
2014–15	3rd	5	27	11	5	11	29	34	38	1/32 finals			
2015–16	3rd	5	26	13	7	6	41	23	46	1/32 finals			Promoted
2016–17	2nd	17	34	5	5	24	25	58	20	1/32 finals			Relegated
2017–18	3rd	4	27	12	4	11	29	29	40	Withdrew			Withdrew

== Managers ==
- 2009–2010: Oleksandr Tomakh
- 2011–2013: Volodymyr Reva
- 2013–2014: Volodymyr Knysh
- 2014–2017: Vasyl Malyk
- 2017–2018: Roman Hnativ

== Former players ==
- (Ukraine) Nazar Kmit – made over 100 league appearances

== Former emblems ==
Emblem 2010–12

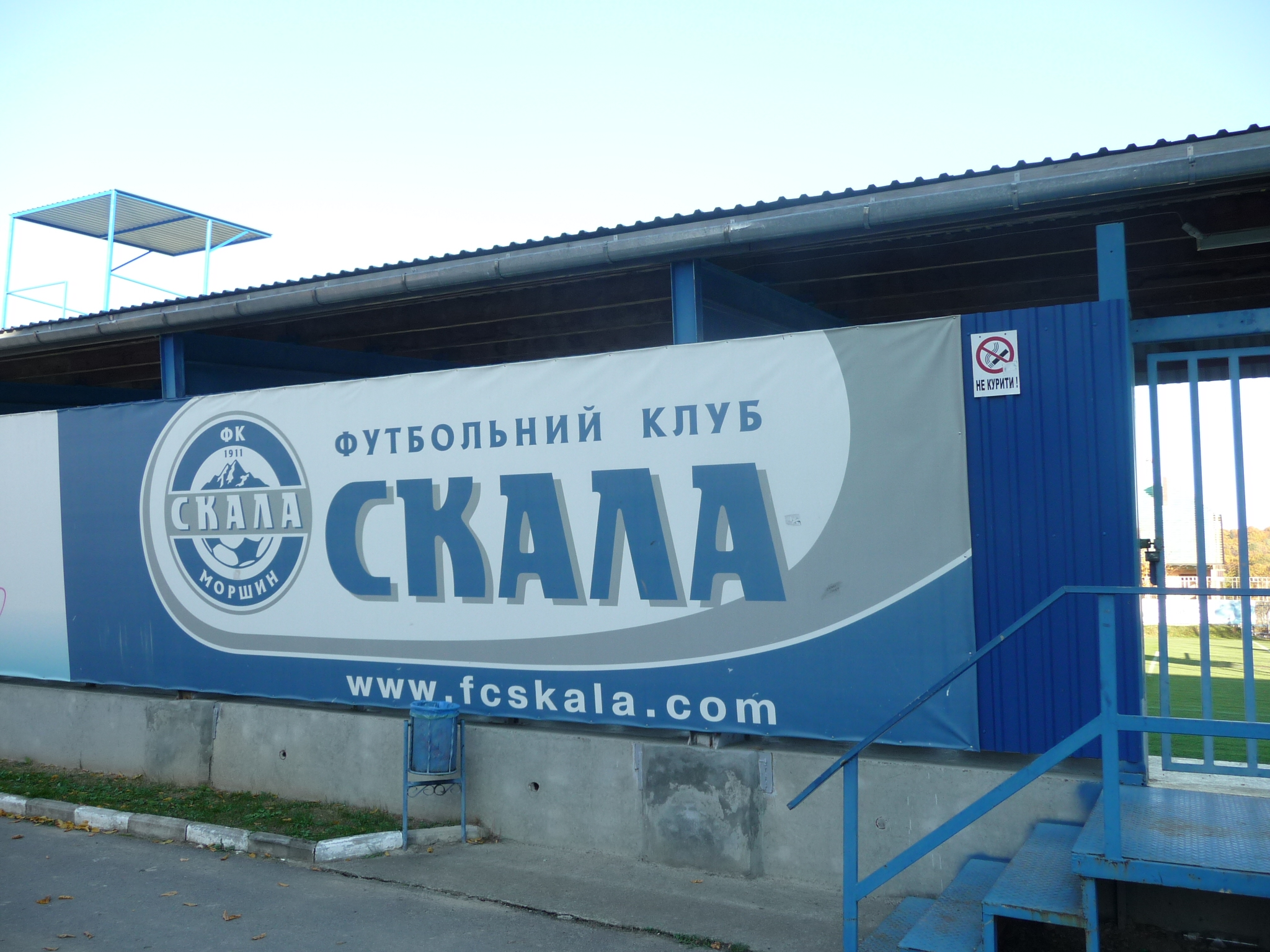
Skala Morshyn banner at the Medyk Stadium

Emblem before 2010

== See also ==
- FC Gagra
- FC Medyk Morshyn
- FC Avanhard Zhydachiv
- FC Skala Stryi
