= 2019–20 in Ukrainian football =

Football in Ukraine
- Season: 2019–20

Men's football
- Premier League: Shakhtar Donetsk
- First League: FC Mynai
- Second League: Nyva Ternopil (Group A); VPK-Ahro (Group B)
- Amateur League: Viktoriya Mykolaivka
- Cup: Dynamo Kyiv
- Amateur Cup: Olimpiya Savyntsi
- Super Cup: Dynamo Kyiv

Women's football
- Vyshcha Liha: Zhytlobud-2 Kharkiv
- Persha Liha: Karpaty Lviv (Group A); Spartak-Orion (Group B)
- Women's Cup: Zhytlobud-2 Kharkiv

The 2019–20 season was the 29th season of competitive association football in Ukraine since dissolution of the Soviet Union.

== National teams ==
=== Ukraine national football team ===
==== Results and fixtures ====
| 7 September 2019 UEFA Euro 2020 qualifying Group B | Lithuania | 0–3 | Ukraine | Vilnius, Lithuania |
| 18:00 (19:00 UTC+3) | | [Report (UAF)] [Report (LFF)] | Zinchenko 7'; Marlos 27'; Malinovskyi 62' | Stadium: LFF Stadium; Referee: Irfan Peljto (Bosnia and Herzegovina) |

| 10 September 2019 Friendly | Ukraine | 2–2 | Nigeria | Dnipro, Ukraine |
| 20:30 | Zinchenko 78'; Yaremchuk 79' | [Report (UAF)] [Report ()] | Aribo 4'; Osimhen 34' (pen.) | Stadium: Dnipro-Arena; Referee: Paolo Valeri (Italy) |

| 11 October 2019 UEFA Euro 2020 qualifying Group B | Ukraine | 2–0 | Lithuania | Kharkiv, Ukraine |
| 20:45 (21:45 UTC+3) | Malinovskyi 29', 58' | [Report (UAF)] [Report (LFF)] | | Stadium: Metalist Stadium; Referee: Harald Lechner (Austria) |

| 14 October 2019 UEFA Euro 2020 qualifying Group B | Ukraine | 2–1 | Portugal | Kyiv, Ukraine |
| 20:45 (21:45 UTC+3) | Yaremchuk 6'; Yarmolenko 27' | [Report (UAF)] [Report (FPF)] | Ronaldo 72' (pen.) | Stadium: NSK Olimpiyskiy; Attendance: 65,883; Referee: Anthony Taylor (England) |

| 14 November 2019 Friendly | Ukraine | 1–0 | Estonia | Zaporizhzhia, Ukraine |
| 19:00 (UTC+2) | Bezus 92+2' | [Report (UAF)] [Report ()] | | Stadium: Slavutych-Arena; Referee: Juan Martínez Munuera (Spain) |

| 17 November 2019 UEFA Euro 2020 qualifying Group B | Serbia | 2–2 | Ukraine | Belgrade, Serbia |
| 15:00 (16:00 UTC+3) | Tadić 9' (pen.); Mitrović 56' | [Report (UAF)] [Report (FSS)] | Yaremchuk 33'; Besyedin 90+3' | Stadium: Red Star Stadium; Referee: Bobby Madden (Scotland) |

| 27 March 2020 Friendly | France | postponed | Ukraine | Paris, France |
| | | Report | | Stadium: Stade de France |

| 31 March 2020 Friendly | Poland | postponed | Ukraine | Chorzów, Poland |
| | | Report | | Stadium: Silesian Stadium |

| 26 May 2020 Friendly | Ukraine | postponed | Cyprus | Kharkiv, Ukraine |
| | | Report | | Stadium: Metalist Stadium |

| 2 June 2020 Friendly | Ukraine | postponed | Northern Ireland | Kyiv, Ukraine |
| | | Report | | Stadium: NSK Olimpiyskiy |

| 7 June 2020 Friendly | Ukraine | postponed | Israel | Lviv, Ukraine |
| | | Report | | Stadium: Arena Lviv |

=== Ukraine U-21 national football team ===
==== 2021 UEFA European Under-21 Championship ====
===== 2021 UEFA European Under-21 Championship qualification =====
====== Group 8 ======
| Pos | Team | Pld | W | D | L | GF | GA | GD | Pts | Qualification | Denmark | Romania | Ukraine | Finland | | Malta |
|---|---|---|---|---|---|---|---|---|---|---|---|---|---|---|---|---|
| 1 | Denmark | 10 | 8 | 2 | 0 | 21 | 9 | +12 | 26 | Final tournament | — | 2–1 | 1–1 | 2–1 | 2–1 | 5–1 |
| 2 | Romania | 10 | 6 | 2 | 2 | 22 | 7 | +15 | 20 | Final tournament | 1–1 | — | 3–0 | 4–1 | 3–0 | 4–1 |
| 3 | Ukraine | 10 | 5 | 1 | 4 | 17 | 11 | +6 | 16 | | 2–3 | 1–0 | — | 0–2 | 3–0 | 4–0 |
| 4 | Finland | 10 | 4 | 1 | 5 | 14 | 15 | −1 | 13 | | 0–1 | 1–3 | 0–2 | — | 1–1 | 4–0 |
| 5 | Northern Ireland | 10 | 2 | 3 | 5 | 7 | 13 | −6 | 9 | | 0–1 | 0–0 | 1–0 | 2–3 | — | 0–0 |
| 6 | Malta | 10 | 0 | 1 | 9 | 4 | 30 | −26 | 1 | | 1–3 | 0–3 | 1–4 | 0–1 | 0–2 | — |

Source: UEFA

=== Ukraine women's national football team ===
==== Results and fixtures ====
===== 2021 UEFA Women's Euro qualifying =====
====== Group I ======
| Pos | Team | Pld | W | D | L | GF | GA | GD | Pts | Qualification | Germany | Ukraine | Ireland | Greece | Montenegro |
|---|---|---|---|---|---|---|---|---|---|---|---|---|---|---|---|
| 1 | Germany | 8 | 8 | 0 | 0 | 46 | 1 | +45 | 24 | Final tournament | — | 8–0 | 3–0 | 6–0 | 10–0 |
| 2 | Ukraine | 8 | 5 | 0 | 3 | 16 | 21 | −5 | 15 | Play-offs | 0–8 | — | 1–0 | 4–0 | 2–1 |
| 3 | Republic of Ireland | 8 | 4 | 1 | 3 | 11 | 10 | +1 | 13 | | 1–3 | 3–2 | — | 1–0 | 2–0 |
| 4 | Greece | 8 | 2 | 1 | 5 | 6 | 21 | −15 | 7 | | 0–5 | 0–4 | 1–1 | — | 1–0 |
| 5 | Montenegro | 8 | 0 | 0 | 8 | 2 | 28 | −26 | 0 | | 0–3 | 1–3 | 0–3 | 0–4 | — |

Source: UEFA

| 3 September 2019 | Ukraine | 0–8 | Germany | Arena Lviv, Lviv |
| 16:00 (17:00 EEST) | | Report | Däbritz 5', 80', 88'; Magull 29'; Rauch 32'; Oberdorf 54'; Huth 85'; Maier 90+2' | Attendance: 1,000; Referee: Tess Olofsson (Sweden) |

| 5 October 2019 | Germany | v | Ukraine | New Tivoli, Aachen |
| 14:00 | | Report |

| 8 October 2019 | Republic of Ireland | v | Ukraine | Tallaght Stadium, Dublin |
| (IST) | | Report |

| 10 April 2020 | Montenegro | v | Ukraine |
| | | Report |

| 14 April 2020 | Ukraine | v | Greece |
| (EEST) | | Report |

| 5 June 2020 | Ukraine | v | Republic of Ireland |
| (EEST) | | Report |

| 9 June 2020 | Greece | v | Ukraine |
| (EEST) | | Report |

== UEFA competitions ==
=== UEFA Champions League ===
==== Qualifying phase and play-off round ====
===== Third qualifying round =====
| Team 1 | Agg. | Team 2 | 1st leg | 2nd leg |
|---|---|---|---|---|
| Club Brugge (Belgium) | 4–3 | (Ukraine) Dynamo Kyiv | 1–0 | 3–3 |

===== Group C =====
| Pos | Team | Pld | W | D | L | GF | GA | GD | Pts | Qualification | MCI | ATA | SHK | DZG |
|---|---|---|---|---|---|---|---|---|---|---|---|---|---|---|
| 1 | (England) Manchester City | 6 | 4 | 2 | 0 | 16 | 4 | +12 | 14 | Advance to knockout phase | — | 5–1 | 1–1 | 2–0 |
| 2 | (Italy) Atalanta | 6 | 2 | 1 | 3 | 8 | 12 | −4 | 7 | Advance to knockout phase | 1–1 | — | 1–2 | 2–0 |
| 3 | (Ukraine) Shakhtar Donetsk | 6 | 1 | 3 | 2 | 8 | 13 | −5 | 6 | Transfer to Europa League | 0–3 | 0–3 | — | 2–2 |
| 4 | (Croatia) Dinamo Zagreb | 6 | 1 | 2 | 3 | 10 | 13 | −3 | 5 | | 1–4 | 4–0 | 3–3 | — |

Source: UEFA

=== UEFA Europa League ===
==== Second qualifying round ====
| Team 1 | Agg. | Team 2 | 1st leg | 2nd leg |
|---|---|---|---|---|
| Budućnost Podgorica (Montenegro) | 1–4 | (Ukraine) Zorya Luhansk | 1–3 | 0–1 |

==== Third qualifying round ====
| Team 1 | Agg. | Team 2 | 1st leg | 2nd leg |
|---|---|---|---|---|
| Mariupol (Ukraine) | 0–4 | (Netherlands) AZ | 0–0 | 0–4 |
| CSKA Sofia (Bulgaria) | 1–2 | (Ukraine) Zorya Luhansk | 1–1 | 0–1 |

==== Play-off round ====
| Team 1 | Agg. | Team 2 | 1st leg | 2nd leg |
|---|---|---|---|---|
| Espanyol (Spain) | 5–3 | (Ukraine) Zorya Luhansk | 3–1 | 2–2 |

==== Group stage ====
===== Group B =====
| Pos | Team | Pld | W | D | L | GF | GA | GD | Pts | Qualification | MAL | KOB | DKV | LUG |
|---|---|---|---|---|---|---|---|---|---|---|---|---|---|---|
| 1 | (Sweden) Malmö FF | 6 | 3 | 2 | 1 | 8 | 6 | +2 | 11 | Advance to knockout phase | — | 1–1 | 4–3 | 2–1 |
| 2 | (Denmark) Copenhagen | 6 | 2 | 3 | 1 | 5 | 4 | +1 | 9 | Advance to knockout phase | 0–1 | — | 1–1 | 1–0 |
| 3 | (Ukraine) Dynamo Kyiv | 6 | 1 | 4 | 1 | 7 | 7 | 0 | 7 | | 1–0 | 1–1 | — | 1–1 |
| 4 | (Switzerland) Lugano | 6 | 0 | 3 | 3 | 2 | 5 | −3 | 3 | | 0–0 | 0–1 | 0–0 | — |

Source: UEFA
Rules for classification: Group stage tiebreakers

===== Group I =====
| Pos | Team | Pld | W | D | L | GF | GA | GD | Pts | Qualification | GNT | WLF | STE | OLE |
|---|---|---|---|---|---|---|---|---|---|---|---|---|---|---|
| 1 | (Belgium) Gent | 6 | 3 | 3 | 0 | 11 | 7 | +4 | 12 | Advance to knockout phase | — | 2–2 | 3–2 | 2–1 |
| 2 | (Germany) VfL Wolfsburg | 6 | 3 | 2 | 1 | 9 | 7 | +2 | 11 | Advance to knockout phase | 1–3 | — | 1–0 | 3–1 |
| 3 | (France) Saint-Étienne | 6 | 0 | 4 | 2 | 6 | 8 | −2 | 4 | | 0–0 | 1–1 | — | 1–1 |
| 4 | (Ukraine) Oleksandriya | 6 | 0 | 3 | 3 | 6 | 10 | −4 | 3 | | 1–1 | 0–1 | 2–2 | — |

Source: UEFA
Rules for classification: Group stage tiebreakers

==== Knockout phase ====
===== Round of 32 =====
| Team 1 | Agg. | Team 2 | 1st leg | 2nd leg |
|---|---|---|---|---|
| Shakhtar Donetsk (Ukraine) | 5–4 | (Portugal) Benfica | 2–1 | 3–3 |

===== Round of 16 =====
| Team 1 | Agg. | Team 2 | 1st leg | 2nd leg |
|---|---|---|---|---|
| VfL Wolfsburg (Germany) | 1–5 | (Ukraine) Shakhtar Donetsk | 1–2 | 0–3 |

===== Quarter-finals =====
| Team 1 | Score | Team 2 |
|---|---|---|
| Shakhtar Donetsk (Ukraine) | 4–1 | (Switzerland) Basel |

===== Semi-finals =====
| Team 1 | Score | Team 2 |
|---|---|---|
| Inter Milan (Italy) | 5–0 | (Ukraine) Shakhtar Donetsk |

=== UEFA Youth League ===
==== UEFA Champions League Path ====
===== Group C =====
| Pos | Team | Pld | W | D | L | GF | GA | GD | Pts | Qualification | ATA | DZG | MCI | SHK |
|---|---|---|---|---|---|---|---|---|---|---|---|---|---|---|
| 1 | (Italy) Atalanta | 6 | 4 | 1 | 1 | 10 | 5 | +5 | 13 | Round of 16 | — | 2–0 | 1–0 | 2–2 |
| 2 | (Croatia) Dinamo Zagreb | 6 | 3 | 2 | 1 | 6 | 5 | +1 | 11 | Play-offs | 1–0 | — | 1–0 | 1–0 |
| 3 | (England) Manchester City | 6 | 2 | 1 | 3 | 11 | 8 | +3 | 7 | | 1–3 | 2–2 | — | 5–0 |
| 4 | (Ukraine) Shakhtar Donetsk | 6 | 0 | 2 | 4 | 5 | 14 | −9 | 2 | | 1–2 | 1–1 | 1–3 | — |

Source: UEFA

==== Domestic Champions Path ====
===== First round =====
| Team 1 | Agg. | Team 2 | 1st leg | 2nd leg |
|---|---|---|---|---|
| Dynamo Kyiv (Ukraine) | 10–2 | (North Macedonia) Shkëndija | 8–0 | 2–2 |

===== Second round =====
| Team 1 | Agg. | Team 2 | 1st leg | 2nd leg |
|---|---|---|---|---|
| Dynamo Kyiv (Ukraine) | 5–2 | (Greece) PAOK | 3–0 | 2–2 |

==== Play-offs ====
| Team 1 | Score | Team 2 |
|---|---|---|
| Dynamo Kyiv (Ukraine) | 0–0 (3–4 p) | (Croatia) Dinamo Zagreb |

=== UEFA Women's Champions League ===
==== Qualifying round ====
===== Group 4 =====
| Pos | Team | Pld | W | D | L | GF | GA | GD | Pts | Qualification | MIN | KHA | SPL | BET |
|---|---|---|---|---|---|---|---|---|---|---|---|---|---|---|
| 1 | (Belarus) FC Minsk | 3 | 3 | 0 | 0 | 16 | 1 | +15 | 9 | Knockout phase | — | — | 2–1 | 12–0 |
| 2 | (Ukraine) Zhytlobud-1 Kharkiv (H) | 3 | 2 | 0 | 1 | 9 | 4 | +5 | 6 | | 0–2 | — | — | 6–0 |
| 3 | (Croatia) Split | 3 | 1 | 0 | 2 | 10 | 7 | +3 | 3 | | — | 2–3 | — | — |
| 4 | (Luxembourg) Bettembourg | 3 | 0 | 0 | 3 | 2 | 25 | −23 | 0 | | — | — | 2–7 | — |

Source: UEFA
(H) Hosts

== Men's club football ==
| League | | Promoted to league | Relegated from league |
|---|---|---|---|
| Premier League | | Dnipro-1; Kolos Kovalivka | Chornomorets Odesa; ~~Arsenal–Kyiv~~ |
| PFL League One | | Mynai; Kremin Kremenchuk; Cherkashchyna; Metalurh Zaporizhzhia | ~~Sumy~~; ~~Zirka Kropyvnytskyi~~; ~~Kobra Kharkiv~~ |
| PFL League Two | Groups | | |
| PFL League Two | A | Uzhhorod; Dinaz Vyshhorod; Obolon-Brovar-2 | none |
| PFL League Two | B | Alians LD; VPK-Ahro; Avanhard-2; Chornomorets-2 | ~~Myr Hornostayivka~~ |

Note: For all scratched clubs, see section Clubs removed for more details

=== Premier League ===
==== First stage table ====
| Pos | Team | Pld | W | D | L | GF | GA | GD | Pts | Qualification or relegation (Note: Teams play each other twice (22 matches), before the league split into two groups (the top six and the bottom six) for the last 10 matches.) |
|---|---|---|---|---|---|---|---|---|---|---|
| 1 | Shakhtar Donetsk | 22 | 19 | 2 | 1 | 59 | 14 | +45 | 59 | Qualification for the Championship round |
| 2 | Dynamo Kyiv | 22 | 14 | 3 | 5 | 44 | 17 | +27 | 45 | Qualification for the Championship round |
| 3 | Zorya Luhansk | 22 | 13 | 4 | 5 | 39 | 18 | +21 | 43 | Qualification for the Championship round |
| 4 | Desna Chernihiv | 22 | 13 | 3 | 6 | 36 | 15 | +21 | 42 | Qualification for the Championship round |
| 5 | FC Oleksandriya | 22 | 11 | 4 | 7 | 30 | 23 | +7 | 37 | Qualification for the Championship round |
| 6 | Kolos Kovalivka | 22 | 8 | 2 | 12 | 25 | 39 | −14 | 26 | Qualification for the Championship round |
| 7 | SC Dnipro-1 | 22 | 7 | 4 | 11 | 26 | 34 | −8 | 25 (Note: Dnipro-1 is ahead of Mariupol on head-to-head goal difference: Dnipro-1 3, Mariupol 1) | Qualification for the Relegation round |
| 8 | FC Mariupol | 22 | 6 | 7 | 9 | 21 | 35 | −14 | 25 | Qualification for the Relegation round |
| 9 | FC Lviv | 22 | 5 | 5 | 12 | 16 | 35 | −19 | 20 (Note: Lviv is ahead of Vorskla on head-to-head goal difference: Lviv 4, Vorskla 3) | Qualification for the Relegation round |
| 10 | Vorskla Poltava | 22 | 6 | 2 | 14 | 15 | 38 | −23 | 20 | Qualification for the Relegation round |
| 11 | Olimpik Donetsk | 22 | 5 | 3 | 14 | 17 | 37 | −20 | 18 | Qualification for the Relegation round |
| 12 | Karpaty Lviv | 22 | 2 | 7 | 13 | 17 | 40 | −23 | 13 | Qualification for the Relegation round |

Source: Ukrainian Premier League, Soccerway
Rules for classification: 1) Points; 2) Head-to-head points; 3) Head-to-head goal difference; 4) Head-to-head higher number of goals scored; 5) Goal difference; 6) Higher number of goals scored; 7) Draw or "golden match" if tied for title (Article 22, paragraph 3).

==== Championship round table ====
| Pos | Team | Pld | W | D | L | GF | GA | GD | Pts | Qualification or relegation |
|---|---|---|---|---|---|---|---|---|---|---|
| 1 | Shakhtar Donetsk (C) | 32 | 26 | 4 | 2 | 80 | 26 | +54 | 82 | Qualification for the Champions League group stage |
| 2 | Dynamo Kyiv | 32 | 18 | 5 | 9 | 65 | 35 | +30 | 59 | Qualification for the Champions League third qualifying round |
| 3 | Zorya Luhansk | 32 | 17 | 7 | 8 | 50 | 29 | +21 | 58 | Qualification for the Europa League group stage |
| 4 | Desna Chernihiv | 32 | 17 | 5 | 10 | 59 | 33 | +26 | 56 | Qualification for the Europa League third qualifying round |
| 5 | FC Oleksandriya | 32 | 14 | 7 | 11 | 49 | 47 | +2 | 49 | Qualification for the playoff for Europa League second qualifying round |
| 6 | Kolos Kovalivka (O) | 32 | 10 | 2 | 20 | 33 | 59 | −26 | 32 | Qualification for the playoff for Europa League second qualifying round |

Source: Ukrainian Premier League, UEFA, Soccerway
Rules for classification: 1) Points; 2) Head-to-head points; 3) Head-to-head goal difference; 4) Head-to-head higher number of goals scored; 5) Goal difference; 6) Higher number of goals scored; 7) Draw or "golden match" if tied for title (Article 22, paragraph 3).
(C) Champions; (O) Play-off winners

==== Relegation round table ====
| Pos | Team | Pld | W | D | L | GF | GA | GD | Pts | Qualification or relegation |
|---|---|---|---|---|---|---|---|---|---|---|
| 7 | SC Dnipro-1 | 32 | 15 | 4 | 13 | 42 | 42 | 0 | 49 | Qualification for the playoff for Europa League second qualifying round |
| 8 | FC Mariupol | 32 | 12 | 9 | 11 | 40 | 46 | −6 | 45 | Qualification for the playoff for Europa League second qualifying round |
| 9 | Olimpik Donetsk | 32 | 10 | 6 | 16 | 32 | 47 | −15 | 36 | |
| 10 | Vorskla Poltava | 32 | 9 | 7 | 16 | 23 | 48 | −25 | 34 | |
| 11 | FC Lviv | 32 | 5 | 9 | 18 | 25 | 57 | −32 | 24 | |
| 12 | Karpaty Lviv (Note: Karpaty Lviv was expelled from the league for failing to appear to two games.) | 32 | 2 | 9 | 21 | 19 | 48 | −29 | 15 | Expelled from the league |

Source: Ukrainian Premier League, UEFA, Soccerway
Rules for classification: 1) Points; 2) Head-to-head points; 3) Head-to-head goal difference; 4) Head-to-head higher number of goals scored; 5) Goal difference; 6) Higher number of goals scored; 7) Draw or "golden match" if tied for title (Article 22, paragraph 3).

==== Play-offs for qualification to the UEFA Europa League ====
Teams that placed 5th and 6th in the Championship group with the teams placed 7th and 8th in the Relegation group played the one-leg play-off for one more berth in the Europa League second qualifying round. Winners of the semi-final pairs contested in one-leg final game the last berth to the UEFA Europa League. If the winners of the 2019–20 Ukrainian Cup Dynamo Kyiv hadn't already clinched the berth to the European competitions by the league performance, the play-off would have been set among teams placed 4th, 5th and 6th in the Championship group and 7th in the Relegation group in the same way.

Kolos Kovalivka won the play-off on 29 July 2020 after defeating FC Mariupol 1–0 after the extra time in the final.

Semi-finals; 25 July 2020
6th | Kolos Kovalivka | 4
7th | SC Dnipro-1 | 1
5th | FC Oleksandriya | 1
8th | FC Mariupol | 2

Final; 29 July 2020
6th | Kolos Kovalivka (a.e.t.) | 1
8th | FC Mariupol | 0

=== Semi-finals ===
| Team 1 | Score | Team 2 |
|---|---|---|
| Kolos Kovalivka | 4–1 | SC Dnipro-1 |
| FC Oleksandriya | 1–2 | FC Mariupol |

25 July 2020
17:00 UTC+3

| Kolos Kovalivka | 4–1 | SC Dnipro-1 |
|---|---|---|
| Orikhovskyi 22'; Antyukh 24', 50'; Morozko 87' | Report | Supriaha 48' |

Olimpiyskiy NSC, Kyiv
Attendance: 2,915 (Note: Played with attendance restrictions due to the COVID-19 pandemic in Ukraine.)
Referee: Kateryna Monzul, Kharkiv

25 July 2020
19:30 UTC+3

| FC Oleksandriya | 1–2 | FC Mariupol |
|---|---|---|
| Bezborodko 35' | Report | Polehenko 28'; Kashchuk 83' |

CSC Nika, Oleksandriya
Attendance: 1,070
Referee: Anatoliy Abdula, Kharkiv

=== Final ===
| Team 1 | Score | Team 2 |
|---|---|---|
| Kolos Kovalivka | 1–0 (a.e.t.) | FC Mariupol |

29 July 2020
19:30 UTC+3

| Kolos Kovalivka | 1–0 (a.e.t.) | FC Mariupol |
|---|---|---|
| Antyukh 95' | Report |

Olimpiyskiy NSC, Kyiv
Attendance: 5,073
Referee: Yevhen Aranovskyi, Kyiv

=== PFL League 1 (First League) ===
| Pos | Team | Pld | W | D | L | GF | GA | GD | Pts | Promotion, qualification or relegation |
|---|---|---|---|---|---|---|---|---|---|---|
| 1 | Mynai (C, P) | 30 | 19 | 5 | 6 | 51 | 28 | +23 | 62 | Promotion to Ukrainian Premier League |
| 2 | Rukh Lviv (P) | 30 | 18 | 7 | 5 | 51 | 21 | +30 | 61 | Promotion to Ukrainian Premier League |
| 3 | Inhulets Petrove (P) | 30 | 17 | 9 | 4 | 47 | 22 | +25 | 60 (Note: Head-to-head goal difference: Inhulets +1, Ahrobiznes -1) | Promotion to Ukrainian Premier League |
| 4 | Ahrobiznes Volochysk | 30 | 19 | 3 | 8 | 52 | 30 | +22 | 60 | |
| 5 | Volyn Lutsk | 30 | 17 | 6 | 7 | 57 | 36 | +21 | 57 | |
| 6 | Obolon-Brovar Kyiv | 30 | 14 | 9 | 7 | 40 | 31 | +9 | 51 (Note: Head-to-head goal difference: Obolon-Brovar +2, Metalist 1925 -2) | |
| 7 | Metalist 1925 Kharkiv | 30 | 15 | 6 | 9 | 44 | 34 | +10 | 51 | |
| 8 | Avanhard Kramatorsk | 30 | 13 | 6 | 11 | 37 | 40 | −3 | 45 | |
| 9 | Hirnyk-Sport Horishni Plavni | 30 | 12 | 3 | 15 | 42 | 48 | −6 | 39 (Note: Head-to-head goal difference: Hirnyk-Sport +1, Chornomorets -1) | |
| 10 | Chornomorets Odesa | 30 | 10 | 9 | 11 | 40 | 37 | +3 | 39 | |
| 11 | Mykolaiv | 30 | 8 | 10 | 12 | 45 | 45 | 0 | 34 | |
| 12 | Prykarpattia Ivano-Frankivsk | 30 | 9 | 3 | 18 | 44 | 51 | −7 | 30 | |
| 13 | Kremin Kremenchuk | 30 | 7 | 6 | 17 | 35 | 57 | −22 | 27 | |
| 14 | Balkany Zorya (Note: FC Balkany were relegated on own initiative.) (R) | 30 | 5 | 10 | 15 | 27 | 51 | −24 | 25 | Relegation to Ukrainian Second League |
| 15 | Metalurh Zaporizhya (Q, R) | 30 | 6 | 4 | 20 | 28 | 58 | −30 | 22 | Qualification to relegation play-offs |
| 16 | Cherkashchyna Cherkasy (Q, R) | 30 | 1 | 4 | 25 | 23 | 74 | −51 | 7 | Qualification to relegation play-offs |

Updated to match(es) played on 13 August 2020. Source: PFL Official Website
Rules for classification: 1) Points; 2) Head-to-head points; 3) Head-to-head goal difference; 4) Head-to-head goals scored; 5) Goal difference; 6) Goals scored.
(C) Champions; (P) Promoted; (Q) Qualified for the phase indicated; (R) Relegated
Notes:

| Team 1 | Agg. | Team 2 | 1st leg | 2nd leg |
|---|---|---|---|---|
| Veres Rivne | 3–1 | Cherkashchyna Cherkasy | 2–0 | 1–1 |
| Metalurh Zaporizhya | 0–3 | Alians Lypova Dolyna | 0–2 | 0–1 |

=== First match-up ===
16 August 2020
UTC+3

| Veres Rivne | 2–0 | Cherkashchyna Cherkasy |
|---|---|---|
| Petko 56'; Yaremenko 90+4' | Report |

Kolos Stadium, Mlyniv, Rivne Oblast
Referee: Dmytro Kutakov (Kyiv Oblast)

20 August 2020
UTC+3

| Cherkashchyna Cherkasy | 1–1 | Veres Rivne |
|---|---|---|
| Zakharevych 49' | Report | Makhnyev 18' (pen.) |

Arsenal Arena, Shchaslyve, Kyiv Oblast
Attendance: 0
Referee: Viktor Kopievskyi (Kropyvnytskyi)

Veres Rivne won 3–1 on aggregate and was promoted to the 2020–21 Ukrainian First League

=== Second match-up ===
16 August 2020
UTC+3

| Metalurh Zaporizhya | 0–2 | Alians Lypova Dolyna |
|---|---|---|
| | Report | Zahynaylov 14'; Sharai 60' |

Slavutych-Arena, Zaporizhya
Referee: Yevhen Aranovskyi (Kyiv)

20 August 2020
UTC+3

| Alians Lypova Dolyna | 1–0 | Metalurh Zaporizhya |
|---|---|---|
| Osadchyi 90+4' | Report |

Yuvileiny Stadium, Sumy
Attendance: 0
Referee: Mykola Balakin (Kyiv Oblast)

Alians Lypova Dolyna won 3–0 on aggregate and was promoted to the 2020–21 Ukrainian First League

=== PFL League 2 (Second League) ===
==== Group A ====
| Pos | Team | Pld | W | D | L | GF | GA | GD | Pts | Promotion, qualification or relegation |
|---|---|---|---|---|---|---|---|---|---|---|
| 1 | Nyva Ternopil (P) | 20 | 12 | 5 | 3 | 27 | 12 | +15 | 41 | Promotion to Ukrainian First League |
| 2 | Polissya Zhytomyr (P) | 20 | 11 | 6 | 3 | 28 | 11 | +17 | 39 | Promotion to Ukrainian First League |
| 3 | Veres Rivne (Q, P) | 20 | 11 | 3 | 6 | 34 | 23 | +11 | 36 | Qualification to promotion play-offs |
| 4 | Dinaz Vyshhorod | 20 | 9 | 4 | 7 | 27 | 24 | +3 | 31 | |
| 5 | FC Kalush | 20 | 8 | 5 | 7 | 26 | 20 | +6 | 29 (Note: Kalush: 3 pts, +2 gd; Podillia: 3 pts, -2 gd) | |
| 6 | Podillya Khmelnytskyi | 20 | 8 | 5 | 7 | 23 | 25 | −2 | 29 | |
| 7 | Chaika Petropavlivska Borshchahivka | 20 | 7 | 5 | 8 | 25 | 21 | +4 | 26 | |
| 8 | Bukovyna Chernivtsi | 20 | 6 | 2 | 12 | 25 | 36 | −11 | 20 (Note: Bukovyna: 4 pts; Nyva V.: 1 pts) | |
| 9 | Nyva Vinnytsia | 20 | 5 | 5 | 10 | 22 | 28 | −6 | 20 | |
| 10 | FC Uzhhorod | 20 | 5 | 4 | 11 | 19 | 36 | −17 | 19 | |
| 11 | Obolon-Brovar-2 Bucha | 20 | 4 | 4 | 12 | 18 | 38 | −20 | 16 | Relegation to Amateurs (canceled) |

Updated to match(es) played on 24 November 2019. Source: PFL Official Website
Rules for classification: 1) Points; 2) Head-to-head points; 3) Head-to-head goal difference; 4) Head-to-head goals scored; 5) Goal difference; 6) Goals scored.
(P) Promoted; (Q) Qualified for the phase indicated

==== Group B ====
| Pos | Team | Pld | W | D | L | GF | GA | GD | Pts | Promotion, qualification or relegation |
|---|---|---|---|---|---|---|---|---|---|---|
| 1 | VPK-Ahro Shevchenkivka (P) | 20 | 15 | 3 | 2 | 47 | 15 | +32 | 48 | Promotion to Ukrainian First League |
| 2 | Krystal Kherson (P) | 20 | 15 | 2 | 3 | 47 | 17 | +30 | 47 (Note: Krystal: 3 pts +1 gd; Alians: 3 pts, -1 gd) | Promotion to Ukrainian First League |
| 3 | Alians Lypova Dolyna (Q, P) | 20 | 15 | 2 | 3 | 51 | 12 | +39 | 47 | Qualification to promotion play-offs |
| 4 | Hirnyk Kryvyi Rih | 20 | 10 | 3 | 7 | 33 | 22 | +11 | 33 | |
| 5 | Enerhiya Nova Kakhovka | 20 | 6 | 7 | 7 | 25 | 26 | −1 | 25 | |
| 6 | FC Nikopol | 20 | 6 | 6 | 8 | 22 | 24 | −2 | 24 | |
| 7 | MFC Mykolaiv-2 | 20 | 5 | 8 | 7 | 18 | 32 | −14 | 23 | Promotion restrictions |
| 8 | Tavriya Simferopol | 20 | 5 | 2 | 13 | 12 | 32 | −20 | 17 | |
| 9 | Real Pharma Odesa | 20 | 4 | 4 | 12 | 10 | 38 | −28 | 16 | |
| 10 | Avanhard-2 Kramatorsk | 20 | 3 | 5 | 12 | 15 | 37 | −22 | 14 | Withdrawn after the season |
| 11 | Chornomorets-2 Odesa | 20 | 3 | 4 | 13 | 17 | 42 | −25 | 13 | Withdrawn after the season |

Updated to match(es) played on 24 November 2019. Source: PFL Official Website
Rules for classification: 1) Points; 2) Head-to-head points; 3) Head-to-head goal difference; 4) Head-to-head goals scored; 5) Goal difference; 6) Goals scored.
(P) Promoted; (Q) Qualified for the phase indicated

==== Championship game ====
| FC Nyva Ternopil | Cancelled | FC VPK-Ahro Shevchenkivka |

=== Cup competitions ===
==== Ukrainian Cup ====
===== Main bracket =====
Round of 32; 25 September - 2 October
25 September 2019
FC Mynai | 1
Volyn Lutsk | 0
25 September 2019
Bukovyna Chernivtsi | 0
FC Lviv | 2
25 September 2019
Ahrobiznes Volochysk | 1
SC Dnipro-1 | 3
25 September 2019
Inhulets Petrove (p) | 0 (7)
Karpaty Lviv | 0 (6)
25 September 2019
Dinaz Vyshhorod (a.e.t.) | 0
FC Oleksandriya | 1
25 September 2019
Alians Lypova Dolyna | 1
Balkany Zorya | 0
25 September 2019
Obolon-Brovar Kyiv (a.e.t.) | 0
Hirnyk-Sport Horishni Plavni | 2
25 September 2019
Kremin Kremenchuk | 2
Olimpik Donetsk | 3
2 October 2019
Rukh Lviv | 0
FC Mariupol | 1
25 September 2019
MFC Mykolaiv | 1
Chornomorets Odesa | 0

Round of 16; 30 October 2019
30 October 2019
FC Mynai | 2
FC Lviv | 0
30 October 2019
Inhulets Petrove | 2
SC Dnipro-1 | 1
30 October 2019
Dynamo Kyiv (a.e.t.) | 2
Shakhtar Donetsk | 1
30 October 2019
FC Oleksandriya (p) | 1 (5)
Zorya Luhansk | 1 (4)
30 October 2019
Alians Lypova Dolyna | 5
Hirnyk-Sport Horishni Plavni | 3
30 October 2019
FC Mariupol | 1
Olimpik Donetsk | 0
30 October 2019
MFC Mykolaiv | 2
Desna Chernihiv | 4
30 October 2019
Kolos Kovalivka | 0
Vorskla Poltava | 1

Quarter-finals; 11–12 March 2020
11 March
FC Mynai (p) | 1 (6)
Inhulets Petrove | 1 (5)
11 March
Dynamo Kyiv (a.e.t.) | 1
FC Oleksandriya | 0
11 March
Alians Lypova Dolyna | 2
FC Mariupol | 4
12 March
Desna Chernihiv | 0
Vorskla Poltava | 1

Semi-finals; 17–24 June 2020
17 June
FC Mynai | 0
Dynamo Kyiv | 2
24 June
FC Mariupol | 1 (2)
Vorskla Poltava | 1 (3)

Final; 8 July 2020
8 July
Dynamo Kyiv | 1 (8)
Vorskla Poltava | 1 (7)

===== Final =====
8 July 2020
21:30

| Dynamo Kyiv | 1–1 (a.e.t.) | Vorskla Poltava |
|---|---|---|
| Verbič 28' | Report | Stepanyuk 11' |
Penalties
| Verbič (penalty scored); Tsyhankov (penalty scored); Kędziora (penalty scored) de Pena (penalty scored); Andriyevskyi (penalty scored); Sydorchuk (penalty scored); Shaparenko (penalty scored); Mykolenko (penalty missed); Shabanov (penalty scored) | 8–7 | (penalty scored) Puclin; (penalty scored) Kane; (penalty scored) Luizão; (penalty scored) Opanasenko; (penalty scored) Ndiaye; (penalty scored) Chesnakov; (penalty scored) Perduta; (penalty missed) Sapay; (penalty missed) Bayenko |

OSC Metalist, Kharkiv
Attendance: 0 (Note: The final was played behind closed doors due to the COVID-19 pandemic in Ukraine.)
Referee: Kateryna Monzul (Kharkiv)

==== Super Cup ====
28 July 2019
21:00 EEST

| Dynamo Kyiv | 2–1 | Shakhtar Donetsk |
|---|---|---|
| Burda 80'; Harmash 83' | Report | Patrick 45+2' |

Chornomorets Stadium, Odesa
Attendance: 27,400
Referee: Vitaliy Romanov (Dnipro)

== Women's club football ==
| League | Promoted to league | Relegated from league |
|---|---|---|
| Higher League | Mariupilchanka Mariupol; EMS Podillia Vinnytsia | ~~Zlahoda-Dnipro-1~~; ~~WFC Lviv~~ |

Note: For all scratched clubs, see section Clubs removed for more details

=== Higher League ===
| Pos | Team | Pld | W | D | L | GF | GA | GD | Pts | Qualification or relegation |
|---|---|---|---|---|---|---|---|---|---|---|
| 1 | Zhytlobud-2 Kharkiv (Note: Participant of the 2019–20 Ukrainian Women's Cup final.) (C) | 18 | 17 | 0 | 1 | 100 | 5 | +95 | 51 | Qualification to Champions League |
| 2 | Zhytlobud-1 Kharkiv | 18 | 15 | 2 | 1 | 67 | 5 | +62 | 47 | |
| 3 | Voskhod Stara Maiachka | 18 | 11 | 2 | 5 | 44 | 28 | +16 | 35 | |
| 4 | Iatran Berestivets | 18 | 7 | 4 | 7 | 19 | 34 | −15 | 25 | Withdrew after the season |
| 5 | Iednist-ShVSM Plysky | 18 | 8 | 0 | 10 | 32 | 17 | +15 | 24 | Withdrew, later relegated |
| 6 | Pantery Uman | 18 | 6 | 3 | 9 | 21 | 57 | −36 | 21 | |
| 7 | Mariupilchanka | 18 | 5 | 1 | 12 | 15 | 82 | −67 | 16 | |
| 8 | Ladomyr Volodymyr-Volynskyi | 18 | 4 | 2 | 12 | 19 | 33 | −14 | 14 | Withdrew, later returned |
| 9 | EMS Podillia Vinnytsia | 18 | 2 | 4 | 12 | 15 | 30 | −15 | 10 | Withdrew, later returned |
| 10 | Rodyna Kostopil | 18 | 0 | 2 | 16 | 4 | 45 | −41 | 2 | Withdrew, later relegated |

Source: PFL.ua
Rules for classification: 1) Points; 2) Head-to-head points; 3) Head-to-head goal difference; 4) Head-to-head goals scored; 5) Goal difference; 6) Goals scored.
(C) Champions

== Managerial changes ==
This is a list of managerial changes among Ukrainian professional football clubs (top two leagues):

| Team | Outgoing manager | Manner of departure | Date of vacancy | Table | Incoming manager | Date of appointment | Table |
|---|---|---|---|---|---|---|---|
| Zorya Luhansk | (Ukraine) Yuriy Vernydub | Mutual consent | 31 May 2019 | Pre-season | (Ukraine) Viktor Skrypnyk | 3 June 2019 | Pre-season |
| Vorskla Poltava | (Ukraine) Vitaliy Kosovskyi (caretaker) | Change of contract | 4 June 2019 | Pre-season | (Ukraine) Vitaliy Kosovskyi | 4 June 2019 | Pre-season |
| Metalist 1925 Kharkiv | (Ukraine) Oleksandr Horyainov | Sacked | 4 June 2019 | Pre-season | (Ukraine) Andriy Demchenko | 19 June 2019 | Pre-season |
| Shakhtar Donetsk | (Portugal) Paulo Fonseca | Signed with A.S. Roma | 11 June 2019 | Pre-season | (Portugal) Luís Castro | 12 June 2019 | Pre-season |
| Metalurh Zaporizhya | (Ukraine) Oleh Taran | Resigned | 13 June 2019 | Pre-season | (Ukraine) Ivan Bohatyr | 25 June 2019 | Pre-season |
| Ahrobiznes Volochysk | (Ukraine) Andriy Donets' | End of interim Vice president | 15 June 2019 | Pre-season | (Ukraine) Ostap Markevych | 15 June 2019 | Pre-season |
| Karpaty Lviv | (Ukraine) Oleksandr Chyzhevskyi (caretaker) | Change of contract | 18 June 2019 | Pre-season | (Ukraine) Oleksandr Chyzhevskyi | 18 June 2019 | Pre-season |
| Mynai | (Estonia) Kirill Kurenko | Mutual consent | 18 June 2019 | Pre-season | (Ukraine) Vasyl Kobin | 19 June 2019 | Pre-season |
| Olimpik Donetsk | (Ukraine) Ihor Klymovskyi (interim) | End of interim term | 1 July 2019 | Pre-season | (Brazil) Júlio César Correia | 1 July 2019 | Pre-season |
| Dynamo Kyiv | (Belarus) Alyaksandr Khatskevich | Sacked | 14 August 2019 | 3rd | (Ukraine) Oleksiy Mykhaylychenko | 15 August 2019 | 3rd |
| Olimpik Donetsk | (Brazil) Júlio César Correia | Sacked | 19 August 2019 | 12th | (Ukraine) Ihor Klymovskyi (interim) | 19 August 2019 | 12th |
| Olimpik Donetsk | (Ukraine) Ihor Klymovskyi (interim) | End of interim | 2 September 2019 | 12th | (Spain) Vicente Gómez | 2 September 2019 | 12th |
| Karpaty Lviv | (Ukraine) Oleksandr Chyzhevskyi | Sacked | 3 September 2019 | 11th | (Ukraine) Roman Sanzhar | 3 September 2019 | 11th |
| Cherkashchyna | (Ukraine) Oleksandr Kyrylyuk | Resigned | 5 September 2019 | 13th | (Ukraine) Vitaliy Kobzar (interim) | 5 September 2019 | 13th |
| Hirnyk-Sport Horishni Plavni | (Ukraine) Volodymyr Mazyar | Mutual consent, health issues, signed with FC Lviv | 9 September 2019 | 14th | (Ukraine) Roman Pasichnychenko (interim) | 15 September 2019 | 14th |
| FC Lviv | (Ukraine) Bohdan Blavatskyi | Mutual consent | 10 September 2019 | 10th | (Ukraine) Volodymyr Mazyar | 10 September 2019 | 10th |
| Hirnyk-Sport Horishni Plavni | (Ukraine) Roman Pasichnychenko (interim) | End of interim | 16 September 2019 | 12th | (Ukraine) Ihor Zhabchenko | 16 September 2019 | 12th |
| Chornomorets Odesa | (Bulgaria) Angel Chervenkov | Resigned | 16 September 2019 | 10th | (Ukraine) Vitaliy Starovik (interim) | 16 September 2019 | 10th |
| Kremin Kremenchuk | (Ukraine) Ihor Stolovytskyi | Resigned | 17 September 2019 | 14th | (Ukraine) Volodymyr Prokopynenko (interim) | 17 September 2019 | 14th |
| Ahrobiznes Volochysk | (Ukraine) Ostap Markevych | Mutual Consent | 6 October 2019 | 7th | (Ukraine) Oleksandr Ivanov (interim) | 6 October 2019 | 7th |
| Metalurh Zaporizhya | (Ukraine) Ivan Bohatyr | Mutual Consent | 7 October 2019 | 16th | (Ukraine) Oleksiy Hodin (interim) | 7 October 2019 | 16th |
| MFC Mykolaiv | (Ukraine) Serhiy Shyshchenko | Sacked | 12 October 2019 | 12th | (Ukraine) Yuriy Chaus (interim) | 16 October 2019 | 12th |
| Chornomorets Odesa | (Ukraine) Vitaliy Starovik (interim) | End of interim | 14 October 2019 | 11th | (Ukraine) Ostap Markevych | 14 October 2019 | 11th |
| Cherkashchyna Cherkasy | (Kyrgyzstan) Vitaliy Kobzar (interim) | End of interim | 25 October 2019 | 15th | (Ukraine) Oleksandr Kyrylyuk | 25 October 2019 | 15th |
| FC Lviv | (Ukraine) Volodymyr Mazyar | Mutual consent | 31 October 2019 | 12th | (Armenia) Yegishe Melikyan | 31 October 2019 | 12th |
| Vorskla Poltava | (Ukraine) Vitaliy Kosovskyi | Change of contract | 14 November 2019 | 12th | (Ukraine) Yuriy Maksymov | 15 November 2019 | 12th |
| Ahrobiznes Volochysk | (Ukraine) Oleksandr Ivanov (interim) | End of interim | 6 December 2019 | 6th | (Ukraine) Oleksandr Chyzhevskyi | 10 December 2019 | 15th |
| MFC Mykolaiv | (Ukraine) Yuriy Chaus (interim) | End of interim spell | 9 December 2019 | 12th | (Ukraine) Illya Blyznyuk | 13 January 2020 | 12th |
| Rukh Lviv | (Belarus) Leonid Kuchuk | Mutual consent | 10 December 2019 | 1st | (Ukraine) Yuriy Bakalov | 14 December 2019 | 1st |
| Obolon-Brovar Kyiv | (Ukraine) Serhiy Kovalets | Mutual consent | 9 January 2020 | 5th | (Ukraine) Oleh Mazurenko | 13 January 2020 | 5th |
| Kremin Kremenchuk | (Ukraine) Volodymyr Prokopynenko (interim) | End of interim | 3 February 2020 | 13th | (Ukraine) Volodymyr Prokopynenko | 3 February 2020 | 13th |
| Kremin Kremenchuk | (Ukraine) Volodymyr Prokopynenko | Resigned | 10 February 2020 | 13th | (Ukraine) Serhiy Svystun | 10 February 2020 | 13th |
| Olimpik Donetsk | (Spain) Vicente Gómez | Mutual consent | 13 March 2020 | 11th | (Ukraine) Ihor Klymovskyi (interim) | 13 March 2020 | 11th |
| Chornomorets Odesa | (Ukraine) Ostap Markevych | Mutual Consent | April 2020 | 10th | (Ukraine) Serhiy Kovalets | 13 May 2020 | 10th |
| Rukh Lviv | (Ukraine) Yuriy Bakalov | Resigned (health concerns) | 15 June 2020 | 1st | (Ukraine) Ivan Fedyk | 16 June 2020 | 1st |
| FC Lviv | (Armenia) Yegishe Melikyan | End of contract | 21 June 2020 | 9th | (Georgia (country)) Giorgi Tsetsadze | 22 June 2020 | 9th |
| Obolon-Brovar Kyiv | (Ukraine) Oleh Mazurenko | Took time off | 8 July 2020 | 7th | (Ukraine) Valeriy Ivashchenko (interim) | 8 July 2020 | 7th |

== Clubs removed ==
- Arsenal–Kyiv withdrew from professional competitions after being relegated from the Premier League.
- PFC Sumy received new ownership during winter break in the face of Serhiy Vashchenko who earlier this season was supposed to become the owner of Kobra Kharkiv. The new head coach of the Sumy club who had been announced was also former head coach of Kobra, Oleksandr Oliynyk. At the same time according to the former club's director Anatoliy Boiko, on 1 December 2018 PFC Sumy did not have any players on contract. On 11 April 2019, the FFU Control and Disciplinary Committee adopted its decision to strip the club of professional status and exclude the club from any competitions that it is participating currently or in the future. However the club has a right to file an appeal. Additional separate sanctions were to be also applied against the club's playing and administrative personnel. On 14 April 2019, the chairman of the FFU committee of ethics and fair play Francesco Baranka noted in regards to additional sanctions that PFC Sumy has earned some €10 million in match fixing. More to it, Ukrainian coach Oleksandr Sevidov who held post of head coach consultant in PFC Sumy and previously managed FC Illichivets Mariupol received a lifetime disqualification.
- On 17 February 2019, president of FC Zirka Kropyvnytskyi commented on his club's withdrawal from further participation in competitions of the Ukrainian First League. The president accused the newly formed NABU and law enforcement authorities in pressure against him. The president of the league expressed his surprise claiming that there seemed no real reason why the club had to withdraw. On 5 April 2019, the PFL council of leagues adopted its decision to remove FC Zirka Kropyvnytskyi from the League as it officially withdrew on 14 March 2019. On 22 April 2019, the club's vice-president announced that the club will restart from regional competitions with intention to return the club's pro-status in the future.
- Helios Kharkiv, the club reorganized under new management under a new name as FC Kobra Kharkiv. The club merged with another amateur club called the Kobra Football Academy which was playing in the Kharkiv Oblast Football Championship. On 15 August 2018 the club informed the Professional Football League of Ukraine about withdrawal from professional competitions, and were later officially expelled from the league.
- FC Myr Hornostayivka withdrew from competitions in protest.
- Zlahoda-Dnipro-1 (dissolved)
- WFC Lviv (dissolved)
