= 2019–20 Ukrainian First League =

Ukrainian First League
- Season: 2019–20
- Dates: 27 July 2019 – 13 August 2020 (winter and emergency break 24 November 2019 – 24 June 2020)
- Champions: FC Mynai
- Promoted: FC Mynai, Inhulets Petrove, Rukh Lviv
- Relegated: Balkany Zoria, Metalurh Zaporizhia, Cherkashchyna Cherkasy
- Matches: 237
- Goals: 659 (2.78 per match)
- Top goalscorer: 18 – Denys Kozhanov (Volyn)
- Biggest home win: 5 – Ahrobiznes 5–0 Metalist 1925 (Round 19); Chornomorets 5–0 Kremin (Round 25); Volyn 5–0 Metalurh (Round 27)
- Biggest away win: 5 – Cherkashchyna 1–6 Rukh (Round 9)
- Highest scoring: 8 – Mykolaiv 6–2 Kremin (Round 9), Cherkashchyna 2–6 Mynai (Round 26)
- Longest winning run: 8 – Volyn (Round 11–18)
- Longest unbeaten run: 11 – Obolon-Brovar (Round 1–11)
- Longest winless run: 21 – Cherkashchyna (Round 6–26)
- Longest losing run: 11 – Cherkashchyna (Round 15–26)
- Highest attendance: 9,619 – Metalist 2–3 Mynai (Round 8)
- Lowest attendance: 0 – Volyn 3–2 Prykarpattia (Round 3)
- Total attendance: 269986
- Average attendance: 1776
- All statistics correct as of 13 August 2020.

The 2019–20 Ukrainian First League was the 29th since its establishment.

The competition began on 27 July 2019 with eight matches of Round 1, and went into recess for a winter break which started after the completion of Round 19 on 24 November 2019. The competition was to be resumed on 22 March 2020 and was expected to end 23 May 2020. However, on 17 March 2020 the Ukrainian Association of Football adopted the decision to pause all football competitions in the country since 18 March 2020 for unspecified period of time (until adoption of the next decision to resume all football events) due to the COVID-19 pandemic.

On 11 June 2020, the PFL Extraordinary Conference decided to resume the competition starting from 24 June with the conclusion on 11 August 2020. Additionally, the league will be expanded to 18 teams starting from the next season. Later the last day of competition was extended due to some unforeseen circumstances (see below for details).

The Video assistant referee (VAR) position was implemented in the league starting from the round 25, with the game between Obolon-Brovar Kyiv and Rukh Lviv the first to use it on 20 July 2020.

== Summary ==
On 6 June 2019 the PFL Council of leagues presented its plan draft ("contours") for the next season for both its First and its Second leagues. The final decision for the season was to be adopted at the next 27th PFL Conference which was scheduled for 27 June 2019.

For the next from 2020 to 2021 season, Ukrainian First League will expand to 18 teams. The bottom two team from Ukrainian First League will battle relegation play-off to Ukrainian Second League. The top two teams of each group from Ukrainian Second League will gain promotion to Ukrainian First League next season. However, the third place team from Ukrainian Second League of each group will battle promotion play-off to Ukrainian First League.

=== Revival of competitions and administrative crisis ===
On 21 May 2020, the PFL council of leagues at its open-air session at Obolon Arena adopted decision to end competitions in the Second League, while competitions in the First League were placed on hold as some clubs were against to renew the season and no consensus was reached. In addition to issues with restart of competitions in the First League, FC Inhulets Petrove accused the Professional Football League in wrong interpretation of the season's regulation in placement of teams with the same number of points ("head-to-head tiebreak"). Earlier the president of Inhulets expressed its thoughts that the Ukrainian PFL should be dissolved and both its First and Second leagues added to the Ukrainian Premier League. While some clubs insisted to continue the competitions from where they were left off, there were clubs that recommended to abandon the competitions and reset them by starting anew without rotation of teams between tiers. Among the latter clubs was MFC Mykolaiv.

On 29 May 2020, an information has leaked that competitions are expected to resume on 23 June 2020. On 5 June 2020 another meeting of the PFL council of leagues approved resuming competitions in the First League (Persha Liha) starting on 23 June 2020 and made some adjustments to its season regulations among which it was decided to expand the league for the next season to 18 teams (from 16 currently) and therefore the relegation zone was removed, but the last two teams are expected to play-off with the two third placed teams out of the Second League (Druha Liha). The final decision in that regard is expected to be adopted at the next UAF Executive Committee meeting on 7 June 2020. The UAF Executive Committee postponed with its decision and asked the PFL to call for its conference on 11 June where it is expected to confirm the PFL's decision about next season and check if it is possible to resume competitions in both its divisions. The UAF Executive Committee also confirmed that the First League junior tournament is discontinued. The UAF President Pavelko also urged referee to prepare for the current season.

On 27 July 2020 24 out of 34 PFL clubs expressed their vote of no confidence to the PFL president Serhiy Makarov. On 5 August 2020 took place another PFL Council of leagues which ended in scandal and resignation of the PFL president Makarov. In opinion of the PFL, the meeting's main task was a deliberate disruption of the First League (Persha Liha) competitions.

=== Situation with promotions ===
On 9 July 2020, the president of Ahrobiznes Oleh Sobutskyi announced that his club will not apply on certification for the Ukrainian Premier League due to inadequate conditions of the club's stadium. Similarly, back in the 2012–13 and 2013–14 FC Oleksandriya and FC Stal Alchevsk were also refusing to be promoted on various pretenses. Yet, back in the 2016–17 NK Veres Rivne was promoted ahead of FC Desna Chernihiv, because supposedly the Chernihiv club did not have adequate home stadium, yet Veres that is based in Rivne after promotion played in Lviv. On 9 July 2020 on the Sobutskyi's announcement, the Ukrainian PFL sports director Yevhen Moroz commented not to jump to conclusion considering that the UAF awards certifications depending on situation recalling couple of other examples. On 24 July 2020, the UAF Control and Disciplinary Committee (CDC) issued an official warning to the PFL sports director for his comment which "damages image of the Association and the Ukrainian football in general".

== Teams ==
=== Promoted teams ===
The following teams have been promoted from the 2018–19 Ukrainian Second League:

- FC Mynai – first place of the 2018–19 Ukrainian Second League Group A (debut)
- Cherkashchyna-Akademiya Biloziria – second place of the 2018–19 Ukrainian Second League Group A, play-off win (returning after a season, previously competed as Cherkaskyi Dnipro competed in the 2017–18 season)
- Kremin Kremenchuk – first place of the 2018–19 Ukrainian Second League Group B (returning after a season)
- Metalurh Zaporizhya – second place of the 2018–19 Ukrainian Second League Group B, play-off defeat, but later promoted (debut, however another club named as Metalurh Zaporizhya competed in the 2011–12 season)

=== Relegated teams ===
The following teams have been relegated from the 2018–19 Ukrainian Premier League:

- Chornomorets Odesa – 11th place of the 2018–19 Ukrainian Premier League, play-off defeat (returns after 8 seasons)

=== Reformed/reorganized teams ===
- FC Rukh Vynnyky has officially relocated to Lviv and reformed as FC Rukh Lviv. Those changes were approved by the 27th PFL Conference.
- FC Cherkashchyna-Akademiya Biloziria was reorganized again as FC Cherkashchyna and moved back to Cherkasy. During winter break the senior team was abandoned by its owners and taken over by Football Federation of Cherkasy Oblast to avoid withdrawal of the club mid season.

=== Withdrawn teams ===
- Arsenal Kyiv – 12th place of the 2018–19 Ukrainian Premier League, was originally relegated, but later withdraw from the First League. Arsenal Kyiv was replaced by Metalurh Zaporizhya that lost promotional play-offs to Ahrobiznes.

=== Location map ===
The following displays the location of teams.

Home venues of teams in the 2019–20 Ukrainian First League.

== Stadiums ==
The following stadiums are considered home grounds for the teams in the competition.

Rank	Stadium	Location	Capacity	Club	Notes
1	OSC Metalist	Kharkiv	40,003	Metalist 1925 Kharkiv	
2	Chornomorets Stadium	Odesa	34,164	Chornomorets Odesa	
3	Central City Stadium	Mykolaiv	15,600	MFC Mykolaiv	Since Round 20 field in reconstruction
4	Avanhard Stadium	Lutsk	12,080	Volyn Lutsk	
5	Slavutych-Arena	Zaporizhya	11,883	Metalurh Zaporizhya	
6	Tsentralnyi Stadion	Cherkasy	10,321	Cherkashchyna Cherkasy	
7	Sport Complex Podillya	Khmelnytskyi	6,800	Ahrobiznes Volochysk	Used in Round 28
8	MCS Rukh	Ivano-Frankivsk	6,500	Prykarpattia Ivano-Frankivsk	Under passive reconstruction since 1986, only one stand out of four is active
9	Prapor Stadium	Kramatorsk	6,000	Avanhard Kramatorsk	
10	Obolon Arena	Kyiv	5,100	Obolon Brovar Kyiv	
11	Skif Stadium	Lviv	3,742	Rukh Lviv	
12	Lokomotyv Stadium	Poltava	3,700	Kremin Kremenchuk	Rounds 4 thru 15
13	Yunist Stadium	Volochysk	2,700	Ahrobiznes Volochysk	
14	Yunist Stadium	Horishni Plavni	2,500	Hirnyk-Sport Horishni Plavni Kremin Kremenchuk	main Round 2
15	Inhulets Stadium	Petrove	1,869	Inhulets Petrove	
16	Borys Tropanets Stadium	Zorya, Sarata Raion	1,854	Balkany Zorya	
17	Kremin Stadium	Kremenchuk	1,500	Kremin Kremenchuk	since Round 16
18	Mynai Arena	Mynai	1,312	FC Mynai	
19	Arsenal Arena	Shchaslyve	1,000	Cherkashchyna Cherkasy	Used as home stadium since Round 17
20	Central City Stadium (upper field)	Mykolaiv	500	MFC Mykolaiv	Before Round 20

== Managers ==
Club	Head coach	Replaced coach
Ahrobiznes Volochysk	(Ukraine) Oleksandr Chyzhevskyi	(Ukraine) Ostap Markevych (Ukraine) Oleksandr Ivanov (interim)
Avanhard Kramatorsk	(Ukraine) Oleksiy Horodov (interim)	(Ukraine) Oleksandr Kosevych
Balkany Zorya	(Ukraine) Andriy Parkhomenko	
Cherkashchyna Cherkasy	(Ukraine) Oleksandr Kyrylyuk	(Ukraine) Oleksandr Kyrylyuk (Kyrgyzstan) Vitaliy Kobzar (interim)
Chornomorets Odesa	(Ukraine) Serhiy Kovalets	(Bulgaria) Angel Chervenkov (Ukraine) Vitaliy Starovik (interim) (Ukraine) Ostap Markevych
Hirnyk-Sport Horishni Plavni	(Ukraine) Ihor Zhabchenko	(Ukraine) Volodymyr Mazyar (Ukraine) Roman Pasichnychenko (interim)
Inhulets Petrove	(Ukraine) Serhiy Lavrynenko	
Kremin Kremenchuk	(Ukraine) Serhiy Svystun	(Ukraine) Ihor Stolovytskyi (Ukraine) Volodymyr Prokopynenko
Metalist 1925 Kharkiv	(Ukraine) Vyacheslav Khruslov (interim)	(Ukraine) Andriy Demchenko
Metalurh Zaporizhya	(Ukraine) Oleksiy Hodin (interim)	(Ukraine) Ivan Bohatyr
MFC Mykolaiv	(Ukraine) Illya Blyznyuk	(Ukraine) Serhiy Shyshchenko (Ukraine) Yuriy Chaus (interim)
FC Mynai	(Ukraine) Vasyl Kobin	
Obolon Brovar Kyiv	(Ukraine) Valeriy Ivashchenko (interim)	(Ukraine) Serhiy Kovalets (Ukraine) Oleh Mazurenko
Prykarpattia Ivano-Frankivsk	(Ukraine) Volodymyr Kovalyuk	
Rukh Lviv	(Ukraine) Ivan Fedyk	(Belarus) Leonid Kuchuk (Ukraine) Yuriy Bakalov
Volyn Lutsk	(Ukraine) Andriy Tlumak	

=== Managerial changes ===
Team	Outgoing head coach	Manner of departure	Date of vacancy	Table	Incoming head coach	Date of appointment
Metalist 1925 Kharkiv	(Ukraine) Oleksandr Horyainov	Sacked	4 June 2019	Pre-season	(Ukraine) Andriy Demchenko	19 June 2019
Metalurh Zaporizhya	(Ukraine) Oleh Taran	Resigned	13 June 2019	Pre-season	(Ukraine) Ivan Bohatyr	25 June 2019
Ahrobiznes Volochysk	(Ukraine) Andriy Donets	End of interim Vice president	15 June 2019	Pre-season	(Ukraine) Ostap Markevych	15 June 2019
FC Mynai	(Estonia) Kirill Kurenko	Mutual consent	18 June 2019	Pre-season	(Ukraine) Vasyl Kobin	19 June 2019
Cherkashchyna Cherkasy	(Ukraine) Oleksandr Kyrylyuk	Resigned	5 September 2019	13th	(Kyrgyzstan) Vitaliy Kobzar (interim)	5 September 2019
Hirnyk-Sport Horishni Plavni	(Ukraine) Volodymyr Mazyar	Mutual consent, health issues, signed with FC Lviv	9 September 2019	14th	(Ukraine) Roman Pasichnychenko (interim)	15 September 2019
Hirnyk-Sport Horishni Plavni	(Ukraine) Roman Pasichnychenko (interim)	End of interim	16 September 2019	12th	(Ukraine) Ihor Zhabchenko	16 September 2019
Chornomorets Odesa	(Bulgaria) Angel Chervenkov	Resigned	16 September 2019	10th	(Ukraine) Vitaliy Starovik (interim)	16 September 2019
Kremin Kremenchuk	(Ukraine) Ihor Stolovytskyi	Resigned	17 September 2019	14th	(Ukraine) Volodymyr Prokopynenko (interim)	17 September 2019
Ahrobiznes Volochysk	(Ukraine) Ostap Markevych	Mutual Consent	6 October 2019	7th	(Ukraine) Oleksandr Ivanov (interim)	6 October 2019
Metalurh Zaporizhya	(Ukraine) Ivan Bohatyr	Mutual Consent	7 October 2019	16th	(Ukraine) Oleksiy Hodin (interim)	7 October 2019
MFC Mykolaiv	(Ukraine) Serhiy Shyshchenko	Sacked	12 October 2019	12th	(Ukraine) Yuriy Chaus (interim)	16 October 2019
Chornomorets Odesa	(Ukraine) Vitaliy Starovik (interim)	End of interim	14 October 2019	11th	(Ukraine) Ostap Markevych	14 October 2019
Cherkashchyna Cherkasy	(Kyrgyzstan) Vitaliy Kobzar (interim)	End of interim	25 October 2019	15th	(Ukraine) Oleksandr Kyrylyuk	25 October 2019
Ahrobiznes Volochysk	(Ukraine) Oleksandr Ivanov (interim)	End of interim	6 December 2019	6th	(Ukraine) Oleksandr Chyzhevskyi	10 December 2019
MFC Mykolaiv	(Ukraine) Yuriy Chaus (interim)	End of interim spell	9 December 2019	12th	(Ukraine) Illya Blyznyuk	13 January 2020
Rukh Lviv	(Belarus) Leonid Kuchuk	Mutual consent	10 December 2019	1st	(Ukraine) Yuriy Bakalov	14 December 2019
Obolon-Brovar Kyiv	(Ukraine) Serhiy Kovalets	Mutual consent	9 January 2020	5th	(Ukraine) Oleh Mazurenko	13 January 2020
Kremin Kremenchuk	(Ukraine) Volodymyr Prokopynenko (interim)	End of interim	3 February 2020	13th	(Ukraine) Volodymyr Prokopynenko	3 February 2020
Kremin Kremenchuk	(Ukraine) Volodymyr Prokopynenko	Resigned	10 February 2020	13th	(Ukraine) Serhiy Svystun	10 February 2020
Chornomorets Odesa	(Ukraine) Ostap Markevych	Mutual Consent	April 2020	10th	(Ukraine) Serhiy Kovalets	13 May 2020
Rukh Lviv	(Ukraine) Yuriy Bakalov	Resigned (health concerns)	15 June 2020	1st	(Ukraine) Ivan Fedyk	16 June 2020
Obolon-Brovar Kyiv	(Ukraine) Oleh Mazurenko	Took time off	8 July 2020	7th	(Ukraine) Valeriy Ivashchenko (interim)	8 July 2020
Metalist 1925 Kharkiv	(Ukraine) Andriy Demchenko	Mutual consent	21 July 2020	7th	(Ukraine) Vyacheslav Khruslov (interim)	21 July 2020
Avanhard Kramatorsk	(Ukraine) Oleksandr Kosevych	Undisclosed	10 August 2020	8th	(Ukraine) Oleksiy Horodov (interim)	11 August 2020

== League table ==
Pos	Team	Pld	W	D	L	GF	GA	GD	Pts	Promotion, qualification or relegation
1	Mynai (C, P)	30	19	5	6	51	28	+23	62	Promotion to Ukrainian Premier League
2	Rukh Lviv (P)	30	18	7	5	51	21	+30	61	Promotion to Ukrainian Premier League
3	Inhulets Petrove (P)	30	17	9	4	47	22	+25	60 (Note: Head-to-head goal difference: Inhulets +1, Ahrobiznes -1)	Promotion to Ukrainian Premier League
4	Ahrobiznes Volochysk	30	19	3	8	52	30	+22	60	
5	Volyn Lutsk	30	17	6	7	57	36	+21	57	
6	Obolon-Brovar Kyiv	30	14	9	7	40	31	+9	51 (Note: Head-to-head goal difference: Obolon-Brovar +2, Metalist 1925 -2)	
7	Metalist 1925 Kharkiv	30	15	6	9	44	34	+10	51	
8	Avanhard Kramatorsk	30	13	6	11	37	40	−3	45	
9	Hirnyk-Sport Horishni Plavni	30	12	3	15	42	48	−6	39 (Note: Head-to-head goal difference: Hirnyk-Sport +1, Chornomorets -1)	
10	Chornomorets Odesa	30	10	9	11	40	37	+3	39	
11	Mykolaiv	30	8	10	12	45	45	0	34	
12	Prykarpattia Ivano-Frankivsk	30	9	3	18	44	51	−7	30	
13	Kremin Kremenchuk	30	7	6	17	35	57	−22	27	
14	Balkany Zorya (Note: FC Balkany were relegated on own initiative.) (R)	30	5	10	15	27	51	−24	25	Relegation to Ukrainian Second League
15	Metalurh Zaporizhya (Q, R)	30	6	4	20	28	58	−30	22	Qualification to relegation play-offs
16	Cherkashchyna Cherkasy (Q, R)	30	1	4	25	23	74	−51	7	Qualification to relegation play-offs

Updated to match(es) played on 13 August 2020. Source: PFL Official Website
Rules for classification: 1) Points; 2) Head-to-head points; 3) Head-to-head goal difference; 4) Head-to-head goals scored; 5) Goal difference; 6) Goals scored.
(C) Champions; (P) Promoted; (Q) Qualified for the phase indicated; (R) Relegated

=== Position by round ===
Team ╲ Round	1	2	3	4	5	6	7	8	9	10	11	12	13	14	15	16	17	18	19	20	21	22	23	24	25	26	27	28	29	30
FC Mynai	16	15	12	13	10	9	7	5	4	3	2	5	6	5	7	6	5	6	3	6	6	5	3	2	2	2	1	2	2	1
Rukh Lviv	5	5	7	4	6	3	3	2	1	4	6	4	5	4	3	2	4	3	1	2	5	6	7	6	6	5	5	5	5	2
Inhulets Petrove	12	7	3	1	1	5	6	8	7	6	5	3	2	6	4	4	6	5	4	1	2	3	1	1	1	1	2	1	1	3
Ahrobiznes Volochysk	10	14	9	5	2	1	1	1	2	1	4	7	3	1	6	7	7	7	6	7	4	1	2	3	4	3	3	3	3	4
Volyn Lutsk	11	10	10	12	9	10	8	7	8	8	8	8	8	7	5	5	3	1	2	5	3	4	5	4	3	4	4	4	4	5
Obolon-Brovar Kyiv	7	9	5	3	4	6	5	4	3	2	1	1	1	3	2	1	1	2	5	4	7	7	6	5	5	7	7	7	6	6
Metalist 1925 Kharkiv	6	6	8	10	5	2	2	6	5	5	3	2	4	2	1	3	2	4	7	3	1	2	4	7	7	6	6	6	7	7
Avanhard Kramatorsk	4	8	4	2	3	4	4	3	6	7	7	6	7	8	8	8	8	8	8	8	8	8	8	8	8	8	8	8	8	8
Hirnyk-Sport Horishni Plavni	14	16	16	14	15	14	14	14	12	11	12	9	10	10	12	11	9	9	9	9	9	9	9	9	9	9	9	9	9	9
Chornomorets Odesa	2	2	2	8	11	7	9	9	10	9	9	10	11	12	10	9	10	10	10	10	10	10	10	10	10	10	10	10	10	10
MFC Mykolaiv	3	3	11	6	7	8	10	11	9	10	10	11	12	11	11	12	12	12	12	11	11	11	12	12	12	11	11	11	11	11
Prykarpattia Ivano-Frankivsk	1	1	1	7	8	11	11	10	11	12	13	12	9	9	9	10	11	11	11	12	12	12	11	11	11	13	13	13	12	12
Kremin Kremenchuk	9	4	6	9	13	12	12	12	14	14	14	14	14	14	14	14	14	14	13	13	13	13	13	13	13	12	12	12	13	13
Balkany Zorya	13	12	15	11	14	15	15	15	13	13	11	13	13	13	13	13	13	13	14	14	14	14	14	14	14	14	14	14	14	14
Metalurh Zaporizhya	8	11	14	16	16	16	16	16	16	16	16	16	16	16	16	16	15	15	15	15	15	15	15	15	15	15	15	15	15	15
Cherkashchyna Cherkasy	15	13	13	15	12	13	13	13	15	15	15	15	15	15	15	15	16	16	16	16	16	16	16	16	16	16	16	16	16	16

Updated to match(es) played on 13 August 2020. Source: PFL Official Website

== Results ==
Home \ Away	AHR	AVK	BAZ	CHE	CHO	HIS	INH	KRE	M25	MZA	MYK	MYN	OBL	PIF	RUX	VOL
Ahrobiznes Volochysk		2–1	3–0	1–0	2–0	4–0	2–1	2–2	5–0	2–0	2–2	0–2	2–0	1–2	1–0	3–0 (Note: The game was played in Vynnyky at Markevych Stadium as part of punishment against Ahrobiznes for recent (Round 24) violence against a referee.)
Avanhard Kramatorsk	1–1		2–2	2–1	3–1	1–1	2–1	1–0	0–1	1–0	3–1	0–2	1–1	2–0	0–1	3–2
Balkany Zorya	0–1	0–2		1–0	1–1 (Note: On 5 October 2019 the Round 12 game stopped on 68th minute at 1–1 score, due to the visiting team fans violence. On 18 October 2019 it was announced that the game will be completed from the moment the game was stopped. The date of the game would be announced later. On 21 October 2019 it was announced that the game will be completed on 30 October 2019 from the 71st minute. The game was completed without spectators on 30 October 2019 without a score change.)	0–0	1–1	1–1	0–0	4–0	1–3	0–2	1–1	2–0	0–1	1–4
Cherkashchyna Cherkasy	1–2	1–2	3–0		1–3	1–2	1–2	2–2	1–4	0–3	0–4	2–6	1–2 (Note: The game Cherkashchyna – Obolon-Brovar was played in Shchaslyve.)	0–0	1–6	0–2
Chornomorets Odesa	0–1	0–1	2–2	2–1		3–1	0–3	5–0	0–0	1–0	0–0	1–1	0–1	3–2	2–2	5–2
Hirnyk-Sport Horishni Plavni	3–2	2–0	4–0	2–1	3–0		1–1	0–2	1–2	1–0	1–3	1–0	0–1	2–4	2–1 (Note: The game originally scheduled for Saturday 28 September 2019 was postponed for another date due to games schedule issue and will be announced later. The game played on 20 November 2019.)	2–4
Inhulets Petrove	2–0	3–2	4–0	1–0	0–0	2–1		3–0	1–1	3–2	3–2	1–1	2–0	1–0	1–1	0–0
Kremin Kremenchuk	4–0	1–1	0–0	2–0	2–4	1–2	0–3		2–4	1–0	2–1	1–0	1–0	3–4	0–1	1–1
Metalist 1925 Kharkiv	0–1	0–1	1–0	2–0	0–0	2–1	1–0	4–2		2–0	0–0	2–3	2–1	3–1	1–1	2–0
Metalurh Zaporizhya	1–3	3–1	2–1	1–1 (Note: see the note for Rukh–Metalurh game)	1–4	3–2 (Note: see the note for Rukh–Metalurh game)	0–2	2–1	1–4		1–1	0–2	0–1	1–0	0–1	1–3
MFC Mykolaiv	0–2	0–1	1–2	3–0	0–0	0–3	1–2	6–2	3–2	1–1		1–1	0–2	5–1	1–1	3–2
FC Mynai	2–1	2–0	2–1	3–1	1–0	1–0	1–1	3–1	1–0	2–1	2–0		4–1	0–3	1–1	1–0
Obolon-Brovar Kyiv	2–1	1–1	3–0	2–2	1–0	0–2	1–1	1–0	3–0	3–3	2–0	4–3		3–3	0–0	0–0
Prykarpattia Ivano-Frankivsk	0–1	3–0 (Note: Originally ended in a 2–2 tie, on 8 August 2019 the FFU CDC has awarded technical win to Prykarpattia (3:0) and technical loss to Avanhard (0:3) due to ineligible player issue.)	1–2	4–1	0–1	4–1	0–1	2–1	2–3	2–1	1–1	1–2	0–2		0–1	1–2
Rukh Lviv	2–3 (Note: On 23 June 2020 it was announced that several games were postponed as several players in various clubs were tested positive for COVID-19. Two games were postponed for a day, Rukh–Ahrobiznes was moved to 7 July 2020.)	4–0 (Note: On 9 August 2020 it became known that the game Rukh–Avanhard scheduled to take place on 13 August, might not happen as several players and the club's head coach left the club due to end of their contract. On 11 August 2020 it was confirmed that the club departed for the game with its junior squad coached by Oleksiy Horodov who was appointed as an interim manager.)	3–0	4–0	2–0	2–1	1–0	1–0	1–0	3–0 (Note: Several games of Metalurh with Rukh, Cherkashchyna, and Hirnyk were suspended as number of Metalurh players were tested positive for COVID-19. Scheduled to be played on 10 August 2020, the game Rukh – Metalurh failed to take place as Metalurh refused to travel to Lviv due to hardship with organization of travel, lodging reservation as well as tight game scheduling by playing three games a week. On 14 August 2020 the UAF CDC has awarded technical win to Rukh (3:0) and technical loss to Metalurh (0:3) for non-attendance at the match without good reason.)	4–1	1–0 (Note: The game Rukh–Mynai that was played on 3 August 2020 at Skif Stadium in Lviv attended 100 spectators.)	0–1	2–1		1–1
Volyn Lutsk	2–1	2–1	2–2	3–0	3–2	3–0	0–1	3–0	2–0	5–0	1–1	1–0	1–0	3–2	3–2	

Updated to match(es) played on 13 August 2020. Source: Calendar (in Ukrainian)
Legend: Blue = home team win; Yellow = draw; Red = away team win.

== Relegation play-offs ==
The relegation play-off games were scheduled to take place between the last two places (15th and 16th) of the First League with the 3rd places from both groups of the Second League. On 28 July 2020, the PFL play-offs draw took place. The play-offs were arranged as a two-leg format (each team plays at home and away), with games scheduled to take place on August 15 and 19. On 7 August 2020, the PFL administration announced that dates for promotion/relegation playoffs were shifted by one day. The First League clubs Metalurh Zaporizhia and FC Cherkashchyna qualified for the play-offs.

Team 1	Agg.	Team 2	1st leg	2nd leg
Veres Rivne	3–1	Cherkashchyna Cherkasy	2–0	1–1
Metalurh Zaporizhya	0–3	Alians Lypova Dolyna	0–2	0–1

=== First match-up ===
16 August 2020
UTC+3

Veres Rivne	2–0	Cherkashchyna Cherkasy
Petko 56'; Yaremenko 90+4'	Report

Kolos Stadium, Mlyniv, Rivne Oblast
Referee: Dmytro Kutakov (Kyiv Oblast)

20 August 2020
UTC+3

Cherkashchyna Cherkasy	1–1	Veres Rivne
Zakharevych 49'	Report	Makhnyev 18' (pen.)

Arsenal Arena, Shchaslyve, Kyiv Oblast
Attendance: 0
Referee: Viktor Kopievskyi (Kropyvnytskyi)

Veres Rivne won 3–1 on aggregate and was promoted to the 2020–21 Ukrainian First League

=== Second match-up ===
16 August 2020
UTC+3

Metalurh Zaporizhya	0–2	Alians Lypova Dolyna
	Report	Zahynaylov 14'; Sharai 60'

Slavutych-Arena, Zaporizhya
Referee: Yevhen Aranovskyi (Kyiv)

20 August 2020
UTC+3

Alians Lypova Dolyna	1–0	Metalurh Zaporizhya
Osadchyi 90+4'	Report

Yuvileiny Stadium, Sumy
Attendance: 0
Referee: Mykola Balakin (Kyiv Oblast)

Alians Lypova Dolyna won 3–0 on aggregate and was promoted to the 2020–21 Ukrainian First League

Following the play-offs, the fate of both Cherkashchyna and Metalurh was postponed to be determined at the PFL Conference the next day due to elimination of Karpaty Lviv and expression of interest by Balkany to be demoted.

== Top goalscorers ==
As of 13 August 2020

Rank	Scorer	Team	Goals (Pen.)
1	(Ukraine) Denys Kozhanov	Volyn Lutsk	18 (6)
2	(Georgia (country)) Nika Sichinava	Inhulets Petrove	17 (2)
2	(Ukraine) Anatoliy Nuriyev	FC Mynai	17 (9)
4	(Ukraine) Vadym Yavorskyi	Avanhard / Mykolaiv	15 (1)
5	(Ukraine) Danylo Kondrakov	Rukh Lviv	11 (2)
5	(Ukraine) Ihor Sikorskyi	Ahrobiznes / Chornomorets	11 (2)
5	(Ukraine) Yuriy Klymchuk	Rukh Lviv	11 (5)
8	(Ukraine) Oleksandr Batalskyi	Obolon-Brovar Kyiv	10 (1)
8	(Ukraine) Roman Barchuk	Prykarpattia Ivano-Frankivsk	10 (2)
8	(Ukraine) Yaroslav Yampol	Metalist 1925 Kharkiv	10 (3)

Notes:

- Players who scored for two teams from the same league have both teams mentioned.

== Awards ==
=== Monthly awards ===
Month	Player of the Month		
Month	Player	Club	Reference
August 2019	(Ukraine) Yaroslav Yampol	Metalist 1925 Kharkiv	
September 2019	(Ukraine) Nazar Fedorivskyi	Obolon-Brovar Kyiv	
October 2019	(Ukraine) Denys Kozhanov	Volyn Lutsk	
November 2019	(Ukraine) Dmytro Kozban	Kremin Kremenchuk	
June 2020	(Ukraine) Oleksandr Mishurenko	Inhulets Petrove	
July 2020	(Ukraine) Petro Stasiuk	FC Mynai	

=== Round awards ===
Round	Player			Coach		
Round	Player	Club	Reference	Coach	Club	Reference
Round 1	(Ukraine) Vladyslav Buhay	MFC Mykolaiv		(Ukraine) Andriy Demchenko	Metalist 1925 Kharkiv	
Round 2	(Ukraine) Vitaliy Boiko	Cherkashchyna Cherkasy		(Ukraine) Serhiy Lavrynenko	Inhulets Petrove	
Round 3	(Slovenia) Miha Goropevšek	Volyn Lutsk		(Ukraine) Ostap Markevych	Ahrobiznes Volochysk	
Round 4	(Ukraine) Ihor Medynskyi	Obolon-Brovar Kyiv		(Ukraine) Oleksandr Kosevych	Avanhard Kramatorsk	
Round 5	(Ukraine) Yaroslav Yampol	Metalist 1925 Kharkiv		(Ukraine) Vasyl Kobin	FC Mynai	
Round 6	(Ukraine) Volodymyr Tanchyk	Chornomorets Odesa		(Belarus) Leonid Kuchuk	Rukh Lviv	
Round 7	(Ukraine) Vadym Yavorskyi	Avanhard Kramatorsk		(Ukraine) Oleksandr Kosevych (2)	Avanhard Kramatorsk	
Round 8	(Ukraine) Ruslan Chernenko	Ahrobiznes Volochysk		(Ukraine) Ivan Bohatyr	Metalurh Zaporizhya	
Round 9	(Ukraine) Robert Hehedosh	FC Mynai		(Ukraine) Vasyl Kobin (2)	FC Mynai	
Round 10	(Ukraine) Ihor Sikorskyi	Ahrobiznes Volochysk		(Ukraine) Serhiy Kovalets	Obolon-Brovar Kyiv	
Round 11	(Ukraine) Oleksandr Mishurenko	Inhulets Petrove		(Ukraine) Serhiy Lavrynenko (2)	Inhulets Petrove	
Round 12	(Georgia (country)) Nika Sichinava	Inhulets Petrove		(Ukraine) Ihor Zhabchenko	Hirnyk-Sport Horishni Plavni	
Round 13	(Ukraine) Oleksandr Batalskyi	Obolon-Brovar Kyiv		(Ukraine) Serhiy Kovalets (2)	Obolon-Brovar Kyiv	
Round 14	(Ukraine) Denys Kozhanov	Volyn Lutsk		(Ukraine) Oleksandr Ivanov	Ahrobiznes Volochysk	
Round 15	(Ukraine) Yaroslav Konkolnyak	Prykarpattia Ivano-Frankivsk		(Ukraine) Serhiy Kovalets (3)	Obolon-Brovar Kyiv	
Round 16	(Ukraine) Dmytro Kozban	Kremin Kremenchuk		(Ukraine) Volodymyr Prokopynenko	Kremin Kremenchuk	
Round 17	(Ukraine) Bohdan Mohylnyi	Metalurh Zaporizhya		(Ukraine) Andriy Tlumak	Volyn Lutsk	
Round 18	(Ukraine) Yuriy Batyushyn	Hirnyk-Sport Horishni Plavni		(Ukraine) Ihor Zhabchenko (2)	Hirnyk-Sport Horishni Plavni	
Round 19	(Ukraine) Andriy Kukharuk	Ahrobiznes Volochysk		(Ukraine) Oleksandr Ivanov (2)	Ahrobiznes Volochysk	
winter break
Round 20	(Ukraine) Vladyslav Klymenko	Chornomorets Odesa		(Ukraine) Serhiy Kovalets (4)	Chornomorets Odesa	
Round 21	(Brazil) Derek	Metalist 1925 Kharkiv		(Ukraine) Andriy Demchenko (2)	Metalist 1925 Kharkiv	
Round 22	(Ukraine) Oleksandr Batalskyi	Obolon-Brovar Kyiv		(Ukraine) Oleksandr Chyzhevskyi	Ahrobiznes Volochysk	
Round 23	(Ukraine) Serhiy Herasymets	Hirnyk-Sport Horishni Plavni		(Ukraine) Ihor Zhabchenko (3)	Hirnyk-Sport Horishni Plavni	
Round 24	(Ukraine) Dmytro Sula	Kremin Kremenchuk		(Ukraine) Oleksandr Kosevych (3)	Avanhard Kramatorsk	
Round 25	(Ukraine) Denys Yanakov	Chornomorets Odesa		(Ukraine) Serhiy Lavrynenko (3)	Inhulets Petrove	
Round 26	(Ukraine) Andriy Kukharuk	Ahrobiznes Volochysk		(Ukraine) Oleksandr Chyzhevskyi (2)	Ahrobiznes Volochysk	
Round 27	(Ukraine) Vadym Yavorskyi	MFC Mykolaiv		(Ukraine) Illia Blyzniuk	MFC Mykolaiv	
Round 28	(Tanzania) Yohana Oscar Mkomola	Inhulets Petrove		(Ukraine) Oleksiy Hodin	Metalurh Zaporizhya	
Round 29	(Ukraine) Artur Riabov	Volyn Lutsk		(Ukraine) Oleksandr Chyzhevskyi (3)	Ahrobiznes Volochysk	
Round 30	(Ukraine) Ruslan Palamar	MFC Mykolaiv		(Ukraine) Vasyl Kobin (3)	FC Mynai	

Notes:

- After the winter break and its extension due to the COVID-19, the PFL also started to publicize several additional league's awards, among which are best goalkeeper, best rookie, best substitution ("round joker"), and round goal.

=== Season awards ===
The laureates of the 2019–20 season were:

- Best player: (Georgia (country)) Nika Sichinava (Inhulets Petrove)
- Top goalscorer: (Ukraine) Denys Kozhanov (Volyn Lutsk)

== Number of teams by region ==
Number	Region	Team(s)
2	Odesa Oblast	Chornomorets and Balkany
2	Poltava Oblast	Kremin and Hirnyk
1	Kyiv	Obolon-Brovar
1	Cherkasy Oblast	Cherkashchyna
1	Donetsk Oblast	Avanhard
1	Ivano-Frankivsk Oblast	Prykarpattia
1	Kharkiv Oblast	Metalist 1925
1	Khmelnytskyi Oblast	Ahrobiznes
1	Kirovohrad Oblast	Inhulets
1	Lviv Oblast	Rukh
1	Mykolaiv Oblast	Mykolaiv
1	Volyn Oblast	Volyn
1	Zakarpattia Oblast	Mynai
1	Zaporizhia Oblast	Metalurh

== Attendance ==
According to research by the Ukrainian website SportArena the official reported attendance in the league could be inaccurate if not completely wrong.

== See also ==
- 2019–20 Ukrainian Premier League
- 2019–20 Ukrainian Second League
- 2019–20 Ukrainian Football Amateur League
- 2019–20 Ukrainian Cup
- List of Ukrainian football transfers summer 2019
- List of Ukrainian football transfers winter 2019–20
