= 2019–20 FC Chornomorets Odesa season =

FC Chornomorets Odesa
2019–20 season
- General Director: Anatoly Mysyura
- Manager: Angel Chervenkov (until September 16, 2019); Vitaliy Starovik (caretaker until October 13, 2019); Ostap Markevych (until May 12, 2020); Serhiy Kovalets (from May 13, 2020)
- Stadium: Chornomorets Stadium
- Ukrainian First League: 10th of 16
- Ukrainian Cup: Round of 32 (1/16)
- Top goalscorer: Volodymyr Arzhanov (4); Denys Yanakov (4)
Home colours	Away colours	Third colours

The 2019–20 season was the 82nd season in the club's history and the 29th season of Odesa football club "Chornomorets" in the domestic league/cup of Ukraine. "The Sailors" competed in the 2019–20 Ukrainian First League and 2019–20 Ukrainian Cup.

== Season overview ==
=== July 2019 ===
- July 27, 2019 "Chornomorets" successfully started a new season. In the first round of the national championship among the teams of the first league Odesa team played in Cherkasy, where it beat 3:1 local club "Cherkashchyna". Kostyantyn Yaroshenko scored his first goal as a player of "Chornomorets".

=== August 2019 ===
- August 3, 2019 The second round match of the championship of Ukraine "sailors" played at home, where they beat 3:1 the team "Girnyk-Sport" (Horishni Plavni).
- August 10, 2019 In the third round of the national championship, "Chornomorets" played in the village of Mynai, where he lost 0:1 to the local club of the same name. It was the first defeat of "Chornomorets" in the official matches of the current season.
- August 17, 2019 The fourth round match of the championship of Ukraine "sailors" played at home, where they lost 0:1 to the club "Avangard" from the city of Kramatorsk. For the first time in the current season, the Odesa team lost an official match on their home stadium.
- August 24, 2019 In the fifth round of the national championship "Chornomorets" played in Lutsk, where he lost 2:3 to local "Volyn". It was the third consecutive defeat of the Odesa team in the current season.
- August 30, 2019 The match of the sixth round of the championship of Ukraine "sailors" played at home, where they beat 3:2 the team "Prykarpattya" (Ivano-Frankivsk). It was the third consecutive victory of the Odesa team in the current season when it scored three goals.

=== September 2019 ===
- September 4, 2019 In the seventh round of the national championship "Chornomorets" played 0:0 in the city of Mykolaiv with the local team of the same name.
- September 8, 2019 Sailors' match of the eighth round of the Ukrainian championship was played in Lviv, where they lost 0:2 to local club "Rukh".
- September 14, 2019 In the ninth round of the national championship "Chornomorets" at home lost 0:1 to club "Obolon-Brovar".
- September 21, 2019 The match of the tenth round of the championship of Ukraine "sailors" played in Poltava, where they beat 4:2 the team "Kremin" from Kremenchuk. It was the first official match of the Odesa team coached by Vitaliy Starovik.
- September 25, 2019 "Chornomorets" lost 0:1 game of the 1/16 round of the Ukrainian Cup 2019/20 against the team "Mykolaiv" and dropped out of this tournament.
- September 29, 2019 In the eleventh round of the national championship Odesa team at home lost 0:3 to the club "Ingulets". For the first time in the season, the "sailors" were defeated with big score.

=== October 2019 ===
- October 2, 2019 The Odesa team started in October 2019 with a friendly game in Chișinău, where it played 1:1 against the team of clubs in Moldova.
- October 5, 2019 Match of the twelfth round of the Championship of Ukraine "sailors" played in the village of Zorya, where they met with the club "Balkany". In the 71st minute (score was 1:1 at the moment), the game was interrupted by a scuffle.
- October 12, 2019 In the thirteenth round of the national championship "Chornomorets" at home played 0:0 against "Metalist 1925" from Kharkiv.
- October 19, 2019 The fourteenth round match of the Championship of Ukraine "sailors" played in the city of Volochysk, where they lost 0:2 to the local club "Ahrobiznes". It was the first official match of the Odesa team coached by Ostap Markevych.
- October 26, 2019 In the fifteenth round of the national championship "Chornomorets" at home with a score of 1:0 beat MFC "Metalurh" from Zaporizhzhia. Andriy Tkachuk scored his first goal of the "sailors".
- October 30, 2019 "Chornomorets" and "Balkany" finished the match of the twelfth round of the Ukrainian championship, which was interrupted by a bout. The game ended 1:1.

=== November 2019 ===
- November 3, 2019 In the sixteenth round of the national championship "Chornomorets" at home with the score 2:1 defeated the team "Cherkashchyna". Denys Norenkov and Vladyslav Khamelyuk score their first goals in the Odesa team.
- November 9, 2019 Match of the seventeenth round of the Ukrainian championship "sailors" played in the city of Horishni Plavni, where they lost 0:3 to the local club "Hirnyk-Sport".
- November 16, 2019 In the eighteenth round of the national championship "Chornomorets" played at home 1:1 against the team "Mynaj".
- November 23, 2019 The last official match of 2019 "sailors" played in the city of Kramatorsk, where in the match of the nineteenth round of the Ukrainian championship they lost 1:3 to the local club "Avanhard". Andriy Shtohrin scored his first goal in the Odesa team.

=== March 2020 ===
- March 17, 2020 Ukraine interrupted national football competitions because of the coronavirus pandemic.

=== May 2020 ===
- May 21, 2020 At the PFL council, the representatives of the first league clubs voted against the warm-up of the Ukrainian first league championship according to the rules in full.

=== June 2020 ===
- June 12, 2020 UAF executive committee approved a decision about Ukrainian championship 2019/20 on continuation of the first and completion of the second League, adopted on June 11, 2020 at the PFL conference.
- June 25, 2020 The first official match of 2020 "sailors" played at home, where in the twentieth round of the Ukrainian championship they defeated 5:2 "Volyn". Avagimyan, Klimenko, Yanakov, Yalovenko (2) scored their first goals for the Odesa team.
- June 30, 2020 In the game of the 21st round of the national championship "Chornomorets" in the city of Ivano-Frankivsk beat 1:0 the local club "Prykarpattia".

=== July 2020 ===
- July 5, 2020 Match of the 22nd round of the championship of Ukraine «sailors» at home played 0:0 against the team of MFC "Mykolaiv".
- July 11, 2020 In the game of the 23rd round of the national championship "Chornomorets" drew at home (2:2) with Lviv club "Rukh". Maxim Bragaru scored his first goal for the Odesa team.
- July 15, 2020 Match of the 24th round of the Ukrainian championship was played by «sailors» in Kyiv, where they lost 0:1 to the local team "Obolon-Brovar".
- July 19, 2020 In the game of the 25th round of the national championship "Chornomorets" beat "Kremin" from the city of Kremenchuk at home with a big score (5:0). Ihor Sikorskyi scored his first goals (2) for the Odesa team.
- July 23, 2020 Match of the 26th round of the Ukrainian championship «sailors» played 0:0 in Petrove against the local team "Ingulets".
- July 28, 2020 In the game of the 27th round of the national championship "Chornomorets" drew at home (2:2) against the club "Balkany" (Zorya).

=== August 2020 ===
- August 3, 2020 Match of the 28th round of the Ukrainian championship «sailors» played 0:0 in Kharkiv against the local team "Metalist 1925".
- August 7, 2020 In the game of the 29th round of the national championship "Chornomorets" at home lost 0:1 to the team "Ahrobiznes" from the city of Volochysk.
- August 13, 2020 The last official match of the 2019/20 season "sailors" played in the city of Zaporizhzhia, where in the match of 30th round of the Ukrainian championship they defeated 4:1 the local club MFC "Metalurh". Oleksandr Mykhaylichenko scored his first goal for the Odesa team.
