= Kukharuk =

Ukrainian surname meaning "son of kukhar" i.e., "son of cook".

- Andriy Kukharuk, Ukrainian professional footballer
- Ruslan Kukharuk, Russian statesman and politician
