= Volodymyr Arzhanov =

Ukrainian midfielder (born 1985)

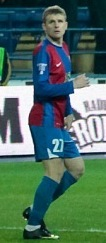

Personal information
- Full name: Volodymyr Oleksandrovych Arzhanov
- Date of birth: 29 November 1985 (age 40)
- Place of birth: Zaporizhzhia, Soviet Union (now Ukraine)
- Height: 1.81 m (5 ft 11 in)
- Position: Midfielder

Senior career*
Years	Team	Apps	(Gls)
2002–2010	Metalurh Zaporizhzhia	104	(14)
2002–2005	Metalurh-2 Zaporizhzhia	41	(2)
2011–2013	Arsenal Kyiv	48	(9)
2012	→ Volyn Lutsk (loan)	12	(2)
2014	Chornomorets Odesa	24	(1)
2015–2016	Atyrau	64	(13)
2017–2018	Kaisar	58	(8)
2019	Chornomorets Odesa	28	(4)
2020–2021	Viktoriya Mykolaivka	43	(14)

International career
2005	Ukraine U20	3	(0)
2005	Ukraine U21	5	(0)
- * Club domestic league appearances and goals

Volodymyr Arzhanov (Ukrainian: Володимир Олександрович Аржанов; born 29 November 1985) is a Ukrainian former professional footballer who played as a midfielder. He was most recently the match analyst for Polish club Zagłębie Sosnowiec.

== Career ==
In January 2015, Arzhanov signed for Atyrau in the Kazakhstan Premier League.

In the 2019–20 season, Arzhanov played for Chornomorets Odesa and became the team's top goalscorer along with Denis Yanakov.

== See also ==
- 2005 FIFA World Youth Championship squads#Ukraine
