= Andriy Kukharuk =

Ukrainian footballer (born 1995)

Personal information
- Full name: Andriy Olehovych Kukharuk
- Date of birth: 13 December 1995 (age 30)
- Place of birth: Ternopil, Ukraine
- Height: 1.73 m (5 ft 8 in)
- Position: Midfielder

Team information
- Current team: Feniks-Mariupol
- Number: 8

Youth career
- 2008–2011: Ternopil
- 2011–2013: Sevastopol

Senior career*
Years	Team	Apps	(Gls)
2013–2014	Sevastopol	0	(0)
2013	→ Sevastopol-2	7	(0)
2015–2016	Nyva Ternopil	24	(2)
2016	Sambir	10	(1)
2016–2017	Hertha Wels	?	(?)
2017–2020	Ahrobiznes Volochysk	81	(6)
2020–2022	Rukh Lviv	26	(1)
2022	Mariupol	0	(0)
2022–2023	Inhulets Petrove	24	(0)
2023–2024	Veres Rivne	20	(0)
2024	Nyva Ternopil	14	(0)
2025	Podillya Khmelnytskyi	4	(2)
2026–	Feniks-Mariupol	11	(1)
- * Club domestic league appearances and goals as of 4 June 2026

Andriy Olehovych Kukharuk (Ukrainian: Андрій Олегович Кухарук; born 13 December 1995) is a Ukrainian professional footballer who plays as a midfielder for Feniks-Mariupol.

== Career ==
Kukharuk is a product of the FC Ternopil and FC Sevastopol youth systems.

He signed a contract with Rukh Lviv in August 2020 and made his debut against FC Vorskla Poltava on 23 August 2020 in the Ukrainian Premier League.
