= 2019–20 Ukrainian Women's Cup =

Tournament details
- Country: Ukraine
- Dates: 11 October 2019 – 30 September 2020
- Teams: 16

Final positions
- Champions: Zhytlobud-2 Kharkiv
- Runners-up: Voskhod Stara Mayachka

The 2019–20 Ukrainian Women's Cup was the 27th season of Ukrainian knockout competitions among women teams.

== Bracket ==
Round of 16
EMS-Podillya Vinnytsia	0
Zhytlobud-1 Kharkiv	5
Ateks Kyiv	0
Mariupol	5
Prykarpattia-DYuSSh-3	0
Ladomyr Volodymyr	5
Spartak-Orion Mykolaiv	1
Zhytlobud-2 Kharkiv	6
Luhanochka	1
Pantery Uman	29
KhPKSP-Zhytlobud-2	1
Voskhod S. Mayachka	6
Rodyna-Litsei Kostopil	0
Yednist Plysky	1
Bukovynska Nadia V. K.	1
Yatran Berestivets	2

Quarterfinals
Zhytlobud-1 Kharkiv	5
Mariupol	0
Ladomyr Volodymyr	-
Zhytlobud-2 Kharkiv	+
Pantery Uman	-
Voskhod S. Mayachka	+
Yednist Plysky	-
Yatran Berestivets	+

Semifinals
Zhytlobud-1 Kharkiv	0
Zhytlobud-2 Kharkiv	1
Voskhod S. Mayachka	+
Yatran Berestivets	-

Final
Zhytlobud-2 Kharkiv	1
Voskhod Stara Mayachka	0

== Competition schedule ==
=== Round of 16 ===
11 October 2019	KhPKSP-Zhytlobud-2 (II)	1–6	(I) Voskhod Stara Mayachka	Kharkiv
12:00	Tetiana Shevchenko 90'	Report	Yulia Stets 10', 14', 43'; Maria Aluko Entunde 28'; Olena Lymar 68'; Anastasia Kumeda 77'	Stadium: KhOVUFK; Attendance: 200; Referee: Veronika Vasylchenko (Tahamlyk)

13 October 2019	EMS-Podillia Vinnytsia (I)	0–5	(I) Zhytlobud-1 Kharkiv	Vinnytsia
12:00		Report	Anna Petryk 43'; Darya Apanashchenko 44'; Hanna Voronina 61'; Taisia Nesterenko 75'; Sofia Solomakha 84'	Stadium: Khimik; Attendance: 100; Referee: Sofia Prychyna

22 October 2019	Bukovynska Nadia Velykyi Kuchuriv (II)	1–2	(I) Yatran Berestivets	Chernivtsi
12:00	Oleksandra Sakal 62'	Report	Roksolana Komar 39'; Lyudmyla Kryuchkova 86'	Stadium: Olimp; Attendance: 50; Referee: Iryna Chaika

22 October 2019	Rodyna-Litsei Kostopil (I)	0–1	(I) Yednist Plysky	Kostopil, Rivne Oblast
12:00			Olesia Malinovska 33'	Stadium: Kolos; Attendance: 70; Referee: Natalia Mamchur

22 October 2019	Luhanochka (II)	1–29	(I) Pantery Uman	Sumy
	Iryna Kozub 19'		Oksana Bilokur 2', 17', 18', 21', 31', 48', 49', 65', 66', 73'; Viktoria Seremchuk 10', 16', 20', 23', 24', 27', 30', 41', 47', 60'; Diana Kovtun 11'; Ksenia Chorna 22'; Anastasia Sverdlova 33'; Aminat Aslakhanova 51'; Alina Shylova 62'; Diana Byeliakova 68'; Iryna Rybalkina 81', 83'	Stadium: Barsa FTs; Attendance: 50; Referee: Maryna Striletska

24 October 2019	Ateks Kyiv (II)	0–5	(I) Mariupol	Kyiv
12:00			Valeriy Yaretska 24'; Yana Vynokurova 31'; Lidia Lashko 59'; Olena Halak 60'; Maria Barchan 89'	Stadium: Dniprovets; Attendance: 48; Referee: Kateryna Zora

29 October 2019	Prykarpattia-DYuSSh-3 (II)	0–5	(I) Ladomyr Volodymyr	Ivano-Frankivsk
12:00	Solomia Hoshiy 35' (o.g.)	Report	Maryna Shainyuk 21', 85'; Sofia Kyslyak 29'; Nadia Ivanchenko 51'	Stadium: Rukh; Attendance: 35; Referee: Anastasia Romanyuk

3 November 2019	Spartak-Orion Mykolaiv (II)	1–6	(I) Zhytlobud-2 Kharkiv	Mykolaiv
12:00		Report	Anastasia Skorynina 15', 76'; Yana Malakhova 32', 36'; Tetiana Tril (Polyukhovych) 42'; Roksolana Kravchuk 53'	Stadium: SK Zorya; Attendance: 120; Referee: Iryna Petrova

=== Quarterfinals ===
Yednist Plysky (I)	0–3 (TR)	(I) Yatran Berestivets
	Report

Voskhod Stara Mayachka (I)	3–0 (TR)	(I) Pantery Uman
	Report

22 August 2020	Zhytlobud-1 Kharkiv (I)	5–0	(I) Mariupol	Kharkiv
11:00	Olha Ovdiychuk 1', 28'; Olha Boychenko 20', 27', 44'	Report		Stadium: Metalist training center Attendance: 0 Referee: Kateryna Usova

Zhytlobud-2 Kharkiv (I)	3–0 (TR)	(I) Ladomyr Volodymyr
	Report

=== Semifinals ===
2 September 2020	Zhytlobud-1 Kharkiv (I)	0–1	(I) Zhytlobud-2 Kharkiv	Kharkiv
17:00		Report	62' Yana Malakhova	Stadium: Metalist training center Attendance: 0 Referee: Lyudmyla Telbukh

2 September 2020	Voskhod Stara Mayachka (I)	3–0 (TR)	(I) Yatran Berestivets
		Report

=== Final ===
30 September 2020	Voskhod Stara Mayachka (I)	0–1	(I) Zhytlobud-2 Kharkiv	Kharkiv
14:00		Report	35' Yana Malakhova	Stadium: Sonyachnyi; Attendance: 0 Referee: Kateryna Usova

== See also ==
- 2019–20 Ukrainian Women's League
- 2019–20 Ukrainian Cup
