= Denys Yanakov =

Ukrainian footballer

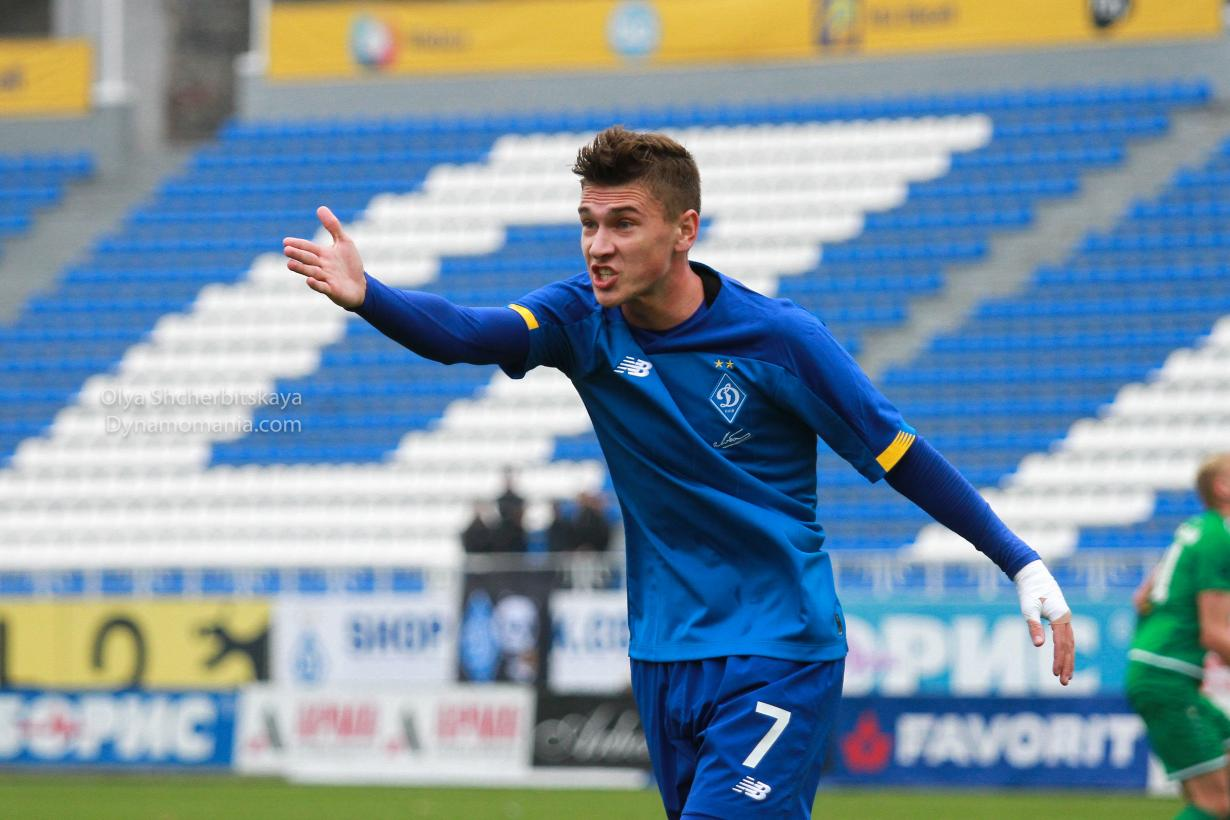

Personal information
- Full name: Denys Oleksiyovych Yanakov
- Date of birth: 1 January 1999 (age 27)
- Place of birth: Zaporizhzhia, Ukraine
- Height: 1.80 m (5 ft 11 in)
- Position: Left winger

Team information
- Current team: Fratria
- Number: 7

Youth career
- –2018: Dynamo Kyiv

Senior career*
Years	Team	Apps	(Gls)
2017–2018	Dynamo-2 Kyiv	4	(0)
2018–2020	Dynamo Kyiv	0	(0)
2018–2019	→ Arsenal Kyiv (loan)	4	(0)
2020	→ Chornomorets Odesa (loan)	8	(4)
2020–2022	Zorya Luhansk	2	(0)
2020–2021	→ Inhulets Petrove (loan)	12	(3)
2021–2022	→ Polissya Zhytomyr (loan)	6	(1)
2022–2024	Polissya Zhytomyr	24	(7)
2024	→ Veres Rivne (loan)	6	(1)
2024–2025	Chornomorets Odesa	26	(5)
2025	Epitsentr Kamianets-Podilskyi	7	(0)
2026	Unirea Slobozia	10	(1)
2026–	Fratria	8	(0)

International career
2015–2016	Ukraine U17	8	(1)
2016–2017	Ukraine U18	4	(0)
2017–2018	Ukraine U19	6	(1)
- * Club domestic league appearances and goals as of 09:30, 8 September 2026 (UTC)

Denys Oleksiyovych Yanakov (Ukrainian: Денис Олексійович Янаков; born 1 January 1999) is a Ukrainian professional footballer who plays as left winger for Fratria.

== Club career ==
In the 2019–20 season, Yanakov played on loan for Chornomorets Odesa and became the team's top goalscorer along with Volodymyr Arzhanov. In the 2024–25 season, Yanakov played for Chornomorets Odesa again and for the second time became the team's top goalscorer.

On 22 July 2024 Yanakov joined Chornomorets Odesa.

On 3 July 2025 was announced that Yanakov joined Epitsentr Kamianets-Podilskyi.

On 9 July 2026 Yanakov moved to Bulgaria and signed for Fratria.

== International career ==
In May 2016, Yanakov took part in the 2016 UEFA European Under-17 Championship held in Azerbaijan. He played three matches at the tournament, in which he scored one goal against his peers from Germany.

== Honours ==
Polissya Zhytomyr

- Ukrainian First League: 2022–23
