= Ivan Bohatyr =

Ukrainian footballer and manager

Personal information
- Full name: Ivan Oleksandrovych Bohatyr
- Date of birth: 24 April 1975 (age 51)
- Place of birth: Zaporizhzhia, Ukrainian SSR, Soviet Union
- Height: 1.72 m (5 ft 7 1/2 in)
- Positions: Defender; midfielder

Senior career*
Years	Team	Apps	(Gls)
1993–1994	Viktor Zaporizhzhia	35	(6)
1993–1994	→ Nyva-Viktor Novomykolaivka	9	(0)
1994–2002	Metalurh Zaporizhzhia	152	(6)
1995	→ Viktor Zaporizhzhia	1	(0)
1998–2002	→ Metalurh-2 Zaporizhzhia	25	(2)
2000	→ SSSOR-Metalurh Zaporizhzhia	1	(0)
2002	Tavriya Simferopol	8	(0)
2003	Metalist Kharkiv	13	(0)
2003	Metalurh Zaporizhzhia	10	(0)
2004	MFC Mykolaiv	9	(0)
2004–2005	PFC Oleksandriya	19	(0)
2005–2007	Desna Chernihiv	36	(0)
2013–2014	Vektor Bohatyrivka	3	(0)

International career
1996–1997	Ukraine U-21	5	(0)

Managerial career
- 2007–2008: Hirnyk-Sport Komsomolsk (assistant)
- 2008–2013: Metalurh Zaporizhzhia (academy)
- 2019: Metalurh Zaporizhzhia
- * Club domestic league appearances and goals

Ivan Bohatyr (Ukrainian: Іван Олександрович Богатир; born 24 April 1975) is a former Ukrainian footballer and Ukrainian football manager.

In 1994–2002 he played for FC Metalurh Zaporizhzhia.
