= Ihor Sikorskyi =

Ukrainian footballer

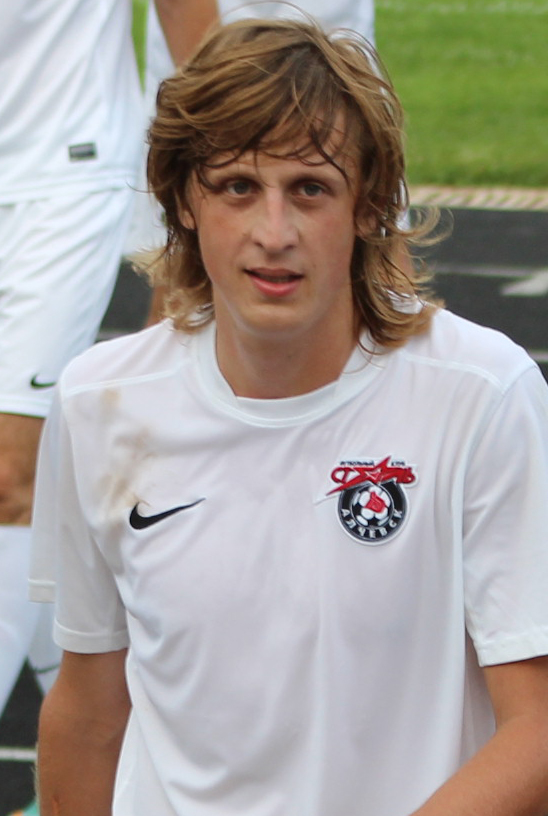

Personal information
- Full name: Ihor Oleksandrovych Sikorskyi
- Date of birth: 29 July 1988 (age 38)
- Place of birth: Kyiv, Soviet Union (now Ukraine)
- Height: 1.85 m (6 ft 1 in)
- Position: Midfielder

Team information
- Current team: Juniors Shpytky

Youth career
- 2001–2003: RVUFK Kyiv
- 2003: KDYuSSh-14 Kyiv
- 2003–2004: RVUFK Kyiv
- 2004: KDYuSSh-15 Kyiv
- 2004: Lokomotyv Kyiv
- 2005: KDYuSSh-15 Kyiv

Senior career*
Years	Team	Apps	(Gls)
2005–2006	KDYuSSh-15 Kyiv (amateurs)	1	(0)
2007	Batkivshchyna Kyiv (amateurs)	0	(0)
2008–2010	Zorya Luhansk	8	(0)
2010–2014	Stal Alchevsk	101	(6)
2014	Daugava Daugavpils	3	(0)
2014–2015	Helios Kharkiv	14	(0)
2015–2016	Mykolaiv	25	(7)
2016–2017	Veres Rivne	25	(6)
2017–2018	Mykolaiv	32	(9)
2018–2019	Hirnyk-Sport Horishni Plavni	21	(5)
2019	Sheikh Russel		
2019	Patriot Baryshiv Raion (amateurs)	5	(5)
2019	Ahrobiznes Volochysk	19	(8)
2020	Chornomorets Odesa	12	(3)
2020	Volyn Lutsk	10	(4)
2021	Metal Kharkiv	6	(1)
2021	Peremoha Dnipro	2	(0)
2021–	Juniors Shpytky (amateurs)	0	(0)
- * Club domestic league appearances and goals as of 13 October 2021

Ihor Oleksandrovych Sikorskyi (born 29 July 1988) is a Ukrainian amateur football striker who plays for Juniors Shpytky.

== Career ==
In January 2020 he was expelled from the club Ahrobiznes Volochysk after a trip to Russia to visit his relatives during the Russo-Ukrainian War. Sikorskyi expressed his surprise with the decision of the club, because other sportsmen used to visit Russia without problems, but he did not contest club's action.
