= Yan Osadchyi =

Ukrainian footballer

Personal information
- Full name: Yan Serhiyovych Osadchyi
- Date of birth: 1 January 1994 (age 32)
- Place of birth: Sumy, Ukraine
- Height: 1.83 m (6 ft 0 in)
- Position: Right back

Team information
- Current team: Redditch United

Youth career
- 2007–2009: Metalist Kharkiv
- 2009–2010: Arsenal Kharkiv
- 2010–2011: Metalurh Donetsk

Senior career*
Years	Team	Apps	(Gls)
2012–2017	Solli Plyus Kharkiv	52	(2)
2017–2018	Ahrobiznes TSK Romny	25	(3)
2018–2022	Alians Lypova Dolyna	56	(2)
2022–	Redditch United	0	(0)
- * Club domestic league appearances and goals as of 20 July 2022

Yan Serhiyovych Osadchyi (Ukrainian: Ян Сергійович Осадчий; born 1 January 1994) is a Ukrainian professional footballer who plays as a right back for club Redditch United.

== Career ==
In July 2022, Osadchyi joined Southern League Premier Division Central club Redditch United after impressing the club on trial. The move came after Osadchyi fled his native country to settle in Worcester with his partner following the Russian invasion of Ukraine.
