= Serhiy Kovalets =

Ukrainian footballer

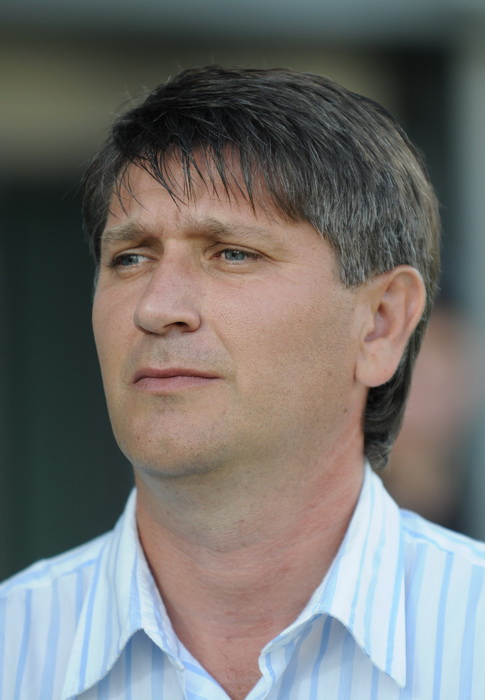

Personal information
- Full name: Serhiy Ivanovych Kovalets
- Date of birth: 5 September 1968 (age 58)
- Place of birth: Chekhove, Crimean Oblast, Ukrainian SSR
- Height: 1.78 m (5 ft 10 in)
- Position: Midfielder

Team information
- Current team: Metalurh Zaporizhzhia (manager)

Youth career
- DYuSSh Krasyliv
- Sluch Krasyliv
- Zirka Berdychiv

Senior career*
Years	Team	Apps	(Gls)
1986	Podillya Khmelnytskyi	25	(0)
1987	Zirka Berdychiv		(9)
1989	Podillya Khmelnytskyi	49	(11)
1990–1994	Dynamo Kyiv	118	(13)
1995–1996	Dnipro Dnipropetrovsk	30	(3)
1996	→ Twente (loan)	0	(0)
1996–1997	Chornomorets Odesa	11	(4)
1997	Dnipro Dnipropetrovsk	1	(1)
1997–2000	Karpaty Lviv	62	(8)
1997–1999	→ Karpaty-2 Lviv	14	(5)
2000–2002	Metalurh Zaporizhzhia	31	(3)
2000	→ Metalurh-2 Zaporizhzhia	4	(2)
2002–2003	Obolon Kyiv	27	(2)
2002	→ Obolon-2 Kyiv	2	(1)
2003	Krasyliv-Obolon Krasyliv	5	(1)
2003–2004	Volyn Lutsk	8	(1)
2004–2005	Borysfen Boryspil	3	(0)
Total		390	(57)

International career
1992–1994	Ukraine	10	(0)

Managerial career
- 2005–2008: Metalist Kharkiv (assistant)
- 2008–2009: Lviv
- 2009: Oleksandriya
- 2010–2011: Obolon Kyiv
- 2012: Tatran Prešov
- 2012: Metalurh Zaporizhzhia
- 2013–2015: Ukraine U-21
- 2016: Trakai
- 2017–2018: Tatran Prešov
- 2018–2020: Obolon-Brovar Kyiv
- 2020–2021: Chornomorets Odesa
- 2021–2022: Polissya Stavky (amateurs)
- 2022–2023: Inhulets Petrove
- 2024–2025: Podillya Khmelnytskyi
- 2026–: Metalurh Zaporizhzhia
- * Club domestic league appearances and goals

Serhiy Ivanovych Kovalets (Ukrainian: Сергій Іванович Ковалець; born 5 September 1968) is a Ukrainian former footballer who recently is a manager of Metalurh Zaporizhzhia.

== Playing career ==
Kovalets began his playing career in youth sports schools of Podolia region Berdychiv and Krasyliv. Since 1984 he played for the senior squad of the local football team Sluch Krasyliv that competed in the regional competitions of Khmelnytskyi Oblast. Next year he was invited to the team of masters Podillia Khmelnytskyi that was playing in the Soviet Second League (third tier). During that time, he also was called to serve his obligatory military service playing for amateur team out of Berdychiv led by Miletiy Balchos. In 1990 Kovalets accepted invitation from Oleh Bazylevych to join the "flagman" of Ukrainian and Soviet football FC Dynamo Kyiv.

Eventually he played 10 matches for Ukraine between 1992 and 1994.

== Coaching career ==
After he retired from playing football, Metalist Kharkiv head coach Myron Markevych invited Kovalets to work with him as an assistant coach in 2005. In 2008, Kovalets became the head coach of the newly promoted FC Lviv, who had an unsuccessful start in the Ukrainian Premier League. Kovalets failed to accomplish his task of keeping his team in the Premier League, which ended up losing to Illichivets in goal difference.

At the end of August 2009, Kovalets became the new head coach of PFC Oleksandria in the Ukrainian First League. He held this position until Yuriy Maksymov left Obolon during the winter break of 2009–10 Ukrainian Premier League season when he was offered the position. He was sacked after a 1–0 defeat at Chornomorets Odesa on 31 November. On 18 January 2012, Kovalets was appointed as the new manager of 1. FC Tatran Prešov.

== Personal life ==
Kovalets was born in Chekhove, Crimean Oblast, Ukrainian SSR, Soviet Union, now Ukraine. He is married since 1988. Together with his wife Anzhela has three children: daughters Alina (1989) and Daryna (1998) and also one son, current professional footballer Kyrylo (1993).

== Honours ==
=== Player ===
- Soviet Top League Champion: 1990
- USSR Cup: 1990
- Ukrainian Premier League Champion: 1992–93
- Ukrainian Premier League Champion: 1993–94
- Ukrainian Cup: 1993

=== Coach ===
Winner (1): Commonwealth of Independent States Cup: 2014
Runner Up (1): Commonwealth of Independent States Cup: 2013
