= Volodymyr Prokopynenko =

Ukrainian footballer and coach

Personal information
- Full name: Volodymyr Yuriyovych Prokopynenko
- Date of birth: 8 November 1962 (age 63)
- Place of birth: Ukrainian SSR, Soviet Union
- Position: Midfielder

Senior career*
Years	Team	Apps	(Gls)
1980–1982	Kolos Poltava	63	(4)
1983	Kooperator Poltava		
1984	Metalist Kharkiv	0	(0)
1984–1992	Vorskla Poltava	248	(26)
1992–1993	Bulgaria		
1993–1994	Naftokhimik Kremenchuk	47	(5)
1997	Lokomotyv Znamyanka	1	(0)
1998–1999	Mayak Rokyta		

Managerial career
- 2005–2008: Vorskla Poltava (administrator)
- 2008–2012: Vorskla Poltava (reserves assistant)
- 2012–2014: Vorskla Poltava (reserves)
- 2017: FC Poltava
- 2019: Kremin Kremenchuk (caretaker)
- 2019–2020: Kremin Kremenchuk
- 2020–2021: Speranța Nisporeni
- 2024–: FC Trostianets (caretaker)
- * Club domestic league appearances and goals

Volodymyr Prokopynenko (Ukrainian: Володимир Юрійович Прокопиненко; born 8 November 1962) is a Ukrainian coach Speranța Nisporeni of Moldovan National Division and former footballer. His name also spelled in Ukrainian media as Prokopinenko (Russian-like version).

Prokopynenko is better known playing for FC Vorskla Poltava with which he started back in 1980. He also spent some time in FC Naftokhimik Kremenchuk that competed in lower leagues.

After retiring, Prokopynenko returned to FC Vorskla Poltava where he managed reserve teams. In 2017 he was appointed the head coach of FC Poltava.
