= Oleksandr Ivanov =

Ukrainian coach and footballer

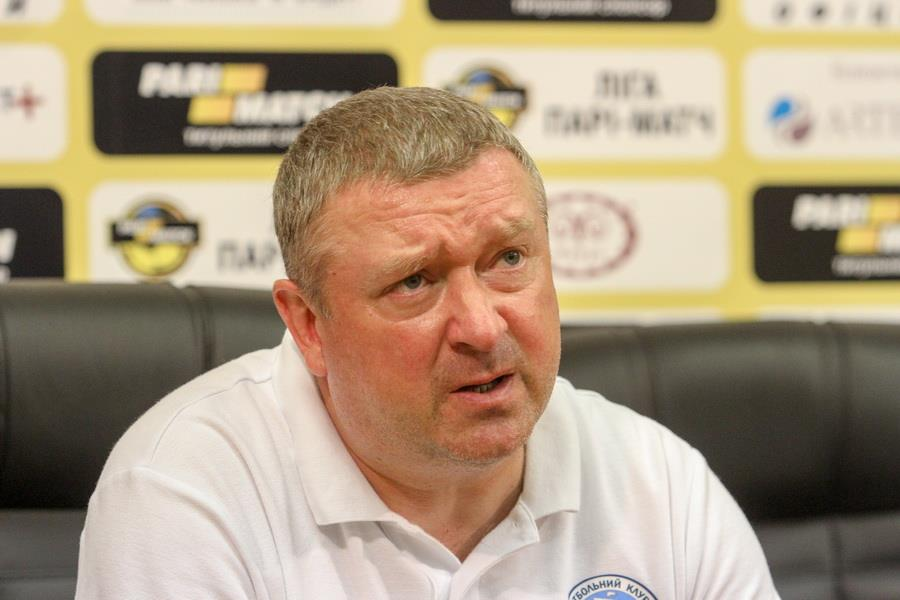
- Ivanov in 2015

Personal information
- Full name: Oleksandr Mykhaylovych Ivanov
- Date of birth: 23 November 1965 (age 60)
- Place of birth: Kharkiv, Ukrainian SSR, Soviet Union
- Height: 1.76 m (5 ft 9 1/2 in)
- Positions: Striker; midfielder

Youth career
- Metalist Kharkiv

Senior career*
Years	Team	Apps	(Gls)
1981–1991	Metalist Kharkiv	117	(3)
1991	Turun Palloseura	9	(2)
1992	Dynamo-2 Kyiv	2	(0)
1992	Torpedo Zaporizhia	10	(1)
1993	Vorskla Poltava	10	(2)
1993	Borysfen Boryspil	13	(2)
1994	SBTS Sumy	15	(0)
1994	Mykolaiv	1	(0)
1995	Avangard-Kortek Kolomna	33	(0)
1995–1996	Ahrotekhservis Sumy	7	(0)
1996–1997	Dunaferr	13	(0)
1997–1998	Verkhovyna Uzhhorod	16	(0)
Total		246	(10)

Managerial career
- 1998–2001: Arsenal Kharkiv (assistant)
- 2003–2014: Metalist Kharkiv (assistant)
- 2014–2016: Dnipro Dnipropetrovsk (assistant)
- 2016–2017: Rukh Vynnyky (assistant)
- 2017–2018: Metalist 1925 Kharkiv
- 2019: Ahrobiznes Volochysk (interim)
- 2019–2020: Chornomorets Odesa (assistant)
- 2020–2022: Mariupol (assistant)
Medal record
Men's football
Representing Soviet Union
UEFA European U-19 Championships
Runner-up	1984 Soviet Union
- * Club domestic league appearances and goals

Oleksandr Mykhailovych Ivanov (Ukrainian: Олександр Михайлович Іванов; born 23 November 1965) is a Ukrainian professional football coach and a former player.

== Career ==
Since 2014 till 2016, he worked as an assistant coach with FC Dnipro Dnipropetrovsk.

He played 4 games in the European Cup Winners' Cup 1988–89 for FC Metalist Kharkiv.

== Honours ==
- Soviet Cup winner: 1988.
- USSR Federation Cup finalist: 1987, 1989.
