= FC Mariupol =

Defunct association football club based in Mariupol, Ukraine

Mariupol
- Full name: Football Club Mariupol
- Founded: 1960; 66 years ago
- Dissolved: 2022; 4 years ago
- Ground: Volodymyr Boyko Stadium, Mariupol
- Capacity: 12,680
- President: Tariq Mahmud Chaudhry
- Head coach: Ostap Markevych
- League: Suspended
- 2021–22: Ukrainian Premier League, 16th (season canceled)
- Website: fcmariupol.com
| Home colours | Away colours |

Football Club Mariupol (Ukrainian: Футбольний клуб "Маріуполь" [fʊdˈbɔlʲnɪj ˈklub mɐr⁽ʲ⁾iˈupolʲ]) was a Ukrainian professional football club based in Mariupol, that competed in the Ukrainian Premier League. The club dropped from competitions as a result of the Siege of Mariupol, during the 2022 Russian invasion of Ukraine. As a result of the Russian invasion, all of the team's sporting infrastructure was destroyed, but in May 2022 its formal membership in the Premier League was reconfirmed. In October 2025 the club was officially disqualified from the Ukrainian League.

In 2023 the Brazilian club AA Batel, whose local community is more than 70% Ukrainian or of Ukrainian descent, adopted the name, colours, and badge of the Ukrainian club.

From 2002 to 2017, the club was named Illichivets Mariupol under which it participated in European competitions. It was renamed as part of decommunization in Ukraine.

== History ==
=== Metalurh Zhdanov ===
Previously the city of Mariupol hosted a football team that competed consistently in Ukrainian republican competitions among teams of physical culture (amateur teams). The first mentioning of a Mariupol team could be traced to 1936 when it lost to Dynamo Kryvyi Rih 0:5 as part of the 1936 Soviet Cup. Next season, in 1937, it was seeded to play against another team from Berdyansk as part of the Ukrainian championship, but did not appear for the game and was eliminated. After that there is no evidence a team that represented the city until after World War II. After the war, Mariupol sometimes was represented by two teams, but usually the main was named Metalurh Zhdanov. At the end of 1958 it was renamed into Avanhard Zhdanov.

=== Azovstal and Azovets ===
Football Club Mariupol traces its history to 1960, when it was established as Azovstal based on a former two teams of physical culture (a type of Soviet amateur clubs) FC Avanhard Zhdanov and FC Shakhtar Rutchenkove.

The new team of masters Azovstal Zhdanov sponsored by the local Azovstal iron and steel works was admitted to Soviet competitions for teams of masters in Class B (at that time the second division). It was eliminated soon in 1964. After skipping one season the club again was admitted for the 1966 Soviet competitions for teams of masters in Class B, now as Azovets. During that time the club stayed in professional competitions a little bit longer and in 1971 changed its name to more recognizable Metalurh. However, soon after changing its name in 1973, the club again was relegated and now for a much longer period of time.

=== Lokomotyv and Novator ===
Missing the 1974 season, the club returned to republican competitions in 1975 as Lokomotyv, sponsored now by "Azovmash" which specializes in production of railroad cars as well as mining and metallurgical heavy equipment. Soon before the final collapse of the Soviet Union, the club already playing as Novator was relegated in 1989 to Ukrainian amateur competitions. In 1991 Novator became a champion of the Ukrainian football championship among amateur clubs. Due to reformation of the Ukrainian football competitions, the new amateur champion was admitted to the newly formed Ukrainian First League.

=== Ukrainian professional club in Mariupol ===
After the dissolution of the Soviet Union in 1992, the club changed its name to old one Azovets (part of the Azovmash's SC Novator). In summer of 1995 it merged with FC Dynamo Luhansk and during following spring changed its name again to Metalurh.

FC Metalurh Mariupol changed its name to Illichivets during the winter break of the 2002–2003 season when the club was acquired by the Illich Steel and Iron Works.

Illichivets were relegated to Ukrainian First League in the 2006–07 season after finishing 15th (out of 16). However, they returned to the Ukrainian Premier League the following season after finishing as champions in the 2007–08 Ukrainian First League.

Due to the 2014 Russian military intervention in Ukraine, the club was forced to play its home games in Dnipropetrovsk during the 2014-15 season.

=== FC Mariupol ===
In 2017 as part of the ongoing decommunization process of Ukraine, the club changed its name of Illichivets to simply FC Mariupol, officially adopting on 14 June 2017 for the 2017–18 Ukrainian Premier League season. Its name came from the Illichivets steelworks, which were named after Vladimir Ilyich Lenin.

=== Name change ===
- 1960–1966: Azovstal, 6 years
- 1966–1971: Azovets, 5 years
- 1971–1974: Metallurg, 3 years
- 1974–1976: Lokomotiv, 2 years
- 1977–1992: Novator, 15 years
- 1992–1996: Azovets, 4 years (repeated, in overall 9 years)
- 1996–2002: Metalurh, 6 years (repeated, in overall 9 years)
- 2002–2017: Illichivets, 15 years
- 2017–2022: FC Mariupol

== Crest history ==
Logo of the original owner Azovstal iron and steel works

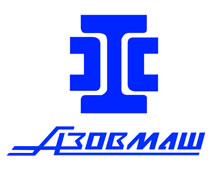
Logo of Azovmash, the owner of SC Novator in 1974-1992

Logo of the Illich Steel and Iron Works

== Honours ==
- Ukrainian Premier League U–21
  - Winners (1): 2013–14
- Ukrainian First League
  - Winners (2): 2007–08, 2016–17
- Ukrainian Second League
  - Winners (1): 1995–96
- Ukrainian amateur championship
  - Winners (2): 1974, 1991

=== Football kits and sponsors ===
| Years | Football kit | Shirt sponsor |
|---|---|---|
| 1998–1999 | Adidas | – |
| 1999–2000 | Nike | – |
| 2000–2001 | Adidas | – |
| 2001–2002 | Nike | SKAB |
| 2002–2003 | Nike/lotto | – |
| 2003–2007 | Lotto | – |
| 2008–2010 | Adidas | – |
| 2010–2011 | Adidas/Nike | – |
| 2011–2014 | Nike | – |
| 2014–2022 | Nike | AIG |

== Coaches and administration ==
| Administration | Coaching (senior team) | Coaching (U-21 team) |
|---|---|---|
| President – (United Kingdom) Tariq Mehmood Chaudhry; Vice-president – Hamza Shafeeq Rahman; Executive director – Anwar Arif Abbasi; Sports director – Farooq Ali Hussein | Head coach – Ostap Markevych; Assistant coach – Oleksandr Ivanov; Goalies coach – Ihor Shukhovtsev; Coach – Serhiy Atlasyuk; Physio coach – Serhiy Yankovyi; Analytics coach – (Belarus) Ilya Kononov | Head coach – Hennadiy Orbu; Assistant coach – Serhiy Hrybanov; Goalies coach – Volodymyr Makarenko |

== League and Cup history ==
=== Soviet Union ===
| Season | Div. | Pos. | Pl. | W | D | L | GS | GA | P | Domestic Cup | Europe | Notes |
|---|---|---|---|---|---|---|---|---|---|---|---|---|
Avanhard Zhdanov
| 1958 | Rep | 6/_{8} | 14 | 5 | 2 | 7 | 19 | 25 | 12 | | | |
| 1959 | Rep | 2/_{8} | 14 | 10 | 1 | 3 | 24 | 9 | 21 | | | admitted to Class B |
Azovstal Zhdanov
| 1960 | 2nd | 9 | 36 | 11 | 12 | 13 | 30 | 42 | 34 | | | Ukraine, Zone 2 |
| 1961 | 2nd | 11 | 36 | 11 | 12 | 13 | 36 | 37 | 34 | 1/64 finals | | Ukraine, Zone 2 |
| 1961 | 2nd | X | 2 | 0 | 2 | 0 | 0 | 0 | 2 | 1/64 finals | | Play-off |
| 1962 | 2nd | 5 | 24 | 11 | 5 | 8 | 39 | 40 | 27 | 1/128 finals | | Ukraine, Zone 3 |
| 1962 | 2nd | 6 | 10 | 3 | 5 | 2 | 14 | 13 | 11 | 1/128 finals | | Play-off |
| 1963 | 3rd | 2 | 38 | 19 | 11 | 8 | 54 | 37 | 49 | 1/1024 finals | | Ukraine, Zone 2 |
| 1963 | 3rd | X | 2 | 1 | 1 | 0 | 1 | 0 | 3 | 1/1024 finals | | Play-off |
| 1964 | 3rd | 15 | 30 | 5 | 12 | 13 | 19 | 33 | 22 | 1/256 finals | | Ukraine, Zone 3 |
| 1964 | 3rd | 4 | 8 | 1 | 2 | 5 | 7 | 15 | 4 | 1/256 finals | | Play-off |
| 1965 | idle | | | | | | | | | | | |
Azovets Zhdanov
| 1966 | 3rd | 16 | 38 | 11 | 9 | 18 | 43 | 63 | 31 | | | Ukraine, Zone 2 |
| 1966 | 3rd | X | 2 | 0 | 1 | 1 | 1 | 4 | 1 | | | Play-off |
| 1967 | 3rd | 12 | 40 | 16 | 7 | 17 | 50 | 42 | 39 | 1/2048 finals | | Ukraine, Zone 2 |
| 1968 | 2nd | 11 | 40 | 11 | 17 | 12 | 30 | 30 | 39 | | | Subgroup 1 |
| 1969 | 2nd | 16 | 42 | 12 | 12 | 18 | 40 | 52 | 36 | 1/128 finals | | Subgroup 3 |
| 1970 | 3rd | 6 | 42 | 15 | 18 | 9 | 44 | 34 | 48 | 1/64 finals | | Zone 1 |
Metallurg / Metalurh Zhdanov
| 1971 | 3rd | 11 | 50 | 18 | 15 | 17 | 62 | 55 | 51 | | | Zone 1 |
| 1972 | 3rd | 9 | 46 | 20 | 13 | 13 | 56 | 45 | 53 | | | Zone 1 |
| 1973 | 3rd | 23 | 44 | 10 | 4/4 | 26 | 41 | 84 | 24 | | | Zone 1 (Note: Note: In 1973, in case of a draw there would be a Penalty shootout. The team that won the shootout would earn a single (1) point, the losing team would receive no (0) points as in case of a regular loss. In case of Mariupol that placed last among 23 teams, it drew 8 games in four (4) of them it won shootouts, in other four (4) it lost shootouts.) |
In 1974 - 1989 idle
Novator Mariupol
| 1990 | 4th | 5 | 28 | 15 | 6 | 7 | 55 | 25 | 36 | | | |
| 1991 | 4th | 1 | 30 | 20 | 10 | 0 | 65 | 19 | 50 | | | |
| 1991 | 4th | 1 | 5 | 4 | 1 | 0 | 9 | 3 | 9 | | | |

=== Ukraine ===
| Season | Div. | Pos. | Pl. | W | D | L | GS | GA | P | Domestic Cup | Europe | | Notes |
|---|---|---|---|---|---|---|---|---|---|---|---|---|---|
Novator
| 1992 | 2nd "B" | 11 | 26 | 10 | 4 | 12 | 36 | 39 | 24 | 1/16 finals | | | Relegated |
Azovets
| 1992–93 | 3rd | 13 | 34 | 9 | 11 | 14 | 34 | 47 | 29 | 1/64 finals | | | |
| 1993–94 | 3rd | 12 | 42 | 16 | 7 | 19 | 43 | 58 | 39 | 1/32 finals | | | |
| 1994–95 | 3rd | 12 | 42 | 17 | 6 | 19 | 37 | 55 | 57 | 1/64 finals | | | |
| 1995–96 | 3rd "B" | 1 | 38 | 30 | 4 | 4 | 70 | 24 | 94 | 1/32 finals | | | Promoted |
Metalurh
| 1996–97 | 2nd | 3 | 46 | 29 | 6 | 11 | 92 | 56 | 93 | 1/16 finals | | | Promoted |
| 1997–98 | 1st | 12 | 30 | 8 | 9 | 13 | 27 | 48 | 33 | 1/8 finals | | | |
| 1998–99 | 1st | 5 | 30 | 14 | 6 | 10 | 35 | 27 | 48 | 1/8 finals | | | |
| 1999–00 | 1st | 8 | 30 | 13 | 3 | 14 | 49 | 45 | 42 | 1/16 finals | | | |
| 2000–01 | 1st | 4 | 26 | 13 | 4 | 9 | 35 | 26 | 43 | 1/2 finals | | | |
| 2001–02 | 1st | 10 | 26 | 6 | 8 | 12 | 29 | 42 | 26 | 1/8 finals | | | |
Illichivets
| 2002–03 | 1st | 10 | 30 | 8 | 10 | 12 | 34 | 38 | 34 | 1/32 finals | | | |
| 2003–04 | 1st | 8 | 30 | 10 | 10 | 10 | 34 | 36 | 40 | 1/4 finals | | | |
| 2004–05 | 1st | 5 | 30 | 12 | 8 | 10 | 38 | 34 | 44 | 1/8 finals | UC | 2nd qual round | |
| 2005–06 | 1st | 4 | 30 | 12 | 7 | 11 | 30 | 34 | 43 | 1/2 finals | | | |
| 2006–07 | 1st | 15 | 30 | 6 | 7 | 17 | 23 | 39 | 25 | 1/4 finals | | | Relegated |
| 2007–08 | 2nd | 1 | 38 | 26 | 7 | 5 | 65 | 26 | 85 | 1/4 finals | | | Promoted |
| 2008–09 | 1st | 14 | 30 | 7 | 5 | 18 | 31 | 54 | 26 | 1/16 finals | | | |
| 2009–10 | 1st | 12 | 30 | 7 | 8 | 15 | 31 | 56 | 29 | 1/8 finals | | | |
| 2010–11 | 1st | 14 | 30 | 7 | 8 | 15 | 45 | 67 | 29 | 1/16 finals | | | |
| 2011–12 | 1st | 11 | 30 | 8 | 8 | 14 | 28 | 42 | 32 | 1/16 finals | | | |
| 2012–13 | 1st | 9 | 30 | 10 | 8 | 12 | 30 | 31 | 38 | 1/8 finals | | | |
| 2013–14 | 1st | 10 | 28 | 10 | 4 | 14 | 27 | 33 | 34 | 1/16 finals | | | |
| 2014–15 | 1st | 14 | 26 | 3 | 5 | 18 | 25 | 55 | 14 | 1/8 finals | | | Relegated |
| 2015–16 | 2nd | 4 | 30 | 14 | 11 | 5 | 34 | 23 | 53 | 1/16 finals | | | |
| 2016–17 | 2nd | 1 | 34 | 25 | 6 | 3 | 61 | 21 | 81 | 1/4 finals | | | Promoted |
FC Mariupol
| 2017–18 | 1st | 5 | 32 | 10 | 9 | 13 | 38 | 41 | 39 | 1/2 finals | | | |
| 2018–19 | 1st | 4 | 32 | 12 | 7 | 13 | 36 | 47 | 43 | 1/8 finals | EL | 3rd qual round | |
| 2019–20 | 1st | 8 | 32 | 12 | 9 | 11 | 40 | 46 | 45 | 1/2 finals | EL | 3rd qual round | EL play-offs – Finalist |
| 2020–21 | 1st | 11 | 26 | 6 | 8 | 12 | 27 | 41 | 26 | | | | |
| 2021–22 | 1st | 16 | 18 | 2 | 2 | 14 | 21 | 44 | 8 | | | | Season canceled; membership suspended |

- 1 tier: 22 (Soviet Union 0 / Ukraine 22)
- 2 tier: 10 (Soviet Union 5 / Ukraine 5)
- 3 tier: 12 (Soviet Union 8 / Ukraine 4)
- 4 tier: 2 (Soviet Union 2 / Ukraine –)

== European record ==
Mariupol first qualified for European competitions in 2004 when they played in the UEFA Cup through the UEFA Respect Fair Play ranking award.

| Season | Competition | Round | Opponents | Home | Away | Aggregate |
|---|---|---|---|---|---|---|
| 2004–05 | UEFA Cup | 1Q | (Armenia) Banants | 2–0 | 2–0 | 4–0 |
| 2004–05 | UEFA Cup | 2Q | Austria Wien | 0–0 | 0–3 | 0–3 |
| 2018–19 | UEFA Europa League | 2Q | (Sweden) Djurgårdens IF | 2–1 (Note: The game was played in Odesa for security reasons due to the War in Donbas.) (a.e.t.) | 1–1 | 3–2 |
| 2018–19 | UEFA Europa League | 3Q | (France) Bordeaux | 1–3 | 1–2 | 2–5 |
| 2019–20 | UEFA Europa League | 3Q | (Netherlands) AZ | 0–0 | 0–4 | 0–4 |

== Managers ==
- (Ukraine) Mykola Pavlov (1 July 1997 – 12 Nov 2004)
- (Ukraine) Ivan Balan (13 Nov 2004 – 22 April 2007)
- (Ukraine) Semen Altman (1 July 2007 – 14 Dec 2007)
- (Ukraine) Oleksandr Ishchenko (2 Jan 2008 – 2 Sep 2008)
- (Ukraine) Illya Blyznyuk (2 Sep 2008 – 1 Nov 2010)
- (Ukraine) Oleksandr Volkov (interim) (1 Nov 2010 – 27 Nov 2010)
- (Ukraine) Valeriy Yaremchenko (27 Nov 2010 – 5 Oct 2011)
- (Ukraine) Ihor Leonov (interim) (6 Oct 2011 – 29 May 2012)
- (Ukraine) Mykola Pavlov (29 May 2012 – 30 May 2015)
- (Ukraine) Valeriy Kriventsov (22 June 2015 – 10 June 2016)
- (Ukraine) Oleksandr Sevidov (10 June 2016 – 22 Sep 2017)
- (Ukraine) Oleksandr Babych (22 Sep 2017 – 29 July 2020)
- (Ukraine) Ostap Markevych (3 Aug 2020 – 2022)

== See also ==
- FC Illichivets-2 Mariupol
- MBK Mariupol, basketball team of the former SC Novator
