= Ostap Markevych =

Ukrainian football coach (born 1978)

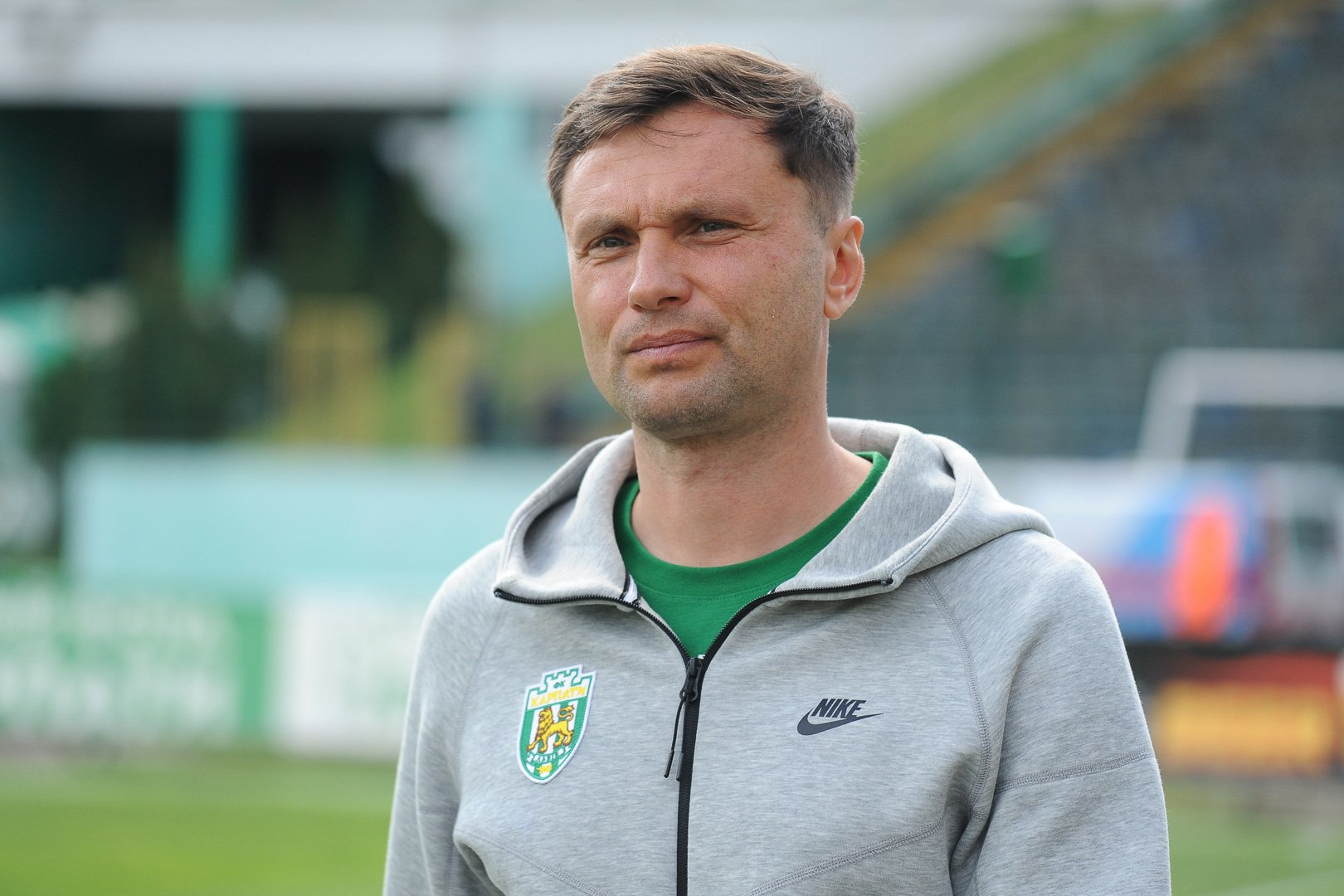
- Markevych in 2024

Personal information
- Full name: Ostap Myronovych Markevych
- Date of birth: 4 April 1978 (age 48)
- Place of birth: Lviv, Ukrainian SSR

Senior career*
Years	Team	Apps	(Gls)
1997–1998	Karpaty-2 Lviv	1	(0)

Managerial career
- 2016–2019: Villarreal (youth)
- 2019: Ahrobiznes Volochysk
- 2019–2020: Chornomorets Odesa
- 2020–2022: Mariupol
- 2022–2023: Radunia Stężyca
- * Club domestic league appearances and goals

Ostap Markevych (Ukrainian: Остап Миронович Маркевич; born 4 April 1978) is a Ukrainian professional football manager and former football and futsal player. He was most recently the assistant manager of Karpaty Lviv.

He is a son of a notable Ukrainian coach Myron Markevych.

== Career ==
He worked as a manager for Villarreal's youth teams. On 14 November 2022, he was announced as the new manager of Polish club Radunia Stężyca, replacing Sebastian Letniowski. On 13 May 2023, with Radunia just one spot and one point above the relegation zone with three matchdays to go, Markevych was relieved of his duties.
