= Vitaliy Starovyk =

Ukrainian footballer and manager

Personal information
- Full name: Vitaliy Viktorovych Starovyk
- Date of birth: 3 September 1978 (age 48)
- Place of birth: Lutuhyne, Ukrainian SSR, Soviet Union
- Position: Midfielder

Team information
- Current team: Chornomorets-2 Odesa (manager)

Youth career
- Zorya sports school

Senior career*
Years	Team	Apps	(Gls)
1995–1996	Zorya Luhansk	27	(0)
1997	Dynamo Kyiv	0	(0)
1997	→ Dynamo-3 Kyiv	15	(1)
1998	FC Cherkasy	7	(0)
1998	Polissya Zhytomyr	9	(0)
1999	Avanhard Rovenky	22	(4)
2000	Shakhtar Luhansk	9	(3)
2001	Karpaty Lviv	3	(0)
2001	→ Karpaty-2 Lviv	6	(0)
2001	→ Karpaty-3 Lviv	1	(0)
2002	Happy End Camenca	13	(4)
2002–2004	Nistru Otaci	38	(3)
2005	Dynamo Makhachkala	14	(4)
2005	Torpedo Zhodino	5	(0)
2006	Mashuk-KMV Pyatigorsk	15	(0)
2007	Iskra-Stal Rîbnița	9	(1)
2007–2008	Krymteplytsia Molodizhne	36	(7)
2008–2009	Dnister Ovidiopol	29	(1)
2009–2011	Krymteplytsia Molodizhne	31	(0)
2012–2013	Real Pharma Yuzhne	30	(10)
Total		319	(38)

Managerial career
- 2014–2016: Chornomorets sports school
- 2018–2019: Chornomorets Odesa (assistant)
- 2019: Chornomorets Odesa (caretaker)
- 2019–: Chornomorets-2 Odesa
- * Club domestic league appearances and goals

Vitaliy Starovyk (Ukrainian: Віталій Вікторович Старовик; born 3 September 1978) is a Ukrainian football coach and former player who is currently manager of Chornomorets-2 Odesa.

After Angel Chervenkov left Odesa club, Starovyk was appointed as an acting coach.
