= 2011–12 FC Desna Chernihiv season =

FC Desna Chernihiv
2011–12 season
- President: Yuriy Tymoshok & Oleksiy Chebotaryov
- Manager: Oleksandr Deriberin
- Stadium: Chernihiv Stadium
- Ukrainian Second League: 2nd
- Ukrainian Cup: Round of 32 (1/16)
- Top goalscorer: League: Roman Poltavets (8); All: Roman Poltavets (8)
Home colours	Away colours

For the 2011–12 season, FC Desna Chernihiv competed in the Ukrainian Second League.

== Players ==
=== Squad information ===
As of 31 May 2019

Squad no.	Name	Nationality	Position	Date of birth (age)
Goalkeepers
28	Maksym Tatarenko ^{List B}	(Ukraine)	GK	7 March 1999 (aged 20)
	Kostyantyn Makhnovskyi	(Ukraine)	GK	1 January 1989 (aged 30)
	Oleh Shevchenko	(Ukraine)	GK	5 June 1988 (aged 30)
Defenders
3	Temur Partsvania	(Ukraine) (Georgia (country))	DF	6 July 1991 (aged 27)
17	Andriy Hitchenko	(Ukraine)	DF	2 October 1984 (aged 34)
21	Serhiy Lyulka	(Ukraine)	DF	22 February 1990 (aged 29)
23	Dmytro Nyemchaninov	(Ukraine)	DF	27 January 1990 (aged 29)
32	Maksym Imerekov	(Ukraine)	DF	23 January 1991 (aged 28)
33	Andriy Slinkin	(Ukraine)	DF	19 February 1991 (aged 28)
45	Denys Favorov (Captain)	(Ukraine)	DF	1 April 1991 (aged 28)
Midfielders
7	Vladyslav Ohirya	(Ukraine)	MF	3 April 1990 (aged 29)
12	Yehor Kartushov	(Ukraine)	MF	5 January 1991 (aged 28)
14	Andriy Yakymiv ^{List B}	(Ukraine)	MF	15 June 1997 (aged 21)
15	Renat Mochulyak ^{List B}	(Ukraine)	MF	15 February 1998 (aged 21)
16	Yevheniy Belych ^{List B}	(Ukraine)	MF	9 January 2001 (aged 18)
18	Mykhaylo Kozak	(Ukraine)	MF	20 January 1991 (aged 28)
19	Artem Favorov	(Ukraine)	MF	19 March 1994 (aged 25)
22	Andriy Mostovyi	(Ukraine)	MF	24 January 1988 (aged 31)
27	Serhiy Starenkyi	(Ukraine)	MF	20 September 1984 (aged 34)
79	Mykhaylo Serhiychuk	(Ukraine)	MF	29 July 1991 (aged 27)
89	Oleksandr Volkov	(Ukraine)	MF	7 February 1989 (aged 30)
90	Andriy Bohdanov	(Ukraine)	MF	21 January 1990 (aged 29)
Forwards
9	Dmytro Khlyobas	(Ukraine)	FW	9 May 1994 (aged 25)
10	Oleksandr Filippov	(Ukraine)	FW	23 October 1992 (aged 26)
20	Denys Bezborodko (on loan from Shakhtar Donetsk)	(Ukraine)	FW	31 May 1994 (aged 25)

== Transfers ==
=== In ===
Date	Pos.	Player	Age	Moving from	Type	Fee	Source
Summer
15 July 2011	GK	(Ukraine) Artem Beloshapka	38	(Ukraine) Lviv	Transfer	Free	
15 July 2011	FW	(Ukraine) Ruslan Chernenko	38	(Ukraine) Arsenal Kyiv	On Loan	Free	
22 July 2011	MF	(Ukraine) Mykyta Havrylenko	24	(Moldova) Iskra-Stal	Transfer	Free	
22 July 2011	FW	(Ukraine) Yuriy Malyey	24	(Ukraine) YSB Chernihiv	Transfer	Free	
Winter
22 January 2012	GK	(Ukraine) Andriy Rad	24	(Ukraine) Arsenal Bila Tserkva	Transfer	Free	
22 January 2012	FW	(Ukraine) Serhiy Hrybanov	24	(Ukraine) Sevastopol	Transfer	Free	
22 January 2012	FW	(Ukraine) Yevhen Chepurnenko	24	(Ukraine) Oleksandriya	Transfer	Free	
22 January 2012	FW	(Ukraine) Yuriy Furta	24	(Ukraine) Enerhetyk Burshtyn	Transfer	Free	

=== Out ===
Date	Pos.	Player	Age	Moving to	Type	Fee	Source
Summer
15 July 2011	DF	(Ukraine) Andriy Polyanytsya	20	(Ukraine) Shakhtar Sverdlovsk	Transfer	Free	
15 July 2011	FW	(Ukraine) Oleh Orekhov	24	(Ukraine) Olimpik Donetsk	Transfer	Free	
Winter
22 January 2012	MF	(Ukraine) Mykyta Gavrylenko	24	(Moldova) Iskra-Stal	Transfer	Free	
22 January 2012	FW	(Ukraine) Yuriy Malyey	24	(Ukraine) YSB Chernihiv	Transfer	Free	

== Statistics ==
=== Appearances and goals ===
No.	Pos	Nat	Player	Total		Premier League		Cup	
No.	Pos	Nat	Player	Apps	Goals	Apps	Goals	Apps	Goals
Goalkeepers
	GK	(Ukraine) UKR	Yevhen Shyryayev	18	0	18	0	0	0
	GK	(Ukraine) UKR	Artem Beloshapka	8	0	8	0	0	0
Defenders
	DF	(Ukraine) UKR	Oleh Orekhov	2	0	2	0	0	0
	DF	(Ukraine) UKR	Volodymyr Chulanov	15	0	15	0	0	0
	DF	(Ukraine) UKR	Denys Anelikov	16	0	16	0	0	0
	DF	(Ukraine) UKR	Serhiy Ilin	2	0	2	0	0	0
	DF	(Ukraine) UKR	Yarema Kavatsiv	4	1	4	1	0	0
	DF	(Ukraine) UKR	Vadym Hetman	7	0	7	0	0	0
Midfielders
	MF	(Ukraine) UKR	Roman Lutsenko	3	0	3	0	0	0
	MF	(Ukraine) UKR	Denys Skepskyi	7	3	7	3	0	0
	MF	(Ukraine) UKR	Oleksiy Pavelko	21	4	21	4	0	0
	MF	(Ukraine) UKR	Vadym Bovtruk	8	1	8	1	0	0
	MF	(Ukraine) UKR	Valeriy Radchenko	11	1	11	1	0	0
	MF	(Ukraine) UKR	Vadym Zhuk	5	0	5	0	0	0
	MF	(Ukraine) UKR	Mykyta Gavrylenko	10	0	10	0	0	0
	MF	(Ukraine) UKR	Serhiy Hrybanov	9	3	9	3	0	0
	MF	(Ukraine) UKR	Maksym Havrylenko	9	1	9	1	0	0
	MF	(Ukraine) UKR	Oleksandr Bryl	21	0	21	0	0	0
	MF	(Ukraine) UKR	Yaroslav Serdyuk	11	0	11	0	0	0
Forwards
	FW	(Ukraine) UKR	Oleksandr Hrebieniuk	4	0	4	0	0	0
	FW	(Ukraine) UKR	Andriy Kruhlyak	13	3	13	3	0	0
	FW	(Ukraine) UKR	Yevhen Chepurnenko	8	4	8	4	0	0
	FW	(Ukraine) UKR	Petro Kondratyuk	24	4	24	4	0	0
	FW	(Ukraine) UKR	Yuriy Furta	3	0	3	0	0	0
	FW	(Ukraine) UKR	Roman Poltavets	18	8	18	8	0	0
	FW	(Ukraine) UKR	Yuriy Malyey	1	0	1	0	0	0
	FW	(Ukraine) UKR	Oleksandr Kozhemyachenko	9	2	9	2	0	0

Source: Competitions

Last updated: 31 May 2019

=== Goalscorers ===
Rank	No.	Pos	Nat	Name	Premier League	Cup	Europa League	Total
1		FW	(Ukraine)	Roman Poltavets	8	0	0	8
2		MF	(Ukraine)	Oleksiy Pavelko	4	0	0	4
2		FW	(Ukraine)	Yevhen Chepurnenko	4	0	0	4
2		FW	(Ukraine)	Petro Kondratyuk	4	0	0	4
3		MF	(Ukraine)	Denys Skepskyi	3	0	0	3
3		MF	(Ukraine)	Serhiy Hrybanov	3	0	0	3
3		FW	(Ukraine)	Andriy Kruhlyak	3	0	0	3
4		FW	(Ukraine)	Oleksandr Kozhemyachenko	3	0	0	3
5		DF	(Ukraine)	Yarema Kavatsiv	1	0	0	1
5		MF	(Ukraine)	Vadym Bovtruk	1	0	0	1
5		MF	(Ukraine)	Maksym Havrylenko	3	0	0	3
				Total	34	0	0	34

Last updated: 31 May 2019
