= 2010–11 FC Desna Chernihiv season =

FC Desna Chernihiv
2010–11 season
- President: Yuriy Tymoshok & Oleksiy Chebotaryov
- Manager: Viktor Dohadailo, Vitaly Levchenko, Anatoly Byelay, Oleksiy Skala, Oleh Melnychenko, Ihor Khimich
- Stadium: Chernihiv Stadium
- Ukrainian Second League: 5th
- Ukrainian Cup: First Preliminary Round (1/64 finals)
- Top goalscorer: League: Oleksandr Kozhemyachenko (12); All: Oleksandr Kozhemyachenko (12)
Home colours	Away colours

For the 2010–11 season, FC Desna Chernihiv competed in the Ukrainian Second League.

== Players ==
=== Squad information ===
As of 31 May 2019

Squad no.	Name	Nationality	Position	Date of birth (age)
Goalkeepers
28	Maksym Tatarenko ^{List B}	(Ukraine)	GK	7 March 1999 (aged 20)
	Kostyantyn Makhnovskyi	(Ukraine)	GK	1 January 1989 (aged 30)
	Oleh Shevchenko	(Ukraine)	GK	5 June 1988 (aged 30)
Defenders
3	Temur Partsvania	(Ukraine) (Georgia (country))	DF	6 July 1991 (aged 27)
17	Andriy Hitchenko	(Ukraine)	DF	2 October 1984 (aged 34)
21	Serhiy Lyulka	(Ukraine)	DF	22 February 1990 (aged 29)
23	Dmytro Nyemchaninov	(Ukraine)	DF	27 January 1990 (aged 29)
32	Maksym Imerekov	(Ukraine)	DF	23 January 1991 (aged 28)
33	Andriy Slinkin	(Ukraine)	DF	19 February 1991 (aged 28)
45	Denys Favorov (Captain)	(Ukraine)	DF	1 April 1991 (aged 28)
Midfielders
7	Vladyslav Ohirya	(Ukraine)	MF	3 April 1990 (aged 29)
12	Yehor Kartushov	(Ukraine)	MF	5 January 1991 (aged 28)
14	Andriy Yakymiv ^{List B}	(Ukraine)	MF	15 June 1997 (aged 21)
15	Renat Mochulyak ^{List B}	(Ukraine)	MF	15 February 1998 (aged 21)
16	Yevheniy Belych ^{List B}	(Ukraine)	MF	9 January 2001 (aged 18)
18	Mykhaylo Kozak	(Ukraine)	MF	20 January 1991 (aged 28)
19	Artem Favorov	(Ukraine)	MF	19 March 1994 (aged 25)
22	Andriy Mostovyi	(Ukraine)	MF	24 January 1988 (aged 31)
27	Serhiy Starenkyi	(Ukraine)	MF	20 September 1984 (aged 34)
79	Mykhaylo Serhiychuk	(Ukraine)	MF	29 July 1991 (aged 27)
89	Oleksandr Volkov	(Ukraine)	MF	7 February 1989 (aged 30)
90	Andriy Bohdanov	(Ukraine)	MF	21 January 1990 (aged 29)
Forwards
9	Dmytro Khlyobas	(Ukraine)	FW	9 May 1994 (aged 25)
10	Oleksandr Filippov	(Ukraine)	FW	23 October 1992 (aged 26)
20	Denys Bezborodko (on loan from Shakhtar Donetsk)	(Ukraine)	FW	31 May 1994 (aged 25)

== Transfers ==
=== In ===
Date	Pos.	Player	Age	Moving from	Type	Fee	Source
Summer
15 July 2010	GK	(Ukraine) Viktor Litvin	20	(Ukraine) Desna-2 Chernihiv	Loan Return	Free	
15 July 2010	FW	(Ukraine) Andrey Kandaurov	38	(Ukraine) Lviv	Transfer	Free	
15 July 2010	FW	(Ukraine) Ruslan Chernenko	38	(Ukraine) Arsenal Kyiv	On Loan	Free	
Winter
15 January 2011	MF	(Ukraine) Yaroslav Serdyuk	38	(Ukraine) FC Sevastopol	Transfer	Free	
15 January 2011	DF	(Ukraine) Denys Anelikov	20	(Ukraine) Lviv	Transfer	Free	
15 January 2011	DF	(Ukraine) Andrey Polyanitsa	20	(Ukraine) Vorskla Poltava	Transfer	Free	

=== Out ===
Date	Pos.	Player	Age	Moving to	Type	Fee	Source
Summer
15 July 2010	GK	(Ukraine) Artem Padun	38	(Ukraine) Avangard Korukivka	Transfer	Free	
15 July 2010	GK	(Ukraine) Anatoliy Pylypenko	38	(Ukraine) Stal Alchevsk	Transfer	Free	
15 July 2010	GK	(Ukraine) Sergiy Yakovets	38	End of Career	Transfer	Free	
20 July 2010	FW	(Ukraine) Oleh Orekhov	24	(Ukraine) Olimpik Donetsk	Transfer	Free	
20 July 2010	MF	(Ukraine) Serhiy Hrybanov	24	(Ukraine) Oleksandriya	Transfer	Free	
20 July 2010	MF	(Ukraine) Oleksandr Babor	20	(Ukraine) Yednist-2 Plysky	Transfer	Free	
15 July 2010	MF	(Ukraine) Andriy Hitchenko	38	(Ukraine) Oleksandriya	Transfer	Free	
15 July 2010	MF	(Ukraine) Serhiy Starenkyi	38	(Ukraine) Lviv	Transfer	Free	
15 July 2010	MF	(Ukraine) Dmytro Evstafiev	38	(Ukraine) Helios Kharkiv	Transfer	Free	
15 July 2010	FW	(Ukraine) Andriy Ilyashov	38	(Ukraine) Avanhard Kramatorsk	Transfer	Free	
15 July 2010	MF	(Ukraine) Oleksiy Pospelov	38	(Ukraine) Obolon Kyiv	Transfer	Free	
15 July 2010	DF	(Ukraine) Denys Anelikov	20	(Ukraine) Lviv	Transfer	Free	

== Statistics ==
=== Appearances and goals ===
No.	Pos	Nat	Player	Total		Premier League		Cup	
No.	Pos	Nat	Player	Apps	Goals	Apps	Goals	Apps	Goals
Goalkeepers
	GK	(Ukraine) UKR	Maksym Kuchynskyi	7	0	7	0	0	0
	GK	(Ukraine) UKR	Ihor Vitiv	11	0	11	0	0	0
	GK	(Ukraine) UKR	Viktor Litvin	7	0	7	0	0	0
Defenders
	DF	(Ukraine) UKR	Yarema Kavatsiv	11	1	11	1	0	0
	DF	(Ukraine) UKR	Oleh Orekhov	8	0	8	0	0	0
	DF	(Ukraine) UKR	Vadym Hetman	15	0	15	0	0	0
	DF	(Ukraine) UKR	Denys Anelikov	5	0	5	0	0	0
	DF	(Ukraine) UKR	Serhiy Ilin	6	0	6	0	0	0
	DF	(Ukraine) UKR	Andrey Polyanitsa	7	0	7	0	0	0
Midfielders
	MF	(Ukraine) UKR	Yevhen Zarichnyuk	5	1	5	1	0	0
	MF	(Ukraine) UKR	Kyrylo Silich	0	0	0	0	0	0
	MF	(Ukraine) UKR	Oleksandr Oliynyk	19	3	19	3	0	0
	MF	(Ukraine) UKR	Oleksandr Bryl	4	1	4	1	0	0
	MF	(Ukraine) UKR	Oleksiy Pavelko	6	0	6	0	0	0
	MF	(Ukraine) UKR	Yaroslav Serdyuk	5	0	5	0	0	0
Forwards
	FW	(Ukraine) UKR	Oleksandr Kozhemyachenko	19	12	19	12	0	0
	FW	(Ukraine) UKR	Denis Shevchuk	7	1	7	1	0	0
	FW	(Georgia (country)) GEO	Levan Gulordava	13	4	13	4	0	0
	FW	(Ukraine) UKR	Sergey Alayev	17	4	17	4	0	0

Source: Competitions

Last updated: 31 May 2019

=== Goalscorers ===
Rank	No.	Pos	Nat	Name	Premier League	Cup	Europa League	Total
1		FW	(Ukraine)	Oleksandr Kozhemyachenko	12	0	0	12
2		FW	(Georgia (country))	Levan Gulordava	4	0	0	4
2		FW	(Ukraine)	Sergey Alayev	4	0	0	4
3		MF	(Ukraine)	Oleksandr Oliynyk	3	0	0	3
5		DF	(Ukraine)	Yarema Kavatsiv	1	0	0	1
5		MF	(Ukraine)	Yevhen Zarichnyuk	1	0	0	1
5		MF	(Ukraine)	Oleksandr Bryl	1	0	0	1
5		FW	(Ukraine)	Denis Shevchuk	1	0	0	1
				Total	27	0	0	27

Last updated: 31 May 2019
