= 2009–10 FC Desna Chernihiv season =

FC Desna Chernihiv
2009–10 season
- President: Oleksandr Povorozniuk
- Manager: Oleksandr Ryabokon
- Stadium: Chernihiv Stadium
- Ukrainian First League: 8th
- Ukrainian Cup: Round of 64 (1/32)
- Top goalscorer: League: Serhiy Hrybanov (14); All: Serhiy Hrybanov (14)
Home colours	Away colours

For the 2009–10 season, FC Desna Chernihiv competed in the Ukrainian First League.

== Transfers ==
=== In ===
Date	Pos.	Player	Age	Moving from	Type	Fee	Source
Summer
15 July 2009	GK	(Ukraine) Artem Padun	38	(Ukraine) Polissie Dobrianka	Transfer	Free	
15 July 2009	DF	(Ukraine) Oleksandr Bogach	38	(Ukraine) Krymteplytsia Molodizhne	Transfer	Free	
15 July 2009	MF	(Ukraine) Oleksandr Babor	20	(Ukraine) Yednist-2 Plysky	Transfer	Free	
15 July 2009	FW	(Ukraine) Andriy Ilyashov	38	(Ukraine) Ihroservice Simferopol	Transfer	Free	
15 July 2009	FW	(Ukraine) Andrey Kandaurov	38	(Ukraine) Obolon-2 Kyiv	Transfer	Free	
15 July 2009	FW	(Ukraine) Yevhen Yeliseyev	38	(Ukraine) Dnipro Cherkasy	Transfer	Free	
15 July 2009	DF	(Ukraine) Andriy Hitchenko	38	(Ukraine) Oleksandriya	Transfer	Free	
20 July 2009	FW	(Ukraine) Tymur Rustamov	24	(Ukraine) Desna-2 Chernihiv	Transfer	Free	
20 July 2009	FW	(Ukraine) Ruslan Ermolenkov	24	(Ukraine) Feniks-Illichovets Kalinine	Transfer	Free	
20 July 2009	DF	(Ukraine) Oleh Orekhov	24	(Ukraine) Ros Bila Tserkva	Transfer	Free	
20 July 2009	MF	(Ukraine) Roman Voynarovskyi	24	(Ukraine) FC Krymteplytsia Molodizhne	Transfer	Free	
15 July 2009	DF	(Ukraine) Maksym Stoyan	38	(Ukraine) MFC Mykolaiv	Transfer	Free	
15 July 2009	MF	(Ukraine) Oleksiy Pospelov	38	(Ukraine) Knyazha-2 Shchaslyve	Transfer	Free	
15 June 2009	DF	(Ukraine) Denys Anelikov	20	(Belarus) Shakhtyor Soligorsk	Transfer	Free	
Winter
22 January 2010	DF	(Ukraine) Volodymyr Chulanov	24	(Ukraine) Sevastopol	Transfer	Free	
22 January 2010	MF	(Ukraine) Dmytro Evstafiev	38	(Ukraine) Helios Kharkiv	Transfer	Free	
22 January 2010	MF	(Ukraine) Ruslan Yermolenko	38	(Ukraine) Feniks-Illichovets Kalinine	Transfer	Free	

=== Out ===
Date	Pos.	Player	Age	Moving to	Type	Fee	Source
Summer
20 July 2009	GK	(Ukraine) Yuriy Nikitenko	38	Unattached	Transfer	Free	
22 January 2009	DF	(Ukraine) Yuriy Maksimenko	24	Unattached	Transfer	Free	
20 July 2009	MF	(Ukraine) Dmytro Evstafiev	38	(Ukraine) Helios Kharkiv	Transfer	Free	
20 July 2009	FW	(Ukraine) Volodymyr Kilikevych	24	(Moldova) FC Iskra-Stal Rîbniţa	Transfer	Free	
22 July 2009	FW	(Ukraine) Vyacheslav Sharpar	24	(Ukraine) Volyn Lutsk	Transfer	Free	
22 July 2009	FW	(Ukraine) Pavlo Shchedrakov	24	(Ukraine) Krymteplytsia Molodizhne	Transfer	Free	
22 July 2009	FW	(Ukraine) Ruslan Zeynalov	24	(Ukraine) Oleksandriya	Transfer	Free	
Winter
22 January 2010	DF	(Ukraine) Oleksandr Bogach	38	(Ukraine) foros yalta FC	Transfer	Free	
22 January 2010	FW	(Ukraine) Artem Mostovyi	24	Unattached	Transfer	Free	

== Statistics ==
=== Appearances and goals ===
No.	Pos	Nat	Player	Total		Premier League		Cup	
No.	Pos	Nat	Player	Apps	Goals	Apps	Goals	Apps	Goals
Goalkeepers
	GK	(Ukraine) UKR	Maksym Kuchynskyi	7	0	7	0	0	0
	GK	(Ukraine) UKR	Artem Padun	0	0	0	0	0	0
	GK	(Ukraine) UKR	Artem Koleda	10	0	10	0	0	0
	GK	(Ukraine) UKR	Sergiy Yakovets	6	0	6	0	0	0
	GK	(Ukraine) UKR	Anatoliy Pylypenko	26	0	26	0	0	0
Defenders
	DF	(Ukraine) UKR	Oleksandr Bogach	11	1	11	1	0	0
	DF	(Ukraine) UKR	Yevhen Yeliseyev	25	0	25	0	0	0
	DF	(Ukraine) UKR	Andriy Hitchenko	6	0	6	0	0	0
	DF	(Ukraine) UKR	Volodymyr Chulanov	8	0	8	0	0	0
	DF	(Ukraine) UKR	Tymur Rustamov	4	0	4	0	0	0
	DF	(Ukraine) UKR	Maksym Stoyan	28	0	28	0	0	0
	DF	(Ukraine) UKR	Denys Anelikov	29	1	29	1	0	0
	DF	(Ukraine) UKR	Oleh Orekhov	9	0	9	0	0	0
Midfielders
	MF	(Ukraine) UKR	Oleksiy Pospelov	23	1	23	1	0	0
	MF	(Ukraine) UKR	Serhiy Starenkyi	32	6	32	6	0	0
	MF	(Ukraine) UKR	Dmytro Evstafiev	15	0	15	0	0	0
	MF	(Ukraine) UKR	Serhiy Hrybanov	29	14	29	14	0	0
	MF	(Ukraine) UKR	Roman Voynarovskyi	14	2	14	2	0	0
	MF	(Ukraine) UKR	Andrey Kandaurov	25	2	25	2	0	0
	MF	(Ukraine) UKR	Oleksandr Babor	1	0	1	0	0	0
Forwards
	FW	(Ukraine) UKR	Petro Kondratyuk	31	2	31	2	0	0
	FW	(Ukraine) UKR	Andriy Ilyashov	17	1	17	1	0	0
	FW	(Ukraine) UKR	Ruslan Yermolenko	16	4	16	4	0	0
	FW	(Ukraine) UKR	Oleksandr Kozhemyachenko	16	0	16	0	0	0
	FW	(Ukraine) UKR	Artem Mostovyi	14	4	14	4	0	0

Source: Competitions

Last updated: 31 May 2019

=== Goalscorers ===
Rank	No.	Pos	Nat	Name	Premier League	Cup	Europa League	Total
1		MF	(Ukraine)	Serhiy Hrybanov	14	0	0	14
2		FW	(Ukraine)	Serhiy Starenkyi	6	0	0	6
3		FW	(Ukraine)	Ruslan Yermolenko	4	0	0	4
3		FW	(Ukraine)	Artem Mostovyi	4	0	0	4
4		MF	(Ukraine)	Roman Voynarovskyi	2	0	0	2
4		MF	(Ukraine)	Andrey Kandaurov	2	0	0	2
4		FW	(Ukraine)	Petro Kondratyuk	2	0	0	2
5		DF	(Ukraine)	Oleksandr Bogach	1	0	0	1
5		DF	(Ukraine)	Denys Anelikov	1	0	0	1
5		MF	(Ukraine)	Oleksiy Pospelov	1	0	0	1
5		FW	(Ukraine)	Andriy Ilyashov	1	0	0	1
				Total	38	0	0	38

Last updated: 31 May 2019
