= 2012–13 FC Desna Chernihiv season =

FC Desna Chernihiv
2012–13 season
- President: Oleksiy Chebotaryov
- Manager: Oleksandr Ryabokon
- Stadium: Chernihiv Stadium
- Ukrainian Second League: 1st
- Ukrainian Cup: Round of 32 (1/16)
- Top goalscorer: League: Petro Kondratyuk (11); All: Petro Kondratyuk (11)
Home colours	Away colours

For the 2012–13 season, the club competed in the Ukrainian Second League.

== Squad information ==
As of 31 May 2019

Squad no.	Name	Nationality	Position	Date of birth (age)
Goalkeepers
28	Maksym Tatarenko ^{List B}	(Ukraine)	GK	7 March 1999 (aged 20)
	Kostyantyn Makhnovskyi	(Ukraine)	GK	1 January 1989 (aged 30)
	Oleh Shevchenko	(Ukraine)	GK	5 June 1988 (aged 30)
Defenders
3	Temur Partsvania	(Ukraine) (Georgia (country))	DF	6 July 1991 (aged 27)
17	Andriy Hitchenko	(Ukraine)	DF	2 October 1984 (aged 34)
21	Serhiy Lyulka	(Ukraine)	DF	22 February 1990 (aged 29)
23	Dmytro Nyemchaninov	(Ukraine)	DF	27 January 1990 (aged 29)
32	Maksym Imerekov	(Ukraine)	DF	23 January 1991 (aged 28)
33	Andriy Slinkin	(Ukraine)	DF	19 February 1991 (aged 28)
45	Denys Favorov (Captain)	(Ukraine)	DF	1 April 1991 (aged 28)
Midfielders
7	Vladyslav Ohirya	(Ukraine)	MF	3 April 1990 (aged 29)
12	Yehor Kartushov	(Ukraine)	MF	5 January 1991 (aged 28)
14	Andriy Yakymiv ^{List B}	(Ukraine)	MF	15 June 1997 (aged 21)
15	Renat Mochulyak ^{List B}	(Ukraine)	MF	15 February 1998 (aged 21)
16	Yevheniy Belych ^{List B}	(Ukraine)	MF	9 January 2001 (aged 18)
18	Mykhaylo Kozak	(Ukraine)	MF	20 January 1991 (aged 28)
19	Artem Favorov	(Ukraine)	MF	19 March 1994 (aged 25)
22	Andriy Mostovyi	(Ukraine)	MF	24 January 1988 (aged 31)
27	Serhiy Starenkyi	(Ukraine)	MF	20 September 1984 (aged 34)
79	Mykhaylo Serhiychuk	(Ukraine)	MF	29 July 1991 (aged 27)
89	Oleksandr Volkov	(Ukraine)	MF	7 February 1989 (aged 30)
90	Andriy Bohdanov	(Ukraine)	MF	21 January 1990 (aged 29)
Forwards
9	Dmytro Khlyobas	(Ukraine)	FW	9 May 1994 (aged 25)
10	Oleksandr Filippov	(Ukraine)	FW	23 October 1992 (aged 26)
20	Denys Bezborodko (on loan from Shakhtar Donetsk)	(Ukraine)	FW	31 May 1994 (aged 25)

== Transfers ==
=== In ===
Date	Pos.	Player	Age	Moving from	Type	Fee	Source
Summer
15 July 2012	FW	(Ukraine) Ruslan Chernenko	38	(Ukraine) Arsenal Kyiv	On Loan	Free	
15 July 2012	DF	(Ukraine) Ilya Seryi	25	(Ukraine) Stroitel Pripyat	Transfer	Free	
Winter
22 January 2013	GK	(Ukraine) Andriy Rad	24	(Ukraine) Arsenal Bila Tserkva	Transfer	Free	

=== Out ===
Date	Pos.	Player	Age	Moving to	Type	Fee	Source
Summer
20 June 2012	MF	(Ukraine) Yaroslav Serdyuk	24	(Ukraine) FC Yednist' Plysky	Transfer	Free	
20 June 2012	FW	(Ukraine) Oleh Orekhov	24	(Ukraine) Olimpik Donetsk	Transfer	Free	
20 June 2012	FW	(Ukraine) Oleksandr Kozhemyachenko	24	(Ukraine) Avangard Korukivka	Transfer	Free	
20 July 2012	MF	(Ukraine) Yuriy Malyey	24	(Ukraine) YSB Chernigiv	Transfer	Free	

== Statistics ==
=== Appearances and goals ===
No.	Pos	Nat	Player	Total		Premier League		Cup	
No.	Pos	Nat	Player	Apps	Goals	Apps	Goals	Apps	Goals
Goalkeepers
	GK	(Ukraine) UKR	Andriy Rad	2	0	2	0	0	0
	GK	(Ukraine) UKR	Andriy Fedorenko	8	0	8	0	0	0
	GK	(Ukraine) UKR	Artem Beloshapka	2	0	2	0	0	0
Defenders
	DF	(Ukraine) UKR	Volodymyr Chulanov	24	0	24	0	0	0
	DF	(Ukraine) UKR	Oleh Orekhov	8	0	8	0	0	0
	DF	(Ukraine) UKR	Denys Anelikov	19	0	19	0	0	0
	DF	(Ukraine) UKR	Yarema Kavatsiv	27	1	27	1	0	0
	DF	(Ukraine) UKR	Ivan Bilyi	11	0	11	0	0	0
	DF	(Ukraine) UKR	Vadym Melnyk	31	3	31	3	0	0
	DF	(Ukraine) UKR	Ilya Seryi	2	0	2	0	0	0
Midfielders
	MF	(Ukraine) UKR	Vadym Zhuk	25	0	25	0	0	0
	MF	(Ukraine) UKR	Oleksandr Bryl	5	1	5	1	0	0
	MF	(Ukraine) UKR	Roman Lutsenko	17	1	17	1	0	0
	MF	(Ukraine) UKR	Roman Machulenko	10	1	10	1	0	0
	MF	(Ukraine) UKR	Oleh Polischuk	4	0	4	0	0	0
	MF	(Ukraine) UKR	Vadym Bovtruk	30	4	30	4	0	0
	MF	(Ukraine) UKR	Ruslan Chernenko	19	3	19	3	0	0
	DF	(Ukraine) UKR	Oleksandr Stetsenko	23	0	23	0	0	0
Forwards
	FW	(Ukraine) UKR	Petro Kondratyuk	31	11	31	11	0	0
	FW	(Ukraine) UKR	Yevhen Chepurnenko	30	7	30	7	0	0
	FW	(Ukraine) UKR	Yehor Kartushov	16	0	16	0	0	0
	FW	(Ukraine) UKR	Yuriy Pleshakov	9	3	9	3	0	0
	FW	(Ukraine) UKR	Dmytro Brovkin	19	2	19	2	0	0
	FW	(Ukraine) UKR	Yuriy Furta	24	8	24	8	0	0

Source: Competitions

Last updated: 31 May 2019

=== Goalscorers ===
Rank	No.	Pos	Nat	Name	Premier League	Cup	Europa League	Total
1		FW	(Ukraine)	Petro Kondratyuk	11	0	0	11
2		FW	(Ukraine)	Yuriy Furta	8	0	0	8
3		FW	(Ukraine)	Yevhen Chepurnenko	7	0	0	7
4		MF	(Ukraine)	Vadym Bovtruk	4	0	0	4
5		DF	(Ukraine)	Vadym Melnyk	3	0	0	3
5		MF	(Ukraine)	Ruslan Chernenko	3	0	0	3
5		FW	(Ukraine)	Yuriy Pleshakov	3	0	0	3
6		FW	(Ukraine)	Dmytro Brovkin	2	0	0	2
7		DF	(Ukraine)	Yarema Kavatsiv	1	0	0	1
7		MF	(Ukraine)	Oleksandr Bryl	1	0	0	1
7		MF	(Ukraine)	Roman Lutsenko	1	0	0	1
7		MF	(Ukraine)	Roman Machulenko	1	0	0	1
				Total	45	0	0	45

Last updated: 31 May 2019
