= 2009–10 Ukrainian Premier League youth championship =

Ukrainian Premier League youth championship
- Season: 2009–10

The 2009–10 Ukrainian Premier League youth championship season was a competition between the U-21 youth teams of Ukrainian Premier League clubs. The events in the senior leagues during the 2008–09 season saw FC Lviv Reserves and FC Kharkiv Reserves all relegated and replaced by the promoted teams Zakarpattia Reserves and Obolon Kyiv Reserves.

== Final standings ==
Pos	Team	Pld	W	D	L	GF	GA	GD	Pts
1	Karpaty Lviv reserves (C)	30	23	3	4	73	27	+46	72
2	Shakhtar Donetsk reserves	30	18	7	5	74	34	+40	61
3	Dynamo Kyiv reserves	30	19	4	7	65	37	+28	61
4	Chornomorets Odesa reserves (R)	30	18	5	7	67	45	+22	59
5	Metalist Kharkiv reserves	30	16	6	8	53	41	+12	54
6	Zorya Luhansk reserves	30	16	3	11	41	34	+7	51
7	Obolon Kyiv reserves	30	13	4	13	39	41	−2	43
8	Kryvbas Kryvyi Rih reserves	30	13	3	14	38	38	0	42
9	Vorskla Poltava reserves	30	11	8	11	45	38	+7	41
10	Metalurh Zaporizhzhia reserves	30	11	4	15	46	49	−3	37
11	Dnipro Dnipropetrovsk reserves	30	11	4	15	44	51	−7	37
12	Metalurh Donetsk reserves	30	10	6	14	39	52	−13	36
13	Arsenal Kyiv reserves	30	9	2	19	29	58	−29	29
14	Tavriya Simferopol reserves	30	6	8	16	37	54	−17	26
15	Illichivets Mariupol reserves	30	6	2	22	29	57	−28	20
16	Hoverla Uzhhorod reserves (R)	30	3	5	22	25	88	−63	14

Source: Premier League Reserves website (in Ukrainian)
Rules for classification: 1) points; 2) goal difference; 3) number of goals scored. Relegation is dependent on senior club.
(C) Champions; (R) Relegated

== Top scorers ==
Last updated 8 May 2010

Scorer	Goals	Team
(Ukraine) Yuriy Furta	15	Karpaty Lviv Reserves
(Ukraine) Artem Hromov	15 (2)	Vorskla Poltava Reserves
(Ukraine) Oleksandr Yakymenko	13 (2)	Chornomorets Odesa Reserves
(Ukraine) Yaroslav Kutsyaba	12 (8)	Karpaty Lviv Reserves
(Ukraine) Yehor Kartushov	11 (4)	Shakhtar Donetsk Reserves
(Ukraine) Yuriy Habovda	10	Karpaty Lviv Reserves
(Ukraine) Oleksandr Kosyrin	10 (4)	Chornomorets Odesa Reserves
(Ukraine) Denys Harmash	9	Dynamo Kyiv Reserves
(Ukraine) Ihor Sikorskyi	9 (1)	Zorya Luhansk Reserves
(Ukraine) Serhiy Zahynailov	8	Metalist Kharkiv Reserves
(Ukraine) Yevhen Tsvyk	8 (4)	Metalist Kharkiv Reserves

== See also ==
- 2009–10 Ukrainian Premier League
