= 2010–11 Ukrainian Premier League Reserves =

Ukrainian Premier League Reserves
- Season: 2010–11

The 2010–11 Ukrainian Premier League Reserves season was a competition between the reserves of Ukrainian Premier League Clubs. The events in the senior leagues during the 2009–10 season saw Chornomorets Odesa Reserves and Zakarpattia Reserves all relegated and replaced by the promoted teams PFC Sevastapol Reserves and Volyn Lutsk Reserves.

== Final standings ==
Pos	Team	Pld	W	D	L	GF	GA	GD	Pts
1	Shakhtar Donetsk reserves (C)	30	22	3	5	66	30	+36	69
2	Metalist Kharkiv reserves	30	16	6	8	55	36	+19	54
3	Dnipro Dnipropetrovsk reserves	30	16	6	8	49	32	+17	54
4	Karpaty Lviv reserves	30	15	5	10	71	42	+29	50
5	Illichivets Mariupol reserves	30	14	5	11	59	45	+14	47
6	Vorskla Poltava reserves	30	12	8	10	44	39	+5	44
7	Obolon Kyiv reserves	30	10	13	7	43	41	+2	43
8	Metalurh Donetsk reserves	30	11	9	10	44	34	+10	42
9	Arsenal Kyiv reserves	30	11	5	14	36	49	−13	38
10	Metalurh Zaporizhzhia reserves (R)	30	10	7	13	38	45	−7	37
11	Tavriya Simferopol reserves	30	9	8	13	35	56	−21	35
12	Zorya Luhansk reserves	30	9	6	15	29	41	−12	33
13	Volyn Lutsk reserves	30	10	3	17	45	74	−29	33
14	Dynamo Kyiv reserves	30	8	7	15	39	43	−4	31
15	Kryvbas Kryvyi Rih reserves	30	7	9	14	30	46	−16	30
16	FC Sevastopol reserves (R)	30	9	2	19	36	65	−29	29

Source: Premier League Reserves website (in Ukrainian)
Rules for classification: 1) points; 2) goal difference; 3) number of goals scored. Relegation is dependent on senior club.
(C) Champions; (R) Relegated

== Top scorers ==
Last updated May 20, 2011

Scorer	Goals	Team
(Ukraine) Oleh Barannik	13 (2)	Vorskla Poltava Reserves
(Ukraine) Yevhen Budnik	13 (2)	Metalist Kharkiv Reserves
(Ukraine) Yuriy Habovda	12	Karpaty Lviv Reserves
(Ukraine) Pylyp Budkivskyi (Note: Pylyp Budkivskyi on loan to Illichivets Mariupol in the Ukrainian Premier League during the winter break.)	12 (1)	Shakhtar Donetsk Reserves
(Ukraine) Yevhen Pavlov	11 (1)	Volyn Lutsk Reserves
(Ukraine) Oleksandr Tolstyak	11 (2)	Obolon Kyiv Reserves
(Ukraine) Oleksiy Omelchenko	9	Karpaty Lviv Reserves
(Ukraine) Oleksandr Volkov	9 (2)	Zorya Luhansk Reserves

== See also ==
- 2010–11 Ukrainian Premier League
