= 2011–12 in Ukrainian football =

Football in Ukraine
- Season: 2011–12

Men's football
- Premier League: Shakhtar Donetsk
- League 1: Hoverla Uzhhorod
- League 2: PFC Sumy
- Amateur League: Karpaty Kolomyia (2012); Nove Zhyttia Andriyivka (2011)
- Cup: Shakhtar Donetsk
- Amateur Cup: Nove Zhyttia Andriyivka (2012); FC Bucha (2011)
- Super Cup: Dynamo Kyiv

Women's football
- League High: Zhytlobud-1 Kharkiv (2012); Zhytlobud-1 Kharkiv (2011)
- Women's Cup: Naftokhimik Kalush (2012); Zhytlobud-1 Kharkiv (2011)

The 2011–12 season was the 21st season of competitive association football in Ukraine since dissolution of the Soviet Union.

== Men's club football ==
League	Promoted to league	Relegated from league
Premier League	PFC Oleksandriya; Chornomorets Odesa	FC Sevastopol; Metalurh Zaporizhzhia
League One	MFC Mykolaiv; Olimpik Donetsk	Prykarpattia Ivano-Frankivsk; ~~Feniks-Illichovets Kalinino~~
League Two	Krystal Kherson; FC Sevastopol-2 Sevastopol; Makiyivvuhillya Makiyivka; Myr Hornostayivka; Real Pharm Yuzhne; SKAD-Yalpuh Bolhrad; UkrAhroKom Pryiutivka; Slavutych Cherkasy; Avanhard Kramatorsk	~~Bastion Illichivsk~~; ~~Ros Bila Tserkva~~; ~~Veres Rivne~~; ~~Olkom Melitopol~~

Note: For all scratched clubs, see section Clubs removed for more details

=== Premier League ===
Pos	Team	Pld	W	D	L	GF	GA	GD	Pts	Qualification or relegation
1	Shakhtar Donetsk (C)	30	25	4	1	80	18	+62	79 (Note: Between Round 26 and Round 28 Dynamo Kyiv and Shakhtar Donetsk had accumulated the same number of points. With the possibility that both teams could finish the competition on the same number of points, the administration of the Premier League decided on 2 May 2012 before Round 29, that if a Golden Match was to be played to decide the championship winner, the encounter would have taken place on 13 May 2012 in Zaporizhzhia at Slavutych Arena.)	Qualification to Champions League group stage
2	Dynamo Kyiv	30	23	6	1	56	12	+44	75	Qualification to Champions League third qualifying round
3	Metalist Kharkiv	30	16	11	3	54	32	+22	59 (Note: On 12 August 2010, the Football Federation of Ukraine punished Metalist Kharkiv and Karpaty Lviv for fixing a match in 2008; both teams were handed a fine and deducted nine points each. The FFU then released a statement on 19 October 2010 that the point deductions will be applied for the 2011–12 season. However, Karpaty Lviv have indicated that they will take the matter to the Court of Arbitration for Sport (CAS) at Lausanne. No action had been taken through the season nor of any decision by the league. On 2 August 2013 CAS acknowledged the fact of game fixing between Karpaty and Metalist in 2008. The court did not approve points deduction for both of the clubs, yet suggested to have Metalist stripped of its bronze awards for the 2007–08 Ukrainian Premier League and number of players and staff from both clubs were posed penalties and fines for involvement in the game fixing. On 6 August 2013 UEFA suspended advancement of Metalist Kharkiv in the 2013–14 UEFA Champions League to the playoff round until its final decision on 13 August 2013.)	Qualification to Europa League play-off round (Note: Metalurh Donetsk qualified for the Europa League as losing finalist of the 2011–12 Ukrainian Cup to Champions League-qualified Shakhtar Donetsk. Moreover, Dnipro Dnipropetrovsk and Arsenal Kyiv were moved up a round as the cup winner spot was not used.)
4	Dnipro Dnipropetrovsk	30	15	7	8	52	35	+17	52	Qualification to Europa League play-off round
5	Arsenal Kyiv	30	14	9	7	44	27	+17	51	Qualification to Europa League third qualifying round
6	Tavriya Simferopol	30	12	9	9	43	36	+7	45	
7	Metalurh Donetsk	30	12	6	12	35	34	+1	42	Qualification to Europa League second qualifying round
8	Vorskla Poltava	30	9	10	11	38	43	−5	37	
9	Chornomorets Odesa	30	10	7	13	32	42	−10	37	
10	Kryvbas Kryvyi Rih	30	9	6	15	22	38	−16	33	
11	Illichivets Mariupol	30	8	8	14	28	42	−14	32	
12	Volyn Lutsk	30	7	6	17	25	43	−18	27	
13	Zorya Luhansk	30	6	8	16	34	58	−24	26	
14	Karpaty Lviv	30	5	8	17	27	51	−24	23	
15	Obolon Kyiv (R)	30	4	9	17	17	42	−25	21	Relegation to Ukrainian First League
16	PFC Oleksandriya (R)	30	4	8	18	24	58	−34	20	Relegation to Ukrainian First League

Source: uafootball.net.ua
Rules for classification: 1st points; 2nd goal difference; 3rd goals scored; 4th fair play
(C) Champions; (R) Relegated

=== League 1 ===
Pos	Team	Pld	W	D	L	GF	GA	GD	Pts	Promotion or relegation
1	Hoverla-Zakarpattia Uzhhorod (C, P)	34	27	3	4	67	16	+51	84	Promoted to Ukrainian Premier League
2	Metalurh Zaporizhzhia (P)	34	24	4	6	77	32	+45	76	Promoted to Ukrainian Premier League
3	FC Sevastopol	34	23	7	4	60	22	+38	76	
4	Arsenal Bila Tserkva	34	18	8	8	51	39	+12	62	
5	Krymteplitsia Molodizhne	34	17	9	8	50	38	+12	60	
6	Bukovyna Chernivtsi	34	15	12	7	38	29	+9	57	
7	Stal Alchevsk	34	14	8	12	51	50	+1	50	
8	Dynamo-2 Kyiv	34	15	5	14	39	39	0	50	
9	Helios Kharkiv	34	13	9	12	53	45	+8	48	
10	Naftovyk-Ukrnafta Okhtyrka	34	12	8	14	49	43	+6	44	
11	Zirka Kirovohrad	34	13	5	16	53	49	+4	44	
12	Olimpik Donetsk	34	11	7	16	38	44	−6	40	
13	Nyva Vinnytsia (D)	34	7	11	16	21	39	−18	32	Withdrew (Note: Nyva Vinnystia withdrew from the PFL after the season.(13 July 2012))
14	Tytan Armyansk	34	9	5	20	33	59	−26	32	
15	FC Odesa	34	7	10	17	37	51	−14	31	
16	MFK Mykolaiv (Note: MFK Mykolaiv were deducted 3 points for failure of payments of financial obligations ordered by the PFL. (31 May 2012)) (O)	34	9	4	21	33	51	−18	28	Qualification for relegation play-off
17	Enerhetyk Burshtyn (D)	34	5	4	25	26	72	−46	19	Withdrew (Note: Enerhetyk Burshtyn withdrew from the PFL after Round 32.)
18	FC Lviv (Note: FC Lviv were deducted 3 points for failure of payments of financial obligations ordered by the PFL. (31 May 2012)) (D)	34	6	3	25	21	79	−58	18	Withdrew (Note: FC Lviv withdrew from the PFL after the season.(12 July 2012))

Source: Professional Football League of Ukraine
Rules for classification: 1st points; 2nd goal difference; 3rd goals scored; 4th fair play
(C) Champions; (D) Disqualified; (O) Play-off winners; (P) Promoted

=== Promotion Relegation playoff ===
The promotion/relegation playoff stage consisted of two matches. At match one both second placed teams of the Second League groups played each other to determine the winner. At match two the match was played between the 16th place team of the First League and the winner of another playoff game between the second placed clubs from each group of the Second League.

Team 1	Score	Team 2
Desna Chernihiv	0–1	Avanhard Kramatorsk
MFC Mykolaiv	4–3	Avanhard Kramatorsk

=== League 2 ===
Pos	Team	Pld	W	D	L	GF	GA	GD	Pts	Promotion or relegation
1	FC Sumy	26	21	3	2	51	13	+38	66	Promoted to First League
2	Desna Chernihiv	26	18	5	3	48	19	+29	59	Qualified for playoff
3	Slavutych Cherkasy	26	15	8	3	35	15	+20	53	
4	Enerhiya Nova Kakhovka	26	15	7	4	50	17	+33	52	
5	UkrAhroKom Pryiutivka	26	14	6	6	43	25	+18	48	
6	Prykarpattya Ivano-Frankivsk	26	11	6	9	40	32	+8	33 (Note: Prykarpattya Ivano-Frankivsk were docked a total of 6 points due to failure of payment to former team players. Initially the club were given 18 months to satisfy the PFL decision but failed to do so and had three points. (3 November 2011) The club was docked another three points at the end of the season for failure to resolve their financial obligations. (31 May 2012) The club attempted to pass attestation for the next season. (6 June 2012) However they were expelled from the PFL when they were not included in the draw for the first round of the next season. (10 July 2012))	Expelled
7	Real Pharm Yuzhne	26	9	6	11	28	41	−13	33	
8	Krystal Kherson	26	9	5	12	30	32	−2	32	
9	Skala Stryi	26	8	4	14	26	36	−10	28	
10	Dynamo Khmelnytskyi	26	6	4	16	23	50	−27	22	
11	Chornomorets-2 Odesa	26	5	5	16	19	20	−1	20	Withdrew (Note: Chornomorets-2 Odesa withdrew from the PFL during the mid-winter break. (11 January 2012))
12	Nyva Ternopil	26	9	6	11	30	41	−11	18 (Note: Nyva Ternopil were docked a total of 15 points due to failure of payment to former team players that played between 2007–10.(28 September 2011) An additional 6 points were deducted for continuing not to resolve the first issue by 15 November 2011.(27 October 2011) An additional 6 points were deducted for not resolving this issue by the Disciplinary Committee of the Ukrainian Football Federation.(15 December 2011))	
13	Yednist' Plysky	26	3	6	17	19	57	−38	15	
14	SKAD-Yalpuh Bolhrad	26	2	1	23	10	54	−44	7	Withdrew (Note: SKAD-Yalpuh Bolhrad withdrew from the PFL prior to the start of the spring session. (4 April 2012))

Notes:

Pos	Team	Pld	W	D	L	GF	GA	GD	Pts	Promotion or relegation
1	FC Poltava	26	18	5	3	50	18	+32	59	Promoted to First League
2	Avanhard Kramatorsk	26	19	1	6	41	15	+26	58	Qualified for playoff Promoted to First League
3	Shakhtar Sverdlovsk	26	15	6	5	49	23	+26	51	
4	Hirnyk Kryvyi Rih	26	16	3	7	44	22	+22	51	
5	Kremin Kremenchuk	26	16	3	7	34	23	+11	51	
6	Stal Dniprodzerzhynsk	26	15	3	8	34	19	+15	48	
7	Myr Hornostayivka	26	13	7	6	36	26	+10	46	
8	Shakhtar-3 Donetsk	26	10	1	15	45	56	−11	31	
9	Hirnyk-Sport Komsomolsk	26	6	8	12	28	39	−11	26	
10	FC Sevastopol-2	26	7	3	16	26	51	−25	24	
11	Dnipro-2 Dnipropetrovsk	26	6	5	15	24	42	−18	23	Expelled (Note: Dnipro-2 Dnipropetrovsk was expelled from the PFL after failing to play their Round 26 fixture against Makiyivvuhillya. (6 June 2012))
12	Metalurh-2 Zaporizhzhia	26	5	3	18	19	43	−24	18	Withdrew (Note: The main clubs of Illichivets-2 Mariupol and FC Metalurh-2 Zaporizhzhia withdrew their junior clubs from PFL due to the inaugural of Ukrainian Premier League Under-19 competition which is to start next season. (6 June 2012))
13	Illichivets-2 Mariupol	26	5	2	19	25	47	−22	17	Withdrew
14	Makiyivvuhillya Makiyivka	26	5	2	19	17	48	−31	17	

=== Championship game ===
A championship game will be played between the top teams of each group competition.

2 June 2012
17:00 EEST

FC Poltava	0 – 2	FC Sumy
		Melnyk 14'; Ryabtsev 75'

Lokomotiv Stadium, Poltava
Attendance: 2,000
Referee: Ivan Bodnar (Kyiv)

=== Cup competitions ===
==== Ukrainian Cup ====
6 May 2012
19:30 EEST

Metalurh Donetsk	1 – 2 (aet)	Shakhtar Donetsk
Morozyuk 69'	Report	Teixeira 23'; Kucher 104'

Olimpiysky NSC, Kyiv
Attendance: 47,314
Referee: Anatoliy Abdula (Kharkiv)

==== Super Cup ====
5 July 2011
21:00

Shakhtar Donetsk	1–3	Dynamo Kyiv
Fernandinho 11'	Report	Husyev 5' (pen.); Diakhaté 32'; Milevskyi 83'

Vorskla Stadium, Poltava
Attendance: 24,750
Referee: Yuriy Vaks (Simferopol)

== Women's club football ==
League	Promoted to league	Relegated from league
Higher League	Voskhod Stara Maiachka	~~Lehenda-ShVSM Chernihiv~~; Ateks SDIuShOR-16 Kyiv

Note: For all scratched clubs, see section Clubs removed for more details

=== Higher League ===
2012 Vyshcha Liha (women)
