= Roman Poltavets =

Ukrainian footballer and coach

Personal information
- Full name: Roman Vadymovych Poltavets
- Date of birth: 27 July 1983 (age 43)
- Place of birth: Melitopol, Ukrainian SSR, USSR
- Height: 1.91 m (6 ft 3 in)
- Position: Striker

Senior career*
Years	Team	Apps	(Gls)
2003–2004	Tavriya Simferopol	12	(1)
2005	Spartak Ivano-Frankivsk	5	(0)
2007-2008	Olkom Melitopol	3	(1)
2008	Feniks-Illichovets Kalinine	17	(7)
2008	Lviv	10	(0)
2009	Poltava	13	(7)
2009	Helios Kharkiv	6	(3)
2010	Poltava	8	(4)
2011	Mykolaiv	11	(1)
2011–2012	Desna Chernihiv	18	(8)
2012–2013	Naftovyk-Ukrnafta Okhtyrka	22	(7)
2013	Slavutych Cherkasy	18	(1)
- * Club domestic league appearances and goals

Roman Vadymovych Poltavets (Ukrainian: Роман Вадимович Полтавець; born on 27 July 1983) is a Ukrainian retired professional footballer who played as a forward.

== Honours ==
Mykolaiv

- Ukrainian Second League: 2010–11

Desna Chernihiv

- Ukrainian Second League: Runner Up 2011–12

Individual

- Desna Chernihiv Player of the Year: 2012
