= 2009–10 in Ukrainian football =

Football in Ukraine
- Season: 2009–10

Men's football
- Premier League: Shakhtar Donetsk
- League 1: FC Sevastopol
- League 2: Bukovyna Chernivtsi (Group A); Tytan Armyansk (Group B)
- Amateur League: Myr Hornostaivka (2010); Yednist-2 Plysky (2009)
- Cup: Tavriya Simferopol
- Amateur Cup: Beregvidek Berehove (2010); Karpaty Yaremche (2009)
- Super Cup: Dynamo Kyiv

Women's football
- League High: Lehenda Chernihiv (2010); Lehenda Chernihiv (2009)
- Women's Cup: Zhytlobud-1 Kharkiv (2010); Lehenda Chernihiv (2009)

The 2009–10 season was the 19th season of competitive association football in Ukraine since dissolution of the Soviet Union.

== Men's club football ==
League	Promoted to league	Relegated from league
Premier League	Zakarpattia Uzhhorod; Obolon Kyiv	FC Lviv; FC Kharkiv
League One	Nyva Ternopil; Arsenal Bila Tserkva; Zirka Kirovohrad	~~Ihroservis Simferopol~~; ~~Knyazha Shchaslyve~~; ~~Komunalnyk Luhansk~~
League Two	FC Morshyn; FC Lviv-2	~~Desna-2 Chernihiv~~; ~~Obolon-2 Kyiv~~; ~~Knyazha-2 Shchaslyve~~; ~~Nafkom Brovary~~; ~~FC Korosten~~; ~~Dnipro Cherkasy~~; ~~Tytan Donetsk~~; ~~Arsenal Kharkiv~~; ~~PFC Sevastopol-2~~

Note: For all scratched clubs, see section Clubs removed for more details

=== Premier League ===
Pos	Team	Pld	W	D	L	GF	GA	GD	Pts	Qualification or relegation
1	Shakhtar Donetsk (C)	30	24	5	1	62	18	+44	77	Qualification to Champions League group stage
2	Dynamo Kyiv	30	22	5	3	61	16	+45	71	Qualification to Champions League third qualifying round
3	Metalist Kharkiv	30	19	5	6	49	23	+26	62	Qualification to Europa League play-off round
4	Dnipro Dnipropetrovsk	30	15	9	6	48	25	+23	54	Qualification to Europa League third qualifying round
5	Karpaty Lviv	30	13	11	6	44	35	+9	50	Qualification to Europa League second qualifying round
6	Tavriya Simferopol	30	12	9	9	38	38	0	45	Qualification to Europa League play-off round
7	Arsenal Kyiv	30	11	9	10	44	41	+3	42	
8	Metalurh Donetsk	30	11	7	12	41	33	+8	40	
9	Metalurh Zaporizhya	30	10	5	15	31	48	−17	35	
10	Vorskla Poltava	30	6	13	11	29	32	−3	31	
11	Obolon Kyiv	30	9	4	17	26	50	−24	31	
12	Illichivets Mariupol	30	7	8	15	31	56	−25	29	
13	Zorya Luhansk	30	7	7	16	23	47	−24	28	
14	Kryvbas Kryvyi Rih	30	7	4	19	31	47	−16	25	
15	Chornomorets Odesa (R)	30	5	9	16	21	44	−23	24	Relegation to Ukrainian First League
16	Zakarpattia Uzhhorod (R)	30	5	4	21	18	44	−26	19	Relegation to Ukrainian First League

Source: uafootball.net.ua
Rules for classification: 1st points; 2nd goal difference; 3rd goals scored; 4th fair play
(C) Champions; (R) Relegated

=== League 1 ===
Pos	Team	Pld	W	D	L	GF	GA	GD	Pts	Promotion or relegation
1	PFC Sevastopol (C, P)	34	24	4	6	68	27	+41	76	Promoted to Ukrainian Premier League
2	Volyn Lutsk (P)	34	22	8	4	71	30	+41	74	Promoted to Ukrainian Premier League
3	Stal Alchevsk	34	19	8	7	55	35	+20	65	
4	FC Lviv	34	19	6	9	49	22	+27	63	
5	PFC Oleksandria	34	19	6	9	58	34	+24	63	
6	Krymteplitsia Molodizhne	34	17	8	9	53	28	+25	59	
7	Naftovyk-Ukrnafta Okhtyrka	34	17	6	11	45	37	+8	57	
8	Desna Chernihiv (D)	34	12	12	10	38	30	+8	48	Withdrew (Note: Desna Chernihiv completed the season but failed attestation for the 2010-11 season and their licence was removed. (June 21st, 2010))
9	Arsenal Bila Tserkva	34	12	10	12	48	44	+4	46	
10	Helios Kharkiv	34	12	10	12	42	47	−5	46	
11	Dniester Ovidiopol	34	12	8	14	44	47	−3	44	
12	Zirka Kirovohrad (Note: Zirka Kirovohrad deducted 3 points for failure of payment to contracted players. (January 28th, 2010))	34	11	13	10	38	40	−2	43	
13	Dynamo-2 Kyiv	34	12	5	17	35	46	−11	41	
14	Feniks-Illichivets Kalinine	34	10	7	17	39	52	−13	37	
15	Enerhetyk Burshtyn	34	8	11	15	32	49	−17	35	
16	Prykarpattya Ivano-Frankivsk	34	5	7	22	26	68	−42	22	
17	FC Kharkiv (D)	34	3	5	26	23	76	−53	14	Withdrew (expelled) from PFL (Note: FC Kharkiv were relegated to the Second League. After the season completed the club failed attestation and their license was withdrawn by the respective committee of the Football Federation of Ukraine for providing false information of the club's affairs.(June 23rd, 2010))
18	Nyva Ternopil (Note: Nyva Ternopil initially deducted 3 points for failure of payment of license fees. (October 2nd, 2009) Another 3 points were for non payment to players. (June 9th, 2010)) (R)	34	3	4	27	18	72	−54	7	Relegated to Ukrainian Second League

Source: Professional Football League of Ukraine
Rules for classification: 1st points; 2nd goal difference; 3rd goals scored; 4th fair play
(C) Champions; (D) Disqualified; (P) Promoted; (R) Relegated

=== League 2 ===
Pos	Team	Pld	W	D	L	GF	GA	GD	Pts	Promotion or relegation
1	FC Bukovyna Chernivtsi	20	15	3	2	35	12	+23	48	Promoted to First League
2	PFC Nyva Vinnytsia	20	12	4	4	43	16	+27	40	Playoff game winner Promoted to First League
3	FC Bastion Illichivsk	20	11	7	2	44	20	+24	40	
4	MFK Mykolaiv	20	11	6	3	30	13	+17	39	
5	FC Dynamo Khmelnytskyi	20	10	3	7	28	16	+12	33	
6	FC Yednist' Plysky	20	8	5	7	22	21	+1	29	
7	FC Ros Bila Tserkva	20	6	3	11	18	30	−12	21	
8	FC Lviv-2	20	4	7	9	13	25	−12	19	Withdrew (Note: Karpaty-2 Lviv and FC Lviv-2 did not renew their license after the season.)
9	FC Veres Rivne	20	4	4	12	16	41	−25	16	
10	FC Karpaty-2 Lviv	20	5	1	14	17	43	−26	16	Withdrew
11	FC Skala Morshyn	20	1	3	16	11	40	−29	6	Name change (Note: FC Skala Morshyn renamed themselves from FC Morshyn during the winter break.)

Notes:

Pos	Team	Pld	W	D	L	GF	GA	GD	Pts	Promotion or relegation
1	Tytan Armyansk	26	21	3	2	50	20	+30	66	Promoted to First League
2	Kremin Kremenchuk	26	15	9	2	41	21	+20	54	Playoff game
3	FC Poltava	26	16	6	4	34	16	+18	54	
4	Stal Dniprodzerzhynsk	26	15	6	5	38	23	+15	51	
5	Olimpik Donetsk	26	15	4	7	45	28	+17	49	
6	Shakhtar Sverdlovsk	26	13	7	6	26	15	+11	46	
7	Shakhtar-3 Donetsk	26	10	6	10	33	29	+4	36	
8	FC Sumy	26	10	6	10	32	34	−2	36	(Note: Sumy completed the season but failed license attestation from the Professional Football League of Ukraine for the next season due to various administrative and financial issues.)
9	Hirnyk Kryvyi Rih	26	8	4	14	29	43	−14	28	
10	Olkom Melitopol	26	7	5	14	31	42	−11	26	
11	Hirnyk-Sport Komsomolsk	26	5	7	14	21	35	−14	22	
12	Illichivets-2 Mariupol	26	4	3	19	16	40	−24	15	
13	Dnipro-75 Dnipropetrovsk	26	4	5	17	19	21	−2	14 (Note: Dnipro-75 Dnipropetrovsk deducted 3 points by the PFL on August 27, 2009 due to failure of payment of league dues.)	Expelled
14	Metalurh-2 Zaporizhzhia	26	3	1	22	18	66	−48	10	

=== Playoff game ===
At the meeting of the Professional Football League of Ukraine after the season, it was confirmed that Ukrainian First League team FC Desna Chernihiv failed attestation and hence would have their license withdrawn. To allow an extra team to be promoted, the PFL determined that a playoff game between the 2nd placed teams from Druha Liha – Kremin Kremenchuk and Nyva Vinnytsia would determine the vacancy created. This playoff game was played June 28, 2010.

June 28, 2010
17:00 UTC+3

Kremin Kremenchuk	0 – 2	Nyva Vinnytsia
	Report	Kozban 12'; Nayko 48'

Central Stadium, Makariv
Attendance: 700
Referee: Dmytro Kutakov (Brovary)

=== Cup competitions ===
==== Ukrainian Cup ====
2010-05-16
17:00 LST

Tavriya Simferopol	3 – 2 (aet)	Metalurh Donetsk
Feschuk 2'; Kovpak 40' (pen.); Idahor 97'	Report	Mkhitaryan 50'; Mário Sérgio 74'

Metalist Stadium, Kharkiv
Attendance: 21,000
Referee: Oleh Derevynsky

==== Super Cup ====
11 July 2009

Dynamo Kyiv	0–0	Vorskla Poltava
	Report
Penalties
Ninković (penalty scored); Kravchenko (penalty scored); Yarmolenko (penalty scored); Eremenko (penalty scored)	4–2	Curri (penalty scored); Markoski (penalty scored); Despotovski (penalty missed); Dallku (penalty missed)

Yuvileiny Stadium, Sumy
Attendance: 18,500
Referee: Yevhen Herenda (Kalush)

== Women's club football ==
League	Promoted to league	Relegated from league
Higher League	Voskhod Stara Maiachka	~~Lehenda-ShVSM Chernihiv~~; Ateks SDIuShOR-16 Kyiv

Note: For all scratched clubs, see section Clubs removed for more details

=== Higher League ===
2010 Vyshcha Liha (women)
