= 2012–13 in Ukrainian football =

Football in Ukraine
- Season: 2012–13

Men's football
- Premier League: Shakhtar Donetsk
- League 1: FC Sevastopol
- League 2: Desna Chernihiv
- Amateur League: ODEK Orzhiv (2013); Karpaty Kolomyia (2012)
- Cup: Shakhtar Donetsk
- Amateur Cup: Chaika P. Borshchahivka (2013); Nove Zhyttia Andriyivka (2012)
- Super Cup: Shakhtar Donetsk

Women's football
- League High: Zhytlobud-1 Kharkiv (2013); Zhytlobud-1 Kharkiv (2012)
- League 1: Medyk Morshyn (2013)
- Women's Cup: Zhytlobud-1 Kharkiv (2013); Naftokhimik Kalush (2012)

The 2012–13 season was the 22nd season of competitive association football in Ukraine since dissolution of the Soviet Union.

== Men's club football ==
League	Promoted to league	Relegated from league
Premier League	Hoverla-Zakarpattia Uzhhorod; Metalurh Zaporizhzhia	Obolon Kyiv; PFC Oleksandriya
League One	FC Sumy; FC Poltava; Avanhard Kramatorsk	~~Nyva Vinnytsia~~; ~~Enerhetyk Burshtyn~~; ~~FC Lviv~~
League Two	SKA Odesa; Obolon-2 Kyiv; Zhemchuzhyna Yalta; FC Ternopil; FC Poltava-2 Karlivka	~~Prykarpattia Ivano-Frankivsk~~; ~~SKAD-Yalpuh Bolhrad~~; ~~Chornomorets-2 Odesa~~; ~~Dnipro-2 Dnipropetrovsk~~; ~~Metalurh-2 Zaporizhzhia~~; ~~Illichivets-2 Mariupol~~

Note: For all scratched clubs, see section Clubs removed for more details

=== Premier League ===
Pos	Team	Pld	W	D	L	GF	GA	GD	Pts	Qualification or relegation
1	Shakhtar Donetsk (C)	30	25	4	1	82	18	+64	79	Qualification for the Champions League group stage
2	Metalist Kharkiv	30	20	6	4	59	25	+34	66	Qualification for the Champions League third qualifying round
3	Dynamo Kyiv	30	20	2	8	55	23	+32	62	Qualification for the Europa League play-off round
4	Dnipro Dnipropetrovsk	30	16	8	6	54	27	+27	56	Qualification for the Europa League play-off round
5	Metalurh Donetsk	30	14	7	9	45	35	+10	49	Qualification for the Europa League third qualifying round
6	Chornomorets Odesa	30	12	7	11	32	36	−4	43	Qualification for the Europa League second qualifying round
7	Kryvbas Kryvyi Rih (D)	30	12	7	11	36	41	−5	43	Club expelled after season (Note: Kryvbas Kryvyi Rih were denied a license for the 2013–14 season due to financial problems and were expelled.)
8	Arsenal Kyiv	30	10	9	11	34	41	−7	39	
9	Illichivets Mariupol	30	10	8	12	30	32	−2	38	
10	Zorya Luhansk	30	10	7	13	32	43	−11	37	
11	Tavriya Simferopol	30	10	5	15	27	46	−19	32 (Note: Tavria Simferopol were deducted 3 points for non compliance with contractual agreements with player agents (regarding Makhach Gadzhiyev).)	
12	Vorskla Poltava	30	8	7	15	31	36	−5	31	
13	Volyn Lutsk	30	7	8	15	26	45	−19	29	
14	Karpaty Lviv	30	7	6	17	37	52	−15	27	
15	Hoverla Uzhhorod	30	5	7	18	29	57	−28	22	
16	Metalurh Zaporizhya	30	1	8	21	12	64	−52	11	

Source: uafootball.net.ua
Rules for classification: 1st points; 2nd goal difference; 3rd goals scored; 4th head-to-head points; 5th head-to-head goal difference; 6th head-to-head goals scored; 7th fair play; 8th draw (Regulation, p.52-53).
(C) Champions; (D) Disqualified

=== League 1 ===
Pos	Team	Pld	W	D	L	GF	GA	GD	Pts	Promotion or relegation
1	Sevastopol (C, P)	34	22	8	4	71	22	+49	74	Promoted to Ukrainian Premier League
2	Stal Alchevsk	34	20	6	8	58	35	+23	66	Refused promotion (Note: Stal Alchevsk finished in second place were to be promoted to the Ukrainian Premier League but their club administration refused promotion indicating that they did not have adequate resources and infrastructure and would have to play to their games away from Alchevsk. PFC Oleksandria that placed third also refused promotion to the Ukrainian Premier League. The reason is that the club did not earn the promotion on the sports principle. Bukovyna Chernivtsi submitted all required documentation to the Football Federation of Ukraine and the Ukrainian Premier League on June 13, 2013. On June 14, 2013 the Attestation Committee of FFU refused to issue attestation for Bukovyna. The reason is that the club never applied for the Premier League attestation. On June 18, 2013 the Executive Committee of FFU allowed both Hoverla Uzhhorod and Metalurh Zaporizhzhia to stay in the Premier League.)
3	Oleksandriya	34	17	9	8	48	35	+13	60	Refused promotion
4	Bukovyna Chernivtsi	34	16	10	8	49	33	+16	58	Not allowed for promotion
5	Naftovyk-Ukrnafta Okhtyrka	34	15	9	10	39	31	+8	54	
6	Mykolaiv (Note: MFK Mykolaiv was given one month by the PFL to pay their league dues. The club failed to pay the dues in time and were deducted 3 points. (21 August 2012))	34	16	9	9	45	41	+4	54	
7	Avanhard Kramatorsk	34	15	8	11	37	26	+11	53	
8	Zirka Kirovohrad	34	14	10	10	46	37	+9	52	
9	Sumy	34	14	8	12	32	35	−3	50	
10	Helios Kharkiv	34	12	13	9	33	21	+12	49	
11	Olimpik Donetsk	34	15	4	15	34	37	−3	49	
12	Tytan Armyansk	34	13	9	12	44	40	+4	48	
13	Poltava	34	11	12	11	35	35	0	45	
14	Krymteplytsia Molodizhne (D)	34	9	8	17	30	45	−15	35	Withdrew from PFL (Note: Krymteplitsia Molodizhne completed the season but withdrew from the PFL. The team's administration informed the PFL that their club will exist only with a youth sports program. (11 June 2013))
15	Dynamo-2 Kyiv (O)	34	8	6	20	31	55	−24	30	Qualification for relegation play-off
16	Odesa (D)	34	7	3	24	21	63	−42	24	Relegation play-off – Withdrew from PFL
17	Obolon Kyiv (D)	34	5	7	22	19	28	−9	22	Withdrew from PFL (Note: Obolon Kyiv withdrew from the PFL during the attestion meeting held in the winter break. The team's administration informed the PFL that they lack sufficient funds to continue participating in the league. (21 February 2013))
18	Arsenal Bila Tserkva (R)	34	5	5	24	23	76	−53	20	Relegated to Ukrainian Second League

Source: Professional Football League of Ukraine
Rules for classification: 1st points; 2nd goal difference; 3rd goals scored; 4th head-to-head points; 5th head-to-head goal difference; 6th head-to-head goals scored; 7th fair play; 8th draw
(C) Champions; (D) Disqualified; (O) Play-off winners; (P) Promoted; (R) Relegated

=== Promotion/relegation play-off ===
A promotion/relegation home and away play-off were played by the 2nd team in Group 1 and 2 of 2012–13 Ukrainian Second League against the 15th and 16th placed teams of the 2012–13 Ukrainian First League competition. The draw for the play-off matches was held on 7 June.

Nyva Ternopil qualified from Ukrainian Second League.

Team 1	Agg.	Team 2	1st leg	2nd leg
FC Odesa	1–6	FC Nyva Ternopil	0–2	1–4
FC Shakhtar Sverdlovsk	1–2	FC Dynamo-2 Kyiv	1–1	0–1

=== Group A ===
Pos	Team	Pld	W	D	L	GF	GA	GD	Pts	Qualification
1	Desna Chernihiv	20	14	6	0	35	12	+23	48	Qualified for Second stage Group 1
2	Nyva Ternopil	20	11	5	4	29	17	+12	38	Qualified for Second stage Group 1
3	FC Ternopil	20	11	2	7	31	20	+11	35	Qualified for Second stage Group 1
4	Slavutych Cherkasy	20	10	4	6	26	18	+8	34	Qualified for Second stage Group 1
5	Skala Stryi	20	9	6	5	19	15	+4	33	Qualified for Second stage Group 1
6	Real Pharm Yuzhne	20	8	6	6	23	25	−2	30	Qualified for Second stage Group 1
7	Krystal Kherson	20	6	2	12	23	31	−8	20	Qualified for Second stage Group 3
8	Yednist' Plysky	20	5	5	10	17	30	−13	20	Withdrew (Note: Yednist' Plysky withdrew from the PFL after the first stage. The Vice President of the club informed that the club would return to the amateur leagues citing that there was no financial incentive to play in the second stage of the competition. (26 December 2012))
9	Obolon-2 Kyiv	20	5	3	12	21	30	−9	18	Withdrew (Note: Both Obolon-2 Kyiv and SCA Odesa withdrew from the PFL during the attestation meeting held in the winter break. Both teams' administration informed the PFL that they lacked sufficient funds to continue participating in the league. (21 February 2013))
10	Dynamo Khmelnytskyi	20	4	5	11	12	22	−10	17	Qualified for Second stage Group 3
11	SCA Odesa	20	4	2	14	17	33	−16	14	Withdrew

Source: Professional Football League of Ukraine
Rules for classification: 1st points; 2nd goal difference; 3rd goals scored; 4th fair play

=== Group B ===
Pos	Team	Pld	W	D	L	GF	GA	GD	Pts	Qualification
1	UkrAhroKom Holovkivka	24	15	5	4	38	17	+21	50	Qualified for Second stage Group 2
2	Shakhtar-3 Donetsk	24	15	3	6	57	22	+35	48	Qualified for Second stage Group 2
3	Shakhtar Sverdlovsk	24	13	6	5	33	18	+15	45	Qualified for Second stage Group 2
4	Poltava-2 Karlivka	24	11	11	2	29	15	+14	44	Qualified for Second stage Group 2
5	Kremin Kremenchuk	24	12	7	5	39	21	+18	43	Qualified for Second stage Group 2
6	Myr Hornostayivka	24	13	3	8	37	33	+4	42	Qualified for Second stage Group 2
7	Hirnyk Kryvyi Rih	24	10	7	7	35	26	+9	37	Qualified for Second stage Group 4
8	Stal Dniprodzerzhynsk	24	10	3	11	47	30	+17	33	Qualified for Second stage Group 4
9	FC Sevastopol-2	24	7	2	15	25	44	−19	23	Qualified for Second stage Group 4
10	Enerhiya Nova Kakhovka	24	5	6	13	25	50	−25	21	Qualified for Second stage Group 4
11	Hirnyk-Sport Komsomolsk	24	5	3	16	25	50	−25	18	Qualified for Second stage Group 4
12	Makiyivvuhillya Makiyivka	24	5	2	17	21	58	−37	17	Qualified for Second stage Group 4
13	Zhemchuzhyna Yalta	24	4	4	16	21	48	−27	13 (Note: Zhemchuzhyna Yalta was given one month by the PFL to pay their league dues. The club failed to pay the dues in time and were docked 3 points. (21 August 2012))	Qualified for Second stage Group 4

Source: Professional Football League of Ukraine
Rules for classification: 1st points; 2nd goal difference; 3rd goals scored; 4th fair play

=== Championship groups ===
==== Group 1 ====
Pos	Team	Pld	W	D	L	GF	GA	GD	Pts	Promotion or qualification
1	Desna Chernihiv	30	20	9	1	55	22	+33	69	Promoted to First League
2	Nyva Ternopil	30	16	9	5	47	22	+25	57	Qualified for Play-off game
3	Slavutych Cherkasy	30	15	7	8	47	28	+19	52	
4	FC Ternopil	30	15	4	11	43	34	+9	49	
5	Skala Stryi	30	10	7	13	25	41	−16	37	
6	Real Pharm Yuzhne	30	9	9	12	35	49	−14	36	

Source: Professional Football League of Ukraine
Rules for classification: 1st points; 2nd goal difference; 3rd goals scored; 4th fair play

==== Group 2 ====
Pos	Team	Pld	W	D	L	GF	GA	GD	Pts	Promotion or qualification
1	UkrAhroKom Holovkivka	34	20	7	7	51	25	+26	67	Promoted to First League
2	Shakhtar Sverdlovsk	34	19	9	6	47	26	+21	66	Qualified for Play-off game
3	Shakhtar-3 Donetsk	34	20	5	9	72	37	+35	65	
4	Poltava-2 Karlivka	34	13	16	5	41	27	+14	55	
5	Kremin Kremenchuk	34	12	14	8	46	31	+15	50	
6	Myr Hornostayivka	34	14	6	14	42	46	−4	48	

Source: Source: Professional Football League of Ukraine
Rules for classification: 1st points; 2nd goal difference; 3rd goals scored; 4th fair play

=== Championship final ===
The title of the Second League Champion was contested by the Group 1 and Group 2 winners at the end of the season. The matches were played in a home and away series. The draw for the matches was made on 6 June 2013.

Team 1	Agg.	Team 2	1st leg	2nd leg
Desna Chernihiv	3–3 (a)	UkrAhroKom Holovkivka	2–0	1–3

=== Relegation groups ===
For sponsorship purposes the tournament titled as the Favbet Tournament and as previously planned is composed of two groups. Due to a number of withdrawals during the winter break the PFL had to make some adjustments in competition structure for the Second Stage for Groups 3 and 4 from the original plans.

==== Group 3 ====
Pos	Team	Pld	W	D	L	GF	GA	GD	Pts	Status
1	Enerhia Nova Kakhovka	6	6	0	0	14	3	+11	18	
2	Krystal Kherson	6	4	0	2	13	7	+6	12	
3	Zhemchuzhyna Yalta	6	1	1	4	5	10	−5	4	Expelled (Note: Zhemchuzhyna Yalta were expelled from the PFL after they were denied attestation by league administration for the next season due to the club's financial situation.)
4	FC Dynamo Khmelnytskyi	6	0	1	5	1	13	−12	1	

Source: Professional Football League of Ukraine
Rules for classification: 1st points; 2nd goal difference; 3rd goals scored; 4th fair play

==== Group 4 ====
Pos	Team	Pld	W	D	L	GF	GA	GD	Pts	Status
1	Hirnyk Kryvyi Rih	32	14	8	10	49	37	+12	50	
2	Stal Dniprodzerzhynsk	32	15	4	13	63	40	+23	49	
3	Hirnyk-Sport Komsomolsk	32	10	4	18	39	57	−18	34	
4	Makiyivvuhillya Makiyivka	32	8	3	21	32	71	−39	27	
5	FC Sevastopol-2	32	7	4	21	30	63	−33	25	Withdrew (Note: The administration of FC Sevastopol withdrew their reserve team from the PFL after the main team was promoted to the Ukrainian Premier League. The reserves will compete in the Reserves competition.)

Source: Professional Football League of Ukraine
Rules for classification: 1st points; 2nd goal difference; 3rd goals scored; 4th fair play

=== Cup competitions ===
==== Ukrainian Cup ====
22 May 2013
19:45 EEST

Shakhtar Donetsk	3 – 0	Chornomorets Odesa
Fernandinho 41'; Teixeira 53'; Taison 73'	Report

OSK "Metalist", Kharkiv
Attendance: 40,003
Referee: Yevhen Aranovsky (Kyiv)

==== Super Cup ====
10 July 2012

Metalurh Donetsk	0–2	Shakhtar Donetsk
	Report	Adriano 6'; Costa 35'

Avanhard Stadium, Luhansk
Attendance: 21,050
Referee: Anatoliy Abdula

== Women's club football ==
League	Promoted to league	Relegated from league
Higher League	Voskhod Stara Maiachka	~~Lehenda-ShVSM Chernihiv~~; Ateks SDIuShOR-16 Kyiv

Note: For all scratched clubs, see section Clubs removed for more details

=== Higher League ===
2013 Vyshcha Liha (women)
