= Andriy Kruhlyak =

Ukrainian footballer

Personal information
- Full name: Andriy Kruhlyak
- Date of birth: 22 April 1986 (age 40)
- Place of birth: Kiev, Ukrainian SSR, Soviet Union
- Height: 1.78 m (5 ft 10 in)
- Position: Forward

Senior career*
Years	Team	Apps	(Gls)
2003–2009	Dynamo Kyiv	1	(0)
2003–2006	→ Dynamo-2 Kyiv	67	(12)
2003	→ Dynamo-3 Kyiv	8	(2)
2006	→ Metalurh Zaporizhya (loan)	1	(0)
2007	→ Liepājas Metalurgs (loan)	22	(2)
2008	→ Arsenal Kyiv (loan)	0	(0)
2009–2010	Dnister Ovidiopol	6	(0)
2010	Nyva Vinnytsia	12	(1)
2011	Prykarpattya Ivano-Frankivsk	10	(2)
2011	Desna Chernihiv	13	(3)
2012	Kremin Kremenchuk	20	(1)
2013	Arsenal Bila Tserkva	2	(0)
2013	Nyva Ternopil	4	(0)
2013	Desna Chernihiv	4	(0)
- * Club domestic league appearances and goals as of 6 May 2013

Andriy Kruhlyak (Russian: Андрей Кругляк; born 22 April 1986) is a retired football striker from Ukraine.

== Career ==
Kruhlyak began his career at Dynamo-2 Kyiv in the Ukrainian First Division in 2002. In 2007, after 77 league appearances and 12 goals for the club, he moved to Latvia to play for Virsliga club FK Liepājas Metalurgs on loan. On 2 August 2007, Kruhlyak scored as Metalurgs beat Belarusian club FC Dinamo Brest 3–1 in the UEFA Cup 2007-08 first qualifying round.

== Honours ==
Club

- Virsliga Runners-up (1): 2007
- Baltic League Champions (1): 2007
