= Oleksandr Bohach =

Ukrainian footballer

Personal information
- Full name: Oleksandr Anatoliyovych Bohach
- Date of birth: 26 February 1983 (age 43)
- Place of birth: Kukushkine, Rozdolne Raion, Crimean Oblast, Ukrainian SSR, USSR
- Height: 1.85 m (6 ft 1 in)
- Position: Defender

Senior career*
Years	Team	Apps	(Gls)
2000–2001	Tytan Armiansk	3	(0)
2001–2003	Tavriya Simferopol	3	(0)
2001–2003	→ Dynamo Simferopol (loan)	48	(0)
2003–2004	Polissya Zhytomyr	28	(1)
2004–2005	Dynamo-IhroService Simferopol	39	(1)
2006	Oleksandriya	8	(0)
2006–2007	Olkom Melitopol	26	(0)
2007–2008	Mykolaiv	30	(1)
2008–2009	Krymteplytsia Molodizhne	14	(0)
2009	Desna Chernihiv	2	(0)
2009	Foros Yalta		
2009	Syhma Kherson		
2010	Myr Hornostayivka		
2010	Mykolaiv	9	(0)
2011	Hvardiyets Hvardiiske		
2012	Torpedo Mykolaiv		
2013	Tavriya Novotroitske		
2016	Rubin Yalta		
2016–2017	KFU-Bakhchisaray		
- * Club domestic league appearances and goals

Oleksandr Anatoliyovych Bohach (Ukrainian: Олександр Анатолійович Богач) is a Ukrainian retired footballer.

== Career ==
Oleksandr Bohach was a Pupil of UOR Simferopol. After graduation, he played for the Tytan Armiansk. Since 2001 in Tavriya Simferopol. He played three matches in the top league of the Ukrainian championship. Debut - September 22, 2001 in a game with "Metalist" (1: 4).

After "Tavria" he played in the clubs of the Ukrainian First League and Ukrainian Second League: Dynamo Simferopol, Polissya Zhytomyr, Oleksandriya, Olkom Melitopol, Mykolaiv, Krymteplytsia Molodizhne. In summer 2009 he moved to Desna Chernihiv, the main club of the city of Chernihiv, here he played two matches. In 2011 he became the champion of Crimea under Vladislav Maltsev in the Guards. In 2012 he played in the Nikolaev "Torpedo". In the beginning of 2013 because of rejuvenation of structure of the Nikolaev team, he continued the career in the Tavriya Simferopol team.
