= Valeriy Radchenko =

Soviet and Ukrainian football player

Personal information
- Full name: Радченко Валерий Валерьевич
- Date of birth: 19 December 1988 (age 37)
- Place of birth: Ukraine SSR, USSR
- Height: 1.84 m (6 ft 0 in)
- Position: Midfielder

Senior career*
Years	Team	Apps	(Gls)
2005–2007	Dynamo-3 Kyiv	10	(3)
2008–2010	Poltava	7	(5)
2010–2011	Sumy	3	(1)
2011–2012	Krymteplytsia Molodizhne	3	(0)
2011–2012	Desna Chernihiv	11	(1)
2012–2013	Poltava	4	(0)
2012–2013	Poltava-2 Karlivka	3	(0)
2014	Bucha	20	(2)
- * Club domestic league appearances and goals as of 9 December 2021

Valeriy Radchenko (Ukrainian: Радченко Валерий Валерьевич) is a retired Ukrainian football player.

== Career ==
Valeriy Radchenko, started his career in 2003 at Dynamo-3 Kyiv in Kyiv until 2007, where he played 10 games and scoring 3 goals. In 2008 he moved to Poltava for one season and in 2010 he moved to Sumy where he played 3 matches. In 2011 he moved to Krymteplytsia Molodizhne. In the same season he moved to Desna Chernihiv, the main club of Chernihiv, where he played 11 matches and scored 1 goal. In 2012 he returned to Poltava and Bucha.

== Honours ==
Sumy

- Ukrainian Second League: Runner-Up 2010–11
