= Ruslan Yermolenko =

Soviet footballer and Ukrainian coach

Personal information
- Full name: Ruslan Mykolayovych Yermolenko
- Date of birth: 18 October 1983 (age 43)
- Place of birth: Chernihiv, Ukrainian SSR, USSR
- Height: 1.84 m (6 ft 0 in)
- Position: Midfielder

Senior career*
Years	Team	Apps	(Gls)
1998–2002	Dynamo Kyiv	0	(0)
1998–2002	→ Dynamo-3 Kyiv	62	(9)
1998–2002	→ Dynamo-2 Kyiv	44	(5)
2002–2003	Obolon Kyiv	8	(0)
2003	→ Obolon-2 Kyiv	5	(0)
2003	Nyva Vinnytsia	13	(2)
2004	Metalist Kharkiv	1	(0)
2004	→ Metalist-2 Kharkiv	8	(1)
2004–2005	Nyva Vinnytsia	30	(3)
2005–2006	Stal Alchevsk	7	(0)
2006	Borysfen Boryspil	10	(0)
2007	Desna Chernihiv	30	(2)
2008	Dnister Ovidiopol	32	(3)
2009	Feniks-Illichovets Kalinine	11	(0)
2009–2010	Desna Chernihiv	16	(4)
2010–2011	Krymteplytsia Molodizhne	10	(1)
2014–2015	Arsenal Kyiv	2	(1)
- * Club domestic league appearances and goals

Ruslan Mykolayovych Yermolenko (Ukrainian: Руслан Миколайович Єрмоленко) is a Ukrainian retired footballer. Yermolenko is credited as being possibly the youngest player ever played in the Ukrainian Cup.

== Club career ==
Ruslan Yermolenko started his football career in the football system of Dynamo Kyiv playing for its reserve teams in lower leagues from 1998 until 2002. He made his professional debut on 18 June 1998 for FC Dynamo-3 Kyiv when he came out as a substitute for Dmytro Bermudes in a home win against FC Borysfen Boryspil.

In the beginning of the 2002–03 he was transferred out to Dynamo's city rivals Obolon Kyiv for which Yermolenko finally made his debut in the Ukrainian Premier League, when on 2 September 2002 he came out as a substitute for Oleh Tymchyshyn in home win against FC Metalurh Zaporizhia. After a winter break later that season he was demoted to reserves and played for Obolon-2 Kyiv.

In 2003 he played for Metalist Kharkiv and Metalist-2 Kharkiv. In 2004 he returned to Nyva Vinnytsia where he played 30 matches and scored 3 goal. In 2005 he played for Stal Alchevsk, Borysfen Boryspil and in 2006 he moved to Desna Chernihiv the main club of the city of Chernihiv where he played 2 seasons, playing 30 matches and scored 2 goals. In 2007 he moved to Dnister Ovidiopol playing 32 matches and 11 matches with Feniks-Illichovets Kalinine. In 2009 he returned to Desna Chernihiv, where he played 16 matches and scored 4 goals. In 2010 he played 10 matches with Krymteplytsia Molodizhne and scoring 1 goal. In 2014 he moved to Arsenal Kyiv.

== International career ==
Yermolenko was a member of the Ukraine national U-18 team that qualified for the 2001 UEFA European Under-18 Championship in Finland.

== Honours ==
Dynamo Kyiv

- Ukrainian Cup: (1) 2002

Metalist Kharkiv

- Ukrainian First League: (1) 2003–04

Dynamo-2 Kyiv

- Ukrainian First League: (3) 1998–99, 1999–2000, 2000–01
