= 2010–11 in Ukrainian football =

Football in Ukraine
- Season: 2010–11

Men's football
- Premier League: Shakhtar Donetsk
- League 1: PFC Oleksandriya
- League 2: MFC Mykolaiv (Group A); Olimpik Donetsk (Group B)
- Amateur League: Nove Zhyttia Andriyivka (2011); Myr Hornostaivka (2010)
- Cup: Shakhtar Donetsk
- Amateur Cup: FC Bucha (2011); Beregvidek Berehove (2010)
- Super Cup: Shakhtar Donetsk

Women's football
- League High: Zhytlobud-1 Kharkiv (2011); Lehenda Chernihiv (2010)
- Women's Cup: Zhytlobud-1 Kharkiv (2011); Zhytlobud-1 Kharkiv (2010)

The 2010–11 season was the 20th season of competitive association football in Ukraine since dissolution of the Soviet Union.

== Men's club football ==
| League | Promoted to league | Relegated from league |
|---|---|---|
| Premier League | FC Sevastopol; Volyn Lutsk | Chornomorets Odesa; Zakarpattia Uzhhorod |
| League One | Bukovyna Chernivtsi; Nyva Vinnytsia; Tytan Armyansk | ~~Desna Chernihiv~~; ~~FC Kharkiv~~; Nyva Ternopil |
| League Two | Enerhiya Nova Kakhovka; Chornomorets-2 Odesa; Dnipro-2 Dnipropetrovsk; FC Sumy (readmitted); Desna Chernihiv (readmitted) | ~~FC Sumy~~; ~~Dnipro-75 Dnipropetrovsk~~; ~~FC Lviv-2~~; ~~Karpaty-2 Lviv~~ |

Note: For all scratched clubs, see section Clubs removed for more details

=== Premier League ===
| Pos | Team | Pld | W | D | L | GF | GA | GD | Pts | Qualification or relegation |
|---|---|---|---|---|---|---|---|---|---|---|
| 1 | Shakhtar Donetsk (C) | 30 | 23 | 3 | 4 | 53 | 16 | +37 | 72 | Qualification to Champions League group stage |
| 2 | Dynamo Kyiv | 30 | 20 | 5 | 5 | 60 | 24 | +36 | 65 | Qualification to Champions League third qualifying round |
| 3 | Metalist Kharkiv | 30 | 18 | 6 | 6 | 58 | 26 | +32 | 60 | Qualification to Europa League play-off round |
| 4 | Dnipro Dnipropetrovsk | 30 | 16 | 9 | 5 | 46 | 20 | +26 | 57 | Qualification to Europa League play-off round |
| 5 | Karpaty Lviv | 30 | 13 | 9 | 8 | 41 | 34 | +7 | 48 | Qualification to Europa League third qualifying round |
| 6 | Vorskla Poltava | 30 | 10 | 9 | 11 | 37 | 32 | +5 | 39 | Qualification to Europa League second qualifying round (Note: Since the 2011 Ukrainian Cup Final was between 2 teams that had already qualified for the 2011–12 UEFA Champions League (Shakhtar Donetsk and Dynamo Kyiv) the 6th placed team (Vorskla Poltava) qualified for the 2011–12 UEFA Europa League.) |
| 7 | Tavriya Simferopol | 30 | 10 | 9 | 11 | 44 | 46 | −2 | 39 | |
| 8 | Metalurh Donetsk | 30 | 11 | 5 | 14 | 36 | 45 | −9 | 38 | |
| 9 | Arsenal Kyiv | 30 | 10 | 7 | 13 | 36 | 38 | −2 | 37 | |
| 10 | Obolon Kyiv | 30 | 9 | 7 | 14 | 26 | 38 | −12 | 34 | |
| 11 | Volyn Lutsk | 30 | 9 | 7 | 14 | 27 | 49 | −22 | 34 | |
| 12 | Zorya Luhansk | 30 | 7 | 9 | 14 | 28 | 40 | −12 | 30 | |
| 13 | Kryvbas Kryvyi Rih | 30 | 6 | 11 | 13 | 27 | 45 | −18 | 29 | |
| 14 | Illichivets Mariupol | 30 | 7 | 8 | 15 | 45 | 67 | −22 | 29 | |
| 15 | Sevastopol (R) | 30 | 7 | 6 | 17 | 26 | 48 | −22 | 27 | Relegation to Ukrainian First League |
| 16 | Metalurh Zaporizhzhia (R) | 30 | 6 | 6 | 18 | 18 | 40 | −22 | 24 | Relegation to Ukrainian First League |

Source: uafootball.net.ua
Rules for classification: 1st points; 2nd goal difference; 3rd goals scored; 4th fair play
(C) Champions; (R) Relegated

=== League 1 ===
| Pos | Team | Pld | W | D | L | GF | GA | GD | Pts | Promotion or relegation |
|---|---|---|---|---|---|---|---|---|---|---|
| 1 | PFC Oleksandria (C, P) | 34 | 21 | 6 | 7 | 55 | 25 | +30 | 69 | Promoted to Ukrainian Premier League |
| 2 | Chornomorets Odesa (P) | 34 | 18 | 11 | 5 | 53 | 26 | +27 | 65 | Promoted to Ukrainian Premier League |
| 3 | Stal Alchevsk | 34 | 18 | 8 | 8 | 55 | 31 | +24 | 62 | |
| 4 | Krymteplitsia Molodizhne | 34 | 18 | 7 | 9 | 43 | 30 | +13 | 61 | |
| 5 | FC Lviv | 34 | 17 | 8 | 9 | 52 | 28 | +24 | 59 | |
| 6 | Zakarpattia Uzhhorod | 34 | 16 | 8 | 10 | 51 | 40 | +11 | 56 | |
| 7 | Bukovyna Chernivtsi | 34 | 17 | 5 | 12 | 48 | 45 | +3 | 56 | |
| 8 | Dynamo-2 Kyiv | 34 | 15 | 7 | 12 | 39 | 35 | +4 | 52 | |
| 9 | Arsenal Bila Tserkva | 34 | 15 | 6 | 13 | 42 | 43 | −1 | 51 | |
| 10 | Nyva Vinnytsia | 34 | 14 | 8 | 12 | 44 | 42 | +2 | 50 | |
| 11 | Tytan Armyansk | 34 | 13 | 5 | 16 | 32 | 42 | −10 | 44 | |
| 12 | Zirka Kirovohrad | 34 | 12 | 7 | 15 | 43 | 44 | −1 | 43 | |
| 13 | Dnister Ovidiopol | 34 | 10 | 12 | 12 | 39 | 42 | −3 | 42 | |
| 14 | Naftovyk-Ukrnafta Okhtyrka | 34 | 10 | 11 | 13 | 40 | 44 | −4 | 41 | |
| 15 | Helios Kharkiv | 34 | 10 | 10 | 14 | 31 | 44 | −13 | 40 | |
| 16 | Enerhetyk Burshtyn (O) | 34 | 10 | 6 | 18 | 29 | 49 | −20 | 36 | Qualification for relegation play-off |
| 17 | Prykarpattya Ivano-Frankivsk (R) | 34 | 5 | 1 | 28 | 27 | 82 | −55 | 16 | Relegated to Ukrainian Second League |
| 18 | Feniks-Illichovets Kalinino (Note: Feniks-Illichovets Kalinino deducted 3 points by the PFL on February 9, 2011 due to failure of payment of league dues.) (D) | 34 | 3 | 2 | 29 | 17 | 48 | −31 | 8 | Withdrew (expelled) from PFL (Note: Prior to the resumption of competition after the winter break the club ceased operations and withdrew from the PFL.) |

Source: Professional Football League of Ukraine
Rules for classification: 1st points; 2nd goal difference; 3rd goals scored; 4th fair play
(C) Champions; (D) Disqualified; (O) Play-off winners; (P) Promoted; (R) Relegated

=== Promotion/Relegation playoff ===
The promotion/relegation playoff stage consisted of two matches. For sponsorship reasons it was named as Umbro playoffs. At match one both second placed teams of the Second League groups played each other to determine the winner. At match two the match was played between the 16th place team of the First League and the winner of another playoff game between the second placed clubs from each group of the Second League.

| Team 1 | Score | Team 2 |
|---|---|---|
| FC Sumy | 2–0 | FC Poltava |
| Enerhetyk Burshtyn | 2–0 | FC Sumy |

=== League 2 ===
| Pos | Team | Pld | W | D | L | GF | GA | GD | Pts | Promotion or relegation |
|---|---|---|---|---|---|---|---|---|---|---|
| 1 | MFK Mykolaiv | 22 | 15 | 3 | 4 | 29 | 12 | +17 | 48 | Promoted to First League |
| 2 | FC Sumy | 22 | 14 | 3 | 5 | 38 | 13 | +25 | 45 | Play-off |
| 3 | Enerhiya Nova Kakhovka | 22 | 13 | 5 | 4 | 38 | 17 | +21 | 44 | |
| 4 | Bastion Illichivsk | 22 | 13 | 4 | 5 | 38 | 16 | +22 | 43 | Withdrew (Note: Bastion Illichivsk completed the season but withdrew from the PFL prior to the start of the next season. (July 15, 2011)) |
| 5 | Desna Chernihiv | 22 | 12 | 4 | 6 | 38 | 24 | +14 | 40 | |
| 6 | Chornomorets-2 Odesa | 22 | 10 | 6 | 6 | 27 | 17 | +10 | 36 | |
| 7 | Skala Stryi | 22 | 10 | 5 | 7 | 26 | 19 | +7 | 35 | Renamed (Note: Skala Stryi renamed themselves from Skala Morshyn. (February 10, 2011)) |
| 8 | Yednist' Plysky | 22 | 10 | 2 | 10 | 39 | 26 | +13 | 32 | |
| 9 | Dynamo Khmelnytskyi | 22 | 7 | 4 | 11 | 19 | 29 | −10 | 22 (Note: Dynamo Khmelnytskyi, Nyva Ternopil, Ros' Bila Tserkva and Veres Rivne deducted 3 points by the PFL on February 9, 2011 due to failure of payment of league dues.) | |
| 10 | Nyva Ternopil | 22 | 5 | 2 | 15 | 17 | 51 | −34 | 14 | |
| 11 | Ros Bila Tserkva | 22 | 3 | 2 | 17 | 20 | 58 | −38 | 8 | Expelled (Note: Ros Bila Tserkva completed the season but had their license revoked prior to the start of next season. (July 4, 2011)) |
| 12 | Veres Rivne | 22 | 0 | 0 | 22 | 4 | 51 | −47 | −3 | Expelled (Note: Veres Rivne were expelled from the PFL due to their financial situation. (April 29, 2011).) |

Notes:

| Pos | Team | Pld | W | D | L | GF | GA | GD | Pts | Promotion or relegation |
|---|---|---|---|---|---|---|---|---|---|---|
| 1 | Olimpik Donetsk | 22 | 17 | 2 | 3 | 45 | 15 | +30 | 53 | Promoted to First League |
| 2 | FC Poltava | 22 | 15 | 3 | 4 | 41 | 21 | +20 | 48 | Play-off |
| 3 | Kremin Kremenchuk | 22 | 13 | 4 | 5 | 37 | 20 | +17 | 43 | |
| 4 | Stal Dniprodzerzhynsk | 22 | 10 | 7 | 5 | 32 | 18 | +14 | 37 | |
| 5 | Hirnyk Kryvyi Rih | 22 | 10 | 5 | 7 | 32 | 26 | +6 | 35 | |
| 6 | Shakhtar Sverdlovsk | 22 | 10 | 3 | 9 | 25 | 30 | −5 | 33 | |
| 7 | Shakhtar-3 Donetsk | 22 | 8 | 5 | 9 | 38 | 37 | +1 | 29 | |
| 8 | Illichivets-2 Mariupol | 22 | 9 | 0 | 13 | 20 | 37 | −17 | 27 | |
| 9 | Hirnyk-Sport Komsomolsk | 22 | 6 | 4 | 12 | 17 | 29 | −12 | 22 | |
| 10 | Metalurh-2 Zaporizhzhia | 22 | 5 | 4 | 13 | 18 | 43 | −25 | 19 | |
| 11 | Olkom Melitopol | 22 | 5 | 2 | 15 | 21 | 22 | −1 | 17 | withdrew (Note: Olkom Melitopol withdrew from the PFL during the mid-winter break.) |
| 12 | Dnipro-2 Dnipropetrovsk | 22 | 3 | 3 | 16 | 13 | 41 | −28 | 9 (Note: Dnipro-2 Dnipropetrovsk deducted 3 points by the PFL on February 9, 2011 due to failure of payment of league dues.) | |

=== Cup competitions ===
==== Ukrainian Cup ====
25 May 2011
20:15 EEST

| Dynamo Kyiv | 0 – 2 | Shakhtar Donetsk |
|---|---|---|
| | Report | Eduardo 64'; Luiz Adriano 87' |

Yuvileiny Stadium, Sumy
Attendance: 27,800
Referee: Victor Shvetsov (Odesa)

==== Super Cup ====
4 July 2010
20:45

| Shakhtar Donetsk | 7–1 | Tavriya Simferopol |
|---|---|---|
| Hladkyi 2', 51'; Jádson 35'; Willian 67'; Adriano 78', 85'; Raț 90' | Report | Feshchuk 32' |

Slavutych Arena, Zaporizhia
Attendance: 10,500
Referee: Andriy Shandor (Lviv)

== Women's club football ==
| League | Promoted to league | Relegated from league |
|---|---|---|
| Higher League | Voskhod Stara Maiachka | ~~Lehenda-ShVSM Chernihiv~~; Ateks SDIuShOR-16 Kyiv |

Note: For all scratched clubs, see section Clubs removed for more details

=== Higher League ===
2011 Vyshcha Liha (women)
