= Maksym Havrylenko =

Ukrainian footballer

Personal information
- Full name: Maksym Serhiyovych Havrylenko
- Date of birth: 18 August 1991 (age 35)
- Place of birth: Odesa, Soviet Union (now Ukraine)
- Height: 1.69 m (5 ft 7 in)
- Position: Midfielder

Team information
- Current team: Kramatorsk

Youth career
- 2004–2007: Chornomorets Odesa

Senior career*
Years	Team	Apps	(Gls)
2007–2012	Chornomorets Odesa	0	(0)
2010–2011	→ Chornomorets-2 Odesa	24	(3)
2012	Desna Chernihiv	9	(1)
2012	SKA Odesa	12	(2)
2012–2013	Odesa	11	(0)
2013–2014	Sumy	23	(0)
2014–2017	Dacia Chișinău	59	(4)
2017	→ Dinamo-Auto Tiraspol (loan)	5	(0)
2018	Zhemchuzhyna Odesa	8	(1)
2018–2020	Mynai	42	(2)
2020–2021	Polissya Zhytomyr	26	(2)
2022–	Kramatorsk	0	(0)

International career^{‡}
2007–2008	Ukraine U17	6	(0)
2008–2009	Ukraine U18	5	(0)
- * Club domestic league appearances and goals as of 19 January 2022 ‡ National team caps and goals as of 4 May 2018

Maksym Serhiyovych Havrylenko (Ukrainian: Максим Сергійович Гавриленко; born 18 August 1991) is a Ukrainian professional football midfielder who plays for Kramatorsk.
