= Yaroslav Kutsyaba =

Ukrainian footballer

Personal information
- Full name: Yaroslav Stepanovych Kutsyaba
- Date of birth: 12 April 1989 (age 37)
- Place of birth: Stoyaniv, Radekhiv Raion, Lviv Oblast, Ukrainian SSR
- Height: 1.84 m (6 ft 0 in)
- Position: Midfielder

Youth career
- 2002–2006: FC Karpaty Lviv

Senior career*
Years	Team	Apps	(Gls)
2006–2012	FC Karpaty Lviv	0	(0)
2006–2008	FC Karpaty-2 Lviv	48	(1)
2010	→ MFC Mykolaiv	8	(1)
2011	→ FC Prykarpattya Ivano-Frankivsk	9	(0)
2012	→ FC Lviv	9	(0)
2012–?	FC Spyrtovyk Lopatyn (amateur)	14	(1)

International career^{‡}
2005	Ukraine-16	4	(0)
2005–2006	Ukraine-17	7	(0)
2006	Ukraine-18	2	(0)
- * Club domestic league appearances and goals as of 26 February 2013 ‡ National team caps and goals as of 26 February 2013

Yaroslav Stepanovych Kutsyaba (Ukrainian: Ярослав Степанович Куцяба; born 12 April 1989) is a professional Ukrainian football midfielder.

== Career ==
Yaroslav Kutsyaba played on loan for Ukrainian Second League club MFC Mykolaiv. He is the product of the Karpaty Lviv Youth School System.
