= Oleksandr Tolstyak =

Ukrainian footballer

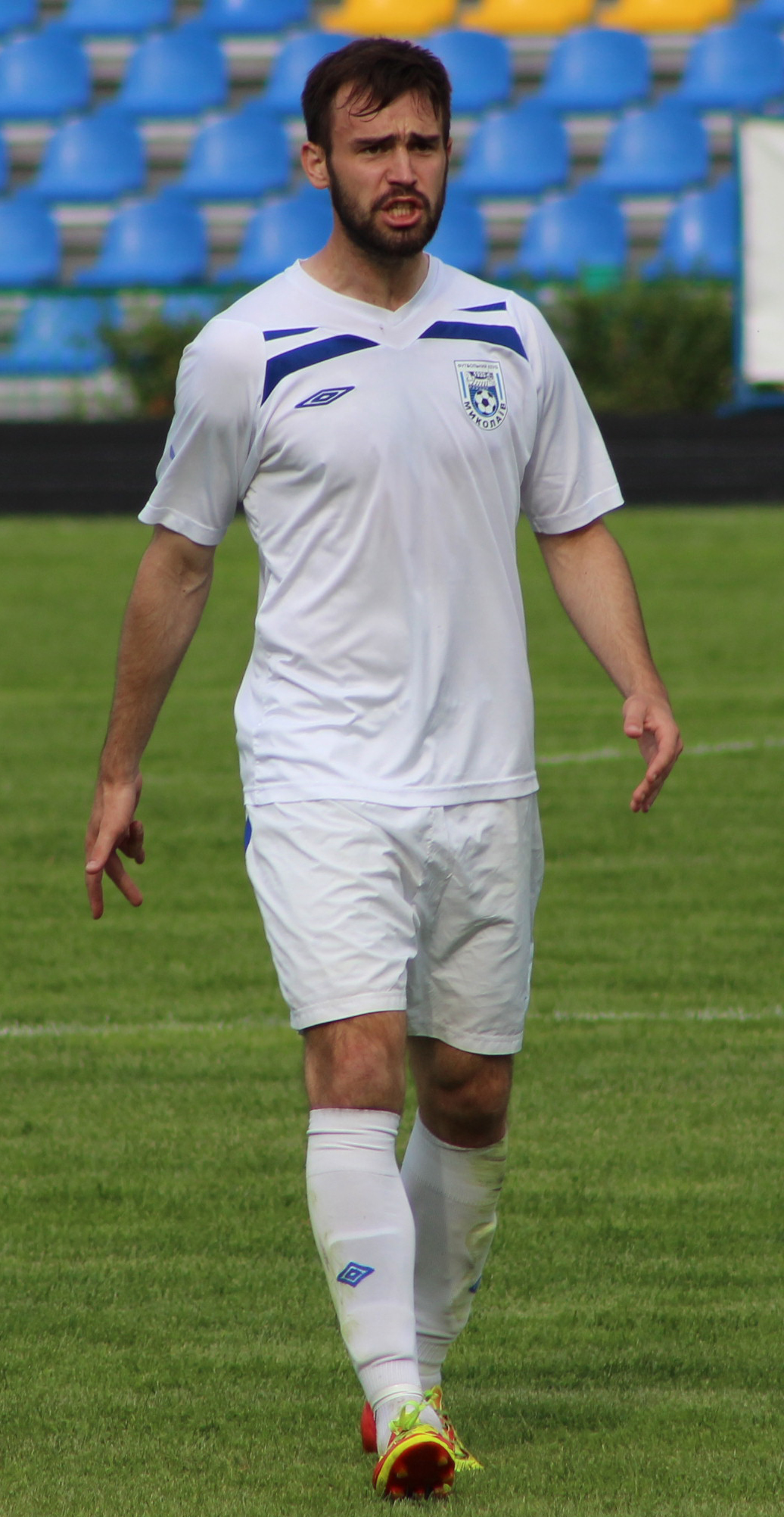

Personal information
- Full name: Oleksandr Arkadiyovych Tolstyak
- Date of birth: 4 February 1990 (age 36)
- Place of birth: Netishyn, Khmelnytskyi Oblast, Ukrainian SSR
- Height: 1.90 m (6 ft 3 in)
- Position: Midfielder

Youth career
- 2001–2002: KDYSS Enerhetyk Netishyn
- 2003–2007: RVUFK Kyiv

Senior career*
| Years | Team | Apps | (Gls) |
| 2010–2013 | Obolon Kyiv | 16 | (1) |
| 2012 | Obolon-2 Kyiv | 7 | (2) |
| 2013 | Bukovyna Chernivtsi | 0 | (0) |
| 2013 | Arsenal Bila Tserkva | 2 | (0) |
| 2013 | Zirka Kirovohrad | 4 | (0) |
| 2014 | Mykolaiv | 7 | (1) |
| 2014–2015 | Bukovyna Chernivtsi | 13 | (2) |
| 2017 | KS Chwaszczyno | 16 | (1) |
| Total | | 65 | (7) |
- * Club domestic league appearances and goals

Oleksandr Tolstyak (Ukrainian: Олександр Аркадійович Толстяк; born 4 February 1990) is a Ukrainian former professional footballer who played as a midfielder.

Tolstyak is the product of RVUFK Kyiv's Youth Sportive School. In February 2013 he signed a contract with Bukovyna Chernivtsi.
