= Yuriy Furta =

Ukrainian footballer

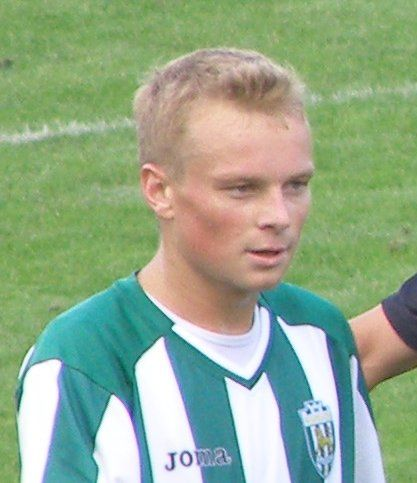
- Furta in 2009

Personal information
- Full name: Yuriy Yaroslavovych Furta
- Date of birth: 30 August 1988 (age 38)
- Place of birth: Lviv, Soviet Union, (now Ukraine)
- Height: 1.72 m (5 ft 8 in)
- Position: Forward

Youth career
- 2001–2002: Karpaty Lviv
- 2002: UFK Lviv
- 2002–2003: Karpaty Lviv
- 2003: FC Arsenal Kyiv
- 2003–2005: Karpaty Lviv

Senior career*
Years	Team	Apps	(Gls)
2005–2011	Karpaty Lviv	6	(1)
2005–2008	→ Karpaty-2 Lviv	50	(15)
2010	→ Oleksandriya (loan)	11	(1)
2011	→ Arsenal Bila Tserkva (loan)	6	(1)
2011	Enerhetyk Burshtyn	9	(0)
2012–2015	Desna Chernihiv	67	(14)
2015	Rukh Vynnyky	10	(4)
2015–2017	Piast Żmigród	28	(9)
2017–2019	Victoria Żmudź		(27)
2020	Sambir		
2020–2021	Karpaty Lviv		
2021	SCC Demnya		
2021	Karyer-Dnister Torchynovychi		

International career
2009	Ukraine U-21	2	(1)
- * Club domestic league appearances and goals

Yuriy Yaroslavovych Furta (Ukrainian: Юрій Ярославович Фурта; born 30 August 1988) is a Ukrainian former professional footballer who played as a striker. He is the product of the Karpaty Lviv Youth school system. Furta was promoted to the senior team at the beginning of the 2008–09 season.

== Career ==
=== Oleksandria ===
He transferred on loan to Oleksandriya in 2010.

=== Desna Chernihiv ===
In 2012 he moved to Desna Chernihiv, the main club in Chernihiv, here he won with the club the Ukrainian Second League in the 2012–13 season.

=== Sambir & Karpaty Lviv ===
In 2020, he moved from Sambir to Karpaty Lviv in Ukrainian Second League.

== Honours ==
Desna Chernihiv

- Ukrainian Second League: 2012–13

Individual

- Ukrainian Premier League Reserves top scorer: 2009–10 (15 goals)
