= Andriy Kandaurov =

Ukrainian footballer and coach (born 1987)

Personal information
- Full name: Кандауров Андрій Володимирович
- Date of birth: 24 October 1987 (age 39)
- Place of birth: Ukrainian SSR, USSR
- Height: 1.84 m (6 ft 0 in)
- Position: Midfielder

Senior career*
Years	Team	Apps	(Gls)
2003–2005	Metalurh-2 Zaporizhzhia	25	(7)
2005–2006	Obolon-2 Kyiv	13	(3)
2006–2007	Obolon Kyiv	6	(2)
2006–2007	Obolon-2 Kyiv	24	(9)
2007–2009	Obolon Kyiv	40	(10)
2008–2009	Mykolaiv	5	(1)
2008–2009	Obolon-2 Kyiv	1	(0)
2009–2010	Desna Chernihiv	25	(2)
2010–2011	Lviv	15	(1)
2010–2014	Helios Kharkiv	68	(6)
- * Club domestic league appearances and goals as of 25 December 2021

Andrey Kandaurov (Ukrainian: Кандауров Андрій Володимирович; born 24 October 1987) is a Ukrainian footballer and coach, who played as a midfielder.

== Career ==
Andrey Kandaurov, started his career with Metalurh-2 Zaporizhzhia where he played 25 matches and scored 7 goals. In 2005, h2 moved to Obolon-2 Kyiv, playing 13 matches and scored 3 goals and in 2006 he moved to Obolon Kyiv playing 6 matches and scored 2 goals and with Obolon-2 Kyiv playing 24 matches and scored 9 goals. In 2007, he returned to Obolon Kyiv for two seasons where he played 40 matches and scored 10 goals. In 2007, he played 5 matched and scored 1 goal. In 2009, he moved for one season for Desna Chernihiv the main club in the city of Chernihiv. In 2011 he moved to Helios Kharkiv until 2014 where he played 68 matches and scored 6 goals.

== Honours ==
Obolon Kyiv

- Ukrainian First League: 2008–09
