= Yaroslav Serdyuk =

Ukrainian footballer (born 1990)

Personal information
- Full name: Сердюк Ярослав Васильевич
- Date of birth: 21 June 1990 (age 36)
- Place of birth: Chernihiv Ukrainian SSR, USSR
- Position: Midfielder

Youth career
- 2007: Yunist Chernihiv

Senior career*
Years	Team	Apps	(Gls)
2006-2007	Desna Chernihiv	65	(2)
2010	FC Sevastopol-2	10	(1)
2010-2011	FC Sevastopol	8	(0)
2010-2012	Desna Chernihiv	16	(0)
2012-2013	FC Yednist' Plysky	19	(0)
2013-2014	Zhemchuzhina Yalta	5	(1)
2014-2015	Desna Chernihiv	1	(0)
2015	YSB Chernihiv	0	(0)
2017	FC Chernihiv	6	(0)
- * Club domestic league appearances and goals

Yaroslav Serdyuk (Russian: Сердюк Ярослав Васильевич; born 21 June 1990) is a Ukrainian former footballer who played as a midfielder.

== Career ==
Yaroslav Serdyuk. started his career in 2007 in Yunist Chernihiv. He moved to Desna Chernihiv, the main club in Chernihiv, here he played 65 matches and scored 2 goals.

In 2010 he moved to FC Sevastopol-2, where he played 10 goals and he scored 1 goal and he moved to the main team FC Sevastopol. After that he returned to Desna Chernihiv, where he played 16 matches. In 2012 he moved to FC Yednist' Plysky, where he played 19 matches, and to Zhemchuzhina Yalta. In 2014, he returned to Desna Chernihiv, where he played only 1 match.
