= Andriy Rad =

Ukrainian footballer

Personal information
- Full name: Andriy Volodymyrovych Rad
- Date of birth: 16 March 1988 (age 38)
- Place of birth: Lviv, Ukrainian SSR
- Height: 1.90 m (6 ft 3 in)
- Position: Goalkeeper

Team information
- Current team: LNZ Cherkasy (goalkeeping coach)

Youth career
- 2002–2005: Karpaty Lviv

Senior career*
| Years | Team | Apps | (Gls) |
| 2005–2007 | Karpaty-2 Lviv | 0 | (0) |
| 2007–2011 | Lviv | 12 | (0) |
| 2011–2012 | Obolon Kyiv | 0 | (0) |
| 2012–2013 | Krymteplytsia Molodizhne | 6 | (0) |
| 2013 | Desna Chernihiv | 2 | (0) |
| 2013 | Bory Borynychi | 3 | (0) |

Managerial career
- 2020–2022: Rukh Lviv (U19 goalkeeping coach)
- 2022–2025: Rukh Lviv (goalkeeping coach)
- 2025-: LNZ Cherkasy (goalkeeping coach)
- * Club domestic league appearances and goals

Andriy Volodymyrovych Rad (Ukrainian: Андрій Володимирович Радь; born 16 March 1988) is a Ukrainian former professional footballer who played as a goalkeeper and current goalkeeping coach of Rukh Lviv.

== Honours ==
Desna Chernihiv

- Ukrainian Second League: 2012–13
