= Oleksiy Pavelko =

Ukrainian footballer

Personal information
- Full name: Павелько Алексей Владимирович
- Date of birth: 12 May 1986 (age 40)
- Place of birth: Zaporizhzhia, Ukrainian SSR
- Height: 1.84 m (6 ft 0 in)
- Position: Midfielder

Senior career*
Years	Team	Apps	(Gls)
2005–2006	Polissya Zhytomyr	13	(1)
2006–2008	Hirnyk Kryvyi Rih	46	(1)
2008–2009	Dnipro Cherkasy	18	(1)
2008–2009	Yednist Plysky	6	(0)
2009–2010	Olkom Melitopol	49	(0)
2010–2011	Feniks-Illichovets Kalinine	15	(0)
2010–2012	Desna Chernihiv	27	(4)
2012–2016	Naftovyk Okhtyrka	77	(3)
2016–2017	Helios Kharkiv	7	(0)
2016–2018	Inhulets Petrove	34	(0)
2010–2011	Inhulets-2 Petrove	3	(0)
- * Club domestic league appearances and goals as of 8 December 2021

Oleksiy Pavelko (Ukrainian: Павелько Алексей Владимирович; born 12 May 1986) is a Ukrainian football player.

== Career ==
Pavelko is started his career in Polissya Zhytomyr for one season then he moved to Polissya Zhytomyr for two season where he played 46 matches. In 2008 he moved for one season to Dnipro Cherkasy, Yednist Plysky and Olkom Melitopol. In 2010 he moved to Feniks-Illichovets Kalinine and to Desna Chernihiv for two season where he played 27 matches and scored 4 goals. In 2012 he moved to Naftovyk Okhtyrka until 2016 where he played 77 matches and scored 3 goals. In summer 2016 his contract with the club was ended. In 2017 He signed first with Helios Kharkiv and then he moved for two season in Inhulets Petrove. where he played 34 matches and he played also 3 matches with Inhulets-2 Petrove.
