= Serhiy Hrybanov =

Ukrainian footballer (born 1981)

Personal information
- Full name: Serhiy Olehovych Hrybanov
- Date of birth: 17 November 1981 (age 44)
- Place of birth: Zhdanov, Ukrainian SSR, Soviet Union
- Height: 1.80 m (5 ft 11 in)
- Position: Forward

Youth career
- 1998–1999: FC UOR Donetsk

Senior career*
Years	Team	Apps	(Gls)
2000–2001	FC Shakhtar-3 Donetsk	7	(2)
2000–2001	FC Shakhtar-2 Donetsk	42	(3)
2002–2004	FC Illichivets-2 Mariupol	5	(1)
2002–2005	FC Illichivets Mariupol	73	(13)
2006	SC Tavriya Simferopol	1	(0)
2006	FC Stal Alchevsk	4	(0)
2007	FC Stal Dniprodzerzhynsk	33	(9)
2008–2009	FC Helios Kharkiv	21	(2)
2009–2010	FC Desna Chernihiv	28	(13)
2010	PFC Oleksandria	16	(2)
2011	FC Sevastopol	12	(1)
2012	FC Desna Chernihiv	9	(3)
2012–2013	FC Olimpik Donetsk	19	(5)
- * Club domestic league appearances and goals as of 7 May 2013

Serhiy Olehovych Hrybanov (Ukrainian: Сергій Олегович Грибанов; born 17 November 1981) is a Ukrainian former professional footballer who played as a forward.

== Honours ==
Individual

- Desna Chernihiv Player of the Year: 2010
