= Andriy Ilyashov =

Ukrainian footballer

Personal information
- Full name: Ильяшов Андрей Степанович
- Date of birth: 20 December 1982 (age 43)
- Place of birth: Ukrainian SSR, USSR
- Height: 1.84 m (6 ft 0 in)
- Position: Forward

Senior career*
Years	Team	Apps	(Gls)
1998–2003	Metalurh-2 Zaporizhzhia	77	(23)
2000–2003	Metalurh Zaporizhzhia	17	(1)
2002–2003	Mykolaiv	9	(1)
2003–2005	Metalurh Zaporizhzhia	8	(1)
2003–2004	Metalurh-2 Zaporizhzhia	17	(12)
2006	Shakhtar Sverdlovsk	4	(0)
2006–2008	Stal Kamianske	41	(5)
2008–2009	Ihroservice Simferopol	29	(7)
2009–2010	Desna Chernihiv	17	(1)
2013	Avanhard Kramatorsk	8	(7)
2013–2015	Hirnyk Kryvyi Rih	46	(16)
2015	Kolos Zachepylivka	2	(0)
- * Club domestic league appearances and goals as of 25 December 2021

Andriy Ilyashov (Ukrainian: Ільяшов Андрій Степанович) is a Ukrainian retired footballer.

== Career ==
He began to play Metalurh-2 Zaporizhzhia and for Metalurh Zaporizhzhia, Mykolaiv, Stal Kamianske. In Ukrainian Premier League, he played 25 matches and scored 2 goals, all for Metalurh. In the First League he played 68 matches and scored 8 goals.

Now he plays for the club Desna Chernihiv the club in the city of Chernihiv, plays under number 23. In 2013 he moved to Avanhard Kramatorsk. In 2014 he moved to Hirnyk Kryvyi Rih for two season where he played 46 matches and scored 16 goals. In 2015, he moved to Kolos Zachepylivka.
