= Serhiy Ilin =

Ukrainian footballer

Personal information
- Full name: Ильин Сергей Иванович
- Date of birth: 10 January 1987 (age 39)
- Place of birth: Chernivtsi, Ukrainian
- Height: 1.84 m (6 ft 0 in)
- Position: Midfielder

Senior career*
Years	Team	Apps	(Gls)
2004–2006	FC Shakhtar Donetsk	0	(0)
2004–2006	→ FC Shakhtar-3 Donetsk	18	(0)
2006	→ FC Shakhtar-2 Donetsk	0	(0)
2008–2009	Helios Kharkiv	2	(0)
2008–2009	Sheriff Tiraspol	11	(0)
2009–2010	Bukovyna Chernivtsi	15	(0)
2010–2012	Desna Chernihiv	8	(0)
2011–2012	Nyva Ternopil	16	(1)
2012	Jelgava	24	(4)
2013–2015	Bukovyna Chernivtsi	12	(1)
- * Club domestic league appearances and goals as of 8 December 2021

Serhiy Ilin (Ukrainian: Ильин Сергей Иванович) is a Ukrainian football player.

== Career ==
Serhiy Ilin is a pupil of the football school Bukovyna Chernivtsi. He made his first steps at a professional debut in FC Shakhtar-3 Donetsk for the third and second teams. During the season 2006-2008 for the brace of Kryvbas Kryvyi Rih and Zorya Luhansk, where in total he played 42 matches and scored 6 goals. In 2009 he played in the amateur team of FC Luzhany.

He spent most of his career in various clubs of the first and second leagues of Ukrainian football. In particular, in such clubs as Bukovyna Chernivtsi, Nyva Ternopil, Desna Chernihiv, Helios Kharkiv and FC "Poltava". He also spent part of his career in the top leagues of Moldova and Latvia, in such clubs as Sheriff Tiraspol and Jelgava.

For the first time playing in the amateur team "Hutsulshchina" (Kosov). Since 2015, he has repeatedly become the winner of various regional competitions. In the summer of 2018, he became the owner of the regional Cup, and in November - the owner of the Super Cup as part of FC Korovia. He is also works as a trainer at the Bukovina Children's and Youth Sports School.

== Personal life ==
He is married and has a daughter, Anastasia.
