= Oleksiy Pospyelov =

Ukrainian footballer

Personal information
- Full name: Oleksiy Mykhaylovych Pospyelov
- Date of birth: 10 September 1990 (age 36)
- Place of birth: Ukrainian SSR, USSR
- Height: 1.84 m (6 ft 0 in)
- Position: Midfielder

Senior career*
Years	Team	Apps	(Gls)
2007–2008	CSKA Kyiv	11	(0)
2008–2009	Feniks-Illichovets Kalinine	8	(1)
2008–2009	Knyazha-2 Shchaslyve	16	(1)
2009–2010	Desna Chernihiv	23	(1)
2011–2013	Obolon Kyiv	2	(0)
2012–2013	Obolon-2 Kyiv	14	(3)
2015	Dinaz Vyshhorod	4	(2)
2015	Arsenal Kyiv	2	(0)
2016–2017	Yednist Plysky	10	(1)
2017–2019	Avanhard Bziv	36	(4)
- * Club domestic league appearances and goals as of 27 January 2022

Oleksiy Mykhaylovych Pospyelov (Ukrainian: Олексій Михайлович Поспєлов; born 10 September 1990) is a Ukrainian retired footballer.

== Career ==
Andrey Kandaurov, started his career with CSKA Kyiv in 2007, where he played 11 match. In summer 2008 he moved to Feniks-Illichovets Kalinine where he played 8 matches and scored 1 goal. In January 2009 he moved Knyazha-2 Shchaslyve, the reserve team of Knyazha Shchaslyve in the village of Shchaslyve (to the west of Boryspil), here he played 16 matches and scored 1 goal. In summer 2009 he moved to Desna Chernihiv the club in the city of Chernihiv in Ukrainian First League where in the season 2009–10 he played 23 matches and scored 1 goal but the team was relegated in Ukrainian Second League. Then in summer 2011, he moved to Obolon Kyiv where he played 2 matches and in the same season has been sent to Obolon-2 Kyiv the reserve squad.
