= Petro Kondratyuk =

Ukrainian former footballer

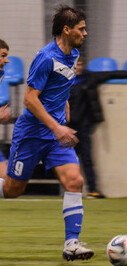
- Kondratyuk in 2015

Personal information
- Full name: Petro Petrovych Kondratyuk
- Date of birth: 21 April 1979 (age 47)
- Place of birth: Shchaslyve, Boryspil Raion, Kyiv Oblast, Ukrainian SSR, Soviet Union
- Height: 1.81 m (5 ft 11 in)
- Position: Midfielder

Senior career*
Years	Team	Apps	(Gls)
1995	CSKA-Borysfen Kyiv	1	(0)
1997	Rostselmash-d Rostov-on-Don	3	(0)
1997–2000	Borysfen Boryspil	97	(19)
2000	→ Rihonda Bila Tserkva (loan)	4	(2)
2001–2004	Vorskla Poltava	44	(0)
2001–2004	→ Vorskla-2 Poltava	52	(18)
2004–2005	Nyva Vinnytsia	31	(13)
2005–2006	Stal Alchevsk	21	(0)
2006–2007	Vorskla Poltava	20	(3)
2007	Illichivets Mariupol	11	(3)
2007	→ Illichivets-2 Mariupol	3	(0)
2008	Dnipro Cherkasy	17	(7)
2008–2010	Desna Chernihiv	41	(3)
2010–2011	Lviv	20	(5)
2011–2015	Desna Chernihiv	122	(26)
2016	Patriot Baryshivka	10	(0)
2016–2019	Avanhard Bziv	20	(0)
- * Club domestic league appearances and goals

Petro Petrovych Kondratyuk (Ukrainian: Петро Петрович Кондратюк; born 21 April 1979) is a Ukrainian former professional footballer who played as a midfielder.

== Honours ==
Avanhard Bziv

- Ukrainian Amateur Cup: 2018–19
- Kyiv Oblast Championship: 2017, 2018

Desna Chernihiv

- Ukrainian Second League: 2012–13

Individual

- Desna Chernihiv Player of the Year: 2013
