= Dmytro Yevstafiyev =

Soviet footballer and Ukrainian coach

Personal information
- Full name: Dmytro Oleksandrovych Yevstafiyev
- Date of birth: 3 January 1985 (age 41)
- Place of birth: Haisyn, Ukrainian SSR, USSR
- Height: 1.84 m (6 ft 0 in)
- Position: Midfielder

Youth career
- 2000–2001: Chornomorets Odesa

Senior career*
Years	Team	Apps	(Gls)
2001–2004	Chornomorets-2 Odesa	51	(0)
2003	Chornomorets Odesa	0	(0)
2004–2006	Podillya Khmelnytskyi	48	(1)
2007	Spartak Ivano-Frankivsk	3	(0)
2007	Ivan Odesa	2	(1)
2007	Mykolaiv	16	(1)
2008–2009	Desna Chernihiv	51	(0)
2010–2011	Helios Kharkiv	35	(0)
2011–2013	Naftovyk-Ukrnafta Okhtyrka	42	(0)
2013–2016	Vinnytsia	46	(5)
- * Club domestic league appearances and goals as of 25 December 2021

Dmytro Oleksandrovych Yevstafiyev (Ukrainian: Дмитро Олександрович Євстафієв; born 3 January 1985) is a Ukrainian retired footballer.

== Career ==
=== Chornomorets Odesa ===
He began to play for Chornomorets-2 Odesa the second team of the city of Odesa in 2001.

=== Podillya Khmelnytskyi ===
In 2004 he moved to Podillya Khmelnytskyi for two seasons.

=== Spartak Ivano-Frankivsk ===
Then he moved to Spartak Ivano-Frankivsk.

=== Mykolaiv ===
In the summer of 2007 he moved to Mykolaiv.

=== Desna Chernihiv ===
In January 2008 he moved to Desna Chernihiv the main club of the city of Chernihiv until 2009 where he played 51 matches.

=== Helios Kharkiv ===
In the winter transfer window of 2010 he moved to Helios Kharkiv.

=== Naftovyk-Ukrnafta Okhtyrka ===
In the summer of 2011 he moved to Naftovyk-Ukrnafta Okhtyrka for two seasons, playing 42 matches.
