= Oleksandr Bryl =

Ukrainian footballer

Personal information
- Full name: Брыль Александр Александрович
- Date of birth: 19 September 1988 (age 38)
- Place of birth: Ukrainian
- Height: 1.84 m (6 ft 0 in)
- Position: Midfielder

Senior career*
Years	Team	Apps	(Gls)
2005–2008	Metalurh-2 Zaporizhzhia	31	(3)
2009–2011	Feniks-Illichovets Kalinine	29	(0)
2010–2013	Desna Chernihiv	30	(2)
2015–2016	Inhulets Petrove	7	(0)
2015–2018	Tavria-Skif Rozdol	49	(0)
2017–2019	Peremoha Dnipro	24	(4)
- * Club domestic league appearances and goals as of 8 December 2021

Oleksandr Bryl (Ukrainian: Брыль Александр Александрович) is a Ukrainian football player.

== Career ==
Oleksandr Bryl is started his career in 2005 with Metalurh-2 Zaporizhzhia. In 2009 he moved to Feniks-Illichovets Kalinine until 2010 for one season. In 2010 he moved to Desna Chernihiv until 2013, with the club of Chernihiv he won the * Ukrainian Second League in the season 2012–13. In 2015 he moved to Inhulets Petrove. In 2015 he moved to Tavria-Skif Rozdol and in 2017 he moved to Peremoha Dnipro.

== Honours ==
Peremoha Dnipro

- Ukrainian Football Amateur League: 2019–20

Desna Chernihiv

- Ukrainian Second League: 2012–13
