= Oleh Orekhov (footballer, born 1990) =

Ukrainian footballer

Personal information
- Full name: Орехов Олег Олегович
- Date of birth: 28 November 1990 (age 35)
- Place of birth: Mysove, Crimea Oblast, Ukrainian SSR, Soviet Union
- Height: 1.84 m (6 ft 0 in)
- Position: Defender

Senior career*
Years	Team	Apps	(Gls)
2008–2009	Ros Bila Tserkva	2	(0)
2009–2010	Desna Chernihiv	9	(0)
2010–2011	Lviv	3	(0)
2010–2013	Desna Chernihiv	15	(0)
2012–2013	Olimpik Donetsk	2	(0)
2013–2014	Tytan Armiansk	5	(0)
- * Club domestic league appearances and goals as of 8 December 2021

Oleh Orekhov (Ukrainian: Орехов Олег Олегович) is a Ukrainian football player.

== Career ==
Oleh Orekhov is started his career in 2008 with Ros Bila Tserkva. In summer 2009 he moved for one season with Desna Chernihiv, the main club of Chernihiv. In 2010 he moved to Lviv then he returned to Desna Chernihiv until 2013. In 2012 he played also 2 matches for Olimpik Donetsk. In summer 2013 he moved to Tytan Armiansk.

== Honours ==
Desna Chernihiv

- Ukrainian Second League: 2012–13
