= FC Sevastopol-2 =

- Full name: Futbol′nyy klub Sevastopol-2
- Founded: 2008
- Dissolved: 2014
- Ground: Station Kolos
- Capacity: 1,000
- League: Ukrainian Second League

FC Sevastopol-2 was a Ukrainian football club. It is the second squad or Reserve team of FC Sevastopol. The club competed in the Ukrainian Second League football competition of Ukraine for the first time in 2008 but was withdrawn from the competition during the winter break.

Previously the Reserve club FC Sevastopol-2 competed in the Autonomous Republic of Crimea Football League and returned to that competition of 2009.

After the senior club was promoted to the Ukrainian Premier League the club was entered in the Reserves competition for the 2010–11 season.

Upon relegation from the Ukrainian Premier League the club entered the reserve team once again in the Druha Liha for 2011–12 season.

== Honors ==
- Krym Cup (Regional Cup)

2008

== League and cup history (Ukraine) ==
The club was founded in 2004 and played under the name of Alvita. The club competed in the Autonomous Crimean Football League.

Season	Div.	Pos.	Pl.	W	D	L	GS	GA	P	Domestic Cup	Europe	Notes
2008–09	3rd Second League Gr. B	18_{/18}	34	2	4	28	17	39	10			Withdrew
2009–10	Club completes Autonomous Krym Oblast League											
2010–11	1st Reserves; Premier League	16_{/16}	30	9	2	19	36	65	29			Relegated
2011–12	3rd Second League Gr. B	10_{/14}	26	7	3	16	26	51	24			
2012–13	3rd Second League Gr. B	9_{/13}	24	7	2	15	25	44	23			Favbet (relegation) tournament Gr. 4 (5th); withdrew
2013–14	1st Reserves; Premier League	10_{/16}	26	10	3	13	53	61	33			Expelled
