= 2008–09 FC Desna Chernihiv season =

FC Desna Chernihiv
2009–10 season
- President: Pavlo Klymets, Valeriy Korotkov
- Manager: Pavlo Klymets
- Stadium: Chernihiv Stadium
- Ukrainian First League: 8th
- Ukrainian Cup: Round of 64 (1/32)
- Top goalscorer: League: Ruslan Zeynalov (6); All: Ruslan Zeynalov (6)
Home colours	Away colours

For the 2008–09 season, FC Desna Chernihiv competed in the Ukrainian First League.

== Transfers ==
=== In ===
Date	Pos.	Player	Age	Moving from	Type	Fee	Source
Summer
15 July 2008	GK	(Ukraine) Andriy Fedorenko	38	(Romania) Ceahlăul Piatra Neamț	Transfer	Free	
15 July 2008	GK	(Ukraine) Viktor Litvin	20	(Ukraine) Feniks-Illichovets Kalinine	Loan Return	Free	
15 July 2008	FW	(Ukraine) Andriy Pisnyi	38	(Ukraine) Illichivets Mariupol	Transfer	Free	
15 July 2008	FW	(Ukraine) Ruslan Ivashko	38	(Ukraine) Zakarpattia Uzhhorod	Transfer	Free	
15 July 2008	FW	(Ukraine) Artem Mostovyi	38	(Ukraine) FC Lviv	Transfer	Free	
15 July 2008	DF	(Ukraine) Yevheniy Pichkur	38	(Ukraine) Krymteplytsia	Transfer	Free	
15 July 2008	DF	(Ukraine) Maksym Stoyan	38	(Ukraine) Dnipro Cherkasy	Transfer	Free	
15 July 2008	DF	(Guinea) Mamadi Sangare	38	(Moldova) Nistru Otaci	Transfer	Free	
15 July 2008	DF	(Ukraine) Denys Stoyan	38	(Ukraine) Tavriya Simferopol	Transfer	Free	
15 July 2008	MF	(Ukraine) Oleh Mazurenko	38	(Ukraine) Illichivets-2 Mariupol	Transfer	Free	
15 July 2008	FW	(Ukraine) Vitaliy Bulenok	38	(Ukraine) Desna-2 Chernihiv	Transfer	Free	
Winter
22 January 2009	DF	(Ukraine) Yuriy Maksimenko	24	(Ukraine) Bukovyna Chernivtsi	Transfer	Free	
22 January 2009	FW	(Ukraine) Volodymyr Kilikevych	24	(Finland) Tornion Pallo -47	Transfer	Free	
22 January 2009	FW	(Ukraine) Vyacheslav Sharpar	24	(Ukraine) Naftovyk-Ukrnafta Okhtyrka	Transfer	Free	

=== Out ===
Date	Pos.	Player	Age	Moving to	Type	Fee	Source
Summer
20 June 2008	DF	(Ukraine) Ruslan Ermolenkov	24	(Ukraine) Dnister Ovidiopol	Transfer	Free	
20 June 2008	DF	(Ukraine) Oleh Davydov	24	(Ukraine) Desna-2 Chernihiv	Transfer	Free	
15 June 2008	MF	(Ukraine) Ihor Pokarynin	38	(Ukraine) Desna-2 Chernihiv	Transfer	Free	
20 June 2008	FW	(Ukraine) Volodymyr Postolatyev	24	(Ukraine) Oleksandria	Transfer	Free	
20 June 2008	MF	(Ukraine) Anatoliy Matkevych	24	(Ukraine) Komunalnyk Luhansk	Transfer	Free	
15 June 2008	MF	(Ukraine) Yakiv Kripak	20	(Ukraine) Unattached	Transfer	Free	
15 June 2008	MF	(Ukraine) Volodymyr Hapon	38	(Ukraine) FC Volyn Lutsk	Transfer	Free	
15 June 2008	FW	(Ukraine) Ihor Shvets	38	(Ukraine) Oleksandriya	Transfer	Free	
15 June 2008	FW	(Ukraine) Yuriy Slabyshev	38	(Ukraine) Komunalnyk Luhansk	Transfer	Free	
15 June 2008	DF	(Ukraine) Valeriy Chornyi	23	Unattached	Transfer	Free	
Winter
15 July 2009	GK	(Ukraine) Viktor Litvin	20	(Ukraine) Desna-2 Chernihiv	Loan Return	Free	
15 July 2009	DF	(Guinea) Mamadi Sangare	38	(Kazakhstan) Atyrau	Transfer	Free	
15 January 2009	MF	(Ukraine) Oleksandr Babor	20	(Ukraine) Mykolaiv	Transfer	Free	
15 January 2009	MF	(Ukraine) Yuriy Komyahin	38	(Ukraine) Desna-2 Chernihiv	Transfer	Free	
15 July 2008	FW	(Ukraine) Vitaliy Bulenok	38	(Ukraine) Desna-2 Chernihiv	Transfer	Free	
15 January 2009	FW	(Ukraine) Andriy Pisnyi	38	(Ukraine) Feniks-Illichovets Kalinine	Transfer	Free	
15 January 2009	DF	(Ukraine) Maksym Stoyan	38	(Ukraine) MFC Mykolaiv	Transfer	Free	
15 January 2009	DF	(Ukraine) Denys Stoyan	38	(Kazakhstan) FC Kaisar	Transfer	Free	
15 January 2009	MF	(Ukraine) Oleh Mazurenko	38	(Ukraine) Obolon Kyiv	Transfer	Free	

== Statistics ==
=== Appearances and goals ===
No.	Pos	Nat	Player	Total		Premier League		Cup	
No.	Pos	Nat	Player	Apps	Goals	Apps	Goals	Apps	Goals
Goalkeepers
	GK	(Ukraine) UKR	Yuriy Nikitenko	3	0	3	0	0	0
	GK	(Ukraine) UKR	Andriy Fedorenko	24	0	24	0	0	0
	GK	(Ukraine) UKR	Ihor Vitiv	1	0	1	0	0	0
	GK	(Ukraine) UKR	Viktor Litvin	0	0	0	0	0	0
Defenders
	DF	(Ukraine) UKR	Tymur Rustamov	22	1	22	1	0	0
	DF	(Ukraine) UKR	Yuriy Maksimenko	1	0	1	0	0	0
	DF	(Guinea) GUI	Mamadi Sangare	18	0	18	0	0	0
	DF	(Ukraine) UKR	Volodymyr Chulanov	24	1	24	1	0	0
	DF	(Ukraine) UKR	Maksym Stoyan	10	0	10	0	0	0
	DF	(Ukraine) UKR	Denys Stoyan	10	0	10	0	0	0
Midfielders
	MF	(Ukraine) UKR	Serhiy Kucherenko	18	4	18	4	0	0
	MF	(Ukraine) UKR	Yevheniy Pichkur	13	2	13	2	0	0
	MF	(Ukraine) UKR	Serhiy Starenkyi	26	1	26	1	0	0
	MF	(Ukraine) UKR	Pavlo Shchedrakov	24	0	24	0	0	0
	MF	(Ukraine) UKR	Ruslan Zeynalov	13	6	13	6	0	0
	MF	(Ukraine) UKR	Mykhaylo Hurka	0	0	0	0	0	0
	MF	(Ukraine) UKR	Dmytro Evstafiev	25	0	25	0	0	0
	MF	(Ukraine) UKR	Oleh Mazurenko	9	2	9	2	0	0
	MF	(Ukraine) UKR	Yuriy Komyahin	4	0	4	0	0	0
	MF	(Ukraine) UKR	Oleksandr Babor	13	2	13	2	0	0
Forwards
	FW	(Ukraine) UKR	Oleksandr Hrebieniuk	29	4	29	4	0	0
	FW	(Ukraine) UKR	Oleksandr Kozhemyachenko	2	0	2	0	0	0
	FW	(Ukraine) UKR	Petro Kondratyuk	12	0	12	0	0	0
	FW	(Ukraine) UKR	Andriy Pisnyi	2	0	2	0	0	0
	FW	(Ukraine) UKR	Vyacheslav Sharpar	12	2	12	2	0	0
	FW	(Ukraine) UKR	Volodymyr Kilikevych	6	1	6	1	0	0
	FW	(Ukraine) UKR	Vitaliy Bulenok	5	0	5	0	0	0
	FW	(Ukraine) UKR	Ruslan Ivashko	4	0	4	0	0	0
	FW	(Ukraine) UKR	Artem Mostovyi	11	0	11	0	0	0

Source: Competitions

Last updated: 31 May 2019

=== Goalscorers ===
Rank	No.	Pos	Nat	Name	Premier League	Cup	Europa League	Total
1		MF	(Ukraine)	Ruslan Zeynalov	6	0	0	6
2		DF	(Ukraine)	Serhiy Kucherenko	4	0	0	4
2		FW	(Ukraine)	Oleksandr Hrebieniuk	4	0	0	4
3		MF	(Ukraine)	Yevheniy Pichkur	2	0	0	2
3		MF	(Ukraine)	Oleh Mazurenko	2	0	0	2
3		FW	(Ukraine)	Vyacheslav Sharpar	2	0	0	2
3		MF	(Ukraine)	Oleksandr Babor	2	0	0	2
5		DF	(Ukraine)	Tymur Rustamov	1	0	0	1
5		DF	(Ukraine)	Volodymyr Chulanov	1	0	0	1
5		MF	(Ukraine)	Serhiy Starenkyi	1	0	0	1
5		FW	(Ukraine)	Volodymyr Kilikevych	1	0	0	1
				Total	26	0	0	26

Last updated: 31 May 2019
