= 2007–08 FC Desna Chernihiv season =

FC Desna Chernihiv
2007–08 season
- President: Oleksiy Savchenko and Pavlo Klymets
- Manager: Serhiy Kucherenko
- Stadium: Chernihiv Stadium
- Ukrainian First League: 4th
- Ukrainian Cup: Round of 16 (1/8)
- Top goalscorer: League: Volodymyr Postolatyev (10); All: Volodymyr Postolatyev (10)
Home colours	Away colours

For the 2007–08 season, FC Desna Chernihiv competed in the Ukrainian First League.

== Transfers ==
=== In ===
Date	Pos.	Player	Age	Moving from	Type	Fee	Source
Summer
15 July 2007	GK	(Ukraine) Yuriy Nikitenko	38	(Ukraine) Spartak Ivano-Frankivsk	Transfer	Free	
15 July 2007	DF	(Ukraine) Valeriy Sokolenko	38	(Poland) Górnik Łęczna	Transfer	Free	
15 July 2007	MF	(Ukraine) Serhiy Rozhok	38	(Ukraine) CSKA Kyiv	Transfer	Free	
15 July 2007	DF	(Guinea) Mamadi Sangare	38	(Moldova) Nistru Otaci	Transfer	Free	
15 July 2007	MF	(Ukraine) Ihor Bobovych	38	(Belarus) Smorgon	Transfer	Free	
15 July 2007	MF	(Ukraine) Serhiy Kucherenko	38	(Ukraine) Spartak Ivano-Frankivsk	Transfer	Free	
15 July 2007	MF	(Ukraine) Serhiy Starenkyi	38	(Belarus) Smorgon	Transfer	Free	
15 July 2007	MF	(Ukraine) Anatoliy Matkevych	38	(Syria) Al-Ittihad	Transfer	Free	
15 July 2007	FW	(Ukraine) Volodymyr Postolatyev	38	(Ukraine) Spartak Ivano-Frankivsk	Transfer	Free	
Winter
15 January 2008	MF	(Ukraine) Volodymyr Hapon	38	(Ukraine) FC Naftovyk-Ukrnafta Okhtyrka	Transfer	Free	
15 January 2008	MF	(Ukraine) Ihor Pokarynin	38	(Latvia) FK Ventspils	Transfer	Free	
15 January 2008	MF	(Ukraine) Yuriy Komyahin	38	(Ukraine) Hirnyk-Sport Komsomolsk	Transfer	Free	
15 January 2008	FW	(Ukraine) Ihor Shvets	38	(Ukraine) Vorskla Poltava	Transfer	Free	
15 January 2008	MF	(Ukraine) Dmytro Evstafiev	38	(Ukraine) Mykolaiv	Transfer	Free	
15 January 2008	FW	(Ukraine) Yuriy Slabyshev	38	(Ukraine) Enerhetyk Burshtyn	Transfer	Free	
15 January 2008	DF	(Ukraine) Oleh Davydov	38	(Ukraine) Naftovyk Okhtyrka	Transfer	Free	
15 January 2008	DF	(Ukraine) Valeriy Chornyi	22	(Ukraine) Arsenal Bila Tserkva	Transfer	Free	

=== Out ===
Date	Pos.	Player	Age	Moving to	Type	Fee	Source
Summer
20 June 2007	GK	(Ukraine) Artem Koleda	24	(Ukraine) Hirnyk-Sport Horishni Plavni	Transfer	Free	
20 June 2007	DF	(Ukraine) Maksym Stankevych	24	(Ukraine) Knyazha Shchaslyve	Transfer	Free	
20 June 2007	MF	(Ukraine) Ivan Bohatyr	24	Unattached	Transfer	Free	
20 June 2007	FW	(Ukraine) Dmytro Kolodin	24	(Belarus) Smorgon	Transfer	Free	
20 June 2007	FW	(Ukraine) Vadym Antipov	20	(Ukraine) Naftovyk-Ukrnafta Okhtyrka	Transfer	Free	
20 June 2007	DF	(Ukraine) Oleksandr Polunytskiy	20	(Ukraine) Stal Alchevsk	Transfer	Free	
15 June 2007	MF	(Ukraine) Ihor Myhalatiuk	20	(Ukraine) Enerhetyk Burshtyn	Transfer	Free	
Winter
15 January 2008	GK	(Ukraine) Viktor Litvin	20	(Ukraine) Feniks-Illichivec(Kalinino)	Loan Return	Free	
15 January 2008	DF	(Ukraine) Maksym Stoyan	38	(Ukraine) MFC Mykolaiv	Transfer	Free	
15 January 2008	MF	(Ukraine) Valentyn Krukovets	38	(Ukraine) Polessia Dobryanka	Transfer	Free	
15 January 2008	FW	(Guinea) Mamadi Sangare	38	(Moldova) Nistru Otaci	Transfer	Free	

== Statistics ==
=== Appearances and goals ===
No.	Pos	Nat	Player	Total		Ukrainian First League		Ukrainian Cup	
No.	Pos	Nat	Player	Apps	Goals	Apps	Goals	Apps	Goals
Goalkeepers
	GK	(Ukraine) UKR	Yuriy Ovcharov	0	0	0	0	0	0
	GK	(Ukraine) UKR	Yuriy Nikitenko	32	0	32	0	0	0
	GK	(Ukraine) UKR	Viktor Litvin	4	0	4	0	0	0
Defenders
	DF	(Ukraine) UKR	Valeriy Sokolenko	11	1	11	1	0	0
	DF	(Ukraine) UKR	Volodymyr Chulanov	35	1	35	1	0	0
	DF	(Ukraine) UKR	Serhiy Rozhok	2	0	2	0	0	0
	DF	(Guinea) GUI	Mamadi Sangare	14	1	14	1	0	0
	DF	(Ukraine) UKR	Tymur Rustamov	33	2	33	2	0	0
	DF	(Ukraine) UKR	Oleh Davydov	6	1	6	1	0	0
	DF	(Ukraine) UKR	Valeriy Chornyi	16	0	14	0	2	0
Midfielders
	MF	(Ukraine) UKR	Valentyn Krukovets	19	3	19	3	0	0
	MF	(Ukraine) UKR	Ihor Bobovych	3	0	3	0	0	0
	MF	(Ukraine) UKR	Serhiy Kucherenko	38	9	38	9	0	0
	MF	(Ukraine) UKR	Yuriy Komyahin	9	1	9	1	0	0
	MF	(Ukraine) UKR	Dmytro Kolodin	17	4	17	4	0	0
	MF	(Ukraine) UKR	Serhiy Starenkyi	15	3	15	3	0	0
	MF	(Ukraine) UKR	Pavlo Shchedrakov	34	2	34	2	0	0
	MF	(Ukraine) UKR	Dmytro Evstafiev	11	0	11	0	0	0
	MF	(Ukraine) UKR	Volodymyr Hapon	6	1	6	1	0	0
	MF	(Ukraine) UKR	Anatoliy Matkevych	3	0	3	0	0	0
	MF	(Ukraine) UKR	Ihor Pokarynin	9	0	9	0	0	0
	MF	(Ukraine) UKR	Oleksandr Babor	23	1	23	1	0	0
Forwards
	FW	(Ukraine) UKR	Oleksandr Kozhemyachenko	19	5	19	5	0	0
	FW	(Ukraine) UKR	Volodymyr Postolatyev	25	10	25	10	0	0
	FW	(Ukraine) UKR	Ruslan Ermolenkov	16	1	16	1	0	0
	FW	(Ukraine) UKR	Ihor Shvets	17	2	17	2	0	0
	FW	(Ukraine) UKR	Yuriy Slabyshev	13	1	13	1	0	0

Source: Competitions

Last updated: 31 May 2019

=== Goalscorers ===
Rank	No.	Pos	Nat	Name	Premier League	Cup	Europa League	Total
1		FW	(Ukraine)	Volodymyr Postolatyev	10	0	0	10
2		MF	(Ukraine)	Serhiy Kucherenko	9	0	0	9
3		FW	(Ukraine)	Oleksandr Kozhemyachenko	5	0	0	5
4		MF	(Ukraine)	Dmytro Kolodin	4	0	0	4
5		MF	(Ukraine)	Serhiy Starenkyi	3	0	0	3
5		MF	(Ukraine)	Valentyn Krukovets	3	0	0	3
6		DF	(Ukraine)	Tymur Rustamov	2	0	0	2
6		MF	(Ukraine)	Pavlo Shchedrakov	2	0	0	2
6		FW	(Ukraine)	Ihor Shvets	2	0	0	2
7		DF	(Ukraine)	Valeriy Sokolenko	1	0	0	1
7		DF	(Ukraine)	Volodymyr Chulanov	1	0	0	1
7		DF	(Guinea)	Mamadi Sangare	1	0	0	1
7		DF	(Ukraine)	Oleh Davydov	1	0	0	1
7		MF	(Ukraine)	Yuriy Komyahin	1	0	0	1
7		MF	(Ukraine)	Volodymyr Hapon	1	0	0	1
7		FW	(Ukraine)	Ruslan Ermolenkov	1	0	0	1
7		FW	(Ukraine)	Yuriy Slabyshev	1	0	0	1
7		MF	(Ukraine)	Oleksandr Babor	1	0	0	1
				Total	48	0	0	48

Last updated: 31 May 2019
