= 1996 UEFA European Under-16 Championship squads =

Below are the rosters for the UEFA European Under-16 Football Championship 1996 tournament in Austria.

== Group A ==
=== Austria ===
Head coach:

No.	Pos.	Player	Date of birth (age)	Caps	Goals	Club
1	GK	Helge Payer	9 August 1979 (aged 16)			(Austria) SK Rapid Wien
2	MF	Yüksel Sariyar	1 August 1979 (aged 16)			FK Austria Wien
3	DF	Ferdinand Feldhofer	23 October 1979 (aged 16)			(Austria) TSV Pöllau
4	MF	Kai Schoppitsch	2 May 1980 (aged 15)			(Austria) FC Kärnten
5	DF	Martin Stranzl	16 June 1980 (aged 15)			(Austria) SV Güssing
6	DF	Božo Kovačević	24 December 1979 (aged 16)			FK Austria Wien
7	FW	Gerald Hack	1 November 1979 (aged 16)			(Austria) TSV Pöllau
8	MF	Christoph Mamoser	5 August 1979 (aged 16)			(Austria) FC Salzburg
9	MF	Volkan Kahraman	10 October 1979 (aged 16)			(Netherlands) Feyenoord
10	DF	Markus Briza	8 December 1979 (aged 16)			(Austria) SK Rapid Wien
11	MF	Manfred Weingartmann	7 December 1979 (aged 16)			(Austria) FC Admira Wacker
13	FW	Stefan Egger	8 December 1979 (aged 16)			(Germany) Bayern Munich
14	MF	Khajik Jerjes	20 December 1979 (aged 16)			(Austria) SK Rapid Wien
15	MF	Bernd Winkler	13 August 1979 (aged 16)			(Austria) FC Salzburg
16	MF	Daniel Prtenjaca	3 December 1979 (aged 16)			(Austria) FC Admira Wacker
21	GK	Jürgen Rotschnig	30 August 1979 (aged 16)			(Austria) FC Kärnten

=== Poland ===
Head coach: Edward Klejndinst

No.	Pos.	Player	Date of birth (age)	Caps	Goals	Club
1	GK	Rafał Skórski	5 October 1979 (aged 16)			(Poland) Hutnik Kraków
2	DF	Tomasz Owczarek	7 June 1980 (aged 15)			(Poland) GKS Katowice
3	MF	Jarosław Mazurkiewicz	13 November 1979 (aged 16)			(Poland) Wisła Tczew
4	DF	Krzysztof Niedźwiedź	27 February 1980 (aged 16)			(Poland) Hutnik Kraków
5	DF	Krzysztof Smoliński	28 August 1979 (aged 16)			(Poland) Moto Jelcz Oława
6	MF	Kacper Derczyński	1 March 1980 (aged 16)			(Poland) ŁKS Łódź
7	FW	Piotr Chmielewski	11 April 1980 (aged 16)			(Poland) Vratislavia Wrocław
8	MF	Mateusz Bartczak	15 August 1979 (aged 16)			(Poland) Miedź Legnica
9	FW	Mariusz Muszalik	23 September 1979 (aged 16)			(Poland) GKS Katowice
10	MF	Andrzej Polewczak	4 August 1979 (aged 16)			(Poland) Śląsk Wrocław
11	FW	Adam Rostowski	29 February 1980 (aged 16)			(Poland) Górnik Zabrze
12	GK	Waldemar Piątek	2 November 1979 (aged 16)			(Poland) Wisłoka Dębica
13	DF	Marcin Maćkowiak	26 August 1979 (aged 16)			(Poland) ŁKS Łódź
14	MF	Mateusz Olszowiec	8 August 1979 (aged 16)			(Poland) Lech Poznań
17	FW	Wojciech Fabianowski	20 April 1980 (aged 16)			(Poland) Stal Stalowa Wola
	FW	Marek Iwanicki	23 November 1979 (aged 16)			(Poland) Hutnik Warszawa
	FW	Łukasz Rewers	8 May 1980 (aged 15)			(Poland) Lech Poznań
	DF	Tomasz Gajowy	2 September 1979 (aged 16)			(Poland) Warta Poznań
	DF	Michał Smyka	2 September 1979 (aged 16)			(Poland) GKS Katowice

=== Portugal ===
Head coach:

No.	Pos.	Player	Date of birth (age)	Caps	Goals	Club
1	GK	Sérgio Leite	16 August 1979 (aged 16)			(Portugal) Boavista F.C.
2	MF	Joca	28 August 1979 (aged 16)			(Portugal) FC Porto
3	DF	Fredy	14 August 1979 (aged 16)			(Portugal) FC Porto
4	DF	João Flores	21 October 1979 (aged 16)			(Portugal) S.L. Benfica
5	DF	Nuno Gomes	6 December 1979 (aged 16)			(Portugal) Boavista F.C.
6	MF	Hugo Leal	21 May 1980 (aged 15)			(Portugal) S.L. Benfica
7	MF	Ednilson	25 September 1982 (aged 13)			(Portugal) Boavista F.C.
8	DF	Celso Lopes	23 September 1979 (aged 16)			(Portugal) FC Porto
9	FW	Paulo Costa	5 December 1979 (aged 16)			(Portugal) Odivelas F.C.
10	FW	Simão Sabrosa	31 October 1979 (aged 16)			Sporting Clube de Portugal
11	FW	Petit	28 December 1981 (aged 14)			(Portugal) Boavista F.C.
12	GK	Hugo Calha	13 September 1979 (aged 16)			Sporting Clube de Portugal
13	DF	Ricardo Esteves	16 September 1979 (aged 16)			(Portugal) S.L. Benfica
14	DF	Sérgio Morujo	9 September 1979 (aged 16)			Sporting Clube de Portugal
15	MF	Hugo Cruz	5 April 1980 (aged 16)			(Portugal) FC Porto
16	MF	Edgar Caseiro	20 July 1980 (aged 15)			(Portugal) S.L. Benfica

=== Republic of Ireland ===
Head coach:

No.	Pos.	Player	Date of birth (age)	Caps	Goals	Club
1	GK	Niall Hobbart	4 September 1979 (aged 16)			(Republic of Ireland) Tralee Dynamos
2	DF	David Billington	15 January 1980 (aged 16)			(England) Peterborough United F.C.
3	DF	Clive Clarke	14 January 1980 (aged 16)			(England) Stoke City F.C.
4	DF	Timothy McGrath	16 August 1979 (aged 16)			(Scotland) Celtic F.C.
5	DF	Richard Dunne	21 September 1979 (aged 16)			(England) Everton F.C.
6	DF	Jason Gavin	14 March 1980 (aged 16)			(Republic of Ireland) Crumlin United F.C.
7	MF	Gerard Crossley	2 May 1980 (aged 15)			(Scotland) Celtic F.C.
8	MF	Stephen McPhail	9 December 1979 (aged 16)			(England) Leeds United F.C.
9	FW	Niall Byrne	3 September 1979 (aged 16)			(England) Liverpool
10	FW	Robbie Keane	8 July 1980 (aged 15)			(England) Wolverhampton Wanderers F.C.
11	FW	David Freeman	25 November 1979 (aged 16)			(Republic of Ireland) Cherry Orchard F.C.
12	MF	Richie Partridge	12 September 1980 (aged 15)			(Republic of Ireland) Stella Maris F.C.
13	DF	Paul Donnolly	31 August 1979 (aged 16)			(Republic of Ireland) Home Farm F.C.
14	MF	Sean Mannion	3 March 1980 (aged 16)			(Republic of Ireland) Stella Maris F.C.
15	MF	Christopher Winters	28 August 1979 (aged 16)			(Republic of Ireland) Stella Maris F.C.
16	GK	John Murphy	23 September 1979 (aged 16)			

== Group B ==
=== Germany ===
Head coach:

No.	Pos.	Player	Date of birth (age)	Caps	Goals	Club
	GK	Thomas Hillenbrand	10 October 1979 (aged 16)			(Germany) Karlsruher SC
	GK	Morris Kaczmarek	16 August 1979 (aged 16)			(Germany) FC Konstanz
	DF	Oliver Beer	14 September 1979 (aged 16)			(Germany) Bayern Munich
	DF	Philipp Bönig	20 March 1980 (aged 16)			(Germany) Bayern Munich
	DF	Gregor Kapitza	9 August 1979 (aged 16)			(Germany) 1. FC Köln
	DF	Norman Loose	10 January 1980 (aged 16)			(Germany) FC Rot-Weiß Erfurt
	MF	Carsten Sträßer	5 July 1980 (aged 15)			(Germany) FC Carl Zeiss Jena
	MF	Jens Truckenbrod	18 February 1980 (aged 16)			(Germany) Borussia Mönchengladbach
	MF	Markus Goller	19 February 1980 (aged 16)			(Germany) 1. FC Nürnberg
	MF	Jochen Endres	14 August 1979 (aged 16)			(Germany) Eintracht Frankfurt
	MF	Alexander Hauschild	17 March 1980 (aged 16)			(Germany) Chemnitzer FC
	MF	Alexander Nouri	20 August 1979 (aged 16)			(Germany) SV Werder Bremen
	MF	Tobias Schäper	24 October 1979 (aged 16)			(Germany) Borussia Dortmund
	FW	Patrick Falk	8 February 1980 (aged 16)			(Germany) Eintracht Frankfurt
	FW	Andreas Gensler	13 August 1979 (aged 16)			(Germany) Bayer 04 Leverkusen
	FW	Jan Zimmermann	5 October 1979 (aged 16)			(Germany) TSV Havelse

=== Greece ===
Head coach:

=== Romania ===
Head coach:

=== Ukraine ===
Head coach: (Ukraine) Valentyn Lutsenko

No.	Pos.	Player	Date of birth (age)	Caps	Goals	Club
	GK	Kyrylo Suslov	23 November 1979 (aged 16)			(Ukraine) Shakhtar Donetsk
	GK	Anatoliy Zhabchenko	23 February 1979 (aged 17)			(Ukraine) Dynamo Saky
	DF	Vitaliy Zadoyenko	6 August 1979 (aged 16)			(Russia) Rotor Volgograd
	DF	Vitaliy Rozghon	23 March 1980 (aged 16)			(Ukraine) Podillia Khmelnytskyi
	DF	Oleksandr Pustovit	11 March 1980 (aged 16)			(Ukraine) Dynamo Kyiv
	DF	Oleksandr Dmytruk	16 July 1980 (aged 15)			
	DF	Serhiy Matyukhin	21 March 1980 (aged 16)			(Ukraine) DVUFK Dnipropetrovsk
	MF	Yevhen Lutsenko	10 November 1980 (aged 15)			(Belgium) R.S.C. Anderlecht
	MF	Yuriy Danchenko	9 August 1979 (aged 16)			(Ukraine) Shakhtar Donetsk
	MF	Serhiy Mordas	24 August 1979 (aged 16)			
	MF	Yuriy Voytovych	24 August 1979 (aged 16)			(Ukraine) Karpaty Lviv
	MF	Andriy Pisnyi	20 September 1980 (aged 15)			(Ukraine) DVUFK Dnipropetrovsk
	MF	Armen Akopyan	15 January 1980 (aged 16)			(Ukraine) Metalurh Zaporizhia
	FW	Oleksandr Skoretskyi	3 September 1979 (aged 16)			
	FW	Yuriy Slabyshev	6 October 1979 (aged 16)			(Ukraine) Torpedo Zaporizhia
	FW	Roman Butenko	30 March 1980 (aged 16)			(Ukraine) Shakhtar Donetsk

== Group C ==
=== Croatia ===
Head coach: (Croatia) Martin Novoselac

No.	Pos.	Player	Date of birth (age)	Caps	Goals	Club
1	GK	Medo Sušić	26 September 1979 (aged 16)			
2	DF	Edo Vulić	7 December 1979 (aged 16)			
3	DF	Kristijan Polovanec	10 October 1979 (aged 16)			(Croatia) GNK Dinamo Zagreb
4	MF	Jurica Vranješ	31 January 1980 (aged 16)			(Croatia) NK Osijek
5	DF	Branko Banović	18 August 1979 (aged 16)			
6	DF	Goran Sablić	8 October 1979 (aged 16)			(Croatia) HNK Hajduk Split
7	MF	Tonći Pirija	13 March 1980 (aged 16)			(Croatia) HNK Hajduk Split
8	FW	Tomislav Gondžić	30 April 1980 (aged 15)			(Croatia) NK Inter Zaprešić
9	FW	Dražen Horvat	27 October 1979 (aged 16)			
10	MF	Stjepan Jukić	27 October 1979 (aged 16)			(Croatia) NK Osijek
11	FW	Zvonimir Deranja	22 November 1979 (aged 16)			(Croatia) HNK Hajduk Split
12	GK	Ivan Turina	3 October 1980 (aged 15)			(Croatia) GNK Dinamo Zagreb
13	MF	Vlatko Bukovac	7 November 1979 (aged 16)			
14	MF	Nenad Petrc	7 May 1980 (aged 15)			
15	DF	Jurica Puljiz	13 December 1979 (aged 16)			(Croatia) HNK Hajduk Split
16	FW	Ivica Olić	14 September 1979 (aged 16)			(Croatia) NK Marsonia
17	MF	Tomislav Ciković	11 October 1979 (aged 16)			
18	MF	Srebrenko Posavec	19 March 1980 (aged 16)			(Croatia) NK Varaždin

=== France ===
Head coach:

No.	Pos.	Player	Date of birth (age)	Caps	Goals	Club
1	GK	Sébastien Frey	18 March 1980 (aged 16)			(France) AS Cannes
2	DF	Anthony Réveillère	10 November 1979 (aged 16)			(France) Angers SCO
3	FW	Jean-François Suchet	14 August 1979 (aged 16)			(France) Olympique Lyonnais
4	DF	Samir Beloufa	27 August 1979 (aged 16)			(France) AS Cannes
5	DF	Clément Vigier	10 August 1979 (aged 16)			(France) RC Lens
6	MF	Franck Goudeagbé	30 October 1979 (aged 16)			(France) FC Girondins de Bordeaux
7	DF	David Di Tommaso	6 October 1979 (aged 16)			(France) AS Monaco
8	DF	Frédéric Ribeiro	7 August 1979 (aged 16)			(France) Olympique Lyonnais
9	FW	Roland Vieira	16 August 1979 (aged 16)			(France) Olympique Lyonnais
10	MF	Steed Malbranque	6 January 1980 (aged 16)			(France) Olympique Lyonnais
11	DF	Olivier Bernard	14 October 1979 (aged 16)			(France) Olympique Lyonnais
12	MF	Fabrice Exbrayat	19 August 1980 (aged 15)			(France) Lyon-Duchere
13	DF	Jérémie Bréchet	14 August 1979 (aged 16)			(France) Olympique Lyonnais
14	FW	Guillaume Sabourin	25 September 1979 (aged 16)			(France) AS Saint-Étienne
15	DF	Sylvain Marchal	10 February 1980 (aged 16)			(France) FC Metz
16	GK	Rémy Vercoutre	26 June 1980 (aged 15)			(France) Montpellier HSC

=== Spain ===
Head coach: (Spain) Juan Santisteban

No.	Pos.	Player	Date of birth (age)	Caps	Goals	Club
	GK	Daniel Aranzubia	18 September 1979 (aged 16)			(Spain) Athletic Bilbao
	GK	Noel	22 October 1979 (aged 16)			(Spain) Sporting Gijón
	DF	Juan Manuel Abadín Pérez	23 August 1979 (aged 16)			(Spain) Athletic Bilbao
	DF	Juan Andrés Izarra Alica	10 September 1979 (aged 16)			(Spain) Athletic Bilbao
	DF	Jorge Manuel Ruiz Pérez	2 August 1979 (aged 16)			(Spain) Valencia CF
	DF	Jesús Duarte	9 January 1980 (aged 16)			(Spain) Real Sociedad
	DF	Leo Bermejo	24 August 1979 (aged 16)			(Spain) RCD Español
	MF	José Silvano	20 May 1980 (aged 15)			(Spain) RCD Mallorca
	MF	Samuel Baños	16 August 1979 (aged 16)			(Spain) Sporting Gijón
	MF	Fernando Varela	1 September 1979 (aged 16)			(Spain) Real Betis
	MF	Fernando Soriano	24 September 1979 (aged 16)			(Spain) Real Zaragoza
	MF	David Sousa	3 February 1980 (aged 16)			(Spain) Real Madrid
	MF	Mario Rosas	22 May 1980 (aged 15)			(Spain) FC Barcelona
	MF	Jaba	24 September 1979 (aged 16)			(Spain) Athletic Bilbao
	FW	Pablo Couñago	9 August 1979 (aged 16)			(Spain) Celta Vigo
	FW	Marcos Novo	21 April 1980 (aged 16)			(Spain) Valencia CF

=== Switzerland ===
Head coach:

No.	Pos.	Player	Date of birth (age)	Caps	Goals	Club
	GK	Thierry Bally	9 September 1979 (aged 16)			(Switzerland) Genève-Servette HC
	GK	Dino Roselli	31 October 1979 (aged 16)			(Switzerland) FC Aarau
	DF	Ivo Dätwyler	4 October 1979 (aged 16)			(Switzerland) FC Aarau
	DF	Davide Gallotti	23 January 1980 (aged 16)			(Switzerland) FC Locarno
	DF	Marc Hübscher	9 March 1980 (aged 16)			(Switzerland) Lausanne Sports
	DF	Daniel Keel	2 October 1979 (aged 16)			(Switzerland) FC St. Gallen
	DF	Oumar Kondé	19 August 1979 (aged 16)			(Switzerland) FC Basel
	MF	Bruno Chappuis	3 August 1979 (aged 16)			(West Germany) 1. FC Kaiserslautern
	MF	Nicolas Derungs	25 April 1980 (aged 16)			(Switzerland) FC Aarau
	MF	Emanuele Di Zenzo	26 December 1979 (aged 16)			(Switzerland) FC Sion
	MF	Damien Mollard	3 October 1979 (aged 16)			(Switzerland) FC Fribourg
	MF	Andrea Rotanzi	23 April 1980 (aged 16)			(Switzerland) FC Locarno
	MF	Julien Stauffer	13 September 1979 (aged 16)			(Switzerland) Neuchâtel Xamax
	FW	Andreas Bächtold	6 December 1979 (aged 16)			(Switzerland) FC Schaffhausen
	FW	Martin Herren	21 December 1979 (aged 16)			(Switzerland) Young Boys Bern
	FW	Oliver Kaiser	19 December 1979 (aged 16)			(Switzerland) FC Winterthur
	FW	Christophe Schreier	29 September 1979 (aged 16)			(Switzerland) Genève-Servette HC

== Group D ==
=== England ===
Head coach:

No.	Pos.	Player	Date of birth (age)	Caps	Goals	Club
1	GK	Gareth Stewart	3 February 1980 (aged 16)			(England) Blackburn Rovers
2	DF	Richard Cooper	27 September 1979 (aged 16)			(England) Nottingham Forest
3	DF	Michael Ball	2 October 1979 (aged 16)			(England) Everton
4	DF	Steve Haslam	6 September 1979 (aged 16)			(England) Sheffield Wednesday
5	DF	Wes Brown	13 October 1979 (aged 16)			(England) Manchester United
6	MF	Jamie Day	13 September 1979 (aged 16)			(England) Arsenal
7	MF	Alan Quinn	13 June 1979 (aged 16)			(England) Sheffield Wednesday
8	MF	Kenny Lunt	20 November 1979 (aged 16)			(England) Crewe Alexandra
9	FW	Mark Jones	7 September 1979 (aged 16)			(England) Wolverhampton Wanderers
10	FW	Michael Owen	14 December 1979 (aged 16)			(England) Liverpool
11	MF	Darren Way	21 November 1979 (aged 16)			(England) Norwich City
12	MF	Steven Gerrard	30 May 1980 (aged 15)			(England) Liverpool
13	FW	Phil Jevons	1 August 1979 (aged 16)			(England) Everton
14	DF	Nick Fenton	23 November 1979 (aged 16)			(England) Manchester City
15	MF	Lee Marshall	21 January 1979 (aged 17)			(England) Norwich City

=== Israel ===
Head coach:

Omer perez

=== Slovakia ===
Head coach:

=== Turkey ===
Head coach:

No.	Pos.	Player	Date of birth (age)	Caps	Goals	Club
	GK	Ahmet Yilmazer	5 August 1979 (aged 16)			
		Ozgur Sari	7 October 1980 (aged 15)			
	DF	Adem Dursun	26 December 1979 (aged 16)			
	DF	Macit Güven	2 March 1980 (aged 16)			
	MF	Rifat Engiz	15 December 1979 (aged 16)			
		Guvenc Ozkan	5 September 1980 (aged 15)			
	FW	Gökdeniz Karadeniz	11 January 1980 (aged 16)			
	FW	Mesut Kumcuoglu	13 September 1979 (aged 16)			
		Hakan Sen	19 October 1979 (aged 16)			
	MF	Emre Belözoglu	7 September 1980 (aged 15)			
	FW	Berkant Göktan	12 December 1980 (aged 15)			
		Mehmet Olasmis	21 March 1980 (aged 16)			
	MF	Hasan Üçüncü	16 November 1980 (aged 15)			
	DF	Nedim Vatansever	1 September 1979 (aged 16)			
		Ugur Yilmaz	1 August 1979 (aged 16)			
	MF	Abdullah Boz	1 April 1980 (aged 16)			
