= List of FC Desna-2 Chernihiv players =

Football club in Chernihiv, Ukraine

== List of Desna 2 Chernihiv players ==
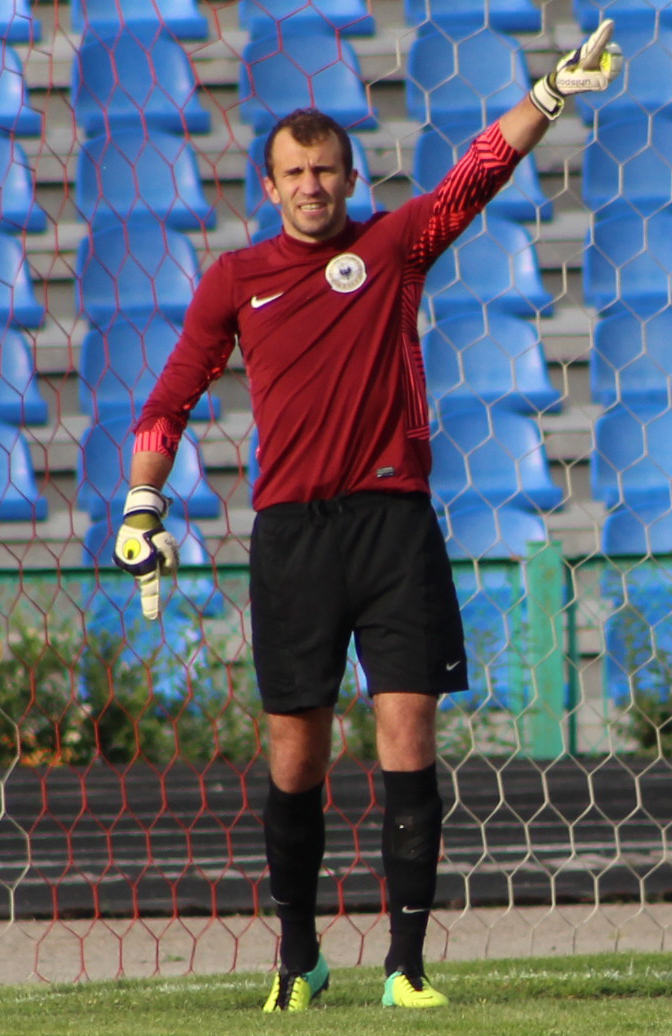
Andriy Fedorenko played for Desna-2 Chernihiv in 2008–2009

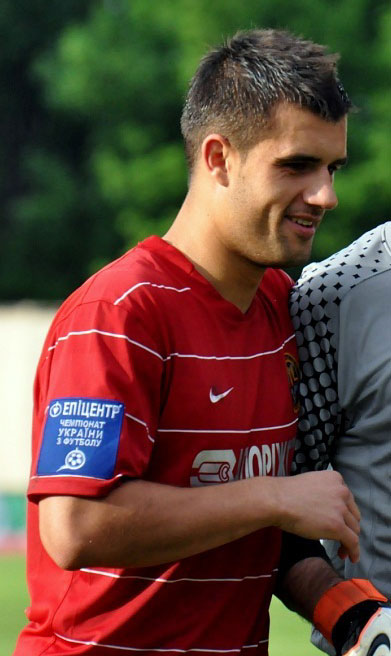
Denys Skepskyi played for Desna-2 Chernihiv in 2003

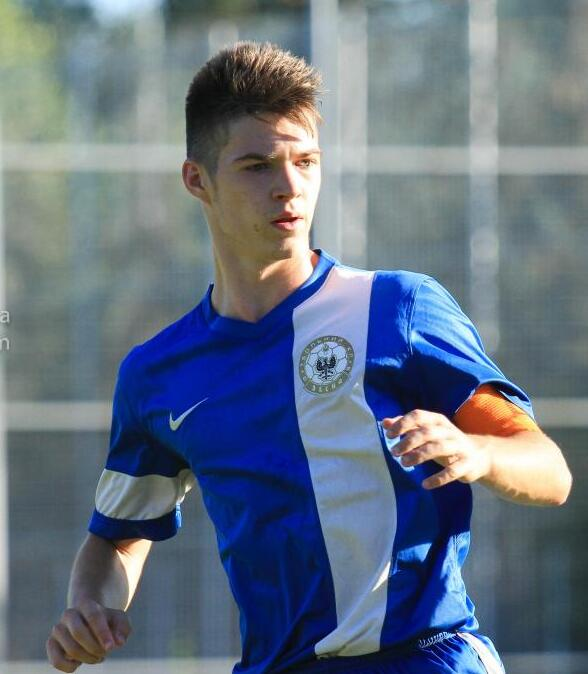
Yevheniy Belych played for Desna-2 Chernihiv in 2018–2019

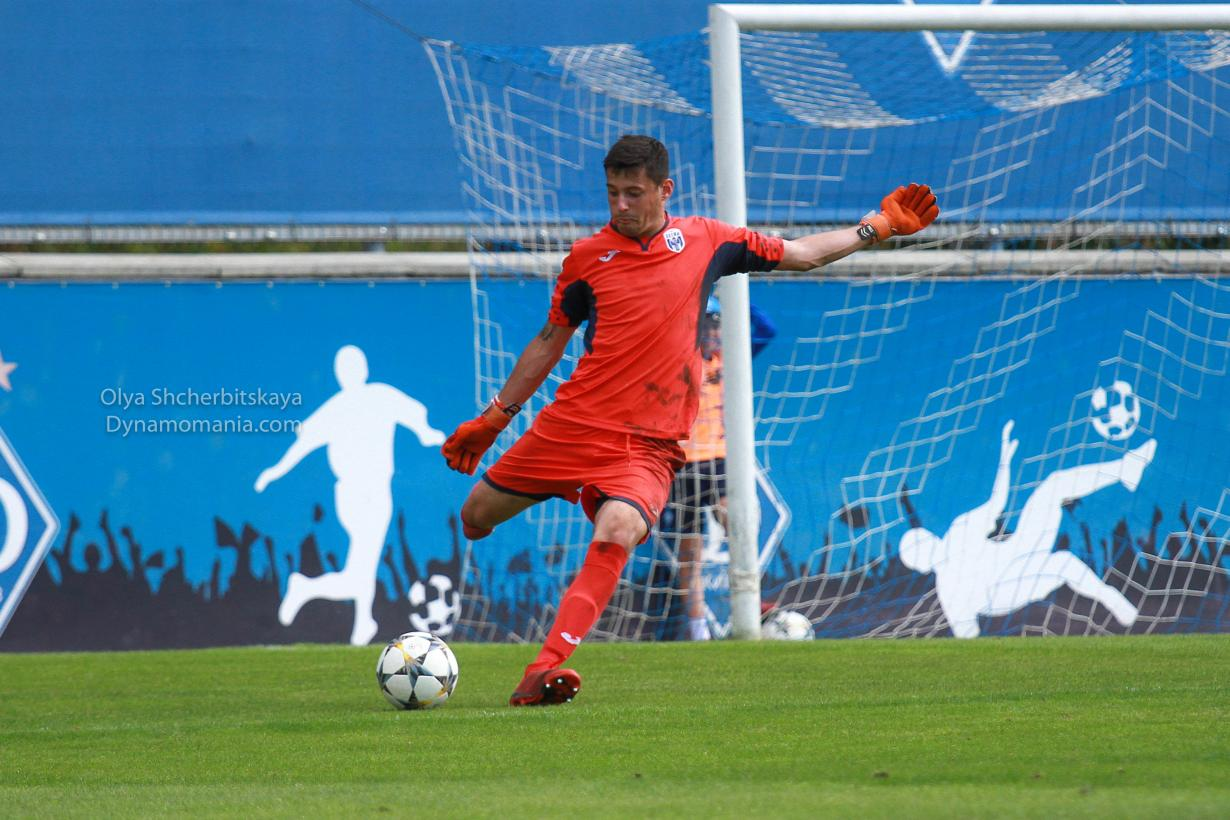
Maksym Tatarenko played for Desna-2 Chernihiv in 2018–2020

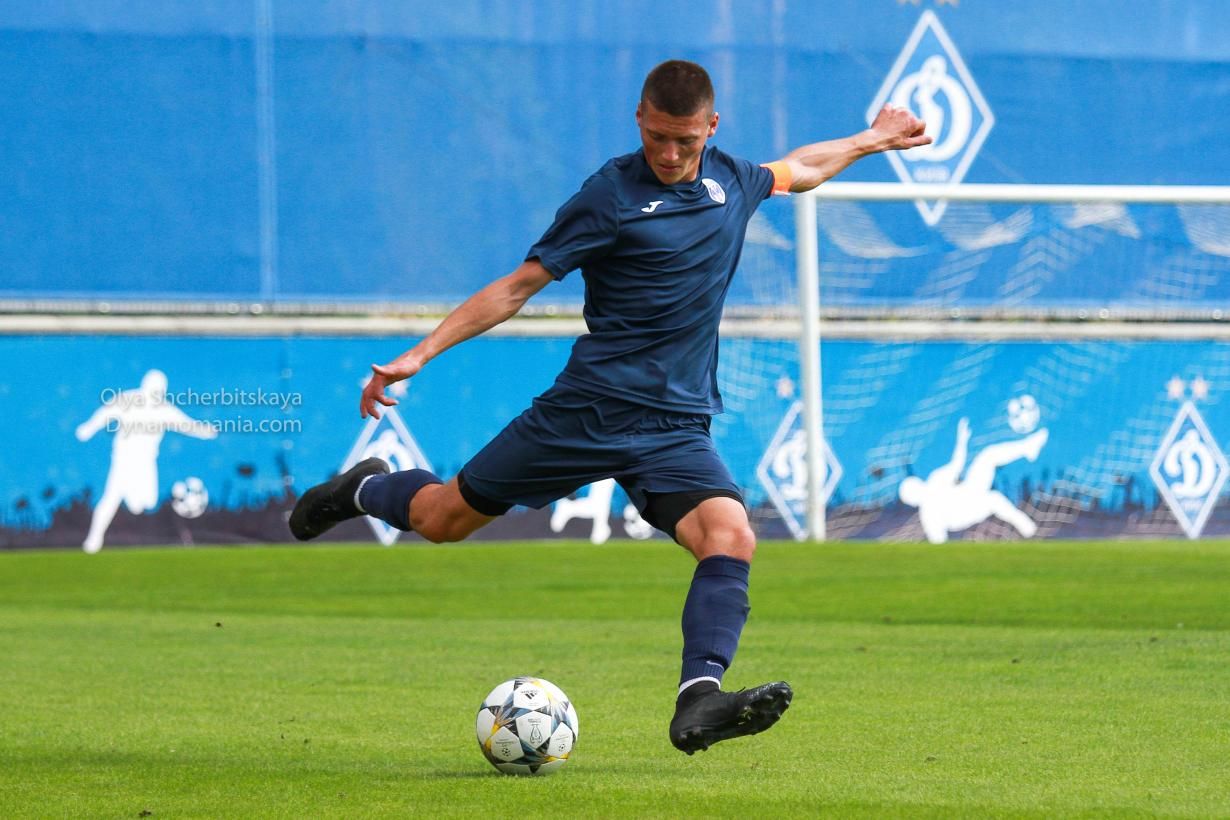
Eduard Halstyan played for Desna-2 Chernihiv in 2016–2018

== Notable players ==
- (Ukraine) Yevheniy Belych
- (Ukraine) Dmytro Sydorenko
- (Ukraine) Maksym Tatarenko
- (Ukraine) Oleksandr Konopko
- (Ukraine) Teymuraz Mchedlishvili
- (Armenia) Eduard Halstyan
- (Ukraine) Andriy Fedorenko
- (Ukraine) Denys Skepskyi
- (Ukraine) Illya Shevtsov
- (Ukraine) Yuriy Komyahin
- (Ukraine) Dmytro Romanenko
- (Ukraine) Tymur Rustamov
- (Ukraine) Ihor Pokarynin
- (Ukraine) Illya Karavashchenko
- (Ukraine) Renat Mochulyak
- (Ukraine) Denys Demyanenko
- (Ukraine) Oleh Davydov
- (Ukraine) Viktor Litvin
- (Ukraine) Vladimir Matsuta
- (Ukraine) Mykola Syrash
