= Ruslan Zeynalov =

Ukrainian footballer (born 1982)

Personal information
- Full name: Ruslan Bakhtiyar oglu Zeynalov
- Date of birth: 19 June 1982 (age 44)
- Place of birth: Voroshilovgrad, Ukrainian SSR
- Height: 1.83 m (6 ft 0 in)
- Position: Midfielder

Youth career
- 1998–2000: LVUFK Luhansk

Senior career*
Years	Team	Apps	(Gls)
2000–2001	Zorya Luhansk	0	(0)
2002–2003	Rīga	22	(3)
2004–2005	Stal Alchevsk	24	(2)
2006–2007	Naftovyk-Ukrnafta Okhtyrka	43	(13)
2008	Krymteplytsia Molodizhne	26	(2)
2009	Desna Chernihiv	13	(6)
2009–2011	Oleksandriya	60	(6)
2012	Krymteplytsia Molodizhne	28	(7)
2013	Belshina Bobruisk	5	(0)
2013–2014	Oleksandriya	21	(4)
2014	Araz Naxçıvan	0	(0)
- * Club domestic league appearances and goals as of 11 October 2014

Ruslan Bakhtiyarovych Zeynalov (Ukrainian: Руслан Бахтіярович Зейналов; born 19 June 1982) is a Ukrainian former professional footballer.

== Career ==
Zeynalov signed for Azerbaijan Premier League team Araz-Naxçıvan in October 2014. He left the club in November without making an appearance, after Araz withdrew from the league.

== Honours ==
Individual

- Desna Chernihiv Player of the Year: 2009
