= Valeriy Korotkov =

Ukrainian politician and entrepreneur (1951–2021)

- Валерій Коротков

Personal details
- Born: Valeriy Korotkov; 28 October 1951 Ukrainian SSR, Soviet Union
- Died: 22 July 2021 (aged 69) Bissau, Guinea-Bissau
- Children: At least 2 kids
- Education: secondary education (unfinished vocational education)
- Profession: Businessman

Valeriy Oleksandrovych Korotkov (Ukrainian: Валерій Олександрович Коротков; 28 October 1951 – 22 July 2021) was a Ukrainian oligarch, businessman and football president for FC Desna Chernihiv and FC Veres Rivne.

== Biography ==
The Korotkov's company "Elixir" produced sweetened water in plastic bags. He was the owner of the football club of the higher league (Vyshcha Liha) "Veres".

Since 2019 - Director of Anglo-Capital LLC, which is engaged in the extraction of minerals for the chemical industry. In 2020 he became a co-owner and director of Soleado LLC, which sells watches and jewelry.

=== Political initiatives ===
During the 1994 Ukrainian presidential election, Korotkov was a candidate's authorized representative of Leonid Kuchma.

In 2002, during the parliamentary elections, he unsuccessfully ran in the top five of the ZUBR bloc (ZUBR is an abbreviation of "For Ukraine, Belarus and Russia" in Ukrainian). Consisting of two parties "For Human Rights" and "Light from the East", it failed to reach a passing threshold of 6% gaining only 0.43% on the party list. Korotkov was a non-partisan candidate in the bloc.

In 2020, he became a candidate for mayor of Rivne, a self-nominated candidate.

=== Sports ===
Valery Korotkov was almost the first rich businessman in Veres Rivne, who is remembered mainly for generously financing the Veres football team in 1993. In two years the club reached the top league and defeated Dynamo Kyiv.

On 9 February 2009, he became president of Desna Chernihiv until May 2009, succeeding Pavlo Klymets.

=== Philanthropy ===
In 1990s, for some time Korotkov financed meals for all high school students in Rivne.

== Death ==
Korotkov died in hotel Lisboa, Bissau from heart attack which may have been influenced by kidney disease. While residing in Conakry, Guinea, Korotkov traveled to Guinea-Bissau for few days where he died.

== See also ==
- FC Desna Chernihiv
