= Oleh Mazurenko =

Ukrainian footballer (born 1977)

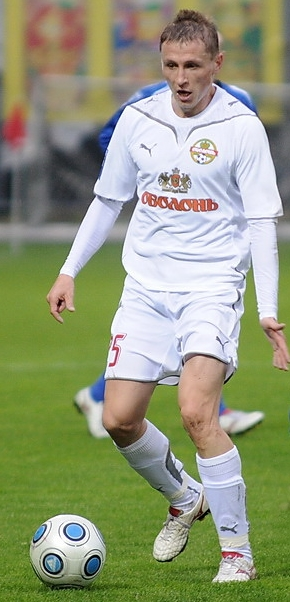

Personal information
- Date of birth: 8 November 1977 (age 48)
- Place of birth: Kyiv, Soviet Union
- Height: 1.78 m (5 ft 10 in)
- Position: Midfielder

Team information
- Current team: Obolon-Brovar Kyiv (manager)

Youth career
- ?–1995: Dynamo Kyiv academy

Senior career*
Years	Team	Apps	(Gls)
1995–1997	Dynamo Kyiv	0	(0)
1995–1997	→ Dynamo-2 Kyiv	40	(1)
1995	→ Dynamo-3 Kyiv	8	(0)
1997	→ Dynamo-3 Kyiv	12	(3)
1998	Energiya Chaykovsky	26	(0)
1999–2000	Volyn Lutsk	20	(2)
2000–2001	Mykolaiv	33	(7)
2001	Zakarpattia-2 Uzhhorod	1	(0)
2002–2004	Obolon Kyiv	43	(3)
2005–2008	Illichivets Mariupol	95	(12)
2008	→ Illichivets-2 Mariupol	5	(1)
2008	Desna Chernihiv	9	(2)
2009–2011	Obolon Kyiv	32	(0)
2012	Bucha		

Managerial career
- 2013–2016: Obolon-Brovar Kyiv (assistant)
- 2016–2017: Obolon-Brovar Kyiv
- 2019: Obolon-Brovar-2 Bucha
- 2020–: Obolon-Brovar Kyiv
- * Club domestic league appearances and goals

Oleh Mazurenko (born 8 November 1977) is a Ukrainian professional football manager and former player.

== Career ==
Mazurenko played for Obolon Kyiv in the Ukrainian Premier League.

He played for Mykolaiv, Illychivets and Obolon before joining Desna in the summer of 2008. He had a trial with Chornomorets in January 2009, but was injured and did not join the club.
