= Yevhen Pichkur =

Ukrainian footballer (born 1985)

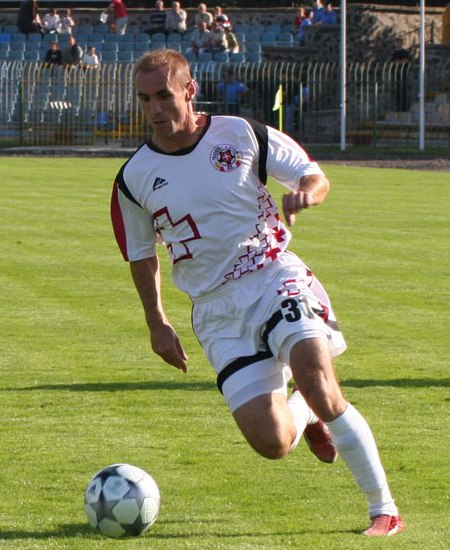

Personal information
- Full name: Yevhen Anatoliyovych Pichkur
- Date of birth: 30 August 1979 (age 47)
- Place of birth: Zhovti Vody, Ukraine SSR, Soviet Union
- Height: 1.85 m (6 ft 1 in)
- Position: Midfielder

Senior career*
Years	Team	Apps	(Gls)
2002	Avanhard Kramatorsk	8	(2)
2003—2004	Enerhiya Yuzhnoukrainsk	12	(0)
2003	Hirnyk Kryvyi Rih	1	(0)
2005-2006	Kremin Kremenchuk	12	(1)
2005-2006	Oleksandriya	4	(0)
2006-2007	Krymteplytsia	40	(2)
2008-2009	Desna Chernihiv	13	(2)
2009-2012	Volyn Lutsk	79	(5)
2012-2013	Vorskla Poltava	3	(0)
2013-2014	Oleksandriya	28	(2)
2013-2014	Helios Kharkiv	7	(1)
2014	Inhulets Petrove	4	(1)
2014	Bucha	2	(0)
2015	Kolos Kovalivka	1	(0)
- * Club domestic league appearances and goals

Yevhen Anatoliyovych Pichkur (Ukrainian: Євген Анатолійович Пічкур; born 18 April 1985) Pichkur is a Ukrainian former professional football player who played as a midfielder.

== Career ==
Pichkur was born in the Ukraine SSR of the Soviet Union. In 2009 he moved from Desna Chernihiv to Volyn Lutsk. In 2012 he moved to Vorskla Poltava In 2013 he moved to Oleksandriya in Ukrainian First League until 2014 where he played 28 matches and scored 2 goals. In 2014 he moved to Inhulets Petrove, where he won the Ukrainian Amateur Cup in 2014.

== Honours ==
Inhulets Petrove

- Ukrainian Football Amateur League: 2014

Volyn Lutsk

- Ukrainian First League: 2013–14

Oleksandriya

- Ukrainian Second League: 2005–06
- Ukrainian First League runner-up: 2013–14
