= Volodymyr Postolatyev =

Ukrainian footballer

Personal information
- Full name: Volodymyr Volodymyrovych Postolatyev
- Date of birth: 25 August 1979 (age 47)
- Place of birth: Nyzhnie, Ukrainian SSR
- Height: 1.88 m (6 ft 2 in)
- Position: Striker

Team information
- Current team: FC Arsenal Bila Tserkva
- Number: 18

Youth career
- Lviv Sportive School

Senior career*
Years	Team	Apps	(Gls)
1997–2000	FC Podatkova Akademiya Irpin	29	(8)
2000–2004	FC Zirka Kirovohrad	108	(16)
2004–2005	FC Zorya Luhansk	30	(9)
2005	SC Tavriya Simferopol	9	(0)
2006	FC Obolon Kyiv	6	(0)
2006	FC Zakarpattia Uzhhorod	18	(1)
2007	FC Spartak Ivano-Frankivsk	12	(4)
2007–2008	FC Desna Chernihiv	25	(10)
2008	PFC Oleksandria	14	(3)
2009–2010	Qizilqum Zarafshon	17	(8)
2011–	FC Arsenal Bila Tserkva	22	(9)
- * Club domestic league appearances and goals as of 20 November 2011

Volodymyr Postolatyev (Ukrainian: Володимир Володимирович Постолатьєв; born 25 August 1979) is a Ukrainian former professional footballer who played as a striker.

Postolatyev is the product of the Lviv Sportive School System. He spent a large part of his career as a player in different clubs of the Ukrainian First League and the Ukrainian Premier League.

== Honours ==
Individual

- Desna Chernihiv Player of the Year: 2008
