= José Silvano =

Spanish footballer

Personal information
- Full name: José Silvano Ángelo
- Date of birth: 20 May 1980 (age 46)
- Place of birth: Palma, Spain
- Height: 1.74 m (5 ft 8 1/2 in)
- Position: Midfielder

Youth career
- 1995–1999: Mallorca

Senior career*
Years	Team	Apps	(Gls)
1996–1997	Mallorca B	7	(1)
1999–2002	Constancia		
2002–2004	Las Palmas B		
2002	Las Palmas	1	(0)
2004	Vecindario	11	(0)
2004–2005	Constancia	34	(3)
2005–2009	Fuerteventura	90	(3)
2009–2010	Guijuelo	21	(0)
2010–2011	Tenisca	1	(0)
2011	Gáldar		
2011–2012	Tenisca	30	(0)
2012–2016	Mensajero	114	(1)

International career
1995–1996	Spain U16	6	(0)

Managerial career
- 2018–2019: Mensajero
- * Club domestic league appearances and goals

José Silvano Ángelo (born 20 May 1980) is a Spanish former footballer and coach who played as a defensive midfielder.

Silvano played almost his entire career in the lower leagues, and almost exclusively in his native region of the Balearic Islands or the neighbouring Canary Islands. In the 2002–03 season he appeared in one Segunda División match, with UD Las Palmas, away against Albacete Balompié (1–2 loss, 90 minutes played).
