= 2007–08 in Ukrainian football =

Football in Ukraine
- Season: 2007–08

Men's football
- Premier League: Shakhtar Donetsk
- League 1: Illichivets Mariupol
- League 2: Knyazha Shchaslyve (Group A); Komunalnyk Luhansk (Group B)
- Amateur League: FC Luzhany (2008); Bastion Illichivsk (2007)
- Cup: Shakhtar Donetsk
- Amateur Cup: Irpin Horenychi (2008); Yednist-2 Plysky (2007)
- Super Cup: Dynamo Kyiv

Women's football
- League High: Zhytlobud-1 Kharkiv (2008); Naftokhimik Kalush (2007)
- Women's Cup: Zhytlobud-1 Kharkiv (2008); Zhytlobud-1 Kharkiv (2007)

The 2007–08 season was the 17th season of competitive association football in Ukraine since dissolution of the Soviet Union.

== Men's club football ==
League	Promoted to league	Relegated from league
Premier League	Naftovyk-Ukrnafta Okhtyrka; Zakarpattya Uzhhorod	Illichivets Mariupol; Stal Alchevsk
League One	Dnister Ovidiopil; Prykarpattia Ivano-Frankivsk; FC Sevastopol; Feniks-Illichovets Kalinine	~~Spartak Ivano-Frankivsk~~; ~~FC Krasyliv~~; ~~Borysfen Boryspil~~; ~~Spartak Sumy~~
League Two	Podillya Khmelnytskyi; Arsenal Bila Tserkva; Olimpik Kirovohrad; Shakhtar Sverdlovsk; Nyva-Svitanok Vinnytsia; FC Korosten; Komunalnyk Luhansk; FC Poltava; Tytan Donetsk	~~Inter Boyarka~~; ~~Lokomotyv Dvorichna~~

Note: For all scratched clubs, see section Clubs removed for more details

=== Premier League ===
Pos	Team	Pld	W	D	L	GF	GA	GD	Pts	Qualification or relegation
1	Shakhtar Donetsk (C)	30	24	2	4	75	24	+51	74	Qualification to Champions League third qualifying round
2	Dynamo Kyiv	30	22	5	3	65	26	+39	71	Qualification to Champions League second qualifying round
3	~~Metalist Kharkiv~~ (Note: Metalist Kharkiv was stripped of their bronze award for this season by the Court of Arbitration for Sport in Lausanne in August 2013 for fixing of the match Karpaty Lviv – Metalist (of 19 April 2008).)	30	19	6	5	51	27	+24	63	Qualification to UEFA Cup first round
4	Dnipro Dnipropetrovsk	30	18	5	7	40	27	+13	59	Qualification to UEFA Cup second qualifying round
5	Tavriya Simferopol	30	13	8	9	38	40	−2	47	Qualification to Intertoto Cup second round
6	Arsenal Kyiv	30	11	9	10	42	36	+6	42	
7	Chornomorets Odesa	30	11	5	14	27	33	−6	38	
8	Vorskla Poltava	30	9	9	12	28	30	−2	36	
9	Metalurh Zaporizhzhia	30	9	9	12	24	32	−8	36	
10	Karpaty Lviv	30	9	6	15	29	41	−12	33	
11	Zorya Luhansk	30	9	4	17	24	43	−19	31	
12	Metalurh Donetsk	30	6	13	11	34	39	−5	31	
13	Kryvbas Kryvyi Rih	30	7	9	14	29	39	−10	30	
14	FC Kharkiv	30	6	9	15	20	32	−12	27	
15	Naftovyk-Ukrnafta Okhtyrka (R)	30	6	8	16	18	38	−20	26	Relegation to the Ukrainian First League
16	Zakarpattia Uzhhorod (R)	30	3	9	18	17	54	−37	18	Relegation to the Ukrainian First League

Source: uafootball.net.ua
(C) Champions; (R) Relegated

=== League 1 ===
Pos	Team	Pld	W	D	L	GF	GA	GD	Pts	Promotion or relegation
1	Illichivets Mariupol (C, P)	38	26	7	5	65	26	+39	85	Promoted to Ukrainian Premier League
2	FC Lviv (P)	38	23	5	10	58	29	+29	74	Promoted to Ukrainian Premier League
3	Obolon Kyiv	38	22	6	10	67	42	+25	72	
4	Desna Chernihiv	38	20	7	11	61	44	+17	67	
5	Dynamo-2 Kyiv	38	19	6	13	64	52	+12	63	
6	Ihroservice Simferopol	38	18	6	14	50	45	+5	60	
7	Stal Alchevsk	38	15	13	10	52	44	+8	58	
8	PFC Oleksandria	38	14	15	9	41	32	+9	57	
9	Volyn Lutsk (Note: FC Volyn Lutsk was docked three tournament points in accordance with the decision of the Bureau of PFL of 15 April 2008.)	38	16	8	14	61	55	+6	53	
10	MFK Mykolaiv (R)	38	13	13	12	33	27	+6	52	Relegated to Ukrainian Second League (Note: MFK Mykolaiv informed the PFL season on 26 June 2008 that the City Administration of Mykolaiv will not be financing the team in the 2008/09 season. On 1 July 2008 the team was dissolved. On 17 July 2008 the club reapplies to the PFL and are readmitted into Druha Liha Group A for the 2008-09 season.)
11	Krymteplitsia Molodizhne	38	13	11	14	49	43	+6	50	
12	FC Dniester Ovidiopol	38	12	13	13	33	39	−6	49	
13	Enerhetyk Burshtyn	38	13	9	16	39	44	−5	48	
14	Helios Kharkiv	38	13	8	17	31	41	−10	47	
15	PFC Sevastopol	38	12	7	19	38	55	−17	43	
16	FC Feniks-Illichovets Kalinine	38	11	8	19	35	56	−21	41	
17	Prykarpattia Ivano-Frankivsk	38	11	6	21	37	67	−30	39	Avoided relegation (Note: Prykarpattia Ivano-Frankivsk remains in the Persha Liha after MFK Mykolaiv dissolved and relegated.)
18	Dnipro Cherkasy (Note: FC Dnipro Cherkasy docked six tournament points in accordance with the decision of the Bureau of PFL of 19 June 2008 and 3 July 2008.) (R)	38	8	17	13	43	43	0	35	Relegated to Ukrainian Second League
19	CSCA Kyiv (R)	38	7	6	25	36	74	−38	27	Relegated to Ukrainian Second League
20	Stal Dniprodzerzhynsk (R)	38	3	11	24	23	58	−35	20	Relegated to Ukrainian Second League

(C) Champions; (P) Promoted; (R) Relegated

=== League 2 ===
Pos	Team	Pld	W	D	L	GF	GA	GD	Pts	Promotion or relegation
1	FC Knyazha Schaslyve (C, P)	30	24	5	1	70	13	+57	77	Promoted to First League
2	FC Nyva Ternopil	30	18	10	2	52	15	+37	64	
3	FC Podillya-Khmelnytskyi	30	17	7	6	47	28	+19	58	(Note: FC Podillya-Khmelnytskyi, FC Nyva-Svitanok Vinnytsia, FC Korosten and FC Arsenal Bila Tserkva enter the competition.)
4	FC Bukovyna Chernivtsi	30	17	6	7	43	25	+18	57	
5	FC Obolon-2 Kyiv	30	15	6	9	50	36	+14	51	
6	FC Yednist' Plysky	30	14	6	10	34	32	+2	48	
7	FC Arsenal Bila Tserkva	30	13	7	10	28	31	−3	46	
8	FC Korosten Korosten	30	11	11	8	26	22	+4	44	
9	FC Nyva-Svitanok Vinnytsia	30	10	5	15	23	40	−17	35	
10	FC Dynamo-3 Kyiv	30	9	5	16	30	43	−13	32	Withdrew (Note: FC Dynamo-3 Kyiv withdrew out of courtesy before the start of the next season to allow MFK Mykolaiv to enter the competition.)
11	FC Ros' Bila Tserkva	30	8	6	16	28	49	−21	30	
12	FC Enerhiya Yuzhnoukrainsk	30	7	9	14	22	47	−25	30	Withdrew (Note: FC Enerhiya Yuzhnoukrainsk withdrew from the PFL at the end of the season citing financial difficulties. However, the team indicated that they will return to the PFL in the 2009-10 season. They did not hold to their promise.)
13	FC Nafkom Brovary	30	7	8	15	33	46	−13	29	
14	FC Veres Rivne	30	7	8	15	25	44	−19	29	
15	FC Karpaty-2 Lviv	30	7	3	20	33	53	−20	24	
16	FC Naftovyk Dolyna	30	4	2	24	13	33	−20	14	Withdrew (Note: FC Naftovyk Dolyna withdrew after the first half of the season. Technical victories were awarded to their opponents in the second half of the season.)

(C) Champions; (P) Promoted
Notes:

Pos	Team	Pld	W	D	L	GF	GA	GD	Pts	Promotion or relegation
1	Komunalnyk Luhansk (C, P)	34	22	7	5	56	26	+30	73	Promoted to First League
2	Tytan Armyansk	34	22	5	7	74	39	+35	71	
3	Arsenal Kharkiv	34	21	8	5	62	20	+42	71	
4	Khimik Krasnoperekopsk	34	21	6	7	54	28	+26	69	Withdrew (Note: FC Khimik Krasnoperekopsk did not submit a license for the next season and withdrew from the PFL.)
5	Shakhtar Sverdlovsk	34	20	6	8	46	27	+19	66	(Note: FC Olimpik Kirovohrad, FC Poltava, FC Shakhtar Sverdlovsk, FC Komunalnyk Luhansk and FC Titan Donetsk enter the competition.)
6	Olimpik Donetsk	34	19	6	9	66	41	+25	63	
7	Shakhtar-3 Donetsk	34	15	8	11	57	50	+7	53	
8	Kremin Kremenchuk	34	14	8	12	49	46	+3	50	
9	Olkom Melitopol	34	14	7	13	38	34	+4	49	
10	Illichivets-2 Mariupol	34	12	8	14	43	62	−19	44	
11	FC Poltava	34	11	10	13	36	51	−15	43	
12	Tytan Donetsk	34	11	7	16	44	52	−8	40	
13	Yavir Krasnopillya	34	10	7	17	36	62	−26	37	
14	Hirnyk Kryvyi Rih	34	9	10	15	43	51	−8	37	
15	Hirnyk-Sport Komsomolsk	34	9	7	18	38	59	−21	34	
16	Olimpik Kirovohrad	34	7	4	23	34	68	−34	25	
17	Metalurh-2 Zaporizhzhia	34	6	7	21	33	66	−33	25	
18	Hazovyk-KhGV Kharkiv	34	1	3	30	14	41	−27	6	Withdrew (Note: FC Hazovyk-KhGV Kharkiv withdrew after the first half of the season. Technical victories were awarded to their opponents in the second half of the season.)

Source: Professional Football League of Ukraine, Second League Group B
Rules for classification: 1) points; 2) goal difference; 3) number of goals scored.
(C) Champions; (P) Promoted

=== Cup competitions ===
==== Ukrainian Cup ====
7 May 2008
19:00 LST

Shakhtar Donetsk	2–0	Dynamo Kyiv
Hladkyy 44'; Hai 78'	(Report)

Metalist Stadium, Kharkiv
Attendance: 28,000
Referee: Viktor Shvetsov (FIFA)

==== Super Cup ====
10 July 2007

Dynamo Kyiv	2–2	Shakhtar Donetsk
Mykhalyk 26', 30'	Report	14' Gladkiy; 55' Tkachenko
Penalties
Aliyev (penalty missed); Ninković (penalty scored); Dedechko (penalty scored); Marković (penalty scored); Morozyuk (penalty scored)	4–2	(penalty missed) Brandão; (penalty scored) Fernandinho; (penalty missed) Jádson; (penalty scored) Raț

Central Stadium "Chornomorets", Odesa
Attendance: 32,000
Referee: Pieter Vink (Netherlands)

== Women's club football ==
League	Promoted to league	Relegated from league
Higher League	Voskhod Stara Maiachka	~~Lehenda-ShVSM Chernihiv~~; Ateks SDIuShOR-16 Kyiv

Note: For all scratched clubs, see section Clubs removed for more details

=== Higher League ===
2008 Vyshcha Liha (women)
