= Oleksandr Hrebinyuk =

Soviet footballer and Ukrainian coach

Personal information
- Full name: Oleksandr Viktorovych Hrebinyuk
- Date of birth: 23 June 1981 (age 45)
- Place of birth: Horishni Plavni, Ukrainian SSR
- Height: 1.88 m (6 ft 2 in)
- Positions: Midfielder; striker

Senior career*
Years	Team	Apps	(Gls)
1997–1998	Hirnyk-Sport Komsomolsk	1	(0)
1999	Vorskla-2 Poltava	12	(0)
1999	Vorskla Poltava	0	(0)
1999	Hirnyk-Sport Komsomolsk	9	(0)
2000–2002	Kryvbas Kryvyi Rih	34	(1)
2003	Kryvbas-2 Kryvyi Rih	21	(7)
2003	Spartak Sumy	10	(0)
2004	Mykolaiv	17	(1)
2005–2008	Oleksandriya	103	(28)
2008–2009	Desna Chernihiv	29	(4)
2009–2010	Mash'al Mubarek	27	(3)
2010	Lviv	5	(0)
2011	Desna Chernihiv	4	(0)
2011–2012	Nyva Ternopil	29	(4)
2012	Karlivka	23	(2)
- * Club domestic league appearances and goals

Oleksandr Viktorovych Hrebinyuk (Ukrainian: Олександр Вікторович Гребінюк; born 6 June 1981) is a Ukrainian retired football player.

== Career ==
Oleksandr Hrebieniuk, started his career in Hirnyk-Sport Horishni Plavni. In 1999 he played for FC Vorskla-2 Poltava and Vorskla Poltava and Hirnyk-Sport Horishni Plavni. From 2000 until 2002 he played for Kryvbas Kryvyi Rih and Kryvbas-2 Kryvyi Rih. In 2003 he moved to Spartak Sumyk and in 2004, he played for Mykolaiv. In 2005 he moved for three seasons to Oleksandriya and it was the most successful was the period of performances as a part of Oleksandriya, where Grebinyuk played 103 matches and scored 28 goals. He made his debut for Oleksandriya on April 7, 2005 in the home match of the 13th round of Group B of the second league of the Ukrainian Championship against Olkom from Melitopol. The match ended in a draw, Alexander was in the starting lineup in that match, but in the 46th minute of the match he was replaced by Maxim Kundel. On May 2, 2005, he scored his first goal for the club in the victory the victorious match against Ovidiopolsky Dnistra of the 19th round of the Group of B of Ukrainian Second League in the season 2005–06. In that match, PFC "Oleksandriya" was able to win with a 2: 0 rakhunk, except for the goal Oleksandr was identified in that match with a card (for 58 minutes) He got promoted to Ukrainian First League, after the season 2005–06 and become to the top scorer in group B with 16 goals.

=== Desna Chernihiv ===
In 2008 he joined Desna Chernihiv for one season where he played 31 games and scored 6 goals.

=== Mash'al Mubarek ===
In the summer of 2009 he went abroad, defending the colors of the Uzbek Mash'al Mubarek, where he played 27 matches and scored 3 goals. In the summer of 2010 he returned to Ukraine signed a contract with Lviv.

=== Desna Chernihiv ===
In 2011–2012 season started in Desna Chernihiv, but has been defending Nyva Ternopil's colors since September. Oleksandr's last professional club was Karlivka, the colors of which he defended in the summer-autumn part of the 2012/13 season.

After that he played in the amateur teams of FC Globyne (Globyne) in 2013-2014 and FC Rokyta (Rokyta village) in 2015.
