= Edgar Caseiro =

Portuguese footballer

Personal information
- Full name: Sérgio Edgar Miranda Alegre Caseiro
- Date of birth: 20 July 1980 (age 46)
- Place of birth: Portugal
- Positions: Midfielder; winger

Senior career*
Years	Team	Apps	(Gls)
-1998/99	S.L. Benfica	0	(0)
1999	Córdoba CF	2	(0)
1999-2000	F.C. Felgueiras 1932	18	(2)
2000-01	Rio Ave F.C.	1	(0)
2000-01	Leixões S.C.	6	(1)
2001-03	Valencia CF	0	(0)
2003-04	F.C. Maia	17	(0)
2004-05	Padroense F.C.	14	(0)
- Football Club Atert Bissen
Medal record
Men's football
Representing Portugal
UEFA European Under-16 Championship
Winner	1996 Austria
- * Club domestic league appearances and goals

Sérgio Edgar Miranda Alegre Caseiro (born 20 July 1980 in Portugal) is a Portuguese retired footballer.

== Career ==
After helping Portugal win the 1996 UEFA European Under-16 Championship, Caseiro started training with the first team of S.L. Benfica, the most successful team in Portugal. However, he failed to make an appearance for the club and after making 2 appearances with Spanish second division side Córdoba CF in the Spanish second division, played for Portuguese lower league outfits Felgueiras 1932, Rio Ave, Leixões S.C. before joining Spanish top flight side Valencia, where he again failed to make appearance.

In 2003, Caseiro returned to Portugal with Maia despite the possibility staying in Spain. However, he left at the end of 2003/04 due Maia's financial problems and later said he "made a mistake when I decided to return to Portuguese football".

At the end of 2004/05, Caseiro retired from football at the age of 25.

In 2013, he came out of retirement to sign for Atert Bissen in the Luxembourgish lower leagues.
