= Oliver Beer (footballer) =

German footballer (born 1979)

Personal information
- Date of birth: 14 September 1979 (age 47)
- Place of birth: Regensburg, West Germany
- Height: 1.80 m (5 ft 11 in)
- Position: Defender

Youth career
- SC Regensburg
- Jahn Regensburg
- –1991: 1860 Munich
- 1991–1997: Bayern Munich

Senior career*
Years	Team	Apps	(Gls)
1997–2001	Bayern Munich (A)	67	(0)
2001–2004	1. FC Schweinfurt 05	71	(1)
2004–2005	FC Ingolstadt 04	9	(1)
2005–2006	Preußen Münster	45	(1)
2006–2008	VfL Osnabrück	29	(0)
Total		221	(3)

International career
1999	Germany U-21	3	(0)

Managerial career
- 2019: 1860 Munich (caretaker)
- * Club domestic league appearances and goals

Oliver Beer (born 14 September 1979) is a German football coach and former player. He last coached 1860 Munich.
