= Fredy (footballer, born 1979) =

Portuguese footballer

Personal information
- Full name: Frederico Emanuel Tavares Martins
- Date of birth: 14 August 1979 (age 47)
- Place of birth: Estarreja, Portugal
- Height: 1.74 m (5 ft 8 1/2 in)
- Position: Left back

Youth career
- 1991–1992: Estarreja
- 1992–1993: Avanca
- 1993–1996: Porto
- 1996–1998: Paris Saint-Germain

Senior career*
Years	Team	Apps	(Gls)
1998–2002	Felgueiras	106	(0)
2001	→ Mallorca B (loan)	3	(0)
2002–2005	Académica	69	(3)
2005–2006	Paços Ferreira	41	(1)
2007–2009	CFR Cluj	6	(0)
2009	Alki Larnaca	0	(0)
2010	Gil Vicente	8	(0)
2010–2011	Anadia	5	(0)
Total		238	(4)

International career
1996	Portugal U16	11	(0)
1998–1999	Portugal U20	16	(0)
2000–2002	Portugal U21	15	(0)
2003	Portugal B	1	(0)
- * Club domestic league appearances and goals

Frederico Emanuel Tavares Martins (born 14 August 1979 in Estarreja, Aveiro District), known as Fredy, is a Portuguese former footballer who played mainly as a left back.

== Honours ==
CFR Cluj

- Liga I: 2007–08
- Cupa României: 2007–08
