= Armen Akopyan =

Ukrainian footballer (born 1980)

Personal information
- Date of birth: 15 January 1980 (age 46)
- Place of birth: Zaporizhzhia, Ukrainian SSR
- Height: 1.80 m (5 ft 11 in)
- Position: Midfielder

Senior career*
| Years | Team | Apps | (Gls) |
| 1996–2005 | Metalurh Zaporizhzhia | 187 | (16) |
| 1998–2002 | → Metalurh-2 Zaporizhzhia | 12 | (1) |
| 2006 | Metalurh Donetsk | 8 | (0) |
| 2006 | Kryvbas Kryvyi Rih | 12 | (0) |
| 2007 | Metalurh Zaporizhzhia | 4 | (0) |
| 2009 | Poltava | 10 | (2) |
| 2010 | Ordabasy | 5 | (1) |
| 2011 | Mykolaiv | 4 | (0) |
| 2011 | Avanhard Kramatorsk | 16 | (1) |
- * Club domestic league appearances and goals

Armen Akopyan (Ukrainian: Армен Акопян, born 15 January 1980) is a Ukrainian football midfielder of Armenian ethnicity.

Akopyan spent most of his career playing for Ukrainian team FC Metalurh Zaporizhya.
