= Adem Dursun =

Turkish footballer

Personal information
- Full name: Adem Dursun
- Date of birth: December 26, 1979 (age 46)
- Place of birth: Yıldızeli, Turkey
- Height: 1.86 m (6 ft 1 in)
- Position: Central defender

Youth career
- 1996–1997: Ankaragücü

Senior career*
Years	Team	Apps	(Gls)
1997–2005	Ankaragücü	163	(5)
1998–1999	→ Gölcükspor (loan)		
2005	Beşiktaş	10	(0)
2006	Gaziantepspor	14	(0)
2006–2007	Gençlerbirliği	24	(1)
2007–2009	Kayseri Erciyesspor		
2009–2010	Boluspor		
2010	Kayseri Erciyesspor		

International career
1996	Turkey U16	8	(0)
1996–1997	Turkey U17	6	(0)
1997	Turkey U18	6	(0)
1999	Turkey U19	1	(0)
2001	Turkey U21	8	(0)
2004	Turkey A2	2	(0)

Managerial career
- 2015–2016: Sivas Belediye Spor U14
- * Club domestic league appearances and goals

Adem Dursun (born December 26, 1979) is a retired Turkish footballer. He formerly played for Kayseri Erciyesspor in the TFF First League as a central defender.
