= Andriy Pisnyi =

Ukrainian footballer

Personal information
- Full name: Andriy Mykolayovych Pisnyi
- Date of birth: 20 September 1980 (age 46)
- Place of birth: Ukrainian SSR, Soviet Union
- Height: 1.85 m (6 ft 1 in)
- Position: Defender

Team information
- Current team: Mash'al Mubarek

Senior career*
Years	Team	Apps	(Gls)
1997–2000	Dnipro Dnipropetrovsk	1	(0)
1997–1998	Dnipro-2 Dnipropetrovsk	34	(4)
2000	Dnipro-3 Dnipropetrovsk	8	(0)
2001–2002	Volyn Lutsk	35	(4)
2003	Borex-Borysfen Borodyanka	31	(4)
2004–2007	Naftovyk Okhtyrka	107	(12)
2008	Zakarpattia Uzhhorod	8	(0)
2008	Desna Chernihiv	2	(0)
2009	Ihroservice Simferopol	12	(0)
2009–	Mash'al Mubarek		
- * Club domestic league appearances and goals as of 20 July 2010

Andriy Mykolayovych Pisnyi (Ukrainian: Андрій Миколайович Пісний; born 20 September 1980) is a Ukrainian footballer who plays for Uzbek League club Mash'al Mubarek.

== Career ==
Pisnyi began playing football with FC Dnipro Dnipropetrovsk's youth side, and would eventually play one Ukrainian Premier League match for the club in 1998. He also played in the Ukrainian Premier League for FC Volyn Lutsk during the 2002–03 season and FC Naftovyk-Ukrnafta Okhtyrka and FC Zakarpattia Uzhhorod during the 2007–08 season. Pisnyi joined FC Ihroservice Simferopol in March 2009, but would leave for Mash'al in August 2009.
