= Maksym Stoyan =

Ukrainian former footballer

Personal information
- Full name: Maksym Stoyan
- Date of birth: 19 August 1980 (age 46)
- Place of birth: Hrebinky, Vasylkiv Raion, Kyiv Oblast, Ukrainian SSR
- Height: 1.79 m (5 ft 10 in)
- Position: Defender

Senior career*
Years	Team	Apps	(Gls)
1997–2003	Borysfen Boryspil	184	(1)
2002	→ Borysfen-2 Boryspil	1	(0)
2002	→ Arsenal Kyiv (loan)	3	(0)
2004	Chornomorets Odesa	21	(0)
2005–2006	Obolon Kyiv	57	(4)
2007–2008	Dnipro Cherkasy	50	(0)
2008	Desna Chernihiv	11	(0)
2009	Mykolaiv	3	(0)
2009–2010	Desna Chernihiv	28	(0)
2010–2012	Arsenal Bila Tserkva	64	(0)
- * Club domestic league appearances and goals

Maksym Stoyan (born 19 August 1980) is a Ukrainian former footballer who played as a defender.
