= Yuriy Nikitenko =

Soviet footballer and Ukrainian coach

Personal information
- Date of birth: 28 March 1974 (age 52)
- Place of birth: Odesa, Ukrainian SSR, USSR
- Height: 1.84 m (6 ft 1/2 in)
- Position: Goalkeeper

Senior career*
Years	Team	Apps	(Gls)
1991	Zirka Kirovohrad	1	(0)
1992–1993	Chornomorets-2 Odesa	43	(0)
1994–2000	Nyva Ternopil	60	(0)
1998	→ Krystal Chortkiv (loan)	2	(0)
2000	→ Ternopil-Nyva-2	1	(0)
2001–2004	Volyn Lutsk	43	(0)
2005–2006	Podillya Khmelnytskyi	32	(0)
2007	Spartak Ivano-Frankivsk	2	(0)
2007–2008	Desna Chernihiv	35	(0)
- * Club domestic league appearances and goals as of 16 December 2021

Yuriy Nikitenko (Ukrainian: Юрій Миколайович Нікітенко, born 28 March 1974) is a Ukrainian retired footballer.

== Career ==
Yuriy Nikitenko was born on 28 March 1974. He began professionally in Kyiv in Zirka Kropyvnytskyi, playing a single match in a warehouse in 1991. Then he moved to Odesa, training with the first team of Chornomorets Odesa. He did not get a place in the main team and as such he was transferred to Chornomorets-2 Odesa, where on 14 April 1992 he made his debut in a home match in the Ukrainian Second League against the Nikopolsk Metallurgist. The match ended with a victory for Nikopolsky with a score 0:2. Nikitenko entered the field in the 50th minute, having replaced Eugen Nemodruk. With Chornomorets-2 Odesa, in the Ukrainian championships he played 43 matches and 2 matches in Ukrainian Cup.

In 1994, he moved to Nyva Ternopil, without becoming the primary goalkeeper. He made his debut for Nyva Ternopil on 28 May 1994, in the home match of the 30th round of the Ukrainian Premier League against Torpedo Zaporizhzhia. Nikitenko entered on the field in the 85th minute, having replaced Dmytro Tyapushkin. In 1998, he played 2 matches for Krystal Chortkiv, and in 2000, he played 1 matche for Nyva Ternopil 2.

From 2001 to 2004, he played for Volyn Lutsk. On 17 December 2001, he made his debut for the team at the home match of the 1st round of the Ukrainian First League against Borysfen Boryspil. Volyn Lutsk won 43 matches in the championships of Ukraine, in which they conceded 37 goals. More than 9 matches (7 missed goals) were at the warehouse of the Lutsk players for the Ukrainian Cup.

From 2005 to 2006, he moved to Podillya Khmelnytskyi, where he made his debut on 17 April 2005 in the home match against Brovarsky "Nafkom" of the 24th round of the Ukrainian First League. He entered in the 75th minute, replacing Oleg Venchak. Stretching his transfer to Podillya in the Ukrainian championships he won 32 matches, in which he conceded 33 goals. Another match (1 goal conceded) won the Ukrainian Cup. In 2007, he played 2 matches with Spartak Ivano-Frankivsk.

From 2007 to 2008, he played for Desna Chernihiv. For the Chernihiv team, he made his debut on 19 April 2007 in the 1st round of the Ukrainian First League against Burshtinsky "Energetika". Nikitenko played the whole match, at the same time having closed the gates of his club "on lock". Desna Chernihiv played 35 matches in the Ukrainian First League.

From 2011 to 2012, he moved to the amateur club FC Sovignon Tayirove in the Odesa region. In 2011, the club won the Chernihiv Oblast Football Championship.

== Honours ==
FC Sovignon Tayirove

- Chernihiv Oblast Football Championship: 2011

Volyn Lutsk

- Ukrainian First League: 2001–02
