= Ihor Shvets =

Soviet footballer and Ukrainian coach

Personal information
- Full name: Ihor Bohdanovych Shvets
- Date of birth: 14 March 1985 (age 41)
- Place of birth: Berezhany, Soviet Union, (now Ukraine)
- Height: 1.84 m (6 ft 0 in)
- Position: Forward

Senior career*
Years	Team	Apps	(Gls)
2002	Ternopil	1	(0)
2003–2005	Borysfen Boryspil	32	(1)
2003–2004	→ Borysfen-2 Boryspil	16	(4)
2004	→ Boreks-Borysfen Borodianka	13	(0)
2006–2007	Vorskla Poltava	17	(2)
2008	Desna Chernihiv	17	(2)
2008	Oleksandriya	4	(0)
2009	Qizilqum Zarafshon	9	(0)
2009	Enerhetyk Burshtyn	7	(1)
2010	Arsenal Bila Tserkva	13	(1)
2011	VfB Sangerhausen		
2012	Poltava	11	(2)
2012	Zirka Kirovohrad	2	(0)
2012–2013	Nyva Ternopil	11	(3)
2014	Stal Sanok	2	(0)
2014	Sokil Berezhany		
- * Club domestic league appearances and goals

Ihor Bohdanovych Shvets (Ukrainian: Ігор Богданович Швець) is a Ukrainian former professional footballer who played as a forward.

== Career ==
A pupil of Ternopil football, he graduated from the Ternopil Children's and Youth Sports School. He began professional performances in Ternopil, which played in the second league and was the Niva's farm club, but in the summer of 2002 the club was disbanded and Shvets left the team.

Since 2003, he played for Borysfen Boryspil, which in the 2002–03 season helped to take second place in the first league and for the first time in history to reach the Premier League. In the elite division, Shvets made his debut on 19 June 2004, in a won match against Dnipro (1–0), but it was his only match of that season for the main team, and the rest of the time Shvets played for the Ukrainian Second League for Borysfen-2 Boryspil.

From the next season, Shvets began to be involved in the games of the main team, but the team took the last place and was eliminated from the Major League. However, six months later, at the beginning of 2006, Shvets returned to the Ukrainian Premier League, signing a contract with Vorskla Poltava. As part of it, he scored his debut goal in Ukrainian Premier League, on 5 November 2006, against Metalist, but in two years Shvets never became its main striker, having played only 17 matches in the Major League during this time.

From the beginning of 2008 until the end of the season, he played for the first-league Desna Chernihiv, after which he moved to Oleksandriya, which played in the same division, but did not play in its composition.

During the 2009–10 season he played for the first-league Enerhetyk Burshtyn, and in the next one for Arsenal Bila Tserkva.

In early 2012, he signed a contract with the second-league Poltava, which in the same season helped to reach the first league for the first time in history, after which he moved to the first-league Zirka Kropyvnytskyi. However, even in the same offseason, having played only two matches for the Kirovograd club, he managed to move to Ternopil Niva.

In the first half of 2014, he played for Polish Stal Sanok.
