= Volodymyr Hapon =

Ukrainian footballer and coach

Personal information
- Full name: Volodymyr Arkadiyovych Hapon
- Date of birth: 3 August 1979 (age 47)
- Place of birth: Lutsk, Ukrainian SSR
- Height: 1.70 m (5 ft 7 in)
- Position: Midfielder

Team information
- Current team: FC Volyn Lutsk (coach)

Senior career*
Years	Team	Apps	(Gls)
1995	FC Volyn Lutsk	4	(0)
1995	FC ENKO Lutsk	3	(1)
1996–1997	FC Volyn Lutsk	47	(3)
1998–2000	FC Chornomorets Odesa	73	(12)
1999–2000	→ FC Chornomorets-2 Odesa (loan)	12	(2)
2001	FC Signal Odesa		
2001–2002	FC Volyn Lutsk	30	(0)
2003	FC Uralan Elista	13	(0)
2004	PFC Nyva Vinnytsia	11	(0)
2004–2008	FC Naftovyk-Ukrnafta Okhtyrka	80	(5)
2008	FC Desna Chernihiv	6	(1)
2008–2009	FC Volyn Lutsk	7	(1)
2009	FC Karpaty Kamianka-Buzka	2	(0)
2015	FC Laska Boratyn	8	(2)
2016	FC Lutsk	4	(0)

International career
1998	Ukraine U-21	1	(0)

Managerial career
- 2013–2020: Volyn Lutsk (academy coach)
- 2020–: Volyn Lutsk (coach)
- * Club domestic league appearances and goals

Volodymyr Arkadiyovych Hapon (Ukrainian: Володимир Аркадійович Гапон; born 3 August 1979 in Lutsk) is a Ukrainian football coach and a former player. He currently works as a coach of FC Volyn Lutsk.

He made his debut in the Ukrainian Premier League at the age of 15 years, 9 months and 17 days, which is the second-youngest after Yuriy Fenin.

He played only a single game for the Ukraine national under-21 football team against Poland in 2000 coming as a substitute for Volodymyr Yaksmanytskyi.
