= Yuriy Slabyshev =

Ukrainian footballer

Personal information
- Full name: Yuriy Oleksandrovych Slabyshev
- Date of birth: 6 October 1979 (age 47)
- Place of birth: Ukrainian SSR, USSR
- Height: 1.84 m (6 ft 0 in)
- Position: Forward

Senior career*
Years	Team	Apps	(Gls)
1996–1999	Torpedo Zaporizhzhia	29	(3)
1998–1999	→ Viktor Zaporizhzhia (loan)	14	(2)
1999–2004	Dnipro Dnipropetrovsk	39	(6)
1999–2003	→ Dnipro-2 Dnipropetrovsk	36	(7)
2001–2002	→ Dnipro-3 Dnipropetrovsk	10	(2)
2002	→ Kryvbas Kryvyi Rih (loan)	5	(1)
2003–2004	→ Borysfen Boryspil (loan)	13	(0)
2003	→ Borysfen-2 Boryspil (loan)	2	(1)
2004	→ Boreks-Borysfen Borodianka (loan)	4	(1)
2005	Podillya Khmelnytskyi	3	(0)
2005–2006	Spartak Ivano-Frankivsk	18	(4)
2007	Enerhetyk Burshtyn	10	(0)
2008	Desna Chernihiv	13	(1)
2008	Komunalnyk Luhansk	4	(0)
2009	Sumy	9	(3)
2011–2012	Avangard Kramatorsk	27	(5)
2012–2013	Kremin Kremenchuk	32	(2)
2013–2014	Tavria-Skif Rozdol	13	(13)
2015–2017	Motor Zaporizhia	32	(12)

Managerial career
- 2025: Metalurh Zaporizhzhia (caretaker)
- * Club domestic league appearances and goals

Yuriy Oleksandrovych Slabyshev (Ukrainian: Юрій Олександрович Слабишев; born 6 October 1979) is a Ukrainian retired footballer.

== Career ==
In 1996, he started his football career in the local Torpedo Zaporizhia, from where he was loaned to Viktor Zaporizhzhia in 1998. Slabyshev made his debut at Vyshcha Liha on August 11, 1996, when Torpedo was visiting Kremin Kremenchuk. Slabyshev came out as a substitute for Kyrylo Burkhan in the 69th minute and scored a goal after seven minutes, putting Torpedo ahead in the game. While playing for Torpedo, Slabyshev primarily played as a substitute until he left the club.

In the summer of 1999 he was invited to the Dnipro Dnipropetrovsk, where on 27 September 2001, he scored against Fiorentina at the Stadio Artemio Franchi in the UEFA Cup 2001–02 season It became his only game at the continental competitions. In the second half of 2002, he defended the colors of Kryvbas Kryvyi Rih. From July 2003, he left Dnipro on loan to Borysfen Boryspil, playing just east of Kyiv, from where he was loaned to the Borysfen's reserves as well, such as Borysfen-2 and Boreks-Borysfen. Located in the right-bank suburbs of Kyiv, Boreks-Borysfen from Borodianka was a farm club for Borysfen at that time.

In July 2005, he joined Podillya Khmelnytskyi, but after two months, he moved to Spartak Ivano-Frankivsk. From July 2007, he defended the colors of Enerhetyk Burshtyn. In January 2008, during the winter break, he left the Ukrainian Wild West and moved to Desna Chernihiv, the main club in the city of Chernihiv and the region. The next season, Slabyshev moved to Komunalnyk Luhansk. But the ambitious Luhansk club folded and withdrew from professional competitions already in October 2008, and for a while Slabyshev was unaffiliated. In August 2009, he signed a contract with Sumy, where he played for 4 months in Druha Liha (tier 3). In 2010, he moved to Avanhard Kramatorsk, which was just revived, and with which Slabyshev returned to professional competitions in 2011. In July 2012 he joined Kremin Kremenchuk.

In 2013, Slabyshev retired from professional football playing for various amateur teams mostly out of the Zaporizhia Oblast.

== Managerial career ==
In April 2025 he was appointed as caretaker of Metalurh Zaporizhzhia together with Serhiy Rudyka and Ruslan Galiguzov.

== Honours ==
Dnipro-2 Dnipropetrovsk

- Ukrainian Second League: 1999–2000
