= Ihor Pokarynin =

Ukrainian footballer

Personal information
- Full name: Ihor Pokarynin
- Date of birth: 30 April 1981 (age 45)
- Place of birth: Odesa, Soviet Union
- Height: 1.81 m (5 ft 11 1/2 in)
- Position: Midfielder

Senior career*
Years	Team	Apps	(Gls)
1998	Dynamo-SKA Odesa	10	(3)
1999	SK Odesa	9	(1)
1999–2001	Chornomorets-2 Odesa	28	(0)
2002–2003	Mykolaiv	34	(1)
2002–2003	→ Olimpiya FC AES Yuzhnoukrainsk	3	(1)
2004–2005	Podillya Khmelnytskyi	63	(14)
2006–2007	Ventspils	28	(2)
2007–2008	Desna Chernihiv	9	(0)
2008	→ Desna-2 Chernihiv	1	(0)
2008	Dniester Ovidiopol	0	(0)
- * Club domestic league appearances and goals

Ihor Pokarynin (born 30 April 1981) is a football midfielder from Ukraine.

In 2006 his team FK Ventspils was the champions of Latvia.
