= Pavlo Klymets =

Ukrainian politician and entrepreneur

Pavlo Anatoliyovych Klymets
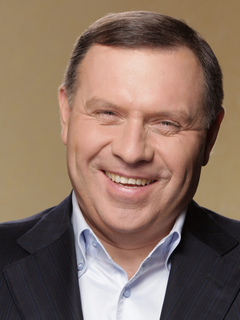
- People's deputy of Ukraine Klymets Pavlo Anatoliyovych
- Born: Pavlo Anatoliyovych Klymets; 23 June 1967 (age 59); Donetsk, Ukrainian SSR, Soviet Union
- Other occupation: Businessman

Pavlo Anatoliyovych Klymets (ukr. Павло Анатолійович Климець; born 23 July 1967) is a Ukrainian politician and entrepreneur.

== Biography ==
Klymets was born on July 23, 1967, in Donetsk, in 2006 moved with his family to Kyiv. He is a Ukrainian entrepreneur who is the founder and director of the Institute of Free Economic Zones, CEO of OLIMP GROUP, and People's Deputy of the V-VI convocation for Party of Regions.

=== Education ===
Klymets graduated from Donetsk Technical College of Industrial Automation, Donetsk National University with a degree in Finance and Credit. He is a Candidate of Science in Public Administration.

== Political activity ==
In the 1998 Ukrainian parliamentary election Klymets took part on the election list of the bloc "Party of Labor and Liberal Party – Together!", but this Bloc did not overcome 4% electoral threshold and do not get to parliament.

In the 2006 Ukrainian parliamentary election, Klymets was elected a People's Deputy of the V convocation of the Verkhovna Rada (the national parliament of Ukraine) on the party list of Party of Regions. He became a chairman of the parliamentary subcommittee on regulation of the alcohol and tobacco markets of the Verkhovna Rada Committee on Financial and Banking Matters.

In the 2007 Ukrainian parliamentary election Klymets was reelected for Party of Regions as a People's Deputy of the VI convocation. He became member of the Verkhovna Rada Committee on Agro-Industrial Complex and Land Policy.

In 2009 he became a member of the temporary investigative commission of the Verkhovna Rada on investigation of inefficient use of state assets in the sphere of agricultural and industrial complex.

In the Verkhovna Rada he worked out and presented a number of bills with the aim of promoting the development of the agricultural and industrial sector of Ukraine. He initiated bills in the areas of licensing in the alcohol and tobacco markets, excise duties, development of viticulture, horticulture and hop-growing, biofuels, reforming the agricultural and industrial complex and supporting agriculture. He was a member of the Party of Regions, but in 2010 left the party due to disagreement with certain actions of the party leaders.

In the 2014 Ukrainian parliamentary election Klymets failed to get elected to parliament; this time he was an independent candidate in electoral district 176. In the district he received 1.45% of the vote. (The district bordered Russia and its most important settlement was Chuhuiv.)

== Sports and patronage ==
In November 2008, he acquired 50% of the shares of the club Desna Chernihiv the main club in Chernihiv, from the previews owner Oleksiy Savchenko, becoming the president for one year. He sold the club in February 2009 to Valeriy Korotkov

== Awards ==
- Ukraine : Order of Merit

== See also ==
- FC Desna Chernihiv
