= Oleh Davydov =

Ukrainian footballer (born 1982)

Personal information
- Full name: Oleh Olehovych Davydov
- Date of birth: 29 March 1982 (age 44)
- Place of birth: Nizhyn, Ukrainian SSR, USSR
- Height: 1.84 m (6 ft 1/2 in)
- Position: Defender

Youth career
- 1998–1999: RVUFK Kyiv

Senior career*
Years	Team	Apps	(Gls)
2000	Svisloch-Krovlya Osipovichi	8	(0)
2001	Chornomorets-2 Odesa	9	(1)
2001	Polissya Zhytomyr	7	(0)
2003	Sevastopol	25	(3)
2004–2007	CSKA Kyiv	84	(6)
2007	Naftovyk Okhtyrka	3	(0)
2008	Desna Chernihiv	6	(1)
2008	Desna-2 Chernihiv	3	(0)
2009–2011	Zirka Kirovohrad	51	(7)
2012	Mykolaiv	25	(1)
2013–2014	Sumy	25	(0)
2015–2016	Cherkaskyi Dnipro	34	(0)
2017	Sumy	5	(0)
- * Club domestic league appearances and goals

Oleh Olehovych Davydov (Ukrainian: Олег Олегович Давидов; born 29 March 1982) is a Ukrainian retired footballer.

== Career ==
He began to play football at RVUFK (Kiev), which he graduated in 1999. The first coaches were Sivanyuk Vladimir Nikolaevich and Yashkov Vladimir Evgenievich. He made his professional football debut in 2001 in the Chornomorets-2 Odesa.

In the Ukrainian Premier League, they played 3 matches, playing as part of the Naftovyk Okhtyrka team. He made his debut on 21 July 2007 in the game against Shakhtar Donetsk. I spent only six months in Akhtyrka.

The main part of his career was spent in the Ukrainian First League, where Davydov spent more than 200 matches.

He played in the teams CSKA Kyiv, Desna Chernihiv, Zirka Kropyvnytskyi, Mykolaiv. In January 2013 he became a player at Sumy. Since 2015 he has been playing for Dnipro Cherkasy. In April 2019, by decision of the FFU FFU, he was suspended for life from any activity, including participation in the organization of match fixing.
