= Tymur Rustamov =

Ukrainian footballer

Personal information
- Full name: Tymur Rustamov
- Date of birth: 8 March 1989 (age 37)
- Place of birth: Slavutych, Soviet Union (now Ukraine)
- Height: 1.85 m (6 ft 1 in)
- Position: Defender

Youth career
- 2001–2006: Slavutych
- 2004–2005: Yunist Chernihiv
- 2004–2005: SDYuShOR Desna

Senior career*
Years	Team	Apps	(Gls)
2005–2008	Desna Chernihiv	69	(4)
2008–2009	Desna-2 Chernihiv	8	(0)
2009–2010	Desna Chernihiv	4	(0)
2010–2011	Skala Stryi	19	(2)
2011	Skala Stryi 2	1	(0)
2011–2013	Skala Stryi	42	(2)
2011–2013	Desna Chernihiv	2	(8)
2013–2014	Nyva Ternopil	8	(0)
2014–2016	Obolon Kyiv	25	(2)
2016–2017	Bukovyna	13	(1)
- * Club domestic league appearances and goals

Tymur Rustamov (Ukrainian: Рустамов Тимур Рашидович; born 8 March 1989) is a retired Ukrainian football defender.

== Career ==
In the championship of Ukraine (DUFL) he played for the teams Slavutych, Yunist Chernihiv and Desna Chernihiv, where he played a total of 53 matches and scored 19 goals. He made his professional debut in the 2005/06 season in a match between Desna Chernihiv and Brzezany's Sokol, and at the end of the season Timur won gold medals in the Second League of Ukraine.

The player spent most of his career in various clubs of the first and second leagues of Ukrainian football. In particular, in such clubs as Desna (Chernihiv), Skala (Stryi), Niva (Ternopil) and Obolon-Brovar (Kyiv). With the latter he became a silver medalist of the Second League of Ukraine.

In the winter of 2016 he moved to Bukovyna. On December 1, 2016, he stopped cooperating with the Chernivtsi team. At the end of February 2017, he signed a contract with Obolon-Brovar (Kyiv), but left the team in June of the same year.
