= Yuriy Komyahin =

Ukrainian footballer

Personal information
- Full name: Yuriy Volodymyrovych Komyahin
- Date of birth: 6 May 1984 (age 42)
- Place of birth: Kakhovka, Ukrainian SSR, Soviet Union
- Position: Midfielder

Team information
- Current team: FC Myr Hornostayivka

Youth career
- 2000–2001: RVUFK Kiev

Senior career*
Years	Team	Apps	(Gls)
2002–2004	FC Krystal Kherson	27	(0)
2002–2004	→ FC KZEZO Kakhovka (loan)	4	(0)
2004–2007	FC Hirnyk-Sport Komsomolsk	80	(14)
2007-2009	FC Desna Chernihiv	13	(1)
2008	→ FC Desna-2 Chernihiv (loan)	8	(1)
2009–2010	MFC Mykolaiv	31	(3)
2010	FC Bastion Illichivsk	14	(0)
2011	FC Zimbru Chișinău	9	(2)
2011–2014	FC Enerhiya Nova Kakhovka	73	(25)
2012	→ FC Krystal Kherson (loan)	19	(0)
2015–2017	FC Myr Hornostayivka	43	(14)
- * Club domestic league appearances and goals as of 15 August 2015

Yuriy Komyahin (Ukrainian: Юрій Володимирович Комягін; born 6 May 1984) is a Ukrainian professional footballer who plays as a midfielder for FC Myr Hornostayivka in the Ukrainian Second League.

Komyahin is a product of the Republican College of Physical Culture.

== Honours ==
SC Kakhovka

- Ukrainian football championship among amateurs: 2002, 2004
- Kherson Oblast football championship: 2002, 2004
