= Bolle reiste jüngst zu Pfingsten =

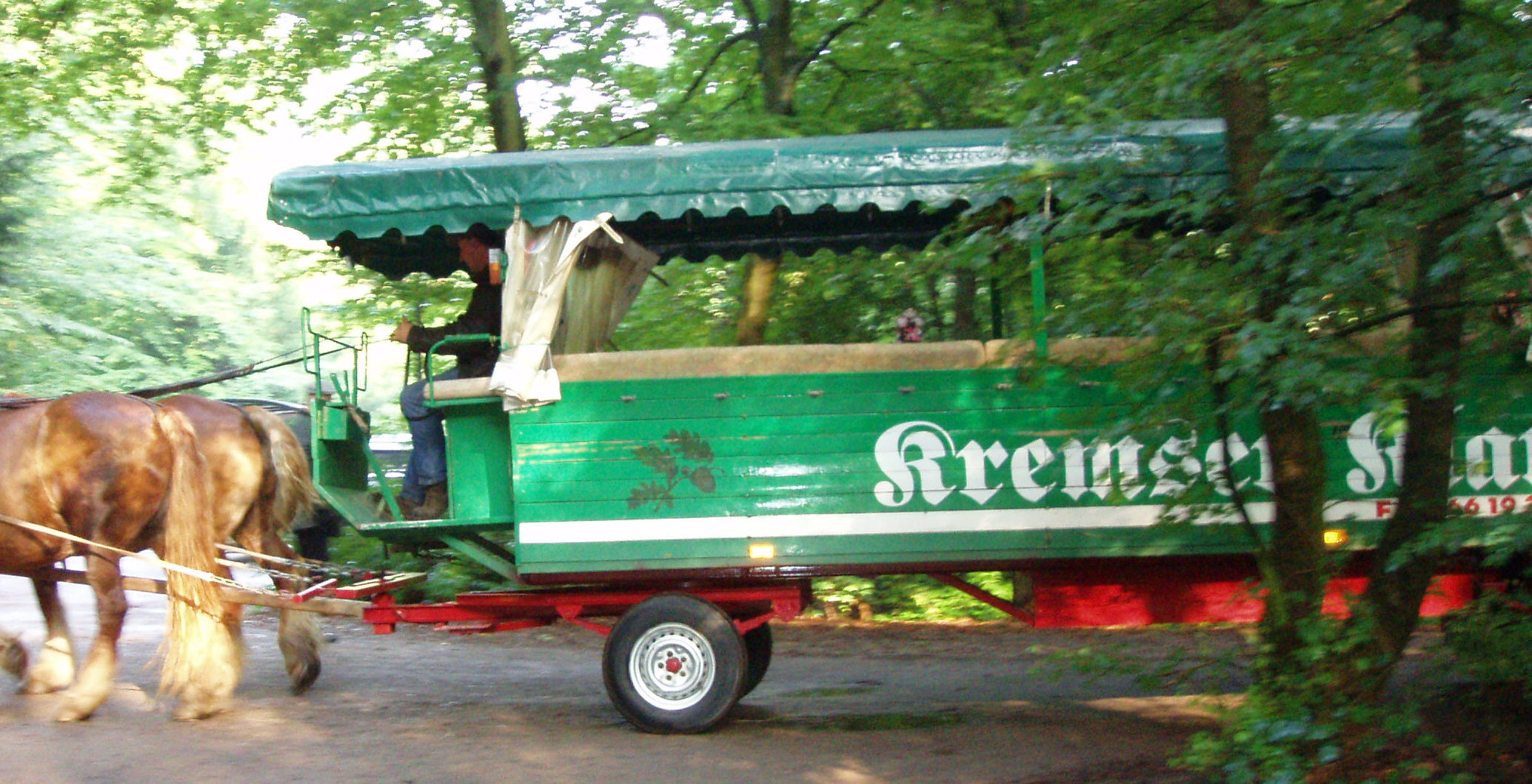
Kremser van used in passenger transport

Bolle reiste jüngst zu Pfingsten (Bolle made a trip on whitsun) is a folk song in the Berlin dialect. The song mocks the stereotype of Berliners as unrestrictedly revelrous.

According to music professor Lukas Richter the song is of the Schwank type common in German-speaking countries (compare to "O du lieber Augustin"). The song makes references to Pankow which was a suburb of Berlin in the middle of the 19th century. At that time it was a common conduct for people from Berlin to board a Kremser van – the Berlin variant of a charabanc – to drive out of town to one of the inns, in the case of this song one of the many around the Schönholzer Heide park that were a popular destination for day-trippers.

The name Bolle (meaning "onion" in Berlin dialect) refers to an indeterminate person, and there is no evidence that it refers to the Berlin merchant Carl Bolle or hairdresser Fritze Bollmann.

As common for a folk song, there are a number of variants in wording and the number of verses. The song is also changed deliberately when used to make a political statement by using the refrain "but whatever happened, Bolle had his fun" (Aber dennoch hat sich Bolle janz köstlich amüsiert).

== Text ==
Bolle reiste jüngst zu Pfingsten,
Nach Pankow war sein Ziel;
Da verlor er seinen Jüngsten
Janz plötzlich im Jewühl;
'Ne volle halbe Stunde
Hat er nach ihm jespürt.
Aber dennoch hat sich Bolle
Janz köstlich amüsiert.

In Pankow jab's keen Essen,
In Pankow jab's keen Bier,
War allet uffjefressen
Von fremden Leuten hier.
Nich' ma' 'ne Butterstulle
Hat man ihm reserviert!
Aber dennoch hat sich Bolle
Janz köstlich amüsiert.

Auf der Schönholzer Heide,
Da jab's 'ne Keilerei,
Und Bolle, jar nich feige,
War mittenmang dabei,
Hat's Messer rausjezogen
Und fünfe massakriert.
Aber dennoch hat sich Bolle
Janz köstlich amüsiert.

Es fing schon an zu tagen,
Als er sein Heim erblickt.
Das Hemd war ohne Kragen,
Das Nasenbein zerknickt,
Das rechte Auge fehlte,
Das linke marmoriert.
Aber dennoch hat sich Bolle
Janz köstlich amüsiert.

Als er nach Haus jekommen,
Da ging's ihm aber schlecht,
Da hat ihn seine Olle
janz mörderisch verdrescht!
'Ne volle halbe Stunde
Hat sie auf ihm poliert.
Aber dennoch hat sich Bolle
Janz köstlich amüsiert.

Und Bolle wollte sterben,
Er hat sich's überlegt:
Er hat sich uff die Schienen
Der Kleinbahn druffjelegt;
Die Kleinbahn hat Verspätung,
Und vierzehn Tage druff,
Da fand man unsern Bolle
Als Dörrjemüse uff.

Und Bolle wurd' begraben,
in einer alten Kist'.
Der Pfarrer sagte 'Amen'
und warf ihn uff 'n Mist.
Die Leute klatschten Beifall,
und gingen dann nach Haus.
Und nun ist die Jeschichte
von uns'rem Bolle aus!

Bolle made a trip on whitsun,
to Pankow he was heading,
arring in the milling crowd,
he lost his youngst at once
a full half hour then
he searched for him around,
but whatever happened
Bolle had his fun.

Pankow had no food,
Pankow had no beer,
it's been all eaten up,
by some folks that were there,
not even bread and butter
had been left for him,
but whatever happened,
Bolle had his fun.

While on the Schönholz parc
a big brawl started right,
and Bolle did not faint
went right into the crowd,
he came to draw his knife
massacred of them five,
but whatever happened,
Bolle had his fun.

Next morning broke already
when he arrived at home
his shirt had not its collar,
his nose had quite a kink,
his left eye looked all missing,
his right eye 's black and blue,
but whatever happened,
Bolle had his fun.

So when he returned back home
he did not look alright,
an so his ol' missus started
to wallop him dead right
a full half hour then
she beaten him along
but whatever happened,
Bolle had his fun.

So Bolle wanted to die,
went to the idea straight,
he lay himself on the tracks
waiting for the Kleinbahn train,
the Kleinbahn was all late,
and a fortnight later,
when Bolle had been found,
he looked like dried fruit does.

So Bolle had a funeral
lay in an old box coffin,
the pastor just said 'amen'
when he dumped the remains,
the people gave applause
before returning home,
and so this Bolle story
has finally to end.

== Melody ==
Source
