= Soviet War Memorial (Vienna) =

Memorial in Landstraße, Austria

- Heldendenkmal der Roten Armee
- Soviet Union
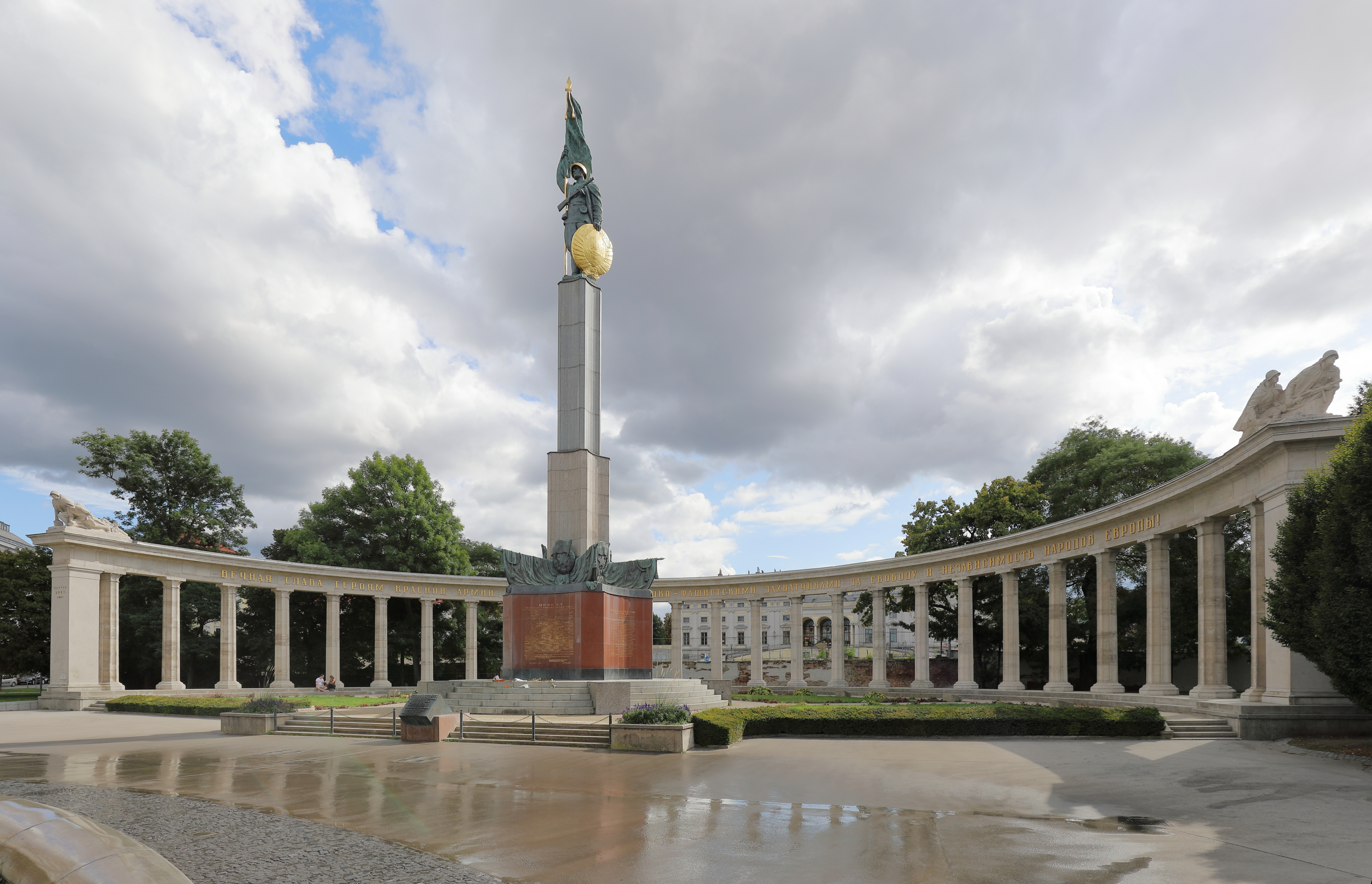
- Soviet War Memorial
- For Soviet war dead of the Vienna offensive
- Unveiled: August 19, 1945
- Location: 48°11′53.27″N 16°22′34.21″E; Vienna, Austria
- Designed by: S. G. Yakovlev
- Commemorated: 17,000
- Вечная слава героям Красной Армии, павшим в боях с немецко-фашистскими захватчиками за свободу и независимость народов Европы; Eternal glory to the heroes of the Red Army, who fell in battle with the German fascist invaders for the freedom and independence of the peoples of Europe

The Soviet War Memorial in Vienna, Austria, more formally known as the Heroes' Monument of the Red Army (German: Heldendenkmal der Roten Armee), is located at Vienna's Schwarzenbergplatz. The semi-circular white marble colonnade partially enclosing a twelve-metre figure of a Soviet soldier was unveiled in 1945. The memorial was built to commemorate the 17,000 Red Army soldiers killed in action during the Vienna offensive in World War II.

== Background ==
Near the end of World War II in Europe, Soviet forces of the 3rd Ukrainian Front were ordered by Joseph Stalin to capture Vienna, both for strategic military purposes and for use as a post-war bargaining chip with the Allies. After intense urban fighting, Vienna was captured by Soviet forces on 14 April 1945.

== Construction and Austrian perception ==
External image
- Additional photos

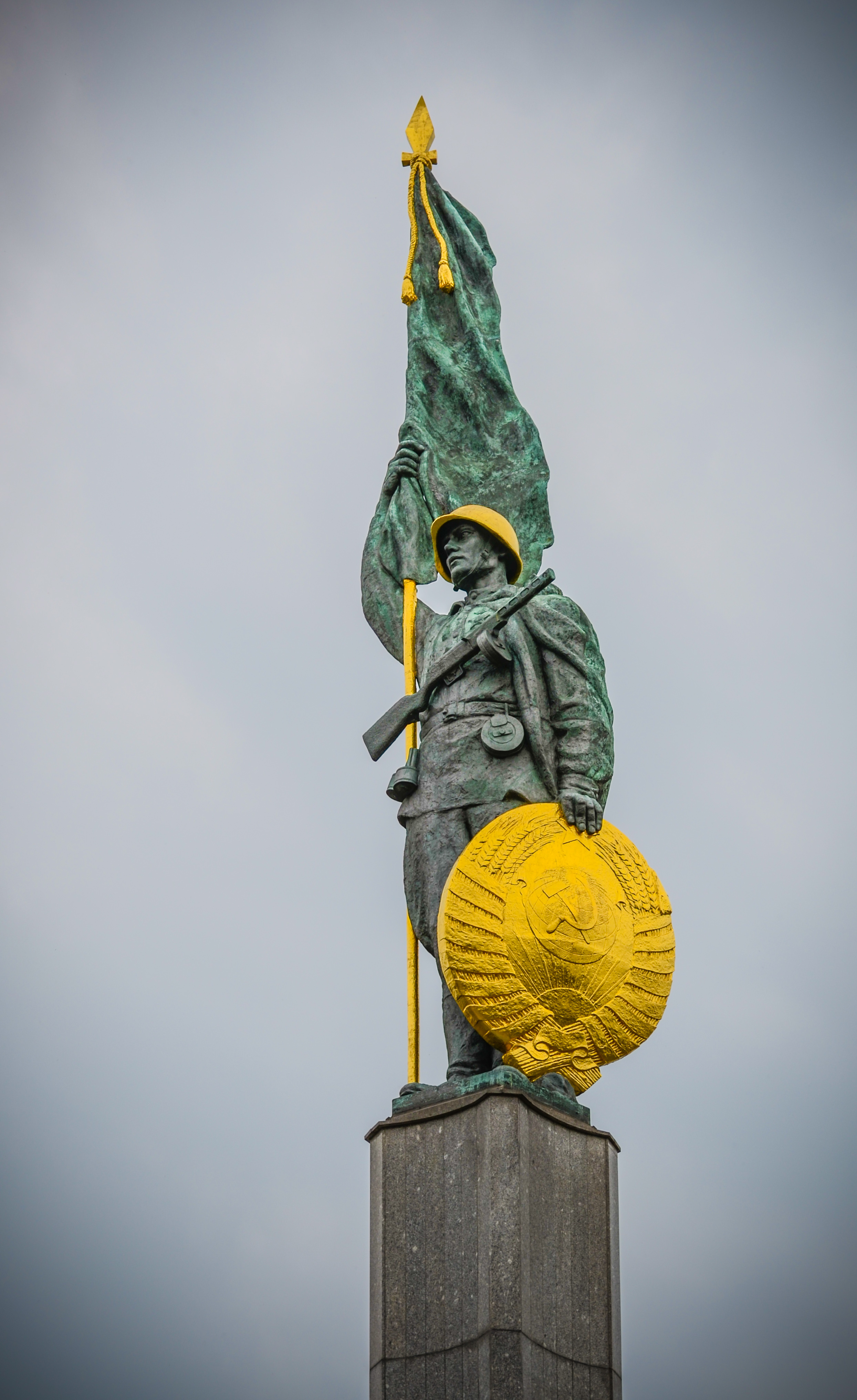
The Red Army soldier depicted carries a PPSh-41 submachine gun and holds a Soviet flag and a golden emblem of the Soviet Union.

The creation of an Allied Commission for Austria was envisaged by Allied leaders at the various sessions of the European Advisory Commission and established by the Agreement on Control Machinery in Austria in London on July 4, 1945. The agreement mandated the creation of four occupation zones (American, British, French and Soviet) in Vienna, similar to the Allied occupation sectors in Berlin. Several sites were considered for the Soviet memorial and a prominent location in the 3rd district near the Palais Schwarzenberg was chosen, imposingly within sight of the location used by the four allies to govern Vienna. German prisoners of war and Austrian construction workers were used to build the 3,000-square-foot (280 m^{2}) site.

The memorial includes a triumphal arch and is dominated by the figure of a soldier with a PPSh-41 submachine gun on his chest. The soldier wears a golden helmet and holds a Soviet flag and a golden emblem of the Soviet Union. (Note: The emblem of the memorial has 17 ribbons, although the real state emblem of the Soviet Union had a maximum of 16 ribbons, as many as there were at most Soviet republics (in the years 1940–1956). In fact, the emblem of the memorial should have only 11 ribbons, as the Soviet War Memorial in Berlin's Tiergarten has and the real Soviet emblem had between 1936 and 1946, i.e. also during World War II.)

Russian president Vladimir Putin visited the memorial in 2007 to lay flowers and specifically give thanks to Austria for maintaining it. The city paid to refurbish the memorial, despite objections from some members of the local press.

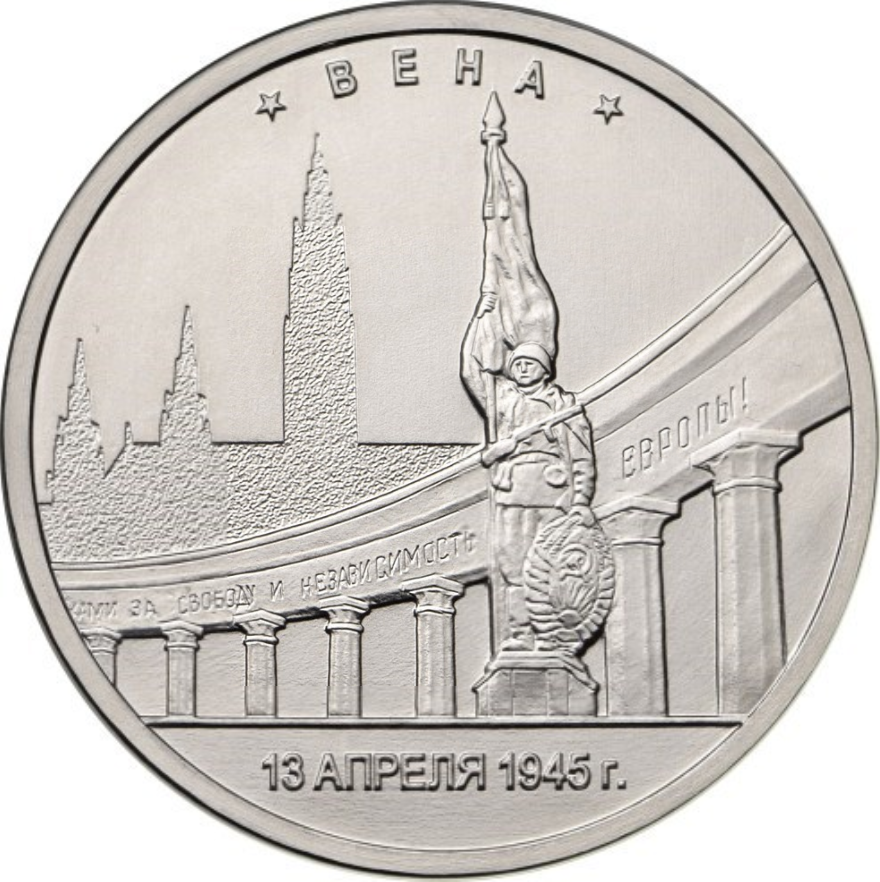
Commemorative coin of the Bank of Russia, issued on August 1, 2016. 5 rubles, steel, reverse. Series: Cities - capitals of states liberated by Soviet troops from the Nazi invaders. Image of the Monument to Soviet soldiers who died during the liberation of Austria from fascism, installed on Schwarzenbergplatz in Vienna, the work of architect S. G. Yakovlev and sculptor M. A. Intezaryan, against the background of contour images of architectural structures of Vienna, below is a horizontal inscription: “APRIL 13, 1945”, at the top along the edge, framed by two five-pointed stars, - the inscription: "VIENNA". Mintage: Moscow Mint (MMD). Artist: A.A. Brynza. Sculptor: E.I. Novikova.

== Vandalism ==
The monument has been increasingly subjected to acts of politically inspired vandalism in the 21st century.

- In April 2012 red paint was thrown over a part of the memorial.
- In May 2014 it was daubed with the colours of the Ukrainian flag during the onset of the Russo-Ukrainian War.
- In February 2015 black paint was poured over an order on the monument from Joseph Stalin congratulating Soviet forces on their victory in the Vienna offensive of 1945.

== Stone tablet text ==
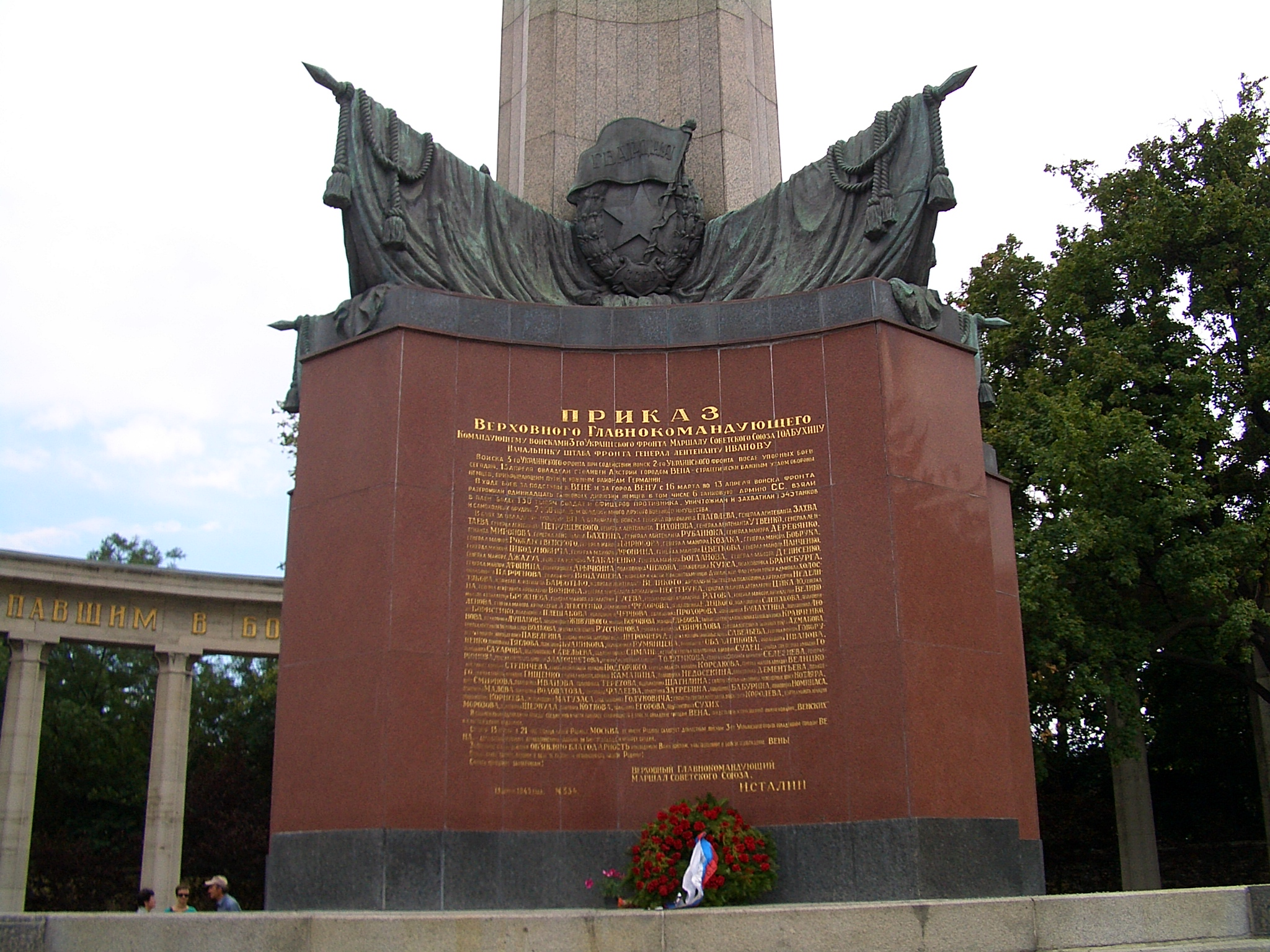
Detail of stone tablet with the text of the order of the Supreme Commander-in-Chief I.V. Stalin in connection with the capture of Vienna on April 13, 1945.

The text of the stone tablet in front of the monument begins:

Monument to the soldiers of the Soviet Army, who have fallen for the liberation of Austria from fascism..

== See also ==
- Soviet War Memorial (Treptower Park)
- Soviet War Memorial (Tiergarten)
- Soviet War Memorial (Schönholzer Heide)
