= Soviet War Memorial (Tiergarten) =

War memorial in Berlin

- Berlin
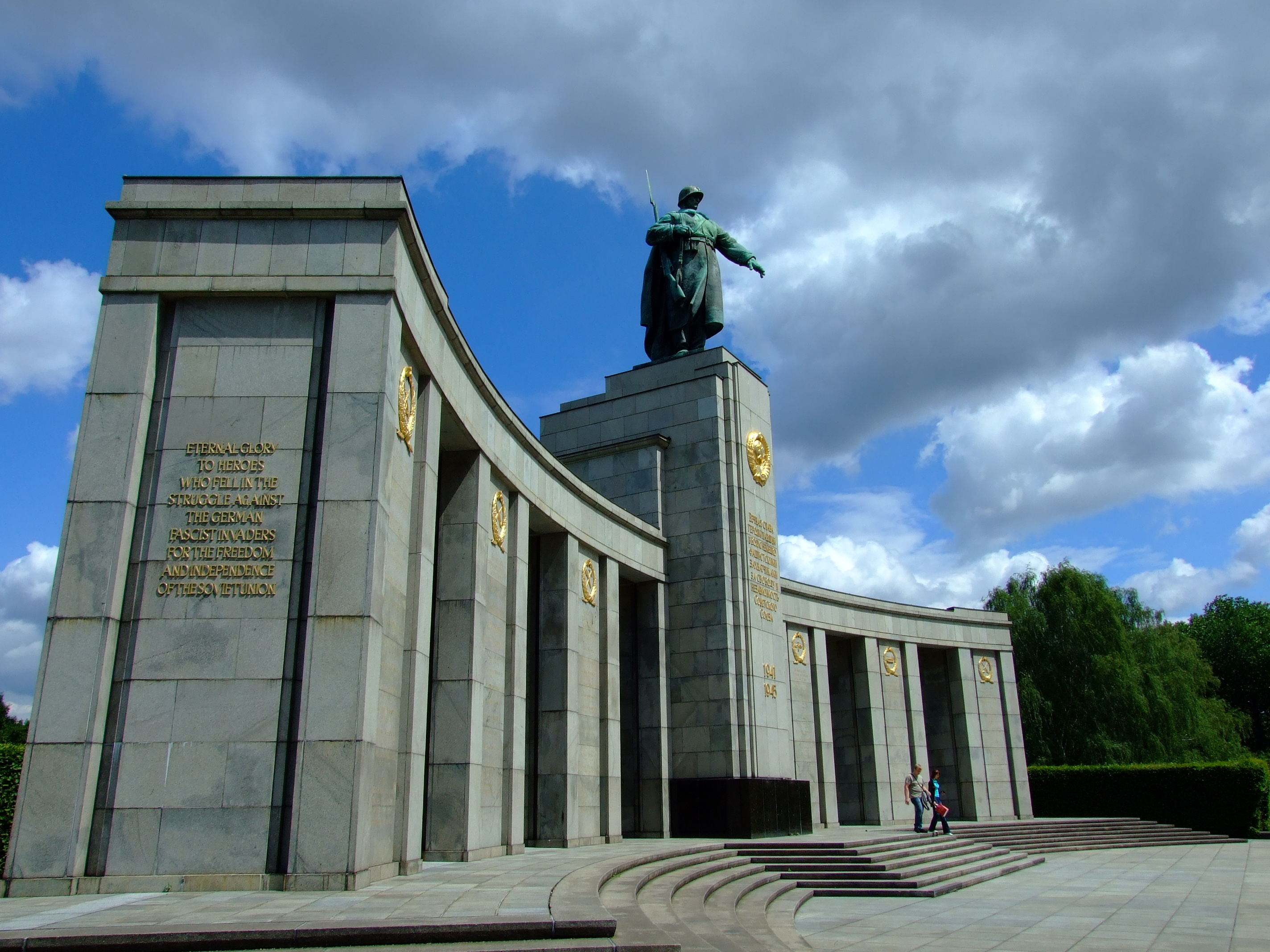
- Detail of memorial
- For Soviet war dead of the Battle of Berlin
- Unveiled: November 11, 1945
- Location: 52°31′00″N 13°22′20″E; Berlin
- Designed by: Mikhail Gorvits
- Вечная слава героям павшим в боях с немецко фашистскими захватчиками за свободу и независимость Советского Союза; Eternal glory to heroes who fell in battle with the German fascist invaders for the freedom and independence of the Soviet Union

The Soviet War Memorial (German: Sowjetisches Kriegerdenkmal) is one of several war memorials in Berlin, the capital city of Germany, erected by the Soviet Union to commemorate its war dead, particularly the 80,000 soldiers of the Soviet Armed Forces who died during the Battle of Berlin in April and May 1945.

The memorial is located in the Großer Tiergarten, a large public park to the west of the city centre, on the north side of the east–west Straße des 17. Juni (17 June Street) in the Tiergarten locality.

== Site ==
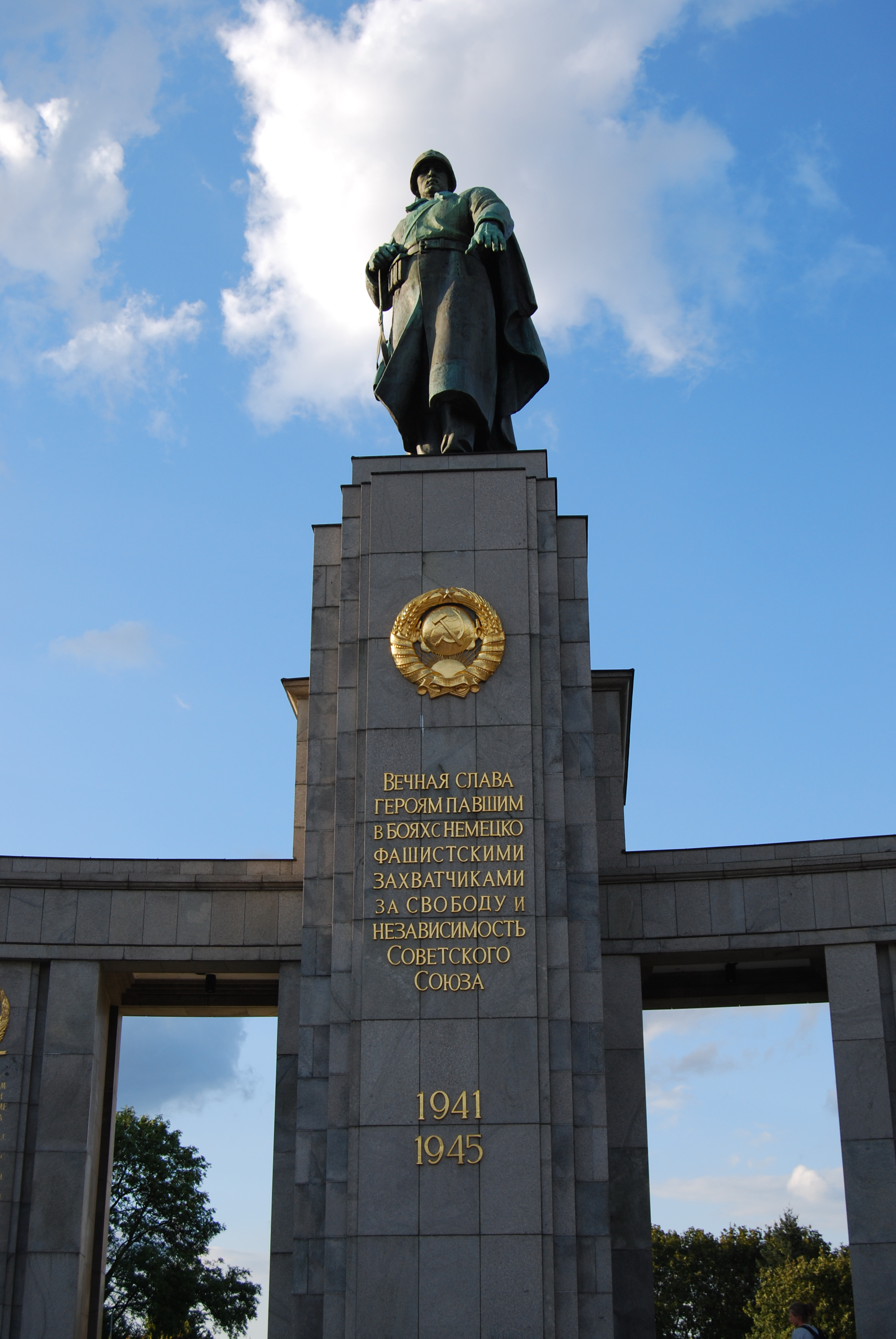
Russian inscription of the Soviet victory on the central column of the memorial

The memorial was erected in 1945, a few months after the capture of the city. Early photographs show the memorial standing in a wilderness of ruins, the Tiergarten having been destroyed by incendiary bombs and then stripped of timber for firewood during the last months of the war. Today, it is surrounded by the extensive woodlands of the reconstituted Tiergarten. Although the memorial stood in the British sector of Berlin, its construction was supported by all of the Allied Powers. Throughout the Cold War, Soviet 6th Separate Guards Motor Rifle Brigade honor guards from East Berlin were sent to stand watch at the memorial.

== Design ==
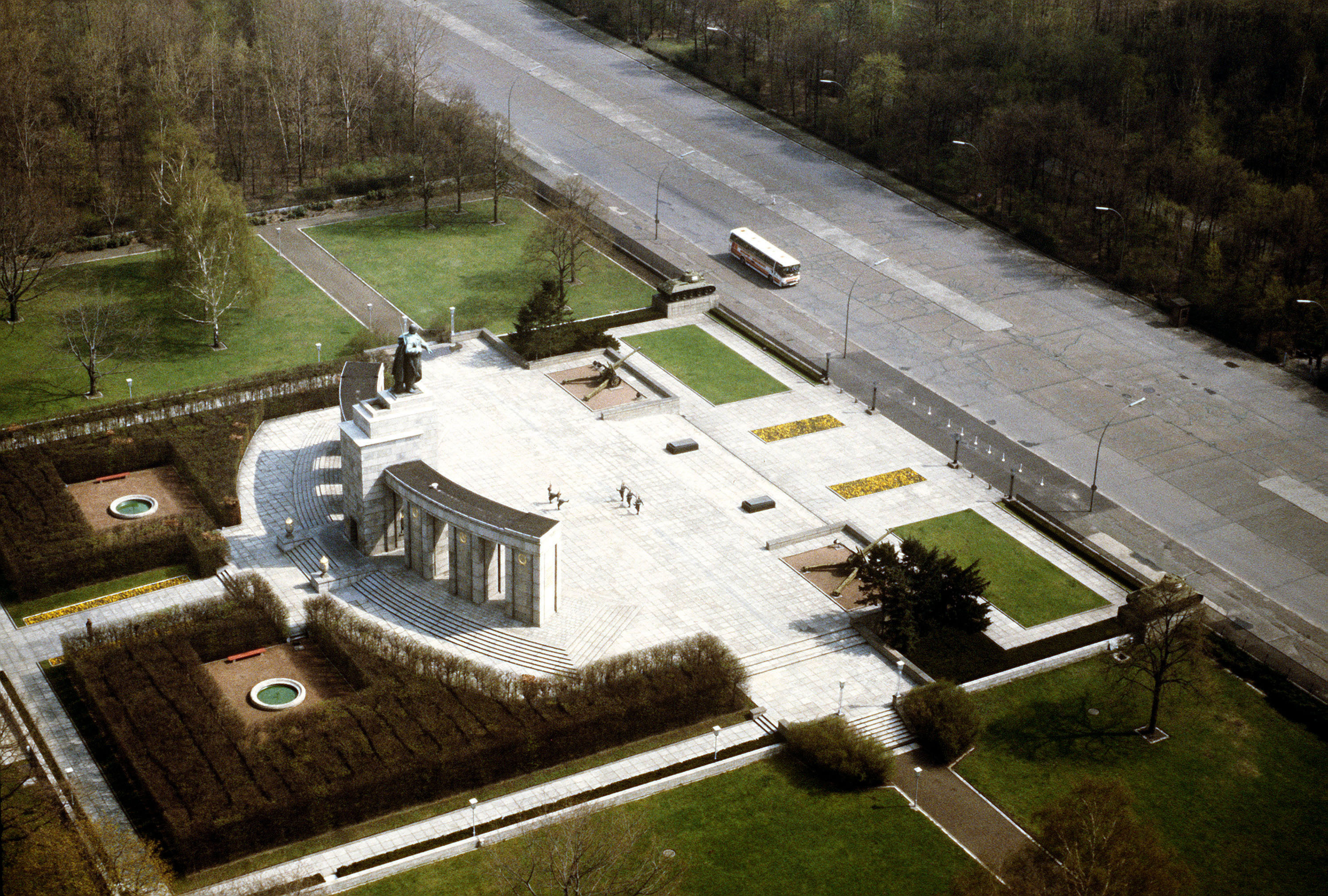
Aerial view of the memorial with honor guards, West Berlin, 1983

The memorial was built from stonework taken from the destroyed Reich Chancellery. Built in a style similar to other Soviet World War II monuments that were once found all over the former Eastern Bloc, the memorial takes the form of a curved stoa topped by a large statue of a Soviet soldier. It is set in landscaped gardens and flanked by two Red Army ML-20 152mm howitzer-gun artillery pieces and two T-34 tanks. Behind the memorial is an outdoor museum showing photographs of the memorial's construction and giving a guide to other memorials in the Berlin area.

A large inscription in Russian is written underneath the soldier statue, which is translated as "Eternal glory to heroes who fell in battle with the German fascist invaders for the freedom and independence of the Soviet Union". The Soviets built the statue with the soldier's arm stretching over the graves of more than 2,000 soldiers.

The memorial was designed by architect Mikhail Gorvits, and the monument of the Soviet soldier was designed by sculptors Vladimir Tsigal and Lev Kerbel.

== The memorial today ==
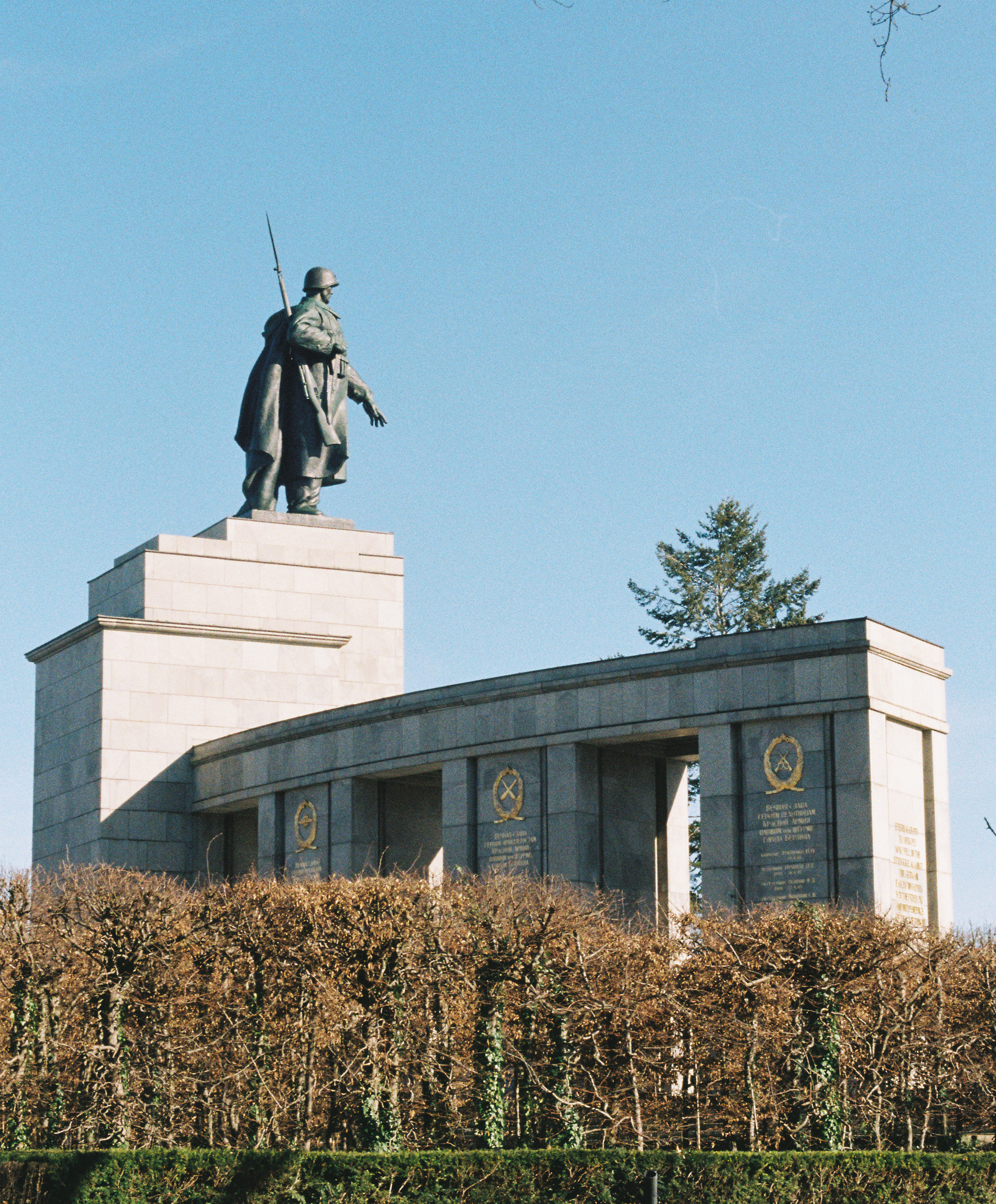
Side view of the memorial, Berlin, 2023

The memorial is still a site of active commemoration. On the anniversary of VE Day (8 May), wreath-laying ceremonies are held at the memorial. It is a site of pilgrimage for war veterans from the countries of the former Soviet Union. It is also a popular tourist attraction since it is much closer to the centre of the city than the larger Soviet war memorial at Treptower Park. The memorial is maintained by the City of Berlin.

There is a sign next to the monument explaining in English, German, and Russian that this is the burial site of more than 2,000 fallen Soviet soldiers. It is located in the heart of Berlin along one of the major roads with a clear sight of the Reichstag and the Brandenburg Gate, both symbols of the city. Some of the marble used to build it came from destroyed government buildings nearby, and it is located where Adolf Hitler planned to build Welthauptstadt Germania - more specifically it is where the east-west axis would intersect with the north south axis. Besides the main inscription, the columns also include names of some of the dead Heroes of the Soviet Union buried there.

The monument was built in the British sector of West Berlin. After the Berlin Wall was erected in 1961, the monument was seen as a sign of communist provocation on West Berlin soil and had to be protected from West Berliners by British Army Berlin Infantry Brigade soldiers. In 1970, neo-Nazi Ekkehard Weil shot and severely wounded one of the Soviet honour guards at the monument. In 2010, the monument was vandalized just before Victory in Europe Day celebrations with red graffiti that read "thieves, murderers, rapists", sparking a protest from the Russian Embassy in Berlin that accused German authorities of not taking sufficient measures to protect the monument. The German tabloid Bild launched a Bundestag-petition to remove the Soviet tanks from the memorial site as a response to the annexation of Crimea by the Russian Federation in 2014, calling them a "martial war symbol". The petition was subsequently denied by the German federal government, which iterated that it would honor the 1990 Treaty on the Final Settlement with Respect to Germany requiring it to maintain Soviet war memorials.

== In popular culture ==
The monument is featured in the 1989 Cold War thriller The Package.

The monument and its tanks are a background feature of Rory's jet-lagged run in Tom Hanks' short story "A Junket in the City of Light".

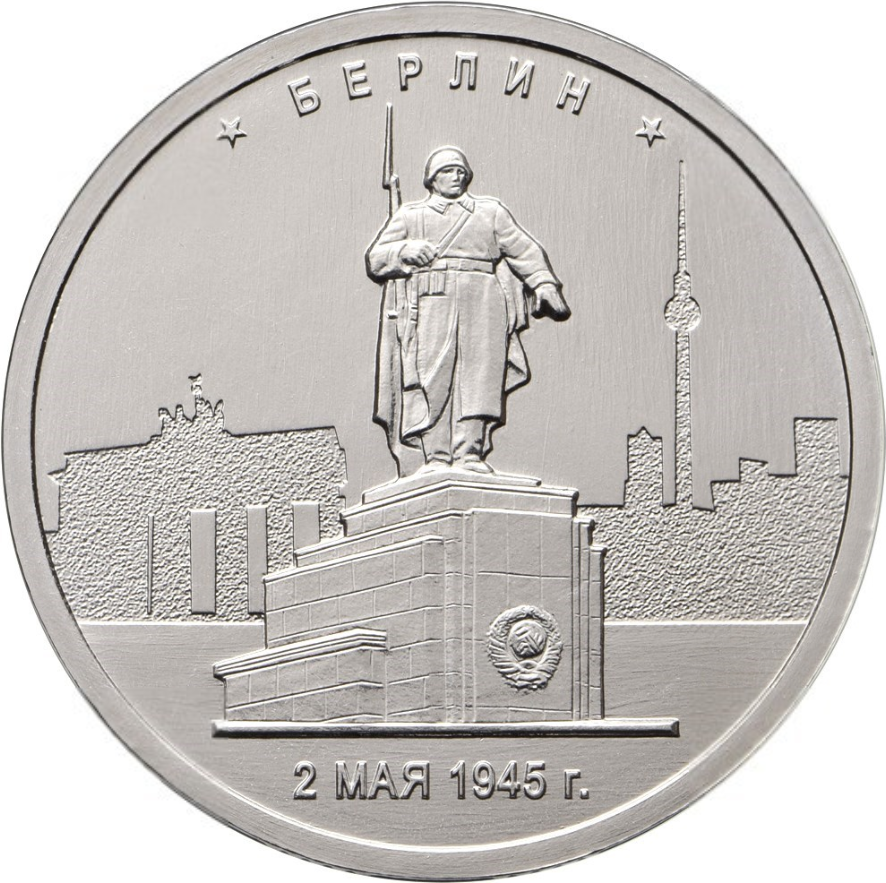
A Bank of Russia commemorative coin issued on August 1, 2016. 5 rubles, steel, reverse Series: Capital Cities Liberated from Nazi Invaders by Soviet Troops A fragment of the memorial to fallen Soviet soldiers, located in the Grosser Tiergarten park in Berlin, designed by architect N.V. Sergievsky and sculptors L.E. Kerbel and V.E. Tsigal, 1945, against a background of outline images of Berlin's architectural structures. At the bottom is the horizontal inscription: "2 MAY 1945." At the top, along the rim, framed by two five-pointed stars, is the inscription: "BERLIN." Minded by: Moscow Mint (MMD). Artist: A.A. Brynza. Sculptor: A.N. Bessonov.

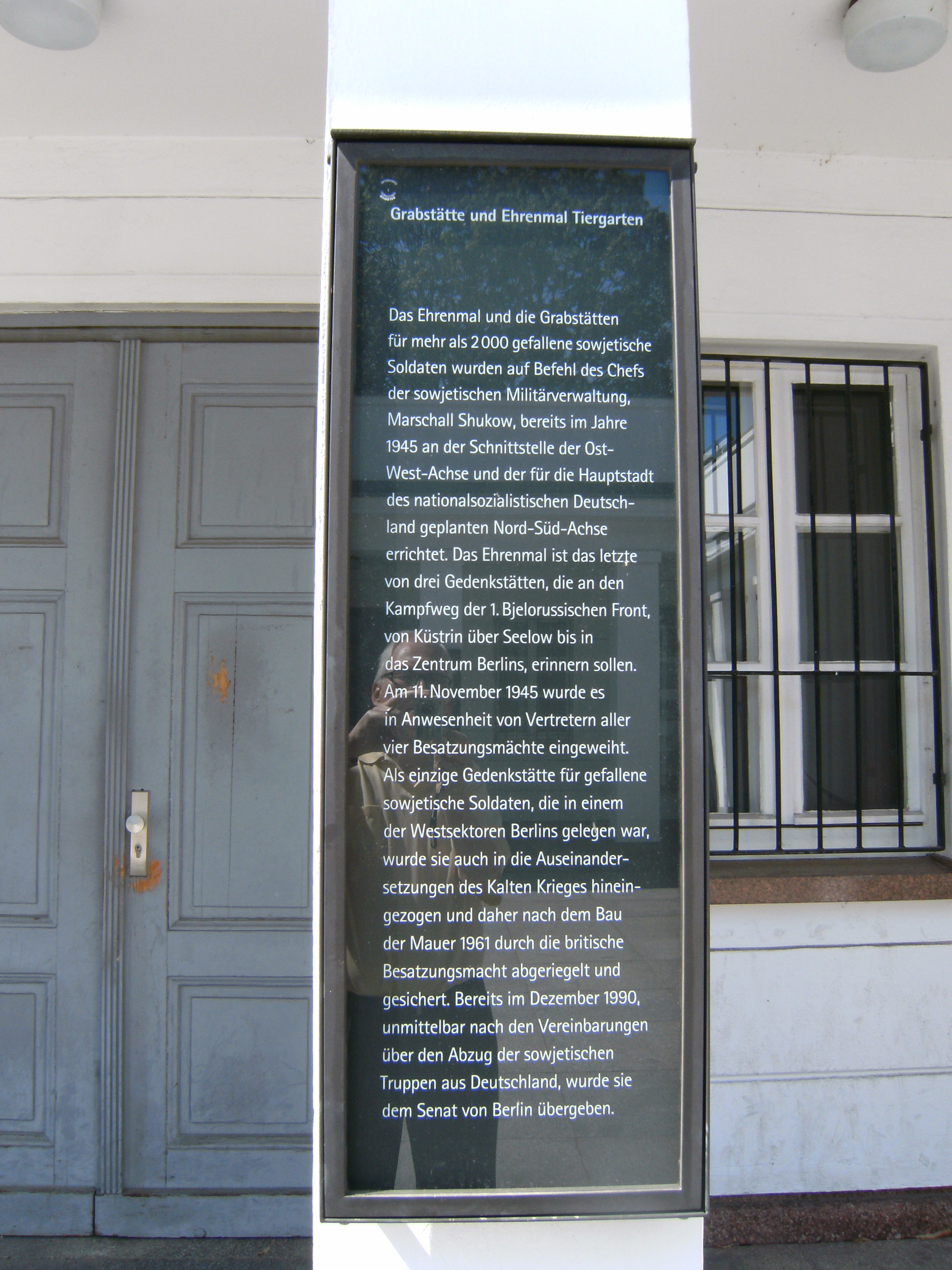
Soviet War Memorial (Tiergarten) in Berlin: Plaque in the small building behind the memorial explaining the historical background. The text translated into english says: Tiergarten Memorial and Cemetery The memorial and graves for more than 2,000 fallen Soviet soldiers were erected in 1945 on the orders of Marshal Zhukov, head of the Soviet military administration, at the intersection of the East-West Axis and the North-South Axis planned for the capital of Nazi Germany. The memorial is the last of three memorials intended to commemorate the battle route of the 1st Belorussian Front, from Küstrin via Seelow to the center of Berlin. It was inaugurated on November 11, 1945, in the presence of representatives of all four occupying powers. As the only memorial for fallen Soviet soldiers located in one of the western sectors of Berlin, it was also drawn into the conflicts of the Cold War and was therefore sealed off and secured by the British occupying forces after the construction of the Berlin Wall in 1961 It was handed over to the Senate of Berlin as early as December 1990, immediately after the agreements on the withdrawal of Soviet troops from Germany. German: Soviet War Memorial (Tiergarten) in Berlin: Plaque with history of its creation in the small building behind the memorial.

== See also ==
- Soviet War Memorial (Vienna)
- Soviet War Memorial (Schönholzer Heide)
- List of tourist attractions in Berlin
