= Schwarzenbergplatz =

Square in Vienna, Austria

Coordinates: 48°11′55″N 16°22′34″E

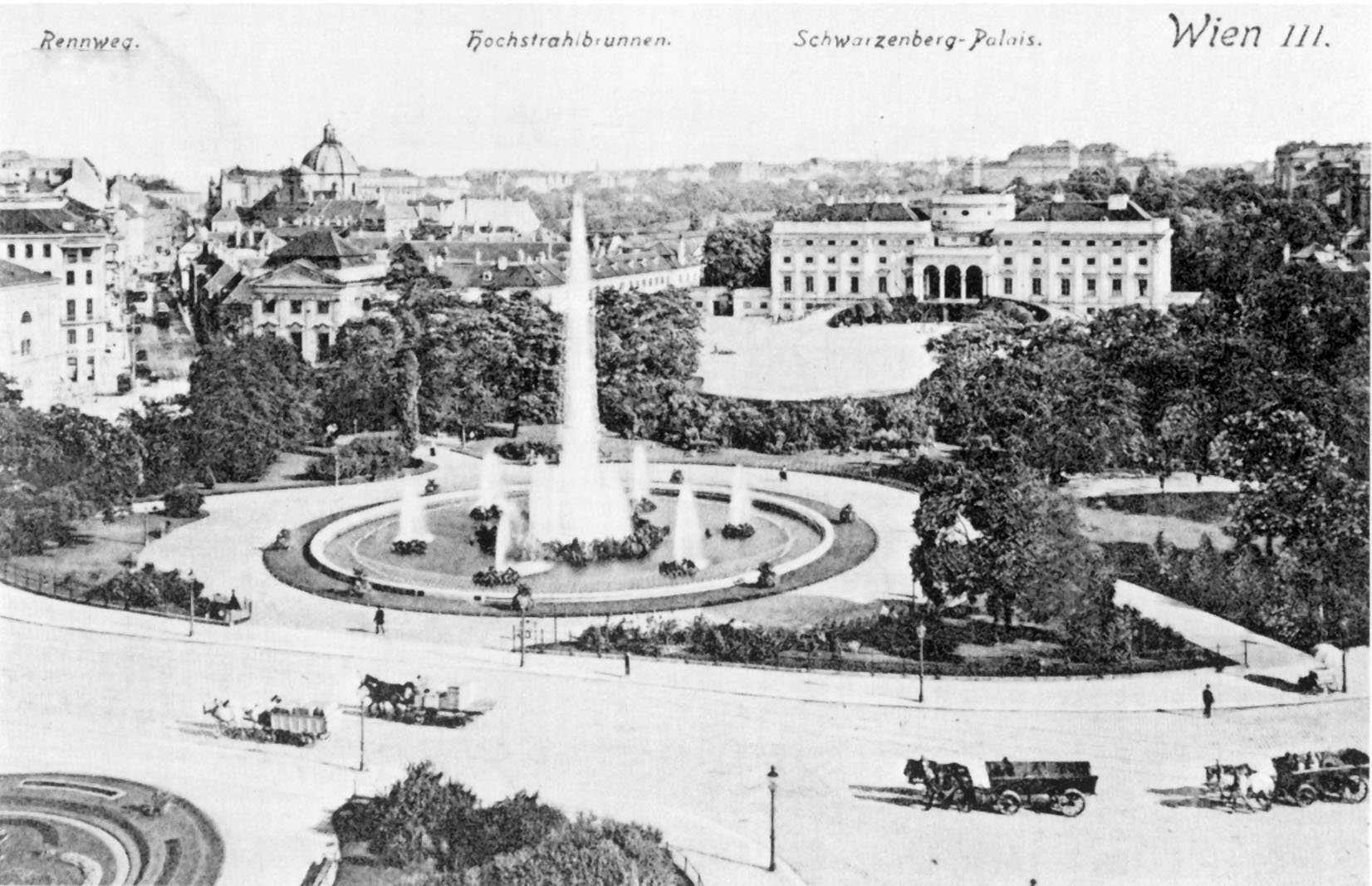
Schwarzenbergplatz in 1905 with the Hochstrahlbrunnen (fountain) and, in the background, the Schwarzenberg Palace.

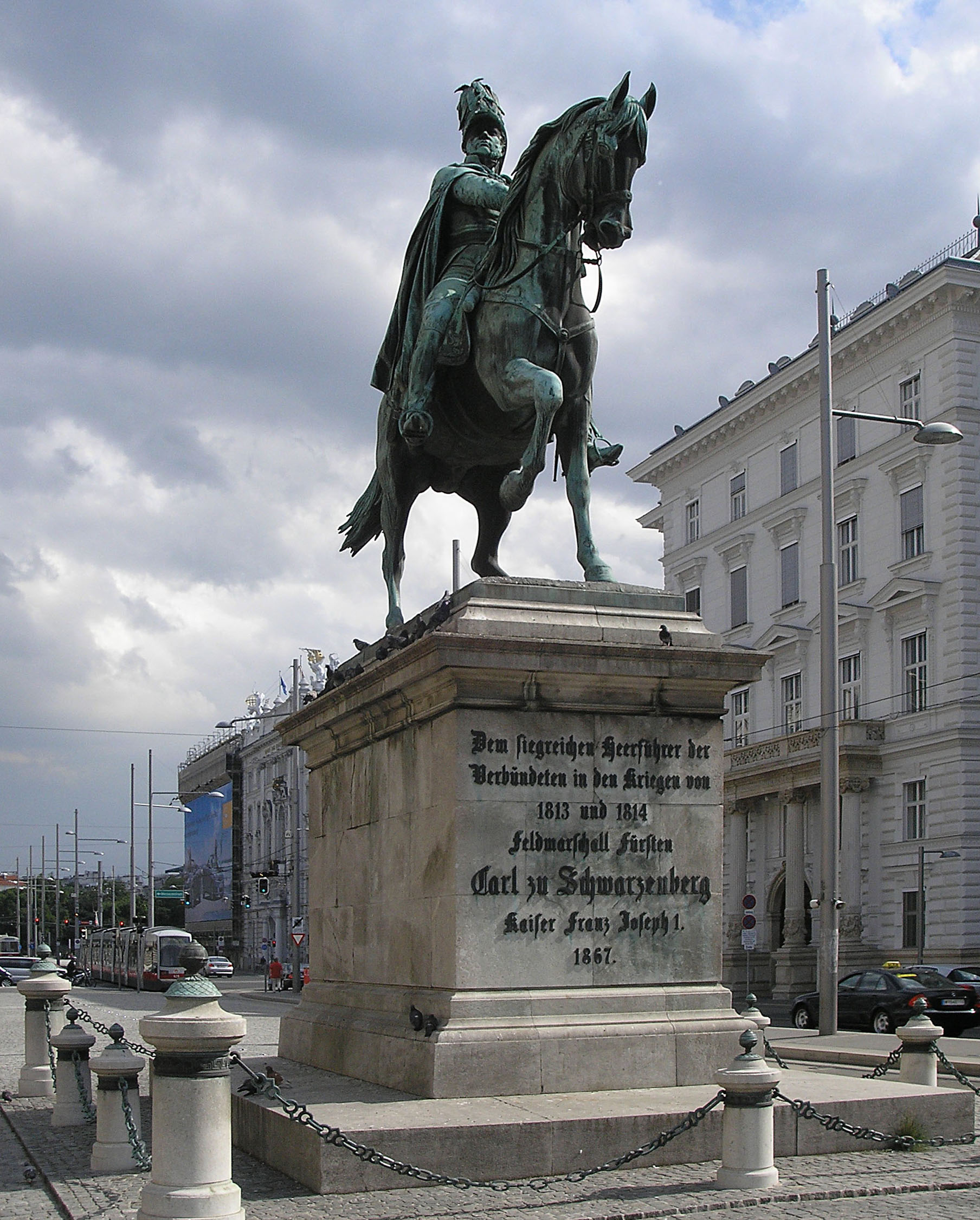
Schwarzenberg Monument.

Schwarzenbergplatz is a square in Vienna, Austria in both the 3rd and 4th district. It is closer to a small, open street rather than a square. It runs between the Kärntner Ring section of the Ringstraße and Lothringerstraße. Travelling south, the street, Schwarzenbergstraße, becomes Schwarzenbergplatz after passing Kärntner Ring.

Schwarzenbergplatz then continues briefly until it becomes Rennweg Straße as it passes by the large enclosed parks of Belvedere-Garten and the Palais Schwarzenberg, and the Schwarzenberggarten to the west. A large equestrian statue of Austrian field marshal Karl Philipp, Prince of Schwarzenberg, who fought with distinction in the Napoleonic Wars, is on display.

== History ==
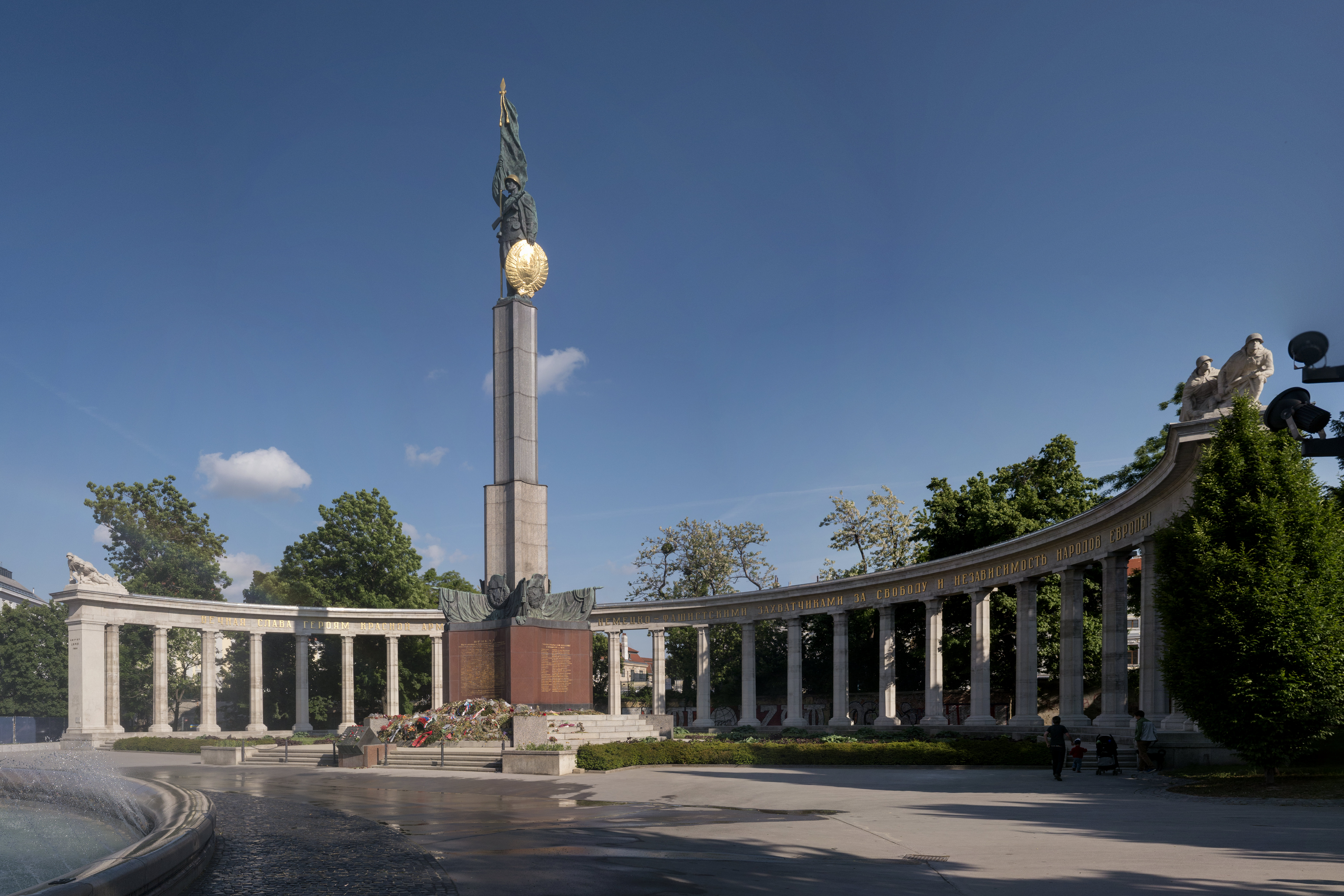
Soviet War Memorial.

Until the mid-19th century, most of the area of today's Schwarzenberg square was occupied by Vienna's city walls. After the demolition of the city walls in the years from 1858 to 1863, these areas were now available for construction and, similar to the Ringstraßenpalais, magnificent buildings were constructed here in the second half of the 19th century.

In 1861, Emperor Franz Joseph I ordered the construction of the Schwarzenberg Monument to commemorate the victorious commander of the 1813 Battle of Leipzig, Karl Philipp, Prince of Schwarzenberg. The equestrian statue was created by Ernst Hähnel and completed in October, 1867.

Franz Joseph I witnessed the commemoration ceremony of the First Vienna Mountain Spring Pipeline, on 23 October 1873 in front of the Palais Schwarzenberg (in an area that was not yet considered part of Schwarzenberg Platz).

In August 1945, immediately after the end of World War II, the Soviet military and Austrian officials revealed the "Heroes' Monument of the Red Army" (now popularly referred to as the "Russian Monument") behind the Hochstrahlbrunnen fountain. Until 1955, a Soviet T-34 tank was placed there. During the occupation, the southern part of square was renamed Stalin Square on 12 April 1946, and this name was officially effective until 18 July 1956. The "Haus der Industrie" (House of Industry), then No. 4 Stalin Square, was the seat of the Allied Council of the four occupying powers until 1955.

In 1977, McDonald's opened its first store in Austria at Schwarzenbergplatz.

In 2003 and 2004, the Schwarzenberg Square was re-designed by Spanish architect Alfredo Arribas and equipped with sunken lighting elements representing different lighting effects. In the course of restructuring, the few green spaces that had existed until then were removed, a matter of much public criticism. There was particularly strong opposition to the replacement of the largely still-existing slim light poles from 1904 by lighting fixtures that were perceived by critics as clumsy and clunky.

Under the Schwarzenberg Square courses the Wien River and the underground line U4, and it was also once the location for the "Zwingburg", a shelter for homeless people who retreated into the Viennese sewers.
