= Volkspark Schönholzer Heide =

Forested urban park with Soviet war memorial in Berlin Pankow

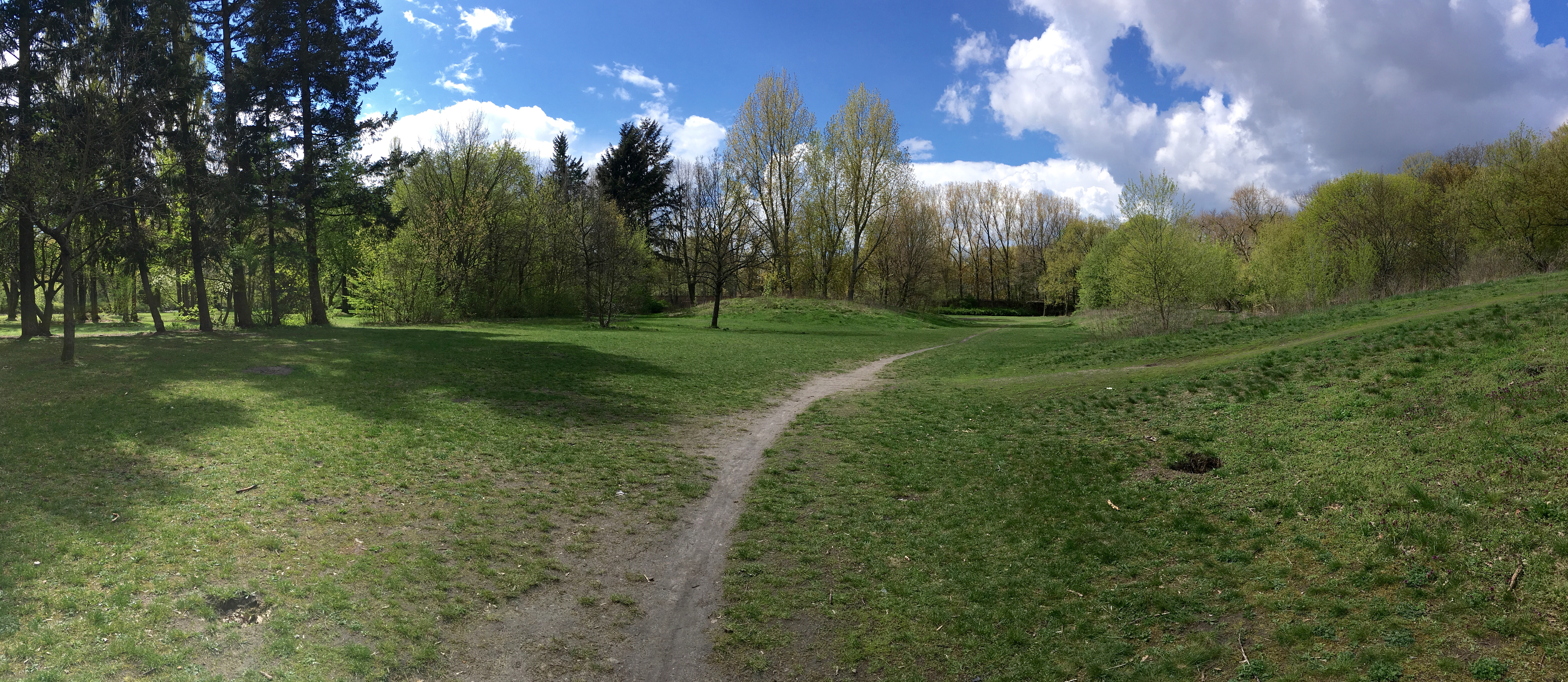
- Berlin - Schönholzer Heide
- Interactive map of Volkspark Schönholzer Heide
- Type: Urban forest park
- Location: Niederschönhausen, Pankow, Berlin, Germany
- Coordinates: 52°34′46″N 13°22′35″E
- Area: 35 hectares (86 acres)
- Created: 18th–20th centuries (gradual development)
- Operator: Borough of Pankow
- Status: Open all year
- Designation: Listed memorial complex (Soviet war memorial) and protected green space
- Public transit: S Schönholz; bus services

Volkspark Schönholzer Heide is a largely wooded urban park in the Pankow borough of Berlin, Germany. Covering roughly 35 hectares, it preserves part of a historic woodland once known as the Schönhauser Fichten (Spruce woods of Schönhausen). The park’s north-western corner contains the Soviet War Memorial (Schönholzer Heide), one of Berlin’s three major Soviet war memorials, constructed between 1947-1949 and serving as a military cemetery for more than 13,000 Red Army soldiers.

== History ==
=== Royal plantation and early settlement (18th–19th centuries) ===
In the early 1750s, Queen Elisabeth Christine acquired land near today’s park while residing at nearby Schönhausen Palace and laid out a combined pleasure and utility plantation of about 35 hectares, including fruit and mulberry trees for sericulture (Königin-Plantage). In 1763, she settled twelve weaving families on the margins of the estate, shaping the later toponym Schönholz that came into use by 1791.

=== Emergence as leisure ground and Luna Park (late 19th–1930s) ===
As Berlin expanded, local civic groups campaigned to preserve the woodland from speculative subdivision. By the early 20th century the area had restaurants, sports grounds and a sledding hill built from subway excavation spoil (1927/28). In 1936 showmen opened the amusement park Traumland (often called Luna-Park), with attractions such as a Ferris wheel and the "Himalayabahn" roller-coaster.

=== Forced labour site and wartime burials (1940–1945) ===
From 1940 the former amusement grounds were converted into the Luna-Lager, at times the second largest forced labour camp within Berlin, housing foreign civilian workers deployed to nearby arms and electrical factories (including Deutsche Waffen- und Munitionsfabriken and Bergmann-Elektrizitätswerke; English: German Weapons and Munitions Factories and Bergmann Electric Works). A surviving "Luna bunker" structure is still on site. During heavy air raids and the Battle of Berlin, emergency burial grounds (Städtischer Friedhof Pankow VI) were laid out north of today's Hermann-Hesse-Straße to bomb victims and war dead.

=== Soviet war memorial and post war context (1947–1989) ===
Between May 1947 and November 1949 a monumental Soviet memorial and cemetery complex was constructed in the park’s northwest by a team of Soviet architects and sculptors; it commemorates more than 13,000 soldiers and includes a 33.5-metre obelisk and the "mourning mother" sculpture. The memorial is one of Berlin's three main Soviet memorials (with Tiergarten and Treptower Park) and was thoroughly restored between 2011 and 2013 with federal funds (≈ €10 million). Due to its proximity to the border after 1961 and disrupted S-Bahn links, visitor numbers to the park declined in the GDR period.

=== After reunification ===
Following 1990, the park regained importance as a local green space. A nature trail was established and the memorial's interpretation and maintenance became topics of public debate and periodic ceremonies. In June 2023, the Pankow borough publicly discussed contextualisation of the Stalin quotation at the memorial; wreath laying ceremonies on or around 8 May continue happening. In May 2025, the Berliner Morgenpost reported on the history and surviving bunker of the Luna Lager within the park.

== Features ==
=== Landscape and recreation ===
The Schönholzer Heide retains a predominantly natural woodland character with rolling terrain, open lawns, playground and sports field, and a marked Naturlehrpfad (nature trail).

=== Memorials and cemeteries ===
The Soviet War Memorial (Schönholzer Heide) comprises an obelisk, sculptural groups, arcades with 100 bronze name plaques, and eight underground burial chambers; it serves as a military cemetery and protected memorial site. A surviving bunker from the wartime forced labour camp is marked by a memorial plaque installed by the Museum Pankow in 2024.

== Access ==
The park lies between Hermann-Hesse-Straße and the railway lines of the Berlin Northern Railway. Access is possible via S-Bahn Schönholz and local bus routes; bicycle and pedestrian paths traverse the grounds.

== Gallery ==
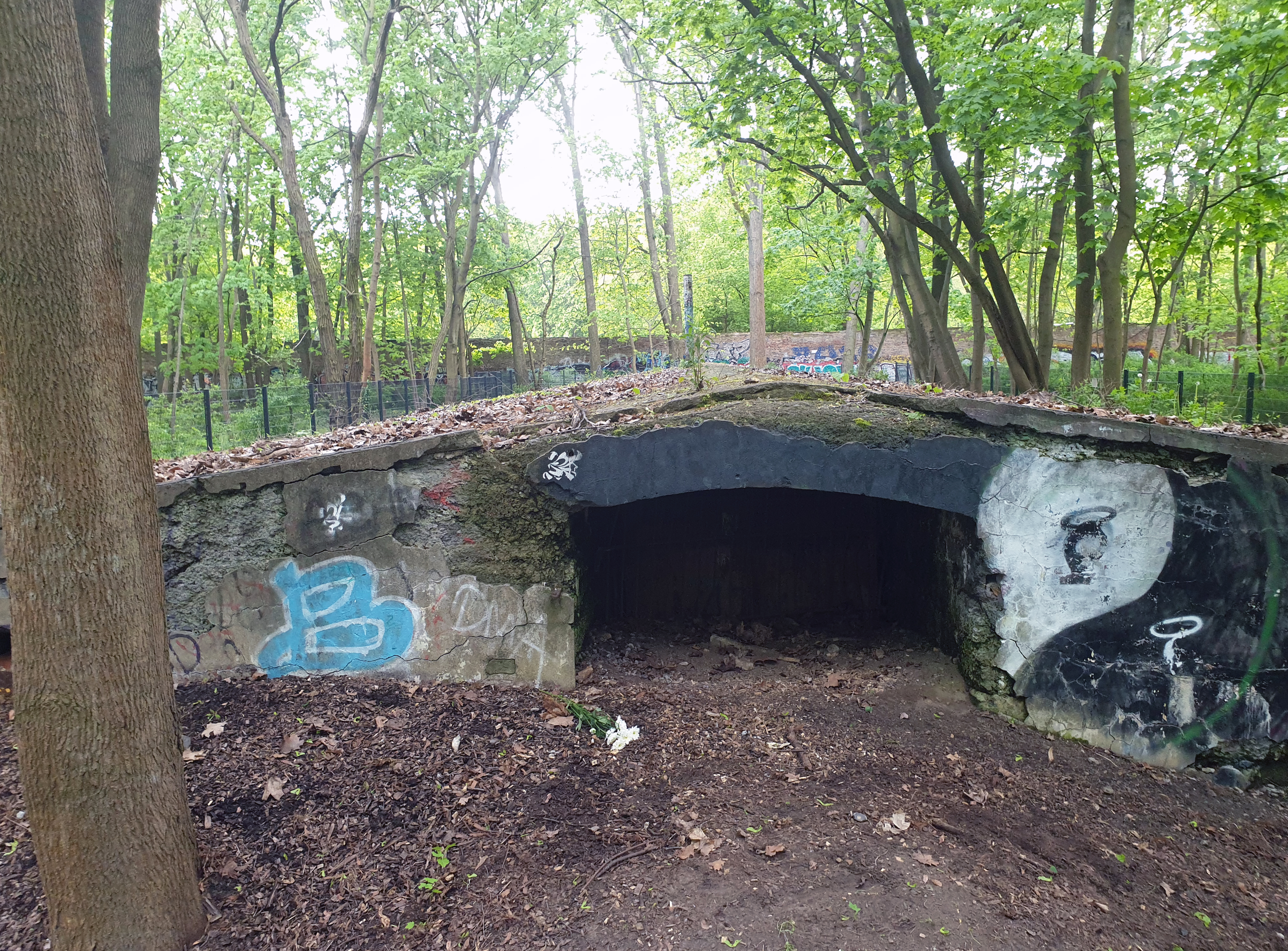
Memorial at the Hermann-Hesse-Street 80.

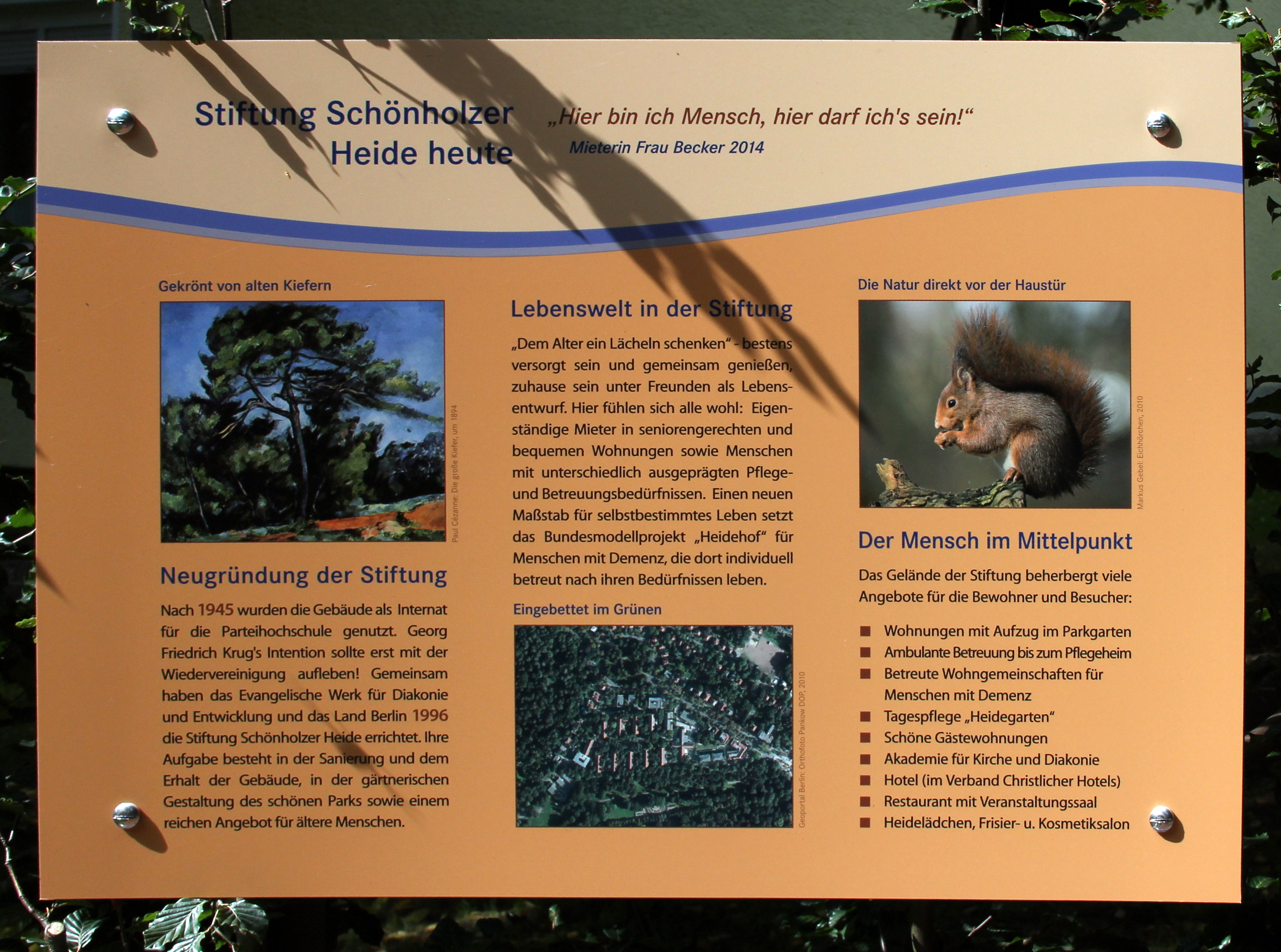
Commemorative plaque at the Leonhard-Frank-Street 10.

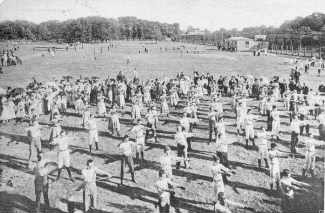
Athletes on the sports field in Schönholzer Heide; around 1900.

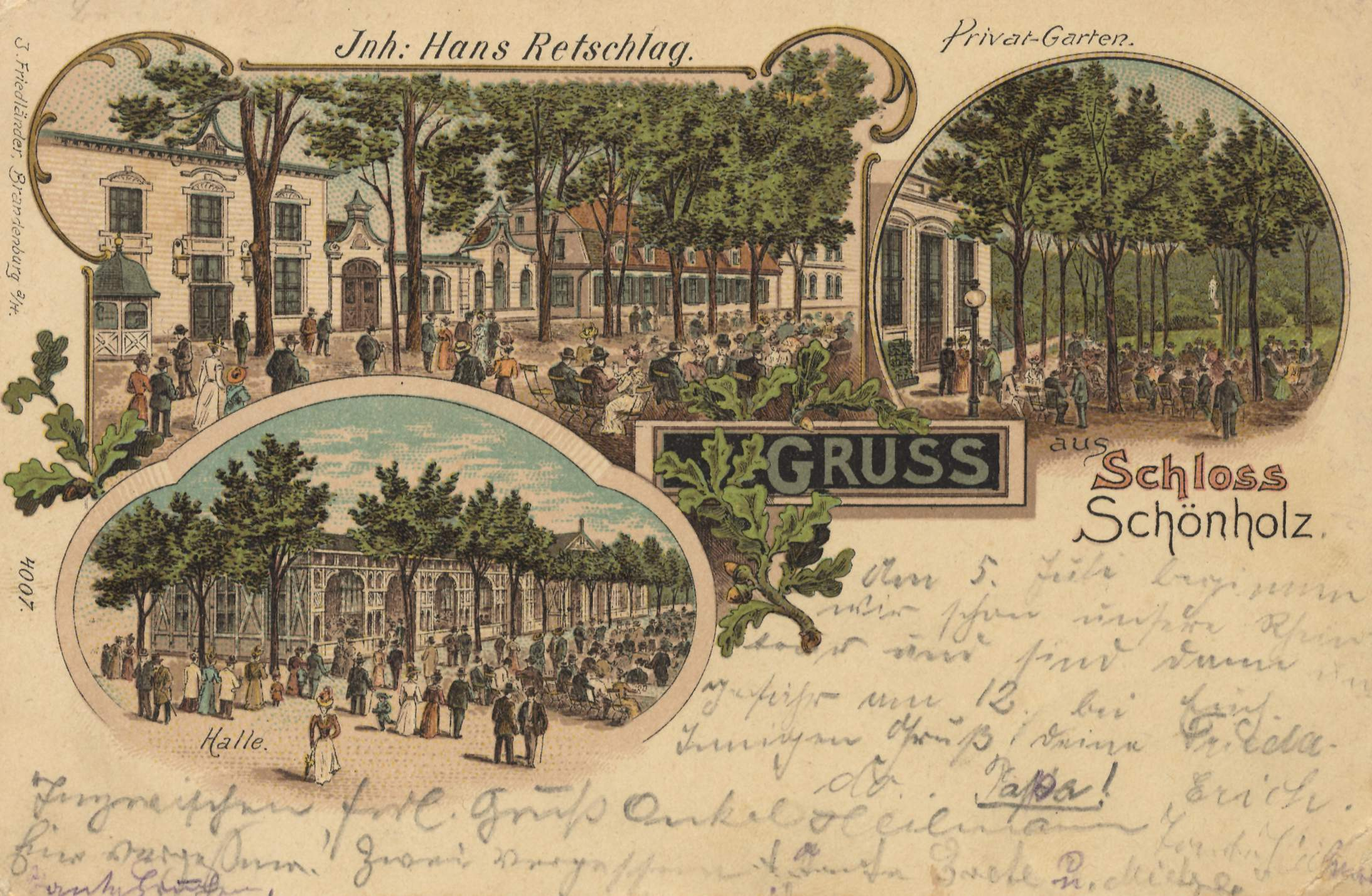
Picture postcard of the Schönholz castle.
