= Soviet War Memorial (Schönholzer Heide) =

Cemetery in Pankow, Berlin

Coordinates: 52°34′54″N 13°22′21″E

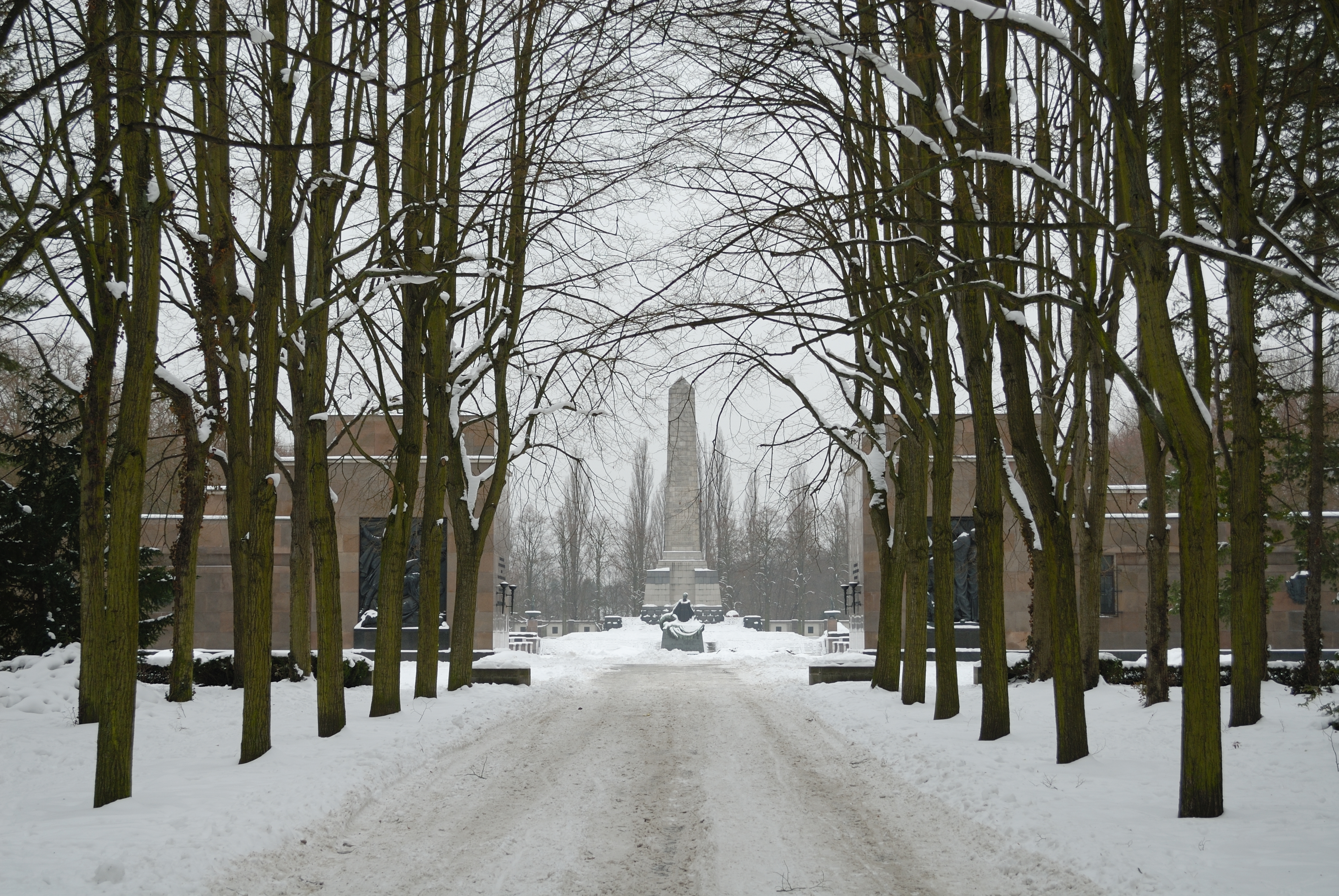
The Soviet Cemetery Pankow in January 2010

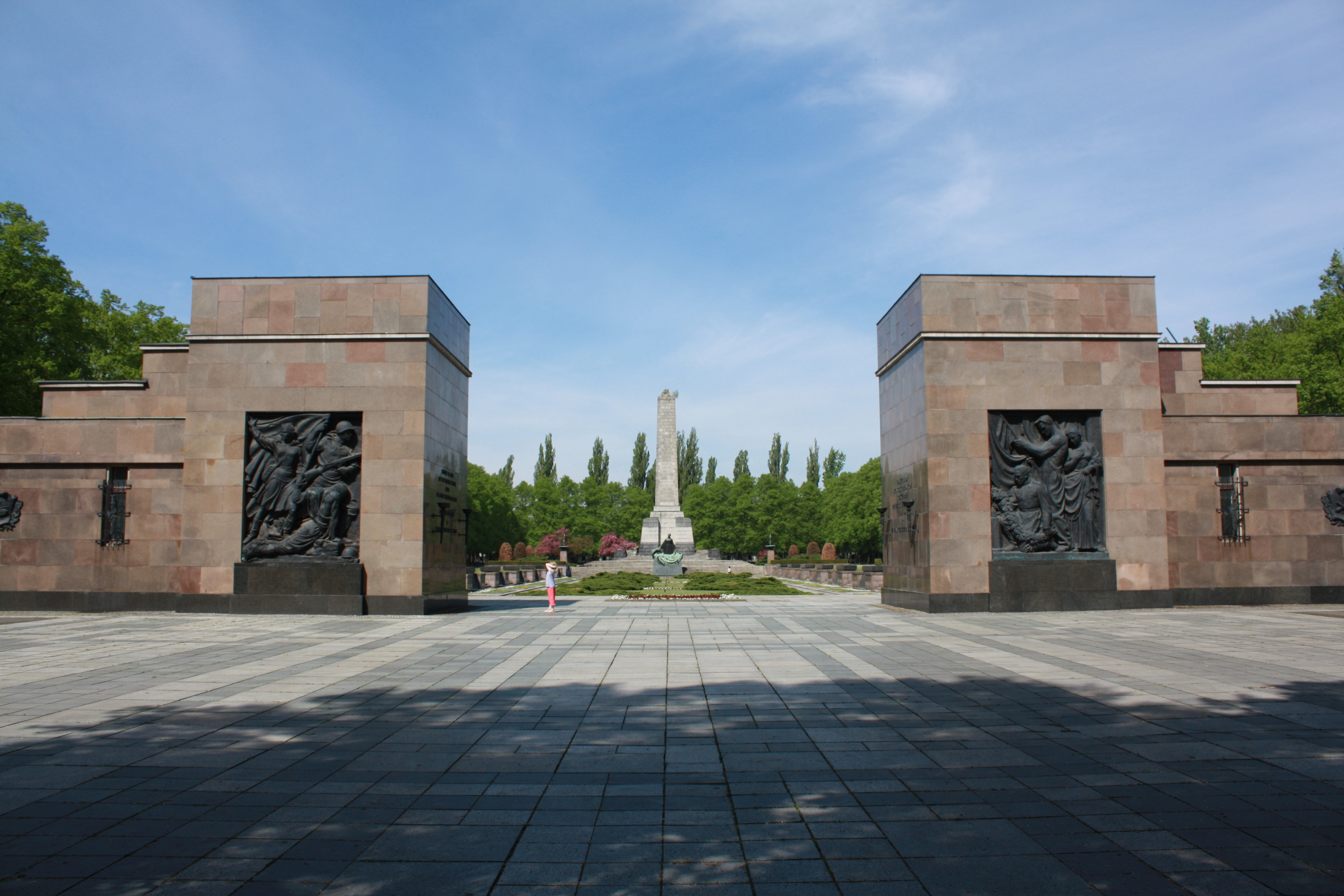
Main portal in 2009

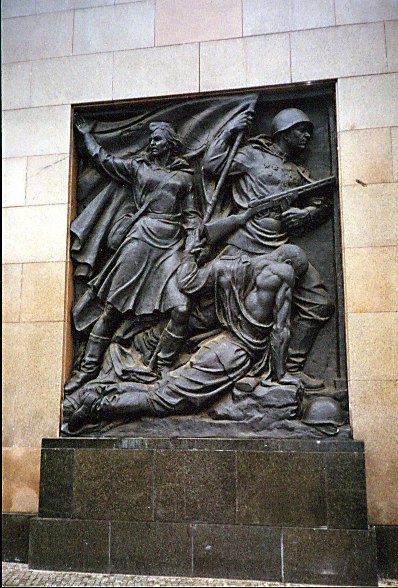
Detail from the left side of the portal of Schönholzer Heide

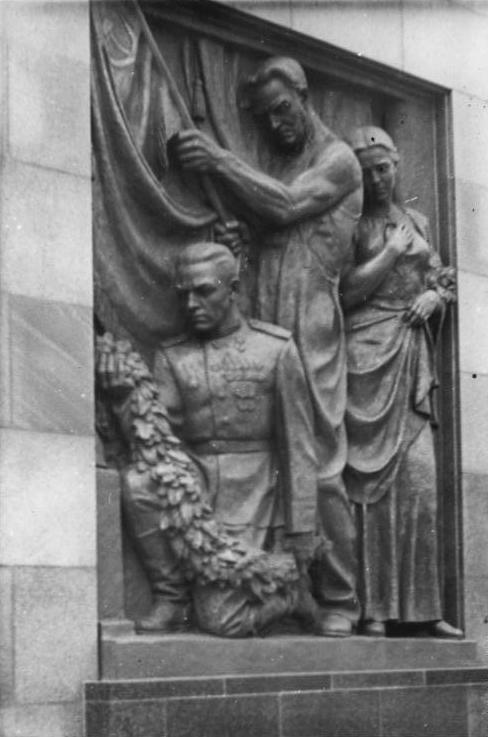
Detail from the right side of the portal of Schöholzer Heide

The Soviet War Memorial in Schönholzer Heide (Sowjetisches Ehrenmal in der Schönholzer Heide) in Pankow, Berlin was erected between May 1947 and November 1949, and covers an area of 30,000 square metres (7.4 acres). The memorial contains the largest Soviet cemetery in Berlin, which is also the largest Russian cemetery in Europe outside of Russia.

The monument is one of three Soviet memorials built in Berlin after the end of the war. The other two memorials are the Tiergarten memorial, built in 1945 in the Tiergarten district of what later became West Berlin, and the Soviet War Memorial (Treptower Park).

Schönholzer Heide was a popular recreation area in the 19th century. During the Second World War the area was turned into a work camp. After the war, the northwestern part of the area was used to build the third-largest Soviet war memorial in Berlin, together with the memorials in Treptower Park and Tiergarten.

A group of Soviet architects consisting of K. Solovyov, M. Belaventsev, V. Korolyov, and the sculptor Ivan Pershudchev designed the cemetery, where 13,200 of the 80,000 Soviet soldiers that had fallen during the Battle of Berlin would be buried. On a wall around the memorial are 100 bronze tablets with names, ranks, and birth dates of soldiers that were able to be identified. This group constitutes about one-fifth of the fallen soldiers.

On both sides of the main axis, at which on one end sits a 33.5-metre-long (110 ft) obelisk made of syenite, are eight burial chambers in which 1,182 soldiers are buried. Two Soviet colonels are buried under the Honor Hall inside the obelisk.

A statue of the personification of Mother Russia is situated in front of the obelisk and constitutes the main focal point of the memorial. On the statue's base, which is made out of black porphyry, sit 42 bronze tablets on which the names of fallen officers are inscribed.

== Gallery ==
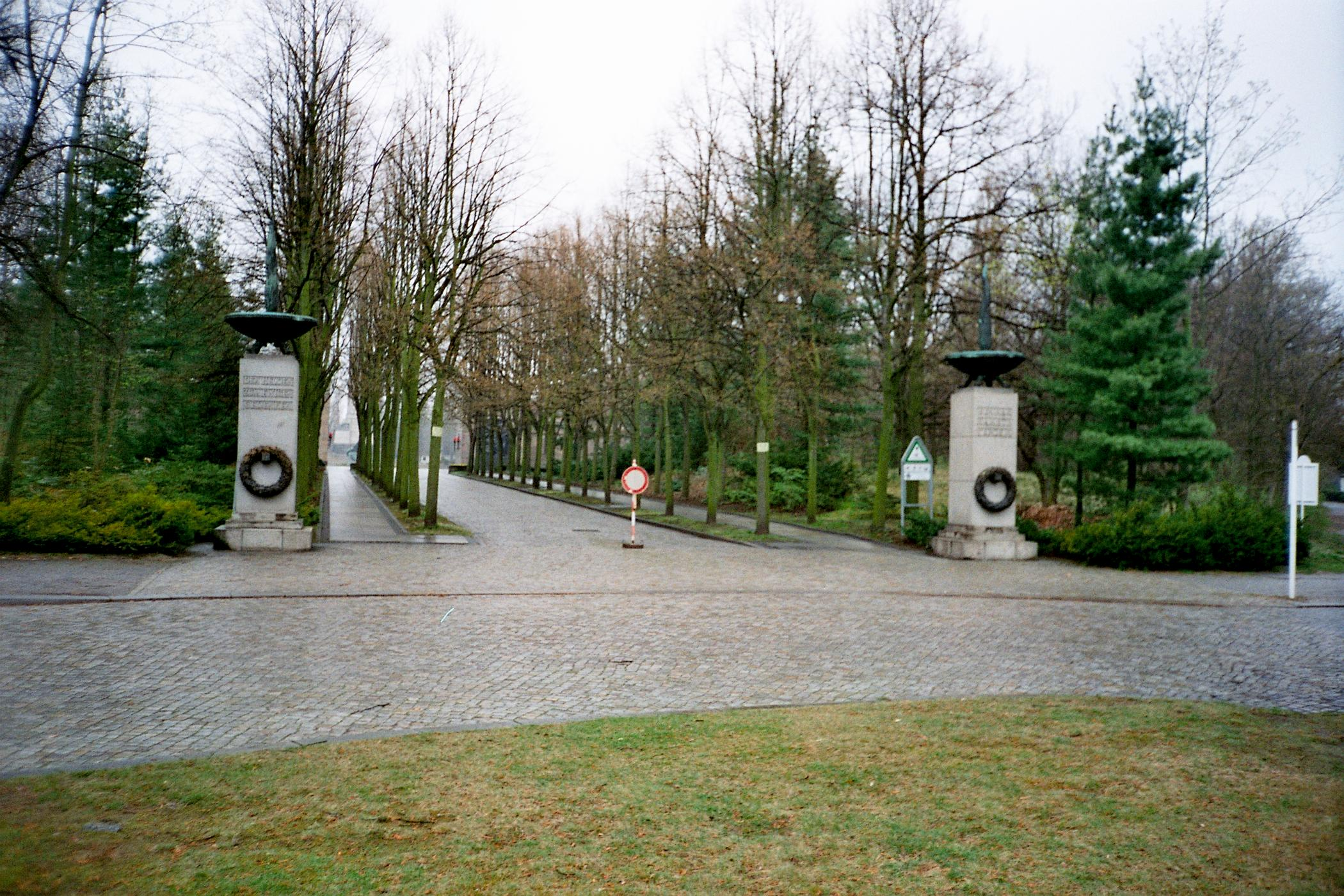
The main entrance

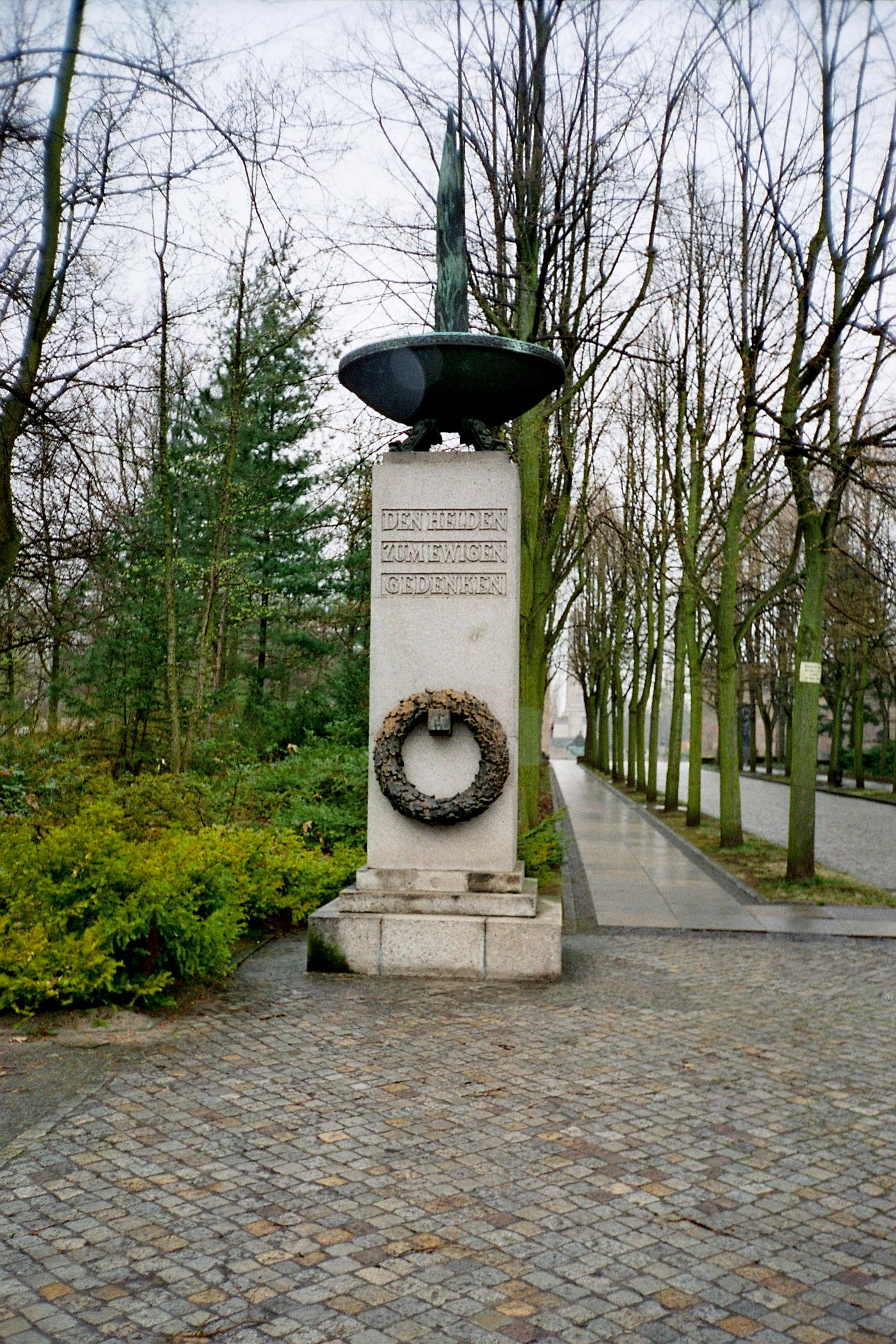
Detail from the main entrance to the monument. The text reads: "To eternal memory of the heroes."

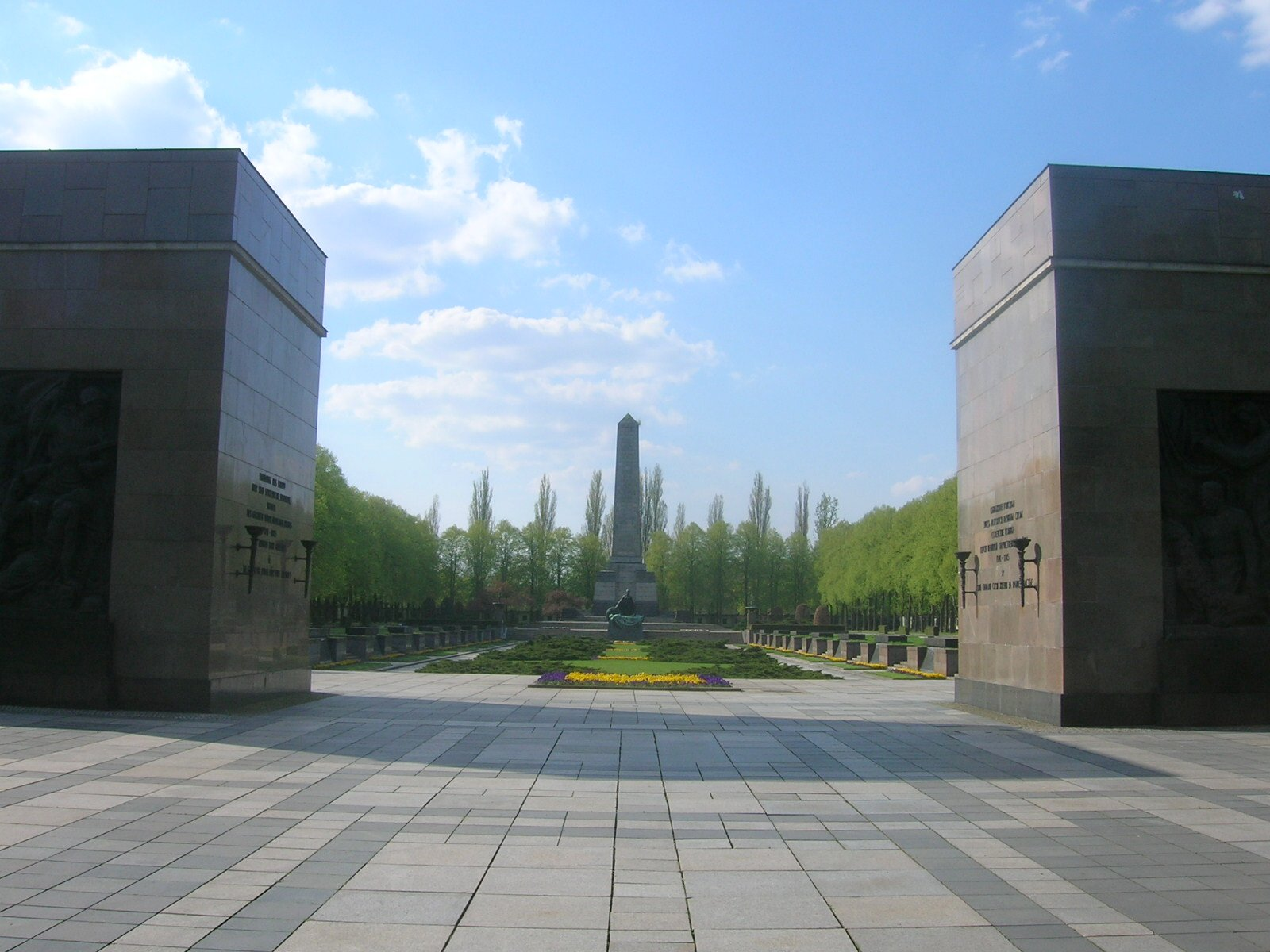
The obelisk seen through the main portal

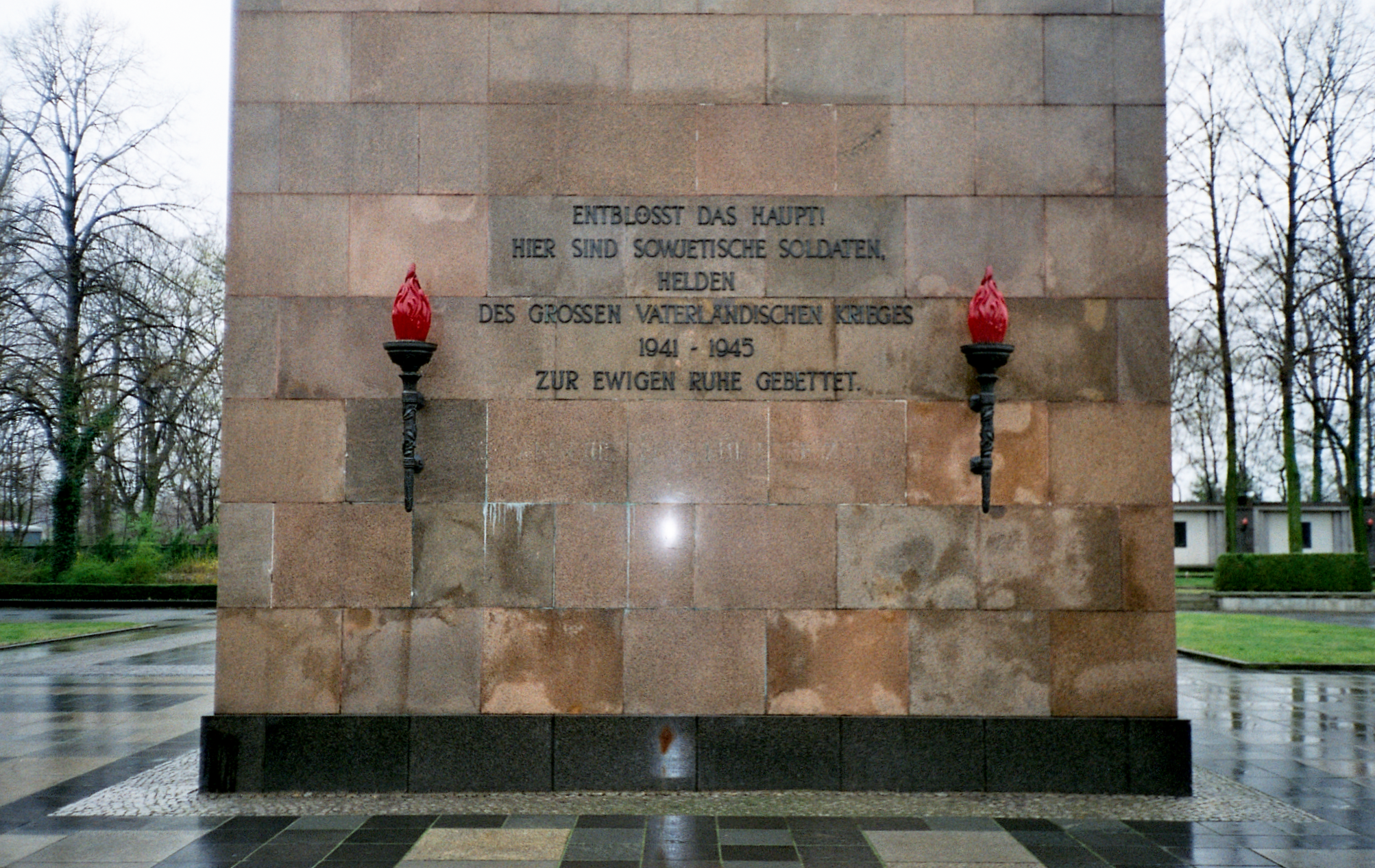
Left side of the opening into the cemetery. The text reads: "Uncover your head! Here are Soviet soldiers, heroes from the great war 1941-1945, laid to eternal rest."

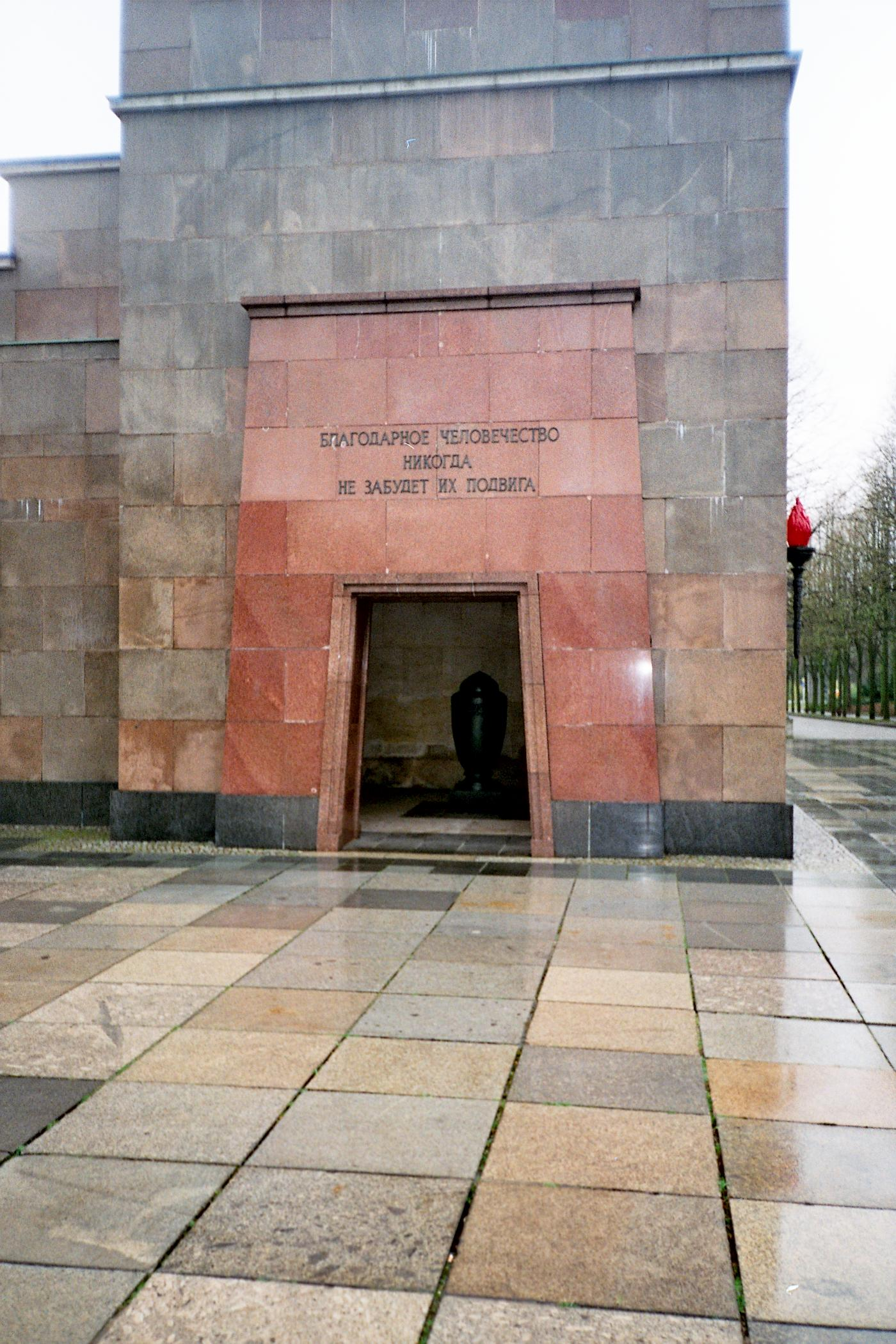
Right side of the portal. The text reads: "A grateful humanity never forgets their brave deeds."

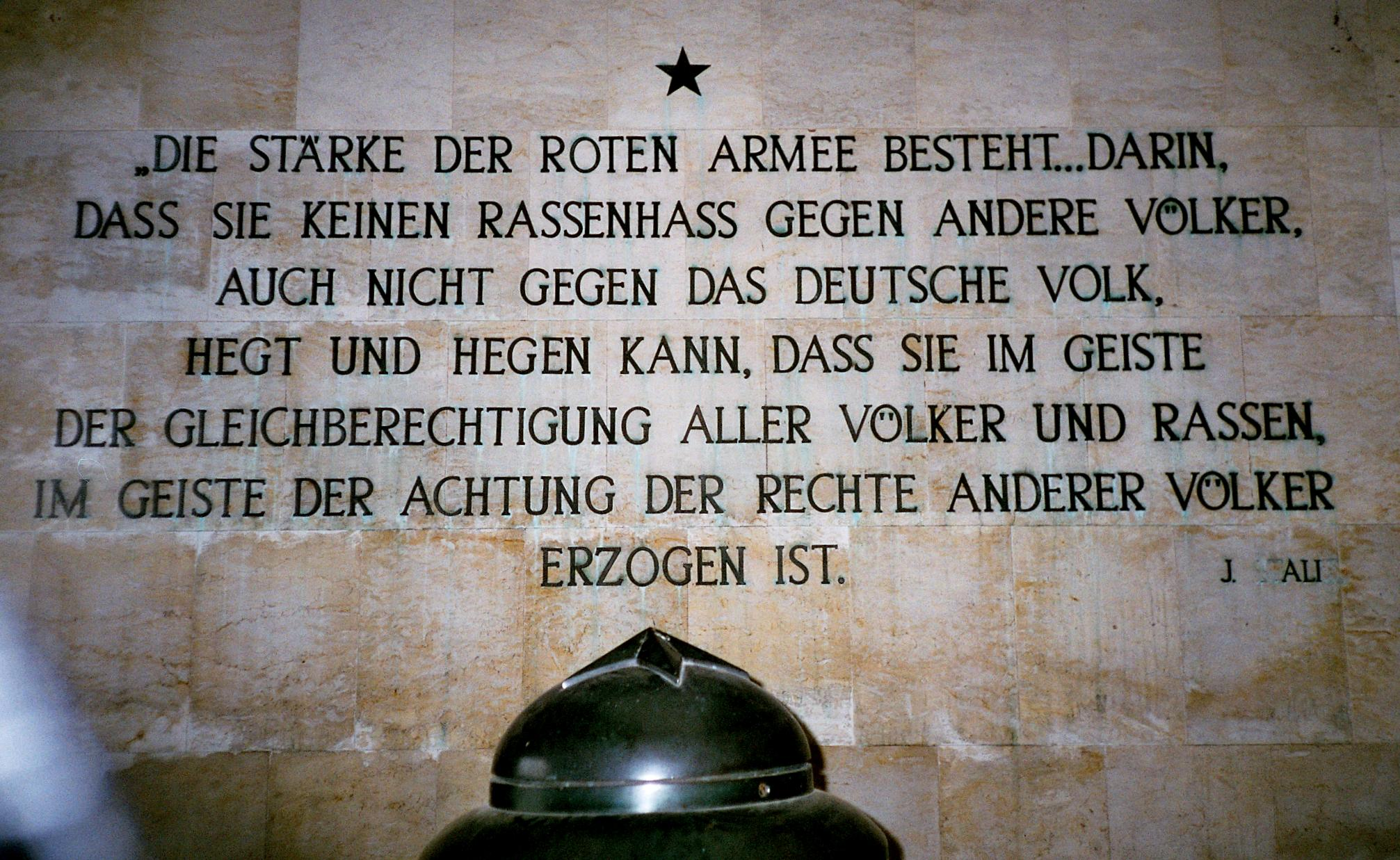
Stalin quote inside the portal. The text reads: "The strength of the Red Army was that it had none, and could not have any, racial hatred neither towards other peoples nor the German people and that they were raised in the belief of equality of all peoples and races, and in the spirit of respect towards other's rights."

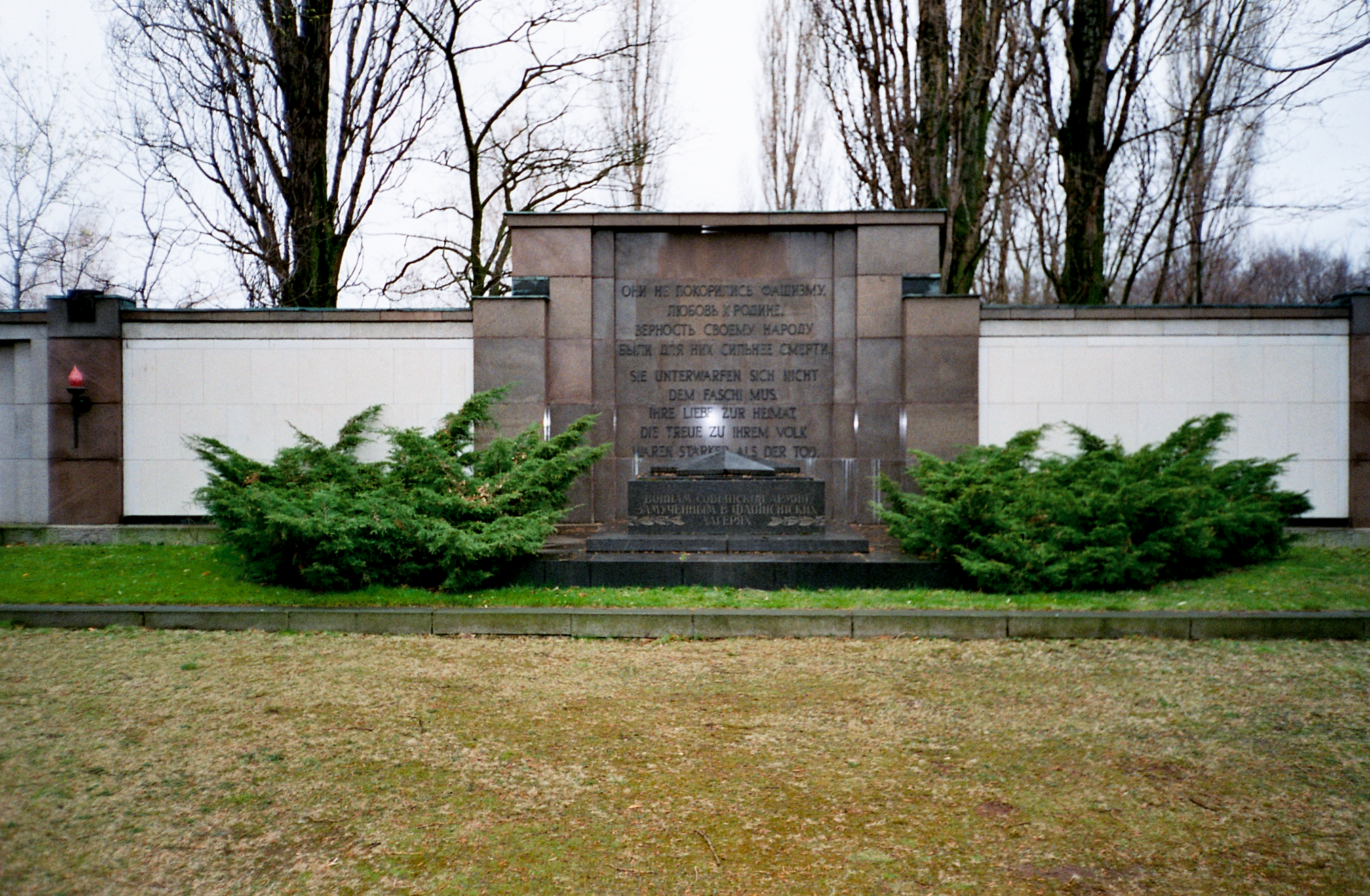
One of the 100 bronze tablets. The text reads: "They were never subjugated by fascism. The love towards their motherland and the people was stronger than death."

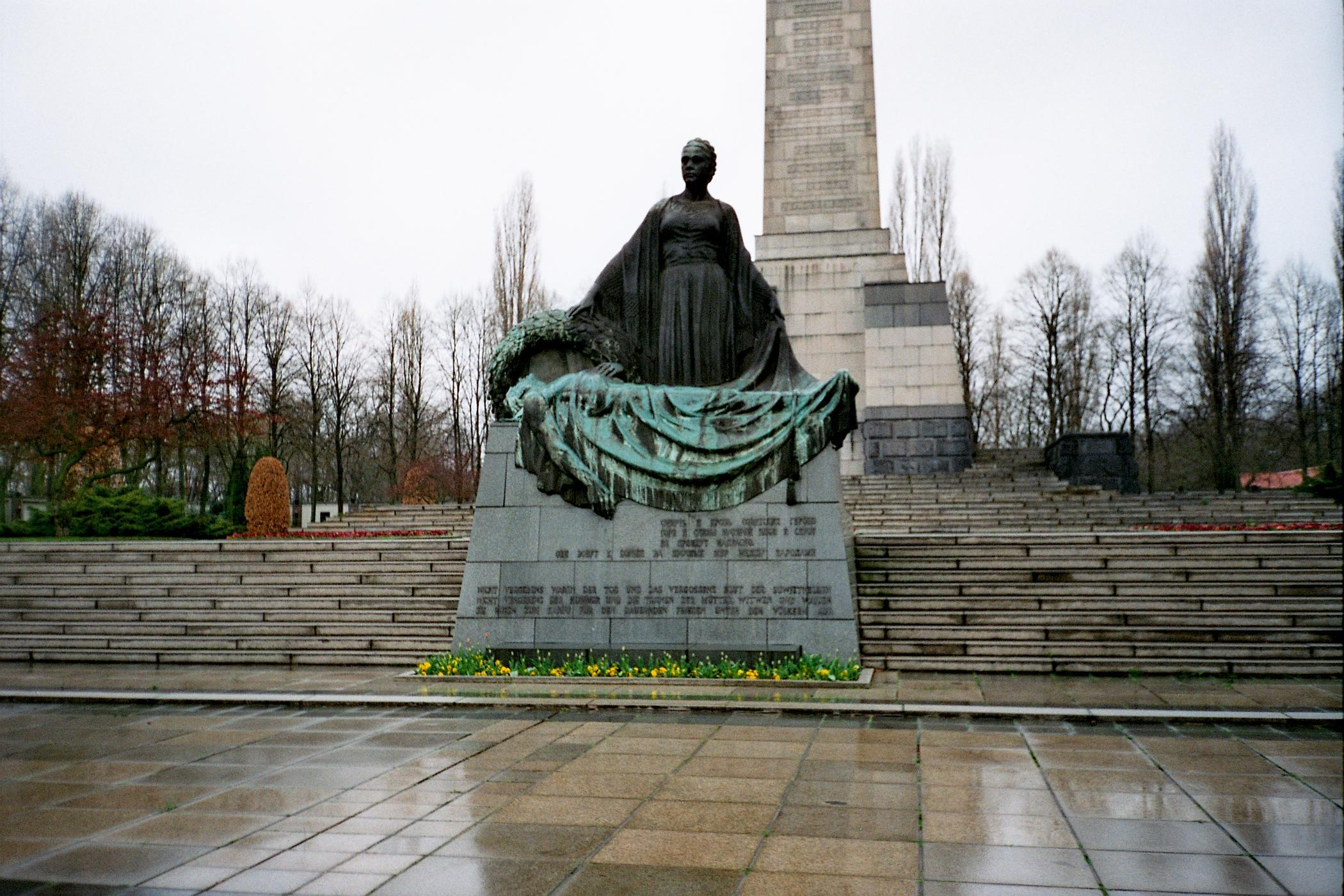
The statue of Mother Russia

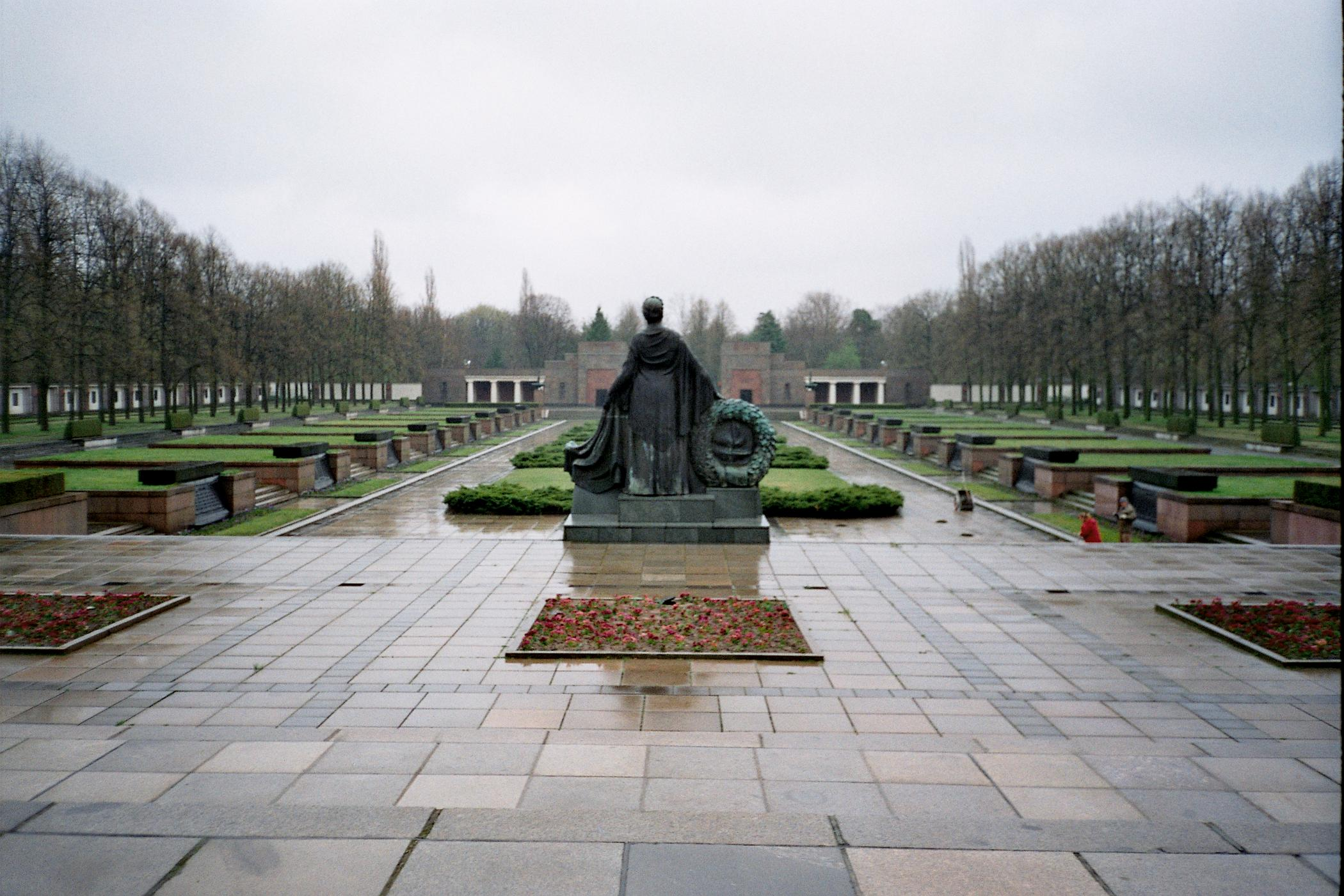
The Mother Russia statue seen from behind

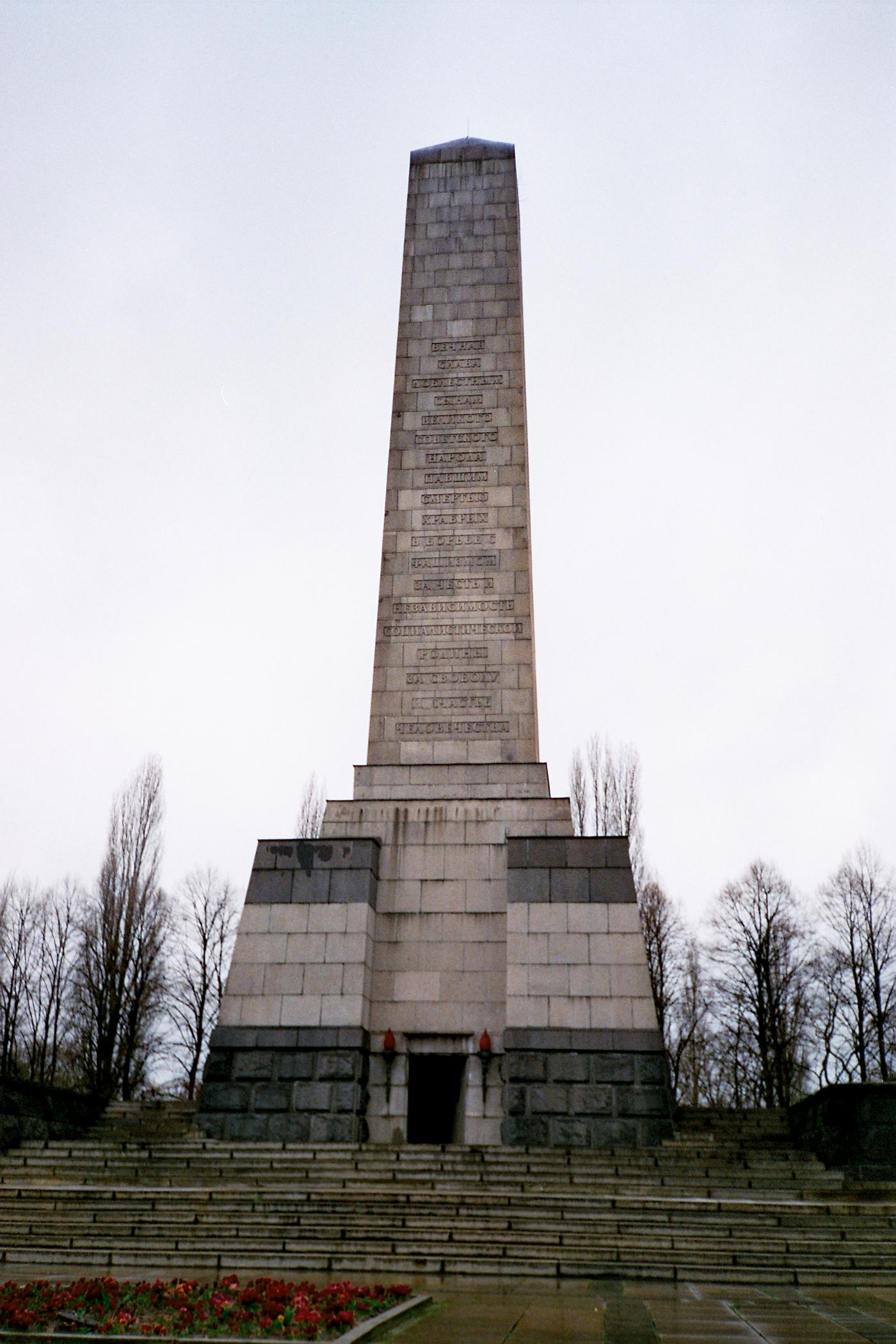
The obelisk

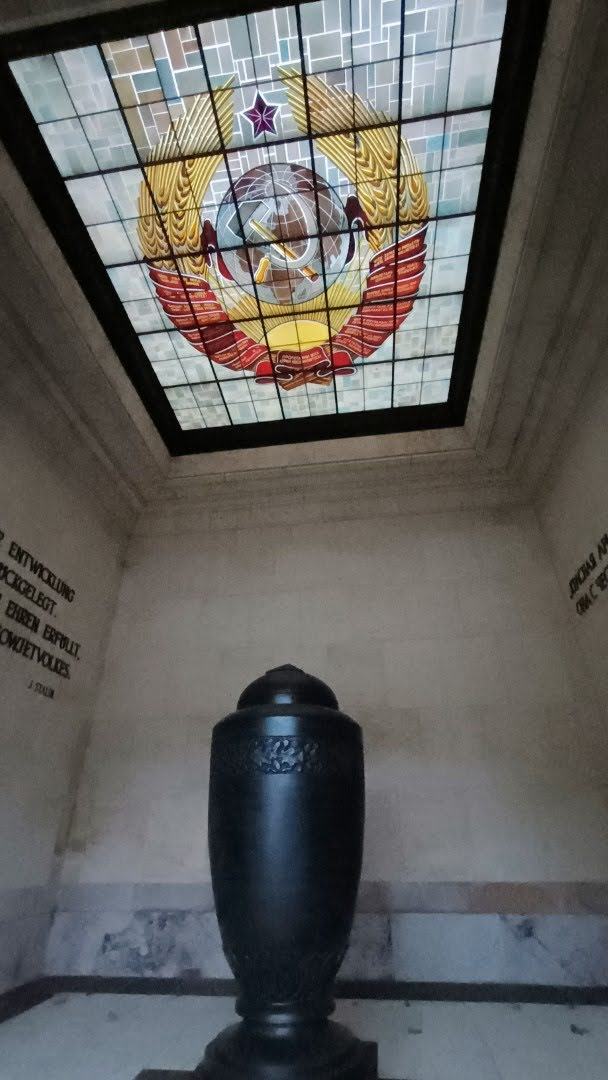
Stained glass ceiling - December 2024

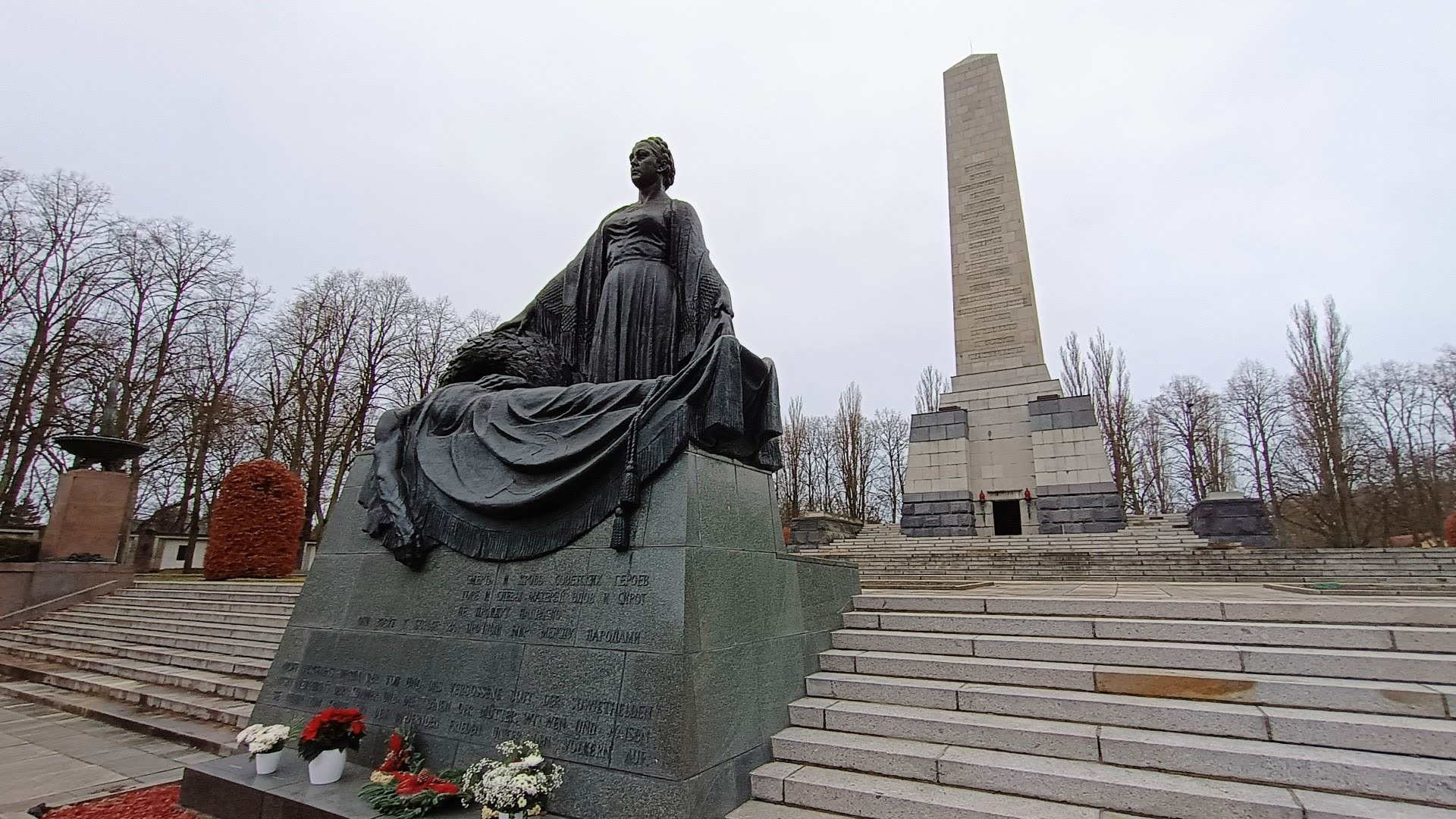
Mother Russia and Obelisk - December 2024

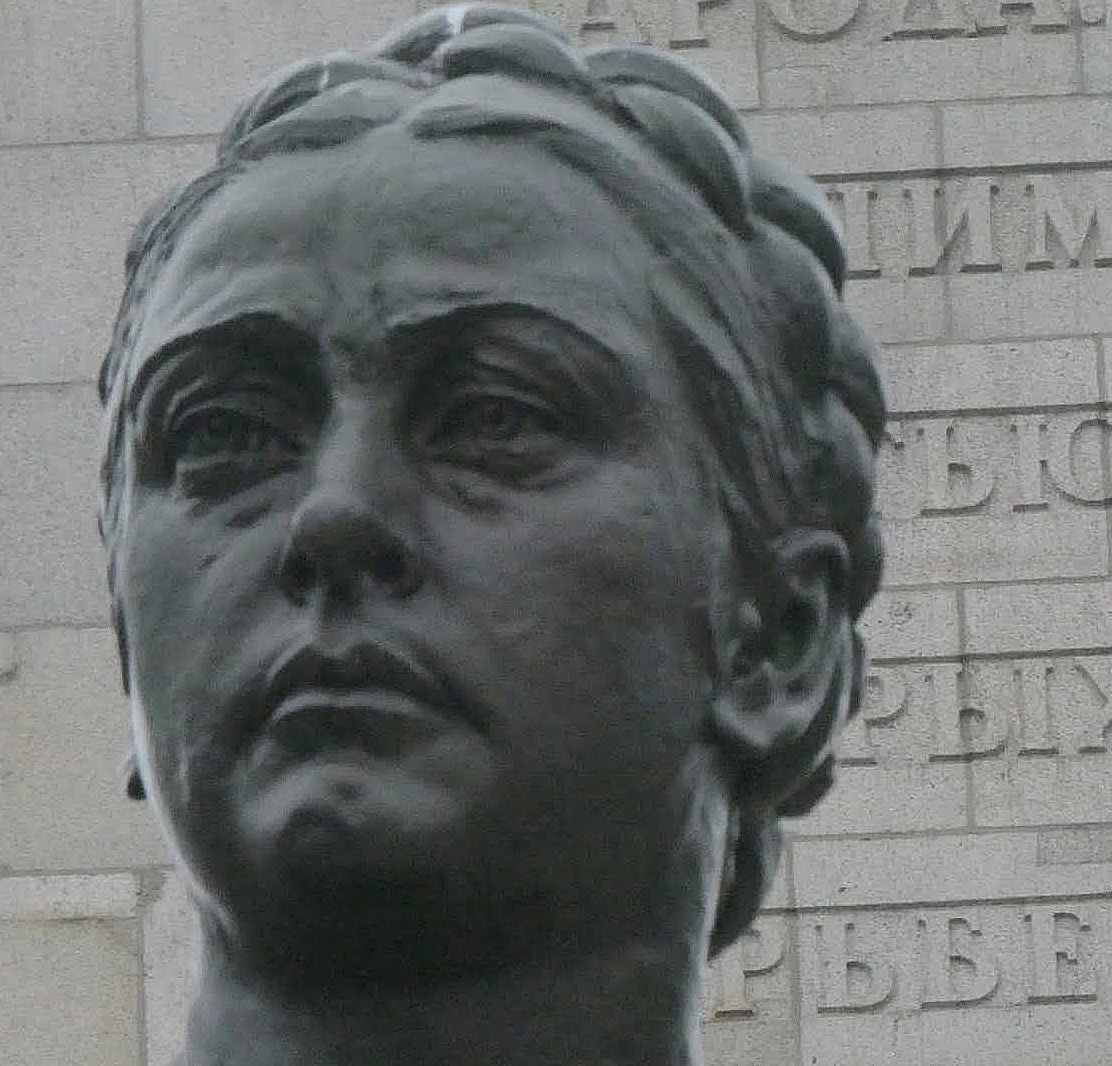
Face of Mother Russia statue - December 2024

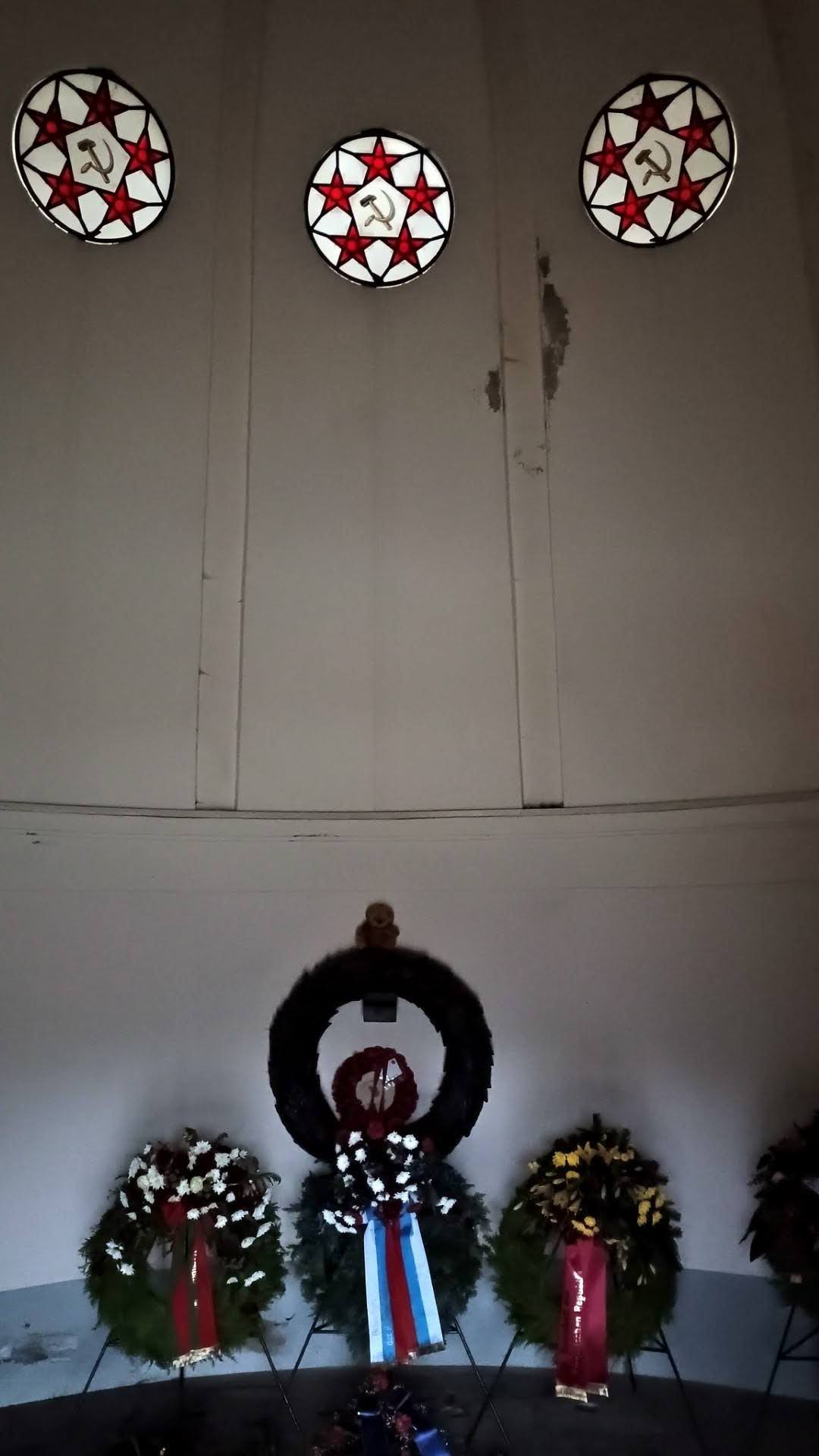
Wreaths + Stained Glass - December 2024

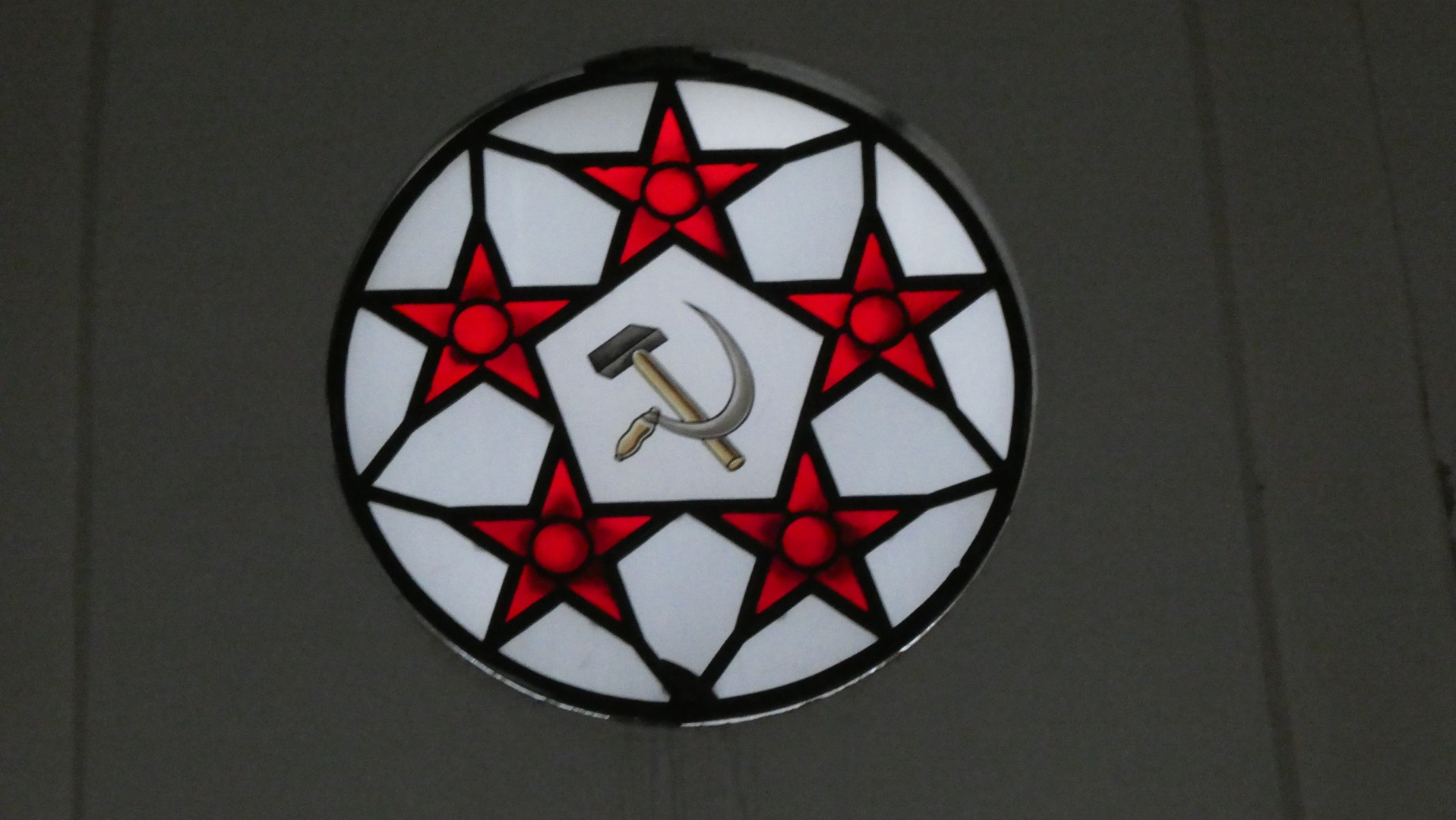
Stained Glass close up - December 2024

== See also ==
- Soviet War Memorial (Vienna)
