= 2021 Ukrainian Super Cup =

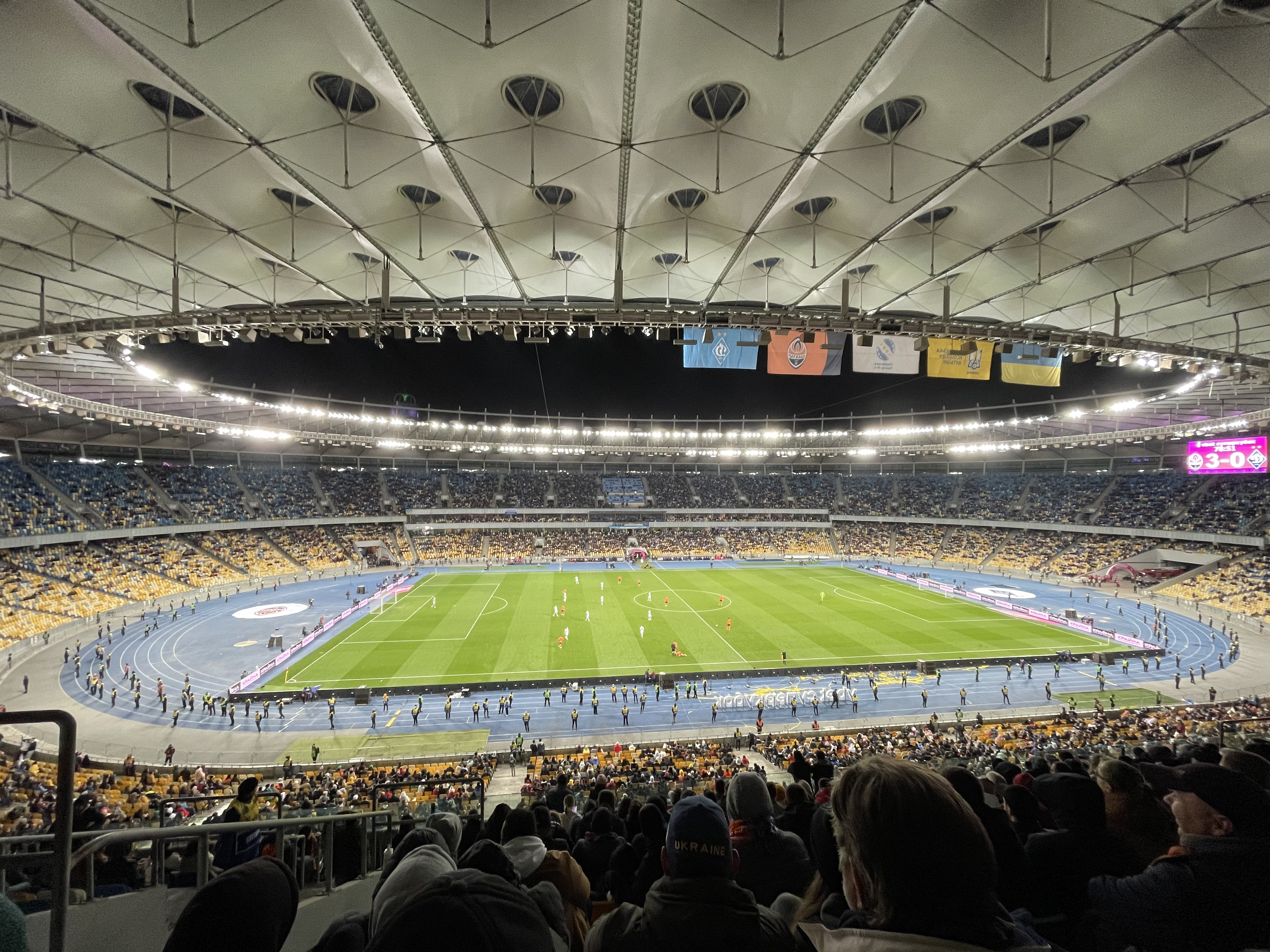
Shakhtar Donetsk	Dynamo Kyiv
3	0
- Date: 22 September 2021
- Venue: Olimpiyskiy National Sports Complex, Kyiv
- Referee: Andrii Kovalenko
- Attendance: 27,553
- Weather: 11 °C (52 °F)

The 2021 Ukrainian Super Cup was the 18th edition of Ukrainian Super Cup, an annual football match contested by the previous season's Ukrainian Premier League champions and Ukrainian Cup winners Dynamo Kyiv and league runners-up Shakhtar Donetsk. Dynamo Kyiv were the defending champions for the third consecutive year, after winning the trophy in 2018, 2019, and 2020, all against Shakhtar Donetsk.

Unlike most previous editions, the Super Cup was not a season opener, but was scheduled in the middle of the season instead. Initially the game was scheduled to be played on 24 July 2021. On 6 July, the game was postponed to 22 September 2021 on the request of both clubs because of a large number of players participating in the late stages of UEFA Euro 2020 and limited time between seasons.

While traditionally being held in Odesa, for the second year in a row the match took place in Kyiv at the Olimpiyskiy National Sports Complex. The game was to be played between rounds 8 and 9 of the 2021–22 Ukrainian Premier League.

== Preparations and other background events ==
For the 2021 Super Cup edition, VBET was announced as the new general sponsor.

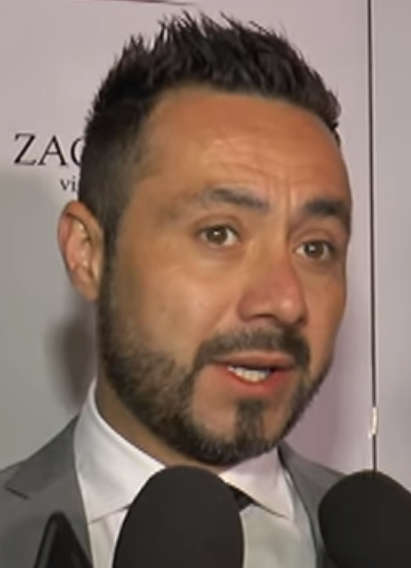
Roberto De Zerbi in 2019

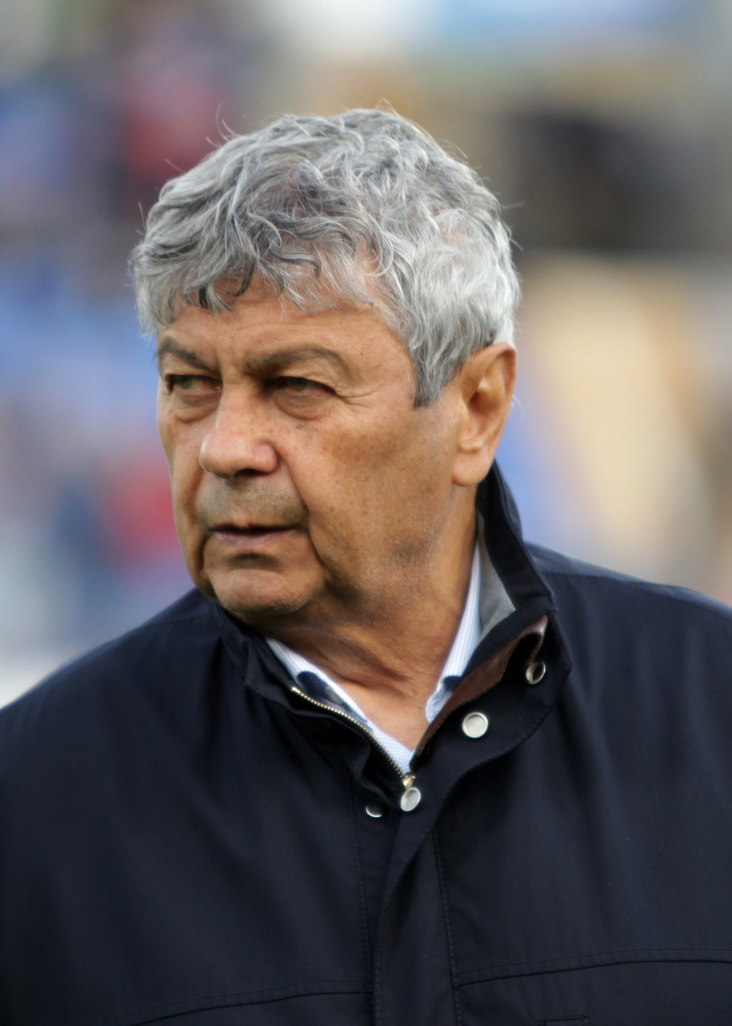
Mircea Lucescu in 2017

This game was the first ever Klasychne for Roberto De Zerbi as Shakhtar Donetsk manager, opposing Mircea Lucescu who spent 12 years in the same capacity, was one of the two original head coaches who participated in the first ever Super Cup in 2004, and won the trophy last year in his first Klasychne with Dynamo Kyiv.

== Previous encounters ==
Before this game both teams met in the Ukrainian Super Cup thirteen (13) times, the first being back in 2004. Before this game out of the previous thirteen Dynamo won 5 games and Shakhtar won 3, five more games were tied and led to penalty shootout three of which were won by Dynamo and two were won by Shakhtar.

=== Comparison table ===
Team	Qualification	Previous appearances (bold indicates winners)
Dynamo Kyiv^{TH}	2020-21 UPL champions, 2020-21 Cup winners	14 (**2004**, 2005, **2006**, **2007**, 2008, **2009**, **2011**, 2014, 2015, **2016**, 2017, **2018**, **2019**, **2020**)
Shakhtar Donetsk	2020-21 UPL runners-up	16 (2004, **2005**, 2006, 2007, **2008**, **2010**, 2011, **2012**, **2013**, **2014**, **2015**, 2016, **2017**, 2018, 2019, 2020)

== Match ==
=== Details ===
22 September 2021
21:00 EEST

Shakhtar Donetsk	3–0	Dynamo Kyiv
Traoré 30', 54'; Patrick 61'	Report

Olimpiyskiy National Sports Complex, Kyiv
Attendance: 27,553
Referee: Andriy Kovalenko (Poltava)

**Shakhtar Donetsk**	**Dynamo Kyiv**

**Shakhtar Donetsk**
GK	30	(Ukraine) Andriy Pyatov (c)
DF	2	(Brazil) Dodô
DF	5	(Brazil) Marlon	(yellow card) 59'
DF	22	(Ukraine) Mykola Matviyenko
DF	31	(Brazil) Ismaily		(substituted off) 67'
MF	6	(Ukraine) Taras Stepanenko		(substituted off) 78'
MF	27	(Brazil) Maycon
MF	11	(Ukraine) Marlos		(substituted off) 67'
MF	21	(Brazil) Alan Patrick	(yellow card) 39' (goal) 61'
MF	38	(Brazil) Pedrinho	(yellow card) 88'	(substituted off) 88'
FW	23	(Burkina Faso) Lassina Traoré	30', 54'	(substituted off) 78'
**Substitutes**
GK	1	(Ukraine) Oleksiy Shevchenko
DF	3	(Brazil) Vitão
DF	4	(Ukraine) Serhiy Kryvtsov	(yellow card) 77'	(substituted on) 67'
MF	8	(Brazil) Marcos Antônio		(substituted on) 78'
MF	14	(Brazil) Tetê
MF	19	(Israel) Manor Solomon		(substituted on) 67'
DF	26	(Ukraine) Yukhym Konoplya		(substituted on) 88'
DF	44	(Ukraine) Viktor Korniyenko
FW	45	(Ukraine) Danylo Sikan		(substituted on) 78'
**Head coach**
(Italy) Roberto De Zerbi

**Dynamo Kyiv**
GK	71	(Ukraine) Denys Boyko
MF	5	(Ukraine) Serhiy Sydorchuk (c)		(substituted off) 67'
MF	10	(Ukraine) Mykola Shaparenko	(yellow card) 63'
MF	14	(Uruguay) Carlos de Pena		(substituted off) 70'
MF	15	(Ukraine) Viktor Tsyhankov	(yellow card) 80'
DF	16	(Ukraine) Vitalii Mykolenko
MF	29	(Ukraine) Vitaliy Buyalskyi
DF	25	(Ukraine) Illya Zabarnyi	(yellow card) 90+1'
DF	34	(Ukraine) Oleksandr Syrota	(yellow card) 71'
FW	89	(Ukraine) Vladyslav Supriaha		(substituted off) 67'
DF	94	(Poland) Tomasz Kędziora		(substituted off) 67'
**Substitutes**
GK	1	(Ukraine) Heorhiy Bushchan
MF	7	(Slovenia) Benjamin Verbič
MF	8	(Ukraine) Volodymyr Shepelyev
DF	13	(Ukraine) Artem Shabanov
MF	18	(Ukraine) Oleksandr Andriyevskyi		(substituted on) 67'
MF	19	(Ukraine) Denys Harmash		(substituted on) 67'
MF	20	(Ukraine) Oleksandr Karavayev		(substituted on) 67'
FW	22	(Brazil) Vitinho		(substituted on) 70'
DF	24	(Ukraine) Oleksandr Tymchyk
**Head coach**
(Romania) Mircea Lucescu

Assistant referees:
Andriy Skrypka (Kropyvnytskyi)
Semen Shlonchak (Cherkasy)
Fourth referee:
Ihor Paskhal (Kherson)
Reserve assistant referee:
Oleksandr Zhukov (Kharkiv)
Video assistant referee:
Viktor Mariash (Donetsk)
Assistant video assistant referee:
Leonid Yarmolynskyi (Kyiv Oblast)

**Match rules**

- 90 minutes of regulation.
- No extra time of regulation if score is level.
- Penalty shoot-out if scores still level.
- Nine named substitutes, of which up to five may be used in three opportunities, excluding substitutions made at half-time.
- No more than 9 foreign players on a field at one time for each team.
