= List of FC Shakhtar Donetsk managers =

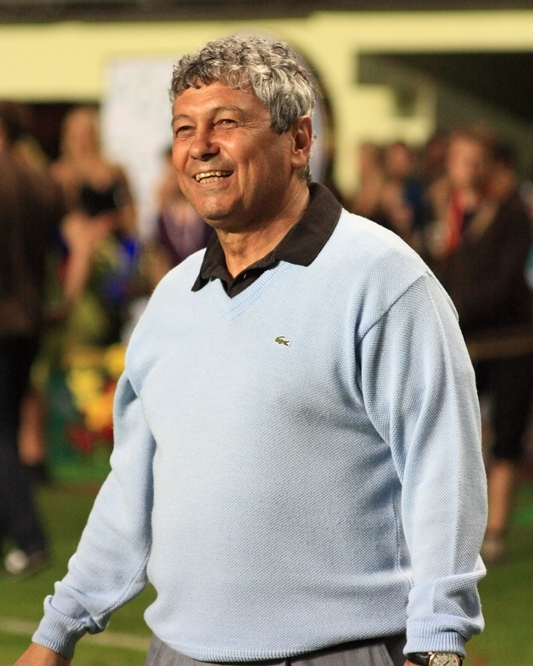
Mircea Lucescu — is the coach who brought the team the most titles

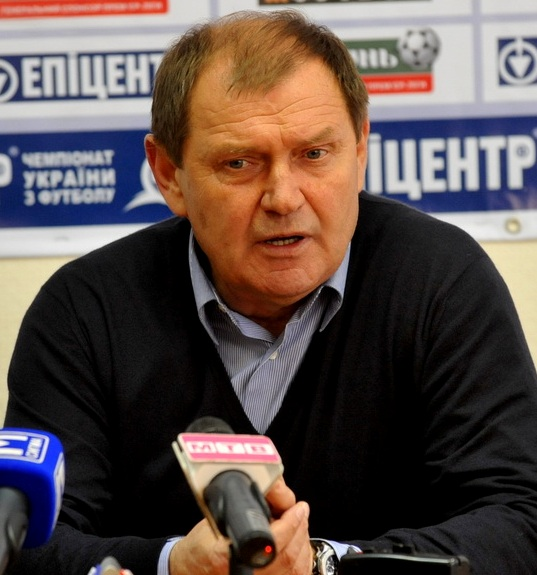
Valeriy Yaremchenko — led «Shakhtar» Donetsk five times

Below is a list of the head coaches of the Shakhtar football club (Donetsk, Ukraine), their statistics and achievements in the club.

"Miner" ("Coal Miners" (1936), "Stakhanovets" (1936–46 years), "Shakhtar" (since 1946)) is a Ukrainian football club from the city of Donetsk playing in the Premier League of Ukraine. The first and only among Ukrainian clubs to win the UEFA Cup. Winner of the USSR Super Cup, four-time winner of the USSR Cup, thirteen-time champion of Ukraine, thirteen-time winner of the Ukrainian Cup, nine-time winner of the Ukrainian Super Cup.

The first official match in the Soviet Top League "Coal miners" played in Kazan against the local team "Dynamo" and lost with a score of 1:4. The first coach of the club was Nikolay Grigoryevich Naumov.

Most matches (574 or according to other information 573) the club spent under the coach - Mircea Lucescu, who headed Shakhtar Donetsk from 2004 to 2016. Lucescu also ranks first in the number of victories - 389.

== List of coaches ==
Information correct as of April 3, 2023. Only official matches are included in the statistics.

М	number of matches played	W	number of matches won	D	number of matches lost	L	number of draws

Image	Name	Cityzenship	Beginning of work	End of work	М	W	L	D	% P	Honours	Note.
	Naumov Nikolai Grigorievich	(Soviet Union) USSR	24 May 1936	1937	28	10	5	13	0.36		
	Borisenko Vasily Danilovich	(Soviet Union) USSR	1938	August 1938	21	11	3	7	0.52		
	Arkhangelsky Grigory Zinovievich	(Soviet Union) USSR	1938	1939	63	24	18	21	0.38		
	Dangulov Abram Khristoforovich	(Soviet Union) USSR	July 1939	July 1941	58	20	10	28	0.34		
	Kuznetsov Nikolai Stepanovich	(Soviet Union) USSR	1944	1945	20	10	5	5	0.5		
	Aleksei Kostylev	(Soviet Union) USSR	1946	1948	62	33	14	15	0.53		
	Mazanov Georgy Vasilievich	(Soviet Union) USSR	March 1949	1949	35	5	8	22	0.14		
	Viktor Ivanovich Novikov	(Soviet Union) USSR	1950	1951	74	31	18	25	0.42	Soviet Top League 1951 - (3d place)	
	Konstantin Kvashnin	(Soviet Union) USSR	1952	1952	17	2	6	9	0.12		
	Aleksandr Ponomarev	(Soviet Union) USSR	1953	8 June 1956	93	45	28	20	0.48		
	Ermilov Vasily Alekseevich	(Soviet Union) USSR	9 June 1956	1957	35	15	6	14	0.43		
	Dangulov Abram Khristoforovich	(Soviet Union) USSR	1958	1958	23	9	3	11	0.39		
	Viktor Ivanovich Novikov	(Soviet Union) USSR	1959	1959	24	5	5	14	0.21		
	Konstantin Schegotsky	(Soviet Union) USSR	1959	27 May 1960	32	8	7	17	0.25		
	Oleg Oshenkov	(Soviet Union) USSR	26 June 1960	October 1969	364	136	108	120	0.37	Soviet Cup: 1961, 1962	
	Yuriy Voynov	(Soviet Union) USSR	1969	6 July 1970	49	11	16	2	0.22		
	Artyom Falyan	(Soviet Union) USSR	13 July 1970	15 July 1971	37	15	7	15	0.41		
	Nikolai Petrovich Morozov	(Soviet Union) USSR	July 1971	December 1971	19	6	4	9	0.32		
	Oleh Bazylevych	(Soviet Union) USSR	1972	1973	79	38	22	19	0.48		
	Zakharov Yuri Vladimirovich	(Soviet Union) USSR	January 1974	6 August 1974	25	9	9	7	0.36		
	Vladimir Salkov	(Soviet Union) USSR	14 August 1974	1978	163	74	46	43	0.45	Soviet Top League: 1975 (2d place), 1978 (3d place)	
	Viktor Nosov	(Soviet Union) USSR	1979	1985	290	125	67	98	0.66	Soviet Top League: 1979 (2nd place); Soviet Cup: 1980, 1983; Soviet Super Cup: 1984	
	Oleh Bazylevych	(Soviet Union) USSR	1986	1986	38	13	12	13	0.34		
	Anatoliy Konkov	(Soviet Union) USSR	1986	1989	161	56	44	61	0.35		
	Valeriy Yaremchenko	(Soviet Union) USSR / Ukraine	June 1989	1994	209	88	61	60	0.42	Ukrainian Premier League: 1993/94 (2nd place)	
	Vladimir Salkov	Russia	1995	August 1995	34	14	9	11	0.41	Ukrainian Cup:1995	
	Valeriy Rudakov	Ukraine	September 1995	June 1996	36	14	9	13	0.39		
	Valeriy Yaremchenko	Ukraine	July 1996	31 March 1999	105	68	18	19	0.65	Ukrainian Premier League: 1996/97, 1997/98 (2nd place) Ukrainian Cup:1997	
	Anatoliy Byshovets	Russia	1 April 1999	1 October 1999	26	14	5	7	0.54	Ukrainian Premier League 1998/99 (2nd place)	
	Drozdenko Alexey Mitrofanovich	Ukraine	1 October 1999	16 November 1999	6	3	0	3	0.5	Ukrainian Premier League: 1999/2000 (2nd place)	
	Viktor Prokopenko	Ukraine	17 November 1999	12 October 2001	78	54	12	12	0.69	Ukrainian Premier League: 2000/01 (2nd place) Ukrainian Cup:2001	
	Valeriy Yaremchenko	Ukraine	12 October 2001	8 January 2002	7	4	1	2	0.57	Ukrainian Premier League: 2000/01 (2nd place)	
	Nevio Scala	Italy	9 January 2002	18 September 2002	30	20	7	3	0.67	Ukrainian Premier League: 2001/02 Ukrainian Cup: 2002	
	Valeriy Yaremchenko	Ukraine	19 September 2002	12 June 2003	31	19	5	7	0.61	Ukrainian Premier League: 2002/03 (2nd place)	
	Bernd Schuster	Germany	13 June 2003	5 May 2004	38	24	7	7	0.63	Ukrainian Cup: 2003 (2nd place)	
	Viktor Prokopenko	Ukraine	8 May 2004	16 May 2004	2	2	0	0	1		
	Mircea Lucescu	Romania	17 May 2004	21 May 2016	574	389	92	93	0.68	Ukrainian Premier League: 2004/05, 2005/06, 2007/08, 2009/10, 2010/11, 2011/12, 2012/13, 2013/14; 2nd place: 2003/04, 2006/07, 2008/09, 2014/15, 2015/16 Ukrainian Cup: 2004, 2008, 2011, 2012, 2013, 2016; 2nd place: 2005, 2007, 2009, 2014, 2015 Ukrainian Super Cup: 2005, 2008, 2010, 2012, 2013, 2014, 2015 2nd place: 2004, 2006, 2007, 2011 UEFA Europa League 2008/09 UEFA Super Cup: 2009 (2nd place)	
	Paulo Fonseca	Portugal	31 May 2016	12 June 2019	138	102	19	17	0.74	Ukrainian Premier League: 2016/17, 2017/18, 2018/19 Ukrainian Cup: 2017, 2018, 2019 Ukrainian Super Cup: 2016 Ukrainian Super Cup, 2017 2nd place: 2018, 2019	
	Luís Castro	Portugal	12 June 2019	9 May 2021	84	50	17	17	0.6	Ukrainian Premier League: 2019/20 Ukrainian Super Cup: 2nd place: 2020	
	Roberto De Zerbi	Italy	25 May 2021	11 July 2022	30	20	5	5	0.67	Ukrainian Super Cup: 2021 Ukrainian Premier League: 2020/21	
	Igor Jovićević	Croatia	14 July 2022	30 June 2023	40	24	10	6	0.6	Ukrainian Premier League: 2021/22, 2022/23	
	Patrick van Leeuwen	Netherlands	3 July 2023	16 October 2023	12	7	3	2	0.58		
	Darijo Srna (Acting)	Croatia	17 October 2023	24 October 2023	1	1	0	0	1		
	Marino Pušić	Croatia	24 October 2023	24 May 2025	71	44	13	14	0.62	Ukrainian Premier League: 2023–24; Ukrainian Cup: 2023–24	
	Arda Turan	Turkey	27 May 2025								
