= 2020 Ukrainian Super Cup =

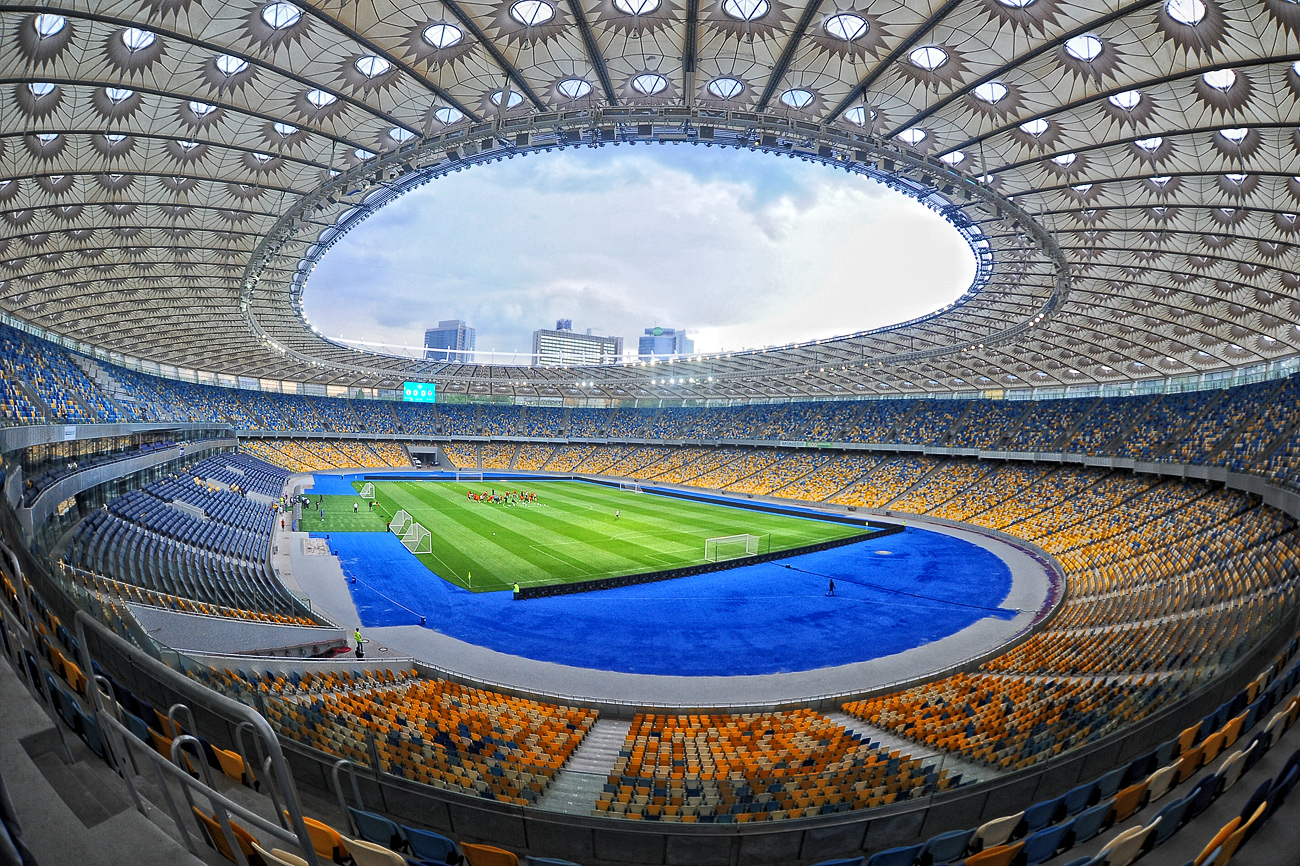
Shakhtar Donetsk	Dynamo Kyiv
1	3
- Date: 25 August 2020
- Venue: Olimpiyskiy National Sports Complex, Kyiv
- Referee: Vitaliy Romanov (Dnipro)
- Attendance: 0 (Note: The match was played behind closed doors due to the COVID-19 pandemic in Ukraine.)
- Weather: Light rain, +20°C

The 2020 Ukrainian Super Cup was the 17th edition of Ukrainian Super Cup, an annual season opener football match contested by the previous season's Ukrainian Premier League champions Shakhtar Donetsk and Ukrainian Cup winners Dynamo Kyiv.

The game was scheduled to be played later than usual due to the COVID-19 pandemic. Also while traditionally being held in Odesa, this season it was scheduled to take place in Kyiv at the Olimpiyskiy National Sports Complex on 25 August 2020. The game was played after Round 1 of the 2020–21 Ukrainian Premier League.

== Preparations and other background events ==
For this game the official sponsor was announced TM Waissburg, the official football for the ninth time became the Danish "Select" (Select Sport) and as a television broadcasting partner became Ukrainian television channels "TRK Ukraína" and "Futbol 1/2/3" (both part of Media Group Ukraína).

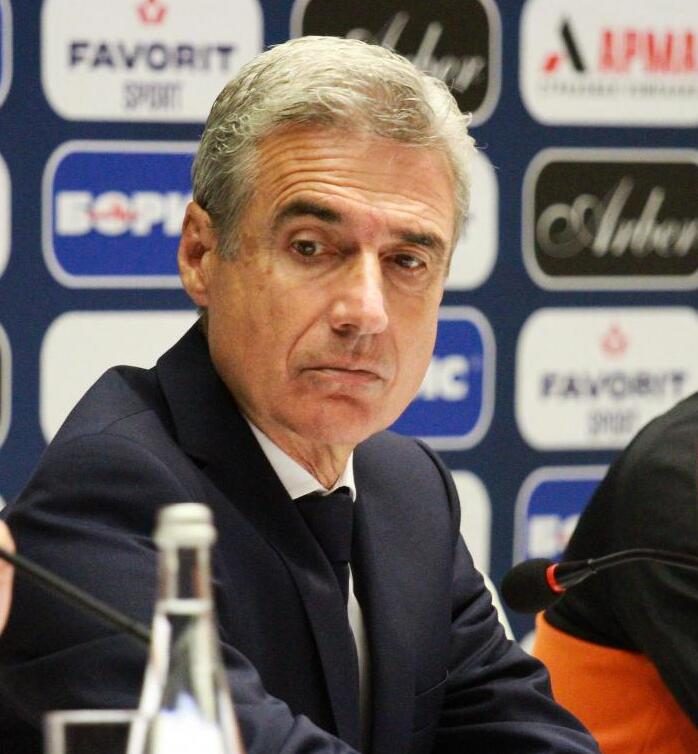
Luís Castro in 2019

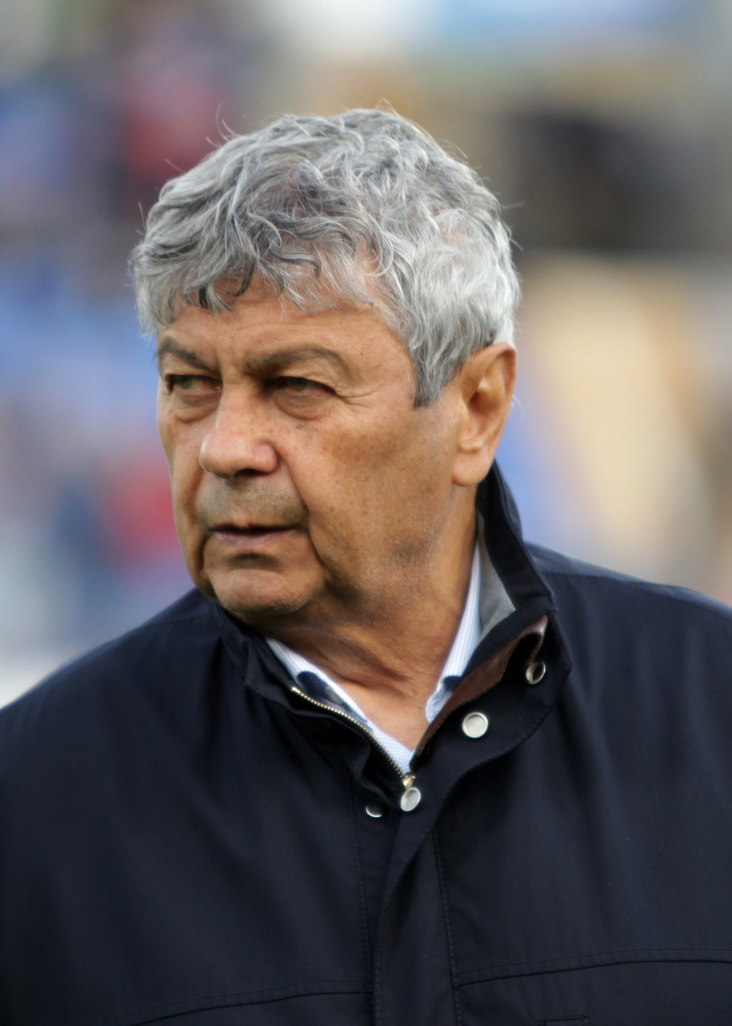
Mircea Lucescu in 2017

This game is the first, in which Mircea Lucescu who spent in Shakhtar Donetsk a dozen of years and one of the two original head coaches who participated in the tournament back in 2004 will be leading the chief opponents of the Donetsk club. Anatoliy Demianenko commenting on the game stated that the main intrigue is Lucescu versus Shakhtar. The former players of Shakhtar Artem Fedetskyi and Oleksiy Hai commenting on the game agree that it is unusual game, but Shakhtar shall still win. The head coach of Shakhtar Luís Castro is eager to win the Super Cup which slipped away the last season. Castro is sure that both clubs will field their best squads for the game and Lucescu will be requesting the maximum from his. Another Ukrainian head coach Myron Markevych thinks that the game does not matter and the main task for the teams is to qualify for the European competitions.

The game started the next day after the national holiday Independence Day of Ukraine.

The refereeing team led by Romanov partially preserved from the last year was supervised by Luciano Luci, while VAR operations was supervised by Serhiy Lysenchuk.

== Previous encounters ==
Before this game both teams met in the Ukrainian Super Cup twelve (12) times, the first being back in 2004. Before this game out of the previous twelve Dynamo won 4 games and Shakhtar won 3, five more games were tied and led to penalty shootout three of which were won by Dynamo and two were won by Shakhtar.

=== Comparison table ===
Team	Qualification	Previous appearances (bold indicates winners)
Shakhtar Donetsk	2019–20 UPL champions	15 (2004, **2005**, 2006, 2007, **2008**, **2010**, 2011, **2012**, **2013**, **2014**, **2015**, 2016, **2017**, 2018, 2019)
Dynamo Kyiv^{TH}	2019–20 Cup winners	13 (**2004**, 2005, **2006**, **2007**, 2008, **2009**, **2011**, 2014, 2015, **2016**, 2017, **2018**, **2019**)

== Match ==
=== Details ===
25 August 2020
21:00 EEST

Shakhtar Donetsk	1–3	Dynamo Kyiv
Moraes 37'	Report	De Pena 20'; Rodrigues 31'; Sol 83'

Olimpiyskiy National Sports Complex, Kyiv
Attendance: 0
Referee: Vitaliy Romanov (Dnipro)

**Shakhtar Donetsk**	**Dynamo Kyiv**

**Shakhtar Donetsk**
GK	30	(Ukraine) Andriy Pyatov (c)
DF	2	(Brazil) Dodô
DF	4	(Ukraine) Serhiy Kryvtsov	(substituted off) 83'
DF	77	(Ukraine) Valeriy Bondar	(substituted off) 69'
DF	22	(Ukraine) Mykola Matviyenko
MF	6	(Ukraine) Taras Stepanenko
MF	21	(Brazil) Alan Patrick
MF	8	(Brazil) Marcos Antônio	(substituted off) 46'
MF	14	(Brazil) Tetê	(substituted off) 61'
FW	7	(Brazil) Taison
FW	10	(Ukraine) Júnior Moraes	37'
**Substitutes**
GK	81	(Ukraine) Anatoliy Trubin
MF	50	(Ukraine) Serhiy Bolbat
DF	5	(Georgia (country)) Davit Khocholava
MF	19	(Israel) Manor Solomon	(substituted on) 61'
MF	70	(Ukraine) Yevhen Konoplyanka	(substituted on) 69'
MF	11	(Ukraine) Marlos	(substituted on) 46'
MF	27	(Brazil) Maycon
MF	99	(Brazil) Fernando	(substituted on) 83'
MF	20	(Ukraine) Viktor Kovalenko
**Head coach**
(Portugal) Luís Castro

**Dynamo Kyiv**
GK	1	(Ukraine) Heorhiy Bushchan
MF	5	(Ukraine) Serhiy Sydorchuk (c)
MF	10	(Ukraine) Mykola Shaparenko	(yellow card) 52'
MF	14	(Uruguay) Carlos de Pena		20'	(substituted off) 74'
MF	20	(Ukraine) Oleksandr Karavayev	(yellow card) 59'
MF	22	(Luxembourg) Gerson Rodrigues		31'
DF	24	(Ukraine) Oleksandr Tymchyk
MF	29	(Ukraine) Vitaliy Buyalskyi		(substituted off) 82'
DF	34	(Ukraine) Oleksandr Syrota
FW	89	(Ukraine) Vladyslav Supriaha		(substituted off) 61'
DF	94	(Poland) Tomasz Kędziora
**Substitutes**
GK	71	(Ukraine) Denys Boyko
FW	9	(Spain) Fran Sol		(substituted on) 61'	83'
FW	11	(Ukraine) Heorhiy Tsitaishvili
MF	15	(Ukraine) Viktor Tsyhankov
MF	17	(Ukraine) Bohdan Lyednyev		(substituted on) 82'
MF	18	(Ukraine) Oleksandr Andriyevskyi		(substituted on) 74'
DF	55	(Ukraine) Kostyantyn Vivcharenko
DF	25	(Ukraine) Illya Zabarnyi
MF	99	(Denmark) Mikkel Duelund
**Head coach**
(Romania) Mircea Lucescu

Assistant referees:
Andriy Skrypka (Kropyvnytskyi)
Volodymyr Volodin (Kherson)
Fourth referee:
Anatoliy Abdula (Kharkiv)
Reserve assistant referee:
Dimitry Zaporozhenko
Video assistant referee:
Yevhen Aranovskyi (Kyiv)
Assistant video assistant referee:
Semen Shlonchak (Cherkasy)

**Match rules**

- 90 minutes of regulation.
- No extra time of regulation if score is level.
- Penalty shoot-out if scores still level.
- Nine named substitutes, of which up to five may be used in three opportunities, excluding substitutions made at half-time.
- No more than 9 foreign players on a field at one time for each team.
