= Tamás Kádár =

Hungarian footballer (born 1990)

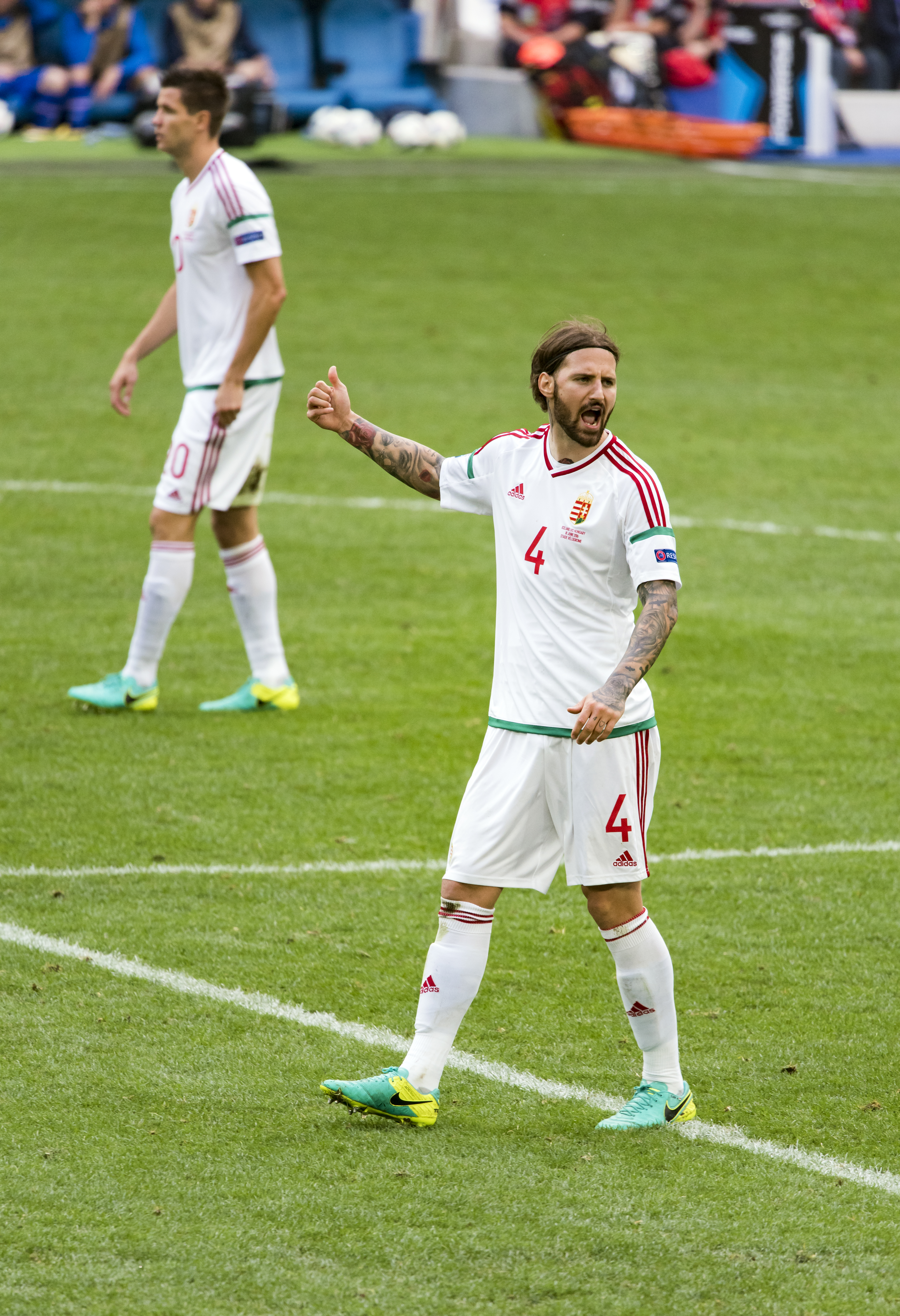
- Kádár with Hungary at the UEFA Euro 2016

Personal information
- Full name: Tamás Kádár
- Date of birth: 14 March 1990 (age 36)
- Place of birth: Veszprém, Hungary
- Height: 1.88 m (6 ft 2 in)
- Positions: Centre-back; left-back

Youth career
- 2004–2006: Zalaegerszeg

Senior career*
| Years | Team | Apps | (Gls) |
| 2006–2008 | Zalaegerszeg | 14 | (1) |
| 2008–2012 | Newcastle United | 13 | (0) |
| 2011 | → Huddersfield Town (loan) | 2 | (0) |
| 2012–2013 | Roda | 11 | (0) |
| 2013 | → Diósgyőr (loan) | 13 | (1) |
| 2013–2015 | Diósgyőr | 40 | (2) |
| 2015–2017 | Lech Poznań | 55 | (0) |
| 2017–2019 | Dynamo Kyiv | 66 | (0) |
| 2020–2022 | Shandong Luneng | 15 | (0) |
| 2021 | → Tianjin Jinmen Tiger (loan) | 16 | (0) |
| 2022 | Újpest | 2 | (0) |
| 2022–2023 | Paks | 28 | (0) |
| 2023–2026 | MTK Budapest | 87 | (1) |

International career
| 2006–2007 | Hungary U17 | 6 | (0) |
| 2007 | Hungary U19 | 3 | (0) |
| 2009–2012 | Hungary U21 | 13 | (0) |
| 2010–2019 | Hungary | 57 | (1) |
- * Club domestic league appearances and goals as of 30 May 2026

Tamás Kádár (born 14 March 1990) is a Hungarian former professional footballer. He is a defender and is equally capable at centre-back or left-back. He made his debut for Zalaegerszegi TE at the age of 16 and has since gone on to win Hungary U-21 honours.

== Club career ==
=== Zalaegerszeg ===
Kádár made his debut for Zalaegerszegi TE in 2006. He was offered trials by Premier League clubs Bolton Wanderers and Newcastle United in December 2007. He made 14 league appearances, four domestic cup appearances and two Intertoto Cup appearances for Zalaegerszegi TE.

=== Newcastle United ===
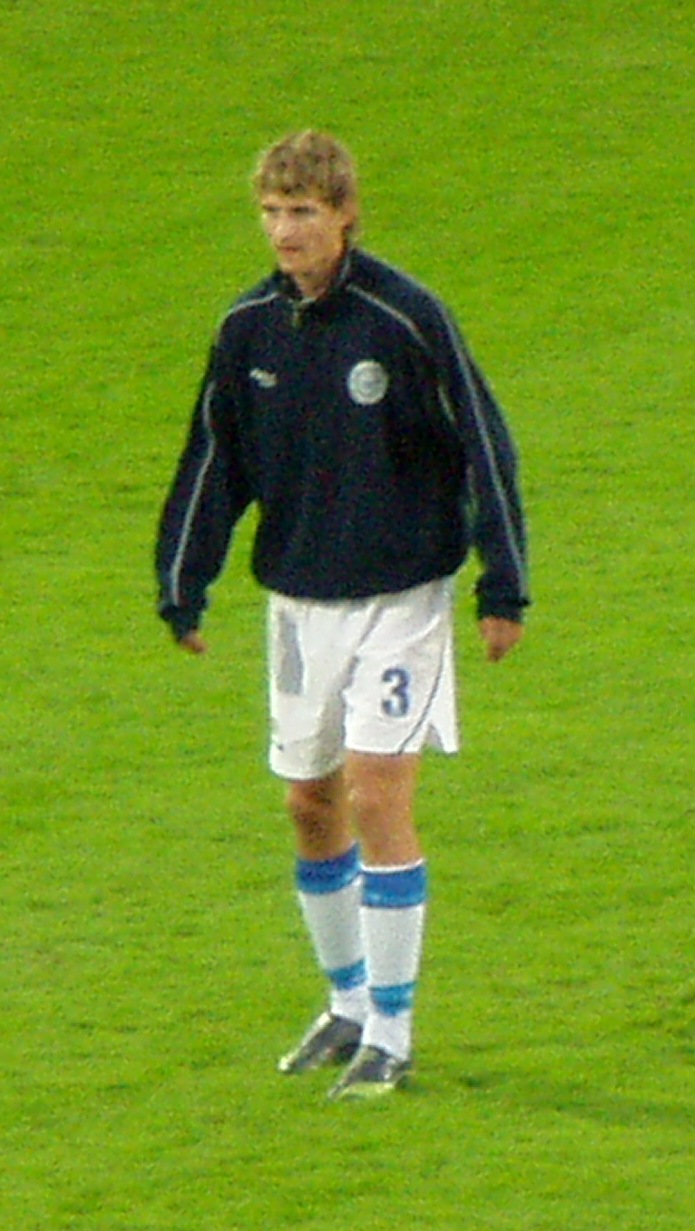
Kádár at Zalaegerszeg

Kádár's transfer was allowed due to Hungary being within the European Union. Normally a player must be 18 years old at minimum, but within the European Union players could be transferred at the age of 16.

Local news reports in Newcastle stated that Kádár had attended a reserve match at Newcastle on 8 January 2008, and would sign for the club in the coming days. Kádár became the 3rd youngster to sign for Newcastle in the January transfer window following the signings of Ben Tozer and Wesley Ngo Baheng. After some hold-ups as a result of Sam Allardyce's sacking, the deal was confirmed on 18 January, the same day that Kevin Keegan was unveiled to the press for his second stint as manager.

During the 2008–09 season, Kádár was mostly plying his trade in the reserves but appeared on the bench as an unused substitute for Newcastle's home league match with Liverpool and the FA Cup 3rd-round game with Hull City.

On 21 January 2009, he suffered a broken leg in a reserve match against Sunderland, ruling him out for six months.

On 11 July 2009, he returned to action for Newcastle United, helping in their victory 3–0 over Shamrock Rovers. This was Newcastle's first pre-season match of the 2009–10 season. He made his full first team debut in the 4–3 victory over Huddersfield Town in the League Cup in August, before making his league debut on 31 August as part of a 1–0 home win against Leicester City. Although behind Steven Taylor and Fabricio Coloccini in the pecking order, he has turned in some strong performances whenever new manager Chris Hughton played him, especially when Taylor and Coloccini were out injured during various times of the season. In the 2010–2011 season, he was given a chance in the opening rounds of the League Cup playing in central defence for their round two clash with minnows Accrington Stanley. Newcastle won 3-2 thanks to goals from Peter Lovenkrands, Shola Ameobi and Ryan Taylor. In the 2011–12 season of the Premier League Kádár became close to the first squad after the injuries of Fabricio Coloccini and Steven Taylor.

He was released by Newcastle United on 1 June 2012.

==== Huddersfield Town (loan) ====
On 10 January 2011, Kádár signed on loan at Football League One side Huddersfield Town, managed by Lee Clark, who was a coach at Newcastle, when he originally signed for the Magpies. He made his debut in the 3–2 win over Plymouth Argyle at the Galpharm Stadium, the following day. Following an injury picked up in the game at Walsall, he returned to Newcastle.

=== Roda JC Kerkrade ===
After a successful trial period, Kádár was officially signed by Dutch Eredivisie club Roda JC Kerkrade on 7 August 2012. Although in the 2012–13 season of the Eredivisie Kádár played 11 matches, he wanted to get more possibilities to play, therefore Roda loaned him to the Hungarian club Diósgyőr for the rest of the 2012–13 season.

=== Diósgyőr ===
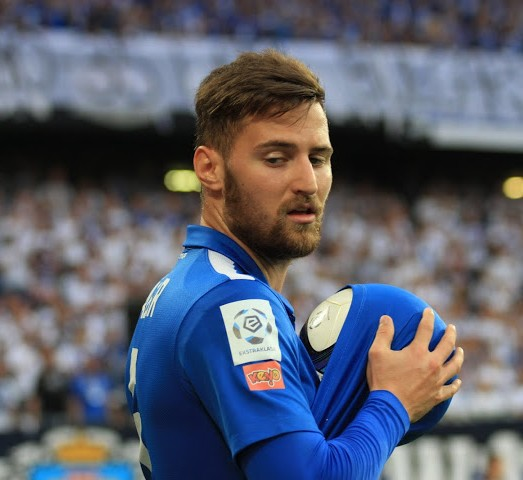
Kádár at Lech Poznan

On 3 June 2013, Kádár was signed by Hungarian League club Diósgyőri VTK after playing 13 matches and scoring 1 goal in the 2012–13 season of the Hungarian League on loan from Roda JC Kerkade.

=== Lech Poznań ===
On 29 January 2015, Kádár was signed by Ekstraklasa club Lech Poznań. He signed a three-and-a-half-year contract with the Polish club.

In the 2015–16 Ekstraklasa season Kádár made 29, and 4 2015–16 Polish Cup appearances.

=== Dynamo Kyiv ===
On 10 February 2017, Kádár signed a four-year contract with the Ukrainian champions Dynamo Kyiv.

=== Újpest ===
On 10 February 2022, Kádár returned to Hungary and signed with Újpest.

=== Paks ===
On 14 July 2022, Kádár signed with Paks.

=== MTK Budapest ===
On 15 June 2023, it was announced that Kádár had signed a contract with MTK Budapest. On 15 May 2026, he played his lats match in a 2–2 draw against Puskás Akadémia FC at the Pancho Aréna, in Felcsút.

== International career ==
On 12 May 2008, Kádár received his first call up to the Hungary senior squad, though he did not make an appearance. He was recalled to the U21 side for several 2011 European Championship qualifiers. On 17 November 2010 Kádár played his first match for the national team against Lithuania at the Stadion Sóstói in Székesfehérvár, Hungary. The final result was 2–0 to Hungary. He also played in the match that resulted in the 5–0 victory over Liechtenstein at the Puskás Ferenc Stadium in Hungary.

Kádár gained a reputation of a defender who, while moving up on the left side from defense, could successfully spot and assist a quick attack: on 16 October 2012 against Turkey he gave an assist to Szalai which resulted in the second Hungarian goal, he provided an assist to Dániel Böde against the Faroe Islands, and to Tamás Priskin against Norway.

Kádár was selected for Hungary's Euro 2016 squad.

On 14 June 2016, Kádár played in the first group match in a 2–0 victory over Austria at the UEFA Euro 2016 Group F match at Nouveau Stade de Bordeaux, Bordeaux, France. Three days later, on 18 June 2016, he played in a 1–1 draw against Iceland at the Stade Vélodrome, Marseille.

== Image ==
Upon his arrival to the Ekstraklasa club Lech Poznań, he was nicknamed Bad boy by the fans of the club for resembling Jesse Pinkman from the AMC TV series Breaking Bad. He is known for his multitude of tattoos, which he started collecting as a hobby after his club banned him from riding a motorcycle.

== Career statistics ==
=== Club ===
As of match played 20 December 2025

Appearances and goals by club, season and competition
| Club | Season | League | | | National cup (Note: Includes Magyar Kupa, FA Cup, KNVB Cup, Polish Cup, Ukrainian Cup, Chinese FA Cup) | | League cup (Note: Includes Ligakupa, EFL Cup) | | Continental | | Other | | Total | |
| Club | Season | Division | Apps | Goals | Apps | Goals | Apps | Goals | Apps | Goals | Apps | Goals | Apps | Goals |
|---|---|---|---|---|---|---|---|---|---|---|---|---|---|---|
| Zalaegerszeg | 2006–07 | Nemzeti Bajnokság I | 5 | 0 | 3 | 0 | 0 | 0 | 0 | 0 | — | | 8 | 0 |
| Zalaegerszeg | 2007–08 | Nemzeti Bajnokság I | 9 | 1 | 0 | 0 | 4 | 0 | 2 (Note: Appearances in UEFA Intertoto Cup) | 0 | — | | 15 | 1 |
| Zalaegerszeg | Total | | 14 | 1 | 3 | 0 | 4 | 0 | 2 | 0 | — | | 23 | 1 |
| Newcastle United | 2007–08 | Premier League | 0 | 0 | 0 | 0 | 0 | 0 | — | | — | | 0 | 0 |
| Newcastle United | 2008–09 | Premier League | 0 | 0 | 0 | 0 | 0 | 0 | — | | — | | 0 | 0 |
| Newcastle United | 2009–10 | EFL Championship | 13 | 0 | 2 | 0 | 1 | 0 | — | | — | | 16 | 0 |
| Newcastle United | 2010–11 | Premier League | 0 | 0 | 0 | 0 | 2 | 0 | — | | — | | 2 | 0 |
| Newcastle United | 2011–12 | Premier League | 0 | 0 | 0 | 0 | 0 | 0 | — | | — | | 0 | 0 |
| Newcastle United | Total | | 13 | 0 | 2 | 0 | 3 | 0 | — | | — | | 18 | 0 |
| Huddersfield Town (loan) | 2010–11 | EFL League One | 2 | 0 | 0 | 0 | 0 | 0 | — | | — | | 2 | 0 |
| Roda | 2012–13 | Eredivisie | 11 | 0 | 1 | 0 | 0 | 0 | — | | — | | 12 | 0 |
| Diósgyőr | 2012–13 | Nemzeti Bajnokság I | 13 | 1 | 0 | 0 | 0 | 0 | — | | — | | 13 | 1 |
| Diósgyőr | 2013–14 | Nemzeti Bajnokság I | 24 | 1 | 8 | 0 | 5 | 0 | — | | — | | 37 | 1 |
| Diósgyőr | 2014–15 | Nemzeti Bajnokság I | 16 | 0 | 0 | 0 | 1 | 0 | 6 (Note: Appearance(s) in UEFA Europa League) | 0 | — | | 23 | 0 |
| Diósgyőr | Total | | 53 | 2 | 8 | 0 | 6 | 0 | 6 | 0 | — | | 73 | 2 |
| Lech Poznań | 2014–15 | Ekstraklasa | 9 | 0 | 3 | 0 | — | | — | | — | | 12 | 0 |
| Lech Poznań | 2015–16 | Ekstraklasa | 29 | 0 | 4 | 0 | — | | 10 (Note: Three appearances in UEFA Champions League, seven appearances in UEFA Europa League) | 0 | 1 (Note: Appearance in Polish Super Cup) | 0 | 44 | 0 |
| Lech Poznań | 2016–17 | Ekstraklasa | 17 | 0 | 2 | 0 | — | | — | | 0 | 0 | 19 | 0 |
| Lech Poznań | Total | | 55 | 0 | 9 | 0 | — | | 10 | 0 | 1 | 0 | 75 | 0 |
| Dynamo Kyiv | 2016–17 | Ukrainian Premier League | 10 | 0 | 3 | 1 | — | | — | | — | | 13 | 1 |
| Dynamo Kyiv | 2017–18 | Ukrainian Premier League | 21 | 0 | 2 | 0 | – | | 13 (Note: Two appearances in UEFA Champions League, eleven appearances in UEFA Europa League) | 0 | — | | 30 | 0 |
| Dynamo Kyiv | 2018–19 | Ukrainian Premier League | 22 | 0 | 1 | 0 | — | | 11 (Note: Four appearances in UEFA Champions League, seven appearances in UEFA Europa League) | 0 | 1 (Note: Appearance in Ukrainian Super Cup) | 0 | 35 | 0 |
| Dynamo Kyiv | 2019–20 | Ukrainian Premier League | 13 | 0 | 0 | 0 | — | | 6 (Note: Two appearances in UEFA Champions League, four appearances in UEFA Europa League) | 0 | 1 | 0 | 20 | 0 |
| Dynamo Kyiv | Total | | 66 | 0 | 6 | 1 | — | | 30 | 0 | 2 | 0 | 104 | 0 |
| Shandong Luneng | 2020 | Chinese Super League | 15 | 0 | 1 | 0 | — | | — | | — | | 16 | 0 |
| Tianjin Jinmen Tiger (loan) | 2021 | Chinese Super League | 16 | 0 | 0 | 0 | — | | — | | — | | 16 | 0 |
| Újpest | 2021–22 | Nemzeti Bajnokság I | 2 | 0 | 1 | 0 | — | | — | | — | | 3 | 0 |
| Paks | 2022–23 | Nemzeti Bajnokság I | 28 | 0 | 2 | 0 | — | | — | | — | | 30 | 0 |
| MTK Budapest | 2023–24 | Nemzeti Bajnokság I | 30 | 0 | 3 | 0 | — | | — | | — | | 33 | 0 |
| MTK Budapest | 2024–25 | Nemzeti Bajnokság I | 26 | 1 | 4 | 0 | — | | — | | — | | 30 | 1 |
| MTK Budapest | 2025–26 | Nemzeti Bajnokság I | 18 | 0 | 0 | 0 | — | | — | | — | | 18 | 0 |
| MTK Budapest | Total | | 74 | 1 | 7 | 0 | — | | — | | — | | 81 | 1 |
| Career total | | | 349 | 4 | 40 | 1 | 13 | 0 | 48 | 0 | 3 | 0 | 453 | 5 |

=== International ===
As of 21 June 2019

Appearances and goals by national team and year
| National team | Year | Apps | Goals |
|---|---|---|---|
| Hungary | 2010 | 1 | 0 |
| Hungary | 2011 | 1 | 0 |
| Hungary | 2012 | 5 | 0 |
| Hungary | 2013 | 8 | 0 |
| Hungary | 2014 | 5 | 0 |
| Hungary | 2015 | 8 | 0 |
| Hungary | 2016 | 9 | 0 |
| Hungary | 2017 | 8 | 1 |
| Hungary | 2018 | 8 | 0 |
| Hungary | 2019 | 4 | 0 |
| Total | | 57 | 1 |

Scores and results list Hungary's goal tally first, score column indicates score after each Kádár goal.

List of international goals scored by Tamás Kádár
| No. | Date | Venue | Opponent | Score | Result | Competition |
|---|---|---|---|---|---|---|
| 1 | 31 August 2017 | Groupama Arena, Budapest, Hungary | Latvia | 1–0 | 3–1 | 2018 FIFA World Cup qualification |

== Honours ==
Newcastle United

- Football League Championship: 2009–10

Diósgyőr

- Hungarian League Cup: 2013–14

Lech Poznań

- Ekstraklasa: 2014-15
- Polish Super Cup: 2015

Dynamo Kyiv

- Ukrainian Super Cup: 2018, 2019

Shandong Luneng

- Chinese FA Cup: 2020
