= Alyaksandr Khatskevich =

Belarusian footballer (born 1973)

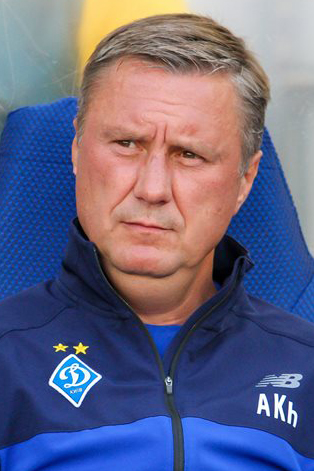
- Khatskevich with Dynamo Kyiv in 2018

Personal information
- Full name: Alyaksandr Mikalayevich Khatskevich
- Date of birth: 19 October 1973 (age 53)
- Place of birth: Minsk, Byelorussian SSR, Soviet Union
- Height: 1.87 m (6 ft 2 in)
- Position: Midfielder

Youth career
- 1990–1991: Dinamo Minsk

Senior career*
Years	Team	Apps	(Gls)
1992	Dinamo-2 Minsk	14	(3)
1992–1996	Dinamo Minsk	90	(18)
1996–2004	Dynamo Kyiv	135	(26)
1996–2004	→ Dynamo-2 Kyiv	54	(14)
1997	→ Dynamo-3 Kyiv	1	(0)
2004	Tianjin Teda	10	(1)
2005	Venta Ventspils	4	(0)
2005–2007	Dinamo Minsk	34	(6)
Total		342	(68)

International career
1992–1995	Belarus U21	11	(2)
1993–2005	Belarus	38	(4)

Managerial career
- 2006: Dinamo Minsk (caretaker)
- 2007: Dinamo Minsk (player-manager)
- 2008: Belarus U18
- 2008–2009: Vitebsk
- 2010: Ukraine (assistant)
- 2010–2013: Dynamo Kyiv (youth)
- 2013–2014: Dynamo-2 Kyiv
- 2014–2016: Belarus
- 2017–2019: Dynamo Kyiv
- 2019–2021: Rotor Volgograd
- 2022: Karmiotissa
- 2024: Zagłębie Sosnowiec
- 2025–: Polissya Zhytomyr (Vice-president)
- * Club domestic league appearances and goals

Alyaksandr Mikalayevich Khatskevich (Belarusian: Аляксандр Мікалаевіч Хацкевіч, born 19 October 1973) is a Belarusian professional football manager and former player who was most recently in charge of Polish club Zagłębie Sosnowiec.

== Playing career ==
Khatskevich is a former player of the Ukrainian club Dynamo Kyiv.

He made 39 appearances and scored four goals for the Belarus national team from 1993 to 2005.

== Managerial career ==
After Khatskevich retired from playing, Khatskevich became a football coach. At age 33, his former club, Dinamo Minsk appointed him to replace Pyotr Kachura after the first match of the 2007 Belarusian Premier League season.

From December 2014 until December 2016, he was the head coach of Belarus national team.

On 20 December 2019, he signed with Russian Football National League club Rotor Volgograd. The club only played two games after the resumption of the 2019–20 season after the winter break and then the season was abandoned due to the COVID-19 pandemic in Russia. As Rotor were leading the league at the time of abandonment, the club was promoted to the Russian Premier League. He was dismissed by Rotor on 19 March 2021, with the club in the 13th position in the league.

On 16 January 2024, Khatskevich was appointed manager of last-placed Polish I liga outfit Zagłębie Sosnowiec. On 1 April, during a press conference following a 0–4 home loss to GKS Katowice, he jokingly agreed for the media to send him tactical suggestions to use in future games, and stated he let the players set their own strategy for the lost match, a claim which was refuted by one of Zagłębie's players Kamil Biliński on X the following day. On 3 April, amid allegations of verbal abuse and poor treatment of players by the Belarusian, it was reported that Khatskevich, along with several players, was physically attacked by hooligans on club grounds during a training session. He left the club by mutual consent on 5 April 2024.

In September 2025, he was appointed Vice President of Polissya Zhytomyr by decision of club president Hennadiy Butkevych.

== Personal life ==
His son Artyom Khatskevich is also a footballer, who played for FC Desna Chernihiv youth team and most recently playing for Czech side TJ Spohe Praha.

== Career statistics ==
Scores and results list Belarus' goal tally first, score column indicates score after each Khatskevich goal.

List of international goals scored by Alyaksandr Khatskevich
No.	Date	Venue	Opponent	Score	Result	Competition
1	2 September 2000	Dinamo Stadium, Minsk, Belarus	Wales	1–0	2–1	2002 FIFA World Cup qualification
2	11 October 2000	Dinamo Stadium, Minsk, Belarus	Armenia	1–0	2–1	2002 FIFA World Cup qualification
3	28 March 2001	Dinamo Stadium, Minsk, Belarus	Norway	1–0	2–1	2002 FIFA World Cup qualification
4	17 April 2002	Stadion Oláh Gábor Út, Debrecen, Hungary	Hungary	4–1	5–2	Friendly

== Managerial statistics ==
As of 3 April 2024

Team	From	To	Record				
Team	From	To	G	W	D	L	Win %
Dynamo Minsk (played-coach)	9 April 2007	12 November 2007	30	9	13	8	30.00
FK Vitebsk	26 July 2008	20 July 2009	31	11	7	13	35.48
Belarus	4 December 2014	December 2016	18	6	6	6	33.33
Dynamo Kyiv	2 June 2017	14 August 2019	115	66	28	21	57.39
Rotor Volgograd	20 December 2019	19 March 2021	26	5	7	14	19.23
Karmiotissa	18 September 2022	31 October 2022	6	3	1	2	50.00
Zagłębie Sosnowiec	16 January 2024	5 April 2024	6	0	2	4	0.00
Total			232	100	64	68	43.10

== Honours ==
=== Player ===
Dinamo Minsk

- Belarusian Premier League: 1992–93, 1993–94, 1994–95, 1995, 1996
- Belarusian Cup: 1993–94

Dynamo Kyiv

- Ukrainian Premier League: 1996–97, 1997–98, 1998–99, 1999–2000, 2000–01, 2002–03, 2003–04
- Ukrainian Cup: 1997–98, 1998–99, 1999–2000, 2002–03
- Ukrainian Super Cup: 2004

Individual

- Belarusian Footballer of the Year: 1998, 2000

=== Manager ===
Dynamo Kyiv

- Ukrainian Super Cup: 2018, 2019
