= Vitaliy Buyalskyi =

Ukrainian footballer

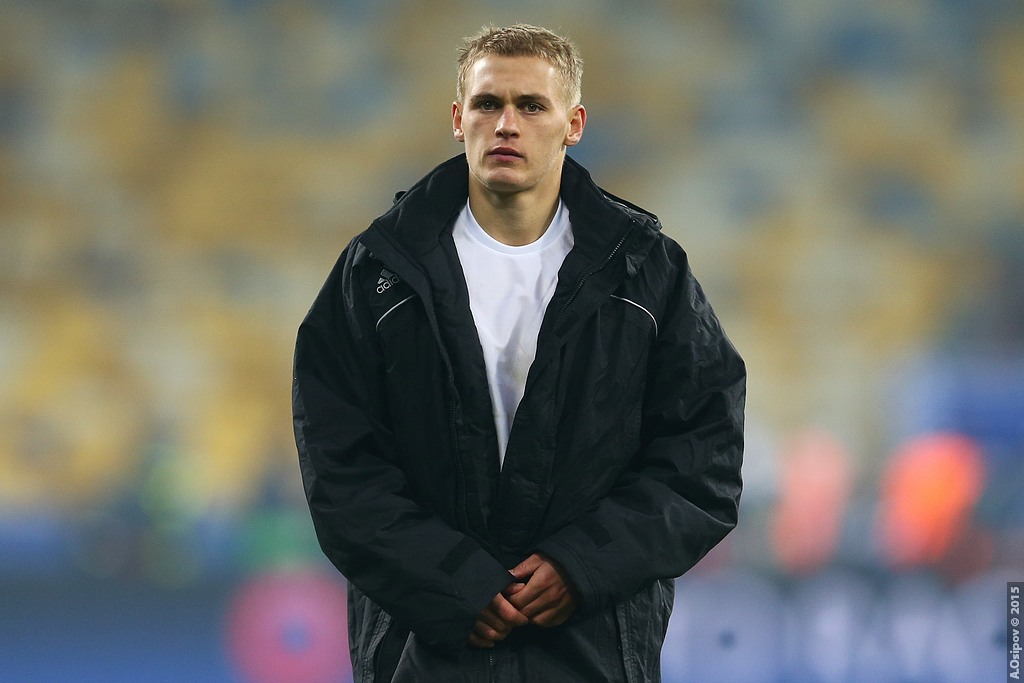
- Buyalskyi in 2015

Personal information
- Full name: Vitaliy Kazymyrovych Buyalskyi
- Date of birth: 6 January 1993 (age 33)
- Place of birth: Kalynivka, Ukraine
- Height: 1.70 m (5 ft 7 in)
- Position: Midfielder

Team information
- Current team: Dynamo Kyiv
- Number: 29

Youth career
- 2006–2010: RVUFK Kyiv

Senior career*
| Years | Team | Apps | (Gls) |
| 2010– | Dynamo Kyiv | 269 | (69) |
| 2013–2014 | → Hoverla Uzhhorod (loan) | 20 | (3) |

International career^{‡}
| 2010–2011 | Ukraine U18 | 8 | (3) |
| 2010–2012 | Ukraine U19 | 16 | (2) |
| 2012 | Ukraine U20 | 2 | (2) |
| 2012–2014 | Ukraine U21 | 9 | (1) |
| 2017– | Ukraine | 13 | (0) |
- * Club domestic league appearances and goals as of 31 August 2026 ‡ National team caps and goals as of 17 October 2023

Vitaliy Kazymyrovych Buyalskyi (Ukrainian: Віта́лій Казими́рович Буя́льський; born 6 January 1993) is a Ukrainian professional footballer who plays as a midfielder for Dynamo Kyiv and the Ukraine national team.

== Club career ==
=== Dynamo Kyiv ===
After playing for some time for Dynamo Kyiv youth teams, Buyalskyi made his senior team debut on 21 September 2011, playing the last five minutes in the Ukrainian Cup away match against FC Kremin Kremenchuk. His next appearance for Dynamo had to wait until 26 May 2013, when he made his Ukrainian Premier League debut against Metalurh Zaporizhya.

The following season saw Buyalskyi go on a successful loan spell to Hoverla Uzhhorod, where he played in 20 games. Upon returning to Dynamo for the 2014–15 season, Buyalskyi was given a much larger role than before, featuring in a total of 23 matches, including 7 appearances in that season's edition of the UEFA Europa League.

On 16 September 2015, Buyalskyi made his UEFA Champions League debut in a 2–2 draw against Portuguese club Porto in the group stage. He also scored his first-ever goal in the competition in the 89th minute which gave Dynamo the draw.

On 21 July 2018, Buyalskyi scored the only goal of the game as Dynamo defeated rivals Shakhtar Donetsk in the 2018 Ukrainian Super Cup.

In February 2021, Buyalskyi scored in both leg's of Dynamo's UEFA Europa League Round of 32 clash against Belgian side Club Brugge to lead his side to a 2–1 aggregate victory and secure passage into the last 16. On 21 April 2021, Buyalskyi scored his first ever goal in the Ukrainian Cup as Dynamo defeated second division club Ahrobiznes Volochysk 3–0 in the semi-final. Dynamo would eventually go on to defeat Zorya Luhansk in the final to earn the league and cup double.

== International career ==
Buyalskyi was named in the 31-player senior national squad for the 2018 FIFA World Cup qualification match against Iceland on 5 September 2016. He made his debut on 6 October 2017 at Loro Boriçi Stadium in Shkodër, Albania, as a late substitute in Ukraine's 2–0 FIFA World Cup qualifying victory over Kosovo.

== Career statistics ==
=== Club ===
As of 31 August 2026

| Club | Season | League | | | Ukrainian Cup | | Continental | | Other | | Total | |
| Club | Season | Division | Apps | Goals | Apps | Goals | Apps | Goals | Apps | Goals | Apps | Goals |
|---|---|---|---|---|---|---|---|---|---|---|---|---|
| Dynamo Kyiv | 2011–12 | Ukrainian Premier League | 0 | 0 | 1 | 0 | 0 | 0 | 0 | 0 | 1 | 0 |
| Dynamo Kyiv | 2012–13 | Ukrainian Premier League | 1 | 0 | 0 | 0 | 0 | 0 | — | | 1 | 0 |
| Dynamo Kyiv | 2014–15 | Ukrainian Premier League | 11 | 2 | 5 | 0 | 7 (Note: Appearances in UEFA Europa League) | 1 | 0 | 0 | 23 | 3 |
| Dynamo Kyiv | 2015–16 | Ukrainian Premier League | 18 | 2 | 3 | 0 | 7 (Note: Appearances in UEFA Champions League) | 2 | 0 | 0 | 28 | 4 |
| Dynamo Kyiv | 2016–17 | Ukrainian Premier League | 21 | 1 | 2 | 0 | 4 | 1 | 1 (Note: Appearance in Ukrainian Super Cup) | 0 | 28 | 2 |
| Dynamo Kyiv | 2017–18 | Ukrainian Premier League | 26 | 4 | 2 | 0 | 13 (Note: Two appearances in UEFA Champions League, eleven appearances in UEFA Europa League) | 2 | 1 | 0 | 42 | 6 |
| Dynamo Kyiv | 2018–19 | Ukrainian Premier League | 22 | 3 | 2 | 0 | 11 (Note: Four appearances in UEFA Champions League, seven appearances in UEFA Europa League) | 2 | 1 | 1 | 36 | 6 |
| Dynamo Kyiv | 2019–20 | Ukrainian Premier League | 27 | 9 | 3 | 0 | 6 (Note: Two appearances and one goal in UEFA Champions League, four appearances and one goal in UEFA Europa League) | 2 | 1 | 0 | 37 | 11 |
| Dynamo Kyiv | 2020–21 | Ukrainian Premier League | 20 | 5 | 3 | 1 | 11 (Note: Seven appearances and one goal in UEFA Champions League, four appearances and two goals in UEFA Europa League) | 3 | 1 | 0 | 35 | 9 |
| Dynamo Kyiv | 2021–22 | Ukrainian Premier League | 16 | 9 | 0 | 0 | 5 | 0 | 1 | 0 | 22 | 9 |
| Dynamo Kyiv | 2022–23 | Ukrainian Premier League | 27 | 12 | 0 | 0 | 12 (Note: Six appearances and one goal in UEFA Champions League, six appearances in UEFA Europa League) | 1 | – | | 39 | 13 |
| Dynamo Kyiv | 2023–24 | Ukrainian Premier League | 23 | 10 | 1 | 0 | 4 (Note: Appearances in UEFA Conference League) | 0 | – | | 28 | 10 |
| Dynamo Kyiv | 2024–25 | Ukrainian Premier League | 29 | 7 | 3 | 0 | 8 (Note: Four appearances in UEFA Champions League, four appearances in UEFA Europa League) | 0 | – | | 40 | 7 |
| Dynamo Kyiv | 2025–26 | Ukrainian Premier League | 25 | 6 | 5 | 2 | 7 (Note: Three appearances and one goal in UEFA Champions League, one appearance in UEFA Europa League, three appearances and one goal in UEFA Conference League) | 2 | – | | 37 | 10 |
| Dynamo Kyiv | 2026–27 | Ukrainian Premier League | 3 | 0 | 0 | 0 | 5 (Note: Four appearances in UEFA Europa League, one appearance in UEFA Conference League) | 0 | – | | 8 | 0 |
| Dynamo Kyiv | Total | | 269 | 70 | 30 | 3 | 100 | 16 | 6 | 1 | 405 | 90 |
| Hoverla Uzhhorod (loan) | 2013–14 | Ukrainian Premier League | 20 | 3 | 0 | 0 | — | | — | | 20 | 3 |
| Career total | | | 289 | 73 | 30 | 3 | 100 | 16 | 6 | 1 | 425 | 93 |

=== International ===
As of 12 September 2023

| National team | Year | Caps | Goals |
|---|---|---|---|
| Ukraine | 2017 | 1 | 0 |
| Ukraine | 2018 | 3 | 0 |
| Ukraine | 2019 | 4 | 0 |
| Ukraine | 2021 | 1 | 0 |
| Ukraine | 2023 | 4 | 0 |
| Total | | 13 | 0 |

== Honours ==
Dynamo Kyiv

- Ukrainian Premier League: 2014–15, 2015–16, 2020–21, 2024–25
- Ukrainian Cup: 2014–15, 2019–20, 2020–21, 2025–26
- Ukrainian Super Cup: 2016, 2018, 2019, 2020

Individual

- Ukrainian Premier League player of the Month: 2019–20 (June)
- SportArena Player of the Round: 2025–26 (Round 4),
