= 2019 Ukrainian Super Cup =

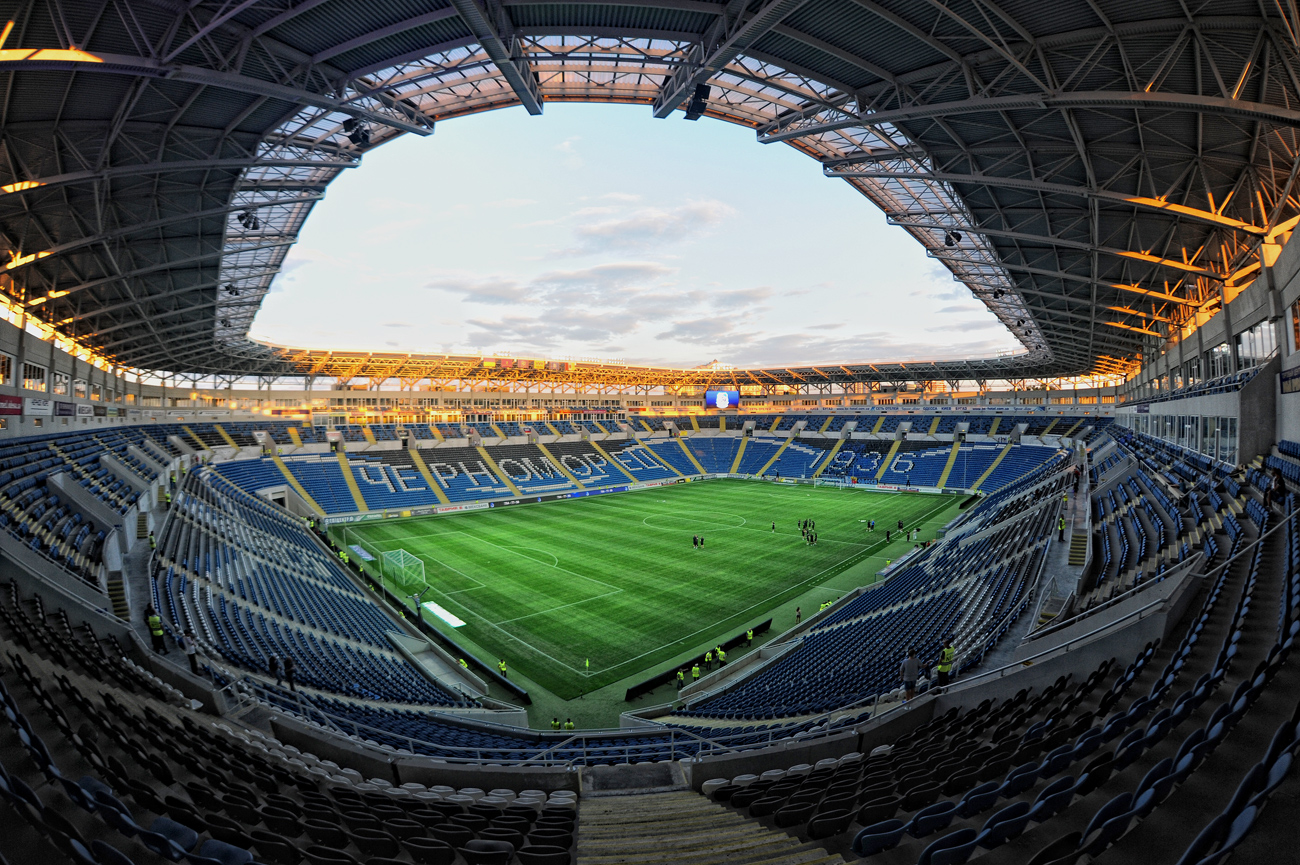
Dynamo Kyiv	Shakhtar Donetsk
2	1
- Date: 28 July 2019
- Venue: Chornomorets Stadium, Odesa
- Referee: Vitaliy Romanov (Dnipro)
- Attendance: 27,400
- Weather: 27°C

The 2019 Ukrainian Super Cup became the 16th edition of Ukrainian Super Cup, an annual season opener football match contested by the winners of the previous season's Ukrainian Top League and Ukrainian Cup competitions or the league's runner-up if the National Cup was won also by league champions.

Originally scheduled on 21 July 2019, the match was played at the Chornomorets Stadium, Odesa, on 28 July 2019 due to the Ukrainian parliamentary elections which were scheduled on 21st. The game was contested by league and cup winner Shakhtar Donetsk and league runner-up Dynamo Kyiv.

== Preparations and other background events ==
The game will be broadcast on Futbol 1 of "Ukrayina" television channel. According to the UPL website, the stadium is expected to be full. The game for the first time will be shown at the Polish TVP Sport.

The main news for Shakhtar this summer became the arrival of new mentor. The Portuguese expert Luís Castro replaced at this post Paulo Fonseca who left for Rome. New contract with Dynamo was signed by Alyaksandr Khatskevich who has been the club's head coach for couple of seasons. It is expected that Oleksandr Karavayev a former graduate of the Shakhtar's academy will play for Dynamo.

The victory in the game is important for each team as well as their coaches. Castro wants to start his coaching career in Shakhtar with a win and a trophy, while Khatskevich wants to return his team a confidence and a win over its main opponent could become a better medicine for it.

In interview to the Dynamo's website, the Dynamo's defender Tamas Kadar said that "Everyone knows that the game with Shakhtar won't be easy. It is a great team with top notch players. But we have our own advantages. Uncompromising struggle awaits us, we give it all we can on the field. We want to please our fans and will do everything to win trophy."

In interview to the Shakhtar's website on the question what he expects from the new season, the Shakhtar's midfielder Manor Solomon said that he would like as in previous to take the championship gold and the Cup. "And also we set the task to successfully perform in the UEFA Champion's League by finishing at least the second in a group and advancing to play-offs. But the first goal is to win the Supercup. I want to invite fans of Shakhtar from all Ukraine come to the stadium and support us in the principle duel. We will be glad to see you!"

== Previous encounters ==
Before this game both teams met in the Ukrainian Super Cup eleven (11) times, the first being back in 2004. Before this game out of the previous eleven both teams won equally 3 games each, five more games were tied and led to penalty shootout three of which were won by Dynamo and two were won by Shakhtar.

=== Comparison table ===
Team	Qualification	Previous appearances (bold indicates winners)
Shakhtar Donetsk	2018–19 UPL / 2018–19 Cup winners	14 (2004, **2005**, 2006, 2007, **2008**, **2010**, 2011, **2012**, **2013**, **2014**, **2015**, 2016, **2017**, 2018)
Dynamo Kyiv^{TH}	2018–19 UPL runners-up	12 (**2004**, 2005, **2006**, **2007**, 2008, **2009**, **2011**, 2014, 2015, **2016**, 2017, **2018**)

== Match ==
=== Details ===
28 July 2019
21:00 EEST

Dynamo Kyiv	2–1	Shakhtar Donetsk
Burda 80'; Harmash 83'	Report	Patrick 45+2'

Chornomorets Stadium, Odesa
Attendance: 27,400
Referee: Vitaliy Romanov (Dnipro)

**Dynamo Kyiv**	**Shakhtar Donetsk**

**Dynamo Kyiv**
GK	71	(Ukraine) Denys Boyko
DF	16	(Ukraine) Vitaliy Mykolenko
DF	26	(Ukraine) Mykyta Burda	80'
DF	44	(Hungary) Tamás Kádár	(yellow card) 72'
DF	94	(Poland) Tomasz Kędziora
MF	7	(Slovenia) Benjamin Verbič		(substituted off) 73'
MF	8	(Ukraine) Volodymyr Shepelyev
DF	19	(Ukraine) Denys Harmash	83'	(substituted off) 84'
MF	20	(Ukraine) Oleksandr Karavayev		(substituted off) 68'
DF	29	(Ukraine) Vitaliy Buyalskyi (c)	(yellow card) 45'
FW	41	(Ukraine) Artem Besyedin
**Substitutes**
GK	1	(Ukraine) Heorhiy Bushchan
DF	4	(Ukraine) Denys Popov
MF	5	(Ukraine) Serhiy Sydorchuk		(substituted on) 84'
MF	6	(Ghana) Mohammed Kadiri
FW	11	(Ukraine) Heorhiy Tsitaishvili		(substituted on) 73'
MF	14	(Uruguay) Carlos de Pena		(substituted on) 68'
DF	23	(Croatia) Josip Pivarić
**Head coach**
(Belarus) Alyaksandr Khatskevich

**Shakhtar Donetsk**
GK	30	(Ukraine) Andriy Pyatov
DF	50	(Ukraine) Serhiy Bolbat
DF	4	(Ukraine) Serhiy Kryvtsov
DF	5	(Georgia (country)) Davit Khocholava	(yellow card) 29'
DF	31	(Brazil) Ismaily
MF	6	(Ukraine) Taras Stepanenko
MF	21	(Brazil) Alan Patrick	45+2'	(substituted off) 87'
MF	19	(Israel) Manor Solomon		(substituted off) 66'
MF	7	(Brazil) Taison (c)
MF	11	(Ukraine) Marlos
FW	10	(Ukraine) Júnior Moraes
**Substitutes**
GK	1	(Ukraine) Oleksiy Shevchenko
DF	22	(Ukraine) Mykola Matviyenko
MF	76	(Ukraine) Oleksandr Pikhalyonok
MF	8	(Brazil) Marcos Antônio
MF	9	(Brazil) Dentinho		(substituted on) 87'
MF	14	(Brazil) Tetê		(substituted on) 66'
FW	45	(Ukraine) Danylo Sikan
**Head coach**
(Portugal) Luís Castro

Assistant referees:
Oleksandr Voityuk (Zaporizhzhia)
Volodymyr Volodin (Kherson)
Fourth referee:
Anatoliy Abdula (Kharkiv)
Reserve assistant referee:
Semen Shlonchak
Video assistant referee:
Yevhen Aranovskyi (Kyiv)
Assistant video assistant referee:
Oleksandr Skrypka (Kropyvnytskyi)

**Match rules**

- 90 minutes of regulation.
- No extra time of regulation if score is level.
- Penalty shoot-out if scores still level.
- Seven named substitutes, of which up to three may be used.
- No more than 9 foreign players on a field at one time for each team.
