= Carlos de Pena =

Uruguayan footballer (born 1992)

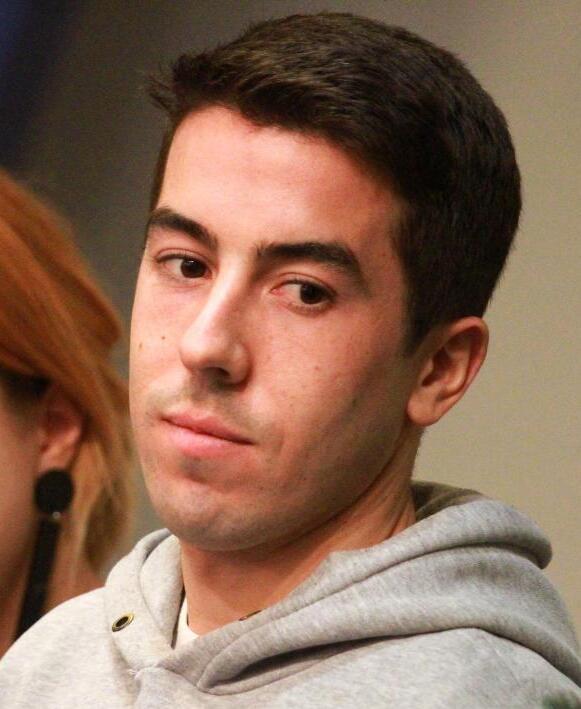

Personal information
- Full name: Carlos María de Pena Bonino
- Date of birth: 11 March 1992 (age 34)
- Place of birth: Montevideo, Uruguay
- Height: 1.77 m (5 ft 10 in)
- Position: Attacking midfielder

Team information
- Current team: Sport Recife
- Number: 10

Youth career
- 1997–2002: La Estacada
- 2002–2004: Mirador Rosado
- 2005–2012: Nacional

Senior career*
Years	Team	Apps	(Gls)
2012–2015	Nacional	58	(15)
2015–2017	Middlesbrough	6	(0)
2017	→ Oviedo (loan)	7	(1)
2018–2019	Nacional	14	(1)
2019–2022	Dynamo Kyiv	71	(15)
2022–2024	Internacional	61	(7)
2024	Bahia	30	(0)
2025	Coritiba	29	(1)
2026–	Sport Recife	28	(3)
- * Club domestic league appearances and goals as of 16 November 2026

Carlos María de Pena Bonino (born 11 March 1992) is a Uruguayan professional footballer who plays as a defensive midfielder or left midfielder for Campeonato Brasileiro Série B club Sport Recife.

== Club career ==
=== Nacional ===
De Pena made was born in Montevideo. He his official debut for Nacional on 19 February 2013, in the Copa Libertadores match against Toluca at Estadio Nemesio Díez, which ended in a 3–2 victory for the away side.

=== Middlesbrough ===
De Pena was involved in a car accident on his way to the airport before his reported £2.6m move to Middlesbrough. He is predominantly a left-winger but has been deployed in a variety of roles throughout his career, including left-back and centre-forward.

He made his first competitive debut for Boro on 22 September 2015 in a 3–0 victory in the third round of the League Cup against Wolverhampton Wanderers at the Riverside Stadium.

On 31 January 2017, de Pena was loaned to Spanish Segunda División side Real Oviedo, until the end of the season.

De Pena's contract was terminated by mutual consent on 19 July 2017, putting an end to a two-year stay in which he only made 11 first team appearances.

=== Return to Nacional ===
De Pena re-signed for Club Nacional de Football in January 2018. After one year at the club, he left again.

=== Dynamo Kyiv ===
On 10 April 2019, de Pena signed for Ukrainian Premier League vice champions Dynamo Kyiv as a free agent. With the club he won the 2019–20 Ukrainian Cup and the 2019 and 2020 Ukrainian Super Cups. On 17 April 2021, he scored the winning goal by penalty during the derby against Shakhtar Donetsk in the 2020–21 season at the NSC Olimpiyskiy. On 25 April 2021, he won the league with Dynamo Kyiv.

=== Internacional ===
On 1 April 2022, de Pena moved to Internacional and signed a loan contract until the end of the year.

== Career statistics ==
As of 30 October 2021

Appearances and goals by club, season and competition
Club	Season	League			Cup		League Cup		Continental		Other		Total	
Club	Season	Division	Apps	Goals	Apps	Goals	Apps	Goals	Apps	Goals	Apps	Goals	Apps	Goals
Nacional	2012–13	Uruguayan Primera División	6	1	—		—		4 (Note: Appearance(s) in Copa Libertadores)	0	—		10	1
Nacional	2013–14	Uruguayan Primera División	24	3	—		—		6	2	—		30	5
Nacional	2014–15	Uruguayan Primera División	26	9	—		—		2	0	—		28	9
Nacional	2015–16	Uruguayan Primera División	2	2	—		—		3 (Note: Appearance(s) in Copa Sudamericana)	0	—		5	2
Nacional	Total		58	15	—		—		15	2	—		73	17
Middlesbrough	2015–16	EFL Championship	6	0	1	0	3	0	—		—		10	0
Middlesbrough U21	2016–17	—			—		—		—		1 (Note: Appearance(s) in EFL Trophy)	0	1	0
Real Oviedo (loan)	2016–17	Segunda División	7	1	0	0	—		—		—		7	1
Nacional	2018	Uruguayan Primera División	14	1	—		—		11 (Note: Nine appearances in Copa Libertadores, two appearances in Copa Sudamericana)	0	1 (Note: Appearance in Supercopa Uruguaya)	0	26	1
Dynamo Kyiv	2018–19	Ukrainian Premier League	8	1	0	0	—		0	0	0	0	8	1
Dynamo Kyiv	2019–20	Ukrainian Premier League	28	9	3	0	—		6 (Note: Two appearances in UEFA Champions League, four appearances in UEFA Europa League)	0	1 (Note: Appearance(s) in Ukrainian Super Cup)	0	38	9
Dynamo Kyiv	2020–21	Ukrainian Premier League	19	3	2	0	—		11 (Note: Nine appearances and three goals in UEFA Champions League, two appearances in UEFA Europa League)	3	1	1	33	7
Dynamo Kyiv	2021–22	Ukrainian Premier League	16	2	0	0	—		6 (Note: Appearance(s) in UEFA Champions League)	0	1	0	23	2
Dynamo Kyiv	Total		71	15	5	0	—		23	3	3	1	102	19
Career total			156	32	6	0	3	0	49	5	5	1	219	38

== Honours ==
Nacional

- Uruguayan Primera División: 2014–15

Dynamo Kyiv

- Ukrainian Premier League: 2020–21
- Ukrainian Cup: 2019–20, 2020–21
- Ukrainian Super Cup: 2019, 2020
