= Tomasz Kędziora =

Polish footballer (born 1994)

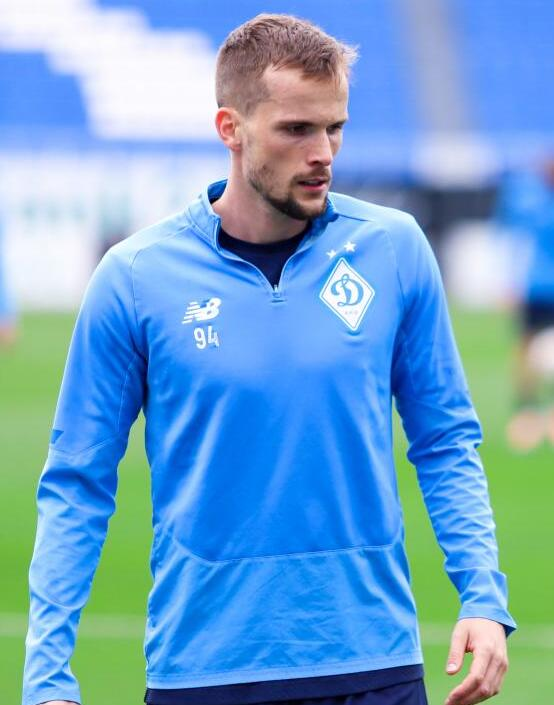
- Kędziora with Dynamo Kyiv in 2022

Personal information
- Full name: Tomasz Karol Kędziora
- Date of birth: 11 June 1994 (age 32)
- Place of birth: Sulechów, Poland
- Height: 1.84 m (6 ft 0 in)
- Positions: Centre-back; right-back

Team information
- Current team: Dynamo Kyiv
- Number: 94

Youth career
- –2010: UKP Zielona Góra
- 2010–2012: Lech Poznań

Senior career*
Years	Team	Apps	(Gls)
2012–2017	Lech Poznań	117	(5)
2017–2024	Dynamo Kyiv	125	(5)
2022	→ Lech Poznań (loan)	6	(1)
2023–2024	→ PAOK (loan)	37	(2)
2024–2026	PAOK	48	(0)
2026–	Dynamo Kyiv	9	(0)

International career^{‡}
2009–2011	Poland U17	7	(0)
2011–2012	Poland U18	5	(1)
2012–2013	Poland U19	12	(4)
2014–2015	Poland U20	4	(0)
2015–2017	Poland U21	17	(0)
2017–	Poland	39	(1)
- * Club domestic league appearances and goals as of 13:34, 10 November 2026 (UTC) ‡ National team caps and goals as of 17 November 2026

Tomasz Karol Kędziora (Polish pronunciation: [ˈtɔmaʂ ˈkarɔl kɛnˈd͡ʑɔra]; born 11 June 1994) is a Polish professional footballer who plays as a defender for Ukrainian club Dynamo Kyiv and the Poland national team.

== Club career ==
=== Early career ===
At the age of four, Tomasz Karol Kędziora started attending the youth academy of the UKP Zielona Góra. He was being trained at the time by his father, Mirosław. In July 2010, he took part as an UKP Zielona Góra player in the final tournament of the Polish Junior Championships. The team won the bronze medal, coached by Tomasz Kędziora's father.

=== Lech Poznań ===
Before the start of the 2010–11 Ekstraklarsa, Kędziora signed for reigning Polish champions Lech Poznań. Initially a player of the Junior Ekstraklasa Lech team, he played 20 matches and scored two goals in the 2010–11 season. In the 2011–12 Ekstraklarsa, he was placed in the first team, but continued to perform only in the Junior Ekstraklasa, having 20 appearances and scoring seven goals (including five from penalties).

On 20 September 2011, Kędziora was included in Lech Poznań's squad for the 1/16 Polish Cup final against Chrobry Głogów, but he did not play. On 21 June 2012, Kędziora signed a new three-year contract with the Poznań club, which went until 30 June 2015.

Kędziora made his first team debut on 12 July 2012 in a 1–1 draw of the first qualifying round of the Europa League with Kazakh football club FC Zhetysu, entering at the 90th minute for Bartosz Ślusarski.

On 27 October 2012, Kędziora made his Ekstraklasa debut in the 2–0 defeat against Jagiellonia Białystok in the 9th round, replacing Hubert Wołąkiewicz in the 62nd minute. On 20 September 2013, during the 8th round of the Ekstraklasa with Pogoń Szczecin, he suffered an injury to his thigh muscle and returned on 13 December for the 21st match against Zawisza Bydgoszcz. On 5 May 2014, he scored his first goal in the Polish top-flight in a 2–1 win in the 32nd round against Zawisza Bydgoszcz.

Kędziora signed a new three-year contract with Lech on 1 November 2015, effective until 30 June 2018. In the 2014–15 season, he won the Polish title with the team, appearing in 35 matches, scoring three goals and having six assists.

=== Dynamo Kyiv ===
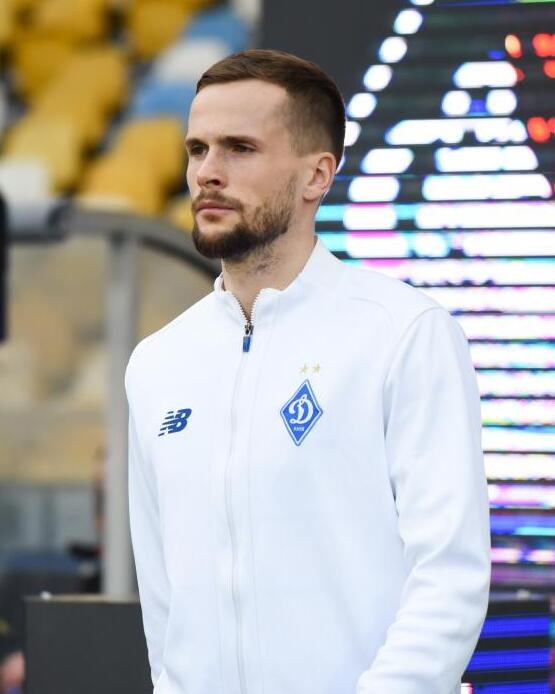
Kędziora in 2021 as a Dynamo Kyiv player

On 11 July 2017, Kędziora signed a four-year contract with Ukrainian club Dynamo Kyiv.

==== Return to Lech Poznań ====
On 7 March 2022, FIFA announced that due to the Russian invasion of Ukraine, all contracts of foreign players in Ukraine were suspended until 30 June and they were allowed to sign with clubs outside Ukraine until the latter date, with the transfer window being reopened for such players to sign and get registered for the new club until 7 April. On 17 March, Kędziora returned to Lech Poznań until the end of the season under that condition.

=== PAOK ===
On 29 January 2023, Kędziora joined Greek club PAOK on loan until the end of the season. It was extended for another twelve months on 11 July 2023.

On 10 July 2024, Kędziora terminated his contract with Dynamo by mutual consent. Three days later, he moved to PAOK on a permanent basis, signing a two-year deal with an option for a further year.

=== Return to Dynamo Kyiv ===
On 19 June 2026, Kędziora returned to Dynamo Kyiv, signing a two-year contract.

== International career ==
Kędziora got his first call-up to the senior Poland squad for friendly matches against Georgia and Greece in June 2015. He debuted against Mexico on 13 November 2017.

In May 2018, he was named in Poland’s preliminary 35-man squad for the 2018 FIFA World Cup, but did not make the final 23.

== Career statistics ==
=== Club ===
As of match played 8 November 2026

Appearances and goals by club, season and competition
Club	Season	Division	League		National cup (Note: Includes Polish Cup, Ukrainian Cup, Greek Football Cup)		Continental		Other		Total	
Club	Season	Division	Apps	Goals	Apps	Goals	Apps	Goals	Apps	Goals	Apps	Goals
Lech Poznań	2012–13	Ekstraklasa	8	0	0	0	1 (Note: Appearance(s) in UEFA Europa League)	0	—		9	0
Lech Poznań	2013–14	Ekstraklasa	14	1	0	0	2	1	—		16	2
Lech Poznań	2014–15	Ekstraklasa	35	3	5	0	4	1	—		44	4
Lech Poznań	2015–16	Ekstraklasa	24	0	4	0	9 (Note: Three appearances in UEFA Champions League, six appearances and one goal in UEFA Europa League)	1	1 (Note: Appearance in Polish Super Cup)	1	38	2
Lech Poznań	2016–17	Ekstraklasa	36	1	7	1	—		1	0	44	2
Lech Poznań	Total		117	5	16	1	16	3	2	1	151	10
Dynamo Kyiv	2017–18	Ukrainian Premier League	22	1	4	0	10	0	—		36	1
Dynamo Kyiv	2018–19	Ukrainian Premier League	27	2	1	0	14 (Note: Four appearances and one goal in UEFA Champions League, ten appearances and one goal in UEFA Europa League)	2	1 (Note: Appearance in Ukrainian Super Cup)	0	43	4
Dynamo Kyiv	2019–20	Ukrainian Premier League	27	0	3	0	8 (Note: Two appearances in UEFA Champions League, six appearances in UEFA Europa League)	0	1	0	39	0
Dynamo Kyiv	2020–21	Ukrainian Premier League	25	1	1	0	13 (Note: Nine appearances in UEFA Champions League, four appearances in UEFA Europa League)	0	1	0	40	1
Dynamo Kyiv	2021–22	Ukrainian Premier League	15	1	1	0	5 (Note: Five appearances in UEFA Champions League)	0	1	0	22	1
Dynamo Kyiv	2022–23	Ukrainian Premier League	9	0	0	0	9 (Note: Six appearances in UEFA Champions League, three appearances in UEFA Europa League)	0	0	0	18	0
Dynamo Kyiv	Total		125	5	10	0	59	2	4	0	198	7
Lech Poznań (loan)	2021–22	Ekstraklasa	6	1	1	0	—		—		7	1
PAOK (loan)	2022–23	Super League Greece	8	1	2	0	—		—		10	1
PAOK (loan)	2023–24	Super League Greece	29	1	4	1	14 (Note: Appearances in UEFA Conference League)	1	—		47	3
PAOK	2024–25	Super League Greece	25	0	3	0	14 (Note: Two appearances in UEFA Champions League, ten appearances in UEFA Europa League)	0	—		42	0
PAOK	2025–26	Super League Greece	23	0	7	0	12	0	—		42	0
PAOK	Total		85	2	16	1	40	1	—		141	4
Dynamo Kyiv	2026–27	Ukrainian Premier League	9	0	1	0	5 (Note: Four appearances in UEFA Europa League, one appearance in UEFA Conference League)	0	—		15	0
Career total			342	13	44	2	120	6	6	1	512	22

=== International ===
As of match played 17 November 2026

Appearances and goals by national team and year
National team	Year	Apps	Goals
Poland	2017	1	0
Poland	2018	6	0
Poland	2019	9	0
Poland	2020	5	0
Poland	2021	5	1
Poland	2022	0	0
Poland	2023	6	0
Poland	2024	0	0
Poland	2025	4	0
Poland	2026	3	0
Total		39	1

Scores and results list Poland's goal tally first, score column indicates score after each Kędziora goal.

List of international goals scored by Tomasz Kędziora
No.	Date	Venue	Opponent	Score	Result	Competition
1	9 October 2021	Stadion Narodowy, Warsaw, Poland	San Marino	3–0	5–0	2022 FIFA World Cup qualification

== Honours ==
Lech Poznań

- Ekstraklasa: 2014–15, 2021–22
- Polish Super Cup: 2015, 2016

Dynamo Kyiv

- Ukrainian Premier League: 2020–21
- Ukrainian Cup: 2019–20, 2020–21
- Ukrainian Super Cup: 2018, 2019, 2020

PAOK

- Super League Greece: 2023–24
