= Roberto De Zerbi =

Italian football manager (born 1979)

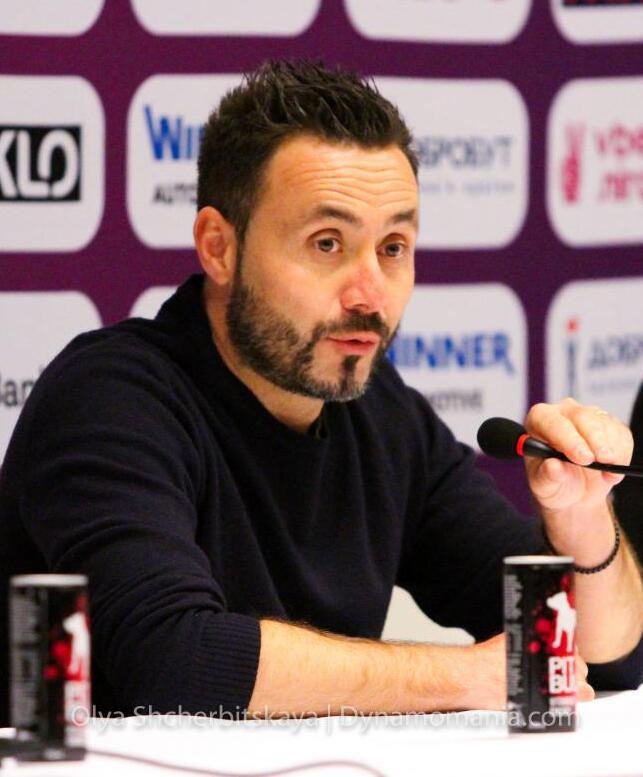
- De Zerbi in 2021

Personal information
- Full name: Roberto De Zerbi
- Date of birth: 6 June 1979 (age 47)
- Place of birth: Brescia, Italy
- Height: 1.75 m (5 ft 9 in)
- Position: Attacking midfielder

Team information
- Current team: Tottenham Hotspur (head coach)

Youth career
- 1991–1995: Mompiano
- 1995–1998: AC Milan

Senior career*
Years	Team	Apps	(Gls)
1998–2001	AC Milan	0	(0)
1998	→ Monza (loan)	9	(0)
1999	→ Padova (loan)	11	(2)
1999	→ Como (loan)	6	(0)
2000	→ Padova (loan)	12	(3)
2000–2001	→ Avellino (loan)	6	(0)
2001	→ Lecco (loan)	7	(0)
2002–2004	Foggia	56	(18)
2004–2005	Arezzo	27	(4)
2005–2006	Catania	34	(7)
2006–2010	Napoli	33	(3)
2008	→ Brescia (loan)	17	(1)
2008–2009	→ Avellino (loan)	15	(5)
2010	→ CFR Cluj (loan)	4	(0)
2010–2012	CFR Cluj	18	(8)
2013	Trento	10	(3)
Total		265	(54)

Managerial career
- 2013–2014: Darfo Boario
- 2014–2016: Foggia
- 2016: Palermo
- 2017–2018: Benevento
- 2018–2021: Sassuolo
- 2021–2022: Shakhtar Donetsk
- 2022–2024: Brighton & Hove Albion
- 2024–2026: Marseille
- 2026–: Tottenham Hotspur
- * Club domestic league appearances and goals

Roberto De Zerbi (Italian: [roˈbɛrto de dˈdzɛrbi]; born 6 June 1979) is an Italian professional football head coach and former player who is the head coach of Premier League club Tottenham Hotspur.

== Playing career ==
De Zerbi started his professional career at AC Milan. He spent four seasons on loan to lower divisions clubs (Serie B to Serie C2). He spent 1999–2000 Serie C1 season in Como along with Alberto Comazzi and Luca Saudati of Milan. Half of the registration rights were also sold to Salernitana in the 2000–01 and 2001–02 season. In June 2002, Milan bought back De Zerbi from Salernitana, and subsequently sold him to Foggia.

De Zerbi signed for Serie B side Napoli from Catania for €2.5 million in 2006.

On 8 February 2010, Napoli announced his loan transfer to Romanian Liga I club CFR Cluj, with the deal being made permanent on 31 August 2010 on a three-year contract.

== Coaching career ==
=== Palermo ===
On 6 September 2016, De Zerbi was named head coach of Serie A club Palermo following Davide Ballardini's departure by mutual consent due to disagreements with the board. His stint at the helm of the Sicilians, however, turned out to be negative, with seven consecutive defeats and no points at home in three months. After a penalty shootout elimination in a home match against Serie B club Spezia, De Zerbi was sacked on 30 November 2016, and replaced with former team captain Eugenio Corini.

=== Benevento ===
On 23 October 2017, De Zerbi was named head coach of 2017–18 Serie A newcomers Benevento. Despite the side being relegated to Serie B at the end of the season, De Zerbi was praised for his possession-based, attacking football and transfer business.

=== Sassuolo ===
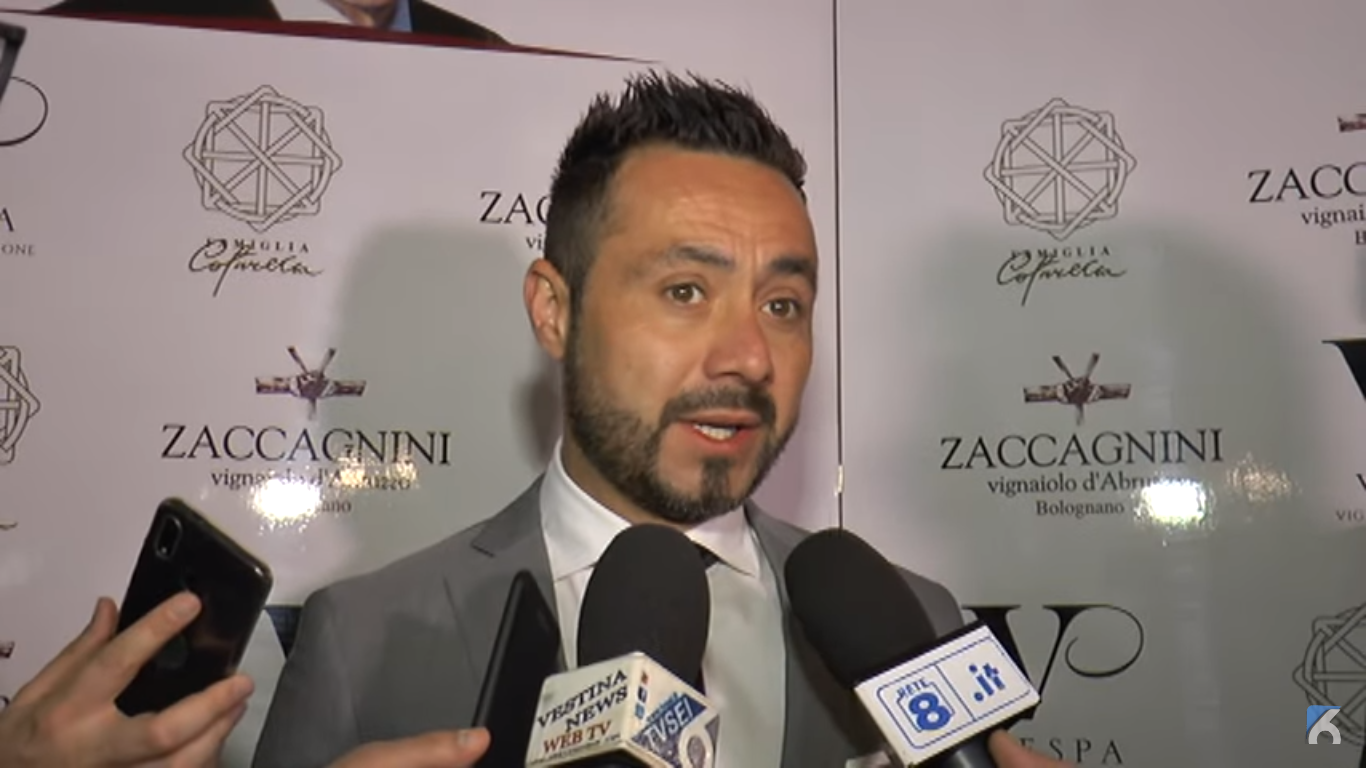
De Zerbi during an interview in 2019

On 13 June 2018, De Zerbi was appointed manager of Sassuolo. Under his tenure, Sassuolo were praised for their footballing style coupled with overachieving results, which led the small Emilia based club to two consecutive eighth place spots in the Italian top flight, losing a UEFA Conference League qualification place to Roma only on goal difference at the end of the 2020–21 Serie A season.

In May 2021, De Zerbi announced he would leave Sassuolo at the end of the season.

=== Shakhtar Donetsk ===
On 25 May 2021, De Zerbi was announced as the new head coach of Ukrainian Premier League club Shakhtar Donetsk. On 22 September, he won the 2021 Ukrainian Super Cup against Dynamo Kyiv at the Olympic Stadium in Kyiv, becoming the first Italian manager to win the title. He departed the club in July 2022 as a result of the Russian invasion of Ukraine. He managed to leave the club at the top of the UPL during the unfinished season.

=== Brighton & Hove Albion ===
==== 2022–23 season ====
De Zerbi succeeded Graham Potter as head coach of Premier League side Brighton & Hove Albion on 18 September 2022, signing a four-year contract. He managed his first game in England on 1 October, in a 3–3 away draw at Liverpool with Leandro Trossard becoming the first Brighton player to score a Premier League hat-trick.

De Zerbi lost his first game at Brighton's Falmer Stadium on 9 October, calling his players "fantastic" despite the 1–0 defeat to Tottenham Hotspur. His first win came on 29 October with a 4–1 thrashing of Graham Potter's Chelsea. De Zerbi went three games unbeaten against Liverpool in his debut campaign at Brighton, including beating them as defending champions in the FA Cup fourth round on 29 January 2023.

On 18 February, he was sent off by referee Darren England following Brighton's 1–0 home defeat against Fulham. De Zerbi was shown a red card for complaining that he had lost time to prepare for the match due to a refereeing meeting during the week. In a post-match interview, he said the "level of refereeing in the Premier League is very bad", whilst also criticising Darren England for not having a "good attitude". On March 3, he was banned from the touchline for one game and fined £15,000 by the FA in the wake of his red card in the Fulham game.

On 8 April 2023, after an altercation with Tottenham Hotspur interim manager Cristian Stellini and other members of Tottenham's coaching staff during Brighton's 2–1 away defeat at the Tottenham Hotspur Stadium, De Zerbi and Stellini were sent off. Following the match, De Zerbi stated: "I am used to always respecting everyone and I want the same to me". This followed alleged comments Stellini made towards him in an article published by Italian newspaper La Gazzetta dello Sport. The match was also marred by controversy after Howard Webb, chief refereeing officer of the PGMOL, later admitted Brighton should have been awarded a penalty for a foul on Kaoru Mitoma, the third such instance in the 2022–23 season in which Brighton had received an apology from the PGMOL for incorrect refereeing decisions.

De Zerbi guided Brighton to the semi-final of the FA Cup, where they faced Manchester United at Wembley on 23 April. Brighton went on to lose on penalties after a goalless 120 minutes. The Italian responded to the defeat by saying that Brighton "have to close the page" by putting disappointment behind them and fighting for a place in Europe. Three days later, Brighton went on to lose 3–1 at Nottingham Forest before their biggest Premier League victory at the weekend on 29 April, a 6–0 home win over Wolves to boost Brighton's European hopes. Brighton took revenge on Manchester United on 4 May, with Alexis Mac Allister scoring the only goal of the match, a 99th minute penalty that put Brighton on course for Europe. However, four days later, Brighton suffered one of their worst Premier League defeats and the worst under De Zerbi, losing to Everton 5–1 at Falmer Stadium. The Toffees opened the scoreline in 34 seconds.

On 21 May, Brighton beat Southampton 3–1 at home, securing a top seven finish, meaning that Brighton had qualified for Europe for the first time in the club's history. De Zerbi called the qualification "more prestigious than winning the title" with a top six club. The Italian spoke with pride of coaching Brighton, calling it "an honour". Three days later, Brighton sealed their place in the 2023–24 UEFA Europa League after a 1–1 draw at home against champions Manchester City.

==== 2023–24 season ====
De Zerbi's Brighton hosted Luton Town in the opening game of the Premier League season on 12 August, winning 4–1 with several players making their Brighton debuts including goalscorers João Pedro and Simon Adingra.

On Brighton's European debut on 21 September, they fell to a 3–2 home defeat to Greek champions AEK Athens. At the Stade Vélodrome in Marseille on 5 October, in their first ever away game in Europe, Brighton came from two down to draw 2–2 with goals by Pascal Groß and João Pedro. On 26 October, Brighton won for the first time in Europe, after defeating European veterans Ajax 2–0 at home.

Following a 1–1 home draw against Sheffield United on 13 November, a match in which De Zerbi received a yellow card for his conduct on the touchline, he was critical of the performance of referees in England, stating: "I am honest and clear. I don’t like 80 per cent of England’s referees. It’s not a new thing. I don’t like them. I don’t like their behaviour on the pitch."

Brighton's league form under De Zerbi, after a strong start consisting of five wins in their first six games, became inconsistent as 2023 drew to a close, throughout which the squad endured several injuries to key players. By December 2023, ten Brighton players were unavailable due to injury, including forwards Kaoru Mitoma, Simon Adingra, Solly March, Ansu Fati and Julio Enciso, as well as defenders Pervis Estupiñán, Tariq Lamptey, Adam Webster and Joel Veltman. Throughout the latter stages of 2023, Brighton's mixed results included a 6–1 away defeat to Aston Villa on 30 September contrasted with a 4–2 home victory over Tottenham Hotspur on 28 December, between which Brighton drew six and won two out of eleven games.

De Zerbi expressed frustration towards Brighton's January 2024 transfer window activity, with the club's only first-team signing being of 19-year old Argentine defender Valentín Barco. De Zerbi, when asked in a press conference about Brighton’s midfield resources, stated: “I spoke with the club, but they decided a different way". The club had signed young midfielder Carlos Baleba, in addition to James Milner and Mahmoud Dahoud as replacements for the outgoing Moisés Caicedo and Alexis Mac Allister in the summer 2023 window, however Dahoud departed the club on loan in the January window.

Under De Zerbi's stewardship, the club advanced to the knockout phase of the Europa League and also won their group, after a 1–0 victory over Marseille in their final match of the group phase.

On 28 February 2024, Brighton's FA Cup campaign came to an end in the fifth round after a 1–0 defeat to Wolverhampton Wanderers at Molineux Stadium. Brighton's Europa League campaign came to a halt in the round of 16 phase, after a 4–1 aggregate loss over two legs to Roma, with Brighton losing 4–0 away in the first leg.

During March 2024, wherein De Zerbi became linked with managerial posts at several clubs including Barcelona, Manchester United, Liverpool and Bayern Munich, comments made by De Zerbi surrounding his future at Brighton invited speculation on whether he would leave the club. On whether an agreement had been reached with Brighton to renew his contract, De Zerbi stated: "At the moment, no. We didn't find the agreement. The contract is a part of the future. It's important for me, it's important for everyone but it's a small part, the big part is the plan. We have to speak with the club. The future I want to keep my ambition, my motivation, I live for football 24 hours a day. I want to know what is the plan, what is the project, what is the future because if I don't feel comfortable, I don't feel the right motivation, I can't stay any longer." Despite these comments, De Zerbi later stated in May 2024: "I think I would like to stay in Brighton because I love my players. I love this city. I love my club, my fans. I said in the meeting with the fans, if I'm happy, there isn't any club can bring myself to change a team but I want to keep my passion always." This followed a 1–0 home victory over Aston Villa, which left Brighton eleventh in the Premier League table, with the club having fallen out of contention for European qualification, following a series of prior defeats in 2024.

On 18 May 2024, Brighton & Hove Albion announced that they had reached a mutual agreement with De Zerbi to terminate his contract following the conclusion of the 2023–24 season. On his departure from Brighton, De Zerbi stated: "I am very sad to be leaving Brighton, but I am very proud of what my players and staff have achieved with the support of everyone at the club and our amazing fans in the past two historical seasons." De Zerbi's public discontent surrounding Brighton's recruitment strategy was cited as having contributed towards the "irreconcilable differences", which had formed between him and the club's hierarchy.

=== Marseille ===
Ligue 1 side Marseille appointed De Zerbi as manager on 29 June 2024 on a three-year contract. De Zerbi began his season with a 5–1 win over Brest. He led the club to a second-place finish in his debut season with the club in 2024–25.

After being eliminated from the Champions League league phase with a 3–0 away defeat to Club Brugge, and following a 5–0 loss away to rivals Paris Saint-Germain on 8 February 2026, De Zerbi and Marseille mutually agreed to part ways with immediate effect three days later.

During his tenure at Marseille, De Zerbi supported Marseille player Mason Greenwood who was let go from Manchester United after he was charged with attempted rape and assault. De Zerbi said Greenwood had "paid in a strong way."

=== Tottenham Hotspur ===
On 31 March 2026, De Zerbi was appointed by Tottenham Hotspur to succeed Igor Tudor as head coach, signing a five-year contract. He managed to steer the club clear of relegation on the final matchday of the 2025–26 season following a 1–0 win over Everton. He described saving Spurs as the "biggest achievement" of his career, and was praised by players including James Maddison and Conor Gallagher, with the latter saying "thank God the new gaffer came in because he was the reason it turned around."

After a series of poor results at the beginning of the 2026-27 season, De Zerbi's Spurs were bottom of the table after their first 5 games, their worst start to a season ever. However, Spurs then went on to win three successive games, including a 2-0 victory over rivals Chelsea at Stamford Bridge, their first win there since 2018. Tottenham found themselves back in the top half by November.

== Tactics and style of management ==
De Zerbi has developed a reputation for playing an attacking–minded possession-based style of football, focusing heavily on shorter build-up from the goalkeeper rather than quick counter-attacks. He also favours a deep double pivot approach in a 4–2–3–1 system whilst deploying an aggressive high press off the ball. This aims to draw the opposition higher up the pitch centrally, which De Zerbi's teams aim to exploit by working the ball wide, with his full backs veering close to the touchline on both sides. Through the goalkeeper acting as an auxiliary centre back in this set up, full backs are provided with the opportunity to push further forward, with a centre-forward or number 10 interchanging positions using the space created by the deep double pivot inviting pressure from the opposition. In these situations, De Zerbi's teams exhibit flexibility in methods of receiving the ball, through direct, clipped passes over the opposition press from the goalkeeper or centre-backs, where an emphasis on an ability and confidence to receive the ball under pressure close to their own goal is placed.

During a low-build up, De Zerbi's teams use seven players starting with the goalkeeper in a 1–4–2 shape. The wingers remain high and wide in this scenario, with two midfielders acting as number 10s in positioning themselves between the opposition's backline and midfield line. Should the opposition's centre-backs push up in response, De Zerbi's wingers use the resulting space created to facilitate one-on-one situations against the opposition full-backs. If the opposition centre-backs remain deep, his teams aim to take advantage of a numerical superiority in midfield. In a high-build up, De Zerbi's team's utilise a 1–2–3–5 or 1–3–1–5–1 shape, with a single high and wide player to prioritise playing through the middle and shorten the length of the opposition's passes, whilst the wide player aims to pull the opposition back line out of position.

The style of play produced by De Zerbi's teams has been praised by some of his peers, including Spanish head coach Pep Guardiola citing him as "one of the most influential managers in the last 20 years".

== Managerial statistics ==
As of match played 21 November 2026

Managerial record by team and tenure
Team	Nat.	From	To	Record					Ref.
Team	Nat.	From	To	G	W	D	L	Win %	Ref.
Darfo Boario	(Italy)	19 November 2013	30 June 2014	22	5	5	12	22.73	
Foggia	(Italy)	1 July 2014	14 August 2016	91	47	25	19	51.65	
Palermo	(Italy)	6 September 2016	30 November 2016	13	1	3	9	7.69	
Benevento	(Italy)	23 October 2017	30 June 2018	29	6	3	20	20.69	
Sassuolo	(Italy)	1 July 2018	24 May 2021	120	43	36	41	35.83	
Shakhtar Donetsk	(Ukraine)	25 May 2021	11 July 2022	30	20	5	5	66.67	
Brighton & Hove Albion	(England)	18 September 2022	30 June 2024	89	38	22	29	42.70	
Marseille	(France)	1 July 2024	11 February 2026	69	39	10	20	56.52	
Tottenham Hotspur	(England)	31 March 2026	Present	20	8	5	7	40.00	
Career Total				481	206	114	161	42.83	

== Honours ==
=== Player ===
Foggia

- Serie C2: 2002–03

CFR Cluj

- Liga I: 2009–10, 2011–12
- Cupa Romaniei: 2009–10

=== Manager ===
Foggia

- Coppa Italia Lega Pro: 2015–16

Shakhtar Donetsk

- Ukrainian Super Cup: 2021

Individual

- Enzo Bearzot Award: 2022
- Premier League Manager of the Month: October 2026

== See also ==
- List of foreign Liga I players
