= Serhiy Sydorchuk =

Ukrainian footballer

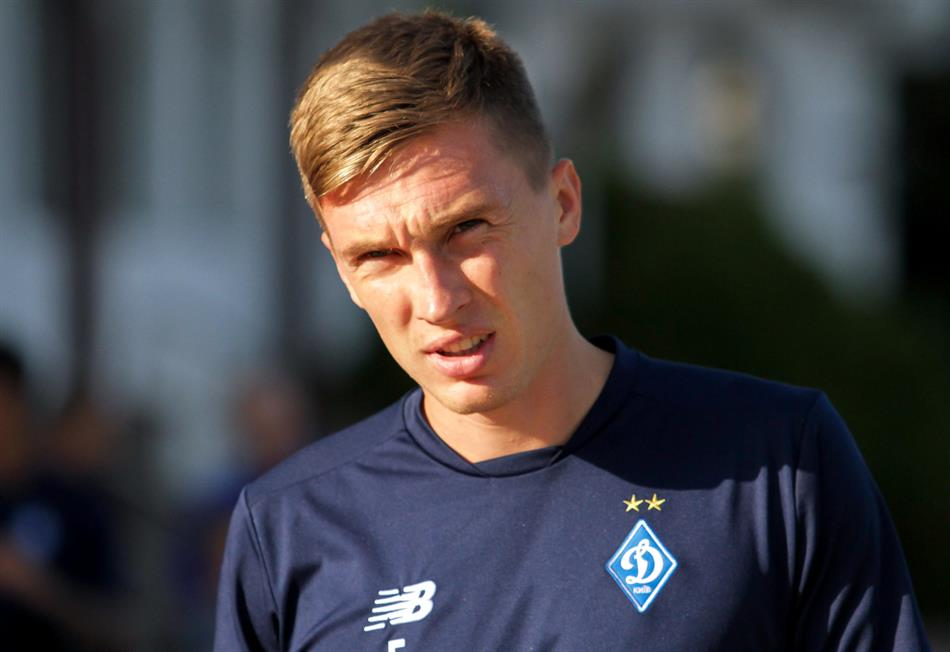
- Sydorchuk with Dynamo Kyiv in 2018

Personal information
- Full name: Serhiy Oleksandrovych Sydorchuk
- Date of birth: 2 May 1991 (age 35)
- Place of birth: Dzhankoi, Crimean ASSR, Ukrainian SSR
- Height: 1.89 m (6 ft 2 in)
- Position: Midfielder

Team information
- Current team: Westerlo
- Number: 8

Youth career
- 2004–2008: Metalurh Zaporizhzhia

Senior career*
Years	Team	Apps	(Gls)
2008–2011	Metalurh-2 Zaporizhzhia	17	(0)
2008–2013	Metalurh Zaporizhzhia	63	(4)
2013–2023	Dynamo Kyiv	213	(18)
2023–	Westerlo	61	(3)

International career^{‡}
2008–2009	Ukraine U18	7	(1)
2009–2010	Ukraine U19	11	(1)
2013–2024	Ukraine	62	(3)
- * Club domestic league appearances and goals as of 1 June 2026 ‡ National team caps and goals as of 21 June 2024

Serhiy Oleksandrovych Sydorchuk (Ukrainian: Сергі́й Олекса́ндрович Сидорчу́к; born 2 May 1991) is a Ukrainian professional footballer who plays as a midfielder for Belgian Pro League club Westerlo and the Ukraine national team.

== Club career ==
=== Metalurh Zaporizhzhia ===
Serhiy was born in Dzhankoi, Crimean ASSR, Ukrainian SSR but moved at the age of one with his parents to Zaporizhzhia. Sydorchuk is a product of Metalurh Zaporizhzhia academy. He made his debut for Metalurh Zaporizhzhia entering as a second-half substitute against Metalurh Donetsk on 23 August 2009 in the Ukrainian Premier League.

=== Dynamo Kyiv ===
On 21 December 2012, Sydorchuk signed a five-year contract with Dynamo. On 11 August 2013, he scored his first goal for the club in a league match against FC Chornomorets Odesa. On 29 September 2015, Sydorchuk made his UEFA Champions League debut in the second match of the group stage against Israeli club Maccabi Tel Aviv away from home, which Dynamo won 2–0.

=== Westerlo ===
On 5 September 2023, Belgian Pro League club Westerlo announced the signing of Sydorchuk on a three-year contract.

== International career ==
Sydorchuk made his full international debut for Ukraine on 9 October 2014, replacing captain Ruslan Rotan in the 64th minute of a European qualifier away to Belarus in Barysaw. In added time, he scored the second goal of a 2–0 win, a close-range finish set up by Andriy Yarmolenko. Three days later in the next qualifier at the Arena Lviv, he scored the only goal to defeat Macedonia.

== Career statistics ==
=== Club ===
As of match played 18 May 2024

Appearances and goals by club, season and competition
Club	Season	League			Cup		Continental		Other		Total	
Club	Season	Division	Apps	Goals	Apps	Goals	Apps	Goals	Apps	Goals	Apps	Goals
Metalurh-2 Zaporizhzhia	2008–09	Ukrainian Second League	14	0	0	0	—		—		14	0
Metalurh-2 Zaporizhzhia	2011–12	Ukrainian Second League	3	0	0	0	—		—		3	0
Metalurh-2 Zaporizhzhia	Total		17	0	0	0	—		—		17	0
Metalurh Zaporizhzhia	2009–10	Ukrainian Premier League	7	0	1	0	—		—		8	0
Metalurh Zaporizhzhia	2010–11	Ukrainian Premier League	19	0	2	1	—		—		21	1
Metalurh Zaporizhzhia	2011–12	Ukrainian First League	27	4	3	0	—		—		30	4
Metalurh Zaporizhzhia	2012–13	Ukrainian Premier League	10	0	1	0	—		—		11	0
Metalurh Zaporizhzhia	Total		63	4	7	1	—		—		70	5
Dynamo Kyiv	2012–13	Ukrainian Premier League	7	0	0	0	0	0	–		7	0
Dynamo Kyiv	2013–14	Ukrainian Premier League	14	2	4	0	4 (Note: Appearance(s) in UEFA Europa League)	0	–		22	2
Dynamo Kyiv	2014–15	Ukrainian Premier League	22	3	6	0	11	0	0	0	39	3
Dynamo Kyiv	2015–16	Ukrainian Premier League	19	1	3	0	6 (Note: Appearance(s) in UEFA Champions League)	0	1 (Note: Ukrainian Super Cup)	0	29	1
Dynamo Kyiv	2016–17	Ukrainian Premier League	27	4	4	0	5	1	1	0	37	5
Dynamo Kyiv	2017–18	Ukrainian Premier League	10	0	0	0	7 (Note: Two appearances in UEFA Champions League, five appearances and one goal in UEFA Europa League)	1	1	0	18	1
Dynamo Kyiv	2018–19	Ukrainian Premier League	23	1	0	0	12 (Note: Four appearances in UEFA Champions League, eight appearances in UEFA Europa League)	0	1	0	36	1
Dynamo Kyiv	2019–20	Ukrainian Premier League	25	1	3	1	6 (Note: One appearance in UEFA Champions League, five appearances in UEFA Europa League)	0	1	0	35	2
Dynamo Kyiv	2020–21	Ukrainian Premier League	21	3	3	0	11 (Note: Seven appearances in UEFA Champions League, four appearances in UEFA Europa League)	0	1	0	36	3
Dynamo Kyiv	2021–22	Ukrainian Premier League	15	2	1	0	6	0	1	0	23	2
Dynamo Kyiv	2022–23	Ukrainian Premier League	27	0	0	0	11 (Note: Five appearances in UEFA Champions League, six appearances in UEFA Europa League)	0	—		38	0
Dynamo Kyiv	2023–24	Ukrainian Premier League	3	1	0	0	4 (Note: Appearance(s) in UEFA Europa Conference League)	0	—		7	1
Dynamo Kyiv	Total		213	18	24	1	83	2	7	0	327	21
Westerlo	2023–24	Belgian Pro League	29	1	0	0	—		—		29	1
Career total			322	23	31	2	83	2	7	0	443	27

=== International ===
As of match played 21 June 2024

Appearances and goals by national team and year
National team	Year	Apps	Goals
Ukraine	2014	4	2
Ukraine	2015	5	0
Ukraine	2016	8	0
Ukraine	2017	4	0
Ukraine	2018	4	0
Ukraine	2019	3	0
Ukraine	2020	4	0
Ukraine	2021	15	1
Ukraine	2022	7	0
Ukraine	2023	6	0
Ukraine	2024	1	0
Total		61	3

As of match played 19 June 2023
Scores and results list Ukraine's goal tally first, score column indicates score after each Sydorchuk goal.

List of international goals scored by Serhiy Sydorchuk
No.	Date	Venue	Opponent	Score	Result	Competition
1	9 October 2014	Borisov Arena, Barysaw, Belarus	Belarus	2–0	2–0	UEFA Euro 2016 qualifying
2	12 October 2014	Arena Lviv, Lviv, Ukraine	Macedonia	1–0	1–0	UEFA Euro 2016 qualifying
3	24 March 2021	Stade de France, Saint-Denis, France	France	1–1	1–1	2022 FIFA World Cup qualification

== Honours ==
Dynamo Kyiv

- Ukrainian Premier League: 2014–15, 2015–16, 2020–21
- Ukrainian Cup: 2013–14, 2014–15, 2019–20, 2020–21
- Ukrainian Super Cup: 2016, 2018, 2019, 2020

Metalurh Zaporizhzhia

- Ukrainian First League runner-up: 2011–12
