= 2018 Ukrainian Super Cup =

2018 Super Cup
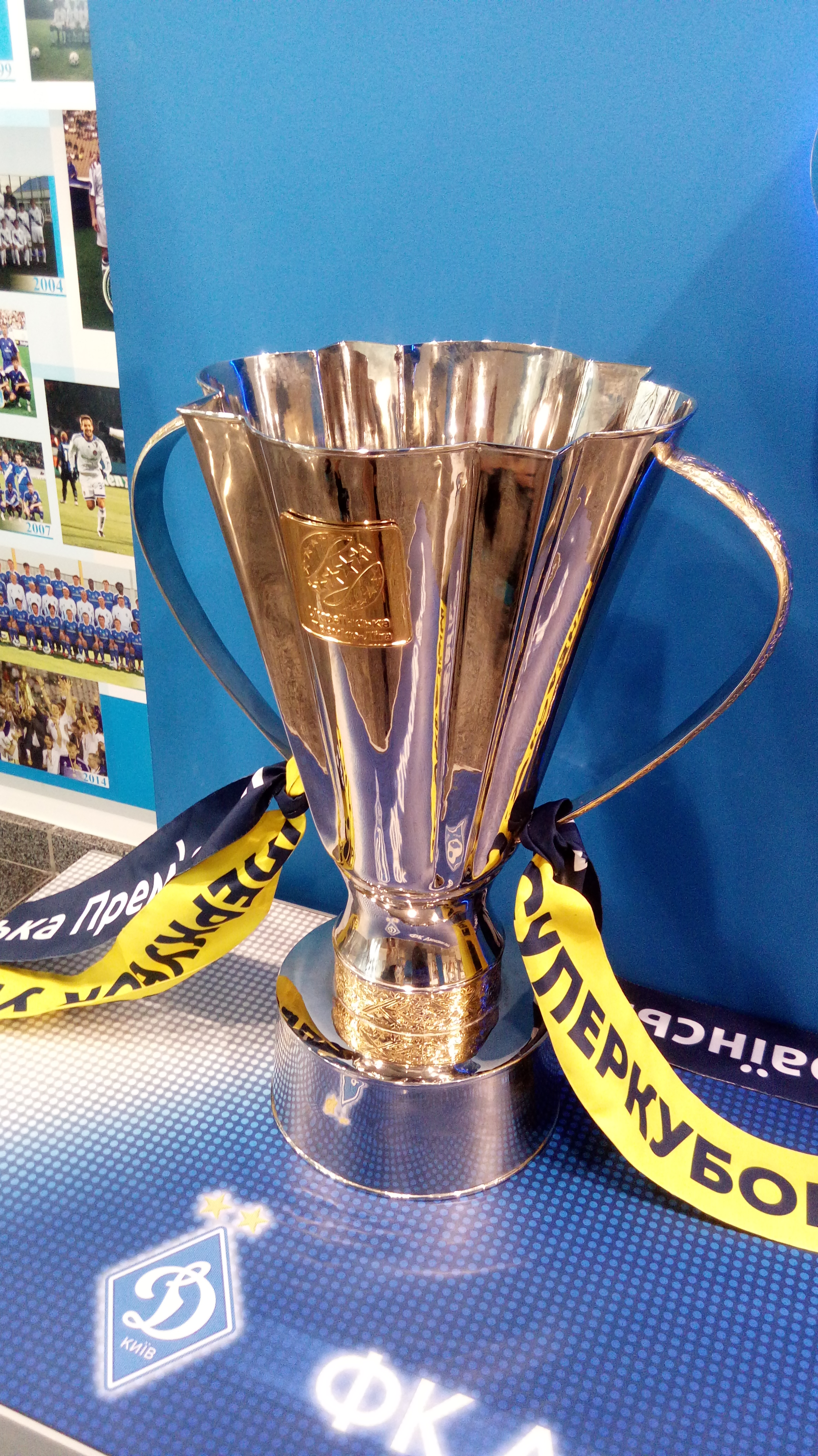
- The Cup in Dynamo Museum
Shakhtar Donetsk	Dynamo Kyiv
0	1
- Date: 21 July 2018
- Venue: Chornomorets Stadium, Odesa
- Referee: Kostyantyn Trukhanov
- Attendance: 27,400
- Weather: Humid heat

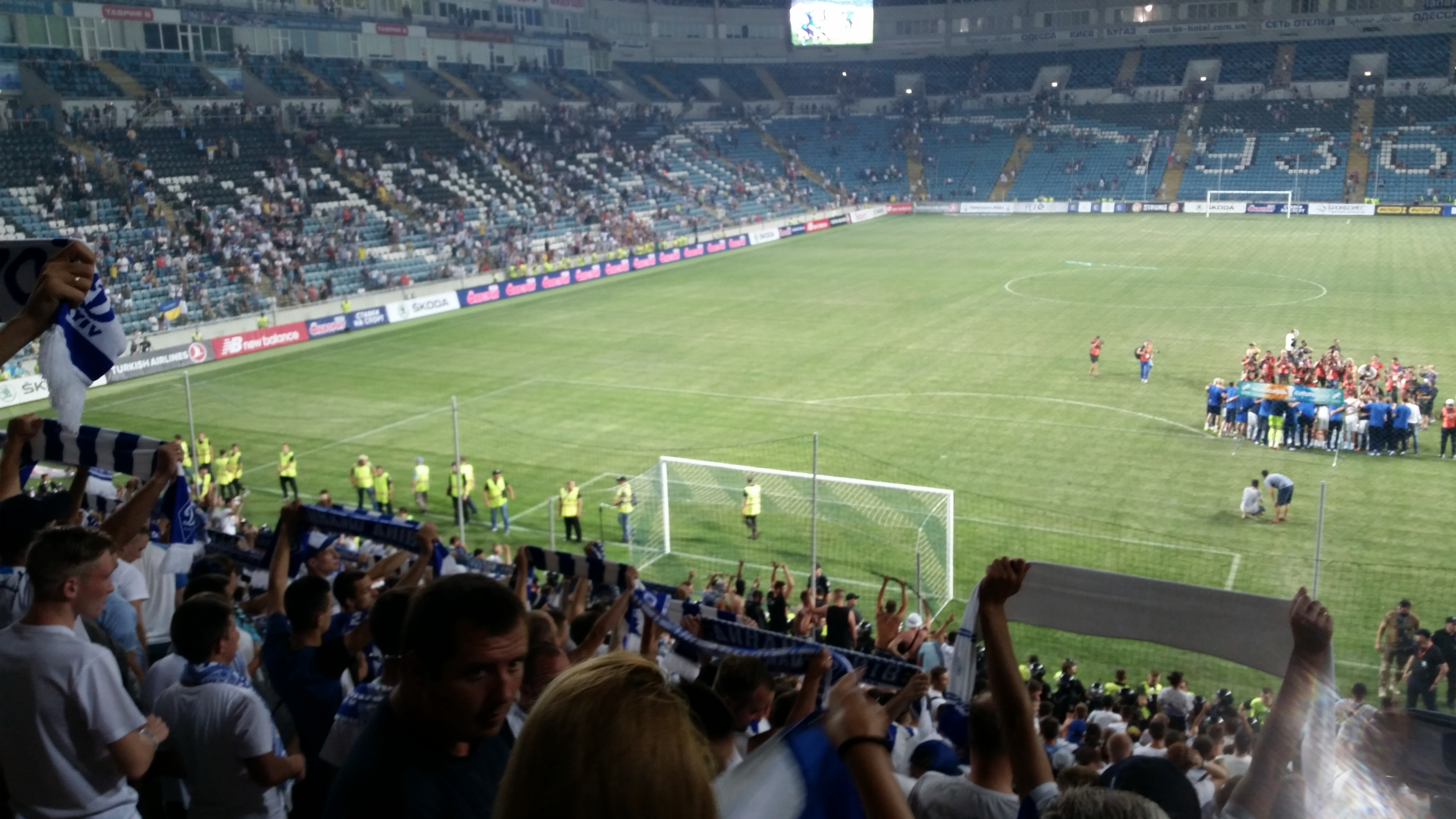
Ukrainian Super Cup 2018 - Dynamo stands

The 2018 Ukrainian Super Cup became the 15th edition of Ukrainian Super Cup, an annual season opener football match contested by the winners of the previous season's Ukrainian Top League and Ukrainian Cup competitions.

The match was played at the Chornomorets Stadium, Odesa, on 21 July 2018, and contested by league and cup winner Shakhtar Donetsk and league and cup runner-up Dynamo Kyiv.

== Previous encounters ==
Before this game, both teams met in the Ukrainian Super Cup ten (10) times, the first being back in 2004. Out of the previous ten before this game, Shakhtar won 3 games and Dynamo won 2. Five more games were tied and led to penalty shootout, three of which were won by Dynamo and two were won by Shakhtar.

== Match ==
=== Details ===
21 July 2018
21:00 EEST

Shakhtar Donetsk	0 – 1	Dynamo Kyiv
Ismaily (red card) 90+7'	Report	18' Buyalskyi; (yellow card) 13' (yellow-red card) 90+7' Burda

Chornomorets Stadium, Odesa
Attendance: 27,400
Referee: Kostyantyn Trukhanov

Shakhtar Donetsk	Dynamo Kyiv

Shakhtar Donetsk
GK	30	(Ukraine) Andriy Pyatov
DF	94	(Ukraine) Oleh Danchenko	(yellow card) 53'
DF	44	(Ukraine) Yaroslav Rakitskiy
DF	4	(Ukraine) Serhiy Kryvtsov
DF	31	(Brazil) Ismaily	(red card) 90+5'
MF	6	(Ukraine) Taras Stepanenko (c)
MF	21	(Brazil) Alan Patrick
MF	99	(Brazil) Fernando	(yellow card) 60'	(substituted off) 70'
MF	74	(Ukraine) Viktor Kovalenko		(substituted off) 67'
MF	11	(Ukraine) Marlos
FW	10	(Brazil) Júnior Moraes	(yellow card) 90+3'
Substitutes
GK	1	(Ukraine) Oleksiy Shevchenko
DF	2	(Ukraine) Bohdan Butko
DF	22	(Ukraine) Mykola Matviyenko
MF	27	(Brazil) Maycon
MF	59	(Ukraine) Oleksandr Zubkov
MF	50	(Ukraine) Serhiy Bolbat		(substituted on) 70'
MF	29	(Ukraine) Andriy Totovytskyi	(yellow card) 90+5'	(substituted on) 67'
Head coach
(Portugal) Paulo Fonseca

Dynamo Kyiv
GK	71	(Ukraine) Denys Boyko	(yellow card) 90+7'
DF	9	(Ukraine) Mykola Morozyuk
DF	26	(Ukraine) Mykyta Burda	(yellow card) 26' (yellow-red card) 90+5'
DF	44	(Hungary) Tamás Kádár	(yellow card) 81'
DF	94	(Poland) Tomasz Kędziora	(yellow card) 90+5'
MF	8	(Ukraine) Volodymyr Shepelyev	(yellow card) 71'
MF	6	(Brazil) Tchê Tchê		(substituted off) 46'
MF	29	(Ukraine) Vitaliy Buyalskyi	18'	(substituted off) 77'
MF	7	(Slovenia) Benjamin Verbič
MF	15	(Ukraine) Viktor Tsyhankov (c)
FW	41	(Ukraine) Artem Besyedin
Substitutes
GK	1	(Ukraine) Heorhiy Bushchan
DF	30	(Ukraine) Artem Shabanov
MF	19	(Ukraine) Denys Harmash	(substituted on) 46'	(substituted off) 71'
MF	18	(Ukraine) Oleksandr Andriyevskyi
MF	5	(Ukraine) Serhiy Sydorchuk		(substituted on) 68'
MF	10	(Ukraine) Mykola Shaparenko		(substituted on) 71'
FW	43	(Ukraine) Nazar Rusyn
Head coach
(Belarus) Alyaksandr Khatskevich

Assistant referees:

Serhiy Bekker
Oleh Pluzhnyk

Fourth referee:

Yuri Mozharovskiy

Match rules

- 90 minutes of regulation.
- No extra time of regulation if score is level.
- Penalty shoot-out if scores still level.
- Seven named substitutes, of which up to three may be used.
- No more than 9 foreign players on a field at one time for each team.

=== Statistics ===
First half
Statistic	Dynamo Kyiv	Shakhtar Donetsk
Goals scored	0	0
Total shots	5	7
Shots on target	2	2
Corner kicks	1	3
Fouls committed	11	4
Offsides	0	0
Yellow cards	1	0
Red cards	0	0

Overall
Statistic	Dynamo Kyiv	Shakhtar Donetsk
Goals scored	1	0
Total shots	10	10
Shots on target	3	4
Corner kicks	1	10
Fouls committed	28	20
Offsides	0	0
Yellow cards	6	4
Red cards	1	1
