= 2004 Ukrainian Super Cup =

Dynamo Kyiv	Shakhtar Donetsk
1	1
- Dynamo Kyiv won 6–5 on penalties
- Date: 10 July 2004
- Venue: Central Stadium "Chornomorets", Odesa
- Referee: Vitaliy Hodulian (Odesa)
- Attendance: 34,362
- Weather: 25 °C (77 °F)

The 2004 Ukrainian Super Cup became the first edition of Ukrainian Super Cup, an annual football match contested by the winners of the previous season's Ukrainian Top League and Ukrainian Cup competitions.

The match was played at the Central Stadium "Chornomorets", Odesa, on 10 July 2004, and contested by league winner Dynamo Kyiv and cup winner Shakhtar Donetsk. Dynamo won on penalties 6–5 after the regular time ended in 1-1 draw.

== Match ==
=== Details ===
10 July 2004
17:00 EEST

Dynamo Kyiv	1–1	Shakhtar Donetsk
Husiev 21'	Report; Report	Lewandowski 76'
Penalties
Rincón (penalty missed); Khatskevich (penalty missed); Shatskikh (penalty scored); Bidnenko (penalty missed); Byalkevich (penalty scored); Husiev (penalty scored); Gavrančić (penalty missed); El Kaddouri (penalty scored); Dmytrulin (penalty scored); Shovkovskyi (penalty scored)	6–5	(penalty missed) Vorobei; (penalty missed) Tymoshchuk; (penalty missed) Marica; (penalty scored) Lewandowski; (penalty scored) Stoican; (penalty scored) Raț; (penalty missed) Bakhariev; (penalty scored) Matuzalém; (penalty scored) Batista; (penalty missed) Bărcăuan

Central Stadium "Chornomorets", Odesa
Attendance: 34,362
Referee: Vitaliy Hodulian (Odesa)

Dynamo Kyiv	Shakhtar Donetsk

GK	1	(Ukraine) Oleksandr Shovkovskyi
DF	32	(Serbia and Montenegro) Goran Gavrančić
DF	3	(Ukraine) Serhii Fedorov
DF	6	(Ukraine) Yurii Dmytrulin
DF	30	(Morocco) Badr El Kaddouri	(yellow card) 28'
MF	14	(Ukraine) Andrii Husin		(substituted off) 74'
MF	33	(Ukraine) Ruslan Bidnenko
MF	10	(Romania) Florin Cernat	(yellow card) 38'	(substituted off) 52'
MF	8	(Belarus) Valyantsin Byalkevich (c)
MF	20	(Ukraine) Oleh Husiev
CF	16	(Uzbekistan) Maksim Shatskikh
Substitutes:
GK	21	(Ukraine) Vitalii Reva
MF	2	(Belarus) Alyaksandr Khatskevich		(substituted in) 74'
DF	5	(Brazil) Alessandro
MF	15	(Brazil) Diogo Rincón		(substituted in) 52'
DF	26	(Ukraine) Andrii Nesmachnyi
CF	27	(Belarus) Syarhey Karnilenka
MF	84	(Lithuania) Edgaras Česnauskis
Manager:
(Ukraine) Oleksii Mykhailychenko

GK	16	(Czech Republic) Jan Laštůvka
DF	2	(Romania) Cosmin Bărcăuan
DF	14	(Romania) Flavius Stoican
DF	26	(Romania) Răzvan Raț	(yellow card) 49'
DF	28	(Romania) Daniel Florea		(substituted off) 58'
DF	33	(Croatia) Darijo Srna		(substituted off) 66'
MF	10	(Ukraine) Anatolii Tymoshchuk (c)	(yellow card) 70'
MF	18	(Poland) Mariusz Lewandowski
MF	9	(Brazil) Matuzalém
CF	11	(Ukraine) Andrii Vorobei
CF	17	(Nigeria) Julius Aghahowa		(substituted off) 46'
Substitutes:
GK	30	(Russia) Aleksei Botvinyev
MF	7	(Brazil) João Batista		(substituted in) 66'
MF	8	(Ukraine) Oleksii Bakhariev		(substituted in) 58'
FW	20	(Ukraine) Oleksii Bielik
DF	21	(Serbia and Montenegro) Nenad Lalatović
FW	25	(Brazil) Brandão
FW	29	(Romania) Ciprian Marica	(yellow card) 48'	(substituted in) 46'
Manager:
(Romania) Mircea Lucescu

Assistant referees:

Vitaliy Zviahintsev (Odesa)
Oleh Kysliuk (Odesa)

FFU delegate:

Anatoliy Dyachenko (Poltava)

Match rules

- 90 minutes of regulation.
- No extra time of regulation if score is level.
- Penalty shoot-out if scores still level.
- Seven named substitutes, of which up to three may be used.
- No more than 9 foreign players on a field at one time for each team.

=== Statistics ===
First half
Statistic	Dynamo Kyiv	Shakhtar Donetsk
Goals scored	1	0
Total shots	4	6
Shots on target	2	3
Saves	3	1
Ball possession		
Corner kicks	2	0
Fouls committed		
Offsides	1	1
Yellow cards	2	0
Red cards	0	0

Overall
Statistic	Dynamo Kyiv	Shakhtar Donetsk
Goals scored	1	1
Total shots	9	16
Shots on target	8	5
Saves	4	7
Ball possession		
Corner kicks	2	4
Fouls committed		
Offsides	2	1
Yellow cards	2	3
Red cards	0	0

== Post-match reactions ==
In an interview to the Czech News Agency (CTK) the newly acquired Jan Laštůvka stated that Shakhtar was dictating the game tempo.

The penalty kick from goalkeeper Oleksandr Shovkovskyi became the game winner. In an interview he stated that decision on taking the shot was his own initiative.
