= 2017–18 FC Dynamo Kyiv season =

Dynamo Kyiv
2017–18 season
- President: Ihor Surkis
- Manager: Alyaksandr Khatskevich
- Stadium: NSC Olimpiyskiy; Dynamo Stadium (since Round 26)
- Ukrainian Premier League: 2nd
- Ukrainian Cup: Runners-up
- Ukrainian Super Cup: Runners-up
- UEFA Champions League: Third qualifying round
- UEFA Europa League: Round of 16
- Top goalscorer: League: Viktor Tsyhankov (13); All: Viktor Tsyhankov (17)
- Highest home attendance: 52,639 vs. Lazio
Home colours	Away colours	Third colours

The 2017–18 FC Dynamo Kyiv season was the 27th consecutive edition FC Dynamo Kyiv football top Ukrainian football league competition. Dynamo contested in the Premier League, Ukrainian Cup, UEFA Champions League, UEFA Europa League and Ukrainian Super Cup.

== Players ==
=== Squad information ===
As of 31 May 2018

Squad no.	Name	Nationality	Position	Date of birth (age)
Goalkeepers
1	Heorhiy Bushchan	Ukraine	GK	31 May 1994 (aged 24)
33	Volodymyr Makhankov ^{List B}	Ukraine	GK	29 October 1997 (aged 20)
71	Denys Boyko (on loan from Beşiktaş)	Ukraine	GK	29 January 1988 (aged 30)
72	Artur Rudko	Ukraine	GK	7 May 1992 (aged 26)
Defenders
2	Carlos Zambrano	Peru	DF	10 July 1989 (aged 28)
4	Aleksandar Pantić	Serbia	DF	11 April 1992 (aged 26)
23	Josip Pivarić	Croatia	DF	30 January 1989 (aged 29)
26	Mykyta Burda	Ukraine	DF	24 March 1995 (aged 23)
30	Artem Shabanov	Ukraine	DF	7 March 1992 (aged 26)
34	Yevhen Khacheridi	Ukraine	DF	28 July 1987 (aged 30)
42	Vitalii Mykolenko ^{List B}	Ukraine	DF	29 May 1999 (aged 19)
44	Tamás Kádár	Hungary	DF	14 March 1990 (aged 28)
46	Akhmed Alibekov ^{List B}	Ukraine	DF	29 May 1998 (aged 20)
48	Bohdan Lyednyev ^{List B}	Ukraine	DF	13 May 1996 (aged 22)
94	Tomasz Kędziora	Poland	DF	11 June 1994 (aged 23)
Midfielders
5	Serhiy Sydorchuk (Captain)	Ukraine	MF	2 May 1991 (aged 27)
7	Benjamin Verbič	Slovenia	MF	27 November 1993 (aged 24)
8	Volodymyr Shepelyev ^{List B}	Ukraine	MF	1 June 1997 (aged 20)
9	Mykola Morozyuk	Ukraine	MF	17 January 1988 (aged 30)
14	Vladyslav Kalitvintsev	Ukraine	MF	4 January 1993 (aged 25)
15	Viktor Tsyhankov ^{List B}	Ukraine	MF	15 November 1997 (aged 20)
17	Ruslan Rotan	Ukraine	MF	29 October 1981 (aged 36)
18	Nikita Korzun	Belarus	MF	6 March 1995 (aged 23)
19	Denys Harmash	Ukraine	MF	19 April 1990 (aged 28)
20	Oleh Husyev	Ukraine	MF	25 April 1983 (aged 35)
21	Mykyta Kravchenko ^{List B}	Ukraine	MF	14 June 1997 (aged 20)
25	Derlis González	Paraguay	MF	20 March 1994 (aged 24)
29	Vitaliy Buyalskyi	Ukraine	MF	6 January 1993 (aged 25)
31	Heorhiy Tsitaishvili ^{List B}	Ukraine	MF	18 November 2000 (aged 17)
45	Yevhen Smyrnyi ^{List B}	Ukraine	MF	15 August 1998 (aged 19)
	Bohdan Mykhaylychenko	Ukraine	MF	21 March 1997 (aged 21)
Forwards
11	Júnior Moraes	Brazil	FW	4 April 1987 (aged 31)
13	Dmytro Khlyobas	Ukraine	FW	9 May 1994 (aged 24)
40	Mykola Shaparenko ^{List B}	Ukraine	FW	4 October 1998 (aged 19)
41	Artem Besyedin ^{List B}	Ukraine	FW	31 March 1996 (aged 22)
43	Nazariy Rusyn ^{List B}	Ukraine	FW	25 October 1998 (aged 19)
47	Roman Vantukh ^{List B}	Ukraine	FW	4 July 1998 (aged 19)
70	Dieumerci Mbokani	(Democratic Republic of the Congo) Congo	FW	22 November 1985 (aged 32)

== Transfers ==
=== In ===
Date	Pos.	Player	Age	Moving from	Type	Fee	Source
Summer
13 June 2017	MF	(Ukraine) Oleh Husyev	34	Unattached	Transfer	Free	
11 July 2017	DF	(Poland) Tomasz Kędziora	23	(Poland) Lech Poznań	Transfer	€1.5M	
8 August 2017	DF	(Croatia) Josip Pivarić	28	(Croatia) Dinamo Zagreb	Transfer	€2M	
30 August 2017	DF	(Georgia (country)) Luka Lochoshvili	19	(Georgia (country)) Dinamo Tbilisi	Transfer	Undisclosed	
31 May 2017	DF	(Ukraine) Andriy Tsurikov	24	(Ukraine) FC Oleksandriya	Loan return		
31 May 2017	MF	(Ukraine) Serhiy Myakushko	24	(Ukraine) Vorskla Poltava	Loan return		
31 May 2017	FW	(Ukraine) Oleksandr Hladkyy	29	(Ukraine) Karpaty Lviv	Loan return		
31 May 2017	FW	(Ukraine) Dmytro Khlyobas	23	(Ukraine) Vorskla Poltava	Loan return		
30 June 2017	MF	(Morocco) Younès Belhanda	27	(France) Nice	Loan return		
30 June 2017	FW	(Democratic Republic of the Congo) Dieumerci Mbokani	31	(England) Hull City	Loan return		
30 June 2017	FW	(Brazil) Júnior Moraes	30	(China) Tianjin Quanjian	Loan return		
30 June 2017	FW	(Ukraine) Artem Kravets	27	(Spain) Granada	Loan return		
11 July 2017	FW	(Ukraine) Mykhaylo Plokhotnyuk	18	(Ukraine) Chornomorets Odesa	Loan		
Winter
1 January 2018	MF	(Slovenia) Benjamin Verbič	24	(Denmark) F.C. Copenhagen	Transfer	Undisclosed	
6 January 2018	DF	(Ukraine) Artem Shabanov	25	(Ukraine) Olimpik Donetsk	Transfer	Undisclosed	
12 January 2018	MF	(Ukraine) Ruslan Rotan	36	(Czech Republic) Slavia Prague	Transfer	Undisclosed	
30 January 2018	DF	(Peru) Carlos Zambrano	28	(Russia) Rubin Kazan	Transfer	Undisclosed	
1 January 2018	DF	(Ukraine) Pavlo Lukyanchuk	21	(Ukraine) Olimpik Donetsk	Loan return		
1 January 2018	DF	(Ukraine) Oleksandr Osman	21	(Ukraine) Karpaty Lviv	Loan return		
1 January 2018	DF	(Ukraine) Oleksandr Tymchyk	20	(Ukraine) Stal Kamianske	Loan return		
1 January 2018	MF	(Ukraine) Vladyslav Kalitvintsev	24	(Ukraine) Zorya Luhansk	Loan return		
1 January 2018	MF	(Ukraine) Bohdan Mykhaylychenko	20	(Ukraine) Stal Kamianske	Loan return		
1 January 2018	FW	(Colombia) Andrés Ramiro Escobar	26	(Brazil) Vasco da Gama	Loan return		
1 January 2018	FW	(Ukraine) Dmytro Khlyobas	23	(Belarus) Dinamo Minsk	Loan return		
10 February 2018	GK	(Ukraine) Denys Boyko	30	(Turkey) Beşiktaş	Loan		

=== Out ===
Date	Pos.	Player	Age	Moving to	Type	Fee	Source
Summer
16 June 2017	DF	(Ukraine) Andriy Tsurikov	24	(Ukraine) FC Oleksandriya	Transfer	Free	
1 July 2017	MF	(Morocco) Younès Belhanda	27	(Turkey) Galatasaray	Transfer	€8m	
3 August 2017	MF	(Ukraine) Valeriy Fedorchuk	28	(Ukraine) Veres Rivne	Transfer	Free	
9 August 2017	DF	(Ukraine) Serhiy Chobotenko	20	(Ukraine) Shakhtar Donetsk	Transfer	Free	
16 August 2017	FW	(Ukraine) Roman Yaremchuk	21	(Belgium) Gent	Transfer	€2m	
28 August 2017	FW	(Ukraine) Andriy Yarmolenko	27	(Germany) Borussia Dortmund	Transfer	€25m	
8 September 2017	MF	(Ukraine) Serhiy Myakushko	24	(Ukraine) Karpaty Lviv	Transfer	Free	
15 September 2017	FW	(Ukraine) Oleksandr Hladkyy	30	(Ukraine) Karpaty Lviv	Transfer	Free	
22 September 2017	MF	(Ukraine) Pavlo Orikhovskyi	21	(Ukraine) Chornomorets Odesa	Transfer	Free	
11 July 2017	DF	(Ukraine) Oleksandr Osman	21	(Ukraine) Karpaty Lviv	Loan		
11 July 2017	FW	(Ukraine) Oleksiy Schebetun	20	(Ukraine) Stal Kamianske	Loan		
12 July 2017	DF	(Ukraine) Pavlo Lukyanchuk	21	(Ukraine) Olimpik Donetsk	Loan		
12 July 2017	MF	(Ukraine) Bohdan Mykhaylychenko	20	(Ukraine) Stal Kamianske	Loan		
18 July 2017	DF	(Ukraine) Oleksandr Tymchyk	20	(Ukraine) Stal Kamianske	Loan		
20 July 2017	FW	(Ukraine) Dmytro Khlyobas	23	(Belarus) Dinamo Minsk	Loan		
21 July 2017	DF	(Portugal) Vitorino Antunes	30	(Spain) Getafe	Loan		
2 August 2017	GK	(Ukraine) Vadym Soldatenko	21	(Ukraine) Naftovyk-Ukrnafta	Loan		
16 August 2017	MF	(Ukraine) Oleksandr Andriyevskyi	23	(Ukraine) Zorya Luhansk	Loan		
1 September 2017	DF	(Ukraine) Zurab Ochigava	22	(Ukraine) Olimpik Donetsk	Loan		
8 September 2017	MF	(Ukraine) Serhiy Rybalka	27	(Turkey) Sivasspor	Loan		
Winter
3 January 2018	DF	(Croatia) Domagoj Vida	28	(Turkey) Beşiktaş	Transfer	Free	
15 January 2018	FW	(Ukraine) Artem Kravets	28	(Turkey) Kayserispor	Transfer	Free	
22 January 2018	FW	(Colombia) Andrés Ramiro Escobar	26	(Argentina) Estudiantes La Plata	Transfer	Free	
7 March 2018	FW	(Ukraine) Oleksiy Schebetun	26	(Belarus) Luch Minsk	Transfer	Free	
1 January 2018	DF	(Ukraine) Oleksandr Tymchyk	20	(Ukraine) Zorya Luhansk	Loan		
20 January 2018	GK	(Ukraine) Maksym Koval	25	(Spain) Deportivo La Coruña	Loan		
29 January 2018	DF	(Ukraine) Oleksandr Osman	21	(Ukraine) Arsenal Kyiv	Loan		
9 February 2018	DF	(Ukraine) Pavlo Lukyanchuk	21	(Ukraine) Veres Rivne	Loan		
29 March 2018	DF	(Georgia (country)) Luka Lochoshvili	19	(Georgia (country)) Dinamo Tbilisi	Loan		
1 January 2018	FW	(Ukraine) Mykhaylo Plokhotnyuk	18	(Ukraine) Chornomorets Odesa	Loan return		

== Pre-season and friendlies ==
30 June 2017 Friendly	Dynamo Kyiv (Ukraine)	4–0	(Austria) WSG Wattens	Wattens, Austria
20:00 EEST (UTC+03:00)	Kádár 55'; Buyalskyi 56'; Besyedin 72'; Jurdík 76' (o.g.)	Report		Stadium: Gernot Langes Stadion

1 July 2017 Friendly	Dynamo Kyiv (Ukraine)	1–1	(Romania) FC Botoșani	Stans, Austria
19:00 EEST (UTC+03:00)	Mykhaylychenko 35'	Report	Roman 18' (pen.)	Stadium: Sportplatz

4 July 2017 Friendly	Dynamo Kyiv (Ukraine)	2–1	(Azerbaijan) Gabala FK	Schwaz, Austria
19:00 EEST (UTC+03:00)	Khlyobas 13', 56'	Report	Mammadov 86'

5 July 2017 Friendly	Dynamo Kyiv (Ukraine)	2–0	(Romania) Universitatea Craiova	Schwaz, Austria
20:00 EEST (UTC+03:00)	Mbokani 68'; Yarmolenko 75'	Report

8 July 2017 Friendly	Dynamo Kyiv (Ukraine)	Cancelled	(Netherlands) Utrecht	Jenbach, Austria
EEST (UTC+03:00)		Report

8 July 2017 Friendly	Dynamo Kyiv (Ukraine)	3–0	(Austria) Wacker Innsbruck	Jenbach, Austria
19:00 EEST (UTC+03:00)	Besyedin 9', 64'; Khlyobas 24'	Report

9 July 2017 Friendly	Dynamo Kyiv (Ukraine)	4–1	(Czech Republic) Sparta Prague	Schwaz, Austria
19:00 EEST (UTC+03:00)	Yarmolenko 4'; Tsyhankov 33'; Harmash 51'; Mbokani 70'	Report	Frýdek 12'

23 July 2017 Friendly	Dynamo Kyiv (Ukraine)	1–1	(Israel) Maccabi Haifa	Kyiv
EEST (UTC+03:00)	Moraes	Report	Goal

2 September 2017 Friendly	Dynamo Kyiv (Ukraine)	7–0	(Belarus) Dinamo Brest	Kyiv
15:00 EEST (UTC+03:00)	Shaparenko 15'; Moraes 25', 60'; Alekseyev 65', 75', 80'; Rusyn 86'	Report		Stadium: Dynamo Stadium; Referee: Serhiy Boyko

8 October 2017 Friendly	Dynamo Kyiv (Ukraine)	1–2	(Ukraine) Olimpik Donetsk	Kyiv
13:00 EEST (UTC+03:00)	Rusyn 4'	Report	Moha 25' (pen.), 86'	Stadium: Dynamo Stadium; Referee: Volodymyr Novokhatniyi

19 January 2018 Friendly	Dynamo Kyiv (Ukraine)	0–2	(Switzerland) St. Gallen	Marbella, Spain
17:30 EET (UTC+02:00)		Report	Itten 34'; Tafer 87'	Stadium: Football Center

20 January 2018 Friendly	Dynamo Kyiv (Ukraine)	1–1	(Norway) Haugesund	Spain
17:30 EET (UTC+02:00)	González 28'	Report	Kallevåg 11'	Stadium: Arroyo Endemio sports complex

23 January 2018 Friendly	Dynamo Kyiv (Ukraine)	0–2	(Austria) Sturm Graz	La Línea de la Concepción, Spain
17:30 EET (UTC+02:00)		Report	Eze 10'; Schubert 50'	Stadium: City stadium

26 January 2018 Friendly	Dynamo Kyiv (Ukraine)	Cancelled	(Japan) Shonan Bellmare	Spain
EET (UTC+02:00)		Report

26 January 2018 Friendly	Dynamo Kyiv (Ukraine)	3–2	(Croatia) Osijek	Marbella, Spain
17:30 EET (UTC+02:00)	Khlyobas 7', 55'; Alekseyev 12'	Report	Verbič 1' (o.g.); Boban 78'	Stadium: Football Center

27 January 2018 Friendly	Dynamo Kyiv (Ukraine)	0–0	(Bulgaria) CSKA Sofia	Marbella, Spain
13:00 EET (UTC+02:00)		Report		Stadium: Football Center

3 February 2018 Friendly	Dynamo Kyiv (Ukraine)	2–2	(Sweden) Östersunds	Marbella, Spain
17:30 EEST (UTC+03:00)	Morozyuk 14'; Moraes 50'	Report	Nouri 31'; Ghoddos 45'	Stadium: City stadium

4 February 2018 Friendly	Dynamo Kyiv (Ukraine)	2–3	(Hungary) Puskás Akadémia	Dama da Noche, Spain
17:30 EEST (UTC+03:00)	Moraes 43'; Khlyobas 59'	Report	Diallo 14'; Szécsi 89'; Madarász 90'

7 February 2018 Friendly	Dynamo Kyiv (Ukraine)	2–1	Hebei China Fortune	Marbella, Spain
17:30 EEST (UTC+03:00)	Tsyhankov 58'; Verbič 84' (pen.)	Report	Hernanes 20'	Stadium: Football Center

8 February 2018 Friendly	Dynamo Kyiv (Ukraine)	3–1	(China) Tianjin TEDA	Marbella, Spain
17:30 EEST (UTC+03:00)	Khlyobas 33'; Besyedin 49'; Burda 53'	Report	Bastians 39'	Stadium: Football Center

10 February 2018 Friendly	Dynamo Kyiv (Ukraine)	5–0	(Hungary) Videoton	Marbella, Spain
17:30 EEST (UTC+03:00)	Shaparenko 7'; González 22'; Harmash 32'; Kędziora 57'; Mbokani 90'	Report		Stadium: Football Center

11 February 2018 Friendly	Dynamo Kyiv (Ukraine)	0–1	(Norway) Sarpsborg 08	Marbella, Spain
17:30 EEST (UTC+03:00)		Report	Jørgensen 7'	Stadium: City Stadium

== Competitions ==
=== Overall ===
Competition	First match	Last match	Starting round	Final position	Record							
Competition	First match	Last match	Starting round	Final position	Pld	W	D	L	GF	GA	GD	Win %
Premier League	18 July 2017	19 May 2018	Matchday 1	2nd	32	22	7	3	64	25	+39	68.75
Cup	25 October 2017	9 May 2018	Round of 16 (1/8)	Final	4	3	0	1	9	5	+4	75.00
Super Cup	15 July 2017	15 July 2017	Final	Final	1	0	0	1	0	2	−2	0.00
Champions League	25 July 2017	2 August 2017	3Q	3Q	2	1	0	1	3	3	+0	50.00
Europa League	17 August 2017	15 March 2018	Play off	Round of 16	12	5	5	2	21	15	+6	41.67
Total					51	31	12	8	97	50	+47	60.78

Last updated: 19 May 2018
Source: Competitions

=== Premier League ===
==== League table ====
Pos	Team	Pld	W	D	L	GF	GA	GD	Pts	Qualification or relegation
1	Shakhtar Donetsk (C)	32	24	3	5	71	24	+47	75	Qualification for the Champions League group stage
2	Dynamo Kyiv	32	22	7	3	64	25	+39	73	Qualification for the Champions League third qualifying round
3	Vorskla Poltava	32	14	7	11	37	35	+2	49	Qualification for the Europa League group stage (Note: Since the winners of the 2017–18 Ukrainian Cup, Shakhtar Donetsk, qualified for European competition based on league position, the spot awarded to the cup winners (Europa League group stage) was passed to the third-placed team, the spot awarded to the third-placed team (Europa League third qualifying round) was passed to the fourth-placed team, and the spot awarded to the fourth-placed team (Europa League second qualifying round) was passed to the fifth-placed team.)
4	Zorya Luhansk	32	11	10	11	44	44	0	43	Qualification for the Europa League third qualifying round
5	FC Mariupol	32	10	9	13	38	41	−3	39	Qualification for the Europa League second qualifying round

Source: Ukrainian Premier League (in Ukrainian), UEFA, Soccerway
Rules for classification: 1) Points; 2) Goal difference; 3) Goals scored; 4) Head-to-head points; 5) Head-to-head goal difference; 6) Head-to-head goals scored; 7) Draw.
(C) Champions
Notes:

Team 1	Agg.	Team 2	1st leg	2nd leg
Zirka Kropyvnytskyi	1–5	Desna Chernihiv	1–1	0–4
Chornomorets Odesa	1–3	FC Poltava	1–0	0–3 (a.e.t.)

==== Results summary ====
Overall								Home						Away					
Pld	W	D	L	GF	GA	GD	Pts	W	D	L	GF	GA	GD	W	D	L	GF	GA	GD
32	22	7	3	64	25	+39	73	13	3	0	40	8	+32	9	4	3	24	17	+7

Last updated: 19 May 2018.
Source: Competitive matches

==== Results by round ====
Round	1	2	3	4	5	6	7	8	9	10	11	12	13	14	15	16	17	18	19	20	21	22	23	24	25	26	27	28	29	30	31	32
Ground	H	A	H	A	H	H	A	H	A	H	A	A	H	A	H	A	A	H	A	H	A	H	H	H	A	H	A	A	A	H	A	H
Result	W	W	W	D	W	W	L	W	W	D	D	L	D	D	W	W	W	W	D	W	L	W	W	W	W	W	W	W	W	D	W	W
Position	3	1	1	1	1	1	2	2	1	2	2	2	2	2	2	2	2	2	2	2	2	2	2	2	2	2	2	2	2	2	2	2

Updated to match(es) played on 19 May 2018. Source: Competitive matches
A = Away; H = Home; W = Win; D = Draw; L = Loss

==== Matches ====
18 July 2017 1	Dynamo Kyiv	2–1	Chornomorets Odesa	Kyiv
19:00 EEST (UTC+03:00)	Shepelyev 22'; Yarmolenko 42'; Vida (yellow card) 60'	Report	Khoblenko 13'; Kapliyenko (yellow card) 60' (yellow-red card) 73'; Kovalets (yellow card) 83'	Stadium: Dynamo Stadium; Referee: Yuriy Hrysyo

22 July 2017 2	Shakhtar Donetsk	0–1	Dynamo Kyiv	Kharkiv
19:30 EEST (UTC+03:00)	Marlos (yellow card) 89'	Report	Mbokani 46'; González (yellow card) 53'; Koval (yellow card) 68'; Sydorchuk (yellow card) 84'; Khacheridi (yellow card) 85'; Korzun (yellow card) 88'	Stadium: OSC Metalist; Attendance: 14,168; Referee: Yuriy Mozharovsky

29 July 2017 3	Dynamo Kyiv	5–0	Karpaty Lviv	Kyiv
19:30 EEST (UTC+03:00)	Buyalskyi 8'; Tsyhankov 55', 62', 83'; Mbokani 58'; Khacheridi (yellow card) 71'; Kádár (yellow card) 74'	Report	Lebedenko (yellow card) 77'	Stadium: NSC Olimpiyskiy; Attendance: 7,489; Referee: Yaroslav Kozyk

6 August 2017 4	Vorskla Poltava	0–0	Dynamo Kyiv	Poltava
19:30 EEST (UTC+03:00)	Sharpar (yellow card) 51'; Sklyar (yellow card) 73'; Perduta (yellow card) 89'	Report	Sydorchuk (yellow card) 63'; Khacheridi (yellow card) 71'; Buyalskyi (yellow card) 89'; Kędziora (yellow card) 90'	Stadium: Vorskla Stadium; Attendance: 9,500; Referee: Anatoliy Abdula

11 August 2017 5	Dynamo Kyiv	3–0	Zirka Kropyvnytskyi	Kyiv
19:00 EEST (UTC+03:00)	Mbokani 48'; Yarmolenko 76' (pen.), 79'; Shepelyev (yellow card) 86'	Report	Tsyupa (yellow card) 42'	Stadium: NSC Olimpiyskiy; Attendance: 7,461; Referee: Vitaliy Romanov

20 August 2017 6	Dynamo Kyiv	4–1	Stal Kamianske	Kyiv
19:30 EEST (UTC+03:00)	Besyedin 7'; Kravets 26', 65'; Vida 40'	Report	Mysyk (yellow card) 42'; Kuzyk 54'; Gor Malakyan (yellow card) 55'	Stadium: NSC Olimpiyskiy; Attendance: 6,911; Referee: Kateryna Monzul

27 August 2017 7	FC Mariupol	3–0^{(1)}	Dynamo Kyiv	Mariupol
17:00 EEST (UTC+03:00)		Report		Stadium: Volodymyr Boiko Stadium; Attendance: 0 Referee: Yuriy Mozharovsky

10 September 2017 8	Dynamo Kyiv	3–0	FC Oleksandriya	Kyiv
19:30 EEST (UTC+03:00)	González (yellow card) 42'; Khacheridi 54'; Mbokani 54'; Tsyhankov 54'; Sydorchuk (yellow card) 55'	Report	Banada (yellow card) 42'	Stadium: NSC Olimpiyskiy; Attendance: 8,439; Referee: Oleksandr Derdo

17 September 2017 9	Olimpik Donetsk	1–2	Dynamo Kyiv	Kyiv
19:30 EEST (UTC+03:00)	Kravchenko (yellow card) 28'; Fedoriv (yellow card) 37'; Moha (yellow card) 38', (goal) 42'; Bohdanov (yellow card) 40'; Postupalenko (yellow card) 62'; Mikhalyov (yellow card) 78'	Report	Tsyhankov 20'; Vida (yellow card) 37'; Buyalskyi 45+1', (yellow card) 90+3'; González (yellow card) 59'; Kádár (yellow card) 78'	Stadium: Dynamo Stadium; Attendance: 7,000; Referee: Viktor Kopiyevskyi

23 September 2017 10	Dynamo Kyiv	0–0	Veres Rivne	Kyiv
19:30 EEST (UTC+03:00)	Sydorchuk (yellow card) 75'	Report	Serhiychuk (yellow card) 90'	Stadium: NSC Olimpiyskiy; Attendance: 0 Referee: Kostyantyn Trukhanov

1 October 2017 11	Zorya Luhansk	4–4	Dynamo Kyiv	Zaporizhia
19:30 EEST (UTC+03:00)	Sukhotskyi (yellow card) 31'; Hordiyenko (yellow card) 45'; Kharatin 56' (pen.); Iury (yellow card) 72', (goal) 75'; Silas 80'; Opanasenko 87'; Hrechyshkin (yellow card) 90+2'	Report	Mbokani 14', (yellow card) 90+2'; Buyalskyi 32'; Moraes 45+1'; Vida (yellow card) 55'; Khacheridi (yellow card) 71'; Tsyhankov (yellow card) 79'; Harmash 82', (yellow card) 83'	Stadium: Slavutych-Arena; Attendance: 8,253; Referee: Yaroslav Kozyk

15 October 2017 12	Chornomorets Odesa	2–1	Dynamo Kyiv	Odesa
19:30 EEST (UTC+03:00)	Kovalets 14'; Khoblenko 21'; Vasin (yellow card) 60'; Hutar (yellow card) 90+2'	Report	Kravets 78'; Mbokani (yellow card) 82'	Stadium: Chornomorets Stadium; Attendance: 9,683; Referee: Anatoliy Abdula

22 October 2017 13	Dynamo Kyiv	0–0	Shakhtar Donetsk	Kyiv
19:30 EEST (UTC+03:00)	Mbokani (yellow card) 16'; González (yellow card) 43'; Khacheridi (yellow card) 70'; Kędziora (yellow card) 90+3'	Report	Taison (yellow card) 52'	Stadium: NSC Olimpiyskiy; Attendance: 38,618; Referee: Vitaliy Romanov

29 October 2017 14	Karpaty Lviv	1–1	Dynamo Kyiv	Lviv
19:30 EET (UTC+02:00)	Myakushko 54'	Report	Vida 12'; Korzun (yellow card) 53'	Stadium: Ukraina Stadium; Attendance: 4,125; Referee: Kostyantyn Trukhanov

5 November 2017 15	Dynamo Kyiv	2–1	Vorskla Poltava	Kyiv
19:30 EET (UTC+02:00)	Moraes 26'; Buyalskyi 30'; Korzun (yellow card) 90+4'	Report	Chesnakov (yellow card) 22', (goal) 58'; Odaryuk (yellow card) 90'; Perduta (yellow card) 90+1'	Stadium: NSC Olimpiyskiy; Attendance: 7,129; Referee: Yaroslav Kozyk

18 November 2017 16	Zirka Kropyvnytskyi	0–2	Dynamo Kyiv	Kropyvnytskyi
14:00 EET (UTC+02:00)		Report	Khacheridi (yellow card) 7'; Mbokani 23', 31'	Stadium: Zirka Stadium; Attendance: 3,755; Referee: Oleksandr Derdo

26 November 2017 17	Stal Kamianske	0–2	Dynamo Kyiv	Kyiv
19:30 EET (UTC+03:00)	Yakymiv (yellow card) 49'; Klymchuk (yellow card) 70'	Report	Mbokani 13'; Shepelyev (yellow card) 45+2'; Khacheridi (yellow card) 49'; Morozyuk 51'; Mykolenko (yellow card) 72'; Tsyhankov (yellow card) 87'	Stadium: Obolon Arena; Attendance: 2,700; Referee: Viktor Kopiyevskyi

3 December 2017 18	Dynamo Kyiv	5–1	FC Mariupol	Kyiv
19:30 EET (UTC+02:00)	Harmash 28'; Tsyhankov 45+3'; Moraes 75', 84'; González 90'	Report	Yavorskyi (yellow card) 14' (yellow-red card) 68'; Bolbat 27'	Stadium: NSC Olimpiyskiy; Attendance: 6,147; Referee: Kostyantyn Trukhanov

10 December 2017 19	FC Oleksandriya	0–0	Dynamo Kyiv	Oleksandriya
14:00 EET (UTC+02:00)	Banada (yellow card) 15'; Hitchenko (yellow card) 67'; Pashayev (yellow card) 83'	Report	Pantić (yellow card) 47'; Besyedin (yellow card) 67' (yellow-red card) 78'; Buyalskyi (yellow card) 67'; Shepelyev (yellow card) 83'	Stadium: CSC Nika Stadium; Attendance: 2,228; Referee: Yuriy Mozharovsky

18 February 2018 20	Dynamo Kyiv	1–0	Olimpik Donetsk	Kyiv
17:00 EET (UTC+02:00)	Tsyhankov 24'; Kádár (yellow card) 26'; Burda (yellow card) 30'; Shepelyev (yellow card) 70'; Kędziora (yellow card) 75'; Rotan (yellow card) 82'	Report	Partsvania (yellow card) 56'	Stadium: NSC Olimpiyskiy; Attendance: 5,069; Referee: Viktor Kopiyevskyi

25 February 2018 21	Veres Rivne	3–1	Dynamo Kyiv	Lviv
17:00 EET (UTC+02:00)	Chesnakov 13'; Siminin 23' (pen.), (yellow card) 65' (yellow-red card) 72'; Bandura (yellow card) 57'; Stepanyuk 82', (yellow card) 82'	Report	Rotan (red card) 22'; Tsyhankov 42'; Kádár (yellow card) 48'; Morozyuk (yellow card) 55'; Burda (yellow card) 57' (yellow-red card) 67'	Stadium: Arena Lviv; Attendance: 2,721; Referee: Oleksandr Derdo

4 March 2018 22	Dynamo Kyiv	3–2	Zorya Luhansk	Kyiv
17:00 EET (UTC+02:00)	Boyko (yellow card) 11'; Verbič 58'; Tsyhankov 77'; Pivarić (yellow card) 83'; Kędziora 90+2'	Report	Hromov (yellow card) 28'; Silas (yellow card) 29'; Kharatin 49'; Iury 61'; Svatok (yellow card) 75'	Stadium: NSC Olimpiyskiy; Attendance: 4,317; Referee: Anatoliy Abdula

11 March 2018 23	Dynamo Kyiv	1–0	Veres Rivne	Kyiv
19:30 EET (UTC+02:00)	Moraes 14'; Shaparenko (yellow card) 70'	Report	Siminin (yellow card) 22'; Morozenko (yellow card) 48'; Adamyuk (yellow card) 51'	Stadium: NSC Olimpiyskiy; Attendance: 4,756; Referee: Kostyantyn Trukhanov

18 March 2018 24	Dynamo Kyiv	4–0	Vorskla Poltava	Kyiv
19:30 EET (UTC+02:00)	Besyedin 4'; Burda 54'; Tsyhankov 63' (pen.); Rotan (yellow card) 83'; Khlyobas 88'	Report		Stadium: NSC Olimpiyskiy; Attendance: 3,745; Referee: Viktor Kopiyevskyi

1 April 2018 25	FC Mariupol	2–3	Dynamo Kyiv	Mariupol
17:00 EEST (UTC+03:00)	Totovytskyi 28', 78'; Dedechko (yellow card) 66'	Report	Besyedin 48'; Harmash (yellow card) 58'; Burda (yellow card) 62'; Shaparenko 65'; Tsyhankov 72'; Boyko (yellow card) 90+3'	Stadium: Volodymyr Boiko Stadium; Attendance: 10,742; Referee: Yuriy Mozharovsky

7 April 2018 26	Dynamo Kyiv	4–0	Zorya Luhansk	Kyiv
14:00 EEST (UTC+03:00)	Burda 13'; Verbič 51'; Besyedin 54'; Tsyhankov 88'	Report	Hromov (yellow card) 48'; Checher (yellow card) 72'; Babenko (yellow card) 79'	Stadium: Dynamo Stadium; Attendance: 12,876; Referee: Oleksandr Derdo

14 April 2018 27	Shakhtar Donetsk	0–1	Dynamo Kyiv	Kharkiv
17:00 EEST (UTC+03:00)	Ferreyra (yellow card) 5'; Rakitskiy (yellow card) 55'; Khocholava (yellow card) 74'; Taison (yellow card) 90+1' (yellow-red card) 90+4'	Report	Shepelyev 33'; Harmash (yellow card) 54'; Verbič (yellow card) 63'; Shabanov (yellow card) 71'; Mbokani (yellow card) 90+4'	Stadium: OSC Metalist; Attendance: 26,679; Referee: Kostyantyn Trukhanov

22 April 2018 28	Veres Rivne	1–4	Dynamo Kyiv	Lviv
17:00 EEST (UTC+03:00)	Julio Cesar 51'	Report	Harmash 14'; Buyalskyi (yellow card) 17'; Burda (yellow card) 28'; Besyedin 47', 53'; González 90+3'	Stadium: Arena Lviv; Attendance: 6,224; Referee: Vitaliy Romanov

29 April 2018 29	Vorskla Poltava	0–1	Dynamo Kyiv	Poltava
19:30 EEST (UTC+03:00)	Chesnakov (yellow card) 32'; Dallku (yellow card) 60'; Chyzhov (yellow card) 77'	Report	Pivarić (yellow card) 4'; Mbokani 63'	Stadium: Vorskla Stadium; Attendance: 14,000; Referee: Oleksandr Derdo

4 May 2018 30	Dynamo Kyiv	1–1	FC Mariupol	Kyiv
19:00 EEST (UTC+03:00)	Besyedin (yellow card) 20'; Tsyhankov 55' (pen.)	Report	Boryachuk 16', (yellow card) 52'; Myshnyov (yellow card) 49'; Bykov (yellow card) 56'; Bolbat (yellow card) 90+2'	Stadium: Dynamo Stadium; Attendance: 7,869; Referee: Anatoliy Abdula

13 May 2018 31	Zorya Luhansk	0–1	Dynamo Kyiv	Zaporizhia
19:30 EEST (UTC+03:00)	Hordiyenko (yellow card) 15'; Kharatin (yellow card) 27'; Silas (yellow card) 39'; Kocherhin (yellow card) 60'; Checher (yellow card) 77'	Report	Verbič 68'; Besyedin (yellow card) 81'; Kádár (yellow card) 84'	Stadium: Slavutych-Arena; Attendance: 6,256; Referee: Viktor Kopiyevskyi

19 May 2018 32	Dynamo Kyiv	2–1	Shakhtar Donetsk	Kyiv
19:30 EEST (UTC+03:00)	Verbič 16', (yellow card) 90+2'; Kędziora (yellow card) 45'; Buyalskyi (yellow card) 52'; Khocholava 56' (o.g.); Kádár (yellow card) 77'; Sydorchuk (yellow card) 84'; Harmash (yellow card) 90'; Boyko (yellow card) 90+3'	Report	Marlos 23' (pen.)	Stadium: Dynamo Stadium; Attendance: 15,837; Referee: Vitaliy Romanov

Notes:

- ^(1) Dynamo Kyiv was assigned 3–0 defeat by FFU, after they refused to play the match in Mariupol

=== Ukrainian Cup ===
25 October 2017 Round of 16 (1/8)	FC Oleksandriya	2–3	Dynamo Kyiv	Oleksandriya
19:30 EEST (UTC+03:00)	Basov (yellow card) 31'; Starenkyi 77'; Polyarus (yellow card) 118'; Hrytsuk 120+5' (pen.)	Report	Kravets 36', 116', (yellow card) 62'; Harmash (yellow card) 90+2'; Besyedin 107'; Khacheridi (yellow card) 120+4'	Stadium: CSC Nika Stadium; Attendance: 1,802; Referee: Yuriy Mozharovsky

29 November 2017 Quarterfinal	Desna Chernihiv	0–2	Dynamo Kyiv	Chernihiv
19:30 EET (UTC+02:00)		Report	Harmash 6'; Rusyn 90+4'	Stadium: Chernihiv Stadium; Attendance: 11,467; Referee: Yuriy Mozharovsky

18 April 2018 Semifinal	Dnipro-1	1–4	Dynamo Kyiv	Dnipro
19:00 EET (UTC+02:00)	Kohut (yellow card) 30', (goal) 58'; Brovchenko (yellow card) 86'	Report	Tsyhankov 28' (pen.); Shepelyev 38'; Besyedin 44'; Verbič 66'	Stadium: Dnipro-Arena; Attendance: 12,214; Referee: Yaroslav Kozyk

9 May 2018 Final	Dynamo Kyiv	0–2	Shakhtar Donetsk	Dnipro
20:30 EET (UTC+02:00)	Besyedin (yellow card) 28'; Kędziora (yellow card) 63'; Shepelyev (yellow card) 68'; Harmash (yellow card) 80'	Report	Fred (yellow card) 32'; Ferreyra 47'; Rakitskiy 61'; Stepanenko (yellow card) 83'	Stadium: Dnipro-Arena; Attendance: 28,155; Referee: Yuriy Mozharovskyi

=== Ukrainian Super Cup ===
15 July 2017 Final	Shakhtar Donetsk	2–0	Dynamo Kyiv	Odesa
21:00 EEST (UTC+03:00)	Ferreyra 8', 56'; Stepanenko (yellow card) 28' (yellow-red card) 80'; Bernard (yellow card) 32'	Report	Buyalskyi (yellow card) 45'; Sydorchuk (yellow card) 90+2'	Stadium: Chornomorets Stadium; Attendance: 34,146; Referee: Kostyantyn Trukhanov

=== UEFA Champions League ===
26 July 2017 3Q	Dynamo Kyiv (Ukraine)	3–1	(Switzerland) Young Boys	Kyiv
19:30 EEST (UTC+03:00)	Yarmolenko 15'; Mbokani 34'; Harmash 90+3'	Report	Nuhu (yellow card) 15' von Bergen (yellow card) 34'; Fassnacht 90+1'	Stadium: NSC Olimpiyskiy; Referee: Andreas Ekberg

2 August 2017 3Q	Young Boys (Switzerland)	2–0 (3–3 agg.)	(Ukraine) Dynamo Kyiv	Bern, Switzerland
21:15 EEST (UTC+03:00)	Mbabu (yellow card) 8'; Hoarau 13' (pen.), (yellow card) 57'; Lotomba 90'	Report	Sydorchuk (yellow card) 28'; Shepelyev (yellow card) 55'; Vida (yellow card) 60'; Kádár (yellow card) 73'; González (yellow card) 76'; Koval (yellow card) 78'; Khacheridi (yellow card) 90+4'	Stadium: Stade de Suisse; Referee: Pawel Gil

=== Europa League ===
17 August 2017 Play-off	Marítimo (Portugal)	0–0	(Ukraine) Dynamo Kyiv	Funchal, Portugal
22:30 EEST (UTC+3)	João Gamboa (yellow card) 30'; Şen (yellow card) 82'; Ibson (yellow card) 84'	Report	Harmash (yellow card) 30'; Kádár (yellow card) 55'; Sydorchuk (yellow card) 60'; Yarmolenko (yellow card) 63'; Khacheridi (yellow card) 80' (yellow-red card) 89'	Stadium: Estádio do Marítimo; Referee: Jakob Kehlet

24 August 2017 Play off	Dynamo Kyiv (Ukraine)	3–1 (3–1 agg.)	(Portugal) Marítimo	Kyiv
19:30 EEST (UTC+3)	Kędziora (yellow card) 8'; Harmash 33', (yellow card) 74'; Morozyuk 35'; González (yellow card) 36', (goal) 61'; Kádár (yellow card) 52'; Buyalskyi (yellow card) 81'	Report	Charles (yellow card) 33'; Éber Bessa (yellow card) 36'; Şen 68'	Stadium: NSC Olimpiyskiy; Referee: Liran Liany

==== Group stage ====
Pos	Team	Pld	W	D	L	GF	GA	GD	Pts	Qualification	DKV	PAR	YB	SKE
1	(Ukraine) Dynamo Kyiv	6	4	1	1	15	9	+6	13	Advance to knockout phase	—	4–1	2–2	3–1
2	(Serbia) Partizan	6	2	2	2	8	9	−1	8	Advance to knockout phase	2–3	—	2–1	2–0
3	(Switzerland) Young Boys	6	1	3	2	7	8	−1	6		0–1	1–1	—	2–1
4	(Albania) Skënderbeu	6	1	2	3	6	10	−4	5		3–2	0–0	1–1	—

Source: UEFA
Rules for classification: Group stage tiebreakers

14 September 2017 1	Dynamo Kyiv (Ukraine)	3–1	(Albania) Skënderbeu Korçë	Kyiv
20:00 EEST (UTC+3)	González (yellow card) 23'; Sydorchuk 47'; Moraes 49'; Mbokani 65' (pen.); Buyalskyi (yellow card) 72'	Report	Muzaka 39', (yellow card) 41'; Vangjeli (yellow card) 57'; Mici (yellow card) 64'; Radaš (yellow card) 89'	Stadium: NSC Olimpiyskiy; Referee: Bart Vertenten

28 September 2017 2	Partizan (Serbia)	2–3	(Ukraine) Dynamo Kyiv	Belgrade, Serbia
22:00 EEST (UTC+3)	Ožegović 34'; Tawamba 42', (yellow card) 83'; Janković (yellow card) 47'; Everton Luiz (yellow card) 63'	Report	Kravets (yellow card) 29'; Moraes 54' (pen.), 84'; Buyalskyi 68', (yellow card) 79'	Stadium: Partizan Stadium; Attendance: 0 Referee: Svein Oddvar Moen

19 October 2017 3	Dynamo Kyiv (Ukraine)	2–2	(Switzerland) Young Boys	Kyiv
22:00 EEST (UTC+3)	Mbokani 34'; Morozyuk 49'	Report	Assalé 17', 40'; Fassnacht (yellow card) 47'; Mbabu (yellow card) 54'; Sanogo (yellow card) 62' (yellow-red card) 82'	Stadium: NSC Olimpiyskiy; Referee: Mattias Gestranius

2 November 2017 4	Young Boys (Switzerland)	0–1	(Ukraine) Dynamo Kyiv	Bern, Switzerland
20:00 EEST (UTC+3)	Aebischer (yellow card) 31'	Report	Korzun (yellow card) 11'; Kravets (yellow card) 65'; Buyalskyi 70', (yellow card) 75'; Harmash (yellow card) 90+2'	Stadium: Stade de Suisse; Referee: Tony Chapron

23 November 2017 5	Skënderbeu Korçë (Albania)	3–2	(Ukraine) Dynamo Kyiv	Elbasan, Albania
22:00 EET (UTC+02:00)	Lilaj 18'; Adeniyi 52', (yellow card) 90+2'; Sowe 56'; Radaš (yellow card) 78'	Report	Tsyhankov 16'; Rusyn 90+1'; Buschan (yellow card) 90+3'	Stadium: Elbasan Arena; Referee: Oliver Drachta

7 December 2017 6	Dynamo Kyiv (Ukraine)	4–1	(Serbia) Partizan	Kyiv
20:00 EET (UTC+02:00)	Morozyuk 6', (yellow card) 62'; Moraes 28', 31', 77' (pen.); Shepelyev (yellow card) 90+1'	Report	Everton Luiz (yellow card) 40'; Jevtović 45+4' (pen.); Miletić (yellow card) 48'; Đuričković (yellow card) 89'	Stadium: NSC Olimpiyskiy; Referee: Pawel Gil

==== Knockout phase ====
===== Round of 32 =====
15 February 2018 First leg	AEK Athens (Greece)	1–1	(Ukraine) Dynamo Kyiv	Athens, Greece
22:00 EET (UTC+02:00)	Livaja (yellow card) 22'; Vranješ (yellow card) 45'; Ajdarević 80'	Report	Khacheridi (yellow card) 5'; Tsyhankov 19'; Harmash (yellow card) 30'; Shepelyev (yellow card) 71'; Moraes (yellow card) 77'; González (yellow card) 81'	Stadium: Olympic Stadium (Athens); Attendance: 30,518; Referee: Carlos del Cerro Grande

22 February 2018 Second leg	Dynamo Kyiv (Ukraine)	0–0 (1–1 agg.)	(Greece) AEK Athens	Kyiv
20:00 EET (UTC+02:00)	Moraes (yellow card) 90+3'	Report	Simões (yellow card) 19'; Galanopoulos (yellow card) 29'; Galo (yellow card) 59'; Shojaei (yellow card) 80'; Chyhrynskyi (yellow card) 90'; Araujo (yellow card) 90+2'	Stadium: NSC Olimpiyskiy; Attendance: 27,024; Referee: Matej Jug

===== Round of 16 =====
8 March 2018 First leg	Lazio (Italy)	2–2	(Ukraine) Dynamo Kyiv	Rome, Italy
22:00 EET (UTC+02:00)	Immobile 54'; Felipe Anderson 62'; Murgia (yellow card) 63'; Milinković-Savić (yellow card) 71'; Lukaku (yellow card) 81'	Report	Pivarić (yellow card) 36'; Tsyhankov 52'; Kádár (yellow card) 69'; Harmash (yellow card) 70' (yellow-red card) 90+7'; Moraes 79'; Boyko (yellow card) 90+1'	Stadium: Stadio Olimpico; Referee: Ivan Kružliak

15 March 2018 Second leg	Dynamo Kyiv (Ukraine)	0–2 (2–4 agg.)	(Italy) Lazio	Kyiv
20:00 EET (UTC+02:00)	Moraes (yellow card) 55'; Shabanov (yellow card) 66'; Buyalskyi (yellow card) 90+3'	Report	Luiz Felipe (yellow card) 18'; Lucas Leiva 23' de Vrij 83'	Stadium: NSC Olimpiyskiy; Attendance: 52,639; Referee: Jesús Gil Manzano

== Statistics ==
=== Appearances and goals ===
No.	Pos	Nat	Player	Total		Premier League		Cup		Super Cup		CL		Europa League	
No.	Pos	Nat	Player	Apps	Goals	Apps	Goals	Apps	Goals	Apps	Goals	Apps	Goals	Apps	Goals
Goalkeepers
1	GK	(Ukraine) UKR	Heorhiy Buschan	12	0	6	0	2+1	0	0	0	0	0	3	0
71	GK	(Ukraine) UKR	Denys Boyko	18	0	12	0	2	0	0	0	0	0	4	0
72	GK	(Ukraine) UKR	Artur Rudko	3	0	2	0	0	0	1	0	0	0	0	0
Defenders
4	DF	(Serbia) SRB	Aleksandar Pantić	5	0	1+1	0	2	0	0	0	0	0	0+1	0
23	DF	(Croatia) CRO	Josip Pivarić	31	0	20+1	0	1+1	0	0	0	0	0	8	0
26	DF	(Ukraine) UKR	Mykyta Burda	17	2	12	2	3	0	0	0	0	0	2	0
30	DF	(Ukraine) UKR	Artem Shabanov	10	0	8	0	1	0	0	0	0	0	0+1	0
34	DF	(Ukraine) UKR	Yevhen Khacheridi	28	1	17	1	1	0	1	0	2	0	7	0
42	DF	(Ukraine) UKR	Vitalii Mykolenko	7	0	4+1	0	2	0	0	0	0	0	0	0
44	DF	(Hungary) HUN	Tamás Kádár	36	0	21	0	2	0	0	0	2	0	11	0
46	DF	(Ukraine) UKR	Akhmed Alibekov	4	0	0+2	0	0+2	0	0	0	0	0	0	0
48	DF	(Ukraine) UKR	Bohdan Lyednyev	1	0	0	0	0+1	0	0	0	0	0	0	0
94	DF	(Poland) POL	Tomasz Kędziora	36	1	22	1	4	0	0	0	0	0	10	0
Midfielders
5	MF	(Ukraine) UKR	Serhiy Sydorchuk	18	1	9+1	0	0	0	1	0	2	0	5	1
7	MF	(Slovenia) SVN	Benjamin Verbič	14	5	9+3	4	1+1	1	0	0	0	0	0	0
8	MF	(Ukraine) UKR	Volodymyr Shepelyev	39	3	18+6	2	4	1	0+1	0	2	0	5+3	0
9	MF	(Ukraine) UKR	Mykola Morozyuk	33	4	17+1	1	0	0	1	0	2	0	10+2	3
15	MF	(Ukraine) UKR	Viktor Tsyhankov	40	17	24+3	13	2	1	1	0	0+1	0	8+1	3
17	MF	(Ukraine) UKR	Ruslan Rotan	10	0	5+4	0	1	0	0	0	0	0	0	0
18	MF	(Belarus) BLR	Nikita Korzun	12	0	4+3	0	0+1	0	0	0	0+2	0	2	0
19	MF	(Ukraine) UKR	Denys Harmash	42	6	20+6	3	3	1	1	0	2	1	8+2	1
20	MF	(Ukraine) UKR	Oleh Husyev	5	0	2+2	0	0	0	0	0	0	0	0+1	0
25	MF	(Paraguay) PAR	Derlis González	33	3	12+6	2	2	0	0+1	0	2	0	8+2	1
29	MF	(Ukraine) UKR	Vitaliy Buyalskyi	42	6	24+2	4	2	0	1	0	0+2	0	11	2
31	MF	(Ukraine) UKR	Heorhiy Tsitaishvili	1	0	0	0	0+1	0	0	0	0	0	0	0
45	MF	(Ukraine) UKR	Yevhen Smyrnyi	1	0	0	0	1	0	0	0	0	0	0	0
Forwards
11	FW	(Brazil) BRA	Júnior Moraes	30	12	10+8	5	1	0	0	0	0	0	7+4	7
13	FW	(Ukraine) UKR	Dmytro Khlyobas	1	1	0+1	1	0	0	0	0	0	0	0	0
40	FW	(Ukraine) UKR	Mykola Shaparenko	20	1	7+6	1	2	0	0	0	0	0	2+3	0
41	FW	(Ukraine) UKR	Artem Besyedin	36	8	13+10	6	3+1	2	0+1	0	0	0	3+5	0
43	FW	(Ukraine) UKR	Nazariy Rusyn	3	2	0+1	0	0+1	1	0	0	0	0	0+1	1
70	FW	(Democratic Republic of the Congo) COD	Dieumerci Mbokani	31	12	15+6	9	1+1	0	1	0	2	1	4+1	2
Players transferred out during the season
5	DF	(Portugal) POR	Vitorino Antunes	1	0	0	0	0	0	1	0	0	0	0	0
10	FW	(Ukraine) UKR	Andriy Yarmolenko	11	4	5+1	3	0	0	1	0	2	1	2	0
22	FW	(Ukraine) UKR	Artem Kravets	15	5	2+7	3	1	2	0	0	0+1	0	1+3	0
24	DF	(Croatia) CRO	Domagoj Vida	18	2	9	2	0	0	1	0	2	0	6	0
35	GK	(Ukraine) UKR	Maksym Koval	18	0	11	0	0	0	0	0	2	0	5	0

Source: Competitions

Last updated: 19 May 2018

=== Goalscorers ===
Rank	No.	Pos	Nat	Name	Premier League	Cup	Super Cup	CL	Europa League	Total
1	15	MF	(Ukraine)	Viktor Tsyhankov	13	1	0	0	3	17
2	11	FW	(Brazil)	Júnior Moraes	5	0	0	0	7	12
2	70	FW	(Democratic Republic of the Congo)	Dieumerci Mbokani	9	0	0	1	2	12
4	41	FW	(Ukraine)	Artem Besyedin	6	2	0	0	0	8
5	19	MF	(Ukraine)	Denys Harmash	3	1	0	1	1	6
5	29	MF	(Ukraine)	Vitaliy Buyalskyi	4	0	0	0	2	6
7	7	MF	(Slovenia)	Benjamin Verbič	4	1	0	0	0	5
7	22	FW	(Ukraine)	Artem Kravets	3	2	0	0	0	5
9	9	MF	(Ukraine)	Mykola Morozyuk	1	0	0	0	3	4
9	10	FW	(Ukraine)	Andriy Yarmolenko	3	0	0	1	0	4
11	8	MF	(Ukraine)	Volodymyr Shepelyev	2	1	0	0	0	3
11	25	MF	(Paraguay)	Derlis González	2	0	0	0	1	3
13	24	DF	(Croatia)	Domagoj Vida	2	0	0	0	0	2
13	26	DF	(Ukraine)	Mykyta Burda	2	0	0	0	0	2
13	43	FW	(Ukraine)	Nazariy Rusyn	0	1	0	0	1	2
16	5	MF	(Ukraine)	Serhiy Sydorchuk	0	0	0	0	1	1
16	40	FW	(Ukraine)	Mykola Shaparenko	1	0	0	0	0	1
16	13	FW	(Ukraine)	Dmytro Khlyobas	1	0	0	0	0	1
16	34	DF	(Ukraine)	Yevhen Khacheridi	1	0	0	0	0	1
16	94	DF	(Poland)	Tomasz Kędziora	1	0	0	0	0	1
				Own goal	1	0	0	0	0	1
				Total	64	9	0	3	21	97

Last updated: 19 May 2018

=== Clean sheets ===
Rank	No.	Pos	Nat	Name	Premier League	Cup	Super Cup	CL	Europa League	Total
1	35	GK	(Ukraine)	Maksym Koval	6	0	0	1	1	8
1	71	GK	(Ukraine)	Denys Boyko	7	0	0	0	1	8
3	1	GK	(Ukraine)	Heorhiy Buschan	3	2	0	0	1	6
4	72	GK	(Ukraine)	Artur Rudko	1	0	0	0	0	1
				Total	16	2	0	1	3	22

Last updated: 19 May 2018

=== Disciplinary record ===
No.	Pos	Nat	Player	Premier League			Cup			Super Cup			CL			Europa League			Total		
No.	Pos	Nat	Player	Booked	(yellow card) (yellow-red card)	Sent off (straight red)	Booked	(yellow card) (yellow-red card)	Sent off (straight red)	Booked	(yellow card) (yellow-red card)	Sent off (straight red)	Booked	(yellow card) (yellow-red card)	Sent off (straight red)	Booked	(yellow card) (yellow-red card)	Sent off (straight red)	Booked	(yellow card) (yellow-red card)	Sent off (straight red)
1	GK	(Ukraine)	Heorhiy Buschan	0	0	0	0	0	0	0	0	0	0	0	0	1	0	0	1	0	0
2	DF	(Serbia)	Aleksandar Pantić	1	0	0	0	0	0	0	0	0	0	0	0	0	0	0	1	0	0
5	MF	(Ukraine)	Serhiy Sydorchuk	5	0	0	0	0	0	1	0	0	1	0	0	1	0	0	8	0	0
7	MF	(Slovenia)	Benjamin Verbič	2	0	0	0	0	0	0	0	0	0	0	0	0	0	0	2	0	0
8	MF	(Ukraine)	Volodymyr Shepelyev	4	0	0	1	0	0	0	0	0	1	0	0	2	0	0	8	0	0
9	MF	(Ukraine)	Mykola Morozyuk	1	0	0	0	0	0	0	0	0	0	0	0	1	0	0	2	0	0
10	FW	(Ukraine)	Andriy Yarmolenko	0	0	0	0	0	0	0	0	0	0	0	0	1	0	0	1	0	0
11	FW	(Brazil)	Júnior Moraes	0	0	0	0	0	0	0	0	0	0	0	0	2	0	0	2	0	0
15	MF	(Ukraine)	Viktor Tsyhankov	2	0	0	0	0	0	0	0	0	0	0	0	1	0	0	3	0	0
17	MF	(Ukraine)	Ruslan Rotan	2	0	1	0	0	0	0	0	0	0	0	0	0	0	0	2	0	1
18	MF	(Belarus)	Nikita Korzun	3	0	0	0	0	0	0	0	0	0	0	0	1	0	0	4	0	0
19	MF	(Ukraine)	Denys Harmash	4	0	0	2	0	0	0	0	0	0	0	0	4	1	0	10	1	0
22	FW	(Ukraine)	Artem Kravets	0	0	0	1	0	0	0	0	0	0	0	0	2	0	0	3	0	0
23	DF	(Croatia)	Josip Pivarić	2	0	0	0	0	0	0	0	0	0	0	0	1	0	0	3	0	0
24	DF	(Croatia)	Domagoj Vida	3	0	0	0	0	0	0	0	0	1	0	0	0	0	0	4	0	0
25	MF	(Paraguay)	Derlis González	4	0	0	0	0	0	0	0	0	1	0	0	3	0	0	8	0	0
26	DF	(Ukraine)	Mykyta Burda	3	1	0	0	0	0	0	0	0	0	0	0	0	0	0	3	1	0
29	MF	(Ukraine)	Vitaliy Buyalskyi	5	0	0	0	0	0	1	0	0	0	0	0	5	0	0	11	0	0
30	DF	(Ukraine)	Artem Shabanov	1	0	0	0	0	0	0	0	0	0	0	0	1	0	0	2	0	0
34	DF	(Ukraine)	Yevhen Khacheridi	7	0	0	1	0	0	0	0	0	1	0	0	1	1	0	10	1	0
35	GK	(Ukraine)	Maksym Koval	1	0	0	0	0	0	0	0	0	1	0	0	0	0	0	2	0	0
40	FW	(Ukraine)	Mykola Shaparenko	1	0	0	0	0	0	0	0	0	0	0	0	0	0	0	1	0	0
41	FW	(Ukraine)	Artem Besyedin	3	1	0	1	0	0	0	0	0	0	0	0	0	0	0	4	1	0
42	DF	(Ukraine)	Vitalii Mykolenko	1	0	0	0	0	0	0	0	0	0	0	0	0	0	0	1	0	0
44	DF	(Hungary)	Tamás Kádár	6	0	0	0	0	0	0	0	0	1	0	0	3	0	0	10	0	0
70	FW	(Democratic Republic of the Congo)	Dieumerci Mbokani	3	0	0	0	0	0	0	0	0	0	0	0	0	0	0	3	0	0
71	GK	(Ukraine)	Denys Boyko	3	0	0	0	0	0	0	0	0	0	0	0	1	0	0	4	0	0
94	DF	(Poland)	Tomasz Kędziora	4	0	0	1	0	0	0	0	0	0	0	0	1	0	0	6	0	0
			Total	71	2	1	7	0	0	2	0	0	7	0	0	32	2	0	119	4	1

Last updated: 19 May 2018
