= 2018–19 FC Dynamo Kyiv season =

Dynamo Kyiv
2018–19 season
- President: Ihor Surkis
- Manager: Alyaksandr Khatskevich
- Stadium: NSC Olimpiyskiy
- Ukrainian Premier League: 2nd
- Ukrainian Cup: Quarter-finals
- Ukrainian Super Cup: Winners
- UEFA Champions League: Play-off round
- UEFA Europa League: Round of 16
- Top goalscorer: League: Viktor Tsyhankov (18); All: Viktor Tsyhankov (20)
Home colours	Away colours	Third colours

The 2018–19 season was the 28th consecutive season in the top Ukrainian football league for Dynamo Kyiv. Dynamo competed in the Premier League, Ukrainian Cup, UEFA Champions League, UEFA Europa League and 2018 Ukrainian Super Cup.

== Players ==
=== Squad information ===
As of 31 May 2019

Squad no.	Name	Nationality	Position	Date of birth (age)
Goalkeepers
1	Heorhiy Bushchan	(Ukraine)	GK	31 May 1994 (aged 25)
33	Volodymyr Makhankov ^{List B}	(Ukraine)	GK	29 October 1997 (aged 21)
71	Denys Boyko	(Ukraine)	GK	29 January 1988 (aged 31)
72	Artur Rudko	(Ukraine)	GK	7 May 1992 (aged 27)
Defenders
16	Vitaliy Mykolenko ^{List B}	(Ukraine)	DF	29 May 1999 (aged 20)
23	Josip Pivarić	(Croatia)	DF	30 January 1989 (aged 30)
26	Mykyta Burda	(Ukraine)	DF	24 March 1995 (aged 24)
30	Artem Shabanov	(Ukraine)	DF	7 March 1992 (aged 27)
44	Tamás Kádár	(Hungary)	DF	14 March 1990 (aged 29)
46	Akhmed Alibekov ^{List B}	(Ukraine)	DF	29 May 1998 (aged 21)
49	Denys Popov ^{List B}	(Ukraine)	DF	17 February 1999 (aged 20)
94	Tomasz Kędziora	(Poland)	DF	11 June 1994 (aged 24)
Midfielders
5	Serhiy Sydorchuk (Captain)	(Ukraine)	MF	2 May 1991 (aged 28)
7	Benjamin Verbič	(Slovenia)	MF	27 November 1993 (aged 25)
8	Volodymyr Shepelyev ^{List B}	(Ukraine)	MF	1 June 1997 (aged 21)
14	Carlos de Pena	(Uruguay)	MF	11 March 1992 (aged 27)
15	Viktor Tsyhankov ^{List B}	(Ukraine)	MF	15 November 1997 (aged 21)
17	Sidcley	(Brazil)	MF	13 May 1993 (aged 26)
18	Oleksandr Andriyevskyi	(Ukraine)	MF	24 June 1994 (aged 24)
19	Denys Harmash	(Ukraine)	MF	19 April 1990 (aged 29)
21	Mykyta Kravchenko ^{List B}	(Ukraine)	MF	14 June 1997 (aged 21)
29	Vitaliy Buyalskyi	(Ukraine)	MF	6 January 1993 (aged 26)
31	Heorhiy Tsitaishvili ^{List B}	(Ukraine)	MF	18 November 2000 (aged 18)
45	Yevhen Smyrnyi ^{List B}	(Ukraine)	MF	15 August 1998 (aged 20)
99	Mikkel Duelund	(Denmark)	MF	29 June 1997 (aged 21)
Forwards
9	Fran Sol	(Spain)	FW	13 March 1992 (aged 27)
10	Mykola Shaparenko ^{List B}	(Ukraine)	FW	4 October 1998 (aged 20)
27	Yevhen Isayenko ^{List B}	(Ukraine)	FW	7 August 2000 (aged 18)
41	Artem Besyedin	(Ukraine)	FW	31 March 1996 (aged 23)
43	Nazariy Rusyn ^{List B}	(Ukraine)	FW	25 October 1998 (aged 20)
89	Vladyslav Supriaha ^{List B}	(Ukraine)	FW	15 February 2000 (aged 19)

== Transfers ==
=== In ===
Date	Pos.	Player	Age	Moving from	Type	Fee	Source
Summer
8 June 2018	MF	(Brazil) Tchê Tchê	25	(Brazil) Palmeiras	Transfer	Undisclosed	
10 June 2018	DF	(Brazil) Sidcley	25	(Brazil) Atlético Paranaense	Transfer	Undisclosed	
18 June 2018	MF	(Ukraine) Dmytro Kopytov	20	(Ukraine) Stal Kamianske	Transfer	Undisclosed	
29 June 2018	GK	(Ukraine) Denys Boyko	30	(Turkey) Beşiktaş	Transfer	Free	
31 July 2018	FW	(Ukraine) Artem Khotsyanovskyi	19	(Ukraine) Stal Kamianske	Transfer	Undisclosed	
10 August 2018	FW	(Ukraine) Vladyslav Supriaha	18	(Ukraine) SC Dnipro-1	Transfer	Undisclosed	
31 August 2018	MF	(Denmark) Mikkel Duelund	21	(Denmark) Midtjylland	Transfer	Undisclosed	
31 May 2018	DF	(Portugal) Vitorino Antunes	31	(Spain) Getafe	Loan return		
31 May 2018	DF	(Ukraine) Pavlo Lukyanchuk	22	(Ukraine) Veres Rivne	Loan return		
31 May 2018	DF	(Ukraine) Zurab Ochigava	23	(Ukraine) Olimpik Donetsk	Loan return		
31 May 2018	DF	(Ukraine) Oleksandr Osman	22	(Ukraine) Arsenal Kyiv	Loan return		
31 May 2018	MF	(Ukraine) Oleksandr Andriyevskyi	23	(Ukraine) Zorya Luhansk	Loan return		
31 May 2018	MF	(Ukraine) Pavlo Orikhovskyi	22	(Ukraine) Chornomorets Odesa	Loan return		
31 May 2018	MF	(Ukraine) Serhiy Rybalka	28	(Turkey) Sivasspor	Loan return		
30 June 2018	GK	(Ukraine) Maksym Koval	25	(Spain) Deportivo La Coruña	Loan return		
2 August 2018	MF	(Brazil) Vitor Bueno	23	(Brazil) Santos	Loan		
Winter
16 January 2019	FW	(Spain) Fran Sol	26	(Netherlands) Willem II	Transfer	Undisclosed	
10 April 2019	MF	(Uruguay) Carlos de Pena	27	(Uruguay) Nacional	Transfer	Free	
1 January 2019	DF	(Georgia (country)) Luka Lochoshvili	20	(Georgia (country)) Dinamo Tbilisi	Loan return		
1 January 2019	MF	(Belarus) Nikita Korzun	23	(Belarus) Dinamo Minsk	Loan return		

=== Out ===
Date	Pos.	Player	Age	Moving to	Type	Fee	Source
Summer
31 May 2018	DF	(Ukraine) Yevhen Khacheridi	30	(Greece) PAOK	Transfer	Free	
31 May 2018	MF	(Ukraine) Oleh Husyev	35	Retired	Transfer	Free	
31 May 2018	FW	(Ukraine) Ruslan Rotan	36	Retired	Transfer	Free	
11 June 2018	DF	(Portugal) Vitorino Antunes	31	(Spain) Getafe	Transfer	Undisclosed	
18 June 2018	FW	(Brazil) Júnior Moraes	31	(Ukraine) Shakhtar Donetsk	Transfer	Free	
11 July 2018	FW	(Ukraine) Dmytro Khlyobas	24	(Ukraine) Desna Chernihiv	Transfer	Free	
19 July 2018	DF	(Ukraine) Maksym Kazakov	20	(Ukraine) Zorya Luhansk	Transfer	Undisclosed	
20 July 2018	MF	(Ukraine) Serhiy Rybalka	28	(Turkey) Sivasspor	Transfer	Undisclosed	
25 August 2018	FW	(Democratic Republic of the Congo) Dieumerci Mbokani	32	(Belgium) Royal Antwerp	Transfer	Free	
31 May 2018	GK	(Ukraine) Denys Boyko	30	(Turkey) Beşiktaş	Loan return		
1 July 2018	MF	(Ukraine) Ivan Kaliuzhnyi	20	(Ukraine) Metalist 1925 Kharkiv	Loan		
2 July 2018	DF	(Ukraine) Pavlo Lukyanchuk	22	(Hungary) Kisvárda	Loan		
19 July 2018	DF	(Ukraine) Vladyslav Dubinchak	20	(Ukraine) Arsenal Kyiv	Loan		
19 July 2018	MF	(Ukraine) Bohdan Lyednyev	20	(Ukraine) Zorya Luhansk	Loan		
19 July 2018	MF	(Ukraine) Bohdan Mykhaylychenko	21	(Ukraine) Zorya Luhansk	Loan		
23 July 2018	GK	(Ukraine) Maksym Koval	25	(Saudi Arabia) Al-Fateh	Loan		
24 July 2018	MF	(Belarus) Nikita Korzun	23	(Belarus) Dinamo Minsk	Loan		
31 July 2018	MF	(Paraguay) Derlis González	24	(Brazil) Santos	Loan		
3 August 2018	DF	(Ukraine) Pavlo Orikhovskyi	22	(Ukraine) Arsenal Kyiv	Loan		
3 August 2018	DF	(Ukraine) Denys Yanakov	19	(Ukraine) Arsenal Kyiv	Loan		
3 August 2018	FW	(Ukraine) Vladyslav Alekseyev	20	(Ukraine) Arsenal Kyiv	Loan		
18 August 2018	DF	(Peru) Carlos Zambrano	29	(Switzerland) Basel	Loan		
Winter
1 March 2019	MF	(Ukraine) Vladyslav Kalitvintsev	26	(Ukraine) Arsenal Kyiv	Transfer	Free	
1 April 2019	MF	(Brazil) Tchê Tchê	26	(Brazil) São Paulo	Transfer	Undisclosed	
10 January 2019	MF	(Ukraine) Mykola Morozyuk	30	(Turkey) Çaykur Rizespor	Loan		
14 January 2019	DF	(Ukraine) Zurab Ochigava	23	(Ukraine) SC Dnipro-1	Loan		
24 January 2019	MF	(Belarus) Nikita Korzun	23	(Saudi Arabia) Al-Fateh	Loan		
30 January 2019	DF	(Serbia) Aleksandar Pantić	26	(Spain) Cádiz	Loan		
7 February 2019	DF	(Georgia (country)) Luka Lochoshvili	20	(Slovakia) MŠK Žilina	Loan		
2 April 2019	MF	(Brazil) Vitor Bueno	24	(Brazil) Santos	Loan return		

== Pre-season and friendlies ==
27 June 2018 Friendly	Dynamo Kyiv (Ukraine)	2–1	(Ukraine) Kolos Kovalivka	Kyiv
11:15 EEST (UTC+03:00)	Khlyobas 64'; Tchê Tchê 75'	Report	Solomka 25'	Stadium: Dynamo Training Center; Attendance: 200

4 July 2018 Friendly	Dynamo Kyiv (Ukraine)	1–0	(Azerbaijan) Qarabağ	Jenbach, Austria
19:00 EEST (UTC+03:00)	Tsyhankov 14'	Report

5 July 2018 Friendly	Dynamo Kyiv (Ukraine)	3–3	(China) Tianjin Quanjian	Jenbach, Austria
17:00 EEST (UTC+03:00)	Buyalskyi 38'; Rusyn 44'; Verbič 86'	Report	Pei Shuai 24'; Modeste 55'; Pato 59'

8 July 2018 Friendly	Dynamo Kyiv (Ukraine)	1–1	(Switzerland) Luzern	Oberperfuss, Austria
15:30 EEST (UTC+03:00)	Besyedin 68'	Report	Grether 59'

9 July 2018 Friendly	Dynamo Kyiv (Ukraine)	1–0	(Romania) Botoșani	Schwaz, Austria
18:00 EEST (UTC+03:00)	Lyednyev 4'	Report

13 July 2018 Friendly	Dynamo Kyiv (Ukraine)	9–0	(Austria) SV Telfs	Kematen in Tirol, Austria
18:30 EEST (UTC+03:00)	Shaparenko 24'; Rusyn 26'; Andriyevskyi 43', 58'; Smyrnyi 69'; Dehtyarev 72'; Buyalskyi 78', 90' (pen.); Alibekov 88'	Report

14 July 2018 Friendly	Dynamo Kyiv (Ukraine)	2–0	(Czech Republic) Viktoria Plzeň	Schwaz, Austria
16:30 EEST (UTC+03:00)	Buyalskyi 62'; Smyrnyi 89'	Report

13 October 2018 Friendly	Dynamo Kyiv (Ukraine)	0–1	(Ukraine) Arsenal Kyiv	Kyiv
12:00 EEST (UTC+03:00)		Report	Akulinin 36'	Stadium: Dynamo Training Center; Attendance: 80

18 November 2018 Friendly	Dynamo Kyiv (Ukraine)	3–0	(Ukraine) Olimpik Donetsk	Kyiv
13:00 EET (UTC+02:00)	Bueno 27'; Khotsyanovskyi 83'; Harmash 90'	Report		Stadium: Dynamo Training Center; Attendance: 50; Referee: Volodymyr Novokhatniy

19 January 2019 Friendly	Dynamo Kyiv (Ukraine)	3–0	(Germany) Bochum	Marbella, Spain
17:00 EET (UTC+02:00)	Tsyhankov 29'; Rusyn 69', 78'	Report		Stadium: Municipal stadium

23 January 2019 Friendly	Dynamo Kyiv (Ukraine)	1–1	(Romania) FCSB	Marbella, Spain
EET (UTC+02:00)	Sidcley 90'	Report	Hora 94'	Stadium: Football Center; Referee: Raul Garcia

26 January 2019 Friendly	Dynamo Kyiv (Ukraine)	2–3	(Czech Republic) Sparta Prague	Marbella, Spain
13:00 EET (UTC+02:00)	Tsyhankov 47'; Alibekov 64'	Report	Tetteh 17'; Stanciu 46'; Hložek 81'	Stadium: Football Center

2 February 2019 Friendly	Dynamo Kyiv (Ukraine)	3–0	(Bulgaria) CSKA Sofia	Marbella, Spain
17:00 EET (UTC+02:00)	Tsyhankov 3'; Verbič 35'; Andriyevskyi 89'	Report		Stadium: Football Center

5 February 2019 Friendly	Dynamo Kyiv (Ukraine)	0–0	(Sweden) Östersund	Marbella, Spain
13:30 EET (UTC+02:00)		Report		Stadium: Football Center

6 February 2019 Friendly	Dynamo Kyiv (Ukraine)	1–3	(United States) New England Revolution	Marbella, Spain
EET (UTC+02:00)	Rusyn 33'	Report	Agudelo 54'; Gil 68'; Fagúndez 87'	Stadium: Football Center

8 February 2019 Friendly	Dynamo Kyiv (Ukraine)	0–0	(Sweden) Malmö	Marbella, Spain
15:00 EET (UTC+02:00)		Report		Stadium: Football Center; Referee: Ola Hobber Nilsen

9 February 2019 Friendly	Dynamo Kyiv (Ukraine)	2–1	(Norway) Vålerenga	Marbella, Spain
14:00 EET (UTC+02:00)	Rusyn 6'; Kravchenko 39'	Report	Grødem 69'	Stadium: Municipal stadium Referee: Sergio Gutierrez Perez

25 March 2019 Friendly	Dynamo Kyiv (Ukraine)	1–1	(Ukraine) Polissya Zhytomyr	Kyiv
15:00 EET (UTC+02:00)	43'	Report	Lohinov 75'	Stadium: Dynamo Training Center

19 April 2019 Friendly	Dynamo Kyiv (Ukraine)	5–0	(Ukraine) Vorskla Poltava	Kyiv
14:00 EEST (UTC+03:00)	Mykolenko 9'; Tsitaishvili 27'; Andriyevskyi 31' de Pena 35'; Tsyhankov 64' (pen.)	Report		Stadium: Dynamo Stadium

== Competitions ==
=== Overall ===
Competition	First match	Last match	Starting round	Final position	Record							
Competition	First match	Last match	Starting round	Final position	Pld	W	D	L	GF	GA	GD	Win %
Ukrainian Premier League	25 July 2018	30 May 2019	Matchday 1	2nd	32	22	6	4	54	18	+36	68.75
Ukrainian Cup	31 October 2018	7 April 2019	Round of 16 (1/8)	Quarterfinal	2	1	1	0	4	2	+2	50.00
Ukrainian Super Cup	21 July 2018	21 July 2018	Final	Winners	1	1	0	0	1	0	+1	100.00
UEFA Champions League	7 August 2018	28 August 2018	Third qualifying round	Play off	4	1	2	1	4	4	+0	25.00
UEFA Europa League	20 September 2018	14 March 2019	Group stage	Round of 16	10	4	3	3	13	17	−4	40.00
Total					49	29	12	8	76	41	+35	59.18

Last updated: 31 May 2019
Source: Competitions

=== Ukrainian Premier League ===
==== League table ====
Pos	Team	Pld	W	D	L	GF	GA	GD	Pts	Qualification or relegation
1	Shakhtar Donetsk (C)	32	26	5	1	73	11	+62	83	Qualification for the Champions League group stage
2	Dynamo Kyiv	32	22	6	4	54	18	+36	72	Qualification for the Champions League third qualifying round
3	FC Oleksandriya	32	14	7	11	39	34	+5	49	Qualification for the Europa League group stage (Note: Since the winners of the 2018–19 Ukrainian Cup, Shakhtar Donetsk, qualified for European competition based on league position, the spot awarded to the cup winners (Europa League group stage) was passed to the third-placed team, the spot awarded to the third-placed team (Europa League third qualifying round) was passed to the fourth-placed team, and the spot awarded to the fourth-placed team (Europa League second qualifying round) was passed to the fifth-placed team.)
4	FC Mariupol	32	12	7	13	36	47	−11	43 (Note: Head to Head: Mariupol – Zorya +3=0-1, advantage Mariupol.)	Qualification for the Europa League third qualifying round
5	Zorya Luhansk	32	11	10	11	39	34	+5	43	Qualification for the Europa League second qualifying round

Source: Ukrainian Premier League (in Ukrainian), UEFA, Soccerway
Rules for classification: 1) Points; 2) Head-to-head points; 3) Head-to-head goal difference; 4) Head-to-head higher number of goals scored; 5) Goal difference; 6) Higher number of goals scored; 7) Draw or "golden match" if tied for title (Article 22, paragraph 3).
(C) Champions
Notes:

Teams that placed 10th and 11th in the 2018–19 Ukrainian Premier League play two-leg play-off with the second and third teams of the 2018–19 Ukrainian First League. The draw for play-offs took place on 24 May 2019 and the games will be played on 4 and 8 June 2019.

Team 1	Agg.	Team 2	1st leg	2nd leg
Chornomorets Odesa	0 – 2	Kolos Kovalivka	0 – 0	0 – 2
Karpaty Lviv	3 – 1	Volyn Lutsk	0 – 0	3 – 1

=== First leg ===
4 June 2019
19:00 UTC+3

Chornomorets Odesa	0 – 0	Kolos Kovalivka
	Report

Chornomorets Stadium, Odesa
Attendance: 5,435
Referee: Anatoliy Abdula (Kharkiv)

4 June 2019
19:00 UTC+3

Karpaty Lviv	0 – 0	Volyn Lutsk
	Report

Ukraina Stadium, Lviv
Attendance: 10,104
Referee: Denys Shurman (Vyshneve)

=== Second leg ===
8 June 2019
17:00 UTC+3

Kolos Kovalivka	2 – 0	Chornomorets Odesa
Havrysh 57', 63' (pen.)	Report

Kolos Stadium, Kovalivka
Attendance: 2,500
Referee: Vitaliy Romanov

Kolos Kovalivka won 2–0 on aggregate and were promoted to the 2019–20 Ukrainian Premier League. Chornomorets Odesa were relegated to the 2019–20 Ukrainian First League

8 June 2019
19:00 UTC+3

Volyn Lutsk	0 – 3 ~~1 – 3~~	Karpaty Lviv
Kozhanov 42'	Report	Klyots 37'; Ponde 82' (pen.); Miroshnichenko 90+5'

Avanhard Stadium, Lutsk
Attendance: 5,200
Referee: Maksym Kozyryatskyi

Karpaty Lviv won 3–0 on aggregate and retained their spot in the 2019–20 Ukrainian Premier League. Volyn Lutsk remained in the 2019–20 Ukrainian First League

Due to fan violence at the game and attack on referee, the original score 1–3 was scratched and replaced with technical score 0–3 loss to Volyn and win for Karpaty. Additionally, the Lutsk department of police started criminal proceedings on the fact of intentional damage to property during the game by the Karpaty fans.

==== Results summary ====
Overall								Home						Away					
Pld	W	D	L	GF	GA	GD	Pts	W	D	L	GF	GA	GD	W	D	L	GF	GA	GD
32	22	6	4	54	18	+36	72	11	3	2	29	7	+22	11	3	2	25	11	+14

Last updated: 31 May 2019.
Source: Competitive matches

==== Results by round ====
Round	1	2	3	4	5	6	7	8	9	10	11	12	13	14	15	16	17	18	19	20	21	22	23	24	25	26	27	28	29	30	31	32
Ground	H	A	H	A	H	A	H	A	H	A	H	A	H	A	H	A	H	A	H	A	H	A	A	A	H	A	H	H	H	A	H	A
Result	W	W	W	W	W	D	L	D	W	W	W	W	L	L	W	L	W	W	W	W	W	W	W	W	D	W	D	D	W	D	W	W
Position	6	3	2	2	1	3	3	3	2	2	2	2	2	2	2	3	3	2	2	2	2	2	2	2	2	2	2	2	2	2	2	2

Updated to match(es) played on 31 May 2019. Source: Competitive matches
A = Away; H = Home; W = Win; D = Draw; L = Loss

==== Matches ====
25 July 2018 1	Dynamo Kyiv	1–0	Vorskla Poltava	Kyiv
19:00 EEST (UTC+03:00)	Dallku 33' (o.g.); Morozyuk (yellow card) 39'	Report	Chyzhov (yellow card) 37'; Kravchenko (yellow card) 46'; Kobakhidze (yellow card) 49'; Kulach (yellow card) 10'; Chesnakov (yellow card) 82'; Mysyk (yellow card) 84'	Stadium: NSC Olimpiyskiy; Attendance: 0 Referee: Viktor Kopiyevskyi

28 July 2018 2	FC Lviv	0–1	Dynamo Kyiv	Lviv
19:30 EEST (UTC+03:00)	Augusto (yellow card) 77'	Report	Besyedin (yellow card) 86'; Rusyn 90+2'	Stadium: Arena Lviv; Attendance: 10,150; Referee: Yaroslav Kozyk

3 August 2018 3	Dynamo Kyiv	1–0	Shakhtar Donetsk	Kyiv
19:00 EEST (UTC+03:00)	Buyalskyi (yellow card) 57'; Verbič 65'	Report	Khocholava (yellow card) 30'; Ismaily (yellow card) 51'; Stepanenko (yellow card) 55'	Stadium: NSC Olimpiyskiy; Attendance: 46,475; Referee: Yuriy Mozharovskyi

18 August 2018 5	Dynamo Kyiv	1–0	FC Oleksandriya	Kyiv
19:30 EEST (UTC+03:00)	Morozyuk (yellow card) 42'; Tsyhankov 68'; Pivarić (yellow card) 86'	Report	Bondarenko (yellow card) 15'; Dovhyi (yellow card) 62'	Stadium: NSC Olimpiyskiy; Attendance: 11,635; Referee: Vitaliy Romanov

25 August 2018 6	Chornomorets Odesa	1–1	Dynamo Kyiv	Odesa
19:30 EEST (UTC+03:00)	Babenko (yellow card) 75'; Hrachov 84'; Litovchenko (yellow card) 90+3'; Smirnov (yellow card) 90+3'	Report	Rusyn 59'	Stadium: Chornomorets Stadium; Attendance: 13,272; Referee: Anatoliy Abdula

2 September 2018 7	Dynamo Kyiv	0–2	Karpaty Lviv	Kyiv
19:30 EEST (UTC+03:00)	Burda (yellow card) 75'; Kalitvintsev (yellow card) 86'	Report	Shved 17', 45+1'; Mehremić (yellow card) 26' (yellow-red card) 55'; Carrascal (yellow card) 75'; Hutsulyak (yellow card) 81'; Verbnyi (yellow card) 81'; Kuchynskyi (yellow card) 88'	Stadium: NSC Olimpiyskiy; Attendance: 10,700; Referee: Oleksandr Derdo

16 September 2018 8	Zorya Luhansk	1–1	Dynamo Kyiv	Zaporizhia
17:00 EEST (UTC+03:00)	Kabayev (yellow card) 41' (yellow-red card) 90+3'; Hromov 44'; Silas (yellow card) 69'; Kharatin (yellow card) 89'	Report	Buyalskyi (yellow card) 30'; Shepelyev (yellow card) 46'; Sydorchuk 67'; Tsyhankov (yellow card) 90+2'	Stadium: Slavutych-Arena; Attendance: 9,237; Referee: Viktor Kopiyevskyi

23 September 2018 9	Dynamo Kyiv	4–0	Desna Chernihiv	Kyiv
17:00 EEST (UTC+03:00)	Harmash (yellow card) 21'; Burda 45'; Verbič 67'; Kędziora 74'; Tsyhankov 87'	Report	Bratkov (yellow card) 7'	Stadium: NSC Olimpiyskiy; Attendance: 10,318; Referee: Kateryna Monzul

26 September 2018 4	FC Mariupol	0–2	Dynamo Kyiv	Mariupol
17:00 EEST (UTC+03:00)	Yavorskyi (yellow card) 24'; Bykov (yellow card) 65'	Report	Verbič 7'; Tsyhankov 25' (pen.); Kędziora (yellow card) 52'	Stadium: Volodymyr Boiko Stadium; Attendance: 5,106; Referee: Ihor Paskhal

30 September 2018 10	Arsenal Kyiv	0–1	Dynamo Kyiv	Kyiv
19:30 EEST (UTC+03:00)	Dombrovskyi (yellow card) 18'; Sahutkin (yellow card) 64'; Karas (yellow card) 64'; Jevtoski (yellow card) 88'; Semenyuk (yellow card) 90+8'	Report	Burda (yellow card) 33'; Duelund 35'; Bushchan (red card) 52'; Shabanov (red card) 75'; Morozyuk (yellow card) 88'; Besyedin (yellow card) 90+4'	Stadium: Dynamo Stadium; Attendance: 6,360; Referee: Mykola Balakin

7 October 2018 11	Dynamo Kyiv	1–0	Olimpik Donetsk	Kyiv
17:00 EEST (UTC+03:00)	Morozyuk 30'; Burda (yellow card) 53'	Report	Do Couto (yellow card) 59'; Nyemchaninov (yellow card) 69'; Kravchenko (yellow card) 84'	Stadium: NSC Olimpiyskiy; Attendance: 9,650; Referee: Yaroslav Kozyk

20 October 2018 12	Vorskla Poltava	0–1	Dynamo Kyiv	Poltava
17:00 EEST (UTC+03:00)		Report	Buyalskyi (yellow card) 29'; Tsyhankov 40'; Kádár (yellow card) 59'; Harmash (yellow card) 83'	Stadium: Vorskla Stadium; Attendance: 6,700; Referee: Anatoliy Abdula

28 October 2018 13	Dynamo Kyiv	0–1	FC Lviv	Kyiv
17:00 EET (UTC+02:00)	Tchê Tchê (yellow card) 66'	Report	Lucas Taylor 21', (yellow card) 58'; Putrash (yellow card) 24'; Sabino (yellow card) 38' (yellow-red card) 90+3'; Pryimak (yellow card) 43'; Paramonov (yellow card) 53'; Jonatan Lima (yellow card) 83'; Marthã (yellow card) 89'; Yanchak (yellow card) 90+2'	Stadium: NSC Olimpiyskiy; Attendance: 9,614; Referee: Maksym Kozyryanskyi

3 November 2018 14	Shakhtar Donetsk	2–1	Dynamo Kyiv	Kharkiv
17:00 EET (UTC+02:00)	Stepanenko (yellow card) 26'; Rakitskiy (yellow card) 45+1'; Moraes 54', (yellow card) 60'; Kryvtsov (yellow card) 90+2'; Kovalenko 90+5', (yellow card) 90+5'	Report	Shaparenko 44'; Mykolenko (yellow card) 64'; Kędziora (yellow card) 78' (yellow-red card) 90+2'; Verbič (yellow card) 90+2'	Stadium: OSC Metalist; Attendance: 17,125; Referee: Vitaliy Romanov

11 November 2018 15	Dynamo Kyiv	4–0	FC Mariupol	Kyiv
17:00 EET (UTC+02:00)	Shaparenko 33'; Verbič 57'; Chobotenko 62' (o.g.); Morozyuk (yellow card) 67'; Tsyhankov 85' (pen.); Kádár (yellow card) 87'	Report	Tyschenko (yellow card) 21'; Fedorchuk (yellow card) 24'; Boryachuk (yellow card) 35'; Bykov (yellow card) 84'	Stadium: NSC Olimpiyskiy; Attendance: 7,162; Referee: Dmytro Kryvushkin

25 November 2018 16	FC Oleksandriya	2–1	Dynamo Kyiv	Oleksandriya
19:30 EET (UTC+02:00)	Tsurikov 3'; Zaderaka (yellow card) 31'; Zaporozhan 57' (pen.), (yellow card) 90+1'; Sitalo (yellow card) 59'; Kovalets (yellow card) 68'	Report	Shaparenko (yellow card) 4'; Shepelyev (yellow card) 21'; Verbič 33'; Kędziora (yellow card) 39'; Sydorchuk (yellow card) 54'; Boyko (yellow card) 56'; Kádár (yellow card) 69'	Stadium: CSC Nika Stadium; Attendance: 2,478; Referee: Ihor Paskhal

3 December 2018 17	Dynamo Kyiv	2–0	Chornomorets Odesa	Kyiv
18:30 EET (UTC+02:00)	Tsyhankov 21' (pen.), (yellow card) 88'; Besyedin 61' (pen.), (yellow card) 72'; Sydorchuk (yellow card) 79'; Shabanov (yellow card) 81'; Verbič (yellow card) 88'	Report	Norenkov (yellow card) 52'; Hrachov (yellow card) 60'; Semeniv (yellow card) 71'; Musolitin (yellow card) 79'; Koval (yellow card) 82'	Stadium: NSC Olimpiyskiy; Attendance: 3,870; Referee: Yuriy Ivanov

8 December 2018 18	Karpaty Lviv	0–4	Dynamo Kyiv	Lviv
14:00 EET (UTC+02:00)	Erbes (yellow card) 3'; Mehremić (yellow card) 26'; Gueye (yellow card) 54'; Hutsulyak (yellow card) 56'; Di Franco (yellow card) 75'	Report	Besyedin (yellow card) 15'; Tsyhankov 28', 89', 90+1'; Shaparenko (yellow card) 30', (goal) 89'; Shepelyev (yellow card) 37'; Verbič (yellow card) 60'	Stadium: Ukraina Stadium; Attendance: 2,756; Referee: Oleksandr Omelchenko

25 February 2019 19	Dynamo Kyiv	5–0	Zorya Luhansk	Kyiv
18:30 EET (UTC+02:00)	Shaparenko 34', 49', (yellow card) 39'; Verbič 37', 54', (yellow card) 82'; Fran Sol 73'; Sydorchuk (yellow card) 82'; Shabanov (yellow card) 90+3'	Report	Lunyov (yellow card) 31'; Kabayev (yellow card) 78'; Lytvyn (yellow card) 90'	Stadium: NSC Olimpiyskiy; Attendance: 12,764; Referee: Vitaliy Romanov

2 March 2019 20	Desna Chernihiv	1–2	Dynamo Kyiv	Chernihiv
14:00 EET (UTC+02:00)	Artem Favorov (yellow card) 22'; Bezborodko (yellow card) 40'; Partsvania (yellow card) 70'; Serhiychuk (yellow card) 79'; Kartushov 83'	Report	Kędziora 25'; Buyalskyi 68'; Rusyn (yellow card) 90+1'	Stadium: Chernihiv Stadium; Attendance: 5,500; Referee: Yaroslav Kozyk

10 March 2019 21	Dynamo Kyiv	4–0	Arsenal Kyiv	Kyiv
17:00 EET (UTC+02:00)	Harmash (yellow card) 20', (goal) 28', 39'; Sidcley 37'; Tsyhankov 45' (pen.); Mykolenko (yellow card) 82'	Report	Avahimyan (yellow card) 58'; Stryzhak (yellow card) 81'; Sahutkin (yellow card) 83'; Zhychykov (yellow card) 83'	Stadium: NSC Olimpiyskiy; Attendance: 7,686; Referee: Yevhen Aranovskyi

17 March 2019 22	Olimpik Donetsk	1–2	Dynamo Kyiv	Kyiv
19:30 EET (UTC+02:00)	Gai 27' (pen.); Dieye (yellow card) 59'	Report	Tsyhankov 14' (pen.); Rusyn (yellow card) 28', (goal) 39'; Burda (yellow card) 44'; Kádár (yellow card) 58'	Stadium: Dynamo Stadium; Attendance: 2,500; Referee: Ihor Paskhal

3 April 2019 23	Zorya Luhansk	2–3	Dynamo Kyiv	Zaporizhia
18:30 EEST (UTC+03:00)	Karavayev 32'; Silas (yellow card) 43'; Budkivskyi (yellow card) 46'; Bilyi 54', (yellow card) 62', (red card) 69'; Lunyov (yellow card) 56'; Kabayev (yellow card) 60'; Checher (yellow card) 81'	Report	Shaparenko (yellow card) 38'; Kádár (yellow card) 48' (yellow-red card) 53'; Kędziora (yellow card) 56'; Buyalskyi 58', (yellow card) 84'; Tsyhankov 64', 82' (pen.); Verbič (yellow card) 90+1'	Stadium: Slavutych-Arena; Attendance: 7,238; Referee: Viktor Kopiyevskyi

13 April 2019 24	FC Mariupol	0–1	Dynamo Kyiv	Mariupol
14:00 EEST (UTC+03:00)	Ihnatenko (yellow card) 16'; Demiri (yellow card) 25'	Report	Andriyevskyi (yellow card) 45+1'; Shepelyev (yellow card) 72'; Tsyhankov 73'; Burda (yellow card) 87'; Popov (yellow card) 87'	Stadium: Volodymyr Boiko Stadium; Attendance: 8,069; Referee: Yuriy Mozharovskyi

24 April 2019 25	Dynamo Kyiv	0–0	Shakhtar Donetsk	Kyiv
18:30 EEST (UTC+03:00)	Buyalskyi (yellow card) 31'; Burda (yellow card) 57'; Mykolenko (yellow card) 59' de Pena (yellow card) 62'; Tsitaishvili (yellow card) 79'	Report	Moraes (yellow card) 57'; Bolbat (yellow card) 63'; Taison (yellow card) 78'; Dentinho (yellow card) 87'	Stadium: NSC Olimpiyskiy; Attendance: 41,383; Referee: Vitaliy Romanov

28 April 2019 26	FC Lviv	0–1	Dynamo Kyiv	Lviv
19:30 EEST (UTC+03:00)	Marthã (yellow card) 26'; Sabino (yellow card) 48'; Cadina (yellow card) 70'; Pedro Vitor (yellow card) 76'; Pernambuco (yellow card) 90+1'	Report	Rusyn (yellow card) 7'; Burda (red card) 19'; Buyalskyi 24'; Shabanov (yellow card) 51'; Shepelyev (yellow card) 60'; Tsyhankov (yellow card) 73'; Kędziora (red card) 76'; Andriyevskyi (yellow card) 85'	Stadium: Ukraina Stadium; Attendance: 1,480; Referee: Ihor Paskhal

4 May 2019 27	Dynamo Kyiv	1–1	FC Oleksandriya	Kyiv
17:00 EEST (UTC+03:00)	Kravchenko (yellow card) 45'; Rusyn 65'	Report	Luchkevych 8'; Babohlo (yellow card) 36'; Hrechyshkin (yellow card) 89'	Stadium: NSC Olimpiyskiy; Attendance: 14,671; Referee: Maksym Kozyruatskyi

11 May 2019 28	Dynamo Kyiv	1–1	Zorya Luhansk	Kyiv
17:00 EEST (UTC+03:00)	Rusyn 11'; Buyalskyi (yellow card) 54'; Andriyevskyi (yellow card) 80'; Mykolenko (yellow card) 90+3'	Report	Chaykovskyi (yellow card) 42'; Kocherhin (yellow card) 46'; Cheberko (yellow card) 79'; Silas 90+2'	Stadium: NSC Olimpiyskiy; Attendance: 18,257; Referee: Kateryna Monzul

18 May 2019 29	Dynamo Kyiv	2–1	FC Mariupol	Kyiv
17:00 EEST (UTC+03:00)	de Pena 32'; Rusyn (yellow card) 73'; Tsyhankov 87'	Report	Ihnatenko (yellow card) 28'; Bykov (yellow card) 37'; Fedorchuk 90+2'	Stadium: NSC Olimpiyskiy; Attendance: 12,142; Referee: Dmytro Kryvushkin

22 May 2019 30	Shakhtar Donetsk	1–1	Dynamo Kyiv	Kharkiv
19:30 EEST (UTC+03:00)	Khocholava (yellow card) 20' (yellow-red card) 63'; Alan Patrick (yellow card) 33'; Fernando (yellow card) 35'; Tetê 50', (yellow card) 55'; Dentinho (yellow card) 77'	Report	Tsyhankov (yellow card) 22', (goal) 36' (pen.); Shepelyev (yellow card) 32'; Shabanov (yellow card) 41' (yellow-red card) 45'; Andriyevskyi (yellow card) 83'; Shaparenko (yellow card) 85'; Sidcley (yellow card) 88'	Stadium: OSC Metalist; Attendance: 30,315; Referee: Yaroslav Kozyk

26 May 2019 31	Dynamo Kyiv	2–1	FC Lviv	Kyiv
17:00 EEST (UTC+03:00)	Shaparenko (yellow card) 60'; Besyedin 78'; Burda 84'; Sydorchuk (yellow card) 86'	Report	Alvaro 16'; Borzenko (yellow card) 35'; Lipe Veloso (yellow card) 90+2'	Stadium: NSC Olimpiyskiy; Attendance: 11,470; Referee: Yuriy Ivanov

30 May 2019 32	FC Oleksandriya	0–2	Dynamo Kyiv	Oleksandriya
19:30 EEST (UTC+03:00)	Bukhal (yellow card) 20'; Babohlo (yellow card) 26'; Ponomar (yellow card) 85'	Report	Tsyhankov 21', 69'; Alibekov (yellow card) 24' (yellow-red card) 32'	Stadium: CSC Nika Stadium; Attendance: 3,517; Referee: Yuriy Mozharovskyi

=== Ukrainian Cup ===
31 October 2018 Round of 16 (1/8)	FC Mynai	1–3	Dynamo Kyiv	Mynai
14:00 EET (UTC+02:00)	Hehedosh 21', (yellow card) 32'; Havrylenko (yellow card) 38'; Mykulyak (yellow card) 42'; Betsa (yellow card) 55'; Pynyashko (yellow card) 82'; Loboda (yellow card) 90+1'	Report	Andriyevskyi (yellow card) 31'; Shaparenko 50', 54'; Harmash 58'	Stadium: Mynai Arena; Attendance: 2,630; Referee: Yuriy Ivanov

7 April 2018 Quarterfinal	Shakhtar Donetsk	1–1 (4 – 3 p)	Dynamo Kyiv	Kharkiv
17:00 EET (UTC+02:00)	Taison (yellow card) 19'; Stepanenko (yellow card) 39'; Alan Patrick (yellow card) 43'; Moraes 57', (yellow card) 62' (yellow-red card) 67'; Solomon (yellow card) 90'; Maycon (yellow card) 104'; Bolbat (yellow card) 116'	Report	Harmash 9', (yellow card) 61' (red card) 62'; Kędziora (yellow card) 23'; Shaparenko (yellow card) 47'; Burda (yellow card) 60'; Shepelyev (yellow card) 77'; Sidcley (yellow card) 86'; Buyalskyi (yellow card) 90'	Stadium: OSC Metalist; Attendance: 29,112; Referee: Maksym Kozyryatskyi
	Penalties
	Ismaily (penalty scored); Solomon (penalty missed); Maycon (penalty scored); Nem (penalty scored); Kovalenko (penalty scored)		Tsyhankov (penalty scored); Sidcley (penalty scored); Kędziora (penalty scored); Mykolenko (penalty missed); Shepelyev (penalty missed)

=== Ukrainian Super Cup ===
21 July 2018 Final	Shakhtar Donetsk	0–1	Dynamo Kyiv	Odesa
21:00 EEST (UTC+03:00)	Danchenko (yellow card) 53'; Fernando (yellow card) 60'; Moraes (yellow card) 90+3'; Totovytskyi (yellow card) 90+5'; Ismaily (red card) 90+5'	Report	Burda (yellow card) 13' (yellow-red card) 90+5'; Buyalskyi 18'; Shepelyev (yellow card) 71'; Kádár (yellow card) 81'; Kędziora (yellow card) 90+5'; Boyko (yellow card) 90+7'	Stadium: Chornomorets Stadium; Attendance: 27,400; Referee: Kostiantyn Trukhanov

=== UEFA Champions League ===
==== Third qualifying round ====
7 August 2018 First leg	Slavia Prague (Czech Republic)	1–1	(Ukraine) Dynamo Kyiv	Prague, Czech Republic
20:30 EEST (UTC+03:00)	Hušbauer (yellow card) 86', (goal) 90+5' (pen.); Coufal (yellow card) 86'	Report	Buyalskyi (yellow card) 65'; Verbič 82'; Kędziora (yellow card) 90+4'	Stadium: Eden Arena; Attendance: 19,370; Referee: Craig Pawson (England)

14 August 2018 Second leg	Dynamo Kyiv (Ukraine)	2–0	(Czech Republic) Slavia Prague	Kyiv
19:30 EEST (UTC+03:00)	Verbič 11'; Besyedin 74'	Report	Hušbauer (yellow card) 38'; Kovář (yellow card) 39'; Stoch (yellow card) 45+1'; Bořil (yellow card) 86'; Coufal (yellow card) 89'; Frydrych (yellow card) 90+4'	Stadium: NSC Olimpiyskiy; Attendance: 39,318; Referee: Daniel Stefański (Poland)

==== Play-off round ====
22 August 2018 First leg	Ajax (Netherlands)	3–1	(Ukraine) Dynamo Kyiv	Amsterdam, Netherlands
22:00 EEST (UTC+03:00)	van de Beek 2'; Huntelaar (yellow card) 21'; Ziyech 35'; Tadić 43'; Tagliafico (yellow card) 70'	Report	Kędziora 16', (yellow card) 24'; Harmash (yellow card) 38'	Stadium: Johan Cruyff Arena; Attendance: 52,706; Referee: Clément Turpin (France)

28 August 2018 Second leg	Dynamo Kyiv (Ukraine)	0–0	(Netherlands) Ajax	Kyiv
22:00 EEST (UTC+03:00)	Kędziora (yellow card) 14'; Sydorchuk (yellow card) 54'; Shaparenko (yellow card) 70'	Report	Ziyech (yellow card) 34'; Tadić (yellow card) 87'	Stadium: NSC Olimpiyskiy; Attendance: 40,131; Referee: Damir Skomina (Slovenia)

=== Europa League ===
==== Group stage ====
Pos	Team	Pld	W	D	L	GF	GA	GD	Pts	Qualification	DKV	REN	AST	JAB
1	(Ukraine) Dynamo Kyiv	6	3	2	1	10	7	+3	11	Advance to knockout phase	—	3–1	2–2	0–1
2	(France) Rennes	6	3	0	3	7	8	−1	9	Advance to knockout phase	1–2	—	2–0	2–1
3	(Kazakhstan) Astana	6	2	2	2	7	7	0	8		0–1	2–0	—	2–1
4	(Czech Republic) Jablonec	6	1	2	3	6	8	−2	5		2–2	0–1	1–1	—

Source: UEFA
Rules for classification: Group stage tiebreakers

20 September 2018 1	Dynamo Kyiv (Ukraine)	2–2	(Kazakhstan) Astana	Kyiv
20:00 EEST (UTC+03:00)	Tsyhankov 11'; Burda (yellow card) 42'; Harmash 45+2'; Rusyn (yellow card) 81'	Report	Aničić 21'; Murtazayev 90+5'	Stadium: NSC Olimpiyskiy; Attendance: 21,783; Referee: Halis Özkahya (Turkey)

4 October 2018 2	Jablonec (Czech Republic)	2–2	(Ukraine) Dynamo Kyiv	Jablonec nad Nisou, Czech Republic
22:00 EEST (UTC+03:00)	Holeš (yellow card) 19'; Hovorka 33'; Považanec (yellow card) 58'; Trávník 45+2'	Report	Tsyhankov 8'; Harmash 14'; Morozyuk (yellow card) 53'; Buyalskyi (yellow card) 79'; Pivarić (yellow card) 81'	Stadium: Stadion Střelnice; Attendance: 5,077; Referee: Sébastien Delferière (Belgium)

25 October 2018 3	Rennes (France)	1–2	(Ukraine) Dynamo Kyiv	Rennes, France
22:00 EEST (UTC+03:00)	Grenier 41'; Sarr (yellow card) 53'; Da Silva (yellow card) 70'	Report	Mykolenko (yellow card) 11'; Kędziora 21'; Harmash (yellow card) 25'; Shepelyev (yellow card) 38' (yellow-red card) 85'; Buyalskyi 89', (yellow card) 90+1'; Boyko (yellow card) 90+6'	Stadium: Roazhon Park; Attendance: 28,001; Referee: Tamás Bognár (Hungary)

8 November 2018 4	Dynamo Kyiv (Ukraine)	3–1	(France) Rennes	Kyiv
20:00 EET (UTC+02:00)	Verbič 13'; Mykolenko 69'; Shaparenko 73'	Report	Nyamsi (yellow card) 29'; Traoré (yellow card) 32'; Siliki (yellow card) 55'; Siebatcheu 89'	Stadium: NSC Olimpiyskiy; Attendance: 24,402; Referee: John Beaton (Scotland)

29 November 2018 5	Astana (Kazakhstan)	0–1	(Ukraine) Dynamo Kyiv	Astana, Kazakhstan
17:50 EET (UTC+02:00)	Postnikov (yellow card) 32'; Kleinheisler (yellow card) 87'	Report	Verbič 29'; Tchê Tchê (yellow card) 90'; Harmash (yellow card) 90+3'	Stadium: Astana Arena; Attendance: 26,508; Referee: Ivan Bebek (Croatia)

13 December 2018 6	Dynamo Kyiv (Ukraine)	0–1	(Czech Republic) Jablonec	Kyiv
19:55 EET (UTC+02:00)	Kádár (yellow card) 28'; Verbič (yellow card) 90'	Report	Doležal 10', (yellow card) 13'; Hovorka (yellow card) 88'; Holeš (yellow card) 90+2'	Stadium: NSC Olimpiyskiy; Attendance: 11,300; Referee: Vilhjálmur Thórarinsson (Iceland)

==== Knockout phase ====
===== Round of 32 =====
14 February 2019 First leg	Olympiacos (Greece)	2–2	(Ukraine) Dynamo Kyiv	Piraeus, Greece
18:55 CET (UTC+01:00)	Hassan 9'; Camara (yellow card) 32'; Gil Dias 40'; Podence (yellow card) 58'	Report	Buyalskyi 29'; Verbič (yellow card) 74', (goal) 89'; Kędziora (yellow card) 90+2'	Stadium: Karaiskakis Stadium; Attendance: 31,020; Referee: Craig Pawson (England)

21 February 2019 Second leg	Dynamo Kyiv (Ukraine)	1–0 (3–2 agg.)	(Greece) Olympiacos	Kyiv
21:00 CET (UTC+01:00)	Verbič (yellow card) 22'; Kędziora (yellow card) 24'; Sol 32'; Shepelyev (yellow card) 79'	Report	Cissé (yellow card) 22'; Podence (yellow card) 45'; Guerrero (yellow card) 66'; Torosidis (yellow card) 84'	Stadium: NSC Olimpiyskiy; Attendance: 48,902; Referee: Ivan Kružliak (Slovakia)

===== Round of 16 =====
7 March 2019 First leg	Chelsea (England)	3–0	(Ukraine) Dynamo Kyiv	London, England
21:00 CET (UTC+01:00)	Pedro 17'; Willian 65'; Hudson-Odoi 90'	Report	Shepelyev (yellow card) 9'; Buyalskyi (yellow card) 42'	Stadium: Stamford Bridge; Attendance: 37,280; Referee: Slavko Vinčić (Slovenia)

14 March 2019 Second leg	Dynamo Kyiv (Ukraine)	0–5 (0–8 agg.)	(England) Chelsea	Kyiv
18:55 CET (UTC+01:00)	Mykolenko (yellow card) 61'	Report	Giroud 5', 33', 59'; Alonso 45+1'; Azpilicueta (yellow card) 73'; Hudson-Odoi 78'	Stadium: NSC Olimpiyskiy; Attendance: 64,800; Referee: Tobias Stieler (Germany)

== Statistics ==
=== Appearances and goals ===
No.	Pos	Nat	Player	Total		Premier League		Cup		Super Cup		CL		EL	
No.	Pos	Nat	Player	Apps	Goals	Apps	Goals	Apps	Goals	Apps	Goals	Apps	Goals	Apps	Goals
Goalkeepers
1	GK	(Ukraine) UKR	Heorhiy Bushchan	9	0	7	0	1	0	0	0	0	0	1	0
71	GK	(Ukraine) UKR	Denys Boyko	41	0	25+1	0	1	0	1	0	4	0	9	0
Defenders
16	DF	(Ukraine) UKR	Vitalii Mykolenko	32	1	22+1	0	1	0	0	0	0	0	8	1
23	DF	(Croatia) CRO	Josip Pivarić	12	0	6	0	1	0	0	0	3	0	2	0
26	DF	(Ukraine) UKR	Mykyta Burda	43	2	26	2	2	0	1	0	4	0	10	0
30	DF	(Ukraine) UKR	Artem Shabanov	22	0	15+2	0	1	0	0	0	0+1	0	3	0
44	DF	(Hungary) HUN	Tamás Kádár	35	0	20+2	0	1	0	1	0	4	0	7	0
46	DF	(Ukraine) UKR	Akhmed Alibekov	4	0	2+2	0	0	0	0	0	0	0	0	0
49	DF	(Ukraine) UKR	Denys Popov	1	0	1	0	0	0	0	0	0	0	0	0
94	DF	(Poland) POL	Tomasz Kędziora	43	4	27	2	1	0	1	0	4	1	10	1
Midfielders
5	MF	(Ukraine) UKR	Serhiy Sydorchuk	36	1	15+8	1	0	0	0+1	0	4	0	5+3	0
7	MF	(Slovenia) SLO	Benjamin Verbič	34	12	19+2	7	1	0	1	0	4	2	7	3
8	MF	(Ukraine) UKR	Volodymyr Shepelyev	39	0	24	0	1	0	1	0	2+2	0	7+2	0
14	MF	(Uruguay) URU	Carlos de Pena	8	1	8	1	0	0	0	0	0	0	0	0
15	MF	(Ukraine) UKR	Viktor Tsyhankov	46	20	30+1	18	1	0	1	0	4	0	9	2
17	MF	(Brazil) BRA	Sidcley	23	1	12+5	1	1	0	0	0	0	0	4+1	0
18	MF	(Ukraine) UKR	Oleksandr Andriyevskyi	16	0	8+4	0	1	0	0	0	0+1	0	0+2	0
19	MF	(Ukraine) UKR	Denys Harmash	28	6	7+6	2	1+1	2	0+1	0	3+1	0	4+4	2
21	MF	(Ukraine) UKR	Mykyta Kravchenko	2	0	1+1	0	0	0	0	0	0	0	0	0
29	MF	(Ukraine) UKR	Vitaliy Buyalskyi	36	6	22	3	0+2	0	1	1	3+1	0	7	2
40	MF	(Ukraine) UKR	Heorhiy Tsitaishvili	6	0	1+4	0	0	0	0	0	0	0	0+1	0
45	MF	(Ukraine) UKR	Yevhen Smyrnyi	6	0	1+2	0	1	0	0	0	0	0	0+2	0
99	MF	(Denmark) DEN	Mikkel Duelund	13	1	2+7	1	1	0	0	0	0	0	0+3	0
Forwards
9	FW	(Spain) ESP	Fran Sol	4	2	2	1	0	0	0	0	0	0	2	1
10	FW	(Ukraine) UKR	Mykola Shaparenko	33	8	12+10	5	2	2	0+1	0	0+1	0	7	1
27	FW	(Ukraine) UKR	Yevhen Isayenko	2	0	0+2	0	0	0	0	0	0	0	0	0
41	FW	(Ukraine) UKR	Artem Besyedin	18	3	9+3	2	0	0	1	0	3	1	2	0
43	FW	(Ukraine) UKR	Nazariy Rusyn	24	5	9+10	5	0	0	0	0	0+1	0	2+2	0
89	FW	(Ukraine) UKR	Vladyslav Supriaha	10	0	2+4	0	1	0	0	0	1	0	0+2	0
Players transferred out during the season
6	MF	(Brazil) BRA	Tchê Tchê	16	0	6+3	0	0+1	0	1	0	0+1	0	2+2	0
9	MF	(Ukraine) UKR	Mykola Morozyuk	20	1	11+1	1	1	0	1	0	1+1	0	2+2	0
11	MF	(Ukraine) UKR	Vladyslav Kalitvintsev	1	0	0+1	0	0	0	0	0	0	0	0	0
20	MF	(Brazil) BRA	Vitor Bueno	3	0	0+2	0	1	0	0	0	0	0	0	0

Source: Competitions

Last updated: 31 May 2019

=== Goalscorers ===
Rank	No.	Pos	Nat	Name	Ukrainian Premier League	Ukrainian Cup	Ukrainian Super Cup	UEFA CL	UEFA EL	Total
1	15	MF	(Ukraine)	Viktor Tsyhankov	18	0	0	0	2	20
2	7	MF	(Slovenia)	Benjamin Verbič	7	0	0	2	3	12
3	10	FW	(Ukraine)	Mykola Shaparenko	5	2	0	0	1	8
4	19	MF	(Ukraine)	Denys Harmash	2	2	0	0	2	6
4	29	MF	(Ukraine)	Vitaliy Buyalskyi	3	0	1	0	2	6
6	43	FW	(Ukraine)	Nazariy Rusyn	5	0	0	0	0	5
7	94	DF	(Poland)	Tomasz Kędziora	2	0	0	1	1	4
8	41	FW	(Ukraine)	Artem Besyedin	2	0	0	1	0	3
9	9	FW	(Spain)	Fran Sol	1	0	0	0	1	2
9	26	DF	(Ukraine)	Mykyta Burda	2	0	0	0	0	2
11	5	MF	(Ukraine)	Serhiy Sydorchuk	1	0	0	0	0	1
11	9	MF	(Ukraine)	Mykola Morozyuk	1	0	0	0	0	1
11	14	MF	(Uruguay)	Carlos de Pena	1	0	0	0	0	1
11	16	DF	(Ukraine)	Vitalii Mykolenko	0	0	0	0	1	1
11	17	MF	(Brazil)	Sidcley	1	0	0	0	0	1
11	99	MF	(Denmark)	Mikkel Duelund	1	0	0	0	0	1
				Own goal	2	0	0	0	0	2
				Total	54	4	1	4	13	76

Last updated: 31 May 2019

=== Clean sheets ===
Rank	No.	Pos	Nat	Name	Premier League	Cup	Super Cup	CL	Total
1	71	GK	(Ukraine)	Denys Boyko	15	0	1	4	20
2	1	GK	(Ukraine)	Heorhiy Bushchan	4	1	0	0	5
				Total	19	1	1	4	25

Last updated: 31 May 2019

=== Disciplinary record ===
No.	Pos	Nat	Player	Premier League			Cup			Super Cup			CL			EL			Total		
No.	Pos	Nat	Player	Yellow card	(yellow card) (yellow-red card)	Red card	Yellow card	(yellow card) (yellow-red card)	Red card	Yellow card	(yellow card) (yellow-red card)	Red card	Yellow card	(yellow card) (yellow-red card)	Red card	Yellow card	(yellow card) (yellow-red card)	Red card	Yellow card	(yellow card) (yellow-red card)	Red card
1	GK	(Ukraine)	Heorhiy Bushchan	0	0	1	0	0	0	0	0	0	0	0	0	0	0	0	0	0	1
5	MF	(Ukraine)	Serhiy Sydorchuk	4	0	0	0	0	0	0	0	0	1	0	0	0	0	0	5	0	0
6	MF	(Brazil)	Tchê Tchê	1	0	0	0	0	0	0	0	0	0	0	0	1	0	0	2	0	0
7	MF	(Slovenia)	Benjamin Verbič	5	0	0	0	0	0	0	0	0	0	0	0	3	0	0	8	0	0
8	MF	(Ukraine)	Volodymyr Shepelyev	6	0	0	1	0	0	1	0	0	0	0	0	2	1	0	10	1	0
9	MF	(Ukraine)	Mykola Morozyuk	4	0	0	0	0	0	0	0	0	0	0	0	1	0	0	5	0	0
10	FW	(Ukraine)	Mykola Shaparenko	6	0	0	1	0	0	0	0	0	1	0	0	0	0	0	8	0	0
11	MF	(Ukraine)	Vladyslav Kalitvintsev	1	0	0	0	0	0	0	0	0	0	0	0	0	0	0	1	0	0
14	MF	(Uruguay)	Carlos de Pena	1	0	0	0	0	0	0	0	0	0	0	0	0	0	0	1	0	0
15	MF	(Ukraine)	Viktor Tsyhankov	4	0	0	0	0	0	0	0	0	0	0	0	0	0	0	4	0	0
16	DF	(Ukraine)	Vitalii Mykolenko	4	0	0	0	0	0	0	0	0	0	0	0	2	0	0	6	0	0
17	MF	(Brazil)	Sidcley	1	0	0	1	0	0	0	0	0	0	0	0	0	0	0	2	0	0
18	MF	(Ukraine)	Oleksandr Andriyevskyi	4	0	0	1	0	0	0	0	0	0	0	0	0	0	0	5	0	0
19	MF	(Ukraine)	Denys Harmash	3	0	0	1	0	1	0	0	0	1	0	0	2	0	0	8	0	1
21	MF	(Ukraine)	Mykyta Kravchenko	1	0	0	0	0	0	0	0	0	0	0	0	0	0	0	1	0	0
23	DF	(Croatia)	Josip Pivarić	1	0	0	0	0	0	0	0	0	0	0	0	1	0	0	2	0	0
26	DF	(Ukraine)	Mykyta Burda	6	0	1	1	0	0	0	1	0	0	0	0	1	0	0	8	1	1
29	MF	(Ukraine)	Vitaliy Buyalskyi	6	0	0	1	0	0	0	0	0	1	0	0	3	0	0	11	0	0
30	DF	(Ukraine)	Artem Shabanov	3	1	1	0	0	0	0	0	0	0	0	0	0	0	0	3	1	1
40	MF	(Ukraine)	Heorhiy Tsitaishvili	1	0	0	0	0	0	0	0	0	0	0	0	0	0	0	1	0	0
41	FW	(Ukraine)	Artem Besyedin	4	0	0	0	0	0	0	0	0	0	0	0	0	0	0	4	0	0
43	FW	(Ukraine)	Nazariy Rusyn	4	0	0	0	0	0	0	0	0	0	0	0	1	0	0	5	0	0
44	DF	(Hungary)	Tamás Kádár	4	1	0	0	0	0	1	0	0	0	0	0	1	0	0	6	1	0
46	DF	(Ukraine)	Akhmed Alibekov	0	1	0	0	0	0	0	0	0	0	0	0	0	0	0	0	1	0
49	DF	(Ukraine)	Denys Popov	1	0	0	0	0	0	0	0	0	0	0	0	0	0	0	1	0	0
71	GK	(Ukraine)	Denys Boyko	1	0	0	0	0	0	1	0	0	0	0	0	1	0	0	3	0	0
94	DF	(Poland)	Tomasz Kędziora	3	1	1	1	0	0	1	0	0	3	0	0	2	0	0	10	1	1
			Total	79	4	4	7	0	1	4	1	0	7	0	0	21	1	0	118	6	5

Last updated: 31 May 2019
