= Volodymyr Shepelyev =

Ukrainian association football player

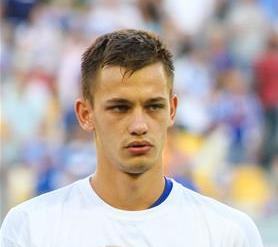

Personal information
- Full name: Volodymyr Andriyovych Shepelyev
- Date of birth: 1 June 1997 (age 29)
- Place of birth: Altestove, Odesa Oblast, Ukraine
- Height: 1.84 m (6 ft 0 in)
- Position: Midfielder

Team information
- Current team: Polissya Zhytomyr
- Number: 19

Youth career
- 2004–2010: Chornomorets Odesa
- 2010–2014: Dynamo Kyiv

Senior career*
Years	Team	Apps	(Gls)
2014–2024	Dynamo Kyiv	158	(5)
2025	Oleksandriya	12	(1)
2025–	Polissya Zhytomyr	17	(0)

International career^{‡}
2012–2013	Ukraine U16	5	(0)
2013	Ukraine U17	5	(0)
2014–2015	Ukraine U18	9	(2)
2015–2016	Ukraine U19	7	(0)
2016	Ukraine U20	1	(0)
2017–2018	Ukraine U21	5	(0)
2017–	Ukraine	7	(0)
- * Club domestic league appearances and goals as of 3 June 2026 ‡ National team caps and goals as of 10 October 2025

Volodymyr Andriyovych Shepelyev (Ukrainian: Володи́мир Андрі́йович Ше́пелєв; born 1 June 1997) is a Ukrainian professional footballer who plays as a midfielder for Polissya Zhytomyr.

== Club career ==
=== Dynamo Kyiv ===
Shepelyev is a product of the FC Chornomorets Odesa and FC Dynamo Kyiv academy systems. His first trainers were Serhiy Husyev and Pavlo Kikot. He made his debut in the Ukrainian Premier League for Dynamo on 25 February 2017 against FC Zorya Luhansk.

=== FC Oleksandriya ===
On 30 January 2025 he signed for Oleksandriya in the Ukrainian Premier League.

=== Polissya Zhytomyr ===
On 28 August 2025, Shepelyev joined Polissya Zhytomyr.

== International career ==
Shepelyev made his national team debut for Ukraine on 6 June 2017 at Merkur Arena in Graz, in a 1–0 friendly defeat to Malta.

== Career statistics ==
=== Club ===
As of match played 12 November 2023

Appearances and goals by club, season and competition
Club	Season	League			National Cup		Continental		Other		Total	
Club	Season	Division	Apps	Goals	Apps	Goals	Apps	Goals	Apps	Goals	Apps	Goals
Dynamo Kyiv	2016–17	Ukrainian Premier League	12	0	2	0	—		—		14	0
Dynamo Kyiv	2017–18	Ukrainian Premier League	24	2	4	1	10 (Note: Two appearances in UEFA Champions League, eight appearances in UEFA Europa League)	0	1 (Note: Appearance(s) in Ukrainian Super Cup)	0	39	3
Dynamo Kyiv	2018–19	Ukrainian Premier League	24	0	1	0	13 (Note: Four appearances in UEFA Champions League, nine appearances in UEFA Europa League)	0	1	0	39	0
Dynamo Kyiv	2019–20	Ukrainian Premier League	26	0	4	0	7 (Note: One appearance and one goal in UEFA Champions League, six appearances in UEFA Europa League)	1	1	0	38	1
Dynamo Kyiv	2020–21	Ukrainian Premier League	19	0	1	0	9 (Note: Five appearances in UEFA Champions League, four appearances in UEFA Europa League)	0	0	0	29	0
Dynamo Kyiv	2021–22	Ukrainian Premier League	11	0	1	0	2 (Note: Appearance(s) in UEFA Champions League)	0	0	0	14	0
Dynamo Kyiv	2022–23	Ukrainian Premier League	21	1	0	0	11 (Note: Five appearances in the UEFA Champions League, Six appearances in the UEFA Europa League)	0	0	0	32	1
Dynamo Kyiv	2023–24	Ukrainian Premier League	8	0	1	0	1 (Note: Appearance in the UEFA Europa Conference League)	0	0	0	10	0
Career total			145	3	14	1	53	1	3	0	215	5

=== International ===
As of 1 November 2021

National team	Year	Apps	Goals
Ukraine	2017	2	0
Ukraine	2019	4	0
Ukraine	2020	1	0
Total		7	0

== Honours ==
=== Club ===
Dynamo Kyiv

- Ukrainian Premier League: (5) 2016–17, 2017–18, 2018–19, 2019–20, 2023–24
- Ukrainian Super Cup: (4) 2014, 2015, 2017, 2021
- Ukrainian Cup: (3) 2014–15, 2019–20, 2020–21
