= Akhmed Alibekov =

Ukrainian footballer

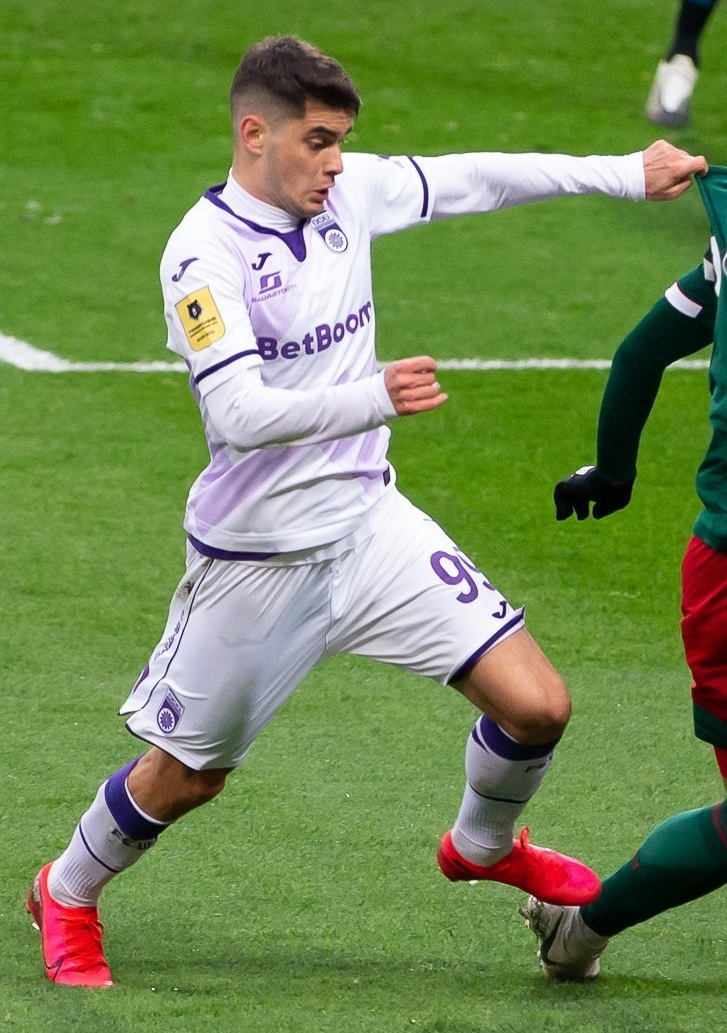
- Alibekov with FC Ufa in 2020

Personal information
- Full name: Akhmed Arslanaliyovych Alibekov
- Date of birth: 29 May 1998 (age 28)
- Place of birth: Zaporizhzhia, Ukraine
- Height: 1.82 m (6 ft 0 in)
- Position: Defensive midfielder

Team information
- Current team: Metalurh Zaporizhzhia
- Number: 10

Youth career
- 2012–2016: Metalurh Zaporizhzhia

Senior career*
Years	Team	Apps	(Gls)
2016–2023	Dynamo Kyiv	6	(0)
2019–2020	→ Slovan Liberec (loan)	14	(0)
2020–2021	→ Ufa (loan)	2	(0)
2021–2022	→ Zorya Luhansk (loan)	4	(1)
2023	Lviv	13	(0)
2023–2024	Epitsentr Kamianets-Podilskyi	16	(0)
2024–	Metalurh Zaporizhzhia	18	(2)

International career^{‡}
2014	Ukraine U17	2	(0)
2015–2016	Ukraine U18	7	(1)
2016–2017	Ukraine U19	5	(2)
2019	Ukraine U21	10	(0)
- * Club domestic league appearances and goals as of 10 June 2025 ‡ National team caps and goals as of 19 November 2020

Akhmed Arslanaliyovych Alibekov (Ukrainian: Ахмед Арсланалійович Алібеков; born 29 May 1998) is a Ukrainian professional footballer who plays as a defensive midfielder for Metalurh Zaporizhzhia.

== Career ==
Born in Zaporizhzhia, Alibekov is a product of the Metalurh Zaporizhya youth sportive school.

He played for FC Metalurh and FC Dynamo in the Ukrainian Premier League Reserves and in October 2017 he was promoted to the senior squad team. Alibekov made his debut in the Ukrainian Premier League for Dynamo Kyiv on 18 March 2018, playing in a winning match against FC Vorskla Poltava.

On 24 September 2020, he joined Russian Premier League club FC Ufa on loan.

In January 2023 he moved to Lviv.
