= Vladyslav Alyeksyeyev =

Ukrainian footballer

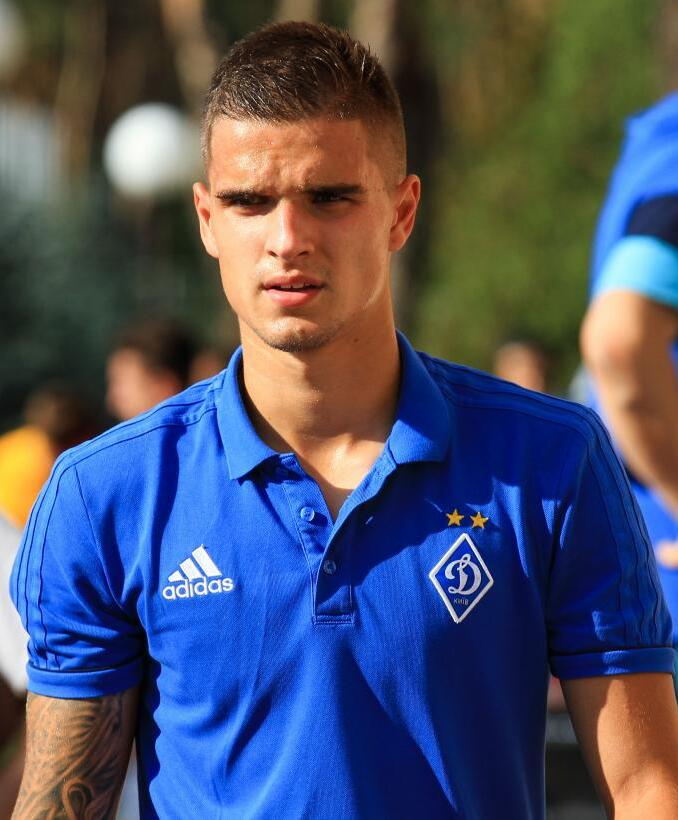

Personal information
- Full name: Vladyslav Vyacheslavovych Alyeksyeyev
- Date of birth: 29 April 1998 (age 28)
- Place of birth: Nizhyn, Ukraine
- Height: 1.84 m (6 ft 0 in)
- Position: Forward

Youth career
- –2012: KhGVUFK-1 Kharkiv
- 2013–2014: FC Metalist Kharkiv
- 2015: FC Dynamo Kyiv

Senior career*
Years	Team	Apps	(Gls)
2016–2019	FC Dynamo Kyiv	0	(0)
2016	→ FC Dynamo-2 Kyiv	3	(0)
2018–2019	→ FC Arsenal Kyiv (loan)	9	(0)

International career^{‡}
2014	Ukraine U16	4	(0)
- * Club domestic league appearances and goals as of 4 September 2019 ‡ National team caps and goals as of 4 September 2019

Vladyslav Vyacheslavovych Alyeksyeyev (Ukrainian: Владислав В'ячеславович Алєксєєв; born 29 April 1998) is a Ukrainian football forward.

== Club career ==
He made his Ukrainian First League debut for FC Dynamo-2 Kyiv on 26 March 2016 in a game against FC Naftovyk-Ukrnafta Okhtyrka. To gain playing time within the Ukrainian Premier League, in 2018 he transferred to FC Arsenal Kyiv on loan. In September 2019, Dynamo Kyiv mutually terminated the contract with Alyeksyeyev after he had just returned from hhis loan at FC Arsenal Kyiv. He had six months remaining on his Dynamo contract at the time, and afterwords he became a free agent. He currently yplays for the PROFAN media club, a non-professional media-league team.

In a later interview in 2025, former Dynamo midfielder Oleksandr Petrusenko stated that Alyeksyeyev had a lot of potential and that he was on the same level as Vladyslav Supryaha. However, Petrusenko stated Alyeksyeyev could not secure a place when he entered professional football.
