= Artur Rudko =

Ukrainian footballer

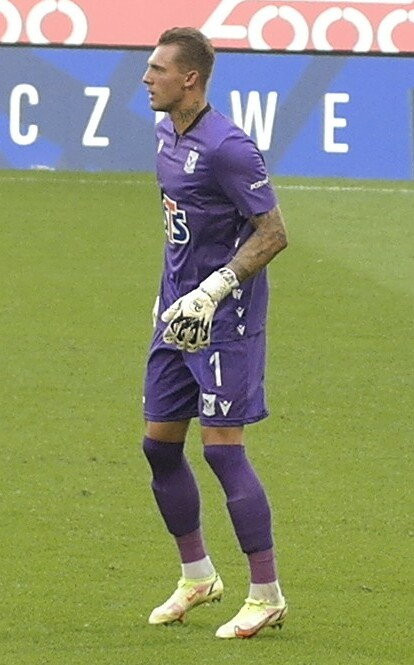
- Rudko in 2022

Personal information
- Full name: Artur Oleksiyovych Rudko
- Date of birth: 7 May 1992 (age 34)
- Place of birth: Kyiv, Ukraine
- Height: 1.90 m (6 ft 3 in)
- Position: Goalkeeper

Youth career
- 2000–2005: Dynamo Kyiv
- 2005–2007: Vidradnyi Kyiv
- 2007–2009: Dynamo Kyiv

Senior career*
Years	Team	Apps	(Gls)
2009–2019	Dynamo Kyiv	20	(0)
2009–2013	→ Dynamo-2 Kyiv	50	(0)
2015	→ Hoverla Uzhhorod (loan)	15	(0)
2019–2022	Pafos	86	(0)
2022–2023	Metalist Kharkiv	0	(0)
2022–2023	→ Lech Poznań (loan)	1	(0)
2022–2023	→ Lech Poznań II (loan)	6	(0)
2023–2024	Shakhtar Donetsk	1	(0)
2024–2025	Chornomorets Odesa	26	(0)

International career
2007–2008	Ukraine U16	2	(0)
2010–2012	Ukraine U20	2	(0)
2013	Ukraine U21	1	(0)
- * Club domestic league appearances and goals as of 31 January 2026

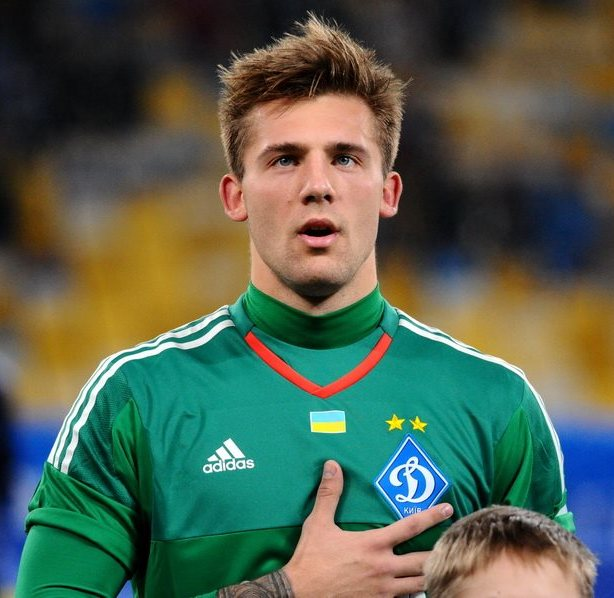
Rudko with FC Dynamo Kyiv

Artur Oleksiyovych Rudko (Ukrainian: Артур Олексійович Рудько; born 7 May 1992) is a Ukrainian professional footballer who plays as a goalkeeper.

== Career ==
On 1 July 2024, Rudko joined Ukrainian Premier League side Chornomorets Odesa, making his debut against Kryvbas Kryvyi Rih on 3 August 2024. He left the team on July 1, 2025, because his contract expired and was not renewed.

In September 2025, Rudko reportedly tried to illegally leave Ukraine. He was caught and sent for military training.

== Honours ==
Dynamo Kyiv

- Ukrainian Premier League: 2015–16
- Ukrainian Cup: 2013–14, 2014–15
- Ukrainian Super Cup: 2016, 2018, 2019
