= Volodymyr Makhankov =

Ukrainian footballer

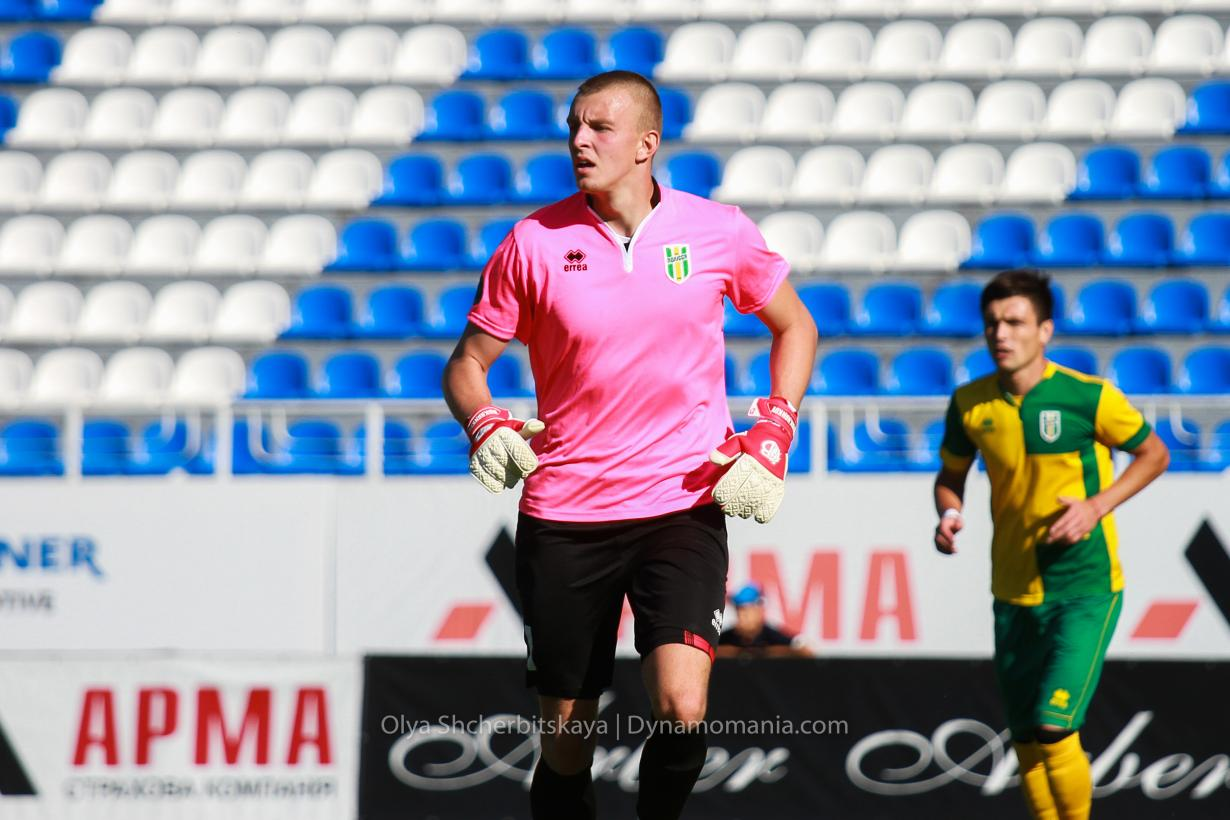

Personal information
- Full name: Volodymyr Ihorovych Makhankov
- Date of birth: 29 October 1997 (age 29)
- Place of birth: Slavutych, Ukraine
- Height: 1.96 m (6 ft 5 in)
- Position: Goalkeeper

Youth career
- 2004–2015: Dynamo Kyiv

Senior career*
Years	Team	Apps	(Gls)
2015–2019	Dynamo Kyiv	0	(0)
2020	Karpaty Lviv	0	(0)
2020–2021	Polissya Zhytomyr	23	(0)
2021–2023	Kolos Kovalivka	3	(0)
2023–2026	Kryvbas Kryvyi Rih	20	(0)

International career^{‡}
- Ukraine U15
- Ukraine U16
2012–2014	Ukraine U17	4	(0)
2014	Ukraine U18	2	(0)
2015	Ukraine U19	6	(0)
2016	Ukraine U20	1	(0)
2016	Ukraine U21	3	(0)
- * Club domestic league appearances and goals as of 7 September 2026 ‡ National team caps and goals as of 18 September 2021

Volodymyr Ihorovych Makhankov (Ukrainian: Володимир Ігорович Маханьков; born 29 October 1997) is a Ukrainian professional footballer who last played as a goalkeeper for Kryvbas Kryvyi Rih in the Ukrainian Premier League.

== Career ==
Makhankov was born in Slavutych, and in age of 6 he began to play football in Kyiv, where he joined the FC Dynamo Kyiv youth sportive school system, where his first trainer was Viktor Kashchey.

Despite being a part of Dynamo's sportive system, Makhankov never make his debut for the main team and in March 2020 transferred to the Ukrainian Premier League side FC Dynamo Kyiv and later this year, to the Ukrainian Second League side FC Polissya Zhytomyr, where he become a first choice goalkeeping player. In June 2021 he signed a 3 years deal with FC Kolos Kovalivka.
