= Mykyta Burda =

Ukrainian footballer

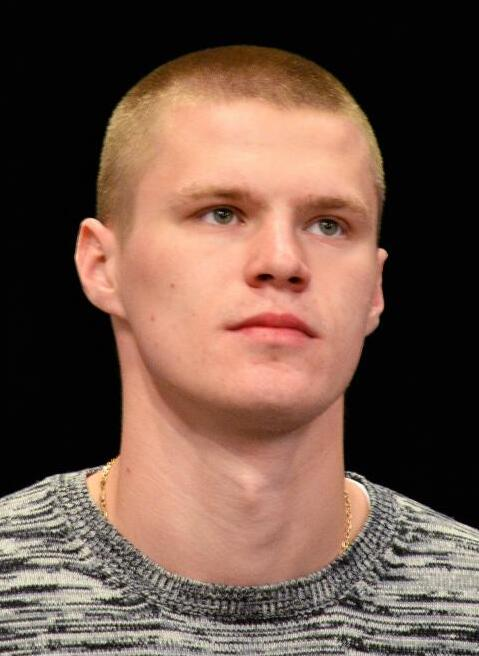

Personal information
- Full name: Mykyta Valeriyovych Burda
- Date of birth: 24 March 1995 (age 31)
- Place of birth: Yenakiieve, Ukraine
- Height: 1.87 m (6 ft 2 in)
- Position: Centre-back

Team information
- Current team: Kolos Kovalivka
- Number: 6

Youth career
- 2008–2010: RVUFK Kyiv
- 2010–2014: Dynamo Kyiv

Senior career*
Years	Team	Apps	(Gls)
2014–2023	Dynamo Kyiv	57	(6)
2023	→ Zorya Luhansk (loan)	0	(0)
2023–	Kolos Kovalivka	59	(3)

International career^{‡}
2011–2012	Ukraine U17	6	(0)
2014	Ukraine U19	3	(1)
2015	Ukraine U20	4	(0)
2015	Ukraine U21	1	(0)
2018–2019	Ukraine	8	(0)
- * Club domestic league appearances and goals as of 3 June 2026 ‡ National team caps and goals as of 18 March 2025

Mykyta Valeriyovych Burda (Ukrainian: Микита Валерійович Бурда; born 24 March 1995) is a Ukrainian professional footballer who plays as a centre-back for Kolos Kovalivka.

== Club career ==
Born in Yenakiyeve, a city village in Donetsk Oblast, Mykyta began playing football in Yahotyn, Kyiv Oblast, where he attended local sports school. When he was sixteen, Burda transferred to Dynamo Kyiv football academy, where he began playing for Dynamo Kyiv youth and reserve squads.

On 23 August 2014, Burda made his senior team debut in the 3-1 Ukrainian Cup victory over Zirka Kirovohrad at Zirka Stadium, playing all 90 minutes.

It wasn't until the 2018–19 season, however, that Burda firmly established himself as a first-team regular, playing in a total of 43 matches for Dynamo across all competitions.

== International career ==
Burda was part of the Ukraine under-20 squad that participated in the 2015 FIFA U-20 World Cup, reaching the second round. He played in all four of his team's matches at the tournament.

On 31 May 2018, Burda made his Ukraine national team debut, playing 90 minutes in a 0-0 friendly draw against Morocco at Stade de Genève.

== Career statistics ==
=== Club ===
As of the end of 2018-19 season

Club	Season	League			National Cup		Continental		Other		Total	
Club	Season	Division	Apps	Goals	Apps	Goals	Apps	Goals	Apps	Goals	Apps	Goals
Dynamo Kyiv	2014–15	Ukrainian Premier League	4	1	3	0	6 (Note: Appearance(s) in the UEFA Europa League)	0	—		13	1
Dynamo Kyiv	2015–16	Ukrainian Premier League	—		2	0	—		—		2	0
Dynamo Kyiv	2016–17	Ukrainian Premier League	5	1	—		1 (Note: Appearance(s) in the UEFA Champions League)	0	—		6	1
Dynamo Kyiv	2017–18	Ukrainian Premier League	12	2	2	0	2	0	—		16	2
Dynamo Kyiv	2018–19	Ukrainian Premier League	26	2	2	0	14 (Note: Four appearances in the UEFA Champions League, ten appearances in the UEFA Europa League)	0	1 (Note: Appearance in the Ukrainian Super Cup)	0	43	2
Dynamo Kyiv	Total		47	6	9	0	23	0	1	0	80	6

=== International ===
As of 12 June 2019

National team	Year	Caps	Goals
Ukraine	2018	6	0
Ukraine	2019	1	0
Total		7	0

== Honours ==
=== Dynamo Kyiv ===
- Ukrainian Premier League: 2014–15, 2015–16
- Ukrainian Cup: 2014–15
