= Yuriy Mozharovskyi =

Ukrainian football referee (born 1976)

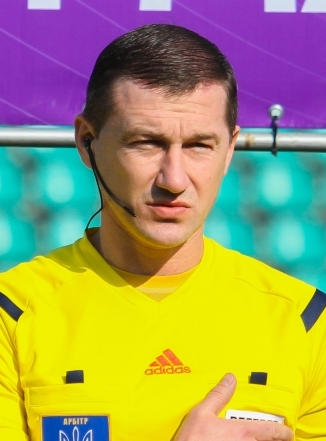
- Mozharovskyi in 2017
- Full name: Yuriy Andriyovych Mozharovskyi
- Born: 2 October 1976 (age 50); Lviv, Ukraine SSR
- Other occupation: Instructor at the Lviv University

Domestic
Years	League	Role
2007–	Ukrainian Premier League	Referee

International
Years	League	Role
2011–	FIFA listed	Referee

Yuriy Andriyovych Mozharovskyi (Ukrainian: Юрій Андрійович Можаровський; born 2 October 1976, in Lviv, Ukraine) is a Ukrainian professional football referee. He has been a full international for FIFA since 2011.
