= Oleksandr Osman =

Ukrainian footballer

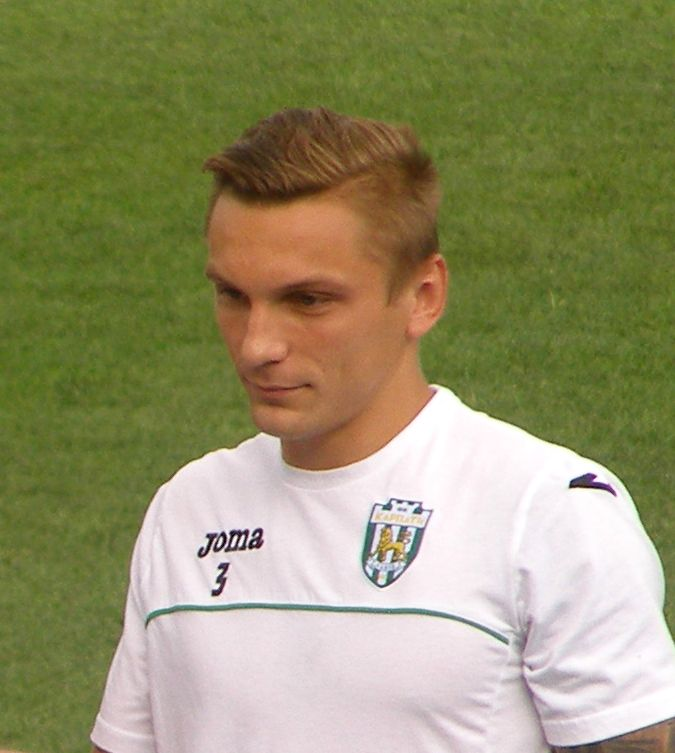

Personal information
- Full name: Oleksandr Viktorovych Osman
- Date of birth: 18 April 1996 (age 30)
- Place of birth: Serpneve, Kharkiv Oblast, Ukraine
- Height: 1.69 m (5 ft 6 1/2 in)
- Position: Defender

Team information
- Current team: UCSA Tarasivka
- Number: 15

Youth career
- 2009–2012: UFK Kharkiv
- 2012: Metalist Kharkiv

Senior career*
Years	Team	Apps	(Gls)
2012–2015	Metalist Kharkiv	3	(0)
2015–2020	Dynamo Kyiv	0	(0)
2017	→ Karpaty Lviv (loan)	1	(0)
2018–2019	→ Arsenal Kyiv (loan)	8	(0)
2019–2020	→ Metalist 1925 Kharkiv (loan)	8	(0)
2020–2025	Obolon Kyiv	70	(0)
2021	→ Obolon-2 Bucha	4	(0)
2025	Chornomorets Odesa	13	(0)
2026–	UCSA Tarasivka	12	(0)

International career^{‡}
2012	Ukraine U16	4	(0)
2012–2013	Ukraine U17	11	(0)
2014–2015	Ukraine U19	10	(0)
2016	Ukraine U20	1	(0)
2016–2017	Ukraine U21	4	(0)
- * Club domestic league appearances and goals as of 4 June 2026 ‡ National team caps and goals as of 31 May 2018

Oleksandr Viktorovych Osman (Ukrainian: Олександр Вікторович Осман; born 18 April 1996) is a Ukrainian professional footballer who plays as a defender for UCSA Tarasivka.

== Career ==
Osman is a product of the UFK Kharkiv and Metalist Kharkiv Youth School Systems. He made his debut for FC Metalist in the match against FC Shakhtar Donetsk on 9 August 2014 in the Ukrainian Premier League.

=== Chornomorets Odesa ===
On 20 June 2025, Osman joined Chornomorets Odesa. On 2 August 2025 in the 1st round match of Ukrainian First League between FC Chornomorets and Nyva Ternopil he made his official debut as player of Chornomorets. On 1 January 2026, Osman left Chornomorets Odesa.

=== UCSA Tarasivka ===
On 5 February 2026, Osman joined UCSA Tarasivka. As a player for UCSA, he made his official debut against Chornomorets Odesa on 21 March 2026.
