= Silas (footballer, born 1996) =

Brazilian footballer (born 1996)

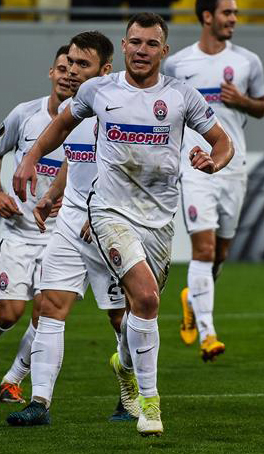
- Silas with Zorya Luhansk in 2017

Personal information
- Full name: Silas Araújo da Silva
- Date of birth: 30 May 1996 (age 30)
- Place of birth: Pelotas, Rio Grande do Sul, Brazil
- Height: 1.76 m (5 ft 9 in)
- Position: Midfielder

Team information
- Current team: CSA

Youth career
- 2006–2012: Progresso
- 2012–2015: Internacional

Senior career*
| Years | Team | Apps | (Gls) |
| 2015–2017 | Internacional | 0 | (0) |
| 2017–2020 | Zorya Luhansk | 48 | (5) |
| 2019–2020 | → Ironi Kiryat Shmona (loan) | 19 | (0) |
| 2020 | Dinamo Minsk | 7 | (0) |
| 2021 | CSA | 32 | (3) |
| 2022 | Guarani | 13 | (1) |
| 2023 | Barra-SC | 11 | (0) |
| 2023 | Concórdia | 11 | (1) |
| 2024 | Tombense | 4 | (0) |
| 2024 | → Novo Hamburgo (loan) | 12 | (1) |
| 2025– | CSA | | |
- * Club domestic league appearances and goals as of 31 December 2024

Silas Araújo da Silva (born 30 May 1996), commonly known as Silas, is a Brazilian professional footballer who plays as a midfielder for CSA.

== Career ==
Silas is a product of Atlético Progresso Clube and Sport Club Internacional youth sportive systems.

In May 2017, he signed a two-year deal with the Ukrainian Premier League's FC Zorya Luhansk.

== Honours ==
CSA

- Campeonato Alagoano: 2021
