= 2015–16 FC Shakhtar Donetsk season =

Shakhtar Donetsk
2015–16 season
- Chairman: Rinat Akhmetov
- Manager: Mircea Lucescu
- Stadium: Donbas Arena
- Premier League: 2nd
- Ukrainian Cup: Winners
- Super Cup: Winners
- UEFA Champions League: Group stage
- UEFA Europa League: Semi-finals
- Top goalscorer: League: Alex Teixeira (22); All: Alex Teixeira (26)
- Highest home attendance: 34,267 vs Sevilla
- Lowest home attendance: 1,200 vs Ternopil
- Average home league attendance: 4,324
Home colours	Away colours	Third colours

The 2015–16 Shakhtar Donetsk season was the club's twenty-fifth season.

== Season events ==
On 2 January, Ruslan Malinovskyi joined Genk on loan for the remainder of the season.

== Squad ==
As of match played 21 May 2016

Number	Name	Nationality	Position	Date of birth (age)	Signed from	Signed in	Contract ends	Apps.	Goals
Goalkeepers
23	Bohdan Sarnavskyi	(Ukraine)	GK	29 January 1995 (aged 21)	Arsenal Kyiv	2014		8	0
30	Andriy Pyatov	(Ukraine)	GK	28 June 1984 (aged 31)	Vorskla Poltava	2007		301	0
32	Anton Kanibolotskyi	(Ukraine)	GK	16 May 1988 (aged 28)	Dnipro Dnipropetrovsk	2012	2017	52	0
Defenders
5	Oleksandr Kucher	(Ukraine)	DF	22 October 1982 (aged 33)	Metalist Kharkiv	2006		264	11
13	Vyacheslav Shevchuk	(Ukraine)	DF	13 May 1979 (aged 37)	Dnipro Dnipropetrovsk	2005		241	4
18	Ivan Ordets	(Ukraine)	DF	8 July 1992 (aged 23)	Academy	2009		41	0
25	Mykola Matviyenko	(Ukraine)	DF	28 February 2000 (aged 16)	Academy	2015		6	0
31	Ismaily	(Brazil)	DF	11 January 1990 (aged 26)	Braga	2013	2017	51	5
33	Darijo Srna (Captain)	(Croatia)	DF	1 May 1982 (aged 34)	Hajduk Split	2003		490	49
38	Serhiy Kryvtsov	(Ukraine)	DF	15 March 1991 (aged 25)	Metalurh Zaporizhzhia	2010	2015	83	6
44	Yaroslav Rakitskyi	(Ukraine)	DF	3 August 1989 (aged 26)	Academy	2009		244	12
66	Márcio Azevedo	(Brazil)	DF	5 February 1986 (aged 30)	Metalist Kharkiv	2014	2018	17	0
Midfielders
6	Taras Stepanenko	(Ukraine)	MF	8 August 1989 (aged 26)	Metalurh Zaporizhzhia	2010	2015	158	11
7	Wellington Nem	(Brazil)	MF	6 February 1992 (aged 24)	Fluminense	2013	2018	40	9
8	Fred	(Brazil)	MF	5 March 1993 (aged 23)	Internacional	2013	2018	90	7
10	Bernard	(Brazil)	MF	8 September 1992 (aged 23)	Atlético Mineiro	2013	2018	91	11
11	Marlos	(Brazil)	MF	7 June 1988 (aged 27)	Metalist Kharkiv	2014	2019	83	18
14	Vasyl Kobin	(Ukraine)	MF	24 May 1985 (aged 30)	Karpaty Lviv	2009		78	5
16	Vitaliy Vitsenets	(Ukraine)	MF	3 August 1990 (aged 25)	Zorya Luhansk	2010		25	2
17	Maksym Malyshev	(Ukraine)	MF	24 December 1992 (aged 23)	Academy	2009		34	5
20	Giorgi Arabidze	(Georgia (country))	MF	4 March 1998 (aged 18)	Locomotive Tbilisi	2015		3	0
28	Taison	(Brazil)	MF	17 January 1988 (aged 28)	Metalist Kharkiv	2013	2017	121	19
58	Andriy Korobenko	(Ukraine)	MF	28 May 1997 (aged 18)	Academy	2014		3	0
74	Viktor Kovalenko	(Ukraine)	MF	14 February 1996 (aged 20)	Academy	2008		50	4
Forwards
9	Dentinho	(Brazil)	FW	19 January 1989 (aged 27)	Corinthians	2011	2016	71	8
19	Facundo Ferreyra	(Argentina)	FW	14 March 1991 (aged 25)	Vélez Sarsfield	2013	2017	44	10
21	Oleksandr Hladkyi	(Ukraine)	FW	24 August 1987 (aged 28)	Kharkiv	2007		180	61
22	Eduardo (Note: Eduardo was born in Rio de Janeiro, Brazil, but qualified to represent Croatia in 2002, representing them between 2004 and 2014.)	(Croatia)	FW	25 February 1983 (aged 33)	Arsenal	2010	2014	151	53
41	Andriy Boryachuk	(Ukraine)	FW	24 August 1987 (aged 28)	Academy	2015		3	2
59	Oleksandr Zubkov	(Ukraine)	FW	3 August 1996 (aged 19)	Olimpik Donetsk	2011		2	0
Reserve squad
15	Ilya Ichuaidze	(Ukraine)	DF	18 March 1996 (aged 20)	Academy	2015		0	0
17	Dmytro Shevchenko	(Ukraine)	DF	18 January 1997 (aged 19)	Academy	2015		0	0
42	Denys Arendaruk	(Ukraine)	FW	16 April 1996 (aged 20)	Academy	2013		0	0
46	Igor Sukhaninskyi	(Ukraine)	MF	1 July 1998 (aged 17)	Academy	2015		0	0
47	Dmytro Steflyuk	(Ukraine)	DF	15 July 1997 (aged 18)	Academy	2015		0	0
49	Oleksandr Pikhalyonok	(Ukraine)	MF	7 May 1997 (aged 19)	Academy	2014		0	0
51	Mykyta Bezuhlyi	(Ukraine)	DF	1 August 1995 (aged 20)	Academy	2012		0	0
52	Ihor Kyryukhantsev	(Ukraine)	DF	29 January 1996 (aged 20)	Academy	2013		0	0
53	Ivan Semenikhin	(Ukraine)	DF	28 September 1998 (aged 17)	UFK Kharkiv	2015		0	0
54	Yevhen Hrytsenko	(Ukraine)	GK	5 February 1995 (aged 21)	Academy	2012		0	0
55	Oleh Kudryk	(Ukraine)	GK	17 October 1996 (aged 19)	Lviv	2011		0	0
60	Vasyl Sagaydak	(Ukraine)	DF	15 May 1995 (aged 21)	Academy	2015		0	0
62	Artem Habelok	(Ukraine)	MF	2 January 1995 (aged 21)	Academy	2013		0	0
63	Ruslan Yefanov	(Ukraine)	GK	5 May 1996 (aged 20)	Academy	2012		0	0
64	Artem Ivanov	(Ukraine)	MF	21 January 1995 (aged 21)	Academy	2015		0	0
65	Danylo Sahutkin	(Ukraine)	DF	19 April 1996 (aged 20)	Academy	2013		0	0
67	Vladyslav Buhay	(Ukraine)	FW	27 October 1997 (aged 18)	Academy	2015		0	0
71	Mykhaylo Shyshka	(Ukraine)	DF	5 July 1994 (aged 21)	Academy	2011		0	0
73	Serhiy Horbunov	(Ukraine)	MF	14 March 1994 (aged 22)	Dnipro Dnipropetrovsk	2015		0	0
75	Rostyslav Rusyn	(Ukraine)	MF	26 October 1995 (aged 20)	Academy	2012		0	0
80	Taras Kacharaba	(Ukraine)	DF	7 January 1995 (aged 21)	Academy	2012		0	0
81	Bogdan Kuksenko	(Ukraine)	DF	11 February 1996 (aged 20)	Metalist Kharkiv	2014		0	0
82	Mykyta Adamenko	(Ukraine)	MF	14 September 1995 (aged 20)	Academy	2014		0	0
Away on loan
	Mykyta Shevchenko	(Ukraine)	GK	26 January 1993 (aged 23)	Academy	2011		0	0
	Bohdan Butko	(Ukraine)	DF	13 January 1991 (aged 25)	Academy	2008		0	0
	Alan Patrick	(Brazil)	MF	13 May 1991 (aged 25)	Santos	2011	2016	6	2
	Ruslan Malinovskyi	(Ukraine)	MF	4 May 1993 (aged 23)	Academy	2011		0	0
	Vyacheslav Tankovskyi	(Ukraine)	MF	16 August 1995 (aged 20)	Academy	2008		0	0
	Andriy Totovytskyi	(Ukraine)	MF	20 January 1993 (aged 23)	Academy	2010		0	0
Players who left during the season
24	Serhiy Hryn	(Ukraine)	MF	6 June 1994 (aged 21)	Academy	2011		1	1
29	Alex Teixeira	(Brazil)	MF	6 January 1990 (aged 26)	Vasco da Gama	2010	2015	219	85

=== Out on loan ===
Note: Flags indicate national team as defined under FIFA eligibility rules; some limited exceptions apply. Players may hold more than one non-FIFA nationality.

No.	Pos.	Nation	Player
—	GK	UKR	Mykyta Shevchenko (on loan to Zorya Luhansk)
—	GK	UKR	Yaroslav Stavytskyi (on loan to Oleksandriya)
—	GK	UKR	Rustam Khudzhamov (on loan to Illichivets Mariupol)
—	DF	UKR	Mykhaylo Pysko (on loan to Illichivets Mariupol)
—	DF	UKR	Serhiy Vakulenko (on loan to Illichivets Mariupol)
—	DF	UKR	Ihor Duts (on loan to Illichivets Mariupol)
—	DF	UKR	Yaroslav Fursov (on loan to Zorya Luhansk)
—	DF	UKR	Eduard Sobol (on loan to Metalist Kharkiv)
—	DF	UKR	Ihor Honchar (on loan to Hoverla Uzhhorod)
—	DF	UKR	Bohdan Butko (on loan to Amkar Perm)
—	DF	UKR	Oleksandr Volovyk (on loan to Oud-Heverlee Leuven)
—	MF	UKR	Oleksandr Mihunov (on loan to Illichivets Mariupol)
—	MF	UKR	Maksym Zhychykov (on loan to Illichivets Mariupol)
—	MF	UKR	Dmytro Ivanisenya (on loan to Illichivets Mariupol)
—	MF	UKR	Vitaliy Koltsov (on loan to Illichivets Mariupol)
—	MF	UKR	Yuriy Hluschuk (on loan to Illichivets Mariupol)
—	MF	UKR	Serhiy Hryn (on loan to Illichivets Mariupol)
—	MF	UKR	Andriy Totovytskyi (on loan to Zorya Luhansk)
—	MF	UKR	Dmytro Hrechyshkin (on loan to Zorya Luhansk)
—	MF	UKR	Oleksandr Karavayev (on loan to Zorya Luhansk)

No.	Pos.	Nation	Player
—	MF	UKR	Ivan Petryak (on loan to Zorya Luhansk)
—	MF	UKR	Vyacheslav Tankovskyi (on loan to Zorya Luhansk)
—	MF	UKR	Denys Kozhanov (on loan to Karpaty Lviv)
—	MF	UKR	Oleksiy Polyanskyi (on loan to Metalist Kharkiv)
—	MF	UKR	Oleh Danchenko (on loan to Chornomorets Odesa)
—	MF	UKR	Ihor Bykovskyi (on loan to Arsenal-Kyiv)
—	MF	UKR	Ruslan Malinovskyi (on loan to Genk)
—	MF	UKR	Serhiy Bolbat (on loan to Lokeren)
—	MF	UKR	Vasyl Shtander (on loan to Guria Lanchkhuti)
—	MF	UKR	Vyacheslav Churko (on loan to Puskás Akadémia)
—	MF	GEO	David Targamadze (on loan to FC Oleksandriya)
—	MF	BRA	Alan Patrick (on loan to Flamengo)
—	FW	UKR	Pylyp Budkivskyi (on loan to Zorya Luhansk)
—	FW	UKR	Denys Bezborodko (on loan to Zorya Luhansk)
—	FW	UKR	Artur Zahorulko (on loan to Illichivets Mariupol)
—	FW	UKR	Maksym Ilyuk (on loan to Illichivets Mariupol)
—	FW	UKR	Anton Shynder (on loan to Vorskla Poltava)
—	FW	UKR	Andriy Kapelyan (on loan to Ternopil)
—	FW	UKR	Vladyslav Kulach (on loan to Eskişehirspor)

== Transfers ==
=== In ===
Date	Position	Nationality	Name	From	Fee	Ref.
12 July 2015	FW	(Croatia)	Eduardo	Flamengo	Undisclosed	
29 February 2016	DF	(Ukraine)	Oleh Danchenko	Chornomorets Odesa	Undisclosed	

=== Out ===
Date	Position	Nationality	Name	To	Fee	Ref.
1 July 2015	MF	(Brazil)	Douglas Costa	Bayern Munich	Undisclosed	
2 July 2015	FW	(Brazil)	Luiz Adriano	A.C. Milan	Undisclosed	
6 July 2015	MF	(Brazil)	Fernando	Sampdoria	Undisclosed	
31 January 2016	MF	(Ukraine)	Vasyl Shtander	Guria Lanchkhuti	Undisclosed	
5 February 2016	MF	(Brazil)	Alex Teixeira	Jiangsu Suning	Undisclosed	
2 March 2016	GK	(Ukraine)	Rustam Khudzhamov	Illichivets Mariupol	Undisclosed	

=== Loans out ===
Date From	Position	Nationality	Name	To	Date To	Ref.
12 July 2015	MF	(Ukraine)	Oleksandr Karavayev	Zorya Luhansk	31 December 2016	
12 July 2015	MF	(Ukraine)	Dmytro Hrechyshkin	Zorya Luhansk	31 December 2017	
20 July 2015	MF	(Ukraine)	Serhiy Bolbat	Sporting Lokeren	30 June 2017	
20 August 2015	MF	(Brazil)	Oleksandr Volovyk	Oud-Heverlee Leuven	30 June 2016	
27 August 2015	MF	(Georgia (country))	David Targamadze	Oleksandriya	30 June 2016	
1 September 2015	GK	(Ukraine)	Rustam Khudzhamov	Metalist Kharkiv	31 December 2015	
2 January 2016	MF	(Ukraine)	Ruslan Malinovskyi	KRC Genk	30 June 2017	
15 January 2016	MF	(Ukraine)	Serhiy Hryn	Illichivets Mariupol	30 June 2016	
1 March 2016	DF	(Ukraine)	Oleh Danchenko	Chornomorets Odesa	30 June 2016	

=== Released ===
Date	Position	Nationality	Name	Joined	Date	Ref.
2 March 2016	GK	(Ukraine)	Rustam Khudzhamov	Illichivets Mariupol	2 March 2016	
30 June 2016	DF	(Ukraine)	Yaroslav Fursov	Zorya Luhansk	1 July 2016	
30 June 2016	DF	(Ukraine)	Ihor Honchar	Senica	18 July 2016	
30 June 2016	MF	(Ukraine)	Denys Kozhanov	Dacia Chișinău	1 July 2016	
30 June 2016	FW	(Ukraine)	Oleksandr Hladkyi	Dynamo Kyiv	1 July 2016	
30 June 2016	FW	(Ukraine)	Maksym Ilyuk	Bukovyna Chernivtsi	2 March 2017	
30 June 2016	FW	(Ukraine)	Anton Shynder	Amkar Perm	1 July 2016	
30 June 2016	FW	(Ukraine)	Vitaliy Vitsenets	Mariupol	14 July 2017	

== Friendlies ==
27 June 2015	Shakhtar Donetsk (Ukraine)	1–0	(Azerbaijan) Neftçi Baku	Going am Wilden Kaiser, Austria
18:00 EEST (UTC+3)	Bolbat 81'	Summary		Stadium: SC Going; Referee: Nenad Costačević

30 June 2015	Shakhtar Donetsk (Ukraine)	2–0	(Albania) Skënderbeu Korçë	Going am Wilden Kaiser, Austria
18:00 EEST (UTC+3)	Karavayev (yellow card) 21'; Marlos 37', 46'	Summary		Stadium: SC Going; Referee: Mirco Ostojic

2 July 2015	Shakhtar Donetsk (Ukraine)	1–2	(Germany) Eintracht Braunschweig	Mittersill, Austria
19:00 EEST (UTC+3)	Malyshev (yellow card) 10'; Ordets (yellow card) 22'; Teixeira (yellow card) 43'; Kobin 83'; Shevchuk (yellow card) 89'	Summary	Ofosu-Ayeh 37'; Matuszczyk (yellow card) 43'; Düker 67'	Stadium: Stadion Mittersill; Attendance: 400; Referee: Mirco Ostojic

4 July 2015	Shakhtar Donetsk (Ukraine)	0–0 (14–15 p)	(Poland) Lechia Gdańsk	Poland
19:00 EEST (UTC+3)	Ordets (yellow card) 40'; Taison (yellow card) 42'	Summary	Volski (yellow card) 66'; Valente (yellow card) 78'	Stadium: Arena Lublin, Poland; Referee: Mateus Zlotinski

5 July 2015	Shakhtar Donetsk (Ukraine)	3–0	(France) Monaco	Poland
19:00 EEST (UTC+3)	Marlos 6', 15'; Taison 51'	Summary		Stadium: Arena Lublin, Poland; Referee: Mateus Zlotinski

7 July 2015	Shakhtar Donetsk (Ukraine)	2–3	(Switzerland) Sion	Switzerland
EEST (UTC+3)	Dentinho (yellow card) 11'; Teixeira 22', 45+1'; Kucher (yellow card) 45'	Summary	Ziegler 21'; Salatić 37' (pen.); Konaté 41', (yellow card) 45'	Stadium: Saint Germain stadium Referee: Sascha Amof

9 July 2015	Shakhtar Donetsk (Ukraine)	3–1	(Switzerland) Basel	Switzerland
EEST (UTC+3)	Hladkyy 33', 70'; Teixeira (yellow card) 81'; Marlos 85'	Summary	Janko 5'	Stadium: Saint Germain stadium Referee: Stephan Klossner

3 September 2015	Carpi (Italy)	2–1	(Ukraine) Shakhtar Donetsk	Carpi, Italy
21:30 EEST (UTC+3)	Lasagna 84', 88'	Summary	Fred (yellow card) 19' (yellow-red card) 56'; Eduardo 43' (pen.); Teixeira (yellow card) 53'	Stadium: Stadio Sandro Cabassi; Attendance: 1,133; Referee: Marco Piccini Di Foili

5 September 2015	Atalanta (Italy)	0–1	(Ukraine) Shakhtar Donetsk	Bergamo, Italy
21:30 EEST (UTC+3)		Summary	Teixeira 46'; Kobin (yellow card) 56'; Dentinho (yellow card) 76'	Stadium: Stadio Atleti Azzurri d'Italia; Referee: Michael Fabbri

9 October 2015	Konyaspor (Turkey)	2–4	(Ukraine) Shakhtar Donetsk	Antalya, Turkey
18:00 EEST (UTC+3)	Alibaz; Holmén	Summary	Kryvtsov; Hladkyy; Zubkov; Wellington Nem	Stadium: Mardan Sport Somplex

13 November 2015	Antalyaspor (Turkey)	1–1	(Ukraine) Shakhtar Donetsk	Antalya, Turkey
18:00 EET (UTC+2)	Bekmezci 18'	Summary	Ismaily 47'	Stadium: Titanic stadium

15 November 2015	Alanyaspor (Turkey)	1–2	(Ukraine) Shakhtar Donetsk	Antalya, Turkey
17:00 EET (UTC+2)	Özkan 53'	Summary	Ferreyra 17', 60' (pen.)	Stadium: WOW Football Center

17 January 2016 2016 Florida Cup	Shakhtar Donetsk (Ukraine)	1–1	(Brazil) Fluminense	Orlando, United States
21:00 EET (UTC+2)	Stepanenko (yellow card) 28'; Ferreyra 48'; Rakytskyi (yellow card) 78'	Summary	Marcos Júnior (yellow card) 26'; Jonathan (yellow card) 50'; Edson (yellow card) 76'; Magno Alves 82'	Stadium: ESPN Wide World of Sports Complex; Attendance: 4,200; Referee: Kevin Terry Júnior

20 January 2016 2016 Florida Cup	Shakhtar Donetsk (Ukraine)	2–3	(Brazil) Corinthians	Orlando, United States
18:45 EET (UTC+2)	Taison 23'; Stepanenko (yellow card) 27'; Srna (yellow card) 60'; Kucher (yellow card) 64' (red card) 82'; Kovalenko 80'	Summary	Danilo 12'; Romero 36', 44'; Fagner (yellow card) 54'; Bruno Henrique (yellow card) 65'; Elias (yellow card) 82'	Stadium: ESPN Wide World of Sports Complex; Attendance: 3,400; Referee: Guido Gonzalez

24 January 2016	Shakhtar Donetsk (Ukraine)	3–1	(Sweden) BK Häcken	Fort Lauderdale, United States
21:00 EET (UTC+2)	Hladkyy 12'; Marlos 24'; Ferreyra 59'	Summary	Jeremejeff 15'	Stadium: Lockhart Stadium; Attendance: 50; Referee: Everton Cole

26 January 2016	Boca Raton (United States)	1–5	(Ukraine) Shakhtar Donetsk	Boca Raton, United States
2:00 EET (UTC+2)	Badett 2'	Summary	Ordets 5', (yellow card) 88'; Zubkov 35'; Arabidze 64', 90'; Kovalenko 85'	Stadium: The Shipyard; Attendance: 800; Referee: Marcos de Oliveira

27 January 2016	Fort Lauderdale Strikers (United States)	0–1	(Ukraine) Shakhtar Donetsk	Fort Lauderdale, United States
2:00 EET (UTC+2)	Skiadas (yellow card) 89'	Summary	Kucher (yellow card) 69'; Marlos 79'	Stadium: Lockhart Stadium; Attendance: 1,300; Referee: Rubie Vazquez

27 January 2016	FC Miami City Champions (United States)	0–5	(Ukraine) Shakhtar Donetsk	Miami, United States
22:00 EET (UTC+2)	Suarez (yellow card) 73'	Summary	Ferreyra 5', 11'; Zubkov 24'; Boryachuk 77', 78'; Shevchuk (red card) 82'	Stadium: FIU Stadium; Attendance: 200; Referee: Winston O'Connor

2 February 2016	Shakhtar Donetsk (Ukraine)	3–1	(Poland) Piast	Murcia, Spain
20:00 EEST (UTC+3)	Kovalenko 16', 67'; Kucher (yellow card) 28'; Eduardo 42'	Summary	Mráz 7'; Pietrowski (yellow card) 11'; Nešpor (yellow card) 28'; Murawski (yellow card) 40'	Stadium: Pinatar Arena; Attendance: 100; Referee: Tore Hansen

5 February 2016	Shakhtar Donetsk (Ukraine)	2–0	(Croatia) Dinamo Zagreb	Murcia, Spain
20:00 EEST (UTC+3)	Eduardo 6'; Taison 29'; Wellington Nem (yellow card) 83'	Summary	Schildenfeld (yellow card) 43'	Stadium: Pinatar Arena; Attendance: 150; Referee: Tore Hansen

8 February 2016	Shakhtar Donetsk (Ukraine)	5–2	(Georgia (country)) Locomotive Tbilisi	Murcia, Spain
19:00 EEST (UTC+3)	Malyshev 8'; Boryachuk 27'; Marlos 53'; Stepanenko (yellow card) 58'; Hladkyy 64', 66'; Rakitskiy (yellow card) 71'	Summary	Benashvili 31' (pen.); Chanturia 90'	Stadium: Pinatar Arena; Attendance: 100; Referee: Pedro Tristan Menor

10 February 2016	Shakhtar Donetsk (Ukraine)	0–0	(Denmark) Randers	Murcia, Spain
19:30 EEST (UTC+3)		Summary	Amini (yellow card) 44'; Yakovenko (yellow card) 64'	Stadium: Pinatar Arena; Attendance: 100; Referee: Joe Martines

11 February 2016	Shakhtar Donetsk (Ukraine)	1–1	(Moldova) Dacia Chișinău	Murcia, Spain
12:00 EEST (UTC+3)	Matviyenko (yellow card) 10'; Boryachuk 47'	Summary	Mamah (yellow card) 40'; Stjepanović 43'	Stadium: Pinatar Arena; Attendance: 100; Referee: Alfonso Pérez

== Competitions ==
=== Overall ===
Competition	First match	Last match	Starting round	Final position	Record							
Competition	First match	Last match	Starting round	Final position	Pld	W	D	L	GF	GA	GD	Win %
Premier League	19 July 2015	15 May 2016	Matchday 1	Runners-up	26	20	3	3	76	25	+51	76.92
Ukrainian Cup	22 August 2015	21 May 2016	Round of 32	Winners	8	6	1	1	22	3	+19	75.00
Super Cup	14 July 2015		Final	Winners	1	1	0	0	2	0	+2	100.00
UEFA Champions League	28 July 2015	8 December 2015	Third qualifying round	Group Stage	10	3	2	5	13	16	−3	30.00
UEFA Europa League	18 February 2016	5 May 2016	Last 32	Semifinal	8	5	2	1	16	7	+9	62.50
Total					53	35	8	10	129	51	+78	66.04

Last updated: 21 May 2016
Source: Results

=== Super Cup ===
14 July 2015	Dynamo Kyiv	0–2	Shakhtar Donetsk	Odesa
21:00 EEST (UTC+3)	Sydorchuk (yellow card) 27'; Dragović (yellow card) 53'; Silva (yellow card) 55'; Rybalka (yellow card) 56' (yellow-red card) 90+6'; Vida (yellow card) 73'; Shovkovskyi (red card) 90'; Kravets (yellow card) 90+3'	Summary	Fred (yellow card) 69'; Teixeira (yellow card) 86'; Srna 90+2' (pen.), (yellow card) 90+2'; Bernard 90+4'	Stadium: Chornomorets Stadium; Attendance: 34,164; Referee: Anatoliy Zhabchenko

=== Premier League ===
==== League table ====
Pos	Team	Pld	W	D	L	GF	GA	GD	Pts	Qualification or relegation
1	Dynamo Kyiv (C)	26	23	1	2	54	11	+43	70	Qualification to Champions League group stage
2	Shakhtar Donetsk	26	20	3	3	76	25	+51	63	Qualification to Champions League third qualifying round (Note: Shakhtar Donetsk qualified for the Europa League group stage by winning the 2015–16 Ukrainian Cup. However, since they already qualified for European competition based on their league position, the spot awarded to the cup winners was passed down the league.)
3	Dnipro Dnipropetrovsk (Note: On 31 March 2016, the Adjudicatory Chamber of the UEFA Club Financial Control Body (CFCB) announced that Dnipro Dnipropetrovsk will be excluded from participating in the next UEFA club competition for which they would otherwise qualify in the next three (3) seasons (i.e. the 2016–17, 2017–18 and 2018–19 seasons).)	26	16	5	5	50	22	+28	53	
4	Zorya Luhansk	26	14	6	6	51	26	+25	48	Qualification to Europa League group stage
5	Vorskla Poltava	26	11	9	6	32	26	+6	42	Qualification to Europa League third qualifying round

Source: uafootball.net.ua
Rules for classification: 1) Points; 2) Goal difference; 3) Goals scored; 4) Head-to-head points; 5) Head-to-head goal difference; 6) Head-to-head goals scored; 7) Fairplay ranking; 8) Draw.
(C) Champions

==== Results summary ====
Overall								Home						Away					
Pld	W	D	L	GF	GA	GD	Pts	W	D	L	GF	GA	GD	W	D	L	GF	GA	GD
26	20	3	3	76	25	+51	63	11	0	2	36	7	+29	9	3	1	40	18	+22

==== Results by round ====
Round	1	2	3	4	5	6	7	8	9	10	11	12	13	14	15	16	17	18	19	20	21	22	23	24	25	26
Ground	H	A	H	A	H	H	A	H	A	H	A	A	A	A	H	H	H	A	A	H	A	H	A	H	A	H
Result	W	W	W	D	L	W	W	W	W	W	W	W	W	W	W	W	W	L	W	W	D	W	D	W	W	L
Position	3	1	1	2	3	2	2	2	2	2	1	1	1	1	1	1	1	2	2	2	2	2	2	2	2	2

Updated to match(es) played on 3 December 2015. Source: Socceraway
A = Away; H = Home; W = Win; D = Draw; L = Loss

==== Results ====
19 July 2015 1	Shakhtar Donetsk	2–0	Oleksandriya	Lviv
17:00 EEST (UTC+3)	Teixeira 23', 80'; Malyshev (yellow card) 38'; Kovalenko (yellow card) 72'	Summary	Holenkov (yellow card) 12'; Mykytsey (yellow card) 83'; Banada (yellow card) 88'	Stadium: Arena Lviv; Attendance: 2,634; Referee: Ivan Bondar

23 July 2015 2	Volyn Lutsk	1–4	Shakhtar Donetsk	Lutsk
19:00 EEST (UTC+3)	Matei 43' (pen.); Žunić (yellow card) 60'; Khomchenko (yellow card) 69'	Summary	Taison 25'; Teixeira 39', 54'; Ordets (yellow card) 43'; Eduardo 90+3'	Stadium: Avanhard Stadium; Attendance: 8,180; Referee: Yury Vaks

1 August 2015 3	Shakhtar Donetsk	2–0	Hoverla Uzhhorod	Lviv
19:30 EEST (UTC+3)	Teixeira 50'; Eduardo 74'; Kovalenko (yellow card) 90+2'	Summary	Savchenko (yellow card) 52'; Tsurikov (yellow card) 90'; Jagodinskis (yellow card) 90+3'	Stadium: Arena Lviv; Attendance: 2,400; Referee: Oleksandr Derdo

9 August 2015 4	Vorskla Poltava	2–2	Shakhtar Donetsk	Poltava
19:30 EEST (UTC+3)	Dallku (yellow card) 27'; Barannik 45+1'; Perduta (yellow card) 88'; Kovpak 90+2'	Summary	Kucher (yellow card) 31'; Marlos 39'; Eduardo 65'	Stadium: Oleksiy Butovskyi Vorskla Stadium; Attendance: 8,000; Referee: Anatoliy Abdula

14 August 2015 5	Shakhtar Donetsk	0–2	Dnipro Dnipropetrovsk	Odesa
19:00 EEST (UTC+3)	Shevchuk (yellow card) 14' (yellow-red card) 90+3'; Rakitskiy (yellow card) 57'; Srna (yellow card) 73'; Stepanenko (yellow card) 75'	Summary	Fedorchuk (yellow card) 12'; Douglas (yellow card) 23'; Luchkevych (yellow card) 59'; Matheus 84'; Fedetskyi (yellow card) 90+3'; Seleznyov 90+4'	Stadium: Chornomorets Stadium; Attendance: 13,213; Referee: Anatoliy Zhabchenko

28 August 2015 6	Shakhtar Donetsk	2–0	Metalurh Zaporizhya	Lviv
19:00 EEST (UTC+3)	Malyshev (yellow card) 31'; Teixeira 64' (pen.), 90+2'; Rakitskiy (yellow card) 81'; Srna (red card) 87'	Summary	Kornyev (yellow card) 10'; Tatarkov (yellow card) 25'; Orelesi (yellow card) 35' (yellow-red card) 88'; Gvilia (yellow card) 42'; Kapliyenko (yellow card) 63'; Startsev (yellow card) 90+2'	Stadium: Arena Lviv; Attendance: 3,011; Referee: Mykola Balakin

11 September 2015 7	Metalist Kharkiv	0–5	Shakhtar Donetsk	Kharkiv
21:00 EEST (UTC+3)	Dovhyi (yellow card) 58'; Ryzhuk (red card) 61'; Rudyka (yellow card) 86'	Summary	Rakitskiy 35', (yellow card) 37'; Teixeira 39', 62' (pen.); Kucher 53'; Taison (yellow card) 74'; Hladkyy 81'	Stadium: OSC Metalist; Attendance: 16,855; Referee: Evgen Aranovskiy

19 September 2015 8	Shakhtar Donetsk	2–0	Stal Dniprodzerzhynsk	Lviv
17:00 EEST (UTC+3)	Fred 10'; Teixeira 45+2'	Summary		Stadium: Arena Lviv; Attendance: 1,354; Referee: Kostyantin Trukhanov

26 September 2015 9	Olimpik Donetsk	2–3	Shakhtar Donetsk	Kyiv
14:00 EEST (UTC+3)	Konde (yellow card) 3' (yellow-red card) 77'; Kadymyan 18'; Partsvania (yellow card) 24'; Hryshko (yellow card) 38'; Lysenko (yellow card) 55', (goal) 66'; Postupalenko (yellow card) 67'; Ohirya (yellow card) 85'	Summary	Ordets (red card) 17'; Teixeira 38' (pen.), 90', (yellow card) 90+4'; Bernard (yellow card) 69'; Rakitskiy (yellow card) 76'; Srna 78' (pen.)	Stadium: Bannikov Stadium; Attendance: 1,050; Referee: Ivan Bondar

3 October 2015 10	Shakhtar Donetsk	2–0	Chornomorets Odesa	Lviv
17:00 EEST (UTC+3)	Teixeira 8' (pen.), 49'; Kucher (yellow card) 21'; Stepanenko (yellow card) 60'	Summary	Smyrnov (yellow card) 21'; Danchenko (yellow card) 55'; Filimonov (yellow card) 87'	Stadium: Arena Lviv; Attendance: 3,235; Referee: Yury Grisjo

16 October 2015 11	Dynamo Kyiv	0–3	Shakhtar Donetsk	Kyiv
19:00 EEST (UTC+3)	González (yellow card) 57' (yellow-red card) 89'; Silva (yellow card) 78'; Belhanda (yellow card) 79'; Sydorchuk (yellow card) 90+1'	Summary	Teixeira (yellow card) 3', (goal) 59', 67'; Marlos 40'	Stadium: NSC Olimpiyskiy Stadium; Attendance: 32,794; Referee: Anatoliy Abdula

30 October 2015 13	Zorya Luhansk	1–7	Shakhtar Donetsk	Zaporizhia
19:00 EET (UTC+2)	Kamenyuka 67' (pen.); Sivakov (yellow card) 75'	Summary	Fred 40'; Stepanenko 47', 90', (yellow card) 90'; Teixeira 58', 70'; Eduardo 75', 86'	Stadium: Slavutych-Arena; Attendance: 3,500; Referee: Yury Vaks

7 November 2015 14	Oleksandriya	2–3	Shakhtar Donetsk	Oleksandriia
17:00 EET (UTC+2)	Shendrik (yellow card) 9' (yellow-red card) 31'; Zaporozhan 16' (pen.); Chebotayev (yellow card) 51'; Kolomoyets (yellow card) 57'; Ponomar 90+1'	Summary	Dentinho 14'; Stepanenko (yellow card) 16'; Shevchuk (yellow card) 28'; Hladkyy 43'; Teixeira 54', (yellow card) 90+3' (yellow-red card) 90+3'; Kanibolotskiy (yellow card) 90+1'	Stadium: CSC Nika Stadium; Attendance: 6,500; Referee: Sergiy Boyko

21 November 2015 15	Shakhtar Donetsk	4–0	Volyn Lutsk	Zaporizhia
17:00 EET (UTC+2)	Marlos 19', 38'; Ismaily 32'; Dentinho (yellow card) 55'; Hladkyy 67'; Kucher (yellow card) 90+3'	Summary	Polyovyi (yellow card) 35'; Bohdanov (yellow card) 42'; Humenyuk (yellow card) 90+2'	Stadium: Slavutych-Arena; Attendance: 6,500; Referee: Yaroslav Kozyk

29 November 2015 16	Hoverla Uzhhorod	1–6	Shakhtar Donetsk	Uzhhorod
14:00 EET (UTC+2)	Khlyobas 9'; Tsurikov (yellow card) 85'	Summary	Rakytskyi 9'; Taison 28'; Marlos 30'; Ferreyra 35'; Teixeira 67', 73' (pen.); Eduardo (yellow card) 84'	Stadium: Avanhard Stadium; Attendance: 3,600; Referee: Evgen Aranovskiy

3 December 2015 12	Shakhtar Donetsk	3–0	Karpaty Lviv	Odesa
17:00 EET (UTC+2)	Ferreyra (yellow card) 45'; Eduardo 56'; Ismaily 85'; Teixeira 88'	Summary	Plastun (yellow card) 2'; Hutsulyak (yellow card) 30'; Kravets (yellow card) 55'	Stadium: Chornomorets Stadium; Attendance: 2,837; Referee: Sergiy Berezka

6 March 2016 17	Shakhtar Donetsk	3–1	Vorskla Poltava	Lviv
17:00 EET (UTC+2)	Srna 9'; Taison 49'; Eduardo (yellow card) 68', (goal) 85'	Summary	Dallku (yellow card) 13'; Hromov 36'; Dytyatev (yellow card) 82'	Stadium: Arena Lviv; Attendance: 2,820; Referee: Yuri Mozharovskiy

13 March 2016 18	Dnipro Dnipropetrovsk	4–1	Shakhtar Donetsk	Dnipropetrovsk
19:30 EET (UTC+2)	Ruiz 10', (yellow card) 36'; Zozulya (yellow card) 34', (goal) 50'; Shakhov 44'; Bezus 90' (pen.)	Summary	Malyshev 23', (yellow card) 34'; Wellington Nem (yellow card) 56'; Srna (yellow card) 59'; Rakytskyi (yellow card) 66'	Stadium: Dnipro-Arena; Attendance: 16,066; Referee: Evgen Aranovskiy

19 March 2016 19	Metalurh Zaporizhya	– – +	Shakhtar Donetsk	Zaporizhia
19:30 EET (UTC+2)		Summary		Stadium: Slavutych-Arena

1 April 2016 20	Shakhtar Donetsk	8–1	Metalist Kharkiv	Lviv
17:00 EET (UTC+2)	Taison 6', 54', 57'; Ismaily 27'; Ferreyra 31'; Taison 67'; Eduardo 86'; Bernard 89'	Summary	Kornyev 16'	Stadium: Arena Lviv; Attendance: 2,173; Referee: Yury Grisjo

10 April 2016 21	Stal Dniprodzerzhynsk	3–3	Shakhtar Donetsk	Dnipropetrovsk
17:00 EET (UTC+2)	Fernandez (yellow card) 37'; Kalenchuk 38'; Voronin (yellow card) 45'; Pankiv (yellow card) 57'; Lazić 61'; Latifu (yellow card) 85'; Debelko (yellow card) 90'; Ischenko 90+3'	Summary	Srna (yellow card) 40'; Eduardo 51'; Kovalenko (yellow card) 59'; Rakytskyi (yellow card) 66'; Dentinho 72'; Kucher (yellow card) 74'; Malyshev 79'	Stadium: Meteor Stadium; Attendance: 1,870; Referee: Yaroslav Kozyk

17 April 2016 22	Shakhtar Donetsk	3–0	Olimpik Donetsk	Lviv
17:00 EET (UTC+2)	Wellington Nem 46'; Stepanenko (yellow card) 66'; Marlos 83' (pen.); Eduardo 90'	Summary	Petrov (yellow card) 10'; Hoshkoderya (yellow card) 54'; Postupalenko (yellow card) 65'	Stadium: Arena Lviv; Attendance: 2,788; Referee: Oleksandr Derdo

23 April 2016 23	Chornomorets Odesa	1–1	Shakhtar Donetsk	Odesa
19:30 EET (UTC+2)	Smirnov (yellow card) 30'; Kalytvyntsev 56'; Korkishko (yellow card) 72'; Danchenko (red card) 90'	Summary	Bernard 10', (yellow card) 71'; Dentinho (yellow card) 73'; Ordets (yellow card) 90'	Stadium: Chornomorets Stadium; Attendance: 11,182; Referee: Ihor Paskhal

1 May 2016 24	Shakhtar Donetsk	3–0	Dynamo Kyiv	Lviv
19:30 EET (UTC+2)	Eduardo 33', 78', (yellow card) 69'; Stepanenko (yellow card) 50' (yellow-red card) 81'; Ordets (yellow card) 58'; Kobin (yellow card) 69'; Wellington Nem 73'; Kucher (red card) 81'	Summary	Harmashi (yellow card) 39'; Yarmolenko (yellow card) 42' (red card) 81'; Khacheridi (yellow card) 45'; Rybalka (yellow card) 82'; Vida (yellow card) 82'	Stadium: Arena Lviv; Attendance: 6,497; Referee: Yuri Mozharovskiy

8 May 2016 25	Karpaty Lviv	1–2	Shakhtar Donets	Lviv
19:30 EET (UTC+2)	Daushvili (yellow card) 25'; Leschuk 36', (yellow card) 69'; Plastun (yellow card) 87'	Summary	Kobin (yellow card) 31'; Hitchenko 43' (o.g.); Marlos 88' (pen.)	Stadium: Arena Lviv; Attendance: 4,250; Referee: Mykola Balakin

15 May 2016 26	Shakhtar Donetsk	2–3	Zorya Luhansk	Zaporizhia
19:30 EET (UTC+2)	Ferreyra 32'; Wellington Nem (yellow card) 52'; Hladkyy 74'; Rakytskyi (yellow card) 81'	Summary	Ljubenović (yellow card) 47'; Totovytskyi 56', 61', 82'	Stadium: Slavutych-Arena; Attendance: 6,751; Referee: Kateryna Monzul

=== Ukrainian Cup ===
22 August 2015 Round of 32	Arsenal-Kyiv	0–3	Shakhtar Donetsk	Kyiv
17:00 EEST (UTC+3)	Vasalaty (yellow card) 57'; Kovtalyuk (yellow card) 90'	Summary	Malyshev 23'; Eduardo 41'; Hryn 75'; Dentinho (yellow card) 80'	Stadium: Bannikov Stadium; Attendance: 1,500; Referee: Andriy Kuzmin

23 September 2015 Round of 16	Ternopil	0–5	Shakhtar Donetsk	Ternopil
18:00 EEST (UTC+3)	Kurylo (yellow card) 45'; Kapelyan (yellow card) 66'	Summary	Malyshev 34'; Bernard 47', 61'; Kobin (yellow card) 71'; Boryachuk 76'; Kovalenko 77'; Ordets (yellow card) 86'	Stadium: Ternopilsky Misky Stadion; Attendance: 15,500; Referee: Yuriy Foschyi

28 October 2015 Round of 16	Shakhtar Donetsk	4–0 (9–0 agg.)	Ternopil	Kyiv
14:00 EET (UTC+2)	Ferreyra 5' (pen.); Kobin 33'; Boryachuk 67'; Wellington Nem (yellow card) 78'; Taison 89' (pen.)	Summary	Bohdanov (yellow card) 4'; Kondzelka (yellow card) 18'; Klekot (yellow card) 48'; Kurylo (yellow card) 89'	Stadium: Obolon Arena; Attendance: 1,200; Referee: Denys Shurman

2 March 2016 Quarterfinal 1st Leg	Vorskla Poltava	0–4	Shakhtar Donetsk	Poltava
19:30 EET (UTC+2)	Tkachuk (yellow card) 27'; Dytyatev (yellow card) 45' (yellow-red card) 60'	Summary	Kovalenko 4'; Marlos (yellow card) 29'; Ferreyra 55'; Kucher 58'; Wellington Nem 80'	Stadium: Oleksiy Butovskyi Vorskla Stadium; Attendance: 7,000; Referee: Anatoliy Abdula

27 March 2016 Quarterfinal 2nd Leg	Shakhtar Donetsk	1–2 (5–2 agg.)	Vorskla Poltava	Kyiv
17:00 EEST (UTC+3)	Ordets (yellow card) 47'; Bernard 67' (pen.)	Summary	Khlyobas 28', 88'; Siminin (yellow card) 45'; Sklyar (yellow card) 46'; Dovhyi (yellow card) 59'; Sapay (yellow card) 72'; Kolomoyets (yellow card) 86'	Stadium: Obolon Arena; Attendance: 2,182; Referee: Yury Vaks

20 April 2016 Semifinal 1st Leg	Oleksandriya	1–1	Shakhtar Donetsk	Oleksandriia
19:00 EET (UTC+2)	Polyarus (yellow card) 15'; Hrytsuk 36'; Shendrik (yellow card) 78'; Dedechko (yellow card) 78'	Summary	Ferreyra (yellow card) 23'; Eduardo 54'; Kryvtsov (yellow card) 60'	Stadium: CSC Nika Stadium; Attendance: 6,735; Referee: Anatoliy Zhabchenko

11 May 2016 Semifinal 2nd Leg	Shakhtar Donetsk	2–0 (3–1 agg.)	Oleksandriya	Lviv
19:30 EET (UTC+2)	Malyshev 15'; Stepanenko (yellow card) 21'; Ordets (yellow card) 55'; Rakytskyi (yellow card) 90'; Wellington Nem 90'	Summary	Kozak (yellow card) 22'	Stadium: Arena Lviv; Attendance: 1,750; Referee: Kostyantin Trukhanov

21 May 2016 Final	Zorya Luhansk	0–2	Shakhtar Donetsk	Lviv
17:00 EEST (UTC+3)	Forster (yellow card) 12'; Sivakov (yellow card) 64'; Chaykovskyi (yellow card) 64'; Yarmash (yellow card) 70'	Report	Hladkyy 42', 57'	Stadium: Arena Lviv; Attendance: 21,723; Referee: Evgen Aranovskiy

=== UEFA Champions League ===
==== Qualifying round ====
28 July 2015 Third qualifying round 1st leg	Fenerbahçe (Turkey)	0–0	(Ukraine) Shakhtar Donetsk	Istanbul, Turkey
21:00 EEST (UTC+3)	Alves (yellow card) 3'; Stoch (yellow card) 84'	Report		Stadium: Şükrü Saracoğlu Stadium; Attendance: 50,509; Referee: Jorge Sousa (Portugal)

5 August 2015 Third qualifying round 2nd leg	Shakhtar Donetsk (Ukraine)	3–0 (3–0 agg.)	(Turkey) Fenerbahçe	Lviv, Ukraine
21:45 EEST (UTC+3)	Shevchuk (yellow card) 19'; Hladkyy 25'; Srna 65' (pen.); Teixeira 68'	Report	Nani (yellow card) 25'; Özbayraklı (yellow card) 27'; Demirel (yellow card) 64'; Kjær (yellow card) 84' (yellow-red card) 90+3'	Stadium: Arena Lviv; Attendance: 33,178; Referee: Felix Zwayer (Germany)

19 August 2015 Playoff round 1st leg	Rapid Wien (Austria)	0–1	(Ukraine) Shakhtar Donetsk	Vienna, Austria
21:45 EEST (UTC+3)	Berić (yellow card) 8'; Auer (yellow card) 26'; Dibon (yellow card) 30'; Kainz (yellow card) 59'	Report	Marlos 44'; Stepanenko (yellow card) 38'; Srna (yellow card) 38'; Hladkyy (yellow card) 40'; Fred (yellow card) 66'	Stadium: Ernst-Happel-Stadion; Attendance: 46,400; Referee: Björn Kuipers (Netherlands)

25 August 2015 Playoff Round 2nd leg	Shakhtar Donetsk (Ukraine)	2–2 (3–2 agg.)	(Austria) Rapid Wien	Lviv, Ukraine
21:45 EEST (UTC+3)	Marlos 10', (yellow card) 68'; Hladkyy 27', (yellow card) 61'; Fred (yellow card) 45'; Srna (yellow card) 82'	Report	Schaub 13'; Hofmann 22'; Sonnleitner (yellow card) 59' (yellow-red card) 88'; Dibon (yellow card) 68'	Stadium: Arena Lviv; Attendance: 28,417; Referee: Szymon Marciniak (Poland)

==== Group stage ====
Pos	Team	Pld	W	D	L	GF	GA	GD	Pts	Qualification
1	(Spain) Real Madrid	6	5	1	0	19	3	+16	16	Advance to knockout phase
2	(France) Paris Saint-Germain	6	4	1	1	12	1	+11	13	Advance to knockout phase
3	(Ukraine) Shakhtar Donetsk	6	1	0	5	7	14	−7	3	Transfer to Europa League
4	(Sweden) Malmö FF	6	1	0	5	1	21	−20	3	

Source: UEFA
Rules for classification: Group stage tiebreakers

15 September 2015 1	Real Madrid (Spain)	4–0	(Ukraine) Shakhtar Donetsk	Madrid, Spain
21:45 EEST (UTC+3)	Benzema 30'; Ronaldo 55' (pen.), 63' (pen.), 81'	Report	Stepanenko (yellow card) 32' (yellow-red card) 50'; Srna (yellow card) 55'; Kucher (yellow card) 75'; Malyshev (yellow card) 80'	Stadium: Santiago Bernabéu; Attendance: 66,389; Referee: Ivan Bebek (Croatia)

30 September 2015 2	Shakhtar Donetsk (Ukraine)	0–3	(France) Paris Saint-Germain	Lviv, Ukraine
21:45 EEST (UTC+3)		Report	Aurier 7'; David Luiz 23', (yellow card) 86'; Ibrahimović (yellow card) 65'; Silva (yellow card) 89'; Srna 90' (o.g.)	Stadium: Arena Lviv; Attendance: 32,730; Referee: Deniz Aytekin (Germany)

21 October 2015 3	Malmö FF (Sweden)	1–0	(Ukraine) Shakhtar Donetsk	Malmö, Sweden
21:45 EEST (UTC+3)	Rosenberg 17', (yellow card) 79'; Lewicki (yellow card) 33'; Bengtsson (yellow card) 42'	Report	Rakitskiy (yellow card) 50'; Kucher (yellow card) 53'; Srna (yellow card) 55'; Fred (yellow card) 66'	Stadium: Swedbank Stadion; Attendance: 20,500; Referee: Anastasios Sidiropoulos (Greece)

3 November 2015 4	Shakhtar Donetsk (Ukraine)	4–0	(Sweden) Malmö FF	Lviv, Ukraine
21:45 EET (UTC+2)	Hladkyy 29'; Srna 48' (pen.), (yellow card) 68'; Eduardo 55'; Stepanenko (yellow card) 61'; Teixeira 73', (yellow card) 90+1'; Kucher (yellow card) 88'	Report	Árnason (yellow card) 47' (yellow-red card) 89'; Yotún (yellow card) 47'	Stadium: Arena Lviv; Attendance: 23,712; Referee: Ovidiu Hațegan (Romania)

25 November 2015 5	Shakhtar Donetsk (Ukraine)	3–4	(Spain) Real Madrid	Lviv, Ukraine
21:45 EET (UTC+2)	Stepanenko (yellow card) 35'; Teixeira 77' (pen.), 88'; Dentinho 83'	Report	Ronaldo 18', 70'; Carvajal (yellow card) 48', (goal) 52'; Modrić 50'; Danilo (yellow card) 87'	Stadium: Arena Lviv; Attendance: 33,990; Referee: Bas Nijhuis (Netherlands)

8 December 2015 6	Paris Saint-Germain (France)	2–0	(Ukraine) Shakhtar Donetsk	Paris, France
21:45 EET (UTC+2)	Lavezzi (yellow card) 39'; Lucas 57'; Ibrahimović 86'	Report	Srna (yellow card) 62'; Ismaily (yellow card) 81'; Rakytskyi (yellow card) 84'	Stadium: Parc de Princes; Attendance: 44,408; Referee: Anthony Taylor (England)

=== UEFA Europa League ===
==== Knockout phase ====
18 February 2016 Last 32 First Leg	Shakhtar Donetsk (Ukraine)	0–0	(Germany) Schalke 04	Lviv, Ukraine
22:05 EET (UTC+2)	Kucher (yellow card) 79' (yellow-red card) 86'; Hladkyy (yellow card) 84'	Summary	Sané (yellow card) 77'	Stadium: Arena Lviv; Attendance: 23,615; Referee: Hüseyin Göçek (Turkey)

25 February 2016 Last 32 Second Leg	Schalke 04 (Germany)	0–3 (0–3 agg.)	(Ukraine) Shakhtar Donetsk	Gelsenkirchen, Germany
20:00 EET (UTC+2)	Goretzka (yellow card) 35'	Report	Ismaily (yellow card) 2'; Marlos 27', (yellow card) 53'; Stepanenko (yellow card) 32'; Taison (yellow card) 43'; Ferreyra 63'; Kovalenko 77'	Stadium: Veltins-Arena; Attendance: 45,308; Referee: Matej Jug (Slovenia)

10 March 2016 Last 16 First Leg	Shakhtar Donetsk (Ukraine)	3–1	(Belgium) Anderlecht	Lviv, Ukraine
20:00 EET (UTC+2)	Taison 21'; Kucher 24'; Eduardo 79'	Summary	Badji (yellow card) 54'; Acheampong 69'; Mbodj (yellow card) 87'	Stadium: Arena Lviv; Attendance: 23,621; Referee: Artur Soares Dias (Portugal)

17 March 2016 Last 16 Second Leg	Anderlecht (Belgium)	0–1 (4–1 agg.)	(Ukraine) Shakhtar Donetsk	Anderlecht, Belgium
22:05 EET (UTC+2)	Nuytinck (yellow card) 12'; Defour (yellow card) 21'; Deschacht (yellow card) 46'; Ezekiel (yellow card) 65'; Mbodj (red card) 86'	Summary	Marlos (yellow card) 15'; Kucher (yellow card) 36' (yellow-red card) 84'; Stepanenko (yellow card) 81'; Eduardo 90+1'	Stadium: Constant Vanden Stock Stadium; Attendance: 13,785; Referee: Antonio Mateu Lahoz (Spain)

7 April 2016 Quarterfinal First Leg	Braga (Portugal)	1–2	(Ukraine) Shakhtar Donetsk	Braga, Portugal
22:05 EET (UTC+2)	Rafa (yellow card) 83'; Eduardo 89'	Summary	Rakitskiy 45', (yellow card) 70'; Ferreyra 75'	Stadium: Estádio Municipal, Braga; Attendance: 21,645; Referee: Jonas Eriksson (Sweden)

14 April 2016 Quarterfinal Second Leg	Shakhtar Donetsk (Ukraine)	4–0 (6–1 agg.)	(Portugal) Braga	Lviv, Ukraine
22:05 EET (UTC+2)	Srna 25' (pen.); Ferreira 43', 73' (o.g.); Kovalenko 50'	Summary	Boly (yellow card) 15'; Matheus (yellow card) 24'; Luíz Carlos (yellow card) 55'	Stadium: Arena Lviv; Attendance: 33,617; Referee: Pavel Královec (Czech Republic)

28 April 2016 Semifinal 1st Leg	Shakhtar Donetsk (Ukraine)	2–2	(Spain) Sevilla	Lviv
22:05 EEST (UTC+3)	Marlos 23'; Stepanenko 36'; Malyshev (yellow card) 89'; Srna (yellow card) 90+5'	Summary	Vitolo 6'; Escudero (yellow card) 27'; Carriço (yellow card) 40'; Krychowiak (yellow card) 48'; Gameiro 82' (pen.)	Stadium: Arena Lviv; Attendance: 34,267; Referee: Szymon Marciniak (Poland)

5 May 2016 Semifinal 2nd Leg	Sevilla (Spain)	3–1 (5–3 agg.)	(Ukraine) Shakhtar Donetsk	Seville, Spain
22:05 EET (UTC+2)	Gameiro 9', 47'; Banega (yellow card) 30'; Mariano 59'; Vitolo (yellow card) 87'	Summary	Marlos (yellow card) 12'; Rakytskyi (yellow card) 15'; Kucher (yellow card) 20'; Eduardo 44' (yellow card) 61'; Srna (yellow card) 48'; Stepanenko (yellow card) 76'; Ismaily (yellow card) 90'	Stadium: Ramón Sánchez Pizjuán, Seville; Attendance: 41,269; Referee: Björn Kuipers (Netherlands)

== Squad statistics ==
As of match played 21 May 2016

=== Appearances and goals ===
No.	Pos	Nat	Player	Total		Premier League		Ukrainian Cup		UEFA Champions League		UEFA Europa League		Supercup	
No.	Pos	Nat	Player	Apps	Goals	Apps	Goals	Apps	Goals	Apps	Goals	Apps	Goals	Apps	Goals
5	DF	(Ukraine) UKR	Oleksandr Kucher	28	3	10+1	1	3	1	6+1	0	6	1	1	0
6	MF	(Ukraine) UKR	Taras Stepanenko	40	3	18	2	3+2	0	9	0	7	1	1	0
7	MF	(Brazil) BRA	Wellington Nem	20	4	5+4	2	2+4	2	0	0	0+5	0	0	0
8	MF	(Brazil) BRA	Fred	23	2	12	2	0	0	10	0	0	0	1	0
9	FW	(Brazil) BRA	Dentinho	28	3	8+6	2	5	0	0+3	1	0+5	0	0+1	0
10	MF	(Brazil) BRA	Bernard	39	6	15+6	2	3+1	3	3+5	0	0+5	0	0+1	1
11	MF	(Brazil) BRA	Marlos	48	12	17+7	8	4+1	0	10	2	8	2	1	0
13	DF	(Ukraine) UKR	Vyacheslav Shevchuk	14	0	9	0	2	0	3	0	0	0	0	0
14	MF	(Ukraine) UKR	Vasyl Kobin	11	1	6	0	4	1	1	0	0	0	0	0
16	MF	(Ukraine) UKR	Vitaliy Vitsenets	0	0	0	0	0	0	0	0	0	0	0	0
17	MF	(Ukraine) UKR	Maksym Malyshev	34	5	13+2	2	7	3	1+3	0	8	0	0	0
18	DF	(Ukraine) UKR	Ivan Ordets	27	0	15+1	0	5	0	3	0	2+1	0	0	0
19	FW	(Argentina) ARG	Facundo Ferreyra	23	7	8+3	3	3+2	2	0+1	0	6	2	0	0
20	MF	(Georgia (country)) GEO	Giorgi Arabidze	3	0	0+2	0	1	0	0	0	0	0	0	0
21	FW	(Ukraine) UKR	Oleksandr Hladkyi	31	9	13+4	4	2+1	2	9	3	1	0	1	0
22	FW	(Croatia) CRO	Eduardo	41	18	6+13	12	3+4	2	1+6	1	2+6	3	0	0
23	GK	(Ukraine) UKR	Bohdan Sarnavskyi	5	0	2	0	3	0	0	0	0	0	0	0
25	DF	(Ukraine) UKR	Mykola Matviyenko	6	0	1+1	0	2+2	0	0	0	0	0	0	0
28	MF	(Brazil) BRA	Taison	42	8	9+9	6	6	1	7+2	0	8	1	1	0
30	GK	(Ukraine) UKR	Andriy Pyatov	32	0	14	0	2	0	8	0	8	0	0	0
31	DF	(Brazil) BRA	Ismaily	27	3	10	3	6	0	2	0	8	0	1	0
32	GK	(Ukraine) UKR	Anton Kanibolotskyi	15	0	9	0	3	0	2	0	0	0	1	0
33	DF	(Croatia) CRO	Darijo Srna	41	6	19	2	4	0	9	2	8	1	1	1
38	DF	(Ukraine) UKR	Serhiy Kryvtsov	14	0	7	0	4	0	1	0	1+1	0	0	0
41	FW	(Ukraine) UKR	Andriy Boryachuk	3	2	0	0	0+2	2	0	0	0+1	0	0	0
44	DF	(Ukraine) UKR	Yaroslav Rakitskyi	38	3	17+1	2	2	0	10	0	7	1	1	0
58	MF	(Ukraine) UKR	Andriy Korobenko	3	0	0+1	0	0+2	0	0	0	0	0	0	0
59	FW	(Ukraine) UKR	Oleksandr Zubkov	2	0	0+1	0	1	0	0	0	0	0	0	0
66	DF	(Brazil) BRA	Márcio Azevedo	11	0	6	0	0	0	5	0	0	0	0	0
74	MF	(Ukraine) UKR	Viktor Kovalenko	46	4	11+12	0	7	2	0+7	0	8	2	0+1	0
Players who left Shakhtar Donetsk during the season:
24	MF	(Ukraine) UKR	Serhiy Hryn	1	1	0	0	1	1	0	0	0	0	0	0
29	MF	(Brazil) BRA	Alex Teixeira	26	26	15	22	0	0	10	4	0	0	1	0

=== Goalscorers ===
Place	Position	Nation	Number	Name	Premier League	Ukrainian Cup	Champions League	Europa League	Super Cup	Total
1	MF	(Brazil)	29	Alex Teixeira	22	0	4	0	0	26
2	FW	(Croatia)	22	Eduardo	12	2	1	3	0	18
3	MF	(Brazil)	11	Marlos	8	0	2	2	0	12
4	FW	(Ukraine)	21	Oleksandr Hladkyi	4	2	3	0	0	9
5	MF	(Brazil)	28	Taison	6	1	0	1	0	8
6	FW	(Argentina)	19	Facundo Ferreyra	3	2	0	2	0	7
7	DF	(Croatia)	33	Darijo Srna	2	0	2	1	1	6
7	MF	(Brazil)	10	Bernard	2	3	0	0	1	6
9	MF	(Ukraine)	17	Maksym Malyshev	2	3	0	0	0	5
10	MF	(Ukraine)	74	Viktor Kovalenko	0	2	0	2	0	4
10	MF	(Brazil)	7	Wellington Nem	2	2	0	0	0	4
12	DF	(Ukraine)	5	Oleksandr Kucher	1	1	0	1	0	3
12	DF	(Brazil)	31	Ismaily	3	0	0	0	0	3
12	DF	(Ukraine)	44	Yaroslav Rakitskyi	2	0	0	1	0	3
12	FW	(Brazil)	9	Dentinho	2	0	1	0	0	3
12	MF	(Ukraine)	6	Taras Stepanenko	2	0	0	1	0	3
12				Own goal	1	0	0	2	0	3
18	FW	(Ukraine)	41	Andriy Boryachuk	0	2	0	0	0	2
18	MF	(Brazil)	8	Fred	2	0	0	0	0	2
20	MF	(Ukraine)	24	Serhiy Hryn	0	1	0	0	0	1
20	MF	(Ukraine)	14	Vasyl Kobin	0	1	0	0	0	1
TOTALS					76	22	13	16	2	129

=== Clean sheets ===
Place	Position	Nation	Number	Name	Premier League	Ukrainian Cup	Champions League	Europa League	Super Cup	Total
1	GK	(Ukraine)	30	Andriy Pyatov	5	1	3	4	0	13
2	GK	(Ukraine)	32	Anton Kanibolotskyi	4	3	1	0	1	9
3	GK	(Ukraine)	23	Bohdan Sarnavskyi	2	2	0	0	0	4
				TOTALS	11	6	4	4	1	26

=== Disciplinary record ===
Number	Nation	Position	Name	Premier League		Ukrainian Cup		Champions League		Europa League		Super Cup		Total	
Number	Nation	Position	Name	Yellow card	Red card	Yellow card	Red card	Yellow card	Red card	Yellow card	Red card	Yellow card	Red card	Yellow card	Red card
5	(Ukraine)	DF	Oleksandr Kucher	4	1	0	0	3	0	5	2	0	0	12	3
6	(Ukraine)	MF	Taras Stepanenko	7	1	1	0	5	1	3	0	0	0	16	2
7	(Brazil)	MF	Wellington Nem	2	0	1	0	0	0	0	0	0	0	3	0
8	(Brazil)	MF	Fred	0	0	0	0	3	0	0	0	1	0	4	0
9	(Brazil)	FW	Dentinho	2	0	1	0	0	0	0	0	0	0	3	0
10	(Brazil)	MF	Bernard	2	0	0	0	0	0	0	0	0	0	2	0
11	(Brazil)	MF	Marlos	0	0	1	0	1	0	3	0	0	0	5	0
13	(Ukraine)	DF	Vyacheslav Shevchuk	3	1	0	0	1	0	0	0	0	0	4	1
14	(Ukraine)	MF	Kobin	2	0	1	0	0	0	0	0	0	0	3	0
16	(Ukraine)	MF	Vitaliy Vitsenets	0	0	0	0	0	0	0	0	0	0	0	0
17	(Ukraine)	MF	Maksym Malyshev	3	0	0	0	1	0	1	0	0	0	5	0
18	(Ukraine)	DF	Ivan Ordets	3	1	3	0	0	0	0	0	0	0	6	1
19	(Argentina)	FW	Facundo Ferreyra	1	0	1	0	0	0	0	0	0	0	2	0
21	(Ukraine)	FW	Oleksandr Hladkyi	0	0	0	0	2	0	1	0	0	0	3	0
22	(Croatia)	FW	Eduardo	3	0	0	0	0	0	1	0	0	0	4	0
28	(Brazil)	MF	Taison	1	0	0	0	0	0	1	0	0	0	2	0
29	(Brazil)	MF	Alex Teixeira	4	1	0	0	1	0	0	0	1	0	6	1
31	(Brazil)	DF	Ismaily	0	0	0	0	1	0	2	0	0	0	3	0
32	(Ukraine)	GK	Anton Kanibolotskiy	1	0	0	0	0	0	0	0	0	0	1	0
33	(Croatia)	DF	Darijo Srna	3	1	0	0	6	0	2	0	1	0	12	1
38	(Ukraine)	DF	Serhiy Kryvtsov	0	0	1	0	0	0	0	0	0	0	1	0
44	(Ukraine)	DF	Yaroslav Rakitskyi	7	0	1	0	1	0	2	0	0	0	12	0
74	(Ukraine)	MF	Viktor Kovalenko	3	0	0	0	0	0	0	0	0	0	3	0
			TOTALS	51	6	11	0	26	1	21	2	3	0	112	9

== Notes ==
4. Shakhtar Donetsk play their home matches at Arena Lviv, Lviv instead of their regular stadium, Donbas Arena, Donetsk, due to the War in Donbas.
