= 2015 Ukrainian Super Cup =

Dynamo Kyiv	Shakhtar Donetsk
0	2
- Date: 14 July 2015
- Venue: Chornomorets Stadium, Odesa
- Referee: Anatoliy Zhabchenko
- Attendance: 34,164

The 2015 Ukrainian Super Cup became the twelfth edition of Ukrainian Super Cup, an annual football match contested by the winners of the previous season's Ukrainian Top League and Ukrainian Cup competitions.

The match was played at the Chornomorets Stadium, Odesa, on 14 July 2015 and contested by league and cup winner Dynamo Kyiv and league runner-up Shakhtar Donetsk. Shakhtar won it 2–0.

After ejection of Oleksandr Shovkovskyi on 90th minute, his post took over by defender Aleksandar Dragović.

== Match ==
=== Details ===
14 July 2015

Dynamo Kyiv	0–2	Shakhtar Donetsk
	Report	Darijo Srna 90+2' (pen.); Taison 90+4'

Chornomorets Stadium, Odesa
Attendance: 34,164
Referee: Anatoliy Zhabchenko

Dynamo Kyiv	Shakhtar Donetsk

GK	1	(Ukraine) Oleksandr Shovkovskyi (c)	(red card) 90+1'
DF	24	(Croatia) Domagoj Vida	(yellow card) 73'
DF	2	(Brazil) Danilo Silva	(yellow card) 55'
DF	6	(Austria) Aleksandar Dragović	(yellow card) 53'
DF	5	(Portugal) Vitorino Antunes
MF	10	(Ukraine) Andriy Yarmolenko
MF	9	(Ukraine) Mykola Morozyuk		(substituted off) 67'
MF	17	(Ukraine) Serhiy Rybalka	(yellow card) 56' (yellow-red card) 90+4'
MF	16	(Ukraine) Serhiy Sydorchuk	(yellow card) 27'	(substituted off) 82'
MF	4	(Portugal) Miguel Veloso
FW	11	(Brazil) Júnior Moraes		(substituted off) 78'
Substitutes:
GK	23	(Ukraine) Oleksandr Rybka
MF	8	(Serbia) Radosav Petrović
MF	19	(Ukraine) Denys Harmash		(substituted in) 82'
MF	20	(Ukraine) Oleh Husyev		(substituted in) 67'
FW	22	(Ukraine) Artem Kravets	(yellow card) 90+3'	(substituted in) 78'
DF	26	(Ukraine) Mykyta Burda
MF	29	(Ukraine) Vitaliy Buyalskyi
Manager :
	(Ukraine) Serhii Rebrov

GK	32	(Ukraine) Anton Kanibolotskiy
DF	33	(Croatia) Darijo Srna (c)	90+2' (yellow card) 90+2'
DF	44	(Ukraine) Yaroslav Rakitskyi
DF	5	(Ukraine) Oleksandr Kucher
DF	31	(Brazil) Ismaily
MF	6	(Ukraine) Taras Stepanenko
MF	7	(Brazil) Fred	(yellow card) 69'	(substituted off) 87'
MF	28	(Brazil) Taison		(substituted off) 63'
MF	11	(Brazil) Marlos		(substituted off) 76'
MF	29	(Brazil) Alex Teixeira	(yellow card) 86'
FW	21	(Ukraine) Oleksandr Hladkyi
Substitutes:
GK	30	(Ukraine) Andriy Pyatov
DF	18	(Ukraine) Ivan Ordets
MF	74	(Ukraine) Viktor Kovalenko		(substituted in) 87'
MF	10	(Brazil) Bernard	90+4'	(substituted in) 63'
MF	9	(Brazil) Dentinho		(substituted in) 76'
FW	22	(Croatia) Eduardo
MF	17	(Ukraine) Maksym Malyshev
Manager :
	(Romania) Mircea Lucescu
