= Zhabchenko =

Zhabchenko (Ukrainian: Жабченко) is a Ukrainian surname. Notable people with the surname include:

- Anatoliy Zhabchenko (born 1979), Ukrainian football referee
- Ihor Zhabchenko (born 1968), Ukrainian football coach
