= Eduardo (footballer, born 1983) =

Croatian footballer (born 1983)

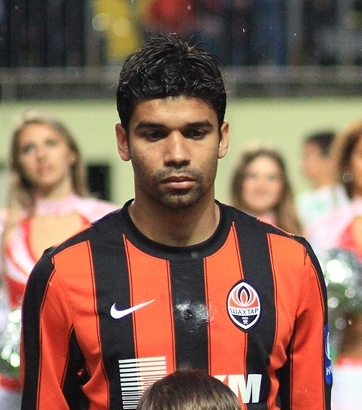
- Eduardo with Shakhtar Donetsk in May 2011

Personal information
- Full name: Eduardo Alves da Silva
- Date of birth: 25 February 1983 (age 43)
- Place of birth: Rio de Janeiro, Brazil
- Height: 1.78 m (5 ft 10 in)
- Position: Striker

Youth career
- –1996: CBF Nova Kennedy
- 1996–1998: Bangu
- 1999–2001: Dinamo Zagreb

Senior career*
Years	Team	Apps	(Gls)
2001–2007	Dinamo Zagreb	109	(73)
2001	→ Croatia Sesvete (loan)	5	(2)
2003	→ Inter Zaprešić (loan)	15	(10)
2007–2010	Arsenal	41	(7)
2010–2014	Shakhtar Donetsk	81	(24)
2014–2015	Flamengo	27	(10)
2015–2016	Shakhtar Donetsk	29	(14)
2017	Atlético Paranaense	2	(0)
2018	Legia Warsaw	11	(0)
Total		320	(140)

International career
2004–2005	Croatia U21	12	(8)
2004–2014	Croatia	64	(29)
- * Club domestic league appearances and goals

Eduardo Alves da Silva (Brazilian Portuguese: [eduˈaʁdu dɐ ˈsiwvɐ], Croatian: [eduâːrdo da sǐlva]; born 25 February 1983), known as simply Eduardo or Dudu, is a former professional footballer who played as a striker for multiple clubs and the Croatia national team.

He began his career with his hometown club in Brazil, Bangu Atlético Clube. He later joined Dinamo Zagreb's youth team. He spent a period on loan at Inter Zaprešić, scoring ten goals in 15 matches. His prolific scoring at Dinamo Zagreb, where he scored 73 times in 109 league appearances, attracted the interest of Arsenal who signed him for a fee of £7.5 million in 2007. A serious leg injury hampered his time with Arsenal and, after three seasons with the club, he moved to Shakhtar Donetsk in 2010.

Eduardo took up Croatian citizenship in 2002 and made his international debut for the Croatia national team as a second-half substitute in a friendly match against Ireland on 16 November 2004 at the age of 21. He was selected by the national team's coach Slaven Bilić for the UEFA Euro 2012 tournament and again by Niko Kovač for the 2014 FIFA World Cup. With 29 goals scored for Croatia, Eduardo is the country's sixth highest goalscorer on record.

== Club career ==
=== Early career ===
Eduardo grew up in the Rio de Janeiro neighbourhood of Bangu and made his first steps in club football with CBF Nova Kennedy and Bangu Atlético Clube, although he did not play regularly in the youth categories. He was later noticed by Dinamo Zagreb's scouts and joined the club's youth squad in September 1999. Eduardo stayed at Dinamo on trial until December 1999 and returned to the club in February 2000, starting to play regularly for their under-17 squad. Eduardo found his way to the first team in the summer of 2001, despite suffering some injuries early in his career.

After making his first-team debut with Dinamo in the 2001–02 season, Eduardo was loaned for one season to Croatian second division side Inker Zaprešić (now Inter Zaprešić) in 2002–03 to see more first-team action, scoring ten goals in 15 league appearances for the club.

=== Dinamo Zagreb ===
Coming back from loan at Inter Zaprešić for the 2003–04 season, Eduardo quickly established himself as a regular in Dinamo Zagreb's first team. He was subsequently named the best player of the Croatian league in 2004 as well as in 2006 and 2007, when he was one of the key players in Dinamo Zagreb's team that won two consecutive titles in the Croatian league as well as one title in the Croatian Cup. In 2006, he also helped Dinamo winning the Croatian Supercup, scoring two goals in their 4–1 victory over Rijeka.

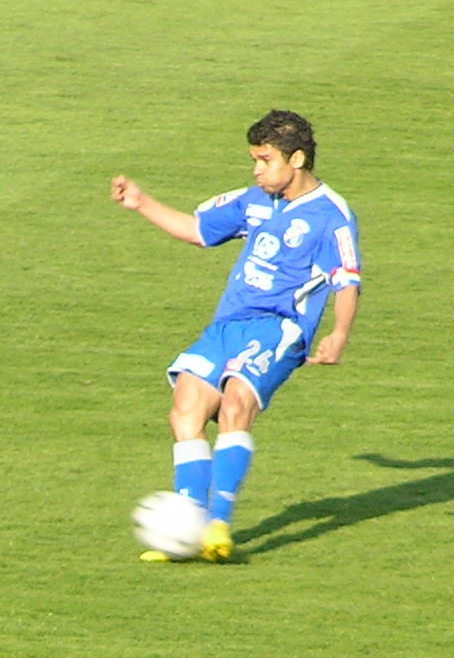
Eduardo taking a free kick for Dinamo in April 2007

In the 2006–07 season, he scored five goals in six matches for Dinamo Zagreb in two qualifying rounds for the Champions League and in the first round of the UEFA Cup. After netting a brace in Dinamo Zagreb's 4–1 away win at Ekranas, he went on to score the first European goal at Arsenal's new Emirates Stadium in London on 23 August 2006 as Dinamo Zagreb suffered a 5–1 aggregate defeat in the third qualifying round for the Champions League. He also scored both goals in Dinamo's 5–2 aggregate defeat to Auxerre in the first round of the UEFA Cup on 14 September 2006.

Eduardo performed best for Dinamo Zagreb in the Croatian championship, netting 18 goals in 18 matches until the winter break of the 2006–07 season, including three braces and a hat-trick, and adding another seven assists to his tally. In addition to this, he was the only player who appeared in all of the club's 18 matches before the winter break, also being in the starting lineup in each of the 18 matches. In mid-November 2006, he scored two hat-tricks in two consecutive matches he played for Croatia and Dinamo Zagreb in a period of four days.

In Dinamo's 4–0 derby win over Zagreb on 12 May 2007, Eduardo scored his 30th and 31st league goals of the 2006–07 season and became the most successful Croatian league goalscorer of all time, breaking a 13-year-old record set by former Dinamo Zagreb striker Goran Vlaović with 29 goals scored for the club in the 1993–94 season. He finished the league season with 34 goals in 32 appearances. In the final league match of the season on 19 May 2007, he became the first player ever to score a hat-trick in the Eternal derby between Dinamo Zagreb and Hajduk Split, netting all three goals as Dinamo won the match 3–0.

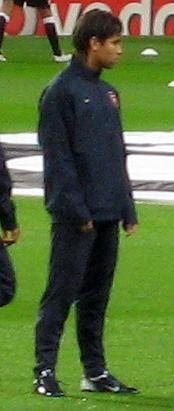
Eduardo training with Arsenal in September 2007

=== Arsenal ===
On 3 July 2007, Arsenal confirmed that terms had been agreed with Dinamo Zagreb for the transfer of Eduardo for an undisclosed fee, believed to be around £7.5 million, subject to receiving a work permit. The initial work permit application was turned down by the Home Office, but the appeal hearing on 2 August reversed the decision.

Eduardo made his Premier League debut on 19 August 2007 in Arsenal's 1–1 draw at Blackburn Rovers. Ten days later, he netted his first competitive goal for the Gunners in their Champions League qualifier against Sparta Prague, which Arsenal won 3–0. Eduardo scored his first group-stage goal in the Champions League on 19 September 2007 against Sevilla. While still fighting to find his place as a regular in the Premier League for Arsenal, Eduardo continued to display his goalscoring abilities in the League Cup, scoring two braces in two consecutive matches for the club, against Sheffield United and Blackburn Rovers, and helping them to reach the semi-finals of the competition. Eduardo found more playing time in all competitions due to Robin van Persie's lengthy injury and found himself partnering Emmanuel Adebayor more often.

Eduardo finally managed to establish his place in Arsenal's starting line-up in the Premier League over Christmas and New Year period, scoring his first two Premier League goals in a 4–1 win at Everton on 29 December 2007, first leveling the score and then putting Arsenal 2–1 up in the opening 15 minutes of the second half. On New Year's Day 2008, he opened the scoring after only 72 seconds of the match against West Ham United; Arsenal went on to win 2–0. On the first weekend of the new year, he had a successful FA Cup debut as Arsenal faced Championship side Burnley on the road, first scoring the opening goal early on, and then setting up a second for Nicklas Bendtner midway through the second half. In the following three matches in January, he set up three more goals, providing two assists and winning a penalty. He went on to help Arsenal to return to the top of the Premier League in early February, scoring a skillful over-the-shoulder flick in a 3–1 away victory over Manchester City and assisting Philippe Senderos for an early goal in a 2–0 win over Blackburn Rovers at the Emirates.

==== Leg injury ====
On 23 February 2008, Eduardo suffered a broken left fibula and an open dislocation of his left ankle in a match against Birmingham City, following a tackle by Martin Taylor, for which Taylor was sent off. Eduardo was immediately taken to Selly Oak Hospital, where he underwent surgery. Gilberto Silva was the only person in the vicinity who spoke both Portuguese and English and was able to translate communication between Eduardo and the medical team. Eduardo's injury was so graphic that Sky Sports, which was broadcasting the game live, decided not to show replays of the incident. Arsène Wenger initially called for a lifetime ban for Taylor, but retracted his comments later. Taylor claimed to have visited Eduardo in hospital and that an apology was accepted; Eduardo, however, could not remember Taylor's visit or even the tackle. Some cite the incident as a cause of Arsenal failing to maintain their lead in the Premier League title race that season.

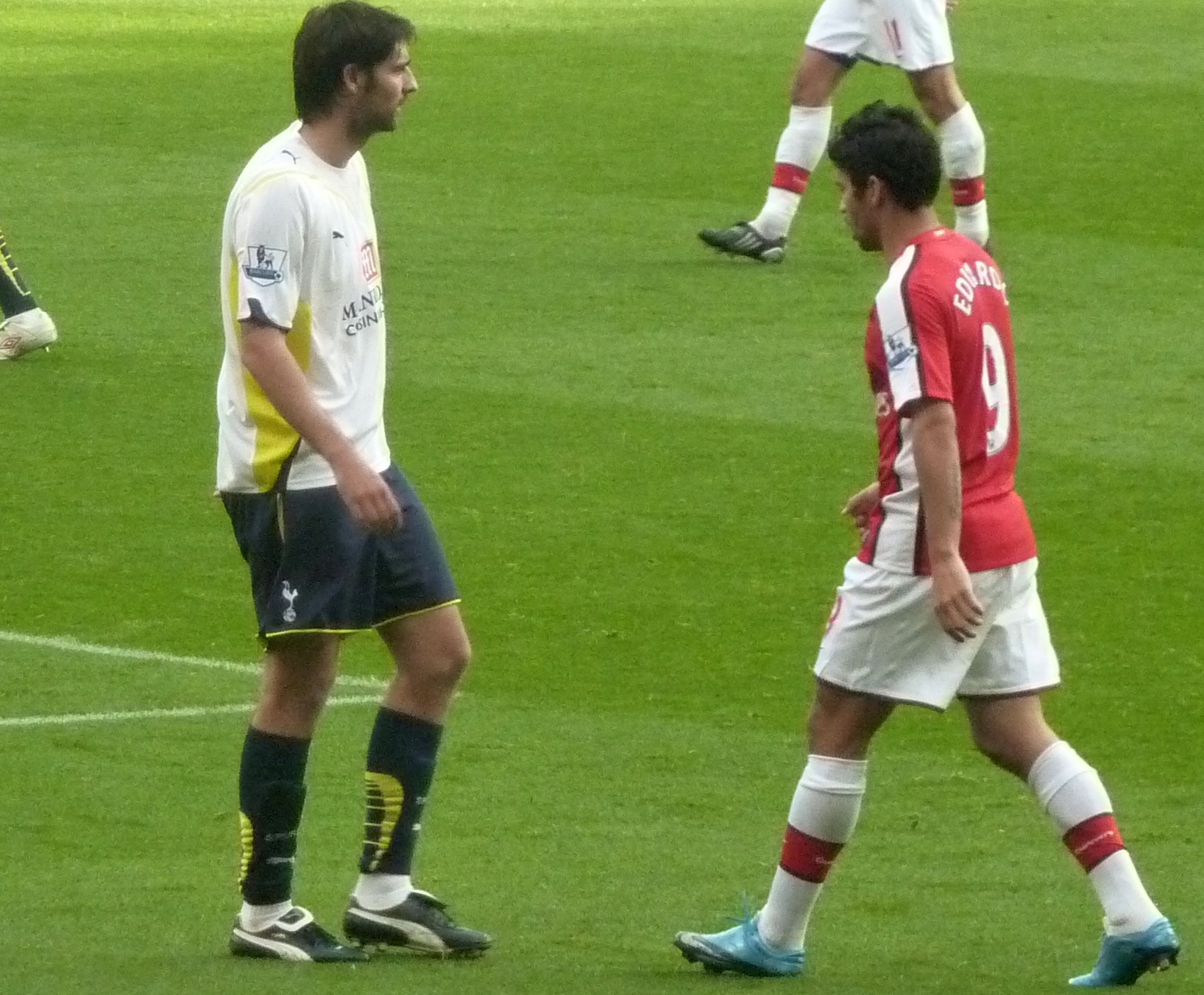
Eduardo with Arsenal against Tottenham Hotspur in 2009

==== Return to action ====
On 16 February 2009, Eduardo started against Cardiff City in the FA Cup, scoring in the 21st minute and converted a penalty in the second half. However, in that game, he suffered a hamstring injury. He returned against Burnley in the 5th round of the FA Cup, captaining the side and scoring Arsenal's second goal. He made his first appearance in the Premier League after the injury on the opening day of the 2009–10 season against Everton. He scored Arsenal's sixth goal in a 6–1 victory.

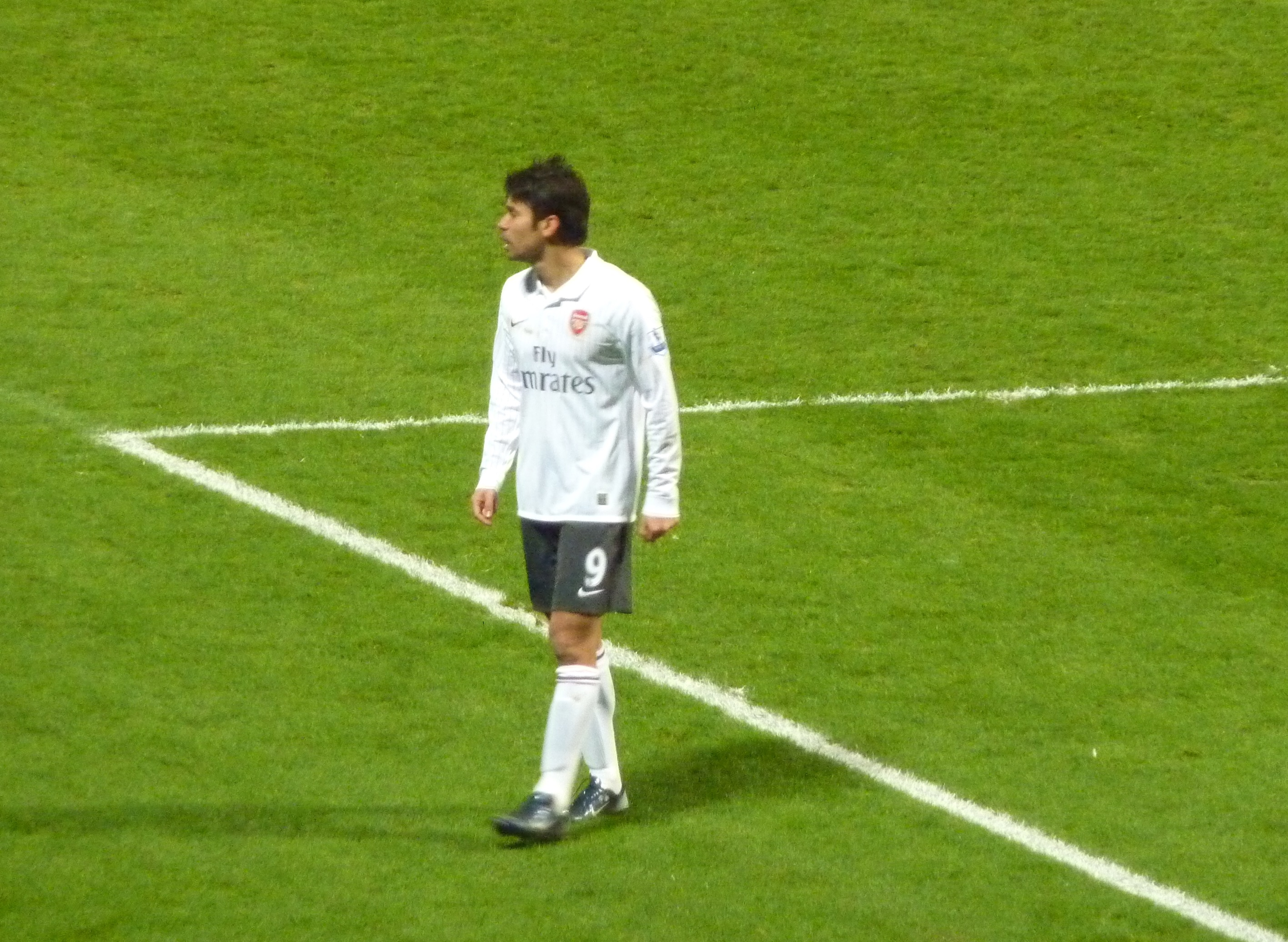
Eduardo playing for Arsenal vs West Ham United in 2010

A week later, Eduardo was accused of simulation by the Scottish FA chief executive Gordon Smith to win a penalty in the 3–1 Champions League win over Celtic; Smith also demanded a ban for the striker. On 28 August, Eduardo was charged by UEFA with "deceiving the referee" over the penalty incident and subsequently punished with a two-match European ban, However, the ruling was overturned on appeal with Arsenal producing video evidence showing the claim of simulation was inconclusive and testimony supporting the appeal also coming from Manuel Enrique Mejuto González, who had awarded the penalty. Eduardo later scored the winning goal in Arsenal's 3–2 win over Standard Liège on 16 September 2009. In November 2009, Eduardo signed a new long-term contract with Arsenal. He then scored his second Premier League goal of the season against Hull City on 19 December and scored again eleven days later in the 4–1 win over Portsmouth. Eduardo headed the winner in a 2–1 win over West Ham United to put Arsenal in the fourth round of the FA Cup on 3 January 2010. However, Arsenal were subsequently knocked out by Stoke City 3–1 at the Britannia Stadium.

=== Shakhtar Donetsk ===
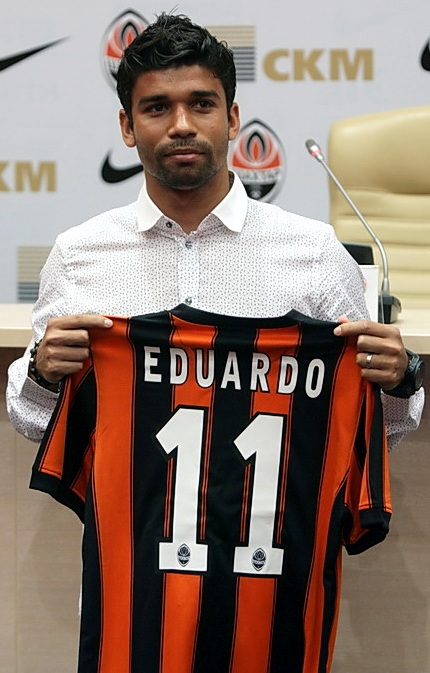
Eduardo signing for Shakhtar in 2010

On 21 July 2010, Eduardo signed for Shakhtar Donetsk on a four-year contract for an undisclosed fee, believed to be in the region of £6 million. He made his Ukrainian Premier League debut on 7 August 2010, playing the first half and netting the second goal in a 5–0 win against PFC Sevastopol. Shakhtar and Arsenal were both drawn into Group H in the Champions League, something Eduardo hoped would not happen prior to the draw.

Eduardo scored his second goal in an away game against Volyn Lutsk, coming on as a substitute, to give Shakhtar a 1–0 win. His third goal came in the Ukrainian Cup against Kryvbas Kryvyi Rih where, after coming on as a substitute, he scored the fifth goal in a 6–0 win. He then scored in the next match against Metalist Kharkiv, again coming on as a substitute, to level the game at 1–1, which Shakhtar went on to win 2–1 in a dramatic late fashion.

Returning to the Emirates Stadium on 19 October 2010 for Shakhtar's UEFA Champions League group match with Arsenal, Eduardo came on as a substitute with his new side 3–0 down and received a standing ovation from the Arsenal supporters. He scored a late consolation goal for Shakhtar in a game that Arsenal went on to win 5–1, at which point the Arsenal fans rose again and cheered their former hero. In the rematch, he scored the winning goal in a 2–1 victory and refused to celebrate, showing respect for his former club.

Eduardo scored a volley in 2–0 away win against Kryvbas on 6 November. In a game against FK Partizan in the Champions League, coming on as a substitute, he scored the third goal in a 3–0 Shakhtar win that put then on top of Group H. In the game against Partizan, he got a minor injury, but later came back onto the pitch.

On 5 April 2014, Eduardo scored two out of the three goals for Shakhtar Donetsk against Karpaty Lviv in a League game. The first goal came when teammate and compatriot, Darijo Srna, crossed the ball in from a corner, Eduardo headed the ball into the centre of the goal. The second goal came when Srna chipped the ball over a player to Luiz Adriano who chested the ball and fired the ball into the box for Eduardo to slot the ball into the goal once again. Shakhtar Donetsk were 2–0 up at half time and later finished the game 3–0 when Luiz Adriano outmuscled two players to slot the ball into the bottom left corner.

=== Flamengo ===
It was announced on 17 July 2014 that he had signed for Brazilian side Flamengo. The forward scored his first goal for the club on 10 August 2014, in a match against Sport.

=== Return to Shakhtar Donetsk ===
On 10 July 2015, Eduardo signed a one-and-a-half-year contract with his old club Shakhtar Donetsk.

=== Back to Brazil ===
In February 2017, Eduardo returned to Brazil to sign for Atlético Paranaense in Série A.

=== Legia Warsaw ===
In January 2018, Eduardo da Silva signed a one-year contract with Polish Ekstraklasa club Legia Warsaw. The player played for Legia with the number 9. In the 2017/18 season, he won the Polish Cup with Legia. After two games of the following season, he was removed from the list of players registered for the Ekstraklasa, in order to free a spot for newly signed André Martins. Eduardo struggled with injuries throughout his time at Legia. His contract was not renewed and he left the club at the end of 2018. Eduardo played a total of 14 games for Legia (11 in the Premier League, two in the Polish Cup and one in the Europa League qualifiers), without scoring a goal.

== International career ==
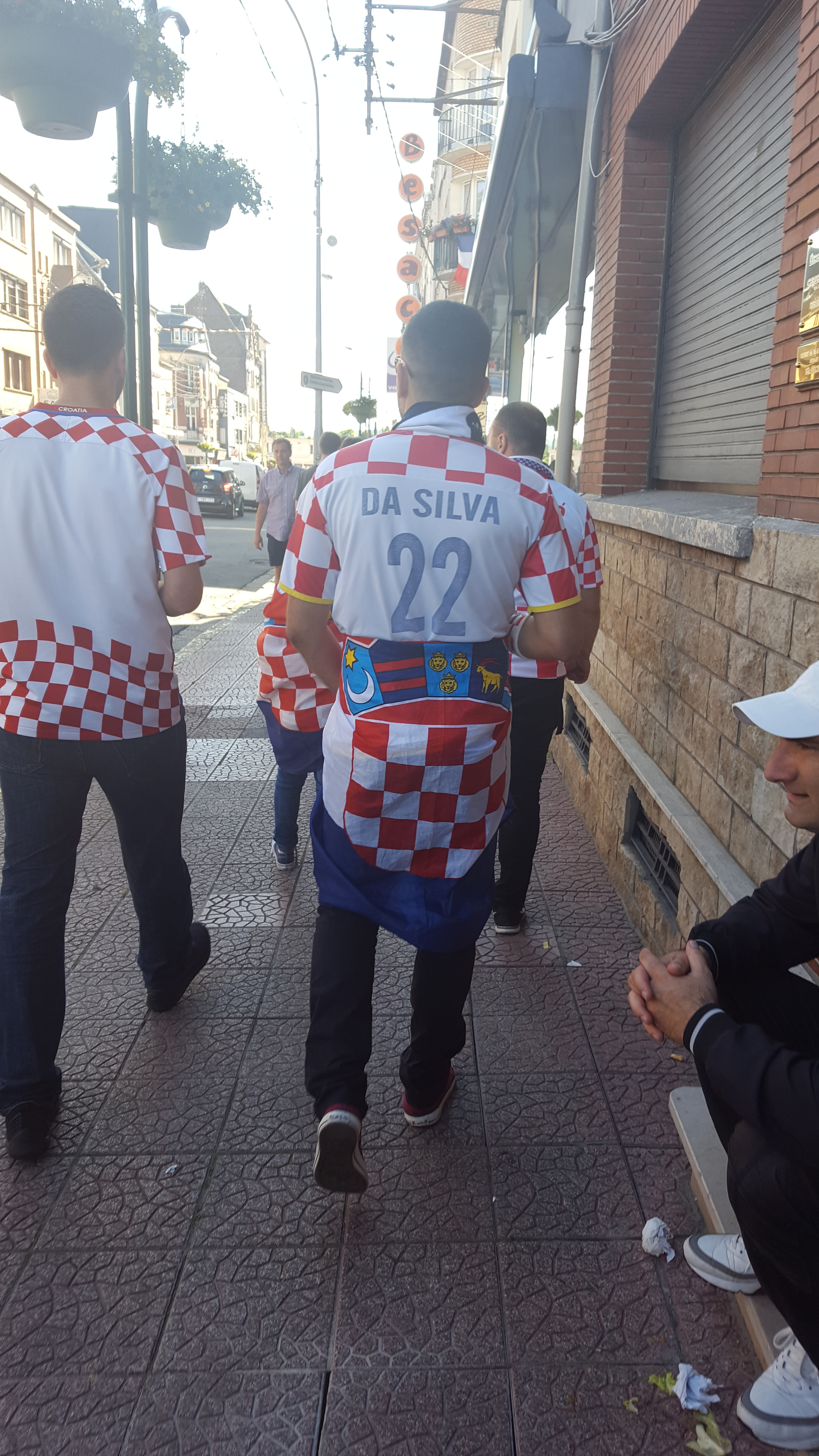
Croatian fans of Eduardo da Silva

=== Under-21 and early senior career ===
In 2002, Eduardo took Croatian citizenship and was first called up to play for the country's Under-21 team at the finals tournament of the 2004 European Under-21 Championship in Germany. He appeared in all three of Croatia's matches before they were eliminated from the tournament in the group stage. Eduardo also scored one goal in his international debut against Serbia and Montenegro national under-21 side. Eduardo was also called up to the Croatia team for the 2006 European Under-21 Championship qualifiers, in which he made a total of nine appearances and scored seven goals. However, Croatia failed to qualify for the final tournament after losing 5–2 on aggregate to Serbia and Montenegro in the play-offs, where Eduardo scored both of Croatia's goals. He won a total of twelve international caps and scored eight goals.

In the meantime, he was also called up a couple of times to play for the Croatia national football team. He made his international debut at senior level as a second-half substitute in the team's friendly match against the Republic of Ireland on 16 November 2004 at the age of 21. In 2005, he appeared in another two friendly matches for the Croatian team and also played in both of the team's two matches at the 2006 Carlsberg Cup in Hong Kong. He scored his first international goal for Croatia at the tournament, netting the third goal in the team's 4–0 victory over hosts Hong Kong in the third-place play-off on 1 February 2006. He was subsequently also a candidate for joining the national team at the 2006 World Cup finals in Germany, but in the end did not get called up by the team's then-coach, Zlatko Kranjčar, who commented that Eduardo "is a young player", that he "does not diminish his value" by not selecting him, and that he "most seriously counts on him in future matches".

=== Euro 2008 campaign ===
After the 2006 World Cup, Eduardo returned to the national team under new coach Slaven Bilić and started Croatia's friendly match against Italy on 16 August 2006, scoring the first goal in Croatia's 2–0 victory. He would later establish himself as one of the key players in Croatia's qualifying campaign for the Euro 2008. He made his competitive debut at senior international level in Croatia's goalless away draw against Russia on 6 September 2006 and went on to score his first competitive international goal for Croatia on 11 October 2006 in their 2–0 home win against England, when he opened the scoring by sending a looping header over the stranded Paul Robinson. In the following qualifier, away to Israel on 15 November 2006, Eduardo netted a hat-trick to help Croatia to drive home a narrow 4–3 victory over the strong Israeli side.

In Croatia's next qualifier, their first competitive game of the year 2007, at home against the sturdy Macedonian outfit on 24 March 2007, Eduardo scored the winner in the 88th minute to hand Croatia a 2–1 victory after trailing 1–0 at halftime. He went on to be Croatia's saviour in both of their qualifiers against Estonia, scoring all three goals in Croatia's 1–0 away and 2–0 home victories, as well as in their final home qualifier against Israel on 13 October 2007, where he netted the only goal in Croatia's 1–0 victory. He also set up Ivica Olić to score Croatia's 2nd goal in their famous 3–2 victory over England at Wembley—a win which saw England fail to qualify for Euro 2008. He finished the qualifying campaign with 10 goals in 12 matches and was the second-best goalscorer of the competition, after Northern Ireland's David Healy with 13 goals.

At Croatia's opening game of Euro 2008 against Austria, banners were shown in the crowd in support of Eduardo due to his injury. His national team manager Slaven Bilić also dedicated Croatia's performance to him.

=== Later career ===
After recovering from the leg injury, Eduardo made his first international appearance in just over a year, coming on as a substitute to replace Ivica Olić in the final 30 minutes of the friendly match against Romania on 11 February 2009, which saw Croatia recording a 2–1 away win. In the course of the same year, he made four appearances and scored three goals in Croatia's unsuccessful qualifying campaign for the 2010 FIFA World Cup.

Eduardo went on to make eleven appearances and score three goals as Croatia successfully qualified for the UEFA Euro 2012. At the finals, however, he only appeared as a late substitute in all of Croatia's three matches as they were eliminated in the group stage at the expense of eventual finalists Spain and Italy.

After making seven appearances and scoring two goals in the qualifying campaign, Eduardo was selected to be part of Croatia's squad for the 2014 FIFA World Cup finals in his native Brazil. He did not feature in the defeat to the hosts in the opening match of the tournament, but came on for the last 21 minutes of the 4–0 win over Cameroon in the second group game, in place of Ivica Olić, to make his only appearance at the tournament, which saw Croatia eliminated in the group stage once again. On 15 July 2014, following the World Cup, Eduardo announced his retirement from the national team.

== Personal life ==
On 10 December 2005, Eduardo married Andrea Šok in Zagreb. They have two children – daughter Lorena (b. 2006) and son Mateus (b. 2011), who plays for Flamengo's youth academy.

== Career statistics ==
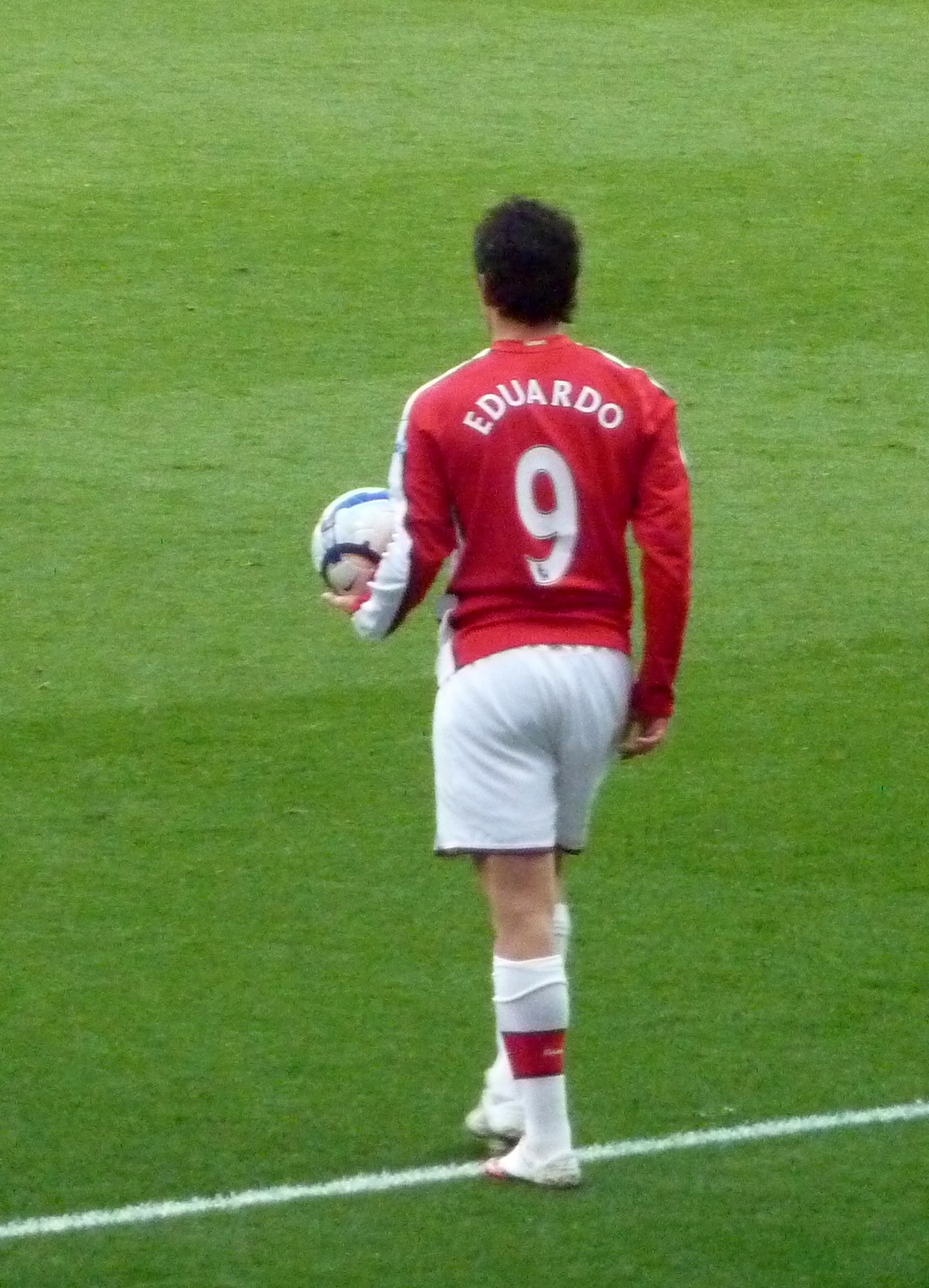
Eduardo with Arsenal in 2010

=== Club ===
Appearances and goals by club, season and competition
Club	Season	League			National cup (Note: Includes Croatian Cup, FA Cup, Ukrainian Cup, Copa do Brasil, Polish Cup)		League cup (Note: Includes Football League Cup)		Continental		Other		Total	
Club	Season	Division	Apps	Goals	Apps	Goals	Apps	Goals	Apps	Goals	Apps	Goals	Apps	Goals
Dinamo Zagreb	2001–02	Croatian First Football League	4	0	0	0	—		0	0	—		4	0
Dinamo Zagreb	2003–04	Croatian First Football League	24	9	7	3	—		6 (Note: Four appearances in UEFA Champions League, two appearances and one goal in UEFA Cup)	1	1 (Note: Appearance in Croatian Super Cup)	1	38	14
Dinamo Zagreb	2004–05	Croatian First Football League	21	10	2	0	—		7 (Note: Appearances in UEFA Cup)	1	1	0	31	11
Dinamo Zagreb	2005–06	Croatian First Football League	28	20	1	1	—		—		—		29	21
Dinamo Zagreb	2006–07	Croatian First Football League	32	34	8	6	—		6 (Note: Four appearances and three goals in UEFA Champions League, two appearances and two goals in UEFA Cup)	5	1	2	47	47
Dinamo Zagreb	Total		109	73	18	10	—		19	7	3	3	149	93
Inter Zaprešić (loan)	2002–03	Croatian Second Football League	15	10	0	0	—		—		—		15	10
Arsenal	2007–08	Premier League	17	4	3	1	5	4	6 (Note: Appearances in UEFA Champions League)	3	—		31	12
Arsenal	2008–09	Premier League	0	0	2	3	0	0	2	0	—		4	3
Arsenal	2009–10	Premier League	24	2	2	1	1	0	5	2	—		32	5
Arsenal	Total		41	6	7	5	6	4	13	5	—		67	20
Shakhtar Donetsk	2010–11	Ukrainian Premier League	22	6	3	2	—		8	4	0	0	33	12
Shakhtar Donetsk	2011–12	Ukrainian Premier League	16	5	1	2	—		5	0	0	0	22	7
Shakhtar Donetsk	2012–13	Ukrainian Premier League	20	4	4	0	—		3	0	1 (Note: Appearance in Ukrainian Super Cup)	0	28	4
Shakhtar Donetsk	2013–14	Ukrainian Premier League	23	9	5	4	—		2 (Note: One appearance in UEFA Champions League, one appearance in UEFA Europa League)	0	0	0	30	13
Shakhtar Donetsk	Total		81	24	13	8	—		18	4	1	0	113	36
Flamengo	2014	Série A	18	8	6	1	—		—		—		24	9
Flamengo	2015	Série A	9	2	3	1	—		—		10 (Note: Appearances in Campeonato Carioca)	1	22	4
Flamengo	Total		27	10	9	2	—		—		10	1	46	13
Shakhtar Donetsk	2015–16	Ukrainian Premier League	19	12	7	2	—		15 (Note: Seven appearances and one goal in UEFA Champions League, eight appearances and three goals in UEFA Europa League)	4	0	0	41	18
Shakhtar Donetsk	2016–17	Ukrainian Premier League	10	2	1	0	—		7 (Note: Two appearances in UEFA Champions League, five appearances and one goal in UEFA Europa League)	1	1	0	19	3
Shakhtar Donetsk	Total		29	14	8	2	—		22	5	1	0	60	21
Atlético Paranaense	2017	Série A	2	0	0	0	—		3 (Note: Appearances in Copa Libertadores)	0	0	0	5	0
Legia Warsaw	2017–18	Ekstraklasa	10	0	2	0	—		—		0	0	12	0
Legia Warsaw	2018–19	Ekstraklasa	1	0	0	0	—		1 (Note: Appearance in UEFA Europa League)	0	0	0	2	0
Legia Warsaw	Total		11	0	2	0	—		1	0	0	0	14	0
Career total			315	138	57	27	6	4	76	21	15	4	469	194

=== International ===
Appearances and goals by national team and year
National team	Year	Apps	Goals
Croatia	2004	1	0
Croatia	2005	2	0
Croatia	2006	7	6
Croatia	2007	11	7
Croatia	2008	1	0
Croatia	2009	6	5
Croatia	2010	7	0
Croatia	2011	9	4
Croatia	2012	9	4
Croatia	2013	7	3
Croatia	2014	4	0
Total		64	29

Scores and results list Croatia's goal tally first, score column indicates score after each Eduardo goal.

List of international goals scored by Eduardo da Silva
No.	Date	Venue	Cap	Opponent	Score	Result	Competition
1	1 February 2006	Hong Kong Stadium, Hong Kong, China	5	Hong Kong	3–0	4–0	2006 Carlsberg Cup
2	16 August 2006	Stadio Armando Picchi, Livorno, Italy	6	Italy	1–0	2–0	Friendly
3	11 October 2006	Stadion Maksimir, Zagreb, Croatia	9	England	1–0	2–0	UEFA Euro 2008 qualifying
4	15 November 2006	Ramat Gan Stadium, Ramat Gan, Israel	10	Israel	2–1	4–3	UEFA Euro 2008 qualifying
5	15 November 2006	Ramat Gan Stadium, Ramat Gan, Israel	10	Israel	3–1	4–3	UEFA Euro 2008 qualifying
6	15 November 2006	Ramat Gan Stadium, Ramat Gan, Israel	10	Israel	4–2	4–3	UEFA Euro 2008 qualifying
7	24 March 2007	Stadion Maksimir, Zagreb, Croatia	12	Macedonia	2–1	2–1	UEFA Euro 2008 qualifying
8	2 June 2007	A. Le Coq Arena, Tallinn, Estonia	13	Estonia	1–0	1–0	UEFA Euro 2008 qualifying
9	22 August 2007	Koševo City Stadium, Sarajevo, Bosnia and Herzegovina	15	Bosnia and Herzegovina	1–0	5–3	Friendly
10	8 September 2007	Stadion Maksimir, Zagreb, Croatia	16	Estonia	1–0	2–0	UEFA Euro 2008 qualifying
11	8 September 2007	Stadion Maksimir, Zagreb, Croatia	16	Estonia	2–0	2–0	UEFA Euro 2008 qualifying
12	12 September 2007	Estadi Comunal, Andorra la Vella, Andorra	17	Andorra	5–0	6–0	UEFA Euro 2008 qualifying
13	13 October 2007	Stadion Maksimir, Zagreb, Croatia	18	Israel	1–0	1–0	UEFA Euro 2008 qualifying
14	1 April 2009	Estadi Comunal, Andorra la Vella, Andorra	24	Andorra	2–0	2–0	2010 FIFA World Cup qualification
15	12 August 2009	Dinamo Stadium, Minsk, Belarus	25	Belarus	2–0	3–1	2010 FIFA World Cup qualification
16	9 September 2009	Wembley Stadium, London, England	27	England	1–4	1–5	2010 FIFA World Cup qualification
17	14 November 2009	Stadion HNK Cibalia, Vinkovci, Croatia	28	Liechtenstein	3–0	5–0	Friendly
18	14 November 2009	Stadion HNK Cibalia, Vinkovci, Croatia	28	Liechtenstein	4–0	5–0	Friendly
19	9 February 2011	Stadion Aldo Drosina, Pula, Croatia	36	Czech Republic	1–0	4–2	Friendly
20	6 September 2011	Stadion Maksimir, Zagreb, Croatia	40	Israel	2–1	3–1	UEFA Euro 2012 qualifying
21	6 September 2011	Stadion Maksimir, Zagreb, Croatia	40	Israel	3–1	3–1	UEFA Euro 2012 qualifying
22	11 October 2011	Stadion Kantrida, Rijeka, Croatia	42	Latvia	1–0	2–0	UEFA Euro 2012 qualifying
23	2 June 2012	Ullevaal, Oslo, Norway	47	Norway	1–0	1–1	Friendly
24	15 August 2012	Stadion Poljud, Split, Croatia	51	Switzerland	1–1	2–4	Friendly
25	15 August 2012	Stadion Poljud, Split, Croatia	51	Switzerland	2–3	2–4	Friendly
26	16 October 2012	Stadion Gradski vrt, Osijek, Croatia	53	Wales	2–0	2–0	2014 FIFA World Cup qualification
27	26 March 2013	Liberty Stadium, Swansea, Wales	54	Wales	2–1	2–1	2014 FIFA World Cup qualification
28	14 August 2013	Rheinpark Stadion, Vaduz, Lichtenstein	56	Liechtenstein	1–0	3–2	Friendly
29	14 August 2013	Rheinpark Stadion, Vaduz, Lichtenstein	56	Liechtenstein	3–2	3–2	Friendly

== Honours ==
Dinamo Zagreb

- Prva HNL: 2005–06, 2006–07
- Croatian Cup: 2001–02, 2003–04, 2006–07
- Croatian Super Cup: 2003, 2006

Shakhtar Donetsk

- Ukrainian Premier League: 2010–11, 2011–12, 2012–13, 2013–14
- Ukrainian Cup: 2010–11, 2011–12, 2012–13, 2015–16
- Ukrainian Super Cup: 2012, 2013, 2015

Legia Warsaw

- Ekstraklasa: 2017–18
- Polish Cup: 2017–18

Individual

- SN Yellow Shirt Award: 2006, 2007
- HNL's Footballer of the Year: 2005–06, 2006–07
- Croatian Footballer of the Year: 2006
- Croatian First League top scorer: 2006–07
- Football League Cup top scorer: 2007–08
