= Ismaily (footballer) =

Brazilian footballer (born 1990)

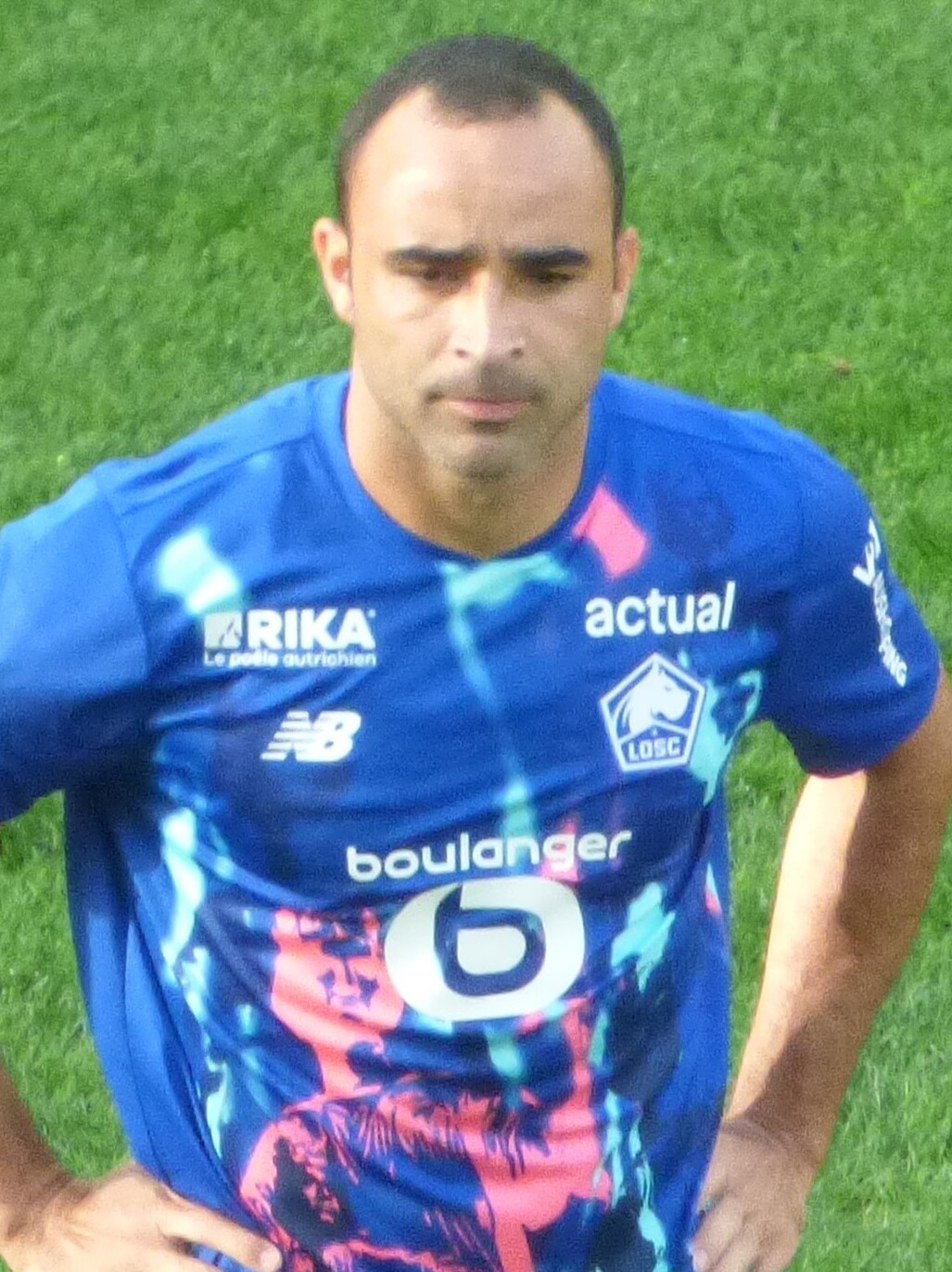
- Ismaily with Lille in 2023

Personal information
- Full name: Ismaily Gonçalves dos Santos
- Date of birth: 11 January 1990 (age 36)
- Place of birth: Angélica, Brazil
- Height: 1.77 m (5 ft 10 in)
- Position: Left-back

Youth career
- 2006–2007: Ivinhema
- 2009: Desportivo Brasil

Senior career*
Years	Team	Apps	(Gls)
2007–2008	Ivinhema	?	(11)
2008–2009	Desportivo Brasil	8	(0)
2008	→ São Bento (loan)	0	(0)
2009–2010	Estoril	29	(1)
2010–2012	Olhanense	42	(2)
2012–2013	Braga	12	(1)
2013–2022	Shakhtar Donetsk	149	(13)
2022–2025	Lille	69	(3)
- * Club domestic league appearances and goals as of 13:41, 13 May 2025 (UTC)

Ismaily Gonçalves dos Santos (born 11 January 1990), known simply as Ismaily, is a Brazilian professional footballer who plays as a left-back.

After starting out at Ivinhema, and three and a half seasons in Portugal with three clubs, he went on to spend most of his career with Shakhtar Donetsk in the Ukrainian Premier League, winning several titles.

== Club career ==
=== Brazil ===
Born in Angélica, Mato Grosso do Sul, Ismaily started his career with Ivinhema Futebol Clube in 2007. A forward, he scored 11 goals to be his team's top scorer in the 2008 Campeonato Sul-Mato-Grossense.

Ismaily subsequently moved to Desportivo Brasil, being immediately loaned to Esporte Clube São Bento until the end of the Copa Paulista. However, he failed to make an appearance for the club.

Back at Desportivo Brasil, Ismaily played for the under-20s in the 2009 Copa São Paulo de Futebol Júnior and was converted to a left-back, before being promoted to the first team. He made his competitive debut on 10 May of that year, coming on as a first-half substitute in a 1–2 Campeonato Paulista Segunda Divisão home loss against Red Bull Brasil, and appeared in only eight first-team matches before departing.

=== Portugal ===
In the 2009–10 season, 19-year-old Ismaily moved to Portugal, signing for G.D. Estoril-Praia in the Segunda Liga and playing all the games but one (always as a starter) to help to an 11th-place finish. His first goal for his new club occurred on 8 November 2009, in a 2–0 home win over Gil Vicente FC.

Ismaily stayed in the country in summer 2010, joining Primeira Liga side S.C. Olhanense. He appeared in 25 matches in his second year, scoring in a 3–2 away defeat of Vitória F.C. to help complete a comeback from 2–0.

On 16 June 2012, after an aborted transfer to C.D. Nacional, Ismaily agreed to a four-year contract with S.C. Braga. He made his competitive debut at S.L. Benfica in the league opener, providing two assists in an eventual 2–2 draw.

On 22 August 2012, in the first leg of the last qualifying round of the UEFA Champions League, Ismaily equalised for Braga with a 30-meter effort for the final 1–1 home draw against Udinese Calcio.

=== Shakhtar Donetsk ===
In February 2013, Ismaily signed a five-year deal with FC Shakhtar Donetsk, joining a host of compatriots at the Ukrainian Premier League side. In October 2018 he was voted the competition's Player of the Month, becoming the second Brazilian player to receive that award.

=== Lille ===
On 5 August 2022, Ismaily joined Lille OSC on a free transfer, on a one-year contract with an optional year. He made his Ligue 1 debut one week later, closing the 1–1 draw at FC Nantes after an assist from Jonathan David and scoring the club's 5,000th goal in all competitions in the process.

== International career ==
In May 2017, Ismaily expressed interest in playing for the Ukraine national team. On 20 March 2018, however, after the injuries of Filipe Luís and Alex Sandro, he was called by Brazil coach Tite for friendlies against Russia and Germany.

== Personal life ==
Ismaily was named after the motion picture Smiley, from 1956.

== Career statistics ==
As of match played 10 May 2025

Appearances and goals by club, season and competition
Club	Season	League			National Cup		League Cup		Continental		Other		Total	
Club	Season	Division	Apps	Goals	Apps	Goals	Apps	Goals	Apps	Goals	Apps	Goals	Apps	Goals
Olhanense	2010–11	Primeira Liga	17	1	2	0	5	1	—		—		24	2
Olhanense	2011–12	Primeira Liga	25	1	0	0	1	0	—		—		26	0
Olhanense	Total		42	2	2	0	6	1	—		—		50	2
Braga	2012–13	Primeira Liga	12	1	3	0	3	0	6 (Note: Appearances in UEFA Champions League)	0	—		24	1
Shakhtar Donetsk	2012–13	Ukrainian Premier League	1	1	0	0	—		0	0	0	0	1	1
Shakhtar Donetsk	2013–14	Ukrainian Premier League	11	2	2	0	—		1 (Note: Appearances in UEFA Europa League)	0	0	0	14	2
Shakhtar Donetsk	2014–15	Ukrainian Premier League	8	0	2	0	—		0	0	0	0	10	0
Shakhtar Donetsk	2015–16	Ukrainian Premier League	10	3	6	0	—		10 (Note: Appearances in UEFA Champions League and UEFA Europa League)	0	1	0	27	3
Shakhtar Donetsk	2016–17	Ukrainian Premier League	28	2	1	0	—		10	0	1	0	40	2
Shakhtar Donetsk	2017–18	Ukrainian Premier League	29	3	3	0	—		8	1	1	0	41	4
Shakhtar Donetsk	2018–19	Ukrainian Premier League	27	0	3	0	—		8	2	1	0	39	2
Shakhtar Donetsk	2019–20	Ukrainian Premier League	21	2	1	0	—		9	0	1	0	32	2
Shakhtar Donetsk	2020–21	Ukrainian Premier League	2	0	0	0	—		1	0	0	0	3	0
Shakhtar Donetsk	2021–22	Ukrainian Premier League	12	0	1	0	—		7	0	1	0	21	0
Shakhtar Donetsk	Total		149	13	19	0	—		54	3	6	0	228	16
Lille	2022–23	Ligue 1	23	2	2	0	—		—		—		25	2
Lille	2023–24	Ligue 1	30	1	3	0	—		5 (Note: Appearances in UEFA Europa Conference League)	0	—		38	1
Lille	2024–25	Ligue 1	16	0	2	1	—		6	0	—		24	1
Lille	Total		69	3	7	1	—		11	0	—		87	4
Career total			272	15	31	1	9	1	71	3	6	0	389	23

== Honours ==
Ivinhema

- Campeonato Sul-Matogrossense: 2008

Braga

- Taça da Liga: 2012–13

Shakhtar Donetsk

- Ukrainian Premier League: 2012–13, 2013–14, 2016–17, 2017–18, 2018–19, 2019–20
- Ukrainian Cup: 2012–13, 2015–16, 2016–17, 2017–18, 2018–19
- Ukrainian Super Cup: 2013, 2014, 2015, 2017, 2021

Individual

- Ukrainian Premier League Player of the Month: October 2018
