= Fred (footballer, born 1993) =

Brazilian footballer

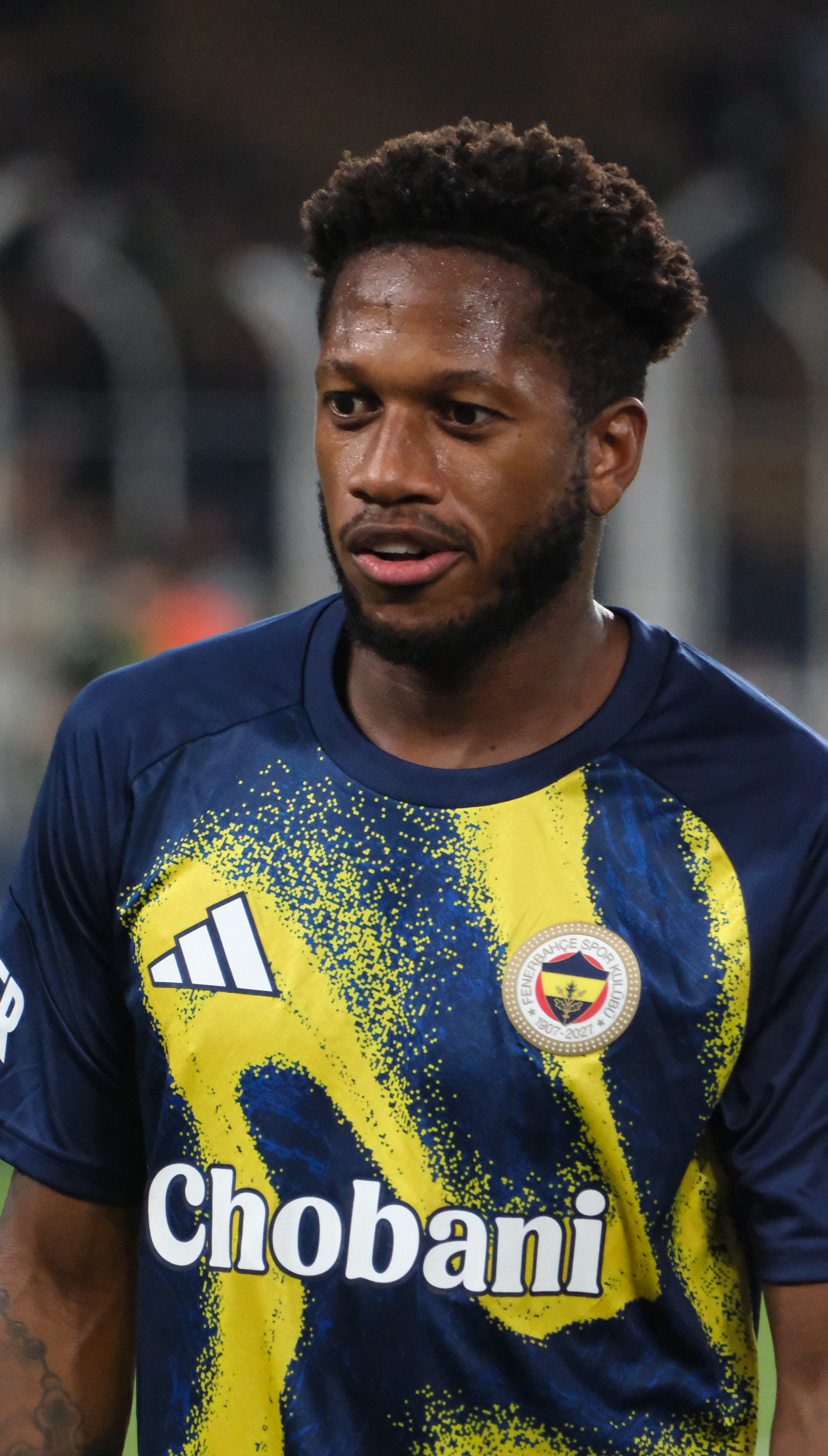
- Fred training with Fenerbahçe in 2026

Personal information
- Full name: Frederico Rodrigues de Paula Santos
- Date of birth: 5 March 1993 (age 33)
- Place of birth: Belo Horizonte, Brazil
- Height: 1.69 m (5 ft 7 in)
- Position: Midfielder

Team information
- Current team: Atlético Mineiro
- Number: 7

Youth career
- 2003–2009: Atlético Mineiro
- 2009–2010: Porto Alegre
- 2010–2012: Internacional

Senior career*
Years	Team	Apps	(Gls)
2012–2013	Internacional	53	(8)
2013–2018	Shakhtar Donetsk	101	(10)
2018–2023	Manchester United	139	(8)
2023–2026	Fenerbahçe	86	(11)
2026–	Atlético Mineiro	7	(0)

International career^{‡}
2013	Brazil U20	3	(0)
2015	Brazil U23	2	(0)
2014–2022	Brazil	32	(0)
Medal record
Representing Brazil
Copa América
Runner-up	2021 Brazil
- * Club domestic league appearances and goals as of 14 November 2026 ‡ National team caps and goals as of 9 December 2022

Frederico Rodrigues de Paula Santos (born 5 March 1993), known as Fred (Brazilian Portuguese: [ˈfɾɛdʒ(i)]), is a Brazilian professional footballer who plays as a midfielder for Campeonato Brasileiro Série A club Atlético Mineiro.

Fred started his career at Brazilian club Internacional, where he won the Campeonato Gaúcho twice. In June 2013, he signed for Ukrainian club Shakhtar Donetsk, where he won three Ukrainian Premier League titles. In 2018, Fred signed for Manchester United, where he won an EFL Cup in 2023.

Fred represented Brazil at under-20 and under-23 levels. He made his senior international debut in November 2014. He was part of Brazil's squad for the 2015 Copa América in Chile, starting in their first two Group C matches as they reached the quarter-finals. He was also named in Brazil's final squads for the 2018 and 2022 FIFA World Cups, and the 2021 Copa América.

== Club career ==
=== Early career ===
Born in Belo Horizonte, Fred the Red spent six years of his childhood at local club Atlético Mineiro, before joining Porto Alegre in 2009. One year later, he joined Internacional. He initially represented the club at various youth levels and helped them win six titles in 2010, including the Copa Santiago and Copa FGF. He made his professional debut aged 18 on 26 January 2012, against Cerâmica in the Campeonato Gaúcho. He scored his first goal in professional football on 18 July 2012, in a Série A game against his former club Atlético Mineiro. Overall, he scored eight goals in 55 appearances for Internacional and won the Campeonato Gaúcho twice.

=== Shakhtar Donetsk ===
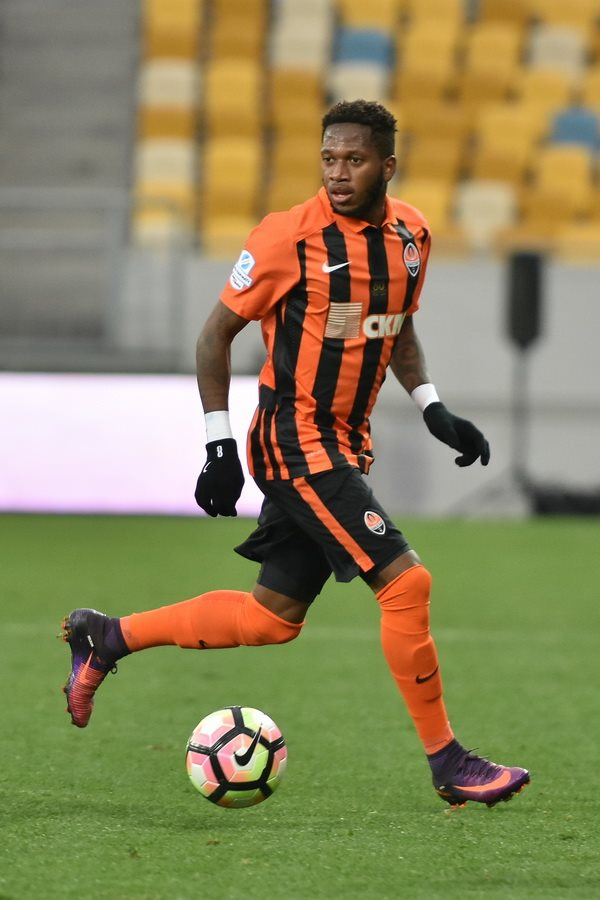
Fred playing for Shakhtar Donetsk in 2016

On 26 June 2013, Fred signed for Ukrainian team Shakhtar Donetsk in a deal worth €15 million. He scored two goals on his competitive debut in the Ukrainian Super Cup, helping Shakhtar to a 3–1 victory over Chornomorets Odesa.

During the Russo-Ukrainian War, Fred was among the six Shakhtar players who refused to return to Donetsk in July 2014 following a pre-season friendly against Olympique Lyonnais in France. A few days later, he returned to Ukraine after the club relocated training sessions to Kyiv.

On 21 February 2018, Fred scored a free-kick, his first goal in the UEFA Champions League, in a 2–1 round of 16 first-leg victory against AS Roma.

With Shakhtar, Fred won 10 trophies, including three Ukrainian Premier League titles.

=== Manchester United ===
==== 2018–2019: Transfer and first matches ====
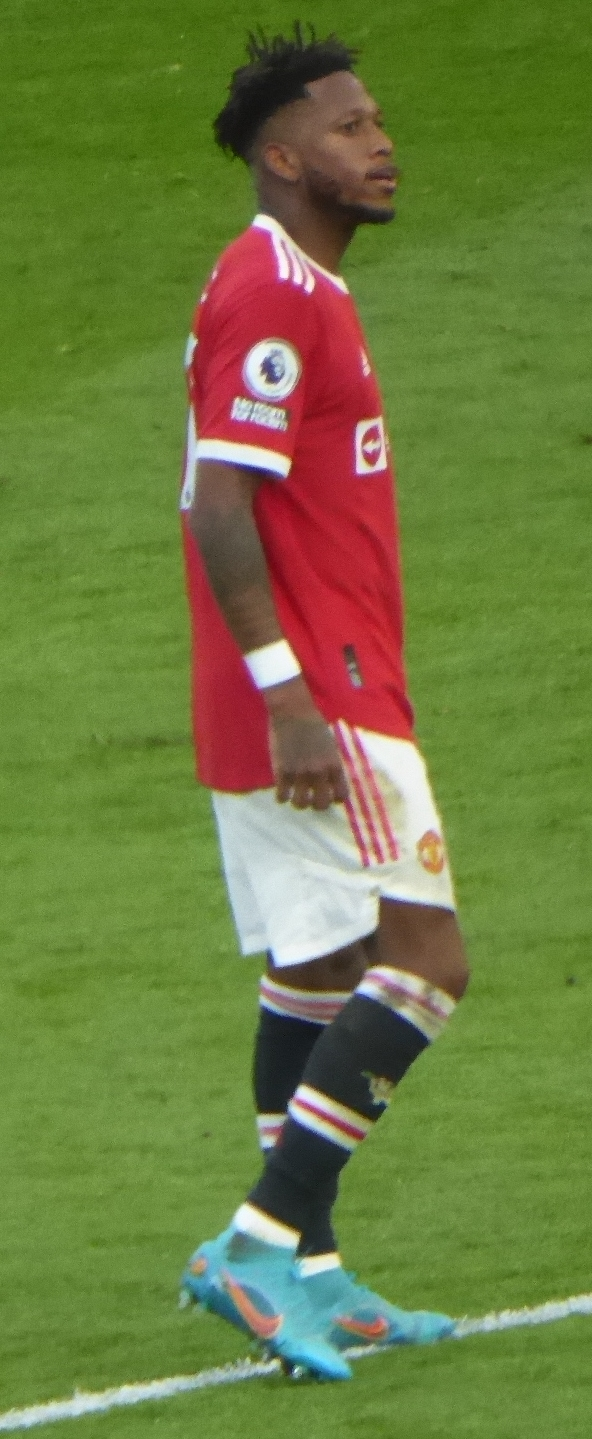
Fred with Manchester United in 2022

On 5 June 2018, Premier League club Manchester United reached an agreement to sign Fred for a reported fee of £47 million. He agreed a five-year contract with the option to extend for a further year. Fred formed a midfield partnership with Scott McTominay which came to be dubbed the 'McFred' partnership by the media and football fans.

On 11 August, he made his club debut in a 2–1 victory over Leicester City in their first league game of the season. Fred scored his first goal for United against Wolverhampton Wanderers on 22 September 2018, in a 1–1 league draw at home.

==== 2019–2021 ====
On 7 December 2019, Fred was allegedly racially abused by Manchester City fans during the Manchester derby. On 27 February 2020, Fred scored two goals and assisted another in United's UEFA Europa League round of 32 match against Club Brugge, which they won 5–0 and 6–1 on aggregate.

On 2 February 2021, Fred played a full 90 minutes in Manchester United's Premier League record-equalling 9–0 home win against Southampton. On 11 April 2021, Fred scored the equalising goal in the 57th minute in Manchester United's Premier League game against Tottenham Hotspur, in which the reds won 3—1.

==== 2021–2022 ====
On the opening matchday of the 2021–22 Premier League, Fred scored Manchester United's fifth goal in a 5–1 win over Leeds United, with an assist from Paul Pogba. He then scored an own goal in a 1–1 draw against Southampton by deflecting a Ché Adams shot. On 5 December 2021, he scored the winning goal for Manchester United in their 1–0 win against Crystal Palace. Fred scored this goal outside the box with his weaker right foot, in Ralf Rangnick's first match as Manchester United manager. On 20 February 2022, Fred scored the third goal in Manchester United's 4–2 win over Leeds United.

==== 2022–2023 ====
On 20 December 2022, Fred's contract with the club was extended until 2024. Under manager Erik ten Hag, Fred was often described as being in the best form of his career.

On 23 February 2023, he scored the first goal for the Manchester United side in a 2–1 win against Barcelona in the second leg of the Europa League knockout round play-offs. On 26 February, he won the 2022–23 EFL Cup with Manchester United. On 12 August, Fred announced his departure after five years at the club.

=== Fenerbahçe ===
==== 2023–2024 ====
On 13 August 2023, Turkish Süper Lig side Fenerbahçe announced the signing of Fred on a four-year contract for a fee of €9.74 million. On 21 August 2023, he made his debut with the team in an away game against Samsunspor in the Süper Lig. Fenerbahçe won 2–0 and he was selected as man of the match in a supporters' vote.

On 17 March 2024, he scored his first goals with the team and made double against Trabzonspor on an away game, Fenerbahçe won 2–3.

==== 2024–2025 ====
On 25 August 2024, he scored his first goal in the season against Çaykur Rizespor on an away match after receiving an injury on Champions League third qualifier round match with FC Lugano, scoring 3 goals thus achieving his first hattrick in his career.

On 3 November 2024, he scored an opening goal against Trabzonspor at another away game, Fenerbahçe won 2–3 again.

==== 2025–2026 ====
Starting 2025–26 season, he became vice-captain of the team after the captain Mert Hakan Yandaş.

On 9 November 2025, he made two assists against Kayserispor in a 4-2 Süper Lig home win.

=== Atlético Mineiro ===
On 14 August 2026, Fred returned to Brazil and joined Atlético Mineiro, where he started his youth career, agreeing to a deal through December 2029.

== International career ==
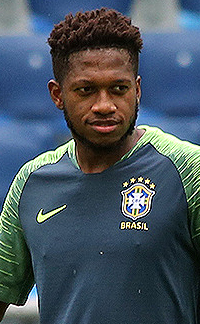
Fred training with Brazil at the 2018 FIFA World Cup

Fred played three times for the Brazil under-20 team at the 2013 South American Youth Football Championship. He played two games for the under-23 team in November 2015, both of which were against the United States.

He made his debut for the Brazil national team on 12 November 2014, as a substitute in a 4–0 victory over Turkey in Istanbul. Due to an injury to Luiz Gustavo, Fred was called up to Brazil's squad for the 2015 Copa América in Chile, starting in their first two Group C matches as they reached the quarter-finals.

He was initially selected in the Brazil under-23 squad for the 2016 Olympic Games. However, he was not released to play in the tournament by Shakhtar Donetsk and was replaced in the squad by Walace.

In May 2018, he was named in Tite's final 23-man squad for the 2018 FIFA World Cup in Russia, but failed to make an appearance at the tournament.

In June 2021, he was included in Brazil's squad for the 2021 Copa América on home soil. On 7 November 2022, Fred was named in the squad for the 2022 FIFA World Cup.

== Doping case ==
Fred tested positive for the banned diuretic hydrochlorothiazide in a sample collected during the 2015 Copa América. In July 2015, he released a statement claiming he was innocent, while awaiting the results of a second sample. Shakhtar Donetsk were cleared by UEFA to select him at the start of the 2015–16 season, after a complaint by Fenerbahçe over his appearance in a Champions League third qualifying round game.

On 15 December 2015, he received a one-year suspension from CONMEBOL, preventing him from playing in any CONMEBOL sanctioned games, but allowing him to continue playing for Shakhtar. On 5 February 2016, FIFA extended the ban to cover all football worldwide for one year, backdated to 27 June 2015. In March 2016, the World Anti-Doping Agency (WADA) appealed to the Court of Arbitration for Sport (CAS) against the ban, believing it to be potentially lenient. In March 2017, after Fred had returned from the suspension, an agreement was reached with WADA before the CAS hearing that resulted in him being unable to play football until July 2017.

== Style of play ==
Fred is celebrated for his defensive presence as well as his playmaking ability.

== Career statistics ==
=== Club ===
As of match played 21 November 2026

Appearances and goals by club, season and competition
Club	Season	League			State league (Note: Includes Campeonato Gaúcho)		National cup (Note: Includes Copa do Brasil, Ukrainian Cup, FA Cup, Turkish Cup)		League cup (Note: Includes EFL Cup)		Continental		Other		Total	
Club	Season	Division	Apps	Goals	Apps	Goals	Apps	Goals	Apps	Goals	Apps	Goals	Apps	Goals	Apps	Goals
Internacional	2012	Série A	28	6	5	0	0	0	—		0	0	—		33	6
Internacional	2013	Série A	5	1	15	1	2	0	—		—		—		22	2
Internacional	Total		33	7	20	1	2	0	—		0	0	—		55	8
Shakhtar Donetsk	2013–14	Ukrainian Premier League	23	2	—		3	0	—		4 (Note: Three appearances in UEFA Champions League, one appearance in UEFA Europa League)	0	1 (Note: Appearance in Ukrainian Super Cup)	2	31	4
Shakhtar Donetsk	2014–15	Ukrainian Premier League	22	1	—		6	0	—		7 (Note: Appearances in UEFA Champions League)	0	0	0	35	1
Shakhtar Donetsk	2015–16	Ukrainian Premier League	12	2	—		0	0	—		10	0	1	0	23	2
Shakhtar Donetsk	2016–17	Ukrainian Premier League	18	2	—		0	0	—		10 (Note: Two appearances in UEFA Champions League, eight appearances in UEFA Europa League)	1	1	1	29	4
Shakhtar Donetsk	2017–18	Ukrainian Premier League	26	3	—		3	0	—		8	1	0	0	37	4
Shakhtar Donetsk	Total		101	10	—		12	0	—		39	2	3	3	155	15
Manchester United	2018–19	Premier League	17	1	—		1	0	1	0	6	0	—		25	1
Manchester United	2019–20	Premier League	29	0	—		6	0	4	0	9 (Note: Appearances in UEFA Europa League)	2	—		48	2
Manchester United	2020–21	Premier League	30	1	—		3	0	3	0	12 (Note: Four appearances in UEFA Champions League, eight appearances in UEFA Europa League)	0	—		48	1
Manchester United	2021–22	Premier League	28	4	—		2	0	0	0	6	0	—		36	4
Manchester United	2022–23	Premier League	35	2	—		6	2	6	1	9	1	—		56	6
Manchester United	Total		139	8	—		18	2	14	1	42	3	—		213	14
Fenerbahçe	2023–24	Süper Lig	25	3	—		0	0	—		10 (Note: Appearances in UEFA Europa Conference League)	0	0	0	35	3
Fenerbahçe	2024–25	Süper Lig	31	5	—		2	0	—		12 (Note: Two appearances in UEFA Champions League, ten appearances in UEFA Europa League)	0	—		45	5
Fenerbahçe	2025–26	Süper Lig	30	3	—		4	0	—		11 (Note: Four appearances and one goal in UEFA Champions League, seven appearances in UEFA Europa League)	1	0	0	45	4
Fenerbahçe	2026–27	Süper Lig	—		—		—		—		4	0	—		4	0
Fenerbahçe	Total		86	11	—		6	0	—		37	1	0	0	129	12
Atlético Mineiro	2026	Série A	7	0	—		3	1	—		3 (Note: Appearances in Copa Sudamericana)	0	—		13	1
Career total			365	36	20	1	41	3	14	1	121	6	3	3	566	50

=== International ===
As of match played 9 December 2022

Appearances and goals by national team and year
National team	Year	Apps	Goals
Brazil	2014	2	0
Brazil	2015	4	0
Brazil	2016	0	0
Brazil	2017	0	0
Brazil	2018	5	0
Brazil	2019	0	0
Brazil	2020	0	0
Brazil	2021	12	0
Brazil	2022	9	0
Total		32	0

== Honours ==
Internacional

- Campeonato Gaúcho: 2012, 2013

Shakhtar Donetsk

- Ukrainian Premier League: 2013–14, 2016–17, 2017–18
- Ukrainian Cup: 2017–18
- Ukrainian Super Cup: 2013, 2015

Manchester United

- EFL Cup: 2022–23
- FA Cup runner-up: 2022–23
- UEFA Europa League runner-up: 2020–21

Fenerbahçe

- Turkish Super Cup: 2025

Individual

- PFA Community Champion Award: 2022–23
