= Kurylo =

Kurylo (Ukrainian: Курило) is a surname. It may refer to:

- Vitalii Kurylo (born 1957), Ukrainian politician
- Darryl Kurylo (born 1965), American voice actor
- Ihor Kurylo (born 1993), Ukrainian football player
- Michael Kurylo (born 1996), better known as Bunny FuFuu, American esports player
