= Maksym Malyshev =

Ukrainian footballer

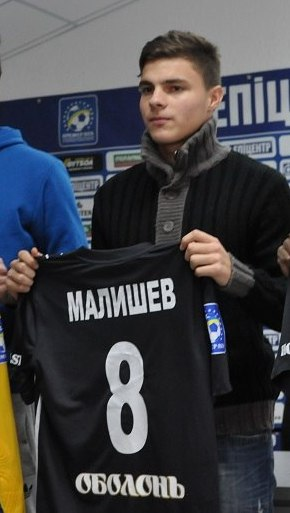

Personal information
- Full name: Maksym Vasylyovych Malyshev
- Date of birth: 24 December 1992 (age 33)
- Place of birth: Donetsk, Ukraine
- Height: 1.81 m (5 ft 11 1/2 in)
- Position: Midfielder

Youth career
- 2005–2009: Shakhtar Donetsk

Senior career*
Years	Team	Apps	(Gls)
2009–2021	Shakhtar Donetsk	43	(3)
2009–2013	→ Shakhtar-3 Donetsk	49	(12)
2013–2015	→ Zorya Luhansk (loan)	26	(3)

International career^{‡}
2013–2014	Ukraine U21	8	(0)
2016–2017	Ukraine	3	(0)
- * Club domestic league appearances and goals as of 24 December 2021 ‡ National team caps and goals as of 24 December 2021

Maksym Malyshev (Ukrainian: Максим Васильович Малишев; born 24 December 1992) is a Ukrainian football midfielder.

== Career ==
After playing for the Shakhtar Donetsk reserves and FC Shakhtar-3 Donetsk, in February 2013 he joined FC Zorya Luhansk on loan and made his debut in the Ukrainian Premier League. The following year, 2014–15, Malyshev continued to play on loan at Zorya and gained a lot more top flight experience in the process. He started most of their league games (playing over 1400 minutes) and scored three goals.

He made his Shakhtar debut on 19 July 2015 by playing the whole game in the Miners' 2015–16 season opener against Oleksandriya.

8 May 2016 for the first time brought the Donetsk "Shakhtar" with the captain's armband for the match against the 25th round of UPL " Karpaty" . Rated Donetsk team captain Darijo Srna missed the match due to injury. Malyshev only in the current season debuted in the first team, held at that time as part of Shakhtar 31 matches, scoring four goals and made four assists.

== International career ==
In June 2015, he took part in the national team of Ukraine in the World Youth Championship in New Zealand.

== Honours ==
=== Club ===
Shakhtar

- Ukrainian Premier League: 2016–17, 2017–18, 2018–19
- Ukrainian Cup: 2015–16, 2016–17, 2017–18, 2018–19
- Ukrainian Super Cup: 2015, 2017

== Career statistics ==
=== Club ===
As of 26 June 2020

Club	Season	League			Ukrainian Cup		Champions League		Europa League		Ukrainian Super Cup		Total	
Club	Season	Division	Apps	Goals	Apps	Goals	Apps	Goals	Apps	Goals	Apps	Goals	Apps	Goals
Shakhtar-3	2009–10	Ukrainian Second League	15	1	0	0	0	0	0	0	0	0	15	1
Shakhtar-3	2010–11	Ukrainian Second League	12	3	0	0	0	0	0	0	0	0	12	3
Shakhtar-3	2011–12	Ukrainian Second League	0	0	0	0	0	0	0	0	0	0	0	0
Shakhtar-3	2012–13	Ukrainian Second League	22	8	0	0	0	0	0	0	0	0	22	8
Total			49	12	0	0	0	0	0	0	0	0	49	12
Zorya (loan)	2013–14	Ukrainian Premier League	10	0	0	0	0	0	0	0	0	0	10	0
Zorya (loan)	2014–15	Ukrainian Premier League	16	3	4	1	0	0	2	0	0	0	22	4
Total			26	3	4	1	0	0	2	0	0	0	32	4
Shakhtar	2015–16	Ukrainian Premier League	15	2	7	3	4	0	8	0	0	0	34	5
Shakhtar	2016–17	Ukrainian Premier League	24	1	2	0	0	0	10	1	0	0	36	2
Shakhtar	2017–18	Ukrainian Premier League	1	0	1	0	0	0	0	0	1	0	3	0
Shakhtar	2018–19	Ukrainian Premier League	3	0	0	0	0	0	1	0	0	0	4	0
Shakhtar	2019–20	Ukrainian Premier League	0	0	0	0	0	0	0	0	0	0	0	0
Total			43	3	10	3	4	0	19	1	1	0	77	7
Career total			118	18	14	4	4	0	21	1	1	0	158	23

=== International ===
As of 16 June 2021

Ukraine national team
Year	Apps	Goals
2016	2	0
2017	1	0
Total	3	0
