= Anatoliy Zhabchenko =

Ukrainian football referee

Personal information
- Full name: Anatoliy Serhiyovych Zhabchenko
- Date of birth: 23 February 1979 (age 47)
- Place of birth: Simferopol, Crimean Oblast, Ukraine SSR, Soviet Union
- Height: 1.87 m (6 ft 2 in)
- Position: Goalkeeper

Senior career*
Years	Team	Apps	(Gls)
1996	Dynamo Saky	6	(0)
1997	Dnipro-2 Dnipropetrovsk	1	(0)
1998	Rotor-Kamyshin	0	(0)
1999	Balakovo	10	(0)
Total		17	(0)

International career
1996	Ukraine U16		
Refereeing career
Domestic
Years	League	Role
2010–2017	Ukrainian Premier League	Referee
2019–	Russian PFL	Referee
2019–	Russian FNL	Referee
2019–	Russian Premier League	Referee
International
Years	League	Role
2013–2017	FIFA listed	Referee
- * Club domestic league appearances and goals

Anatoliy Serhiyovych Zhabchenko (Ukrainian: Анатоолій Сергі́йович Жабченко, born 23 February 1979) is a Ukrainian professional football referee. He has been a full international for FIFA in 2013-2017.

Due to the 2014 Russian invasion of Ukraine and annexation of Crimea, in 2014-2017 Zhabchenko represented the city of Khmelnytskyi.

During the summer of 2019, Zhabchenko was appointed as a Referee by the Russian Football Union.
