= 2016 Ukrainian Super Cup =

Dynamo Kyiv	Shakhtar Donetsk
1	1
- Dynamo Kyiv won 4–3 on penalties
- Date: 16 July 2016
- Venue: Chornomorets Stadium, Odesa
- Referee: Anatoliy Abdula
- Attendance: 26,109

The 2016 Ukrainian Super Cup became the thirteenth edition of Ukrainian Super Cup, an annual football match contested by the winners of the previous season's Ukrainian Top League and Ukrainian Cup competitions.

The match was played at the Chornomorets Stadium, Odesa, on 16 July 2016, and contested by league winner Dynamo Kyiv and cup winner Shakhtar Donetsk. Shakhtar won it on penalty shootout.

== Match ==
=== Details ===
16 July 2016

Dynamo Kyiv	1–1	Shakhtar Donetsk
Vida 80'	Report	Fred 58'
Penalties
Antunes (penalty scored); Morozyuk (penalty scored); Harmash (penalty missed); Khacheridi (penalty scored); Moraes (penalty scored)	4–3	(penalty scored) Srna; (penalty missed) Bernard; (penalty scored) Ismaily; (penalty scored) Fred; (penalty missed) Seleznyov

Chornomorets Stadium, Odesa
Attendance: 26,109
Referee: Anatoliy Abdula

Dynamo Kyiv	Shakhtar Donetsk

GK	1	(Ukraine) Oleksandr Shovkovskyi (c)
DF	24	(Croatia) Domagoj Vida	80'
DF	5	(Portugal) Vitorino Antunes
DF	6	(Austria) Aleksandar Dragović		(substituted off) 46'
DF	9	(Ukraine) Mykola Morozyuk
MF	16	(Ukraine) Serhiy Sydorchuk	(yellow card) 68'
MF	18	(Belarus) Mikita Karzun
MF	25	(Paraguay) Derlis González
MF	29	(Ukraine) Vitaliy Buyalskyi		(substituted off) 68'
MF	77	(Ukraine) Artem Hromov		(substituted off) 90+1'
FW	11	(Brazil) Júnior Moraes	(yellow card) 89'
Substitutes:
GK	72	(Ukraine) Artur Rudko
FW	7	(Ukraine) Oleksandr Hladkyi
MF	19	(Ukraine) Denys Harmash		(substituted in) 90+1'
DF	27	(Ukraine) Yevhen Makarenko
MF	32	(Ukraine) Valeriy Fedorchuk		(substituted in) 68'
DF	34	(Ukraine) Yevhen Khacheridi	(yellow card) 73'	(substituted in) 46'
MF	88	(Ukraine) Serhiy Myakushko
Manager :
	(Ukraine) Serhii Rebrov

GK	30	(Ukraine) Andriy Pyatov
DF	33	(Croatia) Darijo Srna (c)	(yellow card) 55'
DF	18	(Ukraine) Ivan Ordets
DF	38	(Ukraine) Serhiy Kryvtsov	(yellow card) 51'
DF	31	(Brazil) Ismaily
MF	6	(Ukraine) Taras Stepanenko	(yellow card) 59'
MF	7	(Brazil) Fred	58'
MF	10	(Brazil) Bernard
MF	28	(Brazil) Taison		(substituted off) 75'
MF	11	(Brazil) Marlos		(substituted off) 84'
FW	22	(Croatia) Eduardo		(substituted off) 70'
Substitutes:
GK	32	(Ukraine) Anton Kanibolotskiy
DF	2	(Ukraine) Bohdan Butko
DF	5	(Ukraine) Oleksandr Kucher
MF	12	(Brazil) Wellington Nem		(substituted in) 84'
MF	74	(Ukraine) Viktor Kovalenko		(substituted in) 75'
MF	9	(Brazil) Dentinho
FW	7	(Ukraine) Yevhen Seleznyov		(substituted in) 70'
Manager :
	(Portugal) Paulo Fonseca
