= 2016–17 FC Shakhtar Donetsk season =

Shakhtar Donetsk
2016–17 season
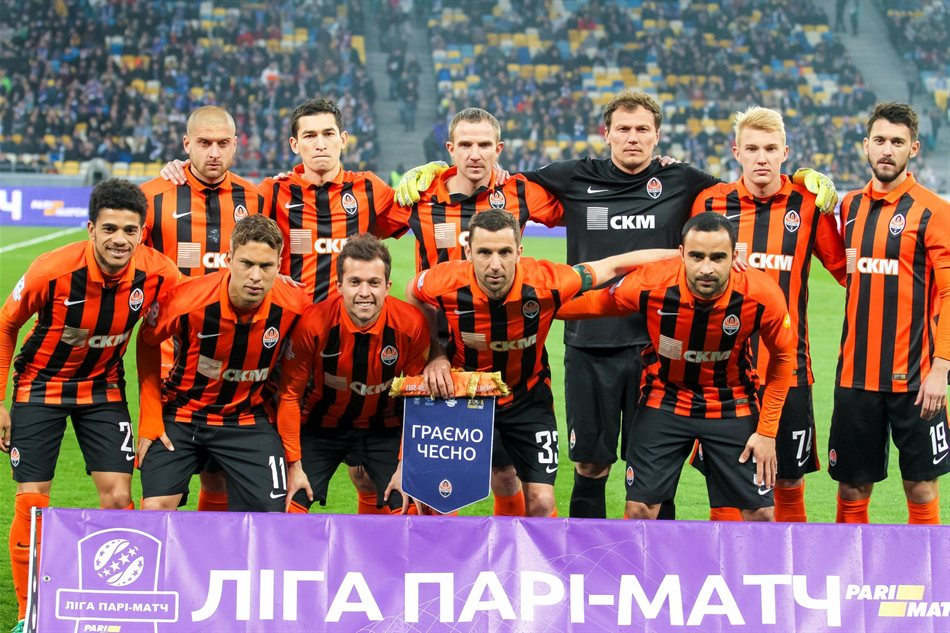
- Chairman: Rinat Akhmetov
- Manager: Paulo Fonseca
- Stadium: Donbas Arena
- Premier League: 1st
- Ukrainian Cup: Winners
- Super Cup: Runners-up
- UEFA Champions League: Third qualifying round
- UEFA Europa League: Round of 32
- Top goalscorer: League: Facundo Ferreyra (13); All: Facundo Ferreyra (16)
- Highest home attendance: 39,677 vs Dynamo Kyiv
- Lowest home attendance: 641 vs Stal Kamianske
- Average home league attendance: 10,124
| Home colours | Away colours | Third colours |

FC Shakhtar Donetsk played their 26th season in 2016–17.

== Season events ==
On 14 May 2016, Shakhtar announced the signing of Yevhen Seleznyov from Kuban Krasnodar to a two-year contract.

On 17 January, Shakhtar announced the signing of Gustavo Blanco Leschuk from Karpaty Lviv on a contract until the summer of 2020.

On 17 April, Shakhtar extended their contract with Serhiy Kryvtsov for another four seasons.

On 28 April, Shakhtar extended their contract with Yaroslav Rakitskiy for another five seasons.

On 1 May, Shakhtar extended their contract with Darijo Srna until the end of the 2017–18 season.

On 27 May, Shakhtar extended their contract with Taison for another four seasons.

On 30 May, Shakhtar extended their contract with Taras Stepanenko for another five seasons.

== Squad ==
As of match played 31 May 2017

| Number | Name | Nationality | Position | Date of birth (age) | Signed from | Signed in | Contract ends | Apps. | Goals |
Goalkeepers
| 26 | Mykyta Shevchenko | (Ukraine) | GK | 26 January 1993 (aged 24) | Academy | 2011 | | 5 | 0 |
| 30 | Andriy Pyatov | (Ukraine) | GK | 28 June 1984 (aged 32) | Vorskla Poltava | 2007 | | 341 | 0 |
| 32 | Anton Kanibolotskyi | (Ukraine) | GK | 16 May 1988 (aged 29) | Dnipro Dnipropetrovsk | 2012 | 2017 | 54 | 0 |
| 55 | Oleh Kudryk | (Ukraine) | GK | 17 October 1996 (aged 20) | Lviv | 2011 | | 1 | 0 |
Defenders
| 2 | Bohdan Butko | (Ukraine) | DF | 13 January 1991 (aged 26) | Academy | 2008 | | 16 | 1 |
| 5 | Oleksandr Kucher | (Ukraine) | DF | 22 October 1982 (aged 34) | Metalist Kharkiv | 2006 | | 293 | 11 |
| 14 | Vasyl Kobin | (Ukraine) | DF | 24 May 1985 (aged 32) | Karpaty Lviv | 2009 | | 80 | 5 |
| 18 | Ivan Ordets | (Ukraine) | DF | 8 July 1992 (aged 24) | Academy | 2009 | | 72 | 4 |
| 31 | Ismaily | (Brazil) | DF | 11 January 1990 (aged 27) | Braga | 2013 | 2017 | 91 | 7 |
| 33 | Darijo Srna (Captain) | (Croatia) | DF | 1 May 1982 (aged 35) | Hajduk Split | 2003 | 2018 | 524 | 50 |
| 38 | Serhiy Kryvtsov | (Ukraine) | DF | 15 March 1991 (aged 26) | Metalurh Zaporizhzhia | 2010 | 2021 | 96 | 8 |
| 44 | Yaroslav Rakitskyi | (Ukraine) | DF | 3 August 1989 (aged 27) | Academy | 2009 | 2022 | 275 | 12 |
| 52 | Ihor Kyryukhantsev | (Ukraine) | DF | 29 January 1996 (aged 21) | Academy | 2013 | | 1 | 0 |
| 66 | Márcio Azevedo | (Brazil) | DF | 5 February 1986 (aged 31) | Metalist Kharkiv | 2014 | 2018 | 22 | 0 |
Midfielders
| 6 | Taras Stepanenko | (Ukraine) | MF | 8 August 1989 (aged 27) | Metalurh Zaporizhzhia | 2010 | 2022 | 198 | 15 |
| 8 | Fred | (Brazil) | MF | 5 March 1993 (aged 24) | Internacional | 2013 | 2018 | 119 | 11 |
| 10 | Bernard | (Brazil) | MF | 8 September 1992 (aged 24) | Atlético Mineiro | 2013 | 2018 | 128 | 18 |
| 11 | Marlos | (Brazil) | MF | 7 June 1988 (aged 28) | Metalist Kharkiv | 2014 | 2019 | 127 | 25 |
| 17 | Maksym Malyshev | (Ukraine) | MF | 24 December 1992 (aged 24) | Academy | 2009 | | 70 | 7 |
| 20 | Giorgi Arabidze | (Georgia (country)) | MF | 4 March 1998 (aged 19) | Locomotive Tbilisi | 2015 | | 4 | 0 |
| 24 | Vyacheslav Tankovskyi | (Ukraine) | MF | 16 August 1995 (aged 21) | Academy | 2008 | | 7 | 0 |
| 28 | Taison | (Brazil) | MF | 17 January 1988 (aged 29) | Metalist Kharkiv | 2013 | 2021 | 161 | 29 |
| 29 | Alan Patrick | (Brazil) | MF | 13 May 1991 (aged 26) | Santos | 2011 | 2016 | 16 | 3 |
| 49 | Oleksandr Pikhalyonok | (Ukraine) | MF | 7 May 1997 (aged 20) | Academy | 2014 | | 1 | 0 |
| 59 | Oleksandr Zubkov | (Ukraine) | MF | 3 August 1996 (aged 20) | Olimpik Donetsk | 2011 | | 12 | 0 |
| 74 | Viktor Kovalenko | (Ukraine) | MF | 14 February 1996 (aged 21) | Academy | 2008 | | 88 | 14 |
Forwards
| 9 | Dentinho | (Brazil) | FW | 19 January 1989 (aged 28) | Corinthians | 2011 | | 104 | 14 |
| 19 | Facundo Ferreyra | (Argentina) | FW | 14 March 1991 (aged 26) | Vélez Sarsfield | 2013 | 2017 | 72 | 26 |
| 41 | Andriy Boryachuk | (Ukraine) | FW | 24 August 1987 (aged 29) | Academy | 2015 | | 14 | 5 |
| 99 | Gustavo Blanco Leschuk | (Argentina) | FW | 5 November 1991 (aged 25) | Karpaty Lviv | 2017 | 2020 | 14 | 5 |
Away on loan
| 12 | Wellington Nem | (Brazil) | MF | 6 February 1992 (aged 25) | Fluminense | 2013 | 2018 | 51 | 9 |
| 25 | Mykola Matviyenko | (Ukraine) | DF | 28 February 2000 (aged 17) | Academy | 2015 | | 9 | 0 |
| 29 | Andriy Totovytskyi | (Ukraine) | MF | 20 January 1993 (aged 24) | Academy | 2010 | | 1 | 0 |
Players who left during the season
| 7 | Yevhen Seleznyov | (Ukraine) | FW | 20 July 1991 (aged 25) | Academy | 2011 | | 65 | 28 |
| 22 | Eduardo (Note: Eduardo was born in Rio de Janeiro, Brazil, but qualified to represent Croatia in 2002, representing them between 2004 and 2014.) | (Croatia) | FW | 25 February 1983 (aged 34) | Arsenal | 2010 | 2014 | 170 | 56 |

== Transfers ==
=== In ===
| Date | Position | Nationality | Name | From | Fee | Ref. |
|---|---|---|---|---|---|---|
| 14 May 2016 | FW | (Ukraine) | Yevhen Seleznyov | Kuban Krasnodar | Undisclosed | |
| 17 January 2017 | FW | (Argentina) | Gustavo Blanco Leschuk | Karpaty Lviv | Undisclosed | |

=== Out ===
| Date | Position | Nationality | Name | To | Fee | Ref. |
|---|---|---|---|---|---|---|
| 19 July 2016 | MF | (Ukraine) | Oleksiy Polyanskyi | Persepolis | Undisclosed | |
| 19 July 2016 | FW | (Ukraine) | Andriy Kapelyan | Zirka Kropyvnytskyi | Undisclosed | |
| 29 August 2016 | MF | (Ukraine) | Dmytro Ivanisenya | Illichivets Mariupol | Undisclosed | |
| 26 December 2016 | FW | (Ukraine) | Yevhen Seleznyov | Karabükspor | Undisclosed | |
| 20 February 2017 | DF | (Ukraine) | Oleksandr Volovyk | Aktobe | Free | |
| 29 May 2017 | MF | (Ukraine) | Ruslan Malinovskyi | Genk | €3,000,000 | |

=== Loans out ===
| Date From | Position | Nationality | Name | To | Date To | Ref. |
|---|---|---|---|---|---|---|
| 1 July 2016 | FW | (Ukraine) | Pylyp Budkivskyi | Anzhi Makhachkala | 30 June 2017 | |
| 5 July 2016 | DF | (Ukraine) | Eduard Sobol | Zorya Luhansk | 30 June 2017 | |
| 6 July 2016 | MF | (Ukraine) | Ivan Petryak | Zorya Luhansk | 30 June 2017 | |
| 2 August 2016 | DF | (Ukraine) | Oleh Danchenko | Chornomorets Odesa | 30 June 2017 | |
| 2 August 2016 | MF | (Ukraine) | Vyacheslav Churko | Frosinone | 30 June 2017 | |
| 31 August 2016 | MF | (Ukraine) | Andriy Totovytskyi | Kortrijk | 30 June 2017 | |
| 1 September 2016 | MF | (Ukraine) | Serhiy Hryn | Olimpik Donetsk | 30 June 2017 | |
| 1 January 2017 | FW | (Brazil) | Wellington Nem | São Paulo | 31 December 2017 | |
| 4 January 2017 | MF | (Ukraine) | Oleksandr Karavayev | Fenerbahçe | 30 June 2017 | |

=== Released ===
| Date | Position | Nationality | Name | Joined | Date | Ref. |
|---|---|---|---|---|---|---|
| 31 August 2016 | GK | (Ukraine) | Bohdan Sarnavskyi | Ufa | 25 September 2016 | |
| 23 December 2016 | FW | (Croatia) | Eduardo | Atlético Paranaense | 1 January 2017 | |
| 27 December 2016 | DF | (Ukraine) | Vyacheslav Shevchuk | Retired | | |
| 30 December 2016 | MF | (Georgia (country)) | David Targamadze | Saburtalo Tbilisi | 1 July 2018 | |
| 30 June 2017 | GK | (Ukraine) | Anton Kanibolotskyi | Qarabağ | 1 July 2017 | |
| 30 June 2017 | DF | (Ukraine) | Oleksandr Kucher | Kayserispor | 16 August 2017 | |

== Friendlies ==
| 22 June 2016 | KIFA Pro Team (Netherlands) | 0 – 9 | (Ukraine) Shakhtar Donetsk | De Lutte, Netherlands |
| 19:00 EEST (UTC+3) | | Summary | Zubkov 3'; Bernard 9'; Totovytskyi 38', 43'; Ferreyra 48', 86'; Boryachuk 71', 80'; Malyshev (yellow card) 73'; Petryak 75' | Stadium: SV De Lutte; Attendance: 50; Referee: Wim Bronsvurt |

| 26 June 2016 | SV Meppen (Germany) | 1 – 4 | (Ukraine) Shakhtar Donetsk | Meppen, Germany |
| 15:00 EEST (UTC+3) | Wagner 17'; Vidović (yellow card) 56'; Rokar (yellow card) 69' | Summary | Zubkov 38'; Totovytskyi 55', 63'; Wellington Nem (yellow card) 68'; Marlos 82' (pen.); Bernard (yellow card) 89' | Stadium: Waldstadion; Attendance: 550; Referee: Christian Mirmen |

| 29 June 2016 | Gent (Belgium) | 0 – 2 | (Ukraine) Shakhtar Donetsk | De Lutte, Netherlands |
| 18:00 EEST (UTC+3) | | Summary | Ferreyra 27'; Dentinho 79' | Stadium: SV De Lutte; Attendance: 100; Referee: Wim Bronsvurt |

| 2 July 2016 | Vitesse (Netherlands) | 2 – 0 | (Ukraine) Shakhtar Donetsk | Loenen, Netherlands |
| 18:00 EEST (UTC+3) | Yuning 20'; Van Bergen 57'; Lucassen (yellow card) 59' | Summary | | Stadium: Voetbalclub Loenermark; Attendance: 1,100; Referee: Reinold Wiedemeijer |

| 6 July 2016 | Club Brugge (Belgium) | 2 – 2 | (Ukraine) Shakhtar Donetsk | Garderen, Netherlands |
| 19:30 EEST (UTC+3) | Storm 27'; Vossen 66' | Summary | Ordets 14'; Fred 32' (pen.) | Stadium: Sportpark De Westeneng; Attendance: 350; Referee: Gerrit Fikkert |

| 9 July 2016 | Nordsjælland (Denmark) | 1 – 3 | (Ukraine) Shakhtar Donetsk | Horst, Netherlands |
| 17:00 EEST (UTC+3) | Donyoh 89' | Summary | Bernard 27'; Eduardo 48'; Stepanenko (yellow card) 69'; Seleznyov 90' | Stadium: Stadium Horst; Attendance: 200; Referee: Alvin Stig |

| 22 January 2017 | Cracovia (Poland) | 0 – 2 | (Ukraine) Shakhtar Donetsk | La Manga, Spain |
| 11:00 EEST (UTC+3) | | Summary | Zubkov 55'; Dentinho 89' | Stadium: La Manga Club Ground; Attendance: 100; Referee: Alfonso Melgares de Aguilar |

| 27 January 2017 | Austria Wien | 2 – 2 | (Ukraine) Shakhtar Donetsk | Lagos, Portugal |
| 17:30 EEST (UTC+3) | Grünwald 18' (yellow card) 75'; Friesenbichler 41'; Holzhauser (yellow card) 64'; Filipović (yellow card) 86' | Summary | Blanco Leschuk 28'; Stepanenko (yellow card) 72'; Tankovskyi 78' | Stadium: Cascade Resorts Algarve; Attendance: 50; Referee: Tiago Cordeiro |

| 28 January 2017 | Norrköping (Sweden) | 1 – 6 | (Ukraine) Shakhtar Donetsk | Lagos, Portugal |
| 17:30 EEST (UTC+3) | Eliasson 69' | Summary | Kucher 18'; Srna 51'; Zubkov 54'; Taison 64'; Blanco Leschuk 72'; Fred 84' | Stadium: Cascade Resorts Algarve; Attendance: 50; Referee: Petr Ardeleanu (Czech Republic) |

| 31 January 2017 Atlantic Cup | Jablonec (Czech Republic) | 2 – 2 (4 – 5 p) | (Ukraine) Shakhtar Donetsk | Algarve, Portugal |
| 18:00 EEST (UTC+3) | Pospíšil 34' (pen.); Doležal 52'; Zelený (yellow card) 54' | Summary | Ferreyra 37'; Dentinho 57' | Stadium: Estádio Bela Vista; Attendance: 200; Referee: Radek Příhoda (Czech Republic) |
| | Penalties |
| | Trávník (penalty scored); Beneš (penalty scored); Mihálik (penalty scored); Lárusson (penalty scored); Mehanović (penalty scored) | | Patrick (penalty scored); Bernard (penalty scored); Dentinho (penalty scored); Blanco Leschuk (penalty scored); Stepanenko (penalty missed) |

| 1 February 2017 | Olhanense (Portugal) | 0 – 3 | (Ukraine) Shakhtar Donetsk | Lagos, Portugal |
| 17:30 EEST (UTC+3) | | Summary | Blanco Leschuk 25', 28', 51' | Stadium: Cascade Wellness Resort; Attendance: 50; Referee: Nuno Alvo |

| 3 February 2017 Atlantic Cup | Aalborg BK (Denmark) | 0 – 3 | (Ukraine) Shakhtar Donetsk | Algarve, Portugal |
| 18:00 EEST (UTC+3) | | Summary | Marlos 34', 36' (pen.); Rakitskiy (yellow card) 61'; Boryachuk 90' | Stadium: Municipal Stadium Bella Vista; Attendance: 200; Referee: Ondřej Berka (Czech Republic) |

| 4 February 2017 | Gwangju (South Korea) | 0 – 1 | (Ukraine) Shakhtar Donetsk | Lagos, Portugal |
| 17:30 EEST (UTC+3) | | Summary | Boryachuk 20' | Stadium: Cascade Resorts Algarve; Attendance: 50; Referee: Hugo Simoes |

| 7 February 2017 Atlantic Cup | Debreceni (Hungary) | 1 – 2 | (Ukraine) Shakhtar Donetsk | Algarve, Portugal |
| 21:45 EEST (UTC+3) | Feltscher 37'; Brković (yellow card) 52' | Summary | Blanco Leschuk 27'; Dentinho 29' | Stadium: Estádio Algarve; Attendance: 300; Referee: Carlos Cabral |

| 10 February 2017 | Rio Ave (Portugal) | 0 – 3 | (Ukraine) Shakhtar Donetsk | Vila do Conde, Portugal |
| 12:30 EEST (UTC+3) | | Summary | Blanco Leschuk 25'; Taison 53' (pen.); Boryachuk 81' | Stadium: Estádio dos Arcos; Attendance: 0 Referee: Robert Oliveira |

== Competitions ==
=== Overall ===
| Competition | First match | Last match | Starting round | Final position | Record | | | | | | | |
| Competition | First match | Last match | Starting round | Final position | Pld | W | D | L | GF | GA | GD | Win % |
|---|---|---|---|---|---|---|---|---|---|---|---|---|
| Premier League | 22 July 2016 | 31 May 2017 | Matchday 1 | Winners | 32 | 25 | 5 | 2 | 66 | 24 | +42 | 78.13 |
| Ukrainian Cup | 26 October 2016 | 17 May 2017 | Round of 16 | Winners | 4 | 4 | 0 | 0 | 7 | 1 | +6 | 100.00 |
| Super Cup | 16 July 2016 | | Final | Runners-up | 1 | 0 | 1 | 0 | 1 | 1 | +0 | 0.00 |
| UEFA Champions League | 26 July 2016 | 3 August 2016 | Third qualifying round | Third qualifying round | 2 | 1 | 0 | 1 | 2 | 2 | +0 | 50.00 |
| UEFA Europa League | 18 August 2016 | 23 February 2017 | Playoff Round | Last 32 | 10 | 9 | 0 | 1 | 26 | 8 | +18 | 90.00 |
| Total | | | | | 49 | 39 | 6 | 4 | 102 | 36 | +66 | 79.59 |

Last updated: 31 May 2017
Source: Results

=== Super Cup ===
| 16 July 2016 | Shakhtar Donetsk | 1 – 1 (3 – 4 p) | Dynamo Kyiv | Odesa |
| 21:00EEST (UTC+3) | Kryvtsov (yellow card) 50'; Srna (yellow card) 54'; Fred 58'; Stepanenko (yellow card) 59' | Summary | Sydorchuk (yellow card) 69'; Khacheridi (yellow card) 73'; Vida 80'; Moraes (yellow card) 89' | Stadium: Chornomorets Stadium; Attendance: 26,109; Referee: Anatoliy Abdula |
| | Penalties |
| | Srna (penalty scored); Bernard (penalty missed); Ismaily (penalty scored); Fred (penalty scored); Seleznyov (penalty missed) | | Antunes (penalty scored); Morozyuk (penalty scored); Harmash (penalty missed); Khacheridi (penalty scored); Moraes (penalty scored) |

=== Premier League ===
==== League table ====
| Pos | Team | Pld | W | D | L | GF | GA | GD | Pts | Qualification or relegation |
|---|---|---|---|---|---|---|---|---|---|---|
| 1 | Shakhtar Donetsk | 22 | 19 | 3 | 0 | 47 | 14 | +33 | 60 | Qualification for the Championship round |
| 2 | Dynamo Kyiv | 22 | 14 | 4 | 4 | 43 | 23 | +20 | 46 | Qualification for the Championship round |
| 3 | Zorya Luhansk | 22 | 12 | 4 | 6 | 34 | 21 | +13 | 40 | Qualification for the Championship round |
| 4 | Olimpik Donetsk | 22 | 9 | 7 | 6 | 28 | 30 | −2 | 34 | Qualification for the Championship round |
| 5 | FC Oleksandriya | 22 | 9 | 6 | 7 | 37 | 28 | +9 | 33 | Qualification for the Championship round |

Source: UEFA, Ukrainian Premier League, Soccerway
Rules for classification: 1) Points; 2) Goal difference; 3) Goals scored; 4) Head-to-head points; 5) Head-to-head goal difference; 6) Head-to-head goals scored; 7) Draw.

=== Championship round table ===
| Pos | Team | Pld | W | D | L | GF | GA | GD | Pts | Qualification or relegation |
|---|---|---|---|---|---|---|---|---|---|---|
| 1 | Shakhtar Donetsk (C) | 32 | 25 | 5 | 2 | 66 | 24 | +42 | 80 | Qualification for the Champions League group stage |
| 2 | Dynamo Kyiv | 32 | 21 | 4 | 7 | 69 | 33 | +36 | 67 | Qualification for the Champions League third qualifying round |
| 3 | Zorya Luhansk | 32 | 16 | 6 | 10 | 45 | 31 | +14 | 54 | Qualification for the Europa League group stage (Note: Since winners of 2016–17 Ukrainian Cup, Shakhtar Donetsk, qualified for European competition based on their league position, the spot awarded to the cup winner (Europa League group stage) was passed to the third-placed team and the spot for the third-placed team (Europa League third qualifying round) was passed to the fifth-placed team.) |
| 4 | Olimpik Donetsk | 32 | 11 | 11 | 10 | 33 | 44 | −11 | 44 | Qualification for the Europa League third qualifying round |
| 5 | FC Oleksandriya | 32 | 10 | 10 | 12 | 41 | 43 | −2 | 40 | Qualification for the Europa League third qualifying round |
| 6 | Chornomorets Odesa | 32 | 10 | 8 | 14 | 25 | 37 | −12 | 38 | |

Source: UEFA, Ukrainian Premier League, Soccerway
Rules for classification: 1) Points; 2) Goal difference; 3) Goals scored; 4) Head-to-head points; 5) Head-to-head goal difference; 6) Head-to-head goals scored; 7) Draw.
(C) Champions

==== Results summary ====
| Overall | | | | | | | | Home | | | | | | Away | | | | | |
| Pld | W | D | L | GF | GA | GD | Pts | W | D | L | GF | GA | GD | W | D | L | GF | GA | GD |
|---|---|---|---|---|---|---|---|---|---|---|---|---|---|---|---|---|---|---|---|
| 32 | 25 | 5 | 2 | 66 | 24 | +42 | 80 | 11 | 3 | 2 | 31 | 13 | +18 | 14 | 2 | 0 | 35 | 11 | +24 |

==== Results by round ====
| Round | 1 | 2 | 3 | 4 | 5 | 6 | 7 | 8 | 9 | 10 | 11 | 12 | 13 | 14 | 15 | 16 | 17 | 18 | 19 | 20 | 21 | 22 | 23 | 24 | 25 | 26 | 27 | 28 | 29 | 30 | 31 | 32 |
|---|---|---|---|---|---|---|---|---|---|---|---|---|---|---|---|---|---|---|---|---|---|---|---|---|---|---|---|---|---|---|---|---|
| Ground | H | A | H | A | H | A | H | A | H | H | A | A | H | A | H | A | H | A | H | A | A | H | A | H | A | A | H | H | A | H | H | A |
| Result | W | W | W | W | W | W | D | W | W | W | D | W | W | W | W | W | W | W | W | W | W | D | W | L | W | W | W | W | W | D | L | D |
| Position | 3 | 1 | 1 | 1 | 1 | 1 | 1 | 1 | 1 | 1 | 1 | 1 | 1 | 1 | 1 | 1 | 1 | 1 | 1 | 1 | 1 | 1 | 1 | 1 | 1 | 1 | 1 | 1 | 1 | 1 | 1 | 1 |

Updated to match(es) played on 25 July 2016. Source: Socceraway
A = Away; H = Home; W = Win; D = Draw; L = Loss

==== Results ====
| 22 July 2016 1 | Shakhtar Donetsk | 4 – 1 | Zirka Kropyvnytskyi | Lviv |
| 19:00 EEST (UTC+3) | Bernard 3'; Taison 32'; Fred (yellow card) 37'; Eduardo 45'; Srna (yellow card) 48'; Kovalyov 70' (o.g.); Stepanenko (yellow card) 84' | Summary | Kucherenko (yellow card) 21'; Sitalo 38'; Dopilka (yellow card) 39'; Batsula (yellow card) 44' | Stadium: Arena Lviv; Attendance: 1,536; Referee: Yevhen Aranovskyi |

| 30 July 2016 2 | Chornomorets Odesa | 1 – 4 | Shakhtar Donetsk | Odesa |
| 19:30 EEST (UTC+3) | Filimonov 61'; Andriyevskyi (yellow card) 87'; Khocholava (yellow card) 90+4' | Summary | Seleznyov (yellow card) 32', (goal) 51'; Fred 59'; Rakitskiy (yellow card) 71'; Eduardo 90+1'; Kovalenko 90+2' | Stadium: Chornomorets Stadium; Attendance: 12,144; Referee: Yaroslav Kozyk |

| 7 August 2016 3 | Shakhtar Donetsk | 1 – 0 | Oleksandriya | Lviv |
| 19:30 EEST (UTC+3) | Kovalenko (yellow card) 20'; Ismaily 36' | Summary | Starenkyi (yellow card) 12'; Basov (yellow card) 69' | Stadium: Arena Lviv; Attendance: 1,436; Referee: Sergiy Berezka |

| 12 August 2016 4 | Karpaty Lviv | 2 – 3 | Shakhtar Donetsk | Lviv |
| 20:00 EEST (UTC+3) | Blanco Leschuk 27', (yellow card) 63'; Novotryasov (yellow card) 31'; Lobay (yellow card) 34'; Chachua 37'; Miroshnichenko (yellow card) 65'; Khudobyak (yellow card) 83' | Summary | Stepanenko 47', (yellow card) 83'; Kovalenko 68'; Marlos 87'; Taison (yellow card) 90' | Stadium: Arena Lviv; Attendance: 6,743; Referee: Kostyantin Trukhanov |

| 21 August 2016 5 | Shakhtar Donetsk | 4 – 0 | Dnipro Dnipropetrovsk | Lviv |
| 17:00 EEST (UTC+3) | Ordets 13'; Dentinho 14'; Marlos 71'; Stepanenko (yellow card) 86'; Ferreyra 89' | Summary | | Stadium: Arena Lviv; Attendance: 3,358; Referee: Mykola Balakin |

| 28 August 2016 6 | Stal Dniprodzerzhynsk | 0 – 1 | Shakhtar Donetsk | Dnipropetrovsk |
| 19:30 EEST (UTC+3) | Kalenchuk (yellow card) 59'; Stamenković (yellow card) 73' | Summary | Dentinho (yellow card) 2'; Malyshev (yellow card) 58'; Ferreyra 78'; Fred (yellow card) 90'; Wellington Nem (yellow card) 90+4' | Stadium: Meteor Stadium; Attendance: 2,502; Referee: Yury Vaks |

| 9 September 2016 7 | Shakhtar Donetsk | 1 – 1 | Dynamo Kyiv | Kharkiv |
| 21:00 EEST (UTC+3) | Stepanenko (yellow card) 43'; Fred (yellow card) 60'; Rakitskiy (yellow card) 63'; Dentinho 75'; Ferreyra (yellow card) 90+7' | Summary | Sydorchuk (yellow card) 21'; Husyev 24' (pen.); Yarmolenko (yellow card) 72'; Harmash (yellow card) 73'; Fedorchuk (yellow card) 88'; Morozyuk (yellow card) 89'; Moraes (yellow card) 90+5'; Khacheridi (yellow card) 90+7' | Stadium: OSC Metalist; Attendance: 39,677; Referee: Anatoliy Abdula |

| 18 September 2016 8 | Vorskla Poltava | 0 – 1 | Shakhtar Donetsk | Poltava |
| 19:30 EEST (UTC+3) | Dytyatev (yellow card) 28'; Perduta (yellow card) 90+5'; Sklyar (yellow card) 90+5' | Summary | Fred (yellow card) 32'; Taison 54'; Kobin (yellow card) 90+4'; Dentinho (yellow card) 90+6' | Stadium: Vorskla Stadium; Attendance: 11,000; Referee: Ihor Paskhal |

| 24 September 2016 9 | Shakhtar Donetsk | 3 – 0 | Volyn Lutsk | Lviv |
| 17:00 EEST (UTC+3) | Kychak 41' (o.g.); Ordets 60'; Boryachuk 78' | Summary | Herasymyuk (yellow card) 57' | Stadium: Arena Lviv; Attendance: 1,678; Referee: Kateryna Monzul |

| 2 October 2016 10 | Shakhtar Donetsk | 1 – 0 | Zorya Luhansk | Zaporizhia |
| 17:00 EEST (UTC+3) | Ordets (yellow card) 54'; Ferreyra 56', (yellow card) 65'; Rakitskiy (yellow card) 69' | Summary | Sivakov (yellow card) 43'; Sukhotskyi (yellow card) 60'; Chaykovskyi (yellow card) 67' | Stadium: Slavutych-Arena; Attendance: 11,117; Referee: Mykola Balakin |

| 15 October 2016 11 | Olimpik Donetsk | 1 – 1 | Shakhtar Donetsk | Sumy |
| 17:00 EEST (UTC+3) | Oliynyk (yellow card) 76'; Matyazh 79'; Partsvania (yellow card) 85' | Summary | Ferreyra (yellow card) 37'; Ordets 73' | Stadium: Yuvileiny Stadium; Attendance: 9,230; Referee: Yury Vaks |

| 23 October 2016 12 | Zirka Kropyvnytskyi | 0 – 3 | Shakhtar Donetsk | Kropyvnytskyi |
| 19:30 EEST (UTC+3) | Moya (yellow card) 31'; Kovalyov (yellow card) 42'; Bayenko (yellow card) 44'; Kucherenko (yellow card) 79'; Sitalo (yellow card) 84' | Summary | Fred (yellow card) 29'; Pereyra 35' (o.g.); Boryachuk (yellow card) 40' (goal) 73'; Malyshev (yellow card) 51'; Ferreyra 90'; Rakitskiy (yellow card) 90+4'; Bernard (yellow card) 90+4' | Stadium: Zirka Stadium; Attendance: 8,056; Referee: Anatoliy Zhabchenko |

| 30 October 2016 13 | Shakhtar Donetsk | 2 – 0 | Chornomorets Odesa | Lviv |
| 17:00 | Bernard (yellow card) 13'; Ferreyra 24'; Dentinho 30'; Malyshev (yellow card) 79' | Summary | Tatarkov (yellow card) 14'; Smirnov (yellow card) 44'; Lyulka (yellow card) 65'; Khocholava (yellow card) 66'; Musolitin (yellow card) 75'; Kabayev (yellow card) 90+1' | Stadium: Arena Lviv; Attendance: 1,948; Referee: Kostyantin Trukhanov |

| 6 November 2016 14 | Oleksandriya | 1 – 2 | Shakhtar Donetsk | Oleksandriya |
| 19:30 | Tsurikov (yellow card) 27'; Yaremchuk (yellow card) 31' (goal) 46'; Shendrik (yellow card) 62'; Polyarus (yellow card) 78' | Summary | Dentinho 12'; Ferreyra 24'; Srna (yellow card) 45+1'; Fred (yellow card) 70'; Bernard (yellow card) 80'; Ismaily (yellow card) 90+2' | Stadium: CSC Nika; Attendance: 2,786; Referee: Yury Vaks |

| 19 November 2016 15 | Shakhtar Donetsk | 2 – 1 | Karpaty Lviv | Kharkiv |
| 17:00 | Srna 10' (yellow card) 65'; Malyshev (yellow card) 16'; Pyatov (yellow card) 18'; Bernard (yellow card) 42'; Ferreyra 77' | Summary | Ksyonz 19' (pen.) (yellow card) 39' (yellow-red card) 47'; Zubeyko (yellow card) 59' | Stadium: OSC Metalist; Attendance: 10,611; Referee: Sergiy Boyko |

| 27 November 2016 16 | Dnipro Dnipropetrovsk | 0 – 2 | Shakhtar Donetsk | Dnipropetrovsk |
| 19:30 | | Summary | Kovalenko 36', 39' | Stadium: Dnipro-Arena; Attendance: 5,493; Referee: Yaroslav Kozyk |

| 4 December 2016 17 | Shakhtar Donetsk | 2 – 0 | Stal Dniprodzerzhynsk | Lviv |
| 17:00 | Marlos 31' (pen.); Eduardo (yellow card) 57'; Taison 79' | Summary | Kalenchuk (yellow card) 65' | Stadium: Arena Lviv; Attendance: 641; Referee: Yury Grisjo |

| 11 December 2016 18 | Dynamo Kyiv | 3 – 4 | Shakhtar Donetsk | Kyiv |
| 19:00 | Moraes 1' (red card) 60'; Rybalka 30' (yellow card) 56' (yellow-red card) 90+5'; Burda (yellow card) 53'; González (yellow card) 64'; Besyedin 90+2' | Summary | Khacheridi 3', 88' (o.g.); Stepanenko (yellow card) 28'; Fred 50' (yellow card) 87'; Ferreyra 58'; Kucher (yellow card) 61'; Srna (yellow card) 65'; Dentinho (yellow card) 90+5' | Stadium: NSC Olimpiyskiy; Attendance: 21,318; Referee: Anatoliy Zhabchenko |

| 26 February 2017 19 | Shakhtar Donetsk | 2 – 1 | Vorskla Poltava | Kharkiv |
| 17:00 | Bernard (yellow card) 38'; Kovalenko (yellow card) 60' (goal) 63'; Ferreyra 90+1' (yellow card) 90+2' | Summary | Khlyobas 27'; Shust (yellow card) 74'; Zarichnyuk (yellow card) 83' (yellow-red card) 90+3'; Odaryuk (yellow card) 85' | Stadium: OSC Metalist; Attendance: 5,058; Referee: Dmytro Kutakov |

| 5 March 2017 20 | Volyn Lutsk | 0 – 1 | Shakhtar Donetsk | Lutsk |
| 19:30 | Lyashenko (yellow card) 32'; Shapoval (yellow card) 37' | Summary | Kovalenko 66'; Rakitskiy (yellow card) 72' | Stadium: Avanhard Stadium; Attendance: 7,450; Referee: Sergiy Berezka |

| 12 March 2017 21 | Zorya Luhansk | 1 – 2 | Shakhtar Donetsk | Kharkiv |
| 19:30 | Kharatin (yellow card) 40' (goal) 60'; Chaykovskyi (yellow card) 44' | Summary | Srna (yellow card) 22'; Bernard 26'; Kucher (yellow card) 78'; Malyshev 88'; Taison (yellow card) 90+2' | Stadium: OSC Metalist; Attendance: 8,209; Referee: Oleksandr Derdo |

| 17 March 2017 22 | Shakhtar Donetsk | 1 – 1 | Olimpik Donetsk | Kharkiv |
| 19:00 | Bernard (yellow card) 36'; Blanco Leschuk 45+1'; Marlos (yellow card) 90+6' | Summary | Postupalenko (yellow card) 21' (goal) 24'; Matyazh (yellow card) 62'; Fedoriv (yellow card) 90+6' | Stadium: OSC Metalist; Attendance: 3,836; Referee: Yevhen Aranovskyi |

| 2 April 2017 23 | Zorya Luhansk | 1 – 2 | Shakhtar Donetsk | Zaporizhia |
| 19:30 | Sukhotskyi (yellow card) 16'; Bonaventure 31'; Checher (yellow card) 44'; Chaykovskyi (yellow card) 81' | Summary | Ordets (yellow card) 12'; Blanco Leschuk 36'; Ismaily (yellow card) 53'; Rakitskiy (yellow card) 56' (yellow-red card) 86'; Taison 63'; Srna (yellow card) 69'; Malyshev (yellow card) 90+2'; Pyatov (yellow card) 90+5' | Stadium: Slavutych-Arena; Attendance: 9,500; Referee: Dmytro Kutakov |

| 9 April 2017 24 | Shakhtar Donetsk | 1 – 2 | Chornomorets Odesa | Kharkiv |
| 17:00 | Bernard 27' (yellow card) 90+4'; Stepanenko (yellow card) 71'; Ferreyra (yellow card) 90+5' | Summary | Khocholava (yellow card) 26'; Andriyevskyi 37' (yellow card) 76'; Khoblenko (yellow card) 39'; Sílvio (yellow card) 41'; Elias 68'; Kanevtsev (yellow card) 78'; Mashnin (yellow card) 90+3'; Kovalets (yellow card) 90+4' | Stadium: OSC Metalist; Attendance: 7,131; Referee: Yuri Mozharovskiy |

| 15 April 2017 25 | Olimpik Donetsk | 0 – 4 | Shakhtar Donetsk | Kyiv |
| 17:00 | Tsymbalyuk (yellow card) 77' | Summary | Bernard 7'; Taison 37'; Kovalenko 58'; Ferreyra 61' (pen.) | Stadium: Valeriy Lobanovskyi Dynamo Stadium; Attendance: 1,950; Referee: Sergiy Berezka |

| 21 April 2017 26 | Dynamo Kyiv | 0 – 1 | Shakhtar Donetsk | Kyiv |
| 20:00 | Morozyuk (yellow card) 50'; Sydorchuk (yellow card) 54'; Harmash (yellow card) 56' | Summary | Ferreyra 12' (yellow card) 90+3'; Marlos (yellow card) 74' | Stadium: NSC Olimpiyskiy; Attendance: 51,732; Referee: Kostyantin Trukhanov |

| 30 April 2017 27 | Shakhtar Donetsk | 1 – 0 | Oleksandriya | Kharkiv |
| 17:00 | Rakitskiy (yellow card) 15'; Kucher (yellow card) 31'; Dentinho (yellow card) 65'; Taison (yellow card) 68'; Ferreyra 81' (yellow card) 87' | Summary | Polyarus (yellow card) 33'; Tsurikov (yellow card) 38'; Basov (yellow card) 47'; Chebotayev (yellow card) 58'; Siminin (yellow card) 68' | Stadium: OSC Metalist; Attendance: 6,114; Referee: Yaroslav Kozyk |

| 6 May 2017 28 | Shakhtar Donetsk | 3 – 2 | Zorya Luhansk | Kharkiv |
| 17:00 | Ferreyra 38'; Ismaily 52'; Ordets 55'; Marlos (yellow card) 73'; Srna (yellow card) 86' | Summary | Opanasenko (yellow card) 37'; Kharatin (yellow card) 43' (goal) 80'; Babenko (yellow card) 86'; Bonaventure 88' (yellow card) 90+1'; Pylyavskyi (yellow card) 90+5' | Stadium: OSC Metalist; Attendance: 12,157; Referee: Yuri Mozharovskiy |

| 13 May 2017 29 | Chornomorets Odesa | 0 – 3 | Shakhtar Donetsk | Odesa |
| 19:30 | | Summary | Ablitarov 29' (o.g.); Blanco Leschuk 37', 89'; Kobin (yellow card) 80' | Stadium: Chornomorets Stadium; Attendance: 9,658; Referee: Mykola Kryvonosov |

| 21 May 2017 30 | Shakhtar Donetsk | 1 – 1 | Olimpik Donetsk | Kyiv |
| 17:00 | Butko 50' (yellow card) 79'; Ordets (yellow card) 59'; Kryvtsov (yellow card) 64'; Azevedo (yellow card) 73' | Summary | Serhiychuk 12'; Shestakov (yellow card) 89' | Stadium: Valeriy Lobanovskyi Dynamo Stadium; Attendance: 6,631; Referee: Dmytro Kutakov |

| 26 May 2017 31 | Shakhtar Donetsk | 2 – 3 | Dynamo Kyiv | Kharkiv |
| 19:30 | Patrick 23'; Dentinho 58'; Tankovskyi (yellow card) 64'; Marlos (yellow card) 90+3' | Summary | Harmash 20' (yellow card) 34'; Yarmolenko 52' (pen.), 71'; Antunes (yellow card) 87'; Shepelyev (yellow card) 90' | Stadium: OSC Metalist; Attendance: 12,664; Referee: Oleksandr Derdo |

| 31 May 2017 32 | Oleksandriya | 1 – 1 | Shakhtar Donetsk | Oleksandriya |
| 19:00 | Starenkyi 23' | Summary | Boryachuk 19' | Stadium: CSC Nika; Attendance: 5,826; Referee: Yuri Mozharovskiy |

=== Ukrainian Cup ===
| 26 October 2016 Round of 16 | Shakhtar Donetsk | 2 – 1 | Oleksandriya | Lviv |
| 19:30 EEST (UTC+3) | Stepanenko 13'; Dentinho (yellow card) 88'; Marlos 90+2' | Summary | Leonov (yellow card) 15'; Chorniy (yellow card) 62'; Basov (yellow card) 88'; Yaremchuk 90+4' | Stadium: Arena Lviv; Attendance: 1,210; Referee: Oleksandr Derdo |

| 5 April 2017 Quarter-final | FC Poltava | – + | Shakhtar Donetsk | Poltava |
| 14:00 EEST (UTC+3) | | Summary | | Stadium: Lokomotov Stadium; Referee: Kateryna Monzul |

| 26 April 2017 Semi-final | Shakhtar Donetsk | 1 – 0 | Dnipro Dnipropetrovsk | Kharkiv |
| 20:00EEST (UTC+3) | Taison 66'; Shevchenko (yellow card) 90+2' | Summary | Vakulko (yellow card) 57'; Svatok (yellow card) 82' | Stadium: OSC Metalist; Attendance: 4,751; Referee: Oleksandr Derdo |

| 17 May 2017 Final | Shakhtar Donetsk | 1 – 0 | Dynamo Kyiv | Kharkiv |
| 21:00EEST (UTC+3) | Srna (yellow card) 55'; Ferreyra (yellow card) 77'; Marlos 80'; Pyatov (yellow card) 90+4' | Summary | Sydorchuk (yellow card) 54'; Kádár (yellow card) 77'; Harmash (yellow card) 90+3' | Stadium: OSC Metalist; Attendance: 25,500; Referee: Kostyantin Trukhanov |

=== UEFA Champions League ===
==== Qualifying round ====
| 26 July 2016 Third qualifying round 1st leg | Shakhtar Donetsk (Ukraine) | 2 – 0 | (Switzerland) Young Boys | Lviv, Ukraine |
| 21:45 EEST (UTC+3) | Bernard 27'; Seleznyov 75' | Report | Vilotić (yellow card) 23' (yellow-red card) 55'; Hoarau (yellow card) 70'; Bertone (yellow card) 88' | Stadium: Arena Lviv; Attendance: 7,477; Referee: Serdar Gözübüyük (Netherlands) |

| 3 August 2016 Third qualifying round 2nd leg | Young Boys (Switzerland) | 2 – 0 (2 – 2 agg.) (4–2 p) | (Ukraine) Shakhtar Donetsk | Bern, Switzerland |
| 21:45 EEST (UTC+3) | Kubo (yellow card) 11', (goal) 54', 60'; Rochat (yellow card) 15'; Hoarau (yellow card) 52'; Sanogo (yellow card) 90'; Sutter (yellow card) 96' | Report | Stepanenko (yellow card) 65'; Fred (yellow card) 71'; Taison (yellow card) 80' | Stadium: Stade de Suisse; Attendance: 9,365; Referee: Ruddy Buquet (France) |
| | Penalties |
| | Hoarau (penalty scored); Kubo (penalty scored); Hadergjonaj (penalty missed); Rochat (penalty scored); Gajić (penalty scored) | | (penalty scored) Srna; (penalty missed) Fred; (penalty missed) Rakitskiy; (penalty scored) Marlos |

=== UEFA Europa League ===
==== Play-off round ====
| 18 August 2016 Playoff round 1st leg | İstanbul Başakşehir (Turkey) | 1 – 2 | (Ukraine) Shakhtar Donetsk | Istanbul, Turkey |
| 20:30 EEST (UTC+3) | Belözoğlu 56' (pen.); Tekdemir (yellow card) 81'; Mossoró (yellow card) 85' | Report | Cikalleshi 24' (o.g.); Kovalenko 41'; Ismaily (yellow card) 88' | Stadium: Başakşehir Fatih Terim Stadium; Attendance: 3,016; Referee: Javier Estrada Fernández (Spain) |

| 25 August 2016 Playoff Round 2nd leg | Shakhtar Donetsk (Ukraine) | 2 – 0 (4 – 1 agg.) | (Turkey) İstanbul Başakşehir | Lviv, Ukraine |
| 22:00 EEST (UTC+3) | Attamah 22' (o.g.); Fred (yellow card) 36'; Marlos 71' (pen.); Eduardo (yellow card) 85' | Report | Rotman (yellow card) 59'; Albayrak (yellow card) 64'; Uçar (yellow card) 69'; Holmén (yellow card) 78'; Mossoró (yellow card) 83' | Stadium: Arena Lviv; Attendance: 7,014; Referee: Ivan Kružliak (Slovakia) |

==== Group stage ====
| Pos | Team | Pld | W | D | L | GF | GA | GD | Pts | Qualification |
|---|---|---|---|---|---|---|---|---|---|---|
| 1 | (Ukraine) Shakhtar Donetsk | 6 | 6 | 0 | 0 | 21 | 5 | +16 | 18 | Advance to knockout phase |
| 2 | (Belgium) Gent | 6 | 2 | 2 | 2 | 9 | 13 | −4 | 8 | Advance to knockout phase |
| 3 | (Portugal) Braga | 6 | 1 | 3 | 2 | 9 | 11 | −2 | 6 | |
| 4 | (Turkey) Konyaspor | 6 | 0 | 1 | 5 | 2 | 12 | −10 | 1 | |

Source: UEFA
Rules for classification: Group stage tiebreakers

| 15 September 2016 1 | Konyaspor (Turkey) | 0 – 1 | (Ukraine) Shakhtar Donetsk | Konya, Turkey |
| 22:05 EEST (UTC+3) | Turan (yellow card) 11'; Bajić (yellow card) 15' | Report | Fred (yellow card) 74'; Ferreyra 76' | Stadium: Torku Arena; Attendance: 26,860; Referee: Robert Schörgenhofer (Austria) |

| 29 September 2016 2 | Shakhtar Donetsk (Ukraine) | 2 – 0 | (Portugal) Braga | Lviv, Ukraine |
| 20:00 EEST (UTC+3) | Stepanenko 5', (yellow card) 64'; Fred (yellow card) 25' (yellow-red card) 47'; Kovalenko 56'; Kucher (yellow card) 82' | Report | Vukčević (yellow card) 54'; Santos (yellow card) 63'; Stojiljković (yellow card) 82' | Stadium: Arena Lviv; Attendance: 11,938; Referee: Tobias Stieler (Germany) |

| 20 October 2016 3 | Shakhtar Donetsk (Ukraine) | 5 – 0 | (Belgium) Gent | Lviv, Ukraine |
| 20:00 EEST (UTC+3) | Kovalenko 12'; Ferreyra 30'; Bernard 46'; Taison 75'; Malyshev 85'; Eduardo (yellow card) 90' | Report | Asare (yellow card) 37' | Stadium: Arena Lviv; Attendance: 10,505; Referee: Anthony Taylor (England) |

| 3 November 2016 4 | Gent (Belgium) | 3 – 5 | (Ukraine) Shakhtar Donetsk | Ghent, Belgium |
| 22:05 EEST (UTC+3) | Coulibaly 1'; Perbet 83'; Milićević 89' | Report | Marlos 36' (pen.); Taison 41'; Stepanenko (yellow card) 43' (goal) 45+3'; Fred 68'; Ferreyra 87' | Stadium: Ghelamco Arena; Attendance: 14,526; Referee: Aleksei Kulbakov (Belarus) |

| 24 November 2016 5 | Shakhtar Donetsk (Ukraine) | 4 – 0 | (Turkey) Konyaspor | Lviv, Ukraine |
| 20:00 EET (UTC+2) | Bardakcı 11' (o.g.); Boryachuk (yellow card) 12'; Kovalenko (yellow card) 28'; Dentinho 36'; Srna (yellow card) 37'; Eduardo 66'; Bernard 74'; Stepanenko (yellow card) 86' | Report | | Stadium: Arena Lviv; Attendance: 10,021; Referee: Kevin Clancy (Scotland) |

| 8 December 2016 6 | Braga (Portugal) | 2 – 4 | (Ukraine) Shakhtar Donetsk | Braga, Portugal |
| 18:00 EET (UTC+2) | Stojiljković 43'; Vukčević (yellow card) 75' (goal) 89' | Report | Kryvtsov 22', 62' (yellow card) 67'; Taison 39', 66' (yellow card) 74'; Tankovskyi (yellow card) 57'; Dentinho (yellow card) 75' | Stadium: Estádio Municipal, Braga; Attendance: 15,084; Referee: Ali Palabıyık (Turkey) |

==== Knockout phase ====
| 16 February 2017 Last 32 First Leg | Celta (Spain) | 0 – 1 | (Ukraine) Shakhtar Donetsk | Vigo, Spain |
| 20:00 EET (UTC+2) | Radoja (yellow card) 67'; Wass (yellow card) 71'; Aspas (yellow card) 75' | Summary | Blanco Leschuk 27'; Ordets (yellow card) 41'; Taison (yellow card) 45+1'; Srna (yellow card) 45+4'; Malyshev (yellow card) 75'; Rakitskiy (yellow card) 81' | Stadium: Balaídos, Vigo; Attendance: 18,318; Referee: Gediminas Mažeika (Lithuania) |

| 23 February 2017 Last 32 Second Leg | Shakhtar Donetsk (Ukraine) | 0 – 2 (1 – 2 agg.) | (Spain) Celta | Kharkiv, Ukraine |
| 22:05 EET (UTC+2) | Blanco Leschuk (yellow card) 36'; Rakitskiy (yellow card) 90'; Fred (yellow card) 90+3'; Srna (yellow card) 119' | Summary | Aspas (yellow card) 13' (goal) 90+1' (pen.); Roncaglia (yellow card) 26'; Jonny (yellow card) 63'; Cabral 108'; Guidetti (yellow card) 113'; Bongonda (yellow card) 116' | Stadium: OSC Metalist; Attendance: 33,117; Referee: Slavko Vinčić (Slovenia) |

== Squad statistics ==
As of match played 31 May 2017

=== Appearances and goals ===
| No. | Pos | Nat | Player | Total | | Premier League | | Ukrainian Cup | | UEFA Champions League | | UEFA Europa League | | Supercup | |
| No. | Pos | Nat | Player | Apps | Goals | Apps | Goals | Apps | Goals | Apps | Goals | Apps | Goals | Apps | Goals |
|---|---|---|---|---|---|---|---|---|---|---|---|---|---|---|---|
| 2 | DF | (Ukraine) UKR | Bohdan Butko | 16 | 1 | 10+1 | 1 | 2 | 0 | 0 | 0 | 3 | 0 | 0 | 0 |
| 5 | DF | (Ukraine) UKR | Oleksandr Kucher | 29 | 0 | 20+2 | 0 | 1 | 0 | 0 | 0 | 6 | 0 | 0 | 0 |
| 6 | MF | (Ukraine) UKR | Taras Stepanenko | 40 | 4 | 20+7 | 1 | 2+1 | 1 | 1 | 0 | 6+2 | 2 | 1 | 0 |
| 8 | MF | (Brazil) BRA | Fred | 29 | 4 | 18 | 2 | 0 | 0 | 2 | 0 | 7+1 | 1 | 1 | 1 |
| 9 | FW | (Brazil) BRA | Dentinho | 33 | 6 | 11+12 | 5 | 1+1 | 0 | 1+1 | 0 | 3+3 | 1 | 0 | 0 |
| 10 | MF | (Brazil) BRA | Bernard | 37 | 7 | 20+4 | 4 | 2+1 | 0 | 1 | 1 | 5+3 | 2 | 1 | 0 |
| 11 | MF | (Brazil) BRA | Marlos | 44 | 7 | 26+3 | 3 | 3 | 2 | 2 | 0 | 9 | 2 | 1 | 0 |
| 14 | DF | (Ukraine) UKR | Vasyl Kobin | 2 | 0 | 1+1 | 0 | 0 | 0 | 0 | 0 | 0 | 0 | 0 | 0 |
| 17 | MF | (Ukraine) UKR | Maksym Malyshev | 36 | 2 | 14+10 | 1 | 1+1 | 0 | 0 | 0 | 5+5 | 1 | 0 | 0 |
| 18 | DF | (Ukraine) UKR | Ivan Ordets | 31 | 4 | 18+2 | 4 | 1+1 | 0 | 2 | 0 | 5+1 | 0 | 1 | 0 |
| 19 | FW | (Argentina) ARG | Facundo Ferreyra | 28 | 16 | 13+7 | 13 | 1 | 0 | 0 | 0 | 6+1 | 3 | 0 | 0 |
| 20 | FW | (Georgia (country)) GEO | Giorgi Arabidze | 1 | 0 | 1 | 0 | 0 | 0 | 0 | 0 | 0 | 0 | 0 | 0 |
| 24 | MF | (Ukraine) UKR | Vyacheslav Tankovskyi | 7 | 0 | 4 | 0 | 1 | 0 | 0 | 0 | 2 | 0 | 0 | 0 |
| 26 | GK | (Ukraine) UKR | Mykyta Shevchenko | 5 | 0 | 2 | 0 | 1 | 0 | 0 | 0 | 2 | 0 | 0 | 0 |
| 28 | MF | (Brazil) BRA | Taison | 40 | 10 | 18+6 | 5 | 3 | 1 | 2 | 0 | 7+3 | 4 | 1 | 0 |
| 29 | MF | (Brazil) BRA | Alan Patrick | 10 | 1 | 3+6 | 1 | 1 | 0 | 0 | 0 | 0 | 0 | 0 | 0 |
| 30 | GK | (Ukraine) UKR | Andriy Pyatov | 40 | 0 | 28 | 0 | 1 | 0 | 2 | 0 | 8 | 0 | 1 | 0 |
| 31 | DF | (Brazil) BRA | Ismaily | 40 | 2 | 27+1 | 2 | 1 | 0 | 2 | 0 | 8 | 0 | 1 | 0 |
| 32 | GK | (Ukraine) UKR | Anton Kanibolotskyi | 2 | 0 | 1 | 0 | 1 | 0 | 0 | 0 | 0 | 0 | 0 | 0 |
| 33 | DF | (Croatia) CRO | Darijo Srna | 34 | 1 | 23 | 1 | 1 | 0 | 2 | 0 | 7 | 0 | 1 | 0 |
| 38 | DF | (Ukraine) UKR | Serhiy Kryvtsov | 13 | 2 | 5+1 | 0 | 2 | 0 | 2 | 0 | 2 | 2 | 1 | 0 |
| 41 | FW | (Ukraine) UKR | Andriy Boryachuk | 11 | 3 | 2+5 | 3 | 1 | 0 | 0 | 0 | 2+1 | 0 | 0 | 0 |
| 44 | DF | (Ukraine) UKR | Yaroslav Rakitskiy | 31 | 0 | 21 | 0 | 2 | 0 | 0+1 | 0 | 7 | 0 | 0 | 0 |
| 49 | MF | (Ukraine) UKR | Oleksandr Pikhalyonok | 1 | 0 | 0+1 | 0 | 0 | 0 | 0 | 0 | 0 | 0 | 0 | 0 |
| 52 | DF | (Ukraine) UKR | Ihor Kyryukhantsev | 1 | 0 | 0+1 | 0 | 0 | 0 | 0 | 0 | 0 | 0 | 0 | 0 |
| 55 | GK | (Ukraine) UKR | Oleh Kudryk | 1 | 0 | 1 | 0 | 0 | 0 | 0 | 0 | 0 | 0 | 0 | 0 |
| 59 | MF | (Ukraine) UKR | Oleksandr Zubkov | 10 | 0 | 3+5 | 0 | 0+2 | 0 | 0 | 0 | 0 | 0 | 0 | 0 |
| 66 | DF | (Brazil) BRA | Márcio Azevedo | 5 | 0 | 3 | 0 | 1 | 0 | 0 | 0 | 0+1 | 0 | 0 | 0 |
| 74 | MF | (Ukraine) UKR | Viktor Kovalenko | 38 | 10 | 21+7 | 7 | 1 | 0 | 0 | 0 | 7+1 | 3 | 0+1 | 0 |
| 99 | FW | (Argentina) ARG | Gustavo Blanco Leschuk | 14 | 5 | 9+2 | 4 | 1 | 0 | 0 | 0 | 2 | 1 | 0 | 0 |
Players away on loan:
| 25 | DF | (Ukraine) UKR | Mykola Matviyenko | 3 | 0 | 0 | 0 | 1 | 0 | 0 | 0 | 2 | 0 | 0 | 0 |
| 29 | MF | (Ukraine) UKR | Andriy Totovytskyi | 1 | 0 | 0+1 | 0 | 0 | 0 | 0 | 0 | 0 | 0 | 0 | 0 |
Players who left Shakhtar Donetsk during the season:
| 7 | FW | (Ukraine) UKR | Yevhen Seleznyov | 7 | 2 | 2+1 | 1 | 0+1 | 0 | 0+2 | 1 | 0 | 0 | 0+1 | 0 |
| 12 | MF | (Brazil) BRA | Wellington Nem | 11 | 0 | 2+5 | 0 | 0 | 0 | 0+1 | 0 | 0+2 | 0 | 0+1 | 0 |
| 22 | FW | (Croatia) CRO | Eduardo | 19 | 3 | 7+3 | 2 | 1 | 0 | 2 | 0 | 0+5 | 1 | 1 | 0 |

=== Goalscorers ===
| Place | Position | Nation | Number | Name | Premier League | Ukrainian Cup | Super Cup | Champions League | Europa League | Total |
|---|---|---|---|---|---|---|---|---|---|---|
| 1 | FW | (Argentina) | 19 | Facundo Ferreyra | 13 | 0 | 0 | 0 | 3 | 16 |
| 2 | MF | (Ukraine) | 74 | Viktor Kovalenko | 7 | 0 | 0 | 0 | 3 | 10 |
| 2 | MF | (Brazil) | 28 | Taison | 5 | 1 | 0 | 0 | 4 | 10 |
| 4 | | | | Own goal | 6 | 0 | 0 | 0 | 3 | 9 |
| 5 | MF | (Brazil) | 10 | Bernard | 4 | 0 | 0 | 1 | 2 | 7 |
| 5 | MF | (Brazil) | 11 | Marlos | 3 | 2 | 0 | 0 | 2 | 7 |
| 7 | FW | (Brazil) | 9 | Dentinho | 5 | 0 | 0 | 0 | 1 | 6 |
| 8 | FW | (Argentina) | 99 | Blanco Leschuk | 4 | 0 | 0 | 0 | 1 | 5 |
| 9 | MF | (Ukraine) | 6 | Taras Stepanenko | 1 | 1 | 0 | 0 | 2 | 4 |
| 9 | MF | (Brazil) | 8 | Fred | 2 | 0 | 1 | 0 | 1 | 4 |
| 9 | DF | (Ukraine) | 18 | Ivan Ordets | 4 | 0 | 0 | 0 | 0 | 4 |
| 12 | FW | (Croatia) | 22 | Eduardo | 2 | 0 | 0 | 0 | 1 | 3 |
| 12 | FW | (Ukraine) | 41 | Andriy Boryachuk | 3 | 0 | 0 | 0 | 0 | 3 |
| 14 | DF | (Brazil) | 31 | Ismaily | 2 | 0 | 0 | 0 | 0 | 2 |
| 14 | FW | (Ukraine) | 7 | Yevhen Seleznyov | 1 | 0 | 0 | 1 | 0 | 2 |
| 14 | MF | (Ukraine) | 17 | Maksym Malyshev | 1 | 0 | 0 | 0 | 1 | 2 |
| 14 | DF | (Ukraine) | 38 | Serhiy Kryvtsov | 0 | 0 | 0 | 0 | 2 | 2 |
| 18 | DF | (Croatia) | 33 | Darijo Srna | 1 | 0 | 0 | 0 | 0 | 1 |
| 18 | DF | (Ukraine) | 2 | Bohdan Butko | 1 | 0 | 0 | 0 | 0 | 1 |
| 18 | MF | (Brazil) | 29 | Alan Patrick | 1 | 0 | 0 | 0 | 0 | 1 |
| | | | | Awarded Goals | 0 | 3 | 0 | 0 | 0 | 3 |
| TOTALS | | | | | 66 | 7 | 1 | 2 | 26 | 102 |

=== Clean sheets ===
| Place | Position | Nation | Number | Name | Premier League | Ukrainian Cup | Super Cup | Champions League | Europa League | Total |
|---|---|---|---|---|---|---|---|---|---|---|
| 1 | GK | (Ukraine) | 30 | Andriy Pyatov | 14 | 1 | 0 | 1 | 5 | 21 |
| 2 | GK | (Ukraine) | 26 | Mykyta Shevchenko | 1 | 1 | 0 | 0 | 1 | 21 |
| TOTALS | | | | | 15 | 2 | 0 | 1 | 6 | 24 |

=== Disciplinary record ===
| Number | Nation | Position | Name | Premier League | | Ukrainian Cup | | Champions League | | Europa League | | Super Cup | | Total | |
| Number | Nation | Position | Name | Yellow card | Red card | Yellow card | Red card | Yellow card | Red card | Yellow card | Red card | Yellow card | Red card | Yellow card | Red card |
| 2 | (Ukraine) | DF | Bohdan Butko | 1 | 0 | 0 | 0 | 0 | 0 | 0 | 0 | 0 | 0 | 1 | 0 |
| 5 | (Ukraine) | DF | Oleksandr Kucher | 3 | 0 | 0 | 0 | 0 | 0 | 1 | 0 | 0 | 0 | 4 | 0 |
| 6 | (Ukraine) | MF | Taras Stepanenko | 6 | 0 | 0 | 0 | 1 | 0 | 3 | 0 | 1 | 0 | 11 | 0 |
| 8 | (Brazil) | MF | Fred | 7 | 0 | 0 | 0 | 1 | 0 | 5 | 1 | 0 | 0 | 13 | 1 |
| 9 | (Brazil) | FW | Dentinho | 4 | 0 | 1 | 0 | 0 | 0 | 1 | 0 | 0 | 0 | 6 | 0 |
| 10 | (Brazil) | MF | Bernard | 7 | 0 | 0 | 0 | 0 | 0 | 0 | 0 | 0 | 0 | 7 | 0 |
| 11 | (Brazil) | MF | Marlos | 4 | 0 | 0 | 0 | 0 | 0 | 0 | 0 | 0 | 0 | 4 | 0 |
| 14 | (Ukraine) | DF | Vasyl Kobin | 2 | 0 | 0 | 0 | 0 | 0 | 0 | 0 | 0 | 0 | 2 | 0 |
| 17 | (Ukraine) | MF | Maksym Malyshev | 5 | 0 | 0 | 0 | 0 | 0 | 1 | 0 | 0 | 0 | 6 | 0 |
| 18 | (Ukraine) | DF | Ivan Ordets | 3 | 0 | 0 | 0 | 0 | 0 | 1 | 0 | 0 | 0 | 4 | 0 |
| 19 | (Argentina) | FW | Facundo Ferreyra | 7 | 0 | 1 | 0 | 0 | 0 | 0 | 0 | 0 | 0 | 8 | 0 |
| 24 | (Ukraine) | MF | Vyacheslav Tankovskyi | 1 | 0 | 0 | 0 | 0 | 0 | 1 | 0 | 0 | 0 | 2 | 0 |
| 26 | (Ukraine) | GK | Mykyta Shevchenko | 0 | 0 | 1 | 0 | 0 | 0 | 0 | 0 | 0 | 0 | 1 | 0 |
| 28 | (Brazil) | MF | Taison | 3 | 0 | 0 | 0 | 1 | 0 | 2 | 0 | 0 | 0 | 6 | 0 |
| 30 | (Ukraine) | GK | Andriy Pyatov | 2 | 0 | 1 | 0 | 0 | 0 | 0 | 0 | 0 | 0 | 3 | 0 |
| 31 | (Brazil) | DF | Ismaily | 2 | 0 | 0 | 0 | 0 | 0 | 1 | 0 | 0 | 0 | 3 | 0 |
| 33 | (Croatia) | DF | Darijo Srna | 7 | 0 | 1 | 0 | 0 | 0 | 3 | 0 | 1 | 0 | 12 | 0 |
| 38 | (Ukraine) | DF | Serhiy Kryvtsov | 1 | 0 | 0 | 0 | 0 | 0 | 1 | 0 | 1 | 0 | 3 | 0 |
| 41 | (Ukraine) | FW | Andriy Boryachuk | 1 | 0 | 0 | 0 | 0 | 0 | 1 | 0 | 0 | 0 | 2 | 0 |
| 44 | (Ukraine) | DF | Yaroslav Rakitskiy | 8 | 1 | 0 | 0 | 0 | 0 | 2 | 0 | 0 | 0 | 10 | 1 |
| 55 | (Ukraine) | GK | Oleh Kudryk | 0 | 0 | 0 | 0 | 0 | 0 | 0 | 0 | 0 | 0 | 0 | 0 |
| 59 | (Ukraine) | MF | Oleksandr Zubkov | 0 | 0 | 0 | 0 | 0 | 0 | 0 | 0 | 0 | 0 | 0 | 0 |
| 66 | (Brazil) | DF | Márcio Azevedo | 1 | 0 | 0 | 0 | 0 | 0 | 0 | 0 | 0 | 0 | 1 | 0 |
| 74 | (Ukraine) | MF | Viktor Kovalenko | 2 | 0 | 0 | 0 | 0 | 0 | 1 | 0 | 0 | 0 | 3 | 0 |
| 99 | (Argentina) | FW | Gustavo Blanco Leschuk | 0 | 0 | 0 | 0 | 0 | 0 | 1 | 0 | 0 | 0 | 1 | 0 |
Players away on loan:
Players who left Shakhtar Donetsk during the season:
| 7 | (Ukraine) | FW | Yevhen Seleznyov | 1 | 0 | 0 | 0 | 0 | 0 | 0 | 0 | 0 | 0 | 1 | 0 |
| 12 | (Brazil) | MF | Wellington Nem | 1 | 0 | 0 | 0 | 0 | 0 | 0 | 0 | 0 | 0 | 1 | 0 |
| 22 | (Croatia) | FW | Eduardo | 1 | 0 | 0 | 0 | 0 | 0 | 2 | 0 | 0 | 0 | 3 | 0 |
| | | | TOTALS | 80 | 1 | 5 | 0 | 3 | 0 | 27 | 1 | 3 | 0 | 118 | 2 |

== Notes ==
4. Shakhtar Donetsk play their home matches at Arena Lviv, Lviv instead of their regular stadium, Donbas Arena, Donetsk, due to the War in Donbas.
