= Márcio Azevedo =

Brazilian footballer (born 1986)

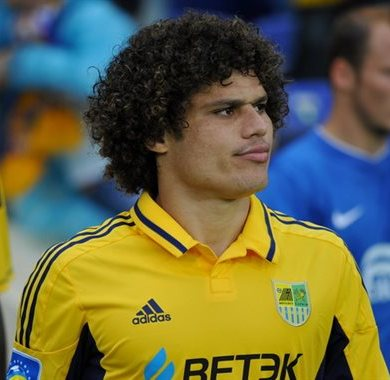

Personal information
- Full name: Márcio Gonzaga de Azevedo
- Date of birth: 5 February 1986 (age 40)
- Place of birth: Guarabira, Brazil
- Height: 1.73 m (5 ft 8 in)
- Position: Left-back

Youth career
- –2005: Juventude

Senior career*
Years	Team	Apps	(Gls)
2005–2008	Juventude	61	(1)
2007–2008	→ Fortaleza (loan)	39	(1)
2008–2010	Atlético Paranaense	81	(2)
2011–2013	Botafogo	93	(2)
2013–2014	Metalist Kharkiv	44	(0)
2014–2018	Shakhtar Donetsk	28	(0)
2018	→ PAOK (loan)	6	(0)
2018–2021	Athletico Paranaense	83	(1)
2023	ABC	13	(0)
- * Club domestic league appearances and goals as of 14 May 2023

Márcio Gonzaga de Azevedo (born 5 February 1986, known as Márcio Azevedo, is a Brazilian professional footballer who plays as a left-back.

== Career ==
=== Early career ===
Born in Guarabira, Brazil, Márcio Azevedo joined the local Juventude youth teams at a young age. Following his success in the youth ranks, he was promoted to the first team in 2004. He made his official debut on 3 December 2006, in a 5–3 loss to Corinthians. In the 2006–07 season, despite making 13 appearances (3 assists), Azevedo was not among the coach's first choices, which prompted him to consider other options.

In September 2007, he signed with Fortaleza on a loan. He was a regular starter for the side.

=== Atlético Paranaense ===
Azevedo moved to Atlético Paranaense in June 2008, and appeared 24 times (21 in the championship and 3 in the Copa Sudamericana) and scored one goal. The following season he continued to be one of the main players on the club's team, playing 29 games (3 assists). In the 2009–10 season, Azevedo was seriously injured for the first time and lost his place in the starting 11. He managed to play in 10 games (3 assists), and at the end of the season he started looking for a new club.

=== Botafogo ===
On 1 January 2011, Azevedo transferred to one of Brazil's biggest teams, Botafogo. Although he struggled with a new injury that kept him on the bench for most of the season (12 appearances, 1 assist), the club insisted on keeping him. Following this difficulty, Azevedo gained prominence in the 2011–12 season when he played in 33 games (1 goal, 4 assists), impressing the European scouts.

=== Metalist Kharkiv ===
On 27 February 2013, after two-and-a-half years with Botafogo, Azevedo signed with Ukrainian Premier League club Metalist in Kharkiv, for a transfer fee of €3 million. The move allowed him to join five of his countrymen on Metalist: Cleiton Xavier, Willian, Fininho, Jajá, and Marlos. In the second half of the 2012–13 season, he played in only 8 games, but left good impressions on the Metalist staff. In the 2013–14 season, Azevedo played in 33 games (making 1 assist).

=== Shakhtar Donetsk ===
After his exceptional appearances with the team of Kharkiv, Azevedo had gained notice and the Ukrainian giants Shakhtar Donetsk and Mircea Lucescu offered to purchase him. On 17 August 2014, he signed a four-year contract with Shakhtar Donetsk for a transfer fee of €4 million. An injury suffered on 9 March 2015 kept him out for 112 days, so that he only competed in 6 games. Despite his return to the squad, his leg injury remained an issue, and in the 2015–16 season he only played 11 games (2 assists). After a very difficult period for the defender, marred by 441 days on the injury list, Azevedo returned to action in a home game against Chornomorets Odesa in May 2017.

==== PAOK (loan) ====
In late December 2017, the administration of the Super League Greece club PAOK was close to signing Azevedo. The 31-year-old player was expected to replace Croatian international left defender Marin Leovac, in the current squad of the Greek Cup winners, ahead of the second half of the 2017–18 season. The club signed Azevedo until the end of the season and paid €400,000 for a long on him.

=== Athletico Paranaense return ===
On 24 July 2018, Athletico Paranaense announced that they had signed Azevedo until the end of 2019. On 17 December 2018, Azevedo signed a contract extension to stay at the club until the end of December 2020.

== Career statistics ==
As of 13 October 2021

Appearances and goals by club, season and competition
Club	Season	League			State League		Cup		Continental		Other		Total	
Club	Season	Division	Apps	Goals	Apps	Goals	Apps	Goals	Apps	Goals	Apps	Goals	Apps	Goals
Juventude	2005	Série A	0	0	1	0	0	0	—		—		1	0
Juventude	2006	Série A	17	0	5	0	—		—		—		22	0
Juventude	2007	Série A	20	0	18	0	4	1	—		—		42	1
Juventude	Total		37	0	24	0	4	1	0	0	0	0	65	1
Fortaleza	2007	Série B	10	0	—		—		—		—		10	0
Fortaleza	2008	Série B	4	0	23	1	4	0	—		—		31	1
Fortaleza	Total		14	0	23	1	4	0	0	0	0	0	41	1
Atlético Paranaense	2008	Série A	21	1	—		—		3 (Note: Appearance(s) in Copa Sudamericana)	0	—		24	1
Atlético Paranaense	2009	Série A	28	0	6	0	4	0	1	0	—		39	0
Atlético Paranaense	2010	Série A	10	0	16	1	6	1	0	0	—		32	2
Atlético Paranaense	Total		59	1	22	1	10	1	4	0	0	0	95	3
Botafogo	2011	Série A	9	0	10	1	5	0	3	0	—		27	1
Botafogo	2012	Série A	33	1	19	0	6	0	1	0	—		59	1
Botafogo	Total		42	1	29	1	11	0	4	0	0	0	86	2
Metalist Kharkiv	2012–13	Ukrainian Premier League	8	0	—		0	0	0	0	—		8	0
Metalist Kharkiv	2013–14	Ukrainian Premier League	28	0	—		3	0	2 (Note: Appearance(s) in UEFA Champions League)	0	—		33	0
Metalist Kharkiv	2014–15	Ukrainian Premier League	3	0	—		0	0	0	0	—		3	0
Metalist Kharkiv	Total		39	0	0	0	3	0	2	0	0	0	44	0
Shakhtar Donetsk	2014–15	Ukrainian Premier League	2	0	—		2	0	2	0	0	0	6	0
Shakhtar Donetsk	2015–16	Ukrainian Premier League	6	0	—		0	0	5	0	0	0	11	0
Shakhtar Donetsk	2016–17	Ukrainian Premier League	3	0	—		1	0	1 (Note: Appearance(s) in UEFA Europa League)	0	0	0	5	0
Shakhtar Donetsk	2017–18	Ukrainian Premier League	5	0	—		0	0	1	0	0	0	6	0
Shakhtar Donetsk	Total		16	0	0	0	3	0	9	0	0	0	28	0
PAOK	2017–18	Super League Greece	4	0	—		3	0	—		—		7	0
Athletico Paranaense	2018	Série A	11	0	—		—		0	0	—		11	0
Athletico Paranaense	2019	Série A	26	1	0	0	7	0	3 (Note: Appearance(s) in Copa Libertadores)	0	1 (Note: Appearance(s) in J.League Cup / Copa Sudamericana Championship)	0	37	1
Athletico Paranaense	2020	Série A	6	0	4	0	1	0	4	0	1 (Note: Appearance(s) in Supercopa do Brasil)	0	16	0
Athletico Paranaense	2021	Série A	4	0	7	0	1	0	1	0	—		13	0
Athletico Paranaense	Total		47	1	11	0	9	0	8	0	2	0	77	1
Career total			258	3	109	3	47	2	27	0	2	0	443	8

== Honours ==
Fortaleza

- Campeonato Cearense: 2008

Athletico Paranaense

- Campeonato Paranaense: 2009, 2020
- Copa Sudamericana: 2018, 2021
- J.League Cup / Copa Sudamericana Championship: 2019
- Copa do Brasil: 2019

Shakhtar Donetsk

- Ukrainian Premier League: 2016–17
- Ukrainian Cup: 2016, 2017
- Ukrainian Super Cup: 2016, 2017

PAOK

- Greek Cup: 2017–18
