= Wellington Nem =

Brazilian footballer (born 1992)

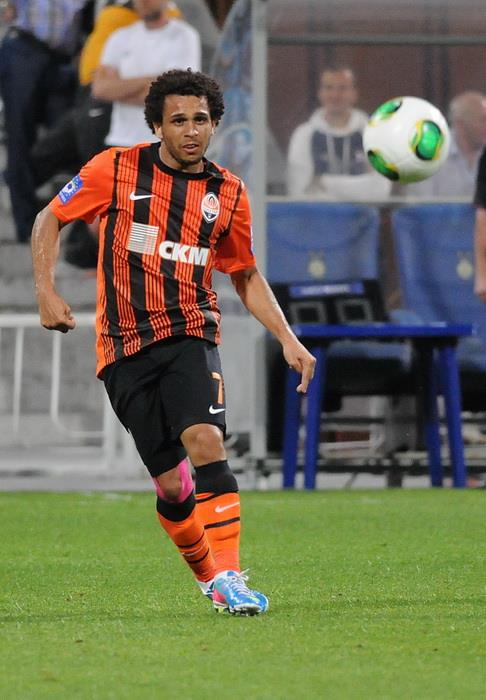
- Wellington Nem playing for Shakhtar in 2013

Personal information
- Full name: Wellington Silva Sanches Aguiar
- Date of birth: 6 February 1992 (age 34)
- Place of birth: Rio de Janeiro, Brazil
- Height: 1.65 m (5 ft 5 in)
- Positions: Winger; attacking midfielder

Team information
- Current team: Figueirense

Youth career
- 2002–2005: America-RJ
- 2005–2011: Fluminense

Senior career*
Years	Team	Apps	(Gls)
2011–2013	Fluminense	51	(15)
2011	→ Figueirense (loan)	28	(9)
2013–2020	Shakhtar Donetsk	47	(9)
2017	→ São Paulo (loan)	18	(1)
2019	→ Fluminense (loan)	18	(1)
2021	Fortaleza	2	(0)
2021–2022	Cruzeiro	23	(0)
2022	Arouca	1	(0)
2022–2023	Vitória	25	(2)
2024	Kisvárda	4	(0)
2024–2025	Becamex Binh Duong	7	(1)
2025–	Figueirense	9	(0)

International career^{‡}
2009	Brazil U17	3	(1)
2012	Brazil	3	(0)
- * Club domestic league appearances and goals as of 14 September 2024 ‡ National team caps and goals as of 30 May 2019

Wellington Silva Sanches Aguiar (born 6 February 1992), known as Wellington Nem, is a Brazilian professional footballer who plays as a winger or attacking midfielder for Figueirense.

== Club career ==
Born in Rio de Janeiro, Brazil, Nem began his professional career at Fluminense before being loaned out to Figueirense in 2011. His time at Figueirense was very successful with Nem scoring nine goals from a second striker position and being awarded the best newcomer of the 2011 Brazilian league, beating Bruno Cortes and Leandro Damião. Upon the expiration of his loan he was returned to the first team at Fluminense.

In his first season at Fluminense, Nem played mostly as a left winger or second striker and managed six goals and eight assists in 34 appearances in an impressive first full season at the club. In the 2013 season, Nem scored two and assisted two more in the first part of the season.

At just 21 years of age, Wellington Nem signed a five-year deal with Ukrainian giants Shaktar Dontesk. His first season at Shakhtar was a huge disappointment with Nem spending most of the campaign on the sideline either injured or benched, playing just 140 minutes of football throughout the 2013–14 season and scoring a solitary goal. The next season started similarly, with Nem left off the sides Champions League list and playing just once in the first 13 rounds of the Premier Liga.

Following 2017, Nem was loaned out again to the Brazilian league, this time for Brazilian side São Paulo FC. Over the next two seasons Nem would return to Shakhtar Donetsk following his loan spell, only to be reloaned again by boyhood club Fluminense. He would go on to make 18 more appearances for the club scoring a solitary goal before an end of his loan spell saw him return to Donetsk once again. Eventually he was released for free by the club, spending the next several years in various Brazilian clubs as well as Portuguese side Arouca.

=== Kisvárda FC ===
On 31 January 2024, Nem was signed by Nemzeti Bajnokság I club Kisvárda FC.

=== Bình Dương FC ===
On 6 September 2024, Nem joined V.League 1 club Becamex Binh Duong.

== International career ==
Wellington Nem's professional career took off when Mano Menezes selected him in the pre-list for the 2012 Summer Olympics.

== Career statistics ==
=== Club ===
As of 17 May 2021

Appearances and goals by club, season and competition
Club	Season	League			State League		Cup		Continental		Other		Total	
Club	Season	Division	Apps	Goals	Apps	Goals	Apps	Goals	Apps	Goals	Apps	Goals	Apps	Goals
Figueirense	2011	Série A	25	9	3	0	0	0	—		—		28	9
Fluminense	2012	Série A	27	6	14	3	—		7 (Note: Appearance(s) in Copa Libertadores)	0	—		48	9
Fluminense	2013	Série A	1	1	9	5	—		9	1	—		19	7
Fluminense	Total		28	7	23	8	—		16	1	—		67	16
Shakhtar Donetsk	2013–14	Ukrainian Premier League	5	1	—		0	0	—		—		5	1
Shakhtar Donetsk	2014–15	Ukrainian Premier League	8	3	—		5	1	2 (Note: Appearance(s) in UEFA Champions League)	0	—		15	4
Shakhtar Donetsk	2015–16	Ukrainian Premier League	9	2	—		6	2	5 (Note: Appearance(s) in UEFA Europa League)	0	—		20	4
Shakhtar Donetsk	2016–17	Ukrainian Premier League	7	0	—		0	0	3 (Note: One appearance in UEFA Champions League, Two appearances in UEFA Europa League)	0	1 (Note: Appearance(s) in Ukrainian Super Cup)	0	11	0
Shakhtar Donetsk	2017–18	Ukrainian Premier League	3	0	—		0	0	—		—		3	0
Shakhtar Donetsk	2018–19	Ukrainian Premier League	15	3	—		4	0	2	0	—		21	3
Shakhtar Donetsk	2019–20	Ukrainian Premier League	0	0	—		0	0	0	0	0	0	0	0
Shakhtar Donetsk	Total		47	9	—		15	3	12	0	1	0	75	12
São Paulo (loan)	2017	Série A	10	1	8	0	4	0	1 (Note: Appearance(s) in Copa Sudamericana)	0	—		23	1
Fluminense (loan)	2019	Série A	18	1	—		—		2	0	—		20	1
Fortaleza	2021	Série A	0	0	2	0	0	0	—		0	0	2	0
Cruzeiro	2021	Série B	0	0	—		—		—		—		0	0
Career total			128	27	38	8	19	3	31	1	1	0	215	39

=== International ===
As of match played 20 September 2013

Appearances and goals by national team and year
National team	Year	Apps	Goals
Brazil	2012	3	0
Total		3	0

== Títulos ==
Fluminense

- Taça Guanabara: 2012
- Campeonato Brasileiro Série A: 2012
- Campeonato Carioca: 2012

Shakhtar Donetsk

- Ukrainian League: 2013–14, 2017–18, 2018–19
- Ukrainian Cup: 2015–16, 2017–18, 2018–19
- Ukrainian Super Cup: 2014, 2015

Fortaleza

- Campeonato Cearense:2021

Vitória

- Campeonato Brasileiro Série B: 2023

== Prêmios individual ==
- Campeonato Brasileiro Série A Best Newcomer: 2011
