= Anton Kanibolotskyi =

Ukrainian footballer

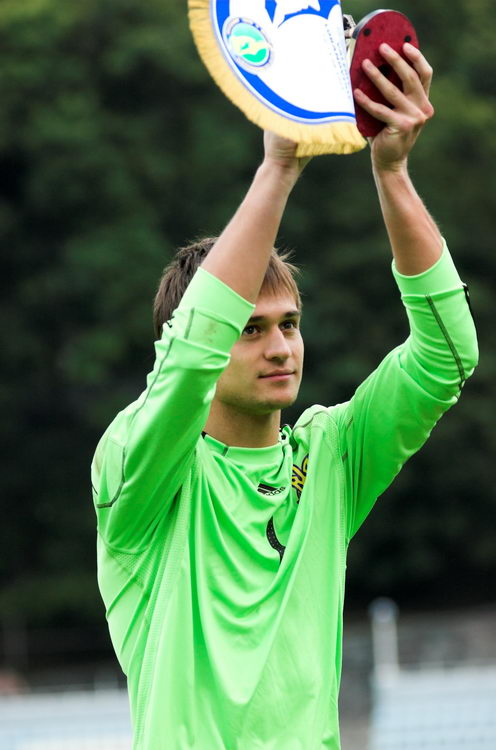
- Kanibolotskyi with Ukraine U21 in 2009

Personal information
- Full name: Anton Olehovych Kanibolotskyi
- Date of birth: 16 May 1988 (age 38)
- Place of birth: Kyiv, Ukrainian SSR, Soviet Union
- Height: 1.91 m (6 ft 3 in)
- Position: Goalkeeper

Youth career
- 2001: Lokomotyv-MSM-OMIKS Kyiv
- 2003–2004: Vidradnyi Kyiv
- 2004–2005: Lokomotyv-MSM-OMIKS Kyiv

Senior career*
Years	Team	Apps	(Gls)
2005–2012	Dnipro Dnipropetrovsk	16	(0)
2010	→ Kryvbas Kryvyi Rih (loan)	13	(0)
2012–2017	Shakhtar Donetsk	43	(0)
2017–2018	Qarabağ	6	(0)
2018–2019	Miedź Legnica	20	(0)
2020	Karpaty Lviv	1	(0)
2020–2021	Mynai	7	(0)
Total		106	(0)

International career
2008–2011	Ukraine U21	22	(0)
- * Club domestic league appearances and goals

Anton Olehovych Kanibolotskyi (Ukrainian: Антон Олегович Каніболоцький; born 16 May 1988) is a Ukrainian former professional footballer who played as a goalkeeper.

== Career ==
Kanibolotskyi started out in Dnipro Dnipropetrovsk in 2005, playing in the reserve squad, before being promoted to the first team to make his league debut in a 1–0 defeat to Tavriya Simferopol on 23 November 2008. He spent time on loan at Kryvbas in 2010. He earned his first call-up to the Ukraine senior team for a 2 June 2010 friendly match against Norway, though he did not play. He was also a member of the Ukraine national under-21 football team. He made a total of 20 appearances across all competitions for Dnipro.

On 24 July 2012, he agreed a deal to join Shakhtar Donetsk in January 2013 on a free transfer. On 30 July 2012, it was announced that he would instead join Shakhtar immediately on a five-year contract.

On 28 June 2018, Qarabağ announced that they had terminated Kanibolotskyi's contract by mutual consent.

On 17 July 2018, he signed a two-year contract with Polish club Miedź Legnica.

== Honours ==
Shakhtar Donetsk:

- Ukrainian Premier League: 2012–13, 2013–14, 2016–17
- Ukrainian Cup: 2012–13, 2015–16, 2016–17
- Ukrainian Super Cup: 2013, 2014, 2015

Qarabağ:

- Azerbaijan Premier League: 2017–18
