= Bernard (footballer) =

Brazilian footballer (born 1992)

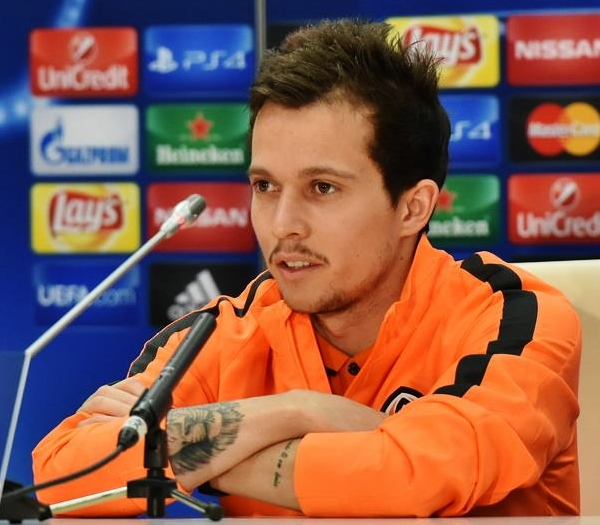
- Bernard with Shakhtar Donetsk in 2015

Personal information
- Full name: Bernard Anício Caldeira Duarte
- Date of birth: 8 September 1992 (age 34)
- Place of birth: Belo Horizonte, Brazil
- Height: 1.64 m (5 ft 5 in)
- Positions: Left winger; attacking midfielder

Team information
- Current team: Atlético Mineiro
- Number: 11

Youth career
- 1997–2006: Comercial EC do Barreiro
- 2006–2010: Atlético Mineiro

Senior career*
Years	Team	Apps	(Gls)
2010–2013	Atlético Mineiro	86	(18)
2010	→ Democrata-SL (loan)	16	(14)
2013–2018	Shakhtar Donetsk	96	(14)
2018–2021	Everton	73	(5)
2021–2022	Sharjah	23	(4)
2022–2024	Panathinaikos	62	(12)
2024–	Atlético Mineiro	85	(5)

International career
2012–2014	Brazil	14	(1)
Medal record
Men's Football
Representing Brazil
FIFA Confederations Cup
Winner	2013 Brazil
- * Club domestic league appearances and goals as of 23 September 2026

Bernard Anício Caldeira Duarte (born 8 September 1992), better known as Bernard (Brazilian Portuguese: [bɛʁˈnaʁ]), is a Brazilian professional footballer who plays for Campeonato Brasileiro Série A club Atlético Mineiro. A left-sided player, he is known for his pace and technical ability.

Born in Belo Horizonte, Bernard is of Greek ancestry through his maternal great-grandfather who emigrated from Santorini to Belo Horizonte.Bernard began his professional career with hometown club Atlético Mineiro, where he won the 2013 Copa Libertadores. He then moved for a reported €25 million fee to Shakhtar Donetsk, where he won three Ukrainian Premier League titles. In 2018, he joined Everton on a free transfer.

Bernard made his international debut for Brazil in 2012 and was in the squads that won the 2013 FIFA Confederations Cup and reached the 2014 FIFA World Cup semi-finals on home soil.

== Club career ==
=== Atlético Mineiro ===
Bernard started his footballing career in 2006, joining Atlético Mineiro's youth system, but was released twice because of his short height. In 2010, he was loaned to Democrata FC (back then, a club which was made up entirely of Atlético Mineiro's youth players), to play in Campeonato Mineiro Segunda Divisão (third level).

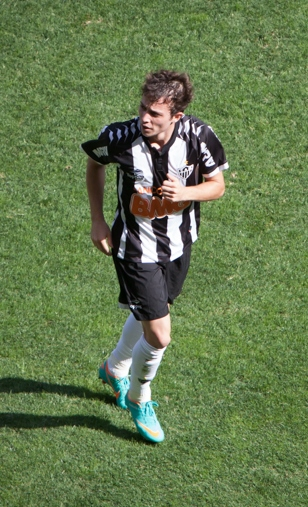
Bernard playing for Atlético Mineiro in 2012

After being the top goalscorer at Democrata (14 goals in only 16 games), Bernard returned to Atlético. Despite being young enough to play in Copa São Paulo de Juniores, he was called up by the manager Dorival Júnior to play for first team.

He made his debut with the club in the match against Uberaba, on 23 March 2011, playing in the right back position due to the squad's injury crisis at the time. He then returned to youth squads, scoring the winning goal of the Taça Belo Horizonte de Juniores.

After Dorival's dismissal and the appointment of Cuca, Bernard returned to the first team squad. On 21 May, he made his Série A debut, against Atlético Paranaense. In his first season, Bernard appeared 23 times for Galo (19 starts, 1794 minutes overall). On 14 September, Atlético's president Alexandre Kalil rejected a £3.4 million bid from Al Ahli Doha.

He scored his first professional goal on 29 January 2012, against Boa Esporte. He then scored again against Caldense on 11 February, and twice against América-MG on 13 May, Campeonato Mineiro's final. His first Série A goal came on 23 June, in a 5–1 routing against Náutico. He finished the season with 36 appearances (all starts, 3100 minutes overall), scoring eleven times, leading the club (along with Ronaldinho and Jô) to a second-place finish in the league. Bernard also won Brasileirão's Best Newcomer.

In December, Spartak Moscow had an £9.8 million offer rejected by Atlético.

On 30 July 2013, Atlético accepted a £22 million bid from Ukrainian club Shakhtar Donetsk. Bernard's agent and father, however, revealed his son was set on joining FC Porto, although Atlético's president Alexandre Kalil revealed Shakhtar were the only club to submit an offer for the player.

=== Shakhtar Donetsk ===
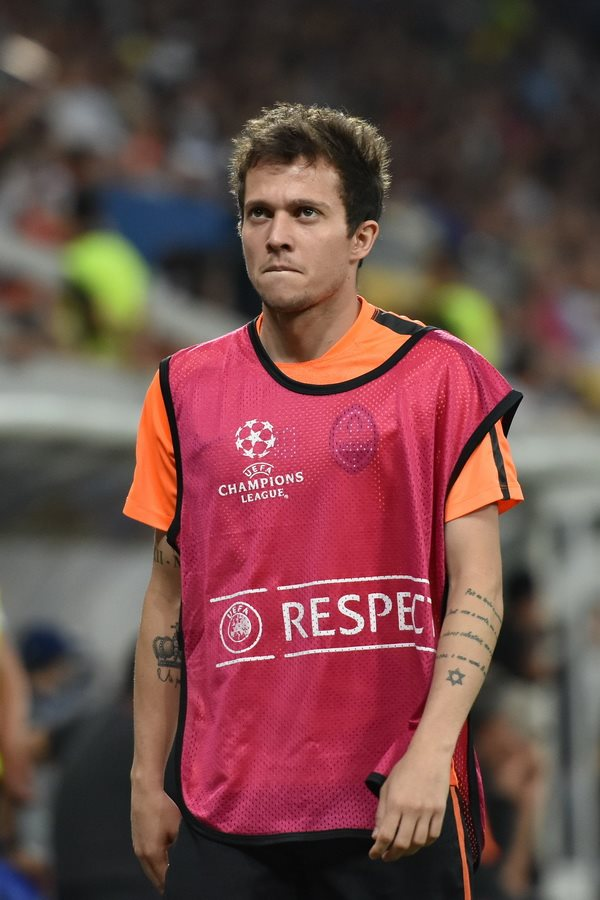
Bernard with Shakhtar Donetsk in 2015

On 8 August 2013 Shakhtar Donetsk announced the signing of Bernard on a five-year deal for a reported €25 million. He made his debut for the Ukrainian side on 31 August, coming on as a substitute for Douglas Costa, in the 1–1 draw with FC Metalist Kharkiv.

Bernard was chosen as one of the top 11 South American players 2013 by the Spanish newspaper El País.

Commenting on the 2014 Ukrainian Revolution, Bernard stated that he was willing to leave Shakhtar if the situation intensified, and had made arrangements for a potential emergency exit. His contract expired at the end of the 2017–18 season, and he became a free agent.

=== Everton ===
Bernard joined English club Everton on 9 August 2018, signing a four-year deal with the Premier League side. Manager Marco Silva ignored concerns over Bernard's height and physicality, instead signing him for his technical ability. He made his debut on 25 August in a 2–2 draw at AFC Bournemouth, replacing Theo Walcott for the final five minutes.

He scored his first goal for Everton on 5 January 2019 in a 2–1 FA Cup win over Lincoln City in the 3rd round. He then scored his first Premier League goal on 30 March 2019 in a 2–0 victory against West Ham United. On 10 February 2021, he scored the winning goal in a 5–4 win over Tottenham Hotspur after extra-time in the 2020–21 FA Cup 5th round tie.

=== Sharjah ===
On 22 July 2021, Bernard signed a two-year deal with UAE Pro League club Sharjah for a reported fee of €1 million.

=== Panathinaikos ===
On 21 August 2022, Super League Greece club Panathinaikos announced the signing of Bernard. He made his debut on 11 September in a league match against AEK Athens, coming on as a second-half substitution in a 2–1 win. He was one of their best players

=== Return to Atlético Mineiro ===
On 5 February 2024, Atlético Mineiro announced an agreement with Bernard for his return to the club upon the expiration of his contract with Panathinaikos in July 2024.

== International career ==
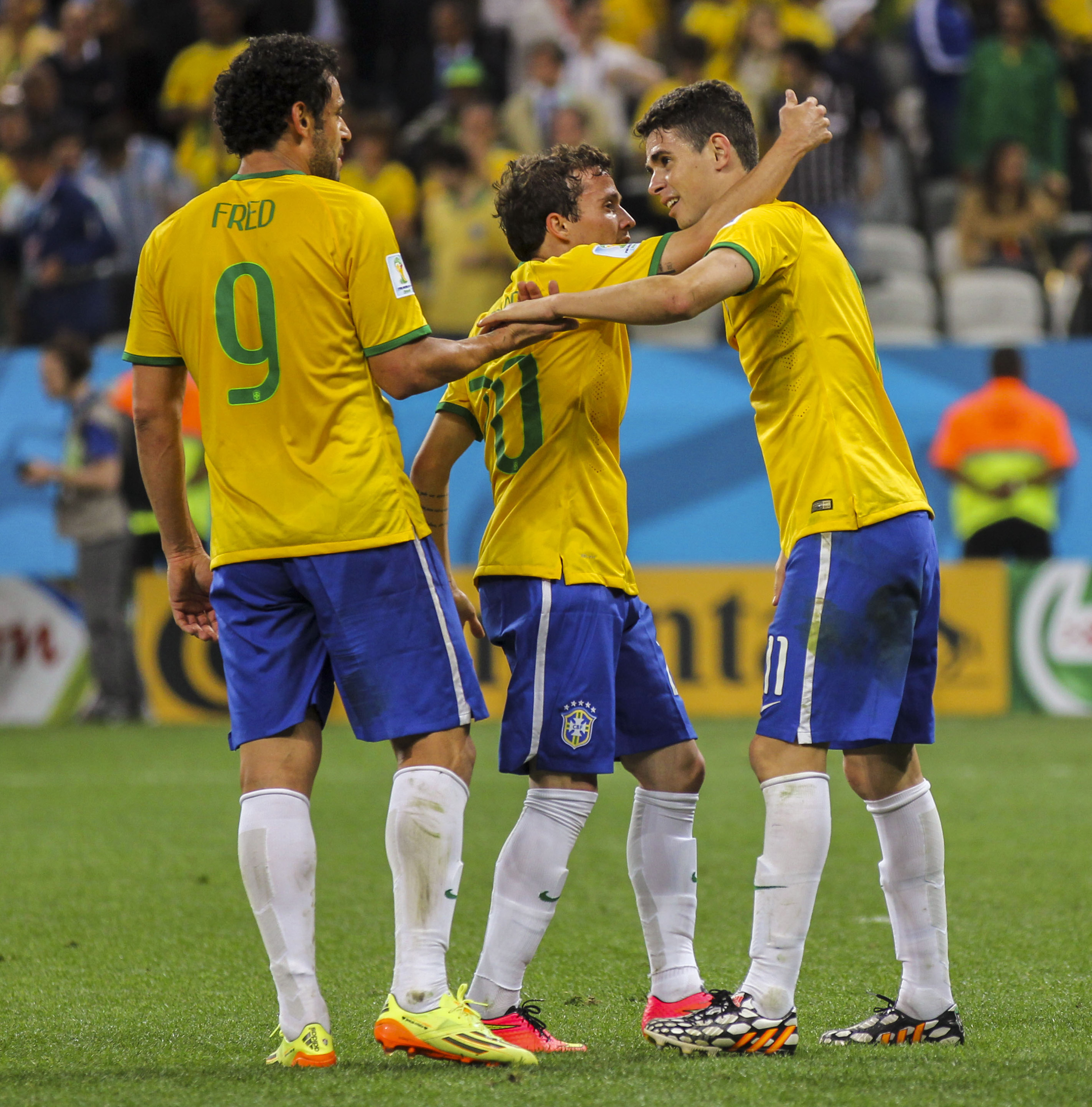
Bernard (center), playing for Brazil at the 2014 FIFA World Cup

Bernard was first called up for Brazil on 11 September 2012, to the Superclásico de las Américas, by coach Mano Menezes. He made his debut for Brazil as a 74th-minute substitute for Lucas Marques on 21 November 2012, in the 2nd leg of the 2012 Superclásico de las Américas against Argentina, where the Seleção won the title on penalties.

He was selected in Brazil's squad for their hosting of the 2013 FIFA Confederations Cup, making his first appearance in the final group game against Italy for the last 20 minutes in place of Neymar. He also came on as a substitute in the semi-final victory over Uruguay, as Brazil went on to win the trophy.

After being regularly called up by manager Luiz Felipe Scolari, Bernard was named among the final 23-man squad ahead of 2014 FIFA World Cup on 7 May 2014. He played in the opening game against Croatia as a substitute for Hulk, and came on at half-time in Brazil's second group game against Mexico, a 0–0 draw. He was then unused until his first start in a major tournament, playing all 90 minutes of the 7–1 defeat to Germany in his hometown of Belo Horizonte.

He remained an unused substitute in the third place play-off match against Netherlands, which Brazil lost 3–0.

== Career statistics ==
=== Club ===
As of match played 7 December 2025

Appearances and goals by club, season and competition
Club	Season	League			State league (Note: Includes Campeonato Mineiro)		National cup (Note: Includes Copa do Brasil, Ukrainian Cup, FA Cup, UAE President's Cup, Greek Cup)		League cup (Note: Includes EFL Cup, UAE League Cup)		Continental		Other		Total	
Club	Season	Division	Apps	Goals	Apps	Goals	Apps	Goals	Apps	Goals	Apps	Goals	Apps	Goals	Apps	Goals
Democrata-SL	2010	—			16	14	—		—		—		—		16	14
Atlético Mineiro	2011	Série A	23	0	4	0	1	0	—		0	0	—		28	0
Atlético Mineiro	2012	Série A	36	11	9	4	2	0	—		—		—		47	15
Atlético Mineiro	2013	Série A	3	1	11	2	0	0	—		11 (Note: Appearances in Copa Libertadores)	4	—		25	7
Atlético Mineiro	Total		62	12	24	6	3	0	—		11	4	—		100	22
Shakhtar Donetsk	2013–14	Ukrainian Premier League	18	2	—		3	1	—		8 (Note: Six appearances in UEFA Champions League, two appearances in UEFA Europa League)	0	0	0	29	3
Shakhtar Donetsk	2014–15	Ukrainian Premier League	14	0	—		4	2	—		5 (Note: Appearances in UEFA Champions League)	0	0	0	23	2
Shakhtar Donetsk	2015–16	Ukrainian Premier League	21	2	—		4	3	—		13 (Note: Eight appearances in UEFA Champions League, five appearances in UEFA Europa League)	0	1 (Note: Appearance in Ukrainian Super Cup)	1	39	6
Shakhtar Donetsk	2016–17	Ukrainian Premier League	24	4	—		3	0	—		9 (Note: One appearance and one goal in UEFA Champions League, eight appearances and two goals in UEFA Europa League)	3	1	0	37	7
Shakhtar Donetsk	2017–18	Ukrainian Premier League	19	6	—		1	1	—		8	3	1	0	29	10
Shakhtar Donetsk	Total		96	14	—		15	7	—		43	6	3	1	157	28
Everton	2018–19	Premier League	34	1	—		1	1	1	0	—		—		36	2
Everton	2019–20	Premier League	27	3	—		1	0	2	0	—		—		30	3
Everton	2020–21	Premier League	12	1	—		3	1	3	1	—		—		18	3
Everton	Total		73	5	—		5	2	6	1	—		—		84	8
Sharjah	2021–22	UAE Pro League	23	4	—		1	1	3	1	6 (Note: Appearances in AFC Champions League)	3	—		33	9
Panathinaikos	2022–23	Super League Greece	31	2	—		4	0	—		—		—		35	2
Panathinaikos	2023–24	Super League Greece	31	10	—		7	0	—		12 (Note: Six appearances and one goal in UEFA Champions League, six appearances in UEFA Europa League)	1	—		50	11
Panathinaikos	Total		62	12	—		11	0	—		12	1	—		85	13
Atlético Mineiro	2024	Série A	16	0	—		5	0	—		5	0	—		26	0
Atlético Mineiro	2025	Série A	30	1	9	1	3	0	—		10 (Note: Appearances in Copa Sudamericana)	3	—		52	5
Atlético Mineiro	Total		46	1	9	1	8	0	—		15	3	—		78	5
Career total			364	47	49	22	43	10	9	2	87	17	3	1	555	98

=== International ===
Appearances and goals by national team and year
National team	Year	Apps	Goals
Brazil	2012	1	0
Brazil	2013	9	1
Brazil	2014	4	0
Total		14	1

Scores and results list Brazil's goal tally first, score column indicates score after each Bernard goal.

List of international goals scored by Bernard
No.	Date	Venue	Opponent	Score	Result	Competition
1	16 November 2013	Sun Life Stadium, Miami Gardens, United States	Honduras	1–0	5–0	Friendly

== Honours ==
Atlético Mineiro

- Copa Libertadores: 2013
- Campeonato Mineiro: 2012, 2013, 2025

Shakhtar Donetsk

- Ukrainian Premier League: 2013–14, 2016–17, 2017–18
- Ukrainian Cup: 2015–16, 2016–17, 2017–18
- Ukrainian Super Cup: 2014, 2015, 2017

Panathinaikos

- Greek Cup: 2023–24

Brazil

- FIFA Confederations Cup: 2013

Individual

- Campeonato Brasileiro Série A Best Newcomer: 2012
- South American Team of the Year: 2013
