= Mykola Morozyuk =

Ukrainian footballer

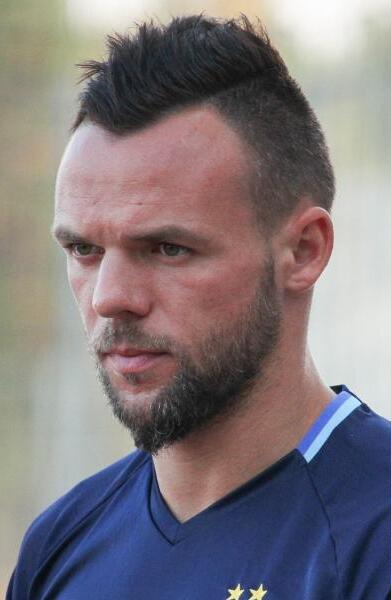
- Morozyuk in 2016

Personal information
- Full name: Mykola Mykolayovych Morozyuk
- Date of birth: 17 January 1988 (age 38)
- Place of birth: Chervonohrad, Soviet Union (now Ukraine)
- Height: 1.76 m (5 ft 9 in)
- Position: Right midfielder

Youth career
- 2001–2002: UFK Lviv
- 2003: Lokomotyv-MSM-OMIKS Kyiv
- 2003–2005: Dynamo Kyiv

Senior career*
Years	Team	Apps	(Gls)
2005–2010	Dynamo Kyiv	10	(0)
2005–2008	→ Dynamo-2 Kyiv	44	(9)
2005	→ Dynamo-3 Kyiv	5	(1)
2007	→ Dnipro Dnipropetrovsk (loan)	0	(0)
2009	→ Obolon Kyiv (loan)	14	(0)
2010	→ Kryvbas Kryvyi Rih (loan)	11	(1)
2010–2015	Metalurh Donetsk	126	(9)
2015–2019	Dynamo Kyiv	66	(6)
2019	→ Çaykur Rizespor (loan)	14	(0)
2019–2021	Çaykur Rizespor	58	(0)
2022	Chornomorets Odesa	0	(0)
2022–2023	Krasava Eny Ypsonas	14	(0)

International career^{‡}
2005–2007	Ukraine U19	28	(2)
2007–2010	Ukraine U21	19	(3)
2010–2017	Ukraine	13	(1)
- * Club domestic league appearances and goals as of 17 April 2023 ‡ National team caps and goals as of 17 April 2023

Mykola Mykolayovych Morozyuk (Ukrainian: Микола Миколайович Морозюк, born 17 January 1988) is a Ukrainian former professional footballer who played as a right midfielder.

In January 2019, Morozyuk joined Dynamo Kyiv on loan until the end of the season.

== International goals ==
Scores and results list Ukraine's goal tally first.

No	Date	Venue	Opponent	Score	Result	Competition
1.	6 February 2013	Estadio de La Cartuja, Seville, Spain	Norway	1–0	2–0	Friendly

== Honours ==
=== Club ===
Dynamo Kyiv

- Ukrainian Premier League: 2015–16
- Ukrainian Super Cup: 2016
