= Marlos =

Brazilian-born Ukrainian footballer

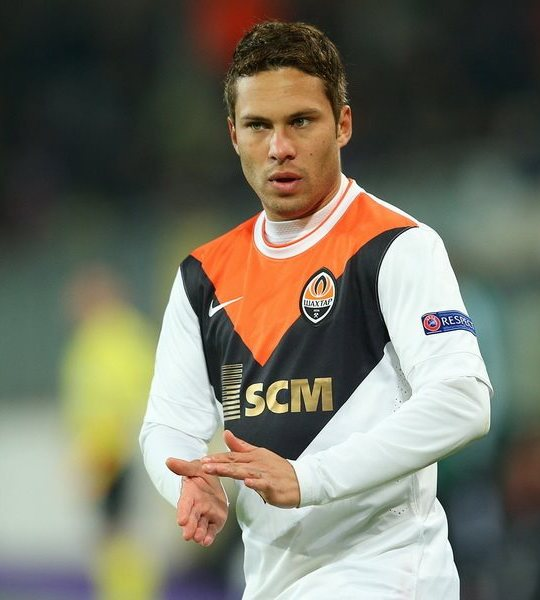
- Marlos with Shakhtar Donetsk in 2016

Personal information
- Full name: Marlos Romero Bonfim
- Date of birth: 7 June 1988 (age 38)
- Place of birth: São José dos Pinhais, Brazil
- Height: 1.74 m (5 ft 9 in)
- Position: Midfielder

Youth career
- –2005: Coritiba

Senior career*
Years	Team	Apps	(Gls)
2006–2009	Coritiba	34	(3)
2009–2011	São Paulo	59	(5)
2011	Rentistas	0	(0)
2011	→ São Paulo (loan)	26	(4)
2012–2014	Metalist Kharkiv	53	(9)
2014–2021	Shakhtar Donetsk	179	(59)
2022	Athletico Paranaense	6	(0)
Total		357	(80)

International career
2017–2021	Ukraine	27	(1)
- * Club domestic league appearances and goals

Marlos Romero Bonfim (Ukrainian: Марлос Ромеро Бонфім; born 7 June 1988), or simply Marlos, is a former professional footballer who played as a midfielder. Born in Brazil, he played for the Ukraine national team.

== Club career ==
Marlos was born in São José dos Pinhais. In July 2014, he signed a five-year contract with Shakhtar Donetsk.

In 2016–17, Marlos was recognized as a player of the month of the Ukrainian Premier League on three occasions (November 2016, May 2017, and July 2017) becoming the most-titled by the award.

On 20 October 2017, there surfaced information that Marlos was paid one million dollars, which was said to be a bonus for extending his contract (four years). Supposedly, this was done to solve the problem regarding the limit of foreign players allowed on the Shakhtar squad. The same day, Shakhtar Donetsk issued its official press release denying the pay out.

In the 2017–18 Ukrainian Premier League, he scored 18 league goals only to yield the top scorer of the season title to his teammate Facundo Ferreyra with 21 tallies.

On 31 December 2021, Marlos left Shakhtar Donetsk following the expiration of his contract.

On 1 February 2022, Marlos signed for Athletico Paranaense.

== International career ==
Marlos with Ukraine in October 2017.

On 30 September 2017, FFU announced that Marlos was called up to play for Ukraine in the upcoming games of the World Cup qualification against Kosovo and Croatia. Marlos made his debut for Ukraine on 6 October 2017, replacing Artem Kravets in the second half of a 2–0 away win against Kosovo in Shkodër (Albania) as part of the 2018 FIFA World Cup qualification. He is the second Brazilian-born to play for Ukraine after Edmar Halovskyi who represented Ukraine in 2011–2014.

== Managerial career ==
In October 2024, Marlos became general director of the Brazilian club Independente Futebol São Joseense.

== Career statistics ==
=== Club ===
Appearances and goals by club, season and competition
Club	Season	League			National cup (Note: Includes Copa do Brasil, Ukrainian Cup)		Continental		Other		Total	
Club	Season	Division	Apps	Goals	Apps	Goals	Apps	Goals	Apps	Goals	Apps	Goals
Coritiba	2008	Série A	33	3	0	0	0	0	0	0	33	3
Coritiba	2009	Série A	1	0	0	0	0	0	0	0	1	0
Coritiba	Total		34	3	0	0	0	0	0	0	34	3
São Paulo	2009	Série A	26	1	0	0	1	0	0	0	27	1
São Paulo	2010	Série A	33	4	0	0	8	0	13	1	54	5
São Paulo	2011	Série A	26	4	7	0	3	0	18	3	54	7
São Paulo	Total		85	9	7	0	12	0	31	4	135	13
Metalist Kharkiv	2011–12	Ukrainian Premier League	9	1	0	0	6	1	0	0	15	2
Metalist Kharkiv	2012–13	Ukrainian Premier League	27	5	2	2	10	1	0	0	39	8
Metalist Kharkiv	2013–14	Ukrainian Premier League	17	3	2	0	2	0	0	0	21	3
Metalist Kharkiv	Total		53	9	4	2	18	2	0	0	75	13
Shakhtar Donetsk	2014–15	Ukrainian Premier League	21	4	7	0	6	0	1	1	35	5
Shakhtar Donetsk	2015–16	Ukrainian Premier League	24	8	5	0	18	4	1	0	48	12
Shakhtar Donetsk	2016–17	Ukrainian Premier League	29	3	3	2	11	2	1	0	44	7
Shakhtar Donetsk	2017–18	Ukrainian Premier League	29	18	3	2	8	2	1	0	41	22
Shakhtar Donetsk	2018–19	Ukrainian Premier League	19	9	1	0	5	1	1	0	26	10
Shakhtar Donetsk	2019–20	Ukrainian Premier League	24	13	1	0	10	0	1	0	36	13
Shakhtar Donetsk	2020–21	Ukrainian Premier League	19	2	1	0	10	0	1	0	31	2
Shakhtar Donetsk	2021–22	Ukrainian Premier League	14	2	1	0	10	1	1	0	26	3
Shakhtar Donetsk	Total		179	59	22	4	78	10	8	1	287	74
Athletico Paranaense	2022	Série A	6	0	2	2	6	1	0	0	14	3
Career total			357	80	35	8	114	13	39	5	545	106

=== International ===
Appearances and goals by national team and year
National team	Year	Apps	Goals
Ukraine	2017	3	0
Ukraine	2018	8	0
Ukraine	2019	5	1
Ukraine	2020	4	0
Ukraine	2021	7	0
Total		27	1

Scores and results list Ukraine's goal tally first, score column indicates score after each Marlos goal.

List of international goals scored by Marlos
No.	Date	Venue	Opponent	Score	Result	Competition
1	7 September 2019	LFF Stadium, Vilnius, Lithuania	Lithuania	2–0	3–0	UEFA Euro 2020 qualification

== Honours ==
Coritiba

- Brazilian Série B: 2007
- Paraná State League: 2008

Shakhtar Donetsk

- Ukrainian Premier League: 2016–17, 2017–18, 2018–19, 2019–20
- Ukrainian Cup: 2015–16, 2016–17, 2017–18, 2018–19
- Ukrainian Super Cup: 2014, 2015, 2017, 2021

Individual

- UEFA Europa League Squad of the Season: 2015–16
- Ukrainian Premier League Footballer of the Year: 2016, 2017, 2018
- Ukrainian Premier League Best Player of Season: 2017–18
- Football Stars of Ukraine – Best UPL player: 2017, 2018
- Ukrainian Premier League Player of the Month: 2016–17 (November), 2016–17 (May), 2017–18 (July)
