= Anatoliy Abdula =

Ukrainian football referee (born 1976)

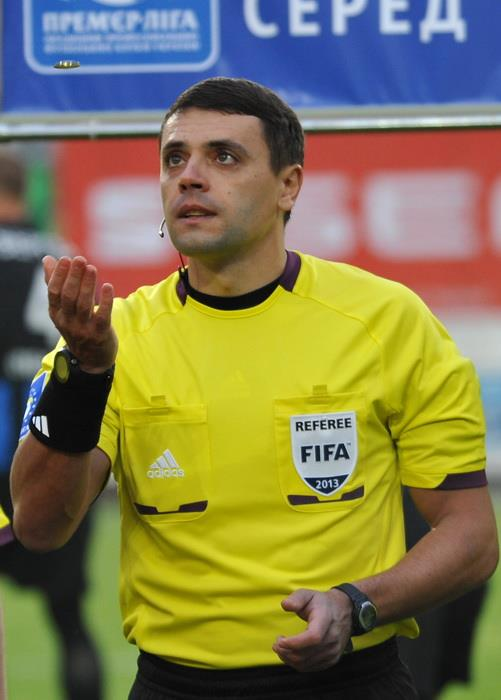
- Full name: Anatoliy Borysovych Abdula
- Born: 12 November 1976 (age 49); Kharkiv, Ukraine SSR

Domestic
Years	League	Role
2008-	Ukrainian Premier League	Referee

International
Years	League	Role
2012–	FIFA listed	Referee

Anatoliy Borysovych Abdula (Ukrainian: Анатолій Борисович Абдула, born 12 November 1976) is a Ukrainian professional football referee. He has been a full international for FIFA since 2012.

== Honours ==
- Ukrainian Premier League best arbiter (3): 2011–12, 2015–16, 2016–17
