= Ukrainian Super Cup =

Super Cup of Ukraine
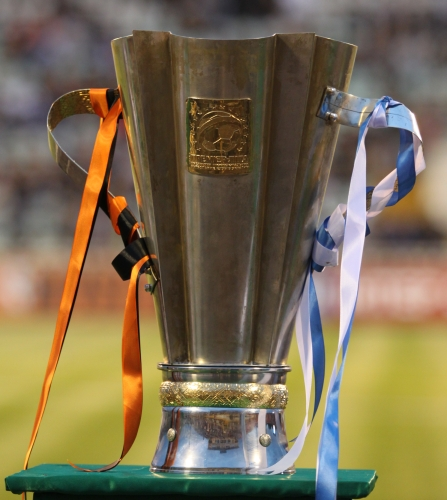
- Founded: 2004; 22 years ago
- Abolished: 2021; 5 years ago
- Region: Ukraine
- Teams: 2
- Last champions: Shakhtar Donetsk (9th title)
- Most championships: Dynamo Kyiv; Shakhtar Donetsk (9 titles each)

The Ukrainian Super Cup (Ukrainian: Суперкубок України) is an association football game of the Ukrainian Premier League in traditional super cup format that acts as the grand-opening for every new football competition season in Ukraine. Originally it was set as a contest between the winners of the previous season's Ukrainian Championship and Ukrainian Cup. From 2008 through 2014, it was branded as the Inter Super Cup of Ukraine, in 2017 – Super Cup Fokstrot.

Following the Russian invasion of Ukraine, the competition has been suspended.

== History and overview ==
The competition and its trophy was presented on 1 July 2007 in hotel "Ekspres". In the event participated president of the Professional Football League of Ukraine (PFL) Ravil Safiullin, general director of Info-sport Marketing Serhiy Kharchenko, representative of the game general sponsor "Olimp". At the press conference Mr.Safiullin informed several details about the new tournament among which was the money prize fund that consisted of 75,000 "conditional units", a lottery for fans winner of which would receive a car, the game opening show was planned to be hosted by Ukrainian singer Kateryna Buzhynska (uk). It was also informed that there will be no extra time and series of penalty kicks would follow right after the regular time.

The president of PFL refused to disclose the amount of money that was paid to create the Super Cup trophy. He noted that the trophy will be given away for eternal keeping to the team that would win it five times.

The drawing for the trophy was created by Mykhailo Cheburakhin ("Dialan-M" company), for which he received a reward of 1,000 "conditional units".

The prize money fund for the second edition in 2005 was established at ₴375,000.

In 2022, the match was cancelled for the first time in its history due to the Russian Invasion of Ukraine, and has not been held again since. The decision to end the game was motivated by the abandonment of the Ukrainian Premier League's 2021–22 season and the Ukrainian Cup's 2021–22 season. Odesa, the game's usual host city, has been continually struck by Russian cruise missiles since the beginning of the war, making it infeasible for the game to be held safely.

=== Format ===
The Ukrainian Super Cup usually features one representative of the Ukrainian Premier League and another of the Ukrainian Cup. In event when both tournaments were won by one club, participation in the game is granted to the cup finalist (until 2014) or the league runner-up (since 2015).

On some occasions when the national cup was won by a national champion, it was challenged by the league runner-up or the cup finalist.

=== Venues ===
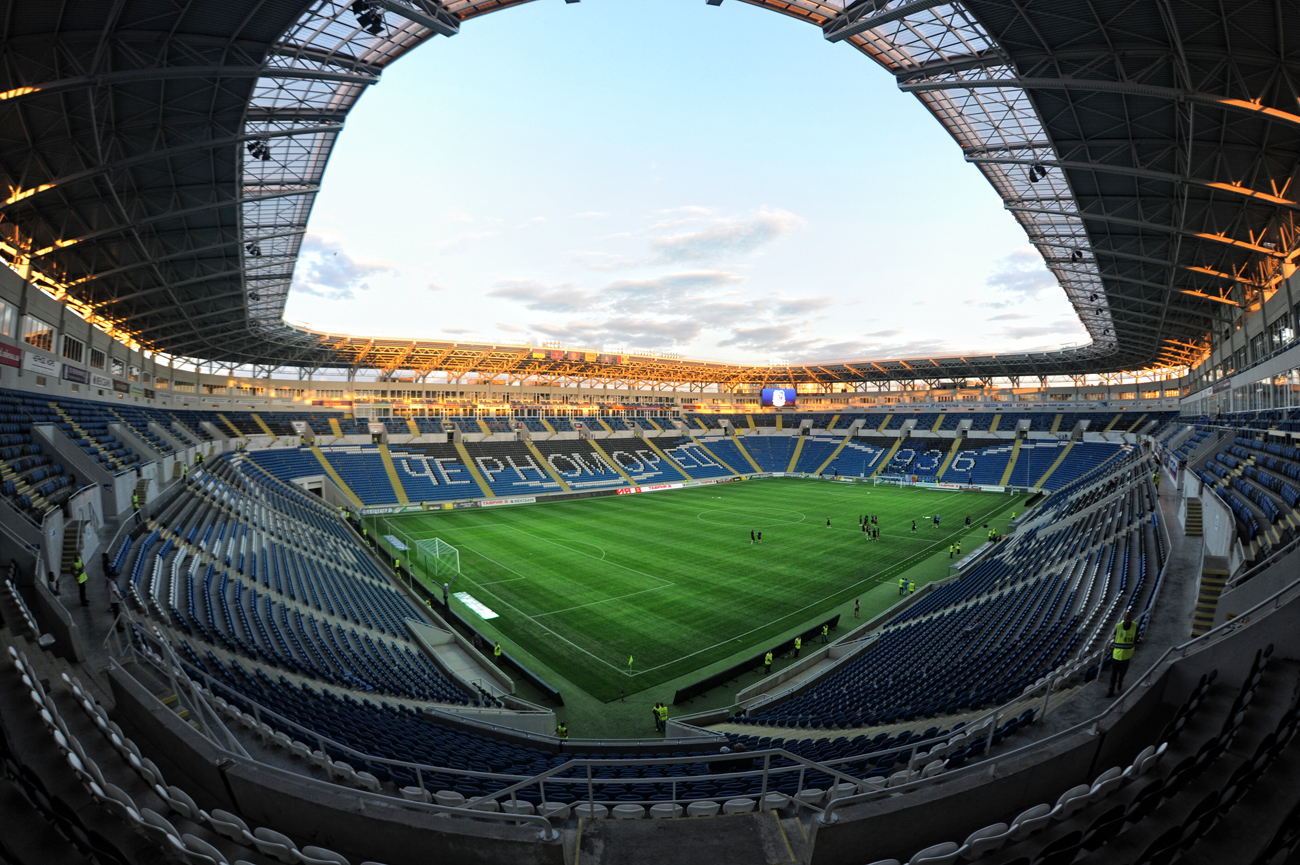
Chornomorets Stadium, main arena of the tournament

Traditionally played in Odesa at the Chornomorets Stadium, the season's opening match did not initially have a "fixed" venue. The decision to conduct the match in Odesa in 2005 was adopted by the PFL Bureau three days before the game and on petition of both Dynamo and Shakhtar. Due to the preparation for UEFA Euro 2012, however, the newly established tradition changed and for the 2008 rendition it was moved to Poltava's Oleksiy Butovsky Vorskla Stadium. In 2009, the cup venue changed once again to the Sumy's Yuvileiny Stadium which stood relatively underutilized since the main city football club went bankrupt. The 2009 edition featured Vorskla, which became the first team outside of the Ukrainian derby (Dynamo and Shakhtar) to participate. In 2007 and 2008, the Super Cup was held between the first- and second-placed teams, as one of the teams won both the Cup and the Premier League.

=== Sponsors ===
The 2008 rendition was officially known as Inter Super Cup of Ukraine and sponsored by the TV channel Inter. In 2009, the contract was extended for another three years and later again to 2014. The very first Super Cup was handed over by Prime Minister of Ukraine Viktor Yanukovych.

In 2016, the tournament received another sponsor, an American construction company UDP (Urban Development + Partners).

The prize money fund in 2014 and 2015 consisted of ₴1 million. The winner was to receive 650,000 and the other finalist 350,000.

== History ==
=== 2004 Ukrainian Super Cup ===
2004-07-10
17:00 EET

Dynamo Kyiv (as League champions)	1–1 6–5 (pen.)	Shakhtar Donetsk (as Cup winners)
Husyev 21' Penalties: (penalty missed) Diogo Rincón (penalty missed) Khatskevich (penalty scored) Shatskikh (penalty missed) Bidnenko (penalty scored) Byalkevich (penalty scored) Husyev (penalty missed) Gavrančić (penalty scored) Kaddouri (penalty scored) Dmytrulin (penalty scored) Shovkovskyi	Report (in Ukrainian)	Lewandowski 77' Penalties: (penalty missed) Vorobey (penalty missed) Tymoshchuk (penalty missed) Marica (penalty scored) Lewandowski (penalty scored) Stoican (penalty scored) Raț (penalty missed) Bakharev (penalty scored) Matuzalém (penalty scored) Batista (penalty missed) Barcauan

Odesa, Central Stadium of the BSS Co.
Attendance: 17,600
Referee: Vitaliy Hodulian (Odesa)

=== 2005 Ukrainian Super Cup ===
2005-07-09
20:45 EET

Shakhtar Donetsk (as League champions)	1–1 4–3 (pen.)	Dynamo Kyiv (as Cup winners)
Elano 5' Penalties: (penalty scored) Jádson (penalty scored) Raț (penalty scored) Tymoshchuk (penalty scored) Stoican (penalty missed) Srna	Report (in Ukrainian)	Byalkevich 32' Penalties: (penalty scored) Aliev (penalty missed) Sablić (penalty scored) Gavrančić (penalty scored) Husyev (penalty missed) Shatskikh

Odesa, Central Stadium of the BSS Co.
Attendance: 34,400
Referee: Ihor Podushkin (Kharkiv)

=== 2006 Ukrainian Super Cup ===
2006-07-16
20:30 EET

Dynamo Kyiv (as Cup winners)	2–0	Shakhtar Donetsk (as League champions)
Marković 10'; Milevskyi 87'	Report (in Ukrainian)

Odesa, Central Stadium of the BSS Co.
Attendance: 35,000
Referee: Vitaliy Hodulian (Odesa)

=== 2007 Ukrainian Super Cup ===
2007-07-10
20:45 EET

Dynamo Kyiv (as League champions)	2–2 4–2 (pen.)	Shakhtar Donetsk (as Cup runners-up)
Mykhalyk 27', 30' Penalties: (penalty missed) Aliyev (penalty scored) Ninković (penalty scored) Dedechko (penalty scored) Marković (penalty scored) Moroziuk	Report (in Ukrainian)	Hladkyy 14'; Tkachenko 55' Penalties: (penalty missed) Brandão (penalty scored) Fernandinho (penalty missed) Jádson (penalty scored) Raț

Odesa, Central Stadium of the BSS Co.
Attendance: 32,000
Referee: Pieter Vink (Holland)

=== 2008 Ukrainian Super Cup ===
2008-07-15
20:45 EET

Shakhtar Donetsk (as League champions)	1–1 5–3 (pen.)	Dynamo Kyiv (as Cup runners-up)
Chyhrynskyi 38' Penalties: (penalty scored) Srna (penalty scored) Chyhrynskyi (penalty scored) Raț (penalty scored) Fernandinho (penalty scored) Brandão	Report (in Ukrainian)	Milevskyi 6' Penalties: (penalty missed) Diakhaté (penalty scored) Ninković (penalty scored) Aliyev (penalty scored) Yarmolenko

Poltava, Oleksiy Butovsky Vorskla Stadium
Attendance: 28,000
Referee: Wolfgang Stark (Germany)

=== 2009 Ukrainian Super Cup ===
2009-07-11
20:45 EET

Dynamo Kyiv (as League champions)	0–0 4–2 (pen.)	Vorskla Poltava (as Cup winners)
Penalties: (penalty scored) Ninković (penalty scored) Kravchenko (penalty scored) Eremenko (penalty scored) Yarmolenko	Report (in Ukrainian)	Penalties: (penalty scored) Curri (penalty scored) Markoski (penalty missed) Despotovski (penalty missed) Dallku

Sumy, Yuvileiny Stadium
Attendance: 18,500
Referee: Yevhen Herenda (Kalush)

=== 2010 Ukrainian Super Cup ===
2010-07-04
20:45 EET

Shakhtar Donetsk (as League champions)	7–1	Tavriya Simferopol (as Cup winners)
Hladkyy 2', 51'; Jádson 35'; Willian 67'; Luiz Adriano 78', 85'; Raț 90'	Report (in Ukrainian)	Feschuk 32'

Zaporizhzhia, Slavutych-Arena
Attendance: 10,500
Referee: Andriy Shandor (Lviv)

=== 2011 Ukrainian Super Cup ===
2011-07-05
21:00 EET

Shakhtar Donetsk (as League champions)	1–3	Dynamo Kyiv (as Cup runners-up)
Fernandinho 14'	Report (in Ukrainian)	Husyev 5' (pen.); Diakhaté 31'; Milevskyi 83'

Poltava, Oleksiy Butovsky Vorskla Stadium
Attendance: 24,750
Referee: Yuriy Vaks (Simferopol)

=== 2012 Ukrainian Super Cup ===
2012-07-10
21:00 EET

Shakhtar Donetsk (as League champions)	2–0	Metalurh Donetsk (as Cup runners-up)
Luiz Adriano 5'; Douglas Costa 35'	Report (in Ukrainian)

Luhansk, Avanhard Stadium
Attendance: 21,050
Referee: Anatoliy Abdula (Kharkiv)

=== 2013 Ukrainian Super Cup ===
2013-07-10
21:00 EET

Chornomorets Odesa (as Cup runners-up)	1–3	Shakhtar Donetsk (as League champions)
Antonov 45+1'	Report (in Ukrainian)	Fred 17', 33'; Taison 67' (pen.)

Odesa, Chornomorets Stadium
Attendance: 32,400
Referee: Serhiy Boiko (Kyiv Oblast)

=== 2014 Ukrainian Super Cup ===
2014-07-22
21:00 EET

Shakhtar Donetsk (as League champions)	2–0	Dynamo Kyiv (as Cup winners)
Hladkyy 75'; Marlos 90+3'	Report (in Ukrainian)

Lviv, Arena Lviv
Attendance: 34,347
Referee: Yuriy Morzharovskyi (Lviv)

=== 2015 Ukrainian Super Cup ===
2015-07-14
21:00 EET

Dynamo Kyiv (as League champions)	0–2	Shakhtar Donetsk (as League runners-up)
	Report	Srna 90+2' (pen.); Bernard 90+4'

Odesa, Chornomorets Stadium
Attendance: 34,164
Referee: Anatoliy Zhabchenko (Khmelnytskyi)

=== 2016 Ukrainian Super Cup ===
2016-07-16
21:00 EET

Shakhtar Donetsk (as Cup winners)	1–1 3–4 (pen.)	Dynamo Kyiv (as League champions)
Fred 58' Penalties: Srna (penalty scored) Bernard (penalty missed) Ismaily (penalty scored) Fred (penalty scored) Seleznyov (penalty missed)	Report (in Ukrainian)	Vida 79' Penalties: Antunes (penalty scored) Morozyuk (penalty scored) Harmash (penalty missed) Khacheridi (penalty scored) Moraes (penalty scored)

Odesa, Chornomorets Stadium
Attendance: 26,109
Referee: Anatoliy Abdula (Kharkiv)

=== 2017 Ukrainian Super Cup ===
2017-07-15
21:00 EET

Shakhtar Donetsk (as League champions)	2–0	Dynamo Kyiv (as League runners-up)
Ferreyra 8', 56'	Report (in Ukrainian)

Chornomorets Stadium, Odesa
Attendance: 34,146
Referee: Anatoliy Zhabchenko (Khmelnytskyi)

=== 2018 Ukrainian Super Cup ===
2018-07-21
21:00 EEST

Shakhtar Donetsk (as League champions)	0–1	Dynamo Kyiv (as League runners-up)
	Report	Buyalskyi 18'

Chornomorets Stadium, Odesa
Attendance: 27,400
Referee: Kostiantyn Trukhanov

=== 2019 Ukrainian Super Cup ===
2019-07-28
21:00 EEST

Shakhtar Donetsk (as League champions)	1–2	Dynamo Kyiv (as League runners-up)
Patrick 45+3'	Report	Burda 80'; Harmash 83'

Chornomorets Stadium, Odesa
Attendance: 27,400
Referee: Vitaliy Romanov (Dnipro)

=== 2020 Ukrainian Super Cup ===
2020-08-25
21:00 EEST

Shakhtar Donetsk (as League champions)	1–3	Dynamo Kyiv (as Cup winners)
Moraes 37'	Report	de Pena 20'; Rodrigues 31'; Sol 83'

Olimpiyskiy National Sports Complex, Kyiv
Attendance: 0
Referee: Vitaliy Romanov (Dnipro)

=== 2021 Ukrainian Super Cup ===
2021-09-22
21:00 EEST

Shakhtar Donetsk (as League runners-up)	3–0	Dynamo Kyiv (as League champions)
Traoré 30', 54'; Patrick 61'	Report

Olimpiyskiy National Sports Complex, Kyiv
Attendance: 27,553
Referee: Andriy Kovalenko (Poltava)

Note:

All fixtures are played till the end of regulation time. If the score is tied, no extra time is played with penalty kicks immediately taken to determine the victory.

== Performance ==
=== Performance by club ===
Club	Winners	Runners-up	Winning years
Shakhtar Donetsk	9	8	2005, 2008, 2010, 2012, 2013, 2014, 2015, 2017, 2021
Dynamo Kyiv	9	6	2004, 2006, 2007, 2009, 2011, 2016, 2018, 2019, 2020
Vorskla Poltava	—	1	
Tavriya Simferopol	—	1	
Metalurh Donetsk	—	1	
Chornomorets Odesa	—	1	
Total	18	18	

=== Performance by qualification ===
Competition	Winners	Runners-up
Premier League champions	11	7
Premier League runners-up (since 2015)	4	1
Ukrainian Cup winners	2	6
Ukrainian Cup runners-up (2004–2014)	1	4
Total	18	18

== Venues ==
Number	Name	Location	Years	Winning clubs
10	Chornomorets Stadium (Central Stadium ChMP)	Odesa	2004–2007, 2013, 2015–2019	Shakhtar (4), Dynamo (6)
2	Olimpiyskiy National Sports Complex	Kyiv	2020, 2021	Dynamo, Shakhtar
2	Oleksiy Butovsky Vorskla Stadium	Poltava	2008, 2011	Shakhtar, Dynamo
1	Yuvileiny Stadium	Sumy	2009	Dynamo
1	Slavutych-Arena	Zaporizhzhia	2010	Shakhtar
1	Avanhard Stadium	Luhansk	2012	Shakhtar
1	Arena Lviv	Lviv	2014	Shakhtar

== Winning managers ==
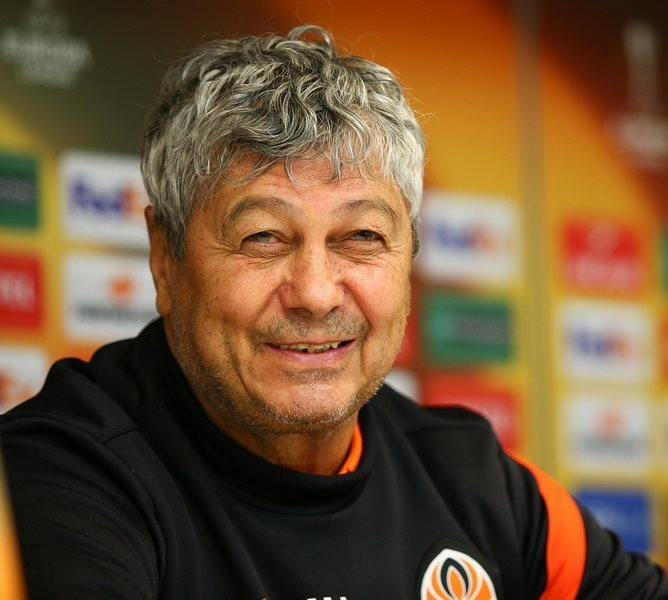
Mircea Lucescu

In bold are managers that still active in the current season. In parentheses are cups for the respective team.

Rank	Manager	Club(s)	Winner	Runner-up
1	(Romania) **Mircea Lucescu**	Shakhtar Donetsk (7); Dynamo Kyiv (1)	8	4
2	(Belarus) Alyaksandr Khatskevich	Dynamo Kyiv	2	1
3	(Ukraine) Anatoliy Demyanenko	Dynamo Kyiv	2	—
4	(Ukraine) Serhii Rebrov	Dynamo Kyiv	1	2
4	(Portugal) Paulo Fonseca	Shakhtar Donetsk	1	2
6	(Russia) Yuri Semin	Dynamo Kyiv	1	1
7	(Ukraine) Oleksiy Mykhaylychenko	Dynamo Kyiv	1	—
7	(Italy) Roberto De Zerbi	Shakhtar Donetsk	1	—
7	(Russia) Valery Gazzaev	Dynamo Kyiv	1	—

The first winning coach is Oleksiy Mykhailychenko, the first winning coach who previously won the cup as a player is Serhii Rebrov.

== Winning players ==
In bold are players that are still active in the current season

Rank	Player	Club(s)	Wins
1	(Croatia) Darijo Srna	Shakhtar Donetsk	8
2	(Ukraine) **Taras Stepanenko**	Shakhtar Donetsk	6
2	(Ukraine) Yaroslav Rakitskiy	Shakhtar Donetsk	6
4	(Ukraine) Oleksandr Shovkovskyi	Dynamo Kyiv	5
4	(Ukraine) Oleksandr Kucher	Shakhtar Donetsk	5
6	10 players		4

== All-time top scorers ==
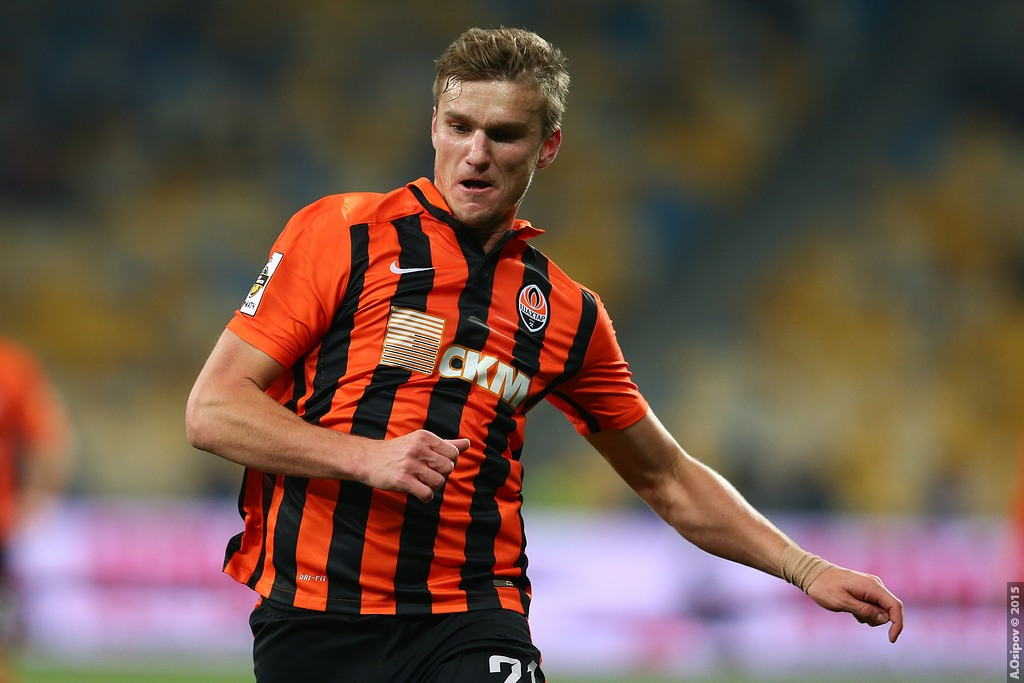
Oleksandr Hladkyy, 2015

There were 35 scorers with 49 goals.

Rank	Player	Club(s)	Goals
1	(Ukraine) Oleksandr Hladkyy	Shakhtar Donetsk	4
2	(Brazil) Luiz Adriano	Shakhtar Donetsk	3
2	(Ukraine) Artem Milevskyi	Dynamo Kyiv	3
2	(Brazil) Fred	Shakhtar Donetsk	3
5	(Ukraine) Oleh Husyev	Dynamo Kyiv	2
5	(Ukraine) Taras Mykhalyk	Dynamo Kyiv	2
5	(Argentina) Facundo Ferreyra	Shakhtar Donetsk	2
5	(Brazil) Alan Patrick	Shakhtar Donetsk	2
5	(Burkina Faso) Lassina Traoré	Shakhtar Donetsk	2
10	26 players		1

== All-time appearances ==
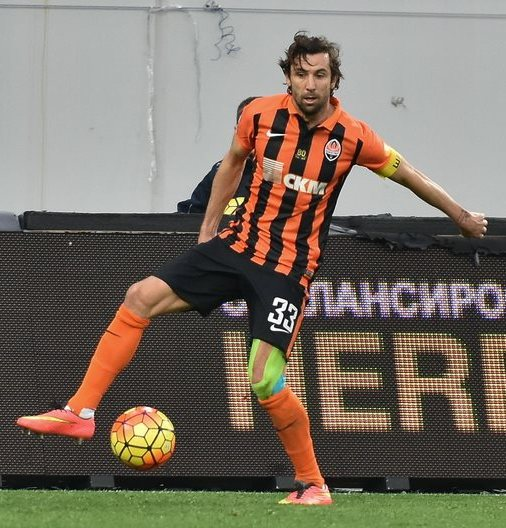
Darijo Srna, 2016

Rank	Player	Club(s)	Appearances
1	(Croatia) Darijo Srna	Shakhtar Donetsk	12
2	(Ukraine) Taras Stepanenko	Shakhtar Donetsk	10
3	(Ukraine) Oleksandr Shovkovskyi	Dynamo Kyiv	9
3	(Ukraine) Andriy Pyatov	Shakhtar Donetsk	9
5	(Ukraine) Yaroslav Rakitskiy	Shakhtar Donetsk	8

=== Performance by club ===
Club	Winners	Runners-up	Winning years
Dynamo Kyiv	8	3	1993, 1995, 1996, 1997, 1998, 1999, 2000, 2003
Shakhtar Donetsk	2	3	2001, 2002
Chornomorets Odesa	2	—	1992, 1994
Karpaty Lviv	—	2	
Tavriya Simferopol	—	1	
Nyva Vinnytsia	—	1	
CSKA Kyiv	—	1	
Kryvbas Kryvyi Rih	—	1	
Total	12	12	

== See also ==
- Soviet Super Cup
- Ukrainian Premier League
