= 2016–17 FC Karpaty Lviv season =

Karpaty Lviv
2016–17 season
- Chairman: (Ukraine) Petro Dyminskyi
- Manager: (Belarus) Oleg Dulub
- Stadium: Arena Lviv, Lviv
- Premier League: 10th
- Ukrainian Cup: Round of 16
- Top goalscorer: League: Gustavo Blanco Leschuk (7); All: Gustavo Blanco Leschuk (7)
- Highest home attendance: 10,044 vs Dynamo; 31 July 2016
- Lowest home attendance: 1,200 vs Stal; 22 October 2016

The 2016–17 FC Karpaty Lviv season was the 54th season in club history.

== Review and events ==
On 1 June 2016 FC Karpaty gathered at club's base for medical inspection after vacations.

After changing 3 managers in a month due to various reasons, Karpaty went to training camp in Poland on 6 July 2016 with 3 friendly matches planned.

== Competitions ==
=== Friendly matches ===
==== Pre-season ====
11 June 2016 Friendly match	Karpaty Lviv	2 – 1	Rukh Vynnyky	Lviv
17:00 EEST (UTC+3)	Nesterov 15'; Blanco Leschuk 19'	Report	Myts' 90'	Stadium: Ukraina Stadium; Referee: Oleksandr Shandor

18 June 2016 Friendly match	Karpaty Lviv	4 – 0	Hirnyk Sosnivka	Lviv
12:00 EEST (UTC+3)	Klyots; Blanco Leschuk; Serhiychuk 75'; Okechukwu 80'	Report		Stadium: Ukraina Stadium

25 June 2016 Friendly match	Karpaty Lviv	0 – 1	Veres Rivne	Lviv
17:00 EEST (UTC+3)		Report	Borzenko 21'	Stadium: Ukraina Stadium; Referee: Oleksandr Kalyonov

29 June 2016 Friendly match	Karpaty Lviv	0 – 1	Volyn Lutsk	Lviv
17:00 EEST (UTC+3)		Report	Didenko 24'	Stadium: Ukraina Stadium

9 July 2016 Friendly match	Ruch Chorzów (Poland)	0 – 3	Karpaty Lviv	Chorzów, Poland
16:00 CEST (UTC+2)		Report	Novotryasov 5'; Klyots 8'; Ksyonz 55' (pen.)	Stadium: side pitch of Stadion Miejski

11 July 2016 Friendly match	Górnik Zabrze (Poland)	1 – 0	Karpaty Lviv	Zabrze, Poland
16:00 CEST (UTC+2)	Wolniewicz 20'	Report		Stadium: Ernest Pohl Stadium

12 July 2016 Friendly match	MC Alger (Algeria)	0 – 1	Karpaty Lviv	Wisła, Poland
16:00 CEST (UTC+2)		Report	Verbnyi 65'

16 July 2016 Friendly match	Karviná (Czech Republic)	1 – 3	Karpaty Lviv	Karviná, Czech Republic
17:00 CEST (UTC+2)	Dreksa 43'	Report	Miroshnichenko 44'; Markovych 74'; Chachua 80'	Stadium: Stadion Kovona; Attendance: 250; Referee: Zbyněk Proske (Czech Republic)

==== Mid-season ====
11 November 2016 Kraków - Lviv Inter-city Cup	Wisła Kraków (Poland)	0 – 4	Karpaty Lviv	Kraków, Poland
12:00 CET (UTC+1)		Report	Kujawa 4' (o.g.); Ksyonz 23', 71'; Chachua 59'	Stadium: Stadion Miejski im. Henryka Reymana; Referee: Sebastian Krasny (Poland)

==== Winter break ====
18 January 2017 Friendly match	Nasaf Qarshi (Uzbekistan)	3 – 1	Karpaty Lviv	Antalya, Turkey
16:00 EET (UTC+2)	Ćeran 5', 50'; Khushbakov 90'	Report	China 65'	Stadium: WOW Sport Center

21 January 2017 Friendly match	Dunajská Streda (Slovakia)	1 – 1	Karpaty Lviv	Antalya, Turkey
16:00 EET (UTC+2)	Vida 10'	Report	Ksyonz 20' (pen.)	Stadium: WOW Sport Center

24 January 2017 Friendly match	Olmaliq (Uzbekistan)	1 – 3	Karpaty Lviv	Antalya, Turkey
10:00 EET (UTC+2)	Dulović 62'	Report	Conti 33'; Kasmynin 63' (o.g.); Chachua 67' (pen.)	Stadium: WOW Sport Center; Referee: Nahit Hasiev (Azerbaijan)

24 January 2017 Friendly match	Akzhayik Uralsk (Kazakhstan)	0 – 0	Karpaty Lviv	Antalya, Turkey
16:00 EET (UTC+2)		Report		Stadium: WOW Sport Center

6 February 2017 Friendly match	Samtredia (Georgia (country))	0 – 2	Karpaty Lviv	Antalya, Turkey
16:00 EET (UTC+2)		Report	Conti 1'; Khudobyak 35'	Stadium: WOW Sport Center

8 February 2017 Friendly match	Shakhtyor Soligorsk (Belarus)	0 – 1	Karpaty Lviv	Antalya, Turkey
10:30 EET (UTC+2)		Report	Chachua 87'

8 February 2017 Friendly match	Shakhtyor Soligorsk (Belarus)	2 – 2	Karpaty Lviv	Antalya, Turkey
16:00 EET (UTC+2)	Laptsew 36'; Aleksiyevich 86'	Report	Dytyatev 4'; Conti 34'	Stadium: WOW Sport Center

11 February 2017 Friendly match	Radnik Bijeljina (Bosnia and Herzegovina)	0 – 0	Karpaty Lviv	Antalya, Turkey
13:30 EET (UTC+2)		Report		Stadium: WOW Sport Center; Referee: ? (Moldova)

11 February 2017 Friendly match	Dinamo Minsk (Belarus)	1 – 2	Karpaty Lviv	Antalya, Turkey
16:00 EET (UTC+2)	Premudrov 6'		Ksyonz 18' (pen.); Khudobyak 31'	Stadium: WOW Sport Center; Referee: ? (Moldova)

14 February 2017 Friendly match	Fremad Amager (Denmark)	1 – 0	Karpaty Lviv	Antalya, Turkey
16:00 EET (UTC+2)	Jensen 65'	Report		Stadium: WOW Sport Center; Referee: ? (Kazakhstan)

=== Premier League ===
==== League table ====
Pos	Team	Pld	W	D	L	GF	GA	GD	Pts	Qualification or relegation
8	Stal Kamianske	22	6	6	10	20	25	−5	24	Qualification for the Relegation round
9	Zirka Kropyvnytskyi	22	6	5	11	20	33	−13	23	Qualification for the Relegation round
10	Karpaty Lviv (Note: Karpaty Lviv was deducted six points according to a decision by FIFA Disciplinary Committee on 4 March 2016.)	22	4	7	11	21	30	−9	13	Qualification for the Relegation round
11	FC Dnipro (Note: FC Dnipro was deducted a total of 12 points (six points by the FIFA Disciplinary Committee for failing to clear their debts with former coach Juande Ramos and his assistants, and six points by the Ukrainian Premier League for failing to comply with the decision of FIFA Disciplinary Committee to pay debts to former player Danilo Sousa Campos).)	22	4	10	8	21	30	−9	10	Qualification for the Relegation round
12	Volyn Lutsk	22	2	4	16	13	40	−27	10	Qualification for the Relegation round

Source: UEFA, Ukrainian Premier League, Soccerway
Rules for classification: 1) Points; 2) Goal difference; 3) Goals scored; 4) Head-to-head points; 5) Head-to-head goal difference; 6) Head-to-head goals scored; 7) Draw.

==== Results summary ====
Overall								Home						Away					
Pld	W	D	L	GF	GA	GD	Pts	W	D	L	GF	GA	GD	W	D	L	GF	GA	GD
32	9	9	14	35	41	−6	36	6	4	6	18	19	−1	3	5	8	17	22	−5

==== Matches ====
23 July 2016 1	Stal Kamianske	0 – 3	Karpaty Lviv	Dnipro
17:00 EEST (UTC+3)		Report	Chachua 41'; Blanco Leschuk 43', 61'	Stadium: Meteor Stadium; Attendance: 1,050; Referee: Ivan Bondar

31 July 2016 2	Karpaty Lviv	0 – 2	Dynamo Kyiv	Lviv
19:30 EEST (UTC+3)		Report	Yarmolenko 31', 84'	Stadium: Arena Lviv; Attendance: 10,044; Referee: Anatoliy Zhabchenko

7 August 2016 3	Vorskla Poltava	1 – 1	Karpaty Lviv	Poltava
19:30 EEST (UTC+3)	Kolomoyets 77'	Report	Hrysyo 25'	Stadium: Butovskyi Vorskla Stadium; Attendance: 1,200; Referee: Anatoliy Abdula

12 August 2016 4	Karpaty Lviv	2 – 3	Shakhtar Donetsk	Lviv
20:00 EEST (UTC+3)	Blanco Leschuk 27'; Chachua 37'	Report	Stepanenko 47'; Kovalenko 69'; Marlos 87'	Stadium: Arena Lviv; Attendance: 6,743; Referee: Kostyantyn Trukhanov

21 August 2016 5	Zorya Luhansk	2 – 1	Karpaty Lviv	Zaporizhya
19:30 EEST (UTC+3)	Hordiyenko 20'; Karavayev 87'	Report	Lobay 89'	Stadium: Slavutych-Arena; Attendance: 1,851; Referee: Serhiy Berezka

28 August 2016 6	Karpaty Lviv	0 – 2	Olimpik Donetsk	Lviv
17:00 EEST (UTC+3)		Report	Lysenko 26', 68'	Stadium: Arena Lviv; Attendance: 3,244; Referee: Dmytro Kutakov

11 September 2016 7	Zirka Kropyvnytskyi	1 – 0	Karpaty Lviv	Kropyvnytskyi
14:00 EEST (UTC+3)	Favorov 81' (pen.)	Report		Stadium: Zirka Stadium; Attendance: 4,207; Referee: Oleksandr Ivanov

17 September 2016 8	Karpaty Lviv	0 – 0	Chornomorets Odesa	Lviv
17:00 EEST (UTC+3)		Report		Stadium: Arena Lviv; Attendance: 2,858; Referee: Yaroslav Kozyk

25 September 2016 9	FC Oleksandriya	3 – 2	Karpaty Lviv	Oleksandria
19:30 EEST (UTC+3)	Zaporozhan 13' (pen.); Ponomar 71'; Lobay 81' (o.g.)	Report	Ksyonz 10'; Chachua 45'	Stadium: Nika Stadium; Attendance: 1,522; Referee: Yevhen Aranovskyi

2 October 2016 10	Volyn Lutsk	1 – 1	Karpaty Lviv	Lutsk
14:00 EEST (UTC+3)	Petrov 45+2'	Report	Khudobyak 84'	Stadium: Avanhard Stadium; Attendance: 4,600; Referee: Oleksandr Holovkov

16 October 2016 11	Karpaty Lviv	1 – 1	Dnipro	Lviv
19:30 EEST (UTC+3)	Blanco Leschuk 29'	Report	Kohut 38'	Stadium: Arena Lviv; Attendance: 2,308; Referee: Kateryna Monzul'

22 October 2016 12	Karpaty Lviv	0 – 1	Stal Kamianske	Lviv
17:00 EEST (UTC+3)		Report	Kalenchuk 26'	Stadium: Arena Lviv; Attendance: 1,200; Referee: Mykola Balakin

29 October 2016 13	Dynamo Kyiv	4 – 1	Karpaty Lviv	Kyiv
19:30 EEST (UTC+3)	Besyedin 18'; Vida 28'; Morozyuk 80'; Orikhovskyi 84'	Report	Zaviyskyi 86'	Stadium: Olympic Stadium; Attendance: 5,118; Referee: Yuriy Vaks

5 November 2016 14	Karpaty Lviv	1 – 0	Vorskla Poltava	Lviv
17:00 EET (UTC+2)	Blanco Leschuk 23'	Report		Stadium: Arena Lviv; Attendance: 1,330; Referee: Serhiy Berezka

19 November 2016 15	Shakhtar Donetsk	2 – 1	Karpaty Lviv	Kharkiv
17:00 EET (UTC+2)	Srna 10'; Ferreyra 77'	Report	Ksyonz 19' (pen.)	Stadium: Metalist Stadium; Attendance: 10,611; Referee: Serhiy Boyko

27 November 2016 16	Karpaty Lviv	2 – 2	Zorya Luhansk	Lviv
17:00 EET (UTC+2)	Khudobyak 12'; Blanco Leschuk 29'	Report	Sukhotskyi 22'; Ljubenović 90'	Stadium: Arena Lviv; Attendance: 1,923; Referee: Kostyantyn Trukhanov

11 December 2016 18	Karpaty Lviv	2 – 3	Zirka Kropyvnytskyi	Lviv
14:00 EET (UTC+2)	Blanco Leschuk 6'; Chachua 70'	Report	Batsula 30'; Pereyra 69'; Kucherenko 74'	Stadium: Arena Lviv; Attendance: 1,573; Referee: Oleksandr Derdo

26 February 2017 19	Chornomorets Odesa	1 – 0	Karpaty Lviv	Odesa
14:00 EET (UTC+2)	Smirnov 73'	Report		Stadium: Chornomorets Stadium; Attendance: 5,621; Referee: Anatoliy Abdula

5 March 2017 20	Karpaty Lviv	1 – 0	FC Oleksandriya	Lviv
14:00 EET (UTC+2)	Khudobyak 39'	Report		Stadium: Arena Lviv; Attendance: 4,143; Referee: Yevhen Aranovskyi

11 March 2017 21	Karpaty Lviv	2 – 1	Volyn Lutsk	Lviv
17:00 EET (UTC+2)	Hladkyi 18'; Khudobyak 53'	Report	Dudik 88'	Stadium: Arena Lviv; Attendance: 3,352; Referee: Oleksandr Ivanov

17 March 2017 22	Dnipro	0 – 0	Karpaty Lviv	Dnipro
17:00 EET (UTC+2)		Report		Stadium: Dnipro-Arena; Attendance: 2,932; Referee: Dmytro Kutakov

26 March 2017 17	Olimpik Donetsk	0 – 0	Karpaty Lviv	Cherkasy
14:00 EEST (UTC+3)		Report		Stadium: Central Stadium; Attendance: 1,500; Referee: Oleksandr Derdo

==== Relegation round ====
Pos	Team	Pld	W	D	L	GF	GA	GD	Pts	Qualification or relegation
7	Vorskla Poltava (Note: Vorskla Poltava was awarded the UPL Prestige Trophy for winning the consolation tournament.)	32	11	9	12	32	32	0	42	
8	Stal Kamianske	32	11	8	13	27	31	−4	41	
9	Zirka Kropyvnytskyi	32	9	7	16	29	43	−14	34	
10	Karpaty Lviv (Note: Karpaty Lviv was deducted six points according to a decision by FIFA Disciplinary Committee on 4 March 2016.)	32	9	9	14	35	41	−6	30	
11	FC Dnipro (Note: FC Dnipro was deducted a total of 24 points (six points by the FIFA Disciplinary Committee for failing to clear their debts with former coach Juande Ramos and his assistants, six points by the Ukrainian Premier League for failing to comply with the decision of FIFA Disciplinary Committee to pay debts to former player Danilo Sousa Campos, three more points by the FFU Control and Disciplinary Committee for failing execute one of the decisions of the committee, and 9 more points on 9 June 2017, after the end of the tournament.). On the decision of FIFA, FFU enforced relegation of FC Dnipro straight to the Second League, skipping the First League. In a near future FFU will adopt a decision which team will be replacing Dnipro in the First League.) (R)	32	8	13	11	31	40	−9	13	Relegation to Ukrainian Second League
12	Volyn Lutsk (Note: Volyn Lutsk was deducted six points on the request of Football Federation of Ukraine which received a letter from the FIFA Disciplinary Committee on 11 May 2017 urging to implement its decision of 15 March 2017, due to debts with former player Saša Stević.) (R)	32	4	4	24	17	51	−34	10	Relegation to Ukrainian First League

Source: UEFA, Ukrainian Premier League, Soccerway
Rules for classification: 1) Points; 2) Goal difference; 3) Goals scored; 4) Head-to-head points; 5) Head-to-head goal difference; 6) Head-to-head goals scored; 7) Draw.
(R) Relegated

==== Matches ====
2 April 2017 23	Karpaty Lviv	2 – 0	Stal Kamianske	Lviv
14:00 EEST (UTC+3)	Hladkyi 19' (pen.), 44'	Report		Stadium: Arena Lviv; Attendance: 4,217; Referee: Anatoliy Abdula

9 April 2017 24	Karpaty Lviv	2 – 2	Dnipro	Lviv
14:00 EEST (UTC+3)	Svatok 27' (o.g.); Khudobyak 68'	Report	Dovbyk 50', 64'	Stadium: Arena Lviv; Attendance: 4,963; Referee: Kostyantyn Trukhanov

15 April 2017 25	Vorskla Poltava	0 – 0	Karpaty Lviv	Poltava
14:00 EEST (UTC+3)		Report		Stadium: Butovskyi Vorskla Stadium; Attendance: 600; Referee: Yaroslav Kozyk

23 April 2017 26	Karpaty Lviv	1 – 0	Volyn Lutsk	Lviv
17:00 EEST (UTC+3)	Hutsulyak 17'	Report		Stadium: Arena Lviv; Attendance: 3,246; Referee: Anatoliy Zhabchenko

29 April 2017 27	Zirka Kropyvnytskyi	3 – 2	Karpaty Lviv	Kropyvnytskyi
14:00 EEST (UTC+3)	Bilonoh 26'; Zahalskyi 30' (pen.); Drachenko 45'	Report	Hladkyi 15' (pen.); Hutsulyak 50'	Stadium: Zirka Stadium; Attendance: 2,668; Referee: Serhiy Berezka

7 May 2017 28	Stal Kamianske	2 – 1	Karpaty Lviv	Dnipro
14:00 EEST (UTC+3)	Debelko 69'; Karasyuk 88'	Report	Nesterov 12'	Stadium: Meteor Stadium; Attendance: 942; Referee: Kateryna Monzul'

14 May 2017 29	Dnipro	2 – 3	Karpaty Lviv	Dnipro
19:30 EEST (UTC+3)	Kocherhin 47'; Dovbyk 54'	Report	Ksyonz 65'; Nesterov 70'; Hrysyo 73'	Stadium: Dnipro-Arena; Attendance: 4,654; Referee: Anatoliy Abdula

21 May 2017 30	Karpaty Lviv	0 – 1	Vorskla Poltava	Lviv
14:00 EEST (UTC+3)		Report	Sharpar 57'	Stadium: Arena Lviv; Attendance: 3,750; Referee: Mykola Kryvonosov

27 May 2017 31	Volyn Lutsk	0 – 1	Karpaty Lviv	Lviv
17:00 EEST (UTC+3)		Report	Hutsulyak 38'	Stadium: Ukraina Stadium; Attendance: 4,500; Referee: Yevhen Aranovskyi

31 May 2017 32	Karpaty Lviv	2 – 1	Zirka Kropyvnytskyi	Lviv
17:00 EEST (UTC+3)	Nesterov 22'; Matviyenko 66'	Report	Pryadun 11'	Stadium: Arena Lviv; Attendance: 1,851; Referee: Vitaliy Romanov

=== Ukrainian Cup ===
21 September 2016 Round of 32	Zhemchuzhyna Odesa	0 – 0 (4 – 5 p)	Karpaty Lviv	Odesa
16:00 EEST (UTC+3)		Report		Stadium: Spartak Stadium; Attendance: 2,100; Referee: Mykola Kryvonosov
	Penalties
	Palamar (penalty missed); Pospelov (penalty scored); Malysh (penalty scored); Ushakov (penalty scored); Potarochenko (penalty scored)		(penalty scored) Ksyonz; (penalty scored) Yaroshenko; (penalty scored) Kostevych; (penalty scored) Blanco Leschuk; (penalty scored) Novotryasov

26 October 2016 Round of 16	FC Poltava	2 – 1	Karpaty Lviv	Poltava
14:00 EEST (UTC+3)	Kovtun 4'; Troyanovskyi 43'	Report	Okechukwu 54'	Stadium: Lokomotyv Stadium; Attendance: 1,500; Referee: Mykola Kryvonosov

== Squad information ==
=== Squad and statistics ===
==== Squad, appearances and goals ====
As of 31 May 2017

No.	Pos	Nat	Player	Total		Premier League		Ukrainian Cup	
No.	Pos	Nat	Player	Apps	Goals	Apps	Goals	Apps	Goals
1	GK	(Ukraine) UKR	Roman Pidkivka	15	0	14	0	1	0
5	DF	(Ukraine) UKR	Andriy Nesterov	32	3	30	3	2	0
7	MF	(Ukraine) UKR	Pavlo Ksyonz	23	3	19+3	3	1	0
8	MF	(Ukraine) UKR	Artem Filimonov	8	0	7+1	0	0	0
9	FW	(Ukraine) UKR	Oleksiy Hutsulyak	13	3	7+6	3	0	0
10	FW	(Brazil) BRA	China	2	0	0+2	0	0	0
11	MF	(Ukraine) UKR	Ambrosiy Chachua	31	4	16+14	4	1	0
16	MF	(Ukraine) UKR	Ihor Khudobyak (C)	30	5	29	5	1	0
17	FW	(Ukraine) UKR	Maksym Salamakha	3	0	0+2	0	0+1	0
20	FW	(Ukraine) UKR	Dmytro Zayikyn	1	0	0+1	0	0	0
21	FW	(Ukraine) UKR	Oleksandr Hladkyi	13	4	13	4	0	0
22	DF	(Ukraine) UKR	Mykola Matviyenko	14	1	14	1	0	0
23	GK	(Ukraine) UKR	Roman Mysak	5	0	4	0	1	0
27	MF	(Ukraine) UKR	Oleh Holodyuk	6	0	6	0	0	0
34	DF	(Ukraine) UKR	Oleksiy Dytyatev	13	0	13	0	0	0
40	MF	(Ukraine) UKR	Ihor Bohach	3	0	0+3	0	0	0
42	DF	(Ukraine) UKR	Yevhen Zubeyko	18	0	15+1	0	2	0
47	MF	(Ukraine) UKR	Maksym Hrysyo	27	2	10+16	2	1	0
48	MF	(Ukraine) UKR	Dmytro Klyots	17	0	15+2	0	0	0
66	GK	(Ukraine) UKR	Yevhen Borovyk	14	0	14	0	0	0
70	DF	(Ukraine) UKR	Ivan Lobay	31	1	28+1	1	2	0
73	FW	(Ukraine) UKR	Taras Zaviyskyi	7	1	4+3	1	0	0
74	DF	(Ukraine) UKR	Nazar Vyzdryk	1	0	0+1	0	0	0
77	FW	(Ukraine) UKR	Viktor Khomchenko	3	0	0+3	0	0	0
88	MF	(Ukraine) UKR	Nazar Verbnyi	20	0	15+4	0	1	0
94	DF	(Ukraine) UKR	Denys Miroshnichenko	27	0	17+9	0	1	0
Players away from the club on loan:
3	DF	(Ukraine) UKR	Vasyl Kravets	17	0	12+3	0	2	0
79	DF	(Ukraine) UKR	Andriy Markovych	4	0	0+4	0	0	0
Players featured for Karpaty but left before the end of the season:
8	DF	(Ukraine) UKR	Volodymyr Kostevych	18	0	16	0	2	0
9	FW	(Argentina) ARG	Gustavo Blanco Leschuk	19	7	17	7	2	0
19	MF	(Ukraine) UKR	Serhiy Rudyka	5	0	1+4	0	0	0
21	MF	(Ukraine) UKR	Kostyantyn Yaroshenko	7	0	4+1	0	1+1	0
26	DF	(Ukraine) UKR	Artur Novotryasov	9	0	8	0	0+1	0
27	MF	(Ukraine) UKR	Vadym Strashkevych	2	0	0+1	0	0+1	0
28	MF	(Ukraine) UKR	Yevhen Chumak	4	0	1+2	0	0+1	0
77	FW	(Armenia) ARM	Heham Kadymyan	8	0	3+4	0	1	0
98	FW	(Nigeria) NGR	Gabriel Okechukwu	3	1	0+2	0	0+1	1

==== Goalscorers ====
As of 31 May 2017

Place	Position	Nation	Number	Name	Premier League	Ukrainian Cup	Total
1	FW	(Argentina)	9	Gustavo Blanco Leschuk	7	0	7
2	MF	(Ukraine)	16	Ihor Khudobyak	5	0	5
3	MF	(Ukraine)	11	Ambrosiy Chachua	4	0	4
3	FW	(Ukraine)	21	Oleksandr Hladkyi	4	0	4
5	MF	(Ukraine)	7	Pavlo Ksyonz	3	0	3
5	FW	(Ukraine)	9	Oleksiy Hutsulyak	3	0	3
5	DF	(Ukraine)	5	Andriy Nesterov	3	0	3
8	MF	(Ukraine)	47	Maksym Hrysyo	2	0	2
9	DF	(Ukraine)	70	Ivan Lobay	1	0	1
9	FW	(Nigeria)	98	Gabriel Okechukwu	0	1	1
9	FW	(Ukraine)	73	Taras Zaviyskyi	1	0	1
9	DF	(Ukraine)	22	Mykola Matviyenko	1	0	1
9				Own goal	1	0	1
				TOTALS	35	1	36

==== Disciplinary record ====
As of 31 May 2017

Number	Nation	Position	Name	Total		Premier League		Ukrainian Cup	
Number	Nation	Position	Name	Yellow card	Red card	Yellow card	Red card	Yellow card	Red card
1	(Ukraine)	GK	Roman Pidkivka	2	0	2	0	0	0
3	(Ukraine)	DF	Vasyl Kravets	6	0	6	0	0	0
5	(Ukraine)	DF	Andriy Nesterov	8	0	8	0	0	0
7	(Ukraine)	MF	Pavlo Ksyonz	7	1	7	1	0	0
8	(Ukraine)	DF	Volodymyr Kostevych	4	0	4	0	0	0
8	(Ukraine)	MF	Artem Filimonov	4	0	4	0	0	0
9	(Argentina)	FW	Gustavo Blanco Leschuk	3	0	3	0	0	0
9	(Ukraine)	FW	Oleksiy Hutsulyak	1	0	1	0	0	0
10	(Brazil)	FW	China	1	0	1	0	0	0
11	(Ukraine)	MF	Ambrosiy Chachua	3	1	3	1	0	0
16	(Ukraine)	MF	Ihor Khudobyak	5	0	4	0	1	0
19	(Ukraine)	MF	Serhiy Rudyka	2	0	2	0	0	0
21	(Ukraine)	MF	Kostyantyn Yaroshenko	1	0	1	0	0	0
21	(Ukraine)	FW	Oleksandr Hladkyi	3	0	3	0	0	0
22	(Ukraine)	DF	Mykola Matviyenko	1	0	1	0	0	0
23	(Ukraine)	GK	Roman Mysak	1	0	1	0	0	0
26	(Ukraine)	DF	Artur Novotryasov	4	1	4	1	0	0
27	(Ukraine)	MF	Oleh Holodyuk	1	0	1	0	0	0
28	(Ukraine)	MF	Yevhen Chumak	2	0	1	0	1	0
34	(Ukraine)	DF	Oleksiy Dytyatev	3	1	3	1	0	0
42	(Ukraine)	DF	Yevhen Zubeyko	5	0	5	0	0	0
47	(Ukraine)	MF	Maksym Hrysyo	5	0	4	0	1	0
48	(Ukraine)	MF	Dmytro Klyots	4	0	4	0	0	0
66	(Ukraine)	GK	Yevhen Borovyk	1	0	1	0	0	0
70	(Ukraine)	DF	Ivan Lobay	3	0	2	0	1	0
73	(Ukraine)	FW	Taras Zaviyskyi	1	0	1	0	0	0
79	(Ukraine)	DF	Andriy Markovych	1	0	1	0	0	0
88	(Ukraine)	MF	Nazar Verbnyi	5	0	5	0	0	0
94	(Ukraine)	DF	Denys Miroshnichenko	3	0	3	0	0	0
			TOTALS	90	4	86	4	4	0

=== Transfers ===
==== In ====
No.	Pos.	Nat.	Name	Age	Moving from	Type	Transfer Window	Contract ends	Transfer fee	Sources
20	FW	(Ukraine)	Dmytro Zayikyn	19	Skala Stryi	—	Summer	30 June 2019	—	
17	FW	(Ukraine)	Maksym Salamakha	20	Dnipro	—	Summer	2019	—	
5	DF	(Ukraine)	Andriy Nesterov	26	(Moldova) Zaria Bălți	End of contract	Summer	2018	—	
19	MF	(Ukraine)	Serhiy Rudyka	28	(Belarus) Shakhtyor Soligorsk	Released	Summer	30 June 2018	—	
21	MF	(Ukraine)	Kostyantyn Yaroshenko	30	—	Free Agent	—	—	Free	
42	DF	(Ukraine)	Yevhen Zubeyko	26	—	Free Agent	—	—	Free	
28	MF	(Ukraine)	Yevhen Chumak	21	Dynamo Kyiv	Released	—	30 June 2018	Free	
66	GK	(Ukraine)	Yevhen Borovyk	31	Chornomorets Odesa	—	Winter	31 December 2018	Free	
8	MF	(Ukraine)	Artem Filimonov	22	Chornomorets Odesa	—	Winter	31 December 2018	Free	
34	DF	(Ukraine)	Oleksiy Dytyatev	28	Vorskla Poltava	—	Winter	31 December 2019	Free	
77	FW	(Ukraine)	Viktor Khomchenko	22	Volyn Lutsk	Transfer	Winter	31 December 2021	$50,000	
9	FW	(Ukraine)	Oleksiy Hutsulyak	19	(Spain) Villarreal B	End of loan	Winter	—	Free	
24	DF	(Argentina)	Cristian Paz	21	(Argentina) Temperley	Loan	Winter	30 June 2017	—	
22	DF	(Ukraine)	Mykola Matviyenko	20	Shakhtar Donetsk	Loan	Winter	30 June 2017	—	
27	MF	(Ukraine)	Oleh Holodyuk	29	Vorskla Poltava	Transfer	Winter	30 June 2018	Free	
21	FW	(Ukraine)	Oleksandr Hladkyi	29	Dynamo Kyiv	Loan	Winter	30 June 2017	—	
10	FW	(Brazil)	China	20	(Brazil) Vai-Vai	—	Winter	31 December 2021	—	

==== Out ====
No.	Pos.	Nat	Name	Age	Moving to	Type	Transfer Window	Transfer fee	Sources
77	MF	(Georgia (country))	Murtaz Daushvili	27	(Hungary) Diósgyőr	End of contract	Summer	Free	
5	DF	(Ukraine)	Andriy Hitchenko	31	FC Oleksandriya	End of contract	Summer	Free	
9	MF	(Ukraine)	Denys Kozhanov	28	Shakhtar Donetsk	Loan return	Summer	Free	
21	DF	(Ukraine)	Yevhen Neplyakh	24	Veres Rivne	End of contract	Summer	Free	
22	FW	(Ukraine)	Taras Puchkovskyi	21	Veres Rivne	End of contract	Summer	Free	
97	FW	(Ukraine)	Oleksiy Hutsulyak	18	(Spain) Villarreal B	Loan	Summer	€200,000	
32	DF	(Ukraine)	Ihor Plastun	25	(Bulgaria) Ludogorets Razgrad	Transfer	Summer	€500,000	
17	MF	(Ukraine)	Oleh Holodyuk	28	Vorskla Poltava	End of contract	Summer	Free	
—	FW	(Ukraine)	Mykhaylo Serhiychuk	24	Veres Rivne	End of contract	Summer	Free	
19	MF	(Ukraine)	Serhiy Rudyka	28	Illichivets Mariupol	Released	—	Free	
26	DF	(Ukraine)	Artur Novotryasov	24	—	Released	—	Free	
10	MF	(Ukraine)	Artur Karnoza	26	—	End of contract	Winter	Free	
21	MF	(Ukraine)	Kostyantyn Yaroshenko	30	—	End of contract	Winter	Free	
98	FW	(Nigeria)	Gabriel Okechukwu	21	—	End of contract	Winter	Free	
27	MF	(Ukraine)	Vadym Strashkevych	22	—	End of contract	Winter	Free	
28	MF	(Ukraine)	Yevhen Chumak	21	—	Released	Winter	Free	
77	FW	(Armenia)	Heham Kadymyan	24	Zorya Luhansk	Released	Winter	Free	
8	DF	(Ukraine)	Volodymyr Kostevych	24	(Poland) Lech Poznań	End of contract	Winter	€350,000	
9	FW	(Argentina)	Gustavo Blanco Leschuk	25	Shakhtar Donetsk	Transfer	Winter	€400,000	
3	DF	(Ukraine)	Vasyl Kravets	19	(Spain) Lugo	Loan	Winter	?	
79	DF	(Ukraine)	Andriy Markovych	21	(Belarus) Naftan Novopolotsk	Loan	Winter	?	

=== Managerial changes ===
Outgoing head coach	Manner of departure	Date of vacancy	Table	Incoming head coach	Date of appointment
(Ukraine) Volodymyr Bezubyak	End of contract	8 May	Pre-season	(Ukraine) Valeriy Yaremchenko	6 June
(Ukraine) Valeriy Yaremchenko	Unknown	17 June	Pre-season	(Ukraine) Anatoliy Chantsev (interim)	17 June
(Ukraine) Anatoliy Chantsev (interim)	Health problems	5 July	Pre-season	(Ukraine) Serhiy Zaytsev (interim)	5 July
(Ukraine) Serhiy Zaytsev (interim)	End as interim	7 October	12th	(Belarus) Oleg Dulub	7 October
