= 2014–15 FC Karpaty Lviv season =

Karpaty Lviv
2014–15 season
- Chairman: (Ukraine) Petro Dyminsky
- Manager: (Croatia) Igor Jovićević (interim)
- Stadium: Ukraina Stadium, Lviv
- Premier League: 13th
- Ukrainian Cup: Round of 16
- Top goalscorer: League: Gregor Balažic (4); All: Gregor Balažic (4)
- Highest home attendance: 11,800 vs Dynamo; 24 May 2014
- Lowest home attendance: 2,100 vs Hoverla; 30 November 2014

The 2014–15 FC Karpaty Lviv season was the 52nd season in club history.

== Review and events ==
On 15 June 2014 FC Karpaty gathered at club's base for medical inspection after vacations and were introduced a new manager, Igor Jovićević, few days later. On 1 July 2014 Karpaty went for two and half week long pre-season training camp in Slovenia with seven friendly matches scheduled.

On contrary to the previous season club decided to use their own young players rather than experienced loanees, thus losing all attacking potential before the start of season, including such crucial players as Oleksandr Hladkyi, Sergei Zenjov and Mladen Bartulović who together scored 26 out of the 32 Karpaty goals in 2013–14 Ukrainian Premier League.

== Competitions ==
=== Friendly matches ===
==== Pre-season ====
2 July 2014 Friendly match	Žilina (Slovakia)	1–2	Karpaty Lviv	Žilina, Slovakia
17:00 CEST (UTC+2)	Lupčo 38'	Report	Serhiychuk 21', 30'	Stadium: Štadión pod Dubňom; Attendance: 500

5 July 2014 Friendly match	Dinamo Zagreb (Croatia)	2–0	Karpaty Lviv	Murska Sobota, Slovenia
17:00 CEST (UTC+2)	Čop 39'; Brozović 73'	Report		Stadium: Fazanerija; Attendance: 50

7 July 2014 Friendly match	Slavia Sofia (Bulgaria)	0–0	Karpaty Lviv	Hočko Pohorje, Slovenia
18:00 CEST (UTC+2)		Report		Referee: Marko Lačkovič (Slovenia)

10 July 2014 Friendly match	Maribor (Slovenia)	1–2	Karpaty Lviv	Maribor, Slovenia
19:30 CEST (UTC+2)	Šuler 66'	Report	Holodyuk 55'; Puchkovskyi 77'	Stadium: Ljudski vrt Attendance: 400; Referee: Bojan Tkalčič (Slovenia)

12 July 2014 Friendly match	Lokomotiva Zagreb (Croatia)	1–1	Karpaty Lviv	Hočko Pohorje, Slovenia
11:00 CEST (UTC+2)	Pajač 66' (pen.)	Report	Bokhashvili 53' (pen.)

13 July 2014 Friendly match	Khazar Lankaran (Azerbaijan)	2–1	Karpaty Lviv	Bučkovci, Slovenia
17:45 CEST (UTC+2)	Nildo 47'; Thiego 82'	Report	Holodyuk 32'	Referee: Darian Kovačič (Slovenia)

16 July 2014 Friendly match	Jūrmala (Latvia)	0–2	Karpaty Lviv	Slovenia
16:30 CEST (UTC+2)		Report	Marusych 74', 77'

==== Winter break ====
23 January 2015 Friendly match	Split (Croatia)	1–1	Karpaty Lviv	Belek, Turkey
16:00 EET (UTC+2)	Bilić 15'	Report	Mance 35'

26 January 2015 Friendly match	Górnik Zabrze (Poland)	0–0	Karpaty Lviv	Manavgat, Turkey
17:00 EET (UTC+2)		Report

31 January 2015 Friendly match	Admira Wacker Mödling (Austria)	0–0	Karpaty Lviv	Manavgat, Turkey
17:00 EET (UTC+2)		Report

9 February 2015 Friendly match	OFK Belgrade (Serbia)	2–2	Karpaty Lviv	Manavgat, Turkey
17:00 EET (UTC+2)	Mrdaković 5'; Zdjelar 59'	Report	Ksyonz 15'; Holodyuk 55'	Stadium: Pitch of Starlight Hotel

12 February 2015 Friendly match	Oțelul Galați (Romania)	2–3	Karpaty Lviv	Manavgat, Turkey
11:30 EET (UTC+2)	Hamroun 20'; Sanaa 25'	Report	Hutsulyak 5'; Mance 43'; Ksyonz 90'	Stadium: Pitch of Starlight Hotel

12 February 2015 Friendly match	Levski Sofia (Bulgaria)	3–3	Karpaty Lviv	Belek, Turkey
17:10 EET (UTC+2)	Ninu 35'; Domovchiyski 70'; Abdi 90'	Report	Hitchenko 40'; Shved 45', 90+1'	Attendance: 0

16 February 2015 Friendly match	Bansko (Bulgaria)	0–0	Karpaty Lviv	Manavgat, Turkey
11:00 EET (UTC+2)		Report

16 February 2015 Friendly match	Akzhayik Uralsk (Kazakhstan)	1–2	Karpaty Lviv	Manavgat, Turkey
15:00 EET (UTC+2)	Serikzhanov 85'	Report	Holodyuk 28'; Mance 45'

24 February 2015 Friendly match	Karpaty Lviv	2–0	Stal Dniprodzerzhynsk	Lviv
15:00 EET (UTC+2)	Hitchenko 63'; Hutsulyak 73'	Report		Stadium: Ukraina Stadium; Referee: Andriy Hrysyo

==== Mid-season ====
22 March 2015 Friendly match	Karpaty Lviv	2–1	Rukh Vynnyky	Lviv
15:00 EET (UTC+2)	Serhiychuk; Savoshko	Report	Makar	Stadium: SKA Stadium

30 March 2015 Friendly match	Žalgiris Vilnius (Lithuania)	0–0	Karpaty Lviv	Vilnius, Lithuania
19:30 EEST (UTC+3)		Report		Stadium: LFF Stadium

=== Premier League ===
==== League table ====
Pos	Team	Pld	W	D	L	GF	GA	GD	Pts	Qualification or relegation
10	Metalurh Donetsk (Note: Metalurh Donetsk were deducted a total of 6 points on decision of the FIFA Disciplinary Committee (9 September 2014). After the season completed the president of FC Stal Dniprodzerzhynsk announced that the club will be merged with FC Metalurh Donetsk and replace them in the Premier League for the 2015–16 season. (14 June 2015))	26	6	10	10	27	38	−11	22	Club folded after the season
11	Chornomorets Odesa	25	3	11	11	15	31	−16	20	
12	Hoverla Uzhhorod	26	3	10	13	22	47	−25	19	
13	Karpaty Lviv (Note: Karpaty Lviv were deducted a total of 9 points. Initially three points were deducted and then additional 6 points for non compliance with contractual agreements with player agents (regarding Martin Bogatinov).)	26	5	9	12	22	31	−9	15	
14	Illichivets Mariupol (R)	26	3	5	18	25	55	−30	14	Relegation to Ukrainian First League

Source: uafootball.net.ua
Rules for classification: 1) points; 2) goal difference; 3) goals scored; 4) head-to-head points; 5) head-to-head goal difference; 6) head-to-head goals scored; 7) fair play rating
(R) Relegated

==== Results summary ====
Overall								Home						Away					
Pld	W	D	L	GF	GA	GD	Pts	W	D	L	GF	GA	GD	W	D	L	GF	GA	GD
26	5	9	12	22	31	−9	24	4	2	7	13	15	−2	1	7	5	9	16	−7

==== Matches ====
27 July 2014 1	Hoverla Uzhhorod	2–2	Karpaty Lviv	Uzhhorod
17:00 EEST (UTC+3)	Shatskikh 15'; Tudose 78'	Report	Puchkovskyi 61'; Balažic 74'	Stadium: Avanhard Stadium; Attendance: 2,750; Referee: Yuriy Moseychuk

3 August 2014 2	Karpaty Lviv	0–1	Metalurh Donetsk	Lviv
19:30 EEST (UTC+3)		Report	Lazić 19'	Stadium: Ukraina Stadium; Attendance: 7,800; Referee: Serhiy Berezka

10 August 2014 3	Dnipro Dnipropetrovsk	4–0	Karpaty Lviv	Dnipropetrovsk
19:30 EEST (UTC+3)	Bruno Gama 47'; Shakhov 65', 75'; Kalinić 83'	Report		Stadium: Dnipro Arena; Attendance: 12,668; Referee: Serhiy Lysenchuk

17 August 2014 4	Volyn Lutsk	0–2	Karpaty Lviv	Lutsk
19:30 EEST (UTC+3)		Report	Kozhanov 39'; Balažic 56'	Stadium: Avanhard Stadium; Attendance: 7,000; Referee: Oleksandr Ivanov

31 August 2014 5	Karpaty Lviv	1–2	Metalurh Zaporizhya	Lviv
17:00 EEST (UTC+3)	Hitchenko 30'	Report	Tatarkov 90'; Lyopa 90+2'	Stadium: Arena Lviv; Attendance: 8,237; Referee: Kostyantyn Trukhanov

14 September 2014 6	Vorskla Poltava	2–0	Karpaty Lviv	Poltava
19:30 EEST (UTC+3)	Dedechko 80'; Kovpak 88'	Report		Stadium: Butovskyi Vorskla Stadium; Attendance: 7,000; Referee: Dmytro Kutakov

21 September 2014 7	Karpaty Lviv	3–3	Metalist Kharkiv	Lviv
19:30 EEST (UTC+3)	Holodyuk 26'; Kozhanov 35'; Balažic 90+4'	Report	Bolbat 17'; Xavier 23' (pen.); Jajá 54'	Stadium: Ukraina Stadium; Attendance: 6,400; Referee: Yaroslav Kozyk

4 October 2014 8	Olimpik Donetsk	1–0	Karpaty Lviv	Kyiv
14:00 EEST (UTC+3)	Doroshenko 65'	Report		Stadium: Bannikov Stadium; Attendance: 850; Referee: Anatoliy Abdula

19 October 2014 9	Karpaty Lviv	1–0	Illichivets Mariupol	Lviv
17:00 EEST (UTC+3)	Balažic 90+3'	Report		Stadium: Ukraina Stadium; Attendance: 6,400; Referee: Vitaliy Romanov

2 November 2014 11	Karpaty Lviv	1–2	Zorya Luhansk	Lviv
17:00 EET (UTC+2)	Serhiychuk 31'	Report	Vernydub 13'; Khomchenovskyi 83'	Stadium: Ukraina Stadium; Attendance: 4,400; Referee: Yaroslav Kozyk

9 November 2014 12	Dynamo Kyiv	0–0	Karpaty Lviv	Kyiv
19:30 EET (UTC+2)		Report		Stadium: Olympic Stadium; Attendance: 14,369; Referee: Yuriy Moseychuk

21 November 2014 13	Karpaty Lviv	0–2	Shakhtar Donetsk	Lviv
19:00 EET (UTC+2)		Report	Teixeira 10'; Luiz Adriano 22'	Stadium: Ukraina Stadium; Attendance: 8,900; Referee: Viktor Shvetsov

30 November 2014 14	Karpaty Lviv	1–0	Hoverla Uzhhorod	Lviv
19:30 EET (UTC+2)	Kostevych 74'	Report		Stadium: Ukraina Stadium; Attendance: 2,100; Referee: Anatoliy Abdula

7 December 2014 10	Chornomorets Odesa	0–0	Karpaty Lviv	Odesa
17:00 EET (UTC+2)		Report		Stadium: Chornomorets Stadium; Attendance: 7,060; Referee: Vitaliy Romanov

1 March 2015 15	Metalurh Donetsk	1–1	Karpaty Lviv	Kyiv
17:00 EET (UTC+2)	Morozyuk 2'	Report	Plastun 66'	Stadium: Obolon Arena; Attendance: 2,200; Referee: Yaroslav Kozyk

8 March 2015 16	Karpaty Lviv	0–1	Dnipro Dnipropetrovsk	Lviv
19:30 EET (UTC+2)		Report	Kalinić 4'	Stadium: Ukraina Stadium; Attendance: 5,530; Referee: Anatoliy Abdula

13 March 2015 17	Karpaty Lviv	0–2	Volyn Lutsk	Lviv
19:00 EET (UTC+2)		Report	Kobakhidze 24'; Bicfalvi 90+2' (pen.)	Stadium: Ukraina Stadium; Attendance: 2,350; Referee: Serhiy Berezka

5 April 2015 18	Metalurh Zaporizhya	2–1	Karpaty Lviv	Zaporizhya
19:30 EEST (UTC+3)	Lysytskyi 79' (pen.); Kapliyenko 80'	Report	Strashkevych 35'	Stadium: Slavutych-Arena; Attendance: 2,200; Referee: Dmytro Kutakov

13 April 2015 19	Karpaty Lviv	0–0	Vorskla Poltava	Lviv
14:00 EEST (UTC+3)		Report		Stadium: Ukraina Stadium; Attendance: 3,300; Referee: Oleksandr Holovkov

18 April 2015 20	Metalist Kharkiv	0–0	Karpaty Lviv	Kharkiv
14:00 EEST (UTC+3)		Report		Stadium: Metalist Stadium; Attendance: 6,285; Referee: Serhiy Skrypak

26 April 2015 21	Karpaty Lviv	4–1	Olimpik Donetsk	Lviv
14:00 EEST (UTC+3)	Khudobyak 20', 72'; Shved 38', 69'	Report	Kadymyan 56'	Stadium: Ukraina Stadium; Attendance: 5,750; Referee: Ivan Bondar

2 May 2015 22	Illichivets Mariupol	1–0	Karpaty Lviv	Dnipropetrovsk
14:00 EEST (UTC+3)	Hryn 48'	Report		Stadium: Meteor Stadium; Attendance: 220; Referee: Yevhen Aranovskyi

10 May 2015 23	Karpaty Lviv	2–0	Chornomorets Odesa	Lviv
17:00 EEST (UTC+3)	Kostevych 78'; Strashkevych 87'	Report		Stadium: Ukraina Stadium; Attendance: 7,820; Referee: Oleksandr Holovkov

16 May 2015 24	Zorya Luhansk	1–1	Karpaty Lviv	Zaporizhya
19:30 EEST (UTC+3)	Ljubenović 34'	Report	Plastun 36'	Stadium: Slavutych-Arena; Attendance: 1,100; Referee: Serhiy Berezka

24 May 2015 25	Karpaty Lviv	0–1	Dynamo Kyiv	Lviv
19:30 EEST (UTC+3)		Report	Kravets 58'	Stadium: Ukraina Stadium; Attendance: 11,800; Referee: Oleksandr Derdo

30 May 2015 26	Shakhtar Donetsk	2–2	Karpaty Lviv	Kyiv
19:30 EEST (UTC+3)	Kryvtsov 33'; Teixeira 37'	Report	Karnoza 47'; Khudobyak 62'	Stadium: Obolon Arena; Attendance: 3,200; Referee: Yuriy Moseychuk

=== Ukrainian Cup ===
23 August 2014 Round of 32	Chaika Kyiv-Sviatoshyn Raion	0–4	Karpaty Lviv	Irpin
17:00 EEST (UTC+3)		Report	Holodyuk 10'; Ksyonz 25'; Serhiychuk 32'; Kostevych 48'	Stadium: University of State Taxation Service Stadium; Attendance: 1,000; Referee: Volodymyr Milanych

27 September 2014 Round of 16. 1st leg	Karpaty Lviv	0–1	Dynamo Kyiv	Lviv
19:30 EEST (UTC+3)		Report	Teodorczyk 5'	Stadium: Ukraina Stadium; Attendance: 11,200; Referee: Yuriy Vaks

28 October 2014 Round of 16. 2nd leg	Dynamo Kyiv	1–0 (2–0 agg.)	Karpaty Lviv	Kyiv
19:00 EET (UTC+2)	Husyev 90+1'	Report		Stadium: Olympic Stadium; Attendance: 11,310; Referee: Oleksandr Ivanov

== Squad information ==
=== Squad and statistics ===
==== Squad, appearances and goals ====
As of 30 May 2015

No.	Pos	Nat	Player	Total		Premier League		Ukrainian Cup	
No.	Pos	Nat	Player	Apps	Goals	Apps	Goals	Apps	Goals
5	DF	(Ukraine) UKR	Andriy Hitchenko (C)	23	1	21	1	2	0
8	DF	(Ukraine) UKR	Volodymyr Kostevych	26	3	23	2	3	1
9	MF	(Ukraine) UKR	Denys Kozhanov	27	2	19+5	2	3	0
10	MF	(Ukraine) UKR	Artur Karnoza	15	1	5+9	1	1	0
14	FW	(Ukraine) UKR	Mykhaylo Serhiychuk	24	2	13+8	1	2+1	1
16	MF	(Ukraine) UKR	Ihor Khudobyak	25	3	17+6	3	0+2	0
17	MF	(Ukraine) UKR	Oleh Holodyuk	28	2	22+3	1	2+1	1
18	FW	(Ukraine) UKR	Mykhaylo Kopolovets	7	0	0+7	0	0	0
20	MF	(Georgia (country)) GEO	Murtaz Daushvili	20	0	12+5	0	3	0
22	DF	(Ukraine) UKR	Taras Puchkovskyi	9	1	2+6	1	0+1	0
23	GK	(Ukraine) UKR	Roman Mysak	23	0	20	0	3	0
26	DF	(Ukraine) UKR	Artur Novotryasov	7	0	6	0	1	0
27	MF	(Ukraine) UKR	Vadym Strashkevych	14	2	6+7	2	0+1	0
32	DF	(Ukraine) UKR	Ihor Plastun	24	2	21	2	3	0
35	FW	(Ukraine) UKR	Maryan Shved	10	2	8+2	2	0	0
45	FW	(Ukraine) UKR	Yuriy Zakharkiv	1	0	0+1	0	0	0
48	MF	(Ukraine) UKR	Dmytro Klyots	10	0	10	0	0	0
70	DF	(Ukraine) UKR	Ivan Lobay	2	0	2	0	0	0
76	FW	(Ukraine) UKR	Oleksiy Hutsulyak	7	0	1+6	0	0	0
86	DF	(Ukraine) UKR	Vasyl Kravets	2	0	0+2	0	0	0
92	MF	(Ukraine) UKR	Ambrosiy Chachua	22	0	16+4	0	1+1	0
94	DF	(Ukraine) UKR	Denys Miroshnichenko	29	0	26	0	3	0
Players away from the club on loan:
7	MF	(Ukraine) UKR	Pavlo Ksyonz	17	1	14	0	3	1
Players featured for Karpaty but left before the end of the season:
4	DF	(Slovenia) SLO	Gregor Balažic	15	4	12+1	4	2	0
19	MF	(Ukraine) UKR	Yaroslav Martynyuk	10	0	4+3	0	1+2	0
29	GK	(Ukraine) UKR	Oleksandr Ilyuschenkov	6	0	6	0	0	0
41	MF	(Ukraine) UKR	Maksym Marusych	2	0	0+2	0	0	0

==== Goalscorers ====
As of 30 May 2015

Place	Position	Nation	Number	Name	Premier League	Ukrainian Cup	Total
1	DF	(Slovenia)	4	Gregor Balažic	4	0	4
2	DF	(Ukraine)	8	Volodymyr Kostevych	2	1	3
2	MF	(Ukraine)	16	Ihor Khudobyak	3	0	3
4	MF	(Ukraine)	17	Oleh Holodyuk	1	1	2
4	MF	(Ukraine)	9	Denys Kozhanov	2	0	2
4	FW	(Ukraine)	14	Mykhaylo Serhiychuk	1	1	2
4	FW	(Ukraine)	35	Maryan Shved	2	0	2
4	MF	(Ukraine)	27	Vadym Strashkevych	2	0	2
4	DF	(Ukraine)	32	Ihor Plastun	2	0	2
10	DF	(Ukraine)	22	Taras Puchkovskyi	1	0	1
10	MF	(Ukraine)	7	Pavlo Ksyonz	0	1	1
10	DF	(Ukraine)	5	Andriy Hitchenko	1	0	1
10	MF	(Ukraine)	10	Artur Karnoza	1	0	1
				TOTALS	22	4	26

==== Disciplinary record ====
As of 30 May 2015

Number	Nation	Position	Name	Total		Premier League		Ukrainian Cup	
Number	Nation	Position	Name	Yellow card	Red card	Yellow card	Red card	Yellow card	Red card
4	(Slovenia)	DF	Gregor Balažic	4	0	4	0	0	0
5	(Ukraine)	DF	Andriy Hitchenko	6	0	6	0	0	0
7	(Ukraine)	MF	Pavlo Ksyonz	2	0	2	0	0	0
8	(Ukraine)	DF	Volodymyr Kostevych	3	0	3	0	0	0
9	(Ukraine)	MF	Denys Kozhanov	4	0	4	0	0	0
10	(Ukraine)	MF	Artur Karnoza	2	0	2	0	0	0
14	(Ukraine)	FW	Mykhaylo Serhiychuk	4	0	4	0	0	0
16	(Ukraine)	MF	Ihor Khudobyak	3	0	3	0	0	0
17	(Ukraine)	MF	Oleh Holodyuk	8	0	7	0	1	0
18	(Ukraine)	FW	Mykhaylo Kopolovets	2	0	2	0	0	0
19	(Ukraine)	MF	Yaroslav Martynyuk	4	0	3	0	1	0
20	(Georgia (country))	MF	Murtaz Daushvili	7	1	6	1	1	0
22	(Ukraine)	DF	Taras Puchkovskyi	1	0	0	0	1	0
23	(Ukraine)	GK	Roman Mysak	2	0	1	0	1	0
26	(Ukraine)	DF	Artur Novotryasov	1	0	1	0	0	0
27	(Ukraine)	MF	Vadym Strashkevych	2	0	2	0	0	0
32	(Ukraine)	DF	Ihor Plastun	5	1	5	1	0	0
48	(Ukraine)	MF	Dmytro Klyots	4	0	4	0	0	0
76	(Ukraine)	FW	Oleksiy Hutsulyak	1	0	1	0	0	0
86	(Ukraine)	DF	Vasyl Kravets	1	0	1	0	0	0
92	(Ukraine)	MF	Ambrosiy Chachua	2	0	1	0	1	0
94	(Ukraine)	DF	Denys Miroshnichenko	3	0	2	0	1	0
			TOTALS	71	2	64	2	7	0

=== Transfers ===
==== In ====
No.	Pos.	Nat.	Name	Age	Moving from	Type	Transfer Window	Contract ends	Transfer fee	Sources
—	MF	(Ukraine)	Artur Karnoza	23	FC Sevastopol	End of contract	Summer	2017	Free	
41	MF	(Ukraine)	Maksym Marusych	21	Vorskla Poltava	End of contract	Summer	2018	Free	
9	MF	(Ukraine)	Denys Kozhanov	27	Shakhtar Donetsk	Loan	Summer	2015	—	

==== Out ====
No.	Pos.	Nat	Name	Age	Moving to	Type	Transfer Window	Transfer fee	Sources
30	FW	(Belarus)	Leonid Kovel	27	(Belarus) FC Minsk	Released	Summer	Free	
15	FW	(Cameroon)	Armand Ken Ella	21	—	End of contract	Summer	—	
77	FW	(Ukraine)	Yevhen Bokhashvili	21	Dnipro Dnipropetrovsk	End of loan	Summer	—	
39	FW	(Ukraine)	Denys Vasin	25	—	Released	Summer	—	
9	FW	(Ukraine)	Yuriy Habovda	25	—	Released	Summer	—	
19	MF	(Ukraine)	Yaroslav Martynyuk	25	—	Released	Winter	—	
4	DF	(Slovenia)	Gregor Balažic	26	(Serbia) FK Partizan	—	Transfer	Winter	

=== Managerial changes ===
Outgoing head coach	Manner of departure	Date of vacancy	Table	Incoming head coach	Date of appointment
(Ukraine) Oleksandr Sevidov	Mutual agreement	16 June	Pre-season	(Croatia) Igor Jovićević (interim)	18 June
