= 2015–16 FC Karpaty Lviv season =

Karpaty Lviv
2015–16 season
- Chairman: (Ukraine) Petro Dyminsky
- Manager: (Ukraine) Volodymyr Bezubyak
- Stadium: Ukraina Stadium and Arena Lviv, Lviv
- Premier League: 7th
- Ukrainian Cup: Round of 32
- Top goalscorer: League: Artur Karnoza (4); All: Artur Karnoza (4)
- Highest home attendance: 14,656 vs Dynamo; 11 March 2016
- Lowest home attendance: 1,000 vs Vorskla; 18 October 2015

The 2015–16 FC Karpaty Lviv season was the 53rd season in club history.

== Review and events ==
On 17 June 2015 FC Karpaty gathered at club's base for medical inspection after vacations. On 23 June 2015 Karpaty went for two week long pre-season training camp in Slovenia with six friendly matches planned.

== Competitions ==
=== Friendly matches ===
==== Pre-season ====
25 June 2015 Friendly match	Red Star Belgrade (Serbia)	4–1	Karpaty Lviv	Krško, Slovenia
19:00 CEST (UTC+2)	Parker 20'; Orlandić 34'; Katai 37'; Jović 86'	Report	Plastun 25'	Stadium: Matija Gubec Stadium; Referee: Dejan Budić (Slovenia)

28 June 2015 Friendly match	Krško (Slovenia)	1–2	Karpaty Lviv	Krško, Slovenia
11:00 CEST (UTC+2)	Bučar 67'	Report	Hladkyi 30'; Mance 40'	Stadium: Matija Gubec Stadium

28 June 2015 Friendly match	Split (Croatia)	0–0	Karpaty Lviv	Krško, Slovenia
17:30 CEST (UTC+2)		Report		Stadium: Matija Gubec Stadium

3 July 2015 Friendly match	Voždovac (Serbia)	1–2	Karpaty Lviv	Čatež ob Savi, Slovenia
16:00 CEST (UTC+2)	Sikimić 25'	Report	Daushvili 10'; Hladkyi 75'	Stadium: Pitch of Terme Hotel

3 July 2015 Friendly match	Olimpija Ljubljana (Slovenia)	2–3	Karpaty Lviv	Krško, Slovenia
19:30 CEST (UTC+2)	Matić 8'; Šporar 17'	Report	Strashkevych 44'; Mance 77', 82'	Stadium: Matija Gubec Stadium

7 July 2015 Friendly match	Sarajevo (Bosnia and Herzegovina)	1–3	Karpaty Lviv	Krško, Slovenia
10:00 CEST (UTC+2)	Bekić 31'	Report	Karnoza 25'; Khudobyak 43'; Hutsulyak 82'	Stadium: Matija Gubec Stadium

8 July 2015 Friendly match	Hrvatski Dragovoljac (Croatia)	1–2	Karpaty Lviv	Čatež ob Savi, Slovenia
10:00 CEST (UTC+2)	Cetina 84' (pen.)	Report	Mance 36'; Serhiychuk 89' (pen.)	Stadium: Pitch of Terme Hotel

==== Mid-season ====
24 September 2015 Friendly match	Karpaty Lviv	5–1	FC Mykolaiv	Lviv
17:00 EEST (UTC+3)	Strashkevych; Kozhanov; Karnoza	Report	Ukrainets	Stadium: Ukraina Stadium

24 October 2015 Friendly match	Karpaty Lviv	2–0	FC Mykolaiv	Lviv
	Kozhanov; Klyots	Report		Stadium: Ukraina Stadium

==== Winter break ====
28 January 2016 Friendly match	Petrolul Ploiești (Romania)	3–1	Karpaty Lviv	Antalya, Turkey
17:00 EET (UTC+2)	Nepomuceno 54'; Marinescu 77'; Paolucci 85'	Report	Blanco Leschuk 6'	Stadium: Mardan Stadium

2 February 2016 Friendly match	Slovácko (Czech Republic)	1–2	Karpaty Lviv	Kundu, Turkey
17:00 EET (UTC+2)	Kerbr 30' (pen.)	Report	Holodyuk 11'; Ksyonz 73'

6 February 2016 Friendly match	Rudar Pljevlja (Montenegro)	2–2	Karpaty Lviv	Antalya, Turkey
17:00 EET (UTC+2)	Živković 55'; Knežević 65'	Report	Blanco Leschuk 10'; Karnoza 76'	Stadium: WOW Sport Center; Attendance: 100

13 February 2016 Friendly match	Dinamo Tbilisi (Georgia (country))	3–3	Karpaty Lviv	Kundu, Turkey
19:00 EET (UTC+2)	Kvilitaia 28', 45'; Lobjanidze 72'	Report	Blanco Leschuk 63'; Karnoza 80', 90'

17 February 2016 Friendly match	Kyzyl-Zhar (Kazakhstan)	0–5	Karpaty Lviv	Kundu, Turkey
11:00 EET (UTC+2)		Report	Kozhanov 14'; Hutsulyak 27'; Zaviyskyi 32', 45'; Ndoye 81' (o.g.)

17 February 2016 Friendly match	Nordsjælland (Denmark)	2–3	Karpaty Lviv	Belek, Turkey
17:00 EET (UTC+2)	Kostevych 70' (o.g.); Marcondes 75'	Report	Miroshnichenko 50'; Karnoza 52' (pen.); Blanco Leschuk 66'

20 February 2016 Friendly match	Shakhter Karagandy (Kazakhstan)	1–1	Karpaty Lviv	Kundu, Turkey
17:00 EET (UTC+2)	Nurybekov 3'	Report	Kravets 40'

21 February 2016 Friendly match	Astana (Kazakhstan)	1–1	Karpaty Lviv	Antalya, Turkey
15:00 EET (UTC+2)	Despotović 14'	Report	Kadymyan 31'	Stadium: Mardan Stadium; Referee: ? (Moldova)

24 February 2016 Friendly match	Okzhetpes (Kazakhstan)	1–2	Karpaty Lviv	Kundu, Turkey
17:00 EET (UTC+2)	Buleshev 71' (pen.)	Report	Kadymyan 13' (pen.), 30'	Referee: ? (Moldova)

29 February 2016 Friendly match	FC Ternopil	1–4	Karpaty Lviv	Ternopil
14:00 EET (UTC+2)	Shevchuk 3'	Report	Kadymyan 21', 27'; Blanco Leschuk 61'; Kozhanov 88' (pen.)	Stadium: Ternopil City Stadium; Attendance: 2,900

==== Mid-season 2 ====
25 March 2016 Friendly match	Górnik Łęczna (Poland)	1–0	Karpaty Lviv	Łęczna, Poland
14:00 CET (UTC+1)	Pruchnik 45'	Report		Stadium: Stadion Górnik

=== Premier League ===
==== League table ====
Pos	Team	Pld	W	D	L	GF	GA	GD	Pts	Qualification or relegation
5	Vorskla Poltava	26	11	9	6	32	26	+6	42	Qualification to Europa League third qualifying round
6	FC Oleksandriya	26	10	8	8	30	29	+1	38	Qualification to Europa League third qualifying round
7	Karpaty Lviv	26	8	6	12	26	37	−11	30	
8	Stal Dniprodzerzhynsk	26	7	8	11	22	31	−9	29	
9	Olimpik Donetsk	26	6	7	13	22	35	−13	25	

Source: uafootball.net.ua
Rules for classification: 1) Points; 2) Goal difference; 3) Goals scored; 4) Head-to-head points; 5) Head-to-head goal difference; 6) Head-to-head goals scored; 7) Fairplay ranking; 8) Draw.

==== Results summary ====
Overall								Home						Away					
Pld	W	D	L	GF	GA	GD	Pts	W	D	L	GF	GA	GD	W	D	L	GF	GA	GD
25	7	6	12	26	37	−11	27	5	3	5	20	15	+5	2	3	7	6	22	−16

==== Matches ====
18 July 2015 1	Metalist Kharkiv	2–0	Karpaty Lviv	Kharkiv
17:00 EEST (UTC+3)	Pryyomov 45+2' (pen.), 76'	Report		Stadium: Metalist Stadium; Attendance: 5,160; Referee: Oleksandr Derdo

25 July 2015 2	Karpaty Lviv	1–0	Stal Dniprodzerzhynsk	Lviv
17:00 EEST (UTC+3)	Karnoza 87' (pen.)	Report		Stadium: Ukraina Stadium; Attendance: 4,226; Referee: Oleksandr Ivanov

1 August 2015 3	Olimpik Donetsk	0–1	Karpaty Lviv	Kyiv
17:00 EEST (UTC+3)		Report	Kozhanov 20'	Stadium: Bannikov Stadium; Attendance: 800; Referee: Oleksandr Holovkov

8 August 2015 4	Karpaty Lviv	4–0	Chornomorets Odesa	Lviv
19:30 EEST (UTC+3)	Karnoza 5'; Holodyuk 19'; Strashkevych 75'; Daushvili 90+2' (pen.)	Report		Stadium: Ukraina Stadium; Attendance: 6,200; Referee: Serhiy Berezka

15 August 2015 5	Dynamo Kyiv	3–0	Karpaty Lviv	Kyiv
19:30 EEST (UTC+3)	Veloso 22'; Yarmolenko 53'; Moraes 72'	Report		Stadium: Olympic Stadium; Attendance: 17,476; Referee: Yuriy Vaks

30 August 2015 6	Dnipro Dnipropetrovsk	2–0	Karpaty Lviv	Dnipropetrovsk
19:30 EEST (UTC+3)	Seleznyov 81', 88'	Report		Stadium: Dnipro Arena; Attendance: 12,169; Referee: Anatoliy Abdula

13 September 2015 7	Karpaty Lviv	1–1	Zorya Luhansk	Lviv
19:30 EEST (UTC+3)	Khudobyak 67'	Report	Karavayev 12'	Stadium: Ukraina Stadium; Attendance: 7,328; Referee: Anatoliy Zhabchenko

20 September 2015 8	FC Oleksandriya	4–1	Karpaty Lviv	Oleksandriya
17:00 EEST (UTC+3)	Ponomar 19', 54'; Hrytsuk 52'; Banada 73'	Report	Strashkevych 64'	Stadium: Nika Stadium; Attendance: 3,488; Referee: Vitaliy Romanov

27 September 2015 9	Karpaty Lviv	0–2	Volyn Lutsk	Lviv
19:30 EEST (UTC+3)		Report	Kravchenko 27'; Hitchenko 79' (o.g.)	Stadium: Ukraina Stadium; Attendance: 4,848; Referee: Yuriy Moseychuk

4 October 2015 10	Hoverla Uzhhorod	0–2	Karpaty Lviv	Uzhhorod
14:00 EEST (UTC+3)		Report	Savchenko 4' (o.g.); Plastun 40'	Stadium: Avanhard Stadium; Attendance: 2,706; Referee: Oleksandr Ivanov

18 October 2015 11	Karpaty Lviv	1–3	Vorskla Poltava	Lviv
19:30 EEST (UTC+3)	Tursunov 4' (o.g.)	Report	Barannik 38', 49'; A.Tkachuk 72'	Stadium: Ukraina Stadium; Attendance: 1,000; Referee: Oleksandr Derdo

31 October 2015 13	Karpaty Lviv	1–0	Metalurh Zaporizhya	Lviv
19:30 EET (UTC+2)	Kostevych 41'	Report		Stadium: Ukraina Stadium; Attendance: 2,362; Referee: Ivan Bondar

7 November 2015 14	Karpaty Lviv	1–1	Metalist Kharkiv	Lviv
17:00 EET (UTC+2)	Holodyuk 56'	Report	Pryyomov 41'	Stadium: Ukraina Stadium; Attendance: 3,820; Referee: Vitaliy Romanov

22 November 2015 15	Stal Dniprodzerzhynsk	1–1	Karpaty Lviv	Dnipropetrovsk
17:00 EET (UTC+2)	Adamyuk 25'	Report	Hutsulyak 57'	Stadium: Meteor Stadium; Attendance: 900; Referee: Yevhen Aranovskyi

28 November 2015 16	Karpaty Lviv	4–1	Olimpik Donetsk	Lviv
14:00 EET (UTC+2)	Kozhanov 15' (pen.); Chachua 20'; Khudobyak 76'; Klyots 90'	Report	Matyazh 27'	Stadium: Ukraina Stadium; Attendance: 1,870; Referee: Oleksandr Derdo

3 December 2015 12	Shakhtar Donetsk	3–0	Karpaty Lviv	Odesa
17:00 EET (UTC+2)	Eduardo 56'; Ismaily 85'; Teixeira 88'	Report		Stadium: Chornomorets Stadium; Attendance: 2,837; Referee: Serhiy Berezka

5 March 2016 17	Chornomorets Odesa	0–0	Karpaty Lviv	Odesa
14:00 EET (UTC+2)		Report		Stadium: Chornomorets Stadium; Attendance: 7,022; Referee: Ivan Bondar

11 March 2016 18	Karpaty Lviv	1–2	Dynamo Kyiv	Lviv
20:00 EET (UTC+2)	Chachua 27'	Report	Teodorczyk 55'; Yarmolenko 64'	Stadium: Arena Lviv; Attendance: 14,656; Referee: Kostyantyn Trukhanov

20 March 2016 19	Karpaty Lviv	0–1	Dnipro Dnipropetrovsk	Lviv
17:00 EET (UTC+2)		Report	Zozulya 62'	Stadium: Arena Lviv; Attendance: 8,451; Referee: Anatoliy Abdula

2 April 2016 20	Zorya Luhansk	4–1	Karpaty Lviv	Zaporizhya
17:00 EEST (UTC+3)	Ljubenović 5'; Budkivskyi 21'; Totovytskyi 43'; Chaykovskyi 61'	Report	Okechukwu 38'	Stadium: Slavutych-Arena; Attendance: 900; Referee: Yuriy Vaks

10 April 2016 21	Karpaty Lviv	2–2	FC Oleksandriya	Lviv
17:00 EEST (UTC+3)	Karnoza 73', 90+5'	Report	Ponomar 70'; Chorniy 75'	Stadium: Arena Lviv; Attendance: 3,556; Referee: Yevhen Aranovskyi

17 April 2016 22	Volyn Lutsk	0–0	Karpaty Lviv	Lutsk
14:00 EEST (UTC+3)		Report		Stadium: Avanhard Stadium; Attendance: 6,000; Referee: Serhiy Berezka

23 April 2016 23	Karpaty Lviv	3–0	Hoverla Uzhhorod	Lviv
14:00 EEST (UTC+3)	Miroshnichenko 36'; Hutsulyak 48'; Blanco Leschuk 75'	Report		Stadium: Arena Lviv; Attendance: 2,128; Referee: Kateryna Monzul'

30 April 2016 24	Vorskla Poltava	3–0	Karpaty Lviv	Poltava
17:00 EEST (UTC+3)	Sklyar 37'; Khlyobas 67'; Kolomoyets 86'	Report		Stadium: Butovskyi Vorskla Stadium; Attendance: 2,500; Referee: Kostyantyn Trukhanov

8 May 2016 25	Karpaty Lviv	1–2	Shakhtar Donetsk	Lviv
19:30 EEST (UTC+3)	Blanco Leschuk 36'	Report	Hitchenko 64' (o.g.); Marlos 88' (pen.)	Stadium: Arena Lviv; Referee: Mykola Balakin

15 May 2016 26	Metalurh Zaporizhya	^{[a]}	Karpaty Lviv	Zaporizhya
				Stadium: Slavutych-Arena

- ^{a} Metalurh Zaporizhya was expelled from the competition during the season. Victory awarded to Karpaty Lviv

=== Ukrainian Cup ===
22 August 2015 Round of 32	Zirka Kirovohrad	1–1 (5–4 p)	Karpaty Lviv	Kirovohrad
16:00 EEST (UTC+3)	Zahalskyi 70' (pen.)	Report	Chachua 50'	Stadium: Zirka Stadium; Attendance: 5,200; Referee: Mykhaylo Mytrovskyi
	Penalties
	Kovalyov (penalty scored); Dopilka (penalty scored); Kucherenko (penalty scored); Kavatsiv (penalty scored); Loktionov (penalty scored)		(penalty scored) Karnoza; (penalty scored) Holodyuk; (penalty scored) Khudobyak; (penalty scored) Kravets; (penalty missed) Daushvili

== Squad information ==
=== Squad and statistics ===
==== Squad, appearances and goals ====
As of 8 May 2016

No.	Pos	Nat	Player	Total		Premier League		Ukrainian Cup	
No.	Pos	Nat	Player	Apps	Goals	Apps	Goals	Apps	Goals
1	GK	(Ukraine) UKR	Roman Pidkivka	4	0	3	0	1	0
3	DF	(Ukraine) UKR	Vasyl Kravets	16	0	8+7	0	0+1	0
5	DF	(Ukraine) UKR	Andriy Hitchenko	21	0	19+1	0	1	0
7	MF	(Ukraine) UKR	Pavlo Ksyonz	19	0	16+2	0	1	0
8	DF	(Ukraine) UKR	Volodymyr Kostevych	25	1	23+1	1	1	0
9	MF	(Ukraine) UKR	Denys Kozhanov	18	2	14+3	2	1	0
10	MF	(Ukraine) UKR	Artur Karnoza	21	4	13+7	4	0+1	0
11	MF	(Ukraine) UKR	Ambrosiy Chachua	17	3	10+6	2	1	1
16	MF	(Ukraine) UKR	Ihor Khudobyak	24	2	22+1	2	1	0
17	MF	(Ukraine) UKR	Oleh Holodyuk	24	2	23	2	1	0
18	MF	(Ukraine) UKR	Dmytro Klyots	18	1	6+12	1	0	0
21	DF	(Ukraine) UKR	Yevhen Neplyakh	1	0	1	0	0	0
23	GK	(Ukraine) UKR	Roman Mysak	22	0	22	0	0	0
26	DF	(Ukraine) UKR	Artur Novotryasov	13	0	10+3	0	0	0
27	MF	(Ukraine) UKR	Vadym Strashkevych	12	2	3+8	2	0+1	0
29	FW	(Argentina) ARG	Gustavo Blanco Leschuk	9	2	9	2	0	0
32	DF	(Ukraine) UKR	Ihor Plastun (C)	26	1	25	1	1	0
77	MF	(Georgia (country)) GEO	Murtaz Daushvili	19	1	12+6	1	1	0
79	DF	(Ukraine) UKR	Andriy Markovych	2	0	2	0	0	0
92	FW	(Armenia) ARM	Heham Kadymyan	8	0	8	0	0	0
94	DF	(Ukraine) UKR	Denys Miroshnichenko	24	1	22+1	1	1	0
97	FW	(Ukraine) UKR	Oleksiy Hutsulyak	15	2	3+12	2	0	0
98	FW	(Nigeria) NGR	Gabriel Okechukwu	4	1	1+3	1	0	0
Players featured for Karpaty but left before the end of the season:
35	FW	(Ukraine) UKR	Maryan Shved	2	0	0+2	0	0	0

==== Goalscorers ====
As of 8 May 2016

Place	Position	Nation	Number	Name	Premier League	Ukrainian Cup	Total
1	MF	(Ukraine)	10	Artur Karnoza	4	0	4
2	MF	(Ukraine)	11	Ambrosiy Chachua	2	1	3
3	MF	(Ukraine)	27	Vadym Strashkevych	2	0	2
3	MF	(Ukraine)	17	Oleh Holodyuk	2	0	2
3	MF	(Ukraine)	9	Denys Kozhanov	2	0	2
3	MF	(Ukraine)	16	Ihor Khudobyak	2	0	2
3	FW	(Ukraine)	97	Oleksiy Hutsulyak	2	0	2
3	FW	(Argentina)	29	Gustavo Blanco Leschuk	2	0	2
3				Own goal	2	0	2
10
10	MF	(Georgia (country))	77	Murtaz Daushvili	1	0	1
10	DF	(Ukraine)	32	Ihor Plastun	1	0	1
10	DF	(Ukraine)	8	Volodymyr Kostevych	1	0	1
10	MF	(Ukraine)	18	Dmytro Klyots	1	0	1
10	FW	(Nigeria)	98	Gabriel Okechukwu	1	0	1
10	DF	(Ukraine)	94	Denys Miroshnichenko	1	0	1
				TOTALS	26	1	27

==== Disciplinary record ====
As of 8 May 2016

Number	Nation	Position	Name	Total		Premier League		Ukrainian Cup	
Number	Nation	Position	Name	Yellow card	Red card	Yellow card	Red card	Yellow card	Red card
3	(Ukraine)	DF	Vasyl Kravets	4	0	4	0	0	0
5	(Ukraine)	DF	Andriy Hitchenko	5	1	4	1	1	0
8	(Ukraine)	DF	Volodymyr Kostevych	4	0	3	0	1	0
9	(Ukraine)	MF	Denys Kozhanov	2	0	2	0	0	0
10	(Ukraine)	MF	Artur Karnoza	3	0	3	0	0	0
11	(Ukraine)	MF	Ambrosiy Chachua	4	0	4	0	0	0
16	(Ukraine)	MF	Ihor Khudobyak	3	1	2	1	1	0
17	(Ukraine)	MF	Oleh Holodyuk	5	0	5	0	0	0
19	(Ukraine)	MF	Pavlo Ksyonz	4	0	4	0	0	0
23	(Ukraine)	GK	Roman Mysak	2	0	2	0	0	0
26	(Ukraine)	DF	Artur Novotryasov	1	0	1	0	0	0
27	(Ukraine)	MF	Vadym Strashkevych	3	0	3	0	0	0
29	(Argentina)	FW	Gustavo Blanco Leschuk	2	0	2	0	0	0
32	(Ukraine)	DF	Ihor Plastun	4	0	4	0	0	0
77	(Georgia (country))	MF	Murtaz Daushvili	5	1	4	1	1	0
92	(Armenia)	FW	Heham Kadymyan	2	0	2	0	0	0
94	(Ukraine)	DF	Denys Miroshnichenko	7	1	6	1	1	0
97	(Ukraine)	FW	Oleksiy Hutsulyak	3	0	3	0	0	0
			TOTALS	63	4	58	4	5	0

=== Transfers ===
==== In ====
No.	Pos.	Nat.	Name	Age	Moving from	Type	Transfer Window	Contract ends	Transfer fee	Sources
9	MF	(Ukraine)	Denys Kozhanov	28	Shakhtar Donetsk	Loan	Summer	31 December 2015	—	
29	FW	(Argentina)	Gustavo Blanco Leschuk	24	(Sweden) Assyriska	End of contract	Winter	—	Free	
92	FW	(Armenia)	Heham Kadymyan	23	Olimpik Donetsk	End of contract	Winter	—	Free	
21	DF	(Ukraine)	Yevhen Neplyakh	23	(Greece) Platanias	End of contract	Winter	—	Free	
98	FW	(Nigeria)	Gabriel Okechukwu	20	—	Free Agent	Winter	—	Free	

==== Out ====
No.	Pos.	Nat	Name	Age	Moving to	Type	Transfer Window	Transfer fee	Sources
35	FW	(Ukraine)	Maryan Shved	18	(Spain) Sevilla Atlético	Transfer	Summer	€1 Million	
7	FW	(Ukraine)	Mykhaylo Serhiychuk	24	Hoverla Uzhhorod	Loan	Summer	—	

=== Managerial changes ===
Outgoing head coach	Manner of departure	Date of vacancy	Table	Incoming head coach	Date of appointment
(Croatia) Igor Jovićević	End of contract	31 December	8th	(Ukraine) Volodymyr Bezubyak	18 January
