= Oleksiy Hutsulyak =

Ukrainian footballer

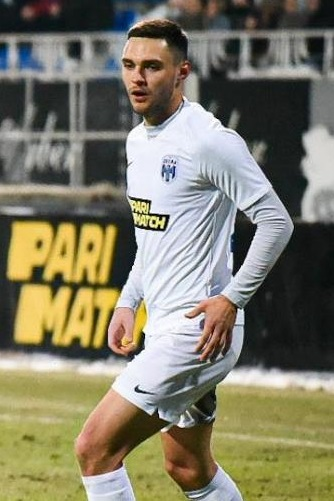
- Hutsulyak in 2021

Personal information
- Full name: Oleksiy Oleksandrovych Hutsulyak
- Date of birth: 25 December 1997 (age 28)
- Place of birth: Krasyliv, Ukraine
- Height: 1.84 m (6 ft 0 in)
- Position: Right midfielder

Team information
- Current team: Ordabasy Shymkent

Youth career
- 2010–2014: Karpaty Lviv

Senior career*
Years	Team	Apps	(Gls)
2015–2019	Karpaty Lviv	100	(12)
2016	→ Villarreal C (loan)	14	(5)
2020–2021	Desna Chernihiv	30	(2)
2021–2024	Dnipro-1	62	(20)
2024–2026	Polissya Zhytomyr	54	(19)
2026–	Ordabasy Shymkent	0	(0)

International career^{‡}
2012–2013	Ukraine U16	5	(0)
2013–2014	Ukraine U17	10	(4)
2015	Ukraine U18	3	(0)
2015–2016	Ukraine U19	8	(4)
2016–2018	Ukraine U21	9	(1)
2024–	Ukraine	16	(6)
- * Club domestic league appearances and goals as of 3 June 2026 ‡ National team caps and goals as of 31 March 2026

Oleksiy Oleksandrovych Hutsulyak (Ukrainian: Олексій Олександрович Гуцуляк; born 25 December 1997) is a Ukrainian professional footballer who plays as a left midfielder for Ordabasy Shymkent and the Ukraine national team.

== Club career ==
Hutsulyak is the product of the UFK Lviv School System. His first trainers were Taras Pavlish and Andriy Dulibskyi.

=== Karpaty Lviv ===
He made his debut for Karpaty Lviv against FC Metalurh Donetsk on 1 March 2015 in Ukrainian Premier League.

=== Desna Chernihiv ===
In 2020 he signed for with Desna Chernihiv in the Ukrainian Premier League, becoming the most expensive player bought by the club of Chernihiv. He helped them qualify for the quarterfinals of the 2019-20 Ukrainian Cup.

He was included in the match day lineup for Desna Chernihiv against VfL Wolfsburg in the 2020–21 Europa League third qualifying round at the AOK Stadion and made his first European competitive appearance as a second-half substitute. On 8 March 2021 he scored his first league goal for Desna Chernihiv against Rukh Lviv in a 4–0 away victory. On 10 April he scored his second league goal against Oleksandriya in a 4–1 victory.

=== Dnipro-1 ===
On 15 August 2021, he transferred to Dnipro-1 on a four-year contract for €500,000,

=== Polissya Zhytomyr ===
In June 2024 he signed a two-year contract with Polissya Zhytomyr for two years. In the first half of the 2024-25 season in 19 matches he scored 10 goals and 2 assists. He was named by fans the best player in Polissya that year. He took second place in a Komanda website survey to determine the best football player of 2024 in the Ukrainian championship.

=== Ordabasy Shymkent ===
In November 2026 Hutsulyak signed a contract with Ordabasy Shymkent.

== International career ==
Hutsulyak has represented Ukraine at every level from under-16 to under-21. In April 2022 he received his first call-up to the Ukraine national team but did not appear.

He made his debut on 21 March 2024 in a UEFA Euro 2024 qualifying play-offs game against Bosnia and Herzegovina.

== Career statistics ==
=== Club ===
As of match played 11 April 2023

Appearances and goals by club, season and competition
Club	Season	League			Cup		Continental		Other		Total	
Club	Season	Division	Apps	Goals	Apps	Goals	Apps	Goals	Apps	Goals	Apps	Goals
Karpaty Lviv	2014–15	Ukrainian Premier League	7	0	0	0	0	0	0	0	7	0
Karpaty Lviv	2015–16	Ukrainian Premier League	15	2	0	0	0	0	0	0	15	2
Karpaty Lviv	2016–17	Ukrainian Premier League	13	3	0	0	0	0	0	0	13	3
Karpaty Lviv	2017–18	Ukrainian Premier League	25	1	1	0	0	0	0	0	26	1
Karpaty Lviv	2018–19	Ukrainian Premier League	28	4	3	1	0	0	2	0	33	5
Karpaty Lviv	2019–20	Ukrainian Premier League	12	2	0	0	0	0	0	0	12	2
Karpaty Lviv	Total		100	12	4	1	0	0	2	0	106	13
Villarreal C (loan)	2016–17	Tercera División	14	5	0	0	0	0	0	0	14	5
Desna Chernihiv	2019–20	Ukrainian Premier League	4	0	0	0	0	0	0	0	4	0
Desna Chernihiv	2020–21	Ukrainian Premier League	24	2	2	0	1 (Note: Appearance(s) in UEFA Europa League)	0	0	0	27	2
Desna Chernihiv	2021–22	Ukrainian Premier League	2	0	0	0	0	0	0	0	2	0
Desna Chernihiv	Total		30	2	2	0	1	0	0	0	33	2
Dnipro-1	2021–22	Ukrainian Premier League	13	4	0	0	0	0	0	0	13	4
Dnipro-1	2022–23	Ukrainian Premier League	16	6	0	0	0	0	0	0	16	6
Dnipro-1	Total		29	10	0	0	0	0	0	0	29	10
Career total			174	29	6	1	1	0	2	0	181	30

=== International ===
As of match played 31 March 2026

National team	Year	Apps	Goals
Ukraine
Ukraine	2024	5	0
Ukraine	2025	9	5
Ukraine	2026	2	1
Total		16	6

Scores and results list Ukraine goal tally first, score column indicates score after each Hutsulyak goal

List of international goals scored by Oleksiy Hutsulyak
No.	Date	Venue	Opponent	Score	Result	Competition
1	20 March 2025	Estadio Nueva Condomina, Murcia, Spain	Belgium	1–1	3–1	2024–25 UEFA Nations League play-offs
2	10 June 2025	BMO Field, Toronto, Canada	New Zealand	1–0	2–1	2025 Canadian Shield
3	10 October 2025	Laugardalsvöllur, Reykjavík, Iceland	Iceland	2–1	5–3	2026 FIFA World Cup qualification
4	13 October 2025	Józef Piłsudski Cracovia Stadium, Kraków, Poland	Azerbaijan	1–0	2–1	2026 FIFA World Cup qualification
5	16 November 2025	Polish Army Stadium, Warsaw, Poland	Iceland	2–0	2–0	2026 FIFA World Cup qualification
6	31 March 2026	Ciudad de Valencia, Valencia, Spain	Albania	1–0	1–0	Friendly
