= Roman Mysak =

Ukrainian footballer (born 1991)

Personal information
- Full name: Roman Mykhaylovych Mysak
- Date of birth: 9 September 1991 (age 35)
- Place of birth: Lviv, Ukraine
- Height: 1.89 m (6 ft 2 in)
- Position: Goalkeeper

Team information
- Current team: Karpaty Lviv
- Number: 1

Youth career
- 2004–2008: Karpaty Lviv

Senior career*
Years	Team	Apps	(Gls)
2008–2018	Karpaty Lviv	62	(0)
2009	→ Karpaty-2 Lviv	18	(0)
2011–2012	→ Krymteplytsia Molodizhne (loan)	32	(0)
2018	Olimpik Donetsk	0	(0)
2018–2019	AGF Aarhus	0	(0)
2019–2021	Rukh Lviv	39	(0)
2021–2022	Desna Chernihiv	5	(0)
2023	Alashkert	3	(0)
2023	Dnipro-1	0	(0)
2023–2025	Kolos Kovalivka	1	(0)
2025–	Karpaty Lviv	7	(0)

International career^{‡}
2012	Ukraine U21	2	(0)
- * Club domestic league appearances and goals as of 21 November 2026 ‡ National team caps and goals as of 1 September 2023

Roman Mykhaylovych Mysak (Ukrainian: Роман Михайлович Мисак; born 9 September 1991) is a Ukrainian professional footballer who plays as a goalkeeper for Ukrainian Premier League club Karpaty Lviv.

== Career ==
Mysak is a product of Karpaty Lviv academy. His first coach was Andriy Hriner.

=== Karpaty Lviv ===
He made his debut for Karpaty Lviv as a second-half substitute against FC Zorya Luhansk on 6 October 2012 in the Ukrainian Premier League.

==== Loan to Krymteplytsia Molodizhne ====
In early 2011, he was loaned to FC Krymteplytsia Molodizhne in the Ukrainian First League, where he was the club's main goalkeeper for one and a half seasons.

=== AGF Aarhus ===
He moved to Danish Superliga club AGF Aarhus on 31 August 2018. He signed an initial contract for one year. He left the club in February 2019.

=== Rukh Lviv ===
From 2019 until 2021 he played for Rukh Lviv, appearing in 39 matches.

=== Desna Chernihiv ===
In August 2021 he moved to Ukrainian Premier League club Desna Chernihiv. On 12 September he made his debut with the club against Vorskla Poltava at the Oleksiy Butovsky Vorskla Stadium.

=== Ararat Yerevan ===
On 12 February 2023 Mysak moved to Alashkert.

=== Dnipro-1 ===
On 4 July 2023 Mysak joined Ukrainian Premier League club Dnipro-1. He signed a one-year contract and took the number 21 shirt.

=== Kolos Kovalivka ===
In 2023 he moved to Kolos Kovalivka. In July 2025 his contract with the club expired.

=== Karpaty Lviv ===
In July 2025, he moved to Karpaty Lviv. On 29 May 2026 he extended his contract with the club.

== Career statistics ==
=== Club ===
As of match played 21 November 2026

Appearances and goals by club, season and competition
Club	Season	League			Cup		Continental		Other		Total	
Club	Season	Division	Apps	Goals	Apps	Goals	Apps	Goals	Apps	Goals	Apps	Goals
Karpaty Lviv	2008–09	Ukrainian Premier League	0	0	0	0	0	0	0	0	0	0
Karpaty Lviv	2009–10	Ukrainian Premier League	0	0	0	0	0	0	0	0	0	0
Karpaty Lviv	2010–11	Ukrainian Premier League	0	0	0	0	0	0	0	0	0	0
Karpaty Lviv	2011–12	Ukrainian Premier League	0	0	0	0	0	0	0	0	0	0
Karpaty Lviv	2012–13	Ukrainian Premier League	10	0	0	0	0	0	0	0	10	0
Karpaty Lviv	2013–14	Ukrainian Premier League	0	0	0	0	0	0	0	0	0	0
Karpaty Lviv	2014–15	Ukrainian Premier League	20	0	3	0	0	0	0	0	23	0
Karpaty Lviv	2015–16	Ukrainian Premier League	22	0	0	0	0	0	0	0	22	0
Karpaty Lviv	2016–17	Ukrainian Premier League	4	0	1	0	0	0	0	0	5	0
Karpaty Lviv	2017–18	Ukrainian Premier League	6	0	1	0	0	0	0	0	7	0
Karpaty Lviv	Total		62	0	5	0	0	0	0	0	67	0
Krymteplytsia Molodizhne (loan)	2010–11	Ukrainian First League	11	0	0	0	0	0	0	0	11	0
Krymteplytsia Molodizhne (loan)	2011–12	Ukrainian First League	27	0	0	0	0	0	0	0	27	0
AGF Aarhus	2018–19	Danish Superliga	0	0	0	0	0	0	0	0	0	0
Rukh Lviv	2018–19	Ukrainian First League	9	0	0	0	0	0	0	0	9	0
Rukh Lviv	2019–20	Ukrainian First League	27	0	0	0	0	0	0	0	27	0
Rukh Lviv	2020–21	Ukrainian Premier League	3	0	1	0	0	0	0	0	4	0
Rukh Lviv	Total		39	0	1	0	0	0	0	0	40	0
Desna Chernihiv	2021–22	Ukrainian Premier League	5	0	1	0	0	0	0	0	6	0
Alashkert	2022–23	Armenian Premier League	3	0	0	0	0	0	0	0	3	0
Dnipro-1	2023–24	Ukrainian Premier League	0	0	0	0	0	0	0	0	0	0
Kolos Kovalivka	2023–24	Ukrainian Premier League	0	0	0	0	0	0	0	0	0	0
Kolos Kovalivka	2024–25	Ukrainian Premier League	1	0	1	0	0	0	0	0	0	2
Karpaty Lviv	2025–26	Ukrainian Premier League	0	0	0	0	0	0	0	0	0	0
Karpaty Lviv	2026–27	Ukrainian Premier League	7	0	2	0	0	0	0	0	9	0
Career total			155	0	109	0	0	0	0	0	165	0

== Gallery ==
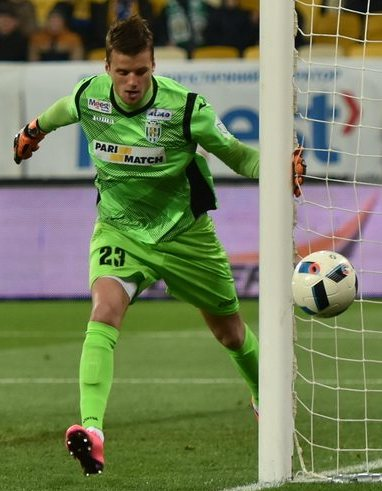
Roman Mysak with Karpaty Lviv
