= Maryan Shved =

Ukrainian footballer

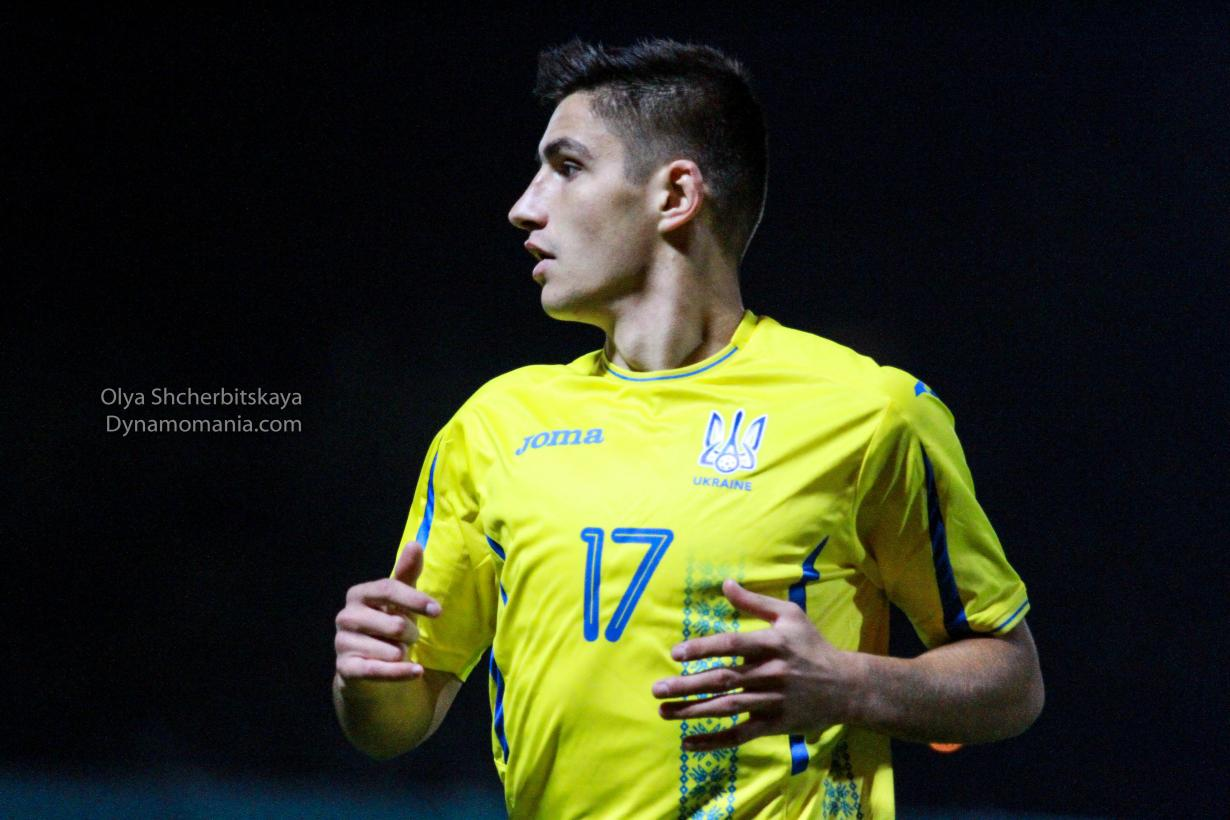

Personal information
- Full name: Maryan Vasylyovych Shved
- Date of birth: 16 July 1997 (age 29)
- Place of birth: Mykolaiv, Ukraine
- Height: 1.71 m (5 ft 7 in)
- Position: Right winger

Team information
- Current team: Shakhtar Donetsk
- Number: 9

Youth career
- 2004–2014: Karpaty Lviv
- 2015–2016: Sevilla

Senior career*
Years	Team	Apps	(Gls)
2014–2015	Karpaty Lviv	10	(2)
2015–2017	Sevilla Atlético	1	(0)
2017–2018	Karpaty Lviv	35	(14)
2019–2021	Celtic	1	(0)
2019	→ Karpaty Lviv (loan)	7	(6)
2020–2021	→ Mechelen (loan)	22	(4)
2021–2022	Mechelen	35	(2)
2022–	Shakhtar Donetsk	39	(7)

International career
2012	Ukraine U16	4	(1)
2015–2016	Ukraine U19	14	(5)
2016–2018	Ukraine U21	12	(2)
2018–2019	Ukraine	2	(0)
- * Club domestic league appearances and goals as of 21 May 2026

Maryan Vasylyovych Shved (Ukrainian: Мар'ян Васильович Швед; born 16 July 1997) is a Ukrainian professional footballer who plays as a right winger for Ukrainian Premier League club Shakhtar Donetsk.

== Club career ==
=== Karpaty Lviv ===
Born in Mykolaiv, Shved is a product of the Karpaty Lviv's youth system, where he joined at the age of seven.

Shved made his debut for Karpaty in a Ukrainian Premier League game against Metalurh Donetsk on 1 March 2015, playing the full 90 minutes of a 1–1 draw in Kyiv's Obolon Arena. On 26 April, he scored his first goals, one in each half of a 4–1 home win over Olimpik Donetsk.

=== Sevilla ===
On 5 August 2015, at just the age of 18, Shved signed a five-year contract with Spanish club Sevilla, but was sent to the reserve team Sevilla Atlético to develop. He turned down fellow Spaniards Valencia CF to sign for the Andalusians, also being attracted by the presence of compatriot Yevhen Konoplyanka in the team.

He played six games for the youth team in the season's UEFA Youth League, scoring the only goal of a win at Juventus in the group stage on 30 September 2015.

On 4 October 2015, Shved made his senior debut for Sevilla Atlético, replacing José Amo for the final eleven minutes of a 1–1 draw at UD Marbella.

=== Return to Karpaty Lviv ===
Shved returned to Karpaty Lviv in 2017.

In the 2018–19 season, he won the UPL Player of the Month awards for September 2018, November 2018 and March 2019. Shved finished the season with 15 goals and four assists in 26 appearances.

=== Celtic ===
In January 2019, he signed an 18-month contract with Scottish Premiership club Celtic but remained at Karpaty on loan for the remainder of the season. Shved scored on his Celtic debut in a 2–0 away win (Agg 7–0) over Nõmme Kalju FC in the second qualifying round of the 2019–20 UEFA Champions League coming on as a substitute and scoring in injury time with a powerful strike from the edge of the penalty area.

=== Mechelen ===
In July 2021, Shved joined Belgian First Division A club Mechelen on a permanent three-year deal having spent the previous season with the club on loan.

=== Shakhtar Donetsk ===
On 1 September 2022, Shved returned to his native Ukraine when he joined Shakhtar Donetsk on a five-year deal. On 6 September, he scored a brace on his Champions League debut in a 4–1 away win over RB Leipzig.

== International career ==
Shved played for Ukraine at under-16 level and has represented the country up to under-19. He made his debut for the senior squad on 20 November 2018 in a friendly against Turkey, as a 77th-minute substitute for Viktor Tsyhankov.

== Personal life ==
Shved is the oldest son of Vasyl Shved, who played as a forward.

== Career statistics ==
=== Club ===
As of match played 21 May 2026

Appearances and goals by club, season and competition
Club	Season	League			National cup (Note: Includes Ukrainian Cup, Scottish Cup, Belgian Cup)		Europe		Other		Total	
Club	Season	Division	Apps	Goals	Apps	Goals	Apps	Goals	Apps	Goals	Apps	Goals
Karpaty Lviv	2014–15	Ukrainian Premier League	10	2	0	0	—		0	0	10	2
Karpaty Lviv	2015–16	Ukrainian Premier League	2	0	0	0	—		0	0	2	0
Karpaty Lviv	Total		12	2	0	0	—		0	0	12	2
Sevilla Atlético	2015–16	Segunda División B	1	0	0	0	—		0	0	1	0
Sevilla Atlético	2016–17	Segunda División	0	0	0	0	—		0	0	0	0
Sevilla Atlético	Total		1	0	0	0	—		0	0	1	0
Karpaty Lviv	2017–18	Ukrainian Premier League	18	6	0	0	—		0	0	18	6
Karpaty Lviv	2018–19	Ukrainian Premier League	24	14	2	1	—		0	0	26	15
Karpaty Lviv	Total		42	20	2	1	—		0	0	44	21
Celtic	2019–20	Scottish Premiership	1	0	1	0	1 (Note: Appearances in UEFA Champions League)	1	0	0	3	1
Celtic	2020–21	Scottish Premiership	0	0	0	0	0	0	0	0	0	0
Celtic	Total		1	0	1	0	1	1	0	0	3	1
Mechelen (loan)	2020–21	Belgian First Division A	22	4	2	1	—		0	0	24	5
Mechelen	2021–22	Belgian First Division A	32	2	3	1	—		0	0	35	3
Mechelen	2022–23	Belgian First Division A	3	0	0	0	—		0	0	3	0
Mechelen	Total		35	2	3	1	—		0	0	38	3
Shakhtar Donetsk	2022–23	Ukrainian Premier League	10	2	0	0	4 (Note: Three appearances and two goals in UEFA Champions League, one appearance in UEFA Europa League)	2	0	0	14	4
Shakhtar Donetsk	2023–24	Ukrainian Premier League	13	3	2	0	3 (Note: Two appearances UEFA Champions League, one appearance in UEFA Europa League)	0	0	0	18	3
Shakhtar Donetsk	2024–25	Ukrainian Premier League	11	1	0	0	0	0	—		11	1
Shakhtar Donetsk	2025–26	Ukrainian Premier League	5	1	1	0	5 (Note: Three appearances in UEFA Europa League, two appearances in UEFA Conference League)	0	—		11	1
Shakhtar Donetsk	Total		39	7	3	0	12	2	0	0	54	9
Career total			152	35	11	3	13	3	0	0	176	41

=== International ===
As of match played 14 November 2019

Appearances and goals by national team and year
National team	Year	Apps	Goals
Ukraine	2018	1	0
Ukraine	2019	1	0
Total		2	0

== Honours ==
Shakhtar Donetsk

- Ukrainian Cup: 2024–25

Individual

- Ukrainian Premier League Player of the Month: September 2018, November 2018, March 2019
