= Adam Wolniewicz =

Polish footballer

Personal information
- Full name: Adam Wolniewicz
- Date of birth: 18 March 1993 (age 33)
- Place of birth: Ruda Śląska, Poland
- Height: 1.83 m (6 ft 0 in)
- Position: Right-back

Team information
- Current team: Odra Miasteczko Śląskie

Youth career
- Gwiazda Ruda Śląska
- MSPN Górnik Zabrze
- 2011–2013: Górnik Zabrze

Senior career*
Years	Team	Apps	(Gls)
2013–2019	Górnik Zabrze II	46	(3)
2013–2019	Górnik Zabrze	64	(1)
2013	→ ROW Rybnik (loan)	1	(0)
2014–2015	→ ROW Rybnik (loan)	18	(0)
2019	→ GKS Jastrzębie (loan)	11	(1)
2019–2021	GKS Jastrzębie	7	(2)
2021–2022	Cyklon Rogoźnik		
2022–2023	Śląsk Świętochłowice		
2023–	Odra Miasteczko Śląskie		
- * Club domestic league appearances and goals as of 10:38, 18 March 2024 (UTC)

Adam Wolniewicz (born 18 March 1993) is a Polish footballer who plays as a right-back for Odra Miasteczko Śląskie.

== Honours ==
ROW Rybnik

- II liga West: 2012–13
