= Dmytro Zayikyn =

Ukrainian footballer

Personal information
- Full name: Dmytro Stanislavovych Zayikyn
- Date of birth: 6 April 1997 (age 29)
- Place of birth: Kyiv, Ukraine
- Height: 1.85 m (6 ft 1 in)
- Position: Striker

Youth career
- 2003–2014: Dynamo Kyiv

Senior career*
| Years | Team | Apps | (Gls) |
| 2014–2016 | Skala Stryi | 0 | (0) |
| 2016–2018 | Karpaty Lviv | 1 | (0) |
| 2018 | Veres Rivne | 8 | (0) |
| 2019 | Nyva Ternopil | 0 | (0) |

International career^{‡}
| 2012–2013 | Ukraine U16 | 5 | (0) |
- * Club domestic league appearances and goals as of 14 October 2021 ‡ National team caps and goals as of 31 January 2017

Dmytro Stanislavovych Zayikyn (Ukrainian: Дмитро Станіславович Заїкин; born 6 April 1997) is a Ukrainian professional football striker.

== Career ==
Zayikyn has been the product of the FC Dynamo Kyiv School System from the age of six. He played for FC Skala Stryi in the Ukrainian Second League. In July 2016 he signed a three-year contract with FC Karpaty. He made his debut for FC Karpaty as a substitute in the second half of a game against FC Dynamo Kyiv on 31 July 2016 in the Ukrainian Premier League.
