= Ihor Bohach =

Ukrainian footballer

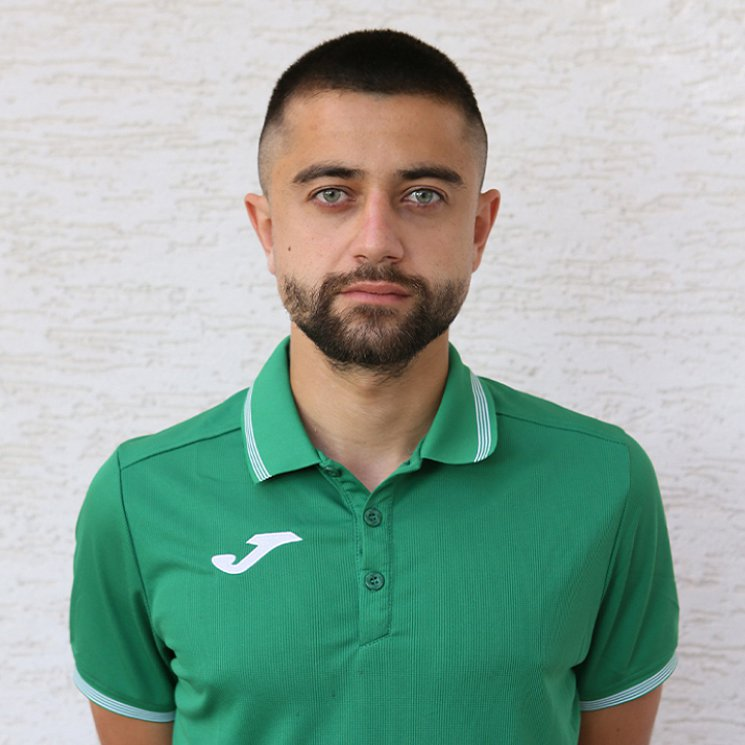

Personal information
- Full name: Ihor Volodymyrovych Bohach
- Date of birth: 3 May 1996 (age 30)
- Place of birth: Lviv, Ukraine
- Height: 1.68 m (5 ft 6 in)
- Position: Midfielder

Youth career
- 2009–2013: Karpaty Lviv

Senior career*
Years	Team	Apps	(Gls)
2013–2018	Karpaty Lviv	3	(0)
2018	Polissya Zhytomyr	4	(0)
2018–2019	Nyva Vinnytsia	16	(1)
2019–2020	Kalush	16	(0)
2020–2021	Yunist Hiyche	12	(2)
2021	Karpaty Lviv	9	(0)
2021	Karpaty Lviv	9	(0)
- * Club domestic league appearances and goals as of 23 December 2021

Ihor Volodymyrovych Bohach (Ukrainian: Ігор Володимирович Богач; born 3 May 1996) is a Ukrainian professional football midfielder.

== Career ==
Bohach is the product of the Karpaty Lviv School System and then played for FC Karpaty in the Ukrainian Premier League Reserves and Under 19 Championship during 3 seasons.

He made his debut for FC Karpaty as a substituted player in a game against FC Shakhtar Donetsk on 12 August 2016 in the Ukrainian Premier League.
