= Ivan Lobay =

Ukrainian footballer

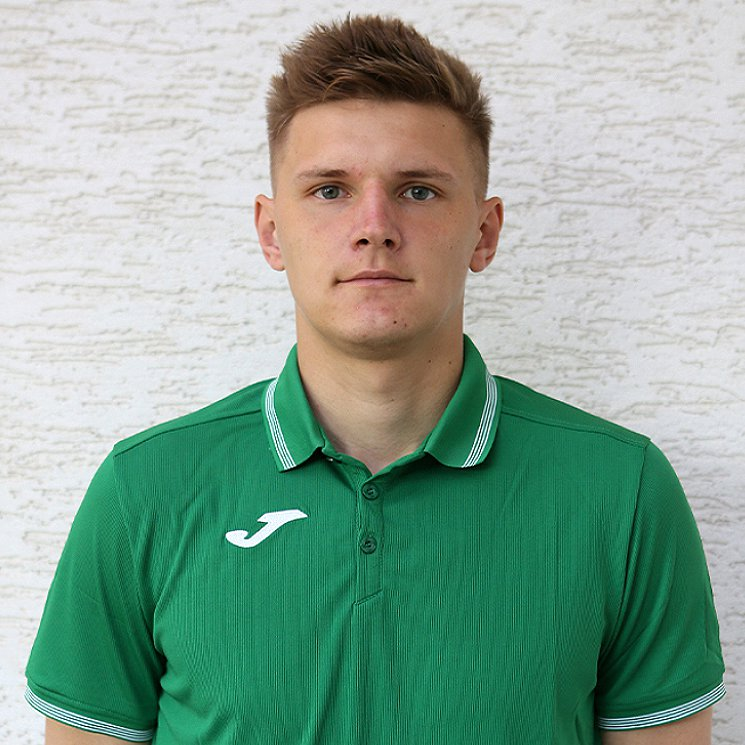

Personal information
- Full name: Ivan Volodymyrovych Lobay
- Date of birth: 21 May 1996 (age 30)
- Place of birth: Chervonohrad, Ukraine
- Height: 1.83 m (6 ft 0 in)
- Position: Defender

Team information
- Current team: FC Shakhtar Chervonohrad

Youth career
- 2009–2013: UFK Lviv

Senior career*
| Years | Team | Apps | (Gls) |
| 2013–2018 | Karpaty Lviv | 53 | (1) |
| 2018–2019 | Rukh Vynnyky | 16 | (0) |
| 2019–2020 | Nõmme Kalju | 26 | (3) |
| 2021 | Lviv | 5 | (0) |
| 2021–2022 | Karpaty Lviv | 16 | (0) |
| 2023– | FC Shakhtar Chervonohrad | | |

International career^{‡}
| 2011–2012 | Ukraine-16 | 4 | (0) |
| 2011–2012 | Ukraine-17 | 7 | (0) |
| 2013–2014 | Ukraine-18 | 4 | (0) |
| 2016 | Ukraine-20 | 2 | (0) |
| 2016–2017 | Ukraine-21 | 2 | (0) |
- * Club domestic league appearances and goals as of 27 November 2021 ‡ National team caps and goals as of 27 May 2021

Ivan Volodymyrovych Lobay (Ukrainian: Іван Володимирович Лобай; born 21 May 1996) is a professional Ukrainian football defender who plays for an amateur side FC Shakhtar Chervonohrad.

== Career ==
Lobay is the product of the UFK Lviv School System. He made his debut for FC Karpaty playing full-time in a match against FC Hoverla Uzhhorod on 27 July 2014 in the Ukrainian Premier League.

He also played for the Ukrainian under-17 national football team and was called up for other age level representations.
