= Murtaz Daushvili =

Georgian footballer

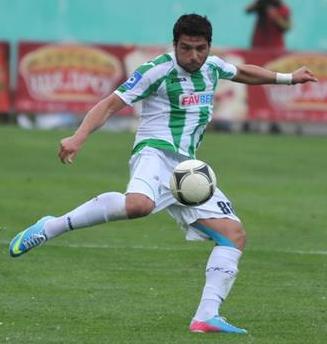
- Daushvili playing for FC Karpaty Lviv in 2013

Personal information
- Full name: Murtaz Daushvili
- Date of birth: 1 May 1989 (age 37)
- Place of birth: Tbilisi, Georgian SSR, Soviet Union
- Height: 1.77 m (5 ft 10 in)
- Position: Defensive midfielder

Youth career
- 2002–2004: Dinamo Tbilisi

Senior career*
Years	Team	Apps	(Gls)
2004–2005	Dinamo-2 Tbilisi	1	(0)
2005–2011	Zestaponi	99	(4)
2012	Lviv	0	(0)
2012	→ Karpaty Lviv (loan)	9	(0)
2012–2016	Karpaty Lviv	75	(1)
2016–2017	Diósgyőr	26	(0)
2018	Samtredia	12	(0)
2018–2019	Haladás	19	(0)
2019–2021	Anorthosis	52	(1)
2021–2023	APOEL	30	(0)

International career
2005–2006	Georgia U17	3	(0)
2006–2007	Georgia U19	2	(0)
2008–2010	Georgia U21	11	(0)
2008–	Georgia	41	(0)
- * Club domestic league appearances and goals as of 12 June 2023

Murtaz Daushvili (Georgian: მურთაზ დაუშვილი; born 1 May 1989) is a Georgian professional footballer who plays as a defensive midfielder for the Georgia national team.

Daushvili made his debut for Georgia on 19 November 2008 against Romania. As of January 2022, he plays for APOEL.
