= Vasyl Kravets =

Ukrainian footballer

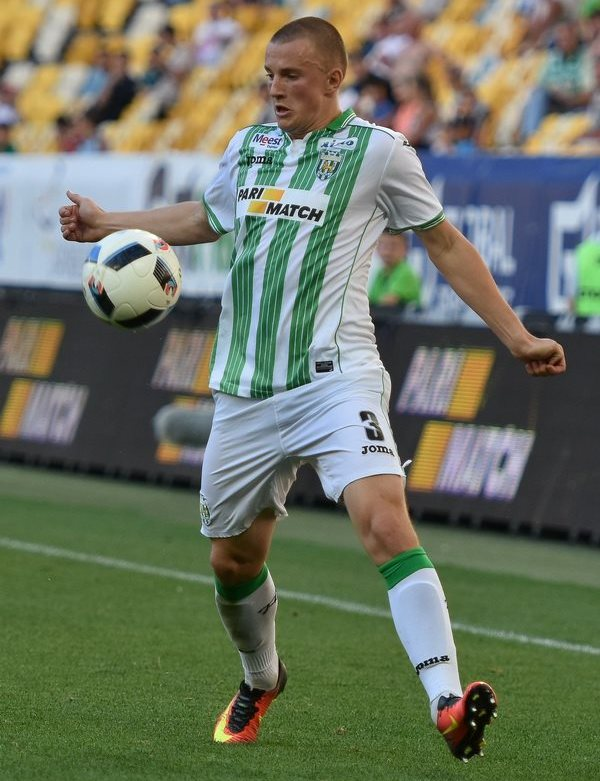
- Kravets in 2016

Personal information
- Full name: Vasyl Ruslanovych Kravets
- Date of birth: 20 August 1997 (age 29)
- Place of birth: Lviv, Ukraine
- Height: 1.85 m (6 ft 1 in)
- Position: Left-back

Team information
- Current team: Zorya Luhansk
- Number: 3

Youth career
- 2010–2014: Karpaty Lviv

Senior career*
Years	Team	Apps	(Gls)
2014–2017	Karpaty Lviv	32	(0)
2017	→ Lugo (loan)	8	(0)
2017–2019	Lugo	32	(0)
2019–2022	Leganés	8	(0)
2020	→ Lugo (loan)	16	(0)
2020–2021	→ Lech Poznań (loan)	18	(0)
2020	→ Lech Poznań II (loan)	1	(0)
2021–2022	→ Sporting Gijón (loan)	36	(1)
2022–2023	Vorskla Poltava	25	(3)
2023–2024	Dnipro-1	15	(0)
2024	Polissya Zhytomyr	6	(0)
2024–2026	Metalist 1925 Kharkiv	22	(1)
2026–	Zorya Luhansk	3	(0)

International career
2012–2013	Ukraine U16	13	(0)
2013–2014	Ukraine U17	8	(1)
2015	Ukraine U18	3	(0)
2015–2016	Ukraine U19	6	(0)
2016	Ukraine U20	2	(0)
2018	Ukraine U21	2	(0)
- * Club domestic league appearances and goals as of 17:48, 29 August 2026 (UTC)

Vasyl Ruslanovych Kravets (Ukrainian: Василь Русланович Кравець; born 20 August 1997) is a Ukrainian professional footballer who plays as a left-back for Ukrainian First League club Zorya Luhansk.

== Club career ==
Born in Lviv, Kravets is a product of the FC Karpaty Lviv School System. His first trainer was Vasyl Leskiv. He made his debut for FC Karpaty entering as a second-half substitute against FC Chornomorets Odesa on 10 May 2015 in Ukrainian Premier League.

On 24 January 2017, Kravets was loaned to Spanish Segunda División side CD Lugo until the end of the season, with a buyout clause. 12 June, Lugo announced that buyout option was activated.

On 13 January 2019, Kravets agreed to a four-and-a-half-year contract with La Liga side CD Leganés. He made his debut in the competition on 24 February, starting in a 1–1 home draw against Valencia CF.

On 15 January 2020, after appearing in only one cup match for Lega during the campaign, Kravets was loaned to his former side Lugo until June.

On 11 September 2020, Kravets moved to Lech Poznań on a season-long loan. The following 13 July, he moved to Sporting de Gijón also on a temporary basis.

On 1 September 2022, Kravets was transferred to FC Vorskla Poltava in his home country.

On 10 July 2023, Kravets was transferred to Dnipro-1.

On 9 March 2024, Kravets was transferred to Polissya Zhytomyr

== International career ==
Kravets was a youth international for Ukraine.

== Career statistics ==
As of 16 June 2021

Appearances and goals by club, season and competition
Club	Season	League			National cup (Note: Includes Ukrainian Cup, Copa del Rey, Polish Cup)		Continental		Other		Total	
Club	Season	Division	Apps	Goals	Apps	Goals	Apps	Goals	Apps	Goals	Apps	Goals
Karpaty Lviv	2014–15	Ukrainian Premier League	2	0	—		—		—		2	0
Karpaty Lviv	2015–16	Ukrainian Premier League	15	0	1	0	—		—		16	0
Karpaty Lviv	2016–17	Ukrainian Premier League	15	0	2	0	—		—		17	0
Karpaty Lviv	Total		32	0	3	0	—		—		35	0
Lugo (loan)	2016–17	Segunda División	8	0	—		—		—		8	0
Lugo	2017–18	Segunda División	17	0	1	0	—		—		18	0
Lugo	2018–19	Segunda División	15	0	1	0	—		—		16	0
Lugo	Total		32	0	2	0	—		—		34	0
Leganés	2018–19	La Liga	6	0	1	0	—		—		7	0
Leganés	2019–20	La Liga	0	0	1	0	—		—		1	0
Leganés	Total		6	0	2	0	—		—		8	0
Lugo (loan)	2019–20	Segunda División	15	0	—		—		—		15	0
Lech Poznań (loan)	2020–21	Ekstraklasa	18	0	2	0	6 (Note: Appearances in UEFA Europa League)	0	—		26	0
Lech Poznań II (loan)	2020–21	II liga	1	0	0	0	—		—		1	0
Career total			112	0	9	0	6	0	0	0	127	0
