= Artur Novotryasov =

Ukrainian footballer

Personal information
- Full name: Artur Mykolayovych Novotryasov
- Date of birth: 19 July 1992 (age 34)
- Place of birth: Yevpatoria, Ukraine
- Height: 1.81 m (5 ft 11 in)
- Position: Centre-back

Team information
- Current team: Viktoriya Sumy
- Number: 16

Youth career
- 2005–2009: UOR Simferopol

Senior career*
Years	Team	Apps	(Gls)
2009–2012	Krymteplytsia Molodizhne	62	(3)
2009–2010	→ Spartak Molodizhne	17	(8)
2012–2014	Tavriya Simferopol	0	(0)
2013	→ Bukovyna Chernivtsi (loan)	28	(3)
2014–2016	Karpaty Lviv	27	(0)
2017	Mariupol	9	(0)
2017	Chornomorets Odesa	5	(0)
2017–2018	Inhulets Petrove	24	(0)
2017–2018	→ Inhulets-2 Petrove	3	(0)
2019–2021	Krymteplytsia Molodizhne	51	(3)
2021	Kyran	20	(4)
2021	→ Kyran J	2	(0)
2022–2024	Bukovyna Chernivtsi	41	(3)
2024–	Viktoriya Sumy	40	(1)

International career^{‡}
2011	Ukraine U19	1	(0)
- * Club domestic league appearances and goals as of 4 June 2026 ‡ National team caps and goals as of 11 September 2017

Artur Mykolayovych Novotryasov (Ukrainian: Артур Миколайович Новотрясов; born 19 July 1992) is a Ukrainian professional footballer who plays as a centre-back for Viktoriya Sumy.

== Club career ==
=== Early years ===
Novotryasov is the product of the UOR Simferopol academy.

=== Tavriya Simferopol ===
In October 2012 he signed a 3-year deal with Tavriya Simferopol, but did not play, instead going on loan to Bukovyna Chernivtsi in the Ukrainian First League.

=== Karpaty Lviv ===
In January 2014 he signed a 4-year contract with Karpaty Lviv.

== International career ==
He also played for the Ukraine national under-19 football team and was called up for other youth levels.
