= Oleh Holodyuk =

Ukrainian footballer

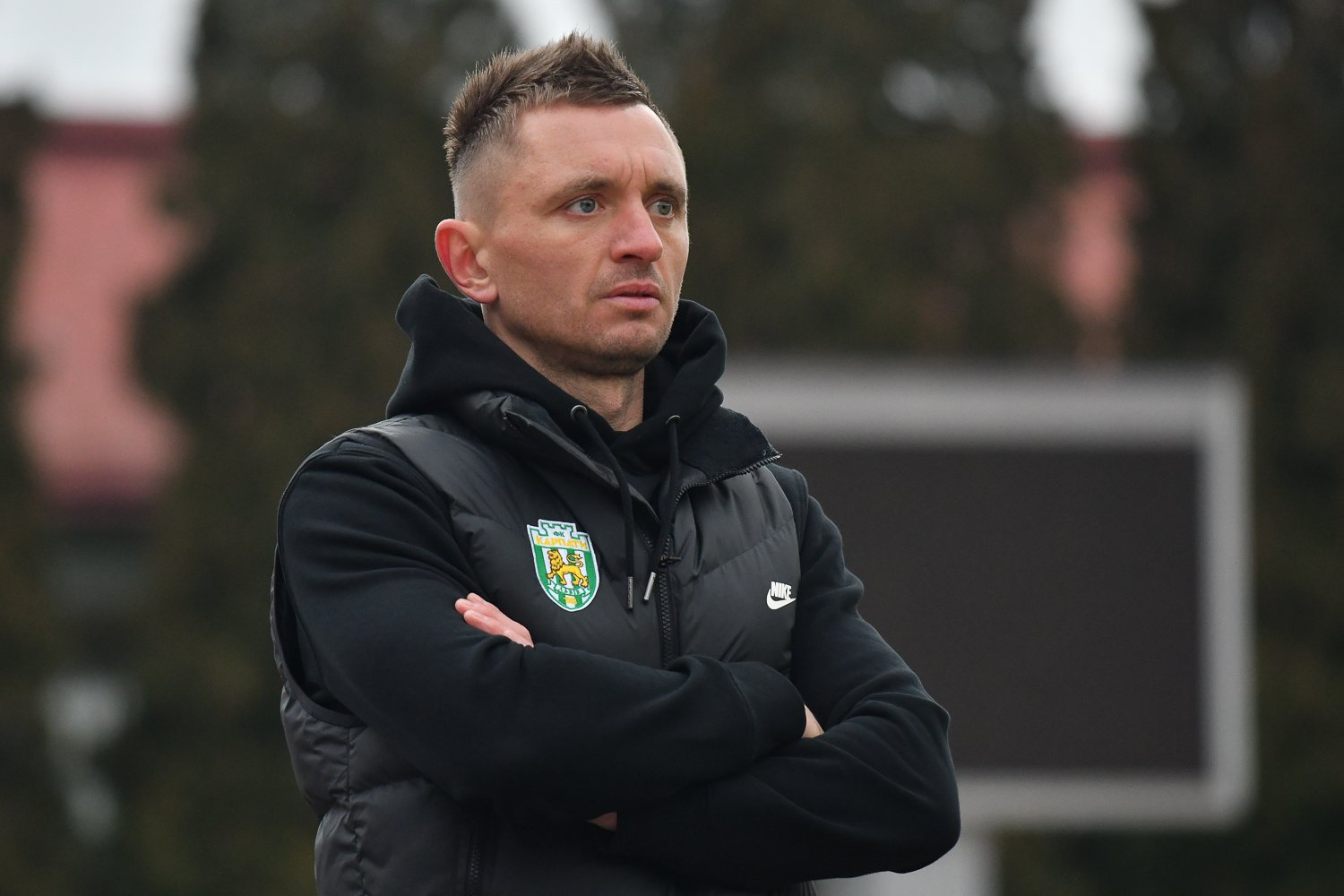

Personal information
- Full name: Oleh Yuriyovych Holodyuk
- Date of birth: 2 January 1988 (age 38)
- Place of birth: Sobishchytsi, Rivne Oblast, Soviet Union (now Ukraine)
- Height: 1.80 m (5 ft 11 in)
- Position: Midfielder

Team information
- Current team: Karpaty Lviv (U19 manager)

Youth career
- 1997–2002: Izotop Kuznetsovsk
- 2002–2005: UFK Lviv

Senior career*
Years	Team	Apps	(Gls)
2005–2016	Karpaty Lviv	170	(14)
2006–2008	→ Karpaty-2 Lviv	36	(4)
2016	Vorskla Poltava	7	(0)
2017–2018	Karpaty Lviv	31	(1)
2019	Haladás	10	(1)
2019	Zalaegerszeg	5	(0)
2020	Mynai	16	(0)
2021–2022	Metalist 1925 Kharkiv	25	(4)
Total		300	(24)

International career^{‡}
2006–2008	Ukraine U19	4	(0)
2008–2011	Ukraine U21	16	(2)

Managerial career
- 2022–2023: Metalist 1925 Kharkiv (assistant)
- 2023: Metalist 1925 Kharkiv (caretaker)
- 2024: Karpaty Lviv (U19 assistant)
- 2024–: Karpaty Lviv (U19)
- 2025: Ukraine U16
- * Club domestic league appearances and goals as of 12 January 2022 ‡ National team caps and goals as of 21 June 2018

Oleh Yuriyovych Holodyuk (Ukrainian: Олег Юрійович Голодюк; born 2 January 1988) is a Ukrainian former professional footballer who played as a midfielder and manager who currently manages the under-19 squad of Karpaty Lviv.

== Career ==
He is the product of the Karpaty Lviv Youth School System. He played for Ukrainian Premier League club FC Karpaty Lviv.
