= Ambrosiy Chachua =

Ukrainian footballer (born 1994)

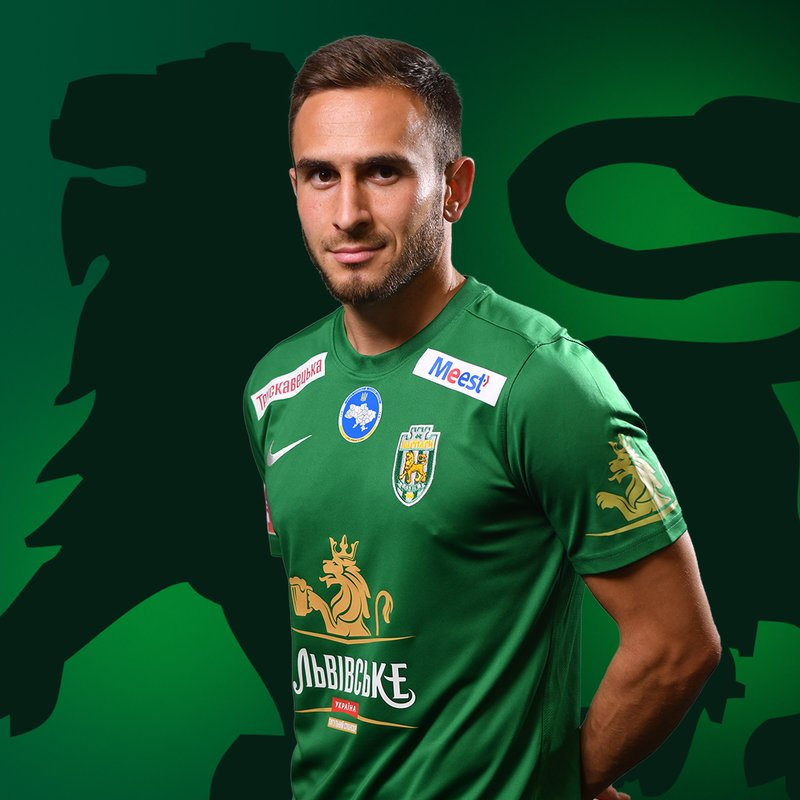

Personal information
- Full name: Ambrosiy Anzorovych Chachua
- Date of birth: 2 April 1994 (age 32)
- Place of birth: Rivne, Ukraine
- Height: 1.68 m (5 ft 6 in)
- Position: Attacking midfielder

Team information
- Current team: Karpaty Lviv
- Number: 8

Youth career
- 2007–2009: Veres Rivne
- 2009–2011: UFK Lviv

Senior career*
Years	Team	Apps	(Gls)
2011–2018	Karpaty Lviv	92	(7)
2018–2019	Akzhayik	11	(0)
2019	Torpedo Kutaisi	9	(0)
2019–2021	Volyn Lutsk	47	(2)
2021–	Karpaty Lviv	125	(26)

International career
2012	Ukraine U18	9	(0)
2012–2013	Ukraine U19	8	(0)
2014–2016	Ukraine U20	4	(0)
2015–2016	Ukraine U21	6	(0)
- * Club domestic league appearances and goals as of 3 June 2026

Ambrosiy Anzorovych Chachua (Ukrainian: Амбросій Анзорович Чачуа; born 2 April 1994) is a Ukrainian professional footballer who plays as an attacking midfielder for Karpaty Lviv.

== Career ==
Chachua is a product of FC Veres Rivne and of the UFK Lviv School Systems. His first trainer was Yaroslav Dmytrasevych. He made his debut for FC Karpaty entering in the second time in the match against FC Chornomorets Odesa on 3 November 2013 in the Ukrainian Premier League.

He also played for the Ukrainian under-18 national football team and was called up for other age level representations.

== Honours ==
Torpedo Kutaisi

- Georgian Super Cup: 2019
