= Ihor Plastun =

Ukrainian footballer

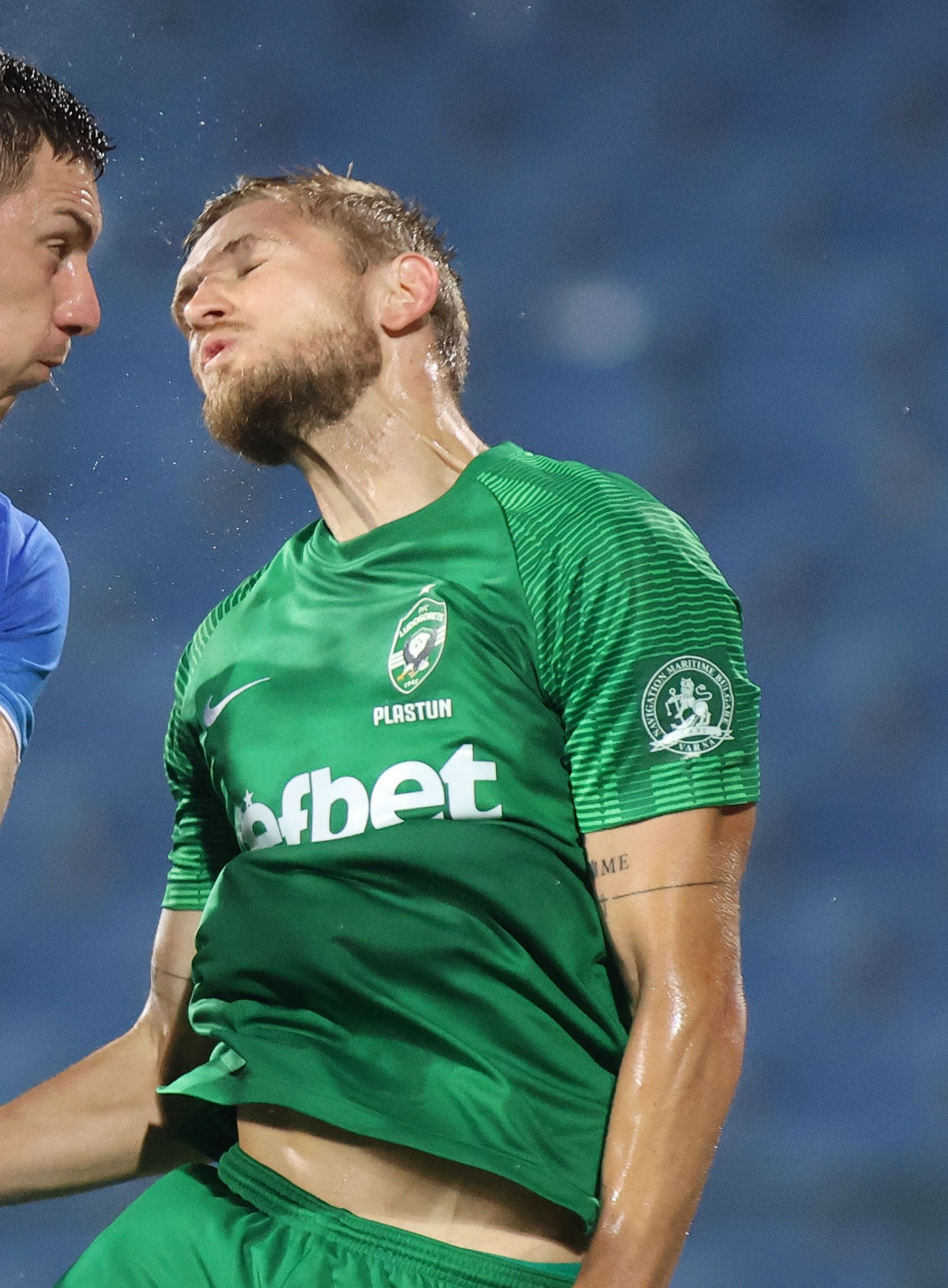
- Plastun with Ludogorets Razgrad in 2022

Personal information
- Full name: Ihor Volodymyrovych Plastun
- Date of birth: 20 August 1990 (age 36)
- Place of birth: Kyiv, Ukrainian SSR, Soviet Union
- Height: 1.93 m (6 ft 4 in)
- Position: Centre back

Team information
- Current team: Eupen
- Number: 32

Youth career
- 1997–2006: Obolon Kyiv

Senior career*
Years	Team	Apps	(Gls)
2007–2012	Obolon Kyiv	67	(4)
2007–2008	Obolon-2 Kyiv	33	(0)
2012–2016	Karpaty Lviv	93	(4)
2016–2018	Ludogorets Razgrad	50	(4)
2018–2021	Gent	61	(4)
2021–2024	Ludogorets Razgrad	53	(0)
2024	Ordabasy	23	(3)
2025–	Eupen	29	(0)

International career^{‡}
2010	Ukraine U20	2	(0)
2010–2012	Ukraine U21	13	(1)
2018–2019	Ukraine	4	(0)
- * Club domestic league appearances and goals as of 20 April 2026 ‡ National team caps and goals as of 14 October 2019

Ihor Volodymyrovych Plastun (Ukrainian: Ігор Володимирович Пластун; born 20 August 1990) is a Ukrainian professional footballer who plays as a defender for Challenger Pro League club Eupen.

== Club career ==
After progressing through the youth system at Obolon Kyiv, Plastun became a first team regular during 2010–11 season and made over 60 appearances for the club before signing for Karpaty Lviv in 2012.

On 10 June 2016, Plastun signed for Bulgarian club Ludogorets Razgrad for an undisclosed fee, believed to be €500,000.

On 12 June 2018, Plastun signed a four-year contract with Belgian club Gent.

In June 2021, he returned to Bulgarian club Ludogorets Razgrad, after spending three seasons with Gent. On 11 June 2021, Plastun joined the training camp, taking number 30, as his previous number 32 had already been taken by Josué Sá. In the summer of 2022 he was elected Bulgarian Footballer of the Year for the season 2021–22.

== International career ==
Plastun made his debut for Ukraine national football team on 16 November 2018 in a 2018–19 UEFA Nations League B game against Slovakia, as a 14th-minute substitute for Serhiy Kryvtsov, who had sustained an injury.

== Honours ==
Ludogorets Razgrad

- Bulgarian First League: (4) 2016–17, 2017–18, 2021–22, 2022–23
- Bulgarian Supercup: (2) 2021, 2022
- Bulgarian Cup: 2022–23

Individual

- Bulgarian Footballer of the Year: 2021–22
