= Vadym Strashkevych =

Ukrainian footballer

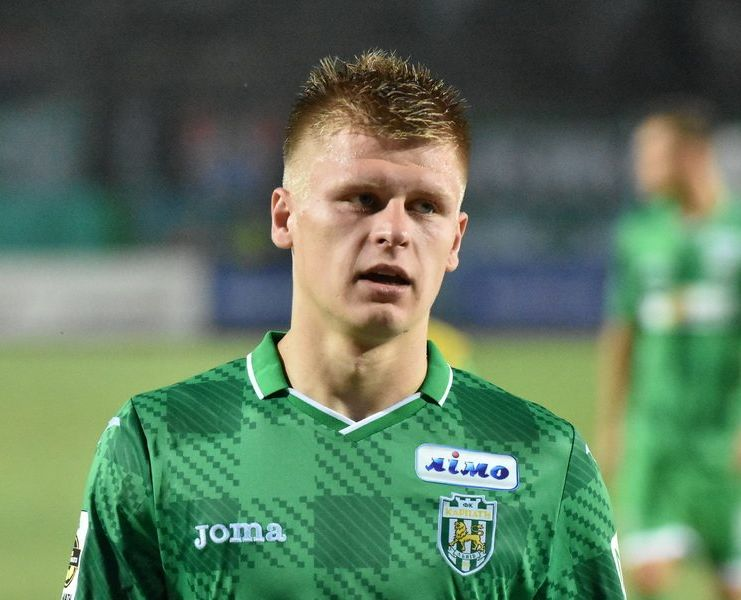
- Strashkevych in 2015

Personal information
- Full name: Vadym Vyacheslavovych Strashkevych
- Date of birth: 21 April 1994 (age 32)
- Place of birth: Kalynivka, Ukraine
- Height: 1.77 m (5 ft 10 in)
- Position: Attacking midfielder

Team information
- Current team: Kolos Polonne

Youth career
- 2006–2007: Nyva Vinnytsia
- 2007–2011: UFK Lviv

Senior career*
Years	Team	Apps	(Gls)
2011–2016	Karpaty Lviv	35	(4)
2017	Veres Rivne	3	(0)
2017	Poltava	10	(0)
2018	Volyn Lutsk	11	(1)
2018	Resovia Rzeszów	12	(2)
2019–2020	Mynai	23	(2)
2020	Monolit Kozyatyn	7	(3)
2020	Bukovyna Chernivtsi	9	(1)
2021	Karpaty Halych	12	(0)
2021–2022	Nyva Terebovlya	15	(1)
2022	Lyubomyr Stavyshche	0	(0)
2022–2024	Nyva Vinnytsia	35	(6)
2024–2025	Hirnyk-Sport Horishni Plavni	15	(5)
2025–	Kolos Polonne		

International career
2011	Ukraine U17	1	(0)
2014	Ukraine U20	1	(0)
- * Club domestic league appearances and goals

Vadym Vyacheslavovych Strashkevych (Ukrainian: Вадим В′ячеславович Страшкевич; born 21 April 1994) is a Ukrainian professional footballer who plays as a midfielder for Kolos Polonne.

== Career ==
Strashkevych is the product of the UFK Lviv School System. He made his debut for FC Karpaty entering as a second-half substitute against FC Illichivets Mariupol on 2 August 2013 in Ukrainian Premier League.

He also played for Ukrainian under-17 and Ukrainian under-20 national football teams.
