= Andriy Hitchenko =

Ukrainian footballer

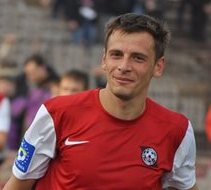

Personal information
- Full name: Andriy Ihorovych Hitchenko
- Date of birth: 2 October 1984 (age 42)
- Place of birth: Kyiv, Ukrainian SSR
- Height: 1.98 m (6 ft 6 in)
- Position: Defender

Senior career*
Years	Team	Apps	(Gls)
2003–2004	Arsenal-2 Kyiv	20	(0)
2005–2006	Arsenal Kyiv	0	(0)
2007	CSKA Kyiv	10	(0)
2007–2009	Oleksandriya	41	(3)
2010	Desna Chernihiv	16	(0)
2010–2012	Oleksandriya	52	(2)
2012–2013	Arsenal Kyiv	9	(0)
2013	Kryvbas Kryvyi Rih	11	(0)
2013–2016	Karpaty Lviv	55	(1)
2016–2018	Oleksandriya	51	(2)
2018–2021	Desna Chernihiv	75	(8)
2021–2023	Polissya Zhytomyr	39	(4)
- * Club domestic league appearances and goals as of 15 March 2024

Andriy Ihorovych Hitchenko (Ukrainian: Андрій Ігорович Гітченко; born 2 October 1984) is a former Ukrainian professional footballer who played as a defender.

== Clubs ==
=== Desna Chernihiv ===
In 2018 he moved to Desna Chernihiv. There, he helped his club qualify for the quarterfinals of the 2019–20 Ukrainian Cup.

On 12 July 2020 he scored against Shakhtar Donetsk, helping the club qualify for the 2020–21 UEFA Europa League for the first time in club history. On 24 September, Hitchenko was included in the team against VfL Wolfsburg for the Europa League third qualifying round after extending his contract by a year.

On 26 February 2021 he scored his first Ukrainian Premier League goal in a 3–0 victory over Inhulets Petrove.

=== Polissya Zhytomyr ===
After his contract with Desna expired, he moved to Polissya Zhytomyr in Ukrainian First League on 1 July 2021. On 7 August, he scored his first goal for his new club against Kremin.

== Coaching ==
On 20 September 2024, Hitchenko received his UEFA A coaching license.

== Career statistics ==
=== Club ===
As of match played 19 November 2022

Appearances and goals by club, season and competition
Club	Season	League			Cup		Europe		Other		Total	
Club	Season	Division	Apps	Goals	Apps	Goals	Apps	Goals	Apps	Goals	Apps	Goals
Arsenal Kyiv	2003–04	Ukrainian Premier League	0	0	0	0	0	0	0	0	0	0
Arsenal Kyiv	2004–05	Ukrainian Premier League	0	0	2	0	0	0	0	0	2	0
Arsenal Kyiv	2005–06	Ukrainian Premier League	0	0	0	0	0	0	0	0	0	0
Arsenal Kyiv	Total		0	0	2	0	0	0	0	0	2	0
CSKA Kyiv	2006–07	Ukrainian First League	10	0	0	0	0	0	0	0	10	0
Oleksandriya	2007–08	Ukrainian Premier League	25	1	2	0	0	0	0	0	27	1
Oleksandriya	2008–09	Ukrainian Premier League	16	0	1	0	0	0	0	0	17	0
Oleksandriya	Total		41	1	3	0	0	0	0	0	44	1
Desna Chernihiv	2009–10	Ukrainian First League	16	0	0	0	0	0	0	0	16	0
Oleksandriya	2010–11	Ukrainian First League	28	0	1	0	0	0	0	0	29	0
Oleksandriya	2011–12	Ukrainian Premier League	24	0	2	0	0	0	0	0	26	0
Oleksandriya	Total		52	0	3	0	0	0	0	0	55	0
Arsenal Kyiv	2012–13	Ukrainian Premier League	9	0	2	0	2 (Note: Two appearances in Europa League third qualifying round)	0	0	0	13	0
Kryvbas Kryvyi Rih	2012–13	Ukrainian Premier League	11	0	0	0	0	0	0	0	11	0
Karpaty Lviv	2013–14	Ukrainian Premier League	14	0	1	0	0	0	0	0	15	0
Karpaty Lviv	2014–15	Ukrainian Premier League	21	1	2	0	0	0	0	0	23	1
Karpaty Lviv	2015–16	Ukrainian Premier League	20	0	1	0	0	0	0	0	21	0
Karpaty Lviv	Total		52	1	4	0	0	0	0	0	56	1
Oleksandriya	2016–17	Ukrainian Premier League	18	1	1	0	2 (Note: Two appearances in Europa League third qualifying round)	0	0	0	21	1
Oleksandriya	2017–18	Ukrainian Premier League	25	1	1	0	4 (Note: Two appearances in Europa League third qualifying round) (Note: Two appearances in Europa League Second qualifying round)	0	0	0	30	1
Oleksandriya	Total		43	2	2	0	6	0	0	0	51	2
Desna Chernihiv	2018–19	Ukrainian Premier League	24	2	1	0	0	0	0	0	25	2
Desna Chernihiv	2019–20	Ukrainian Premier League	31	3	1	0	0	0	0	0	32	3
Desna Chernihiv	2020–21	Ukrainian Premier League	20	3	1	0	1 (Note: One appearance in Europa League third qualifying round)	0	0	0	22	3
Desna Chernihiv	Total		75	8	3	0	0	0	0	0	78	8
Polissya Zhytomyr	2021–22	Ukrainian First League	17	3	1	0	0	0	0	0	18	3
Polissya Zhytomyr	2022–23	Ukrainian First League	10	1	0	0	0	0	0	0	10	1
Polissya Zhytomyr	Total		27	4	1	0	0	0	0	0	27	4
Career total			338	16	19	0	9	0	0	0	366	16

== Honours ==
Oleksandriya

- Ukrainian First League: 2010–11

Individual

- Best player round 26 Ukrainian Premier League: 2019–20

== Gallery ==
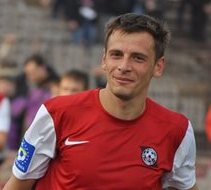
Hitchenko

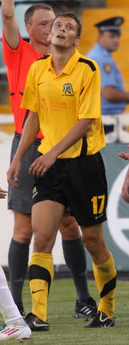
Hitchenko with Oleksandriya
