= Artur Karnoza =

Ukrainian footballer (born 1990)

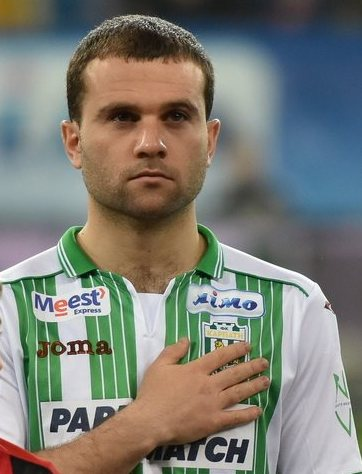

Personal information
- Full name: Artur Oleksandrovych Karnoza
- Date of birth: 2 August 1990 (age 36)
- Place of birth: Dnipropetrovsk, Soviet Union (now Ukraine)
- Height: 1.63 m (5 ft 4 in)
- Position: Midfielder

Youth career
- 2002–2005: Dnipro Dnipropetrovsk

Senior career*
Years	Team	Apps	(Gls)
2005–2011	Dnipro Dnipropetrovsk	3	(0)
2011	→ Naftovyk-Ukrnafta Okhtyrka (loan)	13	(4)
2011–2012	Naftovyk-Ukrnafta Okhtyrka	31	(12)
2012–2014	Sevastopol	47	(9)
2014–2016	Karpaty Lviv	34	(5)
2017	Chornomorets Odesa	4	(0)
2018	Dnipro-1	5	(1)
2018	Chornomorets Odesa	9	(0)
2019–2020	Mynai	25	(5)
2021	Kryvbas Kryvyi Rih	11	(0)
2021–2022	Alians Lypova Dolyna	18	(0)
Total		200	(36)

International career^{‡}
2005–2006	Ukraine U16	12	(3)
2005–2007	Ukraine U17	19	(4)
2007–2008	Ukraine U18	14	(4)
2007–2009	Ukraine U19	17	(1)
2012	Ukraine U21	1	(0)
Medal record
Men's football
Representing Ukraine
UEFA European Under-19 Championship
Winner	2009 Ukraine
- * Club domestic league appearances and goals as of 26 January 2022 ‡ National team caps and goals as of 11 January 2020

Artur Oleksandrovych Karnoza (Ukrainian: Артур Олександрович Карноза; born 2 August 1990) is a Ukrainian retired professional football midfielder.

Karnoza was also the captain of the Ukrainian National Under-19 Football Team.

== Honours ==
2009 UEFA European Under-19 Football Championship: Champion
