= Denys Miroshnichenko =

Ukrainian footballer (born 1994)

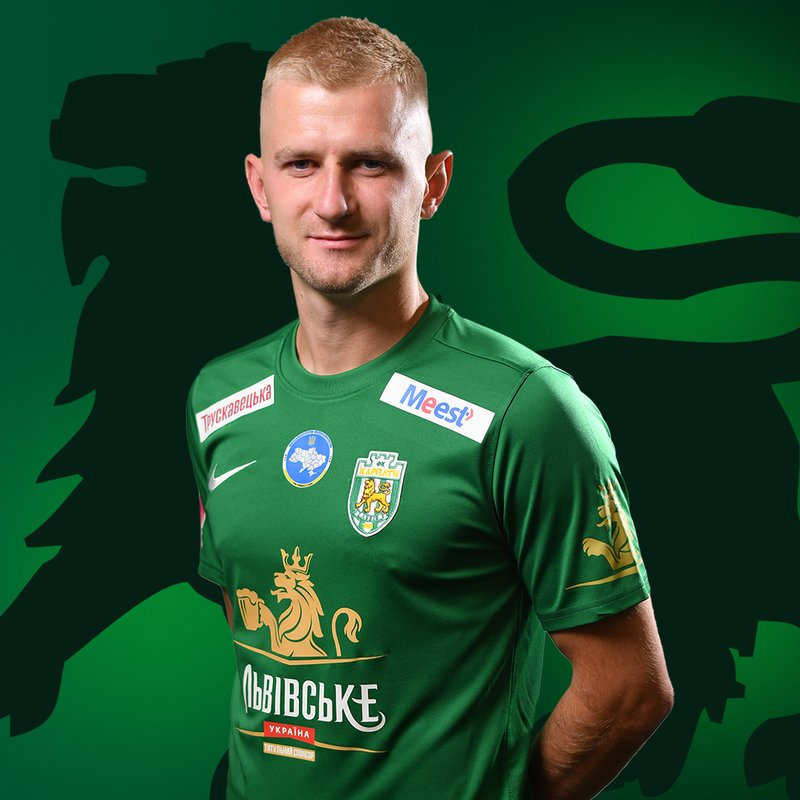
- Miroshnichenko in 2024

Personal information
- Full name: Denys Andriyovych Miroshnichenko
- Date of birth: 11 October 1994 (age 32)
- Place of birth: Kryvyi Rih, Ukraine
- Height: 1.77 m (5 ft 10 in)
- Position: Defender

Team information
- Current team: Karpaty Lviv
- Number: 11

Youth career
- 2007–2011: Kryvbas Kryvyi Rih

Senior career*
Years	Team	Apps	(Gls)
2011–2013	Kryvbas Kryvyi Rih	9	(0)
2012	→ Dnipro Dnipropetrovsk (loan)	0	(0)
2013–2019	Karpaty Lviv	144	(3)
2019–2023	Oleksandriya	89	(4)
2023–2024	Dnipro-1	24	(1)
2024–	Karpaty Lviv	49	(2)

International career^{‡}
2012–2013	Ukraine U19	8	(0)
2014–2016	Ukraine U21	26	(0)
- * Club domestic league appearances and goals as of 3 June 2026 ‡ National team caps and goals as of 7 March 2023

Denys Andriyovych Miroshnichenko (Ukrainian: Денис Андрійович Мірошніченко; born 11 October 1994) is a Ukrainian professional footballer who plays as a defender for Karpaty Lviv in the Ukrainian Premier League.

== Club career ==
Miroshnichenko is a product of Kryvbas Kryvyi Rih academy. He made his debut for Kryvbas Kryvyi Rih coming in as a second-half substitute against Dynamo Kyiv on 3 March 2013 in the Ukrainian Premier League.

On 8 July 2024, Miroshnichenko returned to Karpaty Lviv.
