= 2010–11 FC Karpaty Lviv season =

Karpaty Lviv
2010–11 season
- Chairman: (Ukraine) Petro Dyminsky
- Manager: (Belarus) Oleg Kononov
- Stadium: Ukraina Stadium, Lviv
- Premier League: 5th
- Ukrainian Cup: Quarter-finals
- Europa League: Group stage
- Top goalscorer: League: Denys Kozhanov (7); All: Denys Kozhanov (9)
- Highest home attendance: 27,925 vs Sevilla; 21 October 2010
- Lowest home attendance: 4,000 vs Vorskla; 21 May 2011

The 2010–11 FC Karpaty Lviv season was the 48th season in club history.

== Review and events ==
On 2 June 2010 FC Karpaty gathered at club's base for medical inspection after vacations. The club went to two-week training camp in Austria on 21 June 2010 with three friendly matches scheduled.

=== Friendly matches ===
==== Pre-season ====
18 June 2010 Friendly match	Karpaty Lviv	3–0	Zakarpattia Uzhhorod	Lviv
17:30	Batista 69', 73', 84'	Report		Stadium: SKA Stadium; Referee: Andriy Hrysyo

24 June 2010 Friendly match	Zenit Saint Petersburg (Russia)	1–0	Karpaty Lviv	Hallein, Austria
14:15	Zyryanov 34'	Report		Referee: Alexandru Tudor (Romania)

27 June 2010 Friendly match	Rostov (Russia)	0–2	Karpaty Lviv	Walchsee, Austria
16:00		Report	Guruli 16'; Oshchypko 32'

2 July 2010 Friendly match	Viktoria Plzeň (Czech Republic)	0–2	Karpaty Lviv	Austria
17:00		Report	Batista 48'; Kozhanov 55'	Referee: ? (Romania)

==== Mid-season ====
10 December 2010 Friendly match	Çorumspor (Turkey)	0–5	Karpaty Lviv	Belek, Turkey
		Report	Khudobyak; Hudyma; H.Baranets; Sahaydak	Stadium: Sueno Belek Sports Complex

==== Winter break ====
25 January 2011 Friendly match	Association of Spanish Footballers (Spain)	2–2	Karpaty Lviv	Benidorm, Spain
15:30 CET (UTC+1)	? 34' ? 39'	Report	Kuznetsov 3'; Khudobyak 18'	Stadium: Estadio Municipal Guillermo Amor; Referee: ? (Spain)

28 January 2011 Copa del Sol. Round of 16	Molde (Norway)	1–1 (3–4 p)	Karpaty Lviv	Elche, Spain
19:00 CET (UTC+1)	Angan 30'	Report	Kozhanov 24' (pen.)	Stadium: Estadio Martínez Valero
	Penalties
	Diouf (penalty scored); Steen (penalty scored); Angan (penalty scored); Ulvestad (penalty missed); Holm (penalty missed)		(penalty scored) Guruli; (penalty scored) Oshchypko; (penalty scored) Tkachuk; (penalty scored) Tubić

31 January 2011 Copa del Sol. Quarter-finals	Göteborg (Sweden)	0–1	Karpaty Lviv	La Manga, Spain
16:00 CET (UTC+1)		Report	Kuznetsov 54'	Stadium: La Manga Stadium

3 February 2011 Copa del Sol. Semi-finals	Aalesund (Norway)	1–1 (6–7 p)	Karpaty Lviv	La Manga, Spain
18:45 CET (UTC+1)	Herrera 46'	Report	Holodyuk 34'	Stadium: La Manga Stadium
	Penalties
	Barrantes (penalty scored); Fuhre (penalty scored); Fløtre (penalty scored); Herrera (penalty scored); Skiri (penalty scored); Skagestad (penalty scored); Tollås (penalty missed)		(penalty scored) Kozhanov; (penalty scored) Holodyuk; (penalty scored) Tkachuk; (penalty scored) Oshchypko; (penalty scored) Tubić; (penalty scored) Thiago; (penalty scored) Kopolovets

7 February 2011 Copa del Sol. Final	Shakhtar Donetsk	0–1	Karpaty Lviv	La Manga, Spain
19:00 CET (UTC+1)		Report	Khudobyak 59'	Stadium: La Manga Stadium

18 February 2011 Friendly match	Litex Lovech (Bulgaria)	3–3	Karpaty Lviv	Antalya, Turkey
15:15 EET (UTC+2)	Tom 58' (pen.); Djermanović 65', 82'	Report	Hudyma 69'; Cociș 80', 90'	Stadium: Rixos Lares Hotel Stadium; Referee: Vladimir Pettay (Russia)

22 February 2011 Friendly match	Silkeborg (Denmark)	1–2	Karpaty Lviv	Antalya, Turkey
15:00 EET (UTC+2)	Petrivskyi 30' (o.g.)	Report	Khudobyak 20'; Cociș 39'

26 February 2011 Friendly match	Dinamo Moscow (Russia)	0–1	Karpaty Lviv	Belek, Turkey
		Report	Epureanu 53' (o.g.)	Stadium: Pitch of Cornelia de Lux Hotel

==== Mid-season 2 ====
26 March 2011 Friendly match	Ruch Chorzów (Poland)	0–3	Karpaty Lviv	Chorzów, Poland
12:00 CET (UTC+1)		Report	Batista 8', 32'; Zenjov 90'	Stadium: Stadion Miejski; Attendance: 1,000; Referee: Miroslaw Gurecki (Poland)

=== Premier League ===
==== League table ====
Pos	Team	Pld	W	D	L	GF	GA	GD	Pts	Qualification or relegation
3	Metalist Kharkiv	30	18	6	6	58	26	+32	60	Qualification to Europa League play-off round
4	Dnipro Dnipropetrovsk	30	16	9	5	46	20	+26	57	Qualification to Europa League play-off round
5	Karpaty Lviv	30	13	9	8	41	34	+7	48	Qualification to Europa League third qualifying round
6	Vorskla Poltava	30	10	9	11	37	32	+5	39	Qualification to Europa League second qualifying round (Note: Since the 2011 Ukrainian Cup Final was between 2 teams that had already qualified for the 2011–12 UEFA Champions League (Shakhtar Donetsk and Dynamo Kyiv) the 6th placed team (Vorskla Poltava) qualified for the 2011–12 UEFA Europa League.)
7	Tavriya Simferopol	30	10	9	11	44	46	−2	39	

Source: uafootball.net.ua
Rules for classification: 1st points; 2nd goal difference; 3rd goals scored; 4th fair play

==== Results summary ====
Overall								Home						Away					
Pld	W	D	L	GF	GA	GD	Pts	W	D	L	GF	GA	GD	W	D	L	GF	GA	GD
30	13	8	9	41	34	+7	47	11	2	2	25	12	+13	2	6	7	16	22	−6

==== Matches ====
10 July 2010 1	Dnipro Dnipropetrovsk	1–0	Karpaty Lviv	Dnipropetrovsk
17:30	Cheberyachko 85'	Report		Stadium: Dnipro Arena; Attendance: 17,406; Referee: Ihor Ishchenko

18 July 2010 2	Kryvbas Kryvyi Rih	0–0	Karpaty Lviv	Kryvyi Rih
20:00		Report		Stadium: Metalurh Stadium; Attendance: 4,500; Referee: Serhiy Boyko

25 July 2010 3	Karpaty Lviv	1–0	Metalurh Zaporizhya	Lviv
17:00	Fedetskyi 55'	Report		Stadium: Ukraina Stadium; Attendance: 6,000; Referee: Serhiy Lysenchuk

1 August 2010 4	Zorya Luhansk	2–2	Karpaty Lviv	Luhansk
17:30	Vitsenets 51'; Silyuk 65'	Report	Tkachuk 5' (pen.); Hudyma 26'	Stadium: Avanhard Stadium; Attendance: 6,200; Referee: Vitaliy Hodulyan

8 August 2010 5	Karpaty Lviv	2–1	Arsenal Kyiv	Lviv
19:00	Kozhanov 4'; Batista 90+4'	Report	Shatskikh 45+1' (pen.)	Stadium: Ukraina Stadium; Attendance: 10,000; Referee: Dmytro Zhukov

15 August 2010 6	Shakhtar Donetsk	1–0	Karpaty Lviv	Donetsk
19:00	Willian 45+1'	Report		Stadium: Donbas Arena; Attendance: 35,008; Referee: Oleh Derevynskyi

22 August 2010 7	Karpaty Lviv	2–1	FC Sevastopol	Lviv
20:30	Kopolovets 38'; Holodyuk 67'	Report	Ferenchak 46'	Stadium: Ukraina Stadium; Attendance: 8,000; Referee: Mykhaylo Rodionenko

30 August 2010 8	Karpaty Lviv	1–0	Volyn Lutsk	Lviv
19:00	Zenjov 63'	Report		Stadium: Ukraina Stadium; Attendance: 6,000; Referee: Oleh Zubarev

12 September 2010 9	Illichivets Mariupol	2–3	Karpaty Lviv	Mariupol
19:00	Kozoriz 50'; Antonov 73'	Report	Holodyuk 4'; Zenjov 25'; Kozhanov 43'	Stadium: Illichivets Stadium; Attendance: 4,500; Referee: Ihor Pokydko

19 September 2010 10	Karpaty Lviv	3–0	Obolon Kyiv	Lviv
17:00	Kuznetsov 66', 80'; Khudobyak 90+2'	Report		Stadium: Ukraina Stadium; Attendance: 10,000; Referee: Volodymyr Holovko

26 September 2010 11	Tavriya Simferopol	3–1	Karpaty Lviv	Simferopol
20:00	Kornyev 11'; Idahor 33', 71'	Report	Zenjov 14'	Stadium: Lokomotyv Stadium; Attendance: 5,100; Referee: Vitaliy Hodulyan

3 October 2010 12	Karpaty Lviv	0–1	Metalist Kharkiv	Lviv
16:00		Report	Oliynyk 73'	Stadium: Ukraina Stadium; Attendance: 15,200; Referee: Volodymyr Sirenko

16 October 2010 13	Dynamo Kyiv	1–0	Karpaty Lviv	Kyiv
15:00	Almeida 12'	Report		Stadium: Valeriy Lobanovskyi Dynamo Stadium; Attendance: 10,523; Referee: Yuriy Vaks

24 October 2010 14	Karpaty Lviv	2–1	Metalurh Donetsk	Lviv
20:00	Kozhanov 25'; Godwin 40'	Report	Volovyk 90+3'	Stadium: Ukraina Stadium; Attendance: 5,000; Referee: Viktor Shvetsov

30 October 2010 15	Vorskla Poltava	1–1	Karpaty Lviv	Poltava
15:00	Januzi 23'	Report	Kuznetsov 53'	Stadium: Butovsky Vorskla Stadium; Attendance: 2,000; Referee: Oleh Derevynskyi

7 November 2010 16	Karpaty Lviv	0–0	Dnipro Dnipropetrovsk	Lviv
20:00		Report		Stadium: Ukraina Stadium; Attendance: 9,000; Referee: Yevhen Aranovskyi

14 November 2010 17	Karpaty Lviv	2–1	Kryvbas Kryvyi Rih	Lviv
18:00	Holodyuk 9'; Khudobyak 71'	Report	Varankow 73'	Stadium: Ukraina Stadium; Attendance: 9,000; Referee: Anatoliy Abdula

21 November 2010 18	Metalurh Zaporizhya	0–0	Karpaty Lviv	Zaporizhia
18:00		Report		Stadium: Slavutych-Arena; Attendance: 4,000; Referee: Serhiy Boyko

27 November 2010 19	Karpaty Lviv	4–2	Zorya Luhansk	Lviv
15:00	Khudobyak 2'; Kuznetsov 62', 89'; Checher 73'	Report	Silyuk 34'; Tubić 45+2' (o.g.)	Stadium: Ukraina Stadium; Attendance: 6,000; Referee: Dmytro Kutakov

6 March 2011 20	Arsenal Kyiv	2–2	Karpaty Lviv	Kyiv
17:00	Mazilu 50'; Gusev 55'	Report	Balažic 64'; Milošević 90+2'	Stadium: Bannikov Stadium; Attendance: 1,945; Referee: Anatoliy Abdula

13 March 2011 21	Karpaty Lviv	1–0	Shakhtar Donetsk	Lviv
16:00	Cociș 58'	Report		Stadium: Ukraina Stadium; Attendance: 27,000; Referee: Viktor Shvetsov

19 March 2011 22	FC Sevastopol	3–1	Karpaty Lviv	Simferopol
16:00	Zhabokrytskyy 11'; Skoba 59'; Ferenchak 88'	Report	Cociș 45'	Stadium: Lokomotyv Stadium; Attendance: 2,000; Referee: Ihor Pokydko

3 April 2011 23	Volyn Lutsk	0–3	Karpaty Lviv	Lutsk
17:30		Report	Kozhanov 3', 33'; Khudobyak 59'	Stadium: Avanhard Stadium; Attendance: 11,200; Referee: Yuriy Vaks

10 April 2011 24	Karpaty Lviv	3–1	Illichivets Mariupol	Lviv
16:00	Khudobyak 29'; Tkachuk 84' (pen.); Holodyuk 90+4'	Report	Yaroshenko 7'	Stadium: Ukraina Stadium; Attendance: 9,000; Referee: Mykhaylo Rodionenko

15 April 2011 25	Obolon Kyiv	1–1	Karpaty Lviv	Kyiv
17:00	Lozynskyi 33' (pen.)	Report	Zenjov 51'	Stadium: Obolon Arena; Attendance: 3,500; Referee: Anatoliy Abdula

23 April 2011 26	Karpaty Lviv	1–0	Tavriya Simferopol	Lviv
15:00	Fedetskyi 40'	Report		Stadium: Ukraina Stadium; Attendance: 10,000; Referee: Oleksandr Derdo

30 April 2011 27	Metalist Kharkiv	1–1	Karpaty Lviv	Kharkiv
16:00	Dević 71'	Report	Batista 16'	Stadium: Dynamo Stadium; Attendance: 6,516; Referee: Ihor Pokydko

7 May 2011 28	Karpaty Lviv	1–2	Dynamo Kyiv	Lviv
16:00	Kopolovets 75'	Report	Husyev 32'; Vukojević 53'	Stadium: Ukraina Stadium; Attendance: 27,500; Referee: Dmytro Zhukov

15 May 2011 29	Metalurh Donetsk	4–1	Karpaty Lviv	Donetsk
16:00	Lazić 67', 69'; Fernandes 71'; Checher 82'	Report	Khudobyak 90+3'	Stadium: Metalurh Stadium; Attendance: 210; Referee: Anatoliy Zhabchenko

21 May 2011 30	Karpaty Lviv	2–2	Vorskla Poltava	Lviv
16:00	Kozhanov 53', 62'	Report	Asipenka 45'; Januzi 88'	Stadium: Ukraina Stadium; Attendance: 4,000; Referee: Serhiy Lysenchuk

=== Ukrainian Cup ===
22 September 2010 Round of 32	Hirnyk-Sport Komsomolsk	0–5	Karpaty Lviv	Komsomolsk
16:00		Report	Habovda 11', 67', 90+1'; H.Baranets 40'; Checher 56'	Stadium: Yunist Stadium; Attendance: 2,100; Referee: Oleksandr Ivanov

27 October 2010 Round of 16	Karpaty Lviv	3–0	Vorskla Poltava	Lviv
19:00	Kuznetsov 54', 73'; Guruli 68'	Report		Stadium: Ukraina Stadium; Attendance: 7,000; Referee: Serhiy Lysenchuk

10 November 2010 Quarter-finals	Karpaty Lviv	0–2	Arsenal Kyiv	Lviv
19:00		Report	Samodin 7'; Gusev 82'	Stadium: Ukraina Stadium; Attendance: 27,000; Referee: Yaroslav Kozyk

=== UEFA Europa League ===
==== Qualifying rounds ====
15 July 2010 2nd qualifying round. 1st leg	KR Reykjavík (Iceland)	0–3	Karpaty Lviv	Reykjavík, Iceland
19:15 GMT (UTC±0)		Report	Guruli 46'; Tkachuk 51'; Batista 57'	Stadium: KR-völlur; Attendance: 848; Referee: Michael Lerjeus (Sweden)

22 July 2010 2nd qualifying round. 2nd leg	Karpaty Lviv	3–2 (6–2 agg.)	(Iceland) KR Reykjavík	Lviv
19:15 EEST (UTC+3)	Zenjov 2'; Fedetskyi 25'; B.Baranets 69'	Report	Finnbogason 61', 65'	Stadium: Ukraina Stadium; Attendance: 13,200; Referee: Fabian Mihaly (Hungary)

29 July 2010 3rd qualifying round. 1st leg	Karpaty Lviv	1–0	(Georgia (country)) Zestaponi	Lviv
19:15 EEST (UTC+3)	Khudobyak 6'	Report		Stadium: Ukraina Stadium; Attendance: 12,100; Referee: Lars Chritoffersen (Denmark)

5 August 2010 3rd qualifying round. 2nd leg	Zestaponi (Georgia (country))	0–1 (0–2 agg.)	Karpaty Lviv	Zestaponi, Georgia
20:00 (UTC+4)		Report	Kozhanov 90+1'	Stadium: David Abashidze Stadium; Attendance: 4,558; Referee: Tommy Skjerven (Norway)

19 August 2010 Play-off round. 1st leg	Galatasaray (Turkey)	2–2	Karpaty Lviv	Istanbul, Turkey
21:00 EEST (UTC+3)	Baroš 59', 86'	Report	Kuznetsov 34'; Zenjov 41'	Stadium: Ali Sami Yen Stadium; Attendance: 15,182; Referee: Mark Clattenburg (England)

26 August 2010 Play-off round. 2nd leg	Karpaty Lviv	1–1 ((a) 3 – 3 agg.)	(Turkey) Galatasaray	Lviv
21:45 EEST (UTC+3)	Fedetskyi 90+3'	Report	Aydin 90+1'	Stadium: Ukraina Stadium; Attendance: 25,000; Referee: Thorsten Kinhöfer (Germany)

==== Group stage ====
Pos	Team	Pld	W	D	L	GF	GA	GD	Pts	Qualification	PSG	SEV	DOR	KAR
1	(France) Paris Saint-Germain	6	3	3	0	9	4	+5	12	Advance to knockout phase	—	4–2	0–0	2–0
2	(Spain) Sevilla	6	3	1	2	10	7	+3	10	Advance to knockout phase	0–1	—	2–2	4–0
3	(Germany) Borussia Dortmund	6	2	3	1	10	7	+3	9		1–1	0–1	—	3–0
4	(Ukraine) Karpaty Lviv	6	0	1	5	4	15	−11	1		1–1	0–1	3–4	—

Source: Soccerway

16 September 2010 1	Karpaty Lviv	3–4	(Germany) Borussia Dortmund	Lviv
22:05 EEST (UTC+3)	Holodyuk 44'; Kopolovets 52'; Kozhanov 79'	Report	Şahin 12' (pen.); Götze 27', 90+2'; Barrios 87'	Stadium: Ukraina Stadium; Attendance: 27,700; Referee: Claudio Circhetta (Switzerland)

30 September 2010 2	Paris Saint-Germain (France)	2–0	Karpaty Lviv	Paris, France
19:00 CEST (UTC+2)	Jallet 4'; Nenê 20'	Report		Stadium: Parc des Princes; Attendance: 9,117; Referee: Marijo Strahonja (Croatia)

21 October 2010 3	Karpaty Lviv	0–1	(Spain) Sevilla	Lviv
20:00 EEST (UTC+3)		Report	Kanouté 34'	Stadium: Ukraina Stadium; Attendance: 27,925; Referee: Bas Nijhuis (Netherlands)

4 November 2010 4	Sevilla (Spain)	4–0	Karpaty Lviv	Seville, Spain
21:05 CET (UTC+1)	Alfaro 9', 42'; Cigarini 31'; Negredo 51'	Report		Stadium: Ramón Sánchez Pizjuán Stadium; Attendance: 21,394; Referee: Bülent Yıldırım (Turkey)

2 December 2010 5	Borussia Dortmund (Germany)	3–0	Karpaty Lviv	Dortmund, Germany
19:00 CET (UTC+1)	Kagawa 5'; Hummels 49'; Lewandowski 89'	Report		Stadium: Westfalenstadion; Attendance: 40,100; Referee: Eric Braamhaar (Netherlands)

15 December 2010 6	Karpaty Lviv	1–1	(France) Paris Saint-Germain	Lviv
22:05 EET (UTC+2)	Fedetskyi 45'	Report	Luyindula 39'	Stadium: Ukraina Stadium; Attendance: 14,000; Referee: Espen Berntsen (Norway)

== Squad information ==
=== Squad and statistics ===
==== Squad, appearances and goals ====
No.	Pos	Nat	Player	Total		Premier League		Ukrainian Cup		Europa League	
No.	Pos	Nat	Player	Apps	Goals	Apps	Goals	Apps	Goals	Apps	Goals
4	DF	(Serbia) SRB	Ivan Milošević	32	1	23	1	0	0	9	0
7	MF	(Nigeria) NGR	Samson Godwin	34	1	22+3	1	1	0	8	0
8	DF	(Ukraine) UKR	Ihor Oshchypko	13	0	10	0	0	0	3	0
9	MF	(Ukraine) UKR	Denys Kozhanov	40	9	26+1	7	2	0	11	2
10	MF	(Georgia (country)) GEO	Alexander Guruli	29	2	7+11	0	1+2	1	3+5	1
11	FW	(Estonia) EST	Sergei Zenjov	28	6	11+7	4	0	0	8+2	2
13	FW	(Ukraine) UKR	Oleksiy Omel'chenko	1	0	0	0	0+1	0	0	0
15	DF	(Ukraine) UKR	Taras Petrivskyi	19	0	11+5	0	1	0	2	0
16	MF	(Ukraine) UKR	Ihor Khudobyak	39	7	26	6	2	0	11	1
17	MF	(Ukraine) UKR	Oleh Holodyuk	25	5	16+2	4	1	0	5+1	1
18	FW	(Ukraine) UKR	Mykhaylo Kopolovets	33	3	6+18	2	0+1	0	3+5	1
19	MF	(Ukraine) UKR	Yaroslav Martynyuk	5	0	0+2	0	1	0	1+1	0
21	DF	(Slovenia) SLO	Gregor Balažic	5	1	5	1	0	0	0	0
22	GK	(Ukraine) UKR	Andriy Tlumak	26	0	15	0	2	0	9	0
25	MF	(Ukraine) UKR	Andriy Tkachuk	33	3	20+3	2	1	0	7+2	1
29	FW	(Spain) ESP	Lucas Pérez	8	0	4+4	0	0	0	0	0
32	GK	(North Macedonia) MKD	Martin Bogatinov	8	0	8	0	0	0	0	0
36	FW	(Ukraine) UKR	Volodymyr Hudyma	13	1	2+4	1	1+2	0	0+4	0
37	DF	(Ukraine) UKR	Ihor Tistyk	2	0	0+1	0	0+1	0	0	0
41	DF	(Ukraine) UKR	Stepan Hirskyi	2	0	0+1	0	1	0	0	0
44	DF	(Ukraine) UKR	Artem Fedetskyi	35	5	23	2	2	0	10	3
57	DF	(Spain) ESP	Borja Gómez	7	0	7	0	0	0	0	0
64	MF	(Ukraine) UKR	Volodymyr Bidlovskyi	1	0	0+1	0	0	0	0	0
79	FW	(Ukraine) UKR	Serhiy Kuznetsov	22	8	10+3	5	2	2	6+1	1
80	FW	(Brazil) BRA	William Batista	23	3	10+7	2	0	0	4+2	1
81	MF	(Romania) ROU	Răzvan Cociș	11	2	11	2	0	0	0	0
90	FW	(Brazil) BRA	Thiago Constância	2	0	1+1	0	0	0	0	0
99	MF	(Ukraine) UKR	Yuriy Habovda	11	3	0+4	0	3	3	0+4	0
Players away from the club on loan:
1	GK	(Ukraine) UKR	Vitaliy Rudenko	11	0	7	0	1	0	3	0
14	FW	(Ukraine) UKR	Yaroslav Svorak	1	0	0	0	0+1	0	0	0
34	DF	(Ukraine) UKR	Andriy Sahaydak	2	0	1	0	1	0	0	0
88	DF	(Brazil) BRA	Neno	3	0	1	0	0	0	1+1	0
89	DF	(Brazil) BRA	Danilo Avelar	31	0	16+2	0	2	0	10+1	0
Players featured for Karpaty but left before the end of the season:
5	DF	(Serbia) SRB	Nemanja Tubić	26	0	14	0	2	0	10	0
28	MF	(Ukraine) UKR	Hryhoriy Baranets	16	1	4+5	0	1+1	1	2+3	0
30	MF	(Ukraine) UKR	Borys Baranets	9	1	3+2	0	1	0	1+2	1
33	DF	(Ukraine) UKR	Yevhen Tarasenko	6	0	3+1	0	1	0	1	0
70	DF	(Ukraine) UKR	Vyacheslav Checher	16	2	7+1	1	3	1	4+1	0

==== Goalscorers ====
Place	Position	Nation	Number	Name	Premier League	Ukrainian Cup	Europa League	Total
1	MF	(Ukraine)	9	Denys Kozhanov	7	0	2	9
2	FW	(Ukraine)	79	Serhiy Kuznetsov	5	2	1	8
3	MF	(Ukraine)	16	Ihor Khudobyak	6	0	1	7
4	FW	(Estonia)	11	Sergei Zenjov	4	0	2	6
5	MF	(Ukraine)	17	Oleh Holodyuk	4	0	1	5
5	DF	(Ukraine)	44	Artem Fedetskyi	2	0	3	5
7	MF	(Ukraine)	99	Yuriy Habovda	0	3	0	3
7	MF	(Ukraine)	25	Andriy Tkachuk	2	0	1	3
7	FW	(Brazil)	80	William Batista	2	0	1	3
7	FW	(Ukraine)	18	Mykhaylo Kopolovets	2	0	1	3
11	MF	(Georgia (country))	10	Alexander Guruli	0	1	1	2
11	DF	(Ukraine)	70	Vyacheslav Checher	1	1	0	2
11	MF	(Romania)	81	Răzvan Cociș	2	0	0	2
14	MF	(Ukraine)	30	Borys Baranets	0	0	1	1
14	FW	(Ukraine)	36	Volodymyr Hudyma	1	0	0	1
14	MF	(Ukraine)	28	Hryhoriy Baranets	0	1	0	1
14	MF	(Nigeria)	7	Samson Godwin	1	0	0	1
14	DF	(Slovenia)	21	Gregor Balažic	1	0	0	1
14	DF	(Serbia)	4	Ivan Milošević	1	0	0	1
				TOTALS	41	8	15	64

==== Disciplinary record ====
Number	Nation	Position	Name	Total		Premier League		Ukrainian Cup		Europa League	
Number	Nation	Position	Name	Yellow card	Red card	Yellow card	Red card	Yellow card	Red card	Yellow card	Red card
1	(Ukraine)	GK	Vitaliy Rudenko	1	0	1	0	0	0	0	0
4	(Serbia)	DF	Ivan Milošević	9	0	8	0	0	0	1	0
5	(Serbia)	DF	Nemanja Tubić	4	0	2	0	0	0	2	0
7	(Nigeria)	MF	Samson Godwin	13	0	8	0	0	0	5	0
8	(Ukraine)	DF	Ihor Oshchypko	3	0	3	0	0	0	0	0
9	(Ukraine)	MF	Denys Kozhanov	3	0	2	0	0	0	1	0
10	(Georgia (country))	MF	Alexander Guruli	2	1	2	1	0	0	0	0
11	(Estonia)	FW	Sergei Zenjov	1	1	1	1	0	0	0	0
15	(Ukraine)	DF	Taras Petrivskyi	2	0	1	0	0	0	1	0
16	(Ukraine)	MF	Ihor Khudobyak	4	1	2	1	1	0	1	0
17	(Ukraine)	MF	Oleh Holodyuk	6	1	5	1	0	0	1	0
18	(Ukraine)	FW	Mykhaylo Kopolovets	7	0	5	0	0	0	2	0
19	(Ukraine)	MF	Yaroslav Martynyuk	1	0	1	0	0	0	0	0
21	(Slovenia)	DF	Gregor Balažic	1	0	1	0	0	0	0	0
22	(Ukraine)	GK	Andriy Tlumak	2	0	0	0	0	0	2	0
25	(Ukraine)	MF	Andriy Tkachuk	7	0	7	0	0	0	0	0
29	(Spain)	FW	Lucas Pérez	2	0	2	0	0	0	0	0
30	(Ukraine)	MF	Borys Baranets	1	0	1	0	0	0	0	0
32	(North Macedonia)	GK	Martin Bogatinov	1	0	1	0	0	0	0	0
37	(Ukraine)	DF	Ihor Tistyk	1	0	1	0	0	0	0	0
44	(Ukraine)	DF	Artem Fedetskyi	11	1	8	0	0	0	3	1
57	(Spain)	DF	Borja Gómez	1	0	1	0	0	0	0	0
70	(Ukraine)	DF	Vyacheslav Checher	1	1	0	0	0	0	1	1
79	(Ukraine)	FW	Serhiy Kuznetsov	0	1	0	0	0	0	0	1
80	(Brazil)	FW	William Batista	5	0	4	0	0	0	1	0
81	(Romania)	MF	Răzvan Cociș	3	0	3	0	0	0	0	0
89	(Brazil)	DF	Danilo Avelar	2	0	2	0	0	0	0	0
99	(Ukraine)	MF	Yuriy Habovda	1	0	1	0	0	0	0	0
			TOTALS	94	7	72	4	1	0	21	3

=== Transfers ===
==== In ====
No.	Pos.	Nat.	Name	Age	Moving from	Type	Transfer Window	Contract ends	Transfer fee	Sources
89	DF	(Brazil)	Danilo Avelar	20	(Brazil) Rio Claro	Loan	Summer	15 December 2010	—	
88	MF	(Brazil)	Neno	21	(Brazil) Rio Claro	Loan	Summer	15 December 2010	—	
1	GK	(Ukraine)	Vitaliy Rudenko	29	Chornomorets Odesa	End of contract	Summer	May 2012	Free	
28	MF	(Ukraine)	Hryhoriy Baranets	23	FC Lviv	Transfer	Summer	—	—	
30	MF	(Ukraine)	Borys Baranets	23	FC Lviv	Transfer	Summer	—	—	
70	DF	(Ukraine)	Vyacheslav Checher	29	Metalurh Donetsk	Loan	Summer	31 December 2010	—	
90	FW	(Brazil)	Thiago Constância	25	(Romania) Dinamo București	Transfer	—	31 December 2013	—	
29	FW	(Spain)	Lucas Pérez	22	(Spain) Rayo Vallecano	End of contract	Winter	31 December 2013	Free	
21	DF	(Slovenia)	Gregor Balažic	22	(Slovenia) Gorica	Transfer	Winter	31 December 2014	€400,000	
32	GK	(North Macedonia)	Martin Bogatinov	24	(North Macedonia) Rabotnički	Transfer	Winter	31 December 2013	—	
81	MF	(Romania)	Răzvan Cociș	27	(Saudi Arabia) Al-Nassr	Loan	Winter	31 May 2011	—	
57	DF	(Spain)	Borja Gómez	22	(Spain) Rayo Vallecano	Transfer	Winter	31 December 2013	—	

==== Out ====
No.	Pos.	Nat	Name	Age	Moving to	Type	Transfer Window	Transfer fee	Sources
88	MF	(Brazil)	Neno	21	FC Sevastopol	Loan	Summer	—	
70	DF	(Ukraine)	Vyacheslav Checher	30	Metalurh Donetsk	End of loan	Winter	—	
89	DF	(Brazil)	Danilo Avelar	21	(Germany) Schalke 04	Loan	Winter	—	
28	MF	(Ukraine)	Hryhoriy Baranets	24	Obolon Kyiv	Transfer	Winter	—	
30	MF	(Ukraine)	Borys Baranets	24	Obolon Kyiv	Transfer	Winter	—	
34	DF	(Ukraine)	Andriy Sahaydak	22	Chornomorets Odesa	Loan	Winter	—	
14	FW	(Ukraine)	Yaroslav Svorak	22	(Belarus) Dnepr Mogilev	Loan	Winter	—	
5	DF	(Serbia)	Nemanja Tubić	26	(Russia) Krasnodar	Transfer	Winter	€1,2 Million	
1	GK	(Ukraine)	Vitaliy Rudenko	30	Metalurh Zaporizhya	Loan	Winter	—	
