= 2009–10 FC Karpaty Lviv season =

Karpaty Lviv
2009–10 season
- Chairman: Petro Dyminsky
- Manager: Oleg Kononov
- Stadium: Ukraina Stadium, Lviv
- Premier League: 5th
- Ukrainian Cup: Round of 16
- Top goalscorer: League: William Batista (8); All: William Batista (10)
- Highest home attendance: 27,047 vs Shakhtar; 15 April 2010
- Lowest home attendance: 6,000 vs Metalurg D 26 July 2009

The 2009–10 FC Karpaty Lviv season was the 47th season in club history.

== Competitions ==
=== Friendly matches ===
==== Pre-season ====
15 June 2009 Friendly match	Tomasovia Tomaszów/Spartakus Szarowola (Poland)	1–2	Karpaty Lviv	Tomaszów Lubelski, Poland
	Deva 49'	Report	Kuznetsov 42'; Zenjov 90'

24 June 2009 Friendly match	Szombathelyi Haladás (Hungary)	1–4	Karpaty Lviv	Hungary
18:00 CEST (UTC+02:00)	Kenesei 13' (pen.)	Report	Oschypko 33'; Kuznetsov 45'; Zenjov 67'; Tkachuk 72'	Attendance: 250

29 June 2009 Friendly match	FC Rostov (Russia)	2–2	Karpaty Lviv	Schwarzenbach, Austria
18:00 CEST (UTC+02:00)	Gațcan 32'; Osinov 35' (pen.)	Report	Kuznetsov 28'; Kozhanov 50'

6 July 2009 Friendly match	Nyva Ternopil	1–3	Karpaty Lviv	Ternopil
18:00 EEST (UTC+03:00)	Malyi 35'	Report	Guruli 17', 32'; Bidlovskyi 90+3'	Stadium: City Stadium; Referee: Volodymyr Fedunets

11 July 2009 Friendly match	Karpaty Lviv	0–0^{[a]}	Volyn Lutsk	Lviv
18:00 EEST (UTC+03:00)		Report		Stadium: Ukraina Stadium; Referee: Orest Shmyhelsky

- ^{a} Match stopped on 62nd minute after Volyn manager Vitaliy Kvartsyanyi ordered his team off the pitch protesting against a penalty

==== Mid-season ====
11 October 2009 Friendly match	Karpaty Lviv	2–0	(Moldova) Olimpia Bălți	Lviv
16:00 EEST (UTC+03:00)	Batista 32'; Khudobyak 83'	Report		Stadium: Ukraina Stadium; Referee: Andriy Shandor

14 November 2009 Friendly match	Karpaty Lviv	3–0	Zakarpattia Uzhhorod	Lviv
13:00 EET (UTC+02:00)	Tkachuk 3'; Batista 47'; Kuznetsov 64'	Report		Stadium: Ukraina Stadium

==== Winter break ====
20 January 2010 Friendly match	Wisła Kraków (Poland)	1–2	Karpaty Lviv	Antalya, Turkey
18:00 EET (UTC+02:00)	Punoševac 65'	Report	Kozhanov 20'; Batista 62'

24 January 2010 Friendly match	Spartak Nalchik (Russia)	0–2	Karpaty Lviv	Turkey
12:30 EET (UTC+02:00)		Report	Oschypko 23'; Kuznetsov 33'

29 January 2010 Friendly match	Brașov (Romania)	3–0	Karpaty Lviv	Turkey
	Munteanu; Mateiu 65'; Nuno Diogo 80'	Report

9 February 2010 Friendly match	Slavia Sofia (Bulgaria)	1–1	Karpaty Lviv	Turkey
15:00 EET (UTC+02:00)	Joseph-Reinette 29'	Report	Martynyuk 89'

13 February 2010 Friendly match	BATE Borisov (Belarus)	2–3	Karpaty Lviv	Turkey
	Rodionov 42'; Skavysh 53'	Report	Batista 11'; Kozhanov 55'; Kopolovets 58'

16 February 2010 Friendly match	Zhemchuzhina Sochi (Russia)	4–1	Karpaty Lviv	Turkey
15:00 EET (UTC+02:00)	Goal	Report	Kozhanov 52'

20 February 2010 Friendly match	FC Moscow (Russia)	2–2	Karpaty Lviv	Turkey
19:00 EET (UTC+02:00)	Rylov 76'; Maslov 87'	Report	Khudobyak 75'; Oschypko 82' (pen.)

=== Premier League ===
==== League table ====
Pos	Team	Pld	W	D	L	GF	GA	GD	Pts	Qualification or relegation
3	Metalist Kharkiv	30	19	5	6	49	23	+26	62	Qualification to Europa League play-off round
4	Dnipro Dnipropetrovsk	30	15	9	6	48	25	+23	54	Qualification to Europa League third qualifying round
5	Karpaty Lviv	30	13	11	6	44	35	+9	50	Qualification to Europa League second qualifying round
6	Tavriya Simferopol	30	12	9	9	38	38	0	45	Qualification to Europa League play-off round
7	Arsenal Kyiv	30	11	9	10	44	41	+3	42	

Source: uafootball.net.ua
Rules for classification: 1st points; 2nd goal difference; 3rd goals scored; 4th fair play

==== Results summary ====
Overall								Home						Away					
Pld	W	D	L	GF	GA	GD	Pts	W	D	L	GF	GA	GD	W	D	L	GF	GA	GD
30	13	11	6	44	35	+9	50	8	5	2	27	16	+11	5	6	4	17	19	−2

==== Matches ====
18 July 2009 1	Vorskla Poltava	1–2	Karpaty Lviv	Poltava
18:00 EEST (UTC+03:00)	Milošević 48' (o.g.)	Report	Kuznetsov 18'; Chesnakov 31' (o.g.)	Stadium: Butovskyi Vorskla Stadium; Attendance: 6,000; Referee: Oleh Derevynskyi

26 July 2009 2	Karpaty Lviv	2–2	Metalurg Donetsk	Lviv
20:00 EEST (UTC+03:00)	Fedetskyi 6'; Khudobyak 64'	Report	Hodin 9'; Mkhitaryan 59'	Stadium: Ukraina Stadium; Attendance: 6,000; Referee: Volodymyr Sirenko

2 August 2009 3	Metalist Kharkiv	1–0	Karpaty Lviv	Kharkiv
19:00 EEST (UTC+03:00)	Gueye 88'	Report		Stadium: Metalist Stadium; Attendance: 12,000; Referee: Vitaliy Hodulyan

8 August 2009 4	Karpaty Lviv	4–0	Zorya Luhansk	Lviv
17:30 EEST (UTC+03:00)	Khudobyak 60'; Kuznetsov 65'; Batista 78', 90' (pen.)	Report		Stadium: Ukraina Stadium; Attendance: 7,000; Referee: Yevhen Aranovskyi

23 August 2009 5	Arsenal Kyiv	0–0	Karpaty Lviv	Boryspil
17:00 EEST (UTC+03:00)		Report		Stadium: Kolos Stadium; Attendance: 3,560; Referee: Ihor Pokydko

30 August 2009 6	Karpaty Lviv	5–0	Obolon Kyiv	Lviv
19:00 EEST (UTC+03:00)	Khudobyak 10', 15'; Zenjov 40'; Kuznetsov 53'; Batista 90'	Report		Stadium: Ukraina Stadium; Attendance: 15,000; Referee: Oleksandr Derdo

19 September 2009 7	Dnipro Dnipropetrovsk	3–0	Karpaty Lviv	Dnipropetrovsk
19:00 EEST (UTC+03:00)	Nazarenko 30', 83' (pen.); Seleznyov 34'	Report		Stadium: Dnipro-Arena; Attendance: 13,129; Referee: Ihor Ischenko

27 September 2009 8	Chornomorets Odesa	1–1	Karpaty Lviv	Odesa
16:00 EEST (UTC+03:00)	Shandruk 79'	Report	Fedetskyi 78'	Stadium: Spartak Stadium; Attendance: 4,600; Referee: Oleh Zubarev

4 October 2009 9	Karpaty Lviv	1–0	Zakarpattia Uzhhorod	Lviv
16:00 EEST (UTC+03:00)	Kuznetsov 90'	Report		Stadium: Ukraina Stadium; Attendance: 11,000; Referee: Yevhen Venger

18 October 2009 10	Shakhtar Donetsk	5–1	Karpaty Lviv	Donetsk
16:00 EEST (UTC+03:00)	Fernandinho 6' (pen.), 58'; Jádson 14' (pen.); Luiz Adriano 76' (pen.), 87'	Report	Holodyuk 68'	Stadium: Donbas Arena; Attendance: 40,371; Referee: Ihor Ischenko

24 October 2009 11	Karpaty Lviv	3–3	Metalurh Zaporizhya	Lviv
19:00 EEST (UTC+03:00)	Kozhanov 44'; Oschypko 65'; Fedetskyi 75'	Report	Teikeu 4'; Alozie 28', 40'	Stadium: Ukraina Stadium; Attendance: 8,000; Referee: Serhiy Boyko

31 October 2009 12	Dynamo Kyiv	1–1	Karpaty Lviv	Kyiv
19:00 EET (UTC+02:00)	Ninković 60'	Report	Zenjov 6'	Stadium: Valeriy Lobanovskyi Dynamo Stadium; Attendance: 6,500; Referee: Yevhen Herenda

22 November 2009 14	Kryvbas Kryvyi Rih	1–2	Karpaty Lviv	Kryvyi Rih
15:00 EET (UTC+02:00)	Bartulović 27' (pen.)	Report	Holodyuk 6'; Kuznetsov 81'	Stadium: Metalurh Stadium; Attendance: 2,000; Referee: Oleksandr Derdo

28 November 2009 15	Karpaty Lviv	2–2	Illichivets Mariupol	Lviv
13:00 EET (UTC+02:00)	Fedetskyi 39'; Kozhanov 73'	Report	Melnyk 24'; Pukanych 75'	Stadium: Ukraina Stadium; Attendance: 8,000; Referee: Viktor Shvetsov

5 December 2009 16	Karpaty Lviv	1–0	Vorskla Poltava	Lviv
15:00 EET (UTC+02:00)	Fedetskyi 83'	Report		Stadium: Ukraina Stadium; Attendance: 8,000; Referee: Serhiy Dankovskyi

13 December 2009 17	Metalurg Donetsk	1–0	Karpaty Lviv	Donetsk
14:00 EET (UTC+02:00)	Checher 29'	Report		Stadium: Metalurh Stadium; Attendance: 1,000; Referee: Volodymyr Sirenko

27 February 2010 18	Karpaty Lviv	2–1	Metalist Kharkiv	Lviv
15:00 EET (UTC+02:00)	Oshchypko 17' (pen.); Holodyuk 55'	Report	Jajá 11'	Stadium: Ukraina Stadium; Attendance: 15,000; Referee: Yevhen Aranovskyi

6 March 2010 19	Zorya Luhansk	0–2	Karpaty Lviv	Luhansk
13:00 EET (UTC+02:00)		Report	Oshchypko 41' (pen.); Fedetskyi 52'	Stadium: Avanhard Stadium; Attendance: 9,000; Referee: Serhiy Dankovskyi

13 March 2010 20	Karpaty Lviv	3–3	Arsenal Kyiv	Lviv
17:00 EET (UTC+02:00)	Batista 41'; Fedetskyi 60'; Tkachuk 90+1'	Report	Shakhov 20'; Șoavă 68'; Shatskikh 72'	Stadium: Ukraina Stadium; Attendance: 8,000; Referee: Ihor Pokydko

20 March 2010 21	Obolon Kyiv	1–3	Karpaty Lviv	Kyiv
13:30 EET (UTC+02:00)	Yavorskyi 23'	Report	Zenjov 11'; Oshchypko 71' (pen.); Kozhanov 78'	Stadium: Obolon Arena; Attendance: 4,500; Referee: Oleh Zubarev

28 March 2010 22	Karpaty Lviv	1–0	Dnipro Dnipropetrovsk	Lviv
18:00 EEST (UTC+03:00)	Khudobyak 25'	Report		Stadium: Ukraina Stadium; Attendance: 27,000; Referee: Ihor Ischenko

2 April 2010 23	Karpaty Lviv	1–1	Chornomorets Odesa	Lviv
19:00 EEST (UTC+03:00)	Batista 24'	Report	Saucedo 18'	Stadium: Ukraina Stadium; Attendance: 12,000; Referee: Volodymyr Sirenko

7 April 2010 13	Karpaty Lviv	1–0	Tavriya Simferopol	Lviv
19:00 EEST (UTC+03:00)	Oshchypko 79'	Report		Stadium: Ukraina Stadium; Attendance: 18,000; Referee: Serhiy Boyko

11 April 2010 24	Zakarpattia Uzhhorod	1–1	Karpaty Lviv	Uzhhorod
16:00 EEST (UTC+03:00)	Mykulyak 90+2'	Report	Batista 28'	Stadium: Avanhard Stadium; Attendance: 2,000; Referee: Mykhaylo Rodionenko

15 April 2010 25	Karpaty Lviv	0–2	Shakhtar Donetsk	Lviv
19:00 EEST (UTC+03:00)		Report	Luiz Adriano 79'; Willian 90+1'	Stadium: Ukraina Stadium; Attendance: 27,047; Referee: Ihor Pokydko

19 April 2010 26	Metalurh Zaporizhya	0–1	Karpaty Lviv	Zaporizhia
19:00 EEST (UTC+03:00)		Report	Oshchypko 15' (pen.)	Stadium: Slavutych-Arena; Attendance: 5,600; Referee: Ihor Ischenko

24 April 2010 27	Karpaty Lviv	1–0	Dynamo Kyiv	Lviv
18:30 EEST (UTC+03:00)	Batista 63'	Report		Stadium: Ukraina Stadium; Attendance: 27,029; Referee: Viktor Shvetsov

1 May 2010 28	Tavriya Simferopol	1–1	Karpaty Lviv	Simferopol
19:00 EEST (UTC+03:00)	Feshchuk 58'	Report	Tkachuk 16'	Stadium: Lokomotyv Stadium; Attendance: 8,100; Referee: Oleh Derevinskyi

5 May 2010 29	Karpaty Lviv	0–2	Kryvbas Kryvyi Rih	Lviv
19:00 EEST (UTC+03:00)		Report	Fedorchuk 4'; Varankow 30'	Stadium: Ukraina Stadium; Attendance: 15,000; Referee: Serhiy Lysenchuk

9 May 2010 30	Illichivets Mariupol	2–2	Karpaty Lviv	Mariupol
16:00 EEST (UTC+03:00)	Kasyan 59'; Yaroshenko 72' (pen.)	Report	Tubić 4'; Batista 35'	Stadium: Illichivets Stadium; Attendance: 4,500; Referee: Yuriy Vaks

=== Ukrainian Cup ===
15 August 2009 Round of 32	FC Kharkiv	1–5	Karpaty Lviv	Kharkiv
17:00 EEST (UTC+03:00)	Kikot 80'	Report	Khudobyak 29', 32'; Kuznetsov 37' (pen.); Kozhanov 52'; Batista 67'	Stadium: Dynamo Stadium; Attendance: 400; Referee: Yevhen Venger

12 September 2009 Round of 16	Metalurg Donetsk	2–1	Karpaty Lviv	Donetsk
18:00 EEST (UTC+03:00)	Fabinho 18'; Dimitrov 24' (pen.)	Report	Batista 87'	Stadium: Metalurh Stadium; Attendance: 2,500; Referee: Oleh Derevynskyi

== Squad information ==
=== Squad and statistics ===
==== Squad, appearances and goals ====
No.	Pos	Nat	Player	Total		Premier League		Ukrainian Cup	
No.	Pos	Nat	Player	Apps	Goals	Apps	Goals	Apps	Goals
1	GK	(Ukraine) UKR	Yuriy Martyshchuk	1	0	1	0	0	0
4	DF	(Serbia) SRB	Ivan Milošević	28	0	25+1	0	2	0
5	DF	(Serbia) SRB	Nemanja Tubić	23	1	23	1	0	0
7	MF	(Nigeria) NGR	Samson Godwin	23	0	21	0	2	0
8	DF	(Ukraine) UKR	Ihor Oshchypko	24	6	24	6	0	0
9	MF	(Ukraine) UKR	Denys Kozhanov	31	4	29	3	2	1
10	MF	(Georgia (country)) GEO	Alexander Guruli	27	0	10+15	0	1+1	0
11	FW	(Estonia) EST	Sergei Zenjov	26	3	7+18	3	1	0
15	DF	(Ukraine) UKR	Taras Petrivskyi	15	0	11+3	0	1	0
16	MF	(Ukraine) UKR	Ihor Khudobyak (C)	32	7	30	5	2	2
17	MF	(Ukraine) UKR	Oleh Holodyuk	23	3	18+3	3	1+1	0
18	MF	(Ukraine) UKR	Mykhaylo Kopolovets	19	0	10+9	0	0	0
22	GK	(Ukraine) UKR	Andriy Tlumak	31	0	29	0	2	0
24	FW	(Ukraine) UKR	Yuriy Habovda	4	0	0+3	0	0+1	0
25	MF	(Ukraine) UKR	Andriy Tkachuk	28	2	15+13	2	0	0
27	DF	(Ukraine) UKR	Andriy Hurskyi	1	0	0+1	0	0	0
28	MF	(Ukraine) UKR	Volodymyr Bidlovskyi	3	0	0+2	0	0+1	0
30	MF	(Ukraine) UKR	Yaroslav Martynyuk	7	0	1+6	0	0	0
33	DF	(Ukraine) UKR	Yevhen Tarasenko	15	0	12+1	0	2	0
35	FW	(Ukraine) UKR	Yuriy Furta	1	0	0+1	0	0	0
36	FW	(Ukraine) UKR	Volodymyr Hudyma	1	0	0+1	0	0	0
44	DF	(Ukraine) UKR	Artem Fedetskyi	30	7	28	7	2	0
80	FW	(Brazil) BRA	William Batista	28	10	16+10	8	1+1	2
Players away from the club on loan:
79	FW	(Ukraine) UKR	Serhiy Kuznetsov	18	6	16	5	1+1	1
Players featured for Karpaty but left before the end of the season:
13	MF	(Montenegro) MNE	Mladen Kašćelan	4	0	2+1	0	1	0
14	DF	(North Macedonia) MKD	Vlade Lazarevski	3	0	2	0	1	0

==== Goalscorers ====
Place	Position	Nation	Number	Name	Premier League	Ukrainian Cup	Total
1	FW	(Brazil)	80	William Batista	8	2	10
2	DF	(Ukraine)	44	Artem Fedetskyi	7	0	7
2	MF	(Ukraine)	16	Ihor Khudobyak	5	2	7
4	FW	(Ukraine)	79	Serhiy Kuznetsov	5	1	6
4	DF	(Ukraine)	8	Ihor Oshchypko	6	0	6
6	MF	(Ukraine)	9	Denys Kozhanov	3	1	4
7	MF	(Ukraine)	17	Oleh Holodyuk	3	0	3
7	FW	(Estonia)	11	Sergei Zenjov	3	0	3
9	MF	(Ukraine)	25	Andriy Tkachuk	2	0	2
10	DF	(Serbia)	5	Nemanja Tubić	1	0	1
10				Own goal	1	0	1
				TOTALS	44	6	50

==== Disciplinary record ====
Number	Nation	Position	Name	Total		Premier League		Ukrainian Cup	
Number	Nation	Position	Name	Yellow card	Red card	Yellow card	Red card	Yellow card	Red card
4	(Serbia)	DF	Ivan Milošević	4	0	4	0	0	0
5	(Serbia)	DF	Nemanja Tubić	7	0	7	0	0	0
7	(Nigeria)	MF	Samson Godwin	5	2	4	2	1	0
8	(Ukraine)	DF	Ihor Oshchypko	5	0	5	0	0	0
9	(Ukraine)	MF	Denys Kozhanov	4	0	4	0	0	0
11	(Estonia)	FW	Sergei Zenjov	1	0	1	0	0	0
13	(Montenegro)	MF	Mladen Kašćelan	2	0	2	0	0	0
14	(North Macedonia)	DF	Vlade Lazarevski	1	0	0	0	1	0
15	(Ukraine)	DF	Taras Petrivskyi	3	1	3	1	0	0
16	(Ukraine)	MF	Ihor Khudobyak	3	0	3	0	0	0
17	(Ukraine)	MF	Oleh Holodyuk	3	0	3	0	0	0
18	(Ukraine)	MF	Mykhaylo Kopolovets	5	0	5	0	0	0
22	(Ukraine)	GK	Andriy Tlumak	1	0	1	0	0	0
25	(Ukraine)	MF	Andriy Tkachuk	3	1	3	1	0	0
35	(Ukraine)	FW	Yuriy Furta	1	0	1	0	0	0
44	(Ukraine)	DF	Artem Fedetskyi	7	1	6	1	1	0
79	(Ukraine)	FW	Serhiy Kuznetsov	2	0	2	0	0	0
80	(Brazil)	FW	William Batista	2	1	2	1	0	0
			TOTALS	58	6	55	6	3	0

=== Transfers ===
==== In ====
No.	Pos.	Nat.	Name	Age	Moving from	Type	Transfer Window	Contract ends	Transfer fee	Sources
7	MF	(Nigeria)	Samson Godwin	25	(Kazakhstan) Shakhter Karagandy	Loan return	Summer	—	—	
22	GK	(Ukraine)	Andriy Tlumak	30	Zorya Luhansk	End of contract	Summer	May 2012	Free	
9	MF	(Ukraine)	Denys Kozhanov	22	Shakhtar Donetsk	Loan	Summer	May 2011	—	
44	DF	(Ukraine)	Artem Fedetskyi	24	Shakhtar Donetsk	Loan	Summer	May 2011	—	
80	FW	(Brazil)	William Batista	29	(Azerbaijan) FK Baku	End of contract	Summer	May 2012	Free	
14	DF	(North Macedonia)	Vlade Lazarevski	26	(Poland) Polonia Warsaw	Transfer	Summer	May 2011	—	
13	MF	(Montenegro)	Mladen Kašćelan	26	(Poland) ŁKS Łódź	Transfer	Summer	May 2012	—	

==== Out ====
No.	Pos.	Nat	Name	Age	Moving to	Type	Transfer Window	Transfer fee	Sources
1	GK	(Ukraine)	Vsevolod Romanenko	32	Illichivets Mariupol	End of contract	Summer	Free	
19	DF	(Ukraine)	Vasyl Kobin	24	Shakhtar Donetsk	Transfer	Summer	—	
14	DF	(Ukraine)	Serhiy Pshenychnykh	27	Metalist Kharkiv	End of contract	Summer	Free	
13	MF	(Montenegro)	Mladen Kašćelan	26	(Poland) Jagiellonia Białystok	Transfer	Winter	—	
14	DF	(North Macedonia)	Vlade Lazarevski	26	(Croatia) Rijeka	Transfer	Winter	—	
79	FW	(Ukraine)	Serhiy Kuznetsov	27	(Russia) Alania Vladikavkaz	Loan	Winter	—	
