= 2011–12 FC Karpaty Lviv season =

Karpaty Lviv
2011–12 season
- Chairman: (Ukraine) Petro Dyminsky
- Manager: (Ukraine) Yuriy Dyachuk-Stavytskyi
- Stadium: Ukraina Stadium and Arena Lviv, Lviv
- Premier League: 14th
- Ukrainian Cup: Semi-finals
- Europa League: Play-off round
- Top goalscorer: League: Lucas Pérez (6); All: Lucas Pérez (7)
- Highest home attendance: 32,600 vs Dynamo; 10 December 2011
- Lowest home attendance: 4,800 vs Illichivets; 5 November 2011

The 2011–12 FC Karpaty Lviv season was the 49th season in club history.

== Review and events ==
On 8 June 2011 FC Karpaty gathered at club's base for medical inspection after vacations. The club went to two-week training camp in Austrian Alps on 19 June 2011

=== Friendly matches ===
==== Pre-season ====
14 June 2011 Friendly match	Karpaty Lviv	1–0	Skala Stryi	Lviv
17:00	Mazur 6' (o.g.)	Report		Stadium: Ukraina Stadium; Referee: Yuriy Suryak

21 June 2011 Friendly match	Videoton (Hungary)	1–1	Karpaty Lviv	Fulpmes, Austria
18:45	Vasjevic 65'	Report	Leandrinho 61'

23 June 2011 Friendly match	Rapid București (Romania)	1–2	Karpaty Lviv	Zell am See, Austria
14:00	Ciolacu 86'	Report	Lucas 84'; Fedetskyi 90'	Stadium: Alois Latini Stadium

23 June 2011 Friendly match	Fortuna Düsseldorf (Germany)	2–1	Karpaty Lviv	Zell am See, Austria
	Grimaldi 42'; Jovanović 63'	Report	Hudyma 20' (pen.)	Stadium: Alois Latini Stadium

27 June 2011 Friendly match	Zestafoni (Georgia (country))	0–0	Karpaty Lviv	Austria
20:30		Report

28 June 2011 Friendly match	Dynamo Dresden (Germany)	1–2	Karpaty Lviv	Schwaz, Austria
20:30	Trojan 35'	Report	Kopolovets 5'; Zenjov 54'	Attendance: 150

1 July 2011 Friendly match	Universitatea Cluj (Romania)	2–0	Karpaty Lviv	Jenbach, Austria
16:00	Morar 79'; Szilágyi 88'	Report

5 July 2011 Friendly match	Karpaty Lviv	2–0	Naftovyk Okhtyrka	Lviv
17:00	Tanchyk; Pacheco	Report		Stadium: Ukraina Stadium; Attendance: 0

==== Mid-season ====
11 November 2011 Friendly match	Karpaty Lviv	2–0	Prykarpattya Ivano-Frankivsk	Lviv
14:00	Kuznetsov 22'; Balažic 87'	Report		Stadium: Ukraina Stadium; Attendance: 200; Referee: Andriy Hrysyo

==== Winter break ====
20 January 2012 Friendly match	Karpaty Lviv	5–0	Obolon Kyiv	Lviv
	Eric (pen.); Oshchypko (pen.) ?	Report		Stadium: Ukraina Stadium

27 January 2012 Friendly match	Jagiellonia Białystok (Poland)	2–6	Karpaty Lviv	Antalya, Turkey
15:00	Rasiak 20'; Frankowski 44'	Report	Hudyma 47'; Kasyan 57', 86'; Lucas 73'; Eric 76', 84' (pen.)

31 January 2012 Friendly match	Dinamo București (Romania)	0–2	Karpaty Lviv	Belek, Turkey
15:00		Report	Lucas 68', 82'	Stadium: IC Santai Otel Futbol Sahaları

3 February 2012 Friendly match	Spartak Nalchik (Russia)	0–2	Karpaty Lviv	Antalya, Turkey
17:00		Report	Kasyan 25'; Černych 90'

16 February 2012 Friendly match	Vojvodina (Serbia)	1–0	Karpaty Lviv	Antalya, Turkey
15:30	Katai 50'	Report

18 February 2012 Friendly match	Illichivets Mariupol	1–0	Karpaty Lviv	Çolaklı, Turkey
15:30	Okriashvili 40'	Report		Stadium: pitch of Selin Kamelya Hotel

20 February 2012 Friendly match	Ventspils (Latvia)	1–1	Karpaty Lviv	Antalya, Turkey
16:00	Smirnov 13'	Report	Eric 68' (pen.)

24 February 2012 Friendly match	Vorskla Poltava	0–1	Karpaty Lviv	Antalya, Turkey
15:30		Report	Hladkyy 13'

=== Premier League ===
==== League table ====
Pos	Team	Pld	W	D	L	GF	GA	GD	Pts	Qualification or relegation
12	Volyn Lutsk	30	7	6	17	25	43	−18	27	
13	Zorya Luhansk	30	6	8	16	34	58	−24	26	
14	Karpaty Lviv	30	5	8	17	27	51	−24	23 (Note: On 12 August 2010, the Football Federation of Ukraine punished Metalist Kharkiv and Karpaty Lviv for fixing a match in 2008; both teams were handed a fine and deducted nine points each. The FFU then released a statement on 19 October 2010 that the point deductions will be applied for the 2011–12 season. However, Karpaty Lviv have indicated that they will take the matter to the Court of Arbitration for Sport (CAS) at Lausanne. No action had been taken through the season nor of any decision by the league. On 2 August 2013 CAS acknowledged the fact of game fixing between Karpaty and Metalist in 2008. The court did not approve points deduction for both of the clubs, yet suggested to have Metalist stripped of its bronze awards for the 2007–08 Ukrainian Premier League and number of players and staff from both clubs were posed penalties and fines for involvement in the game fixing. On 6 August 2013 UEFA suspended advancement of Metalist Kharkiv in the 2013–14 UEFA Champions League to the playoff round until its final decision on 13 August 2013.)	
15	Obolon Kyiv (R)	30	4	9	17	17	42	−25	21	Relegation to Ukrainian First League
16	PFC Oleksandriya (R)	30	4	8	18	24	58	−34	20	Relegation to Ukrainian First League

Source: uafootball.net.ua
Rules for classification: 1st points; 2nd goal difference; 3rd goals scored; 4th fair play
(R) Relegated

==== Results summary ====
Overall								Home						Away					
Pld	W	D	L	GF	GA	GD	Pts	W	D	L	GF	GA	GD	W	D	L	GF	GA	GD
30	5	8	17	27	51	−24	23	4	3	8	13	23	−10	1	5	9	14	28	−14

==== Matches ====
9 July 2011 1	Illichivets Mariupol	1–0	Karpaty Lviv	Mariupol
17:00	Yaroshenko 7'	Report		Stadium: Illichivets Stadium; Attendance: 9,500; Referee: Serhiy Lysenchuk

17 July 2011 2	Karpaty Lviv	1–1	Chornomorets Odesa	Lviv
17:00	Lucas 18'	Report	Didenko 44'	Stadium: Ukraina Stadium; Attendance: 13,000; Referee: Vitaliy Romanov

24 July 2011 3	Shakhtar Donetsk	2–1	Karpaty Lviv	Donetsk
19:00	Willian 50'; Teixeira 79'	Report	Avelar 38'	Stadium: Donbas Arena; Attendance: 40,341; Referee: Serhiy Boyko

31 July 2011 4	Karpaty Lviv	0–2	Vorskla Poltava	Lviv
19:00		Report	Markoski 3'; Sachko 60'	Stadium: Ukraina Stadium; Attendance: 8,000; Referee: Anatoliy Abdula

7 August 2011 5	Dynamo Kyiv	2–0	Karpaty Lviv	Kyiv
19:30	Shevchenko 34'; Vukojević 55'	Report		Stadium: Valeriy Lobanovskyi Dynamo Stadium; Attendance: 14,200; Referee: Yuriy Moseychuk

13 August 2011 6	Karpaty Lviv	2–1	Zorya Luhansk	Lviv
19:00	Lucas 40', 42'	Report	Balažic 38' (o.g.)	Stadium: Ukraina Stadium; Attendance: 6,000; Referee: Oleh Derevynskyi

21 August 2011 7	Tavriya Simferopol	1–1	Karpaty Lviv	Simferopol
19:00	Kalynychenko 33'	Report	Lucas 78'	Stadium: Lokomotyv Stadium; Attendance: 7,800; Referee: Oleksandr Derdo

28 August 2011 8	Karpaty Lviv	1–2	Metalist Kharkiv	Lviv
20:00	Cristóbal 83'	Report	Xavier 31'; Dević 89'	Stadium: Ukraina Stadium; Attendance: 5,800; Referee: Viktor Shvetsov

10 September 2011 9	PFC Oleksandriya	1–1	Karpaty Lviv	Oleksandriya
19:00	Kabanov 72'	Report	Batista 51'	Stadium: Nika Stadium; Attendance: 5,500; Referee: Yevhen Aranovskyi

17 September 2011 10	Karpaty Lviv	0–0	Obolon Kyiv	Lviv
18:30		Report		Stadium: Ukraina Stadium; Attendance: 6,000; Referee: Yuriy Moseychuk

26 September 2011 11	Metalurh Donetsk	2–1	Karpaty Lviv	Donetsk
19:45	Sérgio 81', 90'	Report	Milošević 3'	Stadium: Metalurh Stadium; Attendance: 1,500; Referee: Anatoliy Abdula

1 October 2011 12	Volyn Lutsk	0–2	Karpaty Lviv	Lutsk
19:30		Report	Holodyuk 26'; Zenjov 51'	Stadium: Avanhard Stadium; Attendance: 8,000; Referee: Serhiy Boyko

16 October 2011 13	Karpaty Lviv	0–3	Arsenal Kyiv	Lviv
16:00		Report	Odibe 7'; Mazilu 66', 74'	Stadium: Ukraina Stadium; Attendance: 5,000; Referee: Viktor Shvetsov

22 October 2011 14	Kryvbas Kryvyi Rih	1–1	Karpaty Lviv	Kryvyi Rih
17:30	Samodin 39'	Report	Milošević 50'	Stadium: Metalurh Stadium; Attendance: 9,000; Referee: Yaroslav Kozyk

30 October 2011 15	Karpaty Lviv	0–2	Dnipro Dnipropetrovsk	Lviv
18:30		Report	Kalinić 3'; Kravchenko 82'	Stadium: Ukraina Stadium; Attendance: 10,600; Referee: Oleh Derevynskyi

5 November 2011 16	Karpaty Lviv	3–0	Illichivets Mariupol	Lviv
16:00	Fedetskyi 1'; Kuznetsov 13', 69'	Report		Stadium: Ukraina Stadium; Attendance: 4,800; Referee: Serhiy Boyko

19 November 2011 17	Chornomorets Odesa	2–2	Karpaty Lviv	Odesa
18:30	Balashov 45+1' (pen.); França 81'	Report	Batista 65'; Fedetskyi 84'	Stadium: Chornomorets Stadium; Attendance: 31,060; Referee: Anatoliy Zhabchenko

27 November 2011 18	Karpaty Lviv	0–5	Shakhtar Donetsk	Lviv
16:00		Report	Douglas Costa 23' (pen.); Fernandinho 58' (pen.); Seleznyov 65', 67'; Mkhitaryan 75'	Stadium: Ukraina Stadium; Attendance: 15,000; Referee: Yuriy Vaks

4 December 2011 19	Vorskla Poltava	1–1	Karpaty Lviv	Poltava
15:30	Bezus 37'	Report	Batista 56'	Stadium: Butovsky Vorskla Stadium; Attendance: 1,500; Referee: Yevhen Aranovskyi

10 December 2011 20	Karpaty Lviv	0–1	Dynamo Kyiv	Lviv
16:00		Report	Ideye 88'	Stadium: Arena Lviv; Attendance: 32,600; Referee: Anatoliy Abdula

3 March 2012 21	Zorya Luhansk	5–1	Karpaty Lviv	Luhansk
13:30	Kamenyuka 25', 54', 65'; Rodić 60'; Galyuza 80'	Report	Hladkyy 87'	Stadium: Avanhard Stadium; Attendance: 8,000; Referee: Yevhen Aranovskyi

11 March 2012 22	Karpaty Lviv	2–3	Tavriya Simferopol	Lviv
15:30	Lucas 36'; Kasyan 48'	Report	Nazarenko 62' (pen.); Hirskyi 70' (o.g.); Shynder 76'	Stadium: Arena Lviv; Attendance: 12,500; Referee: Yuriy Moseychuk

19 March 2012 23	Metalist Kharkiv	3–1	Karpaty Lviv	Kharkiv
19:00	Cristaldo 31', 64'; Berezovchuk 47'	Report	Fedetskyi 53'	Stadium: Metalist Stadium; Attendance: 28,806; Referee: Serhiy Boyko

25 March 2012 24	Karpaty Lviv	1–1	PFC Oleksandriya	Lviv
19:30	Lucas 68'	Report	Dovhyi 90'	Stadium: Arena Lviv; Attendance: 11,800; Referee: Yuriy Vaks

31 March 2012 25	Obolon Kyiv	2–0	Karpaty Lviv	Kyiv
18:30	Hurskyi 6'; Mandzyuk 29'	Report		Stadium: Obolon Arena; Attendance: 4,000; Referee: Viktor Shvetsov

7 April 2012 26	Karpaty Lviv	0–2	Metalurh Donetsk	Lviv
17:30		Report	Lazić 34'; Checher 50'	Stadium: Arena Lviv; Attendance: 6,950; Referee: Anatoliy Abdula

16 April 2012 27	Karpaty Lviv	1–0	Volyn Lutsk	Lviv
17:00	Hladkyy 72'	Report		Stadium: Ukraina Stadium; Attendance: 7,000; Referee: Serhiy Dankovskyi

22 April 2012 28	Arsenal Kyiv	3–2	Karpaty Lviv	Kyiv
15:30	Shatskikh 54', 57' (pen.); Kobakhidze 82'	Report	Avelar 8'; Hladkyy 51'	Stadium: Valeriy Lobanovskyi Dynamo Stadium; Attendance: 5,828; Referee: Vitaliy Hodulyan

2 May 2012 29	Karpaty Lviv	2–0	Kryvbas Kryvyi Rih	Lviv
19:00	Kopolovets 57'; Kasyan 83' (pen.)	Report		Stadium: Ukraina Stadium; Attendance: 8,700; Referee: Kostyantyn Trukhanov

10 May 2012 30	Dnipro Dnipropetrovsk	2–0	Karpaty Lviv	Dnipropetrovsk
19:00	Strinić 68'; Oliynyk 87'	Report		Stadium: Dnipro Arena; Attendance: 15,170; Referee: Viktor Shvetsov

=== Ukrainian Cup ===
21 September 2011 Round of 32	FC Poltava	0–1	Karpaty Lviv	Poltava
15:30		Report	Borja 73'	Stadium: Lokomotiv Stadium; Attendance: 2,500; Referee: Ivan Bondar

26 October 2011 Round of 16	Karpaty Lviv	1–0	Metalist Kharkiv	Lviv
20:00	Zenjov 59'	Report		Stadium: Ukraina Stadium; Attendance: 27,000; Referee: Serhiy Dankovskyi

11 April 2012 Quarter-finals	Karpaty Lviv	2–1	Chornomorets Odesa	Lviv
20:00	Hladkyy 8'; Avelar 71'	Report	Bakaj 84'	Stadium: Ukraina Stadium; Attendance: 18,500; Referee: Oleksandr Ivanov

28 April 2012 Semi-finals	Metalurh Donetsk	0–0 (7–6 p)	Karpaty Lviv	Donetsk
18:30		Report		Stadium: Metalurh Stadium; Attendance: 3,600; Referee: Yuriy Moseychuk
	Penalties
	Danilo (penalty scored); Ghazaryan (penalty scored); China (penalty scored); Mkrtchyan (penalty missed); Volovyk (penalty scored); Pryima (penalty scored); Morozyuk (penalty scored); Ivanko (penalty scored)		(penalty scored) Kasyan; (penalty missed) Tkachuk; (penalty scored) Avelar; (penalty scored) Lucas; (penalty scored) Fedetskyi; (penalty scored) Khudobyak; (penalty scored) Kopolovets; (penalty missed) Milošević

=== UEFA Europa League ===
==== Qualifying rounds ====
28 July 2011 3rd qualifying round. 1st leg	Karpaty Lviv	2–0	(Republic of Ireland) St Patrick's Athletic	Lviv
19:30 EEST (UTC+3)	Fedetskyi 34'; Varankow 90+3'	Report		Stadium: Ukraina Stadium; Attendance: 13,000; Referee: Martin Strömbergsson (Sweden)

4 August 2011 3rd qualifying round. 2nd leg	St Patrick's Athletic (Republic of Ireland)	1–3 (1–5 agg.)	Karpaty Lviv	Dublin, Ireland
19:45 WEST (UTC+1)	McMillan 57'	Report	Zenjov 22'; Khudobyak 64'; Oshchypko 83'	Stadium: Tallaght Stadium; Attendance: 2,109; Referee: Ovidiu Haţegan (Romania)

18 August 2011 Play-off round. 1st leg	PAOK (Greece)	2–0	Karpaty Lviv	Thessaloniki, Greece
21:00 EEST (UTC+3)	Athanasiadis 15'; Lino 56'	Report		Stadium: Toumba Stadium; Attendance: 21,424; Referee: Robert Malek (Poland)

25 August 2011 Play-off round. 2nd leg	Karpaty Lviv	1–1 (1–3 agg.)	(Greece) PAOK	Lviv
22:00 EEST (UTC+3)	Lucas 45' (pen.)	Report	Balafas 55'	Stadium: Ukraina Stadium; Attendance: 20,000; Referee: Fredy Fautrel (France)

== Squad information ==
=== Squad and statistics ===
==== Squad, appearances and goals ====
No.	Pos	Nat	Player	Total		Premier League		Ukrainian Cup		Europa League	
No.	Pos	Nat	Player	Apps	Goals	Apps	Goals	Apps	Goals	Apps	Goals
4	DF	(Serbia) SRB	Ivan Milošević	30	2	25	2	3	0	2	0
7	MF	(Ukraine) UKR	Pavlo Ksyonz	8	0	5+2	0	1	0	0	0
8	DF	(Ukraine) UKR	Ihor Oshchypko	25	1	17+3	0	1	0	4	1
10	FW	(Ukraine) UKR	Oleksandr Hladkyy	10	4	5+3	3	2	1	0	0
11	FW	(Estonia) EST	Sergei Zenjov	22	3	11+6	1	1+1	1	3	1
14	FW	(Belarus) BLR	Andrey Varankow	9	1	1+4	0	1	0	0+3	1
15	DF	(Ukraine) UKR	Taras Petrivskyi	9	0	6+3	0	0	0	0	0
16	MF	(Ukraine) UKR	Ihor Khudobyak	30	1	21+2	0	3	0	4	1
17	MF	(Ukraine) UKR	Oleh Holodyuk	24	1	15+3	1	2+2	0	2	0
18	FW	(Ukraine) UKR	Mykhaylo Kopolovets	25	1	11+9	1	1+2	0	1+1	0
19	MF	(Ukraine) UKR	Yaroslav Martynyuk	14	0	8+4	0	0	0	1+1	0
21	DF	(Slovenia) SLO	Gregor Balažic	25	0	18+1	0	4	0	2	0
22	GK	(Ukraine) UKR	Andriy Tlumak	22	0	18	0	2	0	2	0
25	MF	(Ukraine) UKR	Andriy Tkachuk	36	0	27+1	0	4	0	4	0
27	MF	(Brazil) BRA	Eric Pereira	6	0	5+1	0	0	0	0	0
28	FW	(Ukraine) UKR	Oleksandr Kasyan	9	2	5+3	2	0+1	0	0	0
30	MF	(Ukraine) UKR	Kostyantyn Kravchenko	5	0	1+2	0	0	0	0+2	0
31	FW	(Ukraine) UKR	Ilya Mikhalyov	3	0	1+1	0	0+1	0	0	0
32	GK	(North Macedonia) MKD	Martin Bogatinov	16	0	12	0	2	0	2	0
36	FW	(Ukraine) UKR	Volodymyr Hudyma	2	0	0+2	0	0	0	0	0
41	DF	(Ukraine) UKR	Stepan Hirskyi	11	0	7+2	0	2	0	0	0
43	DF	(Ukraine) UKR	Ihor Ozarkiv	11	0	3+7	0	1	0	0	0
44	DF	(Ukraine) UKR	Artem Fedetskyi	32	4	23+1	3	3+1	0	4	1
47	DF	(Moldova) MDA	Vadim Bolohan	5	0	5	0	0	0	0	0
50	DF	(Ukraine) UKR	Volodymyr Kostevych	1	0	1	0	0	0	0	0
77	FW	(Spain) ESP	Lucas Pérez	34	7	23+3	6	2+2	0	4	1
79	FW	(Ukraine) UKR	Serhiy Kuznetsov	4	2	2+1	2	1	0	0	0
80	FW	(Brazil) BRA	William Batista	12	3	5+6	3	0	0	1	0
89	DF	(Brazil) BRA	Danilo Avelar	8	3	5	2	2	1	1	0
99	MF	(Georgia (country)) GEO	Murtaz Daushvili	10	0	9	0	1	0	0	0
Players away from the club on loan:
9	MF	(Spain) ESP	Cristóbal Márquez	12	1	3+4	1	1	0	2+2	0
10	MF	(Georgia (country)) GEO	Alexander Guruli	8	0	4+3	0	1	0	0	0
20	DF	(Spain) ESP	Borja Gómez	24	1	18	0	2	1	4	0
Players featured for Karpaty but left before the end of the season:
7	MF	(Nigeria) NGR	Samson Godwin	8	0	6+2	0	0	0	0	0
9	MF	(Estonia) EST	Tarmo Kink	5	0	1+4	0	0	0	0	0
99	FW	(Argentina) ARG	Germán Pacheco	11	0	3+3	0	1	0	1+3	0

==== Goalscorers ====
Place	Position	Nation	Number	Name	Premier League	Ukrainian Cup	Europa League	Total
1	FW	(Spain)	77	Lucas Pérez	6	0	1	7
2	DF	(Ukraine)	44	Artem Fedetskyi	3	0	1	4
2	FW	(Ukraine)	10	Oleksandr Hladkyy	3	1	0	4
4	FW	(Estonia)	11	Sergei Zenjov	1	1	1	3
4	FW	(Brazil)	80	William Batista	3	0	0	3
4	DF	(Brazil)	89	Danilo Avelar	2	1	0	3
7	DF	(Serbia)	4	Ivan Milošević	2	0	0	2
7	FW	(Ukraine)	79	Serhiy Kuznetsov	2	0	0	2
7	FW	(Ukraine)	28	Oleksandr Kasyan	2	0	0	2
10	FW	(Belarus)	14	Andrey Varankow	0	0	1	1
10	MF	(Ukraine)	16	Ihor Khudobyak	0	0	1	1
10	DF	(Ukraine)	8	Ihor Oshchypko	0	0	1	1
10	MF	(Spain)	9	Cristóbal Márquez	1	0	0	1
10	DF	(Spain)	20	Borja Gómez	0	1	0	1
10	MF	(Ukraine)	17	Oleh Holodyuk	1	0	0	1
10	FW	(Ukraine)	18	Mykhaylo Kopolovets	1	0	0	1
				TOTALS	27	4	6	37

==== Disciplinary record ====
Number	Nation	Position	Name	Total		Premier League		Ukrainian Cup		Europa League	
Number	Nation	Position	Name	Yellow card	Red card	Yellow card	Red card	Yellow card	Red card	Yellow card	Red card
4	(Serbia)	DF	Ivan Milošević	9	0	7	0	1	0	1	0
7	(Nigeria)	MF	Samson Godwin	2	0	2	0	0	0	0	0
7	(Ukraine)	MF	Pavlo Ksyonz	1	0	1	0	0	0	0	0
8	(Ukraine)	DF	Ihor Oshchypko	6	0	6	0	0	0	0	0
10	(Ukraine)	FW	Oleksandr Hladkyy	4	0	3	0	1	0	0	0
11	(Estonia)	FW	Sergei Zenjov	3	0	1	0	0	0	2	0
14	(Belarus)	FW	Andrey Varankow	1	0	0	0	0	0	1	0
15	(Ukraine)	DF	Taras Petrivskyi	2	0	2	0	0	0	0	0
16	(Ukraine)	MF	Ihor Khudobyak	1	0	1	0	0	0	0	0
17	(Ukraine)	MF	Oleh Holodyuk	8	0	8	0	0	0	0	0
18	(Ukraine)	FW	Mykhaylo Kopolovets	7	2	6	2	1	0	0	0
19	(Ukraine)	MF	Yaroslav Martynyuk	6	0	5	0	0	0	1	0
20	(Spain)	DF	Borja Gómez	5	0	3	0	1	0	1	0
21	(Slovenia)	DF	Gregor Balažic	9	1	8	1	1	0	0	0
22	(Ukraine)	GK	Andriy Tlumak	3	0	2	0	1	0	0	0
25	(Ukraine)	MF	Andriy Tkachuk	7	0	6	0	0	0	1	0
27	(Brazil)	MF	Eric Pereira	2	0	2	0	0	0	0	0
28	(Ukraine)	FW	Oleksandr Kasyan	2	0	1	0	1	0	0	0
30	(Ukraine)	MF	Kostyantyn Kravchenko	1	0	1	0	0	0	0	0
41	(Ukraine)	DF	Stepan Hirskyi	3	1	2	0	1	1	0	0
43	(Ukraine)	DF	Ihor Ozarkiv	2	0	1	0	1	0	0	0
44	(Ukraine)	DF	Artem Fedetskyi	11	1	8	0	1	0	2	1
47	(Moldova)	DF	Vadim Bolohan	2	0	2	0	0	0	0	0
77	(Spain)	FW	Lucas Pérez	9	0	7	0	1	0	1	0
80	(Brazil)	FW	William Batista	3	1	3	1	0	0	0	0
89	(Brazil)	DF	Danilo Avelar	2	1	1	1	1	0	0	0
99	(Argentina)	FW	Germán Pacheco	1	0	1	0	0	0	0	0
99	(Georgia (country))	MF	Murtaz Daushvili	3	0	2	0	1	0	0	0
			TOTALS	115	7	92	5	13	1	10	1

=== Transfers ===
==== In ====
No.	Pos.	Nat.	Name	Age	Moving from	Type	Transfer Window	Contract ends	Transfer fee	Sources
89	DF	(Brazil)	Danilo Avelar	22	(Germany) Schalke	Loan return	Summer	31 December 2012	Free	
14	FW	(Belarus)	Andrey Varankow	22	Dynamo Kyiv	Loan	Summer	2012	—	
99	FW	(Argentina)	Germán Pacheco	20	(Spain) Atlético Madrid B	End of contract	Summer	2015	Free	
9	MF	(Spain)	Cristóbal Márquez	27	(Spain) Villarreal CF	—	Summer	2014	—	
30	MF	(Ukraine)	Kostyantyn Kravchenko	24	Shakhtar Donetsk	Loan	Summer	—	—	
29	GK	(Ukraine)	Oleksandr Ilyuschenkov	21	Enerhetyk Burshtyn	—	Summer	—	—	
3	DF	(Brazil)	Murilo Gomes	21	(Brazil) Palmeiras B	Loan	Summer	—	—	
7	MF	(Nigeria)	Samson Godwin	27	Volyn Lutsk	Loan return	Summer	—	Free	
27	MF	(Brazil)	Eric Pereira	25	(Romania) Gaz Metan Medias	—	Summer	—	—	
10	FW	(Ukraine)	Oleksandr Hladkyy	24	Dnipro Dnipropetrovsk	Loan	Winter	May 2012	—	
28	FW	(Ukraine)	Oleksandr Kasyan	23	Shakhtar Donetsk	Transfer	Winter	2016	—	
31	FW	(Ukraine)	Ilya Mikhalyov	21	(Russia) Amkar Perm	—	Winter	2017	—	
47	DF	(Moldova)	Vadim Bolohan	25	(Moldova) Milsami Orhei	—	Winter	2015	—	
9	MF	(Estonia)	Tarmo Kink	26	(England) Middlesbrough	End of contract	Winter	May 2012	Free	
99	MF	(Georgia (country))	Murtaz Daushvili	22	(Georgia (country)) Zestafoni	Loan	Winter	December 2012	—	
7	MF	(Ukraine)	Pavlo Ksyonz	25	FC Oleksandria	—	Winter	May 2016	—	

==== Out ====
No.	Pos.	Nat	Name	Age	Moving to	Type	Transfer Window	Transfer fee	Sources
1	GK	(Ukraine)	Vitaliy Rudenko	30	Metalurh Zaporizhya	Released	Summer	Free	
20	DF	(Spain)	Borja Gómez	23	(Spain) Granada CF	Loan	Winter	—	
9	MF	(Spain)	Cristóbal Márquez	27	(Spain) Elche CF	Loan	Winter	—	
10	MF	(Georgia (country))	Alexander Guruli	26	(Georgia (country)) Dila Gori	Loan	Winter	—	
23	GK	(Ukraine)	Roman Mysak	20	Krymteplytsia Molodizhne	Loan	Winter	—	
9	MF	(Estonia)	Tarmo Kink	26	(Italy) Varese	Released	—	Free	

=== Managerial changes ===
Outgoing head coach	Manner of departure	Date of vacancy	Table	Incoming head coach	Date of appointment
(Belarus) Oleg Kononov	Resigned	18 October	14th	(Russia) Pavel Kucherov (interim)	18 October
(Russia) Pavel Kucherov (interim)	End as interim	21 January	13th	(Ukraine) Volodymyr Sharan	21 January
(Ukraine) Volodymyr Sharan	Sacked	25 March	14th	(Ukraine) Yuriy Dyachuk-Stavytskyi (interim)	25 March
