= List of Ukrainian football transfers winter 2010–11 =

This is a list of Ukrainian football transfers in the winter transfer window 2010–2011 by club. Only transfers of the Premier League are included.

== Premier League ==
=== FC Arsenal Kyiv ===
In: Note: Flags indicate national team as defined under FIFA eligibility rules; some limited exceptions apply. Players may hold more than one non-FIFA nationality.

No.	Pos.	Nation	Player
--	FW	UKR	Oleksandr Kovpak (free agent, 3-yrs)
--	MF	UKR	Volodymyr Arzhanov (from Metalurh Zaporizhia)
--	MF	UKR	Volodymyr Polyovyi (from Metalurh Zaporizhia)
--	MF	RUS	Roland Gusev (free agent, loan-to-contract)
--	GK		Vladyslav Chanhelia (from Nyva Vinnytsia)

Out: Note: Flags indicate national team as defined under FIFA eligibility rules; some limited exceptions apply. Players may hold more than one non-FIFA nationality.

No.	Pos.	Nation	Player
--	MF	CRO	Mladen Bartulović (loan return to Dnipro Dnipropetrovsk)
--	DF	UKR	Yevhen Yevseyev (on loan to Volyn Lutsk)

=== FC Dnipro Dnipropetrovsk ===
In: Note: Flags indicate national team as defined under FIFA eligibility rules; some limited exceptions apply. Players may hold more than one non-FIFA nationality.

No.	Pos.	Nation	Player
—	GK	UKR	Yevhen Borovyk (loan return from Kryvbas)
—	DF	LTU	Linas Klimavicius (loan return from Kryvbas)
—	DF	UKR	Denys Andriyenko (loan return from Kryvbas)
—	MF	GEO	Beka Gotsiridze (loan return from Kryvbas)
—	MF	UKR	Oleksandr Maksymov (loan return from Kryvbas)
—	DF	UKR	Vitaly Lysytsky (loan return from Kryvbas)
—	FW	UKR	Vitaliy Kaverin (loan return from Kryvbas)
—	GK	GEO	Aleqsandr Kobakhidze (loan return from Kryvbas)
99	FW	BRA	Matheus (from S.C. Braga, 3.5yrs)
—	MF	CRO	Mladen Bartulović (loan return from Arsenal Kyiv)
8	MF	BRA	Giuliano (from Internacional, 5yrs)
2	DF	GHA	Samuel Inkoom (from Basel, 4yrs)
—	DF	CRO	Ivan Strinić (from Hajduk Split)
—	DF	COL	Nelson Rivas (on loan from Internazionale)

Out: Note: Flags indicate national team as defined under FIFA eligibility rules; some limited exceptions apply. Players may hold more than one non-FIFA nationality.

No.	Pos.	Nation	Player
—	MF	RUS	Rolan Gusev (free agent)

=== FC Dynamo Kyiv ===
In: Note: Flags indicate national team as defined under FIFA eligibility rules; some limited exceptions apply. Players may hold more than one non-FIFA nationality.

No.	Pos.	Nation	Player
--	MF	UKR	Kyrylo Petrov (loan return from Kryvbas)
--	FW	BLR	Andrey Varankow (loan return from Kryvbas)
--	MF	UKR	Oleksandr Aliyev (from Lokomotiv Moscow)

Out: Note: Flags indicate national team as defined under FIFA eligibility rules; some limited exceptions apply. Players may hold more than one non-FIFA nationality.

No.	Pos.	Nation	Player
--	MF	UKR	Andriy Oberemko (to Vorskla Poltava)
--	DF	UKR	Oleh Dopilka (on loan to FC Sevastopol)
--	FW	BRA	André (on loan to Bordeaux)

=== FC Illichivets Mariupol ===
In: Note: Flags indicate national team as defined under FIFA eligibility rules; some limited exceptions apply. Players may hold more than one non-FIFA nationality.

No.	Pos.	Nation	Player
--	DF	UKR	Dmytro Nevmyvaka (free agent, from Metalurh Z.)
--	GK	UKR	Bohdan Shust (on loan from Shakhtar Donetsk)
--	DF	UKR	Stanislav Mykytsey (on loan from Shakhtar Donetsk)
--	MF	UKR	Ihor Chaykovskyi (on loan from Shakhtar Donetsk)
--	FW	UKR	Yehor Kartushov (on loan from Shakhtar Donetsk)
--	GK	UKR	Mykyta Shevchenko (from Shakhtar Donetsk)
--	DF	UKR	Ivan Ordets (on loan from Shakhtar Donetsk)
--	MF	UKR	Dmytro Hrechyshkin (on loan from Shakhtar Donetsk)
--	MF	UKR	Vitaliy Fedotov (on loan from Shakhtar Donetsk)
--	FW	UKR	Pylyp Budkivskiy (on loan from Shakhtar Donetsk)

Out: Note: Flags indicate national team as defined under FIFA eligibility rules; some limited exceptions apply. Players may hold more than one non-FIFA nationality.

No.	Pos.	Nation	Player
1	GK	UKR	Vsevolod Romanenko (free agent to Volyn Lutsk)
--	FW	GEO	Giorgi Gabedava (loan return to Gagra)
--	GK	UKR	Vadym Deonas (free agent)
--	DF	LTU	Mantas Samusiovas (free agent)
--	MF	UKR	Ivan Kozoriz (free agent)
--	MF	UKR	Vadym Melnyk (free agent)
--	MF	UKR	Artur Siryk (free agent)
--	DF	UKR	Ihor Chuchman (free agent)

=== FC Karpaty Lviv ===
In: Note: Flags indicate national team as defined under FIFA eligibility rules; some limited exceptions apply. Players may hold more than one non-FIFA nationality.

No.	Pos.	Nation	Player
--	FW	ESP	Lucas Pérez Martínez (from Rayo Vallecano)
--	GK	MKD	Martin Bogatinov (from Rabotnički)
--	DF	SVN	Gregor Balažic (from Gorica)
--	MF	ROU	Răzvan Cociş (on loan from Al Nassr)

Out: Note: Flags indicate national team as defined under FIFA eligibility rules; some limited exceptions apply. Players may hold more than one non-FIFA nationality.

No.	Pos.	Nation	Player
--	DF	UKR	Vyacheslav Checher (loan return to Metalurh D.)
--	MF	BRA	Danilo Avelar (loaned to Schalke 04)
--	MF	UKR	Hryhoriy Baranets (to Obolon Kyiv)
--	MF	UKR	Borys Baranets (to Obolon Kyiv)
--	DF	UKR	Yevhen Tarasenko (free agent)
--	MF	UKR	Andriy Sahaidak (on loan to Chornomorets Odesa)

=== FC Kryvbas Kryvyi Rih ===
In: Note: Flags indicate national team as defined under FIFA eligibility rules; some limited exceptions apply. Players may hold more than one non-FIFA nationality.

No.	Pos.	Nation	Player
--	FW	CZE	Jiří Jeslínek (from Sparta Praha)
--	MF	SVN	Darijan Matič (from Bnei Sakhnin)

Out: Note: Flags indicate national team as defined under FIFA eligibility rules; some limited exceptions apply. Players may hold more than one non-FIFA nationality.

No.	Pos.	Nation	Player
--	GK	UKR	Yevhen Borovyk (loan return from Dnipro)
--	DF	LTU	Linas Klimavicius (loan return from Dnipro)
--	DF	UKR	Denys Andriyenko (loan return from Dnipro)
--	MF	GEO	Beka Gotsiridze (loan return from Dnipro)
--	MF	UKR	Oleksandr Maksymov (loan return from Dnipro)
--	DF	UKR	Vitaly Lysytsky (loan return from Dnipro)
--	FW	UKR	Vitaliy Kaverin (loan return from Dnipro)
--	GK	GEO	Aleqsandr Kobakhidze (loan return to Dnipro)
--	MF	UKR	Kyrylo Petrov (loan return to Dynamo Kyiv)
--	FW	BLR	Andrey Varankow (loan return to Dynamo Kyiv)
--	MF	UKR	Dmytro Khomchenovskiy (loan return to FC Olimpik Donetsk)

=== FC Metalist Kharkiv ===
In: Note: Flags indicate national team as defined under FIFA eligibility rules; some limited exceptions apply. Players may hold more than one non-FIFA nationality.

No.	Pos.	Nation	Player
28	DF	UKR	Oleksiy Kurylov (loan return from Tavriya)
--	MF	ARG	Sebastián Blanco (from Lanus (8.7 mln euros))
--	FW	ARG	Jonathan Cristaldo (from Vélez Sarsfield (6 mln euros))
71	MF	RUS	Sergei Tkachyov (from Krylia Sovetov Samara)
27	MF	UKR	Yurіy Chonka (from S.C.Beregvidek)

Out: Note: Flags indicate national team as defined under FIFA eligibility rules; some limited exceptions apply. Players may hold more than one non-FIFA nationality.

No.	Pos.	Nation	Player
--	DF	UKR	Yevhen Selin (to Vorskla Poltava)
--	MF	POL	Marcin Burkhardt (to Jagiellonia Białystok)
--	DF	UKR	Oleksiy Kurylov (on loan to Vorskla Poltava)
--	FW	UKR	Serhiy Davydov (to Zakarpattia Uzhhorod)
--	MF	NGA	Sani Kaita (on loan to Iraklis (AS Monaco))

=== FC Metalurh Donetsk ===
In: Note: Flags indicate national team as defined under FIFA eligibility rules; some limited exceptions apply. Players may hold more than one non-FIFA nationality.

No.	Pos.	Nation	Player
--	MF	UKR	Denys Holaido (free agent from Tavria)
--	GK	UKR	Oleksandr Bandura (from Krymteplytsia)
--	DF	UKR	Vyacheslav Checher (loan return from Karpaty Lviv)
--	MF	UKR	Vitaliy Havrysh (loan return from Stal Alchevsk)
--	FW	UKR	Ihor Tymchenko (loan return from Vorskla Poltava)
--	MF	BUL	Chavdar Yankov (loan return from Rostov)
--	MF	ARM	Ararat Arakelyan (loan return from Banants)
--	MF	POR	Ricardo Fernandes (from Hapoel Be'er Sheva)
--	FW	NGA	Fanendo Adi (from AS Trenčín)
--	FW	BRA	Júnior Moraes (from Gloria Bistriţa)

Out: Note: Flags indicate national team as defined under FIFA eligibility rules; some limited exceptions apply. Players may hold more than one non-FIFA nationality.

No.	Pos.	Nation	Player
--	MF	BRA	Cleyton (loan return to Panathinaikos)
--	MF	POR	Filipe Teixeira (to Académica de Coimbra)
--	FW	ZIM	Musawengosi Mguni (to Terek Grozny)

=== FC Metalurh Zaporizhya ===
In: Note: Flags indicate national team as defined under FIFA eligibility rules; some limited exceptions apply. Players may hold more than one non-FIFA nationality.

No.	Pos.	Nation	Player
--	MF	TUN	Achraf (from Stade Tunisien)

Out: Note: Flags indicate national team as defined under FIFA eligibility rules; some limited exceptions apply. Players may hold more than one non-FIFA nationality.

No.	Pos.	Nation	Player
--	DF	UKR	Dmytro Nevmyvaka (free agent, to Illichivets)
--	MF	UKR	Volodymyr Arzhanov (to Arsenal Kyiv)
--	MF	UKR	Volodymyr Polyovyi (to Arsenal Kyiv)
--	FW	NGA	Michael Alozie (to FC Sevastopol)

=== FC Obolon Kyiv ===
In: Note: Flags indicate national team as defined under FIFA eligibility rules; some limited exceptions apply. Players may hold more than one non-FIFA nationality.

No.	Pos.	Nation	Player
--	MF	UKR	Hryhoriy Baranets (from Karpaty Lviv)
--	MF	UKR	Borys Baranets (from Karpaty Lviv)
--	DF	UKR	Oleh Leonidov (from FC Lviv)
--	DF	UKR	Ihor Ilkiv (from FC Lviv)

Out: Note: Flags indicate national team as defined under FIFA eligibility rules; some limited exceptions apply. Players may hold more than one non-FIFA nationality.

No.	Pos.	Nation	Player

=== FC Sevastopol ===
In: Note: Flags indicate national team as defined under FIFA eligibility rules; some limited exceptions apply. Players may hold more than one non-FIFA nationality.

No.	Pos.	Nation	Player
--	MF		Anton Izvekov (loan return from Helios Kharkiv)
--	MF	BUL	Alexandar Mladenov (from Kaliakra Kavarna)
16	GK	BLR	Syarhey Vyeramko (from BATE Borisov)
--	FW	NGA	Michael Alozie (from Metalurh Zaporizhia)
--	FW	MKD	Besart Ibraimi (from Schalke 04)
--	DF	GEO	Mate Ghvinianidze (from 1860 München)
--	DF	UKR	Oleh Dopilka (on loan from Dynamo Kyiv)

Out: Note: Flags indicate national team as defined under FIFA eligibility rules; some limited exceptions apply. Players may hold more than one non-FIFA nationality.

No.	Pos.	Nation	Player
--	GK	UKR	Maryan Marushchak (to Arsenal Bila Tserkva)

=== FC Shakhtar Donetsk ===
In: Note: Flags indicate national team as defined under FIFA eligibility rules; some limited exceptions apply. Players may hold more than one non-FIFA nationality.

No.	Pos.	Nation	Player
--	GK	UKR	Bohdan Shust (loan return from Zorya Luhansk)
--	DF	UKR	Stanislav Mykytsey (loan return from Zorya Luhansk)
--	MF	UKR	Ihor Chaykovskyi (loan return from Zorya Luhansk)
--	FW	UKR	Yehor Kartushov (loan return from Zorya Luhansk)
--	FW	MEX	Nery Castillo (loan return from Chicago Fire)
--	FW	UKR	Artur Novotryasov (on loan from Krymteplytsia Molodizhne)

Out: Note: Flags indicate national team as defined under FIFA eligibility rules; some limited exceptions apply. Players may hold more than one non-FIFA nationality.

No.	Pos.	Nation	Player
--	GK	UKR	Bohdan Shust (on loan to Illichivets Mariupol)
--	DF	UKR	Stanislav Mykytsey (on loan to Illichivets Mariupol)
--	MF	UKR	Ihor Chaykovskyi (on loan to Illichivets Mariupol)
--	FW	UKR	Yehor Kartushov (on loan to Illichivets Mariupol)
--	FW	MEX	Nery Castillo (on loan to Aris)
--	DF	BRA	Leonardo (on loan to Avaí)

=== SC Tavriya Simferopol ===
In: Note: Flags indicate national team as defined under FIFA eligibility rules; some limited exceptions apply. Players may hold more than one non-FIFA nationality.

No.	Pos.	Nation	Player
--	GK	SRB	Damir Kahriman (from Javor Ivanjica)
--	MF	POL	Piotr Klepczarek (free agent, from Jagiellonia Białystok)
--	GK	UKR	Serhiy Sitalo (from Stal Alchevsk)

Out: Note: Flags indicate national team as defined under FIFA eligibility rules; some limited exceptions apply. Players may hold more than one non-FIFA nationality.

No.	Pos.	Nation	Player
—	FW	UKR	Oleksandr Kovpak (free agent to Arsenal Kyiv)
--	MF	UKR	Denys Holaido (free agent to Metalurh D.)
--	DF	UKR	Oleksiy Kurylov (loan return to Metalist)
--	DF	BLR	Mikalay Kashewski (free agent)
--	GK	BLR	Vasil Khamutowski (free agent)
--	MF	UKR	Anton Mukhovykov (free agent)

=== FC Volyn Lutsk ===
In: Note: Flags indicate national team as defined under FIFA eligibility rules; some limited exceptions apply. Players may hold more than one non-FIFA nationality.

No.	Pos.	Nation	Player
--	GK	UKR	Vsevolod Romanenko (free agent from Illichivets)
--	MF	UKR	Bohdan Bortnyk (from Dynamo Khmelnytskyi)
--	GK	UKR	Yevhen Soslyuk (free agent)
--	DF	UKR	Yevhen Yevseyev (on loan from Arsenal Kyiv)

Out: Note: Flags indicate national team as defined under FIFA eligibility rules; some limited exceptions apply. Players may hold more than one non-FIFA nationality.

No.	Pos.	Nation	Player
--	FW	BRA	Maicon (to Steaua București)

=== FC Vorskla Poltava ===
In: Note: Flags indicate national team as defined under FIFA eligibility rules; some limited exceptions apply. Players may hold more than one non-FIFA nationality.

No.	Pos.	Nation	Player
--	DF	UKR	Yevhen Selin (from Metalist Kharkiv)
--	MF	UKR	Andriy Oberemko (from Dynamo Kyiv)
--	FW	BLR	Dzmitry Asipenka (from Minsk)
--	MF	BLR	Maksim Karpovich (from Dnyapro Mohilyow)
--	DF	UKR	Oleksiy Kurylov (on loan from Metalist Kharkiv)
--	GK	UKR	Maksym Lavrenyuk (from Naftovyk Okhtyrka)
--	DF	UKR	Pavlo Leshko (from Stal Dniprodzerzhynsk)

Out: Note: Flags indicate national team as defined under FIFA eligibility rules; some limited exceptions apply. Players may hold more than one non-FIFA nationality.

No.	Pos.	Nation	Player
--	FW	UKR	Ihor Tymchenko (loan return to Metalurh D.)
--	DF	UKR	Hryhoriy Yarmash (free agent to Zorya Luhansk)
--	MF	UKR	Oleksandr Rykun (retired)
--	DF	UKR	Hennadiy Medvedyev (retired)
--	MD	MDA	Alexandru Onica (to Dacia Chişinău)

=== FC Zorya Luhansk ===
In: Note: Flags indicate national team as defined under FIFA eligibility rules; some limited exceptions apply. Players may hold more than one non-FIFA nationality.

No.	Pos.	Nation	Player
--	DF	UKR	Hryhoriy Yarmash (free agent from Vorskla Poltava)
--	DF	GHA	Daniel Addo (free agent from King Faisal Babes, 5yrs)

Out: Note: Flags indicate national team as defined under FIFA eligibility rules; some limited exceptions apply. Players may hold more than one non-FIFA nationality.

No.	Pos.	Nation	Player
--	GK	UKR	Bohdan Shust (loan return to Shakhtar)
--	DF	UKR	Stanislav Mykytsey (loan return to Shakhtar)
--	MF	UKR	Ihor Chaykovskyi (loan return to Shakhtar)
--	FW	UKR	Yehor Kartushov (loan return to Shakhtar)

== See also ==
- 2010–11 Ukrainian Premier League
