= Neno (footballer, born 1988) =

Brazilian footballer

Personal information
- Full name: Genison Piacentini de Quadra
- Date of birth: 14 October 1988 (age 38)
- Place of birth: Criciúma, Brazil
- Height: 1.80 m (5 ft 11 in)
- Position: Defender

Team information
- Current team: Ipatinga

Youth career
- 2003–2007: Criciúma
- 2008: América Mineiro

Senior career*
| Years | Team | Apps | (Gls) |
| 2010–2011 | Rio Claro | 12 | (2) |
| 2010 | → Karpaty Lviv (loan) | 1 | (0) |
| 2010 | → PFC Sevastopol (loan) | 11 | (0) |
| 2011 | Náutico | 8 | (0) |
| 2012 | Boa | | |
| 2012 | Oeste | | |
| 2012– | Ipatinga | | |
- * Club domestic league appearances and goals as of 25 June 2011

Genison Piacentini de Quadra, nickname Neno (born October 14, 1988 in Criciúma, Santa Catarina) is a professional Brazilian football player, who plays for Ipatinga Futebol Clube.

== Career ==
Genison Nenu began his career in Brazilian clubs. On 10 May 2010 joined Karpaty Lviv in Ukrainian Premier League on loan until December.
