= Ihor Tistyk =

Ukrainian footballer

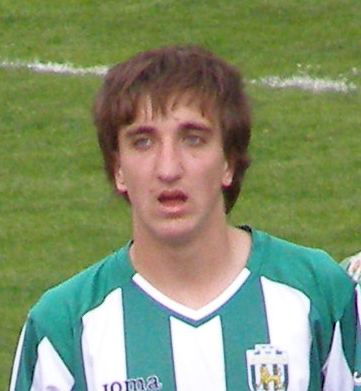

Personal information
- Full name: Ihor Volodymyrovych Tistyk
- Date of birth: 27 May 1989 (age 37)
- Place of birth: Lviv, Ukrainian SSR
- Height: 1.76 m (5 ft 9 in)
- Position: Defender

Youth career
- 2002–2006: Karpaty Lviv

Senior career*
Years	Team	Apps	(Gls)
2006–2012	Karpaty Lviv	1	(0)
2006–2008	Karpaty-2 Lviv	36	(2)
2012	Obolon Kyiv	1	(0)
2012–2013	Helios Kharkiv	15	(0)
2013	Mykolaiv	9	(0)
2013	Sandecja Nowy Sącz	0	(0)
2013–2014	Helios Kharkiv	9	(0)
2015	Dnister Halych	8	(1)
Total		79	(3)
- * Club domestic league appearances and goals

Ihor Tistyk (Ukrainian: Ігор Володимирович Тістик; born 27 May 1989) is a Ukrainian former professional footballer who played as a defender.

He is the product of the Karpaty Lviv Youth School System.
