= Serhiy Ferenchak =

Ukrainian footballer (1984–2021)

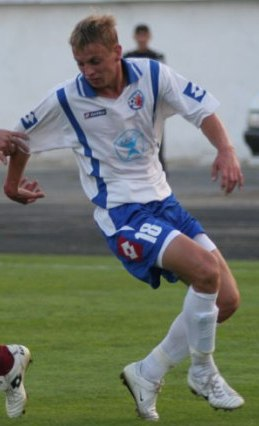
- Ferenchak in 2009

Personal information
- Full name: Serhiy Volodymyrovych Ferenchak
- Date of birth: 27 April 1984
- Place of birth: Krasnoperekopsk, Crimea, Soviet Union
- Date of death: 19 May 2021 (aged 37)
- Height: 1.78 m (5 ft 10 in)
- Position: Midfielder

Youth career
- 1998: Sport School #5 Sevastopol
- 1998–2001: UOR Simferopol

Senior career*
Years	Team	Apps	(Gls)
2004	Tytan Armyansk	4	(0)
2005–2007	Khimik Krasnoperekopsk	38	(10)
2007–2009	Tavriya Simferopol	6	(0)
2007–2008	→ Sevastopol (loan)	31	(4)
2009–2011	Sevastopol	31	(0)
2011–2013	Zorya Luhansk	22	(2)
2014	Belshina Bobruisk	11	(3)
2015–2019	SKChF Sevastopol	79	(12)
2019	Rubin Yalta	1	(0)
Total		223	(31)
- * Club domestic league appearances and goals

Serhiy Ferenchak (Ukrainian: Сергій Володимирович Ференчак); Sergey Ferenchak (Russian: Сергей Владимирович Ференчак; 27 April 1984 – 19 May 2021) was a Ukrainian (until 2014) and Russian football midfielder.
