= Andriy Hurskyi =

Ukrainian footballer (born 1988)

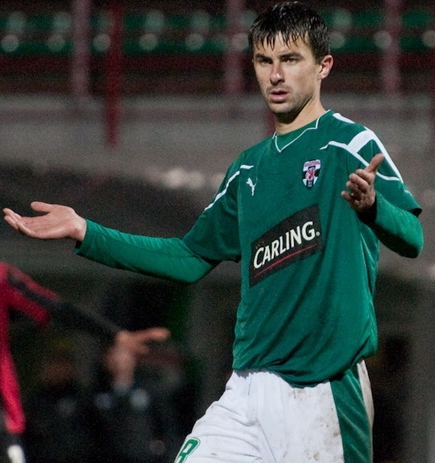

Personal information
- Full name: Andriy Petrovych Hurskyi
- Date of birth: 30 August 1988 (age 38)
- Place of birth: Lviv, Ukrainian SSR
- Height: 1.85 m (6 ft 1 in)
- Position: Defender

Team information
- Current team: FC Mykolaiv

Senior career*
Years	Team	Apps	(Gls)
2005–2011	Karpaty Lviv	2	(0)
2005–2010	→ Karpaty-2 Lviv	29	(1)
2011	Prykarpattya Ivano-Frankivsk	13	(3)
2012	Obolon Kyiv	21	(2)
2013	Sevastopol	1	(0)
2013	Gomel	1	(0)
2014–2017	Rukh Vynnyky	37	(2)
2018	Polissya Zhytomyr	10	(0)
2018	MFC Mykolaiv	10	(0)
2019–	FC Mykolaiv (amateur)		

International career^{‡}
2008	Ukraine-21	2	(0)
- * Club domestic league appearances and goals as of 1 February 2019 ‡ National team caps and goals as of 19 July 2018

Andriy Hurskyi (Ukrainian: Андрій Петрович Гурський; born 30 August 1988) is a Ukrainian professional football defender who plays for FC Mykolaiv. He is the product of the Karpaty Lviv Youth School System.
