= Hryhoriy Baranets =

Ukrainian footballer (born 1986)

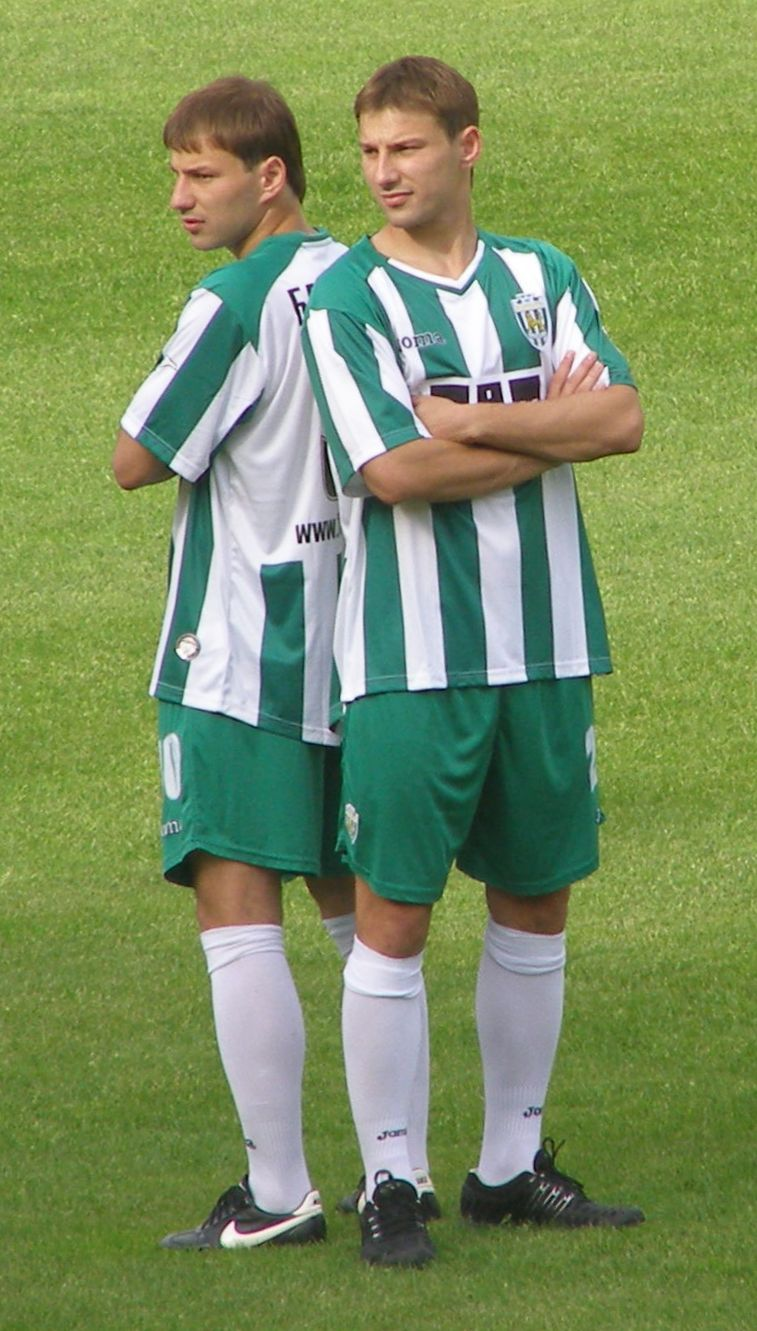
- Hryhoriy (right) standing next to Borys (left)

Personal information
- Full name: Hryhoriy Hrihorovich Baranets
- Date of birth: 22 July 1986 (age 40)
- Place of birth: Lviv, Ukrainian SSR, Soviet Union
- Height: 1.77 m (5 ft 9 1/2 in)
- Position: Midfielder

Youth career
- 2000–2003: Karpaty Lviv

Senior career*
Years	Team	Apps	(Gls)
2003–2004	Halychyna-Karpaty Lviv	26	(2)
2004–2005	Karpaty-2 Lviv	18	(4)
2005	Spartak Ivano-Frankivsk	11	(1)
2006	Hazovyk-Skala Stryi	14	(1)
2006–2010	Lviv	63	(17)
2010	Karpaty Lviv	9	(0)
2011–2013	Obolon Kyiv	41	(2)
2013	Nyva Ternopil	25	(5)
2014–2016	Zirka Kirovohrad	55	(8)
2016–2019	Rukh Vynnyky	69	(8)
Total		331	(48)

International career^{‡}
2004	Ukraine-18	4	(1)
- * Club domestic league appearances and goals as of 28 May 2019 ‡ National team caps and goals as of 11 September 2016

Hryhoriy Baranets (Ukrainian: Григорій Григорович Баранець; born 22 July 1986) is a retired professional Ukrainian football midfielder.

He is the twin brother of Borys Baranets.
