= Samson Godwin =

Nigerian footballer (born 1983)

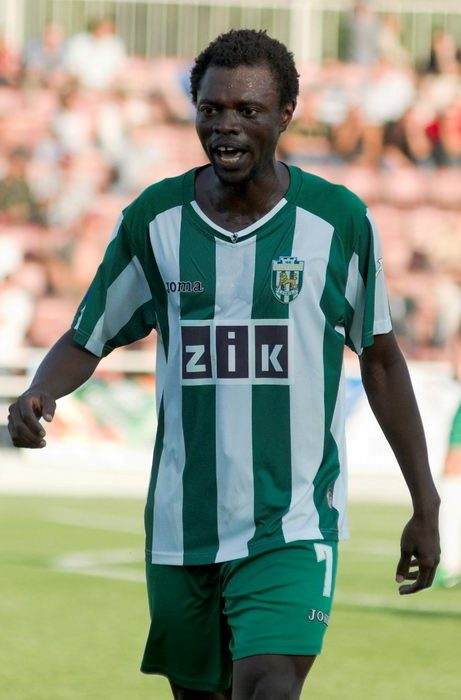

Personal information
- Full name: Samson Godwin
- Date of birth: 11 November 1983 (age 42)
- Place of birth: Warri, Nigeria
- Height: 1.78 m (5 ft 10 in)
- Position: Midfielder

Senior career*
Years	Team	Apps	(Gls)
2000	Gabros F.C.		
2000–2001	Marbet Ceramed Bielsko-Biała		
2001	GKS Katowice	0	(0)
2002–2012	Karpaty Lviv	229	(5)
2002–2003	→ Karpaty-2 Lviv	13	(1)
2003	→ Halychyna-Karpaty Lviv	5	(1)
2009	→ Shakhter Karagandy (loan)	2	(0)
2011	→ Volyn Lutsk (loan)	2	(0)
2012	Minsk	16	(0)
2013	Slavia Mozyr	12	(0)
2013	Karpaty Lviv	4	(0)

International career
2003	Nigeria	1	(0)
- * Club domestic league appearances and goals

Samson Godwin (born 11 November 1983) is a Nigerian former professional footballer who played as a midfielder.

== Career ==
Godwin started his football career in a Nigerian first division club Gabros F.C. at the age of 17. After playing for a season in Nigeria, he was noticed by scouts from Poland, and the following season, in 2000 Godwin moved to Europe, playing for Polish club Marbet Ceramed Bielsko-Biała. After one season at Marbet, Godwin moved to another Polish club GKS Katowice. However, not finding much success there in spring of 2002, Samson Godwin moved to Ukrainian club Karpaty Lviv, where he remained until 2012. A regular for the club, he appeared in over 200 games. He spent the first half of 2009 on loan to Shakhter Karagandy.

In 2006, while playing for Karpaty, Godwin was a candidate for a spot in Nigerian national team. Coach Augustine Eguavoen visited Karpaty's match against Dynamo Kyiv to witness Godwin's game and see the progress of Dynamo's Nigerian midfielder Ayila Yussuf.

== Personal life ==
Godwin claimed that after his football career comes to an end, he would prefer to stay in Ukraine and become a businessman.

His best friend off the pitch is a former Karpaty player William Batista. He is also friends with Nigerian footballer Lucky Idahor, who has formerly performed for Karpaty. Godwin's favourite footballers are Zinedine Zidane and Claude Makélélé.
