= Andriy Sahaydak =

Ukrainian footballer

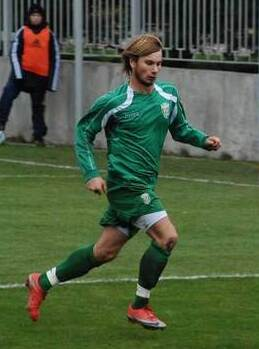
- Sahaydak playing for Karpaty U-21 in 2009

Personal information
- Full name: Andriy Sahaydak
- Date of birth: 2 January 1989 (age 37)
- Place of birth: Ukraine
- Height: 1.70 m (5 ft 7 in)
- Position: Defender

Senior career*
Years	Team	Apps	(Gls)
2006–2010	Karpaty Lviv	2	(0)
2006–2008	→ Karpaty-2 Lviv	20	(2)
2011	→ Chornomorets Odesa (loan)	6	(0)
2011	Prykarpattia Ivano-Frankivsk	15	(4)
2012–2013	Zakarpattia Uzhhorod	7	(0)
2012	→ Poltava (loan)	18	(0)
2013	→ Bukovyna Chernivtsi (loan)	0	(0)
2013	→ Dynamo Khmelnytskyi (loan)	10	(2)
2014	Stal Dniprodzerzhynsk	3	(0)
- * Club domestic league appearances and goals

Andriy Sahaydak (born 2 January 1989) is a professional Ukrainian football defender. He is the product of the Karpaty Lviv Youth School System.

On 24 February 2011, Sahaydak joined Chornomorets on a 6-month loan from Karpaty, with the right of purchase for the Odesa club . At season's end, the right was not exercised, though.
