= Borys Baranets =

Ukrainian footballer (born 1986)

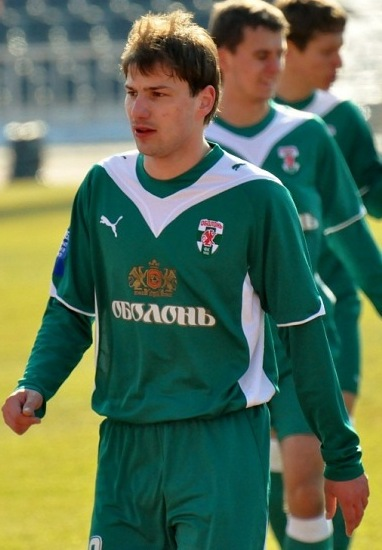

Personal information
- Full name: Borys Hryhorovych Baranets
- Date of birth: 22 July 1986 (age 40)
- Place of birth: Lviv, Ukrainian SSR, Soviet Union
- Height: 1.75 m (5 ft 9 in)
- Position: Midfielder

Youth career
- 2000–2003: Karpaty Lviv

Senior career*
Years	Team	Apps	(Gls)
2003–2004	Halychyna-Karpaty Lviv	19	(2)
2004–2005	Karpaty-2 Lviv	24	(5)
2005	Spartak Ivano-Frankivsk	15	(0)
2006	Hazovyk-Skala Stryi	13	(0)
2006–2010	Lviv	68	(13)
2010–2011	Karpaty Lviv	5	(0)
2011–2013	Obolon Kyiv	48	(6)
2013	Nyva Ternopil	27	(3)
2014–2016	Zirka Kirovohrad	60	(11)
2016–2019	Rukh Vynnyky	68	(10)
Total		347	(50)

International career^{‡}
2004	Ukraine U18	4	(0)
- * Club domestic league appearances and goals as of 28 May 2019 ‡ National team caps and goals as of 11 September 2016

Borys Baranets (Ukrainian: Борис Григорович Баранець; born 22 July 1986) is a retired professional Ukrainian football midfielder.

He is the twin brother of Hryhoriy Baranets.
