= Denys Kozhanov =

Ukrainian footballer

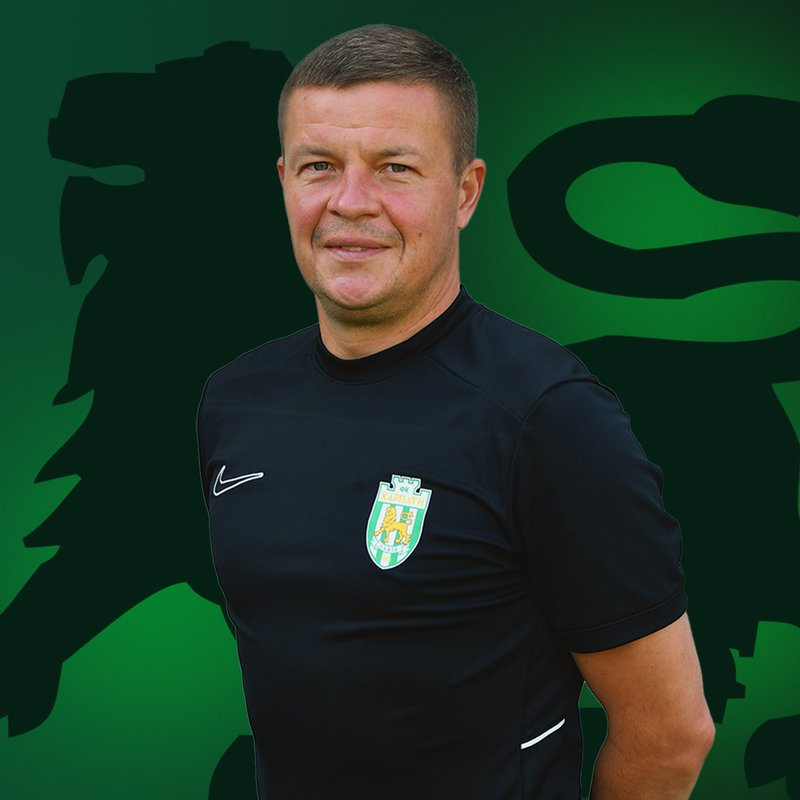

Personal information
- Full name: Denys Stanislavovych Kozhanov
- Date of birth: 13 June 1987 (age 39)
- Place of birth: Hirnyk, Soviet Union (now Ukraine)
- Height: 1.69 m (5 ft 7 in)
- Positions: Attacking midfielder; second striker

Team information
- Current team: Karpaty Lviv (U19 coach)

Youth career
- 2000–2001: Youth Sportive School #3 Mariupol
- 2001–2002: Illichivets Mariupol

Senior career*
Years	Team	Apps	(Gls)
2005–2016	Shakhtar Donetsk	1	(0)
2005–2007	→ Shakhtar-3 Donetsk	16	(3)
2006	→ Shakhtar-2 Donetsk	5	(1)
2007–2011	→ Karpaty Lviv (loan)	73	(14)
2011–2012	→ Illichivets Mariupol (loan)	34	(6)
2013–2014	→ Sevastopol (loan)	37	(2)
2014–2016	→ Karpaty Lviv (loan)	41	(4)
2016	Dacia Chișinău	0	(0)
2016–2017	Mariupol	49	(9)
2018	Veres Rivne	10	(1)
2018–2020	Volyn Lutsk	57	(34)
2020–2021	Mynai	20	(0)
2021–2024	Karpaty Lviv	38	(15)
2023–2024	Karpaty-2 Lviv	15	(3)
2025–	Sich Dobriany (amateurs)	1	(1)

International career
2010–2011	Ukraine	4	(0)

Managerial career
- 2024–: Karpaty Lviv (U19)
- * Club domestic league appearances and goals

Denys Stanislavovych Kozhanov (Ukrainian: Денис Станіславович Кожанов; born 13 June 1987) is a Ukrainian professional football coach and a former midfielder who coaches the Under-19 squad of Karpaty Lviv. From August 2025 he plays for the amateur football club Sich Dobriany.

== Club career ==
Kozhanov started out his football career at the sports schools No.3 of Mariupol and later the FC Illichivets Mariupol academy. Upon graduation he signed with the regional leader FC Shakhtar Donetsk where for the first couple of years played for its second and third teams in lower leagues.

=== Karpaty Lviv ===
In 2007 Kozhanov was lent to Karpaty where he played at first in reserves. On 1 March 2008 he debuted in the Premier League. He became the top assister in the 2009–10 Ukrainian Premier League, giving 13 assists. He played 11 games and scored 2 goals in UEFA Europa League.

=== Volyn Lutsk ===
Kozhanov was recognized as the best player of October 2019 in the Ukrainian First League. He became a second player for Volyn to receive such honors. Same season, 2019–20 Ukrainian First League, Kozhanov also became the season's top scorer with 18 goals.
