= Yevhen Tarasenko =

Ukrainian footballer

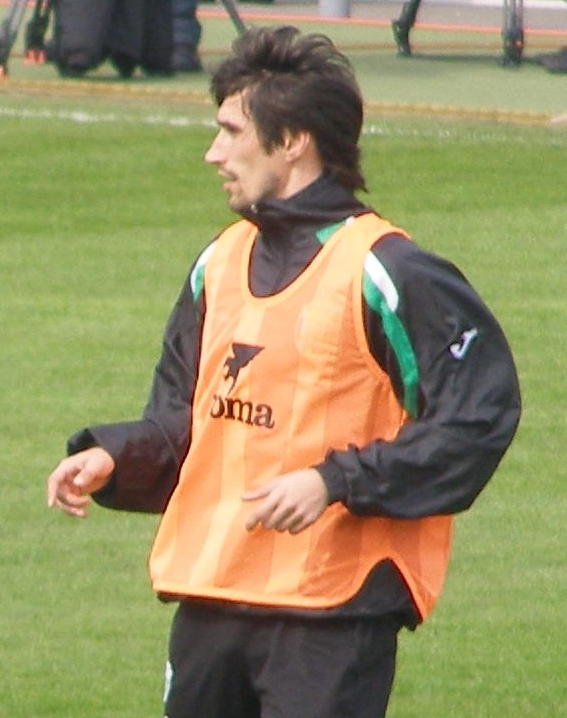

Personal information
- Full name: Yevhen Volodymyrovych Tarasenko
- Date of birth: 3 March 1983 (age 43)
- Place of birth: Cherkasy, Ukrainian SSR
- Height: 1.89 m (6 ft 2 in)
- Position: Defender

Team information
- Current team: FK Grobiņa (sporting director)

Senior career*
Years	Team	Apps	(Gls)
2000–2001	Cherkasy-2	12	(0)
2001–2002	Vorskla-2 Poltava	23	(1)
2003	DPA-TETs Cherkasy	1	(0)
2003–2008	Dnipro Cherkasy	116	(8)
2008–2011	Karpaty Lviv	23	(1)
2011	Chornomorets Odesa	1	(0)
2012–2013	Slavutych Cherkasy	35	(1)
2013–2014	Zoria Biloziria	14	(0)
2015	Nasha Riaba Katerynopil	13	(3)
2016	Zlatokrai-2017 Zolotonosha	7	(3)
2017	Altair Drabiv	3	(0)

Managerial career
- 2018–2020: Dnipro Cherkasy
- 2020: Dnipro Cherkasy (sporting director)
- 2020–2021: LNZ Cherkasy (scout)
- 2021–?: LNZ Cherkasy (sporting director)
- 2025: FK Grobiņa (sporting director)
- * Club domestic league appearances and goals

Yevhen Volodymyrovych Tarasenko (Ukrainian: Євген Володимирович Тарасенко; born 3 March 1983) is a Ukrainian former professional footballer who played as a defender and current sporting director of FK Grobiņa.

== Career ==
He moved from Karpaty Lviv to Chornomorets Odesa on 19 February 2011, having signed a contract for 1.5 years.
