= Mykhaylo Kopolovets =

Ukrainian footballer

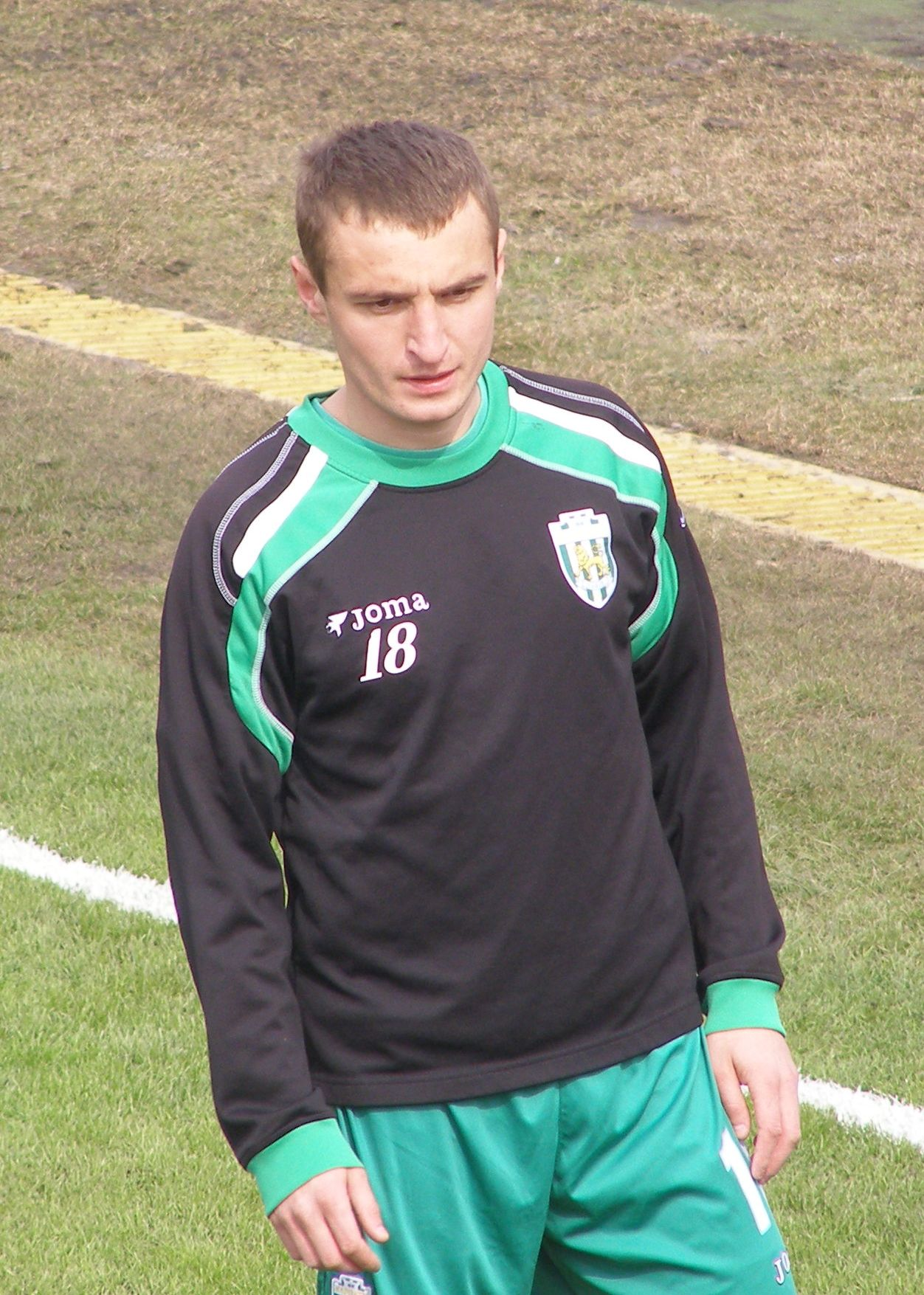

Personal information
- Date of birth: 29 January 1984 (age 42)
- Place of birth: Roztoky, Zakarpattia Oblast, Soviet Union (now Ukraine)
- Height: 1.71 m (5 ft 7 in)
- Position: Midfielder

Youth career
- 1998–2001: SDYuSShOR Uzhhorod

Senior career*
Years	Team	Apps	(Gls)
2002–2007	Zakarpattia Uzhhorod	80	(3)
2001–2002	→ Zakarpattia-2 Uzhhorod	33	(3)
2007–2014	Karpaty Lviv	142	(6)
2013	→ Hoverla Uzhhorod (loan)	8	(0)
2014	→ Belshina Bobruisk (loan)	7	(0)
2015–2016	Einheit Rudolstadt	37	(4)
2017–2020	Mynai	68	(17)
2021	Mynai	1	(0)
- * Club domestic league appearances and goals as of 12 February 2021

Mykhaylo Kopolovets (born 29 January 1984) is a Ukrainian former professional football midfielder who is most known for playing for Zakarpattia Uzhhorod, Karpaty Lviv and Mynai.

== Career statistics ==
Club	Season	League			Cup		Europe		Super Cup		Total	
Club	Season	Division	Apps	Goals	Apps	Goals	Apps	Goals	Apps	Goals	Apps	Goals
Zakarpattia-2 Uzhhorod	2001–02	Ukrainian Second League	33	3	0	0	0	0	0	0	33	3
Zakarpattia-2 Uzhhorod	Total		33	3	0	0	0	0	0	0	33	3
Zakarpattia Uzhhorod	2002–03	Ukrainian First League	15	0	1	0	0	0	0	0	16	0
Zakarpattia Uzhhorod	2003–04	Ukrainian First League	24	1	2	0	0	0	0	0	26	1
Zakarpattia Uzhhorod	2004–05	Vyshcha Liha	12	0	1	0	0	0	0	0	13	0
Zakarpattia Uzhhorod	2005–06	Vyshcha Liha	10	0	2	0	0	0	0	0	12	0
Zakarpattia Uzhhorod	2006–07	Ukrainian First League	19	2	2	1	0	0	0	0	21	3
Zakarpattia Uzhhorod	Total		80	3	8	1	0	0	0	0	88	4
Karpaty Lviv	2007–08	Vyshcha Liha	25	0	1	0	0	0	0	0	26	0
Karpaty Lviv	2008–09	Ukrainian Premier League	22	1	1	0	0	0	0	0	23	1
Karpaty Lviv	2009–10	Ukrainian Premier League	19	0	0	0	0	0	0	0	19	0
Karpaty Lviv	2010–11	Ukrainian Premier League	24	2	1	0	8	1	0	0	33	3
Karpaty Lviv	2011–12	Ukrainian Premier League	20	1	3	0	2	0	0	0	25	1
Karpaty Lviv	2012–13	Ukrainian Premier League	25	2	3	1	0	0	0	0	28	3
Karpaty Lviv	2014–15	Ukrainian Premier League	7	0	0	0	0	0	0	0	7	0
Karpaty Lviv	Total		142	6	9	1	10	1	0	0	161	8
Hoverla Uzhhorod (loan)	2013–14	Ukrainian Premier League	8	0	0	0	0	0	0	0	8	0
Hoverla Uzhhorod (loan)	Total		8	0	0	0	0	0	0	0	8	0
Belshina Bobruisk (loan)	2014	Belarusian Premier League	7	0	1	0	0	0	0	0	8	0
Belshina Bobruisk (loan)	Total		7	0	1	0	0	0	0	0	8	0
Einheit Rudolstadt	2014–15	NOFV-Oberliga	12	0	1	1	0	0	0	0	13	1
Einheit Rudolstadt	2015–16	NOFV-Oberliga	25	4	4	3	0	0	0	0	29	7
Einheit Rudolstadt	Total		37	4	5	4	0	0	0	0	42	8
Career total			292	16	22	6	10	1	0	0	324	23
