= Ihor Khudobyak (footballer, born 1985) =

Ukrainian footballer

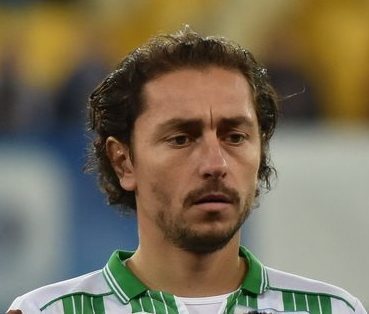
- Khudobyak in 2016

Personal information
- Full name: Ihor Yaroslavovych Khudobyak
- Date of birth: 20 February 1985 (age 41)
- Place of birth: Ivano-Frankivsk, Soviet Union (now Ukraine)
- Height: 1.75 m (5 ft 9 in)
- Position: Midfielder

Team information
- Current team: Ermis Aradippou

Senior career*
| Years | Team | Apps | (Gls) |
| 2002–2004 | Chornohora Ivano-Frankivsk | 60 | (2) |
| 2004–2005 | Spartak Ivano-Frankivsk | 28 | (8) |
| 2005–2017 | Karpaty Lviv | 278 | (33) |
| 2013–2014 | → Rostov (loan) | 13 | (0) |
| 2018 | Akzhayik | 29 | (1) |
| 2019–2023 | Ethnikos Achna | 108 | (8) |
| 2023–2024 | POX | ? | (?) |
| 2024– | Ermis Aradippou | ? | (?) |

International career
| 2006 | Ukraine U21 | 1 | (0) |
| 2010–2011 | Ukraine | 6 | (0) |
- * Club domestic league appearances and goals as of 2 December 2023

Ihor Yaroslavovych Khudobyak (Ukrainian: Ігор Ярославович Худоб’як; born 20 February 1985) is a Ukrainian professional footballer who plays as a midfielder for Ermis Aradippou in Cyprus.

== Club career ==
Khudobyak was born on 20 February 1985 in Ivano-Frankivsk. Before joining Karpaty, Khudobyak played for the club Spartak Ivano-Frankivsk. In Lviv he quickly secured a place in first team and became one of the fan favorites.

In March 2017 Khudobyak was selected as a player of the month in the Ukrainian Premier League, while playing for Karpaty Lviv.

Khudobyak joined Cyprus club Ethnikos Achna on 1 January 2019.

== International career ==
Khudobyak was called up to Ukraine national team for the 2010 FIFA World Cup qualification matches against Greece on 14 and 18 November 2009, but did not take part in either match. He debuted for the national team on 29 May 2010 in a friendly game against Romania.

== Honours ==
Rostov

- Russian Cup: 2013–14

Karpaty Lviv

- Ukrainian First League: 2005–06

Ethnikos Achna

- Cypriot Cup runner-up: 2021–22

Individual

- Ukrainian Premier League player of the Month: 2016–17 (March)
