= Volodymyr Hudyma =

Ukrainian footballer

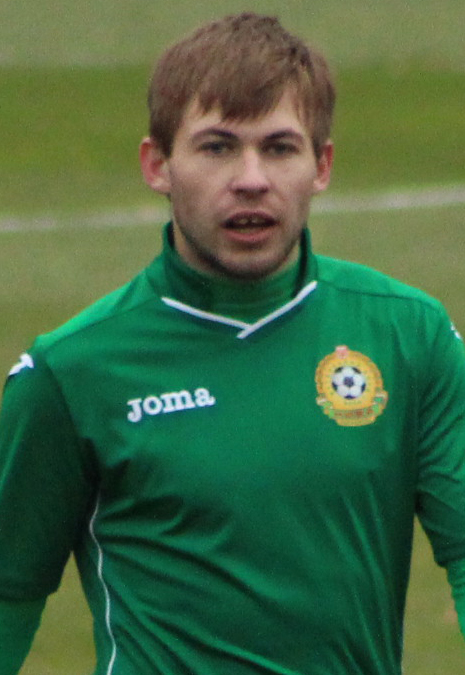

Personal information
- Full name: Volodymyr Yaroslavovych Hudyma
- Date of birth: 20 July 1990 (age 36)
- Place of birth: Ukrainian SSR
- Height: 1.70 m (5 ft 7 in)
- Position: Forward

Youth career
- 2003–2007: FC Karpaty Lviv
- 2007: UFK Lviv

Senior career*
Years	Team	Apps	(Gls)
2007–2014	Karpaty Lviv	14	(1)
2007–2009	Karpaty-2 Lviv	48	(6)
2014	Nyva Ternopil	13	(3)
2015–2016	Chrobry Głogów	31	(5)
2021	Fortuna Głogówek	13	(5)
2023	Markiewicza Krosno	15	(8)
2023–2024	LKS Czeluśnica	25	(13)

International career
2006	Ukraine U16	6	(0)
2006–2007	Ukraine U17	5	(0)
2007–2008	Ukraine U18	7	(0)
2010	Ukraine U20	3	(1)
2010	Ukraine U21	2	(0)
- * Club domestic league appearances and goals as of 15:39, 27 June 2025 (UTC)

Volodymyr Hudyma (Ukrainian: Володимир Ярославович Гудима; born 20 July 1990) is a Ukrainian footballer who plays as a striker.

== Career ==
Hudyma is the product of the Karpaty Lviv Youth School System. He made his debut for FC Karpaty entering as a second-half substitute against FC Kryvbas Kryvyi Rih on 5 May 2010 in Ukrainian Premier League.
