= Taras Petrivskyi =

Ukrainian footballer

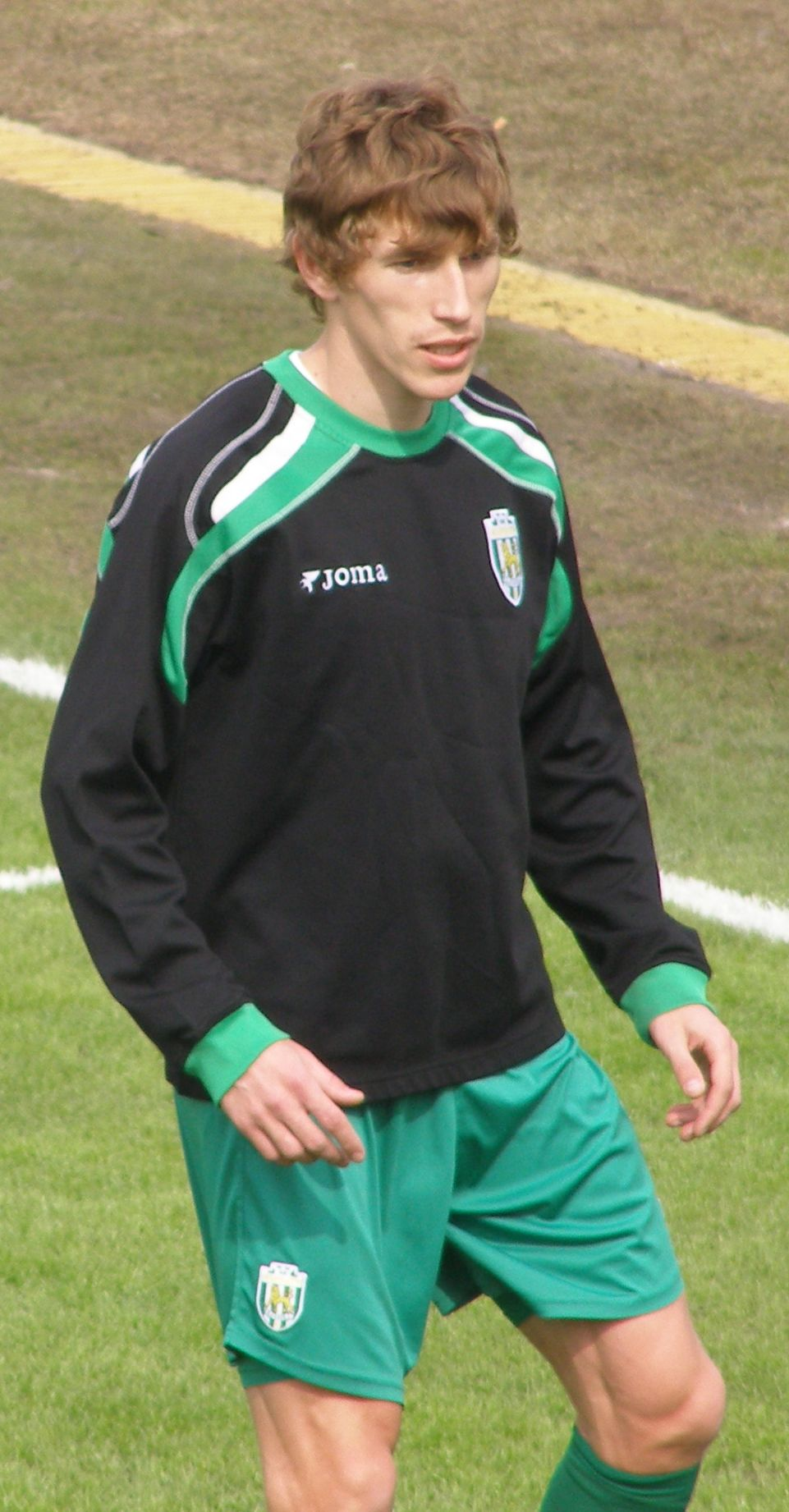

Personal information
- Full name: Taras Petrivskyi
- Date of birth: 3 February 1984 (age 42)
- Place of birth: Stryi, Ukrainian SSR, Soviet Union
- Height: 1.84 m (6 ft 1/2 in)
- Position: Defender

Team information
- Current team: FC Nyva Ternopil
- Number: 2

Youth career
- 1998–2001: UFK Lviv

Senior career*
Years	Team	Apps	(Gls)
2001–2012	FC Karpaty Lviv	118	(2)
2001–2004	→FC Karpaty-3 Lviv	42	(0)
2004–2005	→FC Karpaty 2 Lviv	42	(0)
2012–2013	FC Volgar Astrakhan	13	(0)
2014–	FC Nyva Ternopil	0	(0)
- * Club domestic league appearances and goals as of 25 March 2014

Taras Petrivskyi (Ukrainian: Тарас Степанович Петрівський; born 3 February 1984) is a professional Ukrainian football defender who plays for FC Nyva Ternopil in the Ukrainian First League.
