= Martin Bogatinov =

Macedonian footballer

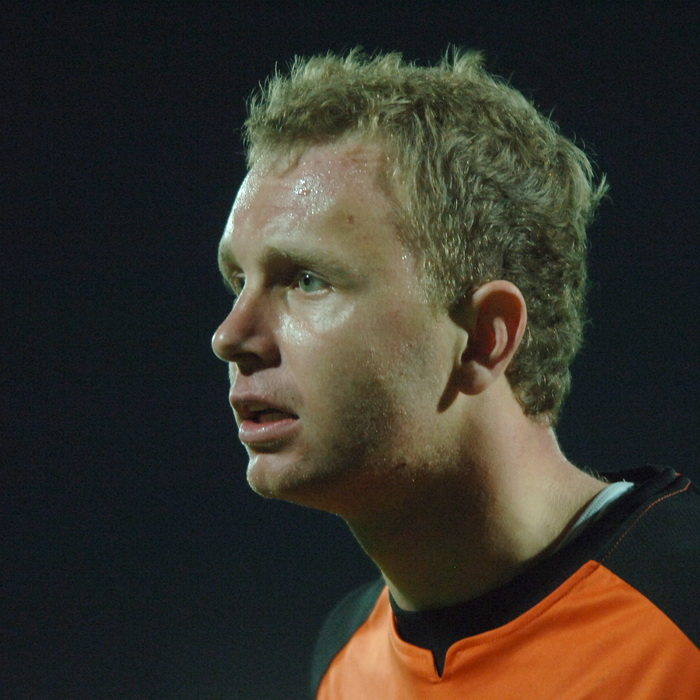

Personal information
- Full name: Martin Bogatinov; Мартин Богатинов
- Date of birth: 26 April 1986 (age 40)
- Place of birth: Kratovo, SR Macedonia, Yugoslavia (now North Macedonia)
- Height: 1.89 m (6 ft 2 1/2 in)
- Position: Goalkeeper

Senior career*
Years	Team	Apps	(Gls)
2005–2007	Sileks	33	(0)
2007	Cementarnica	12	(0)
2007–2008	Vardar	22	(0)
2008–2010	Teteks	24	(0)
2010–2011	Rabotnički	24	(0)
2011–2013	Karpaty Lviv	42	(0)
2014	Steaua București	0	(0)
2014–2015	Ermis Aradippou	23	(0)
2015–2025	Ethnikos Achna	201	(0)

International career^{‡}
2010–2021	North Macedonia	18	(0)
- * Club domestic league appearances and goals as of 3 May 2025 ‡ National team caps and goals as of 9 October 2016

Martin Bogatinov (Macedonian: Мартин Богатинов; born 26 April 1986) is a Macedonian footballer who plays as a goalkeeper.

== Club career ==
In 2010, Bogatinov was named Macedonia's domestic footballer of the year. Between 2014 and 2015, Bogatinov played for Ermis Aradippou FC in the Cypriot First Division.

== International career ==
He made his senior debut for Macedonia in a November 2010 friendly match away against Albania and has earned a total of 18 caps, scoring no goals. His final international was an October 2016 FIFA World Cup qualification match against Italy in Skopje. So after 3 years he was absent from his national team, he had called up again for UEFA Nations League in September 2020 against Armenia national football team and Georgia national football team.

== Honours ==
FK Vardar

- Macedonian Cup: 2006–07

FK Teteks

- Macedonian Vtora Liga: 2008–09
- Macedonian Cup: 2009–10

Steaua București

- Romanian Liga I: 2013–14

Fk Orovnik

- Macedonian Selska Liga I: 2013–14

=== Individual ===
- First Macedonian Football League Player of the Year (1): 2010
