= William Batista (footballer) =

Brazilian footballer

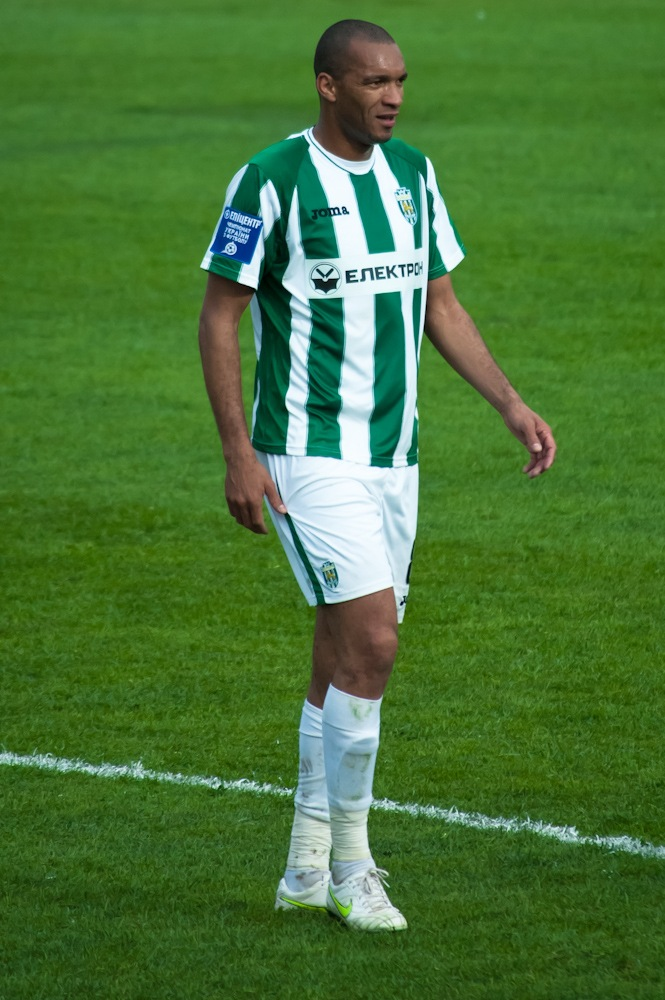

Personal information
- Full name: William Rocha Batista
- Date of birth: July 27, 1980 (age 46)
- Place of birth: São Paulo, Brazil
- Height: 1.86 m (6 ft 1 in)
- Position: Forward

Youth career
- 1996–1998: Portuguesa Santista

Senior career*
Years	Team	Apps	(Gls)
1998–2000	Portuguesa Santista		
2000–2001	União Barbarense		
2001–2002	Levski Sofia	1	(0)
2002	→ Spartak Pleven (loan)	9	(1)
2003–2005	Opava	15	(5)
2005–2008	Karpaty Lviv	68	(22)
2008	FC Kharkiv	9	(2)
2009	→ FK Baku (loan)	8	(5)
2009–2012	Karpaty Lviv	54	(13)
2012	Obolon Kyiv	1	(0)
- * Club domestic league appearances and goals

William Rocha Batista (born 27 July 1980) is a former Brazilian professional footballer who played as an attacking midfielder or forward.

== Career ==
Batista started his career in the small Brazilian club Portuguesa Santista at the age of 16, and after several seasons there he moved to another Brazilian Third Division club, União Barbarense.

Batista then signed for Bulgarian side Levski Sofia, but having failed to secure a regular place in the first team he moved to the Czech club SFC Opava in 2005. That winter, Batista signed a contract with the Ukrainian club Karpaty Lviv. In a successful two-year spell, Batista regularly featured among the league's top scorers, with ten goals from 24 games in the 2006–2007 season.

During the summer of 2007, there was speculation that Dynamo Kyiv was interested in his services, to which Batista responded that he was under contract to Karpaty and had no desire to move. However, in January 2008, Batista signed for FC Kharkiv in a UAH 7.6 million joint deal with Karpaty team-mate Alyaksey Suchkow. For the 2008–09 Season, Batista played 9 games and scored 2 goals.

After the FC Kharkiv's last match of the year against Metalurh, the head coach Mykhailo Stelmakh stated that he would be forming a completely new team for the second part of the 2008–09 season. After going on trial to FK Baku, Baptista impressed the club and the vice-president of Baku Zeynal Mamedov said that "Batista will play on the basis of loan until the end of this season. He set a good impression during the exhibition games to head coach Gjoko Hadžievski, who would like the transfer to be completed."

In August 2009, Batista accepted an offer to return to Karpaty Lviv.
