= 2009–10 FC Zakarpattia Uzhhorod season =

Zakarpattia Uzhhorod
2009–10 season
- Manager: Igor Gamula
- Stadium: Avanhard Stadium
- Ukrainian Premier League: 16th (relegated)
- Ukrainian Cup: Round of 32
- Top goalscorer: League: Vladyslav Mykulyak (3); All: Vladyslav Mykulyak (3)
- Highest home attendance: 9,800 v Dynamo Kyiv (24 March 2010, Ukrainian Premier League)
- Lowest home attendance: 600 v Obolon Kyiv (27 March 2010, Ukrainian Premier League)
- Average home league attendance: 3,267
- Biggest win: 3–0 v Kryvbas Kryvyi Rih (Home, 28 November 2009, Ukrainian Premier League)
- Biggest defeat: 1–4 v Metalurh Donetsk (Away, 2 August 2009, Ukrainian Premier League); 0–3 v Metalurh Zaporizhya (Away, 1 November 2009, Ukrainian Premier League)
Home colours	Away colours	Third colours

The 2009–10 season was Football Club Zakarpattia Uzhhorod's first season back in the Ukrainian Premier League after winning the second division in the previous season. In addition to the domestic league, Zakarpattia Uzhhorod participated in that season's editions of the Ukrainian Cup.

== Squad ==
Squad at end of season

Note: Flags indicate national team as defined under FIFA eligibility rules; some limited exceptions apply. Players may hold more than one non-FIFA nationality.

No.	Pos.	Nation	Player
1	GK	UKR	Oleksandr Nad
2	DF	MDA	Igor Andronic
3	DF	UKR	Oleksandr Chyzhevskyi
4	MF	UKR	Yevhen Lysytsyn
5	MF	RUS	Aleksandr Malygin
6	DF	UKR	Dmytro Semochko
7	MF	MNE	Mirko Raičević
8	DF	UKR	Anton Shendrik
9	FW	UKR	Serhiy Davydov
10	FW	NGA	Charles Newuche
11	FW	MDA	Serghei Alexeev
12	GK	UKR	Yuriy Slavik
13	DF	UKR	Andriy Boyko
14	MF	UKR	Ihor Malysh
15	FW	UKR	Mykhaylo Pop
16	DF	UKR	Andrian Babych
17	DF	UKR	Rostyslav Chyzhevskyy
18	MF	UKR	Volodymyr Braila
19	FW	UKR	Robert Hehedosh
20	DF	ROU	Bogdan Hauși
22	MF	UKR	Oleksiy Ivanov
23	MF	UKR	Vladyslav Mykulyak
24	MF	ARG	Rubén Gómez

No.	Pos.	Nation	Player
26	FW	UKR	Mykhaylo Batryn
27	DF	MDA	Vadim Bolohan
28	MF	UKR	Vasyl Vakh
29	DF	BRA	Leândro
30	MF	SRB	Aleksandar Trišović (on loan from Metalist Kharkiv)
31	MF	UKR	Zoltan Heletey
32	DF	UKR	Yevhen Kelemanyk
33	GK	UKR	Dmytro Babenko
35	FW	UKR	Mykhaylo Trukhan
37	GK	UKR	Myroslav Lyutnyanskyy
38	DF	UKR	Ihor Varha
39	MF	UKR	Vasyl Horskiy
40	DF	UKR	Vitaliy Shevkovtsov
41	DF	UKR	Robert Molnar
42	DF	UKR	Stanislav Kovalenko
43	DF	UKR	Yuriy Shukal
44	FW	UKR	Oleksandr Rusyn
45	MF	UKR	Viktor Ryashko
46	FW	UKR	Bohdan Kuklushyn
52	DF	UKR	Ivan Kuzma
73	GK	UKR	Andriy Mykhaylov
77	DF	UKR	Vitaliy Komarnytskyi
99	MF	UKR	Oleksandr Zotov (on loan from Metalurh Donetsk)

== Transfers ==
=== Summer ===
In: Note: Flags indicate national team as defined under FIFA eligibility rules; some limited exceptions apply. Players may hold more than one non-FIFA nationality.

No.	Pos.	Nation	Player
—	GK	UKR	Andriy Mykhaylov (from CSKA Kyiv)
--	DF	UKR	Ivan Kozoriz (from FC Kharkiv)
4	DF	UKR	Andriy Donets (loan from SC Tavriya Simferopol)
23	MF	UKR	Oleksandr Artemenko (on loan from SC Tavriya Simferopol)
24	MF	GEO	Vladimir Burduli (on loan from SC Tavriya Simferopol)
23	DF	MDA	Vadim Bolohan (from Zorya)
—	MF	LTU	Aurimas Kučys (from FC Naftovyk-Ukrnafta Okhtyrka)
—	FW	UKR	Taras Kabanov (from Metalurh Zaporizhzhia)
—	FW	UKR	Andriy Koval (from Metalist Kharkiv)
—	FW	UKR	Pavlo Ksyonz (on loan from Dynamo Kyiv)
--	FW	RUS	Sergei Ryzhikh (from Metallug Lipetsk)
--	MF	ARG	Ruben Gomez (from Zorya Lunansk)
—	FW	ANT	Sendley Bito (on loan from Arsenal Kyiv)

Out: Note: Flags indicate national team as defined under FIFA eligibility rules; some limited exceptions apply. Players may hold more than one non-FIFA nationality.

No.	Pos.	Nation	Player
20	FW	NGA	Eddy Dombraye (to FC Feniks-Illychovets Kalinine)
13	DF	UKR	Serhiy Siminin (to FC Zorya Luhansk)
--	FW	UKR	Taras Kabanov (to FC Volyn Lutsk)

== Competitions ==
=== Overview ===
Competition	First match	Last match	Starting round	Final position	Record							
Competition	First match	Last match	Starting round	Final position	Pld	W	D	L	GF	GA	GD	Win %
Ukrainian Premier League	17 July 2009	9 May 2010	Matchday 1	16th	30	5	4	21	18	44	−26	16.67
Ukrainian Cup	15 August 2009	15 August 2009	Round of 32	Round of 32	1	0	0	1	2	3	−1	0.00
Total					31	5	4	22	20	47	−27	16.13

Source: Competitions

=== Ukrainian Premier League ===
==== League table ====
Pos	Team	Pld	W	D	L	GF	GA	GD	Pts	Qualification or relegation
12	Illichivets Mariupol	30	7	8	15	31	56	−25	29	
13	Zorya Luhansk	30	7	7	16	23	47	−24	28	
14	Kryvbas Kryvyi Rih	30	7	4	19	31	47	−16	25	
15	Chornomorets Odesa (R)	30	5	9	16	21	44	−23	24	Relegation to Ukrainian First League
16	Zakarpattia Uzhhorod (R)	30	5	4	21	18	44	−26	19	Relegation to Ukrainian First League

Source: uafootball.net.ua
Rules for classification: 1st points; 2nd goal difference; 3rd goals scored; 4th fair play
(R) Relegated

==== Results summary ====
Overall								Home						Away					
Pld	W	D	L	GF	GA	GD	Pts	W	D	L	GF	GA	GD	W	D	L	GF	GA	GD
30	5	4	21	18	44	−26	19	4	3	8	12	17	−5	1	1	13	6	27	−21

Source: Worldfootball

==== Results by round ====
Round	1	2	3	4	5	6	7	8	9	10	11	12	13	14	15	16	17	18	19	20	21	22	23	24	25	26	27	28	29	30
Ground	A	H	A	H	A	H	A	H	A	A	H	A	H	A	H	H	A	H	A	H	A	H	A	H	H	A	H	A	H	A
Result	L	L	L	L	L	W	W	L	L	L	D	L	W	L	W	L	L	L	L	W	D	L	L	D	D	L	L	L	L	L
Position	12	14	15	15	16	15	13	14	14	15	15	16	14	14	13	13	14	15	15	15	14	14	14	15	15	15	15	16	16	16
Points	0	0	0	0	0	3	6	6	6	6	7	7	10	10	13	13	13	13	13	16	17	17	17	18	19	19	19	19	19	19

Source: Worldfootball
A = Away; H = Home; W = Win; D = Draw; L = Loss

==== Matches ====
17 July 2009 1	Illichivets Mariupol	1–0	Zakarpattia Uzhhorod	Mariupol
18:00 EEST (UTC+3)	Savin (yellow card) 69'; Tyshchenko 72'	Report	Kučys (yellow card) 31'; Kozoriz (yellow card) 69'	Stadium: Illichivets Stadium; Attendance: 6,500; Referee: Ihor Pokydko; Assistant referees: Oleksandr Korniyko, Gennadiy Bich

26 July 2009 2	Zakarpattia Uzhhorod	1–3	Vorskla Poltava	Uzhhorod
17:00 EEST (UTC+3)	Kučys (yellow card) 23'; Shendrik 68'; Braila (yellow card) 84'	Report	Yarmash (yellow card) 9'; Markoski 17', 51', (yellow card) 27'; Despotovski 35'; Kulakov (yellow card) 73'; Dolhanskyi (yellow card) 74'	Stadium: Avanhard Stadium; Attendance: 7,300; Referee: Yevgenij Venher; Assistant referees: Mykola Levko, Vasil Olshanetskiy

2 August 2009 3	Metalurh Donetsk	4–1	Zakarpattia Uzhhorod	Donetsk
19:30 EEST (UTC+3)	Mkhitaryan 31'; Tănasă 35'; Hodin 50'; Mguni (yellow card) 76', (goal) 82'	Report	Braila 89'	Stadium: Metalurh Stadium; Attendance: 2,153; Referee: Oleh Derevinskyi; Assistant referees: Stanislav Boklazhko, Sergiy Tsymbal

9 August 2009 4	Zakarpattia Uzhhorod	0–2	Metalist Kharkiv	Uzhhorod
17:00 EEST (UTC+3)	Artemenko (yellow card) 29'; Ryzhikh (yellow card) 30'; Bolohan (yellow card) 56'	Report	Edmar (yellow card) 14'; Lysenko (yellow card) 35', (goal) 58'; Zézé 90'	Stadium: Avanhard Stadium; Attendance: 4,500; Referee: Sergey Dankovskiy; Assistant referees: Oleksandr Shamich, Sergiy Sobotyuk

22 August 2009 5	Zorya Luhansk	2–0	Zakarpattia Uzhhorod	Luhansk
16:00 EEST (UTC+3)	Kurilov 4'; Lazarovych (yellow card) 51'; Shevchuk 73'; Kolesnichenko (yellow card) 81'; Horodov (yellow card) 90'	Report	Platonov (yellow card) 61'; Ryzhikh (yellow card) 71'	Stadium: Avanhard Stadium; Attendance: 4,000; Referee: Oleg Zubarev; Assistant referees: Oleksandr Voytyuk, Vyacheslav Valuev

29 August 2009 6	Zakarpattia Uzhhorod	2–1	Arsenal Kyiv	Uzhhorod
14:30 EEST (UTC+3)	Davydov 36'; Kozoriz (yellow card) 42'; Gómez 83' (pen.); Babenko (yellow card) 89'	Report	Danilaw (yellow card) 32'; Khomyn (yellow card) 32'; Gusev 65'; Reva (red card) 82'; Hrytsay (yellow card) 90'	Stadium: Avanhard Stadium; Attendance: 1,100; Referee: Vladimir Sirenko; Assistant referees: Oleg Muravyov, Oleksandar Mankovskiy

19 September 2009 7	Obolon Kyiv	0–1	Zakarpattia Uzhhorod	Kyiv
14:00 EEST (UTC+3)	Morozyuk (yellow card) 31'; Lozinskyi (yellow card) 69'; Kitsuta (yellow card) 81'; D. Boyko (yellow card) 84'	Report	Davydov 6', (yellow card) 84'; Trišović (yellow card) 14'; Mykulyak (yellow card) 33'; Donets (yellow card) 80'	Stadium: Obolon Stadium; Attendance: 3,500; Referee: Evgen Abrosimov; Assistant referees: Igor Bytskalo, Andrey Motika

26 September 2009 8	Zakarpattia Uzhhorod	0–2	Dnipro Dnipropetrovsk	Uzhhorod
15:00 EEST (UTC+3)	Trišović (yellow card) 38'	Report	Homenyuk 41', 60'; Denisov (yellow card) 70'	Stadium: Avanhard Stadium; Attendance: 2,200; Referee: Evgen Aranovskiy; Assistant referees: Leonid Yarmolynsky, Volodimir Aleksandrenko

4 October 2009 9	Karpaty Lviv	1–0	Zakarpattia Uzhhorod	Lviv
15:00 EEST (UTC+3)	Godwin (red card) 46'; Kuznetsov 90'	Report	Kozoriz (yellow card) 26'; Andronic (yellow card) 46'; Bolohan (yellow card) 64'	Stadium: Ukraina Stadium; Attendance: 11,000; Referee: Yevgenij Venher; Assistant referees: Mykola Levko, Stanislav Boklazhko

17 October 2009 10	Chornomorets Odesa	2–0	Zakarpattia Uzhhorod	Odesa
14:00 EEST (UTC+3)	Rebenok 24'; Melnyk 27'; Shandruk (yellow card) 32'; Vashchuk (yellow card) 69'; Rudenko (yellow card) 78'	Report		Stadium: Spartak Stadium; Attendance: 2,800; Referee: Andriy Shandor; Assistant referees: Andriy Valenko, Vitaliy Ponomaryov

25 October 2009 11	Zakarpattia Uzhhorod	1–1	Shakhtar Donetsk	Uzhhorod
13:00 EET (UTC+2)	Trišović 50'	Report	Ishchenko (yellow card) 34'; Hai 37'; Kobin (yellow card) 45'; Chyzhov (red card) 78'; Jádson (yellow card) 90'	Stadium: Avanhard Stadium; Attendance: 5,500; Referee: Yuri Hrysio; Assistant referees: Sergiy Voznyak, Igor Ponomarenko

1 November 2009 12	Metalurh Zaporizhya	3–0	Zakarpattia Uzhhorod	Zaporizhya
15:00 EET (UTC+2)	Tsiharaw (yellow card) 19'; Vernydub 25', (red card) 44'; Kryvtsov (yellow card) 29'; Miceika (yellow card) 31'; Alozie 34'; Arzhanov 46'; Kaskov (yellow card) 90'	Report	Trišović (yellow card) 28'; Davydov (yellow card) 67'	Stadium: Slavutych-Arena; Attendance: 1,200; Referee: Igor Ishchenko; Assistant referees: Leonid Yarmolynsky, Sergiy Sobotyuk

21 November 2009 14	Tavriya Simferopol	3–2	Zakarpattia Uzhhorod	Simferopol
15:00 EET (UTC+2)	Idahor 8'; Ljubenović 38'; Karamushka (yellow card) (yellow-red card) 50'; Deonas (yellow card) 69'; Kornyev (yellow card) 70'; Kovpak 90'	Report	Braila (yellow card) 31'; Kozoriz (yellow card) 52'; Davydov 68', (yellow card) 68'; Timchenko 89'	Stadium: Lokomotiv Stadium; Attendance: 3,700; Referee: Oleg Zubarev; Assistant referees: Valeriy Davidov, Vitaliy Drozd

28 November 2009 15	Zakarpattia Uzhhorod	3–0	Kryvbas Kryvyi Rih	Uzhhorod
12:00 EET (UTC+2)	Davydov (yellow card) 42'; Timchenko 54'; Platonov 72' (pen.); Zotov (yellow card) 87'; Ksyonz 89'	Report	Maksymov (yellow card) 37'; Zhdanov (yellow card) 70'; Ivaškevičius (yellow card) 90'	Stadium: Avanhard Stadium; Attendance: 2,000; Referee: Oleh Derevinskyi; Assistant referees: Stanislav Boklazhko, Vyacheslav Valuev

6 December 2009 16	Zakarpattia Uzhhorod	0–1	Illichivets Mariupol	Uzhhorod
12:00 EET (UTC+2)	Mykulyak (yellow card) 16'; Trišović (yellow card) 75'; Ksyonz (yellow card) 77'	Report	Shmakov (yellow card) (yellow-red card) 49'; Pukanych 89'	Stadium: Avanhard Stadium; Attendance: 1,000; Referee: Evgen Abrosimov; Assistant referees: Oleksandr Shamich, Igor Bytskalo

12 December 2009 17	Vorskla Poltava	2–0	Zakarpattia Uzhhorod	Poltava
15:00 EET (UTC+2)	Curri 3', (yellow card) 45'; Bezus 30'; Kulakov (yellow card) 63'	Report	Trišović (yellow card) 45'	Stadium: Oleksiy Butovsky Vorskla Stadium; Attendance: 800; Referee: Andriy Shandor; Assistant referees: Oleg Pluzhnik, Sergiy Bukreyev

27 February 2010 18	Zakarpattia Uzhhorod	0–1	Metalurh Donetsk	Uzhhorod
12:00 EET (UTC+2)	Leândro (yellow card) 35'; Raičević (yellow card) 50'	Report	Mguni 42'; Yankov (yellow card) 72'	Stadium: Avanhard Stadium; Attendance: 3,200; Referee: Andriy Shandor; Assistant referees: Vyacheslav Valuev, Oleksandr Voytyuk

6 March 2010 19	Metalist Kharkiv	2–1	Zakarpattia Uzhhorod	Kharkiv
15:00 EET (UTC+2)	Dević 20' (pen.); Jajá Coelho 67'	Report	Alexeev 79'; Bolohan (yellow card) 90'	Stadium: Metalist Stadium; Attendance: 22,000; Referee: Yuriy Mozharovskyi; Assistant referees: Oleksandr Bilorus, Oleksandr Korniyko

14 March 2010 20	Zakarpattia Uzhhorod	2–1	Zorya Luhansk	Uzhhorod
12:00 EET (UTC+2)	Malygin (yellow card) 44'; Mykulyak 80'; Gómez 85' (pen.); Davydov (yellow card) 90'	Report	Semenenko (yellow card) 55'; Kovalyov (yellow card) 69'; Vitsenets (yellow card) 75'; Shevchuk 78' (pen.); Yezerskiy (yellow card) 84'	Stadium: Avanhard Stadium; Attendance: 3,800; Referee: Yevgenij Venher; Assistant referees: Oleksandr Yakimenko, Igor Bytskalo

19 March 2010 21	Arsenal Kyiv	0–0	Zakarpattia Uzhhorod	Kyiv
13:00 EET (UTC+2)	Șoavă (yellow card) 39'	Report	Raičević (yellow card) 16'; Ivanov (yellow card) 72'; Babenko (yellow card) 90'	Stadium: Lobanovsky Dynamo Stadium; Attendance: 1,500; Referee: Vitaliy Hodulian; Assistant referees: Sergiy Bekker, Valery Lysakevych

24 March 2010 13	Zakarpattia Uzhhorod	1–0	Dynamo Kyiv	Uzhhorod
15:00 EET (UTC+2)	Trišović 54', (yellow card) 90'; A. Boyko (yellow card) 83'; Babenko (yellow card) 90'	Report	El Kaddouri (yellow card) 79'; Khacheridi (yellow card) 90'; Shovkovskyi (yellow card) 90'	Stadium: Avanhard Stadium; Attendance: 9,800; Referee: Yuri Hrysio; Assistant referees: Oleksandr Korniyko, Oleksandr Matiash

27 March 2010 22	Zakarpattia Uzhhorod	0–1	Obolon Kyiv	Uzhhorod
13:30 EET (UTC+2)	Mykulyak (yellow card) 37'; Malygin (yellow card) 40'; Bolohan (yellow card) 90'	Report	Rozhok 54'; Karamushka (yellow card) 65'	Stadium: Avanhard Stadium; Attendance: 600; Referee: Orest Shmigelskiy; Assistant referees: Valeriy Davidov, Oleksandr Bilorus

3 April 2010 23	Dnipro Dnipropetrovsk	1–0	Zakarpattia Uzhhorod	Dnipro
17:00 EEST (UTC+3)	Ferreyra (yellow card) 20'; Kalynychenko 49'; Pashayev (yellow card) 89'	Report	Malygin (yellow card) 72'; Newuche (yellow card) 81'	Stadium: Dnipro Stadium; Attendance: 10,931; Referee: Sergey Lysenchuk; Assistant referees: Andrey Beregovoy, Oleg Vorobyev

11 April 2010 24	Zakarpattia Uzhhorod	1–1	Karpaty Lviv	Uzhhorod
15:00 EEST (UTC+3)	Raičević (yellow card) 46'; Mykulyak 90'	Report	Batista 28', (yellow card) 45'; Khudobyak (yellow card) 53'; Oshchypko (yellow card) 63'	Stadium: Avanhard Stadium; Attendance: 2,000; Referee: Mikhailo Rodionenko; Assistant referees: Edward Karapetyan, Andrey Motika

15 April 2010 25	Zakarpattia Uzhhorod	1–1	Chornomorets Odesa	Uzhhorod
15:00 EEST (UTC+3)	Raičević (yellow card) 11'; Malygin (yellow card) 74'; Lysytsyn 83'; Mykulyak (yellow card) 90'	Report	Matos (yellow card) 11'; Vashchuk 71' (pen.)	Stadium: Avanhard Stadium; Attendance: 4,100; Referee: Serhiy Boyko; Assistant referees: Vladislav Tipanov, Yuriy Manilo

18 April 2010 26	Shakhtar Donetsk	1–0	Zakarpattia Uzhhorod	Donetsk
15:00 EEST (UTC+3)	Hladkyi 42', (yellow card) 43'; Willian (yellow card) 82'	Report	A. Boyko (yellow card) 85'	Stadium: Donbas Arena; Attendance: 23,378; Referee: Vitaliy Hodulian; Assistant referees: Sergiy Voznyak, Igor Ponomarenko

25 April 2010 27	Zakarpattia Uzhhorod	0–1	Metalurh Zaporizhya	Uzhhorod
12:00 EEST (UTC+3)	Leândro (yellow card) 47'; Bolohan (yellow card) 74'	Report	Arzhanov (yellow card) 29'; Nevmyvaka (yellow card) 41'; Nesterov 48'	Stadium: Avanhard Stadium; Attendance: 900; Referee: Sergey Dankovskiy; Assistant referees: Andriy Valenko, Vitaliy Ponomaryov

1 May 2010 28	Dynamo Kyiv	2–0	Zakarpattia Uzhhorod	Kyiv
15:00 EEST (UTC+3)	Milevskyi 12' (pen.); Eremenko (yellow card) 25'; Almeida (red card) 38'; Danilo Silva 49'	Report	Trišović (yellow card) 11'; Lysytsyn (yellow card) 41'	Stadium: Valeriy Lobanovskyi Dynamo Stadium; Attendance: 8,200; Referee: Orest Shmigelskiy; Assistant referees: Volodmir Volodin, Gennadiy Litvinov

5 May 2010 29	Zakarpattia Uzhhorod	0–1	Tavriya Simferopol	Uzhhorod
17:30 EEST (UTC+3)	A. Boyko (yellow card) 22'; Mykulyak (yellow card) 53'; Bolohan (yellow card) 70'; Malygin (yellow card) (yellow-red card) 88'	Report	Matyazh 47', (yellow card) 50'; Đuričić (yellow card) 73'	Stadium: Avanhard Stadium; Attendance: 1,000; Referee: Viktor Shvetsov; Assistant referees: Viktor Kravchenko, Anatoliy Filevich

9 May 2010 30	Kryvbas Kryvyi Rih	3–1	Zakarpattia Uzhhorod	Kryvyi Rih
15:00 EEST (UTC+3)	Bogomazov (yellow card) 53'; Lyopa (yellow card) 57', (goal) 83'; Motuz 57'; Morozyuk 67'	Report	Mykulyak 13'	Stadium: Metalurh Stadium; Attendance: 3,500; Referee: Serhiy Boyko; Assistant referees: Sergiy Sobotyuk, Gennadiy Bich

=== Ukrainian Cup ===
15 August 2009 Round of 32	Zakarpattia Uzhhorod	2–3	Dnipro Dnipropetrovsk	Uzhhorod
17:00 EEST (UTC+3)	Newuche 8'; Artemenko 53'; Kučys (yellow card) 63'; Kozoriz (yellow card) 90+2'	Report	Seleznyov 37' (pen.), 45', (yellow card) 89'; Essola (yellow card) 42'; Rusol (yellow card) 55'; Nazarenko (yellow card) 69'; Lysytskyi 73'; Rotan (red card) 90+2'	Stadium: Avanhard Stadium; Attendance: 2,500; Referee: Mykhailo Rodionenko; Assistant referees: Andriy Valenko, Vitaliy Ponomarev; Fourth official: Yuriy Mozharovskyi

== Statistics ==
=== Overall ===
Appearances (Apps) numbers are for appearances in competitive games only, including sub appearances.

No.	Player	Pos.	Ukrainian Premier League				Ukrainian Cup				Total			
No.	Player	Pos.	Apps	Goal	Booked	Sent off (straight red)	Apps	Goal	Booked	Sent off (straight red)	Apps	Goal	Booked	Sent off (straight red)
1	(Ukraine) Oleksandr Nad	GK	7								7			
2	(Moldova) Igor Andronic	DF	5		1						5		1	
2	(Ukraine) Andriy Ilchyshyn	DF	1				1				2			
3	(Ukraine) Oleksandr Chyzhevskyi	DF	12								12			
4	(Ukraine) Andriy Donets	DF	13		1		1				14		1	
4	(Ukraine) Yevhen Lysytsyn	MF	7	1	1						7	1	1	
5	(Russia) Aleksandr Malygin	DF	10		5	1					10		5	1
6	(Ukraine) Valentyn Platonov	MF	11	1	1		1				12	1	1	
6	(Ukraine) Dmytro Semochko	DF	1								1			
7	(Ukraine) Pavlo Ksyonz	FW	7	2	1						7	2	1	
7	(Montenegro) Mirko Raičević	MF	12		4						12		4	
8	(Ukraine) Anton Shendrik	DF	10	1	1						10	1	1	
9	(Ukraine) Serhiy Davydov	FW	25	2	5		1				26	2	5	
10	(Nigeria) Charles Newuche	FW	17		1		1	1			18	1	1	
11	(Moldova) Serghei Alexeev	FW	12	1							12	1		
11	(Ukraine) Ihor Shopin	MF	1								1			
13	(Ukraine) Andriy Boyko	DF	9		3						9		3	
13	(Ukraine) Volodymyr Mazyar	FW	2								2			
14	(Netherlands Antilles) Sendley Bito	FW	5								5			
14	(Ukraine) Ihor Malysh	MF	2		1						2		1	
15	(Lithuania) Aurimas Kučys	DF	5		2		1		1		6		3	
18	(Ukraine) Volodymyr Braila	MF	17	1	2						17	1	2	
19	(Ukraine) Serhiy Yesin	MF	3								3			
20	(Romania) Bogdan Hauși	DF	11								11			
20	(Ukraine) Ihor Tymchenko	FW	5	2							5	2		
21	(Ukraine) Andriy Koval	FW	1								1			
21	(Ukraine) Oleksandr Sytnik	FW	4				1				5			
22	(Ukraine) Oleksiy Ivanov	MF	13		1						13		1	
22	(Ukraine) Ivan Kozoriz	DF	11		3		1		1		12		4	
23	(Ukraine) Vladyslav Mykulyak	MF	26	3	4						26	3	4	
24	(Argentina) Rubén Gómez	MF	21	2		1	1				22	2		1
25	(Ukraine) Anton Postupalenko	MF	1								1			
27	(Moldova) Vadim Bolohan	DF	28		6						28		6	
29	(Ukraine) Vitaliy Kalinichenko	DF	1				1				2			
29	(Brazil) Leândro	DF	22		2						22		2	
30	(Russia) Sergei Ryzhikh		2		2		1				3		2	
30	(Serbia) Aleksandar Trišović	MF	18	2	8						18	2	8	
33	(Ukraine) Dmytro Babenko	GK	23		3		1				24		3	
77	(Russia) Oleksandr Artemenko	MF	10		1		1	1			11	1	1	
77	(Ukraine) Vitaliy Komarnytskyi	DF	13								13			
88	(Georgia (country)) Vladimir Burduli	MF	4				1				5			
99	(Ukraine) Oleksandr Zotov	MF	8		1						8		1	
Own goals														
Totals				18	60	2		2	2			20	62	2

=== Clean sheets ===
			Clean sheets		
No.	Player	Games Played	Ukrainian Premier League	Ukrainian Cup	Total
33	(Ukraine) Dmytro Babenko	24	4		4
1	(Ukraine) Oleksandr Nad	7			
Totals			4		4
