= 2009–10 Ukrainian Cup =

Kubok Ukrainy

Tournament details
- Country: Ukraine
- Dates: 7 July 2009 – 16 May 2010; 7 July – 5 August 2009 (qualification rounds); 15 August 2009 – 16 May 2010 (main event)
- Teams: 52

Final positions
- Champions: Tavriya Simferopol (1st title)
- Runners-up: Metalurh Donetsk
- Semifinalists: Volyn Lutsk; Shakhtar Donetsk

Tournament statistics
- Matches played: 54
- Goals scored: 161 (2.98 per match)
- Top goal scorer: (Ukraine) Oleksandr Kovpak (5)

The 2009–10 Ukrainian Cup was the 19th annual season of Ukraine's football knockout competition, currently known as DATAGROUP – Football Ukraine Cup or Kubok of Ukraine.

The Cup began with the preliminary round where teams from Druha Liha and Amateur Cup champions participate. In the Second Preliminary Round teams from Persha Liha are drawn into the competition and then in the Round of 32 teams from the Premier League enter the competition.

Tavriya Simferopol defeated Metalurh Donetsk 3–2 in the Cup Final and are Ukraine's Cup Winner representative in the play-off round of the UEFA Europa League 2010–11.

== Team allocation ==
Fifty two teams entered the competition

=== Distribution ===
	Teams entering in this round	Teams advancing from previous round
First qualifying round (18 teams)	17 participants of the Second League (lower seeded); 1 participant of the Amateur Cup winner (Irpin Horenychi)	
Second qualifying round (32 teams)	17 participants of the First League; 6 participants of the Second League (higher seeded)	9 winners from the first qualifying round
Tournament proper (32 teams)	16 participants of the Premier League	16 winners from the second qualifying round

=== Round and draw dates ===
All draws held at FFU headquarters (Building of Football) in Kyiv unless stated otherwise.

Phase	Round	Draw date	Game date
Qualifying	First qualifying round	7 July 2009	18 July 2009
Qualifying	Second qualifying round	22 July 2009	4–5 August 2009
Main event	Round of 32	6 August 2009	15 August 2009
Main event	Round of 16	19 August 2009	12 September 2009
Main event	Quarter-finals	23 September 2009	28 October 2009
Main event	Semi-finals	11 November 2009	24 March 2010
Main event	Final	16 May 2010 at Metalist Stadium, Kharkiv	

=== Teams ===
Enter in First Round		Enter in Second Round		Enter in Round of 32
AAFU; 1 team	PFL League 2; 17/28 teams	PFL League 2; 6/28 teams	PFL League 1; 17/18 teams	UPL; 16/16 teams
Irpin Horenychi	Bastion Illichivsk; Bukovyna Chernivtsi; Dnipro-75 Dnipropetrovsk; Dynamo Khmelnytskyi; Hirnyk Kryvyi Rih; Hirnyk-Sport Komsomolsk; Kremin Kremenchuk; FC Morshyn*; MFC Mykolaiv; Olimpik Donetsk; Olkom Melitopol; Ros Bila Tserkva; Shakhtar Sverdlovsk; FC Sumy; Titan Donetsk; Veres Rivne; Yednist Plysky	Arsenal Bila Tserkva; CSKA Kyiv; Nyva Vinnytsia; FC Poltava; Stal Dniprodzerzhynsk; Tytan Armyansk	Desna Chernihiv; Enerhetyk Burshtyn; Feniks-Illichovets Kalinino; Helios Kharkiv; Ihroservice Simferopol (removed); FC Kharkiv; Krymteplytsia Molodizhne; FC Lviv; Naftovyk-Ukrnafta; Nyva Ternopil; Dnister Ovidiopol; FC Oleksandriya; Prykarpattya Ivano-Frankivsk; FC Sevastopol; Stal Alchevsk; Volyn Lutsk; Zirka Kirovohrad	Arsenal Kyiv; Chornomorets Odesa; Dnipro Dnipropetrovsk; Dynamo Kyiv; Illichivets Mariupol; Karpaty Lviv; Kryvbas Kryvyi Rih; Metalist Kharkiv; Metalurh Donetsk; Metalurh Zaporizhia; Obolon Kyiv; Shakhtar Donetsk; Tavriya Simferopol; Vorskla Poltava; Zakarpattia Uzhhorod; Zorya Luhansk

Notes:

- With the asterisk (*) are noted the Second League teams that were recently admitted to the league from amateurs and the AAFU (amateur) team(s) that qualified in place of the Amateur Cup finalist(s).
- Reserve teams from the Second League: Shakhtar-3, Karpaty-2, Lviv-2, Metalurh-2 (Zaporizhia), Illichivets-2; and Dynamo-2 from the First League were not included in the draw.

=== Bye berth ===
The bye berth appeared because of a small technicality in the pre-season berth allocation. Originally FC Ihroservice Simferopol to the last moment was considered as a member of the 2009–10 First League, yet it was given a condition to provide financial guarantees with the suspense time on July 8, 2009 (2pm LST). With the already ongoing Ukrainian Cup competition that was drawn on July 7, 2009 (just a day ahead), the Crimean club failed to satisfy that condition. The Professional Football League of Ukraine withdrew the club from all its competitions and arranged additional play-off between the second placed teams of the 2008-09 Ukrainian Second League (Arsenal – Poltava). After winning the play-off on July 12, 2009, FC Arsenal Bila Tserkva became a member of the 2009-10 Ukrainian First League, yet the berth assigned to Ihroservice was preserved as bye which was given to FC Kharkiv during the draw on July 22, 2009.

== Competition schedule ==
=== First Preliminary Round (1/64) ===
In this round entered 17 teams from Druha Liha and winners of the Ukrainian Amateur Cup. The draw for the First Preliminary Round was held on July 7, 2009. The matches were played July 18, 2009.

MFC Mykolaiv (2L)	3 – 0	(2L) Olkom Melitopol
Veres Rivne (2L)	2 – 0	(2L) Hirnyk-Sport Komsomolsk
Bastion Illichivsk (2L)	2 – 1	(2L) Kremin Kremenchuk
Irpin Horenychi (AM)^{(1)}	w/o^{(2)}	(2L) Dynamo Khmelnytskyi
FC Sumy (2L)	2 – 1	(2L) Bukovyna Chernivtsi
Shakhtar Sverdlovsk (2L)	1 – 0	(2L) Ros Bila Tserkva
Hirnik Kryvyi Rih (2L)	2 – 2 aet, p. 3–1	(2L) Dnipro-75 Dnipropetrovsk
FC Morshyn (2L)	3 – 0^{(4)}	(2L) Olimpik Donetsk

Notes:

^(1) Qualify as Amateur Cup Champions of Ukraine 2008
^(2) Match not played due to bus accident involving Dynamo Khmelnytsky with several key players receiving serious injuries. PFL withdraws Dynamo from the Cup competition.
^(3) Originally drawn in this round, Yednist Plysky advanced into the next round due to FC Titan Donetsk withdrawal from the Professional ranks.
^(4) Technical 3–0 victory awarded to FC Morshyn. Olimpik Donetsk refused to travel, explaining that its staff had to arrange Euro U-19 2009. The PFL fined Olimpik Donetsk 15,000 hryvni for not arriving for the scheduled match.

=== Second Preliminary Round (1/32) ===
In this round entered all 18 teams from Persha Liha. They were drawn against the 9 winners of the First Preliminary Round. The draw for the Second Preliminary Round took place July 22, 2009. The matches were played August 5, 2009, unless otherwise noted.

Enerhetyk Burshtyn (1L)	1 – 1 aet, p. 6–5^{(6)}	(1L) Helios Kharkiv
Bastion Illichivsk (2L)	0 – 3^{(6)}	(1L) Krymteplitsia Molodizhne
Dnister Ovidiopol (1L)	1 – 0	(2L) Arsenal Bila Tserkva
Desna Chernihiv (1L)	1 – 2	(1L) Nyva Ternopil
Nyva Vinnytsia (2L)	0 – 1	(1L) Feniks-Illichovets Kalinine
Stal Alchevsk (1L)	2 – 1	(1L) PFC Sevastopol
Veres Rivne (2L)	0 – 4	(2L) CSCA Kyiv
FC Sumy (2L)	0 – 1	(1L) Naftovyk-Ukrnafta Okhtyrka
Yednist Plysky (2L)	5 – 1 aet	(2L) Hirnik Kryvyi Rih
MFC Mykolaiv (2L)	1 – 0	(1L) Prykarpattya Ivano-Frankivsk
Irpin Horenychi (AM)	1 – 4^{(7)}	(1L) Volyn Lutsk
FC Poltava (2L)	1 – 0	(1L) FC Lviv
Stal Dniprodzerzhynsk (2L)	1 – 0	(1L) Zirka Kirovohrad
Shakhtar Sverdlovsk (2L)	2 – 0	(2L) FC Morshyn
Tytan Armyansk (2L)	0 – 2	(1L) PFC Oleksandriya

Notes:

^(5) FC Kharkiv advances into the next round due to Ihroservice Simferopol withdrawal from the professional ranks.

^(6) The match was played on August 4, 2009

^(7) The match was played in Bucha, Kyiv Oblast

=== Bracket ===
Round 32
1L	PFC Oleksandria	2
1L	Volyn Lutsk	3*
PL	Kryvbas Kryvyi Rih	5
PL	Zoria Luhansk	0
2L	MFK Mykolaiv	0
1L	Krymteplytsia Molod.	1
PL	Vorskla Poltava	2
PL	Metalurh Zaporizhia	3*
2L	Stal Dniprodzerzhynsk	0
PL	Tavriya Simferopol	4
2L	Shakhtar Sverdlovsk	1
PL	Illichivets Mariupol	3
1L	Stal Alchevsk	1
PL	Chornomorets Odesa	0
2L	CSCA Kyiv	1
PL	Obolon Kyiv	1p
2L	FC Poltava	0
1L	Feniks-Illi. Kalinine	2
PL	Zakarpattia Uzhhorod	2
PL	Dnipro Dnipropet.	3
1L	Naftovyk Okhtyrka	1
PL	Metalurh Donetsk	1p
1L	FC Kharkiv	1
PL	Karpaty Lviv	5
2L	Yednist Plysky	2
1L	Nyva Ternopil	1
1L	Dnister Ovidiopol	1
PL	Shakhtar Donetsk	6
1L	Enerhetyk Burshtyn	0
PL	Metalist Kharkiv	1
PL	Arsenal Kyiv	1
PL	Dynamo Kyiv	2

Round 16
1L	Volyn Lutsk	2
PL	Kryvbas Kryvyi Rih	1
1L	Krymteplytsia Molod.	1
PL	Metalurh Zaporizhia	2
PL	Tavriya Simferopol	4
PL	Illichivets Mariupol	2
1L	Stal Alchevsk	0
PL	Obolon Kyiv	3
1L	Feniks-Illi. Kalinine	1
PL	Dnipro Dnipropet.	2
PL	Metalurh Donetsk	2
PL	Karpaty Lviv	1
2L	Yednist Plysky	1
PL	Shakhtar Donetsk	3
PL	Metalist Kharkiv	0
PL	Dynamo Kyiv	1

Quarterfinals
1L	Volyn Lutsk	2*
PL	Metalurh Zaporizhia	1
PL	Tavriya Simferopol	4
PL	Obolon Kyiv	0
PL	Dnipro Dnipropet.	1
PL	Metalurh Donetsk	2*
PL	Shakhtar Donetsk	2
PL	Dynamo Kyiv	0

Semifinals
1L	Volyn Lutsk	1
PL	Tavriya Simferopol	2
PL	Metalurh Donetsk	2
PL	Shakhtar Donetsk	1

Final
PL	Tavriya Simferopol	3
PL	Metalurh Donetsk	2

=== Round of 32 ===
In this round entered all 16 teams from the Premier League. They were drawn against the 16 winners from the previous round. The draw was random and held on August 6, 2009.

15 August 2009
16:00 LST

FC Poltava (2L)	0–2	(1L) Feniks-Illichivets Kalinine
	Report	Lutsenko 83'; Korolkov 87'

Lokomotyv Stadium, Poltava
Attendance: 2,100
Referee: Andriy Hrysio

15 August 2009
17:00 LST

MFK Mykolaiv (2L)	0–1	(1L) Krymteplytsia Molodizhne
	Report	Vizaver 25'

Municipal Central Stadium, Mykolaiv
Attendance: 4,500
Referee: Vitaliy Diadenko

15 August 2009
16:00 LST

Stal Dniprodzerzhynsk (2L)	0–4	(PL) Tavriya Simferopol
	Report	Kovpak 5'; Platon 8'; Feshchuk 82', 90+1'

Metalurh Stadium, Dniprodzerzhynsk
Attendance: 2,200
Referee: Dmytro Zhukov

15 August 2009
17:00 LST

Stal Alchevsk (1L)	1–0	(PL) Chornomorets Odesa
Kazankov 32'	Report

Stal Stadium, Alchevsk
Attendance: 4,000
Referee: Ihor Pokydko

15 August 2009
16:30 LST

Shakhtar Sverdlovsk (2L)	1–3	(PL) Illichivets Mariupol
Kiryanov 3'	Report	Pukanych 23' (pen.), 79' (pen.); Kasyan 64'

Hariushkin Stadium, Sverdlovsk
Attendance: 4,500
Referee: Yevhen Aranovsky

15 August 2009
17:00 LST

Zakarpattia Uzhhorod (PL)	2–3	(PL) Dnipro Dnipropetrovsk
Newuche 8'; Artiomenko 53'	Report	Selezniov 37' (pen.), 45'; Lysytsky 73'

Avanhard Stadium, Uzhhorod
Attendance: 2,500
Referee: Mykhailo Rodionenko

15 August 2009
17:00 LST

Dnister Ovidiopol (1L)	1–6	(PL) Shakhtar Donetsk
Poltavets 76' (pen.)	Report	Kobin 13'; Willian 37'; Fomin 38'; Jádson 52'; Poliansky 74'; Aghahowa 81'

Spartak Stadium, Odesa^{(8)}
Attendance: 4,000
Referee: Volodymyr Sirenko

15 August 2009
17:00 LST

Yednist Plysky (2L)	2–1	(1L) Nyva Ternopil
Bohdanov 20', 45'^{(9)}	Report	Kuyanov 10'

Yednist Stadium, Plysky (Chernihiv Oblast)
Attendance: 1,000
Referee: Yaroslav Kozyk

15 August 2009
17:00 LST

Arsenal Kyiv (PL)	1–2	(PL) Dynamo Kyiv
Mazilu 58'	Report	Khacheridi 23'; Milevskyi 61' (pen.)

Kolos Stadium, Boryspil
Attendance: 4,720
Referee: Oleh Zubariev

15 August 2009
17:00 LST

FC Kharkiv (1L)	1–5	(PL) Karpaty Lviv
Kykot 80'	Report	Khudobyak 31', 34'; Kuznetsov 39' (pen.); Kozhanov 58'; Batista 67'

Dynamo Stadium, Kharkiv
Attendance: 400
Referee: Yevhen Venger

15 August 2009
17:00 LST

Enerhetyk Burshtyn (1L)	0–1	(PL) Metalist Kharkiv
	Report	Haidash 15'

Enerhetyk Stadium, Burshtyn
Attendance: 4,500
Referee: Orest Shmyhelsky

15 August 2009
17:00 LST

Naftovyk Okhtyrka (1L)	1 – 1 aet pen. 2–4 ^{(10)}	(PL) Metalurh Donetsk
Yesyp 40'	Report	Volovyk 66'

Naftovyk Stadium, Okhtyrka
Attendance: 4,000
Referee: Oleh Oriekhov

15 August 2009
17:00 LST

CSCA Kyiv (2L)	3 – 3 aet pen. 2–4 ^{(11)}	(PL) Obolon Kyiv
Polishchuk 49', 54'; Babych 57' (pen.)	Report	Kutsenko 39' (pen.); Sibiriakov 64'; Moroziuk 84' (pen.)

Dynamo Training Center, Chapaivka, (Kyiv Oblast)^{(12)}
Attendance: 650
Referee: Andriy Yablonsky

15 August 2009
18:00 LST

Kryvbas Kryvyi Rih (PL)	5–0	(PL) Zoria Luhansk
Motuz 9', 56'; Bartulović 15'; Vorobey 50'; Kobakhidze 69'	Report

Metalurh Stadium, Kryvyi Rih
Attendance: 1,000
Referee: Oleh Derevinsky

15 August 2009
18:00 LST

PFC Oleksandria (1L)	2 – 3 aet	(1L) Volyn Lutsk
Kazaniuk 56'; Marynchuk 67'	Report	Pischur 2', 59' (pen.); Lopes 105'

Nika Stadium, Oleksandria
Attendance: 3,500
Referee: Yuriy Vaks

15 August 2009
19:00 LST

Vorskla Poltava (PL)	2 – 3 aet	(PL) Metalurh Zaporizhia
Yesin 35'; Curri 64'	Report	Arzhanov 44'; Nevmyvaka 87'; Hwang 116'

Vorskla Stadium, Poltava
Attendance: 8,200
Referee: Ihor Ishchenko

Notes:

^(8) The match played at Spartak Stadium (Odesa), Odesa to accommodate a larger crowd .

^(12) The match played at Dynamo Club Stadium, Chapayevka (Konche-Zaspa), Kyiv after CSCA Kyiv's home ground was found unsafe.

^(10) Goals for Naftovyk not scored – Andriy Kikot and Oleksandr Aharin, for Metalurh (D) – Fabihno.

^(11) Goals for CSCA not scored – Oleksandr Polishchuk and Oleksandr Kurylko, for Obolon – Mykola Moroziuk.

^(9) Volodymyr Bohdanov scored on the second attempt after his penalty shot was saved by Mykola Virkovsky.

=== Round of 16 ===
In this round entered winners from the previous round (11 Premier League, 4 Persha Liha and 1 Druha Liha teams). The draw is random and was held on August 19, 2009.

12 September 2009
15:00 LST

Yednist' Plysky (2L)	1–3	(PL) Shakhtar Donetsk
Nakonechny 55'	Report	Rakytskiy 44'; Kravchenko 50'; Hladky 84'

Yednist Stadium, Plysky, (Chernihiv Oblast)
Attendance: 1,500
Referee: Yevhen Abrosymov

12 September 2009
16:00 LST

Feniks-Illichivets Kalinine (1L)	1–2	(PL) Dnipro Dnipropetrovsk
Bobukh 10'	Report	Homeniuk 28'; Selezniov 86' (pen.)

Yunist Stadium, Kalinine, (Crimea)
Attendance: 1,500
Referee: Andriy Yablonsky

12 September 2009
16:00 LST

Stal Alchevsk (1L)	0–3	(PL) Obolon Kyiv
	Report	Onysko 5'; Kutsenko 27'; Miroshnychenko 90'

Stal Stadium, Alchevsk
Attendance: 4,000
Referee: Dmytro Zhukov

12 September 2009
18:00 LST

Volyn Lutsk (1L)	2–1	(PL) Kryvbas Kryvyi Rih
Maicon 6'; Pischur 83' (pen.)	Report	Bartulović 66' (pen.)

Avanhard Stadium, Lutsk
Attendance: 8,100
Referee: Yevhen Aranovsky

12 September 2009
18:00 LST

Tavriya Simferopol (PL)	4–2	(PL) Illichivets Mariupol
Kovpak 44'; Platon 51', 79'; Gigiadze 58' (pen.)	Report	Kasyan 64'; Lima 84'

Lokomotyv Stadium, Simferopol
Attendance: 5,600
Referee: Serhiy Dankovsky

12 September 2009
18:00 LST

Krymteplytsia Molodizhne (1L)	1–2	(PL) Metalurh Zaporizhia
Kucherenko 90+4'	Report	Alozi 72'; Poliovy 78'

Krymteplytsia Stadium, Molodizhne
Attendance: 2,000
Referee: Serhiy Boyko

12 September 2009
19:00 LST

Metalist Kharkiv (PL)	0–1	(PL) Dynamo Kyiv
	Report	Zozulia 17'

Metalist Stadium, Kharkiv
Attendance: 32,500
Referee: Andriy Shandor

12 September 2009
18:00 LST

Metalurh Donetsk (PL)	2–1	(PL) Karpaty Lviv
Fabihno 18'; Dimitrov 24' (pen.)	Report	Batista 87'

Metalurh Stadium, Donetsk
Attendance: 2,500
Referee: Oleh Derevinsky

=== Quarterfinals ===
In this round entered winners from the previous round (7 Premier League and 1 Persha Liha teams). The draw was random and was held on September 23, 2009.

28 October 2009
18:00 LST

Tavriya Simferopol (PL)	4–0	(PL) Obolon Kyiv
Idahor 13', 43'; Platon 19'; Monakhov 63'	Report

Lokomotyv Stadium, Simferopol
Attendance: 6,700
Referee: Oleksandr Derdo

28 October 2009
18:00 LST

Volyn Lutsk (1L)	2 – 1 aet	(PL) Metalurh Zaporizhia
Kinash 63'; Maicon 99' (pen.)	Report	Alozi 67'

Avanhard Stadium, Lutsk
Attendance: 9,800
Referee: Serhiy Dankovsky

28 October 2009
19:00 LST

Dnipro Dnipropetrovsk (PL)	1 – 2 aet	(PL) Metalurh Donetsk
Selezniov 24'	Report	Lazić 72'; Ivanko 118'

Dnipro Arena, Dnipropetrovsk
Attendance: 15,600
Referee: Serhiy Lisenchuk

28 October 2009
19:30 LST

Shakhtar Donetsk (PL)	2–0	(PL) Dynamo Kyiv
Srna 23'; Fernandinho 90+3'	Report

Donbas Arena, Donetsk
Attendance: 47,452
Referee: Volodymyr Sirenko

=== Semifinals ===
In this round entered winners from the previous round (3 Premier League and 1 Persha Liha teams). The draw is random and was held on November 11, 2009.

24 March 2010
18:00 LST

Volyn Lutsk (1L)	1–2	(PL) Tavriya Simferopol
Kurylov 54'	Report	Kovpak 6', 44'

Avanhard Stadium, Lutsk
Attendance: 12,000
Referee: Andriy Shandor

24 March 2010
18:00 LST

Metalurh Donetsk (PL)	2–1	(PL) Shakhtar Donetsk
Mguni 6'; Dimitrov 9'	Report	Fernandihno 90+2'

Metalurh Stadium, Donetsk
Attendance: 5,100
Referee: Oleh Zubariev

=== Final ===
The Cup final was played on May 16, 2010.

2010-05-16
22:00 LST

Tavriya Simferopol	3 – 2 (a.e.t.)	Metalurh Donetsk
Feschuk 2'; Kovpak 40' (pen.); Đuričić (yellow card) 90+6' (yellow-red card) 94'; Idahor 97'; Marković (yellow card) 60' (yellow-red card) 120+1'	Report	Mkhitaryan 50'; Mário Sérgio 74'

Metalist Stadium, Kharkiv
Attendance: 21,000
Referee: Oleh Derevynsky

== Top goalscorers ==
As of May 16, 2010

Scorer	Goals	Team
(Ukraine) Oleksandr Kovpak	5 (1)	Tavria Simferopol
(Ukraine) Ruslan Platon	4	Tavria Simferopol
(Ukraine) Kostiantyn Babych	4 (1)	CSCA Kyiv
(Ukraine) Yevhen Seleznyov	4 (3)	Dnipro Dnipropetrovsk
(Ukraine) Serhiy Morozov	3	MFC Mykolaiv
(Ukraine) Ihor Rudyuk	3	Yednist Plysky
(Ukraine) Oleksandr Pischur	3 (2)	Volyn Lutsk

== See also ==
- Ukrainian Second League 2009–10
- Ukrainian Premier League Reserves 2009-10
- Ukrainian First League 2009–10
- UEFA Europa League 2009–10
