= 2009–10 FC Dynamo Kyiv season =

Dynamo Kyiv
2009–10 season
- Manager: Valery Gazzaev
- Stadium: Valeriy Lobanovskyi Dynamo Stadium
- Ukrainian Premier League: 2nd
- Ukrainian Cup: Quarter-finals
- Ukrainian Super Cup: Winners
- UEFA Champions League: Group stage
Home colours	Away colours

The 2009–10 season was Football Club Dynamo Kyiv's 83rd season in existence and 12th consecutive season in the Ukrainian Premier League. In addition to the domestic league, Dynamo Kyiv participated in this season's editions of the Ukrainian Cup, Ukrainian Super Cup and UEFA Champions League.

== Squad ==
Note: Flags indicate national team as defined under FIFA eligibility rules; some limited exceptions apply. Players may hold more than one non-FIFA nationality.

No.	Pos.	Nation	Player
1	GK	UKR	Oleksandr Shovkovskyi
3	DF	BRA	Betão
4	MF	ROU	Tiberiu Ghioane
5	MF	CRO	Ognjen Vukojević
6	DF	CRO	Goran Sablić
7	MF	BRA	Corrêa
7	FW	UKR	Andriy Shevchenko
10	FW	UKR	Artem Milevskyi
11	MF	FIN	Roman Eremenko
14	MF	UKR	Serhiy Kravchenko
17	MF	UKR	Taras Mykhalyk
18	MF	NGR	Frank Temile
20	MF	UKR	Oleh Husiev
22	FW	UKR	Artem Kravets

No.	Pos.	Nation	Player
23	DF	UKR	Oleksandr Romanchuk
25	MF	NGR	Ayila Yussuf
26	DF	UKR	Andriy Nesmachnyi
29	DF	UKR	Vitaliy Mandzyuk
30	DF	MAR	Badr El Kaddouri
31	GK	UKR	Stanislav Bohush
33	FW	NGR	Emmanuel Okoduwa
34	DF	UKR	Yevhen Khacheridi
36	MF	SRB	Miloš Ninković
44	DF	BRA	Leandro Almeida
49	FW	UKR	Roman Zozulya
55	GK	UKR	Oleksandr Rybka
70	FW	UKR	Andriy Yarmolenko

== Competitions ==
=== Overview ===
Competition	First match	Last match	Starting round	Final position	Record							
Competition	First match	Last match	Starting round	Final position	Pld	W	D	L	GF	GA	GD	Win %
Ukrainian Premier League	18 July 2009	9 May 2010	Matchday 1	2nd	30	22	5	3	61	16	+45	73.33
Ukrainian Cup	15 August 2009	28 October 2009	Round of 32	Quarter-finals	3	2	0	1	3	3	+0	66.67
Ukrainian Super Cup	11 July 2009		Final	Winners	1	0	1	0	0	0	+0	0.00
UEFA Champions League	16 September 2009	9 December 2009	Group stage	Group stage	6	1	2	3	7	9	−2	16.67
Total					40	25	8	7	71	28	+43	62.50

Source: Competitions

=== Ukrainian Super Cup ===
11 July 2009 Final	Dynamo Kyiv	0–0 (4–2 p)	Vorskla Poltava	Sumy
20:45 EEST (UTC+3)	Ghioane (yellow card) 17'; El Kaddouri (yellow card) 48'	Report	Dallku (yellow card) 86'	Stadium: Yuvileiny Stadium; Attendance: 18,500; Referee: Yevhen Herenda
	Penalties
	Ninković (penalty scored); Kravchenko (penalty scored); Yarmolenko (penalty scored); Eremenko (penalty scored)		(penalty scored) Curri; (penalty scored) Markoski; (penalty missed) Despotovski; (penalty missed) Dallku
Note: Dynamo Kyiv on penalty kicks 4–2.

=== Ukrainian Premier League ===
==== League table ====
Pos	Team	Pld	W	D	L	GF	GA	GD	Pts	Qualification or relegation
1	Shakhtar Donetsk (C)	30	24	5	1	62	18	+44	77	Qualification to Champions League group stage
2	Dynamo Kyiv	30	22	5	3	61	16	+45	71	Qualification to Champions League third qualifying round
3	Metalist Kharkiv	30	19	5	6	49	23	+26	62	Qualification to Europa League play-off round
4	Dnipro Dnipropetrovsk	30	15	9	6	48	25	+23	54	Qualification to Europa League third qualifying round
5	Karpaty Lviv	30	13	11	6	44	35	+9	50	Qualification to Europa League second qualifying round

Source: uafootball.net.ua
Rules for classification: 1st points; 2nd goal difference; 3rd goals scored; 4th fair play
(C) Champions

==== Results summary ====
Overall								Home						Away					
Pld	W	D	L	GF	GA	GD	Pts	W	D	L	GF	GA	GD	W	D	L	GF	GA	GD
30	22	5	3	61	16	+45	71	14	1	0	40	6	+34	8	4	3	21	10	+11

Source: Competitions

==== Matches ====
18 July 2009 1	Dynamo Kyiv	5–0	Chornomorets Odesa	Kyiv
19:00 EEST (UTC+3)	Kravchenko 4'; Milevskyi 16' (pen.); Husiev 41'; Yarmolenko 55'; Corrêa 80'	Report		Stadium: Valeriy Lobanovskyi Dynamo Stadium; Referee: Mykhailo Rodionenko

25 July 2009 2	Dynamo Kyiv	6–0	Tavriya Simferopol	Kyiv
18:30 EEST (UTC+3)	Husiev 10', 34'; Milevskyi 16'; Corrêa 48'; Yarmolenko 64'; Guilherme 90'	Report		Stadium: Valeriy Lobanovskyi Dynamo Stadium; Referee: Yurii Hrysio

1 August 2009 3	Kryvbas Kryvyi Rih	1–3	Dynamo Kyiv	Kryvyi Rih
19:00 EEST (UTC+3)	Bylykbashi 64' (pen.)	Report	Eremenko 18'; Milevskyi 61'; Yarmolenko 90'	Stadium: Metalurh Stadium; Referee: Ihor Pokydko

8 August 2009 4	Dynamo Kyiv	3–1	Illychivets Mariupol	Kyiv
19:00 EEST (UTC+3)	Ninković 54', 86'; Husiev 61'	Report	Kasyan 57'	Stadium: Valeriy Lobanovskyi Dynamo Stadium; Referee: Oleksandr Derdo

23 August 2009 5	Vorskla Poltava	1–1	Dynamo Kyiv	Poltava
19:00 EEST (UTC+3)	Sachko 16'	Report	Milevskyi 6' (pen.)	Stadium: Oleksiy Butovsky Vorskla Stadium; Referee: Yuriy Mozharovskyi

31 August 2009 6	Dynamo Kyiv	3–1	Metalurh Donetsk	Kyiv
19:00 EEST (UTC+3)	Ninković 39'; Yarmolenko 44'; Shevchenko 90' (pen.)	Report	Tănasă 42'	Stadium: Valeriy Lobanovskyi Dynamo Stadium; Referee: Viktor Shvetsov

20 September 2009 7	Metalist Kharkiv	1–2	Dynamo Kyiv	Kharkiv
19:00 EEST (UTC+3)	Dević 88'	Report	Ghioane 15'; Husiev 67'	Stadium: Metalist Stadium; Referee: Yevhen Herenda

25 September 2009 8	Dynamo Kyiv	2–0	Zorya Luhansk	Kyiv
19:00 EEST (UTC+3)	Milevskyi 22' (pen.); Ghioane 71'	Report		Stadium: Valeriy Lobanovskyi Dynamo Stadium; Referee: Ihor Pokydko

4 October 2009 9	Arsenal Kyiv	0–1	Dynamo Kyiv	Boryspil
15:00 EEST (UTC+3)	Symonenko (yellow card) 90'	Report	Shevchenko 38'; Ghioane (yellow card) 72'; Khacheridi (yellow card) 74'	Stadium: Kolos Stadium; Referee: Oleh Derevinskyi

17 October 2009 10	Dynamo Kyiv	2–1	Obolon Kyiv	Kyiv
19:00 EEST (UTC+3)	Milevskyi 74'; Shevchenko 80'	Report	Yavorskyi 72'	Stadium: Valeriy Lobanovskyi Dynamo Stadium; Referee: Orest Shmyhelskyi

24 October 2009 11	Dnipro Dnipropetrovsk	0–2	Dynamo Kyiv	Dnipro
18:00 EEST (UTC+3)		Report	Ghioane 72'; Milevskyi 87' (pen.)	Stadium: Dnipro Stadium; Referee: Vitaliy Hodulian

31 October 2009 12	Dynamo Kyiv	1–1	Karpaty Lviv	Kyiv
19:00 EET (UTC+2)	Ninković 60'	Report	Zenjov 6'	Stadium: Valeriy Lobanovskyi Dynamo Stadium; Referee: Yevhen Herenda

21 November 2009 14	Dynamo Kyiv	3–0	Shakhtar Donetsk	Kyiv
15:00 EET (UTC+2)	Milevskyi 45', 54'; Yarmolenko (yellow card) 49', (goal) 61'; Magrão (yellow card) 63'; Yussuf (yellow card) 84'	Report	Fernandinho (yellow card) 40'; Srna (yellow card) 50'; Rakitskyi (yellow card) 73'; Willian (yellow card) 84'	Stadium: Valeriy Lobanovskyi Dynamo Stadium; Referee: Viktor Shvetsov

29 November 2009 15	Metalurh Zaporizhya	0–0	Dynamo Kyiv	Zaporizhya
16:00 EET (UTC+2)		Report		Stadium: Slavutych-Arena; Referee: Yuriy Mozharovskyi

5 December 2009 16	Chornomorets Odesa	0–1	Dynamo Kyiv	Odesa
13:00 EET (UTC+2)		Report	Yussuf 88'	Stadium: Spartak Stadium; Referee: Ihor Pokydko

13 December 2009 17	Tavriya Simferopol	2–3	Dynamo Kyiv	Simferopol
16:00 EET (UTC+2)	Gigiadze 41'; Idahor 65'	Report	Milevskyi 8'; Shevchenko 29'; Kravets 83'	Stadium: Lokomotiv Stadium; Referee: Orest Shmyhelskyi

27 February 2010 18	Dynamo Kyiv	1–0	Kryvbas Kryvyi Rih	Kyiv
15:00 EET (UTC+2)	Vukojević 70'	Report		Stadium: Valeriy Lobanovskyi Dynamo Stadium; Referee: Mykhailo Rodionenko

6 March 2010 19	Illychivets Mariupol	1–1	Dynamo Kyiv	Mariupol
15:00 EET (UTC+2)	Tyshchenko 78'	Report	Zozulya 81'	Stadium: Volodymyr Boyko Stadium; Referee: Volodymyr Sirenko

13 March 2010 20	Dynamo Kyiv	1–0	Vorskla Poltava	Kyiv
15:00 EET (UTC+2)	Shevchenko 55'	Report		Stadium: Valeriy Lobanovskyi Dynamo Stadium; Referee: Yevhen Herenda

19 March 2010 21	Metalurh Donetsk	1–1	Dynamo Kyiv	Donetsk
19:00 EET (UTC+2)	Mkhitaryan 81'	Report	Milevskyi 12'	Stadium: Metalurh Stadium; Referee: Viktor Shvetsov

24 March 2010 13	Zakarpattia Uzhhorod	1–0	Dynamo Kyiv	Uzhhorod
16:00 EET (UTC+2)	Trišović 54', (yellow card) 90+3'; Boyko (yellow card) 83'; Babenko (yellow card) 90+3'	Report	El Kaddouri (yellow card) 79'; Shovkovskyi (yellow card) 90+2'; Khacheridi (yellow card) 90+3'	Stadium: Avanhard Stadium; Referee: Yurii Hrysio

28 March 2010 22	Dynamo Kyiv	3–0	Metalist Kharkiv	Kyiv
15:00 EEST (UTC+3)	Mykhalyk 17'; Milevskyi 45+4', 61'	Report		Stadium: Valeriy Lobanovskyi Dynamo Stadium; Referee: Yuriy Mozharovskyi

3 April 2010 23	Zorya Luhansk	0–2	Dynamo Kyiv	Luhansk
15:00 EEST (UTC+3)		Report	Yarmolenko 47', 67'	Stadium: Avanhard Stadium; Referee: Oleksandr Derdo

10 April 2010 24	Dynamo Kyiv	3–1	Arsenal Kyiv	Kyiv
15:00 EEST (UTC+3)	Yussuf (yellow card) 25'; Milevskyi (yellow card) 27', (goal) 65'; Vukojević 34'; Ninković (yellow card) 51'; Almeida (yellow card) 56'; Magrão 62'; Mykhalyk (yellow card) 89'	Report	Șoavă (yellow card) 15'; Zakharevych (yellow card) 45'; Bohdanov (yellow card) 51'; Danilov (yellow card) 69'; Symonenko (yellow card) 75' (yellow-red card) 83'; Zakarlyuka 73'; Shershun (red card) 82'; Mikoliūnas (yellow card) 90+1'	Stadium: Valeriy Lobanovskyi Dynamo Stadium; Referee: Ievgenii Aranovskyi

14 April 2010 25	Obolon Kyiv	0–4	Dynamo Kyiv	Kyiv
19:00 EEST (UTC+3)		Report	Shevchenko 8', 40'; Magrão 63'; Zozulya 83'	Stadium: Obolon Stadium; Referee: Yurii Hrysio

18 April 2010 26	Dynamo Kyiv	2–1	Dnipro Dnipropetrovsk	Kyiv
15:00 EEST (UTC+3)	Magrão 50'; Ghioane 70'	Report	Konoplyanka 18'	Stadium: Valeriy Lobanovskyi Dynamo Stadium; Referee: Oleh Zubariev

24 April 2010 27	Karpaty Lviv	1–0	Dynamo Kyiv	Lviv
18:30 EEST (UTC+3)	Batista 63'	Report		Stadium: Ukraina Stadium; Referee: Viktor Shvetsov

1 May 200 28	Dynamo Kyiv	2–0	Zakarpattia Uzhhorod	Kyiv
16:00 EEST (UTC+3)	Milevskyi 12' (pen.); Eremenko (yellow card) 23'; Almeida (red card) 38'; Silva 48'	Report	Trišović (yellow card) 11'; Lysytsyn (yellow card) 41'	Stadium: Valeriy Lobanovskyi Dynamo Stadium; Referee: Orest Shmyhelskyi

5 May 2010 29	Shakhtar Donetsk	1–0	Dynamo Kyiv	Donetsk
19:00 EEST (UTC+3)	Ilsinho 15'; Kucher (yellow card) 21'; Jádson (yellow card) 32'; Pyatov (yellow card) 72'; Douglas Costa (yellow card) 90'	Report	Vukojević (yellow card) 18'; Yussuf (yellow card) 55'; Shevchenko (yellow card) 82'; Ghioane (yellow card) 87'	Stadium: Donbass Arena; Referee: Paolo Tagliavento (Italy)

9 May 2010 30	Dynamo Kyiv	3–0	Metalurh Zaporizhya	Kyiv
16:00 EEST (UTC+3)	Milevskyi 11', 32'; Kryvtsov 61' (o.g.)	Report		Stadium: Valeriy Lobanovskyi Dynamo Stadium; Referee: Andriy Shandor

=== Ukrainian Cup ===
15 August 2009 Round of 32	Arsenal Kyiv	1–2	Dynamo Kyiv	Boryspil
17:00 EEST (UTC+3)	Shershun (yellow card) 10'; Symonenko (yellow card) 27'; Mazilu 58'; Reva (yellow card) 60'	Report	Khacheridi 23', (yellow card) 23'; Diakhaté (yellow card) 26'; Milevskyi 61' (pen.), (yellow card) 77'; Nesmachnyi (yellow card) 79'	Stadium: Kolos Stadium; Referee: Oleh Zubariev

12 September 2009 Round of 16	Metalist Kharkiv	0–1	Dynamo Kyiv	Kharkiv
19:00 EEST (UTC+3)	Zozulya 17'	Report		Stadium: Metalist Stadium; Referee: Andriy Shandor

28 October 2009 Quarter-finals	Shakhtar Donetsk	2–0	Dynamo Kyiv	Donetsk
19:30 EEST (UTC+3)	Kobin (yellow card) 16'; Srna 23', (yellow card) 46'; Fernandinho (yellow card) 38', (goal) 90+3'; Willian (yellow card) 90+4'	Report	Khacheridi (yellow card) 27'; Milevskyi (yellow card) 45'; Betão (yellow card) 54'; Yarmolenko (yellow card) 70'; Vukojević (red card) 85'	Stadium: Donbass Arena; Referee: Volodymyr Sirenko

=== UEFA Champions League ===
==== Group stage ====
Pos	Team	Pld	W	D	L	GF	GA	GD	Pts	Qualification	BAR	INT	RUB	DKV
1	(Spain) Barcelona	6	3	2	1	7	3	+4	11	Advance to knockout phase	—	2–0	1–2	2–0
2	(Italy) Inter Milan	6	2	3	1	7	6	+1	9	Advance to knockout phase	0–0	—	2–0	2–2
3	(Russia) Rubin Kazan	6	1	3	2	4	7	−3	6	Transfer to Europa League	0–0	1–1	—	0–0
4	(Ukraine) Dynamo Kyiv	6	1	2	3	7	9	−2	5		1–2	1–2	3–1	—

Source: RSSSF

16 September 2009 1	Dynamo Kyiv (Ukraine)	3–1	(Russia) Rubin Kazan	Kyiv, Ukraine
21:45 EEST (UTC+3)	Milevskyi (yellow card) 62'; Yussuf 71'; Magrão 79', (yellow card) 80'; Husyev 85'	Report	Domínguez 25'; Sharonov (yellow card) 28'; Ansaldi (yellow card) 68'; Semak (yellow card) 81'	Stadium: Valeriy Lobanovskyi Dynamo Stadium; Attendance: 15,000; Referee: Alain Hamer (Luxembourg)

29 September 2009 2	Barcelona (Spain)	2–0	(Ukraine) Dynamo Kyiv	Barcelona, Spain
20:45 CEST (UTC+2)	Messi 26'; Pedro 76'	Report	Magrão (yellow card) 37'; Almeida (yellow card) 55'	Stadium: Camp Nou; Attendance: 68,221; Referee: Björn Kuipers (Netherlands)

20 October 2009 3	Inter Milan (Italy)	2–2	(Ukraine) Dynamo Kyiv	Milan, Italy
20:45 CEST (UTC+2)	Stanković (yellow card) 23', (goal) 35'; Maicon (yellow card) 29'; Samuel 47'; Chivu (yellow card) 52'; Zanetti (yellow card) 83'	Report	Mykhalyk 5'; Almeida (yellow card) 31'; Lúcio 40' (o.g.); Shevchenko (yellow card) 61'; Milevskyi (yellow card) 68'; Vukojević (yellow card) 82'	Stadium: San Siro; Attendance: 34,721; Referee: Martin Atkinson (England)

4 November 2009 4	Dynamo Kyiv (Ukraine)	1–2	(Italy) Inter Milan	Kyiv, Ukraine
21:45 EET (UTC+2)	Shevchenko 21'; Almeida (yellow card) 28'; Mykhalyk (yellow card) 53'	Report	Samuel (yellow card) 23'; Lúcio (yellow card) 45'; Milito 86'; Sneijder 89'	Stadium: Valeriy Lobanovskyi Dynamo Stadium; Attendance: 15,900; Referee: Bertrand Layec (France)

24 November 2009 5	Rubin Kazan (Russia)	0–0	(Ukraine) Dynamo Kyiv	Kazan, Russia
20:30 MSK (UTC+3)	Domínguez (yellow card) 56'; Noboa (yellow card) 59'	Report	Shevchenko (yellow card) 37'	Stadium: Central Stadium; Attendance: 23,185; Referee: Felix Brych (Germany)

9 December 2009 6	Dynamo Kyiv (Ukraine)	1–2	(Spain) Barcelona	Kyiv, Ukraine
21:45 EET (UTC+2)	Milevskyi 2'; Almeida (yellow card) 52'; Vukojević (yellow card) 55'; Mykhalyk (yellow card) 78'; Shevchenko (yellow card) 88'	Report	Xavi 33', (yellow card) 81'; Piqué (yellow card) 45'; Ibrahimović (yellow card) 77'; Messi 86'	Stadium: Valeriy Lobanovskyi Dynamo Stadium; Attendance: 16,300; Referee: Howard Webb (England)
