= Andronic =

Andronic is a surname, originaned from the given name Andronikos. Notable people with the surname include:

- Oleg Andronic, Moldovan footballer
- Valeriu Andronic, Moldovan footballer
- Gheorghe Andronic, Moldovan footballer
- David Andronic
- Dorian Andronic, Romanian footballer
- Igor Andronic, Moldovan footballer
- Nicolae Andronic
- Octavian Andronic, Romanian journalist and cartoonist
- Răzvan Andronic
