= Semenenko =

Semenenko (Cyrillic: Семененко) is a surname. It may refer to:

- Artem Semenenko (born 1988), Ukrainian footballer
- Evgeni Semenenko (born 2003), Russian figure skater
- Piotr Semenenko (1814–1886), Polish theologian
- Semyon Semenenko (born 1981), Russian footballer
- Serge Semenenko (1903–1980), Ukrainian-American banker
- Yevhen Semenenko (born 1984), Ukrainian triple jumper
