= Ryzhikh =

Ryzhikh (Russian: Рыжих) is a Russian surname.

- Anastasija Reiberger (Nastja Ryjikh; born 1977), Russian-born German pole vaulter
- Sergei Ryzhikh (born 1979), Russian football player
- Lisa Ryzih (born 1988), Russian-born German pole vaulter, sister of Anastasija
