= Kinash =

Kinash is a surname. Notable people with the surname include:

- Kirsten Kinash (born 1998), Australian synchronised swimmer
- Stepan Kinash (born 2002), Ukrainian biathlete
- Yaroslav Kinash (born 1988), Ukrainian footballer
