= Kučys =

Kučys is a surname. Notable people with the surname include:

- Armandas Kučys (born 2003), Lithuanian footballer
- Aurimas Kučys (born 1981), Lithuanian footballer
