= Valeriu Andronic =

Moldovan footballer and manager

Personal information
- Date of birth: 21 December 1982 (age 43)
- Place of birth: Chișinău, Moldavian SSR, USSR
- Height: 1.75 m (5 ft 9 in)
- Position: Midfielder

Senior career*
Years	Team	Apps	(Gls)
1998–2000	Zimbru Chişinău	52	(20)
2000–2001	Dinamo București	4	(0)
2001–2002	MTK Hungária	16	(0)
2002–2004	Câmpina	12	(5)
2003	→ Dynamo Moscow (loan)	0	(0)
2004	Tiligul Tiraspol	6	(2)
2005	Metalist Kharkiv	10	(0)
2005	→ Oryol (loan)	8	(0)
2006–2007	Politehnica Chişinău	5	(0)
2007	Progresul București	9	(1)
2008	Inter Gaz București	10	(0)
2008	Baltika Kaliningrad	7	(0)
2009	Bohemians Prague	18	(1)
2010	Lokomotiv Astana	28	(7)
2011–2012	SKA-Energiya Khabarovsk	22	(0)
2012	Iskra-Stal Rîbniţa	12	(1)
2013	Zimbru Chişinău	5	(0)
2013–2014	Khujand	6	(3)
2014	Veris	3	(0)
2014	Costuleni	2	(0)
2015	Malkiya Club		
2015–2016	Milsami Orhei	3	(0)
2016	Petrocub Hîncești	10	(1)
2016	Academia Chișinău	9	(0)
Total		257	(41)

International career
2001–2011	Moldova	35	(4)

Managerial career
- 2017: Zimbru Chişinău (U-19)
- 2018–2020: Codru Lozova
- * Club domestic league appearances and goals

Valeriu Andronic (born 21 December 1982) is a Moldovan football manager and a former player.

== Club career ==
Andronic started his career at capital club before cross border to join FC Dinamo București. In summer 2002, he joined MTK Hungária FC on a two-year contract. In August 2003, he moved to Dynamo Moscow on loan.

After he was released by MTK Hungária, he played for Tiligul Tiraspol and FC Metalist Kharkiv in 2004–05 season, before moved to Russian First Division side FC Oryol. He played in the Czech First League in the Czech Republic for Bohemians Prague in 2009.

== International career ==
As age of 18, he was the member of 2002 FIFA World Cup qualification (UEFA) and played three times in the campaign. He was recalled in friendly match on 6 February 2008.

=== International goals ===
Scores and results list Moldova's goal tally first.

No	Date	Venue	Opponent	Score	Result	Competition
1.	11 February 2009	Mardan Sports Complex, Aksu, Antalya, Turkey	North Macedonia	1–1	1–1	Friendly match
2.	10 June 2009	Haradski Stadium, Barysaw, Belarus	Belarus	2–2	2–2	Friendly match
3.	12 August 2009	Vazgen Sargsyan Republican Stadium, Yerevan, Armenia	Armenia	3–1	4–1	Friendly match
4.	9 September 2009	Zimbru Stadium, Chișinău, Moldova	Greece	1–1	1–1	2010 World Cup qualifier

== Personal life ==
Valeriu is cousin with Igor Andronic, and also to brothers Oleg and Gheorghe Andronic, all of them being Moldova international footballers.

He is married to Angela, and they have two sons, David and Marc, and a daughter, Sabina.

His son David is a professional footballer, and they have played at a professional level against each other in the match Milsami Orhei 0–1 Speranța Nisporeni, on 1 November 2015. This was also the first match in the Divizia Națională of Moldova when a father and his son have played against each other.

Valeriu Andronic is the son of Eugenia and Mihai Andronic (born 4 January 1959). His father in his youth was a footballer, and currently is a football coach for children, coaching the junior section of CSCT Buiucani. One uncle, the father of Igor, also was a footballer in his youth.
