= Artem Bobukh =

Ukrainian former football defender

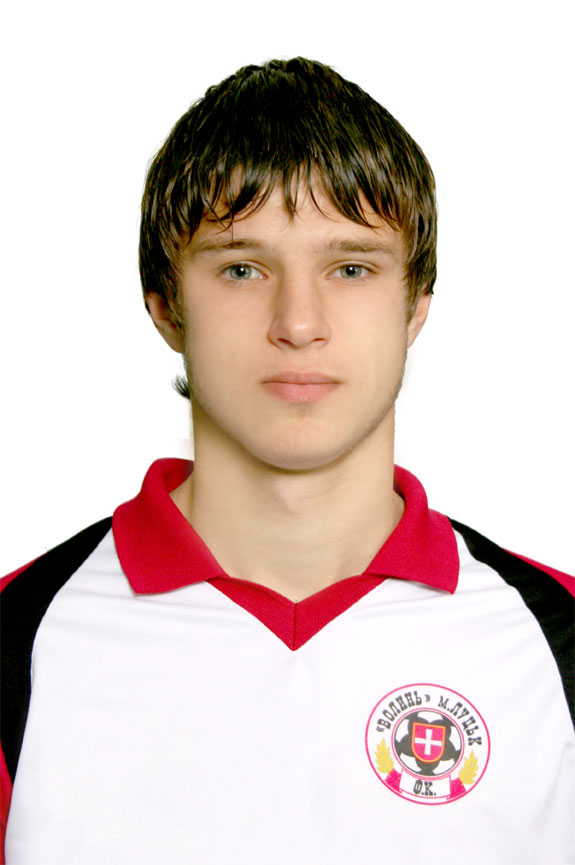

Personal information
- Full name: Artem Oleksandrovych Bobukh
- Date of birth: 4 December 1988 (age 37)
- Place of birth: Sumy, Ukrainian SSR
- Height: 1.94 m (6 ft 4 1/2 in)
- Position: Defender

Youth career
- 2002–2003: Aleks Oleksandrivka

Senior career*
Years	Team	Apps	(Gls)
2007–2008	Volyn Lutsk	22	(0)
2009–2010	Feniks-Illichovets Kalinine	41	(2)
2010–2011	Metalist Kharkiv	0	(0)
2011–2012	Obolon Kyiv	2	(0)
2012–2013	Kryvbas Kryvyi Rih	0	(0)
2013–2014	Volyn Lutsk	0	(0)
2013	→ Belshina Bobruisk (loan)	12	(1)
2014–2016	Belshina Bobruisk	37	(0)
2017	Slutsk	1	(0)
- * Club domestic league appearances and goals as of 3 March 2018

Artem Bobukh (Ukrainian: Артем Олександрович Бобух; born 4 December 1988) is a Ukrainian former football defender.

== Career ==
Bobukh began playing professional football with FC Volyn Lutsk's team. He would next spend 1.5 years with its club. Last time, 19 September 2010, he signed a contract with Metalist Kharkiv in the Ukrainian Premier League.
