= Vadim Bolohan =

Moldovan footballer (born 1986)

Personal information
- Date of birth: 15 August 1986 (age 40)
- Place of birth: Sîngerei, Moldavian SSR, Soviet Union
- Height: 1.86 m (6 ft 1 in)
- Position: Defender

Senior career*
Years	Team	Apps	(Gls)
2002–2003	Agro Chișinău	11	(0)
2004	Baltika Kaliningrad	0	(0)
2005–2006	Nistru Otaci	33	(1)
2007–2008	Dacia Chișinău	34	(2)
2008–2009	Zorya Luhansk	19	(0)
2009–2010	Zakarpattya Uzhhorod	28	(0)
2010–2011	Sevastopol	23	(0)
2011–2012	Milsami Orhei	5	(0)
2012	Karpaty Lviv	5	(0)
2013	Rapid Ghidighici	6	(0)
2013–2014	Milsami Orhei	26	(2)
2015	Tiraspol	11	(1)
2015–2024	Milsami Orhei	171	(6)

International career
	Moldova U17	3	(0)
	Moldova U19	9	(1)
	Moldova U21	25	(0)
2010–2023	Moldova	40	(1)
- * Club domestic league appearances and goals

Vadim Bolohan (born 15 August 1986) is a Moldovan former footballer who played as a defender.

== Career ==
During the 2008–09 summer transfer season, he transferred to Zorya from Dacia Chișinău. While playing for the Moldova national under-21 football team, he played as a central defender and also wore the captain's badge. Bolohan left Zorya in January 2010 and signed for PFK Sevastopol.

== International goals ==
Scores and results list Moldova's goal tally first.

No.	Date	Venue	Opponent	Score	Result	Competition
1.	3 June 2022	Rheinpark Stadion, Vaduz, Liechtenstein	Liechtenstein	2–0	2–0	2022–23 UEFA Nations League
