= Gheorghe Andronic =

Moldovan footballer (born 1991)

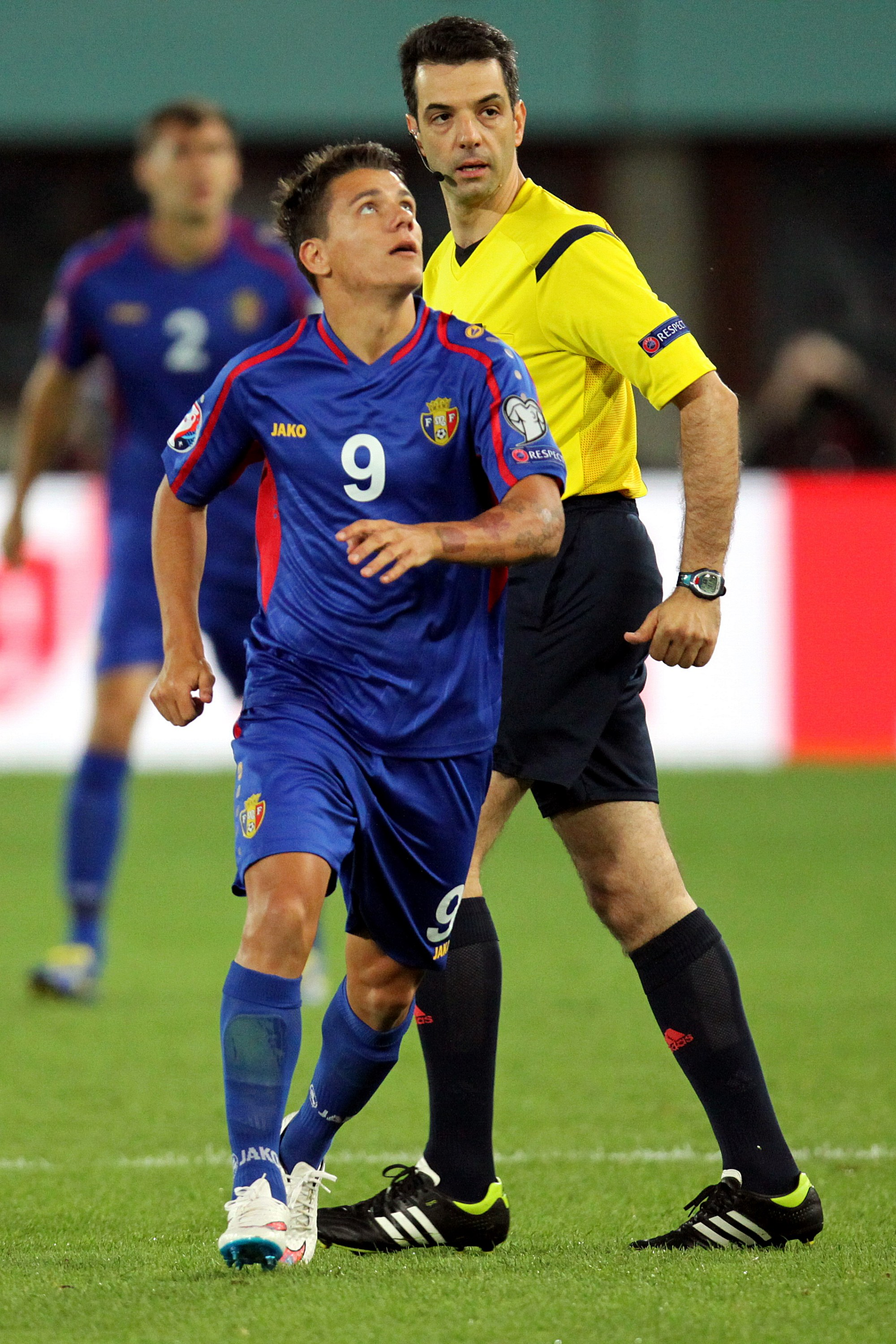
- Andronic with Moldova in 2015

Personal information
- Date of birth: 25 September 1991 (age 35)
- Place of birth: Chișinău, Moldova
- Height: 1.71 m (5 ft 7 in)
- Position: Midfielder

Youth career
- –2008: Zimbru Chișinău

Senior career*
Years	Team	Apps	(Gls)
2008–2009	Zimbru Chișinău	23	(3)
2010–2011	Dinamo Zagreb	0	(0)
2010	→ Lokomotiva Zagreb (loan)	9	(0)
2010	→ Gorica (loan)	2	(0)
2011	Värnamo	26	(1)
2012	Degerfors	7	(0)
2013	Zimbru Chișinău	12	(1)
2013–2019	Milsami Orhei	111	(19)
2019–2020	Astra Giurgiu	0	(0)
2020	Rukh Brest	8	(1)
2020	Speranța Nisporeni	4	(1)
2021	Buzău	10	(2)
2021–2022	Milsami Orhei	26	(1)
2023	Zimbru Chișinău	5	(0)
2023	Spartanii Selemet	9	(0)

International career^{‡}
2008	Moldova U-17	1	(0)
2008	Moldova U-19	3	(0)
2009–2011	Moldova U-21	8	(2)
2011–2017	Moldova	10	(1)
- * Club domestic league appearances and goals as of 26 March 2024 ‡ National team caps and goals as of 19 March 2017

Gheorghe "Gicu" Andronic (born 25 September 1991) is a Moldovan international footballer who plays as a midfielder.

== Career ==
A product of Zimbru Chişinău academy, Andronic had his professional debut for the club in the 2008–09 season. In December 2009 he went on trial at Croatian powerhouse GNK Dinamo Zagreb at the time when manager Krunoslav Jurčić in charge, and went on to sign a five-year contract with Dinamo in the 2010 winter transfer window.

Andronic plays as middle-fielder, and manager Krunoslav Jurčić and director of football Zoran Mamić decided to send him on loan spell at Dinamo Zagreb's satellite club NK Lokomotiva. In the following 2010–11 season it was agreed that Andronic would be sent on loan to HNK Gorica, club that competes in Croatian second division. Andronic debuted for Gorica in the 91st minute of the 12th round in 2010/11 season of 2. HNL with a 93rd-minute assist for a second goal in a 0–2 away win to HNK Suhopolje. On 22 February 2011, resigned his contract with GNK Dinamo Zagreb and joined to Swedish club IFK Värnamo.

== National team ==
After being member of the Moldovan U21 team since 2010, Gheorghe Andronic made his debut for the Moldova national football team on 11 October 2011, in the last group match for the UEFA Euro 2012 qualifying match against San Marino. The match finished with a Moldovan victory of 4–0, which is a record as being the major victory ever of the Moldovan team in official matches, and Andronic contributed by scoring the final goal in the 87th minute of the match.

=== International stats ===
Moldova national team
Year	Apps	Goals
2011	1	1
2012	1	0
2013	1	0
2014	1	0
2015	2	0
2016	3	0
2017	1	0
Total	10	1

=== International goals ===
Scores and results list Moldova's goal tally first.

No	Date	Venue	Opponent	Score	Result	Competition
1.	11 October 2011	Zimbru Stadium, Chișinău, Moldova	San Marino	4–0	4–0	UEFA Euro 2012 qualification

== Personal life ==
Gheorghe is the younger brother of the Moldovan national player Oleg Andronic, and he is cousin with Valeriu Andronic and Igor Andronic who are former members of the national team of Moldova. His uncle Mihai is coach in Moldova.

== Honours ==
Milsami Orhei

- Divizia Națională: 2014–15
- Moldovan Cup: 2017–18
- Moldovan Supercup: 2019

== External sources ==
- Gheorghe Andronic at National-Football-Teams.com
