= Vitaliy Vizaver =

Ukrainian footballer

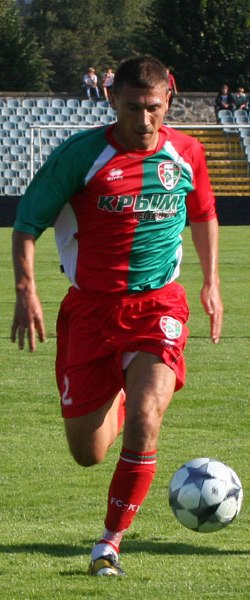

Personal information
- Full name: Vitaliy Yuriyovych Vizaver
- Date of birth: 22 December 1978 (age 47)
- Place of birth: Kherson Oblast, Ukrainian SSR
- Height: 1.80 m (5 ft 11 in)
- Position: Defender

Youth career
- Respublican Sportive School Kyiv

Senior career*
Years	Team	Apps	(Gls)
1996	FC CSKA-2 Kyiv	4	(0)
1996–1997	FC CSKA-2 Kyiv	34	(0)
1998	FC Ryhonda Bila Tserkva	19	(1)
1999–2002	FC Tytan Armyansk	98	(3)
2003	FC Volgar-Gazprom Astrakhan	1	(0)
2003–2005	FC Spartak Ivano-Frankivsk	57	(2)
2003	→ Lukor (loan)	1	(0)
2005–2012	FC Krymteplytsia Molodizhne	181	(6)
2012–2014	FC Avanhard Kramatorsk	53	(2)
2014	FC Myr Hornostayivka	?	(?)
2014	FK Andijan	4	(0)
- * Club domestic league appearances and goals as of 27 August 2014

Vitaliy Vizaver (Ukrainian: Віталій Юрійович Візавер, born 22 December 1978 in the Kherson Oblast in the Ukrainian SSR of the Soviet Union) is a Ukrainian football defender who last played for FK Andijan in the Uzbek League.

== Career ==
Vizaver graduated from Respublikan Sports School in Kyiv and has played for different clubs in the Ukrainian First League. In 2014, he signed a contract with FK Andijan and completed 4 matches for the club.
