= Yuriy Slavik =

Ukrainian footballer

Personal information
- Full name: Yuriy Oleksandrovych Slavik
- Date of birth: 6 May 1989 (age 37)
- Place of birth: Uzhhorod, Soviet Union (now Ukraine)
- Height: 1.93 m (6 ft 4 in)
- Position: Goalkeeper

Team information
- Current team: Uzhhorod
- Number: 12

Youth career
- 2001–2004: SDYuSShOR Uzhhorod
- 2004–2005: DYuSSh-1 Uzhhorod
- 2006: SDYuSShOR Uzhhorod

Senior career*
Years	Team	Apps	(Gls)
2005–2011	Zakarpattia Uzhhorod	2	(0)
2011	Meteor Pistryalovo		
2012	Poliana		
2013–2014	Serednie		
2015	Futura Humenné	5	(0)
2015	Dyida		
2016	Humenné	4	(0)
2016	Dyida	20	(0)
2016–2017	Humenné	11	(0)
2017	Kölcse		
2017	Sevlyush Vynohradiv	3	(0)
2017–2019	Uzhhorod	39	(0)
2019–2020	Tatran Zámutov	12	(0)
2020–2021	Vilkhivtsi	14	(0)
2021–	Uzhhorod	0	(0)
- * Club domestic league appearances and goals as of 14 February 2022

Yuriy Oleksandrovych Slavik (Ukrainian: Юрій Олександрович Славік; born 6 May 1989) is a Ukrainian professional footballer who plays as a goalkeeper for Ukrainian club Uzhhorod.
