= Ivan Kozoriz =

Ukrainian footballer

Personal information
- Full name: Ivan Kozoriz
- Date of birth: 14 September 1979 (age 47)
- Place of birth: Kiev, Ukrainian SSR, Soviet Union
- Height: 1.90 m (6 ft 3 in)
- Position: Defender

Team information
- Current team: FC Poltava
- Number: 30

Senior career*
Years	Team	Apps	(Gls)
2000–2003	FC Systema-Borex Borodianka	62	(7)
2003	FC Borex-Borysfen Borodianka	4	(1)
2004–2005	FC Spartak-Horobyna Sumy	32	(1)
2005–2006	SC Tavriya Simferopol	28	(1)
2006	FC Spartak Sumy	10	(1)
2006–2008	FC Zakarpattia Uzhhorod	54	(5)
2008–2009	FC Kharkiv	23	(1)
2009	FC Zakarpattia Uzhhorod	11	(0)
2010–2011	FC Illichivets Mariupol	23	(1)
2011	FC Prykarpattya Ivano-Frankivsk	7	(0)
2011–2012	FC Naftovyk-Ukrnafta Okhtyrka	29	(3)
2012–2013	FC Poltava	21	(1)

International career
2001	Ukraine (students)		
Medal record
Men's football
Representing Ukraine
Summer Universiade
Silver medal – second place	2001 Beijing	Team competition
- * Club domestic league appearances and goals

Ivan Kozoriz (born 14 September 1979) is a professional Ukrainian football defender. He moved to Kharkiv in the 2008 summer transfer season from FC Zakarpattia Uzhhorod.
