= Artur Kaskov =

Ukrainian footballer

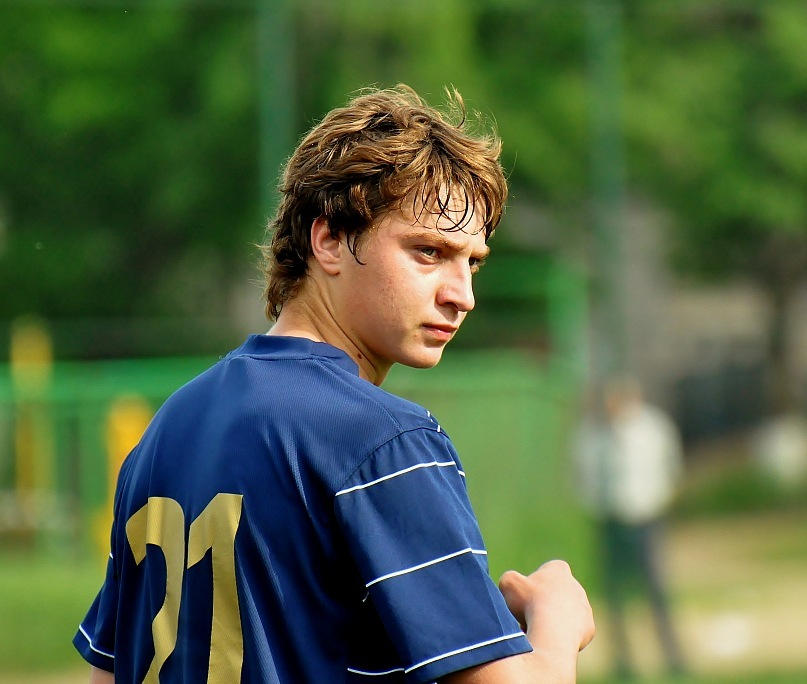

Personal information
- Full name: Artur Henadiyovych Kaskov
- Date of birth: 18 November 1991 (age 34)
- Place of birth: Zaporizhzhia, Ukraine
- Height: 1.81 m (5 ft 11 1/2 in)
- Position: Striker

Team information
- Current team: Tavriya-Skif Rozdol (amateurs)

Youth career
- 2004–2008: Metalurh Zaporizhzhia

Senior career*
Years	Team	Apps	(Gls)
2008–2012	Metalurh-2 Zaporizhzhia	21	(7)
2008–2012	Metalurh Zaporizhzhia	37	(4)
2011	→ Chornomorets Odesa (loan)	15	(0)
2013	Olimpik Donetsk	10	(2)
2013	Bukovyna Chernivtsi	5	(0)
2013	Poltava	7	(0)
2014	Sumy	9	(1)
2015	Veres Rivne	6	(0)
2016	Tavriya-Skif Rozdol (amateurs)	?	(?)
2016–2017	Metalurh Zaporizhzhia	26	(14)
2017	Sumy	14	(1)
2018–	Tavriya-Skif Rozdol (amateurs)	?	(?)

International career^{‡}
2007	Ukraine-17	3	(0)
2009	Ukraine-18	7	(1)
2009–2010	Ukraine-19	8	(1)
2011	Ukraine-21	1	(0)
- * Club domestic league appearances and goals as of 9 February 2018 ‡ National team caps and goals as of 20 January 2014

Artur Kaskov (Ukrainian: Артур Генадійович Каськов; born 18 November 1991) is a professional Ukrainian football striker.
