= Volodymyr Braila =

Ukrainian footballer

Personal information
- Full name: Volodymyr Braila
- Date of birth: 21 August 1978 (age 48)
- Place of birth: Kryvyi Rih, Soviet Union
- Height: 1.84 m (6 ft 0 in)
- Position: Midfielder

Senior career*
Years	Team	Apps	(Gls)
1993–1994	INKO Kryvyi Rih	13	(0)
1994–1997	Nyva Bershad/Sportinvest	14	(0)
1994	→ Budivelnyk Kryvyi Rih	1	(0)
1995	→ Dynamo-2 Kyiv	4	(0)
1996	→ Lokomotyv Dnipropetrovsk	4	(1)
1997	→ Nyva Vinnytsia	11	(0)
1997–2001	Metalurh Mariupol	59	(5)
1998	→ Shakhtar Makiivka (loan)	4	(1)
2000–2001	→ Metalurh-2 Mariupol (loan)	26	(4)
2002–2003	Tavriya Simferopol	36	(0)
2003–2004	Dynamo Simferopol	30	(12)
2004	Vorskla Poltava	6	(1)
2005	Krymteplytsia Molodizhne	2	(0)
2006	PFC Oleksandria	6	(0)
2006–2010	Zakarpattia Uzhhorod	97	(4)

International career
2001	Ukraine (students)		
Medal record
Men's football
Representing Ukraine
Summer Universiade
Silver medal – second place	2001 Beijing	Team competition
- * Club domestic league appearances and goals

Volodymyr Braila (born 21 August 1978) is a Ukrainian footballer.
