= Fabinho (footballer, born 1982) =

Brazilian footballer

Personal information
- Full name: Fabio de Matos Pereira
- Date of birth: February 26, 1982 (age 44)
- Place of birth: Brazil
- Height: 1.69 m (5 ft 7 in)
- Position: Midfielder

Team information
- Current team: Botafogo-SP

Senior career*
Years	Team	Apps	(Gls)
2006–2007	Anorthosis Famagusta	38	(4)
2008	FC Brașov	17	(1)
2008–2010	FC Metalurh Donetsk	18	(1)
2010–2011	Ermis Aradippou	9	(1)
2011	Skonto Riga	21	(2)
2012–	Botafogo-SP		
- * Club domestic league appearances and goals

Fabio de Matos Pereira or Fabinho (born 26 February 1982, in Brazil), is a Brazilian football midfielder, currently playing for Botafogo-SP.

He played for Anorthosis Famagusta in Cyprus until January 2008, when the good qualities demonstrated at Anorthosis earned him a three-year contract with the Romanian side FC Brașov. He left FC Brașov in 2008, signing for Metalurh Donetsk in Ukraine. He signed a three-year contract. In 2010, he signed to play for Ermis Aradippou in Cyprus. In 2011, he left the Cypriot club, signing for Skonto Riga in Latvia.
