= Rubén Gómez (Argentine footballer) =

Argentine footballer

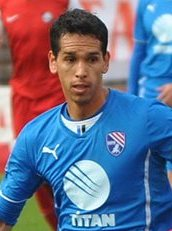

Personal information
- Full name: Rubén Marcelo Gómez Garcia
- Date of birth: 26 January 1984 (age 42)
- Place of birth: Adrogué, Argentina
- Height: 1.78 m (5 ft 10 in)
- Position: Midfielder

Senior career*
Years	Team	Apps	(Gls)
2002–2003	Belgrano	33	(2)
2003–2009	Metalurh Donetsk	32	(1)
2004	→ Metalurh-2 Donetsk	7	(1)
2005–2007	→ Stal Alchevsk (loan)	48	(1)
2008	→ Mechelen (loan)	3	(0)
2008–2009	→ Zorya Luhansk (loan)	22	(0)
2009–2010	Zakarpattia Uzhhorod	21	(2)
2010–2011	AEK Larnaca	38	(1)
2012–2014	Tavriya Simferopol	62	(1)
2014–2015	Levadiakos	22	(0)
2015–2020	Zaria Bălți		
2020–2022	CSF Bălți		
- * Club domestic league appearances and goals as of 02:47, 4 February 2024 (UTC)

Rubén Marcelo Gómez Garcia (born 26 January 1984) is an Argentine former footballer who played as a midfielder.

== Career ==
He has been attached to FC Metalurh Donetsk in Ukraine, although has been out on loan since 2005. On January 30, 2012, he signed a 3.5-year contract with SC Tavriya Simferopol.
