= Leândro (footballer, born 1983) =

Brazilian footballer

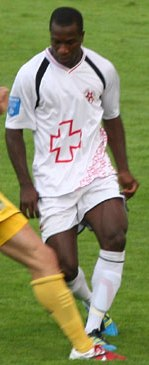
- Leândro with Volyn Lutsk in 2011

Personal information
- Full name: Leândro Messias dos Santos
- Date of birth: 29 December 1983 (age 42)
- Place of birth: Rio de Janeiro, Brazil
- Height: 1.83 m (6 ft 0 in)
- Position: Left-back

Senior career*
Years	Team	Apps	(Gls)
- Paraná
- Grêmio Maringá
- Cascavel
- Toledo
2007	Criciúma		
2007	EC Próspera		
2008	America FC		
2008	Ceará		
2008–2009	Chernomorets Burgas	4	(0)
2009–2010	Hoverla Uzhhorod	24	(0)
2010–2011	Tavriya Simferopol	13	(0)
2011–2013	Volyn Lutsk	30	(2)
2013–2014	Hoverla Uzhhorod	9	(0)
2014–2015	Korona Kielce	23	(1)
2015–2017	Górnik Łęczna	65	(2)
2017–2019	Stal Mielec	46	(1)
2019–2022	Górnik Łęczna	97	(0)
2022–2024	Stal Mielec	20	(0)
- * Club domestic league appearances and goals

Leândro Messias dos Santos (born 29 December 1983), also known just as Leândro, is a Brazilian former professional footballer who played as a left-back. He was most recently the sporting director of Stal Stalowa Wola, and previously held the same role at Górnik Łęczna.

== Personal life ==
In October 2018, he obtained Polish citizenship.

== Honours ==
Górnik Łęczna

- II liga: 2019–20
