= Valentyn Platonov =

Ukrainian footballer

Personal information
- Full name: Valentyn Viktorovych Platonov
- Date of birth: 15 January 1977 (age 49)
- Place of birth: Kryvyi Rih, Ukrainian SSR
- Position: Defender

Youth career
- Dnipropetrovsk sports boarding school

Senior career*
Years	Team	Apps	(Gls)
1994	FC Khimik Severodonetsk	6	(0)
1995–1996	FC Metalurh Novomoskovsk	46	(9)
1996	→ FC Dnipro Dnipropetrovsk (loan)	1	(0)
1996–2004	FC Kryvbas Kryvyi Rih	162	(21)
1998–2004	→ FC Kryvbas-2 Kryvyi Rih	14	(1)
2004–2006	FC Illichivets Mariupol	63	(8)
2007	FC Zorya Luhansk	24	(2)
2008	FC Vorskla Poltava	3	(0)
2008	FC Hirnyk Kryvyi Rih	9	(2)
2009	FC Zakarpattia Uzhhorod	25	(6)
2010	FC Elektrometalurh-NZF Nikopol	5	(1)
2010	FC Helios Kharkiv	20	(1)
2014–2018	FC Hirnyk-Veteran Kryvyi Rih	54	(19)

International career
1998	Ukraine U21	1	(0)

Managerial career
- 2010–????: FC Hirnyk Kryvyi Rih (academy staff)
- * Club domestic league appearances and goals

Valentyn Viktorovych Platonov (Ukrainian: Валентин Вікторович Платонов; born 15 January 1977) is a retired Ukrainian professional footballer.
