= Oleg Andronic =

Moldovan footballer

Personal information
- Date of birth: 6 February 1989 (age 37)
- Place of birth: Chișinău, Moldavian SSR, Soviet Union
- Height: 1.72 m (5 ft 7 1/2 in)
- Position: Forward

Youth career
- Zimbru Chișinău

Senior career*
| Years | Team | Apps | (Gls) |
| 2007–2011 | Zimbru Chișinău | 76 | (30) |
| 2012 | Academia Chișinău | 12 | (1) |
| 2012–2013 | Speranța Crihana Veche | 17 | (1) |
| 2013 | Zimbru Chișinău | 11 | (4) |
| 2013–2014 | Khujand | | |
| 2014 | Dinamo-Auto Tiraspol | 5 | (0) |
| 2014–2015 | Costuleni | 6 | (0) |
| 2016 | Speranța Nisporeni | 5 | (0) |
| 2016–2017 | Academia Chișinău | 24 | (4) |
| 2017 | Dacia Chișinău | 0 | (0) |
| 2017–2018 | Milsami Orhei | 17 | (2) |
| 2019 | Zimbru Chișinău | 7 | (0) |
| 2019 | Ungheni | | |

International career
| 2008–2012 | Moldova | 3 | (0) |
- * Club domestic league appearances and goals as of 12 April 2021

Oleg Andronic (born 6 February 1989) is a Moldovan footballer who plays as a forward.

== Career ==
=== Club ===
He made his debut on 16 March 2008 against Olimpia Bălţi and scored his first goal from a penalty in the same match. In 2008, he became the best scorer of the Moldovan National Division, and also was assigned by (Romanian: Federaţia Moldovenească de Fotbal) as the best forward in 2008. On 9 July 2009, he scored his first international goal against Okzhetpes for an outstanding 2–0 after a 1–2 home loss in the first qualifying round of the 2009–10 UEFA Europa League. Andronic left in December 2011 Zimbru Chișinău and joined on 21 February 2012 to Academia Chișinău.

=== International ===
Andronic played in 2008 two international friendly games for the Moldova national football team. His debut occurred in the Estonia Tournament 2008 on 18 November against Estonia national football team and his second cap was earned against Lithuania national football team, both in the A. Le Coq Arena in Tallinn.

== Personal life ==
His uncle Mihai is coach in Moldova, his elder brother is the Moldovan national player Gheorghe Andronic, his younger brother Gicu plays by FC Zimbru-2 Chișinău and his cousins Valeriu Andronic and Igor Andronic, are former members of the nationalside of Moldova.
