= Charles Newuche =

Nigerian footballer

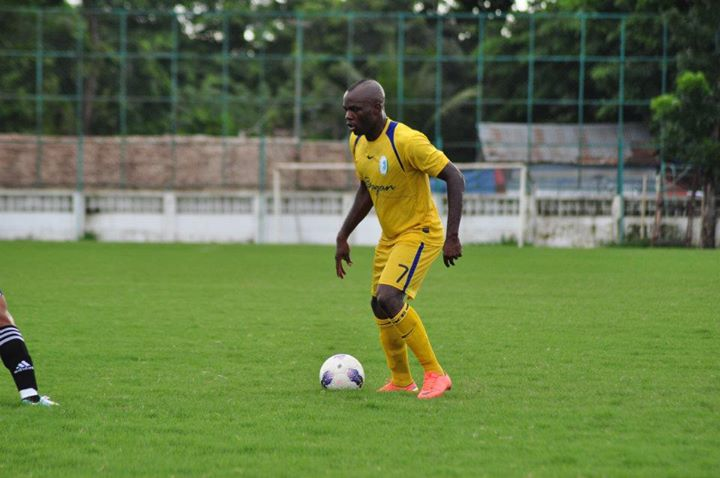

Personal information
- Full name: Charles Nnaemeka Newuche
- Date of birth: March 14, 1985 (age 41)
- Place of birth: Imo State, Nigeria
- Height: 1.83 m (6 ft 0 in)
- Position: Striker

Team information
- Current team: Marsa

Senior career*
Years	Team	Apps	(Gls)
2001–2002	Bright Stars	25	(11)
2003–2004	First Bank	26	(7)
2007	Lobi Stars	14	(9)
2008–2011	Zakarpattia Uzhhorod	92	(26)
2012–2013	Yangon United	20	(11)
2013–2014	FC Tiraspol	18	(4)
2014–2015	Kolkheti-1913 Poti	25	(10)
2015	Pietà Hotspurs	20	(11)
2015–2016	Vittoriosa Stars	?	(?)
2016	Siggiewi	?	(?)
2016–2017	Sirens	?	(?)
2017–	Marsa	?	(?)

International career
2003–2005	Nigeria U20	23	(12)
- * Club domestic league appearances and goals

Charles Nnaemeka Newuche (born 14 March 1985 in Imo State) is a Nigerian footballer who plays for Marsa.

== Career ==
Newuche was nominated for the best player of his team by the fans in the 2008/2009 season. During that season, he scored 16 times for FC Zakarpattia Uzhhorod in the Persha Liha in Ukraine.
