= Sergei Ryzhikh =

Russian-Ukrainian footballer and coach

Personal information
- Full name: Sergei Vladimirovich Ryzhikh
- Date of birth: 12 September 1979 (age 47)
- Place of birth: Horlivka, Ukrainian SSR
- Height: 1.83 m (6 ft 0 in)
- Positions: Striker; midfielder

Senior career*
Years	Team	Apps	(Gls)
2001–2005	FC SKA-Energiya Khabarovsk	150	(44)
2006–2007	FC Baltika Kaliningrad	54	(10)
2008	FC Salyut-Energia Belgorod	7	(0)
2008–2009	FC Metallurg Lipetsk	18	(5)
2009–2010	FC Zakarpattia Uzhhorod	2	(0)
2010	FC SKA-Energiya Khabarovsk	9	(1)

Managerial career
- 2012–2015: FC Helios Kharkiv (academy)
- 2015–2017: FC Helios Kharkiv (assistant)
- * Club domestic league appearances and goals

Sergei Vladimirovich Ryzhikh or Serhiy Volodymyrovych Ryzhykh (Russian: Серге́й Владимирович Рыжих; Ukrainian: Сергій Володимирович Рижих; born 12 September 1979) is a Russian-Ukrainian professional football coach and a former player.

== Honours ==
- Russian Second Division Zone East top scorer: 2001 (14 goals).
