= Igor Andronic =

Moldovan professional football player

Personal information
- Date of birth: 11 March 1988 (age 38)
- Place of birth: Chișinău, Moldavian SSR, Soviet Union
- Height: 1.73 m (5 ft 8 in)
- Position: Defender

Senior career*
Years	Team	Apps	(Gls)
2006–2010	Zimbru Chișinău	49	(0)
2010–2011	Zakarpattia Uzhhorod	5	(0)
2011–2012	Milsami	15	(0)
2012–2013	Academia Chișinău	16	(1)
2013	Zimbru Chișinău	2	(0)
2013–2014	Hapoel Afula	6	(0)
2014	Dinamo Tiraspol	3	(0)
2014–2015	Speranța Nisporeni	7	(0)
2016–2017	Speranța Nisporeni	15	(0)
2017–2018	Ungheni		
2018–2020	Codru Lozova		
2020	Victoria Bardar		

International career^{‡}
2007–2009	Moldova U-21	16	(0)
2008	Moldova	2	(0)
- * Club domestic league appearances and goals ‡ National team caps and goals as of 19:20, 16 June 2021 (UTC)

Igor Andronic (born 11 March 1988) is a Moldovan professional football player.

== Personal life ==
He is the cousin of Valeriu Andronic and also of the brothers Oleg and Gheorghe Andronic, all of whom are international footballers.

== Honours ==
Zimbru Chișinău

- Moldovan Cup: 2006–07

Milsami Orhei

- Moldovan Cup: 2011–12
