= Oleksandr Artemenko =

Ukrainian footballer

Personal information
- Full name: Oleksandr Petrovych Artemenko
- Date of birth: 19 January 1987 (age 39)
- Place of birth: Chernyshove, Crimea Oblast, Ukrainian SSR
- Height: 1.81 m (5 ft 11 1/2 in)
- Position: Forward

Youth career
- 2001−2004: UOR Simferopol

Senior career*
| Years | Team | Apps | (Gls) |
| 2005–2012 | Tavriya Simferopol | 4 | (1) |
| 2006–2007 | → Khimik Krasnoperekopsk | 40 | (1) |
| 2009 | → Zakarpattia Uzhhorod | 10 | (0) |
| 2010 | → Feniks-Illichovets Kalinine | 11 | (0) |
| 2011 | → Bukovyna Chernivtsi | 10 | (2) |
| 2013 | Karlivka | 3 | (0) |
| 2014 | Shakhtar Sverdlovsk | 3 | (1) |
| 2015 | TSK Simferopol | | |
| 2015 | Yevpatoria | | |
| 2015 | Rubin Yalta | | |
| 2016 | Ocean Kerch | | |
| 2017 | Kyzyltash Bakhchisaray | | |
- * Club domestic league appearances and goals

Oleksandr Artemenko (Ukrainian: Олександр Петрович Артеменко; born 19 January 1987) is a Ukrainian former football forward. He is a product of the Crimean football system.
