= Yaroslav Kinash =

Ukrainian footballer

Personal information
- Full name: Yaroslav Rostyslavovych Kinash
- Date of birth: 16 April 1988 (age 38)
- Place of birth: Lviv, Ukrainian SSR
- Height: 1.86 m (6 ft 1 in)
- Position: Midfielder

Team information
- Current team: Nyva Ternopil

Youth career
- 2001–2002: UFK Lviv
- 2002–2006: Sportive School #4 Lviv

Senior career*
Years	Team	Apps	(Gls)
2006–2007	Halychyna Drohobych		
2007–2014	Volyn Lutsk	116	(17)
2016–2017	Rukh Vynnyky	33	(2)
2017–2018	Volyn Lutsk	5	(1)
2019	Nyva Ternopil	5	(1)
2019	Sambir		
2020	Torpedo Yerevan		
2021–	Nyva Ternopil		
- * Club domestic league appearances and goals as of 21:23, 27 June 2019 (UTC)

Yaroslav Rostyslavovych Kinash (Ukrainian: Ярослав Ростиславович Кінаш; born 16 April 1988 in Lviv, Ukrainian SSR) is a professional Ukrainian football midfielder who plays for Nyva Ternopil.

== Career ==
Kinash began his playing career in sportive school in native town Lviv. Than after short time in FC Halychyna in Amateur League he joined to FC Volyn Lutsk team. He made his first team debut entering against FC Obolon Kyiv on 20 March 2007.
