= Artem Semenenko =

Ukrainian professional footballer (born 1988)

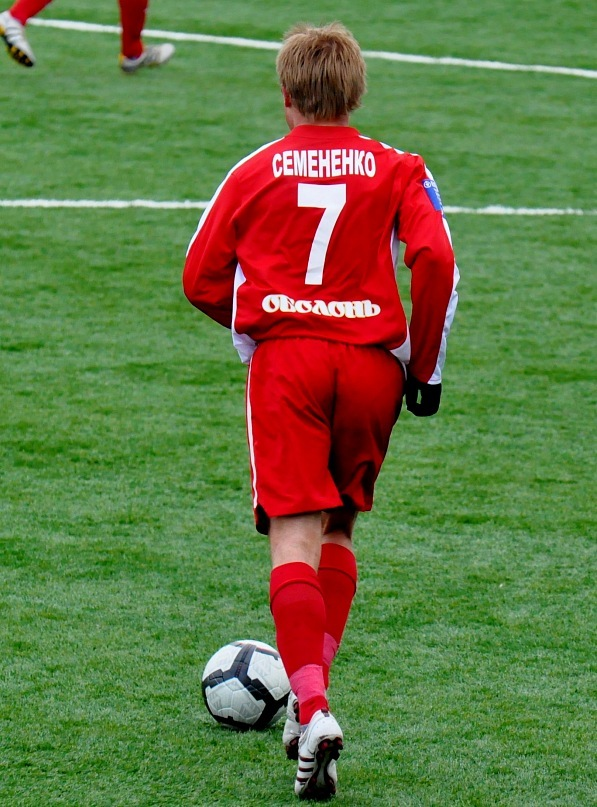

Personal information
- Date of birth: 2 September 1988 (age 38)
- Place of birth: Kiev, Ukrainian SSR, Soviet Union
- Height: 1.75 m (5 ft 9 in)
- Positions: Defensive midfielder; centre back

Youth career
- Metalurh Zaporizhzhia Youth

Senior career*
Years	Team	Apps	(Gls)
2004–2009	Metalurh Zaporizhzhia	8	(0)
2004–2007	→ Metalurh-2 Zaporizhzhia	28	(0)
2010–2012	Zorya Luhansk	21	(0)
2012–2013	Politehnica Iași	10	(0)
2013	Poltava	12	(1)
2014	Naftovyk-Ukrnafta	3	(0)
2014–2021	Tavria-Skif Rozdol	45	(1)
Total		127	(2)

International career^{‡}
2005	Ukraine U17	2	(0)
2009–2010	Ukraine U21	2	(0)
- * Club domestic league appearances and goals as of 28 March 2015 ‡ National team caps and goals as of 12 August 2012

Artem Semenenko (Ukrainian: Семененко Артем Андрійович; born 2 September 1988) is a Ukrainian former professional footballer.

== Career ==
Artem Semenko is a product of Metalurh Zaporizhzhia Youth school system, where he was trained by Yevheniy Bulhakov. He game his debut for the senior team on 17 June 2005, in a home match against Borysfen Boryspil.

In February 2010 Semenko moved on a free transfer to Premier League side Zorya Luhansk.

In August 2012, after two and a half years at Zorya, Semenenko joined Romanian Liga I team CSMS Iași on a one-year contract.
