= Leandro Almeida (footballer) =

Brazilian footballer

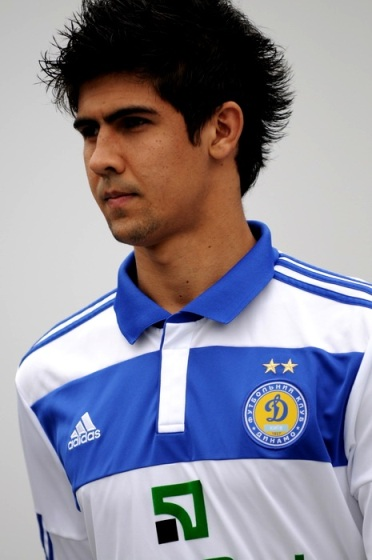

Personal information
- Full name: Leandro Almeida da Silva
- Date of birth: 14 March 1987 (age 39)
- Place of birth: Belo Horizonte, Brazil
- Height: 1.88 m (6 ft 2 in)
- Position: Central defender

Team information
- Current team: Xagħra United
- Number: 4

Youth career
- 2005–2006: Atlético Mineiro

Senior career*
Years	Team	Apps	(Gls)
2007–2009	Atlético Mineiro	99	(14)
2009–2013	Dynamo Kyiv	70	(3)
2013–2015	Coritiba	88	(6)
2015–2019	Palmeiras	15	(0)
2016	→ Internacional (loan)	2	(0)
2017	→ Figueirense (loan)	29	(0)
2018	→ Londrina (loan)	14	(1)
2019	→ Paraná (loan)	27	(1)
2020	Guarani	4	(0)
2020-2022	Hibernians	60	(2)
2022-2023	Żebbuġ Rangers	23	(0)
2023-2024	Xagħra United		
- * Club domestic league appearances and goals as of 25 June 2023

Leandro Almeida da Silva (born 14 March 1987), or simply Leandro Almeida, is a Brazilian footballer who plays as a central defender for Xagħra United.

== Career ==
Almeida made his professional debut for Atlético Mineiro in a 1–1 home draw against Atlético-PR in the Campeonato Brasileiro on 2 June 2006 and scored his first professional goal for Atlético Mineiro in a 1–2 away defeat to Figueirense in the Campeonato Brasileiro on 8 September 2007.

On 24 June 2009 Leandro Almeida transferred to Dynamo Kyiv.

== Honours ==
Atlético Mineiro

- Campeonato Mineiro: 2007

Coritiba

- Campeonato Paranaense: 2013

Hibernians

- Maltese Premier League: 2022
