= Aurimas Kučys =

Lithuanian footballer

Personal information
- Date of birth: 22 February 1981 (age 45)
- Place of birth: Panevėžys, Lithuanian SSR, Soviet Union
- Height: 1.89 m (6 ft 2 1/2 in)
- Position: Midfielder

Senior career*
Years	Team	Apps	(Gls)
1998–2006	FK Ekranas	213	(25)
2007	Daugava Daugavpils	21	(3)
2008–2009	Naftovyk-Ukrnafta Okhtyrka	20	(1)
2009	FC Zakarpattia Uzhhorod	5	(0)
2009–2013	FK Ekranas	85	(14)
2014	FK Daugava Rīga	27	(6)
Total		371	(49)

International career
2002–2009	Lithuania	17	(0)
- * Club domestic league appearances and goals

Aurimas Kučys (born 22 February 1981) is a Lithuanian former professional football midfielder.

== International career ==
Kučys has represented Lithuania at under-21 level. He has also made 17 appearances for the senior Lithuania national football team.

== Personal life ==
His son Armandas Kučys is also a football player.

== Playing career ==
1998	(Lithuania) FK Ekranas Panevezys	A Lyga 1st level	4/0*
1999	(Lithuania) FK Ekranas Panevezys	A Lyga 1st level	16/1
2000	(Lithuania) FK Ekranas Panevezys	A Lyga 1st level	34/8
2001	(Lithuania) FK Ekranas Panevezys	A Lyga 1st level	33/2
2002	(Lithuania) FK Ekranas Panevezys	A Lyga 1st level	27/3
2003	(Lithuania) FK Ekranas Panevezys	A Lyga 1st level	24/4
2004	(Lithuania) FK Ekranas Panevezys	A Lyga 1st level	25/2
2005	(Lithuania) FK Ekranas Panevezys	A Lyga 1st level	17/4
2006	(Lithuania) FK Ekranas Panevezys	A Lyga 1st level	33/1
2007	(Latvia) FK Daugava Daugavpils	Virsliga 1st level	21/3
2008	(Ukraine) Naftovyk	Premier League 1st level	10/1
2009	(Ukraine) Naftovyk	Pesrha Liha 2nd level	10/0
2009	(Ukraine) Hoverla	Premier League 1st level	5/0
2010	(Lithuania) FK Ekranas Panevezys	A Lyga 1st level	24/5
2011	(Lithuania) FK Ekranas Panevezys	A Lyga 1st level	28/4
2012	(Lithuania) FK Ekranas Panevezys	A Lyga 1st level	28/5
2013	(Lithuania) FK Ekranas Panevezys	A Lyga 1st level	5/0
2014	(Latvia) FK Daugava Rīga	Virsliga 1st level	27/6

* - played games and goals

== Honours ==
Ekranas Panevezys

- A Lyga
  - 2005, 2010, 2011, 2012
- Lithuanian Football Cup
  - 2000, 2010, 2011

National Team

- Baltic Cup
  - 2005
