= Dmytro Nevmyvaka =

Ukrainian footballer

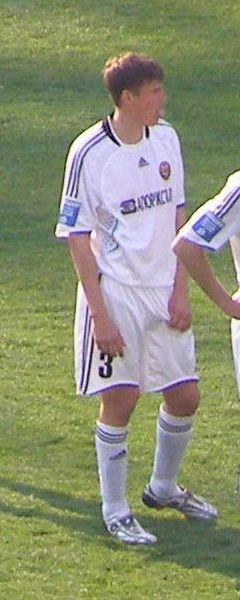
- Nevmyvanka in 2010

Personal information
- Full name: Dmytro Vasylyovych Nevmyvaka
- Date of birth: 19 March 1984 (age 42)
- Place of birth: Zaporizhzhia, Ukrainian SSR
- Height: 1.91 m (6 ft 3 in)
- Position: Defender

Youth career
- 1998–2001: Metalurh Zaporizhzhia

Senior career*
| Years | Team | Apps | (Gls) |
| 2001–2004 | Metalurh-2 Zaporuzhya | 62 | (5) |
| 2003–2010 | Metalurh Zaporizhzhia | 120 | (8) |
| 2010–2013 | Illichivets Mariupol | 32 | (2) |
| 2014 | Gomel | 29 | (0) |
| 2015 | Granit Mikashevichi | 24 | (1) |
| 2016–2018 | Tavria-Skif Rozdol | 57 | (12) |

International career^{‡}
| 2004–2006 | Ukraine U21 | 13 | (1) |
Medal record
Men's football
Representing Ukraine
UEFA European Under-21 Championship
| Runner-up | 2006 Portugal |
- * Club domestic league appearances and goals as of 31 December 2018 ‡ National team caps and goals as of 22 April 2010

Dmytro Vasylyovych Nevmyvaka (Ukrainian: Дмитро Васильович Невмивака; born 19 March 1984) is a Ukrainian former professional football player. He started his career for FC Metalurh Zaporizhzhia in 2003.
