= Oleksandr Kovpak =

Ukrainian footballer

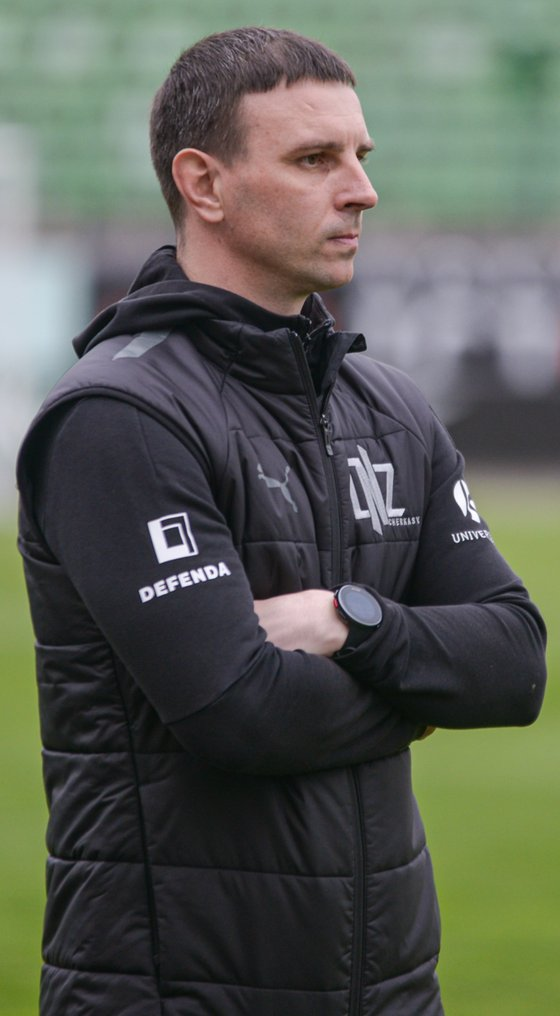
- Kovpak in 2023

Personal information
- Full name: Oleksandr Oleksandrovych Kovpak
- Date of birth: 2 February 1983 (age 43)
- Place of birth: Smila, Ukrainian SSR
- Height: 1.80 m (5 ft 11 in)
- Position: Forward

Youth career
- 1997–2002: Sports school (Smila)

Senior career*
Years	Team	Apps	(Gls)
2002–2005	Dnipro Cherkasy	47	(22)
2005–2010	Tavriya Simferopol	142	(41)
2011–2013	Arsenal Kyiv	53	(13)
2013–2014	Sevastopol	25	(7)
2014–2016	Vorskla Poltava	41	(10)
2016–2017	Cherkaskyi Dnipro	18	(4)
2017–2018	Poltava	26	(10)
2018	Desna Chernihiv	7	(0)
2019	Arsenal Kyiv	13	(3)
2019	Chornomorets Odesa	7	(0)
2020	Polissya Zhytomyr	0	(0)
2020–2021	LNZ Cherkasy	5	

International career
2005	Ukraine U21	1	(0)
2013	Ukraine	3	(0)

Managerial career
- 2020–2022: LNZ Cherkasy (assistant)
- 2022–2023: LNZ Cherkasy
- 2025–2026: Obolon Kyiv (assistant)
- * Club domestic league appearances and goals

Oleksandr Oleksandrovich Kovpak (Ukrainian: Олександр Олександрович Ковпак; born 2 February 1983) is a retired Ukrainian footballer and current manager.

== Career ==
He moved to Tavriya in the winter of 2005 from Dnipro Cherkassy.

Kovpak become the top goalscorer of the Ukrainian Premier League 2008-09 with Tavriya, having netted 17 goals.

The head coach of Ukraine's national team Oleksiy Mykhailychenko called him into the Ukrainian squad for the 2010 World Cup qualifying games versus Croatia and Kazakhstan on 6 June 2009 and 10 June 2009 respectively, but he remained an unused substitute for these matches. He finally made his debut on 2 June 2013, in the 0:0 draw with Cameroon in a friendly match after coming on as a late replacement for Roman Zozulya. With all three games, he spent on the pitch a total of 14–15 minutes.

During the winter break of the 2010–11 Ukrainian Premier League season he transferred to Arsenal Kyiv.

== Career statistics ==
As of 10 July 2011

Club	Season	League		Cup		Europe		Super Cup		Total	
Club	Season	Apps	Goals	Apps	Goals	Apps	Goals	Apps	Goals	Apps	Goals
Tavriya Simferopol	2004–05	14	6	0	0	0	0	0	0	14	6
Tavriya Simferopol	2005–06	22	5	0	0	0	0	0	0	22	5
Tavriya Simferopol	2006–07	26	2	4	1	0	0	0	0	30	3
Tavriya Simferopol	2007–08	26	3	4	0	0	0	0	0	30	3
Tavriya Simferopol	2008–09	28	17	2	1	3	0	0	0	33	18
Tavriya Simferopol	2009–10	25	8	5	5	0	0	0	0	30	13
Tavriya Simferopol	2010–11	14	5	1	0	0	0	1	0	16	5
Arsenal Kyiv	2010–11	9	1	1	0	0	0	0	0	10	1
Arsenal Kyiv	2011–12	0	0	0	0	0	0	0	0	0	0
Total		165	47	17	7	3	0	1	0	186	54
