= Saša Đuričić =

Bosnia Croat footballer

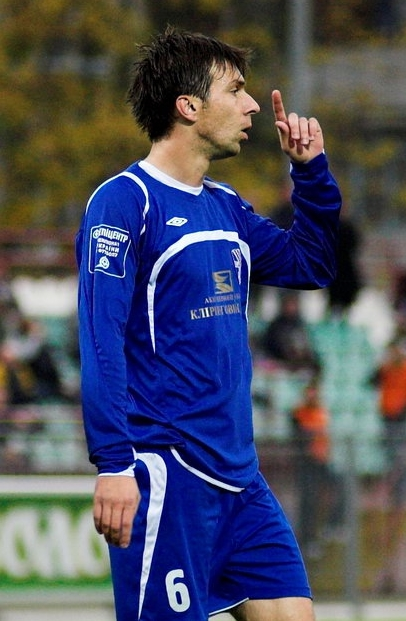

Personal information
- Full name: Saša Đuričić
- Date of birth: August 1, 1979 (age 47)
- Place of birth: Sarajevo, SFR Yugoslavia
- Height: 1.86 m (6 ft 1 in)
- Position: Defender

Senior career*
Years	Team	Apps	(Gls)
2000–2001	Hajduk Kula	0	(0)
2001–2002	Uskok Klis		
2002–2005	Široki Brijeg		
2005–2008	Vorskla Poltava	60	(3)
2009–2011	Tavriya Simferopol	64	(0)
- * Club domestic league appearances and goals as of June 29, 2010

Saša Đuričić (born 1 August 1979 in Sarajevo, Yugoslavia) is a retired Croatian football defender who last played for Tavriya Simferopol in the Ukrainian Premier League.

== Club career ==
He started his professional football career at FK Hajduk Kula in Serbia. He spent the first half of the 2000/2001 season on loan at Ljubljana Football Club in the Slovenian second football league.

After that, he returned to Croatia, where he moved to NK Uskok Klis. From 2002 to 2005, he defended the colors of the Bosnian team NK Široki Brijeg. As part of the team, he won the bronze medal at the championship of Bosnia and Herzegovina and made his debut in the European competition for the first time.

In the summer of 2005, he arrived in Ukrainian FC Volyn Lutsk for a trial, where he was invited by head coach Vitaliy Kvartsyanyi. Since he was new to the Luck team, they noticed FC Vorskla from Poltava, with whom he signed a contract in August 2005..He made his debut in the championship of Ukraine on August 21, 2005 in a home match against Dinamo Kyiv (0:4). In total, he played 60 matches for Vorskla in the Ukrainian championship and scored 3 goals, and he also played 9 matches and scored 1 goal in the Ukrainian Cup.

In January 2009, he moved to SC Tavriya Simferopol, signing a two-year contract. He terminated his contract with Tavrija on October 31, 2011.

He finished his football career at the camp of NK Uskok Klis team.

The biggest sports successes are

- winning the championship of Bosnia and Herzegovina with NK Široki Brijeg, 2004/2005
- winning the Ukrainian Cup twice with SC Tavriya Simferopol: 2008/2009 and 2009/2010.

In the elite Ukrainian division, he played 57 matches and scored two goals.

He lives and works in Split. He is active in the Split Football Association.

Data on participation in the Veterans League, total, Šimić dom.

Season	Performs	Goals
2014/2015	21	4
2015/2016	13	2
2016/2017	20	3
2017/2018	24	6
2018/2019	26	11
2019/2020	24	7
2020/2021	1	0
2021/2022	15	7
