= Dmytro Babenko =

Ukrainian footballer (born 1978)

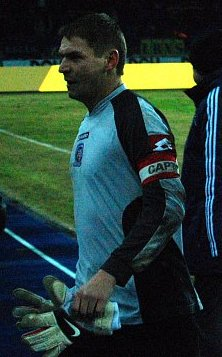
- Babenko in 2010

Personal information
- Full name: Dmytro Olehovych Babenko
- Date of birth: 28 June 1978 (age 48)
- Place of birth: Luhansk, Ukrainian SSR, Soviet Union
- Height: 1.81 m (5 ft 11 in)
- Position: Goalkeeper

Team information
- Current team: Veres Rivne (goalkeeping coach)

Senior career*
Years	Team	Apps	(Gls)
1995–1997	Khimik Sieverodonetsk	9	(0)
1997–2005	Zorya Luhansk	178	(0)
2006–2016	Hoverla Uzhhorod	164	(0)
2016	Lietava	8	(0)
2017–2019	Mynai	19	(0)
Total		378	(0)

Managerial career
- 2017–2019: Mynai (goalkeeping coach)
- 2019–: Veres Rivne (goalkeeping coach)
- * Club domestic league appearances and goals as of 8 December 2021

Dmytro Olehovych Babenko (Ukrainian: Дмитро Олегович Бабенко; born 28 June 1978) is a Ukrainian former footballer and current manager who is a goalkeeping coach at Veres Rivne.
