= Aleksandar Trišović =

Serbian footballer

Personal information
- Full name: Aleksandar Trišović
- Date of birth: 25 November 1983 (age 42)
- Place of birth: Kraljevo, SFR Yugoslavia
- Height: 1.82 m (5 ft 11 1/2 in)
- Position: Midfielder

Youth career
- Sloga Kraljevo
- Mačva Šabac
- OFK Beograd

Senior career*
Years	Team	Apps	(Gls)
2001–2004	OFK Beograd	39	(0)
2004–2005	Volyn Lutsk	44	(7)
2006	Kryvbas Kryvyi Rih	24	(1)
2007–2008	Red Star Belgrade	25	(0)
2008–2011	Metalist Kharkiv	24	(1)
2009	→ Chornomorets Odesa (loan)	4	(0)
2009–2010	→ Zakarpattia Uzhhorod (loan)	18	(2)
2011–2013	Hoverla Uzhhorod	24	(1)
2013–2014	Radnički Niš	12	(1)
2015	Zeta Golubovci	16	(1)
2016	Sloga Kraljevo		

International career
2006–2007	Serbia	5	(1)

Managerial career
- 2023-2024: Sloga Kraljevo
- * Club domestic league appearances and goals

Aleksandar Trišović (Serbian Cyrillic: Александар Тришовић; born 25 November 1983) is a Serbian retired footballer.

== Club career ==
Trišović started playing football with his hometown team FK Sloga Kraljevo, before transferring to FK Mačva Šabac. At the age of 16 he was on the move again, this time to OFK Beograd.

=== OFK Beograd ===
Shortly before his 18th birthday, Trišović cracked OFK's first team. During his debut season in the club's top squad, 2001/02, he appeared in 14 league matches.

He soon developed into a dependable left midfielder capable of delivering a quality cross. In the next season, he appeared in 21 league matches.

His final season at OFK, 2003–04 turned out to be a disappointment with only 4 league appearances. In 2004, he was sold to Ukrainian Vyshcha Liha club FC Volyn Lutsk.

=== Volyn Lutsk ===
His single season with Volyn turned out to be very successful with 7 goals from 28 league appearances. That led to a transfer to another Ukrainian club FC Kryvbas Kryvyi Rih.

=== Kryvbas ===
While playing for Kryvbas, he received a call from Javier Clemente to represent Serbia in its first inaugural match as a new independent country and national team. Serbia was facing the Czech Republic and eventually won by the score of 3–1. Trišović scored a goal on his debut and at the same time caught the eye of Serbian giants Red Star.

=== Red Star Belgrade ===
A move to Red Star followed shortly after in August 2006. However, Trišović's season and a half for the Belgrade club largely proved to be a disappointment.

He was getting playing time with 21 league appearances in the 2006–07 season while the club was coached by Dušan Bajević, but when he walked out in March 2007, Trišović lost his first team place under new head coach Boško Đurovski.

The next season 2007–08 saw him make only 4 league appearances before being transferred back to Ukraine in January 2008, this time to FC Metalist Kharkiv.

=== Metalist Kharkiv ===
After moving to Kharkiv during the 2007–08 winter transfer window Trišović played 7 matches in the second half of the Ukrainian season. In the first half of the following, 2008–09, season he played 14 league matches and scored 1 goal. In February 2009 he was loaned out to another Vyshcha Liha club Chornomorets Odesa for the remainder of that season. In his debut league game for Chornomorets on 1 March, he earned a red card, as the team lost 0–3 to Karpaty Lviv. In the summer of 2009 he was loaned out to another Vyshcha Liha club Zakarpattia Uzhhorod, where he was one of the key players. He returned to Metalist at the end of his loan and played for one league match against Kryvbas in the 2010–11 season.

== International career ==
On the national level, Trišović made his debut for Serbia in an August 2006 friendly match against the Czech Republic and earned a total of 5 caps, scoring a goal on his debut.
