= Yevhen Lysytsyn =

Ukrainian footballer

Personal information
- Full name: Yevhen Anatoliyovych Lysytsyn
- Date of birth: 16 July 1981 (age 45)
- Place of birth: Voroshilovgrad, Ukrainian SSR
- Height: 1.72 m (5 ft 7 1/2 in)
- Position: Midfielder

Youth career
- FC Zorya Luhansk

Senior career*
| Years | Team | Apps | (Gls) |
| 1997–1998 | FC Avanhard Rovenky | 4 | (0) |
| 1999 | FC Shakhtar Luhansk | | |
| 2000 | FC Dynamo Stakhanov | | |
| 2000–2001 | FC Ellada Luhansk | | |
| 2001 | FC Spartak Moscow | 1 | (0) |
| 2002–2003 | FC Fakel-Voronezh | 25 | (1) |
| 2004–2005 | FC Terek Grozny | 2 | (0) |
| 2005 | FC Stal Dniprodzerzhynsk | 13 | (0) |
| 2007–2009 | FC Stal Alchevsk | 37 | (3) |
| 2010–2011 | FC Zakarpattia Uzhhorod | 27 | (3) |
| 2011–2012 | MFC Mykolaiv | 20 | (2) |
| 2012–2013 | FC Helios Kharkiv | 18 | (0) |
| 2013 | FC Popasna | | |
- * Club domestic league appearances and goals

Yevhen Anatoliyovych Lysytsyn (Ukrainian: Євген Анатолійович Лисицин; Russian: Евгений Анатольевич Лисицын; born 16 July 1981) is a former Ukrainian professional footballer.

== Club career ==
He made his debut in the Russian Premier League in 2001 for FC Spartak Moscow.

== Honours ==
- Russian Premier League champion: 2001.
