= Viktor Shvetsov =

Ukrainian professional football referee (born 1969)

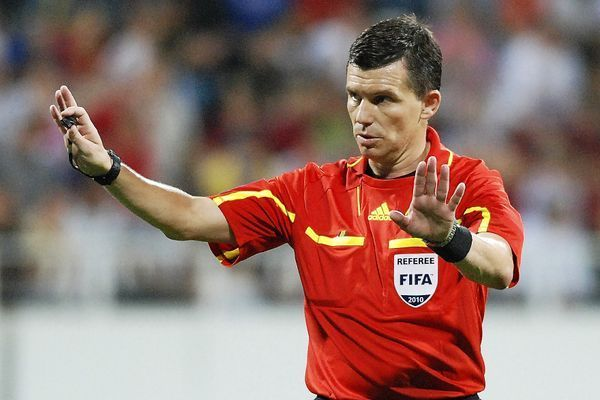
- Full name: Viktor Borysovych Shvetsov
- Born: 22 June 1969 (age 57); Odesa, Ukraine SSR

Domestic
Years	League	Role
2004-	Ukrainian Premier League	Referee

International
Years	League	Role
2008–	FIFA listed	Referee

Viktor Borysovych Shvetsov (Ukrainian: Віктор Борисович Швецов, born 22 June 1969 in Odesa, Ukraine) is a Ukrainian professional football referee. He has been a full international for FIFA since 2008.

He served as a Fourth official at the Euro 2012.
