= Andriy Boyko =

Ukrainian football defender

Personal information
- Full name: Andriy Borysovych Boyko
- Date of birth: 27 April 1981 (age 45)
- Place of birth: Bila Tserkva, Ukrainian SSR
- Height: 1.90 m (6 ft 3 in)
- Position: Defender

Senior career*
| Years | Team | Apps | (Gls) |
| 1998–2002 | Ros Bila Tserkva | 111 | (13) |
| 2003–2005 | Illichivets Mariupol | 70 | (2) |
| 2006 | Kryvbas Kryvyi Rih | 4 | (0) |
| 2006 | Stal Alchevsk | 5 | (0) |
| 2007 | Zakarpattia Uzhhorod | 7 | (0) |
| 2007–2008 | Tavriya Simferopol | 27 | (0) |
| 2009 | Vorskla Poltava | 7 | (1) |
| 2010–2011 | Zakarpattia Uzhhorod | 31 | (1) |
| 2011–2012 | Metalurh Zaporizhzhia | 27 | (2) |
| 2013 | Helios Kharkiv | 10 | (0) |
| 2014 | Trat | 15 | (1) |
| 2015 | Udon Thani | | |
| 2016 | Gvardeyets Gvardeyskoye | 2 | (0) |
| 2016 | Krymteplytsia Molodizhne | 9 | (0) |
- * Club domestic league appearances and goals

Andriy Borysovych Boyko (Ukrainian: Андрій Борисович Бойко; born 27 April 1981) is a Ukrainian former football defender.
