= David Andronic =

Moldovan professional footballer

Personal information
- Full name: David Andronic
- Date of birth: July 9, 1995 (age 31)
- Place of birth: Chișinău, Moldova
- Height: 1.86 m (6 ft 1 in)
- Position: Midfielder

Youth career
- 2002–2003: FC Dynamo Moscow
- 2011–2013: Buiucani-Dacia U-18

Senior career*
Years	Team	Apps	(Gls)
2013–2014	Dacia-2/CSCA Buiucani		
2014–2015	Veris Chișinău	5	(0)
2015–2017	Speranța Nisporeni	39	(3)
2017–2018	FK Atlantas	15	(1)
2018–2019	Lamia	3	(0)
2019	Trikala	4	(0)
2019	Milsami Orhei	0	(0)
2020	Resovia	0	(0)
2020–2021	Olimpia Grudziądz	22	(0)

International career
2013	Moldova U19	5	(0)
2015–2016	Moldova U21	10	(0)
- * Club domestic league appearances and goals as of 15 October 2021

David Andronic (Russian: Давид Андроник, born 9 July 1995) is a Moldovan professional footballer.

== Career ==
=== Resovia ===
After a spell with FC Milsami Orhei, it was confirmed on 29 January 2020, that Andronic had joined Polish club Resovia after playing three friendly games for the club. However, less than one month later, the club announced that he wouldn't join the club anyway, due to formal and legal reasons.

=== Olimpia Grudziądz ===
On 5 June 2020, he joined Olimpia Grudziądz.
