= Serhiy Motuz =

Ukrainian footballer

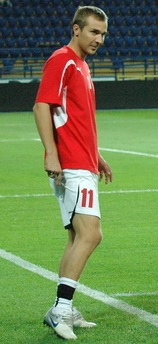

Personal information
- Full name: Serhiy Serhiyovich Motuz
- Date of birth: 6 June 1982 (age 44)
- Place of birth: Dnipropetrovsk, Soviet Union
- Height: 1.78 m (5 ft 10 in)
- Position: Striker

Youth career
- Dnipro

Senior career*
Years	Team	Apps	(Gls)
1997–2003	Dynamo Kyiv	0	(0)
1998–2001	→ Dynamo-3 Kyiv	52	(6)
1999–2002	→ Dynamo-2 Kyiv	25	(2)
2002	→ Zakarpattia Uzhhorod (loan)	8	(0)
2002	→ Zakarpattia-2 Uzhhorod (loan)	1	(0)
2002–2003	→ Obolon Kyiv (loan)	12	(1)
2002–2003	→ Obolon-2 Kyiv (loan)	2	(0)
2003	Vorskla Poltava	10	(0)
2003	→ Vorskla-2 Poltava	3	(0)
2004–2009	Dnipro Dnipropetrovsk	20	(0)
2004	→ Dnipro-2 Dnipropetrovsk	5	(0)
2007–2009	→ Kryvbas Kryvyi Rih (loan)	55	(12)
2010–2012	Kryvbas Kryvyi Rih	8	(0)
2011	→ Naftovyk-Ukrnafta Okhtyrka (loan)	9	(7)
2012	→ Naftovyk-Ukrnafta Okhtyrka (loan)	6	(0)
2013	Oleksandriya	2	(0)
- * Club domestic league appearances and goals as of 5 May 2013

Serhiy Motuz (Ukrainian: Сергій Сергійович Мотуз; born 6 June 1982) is a Ukrainian former footballer who played as a striker.
