= Lucky Idahor =

Nigerian footballer (born 1980)

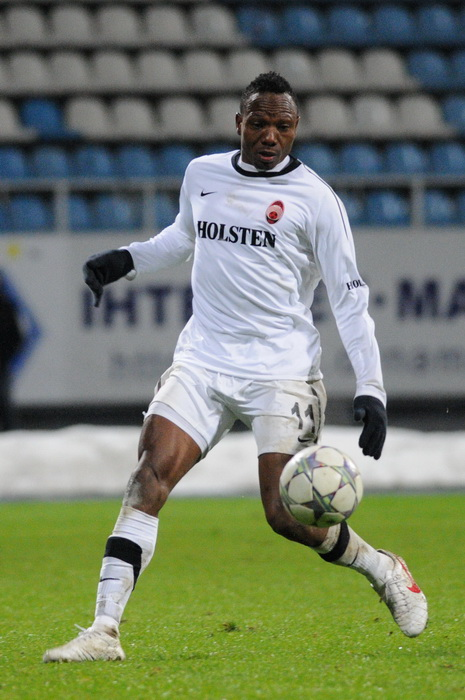

Personal information
- Full name: Lucky Issy Idahor
- Date of birth: 30 August 1980 (age 46)
- Place of birth: Benin City, Nigeria
- Height: 1.90 m (6 ft 3 in)
- Position: Striker

Youth career
- Mobil Pegasus

Senior career*
Years	Team	Apps	(Gls)
1999	Plateau United	26	(12)
2000	Iwuanyanwu Nationale	22	(10)
2001–2003	Dynamo Kyiv	27	(5)
2001–2003	→ Dynamo-2 Kyiv	49	(10)
2001	→ Dynamo-3 Kyiv	4	(3)
2003–2004	Vorskla Poltava	14	(5)
2004–2006	Inter Baku	30	(8)
2006–2007	Karpaty Lviv	10	(0)
2007–2011	Tavriya Simferopol	131	(38)
2012–2013	Zorya Luhansk	38	(5)

International career^{‡}
1999–2002	Nigeria	2	(0)
- * Club domestic league appearances and goals as of 12 August 2026 ‡ National team caps and goals as of 12 August 2026

Lucky Issy Idahor (born 30 August 1980) is a Nigerian football striker, who last played for FC Zorya Luhansk in Ukraine.

== Career ==
He signed for Tavriya in January 2007, having previously played for FC Karpaty Lviv, Inter Baku and Vorskla Poltava. Idahor began his European career in 2000 with FC Dynamo Kyiv, for whom he played in the UEFA Champions League. Idahor scored winning goal for Tavriya in Ukrainian Cup final 2010 against Metalurh Donetsk.

== Career statistics ==
As of Match played 1 December 2013

Club performance			League		Cup		Continental		Total	
Season	Club	League	Apps	Goals	Apps	Goals	Apps	Goals	Apps	Goals
2001-02	Dynamo Kyiv	Ukrainian Premier League	19	5			0	0	19	5
2002-03	Dynamo Kyiv	Ukrainian Premier League	8	0			7	2	15	2
2003-04	Vorskla Poltava	Ukrainian Premier League	14	5			-		14	5
2004-05	Inter Baku	Azerbaijan Premier League	11	2			-		11	2
2005-06	Inter Baku	Azerbaijan Premier League	19	6			-		19	6
2006-07	Karpaty Lviv	Ukrainian Premier League	10	0			-		10	0
2006-07	Tavriya Simferopol	Ukrainian Premier League	11	5			-		11	5
2007-08	Tavriya Simferopol	Ukrainian Premier League	30	7			-		30	7
2008-09	Tavriya Simferopol	Ukrainian Premier League	26	7			-		26	7
2009-10	Tavriya Simferopol	Ukrainian Premier League	25	5	4	0	-		29	5
2010-11	Tavriya Simferopol	Ukrainian Premier League	30	13	2	1	2	1	34	15
2011-12	Tavriya Simferopol	Ukrainian Premier League	9	1	1	0	-		10	1
2011-12	Zorya Luhansk	Ukrainian Premier League	10	2	1	0	-		11	2
2012-13	Zorya Luhansk	Ukrainian Premier League	25	3	1	0	-		26	3
2013-14	Zorya Luhansk	Ukrainian Premier League	3	0	0	0	-		3	0
Total	Ukraine		220	53	9	1	9	3	238	57
Total	Azerbaijan		30	8			-		30	8
Career total			250	61	9	1	9	3	268	65
