= 2012–13 FC Karpaty Lviv season =

Karpaty Lviv
2012–13 season
- Chairman: (Ukraine) Petro Dyminsky
- Manager: (Ukraine) Yuriy Dyachuk-Stavytskyi
- Stadium: Ukraina Stadium, Lviv
- Premier League: 14th
- Ukrainian Cup: Quarterfinal
- Top goalscorer: League: Lucas Pérez (8); All: Lucas Pérez (8)
- Highest home attendance: 25,850 vs Dynamo; 13 April 2013
- Lowest home attendance: 0 (ban) vs Dnipro; 12 May 2013

The 2012–13 FC Karpaty Lviv season was the 50th season in club history.

== Review and events ==
=== Background ===
Karpaty Lviv began pre-season training on 6 June 2012. On 8 June 2012, the club announced that Andriy Tlumak and Taras Petrivskiy will leave FC Karpaty having received free-agent status.

On 7 December 2012 Polish defender Jakub Tosik left the club with a scandal, stating that he will never set a foot on Ukrainian land and calling club officials "bastards and thieves". Tosik appeared in 5 matches before he was suspended from the first team for unknown reasons.

On 27 May 2013 at FC Karpaty season review meeting it was decided to transfer list 19 players due to club's unsatisfactory results. Also measures of material influence were imposed on all members of the team.

=== Season ===
Karpaty opened their 20th top-tier national championship season with a 1–1 away draw against Volyn Lutsk in the so-called "Wild West Derby". This was the first ever draw between the two clubs in 17 official matches.

=== Restructuring ===
On 20 September 2012 Petro Dyminsky, an honorary president of Karpaty Lviv, officially passed management authority over the club to the club's supporters, thus making green'n'whites a first Ukrainian football club to do so. Petro Dyminsky stated that the strategic goal of the reorganization of FC Karpaty is a clear understanding that the club should not depend on private funds of founders, but to eventually obtain independent financial stability instead.

== Competitions ==
=== Friendly matches ===
==== Pre-season ====
19 June 2012 Friendly match	Karpaty Lviv	4–0	Rukh Vynnyky	Lviv
	Balažic 32'; Holodyuk 33'; Kasyan; Martynyuk			Stadium: Ukraina Stadium

26 June 2012 Friendly match	Baník Ostrava (Czech Republic)	0–1	Karpaty Lviv	Wodzisław Śląski, Poland
18:00			Kasyan 45'	Stadium: Odra Stadium

29 June 2012 Friendly match	Śląsk Wrocław (Poland)	1–3	Karpaty Lviv	Kluczbork, Poland
18:00	Mila 86' (pen.)		Grodzicki 18' (o.g.); Tkachuk 49'; Ksyonz 67'	Stadium: Stadion Miejski; Referee: Yacek Babiarz (Poland)

3 July 2012 Friendly match	Cracovia (Poland)	0–1	Karpaty Lviv	Kraków, Poland
19:00			Tkachuk 34'	Stadium: Marshal Józef Piłsudski Stadium

7 July 2012 Friendly match	Ruch Chorzów (Poland)	1–3	Karpaty Lviv	Wodzisław Śląski, Poland
	Włodyka 87'		Kasyan 50', 67'; Lucas 60'	Stadium: Odra Stadium

==== Mid-season ====
8 September 2012 Friendly match	Karpaty Lviv	2–2	Volyn Lutsk	Lviv
18:00	Martynyuk 51'; Kasyan 80'	Report	Subotić 15', 18'	Stadium: Ukraina Stadium; Referee: Andriy Hrysyo

==== Winter break ====
30 January 2013 Friendly match	Partizan (Serbia)	1–0	Karpaty Lviv	Belek, Turkey
17:30	Šćepović 42'	Report		Stadium: Pitch of Maxx Royal Hotel

2 February 2013 Friendly match	Litex Lovech (Bulgaria)	1–1	Karpaty Lviv	Topkapi, Turkey
17:30	Isa 86'	Report	Gladkiy 55'

6 February 2013 Friendly match	Senica (Slovakia)	0–2	Karpaty Lviv	Antalya, Turkey
15:30		Report	Gladkiy 12', 24'

13 February 2013 Friendly match	Maribor (Slovenia)	2–0	Karpaty Lviv	Belek, Turkey
17:30	Mezga 51'; Berić 74'	Report		Referee: Ruslan Duzmanbetov (Kazakhstan)

16 February 2013 Friendly match	OFK Belgrade (Serbia)	2–2	Karpaty Lviv	Belek, Turkey
15:30	Batioja 3'; Nikolić 63' (pen.)	Report	Gladkiy 39' (pen.); Khudobyak 87'

17 February 2013 Friendly match	FC Tyumen (Russia)	2–1	Karpaty Lviv	Belek, Turkey
15:00	Andreev 49'; Garashchenkov 82' (o.g.)	Report	Ozarkiv 18'

20 February 2013 Friendly match	Tromsø (Norway)	1–0	Karpaty Lviv	Belek, Turkey
15:30	Johansen 30'	Report

24 February 2013 Friendly match	Karpaty Lviv	4–0	FC Ternopil	Lviv
14:00	Gladkiy 9', 42'; Zenjov 66'; Balažic 76'	Report		Stadium: Arena Lviv; Referee: Viktor Kravchenko

=== Premier League ===
==== League table ====
Pos	Team	Pld	W	D	L	GF	GA	GD	Pts
12	Vorskla Poltava	30	8	7	15	31	36	−5	31
13	Volyn Lutsk	30	7	8	15	26	45	−19	29
14	Karpaty Lviv	30	7	6	17	37	52	−15	27
15	Hoverla Uzhhorod	30	5	7	18	29	57	−28	22
16	Metalurh Zaporizhya	30	1	8	21	12	64	−52	11

Source: uafootball.net.ua
Rules for classification: 1st points; 2nd goal difference; 3rd goals scored; 4th head-to-head points; 5th head-to-head goal difference; 6th head-to-head goals scored; 7th fair play; 8th draw (Regulation, p.52-53).

==== Results summary ====
Overall								Home						Away					
Pld	W	D	L	GF	GA	GD	Pts	W	D	L	GF	GA	GD	W	D	L	GF	GA	GD
30	7	6	17	37	52	−15	27	6	3	6	24	19	+5	1	3	11	13	33	−20

==== Matches ====
13 July 2012 1	Volyn Lutsk	1–1	Karpaty Lviv	Lutsk
19:00 EEST	Ramon Lopes 69'	Report	Lucas 63'	Stadium: Avanhard Stadium; Attendance: 7,600; Referee: Dmytro Kutakov

20 July 2012 2	Karpaty Lviv	1–5	Illichivets Mariupol	Lviv
18:30	Ksyonz 40'	Report	Kravchenko 12', 15'; Fedotov 16', 59'; Butko 81'	Stadium: Ukraina Stadium; Attendance: 4,500; Referee: Yaroslav Kozyk

27 July 2012 3	Vorskla Poltava	3–1	Karpaty Lviv	Poltava
18:00	Lietava 21'; Bezus 27'; Yeremenko 53'	Report	Oshchypko 67'	Stadium: Butovsky Vorskla Stadium; Attendance: 4,000; Referee: Vitaliy Hodulyan

4 August 2012 4	Karpaty Lviv	2–0	Tavriya Simferopol	Lviv
18:30	Ksyonz 31'; Lucas 90+5'	Report		Stadium: Ukraina Stadium; Attendance: 5,000; Referee: Dmytro Zhukov

11 August 2012 5	Chornomorets Odesa	1–1	Karpaty Lviv	Odesa
20:30	Bakaj 3'	Report	Lucas 10'	Stadium: Chornomorets Stadium; Attendance: 19,248; Referee: Serhiy Dankovskyi

18 August 2012 6	Karpaty Lviv	2–1	Metalurh Zaporizhya	Lviv
16:30	Ksyonz 33'; Kasyan 52'	Report	Matyazh 67'	Stadium: Ukraina Stadium; Attendance: 10,300; Referee: Vitaliy Romanov

25 August 2012 7	Shakhtar Donetsk	3–0	Karpaty Lviv	Donetsk
18:00	Dentinho 31'; Luiz Adriano 39'; Mkhitaryan 41'	Report		Stadium: Donbas Arena; Attendance: 49,504; Referee: Yuriy Moseychuk

1 September 2012 8	Karpaty Lviv	0–1	Metalurh Donetsk	Lviv
16:30		Report	Junior Moraes 59'	Stadium: Ukraina Stadium; Attendance: 9,200; Referee: Serhiy Boyko

14 September 2012 9	Dynamo Kyiv	3–1	Karpaty Lviv	Kyiv
18:00	Ideye 34'; Kranjčar 57', 63'	Report	Lucas 73' (pen.)	Stadium: Olympic Stadium; Attendance: 27,604; Referee: Vitaliy Hodulyan

30 September 2012 10	Karpaty Lviv	1–1	Arsenal Kyiv	Lviv
19:30	Balažic 49'	Report	Adiyiah 28'	Stadium: Ukraina Stadium; Attendance: 11,100; Referee: Viktor Shvetsov

6 October 2012 11	Zorya Luhansk	2–1	Karpaty Lviv	Luhansk
13:30	Galyuza 56' (pen.); Khudzik 69'	Report	Oshchypko 59'	Stadium: Avanhard Stadium; Attendance: 7,000; Referee: Anatoliy Zhabchenko

21 October 2012 12	Karpaty Lviv	1–1	Hoverla Uzhhorod	Lviv
17:30	Hladkyi 55'	Report	Raičević 45'	Stadium: Ukraina Stadium; Attendance: 12,600; Referee: Oleksandr Derdo

28 October 2012 13	Dnipro Dnipropetrovsk	2–0	Karpaty Lviv	Dnipropetrovsk
15:30	Seleznyov 30' (pen.); Odibe 45+3'	Report		Stadium: Dnipro Arena; Attendance: 12,640; Referee: Yaroslav Kozyk

4 November 2012 14	Karpaty Lviv	6–0	Kryvbas Kryvyi Rih	Lviv
19:30	Kenia 6'; Hladkyi 23'; Lucas 29', 55', 89'; Štilić 40'	Report		Stadium: Ukraina Stadium; Attendance: 9,200; Referee: Yevhen Aranovskyi

11 November 2012 15	Metalist Kharkiv	2–1	Karpaty Lviv	Kharkiv
19:30	Cristaldo 40', 54'	Report	Kopolovets 69'	Stadium: Metalist Stadium; Attendance: 26,742; Referee: Viktor Shvetsov

18 November 2012 16	Karpaty Lviv	2–0	Volyn Lutsk	Lviv
17:30	Lucas 1'; Kenia 65'	Report		Stadium: Ukraina Stadium; Attendance: 12,400; Referee: Yuriy Moseychuk

25 November 2012 17	Illichivets Mariupol	2–0	Karpaty Lviv	Mariupol
13:30	Fomin 19'; Fedotov 90+2'	Report		Stadium: Illichivets Stadium; Attendance: 2,500; Referee: Vitaliy Hodulyan

1 December 2012 18	Karpaty Lviv	2–0	Vorskla Poltava	Lviv
17:30	Khudobyak 35'; Hladkyi 72'	Report		Stadium: Ukraina Stadium; Attendance: 9,200; Referee: Anatoliy Abdula

3 March 2013 19	Tavriya Simferopol	0–2	Karpaty Lviv	Simferopol
16:00		Report	Zenjov 9'; Hladkyi 42'	Stadium: Lokomotyv Stadium; Attendance: 4,500; Referee: Oleksandr Derdo

9 March 2013 20	Karpaty Lviv	1–2	Chornomorets Odesa	Lviv
17:30	Khudobyak 50'	Report	Burdujan 61'; Dja Djédjé 71'	Stadium: Ukraina Stadium; Attendance: 10,750; Referee: Anatoliy Abdula

15 March 2013 21	Metalurh Zaporizhya	1–1	Karpaty Lviv	Zaporizhia
19:00	Matheus 31'	Report	Kopolovets 10'	Stadium: Slavutych Arena; Attendance: 2,500; Referee: Kostyantyn Trukhanov

30 March 2013 22	Karpaty Lviv	1–2	Shakhtar Donetsk	Lviv
19:30	Zhovtyuk 43'	Report	Teixeira 32'; Rakitskiy 45+2'	Stadium: Ukraina Stadium; Attendance: 22,460; Referee: Yevhen Aranovskyi

7 April 2013 23	Metalurh Donetsk	4–0	Karpaty Lviv	Donetsk
13:30	Moraes 15', 54'; Leonardo 29'; Polyovyi 90'	Report		Stadium: Metalurh Stadium; Attendance: 2,800; Referee: Dmytro Kutakov

13 April 2013 24	Karpaty Lviv	0–1	Dynamo Kyiv	Lviv
17:30		Report	Ideye 64'	Stadium: Ukraina Stadium; Attendance: 25,850; Referee: Yaroslav Kozyk

22 April 2013 25	Arsenal Kyiv	4–1	Karpaty Lviv	Kyiv
18:00	Arzhanov 7' (pen.); Adiyiah 11'; Bohdanov 42'; Romanchuk 78'	Report	Kenia 77'	Stadium: Valeriy Lobanovskyi Dynamo Stadium; Attendance: 3,306; Referee: Anatoliy Abdula

28 April 2013 26	Karpaty Lviv	2–0	Zorya Luhansk	Lviv
17:30	Plastun 41'; Holodyuk 67'	Report		Stadium: Ukraina Stadium; Attendance: 6,700; Referee: Serhiy Dankovskyi

3 May 2013 27	Hoverla Uzhhorod	2–1	Karpaty Lviv	Uzhhorod
16:00	Le Tallec 49'; Trukhin 59'	Report	Hladkyi 39'	Stadium: Avanhard Stadium; Attendance: 5,600; Referee: Vitaliy Hodulyan

12 May 2013 28	Karpaty Lviv	2–4	Dnipro Dnipropetrovsk	Lviv
19:30	Douglas 79' (o.g.); Milošević 88'	Report	S.Kravchenko 15'; Seleznyov 18'; Kalinić 28'; Kobakhidze 90+2'	Stadium: Ukraina Stadium; Attendance: 0 Referee: Oleksandr Derdo

18 May 2013 29	Kryvbas Kryvyi Rih	3–2	Karpaty Lviv	Kryvyi Rih
18:30	Samodin 18', 77'; Lysytskyi 34'	Report	Zenjov 37', 68'	Stadium: Metalurh Stadium; Attendance: 3,340; Referee: Dmytro Kutakov

26 May 2013 30	Karpaty Lviv	1–1	Metalist Kharkiv	Lviv
18:00	Ozarkiv 90+4'	Report	Sosa 35'	Stadium: Ukraina Stadium; Attendance: 6,000; Referee: Serhiy Boyko

=== Ukrainian Cup ===
23 September 2012 Round of 32	Krymteplytsia Molodizhne	0–2	Karpaty Lviv	Simferopol
18:00		Report	Štilić 56'; Kopolovets 90+3'	Stadium: Sport KT Arena; Attendance: 1,500; Referee: Viktor Shvetsov

31 October 2012 Round of 16	Karpaty Lviv	2–1 aet	Metalist Kharkiv	Lviv
20:30	Štilić 77'; Kenia 107'	Report	Cristaldo 72'	Stadium: Ukraina Stadium; Attendance: 21,300; Referee: Yuriy Moseychuk

17 April 2013 Quarterfinal	Shakhtar Donetsk	2–1	Karpaty Lviv	Donetsk
19:00	Gai 32'; Teixeira 42'	Report	Zenjov 79' (pen.)	Stadium: Donbas Arena; Attendance: 29,312; Referee: Serhiy Berizka

== Squad information ==
=== Squad and statistics ===
==== Squad, appearances and goals ====
As of 26 May 2013

No.	Pos	Nat	Player	Total		Premier League		Ukrainian Cup	
No.	Pos	Nat	Player	Apps	Goals	Apps	Goals	Apps	Goals
1	GK	(North Macedonia) MKD	Martin Bogatinov	25	0	22	0	3	0
4	DF	(Serbia) SRB	Ivan Milošević	19	1	18	1	1	0
7	MF	(Ukraine) UKR	Pavlo Ksyonz	31	3	28	3	1+2	0
8	DF	(Ukraine) UKR	Ihor Oshchypko	17	2	15	2	2	0
10	FW	(Ukraine) UKR	Oleksandr Hladkyi	25	5	16+7	5	1+1	0
11	FW	(Estonia) EST	Sergei Zenjov	11	4	7+3	3	0+1	1
14	DF	(Ukraine) UKR	Serhiy Harashchenkov	5	0	1+3	0	0+1	0
16	MF	(Ukraine) UKR	Ihor Khudobyak (C)	32	2	26+3	2	3	0
17	MF	(Ukraine) UKR	Oleh Holodyuk	20	1	17+2	1	1	0
18	FW	(Ukraine) UKR	Mykhaylo Kopolovets	28	3	9+16	2	2+1	1
20	MF	(Georgia (country)) GEO	Levan Kenia	22	4	16+4	3	1+1	1
21	DF	(Slovenia) SLO	Gregor Balažic	19	1	17	1	2	0
22	MF	(Bosnia and Herzegovina) BIH	Semir Štilić	24	3	12+10	1	2	2
23	GK	(Ukraine) UKR	Roman Mysak	10	0	8+2	0	0	0
32	DF	(Ukraine) UKR	Ihor Plastun	28	1	24+1	1	3	0
33	DF	(Ukraine) UKR	Volodymyr Bidlovskyi	4	0	4	0	0	0
36	FW	(Ukraine) UKR	Volodymyr Hudyma	4	0	1+3	0	0	0
39	DF	(Ukraine) UKR	Mykola Zhovtyuk	8	1	3+4	1	1	0
41	DF	(Ukraine) UKR	Stepan Hirskyi	4	0	3+1	0	0	0
43	DF	(Ukraine) UKR	Ihor Ozarkiv	25	1	16+7	1	2	0
51	FW	(Ukraine) UKR	Serhiy Zahidulin	3	0	0+3	0	0	0
62	DF	(Ukraine) UKR	Taras Puchkovskyi	4	0	2+1	0	1	0
73	FW	(Ukraine) UKR	Taras Zaviyskyi	2	0	1+1	0	0	0
83	MF	(Ukraine) UKR	Oleh Bilyi	1	0	1	0	0	0
88	MF	(Georgia (country)) GEO	Murtaz Daushvili	25	0	21+1	0	3	0
97	FW	(Brazil) BRA	Marcelinho	12	0	4+7	0	1	0
Players away from the club on loan:
19	MF	(Ukraine) UKR	Yaroslav Martynyuk	5	0	2+2	0	0+1	0
25	MF	(Ukraine) UKR	Andriy Tkachuk	15	0	10+3	0	1+1	0
28	FW	(Ukraine) UKR	Oleksandr Kasyan	11	1	6+5	1	0	0
77	FW	(Spain) ESP	Lucas Pérez	18	8	17	8	1	0
Players featured for Karpaty but left before the end of the season:
3	MF	(Montenegro) MNE	Simon Vukčević	2	0	0+2	0	0	0
24	DF	(Poland) POL	Jakub Tosik	5	0	3+1	0	1	0

==== Goalscorers ====
As of 26 May 2013

Place	Position	Nation	Number	Name	Premier League	Ukrainian Cup	Total
1	FW	(Spain)	77	Lucas Pérez	8	0	8
2	FW	(Ukraine)	10	Oleksandr Hladkyi	5	0	5
3	MF	(Georgia (country))	20	Levan Kenia	3	1	4
3	FW	(Estonia)	11	Sergei Zenjov	3	1	4
5	MF	(Ukraine)	7	Pavlo Ksyonz	3	0	3
5	MF	(Bosnia and Herzegovina)	22	Semir Štilić	1	2	3
5	FW	(Ukraine)	18	Mykhaylo Kopolovets	2	1	3
8	DF	(Ukraine)	8	Ihor Oshchypko	2	0	2
8	MF	(Ukraine)	16	Ihor Khudobyak	2	0	2
10	FW	(Ukraine)	28	Oleksandr Kasyan	1	0	1
10	DF	(Slovenia)	21	Gregor Balažic	1	0	1
10	DF	(Ukraine)	39	Mykola Zhovtyuk	1	0	1
10	DF	(Ukraine)	32	Ihor Plastun	1	0	1
10	MF	(Ukraine)	17	Oleh Holodyuk	1	0	1
10	DF	(Serbia)	4	Ivan Milošević	1	0	1
10	DF	(Ukraine)	43	Ihor Ozarkiv	1	0	1
10				Own goal	1	0	1
				TOTALS	37	5	42

==== Disciplinary record ====
As of 26 May 2013

Number	Nation	Position	Name	Total		Premier League		Ukrainian Cup	
Number	Nation	Position	Name	Yellow card	Red card	Yellow card	Red card	Yellow card	Red card
1	(North Macedonia)	GK	Martin Bogatinov	3	1	3	1	0	0
4	(Serbia)	DF	Ivan Milošević	5	1	5	1	0	0
7	(Ukraine)	MF	Pavlo Ksyonz	5	0	4	0	1	0
8	(Ukraine)	DF	Ihor Oshchypko	4	0	3	0	1	0
10	(Ukraine)	FW	Oleksandr Hladkyi	2	0	1	0	1	0
11	(Estonia)	FW	Sergei Zenjov	1	0	1	0	0	0
14	(Ukraine)	DF	Serhiy Harashchenkov	4	0	3	0	1	0
16	(Ukraine)	MF	Ihor Khudobyak	7	0	6	0	1	0
18	(Ukraine)	FW	Mykhaylo Kopolovets	6	0	6	0	0	0
19	(Ukraine)	MF	Yaroslav Martynyuk	1	0	1	0	0	0
20	(Georgia (country))	MF	Levan Kenia	5	0	4	0	1	0
21	(Slovenia)	DF	Gregor Balažic	6	0	6	0	0	0
22	(Bosnia and Herzegovina)	MF	Semir Štilić	4	1	2	1	2	0
24	(Poland)	DF	Jakub Tosik	2	0	2	0	0	0
25	(Ukraine)	MF	Andriy Tkachuk	4	0	4	0	0	0
28	(Ukraine)	FW	Oleksandr Kasyan	1	1	1	1	0	0
32	(Ukraine)	DF	Ihor Plastun	5	0	5	0	0	0
39	(Ukraine)	DF	Mykola Zhovtyuk	2	1	2	1	0	0
41	(Ukraine)	DF	Stepan Hirskyi	1	0	1	0	0	0
43	(Ukraine)	MF	Ihor Ozarkiv	4	1	4	0	0	1
77	(Spain)	FW	Lucas Pérez	6	0	5	0	1	0
88	(Georgia (country))	MF	Murtaz Daushvili	8	3	8	3	0	0
97	(Brazil)	FW	Marcelinho	1	0	1	0	0	0
			TOTALS	87	9	78	8	9	1

=== Transfers ===
==== In ====
No.	Pos.	Nat.	Name	Age	Moving from	Type	Transfer Window	Contract ends	Transfer fee	Sources
10	FW	(Ukraine)	Oleksandr Hladkyi	24	Dnipro Dnipropetrovsk	Loan	Summer	—	—	
32	DF	(Ukraine)	Ihor Plastun	21	Obolon Kyiv	Transfer	Summer	—	—	
24	DF	(Poland)	Jakub Tosik	25	(Poland) Polonia Warsaw	Transfer	Summer	2015	Free	
22	MF	(Bosnia and Herzegovina)	Semir Štilić	24	(Poland) Lech Poznań	End of contract	Summer	2016	Free	
20	MF	(Georgia (country))	Levan Kenia	21	(Germany) Schalke 04	End of contract	Summer	2014	Free	
9	FW	(Cameroon)	Armand Ken Ella	19	(Spain) Barcelona Juvenil A	Transfer	Summer	2016	Free	
—	FW	(Spain)	Iago Beceiro	19	(Spain) Deportivo B	Transfer	—	—	—	
—	FW	(Ukraine)	Ilya Mikhalyov	22	PFC Oleksandriya	Loan return	Winter	—	—	
33	DF	(Ukraine)	Volodymyr Bidlovskyi	24	Krymteplytsia Molodizhne	Loan return	Winter	—	—	
—	MF	(Georgia (country))	Alexander Guruli	27	(Georgia (country)) Dila Gori	Loan return	Winter	—	—	
14	DF	(Ukraine)	Serhiy Garashchenkov	22	(Russia) Amkar Perm	Transfer	Winter	2017	—	
97	MF	(Brazil)	Marcelinho	22	(Brazil) Barueri	Transfer	Winter	—	—	
3	MF	(Montenegro)	Simon Vukčević	27	—	Free agent	Winter	2013	—	

==== Out ====
No.	Pos.	Nat	Name	Age	Moving to	Type	Transfer Window	Transfer fee	Sources
22	GK	(Ukraine)	Andriy Tlumak	33	—	End of contract	Summer	—	
15	DF	(Ukraine)	Taras Petrivskyi	28	(Russia) Volgar-Gazprom Astrakhan	End of contract	Summer	Free	
27	MF	(Brazil)	Eric Pereira	26	(Romania) Gaz Metan Medias	Transfer	Summer	Free	
20	DF	(Spain)	Borja Gómez	24	(Spain) Granada CF	Transfer	Summer	€800,000	
89	DF	(Brazil)	Danilo Avelar	23	(Italy) Cagliari	Loan	Summer	€300,000	
—	FW	(Ukraine)	Ilya Mikhalyov	22	PFC Oleksandriya	Loan	Summer	—	
—	DF	(Ukraine)	Volodymyr Bidlovskyi	24	Krymteplytsia Molodizhne	Loan	Summer	—	
10	MF	(Georgia (country))	Alexander Guruli	26	(Georgia (country)) Dila Gori	Loan	Summer	—	
9	MF	(Spain)	Cristóbal Márquez	28	(Spain) Elche CF	Loan	Summer	—	
24	DF	(Poland)	Jakub Tosik	25	(Poland) Polonia Warsaw	Released	—	Free	
—	MF	(Georgia (country))	Alexander Guruli	27	(Georgia (country)) Dinamo Batumi	Transfer	Winter	—	
—	FW	(Ukraine)	Ilya Mikhalyov	22	(Russia) FC Khimki	Loan	Winter	—	
28	FW	(Ukraine)	Oleksandr Kasyan	24	(Russia) Tom Tomsk	Loan	Winter	—	
25	MF	(Ukraine)	Andriy Tkachuk	25	Arsenal Kyiv	Loan	Winter	—	
19	MF	(Ukraine)	Yaroslav Martynyuk	24	Arsenal Kyiv	Loan	Winter	—	
77	FW	(Spain)	Lucas Pérez	24	Dynamo Kyiv	Loan	Winter	—	
3	MF	(Montenegro)	Simon Vukčević	27	—	Released	—	—	

=== Managerial changes ===
Outgoing head coach	Manner of departure	Date of vacancy	Table	Incoming head coach	Date of appointment
(Ukraine) Yuriy Dyachuk-Stavytskyi (interim)	End as interim	7 June	Pre-season	(Russia) Pavel Kucherov (interim)	7 June
(Russia) Pavel Kucherov (interim)	End as interim	29 July	12th	(Bulgaria) Nikolay Kostov	29 July
(Bulgaria) Nikolay Kostov	Resigned	4 May	13th	(Ukraine) Yuriy Dyachuk-Stavytskyi (interim)	7 May
