= 2013–14 FC Karpaty Lviv season =

Karpaty Lviv
2013–14 season
- Chairman: Petro Dyminsky
- Manager: Oleksandr Sevidov
- Stadium: Ukraina Stadium, Lviv
- Premier League: 11th
- Ukrainian Cup: Round of 16
- Top goalscorer: League: Oleksandr Hladkyi (10); All: Oleksandr Hladkyi (10)
- Highest home attendance: 18,800 vs Dynamo; 12 April 2014
- Lowest home attendance: 0^{[a]} vs Metalist; 11 May 2014

The 2013–14 FC Karpaty Lviv season was the 51st season in club history.

== Review and events ==
On 13 June 2013 FC Karpaty gathered at club's base for medical inspection after vacations. Due to financial difficulties, the club proposed that most of the players should re-sign their contracts with a decrease of salary, but 15 prominent players refused the proposal and were banished from the first team and left to train in Lviv. While the new head coach Oleksandr Sevidov took the remaining 16 players to pre-season training camp in Slovenia on 21 June 2013.

== Competitions ==
=== Friendly matches ===
==== Pre-season ====
23 June 2013 Friendly match	Domžale (Slovenia)	1–1	Karpaty Lviv	Radomlje, Slovenia
17:00 CEST (UTC+2)	Čovilo 62'	Report	Peričić 36' (o.g.)	Stadium: Sports Park; Attendance: 300; Referee: Žganec (Slovenia)

26 June 2013 Friendly match	Hajduk Split (Croatia)	2–1	Karpaty Lviv	Slovenske Konjice, Slovenia
18:00 CEST (UTC+2)	Kiš 30', 40'	Report	Bartulović 23'	Stadium: SD Dravinja Stadium; Attendance: 0 Referee: Iztok Gornjak (Slovenia)

1 July 2013 Friendly match	Kuban Krasnodar (Russia)	3–2	Karpaty Lviv	Wildon, Austria
17:00 CEST (UTC+2)	Baldé 34', 55'; Özbiliz 84'	Report	Ksyonz 32' (pen.), 48'	Referee: Franz Kreiner (Austria)

3 July 2013 Friendly match	Gorica (Slovenia)	0–2	Karpaty Lviv	Slovenske Konjice, Slovenia
18:00 CEST (UTC+2)		Report	Hladkyi 73', 85'	Stadium: SD Dravinja Stadium

6 July 2013 Friendly match	Lokomotiv Moscow U-19 (Russia)	2–3	Karpaty Lviv	Maribor, Slovenia
11:00 CEST (UTC+2)	Salamatov 37' (pen.); Koryan 52'	Report	Balažic 20'; Ksyonz 34' (pen.); Vasin 73'	Stadium: Limbuš-Pekre Stadium

==== Mid-season ====
7 September 2013 Friendly match	Karpaty Lviv	1–1	Nyva Ternopil	Lviv
18:00 EEST (UTC+3)	Vasin 5'	Report	Melnyk 67' (pen.)	Stadium: Ukraina Stadium; Referee: Andriy Hrysyo

12 October 2013 Friendly match	Karpaty Lviv	4–0	(Moldova) Zimbru Chișinău	Lviv
18:00 EEST (UTC+3)	Balažic 37'; Hladkyi 40'; Lyopa 55'; Bartulović 70'	Report		Stadium: Ukraina Stadium; Referee: Anatoliy Filevych

==== Winter break ====
23 January 2014 Friendly match	Shakhter Karagandy (Kazakhstan)	0–2	Karpaty Lviv	Belek, Turkey
17:30 EET (UTC+2)		Report	Bartulović 20'; Strashkevych 33'	Referee: Mageran Ramez (Azerbaijan)

27 January 2014 Friendly match	Split (Croatia)	0–1	Karpaty Lviv	Belek, Turkey
17:30 EET (UTC+2)		Report	Vasin 5'

30 January 2014 Friendly match	Arsenal Tula (Russia)	1–6	Karpaty Lviv	Belek, Turkey
15:00 EET (UTC+2)	Kutyin 17' (pen.)	Report	Hladkyi 18'; Lyopa 40'; Zenjov 45'; Zaviyskyi 56'; Bokhashvili 61'; Vasin 86'

1 February 2014 Friendly match	Ruch Chorzów (Poland)	0–2	Karpaty Lviv	Belek, Turkey
17:30 EET (UTC+2)		Report	Lyopa 42'; Zenjov 80'

3 February 2014 Friendly match	Turkmenistan	1–2	Karpaty Lviv	Belek, Turkey
11:30 EET (UTC+2)	Jumanazarow 88'	Report	Fedorchuk 60' (pen.); Hladkyi 84'	Referee: Paweł Raczkowski (Poland)

3 February 2014 Friendly match	Pohang Steelers (South Korea)	1–2	Karpaty Lviv	Kundu, Turkey
17:30 EET (UTC+2)	Park Sung-Ho 29'	Report	Bokhashvili 60'; Bartulović 68'

10 February 2014 Friendly match	Rad Belgrade (Serbia)	1–1	Karpaty Lviv	Antalya, Turkey
17:30 EET (UTC+2)	Raspopović 61'	Report	Fedorchuk 32'	Referee: ? (Russia)

12 February 2014 Friendly match	Trenčín (Slovakia)	2–2	Karpaty Lviv	Antalya, Turkey
17:30 EET (UTC+2)	Mišák 19' van Kessel 20'	Report	Bartulović 5'; Vasin 70' (pen.)	Referee: Nikolay Voloshyn (Russia)

15 February 2014 Friendly match	Kairat Almaty (Kazakhstan)	0–2	Karpaty Lviv	Antalya, Turkey
17:30 EET (UTC+2)		Report	Hladkyi 41'; Lyopa 90' (pen.)

19 February 2014 Friendly match	Shakhtyor Soligorsk (Belarus)	0–2	Karpaty Lviv	Side, Turkey
16:00 EET (UTC+2)		Report	Novotryasov 25'; Hladkyi 29'	Referee: Zaven Oganesyan (Armenia)

22 February 2014 Friendly match	Horizont Turnovo (North Macedonia)	0–2	Karpaty Lviv	Kundu, Turkey
17:30 EET (UTC+2)		Report	Strashkevych 40'; Bartulović 47'

1 March 2014 Friendly match	Karpaty Lviv	3–1	Bukovyna Chernivtsi	Bryukhovychi
16:00 EET (UTC+2)	Hladkyi 7'; Strashkevych 20'; Fedorchuk 70'	Report	Nemtinov 9'	Stadium: NTB Karpaty; Referee: Oleksandr Shandor

5 March 2014 Friendly match	Karpaty Lviv	5–0	Skala Stryi	Lviv
16:00 EET (UTC+2)	Plastun 18'; Bartulović 28' (pen.); Hladkyi 39'; Bokhashvili 52'; Hitchenko 61'	Report		Stadium: Ukraina Stadium; Referee: Andriy Hrysyo

8 March 2014 Friendly match	Karpaty Lviv	6–0	FC Ternopil	Bryukhovychi
15:00 EET (UTC+2)	Bartulović 9' (pen.); Zenjov 47', 73'; Lyopa 69'; Bokhashvili 87'; Serhiychuk 90'	Report		Stadium: NTB Karpaty; Referee: Yuriy Mozharovskyi

=== Premier League ===
==== League table ====
Pos	Team	Pld	W	D	L	GF	GA	GD	Pts	Qualification or relegation
9	Sevastopol (D)	28	10	5	13	32	43	−11	35	Club withdrew after season (Note: With the start of the Russo-Ukrainian war and annexation of Crimea by Russia, FC Sevastopol and SC Tavriya Simferopol were forced to withdraw. Later, new clubs were created in their place with similar names to participate in the Russian competitions next season.)
10	Illichivets Mariupol	28	10	4	14	27	33	−6	34	
11	Karpaty Lviv	28	7	11	10	33	39	−6	32	
12	Hoverla Uzhhorod	28	7	5	16	26	39	−13	26	
13	Volyn Lutsk	28	7	6	15	25	51	−26	24 (Note: On 20 May 2014, FC Volyn Lutsk were deducted three points by the FFU for breach of financial rules.)	

Source: uafootball.net.ua
Rules for classification: 1st points; 2nd goal difference; 3rd goals scored; 4th head-to-head points; 5th head-to-head goal difference; 6th head-to-head goals scored; 7th fair play rating
(D) Disqualified

==== Results summary ====
Overall								Home						Away					
Pld	W	D	L	GF	GA	GD	Pts	W	D	L	GF	GA	GD	W	D	L	GF	GA	GD
28	7	11	10	33	39	−6	32	4	5	5	17	22	−5	3	6	5	16	17	−1

==== Matches ====
14 July 2013 1	Karpaty Lviv	0–2	Vorskla Poltava	Lviv
17:30 EEST (UTC+3)		Report	Mishchenko 22'; Januzi 51'	Stadium: Ukraina Stadium; Attendance: 7,000; Referee: Serhiy Berezka

20 July 2013 2	Metalurh Donetsk	1–1	Karpaty Lviv	Donetsk
21:30 EEST (UTC+3)	Dimitrov 74'	Report	Hladkyi 66'	Stadium: Metalurh Stadium; Attendance: 1,500; Referee: Serhiy Boyko

27 July 2013 3	Karpaty Lviv	annulled	Arsenal Kyiv	Lviv
17:00 EEST (UTC+3)		Report	Shatskikh 53' (pen.); Adiyiah 60'	Stadium: Ukraina Stadium; Attendance: 8,000; Referee: Vitaliy Hodulyan

2 August 2013 4	Illichivets Mariupol	1–1	Karpaty Lviv	Mariupol
20:00 EEST (UTC+3)	Targamadze 83'	Report	Balažic 30'	Stadium: Illichivets Stadium; Attendance: 5,600; Referee: Serhiy Lysenchuk

10 August 2013 5	Karpaty Lviv	0–0	Zorya Luhansk	Lviv
19:00 EEST (UTC+3)		Report		Stadium: Ukraina Stadium; Attendance: 6,900; Referee: Anatoliy Zhabchenko

19 August 2013 6	Volyn Lutsk	1–1	Karpaty Lviv	Lutsk
19:00 EEST (UTC+3)	Šikov 56'	Report	Hladkyi 85'	Stadium: Avanhard Stadium; Attendance: 7,400; Referee: Dmytro Kutakov

25 August 2013 7	Karpaty Lviv	1–0	Hoverla Uzhhorod	Lviv
17:00 EEST (UTC+3)	Zenjov 57'	Report		Stadium: Ukraina Stadium; Attendance: 9,100; Referee: Serhiy Berezka

31 August 2013 8	FC Sevastopol	1–0	Karpaty Lviv	Sevastopol
21:30 EEST (UTC+3)	Farley 53'	Report		Stadium: Sevastopol Stadium; Attendance: 4,900; Referee: Vitaliy Hodulyan

13 September 2013 9	Karpaty Lviv	3–2	Shakhtar Donetsk	Lviv
19:00 EEST (UTC+3)	Hladkyi 8'; Bartulović 51' (pen.), 60'	Report	Douglas Costa 23'; Ismaily 71'	Stadium: Ukraina Stadium; Attendance: 10,300; Referee: Oleksandr Derdo

22 September 2013 10	Dynamo Kyiv	1–0	Karpaty Lviv	Kyiv
19:30 EEST (UTC+3)	Ideye 84'	Report		Stadium: Olympic Stadium; Attendance: 19,843; Referee: Yuriy Vaks

29 September 2013 11	Karpaty Lviv	2–1	Tavriya Simferopol	Lviv
17:00 EEST (UTC+3)	Zenjov 76' (pen.); Boussaïdi 78' (o.g.)	Report	Plastun 47' (o.g.)	Stadium: Ukraina Stadium; Attendance: 7,000; Referee: Anatoliy Abdula

5 October 2013 12	Metalurh Zaporizhya	1–3	Karpaty Lviv	Zaporizhya
16:00 EEST (UTC+3)	Shevchuk 90+5'	Report	Zenjov 46', 77'; Bartulović 54'	Stadium: Slavutych Arena; Attendance: 4,000; Referee: Serhiy Dankovskyi

19 October 2013 13	Karpaty Lviv	0–4	Dnipro Dnipropetrovsk	Lviv
17:00 EEST (UTC+3)		Report	Bruno Gama 16', 29'; Matheus 60'; Seleznyov 63'	Stadium: Ukraina Stadium; Attendance: 14,300; Referee: Oleksandr Derdo

26 October 2013 14	Metalist Kharkiv	2–1	Karpaty Lviv	Kharkiv
19:30 EEST (UTC+3)	Gómez 12'; Sosa 20'	Report	Bartulović 72'	Stadium: Metalist Stadium; Attendance: 26,844; Referee: Vitaliy Hodulyan

3 November 2013 15	Karpaty Lviv	1–1	Chornomorets Odesa	Lviv
19:30 EET (UTC+2)	Fedorchuk 24'	Report	Didenko 90+1'	Stadium: Ukraina Stadium; Attendance: 6,300; Referee: Anatoliy Zhabchenko

9 November 2013 16	Vorskla Poltava	2–2	Karpaty Lviv	Poltava
16:00 EET (UTC+2)	Chesnakov 13'; Dallku 41'	Report	Zenjov 5'; Kostevych 28'	Stadium: Butovskyi Vorskla Stadium; Attendance: 5,100; Referee: Serhiy Lysenchuk

23 November 2013 17	Karpaty Lviv	2–2	Metalurh Donetsk	Lviv
17:00 EET (UTC+2)	Hladkyi 2', 86'	Report	Moraes 23'; Bolbat 53'	Stadium: Ukraina Stadium; Attendance: 7,300; Referee: Dmytro Kutakov

30 November 2013 18	Arsenal Kyiv	cancelled	Karpaty Lviv	Kyiv
				Stadium: Valeriy Lobanovskyi Dynamo Stadium

15 March 2014 21	Karpaty Lviv	0–1	Volyn Lutsk	Lviv
17:00 EET (UTC+2)		Report	Kozban 76'	Stadium: Ukraina Stadium; Attendance: 5,700; Referee: Serhiy Berezka

23 March 2014 22	Hoverla Uzhhorod	1–0	Karpaty Lviv	Uzhhorod
17:00 EET (UTC+2)	Cociș 20'	Report		Stadium: Avanhard Stadium; Attendance: 6,800; Referee: Yuriy Vaks

29 March 2014 23	Karpaty Lviv	2–0	FC Sevastopol	Lviv
17:00 EET (UTC+2)	Bokhashvili 18'; Hladkyi 85'	Report		Stadium: Ukraina Stadium; Attendance: 7,800; Referee: Serhiy Lysenchuk

5 April 2014 24	Shakhtar Donetsk	3–0	Karpaty Lviv	Donetsk
17:00 EEST (UTC+3)	Eduardo 12', 43'; Luiz Adriano 51'	Report		Stadium: Donbas Arena; Attendance: 29,157; Referee: Kostyantyn Trukhanov

12 April 2014 25	Karpaty Lviv	2–2	Dynamo Kyiv	Lviv
17:00 EEST (UTC+3)	Fedorchuk 48'; Hladkyi 77'	Report	Veloso 33'; Mbokani 59'	Stadium: Ukraina Stadium; Attendance: 18,800; Referee: Anatoliy Zhabchenko

16 April 2014 19	Karpaty Lviv	0–1	Illichivets Mariupol	Lviv
18:00 EEST (UTC+3)		Report	Kulach 35'	Stadium: Ukraina Stadium; Attendance: 4,700; Referee: Serhiy Dankovskyi

20 April 2014 26	Tavriya Simferopol	0–1	Karpaty Lviv	Simferopol
14:00 EEST (UTC+3)		Report	Zenjov 49'	Stadium: Lokomotyv Stadium; Attendance: 1,100; Referee: Oleksandr Ivanov

23 April 2014 20	Zorya Luhansk	2–2	Karpaty Lviv	Luhansk
17:00 EEST (UTC+3)	Petryak 80'; Danilo 81'	Report	Hladkyi 28'; Bartulović 70' (pen.)	Stadium: Avanhard Stadium; Attendance: 7,000; Referee: Oleksandr Bilokur

27 April 2014 27	Karpaty Lviv	2–2	Metalurh Zaporizhya	Lviv
17:00 EEST (UTC+3)	Bartulović 43'; Zenjov 56'	Report	Yusov 49'; Hodin 87'	Stadium: Ukraina Stadium; Attendance: 6,400; Referee: Vitaliy Romanov

4 May 2014 28	Dnipro Dnipropetrovsk	1–4	Karpaty Lviv	Dnipropetrovsk
19:30 EEST (UTC+3)	Seleznyov 49'	Report	Zenjov 56' (pen.); Lyopa 63'; Hladkyi 84', 90+8'	Stadium: Dnipro Arena; Attendance: 15,592; Referee: Dmytro Kutakov

11 May 2014 29	Karpaty Lviv	2–4	Metalist Kharkiv	Lviv
19:30 EEST (UTC+3)	Bartulović 10' (pen.); Zenjov 23'	Report	Gómez 6'; Xavier 38' (pen.), 53' (pen.), 85'	Stadium: Ukraina Stadium; Attendance: 0^{[a]} Referee: Serhiy Boyko

18 May 2014 30	Chornomorets Odesa	0–0	Karpaty Lviv	Kyiv^{[b]}
17:00 EEST (UTC+3)		Report		Stadium: Obolon Arena; Attendance: 3,200; Referee: Yaroslav Kozyk

- ^{a} All matchday 29 games were held without spectators because of risk of terrorist attacks.
- ^{b} Originally to be played at Chornomorets Stadium, Odesa. Venue changed by Football Federation of Ukraine due to instability in south-eastern regions of Ukraine.

=== Ukrainian Cup ===
25 September 2013 Round of 32	Karpaty Lviv	1–0	FC Sevastopol	Lviv
21:00 EEST (UTC+3)	Ella 15'	Report		Stadium: Ukraina Stadium; Attendance: 14,200; Referee: Serhiy Lysenchuk

30 October 2013 Round of 16	Karpaty Lviv	0–2	Metalist Kharkiv	Lviv
20:00 EET (UTC+2)		Report	Gómez 22'; Moledo 43'	Stadium: Ukraina Stadium; Attendance: 18,500; Referee: Serhiy Boyko

== Squad information ==
=== Squad and statistics ===
==== Squad, appearances and goals ====
As of 18 May 2014

No.	Pos	Nat	Player	Total		Premier League		Ukrainian Cup	
No.	Pos	Nat	Player	Apps	Goals	Apps	Goals	Apps	Goals
1	GK	(Ukraine) UKR	Roman Pidkivka	14	0	14	0	0	0
2	MF	(Ukraine) UKR	Andriy Savchenko	1	0	1	0	0	0
5	DF	(Ukraine) UKR	Andriy Hitchenko	15	0	13+1	0	1	0
7	MF	(Ukraine) UKR	Valeriy Fedorchuk	26	2	25	2	1	0
8	DF	(Ukraine) UKR	Volodymyr Kostevych	23	1	20+1	1	2	0
9	FW	(Ukraine) UKR	Yuriy Habovda	4	0	0+4	0	0	0
10	FW	(Ukraine) UKR	Oleksandr Hladkyi	30	10	25+3	10	2	0
11	MF	(Croatia) CRO	Mladen Bartulović	24	7	21+2	7	1	0
17	MF	(Ukraine) UKR	Vadym Strashkevych	11	0	4+6	0	0+1	0
19	MF	(Ukraine) UKR	Yaroslav Martynyuk	19	0	8+10	0	0+1	0
20	FW	(Estonia) EST	Sergei Zenjov	30	9	20+8	9	1+1	0
21	DF	(Slovenia) SLO	Gregor Balažic	27	1	25	1	2	0
22	MF	(Ukraine) UKR	Dmytro Lyopa	14	1	9+4	1	1	0
24	DF	(Ukraine) UKR	Pavlo Pashayev	24	0	23	0	1	0
27	MF	(Ukraine) UKR	Oleh Holodyuk (C)	24	0	21+1	0	2	0
29	GK	(Ukraine) UKR	Oleksandr Ilyuschenkov	17	0	15	0	2	0
32	DF	(Ukraine) UKR	Ihor Plastun	23	0	21+1	0	1	0
36	FW	(Ukraine) UKR	Volodymyr Hudyma	1	0	0+1	0	0	0
39	FW	(Ukraine) UKR	Denys Vasin	17	0	6+10	0	0+1	0
62	DF	(Ukraine) UKR	Taras Puchkovskyi	2	0	0+2	0	0	0
77	FW	(Ukraine) UKR	Yevhen Bokhashvili	16	1	3+12	1	0+1	0
88	MF	(Georgia (country)) GEO	Murtaz Daushvili	9	0	9	0	0	0
92	MF	(Ukraine) UKR	Ambrosiy Chachua	11	0	10+1	0	0	0
94	DF	(Ukraine) UKR	Denys Miroshnichenko	10	0	6+3	0	1	0
Players away from the club on loan:
7	MF	(Ukraine) UKR	Pavlo Ksyonz	2	0	2	0	0	0
15	FW	(Cameroon) CMR	Armand Ken Ella	4	1	1+2	0	1	1
31	MF	(Ukraine) UKR	Ihor Tyschenko	6	0	5+1	0	0	0
43	MF	(Ukraine) UKR	Ihor Ozarkiv	1	0	0	0	1	0
97	FW	(Brazil) BRA	Marcelinho	4	0	1+2	0	0+1	0
Players featured for Karpaty but left before the end of the season:
25	MF	(Ukraine) UKR	Andriy Tkachuk	13	0	8+3	0	2	0
70	MF	(Nigeria) NGR	Samson Godwin	4	0	3+1	0	0	0

==== Goalscorers ====
As of 11 May 2014

Place	Position	Nation	Number	Name	Premier League	Ukrainian Cup	Total
1	FW	(Ukraine)	10	Oleksandr Hladkyi	10	0	10
2	FW	(Estonia)	20	Sergei Zenjov	9	0	9
3	MF	(Croatia)	11	Mladen Bartulović	7	0	7
4	MF	(Ukraine)	7	Valeriy Fedorchuk	2	0	2
5	DF	(Slovenia)	21	Gregor Balažic	1	0	1
5	FW	(Cameroon)	15	Armand Ken Ella	0	1	1
5	DF	(Ukraine)	8	Volodymyr Kostevych	1	0	1
5	FW	(Ukraine)	77	Yevhen Bokhashvili	1	0	1
5	MF	(Ukraine)	22	Dmytro Lyopa	1	0	1
5				Own goal	1	0	1
				TOTALS	33	1	34

==== Disciplinary record ====
As of 18 May 2014

Number	Nation	Position	Name	Total		Premier League		Ukrainian Cup	
Number	Nation	Position	Name	Yellow card	Red card	Yellow card	Red card	Yellow card	Red card
1	(Ukraine)	GK	Roman Pidkivka	1	0	1	0	0	0
5	(Ukraine)	DF	Andriy Hitchenko	4	0	3	0	1	0
7	(Ukraine)	MF	Valeriy Fedorchuk	8	1	7	1	1	0
8	(Ukraine)	FW	Volodymyr Kostevych	4	0	4	0	0	0
10	(Ukraine)	FW	Oleksandr Hladkyi	5	0	5	0	0	0
11	(Croatia)	MF	Mladen Bartulović	10	1	10	1	0	0
17	(Ukraine)	DF	Vadym Strashkevych	3	1	2	0	1	1
19	(Ukraine)	MF	Yaroslav Martynyuk	3	0	3	0	0	0
20	(Estonia)	FW	Sergei Zenjov	3	0	3	0	0	0
21	(Slovenia)	DF	Gregor Balažic	5	1	4	1	1	0
22	(Ukraine)	MF	Dmytro Lyopa	6	0	6	0	0	0
24	(Ukraine)	DF	Pavlo Pashayev	6	0	5	0	1	0
25	(Ukraine)	MF	Andriy Tkachuk	3	0	3	0	0	0
27	(Ukraine)	MF	Oleh Holodyuk	9	0	8	0	1	0
29	(Ukraine)	GK	Oleksandr Ilyuschenkov	1	0	1	0	0	0
31	(Ukraine)	MF	Ihor Tyschenko	2	0	2	0	0	0
32	(Ukraine)	DF	Ihor Plastun	5	0	5	0	0	0
39	(Ukraine)	FW	Denys Vasin	5	0	5	0	0	0
77	(Ukraine)	FW	Yevhen Bokhashvili	3	0	3	0	0	0
88	(Georgia (country))	MF	Murtaz Daushvili	2	0	2	0	0	0
92	(Ukraine)	MF	Ambrosiy Chachua	2	0	2	0	0	0
94	(Ukraine)	DF	Denys Miroshnichenko	4	0	4	0	0	0
97	(Brazil)	FW	Marcelinho	1	0	1	0	0	0
			TOTALS	95	4	89	3	6	1

=== Transfers ===
==== In ====
No.	Pos.	Nat.	Name	Age	Moving from	Type	Transfer Window	Contract ends	Transfer fee	Sources
25	MF	(Ukraine)	Andriy Tkachuk	25	Arsenal Kyiv	Loan return	Summer	—	—	
19	MF	(Ukraine)	Yaroslav Martynyuk	24	Arsenal Kyiv	Loan return	Summer	—	—	
—	GK	(Ukraine)	Vasyl Shpuk	24	Skala Stryi	End of contract	Summer	—	Free	
—	FW	(Ukraine)	Oleksandr Kasyan	24	(Russia) Tom Tomsk	Loan return	Summer	—	—	
—	FW	(Ukraine)	Ilya Mikhalyov	22	(Russia) FC Khimki	Loan return	Summer	—	—	
—	MF	(Spain)	Cristóbal Márquez	29	(Spain) Elche CF	Loan return	Summer	—	—	
—	FW	(Spain)	Lucas Pérez	24	Dynamo Kyiv	Loan return	Summer	—	—	
9	MF	(Ukraine)	Valeriy Fedorchuk	24	Dnipro Dnipropetrovsk	Loan	Summer	—	—	
11	MF	(Croatia)	Mladen Bartulović	26	Dnipro Dnipropetrovsk	Loan	Summer	—	—	
77	FW	(Ukraine)	Yevhen Bokhashvili	20	Dnipro Dnipropetrovsk	Loan	Summer	—	—	
24	DF	(Ukraine)	Pavlo Pashayev	25	Dnipro Dnipropetrovsk	Loan	Summer	—	—	
10	FW	(Ukraine)	Oleksandr Hladkyi	25	Dnipro Dnipropetrovsk	Loan	Summer	—	—	
5	DF	(Ukraine)	Andriy Hitchenko	28	Kryvbas Kryvyi Rih	End of contract	Summer	2016	Free	
94	MF	(Ukraine)	Denys Miroshnichenko	18	Kryvbas Kryvyi Rih	End of contract	Summer	2017	Free	
39	FW	(Ukraine)	Denys Vasin	24	Chornomorets Odesa	End of contract	Summer	2016	Free	
31	MF	(Ukraine)	Ihor Tyschenko	24	Illichivets Mariupol	End of contract	Summer	2016	Free	
22	MF	(Ukraine)	Dmytro Lyopa	24	Kryvbas Kryvyi Rih	End of contract	Summer	2014	Free	
70	MF	(Nigeria)	Samson Godwin	29	(Belarus) Slavia Mozyr	End of contract	Summer	2014	Free	
—	DF	(Ukraine)	Artur Novotryasov	21	Bukovyna Chernivtsi	End of contract	Winter	2018	Free	
30	FW	(Belarus)	Leonid Kovel	27	(Belarus) FC Minsk	—	Winter	2017	—	
34	FW	(Ukraine)	Mykhaylo Serhiychuk	22	MFC Mykolaiv	—	Winter	2018	—	
9	FW	(Ukraine)	Yuriy Habovda	24	Tavriya Simferopol	End of contract	Winter	2016	Free	

==== Out ====
No.	Pos.	Nat	Name	Age	Moving to	Type	Transfer Window	Transfer fee	Sources
10	FW	(Ukraine)	Oleksandr Hladkyi	25	Dnipro Dnipropetrovsk	End of loan	Summer	—	
—	DF	(Brazil)	Danilo Avelar	24	(Italy) Cagliari	Transfer	Summer	€1 Million	
16	MF	(Ukraine)	Ihor Khudobyak	28	(Russia) FC Rostov	Loan	Summer	—	
20	MF	(Georgia (country))	Levan Kenia	22	(Germany) Fortuna Düsseldorf	Transfer	Summer	€400,000	
18	MF	(Ukraine)	Mykhaylo Kopolovets	29	Hoverla Uzhhorod	Loan	Summer	—	
—	FW	(Spain)	Lucas Pérez	24	(Greece) PAOK	Loan	Summer	€700,000	
33	DF	(Ukraine)	Volodymyr Bidlovskyi	25	PFC Oleksandriya	Loan	Summer	—	
—	FW	(Ukraine)	Ilya Mikhalyov	22	(Russia) Luch-Energiya Vladivostok	Loan	Summer	—	
14	DF	(Ukraine)	Serhiy Harashchenkov	23	Illichivets Mariupol	Released	Summer	Free	
—	MF	(Spain)	Cristóbal Márquez	29	—	Released	Summer	—	
7	MF	(Ukraine)	Pavlo Ksyonz	26	Metalist Kharkiv	Loan	Summer	—	
—	FW	(Ukraine)	Oleksandr Kasyan	24	(Russia) Khimik Dzerzhinsk	Loan	Summer	—	
44	MF	(Bosnia and Herzegovina)	Semir Štilić	25	(Turkey) Gaziantepspor	Transfer	Summer	—	
41	DF	(Ukraine)	Stepan Hirskyi	22	Nyva Ternopil	Loan	Summer	—	
99	GK	(North Macedonia)	Martin Bogatinov	27	—	Released	—	—	
28	DF	(Ukraine)	Ihor Oshchypko	28	—	Released	Winter	—	
3	DF	(Serbia)	Ivan Milošević	29	—	Released	Winter	—	
25	MF	(Ukraine)	Andriy Tkachuk	26	—	Released	Winter	—	
70	MF	(Nigeria)	Samson Godwin	30	—	End of career	Winter	—	
15	FW	(Cameroon)	Armand Ken Ella	20	(Hungary) Rákóczi	Loan	Winter	—	
97	FW	(Brazil)	Marcelinho	23	(Brazil) Ituano	Loan	Winter	—	
43	MF	(Ukraine)	Ihor Ozarkiv	22	PFC Oleksandriya	Loan	Winter	—	
—	MF	(Ukraine)	Mykhaylo Kopolovets	30	(Belarus) Belshina Bobruisk	Loan	Winter	—	
—	FW	(Ukraine)	Ilya Mikhalyov	23	(Russia) Neftekhimik Nizhnekamsk	Loan	Winter	—	
4	DF	(Ukraine)	Mykola Zhovtyuk	21	Bukovyna Chernivtsi	Loan	Winter	—	
31	MF	(Ukraine)	Ihor Tyschenko	24	(Poland) Arka Gdynia	Loan	Winter	—	

=== Managerial changes ===
Outgoing head coach	Manner of departure	Date of vacancy	Table	Incoming head coach	Date of appointment
(Ukraine) Yuriy Dyachuk-Stavytskyi (interim)	End as interim	19 June	Pre-season	(Ukraine) Oleksandr Sevidov	19 June
