= Oleksandr Hladkyi =

Ukrainian footballer

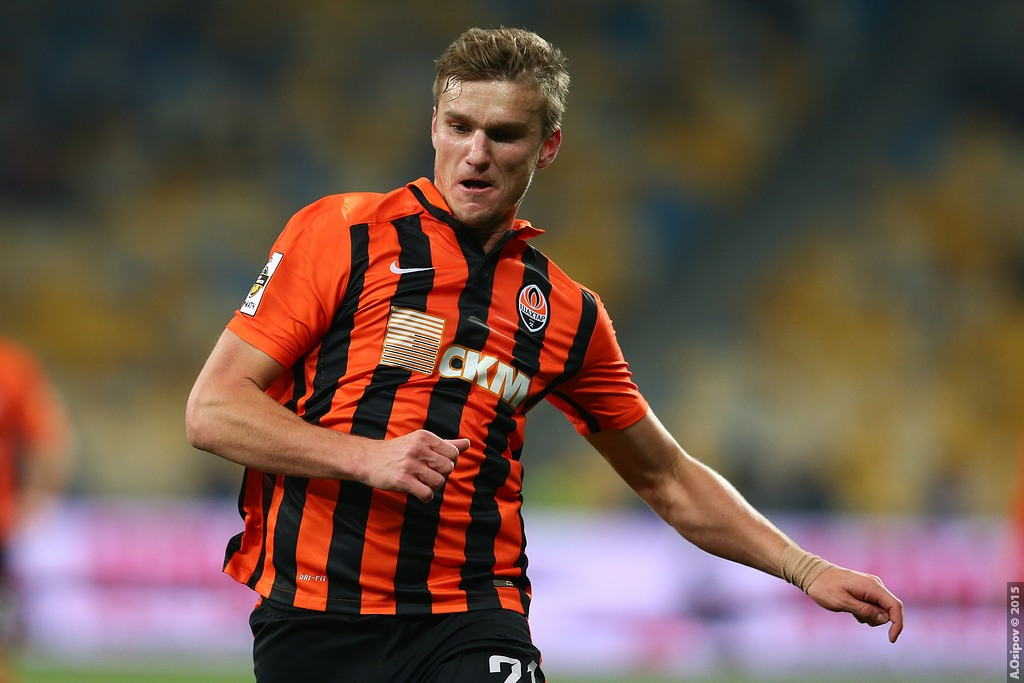

Personal information
- Full name: Oleksandr Mykolayovych Hladkyi
- Date of birth: 24 August 1987 (age 39)
- Place of birth: Lozova, Kharkiv Oblast, Ukrainian SSR
- Height: 1.88 m (6 ft 2 in)
- Position: Forward

Team information
- Current team: Avanhard Lozova

Youth career
- 2001–2003: Metalist Kharkiv

Senior career*
Years	Team	Apps	(Gls)
2003–2004	Metalist Kharkiv	17	(4)
2004	→ Metalist-2 Kharkiv	3	(2)
2005–2007	Kharkiv	64	(18)
2007–2010	Shakhtar Donetsk	82	(27)
2010–2014	Dnipro Dnipropetrovsk	23	(2)
2012–2014	→ Karpaty Lviv (loan)	59	(18)
2014–2016	Shakhtar Donetsk	36	(15)
2016–2017	Dynamo Kyiv	8	(0)
2017	→ Karpaty Lviv (loan)	13	(4)
2017	Karpaty Lviv	9	(1)
2018	Chornomorets Odesa	9	(2)
2018	Çaykur Rizespor	8	(0)
2019–2020	Adana Demirspor	24	(8)
2020–2022	Zorya Luhansk	38	(14)
2022–2023	Chornomorets Odesa	17	(1)
2024–	Avanhard Lozova		

International career^{‡}
2003–2004	Ukraine U17	17	(11)
2004–2005	Ukraine U19	15	(3)
2005	Ukraine U20	2	(0)
2004–2009	Ukraine U21	15	(5)
2007–2015	Ukraine	11	(1)
Medal record
Men's football
Representing Ukraine
UEFA European Under-19 Championship
Bronze medal – third place	2004 Switzerland
- * Club domestic league appearances and goals as of 11 May 2023 ‡ National team caps and goals as of 20 August 2022

Oleksandr Mykolayovych Hladkyi (Ukrainian: Олександр Миколайович Гладкий, born 24 August 1987) is a Ukrainian professional footballer who plays as a forward for an amateur side Avanhard Lozova. He has also appeared for the Ukraine national team. His last name is variously transliterated into English as Hladkyy.

== Club career ==
=== Kharkiv ===
Hladkyi began his career in Metalist Kharkiv's football academy, and soon after, the young player was invited to another professional club from the Kharkiv, FC Kharkiv. Under the direction of coach Volodymyr Bessonov, Hladkyi became a regular player for the club and soon established himself as one of the best strikers in the league. His first fame came in the 2006–07 season, when after scoring 13 goals to finish as the Ukrainian league's top scorer.

=== Shakhtar Donetsk ===
After this success, Hladkyi attracted the notice of giants Shakhtar Donetsk, and on 8 June 2007, he signed a five-year deal worth €2.5 million with the club.

On 7 May 2008, in the Ukrainian Cup final, during which he scored and also received a red card, Hladkyi earned the first trophy in his career when Shakhtar defeated rivals Dynamo Kyiv 2–0.

Hladkyi won the 2007–08 Ukrainian Premier League with Shakhtar, but fell one goal short of making Ukrainian Premier League history by being the top goalscorer for two consecutive years. However, with the addition of strikers Yevhen Seleznyov and Marcelo Moreno, and with coach Mircea Lucescu using only one forward in a 4-5-1 formation, Hladkyi had difficulty keeping his spot in the starting line-up or even a place on the bench, leaving his future in doubt. After 10 league games with only 1 win, Shakhtar coach Mircea Lucescu started Hladkyi, who scored in the 28th minute in a 3–0 win over Chornomorets Odesa. Mircea gave Hladkyi another starting opportunity due to an injury to Luiz Adriano, and he scored the third goal in Shakhtar's 4–2 win over FC Kryvbas Kryvyi Rih. Hladkyi scored a winner for Shakhtar against Olexandria in the 93rd minute in a Ukrainian Cup quarter-final, although he also injured his own side's second-choice goalkeeper Rustam Khudzhamov during a collision in the Shakhtar penalty area. He scored his first two UEFA Champions League goals in a historic 3–2 victory in Spain over F.C. Barcelona, ending the latter's streak of 20 games without defeat. As a result of the win, Shakhtar collected more points in the group stage than ever before (9).

Unable to gain a regular place at Shakhtar Donetsk, he transferred to Dnipro Dnipropetrovsk on 17 August 2010.

=== Shakhtar Donetsk return ===
In May 2014, Hladkyi departed for FC Shakhtar Donetsk, signing a two-year contract.

=== Dynamo Kyiv ===
Upon the expiration of his contract with Shakhtar Donetsk, Hladkyi signed a 3-year contract as a free agent with the Ukrainian champions, Dynamo Kyiv, on 23 May 2016.

=== Karpaty Lviv ===
On 2 March 2017 it was officially announced that Hladkyi is being loaned to Karpaty Lviv. It was his second stint in the club over his career. In July 2017 Dynamo has given Hladkyi a status of free agent and he signed a full-fledged contract with Karpaty. While playing for Karpaty in April 2017 he was recognized as a player of the month in the Ukrainian Premier League.

=== Turkish Super League ===
Before signing his first contract with foreign club in August 2018 and moving to Turkey, Hladkyi earlier in 2018 spent his time playing for Chornomorets Odesa that struggled to stay in the Ukrainian premiers.

== International career ==
Oleksandr Hladkyi was a regular member of the Ukraine national under-21 football team and scored 6 goals in 12 games. On 22 August 2007, he made his debut for the senior Ukraine national football team in a friendly against Uzbekistan and scored the opening goal, his only goal in 11 matches for Ukraine's senior squad. Since 2007, he has been called up to the main squad by Oleg Blokhin and then Oleksiy Mykhailychenko, but has not appeared for Ukraine since 2015.

== Career statistics ==
=== Club ===
As of 16 March 2019

Club	Season	League			National Cup		Europe		Other		Total	
Club	Season	Division	Apps	Goals	Apps	Goals	Apps	Goals	Apps	Goals	Apps	Goals
Metalist Kharkiv	2003–04	Ukrainian First League	8	3	0	0	–		–		8	3
Metalist Kharkiv	2004–05	Vyshcha Liha	9	1	2	0	–		–		11	1
Metalist Kharkiv	Total		17	4	2	0	–		–		19	4
Kharkiv	2004–05	Vyshcha Liha	10	4	0	0	–		–		10	4
Kharkiv	2005–06	Vyshcha Liha	25	1	2	1	–		–		27	2
Kharkiv	2006–07	Vyshcha Liha	29	13	1	0	–		–		30	13
Kharkiv	Total		64	18	3	1	–		–		67	19
Shakhtar Donetsk	2007–08	Vyshcha Liha	29	17	7	1	9	2	1 (Note: Appearance in Ukrainian Super Cup)	1	46	21
Shakhtar Donetsk	2008–09	Ukrainian Premier League	26	4	5	1	10	2	1	0	42	7
Shakhtar Donetsk	2009–10	Ukrainian Premier League	22	6	2	1	6	1	0	0	30	8
Shakhtar Donetsk	2010–11	Ukrainian Premier League	5	0	0	0	0	0	1	2	6	2
Shakhtar Donetsk	Total		82	27	14	3	25	5	3	3	124	38
Dnipro Dnipropetrovsk	2010–11	Ukrainian Premier League	19	2	4	2	2 (Note: Appearances in UEFA Europa League)	0	–		25	4
Dnipro Dnipropetrovsk	2011–12	Ukrainian Premier League	4	0	2	0	–		–		6	0
Dnipro Dnipropetrovsk	Total		23	2	6	2	2	0	–		31	4
Karpaty Lviv	2011–12	Ukrainian Premier League	8	3	2	1	–		–		10	4
Karpaty Lviv	2012–13	Ukrainian Premier League	23	5	3	0	–		–		26	5
Karpaty Lviv	2013–14	Ukrainian Premier League	28	10	2	0	–		–		30	10
Karpaty Lviv	Total		59	18	7	1	–		–		66	19
Shakhtar Donetsk	2014–15	Ukrainian Premier League	19	11	7	4	3 (Note: Appearances in UEFA Champions League)	0	1	1	30	16
Shakhtar Donetsk	2015–16	Ukrainian Premier League	17	4	3	2	10	3	1	0	31	9
Shakhtar Donetsk	Total		36	15	10	6	13	3	2	1	61	25
Dynamo Kyiv	2016–17	Ukrainian Premier League	8	0	0	0	3	0	0	0	11	0
Karpaty Lviv	2016–17	Ukrainian Premier League	13	4	0	0	–		–		13	4
Karpaty Lviv	2017–18	Ukrainian Premier League	9	1	1	0	–		–		10	1
Karpaty Lviv	Total		22	5	1	0	–		–		23	5
Chornomorets Odesa	2017–18	Ukrainian Premier League	9	2	0	0	–		–		9	2
Çaykur Rizespor	2018–19	Süper Lig	8	0	4	3	–		–		12	3
Adana Demirspor	2018–19	TFF First League	5	3	0	0	–		–		5	3
Career total			333	94	47	16	43	8	5	4	428	122

=== International ===
As of 16 March 2019

Ukraine
Year	Apps	Goals
2007	5	1
2008	3	0
2009	0	0
2010	0	0
2011	0	0
2012	0	0
2013	0	0
2014	1	0
2015	2	0
2016	0	0
2017	0	0
2018	0	0
Total	11	1

Scores and results list Ukraine's goal tally first.

No	Date	Venue	Opponent	Score	Result	Competition
1.	22 August 2007	Valeriy Lobanovskyi Dynamo Stadium, Kyiv, Ukraine	Uzbekistan	1–0	2–1	Friendly

== Honours ==
Shakhtar Donetsk

- Vyshcha Liha/Ukrainian Premier League: 2007–08, 2009–10
- Ukrainian Cup: 2007–08, 2015–16
- Ukrainian Super Cup: 2008, 2010, 2014, 2015
- UEFA Cup: 2008–09

Dynamo Kyiv

- Ukrainian Super Cup: 2016

Individual

- Vyshcha Liha Top Scorer: 2006–07 (13 goals)
- Vyshcha Liha Top Assist Provider: 2007–08 (11 assists)
- Ukrainian Premier League player of the Month: 2016–17 (April)

== See also ==
- 2005 FIFA World Youth Championship squads § Ukraine
