= Sergei Zenjov =

Estonian footballer (born 1989)

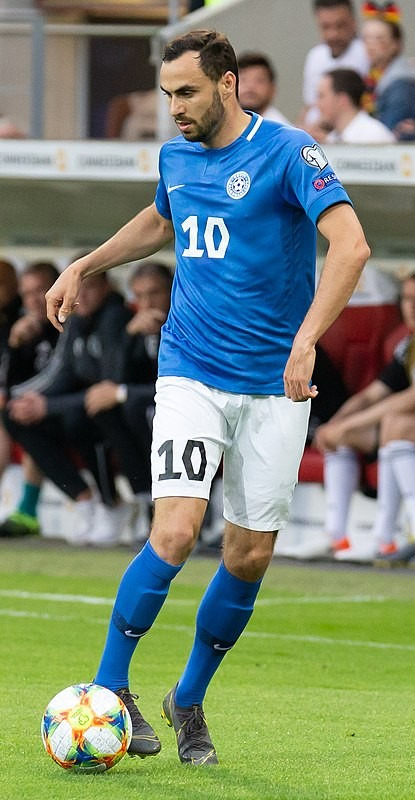
- Zenjov with Estonia in 2019 during UEFA Euro 2020 qualification

Personal information
- Full name: Sergei Zenjov
- Date of birth: 20 April 1989 (age 37)
- Place of birth: Pärnu, then part of Estonian SSR, Soviet Union
- Height: 1.83 m (6 ft 0 in)
- Position: Forward

Team information
- Current team: Flora
- Number: 20

Youth career
- Pärnu

Senior career*
Years	Team	Apps	(Gls)
2005	Pärnu Pataljon	19	(27)
2006	Vaprus	17	(8)
2006–2007	TVMK	34	(17)
2008–2014	Karpaty Lviv	137	(21)
2014	Blackpool	8	(0)
2015	Torpedo Moscow	10	(0)
2015–2017	Gabala	47	(8)
2017–2019	Cracovia	39	(4)
2019–2021	Shakhter Karagandy	47	(11)
2021–	Flora	170	(66)

International career
2005	Estonia U17	8	(2)
2006–2007	Estonia U19	6	(0)
2007–2010	Estonia U21	3	(1)
2008–2024	Estonia	114	(17)
- * Club domestic league appearances and goals as of 17 November 2026

Sergei Zenjov (born 20 April 1989) is an Estonian professional footballer who plays as a forward for Meistriliiga club Flora. Besides Estonia, Zenjov has played in England, Ukraine, Russia, Poland, Azerbaijan and Kazakhstan.

== Club career ==
=== Pärnu ===
Zenjov began playing football for a local club Pärnu, where he was coached by Juri Ivanov. He made his senior league debut in the II liiga with Pärnu Pataljon in 2005. Zenjov made his debut in the Meistriliiga on 8 March 2006, playing for Vaprus, and scored his side's only goal in a 1–3 away loss to TVMK.

=== TVMK ===
In July 2006, Zenjov signed for Meistriliiga club TVMK. He made his debut for the club on 23 July, in a 1–3 away loss to Levadia.

=== Karpaty Lviv ===
In February 2008, Zenjov signed a five-year contract with Vyshcha Liha club Karpaty Lviv. He made his debut in the Vyshcha Liha on 1 March 2008, in a 1–0 home victory over Kharkiv. On 27 July 2008, Zenjov scored his first goal for Karpaty Lviv in a 1–1 home draw against Shakhtar Donetsk.

Zenjov scored two goals in the qualification for the 2010–11 UEFA Europa League. He made his debut in the Europa League on 16 September 2010, in a 3–4 home loss to Borussia Dortmund.

=== Blackpool ===
On 3 July 2014, Zenjov signed a one-year contract with Championship club Blackpool. He made his debut for the club on 9 August, starting in a 0–2 away loss to Nottingham Forest. On 2 December 2014, Zenjov left Blackpool after a mutual agreement was reached to terminate his contract.

=== Torpedo Moscow ===
After leaving Blackpool, Zenjov signed a two-and-a-half-year contract with Russian Premier League club Torpedo Moscow on 12 January 2015. He made his debut in the Russian Premier League on 9 March 2015, in a 0–0 away draw against Amkar Perm.

=== Gabala ===
On 16 June 2015, Zenjov joined Azerbaijan Premier League club Gabala on a two-year contract. He made his debut for the club on 2 July 2015, in a 1–2 first leg defeat of their Europa League qualifier against Dinamo Tbilisi. On 19 March 2016, Zenjov scored Gabala's 500th goal in a 1–2 away loss to Qarabağ.

=== Cracovia ===
On 27 June 2017, Zenjov signed a one-year contract with Ekstraklasa club Cracovia. He made his debut in the Ekstraklasa on 15 July 2017, in Cracovia's first match of the 2017–18 season, and scored in the 1–1 home draw against Piast Gliwice.

== International ==
Zenjov began his youth career in 2005 with the Estonia under-17 team. He also represented the under-19 and under-21 national sides.

Zenjov made his senior international debut for Estonia on 20 August 2008, in a 2–1 home win over Malta in a friendly. He scored his first international goal in his second match for the national team on 6 September 2008, in a 2–3 away loss to Belgium in a qualification match for the 2010 FIFA World Cup.

On 23 September 2022, he played his 100th match for Estonia in the Nations League game against Malta.

== Career statistics ==
=== Club ===
As of 14 June 2024.

Appearances and goals by club, season and competition
Club	Season	League			Cup (Note: Includes the Estonian Cup, Ukrainian Cup, Azerbaijan Cup and Polish Cup)		League Cup		Europe		Other		Total	
Club	Season	Division	Apps	Goals	Apps	Goals	Apps	Goals	Apps	Goals	Apps	Goals	Apps	Goals
Pärnu Pataljon	2005	II liiga	19	27	—		—		—		—		19	27
Vaprus	2006	Meistriliiga	17	8	0	0	—		—		—		17	8
TVMK	2006	Meistriliiga	12	3	1	3	—		2 (Note: Appearances in UEFA Champions League)	0	2 (Note: Appearances in Baltic Champions Cup)	0	17	6
TVMK	2007	Meistriliiga	22	14	2	1	—		2 (Note: Appearances in UEFA Intertoto Cup)	0	2 (Note: Appearances in Baltic League)	0	28	15
TVMK	Total		34	17	3	4	—		4	0	4	0	45	21
Karpaty Lviv	2007–08	Vyshcha Liha	11	0	0	0	—		—		—		11	0
Karpaty Lviv	2008–09	Ukrainian Premier League	28	1	1	0	—		—		—		29	1
Karpaty Lviv	2009–10	Ukrainian Premier League	25	3	1	0	—		—		—		26	3
Karpaty Lviv	2010–11	Ukrainian Premier League	18	4	0	0	—		10 (Note: Appearances in UEFA Europa League)	2	—		28	6
Karpaty Lviv	2011–12	Ukrainian Premier League	17	1	2	0	—		3	1	—		22	2
Karpaty Lviv	2012–13	Ukrainian Premier League	10	3	2	2	—		—		—		12	5
Karpaty Lviv	2013–14	Ukrainian Premier League	28	9	2	0	—		—		—		30	9
Karpaty Lviv	Total		137	21	8	2	—		13	3	—		158	26
Blackpool	2014–15	Championship	8	0	0	0	1	0	—		—		9	0
Torpedo Moscow	2014–15	Russian Premier League	10	0	0	0	—		—		—		10	0
Gabala	2015–16	Azerbaijan Premier League	26	2	2	0	—		14	2	—		42	4
Gabala	2016–17	Azerbaijan Premier League	21	6	4	0	—		13	4	—		38	10
Gabala	Total		47	8	6	0	—		27	6	—		80	14
Cracovia	2017–18	Ekstraklasa	27	3	1	0	—		—		—		28	3
Cracovia	2018–19	Ekstraklasa	12	1	1	1	—		—		—		13	2
Cracovia	Total		39	4	2	1	—		—		—		41	5
Shakhter Karagandy	2019	Kazakhstan Premier League	30	8	—		—		—		—		30	8
Shakhter Karagandy	2020	Kazakhstan Premier League	17	3	—		—		—		—		17	3
Shakhter Karagandy	Total		47	11	—		—		—		—		47	11
Flora	2021	Meistriliiga	30	14	2	1	—		14 (Note: Four appearances and one goal in UEFA Champions League, two appearances in UEFA Europa League, eight appearances and two goals in UEFA Europa Conference League)	3	—		46	18
Flora	2022	Meistriliiga	30	10	2	0	—		2 (Note: Appearances in UEFA Europa Conference League)	0	1 (Note: Appearance in Estonian Supercup)	0	35	10
Flora	2023	Meistriliiga	29	12	3	2	—		2	0	1	0	35	14
Flora	2024	Meistriliiga	10	3	2	0	—		—		1	0	13	3
Flora	Total		99	39	9	3	—		18	3	3	0	129	45
Career total			457	135	28	10	1	0	62	12	7	0	555	157

=== International ===
Appearances and goals by national team and year
National team	Year	Apps	Goals
Estonia
Estonia	2008	3	1
Estonia	2009	8	2
Estonia	2010	4	1
Estonia	2011	6	1
Estonia	2012	0	0
Estonia	2013	11	2
Estonia	2014	8	0
Estonia	2015	8	2
Estonia	2016	6	1
Estonia	2017	10	3
Estonia	2018	10	0
Estonia	2019	10	0
Estonia	2020	3	0
Estonia	2021	6	1
Estonia	2022	9	2
Estonia	2023	10	1
Estonia	2024	2	0
Total		114	17

=== International goals ===
As of 10 January 2023. Estonia score listed first, score column indicates score after each Zenjov goal.

International goals by date, venue, cap, opponent, score, result and competition
No.	Date	Venue	Cap	Opponent	Score	Result	Competition
1	6 September 2008	Stade Maurice Dufrasne, Liège, Belgium	2	Belgium	1–1	2–3	2010 FIFA World Cup qualification
2	28 March 2009	Republican Stadium, Yerevan, Armenia	5	Armenia	2–1	2–2	2010 FIFA World Cup qualification
3	6 June 2009	A. Le Coq Arena, Tallinn, Estonia	7	Equatorial Guinea	3–0	3–0	Friendly
4	3 September 2010	A. Le Coq Arena, Tallinn, Estonia	12	Italy	1–0	1–2	UEFA Euro 2012 qualifying
5	6 September 2011	A. Le Coq Arena, Tallinn, Estonia	20	Northern Ireland	3–1	4–1	UEFA Euro 2012 qualifying
6	15 November 2013	A. Le Coq Arena, Tallinn, Estonia	31	Azerbaijan	1–1	2–1	Friendly
7	19 November 2013	Rheinpark Stadion, Vaduz, Liechtenstein	32	Liechtenstein	1–0	3–0	Friendly
8	14 June 2015	A. Le Coq Arena, Tallinn, Estonia	44	San Marino	1–0	2–0	UEFA Euro 2016 qualifying
9	14 June 2015	A. Le Coq Arena, Tallinn, Estonia	44	San Marino	2–0	2–0	UEFA Euro 2016 qualifying
10	31 August 2016	Pärnu Rannastaadion, Pärnu, Estonia	51	Malta	1–0	1–1	Friendly
11	28 March 2017	A. Le Coq Arena, Tallinn, Estonia	56	Croatia	3–0	3–0	Friendly
12	12 June 2017	Skonto Stadium, Riga, Latvia	58	Latvia	1–1	2–1	Friendly
13	7 October 2017	Estádio Algarve, Faro/Loulé, Portugal	61	Gibraltar	3–0	6–0	2018 FIFA World Cup qualification
14	8 October 2021	A. Le Coq Arena, Tallinn, Estonia	90	Belarus	2–0	2–0	2022 FIFA World Cup qualification
15	16 November 2022	Daugava Stadium, Riga, Latvia	101	Latvia	1–0	1–1	2022 Baltic Cup
16	19 November 2022	A. Le Coq Arena, Tallinn, Estonia	102	Lithuania	1–0	2–0	2022 Baltic Cup
17	8 January 2023	Estadio da Nora, Albufeira, Portugal	103	Iceland	1–0	1–1	Friendly

== Honours ==
Flora

- Meistriliiga: 2022, 2023
- Estonian Supercup: 2024

Individual

- Estonian Young Footballer of the Year: 2008, 2010
- Meistriliiga Player of the Month: May 2023, October 2024,
