= Oleh Bilyi =

Ukrainian association football player

Personal information
- Full name: Oleh Yuriyovych Bilyi
- Date of birth: 29 May 1993 (age 33)
- Place of birth: Ukraine
- Height: 1.73 m (5 ft 8 in)
- Position: Midfielder

Team information
- Current team: FC Skala Stryi
- Number: 16

Youth career
- 2006–2010: FC Karpaty Lviv

Senior career*
Years	Team	Apps	(Gls)
2010–2014	FC Karpaty Lviv	1	(0)
2014–2015	FC Naftovyk-Ukrnafta Okhtyrka	15	(1)
2015–2016	FC Hoverla Uzhhorod	0	(0)
2016–	FC Skala Stryi	2	(0)

International career^{‡}
2008	Ukraine-16	2	(0)
- * Club domestic league appearances and goals as of 13 September 2016 ‡ National team caps and goals as of 13 September 2016

Oleh Bilyi (Ukrainian: Олег Юрійович Білий; born 29 May 1993 in Ukraine) is a professional Ukrainian football midfielder who currently plays for club FC Skala Stryi in Ukrainian First League.

Bilyi is the product of the Karpaty Lviv Youth School System. He made his debut for FC Karpaty playing full-time against FC Arsenal Kyiv on 30 September 2012 in Ukrainian Premier League.

He also played for Ukrainian national football teams in the youth age representation.
