= Iago Beceiro =

Spanish footballer (born 1993)

Personal information
- Full name: Iago Beceiro Pereiro
- Date of birth: 15 March 1993 (age 33)
- Place of birth: A Coruña, Spain
- Height: 1.86 m (6 ft 1 in)
- Position: Forward

Team information
- Current team: Tropezón

Youth career
- 2009–2010: Deportivo La Coruña

Senior career*
Years	Team	Apps	(Gls)
2010–2012	Deportivo B	28	(5)
2011	Deportivo La Coruña	0	(0)
2013	Karpaty Lviv	0	(0)
2013	Verín	7	(3)
2013–2014	Deportivo B	9	(5)
2014	Caudal	8	(0)
2014	Somozas	0	(0)
2014–2016	Verín	40	(24)
2016	Ponferradina	0	(0)
2016	→ Atlético Astorga (loan)	14	(3)
2016–2017	Navalcarnero	10	(0)
2017	Barco	16	(2)
2017–2018	Arosa	16	(1)
2018–2019	Ourense	23	(5)
2019–	Tropezón	15	(6)

International career
2009	Spain U17	2	(0)
- * Club domestic league appearances and goals as of 21:26, 16 January 2020 (UTC)

Iago Beceiro Pereiro (born 15 March 1993) is a Spanish footballer who plays for CD Tropezón as a forward.

His career, which he started at Deportivo de La Coruña, was marred by indiscipline problems.

== Football career ==
=== Deportivo ===
Beceiro was born in A Coruña, Galicia. After playing for local Deportivo de La Coruña as a youth he started his senior career, going on to compete with the reserves in Segunda División B and Tercera División.

Beceiro made his first-team debut on 19 January 2011, coming on as a second-half substitute for Pablo Álvarez in a 2–3 home loss against UD Almería for the season's Copa del Rey. He spent the remaining of his spell at the club with the B's, however.

=== Karpaty Lviv ===
In late January 2013, Beceiro signed a contract with Ukrainian Premier League team FC Karpaty Lviv. He left the after only a few weeks, without making a single appearance.

=== Back to Spain ===
In April 2013, Beceiro moved back to his home country and joined Verín CF in the regional leagues. After scoring regularly, he returned to Deportivo and its reserve team in July, but terminated his contract on 29 January 2014.

Beceiro subsequently had unassuming spells at Caudal Deportivo and UD Somozas, before returning to Verín in late 2014. On 20 January 2016 he signed for Segunda División side SD Ponferradina, being immediately loaned to Atlético Astorga FC until the end of the third level campaign.

On 3 August 2016, Beceiro was loaned to CDA Navalcarnero for one year. The following January, his loan was terminated and he moved to CD Barco in the fourth tier, also in a temporary deal.

In July 2017, Beceiro signed with Arosa SC still in his native region and the lower leagues. His contract was ended in January of the following year, due to indiscipline.
