= Serhiy Zahidulin =

Ukrainian footballer (born 1992)

Personal information
- Full name: Serhiy Volodymyrovych Zahidulin
- Date of birth: 26 March 1992 (age 34)
- Place of birth: Zhytomyr, Ukraine
- Height: 1.73 m (5 ft 8 in)
- Position: Defender

Youth career
- 2005–2007: Polissya Zhytomyr
- 2007–2009: UFK Lviv

Senior career*
Years	Team	Apps	(Gls)
2008–2014	Karpaty Lviv	3	(0)
2008–2010	→ Karpaty-2 Lviv	17	(0)
2014–2015	Bukovyna Chernivtsi	20	(1)
2015	Veres Rivne	1	(0)
2016	Sambir (amateurs)	?	(?)
2017	Ternopil	1	(0)
2017	Polissya Zhytomyr	10	(0)
- * Club domestic league appearances and goals as of 24 November 2017

Serhiy Zahidulin (Ukrainian: Сергій Володимирович Загідулін; born 26 March 1992 in Zhytomyr, in Ukraine) is a professional Ukrainian football defender.

== Career ==
He played for club FC Karpaty Lviv in Ukrainian Premier League.

Zahidulin is the product of the FC Polissya Zhytomyr and UFK Lviv School Systems. He made his debut for FC Karpaty entering as a second-half substitute against FC Dnipro Dnipropetrovsk on 28 October 2012 in Ukrainian Premier League.
