= Jakub Tosik =

Polish footballer (born 1987)

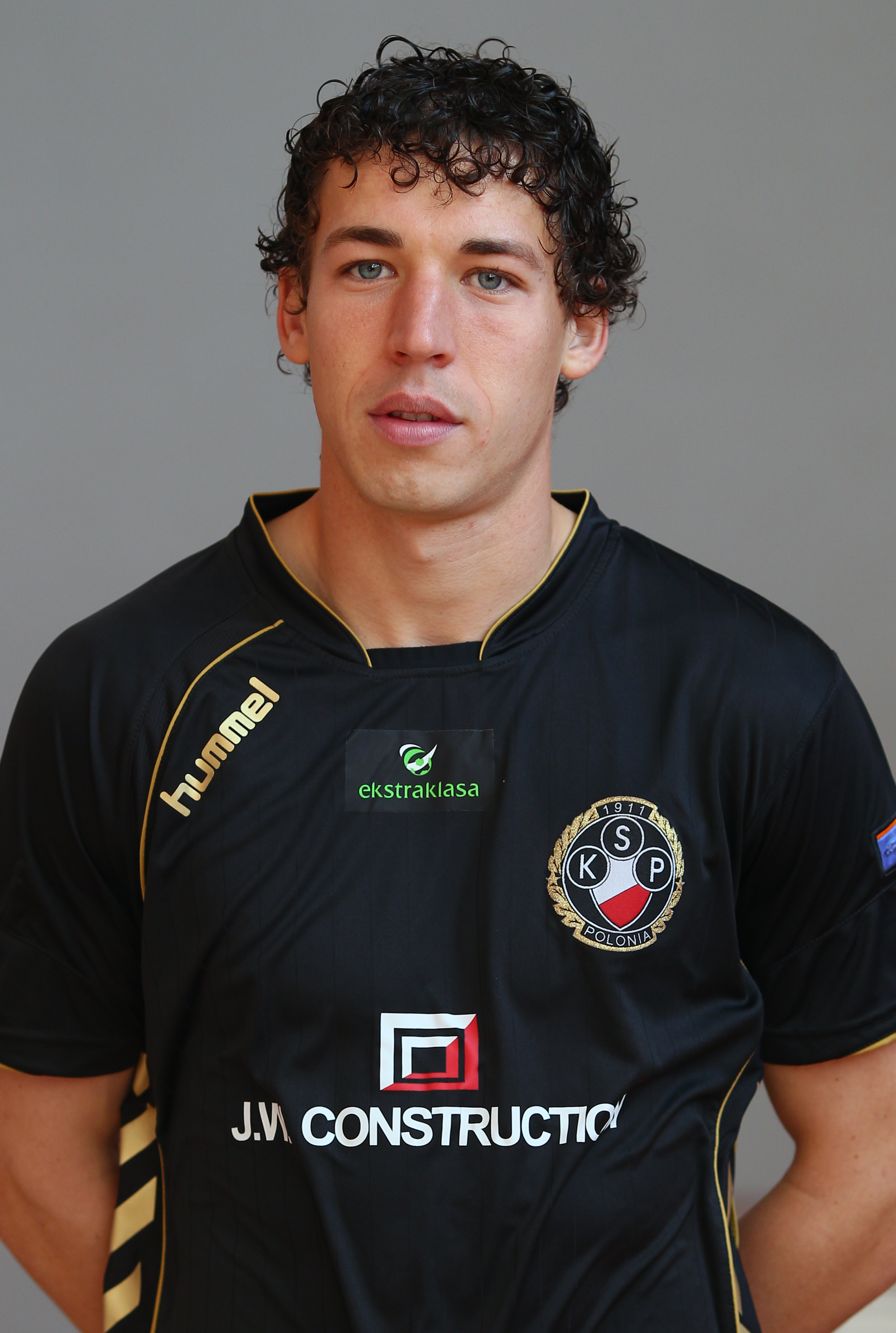
- Tosik with Polonia Warsaw in 2011

Personal information
- Full name: Jakub Tosik
- Date of birth: 21 May 1987 (age 39)
- Place of birth: Zelów, Poland
- Height: 1.82 m (6 ft 0 in)
- Position: Midfielder

Team information
- Current team: Legia Warsaw II (assistant)

Youth career
- Włókniarz Zelów

Senior career*
Years	Team	Apps	(Gls)
2004–2010	GKS Bełchatów	35	(3)
2010–2012	Polonia Warsaw	35	(0)
2012–2013	Karpaty Lviv	4	(0)
2013	Polonia Warsaw	12	(0)
2013–2014	Jagiellonia Białystok	30	(0)
2014–2020	Zagłębie Lubin	151	(11)
2020–2022	ŁKS Łódź	42	(0)
2022–2023	ŁKS Łódź II	19	(1)
2023–2024	Lubienianka Lubień Kujawski	22	(5)
2024–	Włókniarz Zelów	45	(10)
Total		395	(30)

International career
2010	Poland	2	(0)

Managerial career
- 2025–2026: Włókniarz Zelów (player-manager)
- * Club domestic league appearances and goals

Jakub Tosik (born 21 May 1987) is a Polish professional football manager and former player who played as a defensive midfielder or a defender. He is currently the assistant manager of II liga club Legia Warsaw II.

== Club career ==
Tosik joined Polonia Warsaw after leaving GKS Bełchatów at the end of the 2009–10 season. On 13 July 2012, he signed a three-year contract with Ukrainian side FC Karpaty Lviv, after only a year Polonia Warsaw signed him back.

On 21 July 2020 he signed a two-year contract with ŁKS Łódź. On 4 August 2022, he penned a new two-year deal and was moved to the reserves team.

On 9 August 2023, he joined his former ŁKS teammate Maciej Dąbrowski at sixth tier side Lubienianka Lubień Kujawski.

== International career ==
Tosik was part of the Poland under-19 team that participated in the 2006 UEFA European Under-19 Championship held in Poland. He made his debut for the Poland senior team on 17 January 2010, in a 1–3 friendly loss to Denmark.

== Coaching career ==
In August 2024, Tosik joined his hometown club Włókniarz Zelów, in the regional league, as a playing assistant. On 17 March 2025, he was appointed player-manager.

In July 2026, Tosik left Włókniarz to join Legia Warsaw II's coaching staff as an assistant under Marcin Matysiak.

== Managerial statistics ==
As of match played 13 June 2026

Managerial record by team and tenure
Team	From	To	Record							
Team	From	To	G	W	D	L	GF	GA	GD	Win %
Włókniarz Zelów (player-manager)	17 March 2025	6 July 2026	47	21	7	19	101	94	+7	44.68
Total			47	21	7	19	101	94	+7	44.68

== Honours ==
Zagłębie Lubin

- I liga: 2014–15

ŁKS Łódź II

- III liga, group I: 2022–23
