= Dmytro Lyopa =

Ukrainian football midfielder (born 1988)

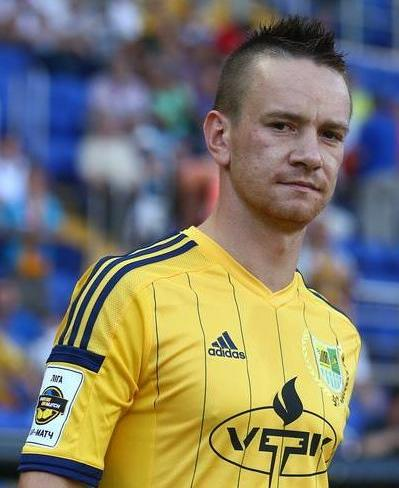
- Lyopa in 2015

Personal information
- Full name: Dmytro Serhiyovych Lopa
- Date of birth: 23 November 1988 (age 37)
- Place of birth: Kremenchuk, Ukrainian SSR, Soviet Union
- Height: 1.72 m (5 ft 8 in)
- Position: Attacking midfielder

Team information
- Current team: Mladost Ždralovi
- Number: 10

Youth career
- 2001–2004: Kremin Kremenchuk

Senior career*
Years	Team	Apps	(Gls)
2005–2012	Dnipro Dnipropetrovsk	44	(4)
2009–2010	→ Kryvbas Kryvyi Rih (loan)	12	(0)
2012	→ Kryvbas Kryvyi Rih (loan)	15	(1)
2013	Kryvbas Kryvyi Rih	4	(0)
2013–2014	Karpaty Lviv	13	(1)
2014–2015	Metalurh Zaporizhzhia	15	(1)
2015	Metalist Kharkiv	12	(0)
2016–2017	Puskás Akadémia	6	(0)
2016–2017	→ Osijek (loan)	21	(8)
2017–2021	Osijek	85	(7)
2021–2022	VPK-Ahro Shevchenkivka	13	(1)
2023–	Mladost Ždralovi	51	(11)

International career^{‡}
2003	Ukraine U15	4	(1)
2003–2004	Ukraine U16	17	(4)
2004–2005	Ukraine U17	17	(3)
2005–2006	Ukraine U18	5	(1)
2006–2007	Ukraine U19	10	(0)
2007–2008	Ukraine U21	10	(2)
- * Club domestic league appearances and goals as of 30 October 2024 ‡ National team caps and goals as of 7 February 2017

Dmytro Serhiyovych Lyopa (Ukrainian: Дмитро Сергійович Льопа; born 23 November 1988) is a Ukrainian professional footballer who plays as an attacking midfielder plays for Mladost Ždralovi.

== Career ==
In February 2023, he moved to Mladost Ždralovi.

== Honours ==
Puskás Akadémia

- Nemzeti Bajnokság II: 2016–17
