= Pavlo Ksyonz =

Ukrainian footballer

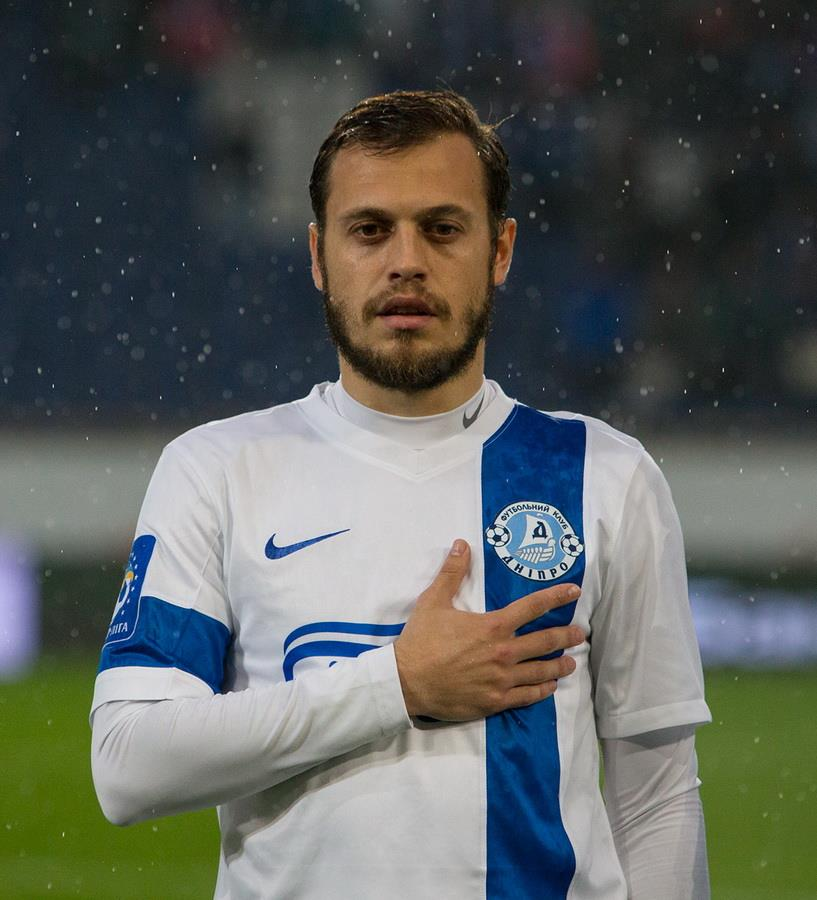
- Ksyonz with Dnipro Dnipropetrovsk in 2015

Personal information
- Full name: Pavlo Serhiyovych Ksyonz
- Date of birth: 2 January 1987 (age 39)
- Place of birth: Myrhorod, Soviet Union (now Ukraine)
- Height: 1.76 m (5 ft 9 in)
- Positions: Full-back; winger

Team information
- Current team: Mazur Karczew
- Number: 10

Senior career*
Years	Team	Apps	(Gls)
2003–2010	Dynamo Kyiv	0	(0)
2004–2005	→ Dynamo-3 Kyiv	16	(6)
2004–2006	→ Dynamo-2 Kyiv	49	(6)
2007	→ CSKA Kyiv (loan)	11	(0)
2007–2008	→ Zakarpattia Uzhhorod (loan)	22	(1)
2008	→ Illichivets Mariupol (loan)	6	(0)
2009	→ Kharkiv (loan)	12	(0)
2009	→ Zakarpattia Uzhhorod (loan)	7	(1)
2010	→ Oleksandriya (loan)	34	(7)
2010–2012	Oleksandriya	32	(1)
2012–2017	Karpaty Lviv	96	(6)
2013–2014	→ Metalist Kharkiv (loan)	24	(0)
2015	→ Dnipro Dnipropetrovsk (loan)	12	(1)
2018	Sandecja Nowy Sącz	11	(0)
2018–2020	Olimpik Donetsk	61	(0)
2021	VPK-Ahro Shevchenkivka	14	(2)
2021–2022	Livyi Bereh Kyiv	15	(2)
2022–2024	Mazovia Mińsk Mazowiecki	60	(8)
2024–	Mazur Karczew	68	(16)

International career
2003	Ukraine U16	7	(3)
2004–2005	Ukraine U18	15	(7)
2005	Ukraine U19	11	(1)
2015	Ukraine	1	(0)
- * Club domestic league appearances and goals as of 10:39, 5 July 2026 (UTC)

Pavlo Serhiyovych Ksyonz (Ukrainian: Павло Сергійович Ксьонз; born 2 January 1987) is a Ukrainian professional footballer who plays as a full-back or winger for Polish IV liga Masovia club Mazur Karczew.

== Career statistics ==
=== International ===
Appearances and goals by national team and year
National team	Year	Apps	Goals
Ukraine
Ukraine	2015	1	0
Total		1	0

== Honours ==
Dnipro Dnipropetrovsk

- UEFA Europa League runner-up: 2014–15

Mazovia Mińsk Mazowiecki

- Polish Cup (Siedlce regionals): 2023–24

Mazur Karczew

- V liga Masovia II: 2024–25
