= Oleksandr Kasyan =

Ukrainian footballer (1989–2026)

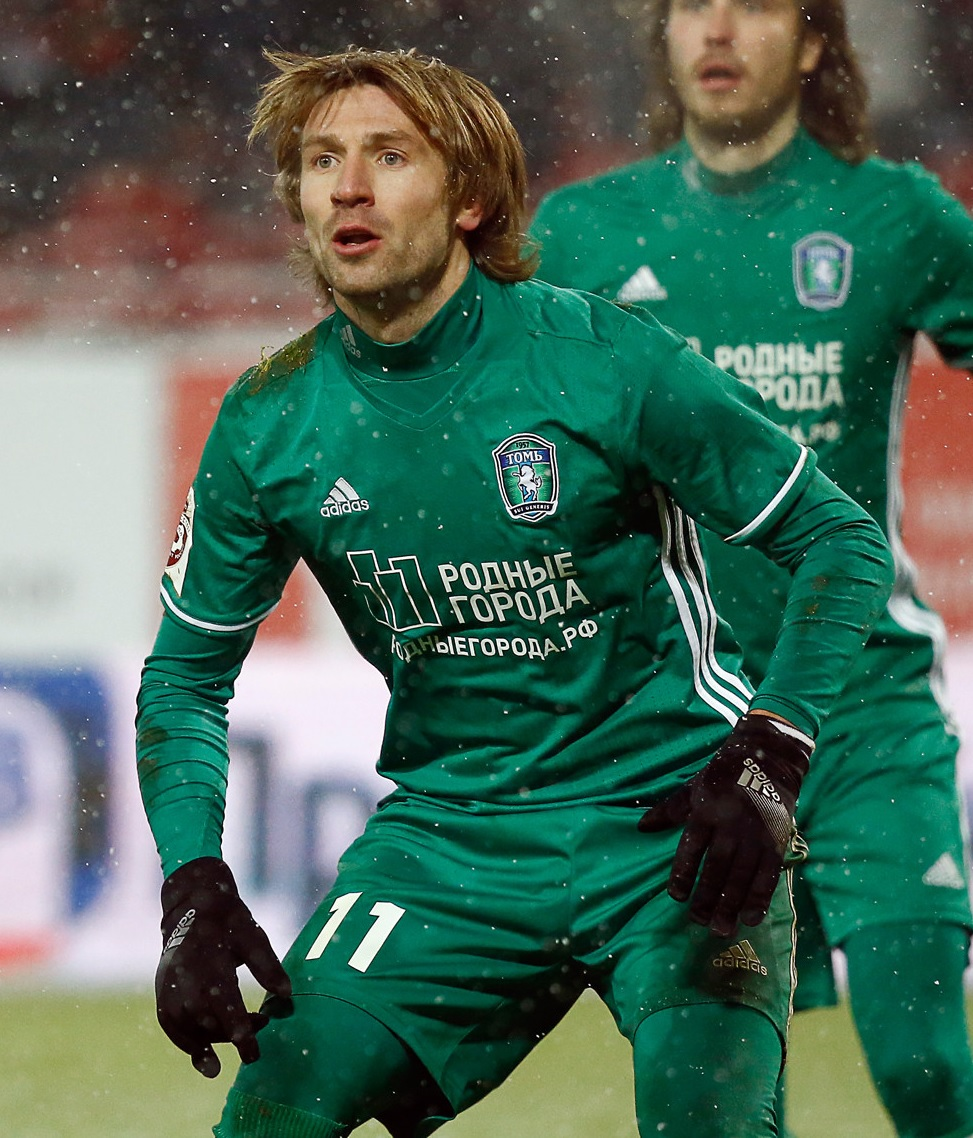
- Kasyan with Tom Tomsk in 2016

Personal information
- Full name: Oleksandr Yurіyovich Kasyan
- Date of birth: 27 January 1989
- Place of birth: Bezimenne, Donetsk Oblast, Ukrainian SSR, USSR
- Date of death: 30 August 2026 (aged 37)
- Height: 1.85 m (6 ft 1 in)
- Position: Forward

Youth career
- 2001–2005: FC Illichivets Mariupol
- 2005–2006: FC Shakhtar Donetsk

Senior career*
Years	Team	Apps	(Gls)
2006–2012	Shakhtar Donetsk	0	(0)
2006–2008	→ Shakhtar-3 Donetsk	34	(12)
2009–2010	→ Illichivets Mariupol (loan)	26	(5)
2010–2011	→ Zorya Luhansk (loan)	21	(2)
2011	→ Illichivets Mariupol (loan)	3	(0)
2012–2014	Karpaty Lviv	19	(5)
2013	→ Tom Tomsk (loan)	10	(2)
2013–2014	→ Khimik Dzerzhinsk (loan)	23	(6)
2014–2015	Khimik Dzerzhinsk	19	(5)
2015–2016	Fakel Voronezh	30	(7)
2016	Tom Tomsk	12	(0)
2017	Fakel Voronezh	12	(4)
2017–2018	Baltika Kaliningrad	31	(5)
2018	Avangard Kursk	14	(2)
2019	Navbahor Namangan	24	(10)
2020	Surkhon Termez	25	(8)
2021–2022	AGMK	34	(6)
2022	Navbahor Namangan	6	(0)
2023	Bukhara	13	(0)

International career
2005	Ukraine U17	1	(0)
2009	Ukraine U21	2	(1)
- * Club domestic league appearances and goals

Oleksandr Yurіyovich Kasyan (Ukrainian: Олександр Юрійович Кас'ян; Russian: Александр Юрьевич Касьян; 27 January 1989 – 30 August 2026) was a Ukrainian professional footballer who played as a forward.

== Career ==
Kasyan began his career in the youth team of Shakhtar Donetsk, and was called up to the Ukraine under-21 national team in 2009. In Ukraine he played for Illichivets Mariupol, Zorya Luhansk, and Karpaty Lviv.

From 2013 Kasyan played for various Russian teams, including Tom Tomsk, Avangard Kursk, and Khimik Dzerzhinsk. In 2019 he joined the Uzbek club Navbahor Namangan. He retired in 2023.

== Personal life ==
Kasyan received Russian citizenship in 2015. He died from a cardiac arrest on 30 August 2026, at the age of 37.
