= Volodymyr Bidlovskyi =

Ukrainian footballer

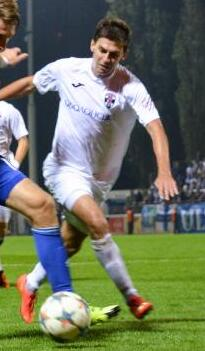
- Bidlovskyi playing for Obolon-Brovar Kyiv in 2015

Personal information
- Full name: Volodymyr Zinoviyovych Bidlovskyi
- Date of birth: 31 May 1988 (age 38)
- Place of birth: Ternopil, Ukrainian SSR
- Height: 1.74 m (5 ft 9 in)
- Position: Midfielder

Youth career
- 2001–2002: Sportive School Ternopil
- 2002–2003: FC Obolon-Zmina Kyiv
- 2004: Sportive School Ternopil
- 2005: UFK Lviv

Senior career*
Years	Team	Apps	(Gls)
2005–2014	FC Karpaty Lviv	10	(0)
2005–2008	→ FC Karpaty-2 Lviv	42	(3)
2010	→ PFC Oleksandria (loan)	14	(0)
2011–2012	→ FC Krymteplytsia Molodizhne (loan)	50	(3)
2013–2014	→ PFC Oleksandria (loan)	16	(2)
2014–2015	PFC Oleksandria	14	(0)
2015–2016	FC Obolon-Brovar Kyiv	21	(0)
2016–2018	FC Rukh Vynnyky	25	(10)
2018–2020	FC Vorkuta		

International career
2006	Ukraine-18	6	(0)
2006–2007	Ukraine-19	8	(0)
2008–2009	Ukraine-21	8	(0)
- * Club domestic league appearances and goals as of 7 December 2018

Volodymyr Bidlovskyi (Ukrainian: Володимир Зіновійович Бідловський; born 31 May 1988 in Ukrainian SSR) is a professional Ukrainian football midfielder who plays as a midfielder.

== Career ==
After graduating from the Ternopil Youth School System he joined the professional ranks by signing with FC Karpaty Lviv in the Ukrainian First League. After Karpaty secured promotion in 2006 he played in several matches in the Ukrainian Premier League. Throughout his tenure with Lviv he featured in the Ukrainian Second League with FC Karpaty-2 Lviv, and was loaned to PFC Oleksandria, and FC Krymteplytsia Molodizhne. In 2014, he permanently signed with PFC Oleksandria, and secured promotion to the Ukrainian Premier League. The following season he returned to the Ukrainian First League to play with FC Obolon-Brovar Kyiv.

After a season in Kyiv he played in the Ukrainian Second League with FC Rukh Vynnyky, and assisted in securing promotion to the Ukrainian First League in 2016–2017. In 2018, he played abroad in the Canadian Soccer League with FC Vorkuta., where he assisted in securing the CSL Championship.

== Honors ==
FC Vorkuta

- CSL Championship: 2018
- Canadian Soccer League First Division: 2019
