= Gregor Balažic =

Slovenian footballer

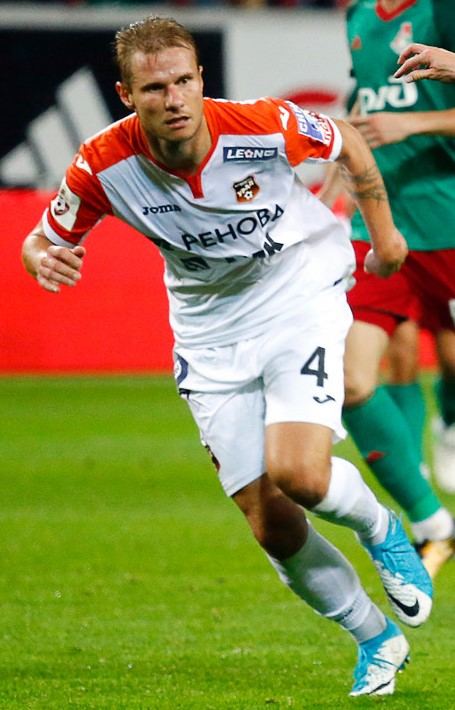
- Balažic with Ural in 2017

Personal information
- Full name: Gregor Balažic
- Date of birth: 12 February 1988 (age 38)
- Place of birth: Murska Sobota, SFR Yugoslavia
- Height: 1.90 m (6 ft 3 in)
- Position: Centre-back

Youth career
- –2005: Mura
- 2005–2007: Benfica

Senior career*
Years	Team	Apps	(Gls)
2005	Mura	1	(0)
2007	Espanyol B	0	(0)
2007	Águilas	2	(0)
2008–2010	Gorica	72	(2)
2011–2014	Karpaty Lviv	79	(7)
2015–2016	Partizan	38	(1)
2017–2019	Ural Yekaterinburg	48	(2)
2020–2021	Enosis Neon	44	(1)
2022–2023	Mura	34	(2)
Total		318	(15)

International career
2004	Slovenia U17	3	(0)
2006	Slovenia U19	3	(0)
2007–2010	Slovenia U20	6	(0)
2007–2010	Slovenia U21	19	(0)
2013–2014	Slovenia	2	(0)
- * Club domestic league appearances and goals

Gregor Balažic (born 12 February 1988) is a retired Slovenian professional footballer who played as a central defender.

In Slovenia, he played for Mura and Gorica. He had spells abroad in Spain, Ukraine, Serbia, Russia and Cyprus, notably having a four-year spell with Karpaty Lviv in the Ukrainian Premier League and winning the 2014–15 Serbian SuperLiga with Partizan.

Balažic represented Slovenia at all youth levels, and made his senior debut in 2013.

== Club career ==
=== Early career ===
Born in Murska Sobota, Balažic came through the youth academy of Mura, who went defunct in 2005. He made his first-team debut at the age of 17 in a 2–1 home league win against Zagorje on 30 April 2005, during the club's last competitive season.

In the summer of 2005, Balažic was transferred to Benfica of Portugal. Until his departure two years later, he played exclusively for their youth sides.

=== Spain ===
In June 2007, Balažic moved to Spain and signed with Espanyol, being initially registered for the reserves. However, two months later, he left for Águilas also in the country's Segunda División B.

Balažic suffered a knee injury early into the campaign, which resulted in the termination of his contract in December 2007.

=== Gorica ===
In the winter transfer window of 2008, Balažic returned to his country and signed for Gorica of the Slovenian PrvaLiga. He scored his first goal as a senior on 5 December 2009, helping to a 1–1 home draw against Olimpija Ljubljana.

Balažic contributed with 29 games in 2009–10, helping his team to finish third and qualify for the UEFA Europa League.

=== Karpaty Lviv ===
In January 2011, Balažic signed with Karpaty Lviv in the Ukrainian Premier League, penning a four-year deal for €400,000 in what was the club's most expensive transfer ever. On 6 March he made his competitive debut, netting in a 2–2 draw at Arsenal Kyiv.

In the first round of 2014–15, Balažic scored in a 2–2 away draw to Hoverla Uzhhorod. He scored a career-best four goals during that season, in only 13 matches.

=== Partizan ===
On 4 February 2015, Balažic signed a two-year contract with Partizan. On 28 February he made his first appearance, featuring the full 90 minutes in a 0–0 home draw against Radnički Niš.

On 25 April 2015, during the Eternal derby against Red Star Belgrade, Balažic was fouled in the area by Vukašin Jovanović in what should have been a penalty for Partizan, but referee Milorad Mažić did not concede it. A week later, against Vojvodina, this time it was Balažic who brought down an opponent but, again, nothing was awarded; later, he admitted he did commit the infraction.

During his debut campaign, Balažic partnered his compatriot Branko Ilić as a central defender. After the departure of the latter in the summer, he started alongside Brazilian Fabrício. He scored his first official goal for the team on 22 August 2015, helping to a 3–1 away victory over Borac Čačak.

=== Ural ===
On 30 December 2016, Balažic signed for two and a half years with Russian Premier League club Ural Yekaterinburg. On 7 June 2019, he left upon the expiration of his contract.

== International career ==
Balažic made his senior debut for Slovenia on 19 November 2013, in a 1–0 friendly win against Canada in Celje. His second cap came on 7 June of the following year in another friendly, a 2–0 loss to Argentina in La Plata.

== Style of play ==
Balažic is a quick and strong player, technically gifted and with passing ability. Oleg Kononov, his coach at Karpaty, described him as a "very intelligent player" with a "great potential".

== Career statistics ==
=== Club ===
As of 1 January 2022

Appearances and goals by club, season and competition
Club	Season	League			National cup		Continental		Total	
Club	Season	Division	Apps	Goals	Apps	Goals	Apps	Goals	Apps	Goals
Mura	2004–05	Slovenian PrvaLiga	1	0	0	0	—		1	0
Águilas	2007–08	Segunda División B	2	0	0	0	—		2	0
Gorica	2007–08	Slovenian PrvaLiga	9	0	0	0	—		9	0
Gorica	2008–09	Slovenian PrvaLiga	18	0	3	0	2	0	23	0
Gorica	2009–10	Slovenian PrvaLiga	29	1	3	0	2	0	34	1
Gorica	2010–11	Slovenian PrvaLiga	16	1	3	0	2	0	21	1
Gorica	Total		72	2	9	0	6	0	87	2
Karpaty Lviv	2010–11	Ukrainian Premier League	5	1	—		—		5	1
Karpaty Lviv	2011–12	Ukrainian Premier League	19	0	4	0	2	0	25	0
Karpaty Lviv	2012–13	Ukrainian Premier League	17	1	2	0	—		19	1
Karpaty Lviv	2013–14	Ukrainian Premier League	25	1	2	0	—		27	1
Karpaty Lviv	2014–15	Ukrainian Premier League	13	4	2	0	—		15	4
Karpaty Lviv	Total		79	7	10	0	2	0	91	7
Partizan	2014–15	Serbian SuperLiga	13	0	3	0	—		16	0
Partizan	2015–16	Serbian SuperLiga	10	1	1	0	9	0	20	1
Partizan	2016–17	Serbian SuperLiga	15	0	0	0	0	0	15	0
Partizan	Total		38	1	4	0	9	0	51	1
Ural	2016–17	Russian Premier League	11	0	3	0	—		14	0
Ural	2017–18	Russian Premier League	20	2	0	0	—		20	2
Ural	2018–19	Russian Premier League	17	0	0	0	—		17	0
Ural	Total		48	2	3	0	0	0	51	2
Enosis Neon	2019–20	Cypriot First Division	8	0	1	0	—		9	0
Enosis Neon	2020–21	Cypriot First Division	36	1	1	0	—		37	1
Enosis Neon	Total		44	1	2	0	0	0	46	1
Career total			284	13	28	0	17	0	329	13

=== International ===
Appearances and goals by national team and year
National team	Year	Apps	Goals
Slovenia	2013	1	0
Slovenia	2014	1	0
Total		2	0

== Honours ==
Partizan

- Serbian SuperLiga: 2014–15
- Serbian Cup: 2015–16
