= Stepan Hirskyi =

Ukrainian footballer

Personal information
- Full name: Stepan Bohdanovych Hirskyi
- Date of birth: 8 January 1991 (age 35)
- Place of birth: Lviv, Ukrainian SSR
- Height: 1.78 m (5 ft 10 in)
- Position: Defender

Team information
- Current team: FK Olesko

Youth career
- 2004–2008: Karpaty Lviv

Senior career*
Years	Team	Apps	(Gls)
2008	Karpaty-2 Lviv	17	(1)
2008–2014	Karpaty Lviv	14	(0)
2013–2014	→ Nyva Ternopil (loan)	10	(0)
2014	Poltava	3	(0)
2015	Chrobry Głogów	7	(2)
2016–2017	GKS Tychy	25	(3)
2017–2018	Stal Stalowa Wola	27	(1)
2018–2020	SKK Demnya		
2020–2021	Yunist Giyche		
2021–2022	Kulykiv		
2022–2024	Mykolaiv		
2024–	FK Olesko		

International career
2007	Ukraine U16	11	(0)
2007–2008	Ukraine U17	9	(1)
2008–2009	Ukraine U18	3	(0)
2010	Ukraine U19	1	(0)
- * Club domestic league appearances and goals as of 6 January 2025

Stepan Hirskyi (Ukrainian: Степан Богданович Гірський; born 8 January 1991) is a Ukrainian professional footballer who plays as a defender for FK Olesko.

Hirskyi is the product of the Karpaty Lviv Youth School System. He made his debut for Karpaty entering as a second-half substitute against Metalurh Donetsk on 15 May 2011 in Ukrainian Premier League.

He also played for Ukrainian national football teams in different age representations.
