= Mykola Zhovtyuk =

Ukrainian footballer

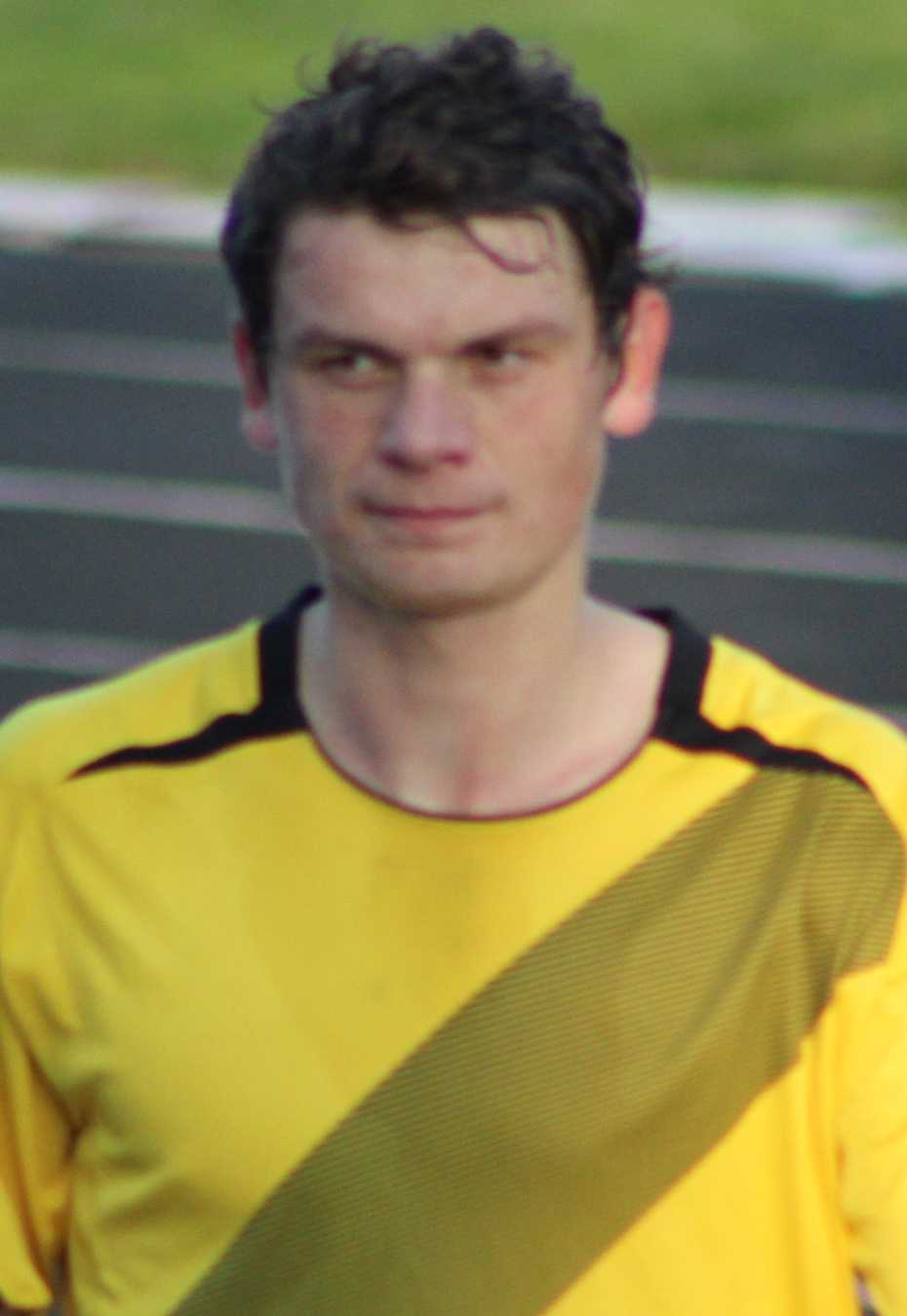

Personal information
- Full name: Mykola Volodymyrovych Zhovtyuk
- Date of birth: 21 May 1992 (age 34)
- Place of birth: Novohrad-Volynskyi, Ukraine
- Height: 1.84 m (6 ft 1/2 in)
- Position: Defender

Team information
- Current team: MKS Gogolin

Youth career
- 2005–2009: UFK Lviv

Senior career*
Years	Team	Apps	(Gls)
2009–2015	Karpaty Lviv	6	(0)
2009–2010	→ Karpaty-2 Lviv	7	(1)
2014–2015	→ Bukovyna Chernivtsi	27	(1)
2015	Veres Rivne	14	(1)
2016–2017	Bukovyna Chernivtsi	17	(2)
2017–2018	Polissya Zhytomyr	17	(2)
2018–2022	Krystal Kherson	66	(7)
2022–	MKS Gogolin		

International career^{‡}
2009	Ukraine U17	6	(0)
2012	Ukraine U20	1	(0)
- * Club domestic league appearances and goals as of 25 August 2022 ‡ National team caps and goals as of 7 February 2016

Mykola Zhovtyuk (Ukrainian: Микола Володимирович Жовтюк; born 21 May 1992) is a Ukrainian professional footballer who plays as a defender for Polish IV liga club MKS Gogolin.

Zhovtyuk is the product of the UFK Lviv School System. He made his debut for FC Karpaty entering as a second-half substitute against FC Shakhtar Donetsk on 26 August 2012 in Ukrainian Premier League.

He also played for Ukrainian under-17 national football team and was called up for other age level representations.
