= Yaroslav Martynyuk =

Ukrainian footballer

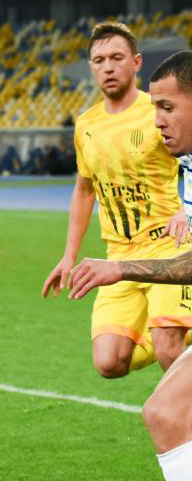
- Yaroslav Martynyuk playing for Rukh Lviv in 2021

Personal information
- Full name: Yaroslav Petrovych Martynyuk
- Date of birth: 20 February 1989 (age 37)
- Place of birth: Vinnytsia, Ukrainian SSR
- Height: 1.82 m (6 ft 0 in)
- Position: Midfielder

Youth career
- 2001–2002: Nyva-Svitanok Vinnytsia
- 2002–2006: Karpaty Lviv

Senior career*
Years	Team	Apps	(Gls)
2006–2014	Karpaty Lviv	52	(0)
2006–2008	→ Karpaty-2 Lviv	14	(2)
2013	→ Arsenal Kyiv (loan)	10	(1)
2015	Shakhtyor Soligorsk	15	(1)
2016	Olmaliq	12	(2)
2016–2019	Ermis Aradippou	88	(15)
2019–2022	Rukh Lviv	56	(2)
2022–2024	Metalist 1925 Kharkiv	36	(2)
2024	→ Dinaz Vyshhorod (loan)	9	(1)
Total		292	(26)

International career
2005	Ukraine U16	2	(0)
2006	Ukraine U17	7	(0)
2006–2007	Ukraine U18	14	(0)
2007–2008	Ukraine U19	16	(2)
- * Club domestic league appearances and goals as of 1 July 2024

Yaroslav Martynyuk (Ukrainian: Ярослав Петрович Мартинюк; born 20 February 1989) is a former Ukrainian professional footballer who played as a midfielder.

== Career ==
He is the product of the Karpaty Lviv Youth School System.
