= Ihor Ozarkiv =

Ukrainian footballer

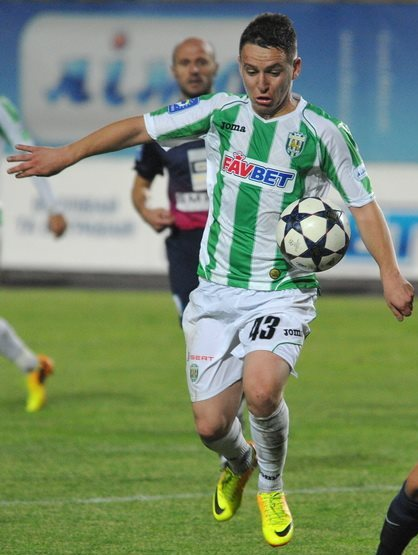
- Ihor Ozarkiv

Personal information
- Full name: Ihor Ihorovych Ozarkiv
- Date of birth: 21 January 1992 (age 34)
- Place of birth: Zhydachiv, Lviv Oblast, Ukraine
- Height: 1.76 m (5 ft 9 1/2 in)
- Position: Midfielder

Team information
- Current team: FC Kolkheti-1913 Poti

Youth career
- 2005–2008: FC Karpaty Lviv
- 2008: UFK Lviv
- 2008–2009: FC Karpaty Lviv

Senior career*
Years	Team	Apps	(Gls)
2009–2014	FC Karpaty Lviv	31	(1)
2009	→ FC Karpaty-2 Lviv	13	(1)
2014	→ PFC Oleksandria (loan)	4	(0)
2014–2015	FC Nyva Ternopil	41	(2)
2016–	FC Kolkheti-1913 Poti	0	(0)

International career^{‡}
2009–2010	Ukraine-18	12	(0)
2010–2011	Ukraine-19	8	(0)
2012	Ukraine-20	3	(0)
2012–2013	Ukraine-21	10	(0)
- * Club domestic league appearances and goals as of 8 August 2016 ‡ National team caps and goals as of 8 August 2016

Ihor Ozarkiv (Ukrainian: Ігор Ігорович Озарків; born 21 January 1992) is a professional Ukrainian footballer who plays as a midfielder for FC Kolkheti-1913 Poti.

== Career ==
Ozarkiv is a product of the Karpaty Lviv Youth School System. He made his debut for FC Karpaty entering as a second-half substitute against FC Volyn Lutsk on 1 October 2011 in Ukrainian Premier League.

He played for club FC Nyva Ternopil in Ukrainian First League. He also played for Ukrainian national football teams in different age representations.
