= Marcelinho (footballer, born 1990) =

Brazilian footballer

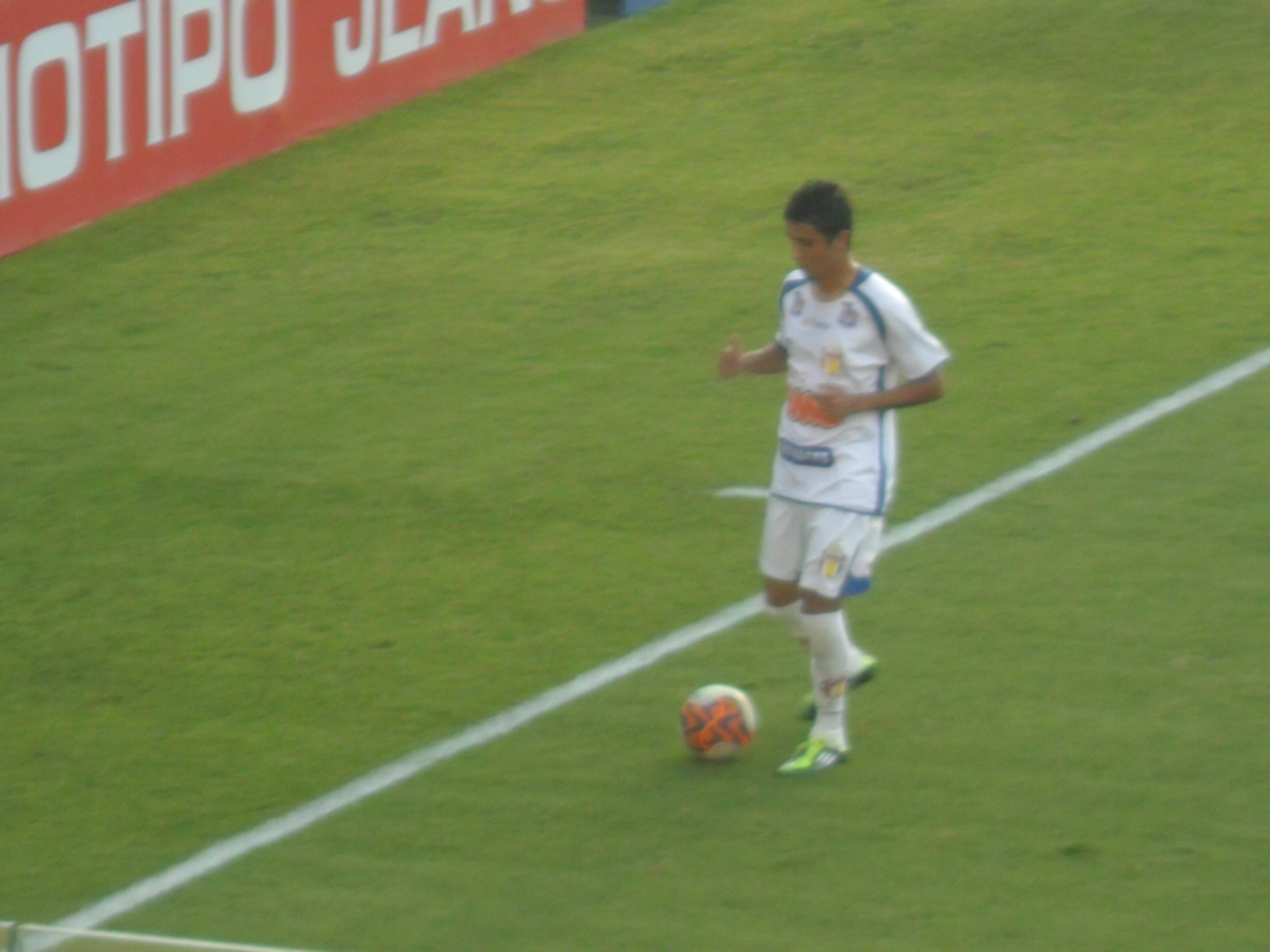

Personal information
- Full name: Marcelo Gil Fernando
- Date of birth: March 28, 1990 (age 36)
- Place of birth: Osasco, Brazil
- Height: 1.73 m (5 ft 8 in)
- Position: Striker

Team information
- Current team: XV de Piracicaba

Senior career*
Years	Team	Apps	(Gls)
2009–2011	Corinthians	12	(0)
2010	→ Monte Azul (loan)	12	(2)
2010	→ Ponte Preta (loan)	11	(1)
2011	→ Mirassol (loan)	18	(2)
2011–2013	Grêmio Barueri	80	(14)
2013–2016	Karpaty Lviv	14	(0)
2014	→ Ituano (loan)	8	(3)
2015	→ Oeste (loan)	6	(0)
2016–2019	Ituano	20	(0)
2016	→ Paraná (loan)	10	(0)
2017	→ Vila Nova (loan)	5	(0)
2018	→ São Bento (loan)	5	(0)
2020–	XV de Piracicaba	0	(0)
- * Club domestic league appearances and goals as of 20:58, 18 August 2020 (UTC)

Marcelo Gil Fernando or simple Marcelinho, born on 28 March 1990 in Osasco, São Paulo, is a professional Brazilian football player. He currently plays for XV de Piracicaba.

== Career ==
In 2009, he was Corinthians top scorer in the Copa São Paulo de Futebol Júnior. As a backup, he was also part of the team, who won the Brazil Cup and Championship the same year. But than he played on loan for different Brazilian teams.

In February 2013 he signed a contract with Karpaty Lviv in Ukrainian Premier League.

== Honours ==
Corinthians

- Campeonato Paulista: 2009
- Copa do Brasil: 2009

Ituano

- Campeonato Paulista: 2014
