= Levan Kenia =

Georgian football manager (born 1990)

Levan Kenia ლევან ყენია
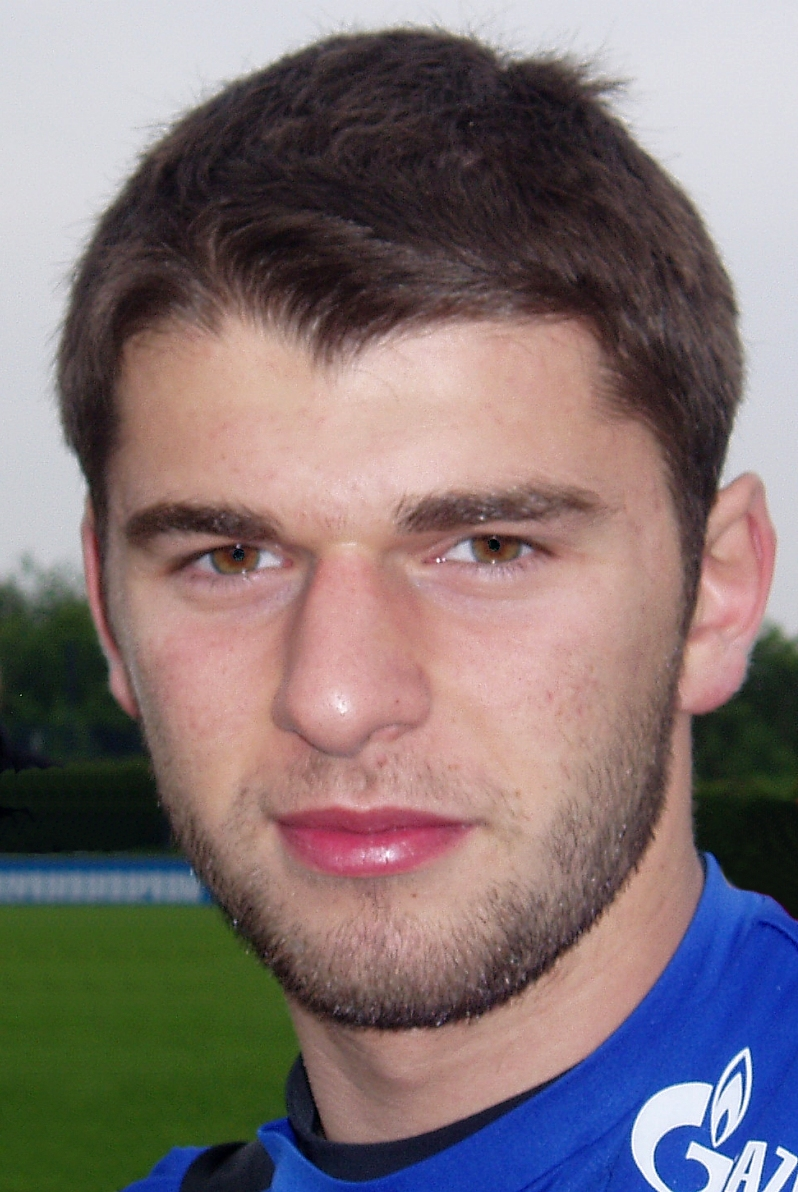
- Kenia with Schalke 04 in 2009

Personal information
- Date of birth: 18 October 1990 (age 36)
- Place of birth: Tbilisi, Georgia
- Height: 1.76 m (5 ft 9 in)
- Position: Attacking midfielder

Youth career
- 2004–2005: Dinamo Tbilisi
- 2005–2007: Lokomotivi Tbilisi

Senior career*
Years	Team	Apps	(Gls)
2007–2008	Lokomotivi Tbilisi	19	(4)
2008	Schalke 04 II	2	(0)
2009–2012	Schalke 04	11	(0)
2012–2013	Karpaty Lviv	20	(3)
2013–2014	Fortuna Düsseldorf	11	(0)
2014–2017	Slavia Prague	31	(3)
2017–2018	Lokomotivi Tbilisi	3	(0)
2018–2019	F91 Dudelange	11	(1)
2019–2020	Saburtalo	9	(0)
2021–2024	KFC Uerdingen	57	(6)
Total		174	(17)

International career
2006	Georgia U-17	2	(0)
2007–2008	Georgia U-19	5	(0)
2008–2012	Georgia U-21	5	(1)
2007–2016	Georgia	29	(4)

Managerial career
- 2024: KFC Uerdingen
- * Club domestic league appearances and goals

Levan Kenia (Georgian: ლევან ყენია; born 18 October 1990) is a Georgian professional football manager and former player who most recently was the head coach of Oberliga club KFC Uerdingen.

== Club career ==
Kenia joined Schalke 04 from Lokomotivi Tbilisi in January 2008, signing a contract with the club that ran until June 2012 Kenia made his debut for Schalke 04 against APOEL F.C. in a UEFA Cup match on 2 October 2008 coming on as a 65th-minute substitute for Gerald Asamoah. Formerly, Kenia trained for two weeks at the age of 14 with FC Barcelona.

On 11 April 2009, Kenia made his Bundesliga debut for Schalke in a match against Karlsruher SC.

On 14 August 2012, Kenia joined Ukrainian Premier League side FC Karpaty Lviv on a two-year contract. After spending one year in Ukraine, Kenia returned to Germany and signed a contract with Fortuna Düsseldorf for two years.

At Düsseldorf however he could never fulfill the expectations. Signed as the playmaker, he played only eleven games during the 2013–14 season. In the second half of the campaign he even earned just a single cap playing four minutes. On 1 July 2014, according to previous rumors, it was announced that his contract was dissolved.

In the summer of 2018, he joined Luxembourgish club Dudelange.

== International career ==
Kenia made his debut for the national team on 8 September 2007 against Ukraine, replacing Alexander Iashvili. Georgia's former head coach Klaus Toppmöller said he had never before seen a player of his age with such accomplished technical abilities. Kenia, along with fellow teenagers Levan Mchedlidze and Giorgi Makaridze, played in their UEFA Euro 2008 qualifying campaign starring in a 2–0 victory over Scotland. Toppmöller praised Kenia, "Kenia was one of the best on the pitch."

He scored his first international goal on 27 May 2008 against Estonia.

== Coaching career ==
In 2021 he joined German Regionalliga club KFC Uerdingen as playing assistant. Following the sacking of Marcus John in February 2024, Kenia was made new playing manager of the team. In March 2024, he retired from playing to become to manager of the team.

== Personal life ==
Levan is also the nephew of former SC Freiburg midfielder Georgi Kiknadze.

== Career statistics ==
=== Club ===
As of 25 July 2014

Appearances and goals by club, season and competition
Club	Season	League		Cup		Continental		Total	
Club	Season	Apps	Goals	Apps	Goals	Apps	Goals	Apps	Goals
Lokomotivi Tbilisi	2005–06	4	0	0	0	0	0	4	0
Lokomotivi Tbilisi	2006–07	11	3	0	0	0	0	11	3
Lokomotivi Tbilisi	2007–08	4	1	0	0	0	0	4	1
Lokomotivi Tbilisi	Total	19	4	0	0	0	0	19	4
Schalke 04	2008–09	1	0	0	0	1	0	2	0
Schalke 04	2009–10	10	0	2	1	0	0	12	1
Schalke 04	2010–11	0	0	0	0	0	0	0	0
Schalke 04	2011–12	0	0	0	0	0	0	0	0
Schalke 04	Total	11	0	2	1	1	0	14	1
Karpaty Lviv	2012–13	20	3	2	1	0	0	22	4
Fortuna Düsseldorf	2013–14	11	0	1	0	0	0	12	0
Career total		61	7	5	2	1	0	67	9

=== International ===
As of match played 27 May 2016
Scores and results list Georgia's goal tally first, score column indicates score after each Kenia goal.

List of international goals scored by Levan Kenia
No.	Date	Venue	Cap	Opponent	Score	Result	Competition
1	27 May 2008	A. Le Coq Arena, Tallinn, Estonia	9	Estonia	1–1	1–1	Friendly
2	20 August 2008	Liberty Stadium, Swansea, Wales	11	Wales	1–1	2–1	Friendly
3	6 September 2008	Stadion am Bruchweg, Mainz, Germany	12	Republic of Ireland	1–2	1–2	2010 FIFA World Cup qualification
4	27 May 2016	ASKÖ Stadion, Wels, Austria	27	Slovakia	1–3	1–3	Friendly
