= Armand Ken Ella =

Cameroonian football winger

Personal information
- Full name: Armand Ken Ella
- Date of birth: 23 February 1993 (age 33)
- Place of birth: Douala, Cameroon
- Height: 1.74 m (5 ft 9 in)
- Position: Midfielder

Team information
- Current team: AS Laval

Youth career
- 200?–2005: Samuel Eto'o Academy
- 2005–2012: Barcelona

Senior career*
Years	Team	Apps	(Gls)
2012–2014	Karpaty Lviv	3	(0)
2014	→ Kaposvári Rákóczi	0	(0)
2014–2016	Sandecja Nowy Sącz	11	(3)
2016	Free State Stars	8	(1)
2017–2019	Inhulets Petrove	58	(1)
2017–2018	→ Inhulets-2 Petrove	2	(0)
2020	Mash'al Mubarek	15	(0)
2021	Sandecja Nowy Sącz	6	(1)
2021–2022	Bukovyna Chernivtsi	15	(1)
2023–2025	CS Longueuil	34	(1)
2026-	AS Laval	15	(3)

International career^{‡}
2010–2011	Cameroon U20	8	(3)
- * Club domestic league appearances and goals as of 8 September 2024 ‡ National team caps and goals as of 23 June 2017

Armand Ken Ella (born 23 February 1993) is a Cameroonian footballer who plays as a Midfielder for AS Laval in Ligue1 Quebec.

== Club career ==
Ella is a product of the FC Barcelona Sportive Youth school. On 31 August 2012 he signed a contract with the Ukrainian football club FC Karpaty Lviv.

In March 2017 he returned to Ukraine and signed contract with FC Inhulets Petrove the Ukrainian First League.

== International career ==
He played in 8 matches and scored 3 goals for Cameroon national under-20 football team.
