= List of Ukrainian football transfers winter 2008–09 =

This is a list of Ukrainian football transfers in the winter transfer window 2008–09 by club. Only transfers of the Premier League, 1st League and 2nd League are included.

== Premier League ==
=== FC Arsenal Kyiv ===
In: Note: Flags indicate national team as defined under FIFA eligibility rules; some limited exceptions apply. Players may hold more than one non-FIFA nationality.

No.	Pos.	Nation	Player
—	FW	ROU	Ionuţ Mazilu (on loan from Dnipro)
—	DF	UKR	Bohdan Shershun (on loan from Dnipro)
—	MF	UKR	Ruslan Bidnenko (on loan from Dnipro)
—	DF	UKR	Vyacheslav Sviderskyi (on loan from Dnipro)
—	DF	UKR	Serhiy Matiukhin (on loan from Dnipro)
—	MF	RUS	Rolan Gusev (on loan from Dnipro)
--	FW	UKR	Oleksandr Ivaschenko (on loan from Kryvbas)

Out: Note: Flags indicate national team as defined under FIFA eligibility rules; some limited exceptions apply. Players may hold more than one non-FIFA nationality.

No.	Pos.	Nation	Player
11	MF	UKR	Denys Oliynyk (to Metalist Kharkiv)
29	DF	UKR	Vitaliy Mandzyuk (end of loan, to Dynamo Kyiv)

=== FC Chornomorets Odesa ===
In: Note: Flags indicate national team as defined under FIFA eligibility rules; some limited exceptions apply. Players may hold more than one non-FIFA nationality.

No.	Pos.	Nation	Player
13	DF	UKR	Roman Bochkur (return from loan from Dniester)
33	MF	UKR	Serhiy Polytilo (return from loan from Dniester)
--	MF	UKR	Adrian Pukanych (on loan from Shakhtar)
--	DF	UKR	Oleksandr Babych (from Metalist Kharkiv)
--	MF	SRB	Aleksandar Trišović (on loan from Metalist Kharkiv)
--	FW	UKR	Anatoliy Didenko (from Metalist Kharkiv)
27	DF	UKR	Vladyslav Vashchuk (from FC Lviv)

Out: Note: Flags indicate national team as defined under FIFA eligibility rules; some limited exceptions apply. Players may hold more than one non-FIFA nationality.

No.	Pos.	Nation	Player
2	DF	RUS	Gennadiy Nizhegorodov (to Lokomotiv)
11	FW	UKR	Oleh Venglinsky (contract expired)
14	DF	PER	Edgar Villamarín (to Universitario)
71	FW	ARG	Pablo Vitti (put on transfer market)
20	MF	UKR	Oleh Humenyuk (contract expired)
8	MF	UKR	Ruslan Hilaziv (contract expired)
88	DF	GEO	Kahaber Mzhavanadze (to FC Dacia Chişinău)
7	MF	BLR	Vladzimir Karytska (to Metalurh Donetsk)
19	MF	RUS	Yuri Mamaev (unemployed)
77	DF	UKR	Andriy Kornev (to Tavriya)
25	MF	PER	Paolo de la Haza (to Alianza Lima)
4	DF	ARG	Damián Giménez

=== FC Dnipro Dnipropetrovsk ===
In: Note: Flags indicate national team as defined under FIFA eligibility rules; some limited exceptions apply. Players may hold more than one non-FIFA nationality.

No.	Pos.	Nation	Player
3	DF	UKR	Vyacheslav Serdyuk (returned from loan from Kryvbas)
35	MF	UKR	Pavlo Pashaiv (returned from loan from Kryvbas)
TBA	FW	UKR	Volodymyr Homenyuk (from Tavriya)
8	FW	GEO	Beka Gotsiridze (from FC Zestaponi)
TBA	MF	CRO	Mladen Bartulović (end of loan, return from Kryvbas)
15	DF	UKR	Serhiy Matiukhin (end of loan, from Kryvas)
4	DF	UKR	Yevhen Baryshnikov (end of loan, from Naftovyk)
12	GK	UKR	Yevhen Borovyk (from Kryvbas)

Out: Note: Flags indicate national team as defined under FIFA eligibility rules; some limited exceptions apply. Players may hold more than one non-FIFA nationality.

No.	Pos.	Nation	Player
1	GK	UKR	Maksym Startsev (to Tavriya)
4	DF	UKR	Bohdan Shershun (on loan to Arsenal Kyiv)
6	MF	UKR	Oleh Shelayev (on 6 months loan to Kryvbas Kryvyi Rih – until the end of his contract with Dnipro)
3	DF	UKR	Olexandr Hrytsay (on loan to Kryvbas Kryvyi Rih)
5	DF	UKR	Vyacheslav Sviderskyi (to SC Tavriya Simferopol)
13	DF	RUS	Andrey Eschenko (end of loan, to Dynamo Kyiv)
22	MF	UKR	Denys Andriyenko (on loan to Kryvbas)
24	DF	CIV	Igor Lolo (to AS Monaco)
9	FW	ROU	Ionuţ Mazilu (on loan to Arsenal Kyiv)
88	MF	RUS	Rolan Gusev (on loan to Arsenal Kyiv)
--	MF	UKR	Ruslan Bidnenko (on loan to Arsenal Kyiv)
15	DF	UKR	Serhiy Matiukhin (on loan to Arsenal Kyiv)
27	MF	BRA	Davidson Morais (free agent)

=== FC Dynamo Kyiv ===
In: Note: Flags indicate national team as defined under FIFA eligibility rules; some limited exceptions apply. Players may hold more than one non-FIFA nationality.

No.	Pos.	Nation	Player
—	MF	UKR	Pavlo Ksyonz (return from loan from Illychivets)
14	MF	UKR	Serhiy Kravchenko (from Vorskla Poltava)
38	MF	BRA	Diogo Rincón (end of loan, from Corinthians)
—	FW	UKR	Kostiantyn Dudchenko (from Olkom Melitopol)
77	FW	BRA	Guilherme (from Cruzeiro)
—	MF	UKR	Oleh Herasymyuk (end of loan, from Neftchi)
29	DF	UKR	Vitaliy Mandzyuk (end of loan, from Arsenal Kyiv)

Out: Note: Flags indicate national team as defined under FIFA eligibility rules; some limited exceptions apply. Players may hold more than one non-FIFA nationality.

No.	Pos.	Nation	Player
—	MF	UKR	Denys Oliynyk (to Metalist Kharkiv)
—	FW	GEO	Otar Martsvaladze (to Anzhi Makhachkala)
—	DF	GEO	Kakhaber Aladashvili (to Anzhi Makhachkala)
—	FW	BRA	Kléber (to Cruzeiro)
13	DF	RUS	Andrey Eschenko (on loan to Spartak Nalchik)
24	DF	UKR	Vitaliy Fedoriv (to Amkar Perm)
11	MF	UKR	Pavlo Ksyonz (on loan to FC Kharkiv)

=== FC Illychivets Mariupol ===
In: Note: Flags indicate national team as defined under FIFA eligibility rules; some limited exceptions apply. Players may hold more than one non-FIFA nationality.

No.	Pos.	Nation	Player
23	DF	UKR	Ihor Korotetskyy (on loan from Shakhtar)

Out: Note: Flags indicate national team as defined under FIFA eligibility rules; some limited exceptions apply. Players may hold more than one non-FIFA nationality.

No.	Pos.	Nation	Player
22	MF	UKR	Pavlo Ksyonz (return from loan to Dynamo)
27	FW	BLR	Pavel Byahanski
15	FW	UKR	Oleksandr Ivaschenko (end of loan, to Kryvbas)
7	MF	UKR	Oleksiy Polyansky (end of loan, to Shakhtar Donetsk)
3	DF	BRA	Corrêa (to Esporte Clube Bahia)
16	MF	UKR	Oleksandr Shevelyukhin

=== FC Karpaty Lviv ===
In: Note: Flags indicate national team as defined under FIFA eligibility rules; some limited exceptions apply. Players may hold more than one non-FIFA nationality.

No.	Pos.	Nation	Player
TBA	DF	SRB	Nemanja Tubić (from K.R.C. Genk)
TBA	MF	GAB	Thierry Issiemou (from Vasas SC)
TBA	FW	BRA	Rodrigo Silva (from KÍ Klaksvík)

Out: Note: Flags indicate national team as defined under FIFA eligibility rules; some limited exceptions apply. Players may hold more than one non-FIFA nationality.

No.	Pos.	Nation	Player
10	FW	UKR	Maxym Feschuk (to Tavriya)
37	GK	UKR	Yuriy Martyschuk (put on transfer market)
7	MF	NGA	Samson Godwin (on transfers market)
31	FW	UKR	Yaroslav Svorak (put on transfer market)
29	MF	UKR	Anton Lutsyk (put on transfer market)
--	MF	GAB	Thierry Issiemou (released)
--	FW	BRA	Rodrigo Silva (released)

=== FC Kharkiv ===
In: Note: Flags indicate national team as defined under FIFA eligibility rules; some limited exceptions apply. Players may hold more than one non-FIFA nationality.

No.	Pos.	Nation	Player
9	FW	UKR	Taras Kabanov (on loan from FC Metalurh Zaporizhya)
11	MF	UKR	Pavlo Ksyonz (on loan from Dynamo Kyiv)
50	DF	UKR	Andriy Fartushnyak (on loan from Dynamo Kyiv II)
4	DF	UKR	Volodymyr Kornutiak (from Prykarpattya)
21	FW	UKR	Yevheniy Ushakov (from Zorya Luhansk Reserves)
6	MF	UKR	Serhiy Koziuberda (from Sūduva (Lithuania))

Out: Note: Flags indicate national team as defined under FIFA eligibility rules; some limited exceptions apply. Players may hold more than one non-FIFA nationality.

No.	Pos.	Nation	Player
17	MF	BLR	Alyaksey Suchkow (put on transfer market)
4	DF	UKR	Andriy Sokolenko (contract expired)
9	FW	BRA	William Batista (on 6 month loan to FK Baku, with permission to buy out contract)
3	DF	UKR	Ivan Kozoriz
10	MF	BRA	Anderson Ribeiro
11	MF	UKR	Oleksandr Pikhur
21	MF	UKR	Oleksiy Gorodov
35	MF	UKR	Ruslan Hunchak

=== FC Kryvbas Kryvyi Rih ===
In: Note: Flags indicate national team as defined under FIFA eligibility rules; some limited exceptions apply. Players may hold more than one non-FIFA nationality.

No.	Pos.	Nation	Player
12	GK	ALB	Isli Hidi (from Alki Larnaca FC)
TBA	MF	UKR	Oleh Shelayev (On 6 months loan from Dnipro)
15	FW	UKR	Oleksandr Ivaschenko (end of loan, from Illichivets)
TBA	MF	UKR	Denys Andriyenko (on loan from Dnipro)
TBA	DF	UKR	Olexandr Hrytsay (on loan from Dnipro)
26	FW	UKR	Yuriy Kolomiyets (end of loan, from Naftovyk)
21	FW	UKR	Roman Karakevych (from Naftovyk)
25	DF	UKR	Serhiy Karpenko (from Naftovyk)
--	MF	UKR	Yuri Bulychev (from PFC Olexandria)
--	GK	UKR	Yevhen Deyneko (from FC Dnipro Cherkasy)
27	FW	UKR	Yuriy Bulychiv (to Olexandria)

Out: Note: Flags indicate national team as defined under FIFA eligibility rules; some limited exceptions apply. Players may hold more than one non-FIFA nationality.

No.	Pos.	Nation	Player
11	MF	CRO	Mladen Bartulović (end of loan, return to Dnipro)
3	DF	UKR	Vyacheslav Serdyuk (end of loan, return to Dnipro)
35	MF	UKR	Pavlo Pashaiv (end of loan, return to Dnipro)
21	MF	BLR	Ihar Razhkow (free agent starting on February 1, 2009)
2	DF	UKR	Oleh Koteliukh (free agent)
33	DF	CMR	Patrick Ibanda (free agent)
--	FW	UKR	Oleksandr Ivaschenko (on to Arsenal Kyiv)

=== FC Lviv ===
In: Note: Flags indicate national team as defined under FIFA eligibility rules; some limited exceptions apply. Players may hold more than one non-FIFA nationality.

No.	Pos.	Nation	Player
25	DF	UKR	Andriy Mostovy (from Knyazha)
73	DF	UKR	Vladyslav Lupashko (from Knyazha)
9	FW	UKR	Oleksandr Mandzyuk (from Knyazha)
11	MF	UKR	Evhen Chepurenko (from Knyazha)
—	DF	UKR	Vitali Rozgon (from Tavria)

Out: Note: Flags indicate national team as defined under FIFA eligibility rules; some limited exceptions apply. Players may hold more than one non-FIFA nationality.

No.	Pos.	Nation	Player
27	DF	UKR	Vladyslav Vashchuk (to FC Chornomorets Odesa)
10	FW	UKR	Dmytro Hordienko
10	FW	UKR	Oleh Teplyy
11	MF	UKR	Evhen Chepurenko
12	GK	UKR	Andriy Bandrivskyy
12	GK	UKR	Oleksandr Vysotskyy
13	FW	UKR	Dmytro Kozban
15	DF	UKR	Rostyslav Horetskyy
15	FW	UKR	Dmytro Zozulya
16	FW	UKR	Yaroslav Sukhotskyy
18	FW	UKR	Yevheniy Chepurnenko
21	FW	UKR	Maryan Sloboda

=== FC Metalist Kharkiv ===
In: Note: Flags indicate national team as defined under FIFA eligibility rules; some limited exceptions apply. Players may hold more than one non-FIFA nationality.

No.	Pos.	Nation	Player
4	DF	UKR	Andriy Berezovchuk (from FC Metalurh Donetsk)
11	MF	UKR	Denys Oliynyk (from Dynamo Kyiv)
89	GK	UKR	Denys Sydorenko (return from loan from Dniester)
32	MF	ARG	Walter Acevedo (loan-to-contract from San Lorenzo)
TBA	FW	UKR	Anatoliy Didenko (end of loan, from Zorya)

Out: Note: Flags indicate national team as defined under FIFA eligibility rules; some limited exceptions apply. Players may hold more than one non-FIFA nationality.

No.	Pos.	Nation	Player
—	FW	UKR	Anatoliy Didenko (to Chornomorets)
10	MF	SRB	Aleksandar Trišović (to Chornomorets)
5	DF	UKR	Oleksandr Babych (to Chornomorets)
4	MF	CIV	Abdoulaye Djire (released)
24	FW	UKR	Ruslan Fomin (end of loan, to Shakhtar Donetsk)
88	DF	UKR	Oleksiy Kurylov (on loan to Zorya)

=== FC Metalurh Donetsk ===
In: Note: Flags indicate national team as defined under FIFA eligibility rules; some limited exceptions apply. Players may hold more than one non-FIFA nationality.

No.	Pos.	Nation	Player
5	DF	POR	China (from C.F. Os Belenenses)
TBA	MF	SRB	Đorđe Lazić (from FK Partizan for 500,000 euro)
--	MF	BLR	Vladzimir Karitska (from Chornomorets)
21	FW	BRA	Ze Soares (from Levski)

Out: Note: Flags indicate national team as defined under FIFA eligibility rules; some limited exceptions apply. Players may hold more than one non-FIFA nationality.

No.	Pos.	Nation	Player
7	DF	UKR	Andriy Berezovchuk (to FC Metalist Kharkiv)
21	MF	ARM	Samvel Melkonyan (to FC Banants)
—	FW	BRA	William Boaventura (on loan to Kuban)

=== FC Metalurh Zaporizhya ===
In: Note: Flags indicate national team as defined under FIFA eligibility rules; some limited exceptions apply. Players may hold more than one non-FIFA nationality.

No.	Pos.	Nation	Player
TBA	MF	LTU	Mindaugas Kalonas (from Bohemian F.C.)

Out: Note: Flags indicate national team as defined under FIFA eligibility rules; some limited exceptions apply. Players may hold more than one non-FIFA nationality.

No.	Pos.	Nation	Player
2	DF	BLR	Artem Chelyadinsky (to FC Tobol)
9	FW	UKR	Taras Kabanov (on loan to FC Kharkiv)

=== FC Shakhtar Donetsk ===
In: Note: Flags indicate national team as defined under FIFA eligibility rules; some limited exceptions apply. Players may hold more than one non-FIFA nationality.

No.	Pos.	Nation	Player
—	FW	UKR	Maksym Illyuk (from Bukovyna)
37	MF	UKR	Maksym Trusevych (end of loan – from Zorya)
5	DF	UKR	Ihor Korotetskyy (end of loan – from Zorya)
24	FW	UKR	Ruslan Fomin (return from loan from Metalist)
28	MF	UKR	Oleksiy Polyansky (end of loan, from Illychivets)
9	FW	MEX	Nery Castillo (end of loan, from Manchester City)
--	DF	UKR	Oleh Yermak (end of loan, from Zorya)

Out: Note: Flags indicate national team as defined under FIFA eligibility rules; some limited exceptions apply. Players may hold more than one non-FIFA nationality.

No.	Pos.	Nation	Player
—	MF	UKR	Konstantyn Yaroshenko (on loan to Vorskla)
—	FW	BRA	Brandão (to Marseille starting on Jan 14, 2009)
--	MF	UKR	Maksym Trusevych (to Baltika)
14	MF	UKR	Yevhen Bredun (free agent)
5	DF	UKR	Ihor Korotetskyy (on loan to Illichivets)

=== SC Tavriya Simferopol ===
In: Note: Flags indicate national team as defined under FIFA eligibility rules; some limited exceptions apply. Players may hold more than one non-FIFA nationality.

No.	Pos.	Nation	Player
TBA	FW	UKR	Matviy Bobal (from Ihroservice)
TBA	DF	CRO	Sasha Juričić (from Vorskla)
TBA	DF	UKR	Andriy Kornev (from Chornomorets)
TBA	FW	UKR	Maxym Feschuk (from Karpaty)
TBA	GK	UKR	Maksym Startsev (from Dnipro on a 2 year contract)
TBA	DF	UKR	Anton Monakhov (from Naftovyk on a 2 year contract)
17	DF	UKR	Yevheniy Pichkur (from Krymteplitsia)
72	GK	UKR	Ihor Lytovka (on loan from Sevastopol)
17	DF	UKR	Vyacheslav Sviderskyi (from Dnipro)

Out: Note: Flags indicate national team as defined under FIFA eligibility rules; some limited exceptions apply. Players may hold more than one non-FIFA nationality.

No.	Pos.	Nation	Player
1	GK	SRB	Saša Todić (to Krymteplitsia)
55	DF	BLR	Yawhen Linyow (contract expired, to Gomel)
—	DF	UKR	Vitali Rozgon (to FC Lviv)
11	FW	UKR	Volodymyr Homenyuk (to Dnipro)
31	GK	UKR	Andriy Dikan (to Terek)
15	DF	UKR	Dmytro Nazarov (free agent)
2	DF	UKR	Andriy Boyko (to Vorskla)

=== FC Vorskla Poltava ===
In: Note: Flags indicate national team as defined under FIFA eligibility rules; some limited exceptions apply. Players may hold more than one non-FIFA nationality.

No.	Pos.	Nation	Player
—	MF	UKR	Konstantyn Yaroshenko (on 1 year loan from Shakhtar)
TBA	GK	UKR	Serhiy Velychko (from Naftovyk)
9	FW	UKR	Roman Bezus (from Kremenchuk)
19	FW	UKR	Roman Kunev (from Kremenchuk)
2	DF	UKR	Andriy Boyko (from Tavria)

Out: Note: Flags indicate national team as defined under FIFA eligibility rules; some limited exceptions apply. Players may hold more than one non-FIFA nationality.

No.	Pos.	Nation	Player
14	MF	UKR	Serhiy Kravchenko (to Dynamo Kyiv)
32	DF	CRO	Sasha Juričić (to Tavriya)

=== FC Zorya Luhansk ===
In: Note: Flags indicate national team as defined under FIFA eligibility rules; some limited exceptions apply. Players may hold more than one non-FIFA nationality.

No.	Pos.	Nation	Player
28	DF	UKR	Oleksiy Kurylov (on loan from Metalist)
17	MF	UKR	Serhiy Kolesnychenko (from Darida)
—	MF	UKR	Yuriy Fedosenko (from Desna)
—	FW	UKR	Dmytro Moldovan (from Shakhtar Reserves)

Out: Note: Flags indicate national team as defined under FIFA eligibility rules; some limited exceptions apply. Players may hold more than one non-FIFA nationality.

No.	Pos.	Nation	Player
50	FW	UKR	Yevheniy Ushakov (to FC Kharkiv)
13	DF	UKR	Serhiy Siminin (to Zakarpattia)
37	MF	UKR	Maksym Trusevych (end of loan – to Shakhtar)
5	DF	UKR	Ihor Korotetskyy (end of loan – to Shakhtar)
19	FW	UKR	Anatoliy Didenko (end of loan, to Metalist)
29	DF	UKR	Oleh Yermak (end of loan, to Shakhtar)

== First League ==
=== FC Desna Chernihiv ===
In: Note: Flags indicate national team as defined under FIFA eligibility rules; some limited exceptions apply. Players may hold more than one non-FIFA nationality.

No.	Pos.	Nation	Player

Out: Note: Flags indicate national team as defined under FIFA eligibility rules; some limited exceptions apply. Players may hold more than one non-FIFA nationality.

No.	Pos.	Nation	Player
—	MF	UKR	Yuriy Fedosenko (to Zorya Luhansk)

=== FC Dniester Ovidiopol ===
In: Note: Flags indicate national team as defined under FIFA eligibility rules; some limited exceptions apply. Players may hold more than one non-FIFA nationality.

No.	Pos.	Nation	Player
—	DF	UKR	Dmytro Parkhomenko (from FC Banants)
—	MF	UKR	Yevhen Osadchuk (from PFC Nyva Vinnytsia)

Out: Note: Flags indicate national team as defined under FIFA eligibility rules; some limited exceptions apply. Players may hold more than one non-FIFA nationality.

No.	Pos.	Nation	Player
6	DF	UKR	Mykola Vitvitskiy (released)
25	DF	UKR	Andriy Chernov (released)
21	DF	UKR	Denys Kopchyn (released)
18	MF	UKR	Ruslan Yermolenko (released)
23	MF	UKR	Roman Hetsko (released)
28	MF	UKR	Oleksandr Zabara (to Olexandria)
14	MF	UKR	Igor Pokarinin (released)
89	GK	UKR	Denys Sydorenko (end of loan, to Metalist)
13	DF	UKR	Roman Bochkur (end of loan, to Chornomorets)
33	MF	UKR	Serhiy Polytilo (end of loan, to Chornomorets)
2	DF	UKR	Yaroslav Lafazan (free agent)

=== FC Dynamo-2 Kyiv ===
In: Note: Flags indicate national team as defined under FIFA eligibility rules; some limited exceptions apply. Players may hold more than one non-FIFA nationality.

No.	Pos.	Nation	Player
—	MF	UKR	Oleh Herasymyuk (returned from loan from PFC Neftchi Baku)

Out: Note: Flags indicate national team as defined under FIFA eligibility rules; some limited exceptions apply. Players may hold more than one non-FIFA nationality.

No.	Pos.	Nation	Player
25	DF	GEO	Kahaber Aladashvili (to Anzhi)
77	FW	GEO	Otar Martsvaladze (to Anzhi)
5	DF	UKR	Andriy Fartushnyak (on loan to FC Kharkiv)

=== FC Enerhetyk Burshtyn ===
In: Note: Flags indicate national team as defined under FIFA eligibility rules; some limited exceptions apply. Players may hold more than one non-FIFA nationality.

No.	Pos.	Nation	Player

Out: Note: Flags indicate national team as defined under FIFA eligibility rules; some limited exceptions apply. Players may hold more than one non-FIFA nationality.

No.	Pos.	Nation	Player

=== FC Feniks-Illychovets Kalinine ===
In: Note: Flags indicate national team as defined under FIFA eligibility rules; some limited exceptions apply. Players may hold more than one non-FIFA nationality.

No.	Pos.	Nation	Player

Out: Note: Flags indicate national team as defined under FIFA eligibility rules; some limited exceptions apply. Players may hold more than one non-FIFA nationality.

No.	Pos.	Nation	Player
—	DF	UKR	Vitaliy Kalinichenko (to Zakarpattia)
—	FW	UKR	Vitaliy Prokopcheno (to Zakarpattia)

=== FC Helios Kharkiv ===
In: Note: Flags indicate national team as defined under FIFA eligibility rules; some limited exceptions apply. Players may hold more than one non-FIFA nationality.

No.	Pos.	Nation	Player
—	MF	UKR	Marat Daudov (from Zorya Reserves)
—	FW	UKR	Ihor Leonov (from Zorya Reserves)
—	GK	UKR	Shamil Vamayev
—	DF	UKR	Yuriy Tkatchev
—	DF	UKR	Oleksandr Cherednichenko
—	MF	UKR	Amiran Tsabria
—	FW	UKR	Konstantyn Rud'

Out: Note: Flags indicate national team as defined under FIFA eligibility rules; some limited exceptions apply. Players may hold more than one non-FIFA nationality.

No.	Pos.	Nation	Player
12	GK	UKR	Denys Shapovalov (released)
—	GK	UKR	Anatoliy Pylypenko (released)
—	MF	UKR	Maksym Nykytskyj (released)
—	FW	UKR	Maksym Otryshko (released)
—	FW	UKR	Dmytro Viter (to Naftovyk)
—	MF	UKR	Vitaliy Sobko (to Kremin)

=== FC Ihroservice Simferopol ===
In: Note: Flags indicate national team as defined under FIFA eligibility rules; some limited exceptions apply. Players may hold more than one non-FIFA nationality.

No.	Pos.	Nation	Player

Out: Note: Flags indicate national team as defined under FIFA eligibility rules; some limited exceptions apply. Players may hold more than one non-FIFA nationality.

No.	Pos.	Nation	Player
1	GK	UKR	Roman Yerechenko
—	DF	UKR	Yevheniy Lahnyuk
19	FW	UKR	Matviy Bobal (to Tavria)
20	MF	UKR	Vladymyr Symonchuk (to Krymteplitsia)
23	DF	UKR	Artem Pidhaynyy
—	DF	UKR	Oleksandr Matviychuk
—	MF	UKR	Maksym Osadchuk
—	MF	UKR	Roman Salnyk

=== FC Knyazha Schaslyve ===
In: Note: Flags indicate national team as defined under FIFA eligibility rules; some limited exceptions apply. Players may hold more than one non-FIFA nationality.

No.	Pos.	Nation	Player

Out: Note: Flags indicate national team as defined under FIFA eligibility rules; some limited exceptions apply. Players may hold more than one non-FIFA nationality.

No.	Pos.	Nation	Player
25	DF	UKR	Andriy Mostovy (to FC Lviv)
73	DF	UKR	Vladyslav Lupashko (to FC Lviv)
9	FW	UKR	Oleksandr Mandziuk (to FC Lviv)
11	MF	UKR	Evhen Chepurenko (to FC Lviv)

=== FC Krymteplitsia Molodizhne ===
In: Note: Flags indicate national team as defined under FIFA eligibility rules; some limited exceptions apply. Players may hold more than one non-FIFA nationality.

No.	Pos.	Nation	Player
TBA	MF	UKR	Vladymyr Symonchuk (from Ihroservice)
TBA	GK	SRB	Saša Todić (from Tavriya)
TBA	MF	UKR	Dmitriy Trukhin (from Stal Alchevsk)
TBA	DF	UKR	Timur Novotriasov (a graduate from the Olympic Reserve college)
5	DF	UKR	Vadym Ishmakov (from FC Dinamo Brest)

Out: Note: Flags indicate national team as defined under FIFA eligibility rules; some limited exceptions apply. Players may hold more than one non-FIFA nationality.

No.	Pos.	Nation	Player
7	MF	UKR	Stanyslav Pechionkin (put on transfer market)
15	MF	UKR	Maksym Bondarenko (put on transfer market)
—	MF	UKR	Maksym Kryvovyazyy (put on transfer market)
17	DF	UKR	Yevheniy Pichkur (to Tavria)

=== FC Naftovyk-Ukrnafta Okhtyrka ===
In: Note: Flags indicate national team as defined under FIFA eligibility rules; some limited exceptions apply. Players may hold more than one non-FIFA nationality.

No.	Pos.	Nation	Player
—	FW	UKR	Dmytro Viter (from Helios)
18	MF	UKR	Ivan Pohorilyy (from PFC Olexandria)

Out: Note: Flags indicate national team as defined under FIFA eligibility rules; some limited exceptions apply. Players may hold more than one non-FIFA nationality.

No.	Pos.	Nation	Player
--	GK	UKR	Serhiy Velychko (to Vorskla)
TBA	DF	UKR	Anton Monakhov (to Tavriya)
4	DF	UKR	Yevhen Baryshnikov (end of loan, to Dnipro)
26	FW	UKR	Yuriy Kolomiyets (end of loan, to Kryvbas)
9	MF	UKR	Anatoli Kretov (on transfer market)
—	MF	SRB	Branko Baković (on transfer market)
19	DF	MDA	Eduard Valutsa (to Kazakhstan)
21	FW	UKR	Roman Karakevych (to Kryvbas)
25	DF	UKR	Serhiy Karpenko (to Kryvbas)

=== FC Obolon Kyiv ===
In: Note: Flags indicate national team as defined under FIFA eligibility rules; some limited exceptions apply. Players may hold more than one non-FIFA nationality.

No.	Pos.	Nation	Player

Out: Note: Flags indicate national team as defined under FIFA eligibility rules; some limited exceptions apply. Players may hold more than one non-FIFA nationality.

No.	Pos.	Nation	Player

=== PFC Olexandria ===
In: Note: Flags indicate national team as defined under FIFA eligibility rules; some limited exceptions apply. Players may hold more than one non-FIFA nationality.

No.	Pos.	Nation	Player
32	MF	UKR	Andriy Smalko (from Stal Alchevsk)
TBA		UKR	Valeriy Buhaychuk
TBA		UKR	Dmytro Suspitsyn
28	MF	UKR	Oleksandr Zabara (from Dniester)

Out: Note: Flags indicate national team as defined under FIFA eligibility rules; some limited exceptions apply. Players may hold more than one non-FIFA nationality.

No.	Pos.	Nation	Player
27	FW	UKR	Yuriy Bulychiv (to Kryvbas)
—	DF	UKR	Deny Marynchuk
—	DF	UKR	A. Pervak
—	MF	UKR	B. Azarov
—	MF	UKR	A. Prokopov
—	MF	UKR	E. Kolesnyk
—	MF	UKR	A. Honchar
—	FW	UKR	A. Hrebyniuk
—	FW	UKR	B. Kylikevych
18	MF	UKR	Ivan Pohorilyy (to Naftovyk)

=== FSC Prykarpattya Ivano-Frankivsk ===
In: Note: Flags indicate national team as defined under FIFA eligibility rules; some limited exceptions apply. Players may hold more than one non-FIFA nationality.

No.	Pos.	Nation	Player

Out: Note: Flags indicate national team as defined under FIFA eligibility rules; some limited exceptions apply. Players may hold more than one non-FIFA nationality.

No.	Pos.	Nation	Player
4	DF	UKR	Volodymyr Kornutiak (to FC Kharkiv)

=== PFC Sevastopol ===
In: Note: Flags indicate national team as defined under FIFA eligibility rules; some limited exceptions apply. Players may hold more than one non-FIFA nationality.

No.	Pos.	Nation	Player
72	GK	UKR	Ihor Lytovka (on loan to Tavria)

Out: Note: Flags indicate national team as defined under FIFA eligibility rules; some limited exceptions apply. Players may hold more than one non-FIFA nationality.

No.	Pos.	Nation	Player

=== FC Stal Alchevsk ===
In: Note: Flags indicate national team as defined under FIFA eligibility rules; some limited exceptions apply. Players may hold more than one non-FIFA nationality.

No.	Pos.	Nation	Player

Out: Note: Flags indicate national team as defined under FIFA eligibility rules; some limited exceptions apply. Players may hold more than one non-FIFA nationality.

No.	Pos.	Nation	Player
15	MF	UKR	Dmitriy Trukhin (to Krymteplitsia)
23	DF	UKR	Vitaliy Lotz (to Salyut-Energia)
25	FW	MDA	Valeriu Onila
10	MF	UKR	Andriy Illchyshyn

=== FC Volyn Lutsk ===
In: Note: Flags indicate national team as defined under FIFA eligibility rules; some limited exceptions apply. Players may hold more than one non-FIFA nationality.

No.	Pos.	Nation	Player

Out: Note: Flags indicate national team as defined under FIFA eligibility rules; some limited exceptions apply. Players may hold more than one non-FIFA nationality.

No.	Pos.	Nation	Player
32	FW	MDA	Oleg Hromțov
37	MF	UKR	Yuriy Voytovych
2	DF	UKR	Volodymyr Kovaliuk

=== FC Zakarpattia Uzhhorod ===
In: Note: Flags indicate national team as defined under FIFA eligibility rules; some limited exceptions apply. Players may hold more than one non-FIFA nationality.

No.	Pos.	Nation	Player
23	MF	UKR	Vladyslav Mykulyak (extended contract until the end of the season)
13	DF	UKR	Serhiy Siminin (from Zorya)
30	FW	UKR	Myroslav Bundash (returning from Kazakhstan)
—	DF	UKR	Vitaliy Kalinichenko (from Feniks-Illychovets)
—	FW	UKR	Vitaliy Prokopcheno (from Feniks-Illychovets)

Out: Note: Flags indicate national team as defined under FIFA eligibility rules; some limited exceptions apply. Players may hold more than one non-FIFA nationality.

No.	Pos.	Nation	Player
23	MF	UKR	Vladyslav Mykulyak (to Standard Liège starting January 1, 2009)
7	GK	UKR	Konstantyn Babych (broke contract)

== Ukrainian Second League ==
=== Druha A ===
==== FC Arsenal Bila Tserkva ====
In: Note: Flags indicate national team as defined under FIFA eligibility rules; some limited exceptions apply. Players may hold more than one non-FIFA nationality.

No.	Pos.	Nation	Player

Out: Note: Flags indicate national team as defined under FIFA eligibility rules; some limited exceptions apply. Players may hold more than one non-FIFA nationality.

No.	Pos.	Nation	Player

==== FC Bastion Illichivsk ====
In: Note: Flags indicate national team as defined under FIFA eligibility rules; some limited exceptions apply. Players may hold more than one non-FIFA nationality.

No.	Pos.	Nation	Player

Out: Note: Flags indicate national team as defined under FIFA eligibility rules; some limited exceptions apply. Players may hold more than one non-FIFA nationality.

No.	Pos.	Nation	Player

==== FC Bukovyna Chernivtsi ====
In: Note: Flags indicate national team as defined under FIFA eligibility rules; some limited exceptions apply. Players may hold more than one non-FIFA nationality.

No.	Pos.	Nation	Player

Out: Note: Flags indicate national team as defined under FIFA eligibility rules; some limited exceptions apply. Players may hold more than one non-FIFA nationality.

No.	Pos.	Nation	Player
—	FW	UKR	Maksym Iliuk (to Shakhtar)

==== FC CSKA Kyiv ====
In: Note: Flags indicate national team as defined under FIFA eligibility rules; some limited exceptions apply. Players may hold more than one non-FIFA nationality.

No.	Pos.	Nation	Player

Out: Note: Flags indicate national team as defined under FIFA eligibility rules; some limited exceptions apply. Players may hold more than one non-FIFA nationality.

No.	Pos.	Nation	Player

==== FC Dnipro Cherkasy ====
In: Note: Flags indicate national team as defined under FIFA eligibility rules; some limited exceptions apply. Players may hold more than one non-FIFA nationality.

No.	Pos.	Nation	Player

Out: Note: Flags indicate national team as defined under FIFA eligibility rules; some limited exceptions apply. Players may hold more than one non-FIFA nationality.

No.	Pos.	Nation	Player

==== FC Karpaty-2 Lviv ====
In: Note: Flags indicate national team as defined under FIFA eligibility rules; some limited exceptions apply. Players may hold more than one non-FIFA nationality.

No.	Pos.	Nation	Player

Out: Note: Flags indicate national team as defined under FIFA eligibility rules; some limited exceptions apply. Players may hold more than one non-FIFA nationality.

No.	Pos.	Nation	Player

==== FC Knyazha-2 Schaslyve ====
In: Note: Flags indicate national team as defined under FIFA eligibility rules; some limited exceptions apply. Players may hold more than one non-FIFA nationality.

No.	Pos.	Nation	Player

Out: Note: Flags indicate national team as defined under FIFA eligibility rules; some limited exceptions apply. Players may hold more than one non-FIFA nationality.

No.	Pos.	Nation	Player

==== FC Korosten ====
In: Note: Flags indicate national team as defined under FIFA eligibility rules; some limited exceptions apply. Players may hold more than one non-FIFA nationality.

No.	Pos.	Nation	Player

Out: Note: Flags indicate national team as defined under FIFA eligibility rules; some limited exceptions apply. Players may hold more than one non-FIFA nationality.

No.	Pos.	Nation	Player

==== MFK Mykolaiv ====
In: Note: Flags indicate national team as defined under FIFA eligibility rules; some limited exceptions apply. Players may hold more than one non-FIFA nationality.

No.	Pos.	Nation	Player

Out: Note: Flags indicate national team as defined under FIFA eligibility rules; some limited exceptions apply. Players may hold more than one non-FIFA nationality.

No.	Pos.	Nation	Player

==== FC Nafkom Brovary ====
In: Note: Flags indicate national team as defined under FIFA eligibility rules; some limited exceptions apply. Players may hold more than one non-FIFA nationality.

No.	Pos.	Nation	Player

Out: Note: Flags indicate national team as defined under FIFA eligibility rules; some limited exceptions apply. Players may hold more than one non-FIFA nationality.

No.	Pos.	Nation	Player

==== FC Nyva Ternopil ====
In: Note: Flags indicate national team as defined under FIFA eligibility rules; some limited exceptions apply. Players may hold more than one non-FIFA nationality.

No.	Pos.	Nation	Player

Out: Note: Flags indicate national team as defined under FIFA eligibility rules; some limited exceptions apply. Players may hold more than one non-FIFA nationality.

No.	Pos.	Nation	Player
—	FW	UKR	Dmytro Suspitsyn (Free Agent)
—	MF	UKR	Taras Duraj (to Kryvbas)

==== PFC Nyva Vinnytsia ====
In: Note: Flags indicate national team as defined under FIFA eligibility rules; some limited exceptions apply. Players may hold more than one non-FIFA nationality.

No.	Pos.	Nation	Player

Out: Note: Flags indicate national team as defined under FIFA eligibility rules; some limited exceptions apply. Players may hold more than one non-FIFA nationality.

No.	Pos.	Nation	Player

==== FC Obolon-2 Kyiv ====
In: Note: Flags indicate national team as defined under FIFA eligibility rules; some limited exceptions apply. Players may hold more than one non-FIFA nationality.

No.	Pos.	Nation	Player

Out: Note: Flags indicate national team as defined under FIFA eligibility rules; some limited exceptions apply. Players may hold more than one non-FIFA nationality.

No.	Pos.	Nation	Player

==== FC Podillya-Khmelnytskyi ====
In: Note: Flags indicate national team as defined under FIFA eligibility rules; some limited exceptions apply. Players may hold more than one non-FIFA nationality.

No.	Pos.	Nation	Player

Out: Note: Flags indicate national team as defined under FIFA eligibility rules; some limited exceptions apply. Players may hold more than one non-FIFA nationality.

No.	Pos.	Nation	Player

==== FC Ros' Bila Tserkva ====
In: Note: Flags indicate national team as defined under FIFA eligibility rules; some limited exceptions apply. Players may hold more than one non-FIFA nationality.

No.	Pos.	Nation	Player

Out: Note: Flags indicate national team as defined under FIFA eligibility rules; some limited exceptions apply. Players may hold more than one non-FIFA nationality.

No.	Pos.	Nation	Player

==== FC Veres Rivne ====
In: Note: Flags indicate national team as defined under FIFA eligibility rules; some limited exceptions apply. Players may hold more than one non-FIFA nationality.

No.	Pos.	Nation	Player

Out: Note: Flags indicate national team as defined under FIFA eligibility rules; some limited exceptions apply. Players may hold more than one non-FIFA nationality.

No.	Pos.	Nation	Player

==== FC Yednist' Plysky ====
In: Note: Flags indicate national team as defined under FIFA eligibility rules; some limited exceptions apply. Players may hold more than one non-FIFA nationality.

No.	Pos.	Nation	Player

Out: Note: Flags indicate national team as defined under FIFA eligibility rules; some limited exceptions apply. Players may hold more than one non-FIFA nationality.

No.	Pos.	Nation	Player

=== Druha B ===
==== FC Arsenal Kharkiv ====
In: Note: Flags indicate national team as defined under FIFA eligibility rules; some limited exceptions apply. Players may hold more than one non-FIFA nationality.

No.	Pos.	Nation	Player

Out: Note: Flags indicate national team as defined under FIFA eligibility rules; some limited exceptions apply. Players may hold more than one non-FIFA nationality.

No.	Pos.	Nation	Player

==== FC Dnipro-75 Dnipropetrovsk ====
In: Note: Flags indicate national team as defined under FIFA eligibility rules; some limited exceptions apply. Players may hold more than one non-FIFA nationality.

No.	Pos.	Nation	Player

Out: Note: Flags indicate national team as defined under FIFA eligibility rules; some limited exceptions apply. Players may hold more than one non-FIFA nationality.

No.	Pos.	Nation	Player

==== FC Hirnik Kryvyi Rih ====
In: Note: Flags indicate national team as defined under FIFA eligibility rules; some limited exceptions apply. Players may hold more than one non-FIFA nationality.

No.	Pos.	Nation	Player

Out: Note: Flags indicate national team as defined under FIFA eligibility rules; some limited exceptions apply. Players may hold more than one non-FIFA nationality.

No.	Pos.	Nation	Player

==== FC Hirnyk-Sport Komsomolsk ====
In: Note: Flags indicate national team as defined under FIFA eligibility rules; some limited exceptions apply. Players may hold more than one non-FIFA nationality.

No.	Pos.	Nation	Player

Out: Note: Flags indicate national team as defined under FIFA eligibility rules; some limited exceptions apply. Players may hold more than one non-FIFA nationality.

No.	Pos.	Nation	Player

==== FC Illichivets-2 Mariupol ====
In: Note: Flags indicate national team as defined under FIFA eligibility rules; some limited exceptions apply. Players may hold more than one non-FIFA nationality.

No.	Pos.	Nation	Player

Out: Note: Flags indicate national team as defined under FIFA eligibility rules; some limited exceptions apply. Players may hold more than one non-FIFA nationality.

No.	Pos.	Nation	Player

==== FC Kremin Kremenchuk ====
In: Note: Flags indicate national team as defined under FIFA eligibility rules; some limited exceptions apply. Players may hold more than one non-FIFA nationality.

No.	Pos.	Nation	Player
10	MF	UKR	Vitaliy Sobko (from Helios)

Out: Note: Flags indicate national team as defined under FIFA eligibility rules; some limited exceptions apply. Players may hold more than one non-FIFA nationality.

No.	Pos.	Nation	Player
9	FW	UKR	Roman Bezus (to Vorskla)
19	FW	UKR	Roman Kunev (to Vorskla)

==== FC Metalurh-2 Zaporizhya ====
In: Note: Flags indicate national team as defined under FIFA eligibility rules; some limited exceptions apply. Players may hold more than one non-FIFA nationality.

No.	Pos.	Nation	Player

Out: Note: Flags indicate national team as defined under FIFA eligibility rules; some limited exceptions apply. Players may hold more than one non-FIFA nationality.

No.	Pos.	Nation	Player

==== FC Olkom Melitopol ====
In: Note: Flags indicate national team as defined under FIFA eligibility rules; some limited exceptions apply. Players may hold more than one non-FIFA nationality.

No.	Pos.	Nation	Player

Out: Note: Flags indicate national team as defined under FIFA eligibility rules; some limited exceptions apply. Players may hold more than one non-FIFA nationality.

No.	Pos.	Nation	Player

==== FC Olimpik Donetsk ====
In: Note: Flags indicate national team as defined under FIFA eligibility rules; some limited exceptions apply. Players may hold more than one non-FIFA nationality.

No.	Pos.	Nation	Player

Out: Note: Flags indicate national team as defined under FIFA eligibility rules; some limited exceptions apply. Players may hold more than one non-FIFA nationality.

No.	Pos.	Nation	Player

==== FC Poltava ====
In: Note: Flags indicate national team as defined under FIFA eligibility rules; some limited exceptions apply. Players may hold more than one non-FIFA nationality.

No.	Pos.	Nation	Player

Out: Note: Flags indicate national team as defined under FIFA eligibility rules; some limited exceptions apply. Players may hold more than one non-FIFA nationality.

No.	Pos.	Nation	Player

==== PFC Sevastopol-2 ====
In: Note: Flags indicate national team as defined under FIFA eligibility rules; some limited exceptions apply. Players may hold more than one non-FIFA nationality.

No.	Pos.	Nation	Player

Out: Note: Flags indicate national team as defined under FIFA eligibility rules; some limited exceptions apply. Players may hold more than one non-FIFA nationality.

No.	Pos.	Nation	Player

==== FC Shakhtar Sverdlovsk ====
In: Note: Flags indicate national team as defined under FIFA eligibility rules; some limited exceptions apply. Players may hold more than one non-FIFA nationality.

No.	Pos.	Nation	Player

Out: Note: Flags indicate national team as defined under FIFA eligibility rules; some limited exceptions apply. Players may hold more than one non-FIFA nationality.

No.	Pos.	Nation	Player

==== FC Shakhtar-3 Donetsk ====
In: Note: Flags indicate national team as defined under FIFA eligibility rules; some limited exceptions apply. Players may hold more than one non-FIFA nationality.

No.	Pos.	Nation	Player

Out: Note: Flags indicate national team as defined under FIFA eligibility rules; some limited exceptions apply. Players may hold more than one non-FIFA nationality.

No.	Pos.	Nation	Player

==== FC Stal Dniprodzerzhynsk ====
In: Note: Flags indicate national team as defined under FIFA eligibility rules; some limited exceptions apply. Players may hold more than one non-FIFA nationality.

No.	Pos.	Nation	Player

Out: Note: Flags indicate national team as defined under FIFA eligibility rules; some limited exceptions apply. Players may hold more than one non-FIFA nationality.

No.	Pos.	Nation	Player

==== FC Titan Armyansk ====
In: Note: Flags indicate national team as defined under FIFA eligibility rules; some limited exceptions apply. Players may hold more than one non-FIFA nationality.

No.	Pos.	Nation	Player

Out: Note: Flags indicate national team as defined under FIFA eligibility rules; some limited exceptions apply. Players may hold more than one non-FIFA nationality.

No.	Pos.	Nation	Player

==== FC Titan Donetsk ====
In: Note: Flags indicate national team as defined under FIFA eligibility rules; some limited exceptions apply. Players may hold more than one non-FIFA nationality.

No.	Pos.	Nation	Player

Out: Note: Flags indicate national team as defined under FIFA eligibility rules; some limited exceptions apply. Players may hold more than one non-FIFA nationality.

No.	Pos.	Nation	Player

==== FC Sumy ====
In: Note: Flags indicate national team as defined under FIFA eligibility rules; some limited exceptions apply. Players may hold more than one non-FIFA nationality.

No.	Pos.	Nation	Player

Out: Note: Flags indicate national team as defined under FIFA eligibility rules; some limited exceptions apply. Players may hold more than one non-FIFA nationality.

No.	Pos.	Nation	Player

==== FC Zirka Kirovohrad ====
In: Note: Flags indicate national team as defined under FIFA eligibility rules; some limited exceptions apply. Players may hold more than one non-FIFA nationality.

No.	Pos.	Nation	Player

Out: Note: Flags indicate national team as defined under FIFA eligibility rules; some limited exceptions apply. Players may hold more than one non-FIFA nationality.

No.	Pos.	Nation	Player

== See also ==
- Ukrainian Premier League 2008-09
- Ukrainian First League 2008-09
- Ukrainian Second League 2008-09
- List of Ukrainian football transfers summer 2009
