= 2008–09 Ukrainian Cup =

Kubok Ukrainy

Tournament details
- Country: Ukraine
- Dates: 8 July 2008 – 31 May 2009; 8 July – 6 August 2008 (qualification rounds); 12 September 2008 – 31 May 2009 (main event)
- Teams: 62

Final positions
- Champions: Vorskla Poltava (1st title)
- Runners-up: Shakhtar Donetsk
- Semifinalists: Metalist Kharkiv; Dynamo Kyiv

Tournament statistics
- Matches played: 60
- Goals scored: 184 (3.07 per match)
- Top goal scorer: (Ukraine) Andriy Yarmolenko (5)

The 2008–09 Ukrainian Cup was the 18th annual season of Ukraine's football knockout competition. The defending champion of this edition was Shakhtar Donetsk.

The Ukrainian Cup began with a preliminary round where teams from Druha Liha and Amateur Cup champions participated. In the second preliminary round, teams from Persha Liha were drawn into the competition and then in the round of 32 teams from Premier League entered the competition.

The winners of this competition entered as Ukraine's cup winner representative in the play-off round of the 2009–10 UEFA Europa League. Since one of the finalists, Shakhtar Donetsk, had already qualified for European competitions for 2009–10 by virtue of their position in the Premier League, Vorskla Poltava automatically qualifies for the 2009–10 UEFA Europa League.

== Team allocation ==
Sixty-two teams participated in the competition.

=== Distribution ===
	Teams entering in this round	Teams advancing from previous round
First qualifying round (26 teams)	25 participants of the Second League (lower seeded); 1 participant of the Amateur Cup winner (Yednist-2 Plysky)	
Second qualifying round (32 teams)	17 participants of the First League; 2 participants of the Second League (higher seeded)	13 winners from the first qualifying round
Tournament proper (32 teams)	16 participants of the Premier League	16 winners from the second qualifying round

=== Round and draw dates ===
All draws held at FFU headquarters (Building of Football) in Kyiv unless stated otherwise.

Phase	Round	Draw date	Game date
Qualifying	First qualifying round	8 July 2008	16 July 2008
Qualifying	Second qualifying round	22 July 2008	4,6 August 2008
Main event	Round of 32	15 August 2008	12–14 September 2008
Main event	Round of 16	24 September 2008	28–29 October 2008
Main event	Quarter-finals	31 October 2008	11–12 November 2008
Main event	Semi-finals	19 November 2008	22 April – 13 May 2009
Main event	Final	31 May 2009 at Dnipro Arena, Dnipropetrovsk	

=== Teams ===
Enter in First Round			Enter in Second Round		Enter in Round of 32
AAFU; 1 team	PFL League 2; 25/35 teams		PFL League 2; 2/35 teams	PFL League 1; 17/18 teams	UPL; 16/16 teams
Yednist-2 Plysky	Group A: Arsenal Bila Tserkva; Bastion Illichivsk*; Bukovyna Chernivtsi; FC Korosten; Nafkom Brovary; Nyva Ternopil; Nyva Vinnytsia; Podillya Khmelnytskyi; Ros Bila Tserkva; Veres Rivne; Yednist Plysky	Group B: Arsenal Kharkiv; Dnipro-75 Dnipropetrovsk*; Hirnyk Kryvyi Rih; Hirnyk-Sport Komsomolsk; Kremin Kremenchuk; Olimpik Donetsk; Olkom Melitopol; FC Poltava; Shakhtar Sverdlovsk; Stal Dniprodzerzhynsk; Tytan Armyansk; Tytan Donetsk; Yavir Krasnopillia; Zirka Kirovohrad	CSKA Kyiv; Dnipro Cherkasy	Desna Chernihiv; Enerhetyk Burshtyn; Feniks-Illichovets Kalinino; Helios Kharkiv; Ihroservice Simferopol; Knyazha Schaslyve; Komunalnyk Luhansk; Krymteplytsia Molodizhne; Naftovyk-Ukrnafta; Obolon Kyiv; Dnister Ovidiopol; FC Oleksandriya; Prykarpattya Ivano-Frankivsk; FC Sevastopol; Stal Alchevsk; Volyn Lutsk; Zakarpattia Uzhhorod	Arsenal Kyiv; Chornomorets Odesa; Dnipro Dnipropetrovsk; Dynamo Kyiv; Illichivets Mariupol; Karpaty Lviv; FC Kharkiv; Kryvbas Kryvyi Rih; FC Lviv; Metalist Kharkiv; Metalurh Donetsk; Metalurh Zaporizhia; Shakhtar Donetsk; Tavriya Simferopol; Vorskla Poltava; Zorya Luhansk

Notes:

- With the asterisk (*) are noted the Second League teams that were recently admitted to the league from amateurs and the AAFU (amateur) team(s) that qualified in place of the Amateur Cup finalist(s).
- Reserve teams from the Second League: Illichivets-2, Karpaty-2, Knyazha-2, Metalurh-2 (Zaporizhia), Obolon-2, Sevastopol-2, Shakhtar-3; and Dynamo-2 from the First League were not included in the draw.
- MFC Mykolaiv, a member of the Second League, was not participating.

== Competition schedule ==
=== First Preliminary Round ===
In this round entered 25 teams from Druha Liha and winners of the Ukrainian Amateur Cup. The draw for the First Preliminary Round was held on July 8, 2008 while the matches took place on July 16, 2008.

Veres Rivne (2L)	0–1	(2L) FC Korosten
Yednist-2 Plysky (AM)^{1}	3–0	(2L) Hirnyk-Sport Komsomolsk
Arsenal Bila Tserkva (2L)	3–1^{2}	(2L) Shakhtar Sverdlovsk
FC Poltava (2L)	4–1	(2L) Arsenal Kharkiv
Kremin Kremenchuk (2L)	w/o^{3}	(2L) Bukovyna Chernivtsi
Podillya-Khmelnytskyi (2L)	4–0	(2L) Nafkom Brovary
Olkom Melitopol (2L)	2–0	(2L) Dnipro-75 Dnipropetrovsk
Titan Donetsk (2L)	0–1	(2L) Yednist Plysky
Nyva Vinnytsia (2L)	3–1 aet	(2L) Titan Armyansk
Stal Dniprodzerzhynsk (2L)	2–0	(2L) Nyva Ternopil
Ros' Bila Tserkva (2L)	1–3^{4}	(2L) Bastion Illichivsk
Zirka Kirovohrad (2L)	1–0	(2L) Yavir Krasnopilya
Olimpik Donetsk (2L)	4–1	(2L) Hirnik Kryvyi Rih

Notes

- ^1 Qualify as Amateur Cup Champions of Ukraine 2007
- ^2 The match was played in Obukhiv, Kyiv Oblast
- ^3 Since Bukovyna did not arrive for their game, Kremin advanced to the next round
- ^4 The match was played in Borodianka because Bila Tserkva's home ground Trudovi Reserve was under reconstruction

=== Second Preliminary Round ===
In this round entered all 18 teams from Persha Liha. They were drawn against the 14 winners of the First Preliminary Round, with two matches containing only Persha Liha teams. The draw was held on July 22, 2008, while the matches were played on August 6, 2008, unless otherwise noted.

Olimpik Donetsk (2L)	0–4^{5}	(2L) Zirka Kirovohrad
FC Korosten (2L)	1–3	(1L) Knyazha Schaslyve
Yednist-2 Plysky (AM)	2–4	(1L) Dnister Ovidiopol
Arsenal Bila Tserkva (2L)	1–3	(1L) Desna Chernihiv
CSCA Kyiv (2L)	2–1 aet	(2L) FC Poltava
Kremin Kremenchuk (2L)	1–1 aet, p. 2–4	(1L) Komunalnyk Luhansk
Podillya-Khmelnytskyi (2L)	1–2 aet	(1L) Helios Kharkiv
Olkom Melitopol (2L)	4–0	(2L) Yednist Plysky
PFC Sevastopol (1L)	1–2 aet	(1L) Feniks-Illichovets Kalinine
Bastion Illichivsk (2L)	2–3 aet	(2L) Nyva Vinnytsia
Stal Dniprodzerzhynsk (2L)	0–2	(1L) PFC Oleksandriya
Obolon Kyiv (1L)	3–1	(1L) Naftovyk-Ukrnafta Okhtyrka
Dnipro Cherkasy (2L)	2–3 aet	(1L) Stal Alchevsk
Zakarpattia Uzhhorod (1L)	4–2^{6}	(1L) Volyn Lutsk
Enerhetyk Burshtyn (1L)	0–1	(1L) Ihroservice Simferopol
Prykarpattya Ivano-Frankivsk (1L)	0–3	(1L) Krymteplitsia Molodizhne

Notes

- ^5 The match was played on August 4, 2008
- ^6 The match was played in Mukachevo

=== Bracket ===
Round of 32
Illichivets Mariupol	0
Shakhtar Donetsk	3
Helios Kharkiv	0
Zakarpattia Uzhhorod	1
Oleksandriya	1
Karpaty Lviv	0
Krymteplitsia Molodizhne	1
Dnipro Dnipropetrovsk (a.e.t.)	3
Olkom Melitopol	0
Dynamo Kyiv	5
Ihroservice Simferopol	0
Zorya Luhansk	2
Nyva Vinnytsia	1
Stal Alchevsk	4
Knyazha Schaslyve	0
Lviv	2
CSKA Kyiv	0
Tavriya Simferopol	3
Feniks-Illichovets	2
Kryvbas Kryvyi Rih	1
Dnister Ovidiopol	1
Metalist Kharkiv	4
Komunalnyk Luhansk	0
Arsenal Kyiv	3
Zirka Kirovohrad	0
Vorskla Poltava	1
Obolon Kyiv (a.e.t.)	1
Chornomorets Odesa	0
Metalurh Zaporizhya	2
Metalurh Donetsk	3
Desna Chernihiv	1
Kharkiv	4

Round of 16
Zakarpattia Uzhhorod	1
Shakhtar Donetsk	4
Oleksandriya (p)	1 (6)
Dnipro Dnipropetrovsk	1 (5)
Dynamo Kyiv	2
Zorya Luhansk	0
Stal Alchevsk	2
Lviv	0
Feniks-Illichovets	0
Tavriya Simferopol	2
Metalist Kharkiv	3
Arsenal Kyiv	1
Obolon Kyiv	1
Vorskla Poltava	4
Kharkiv	0
Metalurh Donetsk	2

Quarter-finals
Oleksandriya	1
Shakhtar Donetsk	2
Stal Alchevsk	1
Dynamo Kyiv	4
Tavriya Simferopol	1
Metalist Kharkiv	2
Metalurh Donetsk	0
Vorskla Poltava	1

Semi-finals
Shakhtar Donetsk	1
Dynamo Kyiv	0
Metalist Kharkiv	0, 0
Vorskla Poltava	0, 2

Final
Vorskla Poltava	1
Shakhtar Donetsk	0

=== Round of 32 ===
In this round entered all 16 teams from Premier League. They were drawn against the 16 winners from the previous round, who played home in this round. The draw was held on August 15, 2008, while the matches were played on September 13, 2008, unless otherwise noted.

12 September 2008
17:00 LST

Illichivets Mariupol (PL)	0–3	(PL) Shakhtar Donetsk
	Report	Jádson 40'; Ilsinho 69'; Luiz Adriano 81'

Illichivets Stadium, Mariupol
Attendance: 8,500
Referee: Oleksandr Shamych

13 September 2008
14:00 LST

Feniks-Illichovets Kalinine (1L)	2–1	(PL) Kryvbas Kryvyi Rih
Patula 31'; Prokopchenko 79'	Report	Hrytsuk 75'

Yunist Stadium, Kalinine
Attendance: 1,200
Referee: Hennadiy Litvinov

13 September 2008
15:30 LST

Helios Kharkiv (1L)	0–1	(1L) Zakarpattia Uzhhorod
	Report	Yarosh 47' (pen.)

Hazovyk Stadium, Krasnokutsk (Kharkiv)
Attendance: 1,000
Referee: Oleksandr Yakymenko

13 September 2008
16:00 LST

Komunalnyk Luhansk (1L)	0–3	(PL) Arsenal Kyiv
	Report	Lysenko 28'; Benio 44'; Mandziuk 89'

Avanhard Stadium, Luhansk
Attendance: 2,500
Referee: Viktor Suslo

13 September 2008
17:30 LST

Zirka Kirovohrad (2L)	0–1	(PL) Vorskla Poltava
	Report	Yarmash 43'

Zirka Stadium, Kirovohrad
Attendance: 6,100
Referee: Vasyl Olshanetsky

13 September 2008
16:00 LST

CSCA Kyiv (2L)	0–3	(PL) Tavriya Simferopol
	Report	Homeniuk 35', 45+1'; Galiuza 67'

Systema Stadium, Borodianka
Attendance: 300
Referee: Viktor Kravchenko

13 September 2008
16:00 LST

Dnister Ovidiopol (1L)	1–4	(PL) Metalist Kharkiv
Zalevskyi 83'	Report	Dević 21', 80'; Jajá 24', 30'

Dnister Stadium, Ovidiopol (Odesa)
Attendance: 1,000
Referee: Serhiy Tsymbal

13 September 2008
17:00 LST

Knyazha Schaslyve (1L)	0–2	(PL) FC Lviv
	Report	Kitsuta 60'; Khudzik 68'

Kniazha Arena Stadium, Dobromyl (Lviv Oblast)
Attendance: 900
Referee: Volodymyr Aleksandrenko

13 September 2008
17:00 LST

Olkom Melitopol (2L)	0–5	(PL) Dynamo Kyiv
Shudrik 63' (o.g.)	Report	Yarmolenko 8', 71'; Asatiani 14'; Kravets 45'

Spartak Stadium, Melitopol
Attendance: 6,800
Referee: Valeriy Davydov

13 September 2008
18:00 LST

Metalurh Zaporizhya (PL)	2–3	(PL) Metalurh Donetsk
Vernydub 5'; Alozi 16'	Report	Berezovchuk 7'; Sytnik 31'; Tymchenko 90'

Slavutych Arena, Zaporizhia
Attendance: 8,000
Referee: Ihor Bytskalo

13 September 2008
18:00 LST

Krymteplitsia Molodizhne (1L)	1 – 3 aet	(PL) Dnipro Dnipropetrovsk
Saranchukov 89' (pen.)	Report	Bielik 9', 105'; Ferreira 93' (pen.)

Krymteplytisa Stadium, Molodizhne (next Simferopol)
Attendance: 3,000
Referee: Serhiy Vozniak

13 September 2008
20:00 LST

Desna Chernihiv (1L)	1–4	(PL) FC Kharkiv
Kucherenko 69'	Report	Ribeiro 24'; Platon 66'; Batista 67'; Boychenko 83'

Gagarin Stadium, Chernihiv
Attendance: 3,500
Referee: Andriy Valenko

14 September 2008
16:00 LST

PFC Oleksandriya (1L)	1–0	(PL) Karpaty Lviv
Shupik 39'	Report

Nika Stadium, Oleksandriya
Attendance: 2,500
Referee: Anatoliy Svystun

14 September 2008
16:00 LST

Obolon Kyiv (1L)	1 – 0 aet	(PL) Chornomorets Odesa
Klymenko 114'	Report	Shandruk (red card) 113'

Obolon Stadium, Kyiv
Attendance: 1,200
Referee: Vitaliy Demyanenko

14 September 2008
16:00 LST

Ihroservice Simferopol (1L)	0–2	(PL) Zorya Luhansk
	Report	Godoi 81'; Kameniuka 90'

Fiolent Stadium, Simferopol
Attendance: 1,500
Referee: Yevhen Khalamendyk

14 September 2008
16:00 LST

Nyva Vinnytsia (2L)	1–4	(1L) Stal Alchevsk
Paskiv 76'	Report	Akymenko 33', 40'; Mishchenko 59'; Shavrin 79'

Municipal Central Stadium (MCS), Vinnytsia
Attendance: 6,500
Referee: Leonid Yarmolynsky

=== Round of 16 ===
In this round entered winners from the previous round (11 Premier League and 5 Persha Liha teams). The draw was random and was held on September 24, 2008. The matches were played on October 29, 2008, unless otherwise noted.

28 October 2008
14:00 LST

Obolon Kyiv (1L)	1–4	(PL) Vorskla Poltava
Onysko 14'; Karmalita (red card) 24'; Lozinsky 78' (o.g.)	Report	Kulakov 18'; Kravchenko 81'; Sachko 90+2'

Obolon Stadium, Kyiv
Attendance: 1,000
Referee: Mykhailo Rodionenko

29 October 2008
14:00 LST

Zakarpattia Uzhhorod (1L)	1–4	(PL) Shakhtar Donetsk
Kostiuk 71'	Report	Selezniov 14'; Willian 48'; Moreno 63'; Raț 87' (pen.)

Avanhard Stadium, Uzhhorod
Attendance: 8,000
Referee: Orest Shmyhelsky

29 October 2008
12:00 LST

Feniks-Illichovets Kalinine (1L)	0–2	(PL) Tavriya Simferopol
	Report	Zborovsky 51'; Homeniuk 75'

Yunist Stadium, Kalinine (Crimea)
Attendance: 1,500
Referee: Yevhen Abrosymov

29 October 2008
17:00 LST

Stal Alchevsk (1L)	2–0	(PL) FC Lviv
Nazarenko 28'; Havrysh 88'	Report

Stal Stadium, Alchevsk
Attendance: 3,500
Referee: Oleksandr Derdo

29 October 2008
17:00 LST

PFC Oleksandriya (1L)	1 – 1 aet p. 6–5^{7}	(PL) Dnipro Dnipropetrovsk
Postolatyev 38'	Report	Karnoza 4'

Nika Stadium, Oleksandria
Attendance: 5,000
Referee: Serhiy Boyko

29 October 2008
18:00 LST

FC Kharkiv (PL)	0–2	(PL) Metalurh Donetsk
	Report	Fabinho 22'; Kingsley 62'

Yuvileyny Stadium, Sumy
Attendance: 2,200
Referee: Serhiy Shebek

29 October 2008
19:00 LST

Dynamo Kyiv (PL)	2–0	(PL) Zorya Luhansk
Yarmolenko 16'; Sablić 21'	Report	Korotetsky (yellow card) 77' (red card) 82'

Dynamo Stadium, Kyiv
Attendance: 4,500
Referee: Anatoliy Abdula

29 October 2008
19:00 LST

Metalist Kharkiv (PL)	3–1	(PL) Arsenal Kyiv
Koval 6'; Obradović 28' (pen.); Zézé 90+3'	Report	Starhorodsky 69' (pen.)

Metalist Stadium, Kharkiv
Attendance: 9,500
Referee: Andriy Shandor

Notes:

- ^7 Penalty missed for Oleksandria – Andriy Hitchenko, for Dnipro – Vitaliy Denisov and Andriy Vorobey.

=== Quarterfinals ===
The draw was held on October 31, 2008, and was random. The matches were played November 12, 2008.

11 November 2008
17:00 LST

PFC Oleksandriya (1L)	1–2	(PL) Shakhtar Donetsk
Kazaniuk 41'	Report	Selezniov 34' (pen.); Hladkyy 90+2'

Nika Stadium, Oleksandria
Attendance: 6,000
Referee: Oleh Derevinsky

12 November 2008
17:00 LST

Stal Alchevsk (1L)	1–4	(PL) Dynamo Kyiv
Nazarenko (red card) 63'	Report	Cernat 14', 28'; Yarmolenko 36', 90+2'; Sablić 56' (o.g.)

Stal Stadium, Alchevsk
Attendance: 7,000
Referee: Andriy Shandor

12 November 2008
17:00 LST

Tavriya Simferopol (PL)	1–2	(PL) Metalist Kharkiv
Kovpak 85'	Report	Zézé 55'; Trišović 80'

Lokomotyv Stadium, Simferopol
Attendance: 5,100
Referee: Yevhen Herenda

12 November 2008
18:00 LST

Metalurh Donetsk (PL)	0–1	(PL) Vorskla Poltava
	Report	Kravchenko 2'

Metalurh Stadium, Donetsk
Attendance: 1,500
Referee: Serhiy Zadiran

=== Semifinals ===
The draw was held on November 19, 2008, and was random. The games were scheduled to be played on April 22, 2009.

22 April 2009
18:00 LST

Metalist Kharkiv (PL)	0–0	(PL) Vorskla Poltava
	Report

Metalist Stadium, Kharkiv
Attendance: 17,000
Referee: Oleh Derevinsky

REPLAY 13 May 2009
18:00 LST

Vorskla Poltava (PL)	2–0	(PL) Metalist Kharkiv
Sachko 12', 31'	Report

Vorskla Stadium, Poltava
Attendance: 15,000
Referee: Ihor Ishchenko

13 May 2009
19:45 LST

Shakhtar Donetsk (PL)	1–0	(PL) Dynamo Kyiv
Lewandowski 83'	Report

Olimpiysky Stadium, Donetsk
Attendance: 23,000
Referee: Yuriy Mozharovsky

=== Final ===
The Ukrainian Cup Final was played in Dnipro Stadium, Dnipropetrovsk on May 31, 2009.

31 May 2009
17:00 LST

Vorskla Poltava (PL)	1–0	(PL) Shakhtar Donetsk
Sachko 50'	Report	Fernandinho (red card) 57'

Dnipro Arena, Dnipropetrovsk
Attendance: 25,700
Referee: Vitaliy Hodulian

== Top goalscorers ==
Status on June 1, 2009

Scorer	Goals	Team
(Ukraine) Andriy Yarmolenko	5	Dynamo Kyiv
(Ukraine) Vasyl Sachko	4	Vorskla Poltava
(Ukraine) Oleksandr Akymenko	3	Stal Alchevsk
(Ukraine) Ruslan Yarosh	3	Zakarpattia Uzhhorod
(Ukraine) Kostiantyn Dudchenko	3	OLKOM/Dynamo
(Ukraine) Volodymyr Homenyuk	3	Tavriya/Dnipro

In bold are the players that are still in the competition. Statistics can be found at RSSSF web-site.

== See also ==
- 2008–09 Ukrainian Premier League
