= 2012–13 FC Arsenal Kyiv season =

Arsenal Kyiv
2012–13 season
- Chairman: Vadim Rabinovich
- Manager: Leonid Kuchuk
- Stadium: Lobanovskyi Stadium
- Premier League: 5th
- Ukrainian Cup: Round of 16
- UEFA Europa League: Third qualifying round
- Top goalscorer: League: Maksim Shatskikh (4); All: Volodymyr Homenyuk (6)

The 2012–13 FC Arsenal Kyiv season was the club's 18th Ukrainian Premier League season and second season under manager Leonid Kuchuk. During the season, Arsenal Kyiv competed in the Premier League, UEFA Europa League and Ukrainian Cup.

== Squad ==
As of 18 August 2012

Note: Flags indicate national team as defined under FIFA eligibility rules; some limited exceptions apply. Players may hold more than one non-FIFA nationality.

No.	Pos.	Nation	Player
2	DF	FIN	Veli Lampi
4	DF	UKR	Serhiy Symonenko
6	DF	BRA	Rafael Santos
7	FW	ROU	Ionuț Mazilu
8	MF	UKR	Oleksandr Maksymov
9	FW	UKR	Oleksandr Kovpak
10	MF	ROU	George Florescu
11	MF	UKR	Artem Starhorodskyi
12	GK	UKR	Yevhen Borovyk
13	MF	LTU	Saulius Mikoliūnas
14	DF	CMR	Éric Matoukou (on loan from Dnipro)
15	DF	MNE	Janko Simović (on loan from Dynamo Kyiv)
16	FW	UZB	Maksim Shatskikh (captain)

No.	Pos.	Nation	Player
17	DF	UKR	Andriy Hitchenko
18	MF	GHA	Abeiku Quansah
19	MF	GEO	Alexander Kobakhidze (on loan from Dnipro)
20	FW	GHA	Dominic Adiyiah
22	FW	UKR	Volodymyr Homenyuk
25	MF	POR	Pelé (on loan from Milan)
28	DF	UKR	Volodymyr Polyovyi
31	MF	BRA	Leandro
33	DF	UKR	Andriy Khomyn
52	MF	UKR	Yevhen Shakhov (on loan from Dnipro)
77	GK	UKR	Yuriy Pankiv
78	MF	UKR	Serhiy Valyayev

=== Out on loan ===
Note: Flags indicate national team as defined under FIFA eligibility rules; some limited exceptions apply. Players may hold more than one non-FIFA nationality.

No.	Pos.	Nation	Player
—	DF	UKR	Bohdan Shershun (on loan to Kryvbas)
—	DF	NGR	Michael Odibe (on loan to Dnipro)

No.	Pos.	Nation	Player
—	MF	UKR	Olavale Fabunmi (on loan to Slavutych)
—	MF	UKR	Volodymyr Arzhanov (on loan to Volyn)

== Competitions ==
=== 2012-13 Ukrainian Premier League ===
==== Results summary ====
Overall								Home						Away					
Pld	W	D	L	GF	GA	GD	Pts	W	D	L	GF	GA	GD	W	D	L	GF	GA	GD
30	10	9	11	34	41	−7	39	6	4	5	20	14	+6	4	5	6	14	27	−13

Last updated: 26 May 2013.
Source: Soccerway

==== Results by round ====
Round	1	2	3	4	5	6	7	8	9	10	11	12	13	14	15	16	17	18	19	20	21	22	23	24	25	26	27	28	29	30
Ground	A	H	A	H	A	H	A	H	A	A	H	A	H	A	H	H	A	H	A	H	A	H	A	H	H	A	H	A	H	A
Result	L	L	W	D	W	W	D	W	L	D	W	D	D	L	L	W	L	L	L	L	L	D	D	L	W	W	D	W	W	D
Position	16	16	12	11	8	7	6	5	6	5	5	8	8	8	8	8	8	8	12	12	13	12	12	12	9	9	9	9	9	8

Source: Soccerway
A = Away; H = Home; W = Win; D = Draw; L = Loss

==== Results ====
15 July 2012 Match 1	Shakhtar	6–0	Arsenal	Donetsk
19:00	Mkhitaryan 13', 31'; Seleznyov 34'; Teixeira 39'; Ilsinho 66'; Dević 90+4'	Summary		Stadium: Donbass Arena; Attendance: 39,263; Referee: Yuri Mozharovskyi

22 July 2012 Match 2	Arsenal	0–1	Dynamo	Kyiv
19:30	Stargorodsky (yellow card) 77' (yellow-red card) 78'	Summary	Ideye 3'	Stadium: Dynamo Stadium; Attendance: 11,617; Referee: Anatoliy Zhabchenko

29 July 2012 Match 3	Zorya	1–3	Arsenal	Luhansk
21:00	Galyuza 24'	Summary	Shatskikh 10', 14' (pen.); Homenyuk 21'	Stadium: Avanhard Stadium; Attendance: 12,000; Referee: Andriy Kuz'min

5 August 2012 Match 4	Arsenal	1–1	Dnipro	Kyiv
19:30	Kobakhidze 90+2'	Summary	Matheus 65' (pen.)	Stadium: Valeriy Lobanovskyi; Attendance: 3,920; Referee: Yaroslav Kozyk

12 August 2012 Match 5	Metalist	0–1	Arsenal	Kharkiv
21:00		Summary	Kovpak 11'	Stadium: Metalist Stadium; Attendance: 28,862; Referee: Oleksandr Derdo

17 August 2012 Match 6	Arsenal	2–1	Illichivets	Kyiv
19:00	Shatskikh 11'; Homenyuk 87'	Summary	Okriashvili 27'	Stadium: Valeriy Lobanovskyi; Attendance: 1,230; Referee: Yuri Moseichuk

26 August 2012 Match 7	Tavriya	1–1	Arsenal	Simferopol
21:00	Kalynychenko 23'	Summary	Mikoliūnas 61'	Stadium: RSC Lokomotiv; Attendance: 4,200; Referee: Yuri Mozharovskyi

2 September 2012 Match 8	Arsenal	3–0	Metalurh Zaporizhya	Kyiv
19:30	Kovpak 24'; Adiyiah 64'; Shatskikh 85'	Summary		Stadium: Valeriy Lobanovskyi; Attendance: 1,640; Referee: Kostiantyn Trukhanov

16 September 2012 Match 9	Metalurh Donetsk	5–0	Arsenal	Donetsk
16:30	Moraes 25' (pen.), 88'; Ghazaryan 61'; Traoré 75', 90+2'	Summary	Shakhov (yellow card) 23' (yellow-red card) 34'; Florescu (red card) 38'	Stadium: Metalurh Stadium; Attendance: 3,300; Referee: Andriy Kuz'min

28 September 2012 Match 10	Karpaty	1–1	Arsenal	Lviv
19:30	Balažic 49'	Summary	Adiyiah 28'	Stadium: Ukraina Stadium; Attendance: 11,100; Referee: Viktor Shvetsov

6 October 2012 Match 11	Arsenal	2–0	Hoverla	Kyiv
17:30	Homenyuk 45+1'; Kovpak 68'	Summary		Stadium: Valeriy Lobanovskyi; Attendance: 1,728; Referee: Yuri Mozharovskyi

21 October 2012 Match 12	Kryvbas	1–1	Arsenal	Kryvyi Rih
15:30	Jeslínek (yellow card) 65'; Antonov 86' (pen.)	Summary	Adiyiah (yellow card) 19'; Matoukou (yellow card) 45'; Mikoliūnas (yellow card) 63', (goal) 90'; Polyovyi (yellow card) 87'	Stadium: Metalurh Stadium; Attendance: 1,780; Referee: Oleksandr Ivanov

26 October 2012 Match 13	Arsenal	1–1	Volyn Lutsk	Valeriy Lobanovskyi
19:00	Matoukou (yellow card) 35'; Adiyiah 81'	Summary	Seun 86'	Attendance: 1,150; Referee: Yury Grisjo

4 November 2012 Match 14	Vorskla	1–0	Arsenal	Oleksiy Butovskyi Vorskla Stadium
16:00	Krasnopyorov (yellow card) 26'; Sapay (yellow card) 47'; Hromov 71'; Sklyar (yellow card) 90'	Summary	Hitchenko (yellow card) 39'; Leandro (yellow card) 56'; Polyovyi (yellow card) 85'	Attendance: 3,000; Referee: Anatoliy Abdula

11 November 2012 Match 15	Arsenal	0–1	Choromorets Odesa	Valeriy Lobanovskyi
17:30	Valyayev (yellow card) 36'; Mikoliūnas (yellow card) 39'; Florescu (yellow card) 67' (yellow-red card) 85'; Homenyuk (yellow card) 89'	Summary	Matos (yellow card) 39'; Politylo (yellow card) 40'; Bobko (yellow card) 44'; Bakaj 45'	Attendance: 1,072; Referee: Vitaliy Romanov

17 November 2012 Match 16	Arsenal	2–0	Shaktar Donetsk	Valeriy Lobanovskyi
19:30	Shatskikh 34'; Adiyiah (yellow card) 58'; Pankiv (yellow card) 82'; Shakhov (yellow card) 84'; Kobakhidze 90+3'	Summary	Rakitskiy (red card) 48'; Stepanenko (yellow card) 76'	Attendance: 3,050; Referee: Olexander Derdo

25 November 2012 Match 17	Dynamo Kyiv	4–0	Arsenal	Olimpiyskiy National Sports Complex
17:00	Khacheridi 40', (yellow card) 51'; Ideye 44', 90+1'; Husyev 88'	Summary	Starhorodskyi 67'; Matoukou (yellow card) 87'	Attendance: 20,815

2 December 2012 Match 18	Arsenal	0–1	Zorya Luhansk	Valeriy Lobanovskyi
17:30	Matoukou (yellow card) 56'; Polyovyi (yellow card) 76'; Shakhov (yellow card) 87'; Kovpak (yellow card) 88'	Summary	Chaykovskyi (yellow card) 19'; Ignjatijević (yellow card) 30'; Hrytsay (yellow card) 53', (goal) 73'	Attendance: 1,200; Referee: Victor Shvetsov

2 March 2013 Match 19	Dnipro	3–0	Arsenal	Dnipro Arena
17:30	Zozulya 19'; Matheus 50' (pen.); Douglas (yellow card) 65'; Rotan (yellow card) 66'; Fedetskiy 68'	Summary	Kyrylo Sydorenko (yellow card) 54'	Attendance: 12,801; Referee: Oleksandr Ivanov

10 March 2013 Match 20	Arsenal	1–2	Metalist Kharkiv	Valeriy Lobanovskyi
19:30	Martynyuk 7'; Kyrylo Sydorenko (yellow card) 41'; Odibe (yellow card) 65'; Ihor Brovko (yellow card) 83'; Bohdanov (yellow card) 87'	Summary	Sosa 2'; Jajá 12'; Cleiton Xavier (yellow card) 80'	Attendance: 2,520; Referee: Andriy Kuzmin

17 March 2013 Match 21	Illichivets Mariupol	2–1	Arsenal	Illichivets Stadium
13:30	Okriashvili 62' (pen.), 78'; Fomin (yellow card) 89'; Ischenko (yellow card) 90+2'	Summary	Odibe (yellow card) 30'; Romanchuk (yellow card) 58'; Sarnavskyi (red card) 58'; Arzhanov 73'; Obradović (yellow card) 89'; Santos (yellow card) 89'; Reva (yellow card) 90'	Attendance: 5,500; Referee: Vitaliy Romanov

30 March 2013 Match 22	Arsenal	1–1	Tavriya Simferopol	Valeriy Lobanovskyi
17:30	Martynyuk (yellow card) 65'; Bohdanov 82' (pen.)	Summary	Gadzhiyev (yellow card) 76', (goal) 90+2'; Humenyuk (yellow card) 85'	Attendance: 2,500; Referee: (Ukraine) Yuri Mozharovskiy

6 April 2013 23	Metalurh Zaporizhya	0–0	Arsenal Kyiv	Slavutych-Arena
16:00	Nesterov (yellow card) 27'; Sakhnevych (yellow card) 40'; Mohammed Otman (yellow card) 70'	Summary	Odibe (yellow card) 68'; Martynyuk (yellow card) 75'; Obradović (yellow card) 83'	Attendance: 4,000; Referee: (Ukraine) Oleksandr Golovkov

14 April 2013 24	Arsenal Kyiv	0–2	Metalurh Donetsk	Valeriy Lobanovskyi
19:30		Summary	Traoré 37', 51'; Makrides (yellow card) 79'	Attendance: 1,850; Referee: (Ukraine) Kostyantin Trukhanov

22 April 2013 25	Arsenal Kyiv	4–1	Karpaty Lviv	Valeriy Lobanovskyi
18:00	Arzhanov 7' (pen.), (yellow card) 44'; Adiyiah 11', (yellow card) 54'; Bohdanov 42'; Romanchuk 78'	Summary	Ozarkiv (yellow card) 7'; Khudobyak (yellow card) 30'; Harashchenkov (yellow card) 45+2'; Štilić (yellow card) 59'; Kenia 77', (yellow card) 89'	Attendance: 3,306; Referee: (Ukraine) Anatoliy Abdula

27 April 2013 26	Hoverla Uzhhorod	1–3	Arsenal Kyiv	Avanhard Stadium
13:30	Petrov 55'; Dopilka (yellow card) 56'	Summary	Homenyuk 8', (yellow card) 58'; Sharpar 40'; Tkachuk 44'	Attendance: 3,150; Referee: (Ukraine) Yury Vaks

4 May 2013 27	Arsenal Kyiv	1–1	Kryvbas Kryvyi Rih	Valeriy Lobanovskyi
17:30	Adiyiah (yellow card) 70'; Herasymyuk 75'	Summary	Samodin 11'; Lyopa (yellow card) 70'; Antonov (yellow card) 71'	Attendance: 1,970; Referee: (Ukraine) Kostyantin Trukhanov

11 May 2013 28	Volyn Lutsk	1–3	Arsenal Kyiv	Avanhard Stadium
17:30	Maslo (yellow card) 33'; Šikov (yellow card) 60'; Subotić 78'	Summary	Sharpar 20', (yellow card) 90'; Arzhanov 21', 61'; Bohdanov (yellow card) 25'; Herasymyuk (yellow card) 28'; Homenyuk (yellow card) 78'	Attendance: 2,000; Referee: (Ukraine) Oleksandr Ivanov

18 May 2013 29	Arsenal Kyiv	2–1	Vorskla Poltava	Valeriy Lobanovskyi
18:30	Bohdanov 38'; Arzhanov 62'; Herasymyuk (yellow card) 89'	Summary	Perduta (yellow card) 34'; Kryvosheyenko (yellow card) 47'; Kurylov (yellow card) 74'; Hromov 78'	Attendance: 1,899; Referee: (Ukraine) Yuriy Moseychuk

26 May 2013 30	Chornomorets Odesa	0–0	Arsenal Kyiv	Chornomorets Stadium
18:00	Matos (yellow card) 20'; Bakaj (yellow card) 70'	Summary	Herasymyuk (yellow card) 8'; Martynyuk (yellow card) 14'; Obradović (yellow card) 67'; Arzhanov (yellow card) 68'; Valyayev (yellow card) 85'	Attendance: 14,792; Referee: (Ukraine) Oleksandr Bilokur

==== League table ====
Pos	Team	Pld	W	D	L	GF	GA	GD	Pts	Qualification or relegation
6	Chornomorets Odesa	30	12	7	11	32	36	−4	43	Qualification for the Europa League second qualifying round
7	Kryvbas Kryvyi Rih (D)	30	12	7	11	36	41	−5	43	Club expelled after season (Note: Kryvbas Kryvyi Rih were denied a license for the 2013–14 season due to financial problems and were expelled.)
8	Arsenal Kyiv	30	10	9	11	34	41	−7	39	
9	Illichivets Mariupol	30	10	8	12	30	32	−2	38	
10	Zorya Luhansk	30	10	7	13	32	43	−11	37	

Source: uafootball.net.ua
Rules for classification: 1st points; 2nd goal difference; 3rd goals scored; 4th head-to-head points; 5th head-to-head goal difference; 6th head-to-head goals scored; 7th fair play; 8th draw (Regulation, p.52-53).
(D) Disqualified

=== 2012-13 Ukrainian Cup Results ===
22 September 2012 Round of 32	Stal Alchevsk	2–3 (aet)	Arsenal	Alchevsk
16:30	Stepanyuk 40'; Hrytsay 116'	Summary	Homenyuk 68', 100'; Shakhov (yellow card) 57' (yellow-red card) 109'; Kobakhidze 111'	Stadium: Stal Stadium; Attendance: 4,000; Referee: Andriy Yablonskyi (Ternopil)

31 October 2012 Round of 16	Avanhard Kramatorsk	0–1	Arsenal	Kramatorsk
12:00		Summary	Kobakhidze 85'	Stadium: Avanhard Stadium; Attendance: 4,100

17 April 2013 Quarter-finals	Arsenal	1–2	Chornomorets Odesa	Kyiv
20:00	Tkachuk 45+1'; Kyrylo Sydorenko (yellow card) 58'	Summary	Burdujan 6'; Kutas (yellow card) 45+1'; Matos (yellow card) 66'; Fontanello 77'; Anderson Santana (yellow card) 90+2'	Stadium: Valeriy Lobanovskyi Dynamo Stadium; Attendance: 1,600; Referee: (Ukraine) Yuri Mozharovskiy

=== UEFA Europa League ===
==== Third qualifying round ====
2 August 2012 3QR; 1st Leg	Arsenal Kyiv (Ukraine)	3–0 ^{1}	(Slovenia) Mura 05	Kyiv
20:00	Mazilu 6'; Kovpak 61'; Matoukou 83'	Report		Stadium: Dynamo Stadium; Attendance: 3,200; Referee: (Finland) Antti Munukka

9 August 2012 3QR; 2nd Leg	Mura 05 (Slovenia)	0–2 (3–2 agg.)	(Ukraine) Arsenal Kyiv	Maribor
22:00		Report	Kobakhidze 2'; Symonenko (red card) 31'; Homenyuk 61'; Shakhov (yellow card) 71' (yellow-red card) 90+4'	Stadium: Ljudski vrt Attendance: 3,200; Referee: (Austria) Oliver Drachta

Notes

- Note 1: UEFA awarded Mura 05 a 3–0 win due to Arsenal Kyiv fielding suspended player Éric Matoukou in the first leg. The original match had ended in a 3–0 win for Arsenal Kyiv.

== Squad statistics ==
=== Goal scorers ===
As of 7 October 2012

Place	Position	Nation	Number	Name	Premier League	Ukrainian Cup	Europa League	Total
1	FW	(Ukraine)	22	Volodymyr Homenyuk	3	2	1	6
2	FW	(Ukraine)	9	Oleksandr Kovpak	3	0	1	4
2	FW	(Uzbekistan)	16	Maksim Shatskikh	4	0	0	4
4	MF	(Georgia (country))	19	Alexander Kobakhidze	1	1	1	3
5	FW	(Ghana)	20	Dominic Adiyiah	2	0	0	2
6	DF	(Cameroon)	14	Éric Matoukou	0	0	1	1
6	FW	(Romania)	7	Ionuț Mazilu	0	0	1	1
6	MF	(Lithuania)	13	Saulius Mikoliūnas	1	0	0	1
				TOTALS	14	3	5	22

=== Appearances and goals ===
As of 7 October 2012

No.	Pos	Nat	Player	Total		Premier League		Ukrainian Cup		Europe League	
No.	Pos	Nat	Player	Apps	Goals	Apps	Goals	Apps	Goals	Apps	Goals
4	DF	(Ukraine) UKR	Serhiy Symonenko	13	0	10+1	0	0+1	0	1	0
6	DF	(Brazil) BRA	Rafael Santos	2	0	2	0	0	0	0	0
7	FW	(Romania) ROU	Ionuț Mazilu	6	1	1+3	0	0	0	2	1
8	MF	(Ukraine) UKR	Oleksandr Maksymov	5	0	2+1	0	0	0	2	0
9	FW	(Ukraine) UKR	Oleksandr Kovpak	10	4	7+1	3	0	0	0+2	1
10	MF	(Romania) ROU	George Florescu	6	0	6	0	0	0	0	0
11	MF	(Ukraine) UKR	Artem Starhorodskyi	12	0	7+3	0	1	0	0+1	0
12	GK	(Ukraine) UKR	Yevhen Borovyk	7	0	5	0	1	0	1	0
13	MF	(Lithuania) LTU	Saulius Mikoliūnas	11	1	4+4	1	1	0	1+1	0
14	DF	(Cameroon) CMR	Éric Matoukou	9	1	8	0	0	0	1	1
15	DF	(Montenegro) MNE	Janko Simović	2	0	0	0	1	0	0+1	0
16	FW	(Uzbekistan) UZB	Maksim Shatskikh	14	4	9+2	4	1	0	2	0
17	DF	(Ukraine) UKR	Andriy Hitchenko	6	0	2+1	0	1	0	2	0
19	MF	(Georgia (country)) GEO	Alexander Kobakhidze	13	3	5+5	1	0+1	1	2	1
20	FW	(Ghana) GHA	Dominic Adiyiah	12	2	7+2	2	1	0	2	0
22	FW	(Ukraine) UKR	Volodymyr Homenyuk	12	6	9+1	3	1	2	0+1	1
28	DF	(Ukraine) UKR	Volodymyr Polyovyi	13	0	10	0	1	0	2	0
31	MF	(Brazil) BRA	Leandro	12	0	9+1	0	1	0	1	0
33	DF	(Ukraine) UKR	Andriy Khomyn	3	0	1+1	0	0+1	0	0	0
52	MF	(Ukraine) UKR	Yevhen Shakhov	11	0	7+1	0	1	0	2	0
77	GK	(Ukraine) UKR	Yuriy Pankiv	7	0	6	0	0	0	1	0
78	MF	(Ukraine) UKR	Serhiy Valyayev	5	0	3+2	0	0	0	0	0
Players who appeared for Arsenal who left the club during the season:
27	MF	(Ukraine) UKR	Volodymyr Arzhanov	1	0	1	0	0	0	0	0

=== Disciplinary record ===
Number	Nation	Position	Name	Premier League		Ukrainian Cup		Europa League		Total	
Number	Nation	Position	Name	Yellow card	Red card	Yellow card	Red card	Yellow card	Red card	Yellow card	Red card
4	(Ukraine)	DF	Serhiy Symonenko	3	0	0	0	0	1	3	1
6	(Brazil)	DF	Rafael Santos	1	0	0	0	0	0	1	0
10	(Romania)	MF	George Florescu	2	1	0	0	0	0	2	1
11	(Ukraine)	MF	Artem Starhorodskyi	1	1	0	0	0	0	1	1
12	(Ukraine)	GK	Yevhen Borovyk	1	0	0	0	0	0	1	0
13	(Lithuania)	MF	Saulius Mikoliūnas	5	0	0	0	1	0	6	0
14	(Cameroon)	DF	Éric Matoukou	2	0	0	0	0	0	2	0
16	(Uzbekistan)	FW	Maksim Shatskikh	2	0	0	0	1	0	3	0
19	(Georgia (country))	MF	Alexander Kobakhidze	1	0	1	0	0	0	2	0
20	(Ghana)	FW	Dominic Adiyiah	1	0	0	0	0	0	1	0
22	(Ukraine)	FW	Volodymyr Homenyuk	2	0	1	0	0	0	3	0
28	(Ukraine)	DF	Volodymyr Polyovyi	2	0	0	0	1	0	3	0
52	(Ukraine)	MF	Yevhen Shakhov	3	1	0	1	0	1	3	3
77	(Ukraine)	GK	Yuriy Pankiv	1	0	0	0	0	0	1	0
			TOTALS	27	3	2	1	3	2	32	6
