= 2008–09 Ukrainian First League =

Ukrainian First League
- Season: 2008–09
- Champions: Zakarpattia Uzhhorod
- Promoted: Zakarpattia Uzhhorod; Obolon Kyiv
- Relegated: (all withdrew); Komunalnyk Luhansk; Knyazha Schaslyve; Ihroservice Simferopol
- Top goalscorer: 22 - Oleksandr Pyschur (Volyn Lutsk)
- Biggest home win: Obolon 6–0 Ihroservice; Obolon 6–0 Sevastopol
- Biggest away win: Prykarpattya 0–5 Dniester
- Highest scoring: Prykarpattya 2–6 Sevastopol; Obolon 6-2 Stal

The 2008–09 Ukrainian First League was the eighteenth since its establishment. The Professional Football League (PFL) decreased the number of teams in the league. This season, there are 18 teams instead of 20 teams competing. Two of the teams were relegated from the 2007–08 Ukrainian Premier League and two were promoted from the 2007–08 Ukrainian Second League. To decrease the number of teams in the competition 4 teams were relegated from the 2007–08 Ukrainian First League season.

== Teams ==
=== Promoted teams ===
Both of the following two teams were promoted from Druha Liha and debuting in the Ukrainian First League:

Group A

- Knyazha Schaslyve – Druha Liha champion (debut)

Group B

- Komunalnyk Luhansk – Druha Liha champion (debut)

=== Relegated teams ===
Two teams were relegated from the Ukrainian Premier League 2007–08 season after finishing on the bottom of the competition:

- Naftovyk-Ukrnafta Okhtyrka – 15th place (Returning after a seasons)
- Zakarpattia Uzhhorod – 16th place (Returning after a seasons)

=== Withdrawn teams ===
On June 26, 2008 MFC Mykolaiv was withdrawn from competitions. On July 1, 2008, the club was announced about the official disbandment. Due to the public pressure and with help of Hryhoriy Surkis, it became possible to preserve the club in professional competitions. MFK Mykolaiv was admitted to the 2008–09 Ukrainian Second League instead of the third team of Dynamo, FC Dynamo-3 Kyiv.

=== Location ===
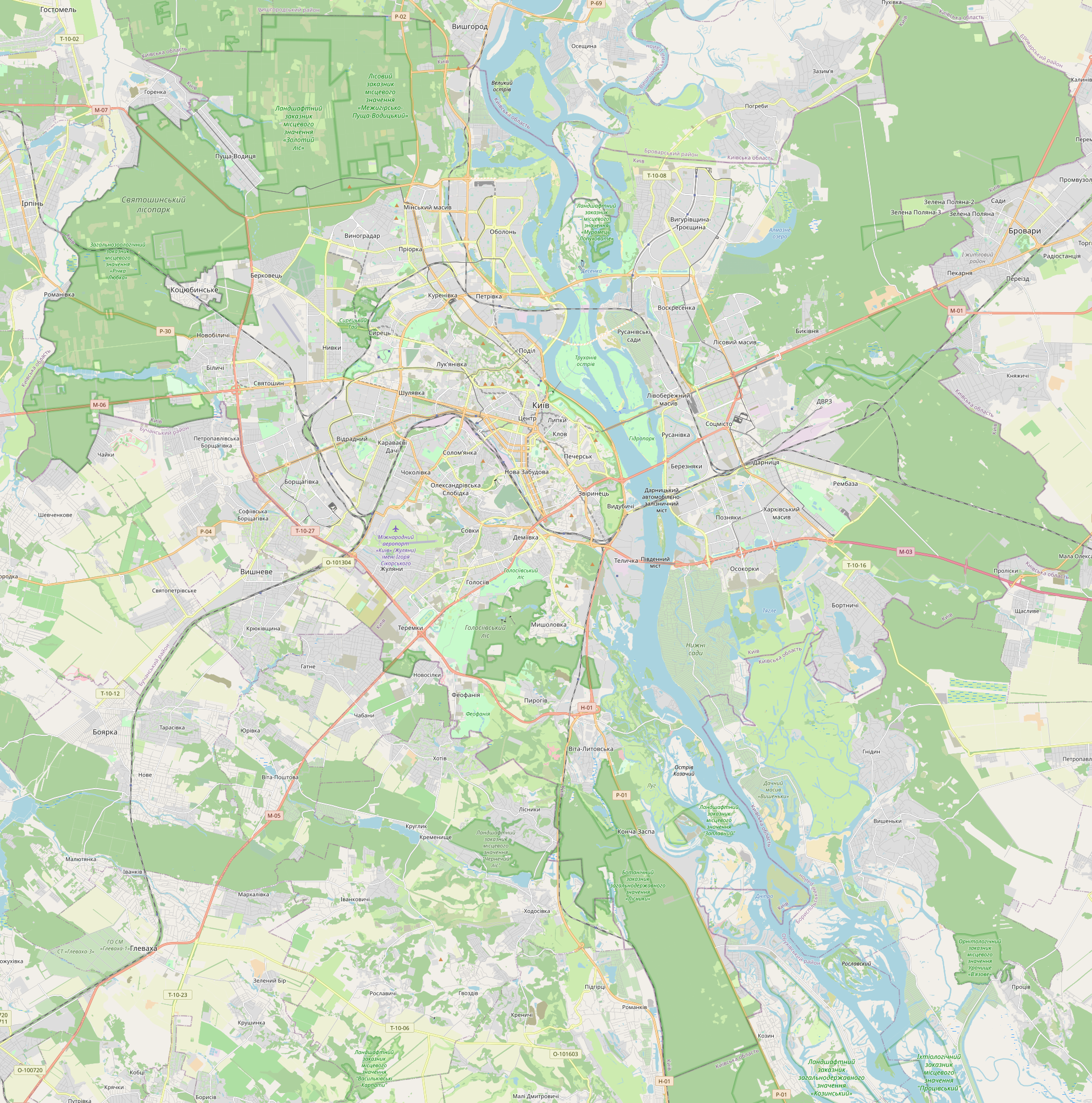
Kyiv city home venues of teams in the League
Locations of teams in First League

== Competition information ==
Placing of teams in table of standings are done in the following order:

- number of accumulated points
- number of wins
- difference(GD) between goals for(GF) and goals allowed(GA)
- number of goals for(GF)
- The League Fair-play ranking

The next tie-break is a simple draw.

== Final standings ==
Pos	Team	Pld	W	D	L	GF	GA	GD	Pts	Promotion or relegation
1	Zakarpattia Uzhhorod (C, P)	32	21	6	5	55	28	+27	69	Promoted to Ukrainian Premier League
2	Obolon Kyiv (P)	32	19	6	7	74	40	+34	63	Promoted to Ukrainian Premier League
3	PFC Oleksandria	32	15	9	8	43	31	+12	54	
4	PFC Sevastopol	32	15	6	11	43	41	+2	51	
5	Volyn Lutsk	32	15	5	12	48	46	+2	50	
6	Krymteplytsia Molodizhne	32	14	7	11	40	39	+1	49	
7	Desna Chernihiv	32	13	8	11	31	33	−2	47	
8	Dynamo-2 Kyiv	32	11	14	7	43	42	+1	47	
9	Dniester Ovidiopol	32	11	10	11	39	40	−1	43	
10	Stal Alchevsk	32	11	10	11	33	39	−6	43	Fair Play Award
11	Ihroservice Simferopol (D)	32	12	6	14	42	47	−5	42	Withdrew (expelled) from PFL (Note: After the season completed, Ihroservice Simferopol withdrew due to licensing issues for the next season)
12	Naftovyk-Ukrnafta Okhtyrka (Note: Naftovyk-Ukrnafta Okhtyrka deducted 3 points by the Ukrainian Football Federation (January 22, 2009))	32	11	11	10	41	42	−1	41	
13	Feniks-Illichovets Kalinine	32	9	11	12	33	38	−5	38	
14	Enerhetyk Burshtyn	32	8	7	17	29	43	−14	31	
15	Helios Kharkiv	32	8	6	18	28	44	−16	30	
16	Prykarpattya Ivano-Frankivsk	32	7	7	18	26	54	−28	28	Avoided relegation (Note: Due to the licensing issues of Ihroservice Simferopol, Prykarpattya Ivano-Frankivsk who finished in 16th place were not relegated by the PFL.)
17	Knyazha Schaslyve (D)	32	5	5	22	22	23	−1	20	Withdrew (expelled) from PFL (Note: Knyazha Schaslyve withdrew after the winter break; Komunalnyk Luhansk was withdrawn from the league and its results were annulled)
–	Komunalnyk Luhansk (D)	0	2	1	10	12	31	—	0	Withdrew (expelled) from PFL

(C) Champions; (D) Disqualified; (P) Promoted

== Results ==
Home \ Away	DES	DNR	DK2	ENE	FEN	HEL	IHS	KNY	KRM	NAF	OBO	OLK	PIF	SEV	STA	VOL	HOV
Desna Chernihiv		1–3	2–1	1–0	0–0	1–0	1–0	0–0	2–3	1–0	3–2	0–0	0–0	1–1	2–1	0–1	0–1
Dnister Ovidiopol	1–0		1–2	1–1	2–0	1–1	3–0	+:-	0–0	1–1	1–3	1–1	1–0	1–1	1–2	1–3	1–3
Dynamo-2 Kyiv	2–2	2–1		3–2	2–2	1–1	3–1	+:-	2–2	1–1	0–0	1–1	0–3	1–2	0–0	3–2	1–1
Enerhetyk Burshtyn	1–2	0–0	2–0		1–2	2–1	0–1	1–1	0–1	1–1	2–1	0–3	2–0	2–1	1–3	0–0	1–2
Feniks-Illichovets Kalinino	1–2	2–1	3–1	3–2		2–3	0–0	+:-	0–1	2–2	1–1	0–0	2–1	0–0	2–2	1–2	1–2
Helios Kharkiv	3–1	0–1	2–2	1–0	0–1		1–1	+:-	0–1	0–1	1–2	1–3	2–1	0–1	2–0	1–0	0–1
Ihroservice Simferopol	3–0	2–2	0–1	1–2	1–0	3–0		1–0	2–1	3–0	1–2	1–2	1–0	4–2	1–1	2–3	1–1
Knyazha Schaslyve	-:+	0–2	2–2	-:+	1–2	1–1	-:+		-:+	3–0	1–2	-:+	-:+	-:+	1–3	3–0	1–3
Krymteplytsia Molodizhne	0–0	4–0	1–2	0–3	2–2	1–2	2–4	1–2		3–1	2–1	2–1	1–0	1–1	2–0	1–0	0–4
Naftovyk-Ukrnafta Okhtyrka	1–0	1–1	2–2	3–1	3–1	2–2	2–4	+:-	1–0		0–1	1–1	3–0	1–2	1–1	3–1	1–0
Obolon Kyiv	3–2	3–1	0–1	3–0	0–0	3–0	6–0	2–1	2–1	3–2		4–3	1–1	6–0	6–2	4–3	0–0
FC Oleksandriya	0–1	1–2	2–0	1–1	2–0	2–1	2–1	1–1	2–1	0–0	1–0		2–1	1–0	2–1	2–2	1–0
Prykarpattya Ivano-Frankivsk	0–0	0–5	1–3	1–1	0–0	1–0	2–0	0–2	2–1	1–1	3–3	0–2		2–6	2–1	0–4	1–3
Sevastopol	0–1	1–1	1–0	1–0	2–1	1–0	3–1	0–1	1–2	0–1	1–4	3–1	3–0		0–0	4–1	3–1
Stal Alchevsk	2–0	1–0	0–2	2–0	1–2	2–1	1–1	+:-	0–0	2–1	0–2	2–1	1–0	1–2		0–0	1–1
Volyn Lutsk	0–4	0–1	1–1	2–0	1–0	3–0	3–1	+:-	0–2	3–2	3–2	2–1	1–2	3–0	1–1		3–2
Hoverla Uzhhorod	3–1	4–1	1–1	1–0	1–0	2–1	1–0	2–0	1–1	0–1	3–2	2–1	2–1	2–0	2–0	2–0	

Updated to match(es) played on Jun 14, 2009. Source: PFL Persha Liha Calendar
Legend: Blue = home team win; Yellow = draw; Red = away team win.

== Top scorers ==
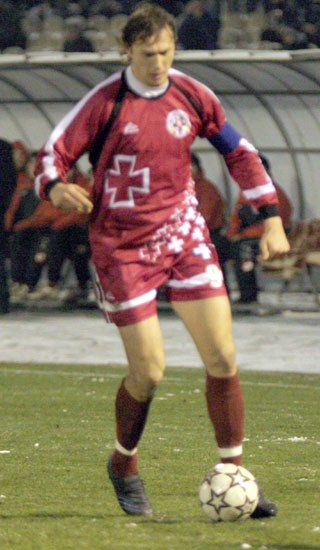
Oleksandr Pyschur

Scorer	Goals (Pen.)	Team
(Ukraine) Oleksandr Pyschur	22 (4)	Volyn
(Nigeria) Charles Newuche	16 (1)	Zakarpattia
(Ukraine) Valeriy Kutsenko	14 (2)	Obolon
(Ukraine) Matviy Bobal	14 (6)	Ihroservice (Note: Bobal signed with Premier League club Tavriya Simferopol (November 22, 2008))
(Ukraine) Andriy Shevchuk	13	PFC Sevastopol
(Ukraine) Vitaliy Prokopchenko	12 (1)	Feniks-Illichovets / Zakarpattia (Note: Prokopchenko transferred to Zakarpattia (March 24, 2009))
(Ukraine) Oleksandr Savanchuk	11 (3)	Feniks-Illichovets / Naftovyk-Ukrnafta (Note: Savanchuk transferred to Naftovyk-Ukrnafta Okhtyrka (March 24, 2009))
(Ukraine) Pavlo Onysko	10 (2)	Obolon
(Ukraine) Artem Miroshnychenko	9	Obolon
(Ukraine) Oleksandr Mandzyuk	9	Knyazha (Note: Mandzyuk signed with Premier League club FC Lviv (February 25, 2009))
(Ivory Coast) Souleymane Diaby	9	Krymteplitsia
(Ukraine) Dmytro Viter	9 (3)	Naftovyk-Ukrnafta

== Managers ==
Club	Coach	Replaced coach
Desna Chernihiv	(Ukraine) Mykhaylo Dunets	(Ukraine) Oleksandr Ryabokon’
Dniester Ovidiopol	(Ukraine) Andriy Parkhomenko	(Ukraine) Ihor Nehara
Dynamo-2 Kyiv	(Ukraine) Henadiy Lytovchenko	
Enerhetyk Burshtyn	(Ukraine) Mykhaylo Savka	
Feniks-Illichovets Kalinine	(Ukraine) Oleksandr Haidash	
Helios Kharkiv	(Ukraine) Serhiy Kandaurov	(Ukraine) Yuriy Pohrebnyak
Ihroservice Simferopol	(Ukraine) Serhiy Shevchenko	
Knyazha Schaslyve	(Ukraine) Vitaliy Levchenko	
Komunalnyk Luhansk	(Ukraine) Yuriy Malyhin	(Ukraine) Mykhaylo Dunets
Krymteplitsia Molodizhne	(Ukraine) Mykhaylo Sachko	
Naftovyk-Ukrnafta Okhtyrka	(Ukraine) Valeriy Horodov	
Obolon Kyiv	(Ukraine) Yuriy Maksymov	
PFC Oleksandria	(Ukraine) Yuriy Koval	
Prykarpattya Ivano-Frankivsk	(Ukraine) Mykola Prystay	(Ukraine) Stepan Matviyiv
PFC Sevastopol	(Ukraine) Oleh Leschynskyi	(Ukraine) Serhiy Puchkov
Stal Alchevsk	(Ukraine) Vadym Plotnikov	
Volyn Lutsk	(Ukraine) Vitaliy Kvartsyanyi	
Zakarpattia Uzhhorod	(Ukraine) Mykhaylo Ivanytsya	(Ukraine) Volodymyr Vasyutyk

== Withdrawn teams ==
=== Komunalnyk Luhansk ===
After competing in thirteen rounds of the competition Komunalnyk Luhansk withdrew from the PFL on October 17, 2008. The PFL annulled all the results from the competition and adjusted the standings. Komunalnyk had a record of 2 wins, 1 draw and 10 losses scoring 12 goals and having 31 goals scored against them in the thirteen games that they played in. At the end of the 13th round Komunalnyk was in 17th place in the standings. Yuri Kudinov was the team's leading goal scorer with 8 goals (3 penalties).

=== Knyazha Schaslyve ===
Knyazha withdrew on the March 25, 2009. The PFL will award technical victories to teams that are to play against Knyazha after the winter break. Knyazha in 18 games had a record of 5 wins, 5 draws, and 8 losses scoring 22 goals and having 23 goals scored against them. At the end of the 18th round Knyazha was in 14th place in the standings. Oleksandr Mandziuk was the team's leading goal scorer with 9 goals.

=== Ihroservis Simferopol ===
Ihroservis failed to pay league dues on time and were excluded from competitions for the next season.

== Awards ==
- Best coach – Yuri Maximov (Obolon)
- Best official – Yevhen Aranovsky (Kyiv)
- Best player – Oleksandr Pischur (Volyn)
- Best scorer – Oleksandr Pischur (Volyn)
- Fair Play Champion – FC Stal Alchevsk

== See also ==
- 2008–09 Ukrainian Second League
- 2008–09 Ukrainian Premier League
