= Malygin (surname) =

Malygin or Malyhin (Russian: Малыгин, Ukrainian: Малигін) is a Russian masculine surname, its feminine counterpart is Malygina or Malyhina. It may refer to

- Aleksandr Malygin (born 1979), Ukrainian football player
- Daria Malygina (born 1994), Russian volleyball player
- Ekaterina Malygina (born 1993), Russian group rhythmic gymnast
- Elena Malõgina (born 2000), Russian-born Estonian tennis player
- Stepan Malygin (died 1764), Russian Arctic explorer
- Vladimir Malygin (born 1950), Russian diplomat
- Volodymyr Malyhin (born 1949), Ukrainian football player, father of Aleksandr and Yuriy
- Yuriy Malyhin (born 1971), Ukrainian football player
