= Hrytsay =

Hrytsay is a surname. Notable people with the surname include:

- Oleksandr Hrytsay (born 1977), Ukrainian footballer
- Vitaliy Hrytsay (born 1991), Ukrainian footballer
