= Malygin =

Malygin (Russian: Малыгин) is a Russian masculine surname that may refer to

- Malygin (surname)
- Malygina Strait or Malygin Strait in Siberia, Russia
- Malygin (1912 icebreaker), a Russian and later Soviet icebreaker launched in 1912 and lost in 1940.
- Malygin (1945 icebreaker), formerly the Finnish icebreaker Voima that was handed over to the Soviet Union was war reparations in 1945 and broken up in 1971.
