= Pelé (footballer, born 1991) =

Portuguese-Bissau-Guinean footballer

Personal information
- Full name: Judilson Mamadu Tuncará Gomes
- Date of birth: 29 September 1991 (age 35)
- Place of birth: Agualva-Cacém, Portugal
- Height: 1.82 m (6 ft 0 in)
- Position: Defensive midfielder

Youth career
- 2006–2009: Belenenses

Senior career*
Years	Team	Apps	(Gls)
2009–2011	Belenenses	32	(0)
2011	Genoa	0	(0)
2011–2015	AC Milan	0	(0)
2012–2013	→ Arsenal Kyiv (loan)	5	(0)
2013–2014	→ Olhanense (loan)	14	(0)
2014–2015	→ Belenenses (loan)	29	(6)
2015–2017	Benfica	0	(0)
2015–2016	→ Paços Ferreira (loan)	29	(4)
2017	→ Feirense (loan)	1	(0)
2017–2018	Rio Ave	31	(7)
2018–2023	Monaco	8	(0)
2018	Monaco B	1	(0)
2019	→ Nottingham Forest (loan)	9	(0)
2019–2020	→ Reading (loan)	31	(1)
2020–2021	→ Rio Ave (loan)	25	(2)
2022–2023	→ Famalicão (loan)	12	(0)

International career
2009	Portugal U18	3	(1)
2009–2010	Portugal U19	11	(0)
2010–2011	Portugal U20	19	(1)
2011	Portugal U21	3	(0)
2017–2022	Guinea-Bissau	23	(1)
Medal record
Men's football
Representing Portugal
FIFA U-20 World Cup
Runner-up	2011 Colombia
- * Club domestic league appearances and goals as of 22:46, 4 May 2023 (UTC)

Judilson Mamadu Tuncará Gomes CvIH (born 29 September 1991), known as Pelé, is a professional footballer who plays as a defensive midfielder. Born in Portugal, he represented the Guinea-Bissau national team at the senior international level.

== Club career ==
=== Belenenses ===
Born in Agualva-Cacém to Bissau-Guinean parents, Pelé started his career with local Belenenses. He made his first-team – and Primeira Liga – debut on 11 January 2009, playing the full 90 minutes in a 1–0 away win against Rio Ave.

Much more used in his first full season (seven starts, 642 minutes of action), Pelé's team would nonetheless suffer relegation, ranking second-bottom.

=== Italy ===
On 4 January 2011, after having been linked to the club in September 2010, Pelé was signed by Serie A side Genoa, with the deal being made effective in the summer. However, he only appeared for the under-20 reserves during his spell.

On 30 August 2011, Pelé was exchanged with AC Milan's Mario Sampirisi, both in a co-ownership deal. He played as an overage player (only four players born in 1991 were allowed that season) for the B team in his first year.

=== Loans ===
On 31 July 2012, Pelé was loaned out to Arsenal Kyiv in the Ukrainian Premier League. He spent the following campaign in the same situation, with Olhanense back in his homeland.

After a successful loan spell at Belenenses, where he scored seven competitive goals to help his team finish in sixth position and qualify for the UEFA Europa League, Pelé attracted the interest of Benfica, who signed him for 2015–16. He was immediately loaned to Paços de Ferreira, and on 31 January 2017, still owned by the former, joined Feirense also in the Portuguese top flight.

=== Rio Ave ===
On 29 June 2017, Pelé signed a five-year contract with Rio Ave. He scored seven league goals in 38 official matches in his first and only season, helping to qualification for the Europa League second qualifying round after a sixth-place finish.

=== Monaco ===
Pelé moved to Ligue 1 in July 2018, agreeing to a five-year deal at Monaco – Benfica and Rio Ave shared the €10 million transfer fee in equal parts. He made his debut in the competition on 28 September, starting in a 2–0 away loss to Saint-Étienne and being replaced by Benjamin Henrichs late into the second half.

On 31 January 2019, Pelé joined English club Nottingham Forest on loan for the remainder of the season. On 6 August, in the same situation, he moved to Reading also of the EFL Championship. He scored his only goal for the latter on 7 March 2020, in a 3–1 away victory over Birmingham City.

Pelé returned to Rio Ave on 29 September 2020, on yet another loan. On 5 August 2022, still owned by Monaco, he agreed to a deal at Famalicão.

== International career ==
Pelé played twice for Portugal in the 2010 UEFA European Under-19 Championship qualification, in both games as a substitute, but was not selected for either the final tournament or the elite qualifying phase. He was then picked for a warm-up friendly before the 2011 FIFA U-20 World Cup, a 3–3 draw with France, and appeared in all the matches in the finals in Colombia as the nation finished in second position.

Pelé made his debut for Guinea-Bissau on 10 June 2017, starting in a 1–0 win over Namibia for the 2019 Africa Cup of Nations qualifiers. He was selected by manager Baciro Candé for the finals in Egypt, playing three games in a group-stage exit.

Also part of the squad for the 2021 tournament, Pelé missed a penalty in the last minutes of the 0–0 draw against Sudan in Garoua.

== Career statistics ==
=== Club ===
As of 30 May 2021

Appearances and goals by club, season and competition
Club	Season	League			National cup		League cup		Other		Total	
Club	Season	Division	Apps	Goals	Apps	Goals	Apps	Goals	Apps	Goals	Apps	Goals
Belenenses	2008–09	Primeira Liga	3	0	0	0	1	0	—		4	0
Belenenses	2009–10	Primeira Liga	13	0	2	0	0	0	—		15	0
Belenenses	2010–11	Liga de Honra	16	0	2	0	3	0	—		21	0
Belenenses	Total		32	0	4	0	4	0	—		40	0
Genoa	2010–11	Serie A	0	0	0	0	0	0	—		0	0
AC Milan	2011–12	Serie A	0	0	0	0	0	0	—		0	0
Arsenal Kyiv (loan)	2012–13	Ukrainian Premier League	5	0	2	0	0	0	—		7	0
Olhanense (loan)	2013–14	Primeira Liga	14	0	1	0	1	0	—		16	0
Belenenses (loan)	2014–15	Primeira Liga	30	6	4	1	5	0	—		39	7
Benfica	2015–16	Primeira Liga	0	0	0	0	0	0	—		0	0
Paços Ferreira (loan)	2015–16	Primeira Liga	29	4	2	0	2	0	—		33	4
Feirense (loan)	2016–17	Primeira Liga	1	0	0	0	0	0	—		1	0
Rio Ave	2017–18	Primeira Liga	31	7	4	0	3	0	—		38	7
Monaco	2018–19	Ligue 1	8	0	1	0	1	0	1 (Note: Appearance in Trophée des Champions)	0	11	0
Monaco B	2018–19	Championnat National 2	1	0	—		—		—		1	0
Nottingham Forest (loan)	2018–19	Championship	9	0	0	0	0	0	—		9	0
Reading (loan)	2019–20	Championship	31	1	2	0	1	0	—		34	1
Rio Ave (loan)	2020–21	Primeira Liga	25	2	1	0	0	0	2 (Note: Appearances in Primeira Liga promotion/relegation play-offs)	0	28	2
Career total			216	20	21	1	17	0	3	0	257	21

=== International ===
Appearances and goals by national team and year
National team	Year	Apps	Goals
Guinea-Bissau	2017	1	0
Guinea-Bissau	2018	4	0
Guinea-Bissau	2019	9	0
Guinea-Bissau	2020	3	0
Guinea-Bissau	2021	3	1
Guinea-Bissau	2022	3	0
Total		23	1

Scores and results list Guinea-Bissau's goal tally first, score column indicates score after each Pelé goal.

List of international goals scored by Pelé
No.	Date	Venue	Opponent	Score	Result	Competition
1	26 March 2021	Mavuso Sports Centre, Manzini, Eswatini	Eswatini	3–1	3–1	2021 Africa Cup of Nations qualification

== Honours ==
Portugal U20

- FIFA U-20 World Cup runner-up: 2011

Orders

- Knight of the Order of Prince Henry
