= Saša Todić =

Serbian footballer

Personal information
- Full name: Saša Todić
- Date of birth: 26 March 1974 (age 52)
- Place of birth: Zrenjanin, SFR Yugoslavia
- Height: 1.87 m (6 ft 2 in)
- Position: Goalkeeper

Youth career
- 1984–1993: Proleter Zrenjanin

Senior career*
| Years | Team | Apps | (Gls) |
| 1993–2000 | Proleter Zrenjanin | 128 | (0) |
| 1994–1995 | → Jastrebac Niš (loan) | 13 | (0) |
| 2000–2005 | Vojvodina | 153 | (0) |
| 2006–2008 | Tavriya Simferopol | 58 | (0) |
| 2009 | Krymteplytsia Molodizhne | 7 | (0) |
| 2010–2011 | Novi Sad | 8 | (0) |
| Total | | 367 | (0) |

Managerial career
- 2010–2011: Novi Sad (Assistant coach)
- 2011–2014: Vojvodina (Goalkeeper coach)
- 2014–2016: Fujairah (Goalkeeper coach)
- 2016–2017: Vojvodina (Goalkeeper coach)
- 2017–2020: FA Thailand (Goalkeeper coach)
- 2020–2022: Al Dhafra (Goalkeeper coach)
- 2022-2025: Qadsia (Goalkeeper coach)
- 2025: Al Dhafra (Goalkeeper coach)
- * Club domestic league appearances and goals

Saša Todić (Serbian Cyrillic: Саша Тодић; born 26 March 1974) is a Serbian former footballer who played as a goalkeeper.

== Career ==
Todić made a name for himself at Proleter Zrenjanin (1993–2000) and Vojvodina (2000–2005), collecting over 100 appearances for each side in the top division. He later went on to play for two Ukrainian clubs, Tavriya Simferopol in the top flight (2006–2008) and Krymteplytsia Molodizhne in the second division (2009). In the 2010–11 season, Todić made eight appearances for Novi Sad in the second tier, while also serving as assistant manager to Zoran Govedarica. He later worked as a goalkeeping coach for his former club Vojvodina and the Thailand national football team.
