= Yuriy Fedosenko =

Ukrainian footballer (born 1989)

Personal information
- Full name: Yuriy Fedosenko
- Date of birth: 10 May 1989 (age 37)
- Place of birth: Kovel, Volyn Oblast, Ukrainian SSR
- Height: 1.77 m (5 ft 10 in)
- Position: Midfielder

Youth career
- 2001–2002: Volyn Lutsk
- 2002: Izotop Kuznetsovsk
- 2002–2003: Dynamo Kyiv
- 2004–2006: Obriy Nikopol

Senior career*
Years	Team	Apps	(Gls)
2007–2008	Helios Kharkiv	13	(1)
2008	Knyazha-2 Shchaslyve	2	(0)
2008–2009	Desna Chernihiv	10	(0)
2009	Feniks-Illichovets Kalinine	11	(1)
2010	Nyva Ternopil	2	(0)
2010–2011	Radomiak Radom	11	(1)
2013	Sumy	2	(0)
2013–2014	ODEK Orzhiv	6	(0)
2014–2018	FC Malynsk		
2018	Hoshcha-Ritter Hoshcha		
2019	Sokil Radyvyliv		
2019	Izotop-RAES Varash		
2020	Skala Stryi		
2021	Lehinʹ Bryukhovychi		
2021–2023	Bohun Brody		
- * Club domestic league appearances and goals

Yuriy Fedosenko (born 10 May 1989) is a Ukrainian former professional footballer who played as a midfielder.

== Biography ==
Fedosenko was born in Kovel, Volyn region in 1989. A pupil of Volyn Lutsk, he used to play for Dynamo Kyiv, Izotop Kuznetsovsk and Obriy Nikopol at youth level.

He started his senior career with Volyn Lutsk, but did not play a single official match for the first team. In 2007, he joined Helios Kharkiv, where he played 13 league matches, scoring once, and 1 match in the Ukrainian Cup. He joined Desna Chernihiv in 2008. In 2009, Yuriy joined Feniks-Illichovets Kalinine. In the first league for the team with Kalinine, he made 11 league appearances, scoring once, as well as three cup outings. In the following season, he played three matches in the first league for Nyva Ternopil. In 2010, he moved to Polish fourth-tier club Radomiak Radom. Then he returned to Ukraine, went through a training camp with Volyn Lutsk, but the head coach Anatoly Demyanenko refused to take Yuriy with the first team. In 2013, he signed a contract with Sumy, but he played only 2 matches in the first league. At the end of season, he left Sumy.

From 2013 to 2014, he played for ODEK Orzhiv. In the Ukrainian Amateur Championship, he played 6 matches. In 2014, he joined FC Malinsk, where he played until 2018.
