= Rostyslav Horetskyi =

Ukrainian footballer (born 1979)

Personal information
- Full name: Rostyslav Horetskyi
- Date of birth: 4 February 1979 (age 47)
- Place of birth: Ukraine, Soviet Union
- Height: 1.78 m (5 ft 10 in)
- Position: Defender

Team information
- Current team: FC Lviv
- Number: 15

Senior career*
Years	Team	Apps	(Gls)
1997–1998	FC Lviv (1992)	2	(0)
1998–1999	FC Karpaty-2 Lviv	6	(0)
1999–2002	FC Dynamo Lviv	83	(1)
2002–2003	FC Karpaty-2 Lviv	29	(1)
2003	FC Zakarpattia Uzhhorod	9	(0)
2004–2006	FC Hazovyk-Skala Stryi	67	(2)
2006–2008	FC Lviv	46	(0)
2008–2009	FC Arsenal Bila Tserkva	27	(0)
- * Club domestic league appearances and goals

Rostyslav Horetskyi (born 4 February 1979 in Ukraine, Soviet Union) is a professional Ukrainian football defender who plays for FC Lviv in the Ukrainian Premier League.
