= Vitaliy Rozghon =

Ukrainian footballer and manager

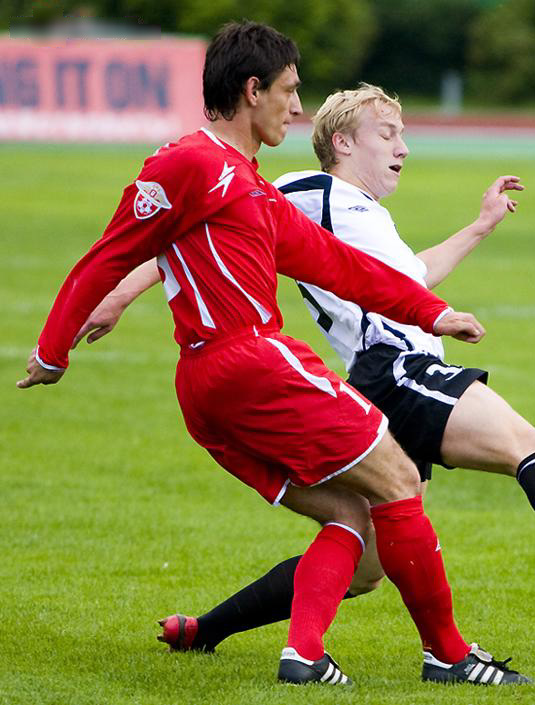

Personal information
- Full name: Vitaliy Viktorovych Rozghon
- Date of birth: 23 March 1980 (age 46)
- Place of birth: Khmelnytskyi, Ukrainian SSR
- Height: 1.77 m (5 ft 9 1/2 in)
- Position: Defender

Youth career
- Podillya Khmelnytskyi

Senior career*
Years	Team	Apps	(Gls)
1997	Podillya Khmelnytskyi	1	(0)
1997	Daugava Rīga	2	(0)
1998–1999	Skonto Rīga	1	(0)
1999–2000	Krylia Sovetov Samara	1	(0)
2000	→ Krylia Sovetov-2 Samara	14	(1)
2000–2001	Nyva Ternopil	12	(0)
2000–2001	→ Ternopil-Nyva-2	12	(0)
2001–2003	Volyn Lutsk	74	(0)
2004–2007	Arsenal Kyiv	64	(0)
2007	Tavriya Simferopol	5	(0)
2008	Mashuk-KMV Pyatigorsk	30	(0)
2009–2010	Lviv	27	(0)
2010	Volyn Lutsk	6	(0)
2010–2011	Sumy	8	(0)
2011–2012	Naftovyk-Ukrnafta Okhtyrka	18	(1)
2012–2013	Tytan Armyansk	19	(0)
2013–2015	Arsenal-Kyivshchyna Bila Tserkva	2	(0)
Total		296	(2)

Managerial career
- 2015: Arsenal-Kyivshchyna Bila Tserkva
- 2015–2016: Arsenal Kyiv (assistant)
- 2017–2018: Zirka Kropyvnytskyi (assistant)
- * Club domestic league appearances and goals

Vitaliy Viktorovych Rozghon (Ukrainian: Віталій Вікторович Розгон, born 23 March 1980) is a Ukrainian retired footballer and manager. In July 2012, he played for FC Tytan Armyansk.
