= Oleksandr Savanchuk =

Ukrainian footballer

Personal information
- Full name: Oleksandr Volodymyrovych Savanchuk
- Date of birth: 9 October 1982 (age 44)
- Place of birth: Horlivka, Ukrainian SSR
- Height: 1.74 m (5 ft 8 1/2 in)
- Position: Striker

Youth career
- 1990–1998: FC Shakhtar Horlivka
- 1998–2000: UOR Donetsk

Senior career*
Years	Team	Apps	(Gls)
2000–2006	FC Stal Alchevsk	112	(15)
2000–2002	FC Stal-2 Alchevsk	38	(14)
2007–2008	FC Krymteplytsia Molodizhne	45	(17)
2008	FC Feniks-Illichovets Kalinine	18	(4)
2009–2014	FC Naftovyk-Ukrnafta Okhtyrka	152	(23)
- * Club domestic league appearances and goals as of 5 August 2011

Oleksandr Savanchuk (Ukrainian: Олександр Володимирович Саванчук, born 9 October 1982 in Horlivka, in the Donetsk Oblast in the Ukrainian SSR of the Soviet Union) is a Ukrainian football striker.

Savanchuk graduated from FC Shakhtar Horlivka and UOR Donetsk. His first trainer was A. Maltsev.

He is married with Maryna.

Since 2015 plays in the Russian occupied part of Ukraine.
