= Oleksandr Mandzyuk =

Ukrainian footballer

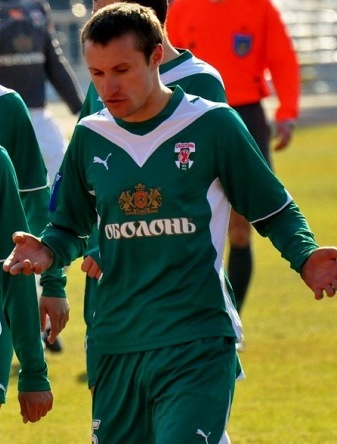

Personal information
- Full name: Oleksandr Vasylyovych Mandzyuk
- Date of birth: 10 January 1983 (age 43)
- Place of birth: Viline, Crimea Oblast, Ukrainian SSR
- Height: 1.79 m (5 ft 10 in)
- Position: Forward

Youth career
- 2000: UOR Simferopol

Senior career*
Years	Team	Apps	(Gls)
2001–2003	Dynamo Simferopol	51	(4)
2004–2006	Podillya Khmelnytskyi	87	(18)
2004	→ Obolon Kyiv (loan)	3	(0)
2006–2007	Lviv	15	(2)
2007–2009	Knyazha Shchaslyve	45	(24)
2009–2010	Lviv	37	(15)
2010–2012	Obolon Kyiv	53	(11)
2012–2015	Illichivets Mariupol	49	(2)
2015–2016	Obolon-Brovar Kyiv	13	(0)
2016–2019	Sluch Krasyliv	?	(?)
2019–2021	Podillya Khmelnytskyi	0	(0)
- * Club domestic league appearances and goals as of 25 July 2021

Oleksandr Vasylyovych Mandzyuk (Ukrainian: Олександр Васильович Мандзюк; born 10 January 1983) is a Ukrainian retired professional footballer.

== Personal life ==
He is the older brother of Vitaliy Mandzyuk, former member of Ukraine national football team.
