= Vitaliy Hrytsay =

Ukrainian footballer

Personal information
- Full name: Vitaliy Leonidovych Hrytsay
- Date of birth: 20 January 1991 (age 35)
- Place of birth: Horodyshche, Soviet Union
- Height: 1.79 m (5 ft 10 1/2 in)
- Position: Midfielder

Youth career
- 2005–2008: FC Knyazha Shchaslyve

Senior career*
Years	Team	Apps	(Gls)
2008	FC Zenit Boyarka	1	(0)
2008	FC Knyazha-2 Schaslyve	19	(0)
2009–2011	FC Lviv	42	(5)
2010	→ FC Lviv-2	6	(2)
2012–2013	FC Stal Alchevsk	50	(4)
2014	FC Desna Chernihiv	6	(0)
2014	FC Cherkaskyi Dnipro	8	(0)
2017–2020	FC LNZ-Lebedyn		

International career
2009	Ukraine U18	2	(0)
- * Club domestic league appearances and goals

Vitaliy Hrytsay (Ukrainian: Віталій Леонідович Грицай; born 20 January 1991) is a Ukrainian former professional footballer.
