= Oleksandr Zabara =

Ukrainian footballer

Personal information
- Full name: Oleksandr Oleksandrovych Zabara
- Date of birth: 5 July 1984 (age 42)
- Place of birth: Nova Kakhovka, Ukrainian SSR
- Height: 1.87 m (6 ft 2 in)
- Position: Defender

Youth career
- 1999-2000: Yunist Kakhovka
- 2000-2005: Krystal Kherson

Senior career*
Years	Team	Apps	(Gls)
2001–2004	Chornomorets Odesa	0	(0)
2001–2004	→ Chornomorets-2 Odesa	45	(3)
2005–2006	Zorya Luhansk	15	(0)
2006	Lokomotiv Minsk	11	(1)
2007	Šiauliai	15	(1)
2007	Interas Visaginas	3	(0)
2007–2008	Dnister Ovidiopol	27	(0)
2009	Oleksandriya	9	(0)
2009	Stal Dniprodzerzhynsk	2	(0)
2009–2010	Helios Kharkiv	9	(1)
2011–2012	Dinamo Brest	31	(2)
- * Club domestic league appearances and goals

Oleksandr Zabara (Ukrainian: Олександр Олександрович Забара; born 5 July 1984) is a Ukrainian retired footballer who last played for Dynamo Brest in Belarus.

== Career ==
Zabara started his senior career with Chornomorets Odesa. After that, he played for Zorya Luhansk, Lokomotiv Minsk, Šiauliai, FK Interas Visaginas, Dnister Ovidiopol, Oleksandriya, and Helios Kharkiv. In 2011, he signed for Dynamo Brest in the Belarusian Premier League, where he made thirty-three appearances and scored two goals.
