= Kakhaber Aladashvili =

Professional Georgian football player (born 1983)

Personal information
- Date of birth: 11 August 1983 (age 43)
- Place of birth: Tbilisi, Georgian SSR
- Height: 1.82 m (5 ft 11 1/2 in)
- Position: Defender

Youth career
- –1999: FC Gorda Rustavi

Senior career*
Years	Team	Apps	(Gls)
1999–2003	FC Gorda Rustavi	103	(9)
2003	FC Sioni Bolnisi	10	(0)
2004	Spartak Tbilisi	45	(7)
2004–2006	FC Dinamo Tbilisi	28	(1)
2006–2009	FC Dynamo Kyiv	2	(0)
2006–2009	→ FC Dynamo-2 Kyiv	20	(1)
2007	→ FC Dnipro Dnipropetrovsk (loan)	5	(0)
2007	→ FC Zakarpattia Uzhhorod (loan)	10	(0)
2008	→ FC Kharkiv (loan)	8	(0)
2009–2010	FC Anzhi Makhachkala	26	(0)
2010–2012	FC Zestaponi	37	(2)
2012–2013	FC Dila Gori	42	(1)
2014–2015	FC SKA-Energiya Khabarovsk	44	(3)

International career
2005–2006	Georgia	7	(0)
- * Club domestic league appearances and goals as of 29 November 2015

Kakhaber (Kakha) Aladashvili (Georgian: კახაბერ (კახა) ალადაშვილი; born 11 August 1983) is a professional Georgian football player.

== Career ==
Aladashvili joined Dynamo Kyiv in March 2006 and signed on 24 December 2008 with FC Anzhi Makhachkala.

== International career ==
Aladashvili played 2 times in UEFA Euro 2008 qualifying and is also a member of Georgian national football team.
