= Oleksandr Pikhur =

Ukrainian footballer

Personal information
- Full name: Oleksandr Pikhur
- Date of birth: 25 August 1982 (age 44)
- Place of birth: Kyiv, Soviet Union
- Height: 1.86 m (6 ft 1 in)
- Position: Forward

Senior career*
| Years | Team | Apps | (Gls) |
| 2001–2004 | FC CSKA Kyiv | 99 | (11) |
| 2004 | → FC Arsenal-2 Kyiv | 1 | (0) |
| 2005–2006 | FC Zakarpattia Uzhhorod | 17 | (3) |
| 2007–2008 | FC Kharkiv | 22 | (0) |
- * Club domestic league appearances and goals

Oleksandr Pikhur (born 25 August 1982) is a Ukrainian former professional football striker.
