= Volodymyr Malyhin =

Ukrainian and Soviet footballer and coach

Personal information
- Full name: Volodymyr Ilyich Malyhin
- Date of birth: 1 November 1949 (age 76)
- Place of birth: Voroshilovsk, Ukrainian SSR
- Position: Defender

Youth career
- Stal Voroshilovsk

Senior career*
Years	Team	Apps	(Gls)
1965–1969	Kommunarets Kommunarsk		
1970–1981	FC Zorya Luhansk	264	(1)
1981–1985	FC Sokil Rovenky		

International career
1972	USSR	3	(0)

Managerial career
- 1981–2000: FC Zorya Luhansk (youth teams)
- 2001–2002: FC Avanhard Rovenky (assistant)
- * Club domestic league appearances and goals

Volodymyr Ilyich Malyhin (Ukrainian: Володимир Ілліч Малигін, Russian: Владимир Ильич Малыгин, Vladimir Ilyich Malygin; born 1 November 1949 in Voroshilovsk) is a retired Ukrainian and Soviet football player and a current Ukrainian coach.

His sons Aleksandr Malygin and Yuriy Malyhin played football professionally.

== Honours ==
- Soviet Top League winner: 1972.

== International career ==
Malyhin made his debut for USSR on 29 June 1972 in a friendly against Uruguay.
