= Denys Andriyenko =

Ukrainian footballer

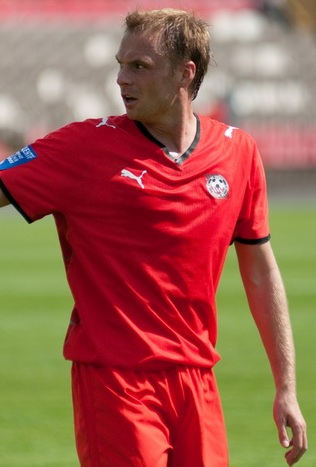

Personal information
- Date of birth: 12 April 1980 (age 46)
- Place of birth: Yevpatoria, Crimea, Ukrainian SSR, Soviet Union
- Height: 1.78 m (5 ft 10 in)
- Position: Midfielder

Team information
- Current team: Kryvbas Kryvyi Rih
- Number: 2

Senior career*
Years	Team	Apps	(Gls)
1997	Dynamo Saky	8	(0)
1998–2001	Tavriya Simferopol	29	(0)
1999	→ Titan Armyansk (loan)	10	(1)
2001–2002	Metalurh Donetsk	23	(0)
2001	Metalurh-2 Donetsk	4	(0)
2002	→ Polihraftechnika Oleksandria (loan)	12	(1)
2002	→ SKA-Energiya Khabarovsk (loan)	15	(0)
2003–2004	Kryvbas Kryvyi Rih	43	(1)
2004–2008	Dnipro Dnipropetrovsk	61	(0)
2008–2010	Kryvbas Kryvyi Rih	25	(1)
2011–2012	Dnipro Dnipropetrovsk	0	(0)
- * Club domestic league appearances and goals

Denys Andriyovych Andriyenko (Ukrainian: Денис Андрійович Андрієнко, born 12 April 1980) is a Ukrainian former footballer.

== Career ==
Andriyenko began playing football in the Ukrainian Second League with local club FC Dynamo Saky in 1997. He went on to play in the Ukrainian Premier League for SC Tavriya Simferopol and FC Metalurh Donetsk, both clubs sending him on loan spells to lower-division clubs. He joined Kryvbas for the first time in 2003. After one season, he left for FC Dnipro Dnipropetrovsk, only to return to Kryvbas in late 2008.
