= Serhiy Velychko =

Ukrainian footballer

Personal information
- Full name: Serhiy Mykolayovych Velychko
- Date of birth: 9 August 1976 (age 50)
- Place of birth: Simferopol, Soviet Union
- Height: 1.87 m (6 ft 1 1/2 in)
- Position: Goalkeeper

Senior career*
Years	Team	Apps	(Gls)
1994–1997	Dynamo Saky	61	(−53)
1997–2005	Tavriya	90	(−131)
2003	→ Dynamo Simferopol	3	(−5)
2006	Zakarpattia	2	(−5)
2006–2008	Naftovyk	63	(−66)
2009–2012	Vorskla Poltava	23	(−28)
- * Club domestic league appearances and goals

Serhiy Mykolayovych Velychko (Ukrainian: Сергій Миколайович Величко, born 9 August 1976 in Simferopol, Crimea, Ukrainian SSR) is a Ukrainian football goalkeeper who played for Vorskla Poltava in the Ukrainian Premier League.
