= FC Komunalnyk Luhansk =

- Full name: FC Komunalnyk Luhansk
- Founded: 2007
- Dissolved: 2008
- Ground: "Enerhetyk", Severodonetsk
- Manager: Yuriy Malyhyn
- League: Persha Liha

FC Komunalnyk Luhansk was a professional football team based in Luhansk, Ukraine. Komunalnyk Luhansk played in the Ukrainian Second League. It gained professional status in 2007. It played games on Enerhetyk Stadium in Severodonetsk. After winning the Druha Liha B Championship, Komunalnyk Luhansk were promoted to the Persha Liha for the 2008/09 season.

After competing in thirteen rounds of the competition Komunalnyk Luhansk withdrew from the PFL on October 17, 2008, and lost their professional status.

== Honors ==
- Ukrainian Druha Liha: 1

Champions 2007/08 Group B

== League and cup history ==
Season	Div.	Pos.	Pl.	W	D	L	GS	GA	P	Domestic Cup	Europe	Notes
2007–08	3rd "B"	1	34	22	7	5	56	26	73	1/64 finals		Promoted
2008–09	2nd	–	13	2	1	10	12	31	7	1/16 finals		Withdrew

== Head coaches ==
- 2007 Yuriy Malyhin
- 2007 Ihor Seroshtan
- 2007–08 Anatoliy Kuksov
- 2008 Yuriy Malyhin
- 2008 Mykhailo Dunets

== See also ==
- FC Yalos Yalta, a single season team
