= Anton Lutsyk =

Ukrainian footballer (born 1987)

Personal information
- Full name: Anton Vasylyovych Lutsyk
- Date of birth: 25 March 1987 (age 39)
- Place of birth: Ivano-Frankivsk, Ukrainian SSR
- Height: 1.79 m (5 ft 10 in)
- Position: Midfielder

Team information
- Current team: Ruch Popkowice

Youth career
- 2001–2004: VPU-21 Ivano-Frankivsk

Senior career*
Years	Team	Apps	(Gls)
2005–2011	Karpaty Lviv	3	(0)
2005–2008	Karpaty-2 Lviv	51	(2)
2011	Prykarpattya Ivano-Frankivsk	7	(0)
2011	Lviv	18	(2)
2012	Karpaty Yaremche	24	(5)
2013	Hal-Vapno Halych	6	(1)
2013	Karpaty Kolomyia	11	(3)
2014	Slaviya Otyniia	8	(0)
2014	Karpaty Kolomyia	9	(0)
2015	Wilki Wilcza		
2015–2016	Opolanin Opole Lubelskie		
2016	Hetman Zamość		
2017–2020	Stal Kraśnik		
2020–2021	Opolanin Opole Lubelskie	28	(2)
2021–2022	Ruch Popkowice	24	(10)
2022–2026	Stal Kraśnik	56	(1)
2026–	Ruch Popkowice	0	(0)
- * Club domestic league appearances and goals as of 22:12, 7 February 2026 (UTC)

Anton Lutsyk (Ukrainian: Антон Васильович Луцик; born 25 March 1987) is a Ukrainian professional footballer who plays as a midfielder for Polish club Ruch Popkowice.

He is the product of the Karpaty Lviv Youth School System.

== Honours ==
Stal Kraśnik

- IV liga Lublin: 2017–18

Stal Kraśnik II

- Klasa A Lublin I: 2024–25
