= Vitaliy Prokopchenko =

Ukrainian footballer

Personal information
- Full name: Vitaliy Viktorovych Prokopchenko
- Date of birth: 14 January 1983 (age 43)
- Place of birth: Zaporizhzhia, Ukrainian SSR, Soviet Union
- Height: 1.81 m (5 ft 11 1/2 in)
- Position: Forward

Youth career
- 1998–2000: Torpedo Zaporizhzhia

Senior career*
| Years | Team | Apps | (Gls) |
| 1999–2003 | FC Torpedo Zaporizhzhia | 55 | (12) |
| 2000 | → FC Viktor Zaporizhzhia (loan) | 13 | (0) |
| 2000–2001 | → SSSOR-Metalurh Zaporizhzhia (loan) | 28 | (4) |
| 2004–2005 | FC HU ZIDMU-Spartak Zaporizhzhia | 14 | (3) |
| 2005–2006 | FC Yalos Yalta | 26 | (7) |
| 2006–2007 | FC Tytan Armyansk | 28 | (18) |
| 2007–2008 | FC Krymteplytsia Molodizhne | 35 | (9) |
| 2008 | FC Feniks-Illichovets Kalinine | 17 | (12) |
| 2009 | FC Zakarpattia Uzhhorod | 13 | (1) |
| 2009 | PFC Oleksandriya | 8 | (2) |
| 2012–2013 | FC Tytan Armyansk | 32 | (13) |
| 2013–2014 | FC Naftovyk-Ukrnafta Okhtyrka | 23 | (3) |
| 2014–2015 | FC Tavria-Skif Rozdol | 24 | (25) |
- * Club domestic league appearances and goals

Vitaliy Prokopchenko (Ukrainian: Віталій Вікторович Прокопченко; born 14 January 1983) is a Ukrainian former professional football forward.

Prokopchenko is a product of the FC Torpedo Zaporizhzhia football academy. He became noticeable during couple of seasons in the Ukrainian First League when he was among the top scorers playing for Feniks-Illichovsk and Tytan.

In 2003 he tried unsuccessfully to sign with FC Dinamo Minsk in Belarus. After relegation of FC Torpedo Zaporizhzhia in 2003, Prokopchenko was actively looking to return to professional football trying to sign with SC Olkom Melitopol that was coached by his former first coach Vyacheslav Tropinin.
