= Yuriy Malyhin =

Ukrainian footballer and manager

Personal information
- Full name: Yuriy Volodymyrovych Malyhin
- Date of birth: 21 April 1971 (age 55)
- Place of birth: Voroshylovhrad, Ukrainian SSR
- Height: 1.82 m (6 ft 0 in)
- Position: Goalkeeper

Youth career
- Zorya SSSOR Voroshylovhrad

Senior career*
Years	Team	Apps	(Gls)
1988	FC Stakhanovets Stakhanov	4	(0)
1988–1989	FC Zorya Luhansk	6	(0)
1990–1995	FC Stal Alchevsk	100	(0)
1990	→ FC Soyuz Perevalsk		
1995–1996	FC Zorya Luhansk	51	(0)
1997	FC Metalurh Mariupol	4	(0)
1999	FC Ellada-Enerhiya Luhansk	15	(0)
1999–2000	FC Kristall Smolensk	6	(0)
2000	→ FC Kristall-2 Smolensk		
2001	FC Dinamo Saint Petersburg	25	(0)
2002	FC Lukoil Chelyabinsk	10	(0)
2003	FC Dynamo Stavropol	12	(0)
2003	FC Avanhard-Inter Rovenky	2	(0)
2003	FC Zorya Luhansk	4	(0)
2004	FC Polissya Zhytomyr	3	(0)
2004	FC Shakhtar Sverdlovsk	5	(0)

Managerial career
- 2005: FC Zorya-Hirnyk Luhansk (assistant)
- 2006: FC Zorya-2 Luhansk
- 2006: FC Zorya Luhansk (assistant)
- 2006: FC Zorya Luhansk
- 2007–2008: FC Komunalnyk Luhansk (sports director)
- 2007–2008: FC Komunalnyk Luhansk
- 2009: FC Hirnyk-Sport Komsomolsk
- 2010: FC Poltava
- 2011: FC Lysychansk
- 2013: FC Nistru Otaci
- * Club domestic league appearances and goals

Yuriy Malyhin (Ukrainian: Юрій Володимирович Малигін; born 29 April 1971) is a former Soviet and Ukrainian footballer and Ukrainian football manager.

He is a son of Volodymyr Malyhin.

Following the 2014 Russian aggression against Ukraine, Malyhin serves as a football functionary on the Russian occupied territories.
