= Volodymyr Homenyuk =

Ukrainian footballer

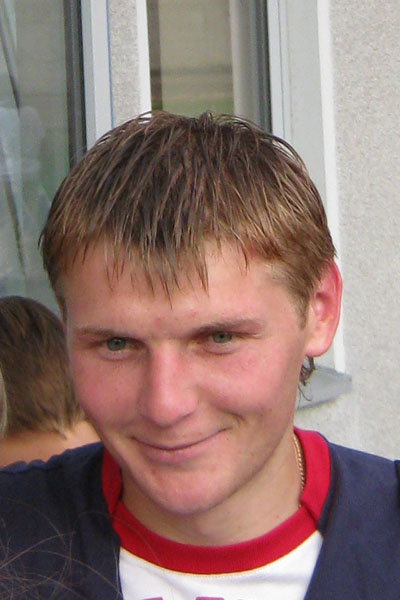
- Homenyuk in 2009

Personal information
- Full name: Volodymyr Mykhaylovych Homenyuk
- Date of birth: 19 July 1985 (age 41)
- Place of birth: Bokiima, Rivne Oblast, Ukrainian SSR, Soviet Union
- Height: 1.77 m (5 ft 9 1/2 in)
- Position: Forward

Youth career
- 2003–2004: Ikva Mlyniv

Senior career*
| Years | Team | Apps | (Gls) |
| 2003–2004 | Ikva Mlyniv | 13 | (0) |
| 2005–2008 | Tavriya Simferopol | 119 | (32) |
| 2009–2011 | Dnipro Dnipropetrovsk | 51 | (13) |
| 2011–2013 | Arsenal Kyiv | 44 | (8) |
| 2013–2015 | Metalist Kharkiv | 25 | (7) |
| 2015 | Stal Dniprodzerzhynsk | 7 | (0) |

International career
| 2008–2009 | Ukraine | 8 | (0) |

Managerial career
- 2018: Veres Rivne (assistant)
- 2018: Veres Rivne
- * Club domestic league appearances and goals

Volodymyr Mykhaylovych Homenyuk (Ukrainian: Володимир Михайлович Гоменюк; born 19 July 1985) is a Ukrainian retired football forward. He has been nicknamed the Wayne Rooney of Crimea.

== Career ==
=== Club ===
Before joining Tavriya in the winter of 2005, he played for Ikva Mlyniv. Homenyuk joined Tavriya when he was only 19 years old, and became an integral part of the team and soon became the captain.

Homenyuk joined FC Dnipro Dnipropetrovsk on 6 January 2009, signing a contract until 31 December 2013. His transfer involved Dnipro giving up Maksym Startsev to Tavriya Simferopol as well as money.

In 2015, he played for Stal Dniprodzerzhynsk in the Ukrainian Premier League.

=== International career ===
Homenyuk was called up for the Ukraine national football team on 1 June 2008, in a friendly match against Sweden which Ukraine won 1–0.
