= FC Knyazha Shchaslyve =

Knyazha Schaslyve
- Full name: Football Club Knyazha Schaslyve
- Nickname: Kniazi
- Founded: 2005
- Dissolved: 2009
- Ground: Kniazha Arena, Schaslyve, Kyiv Oblast
- Capacity: 1,000
- Chairman: Yuriy Kindzerskyi
- Manager: Vitaliy Levchenko
- League: Ukrainian First League
- 2008–09: 17th (withdrew)

FC Knyazha Shchaslyve was a Ukrainian football team based in the village of Shchaslyve, in the Kyiv Oblast of Ukraine.

== History ==
It was founded in 2005. Knyazha won the Ukrainian Second League group A in the 2008 season and were promoted to the Ukrainian First League. In 2009, the administration indicated that the club would not cease to exist but would restructure and function in some form, especially at the junior or youth levels.

== Honors ==
- Ukrainian Second League: 1

2007/08 Champions, group A

== League and cup history ==
=== Knyazha Shchaslyve ===
Season	Div.	Pos.	Pl.	W	D	L	GS	GA	P	Domestic Cup	Europe	Notes
2005–06	3rd "A"	12	28	6	11	11	32	35	29	1/64 finals		
2006–07	3rd "A"	5	28	14	9	5	34	24	51	1/32 finals		
2007–08	3rd "A"	1	30	24	5	1	70	13	77	1/16 finals		Promoted
2008–09	2nd	17	32	5	5	22	22	23	20	1/16 finals		Withdrew

== Reserves and academy ==
Knyazha-2 was the reserve squad of Knyazha Schaslyve. In March 2009, the administration of Knyazha Schaslyve removed both the main club from Persha Liha and its reserve team from the Druha Liha.

Knyazha-2 entered the professional leagues for the first time in 2008. The club decided to enter the Ukrainian Second League. Knyazha-2 had been competing in the Kyiv Oblast competition.

Season	Div.	Pos.	Pl.	W	D	L	GS	GA	P	Domestic Cup	Europe	Notes
2008–09	3rd "A"	17	32	4	2	26	15	35	14			Withdrew

== Managers ==
- 2005–2006 Viktor Ishchenko
- 2006 Vitaliy Levchenko
- 2007 Oleh Fedorchuk
- 2007–2008 Stepan Matviyiv
- 2008 Vitaliy Levchenko
- 2008 Viktor Dohadailo
- 2008–2009 Vitaliy Levchenko
