= 2009–10 Ukrainian First League =

Ukrainian First League
- Season: 2009–10
- Champions: PFC Sevastopol
- Promoted: PFC Sevastopol; Volyn Lutsk
- Relegated: Nyva Ternopil; FC Kharkiv; Desna Chernihiv
- Matches: 304
- Goals: 802 (2.64 per match)
- Top goalscorer: 19 - Serhiy Kucherenko (Krymteplitsia Molodizhne )
- Biggest home win: Oleksandria 5–0 Kharkiv (1 August 2009); Sevastopol 5–0 Dynamo-2 (26 August 2009)
- Biggest away win: Arsenal 2–7 Sevastopol (21 August 2009); Kharkiv 0–5 Helios (22 September 2009)
- Highest scoring: Arsenal 2–7 Sevastopol (21 August 2009)
- Longest winning run: 11 – Volyn (Round 25–26, Round 19 ppd., Round 27–34)
- Longest unbeaten run: 11 – Helios (Round 5–15)
- Longest losing run: 8 – Kharkiv (Round 9, Round 1 ppd., 10–15)
- Highest attendance: 8,400 Zirka – Oleksandria (29 May 2010)
- Lowest attendance: 50 Dynamo-2 – Helios (3 April 2010)

The 2009–10 Ukrainian First League was the nineteenth since its establishment. There were 18 teams competing. Two teams were relegated from the 2008–09 Ukrainian Premier League. Three teams were promoted from the 2008–09 Ukrainian Second League. Due to the 2009 flu pandemic which affected Ukraine in late October the PFL decide to break for winter earlier than they originally scheduled. The second half of the season began March 11, 2010.

== Teams ==
=== Promoted teams ===
These three teams were promoted from Druha Liha at the start of the season:

Group A

- Nyva Ternopil – Druha Liha champion (Returning after seven seasons)
- Arsenal Bila Tserkva - Playoff Winner (Debut)

Group B

- Zirka Kirovohrad – Druha Liha champion (Returning after six seasons)

=== Relegated teams ===
Two teams were relegated from the Ukrainian Premier League 2008–09 season

- FC Lviv – 15th place (Returning after a season)
- FC Kharkiv – 16th place (Previously as FC Arsenal Kharkiv)

=== Map ===
The following displays the location of teams.

Location of teams in Ukrainian First League 2009–10

== Playoff game ==
Prior to the beginning of the season FC Ihroservice Simferopol failed to pay their license dues for the season. To allow an extra team to be promoted, the PFL determined that a playoff game between the 2nd placed teams from Druha Liha – Arsenal Bila Tserkva and FC Poltava would determine the vacancy. This playoff game was played July 12, 2009.

July 12, 2009
17:00 UTC+3

Arsenal Bila Tserkva	1 – 0	FC Poltava
Derevliov 60'	Report

Central Stadium, Cherkasy
Attendance: 300
Referee: Vitaliy Hodulian (Odesa)

== Final standings ==
Pos	Team	Pld	W	D	L	GF	GA	GD	Pts	Promotion or relegation
1	PFC Sevastopol (C, P)	34	24	4	6	68	27	+41	76	Promoted to Ukrainian Premier League
2	Volyn Lutsk (P)	34	22	8	4	71	30	+41	74	Promoted to Ukrainian Premier League
3	Stal Alchevsk	34	19	8	7	55	35	+20	65	
4	FC Lviv	34	19	6	9	49	22	+27	63	
5	PFC Oleksandria	34	19	6	9	58	34	+24	63	
6	Krymteplitsia Molodizhne	34	17	8	9	53	28	+25	59	
7	Naftovyk-Ukrnafta Okhtyrka	34	17	6	11	45	35	+10	57	
8	Desna Chernihiv (D)	34	12	12	10	38	30	+8	48	Withdrew (Note: Desna Chernihiv completed the season but failed attestation for the 2010-11 season and their licence was removed. (June 21st, 2010))
9	Arsenal Bila Tserkva	34	12	10	12	48	44	+4	46	
10	Helios Kharkiv	34	12	10	12	42	47	−5	46	
11	Dnister Ovidiopol	34	12	8	14	44	47	−3	44	
12	Zirka Kirovohrad (Note: Zirka Kirovohrad deducted 3 points for failure of payment to contracted players. (January 28th, 2010))	34	11	13	10	38	40	−2	43	
13	Dynamo-2 Kyiv	34	12	5	17	35	46	−11	41	
14	Feniks-Illichivets Kalinine	34	10	7	17	39	52	−13	37	
15	Enerhetyk Burshtyn	34	8	11	15	32	49	−17	35	
16	Prykarpattya Ivano-Frankivsk	34	5	7	22	26	68	−42	22	
17	FC Kharkiv (D)	34	3	5	26	23	76	−53	14	Withdrew (expelled) from PFL (Note: FC Kharkiv were relegated to the Second League. After the season completed the club failed attestation and their license was withdrawn by the respective committee of the Football Federation of Ukraine for providing false information of the club's affairs.(June 23rd, 2010))
18	Nyva Ternopil (Note: Nyva Ternopil initially deducted 3 points for failure of payment of license fees. (October 2nd, 2009) Another 3 points were for non payment to players. (June 9th, 2010)) (R)	34	3	4	27	18	72	−54	7	Relegated to Ukrainian Second League

Source: Professional Football League of Ukraine
Rules for classification: 1st points; 2nd goal difference; 3rd goals scored; 4th fair play
(C) Champions; (D) Disqualified; (P) Promoted; (R) Relegated

== Results ==
Home \ Away (Note: Seven matches from Round 17 were postponed due to the 2009 flu pandemic which affected Ukraine in late October.)	ABT	DES	DNR	DK2	ENE	FEN	HEL	KHA	KRM	LVI	NAF	NVT	OLK	PIF	SEV	STA	VOL	ZIR
Arsenal Bila Tserkva		2–2	0–0	2–1	0–0	1–0	0–1	4–1 (Note: In this game in FC Kharkiv was represented by the youth squad of FC Arsenal Kharkiv, U-17.)	1–1	1–3	4–0	4–0	3–0	3–4	2–7	1–0	2–0	0–0
Desna Chernihiv	2–1		1–2	0–0	0–1	0–0	1–1	3–1	1–1	0–0	1–2	4–0	2–1	4–0	0–0	0–1	2–1	2–1
Dnister Ovidiopol	1–1	2–1		3–1	1–1	2–2	1–2	2–0	0–2	0–1	0–1	4–1	0–1	5–2	4–1	0–2	1–5	0–0
Dynamo-2 Kyiv	0–1	0–1	0–2		1–2	0–1	2–2	2–1	1–1	2–1	2–0	3–2	0–3	3–1	1–0	1–2	0–2	2–0
Enerhetyk Burshtyn	1–0	1–1	2–1	3–4		1–1	0–0	1–1	0–1	1–0	0–1	1–1	2–1	1–1	1–2	2–2	0–3	0–1
Feniks-Illichovets Kalinino	2–2	1–2	0–1	1–1	3–0		2–0	4–2	1–0	1–0	1–2	2–0	0–1	2–1	1–1	3–4	1–1	1–2
Helios Kharkiv	1–0	0–0	2–2	0–3	1–0	3–1		0–1	0–4	3–3	1–0	2–0	2–2	2–0	0–1	1–1	2–2	1–2
FC Kharkiv	0–4	0–4	1–3	0–1	3–0 (Note: Round 33 match between FC Kharkiv and Enerhetyk Burshtyn did not take place due to FC Kharkiv's players boycotting the game due to not payment of wages and no contracts for next season. PFL awards a 3–0 technical victory to Enerhetyk Burshtyn.)	1–2	0–5		1–2	1–0	1–4	1–0	1–1	1–2	0–3	0–1	1–3	0–0
Krymteplytsia Molodizhne	1–2	0–0	0–0	1–0	2–1	3–0	0–1	4–1		0–1	2–1	4–0	3–0	4–0	1–2	3–2	3–2	1–1
FC Lviv	0–0	2–0	3–0	3–0	3–1	1–0	1–0	2–1	3–1		2–0	3–0	1–2	4–0	0–1 (Note: Match on March 14 FC Lviv – PFC Sevastopol was not played due to the condition of the pitch. The Disciplinary Committee of the PFL awarded a 3–0 technical victory to PFC Sevastopol. (21 April 2010) However, with PFC Sevastapol's agreement the league decided to play the fixture on 2 June 2010.)	3–2	0–1	2–1
Naftovyk-Ukrnafta Okhtyrka	2–1	0–0	2–2	1–0	1–0	3–1	2–0	2–1	1–0	2–0		3–0	0–1	1–1	0–1	1–2	2–3	2–1
Nyva Ternopil	0–1	0–1	2–0	0–1	2–2	1–2	1–2	1–0	0–1	0–4	0–4		0–2	1–0	0–2	0–3	1–2	1–1
FC Oleksandriya	5–1	1–1	2–1	2–1	4–1	2–1	3–2	5–0	0–3	0–0	0–0	3–0		4–0	2–1	1–2	0–1	1–1
Prykarpattya Ivano-Frankivsk	2–0	0–1	1–2	1–0	0–1	2–0	0–2	1–1	0–1	0–0	3–3	1–1	0–2		0–1	2–2	0–2	0–1
Sevastopol	2–0	1–0	2–0	5–0	4–0	3–1	4–2	1–0	3–2	1–0	2–0	3–1	1–0	3–0		3–4	1–1	4–0
Stal Alchevsk	1–1	3–0 (Note: Round 33 match between Stal Alchevsk and Desna Chernihiv did not take place due to Desna not arriving to play. PFL awards a 3–0 technical victory to Stal Alchevsk.)	1–0	1–0	0–0	3–1	3–0	2–1	0–0	0–2	0–1	1–0	2–1	2–0	2–1		0–1	3–3
Volyn Lutsk	3–2	2–1	3–0	1–1	4–1	4–0	4–0	2–0	0–0	0–0	1–0	2–1	1–3	5–1	2–1	1–1		4–0
Zirka Kirovohrad	1–1	2–0	1–2	0–1	2–1	2–0	1–1	2–2	2–1	0–1	1–1	3–1	0–2	0–3	0–0	1–0	2–2	

Updated to match(es) played on June 10, 2010. Source: PFL Persha Liha Calendar
Legend: Blue = home team win; Yellow = draw; Red = away team win.

== Top scorers ==
	Scorer	Goals (Pen.)	Team
1	(Ukraine) Serhiy Kucherenko	19 (3)	Krymteplitsia Molodizhne
2	(Ukraine) Yuriy Pleshakov	17	PFC Sevastopol
3	(Ukraine) Valentyn Poltavets	15 (5)	Dnister Ovidiopol
4	(Ukraine) Serhiy Hrybanov	14 (3)	Desna Chernihiv
5	(Brazil) Maicon	13 (3)	Volyn Lutsk
6	(Ukraine) Andriy Shevchuk	12 (4)	PFC Sevastopol
7	(Ukraine) Yevhen Pavlov	11	Volyn Lutsk
7	(Ivory Coast) Souleymane Diaby	11	Krymteplitsia Molodizhne
7	(Ukraine) Oleksandr Mandzyuk	11 (1)	FC Lviv
10	(Ukraine) Anton Mukhovykov	10	Stal Alchevsk

== Managers ==
Club	Coach	Replaced coach
Arsenal Bila Tserkva	(Ukraine) Ihor Artymovych	
Desna Chernihiv	(Ukraine) Oleksandr Ryabokon	
Dniester Ovidiopol	(Ukraine) Andriy Parkhomenko	
Dynamo-2 Kyiv	(Ukraine) Hennadiy Lytovchenko	
Enerhetyk Burshtyn	(Ukraine) Mykola Prystay	
Feniks-Illichovets Kalinine	(Ukraine) Ivan Maruschak	
Helios Kharkiv	(Ukraine) Serhiy Kandaurov	
FC Kharkiv	(Ukraine) Rinat Morozov	(Ukraine) Mykhaylo Stelmakh
Krymteplitsia Molodizhne	(Ukraine) Oleksandr Sevidov	(Russia) Gennady Morozov
FC Lviv	(Ukraine) Viktor Ryashko (caretaker)	(Lithuania) Algimantas Liubinskas (Ukraine) Ihor Yavorskyi (Ukraine) Yuriy Benyo (Ukraine) Vyacheslav Mavrov
Naftovyk-Ukrnafta Okhtyrka	(Ukraine) Serhiy Shevchenko	(Ukraine) Valeriy Horodov
Nyva Ternopil	(Ukraine) Ihor Biskup (interim)	(Ukraine) Viktor Ryashko
PFC Oleksandria	(Ukraine) Volodymyr Sharan	(Ukraine) Serhiy Kovalets (Ukraine) Yuriy Koval
Prykarpattya Ivano-Frankivsk	(Ukraine) Serhiy Ptashnyk	
PFC Sevastopol	(Ukraine) Oleh Leschynskyi	
Stal Alchevsk	(Ukraine) Anatoliy Volobuyev	(Ukraine) Vadym Plotnikov
Volyn Lutsk	(Ukraine) Vitaliy Kvartsyanyi	
Zirka Kirovohrad	(Ukraine) Ihor Zhabchenko	

== Managerial changes ==
Team	Outgoing head coach	Manner of departure	Date of vacancy	Table	Incoming head coach	Date of appointment
Krymteplitsia	(Ukraine) Mykhaylo Sachko	Contract expired	15 July 2009	Pre-season	(Russia) Gennady Morozov	15 July 2009
Desna	(Ukraine) Mykhaylo Dunets	Contract expired	17 July 2009	Pre-season	(Ukraine) Oleksandr Ryabokon	17 July 2009
Naftovyk-Ukrnafta	(Ukraine) Valeriy Horodov	Mutual consent	5 August 2009		(Ukraine) Serhiy Shevchenko	5 August 2009
FC Lviv	(Ukraine) Yuri Benio	Mutual consent	8 August 2009	5	(Ukraine) Vyacheslav Mavrov (caretaker)	8 August 2009
FC Lviv	(Ukraine) Vyacheslav Mavrov (caretaker)	Interim manager	19 August 2009	5	(Ukraine) Ihor Yavorsky	19 August 2009
PFC Oleksandria	(Ukraine) Yuriy Koval	Mutual consent	28 August 2009	10	(Ukraine) Serhiy Kovalets	28 August 2009
Krymteplitsia	(Russia) Gennady Morozov	Mutual consent	20 October 2009	12	(Ukraine) Oleksandr Sevidov	20 October 2009
FC Stal Alchevsk	(Ukraine) Vadym Plotnikov	Mutual consent	5 November 2009	4	(Ukraine) Anatoliy Volobuyev	5 November 2009
FC Lviv	(Ukraine) Ihor Yavorsky	Dismissed	10 November 2009	2	(Lithuania) Algimantas Liubinskas	1 January 2010
PFC Oleksandria	(Ukraine) Serhiy Kovalets	Leaves for Obolon	12 January 2010	6	(Ukraine) Volodymyr Sharan	31 January 2010
Nyva	(Ukraine) Viktor Ryashko	Leaves for FC Lviv	11 March 2010	17	(Ukraine) Ihor Biskup (interim)	11 March 2010
FC Kharkiv	(Ukraine) Mykhaylo Stelmakh	Sacked	18 April 2010	18	(Ukraine) Rinat Morozov	18 April 2010
FC Lviv	(Lithuania) Algimantas Liubinskas	Mutual terms	19 April 2010	2	(Ukraine) Viktor Ryashko (caretaker)	19 April 2010

=== Stadiums ===
The following stadiums were used during the season.

Rank	Stadium	Capacity	Club	Notes
1	Zirka Stadium, Kirovohrad	13,667	Zirka Kirovohrad	
2	Labor Reserve, Bila Tserkva	13,500	Arsenal Bila Tserkva	With stadium under construction capacity is reduced to 5,000.
3	Avanhard Stadium, Lutsk	12,080	Volyn Lutsk	
4	Yuriy Haharyn Stadium, Chernihiv	12,060	Desna Chernihiv	
5	City Stadium, Ternopil	11,300	Nyva Ternopil	
6	Stal Stadium, Alchevsk	8,632	Stal Alchevsk	
7	MCS Rukh, Ivano-Frankivsk	6,500	Prykarpattya Ivano-Frankivsk	
8	KSC Nika, Oleksandria	5,692	PFC Oleksandria	
9	Naftovyk Stadium, Okhtyrka	5,256	Naftovyk-Ukrnafta Okhtyrka	
10	Druzhba Stadium, Bakhchisaray, Crimea	4,500	PFC Sevastopol	Temporary home stadium used by Sevastopol in the first half of the season
11	SK Sevastopol, Sevastopol, Crimea	3,500	PFC Sevastopol	Return to their home stadium after the winter break
12	ST Sport Arena, Ahrarne, Crimea	3,250	Krymteplitsia Molodizhne	
13	Kniazha Arena, Dobromyl	3,220	FC Lviv	
14	Central Stadium, Makariv, Kyiv Oblast	3,100	Arsenal Bila Tserkva	Club forced to play away from home due to construction. (Note: Arsenal Bila Tserkva played three home games at Central Stadium, Makariv, Kyiv Oblast – Round 21, 23 and 25.)
15	Enerhetyk Stadium, Burshtyn	3,000	Enerhetyk Burshtyn	
16	Dynamo Stadium, Kharkiv	2,500	FC Kharkiv	
17	Sport Complex Obukhivsky Raion, Obukhiv, Kyiv Oblast	2,064	Arsenal Bila Tserkva	Club forced to play away from home due to state of home ground pitch. (Note: Arsenal Bila Tserkva played their Round 28, 32 and 34 games at SCOR Stadium, Obukhiv, Kyiv Oblast)
18	Helios Arena, Kharkiv	2,057	Helios Kharkiv	
19	Dukov Dniester Stadium, Ovidiopol	1,500	Dniester Ovidiopol	
20	Arsenal-Spartak Stadium, Kharkiv (Note: Arsenal-Spartak Stadium (home ground of FC Arsenal Kharkiv) is an all weather stadium with artificial turf.)	1,500	FC Kharkiv	Used as temporary home ground after the winter break because of weather conditions.
21	Stadium Yunist, Kalinino, Crimea	1,050	Feniks-Illichovets Kalinine	
22	Dynamo Club Stadium, Chapayevka	750	Dynamo-2 Kyiv; Desna Chernihiv; Arsenal Bila Tserkva	Used as temporary home ground for Desna and Arsenal because of weather conditions. (Note: Weather conditions in March forced the PFL to reschedule home games for Arsenal and Desna to Dynamo Training Center which has an artificial pitch. On March 24, three games from Round 19 were played at the complex in one day, including a home game for Dynamo-2.)
23	YFA Sport Club Metalist Stadium (Note: Youth Football Academy Sport Club Metalist Stadium is a sporting complex that has an artificial turf pitch.), Kharkiv	400	Helios Kharkiv	Used as temporary home ground after the winter break because of weather conditions.

== See also ==
- 2009–10 Ukrainian Premier League
- 2009–10 Ukrainian Second League
