= List of football stadiums in Ukraine =

The Olympic National Sports Complex Stadium in Kyiv

Construction and exploitation of stadiums and other football infrastructure in Ukraine as well as providing safety in conducting competitions is supervised by the respected UAF (previously FFU) standing committee. The Ukrainian Association of Football itself adopts regulations on infrastructure of stadiums and measures of safety.

Previously all stadiums in Ukraine were awarded a certain category: 1, 2, 3, and elite. All professional clubs are obligated to conduct their "home games" in place of their permanent location and state registration and at stadiums that correspond to the FFU regulations. A football game is held only at a stadium that was applied by the club during its attestation for respectful competition season. Such stadiums are listed in a stadium registry on which permitted to conduct matches of respected level. Each stadium has a certificate of state commission and passport.

In 2020, the UAF revamped its stadium categorization to synchronize with the same requirements as the UEFA. It published a new list of stadiums and its categorization.

== Current stadiums with a capacity of at least 10,000 ==
#	Stadium	Capacity	City	Home team	Opened
1	Olympic National Sports Complex	70,050	Kyiv	FC Dynamo Kyiv	
2	Donbas Arena	52,518	Donetsk		
3	Metalist Sports Complex	41,307	Kharkiv	FC Metalist Kharkiv	
4	Arena Lviv	34,915	Lviv		
5	Chornomorets Stadium	34,164	Odesa	FC Chornomorets Odesa	
6	Shakhtar Stadium	31,718	Donetsk		2000
7	Dnipro Arena	31,003	Dnipro	Dnipro 1	
8	Ukraina Stadium	27,925	Lviv	FC Karpaty Lviv	2000
9	RSC Olimpiyskiy	26,100	Donetsk		2003
10	Yuvileiny Stadium	25,830	Sumy	FC Viktoriya Sumy	
11	Butovsky Vorskla Stadium	24,795	Poltava	FC Vorskla Poltava	2000
12	Meteor Stadium	24,381	Dnipro	FC VPK-Ahro Shevchenkivka	2001
13	Avanhard Stadium	22,320	Luhansk		2003
14	RSC Lokomotiv	19,978	Simferopol		2004
15	Shukhevych City Stadium	15,150	Ternopil	FC Nyva Ternopil	2011
16	Lobanovskyi Dynamo Stadium	16,873	Kyiv		
17	Tsentralnyi City Stadium	15,600	Mykolaiv	MFC Mykolaiv	2019
18	Berezkin Zirka Stadium	13,305	Kropyvnytskyi	FC Zirka Kropyvnytskyi	2014
19	Boiko Stadium	12,680	Mariupol	FC Mariupol	2001
20	Avanhard Stadium	12,080	Lutsk	FC Volyn Lutsk	2015
21	Chernihiv Training Center	12,060	Chernihiv	FC Desna Chernihiv	
22	Avanhard Stadium	12,000	Uzhhorod	FC Uzhhorod	2005
23	Bukovyna Stadium	12,000	Chernivtsi	FSC Bukovyna Chernivtsi	
24	Slavutych Arena	11,983	Zaporizhzhia	FC Metalurh Zaporizhzhia	2006
25	Cherkasy Arena	10,321	Cherkasy	LNZ Cherkasy	2011

=== Football stadiums with a capacity of at least 15,000 (under Russian occupation) ===
#	Stadium	Capacity	City	Home team	Built/renovated
1	Donbas Arena	52,518	Donetsk	FC Shakhtar Donetsk	2009
2	Shakhtar Stadium	31,718	Donetsk		2000
3	RSK Olimpiyskyi	26,100	Donetsk		2003
4	Avanhard Stadium	22,320	Luhansk	FC Zorya Luhansk	2003
5	Lokomotiv Stadium	19,978	Simferopol	SC Tavriya Simferopol	2004

== List by UAF categories ==
The following is a list of football stadiums in Ukraine, ordered by capacity.

=== Category Four ===
Any games (domestic and international)

#	Image	Stadium	Capacity	City	Home team	Opened
1		Olimpiyskiy Sports Complex	70,050	Kyiv	Ukraine; Dynamo Kyiv; Shakhtar Donetsk	1923
2		Metalist Sports Complex	41,307	Kharkiv	Metalist Kharkiv; Metalist 1925 Kharkiv	1926
3		Arena Lviv	34,915	Lviv	Rukh Lviv	2011
4		Chornomorets Stadium	34,164	Odesa	Chornomorets Odesa	1936
5		Dnipro-Arena	31,003	Dnipro	Dnipro-1	1939
6		Butovsky Vorskla Stadium	24,795	Poltava	Vorskla Poltava	1951
7		Slavutych-Arena	11,983	Zaporizhzhia	Metalurh Zaporizhzhia; Zorya Luhansk	1938

=== Category Three ===
Any domestic games (UPL, finals of Cup or Super Cup)

#	Image	Stadium	Capacity	City	Home team	Opened
1		Ukraina Stadium	28,051	Lviv	Karpaty Lviv	1963
2		Meteor Stadium	24,381	Dnipro	VPK-Ahro Shevchenkivka	1966
3		Shukhevych Ternopil City Stadium	15,150	Ternopil	Nyva Ternopil	1909
4		Lobanovsky Dynamo Stadium	16,873	Kyiv	Ukraine Under-21	1933
5		Tsentralnyi City Stadium	15,600	Mykolaiv	Mykolaiv	1965
7		Berezkin Zirka Stadium	13,305	Kropyvnytskyi	Zirka Kropyvnytskyi	1934
8		Volodymyr Boiko Stadium	12,680	Mariupol	Mariupol	1956
11		Avanhard Stadium	12,080	Lutsk	Volyn Lutsk	1960
9		Chernihiv Training Center	12,060	Chernihiv	Ukraine; Desna Chernihiv	1936
10		Avanhard Stadium	12,000	Uzhhorod	Uzhhorod	1953
11		Cherkasy Arena	10,321	Cherkasy	Dnipro Cherkasy	1957
12		Nika Sports Complex	7,000	Oleksandriia	Oleksandriya	1998
13		Obolon Arena	5,100	Kyiv	Obolon Kyiv	2002
14		Kolos Stadium	5,000	Kovalivka	Kolos Kovalivka	2014

=== Category Two ===
Any domestic games beside the UPL, Super Cup or Cup competitions quarter, semi or finals.

#	Image	Stadium	Capacity	City	Home team	Opened
1		Yuvileiny Stadium	25,830	Sumy	Sumy; Alians Lypova Dolyna	1949
2		Bukovyna Stadium	12,000	Chernivtsi	Bukovyna Chernivtsi	1956
3		Bliuminh Stadium	8,000	Kramatorsk	Kramatorsk	1937
4		Podillia Stadium	6,800	Khmelnytskyi	Podillia Khmelnytskyi	1950
5		Rukh Stadium	6,500	Ivano-Frankivsk	Prykarpattia Ivano-Frankivsk	1909
6		Prapor Stadium	6,000	Kramatorsk	Kramatorsk	1936
7		Naftovyk Stadium	5,256	Okhtyrka	Naftovyk Okhtyrka	
8		Park Peremohy Stadium	5,000	Mykolaiv	Mykolaiv-2	
9		Soniachny Stadium	4,924	Kharkiv	Zhytlobud-2	2011
10		Skif Sports Complex	3,742	Lviv	Rukh Lviv Under-21	1897
11		Yunist Stadium	3,000	Chernihiv	Yunist Chernihiv; Yunist ShVSM	1975
12		Yunist Stadium	2,700	Volochysk	Ahrobiznes Volchysk	1980
13		Yunist Stadium	2,500	Horishni Plavni	Hirnyk Sport Horishni Plavni	
14		Inhulets Stadium	1,869	Petrove	Inhulets Petrove	2014
15		Bannikov Training Complex	1,678	Kyiv	Arsenal Kyiv; Olimpik Donetsk; Ukraine Under-19	2005
16		Babaiev Kremin Arena	1,566	Kremenchuk	Kremin Kremenchuk	2010
17		Livyi Bereh Stadium	1,372	Kyiv	Livyi Bereh Kyiv	2020
18		Mynai Arena	1,312	Mynai	Mynai	2018

=== Category One ===
Any games beside the UPL, First League, or Cup competitions (main stages, 1/8+ finals), including certified training fields

#	Image	Stadium	Capacity	City	Home team	Opened
1		Tsentralnyi City Stadium	14,000	Vinnytsia	Nyva Vinnytsia	1949
2		Trudovi Rezervy Base	13,500	Bila Tserkva	—	1922
3		Dynamo Stadium	8,000	Kharkiv	—	1931
4		Tsentralnyi Stadium	7,552	Uman	Pantery Uman	1922
5		Elektrometalurh Stadium	7,200	Nikopol	Nikopol	
6		ZAZ Stadium	6,619	Zaporizhzhia	Zorya Luhansk Under-21	
7		Sokil Stadium	6,000	Stryi	Skala Stryi	
8		Kolos Stadium	5,654	Boryspil	—	1935
9		Illichivets Sports Complex	5,600	Mariupol	Avanhard Kramatorsk	2007
10		Spartak Stadium	4,800	Odesa	—	1928
11		Enerhiya Stadium	4,000	Nova Kakhovka	Enerhiya Nova Kakhovka	1954
12		Olimp Sports Complex	4,000	Oleksandriia	Oleksandriya Under-21	1991
13		Kolos Stadium	3,800	Berezne	Sluch Berezne	
14		Lokomotyv Stadium	3,700	Poltava	Poltava	1937
15		Krystal Stadium	3,400	Kherson	Krystal Kherson	1962
16		Nyva Sports Complex	3,282	Vinnytsia	Nyva Vinnytsia	2010
17		Brukvenko Tsentralnyi Stadium	3,100	Makariv	Chaika Petropavlivska Borshchahivka	1985
18		Zakhidnyi Stadium	3,063	Mariupol	Yarud Mariupol	2005
19		Enerhetyk Stadium	3,000	Burshtyn	Karpaty Halych	1976
20		Izotop Stadium	3,000	Varash	Izotop Varash	1979
21		Spartak Stadium	3,000	Korosten	Korosten	
22		Kolos Stadium	2,500	Dunaivtsi	Epitsentr Dunaivtsi	
23		Malva Stadium	2,500	Chernivtsi	Bukovynska Nadiia	1923
24		Nova Bavaria Stadium	2,500	Kharkiv	Zhytlobud-2 Kharkiv	
25		Hirnyk Stadium	2,500	Kryvyi Rih	Kryvbas Kryvyi Rih	1956
26		Temp Stadium	2,400	Kyiv	Zirka Kyiv	1955
27		Melnyk Tsentralnyi Stadium	2,064	Obukhiv	—	
28		Avanhard Stadium	2,059	Zmiiv	Zhytlobud-1 Kharkiv	
29		Borys Tropanets Stadium	1,854	Kamchyk	Balkany Kamchyk	2015
30		Azovets Stadium	1,660	Mariupol	Mariupol Under-21	
31		Olimpiyskyi Stadium	1,540	Kakhovka	Kakhovka	
32		Kolos Stadium	1,500	Volia	Kolos Nikopol	
33		Lokomotyv Stadium	1,500	Rava-Ruska	Karpaty Lviv Under-21	
34		Shkoliar Stadium	1,500	Lviv	DYuSShOR No.4	1924
35		Mashynobudivnyk Stadium	1,300	Karlivka	Karlivka	
36		Zatys Stadium	1,250	Hornostaivka	Myr Hornostayivka	1950
37		Spartak Arena	1,242	Zhytomyr	Polissia Zhytomyr	1923
38		Ivan Sports Complex	1,200	Odesa	Real Pharma Odesa	
39		Volodymyr Kuts Stadium	1,129	Trostianets	Trostianets	
40		Yuvileinyi Stadium	1,028	Bucha	Obolon-2 Bucha	2001
41		Chempion Central City Stadium	1,000	Irpin	—	
44		Enerhetyk Stadium	1,000	Dobrotvir	Lviv Under-21	
42		Kniazha Arena	1,000	Shchaslyve	Rubikon Kyiv; Shakhtar Donetsk Under-21	2007
43		Medyk Stadium	1,000	Morshyn	—	
44		Pidshypnyk Stadium	1,000	Lutsk	Volyn-2 Lutsk	
45		Sokil Stadium	1,000	Lviv	—	
46		Zoria Stadium	1,000	Biloziria	Cherkashchyna; Zorya-Akademia Bilozirya	2012

== List of uncertified football stadiums ==
=== Others ===
Non certified sports facilities

#	Stadium	Capacity	City	Home team	Opened
1	SKA Stadium	23,040	Lviv	—	1967
2	Peremoha Stadium	15,600	Kamianske	SC Prometei	1955
3	SKA Stadium	15,000	Odesa	—	1966
4	CSK ZSU Stadium	12,000	Kyiv	FC Arsenal Kyiv academy	1967
5	Politechnik Stadium	11,400	Kremenchuk	—	
6	Central Stadium	6,500	Zhytomyr	FC Polissia Zhytomyr	2021
7	Lafort Arena	3,220	Dobromyl	—	2007
8	Tekstylnyk Stadium	2,000	Chernihiv	WFC Lehenda-ShVSM Chernihiv	

=== The UAF notable stadiums located in the Russian occupied territories ===
Sports facilities with unidentified status

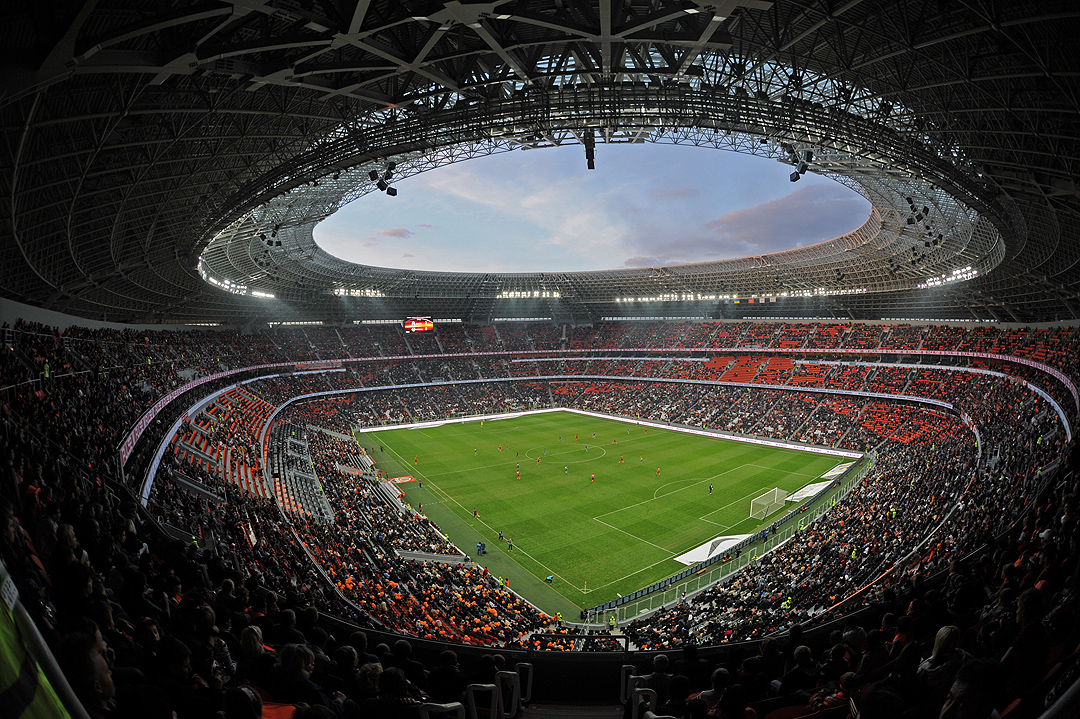
The Donbas Arena in Donetsk

#	Stadium	Capacity	Opened	City	Home team
1	Donbas Arena	52,518	2009	Donetsk	FC Shakhtar Donetsk
2	Shakhtar Stadium	31,718	2000	Donetsk	FC Shakhtar Donetsk junior squads and academy
3	RSK Olimpiyskyi	26,100	2003	Donetsk	—
4	Avanhard Stadium	22,320	2003	Luhansk	FC Zorya Luhansk
5	Lokomotiv Republican Sports Complex	19,978	2004	Simferopol	SC Tavriya Simferopol
6	Stal Stadium	9,200		Alchevsk	FC Stal Alchevsk
7	Sevastopol Sports Complex	5,826	2011	Sevastopol	FC Sevastopol
8	Metalurh Stadium	5,094	2008	Donetsk	FC Metalurh Donetsk
9	Fiolent Stadium	5,000	2005	Simferopol	FC Ihroservice Simferopol
10	Olimpik Sports Complex	4,500	2014	Donetsk	FC Olimpik Donetsk

== List by regions/oblasts ==
- Autonomous Republic of Crimea: none available
- Cherkasy Oblast: Cherkasy Arena (Tsentralnyi Stadion (Cherkasy), cat 3), Central Stadium, Uman (cat 1), Zoria Stadium, Biloziria (cat 1)
- Chernihiv Oblast: Chernihiv Stadium (cat 3), Yunist Stadium (Chernihiv) (cat 2), Chernihiv Arena (cat 1)
- Chernivtsi Oblast: Bukovyna Stadium (cat 2), Malva Stadium (cat 1)
- Dnipropetrovsk Oblast: Dnipro-Arena (cat 4), Meteor Stadium (cat 3), Dnipro Training Center, indoor field (cat 1), Olimpiyski Rezervy Stadium (cat 1), Shakhta Zhovtneva Stadium (cat 1), Elektrometalurh Stadium (cat 1), Kolos Stadium, Chkalove (cat 1)
- Donetsk Oblast: Volodymyr Boiko Stadium, Mariupol (cat 3), Bliuminh Stadium, Kramatorsk (cat 2), Prapor Stadium (Kramatorsk) (cat 2), Sportkompleks Illichivets, Mariupol (cat 1), Zakhidnyi Stadium, Mariupol (cat 1), Azovets Stadium, Mariupol (cat 1), Mariupol Training Center (cat 1)
- Ivano-Frankivsk Oblast: MCS Rukh (cat 2), Enerhetyk Stadium, Burshtyn (cat 1)
- Kharkiv Oblast: Metalist Stadium (cat 4), Sonyachny Stadium, Kharkiv (cat 2), Dynamo Stadium (Kharkiv) (cat 1), Nova Bavaria Stadium, Kharkiv (cat 1), Metalist Training Center, Vysokyi (cat 1), Avanhard Stadium, Zmiiv (cat 1)
- Kherson Oblast: Olimpiyskyi Stadium, Kakhovka (cat 1), Krystal Stadium, Kherson (cat 1), Enerhiya Stadium, Nova Kakhovka (cat 1), Marianivskyi Stadium (cat 1), Zatys Stadium, Hornostaivka (cat 1)
- Khmelnytskyi Oblast: Sport Complex Podillya (cat 2), Yunist Stadium, Volochysk (cat 2), Kolos Stadium, Dunaivtsi (cat 1)
- Kyiv City and Oblast: Olimpiyskiy National Sports Complex (cat 4), Lobanovsky Dynamo Stadium (cat 3), Obolon Arena (cat 3), Kolos Stadium (Kovalivka) (cat 3), Bannikov Stadium (cat 2), Livyi Bereh Stadium (cat 2), Trudovi Rezervy Stadium, Bila Tserkva (cat 1), Temp Stadium, Kyiv (cat 1), Dynamo Training Center, indoor (cat 1), Dynamo Training Center, pitch #6 (cat 1), Dynamo Training Center, pitch #7 (cat 1), Kolos Stadium (Boryspil) (cat 1), Yuvileinyi Stadium, Bucha (cat 1), Central City Stadium, Irpin (cat 1), Central Stadium, Kalynivka (cat 1), Brukvenko Central Stadium, Makariv (cat 1), Volodymyr Melnyk Stadium, Obukhiv (cat 1), Arsenal Arena, Shchaslyve (cat 1), Dinaz Stadium, Demydiv (cat 1)
- Kirovohrad Oblast: Zirka Stadium (cat 3), CSC Nika Stadium (cat 3), Inhulets Stadium (cat 2), Oleksandr Povorozniuk Stadium (cat 1), HOLovkivskyi Stadium (cat 1), Olimp Stadium (cat 1)
- Luhansk Oblast: none available
- Lviv Oblast: Arena Lviv (cat 4), Ukraina Stadium (cat 3), Skif Stadium (cat 2), Shkoliar Stadium (cat 1), Sokil Stadium, Lviv (cat 1), Sokil Stadium, Stryi (cat 1), Lokomotyv Stadium, Rava-Ruska (cat 1), Enerhetyk Stadium, Dobrotvir (cat 1), Stadion imeni Bohdana Markevycha (cat 1), Medyk Stadium (cat 1)
- Mykolaiv Oblast: Tsentralnyi Stadion (Mykolaiv) (cat 3), Park Peremohy Stadium (cat 2), Tsentralnyi Stadion (Mykolaiv), upper pitch (cat 1)
- Odesa Oblast: Chornomorets Stadium (cat 4), Spartak Stadium (Odesa) (cat 1), Borys Tropanets Stadium (cat 1), Ivan Stadium (cat 1), Liustdorf Stadium (cat 1)
- Poltava Oblast: Oleksiy Butovsky Vorskla Stadium (cat 4), Kremin Stadium (cat 2), Yunist Stadium (Horishni Plavni) (cat 2), Vorskla-Zmina Stadium (cat 1), Ltava Stadium (cat 1), Lokomotyv Stadium (Poltava) (cat 1), Mashynobudivnyk Stadium (cat 1)
- Rivne Oblast: Kolos Stadium, Mlyniv (cat 2), Kolos Stadium, Berezne (cat 1), Izotop Stadium (cat 1)
- Sumy Oblast: Naftovyk Stadium (cat 2), Yuvileiny Stadium (cat 2), Alians-Arena (cat 1), Viktoriya Stadium (cat 1), Kuts Stadium (cat 1)
- Ternopil Oblast: Ternopilsky Misky Stadion (cat 3)
- Vinnytsia Oblast: Tsentralnyi Stadion (Vinnytsia) (cat 1), Sports Complex Nyva (cat 1)
- Volyn Oblast: Avanhard Stadium (Lutsk) (cat 3), Pidshypnyk Stadium (cat 1)
- Zakarpattia Oblast: Avanhard Stadium (Uzhhorod) (cat 3), Mynai Arena (cat 2)
- Zaporizhzhia Oblast: Slavutych Arena (cat 4), JSC ZAZ Stadium (cat 1), Metalurh Training Center (cat 1)
- Zhytomyr Oblast: Spartak Arena (cat 1), Central City Stadium Spartak (cat 1)

== Gallery ==
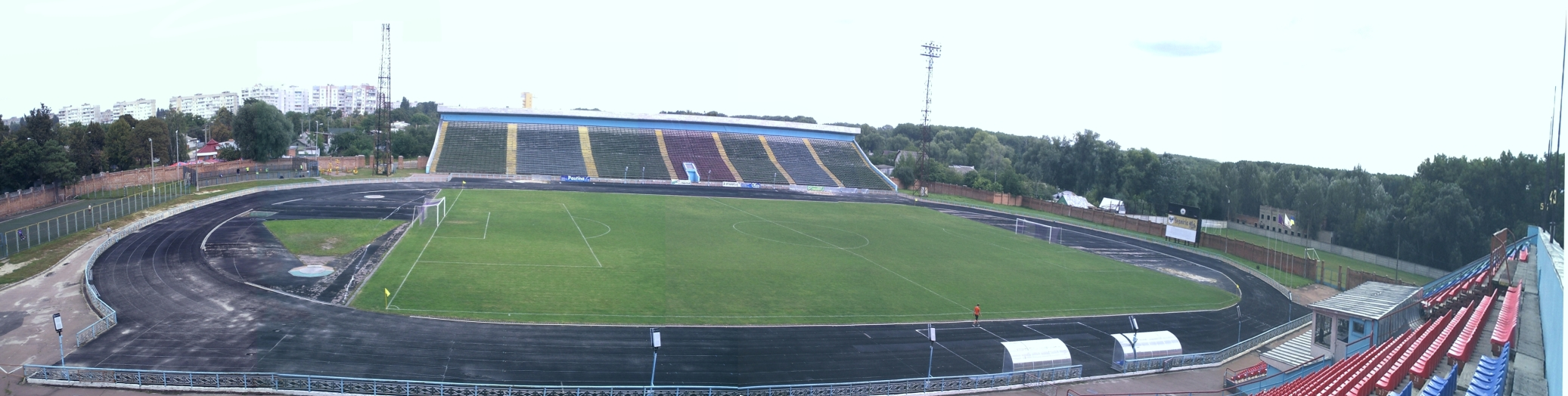
Stadion Yuri Gagarin in Chernihiv

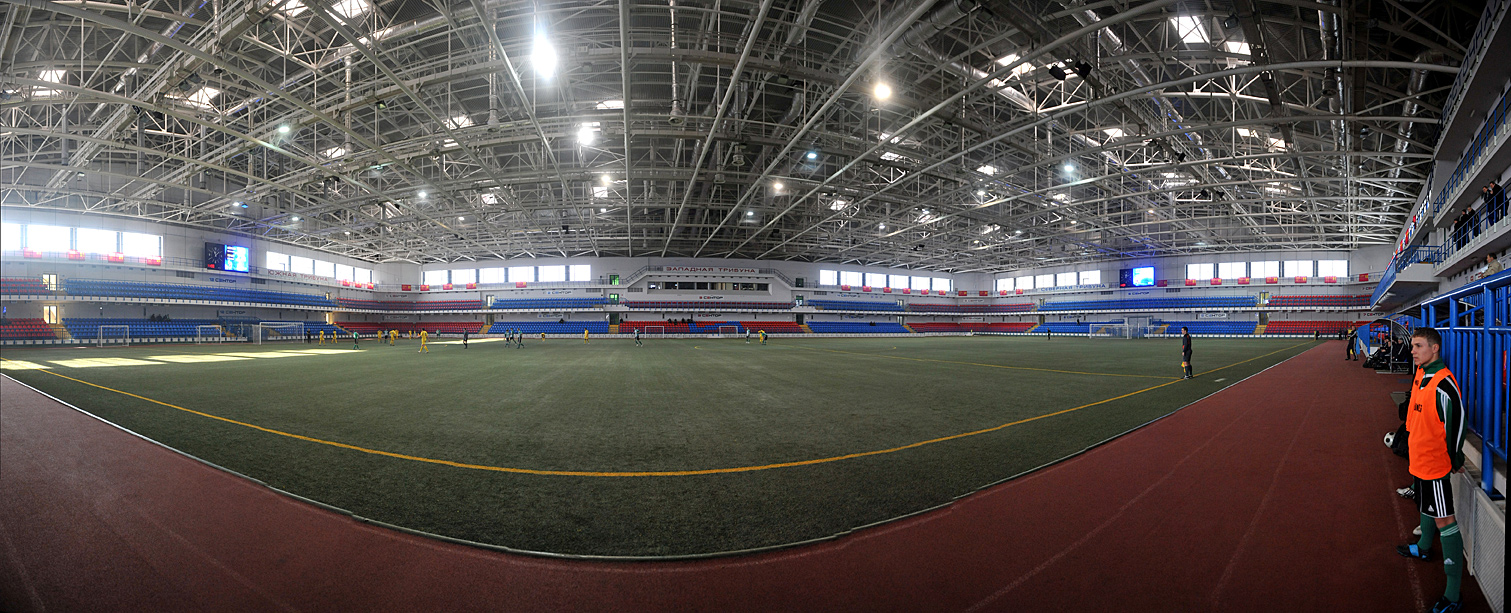
Illichivets Sports Complex indoor field

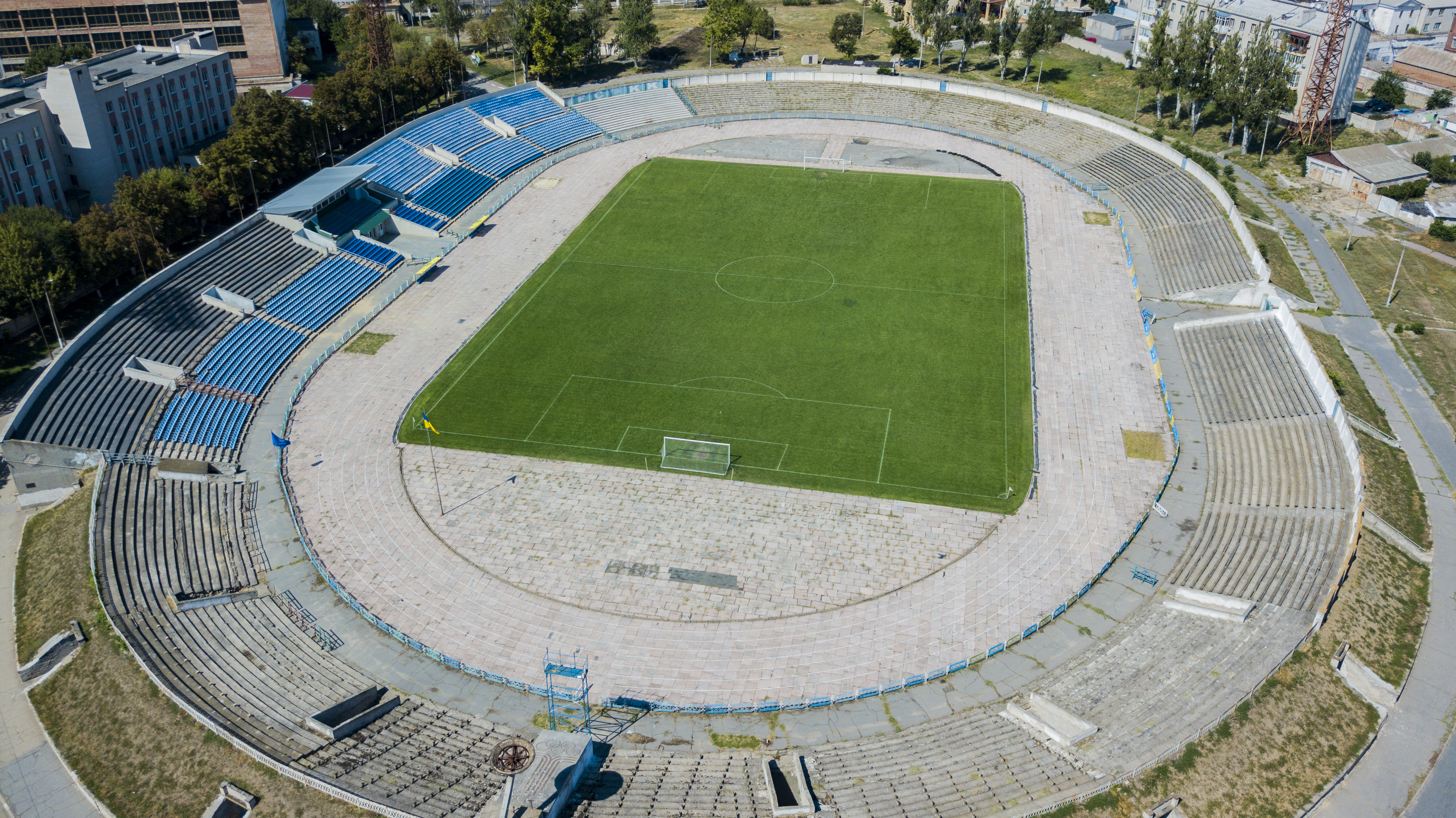
Krystal Stadium

== The UAF stadium basic requirements ==
Categories to all UAF stadiums are granted with consideration of all circumstances and data about a stadium and if it corresponds to FIFA, UEFA and UAF requirements (2020 UAF Regulations on stadium infrastructure. Article 3.2).

Basic criteria for each stadium (2020 UAF Regulations on stadium infrastructure. Article 3.7):

- must have developed and approved in the manner prescribed by law a strategy of insuring a public order and public safety, rules (instructions) of observance of public order and public safety (including rules of spectator behavior), evacuation plan
- must have rooms (no less than two) functioning as a post of urgent or first medical aid with the necessary equipment and easy access from the building premises and the surrounding area
- must provide a clear distribution of seats for spectators into separate parts (sectors)
- must have a separate box (lounge) for honored guests (Luxury box) with a separate entrance
- must be equipped with a video surveillance system over the territory of the structure and adjacent territories as well as technical measures of recording the results of video surveillance
- must be equipped with a public announcement
- must be equipped with a control room with the ability to control the video surveillance system, telephone signal and loud speaking systems
- must be equipped with information screen and stands with rules of spectator behavior, evacuation plan (in state and most common foreign language)
- must provide routes for special equipment, including vehicles of the National Police, ambulance and the State Service of Emergency Situations units, as well as places for their parking
- must have the equipment necessary to use an electronic ticket, including a turnstile system
- must have storage rooms or storage chambers for items prohibited for carrying into the building, in case of their seizure
- must have rooms for FIFA, UEFA, UAF official representatives and supervisor in refereeing (officials)
- must have a room for the National Police operations and a separate room for temporary detention of offenders during a football match
- must have premises for the coordination headquarters
- must be equipped with serviceable fire protection systems, fire barriers, primary fire extinguishing measures, standard number of sources of fire water supply, lightning protection and safety signs

In order to ensure public order and public safety in accordance with the law, other criteria may also be established for sports facilities.

== See also ==
- List of European stadiums by capacity
- List of association football stadiums by capacity
- List of association football stadiums by country
- List of sports venues by capacity
- List of stadiums by capacity
- Lists of stadiums
