= 2008–09 Ukrainian Premier League =

18th season of top-tier football league in Vyshcha Liha

Ukrainian Premier League
- Season: 2008–09
- Champions: Dynamo Kyiv; 13th title
- Relegated: FC Lviv; FC Kharkiv
- Champions League: Dynamo Kyiv; Shakhtar Donetsk
- Europa League: Metalist Kharkiv; Metalurh Donetsk; Vorskla Poltava (via Ukrainian Cup)
- Matches: 240
- Goals: 551 (2.3 per match)
- Top goalscorer: Oleksandr Kovpak (17) (Tavriya Simferopol)
- Longest winning run: Dynamo Kyiv (10)
- Longest unbeaten run: Shakhtar Donetsk (15)
- Longest losing run: FC Kharkiv (8)

The 2008–09 Ukrainian Premier League season was the eighteenth since its establishment. The league was restructured and split off from the Professional Football League of Ukraine. It was officially named as the EpiCentre Championship of Ukraine in football.

Shakhtar Donetsk were the defending champions of the past season, having won their fourth league title. The season began on 16 July 2008 with a scoreless draw between Tavriya Simferopol and Dnipro Dnipropetrovsk. The last round of matches were played on 26 May 2009. A total of 16 teams participated in the league, 14 of which had contested in the 2007–08 season, and two of which were promoted from the Persha Liha.

Vorskla Poltava's Ahmed Januzi scored the first goal of the tournament on 18 July 2008 in the 72nd minute of an away match against FC Kharkiv. Dynamo Kyiv won their title several games before the end of the season after a home win against Tavriya Simferopol. Dynamo finished with a 15-point lead over the defending champions and current runners-up Shakhtar Donetsk.

== Teams ==
=== Promoted ===
- FC Illichivets Mariupol, champion of the 2007–08 Ukrainian First League – (returning after absence of a season)
- FC Lviv, runner-up of the 2007–08 Ukrainian First League – (debut)

=== Location map ===
Locations of team home grounds in Ukrainian Premier League 2008–09

== Managers and captains ==
Club	Coach	Captain	Replaced coach
Arsenal Kyiv	(Ukraine) Oleksandr Zavarov	(Ukraine) Vitaliy Reva	
Chornomorets Odesa	(Ukraine) Viktor Hryshko	(Ukraine) Vitaliy Rudenko	(Russia) Vitaly Shevchenko
Dnipro Dnipropetrovsk	(Ukraine) Volodymyr Bezsonov	(Ukraine) Andriy Rusol	(Ukraine) Oleh Protasov
Dynamo Kyiv	(Russia) Yury Syomin	(Morocco) Badr El Kaddouri	
Illichivets Mariupol	(Ukraine) Illya Blyznyuk	(Ukraine) Ihor Shukhovtsev	(Ukraine) Oleksandr Ishchenko
Karpaty Lviv	(Belarus) Oleg Kononov	(Ukraine) Serhiy Pshenychnykh	
FC Kharkiv	(Ukraine) Mykhailo Stelmakh	(Ukraine) Vitaliy Komarnytskyi	(Ukraine) Volodymyr Bezsonov
Kryvbas Kryvyi Rih	(Ukraine) Oleh Taran	(Albania) Dorian Bylykbashi	
FC Lviv	(Ukraine) Serhiy Kovalets	(Ukraine) Maryan Marushchak	(Ukraine) Stepan Yurchyshyn
Metalist Kharkiv	(Ukraine) Myron Markevych	(Ukraine) Oleksandr Horyainov	
Metalurh Donetsk	(Bulgaria) Nikolay Kostov	(Ukraine) Vyacheslav Checher	
Metalurh Zaporizhzhia	(Ukraine) Oleh Lutkov	(Ukraine) Oleksiy Hodin	(Ukraine) Anatoliy Chantsev
Shakhtar Donetsk	(Romania) Mircea Lucescu	(Croatia) Darijo Srna	
Tavriya Simferopol	(Ukraine) Serhiy Puchkov	(Ukraine) Oleksandr Kovpak	(Ukraine) Mykhaylo Fomenko
Vorskla Poltava	(Ukraine) Mykola Pavlov	(Ukraine) Hennadiy Medvedyev	
Zorya Luhansk	(Ukraine) Yuriy Dudnyk	(Ukraine) Oleksiy Khramtsov	(Ukraine) Anatoliy Volobuyev

=== Managerial changes ===
Team	Outgoing head coach	Manner of departure	Date of vacancy	Table	Incoming head coach	Date of appointment	Table
Dnipro	(Ukraine) Oleh Protasov	Resigned	29 August 2008	6th	(Ukraine) Volodymyr Bezsonov (acting)	29 August 2008	6th
Dnipro	(Ukraine) Oleksandr Ishchenko	Sacked	5 September 2008	16th	(Ukraine) Illya Blyznyuk (acting)	5 September 2008	16th
Chornomorets	(Russia) Vitaly Shevchenko	Resigned	4 November 2008	9th	(Ukraine) Viktor Hryshko (acting)	4 November 2008	9th

== Qualification to European competitions for 2009–10 ==
- After the 23rd Round, Dynamo Kyiv qualified for European football for the 2009–10 season.
- After the 26th Round, Shakhtar Donetsk qualified for European football for the 2009–10 season, while Dynamo Kyiv – for the 2009–10 UEFA Champions League with an away 1–0 win over Zorya Luhansk.
- After the 27th Round, Metalist Kharkiv qualified for European football for the 2009–10 season, while Dynamo Kyiv won the League's title with 3–2 home win over Tavriya Simferopol.
- After the 28th Round, Shakhtar Donetsk qualified for the 2009–10 UEFA Champions League with an away 3–0 win over Zorya Luhansk.
- After the 30th Round, Metalurh Donetsk qualified for the 2009–10 UEFA Europa League with the 0–0 home draw against Arsenal Kyiv.
- After beating Shakhtar Donetsk in the final of the 2008–09 Ukrainian Cup (1–0), Vorskla qualified for the Europa League play-off round, which qualified Metalist for the Europa League third qualification round and Metalurh for the second qualification round

Timeline of qualification

== League table ==
Pos	Team	Pld	W	D	L	GF	GA	GD	Pts	Qualification or relegation
1	Dynamo Kyiv (C)	30	26	1	3	71	19	+52	79	Qualification to Champions League group stage
2	Shakhtar Donetsk	30	19	7	4	47	16	+31	64	Qualification to Champions League third qualifying round
3	Metalist Kharkiv	30	17	8	5	44	25	+19	59	Qualification to Europa League third qualifying round
4	Metalurh Donetsk	30	14	7	9	36	27	+9	49	Qualification to Europa League second qualifying round
5	Vorskla Poltava	30	14	7	9	32	26	+6	49	Qualification to Europa League play-off round
6	Dnipro Dnipropetrovsk	30	13	9	8	34	25	+9	48	
7	Metalurh Zaporizhzhia	30	12	9	9	29	30	−1	45	
8	Tavriya Simferopol	30	10	7	13	41	45	−4	37	
9	Karpaty Lviv	30	8	10	12	33	39	−6	34	
10	Chornomorets Odesa	30	12	2	16	34	42	−8	32 (Note: Chornomorets were docked 6 points for failing to satisfy contractual obligations with the Bosnian player Đorđe Inđić.)	
11	Arsenal Kyiv	30	8	8	14	26	33	−7	32	
12	Kryvbas Kryvyi Rih	30	8	8	14	21	36	−15	32	
13	Zorya Luhansk	30	8	7	15	29	45	−16	31	
14	Illichivets Mariupol	30	7	5	18	31	54	−23	26	
15	FC Lviv (R)	30	6	8	16	24	39	−15	26	Relegation to Ukrainian First League
16	FC Kharkiv (R)	30	2	9	19	19	50	−31	12 (Note: On 6 May 2009 FC Kharkiv were docked 3 points by the Disciplinary Committee of the FPL (application fees).)	Relegation to Ukrainian First League

Source: uafootball.net.ua
Rules for classification: 1st points; 2nd overall wins; 3rd goal difference; 4th goals scored
(C) Champions; (R) Relegated

== Results ==
Home \ Away	ARK	CHO	DNI	DYN	ILL	KAR	KHA	KRY	LVI	MET	MDO	MZA	SHA	TAV	VOR	ZOR
Arsenal Kyiv	—	1–0	0–1	0–2	4–0	4–0	1–0	1–1	0–0	0–2	0–1	2–0	0–0	1–1	0–0	1–1
Chornomorets Odesa	0–1	—	1–1	0–3	3–2	3–0	3–1	2–0	1–0	1–0	2–1	2–1	0–3	0–2	0–1	1–3
Dnipro	2–1	4–1	—	1–3	0–0	1–0	4–1	1–0	1–1	2–0	1–1	1–2	0–0	0–1	2–1	1–1
Dynamo Kyiv	3–0	3–1	2–1	—	2–0	4–0	1–0	3–0	1–0	1–2	1–0	2–0	1–0	3–2	4–1	5–0
Illichivets Mariupol	2–1	1–0	1–2	3–4	—	1–5	1–1	2–0	2–0	0–2	0–1	1–1	1–2	3–3	1–3	1–0
Karpaty Lviv	3–1	3–0	0–0	1–4	1–0	—	0–2	3–0	2–1	0–2	1–1	0–0	1–1	0–1	0–0	1–1
FC Kharkiv	1–1	1–1	0–2	0–4	1–2	1–1	—	0–1	2–3	1–2	1–0	0–2	0–0	0–3	0–1	2–3
Kryvbas Kryvyi Rih	1–0	0–2	0–1	2–1	0–0	1–1	1–1	—	2–0	1–3	1–2	1–0	0–1	1–1	0–2	2–1
FC Lviv	0–1	0–2	0–1	0–1	2–1	2–4	1–0	1–0	—	1–1	0–1 (Note: The game was played in Kyiv.)	1–2 (Note: The game was played in Lutsk as the Lviv's home ground was temporarily suspended due to its poor pitch conditions (see Stadiums).)	2–0	2–4	0–0	3–1
Metalist Kharkiv	3–1	2–0	3–2	0–2	2–0	1–1	1–1	1–0	0–0	—	1–1	1–1	0–3	3–0	3–1	2–1
Metalurh Donetsk	0–0	1–0	1–1	0–2	2–0	1–0	3–0	1–1	2–0	0–2	—	3–1	1–2	2–1	2–1	3–0
Metalurh Zaporizhzhia	2–1	1–3	0–1	1–3	2–0	0–0	0–0	0–0	2–1	1–0	2–1	—	1–0	1–0	1–0	2–1
Shakhtar Donetsk	3–0	1–0	1–0	1–0	3–0	1–0	3–0	4–2	2–0	2–2	1–1	2–2	—	2–0	1–0	3–1
Tavriya Simferopol	3–1	1–3	0–0	1–3	3–2	1–4	1–1	0–1	2–2	0–1	4–1	2–0	0–2	—	1–3	2–1
Vorskla Poltava	1–0	2–1	1–0	2–2	2–3	2–1	2–1	0–0	0–0	0–1	1–0	1–1	1–0	1–0	—	0–1
Zorya Luhansk	0–1	2–1	2–0	0–1	2–1	1–0	2–0	1–2	1–1	1–1	0–2	0–0	0–3	1–1	0–2	—

Source: uafootball.net.ua
Legend: Blue = home team win; Yellow = draw; Red = away team win.

== Round by round ==
The following table is a historic representation of the team's position in the standings after the completion of each round.

Team ╲ Round	1	2	3	4	5	6	7	8	9	10	11	12	13	14	15	16	17	18	19	20	21	22	23	24	25	26	27	28	29	30
Arsenal Kyiv	3	4	5	6	8	11	10	10	9	11	12	12	13	13	13	12	12	11	10	11	13	12	12	12	12	13	14	12	10	11
Chornomorets Odesa	11	16	10	5	6	8	6	8	7	8	9	9	9	10	10	10	9	12	12	10	11	13	13	13	13	12	12	11	12	10
Dnipro	9	13	9	10	5	6	5	7	8	7	6	6	6	5	6	6	7	7	8	8	7	7	7	7	6	7	6	5	5	6
Dynamo Kyiv	1	1	3	3	2	2	2	2	1	1	1	1	1	1	1	1	1	1	1	1	1	1	1	1	1	1	1	1	1	1
Illichivets Mariupol	15	7	12	14	15	16	16	16	13	14	13	13	12	12	12	14	14	15	15	15	15	14	14	14	15	15	15	15	14	14
Karpaty Lviv	11	10	15	13	13	12	12	12	12	12	11	11	11	9	9	9	10	8	7	7	8	8	8	9	10	10	10	10	11	9
FC Kharkiv	11	11	13	15	16	15	14	15	15	15	16	16	16	16	16	16	16	16	16	16	16	16	16	16	16	16	16	16	16	16
Kryvbas Kryvyi Rih	3	4	8	12	11	10	8	9	10	9	10	10	10	11	11	11	11	10	11	12	10	9	9	8	8	9	9	9	9	12
FC Lviv	1	7	11	11	10	13	13	13	16	16	14	14	15	15	15	15	15	14	14	14	14	15	15	15	14	14	13	14	15	15
Metalist Kharkiv	7	3	2	2	3	3	4	4	3	3	3	3	2	2	3	2	2	2	2	3	3	2	3	3	3	3	3	3	3	3
Metalurh Donetsk	3	2	1	1	1	1	1	1	2	2	2	2	3	3	2	3	3	4	5	4	4	4	4	4	4	4	4	4	4	4
Metalurh Zaporizhzhia	11	11	14	9	12	7	9	6	6	5	5	5	5	6	7	7	6	6	6	6	6	6	6	6	7	5	7	7	7	7
Shakhtar Donetsk	15	13	7	8	7	9	11	11	11	10	8	8	7	7	5	5	5	5	3	2	2	3	2	2	2	2	2	2	2	2
Tavriya Simferopol	9	15	16	16	14	14	15	14	14	13	15	15	14	14	14	13	13	13	13	13	12	11	11	11	9	8	8	8	8	8
Vorskla Poltava	3	9	4	4	4	4	3	3	4	4	4	4	4	4	4	4	4	3	4	5	5	5	5	5	5	6	5	6	6	5
Zorya Luhansk	7	4	6	7	9	5	7	5	5	6	7	7	8	8	8	8	8	9	9	9	9	10	10	10	11	11	11	13	13	13

Source: kicker.de (in German)

== Top scorers ==
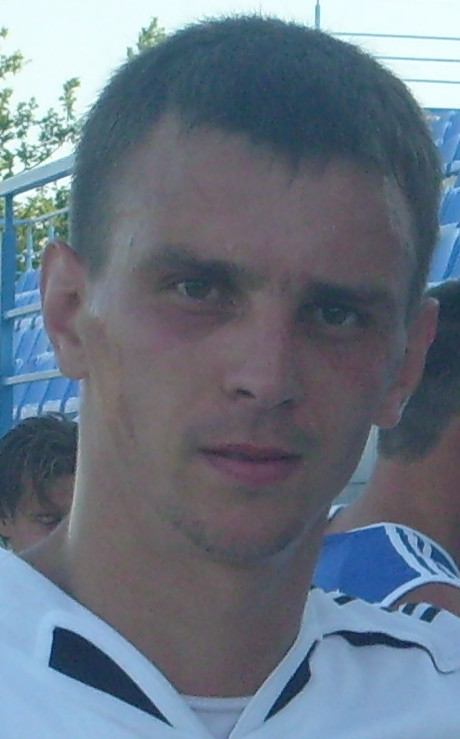
Kovpak in 2009

#	Scorer	Goals (Pen.)	Team
1	(Ukraine) Oleksandr Kovpak	17 (6)	Tavriya Simferopol
2	(Guinea) Ismaël Bangoura	13 (1)	Dynamo Kyiv
2	(Ukraine) Oleksandr Aliyev	13 (3)	Dynamo Kyiv
4	(Brazil) Jajá	11 (1)	Metalist Kharkiv
5	(Ukraine) Serhiy Kuznetsov	10	Karpaty Lviv
5	(Albania) Parid Xhihani	10	Zorya Luhansk
5	(Ukraine) Artem Milevskyi	10 (1)	Dynamo Kyiv
8	(Romania) Tiberiu Ghioane	9	Dynamo Kyiv
9	(Ukraine) Oleksandr Kosyrin	8	Chornomorets Odesa
9	(Ukraine) Marko Dević	8 (2)	Metalist Kharkiv
9	(Portugal) Ricardo Fernandes	8 (6)	Metalurh Donetsk

== Season awards ==
The laureates of the 2008–09 UPL season were:

- Best player: (Croatia) Darijo Srna (Shakhtar Donetsk)
- Best coach: (Romania) Mircea Lucescu (Shakhtar Donetsk)
- Best arbiter: (Ukraine) Andriy Shandor (Lviv)
- Best goalscorer: (Ukraine) Oleksandr Kovpak (Tavriya Simferopol)
- Fair play prize: (Ukraine) Dynamo Kyiv

== Stadiums ==
FC Kharkiv played in Sumy, because Dynamo Stadium in Kharkiv which was recently bought by the club requires major renovations. The club returned to their home ground in April for their 24th Round game against Tavriya. Arsenal Kyiv, who also has a chronic problem with obtaining its own home ground, shared three stadiums in the first half of the season. Initially allowed to play at Lobanovsky Dynamo Stadium, Arsenal was forced to seek another home venue during its times financial hardship. Arsenal was spotted by Obolon Kyiv that let the club utilize the Obolon Stadium. As the problem continues to be unresolved with Arsenal's home field, they could possibly relocate from Kyiv, with some speculations of moving to Sumy Oblast.

Dnipro Dnipropetrovsk has moved this season to the newly built Dnipro Stadium, but still played some of its games at Stadium Meteor on occasion. Also Shakhtar Donetsk plans to move to the newly built Donbass Arena once it is completely built. FC Chornomorets Odesa, due to renovations at Chornomorets Stadium played its games in the second half of the season at Spartak Stadium.

Newly promoted FC Lviv decided to use Ukraina Stadium expecting to attract extra fans in Lviv. However, economic factors as well as poor performances and lack of support in the area the club decided after the winter break to return to their original home ground Kniazha Arena in Dobromyl. After one home game in atrocious conditions in early spring which damaged the pitch the club was forced to look to other venues (including Avanhard Stadium in Lutsk and Bannikov Stadium in Kyiv). Late in April FC Lviv returned for home fixtures at Kniazha Arena.

=== List of home stadiums ===
Rank	Stadium	Capacity	Club	Notes
1	Dnipro Stadium	31,003	Dnipro Dnipropetrovsk	Moved from Stadium Meteor (12 games)
2	Metalurh Stadium	29,783	Kryvbas Kryvyi Rih	
3	Ukraina Stadium	28,051	Karpaty Lviv	Stadium under renovations
4	RSK Olimpiyskiy	25,831	Shakhtar Donetsk	
5	Vorskla Stadium	25,000	Vorskla Poltava	
6	OSK Metalist	22,757	Metalist Kharkiv	Stadium under renovations
7	Avanhard Stadium	22,320	Zorya Luhansk	
8	Lokomotiv Stadium	19,978	Tavriya Simferopol	
9	Lobanovsky Dynamo Stadium	16,873	Dynamo Kyiv; Arsenal Kyiv	Temporarily leased to FC Arsenal
10	Illichivets Stadium	12,680	Illichivets Mariupol	
11	Slavutych Arena	11,983	Metalurh Zaporizhzhia	
12	Dynamo Stadium (Kharkiv)	9,000	FC Kharkiv	FC Kharkiv played only its last four games (all lost)
13	Metalurh Stadium	5,300	Metalurh Donetsk	
14	Spartak Stadium	5,000	Chornomorets Odesa	Chornomorets' secondary home ground.
15	Kniazha Arena	3,220	FC Lviv	FC Lviv's home ground in Dobromyl

=== Auxiliary or former home stadiums ===
Rank	Stadium	Capacity	Club	Notes
1	Chornomorets Stadium	34,362	Chornomorets Odesa	Home ground for the first half (9 games)
2	Yuvileiny Stadium (Sumy)	29,300	FC Kharkiv	FC Kharkiv lease until April 2009 (11 games)
3	Ukraina Stadium	28,051	FC Lviv	Lent to FC Lviv in the first half.
4	Stadium Meteor	24,381	Dnipro Dnipropetrovsk	Played only first three games
5	Avanhard Stadium	11,574	FC Lviv	Lent to FC Lviv for a single game
6	Dynamo Stadium (Kharkiv)	9,000	Metalist Kharkiv	Played the last game of season against Kryvbas
7	Obolon Stadium	4,300	Arsenal Kyiv	Lent to Arsenal Kyiv by Obolon Kyiv
8	Bannikov Stadium	1,678	Arsenal Kyiv, FC Lviv	Lent to Arsenal Kyiv and FC Lviv by FFU
9	Dynamo Club Stadium	750	Arsenal Kyiv	Lent to Arsenal Kyiv by Dynamo Kyiv

== See also ==
- Ukrainian Premier League reserves 2008-09
- Ukrainian First League 2008-09
- Ukrainian Second League 2008-09
- Ukrainian Cup 2008–09
- UEFA Cup 2008-09
