= 2008–09 Ukrainian Premier League youth championship =

Ukrainian Premier League youth championship
- Season: 2008–09
- Champions: FC Shakhtar Donetsk reserves
- Runner up: FC Dynamo Kyev reserves
- Relegated: FC Kharkiv reserves FC Lviv reserves

The 2008–09 Ukrainian Premier League youth championship season was a competition between the U-21 youth teams of Ukrainian Premier League clubs. The competition has reorganized from the last season by transitioning to age restricted competition under complete administration of the newly established Ukrainian Premier League.

The events in the senior leagues during the 2007-08 season saw Naftovyk Reserves and Zakarpattia Reserves all relegated and replaced by the promoted teams Illichivets Mariupol Reserves and Lviv Reserves.

== Final standings ==
Pos	Team	Pld	W	D	L	GF	GA	GD	Pts
1	Shakhtar Donetsk reserves (C)	30	23	5	2	70	18	+52	74
2	Dynamo Kyiv reserves	30	19	7	4	81	26	+55	64
3	Chornomorets Odesa reserves	30	18	4	8	62	39	+23	58
4	Vorskla Poltava reserves	30	18	4	8	55	35	+20	58
5	Dnipro Dnipropetrovsk reserves	30	16	5	9	53	41	+12	53
6	Metalist Kharkiv reserves	30	15	4	11	49	35	+14	49
7	Metalurh Zaporizhzhia reserves	30	15	3	12	50	48	+2	48
8	Karpaty Lviv reserves	30	12	8	10	45	36	+9	44
9	Illichivets Mariupol reserves	30	13	4	13	41	45	−4	43
10	Metalurh Donetsk reserves	30	12	1	17	39	53	−14	37
11	FC Kharkiv reserves (R)	30	12	1	17	41	66	−25	37
12	Arsenal Kyiv reserves	30	10	4	16	37	57	−20	34
13	FC Lviv reserves (R)	30	7	5	18	29	60	−31	26
14	Kryvbas Kryvyi Rih reserves	30	6	6	18	34	64	−30	24
15	Zorya Luhansk reserves	30	6	6	18	29	61	−32	24
16	Tavriya Simferopol reserves	30	2	5	23	28	61	−33	11

Source: Premier League Reserves website (in Ukrainian)
Rules for classification: 1) points; 2) goal difference; 3) number of goals scored. Relegation is dependent on senior club.
(C) Champions; (R) Relegated

== Top scorers ==
Scorer	Goals	Team
(Ukraine) Roman Zozulia	19 (4)	Dynamo Reserves
(Ukraine) Oleksandr Kasyan	14 (3)	Shakhtar Reserves
(Ukraine) Vitaliy Balashov	12 (3)	Chornomorets Reserves
(Ukraine) Yaroslav Rakitskyi	11 (4)	Shakhtar Reserves
(Ukraine) Yevhen Konoplyanka	11 (7)	Dnipro Dnipropetrovsk Reserves
(Ukraine) Yuriy Furta	10	Karpaty Lviv Reserves
(Ukraine) Pavlo Misko	10 (1)	Kryvbas Kryvyi Rih Reserves
(Ukraine) Taras Yavorskyi	9 (3)	Lviv Reserves
(Ukraine) Vitaliy Kaverin	8	Dnipro Dnipropetrovsk Reserves
(Ukraine) Yevhen Santrapinskykh	8	Metalurh Zaporizhzhia Reserves
(Ukraine) Ihor Sylantyev	8 (1)	Chornomorets Odesa Reserves

== See also ==
- 2008–09 Ukrainian Premier League
