= Viktor Ryashko =

Viktor Ryashko may refer to:

- Viktor Ryashko (footballer, born 1964) (1964–2020), Ukrainian retired footballer and manager
- Viktor Ryashko (footballer, born 1992), Ukrainian footballer
