= FC Kharkiv (2005) =

- Full name: FC Kharkiv
- Nickname: Horozhane
- Founded: 2005; 21 years ago
- Dissolved: 2010; 16 years ago
- Ground: Dynamo Stadium
- Capacity: 9,000
- Chairman: (Ukraine) Vitaly Danilov
- League: —
- 2009–10: 17th in Ukrainian First League (relegated)
Home colours	Away colours

FC Kharkiv (Ukrainian: ФК "Харків") is a defunct football club based in Kharkiv, Ukraine. Owned by a former vice-president of FC Metalist Kharkiv, Vitaliy Danilov, the club was created in 2005, following the conflict between Danilov and the president of FC Metalist Kharkiv, Oleksandr Yaroslavskyi.

After the 2009–10 Ukrainian First League season, the club was relegated to the Ukrainian Second League. However, they failed attestation when they submitted falsified documents to the Attestation Committee of the Football Federation of Ukraine and their professional license was withdrawn.

== History ==
The current club was renamed in 2005, when it was promoted to the Vyscha Liha for the first time. Originally the club entered the Ukrainian Professional League in the Druha Liha Group C in the 1999–2000 season as FC Arsenal Kharkiv.

Arsenal Kharkiv was promoted to the Persha Liha after finishing 2nd in the Druha Liha Group C in 2001/02 season. After a 2nd-place finish in the 2004–05 Persha Liha, Arsenal Kharkiv was promoted to the Vyshcha Liha for the first time and prior to the season the club was bought by new management and they renamed the team to FC Kharkiv. The newly established club presented three teams in the Ukrainian competitions, the senior squad competed in the Top League, the second team (FC Kharkiv-2) competed in the Second League, while another reserve squad (FC Kharkiv-d) competed in the special Reserve competitions.

In the 2006–07 season the senior team finished 12th, while the team's forward Oleksandr Hladky became the top goalscorer of the season with 13 goals. The club's home ground Dynamo Stadium was under repair for some of the 2008–09 season forcing them to move to Sumy and play in the Yuvileiny Stadium. The club struggled in the Premier League that season and eventually relegated to the Persha Liha. On 13 July 2010 the club was officially excluded from among the professional clubs of Ukraine.

=== Football kits and sponsors ===
Years	Football kit	Shirt sponsor
2005–2006	adidas	–
2006–2007	adidas/nike	–
2007–2009	nike	–

== Head coaches ==
- (Ukraine) Hennadiy Litovchenko (2005–06)
- (Ukraine) Volodymyr Kulayev (2006)
- (Ukraine) Volodymyr Bezsonov (2006–08) (resigned)
- (Ukraine) Mykhailo Stelmakh (2008–10)
- (Ukraine) Rinat Morozov (2010)

== League and Cup history ==
=== FC Kharkiv ===
Season	Div.	Pos.	Pl.	W	D	L	GS	GA	P	Domestic Cup	Europe	Notes
1999–2005	Refer to FC Arsenal Kharkiv											
2005–06	1st	13	30	9	6	15	29	36	33	1/16 finals		
2006–07	1st	12	30	8	9	13	26	38	33	1/8 finals		
2007–08	1st	14	30	6	9	15	20	32	27	1/16 finals		
2008–09	1st	16	30	2	9	19	19	50	12	1/8 finals		Relegated
2009–10	2nd	17	34	3	5	26	23	76	14	1/16 finals		Relegated

=== Kharkiv-2 ===
Season	Div.	Pos.	Pl.	W	D	L	GS	GA	P	Domestic Cup	Europe	Notes
2005–06	3rd	13	24	0	3	21	12	60	3			Dissolved

== See also ==
- FC Dynamo Kharkiv
- FC Metalist Kharkiv
- FC Helios Kharkiv
- FC Arsenal Kharkiv
- FC Hazovyk-KhGV Kharkiv
- FC Kharkiv Reserves and Youth Team
