= Pavlo Lobtsov =

Ukrainian footballer

Personal information
- Date of birth: 9 January 1988 (age 38)
- Place of birth: Kharkiv, Ukrainian SSR
- Height: 1.80 m (5 ft 11 in)
- Position: Midfielder

Youth career
- 2000–2003: Slavutych
- 2004–2005: Dynamo Kyiv
- 2005–2007: Kharkiv

Senior career*
Years	Team	Apps	(Gls)
2005–2007	Kharkiv	0	(0)
2005–2006	→ Kharkiv-2	7	(0)
2008–2009	Gomel	9	(0)
2010	Skala Morshyn	7	(0)
2011	Yednist Plysky	7	(0)
2011	Poltava	2	(0)
2012	Polissya Dobryanka	13	(6)
2013	Arsenal-Kyivshchyna Bila Tserkva	33	(0)
2014	Bucha	16	(0)
2015	Mezhyhirya Novi Petrivtsi	7	(3)
2015	Obukhiv	0	(0)
- * Club domestic league appearances and goals

Pavlo Lobtsov (Ukrainian: Павло Лобцов; born 9 January 1988) is a Ukrainian former professional football player.
