= Eurocup Basketball 2011–12 Regular Season Group F =

Standings and Results for Group F of the Regular Season phase of the 2011–12 Eurocup basketball tournament.

== Standings ==
Key to colors
Top two teams advance to Last 16

	Team	Pld	W	L	PF	PA	Diff
1.	(Lithuania) Lietuvos rytas	6	6	0	478	370	+108
2.	(Slovenia) Krka	6	4	2	434	421	+13
3.	(Ukraine) Azovmash	6	1	5	404	453	−49
4.	(France) Le Mans	6	1	5	392	464	−72

== Fixtures and results ==
All times given below are in Central European Time.

=== Game 1 ===
15 November 2011
17:00

Report

BC Azovmash (Ukraine)	79–76	(France) Le Mans
Scoring by quarter: 21–22, 22–21, 25–14, 11–19
Pts: Ewing 21; Rebs: Pecherov, Golubović 8 Asts: Ewing 7		Pts: Sommerville 16; Rebs: Batista 6 Asts: Acker 6

Sportkompleks Illichivets, Mariupol
Attendance: 3,000
Referees: Milivoje Jovcic (SRB), Marcin Kowalski (POL), Gentian Cici (ALB)

15 November 2011
20:30

Report

BC Krka (Slovenia)	65–73	(Lithuania) Lietuvos rytas
Scoring by quarter: 21–18, 18–17, 20–18, 6–20
Pts: Ray 14; Rebs: Jordan 8 Asts: Ray 4		Pts: Rice 19; Rebs: Roberts, Valančiūnas 8 Asts: Rice 4

Leon Štukelj Hall, Novo Mesto
Attendance: 1,200
Referees: Spiros Gkontas (GRE), Tomas Trawicki (POL), Sasa Maricic (SRB)

=== Game 2 ===
22 November 2011
18:10

Report

Lietuvos rytas (Lithuania)	83–55	(Ukraine) BC Azovmash
Scoring by quarter: 10–16, 24–12, 22–12, 27–15
Pts: Seibutis 17; Rebs: Samardžiski 11; Asts: Rašić 7		Pts: Minard 12; Rebs: Rizvić 13; Asts: Ewing 4

Siemens Arena, Vilnius
Attendance: 4,700
Referees: Marek Cmikiewic (POL), Oscar Lefwerth (SWE), Neil Wilkinson (ENG)

22 November 2011
20:30

Report

Le Mans (France)	65–84	(Slovenia) BC Krka
Scoring by quarter: 14–24, 21–18, 14–21, 16–21
Pts: Coleman 11; Rebs: Kahudi 6 Asts: Kahudi 4		Pts: Ray 23; Rebs: Dragić 7 Asts: Ray 4

Antarès, Le Mans
Attendance: 4,000
Referees: Roberto Chiari (ITA), Renaud Geller (BEL), Enrico Sabetta (ITA)

=== Game 3 ===
29 November 2011
17:00

Report

BC Azovmash (Ukraine)	66–71	(Slovenia) BC Krka
Scoring by quarter: 17–26, 10–16, 24–15, 15–14
Pts: Minard 31; Rebs: Minard 10; Asts: Rizvić 3		Pts: Dragić 14; Rebs: Jordan 9 Asts: four players 3

Sportkompleks Illichivets, Mariupol
Attendance: 2,890
Referees: Olegs Latisevs (LAT), Sergey Mikhaylov (RUS), Seffi Shemmesh (ISR)

29 November 2011
20:30

Report

Le Mans (France)	62–79	(Lithuania) Lietuvos rytas
Scoring by quarter: 20–12, 12–26, 7–24, 23–17
Pts: Acker 17; Rebs: Kahudi 5 Asts: Rochestie 5		Pts: Babrauskas 15; Rebs: Roberts 15; Asts: Seibutis, Rašić 4

Antarès, Le Mans
Attendance: 3,700
Referees: Jose Martín (ESP), Oscar Perea (ESP), Carmelo Lo Guzzo (ITA)

=== Game 4 ===
6 December 2011
18:10

Report

Lietuvos rytas (Lithuania)	87–49	(France) Le Mans
Scoring by quarter: 26–10, 23–11, 19–10, 19–18
Pts: Seibutis, Samardžiski 14; Rebs: Valančiūnas 11; Asts: Rice 6		Pts: Batista 10; Rebs: Sommerville 7 Asts: Kahudi, Rochestie 3

Siemens Arena, Vilnius
Attendance: 4,900
Referees: Zoran Sutulovic (MNE), Tomasz Trawicki (POL), Arnis Ozols (LAT)

6 December 2011
20:00

Report

BC Krka (Slovenia)	74–70	(Ukraine) BC Azovmash
Scoring by quarter: 20–23, 22–14, 9–21, 23–12
Pts: Balažič 24; Rebs: Pavič 7 Asts: Krivec 8		Pts: Ewing 19; Rebs: Rančík 10; Asts: Minard 4

Leon Štukelj Hall, Novo Mesto
Attendance: 1,200
Referees: Robert Vyklicky (CZE), Carmelo Paternico (ITA), Ingus Baumanis (LAT)

=== Game 5 ===
12 December 2011
18:10

Report

Lietuvos rytas (Lithuania)	82–72	(Slovenia) BC Krka
Scoring by quarter: 15–18, 20–22, 25–19, 22–13
Pts: Rice 16; Rebs: Roberts 10; Asts: Rice 7		Pts: Baxter 14; Rebs: Pavič 9 Asts: Murić 3

Siemens Arena, Vilnius
Attendance: 4,100
Referees: Rustu Nuran (TUR), Sergey Chebyshev (UKR), Moritz Reiter (GER)

13 December 2011
20:30

Report

Le Mans (France)	75–67	(Ukraine) BC Azovmash
Scoring by quarter: 10–21, 27–12, 21–20, 17–14
Pts: Rochestie 18; Rebs: Boungou Colo 9 Asts: Acker 4		Pts: Minard 17; Rebs: Rančík 7 Asts: Slipenchuk 4

Antarès, Le Mans
Attendance: 3,700
Referees: J.R. Garcia Ortiz (ESP), Renaud Geller (BEL), Francisco Araña (ESP)

=== Game 6 ===
20 December 2011
17:00

Report

BC Azovmash (Ukraine)	67–74	(Lithuania) Lietuvos rytas
Scoring by quarter: 19–20, 17–13, 20–28, 11–13
Pts: Rančík 24; Rebs: Drozdov 6 Asts: Ewing, Slipenchuk 3		Pts: Seibutis 17; Rebs: Roberts, Samardžiski 6 Asts: Rice 7

Sportkompleks Illichivets, Mariupol
Attendance: 2,796
Referees: Petri Mäntylä (FIN), Petar Obradovic (BIH), Zdravko Rutesic (MNE)

20 December 2011
18:00

Report

BC Krka (Slovenia)	68–65	(France) Le Mans
Scoring by quarter: 25–10, 15–18, 14–18, 14–19
Pts: Pavič 13; Rebs: Balažič 14; Asts: Dragić 4		Pts: Rochestie 13; Rebs: Bryant 8 Asts: Kahudi 2

Leon Štukelj Hall, Novo Mesto
Attendance: 1,200
Referees: Seffi Shemmesh (ISR), Nicola Lepetic (MNE), Gentian Cici (ALB)
