= Prapor Stadium (Kramatorsk) =

Football stadium in Kramatorsk, Ukraine

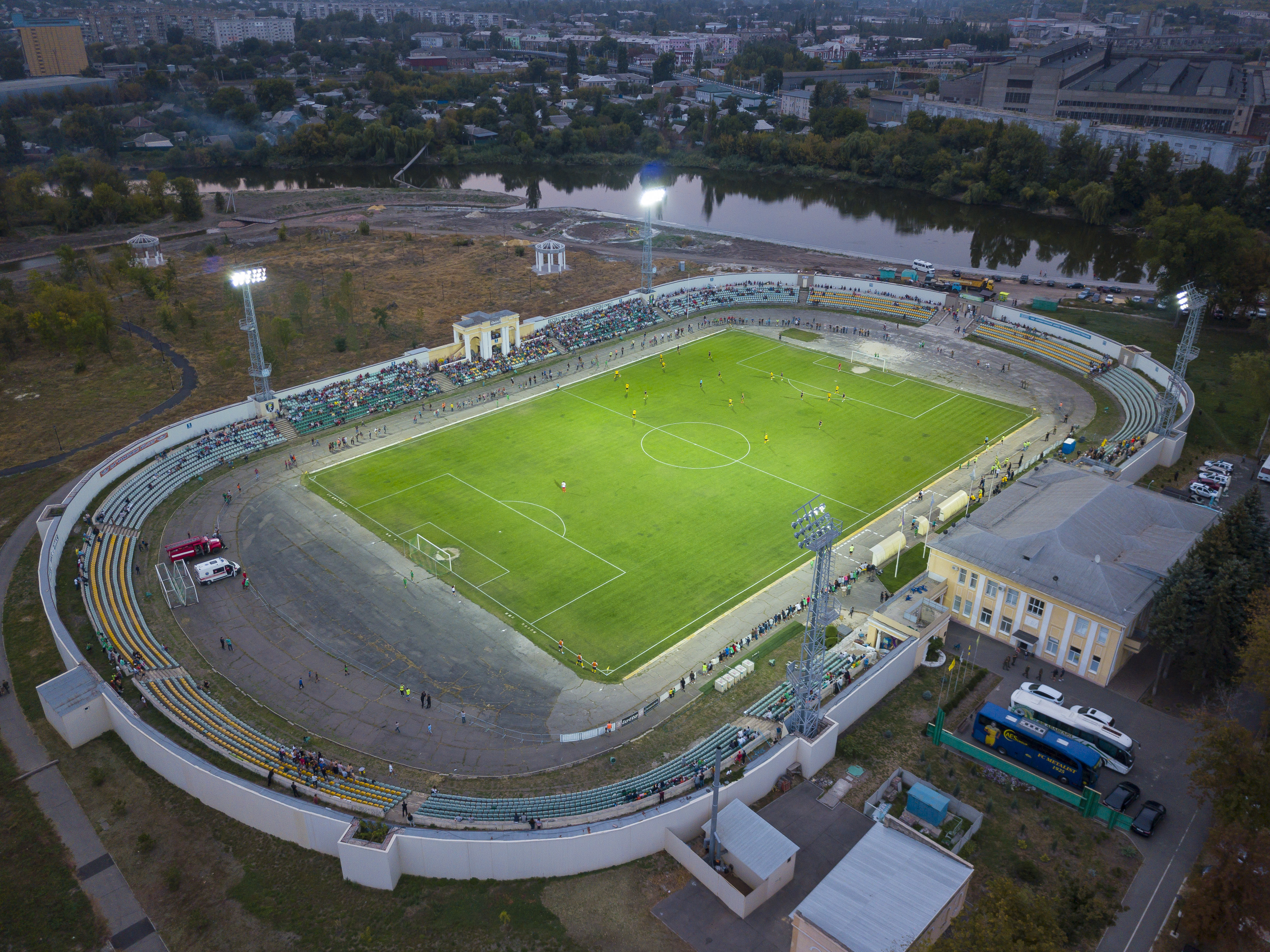
- Interactive map of Prapor Stadium
- Former names: Avanhard (2011-2017)
- Location: Kramatorsk, Donetsk Oblast, Ukraine
- Coordinates: 48.718857°N 37.549295°E
- Owner: SKMZ
- Capacity: 5,636
- Surface: Grass

Construction
- Groundbreaking: 1936
- Renovated: 1968, 2008

Tenant
- Avanhard Kramatorsk

Prapor Stadium (Ukrainian: Стадіон «Прапор») is a football stadium located in Kramatorsk, Donetsk Oblast. Built in 1936, in 2011-2017 it was known as Avanhard Stadium (Авангард). The seating capacity of the stadium is 5,636 seats.

The stadium is kept on the balance of the Old Kramatorsk Machinebuilding Factory (SKMZ).

According to some sources Kramatorsk has two stadiums and both of them carried the name of Avanhard. One is the old Prapor Stadium which is the city's central venue and located in the garden Bernatsky, the other is a Sports Complex Blyuminh (Blooming) which is owned by the New Kramatorsk Machinebuilding Factory (NKMZ) and located in the Pushkin's Park.
