= Volodymyr Kulayev =

Ukrainian footballer and coach

Personal information
- Full name: Volodymyr Pavlovych Kulayev
- Date of birth: 26 February 1958 (age 68)
- Place of birth: Kharkiv, Ukrainian SSR, Soviet Union

Senior career*
Years	Team	Apps	(Gls)
- FC Mayak Kharkiv
- FC Alga Bishkek

Managerial career
- 1990–1993: WFC Azalia Bishkek
- 1993–1995: WFC Donchanka
- 1998: FC Nyva Bershad
- 2000: Wydad AC
- 2002–2006: WFC Zhytlobud-1 Kharkiv
- 2004–2006: Ukraine (women)
- 2006: FC Kharkiv
- 2009–2010: FC Spartak Nalchik (staff)
- 2010–2011: FC Lokomotiv Moscow (staff)
- 2012–2013: FC Kuban Krasnodar (staff)
- 2013: FC Rubin Kazan (staff)
- 2014–2017: FC Rostov (staff)
- 2017–: FC Rubin Kazan (assistant)
- * Club domestic league appearances and goals

Volodymyr Pavlovych Kulayev (Ukrainian: Володимир Павлович Кулаєв; born 26 February 1958 in Kharkiv, Ukrainian SSR) is a professional Ukrainian football coach.

In 2004-2006 he served as a head coach of the Ukraine women's national football team.
