= Taras Yavorskyi =

Ukrainian footballer (born 1989)

Personal information
- Full name: Taras Yaroslavovych Yavorskyi
- Date of birth: 9 June 1989 (age 37)
- Place of birth: Lviv, Ukrainian SSR, Soviet Union
- Height: 1.81 m (5 ft 11 1/2 in)
- Position: Midfielder

Team information
- Current team: Kulykiv

Youth career
- 2002–2006: FC Karpaty Lviv

Senior career*
| Years | Team | Apps | (Gls) |
| 2006–2008 | FC Karpaty Lviv | 0 | (0) |
| 2006–2008 | FC Karpaty-2 Lviv | 57 | (9) |
| 2008–2011 | FC Lviv | 17 | (3) |
| 2009–2010 | FC Lviv-2 | 8 | (0) |
| 2010 | → MFC Mykolaiv (loan) | 11 | (1) |
| 2011–2013 | FC Bukovyna Chernivtsi | 40 | (4) |
| 2013 | Nyva Ternopil | 12 | (2) |
| 2013–2014 | Bukovyna Chernivtsi | 10 | (0) |
| 2014 | Nyva Ternopil | 9 | (2) |
| 2014–2016 | Okocimski KS Brzesko | 33 | (2) |
| 2016–2017 | Podhale Nowy Targ | 37 | (14) |
| 2017–2018 | Pelikan Łowicz | 12 | (4) |
| 2018–2020 | Górnik Konin | 48 | (19) |
| 2020–2021 | Lider Włocławek | 19 | (2) |
| 2021 | Skalnik Sulejów | 16 | (5) |
| 2022–2023 | Skala 1911 Stryi | | |
| 2023 | Yunist VNB | | |
| 2023– | Kulykiv | | |
- * Club domestic league appearances and goals as of 9 June 2024

Taras Yavorskyi (Ukrainian: Тарас Ярославович Яворський; born 9 June 1989) is a Ukrainian professional footballer who plays as a midfielder for Kulykiv.

Yavorskyi is the product of the Karpaty Sportive School in Lviv. His first coaches were Andriy Karimov and Taras Tkachyk.

He signed a contract with FC Lviv in 2008, but only made his debut for the first team in a match against FC Dnipro Dnipropetrovsk in the Ukrainian Premier League on 28 February 2009.
