= Bliuminh Stadium =

Multi-use stadium in Kramatorsk, Ukraine

Bliuming Stadium
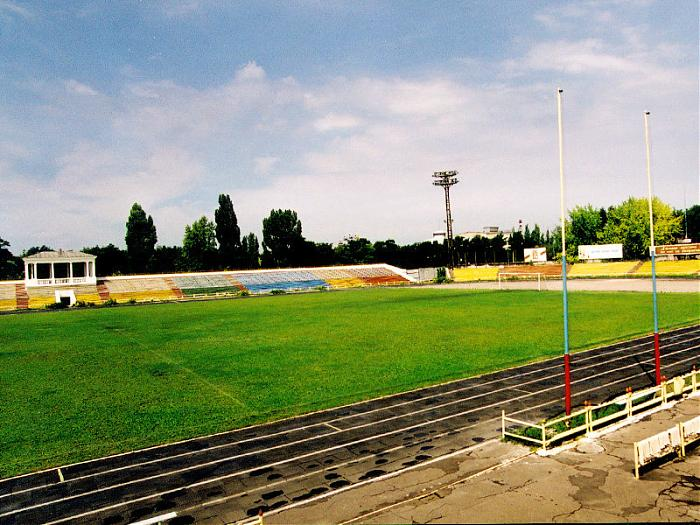
- in 2008
- Interactive map of Bliuming Stadium
- Location: Kramatorsk, Ukraine
- Coordinates: 48.747948°N 37.590204°E
- Capacity: 10,000 (football)
- Surface: Grass

Construction
- Opened: 1937; 89 years ago

Tenant
- FC Avanhard Kramatorsk

Bliuming Stadium is a multi-use stadium in Kramatorsk, Ukraine. It is used mostly for football matches, and is the home of FC Avanhard Kramatorsk. The stadium holds 10,000 spectators.

Originally built in 1937, the stadium belonged to the New Kramatorsk Engineering Factory. Following the World War II, the stadium was rebuilt in 1950s. It is located in the Pushkin City Park of Kramatorsk, Sotsmistechko neighborhood. It is one of the two main stadiums in Kramatorsk, with the other being Prapor (Avanhard) Stadium located to the south in Stara Petrivka in the Sad Bernatskoho Park (Bernard Garden).
