= Gennady Morozov =

Russian footballer and coach

Personal information
- Full name: Gennady Vladimirovich Morozov
- Date of birth: 30 December 1962 (age 63)
- Place of birth: Moscow, USSR
- Height: 1.77 m (5 ft 10 in)
- Position: Defender

Youth career
- 1972–1979: Spartak Moscow

Senior career*
| Years | Team | Apps | (Gls) |
| 1980–1986 | Spartak Moscow | 155 | (2) |
| 1987–1988 | Dynamo Moscow | 40 | (1) |
| 1989–1990 | Spartak Moscow | 41 | (1) |
| Total | | 236 | (4) |

International career
| 1985–1986 | USSR | 10 | (0) |

Managerial career
- 2001: Shatura (consultant)
- 2001–2003: Spartak Moscow (assistant)
- 2003–2004: Spartak Moscow (academy)
- 2004–2005: Spartak Moscow (assistant)
- 2005–2006: Spartak Nizhny Novgorod
- 2007: Metallurg Krasnoyarsk
- 2007: Trudovyye Rezervy-SAK Moscow (academy)
- 2008: Rīga
- 2008: Dynamo Barnaul
- 2009: Krymteplytsia Molodizhne
- 2010: Spartak Moscow (scout)
- 2010: Spartak Moscow (academy director)
- * Club domestic league appearances and goals

Gennady Vladimirovich Morozov (Russian: Геннадий Владимирович Морозов; born 30 December 1962) is a Russian football coach and a former player.

== Honours ==
- Soviet Top League winner: 1989.

== International career ==
Morozov made his debut for USSR on 7 August 1985 in a friendly against Romania. He played at the 1986 FIFA World Cup in a game against Canada.
