= Hennadiy Medvedyev =

Ukrainian footballer

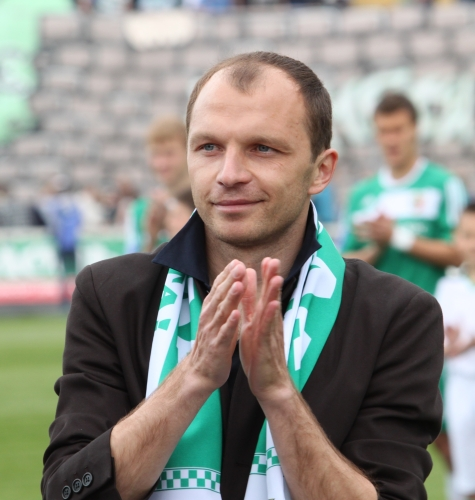

Personal information
- Date of birth: 7 February 1975 (age 51)
- Place of birth: Kyiv, Ukrainian SSR, Soviet Union
- Height: 1.81 m (5 ft 11 1/2 in)
- Position: Midfielder

Team information
- Current team: FC Vorskla Reserves (assistant)

Senior career*
Years	Team	Apps	(Gls)
1993–1995	Dynamo-3 Kyiv	44	(0)
1995–1996	Cherkasy	57	(3)
1997	CSKA-2 Kyiv	15	(0)
1997–1998	Zirka Kirovohrad	17	(0)
1997	→ Zirka-2 Kirovohrad	8	(0)
1998–2010	Vorskla Poltava	242	(2)
1998–1999	→ Vorskla-2 Poltava	11	(1)
1999–2000	→ Adoms Kremenchuk (loan)	34	(4)
2001–2003	→ Vorskla-2 Poltava	18	(0)

Managerial career
- 2011–: FC Vorskla Reserves (assistant)
- * Club domestic league appearances and goals

Hennadiy Medvedyev (born 7 February 1975) is a Ukrainian former professional football midfielder. He moved to Vorskla Poltava from Adoms (in Kremenchuk Ukrainian Second League) in January 2001 when Adoms was on the verge to be relegated out of professional ranks.
