= Viktor Ryashko (footballer, born 1992) =

Ukrainian footballer

Personal information
- Full name: Viktor Viktorovych Ryashko
- Date of birth: 27 November 1992 (age 33)
- Place of birth: Mukacheve, Zakarpattia Oblast, Ukraine
- Height: 1.88 m (6 ft 2 in)
- Position: Midfielder

Team information
- Current team: Cegléd

Youth career
- 2005–2009: Youth Sportive School Uzhhorod

Senior career*
Years	Team	Apps	(Gls)
2010–2011	Zakarpattia Uzhhorod	0	(0)
2011–2012	Volyn Lutsk	0	(0)
2012–2014	Hoverla Uzhhorod	1	(0)
2015	Balmazújváros	2	(0)
2015	Bukovyna Chernivtsi	12	(0)
2019–2021	Uzhhorod	60	(14)
2022	Kazincbarcikai	8	(0)
2022–	Cegléd	23	(3)

International career^{‡}
2012	Ukraine U20	2	(0)
- * Club domestic league appearances and goals as of 5 March 2023 ‡ National team caps and goals as of 7 January 2022

Viktor Ryashko (Ukrainian: Віктор Вікторович Ряшко; born 27 November 1992) is a Ukrainian professional footballer who plays as a midfielder for Hungarian club Cegléd.

== Career ==
Ryashko spent some years in the Sportive Youth system in Uzhhorod. He made his debut in the Ukrainian Premier League in a match against FC Vorskla Poltava entraining in the second half-time on 26 May 2013.

== Personal life ==
He is the son of Ukrainian football manager Viktor Ryashko and older brother of the footballer Mykhaylo Ryashko.
