= Ihor Sylantyev =

Ukrainian footballer

Personal information
- Full name: Ihor Ihorovych Sylantyev
- Date of birth: 3 January 1991 (age 35)
- Place of birth: Odesa, Ukrainian SSR
- Height: 1.83 m (6 ft 0 in)
- Position: Midfielder

Youth career
- 2005–2007: Chornomorets Odesa

Senior career*
Years	Team	Apps	(Gls)
2007–2012	Chornomorets Odesa	22	(2)
2010	Chornomorets-2 Odesa	9	(0)
2013	Zirka Kirovohrad	3	(0)
2018–2021	Nyva Berezanka		
2024	LKS Ślesin	3	(0)

International career
2007	Ukraine U16	10	(2)
2007–2008	Ukraine U17	14	(3)
2012	Ukraine U21	2	(0)
- * Club domestic league appearances and goals as of 13 November 2024

Ihor Sylantyev (Ukrainian: Ігор Ігорович Силантьєв; Russian: Игорь Игоревич Силантьев, Igor Igorevich Silantyev; born 3 January 1991) is a Ukrainian footballer who plays as a midfielder.

Sylantyev is product of youth team systems of Chornomorets Odesa.

He was called up to play for the Ukraine national under-21 football team by trainer Pavlo Yakovenko to the Commonwealth Cup in 2012.

In 2013, he retired from professional football after a four-month doping disqualification.

== Honours ==
LKS Ślesin

- V liga Greater Poland II: 2023–24
