= Rinat Morozov =

Ukrainian football manager (born 1969)

Personal information
- Full name: Rinat Viktorovych Morozov
- Date of birth: October 24, 1969 (age 57)
- Place of birth: Kharkiv, Ukrainian SSR, Soviet Union

Team information
- Current team: FC Arsenal-Politekhnik Kharkiv \amateurs\ (manager)

Managerial career
- Years: Team
- 1993–2002: Sportiveschool #1 Kharkiv (ass't)
- 2002–2003: FC Helios Kharkiv (ass't)
- 2003–2004: FC Helios Kharkiv
- 2004–2005: FC Helios Kharkiv (ass't)
- 2005–2006: FC Kharkiv-2
- 2006–2010: FC Gornyak Stroitel (director of Sport)
- 2010: FC Kharkiv
- 2010–: FC Arsenal-Politekhnik Kharkiv \amateurs\

Rinat Morozov (Ukrainian: Рінат Вікторович Морозов; born October 24, 1969, in Kharkiv, Ukrainian SSR) is a Ukrainian football manager. He is the current head coach of amateurs FC Arsenal-Politekhnik Kharkiv \amateurs\ in the First League of the Kharkiv Oblast.

== Career ==
Morozov, after graduating of Kharkiv State Institute of Physical culture and Sport in 1991, he began coaching career. During 2006-2010 he worked in Russian Federation as Director of Sport in FC Gornyak Stroitel in Belgorod Oblast. He spent some years as manager in FC Helios.
