= New Kramatorsk Machinebuilding Factory =

Company

JSC Novokramatorsky Mashynobudivny Zavod
- Type: Joint stock company
- Industry: Industrial equipment Mining equipment
- Founded: September 28, 1934
- Headquarters: Kramatorsk
- Key people: Georgy Skudar, President; Victor A. Pankov, Director General and Chairman
- Products: Ore crushers Rolling mills Forges, etc
- Number of employees: 16,550
- Website: http://nkmz.com/

Novokramatorsky Mashynobudivny Zavod (English:New Kramatorsk Machinebuilding Plant) (Ukrainian: Новокраматорський машинобудівний завод) is a large heavy equipment manufacturer in Ukraine. Its abbreviation is NKMZ. The company produces mining equipment; metallurgy equipment; rolling mills, forges, blast furnaces, ore crushers, presses, and other industrial process equipment. The company manufactures propeller shafts for icebreakers and components for submarines. According to its website, the company has designed and constructed over 18 mining complexes.

The company is based in the city of Kramatorsk, in Donetsk Oblast.

The plant employed over 13.4 thousand people as of March 2011. NKMZ largely determines technical progress in the machine building, metallurgy, energy, automotive, shipbuilding, chemical, defense and space industries. The list of products is constantly updated - by 80% in recent years. As a result, in 2013, the plant was ranked 3rd in the ranking of high-tech engineering enterprises in Ukraine in terms of managerial innovation.

Until 2010, the plant maintained the largest children's health center in Donetsk Oblast - more than 1,000 children could have a rest there during a shift that usually lasted three weeks.

According to posters on the Novosti Kosmonavtiki forum, a spare mobile service platform 8U216, ordered by the Soviet government back in 1971, was delivered from the NKMZ factory in Ukraine to Baikonur in 2013. However, it likely represents the older 8U216 version of the structure and, in any case, its installation would require major construction work at the pad, including the dismantling of existing equipment.

== See also ==
- Bliuminh Stadium
