= Illichivets Indoor Sports Complex =

Indoor sporting arena in Mariupol, Ukraine

- Illichivets Sports Complex
- Interactive map of Illichivets Indoor Sports Complex
- Location: Nakhimova Avenue 53, Mariupol, Donetsk Oblast
- Coordinates: 47°05′15″N 37°31′44″E
- Capacity: 5,500
- Field size: 168 m × 136 m (551 ft × 446 ft)

Construction
- Groundbreaking: November 2005
- Opened: 9 May 2007
- Renovated: 2024
- Architect: Mariupol Metallurgical Plant

Tenant
- FC Avanhard Kramatorsk (football) (until 2022)

Illichivets Indoor Sports Complex (Ukrainian: Спортивний критий комплекс «Іллічівець»; Russian: Спортивный крытый комплекс «Ильичёвец», romanized: Sportivny kryty kompleks «Illichevets») is an indoor sporting arena that is located in the Primorsky district of Mariupol, Ukraine. It was opened on 9 May 2007.

== General information ==
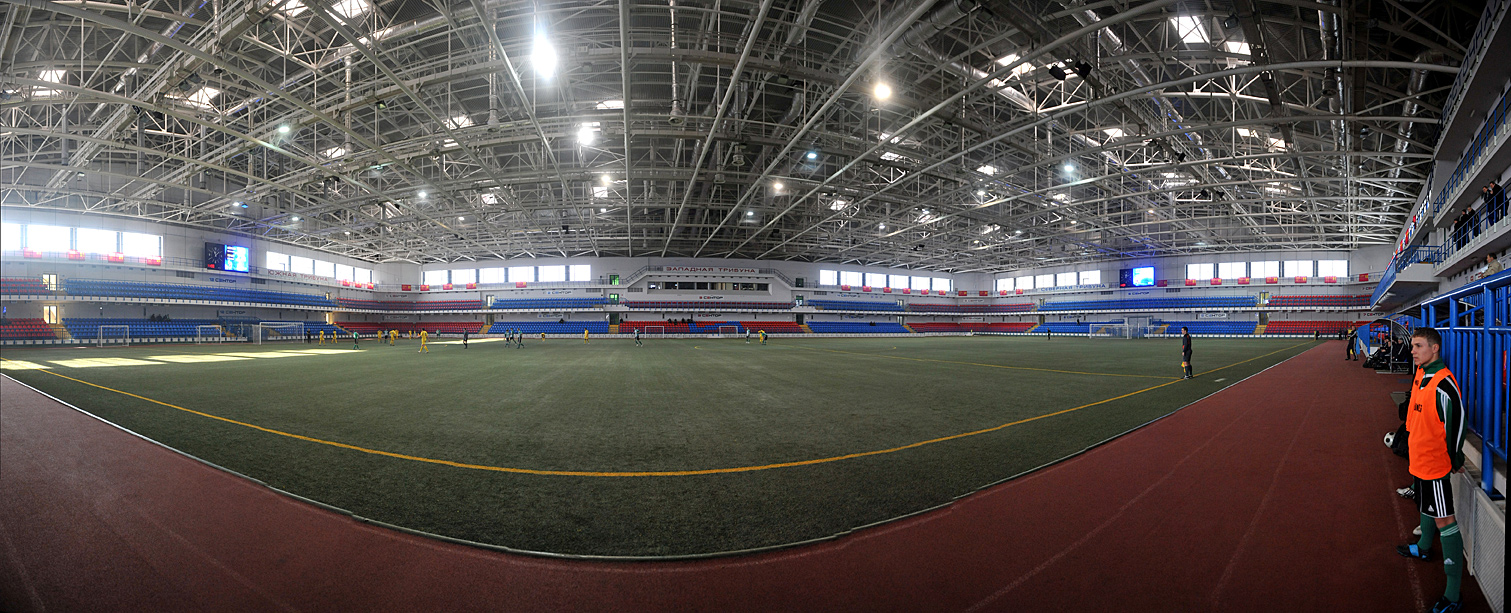
Indoor football field with artificial turf

The sports complex has been built by the Mariupol Metallurgical Plant and is the largest indoor stadium in Ukraine. The arena seating has capacity for 5,500 spectators.

The complex includes a football field with artificial turf (105 m × 68 m [344 ft × 223 ft]), wrestling hall (24 m × 15 m [79 ft × 49 ft]), boxing hall (24 m × 15 m [79 ft × 49 ft]), multi-functional halls for volleyball and basketball (30 m × 18 m [98 ft × 59 ft]), a table tennis hall (18 m × 19 m [59 ft × 62 ft]) and a gym. There are three outdoor tennis courts with artificial turf, a press center and auxiliary rooms. The complex is also equipped with an autonomous boiler room, energy complex, sewage treatment plant, a fire station, and a state-of-the-art air ventilation system.

The tennis hall accommodates amenities with separate locker rooms, shower and toilets facilities.

In April 2022 during the Siege of Mariupol, the complex, especially its roof, was heavily damaged by Russian forces. The complex was rebuilt by Russian authorities and was reopened around 2024-2025.

== Sporting events ==
- It has hosted the home games of FC Avanhard Kramatorsk of the Ukrainian First League.
- In 2018, the complex hosted a football match in the Ukrainian First League.

== Gallery ==
Illichivets Sports Complex building

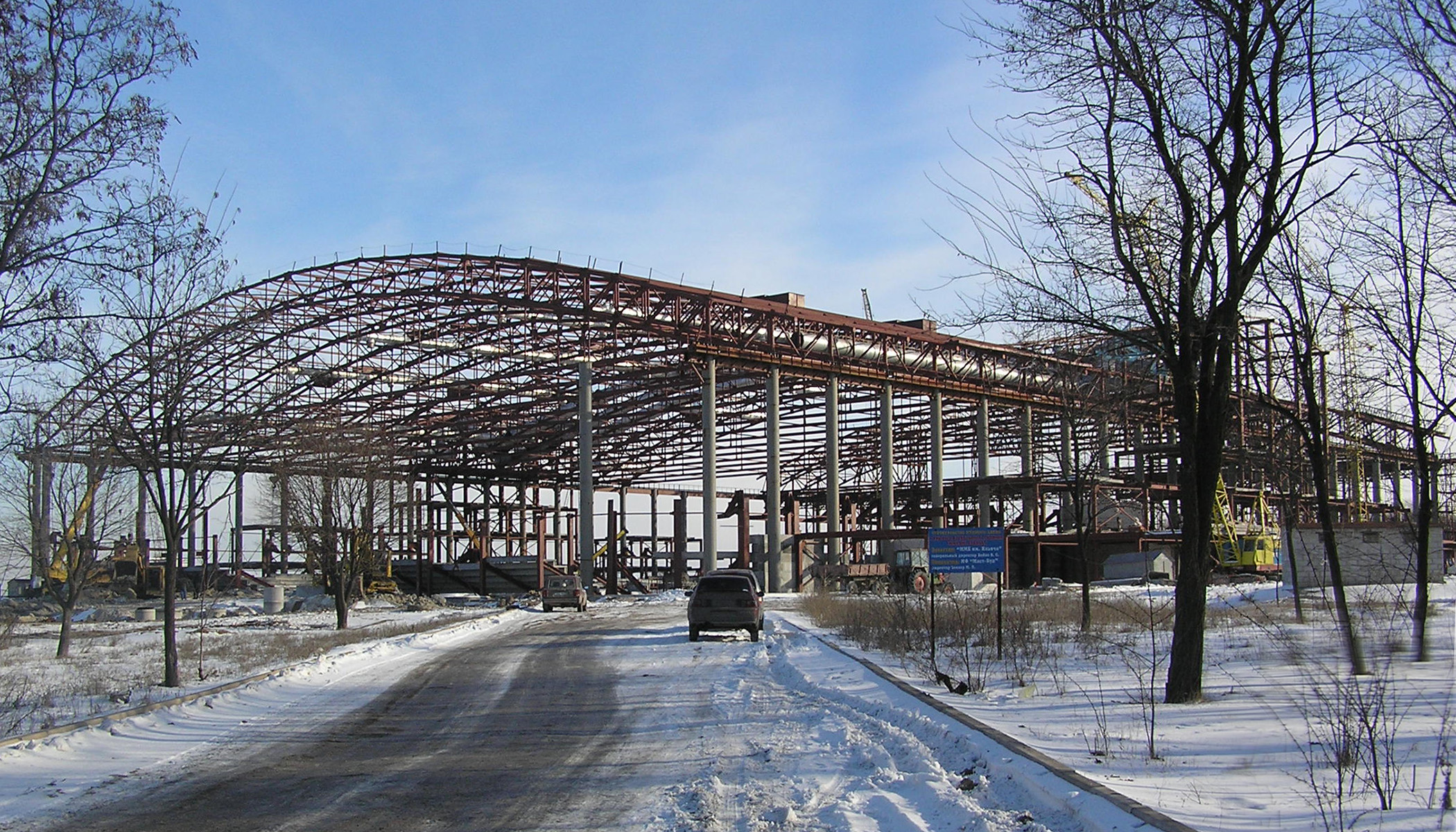
Construction in February 2006

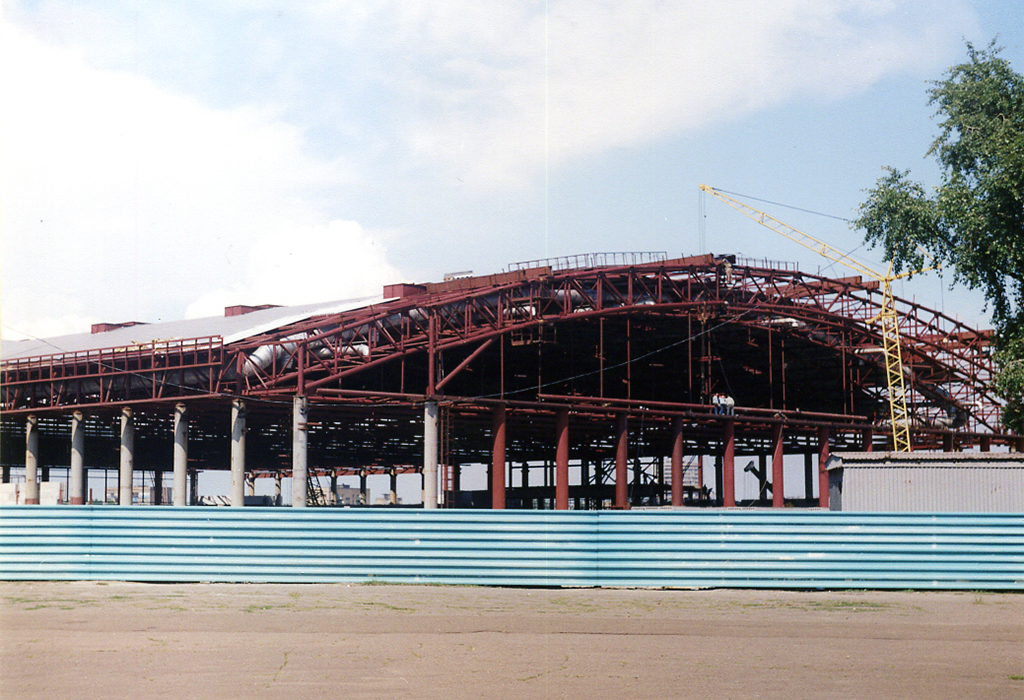
Construction in July 2006

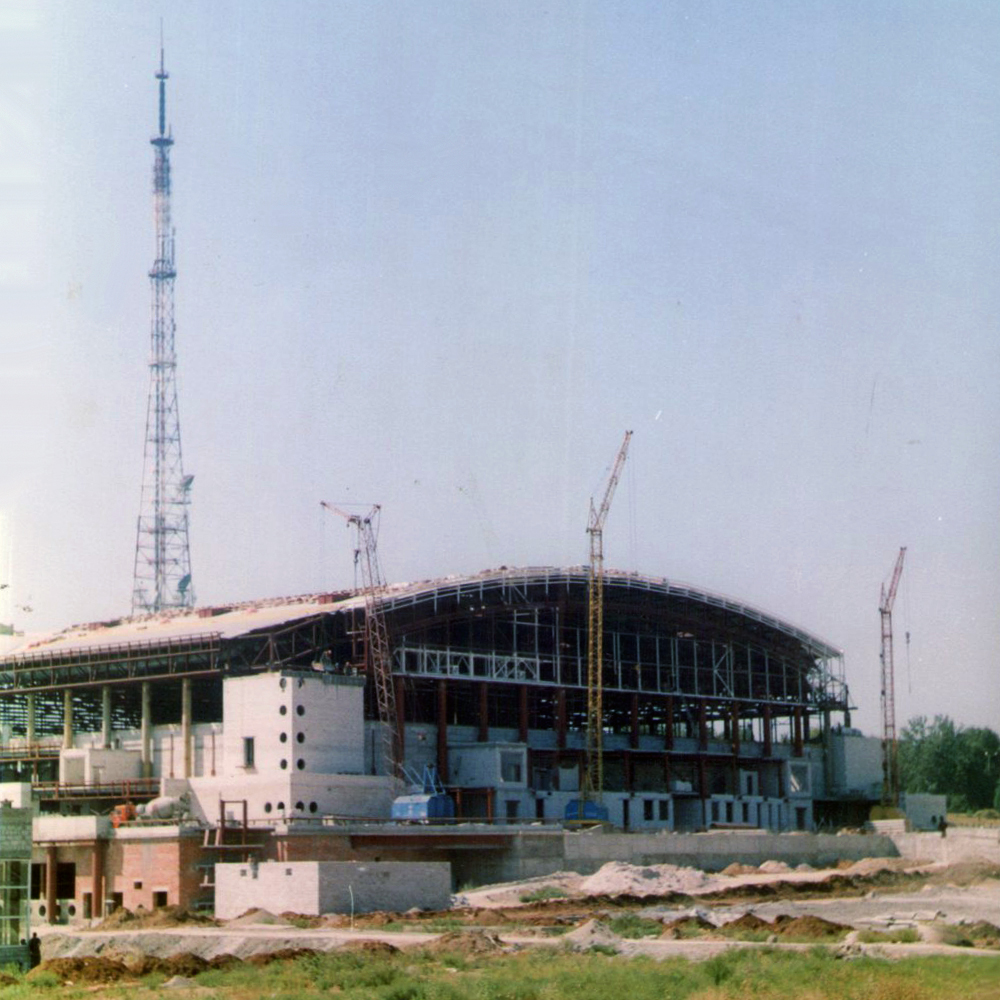
Construction in September 2006

Complex entrance

== See also ==
- List of football stadiums in Ukraine
