= Yuriy Benyo =

Ukrainian footballer

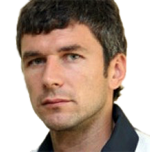

Personal information
- Full name: Yuriy Volodymyrovych Benio
- Date of birth: 25 April 1974 (age 52)
- Place of birth: Lviv, Soviet Union (now Ukraine)
- Height: 1.82 m (6 ft 0 in)
- Position: Defender

Senior career*
Years	Team	Apps	(Gls)
1992–1993	Silmash Lviv		
1993–1994	Sokil-LORTA Lviv (amateurs)	22	(0)
1994–1996	Haray Zhovkva	55	(6)
1996–1999	Karpaty Lviv	76	(2)
1997–1998	→ Karpaty-2 Lviv	7	(0)
1999	Lviv	3	(0)
1999–2000	Shakhtar Donetsk	8	(1)
1999	→ Shakhtar-2 Donetsk	3	(0)
2000–2002	Metalurh Zaporizhzhia	63	(2)
2000	→ SSSOR Metalurh Zaporizhzhia	1	(0)
2000–2001	→ Metalurh-2 Zaporizhzhia	4	(1)
2002–2005	Karpaty Lviv	58	(1)
2005	Venta	6	(0)
2005–2008	Arsenal Kyiv	85	(2)
2009	Naftusya Skhidnytsia (amateurs)	2	
2009	Volyn Lutsk	5	(0)
2010	Naftusya Skhidnytsia (amateurs)	9	(0)

Managerial career
- 2008–2009: Lviv (assistant)
- 2009: Lviv (youth)
- 2009: Lviv
- 2010–2011: Naftovyk-Ukrnafta Okhtyrka (assistant)
- 2012: Lviv (assistant)
- 2012–2014: Karpaty Lviv (scout)
- 2014–2015: Karpaty Lviv (sporting director)
- 2017: Celje (assistant)
- 2017: Ukraine U19 (assistant)
- 2017–2020: Mariupol (assistant)
- 2020–2022: Dnipro-1 (assistant)
- 2022–2023: Shakhtar Donetsk (assistant)
- 2023–2024: Al-Raed (assistant)
- 2024–2025: Ludogorets Razgrad (assistant)
- 2025–2026: Widzew Łódź (assistant)
- * Club domestic league appearances and goals

Yuriy Volodymyrovych Benyo (Ukrainian: Юрій Володимирович Беньо; born 25 April 1974) is a Ukrainian former professional footballer who played as a defender. He was most recently the assistant manager of Ekstraklasa club Widzew Łódź.

== Career ==
He played for Karpaty Lviv, Shakhtar Donetsk, Metalurh Zaporizhzhia and Arsenal Kyiv in the Ukrainian Premier League.
