= Viktor Ryashko (footballer, born 1964) =

Ukrainian footballer and coach (1964–2020)

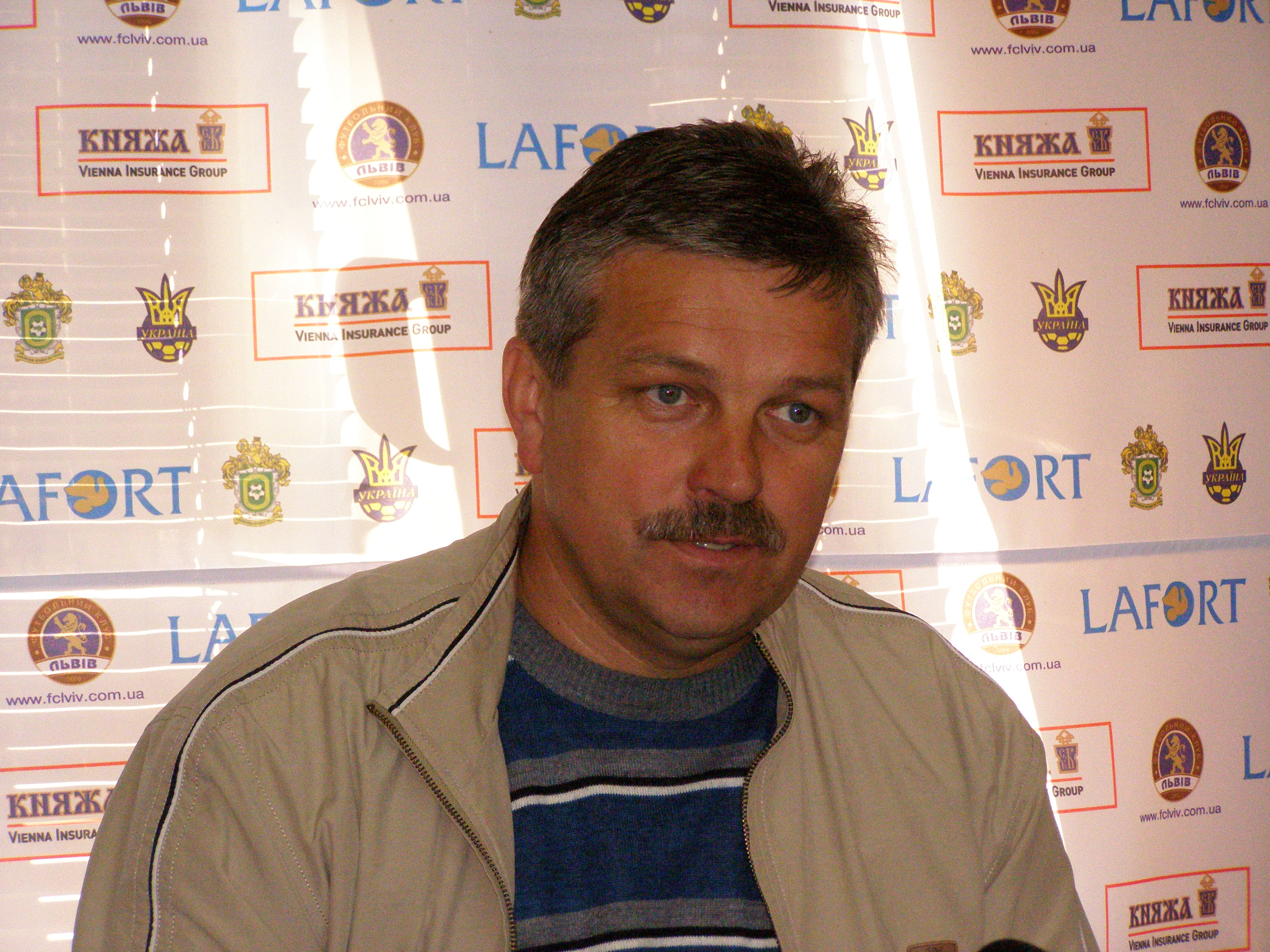

Personal information
- Full name: Viktor Ivanovych Ryashko
- Date of birth: 28 January 1964
- Place of birth: Mukachevo, Ukrainian SSR, Soviet Union
- Date of death: 19 July 2020 (aged 56)
- Place of death: near Ivanivtsi, Mukachevo Raion, Ukraine
- Height: 1.80 m (5 ft 11 in)
- Position: Midfielder

Youth career
- Pidhaitsi

Senior career*
Years	Team	Apps	(Gls)
1981	Nyva Pidhaitsi		
1982–1983	Bukovyna Chernivtsi	26	(1)
1983–1985	Nyva Ternopil	102	(6)
1987	Nyva Ternopil	9	(0)
1989	Kremin Kremenchuk	16	(0)
1994	Karpaty Mukacheve	1	(0)

Managerial career
- 1998–2000: Zakarpattia Uzhhorod
- 2000–2002: Zakarpattia Uzhhorod (assistant)
- 2002–2005: Zakarpattia Uzhhorod
- 2007–2008: Mukachevo
- 2008–2010: Nyva Ternopil
- 2010: Lviv (interim)
- 2012–2016: Hoverla Uzhhorod (sporting director)
- * Club domestic league appearances and goals

Viktor Ryashko (Ukrainian: Віктор Іванович Ряшко; 28 January 1964 – 19 July 2020) was a Ukrainian professional football player and coach.

== Career ==
He was a product of FC Trudovi Rezervy Lviv.

On 12 January 2012, Ryashko was appointed as the sporting director of club FC Hoverla Uzhhorod in Ukrainian Premier League.

He was the father of Ukrainian footballers Viktor Ryashko and Mykhaylo Ryashko.

Ryashko died on 19 July 2020, at the age of 56, after his car crashed during a road accident.
