= Mykhailo Stelmakh =

Ukrainian writer and playwright (1912–1983)

- Миха́йло Пана́сович Сте́льмах
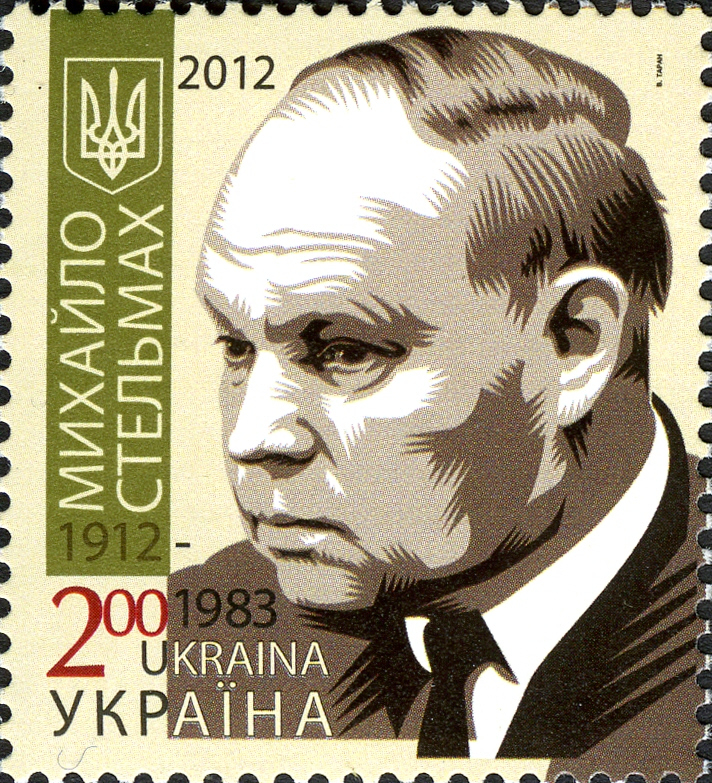
- Stelmakh featured on a 2012 Ukrainian stamp
- Born: 24 May [O.S. 11 May] 1912; Diakivtsi village, Litin uezd, Podolia Governorate, Russian Empire
- Died: 27 September 1983 (aged 71); Kyiv, Ukrainian SSR, USSR
- Citizenship: Ukrainian People's Republic → Soviet Union
- Education: Vinnytsia State Pedagogical University
- Occupations: Writer, novelist, playwright
- Writing career
- Language: Ukrainian
- Years active: 1941–1983
- Genre: Socialist realism

Mykhailo Panasovych Stelmakh (Ukrainian: Миха́йло Пана́сович Сте́льмах; 24 May [O.S. 11 May] 1912 – September 27, 1983) was a Ukrainian novelist, poet, and playwright. Member of the Writers' Union of the USSR, academician of the USSR Academy of Sciences (since March 29, 1978), Hero of Socialist Labour (May 23, 1972). Father of playwright Yaroslav Stelmakh. Member of the Supreme Soviet of the USSR of the 6th-10th convocations.

== Biography ==
He was born in the village of Dyakivtsi (now Lityn district of Vinnytsia region) in the family of a peasant, a veteran of the Russian-Japanese war Panas Stelmakh. His mother was Belarusian. After graduating from high school he studied at a pedagogical college. He began his career in the Vinnytsia newspaper "Bolshevik Truth".

In 1933 he graduated from the literary faculty of the Vinnytsia Pedagogical Institute (he was the first in the village to receive higher education) and until 1939 he taught in the villages of Kyiv region; In 1939 he was mobilized into the Red Army, a participant in the Eastern Front (World War II). As an artillery soldier who fought in Belarus, he was twice wounded. From 1944 he worked in the editorial office of the newspaper of the 1st Ukrainian Front "For the Honor of the Family". During the war in Voronezh and Ufa, two collections of frontline poems by Mykhail Stelmakh were published under the editorship of M. Rylsky: "Provesin", "Za yasny zori" (1942); in 1943, a book of short stories, Birch Juice, edited by Yuri Yanovsky, was published in Ufa.

After the war, at the invitation of the poet Maxim Rylsky, he became an employee of the Institute of Folklore, Ethnography and Art of the USSR Academy of Sciences (1945-1954). He was elected a deputy of the Supreme Soviet of the USSR of the 6th and 10th convocations, and was deputy chairman of the Council of Nationalities.

He lived in Kyiv in the house of Rolita writers on Lenina Street (now Bohdan Khmelnytsky), 68. He died on September 27, 1983, in Kyiv. Buried in Baikove Cemetery (plot No. 2). Authors of the tombstone sculptor Sogoyan, architects Stamo, Feshchenko.

There is also evidence of Stelmakh's ties to the Ukrainian underground. In particular, Oleksandr Ihorovych Muratov mentions this: “- As soon as he opened the door for me, I was stunned. He couldn't understand why I was looking at him so strangely. And I remembered everything at once: back in the fifty-first year I was a liaison of the Ukrainian Insurgent Army, and I had a transplant in Kyiv when I went either to Lviv or to Stanislav (now Ivano-Frankivsk). I was sent to this person at a certain address (at that time Stelmakh did not live where he was in the seventies, when "Swan Geese" was filmed), where I had to take a package - what was in it, I still do not know, I know it did not disclose. Then it was my second visit to Kyiv, I fulfilled the order and spent the rest of the time left before the train at the station so as not to "shine". The owner, before letting me into the apartment, asked the password several times, then he sewed an envelope in the lining of my jacket. Years passed - and I recognized the owner in Stelmakh... He had a very characteristic appearance, it was hard not to remember, but at the same time I was not entirely sure that it was him, because it was hard to believe - Laureate of the Lenin, Stalin, Shevchenko Prizes, Deputy of the Supreme Soviet of the USSR. ».

Other evidence also indirectly indicates this: Mykhailo Stelmakh was surprisingly well acquainted with the activities of the OUN-UPA and at least sympathized with this organization. Words of Doctor of Historical Sciences Volodymyr Serhiychuk, Professor of the Department of Ancient and Modern History of Ukraine, Kyiv National University. Taras Shevchenko: "Mykhailo Stelmakh would write truthfully about the OUN-UPA. He even tried to do it at the time, even within the strict framework of the party's ideological task. But he was not given the opportunity to tell at least a part of the truth about the UUN-UIA., when he got acquainted with the report of the head of the Main Committee of the USSR K. Polonnyk to the secretary of the Central Committee of the CP (b) U I. Nazarenko dated October 2, 1952:

== Awards and honours ==
- Order of the Patriotic War, 2nd class (16 June 1945)
- Stalin Prize, 3rd class (1951; for the novel Great Family)
- Three Orders of Lenin (24 November 1960; 28 October 1967; 23 May 1972)
- Lenin Prize (1961; for the trilogy Bread and Salt, Human Blood - Not Water, Great Family)
- Order of the Red Banner of Labour (5 June 1962)
- Order of the October Revolution (2 July 1971)
- Hero of Socialist Labour (23 May 1972)
- Shevchenko National Prize (1980; for the novel Four Fords)
- Order of Friendship of Peoples (21 May 1982)
