= Lafort Arena (Dobromyl) =

Football stadium in Ukraine

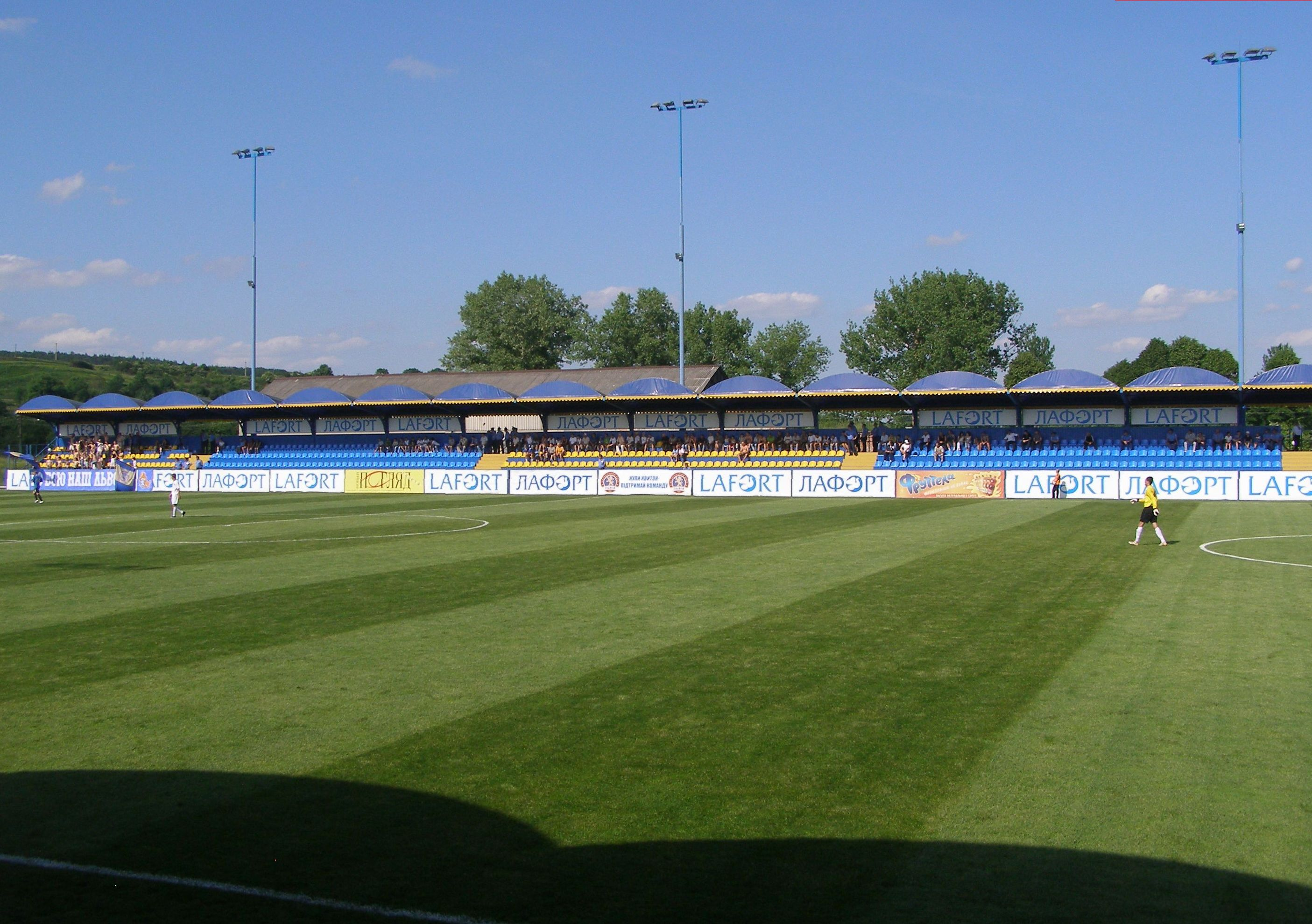
- Interactive map of Lafort Arena
- Former names: Torpedo Lviv Stadium; Knyazha Arena
- Location: Dobromyl, Lviv, Ukraine
- Coordinates: 49°34′00.00″N 22°45′0.00″E
- Capacity: 3,220
- Surface: Grass
- Field size: 105 m × 68 m (115 yd × 74 yd)

Construction
- Groundbreaking: 2006–07
- Opened: September 3, 2007 (renamed July 21, 2010)
- Closed: 2012

Tenant
- FC Lviv

Lafort Arena, formerly Knyazha Arena is football stadium in the city of Dobromyl, Lviv Oblast in Ukraine. It is the home ground of FC Lviv of the Ukrainian First League. The stadium was originally funded and owned by the insurance and brokerage firm "Knyazha" which used to own the football club. On July 21, 2010 the stadium was renamed to its new sponsors Lafort.

== History ==
The stadium was declared fit to hold Premier League matches in March 2009, but after atrocious conditions in their home game with Metalist Kharkiv which left the pitch and stadium damaged, the Football Federation of Ukraine barred further games until the pitch and stadium was brought up to league standard. The stadium was allowed again returned to hold Premier League games when FC Lviv hosted Kryvbas Kryvyi Rih in late April 2009.

The record attendance for a match at the ground is 3,220 between FC Lviv and MFC Mykolaiv on March 23, 2008. The stadium was also a venue for games involving Kniazha amateur team that plays in regional league of Lviv Oblast.
