= Dynamo Stadium (Kharkiv) =

Sports venue in Kharkiv, Ukraine

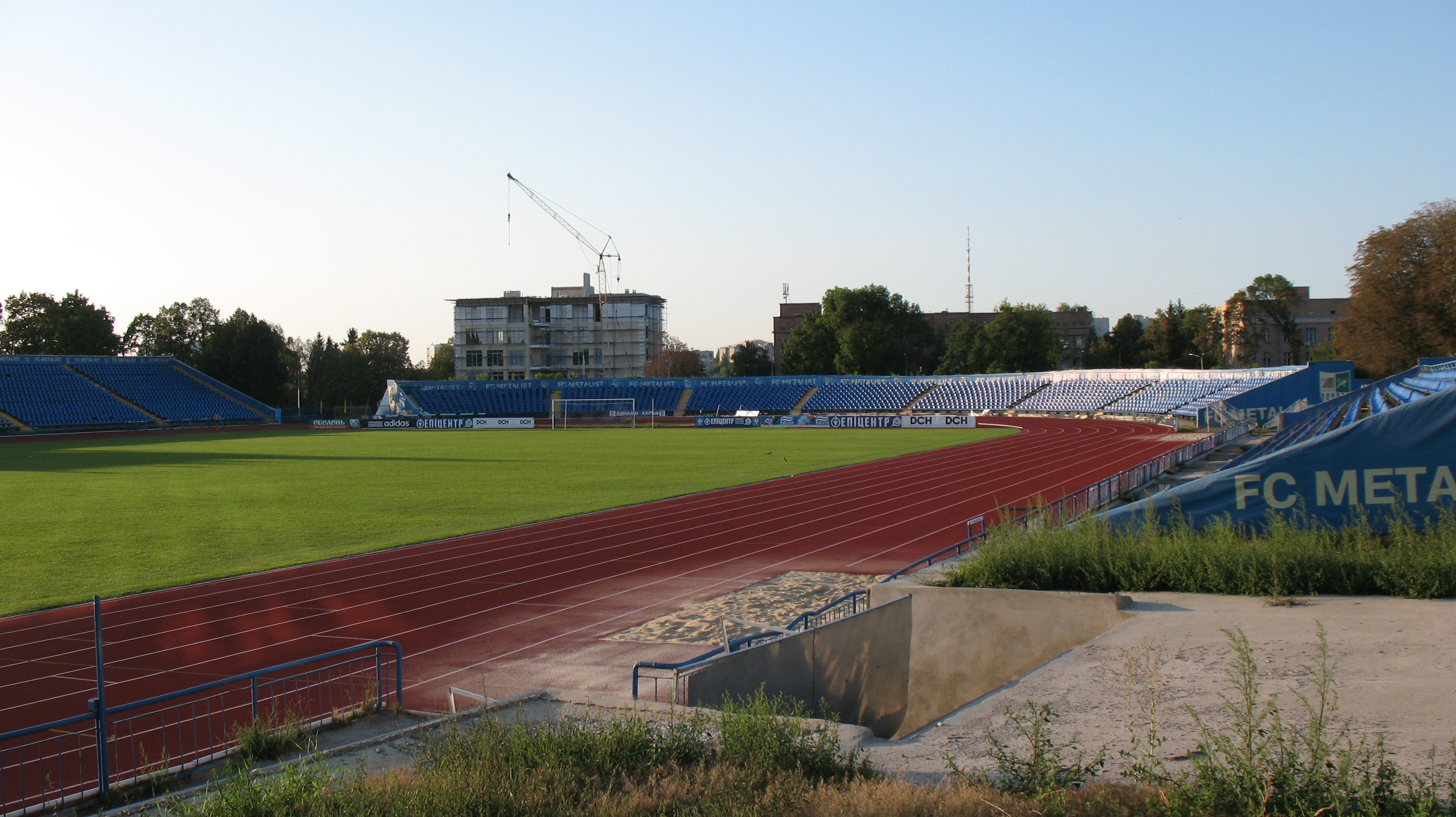
- Stadium in 2012
- Interactive map of Dynamo Stadium
- Location: Kharkiv, Ukraine
- Coordinates: 50°01′18.80″N 36°14′23.70″E
- Capacity: 8,792
- Surface: Grass
- Field size: 105 m × 68 m (344 ft × 223 ft)

Construction
- Opened: 1931
- Renovated: 1946, 1971, 2011

Tenants
- FC Metalist-2 Kharkiv (1997, 1998); FC Helios Kharkiv (2006–2008); FC Metalist Kharkiv (2008, 2009, 2011); FC Kharkiv (2008–2010); Metalist Kharkiv Reserves (2011–2016); Ukraine national rugby league team (2008 onwards)

Dynamo Stadium in Kharkiv, Ukraine was the home ground of several Kharkiv professional football clubs, such as FC Metalist Kharkiv, FC Helios Kharkiv and FC Kharkiv. The stadium is also used for home matches of the Ukraine national team for Rugby League matches.

== History ==
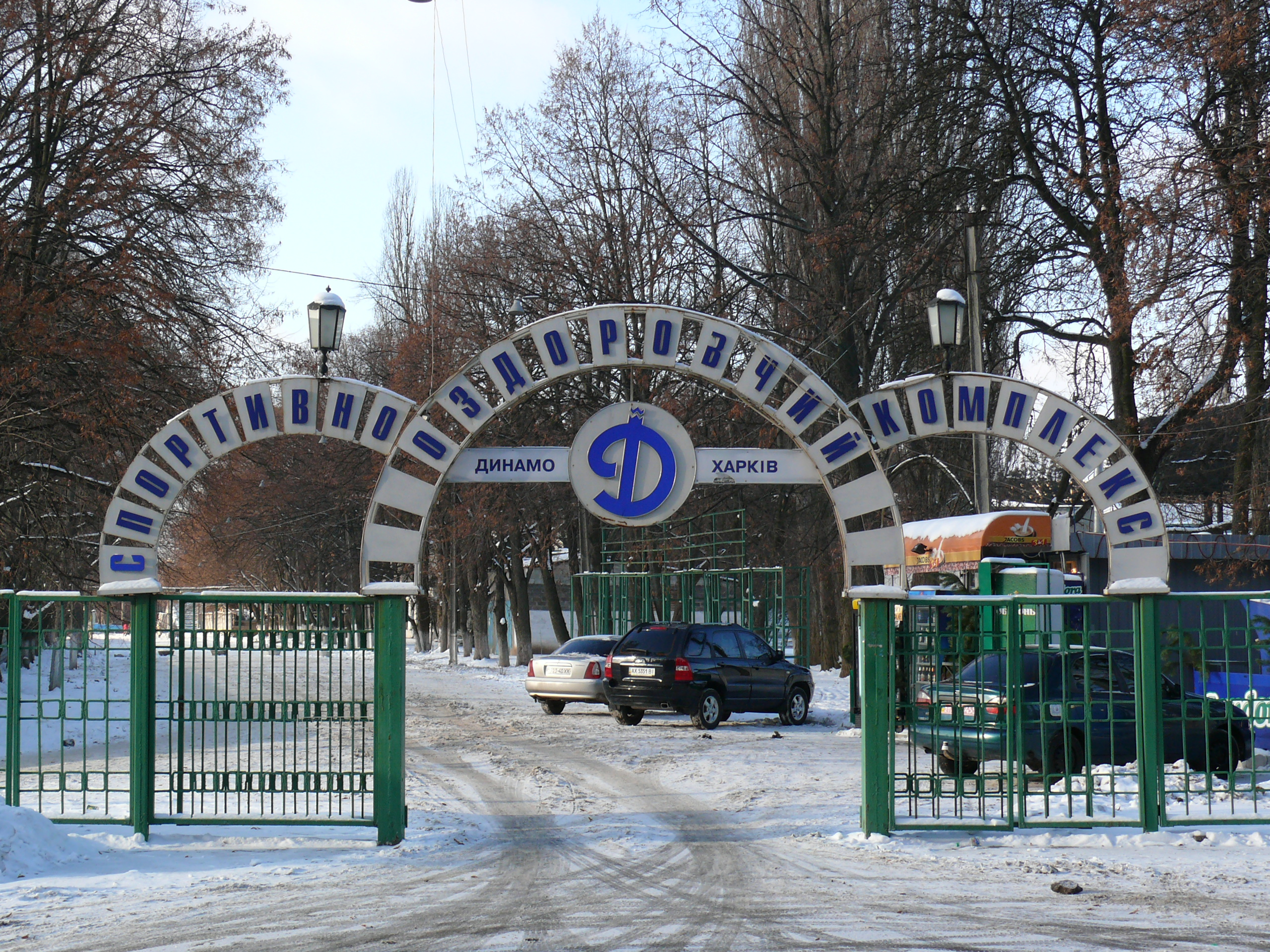
Gates to the stadium

The stadium was built in 1931 and was used by teams from Kharkiv in the Soviet Championship, including FC Dynamo Kharkiv and FC Lokomotyv Kharkiv.

The stadium was damaged during World War II, and later reconstructed. Lokomotiv Kharkiv, the predecessor to FC Metalist Kharkiv in the Soviet Top League, used the stadium until they moved to Metalist Stadium.

The stadium was repaired again in 1971, and was practically idle until 1997.

Until 2008, the stadium was used by FC Helios Kharkiv, who were leasing it from the municipal administration. At the beginning of 2008, the facility was sold to FC Kharkiv under the condition that the club would reconstruct it.

It was closed down for renovations in late 2008, forcing FC Helios to move out of Kharkiv. FC Kharkiv returned to the stadium in April 2009, upon the conclusion of the main phase of renovations.

== Today ==
The stadium was reconstructed in 2011.
