= List of Ukrainians in football active in Russian-occupied territories of Ukraine =

This is a list of Ukrainians in football who are or have been active in Russian-occupied territories of Ukraine, including players, coaches, and functionaries who have played, coached or developed football in Crimea and/or the Russian-occupied areas of Donetsk, Kherson, Luhansk, and Zaporizhzhia oblasts.

== Crimea ==
=== Players ===
- Oleksandr Zhabokrytskyi
- Anton Holenkov
- Yevhen Bredun
- Anton Monakhov
- Anton Shevchuk
- Oleksiy Kurilov
- Artur Novotryasov
- Arsen Ablyametov
- Andriy Haydash
- Artem Kultyshev
- Yevhen Odyntsov
- Stanislav Pechenkin
- Vladyslav Hevlych
- Andriy Kiva
- Roman Klymentovskyi
- Redvan Memeshev
- Matviy Bobal
- Serhiy Naumenko
- Petro Oparin
- Redvan Osmanov
- Oleh Solovych
- Serhiy Ferenchak
- Oleksiy Yablonskyi
- Illya Hlushytskyi
- Pavlo Hryshchenko
- Artur Zhyhulin
- Volodymyr Melnychenko
- Oleksandr Morev
- Maksym Prykhodnyi
- Vyacheslav Bazylevych
- Yuriy Pantya
- Ihor Buryak
- Ihor Zubko
- Oleksiy Hodin
- Illya Kozhemyakin
- Dmytro Khodarchenko
- Serhiy Shestakov (footballer, born 1994)
- Ivan Voitenko
- Dlyaver Nuridinov
- Denys Sytnikov
- Stepan Borhun
- Andriy Zborovskyi
- Ihor Solntsev
- Maksym Khablov
- Mykyta Kryukov
- Denys Danyuk
- Oleksandr Zeynalov
- Oleh Humenyuk
- Anton Shendrik
- Taras Chervonetskyi
- Vladimir Pisarsky
- Daniil Khlusevich
- Oleksiy Babyr
- Roman Voynarovskyi
- Vladimir Martynov
- Matviy Huyhanov
- Dmytro Matviyenko
- Rollan Pohoreltsev
- Oleksandr Masalov
- Stanislav Biblyk
- Ivan Ponomarenko
- Serhiy Chebotaryov
- Dmytro Nazarov
- Dmytro Brovkin
- Oleksiy Boyko
- Oleksandr Artemenko
- Ruslan Mamutov
- Oleksandr Oliynyk
- Volodymyr Romanenko

=== Coaches and functionaries ===
- Anatoliy Skvortsov
- Stanislav Hudzikevych
- Serhiy Shevchenko (footballer, born 1958)
- Serhiy Shevchenko (footballer, born May 1960)
- Vladimir Martynov
- Maksym Startsev
- Sergei Diyev
- Spartak Zhyhulin
- Oleh Kolesov
- Andriy Yudin
- Oleksandr Haydash
- Yuriy Svirkov
- Oleksiy Hrachov
- Vladyslav Maltsev
- Roman Voynarovskyi
- Enver Seidametov
- Oleh Leshchynskyi
- Oleksiy Kurilov
- Serhiy Yesin
- Oleksandr Zhabokrytskyi
- Valeriy Petrov
- Valeriy Chaly (footballer)
- Ihor Volkov
- Dmytro Nazarov
- Dmytro Brovkin
- Serhiy Lezhentsev
- Anton Monakhov

== Donetsk Oblast ==
=== Players ===
- Serhiy Artiukh
- Illya Hlushytskyi
- Pavlo Hryshchenko
- Nikita Khodorchenko
- Ruslan Levyha
- Oleksandr Varvanin
- Artem Yevlanov

=== Coaches and functionaries ===
- Yuriy Dehteryov
- Ihor Korol
- Ihor Petrov
- Artem Yevlanov
- Viktor Zvyahintsev

== Kherson Oblast ==
=== Coaches and functionaries ===
- Serhiy Shevchenko

== Luhansk Oblast ==
=== Players ===
- Andriy Komarytskyi
- Oleksandr Malyhin
- Serhiy Pivnenko
- Ivan Rudnytskyi
- Oleksandr Savanchuk
- Maksym Slyusar
- Oleksandr Varvanin

=== Coaches and functionaries ===
- Oleksandr Malyhin
- Yuriy Malyhin
- Ivan Rudnytskyi
- Vitaliy Rudnytskyi
- Oleksandr Savanchuk

== Zaporizhzhia Oblast ==
=== Players ===
- Pavlo Myahkov

=== Coaches and functionaries ===
- Pavlo Myahkov

== See also ==
- Crimean Premier League
