= 2012–13 Ukrainian Cup =

Kubok Ukrainy

Tournament details
- Country: Ukraine
- Dates: 25 July 2012 – 22 May 2013; 25 July – 22 August 2012 (preliminary rounds); 22 September 2012 – 22 May 2013 (main event)
- Teams: 55

Final positions
- Champions: Shakhtar Donetsk (9th title)
- Runners-up: Chornomorets Odesa
- Semifinalists: Dnipro Dnipropetrovsk; FC Sevastopol

Tournament statistics
- Matches played: 46
- Goals scored: 126 (2.74 per match)
- Top goal scorer(s): 4 goals (Brazil) Luiz Adriano & Alex Teixeira (Shakhtar)

The 2012–13 Ukrainian Cup was the 22nd annual season of Ukraine's football knockout competition.

The Cup began with two preliminary rounds, before the first round proper involving the Premier League clubs. The draw for both the preliminary rounds was held on 5 July 2012. The First Preliminary Round consisting of teams from Druha Liha and Amateur Cup finalists. In the Second Preliminary Round teams of the Persha Liha entered the competition. Sixteen teams, the winners of the 2nd preliminary round, entered the First Round proper or the Round of 32 where the Premier League teams entered the competition for the first time. The winner of the competition qualified for the play-off round (based on the UEFA club coefficient) of the 2013–14 UEFA Europa League.

== Team allocation ==
Fifty five teams entered into the Ukrainian Cup competition.

=== Distribution ===
	Teams entering in this round	Teams advancing from previous round
First qualifying round (18 teams)	16 participants of the Second League; 2 participants of the Amateur Cup final	
Second qualifying round (32 teams)	17 participants of the First League; 6 participants of the Second League	9 winners from the first qualifying round
Tournament proper (32 teams)	16 participants of the Premier League	16 winners from the second qualifying round

=== Round and draw dates ===
All draws held at FFU headquarters (Building of Football) in Kyiv unless stated otherwise.

Phase	Round	Draw date	Game date
Qualifying	First qualifying round	5 July 2012	25 July 2012
Qualifying	Second qualifying round	5 July 2012	22 August 2012
Main event	Round of 32	5 September 2012	22 September 2012^{(1)}
Main event	Round of 16	26 September 2012	31 October 2012
Main event	Quarter-finals	1 November 2012	17 April 2013
Main event	Semi-finals	19 April 2013	8 May 2013
Main event	Final	22 May 2013^{(2)}^{(3)} at OSK "Metalist", Kharkiv	

^(1) Originally scheduled on 23 September 2012

^(2) The final to be scheduled for 1 June 2013, if there is a necessity to conclude the Ukrainian Premier League season with a "Golden Match".

^(3) Originally scheduled for 30 May 2013, it was later planned to conduct on 1 June 2013. On 18 April 2013 the FFU Executive Committee rescheduled the match for 22 May 2013. On 24 April 2013 the FFU Executive Committee changed location of the final match from Olimpiysky in Kyiv to Metalist in Kharkiv.

=== Teams ===
Enter in First Round		Enter in Second Round		Enter in Round of 32
AAFU; 2 teams	PFL League 2; 16/26 teams	PFL League 2; 6/26 teams	PFL League 1; 17/18 teams	UPL; 16/16 teams
FC Bucha; Hvardiyets Hvardiyske	Bastion Illichivsk; Dynamo Khmelnytskyi; Hirnyk-Sport Komsomolsk; Kremin Kremenchuk; Krystal Kherson; Makiyivvuhillya Makiyivka; Myr Hornostayivka; Nyva Ternopil; Real Pharma Yuzhne; Skala Stryi; SKA Odesa*; Stal Dniprodzerzhynsk; FC Ternopil*; UkrAhroKom Pryiutivka; Yednist Plysky; Zhemchuzhyna Yalta*	Desna Chernihiv; Enerhiya Nova Kakhovka; Hirnyk Kryvyi Rih; FC Lviv; Shakhtar Sverdlovsk; Slavutych Cherkasy	Arsenal Bila Tserkva; Avanhard Kramatorsk; Bukovyna Chernivtsi; Helios Kharkiv; Krymteplytsia Molodizhne; MFC Mykolaiv; Naftovyk-Ukrnafta; Obolon Kyiv; FC Odesa; FC Oleksandriya; Olimpik Donetsk; FC Poltava; PFC Sevastopol; Stal Alchevsk; PFC Sumy; Tytan Armyansk; Zirka Kirovohrad	Arsenal Kyiv; Chornomorets Odesa; Dnipro Dnipropetrovsk; Dynamo Kyiv; Hoverla Uzhhorod; Karpaty Lviv; Kryvbas Kryvyi Rih; Illichivets Mariupol; Metalist Kharkiv; Metalurh Donetsk; Metalurh Zaporizhia; Shakhtar Donetsk; Tavriya Simferopol; Volyn Lutsk; Vorskla Poltava; Zorya Luhansk

Notes:

- With the asterisk (*) are noted the Second League teams that were recently admitted to the league from amateurs and the AAFU (amateur) team(s) that qualified in place of the Amateur Cup finalist(s).
- Reserve teams from the Second League: Shakhtar-3, Obolon-2, Poltava-2, Sevastopol-2, along with Dynamo-2 from the First League, were not included in the draw.
- Bastion Illichivsk has withdrawn just before the 2011–12 Ukrainian Second League but was included in the 2011–12 Ukrainian Cup draw. Despite not being able to participate in any professional competitions since then (2011), Bastion was again included in the 2012–13 Ukrainian Cup draw.

== Bracket ==
The following is the tournament bracket that demonstrates the last five rounds of the Ukrainian Cup, including the final match. Numbers in parentheses next to the match score represent the results of a penalty shoot-out.

Round of 32
Zhemchuzhyna Yalta	0
Dnipro Dnipropetrovsk	1
Stal Dniprodzerzhynsk	0
Illichivets Mariupol	6
Shakhtar Sverdlovsk	2
FC Odesa	1
Slavutych Cherkasy	1
Volyn Lutsk (a.e.t.)	3
Stal Alchevsk	2
Arsenal Kyiv (a.e.t.)	3
Avanhard Kramatorsk (p)	1 (4)
Zorya Luhansk	1 (3)
UkrAhroKom Pryiutivka (p)	1 (5)
Metalurh Zaporizhia	1 (4)
Chornomorets Odesa	2
Metalurh Donetsk	0
Hirnyk-Sport Komsomolsk	0
Tavriya Simferopol	2
Desna Chernihiv	1
Vorskla Poltava	2
FC Sevastopol	2
Kryvbas Kryvyi Rih	1
Kremin Kremenchuk	0
Nyva Ternopil	2
Obolon Kyiv	1
Metalist Kharkiv	4
Krymteplytsia Molodizhne	0
Karpaty Lviv	2
Helios Kharkiv	0
Hoverla Uzhhorod	1
Shakhtar Donetsk	4
Dynamo Kyiv	1

Round of 16
Dnipro Dnipropetrovsk	2
Illichivets Mariupol	0
Shakhtar Sverdlovsk	0
Volyn Lutsk	2
Avanhard Kramatorsk	0
Arsenal Kyiv	1
UkrAhroKom Pryiutivka	1
Chornomorets Odesa	2
Vorskla Poltava	2
Tavriya Simferopol	3
Nyva Ternopil	0
FC Sevastopol	2
Karpaty Lviv (a.e.t.)	2
Metalist Kharkiv	1
Hoverla Uzhhorod	1
Shakhtar Donetsk	4

Quarter-finals
Volyn Lutsk	0
Dnipro Dnipropetrovsk	2
Arsenal Kyiv	1
Chornomorets Odesa	2
PFC Sevastopol (p)	1 (4)
Tavriya Simferopol	1 (1)
Shakhtar Donetsk	2
Karpaty Lviv	1

Semi-finals
Chornomorets Odesa	2
Dnipro Dnipropetrovsk	1
PFC Sevastopol	2
Shakhtar Donetsk	4

Final
22 May – Kharkiv
Chornomorets Odesa	0
Shakhtar Donetsk	3

== Competition schedule ==
=== First Preliminary Round (1/64) ===
In this round entered 16 clubs from the Druha Liha and the finalists of Ukrainian Amateur Cup. The round matches were played on 25 July 2012.

25 July 2012	Skala Stryi (2L)	0–1	(2L) Dynamo Khmelnytskyi	Stryi, Lviv Oblast
17:00	Basarab (penalty missed) 5'; Rustamov (yellow card) 82' (yellow-red card) 87'	Report	Rudenko 77'; Honchar (yellow card) 65' (yellow-red card) 87'	Stadium: Sokil; Attendance: 1,300; Referee: Pavlo Dubrovets (Zhytomyr)

25 July 2012	Makiyivvuhillya Makiyivka (2L)	1–1 (a.e.t.) (3–5 p)	(2L) Hirnyk-Sport Komsomolsk	Makiivka, Donetsk Oblast
17:00	Tsykhmeystruk 60' (pen.)	Report	Sereda 40'	Stadium: FC Shakhtar academy Attendance: 200; Referee: Serhiy Hulyaev (Illichivsk)
	Penalties
	Morev (penalty scored); Netser (penalty missed); Lohinov (penalty scored); Tsykhmeystruk (penalty scored)		(penalty scored) Dyachenko; (penalty scored) Holyadynets; (penalty scored) Bodzhhua; (penalty scored) Maznyi; (penalty scored) Lapa

25 July 2012	Real Pharm Yuzhne (2L)	0–1	(2L) Nyva Ternopil	Yuzhne, Odesa Oblast
17:00		Report	Lakusta 47'	Stadium: Shkilnyi; Attendance: 100; Referee: Yuriy Ivanov (Makiivka)

25 July 2012	FC Bucha (AM)	1–2	(2L) UkrAhroKom Pryiutivka	Bucha, Kyiv Oblast
18:00	Zakarlyuka 87' (pen.)	Report	Hryshchenko 51', 90+4'	Stadium: Yuvileinyi; Attendance: 400; Referee: Dmytro Kononov (Donetsk)

25 July 2012	Kremin Kremenchuk (2L)	4–0	(2L) Yednist Plysky	Kremenchuk, Poltava Oblast
18:10	Volha 17', 40'; Barba 63'; Pasichnychenko 69'	Report		Stadium: Kremin Arena; Attendance: 1,200; Referee: Pavlo Pochepetskyi (Dnipro)

25 July 2012	SKA Odesa (2L)	0–2	(2L) Zhemchuzhyna Yalta	Odesa
18:00	Polyakhov (penalty missed) 67'	Report	Korolkov 36' (pen.); Kolodin 43'	Stadium: Spartak; Attendance: 500; Referee: Oleksandr Sakhno (Kyiv)

25 July 2012	Krystal Kherson (2L)	3–1	(2L) FC Ternopil	Kherson
18:00	Sitalo 56'; Nikishchenko 58'; Mazurenko 59' (pen.)	Report	Trofimchuk 21' (pen.)	Stadium: Krystal; Attendance: 500; Referee: Pavlo Pochepetskyi (Dnipro)

25 July 2012	Stal Dniprodzerzhynsk (2L)	+/- (3–0)^{(3)}	(2L) Myr Hornostayivka	Dniprodzerzhynsk, Dnipropetrovsk Oblast
		Report		Stadium: Metalurh

25 July 2012	Hvardiyets Hvardiyske (AM)	+/- (3–0)^{(4)}	(2L) Bastion Illichivsk	Hvardiyske, Autonomous Republic of Crimea
		Report

Notes:

^(3) Myr Hornostayivka informed the PFL that they will not travel for the scheduled match.(19 July 2012) Stal Dniprodzerzhynsk win the match with a 3–0 technical victory and advance into the next round.

^(4) Hvardiyets Hvardiyske were drawn to play away against FC Bastion Illichivsk but they were omitted from the professional ranks prior to the start of the 2012–13 season.(13 July 2012) Hvardiyets Hvardiyske receive a bye into the next round.

=== Second Preliminary Round (1/32) ===
In this round entered all 17 clubs from Persha Liha (except Dynamo-2 Kyiv) and the higher seeded clubs from the Druha Liha (top four of each group). They were drawn against the nine winners of the First Preliminary Round. The matches were played 22 August 2012.

22 August 2012	Hirnyk Kryvyi Rih (2L)	1–3	(1L) Stal Alchevsk	Kryvyi Rih, Dnipropetrovsk Oblast
17:00	Pashkovskyi 40'	Report	Sikorskyi 68'; Akymenko 45', 84'	Stadium: Shakhty "Zhovtneva"; Attendance: 500; Referee: Serhiy Berezka (Kyiv)

22 August 2012	Nyva Ternopil (2L)	1–1 (a.e.t.) (4–2 p)	(1L) Zirka Kirovohrad	Ternopil
17:00	Yanevych 5'	Report	Nasibulin 47'; Nemchaninov (red card) 100'	Stadium: Ternopilskyi Miskyi; Attendance: 2,500; Referee: Andriy Hrysyo (Lviv)
	Penalties
	Yanevych (penalty scored); Osmanov (penalty scored); Kushka (penalty scored); Lakusta (penalty scored)		(penalty missed) Halenko; (penalty missed) Rodina; (penalty scored) Olefir; (penalty scored) Rudnytskyi

22 August 2012	FC Odesa (1L)	3–2 (a.e.t.)	(1L) FC Poltava	Odesa
17:10	Malin 13', 43'; Parkhomenko 97' (pen.)	Report	Siryk 86' (pen.), 89' (pen.); Nuridinov (yellow card) 90+3' (yellow-red card) 112'	Stadium: Spartak; Attendance: 400; Referee: Andriy Yablonskyi (Ternopil)

22 August 2012	Helios Kharkiv (1L)	3–0	(1L) Olimpik Donetsk	Kharkiv
19:00	Kandaurov 45'; Khudobyak 59'; Kachur 77'	Report		Stadium: Sonyachnyi; Attendance: 550; Referee: Oleksiy Drachov (Chernihiv)

22 August 2012	Krystal Kherson (2L)	0–1	(1L) Krymteplytsya Molodizhne	Kherson
17:00		Report	Symonchuk 90+2'	Stadium: Krystal; Attendance: 1,700; Referee: Kateryna Monzul (Kharkiv)

22 August 2012	FC Sevastopol (1L)	1–0	(1L) Bukovyna Chernivtsi	Sevastopol
19:00	Danishevsky 8'	Report		Stadium: SC Sevastopol; Attendance: 5,560; Referee: Serhiy Skrypak (Kyiv)

22 August 2012	Obolon Kyiv (1L)	2–0	(1L) Arsenal Bila Tserkva	Kyiv
18:45	Pyshchur 25'; Kochura 81'	Report		Stadium: Obolon Arena; Attendance: 1,000; Referee: Artem Nozdrachov (Kharkiv)

22 August 2012	Zhemchuzhyna Yalta (2L)	2–2 (a.e.t.) (4–2 p)	(1L) Tytan Armyansk	Yalta, Autonomous Republic of Crimea
16:00	Povalchuk 9'	Report	Prokopchenko 21'; Dovzhyk 97'; Pokosenko 110' (o.g.)	Stadium: Avanhard; Attendance: 1,000; Referee: Oleksandr Pavlyuk (Kyiv)
	Penalties
	Kozhemyakin (penalty scored); Rafalskyi (penalty scored); Nelin (penalty scored); Shakhov (penalty scored)		(penalty scored) Dovzhyk; (penalty missed) Pokosenko; (penalty missed) Prokopchenko; (penalty scored) Subochev

22 August 2012	Shakhtar Sverdlovsk (2L)	2–1 (a.e.t.)	(1L) PFC Oleksandria	Sverdlovsk, Luhansk Oblast
17:00	Taranukha 65'; Nosaryev 102'	Report	Polyarus 23'; Havrysh (red card) 113'	Stadium: imeni Horyushkina; Attendance: 1,600; Referee: Roman Bokhnyak (Sevastopol)

22 August 2012	Hvardiyets Hvardiyske^{(5)} (AM)	1–3	(2L) UkrAhroKom Pryiutivka	Hvardiyske, Autonomous Republic of Crimea
16:00	Holoveshchenko 25'	Report	Falkovskyi 65'; Kalinovskyi 74'; Lomko 79'	Stadium: Hvardiyets; Attendance: 300; Referee: Oleksandr Omelchenko (Slovyansk)

22 August 2012	Hirnyk-Sport Komsomolsk (2L)	2–0	(1L) Naftovyk-Ukrnafta Okhtyrka	Komsomolsk, Poltava Oblast
17:00	Sereda 49' (pen.); Solonynko 88'	Report		Stadium: Yunist; Attendance: 500; Referee: Yuriy Synyshyn (Ivano-Frankivsk)

22 August 2012	Dynamo Khmelnytskyi (2L)	0–2	(2L) Desna Chernihiv	Khmelnytskyi
18:00	Ostapenko (yellow card) 4' (yellow-red card) 90+4'	Report	Chernenko 71'; Brovkin 88'	Stadium: Podillia; Attendance: 900; Referee: Yaroslav Byts (Lviv)

22 August 2012	Enerhiya Nova Kakhovka (2L)	0–1 (a.e.t.)	(2L) Slavutych Cherkasy	Nova Kakhovka, Kherson Oblast
17:05		Report	Vayda 101'	Stadium: Enerhiya; Attendance: 1,500; Referee: Pavlo Pochepetskyi (Dnipropetrovsk)

22 August 2012	Avanhard Kramatorsk (1L)	1–0	(1L) FC Sumy	Kramatorsk, Donetsk Oblast
17:50	Kozban 87'	Report	Melnyk (red card) 77'	Stadium: Avanhard; Attendance: 1,000; Referee: Oleksandr Holovkov (Severodonetsk)

22 August 2012	Kremin Kremenchuk (2L)	2–1	(1L) MFK Mykolaiv	Kremenchuk, Poltava Oblast
17:00	Volha 54'; Ivlyev 64'	Report	Hudzikevych 75' (pen.)	Stadium: Kremin Arena; Attendance: 1,500; Referee: Andriy Kutakov (Brovary)

22 August 2012	Stal Dniprodzerzhynsk (2L)	w/o^{(6)}	(2L) FC Lviv	Dniprodzerzhynsk, Dnipropetrovsk Oblast
		Report		Stadium: Metalurh

Notes:

^(5) Hvardiyets Hvardiyske were originally drawn to be the away side. However, the PFL regulations for the draw determine that a team from a lower level are designated as the home team. Match was played in Hvardiyske.

^(6) On 5 July 2012 Stal Dniprodzerzhynsk were originally drawn to play away against FC Lviv but on 12 July 2012 they withdrew from the professional ranks prior to the start of the 2012–13 season. Stal Dniprodzerzhynsk receive a bye and advance to the First Round of the Cup competition.

=== Round of 32 ===
In this round all 16 teams from the Premier League entered the competition. They and the 16 winners from the previous round consisting of seven clubs from the Persha Liha and nine clubs from the Druha Liha were drawn in this round. The draw took place 5 September 2012 and was performed by Volodymyr Troshkin who was invited as a guest by the Premier League.

22 September 2012	Stal Alchevsk (1L)	2–3 (a.e.t.)	(PL) Arsenal Kyiv	Alchevsk, Luhansk Oblast
16:30	Stepanyuk 40'; Hrytsay 116'	Report	Homenyuk 68', 100'; Kobakhidze 111'	Stadium: Stal; Attendance: 4,000; Referee: Andriy Yablonskyi (Ternopil)

22 September 2012	Chornomorets Odesa (PL)	2–0	(PL) Metalurh Donetsk	Odesa
19:00	Burdujan 50'; Matos 52'	Report		Stadium: Chornomorets; Attendance: 16,058; Referee: Serhiy Lysenchuk (Kyiv)

23 September 2012	Shakhtar Sverdlovsk (2L)	2–1	(1L) FC Odesa	Sverdlovsk, Luhansk Oblast
15:00	Fatiy 35'; Korobkin 61'	Report	Kalitov 57'	Stadium: imeni Horyushkina; Attendance: 3,000; Referee: Volodymyr Bondar (Kharkiv)

23 September 2012	Avanhard Kramatorsk (1L)	1–1 (a.e.t.) (4–3 p)	(PL) Zorya Luhansk	Kramatorsk, Donetsk Oblast
15:00	Skarlosh 78'	Report	Khudzik 39'	Stadium: Avanhard; Attendance: 5,000; Referee: Yuriy Foshchyi (Cherkasy)
	Penalties
	Malysh (penalty scored); Dotsenko (penalty scored); Kozban (penalty scored); Brynko (penalty missed); Sharko (penalty scored)		(penalty scored) Ljubenović; (penalty missed) Danilo; (penalty scored) Ferenchak; (penalty missed) Idahor; (penalty scored) Khudzik

23 September 2012	Stal Dniprodzerzhynsk (2L)	0–6	(PL) Illichivets Mariupol	Dniprodzerzhynsk, Dnipropetrovsk Oblast
15:00		Report	Fomin 17', 50', 56'; Kozhanov 38'; Hrechyshkin 62'; Putivtsev 82'	Stadium: Metalurh; Attendance: 1,000; Referee: Serhiy Skrypak (Kyiv Oblast)

23 September 2012	Zhemchuzhyna Yalta (2L)	0–1	(PL) Dnipro Dnipropetrovsk	Yalta, Autonomous Republic of Crimea
16:00		Report	Kalinić 15'	Stadium: Avanhard; Attendance: 3,700; Referee: Serhiy Skyrda (Kharkiv)

23 September 2012	Desna Chernihiv (2L)	1–2	(PL) Vorskla Poltava	Chernihiv
16:00	Kondratyuk 90+5'	Report	Januzi 9'; Budnik 45+1'	Stadium: imeni Haharyna; Attendance: 3,100; Referee: Ivan Bondar (Kyiv)

23 September 2012	Kremin Kremenchuk (2L)	0–2	(2L) Nyva Ternopil	Kremenchuk, Poltava Oblast
16:00		Report	Kabanov 8'; Voitovych 30' (pen.)	Stadium: Kremin Arena; Attendance: 1,500; Referee: Yuriy Synyshyn (Ivano-Frankivsk)

23 September 2012	Hirnyk-Sport Komsomolsk (2L)	0–2	(PL) Tavriya Simferopol	Komsomolsk, Poltava Oblast
16:00		Report	Humenyuk 68'; Shynder 76'	Stadium: Yunist; Attendance: 2,000; Referee: Mykola Kryvonosov (Kyiv)

23 September 2012	Helios Kharkiv (1L)	0–1	(PL) Hoverla Uzhhorod	Kharkiv
16:00		Report	Balafas 78'	Stadium: Sonyachniy Stadium; Attendance: 1,200; Referee: Serhiy Berezka (Kyiv Oblast)

23 September 2012	UkrAhroKom Pryiutivka (2L)	1–1 (a.e.t.) (5–4 p)	(PL) Metalurh Zaporizhya	Oleksandria, Kirovohrad Oblast
17:00	Falkovskiy 47'	Report	Junior 45' (pen.)	Stadium: CSC Nika Stadium^{(7)} Attendance: 4,200; Referee: Ihor Paskhal (Kherson)
	Penalties
	Ponomarenko (penalty scored); Falkovskyi (penalty scored); Batrachenko (penalty scored); Radevych (penalty scored); Belousov (penalty scored)		(penalty scored) Junior; (penalty scored) Partsvania; (penalty scored) Purović; (penalty scored) Sydorchuk; (penalty missed) Kaverin

23 September 2012	Slavutych Cherkasy (2L)	1–3 (a.e.t.)	(PL) Volyn Lutsk	Cherkasy
17:15	Hud 88'	Report	Owonikoko 90+4'; Nasonov 95'; Pavlov 97'	Stadium: Tsentralnyi; Attendance: 9,500; Referee: Dmytro Zhukov (Donetsk)

23 September 2012	FC Sevastopol (1L)	2–1	(PL) Kryvbas Kryvyi Rih	Sevastopol
18:00	Kuznetsov 45+2'; Karavayev 72'	Report	Samodin 60'	Stadium: SK Sevastopol; Attendance: 5,563; Referee: Yaroslav Kozyk (Mukachevo)

23 September 2012	Krymteplytsia Molodizhne (1L)	0–2	(PL) Karpaty Lviv	Simferopol, Autonomous Republic of Crimea
18:00		Report	Štilić 56'; Kopolovets 90+3'	Stadium: Krymteplytsia; Attendance: 1,300; Referee: Viktor Shvetsov (Odesa)

23 September 2012	Obolon Kyiv (1L)	1–4	(PL) Metalist Kharkiv	Kyiv
18:00	Kotenko 74'	Report	Marlos 2', 64'; Vorobey 37'; Shelayev 77'	Stadium: Obolon Arena; Attendance: 3,500; Referee: Andriy Lisakovskyi (Odesa)

23 September 2012	Shakhtar Donetsk (PL)	4–1	(PL) Dynamo Kyiv	Donetsk
19:30	Luiz Adriano 22'; Teixeira 41'; Fernandinho 76'; Srna 83'	Report	Taiwo 27'	Stadium: Donbas Arena; Attendance: 47,571; Referee: Anatoliy Zhabchenko (Simferopol)

Notes:

^(7) Fixture played at the CSC Nika Stadium located in the district center of Oleksandria, since the home ground has limited capacity.

=== Round of 16 ===
In this round the 16 winners from the previous round consisting of 11 teams from the Premier League, two clubs from the Persha Liha and three clubs from the Druha Liha were drawn in this round. The draw took place 26 September 2012 and was performed by Mykhailo Fomenko who was invited as a guest by the Premier League.

31 October 2012	Shakhtar Sverdlovsk (2L)	0–2	(PL) Volyn Lutsk	Sverdlovsk, Luhansk Oblast
13:00		Report	Subotić 4' (pen.); Stević 62'	Stadium: imeni Horyushkina; Attendance: 3,100; Referee: Yuriy Foshchyi (Cherkasy)

31 October 2012	Avanhard Kramatorsk (1L)	0–1	(PL) Arsenal Kyiv	Kramatorsk, Donetsk Oblast
14:00		Report	Kobakhidze 85'	Stadium: Avanhard; Attendance: 4,100; Referee: Roman Bokhnyak (Sevastopol)

31 October 2012	Vorskla Poltava (PL)	2–3	(PL) Tavriya Simferopol	Poltava
16:30	Bezus 60'; Budnik 63'	Report	Humenyuk 1'; Ljubičić 28'; Nazarenko 32'	Stadium: Vorskla imeni Butovskoho; Attendance: 1,500; Referee: Vitaliy Romanov (Dnipropetrovsk)

31 October 2012	UkrAhroKom Pryiutivka (2L)	1–2	(PL) Chornomorets Odesa	Oleksandria, Kirovohrad Oblast
18:00	Kalinovskyi 48'	Report	Politylo 14'; Bakaj 67'	Stadium: CSC Nika Stadium^{(8)} Attendance: 4,000; Referee: Ivan Bondar (Kyiv)

31 October 2012	Dnipro Dnipropetrovsk (PL)	2–0	(PL) Illichivets Mariupol	Dnipropetrovsk
18:30	Matheus 50'; Giuliano 75'	Report		Stadium: Dnipro Arena; Attendance: 7,651; Referee: Yuriy Morzharovskyi (Lviv)

31 October 2012	Nyva Ternopil (2L)	0–2	(1L) FC Sevastopol	Ternopil
19:00		Report	Koval 4', 48'	Stadium: Ternopilskyi Miskyi; Attendance: 8,000; Referee: Oleksandr Holovkov (Sievierodonetsk)

31 October 2012	Hoverla Uzhhorod (PL)	1–4	(PL) Shakhtar Donetsk	Uzhhorod
19:15	López 55' (pen.)	Report	Fernandinho 48'; Teixeira 68'; Luiz Adriano 72'; Willian 75' (pen.)	Stadium: Avanhard; Attendance: 8,000; Referee: Kostyantyn Trukhanov (Kharkiv)

31 October 2012	Karpaty Lviv (PL)	2–1 (a.e.t.)	(PL) Metalist Kharkiv	Lviv
20:30	Štilić 77'; Kenia 107'	Report	Cristaldo 72'	Stadium: Ukraina; Attendance: 21,300; Referee: Yuriy Moisechuk (Chernivtsi)

Notes:

^(8) Fixture played at the CSC Nika Stadium located in the district center of Oleksandria, since the home ground has limited capacity.

=== Quarterfinals ===
In this round entered the eight winners from the previous round consisting of seven teams from the Premier League and a club from the Persha Liha were drawn in this round. The draw took place 1 November 2012 and was performed by former Ukrainian international player Ivan Hetsko but due unforeseen circumstance was not able attend the draw. The draw was performed by former Ukrainian international player Vladyslav Vashchuk.

17 April 2013	Volyn Lutsk (PL)	0–2	(PL) Dnipro Dnipropetrovsk	Lutsk
17:30		Report	Kravchenko 45+3'; Matheus 90+3'	Stadium: Avanhard; Attendance: 3,880; Referee: Kostyantyn Trokhanov (Kharkiv)

17 April 2013	FC Sevastopol (1L)	1–1 (a.e.t.) (4–1 p)	(PL) Tavriya Simferopol	Sevastopol
18:00	Kovpak 23'	Report	Gadzhiev 55'	Stadium: SK Sevastopol; Attendance: 5,800; Referee: Yevhen Aranovskiy (Kyiv)
	Penalties
	Karnoza (penalty scored); Zhabokrytskyy (penalty scored); Kozhanov (penalty scored); Neplyakh (penalty scored)		(penalty missed) Gómez; (penalty missed) Eduardo; (penalty scored) Gadzhiev

17 April 2013	Shakhtar Donetsk (PL)	2–1	(PL) Karpaty Lviv	Donetsk
19:00	Hai 33'; Teixeira 43'	Report	Zenjov 79' (pen.)	Stadium: Donbass Arena; Attendance: 29,312; Referee: Serhiy Berezka (Kyiv)

17 April 2013	Arsenal Kyiv (PL)	1–2	(PL) Chornomorets Odesa	Kyiv
20:00	Tkachuk 45+2'	Report	Burdujan 6'; Fontanello 76'	Stadium: Dynamo imeni Lobanovskoho; Attendance: 1,600; Referee: Yuri Mozharovsky (Lviv)

=== Semifinals ===
In this round entered the four winners from the previous round consisting of three teams from the Premier League and a club from the Persha Liha were drawn in this round. The draw took place 19 April 2013 and was performed by former Ukrainian international player Ivan Hetsko. The home team for the final was selected as the winner of Sevastopol – Shakhtar match.

8 May 2013	Sevastopol (1L)	2–4	(PL) Shakhtar Donetsk	Sevastopol
	Tkachev 37', 72'	Report	Luiz Adriano 8', 65'; Mkhitaryan 19', 53'	Stadium: SC Sevastopol; Attendance: 5,576; Referee: Yuriy Mozharovsky (Lviv)

8 May 2013	Chornomorets Odesa (PL)	2–1	(PL) Dnipro Dnipropetrovsk	Odesa
	Fontanello 62'; Matos 68'	Report	Matheus 8'	Stadium: Chornomorets; Attendance: 25,123; Referee: Anatoliy Abdula (Kharkiv)

=== Final ===
22 May 2013

Shakhtar Donetsk (PL)	3–0	(PL) Chornomorets Odesa
Fernandinho 41'; Teixeira 53'; Taison 73'

Metalist Stadium, Kharkiv
Attendance: 40,003
Referee: Yevhen Aranovskiy (Kyiv)

== Top goalscorers ==
The competition's top ten goalscorers including qualification rounds.

As of 22 May 2013

#	Scorer	Goals (Pen.)	Team
1	(Brazil) Luiz Adriano	4	Shakhtar Donetsk
1	(Brazil) Alex Teixeira	4	Shakhtar Donetsk
3	(Brazil) Fernandinho	3	Shakhtar Donetsk
3	(Ukraine) Ruslan Fomin	3	Illichivets Mariupol
3	(Brazil) Matheus	3	Dnipro Dnipropetrovsk
3	(Ukraine) Yevhen Volha	3	Kremin Kremenchuk

== See also ==
- 2012–13 Ukrainian Premier League
- 2012–13 Ukrainian First League
- 2012–13 Ukrainian Second League
- 2012–13 UEFA Europa League
