= 2010–11 Ukrainian Premier League =

20th season of top-tier football league in Vyshcha Liha

Ukrainian Premier League
- Season: 2010–11
- Champions: Shakhtar Donetsk; 6th title
- Relegated: Metalurh Zaporizhzhia; Sevastopol
- Champions League: Shakhtar Donetsk; Dynamo Kyiv
- Europa League: Metalist Kharkiv; Dnipro Dnipropetrovsk; Karpaty Lviv; Vorskla Poltava
- Matches: 240
- Goals: 609 (2.54 per match)
- Top goalscorer: 17 – Yevhen Seleznyov (Dnipro)
- Biggest home win: Dynamo 9–0 Illichivets (Round 15)
- Biggest away win: Volyn 0–4 Vorskla (Round 1); Illichivets 1–5 Dnipro (Round 3); Illichivets 2–6 Vorskla (Round 17); Metalurh Zap. 0–4 Illichivets (Round 20); Metalurh Don. 1–5 Arsenal (Round 27)
- Highest scoring: Dynamo 9–0 Illichivets (Round 15)
- Longest winning run: 11 – Shakhtar (Round 10–20)
- Longest unbeaten run: 11 – Shakhtar (Round 10–20)
- Longest losing run: 7 – Metalurh Zap. (Round 6–12)
- Highest attendance: 50,390 Shakhtar – Dynamo (Round 12)
- Lowest attendance: 500 Zorya – Obolon (Round 22)
- Average attendance: 9228

The 2010–11 Ukrainian Premier League season was the 20th since its establishment and third since its reorganization. Shakhtar Donetsk were the defending champions, having won their 5th league title. A total of sixteen teams participated in the competition, fourteen of them contested the 2009–10 season while the remaining two were promoted from the Ukrainian First League.

The competition began on 9 July 2010 with four games. After the 19th Round, the competition was suspended for the winter break and resumed on 3 March 2011.

On 6 May 2011, Shakhtar Donetsk retained the championship with a 2–0 derby victory over rivals Metalurh Donetsk.

The top five teams were exactly the same as the previous season.

== Teams ==
=== Promoted ===
- FC Sevastopol, champion of the 2009-10 Ukrainian First League – (debut)
- FC Volyn Lutsk, runner-up of the 2009-10 Ukrainian First League – (returning after absence of 4 seasons)

=== Location map ===
Locations of team home grounds in Ukrainian Premier League 2010–11
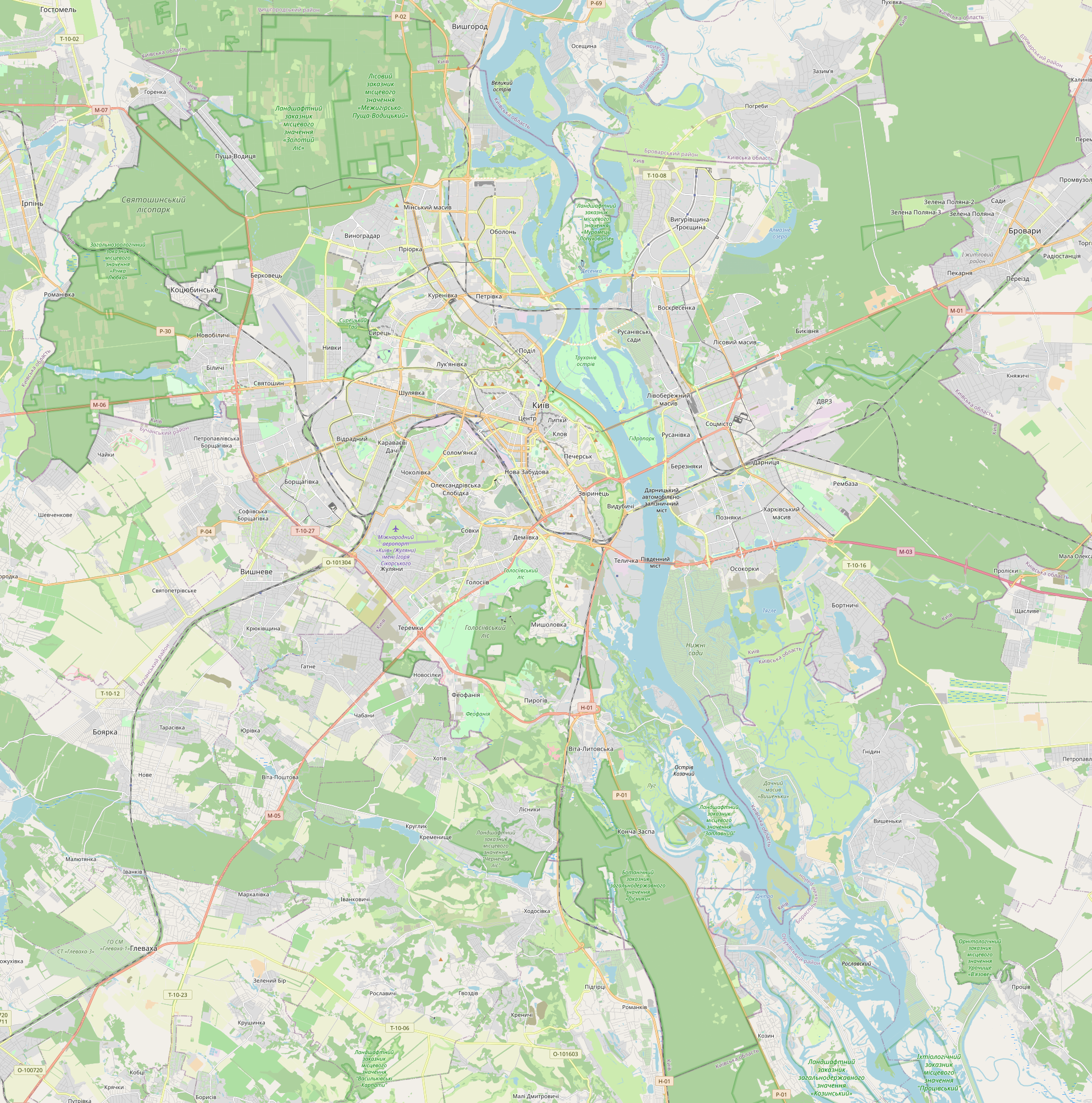
Kyiv city home venues of teams in the League

== Managers and captains ==
Club	Coach	Captain	Replaced coach(es)
Arsenal Kyiv	(Ukraine) Yuriy Bakalov	(Ukraine) Vitaliy Reva	
Dnipro Dnipropetrovsk	(Spain) Juande Ramos	(Ukraine) Andriy Rusol	(Ukraine) Vadym Tyschenko (interim) (Ukraine) Volodymyr Bezsonov
Dynamo Kyiv	(Russia) Yuri Semin	(Ukraine) Oleksandr Shovkovskyi	(Ukraine) Oleh Luzhnyi (interim) (Russia) Valery Gazzayev
Illichivets Mariupol	(Ukraine) Valeriy Yaremchenko	(Ukraine) Adrian Pukanych	(Ukraine) Ilya Bliznyuk (Ukraine) Oleksandr Volkov (interim)
Karpaty Lviv	(Russia) Oleg Kononov	(Ukraine) Andriy Tlumak	
Kryvbas Kryvyi Rih	(Ukraine) Yuriy Maksymov	(Ukraine) Oleksandr Maksymov	
Metalist Kharkiv	(Ukraine) Myron Markevych	(Ukraine) Oleksandr Horyainov	
Metalurh Donetsk	(Ukraine) Volodymyr Pyatenko (interim)	(Ukraine) Vyacheslav Checher	(Bulgaria) Nikolay Kostov (Ukraine) Volodymyr Pyatenko (interim) (Russia) Andrei Gordeyev
Metalurh Zaporizhzhia	(Ukraine) Hryhoriy Nehiryev (interim)	(Brazil) Junior Godoi	(Ukraine) Roman Hryhorchuk (Ukraine) Oleh Lutkov
Obolon Kyiv	(Ukraine) Serhiy Kovalets	(Ukraine) Valentyn Slyusar	
FC Sevastopol	(Bulgaria) Angel Chervenkov	(Ukraine) Serhiy Ferenchak	(Ukraine) Oleh Leschynskyi (Ukraine) Serhiy Shevchenko (Ukraine) Oleh Leschynskyi (interim)
Shakhtar Donetsk	(Romania) Mircea Lucescu	(Croatia) Darijo Srna	
Tavriya Simferopol	(Ukraine) Oleksandr Shudryk (interim)	(Serbia) Slobodan Marković	(Ukraine) Serhiy Puchkov (Ukraine) Valeriy Petrov (interim)
Volyn Lutsk	(Ukraine) Vitaliy Kvartsyanyi	(Ukraine) Oleksandr Pyschur	
Vorskla Poltava	(Ukraine) Mykola Pavlov	(Ukraine) Serhiy Dolhansky	
Zorya Luhansk	(Ukraine) Anatoly Chantsev	(Ukraine) Volodymyr Yezerskiy	

=== Managerial changes ===
Team	Outgoing head coach	Manner of departure	Date of vacancy	Table	Incoming head coach	Date of appointment	Table
Metalurh Zaporizhzhia	(Ukraine) Roman Hryhorchuk	End of contract	May 10	pre-season	(Ukraine) Oleh Lutkov	May 27	
FC Sevastopol	(Ukraine) Oleh Leschynskyi	Dismissed	June 19	pre-season	(Ukraine) Serhiy Shevchenko	June 19	pre-season
FC Sevastopol	(Ukraine) Serhiy Shevchenko	Dismissed	September 12	15th place	(Ukraine) Oleh Leschynskyi (interim)	September 12	15th place
Dnipro Dnipropetrovsk	(Ukraine) Volodymyr Bezsonov	Resigned	September 18	3rd place	(Ukraine) Vadym Tyschenko (interim)	September 18	3rd place
Tavriya Simferopol	(Ukraine) Serhiy Puchkov	Dismissed	September 22	12th place	(Ukraine) Valeriy Petrov (interim)	September 22	12th place
Dynamo Kyiv	(Russia) Valeriy Gazzayev	Resigns	October 1	2nd place	(Ukraine) Oleh Luzhnyi (interim)	October 1	2nd place
Dnipro Dnipropetrovsk	(Ukraine) Vadym Tyschenko (interim)	Interim position	October 1	3rd place	(Spain) Juande Ramos	October 1	3rd place
Illichivets Mariupol	(Ukraine) Ilya Bliznyuk	Resigned	November 1	15th place	(Ukraine) Oleksandr Volkov (interim)	November 1	15th place
Metalurh Donetsk	(Bulgaria) Nikolay Kostov	Resigned	November 12	10th place	(Ukraine) Volodymyr Pyatenko (interim)	November 12	10th place
Illichivets Mariupol	(Ukraine) Oleksandr Volkov (interim)	End as interim	November 26	14th place	(Ukraine) Valeriy Yaremchenko	November 26	14th place
FC Sevastopol	(Ukraine) Oleh Leschynskyi (interim)	End as interim	December 21	15th place	(Bulgaria) Angel Chervenkov	December 21	15th place
Dynamo Kyiv	(Ukraine) Oleh Luzhnyi (interim)	End as interim	December 24	2nd place	(Russia) Yuri Semin	December 24	2nd place
Metalurh Donetsk	(Ukraine) Volodymyr Pyatenko (interim)	End as interim	January 12	10th place	(Russia) Andrei Gordeyev	January 12	10th place
Metalurh Donetsk	(Russia) Andrei Gordeyev	Sacked	May 3	11th place	(Ukraine) Volodymyr Pyatenko (interim)	May 3	11th place
Metalurh Zaporizhzhia	(Ukraine) Oleh Lutkov	Sacked	May 4	16th place	(Ukraine) Hryhoriy Nehiryev (interim)	May 4	16th place
Tavriya Simferopol	(Ukraine) Valeriy Petrov (interim)	Sacked	May 8	10th place	(Ukraine) Oleksandr Shudryk (interim)	May 8	10th place

== Stadiums ==
Rank	Stadium	Club	Capacity	Highest Attendance		Notes
1	Donbas Arena	Shakhtar Donetsk	52,518	50,390	Round 12 (Dynamo)	
2	OSK Metalist	Metalist Kharkiv	41,411	38,600	Round 3 (Dynamo)	
3	Dnipro Arena	Dnipro Dnipropetrovsk	31,003	31,003	Round 15 (Shakhtar); Round 22 (Dynamo)	
4	Metalurh Stadium	Kryvbas Kryvyi Rih	29,783	10,000	Round 8 (Dynamo)	
5	Ukraina Stadium	Karpaty Lviv	28,051	27,500	Round 28 (Dynamo)	
6	RSK Olimpiyskiy	Metalurh Donetsk	25,831	6,000	Round 20 (Dynamo)	Used as home ground in Round 20 and 21
6	RSK Olimpiyskiy	Zorya Luhansk	25,831	650	Round 26 (Metalurh Donetsk)	Used as home ground in Round 26
7	Vorskla Stadium	Vorskla Poltava	25,000	15,000	Round 6 (Dynamo)	
8	Avanhard Stadium	Zorya Luhansk	22,320	19,000	Round 18 (Shakhtar)	
9	Lokomotiv Stadium	Tavriya Simferopol	19,978	16,300	Round 25 (Shakhtar)	
9	Lokomotiv Stadium	PFC Sevastopol	19,978	12,000	Round 4 (Dynamo)	Used by Sevastopol as home ground for the season
10	Lobanovsky Dynamo Stadium	Dynamo Kyiv	16,873	15,000	Round 27 (Shakhtar)	
10	Lobanovsky Dynamo Stadium	Arsenal Kyiv	16,873	4,200	Round 26 (Dynamo)	PL moved the Kyiv Derby game to Dynamo Stadium to accommodate a much larger crowd
11	Illichivets Stadium	Illichivets Mariupol	12,680	8,500	Round 21 (Zorya)	
12	Avanhard Stadium	Volyn Lutsk	12,080	11,520	Round 7 (Shakhtar)	
13	Slavutych-Arena	Metalurh Zaporizhzhia	11,983	8,500	Round 2 (Shakhtar)	
14	Dynamo Stadium (Kharkiv)	Metalist Kharkiv	9,000	6,516	Round 27 (Karpaty)	Used as home ground in Round 27 and Round 29 as the main stadium had the turf and drainage system replaced.
15	Stal Stadium, Alchevsk	Zorya Luhansk	8,632	4,500	Round 28 (Dnipro)	Used as home ground in Round 28
16	Metalurh Stadium	Metalurh Donetsk	5,300	5,000	Round 13 (Shakhtar)	
17	Obolon Stadium	Obolon Kyiv	5,100	5,100	Round 1 (Dynamo)	
18	Bannikov Stadium	Arsenal Kyiv	1,678	1,480	Round 30 (Kryvbas)	Lent from FFU for home games in first half of season

=== Attendance ===
The total attendance for the season was 2,214,833. The most watched team was Shakhtar Donetsk with 722,231 spectators. The least watched team was Arsenal Kyiv with 153,339 spectators.

== Qualification to European competitions for 2011–12 ==
- Since Ukraine finished in seventh place of the UEFA country ranking after the 2009–10 season, the league will have the same number of qualifiers for 2011–12 UEFA Europa League. The Ukrainian Cup winner qualifies for the play-off round.

=== Qualified teams ===
- After the 22nd Round, Shakhtar Donetsk qualified for European football for the 2011–12 season.
- After the 25th Round, both Dynamo Kyiv and Metalist Kharkiv qualified for European football for the 2011–12 season.
- After the 26th Round, Shakhtar Donetsk qualified for 2011–12 UEFA Champions League.
- After the 26th Round, both Dnipro Dnipropetrovsk and Karpaty Lviv qualified for European football for the 2011–12 season.
- After the 27th Round, Karpaty Lviv qualified for 2011–12 UEFA Europa League.
- After the 28th Round, Shakhtar Donetsk qualified for 2011–12 UEFA Champions League Group stage (C) and Dynamo Kyiv qualified for 2011–12 UEFA Champions League Third qualifying round.
- After the 28th Round, both Dnipro Dnipropetrovsk and Metalist Kharkiv qualified for 2011–12 UEFA Europa League.
- After the results of the semi-finals of the Ukrainian Cup, Metalist Kharkiv enters the 2011–12 UEFA Europa League in the Play-off round.
- After the 29th Round, Dnipro Dnipropetrovsk enters the 2011–12 UEFA Europa League in the Play-off round and Karpaty Lviv enters in the Third qualifying round.
- After the 30th Round, Vorskla Poltava qualified for the 2011–12 UEFA Europa League and enters Second qualifying round.

== League table ==
Pos	Team	Pld	W	D	L	GF	GA	GD	Pts	Qualification or relegation
1	Shakhtar Donetsk (C)	30	23	3	4	53	16	+37	72	Qualification to Champions League group stage
2	Dynamo Kyiv	30	20	5	5	60	24	+36	65	Qualification to Champions League third qualifying round
3	Metalist Kharkiv	30	18	6	6	58	26	+32	60	Qualification to Europa League play-off round
4	Dnipro Dnipropetrovsk	30	16	9	5	46	20	+26	57	Qualification to Europa League play-off round
5	Karpaty Lviv	30	13	9	8	41	34	+7	48	Qualification to Europa League third qualifying round
6	Vorskla Poltava	30	10	9	11	37	32	+5	39	Qualification to Europa League second qualifying round (Note: Since the 2011 Ukrainian Cup Final was between 2 teams that had already qualified for the 2011–12 UEFA Champions League (Shakhtar Donetsk and Dynamo Kyiv) the 6th placed team (Vorskla Poltava) qualified for the 2011–12 UEFA Europa League.)
7	Tavriya Simferopol	30	10	9	11	44	46	−2	39	
8	Metalurh Donetsk	30	11	5	14	36	45	−9	38	
9	Arsenal Kyiv	30	10	7	13	36	38	−2	37	
10	Obolon Kyiv	30	9	7	14	26	38	−12	34	
11	Volyn Lutsk	30	9	7	14	27	49	−22	34	
12	Zorya Luhansk	30	7	9	14	28	40	−12	30	
13	Kryvbas Kryvyi Rih	30	6	11	13	27	45	−18	29	
14	Illichivets Mariupol	30	7	8	15	45	67	−22	29	
15	Sevastopol (R)	30	7	6	17	26	48	−22	27	Relegation to Ukrainian First League
16	Metalurh Zaporizhzhia (R)	30	6	6	18	18	40	−22	24	Relegation to Ukrainian First League

Source: uafootball.net.ua
Rules for classification: 1st points; 2nd goal difference; 3rd goals scored; 4th fair play
(C) Champions; (R) Relegated

== Results ==
Home \ Away	ARK	DNI	DYN	ILL	KAR	KRY	MET	MDO	MZA	OBO	SEV	SHA	TAV	VOL	VOR	ZOR
Arsenal Kyiv	—	1–2	0–3	3–1	2–2	1–0	0–1	3–1	1–0	1–0	0–1	1–3	3–1	1–1	0–1	1–1
Dnipro	1–0	—	1–0	2–0	1–0	1–1	0–1	1–2	3–0	3–0	2–2	0–1	2–2	2–0	2–0	1–1
Dynamo Kyiv	3–2	0–0	—	9–0 (Note: Highest victory score in Ukrainian Premier League history (October 31, 2010) surpassing the record established by Shakhtar Donetsk against FC Torpedo Zaporizhzhia (9–1) on May 16, 1997.)	1–0	3–0	1–1	1–0	2–0	0–2	2–0	3–0	2–1	5–1	2–0	2–0
Illichivets Mariupol	2–2	1–5	3–2	—	2–3	1–1	1–4	1–1	0–0	1–0	4–2	1–3	5–1	2–2	2–6	2–2
Karpaty Lviv	2–1	0–0	1–2	3–1	—	2–1	0–1	2–1	1–0	3–0	2–1	1–0	1–0	1–0	2–2	4–2
Kryvbas Kryvyi Rih	1–1	0–3	0–1	1–0	0–0	—	0–0	1–0	0–0	2–2	3–1	0–2	1–4	2–4	1–0	0–2
Metalist Kharkiv	2–1	2–2	1–2	3–0	1–1	3–4	—	3–1	3–0	2–1	4–0	1–2	2–3	3–1	2–3	3–0
Metalurh Donetsk	1–5	3–2	0–2	0–3	4–1	2–2	0–3	—	0–1	3–0	1–0	0–2	2–1	0–2	2–0	1–1
Metalurh Zaporizhzhia	2–1	0–3	1–1	0–4	0–0	1–2	0–2	1–2	—	1–2	1–0	1–1	2–2	0–1	2–0	1–0
Obolon Kyiv	1–1	0–1	2–2	2–0	1–1	1–1	0–2	1–1	1–0	—	2–2	1–0	2–1	0–1	0–1	1–0
Sevastopol	0–2	2–1	0–3	1–0	3–1	2–2	0–0	0–1	1–0	3–1	—	0–1	0–1	4–1	0–0	0–1
Shakhtar Donetsk	4–0	0–0	2–0	1–0	1–0	2–0	2–1	2–0	2–1	0–1	5–0	—	4–1	4–0	1–0	1–0
Tavriya Simferopol	0–1	0–1	1–1	2–2	3–1	2–1	0–1	2–1	2–0	3–1	2–1	1–2	—	0–0	2–2	0–0
Volyn Lutsk	0–0	1–1	1–2	3–1	0–3	0–0	1–4	1–3	1–0	1–0	1–0	0–1	2–2	—	0–4	0–1
Vorskla Poltava	0–1	0–2	3–1	1–3	1–1	3–0	0–0	1–1	2–1	0–1	4–0	1–1	0–0	0–1	—	1–0
Zorya Luhansk	0–2	0–1	1–2	2–2	2–2	1–0	0–2	0–2	0–2	1–0	0–0	1–3	5–3	3–0	1–1	—

Source: uafootball.net.ua
Legend: Blue = home team win; Yellow = draw; Red = away team win.

== Round by round ==
Team ╲ Round	1	2	3	4	5	6	7	8	9	10	11	12	13	14	15	16	17	18	19	20	21	22	23	24	25	26	27	28	29	30
Shakhtar Donetsk	2	5	2	3	2	1	1	1	1	1	1	1	1	1	1	1	1	1	1	1	1	1	1	1	1	1	1	1	1	1
Dynamo Kyiv	7	6	3	2	3	4	3	2	2	2	2	2	2	2	2	2	2	2	2	2	2	2	2	2	2	2	2	2	2	2
Metalist Kharkiv	3	7	8	5	6	5	7	6	5	5	5	4	3	3	3	3	3	3	3	3	3	3	3	3	3	3	3	3	3	3
Dnipro	4	1	1	1	1	2	2	3	3	4	3	3	4	4	4	4	4	4	4	4	4	4	4	4	4	4	4	4	4	4
Karpaty Lviv	13	11	9	7	5	6	5	5	4	3	4	5	6	5	5	5	5	5	5	5	5	5	5	5	5	5	5	5	5	5
Vorskla Poltava	1	8	4	4	4	3	4	4	6	7	7	6	7	7	7	9	6	8	8	8	11	12	10	11	7	9	6	6	6	6
Tavriya Simferopol	12	15	11	11	13	7	6	9	10	12	11	11	10	10	8	6	7	9	9	9	7	8	7	6	6	7	10	10	7	7
Metalurh Donetsk	8	3	7	10	12	8	8	7	7	6	6	7	8	8	9	11	11	10	10	12	10	11	8	9	11	8	11	11	8	8
Arsenal Kyiv	5	2	5	6	7	9	10	8	8	8	8	8	5	6	6	7	8	6	7	7	8	6	6	7	8	10	7	7	9	9
Obolon Kyiv	6	14	15	16	16	13	11	12	9	11	12	14	14	13	13	12	12	11	11	10	9	10	12	8	9	11	8	8	10	10
Volyn Lutsk	16	16	16	13	14	14	14	15	13	10	10	10	11	12	10	8	9	7	6	6	6	7	9	10	10	6	9	9	11	11
Zorya Luhansk	11	13	14	14	9	10	13	10	12	13	14	13	13	11	12	10	10	12	12	11	12	9	11	12	12	12	12	13	12	12
Kryvbas Kryvyi Rih	15	12	12	8	8	12	9	11	11	9	9	9	9	9	11	13	13	13	13	14	14	14	14	13	13	14	13	12	13	13
Illichivets Mariupol	9	4	10	12	10	11	12	13	14	15	13	12	12	14	15	14	14	14	14	13	13	13	13	14	14	15	15	15	15	14
Sevastopol	10	9	6	9	11	15	15	14	15	14	15	15	15	15	14	15	15	15	15	15	15	15	15	15	15	13	14	14	14	15
Metalurh Zaporizhzhia	14	10	13	15	15	16	16	16	16	16	16	16	16	16	16	16	16	16	16	16	16	16	16	16	16	16	16	16	16	16

Source: Dynamo Kyiv's Official Site (in Ukrainian)

== Top goalscorers ==
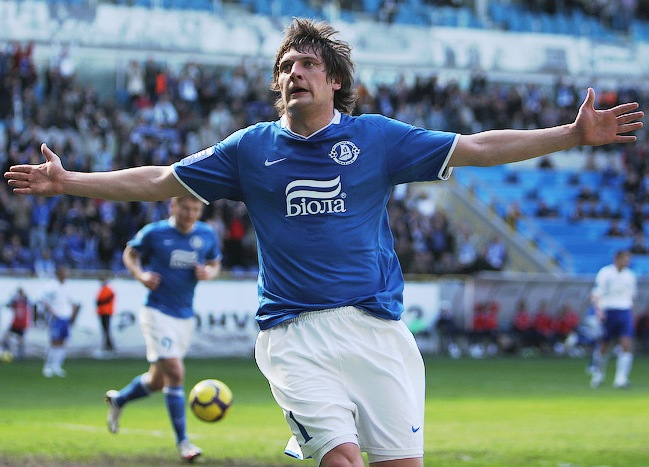
Seleznyov in 2010

The top ten goalscorers during the season.

#	Scorer	Goals (Pen.)	Team
1	(Ukraine) Yevhen Seleznyov	17	Dnipro Dnipropetrovsk
2	(Ukraine) Marko Dević	14 (3)	Metalist Kharkiv
3	(Nigeria) Lucky Idahor	13 (1)	Tavriya Simferopol
4	(Ukraine) Denys Oliynyk	12	Metalist Kharkiv
5	(Ukraine) Andriy Yarmolenko	11	Dynamo Kyiv
6	(Ukraine) Oleksiy Antonov	10	Illichivets Mariupol
6	(Ukraine) Vasyl Sachko	10	Vorskla Poltava
6	(Brazil) Luiz Adriano	10 (1)	Shakhtar Donetsk
6	(Ukraine) Andriy Shevchenko	10 (2)	Dynamo Kyiv
6	(Ukraine) Konstantyn Yaroshenko	10 (2)	Illichivets Mariupol

== Awards ==
Award	Founder	Laureate
Ukrainian Footballer of the Year	newspaper Ukrainian Football	Andriy Voronin
Footballer of the Premier-Liha	newspaper Komanda	Andriy Yarmolenko
Event of the Season	ua-football.com	Shakhtar Donetsk in quarter-finals of Champions League
Discovery of the Season	ua-football.com	José Sosa
Top Young Footballer	ua-football.com	Roman Bezus
Team of the Season	ua-football.com	Metalist Kharkiv
Top Ukrainian Footballer	ua-football.com	Oleh Husyev
Top Legionnaire	ua-football.com	Willian
Top Coach	ua-football.com	Myron Markevych

=== Season awards ===
The laureates of the 2010–11 UPL season were:

- Best player: (Brazil) Willian (Shakhtar Donetsk)
- Best coach: (Romania) Mircea Lucescu (Shakhtar Donetsk)
- Best goalkeeper: (Ukraine) Oleksandr Shovkovskyi (Dynamo Kyiv)
- Best arbiter: (Ukraine) Viktor Shvetsov (Odesa)
- Best young player: (Ukraine) Yevhen Konoplyanka (Dnipro Dnipropetrovsk)
- Best goalscorer: (Ukraine) Yevhen Seleznyov (Dnipro Dnipropetrovsk)

== See also ==
- 2010–11 Ukrainian First League
- 2010–11 Ukrainian Premier League Reserves
- 2010–11 Ukrainian Second League
- 2010–11 Ukrainian Cup
- 2010–11 UEFA Europa League

Transfers

- Transfer window regulations for the Ukrainian championship is unclear
- List of Ukrainian football transfers summer 2010
- List of Ukrainian football transfers winter 2010–2011
