= Artem Kultyshev =

Ukrainian footballer (born 1984)

Personal information
- Full name: Artem Serhiyovych Kultyshev
- Date of birth: 28 March 1984 (age 42)
- Place of birth: Dnipropetrovsk, Ukrainian SSR
- Height: 1.75 m (5 ft 9 in)
- Position: Midfielder

Youth career
- 1998–2001: Dnipro Dnipropetrovsk

Senior career*
| Years | Team | Apps | (Gls) |
| 2001 | Orion Dnipropetrovsk | 9 | (0) |
| 2002–2003 | Uholyok Dymytrov | 19 | (0) |
| 2004–2005 | Krystal Kherson | 33 | (3) |
| 2005–2013 | Sevastopol | 146 | (9) |
| 2011 | → Belshina Bobruisk (loan) | 15 | (1) |
| 2013–2014 | Tytan Armyansk | 40 | (2) |
| 2014 | Myr Hornostayivka | 6 | (0) |
| 2015–2016 | SKChF Sevastopol | 25 | (4) |
| 2017–2018 | Yevpatoria | 43 | (1) |
| 2018–2019 | TSK Simferopol | 29 | (0) |
| 2020–2021 | PFC Yalta | | |
- * Club domestic league appearances and goals as of 31 December 2019

Artem Kultyshev (Ukrainian: Артем Сергійович Култишев; born 28 March 1984) is a Ukrainian former professional football midfielder.
