= Nelkin =

Nelkin is a surname. Notable people with the surname include:

- Dorothy Nelkin (1933–2003), American sociologist of science
- Stacey Nelkin, American film and television actress

== See also ==
- Nelin, another surname
