= Andriy Kiva =

Russian footballer

Personal information
- Full name: Andriy Ihorovych Kiva
- Date of birth: 21 November 1989 (age 36)
- Place of birth: Sevastopol, Ukrainian SSR, Soviet Union
- Height: 1.71 m (5 ft 7 in)
- Position: Midfielder

Team information
- Current team: FC Chernomorets Sevastopol

Youth career
- 2004–2005: UFK Kharkiv
- 2005–2006: Metalist Kharkiv

Senior career*
Years	Team	Apps	(Gls)
2006	FC Lokomotyv Dvorichna	3	(0)
2006	FC Hazovyk-KhGV Kharkiv	10	(0)
2008	PFC Sevastopol-2	5	(0)
2007–2014	PFC Sevastopol	92	(13)
2015–2016	FC SKChF Sevastopol		
2016	FC Neftekhimik Nizhnekamsk	13	(3)
2018	FC KAMAZ Naberezhnye Chelny	6	(2)
2018	FC Sokol Saratov	6	(1)
2019–2023	FC Sevastopol		
2023–	FC Chernomorets Sevastopol		
- * Club domestic league appearances and goals as of 30 August 2018

Andriy Ihorovych Kiva (Ukrainian: Андрій Ігорович Ківа); Andrei Igorevich Kiva (Russian: Андрей Игоревич Кива; born 21 November 1989) is a Ukrainian (until 2014), Russian football midfielder. He plays for FC Chernomorets Sevastopol.

== Career ==
In 2014, after the annexation of Sevastopol, Crimea to Russia, he became a Russian citizen.

In February 2015, he became a player of the FC Sevastopol, which performs in the Republican Football Federation of Crimea.

He played in the Russian Football National League for FC Neftekhimik Nizhnekamsk in 2016.
