= Valeriy Chaly =

Valeriy Chaly may refer to:

- Valeriy Chaly (diplomat) (born 1970), Ukrainian diplomat
- Valeriy Chaly (footballer) (born 1958), Ukrainian-Russian football coach and former player
