= Oleksandr Zhabokrytskyi =

Ukrainian footballer

Oleksandr Zhabokrytskyy
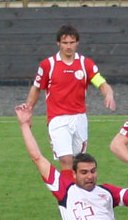

Personal information
- Full name: Oleksandr Serhiyovych Zhabokrytskyy
- Date of birth: 29 January 1981 (age 45)
- Place of birth: Uman, Cherkasy Oblast, Ukrainian SSR
- Height: 1.74 m (5 ft 8 1/2 in)
- Position: Midfielder

Team information
- Current team: PFC Yalta (manager)

Senior career*
Years	Team	Apps	(Gls)
1997–1998	FC ChAES-Slavutych	2	(0)
2001–2002	FC Sudnobudivnyk Sevastopol		
2002–2014	PFC Sevastopol	276	(40)
2014–2019	FC SKChF Sevastopol		
2019	FC Aluston-YUBK Alushta		
2019–2020	FC Rubin Yalta		
2020–2021	PFC Yalta		

Managerial career
- 2020–: PFC Yalta
- * Club domestic league appearances and goals

Oleksandr Zhabokrytskyy (Ukrainian: Олександр Сергійович Жабокрицький); Aleksandr Zhabokritsky (Russian: Александр Сергеевич Жабокрицкий); (born 29 January 1981) is a Ukrainian football coach and a former midfielder who is the manager of PFC Yalta.

In 1999 he was called up for military service and served at the Ukrainian frigate Hetman Sahaidachny.
