= Lev Potapov =

Russian footballer

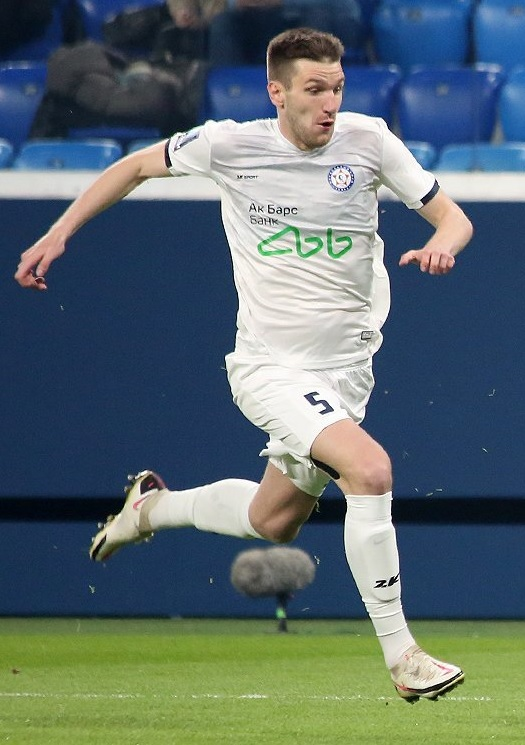
- Potapov with KAMAZ Naberezhnye Chelny in 2022

Personal information
- Full name: Lev Grigoryevich Potapov
- Date of birth: 28 October 1992 (age 34)
- Place of birth: Yoshkar-Ola, Russia
- Height: 1.89 m (6 ft 2 1/2 in)
- Position: Defender

Team information
- Current team: FC Sevastopol
- Number: 37

Youth career
- –2012: FC Spartak Yoshkar-Ola

Senior career*
Years	Team	Apps	(Gls)
2012–2014	FC Spartak Yoshkar-Ola	54	(2)
2014–2016	FC Zenit-Izhevsk	38	(1)
2017	FC Volga Ulyanovsk	6	(0)
2017–2021	FC Neftekhimik Nizhnekamsk	111	(6)
2022	FC KAMAZ Naberezhnye Chelny	8	(0)
2022	FC Znamya Truda Orekhovo-Zuyevo	12	(1)
2023	FC Dynamo Vologda	12	(1)
2023–	FC Sevastopol	109	(12)
- * Club domestic league appearances and goals as of 31 October 2026

Lev Grigoryevich Potapov (Russian: Лев Григорьевич Потапов; born 28 October 1992) is a Russian professional football defender who plays for FC Sevastopol.

== Club career ==
He made his debut in the Russian Second Division for FC Spartak Yoshkar-Ola on 21 July 2012 in a game against FC KAMAZ Naberezhnye Chelny.

He made his Russian Football National League debut for FC Neftekhimik Nizhnekamsk on 7 July 2019 in a game against FC Mordovia Saransk.
