= Sevastopol Sports Complex =

Football stadium in Sevastopol, Crimea

Coordinates: 44.60268°N 33.54198°E

SKS-Arena
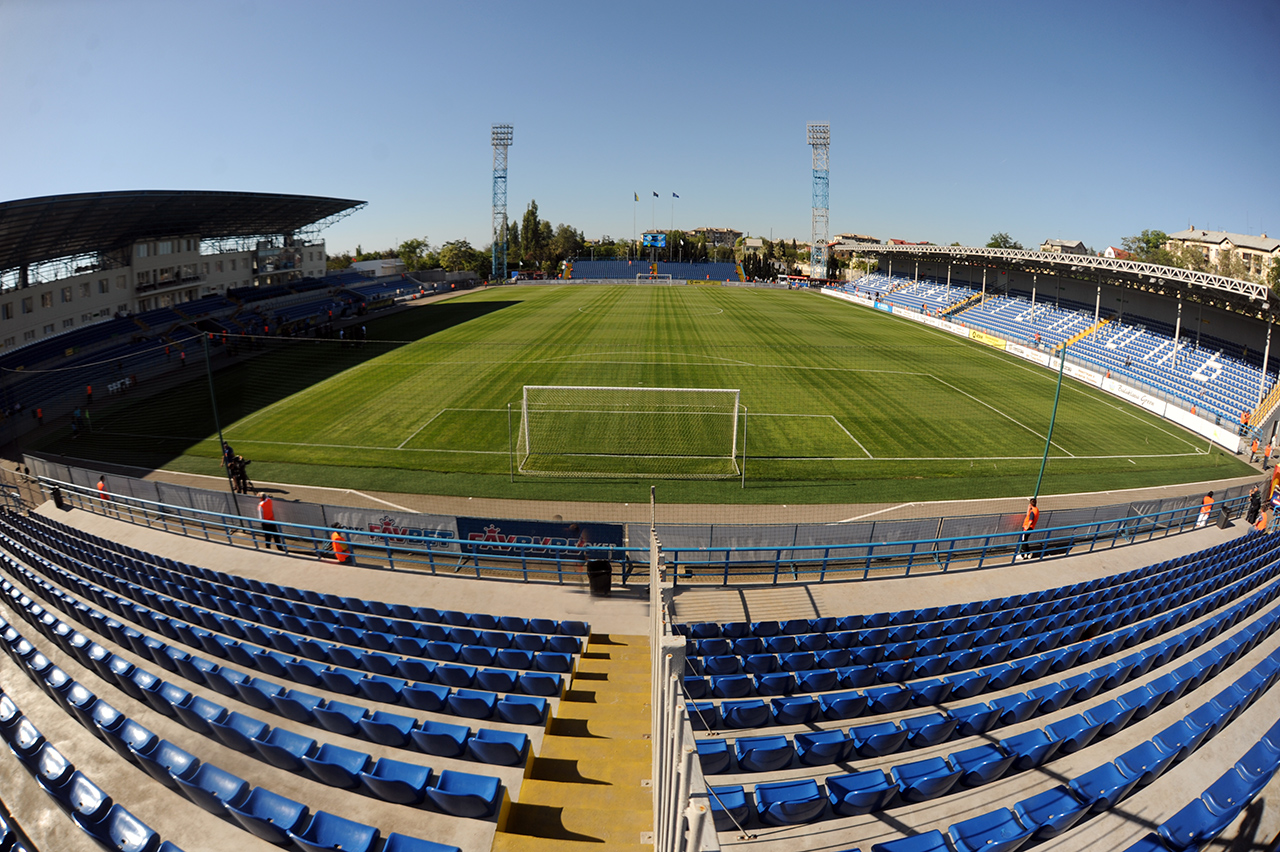
- Interactive map of SKS-Arena
- Location: Sevastopol, Crimea
- Capacity: 5,864
- Surface: Grass

Construction
- Opened: 1985

Tenants
- FC Sevastopol; FC Sevastopol (2014) (currently)

Sevastopol Sports Complex is a football stadium in Sevastopol, located in the Crimea. It is currently used for football matches, and was the home of FC Sevastopol in the Ukrainian Premier League. The stadium's capacity is 5,864.
