= Vladyslav Hevlych =

Ukrainian footballer

Personal information
- Full name: Vladyslav Dmytrovych Hevlych
- Date of birth: 23 September 1994 (age 32)
- Place of birth: Sevastopol, Ukraine
- Height: 1.77 m (5 ft 10 in)
- Position: Midfielder

Team information
- Current team: Sevastopol
- Number: 11

Youth career
- 2002–2011: Youth Sport School #5 Sevastopol

Senior career*
Years	Team	Apps	(Gls)
2011–2014	Sevastopol	3	(0)
2011–2013	→ Sevastopol-2	53	(5)
2014–2016	SKChF Sevastopol	22	(2)
2016	Ternopil	8	(0)
2016	SKChF Sevastopol	5	(0)
2017–2018	Dnepr Mogilev	38	(2)
2018–2020	Sevastopol	27	(1)
2020	Kaluga	5	(0)
2020	Lada Dimitrovgrad	6	(0)
2021–2023	Sevastopol	52	(7)
2024–	Sevastopol	88	(6)
- * Club domestic league appearances and goals as of 31 October 2026

Vladyslav Hevlych (Ukrainian: Владислав Дмитрович Гевлич); Vladislav Gevlich (Russian: Владислав Дмитриевич Гевлич; born 23 September 1994) is a Ukrainian-born Russian professional football midfielder who plays for Sevastopol.

== Career ==
Hevlych is a product of the Youth Sport School Sevastopol system. His first trainer was Viktor Tkachenko. After playing for all FC Sevastopol team levels, he signed a contract with this club.

After the annexation of Crimea to Russia, he received Russian citizenship as Vladislav Gevlich.
