= Hennadiy Altman =

Ukrainian footballer and manager

Hennadiy Altman Геннадій Семенович Альтман
Personal information
- Full name: Hennadiy Semenovych Altman
- Date of birth: 22 May 1979 (age 47)
- Place of birth: Odesa, Soviet Union
- Height: 1.91 m (6 ft 3 in)
- Position: Goalkeeper

Youth career
- 1997–1998: Chornomorets Odesa

Senior career*
Years	Team	Apps	(Gls)
1998–1999	Dynamo Odesa	0	(0)
1999	Zimbru Chișinău	0	(0)
2000–2002	Metalurh Donetsk	3	(0)
2000	→ Mashynobudivnyk Druzhkivka (loan)	24	(0)
2001–2002	→ Metalurh-2 Donetsk	25	(0)
2002	Khimki	0	(0)
2003–2007	Chornomorets Odesa	33	(0)
2003–2004	→ Chornomorets-2 Odesa	17	(0)
2007	Illichivets Mariupol	0	(0)
2008	Oleksandriya	7	(0)

Managerial career
- 2011–2012: SC Tavriya Simferopol (assistant)
- 2019: Atletyk Odesa (youth coach)
- 2019: Moldova (assistant)
- * Club domestic league appearances and goals as of 31 May 2008

Hennadiy Semenovych Altman (Ukrainian: Геннадій Семенович Альтман; born 22 May 1979) is a Ukrainian retired football goalkeeper and current manager.

== Biography ==
Hennadiy got his start in football at the FC Chornomorets Odesa youth school. He is the son of the Ukrainian coach Semen Altman, who is a former goalkeeper himself. Altman's professional career has been closely linked to his father's coaching career. He has moved to many clubs that were coached by his father. Over the years Hennadiy has played for FC Zimbru Chișinău, FC Mashinobudivnyk Druzhkivka, Metalurh Donetsk, FC Khimki, FC Chornomorets Odesa, FC Illychivets Mariupol, and PFC Olexandria. So far his longest playing stint has been with his home town team Chornomorets, which lasted 5 years. With Chornomorets Gennady he won the bronze medals in the 2005–06 season.

In 2002 Altman, along with his father moved to FC Chornomorets Odesa and was battling for the starting position with Vitaliy Rudenko. At the start of 2007, Altman left Ukraine to sign with Israeli club, Hakoah Maccabi Amidar/Ramat Gan where he would not count as a foreigner since he is Jewish. Media outlets reported that Altman left Ukraine due to some anti-semitic behavior of the football supporters in Ukraine. Altman played one Toto Cup match for Hakoah before being released. In the summer of 2007, along with his father, he moved to FC Illychivets Mariupol. After his father's unexpected firing in 2007 he was transferred to another Ukrainian First League club, PFC Olexandria.
