= Nelin =

Nelin is a surname. Notable people with the surname include:

- Andriy Nelin (born 1991), Ukrainian football player
- Dion Nelin (born 1976), Danish carom billiards player
- Jesper Nelin (born 1992), Swedish biathlete
