= Serhiy Diyev =

Russian-Ukrainian footballer and manager

Personal information
- Full name: Serhiy Valerianovych Diyev
- Date of birth: 21 April 1958 (age 68)
- Place of birth: Poltava, Ukrainian SSR
- Position: Midfielder

Senior career*
Years	Team	Apps	(Gls)
1976–1977	FC Kolos Poltava	57	(2)
1978	SKA Kiev	7	(0)
1978	FC Dnipro Cherkasy	9	(0)
1979	FC Kolos Poltava	40	(1)
1980	FC Dnipro Dnipropetrovsk	18	(1)
1980	FC Kolos Poltava	20	(2)
1981–1983	FC Kryvbas Kryvyi Rih	123	(18)
1984	FC Vorskla Poltava		
1985–1989	FC Chaika Sevastopol	230	(24)
1992	FC More Feodosia	1	(0)
1993–1995	FC Yavir Krasnopilya	92	(10)
1996–1999	FC Chornomorets Sevastopol	33	(1)

Managerial career
- 2000: FC Chornomorets Sevastopol (caretaker)
- 2009: FC Sevastopol (caretaker)
- 2009–2010: FC Sevastopol-2
- 2010: FC Sevastopol (assistant)
- 2014–2015: FC SKChF Sevastopol
- * Club domestic league appearances and goals

Serhiy Valerianovych Diyev (Ukrainian: Сергій Валеріанович Дієв; Russian: Сергей Валерианович Диев; born 21 April 1958) is a Ukrainian and Russian football manager and a former player who currently manages FC SKChF Sevastopol.
