= Yuriy Martynyuk =

Ukrainian footballer and manager

Personal information
- Full name: Yuriy Anatoliyovych Martynyuk
- Date of birth: 9 October 1974 (age 52)
- Place of birth: Kharkiv, Ukrainian SSR
- Position: Forward

Youth career
- Sports school 11 Kharkiv

Senior career*
Years	Team	Apps	(Gls)
1994–1995	VlaSKo Kharkiv	17	(7)
1995–1997	FC Constructorul Chisinau	30	(15)
1997–1999	FC Enerhetyk Komsomolske	24	(10)
1999–2001	FC Arsenal Kharkiv	64	(15)
2002–2004	FC Stal Dniprodzerzhynsk	81	(28)
2005–2006	FC Hazovyk Kharkiv	34	(14)
2006	FC Lokomotyv Dvorichna	4	(1)
2008	FC Energetik-2 Ekibastuz	10	(1)
2011	FC Elektrotyazhmash Kharkiv	7	(2)
2015	FC Start Chuhuiv	20	(4)

Managerial career
- Metalist academy Kharkiv (assistant)
- 2007–2008: FC Stal Dniprodzerzhynsk (assistant)
- 2008: FC Stal Dniprodzerzhynsk
- * Club domestic league appearances and goals

Yuriy Martynyuk (Ukrainian: Юрій Анатолійович Мартинюк, born 9 October 1974 in Kharkiv) is a former Ukrainian footballer and football manager.
