= Vadym Rodina =

Ukrainian footballer

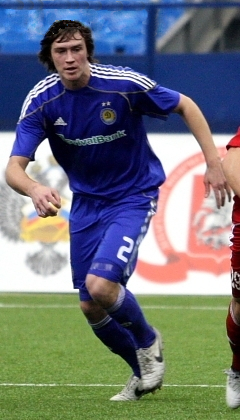

Personal information
- Full name: Vadym Vasylyovych Rodina
- Date of birth: 24 March 1988 (age 38)
- Place of birth: Kiev, Ukrainian SSR, Soviet Union
- Height: 1.83 m (6 ft 0 in)
- Position: Centre back

Youth career
- 2001–2005: Dynamo Kyiv

Senior career*
Years	Team	Apps	(Gls)
2005–2010	FC Dynamo Kyiv	0	(0)
2005–2008	FC Dynamo-3 Kyiv	57	(1)
2007–2010	FC Dynamo-2 Kyiv	61	(2)
2010–2011	FC Obolon Kyiv	0	(0)
2012–2014	FC Zirka Kirovohrad	?	(?)

International career^{‡}
2007–2008	Ukraine-19	19	(0)
2009	Ukraine-21	5	(0)
- * Club domestic league appearances and goals as of 7 May 2013 ‡ National team caps and goals as of 4 March 2010

Vadym Rodina (Ukrainian: Вадим Васильович Родіна, born 24 March 1988) is a Ukrainian football defender who played for FC Zirka Kirovohrad in the Ukrainian First League.
