= Artur Siryk =

Ukrainian footballer

Personal information
- Full name: Artur Volodymyrovych Siryk
- Date of birth: 17 February 1989 (age 37)
- Place of birth: Potsdam, East Germany
- Height: 1.81 m (5 ft 11 1/2 in)
- Position: Forward

Youth career
- 2002–2003: Shakhtar Donetsk
- 2003–2004: UFK Dnipropetrovsk
- 2005–2006: UFK Kharkiv
- 2006: Metalist Kharkiv

Senior career*
Years	Team	Apps	(Gls)
2005–2009	Kharkiv	1	(0)
2005–2006	→ Kharkiv-2	20	(0)
2009–2010	Bodva Moldava nad Bodvou		
2010	Kharkiv	4	(1)
2010	Illichivets Mariupol	2	(0)
2011	Poltava	7	(3)
2011	Prykarpattya Ivano-Frankivsk	3	(0)
2012–2013	Poltava	41	(5)
2013	UkrAhroKom Holovkivka	8	(0)
2014	Banga Gargždai	13	(2)
2015	TSK Simferopol	8	(2)
2017–2018	Kafa Feodosia	6	(0)
- * Club domestic league appearances and goals

Artur Siryk (Ukrainian: Артур Володимирович Сірик; born 17 February 1989) is a Ukrainian former professional football striker.
