= Illya Hlushytskyi =

Ukrainian footballer

Personal information
- Full name: Illya Serhiyovych Hlushytskyi
- Date of birth: 2 August 1993 (age 33)
- Place of birth: Makiivka, Donetsk Oblast, Ukraine
- Height: 1.82 m (5 ft 11 1/2 in)
- Position: Defender

Team information
- Current team: FC Ocean Kerch
- Number: 14

Youth career
- 2006–2010: FC Shakhtar Donetsk

Senior career*
Years	Team	Apps	(Gls)
2010–2018	FC Shakhtar Donetsk	0	(0)
2010–2011	→ FC Shakhtar-3 Donetsk	26	(1)
2012	→ FC Olimpik Donetsk (loan)	11	(1)
2012–2013	→ FC Shakhtar-3 Donetsk	28	(4)
2014–2015	→ FC Hoverla Uzhhorod (loan)	10	(0)
2015	→ FC Hirnyk-Sport Komsomolsk (loan)	11	(2)
2016–2018	→ FC Helios Kharkiv (loan)	28	(1)
2018–	FC Ocean Kerch		

International career^{‡}
2009	Ukraine-16	9	(0)
2009–2010	Ukraine-17	12	(1)
2010–2011	Ukraine-18	7	(0)
- * Club domestic league appearances and goals as of 24 May 2017 ‡ National team caps and goals as of 24 May 2017

Illya Hlushytskyi (Ukrainian: Ілля Сергійович Глушицький; born 2 August 1993) is a Ukrainian football defender who plays for FC Ocean Kerch.

== Career ==
Hlushytskyi is a product of the FC Shakhtar Donetsk youth sportive school and signed a contract with FC Shakhtar Donetsk in the Ukrainian Premier League in 2010.

He played on loan for Ukrainian clubs in the Ukrainian Second League and in the Ukrainian First League and in July 2014 went on loan for FC Hoverla in the Ukrainian Premier League.
