= Redvan Osmanov =

Russian footballer

Personal information
- Full name: Redvan Ibragimovich Osmanov
- Date of birth: 5 May 1993 (age 33)
- Place of birth: Urozhayne, Simferopol Raion, Crimea, Ukraine
- Height: 1.87 m (6 ft 2 in)
- Position: Forward

Team information
- Current team: FC Sevastopol
- Number: 8

Youth career
- –2010: UOR Simferopol
- 2010–2011: FC Spartak Molodizhne
- 2011: UOR Krasnolissya

Senior career*
| Years | Team | Apps | (Gls) |
| 2011 | FC Yednist' Plysky | 14 | (1) |
| 2012 | FC Nyva Ternopil | 19 | (3) |
| 2013 | FC Krymteplytsia Molodizhne | 10 | (1) |
| 2013–2014 | FC Dynamo Khmelnytskyi | 7 | (0) |
| 2014 | KVUOR Krasnolissya | | |
| 2015 | FC TSK-Tavria Simferopol | 7 | (0) |
| 2015–2016 | FC Bakhchysarai | 23 | (13) |
| 2016–2020 | FC Sevastopol | 83 | (47) |
| 2020–2021 | FC KAMAZ Naberezhnye Chelny | 41 | (7) |
| 2022 | FC Sevastopol | | |
| 2022–2023 | FC Mashuk-KMV Pyatigorsk | 21 | (3) |
| 2023–2023 | FC TSK-Tavria Simferopol | 12 | (14) |
| 2023– | FC Sevastopol | 90 | (36) |
- * Club domestic league appearances and goals as of 31 October 2026

Redvan Ibragimovich Osmanov (Russian: Редван Ибрагимович Османов; Ukrainian: Редван Ібрагімович Османов; born 5 May 1993) is a Russian professional football player who plays for FC Sevastopol. He was born and raised in Crimea, Ukraine and acquired Russian citizenship after the annexation of Crimea.

== Club career ==
He made his debut in the Russian Football National League for FC KAMAZ Naberezhnye Chelny on 10 July 2021 in a game against FC Alania Vladikavkaz. From 13 July 2023 he has played for FC Sevastopol, where he serves as one of the team captains.
