= Urozhaine =

Urozhaine (Ukrainian: Урожайне, lit. 'of the harvest') is a Ukrainian place name that can refer to:

- Urozhaine, Simferopol Raion, Autonomous Republic of Crimea
- Urozhaine, Sovietskyi Raion, Autonomous Republic of Crimea
- Urozhaine, Chernihiv Oblast
- Urozhaine, Dnipropetrovsk Oblast
- Urozhaine, Donetsk Oblast
- Urozhaine, Kherson Oblast
- Urozhaine, Kirovohrad Oblast (abandoned sometime after 2001)
- Urozhaine, Luhansk Oblast
- Urozhaine, Ternopil Oblast
- Urozhaine, Vinnytsia Oblast
- Urozhaine, Zaporizhzhia Oblast
