= Oleh Zhenyukh =

Ukrainian footballer

Personal information
- Full name: Oleh Vasylyovych Zhenyukh
- Date of birth: 22 March 1987 (age 39)
- Place of birth: Lviv, Ukrainian SSR, Soviet Union
- Height: 1.87 m (6 ft 1 1/2 in)
- Position: Midfielder

Youth career
- 2001–2004: Karpaty Lviv

Senior career*
Years	Team	Apps	(Gls)
2004–2009	Karpaty Lviv	24	(0)
2004	→ Halychyna-Karpaty Lviv	2	(0)
2004–2006	→ Karpaty-2 Lviv	30	(2)
2010–2011	FC Volyn Lutsk	5	(0)
- * Club domestic league appearances and goals

Oleh Zhenyukh (Ukrainian: Олег Васильович Женюх; born 22 March 1987) is a Ukrainian former professional football midfielder who plays for FC Volyn Lutsk in the Ukrainian Premier League.
