= Vitaliy Rudenko =

Ukrainian footballer (born 1981)

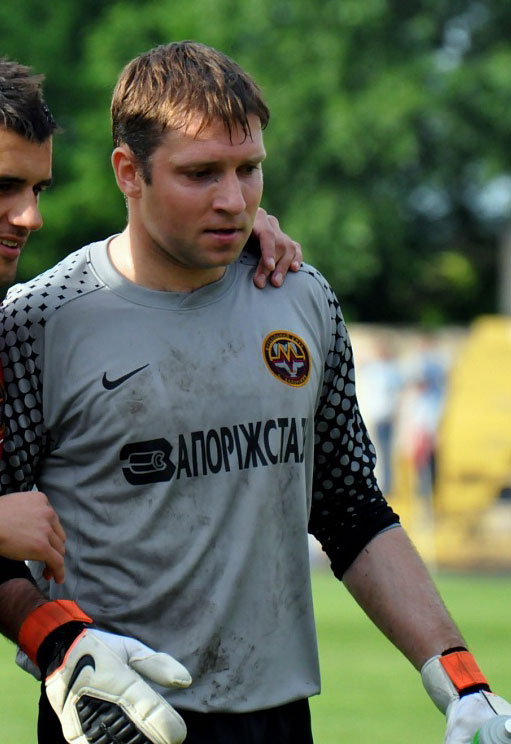

Personal information
- Full name: Vitaliy Mykolayovych Rudenko
- Date of birth: 26 January 1981 (age 45)
- Place of birth: Odesa, Ukrainian SSR, Soviet Union
- Height: 2.00 m (6 ft 7 in)
- Position: Goalkeeper

Youth career
- 1996–97: Liliya-Fakel Odesa

Senior career*
Years	Team	Apps	(Gls)
1997–1998	SC Odesa	31	(0)
1999–2010	Chornomorets Odesa	187	(0)
1999–2002	→ Chornomorets-2 Odesa	11	(0)
2010–2011	Karpaty Lviv	7	(0)
2011	→ Metalurh Zaporizhzhia (loan)	3	(0)
2011–2013	Metalurh Zaporizhzhia	41	(0)

International career
2004	Ukraine U19	?	(?)
2005	Ukraine U20	24	(3)
2006	Ukraine U21	28	(3)
Medal record
Men's football
Representing Ukraine
UEFA European Under-18 Championship
Runner-up	2000 Germany
- * Club domestic league appearances and goals

Vitaliy Mykolayovych Rudenko (Ukrainian: Віталій Миколайович Руденко, born 26 January 1981) is a Ukrainian former professional footballer who played as a goalkeeper.

== Career ==
Rudenko is a product of the Chornomorets Odesa youth system. Having spent a few years playing in lower divisions, in 1999 he was brought in to the senior team of Chornomorets as cover for Hennadiy Altman. The following season he was battling for the starting position and becoming first choice keeper for Chornomorets in the 2001–02 season. He has since solidified his position as the number one keeper with a series of consistent seasons for the club.

Following the relegation of Chornomorets from the Ukrainian Premier League at the end of the 2009–10 season, Rudenko joined Karpaty Lviv. Having limited opportunities behind the first-choice Karpaty goalkeeper and captain Andriy Tlumak, Rudenko went on loan to Metalurh Zaporizhzhia during the 2010–11 winter break.

Rudenko has represented Ukraine at all levels but senior. In 2000, he was part of the team that won the silver medal at the European Under-18 Football Championship.

== See also ==
- 2001 FIFA World Youth Championship squads#Ukraine
