= Oleksandr Varvanin =

Ukrainian footballer

Personal information
- Full name: Oleksandr Oleksandrovych Varvanin
- Date of birth: 1 May 1997 (age 29)
- Place of birth: Horlivka, Ukraine
- Height: 1.75 m (5 ft 9 in)
- Position: Defender

Youth career
- 2007–2010: Shakhtar Donetsk
- 2010–2014: Olimpik Donetsk

Senior career*
Years	Team	Apps	(Gls)
2014–2016	Olimpik Donetsk	0	(0)
2016	Ankar Kharkiv	10	(1)
2017	Krumkachy Minsk	9	(1)
2018	Yenakiieve		
2019–2020	Krasnougol Krasnodon		
2021	Orsha	11	(0)
2021	Arsenal Dzerzhinsk	7	(0)
- * Club domestic league appearances and goals as of 31 December 2021

Oleksandr Varvanin (Ukrainian: Олександр Олександрович Варванін; born 1 May 1997) is a Ukrainian former football defender.

== Career ==
Varvanin is a product of the FC Olimpik Donetsk youth sports school system. From 2014 he played in the Ukrainian Premier League Reserves, but never made his debut for the main squad team in the Ukrainian Premier League. In January 2017, Varvanin signed a three-year contract with FC Krumkachy, of the Belarusian Premier League.

After one season at Krumkachy, Varvanin left the team. Between 2018 and 2020 he played in Donetsk and Luhansk-based amateur leagues.
