= Artem Yevlyanov =

Ukrainian footballer

Personal information
- Date of birth: 18 June 1984 (age 42)
- Place of birth: Donetsk, Soviet Union
- Height: 1.83 m (6 ft 0 in)
- Position: Midfielder

Youth career
- 1998–2000: Shakhtar Donetsk
- 2000: Dnipro Dnipropetrovsk

Senior career*
Years	Team	Apps	(Gls)
2000–2001	Dnipro Dnipropetrovsk	0	(0)
2001	→ Dnipro-3 Dnipropetrovsk	16	(1)
2001	→ Dnipro-2 Dnipropetrovsk	2	(0)
2002–2003	Metalurh Donetsk	0	(0)
2002–2003	→ Metalurh-2 Donetsk	43	(4)
2004–2005	Banants	32	(3)
2005	Zakarpattia Uzhhorod	2	(0)
2005–2010	Zemplín Michalovce		
2010	Tatran Prešov	1	(0)
2011–2012	Tytan Armiansk	22	(2)
2013	Olimpik Donetsk	0	(0)
2014	Avanhard Kramatorsk	1	(0)
2015–2020	Pobeda Donetsk (DNR league)		
- * Club domestic league appearances and goals

Artem Yevlyanov (Ukrainian: Артем Євланов; born 18 June 1986) is a Ukrainian former football player.

== Career ==
He played for Slovak club Zemplín Michalovce. In his debut for Michalovce he scored a goal in the league match against Slovan Duslo Šaľa. In the 2005–06 season he was Michalovce's top scorer.
