= Valeriy Chaly (footballer) =

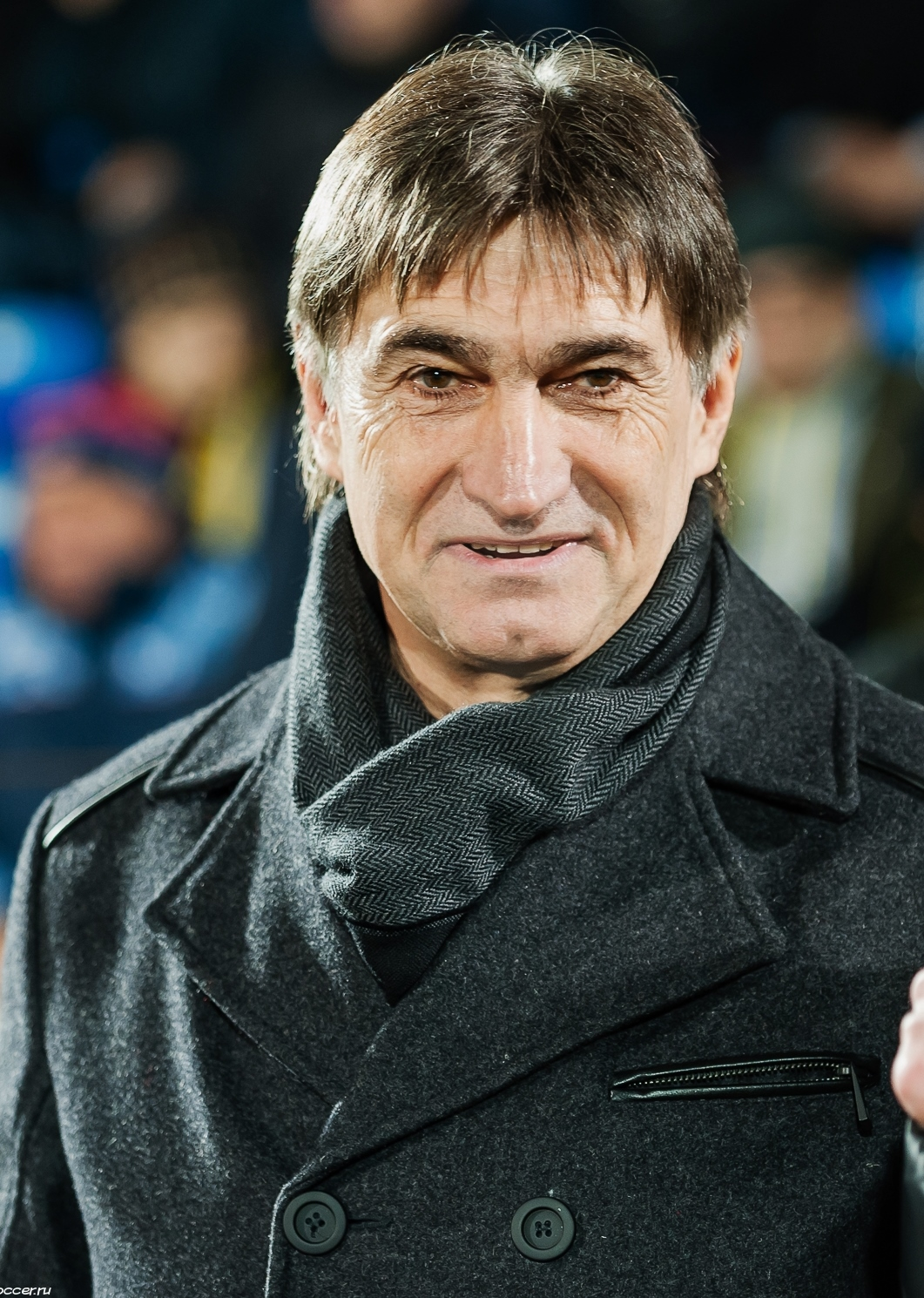
- Chaly with Rubin Kazan in 2015

Personal information
- Full name: Valeriy Oleksandrovych Chaly
- Date of birth: 13 March 1958 (age 68)
- Place of birth: Sevastopol, Ukrainian SSR; Soviet Union
- Height: 1.80 m (5 ft 11 in)
- Positions: Defender; midfielder

Team information
- Current team: FC Sevastopol (general director)

Youth career
- FC Atlantyka Sevastopol

Senior career*
Years	Team	Apps	(Gls)
1976–1977	FC Atlantyka Sevastopol	25	(0)
1978	FC Dynamo Kirov	28	(0)
1979	FC Atlantyka Sevastopol	0	(0)
1979–1980	SKA Odesa	0	(0)
1981–1982	FC Atlantyka Sevastopol	87	(6)
1983–1984	SC Tavriya Simferopol	40	(2)
1985–1989	FC Chayka Sevastopol	199	(14)

Managerial career
- 2009–2010: FC Sevastopol-2 (assistant)
- 2010: FC Sevastopol (assistant)
- 2011–2012: FC Iskra-Stal
- 2012–2013: FC Sevastopol-2
- 2014–2015: FC Rubin Kazan (assistant)
- 2015–2016: FC Rubin Kazan
- 2017–: FC Sevastopol (general director)
- * Club domestic league appearances and goals

Valeriy Oleksandrovych Chaly (Ukrainian: Валерій Олександрович Чалий, romanized: Valerii Oleksandrovych Chalyi; Russian: Валерий Александрович Чалый, romanized: Valeri Aleksandrovich Chaly; born 13 March 1958) is a Ukrainian and Russian football manager and a former player. He also holds Russian citizenship. He is the general director of FC Sevastopol. He was the manager of FC Rubin Kazan.
