= Serhiy Puchkov =

Ukrainian footballer (born 1962)

Serhiy Puchkov Сергій Пучков
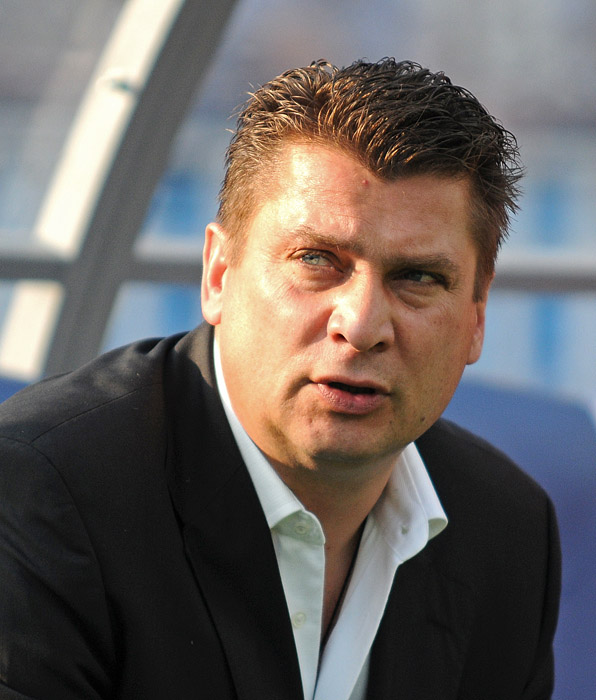

Personal information
- Full name: Serhiy Valentynovych Puchkov
- Date of birth: 17 April 1962 (age 64)
- Place of birth: Lutuhyne, Luhansk Oblast, Ukrainian SSR
- Height: 1.80 m (5 ft 11 in)
- Position: Defender

Senior career*
Years	Team	Apps	(Gls)
1979–1980	Torpedo Lutsk		
1981–1982	SKA Odesa	58	(1)
1983–1989	Dnipro Dnipropetrovsk	153	(4)
1990	Chornomorets Odesa	20	(1)
1991	Metalurh Zaporizhzhia	29	(4)
1991–1993	Stahl Brandenburg	13	(0)
1993	Bornim	?	(4)
1994	KAMAZ Naberezhnye Chelny	2	(0)
1994	Hapoel Be'er Sheva		
1994	FC Blaho Blahoyeve	4	(0)
1995	Evis Mykolaiv	30	(4)
1996	Metalurh Mariupol	21	(0)
1997	Evis Mykolaiv	14	(3)
1997	Araz	10	(1)
2002–2003	Hirnyk-Sport Komsomolsk	12	(0)
2003	Dnipro Cherkasy	1	(0)

International career
	USSR-21	13	(1)

Managerial career
- 1997: Mykolaiv
- 2003–2004: Cherkasy
- 2004–2005: Krystal Kherson
- 2005–2008: Sevastopol
- 2008–2010: Tavriya Simferopol
- 2011–2012: Sevastopol
- 2013: Slavutych Cherkasy
- 2013: Metalurh Zaporizhzhia
- 2014: Gandzasar Kapan
- 2016–2018: Hirnyk-Sport Horishni Plavni
- 2021: Tavriya Simferopol
- * Club domestic league appearances and goals

Serhiy Valentynovych Puchkov (Ukrainian: Сергій Валентинович Пучков; born 17 April 1962) is a Ukrainian former football player and manager who played as a midfielder.

== Career ==
Puchkov is a former head-coach of Metalurh Zaporizhzhia in the Ukrainian Premier League.

He is married and has two sons and a daughter.

== Honours ==
=== Player ===
- Soviet Top League Champion: 1988
- USSR Cup: 1989

=== Coach ===
- Ukrainian Cup: Ukrainian Cup 2009–10
