= Stanislav Hudzikevych =

Ukrainian footballer

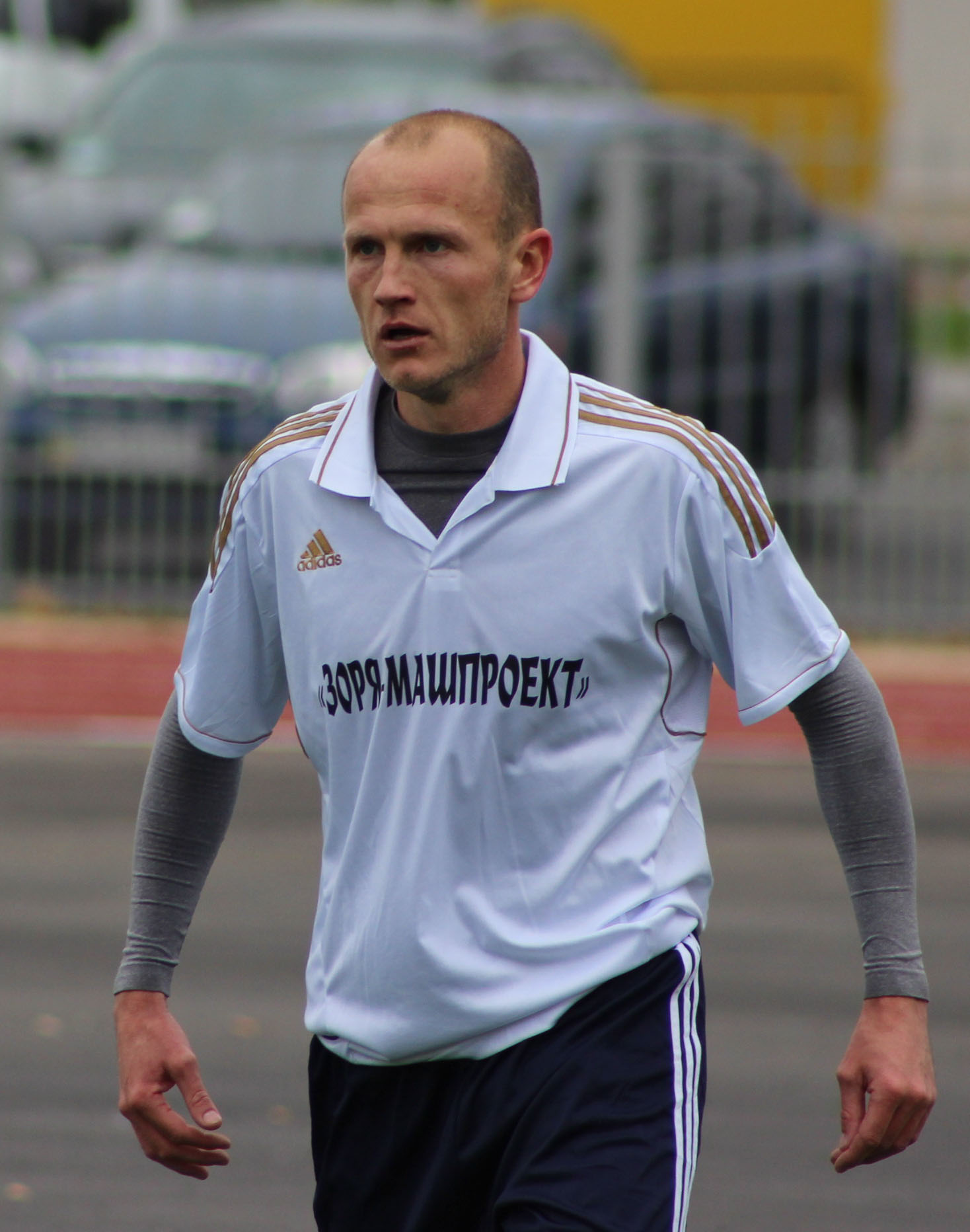

Personal information
- Full name: Stanislav Oleksandrovych Hudzikevych
- Date of birth: 7 March 1978 (age 48)
- Place of birth: Mohyliv-Podilskyi, Ukrainian SSR, Soviet Union
- Height: 1.73 m (5 ft 8 in)
- Position: Midfielder

Team information
- Current team: Sevastopol (manager)

Senior career*
Years	Team	Apps	(Gls)
1996–1998	Nistru Otaci	4	(1)
1998–1999	FC Kirovets Mohyliv-Podilskyi	13	(3)
2000	Batyr	10	(0)
2000	Zhetysu	12	(0)
2001	FC Yevropa Pryluky	17	(3)
2002	Dynamo Brest	13	(0)
2003–2005	PFC Sevastopol	63	(9)
2005	Obolon Kyiv	8	(0)
2005	→ Obolon-2 Kyiv	5	(1)
2006–2009	PFC Sevastopol	104	(22)
2010	Illichivets Mariupol	1	(0)
2010–2011	Arsenal Bila Tserkva	24	(4)
2011–2013	Mykolaiv	50	(4)
2013–2014	Torpedo Mykolaiv	5	(0)
2014	Gvardeyets Gvardeyskoye		
2014	SKChF-2 Sevastopol		
2015	SKChF Sevastopol		
2016–2017	Gvardeyets Gvardeyskoye		
2017	Artek Yalta		

Managerial career
- 2018: Sevastopol (assistant)
- 2018–2020: Sevastopol
- 2020–2021: Kyzyltash Bakhchisaray
- 2022–: Sevastopol
- * Club domestic league appearances and goals

Stanislav Hudzikevych (Ukrainian: Станіслав Олександрович Гудзікевич); Stanislav Gudzikevich (Russian: Станисла́в Алекса́ндрович Гудзике́вич; born 7 March 1978), is a Ukrainian (until 2014) and Russian football coach and a former midfielder. He is the manager of Sevastopol.

== Personal life ==
In 2014, after the annexation of the Crimea to Russia, he received a Russian citizenship as Stanislav Gudzikevich.
