= Andriy Komarytskyi =

Ukrainian footballer

Personal information
- Full name: Andriy Andriyovych Komarytskyi
- Date of birth: 2 February 1982 (age 44)
- Place of birth: Voroshylovhrad, Ukrainian SSR
- Height: 1.85 m (6 ft 1 in)
- Position: Goalkeeper

Youth career
- 1998–1999: LVUFK Luhansk

Senior career*
Years	Team	Apps	(Gls)
2000–2006	Stal Alchevsk	92	(0)
2000–2002	Stal-2 Alchevsk	53	(0)
2007–2009	Zorya Luhansk	45	(0)
2010–2011	Arsenal Kyiv	0	(0)
2011–2014	Stal Alchevsk	53	(0)
- * Club domestic league appearances and goals

Andriy Komarytskyi (Ukrainian: Андрій Андрійович Комарицький; born 2 February 1982) is a professional footballer.

== Career ==
He is the starting goalkeeper for Stal and has been playing there since 1999. In 2004 it was recorded that he wanted to advance to the Ukrainian Premier League with Stal, which happened the following year.
