= Junior Godoi =

Brazilian footballer

Júnior Godoi
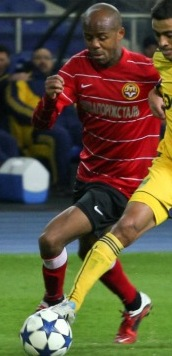

Personal information
- Full name: Luiz Antônio de Godoy Alves Júnior
- Date of birth: 20 September 1978 (age 48)
- Place of birth: São Paulo, Brazil
- Height: 1.84 m (6 ft 0 in)
- Position: Midfielder

Senior career*
Years	Team	Apps	(Gls)
- São Paulo
2003	União Barbarense		
2003–2006	Tavriya Simferopol	70	(11)
2006–2007	Legia Warsaw	13	(1)
2008–2009	Zorya Luhansk	14	(4)
2010	Vila Nova		
2010–2013	Metalurh Zaporizhia	85	(11)
2015	Primavera		
- * Club domestic league appearances and goals

Luiz Antônio de Godoy Alves Júnior, better known as Júnior Godoi (born 20 September 1978), is a Brazilian former professional footballer who played as a midfielder or striker.

He last played for Metalurh Zaporizhia. He joined Legia Warsaw from Tavriya Simferopol. His Brazilian clubs were São Paulo and União Barbarense. Junior scored a goal in the game versus Austria Wien in the first round of the 2006–07 UEFA Cup. After being absent from football for six months due to a serious left knee injury, Godoi returned to play again in the Ukrainian Premier League, joining Zorya Luhansk on 8 September 2008.

== Career ==
Godoi started playing football in Brazil at the age of 13. He then played for the nursery school "Palmeiras". There is also information that he played for São Paulo. At age 19, he signed a professional contract with Palmeiras. Then, he defended the colors of União Barbarense.

In early 2004, Godoi moved to Tavriya Simferopol in Ukraine, playing with compatriot Edmar. He made his Ukrainian Premier League debut on 14 March 2004 in a goalless draw against Dynamo Kyiv. On 6 November 2005, in a match against Volyn Lutsk (1–2), Godoi scored a goal and thus became the author of Tavriya's 500th goal in the championships of Ukraine. Godoi left Tavriya because of disagreements with the coach Mikhail Fomenko.

In late August 2006, he moved on a free transfer to Legia Warsaw in Poland by signing a four-year contract. He made his first appearance for the club on 8 September 2006 in a 1–1 drawwith Arka Gdynia. On 14 September 2006, he scored in the 44th minute of a 1–1 UEFA Cup draw against Austria Wien. In his period in Warsaw he suffered a knee injury, the recovery took 7 months. In the 2006–07 season, Godoi made 13 league appearances and scored once, as Legia finished third.

In September 2008, he moved back to Ukraine and signed a contract with Zorya Luhansk. He made his debut on 20 September 2008 in a match against FC Kharkiv (2–3), scoring a goal in the 27th minute. In the 2008–09 season, Godoi had become a major player in the team, playing 14 games and scoring 4 goals. In the summer of 2009, he left the club and began to train youth players in Brazil. In January 2010, he received the status of free agent.

After playing for Brazilian club Vila Nova from the city of Goiânia in Brazilian Serie B (20 matches and 1 goal), he moved to Ukraine again and signed a contract with Zaporozhian Metallurg Zaporizhya in September 2010. He debuted on 26 September 2010 in an away match against Vorskla Poltava (2–1), Godoi started the match. In October 2010, together with the team won the Yevhen Kucherevskyi Cup by beating the FC Dnipro Dnipropetrovsk 2–3. On 21 November 2010, in a goalless draw against Karpaty Lviv, after a collision with goalkeeper Vitaliy Rudenko Godoi was seriously injured, was carried off the field on a stretcher and taken to the ambulance to the hospital. There, they straightened his shoulder under general anesthesia, after which he could not play for several months.

In Metalurh, Godoi became a major player and team leader, he was also the captain. Metalurh finished the 2010–11 season in last and were relegated to the Ukrainian First League. After one season in the Ukrainian First League, the club was promoted back to the Ukrainian Premier League.
