= Bohdan Mel'nychenko =

Ukrainian footballer

Personal information
- Full name: Bohdan Mel'nychenko
- Date of birth: 15 May 1989 (age 37)
- Place of birth: Ukraine
- Height: 1.86 m (6 ft 1 in)
- Position: Goalkeeper

Senior career*
Years	Team	Apps	(Gls)
2006–2008	FC Karpaty Lviv	0	(0)
2008–2008	→ FC Karpaty-2 Lviv	10	(0)
2009–2012	FC Arsenal Bila Tserkva	?	(0)
- * Club domestic league appearances and goals

Bohdan Mel'nychenko (born 15 May 1989) is a professional Ukrainian footballer.

== Career ==
He played for Ukrainian Premier League club FC Karpaty Lviv. He is the product of the Karpaty Lviv Youth School System.
