= Oleh Leshchynskyi =

Ukrainian footballer and manager (born 1965)

Oleh Leschynskyi
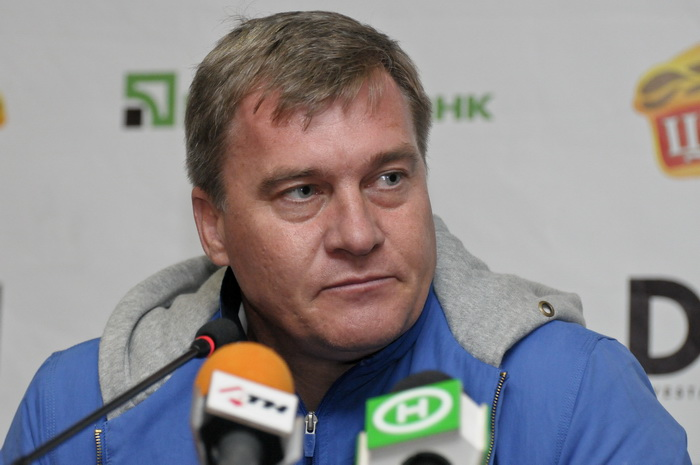

Personal information
- Full name: Oleh Stanislavovych Leschynskyi
- Date of birth: 31 December 1965 (age 60)
- Place of birth: Kiev, Ukrainian SSR, Soviet Union
- Position: Midfielder

Youth career
- 1973–1980: Dynamo Kyiv
- 1980–1982: Sportive Internate Kyiv

Senior career*
Years	Team	Apps	(Gls)
1983—1984	Desna Chernihiv	11	(1)
198?–198?	Avanhard Rivne		
198?–1990	Chayka Sevastopol		

Managerial career
- 2002–2008: Sevastopol (assistant)
- 2008–2010: Sevastopol
- 2010: Sevastopol (assistant)
- 2010: Sevastopol (interim)
- 2010–2012: Sevastopol (sports director)
- 2012–2013: Tytan Armyansk
- 2014: Tosno
- 2014: SKChF Sevastopol (youth)
- 2015–16: SKChF Sevastopol
- 2016: Guria Lanchkhuti
- 2017: Okean Kerch
- 2018: Dnepr Mogilev (assistant)
- * Club domestic league appearances and goals

Oleh Leschynskyi (Ukrainian: Олег Станіславович Лещинський); Oleg Leshchinsky (Russian: Олег Станиславович Лещинский); born 31 December 1965) is a former Soviet professional football midfielder and Ukrainian (until 2014) and Russian (since 2014) coach.

== Career ==
After a poor start to the 2012-13 Ukrainian First League season by Tytan Armyansk their coach Oleksandr Haydash was replaced by Leshchynskyi.

Since March to June 2014, Oleg Leshchinsky worked as a manager of Russian side FC Tosno.
