= Andriy Nelin =

Ukrainian footballer (born 1991)

Personal information
- Full name: Andriy Valeriyovych Nelin
- Date of birth: 17 July 1991 (age 35)
- Place of birth: Sumy, Ukraine
- Position: Defender

Team information
- Current team: Viktoriya Sumy
- Number: 7

Youth career
- –2005: Dynamo Kyiv
- 2005: Zmina Sumy
- 2005–2007: Arsenal Kyiv

Senior career*
Years	Team	Apps	(Gls)
2007–2008	Illichivets Mariupol	0	(0)
2007–2008	→ Illichivets-2 Mariupol (loan)	27	(1)
2008–2010	Dnipro Dnipropetrovsk	0	(0)
2011	Avanhard Kramatorsk	7	(1)
2012	Zhemchuzhyna Yalta	21	(0)
2013–2015	Hirnyk-Sport Komsomolsk	76	(0)
2016	FC Sambir		
2016–2021	Viktoriya Mykolaivka		
2021–	Viktoriya Sumy	34	(3)
- * Club domestic league appearances and goals as of 1 March 2024

Andriy Valeriyovych Nelin (born 17 July 1991) is a professional Ukrainian football defender playing for Viktoriya Sumy.
