= FC Sevastopol (2014) =

Sevastopol
- Full name: Futbolʹnyy klub Sevastopol
- Founded: 2014; 12 years ago
- Ground: Sevastopol Sports Complex
- Capacity: 5,864
- Chairman: Valeriy Chaly
- Manager: Stanislav Hudzikevych
- League: Russian Second League; Division A Silver Group
- 2026: Division B, Group 1, 1st (promoted)
- Website: fcsevastopol.ru
Home colours	Away colours

FC Sevastopol is a professional football club based in Sevastopol, Crimea.

== Team names ==
- 2014–2016: FC SKChF Sevastopol (Sportivny Klub Chernomorskogo Flota)
- 2016: FC Sevastopol
- 2016–: FC Sevastopol

== History ==
Old emblem

It was founded in 2014, following the Russian annexation of Crimea. Ukrainian Premier League club FC Sevastopol was liquidated and a new team was organized instead, registered according to the laws of Russia. It then was licensed to participate in the third-tier Russian Professional Football League in the 2014–15 season. As Ukraine considers Crimea Ukrainian territory, Football Federation of Ukraine lodged a complaint with UEFA about Crimean clubs' participation in Russian competitions. On 22 August 2014, it was decided "that any football matches played by Crimean clubs organized under the auspices of the Russian Football Union will not be recognized by UEFA until further notice".

On 4 December 2014, UEFA banned Crimean clubs from participating in Russian professional competitions, and announced that a new local Crimean Premier League will be set up in the future that UEFA will manage directly.

It has the same name as the historical team SKCF Sevastopol which participated in the Soviet Union football competitions. "SKChF" stands for "Sportivny Klub Chernomorskogo Flota" (Russian: Спортивный Клуб Черноморского Флота; "Sport Club of the Black Sea Fleet").

Ahead of the 2022–23 season the club has announced its intention to compete in the Russian Football National League 2. They were not admitted at the time.

Before the 2023–24 season, the club was admitted to the newly organized fourth-tier Russian Second League Division B and it played its first match in that league on 16 July 2023.

On 13 October 2026, Sevastopol secured the first place in their Russian Second League Division B group and promotion to the third-tier Second League Division A.

== Current squad ==
As of 11 September 2026 Note: Flags indicate national team as defined under FIFA eligibility rules; some limited exceptions apply. Players may hold more than one non-FIFA nationality.

No.	Pos.	Nation	Player
1	GK	RUS	Rostislav Tyshchenko
5	DF	RUS	Serafim Abzalilov
6	MF	RUS	Amet Dugu
7	MF	RUS	Vitaly Mironenko
8	FW	UKR	Redvan Osmanov
9	FW	UKR	Stanislav Ruban
10	FW	RUS	Dmitry Ivanov
11	DF	UKR	Vladyslav Hevlych
16	MF	RUS	Maksim Myasnikov
17	MF	RUS	Maksim Suprun
18	MF	RUS	Boris Bely
19	FW	RUS	Dmitry Pigulevsky
20	DF	RUS	Anatoly Volkov

No.	Pos.	Nation	Player
21	MF	RUS	Vadim Zubavlenko
22	GK	RUS	Rustem Klimanov
23	MF	RUS	Aleksandr Popov
25	DF	RUS	Zeki Aliyev
37	DF	RUS	Lev Potapov
40	DF	RUS	Khalid Shakhtiyev
44	DF	RUS	Leonid Zagrebelny
52	DF	RUS	Maksim Isayev
77	FW	RUS	Aleksandr Olenev
79	DF	RUS	Aleksei Grechkin
88	MF	RUS	Yury Maksimov
91	GK	RUS	Maksim Vertiyev
99	FW	RUS	Artyom Stepanovich

== Honours ==
- All-Crimean Championship

2015

- Crimean Premier League (1st tier)

2016–17, 2018–19, 2020–21
2015–16, 2017–18
2019–20

- CFU Cup (National Cup)

2018–19
2015–16, 2017–18

== Coaches ==
- 2014-15 Sergei Diyev
- 2015-16 Oleh Leshchynskyi
- 2016–present Stanislav Hudzikevych

== League and cup history ==
=== Russia ===
Season	Div.	Pos.	Pl.	W	D	L	GS	GA	P	Domestic Cup	Europe	Notes
2014–15	3rd "South Group 1" (Vtoraya Liga, Yug)	—_{/11}	17	3	5	9	10	23	14	1/32 finals		Annulled as SKChF Sevastopol

=== Crimea ===
Season	Div.	Pos.	Pl.	W	D	L	GS	GA	P	Domestic Cup	Europe	Notes
2015	1st All-Crimean Championship Gr. A	1_{/10}	9	9	0	0	52	6	27			Final (winner); reorganization of competitions
2015–16	1st Premier League	2_{/8}	28	15	9	4	53	23	54	Final		as SKChF Sevastopol
2016–17	1st Premier League	1_{/8}	28	18	4	6	65	37	58	1/4 finals		
2017–18	1st Premier League	2_{/8}	28	16	8	4	62	33	56	Final		
2018–19	1st Premier League	1_{/8}	28	15	7	6	54	32	52	Winner		
2019–20	1st Premier League	3_{/8}	28	14	5	9	60	44	47	1/2 finals		
2020–21	1st Premier League	1_{/8}	28	20	4	4	63	23	64	1/2 finals		
2021–22	1st Premier League											
