= FC Sevastopol =

Sevastopol
- Full name: Futbol′nyy klub Sevastopol
- Founded: 2002
- Dissolved: 2014
- Ground: Sevastopol Sports Complex
- Capacity: 5,644
- 2013–14: Ukrainian Premier League, 9th
Home colours	Away colours

FC Sevastopol (Ukrainian: ФК «Севастополь») was a Ukrainian football club based in Sevastopol. The club was a spiritual descendant of the Soviet clubs from Sevastopol such as Chaika Sevastopol. After the completion of the 2013–14 Ukrainian Premier League season due to the 2014 Crimean Conflict, the club ceased its existence and applied for a Russian license with the new name FC SKChF Sevastopol.

On 16 July 2023, after several seasons playing in the Crimean Premier League, this successor club, now named FC Sevastopol (2014), played its first match in the Russian Second League Division B, the fourth tier: the Ukrainian Association of Football asked UEFA and FIFA to consider excluding the Russian Football Union in response.

== History ==
The current club was founded in 2002 after another club from Sevastopol Chaika Sevastopol was relegated from professional ranks and dissolved. FC Sevastopol started out from the Ukrainian Second League and soon was promoted to the Ukrainian First League in 2007. In 2010–11 the club took part in the Premier League of Ukraine for the first time. The club was relegated in its first season back in the Ukrainian First League once more. But the club returned to the Ukrainian Premier League after one season there in which they won promotion to the Ukrainian Premier League. After the annexation of Crimea by Russia, FC Sevastopol asked permission from UEFA and FIFA to shift to the Russian league next season. The new club, FC SKChF Sevastopol, began playing in Russian competitions in August 2014.

The club's colours are all red (home) and all dark blue (away).

== Stadium ==
For the first half of the 2009–10 season the home ground of the club was located outside the Sevastopol city limits. FC Sevastopol played at the Druzhba Stadium located in Bakhchisaray, Crimea. After the winter break they returned to their home ground Sevastopol Sports Complex.

=== Football kits and sponsors ===
Years	Football kit	Shirt sponsor
2010–11	lotto/nike	Smart Holding
2013–14	Nike	Smart Holding

== Honors ==
- Ukrainian First League (tier-II)
  - Champions (2): 2009–10, 2012–13
- Ukrainian Second League (tier-III)
  - Champions (1): 2006–07 (Gr. B)

== League and cup history (Ukraine) ==
The team competed in Ukrainian competitions as FC Sevastopol.

Season	Div.	Pos.	Pl.	W	D	L	GS	GA	P	Domestic Cup	Europe	Notes
2002–03	3rd Second League Gr. B	9_{/16}	30	12	4	14	31	36	40	1/32 finals		
2003–04	3rd Second League Gr. B	10_{/16}	30	10	8	12	26	33	38	1/32 finals		
2004–05	3rd Second League Gr. B	13_{/14}	26	7	4	15	19	34	25	1/32 finals		
2005–06	3rd Second League Gr. B	3_{/15}	28	15	6	7	48	29	51	1/64 finals		
2006–07	3rd Second League Gr. B	1_{/16}	28	21	1	6	58	21	64	1/4 finals		Promoted
2007–08	2nd First League	15_{/20}	38	12	7	19	38	55	43	1/16 finals		
2008–09	2nd First League	4_{/18}	32	15	6	11	43	41	51	1/32 finals		
2009–10	2nd First League	1_{/18}	34	24	4	6	68	27	76	1/32 finals		Promoted
2010–11	1st Premier League	15_{/16}	30	7	6	17	26	48	27	1/4 finals		Relegated
2011–12	2nd First League	3_{/18}	34	23	7	4	60	22	76	1/16 finals		
2012–13	2nd First League	1_{/18}	34	22	8	4	71	22	74	1/2 finals		Promoted
2013–14	1st Premier League	9_{/16}	28	10	5	13	32	43	35	1/16 finals		Withdrew

== Coaches ==
- (Ukraine) Valeriy Petrov (July 2002 – 2005)
- (Ukraine) Serhiy Puchkov (1 July 2005 – Sept 29, 2008)
- (Ukraine) Oleh Leschynskyi (Sept 29, 2008–19 June 2010)
- (Ukraine) Serhiy Shevchenko (1 July 2010 – Sept 12, 2010)
- (Ukraine) Oleh Leschynskyi (interim) (Sept 12, 2010–2 Dec 2010)
- (Bulgaria) Angel Chervenkov (21 Dec 2010 – 14 June 2011)
- (Ukraine) Oleksandr Ryabokon (28 June 2011 – 17 Oct 2011)
- (Ukraine) Serhiy Puchkov (18 Oct 2011 – 13 June 2012)
- (Belarus) Aleh Konanaw (13 June 2012 – 10 Aug 2013)
- (Ukraine) Hennadiy Orbu (interim) (10 Aug 2013 – 27 Nov 2013)
- (Ukraine) Serhiy Konovalov (interim) (27 Nov 2013 – 14 Jan 2014)
- (Bulgaria) Angel Chervenkov (14 Jan 2014 – 14 June 2014)
