= Oleksiy Babyr =

Ukrainian-Russian footballer

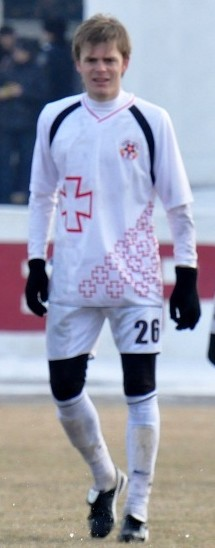

Personal information
- Full name: Oleksiy Olehovych Babyr
- Date of birth: 15 March 1990 (age 36)
- Place of birth: Simferopol, Ukrainian SSR
- Height: 1.88 m (6 ft 2 in)
- Position: Forward

Youth career
- 2003–2007: UOR Simferopol

Senior career*
Years	Team	Apps	(Gls)
2007–2009	Krymteplytsya Molodizhne	63	(7)
2010–2013	Volyn Lutsk	46	(0)
2013	→ Hoverla Uzhhorod (loan)	1	(0)
2014	Tosno	2	(0)
2015	Skif Simferopol		
2015	Yevpatoria	12	(1)
2016	Granit Mikashevichi	13	(3)
2016–2017	Neftekhimik Nizhnekamsk	35	(6)
2017–2018	Volgar Astrakhan	23	(2)
2018–2019	Neftekhimik Nizhnekamsk	19	(2)
2019–2020	Zvezda Perm	9	(0)
2020	Krymteplytsia Molodizhne	25	(13)
2021	TSK Simferopol	6	(0)
2021	Noah Jūrmala	10	(3)
2021	TSK Simferopol	9	(1)
2022	Gvardeyets Skvortsovo	7	(1)
2022–2023	Rubin Yalta	21	(8)
2024	Inkomsport-Zarechnoye	5	(1)

International career^{‡}
2008	Ukraine U19	1	(1)
2011–2012	Ukraine U21	5	(0)
- * Club domestic league appearances and goals as of 31 July 2024 ‡ National team caps and goals as of 13 March 2014

Oleksiy Babyr (Ukrainian: Олексій Олегович Бабир); Aleksey Babyr (Russian: Алексей Олегович Бабырь; born 15 March 1990) is a Ukrainian and Russian football forward.

== International career ==
Babyr was a member of Ukraine national under-21 football team, called up by Pavlo Yakovenko for friendly match against Czech Republic national under-21 football team on 17 November 2010.
