= Republican Football Federation of Crimea =

Republican Football Federation of Crimea (RFFK) (Note: Russian: Республиканская федерация футбола Крыма, romanized: Respublikanskaya federatsiya futbola Kryma; Ukrainian: Республіканська федерація футболу Криму, romanized: Respublikanska federatsiia futbolu Krymu) is a football governing body in the region of Crimea.

== History ==
Until 1954, the Crimean championship was part of the Russian football community. There were also republican as well as oblast champions.

Between 1954 and 1991 the regional Crimean champions were members of the Football Federation of Ukraine. In 1992-2014 Crimea as part of Ukraine conducted republican competitions. Since 2014, Crimea has been occupied by Russia.

== Champions ==
=== Russian SFSR ===
- 1939 FC Dynamo Simferopol
- 1940 FC Dynamo Simferopol (2)
- 1941–44 not held
- 1945 ODO Simferopol
- 1946 ODO Simferopol (2)
- 1947 FC Dynamo Simferopol (3)
- 1948 FC Molot Yevpatoriya
- 1949 FC Metallurg Kerch
- 1950 FC Metallurg Kerch (2)
- 1951 FC Molot Yevpatoriya (2)
- 1952 ODO Simferopol (3)
- 1953 FC Strela Yevpatoriya

=== Ukrainian SSR and Ukraine ===
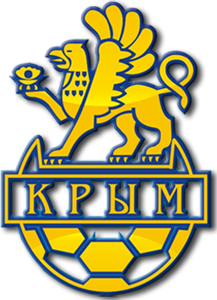
Original logo of the Football Federation of Crimea within Ukraine

- 1954 FC Metallurg Kerch (3)
- 1955 FC Molot Yevpatoriya (3)
- 1956 FC Metallurg Kerch (4)
- 1957 FC Burevisnyk Simferopol
- 1958 MBO Simferopol
- 1959 FC Spartak Simferopol
- 1960 FC Metallurg Kerch (5)
- 1961 FC Avanhard Kerch
- 1962 FC Metallurg Kerch (6)
- 1963 FC Avanhard Sevastopol
- 1964 FC Metalist Sevastopol
- 1965 FC Avanhard Kerch (2)
- 1966 FC Metalist Sevastopol (2)
- 1967 FC Molot Yevpatoriya (4)
- 1968 FC Avanhard Simferopol
- 1969 FC Koktebel Shchebetivka
- 1970 FC Koktebel Shchebetivka (2)
- 1971 FC Avanhard Simferopol (2)
- 1972 FC Avanhard Simferopol (3)
- 1973 FC Avanhard Simferopol (4)
- 1974 FC Avanhard Simferopol (5)
- 1975 FC Tytan Armyansk
- 1976 FC Tytan Armyansk (2)
- 1977 FC Tytan Armyansk (3)
- 1978 FC Tytan Armyansk (4)
- 1979 FC Tytan Armyansk (5)
- 1980 FC Tytan Armyansk (6)
- 1981 FC Tytan Armyansk (7)
- 1982 FC Metalist Sevastopol (3)
- 1983 FC Avanhard Dzhankoy
- 1984 FC Avanhard Dzhankoy (2)
- 1985 FC Tytan Armyansk (8)
- 1986 FC Tytan Armyansk (9)
- 1987 FC Avanhard Dzhankoy (2)
- 1988 FC Tytan Armyansk (10)
- 1989 FC Frunze Saky
- 1990 FC Tytan Armyansk (11)
- 1991 FC Syntez Armyansk
- =independence of Ukraine=
- 1992 FC Surozh Sudak
- 1993–94 FC Frunzenets-2 Saky (2)
- 1994–95 FC Chornomorets Sevastopol
- 1995–96 FC Portovyk Kerch (7)
- 1996–97 FC Surozh Sudak (2)
- 1997–98 FC SVKh-Danika Simferopol
- 1998–99 FC SVKh-Danika Simferopol (2)
- 1999–00 FC SVKh-Danika Simferopol (3)
- 2000–01 FC Danika-SELMA Simferopol (4)
- 2001 FC Lider Saky
- 2002 FC Krymteplytsia Molodizhne
- 2003 Tavria-TNU Simferopol
- 2004 FC Khimik Krasnoperekopsk
- 2005 FC Feniks-Illichovets Kalinine
- 2006 FC Yevpatoriya-2500
- 2007 FC Spartak Molodizhne
- 2008 FC Spartak Molodizhne (2)
- 2009 FC Spartak Molodizhne (3)
- 2010 FC Khimik Krasnoperekopsk (2)
- 2011 FC Hvardiyets Hvardiyske
- 2012 FC Hvardiyets Hvardiyske (2)
- 2013 FC Hvardiyets Hvardiyske (3)

==== Open Cup ====
- 2017 FC Myr Hornostayivka
- 2018 FC Myr Hornostayivka
- 2019 FC Krystal Kherson
- 2020 FC Krystal Kherson
- 2021 SC Tavriya Simferopol

=== Russian occupation ===
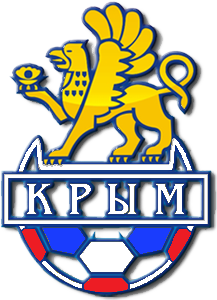
Modified logo after the Russian annexation of Crimea

- 2014 FC Gvardeets Hvardiyske (formerly FC Hvardiyets Hvardiyske)
- 2015 FC SKChF Sevastopol (All-Crimean tournament)

In 2015 there was established the Crimean Premier League.

- 2015–16 FC TSK Simferopol (Premier League)
  - FC Krymteplytsia Molodizhne (Open championship)
- 2016–17 FC Sevastopol (Premier League)
  - FC Gvardeets Hvardiyske (Open championship)
- 2017–18 FC Yevpatoriya (Premier League)
  - FC Artek Yalta (Open championship, refused promotion)
- 2018–19 FC Sevastopol (Premier League)
  - FC Favorit-VD Kafa Feodosia (Open Championship)

Note: From 1993–99 the championship was organized by fall-spring calendar. In 1999 the main competition was shifted back to the summer calendar. Therefore, there are two champions in 1999.

=== Top winners ===
==== Football Federation of Ukraine period ====
- 11 - FC Tytan Armyansk
- 5 - FC Metalurh (Portovyk) Kerch
- 5 - FC Avanhard Simferopol
- 4 - FC Metalist (Avanhard) Sevastopol
- 4 - FC (SVKh)-Danika-SELMA Simferopol
- 3 - Avanhard Dzh., Spartak M., Hvardiyets

==== Crimean Football Union period ====
- 3 - FC Dynamo Simferopol
- 3 - ODO Simferopol
- 2 - Molot, Metallurg, Gvardeets

Premier League

- 2 - FC Sevastopol
- 1 - FC TSK Simferopol, FC Yevpatoria

== Professional clubs ==
- FC Sudostroitel Sevastopol, 1949
- SKCF Sevastopol (DOF), 1960-1970
- SC Tavriya Simferopol (Avangard), 1960-2014 (since 2017 in Kherson), 2017-2021
- FC Okean Kerch (Metallurg, Avangard), 1963-1969, 1979-1995, 1996/97
- FC Chayka-VMS Sevastopol → FC Sevastopol (Avangard, Atlantika), 1964-1967, 1970-2014
  - FC Sevastopol-2, 2008/09, 2011-2013
- FC Tytan Armyansk, 1992-2014
- FC More Feodosia, 1992-1993
- FC Dynamo Saky (Frunzenets), 1992-1997
- FC Surozh Sudak, 1993/94
- FC Ihroservis Simferopol (Dynamo), 2001-2009
- FC Krymteplytsia Molodizhne, 2003-2013
- FC Khimik Krasnoperekopsk, 2005-2008
- FC Yalos Yalta, 2005/06
- FC Feniks-Illichovets Kalinine, 2006-2011
- FC Zhemchuzhyna Yalta, 2012/13

== Other clubs at national/republican level ==
Note: the list includes clubs that played at republican competitions before 1959 and the amateur or KFK competitions after 1964.

- Avanhard Sevastopol, 1954–1959
- Trud Simferopol, 1954
- Metalurh/Okean Kerch, 1954–1959, 1977, 1978
- Burevisnyk Simferopol, 1955–1957
- DOF/SKCF Sevastopol, 1956, 1988 – 1990
- Avanhard Simferopol, 1959, 1969 – 1973, 1975
- Kolhospnyk Ukrayina Yarkoe Pole, 1964
- Metalist Sevastopol, 1965, 1966, 1970, 1971, 1978
- Avanhard Kerch, 1966
- Molot Yevpatoria, 1968
- Koktebel Shchebetivka, 1970
- Chornomorets Sevastopol, 1972, 1973, 1996/97
- Atlantyka Sevastopol, 1974
- Tytan Armyansk, 1974 – 1982, 1985 – 1991
- Budivelnyk Yalta, 1976, 1979, 1980, 1982
- Avanhard Dzhankoy, 1977, 1978, 1981, 1984, 1988
- Meteor Simferopol, 1979 – 1981
- Chornomorets Yalta, 1981
- Vynohradar Alushta, 1983
- More Feodosia, 1989 – 1991, 1993/94
- Dynamo Saky, 1990, 1991, 1997/98
- Surozh Sudak, 1991, 1992/93, 1994/95
- Syvash Ishun, 1991
- Chaika Okhotnykove, 1993/94, 1994/95
- Portovyk Kerch, 1995/96
- SVKh-Danika Simferopol, 1998/99, 2000, 2001
- Hirnyk Balaklava, 1998/99
- Krymteplytsia Molodizhne, 2003
- Khimik Krasnoperekopsk, 2004
- Feniks-Illichovets Kalinine, 2005
- Yalos Yalta, 2005
- Chornomornaftohaz Simferopol, 2008
- Hvardiets Hvardiiske, 2012, 2013
- ITV Simferopol, 2012, 2013
- Zhemchuzhyna Yalta, 2012
- Foros Yalta, 2012
- Tavria Simferopol, 2016/17

== See also ==
- Regional football federations of Ukraine
- Crimean Premier League
- Crimea national football team
- Crimean Tatars national football team
