= Dmytro Brovkin =

Ukrainian footballer

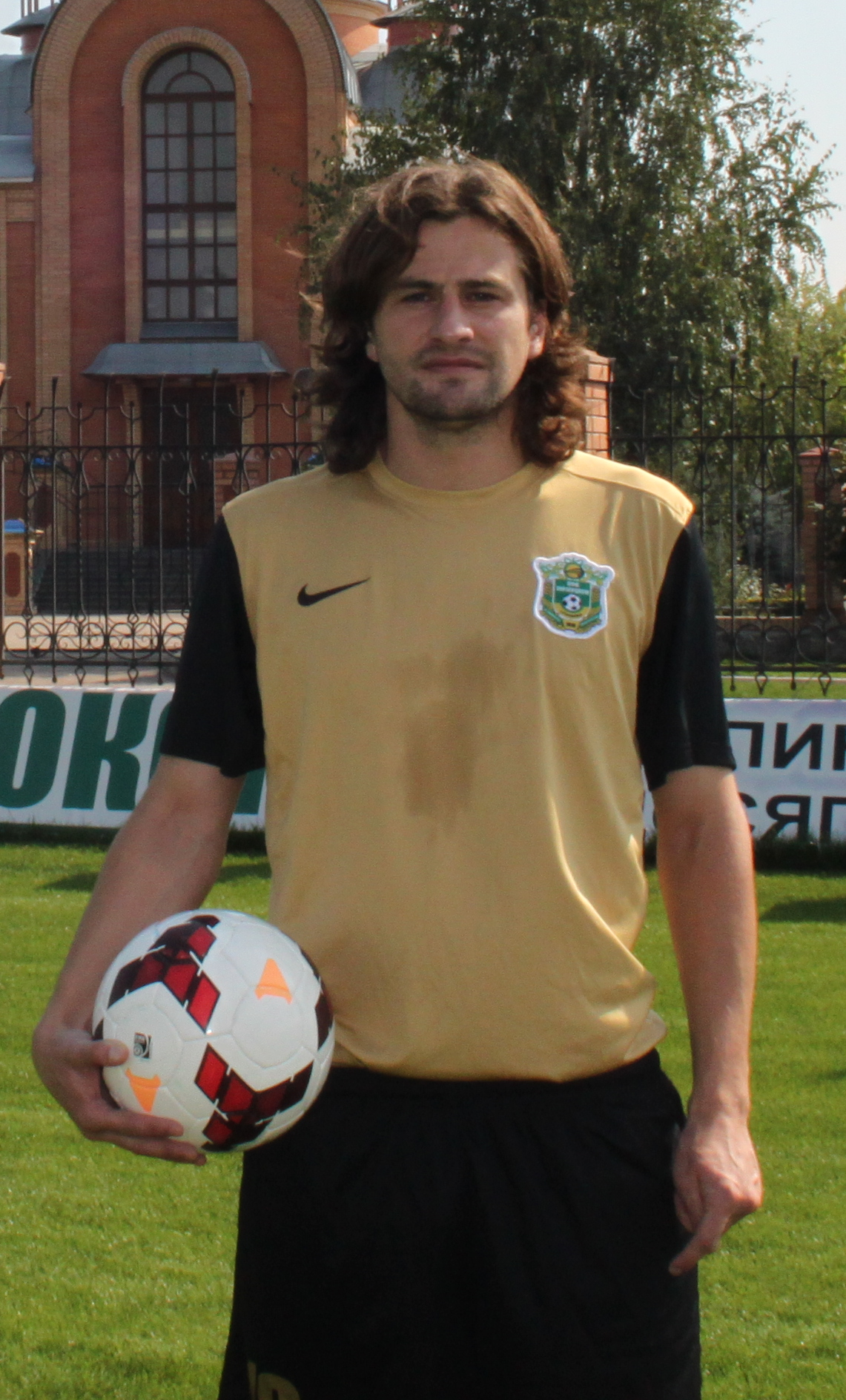
- Brovkin in 2013

Personal information
- Full name: Dmytro Valeriyovych Brovkin
- Date of birth: 11 May 1984 (age 42)
- Place of birth: Kukushkine, Crimea Oblast, Ukrainian SSR, Soviet Union
- Height: 1.81 m (5 ft 11 1/2 in)
- Position: Forward

Senior career*
Years	Team	Apps	(Gls)
2001–2003	Dynamo-3 Kyiv	41	(10)
2001–2003	Dynamo-2 Kyiv	29	(7)
2004	Metalist Kharkiv	21	(4)
2005	Obolon Kyiv	1	(0)
2005–2006	Vorskla Poltava	29	(2)
2007	AC Oulu	7	(1)
2007–2008	Zorya Luhansk	17	(4)
2009	Spartakus Szarowola	14	(9)
2010	Prykarpattya Ivano-Frankivsk	13	(4)
2010	Arsenal Bila Tserkva	14	(4)
2011	Helios Kharkiv	7	(1)
2011–2012	Mykolaiv	25	(7)
2012–2013	Desna Chernihiv	30	(4)
2013–2014	UkrAhroKom Holovkivka	21	(5)
2015	Gvardeyets Gvardeyskoye		
2015–2016	Rubin Yalta	26	(4)
2016–2017	Bakhchisaray	19	(6)
2017–2018	Kyzyltash Bakhchisaray	25	(8)
2018–2019	Kafa Feodosia	28	(26)
2019	Gvardeyets Gvardeyskoye		
2020	Rubin Yalta		
2020–2021	FC Yalta		

International career
	Ukraine U21	8	(3)
- * Club domestic league appearances and goals

Dmytro Valeriyovych Brovkin (Ukrainian: Дмитро Валерійович Бровкін; born 11 May 1984) is a Ukrainian former professional footballer who played as a striker. His first goal for Mykolaiv was scored on 21 August 2011 against Lviv.

== Honours ==
Desna Chernihiv

- Ukrainian Second League: 2012–13
