= Serhiy Lezhentsev =

Ukrainian footballer and coach

Personal information
- Full name: Serhiy Borysovych Lezhentsev
- Date of birth: 4 August 1971 (age 55)
- Place of birth: Simferopol, Crimean Oblast, Ukrainian SSR, Soviet Union (now Ukraine)
- Height: 1.81 m (5 ft 11 in)
- Position: Defender

Youth career
- Tavriya sports school

Senior career*
Years	Team	Apps	(Gls)
1987	Tavriya Simferopol	2	(0)
1990–1991	Okean Kerch	71	(2)
1992–1993	Kremin Kremenchuk	44	(0)
1993–1994	Nyva Ternopil	31	(4)
1994–1996	Dynamo Kyiv	28	(0)
1995–1996	→ Dynamo-2 Kyiv	7	(0)
1996–1997	Chornomorets Odesa	30	(0)
1997–1998	Vorskla Poltava	28	(0)
1997–1998	→ Vorskla-2 Poltava	8	(0)
1999	Tavriya Simferopol	5	(1)
1999–2000	Vorskla Poltava	11	(1)
1999–2000	→ Vorskla-2 Poltava	7	(0)
2001	Metalist Kharkiv	5	(0)
2001	→ Metalist-2 Kharkiv	2	(0)
2001–2002	Kryvbas Kryvyi Rih	5	(0)
2002–2004	Sevastopol	27	(0)

International career
1993–1996	Ukraine	7	(0)

Managerial career
- 2004–2005: Tytan Armiansk
- 2005: Dynamo-Ihroservice Simferopol
- 2006: Feniks-Illichovets Kalinine
- 2006–2007: Feniks-Illichovets Kalinine (assistant)
- 2009–2010: Foros (assistant)
- 2012: Ahrokapital Suvorovske
- 2012: Tavriya Simferopol (reserves)
- 2012: Tavriya Simferopol (assistant)
- 2015: Berkut Armyansk
- 2016–2017: KFU-Bakhchysarai
- 2017–2018: Rubin Yalta
- 2018–2020: Rubin Yalta
- 2020: Tuapse
- * Club domestic league appearances and goals

Serhiy Borysovych Lezhentsev (Ukrainian: Сергій Борисович Леженцев); Sergey Lezhentsev (Russian: Сергей Борисович Леженцев; born 4 August 1971) is a Ukrainian football coach and a former player.

== Coaching career ==
On 6 October 2020, he was banned from football activity for one year by the Russian Football Union for fielding two unregistered players under false names in a game between the club he was managing, Tuapse and SKA Rostov-on-Don on 21 September 2020.

== Personal life ==
In 2014, after the annexation of the Crimea to Russia, he acquired Russian citizenship as Sergey Lezhentsev. In 2018, he joined the Putin Team public movement.
