= Maksim Mineyev =

Russian footballer

Personal information
- Full name: Maksim Vladimirovich Mineyev
- Date of birth: 30 January 1984 (age 42)
- Place of birth: Barysh, Ulyanovsk Oblast, Russian SFSR
- Height: 1.89 m (6 ft 2 in)
- Position: Defender

Senior career*
Years	Team	Apps	(Gls)
2001	FC Lada-Energiya Dimitrovgrad	0	(0)
2003–2004	FC Volga Ulyanovsk	43	(3)
2005	FC Alnas Almetyevsk	1	(0)
2006	FC Mordovia Saransk	22	(3)
2007–2008	FC Volga Ulyanovsk	44	(9)
2009	FC Nosta Novotroitsk	15	(0)
2010–2012	FC Volga Ulyanovsk	32	(1)
2012–2013	FC Dynamo Kirov	24	(2)
2013–2014	FC Volga Ulyanovsk	23	(4)
2014–2015	FC Dynamo Barnaul	24	(3)
2015	FC MITOS Novocherkassk	9	(1)
2016	FC Volga Ulyanovsk	8	(0)
2017	FC Rubin Yalta		
2017	FC Kafa Feodosia		
2017	FC Rubin Yalta		
2018	FC Titan Klin (amateur)		
2018–2019	FC Ocean Kerch		
- * Club domestic league appearances and goals

Maksim Vladimirovich Mineyev (Russian: Максим Владимирович Минеев; born 30 January 1984) is a Russian former professional football player.

== Club career ==
He played two seasons in the Russian Football National League for FC Volga Ulyanovsk and FC Nosta Novotroitsk.
