= Maksym Prykhodnoy =

Ukrainian-born Russian footballer

Personal information
- Full name: Maksym Serhiyovych Prykhodnoy
- Date of birth: 27 October 1992 (age 34)
- Place of birth: Simferopol, Ukraine
- Height: 1.82 m (6 ft 0 in)
- Position: Midfielder

Youth career
- 1999–2006: SC Tavriya Simferopol
- 2007: FC Karpaty Lviv
- 2007–2009: SC Tavriya Simferopol
- 2009: FC Kosmos Zaporizhia

Senior career*
| Years | Team | Apps | (Gls) |
| 2009–2014 | SC Tavriya Simferopol | 16 | (0) |
| 2014 | FC Hirnyk-Sport Komsomolsk | 11 | (0) |
| 2015–2016 | TSK Simferopol | | |
| 2017–2023 | FC Krymteplytsia Molodizhne | | |
- * Club domestic league appearances and goals

Maksym Prykhodnoy (Ukrainian: Максим Сергійович Приходной; Maksim Prikhodnoy (Russian: Максим Сергеевич Приходной; born 27 October 1992) is a former professional Ukraine-born Russian football midfielder. He acquired Russian citizenship in 2014.

== Career ==
Prykhodnoy was born in the family of amateur footballer Serhiy Prykhodonoy, who played in FC Lokomotyv Simferopol. In age 6 years old he became attended the Sportive youth school of SC Tavriya Simferopol. His first trainer was Oleksandr Bilozerskyi.

Prykhodnoy made his debut for SC Tavriya Simferopol played in the main-squad team against FC Zorya Luhansk on 26 May 2013 in Ukrainian Premier League.
