= Rollan Pohoreltsev =

Ukrainian-born Russian footballer

Personal information
- Full name: Rollan Serhiyovych Pohoreltsev
- Date of birth: 16 July 1990 (age 36)
- Place of birth: Saky, Ukrainian SSR
- Height: 1.88 m (6 ft 2 in)
- Position: Defender

Youth career
- 2005–2007: FC Shakhtar Donetsk

Senior career*
Years	Team	Apps	(Gls)
2007–2009	FC Ihroservice Simferopol	16	(0)
2010	FC Spartak Molodizhne	2	(0)
2010–2011	FC Krymteplytsia Molodizhne	1	(0)
2010	→ FC Feniks-Illichovets Kalinine (loan)	8	(1)
2011–2013	SC Tavriya Simferopol	3	(0)
2013	FC Karlivka	12	(2)
2014	FC Shakhtar Sverdlovsk	9	(2)
2015	FC Anapa (amateur)		
2016	FC TSK Simferopol	26	(6)
2016	FC Neftekhimik Nizhnekamsk	9	(0)
2017–2018	FC TSK Simferopol		
2018–2019	FC Krymteplytsia Molodizhne		
- * Club domestic league appearances and goals

Rollan Pohoreltsev (Ukrainian: Роллан Сергійович Погорельцев); Rollan Pogoreltsev (Russian: Роллан Сергеевич Погорельцев; born 16 July 1990) is a Ukrainian-born Russian former football defender.

== Club career ==
Pohoreltsev began his playing career with Shakhtar Donetsk's youth team. Than he spent some years in Shakhtar Donetsk football system. His first trainer was N. Lanchak. Than Pohoreltsev played for some Crimean teams of different levels, and in February 2010 he signed two years deal with FC Krymteplytsia, but next year become SC Tavriya's player.

In the debut of the Crimea championship soccer match for TSC scored the second goal of the Sevastopol SKChF.
