= Bakhchisaray (disambiguation) =

Bakhchisaray (Russian: Бахчисара́й) may refer to:

- Bakhchysarai, a city in Crimea
- Bakhchisaray, Republic of Bashkortostan
- FC Bakhchisaray, a football club

== See also ==
- Bahçesaray, a district and municipality of Turkey
