= Yanis Linda =

Russian footballer

Personal information
- Full name: Yanis Igorevich Linda
- Date of birth: 1 March 1994 (age 32)
- Height: 1.80 m (5 ft 11 in)
- Position: Defender

Team information
- Current team: Sakhalinets Moscow (fitness coach)

Youth career
- 2011–2012: KAMAZ Naberezhnye Chelny
- 2012–2013: Lokomotiv Moscow

Senior career*
Years	Team	Apps	(Gls)
2014–2016	Lokomotiv Liski	41	(0)
2016–2017	Arsenal-2 Tula	20	(1)
2017–2018	Khimik Novomoskovsk	20	(1)
2018	Inkomsport Yalta	13	(3)
2019–2020	Krymteplytsia Molodizhne	27	(0)
2020	Gorodeya	4	(0)
2021	Krymteplytsia Molodizhne	7	(0)

Managerial career
- 2022–: Sakhalinets Moscow (fitness coach)
- * Club domestic league appearances and goals

Yanis Igorevich Linda (Russian: Янис Игоревич Линда; born 1 March 1994) is a Russian football coach and a former player. He works as a fitness coach with Sakhalinets Moscow.

== Club career ==
He made his professional debut in the Russian Professional Football League for FC Lokomotiv Liski on 19 May 2014 in a game against FC Dynamo Bryansk.
