= Football in Crimea =

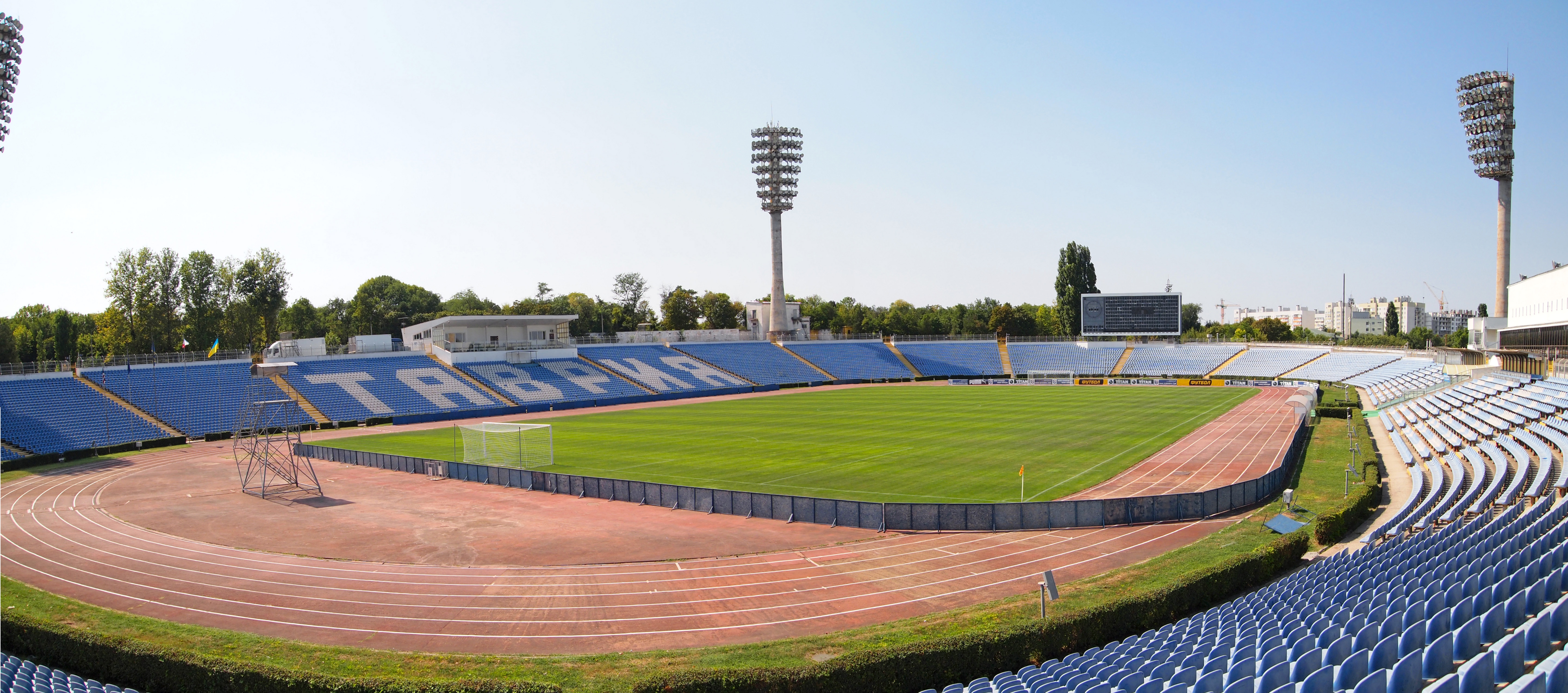
Panoramic view of Lokomotiv Stadium in Simferopol, Crimea

Football in Crimea is governed by the Republican Football Federation of Crimea. Since the Russian annexation of Crimea in 2014, the Federation joined the Russian Football Union. The professional clubs of Crimea were reincorporated under the Russian jurisdiction and placed in the Russian Second League, while previously competing in various Ukrainian leagues. Due to protest from the Football Federation of Ukraine, UEFA ordered to remove Crimean clubs from the Russian professional competitions and instead organized special competitions under auspices of a Crimean Football Union, while preserving the Republican Football Federation of Crimea. The top league in Crimea is the Crimean Premier League which has 7 teams.

== History ==
At the time of the first establishment of an official football governing body in Russia - 19 January 1912 – Crimea was part of the Russian Empire. The all-Russian Football Union went on to join FIFA on 30 June 1912. After the 1917 October Revolution where Russian empire gave place to Soviet Union, the later took the seat at FIFA and UEFA which belonged to Russian empire. Since the establishment of the Soviet Union, Crimean clubs participated in the Ukrainian Soviet competitions as early as 1920, but soon were withdrawn and restored to Russian competitions. After transfer of Crimea in 1954, the Crimean clubs rejoined Ukrainian competitions, among which were Avanhard Sevastopol, Trud Simferopol, and Metalurh Kerch.

Among the most noticeable clubs of the region is SC Tavriya Simferopol that won three championships of the Ukrainian SSR as well as the Ukrainian Top League.

Despite the Russian annexation of Crimea in March 2014, the teams from Crimea, Sevastopol and Tavriya Simferopol, continued to participate in the Ukrainian Premier League until the end of the season. However, they were then disbanded and reformed under Russian laws, seeking to join the Russian league system for the 2014/15 season. Three Crimean clubs finally briefly joined a Russian regional division, but they were expelled after UEFA ruled against the move.

In March 2015, UEFA announced that it would treat Crimea as a “special zone,” as neither Russian nor Ukrainian, and that it would help Crimea develop its own soccer system. In return, Russia agreed that the Crimean clubs would not ask to play in European competitions for at least two years.

== Players ==
Several players from Crimea played for the Ukraine national football team, among which Serhiy Lezhentsev, Serhiy Kovalets, Denys Holaido, Serhiy Yesin, Oleksandr Svystunov, and Oleksandr Yevtushok.

Some Crimean players played for the Russia national football team, among which is Evgeni Aldonin who is the only player to play for the senior team.

== See also ==
- Crimean Premier League
- Crimean Tatars national football team
- Crimea national football team
