= 1978 KFK competitions (Ukraine) =

KFK competitions
- Season: 1978
- Champions: Metalurh Dniprodzerzhynsk

The 1978 KFK competitions in Ukraine were part of the 1978 Soviet KFK competitions that were conducted in the Soviet Union. It was 14th season of the KFK in Ukraine since its introduction in 1964. The winner eventually qualified to the 1979 Soviet Second League.

== First stage ==
=== Group 1 ===
Pos	Team	Pld	W	D	L	GF	GA	GD	Pts
1	Sokil Lviv	18	11	4	3	25	9	+16	26
2	LVVPU Lviv	18	9	3	6	29	14	+15	21
3	Elektron Zbarazh	18	7	7	4	22	25	−3	21
4	Elektron Ivano-Frankivsk	18	6	7	5	22	16	+6	19
5	Burevisnyk Ternopil	18	7	5	6	19	19	0	19
6	Prohres Berdychiv	18	8	1	9	30	27	+3	17
7	Prylad Lutsk	18	7	2	9	19	18	+1	16
8	Torpedo Rovno	18	5	5	8	18	23	−5	15
9	Budivelnyk Borodianka	18	6	3	9	19	32	−13	15
10	Silmash Kolomyia	18	3	5	10	11	31	−20	11

Source: ukr-football.org.ua

=== Group 2 ===
Pos	Team	Pld	W	D	L	GF	GA	GD	Pts
1	Urozhai Kolchino	0	-	-	-	-	-	—	0
2	Shakhtar Chervonohrad	0	-	-	-	-	-	—	0
3	Refryzherator Fastiv	18	7	5	6	23	20	+3	19
4	Burevisnyk Kamianets-Podilskyi	18	8	2	8	24	20	+4	18
5	Khimik Novyi Rozdol	18	7	4	7	23	25	−2	18
6	Naftovyk Dolyna	18	5	7	6	33	34	−1	17
7	Vatra Ternopil	0	-	-	-	-	-	—	0
8	Shkirianyk Berdychiv	18	5	5	8	18	22	−4	15
9	Siret Storozhynets	18	4	7	7	19	25	−6	15
10	Intehral Vinnytsia	18	4	7	7	21	29	−8	15

Source: ukr-football.org.ua

=== Group 3 ===
Pos	Team	Pld	W	D	L	GF	GA	GD	Pts
1	Bilshovyk Kyiv	18	12	4	2	20	8	+12	28
2	Radyst Kirovohrad	18	8	7	3	21	14	+7	23
3	Avanhard Lozova	18	9	2	7	20	15	+5	20
4	Frehat Pervomaisk	18	8	4	6	17	15	+2	20
5	Iskra Voznesensk	18	7	6	5	26	20	+6	20
6	Burevisnyk Poltava	18	7	4	7	19	12	+7	18
7	Vostok Kyiv	18	6	4	8	16	15	+1	16
8	Khvylia Mykolaiv	18	5	6	7	19	19	0	16
9	Rubin Piskivka	18	4	3	11	12	24	−12	11
10	Svema Shostka	18	2	4	12	8	36	−28	8

Source: ukr-football.org.ua

=== Group 4 ===
Pos	Team	Pld	W	D	L	GF	GA	GD	Pts
1	Metalurh Dniprodzerzhynsk	18	13	4	1	31	9	+22	30
2	Kolos Pavlohrad	18	11	4	3	17	11	+6	26
3	Promin Chernihiv	18	10	5	3	20	12	+8	25
4	Sputnik Poltava	18	8	6	4	21	12	+9	22
5	Lokomotyv Smila	18	5	5	8	19	24	−5	15
6	Shakhtar Oleksandriya	18	5	4	9	19	31	−12	14
7	Kolos Zolochiv	18	6	1	11	22	27	−5	13
8	Chervonyi Ekskavator Kyiv	18	3	7	8	19	26	−7	13
9	Lokomotyv Znamianka	18	2	7	9	12	20	−8	11
10	Sudnobudivnyk Mykolaiv	18	3	5	10	10	18	−8	11

Source: ukr-football.org.ua

=== Group 5 ===
Pos	Team	Pld	W	D	L	GF	GA	GD	Pts
1	Okean Kerch	18	14	2	2	32	12	+20	30
2	Enerhiya Nova Kakhovka	18	12	5	1	36	14	+22	29
3	Tytan Armyansk	18	11	4	3	43	26	+17	26
4	Transformator Zaporizhia	18	11	2	5	46	21	+25	24
5	ZKL Dnipropetrovsk	18	6	3	9	29	32	−3	15
6	Azovets Berdiansk	18	3	7	8	17	33	−16	13
7	Portovyk Illichivsk	18	5	3	10	20	28	−8	13
8	Kolos Skadovsk	18	5	2	11	24	34	−10	12
9	Metalist Sevastopol	18	3	3	12	14	30	−16	9
10	Avanhard Dzhankoy	18	3	3	12	29	60	−31	9

Source: ukr-football.org.ua

=== Group 6 ===
Pos	Team	Pld	W	D	L	GF	GA	GD	Pts
1	Metalurh Kupiansk	0	-	-	-	-	-	—	0
2	Shakhtobudivnyk Donetsk	16	7	4	5	21	18	+3	18
3	Monolit Donetsk	0	-	-	-	-	-	—	0
4	Shakhtar Stakhanov	16	6	5	5	20	15	+5	17
5	Avanhard Vilnohirsk	16	6	5	5	16	16	0	17
6	Press Dnipropetrovsk	16	7	2	7	29	24	+5	16
7	Komunarets Komunarsk	16	6	4	6	20	18	+2	16
8	Shakhtar Sverdlovsk	16	4	3	9	28	36	−8	11
9	Khimik Sloviansk	16	2	4	10	10	25	−15	8

Source: ukr-football.org.ua

== Final ==
Pos	Team	Pld	W	D	L	GF	GA	GD	Pts	Promotion
1	Metalurh Dniprodzerzhynsk	5	5	0	0	9	3	+6	10	Promoted to Second League
2	Bilshovyk Kyiv	5	3	1	1	4	2	+2	7	
3	Okean Kerch	5	2	0	3	4	4	0	4	
4	Urozhai Kolchino	5	1	2	2	2	5	−3	4	
5	Metalurh Kupiansk	5	1	1	3	3	5	−2	3	
6	Sokil Lviv	5	0	2	3	2	5	−3	2	

Source: ukr-football.org.ua
