= Ilya Glebov (footballer) =

Russian footballer

Personal information
- Full name: Ilya Aleksandrovich Glebov
- Date of birth: 16 January 2001 (age 25)
- Place of birth: Lipetsk, Russia
- Height: 1.81 m (5 ft 11 in)
- Position: Right winger

Youth career
- Metallurg Lipetsk

Senior career*
Years	Team	Apps	(Gls)
2020–2024	Metallurg Lipetsk	79	(18)
2025	Rubin Yalta	14	(1)
- * Club domestic league appearances and goals as of 1 November 2025

Ilya Aleksandrovich Glebov (Russian: Илья Александрович Глебов; born 16 January 2001) is a Russian football player.

== Club career ==
He made his debut in the Russian Football National League for Metallurg Lipetsk on 31 July 2021 in a game against Neftekhimik Nizhnekamsk.
