= Pavel Sultanov =

Russian footballer

Personal information
- Full name: Pavel Vladimirovich Sultanov
- Date of birth: 17 July 1993 (age 33)
- Place of birth: Sochi, Russia
- Height: 1.74 m (5 ft 9 in)
- Position: Midfielder

Youth career
- 2006–2007: Dnipro Cherkasy
- 2008–2011: Zhemchuzhina Sochi

Senior career*
Years	Team	Apps	(Gls)
2011–2012	Baltika Kaliningrad	0	(0)
2012	Avangard Kursk	1	(0)
2013	Zorya Bilozirya	10	(2)
2014–2015	Saturn Ramenskoye	23	(1)
2015–2016	Lada Togliatti	7	(0)
2016	Slavia Mozyr	9	(0)
2017	Ruch Wysokie Mazowieckie	14	(0)
2017	Çal Belediyespor	4	(0)
2018	LNZ-Lebedyn	5	(0)
2018	Acıpayam Belediyespor		
2019	Torbalispor		
2019–2020	Inkomsport Yalta	11	(0)
- * Club domestic league appearances and goals

Pavel Vladimirovich Sultanov (Russian: Павел Владимирович Султанов; born 17 July 1993) is a Russian former footballer who played as a midfielder.

== Career ==
He made his debut in the Russian First Division for Avangard Kursk on 28 October 2012 in a game against Fakel Voronezh.
