= PFC Berkut Armyansk =

Berkut Armyansk
- Full name: Professional'nyy futbol'nyy klub Berkut Armyansk
- Founded: 2015
- Dissolved: 2016
- Ground: Khimik Stadium, Armyansk
- Capacity: 3.500
- League: Crimean Premier League
- 2015–16: 8th (withdrew, defunct)
Home colours

PFC Berkut Armyansk (Russian: ПФК "Беркут" Армянск) was a football team based in Armyansk, Crimea.

The club on the basis of which "Berkut" was created, was called "Agrocapital" (Suvorovskoye) and represented the Saky Raion at the republican level. In 2011, Ahrokapital Suvorovske competed in the Ukrainian Amateur Cup.

On April 30, 2016, the club's players boycotted the match against Bakhchisaray due to salary arrears, the match did not take place, and the club was awarded a forfeit defeat due to the non-appearance of the players. Most of the players arbitrarily left the club and were removed from the squad, and on May 12, 2016, the club withdrew from the Crimean Premier League and was disbanded.

== Team names ==
- 2015 – PFC Berkut Yevpatoria
- 2016 – PFC Berkut Armyansk

== League and cup history (Crimea) ==
Season	Div.	Pos.	Pl.	W	D	L	GS	GA	P	Domestic Cup	Europe	Notes
2015	1st All-Crimean Championship Gr. B	5_{/10}	9	5	2	2	27	27	17			Reorganization of competitions
2015–16	1st Premier League	8_{/8}	28	1	7	20	18	61	10	Group stage		Withdrew
