= Crimea national football team =

Crimean football team

Crimea
- Association: Crimean Football Union (Крымский футбольный союз)
- Head coach: Valeriy Petrov
First colours	Second colours

First international
- Crimea 2–1 Yekaterinoslav (Soviet Union) (Kharkiv; September 1923)

Biggest win
- Crimea 5–0 FC Rostselmash (Russia) (Sevastopol; 13 March 2017)

Biggest defeat
- Crimea 0–3 NSFL team (Russia) (Evpatoria; 17 May 2017)

Crimea national football team is a football national team representing the Crimea peninsula in international and local friendly matches. The team is controlled by the Crimean Football Union. Crimea is not a member of FIFA nor UEFA or ConIFA.

== History ==
The first known performances of the Crimean national team date back to September 1923, when the peninsula national team took part in the First All-Ukrainian Spartakiad in Kharkiv (in some later sources this tournament is called Ukrainian SSR Championship 1923) In their first match, the semifinals of group 2 (1/8 finals of the general tournament), the Crimeans beat the team Yekaterinoslav 2–1, in the next game (the finals of their group or 1/4 finals of the tournament) lost to the team Druzhkivka 0–2. The details of the matches and the composition of the Crimean national team did not survive. There is no information about the existence of the national team in the next 60 years.

In 1986, in preparation for FIFA World Cup 1986 USSR national team held a control game with the Crimea national team composed of Simferopol football players "Tavria, Kerch "Ocean" and Sevastopol "Atlantic." The match ended with the score 3–2 in favour of the USSR national team.

In 2006, Crimean Tatars national football team was created from Crimean Tatars living on the peninsula and beyond, to participate in the tournament ELF Cup, which immediately reached the final of the cup and took second place, subsequently the team played in a number of tournaments for teams not included in FIFA (group stage Europeada-2016).

The national team representing the current Republic of Crimea for the first time can be said in light of the fact that on 4 December 2014, at a meeting of the UEFA Executive Committee, it was decided to ban Crimean clubs from taking part in competitions organised on 1 January 2015 by Russian Football Union. In response to this decision, fans of the Sevastopol club SKChF made with an initiative to hold an action aimed at supporting Ku Sevastopol and Crimean football. On 14 December 2014, within the framework of this action, the “Friendship Match” was organised, in which the team of the Republic of Crimea opposed the team of the city of Sevastopol. The main time of the game ended with a score of 2–2. In the penalty shootout with a score of 4–3, the team of Sevastopol won.

The football team of the Republic of Crimea and the city of federal significance Sevastopol was created on 18 November 2016 at a meeting of the Presidium of the Crimean Football Union. Also, as part of the meeting, a decision was made on the coaching staff of the team, the former coach of Tavria football clubs and Sevastopol Valery Petrov was appointed as the head coach, and the former Donetsk player Shakhtar, Metalurh, as well as Kryvbas - Sergey Dranov and former player Ukraine national football team Oleksiy Antyukhin. Another former player of the Ukraine national team - Maksym Startsev has been appointed goalkeeper coach.

The presentation of the national team took place within the framework of the I Crimean Football Forum on 9 December 2016. The official date for the creation of the national team of Crimea was set on 13 March 2017, since this day in Sevastopol Crimeans held their first international friendly match in the framework of the Crimean Spring tournament with the amateur football club Rostselmash (Rostov-on-Don), winning 5–0.

After 2018 World Cup a friendly match was planned with the Syrian national team, however it did not take place.

The last match of the Crimea national team was held on 15 October 2019. Within the framework of the Third International Forum "Crimea in the global scientific and educational space" Crimeans played with the "Peace Team", a selection team which included foreign students studying in Crimea, representing Syria, Jordan, Iraq, Afghanistan, India, Egypt and Uzbekistan. The main time of the match ended with a score of 3–3, and only in the penalty shootout the foreign students proved to be stronger, winning with a score of 3–2.

== See also ==
- Crimean Premier League
- Football in Crimea
- Crimean Tatars national football team
