= Danila Polshikov =

Russian footballer

Personal information
- Full name: Danila Igorevich Polshikov
- Date of birth: 6 December 2001 (age 24)
- Place of birth: Krasnoyarsk, Russia
- Height: 1.68 m (5 ft 6 in)
- Position: Midfielder

Team information
- Current team: FC Rubin Yalta
- Number: 11

Senior career*
Years	Team	Apps	(Gls)
2018–2021	FC Yenisey Krasnoyarsk	1	(0)
2021–2024	FC Yenisey-2 Krasnoyarsk	72	(13)
2022–2024	FC Yenisey Krasnoyarsk	2	(0)
2024–	FC Rubin Yalta	43	(6)

International career^{‡}
2019	Russia U18	3	(0)
- * Club domestic league appearances and goals as of 31 October 2026 ‡ National team caps and goals as of 14 June 2019

Danila Igorevich Polshikov (Russian: Данила Игоревич Польшиков; born 6 December 2001) is a Russian football player who plays for FC Rubin Yalta.

== Club career ==
He made his debut in the Russian Football National League for FC Yenisey Krasnoyarsk on 27 September 2020 in a game against FC Krasnodar-2.
