= Oleksandr Bilozerskyi =

Ukrainian footballer and coach

Personal information
- Full name: Oleksandr Pavlovych Bilozerskyi
- Date of birth: 4 May 1964 (age 62)
- Height: 1.83 m (6 ft 0 in)
- Positions: Striker; midfielder

Senior career*
Years	Team	Apps	(Gls)
1981–1983	Tavriya Simferopol	56	(5)
1984	SKA Odesa	28	(0)
1986–1989	Okean Kerch	173	(28)
1990	Volyn Lutsk	34	(4)
1990–1992	KSZO Ostrowiec Świętokrzyski		
1992–1993	Blekitni Kielce	32	(0)
1993–1995	Druzhba Berdiansk	59	(12)
1996	Kryvbas Kryvyi Rih	14	(1)
1996–1997	Kremin Kremenchuk	18	(0)
1998–1999	Zirka Kirovohrad	54	(1)
1998–1999	→ Zirka-2 Kirovohrad	6	(1)
2000	Podillya Khmelnytskyi	14	(2)
2000–2001	FC SVKh-Danika Simferopol		

Managerial career
- 2008–2009: SC Tavriya Simferopol (youth)
- * Club domestic league appearances and goals

Oleksandr Pavlovych Bilozerskyi (born 4 May 1964) is a Ukrainian professional football coach and a former player.
