= Maksym Startsev =

Ukrainian footballer (born 1980)

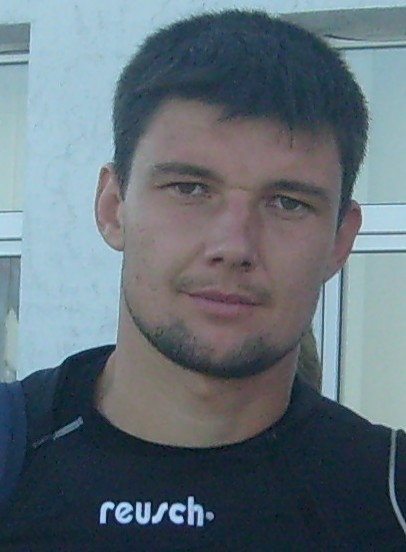

Personal information
- Full name: Maksym Oleksandrovych Startsev
- Date of birth: 20 January 1980 (age 46)
- Place of birth: Kherson, Ukrainian SSR
- Height: 1.90 m (6 ft 3 in)
- Position: Goalkeeper

Youth career
- FC Krystal Kherson

Senior career*
Years	Team	Apps	(Gls)
1998–2004	Dnipro Dnipropetrovsk	79	(0)
1998–2003	Dnipro-2 Dnipropetrovsk	45	(0)
2000–2002	Dnipro-3 Dnipropetrovsk	15	(1)
2004	Kryvbas	3	(0)
2004	Kryvbas-2 Kryvyi Rih	5	(0)
2004–2005	Tavriya Simferopol	15	(0)
2005–2007	Kryvbas Kryvyi Rih	27	(0)
2007–2008	Dnipro Dnipropetrovsk	28	(0)
2009–2010	Tavriya Simferopol	28	(0)
2010–2012	Metalist Kharkiv	8	(0)
2012–2013	Volyn Lutsk	16	(0)
2013–2015	Metalurh Zaporizhya	31	(0)

International career
2005	Ukraine	2	(0)

Managerial career
- 2016: FC Krymteplytsia Molodizhne
- 2017: FC TSK Simferopol
- * Club domestic league appearances and goals

Maksym Oleksandrovych Startsev (Ukrainian: Максим Олександрович Старцев; born 20 January 1980) is a Ukrainian former football player and coach. A goalkeeper, he played for Kryvbas Kryvyi Rih, Dnipro Dnipropetrovsk, Tavriya Simferopol, and Metalurh Zaporizhya in the Ukrainian Premier League.
