= FC Tuapse =

Russian football club

- Full name: Football Club Tuapse
- Founded: 2020
- Dissolved: 2022
- 2021–22: FNL 2, Group 1, 14th
- Website: http://www.fctuapse.ru/
Home colours	Away colours

FC Tuapse (Russian: ФК «Туапсе») was a Russian football team based in Tuapse. For 2020–21 season, it received the license for the third-tier Russian Professional Football League.

== History ==
On 6 October 2020, the club manager Serhiy Lezhentsev was banned from football activity for one year by the Russian Football Union for fielding two unregistered players under false names in a game against FC SKA Rostov-on-Don on 21 September 2020. The club was also fined and a 0–3 loss was assigned to it in a game against SKA.

In December 2021, due to continuing filing of falsified paperwork and fielding ineligible players, the club was excluded from the professional league and demoted to the fourth tier. In February 2022, that decision was reversed on appeal and the club was docked 9 points in the 2021–22 season instead.

The club did not receive the license for the 2022–23 season.
