= Crimean Premier League =

Men's association football league organized by Crimean Football Union

- Founded: 2015; 11 years ago
- Country: Russian Federation
- Region: Crimea
- Confederation: UEFA
- Number of clubs: 7
- Level on pyramid: 5
- Promotion to: Russian Second League
- Relegation to: Crimean Open Championship
- Domestic cup(s): Crimean Cup; Crimean Super Cup
- Most championships: FC Sevastopol; 5 titles
- Website: cfu2015.com
- Current: 2026 Crimean Premier League

The KFS Premier-Liga (Russian: Премьер-лига КФС, romanized: Premyer-liga KFS) or simply Crimean Premier League is the highest football league in Crimea organized by the Crimean Football Union (Krymsky Futbolny Soyuz) and devised by Russia in the wake of the 2014 Russian annexation of Crimea.

For full list of Crimean champions, see Republican Football Federation of Crimea. the legal status of Crimean Football Union is not recognized by the Ukrainian Association of Football. The professional status of the league could not be verified initially. Despite restrictions from UEFA, in 2023 teams were admitted to the Russian third tier competitions, while other teams joined the so called Sodruzhestvo Liga (Commonwealth League) or later created Crimean Open Championship. Such step placed the league inside the Russian football league system.

== Status ==
The league was formed by UEFA delegation that is led by former president of the Slovak Football Association František Laurinec. Five teams have never participated at professional level and according to the official UEFA evaluation the region has a poor football infrastructure. According to Laurinec "UEFA wants to help save football in Crimea." Ukrainian officials do not seem to be strongly against the separate league in Crimea, but do remain firm in their stance that Crimea is part of Ukraine. In 2016 Vyacheslav Koloskov expressed his opinion that UEFA is not considering to grant Crimea a membership. The president of the Crimean Football Union responded to Koloskov by saying that UEFA has two ways of solving the issue, either recognize Crimea as part of the Russian Federation or grant a membership like in case with Kosovo. There was an opinion that the Crimean football union can become an independent member of UEFA just like the Gibraltar Football Association.

Just like its funding, most of the league's players come from the Russian mainland, although it does field some local players. A couple of Brazilian and Ukrainian players who chose to play in the league are under a risk of personal sanctions from the Ukrainian Association of Football. In its third season attendance of the Crimean Premier League varied from about 3,500 spectators at one match to 300 at others. A promotion/relegation game on 7 June 2018 where entrance was free gathered no more than 400 spectators. President of FC Avangard Yalta Igor Kashpirko acknowledged that some players, besides playing football, work elsewhere.

== History ==
The first competitive match was a 2–2 draw between SKChF Sevastopol and TSK-Tavria Simferopol in August 2015. TSK and SKCHF are relatively independent financially, while the rest six clubs in Crimea are financed by the Ministry of Sport of Russian Federation, according to a local journalist. There also were intentions to invite former Russian international football player Andrei Kanchelskis to coach one of the clubs in Crimea.

== Member clubs ==
Club	City/Town	Official website	Years	Former names	Status
Bakhchisaray	Bakhchysarai	fc-bakhchisaray.ru	2015–2017		Dissolved, merged with KFU Simferopol
Berkut	Armiansk	pfcberkut.ru	2015–2016	Ahrokapital Suvorovske	Dissolved (former Ukrainian amateur club)
Favorite-VD-Kafa	Feodosia	kafagoleador.ucoz.net	2015–2018, 2019-2021	Kafa Feodosia	Relegated in 2018, Promoted in 2019, merged with Aluston Alushta
Rubin	Yalta	rubinyalta.ru	2015–2018		Admitted to the Russian Second League in 2023
Ocean	Kerch	oceanfc.ru	Since 2015		(former Ukrainian professional club)
Sevastopol	Sevastopol	fcsevastopol.ru	Since 2015	SKChF Sevastopol	Admitted to the Russian Second League in 2023
TSK Simferopol	Simferopol	fctsk.ru	Since 2015		
Yevpatoriya	Yevpatoria	fcevpatoriya.ru (Note: Archived 13 March 2016 at the Wayback Machine)	Since 2015		
Krymteplitsa	Molodizhne	fc-kt.ru	Since 2016		Reorganized into Sparta-KT in 2021 (former Ukrainian professional club)
Kyzyltash	Bakhchysarai	kzt.com.ru	Since 2017	originally based in Yalta	Promoted in 2017, originally as a futsal club
Gvardeyets	Gvardeyskoye		Since 2018		Promoted in 2018 (former Ukrainian amateur club)
Inkomsport	Yalta		2018-2019		Promoted in 2018, relegated in 2019
Alushta	Alushta		2015		Promoted in 2019, reorganized in 2024 as Alushta-KFU
Chernomorets	Sevastopol		2012		Promoted in 2023 (former Ukrainian professional club)

== Champions ==
Season	Winner	Runner-up	Third place	Teams	Ref
2015 (promo)	SKChF Sevastopol	Gvardeets Gvardeyskoe	N/A	20	
2015–16	TSK-Tavria Simferopol	SKChF Sevastopol	Bakhchisaray	8	
2016–17	Sevastopol	Krymteplitsa Molodizhne	Yevpatoriya	8	
2017–18	Yevpatoriya	Sevastopol	TSK-Tavria Simferopol	8	
2018–19	Sevastopol	TSK-Tavria Simferopol	Krymteplitsa Molodizhne	8	
2019–20	Yevpatoriya	Krymteplitsa Molodizhne	Sevastopol	8	
2020–21	Sevastopol	Gvardeets Gvardeyskoe	Yevpatoriya	8	
2021–22	TSK-Tavria Simferopol	Sevastopol	Aluston-YUBK Alushta	8	
2022	Sevastopol	Rubin Yalta	Ocean Kerch	8	
2023	Tavria Simferopol	FC Kyzyltash	Ocean Kerch	8	
2024	Tavria Simferopol	Sparta-KT	FC Kyzyltash	8	
2025	FC Kyzyltash	Tavria Simferopol	Zarechnoye	8	

== See also ==
- Republican Football Federation of Crimea
- Football in Crimea
- Crimea national football team
- Crimean Tatars national football team
