= 1984 Soviet Second League, Zone 6 =

Football Championship of Ukrainian SSR
- Season: 1984
- Champions: Nyva Vinnytsia
- Promoted: none (after playoffs)
- Relegated: Dnipro Cherkasy
- Top goalscorer: 22 - Viktor Nastashevsky (SKA K.)

1984 Football Championship of Ukrainian SSR was the 54th season of association football competition of the Ukrainian SSR, which was part of the Soviet Second League in Zone 6. The season started on 31 March 1984.

The 1984 Football Championship of Ukrainian SSR was won by FC Nyva Vinnytsia. Qualified for the interzonal playoffs, the team from Vinnytsia Oblast did not manage to gain promotion by placing second in its group.

The "Ruby Cup" of Molod Ukrayiny newspaper (for the most scored goals) was received by SKA Odessa.

== Format ==
The season consisted of two stages preliminary and final tournaments. During the preliminary tournament participants were split into two groups of 13 teams in each with the six best of each group qualifying for the championship group of the next stage and the seven worst played a consolation tournament.

In the final stage of both championship and consolation tournaments teams played home and away only with teams of another group. The winner of championship tournament further participated in the Soviet Second League interzonal playoffs in an effort to gain promotion to the First League, while the worst team of consolation tournament relegated to amateurs.

== Teams ==
=== Promoted teams ===
- Dynamo Irpin – Champion of the Fitness clubs competitions (KFK) (debut)

== Preliminary stage ==
=== Group 1 ===
==== Location map ====
Locations of teams in Lower Second League, Zone 1

==== Final standings ====
Pos	Team	Pld	W	D	L	GF	GA	GD	Pts	Qualification
1	Nyva Vinnytsia	24	13	9	2	42	13	+29	35	Qualified for the championship tournament
2	Prykarpattia Ivano-Frankivsk	24	11	6	7	23	23	0	28	Qualified for the championship tournament
3	SKA Kiev	24	10	8	6	38	22	+16	28	Qualified for the championship tournament
4	Zakarpattia Uzhhorod	24	9	10	5	32	27	+5	28	Qualified for the championship tournament
5	Avanhard Rivne	24	9	10	5	22	21	+1	28	Qualified for the championship tournament
6	Torpedo Lutsk	24	11	5	8	20	20	0	27	Qualified for the championship tournament
7	Bukovyna Chernivtsi	24	10	7	7	28	19	+9	27	
8	Nyva Berezhany	24	11	4	9	30	21	+9	26	
9	Spartak Zhytomyr	24	10	6	8	32	29	+3	26	
10	Podillia Khmelnytskyi	24	7	3	14	28	39	−11	17	
11	Desna Chernihiv	24	6	5	13	24	39	−15	17	
12	Dynamo Irpin	24	4	8	12	20	39	−19	16	
13	Dnipro Cherkasy	24	1	7	16	7	34	−27	9	

=== Group 2 ===
==== Location map ====
Locations of teams in Lower Second League, Zone 1

==== Final standings ====
Pos	Team	Pld	W	D	L	GF	GA	GD	Pts	Qualification
1	Sudnobudivnyk Mykolaiv	24	14	6	4	33	15	+18	34	Qualified for the championship tournament
2	Kryvbas Kryvyi Rih	24	12	8	4	33	22	+11	32	Qualified for the championship tournament
3	Kolos Mezhyrich	24	13	5	6	35	23	+12	31	Qualified for the championship tournament
4	SKA Odessa	24	13	5	6	42	24	+18	31	Qualified for the championship tournament
5	Krystal Kherson	24	11	6	7	34	33	+1	28	Qualified for the championship tournament
6	Novator Zhdanov	24	9	7	8	19	17	+2	25	Qualified for the championship tournament
7	Shakhtar Horlivka	24	9	5	10	27	25	+2	23	
8	Zirka Kirovohrad	24	8	7	9	31	29	+2	23	
9	Mayak Kharkiv	24	8	5	11	22	26	−4	21	
10	Atlantyka Sevastopol	24	6	9	9	23	26	−3	21	
11	Metalurh Dniprodzerzhynsk	24	4	7	13	23	38	−15	15	
12	Stakhonovets Stakhanov	24	4	7	13	21	39	−18	15	
13	Okean Kerch	24	3	7	14	18	44	−26	13	

== Final stage ==
=== Championship tournament ===
==== Final standings ====
Pos	Team	Pld	W	D	L	GF	GA	GD	Pts	Qualification
1	Nyva Vinnytsia(C) (Q)	36	21	10	5	58	18	+40	52	Qualified for interzonal competitions among other Zone winners
2	Kolos Mezhyrich	36	23	5	8	60	34	+26	51	
3	Sudnobudivnyk Mykolaiv	36	20	9	7	51	22	+29	49	
4	SKA Odesa	36	19	7	10	65	37	+28	45	
5	Zakarpattia Uzhhorod	36	14	13	9	49	41	+8	41	
6	Kryvbas Kryvyi Rih	36	14	13	9	44	42	+2	41	
7	Krystal Kherson	36	16	8	12	45	47	−2	40	
8	SKA Kyiv	36	13	12	11	56	48	+8	38	
9	Prykarpattia Ivano-Frankivsk	36	14	8	14	31	36	−5	36	
10	Avanhard Rivne	36	12	12	12	23	43	−20	36	
11	Torpedo Lutsk	36	13	9	14	31	40	−9	35	
12	Novator Zhdanov	36	12	11	13	31	32	−1	35	

=== Consolation tournament ===
==== Final standings ====
Pos	Team	Pld	W	D	L	GF	GA	GD	Pts	Relegation
13	Nyva Berezhany	38	17	10	11	52	32	+20	44	
14	Bukovyna Chernivtsi	38	15	10	13	45	36	+9	40	
15	Shakhtar Horlivka	38	15	10	13	48	41	+7	40	
16	Spartak Zhytomyr	38	14	11	13	50	48	+2	39	
17	Mayak Kharkiv	38	14	10	14	39	35	+4	38	
18	Zirka Kirovohrad	38	13	11	14	54	49	+5	37	
19	Podillya Khmelnytskyi	38	13	6	19	52	57	−5	32	
20	Desna Chernihiv	38	12	8	18	44	63	−19	32	
21	Dynamo Irpin	38	9	13	16	40	59	−19	31	
22	Atlantyka Sevastopol	38	9	13	16	39	49	−10	31	
23	Stakhanovets Stakhanov	38	10	9	19	37	56	−19	29	
24	Metalurh Dniprodzerzhynsk	38	9	11	18	40	57	−17	29	
25	Okean Kerch	38	9	10	19	38	65	−27	28	
26	Dnipro Cherkasy (R)	38	3	9	26	11	55	−44	15	Relegated

Source: football.lg.ua
(R) Relegated

== Top goalscorers ==
The following were the top ten goalscorers.

#	Scorer	Goals (Pen.)	Team
1	Viktor Nastashevsky	22	SKA Kiev
2	Fedir Vasylchenko	20	Shakhtar Horlivka
3	Mykola Kudrytsky	18	Kryvbas Kryvyi Rih
3	Petro Priadun	18	Nyva Berezhany
3	Ihor Yavorskyi	18	Kolos Mezhyrich
6	Yuriy Zuikov	17	Okean Kerch
7	Volodymyr Shyshkov	15	Spartak Zhytomyr
8	Serhiy Shevchenko	14	Nyva Vinnytsia
8	Oleksandr Novikov	14	Kolos Mezhyrich
8	Yuriy Smahin	14	Sudnobudivnyk Mykolaiv
8	Vasyl Martynenko	14	Zakarpattia Uzhhorod
8	Hennadiy Horshkov	14	Desna Chernihiv

== See also ==
- Soviet Second League
