= 1979 Soviet Second League =

Second League
- Season: 1979

1979 Soviet Second League was a Soviet competition in the Soviet Second League.

== Qualifying groups ==
=== Group I [Northwest and Central] ===
Pos	Rep	Team	Pld	W	D	L	GF	GA	GD	Pts	Promotion
1	RUS	Iskra Smolensk	46	30	13	3	86	26	+60	73	Promoted
2	RUS	Textilshchik Ivanovo	46	25	12	9	69	38	+31	62	
3	BLR	Dinamo Brest	46	24	14	8	77	35	+42	62	
4	RUS	Dinamo Vologda	46	22	16	8	55	38	+17	60	
5	LVA	Daugava Riga	46	26	7	13	97	47	+50	59	
6	RUS	Spartak Kostroma	46	25	9	12	61	36	+25	59	
7	BLR	Khimik Grodno	46	22	13	11	56	33	+23	57	
8	LTU	Atlantas Klaipeda	46	21	14	11	58	39	+19	56	
9	RUS	Saturn Rybinsk	46	21	11	14	62	46	+16	53	
10	RUS	Volga Kalinin	46	20	12	14	55	39	+16	52	
11	RUS	Moskvich Moskva	46	18	16	12	52	41	+11	52	
12	BLR	Dvina Vitebsk	46	15	21	10	49	38	+11	51	
13	RUS	Lokomotiv Kaluga	46	18	14	14	55	37	+18	50	
14	RUS	Dinamo Bryansk	46	21	6	19	60	56	+4	48	
15	LVA	Zvejnieks Liepaja	46	14	16	16	46	55	−9	44	
16	RUS	Sever Murmansk	46	13	13	20	47	68	−21	39	
17	BLR	Dnepr Mogilyov	46	12	13	21	41	62	−21	37	
18	RUS	Krasnaya Presnya Moskva	46	11	12	23	34	67	−33	34	
19	RUS	Mashinostroitel Tula	46	8	18	20	40	72	−32	34	
20	RUS	Volzhanin Kineshma	46	9	11	26	41	71	−30	29	
21	BLR	GomSelMash Gomel	46	7	14	25	34	71	−37	28	
22	RUS	Baltika Kaliningrad	46	8	11	27	34	71	−37	27	
23	RUS	FSM Moskva	46	7	8	31	41	80	−39	22	
24	RUS	Stroitel Cherepovets	46	3	10	33	20	104	−84	16	

=== Group II [Ukraine] ===
Pos	Team	Pld	W	D	L	GF	GA	GD	Pts	Promotion or relegation
1	Kolos Nikopol (C, P)	46	28	12	6	68	32	+36	68	Promoted
2	SKA Kiev	46	26	12	8	65	32	+33	64	
3	SKA Lviv	46	25	11	10	67	33	+34	61	
4	Avanhard Rivne	46	23	14	9	76	41	+35	60	
5	Bukovyna Chernivtsi	46	24	10	12	55	32	+23	58	
6	Spartak Zhytomyr	46	22	12	12	57	41	+16	56	
7	Krystal Kherson	46	21	10	15	63	45	+18	52	
8	Kryvbas Kryvyi Rih	46	18	16	12	62	47	+15	52	
9	Zirka Kirovohrad	46	20	10	16	44	40	+4	50	
10	Sudnobudivnyk Mykolaiv	46	18	13	15	48	47	+1	49	
11	Kolos Poltava	46	18	9	19	48	52	−4	45	
12	Atlantyka Sevastopol	46	17	9	20	54	62	−8	43	
13	Podillia Khmelnytskyi	46	17	8	21	44	57	−13	42	
14	Dnipro Cherkasy	46	14	13	19	38	49	−11	41	
15	Novator Zhdanov	46	17	6	23	47	54	−7	40	
16	Hoverla Uzhhorod	46	10	19	17	36	46	−10	39	
17	Desna Chernihiv	46	13	12	21	37	57	−20	38	
18	Okean Kerch	46	12	14	20	36	52	−16	38	
19	Frunzenets Sumy	46	13	10	23	47	62	−15	36	
20	Torpedo Lutsk	46	10	16	20	42	69	−27	36	
21	Nyva Vinnytsia	46	11	13	22	36	44	−8	35	
22	Avtomobilist Tiraspol	46	11	13	22	28	47	−19	35	Moldavian SSR
23	Metalurh Dniprodzerzhynsk	46	13	8	25	37	71	−34	34	
24	Shakhtar Horlivka	46	11	10	25	53	76	−23	32	Avoided relegation

(C) Champions; (P) Promoted

=== Group III [Volga–Russian South] ===
Pos	Team	Pld	W	D	L	GF	GA	GD	Pts	Promotion
1	Dinamo Stavropol	48	37	4	7	91	31	+60	78	Promoted
2	Rotor Volgograd	48	29	8	11	102	36	+66	66	
3	Metallurg Lipetsk (Note: Novolipetsk Lipetsk changed name to Metallurg.)	48	28	10	10	75	40	+35	66	
4	Mashuk Pyatigorsk	48	25	8	15	67	46	+21	58	
5	Spartak Oryol	48	24	9	15	82	63	+19	57	
6	Sokol Saratov	48	23	11	14	71	49	+22	57	
7	Volga Gorkiy	48	24	8	16	62	51	+11	56	
8	RostSelMash Rostov-na-Donu	48	24	8	16	92	63	+29	56	
9	Torpedo Taganrog	48	23	9	16	69	50	+19	55	
10	Dinamo Makhachkala	48	23	9	16	75	53	+22	55	
11	Znamya Truda Orekhovo-Zuyevo	48	24	6	18	68	51	+17	54	
12	Khimik Dzerzhinsk	48	21	9	18	59	52	+7	51	
13	Druzhba Maykop	48	20	9	19	56	54	+2	49	
14	Torpedo Vladimir	48	19	11	18	66	59	+7	49	
15	Uralan Elista	48	20	8	20	63	64	−1	48	
16	Spartak Ryazan	48	18	9	21	46	47	−1	45	
17	Salyut Belgorod	48	17	7	24	67	76	−9	41	
18	Stal Cheboksary	48	16	8	24	50	67	−17	40	
19	Revtrud Tambov	48	16	7	25	51	69	−18	39	
20	Cement Novorossiysk	48	12	13	23	37	65	−28	37	
21	Volgar Astrakhan	48	14	8	26	58	84	−26	36	
22	Trud Volzhskiy	48	12	9	27	52	80	−28	33	
23	Avangard Kursk	48	13	6	29	46	87	−41	32	
24	Khimik Novomoskovsk	48	11	9	28	43	87	−44	31	
25	Turbina Syzran	48	4	3	41	32	156	−124	11	

=== Group IV [Caucasus and Ural] ===
Pos	Rep	Team	Pld	W	D	L	GF	GA	GD	Pts	Promotion
1	GEO	Guria Lanchkhuti	46	31	4	11	110	50	+60	66	Promoted
2	GEO	Lokomotiv Samtredia	46	28	9	9	109	49	+60	65	
3	AZE	Karabakh Stepanakert	46	29	5	12	65	38	+27	63	
4	RUS	Zenit Izhevsk	46	23	13	10	70	42	+28	59	
5	ARM	Kotaik Abovyan	46	26	6	14	83	43	+40	58	
6	AZE	Araz Nahichevan	46	27	3	16	88	78	+10	57	
7	GEO	Dinamo Zugdidi	46	21	10	15	53	45	+8	52	
8	GEO	Dinamo Sukhumi	46	18	16	12	49	39	+10	52	
9	GEO	Dila Gori	46	21	8	17	74	65	+9	50	
10	GEO	Kolkheti Poti	46	22	5	19	72	55	+17	49	
11	ARM	Shirak Leninakan	46	20	7	19	56	48	+8	47	
12	RUS	Gazovik Orenburg	46	19	9	18	58	66	−8	47	
13	RUS	Gastello Ufa	46	17	10	19	42	47	−5	44	
14	AZE	Hazar Lenkoran	46	19	5	22	54	72	−18	43	
15	GEO	Dinamo Batumi	46	19	5	22	53	65	−12	43	
16	AZE	Avtomobilist Baku	46	17	9	20	54	63	−9	43	
17	RUS	Turbina Naberezhnyye Chelny	46	16	10	20	49	62	−13	42	
18	RUS	Uralets Nizhniy Tagil	46	13	10	23	45	60	−15	36	
19	RUS	Rubin Kazan	46	10	16	20	48	65	−17	36	
20	AZE	Progress Kirovabad	46	13	7	26	56	96	−40	33	
21	RUS	Dinamo Kirov	46	12	7	27	33	60	−27	31	
22	ARM	Arabkir Yerevan	46	10	11	25	55	101	−46	31	
23	RUS	Druzhba Yoshkar-Ola	46	12	5	29	43	73	−30	29	
24	RUS	Torpedo Togliatti	46	10	8	28	51	88	−37	28	

=== Group V [Central Asia and West Siberia] ===
Pos	Rep	Team	Pld	W	D	L	GF	GA	GD	Pts	Promotion
1	UZB	Buston Jizak	46	29	11	6	74	35	+39	69	Promoted
2	UZB	Shahrihanets Shahrihan	46	28	7	11	73	39	+34	63	
3	KAZ	Aktyubinets Aktyubinsk	46	24	8	14	79	44	+35	56	
4	UZB	Yangiyer	46	23	9	14	75	54	+21	55	
5	KAZ	Metallurg Chimkent	46	24	6	16	73	50	+23	54	
6	RUS	Stroitel Tyumen	46	22	9	15	59	39	+20	53	
7	UZB	Dinamo Samarkand	46	21	10	15	59	39	+20	52	
8	UZB	Neftyanik Fergana	46	19	11	16	72	50	+22	49	
9	KAZ	Meliorator Kzil-Orda (Note: Orbita Kzil-Orda changed name to Meliorator.)	46	20	8	18	52	60	−8	48	
10	UZB	Horezm Yangiaryk	46	19	8	19	66	72	−6	46	
11	RUS	Metallurg Magnitogorsk	46	17	12	17	51	59	−8	46	
12	UZB	Hiva	46	19	7	20	54	70	−16	45	
13	UZB	KarshiStroi Karshi	46	18	8	20	60	60	0	44	
14	UZB	Zarafshan Navoi	46	17	10	19	51	53	−2	44	
15	UZB	Pahtachi Gulistan	46	17	9	20	53	61	−8	43	
16	UZB	Avtomobilist Termez	46	18	6	22	57	63	−6	42	
17	UZB	Narimanovets Bagat	46	17	8	21	49	64	−15	42	
18	UZB	Amudarya Nukus	46	18	5	23	57	76	−19	41	
19	KAZ	Khimik Jambul	46	16	9	21	53	63	−10	41	
20	RUS	Signal Chelyabinsk	46	16	6	24	51	49	+2	38	
21	TJK	Hojent Leninabad	46	16	6	24	50	70	−20	38	
22	TJK	Pahtakor Kurgan-Tyube	46	15	6	25	46	71	−25	36	
23	UZB	Textilshchik Namangan	46	13	7	26	41	69	−28	33	
24	KAZ	Trud Shevchenko	46	7	12	27	53	98	−45	26	

=== Group VI (Kazakhstan and East Siberia) ===
Pos	Rep	Team	Pld	W	D	L	GF	GA	GD	Pts	Promotion
1	RUS	SKA Khabarovsk	40	25	9	6	84	37	+47	59	Promoted
2	KAZ	Shakhtyor Karaganda	40	25	8	7	64	31	+33	58	
3	RUS	Luch Vladivostok	40	22	8	10	69	38	+31	52	
4	RUS	Amur Blagoveshchensk	40	22	7	11	53	25	+28	51	
5	KAZ	Spartak Semipalatinsk	40	22	6	12	74	49	+25	50	
6	RUS	Torpedo Rubtsovsk	40	22	6	12	60	43	+17	50	
7	RUS	Dinamo Barnaul	40	19	12	9	65	43	+22	50	
8	RUS	Zvezda Irkutsk	40	20	8	12	73	54	+19	48	
9	KAZ	Tselinnik Tselinograd	40	19	10	11	77	43	+34	48	
10	RUS	Angara Angarsk	40	19	7	14	54	46	+8	45	
11	RUS	Avtomobilist Krasnoyarsk	40	17	8	15	54	47	+7	42	
12	RUS	Irtysh Omsk	40	17	6	17	49	52	−3	40	
13	RUS	Lokomotiv Ulan-Ude	40	16	7	17	50	52	−2	39	
14	RUS	Amur Komsomolsk-na-Amure	40	14	6	20	48	52	−4	34	
15	KAZ	Vostok Ust-Kamenogorsk	40	13	7	20	48	57	−9	33	
16	KAZ	Bulat Temirtau	40	13	6	21	41	66	−25	32	
17	RUS	Manometr Tomsk (Note: Torpedo Tomsk changed name to Manometr.)	40	12	8	20	37	55	−18	32	
18	KAZ	Ugolshchik Ekibastuz	40	9	6	25	31	63	−32	24	
19	RUS	Chkalovets Novosibirsk	40	7	10	23	35	70	−35	24	
20	KAZ	Avangard Petropavlovsk	40	5	7	28	23	83	−60	17	
21	KAZ	Torpedo Kokchetav	40	4	4	32	37	120	−83	12	

Source: rsssf.com
