= Fiolent Stadium =

Football stadium in Ukraine

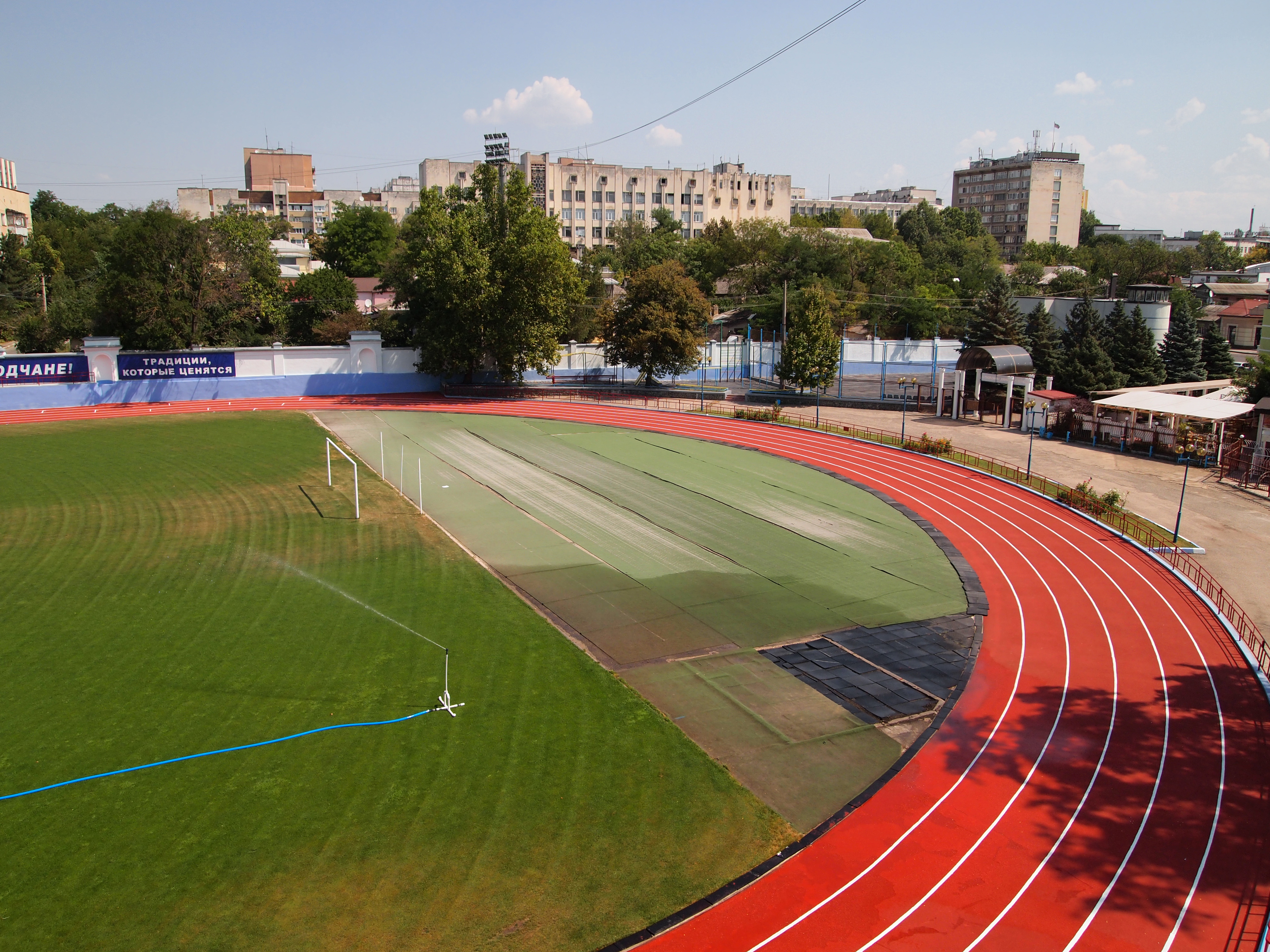
- Interactive map of Fiolent Stadium
- Former names: Meteor, Avant-garde, Kharchovyk, Synie pole
- Location: Simferopol, Crimea
- Coordinates: 44°57′39.41″N 34°6′17.48″E
- Owner: vacant
- Capacity: 3,739 (football)
- Surface: Grass
- Field size: 105m by 68m

Construction
- Opened: 1 April 1935

Tenants
- FC Ihroservice Simferopol; FC Zhemchuzhyna Yalta (temporary)

Fiolent, was the home ground of the now defunct Ukrainian football club of FC Ihroservice Simferopol. The ground opened for use on 1 April 1935. The former names it carried were Synie pole (Blue field), Kharchovyk (Food dealer), Avant-Garde, Meteor. It can hold 5,000 spectators. The size of the field is 105m x 68m.

Ukrainian Second League club Zhemchuzhyna Yalta moved their home games in the 2012–13 seasons from Round 16 onwards while their home ground was under pitch reconstruction.
