= FC Bucha =

Amateur football club from Bucha

- Full name: FC Bucha
- Founded: 1999
- Ground: Stadium Yuvileinyi
- Capacity: 1,028
- Chairman: Oleksiuk Pavlovych Vasyl
- Manager: Yevhen Karmalita

FC Bucha (Ukrainian: Футбольний Клуб Буча) is an amateur football club from Bucha and the regional competitions of Kyiv Oblast. The club participated in the 2012–13 Ukrainian Cup.

== Honours ==
Ukrainian Amateur Cup

- Winners (1): 2011
