= Bakhchisaray, Republic of Bashkortostan =

Bakhchisaray Бахчисарай
- Village
- Location within Bashkortostan Location within Russia
- Coordinates: 54°34′N 53°33′E
- Country: Russia
- Region: Bashkortostan
- District: Tuymazinsky District
- Time zone: UTC+5:00

Bakhchisaray (Russian: Бахчисарай; Bashkir: Баҡсаһарай, Baqsaharay) is a rural locality (a village) in Ilchimbetovsky Selsoviet, Tuymazinsky District, Bashkortostan, Russia. The population was 8 as of 2010. There is 1 street.

== Geography ==
Bakhchisaray is located 13 km southwest of Tuymazy (the district's administrative centre) by road. Maxyutovo is the nearest rural locality.
