= FC Aluston-YUBK Alushta =

Aluston-YUBK Alushta
- Full name: Futbol'nyy klub Aluston-YUBK Alushta
- Founded: 2015
- Ground: FGBU TCSPSKR "Krymskiy", Alushta
- League: Crimean Premier League
- 2020–21: 8th (spared of relegation)

FC Aluston-YUBK Alushta (Russian: ФК "Алустон-ЮБК" Алушта) is an association football team based in Alushta, Crimea.

It was founded in 2015 in Feodosia, where it remained until the 2020/21 season. Then the club moved to Alushta.

== Team names ==
- 2015–2018: FC Kafa Feodosia
- 2018–2021: FC Favorite-VD-Kafa Feodosia
- 2021–present: FC Aluston-YUBK Alushta

== League and cup history (Crimea) ==
Season	Div.	Pos.	Pl.	W	D	L	GS	GA	P	Domestic Cup	Europe	Notes
2015	1st All-Crimean Championship Gr. A	4_{/10}	9	5	0	4	15	14	15			Reorganization of competitions
2015–16	1st Premier League	6_{/8}	28	9	6	13	31	45	33	Group stage		
2016–17	1st Premier League	6_{/8}	28	7	8	13	46	49	29	1/2 finals		
2017–18	1st Premier League	7_{/8}	28	5	2	21	22	73	17	1/8 finals		1st–2nd league match (defeat, relegated)
2018–19	2nd Open Championship	1_{/17}	29	25	2	2	112	26	77			Promoted
2019–20	1st Premier League	7_{/8}	28	7	2	19	25	56	23	1/4 finals		1st–2nd league match (winner)
2020–21	1st Premier League	8_{/8}	28	3	2	23	25	95	11	1/4 finals		spared of relegation, because Krymteplytsia withdrawal from the league
2021–22	1st Premier League									1/4 finals		
