= FC Ihroservice Simferopol =

Ihroservice
- Full name: FC Ihroservice Simferopol; Футбольний клуб «ІгроСервіс» Сімферополь
- Founded: 1936
- Dissolved: 2009
- Ground: Fiolent Stadium
- Capacity: 5,000
- Chairman: V. H. Yanovskyi
- Head Coach: Serhiy Shevchenko
- League: Persha Liha
- 2008–09: 11th (Withdraw)
Home colours	Away colours

Logo of Dynamo-Ihro-Servis before 2007

FC Ihroservice Simferopol (Ukrainian: ФК ІгроСервіс, Crimean Tatar: FK İgroServis) was a Ukrainian football team based in Simferopol, Crimea, Ukraine. Uniform colours were white shirts and blue shorts.

== History ==
FC Ihroservis traces its heritage to FC Dynamo Simferopol (Динамо, part of the Dynamo sports society) that was created in 1936 and participated in the Soviet football competitions until the late 1950s when it was dissolved.

In 2000 the football expert Mikhail Sachko and the businessman Nikolai Pashkulsk decided to recreate Dynamo club in place of the already existing FC Pishchevyk (Kharchovyk) Simferopol. In July 2001 the new Dynamo Simferopol joined the professional ranks of the Ukrainian competitions in the Ukrainian Second League.

Ihroservis played in Fiolent Stadium that seats 5000. The club was recently renamed in 2007 from FC Dynamo-Ihroservice to FC Ihroservice. After the 2008–09 season the club failed to pay license fees for the next season and the PFL withdrew their professional status.

== Sponsors ==
IgroService (gambling equipment manufacturer), Lazurnyi Bereg (real-estate company), Blockpost (regional security company), and others.

== Honors ==
- Ukrainian Second League (3rd Tier)

2003/04 (Gr. B)

- Crimea championship (Soviet Lower Tier)

1939, 1940, 1947

== League and cup history (Ukraine) ==
Season	Div.	Pos.	Pl.	W	D	L	GS	GA	P	Domestic Cup	Europe	Notes
2001–02	3rd "B"	3	34	16	12	6	33	38	41	Did not enter		
2002–03	3rd "B"	2	30	18	7	5	53	27	61	1/32 finals		
2003–04	3rd "B"	1	30	24	3	3	60	24	75	1/32 finals		Promoted
2004–05	2nd	14	34	12	5	17	38	57	41	1/16 finals		
2005–06	2nd	13	34	10	8	16	40	51	38	1/32 finals		
2006–07	2nd	10	36	14	9	13	46	44	51	1/16 finals		
2007–08	2nd	6	38	18	6	14	50	45	60	1/8 finals		
2008–09	2nd	11	32	12	6	14	42	47	42	1/16 finals		Withdraw

== Managers ==
- 2000–2001 Mykhailo Sachko
- 2001–2002 Serhiy Katalimov
- 2002–2005 Mykhailo Sachko
- 2005 Serhiy Lezhentsev
- 2005–2007 Oleh Lutkov
- 2007 Rostyslav Lysenko
- 2007–2009 Serhiy Shevchenko
