= Crimean Tatars national football team =

Crimean Tatars
- Association: Crimean Tatar Football Union (Крымскотатарский футбольный союз)
- Head coach: Elvin Kadyrov
| First colours | Second colours |

First international
- Crimean Tatars 0–5 Northern Cyprus (Morphou, Cyprus; 19 November 2006)

Biggest win
- Crimean Tatars 3–0 Thracian Greeks (Turkey) (San Martin de Tor, Italy; 19 June 2016)

Biggest defeat
- Ladinia 8–0 Crimean Tatars (Pfalzen, Italy; 21 June 2016)

The Crimean Tatars national football team is a football team representing Crimean Tatars in international tournaments. The team is governed by the Crimean Tatar Football Union. It is not associated with the Ukrainian Association of Football, but it is supported by the Mejlis of the Crimean Tatar People, which in the Russian Federation is listed as an extremist organization.

== History ==
The national team was formed in 2006 based on a university team of the Crimean Engineer and Pedagogical University and associated with revival and development of Crimean Tatars identity following dissolution of the Soviet Union and return of Crimean Tatars to Crimea.

In 2006, the newly established team entered the ELF Cup tournament, organized by the Cyprus Turkish Football Association, a member of the N.F.-Board. The team played 5 matches in the tournament, knocking out Kyrgyzstan (a FIFA member) in the semifinals with overtime, and reached the finals, losing to the hosts with a score of 1–3. The team was led by Rustem Osmanov.

In 2016, the team went to the football tournament Europeada, a tournament for European indigenous and national minorities. The team was declared under the name "Adalet" and consisted of athletes from Crimea, Lviv, Kyiv and several other Ukrainian cities. She won the opening match of the group stage against West Thracian Muslims 3–0, but then lost to the Romanian Hungarians and Ladinia with a score of 1–6 and 0–8 respectively and completed the performance. The following players with playing coaches Elvin Kadyrov and Elnur Amietov :

- Shevekt Dzhaparov, Ennan Ashirov, Timur Kanataev, Arsen Yakubov, Lenzi Ablitarov, Esat Alimov, Diliaver Osmanov, Elzar Ablyamitov, Ibrahim Aliyev, Fikret Alimov, Rustem Ablyaev, Arthur Temirov, Talat Bilyalov, Islyam Useynov.

The team is not associated with the Crimea national football team, which was created in 2017 on the territory of the Republic of Crimea and Sevastopol, which is governed by the Crimean Football Union.

== Honours ==
=== Non-FIFA competitions ===
- ELF Cup
  - Runners-up (1): 2006

== See also ==
- Crimean Premier League
- Football in Crimea
- Crimea national football team
