= 2011 Ukrainian Amateur Cup =

2011 Ukrainian Cup among amateurs
Tournament details
- Country: Ukraine
- Dates: 16 August – 12 November 2011
- Teams: 22

Final positions
- Champions: FC Bucha
- Runners-up: Hvadiyets Hvardiyske

The 2011 Ukrainian Amateur Cup was the sixteenth annual season of Ukraine's football knockout competition for amateur football teams. The competition started on 16 August 2011 and concluded on 12 November 2011.

The cup holders SC Beregvidek Berehove did not enter.

== Participated clubs ==
In bold are clubs that were active at the same season AAFU championship (parallel round-robin competition).

- AR Crimea (2): Ahrokapital Suvorovske, Hvardiyets Hvardiyske
- Cherkasy Oblast: Umanfermash Uman
- Chernihiv Oblast: **Yednist-2 Plysky**
- Donetsk Oblast: Slovkhlib Sloviansk
- Ivano-Frankivsk Oblast: Teplovyk Ivano-Frankivsk
- Kharkiv Oblast (2): **Lokomotyv Kupyansk**, Nika Kharkiv
- Kherson Oblast (2): Kolos Khlibodarivka, Tavriya Novotroitske
- Khmelnytskyi Oblast: **Zbruch Volochysk**
- Kirovohrad Oblast: **Olimpik Kirovohrad**
- Kyiv Oblast (2): Bucha, Zenit Boyarka
- Lviv Oblast: **Sambir**
- Luhansk Oblast: **Popasna**
- Mykolaiv Oblast: Teplovyk Yuznoukrayinsk
- Odesa Oblast: Sovinyon Tairove
- Poltava Oblast: **Nove Zhyttia Andriivka**
- Rivne Oblast: **ODEK Orzhiv**
- Zhytomyr Oblast (2): Lehion Zhytomyr, Zviahel-750 Novohrad-Volynskyi

== Bracket ==
The following is the bracket that demonstrates the last four rounds of the Ukrainian Cup, including the final match. Numbers in parentheses next to the match score represent the results of a penalty shoot-out.

Round of 16
Zvyahel-750 Novohrad-Volynsky	0	0	0
**FC Sambir**	**2**	**8**	**10**
**ODEK Orzhiv**	**2**	3	**5**
Teplovyk Ivano-Frankivsk	0	3	3
Zenit Boyarka	1	0	1
**Yednist-2 Plysky**	**7**	**10**	**17**
Umanfermmash Uman	1	0	1
**FC Bucha**	1	**6**	**7**
**Lokomotyv Kupyansk**	+
Slovkhlib Sloviansk	-
**Nove Zhyttia Andriyivka**	**3**	3	**6**
FC Popasna	0	3	3
Tavriya Novotroyitske	1	0	1
**Hvardiyets Hvardiyske**	**4**	**3**	**7**
Teplovyk Yuzhnoukrayinsk	1	0	1
**Kolos Khlibodarivka**	**2**	**5**	**7**

Quarter-finals
**FC Sambir**	**4**	1	**5**
ODEK Orzhiv	3	1	4
**FC Bucha**	**3**	1	**4**
Yednist-2 Plysky	0	**2**	2
**Nove Zhyttia Andriyivka**	+
Lokomotyv Kupyansk	-
Kolos Khlibodarivka	0	-	-
**Hvardiyets Hvardiyske**	**3**	+	+

Semi-finals
FC Sambir	0	0	0
**FC Bucha**	**1**	**1**	**2**
Nove Zhyttia Andriyivka	0	0	0
**Hvardiyets Hvardiyske**	0	**1**	**1**

Final
Hvardiyets Hvardiyske	1	1	2
**FC Bucha**	**3**	**4**	**7**

== Competition schedule ==
=== First qualification round ===
Team 1	Agg.	Team 2	1st leg	2nd leg
Olimpik Kirovohrad	2 – 3	**Umanfermmash Uman**	1–1	1–2
Nika Kharkiv	1 – 6	**Popasna**	0–0	1–6
Zbruch Volochysk	0 – 3	**Teplovyk Ivano-Frankivsk**	0–0	0–3
**Bucha**	4 – 2	Lehion Zhytomyr	4–0	0–2
Savinyon Tayirove	1 – 1 (3–4 p)	**Hvardiyets Hvardiyske**	1–0	0–1
**Kolos Khlibodarivka**	3 – 1	Ahrokapital Suvorovske	1–0	2–1

=== Second qualification round ===
Team 1	Agg.	Team 2	1st leg	2nd leg
**Lokomotyv Kupyansk**	w / o	Slovkhlib Sloviansk		
Zenit Boyarka	1 – 17	**Yednist-2 Plysky**	1–7	0–10
**Nove Zhyttia Andriyivka**	6 – 3	Popasna	3–0	3–3
Zvyahel-750 Novohrad-Volynsky	0 – 10	**Sambir**	0–2	0–8
**ODEK Orzhiv**	5 – 3	Teplovyk Ivano-Frankivsk	2–0	3–3
Umanfermmash Uman	1 – 7	**Bucha**	1–1	0–6
Tavriya Novotroyitske	1 – 7	**Hvardiyets Hvardiyske**	1–4	0–3
Teplovyk Yuzhnoukrayinsk	1 – 7	**Kolos Khlibodarivka**	1–2	0–5

=== Quarterfinals (1/4) ===
Team 1	Agg.	Team 2	1st leg	2nd leg
**Nove Zhyttia Andriyivka**	w / o	Lokomotyv Kupyansk		
**Bucha**	4 – 2	Yednist-2 Plysky	3–0	1–2
Kolos Khlibodarivka	w / o	**Hvardiyets Hvardiyske**	0–3	-/+
**Sambir**	5 – 4	ODEK Orzhiv	4–3	1–1

=== Semifinals (1/2) ===
Team 1	Agg.	Team 2	1st leg	2nd leg
Sambir	0 – 2	**Bucha**	0–1	0–1
Nove Zhyttia Andriyivka	0 – 1	**Hvardiyets Hvardiyske**	0–0	0–1

=== Final ===
Team 1	Agg.	Team 2	1st leg	2nd leg
Hvardiyets Hvardiyske	2 – 7	**Bucha**	1–3	1–4

Winner of the 2011 Ukrainian Football Cup among amateur teams
**FC Bucha (Kyiv Oblast)**; **1st time**

== See also ==
- 2011 Ukrainian Football Amateur League
- 2011–12 Ukrainian Cup
