= FC Yevpatoria =

Yevpatoria
- Full name: Futbol'nyy klub Yevpatoria
- Founded: 2015
- Ground: Arena Krym, Yevpatoria
- Capacity: 2.000
- League: Crimean Premier League
- 2020–21: 3rd
Home colours

FC Yevpatoria (Russian: ФК «Евпатория») is an association football team based in Yevpatoria, Crimea.

== Honours ==
- Crimean Premier League (1st Tier)

2017–18, 2019–20
2016–17, 2020–21

- CFU Cup (National Cup)

2016–17
2019–20, 2020–21

== League and cup history (Crimea) ==
Season	Div.	Pos.	Pl.	W	D	L	GS	GA	P	Domestic Cup	Europe	Notes
2015	1st All-Crimean Championship Gr. B	10_{/10}	9	0	0	9	8	43	0			Reorganization of competitions
2015–16	1st Premier League	4_{/8}	28	12	4	12	42	35	40	1/2 finals		
2016–17	1st Premier League	3_{/8}	28	15	3	10	64	36	48	Winner		
2017–18	1st Premier League	1_{/8}	28	21	4	3	72	19	67	1/2 finals		
2018–19	1st Premier League	5_{/8}	28	10	6	12	46	44	36	1/4 finals		
2019–20	1st Premier League	1_{/8}	28	21	4	3	54	23	67	Runners-up		
2020–21	1st Premier League	3_{/8}	28	14	2	12	48	33	44	Runners-up		
2021–22	1st Premier League											
