= FC Gvardeyets Skvortsovo =

Gvardeyets Skvortsovo
- Full name: Futbol'nyy klub Gvardeyets Skvortsovo
- Founded: 1945
- Ground: Sportiv'nyy tsentr "SKIF"
- League: Crimean Premier League
- 2020–21: 2nd
Home colours

FC Gvardeyets Skvortsovo (Russian: ФК «Гвардеец» Скворцово) is an association football team based in Skvortsovo, Crimea.

== Team names ==
- 1945–1954: FC Gvardeyets Gvardeyskoye
- 1954–2014: FC Hvardiyets Hvardiiske
- 2014–2020: FC Gvardeyets Gvardeyskoye
- 2020–present: FC Gvardeyets Skvortsovo

== Honours ==
- Ukrainian Amateur Cup

2011

- All-Crimean Championship (unofficial 1st Tier)

2015

- Crimean Premier League (1st Tier)

2020–21

- CFU Cup (National Cup)

2020–21
2018–19

== League and cup history ==
=== Ukraine ===
Season	Div.	Pos.	Pl.	W	D	L	GS	GA	P	Domestic Cup	Europe	Notes
2010	5th Crimean Championship	2_{/12}	22	17	2	3	60	17	53			
2011	5th Crimean Championship	1_{/13}	22	16	4	2	75	21	52			
2012	5th Crimean Championship	1_{/12}	22	18	1	3	85	15	51			
2013	5th Crimean Championship	1_{/11}	18	17	0	1	73	14	51			
2014	5th Crimean Championship	1_{/16}	24	21	1	2	99	12	64			Reorganization of competitions

=== Crimea ===
Season	Div.	Pos.	Pl.	W	D	L	GS	GA	P	Domestic Cup	Europe	Notes
2015	1st All-Crimean Championship Gr. B	1_{/10}	9	7	1	1	32	8	22			Final (defeat); reorganization of competitions
2015–16	2nd Open Championship	2_{/16}	24	18	4	2	76	12	58			1st–2nd league match (defeat)
2016–17	2nd Open Championship	1_{/13}	23	21	2	0	70	11	65	1/8 finals		Refusal of promotion
2017–18	2nd Open Championship	2_{/13}	24	21	1	2	60	21	59	1/8 finals		Promoted
2018–19	1st Premier League	8_{/8}	28	5	6	17	23	47	21	Runners-up		Relegated
2019–20	2nd Open Championship	1_{/12}	22	19	3	0	82	10	60	1/4 finals		Promoted
2020–21	1st Premier League	2_{/8}	28	14	5	9	47	36	47	Winner		
2021–22	1st Premier League											
