= FC Krymteplytsia Molodizhne =

Crimean football club

Krymteplytsia
- Full name: Futbol'nyy klub Krymteplytsia Molodizhne
- Nickname: Teplichniki (Greenhouse-keepers)
- Founded: 1999
- Dissolved: 2021
- Ground: KT Sport-Arena, Ahrarne
- Capacity: 3000
- Chairman: Aleksandr Vasilyev
- Head Coach: Artur Olenin
- League: Crimean Premier League
- 2020–21: 4th (withdrew, defunct)
Home colours

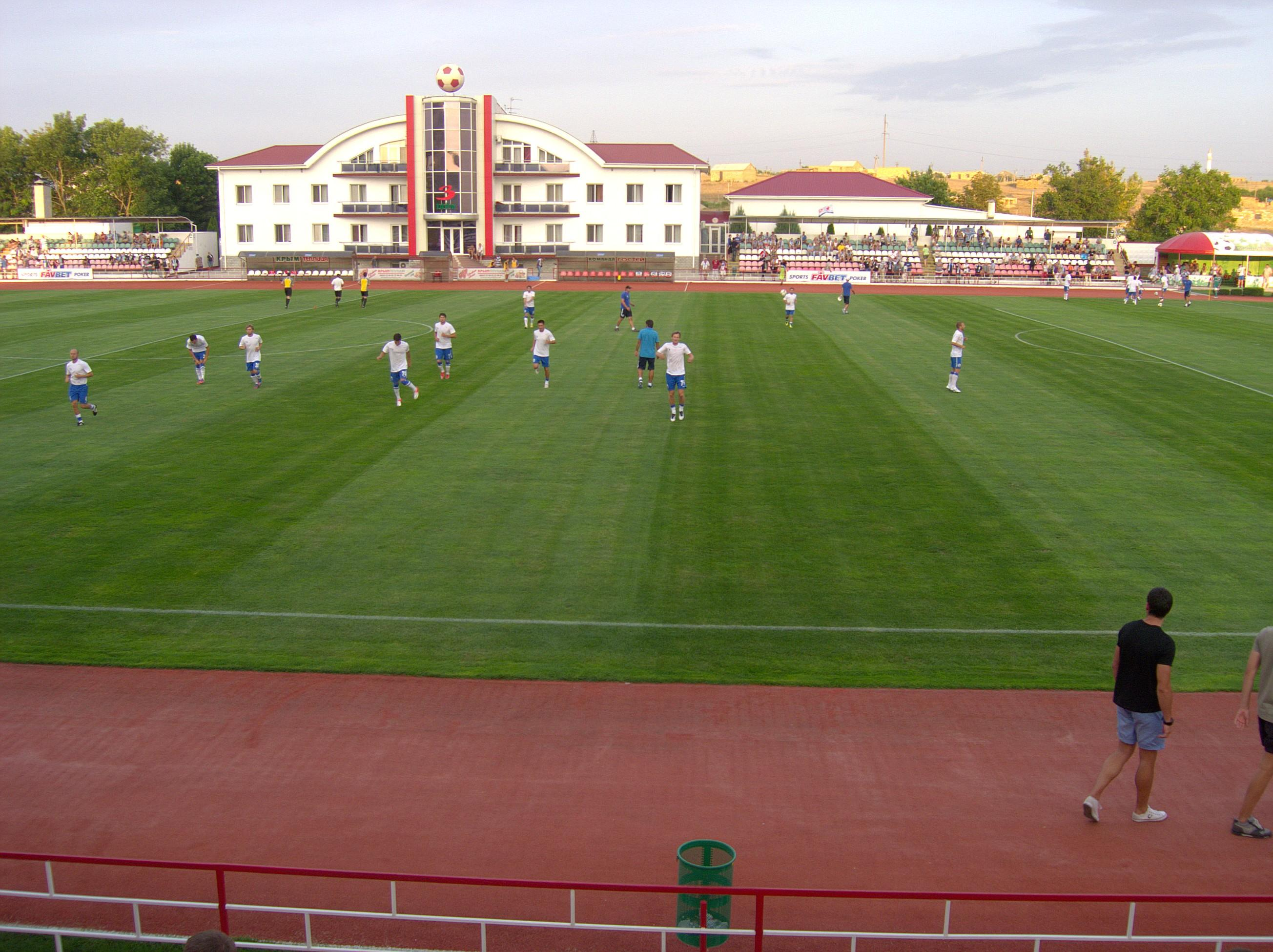
KT Sport-Arena in Ahrarne (in 2013)

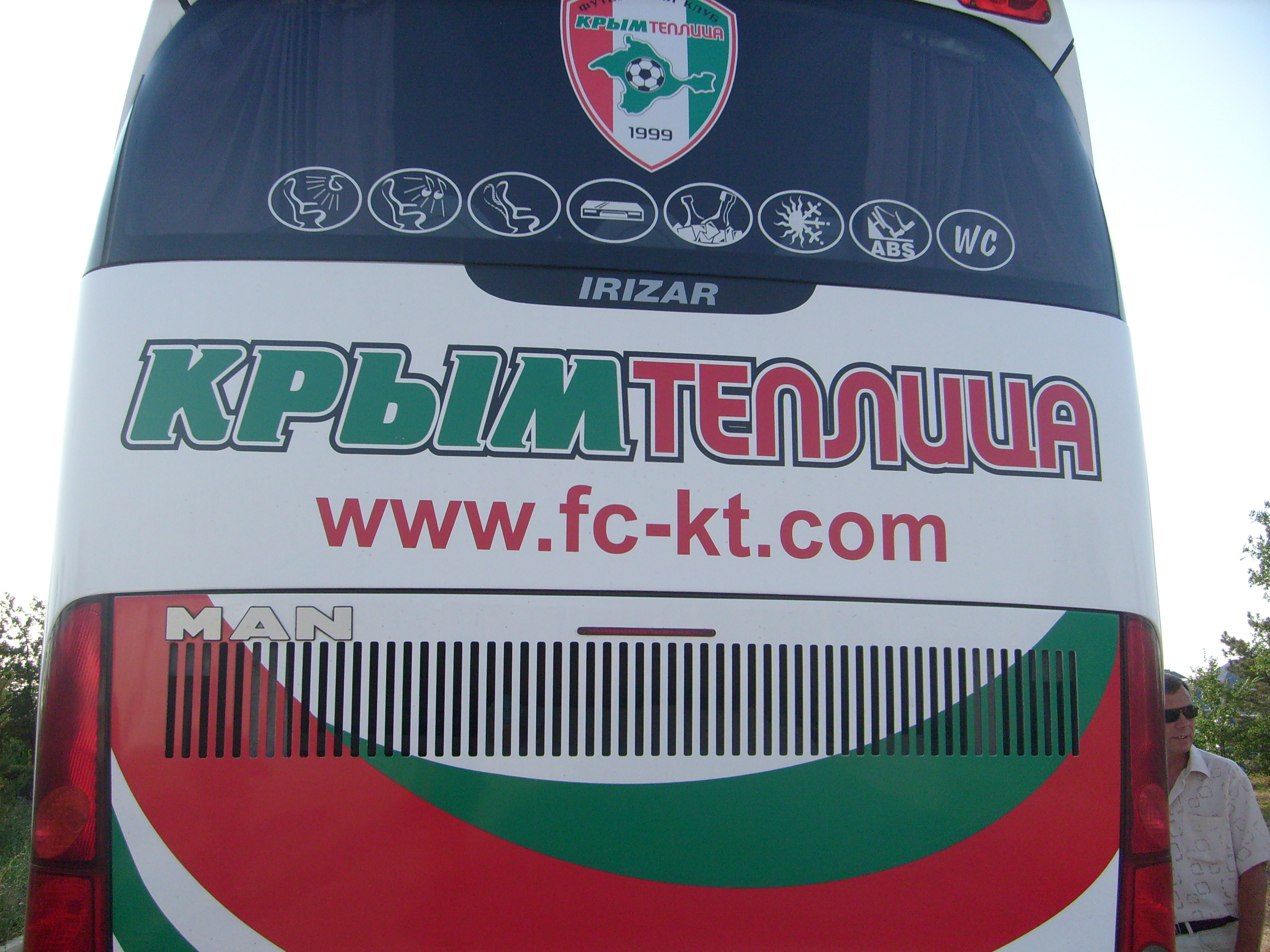
The club's bus in 2009

FC Krymteplytsia Molodizhne (Ukrainian: Футбольний клуб «Кримтеплиця» Молодіжне) was a football club based in an urbanized settlement (town) Molodizhne (north of Simferopol and adjacent to the city limits). The club's name means "Crimea greenhouse", as the club was founded by entrepreneur Alexander Vasiliev, general director of the agriculture company of the same name.

In 2021, it was reorganized as FC Spartak-KT Molodyozhnoye.

== History ==
The club played its home games in Simferopol in the town of Ahrarne, which is located within the Simferopol Municipality limits. In the championship of the Crimea, the club is represented by its second team, "Spartak Molodizhne".

In the 2006–07 season, they competed in the Ukrainian First League.

At the end of the 2012–13 Ukrainian First League season, the club's administration withdrew the club from the professional league. Since 2013 Krymteplytsia participates at the regional competitions only.

In 2016, it joined the Crimean Premier League.

The club withdrew from the league in 2021 due to funding issues.

Their main colours were red and white, due to chairman Vasiliev being an FC Spartak Moskva supporter, and green, from the company colours of Krymteplytsia.

Since 2022, the team has joined the Crimean Football Union and performed, in the Crimean National Championship under the new name Sparta-KT Molodizhne

== Honours ==
- Crimean Premier League (1st Crimean Tier)

2016–17, 2019–20
2018–19

- CFU Cup (National Cup)

2017–18, 2019–20
2016–17

- Ukrainian Second League (3rd Ukrainian Tier)

2004–05 (Gr. B)

- Crimea regional championship (Lower League Tier)

2002, 2015–16

== League and cup history ==
=== Ukraine ===
Season	Div.	Pos.	Pl.	W	D	L	GS	GA	P	Domestic Cup	Europe	Notes
2002	5th Crimean Championship	...								Amateur Cup		Admitted to Amateur League
2003	4th Amateur League Gr. E	2_{/5}	8	4	2	2	9	5	14			Admitted
2003–04	3rd Second League Gr. B	3_{/16}	30	16	8	6	46	31	56	1/32 finals		
2004–05	3rd Second League Gr. B	1_{/14}	26	20	5	1	51	17	65	1/32 finals		Promoted
2005–06	2nd First League	9_{/18}	34	12	11	11	35	34	47	1/16 finals		
2006–07	2nd First League	4_{/19}	36	21	7	8	53	37	70	1/8 finals		
2007–08	2nd First League	11_{/20}	38	13	11	14	49	43	50	1/32 finals		
2008–09	2nd First League	6_{/17}	32	14	7	11	40	39	49	1/16 finals		
2009–10	2nd First League	6_{/18}	34	17	8	9	53	28	59	1/8 finals		
2010–11	2nd First League	4_{/18}	34	18	7	9	43	30	61	1/16 finals		
2011–12	2nd First League	5_{/18}	34	17	9	8	50	38	60	1/32 finals		
2012–13	2nd First League	14_{/18}	34	9	8	17	30	45	35	1/16 finals		Withdrew
2014	5th Crimean Championship	5_{/16}	24	11	3	10	41	31	36			Reorganization of competitions

=== Russia ===
Season	Div.	Pos.	Pl.	W	D	L	GS	GA	P	Domestic Cup	Europe	Notes
2015	1st All-Crimean Championship Gr. A	9_{/10}	9	1	3	5	12	21	6			Reorganization of competitions
2015–16	2nd Open Championship	1_{/16}	24	21	1	2	111	17	64			Promoted
2016–17	1st Premier League	2_{/8}	28	17	6	5	59	28	57	Final		
2017–18	1st Premier League	4_{/8}	28	15	5	8	42	28	50	Cup		
2018–19	1st Premier League	3_{/8}	28	13	10	5	44	22	49	1/4 finals		
2019–20	1st Premier League	2_{/8}	28	16	6	6	53	25	54	Cup		
2020–21	1st Premier League	4_{/8}	28	12	2	12	47	39	44	1/4 finals		Withdrew

== Last squad ==
As of 5 March 2019, according to official website Archived 6 March 2019 at the Wayback Machine

Note: Flags indicate national team as defined under FIFA eligibility rules; some limited exceptions apply. Players may hold more than one non-FIFA nationality.

No.	Pos.	Nation	Player
1	GK	UKR	Vyacheslav Bazylevych
4	DF	RUS	Ivan Frolov
4	FW	RUS	Abdurashid Tokhirov
5	DF	RUS	Vladimir Pshenichnikov
9	MF	RUS	Maksym Prykhodnoy
10	MF	RUS	Lenur Akhunov
11	FW	RUS	Vladimir Sychevoy
12	GK	RUS	Ilya Isayev

No.	Pos.	Nation	Player
15	MF	RUS	Georgi Beryozov
16	FW	RUS	Nikita Prikhodnoy
20	MF	RUS	Grigori Gerasimov
21	MF	RUS	Yuri Maksimov
22	MF	RUS	Igor Dudov
25	DF	RUS	Rollan Pohoreltsev
29	MF	RUS	Ruslan Salakhutdinov
—	FW	UKR	Redvan Memeshev
—	DF	RUS	Yanis Linda

== Coaches ==
- ????-2017 Aleksei Khramtsov
- 2017– Artur Olenin
- 2018 Anton Monakhov
- 2018 Andriy Yudin
- 2019 Oleh Kolesov

== Spartak Molodizhne ==
The club has own reserve team Spartak Molodizhne (also as Spartak-KT Molodizhne). Spartak defunct in 2018.

The Spartak took part in 2009–10 Ukrainian League Cup where it was eliminated by FC Myr Hornostayivka in quarterfinals.

=== Honours ===
- Crimean regional championship (Ukrainian Lower League Tier)

2007, 2008, 2009

=== League and cup history ===
==== Ukraine ====
Season	Div.	Pos.	Pl.	W	D	L	GS	GA	P	Domestic Cup	Europe	Notes
2005	5th Crimean Championship	5_{/14}	26	15	6	5	60	25	51			as "Krymteplytsia-2"
2006	5th Crimean Championship	12_{/14}	26	7	2	17	33	81	23			as "Krymteplytsia-Khimik"
2007	5th Crimean Championship	1_{/13}	24	19	3	2	75	28	60			
2008	5th Crimean Championship	1_{/13}	22	19	2	1	87	20	59			
2009	5th Crimean Championship	1_{/12}	21	19	1	1	63	18	58			
2010	5th Crimean Championship	7_{/12}	22	10	3	9	32	34	33			
2011	5th Crimean Championship	8_{/13}	22	9	2	11	36	42	29			
...
2013	5th Crimean Championship	7_{/11}	10	5	1	4	15	15	16			
2014	5th Crimean Championship	5_{/16}	24	11	3	10	41	31	36			Reorganization of competitions

==== Russia ====
Season	Div.	Pos.	Pl.	W	D	L	GS	GA	P	Domestic Cup	Europe	Notes
2016–17	2nd Open Championship	5_{/13}	23	11	5	7	50	27	38			as "Krymteplytsia-2"
2017–18	2nd Open Championship	5_{/13}	24	11	5	8	43	33	38			as "Krymteplytsia-2"
2018–19	2nd Open Championship	7_{/17}	29	13	5	11	63	48	44			as "Krymteplytsia-2"; withdrew
