= FC Inkomsport Yalta =

Inkomsport Yalta
- Full name: Futbol'nyy klub Inkomsport Yalta
- Founded: 2015
- Dissolved: 2020
- League: Crimean Premier League
- 2019–20: 8th (relegated, defunct)

FC Inkomsport Yalta (Russian: ФК «Инкомспорт» Ялта) was a football team based in Yalta, Crimea.

== Team names ==
- 2015–2016: FC Asgard Yalta
- 2016–2017: SK Yalta
- 2017: MSK Yalta-Avangard
- 2017–2018: MSK Mriya-Avangard Yalta
- 2018: FC Inkomsport-Avangard Yalta
- 2018–2020: FC Inkomsport Yalta

== League and cup history (Crimea) ==
Season	Div.	Pos.	Pl.	W	D	L	GS	GA	P	Domestic Cup	Europe	Notes
2016–17	2nd Open Championship	4_{/13}	23	12	2	9	58	54	38	1/16 finals		
2017–18	2nd Open Championship	3_{/13}	24	16	4	4	69	34	52	1/8 finals		1st–2nd league match (winner, promoted)
2018–19	1st Premier League	7_{/8}	28	10	1	17	34	55	31	1/8 finals		1st–2nd league match (winner)
2019–20	1st Premier League	8_{/8}	28	5	6	17	38	65	21	1/2 finals		Relegated
