= FC TSK Simferopol =

Russian association football team

TSK Simferopol
- Full name: Футбольный Клуб Таврия Симферополь Крым Симферополь (Futbol'ny Klub Tavriya Simferopol' Krym Simferopol')
- Nickname: Krymchyany (Crimeans)
- Founded: 2014; 12 years ago
- Ground: Lokomotiv Republican Sports Complex
- Capacity: 19,978
- Chairman: Sergey Borodkin
- Manager: Vyacheslav Levchuk
- League: Crimean Premier League
- Website: http://www.fctsk.ru/
Home colours	Away colours

FC TSK Simferopol (Russian: ФК «ТСК» Симферополь) is a professional football team based in Simferopol, Crimea, that was created in place of Ukrainian SC Tavriya Simferopol, following the 2014 Russian annexation of Crimea.

TSK in the name stands for "Таврия Симферополь Крым" (Tavria – Simferopol – Crimea).

== History ==
Ukrainian Premier League club SC Tavriya Simferopol was liquidated and a new team was organized in its place, registered according to the laws of Russia. It then was licensed to participate in the third-tier Russian Professional Football League in the 2014–15 season. As Ukraine considers Crimea Ukrainian territory, the Football Federation of Ukraine lodged a complaint with UEFA about Crimean clubs' participation in Russian competitions. On 22 August 2014, UEFA decided "that any football matches played by Crimean clubs organised under the auspices of the Russian Football Union will not be recognised by UEFA until further notice".

On 4 December 2014, UEFA banned Crimean clubs from participating in Russian professional competitions, and announced that a new local Crimean League will be set up in the future that UEFA will manage directly.

The club won the first-ever Crimean Premier League in 2015–2016.

Ahead of the 2022–23 season, the club has announced its intention to compete in the Russian Football National League 2.

== Honours ==
- Crimean Premier League (Tier-I)
  - Champions: 2015–16
  - Runners-up: 2018–19
  - Third place: 2017–18

== Coaches ==
- 2014 Vladimir Martynov
- 2014-2016 Serhiy Vasylyovych Shevchenko
- 2016-2017 Serhiy Yakovych Shevchenko
- 2017 Roman Voinarovsky
- 2017 Maksym Startsev

== League and cup history ==
=== Russia ===
Season	Div.	Pos.	Pl.	W	D	L	GS	GA	P	Domestic Cup	Europe	Notes
2014–15	3rd "South Group 1" (Vtoraya Liga, Yug)	—_{/11}	18	9	3	6	23	16	30	1/256 finals		Annulled

=== Crimea ===
Season	Div.	Pos.	Pl.	W	D	L	GS	GA	P	Domestic Cup	Europe	Notes
2015	1st All-Crimean Championship Gr. B	2_{/10}	9	6	2	1	37	4	20			Reorganization of competitions
2015–16	1st Premier League	1_{/8}	28	21	5	2	53	19	68	1/2 finals		
2016–17	1st Premier League	5_{/8}	28	13	4	11	41	45	43	1/4 finals		
2017–18	1st Premier League	3_{/8}	28	16	7	5	55	28	55	1/4 finals		
2018–19	1st Premier League	2_{/8}	28	13	11	4	46	28	50	1/2 finals		
2019–20	1st Premier League	4_{/8}	28	13	7	8	42	40	46	1/16 finals		
2020–21	1st Premier League	5_{/8}	28	12	4	12	33	31	40	1/4 finals		
2021–22	1st Premier League											
