= FC Bakhchisaray =

Bakhchisaray
- Full name: Futbol'nyy klub Bakhchisaray
- Founded: 2015
- Dissolved: 2017
- Ground: Druzhba Stadium, Bakhchisaray
- Capacity: 4.500
- League: Crimean Premier League
- 2016–17: 8th (relegated, moved to Simferopol)

FC Bakhchisaray (Russian: ФК "Бахчисарай") was a football team based in Bakhchisaray, Crimea.

== History ==
The club was founded in 2015. The initiator of the creation of the professional football club "Bakhchisaray" was the head of the city administration of Bakhchisaray, Vladimir Verkhovod. Also at the origins of the formation of the club was a local businessman Dzhelil Bektash. The professional club was created on the basis of the municipal autonomous institution "Institute for the Development of Bakhchisaray".

In 2017, after the relegation from the Crimean Premier League, the club was moved to Simferopol.

== Team names ==
- 2015–2016: FC Bakhchisaray
- 2015–2017: FC KFU-Bakhchisaray

== Honours ==
- Crimean Premier League (1st Tier)

2015–16

- CFU Cup (National Cup)

2015–16

== League and cup history (Crimea) ==
Season	Div.	Pos.	Pl.	W	D	L	GS	GA	P	Domestic Cup	Europe	Notes
2015	1st All-Crimean Championship Gr. A	6_{/10}	9	3	5	1	20	14	14			Reorganization of competitions
2015–16	1st Premier League	3_{/8}	28	12	5	11	45	46	41	Winner		
2016–17	1st Premier League	8_{/8}	28	2	2	24	19	91	8	1/2 finals		Relegated
