= FC Ocean Kerch =

- Full name: Futbol'nyy klub Okean Kerch
- Founded: 1955 as Metalurh; 1976 as Okean; 2010 (refounded)
- Ground: 50th Anniversary of October Stadium
- Chairman: Oleg Krištáľ
- Head coach: Serhiy Yesin
- League: Crimean Premier League
- 2020–21: 6th

FC Ocean Kerch (Russian: Футбольный клуб «Океан» (Керчь)) is a Crimean football team based in Kerch. After the Russian annexation of Crimea was admitted to the Crimean Premier League as a Russian team.

== Team names ==
- First club (1955–69):
  - 1955–1964: FC Metalurh Kerch
  - 1964–1969: FC Avanhard Kerch
- Second club (1976–97):
  - 1976–1997: FC Okean Kerch
- Third club (2010–present):
  - 2010–present: FC Okean Kerch

== History ==
=== Metallurg ===
The city association football team in Kerch existed as early as 1938 under a name of Stal. It is not known what happened with the original team.

The current club was established in 1955 as Metallurg (Metalurh) soon after the Crimean peninsula was transferred to Ukraine within the Soviet Union, but it was not until 1962 when it represented the city at professional level, competing in the Ukrainian championship of the Soviet Second League. In 1970, the club dissolved again.

=== Okean ===
In 1976 it was revived competing all the way pass the dissolution of the Soviet Union. In 1993 it carried a name of Voikovets, in 1994 – Metalurh. In 1995–96 Ukrainian Cup both Metalurh and Okean participated in the tournament. In 1997, the club lost its professional license and disappeared for quite some time.

In 2010, it was reestablished anew. Following the Russian annexation of Crimea, the Football Federation of Ukraine lodged a complaint with UEFA about Crimean clubs' participation in Russian competitions. On 22 August 2014, UEFA decided "that any football matches played by Crimean clubs organised under the auspices of the Russian Football Union will not be recognised by UEFA until further notice".

On 4 December 2014, UEFA banned Crimean clubs from participating in Russian professional competitions, and announced that a new local Crimean Premier League would be set up in the future that UEFA will manage directly. Ocean Kerch was one of the 8 original clubs that formed the Crimean Premier League for the 2015–16 season.

Ahead of the 2022/2023 season the club has announced its intention to compete in the Russian Football National League 2.

== Honours ==
- Ukrainian Football Amateur Association (tier-IV)
  - Champions (1): 1995–96 (Gr. 6; as Portovyk)
  - Third place (1): 1978
- Crimea championship
  - Champions (7): 1949, 1950, 1954, 1956, 1960, 1962, 1995–96

== Notable people ==
- Anatoliy Kroshchenko, a manager in 1979

== Current squad ==
As of 6 March 2019, according to the official site Archived 6 March 2019 at the Wayback Machine

Note: Flags indicate national team as defined under FIFA eligibility rules; some limited exceptions apply. Players may hold more than one non-FIFA nationality.

No.	Pos.	Nation	Player
1	GK	RUS	Pavel Panyov
5	DF	RUS	Ildar Vagapov
8	MF	RUS	Mikhail Svetozarov
9	FW	RUS	Boris Gogichaishvili
11	FW	RUS	Yakov Ehrlich
14	DF	UKR	Illya Hlushytskyi
15	DF	RUS	Eduard Sturki
17	MF	UKR	Pavlo Hryshchenko
18	MF	RUS	Vladimir Larionov

No.	Pos.	Nation	Player
20	DF	UKR	Mykyta Filatov
28	MF	UKR	Oleksandr Morev
30	GK	RUS	Leonid Dudinov
42	MF	RUS	Ruslan Zinchenko
47	DF	RUS	Maksim Mineyev
77	MF	RUS	Anton Vinnikov
99	MF	UKR	Artur Zhyhulin
—	DF	RUS	Kirill Khvostik
—	FW	RUS	Marlen Abduveliyev

== Coaches (since annexation) ==
- 2014–2016: Artur Olenin
- 2015–2017: Serhiy Yesin
- 2017–present: Oleh Leshchynskyi

== League and cup history ==
=== Soviet Union ===
Season	Div.	Pos.	Pl.	W	D	L	GS	GA	P	Domestic Cup	Europe	Notes
Metalurh Kerch
1962	5th Crimean Championship	...										won play-off against SKCF Sevastopol
1963	3rd Class B, Ukrainian SSR	19_{/20}	38	6	9	23	28	57	21	Zone 2 Ukrainian SSR, 1/8 finals		Zone 2; for play-off against other 19th place
1963	3rd Class B, Ukrainian SSR	38	2	0	1	1	0	1	1	Zone 2 Ukrainian SSR, 1/8 finals		for Places 37–38 lost to Naftovyk Drohobych
1964	3rd Class B, Ukrainian SSR	12_{/16}	30	7	13	10	14	19	27	Zone 3 Ukrainian SSR, 1/8 finals		Zone 3
1964	3rd Class B, Ukrainian SSR	3_{/6}	10	3	4	3	6	8	10	Zone 3 Ukrainian SSR, 1/8 finals		for Places 31–36
Avanhard Kerch
1965	3rd Class B, Ukrainian SSR	14_{/16}	30	8	6	16	30	47	22	Zone 1 Ukrainian SSR, 1/8 finals		Zone 1
1965	3rd Class B, Ukrainian SSR	6_{/6}	10	1	5	4	12	19	7	Zone 1 Ukrainian SSR, 1/8 finals		for Places 31–36
1966	3rd Class B, Ukrainian SSR	11_{/20}	38	13	11	14	41	42	37			Zone 2; for play-off against other 11th place
1966	3rd Class B, Ukrainian SSR	22	refused to play against Avanhard Rivne									for Places 21–22
1967	3rd Class B, Ukrainian SSR	20_{/21}	40	5	12	23	22	52	22	Zone 2 Ukrainian SSR, 1/8 finals		Zone 2
1968	3rd Class B, Ukrainian SSR	17_{/21}	40	9	14	17	32	46	32	Zone Crimea, 1/4 finals		Zone 2
1969	3rd Class B, Ukrainian SSR	21_{/21}	40	9	10	21	22	45	28			Zone 2 Withdrew
in 1970–1976 club's history is unknown
Okean Kerch
1977	4th KFK Ukrainian SSR Gr. 5	3_{/12}	22	13	2	7	36	20	28			
1978	4th KFK Ukrainian SSR Gr. 5	1_{/10}	18	14	2	2	32	12	30			to final stage
1978	4th KFK Ukrainian SSR Gr. 5	3_{/6}	5	2	0	3	4	4	4			Promoted
1979	3rd Second League Gr. 2	18_{/24}	46	12	14	20	36	52	38			
1980	3rd Second League Gr. 5	14_{/23}	44	13	12	19	40	49	38			
1981	3rd Second League Gr. 5	13_{/23}	44	13	14	17	45	51	40			
1982	3rd Second League Gr. 6	23_{/24}	46	12	11	23	43	67	35			
1983	3rd Second League Gr. 6	19_{/26}	50	13	16	21	44	58	42			
1984	3rd Second League Gr. 6	25_{/26}	38	9	10	19	38	65	28			two stages
1985	3rd Second League Gr. 6	14_{/28}	40	12	8	20	42	62	32			two stages
1986	3rd Second League Gr. 6	14_{/28}	40	14	4	22	46	63	32			two stages
1988	3rd Second League Gr. 5	4_{/26}	50	24	11	15	71	60	59			
1989	3rd Second League Gr. 6	24_{/27}	52	15	9	28	50	70	39	1/32 finals		Relegated to newly formed division
1990	4th Lower Second League Gr. 1	17_{/19}	36	7	9	20	31	55	23	1/32 finals		
1991	4th Lower Second League Gr. 1	24_{/26}	50	15	10	25	49	72	40			Reorganization of competitions

=== Ukraine ===
Season	Div.	Pos.	Pl.	W	D	L	GS	GA	P	Domestic Cup	Europe	Notes
1992	3rd Transitional League Gr. 2	6_{/9}	16	6	5	5	16	10	17			Reorganization of competitions
1992–93	4th Transitional League	5_{/18}	34	17	8	9	47	32	42			Promoted
1993–94	3rd Second League	19_{/22}	42	12	11	19	50	69	35	1/16 finals		name change
1994–95	3rd Second League	19_{/22}	42	11	5	26	42	67	38	1/64 finals		Relegated
1995–96	4th Amateur League Gr. 6	1_{/4}	6	5	0	1	6	3	15	1/64 finals		Promoted
1996–97	3rd Second League Gr. B	17_{/17}	32	6	5	21	27	57	23	1/128 finals		Withdrew
idle in 2000s
2012	5th Crimean Championship	10_{/12}	22	4	4	14	17	64	16			
...
2014	5th Crimean Championship	10_{/16}	14	7	3	4	26	19	24			Reorganization of competitions

=== Crimea ===
Season	Div.	Pos.	Pl.	W	D	L	GS	GA	P	Domestic Cup	Europe	Notes
2015	1st All-Crimean Championship Gr. A	2_{/10}	9	6	1	2	21	9	19			Reorganization of competitions
2015–16	1st Premier League	5_{/8}	28	9	7	12	31	37	34	Group stage		
2016–17	1st Premier League	4_{/8}	28	14	4	10	46	34	46	1/4 finals		
2017–18	1st Premier League	6_{/8}	28	5	8	15	32	47	23	1/4 finals		
2018–19	1st Premier League	4_{/8}	28	11	4	13	34	48	37	1/2 finals		
2019–20	1st Premier League	6_{/8}	28	7	3	18	34	58	24	1/4 finals		
2020–21	1st Premier League	6_{/8}	28	11	6	11	40	35	39	1/4 finals		
2021–22	1st Premier League											
