= FC Rubin Yalta =

Rubin Yalta
- Full name: Futbol'nyy klub Rubin Yalta
- Founded: 2009
- Ground: Avangard Stadium, Yalta
- Capacity: 4,000
- Chairman: Kirill Shaposhnikov
- Manager: Aleksey Grachyov
- League: Russian Second League; Division B Group 1
- 2026: 7th
- Website: rubin-yalta.ru

FC Rubin Yalta (Russian: ФК «Рубин» Ялта) is an association football team from Yalta, Crimea.

== History ==
It plays in Avanhard Stadium (ru: стадион Авангард) on Biryukova St, 2а, Yalta, Crimea, 98601. The kit colors for home are red shirts and shorts and white socks. The kit colors for away are white shirts and socks and red shorts.

The club was established in 2009. After the Russian annexation of Crimea the club was forced to be reconstituted as a Russian club and then was allowed to be admitted to the Crimean Premier League.

Before the 2023–24 season, Rubin received the license for newly organized Russian fourth-tier Russian Second League division B.

== Current squad ==
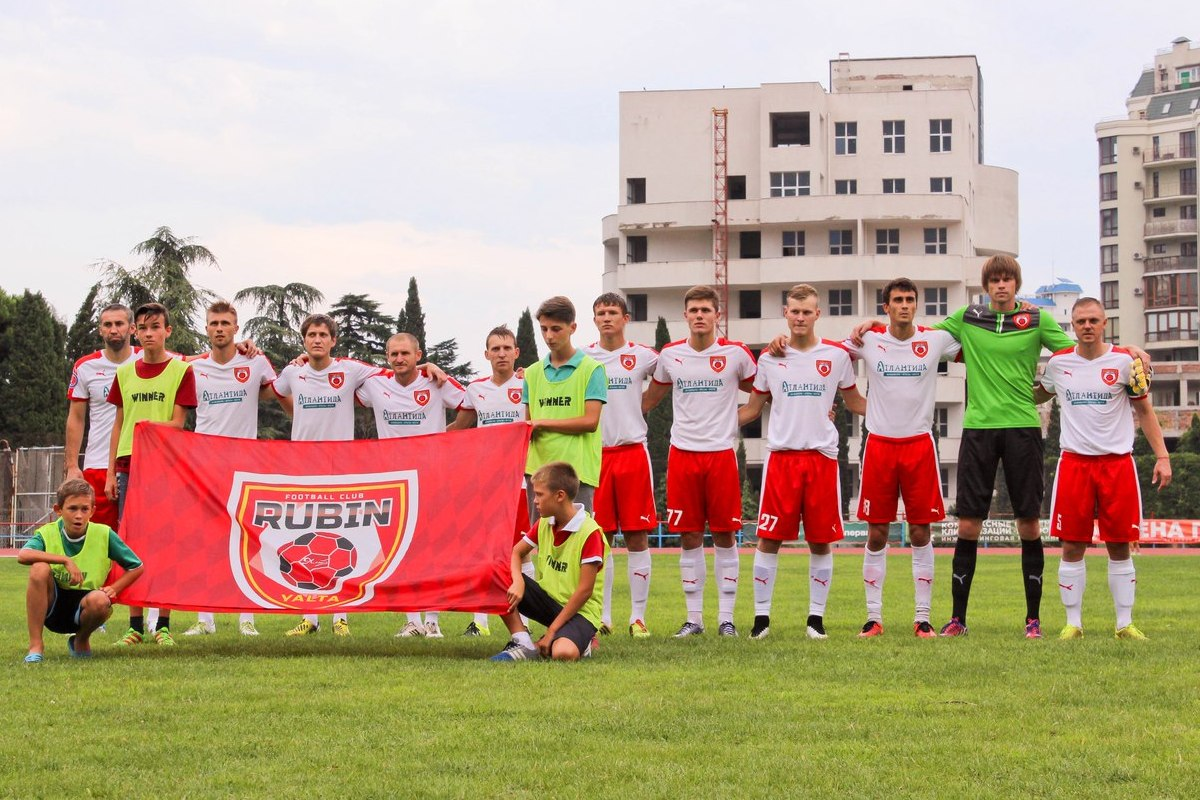
in 2016

As of 11 September 2026, according to the Second League website.

Note: Flags indicate national team as defined under FIFA eligibility rules; some limited exceptions apply. Players may hold more than one non-FIFA nationality.

| No. | Pos. | Nation | Player |
|---|---|---|---|
| 1 | GK | RUS | Ilya Ivanov |
| 5 | DF | RUS | Ilya Kazakov |
| 7 | FW | RUS | Danil Polyakh |
| 8 | MF | RUS | Yegor Biryukov |
| 9 | DF | RUS | Beka Dzhanelidze |
| 10 | MF | RUS | Sarkis Papazyan |
| 11 | MF | RUS | Danila Polshikov |
| 15 | MF | RUS | Albert Naniyev |
| 19 | MF | RUS | Roman Protsenko |
| 21 | MF | RUS | Aleksandr Khvatayev |
| 23 | MF | RUS | Gennady Raskind |

| No. | Pos. | Nation | Player |
|---|---|---|---|
| 25 | MF | RUS | Ilya Romashchuk |
| 31 | GK | RUS | Georgy Tuayev |
| 33 | FW | RUS | Vyacheslav Purak |
| 51 | DF | RUS | Yelisey Yemelyanov |
| 55 | FW | RUS | Igor Tursunov |
| 67 | DF | RUS | Grigory Tarnov |
| 68 | MF | RUS | Andrey Koltakov |
| 77 | MF | RUS | Oleg Korotkov |
| 88 | MF | RUS | Nikita Panamaryov |
| 89 | GK | RUS | Mikhail Pasichnik |
| 93 | DF | RUS | Sergey Shulga |

== League and cup history (Crimea) ==
| Season | Div. | Pos. | Pl. | W | D | L | GS | GA | P | Domestic Cup | Europe | Notes |
|---|---|---|---|---|---|---|---|---|---|---|---|---|
| 2015 | 1st All-Crimean Championship Gr. B | 4_{/10} | 9 | 5 | 3 | 1 | 16 | 5 | 18 | | | Reorganization of competitions |
| 2015–16 | 1st Premier League | 7_{/8} | 28 | 9 | 5 | 14 | 33 | 38 | 32 | Group stage | | 1st–2nd league match (winner) |
| 2016–17 | 1st Premier League | 7_{/8} | 28 | 7 | 7 | 14 | 25 | 42 | 28 | 1/4 finals | | |
| 2017–18 | 1st Premier League | 8_{/8} | 28 | 2 | 7 | 19 | 18 | 68 | 13 | 1/2 finals | | Relegated |
| 2018–19 | 2nd Open Championship | 3_{/17} | 29 | 21 | 3 | 5 | 98 | 42 | 66 | | | |
| 2019–20 | 2nd Open Championship | 3_{/12} | 22 | 17 | 2 | 3 | 94 | 20 | 53 | 1/8 finals | | |
| 2020–21 | 2nd Open Championship | 1_{/7} | 12 | 9 | 3 | 0 | 41 | 9 | 30 | | | Promoted |
| 2021–22 | 1st Premier League | | | | | | | | | | | |
