= 2014–15 in Ukrainian football =

Football in Ukraine
- Season: 2014–15

Men's football
- Premier League: Dynamo Kyiv
- League 1: FC Oleksandriya
- League 2: Cherkaskyi Dnipro
- Amateur League: Balkany Zorya (2015); Rukh Vynnyky (2014)
- Cup: Dynamo Kyiv
- Amateur Cup: Hirnyk Sosnivka (2015); AF Piatykhatska (2014)
- Super Cup: Shakhtar Donetsk

Women's football
- League High: Zhytlobud-1 Kharkiv (2015); Zhytlobud-1 Kharkiv (2014)
- League 1: Pantery Uman (2015); Nika Poltava (2014)
- Women's Cup: Zhytlobud-1 Kharkiv (2015); Zhytlobud-1 Kharkiv (2014)

The 2014–15 season was the 24th season of competitive association football in Ukraine since dissolution of the Soviet Union.

== Men's club football ==
League	Promoted to league	Relegated from league
Premier League	Olimpik Donetsk	~~FC Sevastopol~~; ~~Tavriya Simferopol~~; ~~Arsenal Kyiv~~
League One	Hirnyk-Sport Komsomolsk; Stal Dniprodzerzhynsk; FC Ternopil; Hirnyk Kryvyi Rih	~~UkrAhroKom Holovkivka~~; ~~Tytan Armyansk~~; Avanhard Kramatorsk (suspended)
League Two	none	~~Shakhtar Sverdlovsk~~; ~~FC Karlivka~~; ~~Myr Hornostayivka~~; ~~Enerhiya Mykolaiv~~; ~~Dynamo Khmelnytskyi~~

Note: For all scratched clubs, see section Clubs removed for more details

=== Premier League ===
Pos	Team	Pld	W	D	L	GF	GA	GD	Pts	Qualification or relegation
1	Dynamo Kyiv (C)	26	20	6	0	65	12	+53	66	Qualification for the Champions League group stage
2	Shakhtar Donetsk	26	17	5	4	71	21	+50	56	Qualification for the Champions League third qualifying round
3	Dnipro Dnipropetrovsk	26	16	6	4	47	17	+30	54	Qualification for the Europa League group stage (Note: Since winners of 2014–15 Ukrainian Cup, Dynamo Kyiv, qualified for the 2015–16 UEFA Champions League, the place in the Europa League group stage for the cup winner will be given to the third-placed team and the spots to Europa League third qualifying round will be given to the fourth-placed and fifth-placed teams.)
4	Zorya Luhansk (Note: Zorya Luhansk were initially deducted a total of 3 points on decision of the FFU Control Disciplinary Committee on 18 February 2015, but the decision was reversed and the FFU reinstated the three points to Zorya Luhansk. (17 June 2015))	26	13	6	7	40	31	+9	45	Qualification for the Europa League third qualifying round
5	Vorskla Poltava	26	11	9	6	35	22	+13	42	Qualification for the Europa League third qualifying round
6	Metalist Kharkiv	25	8	11	6	34	32	+2	35	
7	Metalurh Zaporizhya	26	6	8	12	20	40	−20	26	
8	Olimpik Donetsk	26	7	5	14	24	64	−40	26	
9	Volyn Lutsk (Note: Volyn Lutsk were deducted a total of 9 points on decision of the FFU Control and Disciplinary Committee (24 February 2015))	26	9	7	10	38	44	−6	25	
10	Metalurh Donetsk (Note: Metalurh Donetsk were deducted a total of 6 points on decision of the FIFA Disciplinary Committee (9 September 2014). After the season completed the president of FC Stal Dniprodzerzhynsk announced that the club will be merged with FC Metalurh Donetsk and replace them in the Premier League for the 2015–16 season. (14 June 2015))	26	6	10	10	27	38	−11	22	Club folded after the season
11	Chornomorets Odesa	25	3	11	11	15	31	−16	20	
12	Hoverla Uzhhorod	26	3	10	13	22	47	−25	19	
13	Karpaty Lviv (Note: Karpaty Lviv were deducted a total of 9 points. Initially three points were deducted and then additional 6 points for non compliance with contractual agreements with player agents (regarding Martin Bogatinov).)	26	5	9	12	22	31	−9	15	
14	Illichivets Mariupol (R)	26	3	5	18	25	55	−30	14	Relegation to Ukrainian First League

Source: uafootball.net.ua
Rules for classification: 1) points; 2) goal difference; 3) goals scored; 4) head-to-head points; 5) head-to-head goal difference; 6) head-to-head goals scored; 7) fair play rating
(C) Champions; (R) Relegated

=== League 1 ===
Pos	Team	Pld	W	D	L	GF	GA	GD	Pts	Promotion, qualification or relegation
1	FC Oleksandriya (C, P)	30	22	6	2	53	15	+38	72	Promoted to Ukrainian Premier League
2	Stal Dniprodzerzhynsk (Note: After the season completed the president of FC Stal Dniprodzerzhynsk announced that the club would merge with FC Metalurh Donetsk and were to replace them in the Premier League for the 2015–16 season. (14 June 2015) Initially, the club name attempted to use the name of FC Metalurh Donetsk but subsequently that club declared bankruptcy. Stal Dniprodzerzhynsk was promoted on decision of the Ukrainian Football Federation.) (P)	30	17	9	4	45	21	+24	60	Promoted to Ukrainian Premier League
3	Hirnyk-Sport Komsomolsk	30	16	9	5	44	24	+20	57	
4	Zirka Kirovohrad	30	14	7	9	42	27	+15	49	
5	Desna Chernihiv	30	12	11	7	44	27	+17	47	
6	Dynamo-2 Kyiv	30	12	8	10	35	29	+6	44	
7	Helios Kharkiv	30	12	8	10	30	25	+5	44	
8	FC Sumy	30	12	7	11	35	41	−6	43	
9	Hirnyk Kryvyi Rih	30	10	12	8	32	26	+6	42	
10	FC Poltava	30	11	9	10	29	27	+2	42	
11	FC Ternopil	30	11	8	11	33	49	−16	41	
12	Naftovyk-Ukrnafta Okhtyrka	30	10	10	10	32	34	−2	40	
13	Nyva Ternopil	30	8	3	19	25	52	−27	27	
14	MFC Mykolaiv (O)	30	6	6	18	34	67	−33	24	Qualification to relegation play-offs
15	Stal Alchevsk (D)	30	5	0	25	16	28	−12	15	Withdrew (Note: Stal Alchevsk temporarily withdrew from the competition during the winter break due to the war in Donbas with expectation to return possibly for the next season.)
16	Bukovyna Chernivtsi (R)	30	4	3	23	24	61	−37	15	Relegated to Ukrainian Second League

Source: (in Ukrainian) Professional Football League of Ukraine
Rules for classification: 1) points 2) goal difference 3) goals scored
4) head-to-head points 5) head-to-head goal difference 6) head-to-head goals scored
7) head-to-head fair play (all games) 8) draw or playoff
(C) Champions; (D) Disqualified; (O) Play-off winners; (P) Promoted; (R) Relegated

== Promotion/relegation play-off ==
A promotion/relegation home and away play-off is to be played by the 3rd place team of 2014–15 Ukrainian Second League against the 14th placed team of the 2014–15 Ukrainian First League competition. Seedings for the playoff were announced in Ukrainian House of Football on May 29.

Team 1	Agg.	Team 2	1st leg	2nd leg
MFC Mykolaiv	1–0	FC Kremin Kremenchuk	0–0	1–0

=== League 2 ===
Pos	Team	Pld	W	D	L	GF	GA	GD	Pts	Promotion, qualification or relegation
1	Cherkaskyi Dnipro (C, P)	27	20	5	2	54	12	+42	65	Promoted to Ukrainian First League
2	Obolon-Brovar Kyiv (P)	27	20	4	3	47	19	+28	64	Promoted to Ukrainian First League
3	Kremin Kremenchuk (Q)	27	14	6	7	50	30	+20	48	Qualification for promotion play-off
4	Real Pharma Ovidiopol	27	11	9	7	40	29	+11	42	
5	Skala Stryi	27	11	5	11	29	34	−5	38	
6	Krystal Kherson	27	10	6	11	39	37	+2	36	
7	Shakhtar-3 Donetsk	27	8	6	13	38	44	−6	30	Withdrew (Note: After the season completed, the General Director of FC Shakhtar Donetsk Serhiy Palkin confirmed the club's decision on the discontinuation of Shakhtar-3 Donetsk existence. (3 June 2015))
8	NPHU-Makiyivvuhillya Nikopol (Note: Makiyivvuhillya Makiyivka changed their name during the winter break to NPHU-Makiyivvuhillya and are based Nikopol continuing to play their home games at Sport Training Base - Kolos in the village of Chkalovo in Nikopol Raion)	27	5	6	16	23	45	−22	21	Reorganized (Note: At the 2015 PFL Conference it was decided that NPHU-Makiyivvuhillya withdrew from the league and were replaced with FC Nikopol-NPHU.)
9	Arsenal-Kyivshchyna Bila Tserkva	27	6	2	19	14	40	−26	20	
10	Enerhiya Nova Kakhovka	27	4	3	20	25	69	−44	15	

Source: (in Ukrainian) Professional Football League of Ukraine
Rules for classification: 1) points 2) goal difference 3) goals scored 4) head-to-head points 5) head-to-head goal difference 6) head-to-head goals scored 7) head-to-head fair play (all games) 8) draw or playoff
(C) Champions; (P) Promoted; (Q) Qualified for the phase indicated

=== Cup competitions ===
==== Ukrainian Cup ====
4 June 2015
21:00

Dynamo Kyiv	0–0 (a.e.t.)	Shakhtar Donetsk
	Report
Penalties
Veloso (penalty missed); Dragović (penalty scored); Antunes (penalty missed); Husyev (penalty scored); Yarmolenko (penalty scored); Belhanda (penalty scored); Khacheridi (penalty scored)	5–4	(penalty scored) Srna; (penalty scored) Luiz Adriano; (penalty scored) Douglas Costa; (penalty missed) Taison; (penalty missed) Rakytskiy; (penalty scored) Teixeira; (penalty missed) Hladkyy

NSC Olimpiyskiy, Kyiv
Attendance: 53,455
Referee: Yuriy Mozharovsky (Lviv)

==== Super Cup ====
22 July 2014

Dynamo Kyiv	0–2	Shakhtar Donetsk
	Report	Hladkyi 75'; Marlos 90+3'

Arena Lviv, Lviv
Attendance: 34,347
Referee: Yuriy Mozharovskyi

== Women's club football ==
League	Promoted to league	Relegated from league
Higher League	Voskhod Stara Maiachka	~~Lehenda-ShVSM Chernihiv~~; Ateks SDIuShOR-16 Kyiv

Note: For all scratched clubs, see section Clubs removed for more details

=== Higher League ===
2014 Vyshcha Liha (women)
