= 2014–15 Ukrainian Cup =

Kubok Ukrainy

Tournament details
- Country: Ukraine
- Dates: 6 August 2014 – 30 May 2015; 6 August 2014 (preliminary round); 22 August 2014 – 30 May 2015 (main event)
- Teams: 39

Final positions
- Champions: Dynamo Kyiv (11th title)
- Runners-up: Shakhtar Donetsk
- Semifinalists: Dnipro Dnipropetrovsk; Olimpik Donetsk
- UEFA Europa League: none (Note: both finalists qualified for the UEFA Champions League)

Tournament statistics
- Matches played: 51
- Goals scored: 125 (2.45 per match)
- Top goal scorer: 5 – Anton Kotlyar (Stal D.)

The 2014–15 Ukrainian Cup was the 24th annual season of Ukraine's football knockout competition. The decision on a schedule of competitions for clubs of the First and Second League and amateur leagues composition was confirmed on 23 July 2014 at a session of Central Council of the Professional Football League of Ukraine.

Due to the Russian occupation of the Eastern Ukraine with the ongoing Russo-Ukrainian War, many clubs from the region were forced to play their home games in Kyiv, while other withdrew.

== Team allocation ==
Thirty nine teams entered into the Ukrainian Cup competition. There were several changes implemented for the competition. Prior to each round's draw, starting from the competition proper (round of 32) seedings were introduced according to the team's ranking according to their respective league competition. The round of 16, quarter finals and semi finals will be played as two legged fixtures.

The competition included most of professional first teams from the Premier League (14/14 teams of the league), First League (15/16), Second League (8/10) and two best teams from the previous year's Amateur Cup.

=== Distribution ===
Preliminary round (14 teams)	4 entrants from the First League; 8 entrants from the Second League; 2 entrants from the Amateur Cup	
Tournament proper (32 teams)	14 entrants from the Premier League; 11 entrants from the First League	7 winners from the preliminary round

=== Round and draw dates ===
Phase	Round	Draw date	Game date
Qualifying	Preliminary round	24 July 2014	6 August 2014
Main event	Round of 32	13 August 2014	23 August 2014
Main event	Round of 16	26 August 2014	First leg: 27 September 2014
Main event	Round of 16	26 August 2014	Second leg: 29 October 2014
Main event	Quarter-finals	31 October 2014	First leg: 3 December 2014
Main event	Quarter-finals	31 October 2014	Second leg: 8 April 2015
Main event	Semi-finals	9 April 2015	First leg: 29 April 2015
Main event	Semi-finals	9 April 2015	Second leg: 20 May 2015
Main event	Final	30 May 2015	

=== Teams ===
Enter in Preliminary Round			Enter in Round of 32	
AAFU; 2 teams	PFL League 2; 8/10 teams	PFL League 1; 4/16 teams	PFL League 1; 11/16 teams	UPL; 14/14 teams
Chaika Petropavlivska Borshchahivka; Yednist Plysky	Arsenal-Kyivshchyna; Cherkaskyi Dnipro; Enerhiya Nova Kakhovka; Kremin Kremenchuk; Krystal Kherson; ~~Makiivvuhillya Makiivka~~; Obolon-Brovar Kyiv; Real Pharma Odesa; Skala Stryi	Hirnyk Kryvyi Rih; Hirnyk-Sport; Stal Dniprodzerzhynsk; FC Ternopil	Bukovyna Chernivtsi; Desna Chernihiv; Helios Kharkiv; MFC Mykolaiv; Naftovyk-Ukrnafta; Nyva Ternopil; FC Oleksandriya; FC Poltava; Stal Alchevsk; PFC Sumy; Zirka Kirovohrad	Chornomorets Odesa; Dnipro Dnipropetrovsk; Dynamo Kyiv; Hoverla Uzhhorod; Illichivets Mariupol; Karpaty Lviv; Metalist Kharkiv; Metalurh Donetsk; Metalurh Zaporizhia; Olimpik Donetsk; Shakhtar Donetsk; Volyn Lutsk; Vorskla Poltava; Zorya Luhansk

Notes:

- With the asterisk (*) are noted the Second League teams that were recently admitted to the league from amateurs and the AAFU (amateur) team(s) that qualified in place of the Amateur Cup finalist(s).
- Reserve teams Dynamo-2 from the First League and Shakhtar-3 from the Second League were not included in the draw. One more professional team of Makiivvuhillya Makiivka was not included in the draw after it was forced to relocate to Nikopol from Makiivka.

== Bracket ==
The following is the tournament bracket that demonstrates the last five rounds of the Ukrainian Cup, including the final match. Numbers in parentheses next to the match score represent the results of a penalty shoot-out.

Round of 32
MFC Mykolaiv	0
Illichivets Mariupol	1
Nyva Ternopil	1
Vorskla Poltava	5
Real Pharma Ovidiopol	0
Olimpik Donetsk	1
Helios Kharkiv	0
Metalurh Zaporizhia	1
FC Ternopil	1 (3)
FC Oleksandriya (p)	1 (4)
Kremin Kremenchuk	0
Zorya Luhansk	2
Chaika Petropavlivska Borshchahivka	0
Karpaty Lviv	4
Zirka Kirovohrad	1
Dynamo Kyiv	3
FC Poltava	2
Metalurh Donetsk	1
Obolon-Brovar Kyiv	0
Shakhtar Donetsk	1
Cherkaskyi Dnipro	1
Hoverla Uzhhorod	2
FC Sumy	0
Metalist Kharkiv (a.e.t.)	1
Desna Chernihiv	0
Dnipro Dnipropetrovsk	1
Naftovyk-Ukrnafta Okhtyrka	0
Volyn Lutsk	1
Bukovyna Chernivtsi	0
Chornomorets Odesa	4
Stal Alchevsk	-
Stal Dniprodzerzhynsk	+

Round of 16
Illichivets Mariupol	0	2	2
Vorskla Poltava	1	3	4
Olimpik Donetsk	2	4	6
Metalurh Zaporizhia	0	0	0
FC Oleksandriya	0	1	1
Zorya Luhansk	1	1	2
Karpaty Lviv	0	0	0
Dynamo Kyiv	1	1	2
FC Poltava	1	1	2
Shakhtar Donetsk	5	4	9
Hoverla Uzhhorod	2	1	3
Metalist Kharkiv (a)	2	1	3
Volyn Lutsk	1	0	1
Dnipro Dnipropetrovsk	0	4	4
Stal Dniprodzerzhynsk	2	1	3 (2)
Chornomorets Odesa (p)	1	2	3 (4)

Quarter-finals
Vorskla Poltava	0	0	0
Olimpik Donetsk	0	1	1
Zorya Luhansk	1	0	1
Dynamo Kyiv	2	2	4
Metalist Kharkiv	0	0	0
Shakhtar Donetsk	2	1	3
Chornomorets Odesa	0	0	0
Dnipro Dnipropetrovsk	4	1	5

Semi-finals
Olimpik Donetsk	0	1	1
Dynamo Kyiv	0	4	4
Dnipro Dnipropetrovsk	0	1	1
Shakhtar Donetsk	1	1	2

Final
4 June – Kyiv
Dynamo Kyiv (p)	0 (5)
Shakhtar Donetsk	2 (4)

== Competition schedule ==
=== Preliminary round (1/64) ===
In this round entered 4 clubs from the First League, 8 clubs from the Second League and the finalists of the Ukrainian Amateur Cup. The round matches were played on 6 August 2014.

6 August 2014	Yednist Plysky (AM)	0–1	(1L) FC Ternopil	Plysky, Chernihiv Oblast
17:00		Report	Semenets 25'	Stadium: Yednist; Attendance: 400; Referee: Andriy Kutakov (Brovary)

6 August 2014	Arsenal-Kyivshchyna Bila Tserkva (2L)	3–4 (a.e.t.)	(2L) Real Pharma Ovidiopol	Bila Tserkva, Kyiv Oblast
18:30	Andreyev 69'; Fedosov 72', 81'	Report	Novytskyi 6'; Fayuk 34'; Yakymenko 89', 120'	Stadium: Trudovi Rezervy; Attendance: 700; Referee: Andriy Yablonskyi (Ternopil)

6 August 2014	Chaika Kyiv-Sviatoshyn Raion (AM)	3–0	(2L) Enerhiya Nova Kakhovka	Irpin, Kyiv Oblast
18:00	Palamarchuk 17'; Baranovych 58'; Kozoriz 65' (pen.)	Report		Stadium: Nalohovoi Akademii; Attendance: 300; Referee: Dmytro Kononov (Donetsk)

6 August 2014	Kremin Kremenchuk (2L)	2–0	(1L) Hirnyk-Sport Komsomolsk	Kremenchuk, Poltava Oblast
18:00	Cherniy 2', 45'	Report		Stadium: Kremin Arena; Attendance: 1,700; Referee: Yuriy Hrysyo (Lviv)

6 August 2014	Cherkaskyi Dnipro (2L)	1–0	(2L) Skala Stryi	Cherkasy
19:00	Zakharevych 47'	Report		Stadium: Tsentralnyi; Attendance: 1,450; Referee: Volodymyr Bondar (Kharkiv)

6 August 2014	Obolon-Brovar Kyiv (2L)	3–1	(1L) Hirnyk Kryvyi Rih	Kyiv
19:00	Prodan 54'; Kovalenko 64'; Korolchuk 84'	Report	Sitalo 46'	Stadium: Obolon Arena; Attendance: 1,500; Referee: Mykhailo Mytrovskyi (Uzhhorod)

7 August 2014	Krystal Kherson (2L)	2–4	(1L) Stal Dniprodzerzhynsk	Kherson
18:00	Dovbysh (red card) 52'; Tkachov 76'; Martyan 82'	Report	Kotlyar 22' (pen.), 51' (pen.); Pleshakov 58', 69'	Stadium: Krystal; Attendance: 500; Referee: Andriy Lisakovskyi (Odesa)

=== Round of 32 ===
In this round all 14 teams from the 2014–15 Ukrainian Premier League, 11 clubs from 2014–15 Ukrainian First League (except Dynamo-2 Kyiv) and 7 winners from the preliminary round enter this stage of the competition which also includes 4 teams from the 2014–15 Ukrainian Second League and last season's Ukrainian Amateur Cup finalist. The draw for this round was held 13 August 2014 at the House of Football in Kyiv. The round matches are scheduled to be played on 23 August 2014.

22 August 2014^{(4)}	FC Ternopil (1L)	1–1 (a.e.t.) (3–4 p)	(1L) FC Oleksandriya	Ternopil
18:30	Bohdanov 2'	Report	Chepurnenko 10'	Stadium: Miskyi; Attendance: 7,000; Referee: Denys Shurman (Vyshneve)
	Penalties
	Kurylo (penalty scored); Atlasyuk (penalty scored); Klekot (penalty missed); Bohdanov (penalty scored); Hromyak (penalty missed)		(penalty scored) Banada; (penalty missed) Ivashchenko; (penalty scored) Chepurnenko; (penalty scored) Kolomoyets; (penalty scored) Mykytsey

23 August 2014	MFC Mykolaiv (1L)	0–1	(PL) Illichivets Mariupol	Mykolaiv
16:00		Report	Yavorsky 77'	Stadium: Tsentralnyi; Attendance: 2,000; Referee: V.Bondar (Kharkiv)

23 August 2014	FC Poltava (1L)	2–1	(PL) Metalurh Donetsk	Poltava
16:30	Korkishko 30' (pen.); Nasibulin 90+1'	Report	Akymenko 40'	Stadium: Lokomotov; Attendance: 2,000; Referee: O.Pavlyuk (Kyiv)

23 August 2014	Bukovyna Chernivtsi (1L)	0–4	(PL) Chornomorets Odesa	Chernivtsi
17:00		Report	Arzhanov 4'; Didenko 17'; Nazarenko 29', 49'	Stadium: Bukovyna; Attendance: 4,900; Referee: I.Paskhal (Kherson)

23 August 2014	Desna Chernihiv (1L)	0–1	(PL) Dnipro Dnipropetrovsk	Chernihiv
17:00		Report	Cheberyachko 36'	Stadium: imeni Haharina; Attendance: 7,100; Referee: A.Yablonsky (Ternopil)

23 August 2014	Nyva Ternopil (1L)	1–5	(PL) Vorskla Poltava	Ternopil
17:00	Semenyuk 2'	Report	Chesnakov 9'; Tkachuk 25'; Yanuzi 43'; Kovpak 57'; Hromov 81'	Stadium: Miskyi; Attendance: 2,500; Referee: M.Mytrovsky (Uzhhorod)

23 August 2014	Chaika Kyiv-Sviatoshyn Raion (AM)	0–4	(PL) Karpaty Lviv	Irpin, Kyiv Oblast
17:00		Report	Holodyuk 10'; Ksyonz 25'; Serhiychuk 32'; Kostevych 48'	Stadium: National University of State Taxation Service of Ukraine^{(5)} Attendance: 1,000; Referee: V.Milanych (Mykolaiv)

23 August 2014	Real Pharma Ovidiopol (2L)	0–1	(PL) Olimpik Donetsk	Odesa
17:30		Report	Lysenko 31'	Stadium: Ivan; Attendance: 850; Referee: M.Balakin (Kyiv region)

23 August 2014	Naftovyk-Ukrnafta Okhtyrka (1L)	0–1	(PL) Volyn Lutsk	Okhtyrka, Sumy Oblast
18:00		Report	Bicfalvi 3'	Stadium: Naftovyk; Attendance: 2,500; Referee: A.Kuzmin (Mykolaiv)

23 August 2014	Helios Kharkiv (1L)	0–1	(PL) Metalurh Zaporizhya	Kharkiv
18:00		Report	Yusov 62'	Stadium: Sonyachny Training Center; Attendance: 1,000; Referee: V.Novokhatniy (Kyiv)

23 August 2014	Zirka Kirovohrad (1L)	1–3	(PL) Dynamo Kyiv	Kirovohrad
18:00	Batsula 90+1'	Report	Kravets 2'; Kalytvyntsev 12'; Dragović 66'	Stadium: Zirka; Attendance: 12,890; Referee: Y.Hrysyo (Lviv)

23 August 2014	Cherkaskyi Dnipro (2L)	1–2	(PL) Hoverla Uzhhorod	Cherkasy
19:00	Bessalov 14'	Report	Kuznetsov 45+3'; Shatskikh 68'	Stadium: Tsentralnyi; Attendance: 4,200; Referee: A.Kutakov (Vinnytsia)

23 August 2014	Obolon-Brovar Kyiv (2L)	0–1	(PL) Shakhtar Donetsk	Kyiv
19:30		Report	Luiz Adriano 90+2' (pen.)	Stadium: Obolon Arena; Attendance: 4,500; Referee: A.Lisakovsky (Odesa)

24 August 2014^{(6)}	Kremin Kremenchuk (2L)	0–2	(PL) Zorya Luhansk	Kremenchuk, Poltava Oblast
17:00		Report	Boroday 41'; Lipartia 47'	Stadium: Kremin Arena; Attendance: 1,700; Referee: D.Zhukov (Donetsk)

24 August 2014^{(7)}	FC Sumy (1L)	0–1 (a.e.t.)	(PL) Metalist Kharkiv	Sumy
19:30		Report	Kulakov 108'	Stadium: Yuvileiny; Attendance: 7,200; Referee: A.Hrysyo (Lviv)

Stal Alchevsk (1L)	w/o^{(8)}	(1L) Stal Dniprodzerzhynsk
			Referee: N/A

Notes:

^(4) The match between FC Ternopil and FC Oleksandriya has been brought forward one day due to schedule conflict as two games are scheduled at Ternopil City Stadium (the other being between Nyva and Vorskla).

^(5) Мatch to be played at the Stadium of the National University of State Taxation Service of Ukraine in Irpin, since Chaika's home ground Kozak Arena in Petropavlivsk Borschahivka, Kyiv-Sviatoshyn Raion is unsuitable due to its artificial surface.

^(6) Match to be played on 24 August, Independence Day by mutual agreement of the teams.

^(7) Match to be played on 24 August, Independence Day by mutual agreement of the teams.

^(8) Stal Alchevsk withdrew from the competition. Stal Dniprodzerzhynsk advanced to the next round of the competition.

=== Round of 16 ===
In this round 13 teams from the 2014–15 Ukrainian Premier League, 3 clubs from 2014–15 Ukrainian First League. The round matches are played in two legs. The first leg will be played from the 25 September through on 28 September and the second leg was scheduled to be played 29 October 2014. The draw for this round was held 26 August 2014 at the House of Football in Kyiv.

==== First leg ====
25 September 2014	FC Poltava (1L)	1–5	(PL) Shakhtar Donetsk	Poltava
16:00	Fomych 37'	Report	Teixeira 45+1', 75'; Hladkyy 57'; Chyhrynskyi 79'; Dentinho 90+5' (pen.)	Stadium: Lokomotov Stadium; Attendance: 2,500; Referee: Oleksandr Derdo (Illichivsk)

26 September 2014	FC Oleksandriya (1L)	0–1	(PL) Zorya Luhansk	Oleksandriya, Kirovohrad Oblast
18:30		Report	Malyshev 56'	Stadium: Nika Stadium; Attendance: 5,200; Referee: Viktor Shevtsov (Odesa)

27 September 2014	Illichivets Mariupol (PL)	0–1	(PL) Vorskla Poltava	Dnipropetrovsk
14:00		Report	Kovpak 11' (pen.)	Stadium: Meteor Stadium; Attendance: 210; Referee: Serhiy Dankovskyi (Kyiv)

27 September 2014	Hoverla Uzhhorod (PL)	2–2	(PL) Metalist Kharkiv	Uzhhorod
17:00	Kaverin 11'; Myakushko 67'	Report	Xavier 55', 88'	Stadium: Avanhard Stadium; Attendance: 3,850; Referee: Serhiy Berezka (Kyiv Oblast)

27 September 2014	Volyn Lutsk (PL)	1–0	(PL) Dnipro Dnipropetrovsk	Lutsk
17:00	Bicfalvi 37' (pen.)	Report		Stadium: Avanhard Stadium; Attendance: 6,100; Referee: Yevhen Aranovskyi (Kyiv)

27 September 2014	Karpaty Lviv (PL)	0–1	(PL) Dynamo Kyiv	Lviv
19:30		Report	Teodorczyk 5'	Stadium: Ukraina Stadium; Attendance: 11,200; Referee: Yuriy Vaks (Simferopol)

28 September 2014	Stal Dniprodzerzhynsk (1L)	2–1	(PL) Chornomorets Odesa	Dniprodzerzhynsk, Dnipropetrovsk Oblast
14:00	Kotlyar 24' (pen.), 82' (pen.)	Report	Hai 45'	Stadium: Metalurh Stadium; Attendance: 2,100; Referee: Yuriy Moseichuk (Chernivtsi)

28 September 2014	Olimpik Donetsk (PL)	2–0	(PL) Metalurh Zaporizhya	Kyiv
16:00	Sytnik 7'; Helzin 70' (pen.)	Report		Stadium: Bannikov Stadium; Attendance: 700; Referee: Ivan Bondar (Kyiv)

==== Second leg ====
On 8 October 2014, the Administration of the Premier League approved dates and times for second leg games of the round of 16.

27 October 2014^{(9)}	Shakhtar Donetsk (PL)	4–1	(1L) FC Poltava	Kyiv
15:00	Wellington Nem 9'; Hladkyy 20'; Bernard 23', 38'	Report (more)	Korkishko 51'	Stadium: Bannikov Stadium; Attendance: 800; Referee: Oleksandr Holovkov (Severodonetsk)

Shakhtar won 9–2 on aggregate.

27 October 2014^{(10)}	Dnipro Dnipropetrovsk (PL)	4–0	(PL) Volyn Lutsk	Dnipropetrovsk
19:00	Cheberyachko 37'; Rotan 57'; Seleznyov 72'; Kalinić 87'	Report (more)		Stadium: Dnipro Arena; Attendance: 5,613; Referee: Dmytro Kulakov (Brovary)

Dnipro won 4–1 on aggregate.

28 October 2014	Metalurh Zaporizhya (PL)	0–4	(PL) Olimpik Donetsk	Zaporizhia
17:00		Report	Doroshenko 14'; Kadymyan 24', 43'; Drachenko 90+2'	Stadium: Slavutych Arena; Attendance: 1,500; Referee: Serhiy Dankovskyi (Kyiv)

Olimpik won 6–0 on aggregate.

28 October 2014^{(10)}	Dynamo Kyiv (PL)	1–0	(PL) Karpaty Lviv	Kyiv
19:00	Husyev 90+1'	Report		Stadium: NSC Olimpiyskiy; Attendance: 11,130; Referee: Oleksandr Ivanov (Makiivka)

Dynamo won 2–0 on aggregate.

29 October 2014	Vorskla Poltava (PL)	3–2	(PL) Illichivets Mariupol	Poltava
17:00	Kovpak 46', 65'; Hromov 50'	Report (more)	Totovytskyi 2'; Kulach 30'	Stadium: Butovsky Vorskla Stadium; Attendance: 3,200; Referee: Oleksandr Derdo (Illichivsk)

Vorskla won 4–2 on aggregate.

29 October 2014	Chornomorets Odesa (PL)	2–1 (a.e.t.) (4–2 p)	(1L) Stal Dniprodzerzhynsk	Odesa
19:00	Didenko 40'; Opanasenko 81'	Report	Kotlyar 57'	Stadium: Chornomorets Stadium; Attendance: 8,502; Referee: Yevhen Aranovskyi (Kyiv)
	Penalties
	Hai (penalty scored); Balashov (penalty scored); Nazarenko (penalty scored); Slinkin (penalty scored)		(penalty missed) Adamyuk; (penalty scored) Kulish; (penalty scored) Karasyuk; (penalty missed) Bilyi

3–3 on aggregate. Chornomorets won 4–2 on penalties.

29 October 2014^{(10)}	Metalist Kharkiv (PL)	1–1	(PL) Hoverla Uzhhorod	Kharkiv
19:30	Jajá 39'	Report	Burdujan 80'	Stadium: OSC Metalist; Attendance: 4,560; Referee: Serhiy Lysenchuk (Kyiv)

3–3 on aggregate. Metalist won on away goals.

30 October 2014	Zorya Luhansk (PL)	1–1	(1L) FC Oleksandriya	Zaporizhia
17:00	Segbefia 15'	Report	Imerekov 45'	Stadium: Slavutych Arena; Attendance: 500; Referee: Oleksandr Bilokur (Donetsk)

Zorya won 2–1 on aggregate.

Notes:

^(9) Originally scheduled on 28 October 2014, game Shakhtar – Poltava was moved to earlier date.

^(10) Originally scheduled on 30 October 2014, games Dnipro – Volyn, Dynamo – Karpaty, and Metalist – Hoverla were moved to earlier dates.

=== Quarterfinals ===
In this round enter the eight winners from the previous round. All the teams are from the Premier League. The draw was held at the House of Football in Kyiv on 31 October 2014. The first leg matches were scheduled to be played on 3 December 2014, but due to weather conditions the Premier League has rescheduled the match to the spring pending confirmation by the Football Federation of Ukraine. On 10 February 2015 the Premier League administration approved dates and times of the first leg.

==== First leg ====
4 March 2015	Vorskla Poltava (PL)	0–0	(PL) Olimpik Donetsk	Poltava
15:00		Report		Stadium: Butovsky Vorskla Stadium; Attendance: 1,010; Referee: Konstiantyn Trukhanov

4 March 2015	Zorya Luhansk (PL)	1–2	(PL) Dynamo Kyiv	Zaporizhia
17:00	Kamenyuka 50'	Report	Husyev 12' (pen.); Kravets 21'	Stadium: Slavutych Arena; Attendance: 1,500; Referee: Yuriy Morzharovskyi

4 March 2015	Metalist Kharkiv (PL)	0–2	(PL) Shakhtar Donetsk	Lviv
19:00		Report	Kucher 4'; Hladkyy 54'	Stadium: Arena Lviv; Attendance: 1,712; Referee: Serhiy Berezka

1 April 2015 ^{(11)}	Chornomorets Odesa (PL)	0–4	(PL) Dnipro Dnipropetrovsk	Kyiv
19:00		Report	Rotan 51'; Seleznyov 56' (pen.), 87'; Bezus 90+2'	Stadium: VVL Dynamo Stadium; Attendance: 550; Referee: Yaroslav Kozyk

Notes:

^(11) Originally scheduled on 4 March 2015, game Chornomorets – Dnipro was postponed.

==== Second leg ====
8 April 2015	Olimpik Donetsk (PL)	1–0	(PL) Vorskla Poltava	Kyiv
14:00	Sytnik 57'	Report		Stadium: Bannikov Stadium; Attendance: 700; Referee: Serhiy Berezka

Olimpik won 1–0 on aggregate.

8 April 2015	Dynamo Kyiv (PL)	2–0	(PL) Zorya Luhansk	Kyiv
18:30	Belhanda 33'; Teodorczyk 42'	Report		Stadium: VVL Dynamo Stadium; Attendance: 8,200; Referee: Konstiantyn Trukhanov

Dynamo won 4–1 on aggregate.

8 April 2015	Shakhtar Donetsk (PL)	1–0	(PL) Metalist Kharkiv	Lviv
19:00	Luiz Adriano 49'	Report		Stadium: Arena Lviv; Attendance: 2,253; Referee: Serhiy Lysenchuk

Shakhtar won 3–0 on aggregate.

8 April 2015	Dnipro Dnipropetrovsk (PL)	1–0	(PL) Chornomorets Odesa	Dnipropetrovsk
20:30	Shakhov 28'	Report		Stadium: Meteor Stadium; Attendance: 3,500; Referee: Yuriy Vaks

Dnipro won 5–0 on aggregate.

=== Semifinals ===
In this round enter the four winners from the previous round. All the teams are from the Premier League. The draw was held at the House of Football in Kyiv on 9 April 2015.

==== First leg ====
29 April 2015	Dnipro Dnipropetrovsk (PL)	0–1	(PL) Shakhtar Donetsk	Dnipropetrovsk
19:00		Report	Hladkyy 45+1'	Stadium: Dnipro Arena; Attendance: 20,401; Referee: Yuriy Morzharovskyi

29 April 2015	Olimpik Donetsk (PL)	0–0	(PL) Dynamo Kyiv	Kyiv
20:00		Report		Stadium: VVL Dynamo Stadium; Attendance: 8,500; Referee: Yuriy Vaks

==== Second leg ====
20 May 2015	Dynamo Kyiv (PL)	4–1	(PL) Olimpik Donetsk	Kyiv
19:00	Veloso 4', 53'; Yarmolenko 37'; Lens 90+2'	Report	Dytyatev 76'	Stadium: NSC Olimpiyskiy; Attendance: 11,446; Referee: Vitaliy Romanov

Dynamo won 4–1 on aggregate.

20 May 2015	Shakhtar Donetsk (PL)	1–1	(PL) Dnipro Dnipropetrovsk	Lviv
19:30	Luiz Adriano 77' (pen.)	Report	Kalinić 30'	Stadium: Arena Lviv; Attendance: 15,300; Referee: Anatoliy Abdula

Shakhtar won 2–1 on aggregate.

=== Final ===
4 June 2015	Dynamo Kyiv (PL)	0–0 (5–4 p)	(PL) Shakhtar Donetsk	NSC Olimpiyskiy, Kyiv
21:00		Report		Attendance: 53,455; Referee: Yuriy Mozharovsky (Lviv)
	Penalties
	Veloso (penalty missed); Dragović (penalty scored); Antunes (penalty missed); Husyev (penalty scored); Yarmolenko (penalty scored); Belhanda (penalty scored); Khacheridi (penalty scored)		(penalty scored) Srna; (penalty scored) Luiz Adriano; (penalty scored) Douglas Costa; (penalty missed) Taison; (penalty missed) Rakytskiy; (penalty scored) Teixeira; (penalty missed) Hladkyy

== Top goalscorers ==
The competition's top ten goalscorers including qualification rounds.

Rank	Scorer	Goals (Pen.)	Team
1	(Ukraine) Anton Kotlyar	5 (4)	Stal Dniprodzerzhynsk
2	(Ukraine) Oleksandr Hladkyy	4	Shakhtar Donetsk
2	(Ukraine) Oleksandr Kovpak	4 (1)	Vorskla Poltava
4	(Ukraine) Yevhen Seleznyov	3 (1)	Dnipro Dnipropetrovsk
4	(Brazil) Luiz Adriano	3 (2)	Shakhtar Donetsk

== See also ==
- 2014–15 Ukrainian Premier League
- 2014–15 Ukrainian Premier League Reserves and Under 19
- 2014–15 Ukrainian First League
- 2014–15 Ukrainian Second League
- 2014–15 UEFA Europa League
