= Kirsha =

Kirsha is a unisex given name. Notable people with the name include:

- Kirsha Danilov, 19th century Russian folklorist
- Kirsha Kaechele (born 1976), American contemporary art curator and artist

== See also ==
- Kirsha Training Centre in Donetsk, Ukraine
