= Volodymyr Korolkov =

Ukrainian footballer

Personal information
- Full name: Volodymyr Anatoliyovych Korolkov
- Date of birth: 31 January 1986 (age 40)
- Place of birth: Berezivka, Ukrainian SSR, Soviet Union
- Position: Forward

Youth career
- 1999–2000: Ukrposhta Odesa
- 2000–2001: Chornomorets Odesa
- 2001–2003: Shakhtar Donetsk

Senior career*
Years	Team	Apps	(Gls)
2003–2006	Shakhtar Donetsk	0	(0)
2004–2006	→ Shakhtar-2 Donetsk	4	(0)
2003–2005	→ Shakhtar-3 Donetsk	42	(5)
2007	Ivan Odesa	2	(0)
2008	Olkom Melitopol	13	(4)
2008	Knyazha Shchaslyve	7	(2)
2008	→ Knyazha-2 Shchaslyve	10	(1)
2009–2010	Feniks-Illichovets Kalinine	38	(7)
2011	Real Pharma Odesa	22	(1)
2012	Zhemchuzhyna Yalta	18	(6)
2013–2020	Hirnyk-Sport Horishni Plavni	185	(27)

International career
2001–2002	Ukraine U-17	11	(1)
- * Club domestic league appearances and goals

Volodymyr Korolkov (Ukrainian: Володимир Анатолійович Корольков; born 31 January 1986) is a professional Ukrainian football forward.

Korolkov is a product of couple of the Odesa city football academies including Chornomorets and Ukrposhta as well as FC Shakhtar Donetsk. He became noticeable during the 2014-15 Ukrainian First League season when he scored 8 goals playing for Hirnyk-Sport.
