= 2014–15 Ukrainian First League =

Ukrainian First League
- Season: 2014–15
- Champions: FC Oleksandriya
- Promoted: FC Oleksandriya; Stal Dniprodzerzhynsk
- Relegated: Bukovyna Chernivtsi; ~~Stal Al~~ (withdrew)
- Matches: 226
- Goals: 551 (2.44 per match)
- Top goalscorer: 21 – Stanislav Kulish (Stal Dni.)
- Biggest home win: 5 goals – Desna 6–1 Bukovyna (Round 26)
- Biggest away win: 5 goals – Mykolaiv 0–5 Hirnyk-Sport (Round 14)
- Highest scoring: 8 goals – Nyva 5–3 Bukovyna (ppd. Round 1)
- Longest winning run: 10 – Oleksandriya (Round 1–10)
- Longest unbeaten run: 14 – Oleksandriya (Round 1–11, 13–15)
- Longest winless run: 13 – Bukovyna (Rounds 3–9, ppd. 2, 11, 13, ppd. 1, 14–15)
- Longest losing run: 9 – Bukovyna (Rounds 3–9, ppd. 2, 11)
- Highest attendance: 6,400 – Oleksandriya–Zirka (Round 26)
- Lowest attendance: 200 – Dynamo-2–Stal Alchevsk (Round 2)

The 2014–15 Ukrainian First League was the 24th since its establishment. The competition commenced on 26 July 2014 with seven matches. Due to sponsorship reasons the league is called Favbet League 1. The competition was on winter recess from 17 November until 20 March when the competition resumed with the Round 18 match between FC Ternopil and MFC Mykolaiv.

== Teams ==
The number of teams for the competition was confirmed on 7 July 2014.

=== Promoted teams ===
Four teams were promoted from the 2013–14 Ukrainian Second League.

- Hirnyk-Sport Komsomolsk – champion (debut)
- Stal Dniprodzerzhynsk – 2nd placed runner-up (returning after an absence of 6 seasons)
- FC Ternopil – 3rd placed runner-up (debut)
- Hirnyk Kryvyi Rih – 4th placed runner-up (debut)

=== Relegated teams ===
No teams were relegated from the 2013–14 Ukrainian Premier League. Tavriya Simferopol was to be relegated from the Ukrainian Premier League but the team terminated its existence after the annexation of Crimea by Russia.

=== Withdrawn teams ===
- Tytan Armyansk withdrew from the PFL and later terminated their existence due to the annexation of Crimea.

=== Suspended teams ===
- FC Avanhard Kramatorsk were suspended from the PFL due to the war in Donbas.

=== Merged teams ===
PFC Oleksandriya refused promotion to the Premier League. Prior to the season PFC Oleksandriya and UkrAhroKom Holovkivka merged into one club renaming themselves to FC Oleksandriya.

== Location map ==
The following displays the location of teams.

Home venues of teams in the 2014–15 Ukrainian First League.
Home towns in green are unused this season.
Teams in italics are from a conflict zone due to the war in Donbas and are playing their home games in different cities.

=== Stadiums ===
The following stadiums are considered home grounds for the teams in the competition.

Rank	Stadium	Capacity	Club	Notes
1	Metalurh Stadium, Kryvyi Rih	29,783	Hirnyk Kryvyi Rih	
2	Yuvileiny Stadium, Sumy	25,800	FC Sumy	
3	Lobanovskyi Dynamo Stadium, Kyiv	16,873	Dynamo-2 Kyiv	Used as home ground in Round 9
4	Central City Stadium, Mykolaiv	16,700	MFC Mykolaiv	
5	Zirka Stadium, Kirovohrad	13,667	Zirka Kirovohrad	
6	City Stadium, Ternopil	12,750	Nyva Ternopil	
6	City Stadium, Ternopil	12,750	FC Ternopil	
7	Yuri Gagarin Stadium, Chernihiv	12,060	Desna Chernihiv	
8	Bukovyna Stadium, Chernivtsi	12,000	Bukovyna Chernivtsi	
9	CSC Nika Stadium, Oleksandria	7,000	FC Oleksandriya	
10	Naftovyk Stadium, Okhtyrka	5,256	Naftovyk-Ukrnafta Okhtyrka	
11	Sonyachny Stadium, Kharkiv	4,924	Helios Kharkiv	
12	Metalurh Stadium, Dniprodzerzhynsk	2,900	Stal Dniprodzerzhynsk	
13	Lokomotov Stadium, Poltava	2,500	FC Poltava	
14	Yunist Stadium, Komsomolsk	2,500	Hirnyk-Sport Komsomolsk	
15	Mashynobudivnyk Stadium, Karlivka	1,300	Stal Alchevsk	Used as home ground
16	Dynamo Training Center, Kyiv	1,200	Dynamo-2 Kyiv	

== Managers ==
Club	Coach	Replaced coach
Bukovyna Chernivtsi	(Ukraine) Yuriy Hiy	
Desna Chernihiv	(Ukraine) Oleksandr Ryabokon	
Dynamo-2 Kyiv	(Ukraine) Vadym Yevtushenko	(Belarus) Alyaksandr Khatskevich
Helios Kharkiv	(Ukraine) Serhiy Syzykhin (interim)	(Ukraine) Serhiy Yesin
Hirnyk Kryvyi Rih	(Ukraine) Hennadiy Prykhodko	
Hirnyk-Sport Komsomolsk	(Ukraine) Ihor Zhabchenko	
FC Oleksandriya	(Ukraine) Volodymyr Sharan	
MFC Mykolaiv	(Ukraine) Vyacheslav Mazarati	
Naftovyk-Ukrnafta Okhtyrka	(Ukraine) Vadym Kolesnyk	
Nyva Ternopil	(Ukraine) Roman Tolochko	(Ukraine) Bohdan Samardak
FC Poltava	(Ukraine) Oleh Fedorchuk	(Ukraine) Ilya Blyznyuk
Stal Alchevsk	(Ukraine) Vadym Plotnikov	
Stal Dniprodzerzhynsk	(Ukraine) Volodymyr Mazyar	
FC Sumy	(Ukraine) Yuriy Yaroshenko	
FC Ternopil	(Ukraine) Vasyl Ivehesh	
Zirka Kirovohrad	(Ukraine) Serhiy Lavrynenko	(Ukraine) Anatoliy Buznyk (Ukraine) Samir Hasanov

=== Managerial changes ===
Team	Outgoing head coach	Manner of departure	Date of vacancy	Table	Incoming head coach	Date of appointment
FC Sumy	(Ukraine) Serhiy Strashnenko (interim)	End interim		Pre-season	(Ukraine) Yuriy Yaroshenko	
Zirka Kirovohrad	(Ukraine) Anatoliy Buznyk	Fired	October 28	11th	(Ukraine) Samir Hasanov	October 28
Zirka Kirovohrad	(Ukraine) Samir Hasanov	Resigns	November 12	14th	(Ukraine) Serhiy Lavrynenko	November 12
Dynamo-2 Kyiv	(Belarus) Alyaksandr Khatskevich	Leaves for Belarus	December 4	5th	(Ukraine) Vadym Yevtushenko	December 15
FC Poltava	(Ukraine) Ilya Blyznyuk		January 11	7th	(Ukraine) Oleh Fedorchuk	January 11
Helios Kharkiv	(Ukraine) Serhiy Yesin	Fired	April 1		(Ukraine) Serhiy Syzykhin (interim)	April 1
Nyva Ternopil	(Ukraine) Bohdan Samardak	Resigns	April 27	13th	(Ukraine) Roman Tolochko	April 30

== League table ==
Pos	Team	Pld	W	D	L	GF	GA	GD	Pts	Promotion, qualification or relegation
1	FC Oleksandriya (C, P)	30	22	6	2	53	15	+38	72	Promoted to Ukrainian Premier League
2	Stal Dniprodzerzhynsk (Note: After the season completed the president of FC Stal Dniprodzerzhynsk announced that the club would merge with FC Metalurh Donetsk and were to replace them in the Premier League for the 2015–16 season. (14 June 2015) Initially, the club name attempted to use the name of FC Metalurh Donetsk but subsequently that club declared bankruptcy. Stal Dniprodzerzhynsk was promoted on decision of the Ukrainian Football Federation.) (P)	30	17	9	4	45	21	+24	60	Promoted to Ukrainian Premier League
3	Hirnyk-Sport Komsomolsk	30	16	9	5	44	24	+20	57	
4	Zirka Kirovohrad	30	14	7	9	42	27	+15	49	
5	Desna Chernihiv	30	12	11	7	44	27	+17	47	
6	Dynamo-2 Kyiv	30	12	8	10	35	29	+6	44	
7	Helios Kharkiv	30	12	8	10	30	25	+5	44	
8	FC Sumy	30	12	7	11	35	41	−6	43	
9	Hirnyk Kryvyi Rih	30	10	12	8	32	26	+6	42	
10	FC Poltava	30	11	9	10	29	27	+2	42	
11	FC Ternopil	30	11	8	11	33	49	−16	41	
12	Naftovyk-Ukrnafta Okhtyrka	30	10	10	10	32	34	−2	40	
13	Nyva Ternopil	30	8	3	19	25	52	−27	27	
14	MFC Mykolaiv (O)	30	6	6	18	34	67	−33	24	Qualification to relegation play-offs
15	Stal Alchevsk (D)	30	5	0	25	16	28	−12	15	Withdrew (Note: Stal Alchevsk temporarily withdrew from the competition during the winter break due to the war in Donbas with expectation to return possibly for the next season.)
16	Bukovyna Chernivtsi (R)	30	4	3	23	24	61	−37	15	Relegated to Ukrainian Second League

Source: (in Ukrainian) Professional Football League of Ukraine
Rules for classification: 1) points 2) goal difference 3) goals scored
4) head-to-head points 5) head-to-head goal difference 6) head-to-head goals scored
7) head-to-head fair play (all games) 8) draw or playoff
(C) Champions; (D) Disqualified; (O) Play-off winners; (P) Promoted; (R) Relegated

=== Results ===
As of 24 May 2015

Home \ Away	BUK	DES	DK2	HEL	HIR	HIS	MYK	NAF	NVT	OLK	POL	STA	STD	SUM	TNP	ZIR
Bukovyna Chernivtsi		0–2	1–1	0–1	0–1	0–1	1–3 (Note: Round 2 match between Bukovyna Chernivtsi and MFK Mykolaiv postponed to a later date due to Bukovyna's lack of sponsorship and preparedness in starting to compete in the season. Match was played after Round 9.)	1–4	2–0	1–1	0–1	0–1	0–1	4–1	1–2	0–4
Desna Chernihiv	6–1		2–1	1–1	0–0	4–0	4–1	2–1	2–0	3–1	1–1	0–1	4–2	1–1	0–0	0–1
Dynamo-2 Kyiv	2–0	1–1		4–0	2–3	1–4	3–1	2–0	2–0	0–1	2–0	4–1	0–0	2–1	1–0	1–2
Helios Kharkiv	3–0 (Note: Administration of Bukovyna Chernivtsi informed that the club would not travel to their Round 12 match against Helios Kharkiv, indicating that the club was in difficult financial state and would not travel to the match. Control Disciplinary Committee of the Football Federation of Ukraine awarded a 3–0 technical victory to Helios. (24 October 2014))	1–1	0–1		1–1	0–0	2–2	2–0	0–1	1–3	1–2	+:-	1–2	0–1	1–0	1–0
Hirnyk Kryvyi Rih	1–0	0–0	0–0	1–0		0–1	3–1	1–1	4–0	0–2	0–0	1–2	0–1	0–2	0–0	1–2
Hirnyk-Sport Komsomolsk	2–1	4–1	1–1 (Note: Dynamo-2 Kyiv postpones their Round 19 match away against Hirnyk-Sport Komsomolsk since five players were called for international duty. Match played after Round 27.)	0–0	0–0		2–1	2–1	0–1	0–0	2–1	2–1	0–1	3–0	4–0	1–1
MFC Mykolaiv	0–4	3–2	0–0	1–2	3–2	0–5		1–2	0–2	1–4	2–4	1–0	1–2	3–3	1–3	0–1
Naftovyk-Ukrnafta Okhtyrka	1–0	1–0	0–0	1–1	1–1	0–3	0–0		2–1	2–1	1–1	+:-	0–0	3–3	2–1	2–0
Nyva Ternopil	5–3 (Note: Round 1 match between Bukovyna Chernivtsi and Nyva Ternopil postponed to a later date due to Nyva's lack of sponsorship and the team not ready to start playing. The match was played after Round 13. (22 October 2014))	0–2	1–2	0–2	0–2	1–3	3–1	1–1		0–1	0–1	+:-	1–5	2–0	2–2	0–2
FC Oleksandriya	4–1	2–1	4–0 (Note: Dynamo-2 Kyiv postpones their Round 12 away match against FC Oleksandriya since several players were called for international duty. Match played after Round 20.)	1–0	1–1	3–0	4–0	2–1	3–0		2–1	1–0	0–0	2–0	4–0	2–1
FC Poltava	2–0	0–0	1–0	0–2	1–2	0–1	3–3	1–0	3–0	0–1		+:-	3–2	0–1	0–0	0–0
Stal Alchevsk	-:+	-:+	0–1	0–2	-:+	-:+	-:+	1–2	1–2	-:+	1–2		0–2	1–2	-:+	3–1
Stal Dniprodzerzhynsk	4–1 (Note: Round 10 match between Stal Dniprodzerzhynsk and Bukovyna postponed to a later date due to Stal Dniprodzerzhinsk's participation in the 1/8 Round of the 2014–15 Ukrainian Cup. Match played after Round 16.)	1–0	1–0	0–1	1–1	0–0	1–1	3–2	2–0	1–1	0–0	+:-		3–0	4–0	2–1
PFC Sumy	2–0	1–1	1–1	1–4	2–1	1–1	1–0	1–1	1–0	0–1	1–0	+:-	0–2		5–1	1–0
FC Ternopil	1–1	1–1	1–0	1–0	0–3	2–2	4–2	1–0	2–2 (Note: Round 2 match between FC Ternopil and Nyva Ternopil postponed to a later date due to Nyva's unpreparedness for the season. Match was played after Round 7.)	0–1	1–0	3–0	2–1	3–2		1–4
Zirka Kirovohrad	4–1	0–2	2–0	0–0	2–2	2–0	0–1	1–0	1–0	0–0	1–1	2–3	1–1	1–0	5–1	

Source: Calendar (in Ukrainian)
Legend: Blue = home team win; Yellow = draw; Red = away team win.

=== Position by round ===
Team ╲ Round	1	2	3	4	5	6	7	8	9	10	11	12	13	14	15	16	17	18	19	20	21	22	23	24	25	26	27	28	29	30
FC Oleksandriya	4	2	1	1	1	1	1	1	1	1	1	1	1	1	1	1	1	1	1	2	1	1	1	1	1	1	1	1	1	1
Stal Dniprodzerzhynsk	3	4	2	3	3	3	2	2	2	2	2	3	2	2	2	2	2	2	2	1	2	2	2	2	2	2	2	2	2	2
Hirnyk-Sport Komsomolsk	5	1	3	2	2	2	4	4	5	6	5	2	4	3	3	3	3	3	3	3	3	3	3	3	3	3	3	3	3	3
Zirka Kirovohrad	14	12	11	13	10	8	5	7	8	12	10	11	13	11	13	14	14	11	10	9	8	6	7	5	6	8	6	5	5	4
Desna Chernihiv	12	10	10	8	8	10	10	8	7	5	4	5	6	9	9	6	6	7	5	5	5	5	5	6	7	5	5	4	4	5
Dynamo-2 Kyiv	8	3	6	10	12	11	9	12	11	13	11	12	11	12	10	9	5	5	6	6	6	7	6	7	8	6	7	6	7	6
Helios Kharkiv	2	5	4	5	4	4	3	3	4	3	6	6	7	6	7	7	9	10	12	12	11	10	8	10	11	9	8	8	6	7
PFC Sumy	15	13	13	14	14	13	14	13	9	7	8	8	9	8	8	10	10	9	9	10	10	9	10	9	5	7	9	9	10	8
Hirnyk Kryvyi Rih	9	7	9	9	11	14	13	11	14	14	14	14	14	14	14	11	11	12	11	11	12	12	12	11	10	11	10	12	11	9
FC Poltava	13	11	8	6	6	6	6	6	6	8	9	9	8	7	5	8	7	8	7	8	7	8	11	12	12	12	12	11	8	10
FC Ternopil	6	8	7	4	5	5	7	5	3	4	3	4	3	5	4	4	4	4	4	4	4	4	4	4	4	4	4	7	9	11
Naftovyk-Ukrnafta Okhtyrka	16	16	16	11	13	12	12	9	10	9	7	7	5	4	6	5	8	6	8	7	9	11	9	8	9	10	11	10	12	12
Nyva Ternopil	11	15	15	16	16	16	15	15	15	15	15	15	12	10	12	13	13	14	14	13	13	13	13	13	13	13	13	13	13	13
MFC Mykolaiv	7	9	12	12	9	9	11	14	12	10	12	10	10	13	11	12	12	13	13	14	14	14	14	14	14	14	14	14	14	14
Stal Alchevsk	1	6	5	7	7	7	8	10	13	11	13	13	15	15	15	15	15	15	15	15	15	15	15	15	15	15	15	15	15	15
Bukovyna Chernivtsi	10	14	14	15	15	15	16	16	16	16	16	16	16	16	16	16	16	16	16	16	16	16	16	16	16	16	16	16	16	16

Updated to match(es) played on 3 June 2015. Source: pfl.ua

== Promotion/relegation play-off ==
A promotion/relegation home and away play-off is to be played by the 3rd place team of 2014–15 Ukrainian Second League against the 14th placed team of the 2014–15 Ukrainian First League competition. Seedings for the playoff were announced in Ukrainian House of Football on May 29.

Team 1	Agg.	Team 2	1st leg	2nd leg
MFC Mykolaiv	1–0	FC Kremin Kremenchuk	0–0	1–0

=== First leg ===
7 June 2015
18:00

MFC Mykolaiv	0 – 0	Kremin Kremenchuk
	Report

Tsentralnyi Stadion, Mykolaiv
Attendance: 1,200
Referee: Vadym Saik

=== Second leg ===
11 June 2015
18:00

Kremin Kremenchuk	0 – 1	MFC Mykolaiv
	Report	Storublevtsev 62'

Oleh Babayev Kremin Arena, Kremenchuk
Attendance: 1,500
Referee: Mykola Balakyn

MFC Mykolaiv wins 1–0 on aggregate and remains in First League

== Top goalscorers ==
As of 3 June 2015

#	Scorer	Goals (Pen.)	Team
1	(Ukraine) Stanislav Kulish	21	Stal Dniprodzerzhynsk
2	(Ukraine) Bohdan Semenets	14	FC Ternopil
3	(Ukraine) Oleksiy Chychykov	11	Zirka Kirovohrad
4	(Ukraine) Dmytro Bohachov	10	FC Sumy
4	(Ukraine) Vitaliy Ponomar	10	FC Oleksandriya
6	(Ukraine) Serhiy Herasymets	9	Hirnyk-Sport Komsomolsk
6	(Ukraine) Serhiy Kravchenko	9 (3)	Helios Kharkiv
8	(Ukraine) Volodymyr Korolkov	8 (3)	Hirnyk-Sport Komsomolsk
8	(Ukraine) Anton Kotlyar	8 (6)	Stal Dniprodzerzhynsk
10	(Ukraine) Maksym Kalenchuk	7	Stal Dniprodzerzhynsk
10	(Ukraine) Yehor Kartushov	7	Desna Chernihiv
10	(Ukraine) Oleksiy Khoblenko	7	Dynamo-2 Kyiv
10	(Ukraine) Roman Loktionov (Note: Roman Loktionov signed with Zirka Kirovohrad during the winter break.)	7	Stal Alchevsk / Zirka Kirovohrad
10	(Ukraine) Ihor Zahalskyi	7 (2)	Zirka Kirovohrad
10	(Ukraine) Petro Kondratyuk	7 (3)	Desna Chernihiv
10	(Ukraine) Yuriy Solomka	7 (3)	FC Poltava

== See also ==
- 2014–15 Ukrainian Premier League
- 2014–15 Ukrainian Premier League Reserves and Under 19
- 2014–15 Ukrainian Second League
- 2014–15 Ukrainian Cup
