= 2014–15 Ukrainian Second League =

Ukrainian Second League
- Season: 2014–15
- Country: Ukraine
- Teams: 10
- Champions: Cherkaskyi Dnipro
- Promoted: Cherkaskyi Dnipro; Obolon-Brovar Kyiv
- Relegated: ~~Shakhtar-3 Donetsk~~ (withdrew)
- Matches: 135
- Goals: 359 (2.66 per match)
- Top goalscorer: 18 – Oleksandr Batalskyi (Dnipro)
- Biggest home win: 5 – Dnipro 5–0 Arsenal-Kyivshchyna (Round 12)
- Biggest away win: 5 – Makiyivvuhillya 0–5 Real Pharma (Round 15)
- Highest scoring: 7 goals – Enerhiya 2–5 Kremin (Round 14); Arsenal-Kyivshchyna 2–5 Kremin (Round 15); Skala 2–5 Shakhtar-3 (Round 17)
- Longest winning run: 9 – Obolon-Brovar (Round 7–15)
- Longest unbeaten run: 20 – Dnipro (Round 8–27)
- Longest losing run: 9 – Enerhiya (Round 19–27)
- Highest attendance: 4,250 – Dnipro–Obolon-Brovar (Round 20)
- Lowest attendance: 7 – Makiyivvuhillya–Real Pharma (Round 15)

The 2014–15 Ukrainian Second League was the 24th season of 3rd level professional football in Ukraine. The competition commenced 25 July 2014 when Arsenal-Kyivshchyna Bila Tserkva hosted Shakhtar-3 Donetsk in Bila Tserkva. The competition resumed from the winter break with the postponed Round 16 match between Skala Stryi and NPHU-Makiyivvuhillya Nikopol on 21 March 2015.

== Competition format ==
Ten teams are competing in three stages of round-robin tournament. All teams will play each other in regular format with the first 16 rounds are scheduled for the fall of 2014, while the rest two are planned for the spring of 2015. The draw of the third stage will be based on results of the first two.

== Team changes ==
=== Admitted teams ===
- No teams were admitted by the PFL after playing in the 2014 Ukrainian Football Amateur League and passing attestation.
  - FC Zorya Bilozirya that finished at the final group stage submitted a license prior to the season but merged with FC Slavutych Cherkasy (already playing in the Second League). The club was renamed to FC Cherkaskyi Dnipro.

=== Relegated teams ===
- No teams were relegated from the Ukrainian First League from the previous season.

=== Suspended teams ===
- Shakhtar Sverdlovsk were suspended from the PFL before the start of the 2014–15 season due to the Russo-Ukrainian War.

=== Withdrawn teams ===
- FC Karlivka failed to submit a license and withdrew from the PFL.

=== Location map ===
The following displays the location of teams.

Home venues of teams in the 2014–15 Ukrainian Second League.
Home towns in green are unused this season.
Teams in italics are from a conflict zone due to the Russo-Ukrainian War and are playing their home games in different cities.

== League table ==
Pos	Team	Pld	W	D	L	GF	GA	GD	Pts	Promotion, qualification or relegation
1	Cherkaskyi Dnipro (C, P)	27	20	5	2	54	12	+42	65	Promoted to Ukrainian First League
2	Obolon-Brovar Kyiv (P)	27	20	4	3	47	19	+28	64	Promoted to Ukrainian First League
3	Kremin Kremenchuk (Q)	27	14	6	7	50	30	+20	48	Qualification for promotion play-off
4	Real Pharma Ovidiopol	27	11	9	7	40	29	+11	42	
5	Skala Stryi	27	11	5	11	29	34	−5	38	
6	Krystal Kherson	27	10	6	11	39	37	+2	36	
7	Shakhtar-3 Donetsk	27	8	6	13	38	44	−6	30	Withdrew (Note: After the season completed, the General Director of FC Shakhtar Donetsk Serhiy Palkin confirmed the club's decision on the discontinuation of Shakhtar-3 Donetsk existence. (3 June 2015))
8	NPHU-Makiyivvuhillya Nikopol (Note: Makiyivvuhillya Makiyivka changed their name during the winter break to NPHU-Makiyivvuhillya and are based Nikopol continuing to play their home games at Sport Training Base - Kolos in the village of Chkalovo in Nikopol Raion)	27	5	6	16	23	45	−22	21	Reorganized (Note: At the 2015 PFL Conference it was decided that NPHU-Makiyivvuhillya withdrew from the league and were replaced with FC Nikopol-NPHU.)
9	Arsenal-Kyivshchyna Bila Tserkva	27	6	2	19	14	40	−26	20	
10	Enerhiya Nova Kakhovka	27	4	3	20	25	69	−44	15	

Source: (in Ukrainian) Professional Football League of Ukraine
Rules for classification: 1) points 2) goal difference 3) goals scored 4) head-to-head points 5) head-to-head goal difference 6) head-to-head goals scored 7) head-to-head fair play (all games) 8) draw or playoff
(C) Champions; (P) Promoted; (Q) Qualified for the phase indicated

=== Results ===
As of 3 June 2015

Home \ Away	AKB	CHD	ENK	KRE	KRK	MKM	OBK	RPO	SH3	SKS	AKB	CHD	ENK	KRE	KRK	MKM	OBK	RPO	SH3	SKS
Arsenal-Kyivschyna Bila Tserkva		0–0	2–0	0–5	1–0	1–0	0–1	1–2	1–0	1–2			2–1				0–1	0–1		0–0
Cherkaskyi Dnipro	5–0		3–1	1–0	3–1	3–0	1–1	1–1	2–0	4–1	2–0					4–0	2–1	1–0		1–0
Enerhiya Nova Kakhovka	2–1	0–2		2–5	1–0	0–0	1–0	2–2	1–4	2–1		0–3		0–2	1–4				0–3	
Kremin Kremenchuk	3–0	0–2	4–2		2–0	2–0	1–1 (Note: Round 1 match between Kremin Kremenchuk and Obolon-Brovar Kyiv postponed to a later date due to the untimely death of Kremen Kremenchuk's club President and Mayor of Kremenchuk, Oleh Babayev. The match was played after Round 16.)	1–0	1–2	3–1	2–0	1–1				2–1		0–0		0–1
Krystal Kherson	1–0	1–1	4–2	0–2		3–3	2–1	2–0	3–2	1–1	2–0	1–2		1–3		2–1				1–2
Makiyivvuhillya Makiyivka (Note: Makiyivvuhillya Makiyivka played their home games at Sport Training Base - Kolos in the village of Chkalovo in Nikopol Raion due to the Russo-Ukrainian War.)	1–2	0–2	3–1	0–2	0–0		1–2	0–5	0–0	0–1	2–0		5–1						1–1	2–1
Obolon-Brovar Kyiv	2–0	1–0	5–1	2–1	2–1	3–0		0–0	1–0	1–0			3–0	3–1	2–1	2–0			1–0	
Real Pharma Odesa (Note: Real Pharma Ovidiopol played their home games at Ivan Stadium in Odesa while their home ground, Viktor Dukov Stadium in Ovidiopol is under construction.)	1–0	0–2	2–1	2–2	2–2	2–0	2–3		4–1	2–1			3–0		2–1	0–0	1–2		3–3	
Shakhtar-3 Donetsk (Note: Shakhtar-3 Donetsk played the home games at Mashynobudivnyk Stadium in Karlivka, Poltava Oblast due to the Russo-Ukrainian War.)	1–0	1–4	3–2	2–2	0–2	2–3	2–2	1–1		5–2	2–0	0–2		2–1	0–2					
Skala Stryi	1–0	1–0	0–0	2–2	1–1	1–0 (Note: On petition of Makiyivvuhillya Makiyivka due to the club's difficult financial situation and agreement of the Skala Stryi, the Professional Football League of Ukraine postponed the game of 16th round. Match rescheduled to 21 March to before the start of the Spring half of the competition.)	0–2	0–2	2–1				3–1				1–2	2–0	1–0	

Updated to match(es) played on 3 June 2015. Source: PFL Druha League calendar (in Ukrainian)
Legend: Blue = home team win; Yellow = draw; Red = away team win.

=== Round by round ===
The following table represents the teams position after each round in the competition.

Team ╲ Round	1	2	3	4	5	6	7	8	9	10	11	12	13	14	15	16	17	18	19	20	21	22	23	24	25	26	27
Cherkaskyi Dnipro	10	6	4	2	1	1	2	2	2	1	1	1	2	2	2	2	1	1	1	1	1	1	1	1	1	1	1
Obolon-Brovar Kyiv	7	3	6	4	5	6	6	4	3	2	2	2	1	1	1	1	2	2	2	2	2	2	2	2	2	2	2
Kremin Kremenchuk	6	9	8	7	6	4	1	1	1	3	5	4	4	3	3	3	3	3	3	3	3	3	3	3	3	3	3
Real Pharma Odesa	1	1	2	1	3	2	3	5	6	5	4	3	3	4	4	4	4	4	4	4	4	4	4	4	4	4	4
Skala Stryi	3	4	3	5	4	5	4	3	4	6	6	6	6	6	6	6	6	6	5	6	6	6	6	6	6	5	5
Krystal Kherson	4	2	1	3	2	3	5	6	5	4	3	5	5	5	5	5	5	5	6	5	5	5	5	5	5	6	6
Shakhtar-3 Donetsk	9	10	10	6	7	7	8	8	8	8	8	8	7	7	7	7	7	7	7	7	7	7	7	7	7	7	7
Makiyivvuhillya Makiyivka	5	7	7	9	9	10	10	10	10	10	9	9	9	9	9	10	10	10	10	10	10	10	10	9	9	8	8
Arsenal-Kyivschyna Bila Tserkva	2	5	5	8	8	9	7	7	7	7	7	7	8	8	8	8	8	8	8	8	8	8	8	8	8	9	9
Enerhiya Nova Kakhovka	8	8	9	10	10	8	9	9	9	9	10	10	10	10	10	9	9	9	9	9	9	9	9	10	10	10	10

Updated to match(es) played on 3 June 2015. Source: pfl.ua

== Promotion/relegation play-off ==
A promotion/relegation home and away play-off is to be played by the 3rd place team of 2014–15 Ukrainian Second League against the 14th placed team of the 2014–15 Ukrainian First League competition. Seedings for the playoff were announced in Ukrainian House of Football on May 29.

=== First leg ===
7 June 2015
18:00

MFC Mykolaiv	0 – 0	Kremin Kremenchuk
	Report

Tsentralnyi Stadion, Mykolaiv
Attendance: 1,200
Referee: Vadym Saik

=== Second leg ===
11 June 2015
18:00

Kremin Kremenchuk	0 – 1	MFC Mykolaiv
	Report	Storublevtsev 62'

Oleh Babayev Kremin Arena, Kremenchuk
Attendance: 1,500
Referee: Mykola Balakyn

Kremin Kremenchuk loses 1–0 on aggregate and remains in Second League

== Top goalscorers ==
As of 30 May 2015

Rank	Scorer	Goals (Pen.)	Team
1	(Ukraine) Oleksandr Batalskyi	18	Cherkaskyi Dnipro
2	(Ukraine) Vasyl Tsyutsyura	13 (2)	Skala Stryi
3	(Ukraine) Vasyl Prodan	12	Obolon-Brovar Kyiv
4	(Ukraine) Artem Favorov	11 (6)	Obolon-Brovar Kyiv
5	(Ukraine) Serhiy Borzenko	9	Kremin Kremenchuk
5	(Ukraine) Yehor Ivanov	9 (3)	Kremin Kremenchuk

== See also ==
- 2014–15 Ukrainian Premier League
- 2014–15 Ukrainian Premier League Reserves and Under 19
- 2014–15 Ukrainian First League
- 2014–15 Ukrainian Cup
