= Ihor Dybchenko =

Ukrainian footballer and coach (1960–2022)

Personal information
- Full name: Ihor Vasyliovych Dybchenko
- Date of birth: 15 July 1960
- Place of birth: Stalino, Ukrainian SSR, USSR
- Date of death: 11 April 2022 (aged 61)
- Height: 1.79 m (5 ft 10 in)
- Position: Midfielder

Youth career
- 197?–1978: Shakhtar Donetsk

Senior career*
Years	Team	Apps	(Gls)
1981–1986	Shakhtar Donetsk	30	(4)
1986	Tavriya Simferopol	8	(0)
1987–1988	Shakhtar Horlivka	89	(8)
1989–1990	Shakhtar Snizhne (amateurs)	?	(?)
1990	Kryvbas Kryvyi Rih	35	(0)
1991	Harant Donetsk (amateurs)	?	(?)
1992	Kanatnyk Khartsyzk	12	(2)
1992–1995	Pivdenstal Yenakiieve	51	(6)

Managerial career
- 2002–2005: Shakhtar-3 Donetsk (assistant)
- 2005–2006: Shakhtar-3 Donetsk
- * Club domestic league appearances and goals

Ihor Dybchenko (Ukrainian: Ігор Васильович Дибченко; 15 July 1960 – 11 April 2022) was a Ukrainian professional football player and coach who played as a midfielder.

== Career ==
Born in Donetsk, Dybchenko was a product of the local Shakhtar Donetsk youth sportive school system. On 23 July 1981, he made a professional debut for his club in the match against Dnipro Dniproperovsk.

His football career also included other Ukrainian clubs, mainly from Donbas region.

After retirement from playing career, Dybchenko was appointed president of Shakhtar's women's team (1994–1996). He also worked as a coach (1996–2000) and coached Shakhtar-2 and Shakhtar-3. For more than ten years he headed the selection service at the main club of Shakhtar Donetsk.

== Honours ==
Shakhtar Donetsk

- Soviet Football Cup 1983; runner-up 1984–85, 1985–86
