= Vitorino Antunes =

Portuguese footballer (born 1987)

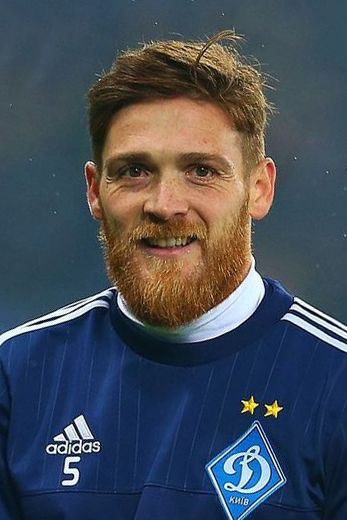
- Antunes with Dynamo Kyiv in 2015

Personal information
- Full name: Vitorino Gabriel Pacheco Antunes
- Date of birth: 1 April 1987 (age 39)
- Place of birth: Freamunde, Portugal
- Height: 1.76 m (5 ft 9 in)
- Position: Left-back

Youth career
- 1996–2004: Freamunde

Senior career*
| Years | Team | Apps | (Gls) |
| 2004–2006 | Freamunde | 44 | (0) |
| 2006–2008 | Paços Ferreira | 25 | (3) |
| 2007–2008 | → Roma (loan) | 5 | (0) |
| 2008–2012 | Roma | 0 | (0) |
| 2008–2009 | → Lecce (loan) | 10 | (0) |
| 2010 | → Leixões (loan) | 11 | (0) |
| 2011 | → Livorno (loan) | 6 | (0) |
| 2012 | → Panionios (loan) | 10 | (1) |
| 2012–2013 | Paços Ferreira | 14 | (3) |
| 2013 | → Málaga (loan) | 11 | (1) |
| 2013–2015 | Málaga | 51 | (1) |
| 2015–2018 | Dynamo Kyiv | 49 | (3) |
| 2017–2018 | → Getafe (loan) | 34 | (0) |
| 2018–2020 | Getafe | 29 | (1) |
| 2020–2021 | Sporting CP | 8 | (0) |
| 2021–2025 | Paços Ferreira | 115 | (10) |
| Total | | 422 | (23) |

International career
| 2005 | Portugal U18 | 3 | (1) |
| 2005–2006 | Portugal U19 | 16 | (2) |
| 2006–2007 | Portugal U20 | 8 | (3) |
| 2007–2008 | Portugal U21 | 14 | (0) |
| 2009 | Portugal U23 | 1 | (0) |
| 2007–2017 | Portugal | 13 | (1) |
- * Club domestic league appearances and goals

Vitorino Gabriel Pacheco Antunes (Portuguese pronunciation: [vituˈɾinu ɐ̃ˈtunɨʃ]; born 1 April 1987) is a Portuguese former professional footballer who played as a left-back.

He spent most of his career abroad, winning several items of silverware with Dynamo Kyiv in Ukraine, and making 125 La Liga appearances for Málaga and Getafe. Domestically, he had three spells at Paços de Ferreira and won the Primeira Liga with Sporting CP in 2020–21.

Antunes earned 41 caps for Portugal at youth level, and was used sparingly as a senior international for over a decade.

== Club career ==
=== Early years and Paços ===
Born in Freamunde, Antunes joined Primeira Liga club Paços de Ferreira for the 2006–07 season for an undisclosed fee from third division side Freamunde, where he began his professional career.

At Paços, he was instrumental in the team's first ever qualification to the UEFA Cup, also scoring in a 1–1 home draw against Porto.

=== Roma ===
After a season of excellent displays, Antunes was linked with moves to Porto, Benfica, Sporting CP, Atlético Madrid, Auxerre, Aston Villa and Anderlecht. On 29 August 2007, just two days before the close of the transfer window, Italian club Roma obtained the player on a loan deal for €300,000, with the option to buy him permanently open until 15 April 2008. He signed a 1+3-year-contract for €195,000 in the first season – in gross, bonus excluded – gradually increased to €321,000 in the last year.

Antunes made his official Roma debut on 12 December 2007, during the campaign's UEFA Champions League game against Manchester United. He was chosen as Player of the match in a poll conducted by the former's official website.

On 20 January 2008, Antunes played his first Serie A match, coming on as a 77th-minute substitute in a 2–0 home win over Catania. He also started against the same opponent in the semi-finals of the Coppa Italia in April, which ended with another victory at the Stadio Olimpico (1–0), but was, however, virtually absent in the league, being barred by Italian internationals Marco Cassetti and Max Tonetto and totalling only 65 minutes of action.

On 2 April 2008, Roma exercised their right to full ownership, paying Paços de Ferreira the sum of €1.2 million whilst the player signed a five-year contract. He was immediately loaned to newly promoted Lecce in a season-long move, for €200,000.

After appearing rarely for Lecce and not at all for Roma from August to December 2009, Antunes returned to Portugal the following month, being loaned to struggling Leixões until the end of the campaign, which ended in top-flight relegation.

On 5 February 2010, the FIFA Dispute Resolution Chamber ruled Freamunde eligible to receive €45,000 for Solidarity Contribution. On 31 January 2011, Antunes was signed by Livorno along with teammate Marco D'Alessandro on loan, with Roma paying the player an incentive of €270,000 in order to compensate the wage difference between the two clubs.

=== Paços return and Málaga ===
On 28 June 2012, after spending five months loaned to Panionios in Greece, Antunes was released by Roma and signed a three-year contract with former side Paços de Ferreira, replacing Benfica-bound Luisinho. Late into the following winter transfer window, however, he was loaned to Málaga as a replacement for Arsenal-bound Nacho Monreal. He made his La Liga debut on 9 February, playing the full 90 minutes in a 2–1 away win against Levante, and participated in 15 official games during the season, including four in the Champions League.

Antunes signed a four-year deal with Málaga on 11 June 2013, for a fee of €1.25 million.

=== Dynamo Kyiv ===
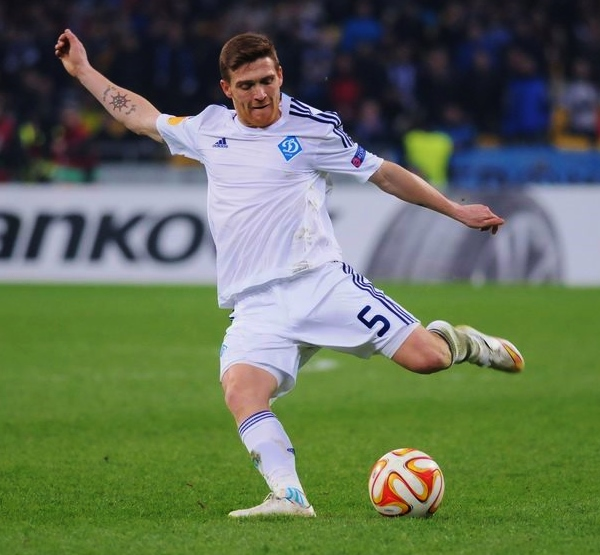
Antunes playing for Dynamo Kyiv in March 2015

On 2 February 2015, Antunes made a deadline day move to Ukrainian Premier League club Dynamo Kyiv for a reported fee of around €6 million, signing a four-and-a-half-year contract. He made his debut on the 19th, playing the full 90 minutes in a 1–2 away loss to Guingamp for the Europa League where his new team played with nine men for 45 minutes, and scored his first goal on 15 March, helping to a 5–0 home victory over Illichivets Mariupol. His second came four days later, as he struck a powerful shot from 30 yards in a 5–2 win against Everton that qualified for the quarter-finals of the Europa League 6–4 on aggregate.

=== Getafe ===
On 21 July 2017, Antunes was loaned to Getafe for one year with a buyout clause. At the end of the season, it was activated and the player signed a two-year contract.

On 21 May 2019, Antunes was voted into the La Liga Team of the Season. The previous month, however, he had suffered an anterior cruciate ligament injury to his right knee which would sideline him for a lengthy period of time.

=== Return to Portugal ===
After his Getafe contract expired, the 33-year-old Antunes returned to Portugal and signed for Sporting on 15 August 2020, ending seven years abroad. He made 13 total appearances in his only season, winning his first league title and the Taça da Liga.

Antunes then released himself from his contract at the Estádio José Alvalade and joined Paços de Ferreira on a two-year deal.

== International career ==
Antunes represented Portugal at the 2007 FIFA U-20 World Cup in Canada, playing all the games in an eventual round-of-16 exit and scoring in a 1–2 group stage loss against Mexico. On 5 June 2007, aged 20, he earned his first cap for the senior team, appearing in a 1–1 draw away against Kuwait after replacing Paulo Ferreira for the last half-hour of the match.

Antunes passed five years and four days between his third cap and his next, in September 2013. On 10 October 2017, he played 22 minutes in the decisive 2–0 home win over Switzerland for the 2018 FIFA World Cup qualifiers to help the nation top its group, and he scored his first goal on 14 November of that year in a 1–1 friendly draw with the United States. He was then included in a preliminary 35-man squad for the finals in Russia, but did not make the final cut.

== Career statistics ==
=== Club ===
As of 3 July 2018

| Club | Season | League | | Cup | | League Cup | | Europe | | Other (Note: Includes Ukrainian Super Cup) | | Total | |
| Club | Season | Apps | Goals | Apps | Goals | Apps | Goals | Apps | Goals | Apps | Goals | Apps | Goals |
|---|---|---|---|---|---|---|---|---|---|---|---|---|---|
| Freamunde | 2004–05 | 22 | 0 | 1 | 0 | — | | — | | — | | 23 | 0 |
| Freamunde | 2005–06 | 22 | 0 | 2 | 0 | — | | — | | — | | 24 | 0 |
| Freamunde | Total | 44 | 0 | 3 | 0 | — | | — | | — | | 47 | 0 |
| Paços Ferreira | 2006–07 | 23 | 2 | 1 | 0 | — | | — | | — | | 24 | 2 |
| Paços Ferreira | 2007–08 | 2 | 0 | 0 | 0 | 0 | 0 | — | | — | | 2 | 0 |
| Paços Ferreira | Total | 25 | 2 | 1 | 0 | 0 | 0 | — | | — | | 26 | 2 |
| Roma (loan) | 2007–08 | 5 | 0 | 3 | 0 | — | | 1 | 0 | — | | 9 | 0 |
| Roma | 2009–10 | 0 | 0 | 0 | 0 | — | | 0 | 0 | — | | 0 | 0 |
| Roma | 2010–11 | 0 | 0 | 0 | 0 | — | | 0 | 0 | 0 | 0 | 0 | 0 |
| Roma | 2011–12 | 0 | 0 | 0 | 0 | — | | 0 | 0 | — | | 0 | 0 |
| Roma | Total | 0 | 0 | 0 | 0 | — | | 0 | 0 | 0 | 0 | 0 | 0 |
| Lecce (loan) | 2008–09 | 10 | 0 | 0 | 0 | — | | — | | — | | 10 | 0 |
| Leixões (loan) | 2009–10 | 11 | 0 | — | | 1 | 0 | — | | — | | 12 | 0 |
| Livorno (loan) | 2010–11 | 6 | 0 | — | | — | | — | | — | | 6 | 0 |
| Panionios (loan) | 2011–12 | 10 | 1 | — | | — | | — | | — | | 10 | 1 |
| Paços Ferreira | 2012–13 | 14 | 3 | 2 | 0 | 1 | 0 | — | | — | | 17 | 3 |
| Málaga (loan) | 2012–13 | 11 | 1 | 0 | 0 | — | | 4 | 0 | — | | 15 | 1 |
| Málaga | 2013–14 | 36 | 0 | 2 | 1 | — | | — | | — | | 38 | 1 |
| Málaga | 2014–15 | 15 | 1 | 1 | 0 | — | | — | | — | | 16 | 1 |
| Málaga | Total | 51 | 1 | 3 | 1 | — | | — | | — | | 54 | 2 |
| Dynamo Kyiv | 2014–15 | 8 | 1 | 3 | 0 | — | | 6 | 1 | — | | 17 | 2 |
| Dynamo Kyiv | 2015–16 | 22 | 1 | 4 | 1 | — | | 6 | 0 | 1 | 0 | 33 | 2 |
| Dynamo Kyiv | 2016–17 | 19 | 1 | 4 | 0 | — | | 4 | 0 | 1 | 0 | 28 | 1 |
| Dynamo Kyiv | 2017–18 | 0 | 0 | 0 | 0 | — | | 0 | 0 | 1 | 0 | 1 | 0 |
| Dynamo Kyiv | Total | 49 | 3 | 11 | 1 | — | | 16 | 1 | 3 | 0 | 79 | 5 |
| Getafe (loan) | 2017–18 | 34 | 0 | 1 | 0 | — | | — | | — | | 35 | 0 |
| Career total | | 255 | 11 | 24 | 2 | 2 | 0 | 21 | 1 | 3 | 0 | 305 | 14 |

=== International ===
| National team | Year | Apps | Goals |
|---|---|---|---|
| Portugal | 2007 | 1 | 0 |
| Portugal | 2008 | 2 | 0 |
| Portugal | 2013 | 4 | 0 |
| Portugal | 2014 | 1 | 0 |
| Portugal | 2015 | 1 | 0 |
| Portugal | 2016 | 2 | 0 |
| Portugal | 2017 | 2 | 1 |
| Total | | 13 | 1 |

Scores and results list Portugal's goal tally first, score column indicates score after each Antunes goal.

| No. | Date | Venue | Opponent | Score | Result | Competition |
|---|---|---|---|---|---|---|
| 1. | 14 November 2017 | Estádio Dr. Magalhães Pessoa, Leiria, Portugal | United States | 1–1 | 1–1 | Friendly |

== Honours ==
Roma

- Coppa Italia: 2007–08

Dynamo Kyiv

- Ukrainian Premier League: 2014–15, 2015–16
- Ukrainian Cup: 2014–15
- Ukrainian Super Cup: 2016

Sporting CP

- Primeira Liga: 2020–21
- Taça da Liga: 2020–21

Individual

- Liga Portugal 2 Goal of the Month: August 2023
