= Oleksandr Funderat =

Ukrainian footballer and manager

Personal information
- Date of birth: 24 November 1972 (age 53)
- Place of birth: Ukrainian SSR

Team information
- Current team: FC Shakhtar-3 Donetsk

Youth career
- 1983–1989: Zirka Kirovohrad

Senior career*
Years	Team	Apps	(Gls)
1989–1992	Zirka Kirovohrad		

Managerial career
- 2000–2013: Shakhtar-3 Donetsk
- * Club domestic league appearances and goals

Oleksandr Funderat (born 24 November 1972) is a Ukrainian former football player and current manager. After his playing career at FC Zirka in Kirovograd, Ukraine, he went on to become a coaching teacher at the Zirka Youth Sports School. Two years later, in 1994, Funderat became a coaching teacher at the Sports Lyceum in Kirovograd. After a short two year stint, he moved on to become a teacher of Sports and Pedagogy at the Kirovograd State Pedagogical University. In 2000, he became the FC Shakhtar-3 Donetsk coach, a position, that he held until 2013.
