= Kirsha Training Centre =

Training facility of Shakhtar Donetsk

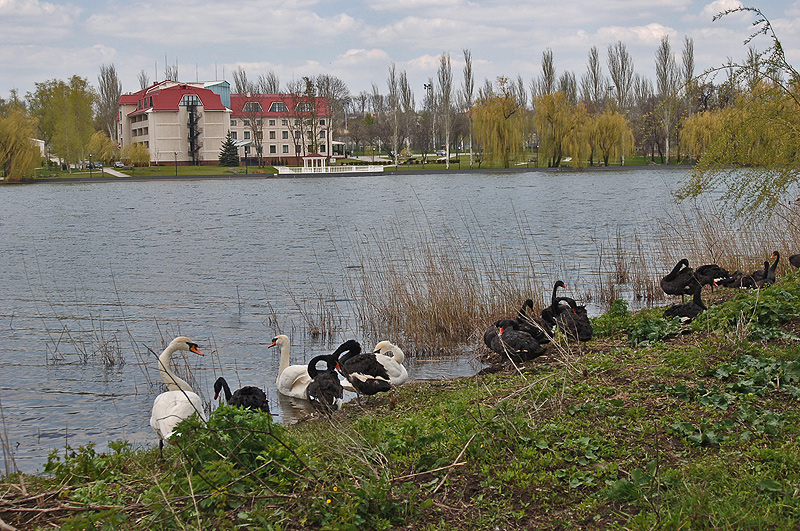
- Interactive map of Kirsha Training Centre
- Location: Donetsk, Ukraine
- Owner: Shakhtar Donetsk
- Type: Sports facility

Construction
- Opened: 1953

Website
- Official website

The Kirsha Training Centre (Ukrainian: Спортивно-тренувальна база «Кірша») is the training facility of the Ukrainian Premier League club Shakhtar Donetsk and its U-19 side, FC Shakhtar-3 Donetsk. Located in Donetsk, Ukraine, the training centre has been open since 1953. Since the centre's opening, upgrades have been made including a rehabilitation centre, gymnasium, canteen, consulting room, medical offices, and many other services.

Due to the Russo-Ukrainian War, the training center was damaged and Shakhtar recreated another training center near Kyiv as Sviatoshyn Training Center.

== Development ==
Previous training facilities for the club had existed on the site since 1953. The new training centre was opened in 1999.

== Facilities ==
The Kirsha Training Centre covers an area of 106.2 acres (0.430 km^{2}). In all, there are nine full-size pitches at the site. Eight are natural grass pitches, and one is made of artificial turf. All of the pitches are illuminated, and three have undersoil heating. The rehabilitation centre consists of medical offices, treatment rooms, a swimming pool, steamroom, gymnasium, IT room, cinema, indoor garden, and a conference hall. Facilities built for FC Shakhtar-3 Donetsk include a canteen, gymnasium, consulting room, dormitories, cinema, IT room, and billiard and table tennis tables.
