= Artem Bessalov =

Ukrainian footballer

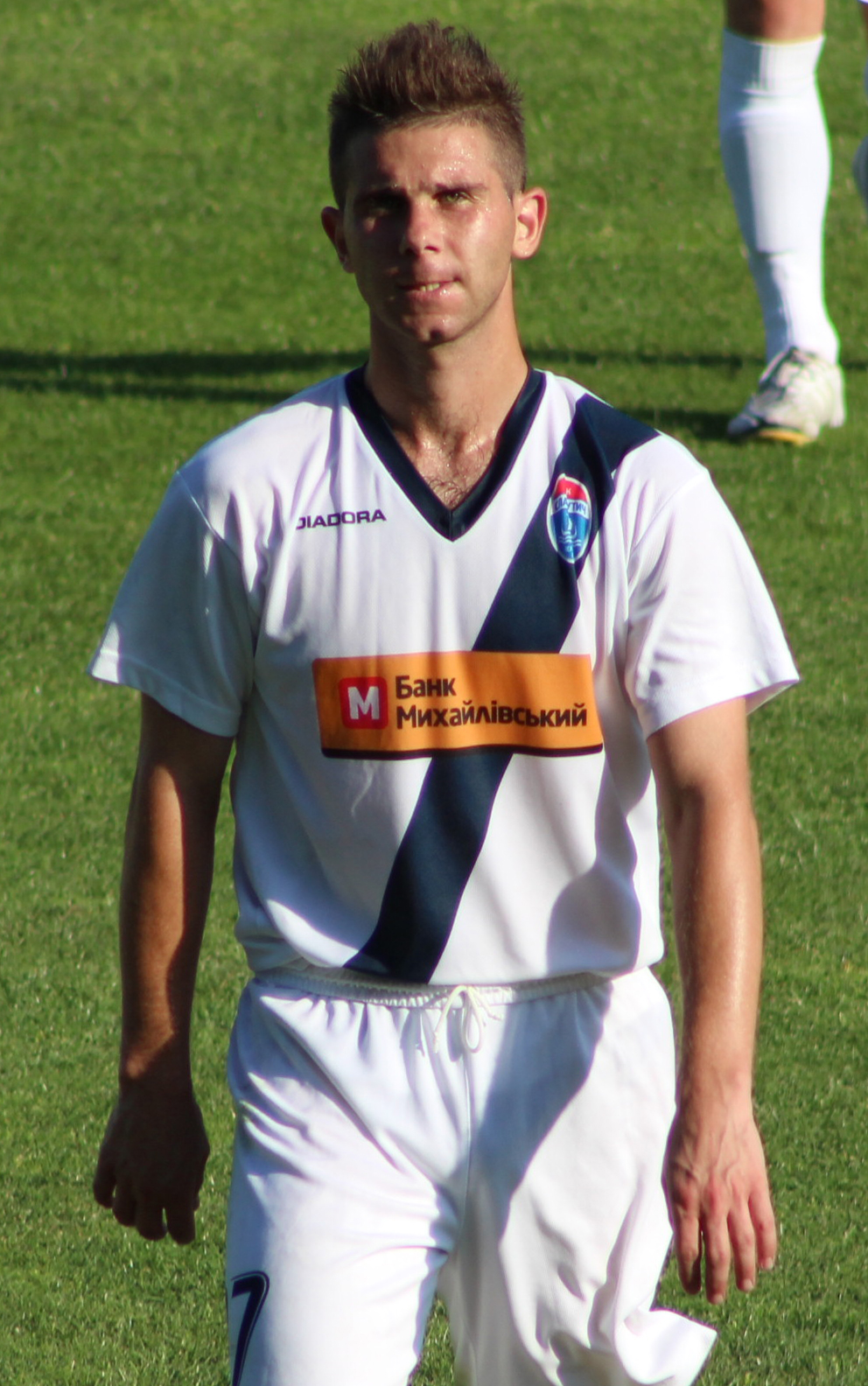

Personal information
- Full name: Artem Leonidovich Bessalov
- Date of birth: 1 April 1983 (age 43)
- Place of birth: Ukraine
- Height: 1.74 m (5 ft 9 in)
- Position: Midfielder

Senior career*
Years	Team	Apps	(Gls)
2001	Mashynobudivnyk	6	(0)
2001-2003	Metalurh-2 (Donetsk)	54	(3)
2003-2005	Stal (Kamianske)	68	(4)
2006–2008	Helios	71	(6)
2008–2009	Dnipro (Cherkasy)	19	(2)
2009–2010	Mykolaiv	20	(3)
2010–2012	Poltava	68	(4)
2013	Mykolaiv	11	(0)
2014	Krystal (Kherson)	8	(0)
2014–2015	Cherkashchyna	22	(1)
2015–2017	Mykolaiv	45	(2)
2017	→ Mykolaiv-2 (loan)	16	(1)
2018	Enakievo	9	(2)
2019–2020	Pobeda (Donetsk)		

International career
2015–2020	Donetsk People's Republic		
- * Club domestic league appearances and goals

Artem Leonidovich Bessalov (Russian: Артем Бессалов; born 1 April 1983) is a Ukrainian footballer who last played as a midfielder for Pobeda (Donetsk).

== Early life ==
As a youth player, Bessalov graduated the youth academy of Ukrainian side Mariupol.

== Club career ==
Bessalov has been regarded as one of the most prominent players in the Ukrainian First League in his time. In 2013, he signed for Ukrainian side Mykolaiv, where he was regarded to have been unable to establish himself as an important played for the club after the arrival of manager Oleh Fedorchuk. In 2014, he signed for Ukrainian side Cherkashchyna, where he was regarded as one of the club's most important players. In 2015, he returned to Ukrainian side Mykolaiv, where he was regarded as one of the club's most important players.

== International career ==
Bessalov played for the Donetsk People's Republic national football team, where he was regarded to have been one of the most prominent players on the team.

== Style of play ==
Bessalov mainly operates as a central midfielder and is known for his ability to support the attack.

== Personal life ==
Bessalov is the older brother of Ukrainian footballer Maxim Bessalov.
