= Yehor Ivanov =

Ukrainian footballer

Personal information
- Full name: Yehor Serhiyovych Ivanov
- Date of birth: 30 August 1991 (age 35)
- Place of birth: Dnipropetrovsk, Ukraine
- Height: 1.84 m (6 ft 1/2 in)
- Position: Forward

Team information
- Current team: FC Poltava
- Number: 17

Youth career
- 2004–2008: UFK Dnipropetrovak

Senior career*
Years	Team	Apps	(Gls)
2008–2009	FC Vorskla Poltava	0	(0)
2009–2013	FC Illichivets Mariupol	9	(0)
2009	→ FC Illichivets-2 Mariupol	5	(2)
2012–2013	→ FC Zirka Kirovohrad (loan)	22	(3)
2013–2015	FC Kremin Kremenchuk	50	(20)
2015–	FC Poltava	35	(3)

International career^{‡}
2012	Ukraine-20	1	(0)
- * Club domestic league appearances and goals as of 20 January 2017 ‡ National team caps and goals as of 20 January 2017

Yehor Ivanov (Ukrainian: Єгор Сергійович Іванов; born 30 August 1991) is a Ukrainian football striker who plays for FC Poltava in the Ukrainian First League.

He made his debut for main Illichivets team as substitution in second half in a match against Tavriya Simferopol in Ukrainian Premier League on 26 September 2011.
