= Stanislav Kulish =

Ukrainian footballer

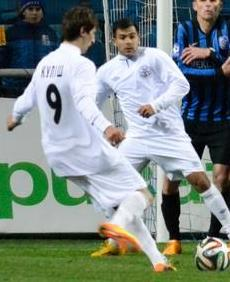
- Stanislav Kulish (2014)

Personal information
- Full name: Stanislav Konstiantynovych Kulish
- Date of birth: 8 February 1989 (age 37)
- Place of birth: Dnipropetrovsk, Ukrainian SSR
- Height: 1.82 m (5 ft 11 1/2 in)
- Position: Forward

Team information
- Current team: Skoruk Tomakivka
- Number: 10

Youth career
- 2003–2007: Dnipro Dnipropetrovsk

Senior career*
Years	Team	Apps	(Gls)
2007–2009	Dnipro-75 Dnipropetrovsk	43	(14)
2010	Elektrometalurh-NZF Nikopol	7	(3)
2011–2012	Dnipro Dnipropetrovsk	0	(0)
2011–2012	→ Dnipro-2 Dnipropetrovsk	23	(6)
2012–2015	Stal Dniprodzerzhynsk	93	(81)
2015	Metalist Kharkiv	9	(0)
2016–2017	Oleksandriya	38	(7)
2018	Veres Rivne	11	(2)
2018–2019	Dnipro-1	35	(19)
2020	Volyn Lutsk	8	(1)
2020	Kremin Kremenchuk	12	(1)
2020–2021	VPK-Ahro Shevchenkivka	19	(9)
2023	Skoruk Tomakivka	3	(0)
- * Club domestic league appearances and goals

Stanislav Kulish (Ukrainian: Станіслав Костянтинович Куліш; born 8 February 1989) is a Ukrainian professional footballer who plays as a midfielder for Skoruk Tomakivka.

== Career ==
Kulish is product of youth team system of FC Dnipro Dnipropetrovsk.

Kulish became the second highest scorer in one season when he scored 29 goals for Stal Dniprodzerzhynsk during the 2012–13 Ukrainian Second League season.

In March 2023 he signed for Skoruk Tomakivka.

== Honours ==
SC Dnipro-1

- Ukrainian First League: 2018–19

Stal Kamianske

- Ukrainian First League: 2014–15
- Ukrainian Second League: 2013–14

Individual

- Top Scorer of Ukrainian First League: 2018–19 (17 goals)
- Top Scorer of Ukrainian First League: 2014–15 (21 goals)
