= Bannikov Stadium =

Football stadium in Ukraine

NTK imeni Viktora Bannikova
- Stadion Bannikova
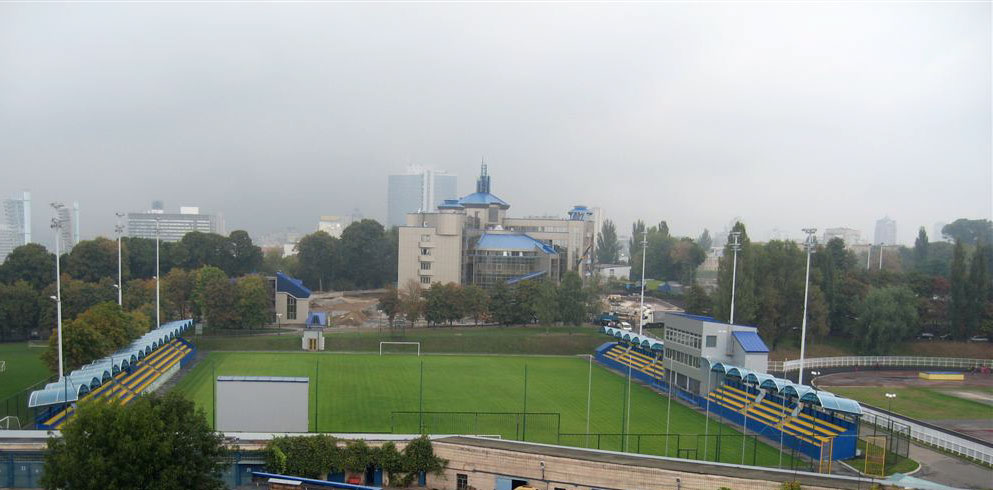
- Interactive map of NTK imeni Viktora Bannikova
- Former names: verkhnie pole Respublikanskoho stadiona (upper field of Republican Stadium)
- Location: provulok Laboratorny, 7b Kyiv, Ukraine
- Coordinates: 50°25′44.50″N 30°31′31.00″E
- Owner: Ukrainian Association of Football (formerly Football Federation of Ukraine)
- Capacity: 1,678
- Surface: Grass
- Field size: 105 m × 68 m (344 ft × 223 ft)

Construction
- Groundbreaking: unknown
- Renovated: 2004–2005

Tenants
- Ukrainian youth national teams (2005–present); Obolon Kyiv (2005); Arsenal Kyiv (2008–2010); Olimpik Donetsk (2014–2021)

Navchanlno-trenuvalnyi kompleks imeni Viktora Bannikova (Viktor Bannikov training complex) is a small football stadium located close to the House of Football and the Olympic Stadium in Kyiv, Ukraine. The stadium is named after a goalkeeper of FC Dynamo Kyiv and the first president of Ukrainian Association of Football (formerly Football Federation of Ukraine).

The stadium is intended for junior squads of the Ukraine national football team, but is also used as a temporary stadium for professional clubs.

== History ==
The ground was regarded as a training ground for the Republican Stadium (Respublikansky Stadion) and until 2004 was referred to simply as a verkhnie pole Respublikanskoho stadiona (upper field of the Republican Stadium).

In 2004, the Ukrainian Football Federation invested in rebuilding the ground as a training complex with facilities and couple of small grandstands to accommodate those who would watch games there.

The first matches were played in 2005. The stadium holds seating for 1,678. However, the record attendance was 2,000 for a Ukraine under-21 international game against Turkey on 5 September 2005.

The ground has been used in Ukraine Premier League matches for the first time by Obolon (2005), later utilized by FC Lviv (2009), and then was leased to Arsenal Kyiv for the 2008-09 season. In 2009, the field was a lifeline for Arsenal which due to the renovation of the Olimpisky NSC (Respublikansky Stadium) was under threat of being suspended by the League. Arsenal returned once again to Bannikov in 2010.

The stadium was once again renewed as a Premier League venue for the 2014–15 season by Olimpik Donetsk due to the war in Donbas.

Bannikov is a regular home field of the Ukraine U-21, U-19, and U-17 teams. The stadium is named after the goalkeeper of Dynamo and Soviet national team and later the first president of Football Federation of Ukraine Viktor Bannikov.

=== Emergency incidents ===
On 9 August 2014, a former FC Dynamo Kyiv and USSR national football team player Andriy Bal died at the Bannikov Stadium, when he collapsed because of a blood clot during a veterans match.
