= Samir Hasanov =

Ukrainian footballer (born 1967)

Personal information
- Full name: Samir Nazimovych Hasanov
- Date of birth: 9 September 1967 (age 59)
- Place of birth: Kirovohrad, Ukrainian SSR
- Height: 1.71 m (5 ft 7 in)
- Position: Midfielder

Youth career
- Kirovohrad

Senior career*
Years	Team	Apps	(Gls)
1989–1994	FC Zirka Kirovohrad	148	(16)
1991	→ FC Polihraftekhnika Oleksandriya	5	
1994	FC Sirius Zhovti Vody	30	(2)
1995	FC Vodnyk Kherson	18	(2)
1996	FC Khimik Severodonetsk	19	(10)
1996	FC Zorya Luhansk	22	(4)
1997	FC Polihraftekhnika Oleksandriya	17	(1)
1997	FC Verkhovyna Uzhhorod	21	(6)
1998–1999	FC Polihraftekhnika Oleksandriya	45	(2)
1999–2000	FC Elektrometalurh Nikopol	26	(11)
2000–2003	FC Zirka Kirovohrad	71	(9)
2003	Olimpiya FC AES Yuzhnoukrainsk	1	(0)

Managerial career
- 2003–2004: FC Zirka Kirovohrad (assistant)
- 2004–2006: FC Zorya Luhansk (assistant)
- 2007: FC Nyva Ternopil
- 2007–2008: FC Nyva Ternopil (assistant)
- 2008–2009: PFC Oleksandria (assistant)
- 2009–2010: FC Stal Dniprodzerzhynsk (assistant)
- 2011: FK Mash'al Mubarek (academy)
- 2012: FC Nasaf (assistant)
- 2013–2014: FC Zirka Kirovohrad (assistant)
- 2013: FC Zirka Kirovohrad
- 2014: FC Zirka Kirovohrad
- 2014–2016: FC Zirka Kirovohrad (sports director)
- 2016–: FC Nyva Ternopil (sports director)
- 2017: FC Nyva Ternopil
- * Club domestic league appearances and goals

Samir Hasanov (Ukrainian: Самір Назімович Гасанов; born 9 September 1967 in Kirovohrad) is a former Soviet and Ukrainian footballer and Ukrainian football manager.
