= House of Football =

- Будинок футболу
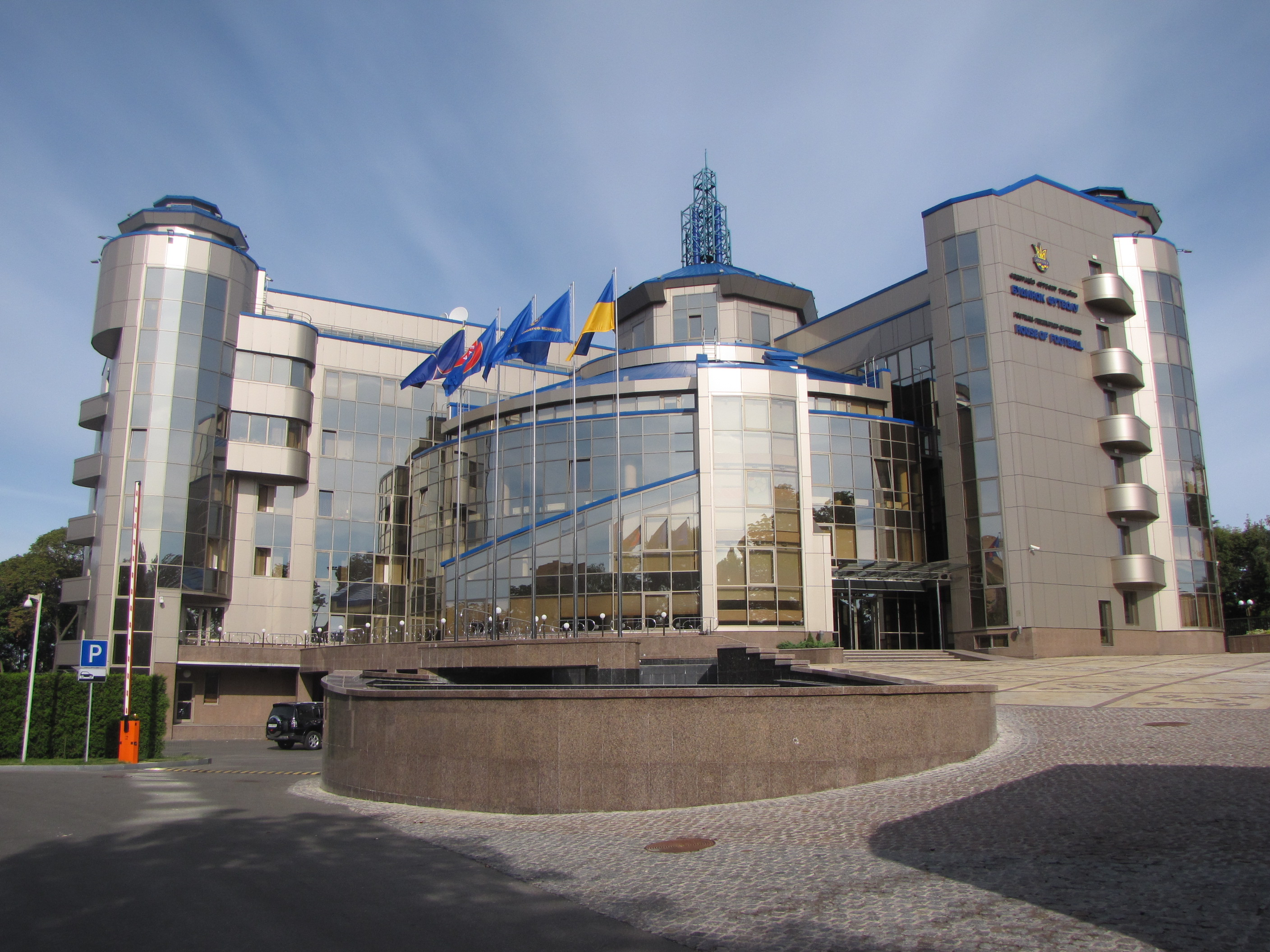
- Interactive map of the House of Football area

General information
- Location: Laboratornyi provulok, 7a, Kyiv, Ukraine
- Coordinates: 50°25′48″N 30°31′30″E
- Groundbreaking: 15 April 2004
- Inaugurated: 30 November 2006
- Owner: Football Federation of Ukraine

Technical details
- Floor count: 5

House of Football (Ukrainian: Будинок футболу, romanized: Budynok futbolu, IPA: [bʊˈdɪnok fʊdˈbɔlʊ]) is the headquarters of the Ukrainian Association of Football located in Kyiv, Ukraine, near the Olympiyskiy National Sports Complex.

Construction of the building started on 15 April 2004. The construction was sponsored by the UEFA program "HatTrick". The opening ceremony of the House of Football on 30 November 2006 was attended by the former UEFA President Lennart Johansson, President of the Ukrainian Association of Football, Hryhoriy Surkis as well as other important officials among whom were Leonid Kuchma, Valeriy Pustovoitenko, Leonid Kravchuk and Michel Platini. The building has five floors, four conference halls, a restaurant, its own television studio and publishing house, as well as a museum dedicated to the history of football in Ukraine.

Across the street is the Bannikov Stadium, and nearby are the Light-Athletics Training Complex "Atlet", the Central Military Clinical Hospital of Ministry of Defense, Kyiv Fortress, the factory "RADAR", the Kyiv city clinic hospital #17 and the National University of Physical Education and Sports.

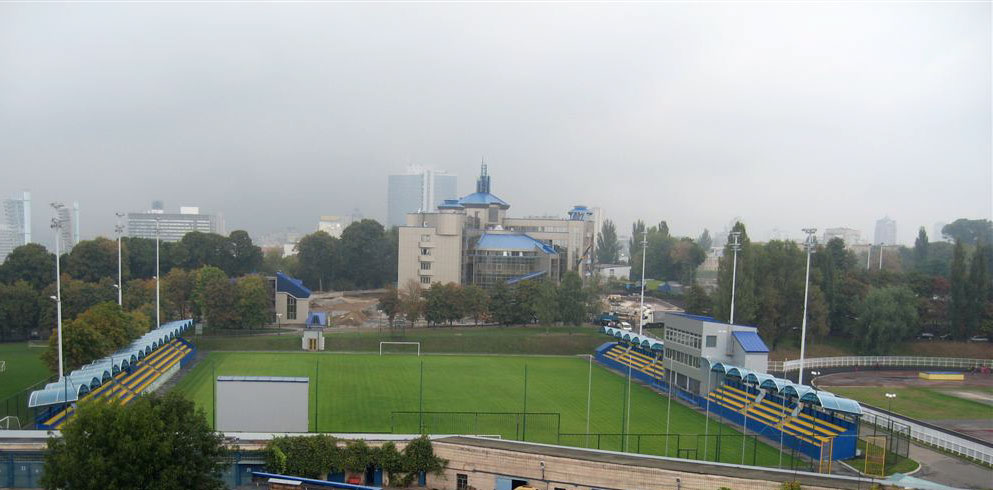
House of Football behind the Bannikov Stadium
