= Anton Kotlyar =

Ukrainian footballer

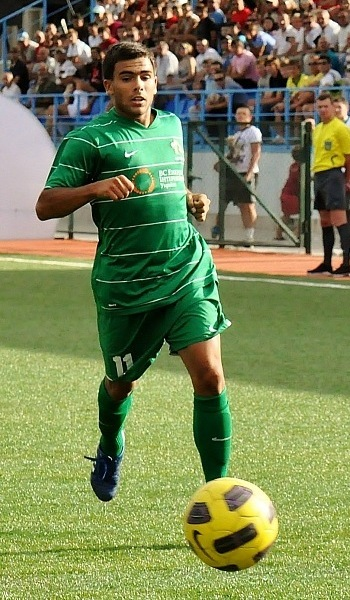

Personal information
- Full name: Anton Stanislavovych Kotlyar
- Date of birth: 7 March 1993 (age 33)
- Place of birth: Kirovohrad, Ukraine
- Height: 1.67 m (5 ft 6 in)
- Position: Midfielder

Youth career
- 2004–2005: Sports school 2 Kirovohrad
- 2006–2008: Dynamo Kyiv
- 2008–2009: Monolit Illichivsk
- 2009–2010: Dynamo Kyiv

Senior career*
Years	Team	Apps	(Gls)
2010–2011	Dynamo Kyiv	0	(0)
2011–2012	Oleksandriya	0	(0)
2012–2016	Stal Dniprodzerzhynsk	110	(20)
2016	Naftan Novopolotsk	12	(0)
2016–2017	Veres Rivne	41	(2)
2018	Helios Kharkiv	10	(0)
2018	Veres Rivne	9	(1)
2019	Hirnyk-Sport Horishni Plavni	20	(3)
2020–2021	LNZ Cherkasy (amateurs)	16	(9)
2021	Druzhba Myrivka (amateurs)	0	(0)

International career
2017	Ukraine (students)		
- * Club domestic league appearances and goals as of 23:58, 2 July 2021 (UTC)

Anton Stanislavovych Kotlyar (Ukrainian: Антон Станіславович Котляр; born 7 March 1993) is a Ukrainian former footballer who played as a midfielder.
