= 2014–15 Ukrainian Premier League =

24th season of top-tier football league in Vyshcha Liha

Ukrainian Premier League
- Season: 2014–15
- Champions: Dynamo Kyiv; 14th title
- Champions League: Dynamo Kyiv; Shakhtar Donetsk
- Europa League: Dnipro Dnipropetrovsk; Zorya Luhansk; Vorskla Poltava
- Matches: 181
- Goals: 481 (2.66 per match)
- Top goalscorer: 17 – Eric Bicfalvi (Volyn); Alex Teixeira (Shakhtar)
- Biggest home win: 6 – Shakhtar 6–0 Olimpik (Round 17); Dynamo 6–0 Hoverla (Round 22)
- Biggest away win: 6 – Metalurh Donetsk 0–6 Dynamo (Round 23)
- Highest scoring: 10 – Hoverla 3–7 Shakhtar (Round 23)
- Longest winning run: 7 – Dynamo (Round 13–14,10,15–18)
- Longest unbeaten run: 26 – Dynamo (Round 1–26)
- Longest winless run: 15 – Illichivets (Round 1–15)
- Longest losing run: 4 – Illichivets (Round 11–14)
- Highest attendance: 57,502 – Dynamo–Shakhtar (Round 8)
- Lowest attendance: 0 – Volyn–Chornomorets (Round 16)
- All statistics correct as of 24 May 2015.

The 2014–15 Ukrainian Premier League season was the 24th since its establishment. The competition commenced on 25 July when Metalurh Donetsk hosted Dnipro Dnipropetrovsk in Lviv. Due to the war in Donbas, the league reduced the number of teams and eventually was one game short of completion due to heightened terrorist level.

== Format ==
Initially, a new format was proposed to be introduced for this season by FC Shakhtar Donetsk. The first stage was to be a regular round robin of home/away format. In the second stage, the championship was to have an additional play-off format in which participants, upon completion of the regular round-robin, were to be split into three groups of 4 (1–4 places), 4 (5–8 places), and 6 (9–14 places) teams. The points earned in the first stage were to be preserved. The first two groups of four teams would each have a regular round robin home/away format, while the third group of six was to play each other only once.

However, on 22 July 2014, it was confirmed that the championship would be played using a standard double round-robin tournament system. The last team would be relegated and would be replaced by the champion of the 2014–15 Ukrainian First League.

== Teams ==
Initially, a total of 16 teams were expected to participate in the league: the best 14 sides of the 2013–14 season and two promoted clubs from the 2013–14 Ukrainian First League. The fifteenth-placed team of the 2013–14 Ukrainian Premier League, Tavriya Simferopol was relegated to the 2014–15 Ukrainian First League at the end of the season. A second team was to be relegated, but with the withdrawal of Arsenal Kyiv during the 2013–14 Ukrainian Premier League season, only one team was relegated.

Teams from Crimea, namely Sevastopol and Tavriya Simferopol, will not participate in the Ukrainian competition since they ceased their existence and applied (under new names) for a Russian license after the annexation of Crimea by Russia in March 2014.

The relegated team and the vacant position were to be replaced by the champions of the 2013–14 Ukrainian First League, FC Olimpik Donetsk, and the runners-up, PFC Oleksandriya. But PFC Oleksandriya refused the promotion to the Premier League and merged with FC UkrAhroKom Holovkivka.

On 2 June 2014, the Premier League published two preliminary projects of possible season schedule with 16 and 12 teams respectively. On 27 June 2014, it was confirmed that 14 teams will play in the 2014–15 season.

=== Location map ===
Home venues of teams in the 2014–15 Ukrainian Premier League.
Teams in italics are from cities in the conflict zone of the War in Donbas and are playing their home games in different cities.
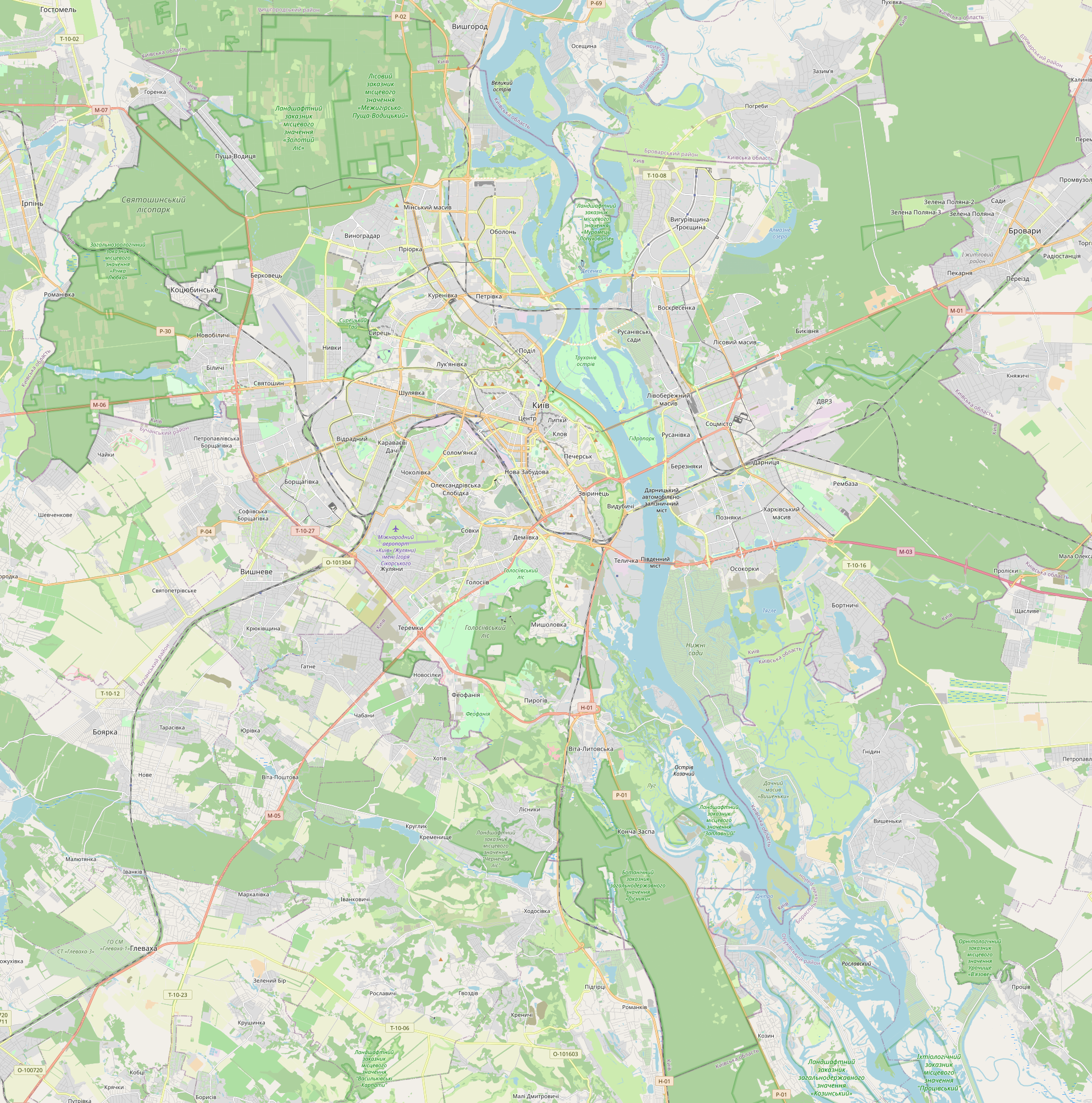
Kyiv city home venues of teams in the League
Lviv city home venues of teams in the League

=== Stadiums ===
The following stadiums are regarded as home grounds:

| Rank | Stadium | Club | Capacity | Highest Attendance | | Notes |
|---|---|---|---|---|---|---|
| 1 | NSC Olimpiyskiy | Dynamo Kyiv | 70,050 | 57,502 | Round 8 (Shakhtar) | |
| 1 | NSC Olimpiyskiy | Metalurh Donetsk | 70,050 | 12,869 | Round 23 (Dynamo) | Used as home ground in Round 23. |
| 2 | OSC Metalist | Metalist Kharkiv | 40,003 | 21,546 | Round 6 (Dnipro) | |
| 3 | Arena Lviv | Shakhtar Donetsk | 34,915 | 32,509 | Round 21 (Dynamo) | Used as home ground. |
| 3 | Arena Lviv | Metalurh Donetsk | 34,915 | 7,527 | Round 1 (Dnipro) | Used as home ground in Round 1. |
| 4 | Chornomorets Stadium | Chornomorets Odesa | 34,164 | 25,182 | Round 6 (Shakhtar) | |
| 5 | Dnipro-Arena | Dnipro Dnipropetrovsk | 31,003 | 17,444 | Round 25 (Shakhtar) | |
| 6 | Ukraina Stadium | Karpaty Lviv | 28,051 | 7,800 | Round 2 (Metalurh D.) | |
| 7 | Vorskla Stadium | Vorskla Poltava | 24,795 | 10,600 | Round 9 (Metalist) | |
| 8 | Meteor Stadium | Illichivets Mariupol | 24,381 | 8,000 | Round 8(Dnipro) | Used as temporary home ground |
| 9 | Dynamo Stadium | Dynamo Kyiv | 16,873 | 10,000 | Round 17 (Metalurh Z.) | Used as home ground in return match |
| 9 | Dynamo Stadium | Chornomorets Odesa | 16,873 | 5,314 | Round 18 (Dynamo) | Used as home ground in Round 18. |
| 10 | Avanhard Stadium | Volyn Lutsk | 12,080 | 8,700 | Round 20 (Dynamo) | |
| 11 | Slavutych-Arena | Metalurh Zaporizhzhia | 12,000 | 10,000 | Round 4 (Dnipro) | |
| 11 | Slavutych-Arena | Zorya Luhansk | 12,000 | 4,100 | Round 6 (Dynamo) | Used as home ground during season. |
| 12 | Avanhard Stadium | Hoverla Uzhhorod | 12,000 | 8,800 | Round 9 (Dynamo) | |
| 13 | Obolon Arena | Metalurh Donetsk | 5,100 | 2,500 | Round 3 (Metalurh Z.) | Used as temporary home ground |
| 13 | Obolon Arena | Illichivets Mariupol | 5,100 | 2,700 | Round 18 (Shakhtar) | Used as home ground in Round 18. |
| 13 | Obolon Arena | Shakhtar Donetsk | 5,100 | 3,200 | Round 26 (Karpaty) | Used as home ground in Round 26. |
| 14 | Bannikov Stadium | Olimpik Donetsk | 1,678 | 1,200 | Round 4 (Shakhtar) | Used as temporary home ground |
| 14 | Bannikov Stadium | Shakhtar Donetsk | 1,678 | 1,100 | Round 7 (Zorya) | Used as home ground in Round 5. |

Note:

Round when attendance is noted as highest is the chronological number of the round, not the published round by the Ukrainian Premier League since some rounds were rescheduled for a later date.

=== Personnel and sponsorship ===
| Team | Home city | Head coach | Captain | Kit manufacturer | Shirt sponsor |
|---|---|---|---|---|---|
| Chornomorets Odesa | Odesa | (Ukraine) Oleksandr Babych (interim) | (Ukraine) Anatoliy Didenko | Nike | Imexbank |
| Dnipro Dnipropetrovsk | Dnipropetrovsk | (Ukraine) Myron Markevych | (Ukraine) Ruslan Rotan | Nike | Biola |
| Dynamo Kyiv | Kyiv | (Ukraine) Serhii Rebrov | (Ukraine) Oleksandr Shovkovskyi | adidas | Ostchem |
| Hoverla Uzhhorod | Uzhhorod | (Ukraine) Vyacheslav Hrozny | (Uzbekistan) Maksim Shatskikh | adidas | — |
| Illichivets Mariupol | Mariupol | (Ukraine) Mykola Pavlov | (Ukraine) Serhiy Yavorskyi | Nike | AIG |
| Karpaty Lviv | Lviv | (Croatia) Igor Jovićević (interim) | (Ukraine) Oleh Holodyuk | Joma | Favbet / Limo |
| Metalist Kharkiv | Kharkiv | (Ukraine) Ihor Rakhayev | (Ukraine) Serhiy Pohorilyi | adidas | VETEK |
| Metalurh Donetsk | Donetsk | (Ukraine) Volodymyr Pyatenko | (Ukraine) Vyacheslav Checher | Umbro | ISD |
| Metalurh Zaporizhzhia | Zaporizhzhia | (Ukraine) Anatoliy Chantsev | (Ukraine) Vitaliy Lysytskyi | Nike | Zaporizhstal |
| Olimpik Donetsk | Donetsk | (Ukraine) Roman Sanzhar | (Ukraine) Dmytro Hryshko | Puma | Altkom |
| Shakhtar Donetsk | Donetsk | (Romania) Mircea Lucescu | (Croatia) Darijo Srna | Nike | SCM |
| Volyn Lutsk | Lutsk | (Ukraine) Vitaliy Kvartsyanyi | (Romania) Eric Bicfalvi | adidas | Vodafone |
| Vorskla Poltava | Poltava | (Ukraine) Vasyl Sachko | (Albania) Armend Dallku | adidas | Ferrexpo |
| Zorya Luhansk | Luhansk | (Ukraine) Yuriy Vernydub | (Ukraine) Mykyta Kamenyuka | Nike | Holsten |

=== Managerial changes ===
| Team | Outgoing head coach | Manner of departure | Date of vacancy | Table | Incoming head coach | Date of appointment |
|---|---|---|---|---|---|---|
| Dynamo Kyiv | (Ukraine) Serhii Rebrov (interim) | Change of contract | May 18 | Pre-season | (Ukraine) Serhii Rebrov | May 18 |
| Metalist Kharkiv | (Ukraine) Ihor Rakhayev (interim) | Change of contract | May 19 | Pre-season | (Ukraine) Ihor Rakhayev | May 19 |
| Dnipro Dnipropetrovsk | (Spain) Juande Ramos | End of contract | May 22 | Pre-season | (Ukraine) Myron Markevych | May 26 |
| Metalurh Donetsk | (Russia) Sergei Tashuyev | Signed by Anzhi Makhachkala | May 22 | Pre-season | (Ukraine) Volodymyr Pyatenko | June 16 |
| Vorskla Poltava | (Ukraine) Anatoliy Momot | Interim coach | June 10 | Pre-season | (Ukraine) Vasyl Sachko | June 10 |
| Karpaty Lviv | (Ukraine) Oleksandr Sevidov | Mutual agreement | June 17 | Pre-season | (Croatia) Igor Jovićević (interim) | June 18 |
| Metalurh Zaporizhzhia | (Ukraine) Oleh Taran | Sacked | November 7 | 11th | (Ukraine) Oleksandr Tomakh (interim) | November 7 |
| Chornomorets Odesa | (Ukraine) Roman Hryhorchuk | Mutual consent | December 16 | 9th | (Ukraine) Oleksandr Babych (interim) | December 16 |
| Metalurh Zaporizhzhia | (Ukraine) Oleksandr Tomakh (interim) | End as interim | February 24 | 11th | (Ukraine) Anatoliy Chantsev | February 24 |

== Qualification to European competitions for 2015–16 ==
- Since Ukraine finished in ninth place of the UEFA country ranking after the 2013–14 season, the league should have received the same number of qualifiers for 2015–16 UEFA Europa League. However, due to the recent format change, Ukraine will have only three teams entering the UEFA Europa League. The Ukrainian Cup winner qualifies for the Group stage.

=== Qualified teams ===
- After the 20th Round, Dynamo Kyiv qualified for European football for the 2015–16 season.
- After the 21st Round, both Dnipro Dnipropetrovsk and Shakhtar Donetsk qualified for European football for the 2015–16 season.
- After the 24th Round, Dynamo Kyiv qualified for the 2015–16 UEFA Champions League Group Stage after they defeated Dnipro Dnipropetrovsk.
- After the Ukrainian Cup Semi-finals, with both finalists having qualified for European football the fifth placed team will be able to qualified for 2015–16 UEFA Europa League. Zorya Luhansk can finish no worse than fifth and therefore qualify for Europa League third qualifying round.
- After the 25th Round, Vorskla Poltava qualified for the 2015–16 UEFA Europa League, entering in the third qualifying round.

== League table ==
| Pos | Team | Pld | W | D | L | GF | GA | GD | Pts | Qualification or relegation |
|---|---|---|---|---|---|---|---|---|---|---|
| 1 | Dynamo Kyiv (C) | 26 | 20 | 6 | 0 | 65 | 12 | +53 | 66 | Qualification for the Champions League group stage |
| 2 | Shakhtar Donetsk | 26 | 17 | 5 | 4 | 71 | 21 | +50 | 56 | Qualification for the Champions League third qualifying round |
| 3 | Dnipro Dnipropetrovsk | 26 | 16 | 6 | 4 | 47 | 17 | +30 | 54 | Qualification for the Europa League group stage (Note: Since winners of 2014–15 Ukrainian Cup, Dynamo Kyiv, qualified for the 2015–16 UEFA Champions League, the place in the Europa League group stage for the cup winner will be given to the third-placed team and the spots to Europa League third qualifying round will be given to the fourth-placed and fifth-placed teams.) |
| 4 | Zorya Luhansk (Note: Zorya Luhansk were initially deducted a total of 3 points on decision of the FFU Control Disciplinary Committee on 18 February 2015, but the decision was reversed and the FFU reinstated the three points to Zorya Luhansk. (17 June 2015)) | 26 | 13 | 6 | 7 | 40 | 31 | +9 | 45 | Qualification for the Europa League third qualifying round |
| 5 | Vorskla Poltava | 26 | 11 | 9 | 6 | 35 | 22 | +13 | 42 | Qualification for the Europa League third qualifying round |
| 6 | Metalist Kharkiv | 25 | 8 | 11 | 6 | 34 | 32 | +2 | 35 | |
| 7 | Metalurh Zaporizhya | 26 | 6 | 8 | 12 | 20 | 40 | −20 | 26 | |
| 8 | Olimpik Donetsk | 26 | 7 | 5 | 14 | 24 | 64 | −40 | 26 | |
| 9 | Volyn Lutsk (Note: Volyn Lutsk were deducted a total of 9 points on decision of the FFU Control and Disciplinary Committee (24 February 2015)) | 26 | 9 | 7 | 10 | 38 | 44 | −6 | 25 | |
| 10 | Metalurh Donetsk (Note: Metalurh Donetsk were deducted a total of 6 points on decision of the FIFA Disciplinary Committee (9 September 2014). After the season completed the president of FC Stal Dniprodzerzhynsk announced that the club will be merged with FC Metalurh Donetsk and replace them in the Premier League for the 2015–16 season. (14 June 2015)) | 26 | 6 | 10 | 10 | 27 | 38 | −11 | 22 | Club folded after the season |
| 11 | Chornomorets Odesa | 25 | 3 | 11 | 11 | 15 | 31 | −16 | 20 | |
| 12 | Hoverla Uzhhorod | 26 | 3 | 10 | 13 | 22 | 47 | −25 | 19 | |
| 13 | Karpaty Lviv (Note: Karpaty Lviv were deducted a total of 9 points. Initially three points were deducted and then additional 6 points for non compliance with contractual agreements with player agents (regarding Martin Bogatinov).) | 26 | 5 | 9 | 12 | 22 | 31 | −9 | 15 | |
| 14 | Illichivets Mariupol (R) | 26 | 3 | 5 | 18 | 25 | 55 | −30 | 14 | Relegation to Ukrainian First League |

Source: uafootball.net.ua
Rules for classification: 1) points; 2) goal difference; 3) goals scored; 4) head-to-head points; 5) head-to-head goal difference; 6) head-to-head goals scored; 7) fair play rating
(C) Champions; (R) Relegated

=== Results ===
| Home \ Away | CHO | DNI | DYK | HOV | ILL | KAR | MET | MDO | MZA | OLD | SHA | VOL | VOR | ZOR |
|---|---|---|---|---|---|---|---|---|---|---|---|---|---|---|
| Chornomorets Odesa | — | 0–3 | 0–2 (Note: The game was played at the Valeriy Lobanovskyi Dynamo Stadium in Kyiv where Chornomorets Odesa officially relocated due to security concerns over terrorist attacks.) | 1–1 | 0–0 | 0–0 | dnp (Note: The Round 26 match between Chornomorets Odesa and Metalist Kharkiv was not played as per recommendation of Ministry of Internal Affairs of Ukraine.) | 2–2 | 0–0 | 4–0 | 0–2 | 1–0 | 1–0 | 0–0 |
| Dnipro | 2–1 | — | 0–3 | 1–1 | 1–0 | 4–0 | 0–0 | 1–1 | 1–0 | 5–0 | 3–2 | 5–0 | 1–1 | 0–2 |
| Dynamo Kyiv | 2–0 | 1–0 | — | 6–0 | 5–0 | 0–0 | 3–0 | 3–0 | 2–2 | 0–0 | 1–0 | 4–1 | 1–0 | 2–2 |
| Hoverla Uzhhorod | 0–0 | 0–0 | 0–4 | — | 2–1 | 2–2 | 2–2 | 1–0 | 0–1 | 0–1 | 3–7 | 0–0 | 0–0 | 1–2 |
| Illichivets Mariupol (Note: Mariupol's first three scheduled home games, in rounds 1, 2 and 4 against Volyn Lutsk, Chornomorets and Dynamo were instead played away, with Mariupol hosting the fixture later in the season.) | 3–3 | 0–1 | 1–4 | 2–2 | — | 1–0 | 1–3 | 1–1 | 1–2 | 4–1 | 2–6 | 1–2 | 1–2 | 2–1 |
| Karpaty Lviv | 2–0 | 0–1 | 0–1 | 1–0 | 1–0 | — | 3–3 | 0–1 | 1–2 | 4–1 | 0–2 | 0–2 | 0–0 | 1–2 |
| Metalist Kharkiv | 0–0 | 2–5 | 1–2 | 1–0 | 3–1 | 0–0 | — | 1–0 | 2–1 | 0–0 | 2–2 | 3–3 | 0–2 | 4–2 |
| Metalurh Donetsk | 1–0 | 0–2 | 0–6 | 0–0 | 3–0 | 1–1 | 1–1 | — | 1–1 | 4–2 | 2–1 | 1–2 | 1–1 | 0–0 |
| Metalurh Zaporizhzhia | 0–0 | 0–1 | 2–4 | 2–1 | 2–0 | 2–1 | 0–0 | 0–1 | — | 2–2 | 0–4 | 1–1 | 0–3 | 0–1 |
| Olimpik Donetsk | 2–1 | 0–5 | 0–1 | 1–2 | 3–2 | 1–0 | 2–1 | 3–2 | 0–0 | — | 0–5 | 1–3 | 1–1 | 1–0 |
| Shakhtar Donetsk | 5–0 | 0–0 | 0–0 | 4–1 | 3–0 | 2–2 | 1–0 | 2–0 | 2–0 | 6–0 | — | 6–2 | 3–0 | 0–1 |
| Volyn Lutsk | 1–1 (Note: Round 16 match between Volyn Lutsk and Chornomorets Odesa played in an empty stadium as ruled by the Ukrainian Football Federation Disciplinary Committee as punishment for invasion of the pitch in the Round 14 home match against Metalist Kharkiv.) | 0–1 | 1–3 | 4–2 | 3–1 | 0–2 | 0–3 (Note: Round 14 match between Volyn Lutsk and Metalist Kharkiv was abandoned in the 88th minute after fans invaded the pitch with the score 1–2. The FFU Control-Disciplinary Committee annuls the score of the game and awards Metalist a 3–0 technical win. (23 January 2015)) | 1–1 | 3–0 | 4–0 | 0–0 | — | 2–2 | 1–2 |
| Vorskla Poltava | 2–0 | 1–3 | 0–3 | 2–0 | 0–0 | 2–0 | 0–0 | 2–1 | 5–0 | 3–1 | 1–2 | 2–0 | — | 2–0 |
| Zorya Luhansk | 1–0 | 2–1 | 2–2 | 2–1 | 1–0 | 1–1 | 1–2 | 4–2 | 3–0 | 5–1 | 1–4 | 1–2 | 1–1 | — |

Source: uafootball.net.ua
Legend: Blue = home team win; Yellow = draw; Red = away team win.

=== Positions by round ===
The following table represents the teams position after each round in the competition.

| Team ╲ Round | 1 | 2 | 3 | 4 | 5 | 6 | 7 | 8 | 9 | 10 | 11 | 12 | 13 | 14 | 15 | 16 | 17 | 18 | 19 | 20 | 21 | 22 | 23 | 24 | 25 | 26 |
|---|---|---|---|---|---|---|---|---|---|---|---|---|---|---|---|---|---|---|---|---|---|---|---|---|---|---|
| FC Dynamo Kyiv | 6 | 3 | 4 | 3 | 3 | 3 | 3 | 2 | 2 | 1 | 1 | 1 | 1 | 1 | 1 | 1 | 1 | 1 | 1 | 1 | 1 | 1 | 1 | 1 | 1 | 1 |
| Shakhtar Donetsk | 2 | 1 | 2 | 1 | 1 | 1 | 2 | 3 | 3 | 3 | 3 | 3 | 2 | 2 | 2 | 2 | 2 | 2 | 2 | 2 | 2 | 3 | 2 | 2 | 2 | 2 |
| Dnipro | 3 | 2 | 1 | 2 | 2 | 2 | 1 | 1 | 1 | 2 | 2 | 2 | 3 | 3 | 3 | 3 | 3 | 3 | 3 | 3 | 3 | 2 | 3 | 3 | 3 | 3 |
| Zorya Luhansk | 10 | 14 | 10 | 7 | 11 | 10 | 9 | 6 | 6 | 4 | 4 | 4 | 7 | 6 | 4 | 4 | 4 | 4 | 4 | 4 | 4 | 4 | 4 | 4 | 4 | 4 |
| Vorskla Poltava | 11 | 13 | 13 | 6 | 9 | 7 | 4 | 5 | 5 | 6 | 7 | 6 | 8 | 8 | 8 | 7 | 7 | 7 | 7 | 6 | 6 | 5 | 5 | 5 | 5 | 5 |
| Metalist Kharkiv | 4 | 5 | 8 | 5 | 5 | 8 | 10 | 7 | 7 | 8 | 5 | 8 | 6 | 4 | 5 | 5 | 5 | 5 | 5 | 5 | 5 | 6 | 6 | 6 | 6 | 6 |
| Volyn Lutsk | 5 | 6 | 9 | 12 | 8 | 5 | 7 | 9 | 10 | 10 | 9 | 7 | 5 | 7 | 7 | 8 | 6 | 6 | 6 | 7 | 8 | 8 | 7 | 7 | 7 | 7 |
| Metalurh Donetsk | 12 | 8 | 6 | 8 | 10 | 11 | 8 | 10 | 8 | 7 | 10 | 10 | 10 | 10 | 10 | 9 | 9 | 9 | 8 | 8 | 7 | 7 | 8 | 8 | 8 | 8 |
| Metalurh Zaporizhzhia | 13 | 7 | 5 | 9 | 6 | 9 | 11 | 11 | 11 | 11 | 11 | 12 | 12 | 11 | 11 | 11 | 11 | 10 | 10 | 10 | 10 | 10 | 9 | 10 | 10 | 9 |
| Olimpik Donetsk | 14 | 9 | 7 | 11 | 7 | 4 | 5 | 4 | 4 | 5 | 6 | 5 | 4 | 5 | 6 | 6 | 8 | 8 | 9 | 9 | 9 | 9 | 10 | 9 | 9 | 10 |
| Chornomorets Odesa | 1 | 4 | 3 | 4 | 4 | 6 | 6 | 8 | 9 | 9 | 8 | 9 | 9 | 9 | 9 | 10 | 10 | 11 | 11 | 11 | 11 | 11 | 11 | 11 | 11 | 11 |
| Hoverla Uzhhorod | 7 | 11 | 11 | 13 | 13 | 13 | 13 | 12 | 13 | 12 | 12 | 11 | 11 | 12 | 12 | 12 | 12 | 12 | 12 | 12 | 12 | 12 | 12 | 12 | 12 | 12 |
| Karpaty Lviv | 8 | 12 | 14 | 10 | 12 | 12 | 12 | 13 | 12 | 14 | 14 | 14 | 13 | 13 | 13 | 14 | 14 | 14 | 14 | 14 | 13 | 14 | 13 | 13 | 13 | 13 |
| Illichivets Mariupol | 9 | 10 | 12 | 14 | 14 | 14 | 14 | 14 | 14 | 13 | 13 | 13 | 14 | 14 | 14 | 13 | 13 | 13 | 13 | 13 | 14 | 13 | 14 | 14 | 14 | 14 |

== Season statistics ==
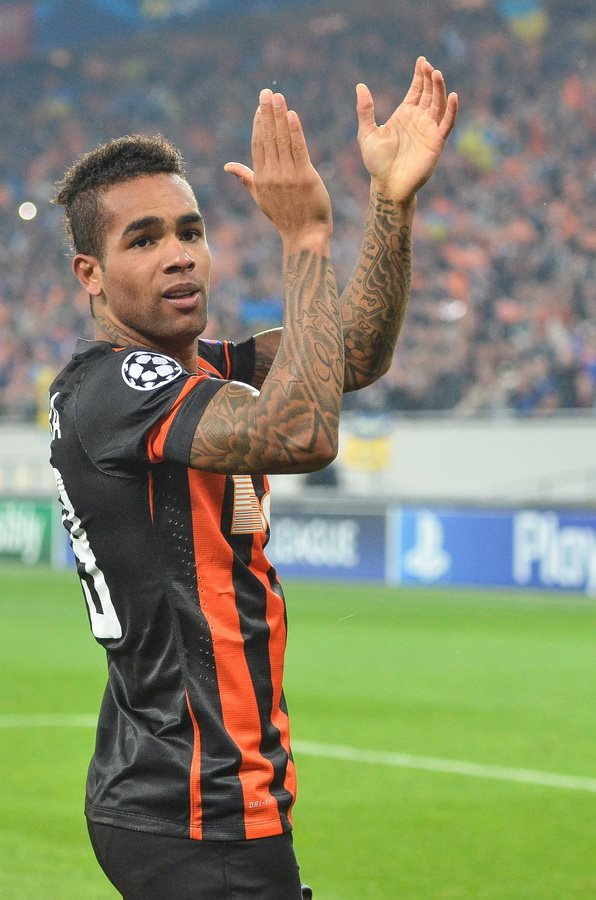
Teixeira

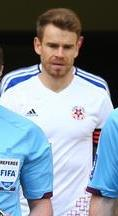
Bicfalvi

in 2014

=== Top goalscorers ===
As of matches played on 30 May 2015.

| Rank | Player | Club | Goals (pen.) |
|---|---|---|---|
| 1 | (Brazil) Alex Teixeira | Shakhtar Donetsk | 17 (1) |
| 1 | (Romania) Eric Bicfalvi | Volyn Lutsk | 17 (4) |
| 3 | (Ukraine) Artem Kravets | Dynamo Kyiv | 15 |
| 4 | (Ukraine) Andriy Yarmolenko | Dynamo Kyiv | 14 (3) |
| 5 | (Croatia) Nikola Kalinić | Dnipro Dnipropetrovsk | 12 (2) |
| 6 | (Ukraine) Oleksandr Hladkyi | Shakhtar Donetsk | 11 |
| 7 | (Brazil) Luiz Adriano | Shakhtar Donetsk | 9 (1) |
| 7 | (Serbia) Đorđe Lazić | Metalurh Donetsk | 9 (2) |
| 9 | (Ukraine) Pylyp Budkivskyi | Zorya Luhansk | 8 |
| 9 | (Ukraine) Oleksandr Kovpak | Vorskla Poltava | 8 (1) |
| 9 | (Serbia) Željko Ljubenović | Zorya Luhansk | 8 (1) |
| 9 | (Ukraine) Yevhen Seleznyov | Dnipro Dnipropetrovsk | 8 (1) |
| 9 | (Brazil) Cleiton Xavier (Note: During the winter break Cleiton Xavier signed with Palmeiras.) | Metalist Kharkiv | 8 (3) |

=== Hat-tricks ===
| Player | For | Against | Result | Date |
|---|---|---|---|---|
| (Ukraine) Artem Kravets | Dynamo Kyiv | Illichivets Mariupol | 4–1 | 17 August 2014 |
| (Portugal) Bruno Gama | Dnipro Dnipropetrovsk | Metalist Kharkiv | 5–2 | 13 September 2014 |
| (Brazil) Cleiton Xavier | Metalist Kharkiv | Illichivets Mariupol | 3–1 | 9 November 2014 |
| (Brazil) Jajá | Metalist Kharkiv | Zorya Luhansk | 4–2 | 30 November 2014 |
| (Ukraine) Serhiy Hryn | Illichivets Mariupol | Olimpik Donetsk | 4–1 | 30 May 2015 |

away win
home win
tie

== Awards ==
=== Monthly awards ===
| Month | UA-Football Player of the Month | | |
| Month | Player | Club | Reference |
|---|---|---|---|
| August | (Ukraine) Oleksandr Hladkyi | Shakhtar Donetsk | |
| September | (Ukraine) Andriy Yarmolenko | Dynamo Kyiv | |
| October | (Ukraine) Serhiy Sydorchuk | Dynamo Kyiv | |
| November | (Ukraine) Andriy Yarmolenko | Dynamo Kyiv | |
| March | (Ukraine) Andriy Yarmolenko | Dynamo Kyiv | |
| April | (Ukraine) Oleksandr Shovkovskyi | Dynamo Kyiv | |
| May | (Ukraine) Denys Boyko | Dnipro Dnipropetrovsk | |

=== Season awards ===
The laureates of the 2014–15 UPL season were:

- Best player: (Ukraine) Andriy Yarmolenko (Dynamo Kyiv)
- Best coach: (Ukraine) Serhii Rebrov (Dynamo Kyiv)
- Best goalkeeper: (Ukraine) Denys Boyko (Dnipro Dnipropetrovsk)
- Best arbiter: (Ukraine) Yevhen Aranovsky (Kyiv)
- Best young player: (Ukraine) Valeriy Luchkevych (Dnipro Dnipropetrovsk)
- Best goalscorer: (Brazil) Alex Teixeira (Shakhtar Donetsk)
- Fair play prize: (Ukraine) Zorya Luhansk

== See also ==
- 2014–15 Ukrainian First League
- 2014–15 Ukrainian Premier League Reserves and Under 19
- 2014–15 Ukrainian Second League
- 2014–15 Ukrainian Cup
- 2014–15 UEFA Europa League
- 2014–15 UEFA Champions League
