= FC Shakhtar-3 Donetsk =

- Full name: FC Shakhtar-3 Donetsk
- Founded: 2000
- Dissolved: 2015
- Ground: Kirsha Training Centre
- Chairman: Rinat Akhmetov
Home colours	Away colours

FC Shakhtar-3 Donetsk was a Ukrainian football team based in Donetsk, Ukraine. The team competed in the Ukrainian Second Division, and was considered the 3rd squad team or junior team from the FC Shakhtar Donetsk franchise.

== History ==
Like most tributary teams, the best players are sent up to the senior team or reserve team that competes in the Premier Reserve League. Meanwhile, developing other junior players for further call-ups. The team consists of Shakhtar's players whose average age is less than 20—In essence the club's future. The players usually progress to this team through the Shakhtar Donetsk youth system. Shakhtar-3 train alongside the first and youth teams at Kirsha Training Centre

After the 2014–15 season the club management commented to the media on the rumors of termination Shakhtar-3 Donetsk after the season and confirmed that decision.

== League and cup history ==
Season	Div.	Pos.	Pl.	W	D	L	GS	GA	P	Domestic Cup	Europe	Notes
2000–01	3rd "C"	8	30	11	7	12	32	38	40	1/16 finals Second League Cup		
2001–02	3rd "C"	7	34	17	4	13	53	40	55			
2002–03	3rd "C"	4	28	17	6	5	37	22	57			
2003–04	3rd "C"	4	30	18	1	11	55	36	55			
2004–05	3rd "C"	12	28	7	5	16	35	55	26			
2005–06	3rd "C"	11	24	8	2	14	32	38	26			
2006–07	3rd "B"	8	28	10	6	12	42	50	36			
2007–08	3rd "B"	7	34	15	8	11	57	50	53			
2008–09	3rd "B"	5	34	17	7	10	66	40	58			
2009–10	3rd "B"	7	26	10	6	10	33	29	36			
2010–11	3rd "B"	7	22	8	5	9	38	27	29			
2011–12	3rd "B"	8	26	10	1	15	45	56	31			
2012–13	3rd "B"	2	24	15	3	6	57	22	48			
2012–13	3rd "2"	3	34	20	5	9	72	37	65			Stage 2
2013–14	3rd	10	35	16	2	17	47	50	50			
2014–15	3rd	7	27	8	6	13	38	44	30			Withdrew

== Coaches ==
- 2000–2002 Viktor Hrachov
- 2001 Yuriy Hulyayev
- 2003–2005 Yevhen Yarovenko
- 2005–2006 Ihor Dybchenko
- 2006–2008 Ihor Leonov
- 2007 Serhiy Popov
- 2008–2009 Valeriy Rudakov
- 2009–2013 Serhiy Kovalyov
- 2010–2013 Oleksandr Funderat
- 2013–2015 Valeriy Rudakov
