= 2009–10 FC Kremin Kremenchuk season =

Kremin
2009–10 season
- President: Oleh Babaev
- Head coach: Yuriy Chumak
- Second League Group B: 2nd
- Ukrainian Cup: First Preliminary Round
- Top goalscorer: League: Klimov (10); All: Klimov (10)
- Highest home attendance: 3,500 v Hirnyk (29 August 2009)
- Lowest home attendance: 2,000 v Illichivets-2 (1 August 2009)
- Average home league attendance: 2,750

The 2009-10 season was FC Kremin Kremenchuk's 5th consecutive season in the Second League Group B.

== Key Dates ==
- 30 August 2009 – Kremin ends their 610-minute run without conceding a goal in home matches.
- 6 September 2009 – Kremin lose 3–1 against Tytan at Khimik Stadium in the Druha Liha B. Kremin's unbeaten run ends after 6 games.

== Players ==
=== Squad information ===
N	Pos.	Nat.	Name	Age	Since	App	Goals	Ends	Transfer fee	Notes
1	GK	(Ukraine)	Chumak (captain)	43	2008	36	0	2010		
12	GK	(Ukraine)	Oliynyk	40	2004	51	0			
2	DF	(Ukraine)	Dychko	53	2007	114	0			
2	DF	(Ukraine)	Lvov	34	2009	0	0			
3	DF	(Ukraine)	Ismailov	36	2009	0	0			
4	DF	(Ukraine)	Pronenko	41	2009	0	0			
5	DF	(Ukraine)	Kureleh	34	2008	28	0			
7	DF	(Ukraine)	Chernomor	41	2009	10	0			
7	DF	(Ukraine)	Shapoval	38	2009	0	0			
17	DF	(Ukraine)	Voloshyn	40	2006	73	3	2009		
8	MF	(Ukraine)	Tynynyk	41	2009	0	0			
10	MF	(Ukraine)	Sobko	38	2009	23	0			
11	MF	(Ukraine)	Mysyaylo	38	2009	0	0			
13	MF	(Ukraine)	Lapa	33	2009	0	0			
13	MF	(Ukraine)	Klimov	39	2008	29	8			
14	MF	(Ukraine)	Ivanov	38	2009	0	0			
14	MF	(Ukraine)	Apryshko	41	2007	53	5			
15	MF	(Ukraine)	Stepanchuk	38	2008	11	0			
18	MF	(Ukraine)	Tymchenko	40	2008	51	4			
6	FW	(Ukraine)	Kirienko	40	2009	12	2			
9	FW	(Ukraine)	Romanchuk	36	2009	0	0	2010		
11	FW	(Ukraine)	Sutula	39	2006	71	13			
16	FW	(Ukraine)	Zayko	38	2009	0	0			

- Last updated: 17 September 2009
- Source: Players, Players list on PFL site
- Ordered by Position than number.

==== In ====
No.	Pos.	Nat.	Name	Age	Moving from	Type	Transfer window	Ends	Transfer fee	Source
8	MF	(Ukraine)	Tynynyk	24	Arsenal Bila Tserkva		Summer			
2	DF	(Ukraine)	Dychko	36	Free agent		Summer		Free	
13	MF	(Ukraine)	Lapa	16	Kreminn-92		Summer			
16	FW	(Ukraine)	Zayko	21			Summer			
9	FW	(Ukraine)	Romanchuk	19	Vorskla Reserves	Loan	Summer	2010		
11	MF	(Ukraine)	Mysyaylo	21	Vorskla Reserves		Summer			
9	FW	(Ukraine)	Ivanov	19	Illichivets Reserves	Loan	Summer	2010		

==== Out ====
No.	Pos.	Nat.	Name	Age	Moving to	Type	Transfer window	Transfer fee	Source
	MF	(Ukraine)	Sumtsov	23	Helios Kharkiv	Contract ended	Summer		
		(Ukraine)	Hetman	21			Summer		

Last updated: 17 September 2009

== Team kit ==
The team kits are produced by Puma AG and the shirt sponsor is KremenchukMiaso «Кременчукм’ясо». The home and away kit was retained from previous seasons.

Home	Away

== Statistics ==
=== Squad stats ===
				Total			Ukrainian Second League		Ukrainian Cup	
No.	Pos.	Nat.	Name	Sts	App	Gls	App	Gls	App	Gls
1	GK	(Ukraine)	Chumak	12	12		11		1	
12	GK	(Ukraine)	Oliynyk		3		3			
2	DF	(Ukraine)	Dychko	3	10		9		1	
2	DF	(Ukraine)	Lvov		2		2			
3	DF	(Ukraine)	Ismailov		4		4			
4	DF	(Ukraine)	Pronenko	5	12		11		1	
5	DF	(Ukraine)	Kureleh	12	12		11		1	
6	FW	(Ukraine)	Kirienko	10	12	3	11	3	1	
7	DF	(Ukraine)	Chernomor	11	11	1	10		1	1
7	DF	(Ukraine)	Shapoval	9	9		9			
8	MF	(Ukraine)	Tynynyk	12	12		11		1	
9	FW	(Ukraine)	Romanchuk	4	10		9		1	
10	MF	(Ukraine)	Sobko	10	10		9		1	
11	MF	(Ukraine)	Mysyaylo	5	11		11			
11	FW	(Ukraine)	Sutula							
13	MF	(Ukraine)	Lapa		2		1		1	
13	MF	(Ukraine)	Klimov	9	9	6	9	6		
14	MF	(Ukraine)	Ivanov		4		4			
14	MF	(Ukraine)	Apryshko	6	9	3	9	3		
15	MF	(Ukraine)	Stepanchuk	9	12	1	11	1	1	
16	FW	(Ukraine)	Zayko	4	9	3	8	3	1	
17	DF	(Ukraine)	Voloshyn	8	10	1	10	1		
18	MF	(Ukraine)	Tymchenko	2	7		6		1	
	FW	(Ukraine)	Nemchenko		2		1		1	

Last updated: 28 September 2009
Source: Competitive matches
Ordered by
0 shown as blank

=== Top scorers ===
Includes all competitive matches. The list is sorted by shirt number when total goals are equal.

Position	Number	Name	Second League	Cup	Total
1	13	Vasyl Klimov	10 (1)	0	10
2	14	Evhen Apryshko	4	0	4
2	16	Dmytro Zayko	4	0	4
4	6	Ihor Kirienko	3	0	3
5	7	Ihor Chernomor	1	1	2
5	15	Serhiy Stepanchuk	2	0	2
5	17	Dmytro Voloshyn	2	0	2
8	10	Vitaliy Sobko	1	0	1
/	/	Own Goals	0	0	0
		TOTALS	27	1	28

Last updated on 26 October 2009

=== Disciplinary record ===
N	Pos.	Nat.	Name	Yellow card	Second yellow card	Red card	Notes
7	DF	(Ukraine)	Chernomor	4	0	1	
6	FW	(Ukraine)	Kirienko	4	0	0	
5	DF	(Ukraine)	Kureleh	2	0	0	
8	DF	(Ukraine)	Tynynyk	2	0	0	
9	FW	(Ukraine)	Romanchuk	2	0	0	
10	MF	(Ukraine)	Sobko	2	0	0	
15	MF	(Ukraine)	Stepanchuk	2	0	0	
1	GK	(Ukraine)	Chumak	1	0	0	
2	DF	(Ukraine)	Dychko	1	0	0	
3	DF	(Ukraine)	Ismailov	1	0	0	
7	DF	(Ukraine)	Shapoval	1	0	0	
11	MF	(Ukraine)	Mysyaylo	1	0	0	
13	MF	(Ukraine)	Klimov	1	0	0	
14	MF	(Ukraine)	Apryshko	1	0	0	
16	FW	(Ukraine)	Zayko	1	0	0	
17	DF	(Ukraine)	Voloshyn	1	0	0	
18	MF	(Ukraine)	Tymchenko	1	0	0	

Last updated: 26 October 2009
Source: Competitive matches
Only competitive matches
(yellow card) = Number of bookings; (second yellow card) = Number of sending offs after a second yellow card; (red card) = Number of sending offs by a direct red card.

=== Captains ===
Includes all competitive matches.

Position	Number	Name	Second League	Cup	Total
1	1	Roman Chumak	8	1	9
2	2	Volodymyr Dychko	3	0	3
3	13	Vasyl Klimov	2	0	2

Last updated on 26 October 2009

=== Start formations ===
Qnt	Formation	Match(es)
1	4-1-2-1-2	6
4	4-4-2	7-10

Last updated: 28 September 2009
Source: Match reports in Competitive matches
Only competitive matches.

=== Overall ===
Games played	14 (13 Second League, 1 Cup)
Games won	7
Games drawn	5
Games lost	2 (1 Second League, 1 Cup)
Goals scored	26
Goals conceded	16
Goal difference	+10
Yellow cards	25
Red cards	1
Worst discipline	Ihor Chernomor (1 (red card) , 2 (yellow card) )
Best result	4-0 (A) v Olkom – Druha Liha – 3 October 2009
Worst result	3-1 (A) v Tytan – Ukrainian Cup – 5 September 2009
Most appearances	6 players with 11 appearances
Top scorer	Vasyl Klimov (10 goals)
Points	26/42 (62%)

Last updated: 18 October 2009
Source: Competitive matches

== Club ==
=== Coaching staff ===
Position	Staff
Manager	(Ukraine) Yuriy Chumak
Club Doctor	(Ukraine) Vitaliy Stepanenko

Last updated: 21 August 2009
Source: Club

=== Other information ===
President	(Ukraine) Oleh Babayev
Director	(Ukraine) Andriy Nediak
Ground (capacity and dimensions)	Polytechnic (11,400 / 105x68)

Updated to match played 29 March 2010
Source: Directors

== Pre-season ==
26 June 2009	Vorskla Reserves	0–4	Kremin	Ltava, Poltava
16:00		(Report)	Kirienko 38'; Sobko 41'; Tymchenko 43'; Ponomarenko 48'

7 July 2009	Stal Dniprodzerzhynsk	2–2	Kremin	Metalurh, Dniprodzerzhynsk
		(Report)	Apryshko 40'; Kirienko 4?'

10 July 2009	Vorskla Reserves	0–3	Kremin	Ltava, Poltava
		(Report)	Tymchenko 38' 62'; Stepanchuk 68'

14 July 2009	Kremin	2–0	Kharkiv	Polytechnic, Kremenchuk
	Zayko 27'; Zaporozhets 90'	(Report)

== Friendly ==
8 September 2009	Metalist	5–0	Kremin	Metalist training base, Kharkiv
17:00	Edmar 3'; Obradović 17'; Berezovchuk 39'; Fredes 77'; Dević 85'	(Report)

25 January 2010	Kremin	4–0	Vorskla Reserves	KremenchukMiaso, Kremenchuk
	Humeniuk; Shapoval; Sutula; Borsh	(Report)

1 February 2010	Gelios	0–0	Kremin	Gelios-Arena, Kharkiv
		(Report)

== Ukrainian Second League ==
Kremin's fourth consecutive season in Druha Liha began on 17 July 2009 and ends on 22 May 2010.

=== Classification ===
Pos	Team	Pld	W	D	L	GF	GA	GD	Pts	Promotion or relegation
1	Tytan Armyansk	26	21	3	2	50	20	+30	66	Promoted to First League
2	Kremin Kremenchuk	26	15	9	2	41	21	+20	54	Playoff game
3	FC Poltava	26	16	6	4	34	16	+18	54	
4	Stal Dniprodzerzhynsk	26	15	6	5	38	23	+15	51	
5	Olimpik Donetsk	26	15	4	7	45	28	+17	49	

=== Playoff game ===
At the meeting of the Professional Football League of Ukraine after the season, it was confirmed that Ukrainian First League team FC Desna Chernihiv failed attestation and hence would have their license withdrawn. To allow an extra team to be promoted, the PFL determined that a playoff game between the 2nd placed teams from Druha Liha – Kremin Kremenchuk and Nyva Vinnytsia would determine the vacancy created. This playoff game was played June 28, 2010.

June 28, 2010
17:00 UTC+3

Kremin Kremenchuk	0 – 2	Nyva Vinnytsia
	Report	Kozban 12'; Nayko 48'

Central Stadium, Makariv
Attendance: 700
Referee: Dmytro Kutakov (Brovary)

=== Results summary ===
Overall								Home						Away					
Pld	W	D	L	GF	GA	GD	Pts	W	D	L	GF	GA	GD	W	D	L	GF	GA	GD
25	14	9	2	39	20	+19	51	9	3	0	21	7	+14	5	6	2	18	13	+5

Last updated: 15 May 2010.
Source: Second League Group B

=== Results by round ===
Round	1	2	3	4	5	6	7	8	9	10	11	12	13	14	15	16	17	18	19	20	21	22	23	24	25	26
Ground	A	H	A	H	A	H	A	H	A	H	A	H	A	H	A	H	A	H	A	H	A	H	A	H	A	H
Result	D	W	D	W	W	W	L	D	D	W	W	W	D	W	W	W	W	D	D	D	D	W	L	W	W	
Position	7	4	6	5	4	2	3	3	2	2	2	2	2	3	3	2	4	2	2	4	3	2	4	3	3	

Updated to match(es) played on 23 May 2010. Source:
A = Away; H = Home; W = Win; D = Draw; L = Loss
Notes: Match 25 is technical win, since opposing club was expelled from the league due to the inability to pay the spring season dues

=== Matches ===
All kickoff times are in EST.

25 July 2009 Round 1	Sumy	1–1	Kremin	Yuvileiny, Sumy
18:00	Sychov 47'; Tyechko (yellow card) 52'; Krokhmal (yellow card) 80'	(Report)	Dychko (yellow card) 7'; Chernomor (yellow card) 31'; Kirienko 55'; Romanchuk (yellow card) 75'; Tymchenko (yellow card) 84'	Attendance: 1,500; Referee: Ivan Bondar (Kyiv)

1 August 2009 Round 2	Kremin	2–0	Illichivets-2	Polytechnic, Kremenchuk
17:00	Stepanchuk (yellow card) 9'; Kirienko (yellow card) 20'; Koroliov 45+1' (o.g.); Chernomor (red card) 48'; Klimov 65'	(Report)	Ivanov (yellow card) 36'; Kurov (yellow card) 50'; Bushuev (yellow card) 76'; Peredriy (yellow card) 80'	Attendance: 2,000; Referee: Ihor Pashal (Kherson)

9 August 2009 Round 3	Poltava	1–1	Kremin	Lokomotiv, Poltava
18:00	Romanov (yellow card) 28'; Nikanovych 40'	(Report)	Kirienko (yellow card) 43'; Kureleh (yellow card) 63'; Voloshyn 78'	Attendance: 500; Referee: Dmytro Kozorezov (Serhiivka)

15 August 2009 Round 4	Kremin	2–0	Metalurh-2	Polytechnic, Kremenchuk
17:00	Kirienko 13'; Chernomor (yellow card) 51'; Tynynyk (yellow card) 60'; Apryshko 90+2'	(Report)	Stoliarenko (yellow card) 82'	Attendance: 2,000; Referee: Oleksandr Bilokur (Kurakhove)

22 August 2009 Round 5	Hirnyk-Sport	1–2	Kremin	Yunist, Komsomolsk
17:00	Yaroshenko (yellow card) 25' (yellow-red card) 27'; Turchyn (yellow card) 58'; Sharko (yellow card) 64'; Tkachenko 69'; Malynochka (yellow card) 77'; Kravchenko (yellow card) 85'	(Report)	Sobko (yellow card) 27'; Mysyaylo (yellow card) 31'; Klimov 36'; Apryshko (yellow card) 40'; Stepanchuk 55'	Attendance: 700; Referee: Serhiy Tolmachov (Mariupol)

29 August 2009 Round 6	Kremin	4–1	Hirnyk	Polytechnic, Kremenchuk
17:00	Klimov 47' 73'; Zayko (yellow card) 65' (goal) 77'; Kirienko 80'	(Report)	Yariukhin (yellow card) 33'; Arbuzov 85'; Mukan (yellow card) 90+2'	Attendance: 3,500; Referee: Anatoliy Zhabchenko (Simferopol)

5 September 2009 Round 7	Tytan	3–1	Kremin	Khimik, Armyansk
16:00	Bezdolnyi 4'; Panin 36'; Vizyonok 42'	(Report)	Klimov 8'	Attendance: 1,600; Referee: Maksym Kozyriats'kyi (Zaporizhia)

12 September 2009 Round 8	Kremin	1–1	Shakhtar	Polytechnic, Kremenchuk
16:00	Zayko 66'	(Report)	Kosiak 77'	Attendance: 2,500; Referee: Oleksandr Omelchenko (Sloviansk)

18 September 2009 Round 9	Olimpik	2–2	Kremin	Olimpik, Donetsk
16:00	Shavrin 12'; Bohdanov (yellow card) 56' (goal) 58'	(Report)	Zayko 36'; Apryshko 77'; Ismailov (yellow card) 87'	Attendance: 300; Referee: Vitaliy Romanov (Dnipropetrovsk)

27 September 2009 Round 10	Kremin	2–1	Shakhtar-3	Polytechnic, Kremenchuk
16:00	Apryshko 14'; Chernomor (yellow card) 43'; Klimov 62'; Kirienko (yellow card) 66'	(Report)	Zaika (yellow card) 30' (goal) 52'; Kisil (red card) 35'; Drachenko (yellow card) 61'	Attendance: 3,000; Referee: Oleksiy Moskalenko (Kryvyi Rih)

3 October 2009 Round 11	Olkom	0–4	Kremin	Oleh Oleksenko Spartak Stadium, Melitopol
16:00	Tkachov (yellow card) 38'	(Report)	Romanchuk (yellow card) 16'; Klimov 20'; Shapoval (yellow card) 34'; Sobko (yellow card) 40' (goal) 66'; Apryshko 61'; Zayko 78'	Attendance: 1,000; Referee: Oleksandr Pavliuk (Kyiv)

10 October 2009 Round 12	Kremin	2–1	Dnipro-75	Polytechnic, Kremenchuk
16:00	Klimov 1' (pen.), 90'; Kureleh (yellow card) 20'; Kirienko (yellow card) 26'	(Report)	Yarovenko (yellow card) 19' (goal) 58'; Bodnia (yellow card) 38'; Vasylenko (yellow card) 82'	Attendance: 3,000; Referee: Oleksandr Holovkov (Sievierodonetsk)

18 October 2009 Round 13	Stal	2–2	Kremin	Metalurh, Dniprodzerzhynsk
14:00	Trefilovskyi (yellow card) 13'; Buhaichuk (yellow card) 37'; Huturov (yellow card) 38' (goal) 67'; Kryvyi 80' (pen.) (yellow card) 90+2'; Shutov (yellow card) 82'	(Report)	Tynynyk (yellow card) 12'; Chumak (yellow card) 58'; Stepanchuk (yellow card) 64' (goal) 66'; Klimov 85' (yellow card) 85'	Attendance: 400; Referee: Ihor Zhorsan (Kherson)

24 October 2009 Round 14	Kremin	2–1	Sumy	Polytechnic, Kremenchuk
14:00	Voloshyn (yellow card) 3' (goal) 88'; Stepanchuk (yellow card) 17'; Chernomor 77' (yellow card) 78'	(Report)	Sychov (yellow card) 3'; Fatiy 61'; Lytvynenko (yellow card) 70'; Mashchenko (yellow card) 90+2'	Attendance: 3,000; Referee: Serhiy Prystula (Kyiv)

1 November 2009 Round 15	Illichivets-2	0–2	Kremin	Azovets, Mariupol
12:00	Omelchenko (yellow card) 34'; Nekrasov (yellow card) 72'; Peredriy (yellow card) 76'	(Report)	Kirienko 3'; Zayko (yellow card) 65'; Romanchuk 90'	Attendance: 100; Referee: Maksym Kozyriats'kyi (Zaporizhia)

20 March 2010 Round 16	Kremin	1–0	Poltava	CYFA Metalist, Kharkiv
12:00	Shapoval (yellow card) 49'; Stepanchuk 50'	(Report)	Bondarenko (yellow card) 10'; Plekhtiak (yellow card) 37'	Attendance: 500; Referee: Kateryna Monzul (Kharkiv)

7 April 2010 Round 17	Metalurh-2	1–2	Kremin	Tytan, Zaporizhia
15:00	Kravets (yellow card) 34'; Zozulia (yellow card) 36'; Hrychshuk 74'	(Report)	Sobko 39'; Stepanchuk (yellow card) 52'; Klimov (yellow card) 90+5' (goal) 90+5'	Attendance: 150; Referee: Oleksandr Holovkov (Sievierodonetsk)

3 April 2010 Round 18	Kremin	0–0	Hirnyk-Sport	Polytechnic, Kremenchuk
15:00		(Report)	Tkachenko (yellow card) 50'; Skliarenko (yellow card) 67'; Kravchenko (yellow card) 82'; Porubliov (yellow card) 85'	Attendance: 3,500; Referee: Henadiy Litvinov (Luhansk)

11 April 2010 Round 19	Hirnyk	0–0	Kremin	Zhovtneva school, Kryvyi Rih
15:00	Kolomiets (yellow card) 48'	(Report)		Attendance: 1,200; Referee: Mykola Kryvonosov (Kyiv)

18 April 2010 Round 20	Kremin	0–0	Tytan	Polytechnic, Kremenchuk
15:00	Stepanchuk (yellow card) 15'	(Report)	Ishmakov (yellow card) 57'; Martyshov (yellow card) 66'	Attendance: 4,500; Referee: Andriy Semenov (Dnipropetrovsk)

24 April 2010 Round 21	Shakhtar	–	Kremin	N.I. Horiushkin Memorial Stadium, Sverdlovsk
16:00		[ (Report)]

1 May 2010 Round 22	Kremin	–	Olimpik	Polytechnic, Kremenchuk
16:00		[ (Report)]

8 May 2010 Round 23	Shakhtar-3	–	Kremin	Shakhtar Sports Base, Krysha
16:00		[ (Report)]

15 May 2010 Round 24	Kremin	–	Olkom	Polytechnic, Kremenchuk
16:00		[ (Report)]

23 May 2010 Round 25	Dnipro-75	–	Kremin	Meteor, Dnipropetrovsk
16:00		[ (Report)]

29 May 2010 Round 26	Kremin	–	Stal	Polytechnic, Kremenchuk
16:00		[ (Report)]

Win Tie Loss

== Ukrainian Cup ==
=== First preliminary round ===
18 July 2009	Bastion	2–1	Kremin	Port, Illichivsk
17:00	Volchkov 4'; Pavlov (yellow card) 12'; Bredis 47'; Abramchenkov (yellow card) 80'	(Report)	Pronenko (yellow card) 46'; Sobko (yellow card) 86'; Chernomor 70'	Attendance: 800; Referee: Anatoliy Zhabchenko (Simferopol)

=== Disciplinary record ===
N	Pos.	Nat.	Name	Yellow card	Second yellow card	Red card	Notes
10	MF	(Ukraine)	Sobko	1	0	0	
4	DF	(Ukraine)	Pronenko	1	0	0	

Last updated: 19 July
Source: Competitive matches
Only competitive matches
(yellow card) = Number of bookings; (second yellow card) = Number of sending offs after a second yellow card; (red card) = Number of sending offs by a direct red card.
