= Yevhen =

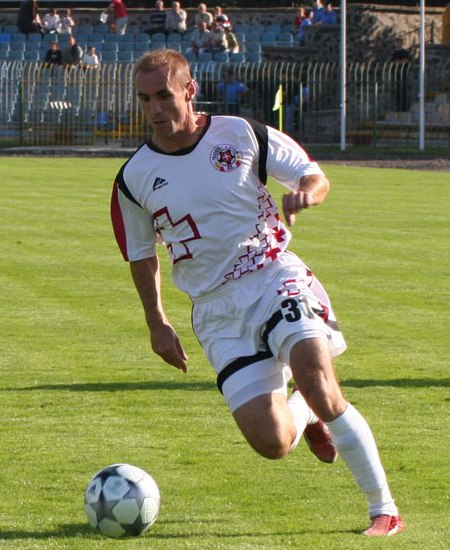
- Yevhen is a popular Ukrainian name. Pictured: Ukrainian footballer Yevhen Pichkur.
- Gender: Male
- Language: Ukrainian

Origin
- Language: Greek
- Origin: eugenḗs (εὐγενής)
- Meaning: 'well-born'

Other names
- Alternative spelling: Evhen
- Related names: Eugene, Yevgeny

Yevhen (Ukrainian: Євге́н [jeu̯ˈɦɛn]), also romanized Evhen, is a common Ukrainian given name, the equivalent of the English Eugene. Its Old Church Slavonic form Evgenii (Евгении) came from the Greek Eugénios (Εὐγένιος), from the adjective eugenḗs (εὐγενής), literally 'well-born'.

People with the given name include:

- Yevhen Adamtsevych, blind Ukrainian kobzar-bandurist
- Yevhen Apryshko (born 1985), Ukrainian footballer
- Yevhen Baryshnikov, a Ukrainian football defensive midfielder who plays for FC Kryvbas Kryvyi Rih
- Yevhen Braslavets, Ukrainian sailor and Olympic champion
- Yevhen Bredun, Ukrainian football defender who plays for FC Sevastopol
- Yevhen Budnik, Ukrainian football midfielder for Metalist Kharkiv
- Yevhen Cheberyachko, Ukrainian footballer
- Yevhen Chepurnenko, Ukrainian football striker who plays for FC Lviv
- Yevhen Chernenko, Ukrainian archaeologist
- Yevhen Drahunov, Ukrainian footballer
- Yevhen Fedorovych Stankovych, Ukrainian composer
- Yevhen Hrebinka, Ukrainian romantic, writer and poet
- Yevhen Hutsalo, Ukrainian writer and journalist
- Yevhen Khacheridi, Ukrainian footballer
- Evhen Khytrov (born 1988), Ukrainian boxer
- Yevhen Konoplyanka (born 1989), Ukrainian footballer
- Yevhen Konovalets (1891–1938), Ukrainian military commander and political leader of the Ukrainian nationalist movement
- Yevhen Kucherevskyi, Ukrainian football coach
- Yevhen Kushnaryov, Ukrainian politician
- Yevhen Lapinsky, Ukrainian volleyball player
- Yevhen Lemeshko, Ukrainian football coach
- Yevhen Levchenko, Ukrainian footballer
- Yevhen Lozynskyi, Ukrainian football defender who plays for FC Zorya Luhans
- Yevhen Lutsenko, Ukrainian footballer who plays for SC Tavriya Simferopol
- Yevhen Lysytsyn, Ukrainian footballer
- Yevhen Marchuk, Ukrainian statesman and politician
- Yevhen Novak, a Ukrainian footballer who plays for FC Dynamo-2 Kyiv
- Yevhen Pavlov, Ukrainian football striker who plays for FC Volyn Lutsk
- Yevhen Petrushevych, Ukrainian lawyer, politician and president of the Western Ukrainian National Republic
- Yevhen Pisotskyi (born 1987), Ukrainian footballer
- Yevhen Pokhlebayev, Ukrainian footballer
- Yevhen Pronenko (born 1984), Ukrainian footballer
- Yevhen Rudakov (1942–2011), Ukrainian football goalkeeper
- Yevhen Seleznyov (born 1985), Ukrainian footballer
- Yevhen Selin, Ukrainian football defender who plays for Vorskla Poltava
- Yevhen Semenenko, Ukrainian triple jumper
- Yevhen Shakhov (footballer born 1962), Ukrainian footballer
- Yevhen Shakhov (footballer born 1990), Ukrainian footballer
- Evhen Shapoval (born 1987), Ukrainian footballer
- Yevhen Shevchenko, Ukrainian football striker
- Yevhen Shmakov, Ukrainian football midfielder who is currently playing for Simurq PFC
- Evhen Tsybulenko (born 1972), Estonian professor of international law
- Yevhen Vynohradov, Ukrainian hammer thrower
- Yevhen Yevseyev (1987–2011), Ukrainian footballer
