= Dmytro Voloshyn (footballer, born February 1986) =

Ukrainian footballer

Personal information
- Full name: Dmytro Vitaliyovych Voloshyn
- Date of birth: 2 February 1986 (age 40)
- Place of birth: Oleksandriya, Ukrainian SSR, Soviet Union
- Height: 1.76 m (5 ft 9 1/2 in)
- Position: Defender

Team information
- Current team: Dąb Dębno
- Number: 77

Youth career
- 1999–2003: Krystal-Ametist Oleksandriya
- 2003–2005: Oleksandriya

Senior career*
| Years | Team | Apps | (Gls) |
| 2004–2006 | Oleksandriya | 34 | (3) |
| 2006–2010 | Kremin Kremenchuk | 95 | (12) |
| 2010–2011 | Stal Dniprodzerzhynsk | 33 | (1) |
| 2012–2016 | Kremin Kremenchuk | 103 | (2) |
| 2019– | Dąb Dębno | 121 | (3) |
- * Club domestic league appearances and goals as of 23 November 2024

Dmytro Vitaliyovych Voloshyn (Ukrainian: Дмитро Віталійович Волошин; born 2 February 1986) is a Ukrainian professional footballer who plays as a defender for Polish IV liga club Dąb Dębno.

== Club history ==
Dmytro Voloshyn began his football career at Krystal-Ametist club in Oleksandriya. During the 2004–05 and 2005–06 seasons he played for Olexandria. In 2006, he transferred to FC Kremin Kremenchuk. He left the club at the end of 2008–09 season but came back to Kremin before season started.

== Career statistics ==
As of 18 September 2009

| Club | Season | League | | | National cup | | Total | |
| Club | Season | Division | Apps | Goals | Apps | Goals | Apps | Goals |
|---|---|---|---|---|---|---|---|---|
| Krystal Olexandria | 2004–05 | Ukrainian Second League | 12 | 0 | 1 | 0 | 13 | 0 |
| Krystal Olexandria | 2005–06 | Ukrainian Second League | 19 | 3 | 1 | 0 | 20 | 3 |
| Krystal Olexandria | Total | | 31 | 3 | 2 | 0 | 33 | 3 |
| Kremin Kremenchuk | 2006–07 | Ukrainian Second League | 27 | 1 | 1 | 0 | 28 | 1 |
| Kremin Kremenchuk | 2007–08 | Ukrainian Second League | 31 | 5 | 2 | 0 | 33 | 5 |
| Kremin Kremenchuk | 2008–09 | Ukrainian Second League | 15 | 1 | 0 | 0 | 15 | 1 |
| Kremin Kremenchuk | 2009–10 | Ukrainian Second League | 8 | 0 | 0 | 0 | 8 | 0 |
| Kremin Kremenchuk | Total | | 81 | 7 | 3 | 0 | 84 | 7 |
| Career total | | | 112 | 10 | 5 | 0 | 8 | 10 |

== Honours ==
Dąb Dębno

- Regional league West Pomerania II: 2020–21, 2023–24
