= Volodymyr Ferents =

Ukrainian footballer

Personal information
- Full name: Volodymyr Ihorovych Ferents
- Date of birth: 12 July 1984 (age 42)
- Place of birth: Lviv, Ukraine
- Height: 1.83 m (6 ft 0 in)
- Position: Defender

Youth career
- 1998–2002: Karpaty Lviv

Senior career*
Years	Team	Apps	(Gls)
2002	Dynamo Lviv	13	(0)
2002–2004	Vorskla Poltava	2	(0)
2002–2004	→ Vorskla-2 Poltava	42	(1)
2004–2006	Oleksandriya	23	(0)
2006–2007	Kremin Kremenchuk	44	(0)
2008	FC Lviv	11	(0)
2008	Arsenal Bila Tserkva	16	(0)
- * Club domestic league appearances and goals

Volodymyr Ferents (Ukrainian: Володимир Ферентц; born 12 July 1984) is a Ukrainian former football defender.

== Club history ==
He has played for FC Kremin Kremenchuk in the Druha Liha B franchise for 2006–07 and first half of 2007–08 seasons. The rest of 2007–08 he played for FC Lviv. For 2008–09 season he plays for FC Arsenal Bila Tserkva. He also played for FC Karpaty Lviv, FC Dynamo Lviv, FC Vorskla Poltava and PFC Olexandria clubs.
