= Vyacheslav Ivanov (footballer) =

Ukrainian footballer

Personal information
- Full name: Vyacheslav Vyacheslavovich Ivanov
- Date of birth: 31 December 1987 (age 38)
- Place of birth: Mariupol, Ukraine
- Height: 1.76 m (5 ft 9 1/2 in)
- Position: Midfielder

Team information
- Current team: FC Kremin Kremenchuk
- Number: 14

Youth career
- CYSS Shakhtar

Senior career*
Years	Team	Apps	(Gls)
2004–2005	Shakhtar Donetsk	0	(0)
2004–2005	→ Shakhtar-2 Donetsk	2	(0)
2005	→ Shakhtar-3 Donetsk	2	(0)
2005–2008	Illichivets Mariupol	0	(0)
2005–2008	→ Illichivets-2 Mariupol	17	(0)
2009–2010	Kremin Kremenchuk	9	(0)
Total		30	(0)
- * Club domestic league appearances and goals as of 23 September 2009

Vyacheslav Vyacheslavovich Ivanov (Ukrainian: В'ячеслав В'ячеславович Іванов; born 31 December 1987) is a Ukrainian football midfielder currently playing for Ukrainian Second League club Kremin.

== Club history ==
Ivanov began his football career in CYSS Shakhtar in Donetsk. He signed with FC Kremin Kremenchuk during 2009 summer transfer window.

== Career statistics ==
As of 23 September 2009

Club	Season	League		Cup		Total	
Club	Season	Apps	Goals	Apps	Goals	Apps	Goals
Shakhtar-2	2004–05	2	0	0	0	2	0
Shakhtar-2	Total	2	0	0	0	2	0
Shakhtar-3	2004–05	2	0	0	0	2	0
Shakhtar-3	Total	2	0	0	0	2	0
Shakhtar Reserves	2004–05	13	2	0	0	13	2
Shakhtar Reserves	Total	13	2	0	0	13	2
Illichivets Reserves	2005–06	10	0	0	0	10	0
Illichivets Reserves	Total	10	0	0	0	10	0
Illichivets-2	2005–06	9	0	0	0	9	0
Illichivets-2	2007–08	8	0	0	0	8	0
Illichivets-2	Total	17	0	0	0	17	0
Illichivets Reserves	2008–09	4	0	0	0	4	0
Illichivets Reserves	Total	4	0	0	0	4	0
Kremin	2009–10	4	0	0	0	4	0
Kremin	Total	4	0	0	0	4	0
Career	Total	52	2	0	0	52	2
