= Anatoliy Tynynyk =

Ukrainian footballer

Personal information
- Full name: Anatoliy Viktorovych Tynynyk
- Date of birth: 11 September 1984 (age 42)
- Place of birth: Kirovohrad, Ukrainian SSR
- Height: 1.78 m (5 ft 10 in)
- Position: Midfielder

Team information
- Current team: FC Kremin Kremenchuk
- Number: 8

Youth career
- 2002–2003: Olympik Donetsk
- 2003–2004: Zirka Kirovohrad

Senior career*
Years	Team	Apps	(Gls)
2006	Zirka	13	(1)
2006–2008	Ros'	46	(1)
2009–	Kremin	93	(3)
- * Club domestic league appearances and goals as of 6 February 2014

Anatoliy Tynynyk (Ukrainian: Анатолій Вікторович Тининик; born 11 September 1984) is a Ukrainian football midfielder currently playing for Ukrainian Second League club Kremin.

== Club history ==
Evhen Apryshko began his football career in Olympik Donetsk in Donetsk. He transferred to FC Kremin Kremenchuk during 2009 summer transfer window.

== Career statistics ==
As of 22 September 2009

Club	Season	League		Cup		Total	
Club	Season	Apps	Goals	Apps	Goals	Apps	Goals
Zirka	2005–06	13	1	0	0	13	1
Zirka	Total	13	1	0	0	13	1
Ros'	2006–07	27	0	0	0	27	0
Ros'	2007–08	19	1	0	0	19	1
Ros'	Total	46	1	0	0	46	1
Kremin	2009–10	10	0	1	0	11	0
Kremin	Total	10	0	1	0	11	0
Career	Total	69	2	1	0	70	2
