= Eduard Ismailov =

Ukrainian footballer

Personal information
- Full name: Eduard Yuriyovych Ismailov
- Date of birth: 8 March 1990 (age 36)
- Place of birth: Makiivka, Soviet Union (now Ukraine)
- Height: 1.71 m (5 ft 7 1/2 in)
- Position: Defender

Youth career
- 2003–2007: Shakhtar Donetsk

Senior career*
Years	Team	Apps	(Gls)
2008–2009	Olimpik Donetsk	23	(0)
2009–2010	Kremin Kremenchuk	2	(0)
2012–2013	Ararat Yerevan	1	(0)
2013	Zhemchuzhyna Yalta	6	(0)
Total		29	(0)

International career^{‡}
2005–2006	Ukraine U16	15	(1)
- * Club domestic league appearances and goals as of 31 May 2013 ‡ National team caps and goals as of 25 September 2009

Eduard Yuriyovych Ismailov (Ukrainian: Едуард Юрійович Ісмайлов; born 8 March 1990) is a Ukrainian football defender.

== Club history ==
Eduard Ismailov began his football career at Shakhtar Youth in Donetsk. He signed with FC Kremin Kremenchuk during the 2009 summer transfer window.

== International career ==
=== Ukraine youth ===
Eduard Ismailov made his Ukraine Under-16s debut on 21 August 2005 in a match against Belarus Under-17.

== Career statistics ==
As of 25 September 2009

Club	Season	League			Cup		Total	
Club	Season	Division	Apps	Goals	Apps	Goals	Apps	Goals
Olimpik Donetsk	2007–08	Ukrainian Second League	6	0	0	0	6	0
Olimpik Donetsk	2008–09	Ukrainian Second League	17	0	0	0	17	0
Olimpik Donetsk	Total		23	0	0	0	23	0
Kremin Kremenchuk	2009–10	Ukrainian Second League	3	0	0	0	3	0
Kremin Kremenchuk	Total		3	0	0	0	3	0
Career total			26	0	0	0	26	0

== International career statistics ==
As of 25 September 2009

National team	Season	Apps	Goals
Ukraine U16	2005–06	15	1
Total		15	1

== Honours ==
=== International ===
- Victor Bannikov tournament – 2006
