= Sobko =

Sobko (Ukrainian: Собко) is a gender-neutral Ukrainian surname that may refer to

- Aleksandr Sobko (born 1982), Russian football player
- Sergei Sobko (born 1949), Russian politician
- Vadim Sobko (1912–1981), Ukrainian writer
- Vitaliy Sobko (born 1987), Ukrainian football midfielder
