= Yevhen Apryshko =

Ukrainian footballer (born 1985)

Personal information
- Full name: Yevhen Anatoliovych Apryshko
- Date of birth: 23 January 1985 (age 41)
- Place of birth: Kirovske, Ukrainian SSR
- Height: 1.78 m (5 ft 10 in)
- Position: Midfielder

Team information
- Current team: FC Kremin Kremenchuk
- Number: 14

Youth career
- 2001–2002: UOR Donetsk

Senior career*
Years	Team	Apps	(Gls)
2004	Stal Dniprodzerzhynsk	15	(2)
2005–2006	Tytan Armyansk	23	(2)
2007	Nafkom	14	(1)
2007–	Kremin	62	(8)
Total		114	(13)
- * Club domestic league appearances and goals as of 2 June 2010

Yevhen Anatoliovych Apryshko (Ukrainian: Євген Анатолійович Апришко; born 23 January 1985) is a Ukrainian football midfielder currently playing for Ukrainian Second League club Kremin.

== Club history ==
Evhen Apryshko began his football career in UOR Donetsk in Donetsk. He signed with FC Kremin Kremenchuk during 2007 summer transfer window.

== Career statistics ==
As of 2 June 2010

Club	Season	League		Cup		Total	
Club	Season	Apps	Goals	Apps	Goals	Apps	Goals
Stal Dniprodzerzhynsk	2003–04	7	1	0	0	7	1
Stal Dniprodzerzhynsk	2004–05	8	1	0	0	8	1
Stal Dniprodzerzhynsk	Total	15	2	0	0	15	2
Tytan Armyansk	2004–05	2	0	0	0	2	0
Tytan Armyansk	2005–06	21	2	0	0	21	2
Tytan Armyansk	Total	23	2	0	0	23	2
Nafkom	2006–07	10	1	2	0	12	1
Nafkom	2007–08	4	0	0	0	4	0
Nafkom	Total	14	1	2	0	16	1
Kremin	2007–08	23	2	0	0	23	2
Kremin	2008–09	30	2	1	0	30	2
Kremin	2009–10	9	4	0	0	9	4
Kremin	Total	62	8	1	0	63	8
Career	Total	114	13	3	0	117	13
