= Ihor Chernomor =

Ukrainian football defender

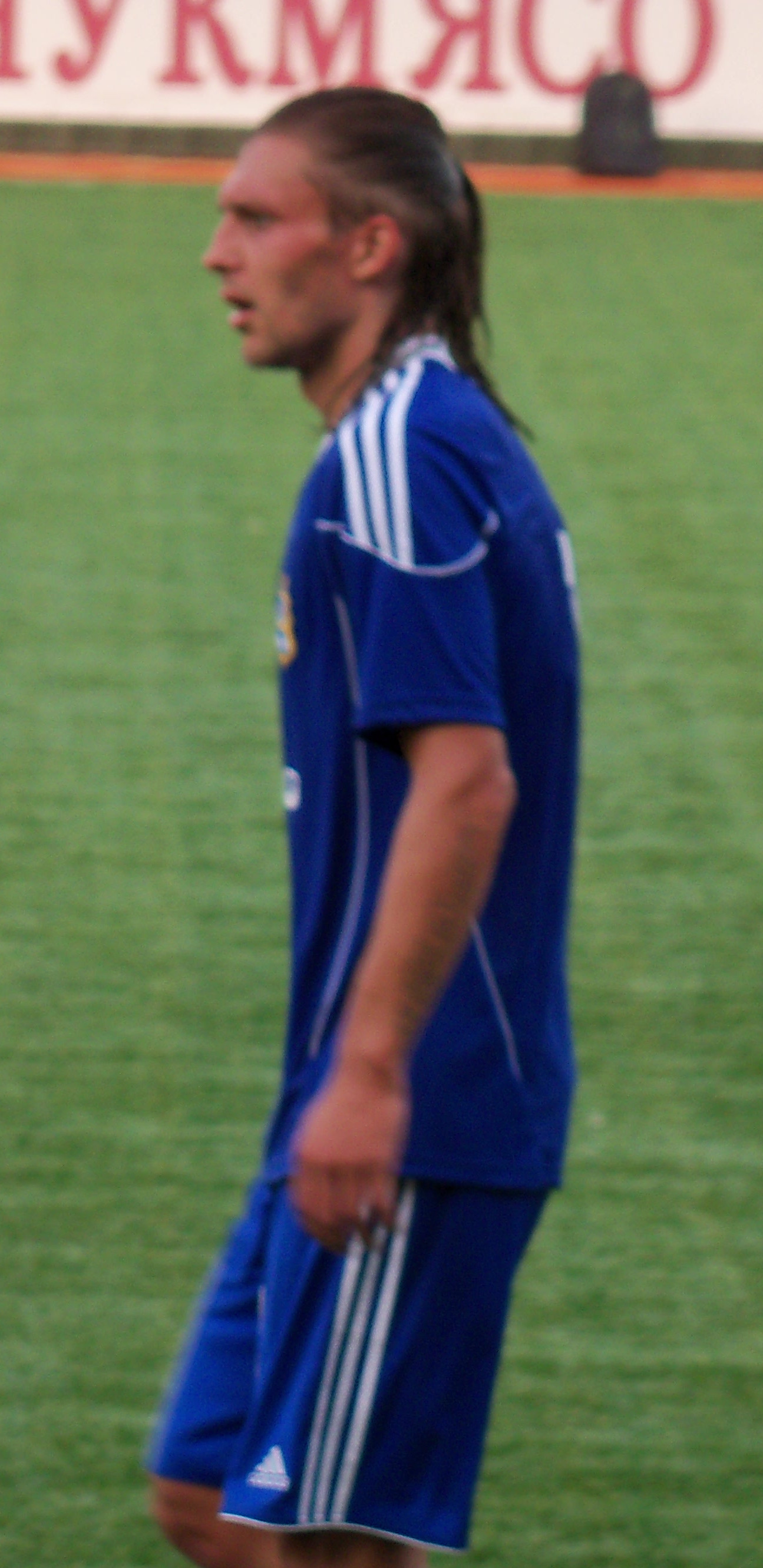

Personal information
- Full name: Ihor Serhiovych Chernomor
- Date of birth: 25 February 1985 (age 41)
- Place of birth: Kirovohrad, Ukraine
- Height: 1.75 m (5 ft 9 in)
- Position: Defender

Youth career
- 1998–1999: CYSS Nyva-Svitanok Vinnytsia
- 1999–2000: Zirka Kirovohrad
- 2000: Zirka-Lyceum Kirovohrad
- 2001: Shakhtar-2 Donetsk
- 2002–2003: Olimpik Kirovohrad

Senior career*
Years	Team	Apps	(Gls)
2001	Metalurh-2 Donetsk	2	(0)
2001–2002	Mashynobudivnyk Druzhkivka	9	(0)
2003	Zirka Kirovohrad	1	(0)
2003–2004	Olimpiya FC AES Yuzhnoukrainsk	23	(1)
2004–2005	Hirnyk-Sport Komsomolsk	26	(5)
2005–2006	Oleksandriia	8	(0)
2006	Spartak Sumy	3	(0)
2007	Iskra-Stal Rîbniţa	23	(1)
2008	Beșiktaș Chișinău	10	(1)
2008	Zirka Kirovohrad	4	(0)
2009–2010	Kremin Kremenchuk	42	(2)
2011	Shakhtar Sverdlovsk	7	(0)
2011–2012	Kremin Kremenchuk	17	(2)
2013	Krystal Kherson	5	(2)
2013	Kremin Kremenchuk	4	(0)
Total		110	(4)
- * Club domestic league appearances and goals

Ihor Serhiovych Chernomor (Ukrainian: Ігор Сергійович Черномор; born 25 February 1985) is a Ukrainian former football defender.

== Club history ==
Ihor Chernomor transferred to FC Kremin Kremenchuk during 2009 winter transfer window.

== Career statistics ==
As of 29 September 2009

Club	Season	League		Cup		Total	
Club	Season	Apps	Goals	Apps	Goals	Apps	Goals
Mashynobudivnyk	2001–02	9	0	0	0	9	0
Mashynobudivnyk	Total	9	0	0	0	9	0
Metalurh-2	2001–02	1	0	0	0	1	0
Metalurh-2	Total	1	0	0	0	1	0
Zirka	2002–03	1	0	0	0	1	0
Zirka	Total	1	0	0	0	1	0
Enerhiya	2003–04	23	1	0	0	23	1
Enerhiya	Total	23	1	0	0	23	1
Hirnyk-Sport	2004–05	19	2	0	0	19	2
Hirnyk-Sport	Total	19	2	0	0	19	2
Oleksandriia	2005–06	8	0	0	0	8	0
Oleksandriia	Total	8	0	0	0	8	0
Spartak Sumy	2006–07	3	0	0	0	3	0
Spartak Sumy	Total	3	0	0	0	3	0
Iskra-Stal	2006–07	14	1	0	0	14	1
Iskra-Stal	2007–08	11	0	0	0	11	0
Iskra-Stal	Total	25	1	0	0	25	1
Zirka	2008–09	4	0	1	0	4	0
Zirka	Total	4	0	1	0	4	0
Kremin	2008–09	10	0	0	0	10	0
Kremin	2009–10	7	0	1	1	8	1
Kremin	Total	17	0	1	1	18	1
Career	Total	110	4	2	1	112	5
