= Roman Chumak =

Ukrainian football goalkeeper

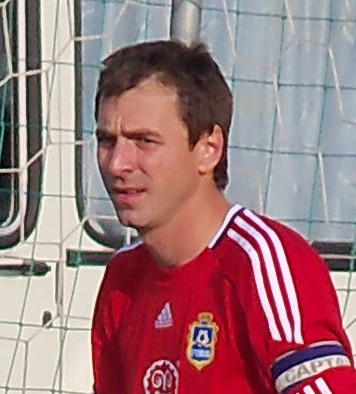
- Chumak in 2011

Personal information
- Full name: Roman Yuriovych Chumak
- Date of birth: 1 October 1982 (age 44)
- Place of birth: Dnipropetrovsk, Ukrainian SSR, Soviet Union
- Height: 1.86 m (6 ft 1 in)
- Position: Goalkeeper

Youth career
- 1998–1999: UFC Dnipropetrovsk

Senior career*
Years	Team	Apps	(Gls)
1999	Enerhetyk Burshtyn	0	(0)
2000	Prykarpattia-2 Ivano-Frankivsk	0	(0)
2000–2004	Hirnyk-Sport Komsomolsk	80	(0)
2004–2007	Vorskla Poltava	0	(0)
2004–2005	→ Vorskla-2 Poltava	9	(0)
2008–2009	Kremin Kremenchuk	49	(0)
2010	Oleksandria	1	(0)
2010–2012	Kremin Kremenchuk	24	(0)
2012–2013	Shakhtar Sverdlovsk	22	(0)
2013	Karlivka	17	(0)
2015–2018	Mykolaiv	53	(0)
2017–2018	→ Mykolaiv-2	11	(0)
- * Club domestic league appearances and goals

Roman Yuriovych Chumak (Ukrainian: Роман Юрійович Чумак; born 1 October 1982) is a Ukrainian former football goalkeeper.

He is a son of Yuriy Chumak.

== Club history ==
Roman Chumak began his football career in UFC Dnipropetrovsk in Dnipropetrovsk. He transferred to FC Kremin Kremenchuk during 2008 summer transfer window. In February 2010, Chumak left Kremin and moved to First League team Oleksandria.

== Career statistics ==
As of 2 June 2010

Club	Season	League		Cup		Total	
Club	Season	Apps	Goals	Apps	Goals	Apps	Goals
Enerhetyk	1999–00	0	0	0	0	0	0
Enerhetyk	Total	0	0	0	0	0	0
Chornohora	1999–00	0	0	0	0	0	0
Chornohora	Total	0	0	0	0	0	0
Hirnyk-Sport	2000–01	6	0	1	0	7	0
Hirnyk-Sport	2001–02	20	0	2	0	22	0
Hirnyk-Sport	2002–03	25	0	1	0	26	0
Hirnyk-Sport	2003–04	29	0	1	0	30	0
Hirnyk-Sport	Total	80	0	5	0	85	0
Vorskla-2	2004–05	9	0	0	0	9	0
Vorskla-2	Total	9	0	0	0	9	0
Vorskla	2004–05	0	0	1	0	1	0
Vorskla	2005–06	0	0	0	0	0	0
Vorskla	2006–07	0	0	1	0	1	0
Vorskla	2007–08	0	0	1	0	1	0
Vorskla	Total	0	0	3	0	3	0
Vorskla Reserves	2004–05	8	0	0	0	8	0
Vorskla Reserves	2005–06	25	0	0	0	25	0
Vorskla Reserves	2006–07	21	0	0	0	21	0
Vorskla Reserves	2007–08	17	0	0	0	17	0
Vorskla Reserves	Total	71	0	0	0	71	0
Kremin	2007–08	14	0	0	0	14	0
Kremin	2008–09	22	0	0	0	22	0
Kremin	2009–10	13	0	1	0	14	0
Kremin	Total	49	0	1	0	50	0
Oleksandria	2009–10	1	0	0	0	1	0
Total	1	0	0	0	1	0	
Career	Total	210	0	9	0	218	0
