= Serhiy Stepanchuk =

Ukrainian footballer

Personal information
- Full name: Serhiy Anatoliovych Stepanchuk
- Date of birth: 25 November 1987 (age 38)
- Place of birth: Dnipropetrovsk, Ukrainian SSR
- Height: 1.72 m (5 ft 7 1/2 in)
- Positions: Midfielder; striker

Team information
- Current team: FC Kremin Kremenchuk
- Number: 11

Youth career
- 2004–2001: YFC-2 Dnipropetrovsk
- 2001–2004: YFC Dnipropetrovsk

Senior career*
Years	Team	Apps	(Gls)
2008	Arsenal Kharkiv	36	(3)
2009–2011	Kremin	21	(3)
2011–2013	Arsenal Bila Tserkva	46	(4)
2013–	Kremin	3	(0)
- * Club domestic league appearances and goals as of 6 May 2013

Serhiy Anatoliovych Stepanchuk (Ukrainian: Сергій Анатолійович Степанчук; born 25 November 1987 in Dnipropetrovsk, Dnipropetrovsk Oblast) is a Ukrainian football midfielder, striker currently playing for Ukrainian Second League club Kremin.

== Club history ==
Serhiy Stepanchuk began his football career in YFC-2 in Dnipropetrovsk. He transferred to FC Kremin Kremenchuk during 2009 winter transfer window.

== Career statistics ==
As of 22 September 2009

Club	Season	League		Cup		Total	
Club	Season	Apps	Goals	Apps	Goals	Apps	Goals
Arsenal Kharkiv	2007–08	15	1	0	0	15	1
Arsenal Kharkiv	2008–09	21	2	1	0	21	2
Arsenal Kharkiv	Total	36	3	1	0	37	3
Kremin	2008–09	11	2	0	0	11	2
Kremin	2009–10	10	1	1	0	11	1
Kremin	Total	21	3	1	0	22	3
Career	Total	57	6	2	0	59	6
