= Zayko =

Zayko is a surname. Notable people with the surname include:

- Dmytro Zayko (born 1985), Ukrainian footballer
- Leonid Zayko (born 1948), Russian volleyball player
- Yakov Zayko (1940–2014), Russian journalist
