= Yevhen Pronenko =

Ukrainian footballer

Personal information
- Full name: Yevhen Viktorovych Pronenko
- Date of birth: 4 November 1984 (age 41)
- Place of birth: Dniprodzerzhynsk, Ukraine
- Height: 1.80 m (5 ft 11 in)
- Position: Defender

Youth career
- CYSS Nadiya
- 1999: SILKO Verkhnodniprovsk

Senior career*
Years	Team	Apps	(Gls)
2006	Elektrometalurh-NZF	12	(0)
2008	Dnipro-75	15	(0)
2009–2012	Kremin	19	(0)
Total		46	(0)
- * Club domestic league appearances and goals as of 25 September 2009

Yevhen Pronenko (Ukrainian: Євген Вікторович Проненко; born 4 November 1984) is a Ukrainian football defender.

== Club history ==
Pronenko began his football career in SILKO Verkhnodniprovsk in Verkhnodniprovsk. He signed with FC Kremin Kremenchuk during 2009 winter transfer window.

== Career statistics ==
As of 25 September 2009

Club	Season	League		Cup		Total	
Club	Season	Apps	Goals	Apps	Goals	Apps	Goals
Elektrometalurh-NZF	2006	12	0	0	0	12	0
Elektrometalurh-NZF	Total	12	0	0	0	12	0
Dnipro-75	2008–09	15	0	0	0	15	0
Dnipro-75	Total	15	0	0	0	15	0
Kremin	2008–09	9	0	0	0	9	0
Kremin	2009–10	10	0	1	0	11	0
Kremin	Total	19	0	1	0	20	0
Career	Total	46	0	1	0	47	0
