= Dmytro Zayko =

Ukrainian footballer

Personal information
- Full name: Dmytro Mykolaiovych Zayko
- Date of birth: 30 July 1985 (age 41)
- Place of birth: Pervomaisk, Ukraine
- Height: 1.86 m (6 ft 1 in)
- Position: Striker

Youth career
- 2000: CYSS Mykolaiv
- 2002: Olimpia Yuzhnoukrainsk

Senior career*
Years	Team	Apps	(Gls)
2002–2004	Enerhiya Yuzhnoukrainsk	8	(1)
2005–2007	Mykolaiv	61	(16)
2007–2008	Enerhiya Yuzhnoukrainsk	25	(5)
2008	Zirka Kirovohrad	5	(0)
2009–2010	Kremin Kremenchuk	34	(4)
2011–2012	Lan Shcherbani		
2013–2021	MFC Pervomaisk		
- * Club domestic league appearances and goals

Dmytro Mykolaiovych Zayko (Ukrainian: Дмитро Миколайович Зайко; born 30 July 1985) is a Ukrainian former football striker.

== Club history ==
Dmytro Zayko began his football career in CYSS Mykolaiv in Mykolaiv. He signed with FC Kremin Kremenchuk during 2009 summer transfer window.

== Career statistics ==
As of 21 September 2009

Club	Season	League		Cup		Total	
Club	Season	Apps	Goals	Apps	Goals	Apps	Goals
Enerhiya	2001–02	1	0	0	0	1	0
Enerhiya	2004–05	7	1	0	0	7	1
Enerhiya	Total	8	1	0	0	8	1
Mykolaiv	2004–05	12	3	0	0	12	3
Mykolaiv	2005–06	18	10	1	1	19	11
Mykolaiv	2006–07	31	3	1	0	32	3
Mykolaiv	Total	61	16	2	1	63	17
Enerhiya	2007–08	25	5	0	0	25	5
Enerhiya	Total	25	5	0	0	25	5
Zirka	2008–09	5	0	2	2	7	2
Zirka	Total	5	0	2	2	7	2
Kremin	2009–10	8	3	1	0	9	3
Kremin	Total	8	3	1	0	9	3
Career	Total	107	25	5	3	112	28
