= Yevhen Shapoval =

Ukrainian footballer

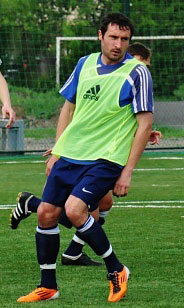
- Shapoval in 2011

Personal information
- Full name: Yevhen Vasylyovych Shapoval
- Date of birth: 16 August 1987 (age 39)
- Place of birth: Kharkiv, Ukrainian SSR
- Height: 1.79 m (5 ft 10 1/2 in)
- Position: Defender

Youth career
- 2001–2004: Metalist Kharkiv

Senior career*
Years	Team	Apps	(Gls)
2008	Zirka Kirovohrad	15	(0)
2009	Nyva Vinnytsia	6	(0)
2009–2011	Kremin Kremenchuk	32	(0)
2011	Metalurh Zaporizhzhia	0	(0)
2011–2012	Kremin Kremenchuk	26	(1)
2012	→ Avanhard Kramatorsk (loan)	8	(0)
2013	Arsenal Bila Tserkva	4	(0)
2013	Tytan Armiansk	4	(0)
2014	Myr Hornostayivka	8	(0)
2015	Lokomotyv Kupiansk	18	(6)
2016	Džiugas Telšiai	7	(0)
2016	Morzycko Moryń		
2017	Unia Solec Kujawski		
- * Club domestic league appearances and goals

Yevhen Vasylyovych Shapoval (Ukrainian: Євген Васильович Шаповал; born 16 August 1987) is a Ukrainian former professional footballer who played as a defender.

== Club history ==
Yevhen Shapoval began his football career in Metalist Youth in Kharkiv. He transferred to FC Kremin Kremenchuk during 2009 summer transfer window.

== Career statistics ==
As of 22 September 2009

Club	Season	League		Cup		Total	
Club	Season	Apps	Goals	Apps	Goals	Apps	Goals
Metalist Reserves	2006–07	13	0	0	0	13	0
Metalist Reserves	2007–08	22	0	0	0	22	0
Metalist Reserves	Total	35	0	0	0	35	0
Zirka	2008–09	15	0	3	0	18	0
Zirka	Total	15	0	3	0	18	0
Nyva	2008–09	6	0	0	0	6	0
Nyva	Total	6	0	0	0	6	0
Kremin	2009–10	8	0	0	0	8	0
Kremin	Total	8	0	0	0	8	0
Career	Total	64	0	3	0	67	0

== Honours ==
Unia Solec Kujawski

- IV liga Kuyavia-Pomerania: 2016–17
