= Stepanchuk =

Stepanchuk (Ukrainian: Степанчук) is a surname. Notable people with the surname include:

- Andrei Stepanchuk (born 1979), Belarusian race walker
- Serhiy Stepanchuk (born 1987), Ukrainian footballer
