= Vitaliy Sobko =

Ukrainian footballer

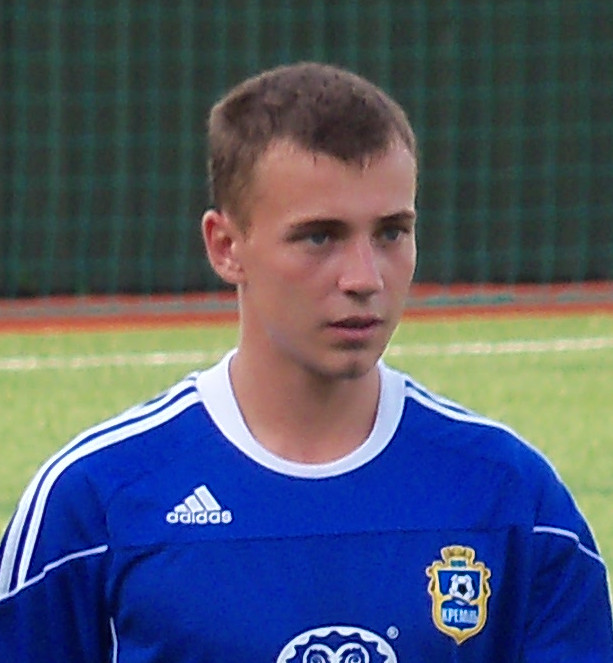

Personal information
- Full name: Vitaliy Ivanovych Sobko
- Date of birth: 27 July 1987 (age 39)
- Place of birth: Kharkiv, Ukrainian SSR
- Height: 1.76 m (5 ft 9 1/2 in)
- Position: Midfielder

Youth career
- 2003–2004: Metalist Kharkiv

Senior career*
Years	Team	Apps	(Gls)
2005–2006	Helios Kharkiv	13	(1)
2007	Kremin Kremenchuk	11	(0)
2007	Hazovyk-KhGV Kharkiv	15	(2)
2008	Helios Kharkiv	1	(0)
2009–2011	Kremin Kremenchuk	72	(11)
2012–2013	Avanhard Kramatorsk	42	(7)
2013–2014	Helios Kharkiv	28	(2)
2015	Kremin Kremenchuk	9	(0)
2015–2020	Avanhard Kramatorsk	123	(26)
- * Club domestic league appearances and goals as of 12 August 2020

Vitaliy Ivanovych Sobko (Ukrainian: Віталій Іванович Собко; born 27 July 1987) is a Ukrainian football midfielder.

== Club history ==
Vitaliy Sobko began his football career in Metalist Youth in Kharkiv. He transferred to FC Kremin Kremenchuk during 2009 winter transfer window.

== Career statistics ==
As of 22 December 2009

Club	Season	League		Cup		Total	
Club	Season	Apps	Goals	Apps	Goals	Apps	Goals
Helios	2005–06	13	1	0	0	13	1
Helios	Total	13	1	0	0	13	1
Kremin	2006–07	11	0	0	0	11	0
Kremin	Total	11	0	0	0	11	0
Hazovyk-KhGV	2007–08	15	2	0	0	15	2
Hazovyk-KhGV	Total	15	2	0	0	15	2
Helios	2008–09	1	0	0	0	1	0
Helios	Total	1	0	0	0	1	0
Kremin	2008–09	12	2	1	0	12	2
Kremin	2009–10	14	1	1	0	8	0
Kremin	Total	26	3	1	0	20	2
Career	Total	66	6	1	0	61	5

== Personal life ==
His older brother Aleksandr Sobko is also a footballer.
