= Serhiy Lapa =

Ukrainian footballer

Personal information
- Full name: Serhiy Volodymyrovych Lapa
- Date of birth: 19 August 1992 (age 34)
- Place of birth: Kremenchuk, Ukraine
- Height: 1.76 m (5 ft 9 1/2 in)
- Position: Midfielder

Youth career
- 2005–2008: Kremin-92
- 2008: BRW-ВІК
- 2008–2009: Kremin-92

Senior career*
Years	Team	Apps	(Gls)
2009–2010	Kremin	1	(0)
2012	Hirnyk-Sport	3	(0)

International career^{‡}
2008	Ukraine U-16	1	(0)
- * Club domestic league appearances and goals as of 21 September 2009 ‡ National team caps and goals as of 21 September 2009

Serhiy Volodymyrovych Lapa (Ukrainian: Сергій Володимирович Лапа; born 19 August 1992 in Kremenchuk, Poltava Oblast) is a Ukrainian football midfielder currently playing for Ukrainian Second League club Hirnyk-Sport.

== Club history ==
Serhiy Lapa began his football career in Kremin-92 in Kremenchuk. He signed with FC Kremin Kremenchuk during 2009 winter transfer window.

== International career ==
=== Ukraine youth ===
Serhiy Lapa made his Ukraine Under-16s debut on 4 April 2008 in a friendly against Turkey Under-16.

== Career statistics ==
As of 21 September 2009

Club	Season	League		Cup		Total	
Club	Season	Apps	Goals	Apps	Goals	Apps	Goals
Kremin	2009–10	1	0	1	0	2	0
Kremin	Total	1	0	1	0	2	0
Career	Total	1	0	1	0	2	0
