= FC Karpaty-2 Lviv =

Football Club Karpaty-2 Lviv
- Full name: FC Karpaty-2 Lviv
- Founded: 1997; 29 years ago 2023; 3 years ago (refounded)
- Dissolved: 2024

Football Club Karpaty-2 Lviv (Ukrainian: ФК Карпати-2 Львів) was the reserve team of Karpaty Lviv. It is considered their junior squad with most of the players under 20 years of age. In 2010-2012 the team participated in the championship of the Lviv Oblast.

== History ==
Karpaty-2 were originally formed in the Ukrainian Second League back in 1997. However, in 2001 FC Lviv that competed in the Ukrainian First League was merged with Karpaty and FC Lviv was replaced with Karpaty-2, while the original team in the Second League was renamed to Karpaty-3.

At the end of 2003–04 season Karpaty Lviv were relegated which automatically caused its other two teams to move down the championship leagues. Coincidentally, the Premier League introduced the competition for reserves parallel to its league for 2004–05 season. Since returning to the Premiers for 2006–07 Karpaty introduced its own Reserve team based on the withdrawn Karpaty-3 in that championship.

In 2010 Karpaty withdrew one of its squads (Karpaty-2) from the professional ranks and placed it in the regional competition where it played until 2012.

== League and cup history ==
Season	Div.	Pos.	Pl.	W	D	L	GS	GA	P	Domestic Cup	Europe	Notes
1997–98	3rd "A"	3	34	16	5	13	54	50	53	1/256 finals		
1998–99	3rd "A"	8	28	11	6	11	30	40	39	Did not enter		
1999-00	3rd "A"	8	30	12	6	12	43	43	42	1/32 finals Second League Cup		
2000–01	3rd "A"	8	30	13	3	14	45	35	42	1/16 finals Second League Cup		
In 2001 Karpaty merged with FC Lviv and Karpaty-2 took over the place of the last
2001–02	2nd	12	34	12	6	16	41	52	42			
2002–03	2nd	5	34	10	11	13	34	38	41			
2003–04	2nd	16	34	8	9	17	37	48	33			Relegated
2004–05	3rd "A"	3	28	15	5	8	47	30	50			
2005–06	3rd "A"	5	28	14	4	10	39	36	46			
2006–07	3rd "A"	8	28	10	9	9	41	35	39			
2007–08	3rd "A"	15	30	7	3	20	33	53	24			
2008–09	3rd "A"	14	32	9	7	16	28	43	34			
2009–10	3rd "A"	10	20	5	1	14	17	43	16			
2010–	competes in the Lviv Oblast											
2023–24	3rd	5	26	11	6	9	35	39				Withdrawn after the season

== See also ==
- FC Karpaty Lviv
- FC Karpaty-3 Lviv
- FC SKA-Orbita Lviv
