= Ivan Lvov =

Ukrainian footballer

Personal information
- Full name: Ivan Volodymyrovych Lvov
- Date of birth: 15 November 1991 (age 34)
- Place of birth: Kremenchuk, Ukraine
- Height: 1.82 m (5 ft 11 1/2 in)
- Position: Defender

Team information
- Current team: FC Kremin Kremenchuk
- Number: 2

Youth career
- 2004–2008: Kremin-91

Senior career*
| Years | Team | Apps | (Gls) |
| 2009– | Kremin | 4 | (0) |
| Total | | 4 | (0) |
- * Club domestic league appearances and goals as of 17 September 2009

Ivan Volodymyrovych Lvov (Ukrainian: Львов Іван Володимирович; born 15 November 1991) is a Ukrainian football defender currently playing for Ukrainian Second League club Kremin.

== Club history ==
Ivan Lvov began his football career in Kremin-91 in Kremenchuk. He signed with FC Kremin Kremenchuk during 2009 winter transfer window.

== Career statistics ==
As of 17 September 2009

| Club | Season | League | | Cup | | Total | |
| Club | Season | Apps | Goals | Apps | Goals | Apps | Goals |
|---|---|---|---|---|---|---|---|
| Kremin | 2009–10 | 4 | 0 | 0 | 0 | 4 | 0 |
| Kremin | Total | 4 | 0 | 0 | 0 | 4 | 0 |
| Career | Total | 4 | 0 | 0 | 0 | 4 | 0 |
