= Vasyl Klimov =

Ukrainian footballer

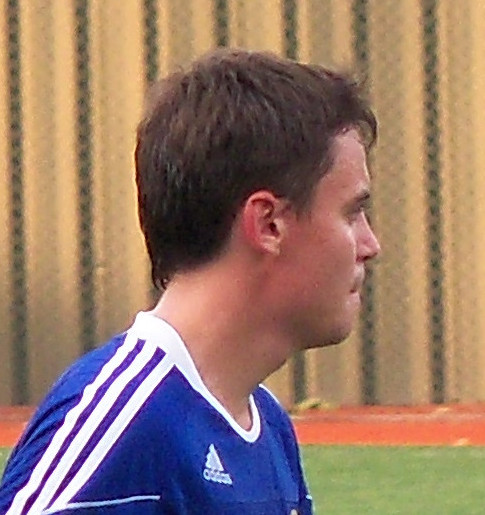

Personal information
- Full name: Vasyl Ihorovych Klimov
- Date of birth: 26 June 1986 (age 40)
- Place of birth: Kremenchuk, Ukrainian SSR
- Height: 1.78 m (5 ft 10 in)
- Position: Midfielder

Youth career
- –2003: Atlanta-86 Kremenchuk

Senior career*
Years	Team	Apps	(Gls)
2003–2006	Dnipro Dnipropetrovsk	0	(0)
2003–2004	→ Dnipro-2 Dnipropetrovsk	26	(3)
2006–2008	Vorskla Poltava	1	(0)
2008–2010	Kremin Kremenchuk	52	(21)
2010	Nyva Vinnytsia	17	(2)
2011	Sumy	7	(0)
2011–2012	Kremin Kremenchuk	25	(2)
2012	Zhemchuzhyna Yalta	11	(0)
Total		139	(28)
- * Club domestic league appearances and goals

Vasyl Ihorovych Klimov (Ukrainian: Василь Ігорович Клімов; born 26 June 1986) is a Ukrainian football midfielder.

== Club history ==
Vasyl Klimov began his football career in Atlanta-86 school in Kremenchuk. At age 17 he was signed by Dnipro-2 Dnipropetrovsks. He transferred to FC Kremin Kremenchuk during 2008 summer transfer window.

== Career statistics ==
As of 15 September 2009

Club	Season	League		Cup		Total	
Club	Season	Apps	Goals	Apps	Goals	Apps	Goals
Dnipro-2 Dnipropetrovsk	2003–04	26	3	0	0	26	3
Dnipro-2 Dnipropetrovsk	Total	26	3	0	0	26	3
Dnipro Dnipropetrovsk Reserves	2004–05	21	1	0	0	21	1
Dnipro Dnipropetrovsk Reserves	2005–06	26	6	1	0	27	6
Dnipro Dnipropetrovsk Reserves	Total	47	7	1	0	48	7
Vorskla Poltava Reserves	2006–07	21	2	0	0	21	2
Vorskla Poltava Reserves	2007–08	25	7	3	0	25	7
Vorskla Poltava Reserves	Total	46	9	3	0	49	9
Vorskla Poltava	2007–08	1	0	0	0	1	0
Vorskla Poltava	Total	1	0	0	0	1	0
Kremin	2008–09	29	8	1	0	30	8
Kremin	2009–10	6	5	0	0	6	5
Kremin	Total	35	13	1	0	36	13
Career	Total	155	32	5	0	160	32
