= Ivan Romanchuk =

Ukrainian footballstriker (born 1990)

Personal information
- Full name: Ivan Valentynovych Romanchuk
- Date of birth: 7 March 1990 (age 36)
- Place of birth: Ivano-Frankivsk, Ukrainian SSR
- Height: 1.87 m (6 ft 2 in)
- Position: Striker

Youth career
- 2004–2007: FC Spartak Ivano-Frankivsk

Senior career*
Years	Team	Apps	(Gls)
2008–2009	Vorskla Reserves	34	(4)
2009–2010	Kremin	7	(0)
2010	Helios Kharkiv	12	(2)
2012	Zhemchuzhyna Yalta	18	(1)
Total		71	(7)
- * Club domestic league appearances and goals as of 10 May 2013

Ivan Valentynovych Romanchuk (Ukrainian: Іван Валентинович Романчук; born 7 March 1990) is a Ukrainian football striker.

== Club history ==
Ivan Romanchuk began his football career in Vorskla Reserves in Poltava. He transferred to FC Kremin Kremenchuk during 2009 summer transfer window on a half-year loan.

== Career statistics ==
As of 17 September 2009

Club	Season	League		Cup		Total	
Club	Season	Apps	Goals	Apps	Goals	Apps	Goals
Vorskla Reserves	2007–08	9	0	0	0	9	0
Vorskla Reserves	2008–09	25	4	0	0	25	4
Vorskla Reserves	Total	34	4	0	0	41	4
Kremin	2009–10	7	0	1	0	8	0
Kremin	Total	7	0	1	0	8	0
Career	Total	41	4	1	0	42	4
