= FC Metalurh-2 Zaporizhzhia =

Ukrainian football team

Metalurh-2 Zaporizhzhia
- Full name: Football Club Metalurh-2 Zaporizhzhia
- Founded: 1998
- Ground: "Titan", "Spartak-ZIGMU"
- Capacity: ?, 6000
- Manager: Andriy Zubchenko
- League: Ukrainian Second League
- 2022–23: Ukrainian Second League, 8nd of 10
Home colours	Away colours

Football Club Metalurh-2 Zaporizhzhia is a Ukrainian football team based in Zaporizhzhia, Ukraine. The team has been featured regularly in the Ukrainian Second Division it serves as a junior team for the FC Metalurh Zaporizhzhia franchise. Like most tributary teams, the best players are sent up to the senior team, meanwhile developing other players for further call-ups.

== Players ==
=== Current squad ===
As of 28 July 2023

Note: Flags indicate national team as defined under FIFA eligibility rules; some limited exceptions apply. Players may hold more than one non-FIFA nationality.

No.	Pos.	Nation	Player
1	GK	(Ukraine) UKR	Hordiy Nikolayenko
5	MF	(Ukraine) UKR	Ivan Nesterenko
12	GK	(Ukraine) UKR	Nazar Bayda
16	MF	(Ukraine) UKR	Mykyta Lapko
17	MF	(Ukraine) UKR	Danylo Klopyzhnikov
18	FW	(Ukraine) UKR	Hlyeb Tolok
23	MF	(Ukraine) UKR	Maksym Kovalenko
24	FW	(Ukraine) UKR	Ruslan Tovstonoh
26	MF	(Ukraine) UKR	Stanislav Badetskyi
27	DF	(Ukraine) UKR	Artem Zavhorodniy
28	MF	(Ukraine) UKR	Volodymyr Blyznyuk
30	GK	(Ukraine) UKR	Anatoliy Moskovych

No.	Pos.	Nation	Player
31	MF	(Ukraine) UKR	Vasyl Kurakin
33	DF	(Ukraine) UKR	Abudi Dahlas
35	MF	(Ukraine) UKR	Daniil Kravchuk
36	DF	(Ukraine) UKR	Dmytro Samusyev
40	DF	(Ukraine) UKR	Nikita Ivasyuk
41	FW	(Ukraine) UKR	Mykyta Kuralekh
55	MF	(Ukraine) UKR	Valentyn Kuzmovych
60	MF	(Ukraine) UKR	Tymofiy Khussin
69	DF	(Ukraine) UKR	Maksym Strads
77	MF	(Ukraine) UKR	Heorhiy Kovalskyi
88	MF	(Ukraine) UKR	Mykyta Yudin
91	FW	(Ukraine) UKR	Kostyantyn Omelyanenko

== League and cup history ==
Season	Div.	Pos.	Pl.	W	D	L	GS	GA	P	Domestic Cup	Europe	Notes
1998–99	3rd "C"	8	26	11	6	9	30	33	39	Did not enter		
1999–00	3rd "B"	12	26	6	7	13	26	39	15	1/32 finals Second League Cup		
2000–01	3rd "B"	4	28	12	5	11	51	38	41	1/4 finals Second League Cup		
2001–02	3rd "B"	13	34	11	15	8	39	40	48			
2002–03	3rd "B"	13	30	7	8	15	33	44	29			
2003–04	3rd "C"	3	30	17	5	8	54	31	56			
2004–05	3rd "C"	13	28	6	7	15	27	48	25			
2005–06	3rd "C"	3	24	13	4	7	39	24	43			
2006–07	3rd "B"	12	28	9	3	16	26	40	30			
2007–08	3rd "B"	17	34	6	7	21	33	66	25			
2008–09	3rd "B"	15	34	9	4	21	35	68	31			
2009–10	3rd "B"	14	26	3	1	22	18	66	10			
2010–11	3rd "B"	10	22	5	4	13	18	43	19			
2011–12	3rd "B"	12	26	5	3	18	19	43	18			

== Managers ==
- 2013–2015: Dmytro Kolodyn

== See also ==
- FC Metalurh Zaporizhzhia
