= Yuriy Chumak =

Ukrainian footballer and manager (born 1962)

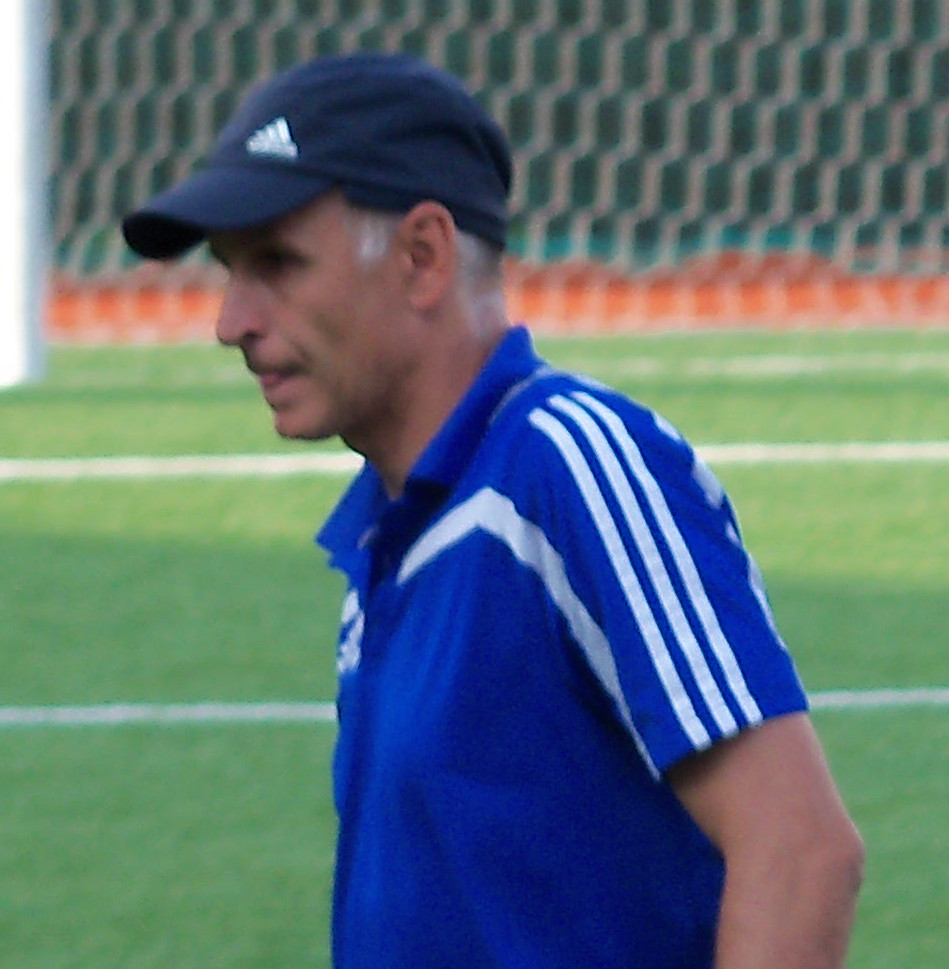
- Chumak in 2011

Personal information
- Full name: Yuriy Oleksandrovych Chumak
- Date of birth: 8 April 1962 (age 64)
- Place of birth: Dnipropetrovsk, Ukrainian SSR, Soviet Union
- Height: 1.80 m (5 ft 11 in)
- Position: Goalkeeper

Team information
- Current team: Kremin Kremenchuk (gk coach)

Youth career
- 1979: Dnipro Dnipropetrovsk
- 1980: Metalurh Dniprodzerzhynsk

Senior career*
Years	Team	Apps	(Gls)
1984–1985	Shakhtar Horlivka	44	(0)
1986–1989	Kryvbas Kryvyi Rih	163	(0)
1990	Prykarpattia Ivano-Frankivsk	30	(0)
1991–1992	Rostselmash	4	(0)
1992	→ Rostselmash-d	1	(0)
1993–1997	Kremin Kremenchuk	87	(0)
1997–1999	Nyva Ternopil	34	(0)
1999–2001	Prykarpattia Ivano-Frankivsk	12	(0)
1999	→ Prykarpattia-2 Ivano-Frankivsk	2	(0)
2001–2004	Hirnyk-Sport Komsomolsk	46	(0)

Managerial career
- 2002–2004: Hirnyk-Sport Komsomolsk
- 2008: Arsenal Kharkiv (gk coach)
- 2008: Kremin Kremenchuk (gk coach)
- 2008–2013: Kremin Kremenchuk
- 2015–2016: Džiugas Telšiai
- 2017: Spartaks Jūrmala (gk coach)
- 2018–2020: Shakhtyor Soligorsk (gk coach)
- 2021–: Tavriya Simferopol (gk coach)
- 2021: Tavriya Simferopol (caretaker)
- * Club domestic league appearances and goals

Yuriy Oleksandrovych Chumak (Ukrainian: Юрій Олександрович Чумак; born 8 April 1962) is a Ukrainian football former goalkeeper and a current Ukrainian Second League club Kremin Kremenchuk goalkeeper coach.

== Coaching career ==
On 21 January 2024, Kremin Kremenchuk signed the former manager Chumak as a goalkeeping coach on a two-year contract. Chumak was a coach for ten matches. In June 2024, Chumak left Kremin to work at newly promoted Ukrainian Premier League club Inhulets Petrove.

== Personal life ==
His son, Roman Chumak, is also a footballer.

== Career statistics ==
As of 30 September 2009

Club	Season	League		Cup		Total	
Club	Season	Apps	Goals	Apps	Goals	Apps	Goals
Kryvbas	1988	48	0	0	0	48	0
Kryvbas	1989	51	0	0	0	51	0
Kryvbas	Total	99	0	0	0	99	0
Prykarpattya	1990	30	0	0	0	30	0
Prykarpattya	Total	30	0	0	0	30	0
Rostselmash	1991	4	0	0	0	4	0
Rostselmash	Total	4	0	0	0	4	0
Rostselmash-d	1992	1	0	0	0	1	0
Rostselmash-d	Total	1	0	0	0	1	0
Kremin	1992–93	1	0	0	0	1	0
Kremin	1993–94	21	0	5	0	26	0
Kremin	1994–95	22	0	0	0	22	0
Kremin	1995–96	25	0	3	0	28	0
Kremin	1996–97	18	0	2	0	20	0
Kremin	Total	87	0	10	0	97	0
Nyva	1997–98	11	0	4	0	15	0
Nyva	1998–99	23	0	0	0	23	0
Nyva	Total	34	0	4	0	38	0
Prykarpattia	1999–00	12	0	1	0	13	0
Prykarpattia	Total	12	0	1	0	13	0
Prykarpattia-2	1999–00	2	0	0	0	2	0
Prykarpattia-2	Total	2	0	0	0	2	0
Hirnyk-Sport	2000–01	24	0	0	0	24	0
Hirnyk-Sport	2001–02	6	0	2	0	5	0
Hirnyk-Sport	2002–03	5	0	0	0	5	0
Hirnyk-Sport	2003–04	0	0	0	0	0	0
Hirnyk-Sport	2004–05	9	0	1	0	10	0
Hirnyk-Sport	Total	44	0	3	0	47	0
Career	Total	313	0	18	0	331	0
