= Aleksandr Sobko =

Russian and Ukrainian footballer

Personal information
- Full name: Aleksandr Ivanovich Sobko
- Date of birth: 31 August 1982 (age 44)
- Height: 1.88 m (6 ft 2 in)
- Position: Forward

Youth career
- FC Metalist Kharkiv

Senior career*
Years	Team	Apps	(Gls)
1999–2000	FC Metalist-2 Kharkiv	1	(0)
2001–2002	FC Oskil Kupiansk	16	(1)
2002–2003	FC Avanhard Rovenky	21	(1)
2003–2004	FC Helios Kharkiv	4	(0)
2004	FC Lokomotyv Kupiansk	6	(0)
2005	FC Helios Kharkiv	8	(3)
2005	FC Bolat	11	(1)
2005–2006	FC Zhytychi Zhytomyr	9	(2)
2006–2008	FC Gornyak Stroitel (amateur)		
2008–2009	FC Rusichi Oryol	26	(3)
2010	FC Znamya Truda Orekhovo-Zuyevo	10	(2)
2011	FC Magnit Zheleznogorsk		
2011–2012	FC Avanhard Kramatorsk	21	(6)
2013	FC Nika-SMK Kharkiv		
2015	FC Sloboda Alekseyevka		
2016	FC Mayak Valky		
2016–2017	FC Viktoriya Mykolaivka	14	(3)
2017	FC Liubotyn		
- * Club domestic league appearances and goals

Aleksandr Ivanovich Sobko or Oleksandr Ivanovych Sobko (Russian: Александр Иванович Собко; Ukrainian: Олександр Іванович Собко; born 31 August 1982) is a former Russian and Ukrainian professional football player.

== Club career ==
He played in the Kazakhstan Premier League for FC Bolat.

== Personal life ==
His younger brother Vitaliy Sobko is also a footballer.
