= Vadym Ishmakov =

Ukrainian footballer

Personal information
- Date of birth: 30 August 1979 (age 47)
- Place of birth: Zaporizhzhia, Ukrainian SSR, Soviet Union
- Height: 1.85 m (6 ft 1 in)
- Position: Defender

Youth career
- Metalurh Zaporizhzhia

Senior career*
Years	Team	Apps	(Gls)
1997–1998	SKA-Lotto Odesa	5	(0)
1998–1999	Dynamo-SKA Odesa	14	(0)
1999	Torpedo Zaporizhzhia	14	(0)
2000	Tavriya Simferopol	0	(0)
2000–2001	Tytan Armyansk	26	(1)
2002–2008	Dinamo Brest	132	(2)
2009	Krymteplytsia Molodizhne	26	(1)
2010	Tytan Armyansk	18	(1)
2011	Tavriya Novotroitske	5	(0)
2011	Krystal Kherson	4	(0)
2013–2014	Motor-Sich Zaporizhzhia	27	(0)
2015	Baranovichi	1	(0)
- * Club domestic league appearances and goals

Vadim Ishmakov (born 30 August 1979) is a retired Ukrainian footballer.

== Career ==
He began his career in 1997 with Dalis, a club competing in the Ukrainian amateur championship. He later played for the SKA-Lotto Odesa and Dynamo-SKA. In 2015 he returned to Belarus to join the First League club FC Baranovichi, playing one league match before leaving the team in August the same year and retiring from football.
