= Maksym Ilyuk =

Ukrainian footballer

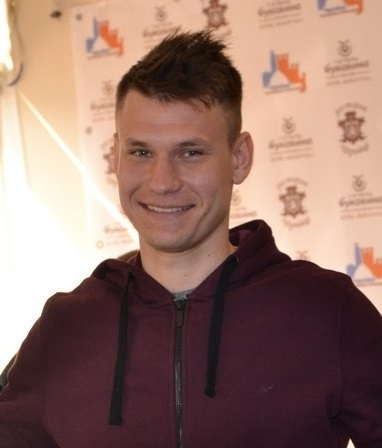

Personal information
- Full name: Maksym Anatoliyovych Ilyuk
- Date of birth: 10 November 1990 (age 36)
- Place of birth: Krasnoilsk, Chernivtsi Oblast, Ukrainian SSR
- Height: 1.87 m (6 ft 1 1/2 in)
- Position: Forward

Team information
- Current team: FSC Bukovyna Chernivtsi
- Number: 25

Youth career
- 2006–2007: FC Bukovyna Chernivtsi

Senior career*
| Years | Team | Apps | (Gls) |
| 2007–2008 | FC Bukovyna Chernivtsi | 46 | (18) |
| 2008–2016 | FC Shakhtar Donetsk | 0 | (0) |
| 2011 | → FC Zorya Luhansk (loan) | 9 | (0) |
| 2013–2014 | → FC Shakhtar-3 Donetsk | 22 | (5) |
| 2015–2016 | → FC Illichivets Mariupol (loan) | 20 | (0) |
| 2017– | FSC Bukovyna Chernivtsi | 2 | (0) |

International career^{‡}
| 2009 | Ukraine U19 | 2 | (0) |
- * Club domestic league appearances and goals as of 30 March 2017 ‡ National team caps and goals as of 30 March 2017

Maksym Ilyuk (Ukrainian: Максим Анатолійович Ілюк, born 10 November 1990) is a Ukrainian footballer who plays as a forward.

== Career ==
Ilyuk's first trainer was V. Buzhak. Maksym was top scorer of FC Bukovyna Chernivtsi during the 2007–08 season in the Ukrainian Second League.
