= Yevhen Arbuzov =

Ukrainian former football forward

Personal information
- Full name: Yevhen Hennadiyovych Arbuzov
- Date of birth: 29 August 1976 (age 50)
- Place of birth: Ukrainian SSR, Soviet Union
- Position: Forward

Senior career*
Years	Team	Apps	(Gls)
1997–1998	Kryvbas-2 Kryvyi Rih	0	(0)
1999–2002	Tytan Armyansk	83	(23)
2002–2003	Dinamo Brest	27	(3)
2004–2009	Tytan Armyansk	158	(70)
2009	Hirnyk Kryvyi Rih	14	(5)
2010	Khimik Krasnoperekopsk		
2012	FC Kazanka		
2014–2016	Hirnyk-Veteran Kryvyi Rih	59	(70)
2017	Hirnyk Kryvyi Rih		

Managerial career
- 2011–: Hirnyk sports school Kryvyi Rih
- * Club domestic league appearances and goals

Yevhen Arbuzov (Ukrainian: Євгеній Геннадійович Арбузов; born 29 August 1976) is a Ukrainian former football forward.
