= FC Illichivets-2 Mariupol =

Illichivets-2 Mariupol
- Full name: FC Illichivets-2 Mariupol
- Founded: 1996
- Dissolved: 2017
- Ground: Zakhidnyi Stadium
- Capacity: 3,206
- League: Ukrainian Second League
- 2016–17: 12th

Illichivets-2 Mariupol is a defunct Ukrainian football team. It was the reserve team of the Ukrainian First League club FC Illichivets Mariupol. The club competed in the Druha Liha football competition of Ukraine.

== History ==
When the Ukrainian Premier League created the Ukrainian Premier Reserve League there was an incentive for clubs to field their reserve clubs in the competition. Illichivets Mariupol still remain to field Illichivets-2 as their third team (juniors). However, after the complete of the 2011-12 Ukrainian Second League the club removed junior team and enter the newly formed Ukrainian Premier League Under-19 competition.
The senior club was relegated from the Premier League in 2015 but still remain committed to the juniors school system. The club entered the team back into the Ukrainian Second League for the 2015–16 Ukrainian Second League season.

== Honours and distinctions ==
- Ukrainian Premier League Reserves
  - Winners: 2013–14

== League and cup history ==
Season	Div.	Pos.	Pl.	W	D	L	GS	GA	P	Domestic Cup	Europe	Notes
2000–01	3rd "C"	13	30	9	7	14	32	47	34	1/16 finals Second League; Cup		as Metalurh-2
2001–02	3rd "C"	14	34	8	10	16	43	59	34			as Metalurh-2
2002–03	3rd "C"	11	28	9	3	16	24	42	30			
2003–04	3rd "C"	9	30	11	9	10	38	40	42			
2004–05	3rd "C"	5	28	13	4	11	49	27	43			
2005–06	3rd "C"	2	24	15	1	8	43	22	46			
2006–07	3rd "B"	4	28	17	3	8	36	35	54			
2007–08	3rd "B"	10	34	12	8	14	43	62	44			
2008–09	3rd "B"	11	34	12	8	14	40	50	44			
2009–10	3rd "B"	12	26	4	3	19	16	40	15			
2010–11	3rd "B"	8	22	9	0	13	20	37	27			
2011–12	3rd "B"	13	26	5	2	19	25	47	17			Withdrew
2012–15	Ukrainian Premier Reserve League and U19s											
2016–17	3rd	12	32	11	1	20	42	56	34			
2017–18	Ukrainian Premier Reserve League and U19s											

== See also ==
- FC Mariupol
