= FC Dnipro-75 Dnipropetrovsk =

- Full name: FC Dnipro-75 Dnipropetrovsk
- Founded: 2007
- Dissolved: 2010
- Ground: Meteor Stadium
- Chairman: Serhiy Doroshenko
- Manager: Nikolai Samoilenko
- League: Druha Liha B
- 2009–2010: 13th (Expelled)
Home colours	Away colours

FC Dnipro-75 Dnipropretrovsk was a Ukrainian professional football club 2000s, which was based on a youth football school in Dnipro.

== History ==
In the late 2000s, as a professional football team based in Dnipropetrovsk, Ukraine, it competed in the Ukrainian Second League, but was expelled from the PFL after not paying the spring 2010 playing dues.

FC Dnipro-75 Dnipropetrovsk was founded in October 2007 after the local construction company "DIK" took over financial support for the famous football school of the same name. The team was based on a local youth sports school (DYuSSh), which had existed since 1975. The first training session of the new football team took place on 24 November 2007 in a sports hall of the Vikhr sports complex. The first training sessions were heading by Mykola Samoylenko and Anatoliy Olenev. The first competition that Dnipro-75 entered was the local Mykola Kudrytskyi Memorial winter football tournament. Already in 2008, the club applied for the professional status and joined four different competitions, Dnipropetrovsk Oblast football championship, Dnipropetrovsk Oblast football cup, Ukrainian football championship for amateurs (KFK), and PFL Second League (Ukrainian football championship for the Second League teams). Dnipro-75 held their 2008 training summer camp in Yalta and it happened so that their first game in the Second League was scheduled with Tytan Armyansk.

Dnipro-75 Dnipropetrovsk entered the professional competition in 2008 and competed in the Ukrainian Second League. They temporarily played in Pavlohrad, while their original stadium was closed. Their first game, in which they were visiting Tytan Armyansk, was lost 0:2 on 20 July 2008. Earlier on 16 July 2008, Dnipro-75 lost their first game of the Ukrainian Cup, when they were visiting Olkom Melitopol. They were eliminated in the first qualification round of the 2008–09 Ukrainian Cup by Olkom 0:2. Their first win came in the next league's match week, when on 25 July 2008 Dnipro-75 were hosting Arsenal Kharkiv. They won it 2:1, and the first goal for Dnipro-75 was scored by Roman Mukhin. They had a very poor start in their first season, earning only 4 points in their first 10 games.

In one of the 2009–10 PFL League Cup home games, Dnipro-75 played in the village of Novooleksandrivka.

== League and cup history ==
Season	Div.	Pos.	Pl.	W	D	L	GS	GA	P	Domestic Cup	Other		Notes
2008	4th "D"	2	8	5	1	2	18	8	16	–			First stage
2008–09	3rd "B"	16	34	8	6	20	28	56	24	1/64 finals			–6
2009–10	3rd "B"	13	26	4	5	17	19	21	14	1/64 finals	LC	Group stage	–3 – Expelled

== See also ==
- FC Dnipro-2 Dnipropetrovsk
