= SC Olkom Melitopol =

Olkom Melitopol
- Full name: Sports Club Olkom Melitopol
- Founded: 1991
- Dissolved: 2011
- Ground: Oleh Oleksenko Spartak Stadium, Melitopol
- Capacity: 2,703
- 2010–11: Ukrainian Second League, 11th

SC Olkom Melitopol was a Ukrainian football club based in Melitopol. The club withdrew from the PFL during the winter break of the 2010–11 season.
The club was founded in 1991. They played in the Second League. The team was originally named Torpedo, but was renamed to its current name in 2000. They played their home games at the Oleh Oleksenko Spartak Stadium in Melitopol. Beside its football team the club also had a boxing section.

== League and cup history ==
=== Torpedo Melitopol (1991–1999) ===
| Season | Div. | Pos. | Pl. | W | D | L | GS | GA | P | Domestic Cup | Europe | Notes |
|---|---|---|---|---|---|---|---|---|---|---|---|---|
| 1992–93 | 4th | 11 | 34 | 12 | 6 | 16 | 39 | 41 | 30 | | | |
| 1993–94 | 4th | 8 | 34 | 12 | 12 | 10 | 35 | 34 | 36 | | | |
| 1994–95 | 4th | 4 | 42 | 24 | 11 | 7 | 51 | 31 | 83 | 1/64 finals | | Promoted |
| 1995–96 | 3rd "B" | 13 | 38 | 12 | 14 | 12 | 44 | 35 | 50 | 1/64 finals | | |
| 1996–97 | 3rd "B" | 10 | 32 | 9 | 14 | 9 | 26 | 32 | 41 | 1/128 finals | | |
| 1997–98 | 3rd "B" | 8 | 32 | 7 | 12 | 13 | 38 | 43 | 33 | 1/64 finals | | |
| 1998–99 | 3rd "B" | 7 | 26 | 10 | 7 | 9 | 27 | 35 | 37 | Did not enter | | |

=== OLKOM Melitopol (2000– ) ===
| Season | Div. | Pos. | Pl. | W | D | L | GS | GA | P | Domestic Cup | Europe | Notes |
|---|---|---|---|---|---|---|---|---|---|---|---|---|
| 1999–00 | 3rd "B" | 8 | 26 | 10 | 4 | 12 | 26 | 30 | 34 | 1/8 finals Second League Cup | | |
| 2000–01 | 3rd "B" | 12 | 28 | 6 | 7 | 15 | 18 | 48 | 25 | 1/32 finals Second League Cup | | |
| 2001–02 | 3rd "B" | 4 | 34 | 19 | 3 | 12 | 56 | 35 | 60 | 1st round | | |
| 2002–03 | 3rd "B" | 4 | 30 | 18 | 5 | 7 | 45 | 27 | 59 | 1/16 finals | | |
| 2003–04 | 3rd "B" | 5 | 30 | 13 | 6 | 11 | 39 | 44 | 45 | 1/32 finals | | |
| 2004–05 | 3rd "B" | 8 | 26 | 9 | 7 | 10 | 27 | 33 | 34 | 1/32 finals | | |
| 2005–06 | 3rd "B" | 14 | 28 | 6 | 7 | 15 | 25 | 39 | 25 | 1/32 finals | | |
| 2006–07 | 3rd "B" | 7 | 28 | 10 | 8 | 10 | 35 | 29 | 38 | 1/16 finals | | |
| 2007–08 | 3rd "B" | 9 | 34 | 14 | 7 | 13 | 38 | 34 | 49 | 1/32 finals | | |
| 2008–09 | 3rd "B" | 7 | 34 | 14 | 8 | 12 | 40 | 43 | 50 | 1/16 finals | | |
| 2009–10 | 3rd "B" | 10 | 26 | 7 | 5 | 14 | 31 | 42 | 26 | 1/64 finals | | |
| 2010–11 | 3rd "B" | 11 | 22 | 5 | 2 | 15 | 21 | 22 | 17 | 1/32 finals | | Withdrew |
