= FC Arsenal-Kyivshchyna Bila Tserkva =

FC Arsenal-Kyivschyna Bila Tserkva
- Full name: FC Arsenal-Kyivschyna Bila Tserkva
- Founded: 2006
- Dissolved: 2018
- Ground: Trudovi Reservy Stadium, Bila Tserkva; Volodymyr Melnyk Stadium, Obukhiv
- Capacity: 13,500
- League: Second League, Group A
- 2017–18: 10th

FC Arsenal-Kyivshchyna Bila Tserkva (Ukrainian: Арсенал-Київщина Біла Церква) was a Ukrainian professional team from Bila Tserkva in Kyiv Oblast. Previous name was FC Arsenal Bila Tserkva until June 2013.

== History ==
The football club was formed in 2006 and entered the Ukrainian Second League in 2007. The football club is part of a bigger sports club "ArsenalBC" based in Bila Tserkva and which specialized in triathlon events and well as cross country running and bicycle racing.

In 2009 FC Arsenal was promoted to the Ukrainian First League via a playoff game. While based in Bila Tserkva, FC Arsenal also plays its games in Obukhiv which is located closer to Kyiv.

The club was relegated to the Ukrainian Second League after the 2012–13 season.

== Stadium and grounds ==
The club's training grounds are located in the village of Shkarivka, Kyiv Oblast around six miles (10 km) away from Bila Tserkva. Its main sponsor is one of the biggest furniture companies in Ukraine, the owner of which is the president of the club, Yuriy Horobets. Until the 2009–2010 season its home games the club were played in the neighboring city of Obukhiv, Kyiv Oblast. Finally the administration of the club managed to lease the locally available municipal stadium, Trudovi Reservy (the Central Children-Youth Sport Arena "Trudovi Reservy"), in Bila Tserkva for the 2009–2010 season. After the club's promotion to the First League, the club was allowed also to use the stadium for some training, although for a limited time.

Trudovi Reservy has an electronic display and some stadium roofing. The stadium is the property of the city and is co-sponsored by the regional football federation, Kyiv Oblast Football Federation along with the city administration. The stadium is primarily designated for the development of the amateur football, in particular the youth teams.

Arsenal bought its own city's sport grounds in 2009 for the construction of its home arena, which is forecasted to have a capacity of 5,000 people. The construction of its playing grounds started in 2009. The club's colours are red and white.

== League and cup history ==
Previous emblem 2006–11

Season	Div.	Pos.	Pl.	W	D	L	GS	GA	P	Domestic Cup	Europe	Notes
2007	4th	4	8	2	3	3	8	6	9			Admitted to Druha Liha
2007–08	3rd "A"	7	30	13	7	10	28	31	46	1/64 finals		
2008–09	3rd "A"	2	32	21	4	7	51	30	67	1/32 finals		Promoted (Note: Won playoff game 1–0 against FC Poltava to determine promotion due to FC Ihroservice Simferopol withdrawing from the PFL)
2009–10	2nd	9	34	12	10	12	48	44	46	1/32 finals		
2010–11	2nd	9	34	15	6	13	42	43	51	1/16 finals		
2011–12	2nd	4	34	18	8	8	51	39	62	1/16 finals		
2012–13	2nd	18	34	5	5	24	23	76	20	1/32 finals		Relegated
2013–14	3rd	15	36	9	7	20	27	57	34	1/32 finals		
2014–15	3rd	9	27	6	2	19	14	40	20	1/32 finals		
2015–16	3rd	13	26	5	2	19	24	56	17	1/32 finals		
2016–17	3rd	15	32	7	4	21	29	82	25	1/64 finals		
2017–18	3rd	10	27	4	1	22	18	62	13	1/64 finals		Relegated (Note: moving to Obukhiv)

== Coaches ==
- 2009–2012 Ihor Artymovych
- 2012–2013 Oleh Lutkov
- 2013–2013 Yevhen Feshchenko
- 2013–2015 Vadym Mandrievskyi
- 2015 Vitaliy Rozhon
- 2016 Mykola Lytvyn (caretaker)
- 2016–2017 Andriy Ushchapovskyi
- 2017–2018 Oleksandr Akimov

== See also ==
- FC Ros' Bila Tserkva
