= 2005–06 Ukrainian Second League =

Ukrainian Second League
- Season: 2005–06
- Champions: FC Desna Chernihiv; MFK Mykolaiv; FC Dnipro Cherkasy
- Promoted: PFC Oleksandria
- Relegated: 9 teams withdrew
- Top goalscorer: 21 – Oleksandr Kozhemyachenko (Desna Chernihiv)
- Biggest home win: 12–0 Desna–Boyarka-2006
- Biggest away win: 0–5 - MFK Zhytomyr–Desna; Boyarka-2006–Nyva; Zirka–PFC Oleksandria; Khimik–MFK Mykolaiv
- Highest scoring: 12–0 Desna–Boyarka-2006
- Highest attendance: 7,800 – Desna–Dynamo-3

The 2005–06 Ukrainian Second League was the 15th season of 3rd level professional football in Ukraine. The competitions were divided into three regional groups – A, B, C. This season was known for a high volume of withdrawals from the competition.

== Team changes ==
=== Newly admitted ===
The following team was promoted from the 2005 Ukrainian Football Amateur League:

- FC Yalos Yalta – (debut)

The 2004 Ukrainian Football Amateur League participant:

- FC Kremin Kremenchuk – (returning after an absence of 4 seasons)
- FC Sokil Berezhany – (returning after an absence of 13 seasons)
- FC Khimik Krasnoperekopsk – (debut)
- FC Yednist' Plysky – (debut)

The following teams were due to special circumstances:

- MFC Zhytomyr – (debut)
- FC Zhytychi Zhytomyr – (debut)
  - OFC Zhytychi Zhytomyr is regarded a successor of FC Polissya Zhytomyr as the main regional club where o stands for oblast (region).
- FC Arsenal Kharkiv – (returning after an absence of 3 seasons)
  - There was created FC Kharkiv that was admitted to the 2005–06 Ukrainian Premier League in place of Arsenal, while the latter restarted from the Second League.

Three more teams were also admitted:

- FC Kryvbas-2 Kryvyi Rih – (returning after an absence of 1 seasons)
- FC Kharkiv-2 – (debut)
- FC Knyazha Shchaslyve – (debut)

=== Relegated from the First League ===
- FC Polissya Zhytomyr dissolved during the interseason period

=== Renamed / Replaced ===
- FC Osvita Borodianka before the season moved to Kyiv becoming FC Osvita Kyiv. That team lasted until the end of 2005 and in 2006 it was replaced with FC Boyarka 2006.
- Before the season FC Enerhiya Yuzhnoukrainsk was known as FC Olimpiya AES (Atomic Electric Station) Yuzhnoukrainsk.

=== Location map ===
Locations of team home grounds in Ukrainian Second League 2004–05

== Group A ==
Pos	Team	Pld	W	D	L	GF	GA	GD	Pts	Promotion or relegation
1	FC Desna Chernihiv (C, P)	28	24	2	2	76	13	+63	74	Promoted to First League
2	FC Fakel Ivano-Frankivsk	28	19	5	4	56	24	+32	62	
3	FC Rava Rava-Ruska	28	18	4	6	37	13	+24	58	Withdrew (Note: FC Rava Rava-Ruska completed the season and failed to submit a license for the next season.)
4	FC Nyva Ternopil	28	14	8	6	34	18	+16	50	
5	FC Karpaty-2 Lviv	28	14	4	10	39	36	+3	46	
6	FC Bukovyna Chernivtsi	28	13	5	10	38	33	+5	44	
7	FC Veres Rivne	28	12	6	10	33	40	−7	42	
8	FC Zhytychi Zhytomyr	28	10	11	7	38	34	+4	41	Withdrew (Note: FC Zhytychi Zhytomyr entered the competition after the breakup of FC Polissya Zhytomyr which competed in the Ukrainian First League from the prior season. After completing the season they failed to submit a license for the next season.)
9	FC Obolon-2 Kyiv	28	9	8	11	31	36	−5	35	
10	FC Chornohora Ivano-Frankivsk	28	7	8	13	25	32	−7	29	Withdrew (Note: FC Chornohora Ivano-Frankivsk completed the season, submitted a license for the next season but failed to pay the fee and thus were removed from the PFL.)
11	FC Dynamo-3 Kyiv	28	7	8	13	17	28	−11	29	
12	FC Knyazha Schaslyve	28	6	11	11	32	35	−3	29	
13	FC Naftovyk Dolyna	28	8	3	17	22	45	−23	27	
14	MFC Zhytomyr	28	3	2	23	16	38	−22	11	Withdrew (Note: MFC Zhytomyr entered the competition after the breakup of FC Polissya Zhytomyr from the prior season. They withdrew after the 21st round when after the Zhytomyr city elections in March 2006, the city decided not to continue funding the club the team was dissolved. (April 30, 2006). Their games were considered technical losses for the rest of the season.)
15	FC Boyarka-2006 Boyarka	28	2	3	23	13	82	−69	9	Renamed (Note: During the season FC Osvita Kyiv became financially insolvent and withdrew. Administration moved to Boyarka where they changed the team name to FC Boyarka-2006. This was ratified by the UFF. (March 23rd, 2006))
-	FC Sokil Berezhany	0	-	-	-	-	-	—	0	Removed from the competition (Note: FC Sokil Berezhany were admitted into the PFL and after two games withdrew. Their record was one draw and one loss, scoring one goal and having 8 scored against. They were removed from the competition.)

(C) Champions; (P) Promoted

=== Top goalscorers ===
Scorer	Goals (Pen.)	Team
(Ukraine) Oleksandr Kozhemyachenko	21 (2)	FC Desna Chernihiv
(Ukraine) Oleksandr Mykulyak	18 (6)	FC Fakel Ivano-Frankivsk
(Ukraine) Oleksandr Semenyuk	17 (2)	FC Bukovyna Chernivtsi
(Ukraine) Valentyn Krukovets	14 (2)	FC Desna Chernihiv
(Ukraine) Dmytro Kolodyn	12	FC Desna Chernihiv

== Group B ==
Pos	Team	Pld	W	D	L	GF	GA	GD	Pts	Promotion or relegation
1	MFK Mykolaiv (C, P)	28	22	3	3	56	11	+45	69	Promoted to First League
2	PFC Oleksandria (P)	28	20	5	3	52	14	+38	65	Promoted to First League (Note: PFC Oleksandria were promoted to the Ukrainian First League for the 2006–07 season as the best 2nd placed team in amongst the three Second League teams within the Groups.)
3	FC Sevastopol	28	15	6	7	48	29	+19	51	
4	FC Yalos Yalta	28	12	7	9	28	27	+1	43	Withdrew (Note: FC Yalos Yalta completed the season and failed to submit a license for the next season.)
5	FC Kryvbas-2 Kryvyi Rih	28	11	6	11	45	43	+2	39	Withdrew (Note: FC Kryvbas-2 Kryvyi Rih completed the season but the main club Kryvbas Kryvyi Rih was in financial difficulty and consolidated their reserve and junior club to play in the reserves competition in the next season.)
6	FC Yednist' Plysky	28	10	8	10	38	36	+2	38	
7	FC Dnister Ovidiopol	28	10	8	10	28	27	+1	38	
8	FC Khimik Krasnoperekopsk	28	11	5	12	24	30	−6	38	
9	FC Zirka Kirovohrad	28	11	4	13	23	36	−13	37	Withdrew (Note: FC Zirka Kirovohrad completed the season and failed to submit a license for the next season due to financial insolvency.)
10	FC Tytan Armyansk	28	8	9	11	33	39	−6	33	
11	FC Hirnik Kryvyi Rih	28	7	11	10	23	34	−11	32	
12	Enerhiya Pivdenoukrainsk	28	6	8	14	29	45	−16	26	
13	FC Krystal Kherson	28	7	4	17	29	51	−22	25	Withdrew (Note: FC Krystal Kherson completed the season and failed to submit a license for the next season due to financial insolvency.)
14	FC Olkom Melitopol	28	6	7	15	25	39	−14	25	
15	FC Ros Bila Tserkva	28	5	7	16	26	45	−19	22	

(C) Champions; (P) Promoted

=== Top goalscorers ===
Scorer	Goals	Team
(Ukraine) Oleksandr Hrebinyuk	16	PFC Oleksandria
(Ukraine) Yevhen Arbuzov	15 (3)	FC Tytan Armyansk
(Ukraine) Andriy Shevchuk	13	PFC Sevastopol
(Ukraine) Oleksiy Oleshko	11 (6)	FC Yednist' Plysky
(Ukraine) Dmytro Zayko	10	MFK Mykolaiv

== Group C ==
=== Standings ===
Pos	Team	Pld	W	D	L	GF	GA	GD	Pts	Promotion or relegation
1	FC Dnipro Cherkasy (C, P)	24	18	3	3	49	22	+27	57	Promoted to First League
2	FC Illichivets-2 Mariupol	24	15	1	8	43	22	+21	46	
3	FC Metalurh-2 Zaporizhzhia	24	13	4	7	39	24	+15	43	
4	FC Nafkom Brovary	24	12	6	6	28	18	+10	42	
5	FC Olimpik Donetsk	24	13	2	9	42	28	+14	41	
6	FC Yavir Krasnopilya	24	11	5	8	25	26	−1	38	
7	FC Hazovyk-KhGV Kharkiv	24	10	7	7	41	34	+7	37	
8	FC Hirnyk-Sport Komsomolsk	24	10	4	10	30	31	−1	34	
9	FC Kremin Kremenchuk	24	9	6	9	22	34	−12	33	
10	FC Arsenal Kharkiv	24	9	3	12	35	44	−9	30	(Note: FC Arsenal Kharkiv entered a new team with new management.)
11	FC Shakhtar-3 Donetsk	24	8	2	14	32	38	−6	26	
12	MFC Oleksandria	24	4	2	18	20	37	−17	14	Withdrew (Note: MFC Oleksandria withdrew from the competition after Round 23 when after the city elections of Oleksandria the city administration was unable to budget funds for the team and terminated financial support. (June 7th, 2006) All games after this date were considered Technical losses.)
13	FC Kharkiv-2	24	0	3	21	12	60	−48	3	Withdrew (Note: FC Kharkiv-2 completed the season. The main club FC Kharkiv consolidated their reserve and junior club to play in the reserves competition in the next season.)

(C) Champions; (P) Promoted

=== Top goalscorers ===
Scorer	Goals (Pen.)	Team
(Ukraine) Serhiy Kolesnyk	17 (4)	FC Illichivets-2 Mariupol
(Ukraine) Serhiy Artyukh	13 (2)	FC Olimpik Donetsk
(Ukraine) Roman Polishchuk	12 (2)	FC Dnipro Cherkasy
(Ukraine) Viktor Raskov	11 (2)	FC Arsenal Kharkiv
(Ukraine) Roman Pakholyuk	11 (7)	FC Dnipro Cherkasy

== See also ==
- 2005–06 Ukrainian Premier League
- 2005–06 Ukrainian First League
- 2005–06 Ukrainian Cup
