= 2007–08 Ukrainian Second League =

Ukrainian Second League
- Season: 2007–08
- Champions: FC Knyazha Schaslyve; FC Komunalnyk Luhansk
- Runner up: FC Nyva Ternopil; FC Titan Armyansk
- Relegated: 5 withdrew
- Top goalscorer: (20) - Andriy Budnyi (Obolon-2 Kyiv), Viktor Arefyev (Olimpik Donetsk), Yevhen Arbuzov (Titan Armyansk)

The 2007–08 Ukrainian Second League was the 17th season of 3rd level professional football in Ukraine. The competitions were divided into two groups – A and B.

== Team changes ==
=== Newly admitted ===
The following teams were promoted from the 2007 Ukrainian Football Amateur League:

- FC Podillya-Khmelnytskyi – (returning after an absence of four seasons)
- FC Arsenal Bila Tserkva – (debut)
- FC Olimpik Kirovohrad – (debut)

More teams were admitted that participated in the 2006 Ukrainian Football Amateur League:

- FC Shakhtar Sverdlovsk – (returning after an absence of 12 seasons)
- FC Nyva-Svitanok Vinnytsia – (returning after a season of absence, previously as FC Nyva Vinnytsia)

Also, four more clubs were admitted to professional competitions without playing in amateur league

- FC Korosten – (debut)
- FC Komunalnyk Luhansk – (debut)
- FC Poltava – (debut)
- FC Tytan Donetsk – (debut)

=== Relegated from the First League ===
- none (FC Krasyliv and FC Spartak Ivano-Frankivsk withdrew right before the start)

=== Location map ===
Locations of team home grounds in Ukrainian Second League 2007–08

== Group A ==
Pos	Team	Pld	W	D	L	GF	GA	GD	Pts	Promotion or relegation
1	FC Knyazha Schaslyve (C, P)	30	24	5	1	70	13	+57	77	Promoted to First League
2	FC Nyva Ternopil	30	18	10	2	52	15	+37	64	
3	FC Podillya-Khmelnytskyi	30	17	7	6	47	28	+19	58	(Note: FC Podillya-Khmelnytskyi, FC Nyva-Svitanok Vinnytsia, FC Korosten and FC Arsenal Bila Tserkva enter the competition.)
4	FC Bukovyna Chernivtsi	30	17	6	7	43	25	+18	57	
5	FC Obolon-2 Kyiv	30	15	6	9	50	36	+14	51	
6	FC Yednist' Plysky	30	14	6	10	34	32	+2	48	
7	FC Arsenal Bila Tserkva	30	13	7	10	28	31	−3	46	
8	FC Korosten Korosten	30	11	11	8	26	22	+4	44	
9	FC Nyva-Svitanok Vinnytsia	30	10	5	15	23	40	−17	35	
10	FC Dynamo-3 Kyiv	30	9	5	16	30	43	−13	32	Withdrew (Note: FC Dynamo-3 Kyiv withdrew out of courtesy before the start of the next season to allow MFK Mykolaiv to enter the competition.)
11	FC Ros' Bila Tserkva	30	8	6	16	28	49	−21	30	
12	FC Enerhiya Yuzhnoukrainsk	30	7	9	14	22	47	−25	30	Withdrew (Note: FC Enerhiya Yuzhnoukrainsk withdrew from the PFL at the end of the season citing financial difficulties. However, the team indicated that they will return to the PFL in the 2009-10 season. They did not hold to their promise.)
13	FC Nafkom Brovary	30	7	8	15	33	46	−13	29	
14	FC Veres Rivne	30	7	8	15	25	44	−19	29	
15	FC Karpaty-2 Lviv	30	7	3	20	33	53	−20	24	
16	FC Naftovyk Dolyna	30	4	2	24	13	33	−20	14	Withdrew (Note: FC Naftovyk Dolyna withdrew after the first half of the season. Technical victories were awarded to their opponents in the second half of the season.)

(C) Champions; (P) Promoted

=== Top goalscorers ===
Scorer	Goals	Team
(Ukraine) Andriy Budnyi	20 (2)	FC Obolon-2 Kyiv
(Ukraine) Oleksandr Mandzyuk	15 (2)	FC Kniazha Schaslyve
(Ukraine) Maksym Ilyuk	11	FC Bukovyna Chernivtsi
(Ukraine) Serhiy Makoviychuk	11	FC Bukovyna Chernivtsi
(Ukraine) Oleksandr Kurnevych	11	FC Kniazha Schaslyve

== Group B ==
Pos	Team	Pld	W	D	L	GF	GA	GD	Pts	Promotion or relegation
1	Komunalnyk Luhansk (C, P)	34	22	7	5	56	26	+30	73	Promoted to First League
2	Tytan Armyansk	34	22	5	7	74	39	+35	71	
3	Arsenal Kharkiv	34	21	8	5	62	20	+42	71	
4	Khimik Krasnoperekopsk	34	21	6	7	54	28	+26	69	Withdrew (Note: FC Khimik Krasnoperekopsk did not submit a license for the next season and withdrew from the PFL.)
5	Shakhtar Sverdlovsk	34	20	6	8	46	27	+19	66	(Note: FC Olimpik Kirovohrad, FC Poltava, FC Shakhtar Sverdlovsk, FC Komunalnyk Luhansk and FC Titan Donetsk enter the competition.)
6	Olimpik Donetsk	34	19	6	9	66	41	+25	63	
7	Shakhtar-3 Donetsk	34	15	8	11	57	50	+7	53	
8	Kremin Kremenchuk	34	14	8	12	49	46	+3	50	
9	Olkom Melitopol	34	14	7	13	38	34	+4	49	
10	Illichivets-2 Mariupol	34	12	8	14	43	62	−19	44	
11	FC Poltava	34	11	10	13	36	51	−15	43	
12	Tytan Donetsk	34	11	7	16	44	52	−8	40	
13	Yavir Krasnopillya	34	10	7	17	36	62	−26	37	
14	Hirnyk Kryvyi Rih	34	9	10	15	43	51	−8	37	
15	Hirnyk-Sport Komsomolsk	34	9	7	18	38	59	−21	34	
16	Olimpik Kirovohrad	34	7	4	23	34	68	−34	25	
17	Metalurh-2 Zaporizhzhia	34	6	7	21	33	66	−33	25	
18	Hazovyk-KhGV Kharkiv	34	1	3	30	14	41	−27	6	Withdrew (Note: FC Hazovyk-KhGV Kharkiv withdrew after the first half of the season. Technical victories were awarded to their opponents in the second half of the season.)

Source: Professional Football League of Ukraine, Second League Group B
Rules for classification: 1) points; 2) goal difference; 3) number of goals scored.
(C) Champions; (P) Promoted

=== Top goalscorers ===
Scorer	Goals	Team
(Ukraine) Viktor Arefyev	20 (3)	Olimpik Donetsk
(Ukraine) Yevhen Arbuzov	20 (4)	Tytan Armyansk
(Ukraine) Yuriy Kudinov	20 (7)	Komunalnyk Luhansk
(Ukraine) Roman Dovzhyk	19 (4)	Tytan A / Khimik K
(Ukraine) Roman Loktionov	18 (1)	Kremin Kremenchuk

=== Results ===
Matches with Hazovyk shown in gray count as a win for the opposing team.

Home \ Away	ARK	HAZ	HIR	HIS	IL2	KHI	KOM	KRE	ME2	OLD	OLK	OLM	POL	SH3	SHS	TYA	TID	SUM
Arsenal Kharkiv		3–0	0–0	3–0	4–1	2–1	2–0	1–1	1–2	1–0	3–1	0–1	1–1	4–0	3–0	3–0	2–1	5–1
Hazovyk	0–2		1–2	1–3	3–0					2–2	0–2	0–1			0–2		0–0	1–3
Hirnyk Kryvyi Rih	0–1			3–0	3–0	0–1	1–2	1–2	3–2	0–2	6–0	0–2	1–1	3–3	2–2	0–1	2–2	0–0
Hirnyk-Sport Komsomolsk	1–1		2–1		4–0	0–2	2–2	0–2	1–1	2–0	1–2	0–2	0–0	0–1	0–1	1–1	1–3	2–0
Illichivets-2 Mariupol	0–0		2–3	4–3		1–3	0–5	2–2	3–1	2–1	1–0	2–2	2–3	1–1	0–0	2–3	3–2	2–1
Khimik	2–1	3–0	1–1	3–0	1–1		0–0	0–1	4–0	1–2	2–0	1–0	3–1	2–0	1–1	2–2	1–0	1–0
Komunalnyk Luhansk	1–1	1–0	1–1	4–0	3–1	1–0		2–1	1–0	1–1	4–1	1–0	1–0	1–2	1–0	1–0	2–0	4–0
Kremin Kremenchuk	0–0	3–1	2–1	1–2	1–0	1–4	1–0		3–1	0–1	2–0	1–1	4–1	1–3	0–0	2–2	0–1	2–3
Metalurh-2 Zaporizhzhia	0–3	4–0	3–1	4–1	1–4	0–1	1–2	0–4		1–3	0–0	0–2	0–1	0–2	1–2	2–1	0–1	1–2
Olimpik Donetsk	2–0		5–1	5–1	3–1	0–1	1–3	2–0	3–2		3–1	1–0	6–0	3–2	1–1	3–4	3–0	3–0
Olimpik Kirovohrad	0–2		2–2	2–2	0–1	2–3	0–1	2–4	3–1	1–1		0–1	1–2	1–2	1–0	1–2	2–2	2–2
Olkom Melitopol	1–1		1–2	1–0	1–0	0–1	0–0	1–1	0–1	2–3	1–0		2–0	4–1	1–2	1–4	1–0	3–0
FC Poltava	0–4	1–0	0–0	0–4	1–1	3–1	1–0	0–0	3–3	4–1	4–2	1–1		1–2	1–0	1–2	2–2	3–2
Shakhtar-3 Donetsk	0–3	2–2	4–1	1–1	0–1	2–3	2–1	4–1	4–1	1–2	0–0	4–2	1–1		0–1	3–0	2–2	2–2
Shakhtar Sverdlovsk	2–0		1–0	1–0	2–3	1–1	3–0	3–2	4–1	1–0	3–0	2–1	1–0	2–1		2–1	2–0	4–2
Tytan Armyansk	0–1	3–2	4–1	4–0	4–0	2–1	2–2	4–0	4–0	2–0	4–0	3–1	2–0	0–2	1–0		3–2	4–0
Titan Donetsk	1–2	4–1	2–0	3–2	1–2	3–1	1–3	1–4	1–0	1–1	3–1	1–1	0–0	1–2	1–0	1–3		2–1
PFC Sumy	0–2		0–2	0–2	0–0	0–2	2–4	2–0	0–0	2–2	1–3	1–0	1–0	2–1	1–0	2–2	3–1	

Updated to match(es) played on June 30, 2008. Source: Second League Group B
Legend: Blue = home team win; Yellow = draw; Red = away team win.

== Stadia ==
Rank	Stadium	Capacity	Club
1	CMS Vinnytsia	25,000	FC Nyva Vinnytsia
2	Army Stadium Lviv (SKA)	23,040	FC Karpaty-2 Lviv
3	Stadion Avanhard	20,000	FC Veres Rivne
4	CMS Termopil	18,500	FC Nyva Ternopil
5	Stadion Bukovyna	17,000	FC Bukovyna Chernivtsi
6	Politechnik	11,400	FC Kremin Kremenchuk
7	Stadion Khimik	5,000	FC Titan Armyansk
8	Stadion Lokomotyv	5,000	FC Poltava
9	Dynamo's auxiliary field Koncha Zaspa	3,000	FC Dynamo-3 Kyiv
10	Stadion Kolos	3,000	FC Yavir Krasnopilya
11	OOM Stadion Spartak	?	FC Olkom Melitopol

Notes:

- CMS stands for Central Municipal Stadium, the name of each stadium that doesn't carry any official names, and is followed by the city's name where the stadium is located. Usually such stadiums are the property of the city with a generic name "Tsentralnyi" (Central, in Ukrainian).
- OOM stands for Oleh Oleksenko Memorial

== See also ==
- 2007–08 Ukrainian First League
