= 2008–09 Ukrainian Second League =

Ukrainian Second League
- Season: 2008–09
- Champions: Nyva Ternopil; Zirka Kirovohrad
- Runner up: Arsenal Bila Tserkva(Playoff winner); FC Poltava(Playoff participant)
- Relegated: 6 withdrew, 2 expelled
- Top goalscorer: 22 - Ihor Bezdolny (Tytan Armyansk)

The 2008–09 Ukrainian Second League was the 18th season of 3rd level professional football in Ukraine. The competitions were divided into two groups – A and B.

== Competition information ==
Note: Relegation from the League is not covered by the current regulations. The placing of teams in the table is done in the following order:

- number of accumulated points
- number of wins
- difference(GD) between goals for(GF) and goals allowed(GA)
- number of goals for
- The League Fair-play ranking

The next tie-break is a simple draw.

== Team changes ==
=== Admitted teams ===
The following teams were promoted from the 2008 Ukrainian Football Amateur League:

- FC Bastion Illichivsk – first group stage participant (debut)
- FC Desna-2 Chernihiv – first group stage participant (debut)
- FC Dnipro-75 Dnipropetrovsk – first group stage participant (debut)

Also, two more reserve teams were admitted:

- FC Knyazha-2 Schaslyve – (debut)
- PFC Sevastopol-2 – (debut)

Also, one team was re-admitted:

- MFC Mykolaiv, which placed 10th in the 2007–08 Ukrainian First League and withdrew after the season, was admitted to the Second League at the expense of FC Dynamo-3 Kyiv. Mykolaiv returned to the Second League after an absence of two seasons.

=== Relegated teams ===
The following teams were relegated from the 2007–08 Ukrainian First League:

- FC Dnipro Cherkasy – 18th place (returning after an absence of two seasons)
- FC CSKA Kyiv – 19th place (returning after an absence of 12 seasons)
- FC Stal Dniprodzerzhynsk – 20th place (returning after an absence of four seasons)

=== Renamed teams ===
- A teams swap de facto took place when FC Olimpik Kirovohrad was renamed into FC Zirka Kirovohrad and reorganized. Previously in 2007 both Olimpik and Zirka played in the Amateur League. Following reorganization Olimpik continued its participation at amateur level, while Zirka started to play at professional level.
- Nyva-Svitanok Vinnytsia renamed themselves prior to the start of the season to Nyva Vinnytsia.
- FC Podillya-Khmelnytskyi Khmelnytskyi renamed themselves to Dynamo Khmelnytskyi on March 2, 2009 (during the season).
- FC Yavir Krasnopillya changed their name to FC Sumy on September 11, 2008 (during the season).

=== Withdrawn (expelled) teams ===
- FC Dynamo-3 Kyiv withdrew out of courtesy before the start of the season to allow MFK Mykolaiv to enter the competition.
- FC Khimik Krasnoperekopsk did not submit a license for the season and withdrew from the PFL.
- FC Enerhiya Yuzhnoukrainsk withdrew from the PFL before the start of the season citing financial difficulties.
- FC Desna-2 Chernihiv did not arrive On October 25, 2008, for the match against their opponent FC Knjazha-2 Schaslyve and subsequently withdrew from the PFL on October 29, 2008.
- FC Obolon-2 Kyiv withdrew after the winter-break.
- FC Knyazha-2 Shchaslyve withdrew after the winter-break.
- PFC Sevastopol-2 withdrew after the winter-break.
- FC Korosten was expelled from the PFL after the 22nd round for not arriving to a scheduled game for the second time in the 2008–09 season.
- FC Dnipro Cherkasy was expelled from the competition after the 28th round.

=== Location map ===
Locations of team home grounds in Ukrainian Second League 2008–09

== Competitions ==
=== Group A ===
Pos	Team	Pld	W	D	L	GF	GA	GD	Pts	Promotion or relegation
1	FC Nyva Ternopil (C, P)	32	21	8	3	50	26	+24	71	Promoted to First League
2	FC Arsenal Bila Tserkva (P)	32	21	4	7	51	31	+20	67	Playoff game winner Promoted to First League
3	PFC Nyva Vinnytsia	32	18	7	7	42	30	+12	61	Name change (Note: Nyva Vinnytsia renamed themselves from Nyva-Svitanok prior to the start of the season)
4	FC CSCA Kyiv	32	18	3	11	40	23	+17	57	
5	FC Nafkom Brovary	32	16	4	12	45	33	+12	52	Withdrew
6	FC Bastion Illichivsk	32	16	4	12	36	40	−4	52	
7	FC Dnipro Cherkasy	32	17	5	10	37	20	+17	50 (Note: FC Dnipro Cherkasy deducted 6 points by the Ukrainian Football Federation. Three points on November 2, 2008 and three points on March 26, 2009. The club failed to arrive for their 29th and 30th Round games and subsequently were expelled from the competition by the PFL.)	Expelled
8	FC Dynamo Khmelnytskyi	32	14	5	13	32	38	−6	47	Name change (Note: FC Podillya-Khmelnytskyi renamed themselves to Dynamo Khmelnytskyi on March 2, 2009.)
9	FC Bukovyna Chernivtsi	32	14	2	16	29	39	−10	44	
10	FC Ros Bila Tserkva	32	12	8	12	38	38	0	44	
11	MFK Mykolaiv	32	11	10	11	28	27	+1	43	(Note: MFK Mykolaiv were readmitted into the PFL after dissolving at the end of the Persha Liha 2007–08 season at the expense of FC Dynamo-3 Kyiv who withdrew from the competition)
12	FC Yednist' Plysky	32	12	4	16	31	41	−10	40	
13	FC Veres Rivne	32	11	6	15	24	32	−8	39	
14	FC Karpaty-2 Lviv	32	9	7	16	28	45	−17	34	
15	FC Korosten	32	8	2	22	24	42	−18	23 (Note: FC Korosten deducted 3 points by the Ukrainian Football Federation on March 26, 2009. After not arriving for their 22nd-round game against Veres Rivne, the PFL expelled FC Korosten from the professional leagues.)	Expelled
16	FC Obolon-2 Kyiv	32	5	4	23	20	30	−10	19	Withdrew
17	FC Knjazha-2 Schaslyve	32	4	2	26	15	35	−20	14	Withdrew

(C) Champions; (P) Promoted

==== Withdrawn teams ====
===== Desna-2 Chernihiv =====
On October 25, 2008 FC Desna-2 Chernihiv did not arrive for the match against their opponent FC Knjazha-2 Schaslyve and subsequently withdrew from the PFL on October 29, 2008. The PFL annulled all their results from the competition and adjusted the standings. Desna-2 Chernihiv had a record of 2 wins, 1 draw and 12 losses scoring 7 goals and having 24 goals scored against them.

===== Obolon-2 Kyiv =====
Obolon-2 withdrew after the winter-break. Obolon-2 Kyiv after 20 games had a record of 5 wins, 4 draws and 11 losses scoring 20 goals and having 31 goals scored against them and were in 16th place in the standings.

===== Knyazha-2 Schaslyve =====
Knyazha-2 withdrew after the winter-break. FC Knjazha-2 Schaslyve after 20 games had a record of 4 wins, 2 draws and 14 losses scoring 15 goals and having 35 goals scored against them and were in 17th place in the standings.

===== Nafkom Brovary =====
Nafkom withdrew after the season completed failing to receive a professional license. Most of its players joined Nyva Vinnytsia.

==== Expelled teams ====
===== FC Korosten =====
FC Korosten was expelled from the PFL after the 22nd round for not arriving to a scheduled game for the second time in the 2008–09 season. FC Korosten after 21 games had a record of 8 wins, 2 draws and 11 losses scoring 24 goals and having 36 goals scored against them and were in 11th place in the standings.

===== Dnipro Cherkasy =====
Dnipro were expelled from the competition after the 28th round. The club failed to arrive for their 29th and 30th-round games. Dnipro Cherkasy after 27 games had a record of 17 wins, 5 draws and 5 losses scoring 37 goals and having 14 scored against them and were in 3rd place in the standings.

=== Top goalscorers ===
Scorer	Goals (Pen.)	Team
(Ukraine) Pavlo Malyi	13	Nyva Ternopil
(Ukraine) Kostiantyn Derevliov	13 (7)	Arsenal Bila Tserkva
(Ukraine) Roman Pitsur	12	Arsenal Bila Tserkva
(Ukraine) Serhiy Kushka	10 (3)	Nafkom Brovary
(Ukraine) Maksym Ilyuk	7	Bukovyna Chernivtsi ^{6}
(Ukraine) Dmytro Kozban	7	Knjazha-2 Schaslyve/Nafkom Brovary ^{7}
(Ukraine) Mykola Tararov	7	Bastion Illichivsk
(Ukraine) Vasyl Tovkatskyi	7	Nyva Ternopil/Arsenal Bila Tserkva ^{8}
(Ukraine) Andriy Veretynskyi	7 (3)	Nyva Vinnytsia
(Ukraine) Oleksiy Kolesnykov	7 (3)	Dynamo Khmelnytskyi

- ^6 Ilyuk signed with Premier League club Shakhtar Donetsk (December 12, 2008)
- ^7 Kozban signed with Nafkom after Knjazha-2 withdrew from the competition and he was granted free agent status from the PFL
- ^8 Tovkatsky signed with Arsenal Bila Tserkva after the winter break

=== Group B ===
Pos	Team	Pld	W	D	L	GF	GA	GD	Pts	Promotion or relegation
1	Zirka Kirovohrad (C, P)	34	23	3	8	58	26	+32	72	Promoted to First League – Name Change (Note: Prior to the start of the season FC Olimpik Kirovohrad changed back its name to Zirka, and Zirka that participated in amateur competitions became Olimpik.)
2	FC Poltava	34	21	9	4	52	23	+29	72	Playoff game
3	Stal Dniprodzerzhynsk	34	21	7	6	62	29	+33	70	
4	Tytan Armyansk	34	19	7	8	55	31	+24	64	
5	Shakhtar-3 Donetsk	34	17	7	10	66	44	+22	58	
6	Olimpik Donetsk	34	16	9	9	55	32	+23	57	
7	Olkom Melitopol	34	14	8	12	40	43	−3	50	
8	Shakhtar Sverdlovsk	34	12	13	9	31	22	+9	46 (Note: FC Tytan Donetsk, FC Shakhtar Sverdlovsk, and FC Hirnyk Kryvyi Rih deducted three points on June 18, 2009.)	
9	Tytan Donetsk	34	12	11	11	37	33	+4	44	Withdrew
10	Illichivets-2 Mariupol	34	12	8	14	40	50	−10	44	
11	Hirnyk Kryvyi Rih	34	15	5	14	46	56	−10	41 (Note: FC Arsenal Kharkiv, FC Hirnyk Kryvyi Rih, FC Dnipro-75 Dnipropetrovsk, and FC Sumy were deducted three points for non-paying the participation fees; FC Hirnyk Kryvyi Rih, FC Dnipro-75 Dnipropetrovsk, and FC Sumy were deducted additional three points for non-paying the participation fees for the second half of the season. The decision was officially declared by the Disciplinary Committee of PFL on May 28, 2009)	
12	Arsenal Kharkiv	34	11	10	13	36	47	−11	40	Withdrew
13	Hirnyk-Sport Komsomolsk	34	9	8	17	28	45	−17	35	
14	Kremin Kremenchuk	34	10	7	17	43	52	−9	34 (Note: FC Kremin Kremenchuk deducted 3 points by the Ukrainian Football Federation March 26, 2008)	
15	Metalurh-2 Zaporizhzhia	34	9	4	21	35	68	−33	31	
16	Dnipro-75 Dnipropetrovsk	34	8	6	20	28	56	−28	24	
17	FC Sumy	34	6	10	18	27	60	−33	22	Name change (Note: FC Yavir Krasnopillya changed their name to FC Sumy on September 11, 2008)
18	PFC Sevastopol-2	34	2	4	28	17	39	−22	10	Withdrew

(C) Champions; (P) Promoted

==== Withdrawn teams ====
===== PFC Sevastopol-2 Sevastopol =====
PFC Sevastopol-2 withdrew after the winter-break. PFC Sevastopol-2 Sevastopol after 21 games had a record of 2 wins, 4 draws and 15 losses scoring 17 goals and having 39 goals scored against them and were in 17th place in the standings.

===== Arsenal Kharkiv =====
Arsenal withdrew after the season completed failing to receive a professional license.

===== Tytan Donetsk =====
Tytan failed to pay license fees for the next season and subsequently the PFL withdrew their professional status in the league.

=== Top goalscorers ===
Scorer	Goals (Pen.)	Team
(Ukraine) Ihor Bezdolnyi	22 (5)	Titan Armyansk
(Ukraine) Denys Berezhnyi	17 (2)	Hirnyk/Stal^{14}
(Ukraine) Ihor Melnyk	15 (2)	Illichivets-2 Mariupol^{15}
(Ukraine) Vitaliy Ponomar	15 (2)	Shakhtar-3 Donetsk
(Ukraine) Kostiantyn Dudchenko	12	Olkom Melitopol^{15}
(Ukraine) Serhiy Yakovenko	12 (6)	Zirka Kirovohrad

- ^14 Berezhny signed with Stal' during the winter break
- ^15 Melnyk promoted to the main squad of FC Illichivets Mariupol after the winter break
- ^16 Dudchenko signed with Premier League club Dynamo Kyiv (January 9, 2009)

=== Playoff game ===
Due to FC Ihroservice Simferopol failing to pay their license dues for the 2009–10 Ukrainian First League season the PFL allowed an extra team to be promoted. The PFL determined that a playoff game between the 2nd placed teams Druha Liha – Arsenal Bila Tserkva and FC Poltava.

Playoff game to determine promotion

July 12, 2009
17:00 UTC+3

Arsenal Bila Tserkva	1 – 0	FC Poltava
Derevliov 60'	Report

Central Stadium, Cherkasy
Attendance: 300
Referee: Vitaliy Hodulian (Odesa)

== Stadia ==
Rank	Stadium	Capacity	Club
1	CMS^{17} Vinnytsia	25,000	FC Nyva Vinnytsia
2	Army Stadium (SKA)	23,040	FC Karpaty-2 Lviv
3	Stadion Avanhard	20,000	FC Veres Rivne
4	Zirka Stadium	20,000	FC Zirka Kirovohrad
5	Bukovyna Stadium	17,000	FC Bukovyna Chernivtsi
6	Nyva Stadion	14,000	FC Nyva Vinnytsia
7	CMS Ternopil	12,750	FC Nyva Ternopil
8	Stadion CSK ZSU	12,000	CSCA Kyiv
9	Polytechnic Stadium	11,400	FC Kremin Kremenchuk
10	CMS Cherkasy	10,321	FC Dnipro Cherkasy
11	N.I. Horiushkin Memorial Stadium	10,000	FC Shakhtar Sverdlovsk
12	SC^{18} Podillya	10,000	FC Dynamo Khmelnytskyi
13	OOM^{19} Stadion Spartak	6,800	FC Olkom Melitopol
14	SC^{17} Sevastopol	6,000	PFC Sevastopol-2
15	Spartak-ZIGMU Stadium	6,000	FC Metalurh-2 Zaporizhzhia
16	Stadion Khimik	5,000	FC Titan Armyansk
17	Trudovi Rezervy (Labor Reserves)	5,000	FC Ros Bila Tserkva
18	Stadion Lokomotyv	5,000	FC Poltava
19	Stadion Kolos	3,000	FC Yavir Krasnopilya
20	Metalurh Stadium	2,900	FC Stal Dniprodzerzhynsk
21	Arsenal-Bavaria	2,300	FC Arsenal Kharkiv
22	CMS Mykolaiv	1,500	MFK Mykolaiv
23	Olimpik Stadium	1,000	FC Olimpik Donetsk
24	Yunist Stadium	?	FC Hirnyk-Sport Komsomolsk
25	Zapadnyi Stadium	?	FC Illichivets-2 Mariupol

Notes:

- ^17 CMS stands for Central Municipal Stadium, the name of a stadium that doesn't carry any official names, and followed by the city's name where the stadium is located. Usually such stadiums are the property of the city with a generic name "Tsentralnyi" (Central, in Ukrainian)
- ^18 SC stands for Sport Complex abbreviation
- ^19 OOM stands for Oleh Oleksenko Memorial

== See also ==
- 2008–09 Ukrainian Premier League
- 2008–09 Ukrainian First League
- 2008–09 Ukrainian Cup
