= 2009–10 Ukrainian Second League =

Ukrainian Second League
- Season: 2009–10
- Champions: Bukovyna Chernivtsi (Group A); Tytan Armyansk (Group B)
- Runner up: Nyva Vinnytsia; Kremin Kremenchuk
- Relegated: 2 withdrew, 1 expelled
- Top goalscorer: 14 - Vladyslav Korobkin (Bukovyna Chernivtsi)

The 2009–10 Ukrainian Second League was the 19th season of 3rd level professional football in Ukraine. The competitions were divided into two groups according to geographical location in the country – A is western Ukraine and B is eastern Ukraine. Due to the 2009 flu pandemic which affected Ukraine in late October the PFL decide to break for winter earlier than they originally scheduled. The second half of the season began March 14, 2009.

== Competition information ==
Note: Relegation from the League is not covered by the current regulations

The placing of teams in the table is done in the following order:

- number of accumulated points
- difference(GD) between goals for(GF) and goals allowed(GA)
- number of goals for
- The League Fair-play ranking

The next tie-break is a simple draw.

== Team changes ==
=== Admitted teams ===
The following team was promoted from the 2009 Ukrainian Football Amateur League:

- FC Morshyn – first group stage participant (debut)

Also, one reserve team was admitted:

- FC Lviv-2 – (debut)

==== Relegated teams ====
No teams were relegated from the 2008–09 Ukrainian First League due to team withdrawal.

=== Location map ===
Locations of team home grounds in Ukrainian Second League 2009–10

== Competitions ==
=== Group A ===
Pos	Team	Pld	W	D	L	GF	GA	GD	Pts	Promotion or relegation
1	FC Bukovyna Chernivtsi	20	15	3	2	35	12	+23	48	Promoted to First League
2	PFC Nyva Vinnytsia	20	12	4	4	43	16	+27	40	Playoff game winner Promoted to First League
3	FC Bastion Illichivsk	20	11	7	2	44	20	+24	40	
4	MFK Mykolaiv	20	11	6	3	30	13	+17	39	
5	FC Dynamo Khmelnytskyi	20	10	3	7	28	16	+12	33	
6	FC Yednist' Plysky	20	8	5	7	22	21	+1	29	
7	FC Ros Bila Tserkva	20	6	3	11	18	30	−12	21	
8	FC Lviv-2	20	4	7	9	13	25	−12	19	Withdrew (Note: Karpaty-2 Lviv and FC Lviv-2 did not renew their license after the season.)
9	FC Veres Rivne	20	4	4	12	16	41	−25	16	
10	FC Karpaty-2 Lviv	20	5	1	14	17	43	−26	16	Withdrew
11	FC Skala Morshyn	20	1	3	16	11	40	−29	6	Name change (Note: FC Skala Morshyn renamed themselves from FC Morshyn during the winter break.)

==== Withdrawn teams ====
===== CSCA Kyiv =====
CSCA Kyiv ceased its operation and withdrew from the League after the 5th Round on September 4, 2009 due to financial hardship. All of their results were annulled. They played three games in the League and had a record of 1 win and 2 losses with 6 goals scored and 6 allowed. The club was also docked 3 points by the PFL on August 27, 2009 due to failure of payment of league dues.

==== Top goalscorers ====
Scorer	Goals (Pen.)	Team
(Ukraine) Vladyslav Korobkin	14 (3)	Bukovyna Chernivtsi
(Ukraine) Oleksandr Nechyporuk	13 (5)	Bastion Illichivsk
(Ukraine) Serhiy Ditkovsky	12 (2)	Dynamo Khmelnytskyi
(Ukraine) Yevhen Santrapinskykh	10	Bastion Illichivsk
(Ukraine) Oleksiy Kolesnykov	9 (1)	Dynamo Khmelnytskyi

=== Group B ===
Pos	Team	Pld	W	D	L	GF	GA	GD	Pts	Promotion or relegation
1	Tytan Armyansk	26	21	3	2	50	20	+30	66	Promoted to First League
2	Kremin Kremenchuk	26	15	9	2	41	21	+20	54	Playoff game
3	FC Poltava	26	16	6	4	34	16	+18	54	
4	Stal Dniprodzerzhynsk	26	15	6	5	38	23	+15	51	
5	Olimpik Donetsk	26	15	4	7	45	28	+17	49	
6	Shakhtar Sverdlovsk	26	13	7	6	26	15	+11	46	
7	Shakhtar-3 Donetsk	26	10	6	10	33	29	+4	36	
8	FC Sumy	26	10	6	10	32	34	−2	36	(Note: Sumy completed the season but failed license attestation from the Professional Football League of Ukraine for the next season due to various administrative and financial issues.)
9	Hirnyk Kryvyi Rih	26	8	4	14	29	43	−14	28	
10	Olkom Melitopol	26	7	5	14	31	42	−11	26	
11	Hirnyk-Sport Komsomolsk	26	5	7	14	21	35	−14	22	
12	Illichivets-2 Mariupol	26	4	3	19	16	40	−24	15	
13	Dnipro-75 Dnipropetrovsk	26	4	5	17	19	21	−2	14 (Note: Dnipro-75 Dnipropetrovsk deducted 3 points by the PFL on August 27, 2009 due to failure of payment of league dues.)	Expelled
14	Metalurh-2 Zaporizhzhia	26	3	1	22	18	66	−48	10	

==== Expelled teams ====
===== Dnipro-75 Dnipropetrovsk =====
Dnipro-75 Dnipropetrovsk was expelled from the League just prior to the 16th Round on March 18, 2010 due to the inability to pay the spring season dues. All of their spring fixtures are considered technical losses. The club played fifteen games in the League and had a record of 4 wins, 5 draws and 6 losses with 19 goals scored and 21 allowed. Stanislav Kulish was the top scorer with 6 goals of which 3 were scored from the penalty spot.

==== Top goalscorers ====
Scorer	Goals (Pen.)	Team
(Ukraine) Vasyl Klimov	13 (2)	Kremin Kremenchuk
(Ukraine) Kostyantyn Vizyonok	12 (3)	Tytan Armyansk
(Ukraine) Vadym Shavrin	9 (3)	Olimpik Donetsk
(Ukraine) Dmytro Kryviy	9 (4)	Stal Dniprodzerzhynsk
(Ukraine) Serhiy Savchenko	8	Olkom Melitopol/FC Sumy

=== Playoff game ===
At the meeting of the Professional Football League of Ukraine after the season, it was confirmed that Ukrainian First League team FC Desna Chernihiv failed attestation and hence would have their license withdrawn. To allow an extra team to be promoted, the PFL determined that a playoff game between the 2nd placed teams from Druha Liha – Kremin Kremenchuk and Nyva Vinnytsia would determine the vacancy created. This playoff game was played June 28, 2010.

June 28, 2010
17:00 UTC+3

Kremin Kremenchuk	0 – 2	Nyva Vinnytsia
	Report	Kozban 12'; Nayko 48'

Central Stadium, Makariv
Attendance: 700
Referee: Dmytro Kutakov (Brovary)

== Stadia ==
Rank	Stadium	Capacity	Club
1	Shakhtar Stadium	31,718	Shakhtar-3 Donetsk
2	Yuvileyny Stadium	25,800	Sumy
3	Meteor Stadium	24,361	Dnipro-75 Dnipropetrovsk
4	CMS^{(17)} Vinnytsia	24,000	FC Nyva Vinnytsia
5	Army Stadium (SKA)	16,724	FC Karpaty-2 Lviv
6	Stadion Trudovi Rezervy	13,500	FC Ros Bila Tserkva
7	Bukovyna Stadium	12,000	FC Bukovyna Chernivtsi
8	Polytechnic Stadium	11,300	FC Kremin Kremenchuk
9	Horiushkin Memorial Stadium	10,000	FC Shakhtar Sverdlovsk
10	SC Podillia	8,000	FC Dynamo Khmelnytskyi
11	Sokil Stadium	6,000	Morshyn Stryi
12	Stadion Khimik	5,000	FC Titan Armyansk
13	Spartak Stadium (Nizhyn)	5,000	Yednist Plysky
14	Stadion Avanhard	4,500	FC Veres Rivne
15	SC Khimik	3,600	FC Nyva Vinnytsia
16	Zakhidnyi Stadium	3,206	FC Illichivets-2 Mariupol
17	Central Stadium (Makariv)	3,100	Ros Bila Tserkva
18	Metalurh Stadium	2,900	FC Stal Dniprodzerzhynsk
19	Dynamo Training Center	2,700	CSCA Kyiv
20	Nad Buhom Stadium	2,660	Lviv-2 Kamyanka-Buzka
21	Stadion Lokomotyv	2,500	FC Poltava
22	Zhovtneva Mine Stadium	2,500	Hirnyk Kryvyi Rih
23	Yunist Stadium	2,500	FC Hirnyk-Sport Komsomolsk
24	Obukhiv Raion Stadium	2,064	Yednist / Ros
25	Oleksenko Spartak Stadium	2,000	FC Olkom Melitopol
26	Tytan Stadium	2,000	FC Metalurh-2 Zaporizhzhia
27	Azovets Stadium	1,660	FC Illichivets-2 Mariupol
28	CMS Mykolaiv	1,500	MFK Mykolaiv
29	Suputnyk Stadium	1,500	Yednist Plysky
30	School Stadium	1,500	Bastion Illichivsk
31	Kirsha Training Center	1,500	Shakhtar-3 Donetsk
32	Yednist Stadium	1,050	FC Yednist' Plysky^{(20)}
33	SC Olimpik	680	FC Olimpik Donetsk
34	Metalist Academy Stadium	400	FC Kremin Kremenchuk
35	Metalurh Training Center	?	FC Metalurh-2 Zaporizhzhia
36	Budivelnyk Stadium	?	Hirnyk Kryvyi Rih

Notes:

- ^(17) CMS stands for Central Municipal Stadium, the name of a stadium that doesn't carry any official names, and followed by the city's name where the stadium is located. Usually such stadiums are the property of the city with a generic name "Tsentralnyi" (Central, in Ukrainian)
- ^(20) Yednist Plysky also played at SKOR Stadium in Obukhiv, Kyiv Oblast (province) and Spartak Stadium in Nizhyn, Chernihiv Oblast.

== See also ==
- 2009–10 Ukrainian Premier League
- 2009–10 Ukrainian First League
- 2009–10 League Cup (Ukraine)
