= 2013–14 Ukrainian Premier League Reserves and Under 19 =

Ukrainian Premier League Reserves
- Season: 2013–14
- Top goalscorer: 18 – Barannik (Vorskla)

The 2013–14 Ukrainian Premier League Reserves and Under 19 season were competitions between the reserves of Ukrainian Premier League Clubs and the Under 19s. The events in the senior leagues during the 2012–13 season saw no teams relegated with Kryvbas Kryvyi Rih Reserves expelled and Sevastopol Reserves entering the competition.

== Managers ==
Club	Coach	Replaced coach(es)
Arsenal Kyiv Reserves	(Ukraine) Andriy Annenkov	
Chornomorets Odesa Reserves	(Ukraine) Viktor Hryshko (interim)	
Dnipro Dnipropetrovsk Reserves	(Ukraine) Dmytro Mykhaylenko	
Dynamo Kyiv Reserves	(Belarus) Valentin Belkevich	
Illichivets Mariupol Reserves	(Ukraine) Eduard Khavrov	
Hoverla Uzhhorod Reserves	(Ukraine) Mykhaylo Ivanytsya	
Karpaty Lviv Reserves	(Ukraine) Andriy Kuptsov	(Croatia) Igor Jovićević
Metalist Kharkiv Reserves	(Ukraine) Andriy Anischenko	
Metalurh Donetsk Reserves	(Ukraine) Yuriy Virt	(Ukraine) Serhiy Shyshchenko
Metalurh Zaporizhya Reserves	(Ukraine) Andriy Demchenko	
Sevastopol Reserves	(Ukraine) Oleksiy Hrachov	(Ukraine) Hennadiy Orbu
Shakhtar Donetsk Reserves	(Portugal) Miguel Cardoso	
Tavriya Simferopol Reserves	(England) Adam Sadler	
Volyn Lutsk Reserves	(Ukraine) Oleh Fedyukov	
Vorskla Poltava Reserves	(Ukraine) Hennadiy Medvedyev	
Zorya Luhansk Reserves	(Ukraine) Volodymyr Mykytyn	

== Final standings ==
Pos	Team	Pld	W	D	L	GF	GA	GD	Pts	Relegation
1	Illichivets Mariupol reserves	26	17	5	4	51	24	+27	56	
2	Shakhtar Donetsk reserves	26	16	7	3	70	31	+39	55	
3	Dnipro Dnipropetrovsk reserves	26	16	3	7	50	26	+24	51	
4	Metalist Kharkiv reserves	26	14	3	9	44	25	+19	45	
5	Zorya Luhansk reserves	26	12	4	10	42	38	+4	40	
6	Dynamo Kyiv reserves	26	11	6	9	43	30	+13	39	
7	Metalurh Donetsk reserves	26	11	6	9	44	44	0	39	
8	Karpaty Lviv reserves	26	11	6	9	32	33	−1	39	
9	Vorskla Poltava reserves	26	12	1	13	51	54	−3	37	
10	FC Sevastopol reserves	26	10	3	13	53	61	−8	33	Withdrawn due to the Russian occupation of Crimea
11	Metalurh Zaporizhya reserves	27	8	7	12	47	48	−1	31	
12	Chornomorets Odesa reserves	26	7	5	14	31	43	−12	26	
13	Hoverla Uzhhorod reserves	26	5	6	15	32	62	−30	21	
14	Volyn Lutsk reserves	26	5	6	15	30	63	−33	21	
15	Tavriya Simferopol reserves	27	4	6	17	20	58	−38	18	Withdrawn due to the Russian occupation of Crimea
16	Arsenal Kyiv reserves	0	-	-	-	-	-	—	0	Club was officially excluded from the league (Note: On February 12, 2014 Arsenal Kyiv was officially excluded from the league and all club's results were annulled.)

Updated to match(es) played on May 7, 2014. Source: Premier League Reserves website (in Ukrainian)
Rules for classification: 1) points; 2) goal difference; 3) number of goals scored. Relegation is dependent on senior club.

== Top scorers ==
As of 7 May 2014

Scorer	Goals (Pen.)	Team
(Ukraine) Oleh Barannik	18 (3)	Vorskla Poltava Reserves
(Ukraine) Vladlen Yurchenko (Note: In March 1, 2014, Yurchenko went to FC Shakhtar-3 Donetsk on the Ukrainian Second League.)	17 (9)	Shakhtar Donetsk Reserves
(Ukraine) Volodymyr Koval	16 (1)	Sevastopol Reserves
(Ukraine) Farid Ali	11 (0)	Metalurh Zaporizhya Reserves
(Ukraine) Andriy Totovytskyi	11 (1)	Illichivets Mariupol Reserves
(Ukraine) Yasyn Khamid	11 (4)	Metalurh Donetsk Reserves
(Ukraine) Vadym Yavorskyi	10 (1)	Chornomorets Odesa Reserves
(Ukraine) Andriy Bliznichenko	9 (0)	Dnipro Dnipropetrovsk Reserves
(Ukraine) Vladyslav Voytsekhovskyi	9 (2)	Dnipro Dnipropetrovsk Reserves
(Ukraine) Artem Besyedin	8 (0)	Dynamo Kyiv Reserves
(Ukraine) Roman Debelko	8 (0)	Metalurh Donetsk Reserves
(Ukraine) Dmytro Lukanov	8 (1)	Zorya Luhansk Reserves

== Under 19 competition ==
=== First stage ===
==== Group A ====
Pos	Team	Pld	W	D	L	GF	GA	GD	Pts
1	Chornomorets Odesa U19s	14	9	2	3	22	12	+10	29
2	Karpaty Lviv U19s	14	9	1	4	25	14	+11	28
3	Dnipro Dnipropetrovsk U19s	14	7	4	3	29	20	+9	25
4	Dynamo Kyiv U19s	14	7	3	4	31	23	+8	24
5	Volyn Lutsk U19s	14	6	2	6	26	23	+3	20
6	Hoverla Uzhhorod U19s	14	5	1	8	20	27	−7	16
7	Vorskla Poltava U19s	14	3	2	9	16	20	−4	11
8	Arsenal Kyiv U19s	14	2	1	11	13	43	−30	7

Source: Ukrainian Premier League U19 Group A competition
Rules for classification: 1st points; 2nd goal difference; 3rd goals scored; 4th fair play. Relegation is dependent on senior club.

==== Group B ====
Pos	Team	Pld	W	D	L	GF	GA	GD	Pts
1	Shakhtar Donetsk U19s	14	13	1	0	54	9	+45	40
2	Metalist Kharkiv U19s	14	8	2	4	24	13	+11	26
3	Metalurh Zaporizhya U19s	14	8	1	5	23	20	+3	25
4	Metalurh Donetsk U19s	14	7	0	7	22	22	0	21
5	Zorya Luhansk U19s	14	6	2	6	18	16	+2	20
6	Illichivets Mariupol U19s	14	4	2	8	13	29	−16	14
7	FC Sevastopol U19s	14	3	3	8	13	29	−16	12
8	Tavriya Simferopol U19s	14	0	3	11	5	32	−27	3

Source: Ukrainian Premier League U19 Group B competition
Rules for classification: 1st points; 2nd goal difference; 3rd goals scored; 4th fair play. Relegation is dependent on senior club.

=== Top scorers ===
Scorer	Goals (Pen.)	Team
(Ukraine) Orest Kuzyk	6 (0)	Dynamo U-19
(Ukraine) Denys Balanyuk	6 (1)	Dnipro U-19
(Ukraine) Dmytro Plakhtyr	6 (1)	Metalurh Z U-19
(Ukraine) Ivan Zotko	6 (4)	Metalist U-19

== Golden Talent Honours ==
Season's Top 5 Golden Talents
Under – 21			Under – 19		
Rank	Player	Club	Rank	Player	Club
1	Ruslan Malinovskyi	Zorya Luhansk	1	Valeriy Luchkevych	FC Dnipro
2	Serhiy Bolbat	Metalist Kharkiv	2	Mykyta Burda	Dynamo Kyiv
3	Mykyta Shevchenko	Zorya Luhansk	3	Eduard Sobol	Metalurh Donetsk
4	Vladyslav Kalitvintsev	Dynamo Kyiv	4	Roman Pidkivka	Karpaty Lviv
5	Andriy Totovytskyi	Shakhtar Donetsk	5	Oleksandr Kapliyenko	Metalurh Zaporizhia

== See also ==
- 2013-14 Ukrainian Premier League
