= 2014–15 Ukrainian Premier League Reserves and Under 19 =

Ukrainian Premier League Reserves
- Season: 2014–15
- Champions: Dnipro Dnipropetrovsk Reserves
- Relegated: Illichivets Mariupol Reserves
- Top goalscorer: 17 – Zahorulko (Shakhtar)

The 2014–15 Ukrainian Premier League Reserves and Under 19 season were competitions between the reserves of Ukrainian Premier League Clubs and the Under 19s. The events in the senior leagues during the 2013–14 season saw Tavriya Simferopol Reserves relegated with Arsenal Kyiv Reserves and Sevastopol Reserves expelled and Olimpik Reserves entering the competition.

== Managers ==
| Club | Coach | Replaced coach(es) |
|---|---|---|
| Chornomorets Odesa Reserves | (Russia) Gennadiy Nizhegorodov | (Ukraine) Oleksandr Babych |
| Dnipro Dnipropetrovsk Reserves | (Ukraine) Dmytro Mykhaylenko | |
| Dynamo Kyiv Reserves | (Spain) Fernandez Gomez | |
| Illichivets Mariupol Reserves | (Ukraine) Eduard Khavrov | |
| Hoverla Uzhhorod Reserves | (Ukraine) Vyacheslav Pinkovskyi | (Ukraine) Oleksandr Kohutuch (Ukraine) Mykhaylo Ivanytsya |
| Karpaty Lviv Reserves | (Ukraine) Oleksandr Chyzhevskyi | (Ukraine) Roman Zub |
| Metalist Kharkiv Reserves | (Ukraine) Andriy Anischenko | |
| Metalurh Donetsk Reserves | (Ukraine) Serhiy Shyshchenko | |
| Metalurh Zaporizhya Reserves | (Ukraine) Andriy Demchenko | |
| Olimpik Donetsk Reserves | (Ukraine) Ihor Klymovskyi | (Ukraine) Denys Khomutov |
| Shakhtar Donetsk Reserves | (Portugal) Miguel Cardoso | |
| Volyn Lutsk Reserves | (Ukraine) Volodymyr Fihel | (Ukraine) Oleh Fedyukov |
| Vorskla Poltava Reserves | (Ukraine) Oleksandr Omelchuk | |
| Zorya Luhansk Reserves | (Ukraine) Volodymyr Mykytyn | |

== Final standings ==
| Pos | Team | Pld | W | D | L | GF | GA | GD | Pts | Relegation |
|---|---|---|---|---|---|---|---|---|---|---|
| 1 | Dnipro Dnipropetrovsk reserves | 26 | 20 | 2 | 4 | 66 | 16 | +50 | 62 | |
| 2 | Dynamo Kyiv reserves | 26 | 17 | 6 | 3 | 59 | 26 | +33 | 57 | |
| 3 | Vorskla Poltava reserves | 26 | 16 | 3 | 7 | 47 | 20 | +27 | 51 | |
| 4 | Shakhtar Donetsk reserves | 26 | 14 | 5 | 7 | 63 | 31 | +32 | 47 | |
| 5 | Chornomorets Odesa reserves | 26 | 12 | 4 | 10 | 40 | 33 | +7 | 40 | |
| 6 | Metalist Kharkiv reserves | 26 | 12 | 4 | 10 | 37 | 34 | +3 | 40 | |
| 7 | Zorya Luhansk reserves | 26 | 11 | 6 | 9 | 37 | 30 | +7 | 39 | |
| 8 | Karpaty Lviv reserves | 26 | 10 | 6 | 10 | 32 | 32 | 0 | 36 | |
| 9 | Metalurh Zaporizhya reserves | 26 | 10 | 4 | 12 | 34 | 43 | −9 | 34 | |
| 10 | Volyn Lutsk reserves | 26 | 10 | 2 | 14 | 45 | 54 | −9 | 32 | |
| 11 | Metalurh Donetsk reserves | 26 | 9 | 4 | 13 | 51 | 43 | +8 | 31 | Withdrawn due the Russian invasion of the Ukrainian East |
| 12 | Hoverla Uzhhorod reserves | 26 | 5 | 4 | 17 | 23 | 77 | −54 | 19 | |
| 13 | Illichivets Mariupol reserves | 26 | 4 | 5 | 17 | 29 | 61 | −32 | 17 | |
| 14 | Olimpik Donetsk reserves | 26 | 3 | 3 | 20 | 25 | 88 | −63 | 12 | |

Source: Premier League Reserves website (in Ukrainian)
Rules for classification: 1) points; 2) goal difference; 3) number of goals scored. Relegation is dependent on senior club

== Top scorers ==
As of 30 May 2015

| Scorer | Goals (Pen.) | Team |
|---|---|---|
| (Ukraine) Artur Zahorulko | 17 | Shakhtar Donetsk Reserves |
| (Ukraine) Vladyslav Avramenko | 10 | Vorskla Poltava Reserves |
| (Ukraine) Oleksiy Schebetun | 10 | Dynamo Kyiv Reserves |
| (Ukraine) Denys Bezborodko | 10 (1) | Shakhtar Donetsk Reserves |
| (Ukraine) Denys Balanyuk | 9 | Dnipro Dnipropetrovsk Reserves |
| (Ukraine) Denys Halenkov | 9 | Olimpik Donetsk Reserves |
| (Ukraine) Dmytro Ivanisenya | 8 | Shakhtar Donetsk Reserves |
| (Ukraine) Bohdan Mykhaylichenko | 8 | Dynamo Kyiv Reserves |
| (Ukraine) Bohdan Sichkaruk | 8 | Vorskla Poltava Reserves |
| (Ukraine) Maksym Slyusar | 8 (1) | Zorya Luhansk Reserves |
| (Croatia) Mladen Bartulović | 8 (4) | Dnipro Dnipropetrovsk Reserves |

== See also ==
- 2014-15 Ukrainian Premier League
