= 2011–12 Ukrainian Premier League Reserves =

Ukrainian Premier League Reserves
- Season: 2011–12
- Champions: Shakhtar
- Relegated: Obolon; Oleksandria
- Top goalscorer: 14 – Kulach (Shakhtar Reserves)

The 2011–12 Ukrainian Premier League Reserves season was a competition between the reserves of Ukrainian Premier League Clubs. The events in the senior leagues during the 2010–11 season saw Metalurh Zaporizhzhia Reserves and PFC Sevastapol Reserves all relegated and replaced by the promoted teams PFC Oleksandria Reserves and Chornomorets Odesa Reserves.

== Managers ==
Club	Coach	Replaced coach(es)
FC Arsenal Kyiv Reserves and Youth Team	(Ukraine) Taras Kucher	
FC Chornomorets Odesa Reserves and Youth Team	(Ukraine) Ihor Nakonechnyi	
FC Dnipro Dnipropetrovsk Reserves and Youth Team	(Ukraine) Dmytro Mykhaylenko	
FC Dynamo Kyiv Reserves and Youth Team	(Belarus) Alyaksandr Khatskevich	
FC Illichivets Mariupol Reserves and Youth Team	(Ukraine) Oleksandr Volkov	
FC Karpaty Lviv Reserves and Youth Team	(Ukraine) Andriy Sapuha	(Ukraine) Volodymyr Bezubyak
FC Kryvbas Kryvyi Rih Reserves and Youth Team	(Ukraine) Serhiy Mazur	
FC Metalist Kharkiv Reserves and Youth Team	(Ukraine) Andriy Anischenko	
FC Metalurh Donetsk Reserves and Youth Team	(Ukraine) Serhiy Shyshchenko	
FC Obolon Kyiv Reserves and Youth Team	(Ukraine) Vyacheslav Nivinskyi	(Ukraine) Serhiy Konyushenko
PFC Oleksandria Reserves and Youth Team	(Ukraine) Andriy Kuptsov	
FC Shakhtar Donetsk Reserves and Youth Team	(Ukraine) Serhiy Popov	
SC Tavriya Simferopol Reserves and Youth Team	(Switzerland) Pierre-André Schürmann	(Ukraine) Valeriy Petrov (Ukraine) Oleksandr Shudrik
FC Volyn Lutsk Reserves and Youth Team	(Ukraine) Anatoliy Piskovets	
FC Vorskla Poltava Reserves and Youth Team	(Ukraine) Serhiy Svystun	
FC Zorya Luhansk Reserves and Youth Team	(Ukraine) Volodymyr Mykytyn	

== Final standings ==
Pos	Team	Pld	W	D	L	GF	GA	GD	Pts
1	Shakhtar Donetsk reserves	30	21	8	1	78	29	+49	71
2	Zorya Luhansk reserves	30	21	2	7	56	35	+21	65
3	Obolon Kyiv reserves	30	17	2	11	53	36	+17	53
4	Dnipro Dnipropetrovsk reserves	30	16	4	10	55	42	+13	52
5	Illichivets Mariupol reserves	30	14	7	9	51	32	+19	49
6	Metalist Kharkiv reserves	30	13	8	9	49	38	+11	47
7	Vorskla Poltava reserves	30	14	4	12	58	57	+1	46
8	Dynamo Kyiv reserves	30	12	8	10	50	38	+12	44
9	Karpaty Lviv reserves	30	13	4	13	53	64	−11	43
10	Metalurh Donetsk reserves	30	14	0	16	44	50	−6	42
11	Volyn Lutsk reserves	30	9	8	13	50	57	−7	35
12	Kryvbas Kryvyi Rih reserves	30	9	6	15	33	56	−23	33
13	Tavriya Simferopol reserves	30	8	7	15	42	60	−18	31
14	Arsenal Kyiv reserves	30	6	6	18	39	64	−25	24
15	Chornomorets Odesa reserves	30	5	6	19	37	71	−34	21
16	Oleksandria reserves	30	4	8	18	33	52	−19	20

Updated to match(es) played on May 8, 2012. Source: Premier League Reserves website (in Ukrainian)
Rules for classification: 1) points; 2) goal difference; 3) number of goals scored. Relegation is dependent on senior club.

== Top scorers ==
As of May 9, 2012

Scorer	Goals (Pen.)	Team
(Ukraine) Vladyslav Kulach	14	Shakhtar Donetsk Reserves
(Ukraine) Oleksandr Karavayev^{(1)}	12 (1)	Shakhtar Donetsk Reserves
(Ukraine) Oleh Barannik	12 (3)	Vorskla Poltava Reserves
(Ukraine) Oleksandr Filippov	11	Arsenal Kyiv Reserves
(Ukraine) Oleksiy Babyr	11 (2)	Volyn Lutsk Reserves
(Ukraine) Yuriy Yakovenko	11 (2)	Obolon Kyiv Reserves
(Ukraine) Yevhen Pavlov	10 (1)	Volyn Lutsk Reserves
(Ukraine) Vyacheslav Churko	10 (2)	Shakhtar Donetsk Reserves
(Ukraine) Vitaliy Kaverin	9	Dnipro Dnipropetrovsk Reserves
(Ukraine) Semen Zharyi	9	Zorya Luhansk Reserves
(Ukraine) Artur Zahorulko	9 (1)	Shakhtar Donetsk Reserves

- ^(1) During the winter break Karavayev went on loan to FC Sevastopol

== See also ==
- 2011-12 Ukrainian Premier League
