= 2015–16 Ukrainian Premier League Reserves and Under 19 =

Ukrainian Premier League Reserves
- Season: 2015–16
- Top goalscorer: 20 – Boryachuk (Shakhtar)

The 2015–16 Ukrainian Premier League Reserves and Under 19 season were competitions between the reserves of Ukrainian Premier League Clubs and the Under 19s. The events in the senior leagues during the 2014–15 season saw Illichivets Mariupol Reserves relegated with Metalurh Donetsk Reserves expelled with Oleksandriya Reserves and Stal Dniprodzerzhynsk Reserves entering the competition.

== Managers ==
Club	Coach	Replaced coach(es)
Chornomorets Odesa Reserves	(Russia) Gennadiy Nizhegorodov	
Dnipro Dnipropetrovsk Reserves	(Ukraine) Dmytro Mykhaylenko	
Dynamo Kyiv Reserves	(Spain) Fernandez Gomez	
Hoverla Uzhhorod Reserves	(Ukraine) Vyacheslav Pinkovskyi	
Karpaty Lviv Reserves	(Ukraine) Andriy Tlumak	(Ukraine) Oleksandr Chyzhevskyi
Metalist Kharkiv Reserves	(Ukraine) Maksym Kalinichenko	(Ukraine) Oleksandr Pryzetko
Metalurh Zaporizhya Reserves	(Ukraine) Andriy Demchenko	
Oleksandriya Reserves	(Ukraine) Andriy Kuptsov	
Olimpik Donetsk Reserves	(Ukraine) Denys Khomutov	
Shakhtar Donetsk Reserves	(Portugal) Miguel Cardoso	
Stal Dniprodzerzhynsk Reserves	(Ukraine) Serhiy Shyschenko	
Volyn Lutsk Reserves	(Ukraine) Volodymyr Fihel	
Vorskla Poltava Reserves	(Ukraine) Oleksandr Omelchuk	
Zorya Luhansk Reserves	(Ukraine) Volodymyr Mykytyn	

== Final standings ==
Pos	Team	Pld	W	D	L	GF	GA	GD	Pts
1	Dynamo Kyiv reserves (C)	26	20	4	2	71	16	+55	64
2	Shakhtar Donetsk reserves	26	19	3	4	53	25	+28	60
3	Dnipro Dnipropetrovsk reserves	26	17	4	5	45	20	+25	55
4	Stal Dniprodzerzhynsk reserves	26	14	6	6	44	32	+12	48
5	Metalist Kharkiv reserves (W)	26	13	5	8	48	34	+14	44 (Note: FC Metalist Kharkiv reserves and FC Hoverla Uzhhorod reserves had their licenses revoked for the next season and excluded from competition with their respective main squads.)
6	Zorya Luhansk reserves	26	10	7	9	37	35	+2	37
7	Karpaty Lviv reserves	26	11	3	12	40	33	+7	36
8	Chornomorets Odesa reserves	26	10	4	12	42	46	−4	34
9	Vorskla Poltava reserves	26	10	3	13	36	30	+6	33
10	Olimpik Donetsk reserves	26	10	2	14	29	46	−17	32
11	Volyn Lutsk reserves	26	9	3	14	34	53	−19	30
12	Oleksandriya reserves	26	8	4	14	31	39	−8	28
13	Metalurh Zaporizhya reserves (D)	26	2	3	21	14	44	−30	9 (Note: On 17 March 2016 FC Metalurh Zaporizhya reserves excluded from the competition along with main-squad FC Metalurh.)
14	Hoverla Uzhhorod reserves (W)	26	2	3	21	9	80	−71	9

Updated to match(es) played on May 14, 2016. Source: Premier League Reserves website (in Ukrainian)
Rules for classification: 1) points; 2) goal difference; 3) number of goals scored. Relegation is dependent on senior club
(C) Champions; (D) Disqualified; (W) Withdrew

== Top scorers ==
As of 14 May 2016

Scorer	Goals (Pen.)	Team
(Ukraine) Andriy Boryachuk	20 (4)	Shakhtar Donetsk Reserves
(Ukraine) Roman Yaremchuk	18 (3)	Dynamo Kyiv Reserves
(Ukraine) Denys Balanyuk	15	Dnipro Dnipropetrovsk Reserves
(Ukraine) Volodymyr Savoshko	11 (2)	Karpaty Lviv Reserves
(Ukraine) Vladyslav Avramenko	11 (3)	Vorskla Poltava Reserves
(Ukraine) Roman Yalovenko	9	Stal Dniprodzerzhynsk Reserves
(Ukraine) Serhiy Myakushko	9 (1)	Dynamo Kyiv Reserves
(Ukraine) Viktor Tsyhankov	9 (1)	Dynamo Kyiv Reserves
(Ukraine) Volodymyr Odaryuk	8	Vorskla Poltava Reserves
(Ukraine) Denys Halenkov	8 (1)	Olimpik Donetsk Reserves
(Ukraine) Mykhaylo Popov	8 (2)	Chornomorets Odesa Reserves
(Ukraine) Ivan Zotko	8 (5)	Metalist Kharkiv Reserves

== See also ==
- 2015–16 Ukrainian Premier League
