= 2012–13 Ukrainian Premier League Reserves and Under 19 =

Ukrainian Premier Reserve League
- Season: 2012–13
- Champions: Reserves: Zorya Luhansk Reserves; Under 19s: Dynamo Kyiv U19s
- Top goalscorer: 16 – Troyanovskyi (Metalurh D Reserves)

The 2012–13 Ukrainian Premier League Reserves and Under 19 season were competitions between the reserves of Ukrainian Premier League Clubs and the Under 19s. The events in the senior leagues during the 2011–12 season saw Obolon Kyiv Reserves and Oleksandria Reserves all relegated and replaced by the promoted teams Hoverla Uzhhorod Reserves and Metalurh Zaporizhya Reserves.

In 2012 the Premier League expanded the league to include an Under 19 competition. The Under 19 competition is divided into two geographical groups and in the first stage of the competition play a round robin phase.

== Managers ==
Club	Coach	Replaced coach(es)
Arsenal Kyiv Reserves	(Ukraine) Andriy Annenkov	
Chornomorets Odesa Reserves	(Ukraine) Viktor Hryshko (interim)	(Ukraine) Ihor Nakonechnyi
Dnipro Dnipropetrovsk Reserves	(Ukraine) Dmytro Mykhaylenko	
Dynamo Kyiv Reserves	(Belarus) Alyaksandr Khatskevich	
Illichivets Mariupol Reserves	(Ukraine) Eduard Khavrov	
Hoverla Uzhhorod Reserves	(Ukraine) Volodymyr Vasyutyk	
Karpaty Lviv Reserves	(Croatia) Igor Jovićević	(Ukraine) Andriy Sapuha
Kryvbas Kryvyi Rih Reserves	(Ukraine) Oleksandr Hranovskyi	
Metalist Kharkiv Reserves	(Ukraine) Andriy Anischenko	
Metalurh Donetsk Reserves	(Ukraine) Serhiy Shyshchenko	
Metalurh Zaporizhya Reserves	(Ukraine) Ihor Luchkevych	(Ukraine) Hryhoriy Nehiryev (Ukraine) Volodymyr Khokhlov
Shakhtar Donetsk Reserves	(Ukraine) Hennadiy Orbu	(Ukraine) Serhiy Popov
Tavriya Simferopol Reserves	(Ukraine) Andriy Chykh	(Ukraine) Viktor Smihunov
Volyn Lutsk Reserves	(Ukraine) Oleh Fedyukov	(Ukraine) Anatoliy Piskovets
Vorskla Poltava Reserves	(Ukraine) Volodymyr Prokopinenko	(Ukraine) Serhiy Svystun
Zorya Luhansk Reserves	(Ukraine) Volodymyr Mykytyn	

== Reserves competition ==
=== Final standings ===
Pos	Team	Pld	W	D	L	GF	GA	GD	Pts	Relegation
1	Zorya Luhansk Reserves	30	20	3	7	53	22	+31	63	
2	Dynamo Kyiv Reserves	30	18	7	5	69	31	+38	61	
3	Shakhtar Donetsk Reserves	30	16	5	9	67	38	+29	53	
4	Vorskla Poltava Reserves	30	15	8	7	59	42	+17	53	
5	Illichivets Mariupol Reserves	30	13	9	8	34	31	+3	48	
6	Metalist Kharkiv Reserves	30	14	4	12	47	43	+4	46	
7	Metalurh Zaporizhya Reserves	30	12	8	10	40	35	+5	44	
8	Dnipro Dnipropetrovsk Reserves	30	12	7	11	52	47	+5	43	
9	Karpaty Lviv Reserves	30	12	5	13	38	52	−14	41	
10	Metalurh Donetsk Reserves	30	11	7	12	58	47	+11	40	
11	Volyn Lutsk Reserves	30	10	7	13	45	46	−1	37	
12	Arsenal Kyiv Reserves	30	9	8	13	37	46	−9	35	
13	Kryvbas Kryvyi Rih Reserves	30	10	5	15	39	51	−12	35	Expelled
14	Chornomorets Odesa Reserves	30	8	6	16	37	66	−29	30	
15	Tavriya Simferopol Reserves	30	6	5	19	22	61	−39	23	
16	Hoverla Uzhhorod Reserves	30	4	6	20	33	77	−44	18	

Source: Ukrainian Premier League Reserves competition
Rules for classification: 1st points; 2nd goal difference; 3rd goals scored; 4th fair play. Relegation is dependent on senior club.

=== Top scorers ===
As of 29 May 2013

Scorer	Goals (Pen.)	Team
(Ukraine) Yevhen Troyanovskyi	16 (2)	Metalurh Donetsk Reserves
(Ukraine) Yevhen Bokhashvili	14 (4)	Dnipro Dnipropetrovsk Reserves
(Ukraine) Bohdan Boychuk	12 (1)	Metalist Kharkiv Reserves
(Ukraine) Oleksiy Chychykov	11 (1)	Vorskla Poltava Reserves
(Ukraine) Dmytro Khlyobas (Note: During the winter break Khlyobas went to Dynamo-2 Kyiv)	11 (1)	Dynamo Kyiv Reserves
(Ukraine) Taras Stretovych	11 (1)	Kryvbas Kryvyi Rih Reserves
(Ukraine) Serhiy Kurta	10	Hoverla Uzhhorod Reserves
(Ukraine) Artem Radchenko	10 (1)	Metalist Kharkiv Reserves
(Ukraine) Serhiy Rybalka (Note: During the winter break Rybalka went on loan to Slovan Liberec)	10 (6)	Dynamo Kyiv Reserves
(Ukraine) Giuli Mandzhgaladze	9	Zorya Luhansk Reserves
(Ukraine) Dmytro Lukanov	9 (1)	Zorya Luhansk Reserves

== Under 19 competition ==
=== First stage ===
==== Group A ====
Pos	Team	Pld	W	D	L	GF	GA	GD	Pts
1	Dynamo Kyiv U19s	14	11	2	1	34	13	+21	35
2	Karpaty Lviv U19s	14	7	1	6	24	19	+5	22
3	Vorskla Poltava U19s	14	6	4	4	25	22	+3	22
4	Arsenal Kyiv U19s	14	5	4	5	23	25	−2	19
5	Volyn Lutsk U19s	14	5	3	6	21	22	−1	18
6	Kryvbas Kryvyi Rih U19s	14	4	5	5	19	25	−6	17
7	Chornomorets Odesa U19s	14	4	3	7	15	22	−7	15
8	Hoverla Uzhhorod U19s	14	2	2	10	10	23	−13	8

Source: Ukrainian Premier League U19 Group A competition
Rules for classification: 1st points; 2nd goal difference; 3rd goals scored; 4th fair play. Relegation is dependent on senior club.

==== Group B ====
Pos	Team	Pld	W	D	L	GF	GA	GD	Pts
1	Illichivets Mariupol U19s	14	8	2	4	34	20	+14	26
2	Shakhtar Donetsk U19s	14	7	2	5	26	17	+9	23
3	Zorya Luhansk U19s	14	6	4	4	24	21	+3	22
4	Metalurh Donetsk U19s	14	6	4	4	23	23	0	22
5	Metalurh Zaporizhya U19s	14	6	3	5	21	23	−2	21
6	Dnipro Dnipropetrovsk U19s	14	6	1	7	17	20	−3	19
7	Metalist Kharkiv U19s	14	3	3	8	21	31	−10	12
8	Tavriya Simferopol U19s	14	3	3	8	14	25	−11	12

Source: Ukrainian Premier League U19 Group B competition
Rules for classification: 1st points; 2nd goal difference; 3rd goals scored; 4th fair play. Relegation is dependent on senior club.

=== Second stage ===
==== Group 1 ====
Pos	Team	Pld	W	D	L	GF	GA	GD	Pts
1	Dynamo Kyiv U19s	14	11	2	1	42	8	+34	35
2	Illichivets Mariupol U19s	14	10	2	2	28	15	+13	32
3	Shakhtar Donetsk U19s	14	7	3	4	30	15	+15	24
4	Karpaty Lviv U19s	14	8	0	6	26	21	+5	24
5	Zorya Luhansk U19s	14	4	3	7	15	17	−2	15
6	Metalurh Donetsk U19s	14	5	0	9	15	31	−16	15
7	Arsenal Kyiv U19s	14	2	3	9	15	38	−23	9
8	Vorskla Poltava U19s	14	1	3	10	14	41	−27	6

Source: Ukrainian Premier League U19 Group B competition
Rules for classification: 1st points; 2nd goal difference; 3rd goals scored; 4th fair play. Relegation is dependent on senior club.

==== Group 2 ====
Pos	Team	Pld	W	D	L	GF	GA	GD	Pts	Relegation
1	Tavriya Simferopol U19s	14	10	2	2	30	18	+12	32	
2	Metalurh Zaporizhya U19s	14	9	3	2	26	8	+18	30	
3	Dnipro Dnipropetrovsk U19s	14	9	1	4	38	21	+17	28	
4	Metalist Kharkiv U19s	14	7	3	4	32	15	+17	24	
5	Hoverla Uzhhorod U19s	14	5	1	8	19	38	−19	16	
6	Volyn Lutsk U19s	14	3	2	9	9	21	−12	11	
7	Chornomorets Odesa U19s	14	3	1	10	13	28	−15	10	
8	Kryvbas Kryvyi Rih U19s	14	2	3	9	13	31	−18	9	Expelled

Source: Ukrainian Premier League U19 Group A competition
Rules for classification: 1st points; 2nd goal difference; 3rd goals scored; 4th fair play. Relegation is dependent on senior club.

=== Top scorers ===
Scorer	Goals (Pen.)	Team
(Ukraine) Roman Yaremchuk	14 (0)	Dynamo U-19
(Ukraine) Mykyta Adamenko	9 (0)	Shakhtar U-19
(Ukraine) Artur Miranyan	9 (0)	Shakhtar U-19

== Golden Talent Honours ==
Season's Top 5 Golden Talents
Under – 21			Under – 19		
Rank	Player	Club	Rank	Player	Club
1	Ivan Ordets	Illichivets Mariupol	1	Eduard Sobol	Shakhtar Donetsk
2	Serhiy Bolbat	Metalurh Donetsk	2	Dmytro Yarchuk	Tavriya Simferopol
3	Maksym Koval	Dynamo Kyiv	3	Ivan Petryak	Zorya Luhansk
4	Oleksandr Karavayev	FC Sevastopol	4	Bohdan Sarnavskyi	Arsenal Kyiv
5	Redvan Memeshev	Volyn Lutsk	5	Denys Miroshnichenko	Karpaty Lviv

== See also ==
- 2012–13 Ukrainian Premier League
