= Ihor Kiriyenko =

Ukrainian footballer

Personal information
- Full name: Ihor Serhiyovych Kiriyenko
- Date of birth: 5 March 1986 (age 40)
- Place of birth: Nikopol, Soviet Union (now Ukraine)
- Height: 1.87 m (6 ft 2 in)
- Position: Striker

Team information
- Current team: Shevardeni-1906 Tbilisi
- Number: 9

Senior career*
Years	Team	Apps	(Gls)
2002–2003	Elektrometalurh-NZF Nikopol	26	(6)
2004–2005	Illichivets Mariupol	1	(0)
2004–2007	→ llichivets-2 Mariupol	44	(11)
2007	Enerhiya Yuzhnoukrainsk	24	(14)
2008	Hirnyk Kryvyi Rih	13	(1)
2009–2013	Kremin Kremenchuk	22	(5)
2013–2016	Hirnyk-Sport Komsomolsk	90	(46)
2017–2019	Desna Chernihiv	27	(2)
2018–2019	→ Avanhard Kramatorsk (loan)	49	(19)
2019–2020	Avanhard Kramatorsk	8	(1)
2020–2021	Dinaz Vyshhorod	21	(8)
2021–2022	Olimpik Donetsk	15	(1)
2022–	Shevardeni-1906 Tbilisi	12	(2)

International career^{‡}
2003	Ukraine U17	1	(0)
- * Club domestic league appearances and goals as of 24 May 2022 ‡ National team caps and goals as of 11 February 2022

Ihor Serhiyovych Kiriyenko (Ukrainian: Ігор Сергійович Кірієнко; born 5 March 1986) is a Ukrainian professional footballer who plays as a striker.

== Playing career ==
Native of Nikopol, Kiriyenko is a product of its football school who played for Nikopol teams in the nation youth league in 1999–2002 (Kolos and Elektrometalurh).

In 2004–2007 he represented the top league Illichivets Mariupol (later FC Mariupol), but played mostly for its reserve teams.

Ihor Kiriyenko transferred to FC Kremin Kremenchuk during 2009 winter transfer window.

Most notable period of his career was in 2013–2016 when Kiriyenko was playing for Hirnyk-Sport Komsomolsk and scored 46 goals. In 2013–14 Ukrainian Second League he helped Hirnyk-Sport to win the Second League and was a runner-up on the top scorer list for the season with 27 tallies.

=== Dinaz Vyshhorod ===
On 19 March 2021, he scored two goals in the winning match against Chaika.

=== Olimpik Donetsk ===
In summer 2021 he moved to Olimpik Donetsk and he made his debut in Ukrainian First League scoring a goal in the season 2021–22 against Kryvbas Kryvyi Rih.

=== Shevardeni-1906 Tbilisi ===
In February 2022, he moved in Georgia to Shevardeni-1906 Tbilisi in Erovnuli Liga 2.

== National team ==
In 2003, he was called up to play for the 23-man squad of the Ukraine U17.

== Career statistics ==
=== Club ===
As of match played 24 May 2022

Club	Season	League			Ukrainian Cup		Europe League		Total	
Club	Season	Division	Apps	Goals	Apps	Goals	Apps	Goals	Apps	Goals
Elektrometalurh-NZF	Ukrainian Second League	2002–03	12	1	0	0	0	0	12	1
Elektrometalurh-NZF	Ukrainian Second League	2003–04	14	5	1	0	0	0	15	5
Illichivets	Ukrainian Premier League	2003–04	1	0	0	0	0	0	1	0
Illichivets	Ukrainian Premier League	2004–05	0	0	1	0	0	0	1	0
llichivets-2	Ukrainian Second League	2003–04	11	2	0	0	0	0	11	2
llichivets-2	Ukrainian Second League	2004–05	14	4	0	0	0	0	14	4
llichivets-2	Ukrainian Second League	2005–06	15	5	0	0	0	0	15	5
llichivets-2	Ukrainian Second League	2006–07	4	0	0	0	0	0	4	0
llichivets Reserves	Ukrainian Premier League Reserves	2004–05	15	3	0	0	0	0	15	3
llichivets Reserves	Ukrainian Premier League Reserves	2005–06	10	0	0	0	0	0	10	0
llichivets Reserves	Ukrainian Premier League Reserves	2006–07	4	1	0	0	0	0	4	1
Enerhiya	Ukrainian Second League	2006–07	10	5	0	0	0	0	10	5
Enerhiya	Ukrainian Second League	2007–08	14	9	1	1	0	0	15	10
Hirnyk	Ukrainian Second League	2007–08	13	1	0	0	0	0	13	1
Kremin	Ukrainian Second League	2008–09	12	2	0	0	0	0	12	2
Kremin	Ukrainian Second League	2009–10	19	4	1	0	0	0	20	4
Kremin	Ukrainian Second League	2010–11	0	0	0	0	0	0	0	0
Kremin	Ukrainian Second League	2011–12	5	1	0	0	0	0	5	1
Kremin	Ukrainian Second League	2012–13	4	0	0	0	0	0	4	0
Horishni Plavni	Ukrainian Second League	2012–13	8	6	0	0	0	0	8	6
Horishni Plavni	Ukrainian Second League	2013–14	33	27	1	0	0	0	34	27
Horishni Plavni	Ukrainian First League	2014–15	13	6	1	0	0	0	14	6
Horishni Plavni	Ukrainian First League	2015–16	20	1	1	0	0	0	21	1
Horishni Plavni	Ukrainian First League	2016–17	16	6	1	0	0	0	17	6
Desna Chernihiv	Ukrainian First League	2016–17	12	1	0	0	0	0	12	1
Desna Chernihiv	Ukrainian Premier League	2017–18	15	1	2	0	0	0	17	1
Kramatorsk	Ukrainian First League	2018–19	13	3	0	0	0	0	13	3
Kramatorsk	Ukrainian First League	2019–20	8	1	1	0	0	0	9	1
Dinaz Vyshhorod	Ukrainian Second League	2020–21	21	8	2	0	0	0	23	8
Olimpik Donetsk	Ukrainian First League	2021–22	15	1	1	0	0	0	16	1
Shevardeni-1906 Tbilisi	Erovnuli Liga 2	2022	12	2	0	0	0	0	12	2
Career total			352	105	14	1	0	0	377	107

=== International ===
As of match played 29 April 2022

Ukraine Under 17
Year	Apps	Goals
2003	1	0
Total	1	0

== Honours ==
Kremin Kremenchuk

- Ukrainian Second League: 2018–19

Desna Chernihiv

- Ukrainian First League: 2017–18

Hirnyk-Sport Komsomolsk

- Ukrainian Second League: 2013–14

Dinaz Vyshhorod

- Ukrainian Second League: Runner-Up 2020–21

Illichivets-2 Mariupol

- Ukrainian Second League: Runner-Up 2005–06

Elektrometalurh-NZF Nikopol

- Ukrainian Second League: Runner-Up 2003–04

Individual

- Best Player of Round 13 of Ukrainian Second League: 2020–21
- Best Player of Round 13 of Ukrainian First League: 2018–19
- Best Player of Round 21 of Ukrainian First League: 2018–19
- Top Scorer Ukrainian Second League: Runner-up 2013–14 (27 goals)
