= Ukrainian Premier League Under-21 and Under-19 =

The Ukrainian Premier League youth competitions are a set of youth competitions within the Ukrainian Premier League and are part of youth competitions in Ukraine. The events include championships in two age categories: under-19 and under-21. Along with the top-tier competitions (Ukrainian Premier League), the competitions have been held since 2004. These competitions are held separately from the bigger National League of Future (previously the Ukrainian Youth Football League).

Originally, those competitions were designed for reserve teams of the PFL Higher League clubs; since 2008, they have been age-restricted for the under-21 junior teams. The competition was known as the UPL youth competition (molodizhnyi chempionat). In 2012, an additional competition was added for under-19 teams, held in parallel with the under-21 team's competition. Following the 2020–21 season, the competition for under-21 teams was discontinued. In the 2025–26 season, the competition for the under-19 teams was renamed the National League, and the following season, it separated from the Ukrainian Premier League (UPL). In its place, the UPL revived its under-21 competitions as the UPL-2.

== Historical background of junior competitions ==
=== First steps ===
Soon after establishing the Professional Football League of Ukraine (PFL) in 1996, a discussion arose about developing a younger generation of football players. In 1998, in Ukraine, the academies of the PFL football clubs held their first set of competitions, which were conducted in two age categories. In 2001 there was established a separate organization, Ukrainian Youth Football League (Ukrainian: Дитячо-юнацька футбольна ліга України), that took over the administration of those youth competitions. Originally, competitions were conducted in four age groups between 14 and 17. In 2002 in coordination with the PFL there was introduced competition among youth under 19 years of age.

=== Ukrainian Youth Football League championship among junior teams (Unofficial competitions) ===
Season	Champion	Runner-up	Third place	Most valuable player
2002-03	FC Shakhtar Donetsk	FC Kryvbas Kryvyi Rih	SC Tavriya Simferopol	
2003-04	SC Tavriya Simferopol	FC Shakhtar Donetsk	MFC Oleksandriya	
2004-05	MFC Oleksandriya	FC Kryvbas Kryvyi Rih	FC Lokomotyv Odessa	
2005-06	FC Obriy Nikopol	FC Lokomotyv Odessa	FC Luzhany	

=== Reserves competitions ===
In 2004, the PFL introduced competition for the PFL Higher League (Vyshcha Liha) clubs' double teams (reserve teams). The reason for the introduction of the PFL Higher League competitions for doubles was partly connected with the necessity to free the PFL lower league competitions from the Higher League clubs' second teams. With the introduction of the double competitions in 2004, professional clubs started to remove their second teams from the 2004-05 Ukrainian Second League and even more in the following season. The age restriction for the PFL Higher League double teams at first was conditional. In 2006, the PFL discontinued joint youth competition among under-19 teams conducted along with the Youth Football League.

=== Conversion of reserve competitions and addition of other UPL junior competitions ===
In 2008, the Ukrainian Premier League was established, which took over the administration of the PFL Higher League clubs' competitions, including competitions for double teams. Those competitions were renamed as the UPL championship and the UPL youth championship. The UPL youth competition became age-restricted and involved players under 21 years.

In 2012, the Ukrainian Premier League added competitions for under-19 teams. To avoid ambiguity, the UPL youth championship was renamed as the UPL U-21 championship, while the other competition received the name of UPL U-19 championship.

=== Plans of establishing separate professional junior league competitions ===
In 2016 the competitions among youth teams with age category under 19 years of age were reintroduced in the Professional Football League now for teams of the Persha Liha and Druha Liha (First and Second leagues), as well as amateur level youth football-oriented institutions, i.e. youth football clubs, sports schools. The competitions received the name of Persha Liha U-19 competitions. In 2017 discussions were taking place to expand the UPL to include competitions of the Persha Liha (First League) as well as the Persha Liha U-19 competitions and allowing exchange between Premier League and First League among the youth teams.

The UPL youth competitions are considered as a development league and therefore its participants' performance does not result in the team's relegation from it. The relegation occurs only based on their final league position of their respective senior teams in the Ukrainian Premier League. If the senior team is relegated from the Ukrainian Premier League, then its reserve team is relegated from the Premier Reserve League and replaced by a reserve team of another newly promoted club from the Ukrainian First League.

== Under-21 results ==
UPL U-21 championship
- Founded: 2004 (as PFL Higher League reserves championship)
- Country: Ukraine
- Current champions: Dynamo Kyiv
- Most championships: 8 – Dynamo Kyiv

=== PFL Higher League (Vyshcha Liha) championship for reserve teams ===
Season	Champion	Runner-up	Third place	Top goalscorer
2004–05	Dynamo Kyiv	Metalist Kharkiv	Illichivets Mariupol	(Argentina) Roberto Nanni (Dynamo Kyiv, 9 goals) (Belarus) Syarhey Karnilenka (Dynamo Kyiv, 9 goals)
2005–06	Dynamo Kyiv	Metalist Kharkiv	Illichivets Mariupol	(Ukraine) Serhiy Davydov (Metalist Kharkiv, 21 goals)
2006–07	Dynamo Kyiv	Shakhtar Donetsk	Chornomorets Odesa	(Ukraine) Oleksandr Aliyev (Dynamo Kyiv, 21 goals)
2007–08	Dynamo Kyiv	Metalurh Zaporizhya	Metalist Kharkiv	(Ukraine) Oleksandr Aliyev (Dynamo Kyiv, 18 goals)

=== Ukrainian Premier League youth's (U-21) championship ===
Season	Champion	Runner-up	Third place	Top goalscorer
2008–09	Shakhtar Donetsk	Dynamo Kyiv	Chornomorets Odesa	(Ukraine) Roman Zozulya (Dynamo Kyiv, 19 goals)
2009–10	Karpaty Lviv	Shakhtar Donetsk	Dynamo Kyiv	(Ukraine) Yuriy Furta (Karpaty Lviv, 15 goals) (Ukraine) Artem Hromov (Vorskla Poltava, 15 goals)
2010–11	Shakhtar Donetsk	Metalist Kharkiv	Dnipro Dnipropetrovsk	(Ukraine) Yevhen Budnik (Metalist Kharkiv, 13 goals) (Ukraine) Oleh Barannik (Vorskla Poltava, 13 goals)
2011–12	Shakhtar Donetsk	Zorya Luhansk	Obolon Kyiv	(Ukraine) Vladyslav Kulach (Shakhtar Donetsk, 14 goals)
2012–13	Zorya Luhansk	Dynamo Kyiv	Shakhtar Donetsk	(Ukraine) Yevhen Troyanovskyi (Metalurh Donetsk, 16 goals)
2013–14	Illichivets Mariupol	Shakhtar Donetsk	Dnipro Dnipropetrovsk	(Ukraine) Oleh Barannik (Vorskla Poltava, 18 goals)
2014–15	Dnipro Dnipropetrovsk	Dynamo Kyiv	Vorskla Poltava	(Ukraine) Artur Zahorulko (Shakhtar Donetsk, 17 goals)
2015–16	Dynamo Kyiv	Shakhtar Donetsk	Dnipro Dnipropetrovsk	(Ukraine) Andriy Boryachuk (Shakhtar Donetsk, 20 goals)
2016–17	Dynamo Kyiv	Shakhtar Donetsk	Karpaty Lviv	(Ukraine) Stanislav Bilenkyi (Olimpik Donetsk, 16 goals)
2017–18	Shakhtar Donetsk	Dynamo Kyiv	FC Oleksandriya	(Ukraine) Bohdan Lyednyev (Dynamo Kyiv, 16 goals)
2018–19	Dynamo Kyiv	FC Oleksandriya	Shakhtar Donetsk	(Ukraine) Andriy Kulakov (Shakhtar Donetsk, 14 goals)
2019–20	(Shakhtar Donetsk)	(Dynamo Kyiv)	(Vorskla Poltava)	( (Ukraine) Illia Shevtsov (Desna Chernihiv, 13 goals))
2020–21	Dynamo Kyiv	Shakhtar Donetsk	Rukh Lviv	(Ukraine) Vladyslav Vanat (Dynamo Kyiv, 26 goals)

=== Top three ===
All-time U-21 UPL scorers
**Rank**	**Player**	**Goals**	**Games**
1	(Ukraine) Oleksandr Aliev	68	
2	(Ukraine) Oleh Barannik	58	
3	(Ukraine) Serhiy Davydov	50	
4	(Ukraine) Yevhen Bokhashvili	49	
5	(Ukraine) Oleksandr Antonenko	41	
6	(Ukraine) Artur Zahorulko	40	
7	(Ukraine) Yuriy Furta	37	
8	(Ukraine) Andriy Boryachuk	36	
9	(Ukraine) Yevhen Budnik	35	
9	(Ukraine) Yevhen Troyanovskyi	35	
Players **in bold** are still playing in UPL under-21 Data as of 31 October 2018

Club	Winner	Runner-up	Winning years
Dynamo U-21	8	4	2005, 2006, 2007, 2008, 2016, 2017, 2019, 2021
Shakhtar U-21	4	6	2009, 2011, 2012, 2018, (2020)
Zorya U-21	1	1	2013
Dnipro U-21	1	0	2015
Mariupol U-21	1	0	2014
Karpaty U-21	1	0	2010
Metalist U-21	0	3	
Oleksandriya U-21	0	1	
Metalurh U-21	0	1	

=== All-time table ===
There was a total of 17 seasons in the UPL competitions among under-21 teams.

clubs that lost professional status or were dissolved

Rank	Team	Seasons	P	W	D	L	GF	GA	Pts	Achievement	Other names used
1	**Dynamo Kyiv**	15	444	276	82	76	1059	430	940	champions (7)	
2	**Shakhtar Donetsk**	15	444	260	79	105	971	521	859	champions (4)	
3	**Vorskla Poltava**	15	444	201	80	163	702	573	683	3rd (1)	
4	Dnipro	13	380	190	72	118	691	475	642	champions (1)	
5	Metalist Kharkiv	12	348	179	59	110	587	436	596	vice champions (3)	
6	**Karpaty Lviv**	13	384	174	74	136	632	536	596	champions (1)	
7	Chornomorets Odesa	14	414	168	75	171	632	636	579	3rd (2)	
8	**FC Mariupol**	12	356	164	68	124	569	497	560	champions (1)	
9	**Zorya Luhansk**	13	384	160	64	160	534	550	544	champions (1)	
10	Metalurh Zaporizhia	11	319	126	68	125	470	456	446	vice champions (1)	
11	Metalurh Donetsk	11	322	119	57	146	489	495	414	5th (1)	
12	Arsenal Kyiv	10	302	90	51	161	343	537	321	6th (1)	
13	Kryvbas Kryvyi Rih	9	270	82	47	141	313	473	293	8th (1)	
14	Volyn Lutsk	9	260	79	43	138	377	578	280	9th (1)	
15	Tavriya Simferopol	10	297	69	60	168	327	597	267	10th (1)	
16	**FC Oleksandriya**	5	152	53	42	57	185	187	201	vice champions (1)	
17	Obolon Kyiv	4	120	50	24	46	165	168	174	3rd (1)	
18	FC Kharkiv	4	120	44	18	58	168	222	150	6th (1)	
19	Olimpik Donetsk	5	148	41	23	84	174	281	146	4th (1)	
20	Hoverla Uzhhorod	8	228	34	39	155	179	597	141	12th (1)	
21	Stal Kamianske	3	90	31	25	34	133	166	118	4th (1)	
22	Stal Alchevsk	2	60	17	11	32	72	106	62	14th (1)	
23	FC Sevastopol	2	56	19	5	32	89	126	62	10th (1)	
24	**FC Lviv**	2	62	14	8	40	64	140	50	11th (1)	
25	Zirka Kropyvnytskyi	2	64	8	14	42	54	143	38	12th (1)	
26	Naftovyk Okhtyrka	1	30	10	6	14	38	46	36	11th (1)	
27	Borysfen Boryspil	1	30	7	9	14	29	41	30	14th (1)	
28	**Desna Chernihiv**	1	32	8	4	20	41	81	28	10th (1)	
29	Veres Rivne	1	32	6	9	17	31	60	27	10th (1)	

== Under-19 results ==
UPL U-19 championship
- Founded: 2012
- Country: Ukraine
- Current champions: Dynamo Kyiv
- Most championships: 6 – Dynamo Kyiv

=== Premier League junior (U-19) championship ===
Season	Champion	Runner-up	Third place	Top goalscorer
2012–13	Dynamo Kyiv	Illichivets Mariupol	Shakhtar Donetsk	(Ukraine) Roman Yaremchuk (Dynamo Kyiv, 14 goals)
2013–14	Metalist Kharkiv	Shakhtar Donetsk	Karpaty Lviv	(Ukraine) Artur Miranyan (Shakhtar Donetsk, 12 goals)
2014–15	Shakhtar Donetsk	Dynamo Kyiv	Karpaty Lviv	(Ukraine) Ihor Karpenko (Karpaty Lviv, 16 goals)
2015–16	Dynamo Kyiv	Olimpik Donetsk	Shakhtar Donetsk	(Ukraine) Vladyslav Khomutov (Olimpik Donetsk, 15 goals)
2016–17	Dynamo Kyiv	Oleksandriya	Shakhtar Donetsk	(Ukraine) Mykhailo Plokhotnyuk (Chornomorets Odesa, 19 goals)
2017–18	Dynamo Kyiv	Shakhtar Donetsk	Karpaty Lviv	(Ukraine) Yevhen Isayenko (Dynamo Kyiv, 17 goals)
2018–19	Dynamo Kyiv	Shakhtar Donetsk	Karpaty Lviv	(Ukraine) Artem Bondarenko (Shakhtar Donetsk, 20 goals)
2019–20	(Dynamo Kyiv)	(Shakhtar Donetsk)	(Vorskla Poltava)	( (Ukraine) Abdulla Abdullayev (Shakhtar Donetsk, 21 goals))
2020–21	Shakhtar Donetsk	Dynamo Kyiv	Zorya Luhansk	(Ukraine) Kiril Popov (Dynamo Kyiv, 19 goals)
2021–22	(Rukh Lviv)	(Dynamo Kyiv)	(Shakhtar Donetsk)	(Ukraine) Daniel Kivinda (SC Dnipro-1, 14 goals)
2022–23	Rukh Lviv	Dynamo Kyiv	Shakhtar Donetsk	(Ukraine) Vladyslav Pohorilyi (Shakhtar Donetsk, 16 goals)
2023–24	Dynamo Kyiv	Shakhtar Donetsk	SC Dnipro-1	(Ukraine) Matviy Ponomarenko (Dynamo Kyiv, 24 goals)
2024–25	Dynamo Kyiv	Shakhtar Donetsk	Karpaty Lviv	(Ukraine) Dmytriy Kremchanin (Dynamo Kyiv, 23 goals)
2025–26	Shakhtar Donetsk	Dynamo Kyiv	Veres Rivne	(The Gambia) Muhamadou Kanteh (Shakhtar Donetsk, 28 goals)

=== Top three ===
Club	Winner	Runner-up	Winning years
Dynamo U-19	7	5	2013, 2016, 2017, 2018, 2019, (2020), 2024, 2025
Shakhtar U-19	3	5	2015, 2021, 2026
Rukh U-19	1	0	(2022), 2023
Metalist U-19	1	0	2014
Mariupol U-19	0	1	
FC Oleksandriya U-19	0	1	
Olimpik U-19	0	1	

=== All-time table ===
At the end of the 2018–19 season

clubs that lost professional status or were dissolved

Rank	Team	Seasons	P	W	D	L	GF	GA	Pts	Achievement	Other names used
1	**Dynamo Kyiv**	7	188	139	20	29	495	168	437	champions (5)	
2	**Shakhtar Donetsk**	7	188	128	28	32	472	171	412	champions (1)	
3	**Karpaty Lviv**	7	188	104	26	58	362	256	338	3rd (4)	
4	**Zorya Luhansk**	7	185	76	37	72	264	246	265	5th (2)	
5	Chornomorets Odesa	7	188	73	34	81	254	265	253	4th (2)	
6	**Vorskla Poltava**	7	184	68	44	72	259	271	248	5th (1)	
7	**FC Mariupol**	6	157	60	30	67	228	260	210	vice champions (1)	
8	**Volyn Lutsk**	6	157	61	18	78	249	269	201	4th (1)	
9	Dnipro	5	136	60	20	56	232	220	200	4th (1)	
10	**Metalurh Zaporizhia**	5	134	56	13	67	215	225	175	7th (1)	
11	Olimpik Donetsk	5	132	46	28	58	171	188	166	vice champions (1)	
12	**FC Oleksandriya**	4	108	43	20	45	141	140	149	vice champions (1)	
13	Metalist Kharkiv	4	110	43	15	52	162	166	144	champions (1)	
14	Skala Stryi	4	108	38	22	48	130	178	136	6th (1)	
15	Arsenal Kyiv	5	130	32	21	67	168	274	117	7th (1)	
16	Metalurh Donetsk	3	78	32	10	36	122	139	106	6th (1)	
17	Stal Kamianske	3	82	27	16	39	106	152	97	5th (1)	
18	Hoverla Uzhhorod	4	104	22	11	71	103	263	77	12th (1)	
19	Tavriya Simferopol	2	51	15	10	26	64	93	55	9th (1)	
20	Veres Rivne	1	26	14	6	6	49	32	48	4th (1)	
21	**FC Lviv**	1	26	9	4	13	30	50	31	10th (1)	
22	Zirka Kropyvnytskyi	2	52	6	9	37	30	124	27	14th (2)	
23	Kryvbas Kryvyi Rih	1	28	6	8	14	32	56	26	16th (1)	
24	FC Sevastopol	1	20	4	4	12	18	43	16	15th (1)	
25	**Desna Chernihiv**	1	26	1	0	25	16	124	3	14th (1)	

=== People of the Under-19 competitions ===
All-time Premier League appearance leaders
**Player**	**Games**	**Years**
(Ukraine) **Vitaliy Kholod**	78	2021–
(Ukraine) **Oleh Kryvoruchko**	75	2021–
(Ukraine) **Ivan Pakholyuk**	74	2021–
(Ukraine) **Artem Benedyuk**	73	2021–
(Ukraine) **Stanislav Prus**	73	2021–
Players **in bold** are still playing in Premier League; Data as of 7 January 2024

All-time Premier League scorers
**Player**	**Goals**	**Years**
(Ukraine) Vladyslav Vanat	36	2019–2021
(Ukraine) Yevhen Isayenko	34	2018–2019
(Armenia) Artur Miranyan	33	2013–2014
(Ukraine) Artem Dudik	32	2014–2016
(Ukraine) Mykhailo Plokhotnyuk	31	2016–2018
Players **in bold** are still playing in Premier League; Data as of 6 January 2024

All-time top-10 managers with league games
**Rank**	**Coach**	**Games**	**Clubs**	**Seasons**	
1	(Ukraine) **Ihor Kostyuk**	157	Dynamo Kyiv	2018	
2	(Ukraine) Vadym Mandriyevskyi	105	Vorskla Poltava	2015	2018
3	(Ukraine) Yuriy Dudnyk	103	Zorya Luhansk	2013	2016
4	(Ukraine) **Oleksandr Pozdeyev**	92	Kolos Kovalivka	2021	
5	(Ukraine) Oleh Kolobych	91	Veres Rivne → FC Lviv	2018	2021
5	(Ukraine) **Vasyl Baranov**	91	Zorya (50), Vorskla (41)	2017	
Coaches **in bold** are still active in the League; Data as of 10 January 2024

== See also ==
- Ukrainian Premier League
- Football in Ukraine
- Ukrainian football league system
