= 2007–08 Vyshcha Liha Reserves =

Ukrainian Premier League Reserves
- Season: 2007–08
- Champions: Dynamo Kyiv reserves
- Relegated: Naftovyk Okhtyrka Reserves, Zakarpattia Uzhhorod Reserves
- Top goalscorer: 18 – Oleksandr Aliev (Dynamo)

The 2007–08 Ukrainian Premier League Reserves and Under 19 season were competitions between the reserves of Ukrainian Premier League Clubs and the Under 19s.

The events in the senior leagues during the 2004–05 season saw Illichivets Mariupol Reserves and Stal Alchevsk Reserves be relegated with Naftovyk Okhtyrka Reserves and Zakarpattia Uzhhorod Reserves entering the competition.

== Current standings ==
Pos	Team	Pld	W	D	L	GF	GA	GD	Pts
1	Dynamo Kyiv reserves	30	26	3	1	87	29	+58	81
2	Metalurh Zaporizhzhia reserves	30	20	7	3	65	35	+30	67
3	Metalist Kharkiv reserves	30	18	5	7	65	34	+31	59
4	Shakhtar Donetsk reserves	30	18	4	8	76	40	+36	58
5	Metalurh Donetsk reserves	30	15	6	9	60	36	+24	51
6	Vorskla Poltava reserves	30	14	3	13	54	40	+14	45
7	Dnipro Dnipropetrovsk reserves	30	12	8	10	64	42	+22	44
8	Karpaty Lviv reserves	30	12	7	11	49	41	+8	43
9	Arsenal Kyiv reserves	30	12	2	16	34	44	−10	38
10	Zorya Luhansk reserves	30	11	5	14	38	50	−12	38
11	Naftovyk Okhtyrka reserves	30	10	6	14	38	46	−8	36
12	Chornomorets Odesa reserves	30	9	8	13	45	46	−1	35
13	Tavriya Simferopol reserves	30	7	6	17	25	60	−35	27
14	Kharkiv reserves	30	6	7	17	31	65	−34	25
15	Kryvbas Kryvyi Rih reserves	30	7	2	21	32	74	−42	23
16	Zakarpattia Uzhhorod reserves	30	1	5	24	7	98	−91	8

Source: FFU website (footpass) (in Ukrainian)
Rules for classification: 1) points; 2) goal difference; 3) number of goals scored. Relegation is dependent on senior club.

== Top scorers ==
Scorer	Goals (Pen.)	Team
(Ukraine) Oleksandr Aliev	18 (6)	Dynamo Kyiv Reserves
(Ukraine) Serhiy Pivnenko	11 (1)	Shakhtar Donetsk Reserves
(Ukraine) Yevhen Konoplyanka	11 (2)	Dnipro Dnipropetrovsk Reserves
(Ukraine) Ihor Tymchenko	11 (3)	Metalurh Donetsk Reserves
(Ukraine) Vitaliy Zherebtsov	10	Kharkiv Reserves
(Ukraine) Serhiy Davydov	10 (2)	Metalist Kharkiv Reserves
(Ukraine) Vasyl Kostyuk	8	Zorya Luhansk Reserves
(Ukraine) Andriy Yarmolenko	8	Dynamo Kyiv Reserves
(Ukraine) Yevhen Shakhov	8 (3)	Dnipro Dnipropetrovsk Reserves
(Ukraine) Vasyl Hrytsuk	8 (4)	Kryvbas Kryvyi Rih Reserves
(Ukraine) Vyacheslav Pidnebennoy	8 (5)	Shakhtar Donetsk Reserves

== See also ==
- 2007–08 Ukrainian Premier League
