= 2004–05 Vyshcha Liha Reserves =

Ukrainian Premier League Reserves
- Season: 2004–05
- Champions: FC Dynamo Kyiv reserves
- Runner up: FC Metalist Kharkiv reserves
- Relegated: FC Obolon Kyiv reserves FC Borysfen Boryspil reserves
- Top goalscorer: 9 – Roberto Nanni (Dynamo Reserves), Syarhei Karnilenka (Dynamo Reserves)

The 2004–05 Ukrainian Premier League Reserves season was an inaugural season of competition between reserve teams of Ukrainian Higher League clubs. The competition among reserve teams became the first official competition since fall of the Soviet Union and similar Soviet competitions in which Ukrainian clubs participated previously. The idea to revive such competitions was lingering for last couple of years (see, main article Ukrainian Premier League Reserves).

== Stadiums ==
The following stadiums were regarded as home grounds:

Rank	Stadium	Place	Club	Capacity	Notes
1	Chornomorets Tsentralnyi	Odesa	Chornomorets Odesa	34,164	
2	Shakhtar Tsentralnyi	Donetsk	Shakhtar Donetsk	31,718	
3	Vorskla	Poltava	Vorskla-Naftogaz	25,000	
4	KhTZ	Kharkiv	Metalist Kharkiv	15,000	
5	SKA	Odesa	Chornomorets Odesa	15,000	
6	Trudovi Rezervy	Bila Tserkva, Kyiv Oblast	Arsenal Kyiv	13,500	
7	CSK ZSU	Kyiv	Arsenal Kyiv	12,000	
8	ZAZ	Zaporizhia	Metalurh Zaporizhia	12,000	
9	Politekhnik	Kremenchuk, Poltava Oblast	Vorskla-Naftogaz	11,400	
10	Avanhard	Uzhhorod	Zakarpattia Uzhhorod	10,383	
11	Spartak	Brovary, Kyiv Oblast	Borysfen Boryspil	7,000	
12	Metalurh	Novomoskovsk, Dnipropetrovsk Oblast	Dnipro	6,000	
13	Spartak-ZIDMU (Lokomotyv)	Zaporizhia	Metalurh Zaporizhia	6,000	
14	Kolos	Boryspil, Kyiv Oblast	Borysfen Boryspil	5,654	
15	Avanhard	Makiivka, Donetsk Oblast	Shakhtar Donetsk	5,400	
16	Obolon	Kyiv	Obolon Kyiv	5,103	
17	Metalurh	Donetsk	Metalurh Donetsk	5,094	
18	Budivelnyk	Kryvyi Rih, Dnipropetrovsk Oblast	Kryvbas Kryvyi Rih	5,000	
19	Sevastopol SC	Sevastopol	Tavriya Simferopol	3,500	
20	KT Sport-Arena	Molodizhne, AR Crimea	Tavriya Simferopol	3,250	
21	Zhovtneva Mine	Kryvyi Rih, Dnipropetrovsk Oblast	Kryvbas Kryvyi Rih	3,219	
22	Avanhard	Dokuchayevsk, Donetsk Oblast	Metalurh Donetsk	3,000	some games
22	Avanhard	Dokuchayevsk, Donetsk Oblast	Shakhtar Donetsk	3,000	some games
23	Rayonyi Sports Complex	Obukhiv, Kyiv Oblast	Boryspil Borysfen	2,064	
24	Azovets	Mariupol, Donetsk Oblast	Illichivets Mariupol	1,660	
25	Dnister imeni Dukova	Ovidiopol, Odesa Oblast	Chornomorets Odesa	1,500	
26	Silmash	Kovel, Volyn Oblast	Volyn Lutsk	1,500	
27	Dynamo Training Center	Kyiv (Chapayivka)	Dynamo Kyiv	1,200	
27	Dynamo Training Center	Kyiv (Chapayivka)	Obolon Kyiv	1,200	some games
27	Dynamo Training Center	Kyiv (Chapayivka)	Arsenal Kyiv	1,200	some games
27	Dynamo Training Center	Kyiv (Chapayivka)	Borysfen Boryspil	1,200	some games
28	Yuvileinyi	Bucha, Kyiv Oblast	Obolon Kyiv	1,028	
29	Horodskoyi shkoly	Shchaslyve, Kyiv Oblast	Borysfen Boryspil	1,000	
30	Metalist training base	Kharkiv (Vysokyi)	Metalist Kharkiv	1,000	
31	Perechyn (Khimik)	Perechyn, Zakarpattia Oblast	Zakarpattia Uzhhorod	1,000	
32	Druzhba	Berehovo, Zakarpattia Oblast	Zakarpattia Uzhhorod	900	
33	Metalurh training base	Zaporizhia (Velykyi Luh)	Metalurh Zaporizhia	500	
34	Dynamo Training Center (artificial turf)	Kyiv (Chapayivka)	Obolon Kyiv		

== Managers ==
Club	Coach	Replaced coach
FC Arsenal Kyiv		
FC Chornomorets Odesa	(Ukraine) Vladyslav Zubkov	(Ukraine) Oleksandr Skrypnyk
FC Dnipro Dnipropetrovsk	(Ukraine) Volodymyr Horilyi	
FC Dynamo Kyiv		
FC Volyn Lutsk		
FC Borysfen Boryspil		
FC Kryvbas Kryvyi Rih	(Ukraine) Andriy Kuptsov	(Ukraine) Volodymyr Sharan
FC Metalist Kharkiv	(Ukraine) Ihor Korniyets	
FC Metalurh Donetsk	(Ukraine) Serhiy Yashchenko	
FC Metalurh Zaporizhya		
FC Illichivets Mariupol		
FC Shakhtar Donetsk	(Ukraine) Valeriy Rudakov	
SC Tavriya Simferopol		
FC Vorskla Poltava		
FC Obolon Kyiv	(Ukraine) Viktor Kontsurak	
FC Zakarpattia Uzhhorod		

== Final standings ==
Pos	Team	Pld	W	D	L	GF	GA	GD	Pts
1	Dynamo Kyiv reserves (C)	30	22	5	3	77	24	+53	71
2	Metalist Kharkiv reserves	30	18	4	8	48	31	+17	58
3	Illichivets Mariupol reserves	30	17	6	7	55	31	+24	57
4	Vorskla-Naftogaz Poltava reserves	30	16	4	10	40	26	+14	52
5	Metalurh Zaporizhya reserves	30	13	10	7	43	29	+14	49
6	Metalurh Donetsk reserves	30	13	5	12	41	34	+7	44
7	Dnipro Dnipropetrovsk reserves	30	12	7	11	46	42	+4	43
8	Chornomorets Odesa reserves	30	12	6	12	44	36	+8	42
9	Volyn Lutsk reserves	30	11	8	11	45	50	−5	41
10	Kryvbas Kryvyi Rih reserves	30	11	6	13	37	39	−2	39
11	Tavriya Simferopol reserves	30	10	5	15	31	42	−11	35
12	Obolon Kyiv reserves (R)	30	10	5	15	30	50	−20	35
13	Shakhtar Donetsk reserves	30	9	4	17	33	58	−25	31
14	Borysfen Boryspil reserves (R)	30	7	9	14	29	41	−12	30
15	Zakarpattia Uzhhorod reserves	30	7	6	17	24	55	−31	27
16	Arsenal Kyiv reserves	30	6	2	22	22	57	−35	20

Source: Premier League Reserves website (in Ukrainian)
Rules for classification: 1) points; 2) goal difference; 3) number of goals scored. Relegation is dependent on senior club.
(C) Champions; (R) Relegated

== Top scorers ==
Scorer	Goals	Team
(Argentina) Roberto Nanni	9	Dynamo Reserves
(Belarus) Syarhei Karnilenka	9 (2)	Dynamo Reserves
(Ukraine) Dmytro Brovkin	8 (1)	Obolon Reserves
(Ukraine) Oleksandr Zghura	8 (3)	Chornomorets Reserves
(Ukraine) Artem Mostovyi	7	Arsenal Kyiv Reserves
(Lithuania) Edgaras Česnauskis	6	Dynamo Kyiv Reserves
(Moldova) Vadym Kyrylov	6	Metalurh Zaporizhia Reserves
(Russia) Sergei Kosilov	6	Dnipro Dnipropetrovsk Reserves
(Ukraine) Andriy Solovyov	6	Metalurh Donetsk Reserves
(Bulgaria) Georgi Peev	6 (2)	Dynamo Kyiv Reserves
(Ukraine) Oleksandr Antonenko	6 (3)	Illichivets Mariupol Reserves

== See also ==
- 2004–05 Ukrainian Premier League
