= 2016–17 Ukrainian Premier League Under-21 and Under-19 =

Ukrainian Premier League Reserves
- Season: 2016–17
- Top goalscorer: 16 – Boryachuk (Shakhtar)

The 2016–17 Ukrainian Premier League Reserves and Under 19 season were competitions between the reserves of Ukrainian Premier League Clubs and the Under 19s.

The events in the senior leagues during the 2015–16 season saw Metalurh Zaporizhia Reserves, Hoverla Uzhhorod Reserves, and Metalist Kharkiv Reserves be dissolved with Zirka Kropyvnytskyi Reserves entering the competition.

== Standings ==
Pos	Team	Pld	W	D	L	GF	GA	GD	Pts
1	Dynamo Kyiv reserves	32	26	3	3	76	19	+57	81
2	Shakhtar Donetsk reserves	32	24	4	4	74	15	+59	76
3	Karpaty Lviv reserves	32	17	6	9	45	35	+10	57
4	Olimpik Donetsk reserves	32	13	9	10	51	55	−4	48
5	Zorya Luhansk reserves	32	11	3	18	33	47	−14	36
6	Chornomorets Odesa reserves	32	8	8	16	34	45	−11	32
7	Stal Kamianske reserves	32	12	11	9	55	51	+4	47
8	Vorskla Poltava reserves	32	11	11	10	41	35	+6	44
9	Dnipro reserves	32	11	8	13	57	46	+11	41
10	Oleksandriya reserves	32	6	13	13	28	42	−14	31
11	Volyn Lutsk reserves	32	6	3	23	35	102	−67	21
12	Zirka Kropyvnytskyi reserves	32	3	9	20	24	61	−37	18

Source: Ukrainian Premier League website (in Ukrainian)
Rules for classification: 1) points; 2) goal difference; 3) number of goals scored. Relegation is dependent on senior club

== Top scorers ==
Scorer	Goals (Pen.)	Team
(Ukraine) Stanislav Bilenkyi	16 (8)	Olimpik Donetsk Reserves
(Georgia (country)) Giorgi Arabidze	15 (4)	Shakhtar Donetsk Reserves
(Ukraine) Serhiy Myakushko	13 (1)	Dynamo Kyiv Reserves
(Ukraine) Oleksiy Shchebetun	11 (1)	Stal Kamianske Reserves
(Ukraine) Mykyta Adamenko	10	Shakhtar Donetsk Reserves
(Ukraine) Andriy Boryachuk	9	Shakhtar Donetsk Reserves
(Ukraine) Yuriy Klymchuk	9 (1)	Stal Kamianske Reserves
(Ukraine) Orest Kuzyk	7 (2)	Stal Kamianske Reserves

== See also ==
- 2016–17 Ukrainian Premier League
