= FC Shakhtar Donetsk junior squads and academy =

Shakhtar Donetsk juniors
- Full name: Youth team of FC Shakhtar Donetsk (U21/U19)
- Ground: Knyazha Arena, Shchaslyve, Ukraine
- Capacity: 1,000
- President: Rinat Akhmetov
- League: Youth Championship
- Website: https://shakhtar.com/en/club/academy/

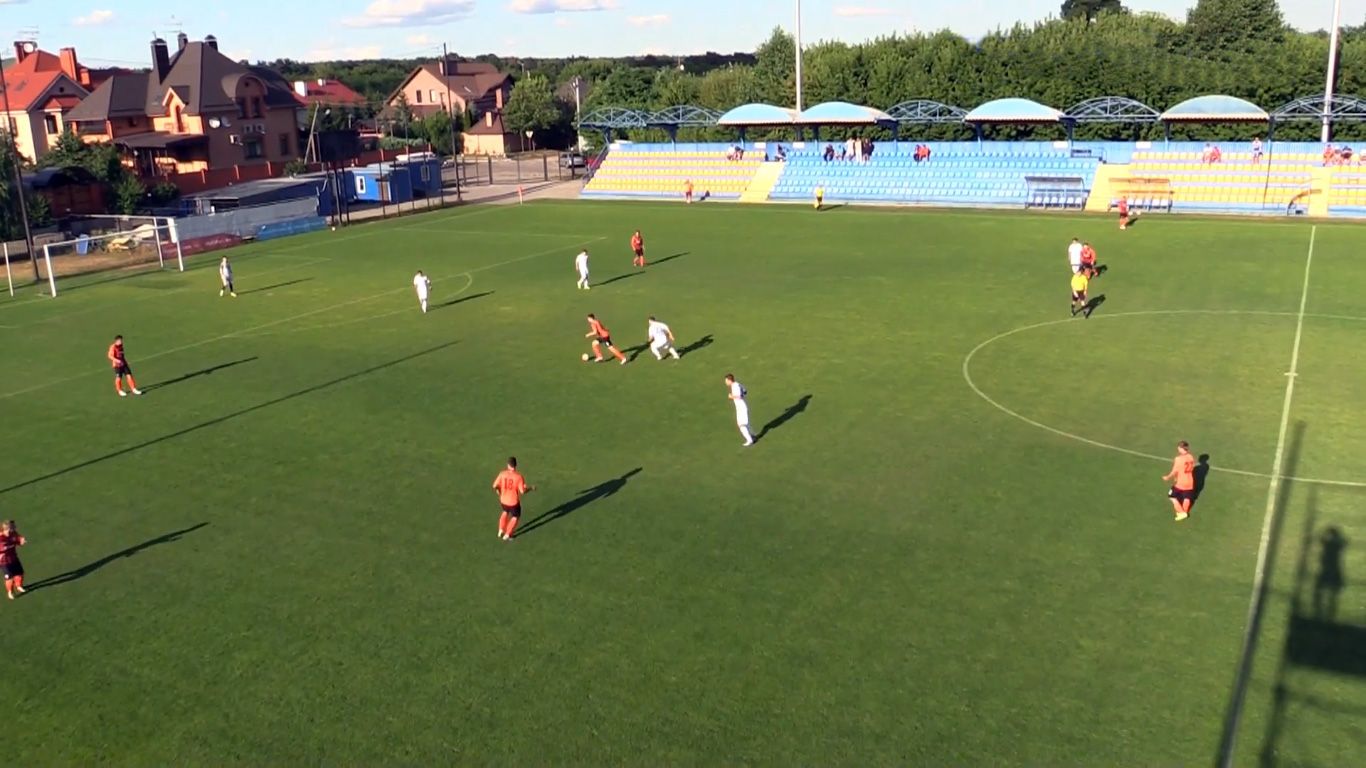
Knyazha Arena in 2016 (Shakhtar - Olimpik) under-21

The FC Shakhtar Donetsk junior squads and academy is a football academy and the club's junior squads of Ukrainian professional football club Shakhtar Donetsk.

Shakhtar Donetsk has two junior teams (squads) that participate in the junior championships of the Ukrainian Premier League. There also were some additional reserve teams that competed in lower leagues (Shakhtar-2 and Shakhtar-3). Four more teams from the club's academy participate in the Ukrainian Youth Football League which is a separate national football league not associated with the Ukrainian Premier League designed for football academy and sports schools.

== Brief history ==
FC Shakhtar Donetsk has been fielding its reserve (junior) team since 1949 when the club returned to the Soviet top league (Pervaya Gruppa). In 1953 the club established its own training center in Kirsha. Since discontinuation of the Soviet Top League in 1991, Shakhtar reserve team was discontinued as well.

In 1992 based on reserve team there was created FC Shakhtar-2 Donetsk which was based in Kostiantynivka and entered competitions among professional teams the 1992 Ukrainian First League.

At the end of 1990s there were more discussions about revival of junior competitions. In 1998 there was created All-Ukrainian youth football championship among senior and junior youth teams and which in 2000 Shakhtar junior youth team won. In 2001 there was established the DYuFL (Youth Football League) and teams of Vyshcha Liha (Higher League) were mandated to field four teams in each age group competition (U-14, U-15, U-16, U-17). In 2002 there also was established provisional competitions among under-19 teams.

== Honours ==
- UEFA Youth League (Under-19)
  - Runners-up (1): 2014–15
- Soviet Top League (reserves)
  - Winners (2): 1967, 1969
  - Runners-up (3): 1968, 1976, 1977
- Ukrainian Under-21 Championship
  - Winners (4): 2008–09, 2010–11, 2011–12, 2017–18
  - Runners-up (5): 2006–07, 2009–10, 2013–14, 2015–16, 2016–17
- Ukrainian Under-19 Championship
  - Winners (2): 2014–15, 2020–21
  - Runners-up (2): 2013–14, 2017–18
- Ukrainian Under-17 Championship
  - Winners (7): 2002–03, 2003–04, 2007–08, 2010–11, 2011–12, 2012–13, 2017–18
  - Runners-up (2): 2004–05, 2009–10

== Current squad ==
As of 1 September 2023.

Note: Flags indicate national team as defined under FIFA eligibility rules; some limited exceptions apply. Players may hold more than one non-FIFA nationality.

| No. | Pos. | Nation | Player |
|---|---|---|---|
| — | GK | UKR | Rostyslav Bahlay |
| — | GK | UKR | Denys Barchenko |
| — | GK | UKR | Marko Kessel |
| — | GK | UKR | Vladyslav Kravets |
| — | GK | UKR | Artem Nedozymovanyi |
| — | GK | UKR | Radislav Tanashchuk |
| — | DF | UKR | Maryan Bats |
| — | DF | UKR | Oleksandr Bashmarin |
| — | DF | UKR | Dmytro Bezkleynyi |
| — | DF | UKR | Oleh Chuyko |
| — | DF | UKR | Maksym Danylyuk |
| — | DF | UKR | Yehor Dankovskyi |
| — | DF | UKR | Anton Drozd |
| — | DF | UKR | Valentyn Halonskyi |
| — | DF | UKR | Yehor Kostyuk |
| — | DF | UKR | Mykola Oharkov |
| — | DF | UKR | Mykyta Sheleketa |
| — | MF | UKR | Kristian Bako |
| — | MF | UKR | Vasyl Bundash |
| — | MF | SEN | Ibrahima Dabo |
| — | MF | UKR | Maksym Honchar |

| No. | Pos. | Nation | Player |
|---|---|---|---|
| — | MF | UKR | Mykhaylo Khromey |
| — | MF | UKR | Oleksandr Kostrytsya |
| — | MF | UKR | Ivan Losenko |
| — | MF | UKR | Vladyslav Naumenko |
| — | MF | UKR | Yevheniy Prokopenko |
| — | MF | UKR | Oleksandr Rozputko |
| — | MF | UKR | Denys Smetana |
| — | MF | UKR | Bohdan Tryfanenko |
| — | MF | UKR | Viktor Tsukanov |
| — | MF | UKR | Vladyslav Tyutyunov |
| — | MF | UKR | Yevhen Yanovych |
| — | FW | UKR | Anton Demchenko |
| — | FW | UKR | Daniil Holovachov |
| — | FW | UKR | Yehor Knyazyev |
| — | FW | UKR | Oleksandr Lomaha |
| — | FW | UKR | Vitaliy Myts |
| — | FW | UKR | Oleh Pushkariov |
| — | FW | UKR | Daniil Savin |
| — | FW | UKR | Yehor Shakun |
| — | FW | UKR | Oleksandr Yushchenko |

== International competitions ==
Since 2013, Shakhtar's junior team competed at the UEFA Youth League. Shakhtar became the first Ukrainian team to enter the competition. The first game was played on 17 September 2013 at the Zubieta Facilities against Real Sociedad Juvenil. The first goal for Shakhtar in the competition was scored by Ukrainian international footballer Artur Miranyan, who later switched to play for Armenia.

In 2015, Shakhtar's juniors reached the UEFA Youth League finals, but lost it.

=== UEFA Youth League ===
As of match played 10 December 2025

| Season | Round | Opponent | Home | Away | Aggregate |
|---|---|---|---|---|---|
| 2013–14 | GS | (Spain) Real Sociedad | 0–0 | 2–3 | Second place |
| 2013–14 | GS | (England) Manchester United | 2–1 | 1–1 | Second place |
| 2013–14 | GS | (Germany) Bayer Leverkusen | 2–2 | 2–1 | Second place |
| 2013–14 | R16 | (England) Arsenal | — | 1–3 | 1–3 |
| 2014–15 | GS | (Spain) Athletic Bilbao | 6–0 | 2–0 | First place |
| 2014–15 | GS | (Portugal) Porto | 1–1 | 1–1 | First place |
| 2014–15 | GS | (Belarus) BATE Borisov | 1–0 | 4–1 | First place |
| 2014–15 | R16 | (Greece) Olympiacos | 1–1 (aet) (5–4 p) | — | 1–1 (aet) (5–4 p) |
| 2014–15 | QF | (Portugal) Benfica | — | 1–1 (aet) (5–4 p) | 1–1 (aet) (5–4 p) |
| 2014–15 | SF | (Belgium) Anderlecht | 3–1 | | 3–1 |
| 2014–15 | F | (England) Chelsea | 2–3 | | 2–3 |
| 2015–16 | GS | (Spain) Real Madrid | 2–6 | 0–4 | Forth place |
| 2015–16 | GS | (France) Paris Saint-Germain | 1–4 | 2–5 | Forth place |
| 2015–16 | GS | (Sweden) Malmö FF | 3–1 | 5–5 | Forth place |
| 2017–18 | GS | (Italy) Napoli | 1–2 | 1–2 | Third place |
| 2017–18 | GS | (England) Manchester City | 2–1 | 1–3 | Third place |
| 2017–18 | GS | (Netherlands) Feyenoord | 1–1 | 0–4 | Third place |
| 2018–19 | GS | (Germany) TSG Hoffenheim | 1–2 | 1–1 | Forth place |
| 2018–19 | GS | (France) Lyon | 1–1 | 0–2 | Forth place |
| 2018–19 | GS | (England) Manchester City | 1–1 | 1–4 | Forth place |
| 2019–20 | GS | (England) Manchester City | 1–3 | 0–5 | Forth place |
| 2019–20 | GS | (Italy) Atalanta | 1–4 | 2–2 | Forth place |
| 2019–20 | GS | (Croatia) Dinamo Zagreb | 1–1 | 0–1 | Forth place |
| 2020–21 | Cancelled due to the COVID-19 pandemic in Europe | | | | |
| 2021–22 | GS | (Moldova) Sheriff Tiraspol | 6–0 | 5–0 | Third place |
| 2021–22 | GS | (Italy) Inter Milan | 0–1 | 0–1 | Third place |
| 2021–22 | GS | (Spain) Real Madrid | 3–2 | 0–1 | Third place |
| 2022–23 | GS | (Germany) RB Leipzig | 1–1 | 2–0 | Second place |
| 2022–23 | GS | (Scotland) Celtic | 2–1 | 1–0 | Second place |
| 2022–23 | GS | (Spain) Real Madrid | 0–3 | 1–6 | Second place |
| 2022–23 | R32 | (Croatia) Hajduk Split | — | 0–1 | 0–1 |
| 2023–24 | GS | (Portuguese Football Federation) Porto | 1–4 | 0–2 | Third place |
| 2023–24 | GS | (Royal Belgian Football Association) Antwerp | 3–1 | 2–1 | Third place |
| 2023–24 | GS | (Royal Spanish Football Federation) Barcelona | 0–3 | 0–2 | Third place |
| 2024–25 | LP | (Italy) Bologna | — | 4–3 | 14th place |
| 2024–25 | LP | (Italy) Atalanta | 0–3 | — | 14th place |
| 2024–25 | LP | (England) Arsenal | — | 1–0 | 14th place |
| 2024–25 | LP | (Switzerland) Young Boys | 1–0 | — | 14th place |
| 2024–25 | LP | (Netherlands) PSV Eindhoven | — | 1–1 | 14th place |
| 2024–25 | LP | (Germany) Bayern Munich | 0–2 | — | 14th place |
| 2024–25 | R32 | (Germany) TSG Hoffenheim | — | 1–5 | 1–5 |

== League and cup history ==
=== Shakhtar U-21 / doubles ===
| Season | Div. | Pos. | Pl. | W | D | L | GS | GA | P | Cup | Europe | Notes |
|---|---|---|---|---|---|---|---|---|---|---|---|---|
| 2004–05 | 1st | 13 | 30 | 9 | 4 | 17 | 33 | 58 | 31 | | | |
| 2005–06 | 1st | 16 | 30 | 5 | 4 | 21 | 42 | 78 | 19 | | | |
| 2006–07 | 1st | 2 | 30 | 20 | 5 | 5 | 74 | 37 | 65 | | | |
| 2007–08 | 1st | 4 | 30 | 18 | 4 | 8 | 76 | 40 | 58 | | | |
| 2008–09 | 1st | 1 | 30 | 23 | 5 | 2 | 70 | 18 | 74 | | | |
| 2009–10 | 1st | 2 | 30 | 18 | 7 | 5 | 74 | 34 | 61 | | | |
| 2010–11 | 1st | 1 | 30 | 22 | 3 | 5 | 66 | 30 | 69 | | | |
| 2011–12 | 1st | 1 | 30 | 21 | 8 | 1 | 78 | 29 | 71 | | | |
| 2012–13 | 1st | 3 | 30 | 16 | 5 | 9 | 67 | 38 | 53 | | | |
| 2013–14 | 1st | 2 | 26 | 16 | 7 | 3 | 70 | 31 | 55 | | | |
| 2014–15 | 1st | 4 | 26 | 14 | 5 | 7 | 63 | 31 | 47 | | | |
| 2015–16 | 1st | 2 | 26 | 19 | 3 | 4 | 53 | 25 | 60 | | | |
| 2016–17 | 1st | 2 | 32 | 24 | 4 | 4 | 74 | 15 | 76 | | | |
| 2017–18 | 1st | 1 | 32 | 19 | 7 | 6 | 68 | 21 | 64 | | | |

=== Shakhtar U-19 ===
| Season | Div. | Pos. | Pl. | W | D | L | GS | GA | P | Cup | Europe | Notes |
|---|---|---|---|---|---|---|---|---|---|---|---|---|
| 2012–13 | 1st (East) | 2 | 14 | 7 | 2 | 5 | 26 | 17 | 23 | | | to Champ |
| 2012–13 | 1st (Champ) | 3 | 14 | 7 | 3 | 4 | 30 | 15 | 24 | | | |
| 2013–14 | 1st (East) | 1 | 14 | 13 | 1 | 0 | 54 | 9 | 40 | | | to Champ |
| 2013–14 | 1st (Champ) | 2 | 12 | 7 | 3 | 2 | 26 | 10 | 24 | | | |
| 2014–15 | 1st (Donbas) | 1 | 12 | 9 | 1 | 2 | 31 | 14 | 28 | | | to Champ |
| 2014–15 | 1st (Champ) | 1 | 14 | 11 | 2 | 1 | 39 | 14 | 35 | | | |
| 2015–16 | 1st | 3 | 30 | 19 | 5 | 6 | 67 | 30 | 62 | | | |
| 2016–17 | 1st | 3 | 26 | 15 | 5 | 6 | 56 | 28 | 50 | | | |
| 2017–18 | 1st | 2 | 26 | 18 | 2 | 6 | 74 | 26 | 56 | | | |
| 2018–19 | 1st | | | | | | | | | | | |

== Notable players ==
- Vladyslav Kulach
- Artur Miranyan
- Artur Zahorulko

== See also ==
- Kirsha Training Centre
- FC Shakhtar-2 Donetsk
