= 2020–21 Ukrainian Premier League Under-21 and Under-19 =

Ukrainian Premier League Under-21 and Under-19
- Season: 2020–21
- Top goalscorer: 26 – Vladyslav Vanat (Dynamo)

The 2020–21 Ukrainian Premier League Under-21 and Under-19 season were competitions between the youth teams of the Ukrainian Premier League. The competitions among under-21 teams were expanded due to expansion of the league as well as sanctions against Olimpik had expired. Also, Karpaty Lviv were expelled from the Ukrainian Premier League for no show in the previous season.

During the winter break, it was decided that for competitions among "under-21" teams this was the last season and all participating teams of clubs were given chance to be converted to their clubs' second teams (reserve teams) playing in the football pyramid, predominantly the Second League. The top three were granted with possibility to enter competition of the Ukrainian First League, however, it was subject to be approved in the next season regulations in 2021 summer.

== Teams ==
Entering	Replaced
Mynai; Rukh Lviv; Inhulets Petrove; Olimpik Donetsk	Karpaty Lviv

== Under-21 competition ==
=== Standings ===
Pos	Team	Pld	W	D	L	GF	GA	GD	Pts	Qualification or relegation
1	FC Dynamo Kyiv U-21	26	22	3	1	96	20	+76	69	Champion
2	FC Shakhtar Donetsk U-21	26	20	2	4	73	22	+51	62	Runner-up
3	FC Rukh Lviv U-21	26	15	7	4	60	30	+30	52	
4	FC Oleksandriya U-21	26	15	5	6	58	31	+27	50	
5	FC Vorskla Poltava U-21	26	13	4	9	56	39	+17	43	
6	SC Dnipro-1 U-21	26	12	6	8	54	43	+11	42	
7	FC Kolos Kovalivka U-21	26	12	4	10	62	47	+15	40	
8	FC Mariupol U-21	26	11	6	9	47	42	+5	39	
9	FC Zorya Luhansk U-21	26	10	4	12	50	53	−3	34	
10	FC Lviv U-21	26	8	3	15	45	49	−4	27	
11	FC Mynai U-21	26	5	4	17	21	60	−39	19	
12	FC Olimpik Donetsk U-21	26	4	4	18	21	77	−56	16	Relegated
13	FC Desna Chernihiv U-21	26	3	5	18	23	76	−53	14	
14	FC Inhulets Petrove U-21	26	3	1	22	18	95	−77	10	

Source: Ukrainian Premier League website
Rules for classification: 1) points; 2) goal difference; 3) number of goals scored. Relegation is dependent on senior club

=== Top scorers ===
Scorer	Team	Goals (Pen.)
(Ukraine) Vladyslav Vanat	Dynamo Kyiv U-21	26 (5)
(Ukraine) Anton Baidal	Mariupol U-21	17 (5)
(Ukraine) Vikentiy Voloshyn	Dynamo Kyiv U-21	15
(Ukraine) Bohdan Viunnyk	Shakhtar Donetsk U-21	15 (3)
(Ukraine) Yaroslav Nadolskyi	Dynamo Kyiv U-21	13

Source: Ukrainian Premier League website

== Under-19 competition ==
Pos	Team	Pld	W	D	L	GF	GA	GD	Pts	Qualification or relegation
1	FC Shakhtar Donetsk U-19	26	19	5	2	55	10	+45	62	Qualification to UEFA Champions League Path
2	FC Dynamo Kyiv U-19	26	20	2	4	70	18	+52	62	Qualification to UEFA Champions League Path
3	FC Zorya Luhansk U-19	26	16	5	5	47	28	+19	53	
4	FC Rukh Lviv U-19	26	13	7	6	49	25	+24	46	
5	FC Vorskla Poltava U-19	26	13	5	8	50	28	+22	44	
6	FC Kolos Kovalivka U-19	26	11	6	9	30	38	−8	39	
7	FC Oleksandriya U-19	26	11	5	10	29	37	−8	38	
8	FC Lviv U-19	26	9	8	9	34	32	+2	35	
9	FC Mariupol U-19	26	8	7	11	29	39	−10	31	
10	SC Dnipro-1 U-19	26	8	4	14	34	38	−4	28	
11	FC Inhulets Petrove U-19	26	7	5	14	27	51	−24	26	
12	FC Olimpik Donetsk U-19	26	5	7	14	32	54	−22	22	Relegated
13	FC Desna Chernihiv U-19	26	1	8	17	15	61	−46	11	
14	FC Mynai U-19	26	2	4	20	13	55	−42	10	

Source: Ukrainian Premier League website
Rules for classification: 1) points; 2) goal difference; 3) number of goals scored. Relegation is dependent on senior club

=== Top scorers ===
Scorer	Goals (Pen.)	Team
(Ukraine) Kiril Popov	19 (1)	Dynamo Kyiv U-19
(Ukraine) Leon Hladkovskyi	12 (2)	Vorskla Poltava U-19
(Ukraine) Artem Liehostayev	10 (1)	Zorya Luhansk U-19
(Ukraine) Artur Mykytyshyn	9	Shakhtar Donetsk U-19
(Ukraine) Ruslan Nepeypiyev	9	Rukh Lviv U-19

Source: Ukrainian Premier League website

== See also ==
- 2020–21 Ukrainian Premier League
