= 2006–07 Vyshcha Liha Reserves =

Ukrainian Premier League Reserves
- Season: 2006–07
- Champions: Dynamo Kyiv reserves
- Relegated: Stal Alchevsk Reserves, Illichivsk Mariupol Reserves
- Top goalscorer: 21 – Oleksandr Aliev (Dynamo)

The 2006–07 Ukrainian Premier League Reserves and Under 19 season were competitions between the reserves of Ukrainian Premier League Clubs and the Under 19s.

The events in the senior leagues during the 2004–05 season saw Volyn Lutsk Reserves and Zakarpattia Uzhhorod Reserves be relegated with Zorya Luhansk Reserves and Karpaty Lviv Reserves entering the competition.

== Current standings ==
Pos	Team	Pld	W	D	L	GF	GA	GD	Pts
1	Dynamo Kyiv reserves	30	21	7	2	86	24	+62	70
2	Shakhtar Donetsk reserves	30	20	5	5	74	37	+37	65
3	Chornomorets Odesa reserves	30	19	4	7	46	27	+19	61
4	Illichivsk Mariupol reserves	30	18	6	6	63	27	+36	60
5	Dnipro Dnipropetrovsk reserves	30	16	8	6	56	32	+24	56
6	Kharkiv reserves	30	12	7	11	47	46	+1	43
7	Vorskla Poltava reserves	30	12	6	12	37	33	+4	42
8	Karpaty Lviv reserves	30	11	6	13	48	46	+2	39
9	Metalurh Zaporizhzhia reserves	30	10	9	11	37	37	0	39
10	Metalist Kharkiv reserves	30	12	5	13	34	56	−22	41
11	Stal Alchevsk reserves	30	9	8	13	33	50	−17	35
12	Kryvbas Kryvyi Rih reserves	30	9	5	16	31	54	−23	32
13	Tavriya Simferopol reserves	30	7	4	19	27	76	−49	25
14	Arsenal Kyiv reserves	30	4	10	16	19	50	−31	22
15	Metalurh Donetsk reserves	30	4	8	18	30	46	−16	20
16	Zorya Luhansk reserves	30	4	8	18	24	51	−27	20

Source: FFU website (footpass) (in Ukrainian)
Rules for classification: 1) points; 2) goal difference; 3) number of goals scored. Relegation is dependent on senior club.

== Top scorers ==
Scorer	Goals (Pen.)	Team
(Ukraine) Oleksandr Aliev	21 (4)	Dynamo Kyiv Reserves
(Ukraine) Serhiy Shevchuk	20 (4)	Shakhtar Donetsk Reserves
(Ukraine) Yevhen Seleznyov	15	Shakhtar Donetsk Reserves
(Ukraine) Dmytro Lyopa	15 (5)	Dnipro Dnipropetrovsk Reserves
(Ukraine) Oleksandr Antonenko	11 (3)	Illichivets Mariupol Reserves
(Ukraine) Serhiy Motuz	8	Dnipro Dnipropetrovsk Reserves
(Ukraine) Serhiy Davydov	8 (1)	Metalist Kharkiv Reserves
(Ukraine) Denys Oliynyk	8 (1)	Dynamo Kyiv Reserves
(Ukraine) Vladyslav Holopyorov	8 (2)	Shakhtar Donetsk Reserves
(Ukraine) Oleksandr Zghura	8 (5)	Chornomorets Odesa Reserves

== See also ==
- 2006–07 Ukrainian Premier League
