= Vladyslav Khomutov =

Ukrainian footballer

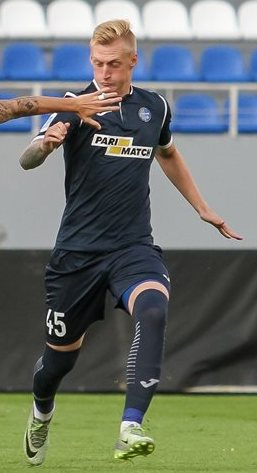

Personal information
- Full name: Vladyslav Denysovych Khomutov
- Date of birth: 4 June 1998 (age 28)
- Place of birth: Donetsk, Ukraine
- Height: 1.83 m (6 ft 0 in)
- Position: Midfielder

Team information
- Current team: Dukagjini
- Number: 11

Youth career
- 2011–2012: Shakhtar Donetsk
- 2012–2014: Olimpik Donetsk

Senior career*
Years	Team	Apps	(Gls)
2014–2018	Olimpik Donetsk	34	(1)
2018	Chornomorets Odesa	0	(0)
2019	ViOn Zlaté Moravce	3	(0)
2019–2021	Nõmme Kalju	55	(20)
2022	Šamorín	9	(1)
2022–2023	Dukagjini	22	(2)
2023–2024	Gagra	8	(1)
2024	West Armenia	9	(0)
2024–	Dukagjini	15	(0)
- * Club domestic league appearances and goals as of 26 June 2025

Vladyslav Khomutov (Ukrainian: Владислав Денисович Хомутов; born 4 June 1998) is a Ukrainian professional footballer who plays as a midfielder for Dukagjini in Kosovo.

== Career ==
Khomutov is a product of FC Olimpik Donetsk and FC Shakhtar Donetsk Youth Sportive School Systems.

In 2014, he signed a contract with Olimpik Donetsk, and played in the reserves. Khomutov made his debut playing as a substitute in the main-squad team in the match against Dnipro Dnipropetrovsk on 15 May 2016 in the Ukrainian Premier League.

== Personal life ==
His father Denys Khomutov is also a retired football player and current manager.

== Honours ==
Nõmme Kalju

- Estonian Supercup: 2019

Individual

- Top scorer: 2015–16 Ukrainian Premier League U-19 competitions
