= 2005–06 Vyshcha Liha Reserves =

Ukrainian Premier League Reserves
- Season: 2005–06
- Champions: Dynamo Kyiv reserves
- Relegated: Volyn Lutsk Reserves, Zakarpattia Uzhhorod Reserves
- Top goalscorer: 21 – Serhiy Davydov (Metalist)

The 2005–06 Ukrainian Premier League Reserves and Under 19 season were competitions between the reserves of Ukrainian Premier League Clubs and the Under 19s.

The events in the senior leagues during the 2004–05 season saw Borysfen Boryspil Reserves and Obolon Kyiv Reserves be relegated with Stal Alchevsk Reserves and Kharkiv Reserves entering the competition.

== Current standings ==
Pos	Team	Pld	W	D	L	GF	GA	GD	Pts
1	Dynamo Kyiv reserves	30	24	3	3	83	31	+52	75
2	Metalist Kharkiv reserves	30	18	5	7	58	29	+29	59
3	Mariupol reserves	30	17	8	5	59	39	+20	59
4	Dnipro Dnipropetrovsk reserves	30	15	6	9	54	38	+16	51
5	Metalurh Zaporizhzhia reserves	30	15	6	9	56	43	+13	51
6	Vorskla Poltava reserves	30	15	4	11	43	39	+4	49
7	Kharkiv reserves	30	14	3	13	49	45	+4	45
8	Chornomorets Odesa reserves	30	14	3	13	51	49	+2	45
9	Arsenal Kyiv reserves	30	12	8	10	41	35	+6	44
10	Tavriya Simferopol reserves	30	10	6	14	60	59	+1	36
11	Kryvbas Kryvyi Rih reserves	30	10	5	15	39	51	−12	35
12	Metalurh Donetsk reserves	30	9	5	16	39	56	−17	32
13	Volyn Lutsk reserves	30	9	3	18	48	79	−31	30
14	Stal Alchevsk reserves	30	8	3	19	39	56	−17	27
15	Zakarpattia Uzhhorod reserves	30	7	4	19	26	60	−34	25
16	Shakhtar Donetsk reserves	30	5	4	21	42	78	−36	19

Source: Ukrainian Premier League website (in Ukrainian)
Rules for classification: 1) points; 2) goal difference; 3) number of goals scored. Relegation is dependent on senior club.

== Top scorers ==
Scorer	Goals (Pen.)	Team
(Ukraine) Serhiy Davydov	21 (6)	Metalist Kharkiv Reserves
(Ukraine) Oleksandr Antonenko	20 (7)	Illichivets Mariupol Reserves
(Nigeria) Michael Chidi Alozie	16 (3)	Volyn Lutsk Reserves
(Ukraine) Oleksandr Aliev	14 (1)	Dynamo Kyiv Reserves
(Ukraine) Oleksandr Akymenko	12	Stal Alchevsk Reserves
(Ukraine) Oleksandr Batalskyi	11	Arsenal Kyiv Reserves
(Ukraine) Andriy Kruhlyak	11 (1)	Metalurh Zaporizhzhia Reserves
(Ukraine) Ruslan Ivashko	10	Tavriya Simferopol Reserves
(Ukraine) Oleksandr Zghura	10 (3)	Chornomorets Odesa Reserves

== See also ==
- 2005–06 Ukrainian Premier League
