= Stanislav Bilenkyi =

Ukrainian footballer

Stanislav Bilenkyi Станіслав Біленький
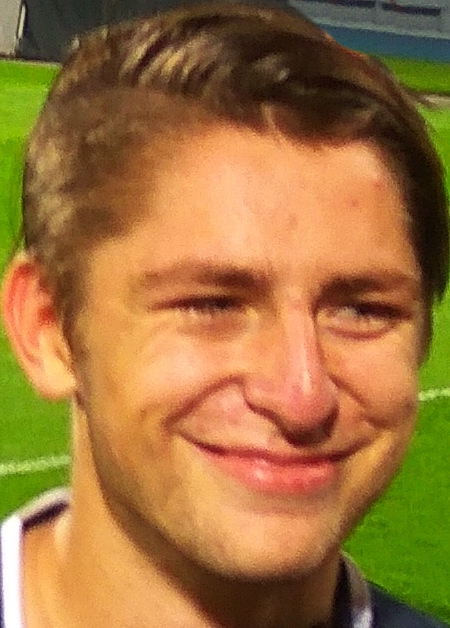
- Bilenkyi in 2017

Personal information
- Full name: Stanislav Serhiyovych Bilenkyi
- Date of birth: 22 August 1998 (age 28)
- Place of birth: Donetsk, Ukraine
- Height: 1.82 m (6 ft 0 in)
- Position: Forward

Team information
- Current team: Žalgiris
- Number: 19

Youth career
- 2010–2011: Shakhtar Donetsk
- 2012–2014: Olimpik Donetsk

Senior career*
Years	Team	Apps	(Gls)
2014–2018	Olimpik Donetsk	34	(6)
2018–2021	DAC Dunajská Streda	8	(1)
2019	→ Zagłębie Sosnowiec (loan)	18	(2)
2020	→ Rukh Lviv (loan)	5	(0)
2021	→ Dynamo Brest (loan)	27	(13)
2022	Dinamo Tbilisi	29	(10)
2023–2024	Maccabi Netanya	38	(3)
2024–2026	Ironi Tiberias	61	(13)
2026–	Žalgiris	11	(3)

International career
2017	Ukraine U19	1	(0)
2017–2018	Ukraine U21	7	(2)
- * Club domestic league appearances and goals as of 17 September 2026

Stanislav Bilenkyi (Ukrainian: Станіслав Сергійович Біленький; born 22 August 1998) is a Ukrainian professional footballer who plays as a striker for TOPLYGA club Žalgiris.

== Career ==
Bilenkyi is a product of the Shakhtar's and Olimpik's academies in his native Donetsk.

He played in the Ukrainian Premier League Reserves and made his debut for Olimpik Donetsk in the Ukrainian Premier League in a match against Zorya Luhansk on 31 May 2017.

On 17 December 2021, he signed a two-year contract with Georgian club Dinamo Tbilisi.

=== Žalgiris ===
On 22 May 2026, Žalgiris announced the signing of Bilenkyi. On 30 July, he scored a hat-trick in the second round of UEFA Conference League qualifying as Žalgiris beat his former club Dinamo Tbilisi 7–2 to advance 7–5 on aggregate.

== Honours ==
DAC Dunajská Streda

- Slovak Super Liga runner-up: 2018–19

Dinamo Tbilisi

- Erovnuli Liga: 2022

Individual

- Ukrainian Premier League Reserves top scorer: 2016–17
