= Molodizhne =

Molodizhne (Ukrainian: Молодіжне) may refer to several places in Ukraine:

- Molodizhne, Simferopol Raion, Crimea
- Molodizhne, Alchevsk Raion, Luhansk Oblast
- Molodizhne, Kirovohrad Oblast
- Molodizhne, Donetsk Oblast
