= Vasyl Kostyuk =

Ukrainian footballer

Personal information
- Full name: Vasyl Kostyuk
- Date of birth: 9 February 1989 (age 37)
- Place of birth: Lebedyn, Ukrainian SSR, Soviet Union
- Height: 1.82 m (5 ft 11 1/2 in)
- Position: Defender

Youth career
- 2001–2002: FC Boryspil (youth)
- 2003–2006: RVUFK Kyiv

Senior career*
Years	Team	Apps	(Gls)
2006	Dynamo-3 Kyiv	15	(0)
2007	CSKA Kyiv	3	(0)
2008–2009	Zorya Luhansk	6	(0)
2010	Stal-2 Alchevsk	1	(0)
2011	Lysychansk	10	(2)
2011–2012	Mykolaiv	10	(0)
2013	Enerhiya Mykolaiv	7	(2)
2014	Sokil Morozivka		

International career
2004	Ukraine U17	2	(0)
- * Club domestic league appearances and goals

Vasyl Kostyuk (born 9 February 1989) is a Ukrainian professional football forward who plays for Zorya in the Ukrainian Premier League. He is the product of the Dynamo Kyiv Youth school system.
