= Kiril Popov (footballer) =

Ukrainian footballer (born 2003)

Personal information
- Full name: Kiril Yuriyovych Popov
- Date of birth: 1 May 2003 (age 23)
- Place of birth: Nizhyn, Ukraine
- Height: 1.83 m (6 ft 0 in)
- Position: Forward

Team information
- Current team: Chornomorets Odesa
- Number: 11

Youth career
- 2016–2020: Dynamo Kyiv

Senior career*
Years	Team	Apps	(Gls)
2020–2023	Dynamo Kyiv	0	(0)
2022–2023	→ Kolos Kovalivka (loan)	24	(0)
2023–2024	Kolos Kovalivka	4	(0)
2024	→ Mynai (loan)	6	(0)
2024–	Chornomorets Odesa	43	(2)

International career^{‡}
2019	Ukraine U17	9	(0)
2022	Ukraine U19	3	(1)
- * Club domestic league appearances and goals as of 2 August 2026 ‡ National team caps and goals as of 13 September 2023

Kiril Yuriyovych Popov (Ukrainian: Кіріл Юрійович Попов; born 1 May 2003) is a Ukrainian professional footballer who plays for Ukrainian club Chornomorets Odesa.

== Club career ==
Popov made his professional debut for Dynamo Kyiv on the 24 November 2020, coming on as a substitute for Oleksandr Karavayev in a 2019–20 UEFA Champions League match against Barcelona.

=== Chornomorets Odesa ===
On 3 August 2024, Popov joined Ukrainian Premier League side Chornomorets Odesa, making his debut against Kryvbas Kryvyi Rih on 3 August 2024. On 21 February 2025 in the 18th round match of the 2025–26 Ukrainian Premier League between Kolos Kovalivka and Chornomorets he scored his first goal as a player of Chornomorets.

== Honours ==
Chornomorets Odesa

- Ukrainian First League runner-up: 2025–26

Individual

- Top scorer: 2020–21 Ukrainian Premier League U-19 competitions
