= Serhiy Kurta =

Ukrainian footballer

Personal information
- Full name: Serhiy Ivanovych Kurta
- Date of birth: 30 June 1993 (age 33)
- Place of birth: Zakarpattia Oblast, Ukraine
- Height: 1.87 m (6 ft 1 1/2 in)
- Position: Striker

Team information
- Current team: Prameň Kováčová

Youth career
- 2005–2007: Youth Sportive School Uzhhorod
- 2008–2010: BRW-BIK Volodymyr-Volynskyi

Senior career*
Years	Team	Apps	(Gls)
2010–2011	Hirnyk-Sport Komsomolsk	15	(3)
2011–2012	FC Serednye (Amateur)	?	(?)
2012–2014	Hoverla Uzhhorod	1	(0)
2014	FC Serne Mukacheve (Amateur)	?	(?)
2014–2016	Nové Zámky	19	(6)
2016–2017	ŠK Selce	31	(25)
2018	SV Leiben	?	(?)
2018	Prameň Kováčová	12	(8)
2019	SV Leiben	?	(?)
2019–	Prameň Kováčová	12	(5)
- * Club domestic league appearances and goals as of 18 May 2020

Serhiy Kurta (Ukrainian: Сергій Іванович Курта; born 30 June 1993 in Zakarpattia Oblast, Ukraine) is a Ukrainian football striker who plays for Prameň Kováčová in the 3. Liga.

Kurta spent some years in the Sportive Youth system in Uzhhorod. He made his debut in the Ukrainian Premier League in a match against Vorskla Poltava entraining in the second half-time on 26 May 2013.
