= Leon Hladkovskyi =

Ukrainian footballer

Personal information
- Full name: Leon Yuriyovych Hladkovskyi
- Date of birth: 12 April 2002 (age 24)
- Place of birth: Kharkiv, Ukraine
- Height: 1.78 m (5 ft 10 in)
- Position: Centre-forward

Team information
- Current team: Rubikon Kyiv
- Number: 99

Youth career
- Metalist Kharkiv
- Arsenal Kharkiv
- –2012: Barcelona
- 2013–2014: Metalist Kharkiv
- 2014: Neurofutbol
- 2014: Vila Olimpica
- 2015: Sant Andreu
- 2015–2017: Shakhtar Donetsk
- 2017–2019: Dynamo Kyiv

Senior career*
Years	Team	Apps	(Gls)
2019	Dynamo Kyiv	0	(0)
2019–2022	Vorskla Poltava	0	(0)
2021–2022	→ Vovchansk (loan)	18	(4)
2022–	Rubikon Kyiv	9	(0)

International career^{‡}
2018	Ukraine U17	2	(0)
- * Club domestic league appearances and goals as of 7 February 2023 ‡ National team caps and goals as of 20 September 2022

Leon Yuriyovych Hladkovskyi (Ukrainian: Леон Юрійович Гладковський; born 12 April 2002) is a Ukrainian professional footballer who plays as a centre-forward for Ukrainian Second League club Rubikon Kyiv.
