= Dmytro Lukanov =

Ukrainian footballer

Personal information
- Full name: Dmytro Volodymyrovych Lukanov
- Date of birth: 2 March 1995 (age 31)
- Place of birth: Kyiv, Ukraine
- Height: 1.80 m (5 ft 11 in)
- Position: Striker

Youth career
- 2008–2012: Atlet Kyiv

Senior career*
Years	Team	Apps	(Gls)
2012–	Zorya Luhansk	2	(0)

International career^{‡}
2013	Ukraine U18	5	(1)
2013	Ukraine U19	5	(0)
2015	Ukraine U20	2	(0)
- * Club domestic league appearances and goals as of 4 February 2017 ‡ National team caps and goals as of 4 February 2017

Dmytro Volodymyrovych Lukanov (Ukrainian: Дмитро Володимирович Луканов; born 2 March 1995) is a professional Ukrainian football striker.

== Career ==
He is a product of the FC Atlet Kyiv School System. His first trainer was Dmytro Murashenko.

He made his debut for FC Metalist in the match against FC Shakhtar Donetsk on 18 April 2015 in the Ukrainian Premier League.
