= Denys Khomutov =

Association football player

Personal information
- Full name: Denys Oleksandrovych Khomutov
- Date of birth: 7 August 1979 (age 47)
- Place of birth: Donetsk, Ukrainian SSR
- Height: 1.81 m (5 ft 11 1/2 in)
- Position: Midfielder

Team information
- Current team: Nõmme Kalju (assistant)

Youth career
- 198?–1995: UOR Donetsk

Senior career*
Years	Team	Apps	(Gls)
1995–2000	Shakhtar Donetsk	0	(0)
1995–2000	→ Shakhtar-2 Donetsk	140	(16)
2000–2001	Polihraftekhnika Oleksandriya	33	(2)
2001	→ Zirka Kirovohrad (loan)	3	(1)
2002–2003	Shakhtar Donetsk	0	(0)
2002–2003	→ Shakhtar-2 Donetsk	47	(2)
2002	→ Shakhtar-3 Donetsk	1	(0)
2003	Zirka Kirovohrad	8	(0)
2004	Nyva Vinnytsia	11	(0)
2004	Stal Alchevsk	8	(0)
2005	Olimpik Donetsk	18	(3)
2006	Spartak Sumy	10	(1)
2006–2009	Olimpik Donetsk	83	(17)

Managerial career
- 2014–2017: Olimpik Donetsk (assistant)
- 2017–2018: Gagra
- 2018–2019: Telavi
- 2020–2021: Nõmme Kalju (assistant)
- 2021–2022: Chaika Borshchahivka
- * Club domestic league appearances and goals

Denys Khomutov (Ukrainian: Денис Олександрович Хомутов; born 7 August 1979) is a Ukrainian retired footballer who current football manager.

== Career ==
Khomuov started his senior career with Shakhtar Donetsk. In 2000, he signed for Oleksandriya in the Ukrainian First League, where he made thirty-three league appearances and scored two goals. After that, he played for Zirka Kropyvnytskyi, Nyva Vinnytsia, Stal Alchevsk, Olimpik Donetsk, and Spartak Sumy.

== Personal life ==
His son Vladyslav Khomutov is also a football player.
