= Eduard Khavrov =

Ukrainian footballer and manager

Personal information
- Date of birth: 14 October 1969 (age 57)
- Place of birth: Ukrainian SSR, Soviet Union
- Position: Midfielder

Senior career*
Years	Team	Apps	(Gls)
1987	Novator Zhdanov	3	(0)
1991	Novator Mariupol	3	(0)
1993–1994	Azovmash Mariupol	26	(0)
1994	AFC-UOR Mariupol	11	(0)

Managerial career
- 2003–2004: Illichivets-2 Mariupol (assistant)
- 2005–2006: Portovyk Mariupol
- 2007: Illichivets-2 Mariupol
- 2008–2010: Illichivets Mariupol (reserves)
- 2011–2012: Illichivets-2 Mariupol (assistant)
- 2012–2015: Illichivets Mariupol (reserves)
- 2015–2016: Inhulets Petrove
- 2017: Polissya Zhytomyr
- 2018–2019: Krystal Chortkiv
- 2019–2020: Krystal Kherson
- 2021–2022: Enerhiya Nova Kakhovka
- * Club domestic league appearances and goals

Eduard Khavrov (Ukrainian: Едуард Анатолійович Хавров, born 14 October 1969) is a Ukrainian professional football manager and former player.

On 9 July 2019 Eduard Khavrov was appointed the head coach of FC Krystal Kherson.
