= Serhiy Davydov =

Ukrainian football striker

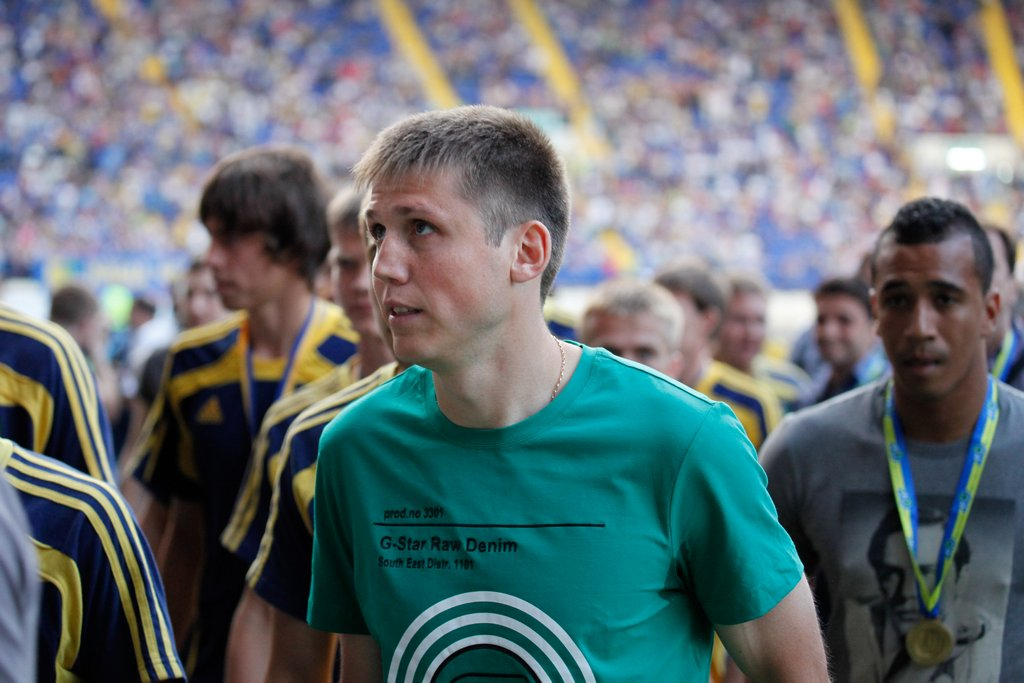

Personal information
- Full name: Serhiy Viktorovych Davydov
- Date of birth: 16 December 1984 (age 41)
- Place of birth: Eskhar, Kharkiv Oblast, Ukrainian SSR
- Height: 1.79 m (5 ft 10 1/2 in)
- Position: Striker

Senior career*
Years	Team	Apps	(Gls)
2003–2010	Metalist Kharkiv	28	(1)
2003–2005	→ Metalist-2 Kharkiv	56	(14)
2008	→ Volyn Lutsk (loan)	1	(0)
2008–2010	→ Zakarpattia Uzhhorod (loan)	57	(11)
2011	Zakarpattia Uzhhorod	5	(3)
2011	→ Oleksandriya (loan)	10	(0)
2012–2014	Helios Kharkiv	42	(4)
2014	Metalist Kharkiv	2	(0)
2016	Druzhba Kharkiv (amateurs)	3	(4)
2016–2020	Metalist 1925 Kharkiv	99	(36)
2020–2021	Metal Kharkiv	8	(1)
2021	Skif Shulhynka (amateurs)		
- * Club domestic league appearances and goals

Serhiy Davydov (Ukrainian: Сергій Вікторович Давидов; born 16 December 1984, in Ukrainian SSR, Soviet Union) is a former Ukrainian football striker.

== Career ==
He played for Metalist Kharkiv in the Ukrainian Premier League.
