= Artur Zahorulko =

Ukrainian footballer

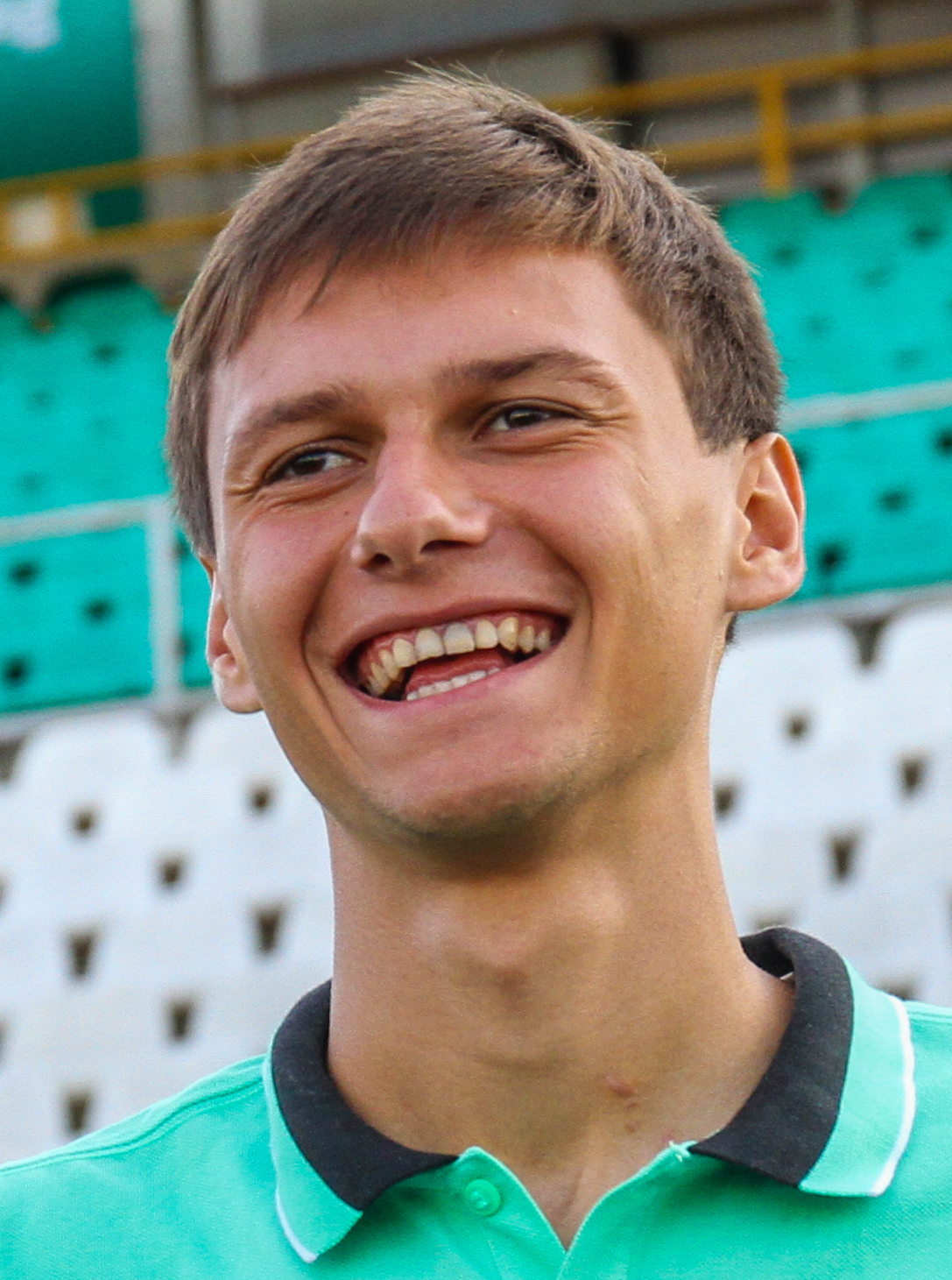

Personal information
- Full name: Artur Yuriyovych Zahorulko
- Date of birth: 13 February 1993 (age 33)
- Place of birth: Odesa, Ukraine
- Height: 1.80 m (5 ft 11 in)
- Positions: Midfielder; forward

Team information
- Current team: Nyva Vinnytsia
- Number: 10

Youth career
- 2005–2009: Chornomorets Odesa
- 2009–2010: Shakhtar Donetsk

Senior career*
Years	Team	Apps	(Gls)
2011–2018	Shakhtar Donetsk	0	(0)
2011	→ Shakhtar-3 Donetsk	8	(3)
2013–2014	→ Shakhtar-3 Donetsk	25	(8)
2015	→ Zorya Luhansk (loan)	1	(0)
2016	→ Illichivets Mariupol (loan)	10	(6)
2016–2017	→ Vorskla Poltava (loan)	36	(2)
2018	Olimpik Donetsk	1	(0)
2018	Rukh Vynnyky	7	(1)
2019–	Nyva Vinnytsia	127	(73)
2022	→ Zeta (loan)	9	(3)
- * Club domestic league appearances and goals as of 4 June 2026

Artur Zahorulko (Ukrainian: Артур Юрійович Загорулько; born 13 February 1993) is a Ukrainian footballer who plays as a midfielder and striker for FC Nyva Vinnytsia.

== Career ==
Zahorulko is product of Youth Sportive School No.11 (FC Chornomorets Odesa) and of FC Shakhtar Donetsk youth systems. His first trainer was Serhiy Zaykov. From July 2015 he is playing on loan for FC Zorya.

He made his début in the Ukrainian Premier League, played for FC Zorya Luhansk in the game against FC Metalurh Zaporizhya in 17 July 2015.
