= Serhiy Shyshchenko =

Ukrainian footballer (born 1976)

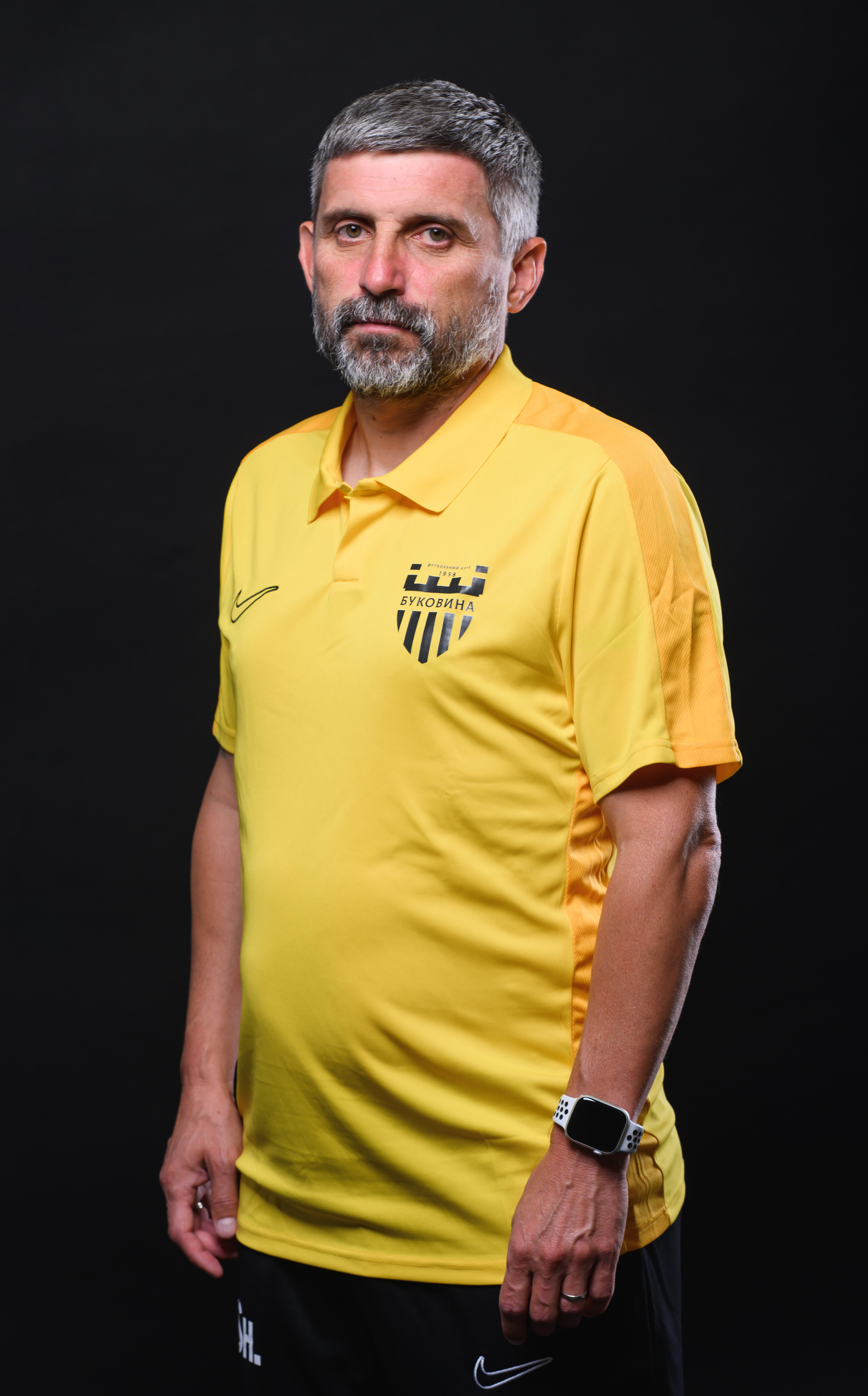

Personal information
- Full name: Serhiy Yuriyovych Shyshchenko
- Date of birth: 13 January 1976 (age 50)
- Place of birth: Siriaky, Kharkiv Oblast, Ukrainian SSR
- Height: 1.68 m (5 ft 6 in)
- Position: Midfielder

Team information
- Current team: Bukovyna Chernivtsi (head coach)

Youth career
- Olympik Kharkiv

Senior career*
Years	Team	Apps	(Gls)
1992–1993	Olympik Kharkiv	18	(6)
1992–1994	Metalist Kharkiv	28	(2)
1994–1997	Shakhtar Donetsk	23	(1)
1995	→ Shakhtar-2 Donetsk	6	(1)
1995–1996	→ Nyva Ternopil (loan)	28	(3)
1997	→ Shakhtar-2 Donetsk	1	(0)
1997–1998	Kryvbas Kryvyi Rih	21	(2)
1998	Baltika Kaliningrad	8	(0)
1998–1999	Metalurh Zaporizhzhia	10	(1)
1999	→ Metalurh-2 Zaporizhzhia	1	(1)
1999–2003	Metalurh Donetsk	102	(24)
2003	→ Metalurh-2 Donetsk	1	(0)
2003–2005	Illichivets Mariupol	25	(5)
2004–2006	Metalurh Donetsk	32	(9)
2005–2006	Metalurh Zaporizhzhia	8	(1)
2006–2008	Chornomorets Odesa	54	(3)
2008–2009	Metalurh Donetsk	24	(1)
Total		390	(60)

International career
2001–2005	Ukraine	14	(1)

Managerial career
- 2010–2015: Metalurh Donetsk (youth)
- 2015–2016: Stal Dniprodzerzhynsk (youth)
- 2016: Bukovyna Chernivtsi
- 2017–2018: Shakhtar Donetsk (U19)
- 2018–2019: Mykolaiv
- 2020–2021: Polissya Zhytomyr
- 2023–2024: Zviahel
- 2024: Polissya Zhytomyr (caretaker)
- 2024–2025: Obolon Kyiv
- 2025–: Bukovyna Chernivtsi
- * Club domestic league appearances and goals

Serhiy Yuriyovych Shyshchenko (Ukrainian: Сергій Юрійович Шищенко; born 13 January 1976) is a Ukrainian football manager and former professional player.

== Career ==
Shyshchenko played for teams like Metalurh Donetsk, Metalurh Zaporizhzhia, Kryvbas Kryvyi Rih, Olympik Kharkiv, Metalist Kharkiv, Shakhtar Donetsk, and Nyva Ternopil. In the summer of 2008, Shyshchenko moved back to Metalurh Donetsk.

Shyshchenko made 14 appearances for the Ukraine national team from 2001 to 2005.

== Career statistics ==
Scores and results list Ukraine's goal tally first.

No	Date	Venue	Opponent	Score	Result	Competition
1.	27 March 2002	Stadionul Gheorghe Hagi, Constanța, Romania	Romania	1–4	1–4	Friendly match
