= Andriy Kuptsov =

Ukrainian footballer (born 1971)

Personal information
- Full name: Andriy Serhiyovych Kuptsov
- Date of birth: 23 January 1971 (age 55)
- Place of birth: Kryvyi Rih, Soviet Union
- Height: 1.70 m (5 ft 7 in)
- Position: Midfielder

Senior career*
| Years | Team | Apps | (Gls) |
| 1987–1989 | Kryvbas Kryvyi Rih | 63 | (0) |
| 1989–1995 | Shakhtar Donetsk | 40 | (0) |
| 1992 | → Shakhtar-2 Donetsk | 20 | (3) |
| 1995 | Kolos Krasnodar | 10 | (0) |
| 1995 | Kryvbas Kryvyi Rih | 8 | (0) |
| 1996 | Kremin Kremenchuk | 15 | (0) |
| 1997 | Karpaty Lviv | 9 | (0) |
| 1997 | Kryvbas Kryvyi Rih | 21 | (0) |
| 1998–1999 | Torpedo Zaporizhzhia | 23 | (0) |
| 1999–2000 | Metalurh Donetsk | 13 | (1) |
| Total | | 222 | (4) |

Managerial career
- 2002–2006: Kryvbas Kryvyi Rih (assistant)
- 2004: Kryvbas Kryvyi Rih (caretaker)
- 2006–2007: Kryvbas Kryvyi Rih (youth)
- 2007–2009: Inter Baku (assistant)
- 2010–2012: Oleksandriya (assistant)
- 2012: Oleksandriya (caretaker)
- 2012–2013: Oleksandriya
- 2013: Karpaty Lviv (assistant)
- 2013–2014: Karpaty Lviv (youth)
- 2015–2019: Oleksandriya (youth)
- 2019–2021: Oleksandriya (assistant)
- 2021: Kryvbas Kryvyi Rih (assistant)
- 2021: Kryvbas Kryvyi Rih (caretaker)
- 2021–2022: Nyva Ternopil
- * Club domestic league appearances and goals

Andriy Serhiyovych Kuptsov (Ukrainian: Андрій Сергійович Купцов; born 23 January 1971) is a Ukrainian professional football manager and former player.

== Playing career ==
Kuptsov played for teams including FC Metalurh Donetsk, FC Torpedo Zaporizhia, FC Kryvbas Kryvyi Rih, FC Karpaty Lviv, FC Shakhtar Donetsk and FC Kremin Kremenchuk.
