= Dmytro Mykhaylenko =

Ukrainian footballer (born 1973)

Dmytro Mykhaylenkо
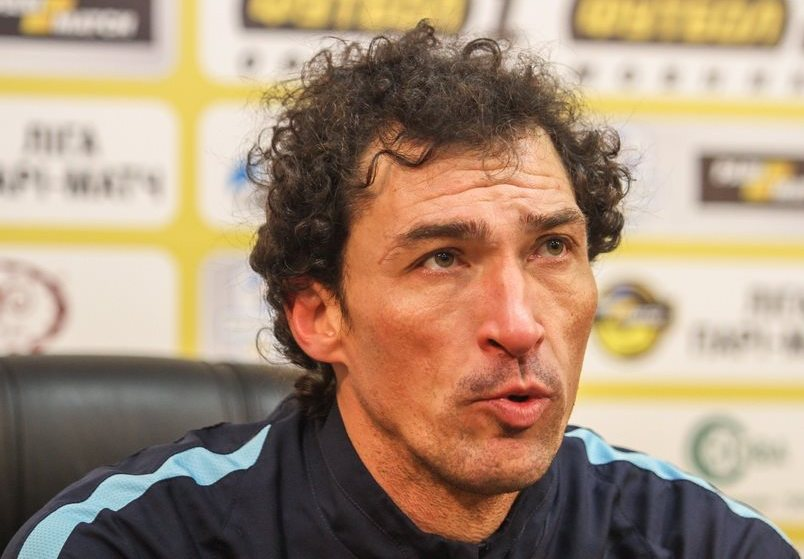
- Mykhaylenko in 2016

Personal information
- Full name: Dmytro Stanislavovych Mykhaylenko
- Date of birth: 13 July 1973 (age 53)
- Place of birth: Kirovohrad, Ukrainian SSR, USSR
- Height: 1.90 m (6 ft 3 in)
- Position: Defensive midfielder

Youth career
- -1990: OShISP Dnipropetrovsk

Senior career*
Years	Team	Apps	(Gls)
1990	Zirka Kirovohrad	7	(0)
1990–1994	Dnipro Dnipropetrovsk	61	(11)
1994–2001	Dynamo Kyiv	132	(16)
1996–2001	→ Dynamo-2 Kyiv	75	(22)
1998–2001	→ Dynamo-3 Kyiv	4	(0)
2001	Hapoel Tel Aviv	14	(2)
2001–2002	Beitar Jerusalem	23	(3)
2002–2006	Dnipro Dnipropetrovsk	73	(5)
2006–2007	Metalurh Zaporizhzhia	19	(0)
2007–2009	APOP Kinyras Peyias	44	(3)
Total		455	(63)

International career
1991	USSR U20		
1992–1995	Ukraine U21		
1994–2000	Ukraine	23	(2)

Managerial career
- 2009–2010: Dnipro Dnipropetrovsk (U21, assistant)
- 2010–2016: Dnipro Dnipropetrovsk (U21)
- 2016–2017: Dnipro (caretaker)
- 2017–2020: Dnipro-1
- 2020–2021: Pafos
Medal record
Men's football
Representing Soviet Union
FIFA World Youth Championship
Bronze medal – third place	1991 Portugal
- * Club domestic league appearances and goals

Dmytro Stanislavovych Mykhaylenko (Ukrainian: Дмитро Станіславович Михайленко; born 13 July 1973) is a Ukrainian football manager and former player. He played as a defensive midfielder.

His son Ivan is also a player, a forward; his older brother Oleksandr played for FC Zirka Kirovohrad and FC Oleksandriya.

== International career ==
Mykhaylenko won the bronze medal in the FIFA World Youth Championship 1991 with the Soviet Union U20 national team at the age of 17.

He was in the squad of the Ukraine U21 national team which finished second in 1996 UEFA European Under-21 Football Championship Qualifying round group 4.

He made his senior debut with Ukraine against Israel, 27 April 1993.

== Media career ==
Upon retiring from football, Mykhaylenko became a commentator for Ukrainian Premier League football matches, debuting on 25 July 2009 in the home match of Dnipro Dnipropetrovsk - Metalist Kharkiv, in which Dnipro Dnipropetrovsk won 2–0.

== Managerial career ==
On 30 June 2016, Mykhaylenko was appointed acting head coach of Dnipro Dnipropetrovsk's first team, and later moved to the newly created Dnipro-1 together with the coaching staff.

== Career statistics ==
=== Club ===
Appearances and goals by club, season and competition
Club	Season	League			National cup		Continental		Other		Total	
Club	Season	Division	Apps	Goals	Apps	Goals	Apps	Goals	Apps	Goals	Apps	Goals
Zirka Kirovohrad	1990	Soviet Second League B	7	0	—		—		—		7	0
Dnipro Dnipropetrovsk	1990	Reserves	—		—		—		1	0	1	0
Dnipro Dnipropetrovsk	1991	Soviet Top League	9	1	1	0	—		—		10	1
Dnipro Dnipropetrovsk	1992	Vyshcha Liha	1	0	—		—		—		1	0
Dnipro Dnipropetrovsk	1992–93	Vyshcha Liha	19	3	2	1	—		—		21	4
Dnipro Dnipropetrovsk	1993–94	Vyshcha Liha	32	7	3	2	4	1	—		39	10
Dnipro Dnipropetrovsk	Total		61	11	6	3	4	1	1	0	72	15
Dynamo Kyiv	1994–95	Vyshcha Liha	25	5	2	2	8	0	—		35	7
Dynamo Kyiv	1995–96	Vyshcha Liha	32	1	5	1	1	0	—		38	2
Dynamo Kyiv	1996–97	Vyshcha Liha	25	4	2	0	2	0	—		29	4
Dynamo Kyiv	1997–98	Vyshcha Liha	23	0	7	0	8	0	—		38	0
Dynamo Kyiv	1998–99	Vyshcha Liha	12	1	2	0	2	1	—		16	2
Dynamo Kyiv	1999–2000	Vyshcha Liha	10	5	2	1	—		—		16	2
Dynamo Kyiv	2000–01	Vyshcha Liha	5	0	1	0	—		—		6	0
Dynamo Kyiv	Total		132	16	21	4	21	1	—		174	21
Dynamo-2 Kyiv	1996–97	Persha Liha	8	1	—		—		—		8	1
Dynamo-2 Kyiv	1997–98	Persha Liha	22	8	—		—		—		22	8
Dynamo-2 Kyiv	1998–99	Persha Liha	9	2	—		—		—		9	2
Dynamo-2 Kyiv	1999–2000	Persha Liha	15	3	—		—		—		15	3
Dynamo-2 Kyiv	2000–01	Persha Liha	14	7	?	2	—		—		14	9
Dynamo-2 Kyiv	2001–02	Persha Liha	7	1	—		—		—		7	1
Dynamo-2 Kyiv	Total		75	22	?	2	—		—		75	24
Dynamo-3 Kyiv	1998–99	Druha Liha	1	0	—		—		—		1	0
Dynamo-3 Kyiv	1999–2000	Druha Liha	2	0	—		—		—		2	0
Dynamo-3 Kyiv	2001–02	Druha Liha	1	0	—		—		—		1	0
Hapoel Tel Aviv	2000–01	Israeli Premier League	14	2	—		—		—		14	2
Beitar Jerusalem	2001–02	Israeli Premier League	23	3	—		—		—		23	3
Dnipro Dnipropetrovsk	2002–03	Vyshcha Liha	28	4	6	1	—		—		34	5
Dnipro Dnipropetrovsk	2003–04	Vyshcha Liha	18	0	6	4	8	1	—		32	5
Dnipro Dnipropetrovsk	2004–05	Vyshcha Liha	15	0	5	2	9	2	—		29	4
Dnipro Dnipropetrovsk	2005–06	Vyshcha Liha	12	1	3	0	2	1	—		17	2
Dnipro Dnipropetrovsk	Total		134	16	26	10	23	5	1	0	184	31
Metalurh Zaporizhia	2006–07	Vyshcha Liha	19	0	—		4	0	—		23	0
APOP Kinyras	2007–08	Cypriot First Division	25	1	—		—		—		25	1
APOP Kinyras	2008–09	Cypriot First Division	19	2	—		—		—		19	2
APOP Kinyras	Total		44	3	—		—		—		44	3
Career total			452	62	47	16	48	6	1	0	548	84

=== International ===
Appearances and goals by national team and year
National team	Year	Apps	Goals
Ukraine	1993	3	1
Ukraine	1994	5	1
Ukraine	1995	0	0
Ukraine	1996	3	0
Ukraine	1997	8	0
Ukraine	1998	2	0
Ukraine	1999	0	0
Ukraine	2000	2	0
Total		23	2

Scores and results list Ukraine's goal tally first, score column indicates score after each Mykhaylenko goal.

List of international goals scored by Dmytro Mykhaylenko
No.	Date	Venue	Opponent	Score	Result	Competition
1	18 May 1993	Žalgiris Stadium, Vilnius, Lithuania	Lithuania	2–1	2–1	Friendly
2	25 May 1994	Republican Stadium, Kyiv, Ukraine	Belarus	3–1	3–1	Friendly

== Honours ==
=== As player ===
Dynamo Kyiv

- Ukrainian Premier League (7): 1995, 1996, 1997, 1998, 1999, 2000, 2001
- Ukrainian Cup (4): 1996, 1998, 1999, 2000
- UEFA Champions' League semifinalist: 1999

Dnipro

- Ukrainian Premier League runner-up: 1993
- Ukrainian Cup finalist: 2004

APOP

- Cypriot Cup (1): 2008–09

=== As manager ===
- Ukrainian First League: 2018–19
- Ukrainian Second League runner-up: 2017–18
- Ukrainian Premier League (youth): 2014–15
