= Volodymyr Mykytin =

Ukrainian footballer

Personal information
- Full name: Volodymyr Bohdanovych Mykytin
- Date of birth: 28 April 1970 (age 56)
- Place of birth: Krasnyi Luch, Ukrainian SSR
- Height: 1.75 m (5 ft 9 in)
- Positions: Defender; midfielder

Youth career
- 1979–????: DYuSSh Krasnyi Luch
- ????–1987: ShISP Voroshylovhrad

Senior career*
Years	Team	Apps	(Gls)
1987–1988	Stakhanovets Stakhanov	11	(0)
1988	Shakhtar Donetsk	0	(0)
1989–1990	SKA Odesa	64	(0)
1991–1996	Zorya Luhansk	169	(5)
1996–1998	Karpaty Lviv	60	(4)
1998	→ Karpaty-2 Lviv	1	(0)
1998–2000	Shakhtar Donetsk	26	(0)
1999–2000	→ Shakhtar-2 Donetsk	9	(0)
2000	Vorskla Poltava	7	(0)
2001–2003	Rostov	46	(0)
2004–2006	Zorya Luhansk	0	(0)
2004	→ Zorya-Hirnyk Yubileyne (loan)	1	(0)
2004–2006	→ Ahata Luhansk (loan)	41	(1)
2005	→ Stal Dniprodzerzhynsk (loan)	11	(0)
2011	Zorya-2 Luhansk	0	(0)
Total		446	(10)

International career
1998–1999	Ukraine	13	(0)

Managerial career
- 2006: Zorya-2 Luhansk
- 2007–2020: Zorya Luhansk (U21)
- 2020–2024: Metalurh Zaporizhzhia
- * Club domestic league appearances and goals

Volodymyr Bohdanovych Mykytin (Ukrainian: Володимир Богданович Микитін; born 28 April 1970) is a Ukrainian professional football coach and a former player. He is the current manager of Metalurh Zaporizhzhia since August 2020.

== Club career ==
Mykytin started to play football at a local sports school in Krasnyi Luch in 1979, later he played for the Voroshylovhrad boarding school of sports specialization (Shkola Internat Sportifnogo Profilia).

He made his professional debut at age 17 playing in the 1987 Soviet Second League for FC Stakhanovets Stakhanov. In 1989–1990 Mykytin also played for the Second League team of the Odessa Military District SKA Odessa.

His debut at continental club competitions Mykytin made for Shakhtar Donetsk when on 10 August 1999 he came out on substitution in home game against the Macedonian side Sileks Kratovo during the 1999–2000 UEFA Cup.

In 2004 return to Luhansk after few years playing in neighboring Russia for Rostov. In Luhansk Mykytin retired from playing career in 2006 and become a coach within Zorya Luhansk youth system. Due to the Russian aggression against Ukraine, in 2014 along with the club was forced to relocate to Zaporizhzhia.

== International career ==
Mykytin made his international debut for Ukraine on 15 July 1998 in a home friendly game against Poland which Ukraine lost 1:2. In total he played 13 international games scoring no goals during 1998–1999 in friendly games and qualification games to the UEFA Euro 2000.

During that period he changed from Karpaty Lviv to Shakhtar Donetsk.

== Coaching career ==
His coaching career Mykytin started in 2006 with the Zorya Luhansk youth system and in 2007–2020 he was a senior coach of Zorya reserves and under-21 team.

=== Metalurh Zaporizhzhia ===
In August 2020 Mykytin accepted his first managerial post in Metalurh Zaporizhzhia as since 2014 Zorya is quartered in Zaporizhzhia, due to the Russian aggression against Ukraine.

== Honours ==
- Russian Cup finalist: 2003.
