= FC Dnipro-2 Dnipropetrovsk =

FC Dnipro-2
- Full name: Football Club Dnipro-2
- Founded: 1997; 28 years ago
- Dissolved: 2012; 13 years ago
- Ground: Meteor
- Capacity: 24,381
- President: Ihor Kolomoyskyi
- Head Coach: Volodymyr Horily
- League: Ukrainian Second League
- 2010–11: 12th
- Website: http://www.fcdnipro.ua/

FC Dnipro-2 (Ukrainian: ФК Дніпро-2) was the reserve team of FC Dnipro.

== History ==
The club initially competed in the Dnipropetrovsk Oblast competition as FC Dnipro-2 Dnipropetrovsk .

In 1997 the club was entered into the professional leagues to compete in the Second League.

In 2004, when the PFL organised a competition for reserve teams of Premier League clubs the club moved into that competition.

In 2010 the club was entered as Dnipro's third team in the professional leagues as Dnipro-2.

== Honours ==
- Ukrainian Druha Liha: 1

1999/2000 Champions Group C

== League and cup history ==
=== Dnipro-2 ===
Season	Div.	Pos.	Pl.	W	D	L	GS	GA	P	Domestic Cup	Europe	Notes
1997–98	3rd "B"	7	32	11	10	11	41	40	43	1/128 finals		
1998–99	3rd "C"	7	26	13	5	8	22	23	44	Did not Enter		
1999-00	3rd "C"	1	26	17	6	3	44	15	57	1/8 finals Second League Cup		Promoted
2000–01	2nd	11	34	13	4	17	41	43	43			
2001–02	2nd	17	34	8	7	19	29	48	31			Relegated
2002–03	3rd "C"	8	28	10	4	14	28	34	34			
2003–04	3rd "C"	12	30	9	2	19	36	56	23			Club moves to Reserve competition
Club revives its second team as FC Dnipro-75 Dnipropetrovsk was expelled in 2010.
2010–11	3rd "B"	12	22	3	3	16	13	41	9			−3
2011–12	3rd "B"	11	26	6	5	15	24	42	23			

== See also ==
- FC Dnipro
- FC Dnipro-75 Dnipropetrovsk
