= Oleksiy =

Oleksii, Oleksiy, Oleksij, Oleksy, or Oleksiĭ (Ukrainian: Олексій [olekˈs⁽ʲ⁾ij]) is a Ukrainian male given name. It is a variant of Alexey, which itsel is a descendant of the Ancient Greek Alexius. Notable individuals with the name include:

- Oleksiy Ananenko (born 1959), Ukrainian engineer who worked at the Chernobyl power plant
- Oleksiy Azarov (born 1971), Soviet-born Austrian businessman
- Oleksiy Bazyuk (1873–1952), Greek Catholic hierarch
- Oleksiy Bessarabov (born 1976), Ukrainian journalist
- Oleksiy Borysov (born 1983), Ukrainian sailor
- Oleksii Chubashev (1991–2022), Ukrainian military journalist
- Oleksiy Fedorov (1901–1989), Soviet partisan
- Oleksii Gnatkovskyi (born 1985), Ukrainian stage actor
- Oleksiy Gorbunov (born 1961), Ukrainian actor
- Oleksii Hunovskyi (1882–1961), Ukrainian Greek Catholic priest
- Oleksiy Khilskyi (1987–2023), Ukrainian actor
- Oleksii Khyzhniak (soldier) (1989–2022), Ukrainian military captain
- Oleksii Kot (born 1977), Ukrainian lawyer
- Oleksii Kovalchuk (born 1989), Ukrainian poker player
- Oleksii Kovalenko (1981–2022), Ukrainian military major
- Oleksii Krupskyy (born 1978), Ukrainian jazz guitarist
- Oleksiy Kuznetsov (born 1991), Ukrainian singer
- Oleksiy Logvynenko (1946–2016), Ukrainian translator
- Oleksiy Makukhin (born 1980), Ukrainian film producer
- Oleksiy Marchenko (1880s–1921), Ukrainian anarchist military leader
- Oleksii Marchenko (general) (born 1968), Ukrainian military commander
- Oleksiy Matsuka (born 1983), Ukrainian journalist
- Oleksii Mes (1993–2024), Ukrainian fighter pilot
- Oleksii Mishurin (1912–1982), Ukrainian actor
- Oleksii Mustafin (born 1971), Ukrainian media-manager, journalist, and politician
- Oleksiy-Nestor Naumenko (born 1973), Ukrainian filmmaker
- Oleksiy Neizhpapa (born 1975), Ukrainian naval vice admiral
- Oleksiy Onyschenko (born 1933), the head of the Department of History, Philosophy and Law of the National Academy of Sciences of Ukraine
- Oleksii Opanasiuk (born 1993), Ukrainian entrepreneur
- Oleksiy Ivanovich Poroshenko (1936–2020), Ukrainian businessman and son of president Petro Poroshenko
- Oleksiy Andriyovych Potapenko (born 1981), name of Ukrainian rapper Potap
- Oleksiy Povchiy (1754–1831), Greek Catholic hierarch
- Oleksiy Prylipka (born 1944), Ukrainian agronomist and political scientist
- Oleksiy Ryabchyn (born 1983), Ukrainian green businessman
- Oleksiy Sai (born 1975), Ukrainian contemporary artist
- Oleksiy Shandar (born 1973), Ukrainian military officer
- Oleksii Shovkunenko (1884–1974), Soviet painter
- Oleksiy Sofiyenko (1952–2011), Ukrainian poet
- Oleksii Tiunin, Estonian-Ukrainian soldier
- Oleksiy Tolochko (born 1963), Ukrainian medievalist
- Oleksii Tykhy (1927–1984), Ukrainian linguist and activist
- Oleksiy Vadaturskyy (1947–2022), Ukrainian agro-businessman
- Oleksii Yukov (1985–2026), Ukrainian war archaeologist
- Oleksiy Zaryckyy (1912–1963), Ukrainian Catholic priest
- Oleksii Zhylenko, Ukrainian dance coach

== Politics ==
- Oleksii Arestovych (born 1975), Ukrainian politician, consultant and journalist
- Oleksii Bilyi (born 1961), Ukrainian politician
- Oleksiy Chernyshov (born 1977), Ukrainian politician and businessman
- Oleksiy Chubenko (1889–?), 20th-century Ukrainian anarchist diplomat
- Oleksii Danchenko (1904–1983), Soviet politician
- Oleksiy Danilov (born 1962), Ukrainian politician
- Oleksii Dniprov (born 1982), Ukrainian politician
- Oleksiy Goncharenko (born 1980), Ukrainian politician
- Oleksiy Honcharuk (born 1984), Ukrainian Prime Minister
- Oleksii Kaida (born 1971), Ukrainian politician
- Oleksiy Kartunov (born 1940), a Doctor of Political Science, professor and a member of the Ukrainian Academy of Political Science
- Oleksii Kharchenko (born 1987), Uzbekistani-born Ukrainian politician
- Oleksiy Kostusyev (born 1954), Ukrainian politician
- Oleksii Kovalov (1989–2022), Ukrainian politician
- Oleksii Krasov (born 1987), Ukrainian politician
- Oleksiy Kucher (born 1985), Ukrainian politician and governor
- Oleksiy Kucherenko (born 1961), Ukrainian politician
- Oleksii Kulahin (born 1955), Ukrainian politician
- Oleksiy Kuleba (born 1983), Ukrainian politician
- Oleksiy Kuznyetsov (born 1979), Ukrainian politician
- Oleksiy Leonov (born 1983), Ukrainian politician
- Oleksiy Liubchenko (born 1971), Ukrainian politician
- Oleksii Makeiev (born 1975), Ukrainian ambassador
- Oleksiy Movchan (born 1994), Ukrainian politician
- Oleksiy Mulyarenko (born 1976), Ukrainian politician
- Oleksii Murzhenko (1942–1999), Soviet human rights activist
- Oleksiy Orzhel (born 1984), Ukrainian politician and energy expert
- Oleksiy Pavlenko (born 1977), Ukrainian politician and businessman
- Oleksii Poroshenko (born 1985), Ukrainian politician
- Oleksiy Remeniuk (1956–2022), Ukrainian politician
- Oleksii Reva (born 1953), Ukrainian politician
- Oleksii Reznikov (born 1966), Ukrainian lawyer and politician
- Oleksiy Skrypnyk (1964–2022), Ukrainian politician
- Oleksii Sobolev (born 1983), Ukrainian politician
- Oleksiy Smyrnov (born 1976), Ukrainian politician
- Oleksiy Symonenko (born 1976), Ukrainian intelligence officer
- Oleksiy Syvak (born 1973), Ukrainian ambassador
- Oleksiy Vatchenko (1914–1985), Soviet politician
- Oleksii Zhmerenetskyi (born 1986), Ukrainian politician
- Oleksiy Zhuravko (1974–2022), Ukrainian politician

== Sports people ==
- Oleksiy Boryslavskiy (born 1968), Ukrainian swimmer
- Oleksii Bryzghalov (born 1971), Ukrainian fencer
- Oleksiy Demyanyuk (1958–1999), Soviet high jumper
- Oleksii Denin (born 1992), Ukrainian beach volleyball player
- Oleksii Denysiuk, Ukrainian paralympic sports shooter
- Oleksii Fedyna (born 1987), Ukrainian paralympic swimmer
- Oleksii Hrabarov (born 2005), Ukrainian swimmer
- Oleksii Hunbin (born 1992), Ukrainian archer
- Oleksiy Kasyanov (born 1985), Ukrainian decathlete
- Oleksiy Kazanin (born 1982), Ukrainian race walker
- Oleksiy Khizhniak (born 1975), Ukrainian weightlifter
- Oleksiy Khlopotnov (born 1946), Soviet sprinter
- Oleksiy Khomin (born 1990), Ukrainian Nordic combined skier
- Oleksiy Kikireshko (born 1977), Ukrainian rally driver
- Oleksiy Kolokoltsev (born 1981), Ukrainian weightlifter
- Oleksii Koliadych (born 1998), Ukrainian-born Polish sprint canoeist
- Oleksii Kolomiiets (born 1997), Ukrainian deaflympic swimmer
- Oleksiy Korobeinikov (1978–2014), Ukrainian biathlete
- Oleksiy Krasovsky (born 1994), Ukrainian cross-country skier
- Oleksiy Kruhliak (1975–2017), Ukrainian fencer
- Oleksii Krutykh (born 2000), Ukrainian tennis player
- Oleksiy Len, birth name of Alex Len (born 1993), Ukrainian basketball player
- Oleksy Lukashevych (born 1977), Ukrainian long jumper
- Oleksiy Mazikin (born 1975), Ukrainian boxer
- Oleksii Novikov (born 1996), Ukrainian powerlifter and 2020 Strongman
- Oleksii Pashkov (born 198), Ukrainian paralympic track and field athlete
- Oleksiy Pecherov (born 1985), Ukrainian basketball player
- Oleksiy Popov (born 1980), Ukrainian futsal player
- Oleksiy Pozdnyakov (born 1995), Ukrainian sprinter
- Oleksiy Pryhorov (born 1987), Ukrainian diver who won an Olympic bronze medal in 2008
- Oleksiy Semenov (born 1982), Ukrainian discus thrower
- Oleksii Seniuk (1974–2022), Ukrainian soldier
- Oleksii Sereda (born 2005), Ukrainian diver
- Oleksiy Shelest (born 1973), Ukrainian race walker
- Oleksii Shumskyi (born 1990), Ukrainian ice dancer
- Oleksiy Shvidkiy (born 1986), Ukrainian skier
- Oleksiy Slivinskiy (born 1972), Ukrainian sprint canoeist
- Oleksii Sokyrskyy (born 1985), Ukrainian hammer thrower
- Oleksiy Tamrazov (born 1975), Ukrainian rally driver
- Oleksiy Torokhtiy (born 1986), Ukrainian weightlifter
- Oleksiy Tsybko (1967–2022), Ukrainian rugby union player and politician
- Oleksiy Vakulenko (1981–2007), Ukrainian wrestler
- Oleksii Virchenko (born 2001), Ukrainian paralympic swimmer
- Oleksii Yanin (1983–2022), Ukrainian athlete and soldier
- Oleksiy Yehorov (born 1964), Ukrainian water polo player
- Oleksiy Zhukov (born 1964), Ukrainian bobsledder

=== Football ===
- Oleksiy Antonov (born 1986), Ukrainian footballer
- Oleksiy Antyukhin (born 1971), Ukrainian footballer
- Oleksiy Babyr (born 1990), Ukrainian football striker
- Oleksii Bashakov (born 1988), Ukrainian football midfielder
- Oleksiy Bashtanenko (born 1994), Ukrainian football goalkeeper
- Oleksiy Boyko (born 1992), Ukrainian football forward
- Oleksiy Byelik (born 1981), Ukrainian football striker
- Oleksiy Bykov (born 1998), Ukrainian footballer
- Oleksiy Cherednyk (born 1960), Soviet football player and scout
- Oleksiy Cheremysin (born 1991), Ukrainian football defender
- Oleksiy Chychykov (born 1987), Ukrainian football striker
- Oleksiy Chystyakov (born 1974), Ukrainian football player and coach
- Oleksiy Dovhyi (born 1989), Ukrainian footballer
- Oleksiy Dytyatyev (born 1988), Ukrainian football defender
- Oleksiy Hai (born 1982), Ukrainian footballer
- Oleksiy Helovani (born 1998), Ukrainian footballer
- Oleksiy Hetman (born 1975), Ukrainian football player and coach
- Oleksiy Hodin (born 1983), Ukrainian midfielder
- Oleksiy Horodov (born 1978), Ukrainian football midfielder
- Oleksiy Husyev (born 2005), Ukrainian footballer
- Oleksiy Hutsulyak (born 1997), Ukrainian football midfielder
- Oleksiy Ivanov (born 1978), Ukrainian football midfielder
- Oleksiy Kashchuk (born 2000), Ukrainian footballer
- Oleksiy Kazakov (born 1990), Ukrainian footballer
- Oleksiy Khakhlyov (born 1999), Ukrainian footballer
- Oleksiy Khoblenko (born 1994), Ukrainian footballer
- Oleksiy Khomenko (born 1994), Ukrainian footballer
- Oleksiy Khramtsov (born 1975), Ukrainian football defender
- Oleksiy Khyzhnyak (born 2001), Ukrainian footballer
- Oleksiy Kovtun (born 1995), Ukrainian football defender
- Oleksiy Kurilov (born 1988), Ukrainian football defender
- Oleksiy Larin (born 1994), Ukrainian footballer
- Oleksiy Lazebnyi (born 1993), Ukrainian football midfielder
- Oleksiy Lobov (born 1997), Ukrainian footballer
- Oleksiy Lutsenko (born 1997), Ukrainian football defender
- Oleksiy Lytovchenko (born 1996), Ukrainian footballer
- Oleksiy Malaki (born 2003), Ukrainian footballer
- Oleksiy Maydanevych (born 1991), Ukrainian footballer
- Oleksiy Milyutin (born 1995), Ukrainian football left-back
- Oleksiy Moyseyenko (born 1991), Ukrainian football striker
- Oleksiy Mykhaylychenko (born 1963), Ukrainian football player and coach
- Oleksiy Omelchenko (born 1989), Ukrainian football striker
- Oleksiy Osipov (born 1975), Ukrainian football player
- Oleksiy Palamarchuk (born 1991), Moldovan-Ukrainian footballer
- Oleksiy Pavelko (born 1986), Ukrainian footballer
- Oleksiy Pinchuk (born 1992), Ukrainian footballer
- Oleksiy Polyanskyi (born 1986), Ukrainian footballer
- Oleksiy Pospyelov (born 1990), Ukrainian footballer
- Oleksiy Prokhorenkov (born 1971), Ukrainian footballer
- Oleksiy Prytulyak (born 1989), Ukrainian footballer
- Oleksiy Rodevych (born 1988), Ukrainian football midfielder
- Oleksiy Rudyka (born 1959), Soviet footballer and coach
- Oleksiy Savchenko (born 1993), Ukrainian footballer
- Oleksiy Shchebetun (born 1997), Ukrainian football forward
- Oleksiy Shevchenko (born 1992), Ukrainian footballer
- Oleksii Shliakotin (born 1989), Ukrainian footballer
- Oleksiy Shpak (born 1998), Ukrainian footballer
- Oleksiy Shubin (1975–2025), Ukrainian footballer
- Oleksii Slutskyi (born 2002), Ukrainian football goalkeeper
- Oleksiy Sych (born 2001), Ukrainian football defender
- Oleksiy Sydorov (born 2001), Ukrainian footballer
- Oleksiy Tupchiy (born 1986), Ukrainian footballer
- Oleksiy Tymchenko (born 1985), Ukrainian football midfielder
- Oleksiy Tyshchenko (born 1994), Ukrainian midfielder
- Oleksiy Varnavsky (1957–2008), Soviet footballer
- Oleksiy Velychko (born 1954), Ukrainian football coach
- Oleksiy Yakymenko (born 1974), Ukrainian football midfielder
- Oleksiy Zbun (born 1997), Ukrainian footballer
- Oleksiy Zenchenko (born 1996), Ukrainian football defender
- Oleksii Zhdanovych (born 2003), Ukrainian football midfielder
- Oleksiy Zinkevych (born 1997), Ukrainian football midfielder
- Oleksiy Zozulya (born 1992), Ukrainian footballer
