= 2008–09 FC Kremin Kremenchuk season =

Kremin
2008–09 season
- President: Oleh Babaev
- Head coach: Serhiy Svystun
- Second League Group B: 13th
- Ukrainian Cup: Second preliminary round
- Top goalscorer: League: Oleksiy Tymchenko (2); Roman Kunev (2); All: Oleksiy Tymchenko (2); Roman Kunev (2)

The 2008-09 season was FC Kremin Kremenchuk's 3rd consecutive season in the Second League Group B.

== Players ==
=== Squad information ===
N	Pos.	Nat.	Name	Age	Since	App	Goals	Ends	Transfer fee	Notes
1	GK	(Ukraine)	Oliynyk	40	2004	2	0			
2	DF	(Ukraine)	Slyva	43	2008	12	0			
3	DF	(Ukraine)	Vynnyk	43	2008	14	0			
4	MF	(Ukraine)	Slipchenko	46	2007	24	4			
5	MF	(Ukraine)	Duchko (captain)	53	2007	17	0			
7	DF	(Ukraine)	Obrevko	42	2007	30	0			MF
8	MF	(Ukraine)	Gavrenkov	44	2007	22	0			
9	FW	(Ukraine)	Bezus	35	2007	29	3			
11	FW	(Ukraine)	Sytyla	38	2007	30	3			
13	MF	(Ukraine)	Gryshyn	39	2007	32	4			
14	FW	(Ukraine)	Karpushev	35	2008	7	0			
15	MF	(Ukraine)	Hryshanovych	38	2008	12	0			
17	DF	(Ukraine)	Voloshyn	40	2006	30	5	2009		
18	MF	(Ukraine)	Tymchenko	40	2007	27	1			
20	MF	(Ukraine)	Bashakov	40	2003	32	0			
19	FW	(Ukraine)	Kunev	36	2003	30	8			
21	MF	(Ukraine)	Aprushko	41	2007	22	2			
51	GK	(Ukraine)	Chymak	43	2008	14	0			
	MF	(Ukraine)	Klimov	39	2008	0	0			
		(Ukraine)	Hetman	38	2008	0	0			
		(Ukraine)	Kureleh	34	2008	0	0			
	DF	(Ukraine)	Kuianov	41	2008	0	0			

- Last updated: 20 July
- Source: (for number, age and since)

=== Players in / out ===
==== In ====
No.	Pos.	Nat.	Name	Age	Moving from	Type	Transfer window	Ends	Transfer fee	Source
—	MF	(Ukraine)	Klimov	22	Vorskla	On Loan	Summer			PFL.com
—		(Ukraine)	Hetman	21	Enerhiya	Transfer	Summer			PFL.com
—		(Ukraine)	Kureleh	16		Transfer	Summer			PFL.com
—	DF	(Ukraine)	Kuianov	24	Enerhiya	Transfer	Summer			PFL.com
—	GK	(Ukraine)	Chymak	25	Vorskla	Transfer	Summer			PFL.com
10	MF	(Ukraine)	Sobko	21	Helios Kharkiv	Transfer	Winter			

==== Out ====
No.	Pos.	Nat.	Name	Age	Moving to	Type	Transfer window	Transfer fee	Source
1	GK	(Ukraine)	Hrienko	31	Olmaliq FK (Uzbekistan)	Contract ended	Summer		
6	FW	(Ukraine)	Gulordava	18		Contract ended	Summer		
10	FW	(Ukraine)	Loktionov	21	Vorskla Poltava	Transfer	Summer		
14	MF	(Ukraine)	Shevchenko	20		Contract ended	Summer		
19	FW	(Ukraine)	Valeev	18		Contract ended	Summer		
22	FW	(Ukraine)	Kikot	20		Contract ended	Summer		
	FW	(Ukraine)	Kozlov	18		Contract ended	Summer		
9	FW	(Ukraine)	Bezus	18	Vorskla Poltava	Transfer	Winter		
19	FW	(Ukraine)	Kunev	18	Vorskla Poltava	Transfer	Winter		
20	MF	(Ukraine)	Bashakov	23		Released	Winter		
3	DF	(Ukraine)	Vynnyk	25		Released	Winter		
15	MF	(Ukraine)	Hryshanovych	21		Released	Winter		
13	MF	(Ukraine)	Gryshyn	21		Released	Winter		
5	MF	(Ukraine)	Dychko	36		Retired	Winter		

Last updated: 24 August 2009

=== Squad stats ===
				Total						Ukrainian Second League					Ukrainian Cup				
Country	N	P	Name	GS	A	Mins.	Gls.	Y	R	A	Mins.	Gls.	Y	R	A	Mins.	Gls.	Y	R
(Ukraine)	1	GK	Oleynuk	1	1	90				1	90								
(Ukraine)	2	DF	Slyva		1	30				1	30								
(Ukraine)	3	DF	Vynnyk	3	3	234		1		3	234		1						
(Ukraine)	4	MF	Slipchenko	3	3	270		1		3	270		1						
(Ukraine)	5	MF	Duchko	3	3	270		2		3	270		2						
(Ukraine)	7	DF	Obrevko	2	2	180				2	180								
(Ukraine)	8	MF	Gavrenkov		3	75				3	75								
(Ukraine)	9	FW	Bezus		3	63		1		3	63		1						
(Ukraine)	11	FW	Sytyla	1	3	136	1			3	136	1							
(Ukraine)	13	MF	Gryshyn	3	3	215				3	215								
(Ukraine)	14	FW	Karpushev																
(Ukraine)	15	MF	Hryshanovych		1	30				1	30								
(Ukraine)	17	DF	Voloshyn																
(Ukraine)	18	MF	Tymchenko	3	3	178	2	1		3	178	2	1						
(Ukraine)	19	FW	Kunev	3	3	237	2			3	237	2							
(Ukraine)	20	MF	Bashakov		3	40				3	40								
(Ukraine)	21	MF	Aprushko	2	2	149		1		2	149		1						
(Ukraine)	51	GK	Chymak	2	2	180				2	180								
(Ukraine)		MF	Klimov	2	3	213		1		3	213		1						
(Ukraine)		DF	Kuianov	2	3	168		1		3	168		1						
(Ukraine)			Hetman	2	3	162				3	162								
(Ukraine)			Kureleh																

Last updated: 4 August
Source: PFL.com
Ordered by number
0 shown as blank
Country: when 2 flags, 1st flag = country that plays for internationally, 2nd flag = country of birth; N = number on jersey; P = Position; Name = Name on jersey (for more extended name, pause the mouse pointer on the name); GS = Game Started; A = Appearances.

=== Disciplinary record ===
N	Pos.	Nat.	Name	Yellow card	Second yellow card	Red card	Notes
18	MF	(Ukraine)	Tymchenko	1	0	1	
7	DF	(Ukraine)	Obrevko	4	1	0	
14	MF	(Ukraine)	Hetman	4	1	0	
9	FW	(Ukraine)	Bezus	2	1	0	
5	DF	(Ukraine)	Duchko	4	0	0	
16	DF	(Ukraine)	Feshchenko	2	0	0	
22	MF	(Ukraine)	Klimov	2	0	0	
2	DF	(Ukraine)	Kureleh	1	0	0	
3	DF	(Ukraine)	Vynnyk	1	0	0	
4	MF	(Ukraine)	Slipchenko	1	0	0	
6	DF	(Ukraine)	Kuianov	1	0	0	
11	FW	(Ukraine)	Sytyla	1	0	0	
13	MF	(Ukraine)	Gryshyn	1	0	0	
21	MF	(Ukraine)	Aprushko	1	0	0	

Last updated: 2008-10-07
Source: Competitive Matches
Only competitive matches
(yellow card) = Number of bookings; (second yellow card) = Number of sending offs after a second yellow card; (red card) = Number of sending offs by a direct red card.

== Team kit ==
The team kits are produced by Puma AG and the shirt sponsor is KremenchukMiaso «Кременчукм’ясо». The home and away kit was retained from previous seasons.

Home	Away

== Club ==
=== Management ===
Position	Staff
Manager	(Ukraine) Serhiy Svystun
Assistant manager	(Ukraine) Leonid Dubdikov
Assistant manager	(Ukraine) Volodymyr Malovanets
Club doctor	(Ukraine) Vitaliy Stepanenko

Last updated: 10 July 2008
Source: Coaches

=== Other information ===
President	(Ukraine) Oleh Babaev
Director	(Ukraine) Andriy Nediak
Ground (capacity and dimensions)	Polytechnic (11,400 / )

Source: Directors

== Competitions ==
=== Overall ===
Competition	Started round	Current position / round	Final position / round	First match	Last match
Ukrainian Second League	1	—	14/34	20 July 2008	13 June 2009
Ukrainian Cup	First preliminary round	—	Second preliminary round	16 July 2008	6 August 2008

Updated to match played 21 August 2009
Source: Competitions

== Ukrainian Second League ==
Kremin's third consecutive season in Druha Liha began on 20 July 2008 and ended on 13 June 2009. Kremin finished 14th.

=== Classification ===
Pos	Team	Pld	W	D	L	GF	GA	GD	Pts	Promotion or relegation
12	Arsenal Kharkiv	34	11	10	13	36	47	−11	40 (Note: FC Arsenal Kharkiv, FC Hirnyk Kryvyi Rih, FC Dnipro-75 Dnipropetrovsk, and FC Sumy were deducted three points for non-paying the participation fees; FC Hirnyk Kryvyi Rih, FC Dnipro-75 Dnipropetrovsk, and FC Sumy were deducted additional three points for non-paying the participation fees for the second half of the season. The decision was officially declared by the Disciplinary Committee of PFL on May 28, 2009)	Withdrew
13	Hirnyk-Sport Komsomolsk	34	9	8	17	28	45	−17	35	
14	Kremin Kremenchuk	34	10	7	17	43	52	−9	34 (Note: FC Kremin Kremenchuk deducted 3 points by the Ukrainian Football Federation March 26, 2008)	
15	Metalurh-2 Zaporizhzhia	34	9	4	21	35	68	−33	31	
16	Dnipro-75 Dnipropetrovsk	34	8	6	20	28	56	−28	24	

=== Playoff game ===
Due to FC Ihroservice Simferopol failing to pay their license dues for the 2009–10 Ukrainian First League season the PFL allowed an extra team to be promoted. The PFL determined that a playoff game between the 2nd placed teams Druha Liha – Arsenal Bila Tserkva and FC Poltava.

Playoff game to determine promotion

July 12, 2009
17:00 UTC+3

Arsenal Bila Tserkva	1 – 0	FC Poltava
Derevliov 60'	Report

Central Stadium, Cherkasy
Attendance: 300
Referee: Vitaliy Hodulian (Odesa)

=== Results summary ===
Overall								Home						Away					
Pld	W	D	L	GF	GA	GD	Pts	W	D	L	GF	GA	GD	W	D	L	GF	GA	GD
34	10	7	17	43	52	−9	37	8	4	6	26	20	+6	2	3	11	17	32	−15

Last updated: 21 August 2009.
Source: Competitive Matches

=== Results by round ===
Round	1	2	3	4	5	6	7	8	9	10	11	12	13	14	15	16	17	18	19	20	21	22	23	24	25	26	27	28	29	30	31	32	33	34
Ground	H	A	H	A	H	A	H	A	H	A	H	A	H	H	A	H	A	H	A	H	H	A	H	A	H	A	H	A	H	A	A	H	A	H
Result	L	L	W	W	L	D	L	L	L	L	D	L	W	D	L	L	L	D	L	D	W	L	W	D	L	D	W	L	W	W	L	W	L	W
Position	13	15	13	9	12	12	14	14	14	14	15	15	14	14	14	14	14	15	15	15	14	15	14	14	15	15	14	15	15	14	15	14	14	14

Updated to match(es) played on 21 August 2009. Source: Competitive Matches
A = Away; H = Home; W = Win; D = Draw; L = Loss

=== Matches ===
All kickoff times are in EEST.

20 July 2008	Kremin	1–2	Yavir	Polytechnic, Kremenchuk
17:00	Tymchenko (yellow card) 5' (goal) 15'; Klimov (yellow card) 53'	(Report)	Tyechko 35' (yellow card) 40'; Peretiatko 63'; Kirienko (yellow card) 77'; Busarhin (yellow card) 82'	Attendance: 3,500; Referee: Oleksiy Moskalenko (Kryvyi Rih)

25 July 2008	Hirnyk	4–2	Kremin	Shakhta Zhovtneva, Kryvyi Rih
18:00	Berezhnyi 16', 82'; Homenko 36'; Mukan (yellow card) 59'; Hvozdevych (yellow card) 67'; Diachenko 75'	(Report)	Kunev 14', 19'; Kuianov (yellow card) 40'; Dychko (yellow card) 48'; Apryshko (yellow card) 70'	Attendance: 800; Referee: Andriy Kutakov (Brovary)

1 August 2008	Kremin	2–0	Hirnyk-Sport	Polytechnic, Kremenchuk
17:00	Tymchenko 30'; Vynnyk (yellow card) 62'; Dychko (yellow card) 63'; Bezus (yellow card) 87'; Slipchenko (yellow card) 90+1'; Sutula (yellow card) 90+2'	(Report)	Chaika (yellow card) 39' (yellow-red card) 71'; Kondrashov (yellow card) 45'; Kravchenko (yellow card) 45' (yellow-red card) 90+3'	Attendance: 4,000; Referee: Andriy Kuzmin (Mykolaiv)

10 August 2008	Metalurh-2	2–4	Kremin	Titan, Zaporizhzhia
13:00	Luchkevych (yellow card) 27'; Paziuk 33'; Khudchenko (yellow card) 43'; Luchkevych 75'	(Report)	Bezus 11'; Klimov 13'; Sutula 50', 62' (yellow card) 89'	Attendance: 150; Referee: Ihor Zhorsan (Kherson)

15 August 2008	Kremin	0–1	Zirka	Yunist, Komsomolsk
18:00	Hryshyn (yellow card) 23' (yellow-red card) 84'; Hetman (yellow card) 39'	(Report)	Korotkyi (yellow card) 29'; Medvedev (yellow card) 58'; Novytskyi 63'	Attendance: 400; Referee: Oleksandr Omelchenko (Sloviansk)

22 August 2008	Dnipro-75	1–1	Kremin	Shakhtar, Pavlohrad
17:00	Zubko 26'	(Report)	Obrevko (yellow card) 32' (yellow-red card) 76'; Klimov 84'; Dychko (yellow card) 90+2'	Attendance: 500; Referee: Volodymyr Bondar (Kharkiv)

29 August 2008	Kremin	0–1	Stal	Yunist, Komsomolsk
17:00	Hetman (yellow card) 12'; Tymchenko (red card) 55'	(Report)	Skarlosh 45' (yellow card) 62'; Shutov (yellow card) 55'	Attendance: 300; Referee: Vitaliy Diadenko (Kirovohrad)

5 September 2008	Tytan Armyansk	5–1	Kremin	Khimik, Armyansk
17:00	Mukhamadeev 20'; Riabchenko (yellow card) 33'; Petrochenko 40'; Shelest 62'; Kretov 86'; Stoliarchuk 90+3'	(Report)	Kunev 45+2'; Feshchenko (yellow card) 47'	Attendance: 1,400; Referee: Oleksandr Pavliuk (Kyiv)

12 September 2008	Kremin	0–2	Arsenal	Yunist, Komsomolsk
17:00	Klimov (yellow card) 40'; Obrevko (yellow card) 55'; Bezus (yellow card) 69' (yellow-red card) 89'	(Report)	Abdulmedzhydov (yellow card) 33'; Volha 53' (yellow card) 22' (yellow-red card) 72'; Stepanchuk 67'; Shatilov (yellow card) 69'; Shulha (penalty missed)	Attendance: 150; Referee: Andriy Lisakovskyi (Odesa)

18 September 2008	Shakhtar	1–0	Kremin	N.I. Horiushkin, Sverdlovsk
16:00	Lukashov 32' (pen.); Kolesnik (yellow card) 77'; Loboiko (yellow card) 83'	(Report)	Obrevko (yellow card) 23'	Attendance: 2,000; Referee: Vadym Nesterenko (Donetsk)

24 September 2008	Kremin	1–1	Olimpik	Yunist, Komsomolsk
16:00	Kureleh (yellow card) 58'; Obrevko (yellow card) 65'; Sutula 90'	(Report)	Ulanov (yellow card) 20'; Khomytov 75'	Attendance: 200; Referee: Ivan Tokarenko (Mykolaiv)

28 September 2008	Shakhtar-3	1–0	Kremin	Shakhtar Sports Base Kirsha, Donetsk
17:00	Voznyuk 70'; Peredystyi (yellow card) 86'; Holikov (yellow card) 90+1'	(Report)	Dychko (yellow card) 32'; Feshchenko (yellow card) 75'; Hetman (yellow card) 90+1'	Attendance: 50; Referee: Kostiantyn Trukhanov (Kharkiv)

4 October 2008	Kremin	2–1	Sevastopol-2	Yunist, Komsomolsk
15:00	Sutula 22', 51'; Hetman (yellow card) 72'	(Report)	Prokopenko 31'; Vyshniakov (yellow card) 47'	Attendance: 100; Referee: Volodymyr Bondar (Kharkiv)

10 October 2008	Kremin	1–1	Olkom	Yunist, Komsomolsk
15:00	Tymchenko 65' (yellow card) 90+2'; Obrevko (yellow card) 81'; Kunev (yellow card) 84'	(Report)	Kovalenko (yellow card) 64'; Poperezhai (yellow card) 76'; Yakovenko (yellow card) 85'; Reutskyi (red card) 88'; Savchenko 90+4'	Attendance: 100; Referee: Andriy Kuzmin (Mykolaiv)

16 October 2008	Illichivets-2	2–0	Kremin	Azovets, Mariupol
15:00	Kovaliov 3'; Melnyk 6'; Reutskyi (yellow card) 68' (yellow-red card) 74'	(Report)	Slipchenko (yellow card) 8'; Obrevko (yellow card) 51'; Klimov (yellow card) 66'; Sutula (yellow card) 75'; Vynnyk (yellow card) 86'	Attendance: 200; Referee: Oleksandr Holovkov (Sievierodonetsk)

24 October 2008	Kremin	0–2	Poltava	Yunist, Komsomolsk
14:00	Bezus (yellow card) 5'; Hetman (yellow card) 9' (yellow-red card) 53'; Bashakov (yellow card) 90+3'	(Report)	Honcharenko 36'; Berbat (yellow card) 38' (goal) 55'; Horbanenko (yellow card) 69'	Attendance: 200; Referee: Serhiy Skyrda (Kharkiv)

31 October 2008	Tytan Donetsk	1–0	Kremin	Smolianka, Donetsk
14:00	Hulivatyi 35' (pen.)	(Report)	Apryshko (yellow card) 76'	Attendance: 200; Referee: Vitaliy Romanov (Dnipropetrovsk)

7 November 2008	Sumy	1–1	Kremin	Kolos, Sumy
14:00	Romanov 43'; Busarhin (yellow card) 53' (yellow-red card) 57'; Matlash (yellow card) 69'; Lebedenko (yellow card) 79'	(Report)	Hetman (yellow card) 86'; Obrevko 90+2'	Attendance: 200; Referee: Artem Nozdrachov (Kharkiv)

14 November 2008	Kremin	2–4	Hirnyk	Yunist, Komsomolsk
14:30	Kunev 38'; Obrevko (yellow card) 54'; Bezus 81' (pen.)	(Report)	Platonov 29' (yellow card) 73'; Chernov 35'; Kozak (yellow card) 67'; Berezhnyi 74' (pen.), 87'	Attendance: 100; Referee: Oleksandr Ivanov (Makiivka)

11 November 2008	Hirnyk-Sport	1–1	Kremin	Yunist, Komsomolsk
13:00	Sharko (yellow card) 34'; Shalak 90+1'	(Report)	Dychko (yellow card) 28'; Feshchenko (yellow card) 61'; Bezus 75'	Attendance: 300; Referee: Kateryna Monzul (Kharkiv)

26 November 2008	Kremin	2–1	Metalurh-2	Yunist, Komsomolsk
13:00	Bezus 17' (pen.); Klimov 43'; Hetman (yellow card) 49'	(Report)	Morozov 10'; Maliuk (yellow card) 19'; Khudchenko (yellow card) 67'; Sydorchuk (yellow card) 75'	Attendance: 50; Referee: Serhiy Prystupa (Kyiv)

4 April 2009	Zirka	3–1	Kremin	Zirka, Kirovohrad
14:00	Novytskyi 29'; Danchenko 44'; Yakovenko 53' (pen.); Kyrnevych (yellow card) 55'	(Report)	Klimov 69'; Voloshyn (yellow card) 82'	Attendance: 4,000; Referee: Mykola Kryvonosov (Kyiv)

11 April 2009	Kremin	3–0	Dnipro-75	Polytechnic, Kremenchuk
14:00	Voloshyn 45'; Sumtsov (yellow card) 46'; Klimov 56'; Kirienko (yellow card) 85'	(Report)	Kaznokha (yellow card) 20'; Vasylenko (yellow card) 40'; Yaremenko (yellow card) 65'	Attendance: 2,000; Referee: Oleksandr Omelchenko (Sloviansk)

17 April 2009	Stal	1–1	Kremin	Metalurh, Dniprodzerzhynsk
16:00	Polunytsky 25'; Borhun (yellow card) 60'; Leshko (yellow card) 73'	(Report)	Sumtsov (yellow card) 71' (yellow-red card) 73'; Tymchenko 75'; Hetman (yellow card) 90+4'	Attendance: 1,000; Referee: Andriy Kuzmin (Mykolaiv)

22 April 2009	Kremin	2–3	Tytan Armyansk	Polytechnic, Kremenchuk
16:00	Sutula 57'; Kirienko 69'; Chernomor (yellow card) 78'	(Report)	Stoliarchuk (yellow card) 36'; Bezdolnyi 45', 76' (pen.), 87'	Attendance: 1,500; Referee: Oleksandr Sydorchuk (Vinnytsia)

26 April 2009	Arsenal	3–3	Kremin	Arsenal-Bavaria, Kharkiv
16:00	Draholiuk 32'; Emelianov (yellow card) 33'; Chernikov 52'	(Report)	Sumtsov 24'; Kuianov (yellow card) 38'; Sobko (yellow card) 45'; Apryshko 58'; Obrevko 68' (o.g.); Borsh 84'	Attendance: 800; Referee: Maksym Kozyriats'kyi (Zaporizhzhia)

2 May 2009	Kremin	2–1	Shakhtar	Polytechnic, Kremenchuk
16:00	Obrevko 2'; Apryshko 40' (pen.); Chernomor (yellow card) 76' (yellow-red card) 86'	(Report)	Lubenets 15'; Radevych (yellow card) 69'; Seroi (yellow card) 71'	Attendance: 2,500; Referee: Kostiantyn Trukhanov (Kharkiv)

9 May 2009	Olimpik	2–0	Kremin	Olimpik, Donetsk
15:00	Khomchenovskyi 40' (pen.); Valiaev (yellow card) 45+1'; Shavrin (yellow card) 48' (goal) 51'	(Report)	Apryshko (yellow card) 12'; Chumak (yellow card) 48'	Attendance: 200; Referee: Oleksiy Moskalenko (Kryvyi Rih)

16 May 2009	Kremin	4–0	Shakhtar-3	Polytechnic, Kremenchuk
16:00	Klimov 11', 53'; Kovalenko 37'; Chumak (yellow card) 77'; Nemchenko 80'	(Report)		Attendance: 2,000; Referee: Kostiantyn Trukhanov (Kharkiv)

20 May 2009	Sevastopol-2	w/o	Kremin	Kolos, Sevastopol
		[ (Report)]

24 May 2009	Olkom	2–1	Kremin	Spartak, Melitopol
16:00	Taranukha 26'; Vorobiov (yellow card) 36'; Savchenko (yellow card) 63'; Dzhandzhhava (yellow card) 85' (goal) 87'	(Report)	Kirienko (yellow card) 33'; Sumtsov (yellow card) 62'; Stepanchuk 90+2'	Attendance: 1,000; Referee: Ihor Paskhal (Kherson)

30 May 2009	Kremin	2–0	Illichivets-2	Polytechnic, Kremenchuk
16:00	Sobko 42'; Stepanchuk 63'	(Report)	Ivashchenko (yellow card) 66'	Attendance: 2,500; Referee: Oleksandr Pavliuk (Kyiv)

7 June 2009	Poltava	2–1	Kremin	Lokomotiv, Poltava
18:00	Berbat (yellow card) 9' (goal) 70'; Borzenko (yellow card) 10'; Marchenko 36'; Poltavets (yellow card) 43'; Vitoshynskyi (yellow card) 82'	(Report)	Hryshyn (yellow card) 44'; Feshchenko (yellow card) 50'; Klimov 72' (yellow card) 89'; Chumak (yellow card) 89'	Attendance: 1,200; Referee: Makola Kryvonosov (Kyiv)

13 June 2009	Kremin	2–0	Tytan Donetsk	Polytechnic, Kremenchuk
18:00	Kirienko 38'; Borsh 39'	(Report)	Kozachenko (yellow card) 40'; Skydan (yellow card) 62'	Attendance: 3,500; Referee: Kateryna Monzul (Kharkiv)

Win Tie Loss

== Ukrainian Cup ==
=== First preliminary round ===
16 July 2008
18:00

Kremin	w/o	Bukovyna
	(Report)

Polytechnic, Kremenchuk

=== Second preliminary round ===
6 August 2008
17:00

Kremin	1–1 (a.e.t.)	Komunalnyk
Klimov (penalty missed); Obrevko (yellow card) 45+1'; Sutula 90+2'; Apryshko (yellow card) 105'	(Report)	Diachenko (yellow card) 4'; Vizyonok (yellow card) 11' (goal) 45'; Rotan (yellow card) 37'; Malyi (yellow card) 69'; Shepkovskyi (yellow card) 118'
Penalties
Hetman (penalty missed); Apryshko (penalty scored); Kunev (penalty missed); Obrevko (penalty scored)	2–4	Kudinov (penalty scored); Kovhan (penalty scored); Bondarenko (penalty scored); Danaev (penalty scored)

Polytechnic, Kremenchuk
Attendance: 3,000
Referee: Oleksandr Ivanov (Makiivka)

=== Disciplinary record ===
N	Pos.	Nat.	Name	Yellow card	Second yellow card	Red card	Notes
7	DF	(Ukraine)	Obrevko	1	0	0	
21	MF	(Ukraine)	Apryshko	1	0	0	

Last updated: 29 September 2009
Source: Competitive matches
Only competitive matches
(yellow card) = Number of bookings; (second yellow card) = Number of sending offs after a second yellow card; (red card) = Number of sending offs by a direct red card.
