= Oleksii Khyzhniak =

Oleksii Khyzhniak may refer to:

- Oleksii Khyzhniak (footballer) (born 2001), Ukrainian professional footballer
- Oleksii Khyzhniak (soldier), Ukrainian soldier, Hero of Ukraine (2023, posthumously)
