= Dychko =

Dychko is a surname. Notable people with the surname include:

- Ivan Dychko (born 1990), Kazakh boxer
- Lesia Dychko (born 1939), Ukrainian music educator and composer
- Volodymyr Dychko (born 1972), Ukrainian footballer
