= Oleksiejczuk =

Oleksiejczuk is a Polish patronymic surname of Ukrainian origin derived from the Ukrainian given name Oleksiy and East Slavic patronymic suffix -chuk. It may be transliterated as Oleksiejchuk. Variant: Aleksijczuk. Ukrainian-language counterparts: Oleksiychuk, Aleksiychuk (Russianized). Notable people with the surname include:

- Michał Oleksiejczuk (born 1995), Polish mixed martial artist
