= Oleh Kovalenko =

Ukrainian footballer

Personal information
- Full name: Oleh Kovalenko
- Date of birth: 11 April 1988 (age 38)
- Place of birth: Ukrainian SSR, USSR
- Position: Winger

Youth career
- 2001–2003: Chornomorets Odesa
- 2003–2005: Obriy Nikopol
- 2005: Dnipro Dnipropetrovsk

Senior career*
Years	Team	Apps	(Gls)
2006	Helios Kharkiv	19	(3)
2008	Pärnu Vaprus	16	(5)
2009	Kremin Kremenchuk	4	(1)
2009	Dnister Ovidiopol	6	(0)
2010	Kremin Kremenchuk	11	(0)
2010–2011	Yednist Plysky	15	(4)
2011	Nyva Ternopil	9	(3)
2013–2014	Real Pharm Ovidiopol	37	(4)
2016	FC Yeremiivka		
2018	Real Pharma Odesa	9	(0)
- * Club domestic league appearances and goals

Oleh Kovalenko (born 11 April 1988) is a Ukrainian former professional footballer. He plays the position of midfielder or striker. His former clubs include FC Helios Kharkiv, FC Dnister Ovidiopol and FC Pärnu Vaprus in Estonian Meistriliiga.

He scored his first Meistriliiga goal on 30 August 2008, in the 22nd minute of a 1–2 loss against JK Maag Tammeka Tartu.
