= Maksym Sutula =

Ukrainian footballer

Personal information
- Full name: Maksym Hryhorovych Sutula
- Date of birth: 10 December 1987 (age 38)
- Place of birth: Chornobai, Ukrainian SSR
- Height: 1.86 m (6 ft 1 in)
- Position: Striker

Youth career
- CYSS Chornobai

Senior career*
Years	Team	Apps	(Gls)
2007–2010	Kremin	71	(13)
Total		71	(13)
- * Club domestic league appearances and goals as of 25 September 2009

Maksym Hryhorovych Sutula (Ukrainian: Максим Григорович Сутула; born 10 December 1987) is a Ukrainian football striker.

== Club history ==
Dmytro Zayko began his football career in CYSS Chornobai in Chornobai. He signed with FC Kremin Kremenchuk during 2007 summer transfer window.

== Career statistics ==
As of 25 September 2009

Club	Season	League		Cup		Total	
Club	Season	Apps	Goals	Apps	Goals	Apps	Goals
Kremin	2006–07	11	3	0	0	11	3
Kremin	2007–08	30	3	2	2	30	3
Kremin	2008–09	30	7	1	1	30	7
Kremin	2009–10	0	0	0	0	0	0
Kremin	Total	71	13	3	3	74	16
Career	Total	71	13	3	3	74	16
