= Oleksiy Sofiyenko =

Ukrainian poet (1952–2011)

Oleksiy Andriyovych Sofiyenko (Ukrainian: Софієнко Олексій Андрійович; September 12, 1952 – June 7, 2011) was a Ukrainian poet, member of the National Union of Writers of Ukraine, recipient of several literary awards.
