= Valeriy Kureliekh =

Ukrainian footballer

Personal information
- Full name: Valeriy Yuriovych Kureliekh
- Date of birth: 12 August 1991 (age 35)
- Place of birth: Kremenchuk, Ukrainian SSR
- Height: 1.86 m (6 ft 1 in)
- Position: Centre back

Youth career
- 2005–2008: Kremin Kremenchuk

Senior career*
Years	Team	Apps	(Gls)
2008–2009	Kremin Kremenchuk	43	(0)
2010–2013	Vorskla Poltava	1	(0)
2014–2016	Kremin Kremenchuk	67	(1)
2017	Hirnyk-Sport	19	(0)
2018	Kremin Kremenchuk	13	(0)
2020–2022	Kremin Kremenchuk	39	(2)
2022–2023	Poltava	5	(0)
2023–2024	Viktoriya Sumy	20	(1)
- * Club domestic league appearances and goals as of 1 January 2025

Valeriy Yuriovych Kureliekh (Ukrainian: Валерій Юрійович Курелєх; born 12 August 1991 in Kremenchuk, Poltava Oblast, Ukrainian SSR) is a Ukrainian football defender.

== Club history ==
Kureliekh is the product of the Sportive School of Kremin Kremenchuk.

Valeriy Kureliekh began his football career in Kremin-91 in Kremenchuk. He signed with FC Kremin Kremenchuk during the 2008 summer transfer window.

He made his debut for the main FC Vorskla team as a substitute in the second half in a match against Karpaty Lviv in the Ukrainian Premier League on 1 December 2012.

== Career statistics ==
As of 15 June 2023

Appearances and goals by club, season and competition
Club	Season	League			Cup		Other		Total	
Club	Season	Division	Apps	Goals	Apps	Goals	Apps	Goals	Apps	Goals
Kremin	2008–09	Ukrainian Second League	28	0	—		—		28	0
Kremin	2009–10	Ukrainian Second League	15	0	1	0	—		16	0
Kremin	Total		43	0	1	0	—		44	0
Vorskla reserves	2009–10	Ukrainian Premier League youth championship	—		—		—		—	
Vorskla reserves	2010–11	Ukrainian Premier League Reserves	—		—		—		—	
Vorskla reserves	2011–12	Ukrainian Premier League Reserves	—		—		—		—	
Vorskla reserves	2012–13	Ukrainian Premier League Reserves and Under 19	—		—		—		—	
Vorskla reserves	Total		—		—		—		—	
Vorskla	2012–13	Ukrainian Premier League	1	0	—		—		1	0
Vorskla	Total		1	0	—		—		1	0
Kremin	2013–14	Ukrainian Second League	11	0	—		—		11	0
Kremin	2014–15	Ukrainian Second League	18	0	2	0	2 (Note: Appearances in Promotion/relegation play-off)	0	24	0
Kremin	2015–16	Ukrainian Second League	20	1	1	0	—		21	1
Kremin	2016–17	Ukrainian Second League	18	0	1	1	—		19	1
Kremin	Total		67	1	4	1	2	0	73	2
Hirnyk-Sport	2016–17	Ukrainian First League	8	0	—		—		8	0
Hirnyk-Sport	2017–18	Ukrainian First League	11	0	1	0	—		12	0
Hirnyk-Sport	Total		19	0	1	0	—		20	0
Kremin	2017–18	Ukrainian First League	5	0	—		—		5	0
Kremin	2018–19	Ukrainian First League	8	0	1	0	—		9	0
Kremin	2019–20	Ukrainian First League	10	0	—		—		10	0
Kremin	2020–21	Ukrainian First League	19	2	2	0	—		21	2
Kremin	2021–22	Ukrainian First League	10	0	1	0	—		11	0
Kremin	Kremin total		162	3	9	1	2	0	173	4
SC Poltava	2022–23	Ukrainian First League	5	0	—		—		5	0
SC Poltava	Total		5	0	0	0	—		5	0
Career total			187	3	10	1	2	0	199	4
