= Oleksii Kot =

Ukrainian lawyer (born 1977)

Oleksii Oleksandrovych Kot OPYW
- Born: December 30, 1977 (age 48); Kyiv, Ukrainian SSR, USSR
- Citizenship: Ukraine
- Education: Doctor of Law
- Alma mater: Taras Shevchenko National University of Kyiv
- Occupations: Legal scholar, lawyer, professor
- Title: Director, Institute of Lawmaking and Legal Expertise of the National Academy of Sciences of Ukraine
- Awards: Honored Lawyer of Ukraine

Oleksii Oleksandrovych Kot (born 30 December 1977, Kyiv) is a Ukrainian legal scholar and practitioner. He is a Doctor of Law, professor, Honored Lawyer of Ukraine, a corresponding member of the National Academy of Legal Sciences of Ukraine, and the director of the Institute of Lawmaking and Scientific-Legal Expertise of the National Academy of Sciences of Ukraine.

== Biography ==
=== Education ===
In 1999, he graduated with honors from the Faculty of Law at Taras Shevchenko National University of Kyiv. He then studied at the postgraduate program of the Institute of International Relations, Taras Shevchenko National University of Kyiv, specializing in civil law, civil procedure, family law, and private international law.

=== Academic and Professional Career ===
In 2002, he defended his Candidate’s dissertation on "Transfer of creditor’s rights to third parties in civil law of Ukraine". In 2017, he defended his Doctoral dissertation on "Problems of exercise and protection of subjective civil rights". He was awarded the Professor title in 2020.

He has taught civil law and private international law at Taras Shevchenko National University of Kyiv and worked at the National Academy of Legal Sciences of Ukraine.

Since 2021, he has been the director of the Institute of Lawmaking and Scientific-Legal Expertise of the National Academy of Sciences of Ukraine. Practicing lawyer since 1999, senior partner at Antika Law Firm, specializing in commercial, corporate, and international arbitration law.

He has been listed in The Best Lawyers in Ukraine for litigation.

=== Publications ===
Kot is the author/co-author of 200+ scientific works, including monographs, textbooks, encyclopedic publications, code commentaries, and articles.

Selected works:

- Transfer of Creditor’s Rights: History, Theory, Legislation (2002)
- Exercise and Protection of Subjective Civil Rights: Theory and Practice (2017)
- Competition Law of Ukraine (2021)
- Recodification of Civil Legislation of Ukraine (co-author, 2021–2022)
- Legal Support for Post-War Recovery of Ukraine (co-author, 2025)

== Public and expert activity ==
Kot is a member of Council on Judicial Reform (2014–2019). Member of scientific advisory councils to the Chairman of the Verkhovna Rada of Ukraine, Constitutional Court of Ukraine, and Supreme Court of Ukraine.

Deputy Head of the Working Group on the Recodification (Updating) of Ukrainian Civil Legislation (established by Resolution No. 260 of the Chairman of the Verkhovna Rada of Ukraine, dated 28 July 2020). Co-author of the Draft Civil Code of Ukraine (Draft Law No. 15150).

Co-author of bill №6013 (repeal of Commercial Code).

== Awards ==
- Honored Lawyer of Ukraine (2016)
- Yaroslav the Wise Prize (2020)
- Certificate of Honor of the Verkhovna Rada of Ukraine (2025)
- Gratitude of the Supreme Court (2020)
- Certificate of Honor of the Supreme Court (2023)
