= Eduard Hulordava =

Ukrainian footballer

Eduard Hulordava Едуард Гулордава
Personal information
- Full name: Eduard Erosiyovych Hulordava; Едуард Еросійович Гулордава
- Date of birth: 11 December 1989 (age 36)
- Place of birth: Kremenchuk, Soviet Union
- Height: 1.83 m (6 ft 0 in)
- Position: Defender

Team information
- Current team: FC Kremin Kremenchuk
- Number: 6

Senior career*
| Years | Team | Apps | (Gls) |
| 2005–2006 | Atlant-Vagonobudivelnik-Kremin | | |
| 2006–2008 | FC Kremin Kremenchuk | 22 | (0) |
- * Club domestic league appearances and goals

Eduard Hulordava (Ukrainian: Едуард Гулордава; born on 11 December 1989) is a retired Ukrainian footballer who played as a defender for Atlant-Vagonobudivelnik-Kremin in 2005 and for FC Kremin Kremenchuk in the Druha Liha B franchise from 2006 to 2008.
