= Oleksii Dniprov =

Ukrainian politician (born 1982)

- Олексій Сергійович Дніпров
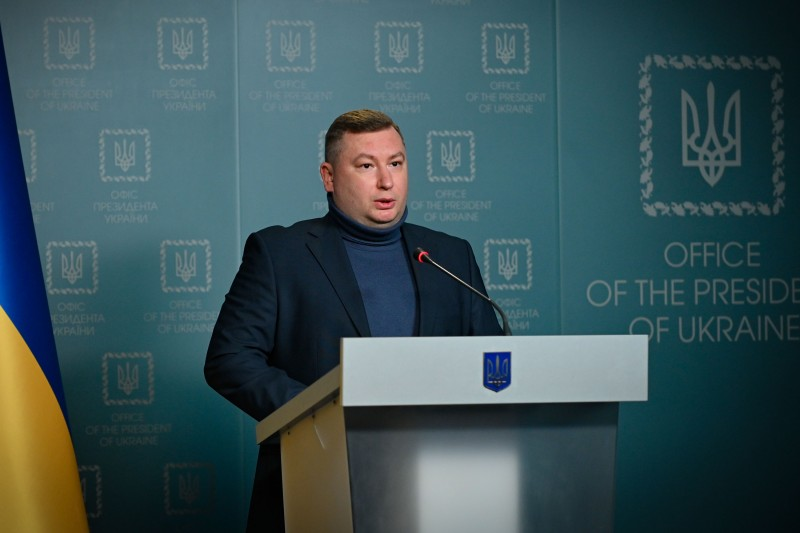

Deputy Head of the Office of the President of Ukraine
- In office July 9, 2021 – March 29, 2024
- President: Volodymyr Zelenskyy
- Succeeded by: Olena Kovalska

Personal details
- Born: 25 February 1982 (age 44) Kyiv, Ukrainian SSR
- Education: Taras Shevchenko National University of Kyiv; National University Odesa Law Academy
- Occupation: politician, statesman

Oleksii Dniprov (Ukrainian: Олексій Сергійович Дніпров; born 25 February 1982, Kyiv) is a Ukrainian politician and statesman. From 9 July 2021 to 29 March 2024, he was a Deputy Head of the Office of the President of Ukraine.

== Early life ==
Oleksii Dniprov was born in Kyiv, Ukraine.

He graduated from the Academy of Labor and Social Relations of the Federation of Trade Unions of Ukraine (2003), specialist in law, Taras Shevchenko National University of Kyiv with a degree in “Public Law", "Finance and Credit”, National University Odesa Law Academy with a degree in “Intellectual Property”.

== Career ==
From April 1998 to November 2002, he was the chairman of the board of the Youth Public Organization “Rights for All”.

From July 2003 to April 2004, he was a senior consultant, from April 2004 to February 2005, he was the chief consultant of the secretariat of the Committee on Freedom of Speech and Information, Apparatus of the Verkhovna Rada of Ukraine.

From May 2003 to February 2005, he was an expert of the Public Council on Freedom of Speech and Information of the International Renaissance Foundation.

From February to September 2005, he was the head of the service of the Deputy Prime Minister of Ukraine for humanitarian and social issues.

From September 2005 to January 2011, he was the head of the Department of Humanitarian Policy, from January 2011 to January 2013, he was the director of the Department of Expertise of the Secretariat of the Cabinet of Ministers of Ukraine.

From January to April 2013, he was Deputy Minister — Chief of Staff of the Ministry of Education and Science, Youth and Sports of Ukraine. From April 2013 to February 2015, he was the Deputy Minister — Chief of Staff of the Ministry of Education and Science of Ukraine.

From February 2015 to April 2016, he was the Deputy Head of the Administration of the President of Ukraine.

From April 2016 to July 2021, he was the head of the Administration Apparatus (Office) of the President of Ukraine.

From July 2021 to March 2024, he was the Deputy Head of the Office of the President of Ukraine. He was replaced by Olena Kovalska.

== State activity ==
Oleksii Dniprov is the head of the Commission under the President of Ukraine on citizenship issues (since August 12, 2019).

He is the deputy chairman of the State Awards and Heraldry Commission (since August 13, 2019).

He is the head of the Commission under the President of Ukraine on pardons (since August 21, 2019).

== Awards ==
He is a Recipient of the Honorary Diploma of the Cabinet of Ministers of Ukraine (December 2009).

In June 2012, Oleksii Dniprov received the Order of Merit III degree.
