= Oleksandr Feshchenko =

Ukrainian football defender

Personal information
- Full name: Oleksandr Mykhailovych Feshchenko
- Date of birth: 2 January 1985 (age 41)
- Place of birth: Ukraine
- Height: 1.74 m (5 ft 8 1/2 in)
- Position: Defender

Team information
- Current team: FC Tiraspol
- Number: 17

Youth career
- 2001–2002: RVUFC Kyiv

Senior career*
Years	Team	Apps	(Gls)
2006–2008	Nafkom	58	(1)
2008–2009	Kremin	29	(0)
2009–2010	Iskra-Stal	33	(0)
2011–	Tiraspol	41	(0)
- * Club domestic league appearances and goals as of 30 September 2012

Oleksandr Mykhailovych Feshchenko (Ukrainian: Олександр Михайлович Фещенко; born 2 January 1985) is a Ukrainian football defender currently playing for Moldovan National Division club FC Tiraspol.

== Club history ==
Oleksandr Feshchenko began his football career in RVUFC in Kyiv. He signed with Iskra-Stal during 2009 summer transfer window.

== Career statistics ==
As of 28 September 2009

Club	Season	League		Cup		Europe		Total	
Club	Season	Apps	Goals	Apps	Goals	Apps	Goals	Apps	Goals
Nafkom	2005–06	10	0	0	0	0	0	10	0
Nafkom	2006–07	22	1	1	0	0	0	23	1
Nafkom	2007–08	23	0	2	0	0	0	25	0
Nafkom	2008–09	3	0	1	0	0	0	4	0
Nafkom	Total	58	1	4	0	0	0	62	1
Kremin	2008–09	29	0	0	0	0	0	29	0
Kremin	Total	29	0	0	0	0	0	29	0
Iskra-Stal	2009–10	5	0	0	0	2	0	7	0
Iskra-Stal	Total	5	0	0	0	2	0	7	0
Career	Total	92	1	4	0	2	0	98	1
