= Oleksii Tiunin =

- Олексій Тюнін
- Born: Tallinn, Estonia
- Military career
- Allegiance: Ukraine
- Branch: Ukrainian Armed Forces
- Service years: 2022–2024
- Nickname: Dukh
- Units: Right Sector Ukrainian Volunteer Corps (2022); 3rd Separate Assault Brigade (2023–2024)
- Conflicts: Russo-Ukrainian War: Battle of Bakhmut (2023); 2023 Ukrainian counteroffensive
- Other work: Captain of the Ukrainian national team at the 2025 Invictus Games Co-founder of the NGO “Gentlemen”

Oleksii Viacheslavovych Tiunin (Ukrainian: Олексій В’ячеславович Тюнін), callsign Dukh (Spirit), is a Ukrainian serviceman, veteran of the Russo-Ukrainian War, and captain of the Ukrainian national team at the 2025 Invictus Games. From 2023 to 2024, he served in the 1st Mechanized Battalion of the 3rd Assault Brigade. He is a co-founder of the non-governmental organization “Gentlemen”, which focuses on veteran rehabilitation through adaptive sports.

== Biography ==
Oleksii Tiunin was born in Tallinn, Estonia. At the age of 4, he moved with his parents to Ukraine, to the village of Katerynivka in Kharkiv Oblast, where he attended school.

In 2004, he enrolled in an automotive-road technical college. From 2007 to 2008, he served his mandatory military service in the 95th Separate Air Assault Brigade. In 2008, he moved to Kharkiv, where he worked in trade.

During the full-scale Russian invasion of Ukraine, in May 2022, he volunteered to join the Right Sector Ukrainian Volunteer Corps and underwent training. After completing training, he served in the Alliance Division unit. In the spring of 2023, he applied for a transfer to the 3rd Assault Brigade, and in the summer, he joined its 1st Mechanized Battalion. On August 19, 2023, around 9:00 AM, during a combat mission near the village of Andriivka (Donetsk Oblast), he sustained gunshot wounds to his leg. Evacuation was impossible due to shelling; he remained on the battlefield with a tourniquet for 8 hours. He lost his leg and underwent treatment, rehabilitation, and prosthetics.

After his injury, he adapted to a prosthesis and began engaging in adaptive sports. He learned about the Invictus Games from a friend at a prosthetic center and initially submitted an application skeptically (choosing swimming).

== Participation in the Invictus Games ==
In February 2025, he was elected captain of the Ukrainian national team for the first winter Invictus Games in Vancouver and Whistler (Canada, February 8–16, 2025). The team (35 participants) competed in traditional and winter sports; Tyunin participated in wheelchair basketball (winning the first game). He was elected captain by vote for his motivation.

== Social activity ==
He is a co-founder of the NGO “Gentlemen” (together with Oleksandr Androshchuk). The organization focuses on veteran rehabilitation through adaptive sports (wheelchair rugby, wheelchair rugby league). The “Gentlemen” team held its first training on April 1, 2025, and played a match on April 5 (winning in the Super League).
