= Oleksiy Kartunov =

Ukrainian political scientist (born 1940)

Oleksiy Vasyliovych Kartunov
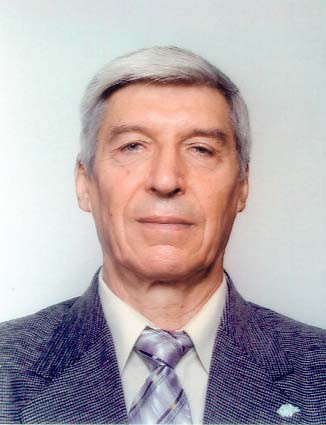
- Oleksiy Vasyliovych Kartunov (born 1940)
- Born: April 30, 1940 (age 86); Novo-Romanovka, Arzgir district, Stavropolskyi region, USSR
- Citizenship: Ukraine
- Education: Kyiv University
- Awards: Honorary Mention from the President of Ukraine (2000) Certificate of Honor from the Verkhovna Rada of Ukraine (2002); Badge “Outstanding worker of Education of Ukraine” (2000); Medal “Petro Mohyla” (2007) Title “Honoured Scholar of Ukraine” (2010)
- Scientific career
- Fields: Political science, Ethnopolitics, Nationalism

Oleksiy Vasyliovych Kartunov (Ukrainian: Олексій Васильович Картунов, romanized: Oleksii Vasylovych Kartunov; Russian: Алексей Васильевич Картунов; born April 30, 1940) is a Ukrainian political scientist. He earned a Doctor of Political Science. He is a member of the Ukrainian Academy of Political Science.

== Early life ==
Kartunov was born on March 30, 1940, in the Novo-Romanovka village of Arzgirskyi district, Stavropol region. His father Vasyl Arkhipovych Kartunov was a communal farm shepherd who died in 1942, fighting in World War II. His mother Tetiana Ivanivna Sulymenko worked as a communal farm milkmaid.

His childhood was spent in a small multi-ethnic village by the Terek River (near Mozdok, Northern Ossetia).

Oleksiy began working as a shepherd at age 12 because of his family's strained circumstances. At 15 he started working as a loader at a brick plant, while studying at evening school. Afterwards he took a position of a technician at “Stavropolnaftobud” (urban-type village Zaterechnyi of the Neftekumsk district, Stavropol region).

From 1959 until 1962, he served in the Soviet army.

In 1967, he graduated from historical-philosophical faculty of Kyiv University, as an “Historian-international relations expert and lecturer of social science with the right to teach in English”.

== Career ==
He was selected for diplomatic work in the United Arab Republic. Due to the Arab-Israeli war, however, he was redirected to the Department of Science Relations with the foreign countries of the Presidium of the Academy of Sciences of the USSR. Until 1969 he worked on the issue of foreign scientists’ acceptance to academic organizations.

Beginning in 1969, he attended graduate school and worked as a junior research scientist at the Institute of History of the USSR Academy of Sciences, where he successfully defended his dissertation.

In 1977, he was invited to teach in the Kyiv Institute of Trade and Economics where he worked for 10 years as a senior lecturer and assistant professor. In 1987, he accepted a position at the Institute of Further Training for social science lecturers of Kyiv University.

During the 1991-1996 period, he served as chairman of KROK's History Department and the Donbas State Engineering Academy. Shortly after, he received an invitation to the University of Economics and Law “KROK” (Kyiv) where he established and took lead of the Social Sciences Department. In 2003, he began an “International Information” major, established the International Information Department, becoming and remaining its head.

His dissertation defense of “Western ethnonational and ethnopolitical concepts: theoretic-methodological analysis” was in V.M. Koretsky Institute of State and Law of National Academy of Sciences of Ukraine (1996). He worked as a researcher and a lecturer in universities of Great Britain, Poland, Russia, the United States, Germany, the Czech Republic and other countries.

== Scholarly activities ==
He is the author and coauthor of nearly 550 publications (monographs, encyclopedias, textbooks, manuals, articles) on issues of politics, ethnopolitical sciences, information society, research methodology, etc. In 1985, he published in English the book Enemies of peace and democracy.

At the end of the 1980s, Kartunov participated in development of “the Transformation of Humanitarian Education in Ukraine" Program at the order of the Ministry of Higher and Specialized Secondary Education (MHSSE) of the Ukrainian SSR. He received an MHSSE of Ukrainian SSR honorary mention for developing and implementing a “Political Science” educational course into the curriculum of Ukrainian universities (1990).

He is considered a founder of political science in Ukraine and the coauthor of the first study guide on this subject (Political science. Course of lections. – K., 1991). He is also considered a founder of the new scholarly direction and major “ethnopolitology," acknowledged by the Higher Attestation Commission (HAC) of Ukraine, as well as the author of the first Ukrainian study guides and educational courses’ group on this subject (Fundamentals of ethnopolitology. Notes of lectures of special course – K., 1992; Introduction to ethnopolitology – K., 1999; Western concepts of ethnicity, nation and nationalism – K., 2007). In 1999 he was nominated as a laureate of the Ukrainian State Science and Technology Award.

Kartunov is a member of scientific-expert board of socio-economic development issues of Cabinet of Ministers of Ukraine. He remains a member of specialized scientific councils on doctorate and candidate dissertations' defense, namely: the National Academy of Public Administration of the President of Ukraine, Yuriy Fedkovych Chernivtsi National University, V.M. Koretsky Institute of State and Law of National Academy of Sciences of Ukraine, the National Pedagogical Dragomanov University. He is a member of editorial board of the following magazines: Scientific Bulletin of Diplomatic Academy of Ukraine, Political Management, NaUKMA Scientific Notes. Series: Political sciences, etc.

== Recognition ==
- Honorary Mention from the President of Ukraine (2000)
- Certificate of Honor from the Verkhovna Rada of Ukraine (2002)
- Outstanding worker of Education of Ukraine” (2000)
- Petro Mohyla (2007)
- Favorite Lecturer at KROK University, awarded by students’ poll
- Honoured Scientist of Ukraine (2010)
