= Oleksiy Popov =

Ukrainian futsal player

Olexiy Popov
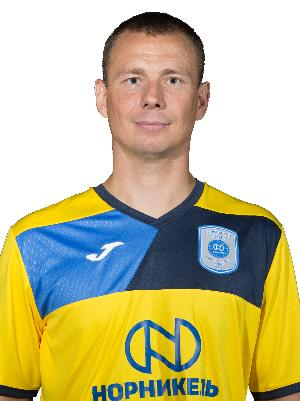

Personal information
- Date of birth: 6 March 1980 (age 46)
- Place of birth: Zaporizhzhia, USSR
- Height: 1.83 m (6 ft 0 in)
- Position: Goalkeeper

Team information
- Current team: Norilsk Nickel (assistant)

Youth career
- FC Metalurh Zaporizhzhia

Senior career*
Years	Team	Apps	(Gls)
1997	FC Metalurh Zaporizhzhia	0	(0)
1997–1999	Winner Ford-Universytet Zaporizhia		(0)
1999–2001	Zaporizhkoks		(0)
2001–2005	Shakhtar Donetsk		(0)
2005–2013	Dinamo Moskva	143	(2)
2013–2014	Dina Moscow	0	(0)
2014	→ Araz Naxçivan (loan)	16	(0)
2014–2018	Norilsk Nickel	81	(1)

International career
2000–2005	Ukraine	?	(0)

Managerial career
- 2018–: Norilsk Nickel (assistant)
- * Club domestic league appearances and goals

Olexiy Mykolayovych Popov (Ukrainian: Олексій Миколайович Попов; born 6 April 1980) is a Ukrainian professional futsal coach and former player. He was a member of the Ukrainian national futsal team.

== Career ==
Popov was a football player in his youth. Popov attended the Metalurh Zaporizhzhia Youth school system. He began his professional career in 1997 for FC Metalurh Zaporizhzhia, but then turned to futsal. Popov played for the Winner Ford-Universytet Zaporizhia. In 1999 – 2001 he was part of futsal club Zaporizhkoks. In 2001, he moved to the Shakhtar Donetsk. In 2005 Popov went to Russia, where he later played for the Dinamo Moskva, Dina Moscow, and Norilsk Nickel. In April 2008, Dinamo Moskva participated in the final games of the UEFA Futsal Cup. Olexiy helped the team to win the tournament and to get the title of the strongest team of Europe.

In the Ukrainian national futsal team Olexiy Popov was twice a silver medalist of UEFA Futsal Championship, in 2001 and 2003.

In August 2002, Olexiy became a member of a student team at the Student World Cup.

In the end of 2004, Popov as a part of the national team took part in the World Cup of his career.

On 25 May 2018, Popov announced his retirement at the age of 38.

After the end of his playing career, he was appointed assistant coach to Evgenii Kuksevich at Norilsk Nickel.

On 26 October 2020, he received the UEFA Futsal B Diploma.

== Honours ==
=== Player ===
Winner Ford-Universytet

- Ukrainian Men's Futsal Cup: 1998/99

Shakhtar

- Ukrainian Men's Futsal Championship: 2001–02, 2003–04, 2004–05
- Ukrainian Men's Futsal Cup: 2002–03, 2003–04

Dinamo

- Russian Futsal Super League (6): 2005–06, 2006–07, 2007–08, 2010–11, 2011–12, 2012–13
- Russian Futsal Cup: 2007–08, 2008–09, 2009–10, 2010–11, 2012–13
- UEFA Futsal Cup: 2006–07

Araz

- Azerbaijan Futsal Premier League: 2013–14

Ukraine

- UEFA Futsal Championship runner-up: 2001, 2003

Individual

- Best goalkeeper of Ukrainian League: 2001–02

=== Assistant ===
Norilsk Nickel

- Russian Futsal Cup: 2019–20
