= Oleksii Gnatkovskyi =

Ukrainian stage actor born 1985)

- Олексій Гнатковський
- Born: November 9, 1985 (age 40); Ivano-Frankivsk, Ukraine
- Education: Vasyl Stefanyk Precarpathian National University
- Occupations: Actor, theatre director
- Known for: Leading roles in Ukrainian theatre productions
- Awards: Merited Artist of Ukraine (2014) People's Artist of Ukraine (2024)

Oleksii Ivanovych Hnatkovskyi (Ukrainian: Олексій Іванович Гнатковський; born November 9, 1985) is a Ukrainian stage actor, theatre director and cultural manager, General Director and Artistic Director of the Ivano‑Frankivsk National Academic Drama Theatre named after Ivan Franko. He is known for his work in contemporary Ukrainian drama and for reinterpreting Ukrainian classical literature for the stage. Hnatkovskyi has been recognised with the titles of Merited Artist of Ukraine and People's Artist of Ukraine.

== Biography ==
Oleksii Hnatkovskyi was born in Ivano‑Frankivsk in what was then the Ukrainian Soviet Socialist Republic. He studied acting at the Faculty of Culture and Arts of the Ivan Franko National University of Lviv, one of the key centres for theatre education in western Ukraine. During his student years he took part in amateur and student productions and became involved with regional cultural initiatives, which later influenced his interest in theatre as a public institution and space for civic dialogue.

== Stage career ==
After graduating, Hnatkovskyi joined the Ivano‑Frankivsk Academic Regional Ukrainian Music and Drama Theatre named after Ivan Franko, where he has worked as an actor since the late 1990s. Over time the theatre was granted national status and became the Ivano‑Frankivsk National Academic Drama Theatre; Hnatkovskyi's career developed in parallel with this institutional transformation. At the theatre he has performed in a wide repertoire that combines Ukrainian classics, contemporary dramaturgy and world drama. Among his notable stage roles are parts in productions based on works by Ivan Franko, Taras Shevchenko, Lesia Ukrainka and modern Ukrainian playwrights, as well as adaptations of foreign authors for the Ukrainian stage. Critics have noted his ability to move between psychological drama, satire and tragicomedy, often portraying characters whose personal stories reflect broader social conflicts or historical traumas. In addition to his work in Ivano‑Frankivsk, Hnatkovskyi has appeared as a guest actor in projects in other Ukrainian cities and has participated in theatre festivals in Ukraine and abroad.

== Directing and theatre management ==
Alongside his acting career, Hnatkovskyi has directed several productions, often focusing on re‑reading Ukrainian literary classics and recent Ukrainian plays in contemporary theatrical language. His staging has been described as dynamic and visually expressive, incorporating elements of physical theatre, multimedia and non‑traditional use of the auditorium space. In the 2020s, Hnatkovskyi was appointed General Director and Artistic Director of the Ivano‑Frankivsk National Academic Drama Theatre, combining administrative and artistic responsibilities. In this role he has advocated for expanding the theatre's repertoire, developing educational programmes for young audiences and strengthening international cooperation, including touring and co‑productions. Under his leadership, the theatre has staged productions that engage with themes of Ukrainian history, identity and the experience of war, and has taken part in national initiatives to support internally displaced persons and communities affected by the Russian invasion of Ukraine.

== Awards and honours ==
- Merited Artist of Ukraine (Zasluzhene mystetske zyvannya) – state honorary title for outstanding contribution to the performing arts.
- People's Artist of Ukraine (Narodnyi artist Ukrainy) – one of the highest national titles in Ukraine for artists, awarded for exceptional achievements in theatre and other performing arts.
- Laureate of regional and national theatre awards for acting and directing, including prizes at Ukrainian theatre festivals.

== Filmography and theatre credits table ==
Year	Title	Role / function	Medium
2004	Work at the Ivano-Frankivsk Drama Theatre (beginning)	ballet artist; member of supporting staff (start of work)	theatre (career fact)
2006	Work at the Ivano-Frankivsk Drama Theatre (reference entry)	actor/director; working at the theatre since 2006	theatre (career fact)
2014	Decree on awarding theatre employees	honorary title “Merited Artist of Ukraine” (for O. Hnatkovskyi)	state distinction
2017	All Quiet on the Western Front	stage director (debut)	theatre
2019	Decision of the Vitalii Smoliak Prize Commission	laureate in the nomination “directorial work” for All Quiet on the Western Front	award (theatre)
2019	Twelfth Night, or WHAT You Will!!!	directing work (according to theatre profile)	theatre
2020	Twelfth Night, or What You Will	Ivano-Frankivsk Theatre production — included in the list of winners/laureates of “GRA”-2020 (connection to his direction confirmed by theatre profile)	theatre / festival
2022	Matchmaking at Honcharivka	directing work (according to theatre profile)	theatre
2023	Dovbush	Ivan Dovbush (acting role)	cinema
2024	National Film Award (eighth ceremony)	winner in the category “Best Supporting Actor” for Dovbush	award (cinema)
2024	Decree No. 772/2024	honorary title “People's Artist of Ukraine”	state distinction
2024	Start of production of the second season of Coffee with Cardamom	actor in the leading cast; start of production, release planned for 2025	television series (production)
2025	Coffee with Cardamom. The Power of the Land	Stefan Terletskyi (actor)	television series
2025	The Traitors	host (first experience in the reality genre — according to his comment)	streaming / reality
2025	Voice-over of stops in municipal transport	announcer / voice of stop announcements for Elektroavtotrans	voice work / city project
2026	Academy Awards on Suspilne Kultura	pre-show host and commentator of the Ukrainian broadcast	television broadcast (hosting/commentary)
—	Roles in productions of the Ivano-Frankivsk Drama Theatre (list in profile)	acting roles in repertoire (without premiere dates in the profile: Ivan Synytsia, Hamlet, Aeneas, Friar Lorenzo, etc.)	theatre
