= Oleksiy Kazakov =

Ukrainian footballer

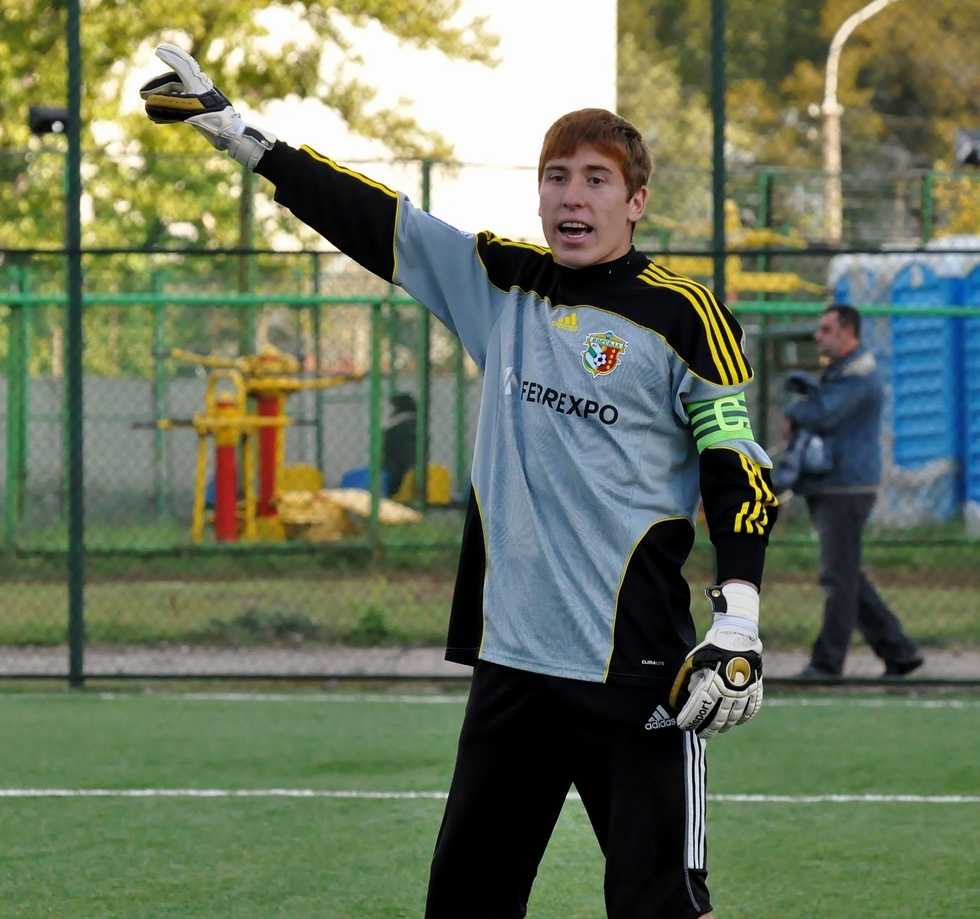

Personal information
- Full name: Oleksiy Olehovych Kazakov
- Date of birth: 22 February 1990 (age 36)
- Place of birth: Mariupol, Ukrainian SSR
- Height: 1.85 m (6 ft 1 in)
- Position: Goalkeeper

Senior career*
| Years | Team | Apps | (Gls) |
| 2010–2014 | Vorskla Poltava | 6 | (0) |
| 2015 | Bystrzyca Kąty Wrocławskie | 11 | (0) |
| 2015–2016 | Olimpia Kowary | 2+ | (0) |
| 2016–2017 | FSV 63 Luckenwalde | 0 | (0) |
| 2017 | Olimpia Kowary | 10 | (0) |
| 2018 | Karkonosze Jelenia Góra | | |
| 2019–2022 | Olimpiya Savyntsi | 53 | (0) |
| 2022 | Concordia Elbląg | 1 | (0) |
| 2023 | Loviisa | 21 | (0) |
| 2024 | Futura | 22 | (0) |
- * Club domestic league appearances and goals as of 22 February 2025

Oleksiy Olehovych Kazakov (Ukrainian: Олексій Олегович Казаков, born 22 February 1990) is a Ukrainian professional footballer who last played as a goalkeeper for Finnish club Futura.

== Career ==
Kazakov is not a product of any sporting school and only played for amateur teams, before signing a contract with FC Vorskla in February 2010.

He made his debut playing for Vorskla Poltava in the Ukrainian Premier League in a match against Kryvbas Kryvyi Rih on 4 March 2012.

On 6 September 2022, after spending three-and-a-half years at Olimpiya Savyntsi, he returned to Poland to join III liga side Concordia Elbląg.
