= Stanislav Peredystyi =

Ukrainian footballer

Personal information
- Full name: Stanislav Yuriyovych Peredystyi
- Date of birth: 17 September 1989 (age 37)
- Place of birth: Dniprodzerzhynsk, Ukrainian SSR
- Height: 1.75 m (5 ft 9 in)
- Position: Defender

Team information
- Current team: Viktoriya Mykolaivka
- Number: 14

Youth career
- 1998: Kontynent-Prometei Dniprodzerzhynsk
- 1998–2000: SILKO Verkhnyodniprovsk
- 2001–2002: Stal Dniprodzerzhynsk academy
- 2001: Ikar Dniprodzerzhynsk
- 2002–2006: Shakhtar Donetsk academy

Senior career*
Years	Team	Apps	(Gls)
2006–2009	Shakhtar Donetsk	0	(0)
2006	→ Stal-2 Dniprodzerzhynsk (loan)	1	(0)
2006–2009	→ Shakhtar-3 Donetsk (loan)	76	(1)
2009–2011	Stal Dniprodzerzhynsk	32	(2)
2011–2013	Avanhard Kramatorsk	19	(0)
2013	Stal-2 Dniprodzerzhynsk	2	(0)
2014	Olimpik Petrykivka	17	(1)
2015	Kolos Zachepylivka	32	(0)
2015–2017	Naftovyk-Ukrnafta Okhtyrka	61	(2)
2018	SC Dnipro-1	9	(1)
2018–2021	Inhulets Petrove	14	(1)
2019–2020	→ VPK-Ahro Shevchenkivka (loan)	23	(0)
2021–	Viktoriya Mykolaivka	0	(0)
- * Club domestic league appearances and goals as of 26 July 2021

Stanislav Peredystyi (Ukrainian: Станіслав Юрійович Передистий; born 17 September 1989 in Dniprodzerzhynsk, Ukrainian SSR) is a professional Ukrainian football defender who plays for Viktoriya Mykolaivka. He is the product of the Stal Kamianske and Shakhtar Donetsk school systems.

In July 2018 Peredystyi signed for Inhulets.

Stanislav's father Yuriy Petrovych Peredystyi in 1980s played for Metalurh Dniprodzerzhynsk.
