= Oleksandr Obrevko =

Ukrainian footballer

Oleksandr Obrevko Олександр Обревко
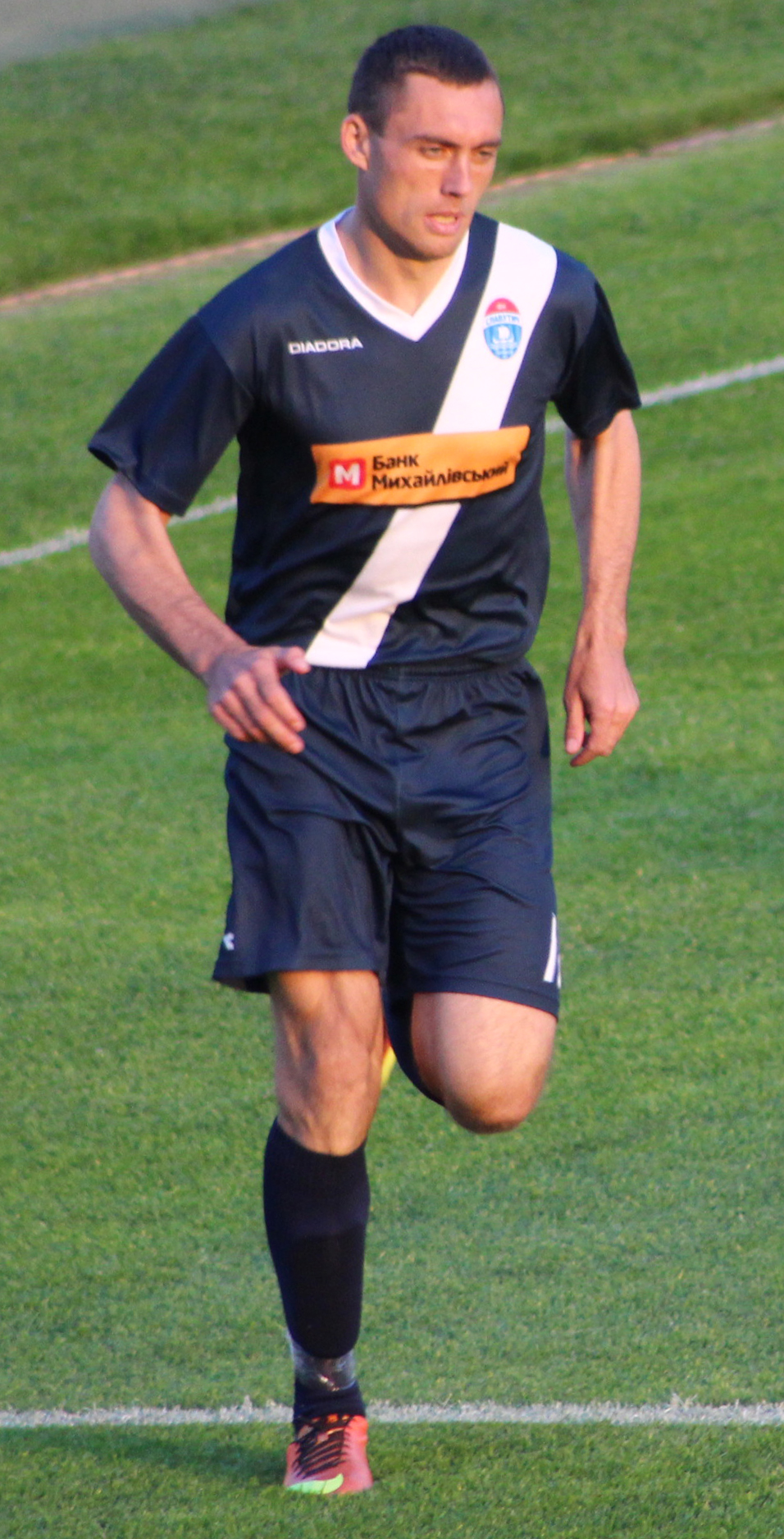
- Oleksandr Obrevko

Personal information
- Full name: Oleksandr Anatoliyovych Obrevko
- Date of birth: 31 May 1984 (age 42)
- Place of birth: Frunzivka, Reshetylivka Raion, Poltava Oblast, Ukrainian SSR, Soviet Union (now Kapustiany, Poltava Raion, Poltava Oblast, Ukraine)
- Height: 1.80 m (5 ft 11 in)
- Position: Midfielder

Senior career*
Years	Team	Apps	(Gls)
2007–2009	Kremin Kremenchuk	71	(2)
2009–2011	Stal Dniprodzerzhynsk	42	(4)
2011–2012	Poltava	38	(2)
2013	Poltava-2 Karlivka	8	(1)
2013–2014	Slavutych Cherkasy	26	(0)
- * Club domestic league appearances and goals

Oleksandr Anatoliyovych Obrevko (Ukrainian: Олександр Анатолійович Обревко; born 31 May 1984) and is a Ukrainian retired professional footballer who played as a midfielder.

== Club history ==
He has played for Kremin Kremenchuk in the Druha Liha B since 2007.
