= Oleksiy Ivanovich Poroshenko =

Ukrainian businessman and son of president (1936–2020)

Oleksiy Poroshenko
- Олексі́й Пороше́нко
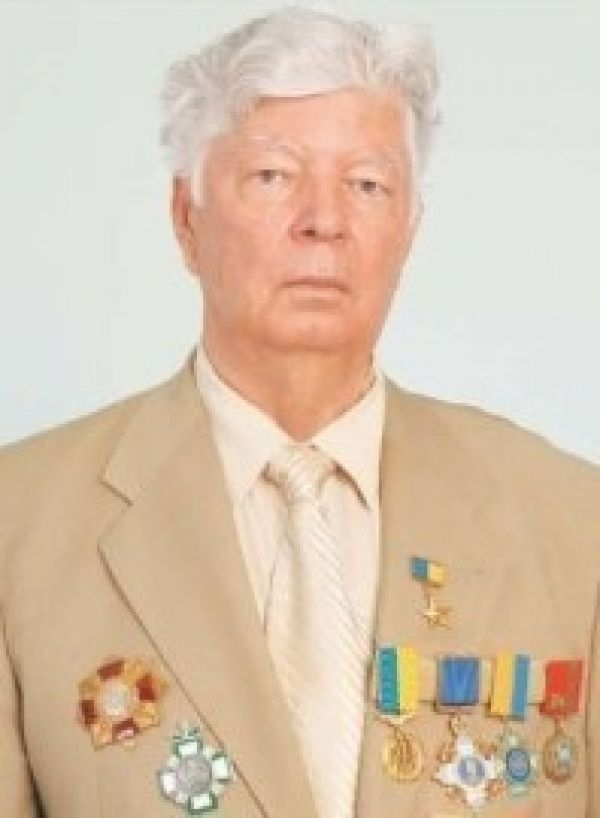
- Poroshenko in 2020

Deputy of the Vinnytsia Oblast Council
- In office April 27, 2006 – November 11, 2010

Personal details
- Born: 11 June 1936 Safyany, Ismail County, Kingdom of Romania
- Died: 16 June 2020 (aged 84) Kyiv, Ukraine
- Children: 2, including Petro
- Occupation: Engineer; politician

Oleksiy Ivanovych Poroshenko (Ukrainian: Олексі́й Іва́нович Пороше́нко; 11 June 1936 – 16 June 2020) was a Soviet and Ukrainian economic and political figure who was the father of the fifth president of Ukraine, Petro Poroshenko.

== Early life and career ==
Oleksiy was born on 11 June 1936, in the village of Safyany, Izmail County, into the family of Romanian citizen Ivan Evdokimovich Poroshenko. In 1959 he graduated from the Lviv Agricultural Institute specializing in mechanical engineering for the mechanization of labor-intensive processes in agriculture. After graduating, from 1959 to 1974, he worked in the city of Bolgrad in the Odesa Oblast as the chief engineer of the Bolgrad regional association of agricultural machinery.

== Career in Moldova ==
From 1974, he worked at the Bender Research, Experimental, and Repair Plant in Tighina (Moldavian Soviet Socialist Republic, now known as Bender and under de facto control of the unrecognized breakaway state Transnistria). He held the position of plant director from September 26, 1977, to December 1, 1983.

Since 1983, he worked in Tiraspol as the head of the specialized mobile mechanized column of the Moldselkhozmontazh trust.

On November 29, 1985, Poroshenko was arrested by the Bender City Police Department of the Ministry of Internal Affairs for theft of property on an especially large scale. An arrest warrant was issued on December 2, 1985. He was also accused of illegally possessing a weapon. Poroshenko spent the next six months of pretrial detention in the Bender pretrial detention center. On July 20, 1986, Poroshenko was convicted by the Criminal Cases Collegium of the Supreme Court of the Moldavian SSR to 5 years' imprisonment in a general regime correctional labor colony. Poroshenko's criminal record was overturned early by an amnesty for workshop workers on June 18, 1987 (he was released on August 21 of that year).

== Move back to Ukraine ==
In 1992, due to the Transnistrian War, he moved to Kiev, where his youngest son, Petro, was studying in graduate school at Taras Shevchenko National University of Kyiv. That same year, he became deputy general director of "Exchange House Ukraine", and in 1993, he became deputy general director of CJSC Ukrainian Industrial and Investment Concern (Ukrprominvest concern). Petro Poroshenko was general director of both. After Petro was elected to the Verkhovna Rada of Ukraine in 1998, Poroshenko became the CEO of Ukrprominvest.

In the early 2000s, Oleksiy Poroshenko and his son Petro took up agriculture, starting with the Kryzhopol Sugar Factory. He was a Deputy of the Vinnytsia Oblast Council from 2006 to 2010 from the Our Ukraine party. He was a member of the standing committee on issues of the agro-industrial complex. In the 2012 Ukrainian parliamentary election, he was a candidate for People's Deputy of Ukraine in district No. 16, but in September, by decision of his family, he stopped participating in the election race. On June 15, 2020, Poroshenko suffered a hemorrhagic stroke, from which he died in Kyiv the following day, June 16. He was buried at the Zverinetskoye Cemetery.

== Family ==
His wife was Evgeniya Sergeyevna Poroshenko (née Grigorchuk; February 21, 1937 – 2004), originally from the village of Kugurlui-Matroska (now Izmail Raion of Odesa Oblast).

His eldest son, Mykhailo (August 28, 1957 – August 25, 1997), was one of the founders of the company "Ukrprominvest" and died in 1997 in a car accident under unclear circumstances. His youngest son, Petro, born on September 26, 1965, was the president of Ukraine from 2014 to 2019.

== Awards ==
- Order of the Badge of Honour
- Medal "For Distinguished Labor"
- Jubilee Medal "In Commemoration of the 100th Anniversary of the Birth of Vladimir Ilyich Lenin"
- Honored Worker of Agriculture of Ukraine (July 26, 2001)
- Order of Prince Yaroslav the Wise, 5th degree (January 18, 2007)
- Hero of Ukraine (June 23, 2009)
