= Oleksiy Prytulyak =

Ukrainian footballer

Personal information
- Date of birth: 12 January 1989 (age 37)
- Place of birth: Zhytomyr, Ukrainian SSR
- Height: 1.77 m (5 ft 9 1/2 in)
- Position: Midfielder

Team information
- Current team: Olimpia Elbląg II

Youth career
- 2002–2003: Polissya Zhytomyr
- 2003–2004: RVUFK Kyiv
- 2005–2006: Shakhtar Donetsk

Senior career*
Years	Team	Apps	(Gls)
2006–2007	Shakhtar Donetsk	0	(0)
2006–2007	→ Shakhtar-3 Donetsk	10	(0)
2007–2008	Dnipro Cherkasy	15	(0)
2009	Dnepr Mogilev	0	(0)
2009	Nyva Ternopil	2	(0)
2009–2010	Skala Stryi	10	(0)
2010	Tavriya Simferopol	0	(0)
2011	Prykarpattya Ivano-Frankivsk	2	(0)
2011–2012	Stal Dniprodzerzhynsk	17	(2)
2012	Sumy	14	(0)
2013	Stal Dniprodzerzhynsk	11	(0)
2014	Legion Zhytomyr	4	(1)
2014	Pyatykhatska Volodymyrivka	2	(0)
2015	Lesovuk-Podillya Kirnasovka	1	(0)
2015–2018	Chełmianka Chełm	60+	(25+)
2018	Elana Toruń	0	(0)
2018	Fakel Lypovets	10	(7)
2019–2020	Olimpia Elbląg	32	(4)
2020–2021	Chełmianka Chełm	34	(2)
2021	Rubikon Kyiv	8	(0)
2022–2023	Zorya Romaniv	13	(3)
2023–2024	VIVAD Romaniv	37	(10)
2024–2025	Kolos Polonne	28	(6)
2025–2026	Marcovia Marki	5	(0)
2026	LKS Promna	13	(1)
2026–	Olimpia Elbląg II	0	(0)
- * Club domestic league appearances and goals as of 14:36, 23 July 2026 (UTC)

Oleksiy Prytulyak (Ukrainian: Олексій Притуляк; born 12 January 1989) is a Ukrainian professional footballer who plays as a midfielder for Polish club Olimpia Elbląg II.

== Honours ==
Chełmianka Chełm

- IV liga Lublin: 2016–17
- Polish Cup (Lublin regionals): 2015–16, 2016–17, 2020–21
- Polish Cup (Chełm regionals): 2015–16, 2016–17
