= Yevhen Shevchenko =

Ukrainian footballer

Personal information
- Full name: Yevhen Volodymyrovych Shevchenko
- Date of birth: 16 October 1987 (age 39)
- Place of birth: Dniprodzerzhynsk, Soviet Union
- Height: 1.87 m (6 ft 2 in)
- Position: Striker

Senior career*
| Years | Team | Apps | (Gls) |
| 2007 | FC Kremin Kremenchuk | 11 | (0) |
- * Club domestic league appearances and goals

Yevhen Shevchenko (Ukrainian: Євген Шевченко; born 16 October 1987 in Dniprodzerzhynsk) is a Ukrainian football striker. He is 1.87 m (6 ft 2 in) tall. He weighs 72 kg (159 lb).

== Club history ==
He played for FC Kremin Kremenchuk in the Ukrainian Second League during 2007.
