= Oleksii Kulahin =

Ukrainian politician and Honored Builder of Ukraine

Oleksii Kulagin
- Олексій Кулагін
- Born: April 7, 1955 (age 71); Kurakhove, Donetsk region, Ukrainian SSR
- Citizenship: Ukraine
- Education: Komunar Mining and Metallurgical Institute
- Occupation: Construction developer
- Employer: LLC OMOX
- Known for: Member of the Board of Directors of the Confederation of Builders of Ukraine
- Title: Director

Oleksii Kulagin (born April 7, 1955, Kurakhove, Donetsk region) is a Ukrainian entrepreneur and managing owner of the development company OMOX.

== Early life ==
Oleksii Kulagin was born on April 7, 1955, in the city of Kurakhove, Donetsk region.

== Education ==
In 1981, he graduated from the Komunar Mining and Metallurgical Institute with a degree in Civil Engineering. In 1989, he defended a dissertation on “Foundations and Substructures, earning the degree of Candidate of Technical Sciences” (equivalent to Ph.D.).

== Career ==
From 1981 to 1992, he worked within the LuhanskShakhtBud. Starting in 1986, he was the First Deputy Head of the Stakhanovshakhtobud trust. In May 1986, he led a team of mine construction workers in the aftermath of the Chernobyl disaster. He later organized housing construction for resettled individuals from the Chornobyl exclusion zone (in the city of Slavutych and the villages of Nadra and Savarka).

In December 1988, he led a rescue team in Leninakan and Spitak after the Spitak earthquake in Armenia. In December 1988, he led a team of rescuers in the cities of Gyumri and Spitak following the earthquake in Armenia, and from January 1989 to 1991, he headed a team of 7,500 mine builders involved in the reconstruction of the housing stock in the city of Vanadzor. From 1992 to 1998, he served as General Director of CJSC LuhanskShakhtBud. From 2003 to 2004, he worked as deputy head of the Regional Main Office in Luhansk. In November 2003, he took the civil servant's oath, receiving the 11th rank of the 5th category. In 2004, he became General Director of LLC Transservice-Invest.

Since 2005, he has co-founded and led of the development company OMOX, which has developed the largest condominium in Europe – the Chaika residential complex. From 2015 to 2018, Oleksii Kulagin served as a Deputy of Kyiv Region Parliament. He reportedly served on the Committee for Budget and Finance.

== Charity ==
In 2008, Oleksii Kulagin helped establish the children's football club Chaika at the Chaika residential complex and contributed to building modern sports facilities. Since 2012, he has supported the annual Mundial futsal tournament, and since 2015, he has sponsored the CHAYKA-CUP tennis tournament and has been the patron of the Chaika Has Talent contest.

In 2018, he collaborated with the communal enterprise Sviatoshyn Forestry and Park Management to create a new park zone in the Kyiv region's Bucha district, including a skate zone, a children’s playground, walking paths, and recreational areas. The park covers an area of 2 hectares.

In 2022, during the Russian active military invasion in Kyiv region, he provided food support to the National Police of Ukraine, Territorial Defence Forces, and security personnel. He also purchased bulletproof gear to enhance their safety in defending the area. In 2024, he supported the construction of shelters and barracks for the training center of the 241st Separate Brigade of the Territorial Defense Forces of the Armed Forces of Ukraine.
