= Oleksiy Khomin =

Ukrainian Nordic combined skier (born 1990)

Oleksiy Khomin (born 21 August 1990) is a Ukrainian Nordic combined skier. He competed in the FIS Nordic World Ski Championships 2009 in Liberec. He came at the 51st place in the Mass start and 53rd in the Gundersen Normal Distance Race. He has competed in the B World Cup (now called Continental cup) since 2007. He has also competed in three Junior World Championships, but without any great results. Khomin has also competed in the Junior Ski Jumping World Championships.

== See Also ==
- Russians in Ukraine
