= Vadym Hetman (footballer) =

Ukrainian association football player

Personal information
- Full name: Vadym Valeryovych Hetman
- Date of birth: July 14, 1987 (age 39)
- Place of birth: Ukrainian SSR, Soviet Union
- Position: Defender

Senior career*
Years	Team	Apps	(Gls)
2004–2008	FC Enerhiya Yuzhnoukrainsk	72	(2)
2008–2009	MFC Kremin Kremenchuk	28	(0)
2009–2010	FC Ros Bila Tserkva	19	(1)
2010–2011	Desna Chernihiv	15	(0)
2011	FC Nyva Vinnytsia	19	(0)
2012	Desna Chernihiv	7	(0)
2013–2016	FC Arsenal Bila Tserkva	80	(9)
2016–2017	FC Arsenal Kyiv	20	(0)
2018–2019	FC Ukraine United		
- * Club domestic league appearances and goals as of December 10, 2018

Vadym Hetman (born July 14, 1987) is a Ukrainian footballer who played as a defender.

== Playing career ==
Hetman began his professional career in 2004 in the Ukrainian Second League with FC Enerhiya Yuzhnoukrainsk. He later played with MFC Kremin Kremenchuk, FC Ros Bila Tserkva, and Desna Chernihiv. In 2011, he played in the Ukrainian First League with FC Nyva Vinnytsia, and the following season returned to the Ukrainian Second League to play with Desna Chernihiv, and FC Arsenal Bila Tserkva. In 2016, he featured once more in the Ukrainian First League with FC Arsenal Kyiv. In 2018, he played abroad in the Canadian Soccer League with FC Ukraine United. In his debut season in Toronto he assisted in securing the First Division title.
