= Vyacheslav Horbanenko =

Ukrainian footballer

Personal information
- Full name: Vyacheslav Oleksandrovich Horbanenko
- Date of birth: 22 February 1984 (age 42)
- Place of birth: Kryvyi Rih, Ukrainian SSR
- Height: 1.79 m (5 ft 10 1/2 in)
- Position: Midfielder

Youth career
- 1998–2003: Kryvbas Kryvyi Rih

Senior career*
Years	Team	Apps	(Gls)
2003–2006	Kryvbas Kryvyi Rih	1	(0)
2003–2004	→ Kryvbas-2 Kryvyi Rih	28	(0)
2005	→ Zirka Kirovohrad (loan)	4	(0)
2005–2006	→ Kryvbas-2 Kryvyi Rih	25	(1)
2006	Zakarpattia Uzhhorod	2	(0)
2007–2008	Torpedo Zhodino	37	(3)
2008	Poltava	9	(3)
2009	Minsk	25	(2)
2010	Sumy	5	(3)
2011	Belshina Bobruisk	27	(1)
2012	Poltava	5	(0)
2012–2013	Zirka Kirovohrad	30	(4)
2013–2014	UkrAhroKom Holovkivka	13	(0)
2014	Metalurh Kryvyi Rih		
- * Club domestic league appearances and goals

Vyacheslav Horbanenko (Ukrainian: В'ячеслав Олександрович Горбаненко; born 22 February 1984) is a former Ukrainian professional footballer.
