= Artem Hryshyn =

Ukrainian footballer

Personal information
- Full name: Artem Oleksandrovych Hryshyn
- Date of birth: 1 February 1987 (age 39)
- Place of birth: Poltava, Ukrainian SSR
- Height: 1.76 m (5 ft 9 in)
- Position: Midfielder

Youth career
- 2002–2003: Almaz Poltava
- 2003–2004: Vorskla Poltava

Senior career*
Years	Team	Apps	(Gls)
2004–2007	Vorskla Poltava	0	(0)
2004–2005	→ Vorskla-2 Poltava	17	(2)
2007–2008	Kremin Kremenchuk	50	(4)
2008–2010	Poltava	20	(0)
2010–2011	Stal Kraśnik		(0)
2011–2012	Shakhtar Sverdlovsk	38	(5)
- * Club domestic league appearances and goals

Artem Oleksandrovych Hryshyn (Ukrainian: Артем Олександрович Гришин; born 16 October 1987) and is a Ukrainian football midfielder.

== Club history ==
Before the transfer he played for FC Vorskla Poltava. He wore a jersey number 33.
