= Oleksii Khyzhniak (soldier) =

Ukrainian soldier

Hero of Ukraine Oleksii Khyzhniak
- Олексій Хижняк

Personal details
- Born: Oleksii Leonidovych Khyzhniak; 1989
- Died: September 7, 2022 (aged 32–33)

Military service
- Allegiance: Ukraine
- Branch/service: Armed Forces of Ukraine
- Rank: Captain
- Battles/wars: Russo-Ukrainian War
- Awards: Order of Bohdan Khmelnytsky; Order for Courage

Oleksii Leonidovych Khyzhniak (Ukrainian: Олексій Леонідович Хижняк; 1989 – September 7, 2022) was a Ukrainian soldier, captain of the Armed Forces of Ukraine, a participant in the Russian-Ukrainian war. Hero of Ukraine (2023, posthumously).

== Biography ==
In September 2022, Captain Oleksii Khyzhniak group captured an enemy checkpoint and stopped the enemy column, destroying equipment and personnel. During the battle, Khyzhniak was mortally wounded.

== Awards ==
- The title of Hero of Ukraine with the Order of the Golden Star (8 July 2023, posthumously)
- Order of Bohdan Khmelnytsky, 3rd class (17 November 2022, posthumously)
- Order for Courage, 3rd class (9 April 2015)
