= Oleksii Bashakov =

Ukrainian footballer

Oleksiy Bashakov Олексій Башаков
Personal information
- Full name: Oleksiy Oleksandrovuch Bashakov
- Date of birth: 3 January 1988 (age 38)
- Place of birth: Kremenchuk, Soviet Union
- Height: 1.75 m (5 ft 9 in)
- Position: Midfielder

Team information
- Current team: FC Kremin Kremenchuk
- Number: 20

Youth career
- 2001–2005: "Atlant-Kremez" Kremenchuk

Senior career*
Years	Team	Apps	(Gls)
2005–	FC Kremin Kremenchuk		
- * Club domestic league appearances and goals

Oleksiy Bashakov (Ukrainian: Олексій Башаков; born 3 January 1988, in Kremenchuk, Ukraine) and is a Ukrainian football midfielder. He is 175 centimeters tall (6'0") and weighs 61 kilograms (165.3 pounds).

== Club history ==
He has played for FC Kremin Kremenchuk in the Druha Liha B franchise since 2005. He also played for "Atlant-Kremez" Kremenchuk club.
