= Volodymyr Dychko =

Ukrainian footballer (born 1972)

Personal information
- Full name: Volodymyr Viktorovych Dychko
- Date of birth: 7 September 1972 (age 54)
- Place of birth: Komsomolske, Ukrainian SSR
- Height: 1.70 m (5 ft 7 in)
- Position: Defender

Youth career
- 1989–1990: Metalist Kharkiv

Senior career*
Years	Team	Apps	(Gls)
1990–1992	Olympik Kharkiv	60	(1)
1993	SBTS Sumy	2	(0)
1993–1995	Kremin Kremenchuk	57	(0)
1995–1999	Vorskla Poltava	93	(8)
1997–1999	→ Vorskla-2 Poltava	7	(0)
2000	Elektron Romny	1	(0)
2000	Naftovyk Okhtyrka	10	(0)
2001	Gomel	2	(0)
2001–2002	Metalurh Mariupol	6	(0)
2001–2002	→ Metalurh-2 Mariupol	12	(0)
2003–2004	Ordabasy	40	(0)
2005	Kaisar	18	(0)
2006	Zirka Kirovohrad	14	(0)
2006–2011	Kremin Kremenchuk	96	(0)
Total		418	(9)
- * Club domestic league appearances and goals as of 31 December 2011

Volodymyr Viktorovych Dychko (Ukrainian: Володимир Вікторович Дичко; born 7 September 1972) is a Ukrainian former professional footballer who played as a defender.

== Career ==
Dychko was born in Komsomolske, Donetsk Oblast.

He transferred from Kaisar to Zirka during 2006 winter transfer window. Dychko decided to retire from playing in January 2009. He came out of retirement and signed with Kremin Kremenchuk during 2009 summer transfer window.

== Career statistics ==
As of 13 October 2009

Appearances and goals by club, season and competition
Club	Season	League		Ukrainian Cup		Total	
Club	Season	Apps	Goals	Apps	Goals	Apps	Goals
Olympik Kharkiv)	1989	0	0	0	0	0	0
Olympik Kharkiv)	1990	16	0	0	0	16	0
Olympik Kharkiv)	1991	30	0	0	0	30	0
Olympik Kharkiv)	1992	14	1	0	0	14	1
Olympik Kharkiv)	Total	60	1	0	0	60	1
SBTS Sumy	1993–94	2	0	2	0	2	0
Kremin Kremenchuk	1993–94	25	0	1	0	26	0
Kremin Kremenchuk	1994–95	31	0	4	0	35	0
Kremin Kremenchuk	Total	57	0	5	0	62	0
Vorskla Poltava	1995–96	39	1	2	0	41	1
Vorskla Poltava	1996–97	22	4	3	0	25	4
Vorskla Poltava	1997–98	21	3	3	0	24	3
Vorskla Poltava	1998–99	11	0	4	0	15	0
Vorskla Poltava	Total	93	8	12	0	105	8
Vorskla-2 Poltava	1997–98	2	0	0	0	2	0
Vorskla-2 Poltava	1998–99	5	0	0	0	5	0
Vorskla-2 Poltava	Total	7	0	0	0	7	0
Elektron Romny	1999–00	1	0	0	0	1	0
Naftovyk-Ukrnafta	1999–00	10	0	1	0	11	0
Gomel	2001	2	0	0	0	2	0
Metalurh Mariupol	2001–02	6	0	2	0	8	0
Metalurh-2 Mariupol	2001–02	12	0	0	0	12	0
Ordabasy	2003	25	0	1	0	26	0
Ordabasy	2004	15	0	1	0	16	0
Ordabasy	Total	40	0	2	0	42	0
Kaisar	2005	18	0	2	0	20	0
Zirka Kirovohrad	2005–06	14	0	0	0	14	0
Kremin Kremenchuk	2006–07	21	1	0	0	21	1
Kremin Kremenchuk	2007–08	17	0	1	0	18	0
Kremin Kremenchuk	2008–09	20	0	1	0	21	0
Kremin Kremenchuk	2009–10	10	0	1	0	11	0
Kremin Kremenchuk	2010–11	0	0	2	0	2	0
Kremin Kremenchuk	Total	68	1	5	0	73	1
Career total		391	10	31	0	422	10
