= Oleksiy Tymchenko =

Ukrainian football midfielder (born 1985)

Personal information
- Full name: Oleksiy Anatoliovych Tymchenko
- Date of birth: 9 June 1985 (age 41)
- Place of birth: village Pantaziivka, Kirovohrad Oblast, Ukraine
- Height: 1.78 m (5 ft 10 in)
- Position: Midfielder

Youth career
- 1998: CYSS Ordzhonikidze
- 1998–2000: Krystal-Ametist Olexandria
- 2000: Kryvbas Kryvyi Rih
- 2001–2002: Knyazha

Senior career*
Years	Team	Apps	(Gls)
2001–2004	Borysfen Boryspil	2	(0)
2001–2004	→ Borysfen-2 Boryspil	53	(4)
2004	→ Boreks-Borysfen Borodianka	11	(1)
2005	MFC Oleksandriya	25	(3)
2006	Nafkom Brovary	28	(7)
2007	CSKA Kyiv	11	(0)
2007–2010	Kremin Kremenchuk	73	(6)
2011	UkrAhroKom Holovkivka	9	(0)
2011	SKAD-Yalpuh Bolhrad	15	(3)
2012	Prykarpattia Ivano-Frankivsk	6	(0)
2012–2013	Dynamo Khmelnytskyi	22	(3)
2014–2015	FC Holovkivka		
2015	Inhulets Petrove		
2015–2016	FC Holovkivka		
- * Club domestic league appearances and goals

Oleksiy Anatoliovych Tymchenko (Ukrainian: Олексій Анатолійович Тимченко; born 9 June 1985) is a Ukrainian former football midfielder.

== Club history ==
Oleksiy Tymchenko began his football career in CYSS Ordzhonikidze in Ordzhonikidze. He signed with FC Kremin Kremenchuk during 2007 summer transfer window.

== Career statistics ==
As of 21 September 2009

Club	Season	League		Cup		Total	
Club	Season	Apps	Goals	Apps	Goals	Apps	Goals
Borysfen-2	2001–02	3	0	0	0	3	0
Borysfen-2	Total	3	0	0	0	3	0
Borysfen	2001–02	0	0	0	0	0	0
Borysfen	2002–03	1	0	0	0	1	0
Borysfen	Total	1	0	0	0	1	0
Borysfen-2	2001–03	29	1	0	0	29	1
Borysfen-2	2003–04	21	3	0	0	21	3
Borysfen-2	Total	50	4	0	0	50	4
Boreks-Borysphen	2003–04	11	1	0	0	11	1
Boreks-Borysphen	Total	11	1	0	0	11	1
Borysfen reserves	2004–05	12	1	0	0	12	1
Borysfen reserves	Total	12	1	0	0	12	1
Oleksandria	2004–05	6	2	0	0	6	2
Oleksandria	2005–06	12	0	0	0	12	0
Oleksandria	Total	18	2	0	0	18	2
Nafkom	2005–06	11	2	0	0	11	2
Nafkom	2006–07	17	6	1	0	18	6
Nafkom	Total	28	8	1	0	29	8
CSKA Kyiv	2006–07	11	0	0	0	11	0
CSKA Kyiv	Total	11	0	0	0	11	0
Kremin	2007–08	26	2	0	0	26	2
Kremin	2008–09	25	4	1	0	26	4
Kremin	2009–10	5	0	1	0	6	0
Kremin	Total	56	6	2	0	58	6
Career	Total	190	22	3	0	193	22
